= Park Bo-young filmography =

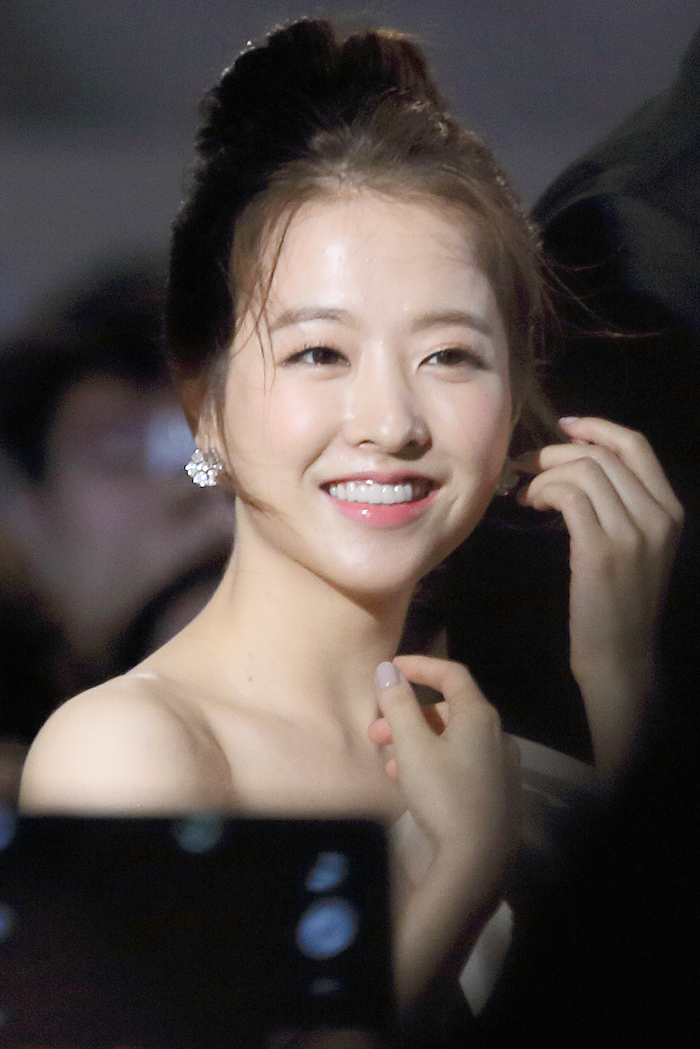
- Park in 2015
- Film: 15
- Television series: 13
- Web series: 3
- Television show: 11
- Radio show: 2
- Documentary: 2
- Hosting: 2
- Music videos: 10
- Narrating: 5
- Advertising: 49

Park Bo-young (Korean: 박보영, born February 12, 1990) is a South Korean actress.

== Film ==
Year	Title	Role	Notes	Ref.
2005	Equal	Kim Da-mi	Short film	
2008	Our School's E.T.	Han Song-yi		
2008	The ESP Couple	Hyun-jin		
2008	Scandal Makers	Hwang Jung-nam / Hwang Jae-in		
2009	If You Were Me 4	Kim Hee-soo	Segment: Relay	
2011	Rio	Jewel (voice)	Korean dub	
2012	Don't Click	Se-hee		
2012	A Werewolf Boy	Sun-yi / Eun-joo		
2013	Snow Queen	Gerda (voice)	Korean dub	
2014	Hot Young Bloods	Park Young-sook		
2015	The Silenced	Cha Ju-ran / Shizuko		
2015	Collective Invention	Ju-jin		
2015	You Call It Passion	Do Ra-hee		
2018	On Your Wedding Day	Hwan Seung-hee		
2023	Concrete Utopia	Myung-hwa		
TBA	Kiss For Tomorrow (너와 함께라면)	Oh-sung		

== Television series ==
Year	Title	Role	Notes	Ref.
2006	Secret Campus	Cha Ah-rang		
2007	Witch Yoo Hee	young Ma Yoo-hee	Cameo	
2007	Mackerel Run	Shim Chung-ah		
2007	The King and I	young Yoon So-hwa	Cameo	
2008	Jungle Fish	Lee Eun-soo		
2008	Strongest Chil Woo	Choi Woo-young	Cameo	
2008	Star's Lover	young Lee Ma-ri	Cameo	
2015	Oh My Ghost	Na Bong-sun		
2017	Strong Girl Bong-soon	Do Bong-soon		
2019	Abyss	Go Se-yeon / Lee Mi-do		
2021	Doom at Your Service	Tak Dong-kyung		
2023	Strong Girl Nam-soon	Do Bong-soon	Cameo (episode 3)	
2023	Daily Dose of Sunshine	Jung Da-eun		
2024	Light Shop	Kwon Young-ji		
2025	Melo Movie	Kim Moo-bi		
2025	Our Unwritten Seoul	Yoo Mi-ji / Yoo Mi-rae		
2026	Gold Land	Kim Heeju		

== Reality/variety shows ==
Year	Title	Notes	Ref.
2011	KOICA's Dream: Peru	Volunteer (special project)	
2012	KOICA's Dream: El Salvador	Volunteer (special project)	
2012	Entertainment Relay	Guerilla Date section	
2013	Section TV	Rising Star section	
2013	Law of the Jungle in New Zealand	Cast member	
2013	Get It Beauty: Self	Bright Peach Make-up (aired for one week)	
2013	KOICA's Dream: Indonesia	Volunteer (special project)	
2015	Section TV	Star-ting section	
2015	Entertainment Weekly	Guerilla Date section	
2016	We Kid	Mentor	
2018	Actor & Chatter	Featured actor	
2026	The Secret Friends Club	Part 3 Cast member	

== Radio program ==
Year	Title	Broadcaster	Notes	Ref.
2018	Cultwo Show	SBS Power FM	Guest DJ	(Note: Park appeared on the show as a guest DJ on April 18–19, June 5–6 and 18, 2018.)
2019	Park So-hyun's Love Game	SBS Power FM	Special DJ	(Note: Park appeared on the show as a special DJ on September 25–26, 2019.)

== Documentary ==
Year	Title	Notes	Ref.
2006	선생님과 함께하는 5월 이야기	Co-host	
2013	Violence-Free School: Now It's Your Turn to Speak		

== Hosting ==
Year	Title	Notes	Ref.
2012	Arirang Our Great Heritage	MC	
2016	KCON 2016 New York	Special host (with Im Si-wan)	
2024	Opening Ceremony of the 29th Busan International Film Festival	With Ahn Jae-hong	

== Narration ==
Year	Title	Notes	Ref.
2011	KOICA's Dream: Peru	Episode 2	
2012	Human Documentary Love		
2013	Violence-Free School: Now It's Your Turn to Speak	Documentary	
2013	Sunday Cinema		
2013	KOICA's Dream: Indonesia		

== Music video appearances ==
Year	Song title	Artist	Ref.
2007	"Couldn't Help It" (오죽했으면) (Note: The 30-minute music video in two parts for "Couldn't Help It" called Goodbye Sadness was released in June 2007 starring Jung Il-woo, Baek Sung-hyun, Ahn Gil-kang and Kim Hyun-sung, with a cameo appearance of Park Bo-young. Two shorter versions of the music video were later released.)	Goo Jung-hyun	YouTube
2007	"Still Pretty Today" (오늘도 이쁜걸)	Fly to the Sky	YouTube
2008	"가슴아 제발"	Yuri	YouTube
2008	"Between Love and Friendship" (사랑과 우정사이)	Park Hye-kyung	YouTube
2011	"Only I Didn't Know" (나만 몰랐던 이야기)	IU	YouTube
2011	"Fiction"	Beast	YouTube
2013 (Note: The music videos for "That's My Fault" and "It's Over" (Drama Ver.) were based on the May 18 Gwangju Democratization Movement that starred Park Bo-young, Ji Chang-wook, Ha Seok-jin and Son Na-eun.)	"That's My Fault" (슬픈 약속) (Drama ver.)	Speed feat. Kang Min-kyung	YouTube
2013	"It's Over" (Drama ver.)	Speed	YouTube
2013	"It's Over" (Dance ver.)	Speed feat. Park Bo-young	YouTube
2025	the moment i see you (너의 얼굴을 보면)	Park Bo-young	YouTube

== Advertising ==
Year	Company	Brand/business	Notes	Ref.
2006	Korea Hydro & Nuclear Power	—N/a	Public advertisement	
2006	Lotte Confectionery	Xylitol	Chewing gum	
2006	SK Chemicals	트라스트	Medicine	
2006	Lee Hyun Apparel	Blue Tail	Clothing	
2006	Ottogi	Ottogi Cooked Rice	Retort food	
2006	Ottogi	Jin Ramen Cup	Instant noodle	
2006	Woori Financial Group	Woori Bank		
2007	Coway	Looloo	Bidet	
2007	Hanshin Engineering & Construction Group	세븐밸리	Outlet	
2007	SK Telecom	Ting	Mobile communication	
2007	예신퍼슨스	Marui	Clothing	
2008	Johnson & Johnson	Clean & Clear	Cosmetics	
2009	Nongshim	Ansungtangmyun	Instant noodle	
2009	Ministry of Economy and Finance	Korea Lottery Commission	Public advertisement	
2009	Binggrae	Cledor	Ice cream	
2009	Nonghyup Moguchon	또래오래	Chicken	
2009	Samsung	Hahaha Campaign	Corporate PR	
2009	MPK Group	Mr. Pizza		
2009–10	Lotte Hi-Mart	—N/a		
2011	ESTsoft	Zum	Web portal	
2013	Nintendo of Korea	Animal Crossing: New Leaf	Console game	
2013	Starluxe	LeSportsac	Bag	
2013	Estée Lauder Companies	Clinique	Cosmetics	
2013	Korea Paprika Growers Association Group	Paprika	Vegetable	
2013–16	Nexon Korea Corporation	Sudden Attack	Online game	
2015	YD Online	The God of High School	Mobile game	
2015	LG Uplus	IoT@home	Internet service	
2015	Dongsuh Foods	Post Granola	Cereal	
2015–16	Samsung Fire & Marine Insurance	Anycar Direct	Car insurance	
2015–17	Muhak Co.	Good Day	Soju	
2015–18	Claire's Korea	Guerisson	Cosmetics	
2015–18	Claire's Korea	Cloud 9	Cosmetics	
2015–19	LG Unicharm	Sofy Bodyfit	Sanitary pad	
2016–17	나눔씨엔씨	Think Nature	Shampoo and body wash	
2016–17	Dongwon F&B	Dongwon Mall	Online food shopping website	
2016–21	Coca-Cola Korea	Toreta by Aquarius	Beverage	
2017	Lotte Hi-Mart	—N/a		
2017	Korea Paprika Growers Association Group	Paprika	Vegetable	
2017–21	Dong-A Pharmaceutical	Garglin	Mouthwash	
2018	Dong-A Pharmaceutical	Panpyrin	Medicine	
2018	GN Food	굽네치킨	Chicken	
2018	HiHo Game	삼국지대전M	Mobile game	
2021	Aurora World	Dr. Smile K	Face mask	
2021	Binggrae	Cledor	Ice cream	
2021	Ami Cosmetic	BRTC	Cosmetics	
2024-present	Dongsuh Companies Inc.	Maxim Mocha Gold	Coffee	
2024-present	Nonghyup Red Ginseng	Hansamin	Health food	
2025-present	Jeju Samdasoo	Samdasoo	Drinking water	
2025-present	Menokin Beauty	MENOKIN Quick Bubble Mask	Skin care	
2025-present	Google LLC	Google Play	Application	
2025-present	T-money Corporation	Tmoney	Smart card and app	
2025	Samsung C&T Corporation	Beanpole	Clothing, apparel, accessories	
2026	Chong Kun Dang Healthcare Corp.	LACTO-FIT	Health and wellness supplements	
