= List of awards and nominations received by Park Bo-young =

Park Bo-young awards and nominations
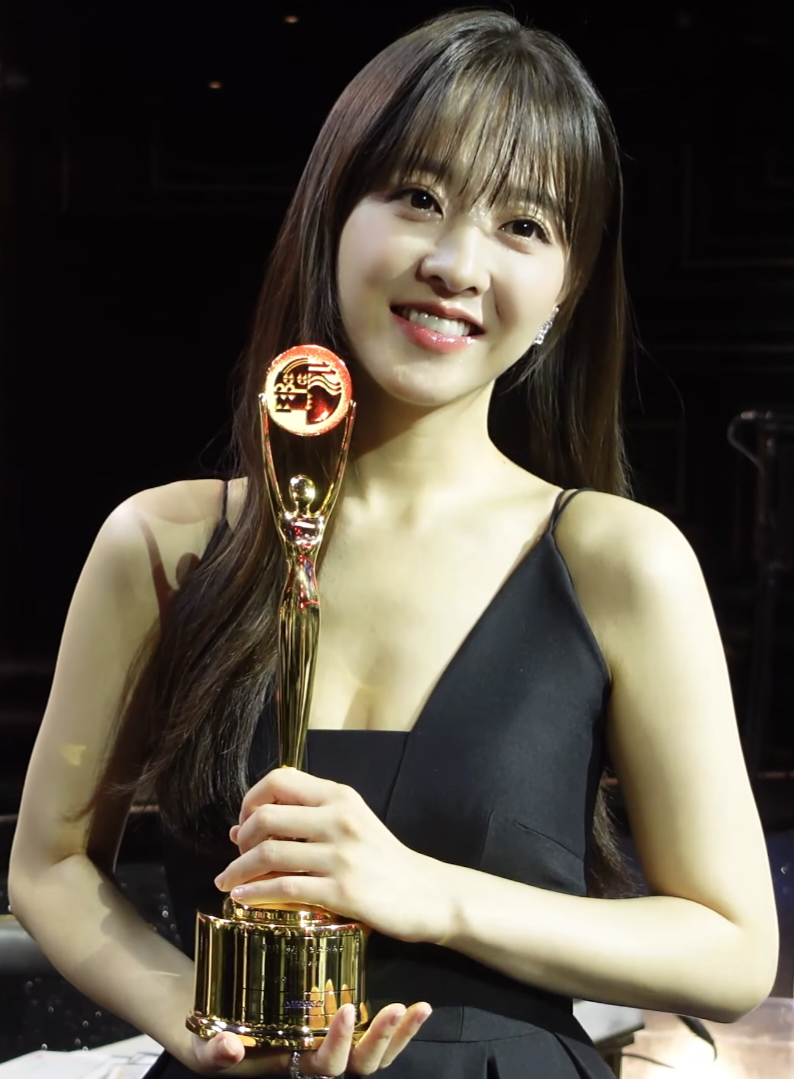
- Park at the 3rd Blue Dragon Series Awards in 2024
Awards and nominations
| Award | Wins | Nominations |
| Andre Kim Best Star Awards | 1 | 1 |
| APAN Star Awards | 1 | 1 |
| Asia Artist Awards | 0 | 1 |
| Asia Contents Awards & Global OTT Awards | 0 | 1 |
| Baeksang Arts Awards | 3 | 4 |
| Bechdel Day | 1 | 1 |
| Blue Dragon Film Awards | 3 | 6 |
| Blue Dragon Series Awards | 1 | 1 |
| Brand Customer Loyalty Awards | 1 | 1 |
| Brand of the Year Awards | 1 | 1 |
| Buil Film Awards | 1 | 2 |
| Chunsa Film Art Awards | 0 | 1 |
| Cine21 Film Awards | 3 | 3 |
| CJ ENM Visionary | 1 | 1 |
| ContentAsia Awards | 1 | 1 |
| Daejeon DFX OTT Awards | 1 | 1 |
| DAP Awards | 1 | 1 |
| Director's Cut Awards | 1 | 2 |
| DramaFever Awards | 1 | 1 |
| Fundex Awards | 0 | 2 |
| Global OTT Awards | 0 | 1 |
| Golden Cinematography Awards | 2 | 2 |
| Grand Bell Awards | 1 | 2 |
| InStyle Star Icon | 1 | 1 |
| KCA Consumer Day Awards | 1 | 1 |
| Korea Advertisers Association Awards | 1 | 1 |
| Korea Drama Awards | 1 | 2 |
| Korea First Brand Awards | 1 | 1 |
| Korea Jewelry Awards | 1 | 1 |
| Korea Junior Star Awards | 1 | 1 |
| Korea World Youth Film Festival | 1 | 1 |
| Korean Association of Film Critics Awards | 1 | 1 |
| Korean Culture and Entertainment Awards | 2 | 2 |
| London East Asia Film Festival | 1 | 1 |
| Marie Claire Asia Star Awards | 2 | 2 |
| Max Movie Awards | 1 | 1 |
| Mnet 20's Choice Awards | 1 | 1 |
| Pierson Movie Festival | 1 | 1 |
| SBS Drama Awards | 1 | 1 |
| Seoul International Drama Awards | 1 | 2 |
| Style Icon Asia | 1 | 1 |
| The Seoul Awards | 1 | 2 |
| tvN10 Awards | 1 | 3 |
| University Film Festival of Korea | 1 | 1 |
| V Live Awards | 1 | 1 |

Totals (Note: Certain award groups do not simply award one winner. They acknowledge several different recipients, have runners-up, and have third place. Since this is a specific recognition and is different from losing an award, runner-up mentions are considered wins in this award tally. For simplification and to avoid errors, each award in this list has been presumed to have had a prior nomination.)
- Wins: 49
- Nominations: 67

This is a list of awards and nominations received by South Korean actress Park Bo-young. Since her debut in 2006, she has been the recipient of numerous awards, including three Baeksang Arts Awards include best new actress for film and best actress for television, three Blue Dragon Film Awards, a Grand Bell Award, and a Buil Film Award.

== Awards and nominations ==
Name of the award ceremony, year presented, category, nominee of the award, and the result of the nomination
| Award ceremony | Year | Category | Nominee / Work | Result | Ref. |
|---|---|---|---|---|---|
| Andre Kim Best Star Awards | 2009 | Female Star Award | Park Bo-young | Won | |
| APAN Star Awards | 2015 | Excellence Award, Actress in a Miniseries | Oh My Ghost | Won | |
| APAN Star Awards | 2025 | Top Excellence Award, Actress in a Mid-length Series | Our Unwritten Seoul | Nominated | |
| Asia Artist Awards | 2026 | Popularity Award – Actress | Park Bo-young | Pending | |
| Asia Contents Awards & Global OTT Awards | 2024 | Best Lead Actress | Daily Dose of Sunshine | Nominated | |
| Baeksang Arts Awards | 2009 | Best New Actress – Film | Scandal Makers | Won | |
| Baeksang Arts Awards | 2009 | Most Popular Actress (Film) | Scandal Makers | Won | |
| Baeksang Arts Awards | 2017 | Best Actress – Television | Strong Girl Bong-soon | Nominated | |
| Baeksang Arts Awards | 2026 | Best Actress – Television | Our Unwritten Seoul | Won | |
| Bechdel Day | 2025 | Bechdelian of the Year | Park Bo-young | Won | |
| Blue Dragon Film Awards | 2009 | Best New Actress | Scandal Makers | Won | |
| Blue Dragon Film Awards | 2015 | Popular Star Award | The Silenced | Won | |
| Blue Dragon Film Awards | 2018 | Best Actress | On Your Wedding Day | Nominated | |
| Blue Dragon Film Awards | 2023 | Best Actress | Concrete Utopia | Nominated | |
| Blue Dragon Film Awards | 2023 | Popular Star Award | Concrete Utopia | Won | |
| Blue Dragon Series Awards | 2024 | Best Actress | Daily Dose of Sunshine | Won | |
| Blue Dragon Series Awards | 2026 | Best Actress | Gold Land | Nominated | |
| Brand Customer Loyalty Awards | 2024 | Best Actress (OTT) | Daily Dose of Sunshine | Won | |
| Brand of the Year Awards | 2025 | Best Actress | Park Bo-young | Won | |
| Buil Film Awards | 2009 | Best New Actress | Scandal Makers | Nominated | |
| Buil Film Awards | 2023 | Star of the Year Award (Female) | Concrete Utopia | Won | |
| Chunsa Film Art Awards | 2009 | Best New Actress | Scandal Makers | Nominated | |
| Cine21 Film Awards | 2008 | Best New Actress | Scandal Makers | Won | |
| Cine21 Film Awards | 2023 | Series Category – Actress of the Year | Daily Dose of Sunshine | Won | |
| Cine21 Film Awards | 2025 | Series Category – Actress of the Year | Our Unwritten Seoul | Won | |
| CJ ENM Visionary | 2026 | 2026 Visionary | Our Unwritten Seoul (Mi-ji / Mi-rae) | Won | |
| ContentAsia Awards | 2026 | Best Female Lead in a TV Programme/Series Made in Asia | Our Unwritten Seoul | Gold | |
| Daejeon Special FX Film Festival (DFX OTT Awards) | 2025 | Grand Prize (Daesang) (Note: A Daesang (Korean: 대상), which translates to "Grand Prize", is the highest honor given out at South Korean award ceremonies.) | Our Unwritten Seoul | Won | |
| Dong-A.com's Pick (Note: Award winners are selected by Dong-a Ilbo entertainment reporters.) | 2025 | Special Award | Our Unwritten Seoul | Won | |
| Director's Cut Awards | 2009 | Best New Actress | Scandal Makers | Won | |
| Director's Cut Awards | 2024 | Best Actress | Daily Dose of Sunshine | Nominated | |
| DramaFever Awards | 2016 | Best Actress | Oh My Ghost | Won | |
| Fundex Awards | 2025 | Best Actress (TV Drama) | Our Unwritten Seoul | Nominated | |
| Fundex Awards | 2025 | Popular Star Prize (Female) | Park Bo-young | Nominated | |
| Global OTT Awards | 2025 | Best Actress | Our Unwritten Seoul | Nominated | |
| Global OTT Awards | 2026 | Best Actress | Gold Land | Nominated | |
| Golden Cinematography Awards | 2009 | Best New Actress | Scandal Makers | Won | |
| Golden Cinematography Awards | 2025 | Best Actress (Special Acting Award – OTT Drama Category) | Melo Movie | Won | |
| Grand Bell Awards | 2009 | Best New Actress | Scandal Makers | Nominated | |
| Grand Bell Awards | 2009 | Popularity Award | Scandal Makers | Won | |
| InStyle Star Icon | 2016 | Best Actress | Park Bo-young | Won | |
| KCA Consumer Day Awards | 2018 | Best Actress | On Your Wedding Day | Won | |
| Korea Advertisers Association Awards | 2017 | Best Model Award | Park Bo-young | Won | |
| Korea Drama Awards | 2025 | Popular Couple Award | Park Bo-young and Park Jin-young (Our Unwritten Seoul) | Nominated | |
| Korea Drama Awards | 2025 | Top Excellence Award, Actress | Our Unwritten Seoul | Won | |
| Korea First Brand Awards | 2024 | Best Actress (Movie) | Concrete Utopia | Won | |
| Korea Jewelry Awards | 2013 | Best Jewelry Lady | Park Bo-young | Won | |
| Korea Junior Star Awards | 2009 | Grand Prize (Daesang) -Film category | Scandal Makers | Won | |
| Korea World Youth Film Festival | 2015 | Most Favorite Actress | The Silenced | Won | |
| Korean Association of Film Critics Awards | 2009 | Best New Actress | Scandal Makers | Won | |
| Korean Culture and Entertainment Awards | 2009 | Best New Actress | Scandal Makers | Won | |
| Korean Culture and Entertainment Awards | 2014 | Excellence Award, Actress in a Film | Hot Young Bloods | Won | |
| London East Asia Film Festival | 2023 | Best Actress | Concrete Utopia | Won | |
| Busan International Film Festival with Marie Claire Asia Star Awards | 2024 | Asia Wide Award | Park Bo-young | Won | |
| Busan International Film Festival with Marie Claire Asia Star Awards | 2025 | Marie Claire Award | Park Bo-young | Won | |
| Mnet 20's Choice Awards | 2013 | 20's Movie Star - Female | A Werewolf Boy | Won | |
| Pierson Movie Festival | 2012 | Best Actress | A Werewolf Boy | Won | |
| 5th Nikon & KOPA Awards | 2016 | Photogenic Award | Park Bo-young | Won | |
| SBS Drama Awards | 2007 | Best Young Actress | The King and I | Won | |
| Seoul International Drama Awards | 2018 | Best Actress | Strong Girl Bong-soon | Nominated | |
| Seoul International Drama Awards | 2018 | Outstanding Korean Actress | Strong Girl Bong-soon | Won | |
| Style Icon Asia | 2016 | Style Icon | Park Bo-young | Won | |
| The Seoul Awards | 2017 | Best Actress (Drama) | Strong Girl Bong-soon | Won | |
| The Seoul Awards | 2018 | Best Actress (Film) | On Your Wedding Day | Nominated | |
| tvN10 Awards | 2016 | Best Chemistry | Park Bo-young and Kim Seul-gi (Oh My Ghost) | Won | |
| tvN10 Awards | 2016 | Best Kiss Award | Park Bo-young and Jo Jung-suk (Oh My Ghost) | Nominated | |
| tvN10 Awards | 2016 | Romantic Comedy Queen | Oh My Ghost | Nominated | |
| University Film Festival of Korea | 2009 | Best New Actress | Scandal Makers | Won | |
| V Live Awards | 2017 | Special V Live – V Live Special Thanks | Park Bo-young | Won | |

== State and cultural honors ==
Name of country, name of ceremony, year given, and name of honor or award
| Country | Ceremony | Year | Honor / Award | Ref. |
|---|---|---|---|---|
| South Korea | Korean Popular Culture and Arts Awards | 2017 | Minister of Culture, Sports and Tourism Commendation | |
| South Korea | Korean Popular Culture and Arts Awards | 2025 | Prime Minister's Commendation | |
| South Korea | Savings Day (Note: Organized by the Financial Services Commission, honors are given at a ceremony on Finance Day (formerly known as Savings Day until 2015), which is designated on the last Tuesday of October every year.) | 2012 | Chairman of Finance's Commendation | |
| South Korea | Taxpayer's Day (Note: Organized by the National Tax Service, honors are given at a ceremony on Taxpayer's Day, which is awarded annually every March 3rd.) | 2025 | National Tax Service Commissioner Award | |

== Listicles ==
Name of publisher, year listed, name of listicle, and placement
| Publisher | Year | Listicle | Placement | Ref. |
|---|---|---|---|---|
| Forbes | 2010 | Korea Power Celebrity 40 | 30th | |
| Forbes | 2026 | Korea Power Celebrity 40 | 36th | |
| Gallup Korea | 2012 | Film Actor of the Year | 8th | |
| Gallup Korea | 2023 | Film Actor of the Year | 15th | |
| Gallup Korea | 2023 | Television Actor of the Year | 17th (Note: Tied with Kim So-yeon and Kim Soo-mi (above 1.4%)) | |
| Cineplay | 2025 | Best Actresses | Top 4 | |
| Korean Film Council | 2021 | Korean Actors 200 (Note: Introduces 200 actors that best represent the present and future of Korean cinema to the people in the film industry all over the world.) | Included | |
