= Kim Sung-bum (actor) =

South Korean actor (born 1978)

- 김성범
- Born: July 29, 1978 (age 48); South Korea
- Other name: Kim Seong-beom
- Education: Department of Theatre; Seoul Institute of the Arts
- Occupations: Actor; traditional dancer
- Years active: 2007–present
- Agent: Medialab Seesaw
- Relatives: Jung Sung-hwa (brother in-law)

Korean name
- Hangul: 김성범
- RR: Gim Seongbeom
- MR: Kim Sŏngbŏm

Kim Sung-bum (Korean: 김성범; born July 29, 1978) is a South Korean actor, comedian, and traditional dancer. In 2005, Kim began his career as MBC comedian. Two years later Kim made his television debut with in MBC drama Chosun Cop Season 1 (2007) or also known as Byul Soon Geom. He has since starred in numerous television dramas, with the most recent one were Sell Your Haunted House (2021), Hometown Cha-Cha-Cha (2021) and Extraordinary Attorney Woo (2022).

== Career ==
=== Acting career ===
Kim is an alumnus of the Seoul Institute of the Arts, where he studied in the Department of Theatre. He began his entertainment career as a comedian for MBC in 2005. In 2007, he made his television debut with minor role in MBC drama Chosun Cop Season 1 (2007). In 2008, while still active in comedy, he expanded into various performance fields, appearing in the stage play The Crucible (2008), stage musical Pippin (2008) and movie Story of Wine (2008).

Since Kim met Park Bo-young in movie Hot Young Bloods (2014), he starred in several of her projects, such as three tvN dramas Oh My Ghost (2015), Strong Girl Bong-soon (2017) and Abyss (2019), also in her film On Your Wedding Day (2018). Before Park Bo-young moved to her current agency, She and Kim were together in same Actor Management Agency Fidespartium.

In 2015, Kim got his first television supporting role in director Yoo Je-won's drama Oh My Ghost as a police officer Han Jin-goo. He worked again with director Yoo Je-won in drama Abyss (2019) and Hometown Cha-Cha-Cha (2021).

=== Dancing career ===
In addition to his acting career, Kim has been a practitioner of Goseong ogwangdae for over a decade. He is a master-certified practitioner (isusa) within the Goseong Ogwangdae Preservation Society, led by Lee Yoon-seok.

Kim has frequently represented the tradition internationally. In September 2015, he participated in the Korean Master Singers Workshop in Northern California, an event supported by the Korean Cultural Center and the Goseong Ogwangdae Conservation Association. Alongside dancer Yoon Hyun-ho, Kim conducted a series of masterclasses and demonstrations across the region, including sessions at the Silicon Valley Korean Hall and local educational institutions. These workshops focused on the history and technique of the Goseong mask dance, further promoting the Intangible Cultural Heritage to overseas audiences.

In 2018, Kim performed in the National Theater Company's project Yeongeuk-dongne Yeonhui Madang, an initiative aimed at modernizing traditional Korean performance art. The festival was structured into three thematic "courtyards" located at the National Theater Company's Seogye-dong grounds. Kim appeared in the second courtyard in a showcase titled Finding the Yangban, a modern re-interpretation of the Goseong Ogwangdae mask dance. Selected through a competitive audition process, Kim and the ensemble focused on integrating the traditional elements of mask dance into a contemporary theatrical framework.

Since 2019, Kim has participated in the "BBRUN" Project, an experimental theatrical series that integrates motion capture and virtual reality (VR) technology. Regarded as one of South Korea's first immersive "metaverse" performances, the production allows for real-time interaction between live performers and digital environments. The inaugural performances were held from November 20 to 22, 2020, at the Asia Culture Center (ACC) ACT Studio in Gwangju. In this project, Kim's background in traditional movement was utilized to inform the digital choreography within a virtual space.

== Filmography ==
=== Film ===
Film performances
Year	Title	Role	Ref.
2008	Story of Wine	Real Estate Agent	
2008	Sleeping Beauty	Young-hoon's friend	
2008	The Guard Post	Choi Il-byeong	
2010	Enemy at the Dead End	Doctor 1	
2011	The Showdown	Dusu Son 1	
2011	My Way	Joseon Soldier	
2013	Jit (Act)	Chief Kim	
2013	Rough Play	Star Phil's Chief	
2014	Hot Young Bloods	Chang-su	
2015	The Phone	Coltegi's Boss	
2015	Love at the End of the World	Song Do-young	
2017	A Stray Goat	Detective 2	
2018	On Your Wedding Day	Store Clerk	

=== Television ===
==== Television drama ====
Television acting performances
Year	Title	Role	Ref.
2007	Chosun Police 1	Minor role	
2008	Painter of the Wind	Minor role	
2015	Oh My Ghost	Han Jin-goo	
2015	Come Back Mister	Minor role	
2016	Mrs. Cop 2	Minor role	
2016	Guardian: The Lonely and Great God	Minor Role; Driver who hits the Angel of Death with his car (and thinks it is a hog)	
2017	Strong Girl Bong-soon	Ahn Dong-ha	
2017	Fight for My Way	Lee Byung-ju	
2019	Abyss	Detective Choi	
2020	Queen: Love and War	Ki-chil	
2021	Sell Your Haunted House	Kang Han-seok	
2021	Hometown Cha-Cha-Cha	Bang Yong-hoon	
2022	Extraordinary Attorney Woo	Jo Hyeon-woo	

==== Television comedy show ====
Television comedy performances
Year	Title	Role	Ref.
2008	ITV Funny Children's Hope Journey	Comedian	
2006–2008	MBC It's a gag	Comedian	
2005	MBC Comedy Show Blessings come when you smile	Comedian	

== Performance ==
Dance performances
Year	Title		Role	Theater	Date	Ref.
Year	English	Korean	Role	Theater	Date	Ref.
2015	Korean Master Singers Workshop in Northern California		Dancer and Workshop Teacher	The Silicon Valley Korean School	September 26	
2018	Rediscovery of the original form of our theater: Goseong Ogwangdae	우리연극 원형의 재발견: 고성오광대	Dancer	National Theater Company Seogye-dong Madang	September 30	
2022	BBRUN Project		Dancer	the Cultural Creation Center ACT Studio	November 20–22	
