= Kim Sung-bum =

Kim Sung-bum may refer to:

- Kim Sung-bum (judoka)
- Kim Sung-bum (actor)
