= Jang Mi-kwan =

South Korean actor and model

- Born: July 21, 1989 (age 37); Yeongyang County, North Gyeongsang Province, South Korea
- Other names: Jang Mi-gwan; Jang Mi-guan
- Education: Daekyeung University
- Occupations: Actor; model
- Years active: 2009–present

Korean name
- Hangul: 장미관
- RR: Jang Migwan
- MR: Chang Migwan

Jang Mi-kwan (born July 21, 1989) is a South Korean actor and model. He is best known for his role in the television series Strong Girl Bong-soon (2017).

== Filmography ==
=== Television series ===
Year	Title	Role	Ref.
2017	Strong Girl Bong-soon	Kim Jang-hyun	
2017	Manhole	Park Jae-hyun	
2020	Fatal Promise	Nam Jung-wook	
2020	My Dangerous Wife	Jae-jung	

=== Web series ===
Year	Title	Role	Ref.
2023	Black Knight	5–2	

== Awards and nominations ==
Year	Award	Category	Nominated work	Result
2018	13th Soompi Awards	Breakout Actor	Strong Girl Bong-soon	Nominated
