= Park Bo-young =

South Korean actress (born 1990)

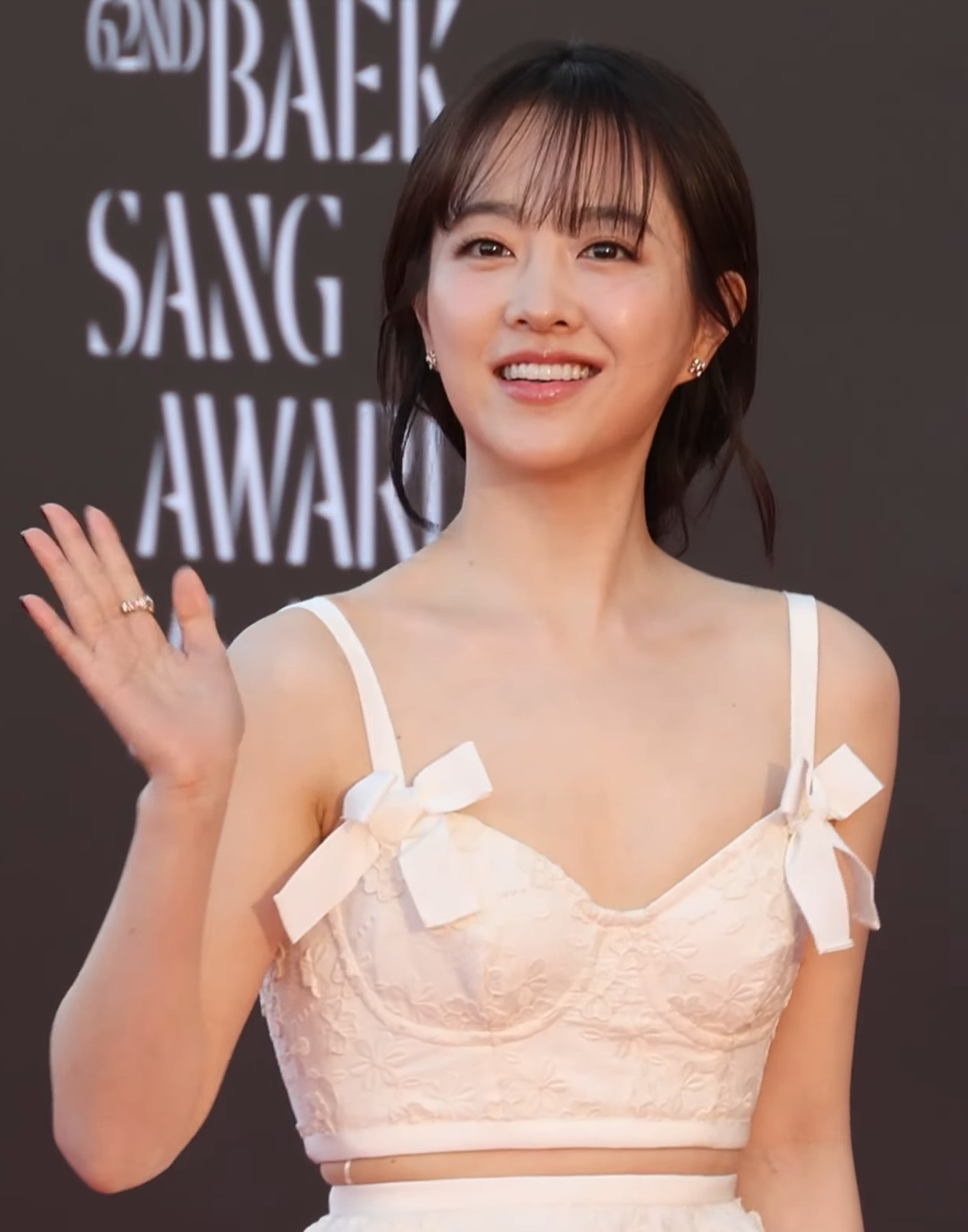
- Park in May 2026
- Born: February 12, 1990 (age 36); Jeungpyeong County, North Chungcheong Province, South Korea
- Education: Dankook University (Theatre and Film)
- Occupation: Actress
- Years active: 2006–present
- Agent: BH Entertainment
- Works: Full list
- Awards: Full list

Korean name
- Hangul: 박보영
- RR: Bak Boyeong
- MR: Pak Poyŏng
- Website: bhent.co.kr

Signature
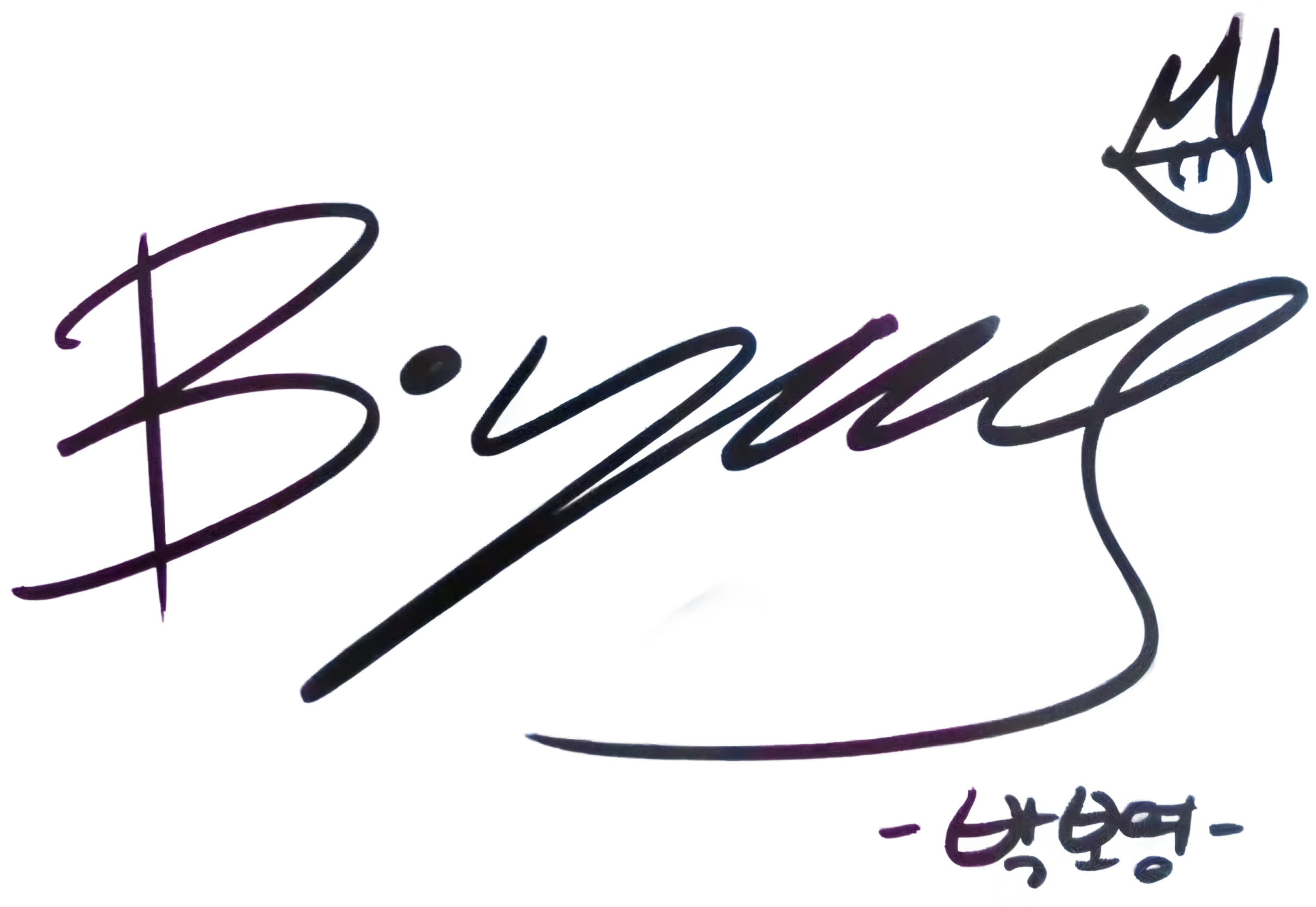

Park Bo-young (Korean: 박보영; born February 12, 1990) is a South Korean actress. She is best known for her leading roles in the films Scandal Makers (2008), which garnered her multiple best new actress awards, A Werewolf Boy (2012) and On Your Wedding Day (2018), as well as the television series Oh My Ghost (2015), Strong Girl Bong-soon (2017), Daily Dose of Sunshine (2023), and Our Unwritten Seoul (2025).

== Early life and education ==
Park was born in Jeungpyeong County, North Chungcheong Province, South Korea. She is the second of three daughters. Her father served in the Special Forces Brigade for 34 years. She graduated from Jeungpyeong Elementary School, Jeungpyeong Girls' Middle School, Daeseong Girls' Commercial High School and Dankook University's Department of Performing arts with a major in theater and film.

== Career ==
=== Beginnings ===
Before her official acting debut in 2006, while in middle school, Park appeared in the short film Equal in 2005. The clip won the Challenging Reality Award (현실도전상) at the seventh Seoul International Youth Film Festival (SIYFF 2005). She first appeared on television with a public commercial for Korea Hydro & Nuclear Power while in high school.

=== 2006–2010: Debut, breakthrough and hiatus ===
Park made her official acting debut in the 2006 high school television series Secret Campus alongside fellow newcomer Lee Min-ho. Among the notable projects during the early stage in her career are the historical epic The King and I and Peabody Award-winning teen drama Jungle Fish with Kim Soo-hyun, based on a true story that depicts the pressures placed on students to achieve and gain admission to prestigious colleges and universities.

Park rose to fame after starring opposite Cha Tae-hyun in comedy Scandal Makers, which drew 8.3 million viewers to become the number one top grosser of 2008 and one of Korean cinema's biggest hits. Described by Variety as "excellent" in her role as a spunky teenage mom, Park's much-praised performance swept Best New Actress awards in 2009. She was also dubbed as "Nation's Little Sister" because of its success. She then starred in a short film directed by Lee Hyun-seung, human rights-themed omnibus If You Were Me 4 in 2009.

However, in 2010 she became involved in a series of legal disputes with her then-management agency and a film production company, causing the actress to be tied up in lawsuits and unable to work for the next few years.

=== 2011–2014: Return to big screen and mainstream success ===
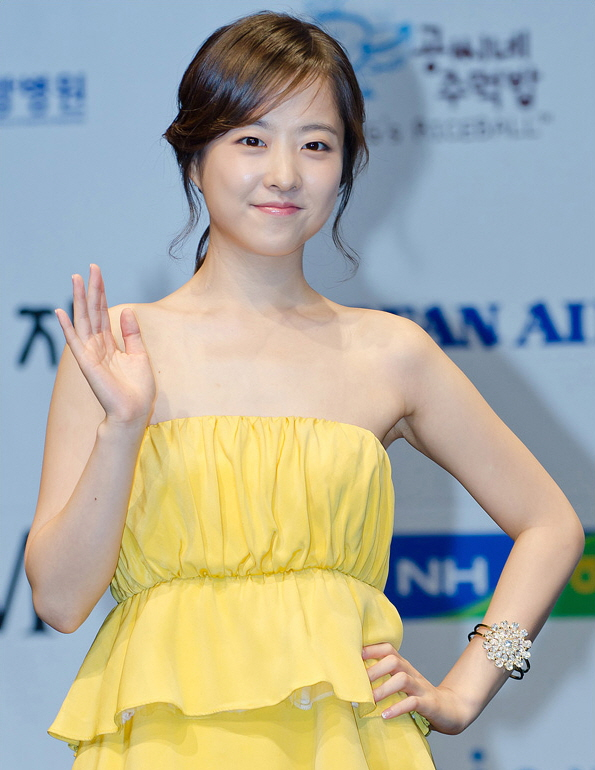
Park at the PiFan Film Festival in 2011

After she was designated the promotional ambassador (called "PiFan Lady") for the 2011 Puchon International Fantastic Film Festival, Park finally ended her four-year absence from the limelight by headlining the 2012 horror thriller Don't Click. Later that year, she starred alongside Song Joong-ki in fantasy romance film A Werewolf Boy, which surpassed 7 million admissions to become one of the most successful Korean melodramas of all time. The song her character sings in the film, "My Prince", was released as a digital single and included in the movie soundtrack.

In 2013, Park joined the cast of Law of the Jungle, a reality-documentary program featuring comedian Kim Byung-man and several celebrities as they explore and survive the New Zealand wilderness.

In a departure from her previous sweet, innocent characters, Park played the tough, potty-mouthed leader of her high school gang in Hot Young Bloods (2014), a teen romantic comedy set in the 1980s. Park, who was born in North Chungcheong Province, said she had fun swearing in the southern dialect, though she found it difficult to master, being a mixture of Jeolla and Chungcheong dialects.

=== 2015–2019: Television comeback and continued success ===
In 2015, she headlined the mystery thriller The Silenced, set in a girls' boarding school during the Japanese occupation. This was followed by dual roles in romantic comedy Oh My Ghost, Park's first television series in seven years. Her salary of ₩30 million (US$27,000) per episode made her the highest-paid actress to appear on cable channel tvN. The series was a commercial and critical hit, and garnered the Best Actress award for Park at the 4th APAN Star Awards. She was also dubbed as the "romantic comedy queen" by the Korean press.

Park next played the selfish love interest of a mutant in the black comedy Collective Invention, and an entertainment news cub reporter in the workplace comedy You Call It Passion (2015). In June 2016, Park was cast as the title role in JTBC's series Strong Girl Bong-soon, which premiered in February 2017, where she played a character with superhuman strength. The series became one of the highest rated Korean dramas in cable television history. Due to its popularity, it earned her Korea Reputation Center's highest brand value among Korean TV actors and the highest consumer participation rate in February and March 2017.

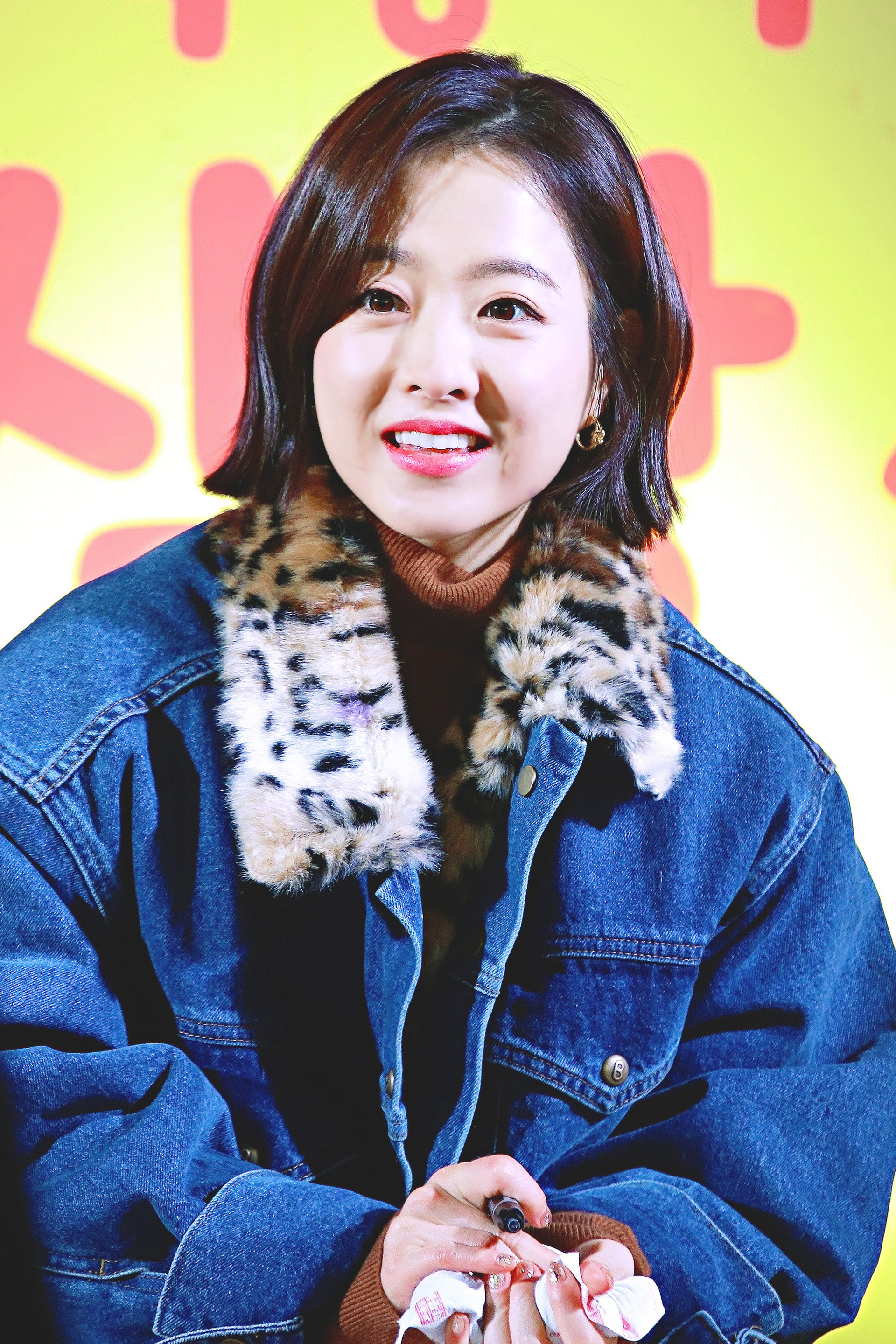
Park at a fansigning event in 2018

In September 2017, Park began filming the romance film On Your Wedding Day which premiered in August 2018. She was reunited with Kim Young-kwang, whom she previously acted with in the 2014 film Hot Young Bloods. The film was a box office hit and received positive reviews. Park then starred in tvN's series Abyss in May 2019, where she played a beautiful prosecutor who transforms into a plain-looking girl after being revived by a mysterious orb. She parted ways with her ten-year agency Fides Spatium in December 2019. Two months later, she signed an exclusive contract with BH Entertainment.

=== 2020–present: Established actress ===
In December 2020, Park was cast in fantasy romance series Doom at Your Service alongside Seo In-guk, which premiered on May 10, 2021, on tvN. In April 2021, she also began filming Um Tae-hwa's disaster thriller film Concrete Utopia, alongside Lee Byung-hun and Park Seo-joon. It was released theatrically on August 9, 2023. In 2023, Park made a cameo appearance in Strong Girl Nam-soon as Do Bong-soon. She also starred in Netflix original series Daily Dose of Sunshine, which was released on November 3, 2023. In 2024, she was cast as the character Kwon Young-ji for the Disney+ web series Light Shop. She was also invited to the 29th Busan International Film Festival as the host of the opening ceremony.

In the beginning of 2025, Park starred in the Netflix series Melo Movie opposite Choi Woo Shik. In June 2025, the series Our Unwritten Seoul aired on tvN and Netflix, where Park took on the complex challenge of playing dual roles as identical twins. This series was successful domestically with record ratings and received global acclaim. It is "one of the calmest and deepest Korean dramas of 2025," wrote Time magazine about the series.

== Other activities ==
=== Philanthropy ===
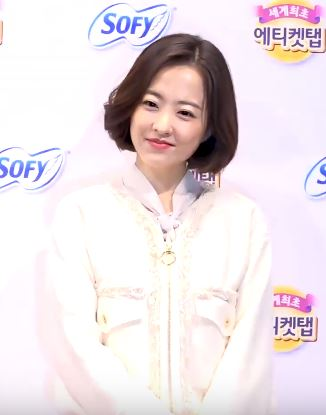
Park at autograph signing event for Sofy Bodyfit's Share Pad Campaign in April 2019

Park Bo-young has participated in several charitable causes; such as talent donations for ChildFund Korea—Green Umbrella Children's Foundation's "Love, One More" campaign in 2014 and Sandol Green Umbrella Handwriting project in 2017. She also sponsored two children through the Green Umbrella Children's Foundation from 2013.

Park participated in the Share Pad Campaign by LG Unicharm's sanitary pad brand Sofy Bodyfit and provided pads to girls from low-income single parents from 2016 until 2019. In May 2017 and April 2019, she held autograph signing events to donate a total of 1.1 million pieces of sanitary pads to Korean Women's Welfare Association as part of the campaign.

On April 15, 2017, Park held an autograph session in Seoul to support an orphanage in Cambodia. It was hosted by Think Nature, a cosmetic brand that she endorsed at that time. All proceeds from the event were donated to support children in Cambodia.

In February 2020, she donated 50 million won to help the fight against COVID-19 during the mass outbreak. In August, she donated 20 million won to support the aid for flood victims through the Hope Bridge Disaster Relief Association. She was also one of the celebrities who participated in 2020 WeAja Flea Market charity auction.

In February 2021, she donated 30 million won to non-profit organization Good Neighbors in celebration of her birthday to provide young girls from low-income families with sanitary items. In July, she donated 100,000 face masks to the North Gyeongsang Province Fire Department through the Hope Bridge Disaster Relief Association.

In February 2022, international development cooperation NGO G-Foundation announced that Park donated 50 million won on her birthday to fund kits with sanitary products for young girls from low-income households. In March, she donated 50 million won to Hope Bridge Disaster Relief Association to help residents affected by the wildfires in Uljin, North Gyeongsang Province, Samcheok, Gangneung, Donghae, and Yeongwol. Because of her donations, Park became a member of Hope Bridge Disaster Relief Association's major donor club called "Hope Bridge Honors Club" in April 2022.

In February 2023, Park donated 30 million won through the Hope Bridge Korea Disaster Relief Association to provide aid for the 2023 Turkey–Syria earthquake. In the same year, she made a donation of 100 million won to Seoul Children’s Hospital. It is also known that since 2014, the company has maintained a steady partnership with Seoul Children’s Hospital. Over the past ten years, it has donated more than 250 million won, including support for medical equipment, air conditioners, air purifiers, and medical assistance for patients. In particular, beyond financial contributions, the company has volunteered directly at the hospital, dedicating around 120 hours of service. Their heartfelt efforts have been recognized for providing practical help such as patient care, meal assistance, and support for guardians and hospital staff.

On January 4, 2024, to celebrate the New Year, she donated 20 million won to Seoul Children’s Hospital — marking her 11th year of donating to the hospital. On May 3 of the same year, Park Bo-young donated 50 million won in celebration of Children’s Day, continuing her support for underprivileged children and adolescents in Korea through the international development cooperation NGO, G Foundation. The donation will be used to fund a program providing underwear for underprivileged female youth and to support cultural experience activities for children in childcare facilities. In December 2024, she donated 10 million won to support 50 underprivileged residents in her hometown, Jeungpyeong County, North Chungcheong Province.

On March 26, 2025, the Hope Bridge Korea Disaster Relief Association (Chairman Song Pil-ho) announced that actress Park Bo-young donated 50 million won to support firefighters. The donation was made in response to the forest fire that began in Sancheong County, South Gyeongsang Province. It will be used to promote awareness and improve the working conditions of firefighters who dedicate themselves to disaster sites such as wildfires and other fire emergencies. In May 2025, she donated 20 million won to Seoul Children's Hospital in Celebration of Children's Day. The donation, delivered through ChildFund Korea (Green Umbrella), will be used to improve the treatment environment for patients at the hospital.

=== Ambassadorship ===
Year	Organization/event	Notes	Ref.
2009	Ministry of Strategy and Finance, Lottery Commission	Promotional ambassador	
2009	Good Downloader	Star supporter	
2010	Seoul G20 Summit	Star supporter	
2011	15th Puchon International Fantastic Film Festival (PiFan)	Promotional ambassador	
2012	Internet Newspaper "Campus Today"	Honorary reporter	
2013	EcoMobility World Festival: Suwon	International ambassador	
2013	Korea International Cooperation Agency (KOICA)	Ambassador	
2014	CJ CGV Toto's Workshop in Vietnam	Honorary ambassador	
2014	Korea National Police Hospital	Honorary ambassador	
2015	CJ CGV Toto's Workshop in Indonesia	Honorary ambassador	
2015	Korea Customs Service's Integrated Travel Guide "Tour Pass"	Ambassador	
2020	16th Jecheon International Music & Film Festival	Honorary ambassador	
2022	Jeungpyeong County	Public Relations ambassador	

== Personal life ==
Park's ankle ligaments were torn during a workout before shooting began for TV series Strong Girl Bong-soon (2017). In April 2017, the hospital advised her to wear a cast but she had to use ankle tape and started out with physical therapy instead, due to the ongoing filming. Two months after wrapping up the series, she underwent a twenty-minute minor surgery. On September 6, her agency stated that the actress was in the final stages of rehabilitation and would start filming On Your Wedding Day (2018) later that month. In November 2019, Park announced a temporary hiatus to recover from arm injury. She also received surgery to remove a scar on her arm.

== Discography ==
=== Singles ===
List of singles, showing year released, selected chart positions, sales figures, and name of the album
Title	Year	Peak chart positions	Sales	Album
Title	Year	KOR	Sales	Album
"It's Over" (Speed feat. Park Bo-young)	2013	43	KOR: 117,607	Superior Speed
"The Moment I See You"	2025	—	—	Non-album single
"—" denotes a recording that did not chart or was not released in that territory

=== Soundtrack appearances ===
List of soundtrack appearances, showing year released, selected chart positions, sales figures, and name of the album
Title	Year	Peak chart positions	Sales	Album
Title	Year	KOR	Sales	Album
"Free Time" (자유시대)	2008	—	N/A	Scandal Makers OST
"My Prince" (나의 왕자님)	2012	7	KOR: 516,043	A Werewolf Boy OST
"Boiling Youth" (피끓는 청춘)	2014	—	N/A	Hot Young Bloods OST
"Leave" (떠난다)	2015	55	KOR: 85,683	Oh My Ghost OST
"Listen to Me" (내 얘기 좀 들어봐)	2018	—	N/A	On Your Wedding Day OST
"—" denotes a recording that did not chart or was not released in that territory
