= Abyss (TV series) =

2019 South Korean television series

- Promotional poster
- Hangul: 어비스
- RR: Eobiseu
- MR: Ŏbisŭ
- Genre: Romantic comedy; Fantasy; Crime
- Created by: Studio Dragon
- Written by: Moon Soo-yeon
- Directed by: Yoo Je-won
- Starring: Park Bo-young; Ahn Hyo-seop; Lee Sung-jae
- Country of origin: South Korea
- Original language: Korean
- No. of episodes: 16

Production
- Producers: Lee Hyang-bong; Bae Lik-hyeon
- Camera setup: Single-camera
- Running time: 60 minutes
- Production company: Neo Entertainment

Original release
- Network: tvN
- Release: May 6 – June 25, 2019

Related
- Abyss: Another Universe

Abyss (Korean: 어비스; RR: Eobiseu) is a 2019 South Korean television series starring Park Bo-young, Ahn Hyo-seop and Lee Sung-jae. It aired on tvN's Mondays and Tuesdays at 21:30 (KST).

== Synopsis ==
Go Se-yeon (Park Bo-young) is a beautiful prosecution lawyer at the top of her game, and Cha Min (Ahn Hyo-seop) is his friend, an unattractive but rich heir to a cosmetics empire. They are both revived into different bodies by supernatural beings using an "Abyss" after their deaths in separate incidents. The "Abyss" is a celestial object which has the power to revive anything that has died; the reincarnated bodies take on the appearance of that person's soul. Go Se-yeon takes on a 'plainer' appearance, whilst Cha Min becomes very attractive and young; virtually the opposite of before. They start working together to find out the reason for their revival and who caused Go Se-yeon's death.

== Cast ==
=== Main ===
- Park Bo-young as Go Se-yeon (after reincarnation) / Lee Mi-do (before plastic surgery)
  - Kim Sa-rang as Go Se-yeon (before her death)
  - Lee Soo-min as young Go Se-yeon

A prosecution lawyer who is murdered by the Eomsan-dong serial killer. She tries to figure out who killed her and how she has been reincarnated.

- Ahn Hyo-seop as Cha Min
  - Ahn Se-ha as Cha Min (before his death)
  - Yang Han-yeol as young Cha Min

The rich yet unattractive successor to a cosmetics company who is reincarnated as an attractive young man after his death. He has been friends with Go Se-yeon since childhood.

- Lee Sung-jae as Oh Yeong-cheol / Oh Seong-cheol

A skilled surgeon who is referred to as a legend in the medical community. He has a mysterious demeanour and hidden secrets.

=== Supporting ===
==== Central District Prosecutors' Office / Dongbu Police Station ====
- Kwon Soo-hyun as Seo Ji-wook / Oh Tae-jin
  - Kim Yeon-ung as young Seo Ji-wook

A prosecution lawyer and one of Go Se-yeon's colleagues before her death.

- Lee Si-eon as Park Dong-cheol

The police detective who is head of the investigation into Go Se-yeon's death.

- Song Sang-eun as Lee Mi-do (after plastic surgery)

Go Se-yeon's former colleague and Dong-cheol's ex-girlfriend, who has left Korea for the United States.

==== Lan Cosmetics ====
- Han So-hee as Jang Hee-jin / Oh Su-jin
  - Shim Hye-yeon as young Oh Su-jin (Ep. 5)
  - Kang Ye-seo as teenage Oh Su-jin

Cha Min's fiancée who mysteriously disappears just before their wedding.

- Yoon Yoo-sun as Eom Ae-ran

Cha Min's domineering mother and head of the family's cosmetics empire.

- Park Sung-yeon as Park Mi-soon

Cha Min's nanny and housekeeper.

- Lee Ji-hyun as Jang Sun-young

Jang Hee-jin's mother.

==== Others ====
- Lee Cheol-min as Park Gi-man

The vengeful father of a victim of the Eomsan-dong serial killer.

- Choi Da-in as Park Mi-jin

Gi-man's daughter who is a victim of the Eomsan-dong serial killer.

- Lee Dae-yeon as Seo Cheon-shik

Seo Ji-wook's father who is a chief judge.

- Ha Sung-kwan as Se-yeon's father
- Park Mi-hyun as Se-yeon's mother
- Kim Yoon-bo as Kim Sil-jang

The secretary of the chairman of Lan Cosmetics.

- Kim Sung-bum as Detective Choi

A detective in Team 1 and Park Dong-cheol's junior and right-hand man.

=== Special appearances ===
- Seo In-guk as male alien "grim reaper" (Ep. 1) (Note: The character appears in a short crossover scene, alluding Director Yoo Je-won's previous work The Smile Has Left Your Eyes (2018) where the character originally appears.)
- Jung So-min as female alien "grim reaper" (Ep. 1)

== Production ==
The first script reading took place in February 2019 in Sangam-dong, Seoul, South Korea.

Actors Seo In-guk and Jung So-min, who acted in The Smile Has Left Your Eyes (2018), made a special appearance.

== Original soundtrack ==
Abyss OST

Soundtrack album by Various artists
- Recorded: 2019
- Genre: Soundtrack
- Languages: Korean; English
- Labels: Stone Music Entertainment; Genie Music

=== Part 1 ===
Released on May 14, 2019
No.	Title	Artist	Length
1.	"Into The Abyss"	Suran; Coogie	3:03
2.	"Into The Abyss" (Inst.)		3:03
Total length:			6:06

=== Part 2 ===
Released on May 21, 2019
No.	Title	Artist	Length
1.	"Fallin'"	Kim Feel	3:34
2.	"Fallin'" (Inst.)		3:34
Total length:			7:08

=== Part 3 ===
Released on June 4, 2019
No.	Title	Artist	Length
1.	"Stay"	Kim Bo-hyung	4:08
2.	"Stay" (Inst.)		4:08
Total length:			8:16

Disc 2:
No.	Title	Artist	Length
1.	"Abyss" (Opening Title)	Im Ha-young	1:32
2.	"Alien, Abyss and Resurrection"	Im Ha-young	1:47
3.	"Appearance Calling"	Im Ha-young	1:54
4.	"Big Swirl"	Daniel Lee	1:00
5.	"Couldn't Happen If Normal"	Yoo Jung-hyung	2:39
6.	"Finding for Clue"	Yoo Jung-hyung	2:17
7.	"Gloomy Prelude"	Im Ha-young	1:40
8.	"Good Idea"	Im Ha-young	1:32
9.	"Infallible Operation"	Im Ha-young	1:22
10.	"Mature Friendship"	Im Ha-young	1:03
11.	"Daily Life After False Accusation"	Yoo Jung-hyung	2:11
12.	"Questions being Answered"	Yoo Jung-hyung	1:43
13.	"Rest During Chaos"	Yoo Jung-hyung	2:13
14.	"Rules and Narration of Abyss"	Im Ha-young	3:40
15.	"Sly Look"	Im Ha-young	2:34
16.	"The Thing that Shouldn't Have Happened"	Yoo Jung-hyung	2:02
17.	"Their Sad Time"	Im Ha-young	1:49
18.	"The Man Who's Got His Blood"	Im Ha-young	2:18
Total length:			35:16

== Viewership ==
Abyss : South Korea viewers per episode (thousands)

Season	Episode number																Average
Season	1	2	3	4	5	6	7	8	9	10	11	12	13	14	15	16	Average
1	980	868	776	737	639	837	587	582	627	563	502	482	548	488	518	557	643

Source: Audience measurement performed nationwide by Nielsen Media Research.

Average TV viewership ratings
Ep.	Original broadcast date	Average audience share (Nielsen Korea)	
Ep.	Original broadcast date	Nationwide	Seoul
1	May 6, 2019	3.858%	4.836%
2	May 7, 2019	3.682%	4.620%
3	May 13, 2019	3.142%	3.791%
4	May 14, 2019	3.219%	4.024%
5	May 20, 2019	2.743%	3.345%
6	May 21, 2019	3.346%	3.720%
7	May 27, 2019	2.365%	2.817%
8	May 28, 2019	2.339%	2.956%
9	June 3, 2019	2.704%	3.353%
10	June 4, 2019	2.251%	2.979%
11	June 10, 2019	2.273%	2.360%
12	June 11, 2019	2.156%	2.537%
13	June 17, 2019	2.151%	2.370%
14	June 18, 2019	2.035%	2.168%
15	June 24, 2019	2.043%	2.308%
16	June 25, 2019	2.282%	2.889%
Average		2.662%	3.192%
In the table above, the blue numbers represent the lowest ratings and the red numbers represent the highest ratings.; This drama aired on a cable channel/pay TV which normally has a relatively smaller audience compared to free-to-air TV/public broadcasters (KBS, SBS, MBC and EBS).

== Awards and nominations ==
Year	Award	Category	Recipient	Result	Ref.
2019	12th Korea Drama Awards	Best New Actor	Ahn Hyo-seop	Nominated	
