= Secret Campus (South Korean TV series) =

2006 South Korean television series

- Hangul: 비밀의 교정
- Hanja: 祕密의 校庭
- RR: Bimirui gyojeong
- MR: Pimirŭi kyojŏng
- Written by: Yeon Mi-jung; Lee Hae-jung
- Directed by: Lee Chang-yong
- Country of origin: South Korea
- Original language: Korean
- No. of episodes: 24

Production
- Running time: 40 minutes
- Production company: Educational Broadcasting System

Original release
- Network: EBS1
- Release: May 10 – July 27, 2006

Secret Campus (Korean: 비밀의 교정) is a 2006 South Korean television drama co-written by Yeon Mi-jung and Lee Hae-jung and directed by Lee Chang-yong. It aired on EBS1 from May 10 to July 27, 2006.

== Cast ==
- Yeom Sung-hyun as Moon Seung-jae

The late school heartthrob once perfect in every way, whose sudden death leaves behind secrets that unsettle his friends.

- Lee Do-hyun as Oh Soo-ah

A beautiful and gentle girl admired by many, yet withdrawn and burdened by guilt over Seung-jae's death.

- Seol Sung-min as Seo Jin-woo

A rival of the late Seung-jae who hides his feelings for Soo-ah while living cheerfully despite hardship.

- Park Bo-young as Cha Ah-rang

A reckless girl close to Soo-ah and determined to set her up with Jin-woo.

- Lee Min-ho as Park Doo-hyun

A former soccer prodigy now on the verge of being cut and Eun-ho's twin brother.

- Bae Yu-mi as Park Eun-ho

Doo-hyun's boyish twin sister with dreams of being a photographer.

- Ahn Yong-joon as Lee Gi-yeong

A quiet and mysterious boy who harbors secrets and enjoys sewing.

- Jang Ki-bum as Jang Gi-beom

The class president who has a crush on Ah-rang.

- Choi Cheol-ho as Geography teacher

A tall and handsome teacher who becomes uneasy under Ah-rang's advances.

- Ahn Sun-young as Park Mi-sook

A strict homeroom teacher who struggles to connect with her class but cares deeply for all her students.

- Kim Dae-woo as Yoon Se-in

A quirky womanizer and self-proclaimed dating expert who loves teasing the homeroom teacher.

- Kim Jin-yi as Oh Hye-ra

A Home economics student teacher admired by all the boys.

- Anh Tuấn as Do Hyun

== Production ==
The series was announced on Educational Broadcasting System. Yeum Seung-hyun, Seol Sung-min, Lee Do Hyun, Choi Woon and Bae Yu-mi were cast to appear in the series. Principal photography of the series took place in 2006.

== Release ==
The series was rebroadcast on EBS1 in 2009 and received positive reviews.

== See also ==
- List of teen dramas
