= Strong Girl Nam-soon =

2023 South Korean television series

- Promotional poster
- Hangul: 힘쎈여자 강남순
- Lit.: Strong Woman Gang Nam-soon
- RR: Himssenyeoja Gang Namsun
- MR: Himssenyŏja Kang Namsun
- Genre: Action; Comedy; Crime; Family drama
- Written by: Baek Mi-kyung
- Directed by: Kim Jeong-sik; Lee Kyung-sik
- Starring: Lee Yoo-mi; Kim Jung-eun; Kim Hae-sook; Ong Seong-wu; Byeon Woo-seok
- Music by: Gaemi
- Country of origin: South Korea
- Original language: Korean
- No. of episodes: 16

Production
- Executive producer: Lee Kyung-sik
- Producers: Lim Jong-hwa; Seo Woo-sik; Baek Mi-kyung
- Editor: Jung Il-won
- Running time: 60–64 minutes
- Production companies: Barunson C&C; Story Phoenix; SLL

Original release
- Network: JTBC
- Release: October 7 – November 26, 2023

Related
- Strong Girl Bong-soon

Strong Girl Nam-soon (Korean: 힘쎈여자 강남순) is a 2023 South Korean television series starring Lee Yoo-mi in the title role, along with Kim Jung-eun, Kim Hae-sook, Ong Seong-wu, and Byeon Woo-seok. The series serves as a spin-off to the 2017 series Strong Girl Bong-soon. It aired on JTBC from October 7 to November 26, 2023, every Saturday and Sunday at 22:30 (KST). It is available for streaming on Netflix in selected regions.

The series received audience acclaim, with its final episode recording 10.42% in nationwide ratings.

== Synopsis ==
Gang Nam-soon (Lee Yoo-mi) disappeared in Mongolia as a child. She discovers in Mongolia that she possesses superhuman strength. As an adult, she travels to South Korea to search for her parents where she finds her mother Hwang Geum-joo (Kim Jung-eun) who is a billionaire businesswoman, and her grandmother Gil Joong-gan (Kim Hae-sook), in the Gangnam district. Eventually, Nam-soon, her mother, and grandmother become entangled in a drug case that Detective Gang Hee-sik (Ong Seong-wu) is investigating at a company named Doogo ran by Ryu Shi-oh (Byeon Woo-seok).

== Cast ==
=== Main ===
- Lee Yoo-mi as Gang Nam-soon / Khan Tsetseg
  - Ahn Tae-rin as Tsetseg / young Gang Nam-soon

Second cousin of Do Bong-soon. Like her cousin, she is born with superhuman strength which she inherited from her mother and grandmother.

- Kim Jung-eun as Hwang Geum-joo

Mother of Gang Nam-soon who is a CEO of Gangnam pawnshop "Gold Blue". Like her daughter, she is born with superhuman strength.

- Kim Hae-sook as Gil Joong-gan

Grandmother of Gang Nam-soon and mother of Hwang Geum-joo. Like her daughter and granddaughter, she is born with superhuman strength.

- Ong Seong-wu as Gang Hee-sik

A lieutenant in the Gangnam Han River District Police Department who specializes in investigating drug cases.

- Byeon Woo-seok as Ryu Shi-oh / Anton

CEO of the distribution and sales company "Doogo", and the main antagonist of the series

=== Supporting ===
==== People around Gang Nam-soon ====
- Lee Seung-joon as Gang Bong-go

Nam-soon's father and Geum-joo's melodramatic ex-husband who runs a photo studio after divorce.

- Han Sang-jo as Gang Nam-in

Nam-soon's twin younger brother who is an owner of Tarot Cafe in the 1st floor of Geum-joo's building.

- Kim Ki-doo as Hwang Geum-dong

Nam-soon's maternal uncle, Geum-joo's younger brother, and Joong-gan's son.

- Joo Woo-jae as Ji Hyun-soo

A homeless person who becomes entangled with Nam-soon.

- Park Gyeong-ree as Noh Seon-saeng (Teacher Noh)

A romantic homeless person who has no money but has a boyfriend in Hyun-soo.

==== Gangnam Hangang District Police Station ====
- Young Tak as Oh Young-tak

A passionate detective who is Hee-sik's partner and senior in the drug investigation team.

- Ryu Ha-seong as Jin Seon-gyu

The youngest member of the drug investigation team.

- Song Jin-woo as Kim Seok-ho

A member of the drug investigation team who is a former bodyguard and taekwondo police officer.

- Jeong Seung-gil as Ha Dong-seok

A former special forces officer and leader of the drug investigation team.

- Kim Si-hyeon as Yeo Ji-hyeon

A police officer at district police station and Hee-sik's fellow.

==== People around Hwang Geum-joo ====
- Choi Hee-jin as Ri Hwa-ja / Lee Myung-hee

A lost girl who resembles Nam-soon.

- Oh Jeong-yeon as Jung Na-young

Geum-joo's trusted secretary.

- Akira as Bread Song / Song Soo-hyun

A very sexy and handsome fraudster.

- Lee Joong-ok as Kim Nam-gil

Geum-joo's subordinate at Gold Blue.

==== People around Gil Joong-gan ====
- Jeong Bo-seok as Seo Jun-hee

Barista of tarot cafe run by Nam-in.

- Im Ha-ryong as Hwang Guk-jong

Joong-gan's husband who becomes a monk.

==== People around Ryu Shi-oh ====
- Yoon Seong-su as Secretary Yoon

Ryu Shi-oh's secretary with fluent English skills who suffers from gaslighting by Shi-oh.

- Konstantin Vlasov as Kyle Alexandros

Ryu Shi-oh's bodyguard who is a Russian jiujitsu champion.

==== Others ====
- Tserenbold Tsegmid as Khokho

A Mongolian shepherd who raised Nam-soon.

- Batsumiya Batdorj as Joljaya

A Mongolian shepherd and Khokho's wife who raised Nam-soon alongside him.

=== Extended ===
- Lee Chang-ho as Nam Hong-do

Bread Song's secretary.

- Kang Gil-woo as Dr. Choi

A researcher at a drug factory.

- Ha Dong-joon as chief accountant at Gold Blue
- Park Hye-na as Madam Marie Kim
- Lee Hee-jin as Assistant Manager Baek

=== Special appearances ===
- Kim Won-hae as polearm seller (Ep. 1)
- Park Bo-young as Do Bong-soon (Ep. 3)
- Park Hyung-sik as Ahn Min-hyuk (Ep. 3)
- Jeon Soo-kyeong as Gang Hee-sik's mother (Ep. 4, 16)
- Lee Hong-nae as Bingbing (Ep. 16)
- Oh Na-ra as Yoon-hee (Ep. 16)

== Original soundtrack ==
=== Part 1 ===
Released on October 8, 2023
No.	Title	Lyrics	Music	Artist	Length
1.	"Superpowers"	WarmIt (MonoTree)	Anymasingga; Fuxxy (MonoTree); Alina Smith; Annalise Morelli; Gino Barletta	Itzy	2:56
2.	"Superpowers" (Inst.)		Anymasingga; Fuxxy (MonoTree); Alina Smith; Annalise Morelli; Gino Barletta		2:56
Total length:					5:52

=== Part 2 ===
Released on October 15, 2023
No.	Title	Lyrics	Music	Artist	Length
1.	"Be Your Love"	Park Sol; Nod	Nod; Park Sol	Junggigo	3:12
2.	"Be Your Love" (Inst.)		Nod; Park Sol		3:12
Total length:					6:24

=== Part 3 ===
Released on October 21, 2023
No.	Title	Lyrics	Music	Artist	Length
1.	"S.O.S"	Humbler	Humbler; Boran; Jessica Pierpoint; Park Sol; Kim Ki-jeong	YongYong	3:12
2.	"S.O.S" (Inst.)		Humbler; Boran; Jessica Pierpoint; Park Sol; Kim Ki-jeong		3:12
Total length:					6:24

=== Part 4 ===
Released on October 28, 2023
No.	Title	Lyrics	Music	Artist	Length
1.	"Love Blooms"	Kim Si-on; Glen Choi; Renée	Glen Choi; Kim Si-on; Renée; Jeong Su-wan	Moonbyul (Mamamoo)	3:14
2.	"Love Blooms" (Inst.)		Glen Choi; Kim Si-on; Renée; Jeong Su-wan		3:14
Total length:					6:28

=== Part 5 ===
Released on November 4, 2023
No.	Title	Lyrics	Music	Artist	Length
1.	"Wonder Woman"	Yelo; Pdly; Le'mon	Ant; Pdly; Yelo; Le'mon; De View; Wonder B	Adora	3:20
2.	"Wonder Woman" (Inst.)		Ant; Pdly; Yelo; Le'mon; De View; Wonder B		3:20
Total length:					6:40

=== Part 6 ===
Released on November 11, 2023
No.	Title	Lyrics	Music	Artist	Length
1.	"I Wanna Fly"	LooGone; Han Kyung-soo	LooGone; Han Kyung-soo; $$AM (PaperMaker)	Weeekly	3:07
2.	"I Wanna Fly" (Inst.)		LooGone; Han Kyung-soo; $$AM (PaperMaker)		3:07
Total length:					6:14

== Viewership ==
Strong Girl Nam-soon : South Korea viewers per episode (millions)

Season	Episode number																Average
Season	1	2	3	4	5	6	7	8	9	10	11	12	13	14	15	16	Average
1	1.154	1.558	2.052	2.318	1.879	2.134	1.811	2.123	1.811	2.138	1.934	2.200	1.871	2.080	2.242	2.652	1.750

Source: Audience measurement performed nationwide by Nielsen Korea.

Average TV viewership ratings
Ep.	Original broadcast date	Average audience share (Nielsen Korea)	
Ep.	Original broadcast date	Nationwide	Seoul
1	October 7, 2023	4.296% (1st)	4.822% (1st)
2	October 8, 2023	6.062% (1st)	5.848% (1st)
3	October 14, 2023	8.002% (1st)	8.950% (1st)
4	October 15, 2023	9.760% (1st)	10.547% (1st)
5	October 21, 2023	7.278% (1st)	7.928% (1st)
6	October 22, 2023	8.096% (1st)	8.402% (1st)
7	October 28, 2023	7.344% (1st)	8.395% (1st)
8	October 29, 2023	8.472% (1st)	9.050% (1st)
9	November 4, 2023	7.139% (1st)	7.688% (1st)
10	November 5, 2023	8.720% (1st)	9.292% (1st)
11	November 11, 2023	7.571% (1st)	7.890% (1st)
12	November 12, 2023	8.474% (1st)	9.014% (1st)
13	November 18, 2023	7.381% (1st)	8.294% (1st)
14	November 19, 2023	8.986% (1st)	9.553% (1st)
15	November 25, 2023	8.989% (1st)	9.605% (1st)
16	November 26, 2023	10.420% (1st)	11.108% (1st)
Average		7.937%	8.524%
In the table above, the blue numbers represent the lowest ratings and the red numbers represent the highest ratings.; This series aired on a cable channel/pay TV which normally has a relatively smaller audience compared to free-to-air TV/public broadcasters (KBS, SBS, MBC, and EBS).
