= Don't Click (2012 film) =

- Hangul: 미확인 동영상: 절대클릭금지
- Lit.: Unidentified Video: Absolutely Do Not Click
- RR: Mihwagin dongyeongsang: jeoldaekeullikgeumji
- MR: Mihwagin tongyŏngsang: chŏldaek'ŭllikkŭmji
- Directed by: Kim Tae-kyung
- Written by: Kim Tae-hyoung; Hong Geon-guk; Kim Tae-kyung
- Produced by: Ahn Dong-kyu; Cha Ji-hyeon; Jang Won-seok
- Starring: Park Bo-young; Joo Won; Kang Byul
- Cinematography: Kim Gi-tae
- Edited by: Kim Sun-min
- Music by: Seong Ji-dam
- Distributed by: Showbox/Mediaplex
- Release date: May 31, 2012
- Running time: 93 minutes
- Country: South Korea
- Language: Korean
- Box office: US$5 million

Don't Click (Korean: 미확인 동영상: 절대클릭금지) is a 2012 South Korean horror film about a "forbidden video" that curses people to death.

== Production ==
The movie was the first for actress Park Bo-young to appear semi nude on any film. The abandoned factory scene had to be filmed by a smartphone hold by the actress Park Bo-young. Actress Kang Byul had to practice valley dancing for the movie, and had to drink tea for the excessive screaming she had to do for the movie.

== Plot ==
Se-hee is a shop attendant who lives alone with her sister, the high school student Jung-mi, due to their mother's death and their father's decision to work in the United States. Due to a misunderstanding, she is estranged from her boyfriend, the IT college student Joon-hyuk, who tries to make amends by asking Jung-mi to convince Se-hee for a reconciliation. In exchange, Jung-mi, who secretly earns money for both her and Se-hee's tuition by uploading viral videos, wants him to download a blocked video supposedly cursed to kill its viewers.

The video that Joon-hyuk retrieved is revealed to be a series of clips, 108 in total, which changes content after each viewing. The clips are about various things, including what appears to be witchcraft and sexual harassment of a middle-aged man towards a drunken woman. Since viewing the video, both Jung-mi and Se-hee begin to feel haunted by a presence. An internet artist whom Jung-mi sends the video to also becomes haunted and is eventually crushed by an elevator when she tries to escape; a snuff clip of the killing is later made a part of the cursed video. Meanwhile, anonymous videos of Jung-mi doing a stripping dance and the subsequent commotion she causes inside a train go viral; these combined with the aforementioned haunting make Jung-mi deeply paranoid and violent.

Worried, Se-hee asks for Joon-hyuk's assistance to record Jung-mi's activities by placing security cameras around the house. At one point, Jung-mi escapes towards an abandoned house, which was formerly inhabited by the man who did the harassment from the video. Joon-hyuk searches about the identity of the man and finds out that he did not "harass" the drunken woman; in fact, he only wanted to give her solace, but the girl who made the amateur recording uploaded it as harassment anyway. The man committed suicide in shame, his wife died of heart attack after hearing it, while their daughter, who was bullied for the incident, attempted a viral suicide that went unrecorded due to a brief blockade imposed by the site. However, before she died, the daughter was able to create the cursed video.

Se-hee and Joon-hyuk race towards the abandoned house and discover the decapitated remains of the girl who made the "harassment video", before finding Jung-mi. The trio find the doll used for the curse and burn it as well as the flash drive containing the cursed video. The three head back to Se-hee and Jung-mi's house thinking that they are safe, but it is revealed that the curse is still active. Both Joon-hyuk and Jung-mi die in their attempt to stop the curse, while Se-hee is confronted by the daughter at the rooftop. Declaring that she should come to hell with her, the daughter corners Se-hee into jumping from the rooftop.

The next morning, Se-hee is revealed to have survived her fall. However, she panics upon seeing all the videos and cameras carried by the reporters who came to the scene, implying that she is still haunted by the curse.

== Cast ==
- Park Bo-young as Se-hee
- Joo Won as Joon-hyuk
- Kang Byul as Jung-mi
- Lee Malg-eum as young girl
- Kang Hae-in as the clever one
- Choi Ji-heon as Ji-heon
- Soo-min as Soo-min
- Lee Jeong-min as Sang-mi
- Kim Min-hyuk as Detective Kim
- Nam Kyeong-eup as Detective Jang

== Release ==
Don't Click was originally slated to be released during the summer of 2011, but because of lack of screens available, it was pushed back to the autumn/winter season. Distributor Showbox/Mediaplex then decided to push the movie's release to the summer of 2012, believing horror films generally do better business during that season.

== Awards and nominations ==
Year	Award	Category	Recipient	Result
2012	49th Grand Bell Awards	Popularity Award	Park Bo-young	Nominated
2012	49th Grand Bell Awards	Popularity Award	Joo Won	Nominated
2013	49th Baeksang Arts Awards	Most Popular - Actor (Film)	Joo Won	Nominated

== See also ==
- Red Room Curse, a Japanese urban legend
- Chain Mail, a 2015 Philippine film
- Deleter, a 2022 Philippine film
- Don't Click, a 2020 Canadian film
- FeardotCom, a 2002 American film with a similar plot
- Pulse, a 2001 Japanese film
- The Ring, a Japanese film franchise
- Unborn but Forgotten, a 2002 Korean film
