= Superior Speed =

Superior SPEED

Studio album by Speed
- Released: January 15, 2013
- Studio: Core Contents Media
- Genres: K-pop, dance-pop
- Length: 37:03
- Language: Korean
- Labels: Core Contents Media, LOEN Entertainment
- Producers: Shinsadong Tiger, Brave Brothers

Speed chronology
Superior SPEED (2013)	Speed Circus (2014)

Singles from Superior SPEED
- 1. "슬픈약속 (That's My Fault)" Released: January 7, 2013; 2. "It's Over" Released: January 15, 2013

Repackage album
- Re-package cover album

Singles from Blow Speed
- 1. "통증 (Pain, the Love of Heart)" Released: February 20, 2013

Superior Speed is the debut studio album by South Korea boy group Speed. The album marks the first release without members Kanghaeng and Noori, and the group's official sub-unit debut. The album and repackage was preceded by promotional singles "It's Over" and "Pain, the Love of Heart"

== Release ==
On December 9, 2012, Core Contents Media released the first teaser photo for "It's Over". Before the release of the album, Speed's they released digital single "Speed of Light" featuring 슬플약속 (That's My Fault). The album followed a few days later.

A total of 5 music videos were released to promote the album; Two music videos were released for the song "Sad Promise" featuring Davichi's Kang Min-kyung; a dance version, and a drama version featuring Park Bo-young, A Pink's Naeun, Ji Chang-wook and Ha Seok-jin. Two music videos for official title track "It's Over" featuring Park Bo-young were released; another dance version and a Drama Version serving as a continuation to the Sad Promise Drama video, and a music video for repackage single "Pain, the Love of Heart".

== Track listing ==
Superior Speed
No.	Title	Lyrics	Music	Arrangement	Length
1.	"빵빵" (Bbang bbang, "S, P, double E, D's back")	Double Kick, David Kim, Tae-woon of Speed	Double Kick, Seidon	Double Kick	2:46
2.	"It's Over" (feat. Park Bo-young)	Shinsadong Tiger, Kim Tae-joo, Hyuwoo	Shinsadong Tiger, Kim Tae-joo, Hyuwoo	Shinsadong Tiger, Kim Tae-joo, Hyuwoo	3:56
3.	"슬픈약속" (Seulpeunyaksok, That's My Fault, feat. Kang Min-kyung of Davichi)	Double Kick, Glory of The face	Double Kick, David Kim	Glory of The face	4:02
4.	"Luv Ya"	Double Kick	Double Kick	Ichiro Suezawa	3:35
5.	"지독히도 가슴아픈 사랑" (Jidokhido gaseum-apeun sarang, Never Say Goodbye)	The Double Kick Team	The Double Kick Team	The Double Kick Team	3:36
6.	"I Do I Do" (feat. The Seeya)	Double Kick, David Kim, Tae-woon of Speed	Double Kick, Seidon	Double Kick	3:35
7.	"하루종일" (Harujong-il, One Day)	Ahn Young-min	Ahn Young-min	Ahn Young-min	4:10
8.	"It's Over" (Only Speed)	Shinsadong Tiger, Kim Tae-joo, Hyuwoo	Shinsadong Tiger, Kim Tae-joo, Hyuwoo	Shinsadong Tiger, Kim Tae-joo, Hyuwoo	3:56
9.	"슬픈약속" (Seulpeunyaksok, That's My Fault, inst.)		Double Kick, David Kim	Glory of The face	4:02
10.	"It's Over" (inst.)		Shinsadong Tiger, Kim Tae-joo, Hyuwoo	Shinsadong Tiger, Kim Tae-joo, Hyuwoo	3:56
Total length:					37:03

Blow Speed
No.	Title	Lyrics	Music	Arrangement	Length
1.	"통증" (Tongjeung, Pain the Love of Heart)	Brave Brothers	Brave Brothers	Elephant empire, Lee Jung min	3:29
2.	"빵빵" (Bbang bbang, "S, P, double E, D's back)	Double Kick, David Kim, Tae-woon of Speed	Double Kick, Seidon	Double Kick	2:46
3.	"It's Over" (feat. Park Bo-young)	Shinsadong Tiger, Kim Tae-joo, Hyuwoo	Shinsadong Tiger, Kim Tae-joo, Hyuwoo	Shinsadong Tiger, Kim Tae-joo, Hyuwoo	3:56
4.	"슬픈약속" (Seulpeunyaksok, That's My Fault (feat. Kang Min-kyung of Davichi))	Double Kick, Glory of The face	Double Kick, David Kim	Glory of The face	4:02
5.	"Luv Ya"	Double Kick	Double Kick	Ichiro Suezawa	3:35
6.	"지독히도 가슴아픈 사랑" (Jidokhido gaseum-apeun sarang, Never Say Goodbye)	The Double Kick Team	The Double Kick Team	The Double Kick Team	3:36
7.	"I do I do" (feat. The Seeya)	Double Kick, David Kim, Tae-woon of Speed	Double Kick, Seidon	Double Kick	3:35
8.	"하루종일" (Harujong-il, One Day)	Ahn Young-min	Ahn Young-min	Ahn Young-min	4:10
9.	"It's Over" (Only Speed)	Shinsadong Tiger, Kim Tae-joo, Hyuwoo	Shinsadong Tiger, Kim Tae-joo, Hyuwoo	Shinsadong Tiger, Kim Tae-joo, Hyuwoo	3:56
10.	"슬픈약속" (Seulpeunyaksok, That's My Fault, inst.)		Double Kick, David Kim	Glory of The face	4:02
11.	"It's Over" (inst.)		Shinsadong Tiger, Kim Tae-joo, Hyuwoo	Shinsadong Tiger, Kim Tae-joo, Hyuwoo	3:56
Total length:					40:32

== Charts ==
=== Album charts ===
Chart	Sales
South Korea (Gaon)	2,726

=== Single charts ===
Superior Speed

- 슬픈약속 (That's My Fault)

Chart (2013)	Peak position
Gaon Singles chart	24
Gaon Monthly Singles chart	70
Gaon Local Singles chart	24
Gaon Streaming Singles chart	47
Gaon Download Singles chart	15
Gaon Background Music chart	50
Gaon Mobile Ringtone chart	82

Blow speed

- 통증 (Pain the Love of Heart)

Chart (2013)	Peak position
Gaon Singles chart	76
Gaon Monthly Singles chart	2
Gaon Local Singles chart	76
Gaon Streaming Singles chart	100
Gaon Download Singles chart	55

== Release history ==
Region	Format	Date	Label	Edition
Worldwide	Digital download	January 15, 2013	Core Contents Media; LOEN Entertainment	Regular edition
South Korea	CD	January 23, 2013	Core Contents Media; LOEN Entertainment	Regular edition
Worldwide	Digital download	February 20, 2013	Core Contents Media; LOEN Entertainment	Re-package album
