= Our Unwritten Seoul =

2025 South Korean television series

- Promotional poster
- Hangul: 미지의 서울
- Lit.: Unknown Seoul
- RR: Mijiui Seoul
- MR: Mijiŭi Sŏul
- Genre: Coming-of-age; Romance
- Developed by: Studio Dragon
- Written by: Lee Kang
- Directed by: Park Shin-woo
- Starring: Park Bo-young; Park Jin-young; Ryu Kyung-soo
- Music by: Nam Hye-seung
- Country of origin: South Korea
- Original language: Korean
- No. of episodes: 12

Production
- Running time: 70 minutes
- Production companies: Monster Union; Higround; Next Scene

Original release
- Network: tvN; Netflix
- Release: May 24 – June 29, 2025

Our Unwritten Seoul (Korean: 미지의 서울) is a 2025 South Korean television series starring Park Bo-young, Park Jin-young, and Ryu Kyung-soo. It aired on tvN from May 24, to June 29, 2025, every Saturday and Sunday at 21:20 (KST). It is available for streaming on Netflix.

== Synopsis ==
Yoo Mi-ji and Yoo Mi-rae are identical twins with opposite personalities and lifestyles. Mi-ji was a promising sprinter, but she has now quit sports due to an injury and is living a free-spirited life in her hometown of Duson-ri, taking care of her grandmother without a plan for her future. Mi-rae has always been a model student and is a perfectionist working at a public corporation in Seoul. When Mi-ji finds out that her sister is struggling with workplace bullying, she suggests that they swap places for a few months.

== Cast ==
=== Main ===
- Park Bo-young as Yoo Mi-ji and Yoo Mi-rae
  - Lee Jae-in as teen Yoo Mi-ji and Yoo Mi-rae
    - Yoo Mi-ji: The younger of the twins, she works various jobs in Duson-ri, having chosen to stay in her hometown to care for her grandmother after the latter's stroke. She was a promising athlete but lost her chance to compete in the Olympic Games due to a sports leg injury.
    - Yoo Mi-rae: The older twin; she works at a corporate job in Seoul. She is academically gifted but lacks physical strength due to an underlying medical condition.
- Park Jin-young as Lee Ho-soo, a high school classmate of the Yoo twins who is now a lawyer at a prestigious law firm. He lost his hearing in his left ear following a car accident in which his father died. He has liked Mi-ji since they were young.
  - Park Yoon-ho as teen Lee Ho-soo
  - Kang Ye-chan as child Lee Ho-soo
- Ryu Kyung-soo as Han Se-jin, a man who starts as a hedge fund chief investment officer but later becomes a strawberry farm owner in Duson-ri.

=== Supporting ===
==== People around Mi-ji and Mi-rae ====
- Jang Young-nam as Kim Ok-hee, the twins' mother and an elementary school lunch lady. She is a strong-willed single mother who has been the head of her household for nearly 30 years. She favors Mi-rae.
- Cha Mi-kyung as Kang Wol-soon, the grandmother of the twins and a former beauty salon owner. She helped with childcare and housework before suffering a stroke.
- Moon Dong-hyeok as Song Gyeong-gu, the assistant manager of Kyunggu Mart, as well as Mi-ji's ex-boyfriend and current best friend.
- Yoo Yoo-jin as Park Ji-yoon, a high school friend of Mi-ji and Mi-rae.

==== People around Lee Ho-soo ====
- Im Chul-soo as Lee Chung-goo, Lee Ho-soo's senior colleague and a highly capable lawyer known for his impressive win rate.
- Kim Sun-young as Yeom Beon-hong, Lee Ho-soo's mother and vice principal of an elementary school. She has been a long-time neighbor of the twins' family in Duson-ri.
- Shin Jeong-won as Hwang Ji-soo, Lee Ho-soo's secretary at Wongeun Law Firm.

==== Korea Finance Management Corporation staff ====
- Jeong Seung-gil as Choi Tae-gwan, director of the Planning and Coordination Bureau.
- Lee Si-hoon as Shin Gyeong-min, head of the Planning Strategy Team.
- Go Ae-ri as Ahn Mi-jung, a member of the Planning Strategy Team.
- Yang Dae-hyeok as Hwang Yun-ho, a member of the Planning Strategy Team.
- Sim So-young as Lee Hyo-kyung, a member of the Planning Strategy Team.
- Hong Sung-won as Kim Tae-yi, a data analyst.
- Park Ye-young as Kim Soo-yeon, a former member of the Planning Strategy Team.
- Nam Yoon-ho as Park Sang-young

==== Others ====
- Jung Eun-pyo as Jo Myeong-gap, president of the Duson-ri Youth Association.
- Kim Kyung-duk as Kong Il-nam, a shopkeeper at Seedong Market and a Youth Association member.
- Won Mi-kyung as Kim Ro-sa/Hyeon Sang-wol:
  - Moon Su-a as young Hyeon Sang-wol.
  - Kim Do-eun as child Hyeon Sang-wol, the owner of Ro-sa's Restaurant, who is diagnosed with dyslexia.
- Park Hwan-hee as Kim Ro-sa:
  - Kim Tae-yeon as child Kim Ro-sa, a poet who graduated from Seoul National University.

=== Special appearance ===
- Kim Joo-hun as Ho-soo's father

== Episodes ==
No.	Title	Directed by	Written by	Original release date
1	"Mi-ji, Yet Unknown"; Transliteration: "Mi-ji; ajik moreunda" (Korean: 미지; 아직 모른다)	Park Shin-woo	Lee Kang	May 24, 2025
Mi-ji and Mi-rae, two identical twins who took very different paths in life, haven't seen each other in over a year. When Mi-ji learns from Ho-soo that he ran into Mi-rae in Seoul and she seemed unwell, she decides to visit her. As Mi-rae confesses she is being bullied at work, Mi-ji convinces her to swap places.
2	"Review and Reassess"; Transliteration: "Manjeomja-ui odapnoteu" (Korean: 만점자의 오답노트)	Park Shin-woo	Lee Kang	May 25, 2025
Thinking of doing Mi-rae a favor, Mi-ji naively agrees to convince Mrs. Kim Ro-sa to sell her restaurant to carry forward a redevelopment project that's crucial for KFMC. Back home, Mi-rae struggles at Mi-ji's new job at a strawberry farm, ultimately clashing with the owner, Han Se-jin, and quitting.
3	"Knock, Knock! Please Open Your Heart"; Transliteration: "Ttokttok! mun jom yeoleojuseyo" (Korean: 똑 똑 문 좀 열어주세요)	Park Shin-woo	Lee Kang	May 31, 2025
Mi-rae returns to work at the strawberry farm, finding a rhythm with Se-jin. Mi-ji wins over Ro-sa, who agrees to meet with the company for the young woman's sake, while Ho-soo quits his job at the law firm.
4	"My Nemesis"; Transliteration: "Na-ui cheonjeok" (Korean: 나의 천적)	Park Shin-woo	Lee Kang	June 1, 2025
Ho-soo becomes Ro-sa's lawyer. When the woman has a fall, Mi-ji relives the trauma of when her grandmother had the stroke that left her bedridden. Mi-rae finds out that her mother respects her mainly because she pays for her grandma's medical care.
5	"Alone With You"; Transliteration: "Geudae-wa honjaseo" (Korean: 그대와 혼자서)	Park Shin-woo	Lee Kang	June 7, 2025
Mi-ji is perplexed by Ho-soo's confession that she was his first love, having long believed it was Mi-rae. Ho-soo is also confused by his sudden attraction to Mi-rae. Back home, Mi-rae finds herself in a love triangle with Se-jin and Mi-ji's ex Gyeong-gu. Remembering her colleagues in Seoul accusing her of seducing their boss, she quits her job at the farm. A drunken Mi-ji confesses her feelings to Ho-soo.
6	"The Silent, Ever-Present Fool"; Transliteration: "Dalgat-eun babo" (Korean: 달같은 바보)	Park Shin-woo	Lee Kang	June 8, 2025
As Mi-rae informs Mi-ji she wants to switch back in a week, Mi-ji struggles whether to tell Ro-sa the truth about a work project she's sworn to secrecy about. Both Gyeong-gu and Ho-soo learn about the swap, but, while Gyeong-gu admits it to Mi-rae, Ho-soo decides to keep quiet until Mi-ji is ready to tell him. Mi-rae helps Se-jin at the farm during a typhoon and stays over. Despite fears of stirring up gossip, Se-jin admits he likes the rumors about them.
7	"A Child Underneath it All"; Transliteration: "Namu sok ai" (Korean: 나무 속 아이)	Park Shin-woo	Lee Kang	June 14, 2025
Ho-soo's former boss, Lee Chung-goo, digs into Ro-sa's past on behalf of KFMC to find something that will force her to sell. Mi-ji learns about the rumors of an affair between Mi-rae and her boss Park Sang-young after having a chance run-in with Park's wife. Se-jin meets Mi-ji for the first time and, upon learning about the twins' interests, realizes the one working for him is actually Mi-rae. Ho-soo confesses his feelings to Mi-ji.
8	"An Unconventional Whole"; Transliteration: "Isanghan hana" (Korean: 이상한 하나)	Park Shin-woo	Lee Kang	June 15, 2025
Mi-ji and Ho-soo start dating in secret. Chung-goo questions Ro-sa about her ties with the deceased Hyeon Sang-wol, pressuring her into selling. Mi-ji finally meets Park Sang-young and notices his striking resemblance with her father. As they were both assigned to the same project, Mi-ji decides to drop out to avoid gossip and asks him to make sure she doesn't get penalized, not knowing he's actually in cahoots with senior management to get rid of her. Mi-rae discovers Se-jin is looking for someone to take over the farm.
9	"Back Again, Once More"; Transliteration: "Dasi, geugot-euro" (Korean: 다시, 그곳으로)	Park Shin-woo	Lee Kang	June 21, 2025
Kim Tae-yi has found evidence to take KFMC down for what they did to his older sister Soo-yeon, but Mi-rae doesn't want to step up once again; however, when Sang-young harasses her for the second time, she decides to finally press charges and fight the company.
10	"Reading You"; Transliteration: "Dangsin-eun ilgneun sigan" (Korean: 당신을 읽는 시간)	Park Shin-woo	Lee Kang	June 22, 2025
Chung-goo leaks Ro-sa's past to the press, and articles framing her as Sang-wol's murderer spread online. Ro-sa tells Mi-ji and Ho-soo that she is actually Sang-wol, and that she is using her dead friend's name to take care of her son after the real Ro-sa died of cancer. Thanks to Ro-sa's will, Ho-soo manages to clear her of charges. Se-jin informs Mi-rae he's going back to the States and offers her to come work for him when the lawsuit is over.
11	"At the End of the Sentence"; Transliteration: "Geu munjang-eui kkeut-eseo" (Korean: 그 문장의 끝에서)	Park Shin-woo	Lee Kang	June 28, 2025
Ho-soo's hearing gets worse and he breaks up with Mi-ji because he doesn't want to be a burden, although they reunite in the end. Mi-rae leaves KFMC, but turns down Se-jin's offer to go with him.
12	"The End is a First Page"; Transliteration: "Majimak cheot peiji" (Korean: 마지막 첫 페이지)	Park Shin-woo	Lee Kang	June 29, 2025
After settling her case, Ro-sa offers Mi-ji to take over the restaurant, but for the time being, Mi-ji wants to study and get a degree. Mi-rae keeps in touch with Se-jin while running the farm and transforms it in a successful business.

== Production ==
=== Development ===
Our Unwritten Seoul was initially a KBS drama, but they encountered difficulties in casting due to the declining competitiveness of their channels. KBS then approached Studio Dragon to co-produce the series and signed a MOU with CJ ENM, handing the drama over to tvN.

Park Shin-woo, who directed Lovestruck in the City (2020–2021), was attached to direct, and Lee Kang of Youth of May (2021) was reported to write the screenplay in December 2024. The series was planned by Studio Dragon and co-produced by Monster Union, Higround, and Next Scene. Screenwriter Kang shared that she wrote the series to tell "stories of people who look fine on the outside but are already wavering and exhausted inside." She imagined how nice it would be if a person who looked exactly like her could replace her, but at the same time wondered if her twin's life would be more peaceful than hers, thus deciding to write about two twin sisters swapping lives.

=== Casting ===
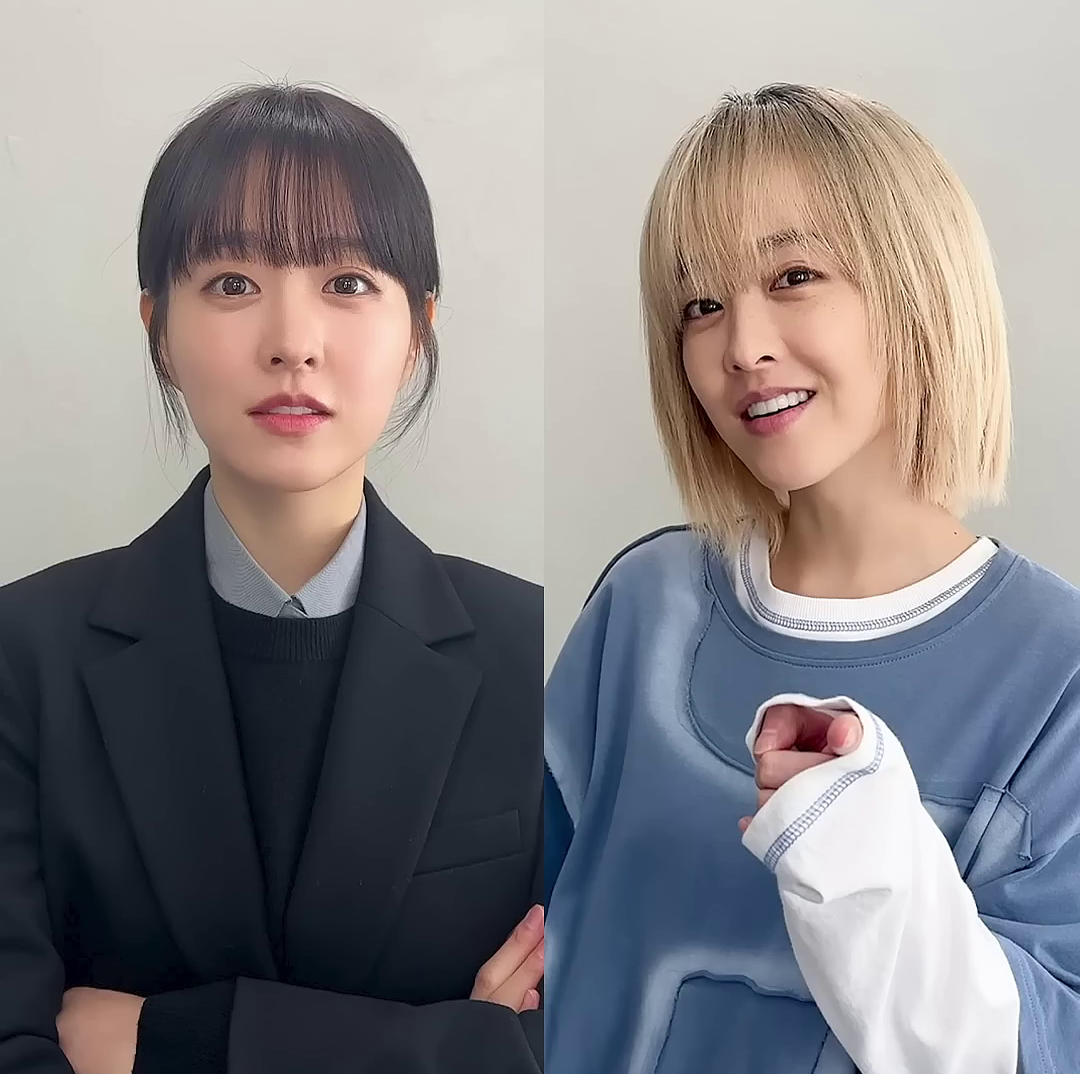
Park Bo-young as Mi-rae (left) and Mi-ji (right)

On July 25, 2024, Newsen reported that Park Bo-young had received an offer for the series, with Ten Asia confirming her appearance on the same day. On September 26, BH Entertainment told Newsen that Park Jin-young was considering the drama as the next project following his discharge from the army. On October 8, News 1 reported that Ryu Kyung-soo had joined the series as one of the leads. On December 3, Park Bo-young and Jin-young were confirmed to appear.

Park Bo-young received the script one year before the series went into production and decided to participate after reading the first episode and being favorably impressed by it. Although there was neither a director nor a broadcaster yet, she thought she would never have a similar opportunity again; she also wanted to play a strong character that would contrast with the sweet and cheerful ones she had played up to that point. Although Park had already played two different roles in Oh My Ghost (2015), she found Our Unwritten Seoul more difficult because she could not imitate another actress' performance to differentiate the two characters: she therefore started from the small details that made Mi-ji and Mi-rae unique, distinguishing them in their voice, clothing, makeup and hairstyle.

Park Jin-young was drawn to the narrative centered on victims or the weak, and found it fascinating that Lee Ho-soo, who is deaf in one ear, tried to listen to others better than a healthy person could. Hong Sung-won had initially auditioned for the roles of Ho-soo and Gyeong-gu before the director offered him the part of Kim Tae-yi.

=== Filming ===
Principal photography began at the end of 2024. The series joined the promotional campaign "Seoul, My Soul" and throughout the episodes, many attractions of the metropolis appear, such as the park north of Dongjak Bridge, the rainbow fountains of Banpo Bridge, Seongsu Naknak, Dongdaemun Design Plaza, Gwangtonggyo Bridge in Cheonggyecheon, Hanbit Square, the LG Twin Towers in Yeouido, Myeong-dong and the hanok district. The countryside scenes were filmed in Mungyeong, Gyeongbuk and Damyang, South Jeolla Province; filming also took place in Dangjin, Gwangju, Suncheon and Hapcheon.

== Original soundtrack ==
The soundtrack features artists such as Choi Yu-ree, 10cm, Hong Isaac, dori, and Elaine. It was led by music director Nam Hye-seung.

=== Album ===
Our Unwritten Seoul (Original Television Soundtrack) Special

Soundtrack album by Various artists
- Released: June 30, 2025
- Genre: Soundtrack
- Length: 1:08:00
- Languages: Korean; English
- Labels: Sori Narly; Studio Dragon

Tracklist

Our Unwritten Seoul (Original Television Soundtrack) Special track listing
No.	Title	Artist	Length
1.	"On Your Side (Opening Title ver.)"	Sion	0:49
2.	"Yellow Spring" (노란봄)	Choi Yu-ree	4:00
3.	"Sunset" (노을)	10cm	3:58
4.	"On Your Side"	Sion	3:26
5.	"In You"	Hong Isaac	3:47
6.	"You"	dori	4:30
7.	"Silence of the Night" (나의 시간 어딘가)	Elaine	4:40
8.	"Yesterday, Today and Tomorrow" (어제 오늘 그리고 내일)	Nam Hye-seung; Park Sang-hee	1:40
9.	"Miji and Mirae" (미지와 미래)	Nam Hye-seung; Cho Mira	2:20
10.	"The Song of Hosu" (호수의 노래)	Kim Kyung-hee	1:13
11.	"Pinky Promise" (손가락 약속)	Park Sang-hee	1:54
12.	"Rumors on rumors" (소문은 꼬리를 물고)	Nam Hye-seung; Park Sang-hee	1:03
13.	"The Long Wait" (오랜 기다림)	Nam Hye-seung; Cho Mira	1:26
14.	"A Warm Heart" (따뜻한 마음)	Lee So-young	1:41
15.	"What You Mean to Me" (너는 내게 이런 의미)	Nam Hye-seung; Park Sang-hee	1:33
16.	"Identical head to toe" (똑같아요)	Park Sang-hee	0:49
17.	"Piece of Cake" (식은 죽 먹기)	Nam Hye-seung; Park Sang-hee	1:10
18.	"Dangerous People" (위험한 사람들)	Park Sang-hee	0:54
19.	"Miji's Seoul Chapter begins" (미지의 서울입성기)	Nam Hye-seung; Park Sang-hee	1:20
20.	"The One Who Understood Me" (나를 읽어준 사람)	Nam Hye-seung; Park Sang-hee	1:38
21.	"Clumsy Again" (실수연발)	Cho Mira	0:30
22.	"That Day, Us" (그날의 우리)	Nam Hye-seung; Ko Eun-jung	2:08
23.	"As We Live" (살다보면)	Jo Hanna	1:41
24.	"Times in My Diary" (일기장 속 시간들)	Nam Hye-seung; Park Sang-hee	1:18
25.	"When the Day Fades" (하루가 저무는 시간)	Nam Hye-seung; Cho Mira	2:12
26.	"Someone's Mother, Someone's Daughter" (누군가의 엄마 누군가의 딸)	Nam Hye-seung; Park Sang-hee	1:49
27.	"One Two Hook"	Kim Kyung-hee	1:09
28.	"Strawberry Field" (딸기밭)	Ko Eun-jung	0:53
29.	"I Love You, Grandma" (사랑해 할머니)	Lee So-young	2:11
30.	"Gentle souls that longed to be trees" (나무가 되고 싶었던 여린 마음들)	Nam Hye-seung; Park Sang-hee	1:24
31.	"Come Back Home"	Nam Hye-seung; Ko Eun-jung	1:56
32.	"To Every Mother and Daughter" (세상의 모든 엄마와 딸에게)	Nam Hye-seung; Park Sang-hee	1:57
33.	"A Taste of Sweetness" (달콤한 맛)	Nam Hye-seung; Ko Eun-jung	1:26
34.	"My Rosa, My Sangwol" (나의 로사, 나의 상월)	Nam Hye-seung; Park Sang-hee	1:21
35.	"Our Tomorrow" (우리들의 내일은)	Nam Hye-seung; Cho Mira	1:11
36.	"Nobody's Fault" (누구의 잘못도 아닌)	Park Sang-hee	0:52
37.	"Driving MAD"	Kim Kyung-hee	1:01

=== Singles ===
Original soundtrack (Part 1–6)

Part 1

Released on May 31, 2025
No.	Title	Lyrics	Music	Artist	Length
1.	"Yellow Spring" (노란봄)	Nam Hye-seung; Park Jin-ho	Nam Hye-seung; Park Jin-ho	Choi Yu-ree	4:00
2.	"Yellow Spring" (Inst.)		Nam Hye-seung; Park Jin-ho		4:00
Total length:					8:00

Part 2

Released on June 7, 2025
No.	Title	Lyrics	Music	Artist	Length
1.	"Hush of Sunset" (노을)	Nam Hye-seung; Park Jin-ho	Nam Hye-seung; Park Jin-ho	10cm	3:58
2.	"Hush of Sunset" (Inst.)		Nam Hye-seung; Park Jin-ho		3:58
Total length:					7:56

Part 3

Released on June 8, 2025
No.	Title	Lyrics	Music	Artist	Length
1.	"On Your Side"	Nam Hye-seung; Park Jin-ho	Nam Hye-seung; Park Jin-ho	Sion	3:26
2.	"On Your Side" (Inst.)		Nam Hye-seung; Park Jin-ho		3:26
Total length:					6:52

Part 4

Released on June 15, 2025
No.	Title	Lyrics	Music	Artist	Length
1.	"In You"	Nam Hye-seung; Park Jin-ho	Nam Hye-seung; Park Jin-ho	Hong Isaac	3:46
2.	"In You" (Inst.)		Nam Hye-seung; Park Jin-ho		3:46
Total length:					7:32

Part 5

Released on June 28, 2025
No.	Title	Lyrics	Music	Artist	Length
1.	"You"	Nam Hye-seung; Park Jin-ho	Nam Hye-seung; Park Jin-ho	dori	4:30
2.	"You" (Inst.)		Nam Hye-seung; Park Jin-ho		4:30
Total length:					9:00

Part 6

Released on June 29, 2025
No.	Title	Lyrics	Music	Artist	Length
1.	"Silence of the Night"	Nam Hye-seung; Park Jin-ho	Nam Hye-seung; Park Jin-ho	Elaine	4:40
2.	"Silence of the Night" (Inst.)		Nam Hye-seung; Park Jin-ho		4:40
Total length:					9:20

== Reception ==
=== Critical response ===
On the review aggregator website Rotten Tomatoes, 100% of 5 critics' reviews are positive.

Our Unwritten Seoul was well received by both critics and audiences. It was praised for its direction, solid screenplay containing words of comfort for modern people, and the actors' performances, in particular Park Bo-young's, who was appreciated for having distinguished the two sisters naturally, without unnecessary emotional excesses.

The popularity of Our Unwritten Seoul was attributed to its greatly empathetic approach to youth, depicting the confusion of a generation that despises itself, but gradually grows and overcomes its self-hatred when it realizes that everyone is suffering from something, creating a ripple effect similar to that of a self-help book, and giving courage to those who were facing difficult challenges. Pop culture critic Jung Deok-hyun observed that, through the fantasy of exchanging lives with another person, the series illustrated the process of finding the true self, forgotten by living without much thought, as well as highlighting an absurd reality in which people survive by thinking they are wrong compared to others. Fellow critic and activist Baek Su-jeong appreciated that disabled people were not portrayed stereotypically as incompetent, marginalized, or geniuses suffering from "savant syndrome," but as people who live their lives and work, taking the successful lawyer Lee Chung-goo as an example.

=== Viewership ===
Our Unwritten Seoul premiered on South Korean cable television channel tvN on May 24, 2025. Its first episode recorded a viewership rating of 3.6%, reaching 5% with the second episode. The ratings grew over the weeks, reaching a national average of 8.4% by the final episode, the highest among the programs in its time slot. It became tvN's highest-rated Saturday and Sunday drama to date, surpassing Resident Playbook. The series was distributed in Korea and internationally on TVING and Netflix; on the latter, it ranked third among the most-watched non-English language programs for the week of May 26 – June 1, 2025. It stayed in the top 10 for five consecutive weeks, garnering more than 112 million hours of viewing.

Our Unwritten Seoul : South Korea viewers per episode (millions)

Season	Episode number												Average
Season	1	2	3	4	5	6	7	8	9	10	11	12	Average
1	0.931	1.297	1.207	1.441	1.104	1.652	1.639	1.911	1.773	2.036	1.780	2.168	1.578

Source: Audience measurement performed nationwide by Nielsen Korea.

Average TV viewership ratings
Ep.	Original broadcast date	Average audience share (Nielsen Korea)	
Ep.	Original broadcast date	Nationwide	Seoul
1	May 24, 2025	3.628% (1st)	4.193% (1st)
2	May 25, 2025	5.049% (1st)	5.577% (1st)
3	May 31, 2025	4.523% (1st)	5.418% (1st)
4	June 1, 2025	5.897% (1st)	6.532% (1st)
5	June 7, 2025	4.358% (1st)	4.883% (1st)
6	June 8, 2025	6.368% (1st)	7.144% (1st)
7	June 14, 2025	6.452% (1st)	6.735% (1st)
8	June 15, 2025	7.377%(1st)	8.325%(1st)
9	June 21, 2025	7.105% (1st)	7.800% (1st)
10	June 22, 2025	7.744% (1st)	8.509% (1st)
11	June 28, 2025	6.951% (1st)	7.232% (1st)
12	June 29, 2025	8.413% (1st)	8.960% (1st)
Average		6.155%	6.776%
In the table above, the blue numbers represent the lowest ratings and the red numbers represent the highest ratings.; This drama airs on a cable channel/pay TV, which normally has a relatively smaller audience compared to free-to-air TV/public broadcasters (KBS, SBS, MBC, and EBS).

== Accolades ==
=== Awards and nominations ===
Name of the award ceremony, year presented, category, nominee of the award, and the result of the nomination
Award ceremony	Year	Category	Nominee	Result	Ref.
APAN Star Awards	2025	Best Director	Park Shin-woo	Nominated	
APAN Star Awards	2025	Best Drama	Our Unwritten Seoul	Nominated	
APAN Star Awards	2025	Best Screenwriter	Lee Kang	Nominated	
APAN Star Awards	2025	Best Supporting Actress	Won Mi-kyung	Nominated	
APAN Star Awards	2025	Top Excellence Award (Actress) - Mid-length Drama	Park Bo-young	Nominated	
Asian Television Awards	2025	Best Original Screen Play	Lee Kang	Nominated	
Baeksang Arts Awards	2026	Best Actress	Park Bo-young	Won	
Baeksang Arts Awards	2026	Best Director	Park Shin-woo	Won	
Baeksang Arts Awards	2026	Best Actor	Park Jin-young	Nominated	
Baeksang Arts Awards	2026	Best Drama	Our Unwritten Seoul	Nominated	
Baeksang Arts Awards	2026	Best Screenwriter	Lee Kang	Nominated	
Baeksang Arts Awards	2026	Best Supporting Actress	Won Mi-kyung	Nominated	
Bechdel Day	2025	Bechdel Choice 10	Our Unwritten Seoul	Top 10	
Bechdel Day	2025	Bechdelian of the Year	Park Bo-young	Won	
Cine21 Awards	2025	Screenwriter of the Year	Lee Kang	Won	
Cine21 Awards	2025	Series Category – Actress of the Year	Park Bo-young	Won	
Cine21 Awards	2025	Series of the Year	Our Unwritten Seoul	1st Place	
CJ ENM Visionary Awards	2026	2026 Visionary	Park Bo-young	Won	
CJ ENM Visionary Awards	2026	2026 Visionary	Lee Kang	Won	
ContentAsia Awards	2026	Best Female Lead in a TV Programme/Series Made in Asia	Park Bo-young	Won	
Daejeon Special FX Film Festival (DFX OTT Awards)	2025	Grand Prize (Daesang)	Park Bo-young	Won	
Dong-A.com's Pick (Note: Award winners are selected by Dong-a Ilbo entertainment reporters.)	2025	Special Award	Park Bo-young	Won	
FUNdex Awards	2025	Best Actress of TV Drama	Park Bo-young	Nominated	
FUNdex Awards	2025	Popular Star Prize (Female)	Park Bo-young	Nominated	
FUNdex Awards	2025	Popular Star Prize (Male)	Park Jin-young	Nominated	
FUNdex Awards	2025	Best TV Drama	Our Unwritten Seoul	Nominated	
Global OTT Awards	2025	Best Actress	Park Bo-young	Nominated	
Global OTT Awards	2025	Best Creative	Our Unwritten Seoul	Nominated	
Global OTT Awards	2025	Best Original Song	"Sunset" by 10cm	Nominated	
Global OTT Awards	2025	Best Supporting Actress	Jang Young-nam	Nominated	
Global OTT Awards	2025	Best Writer	Lee Kang	Nominated	
Korea Drama Awards	2025	Top Excellence Award, Actress	Park Bo-young	Won	
Korea Drama Awards	2025	Best Drama	Our Unwritten Seoul	Nominated	
Korea Drama Awards	2025	Excellence Award, Actor	Park Jin-young	Nominated	
Korea Drama Awards	2025	Popular Couple Award	Park Jin-young and Park Bo-young	Nominated	

=== Listicles ===
Name of publisher, year listed, name of listicle, and placement
Publisher	Year	Listicle	Placement	Ref.
Time	2025	The 10 Best K-Dramas of 2025	5th Place	
Teen Vogue	2025	15 Best K-Dramas of 2025	Included	
Cineplay	2025	Cineplay's 2025 Best Scripted Shows	Included	
South China Morning Post	2025	The 15 best K-dramas of 2025	12th	
Collider	2025	10 Best K-Romances of 2025	9th	
Screen Rant	2025	10 Best K-Dramas of 2025, Ranked	4th	
Entertainment Weekly	2025	The 21 best Korean shows on Netflix to watch now	Included	
