= Strong Girl Bong-soon =

2017 South Korean television series

- Promotional poster
- Also known as: Strong Woman Do Bong Soon
- Hangul: 힘쎈여자 도봉순
- Lit.: Strong Woman Do Bong-soon
- RR: Himssenyeoja Do Bongsun
- MR: Himssenyŏja To Pongsun
- Genre: Crime; Fantasy; Thriller; Action; Romantic comedy
- Written by: Baek Mi-kyung
- Directed by: Lee Hyung-min
- Starring: Park Bo-young; Park Hyung-sik; Ji Soo
- Theme music composer: Moon Sung-nam
- Country of origin: South Korea
- Original language: Korean
- No. of episodes: 16 + 1 special

Production
- Executive producers: Song Won-sub; Park In-sun
- Producers: Park Jun-seo; Lee Jin-suk; Park Ji-an; Ra Sung-shik
- Cinematography: Moon Se-hong; Lee Min-jin
- Editor: Oh Dong-hee
- Running time: 60–70 minutes
- Production companies: Drama House; JS Pictures

Original release
- Network: JTBC
- Release: February 24 – April 15, 2017

Related
- Strong Girl Nam-soon

Strong Girl Bong-soon (Korean: 힘쎈여자 도봉순) is a 2017 South Korean television series starring Park Bo-young in the title role as a woman with superhuman strength, with Park Hyung-sik and Ji Soo. It aired on JTBC from February 24 to April 15, 2017.

The series received audience acclaim, with its final episode recording 8.96% in nationwide ratings, becoming the "highest viewership rating among JTBC dramas" at that point of time.

== Synopsis ==
Do Bong-soon (Park Bo-young) was born with superhuman strength. Her strength is hereditary and passed along only to the women in her family. She dreams of creating a video game with herself as the main character. She desperately wants to become a delicate and elegant woman, which is the ideal type of her crush, In Guk-doo (Ji Soo), a police officer who is also her childhood friend. Thanks to her strength, she gets a job as a bodyguard to rich heir Ahn Min-hyuk (Park Hyung-sik), the CEO of a gaming company, Ainsoft. A series of kidnapping cases happen in Dobong-dong, the district Bong-soon lives in, and she is determined to catch the culprit who targeted her best friend. With help and training from Min-hyuk, she manages to control her strength to use it for good causes. Min-hyuk and Bong-soon find their relationship growing into something more. Their relationship at work and in pursuit of the kidnapper creates comical and dangerous situations, which bring them closer.

== Cast ==
=== Main ===
- Park Bo-young as Do Bong-soon
  - Shin Bi as young Do Bong-soon

A young woman born with superhuman strength who tries not to use her powers but does not hesitate to use them for good when needed. She has had a crush on Guk-doo for a long time but eventually falls for Min-hyuk. She will lose her powers if she harms an innocent with them.

- Park Hyung-sik as Ahn Min-hyuk
  - Choi Seung-hoon as young Ahn Min-hyuk

A chaebol heir and CEO of a video game company who hides his pain underneath his cheeky demeanour. He knows Bong-soon even before the "Bus incident" but is not aware of it until much later.

- Ji Soo as In Guk-doo
  - Choi Min-young as young In Guk-doo

An idealistic rookie detective who is passionate about justice. Known for being crazy and extremely aggressive, he is continuously transferred from one department to another. He was initially unaware of Bong-soon's powers.

=== Supporting ===
==== People around Do Bong-soon ====
- Ahn Woo-yeon as Do Bong-ki
  - Lee Hyo-dan as young Do Bong-ki

Bong-soon's twin brother. He cares for Bong-soon.

- Shim Hye-jin as Hwang Jin-yi

Bong-soon's mother. She corners Bong-soon and always prioritises Bong-ki. She often assaults her husband.

- Yoo Jae-myung as Do Chil-goo

Bong-soon's father. He is naive and cares deeply for both his children. Despite being beaten by his wife frequently, he tries to maintain a positive attitude.

- Park Bo-mi as Na Kyung-shim

Bong-soon's best friend from Busan. She was Kim Jang-hyun's fourth kidnapping victim. She knows about Bong-soon's powers.

- Baek Soo-ryun as Lady Soon-shim

Bong-soon's maternal grandmother.

- Kim Mi-hee as Myung-soo's mother
- Kim Soo-yeon as Jae-soon's mother

==== People around Ahn Min-hyuk ====
- Jeon Seok-ho as Secretary Gong

Min-hyuk's secretary.

- Han Jung-kook as Ahn Chul-do

Min-hyuk's father, Chairman of Ohsung Group.

- Kim Sung-bum as Ahn Dong-ha

Min-hyuk's half-brother.

- Shim Hoon-gi as Ahn Dong-suk

Min-hyuk's formerly trusted half-brother.

- Lee Se-wook as Ahn Kyung-hwan

Min-hyuk's half-brother.

==== People around In Guk-doo ====
- Seol In-ah as Jo Hee-ji

Guk-doo's girlfriend.

- Yoon Ye-hee as Jung Mi-hwa

Guk-doo's mother.

==== People at Baek Tak Party ====
- Im Won-hee as Baek Soo-tak
- Kim Min-kyo as Ahgari
- Kim Won-hae as Kim Kwang-bok
- Kim Ki-moo as Hwang Hyun-dong
- Lee Ho-cheol

==== Do Bong Police Station Criminal Team 3 ====
- Choi Moo-in as Team Leader Yook
- Oh Soon-tae as Bulgom (Brown Bear)
- Joo Ho as Neokboi (Knock Boy)
- Choi Hyung as Heollaengyi (Hell Angel)
- Kim Won-suk as Dotbogi (Magnifying Glass)

==== Ainsoft Employee ====
- Kim Won-hae as Oh Dol-ppyeo

Head of Development Planning Team; doppelgänger of Kim Kwang-bok.

=== Extended ===
- Jang Mi-kwan as Kim Jang-hyun

A criminal. He was the true perpetrator of the serial kidnapping of young women, and throughout the series, especially the latter part, he was in an enmity with Bong-soon and tried ways to get rid of her. Eventually, Kim Jang-hyun was arrested and sentenced to life imprisonment for murder and kidnapping.

- Son Hyo-eun as Jung Hyang-sook

A murder victim. She was, in fact, Kim Jang-hyun's first intended kidnapping victim but was murdered by him due to her fierce attempts at self-defence.

- Choi Hyun-seo as Kim Ji-won

High-school teacher; the first kidnapped victim.

- Choi Young-shin as Lee Joo-young

Dance instructor; the second kidnapped victim.

- Min Ji-hyun as Pharmacist

The third kidnapped victim.

- Kim Hyun-mok as Bullied student
- Kim Young-choon as Il Jin

A high school student and the leader of Bong-soon's lackeys.

- Yoo In-soo as Kang Goo

One of Bong-soon's lackeys.

- Choi Won-myeong as Jang Kyung-tae
- Hong Ye-ri as Ho Soon-yi

Do Bong Walnut shop employee.

- Kim Tae-soo as Oh Hyun-joong

The contract killer.

- Lee Ho-chul as Team Leader Jo

Oh Hyun-joong's associate.

- Hapkie as Member of Baek Tak Party
- Kim Won-jun as Subway Molester
- Lee Jung-kwi as a High school boy bullied by Il Jin's gang
- Jun Byung-chul as Lee Woo-jin

=== Special appearances ===
- Kang Ji-young as JTVC announcer (Ep. 2, 8, 10 & 13)
- Lee Cheol-min as Fortuneteller (Ep. 4 & 7)
- Kim Won-hyo
- Song Won-geun as Song Won-geun, Theatre actor (Ep. 7 & 8)
- Yoon Sang-hyun as Charles Go (Ep. 8)
- Lee Soo-ji as Voice Phishing specialist
- Jung Chan-min as Voice Phishing specialist
- Jang Sung-kyu as JTVC announcer
- Kwon Hyuk-soo as fake Indian Monk Nizamuddin / Jo Dal-bong (Ep. 12–14)
- Lee Sang as the Ainsoft Receptionist (Ep. 14)
- Clara Lee as Lee Bong-soon, Dental Hygienist (Ep. 16)

== Production ==
The drama was written by Baek Mi-kyung, who previously wrote Beloved Eun-dong and directed by Lee Hyung-min of Ms. Temper and Nam Jung-gi. Filming started in October 2016 and finished on April 11, 2017.

The drama served as a reunion between Park Hyung-sik and Yoo Jae-myung, who previously worked together in the KBS2 drama Hwarang: The Poet Warrior Youth, as well as Kim Won-hae.

== Original soundtrack ==
Strong Girl Bong-soon OST Album

Soundtrack album
- Recorded: 2017
- Genre: Soundtrack
- Languages: Korean, English
- Labels: JTBC Content Hub, Warner Music Korea
- Producer: Moon Sung-nam

No.	Title	Artist	Length
1.	"You're My Garden" (그대란 정원)	Jung Eun-ji (Apink)	04:03
2.	"You're My Garden" (그대란 정원 (Inst.))		04:03
3.	"Heartbeat"	Suran	03:52
4.	"Heartbeat" (Inst.)		03:51
5.	"How Would It Be" (어떨까)	Standing Egg	03:49
6.	"How Would It Be" (어떨까 (Inst.))		03:49
7.	"Pit-A-Pat" (두근두근)	Kim Chung-ha	03:30
8.	"Pit-A-Pat" (두근두근 (Inst.))		03:28
9.	"Double Trouble Couple"	Mamamoo	03:30
10.	"Double Trouble Couple" (Inst.)		03:30
11.	"I Fall In Love" (사랑에 빠진 걸까요)	Vromance feat. Obroject	03:20
12.	"I Fall In Love" (사랑에 빠진 걸까요 (Inst.))		03:20
13.	"Super Power Girl"	Every Single Day	03:55
14.	"Super Power Girl" (Inst.)		03:55
15.	"Because of You" (그 사람이 너라서)	Park Hyung-sik	03:53
16.	"Because of You" (그 사람이 너라서 (Inst.))		03:53
Total length:			59:41

=== Charted songs ===
Chart performance

Title	Year	Peak chart positions	Sales	Remarks
Title	Year	KOR	Sales	Remarks
"How Would It Be" (Standing Egg)	2017	93	KOR: 18,545	Part 3
"Double Trouble Couple" (Mamamoo)	2017	46	KOR: 60,728	Part 5
"I Fall in Love" (Vromance feat. Obroject)	2017	99	KOR: 19,304	Part 6
"Because of You" (Park Hyung-sik)	2017	85	KOR: 22,038+	Part 8

== Ratings ==
Average TV viewership ratings
Ep.	Original broadcast date	Title	Average audience share		
Ep.	Original broadcast date	Title	Nielsen Korea		TNmS
Ep.	Original broadcast date	Title	Nationwide	Seoul	Nationwide
1	February 24, 2017	Ridiculous Punks (기막힌 녀석들)	3.829%	4.044%	3.9%
2	February 25, 2017	Culprit's Thought (범인의 마음)	5.758%	6.041%	6.1%
3	March 3, 2017	That Person's Secret (그놈의 비밀)	6.081%	7.003%	5.5%
4	March 4, 2017	Her True Identity (그녀의 정체)	8.301%	8.669%	8.3%
5	March 10, 2017	Seems As If They're Friends, and Yet Not (친구인 듯 친구 아닌)	7.113%	8.025%	6.7%
6	March 11, 2017	Happy Together (해피투게더)	8.692%	8.632%	7.7%
7	March 17, 2017	Changes (변화)	6.834%	7.119%	7.1%
8	March 18, 2017	One Step Closer (한 걸음 더)	9.603%	10.261%	8.8%
9	March 24, 2017	Love Risking One's Life (목숨 건 사랑)	7.423%	8.019%	8.8%
10	March 25, 2017	Find A Hidden Heart (숨은 마음 찾기)	9.668%	9.286%	9.8%
11	March 31, 2017	Timing (타이밍)	7.772%	8.572%	7.7%
12	April 1, 2017	Help Me (헬프 미)	8.477%	8.352%	9.1%
13	April 7, 2017	Nevertheless (그럼에도 불구하고)	7.448%	8.036%	8.9%
14	April 8, 2017	A Prelude to the Battle (배틀의 서막)	8.597%	9.251%	9.9%
15	April 14, 2017	Level Up (레벨 업)	7.834%	8.773%	7.9%
16	April 15, 2017	Final (파이널)	8.957%	9.625%	9.8%
Average			7.649%	8.107%	7.9%
Special	April 17, 2017		0.8%	N/A	0.6%
In the table above, the blue numbers represent the lowest ratings and the red numbers represent the highest ratings.; N/A denotes that the rating is not known.; This series aired on a cable channel/pay TV which normally has a relatively smaller audience compared to free-to-air TV/public broadcasters (KBS, SBS, MBC and EBS).

== Awards and nominations ==
Year	Award	Category	Recipient	Result	Ref.
2017	53rd Baeksang Arts Awards	Best Actress	Park Bo-young	Nominated	
2017	53rd Baeksang Arts Awards	Best New Actor	Ji Soo	Nominated	
2017	12th Seoul International Drama Awards	Best Mini-series	Strong Girl Bong-soon	Nominated	
2017	12th Seoul International Drama Awards	Best Actress	Park Bo-young	Nominated	
2017	12th Seoul International Drama Awards	Outstanding Korean Actress	Park Bo-young	Won	
2017	1st The Seoul Awards	Best Actress	Park Bo-young	Won	
2017	1st The Seoul Awards	Popularity award	Park Hyung-sik	Won	

== Adaptation and spin-off ==
=== Aborted American adaptation ===
On November 9, 2018, it was announced that an adaptation of the series was in development at The CW from CBS Television Studios and writer Melissa Scrivner-Love, with Ronda Rousey and Ben Silverman also set to executive produce. The project, titled Strong Girl, would have followed "a former war photographer named Rayna who discovers she is indestructible and potentially the strongest woman in the world. Ghosted by [her Special Operations fiancé] when she reveals her newfound power to him, Rayna is hired as a bodyguard by a billionaire named Oliver, who sees her true potential." On February 8, 2019, it was revealed that the script was not picked up to pilot.

=== Malaysian adaptation ===
In February 2024 it was reported that an adaptation of the series would be made in Malaysia, with no further news on which broadcasters nor the release date.

=== Spin-off ===
The spin-off of the series titled Strong Girl Nam-soon, starring Lee Yoo-mi, Kim Jung-eun, Kim Hae-sook, Ong Seong-wu and Byeon Woo-seok, premiered on JTBC on October 7, 2023. Park Hyung-sik and Park Bo-young make a special appearance in Strong Girl Nam-soon as Min-hyuk and Bong-soon.
