= Daily Dose of Sunshine =

2023 South Korean television series

- Promotional poster
- Hangul: 정신병동에도 아침이 와요
- Lit.: Morning Comes to Psychiatric Wards
- RR: Jeongsinbyeongdongedo achimi wayo
- MR: Chŏngsinbyŏngdongedo ach'imi wayo
- Genre: Medical drama; Comedy
- Based on: Morning Comes to Psychiatric Wards by Lee Ra-ha
- Written by: Lee Nam-gyu; Oh Bo-hyun; Kim Da-hee
- Directed by: Lee Jae-kyoo; Kim Nam-su
- Starring: Park Bo-young; Yeon Woo-jin; Jang Dong-yoon; Lee Jung-eun
- Music by: Mowg; Lee Eun-ju
- Country of origin: South Korea
- Original language: Korean
- No. of episodes: 12

Production
- Executive producers: Park Sun-bae; Kim Tae-won
- Producer: Park Cheol-su
- Editor: Shin Min-kyung
- Running time: 52–72 minutes
- Production companies: Film Monster; Kim Jong-hak Production

Original release
- Network: Netflix
- Release: November 3, 2023

Daily Dose of Sunshine (Korean: 정신병동에도 아침이 와요) is a South Korean television series directed by Lee Jae-kyoo, and starring Park Bo-young, Yeon Woo-jin, Jang Dong-yoon and Lee Jung-eun. It is based on the Kakao webtoon of the same Korean title by Lee Ra-ha, a former nurse, which highlights the author's real-life experiences. It was released on Netflix on November 3, 2023.

== Synopsis ==
The series centers on Jung Da-eun, a skilled nurse in the Department of Psychiatry at Myungshin University Hospital, and her interactions with the patients under her care.

== Cast ==
=== Main ===
- Park Bo-young as Jung Da-eun: a third-year nurse who gets transferred from Internal Medicine to the Psychiatric Department.
- Yeon Woo-jin as Dong Go-yun: a proctologist with an erratic personality.
- Jang Dong-yoon as Song Yu-chan: Da-eun's best friend who always quarrels with her.
- Lee Jung-eun as Song Hyo-shin: the chief nurse of the Psychiatric Department.

=== Supporting ===
==== Psychiatric Department ====
- Park Ji-yeon as Hong Jeong-ran: Da-eun's college classmate and a nurse at the Psychiatric Department.
- Jeon Bae-soo as Yoon Man-cheon: a nurse at the Psychiatric Department.
- Lee E-dam as Min Deul-re: a nurse at the Psychiatric Department.
- Lee Sang-hee as Park Soo-yeon: a nurse at the Psychiatric Department.
- Yoo In-soo as Ji Seung-jae: an intern student who has panic disorder.
- Chang Ryul as Hwang Yeo-hwan: Da-eun and Yu-chan's friend who is a psychiatrist at the Psychiatric Department.
- Kim Jong-tae as Im Hyeok-soo: a psychiatrist at the Psychiatric Department.
- Gong Sung-ha as Cha Min-seo: a psychiatrist at the Psychiatric Department.
- Im Jae-hyuk as Kong Cheol-woo: a psychiatrist at the Psychiatric Department.

==== Patients ====
- Jung Woon-sun as Oh Ri-na: Da-eun's first patient who has bipolar disorder.
- Jo Dal-hwan as Kim Sung-sik: Da-eun's patient who has an anxiety disorder.
- Kim Dae-gun as Choi Joon-gi: a patient who loses his child and wife and goes through difficult times.
- Roh Jae-won as Kim Seo-wan: Da-eun's patient who has delusions and believes he is in a video game called Lost Valhalla.
- Kim Yeo-jin as Kwon Ju-yeong
- Kwon Han-sol as Jung Ha-ram
- Kim Joo-ah as Park Byeong-hui

==== Others ====
- Park Sung-yeon as an internal medicine head nurse
- Joo In-young as Nurse Lee
- Hwang Young-hee as Da-eun's mother
- Cha Mi-kyung as Ri-na's mother
- Park Han-sol as Na-ra
- Park Jung-yeon as Hye-won
- Oh Min-ae as Seo-wan's mother
- Gong Min-jeung as Heo Ji-an: Da-eun's psychiatrist at Hayan Hospital.
- Hwang Ja-neung

== Reception ==
=== Critical response ===
On the review aggregator website Rotten Tomatoes, 100% of 6 critics' reviews are positive, with an average rating of 7.9/10.

=== Accolades ===
==== Awards and nominations ====
Name of the award ceremony, year presented, category, nominee of the award, and the result of the nomination
Award ceremony	Year	Category	Nominee	Result	Ref.
Asia Contents Awards & Global OTT Awards	2024	Best Creative	Daily Dose of Sunshine	Nominated	
Asia Contents Awards & Global OTT Awards	2024	Best Lead Actress	Park Bo-young	Nominated	
Baeksang Arts Awards	2024	Best Drama	Daily Dose of Sunshine	Nominated	
Baeksang Arts Awards	2024	Best New Actress	Lee Yi-dam	Nominated	
Baeksang Arts Awards	2024	Best Screenplay	Lee Nam-gyu, Oh Bo-hyun, Kim Da-hee	Nominated	
Bechdel Day	2024	Bechdel Choice 10	Daily Dose of Sunshine	Included	
Blue Dragon Series Awards	2024	Best Drama	Daily Dose of Sunshine	Won	
Blue Dragon Series Awards	2024	Best Actress	Park Bo-young	Won	
Blue Dragon Series Awards	2024	Best New Actor	Roh Jae-won	Nominated	
Busan OTT Series Awards 2024	2024	Medical Drama Special Award	Daily Dose of Sunshine	Won	
Cine21 Awards	2023	Series Category – Actress of the Year	Park Bo-young	Won	
International Emmy Awards	2024	Best Comedy	Daily Dose of Sunshine	Nominated	
Korea Broadcast Critics Awards	2024	Best Drama	Daily Dose of Sunshine	Won	
Seoul International Drama Awards	2024	Best Miniseries	Daily Dose of Sunshine	Nominated	

==== Listicle ====
Publisher	Year	Listicle	Placement	Ref.
Time	2023	The 10 Best Korean Dramas of 2023 on Netflix	Included	
Cine21	2023	Cine21 10 Best Korean Series	7th	
Rolling Stone	2023	10 Best South Korean TV Shows of 2023	3rd	
