= On Your Wedding Day =

2018 film by Lee Seok-geun

- Theatrical release poster
- Hangul: 너의 결혼식
- Lit.: Your Wedding
- RR: Neoui gyeolhonsik
- MR: Nŏŭi kyŏrhonsik
- Directed by: Lee Seok-geun
- Written by: Lee Seok-geun
- Produced by: Cha Sang-min
- Starring: Park Bo-young; Kim Young-kwang
- Cinematography: Lee Seong-jae
- Edited by: Lee Gang-hee
- Music by: Lee Jin-hee
- Production company: Filmmaker R&K
- Distributed by: Megabox Plus M; Opus Pictures
- Release date: August 22, 2018
- Running time: 110 minutes
- Country: South Korea
- Language: Korean
- Box office: US$21.1 million

On Your Wedding Day (Korean: 너의 결혼식) is a 2018 South Korean romantic comedy drama film that depicts the ten-year love and friendship of two people from teenage to adulthood. It was written and directed by Lee Seok-geun, and stars Park Bo-young and Kim Young-kwang. The film was released on August 22, 2018.

== Synopsis ==
A man receives a wedding invitation from his first love whom he met in high school. He reminisces all the trouble he went through to get together with her over the span of years beginning from youth, and how they had ups and downs in their life together. He finally goes to her wedding, and thanks her for being the shining star in his life and she thanks him for his support in need. He then walks away from her wedding function.

== Cast ==
=== Main ===
- Park Bo-young as Hwan Seung-hee, a girl who believes in true love at first sight
- Kim Young-kwang as Hwang Woo-yeon, Seung-hee's high school friend who falls in love with her at first sight and believes her to be his destiny

=== Supporting ===
- Kang Ki-young as Ok Geun-nam, Woo-yeon's friend
- Ko Kyu-pil as Goo Gong-ja, Woo-yeon's friend
- Jang Sung-bum as Choi Su-pyo, Woo-yeon's friend
- Cha Yup as Lee Taek-gi
- Seo Eun-soo as Park Min-kyung, Woo-yeon's ex-girlfriend
- Bae Hae-sun as Seung-hee's mother
- Jeon Bae-soo as Seung-hee's father
- Seo Yoon-ah as Su-pyo's wife
- Kim Sung-bum as Men's wear floor salesperson
- Yoo Hee-je as Taek-gi's crew
- Yoon Kyung-ho as Police station detective
- Baek Seung-chul as Chief of the police station
- Ahn Min-young as Guest house owner
- Jang Da-kyung as Photographer
- Han Chul-woo as Broadcasting producer

=== Cameo and special appearances ===
- Ahn Gil-kang as Woo-yeon's father
- So Hee-jung as Woo-yeon's mother
- Kim Hyun-sook as Ms. Min
- Im Hyung-joon as Mr. Bae
- Ha Jun as Seung-hee's groom
- Song Jae-rim as Lee Yoon-geun, Seung-hee's college senior and ex-boyfriend
- Shin So-yul as Kim So-jung, Seung-hee's college friend

== Production ==
- Pre-production started in 2015 and Kang Ha-neul was first offered the male lead role but ultimately declined.
- Lead actors Park Bo-young and Kim Young-kwang previously worked together in 2014 film Hot Young Bloods.
- Filming started on September 18, 2017, and completed on December 3.

== Release ==
The film was released in South Korea on August 22, 2018.

=== International release ===
- In USA on August 31, 2018
- In Vietnam on September 7, 2018, under the title Ngày Em Đẹp Nhất
- In Taiwan on September 14, 2018, under the title 婚禮的那一天
- In Philippines on September 19, 2018
- In Singapore on September 20, 2018
- In Indonesia on October 3, 2018
- In Hong Kong on November 1, 2018, under the title 再見‧我的初戀。
- In Japan on March 1, 2019, under the title 君の結婚式

=== Home media ===
The film was released in VOD service and digital download on September 27, 2018.

== Reception ==
=== Critical response ===
The Korea Herald described the film as a "funny, cute, lighthearted, and leaving you reminiscent of how it used to be when you were younger," and that it "created likeable characters... everyone in the movie perfectly fits his or her part."

William Schwartz from HanCinema commented that it is "an all-around excellent movie", and wrote that the film "chronicles their love story through 2005 and 2007 and 2012, before finally ending on a twist in 2018. It is a marathon. Any of the four different eras could be a fully-fledged movie on its own. They all have strong, engaging story-lines."

Local online entertainment media TV Report remarked that On Your Wedding Day is "emerging as the dark horse of theater's summer season." It reported that the film attracts audience in all ages—teenagers, 20s, 30s and middle-age—as it depicts a chronicle of real first love; showed realistic stories and various emotions in the changing environment; and sympathized with the memories of youth.

Online magazine Cosmopolitan Philippines commented that the film "served important life and love lessons without being too cheesy or unrealistic." The reviewer also praised the lead stars' acting performance and their on-screen chemistry.

=== Box office ===
The film premiered in South Korean cinemas on August 22, 2018. It attracted 99,318 moviegoers on its opening day and finished first place with US$794,127 gross, slightly higher than The Witness which finished in second place. It topped the box office during its first weekend with 30% revenue share, by attracting 694,237 moviegoers and grossing US$5.5 million. After topping the box office for six consecutive days, the film reached 1 million admissions on August 27, 2018. On August 31, it reached its break-even point with 1.5 million of admissions, as result of a strong ten days box office performance.

During its second weekend, it remained on the top of the box office by having 568,267 attendance with US$4.5 million gross, 18.6% lower gross compared to its debut weekend. On September 3, 2018, it surpassed 2 million cumulative admissions. After a two weeks strong performance, the film fell to second place during its third weekend with US$2.4 million gross from 321,342 attendance, tailing Searching. On September 12, 2018, the film reached 2.6 million views and became the most watched romance film in South Korea in 2018, surpassing Be with You.

As of September 24, 2018, the film attracted 2,812,135 total admission with US$21.1 million gross.

== Awards and nominations ==
Awards	Category	Recipient	Result	Ref.
55th Grand Bell Awards	Best New Director	Lee Seok-geun	Nominated	
2nd The Seoul Awards	Best Actress	Park Bo-young	Nominated	
2nd The Seoul Awards	Best New Actor	Kim Young-kwang	Nominated	
39th Blue Dragon Film Awards	Best Actress	Park Bo-young	Nominated	
39th Blue Dragon Film Awards	Best New Actor	Kim Young-kwang	Nominated	
39th Blue Dragon Film Awards	Popular Star Award	Kim Young-kwang	Won	
55th Baeksang Arts Awards	Best New Actor	Kim Young-kwang	Won	
55th Baeksang Arts Awards	Best New Director	Lee Seok-gun	Nominated	

== Remake and adaptation ==
A Chinese remake of the film titled My Love was released on April 30, 2021. It was directed and co-written by Han Tian, and stars Greg Hsu and Zhang Ruonan.

On June 23, 2021, it was announced that On Your Wedding Day will be adapted into a webtoon. It will be serialized on webtoon platforms such as Naver and Kakao.
