= Yi Suhyŏng =

Korean scholar-bureaucrat (1435–1528)

- Hangul: 이수형
- Hanja: 李秀亨
- RR: I Suhyeong
- MR: I Suhyŏng

Art name
- Hangul: 도촌, 공북헌
- Hanja: 桃村, 拱北軒
- RR: Dochon, Gongbukheon
- MR: Toch'on, Kongbukhŏn

Courtesy name
- Hangul: 영보
- Hanja: 英甫
- RR: Yeongbo
- MR: Yŏngbo

Yi Suhyŏng (Korean: 이수형; Hanja: 李秀亨; 1435–1528) was a Korean politician and Confucian scholar, writer, and poet of the Joseon period. His art names were Toch'on and Kongbukhŏn. It was after King Sejo of Joseon took possession of the throne by force and after the loss of his nephew, that he left politics and secluded himself away from society.

== Life ==
He studied at Kim Tam's school and later married one of Kim's daughters. In 1450, he was a successor of an ancestral government position at a young age of 17. His next political posts were sŏngyoryang (선교랑), chŏnsaeng sŏryŏng (전생서령) and pu sajik (부사직).

In 1455, Sejo of Joseon usurped the throne held by his nephew, Danjong of Joseon. Yi Suhyŏng responded in resentment, and left the government service. He retired to a hermitage in the mountains.

After the assassination of his nephew, Danjong in 1457, he mourned for him in 3 years. Missing his nephew, as he had since Danjong's death, he had cut himself completely from all human contact, for the next 70 years.

== Works ==
- Toch'on sŏnsaeng silgi (도촌선생실기; 桃村先生實紀)
- Kwaedan kamgwang nok (괴단감광록; 槐壇曠感錄)

== See also ==
- Sejo of Joseon
- Danjong of Joseon
- Kim Tam
