= Sejong the Great =

King of Joseon from 1418 to 1450

- Posthumous portrait, 1973

King of Joseon
- Reign: September 18, 1418 – April 8, 1450
- Predecessor: Taejong
- Successor: Munjong
- Regent: Crown Prince Hyang (1439–1450)

Crown Prince of Joseon
- Tenure: July 20, 1418 – September 18, 1418
- Predecessor: Crown Prince Che
- Successor: Crown Prince Hyang
- Born: May 15, 1397; Hanyang, Joseon
- Died: April 8, 1450 (aged 52); Hanyang, Joseon
- Burial: Yeongneung, Yeoju, South Korea
- Spouse: Queen Sohŏn (m. 1408; died 1446)
- Issue among others...: Munjong; Sejo; Anpyeong
- Dynasty: House of Yi
- Father: Taejong
- Mother: Queen Wŏn'gyŏng
- Religion: Korean Buddhism

Korean name
- Hangul: 이도
- Hanja: 李祹
- RR: I Do
- MR: I To

Monarch name
- Hangul: 세종
- Hanja: 世宗
- RR: Sejong
- MR: Sejong

Royal title
- Hangul: 충녕대군
- Hanja: 忠寧大君
- RR: Chungnyeong daegun
- MR: Ch'ungnyŏng taegun

Courtesy name
- Hangul: 원정
- Hanja: 元正
- RR: Wonjeong
- MR: Wŏnjŏng

Sejong (Korean: 세종; Hanja: 世宗; May 15, 1397 – April 8, 1450 (Note: Here, the birthday given in the Gregorian calendar. Most pre-1893 dates in this article use the Korean calendar; post-1893 dates will use the Gregorian calendar. Some pre-1893 dates have been converted to Gregorian because their anniversaries are of current interest. Korean calendar: 10th day, 4th month of 1397 – 17th day, 2nd month of 1450 Julian calendar: May 7, 1397 – March 30, 1450)), commonly known as Sejong the Great (세종대왕; 世宗大王), was the fourth monarch of the Koreanic state Joseon. He ruled from 1418 to his death in 1450. He is widely regarded as the greatest king in Korean history, and is particularly remembered for the creation of Hangul, the native alphabet of the Korean language.

Sejong was born the third son of the future King Taejong (r. 1400–1418). He was regarded as gifted, moreso than the troubled crown prince Grand Prince Yangnyŏng. In mid-1418, Yangnyŏng was deposed and Sejong made the crown prince. Months later, Taejong abdicated and Sejong was crowned king. Taejong served as king emeritus until his death in 1422.

Sejong's reign was marked by major developments in science, technology, medicine, agriculture, and the arts. Many such efforts Sejong not only oversaw, but actively participated in. In 1420, Sejong had the government research organization Hall of Worthies reestablished. It oversaw such projects as the creations of the first native Korean calendar Ch'ilchŏngsan, the 365-volume medical text Ŭibangyuch'wi, and the agricultural text Nongsa chiksŏl.

In 1419, Sejong launched the successful Ōei Invasion against the Japanese Tsushima Island. This was followed by decades of peace and trade between Korea and Japan. Sejong also expanded the northern borders of Korea to roughly its current extent by launching military campaigns against and assimilating the raiding Jurchens, although this region would remain problematic. He also maintained positive relations with Joseon's suzerain Ming while still asserting Korean autonomy. Sejong made significant tax and land reforms, which resulted in increases in agricultural production and a reduction in tax rates, without significant impact to tax income. He also led a massive expansion in the influence of Confucianism in Korea and decrease in the influence of Buddhism. Despite his anti-Buddhist policies, he was privately Buddhist and increasingly vocalized his faith, which put him at odds with the Confucianists of his court.

Sejong had recurring and worsening health issues for much of his life. Beginning in 1445, he had the crown prince, the future King Munjong (r. 1450–1452), handle the daily affairs of government. Sejong died at the age of 52 in 1450 and is buried in the tomb Yeongneung.

Sejong is regarded as an icon of Korean culture in South Korea, where he has received numerous tributes. Sejong City bears his name. In North Korean official texts, Sejong's cultural and scientific contributions are evaluated positively, while also emphasizing that the actual living conditions under his rule involved heightened feudal subjugation, heavier tax burdens, and rigid class stratification for the peasantry.

== Names and titles ==
"Sejong" is the name by which he is most widely known. It is a temple name: a posthumous title that was given to him on the 19th day, 3rd month of 1450. Historian Gari Ledyard roughly translates its meaning as "epochal ancestor". Sejong's birth name was Yi To (이도; 李祹). In the 2nd month of 1408, Yi To was granted the name "Ch'ungnyŏng" (충녕; 忠寧) and the title "Prince" (군; 君). In the 5th month of 1413, Ch'ungnyŏng was granted the title "Grand Prince" (대군; 大君). On the 27th day, 6th month of 1418, Ch'ungnyŏng was granted the courtesy name "Wŏnjŏng" (원정; 元正).

After his death, Ming granted him the title of Changhŏn (장헌; 莊憲; Pinyin: Zhuāngxiàn). His full posthumous title was Great King Changhŏn Yŏngmun Yemu Insŏng Myŏnghyo (장헌 영문 예무 인성 명효 대왕; 莊憲英文睿武仁聖明孝大王).

Sejong was reportedly popularly called the "Yao-Shun East of the Sea" (해동요순; 海東堯舜; Haedong Yosun). The name references the legendary wise Chinese sage kings Yao and Shun. "East of the Sea" refers to Korea.

== Early life ==
Yi To was born on the 10th day, 4th month of 1397 in Chunsubang, (Note: 준수방; 俊秀坊. The exact location of Chunsubang is not known with certainty; it is believed to be outside of the current west gate Yeongchumun of the palace Gyeongbokgung.) Hanyang (Seoul), Joseon as the third son of father Grand Prince Chŏngan and Princess Chŏngnyŏng. Yi To's father was the fifth son of the founding and reigning king of Joseon, Taejo (r. 1392–1398).

Yi To was born five years after the founding of Joseon. His father, Grand Prince Chŏngan, had played a major role in the dynasty's establishment. In 1398, Chŏngan became embroiled in a succession crisis. He launched the First Strife of the Princes, which resulted in the installment of one of his brothers as King Jeongjong (r. 1398–1400). After suppressing a coup in the Second Strife of the Princes, Jeongjong abdicated the throne in favor of Chŏngan, who became King Taejong (r. 1400–1418).

Very little is known of Yi To's early life; few records were made of him, as it had seemed unlikely that he would ascend to the throne until just before he did. One anecdote has it that the young Yi To read so much that his father became concerned for his health and took away his books; one book (the Kuso sugan) that was missed Yi To read several times over. Several historians have evaluated this anecdote as possibly fanciful, but Ledyard argued it was plausible given Yi To's lifelong academic interests. In 1413, Taejong told Yi To (who by then was called Ch'ungnyŏng): "you have nothing to do in particular, so you should just enjoy your life in peace". (Note: 너는 할 일이 없으니, 평안하게 즐기기나 할 뿐이다; 汝無所事, 安享而已) At this point, Ch'ungnyŏng was already considered to be bright and skilled at the arts, including calligraphy, the gayageum (traditional Korean string instrument), and painting. That year, he began to be tutored by scholar-official Yi Su.

=== Heir to the throne ===
By 1406, Taejong had decided that he wished to eventually abdicate the throne to a successor while he was still alive, to reduce the probability of a succession crisis upon his death. Taejong had twelve sons, the oldest of which was Grand Prince Yangnyŏng. Yangnyŏng was designated the successor.

A number of anecdotes indicate that Yangnyŏng was considered to have behavioral issues. Yangnyŏng disobeyed the king frequently, neglected studying, and womanized. Taejong strictly and sternly managed Yangnyŏng's education. Historian Kim Young Soo argued that this may have pushed Yangnyŏng away from studying. By contrast, various anecdotes in the Veritable Records of Taejong indicate that Ch'ungnyŏng was seen as intelligent and studious by the king and various members of the court. The king frequently praised Ch'ungnyŏng and compared him favorably to Yangnyŏng, to the latter's chagrin. On several occasions, Ch'ungnyŏng chastised the misbehavior of Yangnyŏng, which only fueled the latter's resentment, although on several occasions Yangnyŏng acknowledged his brother's better judgement. The two developed a bitter rivalry.

In early 1417, it emerged that Yangnyŏng had had an affair with a woman named Ŏri (어리; 於里), a concubine of scholar-official Kwak Sŏn (곽선; 郭璇). The incident enraged and embarrassed Taejong. Yangnyŏng angrily accused Ch'ungnyŏng of having informed their father of the affair.

In early 1418, the younger brother of Ch'ungnyŏng, Grand Prince Sŏngnyŏng, was deathly ill. Ch'ungnyŏng reportedly stayed by his brother's bed day and night, reading medical texts and helping with the treatment. Sŏngnyŏng died on the 4th day, 2nd month of that year. Afterwards, Taejong went to Kaesong and nominally left Yangnyŏng in charge of the capital in his absence. He quietly ordered that Yangnyŏng be functionally isolated and monitored; he wished to see if Yangnyŏng would change his ways. In his father's absence, Yangnyŏng brought Ŏri back into the palace, where she gave birth to their child. When Taejong learned of this, he wept and confided to several ministers that he had little faith in Yangnyŏng's ability to govern. Historian Yoon Jeong argues that, around this time, Taejong worked on building consensus among his cabinet to have Yangnyŏng removed from his position. Their relationship reached its lowest point in the 5th month of that year, after Yangnyŏng sent a letter to his father in which he defended his actions and questioned his father's judgment.

On the 3rd day, 6th month of 1418, Taejong and his ministers held a meeting on whether to depose Yangnyŏng. (Note: According to the Veritable Records of the Joseon Dynasty, it was the court that petitioned Taejong to hold this meeting. Historians have instead argued that Taejong was the driving force behind the meeting. Ledyard argued that Taejong held this meeting just months before his abdication in order to surprise potential opposers.) The topic was contentious as it required overriding the stable practice of primogeniture. Despite some opposition from the queen and several in the court, it was decided that Yangnyŏng would be demoted and exiled to Gwangju. It was also decided that they would select the new successor based on their merits. Taejong described his second son, Grand Prince Hyoryŏng, as weak and overly agreeable. He then nominated Ch'ungnyŏng, whom he praised as studious and wise. The court reportedly enthusiastically agreed with Taejong's nomination. There is an anecdote that these decisions weighed heavily on Taejong, and that he wept after making them. Yangnyŏng took the news of his deposal calmly and quickly became detached from politics. Kim argued that Yangnyŏng had likely anticipated this happening. He was eventually invited back to the capital by his brother and the two got along well.

== Early reign ==
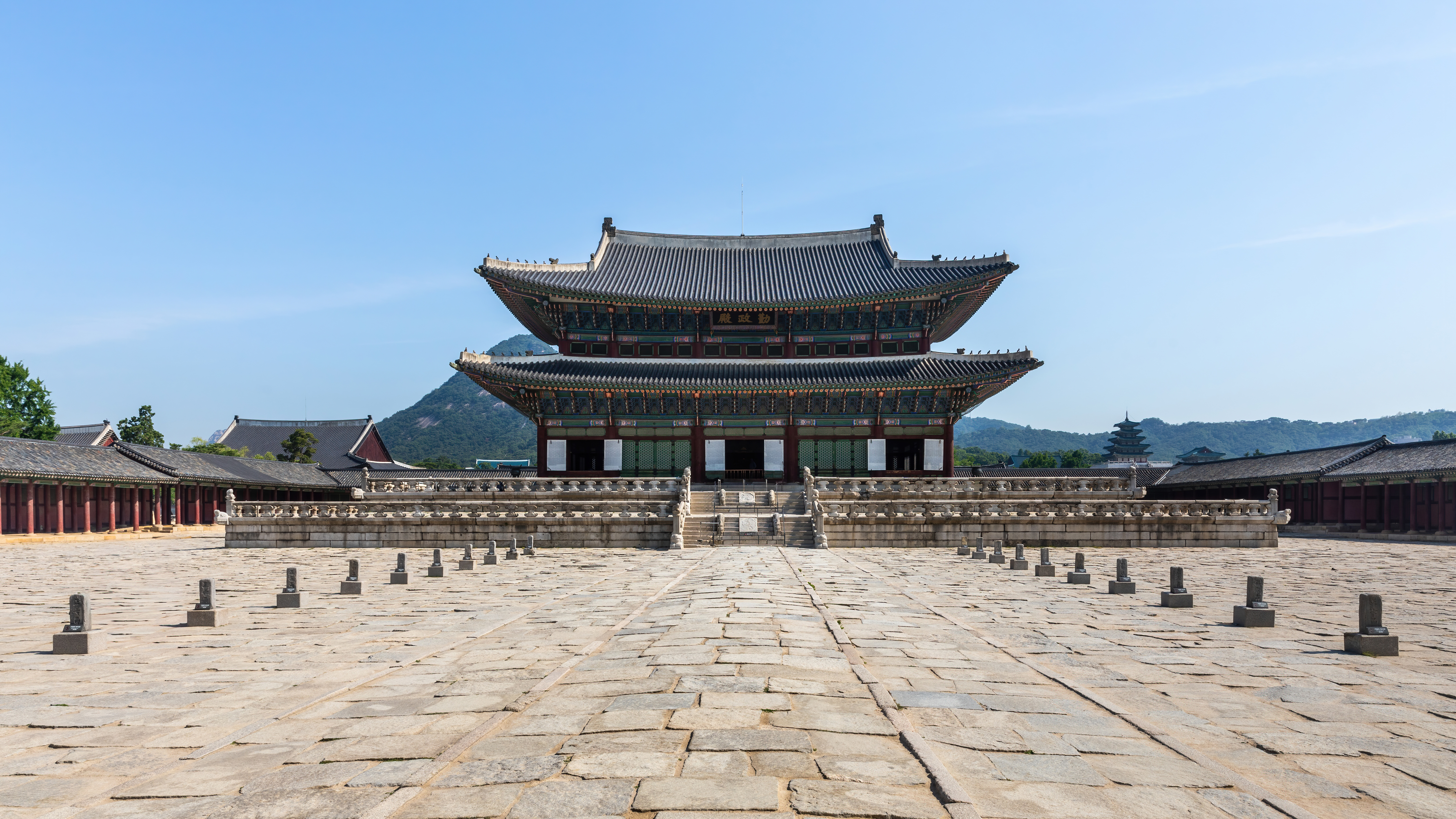
Geunjeongjeon, where Sejong was crowned.

On the 10th day, 8th month of 1418, Taejong abdicated and 21-year-old Ch'ungnyŏng (henceforth Sejong) ascended the throne at the hall Geunjeongjeon in the palace Gyeongbokgung. Taejong, as king emeritus, would continue to exert great influence over Sejong until the former's death on the 10th day, 5th month of 1422. Taejong had veto power on all decisions and maintained tight control over the military. On the 26th day, 10th month of 1421, Sejong designated his son Yi Hyang as crown prince.

A number of historians have argued that Sejong's successful reign was made possible by the stability created by Taejong's competent statecraft. Historian Djun Kil Kim argued that Sejong also benefitted from being surrounded by experienced military officials that had worked under his father. By the time that Sejong took the throne, bureaucratic institutions had been in place for around 15 years.

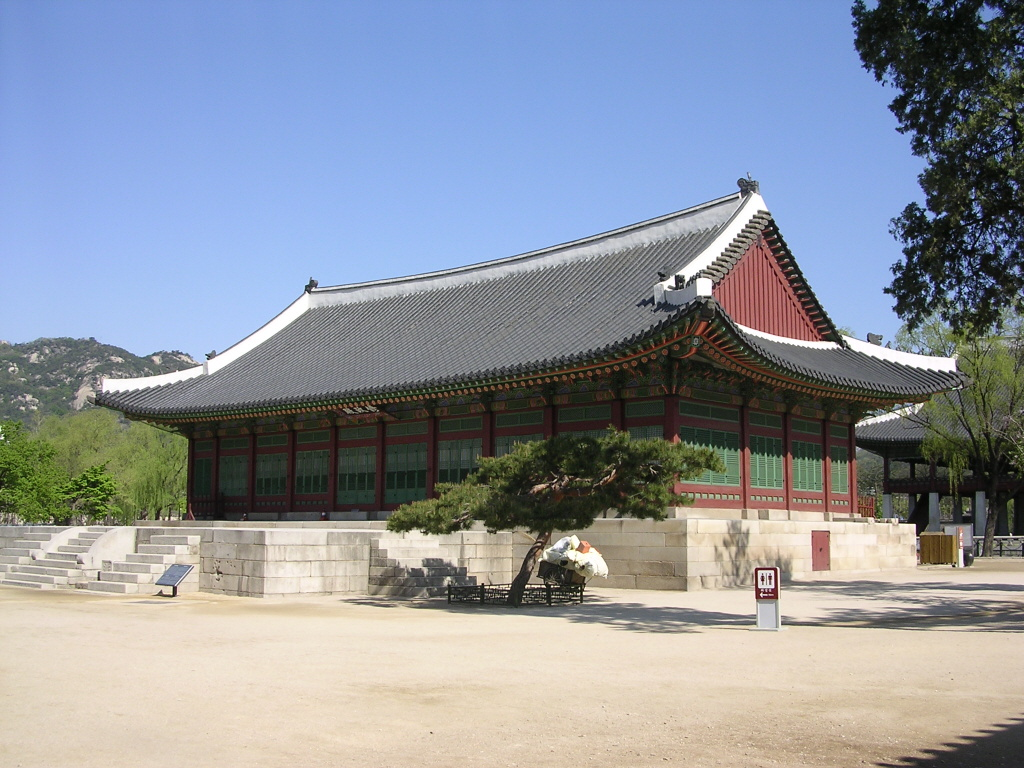
During Sejong's reign, the building Sujeongjeon in Gyeongbokgung hosted the Hall of Worthies

In 1420, Sejong designed and reestablished the Hall of Worthies. Modern historians have likened the institution to a think tank; it oversaw major cultural and intellectual pursuits, especially for issues of governance, as well as the education of the king and crown prince. In 1426, he ordered that the institution began a practice called saga toksŏ: allowing scholars to independently research without participating in government work; this has been likened to modern research grants.

In 1421, Sejong made Gyeongbokgung his primary palace. In 1426, he had many major gates and bridges of the palace named. By 1427, he officially moved out of the secondary palace Changdeokgung and into Gyeongbokgung, although he would continue to move between the two often. Sejong greatly renovated and expanded the palace. It was during Sejong's reign that Gyeongbokgung became fully-fledged and functional; it would remain in much the same state from his reign for around a hundred years afterwards.

== Science, mathematics, and technology ==
Sejong oversaw one of the most productive eras in Korean science. Several historians have described his reign as a "golden age" for the field.

=== Astronomy, meteorology, calendars, and timekeeping ===
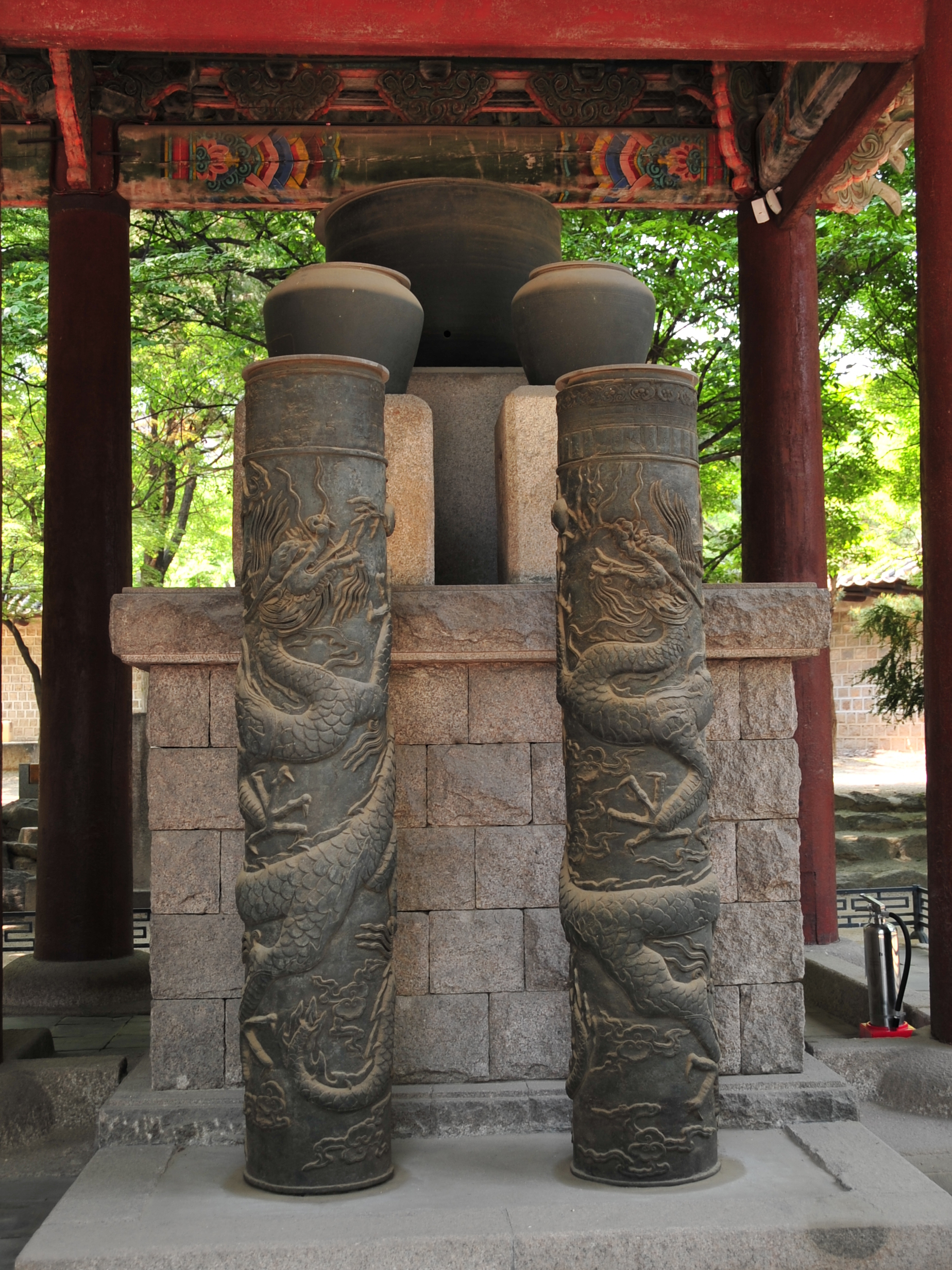
Part of the water clock Borugak Jagyeongnu. Built during Sejong's reign, when it rang the time would be relayed to the rest of the city.

Sejong oversaw significant research into astronomy. In 1432, a solar eclipse occurred two days later than predicted; this motivated Sejong to commission the research and development of astronomical instruments such as globes, planispheres, and sun dials. An armillary sphere was created in 1433. A water clock was designed by Chang Yŏngsil in 1434. In 1434 or 1438, the observatory Ganuidae was established in Gyeongbokgung by order of Sejong. In 1441, Prince Yi Hyang (the future King Munjong) led Korean scientists Yi Ch'ŏn and Chang Yŏngsil in inventing the ch'ŭgugi: a rain gauge, the likes of which would not be invented in Europe until Benedetto Castelli's invention in 1639. In 1442, ch'ŭgugi were distributed around Joseon. They fell out of use in the late 16th century, but were brought back in 1770 and saw continued use until the end of the Joseon period. The sup'yo (수표; 水標), a stream gauge, was invented in 1442.

Under Sejong, Korea began to develop its own indigenous calendar tradition for the first time. Prior to Sejong's reign, Korea was not able to accurately calculate dates or the positions of major heavenly bodies; it instead relied on calculations and calendars from China. These calculations were dependent on China's position on the Earth and were thus ill-suited for use in Korea. The use of Chinese calendars was in part political; it was seen as obligatory for Joseon to defer to the use of the calendar of its suzerain, Ming. In addition, Ming guarded the calculation methods for their calendar systems. In 1433, studies on calendar systems from China and elsewhere were launched. Sejong ordered that such studies be kept secret from Ming. In 1444, Sejong's court devised a new calendar: "Ch'ilchŏngsan". It used Seoul as its reference point. It allowed them to accurately predict lunar and solar eclipses in 1447. It was revised beginning in 1448, due to inconsistencies with the Chinese calendar. Historian Park Kwon Soo argued the inconsistencies were not mistakes, and were instead merely due to the differing locations of Beijing and Seoul. Nevertheless, Sinocentric Korean scholars expressed concerns about departing from Chinese calculations.

=== Medicine ===
Sejong also oversaw significant advances in Korean medicine. Historian of Korean medicine Kim Dujong argued that Sejong created "the foundation of medicine in Joseon". Sejong attempted to systematize both medical research and practice, with the latter grounded in the former. Historians Tae-jin Yi and Sang-Woon Jeon argue that innovations in medicine in Sejong's reign contributed to a multiplying of population growth between the 13th and 15th centuries.

Sejong took personal interest in medical education. In 1421, he had the medical school Ŭisŏ sŭptokkwan (의서습독관; 醫書習讀官) established. In 1427, he ordered that medical students be given support so that they can focus on their studies. In 1430, he ordered that the ŭigwa (medical examination) be reformed; major texts on traditional Chinese medicine and even veterinarian studies were added to the curriculum.

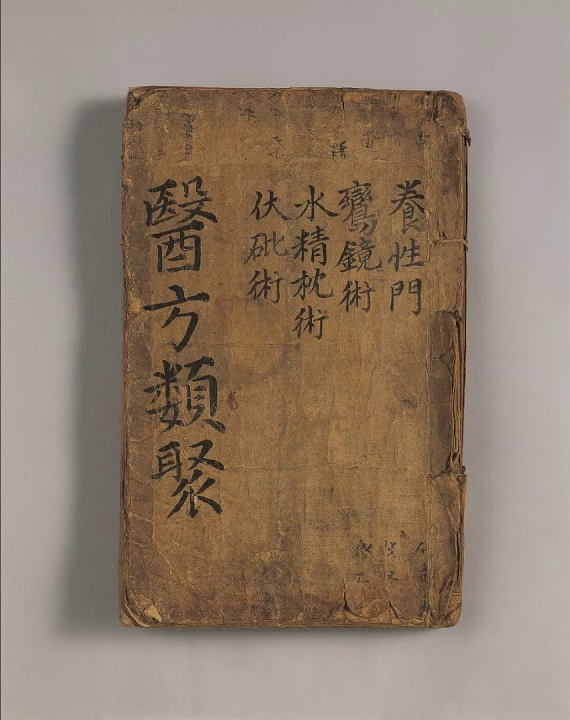
Cover of a volume of Ŭibangyuch'wi

In 1433, the 56-volume medical text Hyangyakchipsŏngbang was compiled. It became a major medical text; it was intended to serve as a comprehensive medical guide and was multiple times larger than its predecessor Hyangyak chesaeng chipsŏngbang. It described hundreds of symptoms and over 10,000 treatments. The work was based on research on traditional medicine throughout Korea, and included comparisons to Chinese medicine. It became a prized source of information in Ming as well. In 1445 or 1447, (Note: The 1445 first attestation to the text in the Veritable Records is unclear about when the Ŭibang yuchwi was completed. It both says that the text was commissioned and that it was completed on that date after three years of work. Historian Kim Seongsu argued that it was completed by 1447.) the 365-volume medical text Ŭibangyuch'wi was completed. Medical historian Kim Seongsu argues the text's scale dwarfs that of contemporary Chinese medical texts, and that it was possibly among the largest research projects in East Asia at the time. Kim also argued that this text may have also been applied to Sejong's treatment, as Sejong ordered that it be consulted months before he died.

In 1443, he ordered that the palace pharmacy Naeyakbang (내약방; 內藥房) be reorganized into the royal medical agency Naeŭiwŏn. Sejong also made efforts to lower the cost of medicine. He implemented price controls, established a fund that subsidized more expensive medicines, and attempted to substitute expensive foreign ingredients for domestic. In 1423 and 1430, he had Korean medical researchers visit China and work with Chinese researchers to determine what native Korean ingredients could serve as adequate substitutes for Chinese ingredients. This research resulted in the creation of the 1431 medical text Hyangyak ch'aech'wi wŏllyŏng (향약채취월령; 鄕藥採取月令).

=== Movable type ===
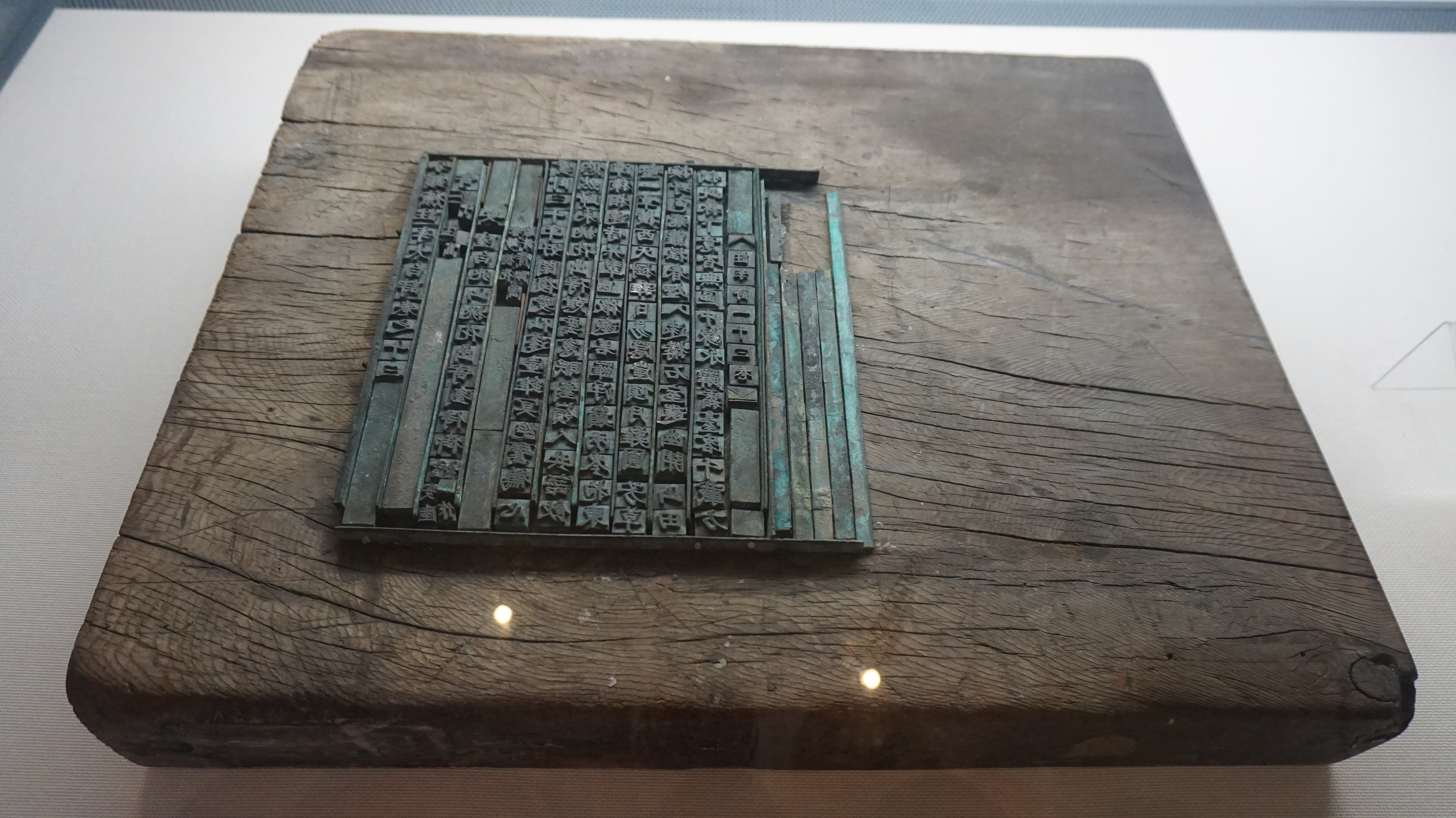
Kabin types set on a plate

Sejong's reign was a high point in innovations in Korean movable type technology. In 1420, Sejong ordered the casting of new kyŏngja types (경자자; 庚子字). The previously used kyemi types (계미자; 癸未字) required the use of adhesive beeswax to secure type to plate; this process was laborious and slow. The kyŏngja types instead relied on faster mechanical methods of typesetting, and allowed multiple times more pages to be printed per day. In 1434, Sejong's court cast a set of more than 200,000 kabin types (갑인자; 甲寅字) that were made of copper. The kabin types were as twice as efficient to use as kyŏngja types. Kabin type were manufactured five, six, or seven additional times in the future. After 1437, lead types began to be used. The use of such types was also regulated. Punishments were established for mistakes and poor worksmanship.

=== Agriculture ===
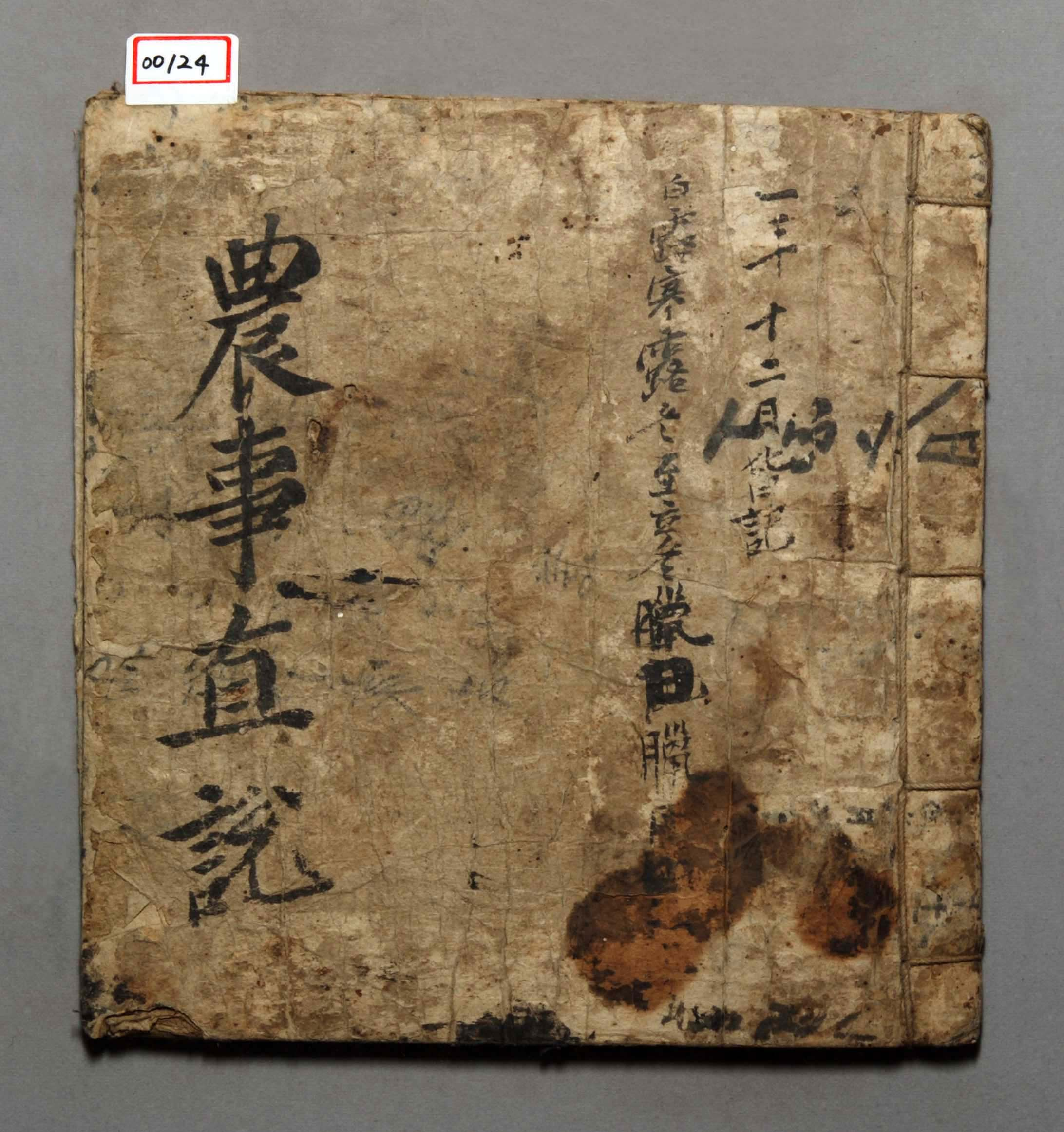
Cover of a copy of Nongsa chiksŏl

Sejong oversaw a notable increase in agricultural productivity. In 1429, the agricultural treatise Nongsa chiksŏl was completed under order of Sejong. The work was meant to be more directly suited to Korean agriculture than Chinese works. The text contains anecdotes from experienced farmers around Korea and remained a foundational work in Korean agriculture studies until the 17th century. It contributed to a multiplication of agricultural output by the end of the reign of King Seongjong (r. 1469–1494). Sejong took personal charge of an experiment on palace land on crop management in bad weather. Advancements in irrigation and the sericulture were also made. Innovations in other fields during Sejong's reign, including the development of rain gauges, more accurate calendars, and tax reform, also contributed to agriculture.

=== Mathematics ===
Sejong was a significant advocate for the study and use of mathematics in Joseon. At the time, mathematics was seen as a field for lower-level bureaucrats and not Confucian scholars, especially not rulers. Sejong went against this social norm by studying mathematics himself. Sejong said of mathematics:

It is said that mathematics is nothing more than a mechanical skill, but it is indispensable to the administration of the state. But for the participation of Yi Sunji, Kim Tam and others in the recent cadastral survey, it is questionable the land could have been measured properly. By all means devise measures to ensure the maximum development of mathematics throughout the land.

— Veritable Records of Sejong, 17th day, 11th month of 1443

In 1431, Sejong sent promising mathematicians to China for study. In 1433, a 100-volume treatise on mathematics was printed, and in 1438 five mathematics texts were added to curriculums of technical colleges; afterwards mathematics became around half their curriculum. Unlike under some other monarchs when mathematics was neglected, Sejong encouraged the use of mathematics in government; people skilled in math were employed to administer taxes, take the census, and manage currency and accounting.

=== Cartography ===
Sejong's administration also made advances in cartography. In 1424, Sejong ordered that a national geography be compiled. In 1432 or 1434, (Note: Jinwung Kim and James B. Lewis claim the maps were completed in 1432. Ledyard claims that the maps were completed in 1434 after surveys were completed in 1432.) a collection of maps of Korea called "Sinch'an p'alto chiriji" (신찬팔도지리지; 新撰八道地理志) was prepared based on records and surveying efforts. This work was eventually incorporated into a 1454 larger collection of maps called "Sejong sillok chiriji". (Note: The work so named because it was appended to the Veritable Records of Sejong (Sejong sillok).) These maps served as foundation and reference for later maps and works.

=== Weaponry ===
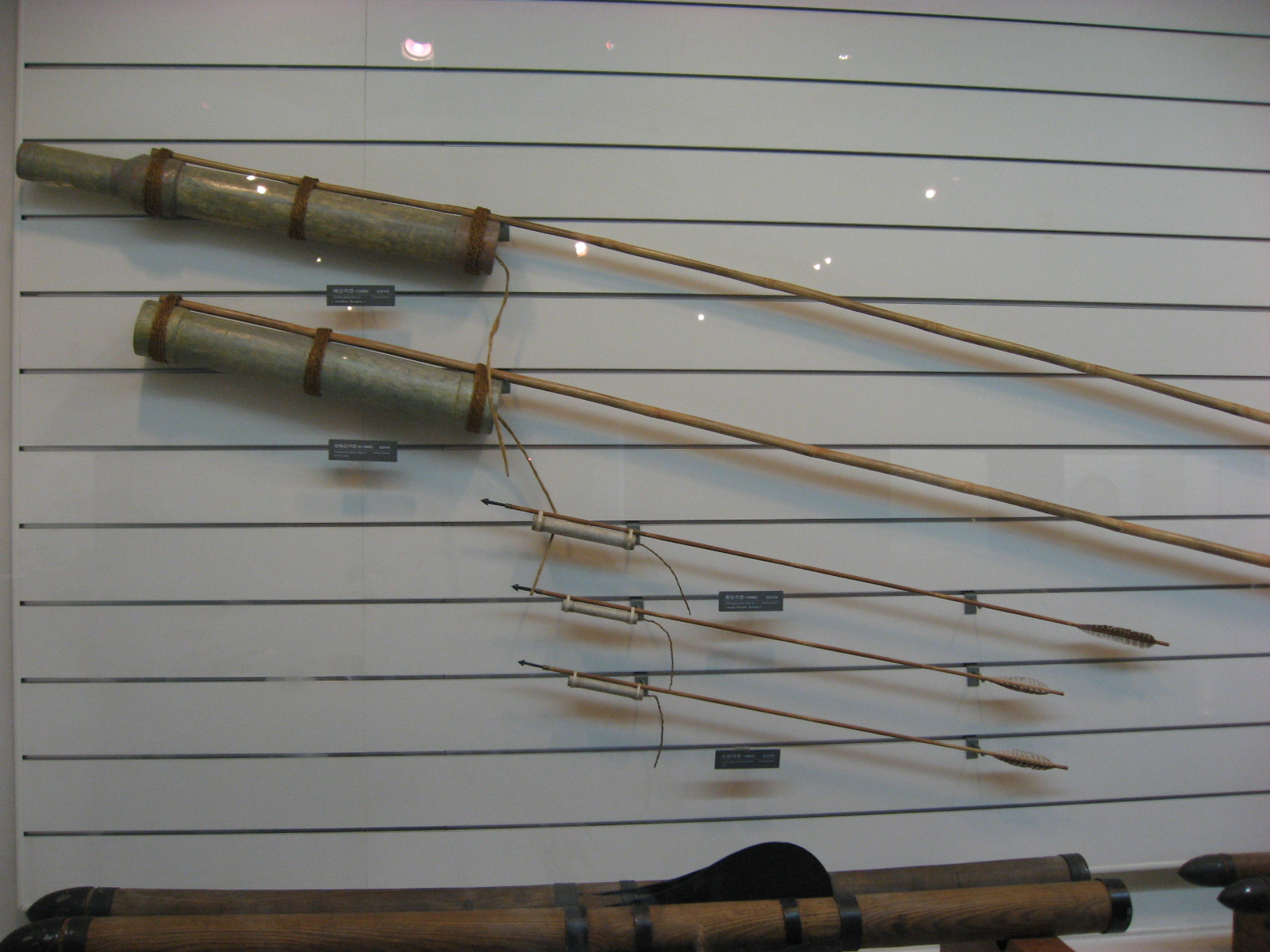
Sin'gijŏn of various sizes

Sejong commissioned the 1448 text Ch'ongt'ong tŭngnok (총통등록; 銃筒騰錄), which covered the manufacture and deployment of firearms. Sin'gijŏn (fire arrow rockets) were developed and first attested to in 1448, during Sejong's reign.

== Arts and culture ==
=== Music ===
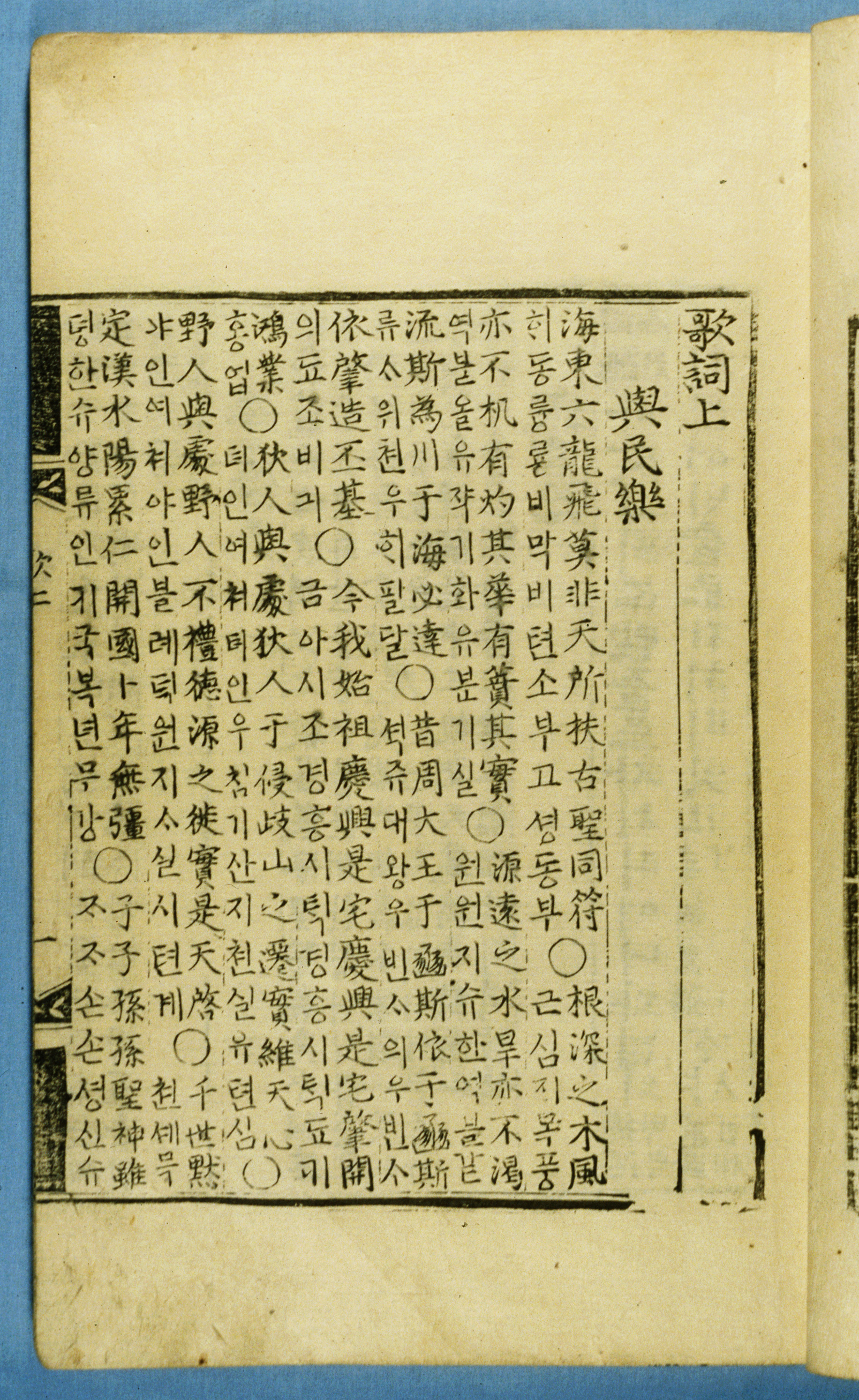
The lyrics of the song Yŏmillak, which was composed by Sejong himself

Sejong and his administration had a major influence in Korean court music. Sejong observed the aak genre music of the Korean court and felt that it had degenerated from ancient Chinese ideals. He and several scholars consulted Chinese texts and attempted to rejuvenate Korean practice.

From 1420 to 1425, Sejong had new court music produced. From 1423 to 1430, Sejong's chief musicologist Pak Yŏn oversaw the creations of hundreds of court music instruments. In 1430, after consulting ancient Chinese musicology texts, Sejong ordered that Pak Yŏn, Chŏng Inji, and others develop new music for Confucian rites. These efforts resulted in the recreations of several ancient Chinese instruments and a musical treatise that would be appended to the Veritable Records of Sejong. Reforms on court music continued, with new songs performed in 1433. Under Sejong's reign, the first mensural notation scheme in Asia was developed.

Beginning in 1433, focus shifted away from the emulation of Chinese practice to the development of native Korean practice. That year, he called for folk music from around Korea be gathered, although it is unknown if this project was completed.

Research conducted on Chinese musicology in Sejong's reign was eventually compiled into the 1493 text Akhak kwebŏm. This work has been evaluated as an extremely valuable source of information on traditional Sino-Korean music.

Sejong composed music himself. He composed Yŏmillak. In 1447, he created the pieces Pot'aep'yŏng (보태평; 保太平) and Chŏngdaeŏp (정대업; 定大業). These two pieces were adapted and continued to be performed until the end of the Joseon period. He also composed the music for the 1449 Buddhist text Sari yŏngŭnggi (사리영응기; 舍利靈應記).

=== Ceremonial rites ===
In the practice of ceremonial rites, Sejong attempted to preserve Korean tradition while also introducing ancient Chinese tradition. In 1444, Sejong ordered that research on the Five Rites be completed. Historian Martina Deuchler argued that it is clear Sejong supervised the compilation and gave his own input. Once completed in 1451, a copy of the work was appended to the Veritable Records of Sejong.

=== Art and calligraphy ===
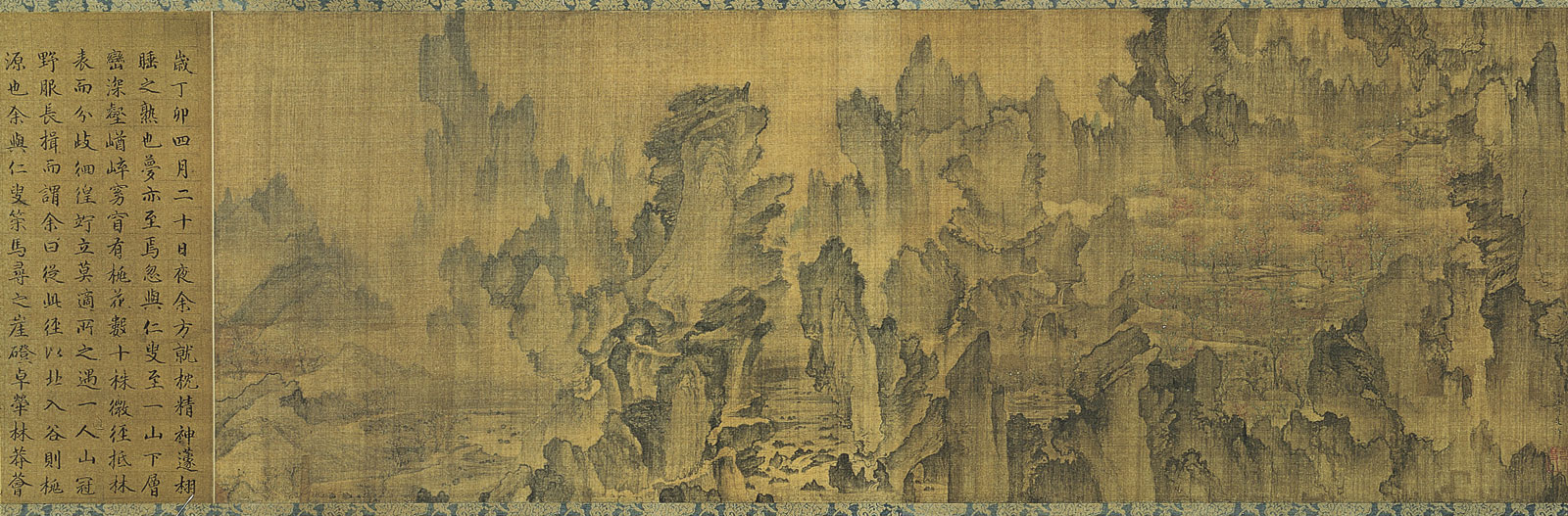
The landmark painting Mongyudowŏndo was produced during Sejong's reign

Sejong's reign is considered a high point in the history of Korean painting. Significant quantities of art were sponsored and produced during this period. Major artists of this period include literati painter Kang Hŭian, Ch'oe Kyŏng, Yi Sangjwa, and An Kyŏn. In 1447, An produced the landmark painting Mongyudowŏndo, which is said to be based on a dream of Sejong's third son Grand Prince Anp'yŏng. Calligraphy also flourished; that grand prince was himself a renowned calligrapher.

=== Literature ===
Sejong has been described as a "bibliophile". Anecdotes indicate that Sejong enjoyed reading as well as the collection and preservation of rare books. In 1442, he ordered governors in the southern provinces to gather information on his father's past exploits in suppressing Japanese pirates; these stories were developed into the work Yongbiŏch'ŏn'ga. That work then became the first major piece of literature in Hangul, after its Korean poems were completed around 1447.

== Domestic policy ==
Sejong attempted to govern primarily by Confucian principles. According to historian Christopher Lovins, Sejong's reign is widely viewed as the "full flowering of Confucianism in Korea".

Sejong believed that deliberation was important to good governance. Although Sejong was one of the most powerful Joseon monarchs, he and other Joseon monarchs were generally strongly checked by the high bureaucracy. Several historians have evaluated Sejong as open, in part intentionally, to vigorous debate and even criticism. He very frequently asked questions and advice of others. Historian James Palais argued that Sejong was not a despot; he said that while Sejong was "subjected to criticism and restraint that in other monarchies would be regarded as lèse-majesté", he was "able to control [his critics] by besting them at their own game rather than by resorting to force and punishment". Ledyard wrote of Sejong's policymaking, "in everything [Sejong] seems to have had an evenness of judgment, a fairness, common sense, a lack of prejudice".

Sejong maintained the policy of sinmun'go, wherein commoners with grievances were allowed to beat a drum at the magistrate's office and have their complaint heard.

Unlike his predecessors, Sejong regularly and even enthusiastically attended the Confucian lectures meant for the king. On one occasion, he insisted on attending the lectures even while mourning the death of his father, in order to set an example for future rulers on how important the lectures were. He attended it every day for nearly 22 of his 32 years as king. He assigned around 10 academicians of the Hall of Worthies to research, develop, and deliver the lectures. He also performed his own research and gave input on the curriculum. According to Ledyard's analysis, Sejong's academic interests did not distract from his administrative duties. Sejong opened the court daily at dawn, and after receiving ceremonial visits, went straight into state meetings.

Sejong had a significant impact on curricula for crown princes of Joseon. In 1421, the crown prince began attending the royal lectures with his father. In 1428, he had the Chonghak established. This institution was directly focused on the education of the royal family, whereas previously, their education was handled by a variety of institutions.

Sejong mostly maintained his father's policy of honoring the former royal House of Wang, which had ruled Goryeo. By Sejong's reign, the surviving members of that family were all female. Sejong allowed them to remain aristocrats and live freely. He ordered that the tombs of the former Goryeo monarchs be properly maintained. When several Wang women were involved in legal disputes, Sejong showed amnesty to them. Still, Sejong and his court viewed the women with some suspicion.

Sejong ordered the compilations or revisions of the Veritable Records of his three predecessors. Under his administration, key practices around the production of the Veritable Records began, including the practice of making four extra copies of the records for distribution around Korea. This practice would end up saving the Veritable Records for modern historical use, as most copies were destroyed by the Japanese in 1592, during the Imjin War.

=== Legal system ===
Historian Young Kyun Oh argued Sejong attempted to relatively strictly abide by the Great Ming Code, the Chinese legal code adopted as the basis of Joseon's laws in 1392. Oh evaluated Sejong's deviations from the code as reluctant and minor. Park evaluated Sejong as resistant to suggestions of punishing people for what he viewed as minor offenses.

Sejong actively participated in revising Joseon's supplementary legal code. In 1420 or 1422, Sejong ordered that the legal code Joseon had been using, the Kyŏngje yukchŏn, be revised. The first draft of the revised code was completed in 1426. Another revision, called the Sinsok yukchŏn (신속육전; 新續六典) was completed in 1428. It was revised again and published in 1433 as the Sinch'an kyŏngjesok yukchŏn (신찬경제속육전; 新撰經濟續六典). A revised version was published in 1435.

Sejong made policies that sought to improve living conditions of prisoners. He ordered that prisoners should be kept in clean prisons, fed regular meals, and not be put in conditions that are excessively cold or hot. He forbade imprisonment of people over 70 or under 15. He also had autopsy practices reformed in order to provide more accurate information in legal cases.

=== Taxation and economics ===
Sejong significantly reformed the tax system of Joseon. The taphŏm sonsilpŏp (답험손실법; 踏驗損實法) tax system that had been implemented under his father's reign inadvertently put excess strain on peasants, especially as tax officials abused the system for their own benefit. In 1421, Sejong ordered that peasants be allowed to report their own assessments of crop yields, in order to prevent tax officials from making false reports.

Work on designing a new tax system, which would eventually be called kongpŏp (공법; 貢法), began in 1427. In 1430, Sejong ordered that an extensive public opinion survey on tax policies be conducted across the social classes. Over 170,000 people were polled on; they voted on various issues and proposals, and reasons for voting against Sejong's proposals were thoroughly documented. The survey was completed that year. Afterwards, Sejong had his ministers debate the merits of each idea. The populace voted in favor of Sejong's ideas, but some of his ministers strongly rejected them. The topic was contentious and the debate lasted for 17 years. Sejong was apprehensive of making a sudden change to the tax system, in fear that he could ruin many lives. The new system was completed in 1444. It was to be gradually rolled out from localities to larger regions over the following decades. The land tax rate was lowered from 10% of the harvest to 5%. Historians have argued that this tax change improved the quality of life in the country without harming tax income, as confiscations of Buddhist temple land and increases in agricultural productivity helped offset the difference. The Hall of Worthies also formulated a variable tax rate that depended on land yields and rainfall conditions.

Sejong continued his father's work in reorganizing the Korean feudal system, in order to improve taxation and the state's ability to mobilize manpower. The organization of the hojŏk (family registration system) resulted in double the amount of adult males accounted for by the state than during his father's reign.

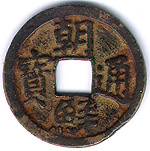
The Joseon Tongbo coin, first minted under Sejong

Sejong attempted to improve access to and use of currency, to limited success. In 1424, Sejong had the copper coin Joseon Tongbo minted, but this failed to supplant the predominant practice of bartering cloth and grain. Under Sejong, weights and measures were standardized to promote fairness in trading.

In 1445, Sejong consolidated the various records of sujoji (Note: 수조지; 收租地;) (land given to government officials in place of salaries), previously managed by various government offices, and placed them under the administration of the Ministry of Taxation (Hojo) to improve transparency in Joseon's fiscal policies.

=== Social issues ===
Sejong made multiple attempts to elevate marginalized social groups in Korea, to limited success. In 1423, Sejong attempted to elevate the severely marginalized ch'ŏnmin class by dubbing them paekchŏng and granting them farmland. Historians consider the attempt unsuccessful; the ch'ŏnmin continued to be marginalized and work in their hereditary marginalized sectors. The term paekchŏng began to apply to lower-class people in humble occupations. in 1432, Sejong ordered that the paekchŏng be allowed to enroll in county schools. Sejong once declared a national amnesty for those imprisoned for minor crimes. He prohibited slaveholders from arbitrarily punishing slaves.

In 1426, Sejong enacted a law that granted government serf (nobi) women 100 days of maternity leave after childbirth. In 1430, this was expanded to include one month before childbirth. In 1434, he also granted the husbands 30 days of paternity leave. In 1431, Sejong issued a set of laws that set the maximum size of houses for each social class.

Sejong argued that medical treatment should not be limited to the privileged, and that even criminals deserved treatment.

Around Sejong's reign, there was a prohibition on alcohol consumption for non-ceremonial purposes. Even though he was often sick, Sejong refused all medicinal liquors and took only salt water, in order to set a temperate example for the populace.

The issue of whether the state should encourage the playing of the sport polo was a controversial matter. Bureaucrats saw the sport as emblematic of the excesses of the Goryeo era. Spectators would become drunk and rowdy. Sejong argued that, while the sport had indeed been played excessively before, it should be kept for military examinations, as he admired the skill and agility required of its players. Ledyard argued Sejong's answer showed judiciousness and nuance. In 1425, a polo requirement was officially adopted in military examinations.

=== Samganghaengsilto ===
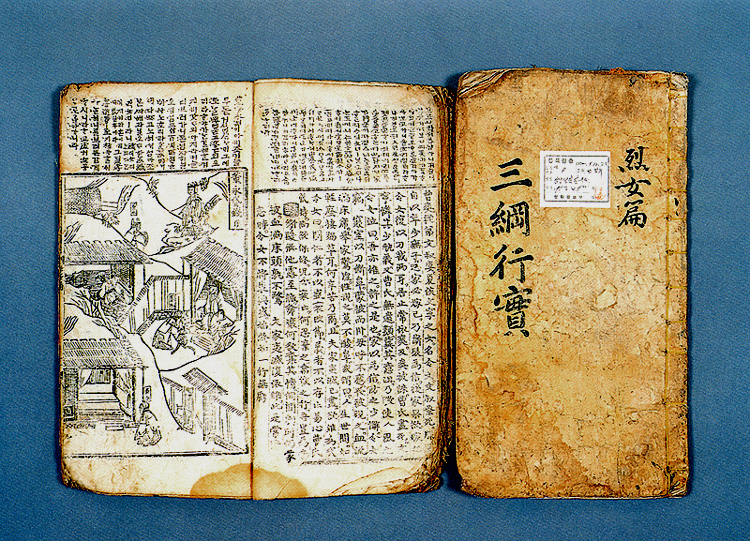
A copy of the Samganghaengsilto

In 1428, a legal case was brought to Sejong's attention. A man named Kim Hwa (김화; 金禾) murdered his father. This was seen as an egregious offense against a fundamental Confucian relationship. Minister Hŏ Cho proposed that Sejong apply the older and more draconian Tang Code, in order to exact a harsher punishment on Kim. Sejong refused this proposal, although the matter concerned him deeply. He brought the matter to the Hall of Worthies and explored how Confucian values could be better reinforced in the populace.

It was decided that a book providing examples of Confucian ethics could help educate the public. This resulted in the creation of the 1434 book Samganghaengsilto. The text was meant to improve the lives and morals of the general populace. It compiled Chinese and Korean stories and anecdotes that illustrated ethical Confucian behavior. It also included large pictures for the sake of the illiterate. The text was initially published in Hanja and later translated into Hangul. The Hangul translation efforts later sparked backlash from Hall of Worthies scholars, including Chŏng Ch'angson and Ch'oe Malli. Its Hangul translation was completed in 1481, decades after Sejong's death.

=== Buddhism ===
While Sejong and his predecessors privately practiced Buddhism, their policies restricted the power and influence of Buddhist institutions.

Joseon's predecessor Goryeo had been deeply Buddhist. But around the Goryeo–Joseon transition in the late 14th-century, anti-Buddhist sentiment had grown to new heights among Confucianists. Confucianists criticized the financial impact of the religion on the state (Buddhist temples were significant land and slaveholders and monks were seen as unproductive), as well as its philosophical foundations. Many of these Confucianists became significant members of the new Joseon bureaucracy. Many in Sejong's court were actively hostile to Buddhism. Yun Hoe, deputy director of the Hall of Worthies, wrote in 1424 to Sejong that "[w]e consider the harm of Buddhists to be prevalent still. Since the Han period the reverence for Buddha has been increasingly fervent, yet neither happiness nor profit has been gained... We think of all the heterodox teachings, Buddhism is the worst". On the other hand, a significant majority of people outside the government actively practiced Buddhism.

Unlike the Confucianists, Sejong believed that Buddhism and Confucianism could coexist, although he was critical of the economic impact that the religion was having on Joseon. Sejong's policies significantly restricted the influence of Buddhism on Joseon. Historian Pu Namchul argued that Sejong's restrictions were mainly focused on the worldly and secular impact of the religion, and were not restrictions on the religion itself. Grayson argued that by the end of Sejong's rule, Joseon became significantly more Confucianist. Sejong's restrictions on Buddhist land ownership caused the amount of productive farmland to rise from 1.2 million kyŏl (unit of measurement for area of farmland) in Taejong's reign to 1.72 million. On the 5th day, 4th month of 1424, Sejong commanded that the seven Buddhist schools be reduced to two: Seon and Kyo. In addition, each sect was only allowed to have 18 temples each; all other temples were forced to close. The temples were additionally restricted to having fewer than 4,000 monks, slaves, and workers combined. Metal Buddhist bells and statues were melted down for weapon making. Sejong also introduced a ban on monks from entering the capital. This ban would last until the late 19th century. On the other hand, Sejong pushed back on some anti-Buddhist policies, for example the abolition of the Buddhist lantern festival, prohibitions on monastic institutions, and prohibitions on Buddhist rituals.

Over time, Sejong increasingly vocalized his affinity for Buddhism. Each event was met with protest and alienated him from his court. In 1418, shortly after taking the throne, Sejong established a Buddhist shrine called Naebultang (내불당; 內佛堂) on the grounds of Gyeongbokgung. In 1420, two years after Sejong ascended the throne, Sejong's mother Queen Wŏn'gyŏng died. Sejong requested that a Buddhist monastery be built next to her grave out of filial respect. Taejong polled the ministers on whether the request should be accepted; implicitly, this forced the ministers to side with either Taejong or Sejong. In the end, the request was rejected. That same year, Sejong invited renowned Buddhist monk Kihwa to stay and lecture in the temple Taejaam (대자암; 大慈庵) at the previous royal palace at Kaesong. Sejong also privately believed in the healing power of Buddhism. In 1420, he prayed and had others pray to the medicine Buddha Bhaisajyaguru after the queen took ill. In 1423, he requested that Buddhist books from around Korea be sent to him. In 1426, it was requested that Sejong remove a dharani (Buddhist inscription) on the rafters of his throne room. He accepted the request. In 1428, he had Buddhist monks enter the palace on his birthday.

To quell anti-Buddhist criticisms of him, Sejong denied his faith to others a number of times. For example, in 1439, Sejong authorized the repair of the Buddhist temple Heungcheonsa in Seoul. In protest, a petition signed by 648 Confucianist students and scholars was delivered to Sejong, in which they accused Sejong of supporting Buddhism. Sejong submitted to the pressure and assured the protestors that he "had never worshipped the Buddha". In 1441, he said, "Since the Han and Tang dynasties, monarchs of China have all believed in Buddhism. I do the same". (Note: 한(漢)·당(唐) 이하 역대 임금들이 부처를 섬기지 아니한 이가 없었으니 나도 한다; 漢、唐以下歷代君王, 莫不事佛, 予亦爲之)

Familial deaths in the mid-1440s deepened Sejong's devotion to Buddhism. Sejong's sons Grand Prince Kwangp'yŏng and Grand Prince P'yŏngwŏn died in 1444 and 1445 respectively. Queen Sohŏn died in 1446. A 1449 record says, "His Majesty has lost two princes in succession, as well as the queen. Grief-stricken, He has come to let belief in karma fill the void in his heart". (Note: 임금이 두 대군(大君)을 연달아 잃고, 왕후가 이어 승하하니, 슬퍼함이 지극하여 인과화복(因果禍福)의 말이 드디어 그 마음의 허전한 틈에 들어맞았다; 上連喪二大君, 王后繼薨, 悲哀憾愴, 因果禍福之說, 遂中其隙) Sejong had temples hold memorial ceremonies for Sohŏn. By 1445, he was practicing Buddhist vegetarianism. In 1448 and 1449, Sejong had a Buddhist shrine built on the palace grounds. In 1449, when Sejong fell ill, he invited the monk Sinmi to conduct Buddhist services in the palace. The following year, Sinmi was granted honorary titles of respect. Grayson wrote that Sejong "died in the bosom of Buddhism".

=== Other religions ===
Sejong, like most other Joseon kings, disapproved of Korean shamanism. Beginning with the reign of Sejong, Korean shamans were barred from entering the capital. However, he appointed some shamans to posts in the public health organization outside the capital Hwarinsŏ.

In 1427, Sejong issued a decree against the Huihui (Korean Muslim) community that had enjoyed special status and stipends since the Yuan dynasty's rule over Goryeo. The Huihui were forced to abandon their headgear, close down their ceremonial hall—a mosque in Gaegyeong, present-day Kaesong—and worship like everyone else.

== Foreign policy ==
Sejong continued the Tang and Goryeo tradition of xianghua (向化; 향화; hyanghwa; "submitting-foreigner status"). This was a semi-hereditary set of designations for foreigners that allowed them to reside in Korea, with certain tax and civil exemptions for at least one generation; their descendants were eventually naturalized. The status's intent was to encourage peaceful, eventual naturalization and assimilation. For settlers around the capital, Sejong had the designation limited to one generation after the original immigrants. Joseon, under Sejong, also had separate pathways for naturalization of foreigners, including the granting of clan seats.

Sejong also continued the practice of allowing systematized forms of tribute from foreigners, namely Jurchens and Japanese people. Depending on group and status, a limited number of tributes were allowed to be given to the monarchy in exchange for political favor.

=== Japan–Korea relations ===
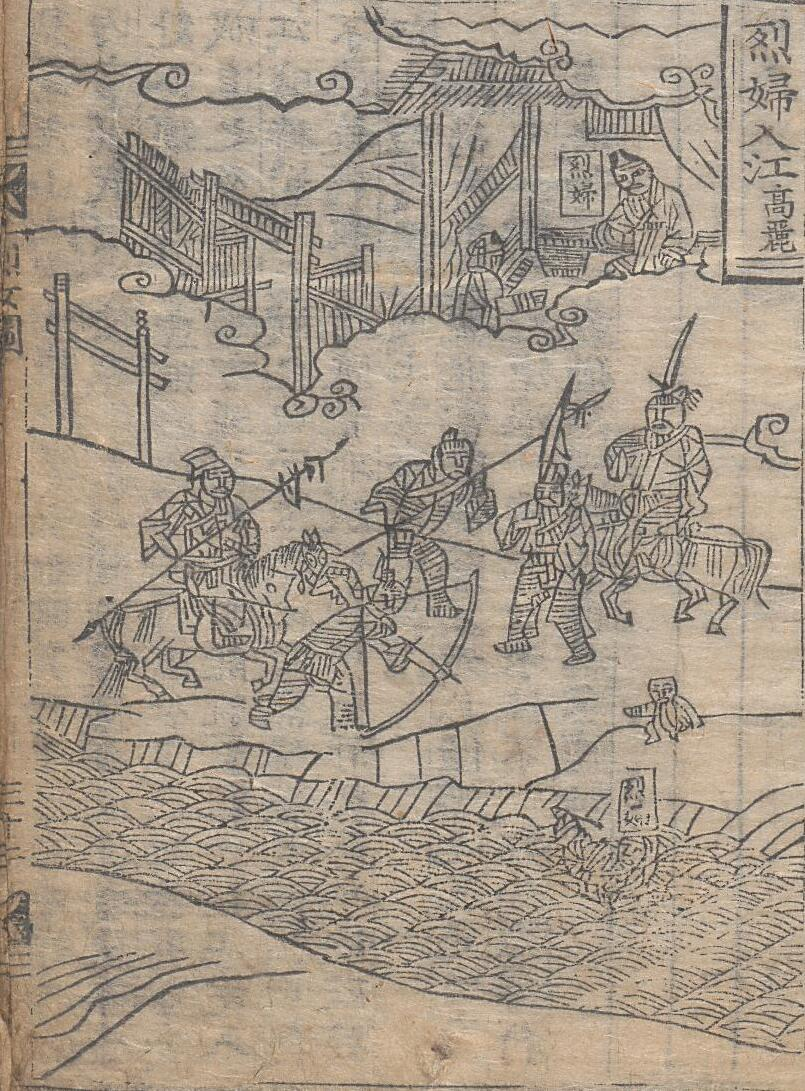
Wokou (center), depiction from Samganghaengsilto, produced during Sejong's reign

Sejong and his administration caused a decrease in raids from Japanese pirates (called wokou) and increase in trade with Japan. Due to the peaceful contact and trade, historian James B. Lewis described the 15th century encompassing Sejong's reign as "the peak of peaceful Japanese contact with Korea prior to the end of the twentieth century".

Although pirates from Tsushima Island raided Joseon's shores with declining frequency by the late Goryeo period, they still posed a threat by Sejong's reign. The pirates would steal materials, boats, and Korean people for enslavement. In 1418, a famine and the death of Tsushima leader Sō Sadashige led to increased raids on Joseon. In retaliation for this, in 1419, Sejong, under his father's guidance, launched the punitive Ōei Invasion against Tsushima. Joseon forces consisted of 227 ships and some 17,000 soldiers under command of Yi Chongmu. After 15 days of fighting, the lord of Tsushima surrendered. During this conflict, Japanese people that fled Tsushima were allowed to settle in Joseon as hyanghwa.

Joseon attempted to incorporate Tsushima into its own territory. Ten days before Joseon's punitive attack on Tsushima, Taejong claimed that Tsushima once belonged to Korea. Seven months afterwards, in 1420, the Korean court accepted a request of Tsushima lord Sō Sadamori (or someone claiming to represent Sadamori) that Tsushima be absorbed into Joseon. The Joseon court then considered Tsushima to be under the administrative boundaries of Gyeongsang Province. This absorption was later rejected by Sadamori. Ultimately, the absorption failed to occur.

Under Sejong, Joseon successfully incentivized Japanese leaders to discourage piracy in exchange for valuable trade access. Through this strategy, Joseon was able to change its focus from security to trade management. From Taejong's reign to Sejong's, raids dropped from 4.3 invasions per year to 1.8 and trade missions increased from 20.4 per year to 31.3. Japanese traders were restricted to all but three ports of Joseon; the third port was opened under Sejong in 1426. (Note: Ports were located at Pusanp'o (now part of Busan), Naeip'o (now part of Changwon), and Yŏmp'o (now part of Ulsan).) Japanese traders were also made to follow specific routes on specific days to reach the capital. In 1423, government warehouses were created for Japanese traders in the ports. In 1438, Joseon granted Tsushima lord Sō Sadamori a monopoly on issuing documents of passage for Japanese people to visit Joseon. This also benefitted Joseon in that it allowed them to offshore this administrative process and the possible associated backlash from rebuffed Japanese traders. In 1439, some limited exceptions to the monopoly were granted to other Japanese lords. In the 1443 Treaty of Kyehae, Joseon limited the number of ships at these ports from Japan to 50 per year.

Scholars have debated how Joseon under Sejong treated Japan. Several have argued that Joseon treated parts of Japan as if they were subordinate to Joseon. Envoys from even the shogun were symbolically ceremonially treated as if the shogun was a subject of Joseon. Japanese leaders were made to request copper seals (도서; 圖書; tosŏ) in order to access Joseon. Japanese leaders that showed greater aptitude in preventing piracy were granted greater rank and trade with Joseon. Historian Kenneth R. Robinson argued that Joseon had a unique and flexible relationship with the fractured "Japan" (Japan was not a strongly unified political entity by this time) that changed over time. He argued Joseon borrowed elements of China's tributary system for its own purposes.

Japanese leaders frequently requested Buddhist gifts from Joseon. For example, the Ōuchi clan persistently requested the wood printing blocks of the Tripitaka Koreana, to the chagrin of Sejong's Confucianist court. The blocks were valuable and expensive to produce copies of. Eventually, the Ōuchi clan was given printed copies of the Tripitaka instead, which were still expensive to produce.

=== Northern frontier and Jurchen relations ===
Sejong continued the work of his predecessors in pacifying and conquering the northern frontier. It was under Sejong that Korea's northern borders were expanded to reach their approximate current extent. The northern frontier was of strategic importance, as it served as the border between Korea and China, and because the local Jurchens would frequently raid Korean settlements. In 1432, the Hulun Udeha tribe (Eastern Jurchens) attacked Joseon.

Sejong launched military campaigns against the Jurchens and established garrison forces to pacify local populations. He sent one such campaign in 1433, with Ch'oe Yundŏk and Yi Ch'ŏn in command, and another in 1437 under Kim Chongsŏ. The latter campaign resulted in the creation of six garrisons in the region and the current northern borders of Korea.

Sejong also opened trade with Jurchens in order to discourage raids. This was possibly, in part, motivated by their previous successes in using trade to discourage Japanese piracy. From 1437 to 1443, the Hulun Udeha tribe that had previously attacked Joseon sent at least 127 trade missions to the Joseon court. Over time, restrictions and limits were applied on Jurchen trade missions to Joseon. Such trade was intended to provide Jurchens economic alternatives to raiding. Jurchens that aided Joseon were rewarded with rank and access to trade. His administration also moved Korean settlers to conquered regions and encouraged intermarriage between Jurchens and Koreans to deter conflict. During Sejong's reign, the entire population of Hamgyong Province north of Tanchon was described as the descendants of Jurchen hyanghwa. They eventually became full citizens of Joseon. Jurchens were also granted nominal appointments to the Korean military. These appointments did not require military service; they were instead meant to assimilate by integrating Jurchens into the Joseon bureaucracy.

Historians have evaluated Sejong's efforts in settling and pacifying the region as having mixed success. Korean settlers struggled to make a living in the frontier and often abandoned the land. The northern regions would continue to pose threats to Joseon's security after Sejong's reign.

=== China–Korea relations ===
Historian Shih-Shan Henry Tsai argued that the reign of Sejong saw an improvement in Sino-Korean relations and that "Sino-Korean borders became marketplaces instead of war zones". Sejong and the Ming Yongle Emperor often exchanged books and letters on various topics, including religion, philosophy, history, science, and technology. In 1423 alone, Sejong sent 10,000 tribute horses to Yongle. In return, Sejong received a huge quantity of silver, brocade, and silk. Sejong had the gate Yŏngŭnmun erected in Seoul in 1429 as a symbolic place of greeting for arriving Chinese envoys.

Sejong sought to balance the Joseon policy of sadae (Confucian deference to China) with the need for flexible governance and Korean autonomy. For example, a number of historians have argued that the semi-tributary relationships Sejong maintained with Japanese and Jurchen groups were technically forbidden by the Chinese tributary system. Under that system, tributaries to China could only interact with each other as equals, but Sejong chose to forego strict adherence to this for Joseon's benefit. Also, in at least one occasion early in his reign, Sejong expressed reluctance to perform ritual sacrifices to pray for rain; such rituals were seen as only appropriate for the Chinese emperor. Despite this, he eventually began performing the rituals. By the end of his reign, he stopped this practice. Sejong had a scholar write an essay that said that Korean kings also had the Mandate of Heaven, which was normally exclusively claimed by China. In 1449, when Ming requested that Joseon send 100,000 Korean troops to the Liaodong area of Manchuria, Joseon declined.

The anti-Buddhist policies under Sejong put Joseon at odds with Ming; in dealings with China, the Joseon court attempted to allay concerns that it was suppressing Buddhism. Around that time, Buddhism enjoyed significant support among the Ming court and gentry. Korean Buddhist monks escaped to Ming: 30 during the reign of Taejong and 9 during the reign of Sejong. Sejong asked the Yongle Emperor, a devout Buddhist, if those monks could be repatriated. Fearing what would happen to the monks, the Yongle Emperor declined.

== Hangul ==
Sejong was responsible for the development of Hangul, the native alphabet for the Korean language. It is debated to what extent Sejong was personally involved in its creation, although most scholars believe he was significantly involved. A minority of scholars believe that Sejong was the sole author. All contemporary documentary evidence suggests that he was, but many scholars argue Sejong would have been too busy to develop Hangul on his own.

Before the invention of Hangul, Korea had been using Hanja (Chinese characters), as well as related systems like Idu and Hyangchal, since antiquity. The difficulty of the systems limited their use to mostly upper-class people; commoners were largely illiterate. Also, the scripts are not well suited for representing the Korean language; the Chinese and Korean languages are not closely related and differ in significant ways. Korean pronunciation and ideas could only be indirectly represented.

Due to a lack of records on the topic, it is not known when work on Hangul first began. A number of scholars have argued that the creation of the 1434 Samganghaengsilto caused Sejong to become interested in universal literacy. Also, Sejong long had a personal interest in linguistics and languages. He took a personal interest in the activities of the Bureau of Interpreters, and himself took Chinese lessons from early on in his reign. A 1435 record claimed that Sejong practiced colloquial spoken Chinese every other day and took lessons from famed linguist Yi Pyŏn. Hangul was possibly developed in secret, in anticipation of the backlash that it eventually received, although this is debated.

The script was revealed, likely mostly completed, to Sejong's court in the 12th month of 1443. In the 2nd month of 1444, a major faction in the Hall of Worthies led by Ch'oe Malli made a famous rebuke of the script. Ch'oe and several others argued that Hangul was anti-Confucian, as they felt it was too far a departure from Chinese civilization. Sejong rebutted that he felt the script was Confucian, as it was created out of a desire to benefit his subjects. Anti-Hangul sentiment was also partially motivated by elitism; literacy in Hanja was then seen as a status symbol, and promoting general literacy could be seen as harming the social positions of the elite. The script was initially dubbed ŏnmun (언문; 諺文; lit. 'vernacular script'), which developed an elitist connotation of "vulgar writing". Sejong had Ch'oe and several others imprisoned for a single day.

At some point, (Note: The office's official establishment is recorded in the Veritable Records as on the 8th day, 11th month of 1446, but Ledyard argues the office was likely active before this, likely soon after Sejong announced the script. Either way, scholarly work was actively being performed on Hangul before 1446.) Sejong recruited young men of the Hall of Worthies for a new office dedicated to Hangul that was dubbed Ŏnmunch'ŏng (lit. 'Vernacular Script Commission'). (Note: Ledyard argues that Ŏnmunch'ŏng was likely not the name of the department at the time, and that that name was likely inserted into the Veritable Records of Sejong by anti-Hangul literati. The office's official establishment is recorded in the Veritable Records as on the 8th day, 11th month of 1446, but Ledyard argues the office was likely active before this, likely soon after Sejong announced the script. Either way, scholarly work was actively being performed on Hangul before 1446.) It worked on developing official documentation for Hangul. It also worked on several major literary projects related to Hangul, including the 1447 rhyme dictionary Tongguk chŏngun and the first major piece of Hangul literature Yongbiŏch'ŏn'ga.

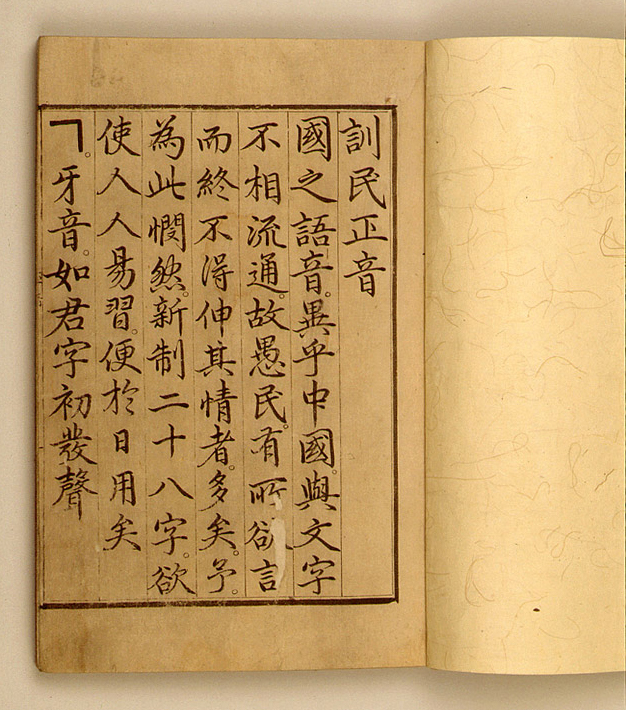
First page of the Hunminjeongeum Haerye, showing the intro by Sejong

In the 9th month of 1446, Hangul's documentation was completed and published in the texts Hunminjeongeum and its companion commentary text Hunminjeongeum Haerye. The Hunminjeongeum was penned by Sejong himself, while the Haerye was compiled by a group of scholars of the Ŏnmunch'ŏng led by Chŏng Inji. The Hunminjeongeum begins with this now-famous quote:

The sounds of our country's language are different from those of the Middle Kingdom and are not confluent with the sounds of characters. Therefore, among the ignorant people, there have been many who, having something they want to put into words, have in the end been unable to express their feelings. I have been distressed because of this, and have newly designed twenty-eight letters, which I wish to have everyone practice at their ease and make convenient for their daily use.

— Sejong the Great, Hunminjeongeum, preface

Sejong attempted to lightly pressure his detractors and subjects into accepting the script, to limited success. Ledyard argues that Sejong intentionally did not aggressively force the script on others as to avoid more severe backlash. Ledyard evaluated this hypothesized strategy favorably and said it likely contributed to Hangul's eventual success. He attempted to integrate Hangul into bureaucratic examinations and the curricula of government schools like the Sŏnggyun'gwan, although such integrations were often removed after his death.

Despite Sejong's efforts, Hangul continued to be looked down upon until the end of the Joseon period, over 400 years later. It was only officially adopted by the government in 1894, during the Kabo Reform.

== Later life and death ==
Sejong reported to having recurring and worsening health issues for much of his life; a number of these complaints were recorded in the Veritable Records. One of the earliest records of his complaints was made when he was 22 years old; he then claimed to have knee and back pain. In his 30s, he complained of back pain and began reporting problems with his vision, excess thirst, and excess urination. In his 40s, he complained of his vision problems with greater frequency. He had a reputation for enjoying the consumption of meat and having a sedentary lifestyle. Beginning in 1445, he was practicing Buddhist vegetarianism.

Scholars have attempted to infer what diseases he had based on historical evidence. The predominant hypotheses are that Sejong had either type 1 or type 2 diabetes. (Note: Sources that express support for the diabetes hypothesis:) Medical researcher JiHwan Lee disputes that diagnosis and argues that Sejong's symptoms more closely resemble those of ankylosing spondylitis (a type of arthritis). Lee argues that either type of diabetes would have been lethal to him sooner, and that Sejong did not have a clear family history of diabetes.

Beginning in 1437, Sejong began asking his ministers if lesser governmental affairs could be delegated to the crown prince, as he was feeling unwell. Historian Martina Deuchler argued Sejong asked this because he intended to ease the crown prince into politics to make the succession smoother. His ministers dismissed his health concerns then and multiple times over for years onwards, including in 1438, 1439, and 1442. In 1439, he stopped attending the royal lectures due to his health issues. Finally, apparently frustrated with the lack of progress, Sejong issued an edict in 1443 in which he declared the crown prince would handle minor state affairs for the last half of each month, and that all ministers must proclaim their loyalty to him. This sparked furious protest from across the government. Some ministers balked at the idea of being presided over by the crown prince, and others expressed concerns that the division of royal authority could destabilize the state. After years of debate and compromise, in 1445, the crown prince began to handle the routine affairs of government. Historian Kim Jongmyung argues that Sejong then devoted himself wholeheartedly to working on Hangul.

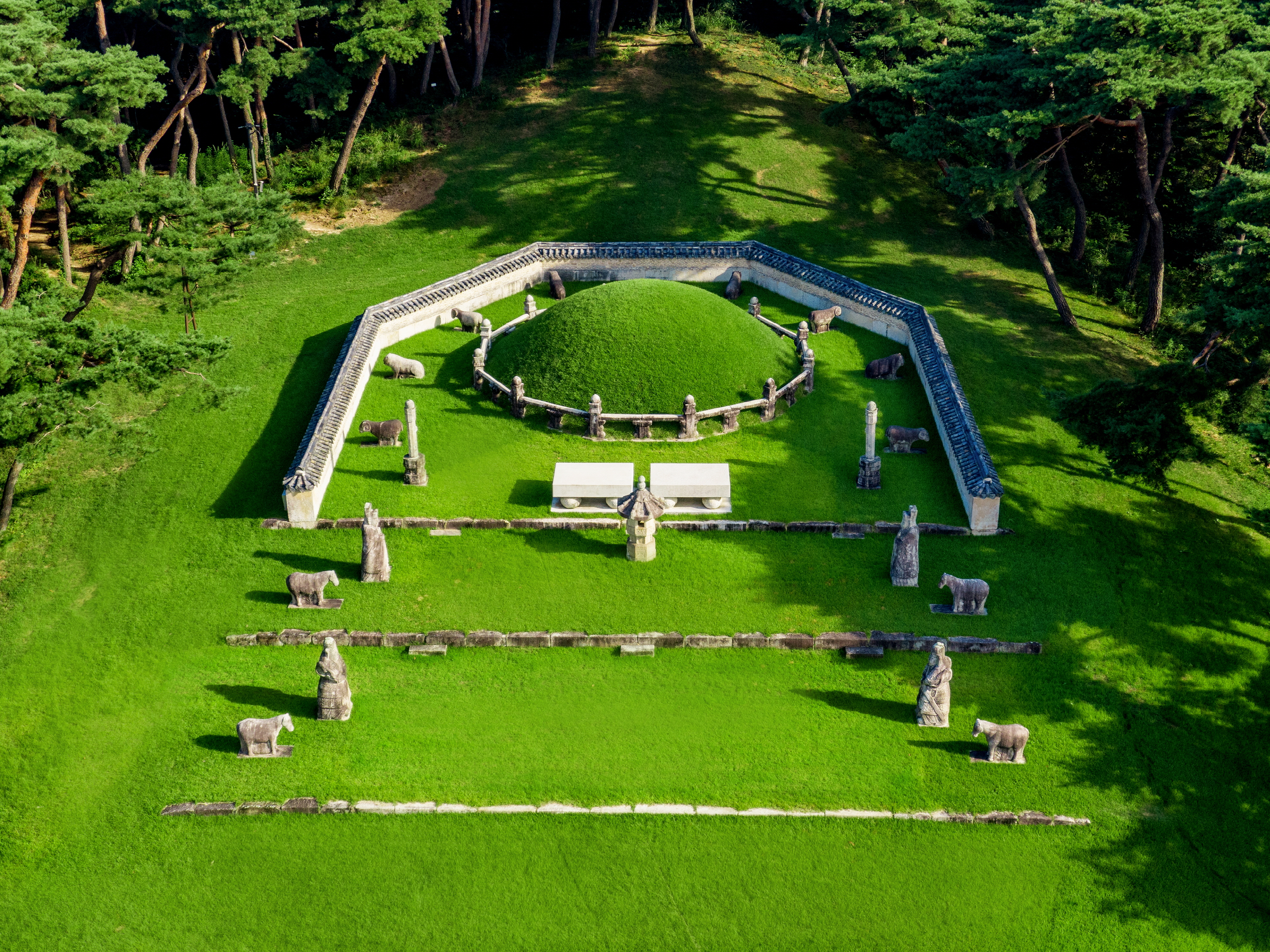
Yeongneung: the tomb of Sejong

In his last years, Sejong spent much of his time in his study, writing poetry. Even while in deep pain, Sejong reportedly insisted on learning and attending lectures, and would even stay up past midnight to do so. In 1446, after the promulgation of Hangul, he said to his ministers that he was "suffering from various illnesses and just waiting in the palace for death". In the last months of his life, his pains grew more serious. On the 22nd day, 1st month of 1450, he moved into the residence of Grand Prince Hyoryŏng to receive treatment for his illnesses. He died on the 17th day, 2nd month of 1450 at the age of 52, in the residence of Grand Prince Yŏngŭng in Gyeongbokgung's East Palace. He was the first Joseon king to die while in office. He is buried in the tomb Yeongneung. That tomb was originally located in what is now Seocho District in Seoul, but in 1469 it was moved to what is now Yeoju after it was determined that the geomantic properties of the new site were superior. He is buried alongside Queen Sohŏn.

== Reception and legacy ==
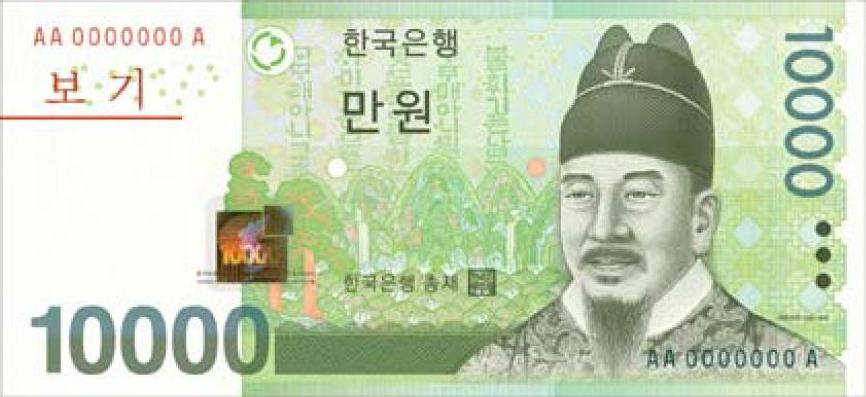
King Sejong the Great, as depicted on the Bank of Korea's 10,000 won banknote (Series VI).

Sejong has been evaluated by a number of historians as the greatest monarch in Korean history. His reign has been described as a Golden Age by various historians. Of all kings of Joseon, his name is mentioned the most throughout the Veritable Records: over 2000 times. Sejong has since served as a legendary figure in Korean science. His successors venerated and made attempts to revive Sejong-era science and practice. A 2024 survey by Gallup Korea of 1,777 South Koreans found that Sejong was named the second most times as their most respected historical figure, after Yi Sun-sin. Sejong's creation of the Korean alphabet is celebrated every 9 October as Hangul Day, a national holiday.

Multiple places in South Korea, including Sejong Street, Sejong–Pocheon Expressway, and Sejong City, South Korea's de facto administrative capital, are named after him. Various institutes such as King Sejong Station in Antarctica, the King Sejong Institute, the Sejong Center for the Performing Arts, Sejong Science High School, and Sejong University also bear his name. A 9.5-meter-high (31 ft) bronze statue of King Sejong, unveiled in 2009 in celebration of the 563rd anniversary of the invention of the Korean alphabet, now sits on a concrete pedestal on the boulevard of Gwanghwamun Square and directly in front of the Sejong Center for the Performing Arts in Seoul. The pedestal contains one of the several entrances to the 3,200 m^{2} underground museum exhibit entitled "The Story of King Sejong". The Sejong the Great-class destroyers are also named for him. Since 1973, a portrait of Sejong has been on the South Korean 10,000-won bank note, along with various scientific tools invented under his reign. He was previously depicted on the 1000-hwan bill and 500-hwan bill until they were decommissioned in 1962.

In North Korea, Sejong is discussed much less than in the South and more negatively than elsewhere. According to South Korean researcher of North Korea Lee Kyu-Duk, one North Korean history book Chosŏn t'ongsa (조선통사) claims that Hangul was invented in order to facilitate feudal exploitation of the peasantry. While the book evaluates Hangul's linguistic features positively, it downplays the contributions of Sejong in developing the script and instead attributes its development to the intellect of the masses. Lee argued the following quote from a North Korean history work was representative of North Korean writings on Sejong:

During his 30-year reign, Sejong played a major role in repelling foreign invasions, reclaiming the old territories of Goguryeo and Balhae, and developing feudal culture. However, as the monarch of a feudal state, everything he did was in service of consolidating feudalism. Thus, even during his reign, which was dubbed "an era of peace", peasant uprisings against feudal oppression and exploitation occurred several times.

— Chosŏn ryŏksa sangsik (조선력사상식)

== Family ==
=== Ancestry ===
Ancestors of Sejong the Great

8. Yi Chach'un
4. King Taejo
9. Queen Ŭihye
2. King Taejong
10. Han Kyŏng, Internal Prince Anch'ŏn
5. Queen Sin'ui of the Cheongju Han clan
11. Lady Sin of the Sangnyeong Shin clan, Grand Princess Consort of Samhan State
1. Sejong
12. Min Pyŏn
6. Min Che, Internal Prince Yŏhŭng and Duke Mundo
3. Queen Wŏn'gyŏng
14. Song Sŏn
7. Lady Song of the Yeosan Song clan, Grand Princess Consort of Samhan State

=== Consorts and issue ===
Officially, Sejong had 18 sons and 4 daughters. He also had a 19th son, Prince Tang (1442–? (Note: Possibly died before 1446, as a 1446 record has it that Prince Tamyang was then Sejong's youngest living son.)), that died in childhood and was never included in the family genealogy book.

- Queen Sohŏn of the Cheongsong Sim clan (1395–1446)
  - Princess Chŏngso (1412–1424)
  - King Munjong (1414–1452), first son
  - Princess Chŏngŭi (1414 or 1415 – 1477)
  - King Sejo (1417–1468), second son
  - Grand Prince Anpyeong (1418–1453), third son
  - Grand Prince Imyŏng (1420–1469), fourth son
  - Grand Prince Kwangp'yŏng (1425–1444), fifth son
  - Grand Prince Kŭmsŏng (1426–1456), seventh son
  - Grand Prince P'yŏngwŏn (1427–1445), ninth son
  - Grand Prince Yŏngŭng (1434–1467), fifteenth son
- Royal Noble Consort Sin of the Cheongpung Kim clan (1406–1464)
  - Two daughters, both died young
  - Prince Kyeyang (1427–1464), eighth son
  - Prince Ŭich'ang (1428–1460), tenth son
  - Prince Milsŏng (1430–1479), twelfth son
  - Prince Ikhyŏn (1431–1463), fourteenth son
  - Prince Yŏnghae (1435–1477), seventeenth son
  - Prince Tamyang (1439–1450), eighteenth son
- Royal Noble Consort Hye of the Cheongju Yang clan (?–1455)
  - Prince Hannam (1429–1459), eleventh son
  - Prince Such'un (1431–1455), thirteenth son
  - Prince Yŏngp'ung (1431–1463), sixteenth son
- Royal Noble Consort Yŏng of the Jinju Kang clan (?–1483)
  - Prince Hwaŭi (1425–?), sixth son
- Royal Consort Pak of the Miryang Park clan
- Royal Consort Ch'oe of the Jeonju Choe clan
- Royal Consort Cho (숙의 조씨; 淑儀曺氏)
- Consort Hong (?–1452)
- Consort Yi
  - Princess Chŏngan (?–1461)
- Lady Song (1396–1463)
  - Princess Chŏnghyŏn (1425–1480)
- Lady Ch'a (?–1444 (Note: Killed by a lightning strike))
  - Daughter (1430–1431)

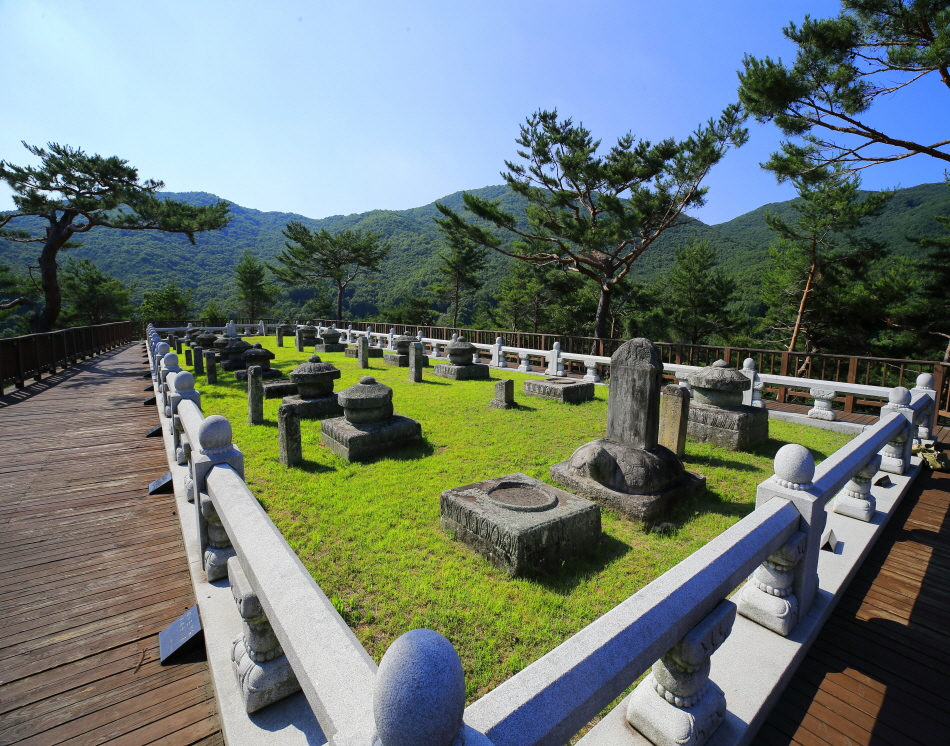
Placenta Chambers of King Sejong's Sons

The Placenta Chambers of King Sejong's Sons in Seongju County is a Historic Site of South Korea. It was built from 1438 to 1442. The plot contains nineteen placenta chambers (chambers that hold the placenta of newborn children). Eighteen of the chambers belong to Sejong's sons and a nineteenth belongs to Sejong's grandson, King Danjong.

== In popular culture ==
=== Television series and films ===
Television series
Year	Portrayed by	Title	Refs
1973	Nam Il-woo	King Sejong the Great	
1980	Nam Seong-u	Pacheonmu	
1983	Han In-su	500 Years of Joseon Dynasty Tree with Deep Roots	
1998–2000	Ahn Jae-mo	Tears of the Dragon	
1998–2000	Song Jae-ho	The King and the Queen	
2007	Kim Jun-sik	Sayuksin	
2008	Lee Hyun-woo	The Great King, Sejong	
2008	Kim Sang-kyung	The Great King, Sejong	
2011	Kang San	Deep Rooted Tree	
2011	Song Joong-ki	Deep Rooted Tree	
2011	Han Suk-kyu	Deep Rooted Tree	
2011	Jeon Moo-song	Insu, the Queen Mother	
2015	Yoon Doo-joon	Splash Splash Love	
2016	Nam Da-reum	Six Flying Dragons	
2016	Kim Sang-kyung	Jang Yeong-sil	
2021	Jang Dong-yoon	Joseon Exorcist	
2022	Kim Min-gi	The King of Tears, Lee Bang-won	
2025	Lee Jun-young	The Queen Who Crowns	

Films
Year	Portrayed by	Title	Refs
1962	Kim Un-ha	A Wanderer	
1964	Choi Nam-hyeon	Sejong the Great	
1978	Shin Seong-il	King Sejong the Great	
2008	Ahn Sung-ki	The Divine Weapon	
2012	Ju Ji-hoon	I Am the King	
2019	Song Kang-ho	The King's Letters	
2019	Han Suk-kyu	Forbidden Dream	
2023	Son Geon-u	Yeonak, My Destiny	

=== Video games ===
- Sejong is the leader of the Korean civilization in the 2022 Leader Pass DLC of Civilization VI, Sid Meier's Civilization V, and Civilization Revolution 2.
- Sejong is the leader of Korea in the 2022 Ara: History Untold.

== See also ==
- Sejong the Great-class destroyer
- UNESCO King Sejong Literacy Prize

== Notes ==
Sejong the Great House of Yi Born: 10 April 1397 Died: 17 February 1450
Regnal titles
Preceded by Taejong	King of Joseon; 10 August 1418 – 17 February 1450	Succeeded by Munjong
