= Yeongneung =

Tomb of Sejong the Great

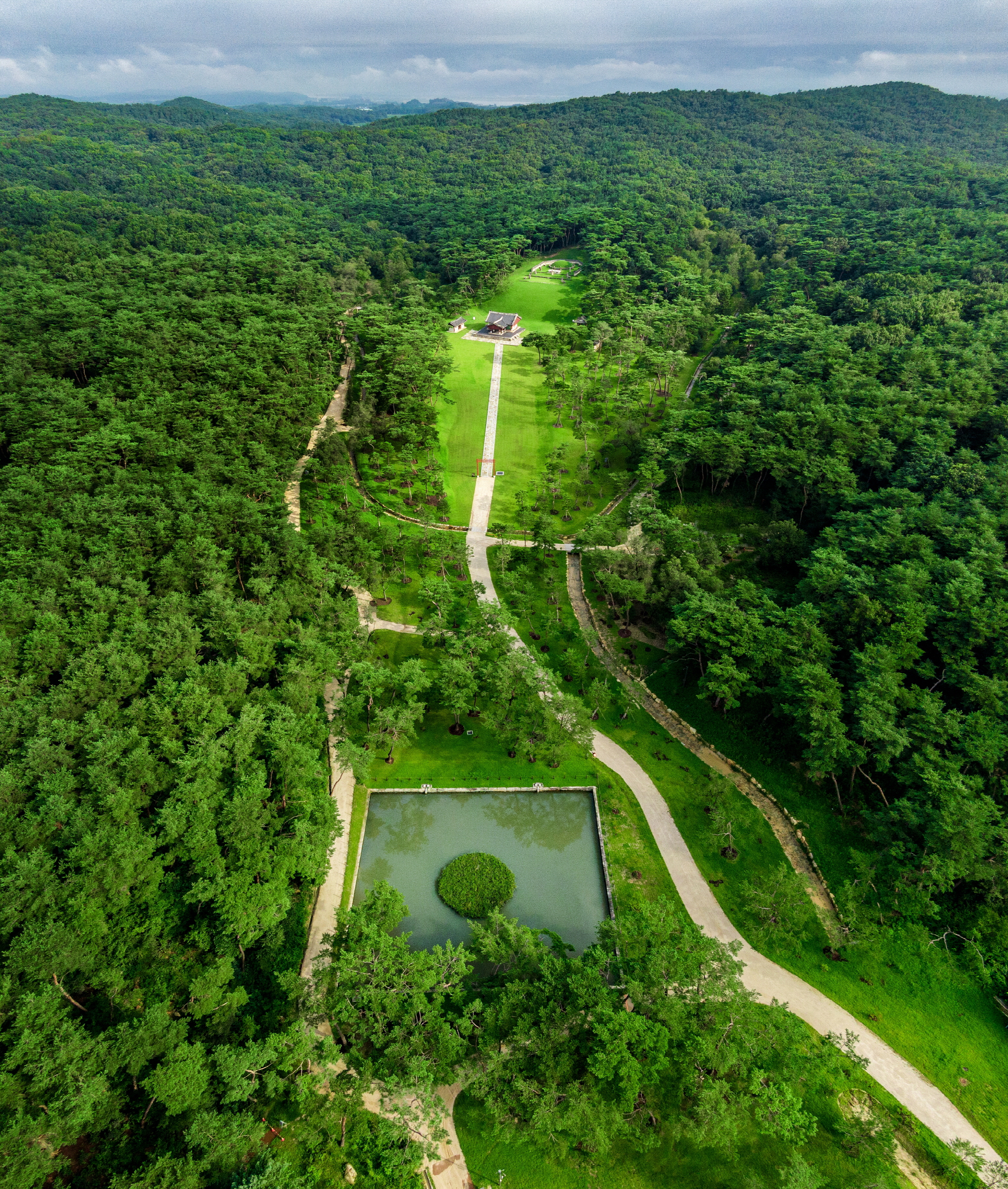
- Aerial view of the tomb complex
- Interactive map of Yeongneung

Details
- Location: Yeoju, Gyeonggi Province, South Korea
- Coordinates: 37.307°N 127.603°E

UNESCO World Heritage Site
- Official name: Royal Tombs of the Joseon Dynasty

Historic Sites of South Korea
- Official name: Yeongneung and Nyeongneung Royal Tombs, Yeoju
- Designated: 1970-05-27

Korean name
- Hangul: 영릉
- Hanja: 英陵
- RR: Yeongneung
- MR: Yŏngnŭng

Yeongneung (Korean: 영릉; Hanja: 英陵) is the joint tomb of King Sejong the Great of the Joseon dynasty and his wife, Queen Soheon. It is the first joint burial of a king and queen in the Joseon royal tombs. Located in Yeoju, Gyeonggi Province, South Korea, it forms part of the Yeongnyeongneung cluster of royal tombs, which is designated as Historic Site No. 195 and a UNESCO World Heritage Site as part of the Royal Tombs of the Joseon Dynasty.

== History ==
Originally located near Heolleung (now Naegok-dong, Seocho District, Seoul), the tomb was relocated to its current site in 1469 during the first year of King Seongjong. The move was prompted by geomantic beliefs. The site underwent restoration in 1977 to preserve its historical features.

== Layout ==
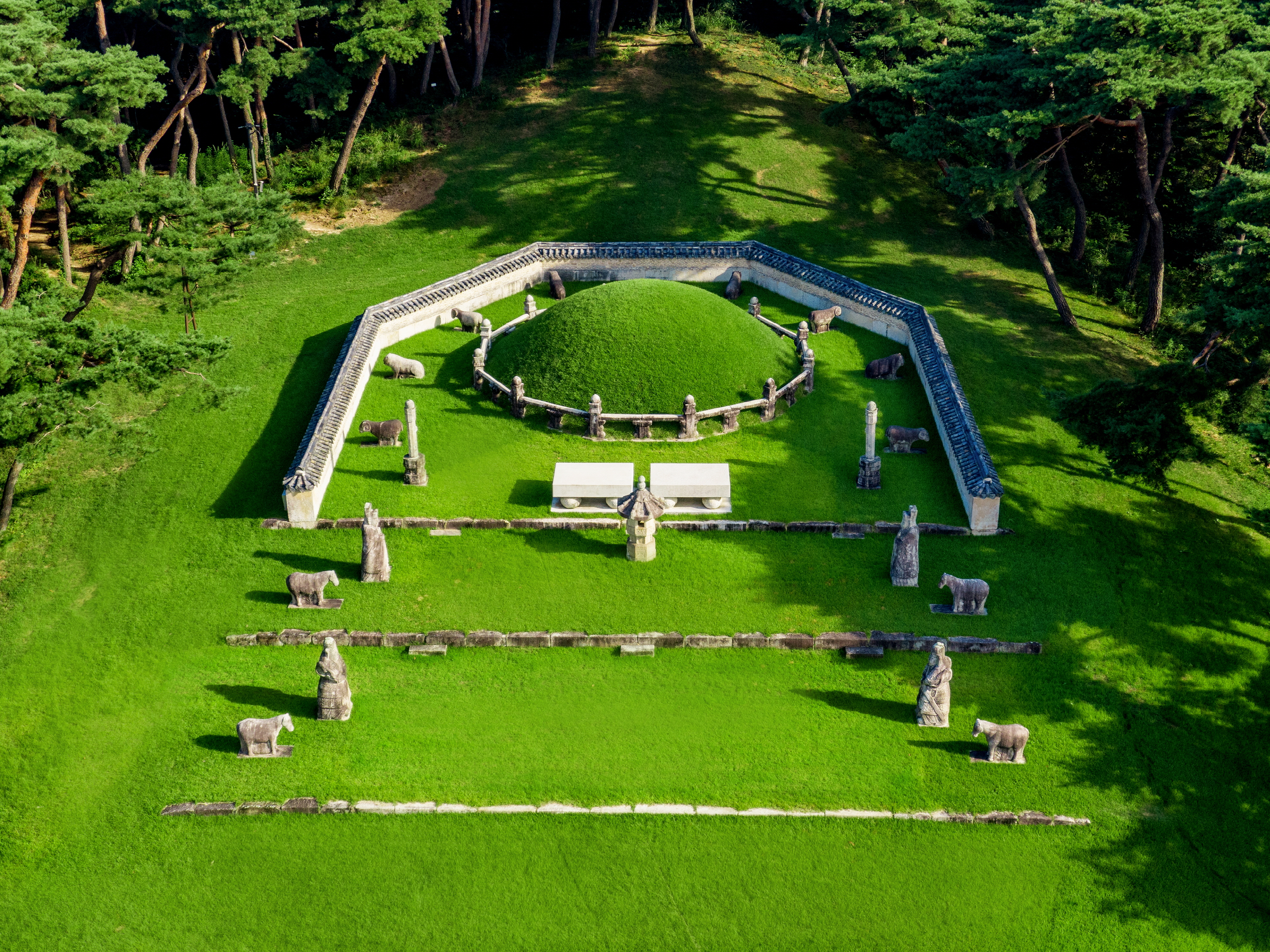
The tomb

Yeongneung exemplifies Joseon Dynasty tomb architecture and rituals. As a joint tomb, it features two honyuseok (mingled animal stones) at the burial chamber entrance. The mound is encircled by a stone railing, with twelve stone pillars inscribed with the Twelve Earthly Branches.

The site's terrain is said to resemble a phoenix descending with layered sun and moon motifs, considered an ideal feng shui location. Entering through the main gate, visitors find the ritual hall and a statue of King Sejong to the right, and the Sejong Memorial Hall (Sejongjeon) to the left. Sejongjeon displays artifacts related to Sejong's achievements, including portraits of Jiphyeonjeon scholars and replicas of scientific instruments. Outdoors, restored items such as a sundial, water clock (jagyeokru), and Celestial Globe Observatory (Gwancheondae) are exhibited on the lawn.

An octagonal stone lantern stands before the tomb path, flanked by stone figures (seoksang), stone horses (seokma), civil officials (muninseok), and martial officials (muinseok). The shrine hall (jeongjagak) aligns axially with the mound, but the red-spiked gate (hongsalmun) is offset, creating a bent approach path. The current gate position suggests later relocation, with original foundation stones remaining. The guard quarters (subokbang) and kitchen (suragan) adjoin the shrine, a unique arrangement.

The tomb is surrounded by stone animals (tiger, sheep, horse), officials' figures, and supporting stones (mangjuseok), with a low curved wall at the rear. Ancestral rites occur at the jeongjagak, with the tomb stele and pedestal to the east. Scientific replicas and exhibits in Sejongjeon highlight Sejong's innovations in science and scholarship.

Annual events tied to Sejong's legacy, including Hangul Day commemorations on October 9, draw visitors. The site remains popular for its historical and cultural significance.
