= Ch'oe Malli =

Korean academic (fl. 15th century)

Ch'oe Manli 최만리
- Born: Haeju, Punghae Province, Goryeo
- Died: October 23, 1445; Anseong, Gyeonggi Province, Joseon
- Other names: Choi Man-ri, Choe Mal-li, Choi Mal-li
- Education: Saengwonsi (생원시) in 1419 (passed); Liberal Arts Examination (문과 급제) in 1427
- Occupation(s): Warrior, Politician, Confucian scholar, Jurist, Associate Professor in the Hall of Worthies
- Era: King Sejong of Joseon the Great
- Known for: Made the following submission to against King Sejong' Hangul
- Spouse: Lady Yang of the Junghwa Yang clan
- Children: Ch'oe Kak; Ch'oe Chŏng; Ch'oe Tang; Ch'oe Ŭn; Ch'oe Yŏn; Lady Ch'oe
- Parents: Ch'oe Ha (father); Lady Chi of the Chungju Chi clan (mother)
- Relatives: Yun Hoe (in-law); Yi Ŭisŏk (son-in-law)

Korean name
- Hangul: 최만리
- Hanja: 崔萬里
- RR: Choe Manri
- MR: Ch'oe Malli

Art name
- Hangul: 강호산인
- Hanja: 江湖散人
- RR: Ganghosanin
- MR: Kanghosanin

Courtesy name
- Hangul: 자명
- Hanja: 子明
- RR: Jamyeong
- MR: Chamyŏng

Posthumous name
- Hangul: 공혜
- Hanja: 恭惠
- RR: Gonghye
- MR: Konghye

Ch'oe Manli (Korean: 최만리; Hanja: 崔萬里, d. October 23, 1445) was an associate professor (부제학; 副提學) in the Hall of Worthies who spoke against the creation of Hangul (then called ŏnmun) together with other Confucian scholars in 1444. He submitted a protest that year to King Sejong against Hangul.

== Protest against Hangul ==
Literary Chinese	English translation
集賢殿副提學崔萬里等 上疏曰 臣等伏觀 諺文制作 至爲神妙 創物運智 瓊出千古 然而以臣等區區管見 尙有可疑者 敢布危懇 謹疏于後 伏惟 聖裁	"Ch'oe Malli, Deputy Minister for Education in the Hall of Worthies, and others make this submission: Your Majesty's subjects observe that ŏnmun is a creation of sublime wisdom and its beauty has never been seen before. However, in our limited vision, we still have some doubts and would like to set out our sincerity by listing them below, which await Your Majesty's decision.
我朝自祖宗以來 至誠事大 一遵華制 今當同文同軌之時 創作諺文 有駭觀聽 儻曰諺文 皆本古字非新字也 則字形雖倣古之篆文 用音合字盡反於古 實無所據 若流中國 或有非議者 豈不有愧於事大慕華	"Our dynasty, from our ancestors, has followed the great and complied with the standards of China. Now we are of the same script and the same measure, it is appalling to create a new orthography such as ŏnmun. If one claims that ŏnmun is based on old writing and is not new: however, though the form of ŏnmun characters imitate the ancient seal script, but to create a script by combining phonetics are against tradition and are, indeed, without antecedent. If the Chinese hear about this and present their objections, it shall be our shame in serving the great and admiring China.
自古九州之內 風土雖異 未有因方言而別爲文字者 雖蒙古西夏女眞日本西蕃之類各有其字 是皆夷狄事耳無足道者 傳曰用夏變夷 未聞變於夷者也 歷代中國皆以我國箕子遺風 文物禮欒 比擬中華 今別作諺文 捨中國自同於夷狄是所謂棄蘇合之香而取螗螂之丸也 豈非文明之大累哉	"Within the realms of Nine Regions, though customs may differ, but their dialectal speech never caused the people thereof to develop their own script. Though western barbarians such as the Mongols, the Tangut, the Jurchens, the Japanese, and the Tibetans all have their own script, but it is a matter of being barbaric and does not merit consideration. The saying is "use Xia [dynasty culture] to convert the barbarians" - who has ever heard of adapting to their ways? Through its various dynasties, China has always taken us to be the descendants of Kija, the legendary Chinese Viscount of Ji because our artefacts, customs, and rituals are similar to those of China. Now if we were to create separate ŏnmun, discard China and make ourselves alike to the barbarians, we would as it were 'desert the fragrant herbs for the dung of a praying mantis.' How could this not be a setback to our civilization?
新羅薜聰吏讀, 雖爲鄙俚, 然皆借中國通行之字, 施於語助, 與文字元不相離, 故雖至胥吏僕隷之徒, 必欲習之。 先讀數書, 粗知文字, 然後乃用吏讀。 用吏讀者, 須憑文字, 乃能達意, 故因吏讀而知文字者頗多, 亦興學之一助也。 若我國, 元不知文字, 如結繩之世, 則姑借諺文, 以資一時之用猶可, 而執正議者必曰: "與其行諺文以姑息, 不若寧而習中國通行之文字, 以爲久長之計也。" 而況吏讀行之數千年, 而簿書期會等事, 無有防礎者, 何用改舊行無弊之文, 別創鄙諺無益之字乎? 若行諺文, 則爲吏者專習諺文, 不顧學問文字, 吏員岐而爲二。 苟爲吏者以諺文而宦達, 則後進皆見其如此也, 以爲: "二十七字諺文, 足以立身於世, 何須苦心勞思, 窮性理之學哉?" 如此則數十年之後, 知文字者必少。 雖能以諺文而施於吏事, 不知聖賢之文字, 則不學墻面, 昧於事理之是非, 徒工於諺文, 將何用哉? 我國家積累右文之化, 恐漸至掃地矣。 前此吏讀, 雖不外於文字, 有識者尙且鄙之, 思欲以吏文易之, 而況諺文與文字, 暫不干涉, 專用委巷俚語者乎? 借使諺文自前朝有之, 以今日文明之治, 變魯至道之意, 尙肯因循而襲之乎? 必有更張之議者, 此灼然可知之理也。 厭舊喜新, 古今通患, 今此諺文不過新奇一藝耳, 於學有損, 於治無益, 反覆籌之, 未見其可也。	Although Idu, a script created by Seol Chong in Silla, is rustic and indecent, it assists the language by recording Korean words through its equivalent meaning or sound in Chinese, which does not alienate itself from Hanja. Therefore, even petty officers and servants would like to learn it. Through reading a few books, they would have a rough understanding of Hanja and would turn to Idu after that. Since Idu users have to learn Hanja in order to express themselves, and therefore, many have acquired Hanja ability through it. It is, still, an assistance to the promotion of education. If our country had no script at all in the first place, as if the knotting-string era, then it is still plausible to implement ŏnmun as a tentative measure. That said, upstanding officials must say," Compare with learning the interim ŏnmun to muddle along, one should rather tardily learn Hanja, which is prevalent in China, in the long run. Moreover, Idu has been working for thousands of years, and there hasn't been any hindrance to the bureaucratic paperwork. Then why should we change the effectual script by inventing a vulgar and futile one? Should ŏnmun is to be implemented, then officials would solely study ŏnmun and ignore the scholarly Hanja script, splitting the officialdom into two. Should a senior bureaucrat have a successful career without knowing ŏnmun, then the juniors would think that: "If (knowing) 27 ŏnmun characters already suffices to position ourselves in the world, why should we exhaust ourselves to pursue the Chinese-based Confucianism?" If that is the case, then hardly anyone would know Hanja decades later. Although ŏnmun might be helpful in the bureaucracy, not knowing the script of the saint is as ignorant as staring at a plain wall, oblivious to right and wrong. What is the purpose of being good at ŏnmun? I am afraid our accumulation of culture will be gradually obliterated. The Idu aforementioned, although borrowing Hanja, is stilled despised by people with insight who intend to replace it by authentic Chinese, the officialese. Not to mention that ŏnmun has nothing to do with Hanja at all. Why are we to use such earthy and indecent script? Even if ŏnmun has already existed in the past dynasties, but by considering our prosperous civilization today, should we still be willing to follow it? It is evidently obvious that there must be proposals rectifying it. Loathing the old out of the desire for the new is a general problem of all times, regardless of past and present. Now, such ŏnmun is nothing but a new gadget. It is detrimental to study and is of no good to political governance. I don't see the feasibility of planning for it over and over.
若曰如刑殺獄辭 以吏讀文字書之 則不知文理之愚民 一字之差 容或致冤 今以諺文直書其言 讀使聽之 則雖至愚之人 悉皆易曉而無抱屈者 然自古中國言與文同 獄訟之間 冤枉甚多 借以我國言之 獄囚之解吏讀者 親讀招辭 知其誣而不勝棰楚 多有枉服者 是非不知招辭之文意而被冤也明矣 若然則雖用諺文 何異於此 是知刑獄之平不平 在於獄吏之如何 而不在於言與文之同不同也 欲以諺文而平獄辭 臣等未見其可也	"Some might claim that when it comes to the criminal justice system, for testimonies written in Idu, the ignorant illiterates might be wronged by the mere nuances in words. Now, with the help of ŏnmun, (the judiciary) can write directly and inform the prisoners. Even the most ignorant commoners will all no longer be unfairly treated. That being said, China has been using the same spoken and written language, yet wrongful convictions are still pervasive. By taking this as an example, Korean prisoners who master Idu are able to read their testimonies, but they would still often submit themselves to misjudges when being tortured, even having known that they are wronged. It should be more than clear that the miscarriage of justice has nothing to do with one's understanding of what was written in one's testimony. If that is the case, then the situation would still be of no different than that even if ŏnmun were to be implemented. Now (we) know that the fairness of the justice system depends on how do the prison officers perform their duties, instead of whether the written and the spoken languages are of the same script. We do not regard ŏnmun as a tool to equalize the judiciary.
先儒云 凡百玩好 皆奪志 至於書札 於儒者事最近 然一向好著 亦自喪志 今東宮雖德性成就 猶當潛心聖學 益求其未至 諺文縱曰有益 特文士六藝之一耳 況萬萬無一利於治道 而乃硏精費思 竟日移時實有損於時敏之學也 臣等俱以文墨末技 待罪侍從 心有所懷 不敢含默 謹罄肺腑 仰瀆聖聰	"[...] The ancient Confucian sages say: 'The various diversions take their toll on the spirit.'As for writing, it is the most relevant business to a Confucian scholar. But if it becomes a diversion, it will also take its toll on the spirit. Now though Your Royal Highness has achieved some of the best of virtues, there are still sagely studies to be devoted to, and [Your Royal Highness should] further pursue what hasn't been attained. Though ŏnmun could be beneficial, it is only one of the six arts for an accomplished scholar, not to mention that it does not conduce the political art of governance. Spending too much thought and effort on this is a waste of time, detrimental to the timely pursuit of scholarship. We have been serving Your Majesty with our most incompetent ability to write, yet do not have the audacity to remain silent. We would like to manifest our most sincere thoughts wholeheartedly. And please excuse us should the submission profane Your Majesty's divine omniscience."

== Family ==
- Father - Ch'oe Ha (최하; 崔荷); 11th generation descendant of Ch'oe Ch'ung
- Mother - Lady Chi of the Chungju Chi clan (충주 지씨)
- Wife - Lady Yang of the Junghwa Yang clan (중화 양씨)
- Issue
  - Son - Ch'oe Kak (최각; 崔塙)
  - Son - Ch'oe Chŏng (최정; 崔埥; 1429 – 27 March 1466)
    - Daughter-in-law - Lady Yi of the Yeoheung Yi clan (여흥 이씨; 1429 – 25 March 1505)
  - Son - Ch'oe Tang (최당; 崔塘)
  - Son - Ch'oe Ŭn (최은; 崔垠)
  - Son - Ch'oe Yŏn (최연; 崔堧)
  - Daughter - Lady Ch'oe of the Haeju Ch'oe clan (해주 최씨)

== In popular culture ==
- Portrayed by Kwon Tae-won in the 2011 SBS TV series Deep Rooted Tree.
- Portrayed by Lee Dae-yeon in the 2015 MBC TV series Splash Splash Love.
- Portrayed by Ahn Shin-woo in the 2016 KBS1 TV series Jang Yeong-sil.

== See also ==
- Little China (ideology)
- Origin of Hangul
