= Gwiin Park (Sejong) =

Korean royal consort (fl. 15th century)

- Royal Consort of the Junior First Rank
- Born: after 1408; Joseon
- Died: after 1428; Joseon
- Consort of: King Sejong
- Clan: Miryang Park (by birth); Jeonju Yi (by marriage)
- Dynasty: Yi
- Father: Park Gang-saeng
- Mother: Lady, of the Papyeong Yun clan

Korean name
- Hangul: 귀인 박씨
- Hanja: 貴人 朴氏
- RR: Gwiin Bakssi
- MR: Kwiin Pakssi

Gwiin Park (Korean: 귀인 박씨; Hanja: 貴人 朴氏; birth and death dates unknown), of the Miryang Park clan, also known as Mistress Janguigung, was a consort of Sejong the Great, the fourth monarch of Joseon.

== Biography ==
=== Early life and lineage ===
Lady Park was most likely born during the reign of King Taejong, but the exact date and year of birth are unknown. Her father was Park Gang-saeng (박강생) and her mother was a lady from the Papyeong Yun clan (파평 윤씨).

Her elder brother, Park Sim-mun (박심문), would later commit suicide by ingesting poison upon hearing the news that figures such as Seong Sam-mun had been executed after their failed plot to restore King Danjong.

=== As royal consort ===
In 1424, Lady Park was selected as a royal consort of King Sejong, alongside Lady Choe (later known as Mistress Myeonguigung), the daughter of Choe Sa-ui (최사의). The following day, she was conferred the title "Mistress Janguigung" (장의궁주), (Note: Or Mistress of Jangui (Note: lit. ''dignified and exemplary'') Palace.) and her brother, Park Ui-mun (박의문), received an official appointment. In November of the same year, discussions were held about posthumously honoring Lady Park's father; Park Gang-saeng was then awarded a first rank title.

In 1425, there was an incident in which palace attendant Im Gyeong (임경) and an official serving the crown prince named Yi Se (이세) shot arrows within the palace grounds. The arrows struck the quarters of Lady Park, leading to their punishment by flogging and subsequent exile, although the original sentence was death by hanging.

In 1428, King Sejong revised the ranking system of the internal court. Subsequently, Lady Park and Lady Choe were appointed to the junior first rank (귀인; gwiin). They were the last Joseon royal consorts to use the "gungju" title (궁주; lit. ''mistress/owner of a palace'').

=== Death ===
It remains unknown when Lady Park died and where her tomb is located.

== Titles ==
- During the reign of King Taejong (r. 1400–1418):
  - Lady, of the Miryang Park clan (밀양 박씨; 密陽朴氏; from unknown date)
    - Park Gang-saeng's daughter (박강생의 딸)
    - Lady Park (박씨; 朴氏)
- During the reign of King Sejong (r. 1418–1450):
  - Mistress Janguigung (장의궁주; 莊懿宮主; from 26 November 1424), royal consort of unspecified rank
  - Gwiin (Note: lit. ''Noble Lady'') (귀인; 貴人; from 6 August 1428), royal consort of the junior first rank

== Family ==
- Father: Park Gang-saeng (박강생; 1369–1422)
- Mother: Lady, of the Papyeong Yun clan (파평 윤씨)
- Sibling(s)
  - Park Jeol-mun (박절문; 1390–1412) (Note: ▪︎Wife: Lady, of the Kaesong Wang clan (개성 왕씨); daughter of Wang Gyeok (왕격), Prince Yeongbok (영복군). ▪︎Issue: 2 sons.)
  - Park Sim-mun (박심문; 1408–1456) (Note: ▪︎Wife: Lady, of the Cheongju Han clan (청주 한씨); daughter of Han Seung-sun (한승순). ▪︎Issue: 7 sons, 1 daughter.)
  - Park Ui-mun (박의문; ?–1429) (Note: ▪︎Wife: Lady, of a certain clan (모씨). ▪︎Issue: 1 son, 3 daughters.)
  - Lady, of the Miryang Park clan (밀양 박씨)
  - Lady, of the Miryang Park clan (밀양 박씨)
  - Lady, of the Miryang Park clan (밀양 박씨)
  - Lady, of the Miryang Park clan (밀양 박씨)
- Consort of: King Sejong (세종대왕; 15 May 1397 – 8 April 1450) — No issue.

== Ancestry ==
Park Sa-gyeong (박사경)
Park Chim (박침)
Park Gang-saeng (박강생)
Park Rin (박린)
Lady, of the Miryang Park clan (밀양 박씨)
Gwiin Park
Yun Seung-gyeong (윤승경)
Lady, of the Papyeong Yun clan (파평 윤씨)

== See also ==
- History of Korea
- Styles and titles in Joseon
