= Splash Splash Love =

2015 South Korean TV series

- Promotional poster
- Hangul: 퐁당퐁당 LOVE
- RR: Pongdangpongdang LOVE
- MR: P'ongdangp'ongdang LOVE
- Genre: Fantasy; Romance; Time slip
- Written by: Kim Ji-hyun
- Directed by: Kim Ji-hyun
- Starring: Kim Seul-gi; Yoon Doo-joon
- Opening theme: 너에게 퐁당 (Splash Into You)
- Country of origin: South Korea
- Original language: Korean
- No. of episodes: 2

Original release
- Network: MBC; Naver TV Cast
- Release: December 13 – December 20, 2015

Splash Splash Love (Korean: 퐁당퐁당 LOVE; RR: Pongdangpongdang LOVE) is a South Korean television series starring Kim Seul-gi and Yoon Doo-joon. It initially aired on web platform Naver TV Cast in a 10-episode format. It was then broadcast by MBC on December 13 and 20, 2015 in two 60-minute episodes.

The series aired two years after the popular novel Moonlight Drawn by Clouds was serialized on Naver in 2013. Like Splash, Moonlight is about the love story between a cross-dressing eunuch and a monarch. The novel is the original work from which the drama Love in the Moonlight (2016) was adapted from.

== Plot ==
Danbi is a senior high school student taking the College Scholastic Ability Test (CSAT). However, she is not good at mathematics and is reluctant to take the exam. On exam day, she decides to run away and stops by a playground, where she hears a drum from a puddle of water. As she has the ability to travel through spacetime, she takes a leap of faith and jumps into the puddle of water and into the Joseon era.

In Joseon, she is mistaken for a eunuch and becomes a confidante of King Lee Do. Danbi finds that in the Joseon Dynasty, her high school level of math and science makes her the greatest scientist in the entire Kingdom. She falls in love with the King and inspires him in his goal to reform the country.

However, fearing for their own privileges, Danbi becomes the target of traditionalist courtiers who seek her death. Having a hand in saving both the King and the Queen, Danbi becomes friends with the Queen who, in order to allow the King and Danbi to be together, endorses Danbi becoming a royal consort. Presented to the Queen Dowager, who is a doppelganger of her own mother, Danbi becomes very home sick and therefore decides to return to her era. Lee accepts her decision, and they leave, heading for the beach, where they share a passionate good bye with each other before Danbi disappears into the portal in the water. When she has disappeared, Lee swears that he will find her again, no matter how long it will take.

== Cast ==
=== Main cast ===
- Kim Seul-gi as Jang Dan-bi / Jang Yeong-sil
- Yoon Doo-joon as Yi Do / King Sejong

=== Supporting cast ===
- Jin Ki-joo as So-heon (Dan-bi's friend) / Queen Soheon of the Cheongsong Shim clan
- Ahn Hyo-seop as Park Yeon / Che Ah-jin
- Ko Kyu-pil as Dan-bi's math teacher / Head Eunuch
- Lee Kwang-se
- Kim Soo-hyun
- Uhm Hye-jung
- Lee Jae-joon
- Kang Hyun
- Yoon Seok-ho as Seok (Park Yeon's younger brother)

=== Cameo ===
- Kim Kap-soo as Prime Minister Hwang Hui
- Jung Kyu-soo as Shim On
- Im Ye-jin as Dan-bi's mother / Dowager Queen Hudeok of the Yeoheung Min clan
- Lee Dae-yeon as Choe Man-ri

== Subtitle for each episode ==
Episode	Date	Subtitle	Running time
Episode 1	2015 December 10	The sweet rain falling on Joseon	13:35
Episode 2	2015 December 11	Useful Gosam	14:10
Episode 3	2015 December 12	I hate Gosam	18:37
Episode 4	2015 December 13	Gosam is in my heart	11:02
Episode 5	2015 December 14	Don't go, Gosam	18:59
Episode 6	2015 December 17	Gosam embracing the Sun	11:49
Episode 7	2015 December 18	Don't cry Gosam	16:55
Episode 8	2015 December 19	Gosam is a woman	14:53
Episode 9	2015 December 20	You are my dream	8:52
Episode 10	2015 December 21	Good luck, Danbi	24:03

== Original soundtracks ==
No.	Title	Artists	Length
1.	"Fondant to You"	Kim Hyung Joong	3:15
2.	"Don't Go"	Jung Ji-chan (One More Chance)	3:45
3.	"Fondant to You" (Violin Intro Ver.)	Remi	3:29
4.	"Fondant to You" (Violin Intro Ver.)	Kim Hyung-joong	3:31

== Ratings ==
Episode	Date	TNmS (%)	AGB Nielsen (%)
Episode	Date	Nationwide	Nationwide
1	December 13, 2015	3.5	3.3
2	December 20, 2015	3.0	2.5

== Awards and nominations ==
Year	Award	Category	Recipient	Result
2016	11th Seoul International Drama Awards	Best Actress	Kim Seul-gi	Nominated
2016	11th Seoul International Drama Awards	Best Screenwriter	Kim Ji-hyun	Nominated
2016	11th Seoul International Drama Awards	Best TV Movie	Splash Splash Love	Nominated
2016	44th International Emmy Awards	Best TV Movie / Mini-series	Splash Splash Love	Nominated
