= Nongsa chiksŏl =

1429 Korean agriculture book

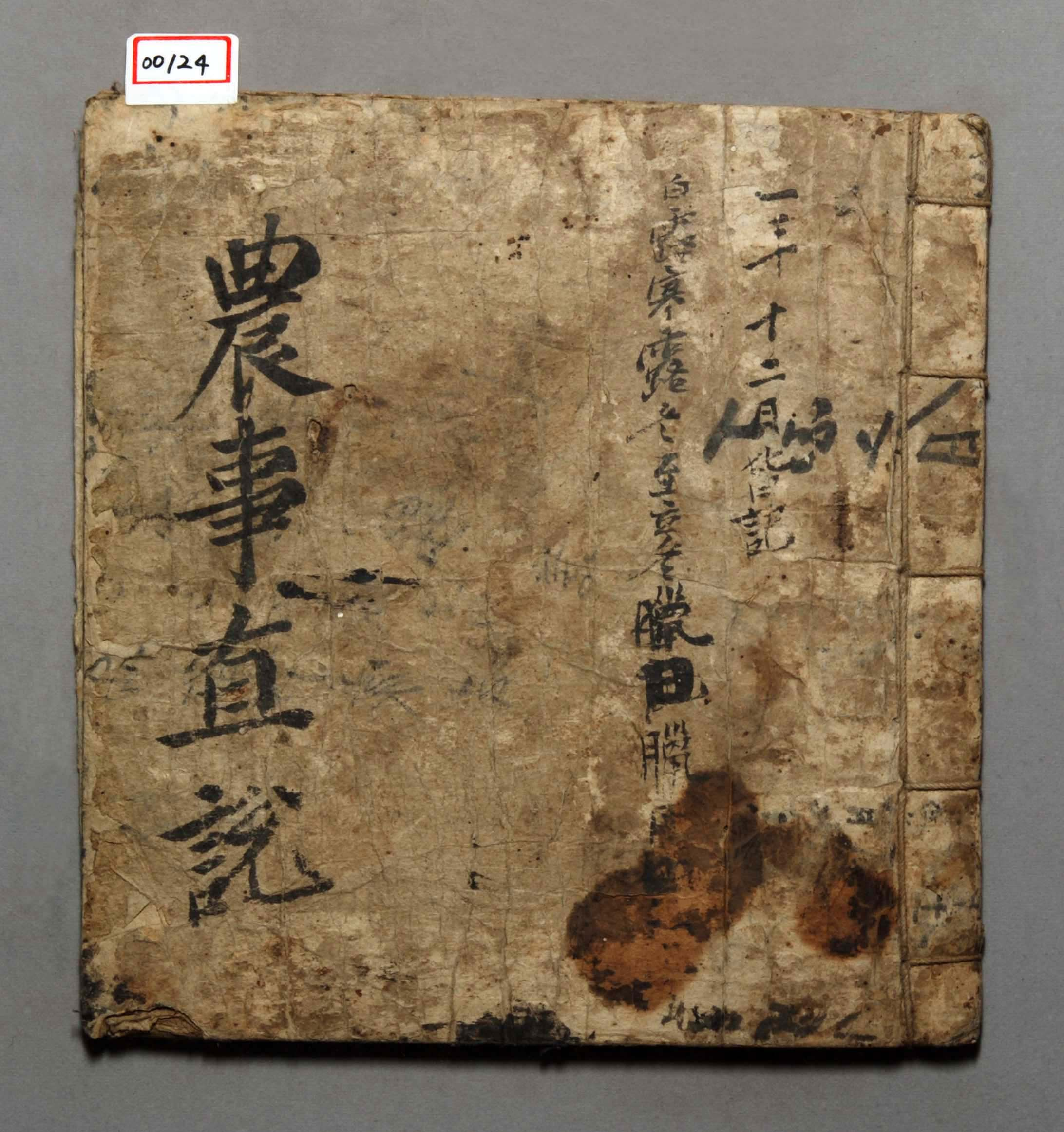
- Cover of a copy

Korean name
- Hangul: 농사직설
- Hanja: 農事直說
- RR: Nongsa jikseol
- MR: Nongsa chiksŏl

Nongsa chiksŏl (Korean: 농사직설; Hanja: 農事直說; lit. 'Straight Talk on Farming') is a Korean agricultural book written by two civil ministers (munsin), Chŏng Ch'o and Pyŏn Hyomun as ordered by Sejong the Great (r. 1418 - 1450) during the early period of Korean Joseon Dynasty (1392 – 1897).

It consists of only one volume and was published in 1429, the 11th year of the King's reign, as kwanch'an (官撰, books published by the government), and was widely distributed to regional officers of each province in the following year. From then onwards, it was published in different editions called naesabon (內賜本) in 1492, siphangbon (十行本) in 1656, and sungjŏngbon (崇禎本) in 1686. Of these, a naesabon edition was transmitted to Japan, and the book is referred to in many agricultural books, including Sallim kyŏngje ("Farm Management") and Imwŏn kyŏngjeji ("Sixteen Discourses on Rural Economy"). While the contents of Nongsa chiksŏl are mostly limited to the main grains harvested in Korea, and the descriptions are short and simple, it is the first book compiled for the Korean agricultural environment. The book was used as a guide for local kwŏnnonggwan (勸農官) officers in charge of agricultural affairs. The publiciation of the Nongsa chiksŏl was a part of King Sejong's effort to expand rice farming in Korea.

== Contents ==
Most of the contents of Nongsa chiksŏl are limited to important grains and the description is simple, but it is an example of a book compiled by farming methods suitable for the Korean climate. In addition, this not only became a guide for local farmers' halls, but also became an opportunity for the appearance of various agricultural books published one after another. As in the preface written by Jeongcho, the laws of farming are different if the climate is different, so it was not the same as the Chinese agricultural books that have already been published. Therefore, each province ordered the governor of each province to ask familiar farmers from all over the country to listen carefully, collect, print, and distribute what they had already experienced. In other words, in the past, it was difficult to change the farming method according to the climate because local leaders relied on China's old agricultural books to engage in farming.

The book contains appropriate farming methods according to the region, and it can be said that it created a good opportunity to break away from Chinese farming methods that are far from the Korean situation. The contents of this book are divided into 10 categories: Pigok (備穀) Note 3, Jigyung (Jigyeong 耕) Note 4, Jongma (Jongma 麻) Note 5, Jongdo (Jongseo 黍粟) Note 6, Jongseo (Jongseo 稷) Note 7, Jongjik 豆 (Jongdae 豆) Note 8, Jongdae Du Sodu (Jongdae 麥) Note 9, Jongma (Jongma 胡麻) Note 10, Jongoma (Jongma 蕎麥) Note 11, and Religious (稻) Note 12.

The book focuses on the cultivation of grain crops. The farming methods contained in this book include methods of growing rice: direct wave method (直播) method, 乾畓 method, and seedling method, water 稻栽培 method, and acidity method. These four rice cultivation methods were implemented in various ways depending on the environmental conditions such as the 17th week of Heavenly (候), the 17th week of Suri (利), and the land tax. In addition, ploughs, handcuffs, mirigae, bungee, rubber lae, tabi, and hoe were used as cultivated basketball, and human flour, umabun, ash strainer 25, green rain (綠肥) strainer 18, and barn manure were used as manure. As for paddy fields, the 19th week of Cheongyeong (淺耕) in spring and fall and the 20th week of Sim (深耕) in fall were encouraged. Three methods were implemented as sowing methods for field crops: Joppa (條播) week 21, Salpa (撒播) week 22, and Honpa (混播) week 23, and two years and three years and three crops, single crops, mixed crops, recesses, and intercrops were appropriately adopted as cultivation methods. The contents of Nongsa chiksŏl continued to be expanded as the editions were repeatedly revised, for example, new items such as Jodoanggi (早稻秧 base), 火耨 method 24, and cotton cultivation method were added.

== See also ==
- Chibong yusŏl
- Siŭijŏnsŏ
