= Pak Yŏn =

Korean scholar-official (1378–1458)

- Portrait of Pak Yŏn and his wife
- Born: 1378; Godang-ri, Simcheon, Yeongdong, Yanggwang Province, Goryeo
- Died: 1458 (aged 80); Gak-jeo, Gosan, Pyeonggang, Gangwon Province, Joseon
- Occupation: Musician
- Spouse: Lady Song of the Yeosan Song clan
- Children: 1. Pak Maeng-u; 2. Pak Jung-u; 3. Pak Gye-u; 4. Lady Pak; 5. Lady Pak; 6. Lady Pak; 7. Lady Pak
- Parents: Pak Cheon-seok (father); Lady Gim of the Gyeongju Gim clan (mother)
- Family: Miryang Park clan

Korean name
- Hangul: 박연
- Hanja: 朴然
- RR: Bak Yeon
- MR: Pak Yŏn

Art name
- Hangul: 난계, 송설당
- Hanja: 蘭溪, 松雪堂
- RR: Nangye, Songseoldang
- MR: Nan'gye, Songsŏltang

Courtesy name
- Hangul: 탄보
- Hanja: 坦父
- RR: Tanbo
- MR: T'anbo

Posthumous name
- Hangul: 문헌
- Hanja: 文獻
- RR: Munheon
- MR: Munhŏn

Pak Yŏn or Park Yeon (Korean: 박연; 20 August 1378 – 23 March 1458) was a government official, scholar, writer, astronomer and musician in the Early Joseon Dynasty period, who was a teacher of King Sejong. He created the armillary sphere Honcheonui, water clock Borugak Jagyeongnu, and sundial Yangbu Ilgu along with Chang Yŏngsil, as well as five basic sounds (Gung, Sang, Gak, Chi, Wu), which correspond to five consonant groups (Aeum, Seoreum, Suneum, Chieum, Hueum) in the Hunminjeongeum. He also adapted court music to the new Confucian philosophy, particularly in the concept of ye-ak, a Confucian ideology that combines ritual and music.

He petitioned the king Sejong 450 times for the necessity of tuning the then-imperfect musical instruments and compiling a collection of sheet music. He correctly tuned a pyeongyeong to the correct pitch according to 12 notes he had devised. Along with Wangsan of Goguryeo and Ureuk of Silla, Pak Yŏn is considered one of the three most popular music saints in Korea.

== Biography ==
Pak Yŏn was born into a family of government officials in 1378 in Yeongdong. When he was 15, his father died, so he spent three years at the burial site in mourning for his father. When he was 18, his mother died, so he spent another three years at his parents' tomb. Pak Yŏn received a memorial stone of filial piety from king Taejong in 1402. Soon after his father and mother died, Pak Yŏn started playing the piri. One night he saw an orchid growing between rocks and decided to adopt the pen name 'Nangye'. He passed Saengwonsi and was first in Mungwa gwageo exams at the ages of 28 and 34. He then successively filled various government posts including Jiphyeonjeon, Saganwon, Saheonbu and Sejasigangwon Munhak, where he met Chungnyeong daegun.

As soon as Sejong ascended the throne in 1418, he appointed Pak Yŏn to an agency affiliated with Yejo, which oversaw music-related affairs. Pak Yŏn organized music into three groups: aak, dangak and hyangak. Domestic production of musical instruments for aak was done under his direction.

Pak Yŏn helped Sejong make improvements in music. He contributed greatly to the completion of music during the early Joseon Dynasty by producing musical notes and pyeongyeong. The Jongmyo jerye, which includes Jeongdaeeop and Botaepyeong was composed by Pak Yŏn and is also listed in 'Nangyeyugo(蘭溪遺藁)' in 39 petitions, including the production of musical notes, the correction of the original notes, the claim to revise the axis system and the publication of music. However, in the Sejo Sillok, Jeongdaeeop and Botaepyeong is recorded as king Sejong's work.

On 22 August 1443, when Pak Yŏn was 60 years old, his position was suddenly changed from Yejo chamui(禮曹參議) to Jungchuwon busa(中樞院副使), which oversaw the palace shifts. Soon after, the king Sejong announced the creation of Hunminjeongeum on 30 December 1443. Some scholars argue Pak Yŏn, who was well versed in rhymes such as Yullyeo Sinseo(律呂新書), Hongmu Jeong-un(洪武正韻), fully understood Sasung Chil-eum(四聲七音) and appealed to king Sejong in his first petition of Nangyeyugo(蘭溪遺藁) to correct the custom and sound by teaching people the Samganghaengsil(三綱行實) and Oeumjeongseong(五音正聲), might have taught king Sejong the Korean alphabet Hangul during this period and proclaimed it in the name of king Sejong.

As soon as Pak Yŏn ascended to Yemun Daejehak in 1453, the Gyeyujeongnan Revolts broke out. Pak Gye-woo, the third son of Pak Yŏn, a Hall of Worthies scholar, was killed by a group supporting King Sejo along with other numerous loyalists for leaking Grand Prince Suyang's plan. Pak Yŏn was sent into exile at the age of 80 and died the following year. His descendants were prohibited from taking gwageo exams for 331 years until King Yeongjo awarded him an honorable title of Mun Heon in 1767.

== Family ==
- Great-Grandfather
  - Pak Sunjung (박순중; 朴純中)
- Grandfather
  - Pak Siyong (박시용; 朴時庸)
- Father
  - Pak Ch'ŏnsŏk (박천석; 朴天錫)
- Mother
  - Lady Kim of the Gyeongju Gim clan (경주 김씨)
    - Grandfather: Kim O (김오; 金珸)
- Siblings
  - Sister - Lady Pak of the Miryang Park clan (밀양 박씨)
    - Brother-in-law - Kŭm Yu (琴柔)
  - Sister - Lady Pak of the Miryang Park clan (밀양 박씨)
    - Brother-in-law - Chŏng Kan (鄭諫)
  - Sister - Lady Pak of the Miryang Park clan (밀양 박씨)
    - Brother-in-law - Pak Yŏsaeng (朴汝生)
  - Sister - Lady Pak of the Miryang Park clan (밀양 박씨)
    - Brother-in-law - Kim Porin (金寶麟))
- Wife: Lady Song of the Yeosan Song clan (정경부인 여산 송씨) – Daughter of Panseo Song Yun (송윤) and the 2nd cousin of King Sejong.
  - Son: Pak Maengu (박맹우; 朴孟愚)
  - Son: Pak Chungu (박중우; 朴仲愚)
  - Son: Pak Kyeu (박계우; 朴季愚)
  - Daughter: Lady Pak of the Miryang Park clan (밀양 박씨)
  - Daughter: Lady Pak of the Miryang Park clan (밀양 박씨)
  - Daughter: Lady Pak of the Miryang Park clan (밀양 박씨)
  - Daughter: Lady Pak of the Miryang Park clan (밀양 박씨)

== In popular culture ==
- Portrayed by Ahn Hyo-seop in the 2015 MBC TV series Splash Splash Love.
- Portrayed by Lee Geon-Myeong in the 2016 KBS1 TV series Jang Yeong-sil
- Yeo-Nak, the musical dedicated to Pak Yŏn

== Legacy ==
- The Nangye Temple in Yeongdong is named after Pak Yŏn and hosts a traditional music celebration every October
- Nangye yugo, a posthumous collection of Pak Yŏn.
- In the Nangye Museum of Traditional Music, Pak Yŏn's life and achievements are displayed in the Video Room and the Nangye Room. The Korean Music room displays wind instruments, strings, and percussion.
- Miryang Park clan
