= Kim Tam =

Joseon scientist (1416–1464)

- Hangul: 김담
- Hanja: 金淡
- RR: Gim Dam
- MR: Kim Tam

Art name
- Hangul: 무송헌
- Hanja: 撫松軒
- RR: Musongheon
- MR: Musonghŏn

Courtesy name
- Hangul: 거원
- Hanja: 巨源
- RR: Geowon
- MR: Kŏwŏn

Kim Tam (Korean: 김담; Hanja: 金淡; 1416–1464) was a Korean Joseon Dynasty politician, astronomer, and scientist. His art name was Musonghŏn (무송헌; 撫松軒). He contributed to Korean literature, geography, and Korean lunisolar calendar calculations.

== Books ==
- Musonghŏn jip (무송헌문집; 撫松軒文集)
- Collection of Lord Kim Munjŏl's Works (김문절공일고; 金文節公逸稿)
- A Collection in Astronomical Learning of Various Schools (제가역상집; 諸家曆象集)
