= Naver TV =

South Korean online video platform

- Screenshot of the homepage on July 9, 2021
- Developer: Naver
- Type: Video streaming platform; Video sharing platform
- Launched: July 12, 2012; 14 years ago
- Status: Active
- Website: tv.naver.com

Naver TV (Korean: 네이버TV; formerly Naver TV Cast) was a South Korean online video streaming and video sharing service developed and operated by Naver. The service primarily distributes web dramas and entertainment shows.

Their mobile app has been rebranded to NOW with the intention of promoting K-Culture. The website updates are expected to be rolled out in the near future.

== Original programming ==
=== Dramas ===
==== 2013 ====
- After School : Lucky Or Not
- Someday
- The Craving

==== 2014 ====
- Aftermath
- Aftermath 2
- About Love
- Vampire Flower
- Prominent Woman
- Momo Salon
- A Better Tomorrow
- Longing For Spring
- Dreaming CEO
- Missing Korea
- Love Cells
- Doll's House
- After School : Lucky Or Not 2
- One Sunny Day
- 6 Person Of Room

==== 2015 ====
- Dream Knight
- Dr. Ian
- Exo Next Door
- Midnight's Girl
- My Love Eun-Dong: The Beginning
- Prince of Prince
- We Broke Up
- Romance Blue
- I Order You
- To Be Continued
- Noble, My Love
- Drama Special - The Brothers' Summer
- Love Cells 2
- Immutable Law of First Love
- Start Love
- 9 Seconds - Eternal Time
- Investigator Alice
- Falling for Challenge
- Never Die
- The Flatterer!
- The Secret Message
- Love Detective Sherlock K
- Eating Existence
- Delicious Love
- Sweet Temptation
- High-End Crush
- Splash Splash Love

==== 2016 ====
- The Cravings 2
- Ready for Start - Vol. 1
- Choco Bank
- Devil's Diary
- Rickety Rackety Family
- Thumping Spike
- Nightmare Teacher
- Click Your Heart
- Tomorrow Boy
- The Success Story of Novice Shaman Gong
- Bong Soon, a Woman Who Dies When Loving
- After the Show Ends
- Touching You
- Spark
- Women at a Game Company
- Matching! Boys Archery
- Thumping Spike 2
- Be Positive
- The Sound of Your Heart
- My Romantic Some Recipe
- Clocking Out
- What's Up With These Kids!?
- 7 First Kisses
- Love for a Thousand More
- The Miracle
- Justice Team
- My Old Friend

==== 2017 ====
- Oppa Is Missing
- Ruby Ruby Love
- Three Color Fantasy - The Universe's Star
- 109 Strange Things
- Three Color Fantasy - Romance Full of Life
- Trace of the Hand
- Three Color Fantasy - Queen of the Ring
- How Are U Bread
- Girl's War
- Mask
- The Boy Next Door
- Seventeen
- Idol Fever
- Moment
- I am...
- Irish Uppercut
- Hip Hop Teacher
- Someone Noticeable
- Somehow 18
- Magic School
- Devil Inspector
- My Beautiful Laundrette
- Oh! Goddesses of Doll-like Beauty
- Last Minute Romance
- The Blue Sea
- We Are Peaceful Brothers
- 29gram
- Romance Special Law
- Listen To Her Heart
- Unexpected Heroes
- The Best Time to Quit a Company
- All The Love In This World

==== 2018 ====
- A-Teen

==== 2019 ====
- A-Teen 2
- IN SEOUL
- The Guilty Secret
- Dear My Name
- 4 Reasons Why I Hate Christmas

==== 2020 ====
- XX
- The Temperature of Language: Our Nineteen
- The World of My 17
- My Boss Is A Million YouTube
- Ga Doo Ri's Sushi Restaurant
- IN SEOUL Season 2
- Another Peaceful Day of Second-Hand Items

==== 2021 ====
- Blue Birthday
- So I Married the Anti-fan
