= Jang Hee-ryung =

South Korean actress and model

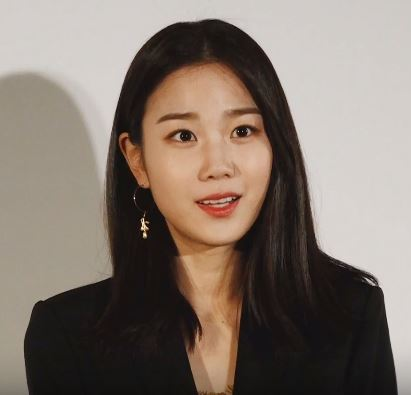
- Jang in March 2019
- Born: November 11, 1993 (age 32); Sacheon, South Korea
- Other name: Jang Hui-ryoung
- Occupations: Actress; model
- Years active: 2014–present
- Agent: Ghost Studio

Korean name
- Hangul: 장희령
- RR: Jang Huiryeong
- MR: Chang Hŭiryŏng

Jang Hee-ryung (Korean: 장희령; born November 11, 1993) is a South Korean actress and model. She is best known for starring in web series, notably Dream Knight (2015), 72 Seconds (2015), and The Boy Next Door (2017).

== Career ==
In 2014, Jang appeared in commercials for SK Telecom, and it was revealed that she was a trainee in JYP Entertainment's acting division in preparation for her acting debut.

In 2019, Following JYP Entertainment jointly managed its actor division with Npio Entertainment, Jang terminated the contract by agreement and joined Studio Santa Claus Entertainment.

In 2023, Jang joined Ghost Studio.

== Filmography ==
=== Film ===
| Year | Title | Role | Notes | Ref. |
|---|---|---|---|---|
| 2015 | The Chosen: Forbidden Cave | Journalist | Cameo appearance | |
| 2015 | Alice: Crack of Season | Yoon-hye | Short film | |
| 2017 | A Stray Goat | Soo-jung | | |
| 2020 | Untact | | Short film | |
| 2023 | Swallow | young Eun-suk | | |

=== Television series ===
| Year | Title | Role | Notes | Ref. |
|---|---|---|---|---|
| 2015 | Dream Knight | Ji-soo | | |
| 2015 | 72 Seconds | | | |
| 2015 | Falling for Challenge | Ki Yeo-woon | | |
| 2016 | Breaking Kihong! | | | |
| 2016 | Uncontrollably Fond | Jang Man-ok | | |
| 2016 | Mo-Min's Room | Lee Mo-min | | |
| 2016 | Entourage | Herself | Cameo appearance | |
| 2017 | Three Color Fantasy: "Romance Full of Life" | Kim Tae-yi | | |
| 2017 | The Boy Next Door | Kang Min-ah | | |
| 2017 | The Happy Loner | Ye-Jin | | |
| 2017 | Children of the 20th Century | Jang Ji-hye | | |
| 2018 | Wok of Love | Lee Bun-hong | | |
| 2018 | Priest | Kim Yoo-ri | | |
| 2021 | Drama Stage: "Deok Goo is Back" | Heo Soon-jeong | | |
| 2021 | Uncle | Jang Yeon-joo | | |
| 2022 | Shooting Stars | Baek Da-hye | | |
| 2022 | Poong, the Joseon Psychiatrist | Hyo-yeon | Cameo appearance | |
| 2024 | Sorry not Sorry | Ahn Chan-yang | | |
| 2025 | The Witch | Heo Eun-sil | | |
| 2026 | The Judge Returns | Kim Ga-young | Guest appearance | |

=== Web series ===
| Year | Title | Role | Ref. |
|---|---|---|---|
| 2022 | Connect | Lee Sun Hee | |

=== Music video appearances ===
| Year | Title | Artist | Ref. |
|---|---|---|---|
| 2014 | "I'm…" | Bernard Park | |
| 2014 | "Before the Rain" | Bernard Park | |
| 2015 | "Congratulations" | Day6 | |
| 2017 | "You Were Beautiful" | Day6 | |
| 2018 | "Missing You" | Buzz | |
| 2020 | "The Reason" | Seo J feat. Lee Sang-gon of Noel | |

== Awards and nominations ==
| Year | Award | Category | Nominated work | Result |
|---|---|---|---|---|
| 2015 | 1st K-Model Awards | CF Model Award | —N/a | Won |
| 2015 | 1st KWeb Fest | Best Rising Star | Dream Knight | Won |
| 2016 | 2nd KWeb Fest | Best Actress | 72 Seconds | Nominated |
| 2017 | Seoul Webfest Awards | Best Supporting Actress | The Boy Next Door | Won |
