= Kang Ki-young =

South Korean actor (born 1983)

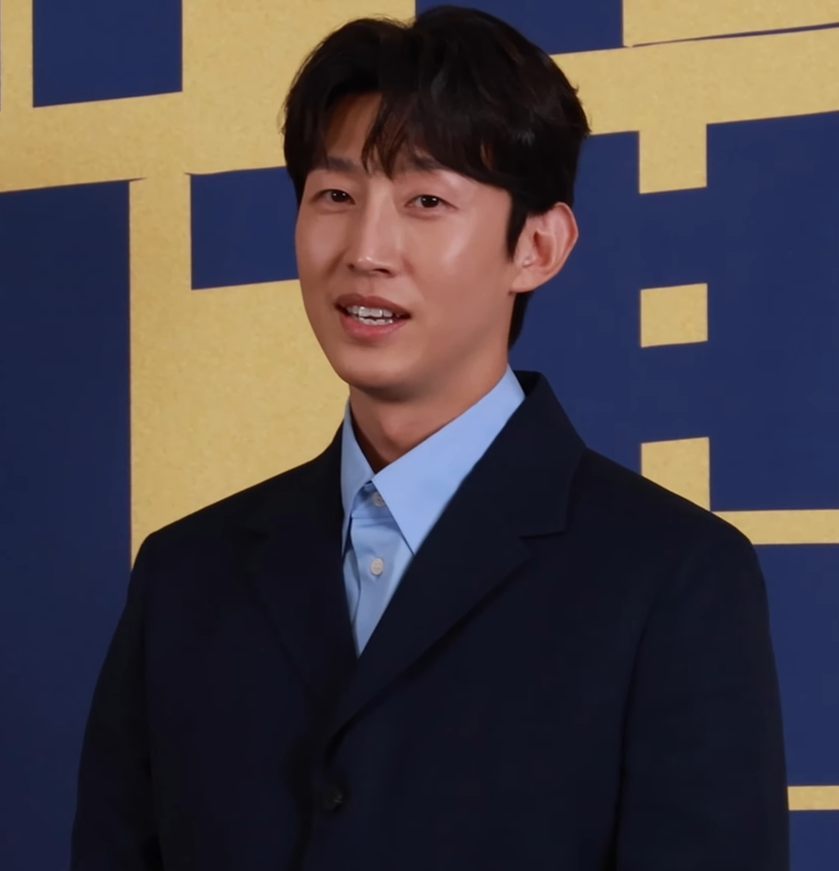
- Kang in January 2024
- Born: October 14, 1983 (age 42); Incheon, South Korea
- Other name: Kang Gi-yeong
- Education: University of Suwon (Department of Theatre and Film)
- Occupation: Actor
- Years active: 2009–present
- Agent: Namoo Actors
- Spouse: Unknown (m. 2019)
- Children: 1

Korean name
- Hangul: 강기영
- RR: Gang Giyeong
- MR: Kang Kiyŏng

Kang Ki-young (Korean: 강기영; born October 14, 1983) is a South Korean actor. He is well-known for his supporting roles in a number of popular Korean dramas.

== Filmography ==
=== Film ===
Year	Title	Role	Ref.
2017	Daddy You, Daughter Me	Joo Jang-won	
2017	The Mayor	Mobile phone repair technician	
2018	The Puzzle	Choi Yong-goo	
2018	On Your Wedding Day	Ok Geun-nam	
2019	Exit	Manager Goo	
2019	Crazy Romance	Byung-chul	
2021	The Book of Fish	Lee Kang-hwe	
2023	The Point Men	Qasim / Lee Bong-han	
2023	Our Season	Guide	
2026	Wild Sing	Na Tae-poong	
2026	Reawaken Man: The Red	Young-ha	

=== Television series ===
Year	Title	Role	Notes	Ref.
2012	The King's Doctor	Horse Doctor	Bit part (episode 11–12, 26)	
2014	High School King of Savvy	Jo Duk-hwan		
2014	The Three Musketeers	Ba-rang		
2014	Reset	Section chief		
2014	Love Frequency 37.2			
2015	Shine or Go Crazy	Wang Poong		
2015	Oh My Ghost	Heo Min-soo		
2015	Six Flying Dragons	Lee Bang-won's valet		
2016	Puck!	Ace player on university ice hockey team		
2016	Come Back Mister	Jegal Gil		
2016	Bring It On, Ghost	Choi Chun-sang		
2016	W	Kang Suk-bum		
2016	Weightlifting Fairy Kim Bok-joo	Kim Dae-ho		
2017	Three Color Fantasy – Romance Full of Life	Jo Ji-sub	one act-drama	
2017	Three Color Fantasy – Queen of the Ring	Fashion show manager	Bit Part (ep.5)	
2017	Tunnel	Song Min-ha		
2017	Queen for Seven Days	Jo Kwang-oh		
2017	While You Were Sleeping	Kang Dae-hee	Cameo (episode 9–13)	
2017	I'm Not a Robot	Hwang Yoo-chul		
2018	What's Wrong with Secretary Kim	Park Yoo-sik		
2018	Familiar Wife	Park Yoo-sik	Cameo (episode 13)	
2018	My Secret Terrius	Kim Sang-ryeol		
2019	At Eighteen	Oh Han-kyeol		
2022	Extraordinary Attorney Woo	Jung Myeong-seok		
2023	The Uncanny Counter	Hwang Pil-kwang	Season 2	
2024	Queen of Divorce	Dong Ki-joon		

=== Television shows ===
Year	Title	Role	Notes	Ref.
2018–2019	Village Survival, the Eight	Cast member	Season 1–2	
2020	Run	Cast member		
2021	Petkage	Host		

== Awards and nominations ==
Name of the award ceremony, year presented, category, nominee of the award, and the result of the nomination
Award ceremony	Year	Category	Nominee / Work	Result	Ref.
Baeksang Arts Awards	2023	Best Supporting Actor – Television	Extraordinary Attorney Woo	Nominated	
Baeksang Arts Awards	2023	Best Supporting Actor – Film	The Point Men	Nominated	
Blue Dragon Film Awards	2019	Best Supporting Actor	Crazy Romance	Nominated	
Buil Film Awards	2019	Best Supporting Actor	Exit	Nominated	
Buil Film Awards	2023	Best Supporting Actor	The Point Men	Nominated	
Chunsa Film Art Awards	2020	Best Supporting Actor	Crazy Romance	Nominated	
Global Film & Television Huading Awards	2023	Best Global Teleplay Supporting Actor	Extraordinary Attorney Woo	Nominated	
Grand Bell Awards	2020	Best Supporting Actor	Crazy Romance	Nominated	
Grand Bell Awards	2023	Best Supporting Actor	The Point Men	Nominated	
Korea Best Star Awards	2019	Best Supporting Actor	Exit	Won	
Korea Drama Awards	2019	Excellence Award, Actor	At Eighteen	Won	
MBC Drama Awards	2018	Best Supporting Actor in a Wednesday-Thursday Drama	My Secret Terrius	Won	
MBC Drama Awards	2018	Bromance Award	Kang Ki-young (with So Ji-sub and Son Ho-jun); My Secret Terrius	Won	
