= Weightlifting Fairy Kim Bok-joo =

2016 South Korean television series

- Promotional poster
- Hangul: 역도요정 김복주
- RR: Yeokdo yojeong Gim Bokju
- MR: Yŏkto yojŏng Kim Pokchu
- Genre: Sports; Coming-of-age; Rom-com
- Created by: Han Hee
- Written by: Yang Hee-seung
- Directed by: Oh Hyun-jong
- Starring: Lee Sung-kyung; Nam Joo-hyuk; Lee Jae-yoon; Kyung Soo-jin
- Composers: Kim Joon-suk; Jung Se-rin
- Country of origin: South Korea
- Original language: Korean
- No. of episodes: 16

Production
- Executive producers: Oh Min-soo; Kim Sang-heon
- Cinematography: Lee Jin-duk; Kim Sun-chul; Park Hwa-jin
- Editor: Oh Sere-na
- Camera setup: Single camera
- Running time: 60 minutes
- Production company: Chorokbaem Media

Original release
- Network: MBC TV
- Release: November 16, 2016 – January 11, 2017

Weightlifting Fairy Kim Bok-joo (Korean: 역도요정 김복주) is a 2016–2017 South Korean television series starring Lee Sung-kyung in the title role, with Nam Joo-hyuk. It is a coming-of-age sports drama, inspired by the life of Olympic gold-medalist Jang Mi-ran. It aired on MBC every Wednesday and Thursday at 22:00 (KST) from November 16, 2016, to January 11, 2017.

The series resonated with the young demographic; although it averaged 4.6% in audience share and received the lowest viewership ratings in its time-slot throughout its run, it gained a cult following among young viewers and received mostly favorable reviews.

== Synopsis ==
Kim Bok joo (Lee Sung-Kyung), a young woman chasing her dream of weightlifting on an athletics college campus, develops a crush on her friend Jung Joon-Hyung's (Nam Joo-Hyuk) older brother, Jung Jae-Yi (Lee Jae-Yoon). At first, Joon Hyung teases her and goes along with her act, even helping her, but soon finds himself falling in love with her. This series is a coming-of-age story about a group of college athletes who are fighting for their dreams, experiencing and finding love in the process, and growing every step of the way.

== Cast ==
=== Main ===
- Lee Sung-kyung as Kim Bok-joo (김복주)

A naturally gifted weightlifter with an ambitious and outgoing personality who attends a sports university. Growing up with her father, who was a former weightlifter, she is inspired to follow in his footsteps. She stands up for herself and her friends. She does not hesitate to beat people up if they provoke her. She hides her insecurities and fragile heart under her strong exterior. At first, she experiences a one-sided love with Jung Jae-yi but later falls in love with his brother/cousin Jung Joon-hyung.

- Nam Joo-hyuk as Jung Joon-hyung (정준형)

He is a talented swimmer with a playful personality who attends the same university as Bok-joo. He and Bok-joo were childhood friends when they were in elementary school. At first, when they meet again at the university, they do not recognize each other, until an incident occurs that refreshes their memories. He is raised by his kind aunt and uncle after his mother leaves him behind and moves to Canada, where she starts a second family. Joon-hyung suffers from trauma and during tournaments often suffers a panic attack and makes a false start leading to him getting disqualified. He enjoys teasing Bok-joo, but gradually falls in love with her.

- Lee Jae-yoon as Jung Jae-yi (정재이)

Joon-hyung's cousin and ersatz older brother, with a kind and gentle personality. A former athlete who becomes an obesity doctor due to an injury. He becomes Bok-joo's first love (without him realizing it) after he kindly lends her his umbrella on the street, even though at the time she is a complete stranger, and she enrolls in his obesity clinic so that she can meet him, although her need as a weightlifter is to put on weight rather than losing it. He treats Bok-joo like a younger sister and generally shows support to his brother's decision to like and date Bok-joo.

- Kyung Soo-jin as Song Shi-ho (송시호)

Bok-joo's roommate and Joon-hyung's ex-girlfriend. She still has feelings for him and initially becomes jealous of his and Bok-joo's strong relationship, leading her to expose Bok-joo's secret trips to Jae-yi's clinic to Bok-joo's father and coaches at one point. After Bok-joo saves her life and sent her to the hospital on time, her relationship between her and Bok-joo and Joon-hyung gradually improves. She is a top-class rhythmic gymnast, who won a silver medal at the Asian Games at the age of eighteen, but she returns to the sports university due to a decline in her performance. Shi-ho is an overachiever and is under constant stress about her weight and skills, which led to her breakup with Joon-hyung, a psychiatric eating disorder and her acting rashly in various situations.

=== Supporting ===
==== Weightlifting team ====
- Cho Hye-jung as Jung Nan-hee (정난희), despite her strength is a very feminine girl who dreams of romance and always willing to spread happiness.
- Lee Joo-young as Lee Seon-ok (이선옥), is direct, loves to eat, and does not show much affection but is loyal to her friends. She eventually "demonstrates" some potential interest in Tae-Kwon.
- Choi Moo-sung as Yoon Deok-man (윤덕만), Professor/Coach
- Jang Young-nam as Choi Sung-eun (최성은), Coach
- Oh Eui-shik as Bang Woon-ki (방운기), the Team Captain who had a newborn child with his girlfriend
- Lee Bit-na as Bitna (빛나), Bok-joo's junior
- Moon Ji-yoon as Sang Chul (상철)
- Jo Mi-nyeo
- Yoo Joon-hong
- Noh Yeong-joo
- Lee Ye-bin

==== Swimming team ====
- Ji Il-joo as Jo Tae-Kwon, the very friendly and silly roommate of Joon-hyung who eventually shows some interest in Seon-ok.
- Kim Jae-hyun as Kim Jae-hyun
- Kim Woo-hyuk as Kim Woo-hyuk

Joon-hyung's junior. He has a habit of dating women, then ghosting them, and thus is hated by all his female peers.

- Choi Woong as Kim Gi-seok

Joon-hyung's senior. He has a crush on Shi-ho and treats Joon-hyung with a gruffer demeanor.

- Lee Ji-hoon
- Kim Nam-woo
- Kwon Hyuk-beom

==== Rhythmic gymnastics team ====
- Cho Soo-hyang as Soo-bin

A rising star collegiate rhythmic gymnast who competes with Shi-ho.

- Ray Yang as Sung Yoo-hwi, Coach
- Lee Seul
- Oh Ha-nee as Rhythmic gymnast
- Kim Yoo-ji
- Jung Yoo-jin

==== People around Bok-joo ====
- Ahn Gil-kang as Kim Chang-gul

Bok-joo's father, a former weightlifter who owns a fried chicken restaurant

- Kang Ki-young as Kim Dae-ho

Bok-joo's uncle, a part-time aspiring actor who works at the restaurant

==== People around Joon-hyung ====
- Jung In-gi as Joon-hyung's paternal uncle and foster father
- Lee Jung-eun as Joon-hyung's paternal aunt and foster mother

=== Extended ===
- Yoo Da-in as Go Ah-young

A doctor at the Hanwool College of Physical Education. She has a crush on Jae-yi.

- Park Won-sang as Psychotherapist
- Kim Yoon-ji
- Kim Chae-eun
- Kim Cha-kyung
- Seo Wang-seok
- Kim Hyun-jung as Dormitory's house mistress
- Jung Hyun-seok as Dormitory's house mistress
- Park Jung-min
- Park Gun-lak
- Lee Joon-hee
- Lee Suk-jin
- Lim Seo-jung
- Yoo Yeong-bin
- Lim Uk-jin
- Lim Geun-seo
- Jung Soo-in
- Seo Kwang-jae
- Choi Nam-wook
- Tae Won-seok
- Heo Min-kang
- Jeon Ji-ahn

=== Special appearances (Cameo) ===
- Yoon Jin-hee as Weightlifting contestant (Ep. 1)
- Kim Jae-hyun as Joonhyung's minion (Ep.2)
- Lee Jong-hwa as Choi Tae-hoon (Ep. 1, 15)
- Lee Soo-ji as Ku Seul (Ep. 1)
- Lee Jong-suk as Jong-suk, Chicken Restaurant Customer and archery athlete (Ep. 2)
- Yoon Yoo-sun as Kim Jung-yeon, Joon-hyung's biological mother (Ep. 6, 14–15)
- Shin A-young as announcer
- Ahn Il-kwon
- Noh Woo-jin
- Ji Hye-ran as Song Shi-eon, Shi-ho's sister (Ep. 8–9, 13)
- Ji Soo as Bok-joo's fellow worker (Ep. 11)
- Seohyun as Hwan-hee, Jae-yi's ex-girlfriend (Ep. 12)
- Min Sung-wook as Sang-goo (Ep. 12)
- Kim Seul-gi as Seul-gi, supermarket employee (Ep. 15)
- Byeon Woo-seok as Joon-Hyung's senior (Ep. 16)

== Production ==
The series is written by Yang Hee-seung of the 2015 romantic comedies Oh My Ghostess and High School King of Savvy; and directed by PD Oh Hyun-joong of 7th Grade Civil Servant. The first script reading took place in August 2016 at MBC broadcasting station in Sangam, Seoul, South Korea.

== Original soundtrack ==
Weightlifting Fairy Kim Bok Joo OST

Soundtrack album by Various artists
- Recorded: 2016
- Genre: Soundtrack
- Languages: Korean; English
- Labels: KT Music; Star entry entertainment

=== OST Part 1 ===
Released on November 16, 2016
No.	Title	Artist	Length
1.	"You & I"	Kim Jong-wan (Nell)	3:37
2.	"You & I" (Inst.)		3:37
Total length:			7:14

=== OST Part 2 ===
Released on November 23, 2016
No.	Title	Artist	Length
1.	"From Now On" (앞으로)	Kim Min-seung	3:33
2.	"From Now On" (Inst.)		3:33
Total length:			7:06

=== OST Part 3 ===
Released on November 30, 2016
No.	Title	Artist	Length
1.	"Dreaming" (꿈꾼다)	Han Hee-jung	4:02
2.	"Dreaming" (Inst.)		4:02
Total length:			8:04

=== OST Part 4 ===
Released on December 7, 2016
No.	Title	Artist	Length
1.	"Somehow" (왠지 요즘)	J.Mi (Lush)	3:25
2.	"Somehow" (Inst.)		3:25
Total length:			6:50

=== OST Part 5 ===
Released on December 8, 2016
No.	Title	Artists	Length
1.	"I'll Pick You Up" (데리러 갈게)	Standing Egg	3:45
2.	"I'll Pick You Up" (Inst.)		3:45
Total length:			7:30

=== OST Part 6 ===
Released on December 14, 2016
No.	Title	Artist	Length
1.	"Permeate" (스르륵)	Lee Hae-in	3:37
2.	"Permeate" (Inst.)
Total length:			7:14

=== OST Part 7 ===
Released on November 15, 2016
No.	Title	Artist	Length
1.	"Again Again Again" (또또또)	Lee Jin-ah	2:24
2.	"Again Again Again" (Inst.)		2:24
Total length:			4:48

=== OST Part 8 ===
Released on December 29, 2016
No.	Title	Artist	Length
1.	"Is It Love?" (사랑인걸까?)	Ahn Hyun-jung	3:30
2.	"Is It Love?" (Inst.)		3:30
Total length:			7:50

Disc 2:
No.	Title	Artist	Length
1.	"Weightlifting fairy kim bok joo" (Opening Title)	Various Artists	2:10
2.	"A New Beginning"	Various Artists	2:06
3.	"A Mischievous Triangle"	Various Artists	2:42
4.	"A Strange Pink Atmosphere"	Various Artists	2:11
5.	"'Bok Joo' Is Love"	Various Artists	2:34
6.	"Boyfriend vs Girlfriend"	Various Artists	2:07
7.	"Bok Joo's Family Chicken Restaurant"	Various Artists	1:57
8.	"Comfort"	Various Artists	2:18
9.	"Clear"	Various Artists	3:11
10.	"Can You Keep the Secret?"	Various Artists	1:59
11.	"Do You Like... MESSI?"	Various Artists	2:11
12.	"Forgotten Dream"	Various Artists	2:13
13.	"From gurl to woman"	Various Artists	3:22
14.	"Her Bucket List"	Various Artists	2:16
15.	"Keep Missing You"	Various Artists	1:40
16.	"Lost"	Various Artists	3:01
17.	"Lovely Day"	Various Artists	2:32
18.	"Mom's Postcard"	Various Artists	2:51
19.	"Naughty One-Sided Love"	Various Artists	1:47
20.	"On That Day, We...."	Various Artists	3:10
21.	"Obesity Clinic?"	Various Artists	1:56
22.	"See You Again, Kkung!"	Various Artists	2:06
23.	"Smiley"	Various Artists	2:08
24.	"Same Heart, Different Dream"	Various Artists	4:04
25.	"Sorry, I Can't Protect You"	Various Artists	1:50
26.	"Sly"	Various Artists	2:07
27.	"Road of Mind"	Various Artists	2:22
28.	"Toads and Coins"	Various Artists	2:46
29.	"Trauma"	Various Artists	2:08
30.	"Twenty Years Old"	Various Artists	2:04
31.	"That's How You Became an Adult"	Various Artists	2:39
32.	"The Beginning of Flutter"	Various Artists	1:35
33.	"What??"	Various Artists	1:55
34.	"Weightlifting Department of Haneol P. E College"	Various Artists	2:30

== Ratings ==
Average TV viewership ratings
Ep.	Broadcast date	Average audience share			
Ep.	Broadcast date	TNmS		AGB Nielsen	
Ep.	Broadcast date	Nationwide	Seoul	Nationwide	Seoul
1	November 16, 2016	4.1% (NR)	4.1% (NR)	3.3% (NR)	3.6% (NR)
2	November 17, 2016	5.0% (NR)	5.2% (NR)	3.3% (NR)	3.5% (NR)
3	November 23, 2016	4.8% (NR)	5.3% (NR)	4.4% (NR)	4.9% (NR)
4	November 24, 2016	4.9% (NR)	5.2% (NR)	4.6% (NR)	4.9% (NR)
5	November 30, 2016	4.8% (NR)	4.9% (NR)	4.4% (NR)	4.5% (NR)
6	December 1, 2016	4.5% (NR)	5.3% (NR)	4.6% (NR)	5.4% (NR)
7	December 7, 2016	4.4% (NR)	5.3% (NR)	4.8% (NR)	5.7% (NR)
8	December 8, 2016	4.6% (NR)	4.6% (NR)	5.4% (NR)	5.5% (NR)
9	December 14, 2016	4.2% (NR)	4.4% (NR)	4.1% (NR)	4.4% (NR)
10	December 15, 2016	4.8% (NR)	5.3% (NR)	5.1% (NR)	5.6% (NR)
11	December 21, 2016	4.7% (NR)	5.2% (NR)	4.4% (NR)	4.6% (NR)
12	December 22, 2016	5.1% (NR)	5.3% (NR)	4.5% (NR)	4.7% (NR)
13	December 28, 2016	5.5% (NR)	6.3% (NR)	5.0% (NR)	5.8% (NR)
14	January 4, 2017 (Note: Episode 14 didn't air as scheduled (Thursday, December 29) due to MBC Entertainment Awards.)	5.0% (NR)	5.9% (NR)	5.4% (NR)	6.3% (NR)
15	January 5, 2017	5.5% (NR)	6.4% (20th)	5.4% (NR)	5.8% (NR)
16	January 11, 2017	5.4% (NR)	5.5% (NR)	5.2% (NR)	5.3% (NR)
Average		4.8%	5.3%	4.6%	5.0%
In the table below, the blue numbers represent the lowest ratings and the red numbers represent the highest ratings.; NR denotes that the drama did not rank in the top 20 daily programs on that date.

== Awards and nominations ==
Year	Award	Category	Recipient	Result
2016	35th MBC Drama Awards	Excellence Award, Actress in a Miniseries	Lee Sung-kyung	Won
2016	35th MBC Drama Awards	Best New Actor	Nam Joo-hyuk	Won
2016	35th MBC Drama Awards	Best Couple Award	Nam Joo-hyuk and Lee Sung-kyung	Nominated
