= Yoon Shi-yoon =

South Korean actor (born 1986)

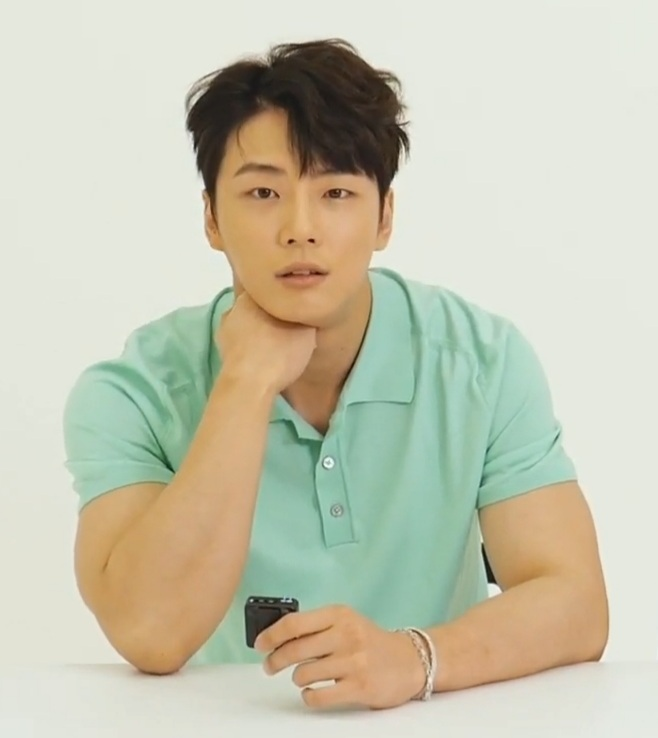
- Yoon in August 2020
- Born: Yoon Dong-gu; September 26, 1986 (age 40); Suncheon, Jeollanam-do, South Korea
- Education: Kyonggi University, Majoring Arts
- Occupation: Actor
- Years active: 2009–present
- Agent(s): R&C Entertainment

Korean name
- Hangul: 윤시윤
- Hanja: 尹施允
- RR: Yun Siyun
- MR: Yun Siyun

Former name
- Hangul: 윤동구
- Hanja: 尹東久
- RR: Yun Donggu
- MR: Yun Tonggu

Yoon Shi-yoon (Korean: 윤시윤; born Yoon Dong-gu on September 26, 1986), also known professionally as Yun Si Yun, is a South Korean actor and television personality. He is best known for his leading roles in Bread, Love and Dreams (2010), My Cute Guys (2013), Hit the Top (2017), Grand Prince (2018) and Your Honor (2018), Nokdu Flower (2019), Psychopath Diary (2019–2020), and Train (2020). From 2016 to 2019, he was a member of the third season of variety show 2 Days & 1 Night.

== Early life ==
Yoon was born in a small town in Suncheon as Yoon Dong-gu, a name he used until an official change of name upon his entry into college. He is the only child of his family, and was raised by his grandparents. At the time, while peers of his age went to kindergarten and learned English, Yoon went to seodang, a traditional school that taught Confucianism, and learned to read Hanja (Chinese characters). Yoon's unique childhood was then unveiled through his song "Grandpa's Bicycle" for Barefooted Friends.

== Career ==
=== 2009–2010: Rising popularity and breakthrough ===
Yoon debuted in the daily sitcom High Kick Through the Roof and rose to fame for his role as a semi-rebellious teenager. He was nominated for Best New Actor in TV at the Baeksang Arts Awards, and won MBC's Best Couple award with his co-star Shin Se-kyung.

The following year, Yoon was cast as the main character in the slice-of-life television series Bread, Love and Dreams. The drama's writer, Kang Eun-kyung, saw Yoon in High Kick Through the Roof and picked him for the role. The series was one of the most watched shows in South Korea in 2010 with a final episode viewership rating of 50.8%; and Yoon became a household name in Korea. Due to the drama's popularity, Yoon and co-star Lee Young-ah were named promotional ambassadors for North Chungcheong Province.

The same year, Yoon had his first big screen debut with a leading role in the horror movie Death Bell 2: Bloody Camp.

Yoon appeared in a commercial for the cellphone Bubi Bubi with the famous girl group T-ara. He also sung 4 singles for the soundtrack of the commercial.

=== 2011–2014: Leading roles ===
In 2011, Yoon was cast to replace Kim Jaewon, who withdrew after suffering from multiple injuries on the first day of filming, in the romantic-comedy Me Too, Flower!. He played a millionaire masquerading as a parking attendant and entering into relationship with an abrasive female police officer (Lee Ji-ah). However, the drama scored low viewership ratings and had to be pre-empted.

In 2012, Yoon starred in the Japanese web drama Brand Guardians, based on a story about a Korean youth who travels to Japan to make it as a fashion stylist. The project was orchestrated by the JAFIC (Japan Apparel-Fashion Industry Council) to increase awareness of Japanese fashion. He then filmed his first Chinese drama Happy Noodles. On December 8, Yoon won the Popular Star Prize in China at the 2012 Asia Top 10 Popular Star Awards by CETV.

In 2013, he starred in the cable series My Cute Guys, the third installment of tvN 's "flower boy" series. Yoon plays a genius game developer, who accidentally enters the life of a modern Rapunzel (played by Park Shin-hye). The series was the highest sold cable drama ever to Japan. Yoon then became a cast member of Barefooted Friends, which was his first variety show. In October, Yoon was cast in KBS's romantic comedy series Prime Minister & I alongside Lee Beom-soo and Girls' Generation's Yoona. He lent his voice for the animated movie Doraemon: Nobita's Secret Gadget Museum.

In 2014, Yoon starred opposite Yeo Jin-goo in the film Mr. Perfect, where he plays a professional golfer who loses everything but later becomes a golf coach.

=== 2016–present: Comeback from military service ===
After completing military service, Yoon starred in JTBC's historical fantasy drama Secret Healer, playing Joseon's famous doctor Heo Jun. The drama is a fictional story about a young Heo Jun and his journey to lift a curse for a princess (played by Kim Sae-ron), whom he later fell in love with. In May 2016, he became a regular cast member of the third season of popular variety show 2 Days & 1 Night.

In October 2016, Yoon was cast in a three-episode miniseries, Romance Full of Life, which is part of MBC's 9-episode miniseries, Three Color Fantasy. The drama premiered in March 2017. The same year, Yoon starred in KBS2's youth drama Hit the Top.

In 2018, Yoon starred in the historical romance melodrama Grand Prince. The series was a ratings success becoming the highest rated TV Chosun drama since the network's establishment in 2011. He next starred in the legal drama Your Honor, playing double roles as a judge and convict. Yoon play as a twin named Han Kang-ho and Han Soo-ho. Han Soo-ho is a top judge who is very attached to personal belongings, meanwhile Han Kang-ho is a five-time convicted criminal who takes over his twin's job after his brother mysteriously disappears. In the same year Yoon was cast in the film Private Woman alongside Kim Yoon-hye. Yoon will play the role of a man who has a big scar on his heart and sentimental memories from his relationship with his first love.

In 2019, Yoon starred in historical drama Nokdu Flower. In the same year, Yoon starred in tvN's comedy thriller drama, Psychopath Diary. Yoon plays a naive and pushover stockbroker, who begins to believe he is a psychopathic murderer after an accident which results in amnesia and the discovery of a diary in his possession. He did voice acting for the animated movie Paboos (2019) as Doctor Flag and also in another animated movie Bakugan:Battle Force (2019) as Enemy 1.

In 2020, Yoon starred in OCN's action-romance drama, Train. Yoon plays a dual role as Seo Do-Won, a police officer on the path of atonement in universe "A" and a senior police inspector who has chosen the path of corruption in universe "B".

== Personal life ==
Yoon is an avid lover of books. It is stated that he possesses over 2,000 books at home.

=== Military service ===
On April 28, 2014, Yoon secretly enlisted into the Republic of Korea Marine Corps. Yoon had previously expressed his desire to enlist secretly, in order to avoid harming other soldiers. On January 27, 2016, Yoon completed his military service.

== Filmography ==
=== Film ===
Year	Title	Role	Ref.
2010	Death Bell 2: Bloody Camp	Kwan-woo	
2014	Mr. Perfect	Baek Se-jin	
2022	Birth	Kim Dae-geon	
2023	Love My Scent	Chang-soo	

=== Television series ===
Year	Title	Role	Notes	Ref.
2009–2010	High Kick Through the Roof	Jung Jun-hyuk		
2010	Bread, Love and Dreams	Kim Tak-gu		
2010	Once Upon a Time In Saengchori	Park Shi-yoon	Cameo	
2011	Me Too, Flower!	Seo Jae-hee		
2011–2012	High Kick: Revenge of the Short Legged	Yoon Shi-yoon	Cameo (Episode 88)	
2012	Brand Guardians	Ha Woo-joo		
2013	Flower Boys Next Door	Enrique Geum		
2013	Happy Noodles	Xiu Can		
2013–2014	Prime Minister & I	Kang In-ho		
2016	My Horrible Boss	New recruit Yoon Shi-yoon	Cameo (Episode 16)	
2016	Secret Healer	Heo Jun		
2017	Three Color Fantasy - Romance Full of Life	So In-sung		
2017	Hit the Top	Yoo Hyun-jae		
2018	Smashing on Your Back	Yoon Shi-yoon	Cameo (Episode 44)	
2018	Grand Prince	Lee Hwi / Prince Eun Sung		
2018	Your Honor	Han Soo-ho / Han Kang-ho		
2019	Nokdu Flower	Baek Yi-hyun / Ogre / Oni		
2019	My Absolute Boyfriend	Yoon Shi-yoon	Cameo (Episode 2)	
2019	Psychopath Diary	Yook Dong-sik		
2020	Train	Seo Do-won		
2022	It's Beautiful Now	Lee Hyun-jae		
2025	Taxi Driver 3	Cha Byeong-jin	Ep 3–4	
2025	Young Kim Dae-geon	Kim Dae-geon		

=== Web series ===
Year	Title	Role	Notes	Ref.
2021	You Raise Me Up	Do Yong-sik		
2021–2023	Work Later, Drink Now	Han Woo-Joo / Mr. Nice Paper	Cameo (Season 1); Supporting role (Season 2)	

=== Television shows ===
Year	Title	Role	Notes	Ref.
2012	Fanfare of the Little Band	Narration		
2013	Barefooted Friends	Main cast		
2016–2019	2 Days & 1 Night	Main cast		
2017	Your Big Question	Presenter		
2018	Law of the Jungle in Sabah	Cast member		
2019	Dating DNA Laboratory X	Main MC		
2020	Heart Signal	Panelist	Season 3	
2021	Falling for Korea - Transnational Couples 2	Host	with Kim Won-hee	

=== Hosting ===
Year	Title	Notes	Ref.
2013	KBS Song Festival	with Bae Suzy and Lee Hwi-jae	
2018	Dream Concert	with Seol In-ah and Cha Eun-woo	
2018	2018 KBS Entertainment Awards	with Shin Hyun-joon and Seolhyun	
2023	Suncheon Bay International Garden Expo	with Jung Chae-yeon	

=== Music video appearances ===
Year	Title	Artist	Ref.
2009	"Lonely Voyage"	Kim Dong-ryool	
2010	"I Promise You"	Park Hyo-shin	
2017	"Still There"	Shin Hye-sung	

== Discography ==
=== Soundtrack appearances ===
Song title	Year	Album	Ref.
"The Road to Me"	2010	High Kick Through The Roof OST	
"Only You"	2010	Bread, Love and Dreams OST	
"I want to Date You "	2013	My Cute Guys OST	
"Grandpa's Bicycle" (ft Juniel, Tablo)	2013	Barefooted Friends My Song, My Story	
"Say it" (J2, with Hong Kyung-min)	2017	Hit the Top OST	

=== Singles ===
Song title	Year	Album	Ref.
"You Are Just Like the Spring"	2018	Non-album single	
"I Will Tell You"	2018	Non-album single	
"Downhill"	2018	Non-album single	

== Accolades ==
=== Awards and nominations ===
Name of the award ceremony, year presented, category, nominee of the award, and the result of the nomination
Award ceremony	Year	Category	Nominee / Work	Result	Ref.
APAN Star Awards	2018	Excellence Award, Actor in a Miniseries	Grand Prince	Nominated	
APAN Star Awards	2022	Top Excellence Award, Actor in a Serial Drama	It's Beautiful Now	Nominated	
Asia Model Awards	2025	Asia Special Award (Actor)	Yoon Shi-yoon	Won	
Asia Top 10 Popular Star Awards	2012	Top Ten Asian Stars	Yoon Shi-yoon	Won	
Baeksang Arts Awards	2010	Best New Actor – Television	High Kick Through the Roof	Nominated	
Baeksang Arts Awards	2011	Best Actor – Television	Bread, Love and Dreams	Nominated	
KBS Drama Awards	2010	Excellence Award, Actor in a Special Project/Serial Drama	Bread, Love and Dreams	Won	
KBS Drama Awards	2010	Best New Actor	Bread, Love and Dreams	Nominated	
KBS Drama Awards	2010	Best Couple Award	Yoon Shi-yoon (with Lee Young-ah); Bread, Love and Dreams	Won	
KBS Drama Awards	2022	Top Excellence Award, Actor	It's Beautiful Now	Nominated	
KBS Drama Awards	2022	Excellence Award, Actor in a Serial Drama	It's Beautiful Now	Won	
KBS Drama Awards	2022	Best Couple Award	Yoon Shi-yoon (with Bae Da-bin); It's Beautiful Now	Won	
KBS Entertainment Awards	2016	Rookie Award in Variety	2 Days & 1 Night	Won	
KBS Entertainment Awards	2018	Top Entertainer Award	2 Days & 1 Night	Won	
KBS Entertainment Awards	2018	Excellence Award in a Variety	2 Days & 1 Night	Nominated	
Korea Drama Awards	2010	Best New Actor	Bread, Love and Dreams	Won	
Korean Culture and Entertainment Awards	2010	Popularity Award, Actor	Bread, Love and Dreams	Won	
Korean Entertainment Culture Awards	2010	Grand Prize (TV)	Bread, Love and Dreams	Won	
MBC Entertainment Awards	2009	Best New Actor in Comedy/Sitcom	High Kick Through the Roof	Nominated	
MBC Entertainment Awards	2009	Best Couple Award	Yoon Shi-yoon (with Shin Se-kyung); High Kick Through the Roof	Won	
SBS Drama Awards	2018	Excellence Award, Actor in a Wednesday-Thursday Drama	Your Honor	Won	
SBS Drama Awards	2019	Excellence Award, Actor in a Mid-length Drama	Nokdu Flower	Nominated	
SBS Drama Awards	2025	Scene Stealer Award	Taxi Driver 3	Won	
SBS Entertainment Awards	2025	Excellence Award, Male Entertainer Category (Reality)	My Little Old Boy	Won	

=== Listicles ===
Name of publisher, year listed, name of listicle, and placement
Publisher	Year	Listicle	Placement	Ref.
Forbes	2011	Korea Power Celebrity	12th	
