= Cho Soo-hyang =

South Korean actress (born 1991)

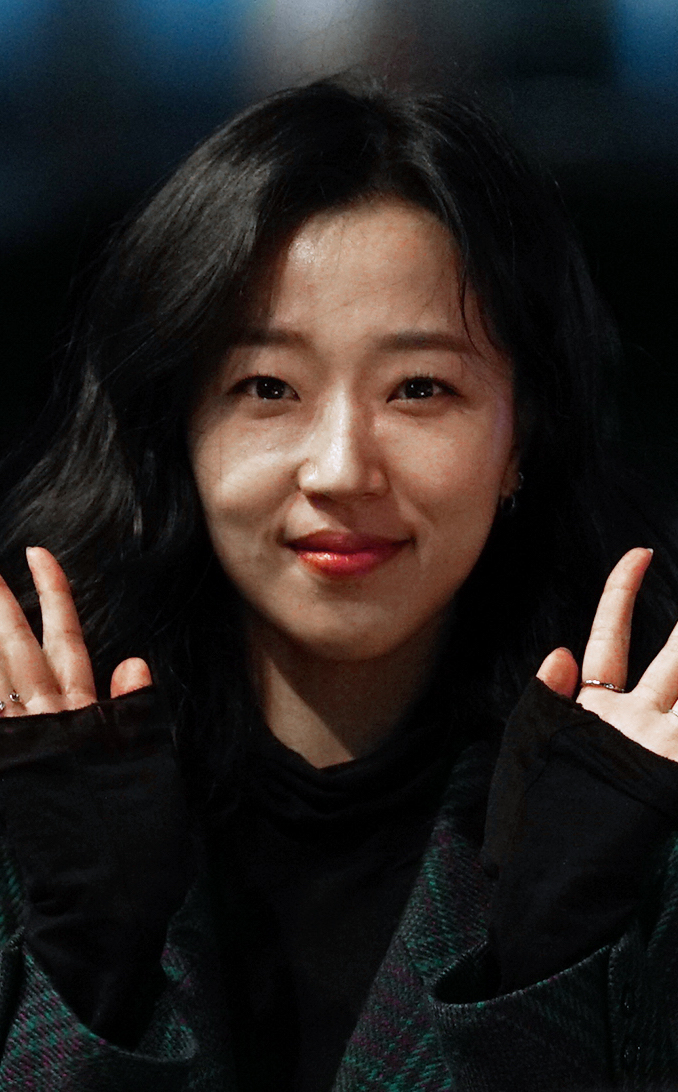
- Cho in 2019
- Born: January 21, 1991 (age 35); Seongdong District, Seoul, South Korea
- Other name: Jo Soo-hyang
- Education: Dongguk University; Anyang Arts High School
- Occupations: Actress; model
- Years active: 2002–present
- Agent: HB Entertainment

Korean name
- Hangul: 조수향
- Hanja: 曺秀香
- RR: Jo Suhyang
- MR: Cho Suhyang

Cho Soo-hyang (Korean: 조수향; born January 21, 1991) is a South Korean actress.

== Career ==
Cho Soo-hyang won Actress of the Year Award for her role in the film Wild Flowers (2015) at the 19th Busan International Film Festival in 2014.

She is noted for her performance in the Korean drama Who Are You: School 2015 (2015).

== Filmography ==
=== Film ===
Year	Title	Role
2006	See You After School	Child
2009	Men without Women	Bo-young
2013	Breathe Me (short film)	Ah-young
2014	The Way Home	Jo-soo
2015	Coin Locker Girl	Leukemia child's mother
2015	Wild Flowers	Soo-hyang
2015	The Priests	Agnes
2015	We Will Be Ok	Fellow junior student (cameo)
2016	Kissing Cousins	Ye-ji
2016	Nothing Happened	Jun-hee
2017	Snowy Road	Jang Eun-soo
2017	Microhabitat	Min-ji
2017	Coffee Noir: Black Brown	Joo-won
2018	The Princess and the Matchmaker	Man-yi
2018	Fantasy of the Girls	Jeong Soo-yeon
2019	Juror 8	Oh Soo-jeong
2020	Honest Candidate	Shin Ji-sun
2022	The Contorted House	Lee Eun-young

=== Television series ===
Year	Title	Role
2015	Snowy Road	Jang Eun-soo
2015	Who Are You: School 2015	Kang So-young
2015	Drama Special: "What is the Ghost Doing?"	Cha Moo-rim
2016	Weightlifting Fairy Kim Bok-joo	Soo-bin
2017	Three Color Fantasy – Romance Full of Life	Wang So-ra
2017	Duel	Park Seo-jin
2017	Drama Stage: "Assistant Manager Park's Private Life"	Lee Yoo-rin
2017	Queen of the Ring	Girlfriend with a ring (episode 21)
2018	Something in the Rain	Joon Hee's friend (episode 6)
2018	Top Management	Cho Soo-hyang (episode 14)
2019	The Tale of Nokdu	Kim Ssook
2022	Love All Play	Lee Young-shim
2022	Love Is for Suckers	Kang Chae-ri

=== Music video appearances ===
Year	Title	Artist
2015	"Mansae"	Seventeen

== Awards and nominations ==
Year	Award	Category	Nominated work	Result
2014	19th Busan International Film Festival	Actress of the Year Award	Wild Flowers	Won
2015	8th Korea Drama Awards	Best New Actress	Who Are You: School 2015	Nominated
2015	KBS Drama Awards	Best New Actress	Who Are You: School 2015	Nominated
