= Saturday Night Live Korea =

2011 South Korean television series

- Also known as: SNL Korea
- Hangul: 새터데이 나이트 라이브 코리아
- RR: Saeteodei naiteu raibeu Koria
- MR: Saet'ŏdei nait'ŭ raibŭ K'oria
- Genre: Sketch comedy; Comedy; Variety; Stand-up comedy
- Created by: Lorne Michaels
- Directed by: Ahn Sang-hwi; Yoo Sung-mo; Kwon Sung-wook
- Creative directors: Song Chang-ui (Season 4); Jang Jin (Season 1, 2, 3)
- Presented by: Shin Dong-yup (de facto)
- Starring: (see cast)
- Narrated by: Kim Goo; (Season 1); Lee Sang-hoon; (Season 2,3); Kang Su-jin; (Season 3~)
- Opening theme: SNL theme song by Common Ground
- Ending theme: SNL theme song by Common Ground
- Country of origin: South Korea
- Original language: Korean
- No. of seasons: 17 (9 seasons on TVN, 8 seasons on Coupang Play)
- No. of episodes: 277 (list of episodes)

Production
- Executive producers: Lorne Michaels; Jennifer Danielson
- Producer: Kim Sung-han
- Production locations: Multi-studio of CJ E&M Broadcasting Center, Digital Media City, Seoul, South Korea
- Running time: 90 minutes, including adverts Saturdays at 20:00 (KST)
- Production companies: CJ E&M (2011–2017); AStory (2021–2023); CP Entertainment (2024–present); Broadway Video; SNL Studios

Original release
- Network: tvN
- Release: 3 December 2011 – 18 November 2017
- Network: Coupang Play
- Release: 4 September 2021 – present

Related
- Saturday Night Live; Saturday Night Live UK

Saturday Night Live Korea (SNLK), also known as SNL Korea (Korean: SNL코리아), is a South Korean late-night live television sketch comedy and variety show. It is adapted from the long-running American TV show Saturday Night Live by NBC, and the show's executive producers are Lorne Michaels and Jennifer Danielson from SNL Studios and Broadway Video, which licenses the format. Originally broadcast by generalist cable network tvN, the weekly program ran from 3 December 2011 to 18 November 2017, and aired on Saturdays at 22:50 KST. In 2021, the format was revived by Coupang Play, and the show premiered on the streaming platform on 4 September 2021, at 22:00 KST.

== History ==
=== Season one ===
Written and directed by filmmaker and playwright Jang Jin, the show was officially announced on November 24, 2011, at a roundtable press conference in Cheongdam-dong. The original cast was composed of 17 members: Jang Jin, Ahn Young-mi, Lee Han-wi, Jung Woong-in, Kim Bin-woo, Jang Young-nam, Kim Won-hae, Lee Hae-young, Lee Chul-min, Lee Sang-hoon, Park Joon-seo, Kim Ji-young, Kim Ji-kyung, Min Seo-hyun, Han Seo-jin, Ko Kyung-pyo, and Kim Seul-gi. The premiere episode on December 3, 2011, was hosted by actor Kim Joo-hyuk.

Then-showrunner and head writer Jang Jin spoke about the difficulties in recruiting guests, saying "When you're offering a film, you give them a script, ask them how it is and if they say no, say that's good and turn around, but to get people to appear in this show, I had to beg. I even asked them to appear on the show by giving them my next movie script." The first season ran from December 3, 2011, to January 21, 2012, for eight episodes.

=== Season two ===
The second season ran from May 26 to July 14, 2012, for eight episodes. The cast members were Jang Jin, Lee Han-wi, Kim Won-hae, Kang Sung-jin, Jang Young-nam, Jung Sung-ho, Kim Min-kyo, Lee Sang-hoon, Jung Myung-ok, Kang Yu-mi, Im Hye-young, Park Sang-woo, Ahn Young-mi, Kwon Hyeok-su, Ko Kyung-pyo, and Kim Seul-gi.

=== Season three ===
The third season ran from September 8 to November 15, 2012, for seventeen episodes. The cast members were Jang Jin, Shin Dong-yup, Kim Won-hae, Jung Sung-ho, Park Sang-woo, Kim Min-kyo, Jung Myung-ok, Lee Sang-hoon, Oh Cho-hee, Jang Yoon-seo, Son Bo-min, Seo Yu-ri, Han Seo-jin, Kwon Hyeok-su, Ko Kyung-pyo, and Kim Seul-gi.

=== Season four ===
The fourth season ran from February 2 to November 23, 2013, for 38 episodes.

Jay Park and Park Eun-ji joined as regular cast members (they had both previously hosted in season 3). Meanwhile, Jang Jin, Ko Kyung-pyo, and Oh Cho-hee exited the program. The season 4 cast members were Shin Dong-yup, Kim Won-hae, Lee Sang-hoon, Ahn Young-mi, Kim Min-kyo, Kim Seul-gi, Jung Sung-ho, Jung Myung-ok, Kwon Hyeok-su, Park Sang-woo, Seo Yu-ri, Lee Byung-jin, Jin Won, Jay Park, and Park Eun-ji. New cast additions later in the season were Choi Il-gu, Yoo Se-yoon, 2EYES, and Clara. Jin Won exited the show on episode 18, and Kim Seul-gi did the same on episode 24.

Directors Ahn Sang-hee, Baek Seung-ryong, Kim Min, and Yoo Sung-mo are described them as "SNL Korea's F4."

=== Season five ===
The fifth season ran on March 1, 2014, to November 29, 2014, for 35 episodes.

Narsha and Seo Eun-kwang (BtoB) joined as regular cast members, while Clara exited the program. Weekend Update was discontinued, and replaced by a mini-talk show hosted by You Hee-yeol.

=== Season six ===
The sixth season started on February 14, 2015, and stopped on June 20, 2015, for a temporary hiatus for the airing of The Genius: Grand Final. It resumed on September 19, 2015, and ran until December 19, 2015.

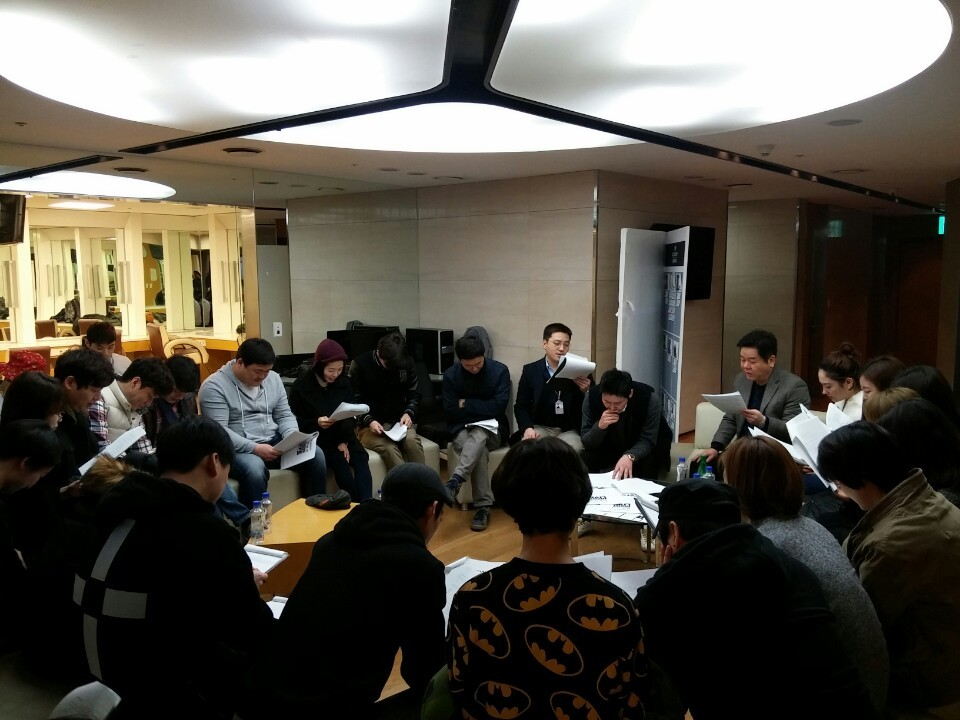
Shim Hyung-rae, Shin Dong-yup, et al., cast meeting, February 21, 2015

=== 2021 revival ===
On February 17, 2021, NBCUniversal Formats and Broadway Video Enterprise announced that SNL Korea would have a new season, produced this time by AStory. The series aired on Coupang Play later in the same year.

== Cast members ==
=== Current members ===
No.	Member(s)	Season(s)	Episode(s)
1	Ahn Young-mi	1	1–8
1	Ahn Young-mi	2	1–8
1	Ahn Young-mi	4	1–38
1	Ahn Young-mi	5	1–35
1	Ahn Young-mi	6	1–32
1	Ahn Young-mi	7	1–18
1	Ahn Young-mi	8	1–17
1	Ahn Young-mi	9	1–33
1	Ahn Young-mi	Reboot 1	1–10
1	Ahn Young-mi	Reboot 2	1–20
1	Ahn Young-mi	Reboot 3	1–10
1	Ahn Young-mi	Reboot 5	1–10
1	Ahn Young-mi	Reboot 6	1–10
1	Ahn Young-mi	Reboot 7	1–10
1	Ahn Young-mi	Reboot 8	
2	Jung Yi-rang	2	1–8
2	Jung Yi-rang	3	1–17
2	Jung Yi-rang	4	1–38
2	Jung Yi-rang	5	1–20
2	Jung Yi-rang	6	1–32
2	Jung Yi-rang	7	1–18
2	Jung Yi-rang	8	1–17
2	Jung Yi-rang	9	1–33
2	Jung Yi-rang	Reboot 1	1–10
2	Jung Yi-rang	Reboot 2	1–20
2	Jung Yi-rang	Reboot 3	1–10
2	Jung Yi-rang	Reboot 4	1–9
2	Jung Yi-rang	Reboot 5	1–10
2	Jung Yi-rang	Reboot 6	1–10
2	Jung Yi-rang	Reboot 7	1–10
2	Jung Yi-rang	Reboot 8	
3	Kim Min-kyo	2	1–8
3	Kim Min-kyo	3	1–17
3	Kim Min-kyo	4	1–38
3	Kim Min-kyo	5	1–35
3	Kim Min-kyo	7	1–18
3	Kim Min-kyo	8	1–17
3	Kim Min-kyo	9	1–33
3	Kim Min-kyo	Reboot 1	1–10
3	Kim Min-kyo	Reboot 2	1–20
3	Kim Min-kyo	Reboot 3	1–10
3	Kim Min-kyo	Reboot 4	1–9
3	Kim Min-kyo	Reboot 5	1–10
3	Kim Min-kyo	Reboot 6	1–10
3	Kim Min-kyo	Reboot 7	1–10
3	Kim Min-kyo	Reboot 8	
4	Jung Sung-ho	2	1–8
4	Jung Sung-ho	3	1–17
4	Jung Sung-ho	4	1–38
4	Jung Sung-ho	5	1–35
4	Jung Sung-ho	6	1–32
4	Jung Sung-ho	7	1–18
4	Jung Sung-ho	8	1–17
4	Jung Sung-ho	9	1–33
4	Jung Sung-ho	Reboot 3	1–10
4	Jung Sung-ho	Reboot 4	1–9
4	Jung Sung-ho	Reboot 5	1–10
4	Jung Sung-ho	Reboot 6	1–10
4	Jung Sung-ho	Reboot 7	1–10
4	Jung Sung-ho	Reboot 8	
5	Kwon Hyuk-soo	2	1–8
5	Kwon Hyuk-soo	3	1–17
5	Kwon Hyuk-soo	4	1–38
5	Kwon Hyuk-soo	5	1–35
5	Kwon Hyuk-soo	6	1–32
5	Kwon Hyuk-soo	7	1–18
5	Kwon Hyuk-soo	8	1–17
5	Kwon Hyuk-soo	9	1–33
5	Kwon Hyuk-soo	Reboot 1	1–10
5	Kwon Hyuk-soo	Reboot 2	1–20
5	Kwon Hyuk-soo	Reboot 3	1–10
5	Kwon Hyuk-soo	Reboot 4	1–9
5	Kwon Hyuk-soo	Reboot 5	1–10
5	Kwon Hyuk-soo	Reboot 6	1–10
5	Kwon Hyuk-soo	Reboot 7	1–10
5	Kwon Hyuk-soo	Reboot 8	
6	Shin Dong-yup	3	1–17
6	Shin Dong-yup	4	1–38
6	Shin Dong-yup	5	1–35
6	Shin Dong-yup	6	1–32
6	Shin Dong-yup	7	1–18
6	Shin Dong-yup	8	1–17
6	Shin Dong-yup	9	1–33
6	Shin Dong-yup	Reboot 1	1–10
6	Shin Dong-yup	Reboot 2	1–20
6	Shin Dong-yup	Reboot 3	1–10
6	Shin Dong-yup	Reboot 4	1–9
6	Shin Dong-yup	Reboot 5	1–10
6	Shin Dong-yup	Reboot 6	1–10
6	Shin Dong-yup	Reboot 7	1–10
6	Shin Dong-yup	Reboot 8	
7	Jung Sang-hoon	4	29–38
7	Jung Sang-hoon	5	1–35
7	Jung Sang-hoon	6	1–32
7	Jung Sang-hoon	7	1–18
7	Jung Sang-hoon	8	1–17
7	Jung Sang-hoon	9	1–33
7	Jung Sang-hoon	Reboot 1	1–10
7	Jung Sang-hoon	Reboot 2	1–20
7	Jung Sang-hoon	Reboot 3	1–10
7	Jung Sang-hoon	Reboot 4	1–9
7	Jung Sang-hoon	Reboot 5	1–10
7	Jung Sang-hoon	Reboot 6	1–10
7	Jung Sang-hoon	Reboot 7	1–10
7	Jung Sang-hoon	Reboot 8	
8	Lee Soo-ji	Reboot 1	1–10
8	Lee Soo-ji	Reboot 2	1–20
8	Lee Soo-ji	Reboot 3	1–10
8	Lee Soo-ji	Reboot 4	1–9
8	Lee Soo-ji	Reboot 5	1–10
8	Lee Soo-ji	Reboot 6	1–10
8	Lee Soo-ji	Reboot 7	1–10
8	Lee Soo-ji	Reboot 8	
9	Kim Won-hoon	Reboot 2	11–20
9	Kim Won-hoon	Reboot 3	1–10
9	Kim Won-hoon	Reboot 4	1–9
9	Kim Won-hoon	Reboot 5	1–10
9	Kim Won-hoon	Reboot 6	1–10
9	Kim Won-hoon	Reboot 7	1–10
9	Kim Won-hoon	Reboot 8	
10	Ji Ye-eun	Reboot 3	1–10
10	Ji Ye-eun	Reboot 4	1–9
10	Ji Ye-eun	Reboot 5	1–10
10	Ji Ye-eun	Reboot 6	1–10
10	Ji Ye-eun	Reboot 7	1–10
10	Ji Ye-eun	Reboot 8	
11	Kim Kyu-won	Reboot 5	1–10
11	Kim Kyu-won	Reboot 6	1–10
11	Kim Kyu-won	Reboot 7	1–10
11	Kim Kyu-won	Reboot 8	
12	Ahn Ju-mi	Reboot 8	
13	Lee A-ra	Reboot 8	
14	Jung Hee-soo	Reboot 8	
15	Jung Chang-hwan	Reboot 8	

Musical theme of the opening and closing, and between segments, are performed by the band Common Ground.

=== Former members ===
No.	Member(s)	Season(s)	Episode(s)
1	Jang Jin	1	1–8
1	Jang Jin	2	1–8
1	Jang Jin	3	1–17
2	Jang Young-nam	1	1–8
2	Jang Young-nam	2	1–8
3	Jung Woong-in	1	1–8
4	Kim Bin-woo	1	1–8
5	Lee Hae-young	1	1–8
6	Kim Seul-gi	1	1–8
6	Kim Seul-gi	2	1–8
6	Kim Seul-gi	3	1–17
6	Kim Seul-gi	4	1–25
7	Min Seo-hyun	1	1–8
8	Park Joon-seo	1	1–8
9	Kim Jie-gyung	1	1–8
10	Kim Won-hae	1	1–8
10	Kim Won-hae	2	1–8
10	Kim Won-hae	3	1–17
10	Kim Won-hae	4	1–38
11	Lee Chul-min	1	1–8
12	Lee Han-wi	1	1–8
12	Lee Han-wi	2	1–8
13	Kim Jie-young	1	1–8
14	Lee Sang-hoon	1	1–8
14	Lee Sang-hoon	2	1–8
14	Lee Sang-hoon	3	1–17
14	Lee Sang-hoon	4	1–38
15	Han Seo-jin	1	1–8
15	Han Seo-jin	3	1–10
16	Ko Kyung-pyo	1	1–8
16	Ko Kyung-pyo	2	1–8
16	Ko Kyung-pyo	3	1–17
17	Kang Yu-mi	2	1–8
17	Kang Yu-mi	6	1–32
17	Kang Yu-mi	7	1–18
18	Kang Sung-jin	2	1–8
19	Im Hye-young	2	1–8
20	Park Sang-woo	2	1–8
20	Park Sang-woo	3	1–17
20	Park Sang-woo	4	19–38
21	Oh Cho-hee	3	1–17
22	Jang Yoon-seo	3	1–17
23	Son Bo-min	3	1–17
24	Seo Yu-ri	3	1–17
24	Seo Yu-ri	4	1–38
24	Seo Yu-ri	5	1–35
25	Jay Park	4	1–38
25	Jay Park	5	1–35
25	Jay Park	6	1–22
26	Park Eun-ji	4	1–5
27	Lee Byeong-jin	4	1–5
28	Jin Won	4	1–18
29	Choi Il-goo	4	8–25
30	2EYES	4	19–38
31	Clara	4	20–38
32	You Hee-yeol	4	27–38
32	You Hee-yeol	5	1–20
33	Ryu Hye-lin	4	33–38
34	Narsha	5	1–35
34	Narsha	6	1–18
35	Han Jae-suk	5	1–35
35	Han Jae-suk	6	1–32
35	Han Jae-suk	7	1–18
36	Seo Eunkwang	5	1–10
37	Kim Du-young	5	1–35
37	Kim Du-young	6	1–32
38	Kim Tae-hee	5	1–35
39	Leah Kim Thompson (LEAH)	5	15–35
39	Leah Kim Thompson (LEAH)	6	1–32
40	Jung Yeon-joo	6	1–32
40	Jung Yeon-joo	7	1–18
41	Ko Won-hee	6	1–22
42	Hwang Seung-eon	6	19–25
43	Lee Hae-woo	6	19–32
44	Kim Hye-jun	7	1–18
45	Song Won-seok	7	1–18
46	Yewon	7	1–18
47	Lee Won-seok	7	1–4
48	Kim Poong	7	1–4
49	Tak Jae-hoon	8	1–17
50	Lee Soo-min	8	1–17
51	Lee Myung-hoon	8	1–17
52	Kim So-hye	8	1–17
53	Sim So-young	9	1–16
54	Yoo Se-yoon	4	8–38
54	Yoo Se-yoon	5	1–35
54	Yoo Se-yoon	6	1–32
54	Yoo Se-yoon	7	1–18
54	Yoo Se-yoon	8	1–17
54	Yoo Se-yoon	9	1–33
55	Lee Se-young	5	13–35
55	Lee Se-young	6	1–32
55	Lee Se-young	7	1–18
55	Lee Se-young	8	1–17
55	Lee Se-young	9	1–33
56	Kim Jun-hyun	6	1–32
56	Kim Jun-hyun	7	1–18
56	Kim Jun-hyun	8	1–17
56	Kim Jun-hyun	9	1–33
57	Jang Do-yoon	8	1–17
57	Jang Do-yoon	9	1–33
58	Shin Hye-jeong	9	1–33
59	Kang-yoon	9	1–33
60	Kim Hyeon-ju	9	1–33
61	Jang Do-yeon	9	17–33
62	Cha Chung-hwa	Reboot 1	1–10
62	Cha Chung-hwa	Reboot 2	1–20
63	Kim Min-soo	Reboot 1	1–10
64	Wendy	Reboot 1	1–10
65	Jung Hyuk	Reboot 1	1–10
65	Jung Hyuk	Reboot 2	1–20
65	Jung Hyuk	Reboot 3	1–10
65	Jung Hyuk	Reboot 4	1–9
66	Kim Sang-hyup	Reboot 1	1–10
66	Kim Sang-hyup	Reboot 2	1–20
67	Joo Hyun-young	Reboot 1	1–10
67	Joo Hyun-young	Reboot 2	1–20
67	Joo Hyun-young	Reboot 3	1–10
67	Joo Hyun-young	Reboot 4	1–9
68	Lee So-jin	Reboot 1	1–10
68	Lee So-jin	Reboot 2	1–20
69	Solbin	Reboot 2	1–20
70	Moonbin	Reboot 2	4–20
71	Kim Ah-young	Reboot 3	1–10
71	Kim Ah-young	Reboot 4	1–9
71	Kim Ah-young	Reboot 5	1–10
71	Kim Ah-young	Reboot 6	1–10
72	Nam Hyun-woo	Reboot 3	1–10
72	Nam Hyun-woo	Reboot 4	1–9
73	Yoon Ga-yi	Reboot 4	1–9
73	Yoon Ga-yi	Reboot 5	1–10
74	Yoo Hee-joon	Reboot 5	1–10
75	Ahn Do-gyu	Reboot 5	1–10
76	Seo Hye-won	Reboot 6	1–10
77	Choi So-yeon	Reboot 6	1–10
78	Cha Kyung-eun	Reboot 7	1–10
79	Cho Min-kyung	Reboot 7	1–10
80	Momoko Arata	Reboot 7	2–8, 10

== Format and segments ==
The Korean version follows a similar format as the American version, with a host, cast members and several skits for each episode.

- Weekend Update: News sketch that reviews the week's social, economic, and cultural issues. Anchored by Jang Jin in Seasons 1–3.
  - Wise Search for Life (슬기로운 탐구생활): This pre-recorded sub-segment of Weekend Update satirizes each week's most talked-about headlines and events. Voice narration by Kim Seul-gi.
  - Dispatch SNL (출동 SNL): This live-skit is also a sub-segment of WU, and includes interviews by its correspondent Kwon Hyeok-su.
  - SNL Invitation (SNL 초대석): This live-skit, also a sub-segment of WU, involves a person (usually the episode's host, or sometimes a cast member) in a fake or actual situation related to the week's best-known events.
- SNL Digital Short: Comedic and musical pre-recorded "video shorts" which are performed by SNLK cast members and hosts each week (usually one or two per episode). Their most popular shorts are their Grand Theft Auto parodies, ranging from the Joseon period to modern military.
- Lee Oung-don PD's Eatable X-File: Since the latter episodes of season 3, each week Shin Dong-yup (in the role of Production Director Lee Oung-don [이엉돈 PD]) takes 3 or 4 kinds of food from the hands of other cast members for fun, to judge whether it's suitable to eat or not, then runs away quickly. It is a parody of Channel A's infotainment program Lee Yeong-don PD's Eatable X-File.
- Sa-gwa Shilup (사과실업): This is an occasional skit that adopts a business presentation style, for advertising peculiar products. Moderated by Shin Dong-yup, while wearing clothes and make-up similar to Apple co-founder Steve Jobs.

== Ratings ==
The season finale of season two, broadcast on July 14, 2012, was hosted by boy band Super Junior, which was the first non-music program they appeared in as part of the promotion for their sixth studio album Sexy, Free & Single. According to AGB Nielsen Media Research, the episodes achieved a nationwide rating of 1.334%.

Episode 13 of season 3, broadcast on December 1, 2012, and hosted by Jay Park, achieved a nationwide rating of 1.54%, with a peak of 1.85%. It recorded 1.04% ratings in the 20 to 49 age group, as well as 1.96% with a peak of 2.49% for women in their 40s, making it the most-watched program in its time slot for both age groups.

== Season 8 controversies ==
Nearing the conclusion of Season 8 in 2016, an episode that featured the boy band B1A4, SNL Korea released a behind-the-scenes video on their Facebook. The video features an introduction of the band and discussion of their upcoming appearance. As soon as the members are formally introduced, a group of female staff members grope the band members' genitals and run off. The video was taken off of the show's Facebook shortly after along with an apology to the members of B1A4. However, shortly after the incident, boy bands INFINITE and Block B released videos on their twitters under the hashtag "SNL_성추행" ('SNL sexual harassment') stating that this behavior was common on the show. A sexual assault case was filed by petition agency, E-People, against comedian Lee Se-young but the charges were eventually dropped.

SNL Korea was met with heavy criticism after airing a sketch that featured a joke about actress Um Aing-ran's chest. Um had been diagnosed with breast cancer earlier in the year and underwent surgery. Jung Yi-rang, the actress who portrayed Um in the sketch, was unaware of the severity of the condition and issued an apology to Um. Season 8 of the SNL Korea ended on December 24, 2016, with singer Hwang Chi-yeul as the last host. tvN issued a statement saying that the show will return for another season but "with a new image".

== Awards and nominations ==
Year	Award	Category	Recipient	Result	Ref.
2018	54th Baeksang Arts Awards	Best Variety Performer – Male	Kwon Hyuk-soo	Nominated	
2022	1st Blue Dragon Series Awards	Best Entertainment Program	SNL Korea	Nominated	
2022	1st Blue Dragon Series Awards	Best Male Entertainer	Shin Dong-yup	Nominated	
2022	1st Blue Dragon Series Awards	Best New Male Entertainer	Jeong Hyuk	Nominated	
2022	1st Blue Dragon Series Awards	Best New Female Entertainer	Joo Hyun-young	Won	
2023	2023 Asia Contents Awards & Global OTT Awards	Best Reality & Variety	SNL Korea	Nominated	
2023	2nd Blue Dragon Series Awards	Best Entertainment Program	SNL Korea	Nominated	
2023	2nd Blue Dragon Series Awards	Best Male Entertainer	Shin Dong-yup	Nominated	
2023	2nd Blue Dragon Series Awards	Best Female Entertainer	Joo Hyun-young	Won	
2023	2nd Blue Dragon Series Awards	Best New Male Entertainer	Nam Hyun-woo	Nominated	
2023	2nd Blue Dragon Series Awards	Best New Female Entertainer	Kim Ah-young	Won	
2024	3rd Blue Dragon Series Awards	Best Entertainment Program	SNL Korea	Nominated	
2024	3rd Blue Dragon Series Awards	Best Male Entertainer	Shin Dong-yup	Won	
2024	3rd Blue Dragon Series Awards	Best Female Entertainer	Lee Soo-ji	Nominated	
2024	3rd Blue Dragon Series Awards	Best New Male Entertainer	Ahn Do-gyu	Nominated	
2024	3rd Blue Dragon Series Awards	Best New Female Entertainer	Ji Ye-eun	Nominated	

== See also ==
- Gag Concert
- Infinite Challenge
- Korea's Got Talent
