= Ji Woo =

South Korean actress (born 1997)

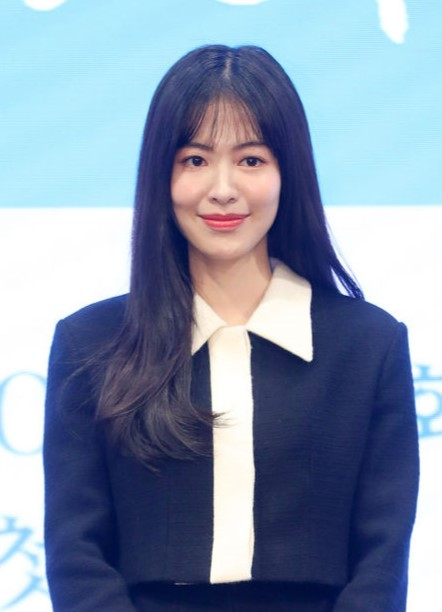
- Ji Woo in December 2023
- Born: Choi Ji-woo; November 25, 1997 (age 28); Jeonju, South Korea
- Education: Konkuk University (Film and Animation Department)
- Occupation: Actress
- Years active: 2010–present
- Agent: Hicon Entertainment

Korean name
- Hangul: 최지우
- Hanja: 崔至祐
- RR: Choe Jiu
- MR: Ch'oe Chiu

Choi Ji-woo (Korean: 최지우; born November 25, 1997), known mononymously as Ji Woo, is a South Korean actress. She started her career as a child actress with her debut movie Villain and Widow in 2010.

== Life and career ==
She attended Morak Middle School.

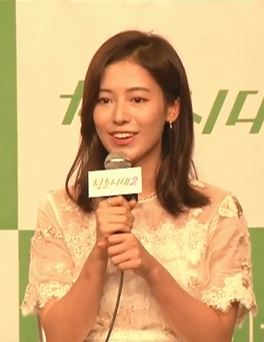
Ji Woo in August 2017

In 2017, she was an honorary ambassador of the 9th DMZ International Documentary Film Festival alongside Cho Jin-woong.

In June 2019, Ji Woo signed with new agency King Kong by Starship.

In November 2022, Ji Woo signed with Hicon Entertainment.

== Filmography ==
=== Film ===
Year	Title	Role	Notes	Ref.
2010	Villain and Widow	Ham Sung-ah	Debut film	
2012	Modern Family	Jung So-min	Segment "E.D. 571"	
2013	Fists of Legend	Im Soo-bin		
2013	When Winter Screams	Anna		
2014	Cart	Soo-kyung		
2016	Knocking on the Door of Your Heart	Yeon Eun-hee		
2016	Chae's Movie Theater	Myung-ah	Channel CGV Social Movie	
2017	A Stray Goat	Yang Ye-joo		
2018	Intimate Strangers	So-young		

=== Television series ===
Year	Title	Role	Notes	Ref.
2010	Pure Pumpkin Flower	—N/a	Bit part	
2011	War of the Roses	Park Joon-hee		
2013	Pure Love	Jung Soon-jung		
2014	Inspiring Generation	Kim Ok-ryun (young)		
2014	You're All Surrounded	Eo Soo-sun (young)		
2017	Three Color Fantasy: "The Universe's Star"	Kim Hanna / Byul		
2017	Hello, My Twenties!	Yoo Eun-jae		
2021	Sell Your Haunted House	Bae Soo-jung	Cameo appearance	
2022–2023	The First Responders	Bong An-na	Season 1–2	
2024	Love Song for Illusion	Crown Princess Geum-hwa / Jin Chae-ryun		

=== Web series ===
Year	Title	Role	Ref.
2023–2024	Gyeongseong Creature	Myeong-ja	

=== Music video appearances ===
Year	Song title	Artist	Ref.
2019	"I'm Always You"	Lee Seung-hwan	

== Stage ==
Year	Title	Role	Venue	Ref.
2021	Dressing Room	D	Daehakro Arts Theater	

== Awards and nominations ==
Name of the award ceremony, year presented, category, nominee of the award, and the result of the nomination
Award ceremony	Year	Category	Nominee / Work	Result	Ref.
SBS Drama Awards	2022	Best Supporting Actress in a Miniseries Genre/Fantasy Drama	The First Responders	Nominated	
