= Park Ji-soo (actress) =

South Korean actress (born 1988)

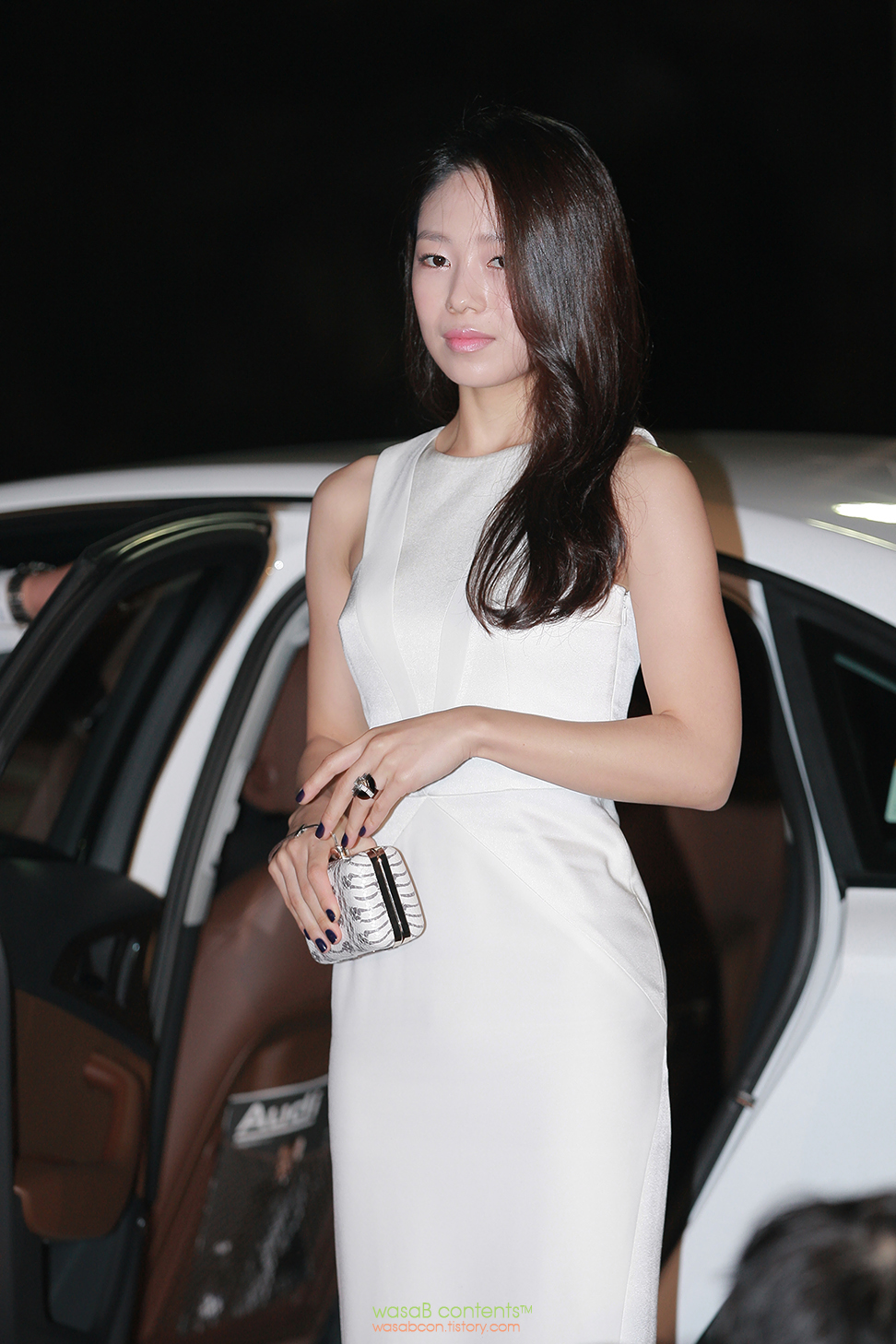
- Park in 2013
- Born: July 22, 1988 (age 38); Seoul, South Korea
- Other name: Joyce Park
- Education: Korea National University of Arts - Theater
- Occupation: Actress
- Years active: 2012–present
- Agent(s): C&CO ENS (2018-present)

Korean name
- Hangul: 박지수
- Hanja: 朴芝秀
- RR: Bak Jisu
- MR: Pak Chisu

Park Ji-soo (Korean: 박지수; born July 22, 1988) is a South Korean actress. Park made her official acting debut as the title character in Mai Ratima, the feature directorial debut of actor-director Yoo Ji-tae.

== Filmography ==
=== Film ===
Year	Title	Role	Notes
2010	Metaphor		Short film
2012	A Company Man	Dispensary employee	
2013	Dirty Harry		Short film
2013	Mai Ratima	Mai Ratima	
2013	Neverdie Butterfly	Choi Se-jin's friend	
2015	Sometimes I Want To Be A Porn Star	Hye-ri	
2017	The End of April	Hyeon-jin	
2017	Glass Garden	Soo-hee	

=== Television series ===
Year	Title	Role	Network
2014	The Idle Mermaid	Yoon Jin-ah	tvN
2020	Mom Has an Affair	Park Hye-jin	SBS

== Awards and nominations ==
Year	Award	Category	Nominated work	Result
2013	34th Blue Dragon Film Awards	Best New Actress	Mai Ratima	Won
2014	1st Wildflower Film Awards	Best Actress	Mai Ratima	Nominated
2014	1st Wildflower Film Awards	Best New Actor/Actress	Mai Ratima	Nominated
2014	50th Baeksang Arts Awards	Best New Actress (Film)	Mai Ratima	Nominated
2017	21st Bucheon International Fantastic Film Festival	Korean Fantastic: Best Actress	The End of April	Won
