= A Stray Goat =

- Theatrical poster
- Hangul: 눈발
- Lit.: Snowflake
- RR: Nunbal
- MR: Nunpal
- Directed by: Cho Jae-min
- Written by: Cho Jae-min
- Produced by: Choi Tae-young
- Starring: Park Jin-young; Ji Woo
- Production company: Myung Films
- Distributed by: Little Big Pictures
- Release dates: April 30, 2016 (JIFF); March 1, 2017
- Running time: 91 minutes
- Country: South Korea
- Language: Korean
- Box office: US$107,567

A Stray Goat (Korean: 눈발) is a 2016 South Korean film written and directed by Cho Jae-min and starring Park Jin-young and Ji Woo. The film marks Park Jin-young's big screen debut.

The film was premiered at the 17th Jeonju International Film Festival on April 30, 2016 and was theatrically released on March 1, 2017.

== Synopsis ==
Min-sik moves to a rural village in Gyeongsang Province with his family. He meets Ye-joo, a classmate who is bullied by others due to her father being accused of murder.

== Cast ==
- Park Jin-young as Jo Min-sik
- Ji Woo as Yang Ye-joo
- Shin Ahn-jin as Hyun-oh
- Jung Na-on as Mi-hee
- Jang Myung-gab as Yang Sang-man
- Kim Ki-joo as Nam-gon
- Lee Tae-joon as Sang-deuk
- Lee Chan-hee as Jin-ho
- Jang Hee-ryung as Soo-jung
- Park Ga-young as Yoo-kyung
- Lee Hae-sung as Tae-soo
- Kim Seung-tae as Butler

== Production ==
A Stray Goat was produced by Myung Films, the production company which produced Joint Security Area, Architecture 101 and Cart. It is a production by the first term students of Myung Film Movie School which was set up by Myung Films. It is also Cho Jae-min's directorial debut.
