= The Idle Mermaid =

2014 South Korean television series

- Promotional poster for The Idle Mermaid
- Also known as: Surplus Princess; The Mermaid
- Hangul: 잉여공주
- RR: Ingyeo gongju
- MR: Ingyŏ kongju
- Genre: Romance; Comedy; Fantasy
- Based on: "The Little Mermaid" by Hans Christian Andersen
- Written by: Park Ran; Kim Ji-soo
- Directed by: Baek Seung-ryong
- Starring: Jo Bo-ah; On Joo-wan; Song Jae-rim; Park Ji-soo
- Country of origin: South Korea
- Original language: Korean
- No. of episodes: 10

Production
- Running time: 45-50 minutes on Thursdays at 23:00 (KST)

Original release
- Network: tvN
- Release: August 7 – October 9, 2014

The Idle Mermaid (Korean: 잉여공주; lit. 'Surplus Princess') is a 2014 South Korean romantic comedy television series starring Jo Bo-ah, On Joo-wan, Song Jae-rim, and Park Ji-soo. A modern retelling of the 1837 fairy tale "The Little Mermaid" by Hans Christian Andersen, it aired on tvN from August 7 to October 9, 2014 on Thursdays at 23:00. Originally slated to run for 14 episodes, the total number of episodes was reduced to 10. The series inspired an unofficial Indonesian adaptation called Mermaid in Love.

== Series overview ==
Aileen is a mermaid princess who is in love with Kwon Shi-kyung, a human celebrity chef. While recording a TV show next to the Han River, Shi-kyung hits his head and falls into the river, and Aileen stops him from drowning by kissing him underwater. Shi-kyung is pulled out from the water by Yoon Jin-ah, an intern who works for and is also in love with Shi-kyung. In order to meet Shi-kyung again, Aileen steals a magic potion from the male witch Ahn Ma-nyeo, and is transformed into a human girl. It's only after her transformation that Aileen learns that she has 100 days to find true love, or else she will die and turn into bubbles. Ahn Ma-nyeo helps Aileen by setting her up with the fake identity of "Kim Ha-ni," and sends her to live in a house in Seoul with other young people, most of whom are unemployed and searching for jobs. Among Aileen's new housemates is Lee Hyun-myung, Yoon Jin-ah's ex-boyfriend who is trying to win her back. With her new friends to help her, Aileen vows to find a way to win Shi-kyung's love, but in the end she falls in love with Hyun-myung. Although she initially disappears once her 100 days are up, she returns to life a year later to see her friends again.

== Cast ==
=== Principal ===
- Jo Bo-ah as Kim Ha-ni/Aileen

The eighteenth mermaid princess of a mermaid kingdom in the sea. She finds a smartphone that fell into the sea and uses it to surf the internet and learn about the human world. She becomes infatuated with chef Kwon Shi-kyung; after saving him from the Han River, Aileen decides to become human so that she can be with him.

- On Joo-wan as Lee Hyun-myung

A human and resident of surplus house, he is unable to find a job with his art degree. At the request of his girlfriend Jin-ah, he gives up his pursuit of art and tries to find a desk job.

- Song Jae-rim as Kwon Shi-kyung

A famous chef in the human world. Believed to be cold and arrogant, he suffers from prosopagnosia by a hit of head. His father is a diplomat.

- Park Ji-soo as Yoon Jin-ah

Hyun-myung's ex-girlfriend. A former resident of surplus house, she leaves when she obtains a job at JH Food corporation.

=== Supporting ===
- Kim Seul-gi as Ahn Hye-young

A resident of surplus house. She has a live webcast wherein she eats massive amounts of food for her viewers' pleasure. Hye-young becomes Aileen's friend and confidant when she discovers her true identity.

- Kim Min-kyo as Do Ji-yong

A resident of surplus house. He graduated from the law school of an elite university, then spent the next ten years failing the bar exams. He is addicted to video games, and quickly develops a crush on Ha-ni.

- Nam Joo-hyuk as Park Dae-bak, aka "Big"

A resident of surplus house. He grew up comfortably but has now been cut off by his parents. He is a computer genius.

- Lee Sun-kyu as Lee Sun-kyu

The owner of surplus house. Seemingly an aging slacker, there is more to him than meets the eye. He once was Ma-nyeo's roommate.

- Jin Hee-kyung as Hong Myung-hee

The chairwoman of JH Food corporation, she falls in love with Ma-nyeo.

- Kim Jae-hwa as Kim Woo-sun

A manager of JH Food corporation, she is Jin-ah and Dae-ri's supervisor, and often speaks in French.

- Han So-young as So Dae-ri

An employee of JH Food corporation and deputy section chief under Kim Jae-hwa.

- Ahn Gil-kang as Ahn Ma-nyeo

A witch and former merman, he has become human. After the death of his wife, he runs a takoyaki stall to finance his daughter's studies abroad.

- Kim Jin-hee as Han Gook-ja

Shi-kyung's sous-chef at JH Food.

== Soundtrack ==
The Idle Mermaid: Original Sound Track

Soundtrack album by Ever-New
- Released: October 8, 2014
- Genre: Soundtrack
- Label: Danal Entertainment, J Music

No.	Title	Artist	Length
1.	"그 사람과의 마지막 대화" (The Last Conversation)	Ever-New	4:18
Total length:			4:18

== Ratings ==
- In this table, the blue numbers represent the lowest ratings and the red numbers represent the highest ratings.
- N/A denotes that the rating is not known.

Ep.	Original broadcast date	Title	Average audience share (AGB Nielsen)
Ep.	Original broadcast date	Title	Nationwide
1	August 7, 2014	개천에서 인어난다 (Mermaid from the Stream)	0.839%
2	August 14, 2014	원수는 한강다리 밑에서 만난다 (Meet Your Enemy Under the Han River Bridge)	0.966%
3	August 21, 2014	아닌 밤중에 진정한 사랑 (True Love During a Random Night)	0.599%
4	August 28, 2014	잉여도 밟으면 꿈틀한다 (Don't Step on a Mermaid's Dreams)	0.975%
5	September 4, 2014	공든 자소설 무너지랴 (Hard Work Is Never Wasted)	0.743%
6	September 11, 2014	하늘이 무너져도 솟아날 구멍은 없다 (It's the End of the World)	0.602%
7	September 18, 2014	아니 땐 심장이 두근대랴 (The Heart Pounds for a Reason)	0.537%
8	September 25, 2014	실패는 잉여의 어머니 (Failure Breeds Surplus)	—N/a
9	October 2, 2014	오르지 못할 나무 쳐다볼 순 있다 (You Can at Least Shoot for the Stars)	—N/a
10	October 9, 2014	물거품 무서워 사랑 못하랴! (Think I Can't Love Because I'm Afraid of Bubbles?)	0.590%
Average			— (Note: Due to some ratings not recorded, the exact average rating is unknown.)

- This drama airs on a cable channel/pay TV which normally has a relatively smaller audience compared to free-to-air TV/public broadcasters (KBS, SBS, MBC and EBS).

== International broadcast ==
- Malaysia - Under the title Idle Mermaid, it was aired in the Malaysia on TV9 from February 6, 2018 to February 21 on Monday to Thursday at 6:00pm Malaysia Time
- Philippines - Under the title The Mermaid, it was aired in the Philippines on GMA Network from May 4, 2015 to June 12, 2015 at 5:05pm (PST) replacing Fall in Love with Me.
- Thailand - It was aired in Thailand on PPTV beginning November 1, 2015.
