= Kim Min-kyo =

South Korean actor and director

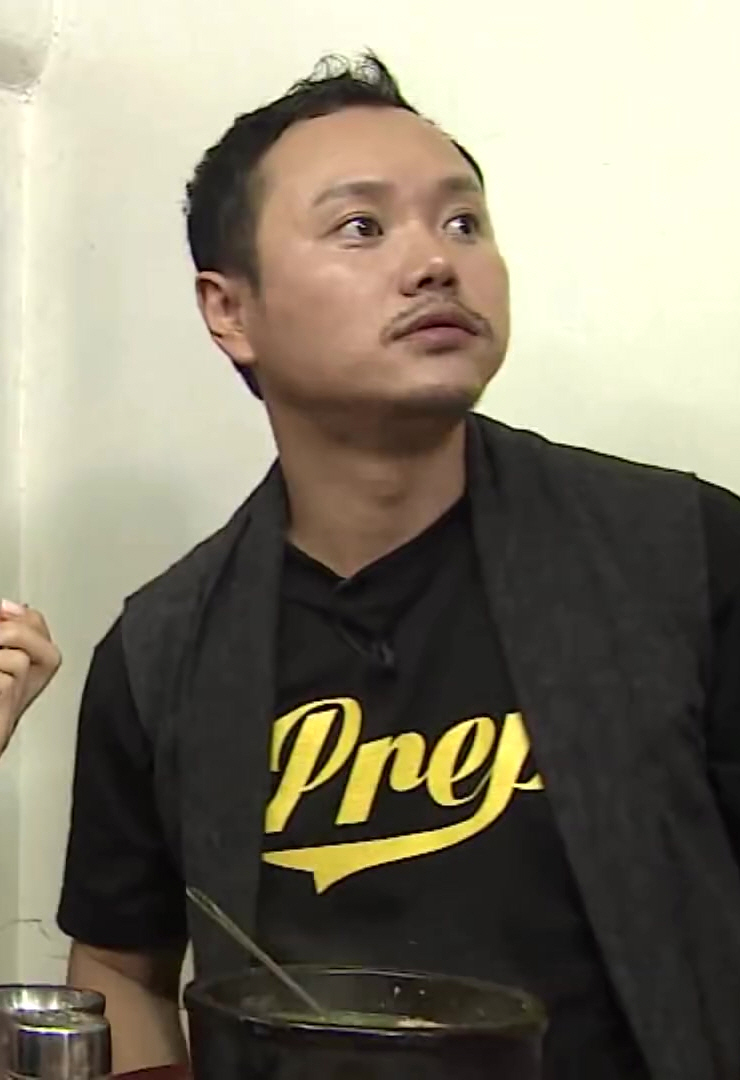
- Kim in September 2015
- Born: April 15, 1974 (age 52); Seoul, South Korea
- Notable work: Crew of Saturday Night Live Korea; Insolent Romance as Goo Bong-phil
- Spouse: Lee So-young (m. 2010)

Comedy career
- Years active: 1998–present
- Medium: Theatre, stand-up, television
- Genres: Character, Sketch, Blue, Observational, Dramatic

- Kim Min-kyo
- Hangul: 김민교
- Hanja: 金民敎
- RR: Gim Mingyo
- MR: Kim Min'gyo

Kim Min-kyo (Korean: 김민교, born April 15, 1974) is a South Korean actor and director. He is well known as a cast member of the tvN entertainment show Saturday Night Live Korea.

== Career ==
He has been performing as a stage actor on several Korean theatre plays, mainly in Daehangno for 20 years, and also working as a movie actor since 1998. On early 2012, after hard years as a relatively unknown actor, he was strongly requested by his Seoul Institute of the Arts superior Jang Jin, who served as the creative director of a brand-new live comic variety TV programme Saturday Night Live Korea. He eventually joined this programme and has been performing since May 2012. Furthermore, from the beginning of SNL Korea's 3rd season in latter of 2012, with mentorship by high-profile comedian Shin Dong-yup, his popularity has skyrocketed. During the show, he played a series of unexpected sexual characters, which led its viewers to misapprehend him as an LGBT member.

Currently, he serves both as a recurring stage director and actor of his works in South Korean arts circle, and considered as a de facto member of Jang Jin's Division (장진사단), alongside Kim Seul-gi, Go Kyung-pyo, Kwon Hyeok-su, and others. He admires Steven Chow as his role model, who numerously covers both comic and tragic acts.

=== Insolent Romance ===
Prior to joining SNL Korea, he wrote and directed a Korean play called Want Night (달콤한 원나잇), which was later re-branded as Insolent Romance (발칙한 로맨스), a globally-successful Korean movie director Daniel Bong-phil Goo, who meets his first-ever loved female friend called Ma Soo-ji, who had married after he left to Hollywood of Los Angeles over a decade ago, which is not usually happened in Korean society but included Kim Min-kyo's own possible and imaginary situations. During a winter season of 2012–2013, he acted a main character of this play, Goo Bong-phil (구봉필). This play has been co-worked with his Seoul Institute of the Arts colleague Kim Soo-ro as his producer. Its commercial success in Daehangno led Kim Su-ro to make a series of launching authentic stage plays called Kim Su-ro Project (김수로 프로젝트), and this play marks the 1st product of the project.

== Filmography ==
=== Variety show ===
- 2012–present: tvN Saturday Night Live Korea (Season 2, 3, 4)
- 2013: MBC Infinite Challenge – Summer Variety Camp, as camp-trainee Kim Min-kyo (August 3–10, 2013, 341st and 342nd episode of Season 4)
- 2013: MBC Story-show Hwasubun (이야기쇼 화수분), as guest-anchor Kim Min-kyo (September 5, 2013, 2nd episode)
- 2013: Y-Star Gourmet Road (식신로드), as guest of Jun-ha's acquaintance Kim Min-kyo (October 6, 2013, 150th episode)
- 2016 : Hello Counselor KBS2 as Guest on Episode 298
- 2016 : Battle Trip KBS2 as Guest with Im Hyung-joon & Lee Jong-hyuk on (June 11 – 18, 2016, Episode 9–10)
- 2017 : Battle Trip KBS2 as Guest with Han Jung-soo & Im Hyung-joon on (January 7 – 14, 2017, Episode 33–34)
- A Man Who Feeds The Dog - Cast member

==== Notable characters on SNL Korea ====
- Kim Min-kyo (himself), main player of the "SNL Games" (SNL 게임즈) segments, and also as an apprentice of famed fake writer Shin Dong-yup, on Eung-kyo (응교), a parody of Eun-gyo, alongside Hyuna as Eung-kyo
- An impersonated lover of Gwanghae on Gwang-ae (광애; means 'mad love'), a parody of CJ E&M's movie, Masquerade, as an 'SNL Digital Short' (Korean edition)
- Moon Je-ni (문제니), a parody of Laa-laa on the BBC's programme Teletubbies; also one of a character on Yeouido Teletubbies, weekly summaries of the 2012 presidential election campaign
- Candidate Mr.Moon (문후보), on Babysitter interview (베이비시터 면접), a parody of 2012 presidential election TV-debates
- Moon Hee-joon (문희준), singer and songwriter, famed as former H.O.T. (boyband) member, on Real Ton Hyuk, as an SNL Digital Short (in Korean), and additional skits especially on Season 4.
- Wayne Rooney, on Shut up coarse netizen (악플러 입닥치자), alongside 4Minute as an SNL Digital Short (in Korean)
- Ryu Hyun-jin (류현진), on Jumping 2 O'clock – Cultwo Show (두시탈주 컬투쇼), a parody of Escape 2 O'clock – Cultwo Show (두시탈출 컬투쇼) on SBS Power FM
- Ga-ri-ong (가리옹), a parody of South Korean Hip-hop artist Garion (가리온), on Mnet's casting-show Show Me the Money (쇼미더머니2)
- Yoon Mi-rae (윤미래), singer, and also a judge of the 4th season of Mnet's Superstar K
- a pristine gay-role (청순게이) who kissed Do Hak-chan, on Reply Room No.1997 (응답하라 1997호), a parody of tvN's drama Reply 1997 (응답하라 1997)
- Psy (싸이), on a SNLK live skit, for the preparation of 18th Presidential Inauguration ceremony (제18대 대통령 취임식)
- Nutria the animal, on SNL Weekend Update (in Korean), alongside its correspondent Kwon Hyeok-su (권혁수 기자) and crew Lee Sang-hoon
- a Werewolf (늑대소년), a parody of CJ E&M's movie, A Werewolf Boy, as an 'SNL Digital Short' (in Korean)
- Man No.1, a perpetrator-role (남자 1호; 추행범), on Jjaak: prisoners' edition (쨕-재소자 특집), as an 'SNL Digital Short' (in Korean), a parody of Korean matching-show Jjak on SBS
- Kim Jong Un (김정은), on a namesaked parody of Kim Jung-eun 's Chocolate (김정은의 초콜렛), late night music programme on SBS; and also on Global Teletubbies as Jong-un-ei (정은이)
- various SNL Korea's satirical advertisements for anticipated small businesses (SNL 선정 우수 중소기업)

=== Television drama ===
- 2019: Item
- 2017: SBS Temporary Idols (비정규직 아이돌), as Jung Tae-kyung
- 2017: JTBC Strong Girl Bong-soon (힘쎈여자 도봉순), as Ah Ga-ri
- 2014: KBS1 You Are The Only One (당신만이 내사랑), as Namsun Verillio Lee
- 2014: tvN The Idle Mermaid (잉여공주), as Do Ji-yong
- 2013: MBC The King's Daughter, Soo Baek-hyang (제왕의 딸 수백향), as Mang-gu
- 2013: tvN Dating Agency: Cyrano (연애조작단; 시라노), as Go Young-dal
- 2012: KBS2 KBS Drama Special: The Wedding Planner (또 한번의 웨딩), as Chae Ha-kyung's brother-in-law
- 2011: SBS Sign (싸인), as police officer (January 5, 1st episode)

=== Advertisement ===
- 2013: LG Uplus LTE commercial-series, alongside Kim Won-hae, Kim Gura, John Park, and Kim Ji-min; TicketPlanet movie-ticketing service, alongside Kim Seul-gi
- 2013: MMORPG Jin-wang Online game; alongside Seo Yu-ri
- 2013: Happy House planned apartments; alongside Ahn Young-mi
- 2013: Nikon D5200 Digital Camera; alongside Ahn Young-mi and Kwon Hyeok-su
- 2013: Hyundai Avante compact car; alongside Seo Yu-ri, Ahn Young-mi and Lee Sang-hoon
- 2013: Wemakeprice Mobile commerce service; alongside Kim Seul-gi

=== Theater ===
- 2012–2013: Clumsy People(서툰 사람들') – stage director, and acted as Jang Deok-bae: counterparted with Kim Seul-gi
- 2012–2013: Insolent Romance(발칙한 로맨스) – plot writer, stage director, and acted as Goo Bong-phil
- 2012–2013: Lee Gi-dong's Gym(이기동 체육관) – stage director: alongside its producer Kim Soo-ro
- 2009–2011: Want night(달콤한 원나잇) – stage director, plot writer
- 2006–2011: Gwang-soo's Thoughts(광수생각), – stage director, and acted as Gwang-soo
- 2021 : Limit Re-Meet (리미트 Re-Meet), – plot writer, stage director, and acted as Goo Bong-phil

=== Musicals ===
- 2007: Blue Diamonds; 3-dime opera(블루 다이아몬드; 서푼짜리 오페라), as gang 3rd
- 2006: From the Bottom(밑바닥에서), as Ssa-chin
- 2005: Kholstomer – The story of a horse(홀스토메르 – 어느 말의 이야기)

=== Film ===
- 2018: Snatch Up as Thug
- 2017: Part-Time Spy as Department Head Yang
- 2017: Fabricated City as Daoshi Yong
- 2017: Bounty Hunters
- 2015: Love Clinic as photographer
- 2014: Man on High Heels as man 1
- 2012: Ghost Sweepers as police officer in Uljin
- 2010: The Servant as eunuch
- 2009: Secret as prostitute
- 2009: Hello My Love as Park Moon-gi
- 2008: Rough Cut as threatening man 1
- 2008: Life is Cool as waiter
- 2008: Life is Beautiful as Police officer Choi
- 2007: Our Town as Detective Park
- 2004: Au Revoir, UFO as cameo
- 2003: Star as personnel 4
- 2002: A Little Monk as Jeong-sim
- 2002: Break Out as alumnus of an elementary school
- 2001: Guns & Talks as soldier 2
- 1998: Seongchul (his screen debut)

=== Music video appearances ===
- 2013: AOA Black's "MOYA" (모야), as male character Kim Min-kyo
- 2013: Heyne's "Love007", as James Bond
- 2014: G.NA's "예쁜 속옷" (G.NA's Secret), as lingerie store clerk

=== Other ===
- 2013: Mnet M! Countdown(엠카운트다운), special guest for 4Minute's performance of What's Your Name? (May 16, with a costume of Wayne Rooney which he previously wore on SNL Korea Digital Short segment)
- 2013: tvN Paik Ji-yeon's People Inside(백지연의 피플인사이드), Interview of SNL Korea's Crew, alongside Kim Seul-gi, Jeong Seong-ho, and Jeong Myeong-ok (May 1, 353th episode)
- 2013: Mnet Wide Entertainment News(와이드 연예뉴스) – Star Cam(era, of Kim Seul-gi), appeared during SNL Korea's programming preparation (April 24, 769th episode)
- 2012: EBS Mother-story(어머니 전) – Director Jang Jin and his mother, appeared during a preparation of Clumsy people with Kim Seul-gi (September 28, 30th episode)

=== Web series ===
Year	Title	Role	Ref.
2022	Returning Student: Grade A, but Love is F	Min-kyo	

== Personal life ==
In January 2010, Kim Min-kyo married his long-time fan, who had dated him since 2005. He, who holds several martial arts title including hapkido and taekwondo, is atheist, however, sometimes he jokes that his namesaked religion is "Min-Kyo", which means that he believes in himself.

On May 9, 2020, Kim Min-kyo's dog, which had a history of attacking people and was not leashed even after numerous complaints, attacked a woman in her 80s resulting in her death. In response, Kim Min-kyo posted an apology on SNS but did not apologize to the family members directly.
