= Psychopath Diary =

2019 South Korean television series

- Promotional poster
- Hangul: 싸이코패스 다이어리
- RR: Ssaikopaeseu daieori
- MR: Ssaik'op'aesŭ taiŏri
- Genre: Comedy; Thriller
- Created by: Studio Dragon
- Written by: Choe Sung-jun; Kim Hwan-chae; Ryu Yong-jae
- Directed by: Lee Jong-jae
- Starring: Yoon Shi-yoon; Jung In-sun; Park Sung-hoon
- Country of origin: South Korea
- Original language: Korean
- No. of episodes: 16

Production
- Running time: 60 minutes
- Production company: KeyEast

Original release
- Network: tvN
- Release: November 20, 2019 – January 9, 2020

Psychopath Diary (Korean: 싸이코패스 다이어리) is a 2019 South Korean television series starring Yoon Shi-yoon, Jung In-sun and Park Sung-hoon. It aired on tvN from November 20, 2019, to January 9, 2020.

== Synopsis ==
Yook Dong-sik (Yoon Shi-yoon), an analyst who works at Daehan Securities, has a timid personality. He can't even get angry at the people who look down upon him. One day, shortly after failing on his attempt of suicide, he witnesses a murder. He unintentionally picks up a diary belonging to the murderer, on which was written the log of his murders. He flees with the diary, but he is accidentally hit by Police Officer Shim Bo-kyung's (Jung In-sun) patrol car which causes him to suffer from retrograde amnesia. Due to the diary in his possession, Dong-sik mistakenly believes he is a psychopath. Since that moment, his behavior started to change. Bo-kyung, who got involved with Dong-sik, decides to catch the serial killer.

Meanwhile, Seo In-woo (Park Sung-hoon), the director and son of the chairman of Daehan Securities where Dong-sik works, turns out to be the heartless psychopath serial killer. He loses his diary when his 6th victim, a homeless old man tossed his diary away. He feels insecure ever since.

== Cast ==
=== Main ===
- Yoon Shi-yoon as Yook Dong-sik, a timid and pushover man who works as a clerk at Daehan Securities. His weak personality begins to change when he perceives himself as a killer.
- Jung In-sun as Shim Bo-kyung, an officer in a patrol station.
- Park Sung-hoon as Seo In-woo, the real psychopathic serial killer who is also the director of Daehan Securities where Dong-sik works at.

=== Supporting ===
==== People around Yook Dong-sik ====
- Lee Han-wi as Yook Jong-chul, Dong-sik's father.
- Hwang Geum-byul as Yook Ji-yeon, Dong-sik's older sister.
- Kim Gyul as Jo Yong-gu, Dong-sik's brother-in-law.
- Jung Su-bin as Yook Dong-chan, Dong-sik's younger half-brother.
- So Hee-jung as Na In-hye, Dong-sik's step-mother, Dong-chan's mother.
- Heo Sung-tae as Jang Chil-sung, a gangster who lives at Unit 708. He later addresses Dong-sik as his 'Big Boss' after mistakenly believes him to be a serial killer.

==== People around Shim Bo-kyung ====
- Choi Sung-won as Heo Taek-soo, Bo-kyung's partner.
- Kim Myung-soo as Shim Seok-gu, Bo-kyung's father who is a former investigator police.
- Lee Kan-hee as Lee Suk-yeon, Bo-kyung's mother.
- Lee Hae-young as Officer Ryu Jae-joon

==== People around Seo In-woo ====
- Park Jung-hak as Seo Chung-hyeon, In-woo's father who is the chairman of Daehan Securities.
- Yoo Bi as Seo Ji-hun, In-woo's step-brother and managing director of Daehan Securities.
- Yoon Ye-hee as Kim Eun-shil, Chung-hyeon's wife and Ji-hun's mother.
- Kim Hye-na as Seo Ji-eun, In-woo's step-sister.
- Lim Il-gyu as Kim Chan-il, In-woo's brother-in-law.
- Han Soo-hyun as Kim Mu-seok, former detective who now works for In-woo.

==== People at Daehan Securities ====
- Choi Dae-chul as Gong Chan-seok, the manager of Team 3 and Dong-sik's boss who is selfish and rude.
- Kim Ki-doo as Park Jae-ho, Dong-shik's cunning team member who claims to be his best friend.
- Jo Shi-nae as Han Jung-ah, Dong-sik's colleague.
- Lee Min-ji as Oh Min-joo
- Choi Tae-hwan as Shin Seok-hyun
- Hwang Sun-hee as Jo Yoo-jin

=== Others ===
- Gu Ja-geon as a bully

=== Special appearances ===
- Jung Hae-kyun as Kim Myung-gook, a homeless man. (Ep. 1–2)
- Yura as a girl with a dog in park (Ep. 2)
- Nam Jung-hee as murder victim (Ep. 2)
- Jo Yoon Ho as Chil-sung's junior (Ep. 2)
- Han Ji-eun as a woman with a big guy (Ep. 2)
- Yoon Ji-on as Joo Young-min (Ep. 4–5)
- Lee Hyun-woong as Oh Myung-dal (Ep. 12–13, 16)

== Production ==
The first script reading was held in August 2019 in Sangam-dong, Seoul.

== Original soundtrack ==
Psychopath Diary OST

Soundtrack album by Various Artists
- Released: 2019-20
- Genre: Soundtrack
- Languages: Korean; English
- Label: Stone Music Entertainment

=== Part 1 ===
Released on December 12, 2019
No.	Title	Artist	Length
1.	"Wanna be Bad" (슬퍼하고싶어)	Woosung (The Rose)	2:59
2.	"Wanna be Bad" (Inst.)		2:59
Total length:			5:18

=== Part 2 ===
Released on January 2, 2020
No.	Title	Artist	Length
1.	"Stay the same" (동일하게)	Cha Yeo-wool	3:26
2.	"Stay the same" (Inst.)		3:26
Total length:			6:52

Disc 2:
No.	Title	Artist	Length
1.	"Psychopath Diary" (Opening Title)	Um Ki Yup, Um Ki Hyun, Lee Sun Gyeol	2:54
2.	"Dongshik's Polka"	Um Ki Yup, Um Ki Hyun, Lee Sun Gyeol	2:35
3.	"Red Diary"	Um Ki Yup, Park Min Ji	2:40
4.	"Suspense"	Kim Hee Jin	1:40
5.	"Dongshik's related memories"	Um Ki Yup, Um Ki Hyun, Park Min Ji	3:46
6.	"Do I look like a pushover"	Um Ki Yup, Um Ki Hyun	3:10
7.	"I'm a Psycho"	FaraEffect	3:06
Total length:			24:17

== Viewership ==
Psychopath Diary : South Korea viewers per episode (thousands)

Season	Episode number																Average
Season	1	2	3	4	5	6	7	8	9	10	11	12	13	14	15	16	Average
1	440	329	451	570	563	586	613	582	507	398	426	572	502	615	719	710	536

Source: Audience measurement performed nationwide by Nielsen Korea.

Average TV viewership ratings
Ep.	Original broadcast date	Average audience share (Nielsen Korea)	
Ep.	Original broadcast date	Nationwide	Seoul
1	November 20, 2019	1.766%	1.730%
2	November 21, 2019	1.463%	1.361%
3	November 27, 2019	1.928%	2.057%
4	November 28, 2019	2.206%	2.174%
5	December 4, 2019	2.368%	2.507%
6	December 5, 2019	2.212%	2.346%
7	December 11, 2019	2.424%	2.866%
8	December 12, 2019	2.299%	2.782%
9	December 18, 2019	2.014%	2.099%
10	December 19, 2019	1.693%	1.954%
11	December 25, 2019	1.708%	2.025%
12	December 26, 2019	2.295%	2.718%
13	January 1, 2020	1.939%	2.213%
14	January 2, 2020	2.423%	2.633%
15	January 8, 2020	2.685%	2.762%
16	January 9, 2020	2.983%	3.372%
Average		2.150%	2.350%
In the table above, the blue numbers represent the lowest ratings and the red numbers represent the highest ratings.; This series aired on a cable channel/pay TV which normally has a relatively smaller audience compared to free-to-air TV/public broadcasters (KBS, SBS, MBC and EBS).
