= Kim Seul-gi =

South Korean actress (born 1991)

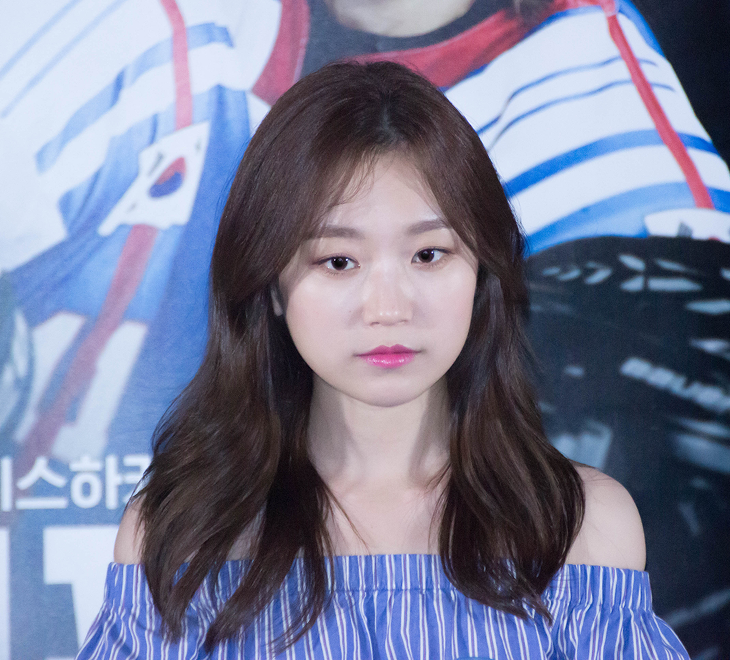
- Kim in August 2016
- Born: October 10, 1991 (age 35); Busan, South Korea
- Education: Seoul Institute of the Arts
- Occupations: Actress; comedienne
- Years active: 2011–present
- Agent: Noon Company

Korean name
- Hangul: 김슬기
- Hanja: 金瑟祺
- RR: Gim Seulgi
- MR: Kim Sŭlgi

Kim Seul-gi (Korean: 김슬기; born October 10, 1991) is a South Korean actress. She is known for starring in the television series Oh My Ghost (2015) and Splash Love (2015), as well as the film Ode to My Father (2014). She is also a former cast member of tvN's entertainment show SNL Korea.

== Early life and education ==
Kim Seul-gi was born on October 10, 1991 in Busan. Kim dreamt of becoming a musical actor while in school, and in her third year of high school she joined an acting academy. Since her family was poor, she couldn't afford to attend the school, but she took a chance and asked the academy to support her. Recognizing her passion, the academy accepted her and gave her the opportunity to study acting.

She majored in musicals at the Department of Acting of Seoul Institute of the Arts.

== Career ==
Kim completed her studies in 2010. The following year, she joined the cast of "Romeo Landing on Earth", a play written and directed by the film director Jang Jin. This play was specifically staged to commemorate the 30th anniversary of the Seoul Institute of the Arts. Kim's participation in the production was as a member of the college theater society known as "Venture to Meet" (만남의 시도). Her exceptional performance in the play impressed Jang Jin.

Months later in mid-2011, when Jang Jin was looking for cast members for the live comic variety show called SNL Korea, he recruited Kim as part of the cast. Through the programme, her popularity significantly increased, especially in the latter half of 2012. She often cursed on the programme, earning her the nickname "nation's cursing sister". Accordingly, she became a mainstream model in 2013, appearing in numerous advertisements ranging from dairy products to insurance and telecommunication companies.

She is a member of both the "Jang Jin Division" (장진사단), a group of entertainers who have been influenced by Jang Jin, and his entertainment company called Film-it-suda (필름있수다).

In 2014, Kim Seul-gi furthered her career, appearing in the movie Miss Granny and the KBS Drama Special episode "I'm Dying Soon". Her performance in the KBS2 Monday-Tuesday drama Discovery of Love, which first aired in August, also gathered her attention.

== Filmography ==
=== Film ===
Year	Title	Role	Notes	Ref.
2012	Dong-haeng	Soo-ah	Independent films	
2012	Pyung Haeng-Sun	Han Se-ah	Independent films	
2013	Horror Stories 2	Yoon Mi-ra	Segment: Accident	
2014	Miss Granny	Ban Ha-na		
2014	Ode to My Father	Yoon Kkeut-soon		
2016	Mood of the Day	Assistant Manager Hong	Cameo	
2016	Take-Off 2	Jo Mi-ran		
2016	Lost in the Moonlight	Darami	Voice only	
2017	Fabricated City	Eun-pye		
2019	Jesters: The Game Changers	Geun-deok		
2019	Present	Bo-ra	VR film	
2021	Romance Without Love	Seon-bin's friend		
2022	Stella	Yeong-mi		
2022	Highway Family	Ji-sook		

=== Television series ===
Year	Title	Role	Notes	Ref.
2011	Heartstrings	Musical member		
2012	21st Century Family	Kim Seul-gi		
2012	Drama Special: "The Whereabouts of Noh Sook-ja"	Student	One act-drama	
2012	Drama Special: "Another Wedding"	Han Ji-hye		
2013	Flower Boys Next Door	Kim Seul-gi		
2013	Bel Ami	Dokgo Ma-te's high school teacher	Cameo (Ep. 1)	
2013	Reply 1994	Sseureki's cousin	Cameo (Ep. 14–15)	
2014	Drama Special: "I'm Dying Soon"	Kim Sa-rang	One act-drama	
2014	The Idle Mermaid	Ahn Hye-young		
2014	Discovery of Love	Yoon Sol		
2014	Drama Festival: "A Resentful Woman's Diary"	Gong Jwi	One act-drama	
2015	Kill Me, Heal Me	Heo Sook-hee	Cameo (Ep. 1–4)	
2015	Oh My Ghost	Shin Soon-ae		
2015	Splash Splash Love	Jang Dan-bi		
2016	Second to Last Love	Go Mi-rye		
2016	Love in the Moonlight	Eunuch trainee	Cameo (Ep. 18)	
2017	Weightlifting Fairy Kim Bok-joo	Seul-gi	Cameo (Ep. 15)	
2017	The Legend of the Blue Sea	Mermaid	Cameo (Ep. 20)	
2017	Three Color Fantasy: "Romance Full of Life"	Fisherwoman	Cameo (Ep. 6)	
2017	Three Color Fantasy: "Queen of the Ring"	Mo Nan-hee		
2017	The Guardians	Seo Bo-mi		
2018	Drama Stage: "All About My Rival in Love"	Seon-young	One act-drama	
2019–2020	Love with Flaws	Kim Mi-kyung		
2020	Find Me in Your Memory	Yeo Ha-kyung		
2020	Hi Bye, Mama!	Shin Soon-ae	Cameo (Ep. 10)	
2021	Racket Boys	Jang PD	Cameo (Episode 16)	
2022	Shooting Stars	Happy	Cameo (Episode 2)	
2022	The Law Cafe	Han Se-yeon		

=== Web series ===
Year	Title	Role	Ref.
2013	Infinite Power	Kim Sol	
2021	Shh, Please Take Care of Him	Bok Soo-hae	
2025	Spirit Fingers	Ko Taeng-ja (Black Finger)	

=== Television shows ===
Year	Title	Role	Notes	Ref.
2012	The Taste of Saturday Night Live Korea	Commentator and crew member		
2011–2013	Saturday Night Live Korea	Cast member	Seasons 1–4	
2013	20's Choice Awards	Moderator	with Lee Min-woo and Jun Jin and acted on a music performance of Lee Hyori's Bad Girls with Ahn Young-mi during the show	
2015	King of Mask Singer	Contestant		
2019	Surfing House	Main host		

=== Web shows ===
Year	Title	Role	Notes	Ref.
2022	Saturday Night Live Korea	Host	Season 3 – Episode 7	

=== Other ===
- 2013: tvN Paik Ji-yeon's People Inside (백지연의 피플인사이드), interview of SNL Korea's crew, alongside Kim Min-kyo, Jeong Seong-ho, and Jeong Myeong-ok (Episode 353 on May 1)
- 2013: tvN Active Talk Show: Taxi (현장토크쇼 택시), alongside Park Jae-beom (April 8)
- 2013: Mnet Music Triangle (뮤직 트라이앵글), as singer and interviewee of a song "I Woke Up Because of You" (너땜에 잠이깨) (March 6)
- 2013: SBS TV Entertainment Tonight (한밤의 TV연예), as "4 New-trendsetters of 2013" (February 27)
- 2013: Mnet Wide Entertainment News (와이드 연예뉴스), as "Hidden card(highly anticipated entertainer) of the year 2013" (January 9)
- 2012: EBS Mother-story: (어머니 전) Director Jang Jin and his mother, appeared during a preparation of Clumsy people with Kim Min-kyo (Episode 30 on September 28)

== Stage ==
=== Musicals ===
Musical performances of Kim Seul-gi
Year	Title		Role	Venue	Date	Ref.
Year	English	Korean	Role	Venue	Date	Ref.
2013	Tomorrow Morning	투모로우 모닝	Kat	KT&G Sangsang Art Centre	May 20	
2013	Tomorrow Morning	투모로우 모닝	Kat	KT&G Sangsang Art Centre	June 1 to September 1	
2013	December: Unfinished Song	디셈버	Yeo-il	Sejong Centre for the Performing Arts Grand Theatre	October 31	
2013–2014	December: Unfinished Song	디셈버	Yeo-il	Sejong Centre for the Performing Arts Grand Theatre	December 16 to January 29	
2014	December: Unfinished Song	디셈버	Yeo-il	Daegu Opera House	February 21 to March 2	
2014	December: Unfinished Song	디셈버	Yeo-il	Centum City Sohyang Theatre Lotte Card Hall, Busan	February 7 to 26	
2014	Goong: The Musical	궁	Shin Chae-kyung		May 2014	

=== Theater ===
Theater play performances of Kim Seul-gi
Year	Title		Role	Venue	Date	Ref.
Year	English	Korean	Role	Venue	Date	Ref.
2011	Romeo Landing On Earth	로미오 지구 착륙기	Mimi	Dongrang Center Drama Center (currently Namsan Arts Center)	February 16 to 20	
2011–2012	Returned to Hamlet	리턴 투 햄릿	Yi-yeon	Dongsung Art Centre Dongsung Hall	December 9 to April 8	
2012	Returned to Hamlet	리턴 투 햄릿	Yi-yeon	Small theatre of Uijeongbu Arts Centre	April 13 to 14	
2012	Returned to Hamlet	리턴 투 햄릿	Yi-yeon	Seongnam Art Centre Ensemble Theatre	June 8 to 10	
2012–2013	Clumsy People	서툰 사람들	Yoo Hwa-yi	Art One Theatre 2	June 5 to December 31	
2013	Clumsy People	서툰 사람들	Yoo Hwa-yi	COEX Art Hall	February 7 to September 1	
2017–2018	The Student and Monsieur Henri	앙리할아버지와 나	Constance	Yes 24 Stage 1	Dec 15 to Feb 18	
2018	The Student and Monsieur Henri	앙리할아버지와 나	Constance	Iksan Arts Centre	March 10	
2018	The Student and Monsieur Henri	앙리할아버지와 나	Constance	Seongnam Arts Centre Ensemble Theatre	March 16 to 17	
2018	The Student and Monsieur Henri	앙리할아버지와 나	Constance	Gyeongju Arts Centre	March 30 to 31	
2018	The Student and Monsieur Henri	앙리할아버지와 나	Constance	Ulsan Culture and Arts Centre Small Performance Hall	April 20 to 21	
2018	The Student and Monsieur Henri	앙리할아버지와 나	Constance	Daejeon Arts Centre Ensemble Hall	May 4 to 5	
2018	The Student and Monsieur Henri	앙리할아버지와 나	Constance	Gwacheon Civic Center Small Theater	May 19	
2018	The Student and Monsieur Henri	앙리할아버지와 나	Constance	Sohyang Theater Shinhan Card Hall	May 26 to 27	
2018	The Student and Monsieur Henri	앙리할아버지와 나	Constance	Suwon SK Atrium Grand Performance Hall	June 1 to 2	
2023–2024	Realise Happiness	행복을 찾아서	Lee Eun-soo	Daehak-ro TOM 2	December 5 to February 18	
2024	2024 Theatre 10,000 won 1 〈Realise Happiness〉	2024 연극만원1 〈행복을 찾아서〉	Lee Eun-soo	Seongnam Art Centre Ensemble Theatre	March 8 to 10	

== Discography ==
=== Soundtrack appearances ===
Year	Title	Album	Notes
2013	"Rude Girl" (발칙한 녀)	She is Wow! OST	Featured with Jay Park
2013	"I Woke Up Because of You" (너 땜에 잠이 깨)	My Cute Guys OST	Featured with Go Kyung-pyo

=== Music video appearances ===
Year	Song title	Artist
2013	"Bad Girls"	Lee Hyori
2013	"Thank You, Thank You"	Ra.D

== Awards and nominations ==
Year	Award	Category	Nominated work	Result	Ref.
2013	7th Mnet 20's Choice Awards	20's Booming Star – Female	SNL Korea and My Cute Guys	Nominated	
2014	3rd APAN Star Awards	Best New Actress	Discovery of Love	Won	
2014	MBC Drama Awards	Best Actress in a Drama Short	A Resentful Woman's Diary	Nominated	
2014	KBS Drama Awards	Best New Actress	Discovery of Love and I'm Dying Soon	Won	
2015	10th Max Movie Awards	Best Supporting Actress	Miss Granny	Nominated	
2015	10th Max Movie Awards	Best New Actress	Ode to My Father	Won	
2015	51st Baeksang Arts Awards	Best New Actress (TV)	Discovery of Love	Nominated	
2016	11th Seoul International Drama Awards	Best Actress	Splash Splash Love	Nominated	
2016	4th Annual DramaFever Awards	Best Supporting Actress	Oh My Ghost	Won	
2016	4th Annual DramaFever Awards	Best Womance with Park Bo-young	Oh My Ghost	Nominated	
2016	tvN10 Awards	Best Chemistry with Park Bo-young	Oh My Ghost	Won	
2016	tvN10 Awards	Made in tvN, Actress in Variety	Saturday Night Live Korea	Won	
2016	SBS Drama Awards	Excellence Award, Actress in a Romantic Comedy Drama	Second to Last Love	Nominated	
2017	13th Interpark Golden Ticket Awards	Best Actress in Theater	The Student and Monsieur Henri	Won	
2017	22nd Chunsa Film Art Awards	Special Popularity Award	—N/a	Won	
2017	MBC Drama Awards	Excellence Award, Actress in a Monday-Tuesday Drama	The Guardians	Nominated	
2019	MBC Drama Awards	Excellence Award, Actress in a Wednesday-Thursday Miniseries	Love with Flaws	Nominated	
2020	MBC Drama Awards	Excellence Award, Actress in a Wednesday-Thursday Miniseries	Find Me in Your Memory	Won	
2022	KBS Drama Awards	Best Supporting Actress	The Law Cafe	Nominated	
