= The Universe's Star =

2017 South Korean television series

- Official Poster
- Also known as: Star of the Universe; Three Color fantasy – The Universe's Star (White)
- Genre: Romance; Fantasy; Comedy
- Written by: Kim Ji-hyun
- Directed by: Kim Ji-hyun
- Starring: Kim Jun-myeon; Ji Woo
- Theme music composer: Jung Ji-chan
- Country of origin: South Korea
- Original language: Korean
- No. of episodes: 6 (MBC); 21 (Naver TV Cast)

Production
- Executive producer: Kim Tae-wook
- Producer: Kim Ho-joon
- Cinematography: Kim Sun-chul
- Editor: Baek Kyung-hwa
- Running time: 30 minutes (MBC); 10 minutes (Naver TV Cast)

Original release
- Network: MBC; Naver TV Cast
- Release: January 23 – February 10, 2017

Related
- Three Color Fantasy

The Universe's Star (Korean: 우주의 별이; Hanja: 宇宙의 별이; RR: Ujuui byeori) is a South Korean television drama starring Suho (EXO) and Ji Woo. The drama is one of the "Three Color Fantasy" drama trilogy by MBC and Naver. The drama's color is White and it will be followed by Romance Full of Life (Green). It is airing on Naver TV Cast every weekday at 23:59 (KST) starting from January 23 and on MBC every Thursday at 23:10 (KST) starting from January 26, 2017.

== Plot ==
The Universe's Star is a love story between a gifted singer-songwriter Woo-joo (Suho) and Byul (Ji Woo), a 19-year-old student who becomes the Grim Reaper after dying in an accident.

== Cast ==
=== Main ===
- Suho as Han Woo-joo
- Ji Woo as Lee Byul-ee

=== Supporting ===
- Shin Hyun-soo as Koo Se-joo
- Na Hae-ryung as Dr. Yoon So-ri
- Yoon Jin-sol as Gak-shi
- Go Gyu-pil as Manager Ko, Woo-joo's manager
- Lee Si-eon as grim reaper
- Lee Ji-hoon as Uhm Dae-pyong

=== Special appearance ===
- Joo Jin-mo as Manager Ko
- Lee Dae-yeon as Woo-joo's father
- Lady Jane as Jo Yi-na

== Production ==
The drama is pre-produced as a co-production between Naver and iMBC.

The drama is written and directed by Kim Ji-hyun who's known for Splash Splash Love which won an award at the 20th AsiaTV Awards as the best short drama.

First script reading took place in September, 2016 at MBC Broadcasting Station in Sangam, South Korea.

== Original soundtrack ==
The Universe's Star OST Album

Soundtrack album by Suho, Remi
- Released: February 10, 2017
- Genre: Soundtrack
- Length: 12:54
- Language: Korean, English
- Label: S.M. Entertainment, Snow Music, KT Music

No.	Title	Artists	Length
1.	"Starlight" (낮에 뜨는 별)	Suho (EXO) feat. Remi	03:08
2.	"The Moment I First Saw" (처음 본 순간)	Remi	03:19
3.	"Starlight" (Inst.)		03:08
4.	"The Moment I First Saw" (Inst.)		03:19
Total length:			12:54

== Ratings ==
- In the table below, the blue numbers represent the lowest ratings and the red numbers represent the highest ratings.
- NR denotes that the drama did not rank in the top 20 daily programs on that date.

Ep.	Date	Average audience share (Nationwide)	
Ep.	Date	TNmS	AGB Nielsen
1	January 26, 2017	2.1% (NR)	1.4% (NR)
2	January 26, 2017	2.1% (NR)	1.0% (NR)
3	February 2, 2017	1.7% (NR)	2.4% (NR)
4	February 2, 2017	1.1% (NR)	1.5% (NR)
5	February 9, 2017	1.3% (NR)	1.2% (NR)
6	February 9, 2017	0.8% (NR)	1.0% (NR)
Average		1.5%	1.4%
