= Romance Full of Life =

2017 South Korean television series

- Promotional Poster
- Also known as: Three Color fantasy – Romance Full of Life; Vivid Love; Vivid Romance
- Genre: Romance; Fantasy
- Written by: Park Eun-young; Park Hee-kwon
- Directed by: Park Sang-hoon
- Starring: Yoon Shi-yoon; Cho Soo-hyang
- Country of origin: South Korea
- Original language: Korean
- No. of episodes: 6 (MBC)

Production
- Running time: 30 minutes (MBC)

Original release
- Network: MBC; Naver TV Cast
- Release: February 16 – March 2, 2017 (MBC)

Related
- Three Color Fantasy

Romance Full of Life (Korean: 생동성 연애; Hanja: 生動性戀愛; RR: Saengdongseong yeonae; lit. 'Vivid Love') is a 6-episode South Korean television drama starring Yoon Shi-yoon and Cho Soo-hyang. The drama is one of the "Three Color Fantasy" drama trilogy by MBC. The drama's color is Green. It was preceded by The Universe's Star (White) and it will be followed by Queen of the Ring (Gold). It aired on Naver TV Cast every Tuesday at 0:00 (KST) starting from February 14, and on MBC every Thursday at 23:10 (KST) starting from February 16, 2017.

== Plot ==
Story about So In-sung (Yoon Shi-yoon) a dork looking guy, who has been preparing for the examination to become a police officer for 4 years. Despite failing the exam 8 times, In-sung has a positive personality. He then applies for a high paying part-time job called "Experiment Full of Life" and becomes a super-hero and all the ladies fall for him .

== Cast ==
=== Main ===
- Yoon Shi-yoon as So In-sung
- Cho Soo-hyang as Wang So-ra

=== Supporting ===
- Kang Ki-young as Jo Ji-sub
- Kim Min-soo as Gong Moo
- Jang Hee-ryung as Kim Tae-yi
- Hwang Young-hee as In-sung's mother
- Ji Dae-han as Convenience store manager
- Kim Ji-eun as Student
- Woo Do-im as Song Ae-kyo
- Lee Jin-kwon as Supporting

=== Others ===
- Kim Ji-eun as Nurse (ep. #1-2)

=== Special appearance ===
- Woo Hyun as In-sung's father
- Kim Seul-gi as Fisherwoman (ep.6)

== Production ==
The drama is pre-produced and a co-production between Naver and iMBC.

This drama marks the directing debut of the director Park Sang-hoon and his second work after directing the movie A Mere Life. The screenwriter Park Eun-young is known for his drama Hwarang: The Poet Warrior Youth.

First script reading took place in September, 2016 at MBC Broadcasting Station in Sangam, South Korea.

== Ratings ==
- In the table below, the blue numbers represent the lowest ratings and the red numbers represent the highest ratings.
- NR denotes that the drama did not rank in the top 20 daily programs on that date.

| Ep. | Date | Average audience share (Nationwide) | |
| Ep. | Date | TNmS | AGB Nielsen |
|---|---|---|---|
| 1 | February 16, 2017 | 1.8% (NR) | 2.1% (NR) |
| 2 | February 16, 2017 | 1.9% (NR) | 2.9% (NR) |
| 3 | February 23, 2017 | 1.7% (NR) | 1.8% (NR) |
| 4 | February 23, 2017 | 2.0% (NR) | 1.7% (NR) |
| 5 | March 2, 2017 | 1.6% (NR) | 1.4% (NR) |
| 6 | March 2, 2017 | 1.2% (NR) | 1.2% (NR) |
| Average | | 1,7% | 1.9% |
