= Queen of the Ring (TV series) =

2017 South Korean television series

- Promotional Poster
- Also known as: Three Color fantasy – Queen of the Ring
- Hangul: 반지의 여왕
- Hanja: 斑指의女王
- RR: Banjiui yeowang
- MR: Panjiŭi yŏwang
- Genre: Romance; Fantasy
- Written by: Kim Ah-jung
- Directed by: Kwon Sung-chan
- Starring: Kim Seul-gi; Ahn Hyo-seop
- Country of origin: South Korea
- Original language: Korean
- No. of episodes: 6 (MBC)

Production
- Executive producers: Park Sung-eun; Kang Tae-wook
- Producer: Yoo Hyun-joong
- Running time: 30 minutes (MBC)
- Production companies: MBC; Naver

Original release
- Network: MBC; Naver TV Cast
- Release: March 9 – March 23, 2017 (MBC)

Related
- Three Color Fantasy

Queen of the Ring (Korean: 반지의 여왕; RR: Banjiui yeowang) is a 6-episode South Korean television drama starring Kim Seul-gi and Ahn Hyo-seop. The drama is one of the "Three Color Fantasy" drama trilogy by MBC and Naver. The drama's color is Gold, It's previously occupied by Romance Full of Life (Green). It aired on Naver TV Cast every Tuesday at 0:00 (KST) from March 7, 2017 and on MBC every Thursday at 23:10 (KST) from March 9, 2017.

== Plot ==
Story about a girl Nan-hee (Kim Seul-gi) who does not believe in herself because she feels she does not look as pretty as others. One day she receives a ring which holds a family secret. Due to the magical ring, she gets Se-gun (Ahn Hyo-seop) who's a handsome guy but has a cold-blooded personality to see her as his ideal type.

== Cast ==
=== Main ===
- Kim Seul-gi as Mo Nan-hee
- Ahn Hyo-seop as Park Se-geon

=== Supporting ===
- Yoon So-hee as Kang Mi-joo
- Hwang Jung-min as Moon Je-hwa
- Jeon No-min as Mo Joong-hun
- Lee Tae-sun as Byun Tae-hyun
- Choi Tae-hwan as Ma Deuk-chan
- Kim Min-young as Pi On-hwa
- Cho Soo-hyang as Girlfriend with a ring

=== Cameo ===
- Kim So-hye as Park Se-gun's ex-girlfriend, member of fictional girl group I.Q.I (episode 1)
- Kwak Si-yang as Professional model (episode 5)
- Song Hae-na as Professional model (episode 5)
- Kang Ki-young as Fashion show manager (episode 5)
- Lee Yeon-soo as Park Se-gun's mother

== Production ==
The drama is pre-produced and a co-production between Naver and iMBC.

The director Kwon Sung-chan is known for his drama One More Happy Ending, and the drama is the second work for the screenwriter Kim A-jung, after writing the scenario for Divorce Lawyer in Love drama.

First script reading took place in October, 2016 at MBC Broadcasting Station in Sangam, South Korea.

== Ratings ==
- In the table below, the blue numbers represent the lowest ratings and the red numbers represent the highest ratings.
- NR denotes that the drama did not rank in the top 20 daily programs on that date.

Ep.	Date	Average audience share	
Ep.	Date	TNmS	AGB Nielsen
MBC
1	March 9, 2017	2.4% (NR)	1.9% (NR)
2	March 9, 2017	2.1% (NR)	1.9% (NR)
3	March 16, 2017	2.1% (NR)	1.6% (NR)
4	March 16, 2017	1.8% (NR)	1.5% (NR)
5	March 23, 2017	2.5% (NR)	2.4% (NR)
6	March 23, 2017	2.4% (NR)	2.5% (NR)
Average		2.2%	2.0%
