= Three Color Fantasy =

2017 South Korean television series

- Promotional Poster
- Genre: Romance; Fantasy
- Written by: Kim Ji-hyun (The Universe's Star); Park Eun-young, Park Hee-kwon (Romance Full of Life); Kim Ah-jung (Queen of the Ring)
- Directed by: Kim Ji-hyun (The Universe's Star); Park Sang-hoon (Romance Full of Life); Kwon Sung-chang (Queen of the Ring)
- Starring: Kim Jun-myeon, Ji Woo (The Universe's Star); Yoon Shi-yoon, Cho Soo-hyang (Romance Full of Life); Kim Seul-gi, Ahn Hyo-seop (Queen of the Ring)
- Country of origin: South Korea
- Original language: Korean
- No. of episodes: 18 (MBC)

Production
- Executive producers: Park Sung-eun (MBC); Kim Tae-wook (Naver)
- Producers: Kim Ho-joon (The Universe's Star); Lee Woo-joon (Romance Full of Life); Yoo Hyun-joong (Queen of the Ring)
- Production companies: MBC; Naver

Original release
- Network: MBC; Naver TV Cast
- Release: January 26 – March 23, 2017 (MBC)

Related
- The Universe's Star; Romance Full of Life; Queen of the Ring

Three Color Fantasy (Korean: 세가지 색 판타지; RR: Segaji saek pantaji) is a South Korean Three-color drama trilogy by MBC and Naver consisting of three mini television series The Universe's Star (White), Romance Full of Life (Green) and Queen of the Ring (Gold). The dramas started airing on Naver TV Cast every Tuesday at midnight starting on January 24 and on MBC every Thursday at 23:10 (KST) starting on January 26, 2017.

== Parts ==
Color	Title	Dates	Main cast
White	The Universe's Star	January 24 – February 7, 2017 (Naver); January 26 – February 9, 2017 (MBC)	Kim Jun-myeon Ji Woo
Green	Romance Full of Life	February 14 to 28, 2017 (Naver); February 16 – March 2, 2017 (MBC)	Yoon Shi-yoon Cho Soo-hyang
Gold	Queen of the Ring	March 7 to 21, 2017 (Naver); March 9 to 23, 2017 (MBC)	Kim Seul-gi Ahn Hyo-seop

== Production ==
The drama trilogy was entirely pre-produced and co-produced between Naver and iMBC.

The Universe's Star was written and directed by Kim Ji-hyun who is known for Splash Splash Love, which won an award at the 20th AsiaTV Awards as the best short drama.

Romance Full of Life marks the directing debut of the director Park Sang-hoon and his second work after directing the movie A Mere Life. The screenwriter Park Eun-young is known for his drama Hwarang: The Poet Warrior Youth.

Queen of the Ring's director Kwon Sung-chan is known for his drama One More Happy Ending, and the drama is the second work for the screenwriter Kim A-jung, after writing the scenario for Divorce Lawyer in Love drama.

The first script reading for the dramas took place in September and in October at MBC Broadcasting Station in Sangam, South Korea.

== Ratings ==
- In the table below, the blue numbers represent the lowest ratings and the red numbers represent the highest ratings.
- NR denotes that the drama did not rank in the top 20 daily programs on that date.

Ep.	Date	Average audience share	
Ep.	Date	TNmS	AGB Nielsen
The Universe's Star
1	January 26, 2017	2.1% (NR)	1.4% (NR)
2	January 26, 2017	2.1% (NR)	1.0% (NR)
3	February 2, 2017	1.7% (NR)	2.4% (NR)
4	February 2, 2017	1.1% (NR)	1.5% (NR)
5	February 9, 2017	1.3% (NR)	1.2% (NR)
6	February 9, 2017	0.8% (NR)	1.0% (NR)
Average		1.5%	1.4%
Romance Full of Life
1	February 16, 2017	1.8% (NR)	2.1% (NR)
2	February 16, 2017	1.9% (NR)	2.9% (NR)
3	February 23, 2017	1.7% (NR)	1.8% (NR)
4	February 23, 2017	2.0% (NR)	1.7% (NR)
5	March 2, 2017	1.6% (NR)	1.4% (NR)
6	March 2, 2017	1.2% (NR)	1.2% (NR)
Average		1.7%	1.9%
Queen of the Ring
1	March 9, 2017	2.4% (NR)	1.9% (NR)
2	March 9, 2017	2.1% (NR)	1.9% (NR)
3	March 16, 2017	2.1% (NR)	1.6% (NR)
4	March 16, 2017	1.8% (NR)	1.5% (NR)
5	March 23, 2017	2.5% (NR)	2.4% (NR)
6	March 23, 2017	2.4% (NR)	2.5% (NR)
Average		2.2%	2.0%
