= Like Water =

Like Water may refer to:

- Anderson Silva: Like Water, a documentary about Brazilian mixed martial artist Anderson Silva
- "Like Water" (Ladi6 song), a 2011 single by Ladi6
- Like Water (EP), a 2021 EP by South Korean singer Wendy
  - "Like Water" (Wendy song), the title track from the EP
- Like Water (novel), a 2017 novel by Rebecca Podos

== See also ==
- Jeet Kune Do, the martial art of being like water
- Be Like Water, a 2008 play
- Like (disambiguation)
- Water (disambiguation)
