= Let's Love (Suho song) =

2020 single by Suho

Single by Suho

from the album Self-Portrait
- Released: March 30, 2020
- Recorded: 2020
- Studio: Doobdoob (Seoul); Prelude (Seoul); SM Yellow Tail (Seoul); The Vibe (Seoul)
- Genre: Rock
- Length: 3:49
- Label: SM; Dreamus
- Composers: Oiaisle; Park Moon-chi; Noday
- Lyricists: Noday; Oiaisle; Park Moon-chi; SH2O

Suho singles chronology
"Let's Love" (2020)	"Grey Suit" (2022)

Music video
- "Let's Love" on YouTube

"Let's Love" is a song recorded by South Korean singer Suho. It was released on March 30, 2020, by SM Entertainment as the lead single of his debut EP, Self-Portrait (2020).

== Composition ==
"Let's Love" was described as a modern rock song with a warm atmosphere. The lyrics convey a message about mustering the courage to express love, even if you feel clumsy or inadequate.

== Commercial performance ==
Upon release, "Let's Love" topped the real-time charts of various major Korean music platforms. The track debuted at number seven on the Gaon Digital Chart for the chart ending April 4, 2020.

== Credits and personnel ==
Credits adapted from the EP's liner notes.

Studio

- SM Yellow Tail Studio – recording
- Doobdoob Studio – recording
- The Vibe Studio – recording
- Prelude Studio – recording
- SM Big Shot Studio – engineered for mix
- SM Concert Hall Studio – mixing
- 821 Sound – mastering

Personnel

- SM Entertainment – executive producer
- Lee Soo-man – producer
- Lee Sung-soo – production director, executive supervisor
- Tak Young-jun – executive supervisor
- Yoo Young-jin – music and sound supervisor
- Suho – vocals, lyrics
- Oiaisle – lyrics, composition, vocal directing, background vocals
- Noday – lyrics, composition, vocal directing
- Park Moon-chi – lyrics, composition, arrangement, vocal directing
- Kim Seung-ho – drums
- Choi In-sung – bass guitar
- Lee Seong-ryeol – guitar
- Kim Dong-min – guitar
- Noh Min-ji – recording
- Min Sung-soo – recording
- Oh Hyun-seok – recording
- Lee Chang-sun – recording
- Ahn Young-kim – recording assistant
- Jeong Yoo-ra – digital editing
- Lee Min-kyu – engineered for mix
- Nam Koong-jin – mixing
- Kwon Nam-woo – mastering

== Charts ==
Chart performance for "Let's Love"
Chart (2020)	Peak position
South Korea (Gaon)	7
South Korea (K-pop Hot 100)	19

== Accolades ==
Music program awards
Program	Date	Ref.
Music Bank (KBS)	April 10, 2020	
Show! Music Core (MBC)	April 11, 2020	
Inkigayo (SBS)	April 12, 2020	

== Release history ==
Release history and formats for "Let's Love"
Region	Date	Format	Label
South Korea	March 30, 2020	Digital download; streaming	SM; Dreamus
Various	March 30, 2020	Digital download; streaming	SM

== See also ==
- List of Music Bank Chart winners (2020)
