= 1 to 3 =

- Digital cover

EP by Suho
- Released: May 31, 2024
- Studios: Doobdoob (Seoul); SM Aube (Seoul); SM Big Shot (Seoul); SM Droplet (Seoul); SM LVYIN (Seoul); SM Yellow Tail (Seoul)
- Genre: Rock
- Length: 22:14
- Language: Korean
- Labels: SM; Kakao
- Producers: Alex Bilo; Bjørn & Scheffmann; Cryinstereo; David Davis; Ejae; Gila; Junny; Michael Kamerman; Oiaisle; Parkmoonchi; John Ofa Rhee; Imad Royal; Hukky Shibaseki

Suho chronology
Grey Suit (2022)	1 to 3 (2024)	Who Are You (2025)

Singles from 1 to 3
- 1. "Cheese" Released: May 20, 2024; 2. "1 to 3" Released: May 31, 2024

1 to 3 (Korean: 점선면; RR: Jeomseonmyeon; lit. 'Dotted line') is the third extended play by South Korean singer-songwriter Suho. It was released on May 31, 2024, by SM Entertainment. The EP contains seven tracks including the two singles, "1 to 3" and "Cheese" featuring Wendy.

== Background and release ==
On May 3, 2024, SM Entertainment released the teaser and schedule posters for Suho's third EP 1 to 3. It was also announced that the EP would feature two singles: "1 to 3" and "Cheese" (featuring Wendy), with the latter releasing on May 20, and the former, along with the EP on May 31. In addition, he also include in the schedule his soundtrack titled "Love You More Gradually" for the drama he starring in. On May 17, SM released a teaser poster for the EP's first title track "Cheese" which featured Wendy of Red Velvet and would be releasing on May 20. Two days later, the music video teaser was released. On May 20, the first single "Cheese" featuring Wendy was released along with its music video. On May 24, the track listing was revealed alongside a highlight medley video. On May 30, the music video teaser for "1 to 3" was released. The EP and the song of the same title along with its music video were released digitally on May 31 while its physical album was issued on June 3, and a tape version on June 10.

== Composition ==
1 to 3 consists of a total of seven tracks. The opening track, "Mayday", is a "dreamy psychedelic" alternative rock song with a "string sound" of a "beautiful yet sad melody" and the lyrics "depict a journey to find a soulmate who has set off together towards the same dream in the middle of an infinite universe". The second track, "1 to 3", is a British rock song with "disco-style funky guitar" and "bass riffs", and the lyrics "describe a space that gradually expands into dots, lines, and planes, like different dimensions". The third track, "Cheese", is a pop rock song with an attractive "bouncy melody" and "three-dimensional instrument sound", and the lyrics compare a relationship with an old lover to 'cheese', and the song "breaks abruptly when it is cold, but stretches out when it is hot". In addition, the song features Wendy of Red Velvet. The fourth track, "Wishful Thinking", is an alternative rock song with a "simple rhythm" and "cool vibe melody", expressing "honest emotions in the face of distorted reality". It contains the "paradoxical desire to live calmly with hope, even if it is hidden". The fifth track, "Moonlight", is an indie rock song characterized by a harmony of "rhythmic acoustic guitar", "cheerful electric guitar", and "easy and comfortable melody", and is a "praise for youth that everyone can become the protagonist of their own life and achieve their dreams". The sixth track, "Alright Alright", is a surf rock and funky rock and roll song, and the lyrics "express the ambition to break away from universal standards and live according to Peter Pan, the 'romantic' in his heart". Giriboy rapped on the track, which was said to make the song "complete". The closing track, "Zero Gravity", is an alternative rock song that aims to provide the "excitement of being liberated from the Earth's gravity", and the lyrics contain the "story of the moment when a soulmate is miraculously reunited in the middle of the universe".

== Track listing ==
1 to 3 track listing
No.	Title	Lyrics	Music	Arrangement	Length
1.	"Mayday"	Lee Seu-ran; SH2O	David Davis; Josef Lamercier; Barney Bones; Kosta	Davis; Lamercier; Bones; Kosta; Imlay	3:25
2.	"1 to 3" (점선면; Jeomseonmyeon; 'Dotted line')	Danke; SH2O; Hukky Shibaseki; Lee Jae; Oiaisle	Shibaseki; Lee Jae; Oiaisle	Shibaseki; Lee; Oiaisle	3:40
3.	"Cheese" (치즈; Chijeu); (featuring Wendy))	Noday; Gila; Oiaisle; Park Moon-chi; SH2O	Oiaisle; Park; Noday; Gila	Park; Gila	3:06
4.	"Wishful Thinking"	Ceramic Office (Artiffect); SH2O	Daniel Scheffmann; Ole Bjørn Heiring Albertsen; Maximillian	Scheffmann; Bjørn	2:51
5.	"Moonlight"	Kelbyul (153/Joombas); SH2O	Imad Royal; Grant Averill; Anthony Rossomando	Royal	3:11
6.	"Alright Alright" (featuring Giriboy)	Song Chae-ri(153/Joombas); Giriboy; SH2O	Michael Kamerman; Alex Bilo; Lillian Caputo; Giriboy	Kamerman; Bilo	2:35
7.	"Zero Gravity" (무중력; lit. 'Weightless')	Lee Hyung-suk (PNP); SH2O	Junny; John Ofa Rhee; Cryinstereo	Cryinstereo; Rhee; Junny	3:25
Total length:					22:14

== Charts ==
=== Weekly charts ===
Weekly chart performance for 1 to 3
Chart (2024)	Peak position
Japanese Albums (Oricon)	27
Japanese Hot Albums (Billboard Japan)	32
South Korean Albums (Circle)	3

=== Monthly charts ===
Monthly chart performance for 1 to 3
Chart (2024)	Peak position
South Korean Albums (Circle)	14

== Release history ==
Release history for 1 to 3
Region	Date	Format	Label
Various	May 31, 2024	Digital download; streaming	SM
South Korea	June 3, 2024	CD	SM; Kakao
South Korea	June 10, 2024	Tape	SM; Kakao
