= Wendy (singer) =

South Korean singer (born 1994)

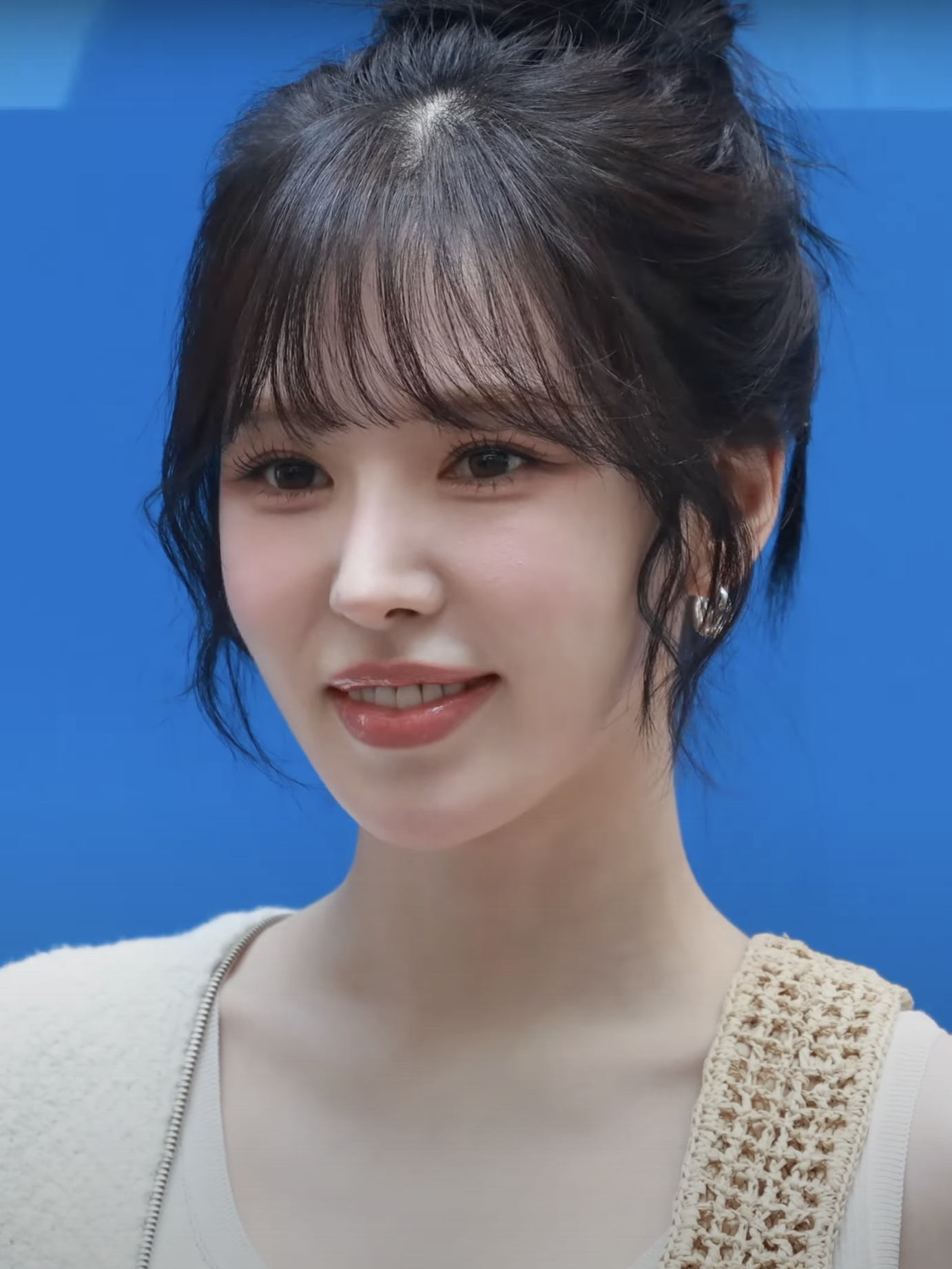
- Wendy in 2025
- Born: Shon Seung-wan; February 21, 1994 (age 32); Seoul, South Korea
- Other name: Wendy Shon
- Occupation: Singer
- Years active: 2014–present
- Musical career
- Genre: K-pop
- Instrument: Vocals
- Labels: SM; Asnd
- Member of: Red Velvet; Got the Beat
- Formerly of: SM Rookies; SM Town

Korean name
- Hangul: 손승완
- Hanja: 孫承完
- RR: Son Seungwan
- MR: Son Sŭngwan

Signature
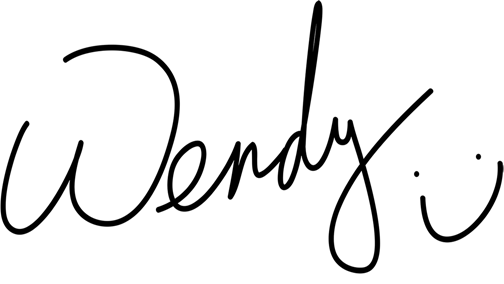

Shon Seung-wan (Korean: 손승완; born February 21, 1994), known professionally as Wendy (웬디), is a South Korean singer. She is a member of the South Korean girl group Red Velvet. In 2021, she made her solo debut with the EP Like Water. In 2022, she became a member of SM Entertainment's supergroup Got the Beat.

Apart from her music career, Wendy has made various television appearances, including as a panelist on the reality show We Got Married (2015–2016), Trick & True (2016–2017), being cast on comedy show Saturday Night Live Korea (2021), and hosting Mysterious Record Shop (2021). From 2021 to 2023, Wendy hosted the radio program Wendy's Youngstreet. She made her theatrical debut in the musical Rebecca in 2023 and in 2025, started the web show Today is Wendy.

== Early life and education ==
Wendy was born on February 21, 1994, in Seongbuk-dong, a neighborhood in Seongbuk District in Seoul, South Korea. Coming from a family of music lovers, Wendy showed interest in becoming a singer when she was only six years old. Besides her passion for singing, she is also able to play several instruments, including the piano, guitar, flute, and saxophone.

She lived with her family in Jecheon until her fifth year of elementary school, when she moved to Canada with her older sister, Shon Seung-hee, to study abroad. She lived in Brockville, Ontario before moving to the United States to attend Shattuck-Saint Mary's in Faribault, Minnesota, where she was an honor student and athlete, and earned various awards for academics and music-related activities. There, she started using her English name 'Wendy Shon'. Returning to Canada, she later studied at Richmond Hill High School in Richmond Hill, Ontario, where she participated in the school's show choir called Vocal Fusion. While living in both countries, she became fluent in English.

Her parents were initially against her pursuing a career in music and wanted her to focus on her studies, but while she was still in high school, they eventually allowed her to audition to become a singer in South Korea.

== Career ==
=== 2010–2014: Pre-debut ===
In 2010, she submitted an online audition for Koreaboo's Global Auditions in 2011 with Cube Entertainment. Though she was not the final winner, she was one of fifteen finalists personally picked by Korean singer G.NA and Koreaboo from over 5,000 videos to continue to the final round in Vancouver, British Columbia, Canada, and open for G.NA's first solo showcase. In 2018, YG Entertainment founder Yang Hyun-suk revealed Wendy once auditioned for the company but was not accepted.

Wendy originally did not intend to audition for SM Entertainment, but was cast by the company when she accompanied a friend to the SM Global Audition in Canada in 2012. She recalled singing Kim Gun-mo's "Moon of Seoul" and passed. She trained for less than two years before she was introduced as a member of S.M. Entertainment's predebut group SM Rookies on March 14, 2014. As part of SM Rookies, Wendy released the song "Because I Love You" for the soundtrack of the Mnet drama Mimi and appeared in the song's music video.

=== 2014–2019: Debut with Red Velvet and solo activities ===
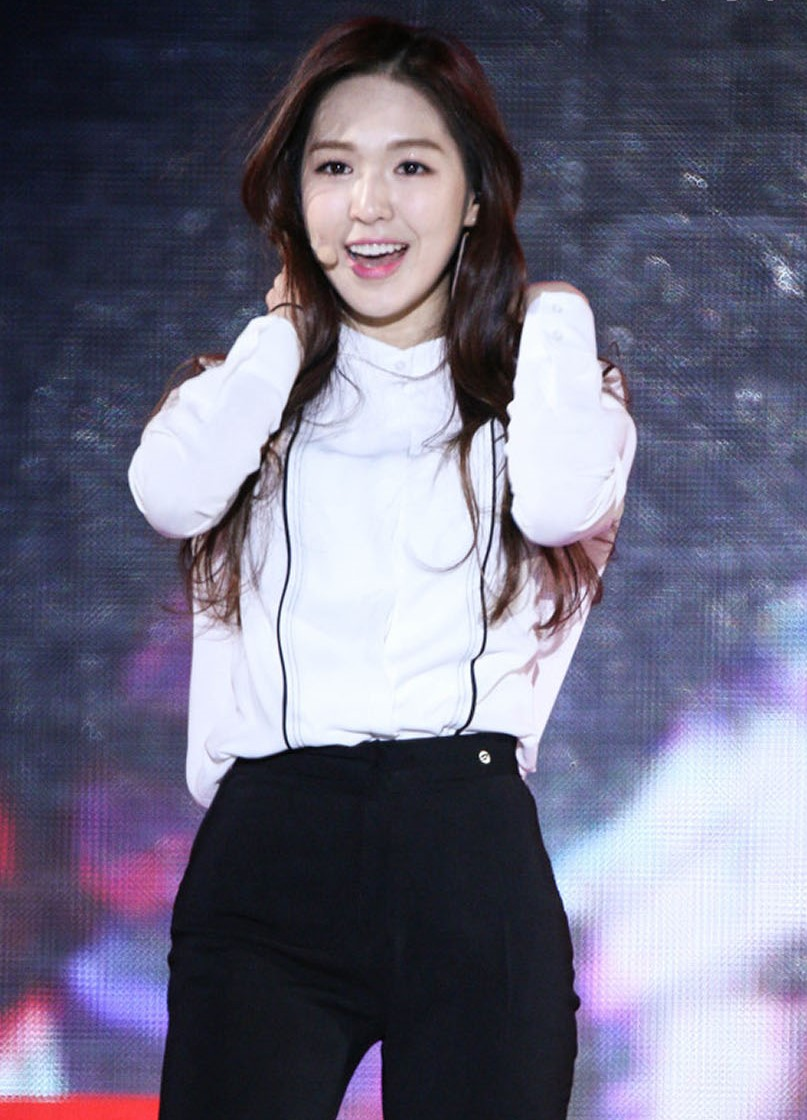
Wendy during a concert in December 2014

On August 1, 2014, Wendy made her official debut as a member of Red Velvet.

Wendy collaborated with rapper Yuk Jidam for the song "Return", part of the OST of KBS2's Who Are You: School 2015. The song was released on June 8, 2015, and debuted at number 31 on the Gaon Digital Chart. She released another song "Let You Know" for the soundtrack of the JTBC drama D-Day on October 16.

In January 2016, Wendy became a long-term panelist on We Got Married and participated in King of Mask Singer as a contestant under the alias "Space Beauty Maetel". In March 2016, she collaborated with Eric Nam on a duet titled "Spring Love", as part of SM Entertainment's SM Station project. The song peaked at number 7 on South Korea's Gaon Digital Chart. In July 2016, Wendy and her Red Velvet bandmate Seulgi released an original soundtrack titled "Don't Push Me" for the TV drama series Uncontrollably Fond. In October 2016, she became a fixed panelist for the KBS show Trick & True together with her bandmate Irene. In December 2016, Wendy participated in two other singles for the SM Station project, "Have Yourself a Merry Little Christmas", featuring pianist Moon Jung-jae and violinist Nile Lee, and "Sound of Your Heart", a collaboration with several SM Entertainment artists. In the same month, she was featured in the English version of Latin pop star Ricky Martin's single "Vente Pa' Ca".

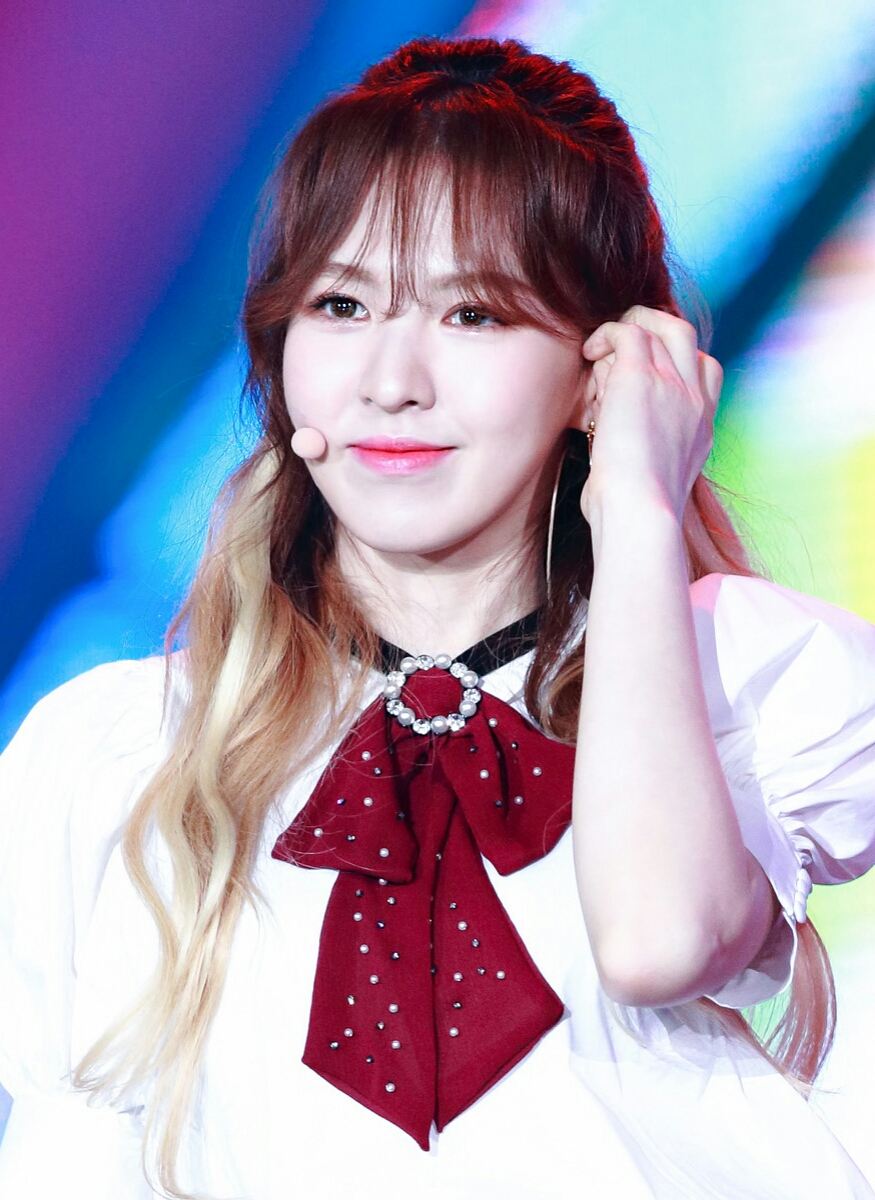
Wendy in 2017

Wendy released the song "I Can Only See You" with Seulgi in January 2017 for the OST of the KBS2 TV series, Hwarang. In February, she sang the Korean version of "My Time", part of Disney Channel's Elena of Avalor's official soundtrack. In the same month, she became the host of the KBS World show K-Rush. On October 27, she, along with Kangta and Seulgi, released a remake of the 2001 song "인형 (Doll)" by Shinhwa's Shin Hye-sung and Lee Ji-hoon as part of the second season of the SM Station project. Its music video used footage from their live performance of the song at the SM Town Live Tour V in Japan and was released on the same day. She released a duet with Baek A-yeon on December 2, called "The Little Match Girl". In February 2018, Wendy was chosen as the interactive holographic avatar of SK Telecom's new voice assistant speaker, 'Holobox'.

In June 2018, Wendy was featured with Seulgi for Battle Trip's special episode themed 'The Country I Want to Live in', in which the pair visited Austria. In July 2018, Wendy collaborated with Yang Da-il for the single "One Summer" which was released on July 2. In October, it was announced that Wendy was set to release an English duet with American singer John Legend entitled "Written in the Stars" as part of the third season of SM Station, Station x 0. The music video for the duet was released on October 19, 2018, on YouTube. In November 2018, Wendy released the song "Goodbye" for the soundtrack of JTBC drama The Beauty Inside.

On February 22, 2019, Wendy released the solo soundtrack, "What If Love", for tvN's drama Touch Your Heart. In October, Wendy participated once again in King of Mask Singer, under the alias "Green Witch".

=== 2019–2020: Stage incident and hiatus ===
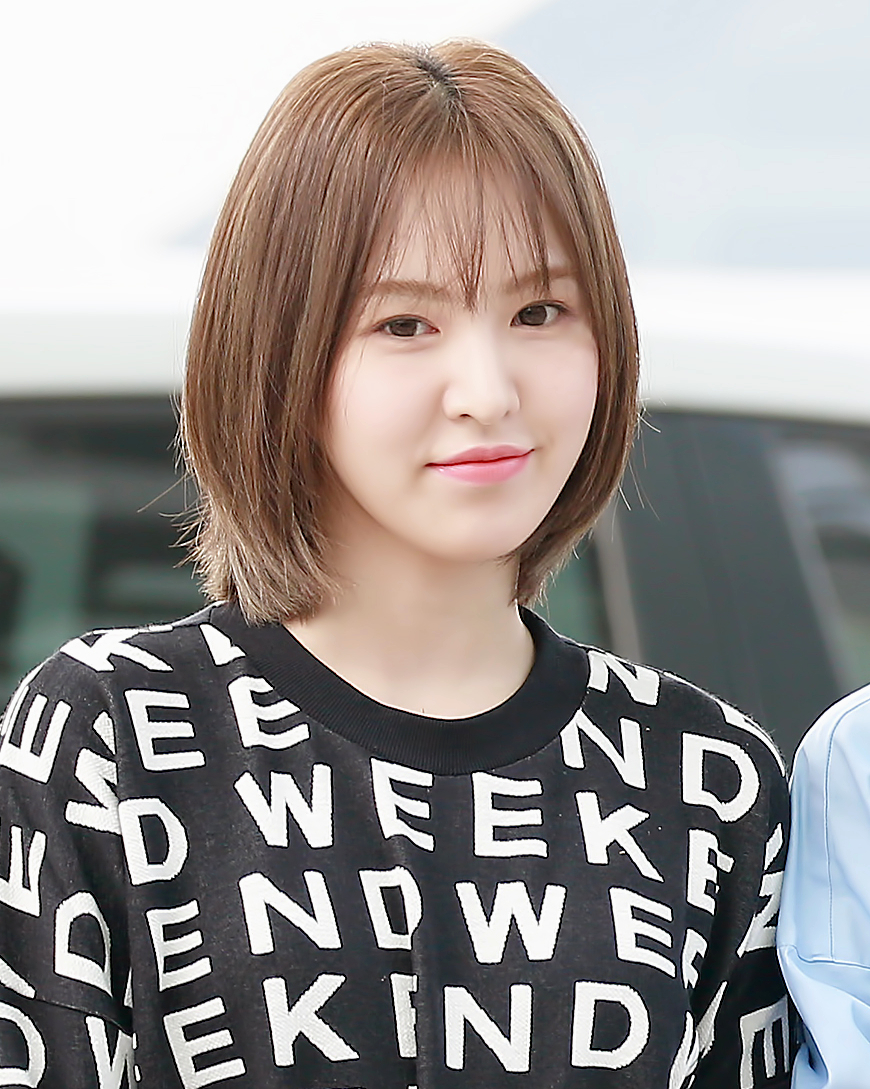
Wendy in September 2019

On December 25, 2019, Wendy was involved in a stage accident during her solo rehearsal at the 2019 SBS Gayo Daejeon. Due to an alleged lack of common safety measures by the show's crew members in the stage design, in addition to the lift stairs not being in place for the performance, she fell approximately 2.5 metres (8.2 ft). Her injuries included a pelvic fracture, a broken wrist and several facial injuries including a cracked cheekbone, with all injuries on the right side of her body. The accident and subsequent hospitalization led to cancellation of all her planned activities. In February 2020, Wendy was discharged from the hospital after spending two months recovering, and began outpatient treatment.

=== 2020–2023: Solo debut with Like Water, Wendy's Youngstreet, and Got the Beat ===
In March 2020, Wendy had her first public appearance since her accident, with an appearance on MBC Standard FM's Listen To Books. In the same month, Wendy was confirmed to take part as main voice actress for the Korean release of DreamWorks animated film Trolls: World Tour. It was released in April. In May, she collaborated with Zico for the OST of The King: Eternal Monarch titled "My Day Is Full Of You".

In November 2020, aside from Red Velvet's OST "Future" for the drama Start-Up, Wendy also had a solo OST named "Two Words". In the same month, Wendy featured in labelmate Taemin's "Be Your Enemy", which was in included in his studio album Never Gonna Dance Again.

Wendy made her return to live performances on January 1, 2021, at SM Town Live Culture Humanity. She then made her official return to television as a co-host of Mysterious Record Shop. In March 2021, it was announced that Wendy would be making her debut as a solo artist with an album releasing in April. Her first EP Like Water was released on April 5, containing a total of five songs including its lead single of the same name.

On July 12, 2021, Wendy became the permanent nightly DJ host for SBS Power FM's radio show Wendy's Youngstreet, where she had been a special DJ for in 2018. On December 27, 2021, Wendy was revealed as a member of supergroup Got the Beat alongside Red Velvet groupmate Seulgi. The group debuted on January 3, 2022.

In June 2023, it was announced that Wendy would step down as the host of Wendy's Youngstreet. In the same month, Wendy was cast as 'I' in the 10th Anniversary production of the musical Rebecca, marking her official theatre debut.

=== 2024–present: Wish You Hell and departure from SM Entertainment ===
On March 12, 2024, Wendy released her second extended play Wish You Hell and its lead single of the same name. In November 2024, she featured on BTS Jin's song "Heart on the Window" from his EP Happy.

On April 4, 2025, SM Entertainment announced that its exclusive contract with Wendy had ended, but she will remain in Red Velvet and be involved in all future group activities. On April 25, 2025, it was announced that Wendy signed an exclusive contract with Asnd. On August 25, it was announced that Wendy would be releasing her third extended play Cerulean Verge on September 10. On September 20, Wendy began her first world tour, W:ealive, in Seoul. The tour is scheduled to consist of 17 shows and conclude in Manila on January 17.

Wendy contributed the track "Daydream" to the original soundtrack for the Netflix series Can This Love Be Translated?, which follows the romance between interpreter Joo Ho-jin and actress Cha Mu-hee. Released on January 16, 2026, the soundtrack placed three songs on the Melon OST chart as of February 2, including Wendy's track. The song was part of the setlist of Wendy's World Tour "W:EALIVE" Encore concerts on February 28 and March 1, 2026. Later that year, on September 5, "Daydream" was featured during the thirty-minute fireworks finale of the Seoul World Fireworks Festival at Yeouido Hangang Park, part of a collaboration between Netflix Korea and Hanwha.

On November 9, 2026, it was announced that Wendy would release her fourth extended play Gleam Hour on November 23.

== Other activities ==
=== Endorsements ===
Aside from endorsements with Red Velvet as a group, Wendy, in November 2018, became an endorser of Dongwon Yangban Rice Porridge with Irene.

On December 31, 2020, L'Occitane Korea launched their new campaign, "Be Happy, Smile Again", with Wendy as a muse to commemorate the launch of their Happy Shea 2021 edition. Later in February 2021, they launched another campaign for the new Pink Essence product with Wendy. In March 2021, Wendy became the new presenter of Pond's.

=== Philanthropy ===
In February 2020, Wendy donated ₩100 million through the Community Chest of Korea to help those affected by COVID-19 and became a member of its Honor Society in 2021.

In March 2025, Wendy donated ₩50 million through the Community Chest of Korea to help with recovery efforts from wildfires that have occurred in the Ulsan, Gyeongbuk, and Gyeongnam regions.

== Discography ==
=== Extended plays ===
List of EPs, showing selected details, chart positions, and sales figures
Title	Details	Peak chart positions			Sales
Title	Details	KOR	JPN	JPN Hot	Sales
Like Water	Released: April 5, 2021; Label: SM, Dreamus; Formats: CD, LP, digital download, streaming	4	35	71	KOR: 184,620; JPN: 1,289 (Phy.)
Wish You Hell	Released: March 12, 2024; Label: SM, Kakao; Formats: CD, digital download, streaming	2	33	28	KOR: 158,246; JPN: 1,179
Cerulean Verge	Released: September 10, 2025; Label: Asnd, Dreamus; Formats: CD, digital download, streaming	8	—	—	KOR: 79,810

=== Singles ===
List of singles, showing year released, selected peak positions, sales figures, and name of the album
Title	Year	Peak chart positions		Sales	Album
Title	Year	KOR	KOR Hot	Sales	Album
As lead artist
"Like Water"	2021	54	85	—N/a	Like Water
"When This Rain Stops"	2021	91	—	—N/a	Like Water
"Wish You Hell"	2024	106	—	—N/a	Wish You Hell
"Sunkiss"	2025	187	—	—N/a	Cerulean Verge
Collaborations
"One Dream One Korea" (with various artists)	2015	—	—	—N/a	Charity single
"Spring Love" (봄인가 봐) (with Eric Nam)	2016	7	—	KOR: 820,131	SM Station Season 1
"Have Yourself a Merry Little Christmas" (with Moon Jung-jae and Nile Lee)	2016	—	—	—N/a	SM Station Season 1
"Sound of Your Heart" (너의 목소리) (with Yesung, Sunny, Luna, Seulgi, Taeil, Doyoung, and Steve Barakatt)	2016	—	—	—N/a	SM Station Season 1
"Doll" (인형) (with Kangta and Seulgi)	2017	—	—	—N/a	SM Station Season 2
"The Little Match Girl" (성냥팔이 소녀) (with Baek A-yeon)	2017	55	—	KOR: 59,483	SM Station Season 2
"One Summer" (그해 여름) (with Yang Da-il)	2018	40	—	—N/a	Non-album single
"Written in the Stars" (with John Legend)	2018	— (Note: "Written in the Stars" did not enter the Gaon Digital Chart but peaked at position 97 on the component domestic Download Chart.)	—	—N/a	SM Station X 0
"This Is Your Day (for every child, UNICEF)" (with various artists)	2019	—	—	—N/a	SM Station X
"Be Deep" (깊어지네) (with Son Tae-jin)	2021	—	—	—N/a	Non-album singles
"Airport Goodbyes" (공항로) (with the production of The Black Skirts)	2021	— (Note: "Airport Goodbyes" did not enter the Gaon Digital Chart but peaked at position 70 on the component domestic Download Chart.)	—	—N/a	Non-album singles
"Miracle" (안부) (with MeloMance)	2023	170	—	—N/a	SM Station Season 4
As featured artist
"Vente Pa' Ca" (English Version) (Ricky Martin feat. Wendy)	2016	—	—	—N/a	Non-album single
"Be Your Enemy" (Taemin feat. Wendy)	2020	— (Note: "Be Your Enemy" did not enter the Gaon Digital Chart but peaked at position 77 on the component Download Chart.)	—	—N/a	Never Gonna Dance Again: Act 2
"Move Mood Mode" (Taeyong feat. Wendy)	2023	— (Note: "Move Mood Mode" did not enter the Circle Digital Chart, but peaked at number 157 on the Download Chart.)	—	—N/a	Shalala
"55" (Code Kunst feat. Wendy, Baek Ye-rin)	2023	99	—	—N/a	Remember Archive
"Cheese" (Suho feat. Wendy)	2024	— (Note: "Cheese" did not enter the Circle Digital Chart, but peaked at number 78 on the Download Chart.)	—	—N/a	1 to 3
"Your Lips" (Jun. K feat. Wendy)	2026	— (Note: "Your Lips" did not chart on the Circle Digital Chart, but peaked at number 80 on the Download Chart.)	—	—N/a	Non-album single
"—" denotes releases that did not chart or were not released in that region.

=== Soundtrack appearances ===
List of soundtracks, showing year released, selected peak positions, sales figures, and name of the album
Title	Year	Peak chart positions	Sales	Album
Title	Year	KOR	Sales	Album
"Because I Love You" (슬픔 속에 그댈 지워야만 해)	2014	—	KOR: 18,758	Mimi OST
"Return" (with Yuk Jidam)	2015	31	KOR: 93,844	Who Are You: School 2015 OST
"Let You Know" (아나요)	2015	139	KOR: 20,824	D-Day OST
"Don't Push Me" (밀지마) (with Seulgi)	2016	25	KOR: 182,984	Uncontrollably Fond OST
"I Can Only See You" (너만보여) (with Seulgi)	2017	80	KOR: 24,912	Hwarang OST
"My Time" (Korean Version)	2017	—	—N/a	Elena of Avalor OST
"Goodbye"	2018	31	—N/a	The Beauty Inside OST
"What If Love"	2019	158	—N/a	Touch Your Heart OST
"My Day Is Full of You" (나의 하루는 다 너로 가득해) (with Zico)	2020	148	—N/a	The King: Eternal Monarch OST
"Two Words" (두 글자)	2020	143	—N/a	Start-Up OST
"If I Could Read Your Mind" (나를 신경 쓰고 있는 건가)	2021	— (Note: "If I Could Read Your Mind" did not enter the Gaon Digital Chart but peaked at position 83 on the component Download Chart and debuted at position 74 on the component BGM chart.)	—N/a	Yumi's Cells OST Part 1
"Girls"	2022	— (Note: "Girls" did not enter the Gaon Digital Chart but peaked at position 141 on the component Download Chart and debuted at position 101 on the component BGM chart.)	—N/a	Seoul Check-in OST Part 1
"Noblesse"	2022	— (Note: "Noblesse" did not enter the Circle Digital Chart but peaked at position 119 on the component Download Chart and debuted at position 143 on the component BGM chart.)	—N/a	Adele OST
"Blazing Steps"	2025	—	—N/a	Marry My Husband Japan OST
"Daydream"	2026	76	—N/a	Can This Love Be Translated? OST
"My Everything"	2026	— (Note: "My Everything" did not enter the Circle Digital Chart, but peaked at number 53 on the Download Chart.)	—N/a	No Tail to Tell OST
"—" denotes releases that did not chart or were not released in that region.

=== Other charted songs ===
List of songs, showing year released, selected peak positions, sales figures, and name of the album
Title	Year	Peak chart positions	Album
Title	Year	KOR	Album
"Why Can't You Love Me?"	2021	200	Like Water
"The Road" (초행길)	2021	— (Note: "The Road" did not enter the Gaon Digital Chart but peaked at position 38 on the component Download Chart.)	Like Water
"Best Friend" (with Seulgi)	2021	— (Note: "Best Friend" did not enter the Gaon Digital Chart but peaked at position 34 on the component Download Chart.)	Like Water
"That Place in Between" (그 사이)	2021	— (Note: "That Place in Between" did not enter the Gaon Digital Chart but peaked at position 199 on the component Download Chart.)	Morning Dew 50th Anniversary Tribute to Kim Min-Gi, Vol. 3
"His Car Isn't Yours"	2024	— (Note: "His Car Isn't Yours" did not enter the Circle Digital Chart, but peaked at number 60 on the Download Chart.)	Wish You Hell
"Best Ever"	2024	— (Note: "Best Ever" did not enter the Circle Digital Chart, but peaked at number 59 on the Download Chart.)	Wish You Hell
"Better Judgment"	2024	— (Note: "Better Judgement" did not enter the Circle Digital Chart, but peaked at number 65 on the Download Chart.)	Wish You Hell
"Queen Of The Party"	2024	— (Note: "Queen Of The Party" did not enter the Circle Digital Chart, but peaked at number 53 on the Download Chart.)	Wish You Hell
"Vermilion"	2024	— (Note: "Vermilion" did not enter the Circle Digital Chart, but peaked at number 64 on the Download Chart.)	Wish You Hell
"Heart on the Window" (with Jin)	2024	139	Happy
"Fireproof"	2025	— (Note: "Fireproof" did not enter the Circle Digital Chart, but peaked at number 78 on the Download Chart.)	Cerulean Verge
"Existential Crisis"	2025	— (Note: "Existential Crisis" did not enter the Circle Digital Chart, but peaked at number 75 on the Download Chart.)	Cerulean Verge
"Hate²"	2025	— (Note: "Hate²" did not enter the Circle Digital Chart, but peaked at number 77 on the Download Chart.)	Cerulean Verge
"Chapter You"	2025	— (Note: "Chapter You" did not enter the Circle Digital Chart, but peaked at number 81 on the Download Chart.)	Cerulean Verge
"Believe"	2025	— (Note: "Believe" did not enter the Circle Digital Chart, but peaked at number 79 on the Download Chart.)	Cerulean Verge
"—" denotes releases that did not chart or were not released in that region.

=== Composition credits ===
All song credits are adapted from the Korea Music Copyright Association's database unless stated otherwise.

Name of the song, year released, artist, and name of the album
Song	Year	Artist	Album	Credited		Ref
Song	Year	Artist	Album	Lyricist	Composition	Ref
"Close to Me (Remix)"	2019	Ellie Goulding, Diplo & Red Velvet	Non-album single	Yes	No	
"Existential Crisis"	2025	Herself	Cerulean Verge	Yes	No	—
"Hate²"	2025	Herself	Cerulean Verge	Yes	Yes	—

== Videography ==
=== Music videos ===
List of music videos, showing year released
Title	Year	Ref.
"Because I Love You" (OST of Mimi)	2014	
"My Time" (Kor. version OST of Elena of Avalor)	2017	
"Like Water"	2021	
"Wish You Hell"	2024	
"Sunkiss"	2025	
Collaborations
"Spring Love" (with Eric Nam)	2016	
"Have Yourself a Merry Little Christmas" (with Moon Jung-jae and Nile Lee)	2016	
"The Little Match Girl" (with Baek A-yeon)	2017	
"Written in the Stars" (with John Legend)	2018	
"This Is Your Day (for every child, UNICEF)" (with various artist)	2019	
As featured artist
"Cheese" (Suho feat. Wendy)	2024	

== Filmography ==
=== Film ===
Year	Title	Role	Notes	Ref.
2015	SMTown: The Stage	Herself	Documentary film	
2020	Trolls World Tour	Wani (voice)	Animated film	
2020	Trolls World Tour	Queen Poppy (voice)	Korean-dubbed version of the Animated film	
2023	Trolls Band Together	Queen Poppy (voice)	Korean-dubbed version of the Animated film	

=== Television drama ===
Year	Title	Role	Note	Ref.
2016	Descendants of the Sun	Herself	Cameo (Episode 16)	

=== Television shows ===
Year	Title	Role	Notes	Ref.
2015	100 People, 100 Songs	Contestant	With Seulgi	
2015	Immortal Songs: Singing the Legend	Contestant	Goodbye with Seulgi and Joy (Episodes 223–224)	
2015–2016	We Got Married	Panelist		
2016	King of Mask Singer	Contestant	As "Space Beauty Maetel" (Episode 43)	
2016–2017	Trick & True	Panelist		
2017	Girl Group Battle	Contestant	With Seulgi and Joy (Korean New Year Special)	
2017	Raid the Convenience Store	Host	Pilot episode	
2017	K-Rush	Host	Episodes 1–4	
2018	Battle Trip	Cast	With Seulgi (Episodes 100–103)	
2019	King of Mask Singer	Contestant	As "Green Witch" (Episodes 225–226)	
2021	Mysterious Record Shop	Host	with Yoon Jong-shin, Jang Yoon-jeong and Kyuhyun	
2022	Immortal Songs: Singing the Legend	Contestant	Living in the Same Time by Naul (Episode 578)	
2024	Build Up: Vocal Boy Group Survival	Judge		
2024	Song Stealer	Contestant	New year's pilot episode	
2024	The Ddandara	Mentor	With Park Jin-Young, Cha Tae-hyun, Kim Ha-neul	
2025	Bangpan Music: Wherever You Go	Performer	With Lee Chan-Won, Han-hae, Danny-Goo	

=== Web shows ===
Year	Title	Role	Ref.
2021	Saturday Night Live Korea	Cast member	

=== Radio shows ===
Year	Title	Role	Note	Ref.
2015	Kiss the Radio	Special DJ	With Seulgi	
2018	NCT Night Night	Special DJ		
2018	Youngstreet	Special DJ		
2020	Listen to Books	Special DJ		
2021–2023; 2024–present	Wendy's Youngstreet	DJ	First hosting from July 2021 – July 2023; Return hosting in August 2024	

== Theatre ==
Year	Production	Role	Venue	Notes	Ref.
2023	Rebecca das Musical	Ich	Shinhan Card Hall in Blue Square, Seoul	Korean Premiere Production	

== Concerts and tours ==
=== Headlining ===
- W:ealive (2025–2026)

== Awards and nominations ==
Name of the award ceremony, year presented, category, nominee of the award, and the result of the nomination
Award ceremony	Year	Category	Nominee / Work	Result	Ref.
Asian Pop Music Awards	2024	Best Female Artist (Overseas)	"Wish You Hell"	Won	
Asian Pop Music Awards	2024	People's Choice Award (Overseas)	"Wish You Hell"	Won	
Asian Pop Music Awards	2024	Song of the Year (Overseas)	"Cheese"	Won	
Asian Pop Music Awards	2024	Top 20 Albums of the Year (Overseas)	Wish You Hell	Won	
Brand of the Year Awards	2022	Radio DJ of the Year	Wendy's Youngstreet	Won	
Brand of the Year Awards	2025	Female Radio DJ of the Year	Wendy's Youngstreet	Won	
D Awards	2025	Best Female Solo Popularity Award	Wendy	Won	
Korea First Brand Awards	2022	Radio DJ	Wendy's Youngstreet	Won	
Korean Music Awards	2022	Best Pop Song	"When This Rain Stops"	Nominated	
Mnet Asian Music Awards	2016	Best Collaboration	"Spring Love" (with Eric Nam)	Nominated	
SBS Entertainment Awards	2022	Radio DJ Award – Power FM	Wendy's Youngstreet	Won	
SEC Awards	2026	Asian Artist of the Year	Wendy	Pending	
Seoul Music Awards	2022	Ballad Award	Wendy	Won	
Seoul Music Awards	2025	Main Prize (Bonsang)	Wendy	Nominated	
Seoul Music Awards	2025	Popularity Award	Wendy	Nominated	
Seoul Music Awards	2025	K-Wave Special Award	Wendy	Nominated	
Seoul Music Awards	2025	K-pop World Choice – Solo	Wendy	Nominated	
MAMA Awards	2025	Fans' Choice Female Top 10	Wendy	Nominated	
