= When This Rain Stops =

Single by Wendy

from the album Like Water
- Language: Korean
- Released: April 5, 2021
- Studio: SM Studio, Seoul, South Korea
- Length: 4:03
- Label: SM; Dreamus
- Composer: minGtion
- Lyricist: minGtion

Wendy singles chronology
"Two Words" (2020)	"When This Rain Stops" (2021)	"Like Water" (2021)

Live video
- "When This Rain Stops" on YouTube

"When This Rain Stops" is a song recorded by South Korean singer and Red Velvet member Wendy for her first extended play, Like Water. Composed and written by minGtion, it is a slow-tempo ballad that describes Wendy's autobiographical story containing a message of sympathy and consolation. It was released on April 5, 2021, by SM Entertainment.

== Recording and composition ==
"When This Rain Stops"
"When This Rain Stops" is a slow-tempo ballad song that containing a message of sympathy and consolation.

"When This Rain Stops" was composed and written by minGtion. Crystal Bell of Teen Vogue revealed that Wendy "spent over 15 hours in the recording booth perfecting it". The singer noted that the song "brings solace to those who have been going through tough times", further adding that both "Like Water" and "When This Rain Stops" are heart-warming, but have "different temperatures and tones".

Musically, "When This Rain Stops" was described as a slow-tempo ballad driven by a piano performance. Choo Seung-hyun of Seoul Economic Daily noted the song for without using many instruments and only piano. The song is composed in the key of A-flat major with a tempo of 152 beats per minute. Lyrically, the song describes Wendy's autobiographical story containing a message of sympathy and consolation, saying, "It's okay to take a break for a while". In an interview with Spur, Wendy revealed that she wants to encourage everyone with the song.

== Promotion and reception ==
A live video clip for "When This Rain Stops" was released. The accompanying clip for the track was directed by video director Lee Wa. On April 11, 2021, Wendy performed the song on Inkigayo and M Countdown.

Following its initial release, "When This Rain Stops" was met with positive reviews from music critics. JT Early of Beats Per Minute described the track as "consistently stripped back", explaining that it "is almost impossible not to be moved by her voice alone" referring to Wendy's "vocals ascending to higher levels of strength". Jung Da-yeol of IZM praised the climax of the song in which it "stretches out coolly with the lyrics of comfort", adding that it is a "moment of joy that washes away the worries and worries that have been shadowed in a corner". Ruby C of NME noted it as an "impactful opening track", further adding her skillful showcase of "vocal strength and control". Tamar Herman of South China Morning Post described the track as a "poignant, hopeful ballad" song. In an individual song review, Kim Byung-woo, Kim Sung-hwan, and Yoo Seong-eun of Y-Magazine praised the track as it "conveys vivid emotions" explaining that the track is "mostly led by piano and Wendy's vocals", while rating the track with four stars out of five.

"When This Rain Stops" debuted at number 91 on the 15th weekly issue of South Korea's Gaon Digital Chart for 2021 during the period dated April 4–10. It also debuted at number 14 and number 105 on the Gaon Download Chart and Gaon Streaming Chart, respectively. In addition, it debuted at number 76 on the component BGM chart.

== Credits and personnel ==
Credits adapted from the liner notes of Like Water.

Studio

- Recorded and engineered for mix at SM Yellow Tail Studio
- Mixed at SM Blue Ocean Studio
- Mastered at 821 Sound Mastering

Personnel

- Wendy – vocals
- minGtion – original writer, songwriting, composition, arrangement, vocal director, piano, digital editing
- No Min-ji – recording, mixing engineer
- Kim Chul-soon – mixing
- Kwon Nam-woo – mastering

== Awards and nominations ==
Name of the award ceremony, year presented, category, and the result of the nomination
Award ceremony	Year	Category	Result	Ref.
Korean Music Awards	2022	Best Pop Song	Nominated	

== Charts ==
=== Weekly charts ===
Weekly chart performance for "When This Rain Stops"
Chart (2021)	Peak position
South Korea (Gaon)	91

=== Monthly charts ===
Monthly chart performance for "When This Rain Stops"
Chart (April 2021)	Position
South Korea (Gaon)	145

== Release history ==
Release dates and formats for "When This Rain Stops"
Region	Date	Format(s)	Label(s)	Ref.
Various	April 5, 2021	Digital download; streaming	SM Entertainment; Dreamus	
