= Jang Jae-in =

South Korean musician (born 1991)

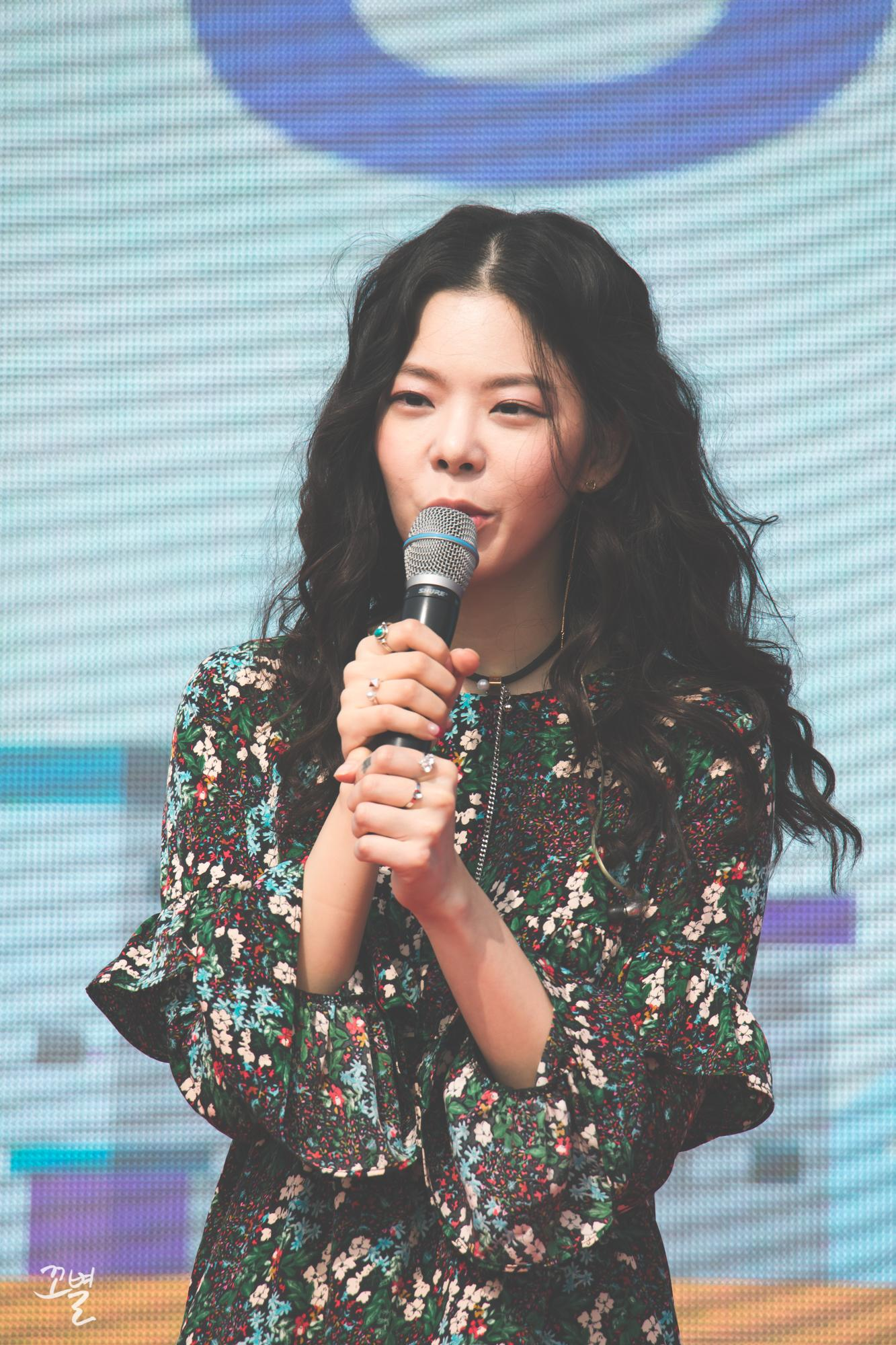
- Jang in April 2017

Background information
- Also known as: Jang Jane, Jane Jang
- Born: June 6, 1991 (age 34)
- Origin: Gwangju, South Korea
- Genres: Neo soul, ballad, folk
- Occupation: Singer-songwriter
- Instrument(s): Piano, guitar, vocals
- Years active: 2010–present
- Labels: New Era Project
- Website: Official website

Jang Jae-in (Korean: 장재인, born June 6, 1991), also known as Jang Jane, is a South Korean singer-songwriter known for her unique voice. Jang became well known after she finished third in the South Korean reality television series Superstar K 2 in 2010.

== Life and career ==
=== Early life ===
Jang was born in Gangjin-gun, Jeollanam-do, South Korea, on June 6, 1991. She began writing songs at 15. She was an outstanding student but chose to drop out of high school to pursue a music career. Her original first name was So-min, but she changed her name to Jaein (which means "talented person" in Korean). At 16, she moved to Seoul and spent time busking on the streets of Hongdae. After entering Howon University (music major), Jaein performed regularly in several live clubs in Hongdae., In 2020 her first studio albumThe Quest of Anxiety was released.

=== Career Beginnings: Superstar K2 ===
In 2010, Jang appeared on Superstar K2, placing third. She led the online poll for four consecutive weeks before entering the Top 3 Week (in which she was eliminated) with second most online votes behind John Park.

In 2013, she was officially diagnosed with stress-related dystonia, she received medication and Pilates therapy.

Round	Song choice	Original artist	Theme	Result
Audition	"Head Over Feet" "The Place"	Alanis Morissette Jaein Jang	N/A	Advanced
Super Week	"Old Love" "2 Different Tears" "Cinderella"	Lee Moon Sae Wonder Girls; Seo In-Young	N/A	Advanced
Top 11	"With You"	Nam Jin	N/A	1st Place(Super Save)
Top 8	"When I stand under the shade of roadside tree"	Lee Moon Sae	Lee Moon Sae week	Safe
Top 6	"The Way You Make Me Feel"	Michael Jackson	Michael Jackson week	Safe
Top 4	"Invitation"	Uhm Jung Hwa	Judge's Week	Safe
Top 3	"Lemon Tree"	Fool's Garden	N/A	Eliminated

== Discography ==
=== Studio albums ===
Title	Album details	Peak chart positions	Sales
Title	Album details	KOR	Sales
The Quest Of Anxiety	Released: November 18, 2020; Label: New Era Project; Formats: CD, digital download	—	—

=== Extended plays ===
Title	Album details	Peak chart positions	Sales
Title	Album details	KOR	Sales
Day Breaker	Released: May 26, 2011; Label: Kiwi Music; Formats: CD, digital download	—	—
Summer Night (여름밤)	Released: August 1, 2012; Label: Stone Music Entertainment; Formats: CD, digital download	26	—
Liquid	Released: June 11, 2015; Label: Mystic Entertainment; Formats: CD, digital download	15	KOR: 19,627+
INNER SPACE	Released: December 18, 2019; Label: New Era Project; Formats: CD, digital download	–	—

=== Singles ===
Title	Year	Peak chart positions	Sales	Album
Title	Year	KOR	Sales	Album
As lead artist
"That Place" (그 곳)	2011	27	KOR: 295,660+	Early Days single album
"You Are So Childish" (그대는 철이 없네) feat. Kim Ji-Soo	2011	30	KOR: 246,763+	Day Breaker
"Winter Night" (겨울밤)	2011	9	KOR: 782,655+	Non-album singles
"No One Else But You" (다른 누구도 아닌 너에게)	2012	21	KOR: 616,854+	Non-album singles
"0 (zero)"	2013	—	—	Non-album singles
"Love Me Do"	2015	—	—	Non-album singles
"My Satellite" (나의 위성)	2015	85	KOR: 19,627+	Liquid
"Carmin" (까르망)	2017	—	—	Non-album singles
"Velvet"	2017	—	—	Non-album singles
"Button"	2018	—	—	Non-album singles
"Seoul Noir" (서울 느와르)	2018	—	—	Non-album singles
"Tell me It's Okay" (괜찮다고 말해줘)	2019	—	—	Non-album singles
"Cactus" (선인장)	2019	—	—	Non-album singles
Collaborations
"Gimbap" (김밥) with Kim Ji-soo	2013	—		Non-album single
"Christmas Wishes" (크리스마스 소원) with Park Ji-yoon, Lim Kim, Puer Kim	2013	—		Mystic Holiday 2013
"Memory" with Yoon Jong-shin	2015	—		Monthly Project Yoon Jong-shin 2015: March
"Dumb Dumb" with Giant Pink, PERC%NT	2017	—		Non-album single
"Amateur" (아마추어) with Yoon Jong-shin	2017	—		Monthly Project Yoon Jong-shin 2017: September
"Do You Have A Moment" (실례해도 될까요) with Suho	2018	—		Non-album singles
"Dinner" with Suho	2018	—		Non-album singles
"Sangsu Station Exit 2" (상수역 2번 출구) with 015B	2018	—		Non-album singles
"Camellia" (동백꽃) with 015B	2019	—		Non-album singles
Soundtrack appearances
"Please"	2010	—		Athena: Goddess of War OST
"Fantasy" (환상)	2012	—		Arang and the Magistrate OST Part 1
"The Day For You" (그대 위한 날에)	2013	—		Incarnation of Money OST Part 1
"Hallucination" (환청) feat. NaShow	2015	12		Kill Me, Heal Me OST Part 1
"Secret Paradise" (비밀낙원)	2015	—		The Scholar Who Walks the Night OST Part 1
"Don't You Know" (모르나요)	2016	—		Remember OST Part 4
"When I Dream"	2016	—		The Good Wife OST Part 3
"Fine"	2016	—		Shopping King Louie OST Part 8
"Far Away" (멀리서) with Hanhae	2017	—		Queen of Mystery OST Part 1
"Must Have"	2017	—		Strongest Deliveryman OST Part 1
"Again"	2018	—		Return OST Part 2
"Shame On You"	2019	—		VIP OST Part 4
"—" denotes releases that did not chart.

== Awards ==
=== Mnet Asian Music Awards ===
Year	Nominee / work	Award	Result
2011	"장난감 병정들"	Best New Female Artists	Nominated

=== Seoul Music Awards ===
Year	Nominee / work	Award	Result
2016	Jang Jae-in - Kill Me, Heal Me OST	OST Award	Won
