= Wish You Hell (song) =

Single by Wendy

from the EP Wish You Hell
- Language: Korean
- Released: March 12, 2024
- Genre: Pop
- Length: 2:50
- Label: SM; Kakao
- Composers: Nate Campany; Chloe Angelides; Jesse St John; Andre Davidson; Sean Davidson
- Lyricist: Kenzie
- Producer: The Monarch

Wendy singles chronology
"Like Water" (2021)	"Wish You Hell" (2024)	"Sunkiss" (2025)

Music video
- "Wish You Hell" on YouTube

"Wish You Hell" is a song recorded by South Korean singer Wendy for her second extended play of the same name. It was released as EP's lead single by SM Entertainment on March 12, 2024.

== Background and release ==
On February 19, 2024, SM Entertainment announced that Wendy would be releasing her second extended play titled Wish You Hell. On February 28, the promotional schedule was released. On March 8, a teaser video showing behind the scenes was released. On March 11, the music video teaser was released. The song was released alongside its music video and the extended play on March 12.

== Composition ==
"Wish You Hell" was written by Kenzie, composed by Nate Campany, Chloe Angelides, Jesse St John, Andre Davidson, and Sean Davidson, and arranged by The Monarch. Described as a pop song characterized by "addictive band rhythm, catchy hook melody, and rhythmic guitar melody" with lyrics about "the process of saying goodbye to the past self, who lived according to what people wanted and finding my true self". "Wish You Hell" was composed in the key of A-flat minor, with a tempo of 100 beats per minute.

== Commercial performance ==
"Wish You Hell" debuted at number 106 on South Korea's Circle Digital Chart in the chart issue dated November 5–11, 2023; on its component charts, the song debuted at number eight on the Circle Download Chart, and number 49 on the Circle BGM Chart.

== Promotion ==
Prior to the release of Wish You Hell, on March 12, 2024, Wendy held a live event called "Wendy 'Wish You Hell' Countdown Live" on YouTube, TikTok, and Weverse, aimed at introducing the extended play and its songs, including "Wish You Hell", and connecting with her fanbase. She subsequently performed on four music programs in the first week of promotion: Mnet's M Countdown on March 14, KBS's Music Bank on March 15, MBC's Show! Music Core on March 16, and SBS's Inkigayo on March 17. On the second and final week of promotion, she performed on three music programs: M Countdown on March 21, Music Bank on March 22, and Inkigayo on March 23.

== Credits and personnel ==
Credits adapted from EP's liner notes.

Studio

- SM Big Shot Studio – recording, digital editing
- SM Aube Studio – recording
- SM Dorii Studio – recording
- SM Blue Ocean Studio – mixing
- 821 Sound – mastering

Personnel

- SM Entertainment – executive producer
- Wendy – vocals, background vocals
- Kenzie – lyrics
- Nate Campany – composition
- Chloe Angelides – composition
- Jesse St John – composition
- Andre Davidson (The Monarch) – producer, composition, arrangement
- Sean Davidson (The Monarch) – producer, composition, arrangement
- G-High – vocal directing, Pro Tools operating
- Lee Min-kyu – recording, digital editing
- Kim Hyo-joon – recording
- Jeong Jae-won – recording
- Kim Cheol-sun – mixing
- Kwon Nam-woo – mastering

== Charts ==
Chart performance for "Wish You Hell"
Chart (2024)	Peak position
South Korea (Circle)	106

== Release history ==
Release history for "Wish You Hell"
Region	Date	Format	Label
Various	March 12, 2024	Digital download; streaming	SM; Kakao
