= Why Can't You Love Me? =

2021 song by Wendy

Song by Wendy

from the album Like Water
- Language: Korean
- Released: April 5, 2021
- Studio: SM Studios, Seoul, South Korea
- Genre: R&B
- Length: 2:48
- Label: SM; Dreamus
- Composers: Jamie Jones; Matt Wong; Paulina Cerrilla; Lamont Neuble; Tim Stewart
- Lyricist: Koo Tae-woo

Audio video
- "Why Can't You Love Me?" on YouTube

"Why Can't You Love Me?" is a song recorded by South Korean singer Wendy. The song was released on April 5, 2021, by SM Entertainment for her first extended play, Like Water. Composed by Jamie Jones, Matt Wong, Paulina Cerrilla, Lamont Neuble, and Tim Stewart, and written by Koo Tae-woo, it is a medium R&B pop song that expresses the excitement of unrequited love. It debuted at 200 on South Korea's Gaon Digital Chart.

== Composition ==
"Why Can't You Love Me?" was composed by Jamie Jones, Matt Wong, Paulina Cerrilla, Lamont Neuble, and Tim Stewart and was written by Koo Tae-woo. Wendy revealed that the song is "quite difficult and requires a lot of singing skills". Musically, the track was described as a medium R&B pop song. Ruby C of NME described the track as an '80s soul-influenced' song with hints from upbeat version of Annie Lennox's "A Whiter Shade Of Pale". Wendy described the track for being the "brightest" on the album. It is composed in the key of F minor with a tempo of 81 beats per minute. Lyrically, the song expresses the excitement of unrequited love.

== Reception ==
Following its initial release, "Why Can't You Love Me?" was met with positive reviews from music critics. JT Early of Beats Per Minute described the song as "unabashedly romantic", further praising its "incredibly cute and the type of wholesome pop that always feels absent from the music landscape". Erin Han of Idology called the track as it is "filled with excitement and loveliness in harmony with rhythmical band performances and vocals". Ruby C of NME described the song as "bright, cheerful sounding" track further noting the song for Wendy's "uniquely enunciated words and melismatic riffs, even rounding it off with a vocal run that slightly mirrors the late Whitney Houston's hit "I Will Always Love You".

"Why Can't You Love Me?" debuted at number 200 on the 15th weekly issue of South Korea's Gaon Digital Chart for 2021 during the period dated April 4–10. In addition, it also debuted at number 33 on Gaon Download Chart.

== Credits and personnel ==
Credits adapted from the liner notes of Like Water.

Studio

- Recorded at SM Blue Cup Studio
- Engineered for mix at SM Lvyin Studio
- Mixed at SM Concert Hall Studio
- Mastered at 821 Sound Mastering

Personnel

- Wendy – vocals, background vocals
- Koo Tae-woo – songwriting
- Jamie Jones – original writer, composition, arrangement
- Matt Wong – original writer, composition, arrangement
- Paulina Cerrilla – original writer, composition, arrangement
- Lamont Neuble – original writer, composition, arrangement
- Tim Stewart – original writer, composition, arrangement
- ButterFly – vocal director, Pro Tools operator
- Jung Eui-seok – recording
- Lee Ji-hong – mixing engineer
- Namgoong Jin – mixing
- Kwon Nam-woo – mastering

== Charts ==
Chart performance for "Why Can't You Love Me?"
Chart (2021)	Peak position
South Korea (Gaon)	200
