= Ryu Hye-rin =

South Korean actress (born 1984)

- Born: Ryu Hye-rin; 24 October 1984 (age 42); Ulsan, South Korea
- Other name: Ryoo Hye-rin
- Education: Kyungsung University (Department of Theater and Film)
- Occupation: Actress
- Years active: 2009–present
- Agent: Neos Entertainment
- Known for: How Are U Bread; Two Cops; The Game: Towards Zero
- Spouse: Kim I-an (m. 2026)

Korean name
- Hangul: 류혜린
- RR: Ryu Hyerin
- MR: Ryu Hyerin

Ryu Hye-rin (Korean: 류혜린; born 24 October 1984) is a South Korean actress. She is known for her roles in dramas How Are U Bread, Two Cops and The Game: Towards Zero. She also appeared in movies such as Sunny, Big Match and Familyhood.

== Filmography ==
=== Television series ===
| Year | Title | Role | Ref. |
|---|---|---|---|
| 2012 | The Birth of a Family | Baek Ji-won | |
| 2013 | Monstar | Seol-chan's fan | |
| 2013 | Drama Festival: "Swine Escape" | Boo-yong's maid | |
| 2014 | Steal Heart | Hwa-sook | |
| 2014 | Modern Farmer | High School girl | |
| 2014 | Righteous Love | Jung Soo-yeong | |
| 2016 | W | Sun-mi | |
| 2017 | Good Manager | Bing Hee-jin | |
| 2017 | Two Cops | Miss Bong | |
| 2018 | Radio Romance | Tornado | |
| 2018 | You Drive Me Crazy | Kang Ji-in | |
| 2018 | Welcome to Waikiki | Jin-joo | |
| 2018 | Coffee, Do Me a Favor | Park Ah-reum | |
| 2019 | Possessed | Hye-rin | |
| 2019 | When the Devil Calls Your Name | Jung Hye-won | |
| 2020 | How Are U Bread | Writer Lee | |
| 2020 | The Game: Towards Zero | Lee Yoon-hwa | |
| 2020 | Zombie Detective | Shaman | |
| 2021 | Hospital Playlist 2 | Seung-won's mother | |
| 2022 | Tomorrow | Scammer | |
| 2022 | Fly High Butterfly | Go Seong-ah | |
| 2024 | Connection | Kang Si-jung | |

=== Film ===
| Year | Title | Role |
|---|---|---|
| 2010 | Touch The Wind | Min-jeong |
| 2011 | Sunny | Member of band Girl's Generation |
| 2013 | Bean Sprouts | Myeong-ja |
| 2014 | Big Match | Twitter girl |
| 2015 | Illusionary Paradise | Cho-hee |
| 2016 | Familyhood | Joo-yun's entertainment company's trainee |
| 2017 | The Heartbeat Operator | Na-jung |
| 2018 | Golden Slumber | Oyster woman |
| 2019 | My Bossy Girl | Eun-jung |
| 2020 | Okay! Madam | Ground employee |
| 2021 | Waiting for Rain | Teacher assistant |
| 2023 | Single in Seoul | Park Joon-hee |
| 2024 | Dog Days | Nurse |

== Theater ==
| Year | English title | Korean title | Role | Ref. |
|---|---|---|---|---|
| 2022 | The General Store | 복길잡화점 | Sori | |

== Awards and nominations ==
Name of the award ceremony, year presented, category, nominee of the award, and the result of the nomination
| Award ceremony | Year | Category | Result | Ref. |
|---|---|---|---|---|
| 3rd Theatrical Enthusiasm Awards | 2011 | Rookie of the Year Award | Won | |
| Seoul Theater Festival Awards | 2015 | Rookie of the Year Award | Won | |
