= Self-Portrait (EP) =

- Digital and Archive #2 cover

EP by Suho
- Released: March 30, 2020
- Recorded: 2020
- Studios: Doobdoob (Seoul); Kikimaster (Seoul); Prelude (Seoul); SM Blue Cup (Seoul); SM SSAM (Seoul); SM Yellow Tail (Seoul); Tone (Seoul); The Vibe (Seoul)
- Genres: Pop; rock
- Length: 23:18
- Language: Korean
- Labels: SM; Dreamus
- Producer: Lee Soo-man

Suho chronology
Self-Portrait (2020)	Grey Suit (2022)

Singles from Self-Portrait
- 1. "Let's Love" Released: March 30, 2020

Self-Portrait (Korean: 자화상; RR: Jahwasang) is the debut extended play by South Korean singer Suho. It was released on March 30, 2020, by SM Entertainment. The physical edition was released in two versions, Archive #1 and Archive #2, while the digital version shares the cover of the latter, a collage of four impressionist paintings of Suho's face. The EP features six tracks including the lead single, "Let's Love".

== Background and release ==
On February 18, 2020, SM Entertainment announced that Suho was preparing for his solo debut. On February 27 it was reported that the singer had already completed recording the album. The release date was later announced along with the first promotional photo for the album.

The album and its title track's music video were released on March 30 at 6PM KST both digitally and physically.

== Composition ==
Self-Portrait features six tracks of different pop and rock genres. The lead single "Let's Love" is described as a modern rock song with a warm atmosphere. The lyrics convey a message about mustering the courage to express love, even if you feel clumsy or inadequate.

"O2" is a dreamlike acoustic pop song. The lyrics are about two people with empty hearts who become each other's oxygen as they fall in love. The third song "Made in You" is a mid-tempo pop song that features a groovy drum beat and piano melody. The song is dedicated to Suho's fans, and the lyrics are about how he feels he wouldn't have made it this far or be who he is without them. "Starry Night" is described as a ballad rock song that serves as a continuation of the story present in Suho's first solo song, "Curtain" (2017). The lyrics express the pain of parting with a lover. "Self-Portrait" is a sentimental modern rock song with retro synthesizers and strings. The last song "For You Now" is an acoustic pop song with a piano-driven melody. It presents lyrics conveying sincere gratitude and comfort from one person to another. The song features singer Younha.

Suho participated in writing and conceptualizing each song on the EP, and every track represents a piece of the album's connecting storyline.

== Commercial performance ==
The EP peaked at number 13 on the US World Albums chart. Additionally, Self-Portrait topped over 50 countries' iTunes charts. The EP was certified Platinum for selling over 55,000 copies on China's biggest music platform, QQ Music.

== Track listing ==
Self-Portrait track listing
No.	Title	Lyrics	Music	Arrangement	Length
1.	"O2"	DJ HotBoyzZz (Cliff Lin, Ryan Colt Levy, Bryan Cho); SH2O	DJ HotBoyzZz (Cliff Lin, Ryan Colt Levy, Bryan Cho)	DJ HotBoyzZz (Cliff Lin, Ryan Colt Levy, Bryan Cho)	3:48
2.	"Let's Love" (사랑, 하자; Sarang, haja)	Noday; Aisle; Park Moon-chi; SH2O	Aisle; Park Moon-chi; Noday	Park Moon-chi	3:49
3.	"Made in You"	minGtion; JUNNY; SH2O	Geun-tae; minGtion; JUNNY	minGtion	3:30
4.	"Starry Night" (암막 커튼; Ammak keoteun; 'Blackout curtains')	Jo Yoon-kyung; SH2O	Kyo	Kyo; Lim Heon-il	4:38
5.	"Self-Portrait" (자화상; Jahwasang)	B-Rock (CLEF); J-Lin (CLEF); ALBN (CLEF); CLEF CREW; SH2O	B-Rock (CLEF); J-Lin (CLEF); ALBN (CLEF); CLEF CREW	B-Rock (CLEF); J-Lin (CLEF); ALBN (CLEF)	3:50
6.	"For You Now" (너의 차례; Neoui charye; 'Your turn') (featuring Younha))	Bang Hye-hyun (Jam Factory); JUNNY; SH2O	Krysta Youngs; David Nathan; Alessia Iorio	David Nathan	3:43
Total length:					23:18

== Charts ==
=== Weekly charts ===
Weekly chart performance for Self-Portrait
Chart (2020)	Peak position
Japanese Albums (Oricon)	26
Japan Hot Albums (Billboard Japan)	22
Polish Albums (ZPAV)	32
South Korean Albums (Gaon)	1
UK Album Downloads (Official Charts)	70
US World Albums (Billboard)	13

=== Monthly charts ===
Monthly chart performance for Self-Portrait
Chart (2020)	Peak position
South Korean Albums (Gaon)	3

== Sales ==
Sales figures for Self-Portrait
Region	Sales
China	100,034
Japan	1,394
South Korea	289,738
United States	1,000

== Certifications ==
Certifications for Self-Portrait
Region	Certification	Certified units/sales
South Korea (KMCA)	Platinum	250,000^{^}
^{^} Shipments figures based on certification alone.

== Release history ==
Release formats for Self-Portrait
Region	Date	Format	Label
South Korea	March 30, 2020	CD	SM; Dreamus
Various	March 30, 2020	Digital download; streaming	SM

== See also ==
- List of Gaon Album Chart number ones of 2020
