= Suho =

South Korean singer (born 1991)

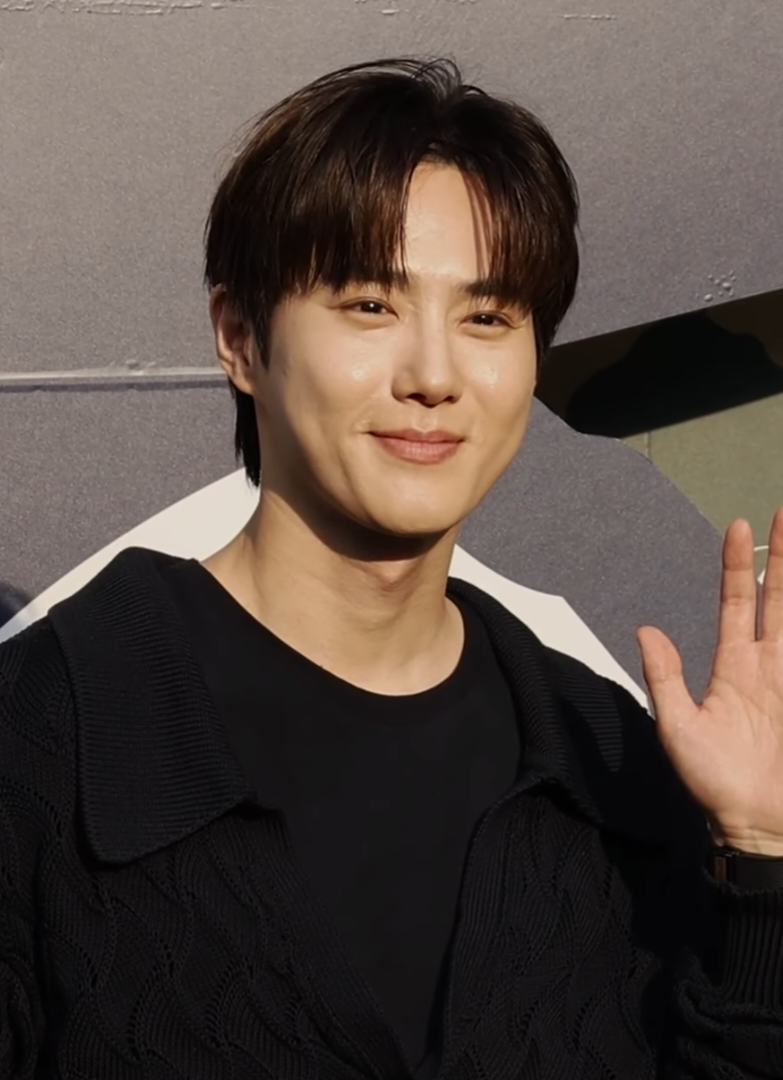
- Suho in May 2026
- Born: Kim Jun-myeon; May 22, 1991 (age 35); Seoul, South Korea
- Other name: SH2O
- Education: Kyung Hee Cyber University; Inha University
- Occupations: Singer; songwriter; actor
- Years active: 2012–present
- Musical career
- Genres: K-pop; K-rock
- Label: SM
- Member of: Exo; Exo-K; SM Town
- Website: www.smtown.com/artist/musician/102

Korean name
- Hangul: 김준면
- Hanja: 金俊勉
- RR: Gim Junmyeon
- MR: Kim Chunmyŏn

Stage name
- Hangul: 수호
- Hanja: 守護
- RR: Suho
- MR: Suho

Signature
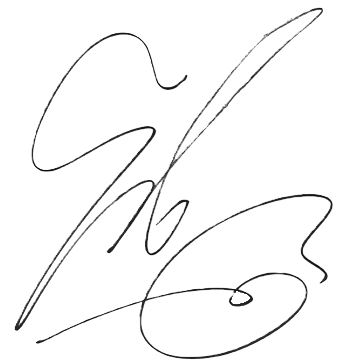

Kim Jun-myeon (Korean: 김준면; born May 22, 1991), known professionally as Suho (수호; lit. 'guardian'), is a South Korean singer, songwriter, and actor. He is the leader of the South Korean-Chinese boy group Exo and its sub-unit Exo-K. He debuted as a soloist on March 30, 2020, with the release of his extended play (EP) Self-Portrait. Outside of his musical career, Suho has also starred in various television dramas and movies such as One Way Trip (2016), The Universe's Star (2017), Rich Man (2018), Middle School Girl A (2018), How Are U Bread (2020), Behind Your Touch (2023), and Missing Crown Prince (2024).

== Early life ==
Suho was born Kim Jun-myeon on May 22, 1991, in Yeoui-dong, Yeongdeungpo District, Seoul, South Korea. He lives in Apgujeong-dong with his family. During his youth, Suho was the class president in elementary school and the vice-chairman of his school's student body. He graduated from the prestigious Whimoon Middle School and Gaepo High School, where he excelled academically.

Suho became a trainee through SM Entertainment's Casting System in 2006 when he was 15 years old, after being discovered on the streets by an SM casting manager. In 2007, he was cast with a cameo role in the Super Junior film Attack on the Pin-Up Boys.

== Career ==
=== 2012–2019: Debut and acting career beginnings ===
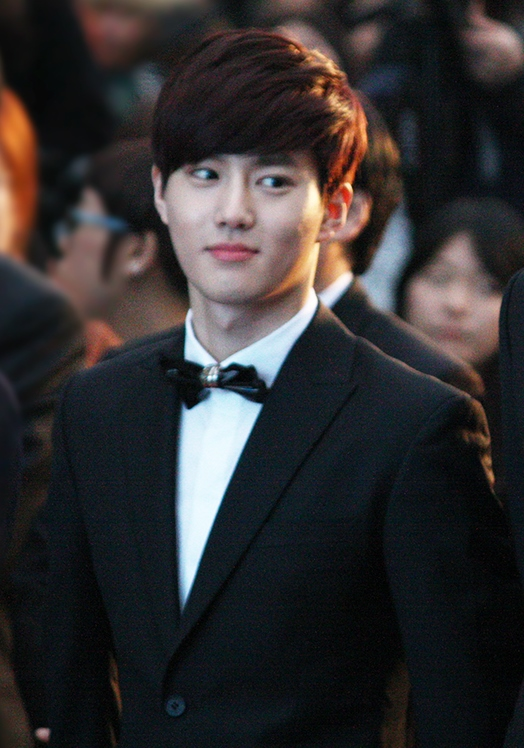
Suho in March 2014

Suho was introduced as the tenth member of Exo on February 15, 2012. The group debuted in April 2012 with the extended play Mama with him as their leader. In 2013, Suho voiced the main character Bernard for the Korean dub of the animated movie, Saving Santa. He also recorded the movie's original soundtrack of the same name with Apink's Jung Eun-ji. In February 2014, Suho became a regular host for SBS' weekly music show Inkigayo alongside fellow Exo member Baekhyun, ZE:A member Kwanghee and actress Lee Yu-bi. Suho and Baekhyun left their positions in November 2014 in order to focus on the release of Exo's second studio album.

In January 2015, he starred in SM Entertainment's hologram musical, School OZ, playing the character of Hans alongside labelmates Changmin, Key, Luna, Xiumin and Seulgi. In April 2015, he was a regular cast member in the KBS variety show Fluttering India, where they explored few places in Mumbai, India.

In March 2016, Suho made his big screen debut the indie film One Way Trip, which premiered at the 20th Busan International Film Festival. In April 2016, he was confirmed to be starring in the upcoming web drama How Are U Bread. The series is scheduled to be released in Korea and China. In July 2016, Suho and fellow Exo member Chen released a duet titled "Beautiful Accident" as an original soundtrack for the Chinese movie of the same name. Suho starred as the male lead in the MBC drama special The Universe's Star, part of the drama trilogy Three Color Fantasy in January 2017 and recorded an original soundtrack titled "Starlight" for the drama. In February 2017, he collaborated with jazz pianist Song Young-joo on "Curtain", the last single from the Station project's first season. In September 2017, it was confirmed that Suho will be the male lead of the film Female Middle Schooler A. From December 2017 to March 2018, starred as Crown Prince Rudolf in musical The Last Kiss.

In March 2018, Suho collaborated with Jang Jae-in and released two duets titled "Dinner" and "Do you have a moment". In May 2018, Suho returned to the small screen with the South Korean adaption of the 2012 Japanese drama Rich Man, Poor Woman, playing the role of an IT company founder (portrayed by Shun Oguri in the original). Suho also starred in Student A, a film adaptation of a webtoon, released in June 2018. From July to August 2018, Suho starred in the musical The Man Who Laughs in the role of Gwynplaine, a pure character with a monster-like face. He received standing ovation and positive feedback for his role from the audience on the musical's first day. On October 28, 2019, a VR Film titled "The Present" is released in which Suho played the role of a young entrepreneur Ha-Neul, along with actors like Shin Ha-Kyun and Kim Seul-gi.

=== 2020–present: Solo debut, military service, and further releases ===
On March 30, 2020, Suho released his debut EP, Self-Portrait and its lead single "Let's Love", becoming the fourth Exo member to have debuted as a solo artist. The EP debuted at number one on the Gaon Album Chart and has sold over 290,338 copies in South Korea. He won all three main music shows in Korean broadcast during the week and became the first Exo member to do so.

On May 14, Suho enlisted for his mandatory military service as a public service officer. He was discharged on February 13, 2022.

On March 10, 2022, it was confirmed that Suho would release his second mini album Grey Suit and its lead single of the same name on April 4, 2022, which was his first comeback following his discharge from the military.

In October 23, Thai actor-singer Mew Suppasit released his single, "Turn Off The Alarm", a collaboration with Suho. On October 27, Suho released "Call me a Freak", a single from the original soundtrack for Korean television series Bad Prosecutor, which stars fellow Exo member D.O.

In March 2023, it was revealed that Suho had been cast as the title role in the South Korean musical production Mozart!, which is set to run from June to August at the Sejong Center in Seoul.

In August 2023, Suho made his small screen comeback in JTBC's Behind Your Touch as one of the lead actors. He then made a cameo appearance in the last episode of the second season of tvN's Arthdal Chronicles on October 23, 2023.

In January 2024, Suho was confirmed to star in MBN's Missing Crown Prince which was released on April 13, 2024. He also recorded the song "Love You More Gradually" (Korean: 아스라이, 더 가까이) for the soundtrack of the series.

In May 2024, Suho announced his third EP titled 1 to 3 along with its double lead singles—one of the same title and "Cheese" featuring labelmate Wendy, which were released on May 31.

== Personal life ==
In 2009, Suho began attending Korea National University of Arts, however, he withdrew from it in 2011 and continued his education at Kyung Hee Cyber University along with fellow Exo members Chanyeol and Baekhyun. There he took classes for the Culture and Arts Department of Business Administration. In 2016, Suho started attending Inha University Graduate School for a master's degree in Culture Management.

Aside from speaking native language Korean, Suho has been practicing English following his discharge from mandatory military service. On May 20, 2022, he delivered a speech as a panel member discussing Hallyu wave in English at Stanford University's Walter H. Shorenstein Asia–Pacific Research Center conference.

== Philanthropy ==
Since 2019, Suho has regularly donated his personal items every year for auctions conducted by the Shiny Foundation, a donation organisation founded by the family of SHINee's Jonghyun.

Suho is named in the list of donors who have donated more than ₩50 million (equivalent to ₩52.25 million or US$38,982.32 in 2025) at the Seoul National University Hospital.

In April 2024, Suho alongside several South Korean entertainers joined Green Heart Bazaar, a fundraiser organized by UNICEF Korea to aid Palestinian children in Gaza Strip affected by the Gaza war.

== Discography ==
=== Extended plays ===
List of extended plays, with selected chart positions, sale figures and certifications
Title	Details	Peak chart positions			Sales	Certifications
Title	Details	KOR	JPN	US World	Sales	Certifications
Self-Portrait	Released: March 30, 2020; Label: SM Entertainment; Formats: CD, digital download, streaming	1	26	13	KOR: 290,338; CHN: 128,146; JPN: 2,227 (Phy.); US: 1,000	KMCA: Platinum
Grey Suit	Released: April 4, 2022; Label: SM Entertainment; Formats: CD, digital download, streaming	2	12	—	KOR: 211,107; JPN: 5,052 (Phy.)	
1 to 3	Released: May 31, 2024; Label: SM Entertainment; Formats: CD, LP, digital download, streaming	3	27	—	KOR: 154,674; JPN: 1,537 (Phy.)	
Who Are You	Released: September 22, 2025; Label: SM Entertainment; Formats: CD, LP, digital download, streaming; Track listing: 1. "Who Are You"; 2. "Light the Fire"; 3. "Medicine"; 4. "Birthday"; 5. "Golden Hour"; 6. "Fadeout"; 7. "Who Are You (English Version)"	8	—	—	KOR: 78,577	

=== Singles ===
==== As lead artist ====
List of singles, showing year released, selected chart positions, and name of the album
Title	Year	Peak chart positions	Album
Title	Year	KOR	Album
"Let's Love" (사랑, 하자)	2020	7	Self-Portrait
"Grey Suit"	2022	— (Note: "Grey Suit" did not enter the Gaon Digital Chart, but peaked at number 7 on the Gaon Download Chart.)	Grey Suit
"Hurdle"	2022	— (Note: "Hurdle" did not enter the Gaon Digital Chart, but peaked at number 39 on the Gaon Download Chart.)	Grey Suit
"Cheese" (치즈) (featuring Wendy)	2024	— (Note: "Cheese" did not enter the Circle Digital Chart, but peaked at number 78 on the Circle Download Chart.)	1 to 3
"1 to 3" (전선면)	2024	— (Note: "1 to 3" did not enter the Circle Digital Chart, but peaked at number 53 on the Circle Download Chart.)	1 to 3
"Who Are You"	2025	— (Note: "Who Are You" did not enter the Circle Digital Chart, but peaked at number 27 on the Circle Download Chart.)	Who Are You
"—" denotes releases that did not chart or were not released in that territory.

==== Collaborations ====
List of collaborations, showing year released, selected chart positions, sales, and name of the album
Title	Year	Peak chart positions		Sales (DL)	Album
Title	Year	KOR	US World	Sales (DL)	Album
"My Hero" (나의 영웅) (with Leeteuk, Kassy & Jo Young-soo)	2016	177	—	—N/a	SM Station Season 1
"Curtain" (커튼) (with Song Young-joo)	2017	74	16	KOR: 70,125	SM Station Season 1
"Do You Have a Moment" (실례해도 될까요) (with Jang Jae-in)	2018	91	—	—N/a	Non-album singles
"Dinner" (with Jang Jae-in)	2018	—	11	—N/a	Non-album singles
"Turn Off the Alarm" (with Suppasit Jongcheveevat)	2022	—	—	—N/a	Global Collaboration Project 2022
"—" denotes releases that did not chart or were not released in that territory.

==== Soundtrack appearances ====
List of soundtracks, showing year released, selected chart positions, and name of the album
Title	Year	Peak chart positions	Album
Title	Year	KOR Down.	Album
"Saving Santa" (with Jung Eun-ji)	2013	—	Saving Santa OST
"Starlight" (낮에 뜨는 별) (featuring Remi)	2017	—	The Universe's Star OST
"Beautiful Accident" (with Chen)	2017	—	Beautiful Accident OST
"Sedansogu" (세단소그)	2020	52	How Are U Bread OST
"Call Me a Freak"	2022	111	Bad Prosecutor OST Part.4
"Forever"	2023	161	Gyeongseong Creature OST Part.1
"Love You More Gradually" (아스라이, 더 가까이)	2024	195	Missing Crown Prince OST Part.1
"—" denotes releases that did not chart or were not released in that territory.

=== Other charted songs ===
List of other charted songs, showing year released, selected chart positions, and name of the album
Title	Year	Peak chart positions	Sales (DL)	Album
Title	Year	KOR	Sales (DL)	Album
"Beautiful"	2014	75	KOR: 18,675	Exology Chapter 1: The Lost Planet
"Playboy"	2019	—	—N/a	Exo Planet #4 - The Elyxion [dot]
"O2"	2020	91	—N/a	Self-Portrait
"Made in You"	2020	75	—N/a	Self-Portrait
"Starry Night" (암막 커튼)	2020	100	—N/a	Self-Portrait
"Self-Portrait" (자화상)	2020	88	—N/a	Self-Portrait
"For You Now" (너의 차례) (featuring Younha)	2020	87	—N/a	Self-Portrait
"Morning Star"	2022	— (Note: "Morning Star" did not enter the Gaon Digital Chart, but debuted at number 44 on the Gaon Download Chart.)	—N/a	Grey Suit
"Decanting"	2022	— (Note: "Decanting" did not enter the Gaon Digital Chart, but debuted at number 51 on the Gaon Download Chart.)	—N/a	Grey Suit
"Bear Hug" (이리 溫)	2022	— (Note: "Bear Hug" did not enter the Gaon Digital Chart, but debuted at number 48 on the Gaon Download Chart.)	—N/a	Grey Suit
"Moment" (75분의 1초)	2022	— (Note: "Moment" did not enter the Gaon Digital Chart, but debuted at number 47 on the Gaon Download Chart.)	—N/a	Grey Suit
"Mayday"	2024	— (Note: "Mayday" did not enter the Circle Digital Chart, but peaked at number 121 on the Circle Download Chart.)	—N/a	1 to 3
"Wishful Thinking"	2024	— (Note: "Wishful Thinking" did not enter the Circle Digital Chart, but peaked at number 122 on the Circle Download Chart.)	—N/a	1 to 3
"Moonlight"	2024	— (Note: "Moonlight" did not enter the Circle Digital Chart, but peaked at number 116 on the Circle Download Chart.)	—N/a	1 to 3
"Alright Alright"	2024	— (Note: "Alright Alright" did not enter the Circle Digital Chart, but peaked at number 117 on the Circle Download Chart.)	—N/a	1 to 3
"Zero Gravity" (무중력	2024	— (Note: "Zero Gravity" did not enter the Circle Digital Chart, but peaked at number 118 on the Circle Download Chart.)	—N/a	1 to 3
"—" denotes releases that did not chart or were not released in that territory.

=== Songwriting ===
All credits are adapted from the Korea Music Copyright Association, unless stated otherwise.

Year	Artist(s)	Song	Album	Lyrics (Note: Suho was credited as SH2O for the lyrics writing.)	
Year	Artist(s)	Song	Album	Credited	With
2018	Suho with Jang Jae-in	"Do You Have A Moment"	Non-album single	Yes	Jang Jae-in, Kouame Jean Baptiste, Gerongco Robert Tigley, Gerongco Samuel Tigley, Aless Ria Iorio
2018	Suho with Jang Jae-in	"Dinner"	Non-album single	Yes	Jang Jae-in
2020	Suho	"O2"	Self-Portrait	Yes	DJ HotBoyzZz (Cliff Lin, Ryan Colt Levy, Bryan Cho)
2020	Suho	"Let's Love"	Self-Portrait	Yes	Noday, Aisle, Park Moon-chi
2020	Suho	"Made In You"	Self-Portrait	Yes	minGtion, JUNNY
2020	Suho	"Starry Night"	Self-Portrait	Yes	Jo Yoon-kyung
2020	Suho	"Self-Portrait"	Self-Portrait	Yes	B-Rock (CLEF), J-Lin (CLEF), ALBN (CLEF), CLEF CREW
2020	Suho featuring Younha	"For You Now"	Self-Portrait	Yes	Bang Hye-hyun (Jam Factory), JUNNY
2022	Suho	"Morning Star"	Grey Suit	Yes	Noday, Gila, Park Moonchi
2022	Suho	"Grey Suit"	Grey Suit	Yes	Jo Yoon-kyung
2022	Suho	"Hurdle"	Grey Suit	Yes	Gila, Noday, Aisle, Park Moon-chi
2022	Suho	"Decanting"	Grey Suit	Yes	BYMORE, John OFA Rhee, Oiaisle
2022	Suho	"Bear Hug"	Grey Suit	Yes	BYMORE, Rhee, Aisle
2022	Suho	"Moment"	Grey Suit	Yes	Moon Seol-ri
2024	Suho	"Mayday"	1 to 3	Yes	Lee Seu-ran
2024	Suho	"1 to 3"	1 to 3	Yes	Danke, Hukky Shibaseki, Lee Jae, Oiaisle
2024	Suho	"Wishful Thinking"	1 to 3	Yes	Ceramic Office
2024	Suho	"Moonlight"	1 to 3	Yes	Kelbyul
2024	Suho	"Zero Gravity"	1 to 3	Yes	Lee Hyung-suk
2024	Suho featuring Wendy	"Cheese"	1 to 3	Yes	Noday, Gila, Oiaisle, Park Moon-chi
2024	Suho featuring Giriboy	"Alright Alright"	1 to 3	Yes	Song Chae-ri, Giriboy

== Filmography ==
=== Film ===
Year	Title	Role	Notes	Ref.
2007	Attack on the Pin-Up Boys	Dancer	Extra	
2013	Saving Santa	Bernard (voice)	Korean dub	
2016	One Way Trip	Sang-woo		
2018	Student A	Hyun Jae-hee		
2019	The Present	Ha Neul	VR film	

=== Television series ===
Year	Title	Role	Notes	Ref.
2012	To the Beautiful You	Himself	Cameo (episode 2)	
2014	Prime Minister & I	Han Tae-woong	Cameo (episodes 10–12)	
2017	The Universe's Star	Han Woo-joo		
2018	Rich Man	Lee Yoo-chan		
2023	Behind Your Touch	Kim Seon-woo		
2023	Arthdal Chronicles	Arok	Cameo; season 2	
2024	Missing Crown Prince	Yi Geon		

=== Web series ===
Year	Title	Role	Notes	Ref.
2015	Exo Next Door	Himself		
2020	How Are U Bread	Han Do-woo		

=== Television show ===
Year	Title	Role	Notes	Ref.
2014	Inkigayo	Co-host		
2015	Fluttering India	Main cast		
2016	Duet Song Festival	Competitor		
2017	Korea from Above	Narration	with Xiumin; Documentaries	
2022	Besties in Wonderland	Cast Member		

=== Music videos ===
Year	Song Title	Ref.
2013	"Saving Santa" (with Eunji)	
2016	"My Hero" (with Leeteuk, Jo Young-soo & Kassy)	
2017	"Curtain" (with Song Young-joo)	
2017	"Beautiful Accident" (with Chen)	
2017	"Starlight (The Universe's Star OST MV)" (with Remi)	
2018	"Do You Have A Moment" (with Jang Jae-in)	
2018	"Dinner" (with Jang Jae-in)	
2019	"This is Your Day (for every child, UNICEF)" (as part of UNICEF)	
2020	"Sedansogu (How Are U Bread OST)"	
2020	"Let's Love"	
2022	"Grey Suit"	
2022	"Hurdle"	
Guest appearances
2014	"To Mother" (remake; G.O.D.)	
2015	"Paradise" (소녀시대) by Girls' Generation	
2016	"Crosswalk" (황단보도) by Jo Kwon	

== Theater ==
Year	Title	Role	Notes	Ref.
2015	School OZ	Hans	Holographic musical; main role	
2017	The Last Kiss	Crown Prince Rudolf	Lead role	
2018, 2020	The Man Who Laughs	Gwynplaine	Lead role	
2023	Mozart!	Wolfgang Amadeus Mozart	Lead role	

== Tours ==
=== Suho World Concert Tour "Su:Home" (2024) ===
On March 24, 2024, SM Entertainment announced that Suho will be holding a two-day concerts "Su:Home" at Olympic Hall on May 25–26, 2024 in Seoul, South Korea. On April 4, the dates of the Asia leg of "Su:Home" were released. On September 4, his promoter concert announced that the Europe legs in five cities and Dubai was canceled. On November 28, the encore concert was announced to held at Seoul's Olympic Handball Gymnasium on January 25–26, 2025.

Tour dates
Date	City	Country	Venue
Leg 1 – Asia
May 25, 2024	Seoul	South Korea	Olympic Hall
May 26, 2024	Seoul	South Korea	Olympic Hall
June 22, 2024	Manila	Philippines	Araneta Coliseum
July 6, 2024	Hong Kong	China	AsiaWorld-Expo, Hall 10
July 13, 2024	Taipei	Taiwan	Taipei Music Center
July 20, 2024	Bangkok	Thailand	Royal Paragon Hall
July 28, 2024	Kuala Lumpur	Malaysia	Mega Star Arena
August 10, 2024	Jakarta	Indonesia	Tennis Indoor Senayan
Leg 2 – Europe
September 10, 2024	London	England	Indigo At The O2
September 12, 2024	Paris	France	L'Olympia
September 14, 2024	Düsseldorf	Germany	Mitsubishi Electric Halle
September 16, 2024	Berlin	Germany	Columbiahalle
September 18, 2024	Warsaw	Poland	Stodola Club
Leg 3 – Asia
September 20, 2024	Dubai	UAE	The Agenda
September 27, 2024	Tokyo	Japan	Tachikawa Stage Garden
September 28, 2024	Tokyo	Japan	Tachikawa Stage Garden
October 12, 2024	Osaka	Japan	Fenice Sacay
October 13, 2024	Nagoya	Japan	Niterra Hall Forest Hall
January 25, 2025	Seoul	South Korea	Olympic Handball Gymnasium
January 26, 2025	Seoul	South Korea	Olympic Handball Gymnasium

== Ambassadorship ==
Year	Title	Ref.
2019	Bvlgari Brand Ambassador	
2019	13th Daegu International Musical Festival Ambassador	
2019	7th Suncheon Bay World Animal Film Festival Ambassador	
2019	4th International Film Festival and Awards • Macao (IFFAM) Ambassador	
2022	Seoul Welfare Foundation Public Relation Ambassador	
2022	Anua Skincare Brand Ambassador	
2022	Montes Wines Brand Ambassador	
2023	Soonchunhyang University's Ambassador for Educational Innovation	
2023	Boss Brand Ambassador	
2024	Seoul Welfare Foundation Public Relation Ambassador (Reappointment)	
2024	"Enjoy the Flow, Savour Every Moment" Campaign by Diageo's DRINKiQ	

== Awards and nominations ==
Name of the award ceremony, year presented, award category, nominee(s) of the award, and the result of the nomination
Award ceremony	Year	Category	Nominee(s)/work(s)	Result	Ref.
Asia Artist Awards	2023	Best Acting Performance Award	Suho	Won	
Asia Artist Awards	2023	Best Emotive Award – Actor	Suho	Won	
Asia Artist Awards	2023	Popularity Award – Actor	Suho	Nominated	
Asia Artist Awards	2024	Artist of the Year – Music	Suho	Won	
Asia Artist Awards	2024	Best Actor Award	Suho	Won	
Asia Culture Awards	2019	Male Rookie Actor	The Man Who Laughs	Won	
Click! StarWars TheFactNews Year-End Awards	2016	Popular K-Pop Star Award	Suho	Won	
DIMF Awards	2019	DIMF PR Ambassador	Suho	Won	
Gaon Chart Music Awards	2020	Artist of the Year – March	"Let's Love"	Nominated	
Gaon Chart Music Awards	2020	MuBeat Global Choice Award – Male	Suho	Nominated	
Genie Music Awards	2020	Artist of the Year	Suho	Nominated	
Golden Disc Awards	2020	Album Bonsang	Self-Portrait	Nominated	
International Film Festival & Awards Macao	2019	Token of Appreciation	Suho	Won	
JIMFF Awards	2019	Discovery of the Year – Male Actor	Middle School Girl A	Won	
Korea Grand Music Awards	2024	Best OST	"Forever" (from Gyeongseong Creature)	Nominated	
Korea Grand Music Awards	2025	Best Music 10	Who Are You	Won	
Korea Grand Music Awards	2025	Best Solo Artist – Male	Suho	Won	
Korea Grand Music Awards	2025	BIGC Global Star Award	Suho	Won	
Korea Grand Music Awards	2025	Trend of the Year – K-pop Solo	Suho	Nominated	
Korea Musical Awards	2019	Best Male Rookie Actor	The Man Who Laughs	Nominated	
Melon Music Awards	2018	Hot Trend Award	"Do You Have a Moment" (with Jang Jae-in)	Nominated	
Melon Music Awards	2020	Best Rock	"Let's Love"	Nominated	
Melon Music Awards	2020	Netizen Popularity Award	Suho	Nominated	
Melon Music Awards	2020	Top 10 Artists	Suho	Nominated	
Stagetalk Audience Choice Awards	2018	Best Male Rookie Musical Actor Award	The Man Who Laughs	Won	
Yegreen Musical Awards	2018	Best New Male Actor Award	The Man Who Laughs	Nominated	
Yegreen Musical Awards	2018	Popularity Award Male Actor	The Man Who Laughs	Won	
