= Wish You Hell =

- Digital cover

EP by Wendy
- Released: March 12, 2024
- Length: 18:11
- Language: Korean; English
- Label: SM; Kakao

Wendy chronology
Like Water (2021)	Wish You Hell (2024)	Cerulean Verge (2025)

Singles from Wish You Hell
- 1. "Wish You Hell" Released: March 12, 2024

Wish You Hell is the second extended play by South Korean singer Wendy. It was released by SM Entertainment on March 12, 2024, and contains six tracks including the lead single "Wish You Hell".

== Background and release ==
On February 19, 2024, SM Entertainment announced that Wendy would be releasing her second extended play titled Wish You Hell. On February 28, the promotional schedule was released. On March 7, teaser videos for "His Car Isn't Yours" and "Better Judgement" was released. A day later, teaser videos for "Wish You Hell", "Best Ever", and "Vermilion" were released. On March 11, the music video teaser for "Wish You Hell" was released. The extended play was released alongside the music video for the lead single on March 12.

== Composition ==
Wish You Hell contains six tracks. The lead single, "Wish You Hell", is a pop song characterized by an "addictive band rhythm, catchy hook melody, and rhythmic guitar melody" with lyrics about "the process of saying goodbye to the past self, who lived according to what people wanted and finding my true self". The second track, "His Car Isn't Yours", is a R&B pop ballad song with lyrics telling the story of "a narrator who belatedly realizes the importance of a relationship he had missed". The third track, "Best Ever", is a "medium-tempo" R&B pop song featuring "mellow electronic rhythm and cheerful bass rhythm" with lyrics about "returning to being a girl who was awkward in front of her first love". The fourth track, "Better Judgement", is a R&B pop ballad song characterized by "electric guitar sound that span the entire song" with lyrics about "express a determination to leave behind the clumsy youth that was with us in the past and move forward as an adult who accepts me as I am now". The fifth track, "Queen of the Party", is a pop dance song with "rhythmic drums and synth melody" with lyrics about "holding a party alone in your own space without any disturbance and becoming the queen yourself". The last track, "Vermilion", is a R&B pop ballad featuring "rich string melodies" with lyrics "describing the image of me becoming more like the other person and becoming braver as I meet and love you".

== Promotion ==
Prior to the release of Wish You Hell, on March 12, 2024, Wendy held a live event called "Wendy 'Wish You Hell' Countdown Live" on YouTube, TikTok, and Weverse, aimed at introducing the extended play and connecting with her fanbase.

== Track listing ==
Track listing for Wish You Hell
No.	Title	Lyrics	Music	Arrangement	Length
1.	"Wish You Hell"	Kenzie	Nate Campany; Chloe Angelides; Jesse St John; Andre Davidson; Sean Davidson	The Monarch	2:50
2.	"His Car Isn't Yours"	Anna Dasha Novotny	Anna Dasha Novotny; Jack Jody	Anna Dasha Novotny; Jack Jody	3:04
3.	"Best Ever"	Jo In-ho (Lalala Studio)	Jorgen Odegard; Michael Pollack; James Lavigne; Skyler Stonestreet	Jorgen Odegard	3:09
4.	"Better Judgement"	Lee Seu-ran	Peter Wallevik; Daniel Davidsen; Britt Burton; Delacey; Anna Dasha Novotny	PhD	2:50
5.	"Queen of the Party"	Moon Yeo-reum (Jam Factory)	David Mørup; Clara Toft Simonsen	David Mørup	3:07
6.	"Vermilion"	Jo Yoon-kyung	Jinbyjin; Ellen Berg; Realmeee	Jinbyjin	3:11
Total length:					18:11

== Credits and personnel ==
Credits adapted from EP's liner notes.

Studio

- SM Big Shot Studio – recording (track 1), digital editing (track 1)
- SM Aube Studio – recording (track 1–2, 5–6), digital editing (track 2, 5–6)
- SM Dorii Studio – recording (track 1)
- SM Lvyin Studio – recording (track 2), digital editing (track 2)
- SM Yellow Tail Studio – recording (track 2)
- SM Droplet Studio – recording (track 3–4), digital editing (track 3)
- Doobdoob Studio – digital editing (track 4)
- SM Blue Ocean Studio – mixing (track 1)
- SM Starlight Studio – mixing (track 2, 5)
- SM Blue Cup Studio – mixing (track 3)
- Klang Studio – mixing (track 4)
- SM Concert Hall Studio – mixing (track 6)
- 821 Sound – mastering (all tracks)

Personnel

- SM Entertainment – executive producer
- Wendy – vocals (all tracks), background vocals (all tracks)
- Kenzie – lyrics (track 1)
- Nate Campany – composition (track 1)
- Chloe Angelides – composition (track 1)
- Jesse St John – composition (track 1)
- Andre Davidson (The Monarch) – composition, arrangement (track 1)
- Sean Davidson (The Monarch) – composition, arrangement (track 1)
- Anna Dasha Novotny – lyrics (track 2), composition (track 2, 4), arrangement (track 2), background vocals (track 2)
- Jack Jody – composition, arrangement (track 2)
- Jo In-ho (Lalala Studio) – lyrics (track 3)
- Jorgen Odegard – composition, arrangement (track 3)
- Michael Pollack – composition (track 3)
- James Lavigne – composition (track 3)
- Skyler Stonestreet – composition (track 3)
- Lee Seu-ran – lyrics (track 4)
- Peter Wallevik (PhD) – composition, arrangement (track 4)
- Daniel Davidsen (PhD) – composition, arrangement (track 4)
- Britt Burton – composition (track 4)
- Delacey – composition (track 4)
- Moon Yeo-reum (Jam Factory) – lyrics (track 5)
- David Mørup – composition, arrangement (track 5)
- Clara Toft Simonsen – composition (track 5), background vocals (track 5)
- Jo Yoon-kyung – lyrics (track 6)
- Jinbyjin – composition, arrangement, Rhodes, programming (track 6)
- Ellen Berg – composition (track 6)
- Realmeee – composition (track 6)
- G-High – vocal directing, Pro Tools operating (track 1)
- Kim Jin-hwan – vocal directing (track 2)
- Sophia Pae – vocal directing (track 2)
- MinGtion – vocal directing (track 3–4)
- Lee Joo-hyung – vocal directing, Pro Tools operating (track 5–6)
- Lee Min-kyu – recording (track 1), digital editing (track 1)
- Kim Hyo-joon – recording (track 1–2, 5–6), digital editing (track 2, 5–6)
- Jeong Jae-won – recording (track 1)
- Lee Ji-hong – recording (track 2), digital editing (track 2)
- Noh Min-ji – recording (track 2)
- Kim Joo-hyun – recording (track 3–4), digital editing (track 3)
- Jang Woo-young – digital editing (track 4)
- Kim Cheol-sun – mixing (track 1)
- Jeong Yoo-ra – mixing (track 2, 5)
- Jung Eui-seok – mixing (track 3)
- Koo Jong-pil – mixing (track 4)
- Nam Koong-jin – mixing (track 6)
- Kwon Nam-woo – mastering (all tracks)

== Charts ==
=== Weekly charts ===
Weekly chart performance for Wish You Hell
Chart (2024)	Peak position
Japanese Albums (Oricon)	33
Japanese Digital Albums (Oricon)	34
Japanese Hot Albums (Billboard Japan)	28
South Korean Albums (Circle)	2

=== Monthly charts ===
Monthly chart performance for Wish You Hell
Chart (2024)	Position
South Korean Albums (Circle)	16

== Release history ==
Release history for Wish You Hell
Region	Date	Format	Label
South Korea	March 12, 2024	CD	SM; Kakao
Various	March 12, 2024	Digital download; streaming	SM; Kakao
