= Cerulean Verge =

- Digital cover

EP by Wendy
- Released: September 10, 2025
- Length: 17:26
- Language: Korean
- Label: Asnd

Wendy chronology
Wish You Hell (2024)	Cerulean Verge (2025)

Singles from Cerulean Verge
- 1. "Sunkiss" Released: September 10, 2025

Cerulean Verge is the third extended play by South Korean singer Wendy. It was released by Asnd on September 10, 2025, and contains six tracks, including the lead single "Sunkiss".

== Background and release ==
On August 25, 2025, Asnd announced that Wendy would release her third extended play, Cerulean Verge, on September 10. On the same day, the music video for the track "Believe" was released, followed a day later by the release of the promotional schedule. On August 27, the track listing was released with "Sunkiss" announced as the lead single. Concepts films were released on August 28, September 1, and September 3. On September 5, the highlight medley video was released. On September 8, the music video film for "Sunkiss" was released, followed by the music video teaser a day later. The extended play alongside the music video for "Sunkiss" was released on September 10.

== Track listing ==
Track listing for Cerulean Verge
No.	Title	Lyrics	Music	Arrangement	Length
1.	"Fireproof"	Luck (153/Joombas); Lee Soo-bin (153/Joombas); Tomy	John-Emil Johansson; Emelie Eriksson; 153/Joombas; Tomy; Ohu	John-Emil Johansson; Ohu	2:54
2.	"Sunkiss"	Tomy; Shinhee (Inhouse); Xhoi (MUMW)	Sophia Brenan; Mathias Wang; Hilda Stenmalm; Tomy; Ohu	Mathias Wang; Ohu; Tomy	2:58
3.	"Existential Crisis"	Ben Samama; Julianne Hope; Maris Ward; Tomy; Wendy	Ben Samama; Julianne Hope; Maris Ward	Julianne Hope	2:23
4.	"Hate^{2}"	Wendy; Frankie Day (The Hub); Willeijn May; Tomy	Wendy; Aftrshok (The Hub); NF; Frankie Day (The Hub); Willeijn May; Tomy	Aftrshok (The Hub); NF	3:08
5.	"Chapter You"	Haris; Lua	Haris; Lua; Bas van Daalen	Haris; Lua; Bas Van Daalen	3:09
6.	"Believe"	Kim Ji-young (MUMW); Tomy	Louis Schoorl; Nick Bradley; Sophie Alexandra Tweed-Simmons; MLite	Louis Schoorl	2:54
Total length:					17:26

== Charts ==
=== Weekly charts ===
Weekly chart performance for Cerulean Verge
Chart (2025)	Peak position
South Korean Albums (Circle)	8

=== Monthly charts ===
Monthly chart performance for Cerulean Verge
Chart (2025)	Position
South Korean Albums (Circle)	27

== Accolades ==
=== Year-end lists ===
Year-end lists
Publication	List	Rank	Ref.
Billboard	The 25 Best K-Pop Albums of 2025: Staff Picks	18	

== Release history ==
Release history for Cerulean Verge
Region	Date	Format	Label
South Korea	September 10, 2025	CD	Asnd
Various	September 10, 2025	Digital download; streaming	Asnd
