= How Are U Bread =

2020 South Korean-Chinese web drama

- Promotional poster
- Hangul: 하와유브레드
- RR: Hawayubeuredeu
- MR: Hawayubŭredŭ
- Genre: Romance; Fantasy
- Written by: Kang Soo-yeon
- Directed by: Kim Young-joon
- Starring: Kim Jun-myeon; Lee Se-young
- Countries of origin: South Korea; China
- Original language: Korean
- No. of episodes: 5

Production
- Producer: Go Dae-hwa
- Camera setup: Single camera
- Running time: 43–46 minutes
- Production companies: SAYON Media; Kwanya Media

Original release
- Network: Seezn
- Release: January 17 – February 15, 2020

How Are U Bread (Korean: 하와유브레드; RR: Hawayubeuredeu) is a 2020 South Korean-Chinese web drama starring Kim Jun-myeon and Lee Se-young. The drama will be aired in South Korea (via the KT-owned streaming website Seezn) and China simultaneously and is currently in discussion to air in 30 other countries.

== Synopsis ==
A love story between Han Do-woo (Kim Jun-myeon) a genius patisserie, and Noh Mi-rae (Lee Se-young) a variety show writer.

== Cast ==
=== Main ===
- Kim Jun-myeon as Han Do-woo

A pastry chef, who makes bread that grants people's wishes.

- Lee Se-young as Noh Mi-rae

A script writer for a variety program that infiltrates the bakery in order to cast Ha Do-woo.

=== Supporting ===
- Kang Pil-sun as Damon
- Moon Ji-yoon as Patrick
- Han So-young as Do Do-hae
- Sora Jung as President Bang
- Lim Byung-gi
- Seo Jeong-yeon as Writer Witch
- Lee Ki-chan as Jo Yeon-chul
- Yoon Jin-young as Team Chief Kang
- Ryu Hye-rin as Writer Lee
- Lim Seung-joon
- Lee Soo-ryun as Chae Byung's wife
- Yoo Se-hyung as MC Park
- Kim Dong-hwan as Secretary Oh
- Lee Ryun-kyung as Do Woo-mo
- Seo Jin-won as Hiromura
- Kim In-jung as Shop Lady

=== Special appearances ===
- Oh Sang-jin as program host (Ep. 1–5)
- Choi Moon-soon as Gangwon's governor (Ep. 3)
- Joo Eun-jung as Gangwon's state officer (Ep. 3)

== Production ==
Filming began in April 2016 and finished in May 2016.

== Original soundtrack ==
=== Part 1 ===
Released on February 1, 2020
No.	Title	Lyrics	Music	Artist	Length
1.	"Sedansogu" (세상에 단 하나뿐인 소중한 그대)	Ajussen; Lee Eun-seok	Ajussen	Suho (EXO)	3:56
2.	"Sedansogu" (Inst.)		Ajussen		3:56
Total length:					7:52

=== Part 2 ===
Released on February 11, 2020
No.	Title	Lyrics	Music	Artist	Length
1.	"Loved" (사랑해서)	Ajussen	Ajussen	Elaine	4:04
2.	"Loved" (Inst.)		Ajussen		4:04
Total length:					8:08

=== Part 3 ===
Released on February 14, 2020
No.	Title	Lyrics	Music	Artist	Length
1.	"The Second Farewell" (두번의 이별)	Ajussen	Ajussen	Minjae (Tahiti); Anso	3:17
2.	"The Second Farewell" (Inst.)		Ajussen		3:17
Total length:					6:34

=== Part 4 ===
Released on February 19, 2020
No.	Title	Lyrics	Music	Artist	Length
1.	"Algo"	Ajussen	Ajussen	Live High	2:47
2.	"Algo" (Inst.)		Ajussen		2:47
Total length:					5:34

=== Part 5 ===
Released on February 27, 2020
No.	Title	Lyrics	Music	Artist	Length
1.	"Beautiful Tonight"	Ra.L; Naomi	Ra.L	CJM	4:01
