= Yoo Se-rye =

South Korean actress (born 1984)

- Born: Yoo Hee-jeong; March 16, 1984 (age 42)
- Education: Seoul Institute of the Arts - Theater
- Occupation: Actress
- Years active: 2003–present

Korean name
- Hangul: 유희정
- RR: Yu Huijeong
- MR: Yu Hŭijŏng

Stage name
- Hangul: 유세례
- RR: Yu Serye
- MR: Yu Serye

Yoo Se-rye (Korean: 유세례; born March 16, 1984), birth name Yoo Hee-jeong, is a South Korean actress.

== Filmography ==
=== Television series ===
Year	Title	Role
2006	Jumong	So-si, Lady Ye So-ya's maid
2007–2008	First Wives' Club	Hong Bo-hae
2009	My Too Perfect Sons	
2011	Sign	Mi-young
2011–2012	Ojakgyo Family	
2011–2012	Living in Style	Eun Geun-hee
2012–2013	The Sons	Ha Seon-joo
2012–2014	Hometown Over the Hill 2	Kim Hwa-young
2013	Nine	Sung Eun-joo in 2012
2015	But the Lush Day	Go Yeon-jeong
2016	Another Miss Oh	Chan-joo
2016–2017	Our Gap-soon	Jung Man-joo
2024	Missing Crown Prince	Queen Yoon

=== Film ===
Year	Title	Role
2003	Crazy First Love	
2003	Circle	Cho-seon
2006	Vampire Cop Ricky	Yeon-hee's friend 2
2006	Sundays in August	bookstall owner
