= Missing Crown Prince =

2024 South Korean television series

- Promotional poster
- Hangul: 세자가 사라졌다
- Hanja: 世子가 사라졌다
- Lit.: The Crown Prince Has Disappeared
- RR: Sejaga sarajeotda
- MR: Sejaga sarajŏtta
- Genre: Period drama; Romantic comedy
- Written by: Park Chul; Kim Ji-soo
- Directed by: Kim Jin-man; Kim Sang-hoon
- Starring: Suho; Hong Ye-ji; Myung Se-bin; Kim Joo-hun; Kim Min-kyu
- Music by: Kim Soo-han
- Country of origin: South Korea
- Original language: Korean
- No. of episodes: 20

Production
- Executive producers: Hwang Hyuk (CP); Park Sung-soo; Cho Hang-no; Joo Hyung-jin
- Producers: Ahn Chang-jo; Seo Jang-won; Kim Man-tae; Ryu Seung-min
- Cinematography: Jung Seung-woo; Lee Myung-joon; Kim Ho-joon; Kim Jin-han
- Editors: Ahn Na; Lee Ji-yoon
- Production companies: Studio Jidam; Chorokbaem Media; Superbook Co., Ltd.
- Budget: ₩20 billion

Original release
- Network: MBN
- Release: April 13 – June 16, 2024

Missing Crown Prince (Korean: 세자가 사라졌다) is a 2024 South Korean television series written by Kim Ji-soo and Park Chul, directed by Kim Jin-man, and starring Suho, Hong Ye-ji, Myung Se-bin, Kim Joo-hun, and Kim Min-kyu. It aired on MBN from April 13, to June 16, 2024, every Saturday and Sunday at 21:40 (KST). It is also available for streaming on TVING and Wavve in South Korea, and on Viki and Viu in selected regions.

== Synopsis ==
Set in Joseon, the series is about a crown prince who is kidnapped by the woman destined to be his wife. While fleeing for their lives, romance blooms between them.

== Cast and characters ==
=== Main ===
- Suho as Yi Geon
  - Jung Hyeon-jun as young Yi Geon

King Haejong's eldest son who was appointed as the crown prince when his father ascended to the throne through a rebellion.

- Hong Ye-ji as Choi Myung-yoon

A person who has outstanding skills in horseback riding and medicine.

- Myung Se-bin as Min Soo-ryun

A Queen Dowager.

- Kim Joo-hun as Choi Sang-rok

Choi Myung-yoon's father who is a royal physician at naeuiwon.

- Kim Min-kyu as Grand Prince Doseong
  - Yang Hee-won as young Grand Prince Doseong

Yi Geon's half-brother who has excellent martial arts skills.

- Yoo Se-rye as Queen Yoon

King Haejong's second wife who is an affectionate and empathetic person.

=== Supporting ===
- Jeon Jin-oh as King Haejong

The current King of Joseon who is also the father of Yi Geon and Grand Prince Doseong.

- Cha Kwang-soo as Yoon Yi-gyeom

Queen Yoon's father who is the Second State Councillor.

- Kim Seol-jin as Gap-seok

A royal attendant at the crown prince's residence and Yi Geon's companion.

- Park Sung-yeon as Court Lady Kim

Queen Dowager Min's lady-in-waiting.

- Son Jong-bum as Yoon Jeong-dae

Head of the capital bureau.

- Bang Jae-ho as Mu-baek

Choi Sang-rok's right-hand man and bodyguard.

- Kim No-jin as Oh-wol

Choi Myung-yoon's maid.

- Hayden Won as Cheol-du

Grand Prince Doseong's confidant.

- Park Sung-woo as Heo Jin-soo

The Royal Physician.

- Jung Yoon-seo as Court Lady Cho

Queen Yoon's lady-in-waiting.

- Kim Sung-hyun as Han Sang-su

Yi Geon's eunuch.

- Kim Tae-geun as Kim Dae-seung

An official at the Office of Censors.

- Park Gi-deok as the chief of naesi and King Haejong's eunuch
- Choi Jong-yoon as Jung-yeong

A royal guard.

- Nam Kyung-eup as Daegam Mun-hyeong

Yi Geon's maternal grandfather.

== Production ==
=== Development ===
The series was written by Kim Ji-soo and Park Chul, who both wrote Bossam: Steal the Fate (2021), and directed by Kim Jin-man, who worked on Kill Me, Heal Me (2015) and Stealer: The Treasure Keeper (2023). Filming began in 2023.

In October 2023, production companies Chorokbaem Media and Superbook Co., Ltd. signed a business agreement with Mungyeong to support the production of the series.

=== Casting ===
Suho, Hong Ye-ji, Kim Min-kyu, and Myung Se-bin were reportedly cast in 2023, and they were confirmed as the main casts of the series along with Kim Joo-hun.

== Release ==
MBN confirmed the premiere date of Missing Crown Prince, which originally was set to be on March 9 but was postponed to April 13, 2024, instead, and will air every Saturday and Sunday at 21:40 (KST). It is also available for steaming on TVING, Wavve, Viki, and Viu.

== Original soundtrack ==
=== Part 1 ===
Released on May 4, 2024
No.	Title	Lyrics	Music	Artist	Length
1.	"Love You More Gradually" (아스라이, 더 가까이)	Kim Chang-rak (Aiming); Kim Soo-bin (Aiming); Grace H	Kim Chang-rak (Aiming); Kim Soo-bin (Aiming); Jo Se-hee (Aiming)	Suho	3:57
2.	"Love You More Gradually" (아스라이, 더 가까이; Inst.)		Kim Chang-rak (Aiming); Kim Soo-bin (Aiming); Jo Se-hee (Aiming)		3:57
Total length:					7:54

=== Part 2 ===
Released on May 11, 2024
No.	Title	Lyrics	Music	Artist	Length
1.	"Stay By My Side" (내 곁에 있어요)	Kim Soo-bin (Aiming)	Kim Chang-rak (Aiming); Kim Soo-bin (Aiming); Jo Se-hee (Aiming); Kwon Soo-hyun (Aiming)	Taeil	3:53
2.	"Stay By My Side" (내 곁에 있어요; Inst.)		Kim Chang-rak (Aiming); Kim Soo-bin (Aiming); Jo Se-hee (Aiming); Kwon Soo-hyun (Aiming)		3:53
Total length:					7:46

=== Part 3 ===
Released on May 18, 2024
No.	Title	Lyrics	Music	Artist	Length
1.	"Breath" (한숨)	Ha Jeong-hyeon	249; Ha Jeong-hyeon	Yves (Loona)	4:22
2.	"Breath" (한숨; Inst.)		249; Ha Jeong-hyeon		4:22
Total length:					8:44

== Viewership ==
Missing Crown Prince : South Korea viewers per episode (thousands)

Season	Episode number																			
Season	1	2	3	4	5	6	7	8	9	10	11	12	13	14	15	16	17	18	19	20
1	332	N/A	550	556	572	482	503	817	693	732	792	798	659	759	751	837	1020	1036	900	987

Source: Audience measurement performed nationwide by Nielsen Korea.

Average TV viewership ratings
Ep.	Original broadcast date	Average audience share (Nielsen Korea)	
Ep.	Original broadcast date	Nationwide	Seoul
1	April 13, 2024	1.452% (14th)	N/A
2	April 14, 2024	1.148% (21st)	N/A
3	April 20, 2024	2.623% (2nd)	2.444% (2nd)
4	April 21, 2024	2.511% (4th)	2.174% (5th)
5	April 27, 2024	2.792% (2nd)	2.159% (3rd)
6	April 28, 2024	2.376% (4th)	1.847% (4th)
7	May 4, 2024	2.345% (3rd)	1.753% (5th)
8	May 5, 2024	3.636% (1st)	3.519% (1st)
9	May 11, 2024	3.237% (1st)	2.924% (2nd)
10	May 12, 2024	3.086% (3rd)	2.470% (3rd)
11	May 18, 2024	3.783% (2nd)	3.317% (2nd)
12	May 19, 2024	3.826% (2nd)	3.899% (2nd)
13	May 25, 2024	2.944% (2nd)	2.791% (2nd)
14	May 26, 2024	3.734% (2nd)	3.457% (2nd)
15	June 1, 2024	3.542% (2nd)	3.197% (2nd)
16	June 2, 2024	3.976% (1st)	3.809% (2nd)
17	June 8, 2024	4.350% (1st)	4.023% (2nd)
18	June 9, 2024	4.517% (2nd)	4.504% (2nd)
19	June 15, 2024	4.244% (1st)	3.847% (2nd)
20	June 16, 2024	5.059% (1st)	4.833% (1st)
Average		3.259%	— (Note: Due to multiple unpublished ratings, the exact average rating is unknown.)
In the table above, the blue numbers represent the lowest ratings and the red numbers represent the highest ratings.; N/A denotes ratings that were not published.; This drama aired on a cable channel/pay TV which normally has a relatively smaller audience compared to free-to-air TV/public broadcasters (KBS, SBS, MBC, and EBS).
