= Like Water (Wendy song) =

2021 single by Wendy

Single by Wendy

from the EP Like Water
- Released: April 5, 2021
- Studio: SM Studio, Seoul, South Korea
- Genre: Pop; rock
- Length: 4:20
- Label: SM; Dreamus
- Composers: Coach & Sendo; Anne Judith Stokke Wik
- Lyricists: Kenzie; Yoo Young-jin

Wendy singles chronology
| "When This Rain Stops" (2021) | "Like Water" (2021) | "Wish You Hell" (2024) |

Music video
- "Like Water" on YouTube

"Like Water" is a song recorded by South Korean singer Wendy for her first extended play of the same name. Composed by production team Coach & Sendo and Anne Judith Stokke Wik from Dsign Music, together with Kenzie and Yoo Young-jin, it is an acoustic pop ballad and modern rock song. It was released on April 5, 2021, by SM Entertainment, along with an accompanying music video.

== Background and release ==
According to the South Korean entertainment outlet StarNews, Wendy will release her solo debut on April. Following the report, SM Entertainment told Sports Kyunghyang to look forward to it. Prior to 2021, she suffered a pelvic fracture and broken wrist, among other injuries and had been on a year-long hiatus due to a stage accident during the 2019 SBS Gayo Daejeon music festival. On March 24, it was officially announced that Wendy will be having her solo debut. The first batch of teaser photos were on the Red Velvet's official social media accounts. "Like Water" had its official digital release on April 5, 2021, along with the extended play of the same name.

== Composition ==
"Like Water" was composed by production team Coach & Sendo and Anne Judith Stokke Wik; the lyrics were written by Kenzie and Yoo Young-jin. Wendy stated that she wrote the lyrics "I just wanted to thank you for believing in me" inspired by the fans and voiced it with particular affection. She revealed that "Like Water" is about hope and gratitude, and was a healing song written for her fans.

"Like Water"
"Like Water" is an acoustic pop ballad and modern rock song that conveys a message of hope and gratitude.

Musically, "Like Water" was described as an acoustic pop ballad and modern rock song. Hwang Hye-jin of Newsen noted the track for harmonizing "lyrical guitar riffs, bands, and string sounds". JT Early of Beats Per Minute called it as a song with "an enchanting pop-rock ballad with warm guitar, soaring strings and a general sense of triumph". The song is composed in the key of G major with a tempo of 84 beats per minute. Lyrically, the song compares each other's existence and meaning to "water," which is indispensable in life, further adding to the message of hope for a new journey with gratitude to the precious people who stood by her side. Ruby C of NME described how the song represents people needing one another and helping to fill each other up, "just as a person should not be without water".

== Critical reception ==
Following its initial release, "Like Water" was met with mixed reviews from music critics. JT Early of Beats Per Minute called the song as "a very satisfying and cinematic song that could easily soundtrack the moment when a difficult obstacle has finally been surmounted." The track was featured on MTV News' Bop Shop where it was described as "an ethereal acoustic ballad", complimenting Wendy's "effortlessly flits from delicate humming to phenomenal high notes". Divyansha Dongre of Rolling Stone India complimented the "vocal abilities as she experiments with different ranges throughout the track", further citing the reinforcement of signature high-notes on the chorus. Tamar Herman of South China Morning Post described the song as a "whimsy of the sweet, sentimental soft pop", further adding the song as "bolstered by soaring string instrumentals". Claire Dodson of Teen Vouge praised the track for its "soaring bridge notes" that "are cinematic and moving", and concluded that it makes "one perfect for the turning point in a coming-of-age film". Erin Han of Idology noted the song as it "may feel boring due to the explosive power of "When This Rain Stops"", clarifying that "the warmth of the song continues for a long time, enhancing its persuasive power as a title song". Jung Da-yeol of IZM compared similarity of the acoustic guitar introduction of the track to Taeyeon's "Fine", but explained that it "has become richer with the addition of string sound". Ruby C of NME noted the song for being "at times strangely familiar" that the song could have also been sung by Taeyeon, further noticing the "feels like it follows a more tried-and-tested songwriting formula".

"Like Water" was included in NME's The 15 best K-pop songs of 2021 – so far list, emphasizing the "warm embrace" feeling of the song, further praising Wendy's straightforward metaphor use of "water", calling it a "a simple yet poetic symbolism". The song landed on Billboard's 25 Best K-Pop Songs 2021 list at number 23, with J.B. praising it for "acting as a gorgeous soundscape for Wendy to unleash one of her best vocal performances to date".

== Commercial performance ==
"Like Water" debuted at number 54 on the 15th weekly issue of South Korea's Gaon Digital Chart for 2021 during the period dated April 4–10. It also debuted at number 85 and number 87 on the Gaon Download Chart and Gaon Streaming Chart, respectively. In addition, it debuted at number 21 on the component BGM chart. The song entered the Billboard K-Pop Hot 100 at number 85 on the chart issue dated April 17, 2021.

== Promotion ==
The accompanying music video for "Like Water" was directed by video director Lee Rae-kyung. The music video for the song was premiered on April 5, 2021, to coincide with the release of the song and that of Like Water. Prior to its premiere date, the music video was teased with two teasers. The music video is set in a mansion filled with overgrown plants. It adopts a neo-royalty cinematography. Following the music video's release, Kayla Fontalvo of Glitter Magazine noted the "aesthetics of the video", bringing out Wendy's visuals in floral sets.

Wendy delivered her first performance of "Like Water" at SBS PowerFM's Cultwo Show. On April 9, 2021, she made her debut stage on Music Bank. She then performed the song on KBS CoolFM on the same day. Throughout promotions, the singer continued to perform the song on Inkigayo, M Countdown and Show! Music Core.

== Credits and personnel ==
Credits adapted from the liner notes of Like Water.

Studio

- Recorded, edited, engineered for mix, and mixed at SM Booming System
- Recorded at Personally Favorite Music Company
- Mastered at Sonic Korea

Personnel

- Wendy – vocals
- Kenzie – Korean songwriting
- Yoo Young-jin – Korean songwriting, vocal directing, recording, digital editing, mixing engineer, mixing
- Coach & Sendo – composition, arrangement, drum, bass, piano
- Anne Judith Stokke Wik – composition, background vocals
- Park Sung-bum – guitar
- Ed G.Noyeel – string arrangement, recording
- Lee Yong-dae – string
- Kim Han-geul – string
- No So-yeon – string
- Baek Ji-hyun – string
- Jin Yu-ri – string
- Shim Yeon-hee – string
- Choi Ri-jeong – string
- Kim So-eun – string
- Cheon Hoon – mastering
- Shin Soo-min – mastering assistant

== Charts ==
=== Weekly charts ===
Weekly chart performance for "Like Water"
| Chart (2021) | Peak position |
|---|---|
| South Korea (Gaon) | 54 |
| South Korea (K-pop Hot 100) | 85 |

=== Monthly charts ===
Monthly chart performance for "Like Water"
| Chart (April 2021) | Position |
|---|---|
| South Korea (Gaon) | 113 |

== Release history ==
Release dates and formats for "Like Water"
| Region | Date | Format(s) | Label(s) | Ref. |
|---|---|---|---|---|
| Various | April 5, 2021 | Digital download; streaming | SM Entertainment; Dreamus | |
