= Grey Suit =

- Color version and digital cover

EP by Suho
- Released: April 4, 2022
- Studios: SM SSAM (Seoul); SM Starlight (Seoul); SM Yellow Tail (Seoul)
- Genres: Alternative rock; Britpop; progressive rock
- Length: 22:35
- Language: Korean
- Labels: SM; Dreamus
- Producers: Lee Soo-man; Park Moon-chi; Gila; Park Seul-gi; Oi; John OFA Rhee; Bymore; Alysa

Suho chronology
| Self-Portrait (2020) | Grey Suit (2022) | 1 to 3 (2024) |

Singles from Grey Suit
- 1. "Grey Suit" Released: April 4, 2022; 2. "Hurdle" Released: April 7, 2022

Grey Suit is the second extended play by South Korean singer Suho. It was released on April 4, 2022, by SM Entertainment. The EP contains six tracks including the lead single of the same name. The physical album is available in three versions two photobook versions and one digipack version

== Background and release ==
On March 10, 2022, SM Entertainment announced that Suho will release his second solo album in April 2022. On March 14, 2022, it was announced that Suho will release his second extended play Grey Suit on April 4.

== Track listing ==
Grey Suit track listing
| No. | Title | Lyrics | Music | Arrangement | Length |
|---|---|---|---|---|---|
| 1. | "Morning Star" | Noday; Gila; Park Moonchi; SH2O | Park Moonchi; Oiaisle; Gila; Noday | Gila; Park Moonchi | 4:06 |
| 2. | "Grey Suit" | Jo Yoon-kyung; SH2O | Park Seul-gi (153/Joombas); Oi (153/Joombas) | Park Seul-gi (153/Joombas); Oi (153/Joombas) | 3:42 |
| 3. | "Hurdle" | Gila; Noday; Oiaisle; Park Moonchi; SH2O | Oiaisle; Park Moonchi; Gila; Noday | Park Moon-chi | 3:06 |
| 4. | "Decanting" | Bymore; John OFA Rhee; Oiaisle; SH2O | Oiaisle; Rhee; Bymore | Rhee; Bymore | 3:52 |
| 5. | "Bear Hug" (Korean: 이리 溫; RR: Iri On) | Bymore; Rhee; Oiaisle; SH2O | Oiaisle; Rhee; Bymore | Rhee; Bymore | 4:28 |
| 6. | "Moment" (Korean: 75분의 1초; RR: 75 Bun-ui 1 Cho; lit. '1/75th of a Second') | Moon Seol-ri; SH2O | Andy Love; ALYSA | ALYSA | 3:19 |
| Total length: | | | | | 22:35 |

== Charts ==
=== Weekly charts ===
Weekly chart performance of Grey Suit
| Chart | Peak position |
|---|---|
| Japanese Albums (Oricon) | 12 |
| Japanese Hot Albums (Billboard Japan) | 9 |
| South Korean Albums (Gaon) | 2 |
| UK Album Downloads (Official Charts) | 88 |

=== Monthly charts ===
Monthly chart performance for Grey Suit
| Chart (2022) | Peak position |
|---|---|
| South Korean Albums (Gaon) | 5 |

=== Year-end charts ===
Year-end chart performance for Grey Suit
| Chart (2022) | Position |
|---|---|
| South Korean Albums (Circle) | 66 |

== Release history ==
Release dates and formats for Grey Suit
| Region | Date | Format | Label(s) |
|---|---|---|---|
| Various | April 4, 2022 | Digital download; streaming | SM |
| South Korea | April 4, 2022 | CD | SM; Dreamus |
