= Like Water (EP) =

- Digital version cover

EP by Wendy
- Released: April 5, 2021
- Genre: Pop; rock
- Length: 18:56
- Language: Korean
- Label: SM; Dreamus

Wendy chronology
Like Water (2021)	Wish You Hell (2024)

Singles from Like Water
- 1. "When This Rain Stops" Released: April 5, 2021; 2. "Like Water" Released: April 5, 2021

Alternative cover
- Case version cover (standard)

Professional ratings
Review scores
Source	Rating
Beats Per Minute	78%
IZM	3.5/5 stars
NME	4/5 stars

Like Water is the debut extended play by South Korean singer Wendy. The EP was released on April 5, 2021, by SM Entertainment and consists of five tracks, including the two title tracks, "When This Rain Stops" and "Like Water". The EP makes Wendy the first Red Velvet member to make a solo debut.

== Background ==
News of the EP was first reported on March 10 by South Korean entertainment outlet StarNews. The publication had claimed that Wendy was working on a solo album planned for release in April. Shortly after the report, SM confirmed that the singer would release a solo project sometime next month, although a specific date had not been announced at the time. "Wendy is working with the goal of releasing a solo album in April. Please look forward to it," the company stated. Prior to the EP's release, Wendy had been on a year-long hiatus due to a stage accident during the 2019 SBS Gayo Daejeon music festival. She suffered a pelvic fracture and broken wrist, among other injuries, and had to be hospitalized for two months.

The official music video teaser for the title track was released on YouTube and Naver TV via SM Entertainment's official channels at midnight on April 2. A second teaser was released the next day, which features Wendy looking glowing as she is bathed in sunset like glow, in this amber-colored teaser. She is surrounded by water droplets and fresh flowers and a heavenly instrumental sound fills the background. Towards the end, Wendy hits the high-notes, standing in a red dress.The video was released alongside the song on April 5 and features Wendy performing the song alone in a mansion filled with overgrown plants. It also features shots of the singer in a glass pavilion, similarly surrounded by bright red flora.

== Composition ==
The EP contains five tracks. "Like Water" is described as an acoustic pop ballad characterized by Wendy's pure vocals. Written by prominent South Korean songwriters Kenzie and Yoo Young-jin, the song offers Wendy's deepest epiphanies as she reflects on her blessings from those who've been by her side at every step of life. The gentle mix of guitar and band sounds in the song keep the rhythm ebullient before she wraps up with a soothing outro and reinforces the chorus with her signature high-notes.

"When This Rain Stops" is a piano ballad that sends a message of empathy and strength. The song is backed with a slight yet steady piano melody combined with Wendy's dynamic vocals. There is very little scope for her to rest throughout the song which delivers a sense of urgency to the narrative. The lyrics seem heavily influenced by her own personal experience in the past year when she struggled with recovery in an atmosphere of uncertainty. "Why Can't You Love Me?" is a cheerful spring inspired track about a one sided love. "The Road" is a modern rock song. "Best Friend" features fellow Red Velvet bandmate Seulgi and explores various genres ranging from pop to rock.

== Track listing ==
Like Water track listing
No.	Title	Lyrics	Music	Arrangement	Length
1.	"When This Rain Stops"	minGtion	minGtion	minGtion	4:03
2.	"Like Water"	Kenzie; Yoo Young-jin	Coach&Sendo; Anne Judith Stokke Wik	Coach&Sendo	4:20
3.	"Why Can't You Love Me?"	Koo Tae-woo	Jamie Jones; Matt Wong; Lamont Neuble; Tim Stewart; Paulina "Pau" Cerrilla	Jamie Jones; Matt Wong; Lamont Neuble; Tim Stewart; Paulina "Pau" Cerrilla	2:48
4.	"The Road" (Korean: 초행길; RR: Chohaenggil)	Lee Ju-hyung	Lee Ju-hyung; Kwon Ae-jin	Lee Ju-hyung	4:15
5.	"Best Friend" (with Seulgi)	Kim Yeon-seo	minGtion; Kim Yeon-seo	minGtion	3:30
Total length:					18:56

Vinyl LP bonus tracks
No.	Title	Music	Arrangement	Length
6.	"When This Rain Stops (instrumental)"	minGtion	minGtion	4:03
7.	"Like Water (instrumental)"	Coach&Sendo; Anne Judith Stokke Wik	Coach&Sendo	4:20
Total length:				27:19

== Charts ==
=== Weekly charts ===
Weekly chart performance for Like Water
Chart (2021)	Peak position
Japanese Albums (Oricon)	35
Japanese Hot Albums (Billboard Japan)	71
South Korean Albums (Gaon)	4

=== Monthly charts ===
Monthly chart performance for Like Water
Chart (2021)	Peak position
South Korean Albums (Gaon)	7

=== Year-end charts ===
Year-end chart performance for Like Water
Chart (2021)	Position
South Korean Albums (Gaon)	66

== Release history ==
Release history for Like Water
Region	Date	Format	Label
Various	April 5, 2021	CD; digital download; streaming	SM Entertainment; Dreamus
South Korea	May 28, 2021	LP	SM Entertainment
