= Exo discography =

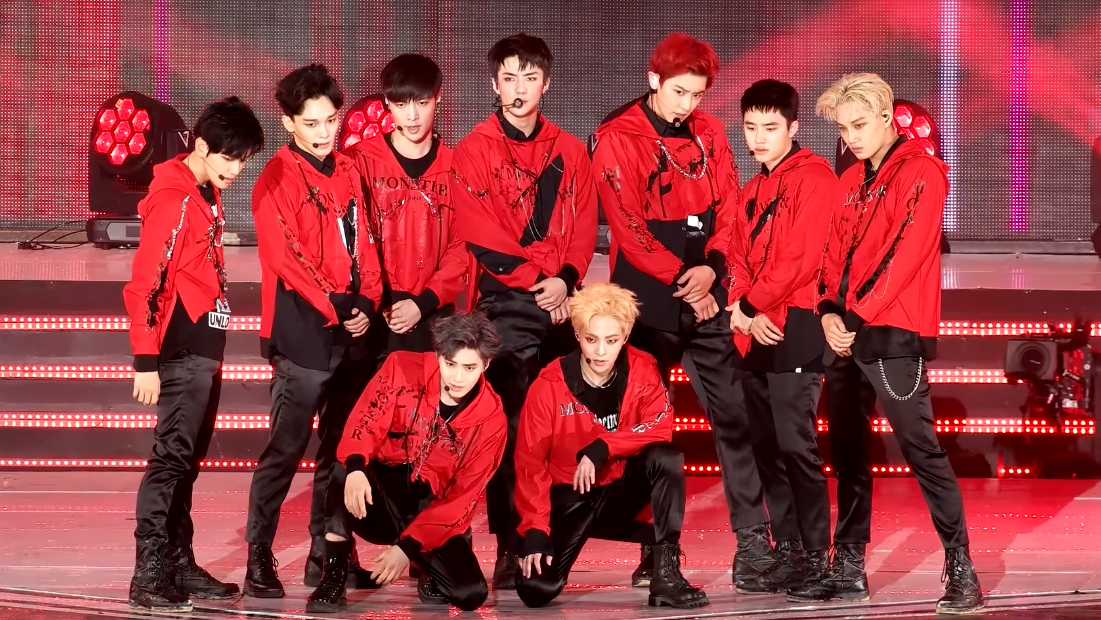
- EXO performing in 2016
- Studio albums: 8
- Extended plays: 7
- Live albums: 4
- Singles: 28
- Music videos: 52
- Reissues: 5

The discography of the South Korean-Chinese boy band Exo consists of eight studio albums (five of which have been reissued under different titles), seven extended plays, four live albums and twenty-eight singles. Exo was formed by the Korean entertainment company SM Entertainment in 2011, and formerly consisted of twelve members separated into two sub-groups, Exo-K and Exo-M, releasing the same music simultaneously in both Korean and Mandarin in South Korea and China, respectively. The group's first release, the extended play Mama, was released in April 2012. The album topped Korean music charts on its release. With the release of Don't Mess Up My Tempo in November 2018, Exo became the first South Korean artist who debuted in the 21st century to sell 10 million albums cumulatively.

In 2023, Exo became "septuple million sellers", meaning the band has sold over one million copies apiece for seven different albums. (Note: Three albums – XOXO, Exodus, and Ex'Act, exceeded one million mark by combining sales of its repackages.) Since their debut in 2012, the group has sold 23.8 million downloads as of December 2017, and more than 11.9 million physical albums as of August 2019, in South Korea.

== Albums ==
=== Studio albums ===
==== Korean / Chinese studio albums ====
List of Korean / Chinese studio albums, with selected details, chart positions, sales, and certifications
Title	Details	Peak positions									Sales	Certifications (Note: In April 2018, Gaon Chart introduced music recording certifications for albums, downloads and streamings.)
Title	Details	KOR	AUS	BEL (FL)	CAN	FRA	JPN	UK Dig.	US	US World	Sales	Certifications
XOXO	Released: June 3, 2013; Label: SM Entertainment; Formats: CD, digital download, streaming	1 (Note: The Chinese version of the album peaked at number 2.)	—	—	—	—	9 (Note: The Chinese version of the album peaked at number 18.)	—	—	1	KOR: 579,874; JPN: 148,000; US: 6,000	—N/a
Exodus	Released: March 30, 2015; Label: SM Entertainment; Formats: CD, digital download, streaming	1	—	—	—	—	4 (Note: The Chinese version of the album peaked at number 7.)	—	95	1	KOR: 808,358; JPN: 83,226; US: 11,000	—N/a
Ex'Act	Released: June 9, 2016; Label: SM Entertainment; Formats: CD, digital download, streaming	1	—	—	—	—	5 (Note: The Chinese version of the album peaked at number 16.)	—	—	2	KOR: 836,116; JPN: 61,918	—N/a
The War	Released: July 19, 2017; Label: SM Entertainment; Formats: CD, digital download, streaming	1	—	92	76	— (Note: The War did not enter the Top Albums Chart, but peaked at number 24 on the component Digital chart.)	7 (Note: The Chinese version of the album peaked at number 35.)	27	87	1	KOR: 1,132,625; JPN: 51,285; US: 11,000	—N/a
Don't Mess Up My Tempo	Released: November 2, 2018; Label: SM Entertainment; Formats: CD, digital download, streaming	1	67	84	74	191	3	19	23	1	KOR: 1,445,329; JPN: 67,889; US: 50,000	KMCA: Million
Obsession	Released: November 27, 2019; Label: SM Entertainment; Formats: CD, digital download, streaming	1	— (Note: Obsession did not enter the ARIA Albums Chart, but peaked at number 22 on the ARIA Digital Album Chart.)	124	—	—	16	37	182	1	KOR: 843,305; JPN: 24,275; US: 6,000	KMCA: 3× Platinum
Exist	Released: July 10, 2023; Label: SM Entertainment; Formats: CD, SMC, digital download, streaming	1	—	—	—	—	5	33	—	—	WW: 2,300,000; KOR: 1,898,918; JPN: 29,676	KMCA: Million; KMCA: Platinum (SMC Version)
Reverxe	Released: January 19, 2026; Label: SM Entertainment; Formats: CD, SMC, digital download, streaming	1	—	—	—	—	8	29	—	—	KOR: 1,009,991; JPN: 8,646	KMCA: 3× Platinum
"—" denotes releases that did not chart or were not released in that region.

==== Japanese studio albums ====
List of Japanese studio albums, with selected details, chart positions, sales, and certifications
Title	Details	Peak positions			Sales	Certifications (Note: In April 2018, Gaon Chart introduced music recording certifications for albums, downloads and streamings.)
Title	Details	FRA Dig.	JPN	US World	Sales	Certifications
Countdown	Released: January 31, 2018; Label: Avex Trax; Formats: CD, digital download, streaming	126	1	4	JPN: 123,912	RIAJ: Gold

=== Reissues ===
List of reissues, with selected details, chart positions, sales, and certifications
Title	Details	Peak positions			Sales	Certifications (Note: In April 2018, Gaon Chart introduced music recording certifications for albums, downloads and streamings.)
Title	Details	KOR	FRA Dig.	US World	Sales	Certifications
XOXO (Repackage)	Released:: August 5, 2013; Label: SM Entertainment; Formats: CD, digital download, streaming	1	—	—	KOR: 763,660	—N/a
Love Me Right	Released: June 3, 2015; Label: SM Entertainment; Formats: CD, digital download, streaming	1	—	2	KOR: 529,796; US: 4,000	—N/a
Lotto	Released:: August 18, 2016; Label: SM Entertainment; Formats: CD, digital download, streaming	1	—	10	KOR: 410,036	—N/a
The War: The Power of Music	Released: September 5, 2017; Label: SM Entertainment; Formats: CD, digital download, streaming	1	36	—	KOR: 543,461	—N/a
Love Shot	Released: December 13, 2018; Label: SM Entertainment; Formats: CD, digital download, streaming	1	30	8	KOR: 530,165	KMCA: 2× Platinum
"—" denotes releases that did not chart or were not released in that region.

=== Live albums ===
List of live albums, with selected chart positions and sales figures
Title	Details	Peak chart positions		Sales
Title	Details	KOR	JPN	Sales
Exology Chapter 1: The Lost Planet	Released: December 22, 2014; Label: SM Entertainment; Formats: CD, digital download, streaming	1	22	KOR: 80,000; JPN: 10,568
Exo Planet No. 3 - The Exo'rDIUM [dot]	Released: October 25, 2017; Label: SM Entertainment; Formats: CD, digital download, streaming	—	—	
Exo Planet #4 – The EℓyXiOn [dot]	Released: January 30, 2019; Label: SM Entertainment; Formats: CD, digital download, streaming	—	90	JPN: 655
Exo Planet #5 – EXplOration	Released: April 21, 2020; Label: SM Entertainment; Formats: CD, digital download, streaming	—	—	
"—" denotes releases that did not chart or were not released in that region.

== Extended plays ==
List of extended plays, with selected chart positions and sales figures
Title	Details	Peak chart positions					Sales	Certifications
Title	Details	KOR	JPN	US	US Heat.	US World	Sales	Certifications
Mama (Exo-K and Exo-M)	Released: April 9, 2012; Label: SM Entertainment; Formats: CD, digital download, streaming	1 (Note: The Chinese version of the EP peaked at number 4.)	33 (Note: The Chinese version of the EP peaked at number 63.)	—	—	8 (Note: The Chinese version of the EP peaked at number 12.)	KOR: 548,567; JPN: 61,046	—N/a
Miracles in December	Released: December 9, 2013; Label: SM Entertainment; Formats: CD, digital download, streaming	1 (Note: The Chinese version of the EP peaked at number 2.)	7 (Note: The Chinese version of the EP peaked at number 20.)	—	35	1	KOR: 584,556; JPN: 41,327	—N/a
Overdose (Exo-K and Exo-M)	Released: May 7, 2014; Label: SM Entertainment; Formats: CD, digital download, streaming	1	3 (Note: The Chinese version of the EP peaked at number 5.)	129	1 (Note: The Chinese version of the EP peaked at number 8.)	2	KOR: 717,318; JPN: 55,782; US: 3,000	—N/a
Sing for You	Released: December 10, 2015; Label: SM Entertainment; Formats: CD, digital download, streaming	1	6	—	—	6	KOR: 561,567; JPN: 34,736	—N/a
For Life	Released: December 19, 2016; Label: SM Entertainment; Formats: CD, digital download, streaming	1	7	—	—	9	KOR: 448,138; JPN: 23,838	—N/a
Universe	Released: December 26, 2017; Label: SM Entertainment; Formats: CD, digital download, streaming	1	8	—	—	2	KOR: 574,140; JPN: 22,594	—N/a
Don't Fight the Feeling	Released: June 7, 2021; Label: SM Entertainment; Formats: CD, LP, digital download, streaming	1	3	—	—	8	KOR: 1,338,028; JPN: 49,184	KMCA: Million
"—" denotes releases that did not chart or were not released in that region.

== Singles ==
=== Korean singles ===
List of Exo singles released in Korean
Title	Year	Peak chart positions										Sales (Note: Sales figures for tracks are based on digital downloads, except noted.)	Album
Title	Year	KOR	KOR Billb. (Note: Includes the Billboard K-pop Hot 100 and South Korea Songs. The K-pop Hot 100 was introduced in August 2011, discontinued in July 2014, re-established in June 2016, and discontinued again in April 2022, after which South Korea Songs was introduced.)	CAN	JPN Hot	MLY	SGP	UK Indie	US World	VIE	WW	Sales	Album
"What Is Love"	2012	110	95	—	—	—	—	—	—	—	—	KOR: 72,749	Mama
"History"	2012	86	—	—	—	—	—	—	4	—	—	KOR: 181,698; US: 32,000	Mama
"Mama"	2012	46	89	—	—	—	—	—	—	—	—	KOR: 383,359; US: 38,000	Mama
"Wolf" (늑대와 미녀)	2013	10	25	—	—	—	—	—	4	—	—	KOR: 534,603; US: 36,000	XOXO
"Growl" (으르렁)	2013	2	3	—	—	—	—	—	3	—	—	KOR: 2,023,254; US: 62,000	XOXO (Repackage)
"Miracles in December" (12월의 기적)	2013	2	3	—	—	—	—	—	3	—	—	KOR: 789,317	Miracles in December
"Overdose" (중독)	2014	2	2	—	—	—	—	—	2	—	—	KOR: 1,168,390; US: 58,000	Overdose
"December, 2014 (The Winter's Tale)"	2014	1	—	—	—	—	—	—	14	—	—	KOR: 176,154	Exology Chapter 1: The Lost Planet
"Call Me Baby"	2015	2	—	98	—	—	—	— (Note: "Call Me Baby" peaked at number 18 on the UK Independent Singles Breakers sub-chart.)	2	—	—	KOR: 1,229,566; US: 56,000; CAN: 200	Exodus
"Love Me Right"	2015	1	—	—	33	—	—	—	3	—	—	KOR: 1,142,627; US: 34,000	Love Me Right
"Lightsaber"	2015	9	—	—	28	—	—	—	3	—	—	KOR: 242,162	Sing for You
"Sing for You"	2015	3	—	—	—	—	—	—	—	—	—	KOR: 710,424	Sing for You
"Unfair" (불공평해)	2015	10	—	—	—	—	—	—	9	—	—	KOR: 515,703	Sing for You
"Lucky One"	2016	5	—	—	—	—	—	—	3	—	—	KOR: 433,399	Ex'Act
"Monster"	2016	1	—	—	9	—	—	18	1	—	—	KOR: 830,155; US: 69,000	Ex'Act
"Lotto"	2016	2	—	—	—	—	—	— (Note: "Lotto" peaked at number 16 on the UK Independent Singles Breakers sub-chart.)	1	—	—	KOR: 433,633; US: 31,000	Lotto
"Dancing King" (with Yoo Jae-suk)	2016	2	—	—	—	—	—	—	2	—	—	KOR: 648,506	SM Station Season 1
"For Life"	2016	7	—	—	—	—	—	—	8	—	—	KOR: 215,231	For Life
"Ko Ko Bop"	2017	1	1	—	39	—	—	—	2	—	—	KOR: 1,172,609; US: 27,000	The War
"Power"	2017	2	1	—	27	—	—	—	3	—	—	KOR: 333,339; US: 9,000	The War: The Power of Music
"Universe"	2017	2	1	—	—	—	—	—	16	—	—	KOR: 140,698	Universe
"Tempo"	2018	4	1	—	26	2	11	27	2	—	—		Don't Mess Up My Tempo
"Love Shot"	2018	9	1	—	59	7	18	— (Note: "Love Shot" peaked at number 14 on the UK Independent Singles Breakers sub-chart.)	1	—	—	US: 4,000	Love Shot
"Obsession"	2019	13	5	—	33	—	—	— (Note: "Obsession" peaked at number 17 on the UK Independent Singles Breakers sub-chart.)	1	—	—	US: 2,000	Obsession
"Don't Fight the Feeling"	2021	15	57	—	77	—	—	—	6	—	64		Don't Fight the Feeling
"Let Me In"	2023	106	6	—	—	—	—	—	5	—	— (Note: "Let Me In" peaked at number 137 on the Billboard Global Excl. US chart.)	US: 1,000	Exist
"Hear Me Out"	2023	124	5	—	—	—	—	—	5	88	— (Note: "Hear Me Out" peaked at number 122 on the Billboard Global Excl. US chart.)		Exist
"Cream Soda"	2023	13	3	—	—	—	—	—	12	41	86		Exist
"Crown"	2026	29	24	—	—	—	—	—	—	—	—		Reverxe
"—" denotes releases that did not chart or were not released in that region.

=== Japanese singles ===
List of Exo singles released in Japanese
Title	Year	Peak chart positions			Sales (Note: Sales figures for tracks are based on digital downloads, except noted.)	Certifications	Album
Title	Year	JPN	JPN Hot	US World	Sales	Certifications	Album
"Love Me Right (Romantic Universe)"	2015	1	1	—	JPN: 197,008 (phy.); KOR: 11,469	RIAJ: Platinum (phy.)	Countdown
"Coming Over"	2016	2	3	—	JPN: 169,425 (phy.)	RIAJ: Platinum (phy.)	Countdown
"Electric Kiss"	2018	—	23	9			Countdown
"Bird"	2019	—	42	–			Non-album single
"—" denotes releases that did not chart or were not released in that region.

== Other charted songs ==
=== Other charted Korean / Chinese songs ===
List of other charted Korean and Chinese songs, with selected peak chart positions
Title	Year	Peak chart positions				Sales	Album
Title	Year	KOR	KOR Hot	US World	WW Excl.	Sales	Album
"Angel" (너의 세상으로)	2012	—	—	15	—	KOR: 9,733	Mama
"Two Moons" (두 개의 달이 뜨는 밤)	2012	—	—	14	—	KOR: 9,803	Mama
"Baby, Don't Cry" (인어의 눈물)	2013	31	55	6	—	KOR: 220,104	XOXO
"Black Pearl"	2013	81	99	8	—	KOR: 61,414	XOXO
"Don't Go" (나비소녀)	2013	54	58	13	—	KOR: 135,482	XOXO
"Let Out the Beast"	2013	97	—	10	—	KOR: 38,111	XOXO
"3.6.5"	2013	69	88	24	—	KOR: 117,937	XOXO
"Heart Attack"	2013	93	—	11	—	KOR: 56,060	XOXO
"Peter Pan" (피터팬)	2013	78	93	16	—	KOR: 109,823	XOXO
"Baby"	2013	100	—	20	—	KOR: 55,074	XOXO
"My Lady"	2013	64	67	—	—	KOR: 95,671	XOXO
"Wolf" (늑대와 미녀) (Exo-K version)	2013	135	—	—	—	KOR: 21,399	XOXO
"XOXO (Kisses & Hugs)"	2013	15	35	6	—	KOR: 220,617	Growl
"Lucky"	2013	17	42	7	—	KOR: 138,799	Growl
"Growl" (으르렁) (Exo-K version)	2013	64	—	—	—	KOR: 21,272	Growl
"Growl" (咆哮) (Exo-M version)	2013	82	—	—	—	KOR: 15,984	Growl
"Christmas Day"	2013	5	38	10	—	KOR: 272,296	Miracles in December
"The Star"	2013	11	53	9	—	KOR: 128,976	Miracles in December
"My Turn to Cry"	2013	9	51	7	—	KOR: 145,820	Miracles in December
"The First Snow" (첫 눈)	2013	1	4	—	153	KOR: 355,698	Miracles in December
"Miracles in December" (Classical Orchestra version)	2013	40	—	—	—	KOR: 42,901	Miracles in December
"The First Snow" (初雪) (Chinese version)	2013	61	—	—	—	KOR: 27,830	Miracles in December
"Christmas Day" (圣诞节) (Chinese version)	2013	64	—	—	—	KOR: 27,075	Miracles in December
"The Star" (星) (Chinese version)	2013	65	—	—	—	KOR: 26,606	Miracles in December
"My Turn to Cry" (爱离开) (Chinese version)	2013	67	—	—	—	KOR: 26,579	Miracles in December
"Moonlight" (월광) (Exo-K)	2014	5	16	16	—	KOR: 236,763	Overdose
"Thunder" (Exo-K)	2014	4	11	5	—	KOR: 282,910	Overdose
"Run" (Exo-K)	2014	7	15	23	—	KOR: 175,111	Overdose
"Love, Love, Love" (Exo-K)	2014	8	21	19	—	KOR: 169,616	Overdose
"Overdose" (上瘾) (Exo-M)	2014	20	—	—	—	KOR: 68,991	Overdose
"Thunder" (雷电) (Exo-M)	2014	26	—	—	—	KOR: 48,059	Overdose
"Moonlight" (月光) (Exo-M)	2014	28	—	—	—	KOR: 45,669	Overdose
"Run" (奔跑) (Exo-M)	2014	29	—	—	—	KOR: 43,905	Overdose
"Love, Love, Love" (梦中梦) (Exo-M)	2014	30	—	—	—	KOR: 42,808	Overdose
"Tell Me What Is Love" (D.O. solo)	2014	44	—	2	—	KOR: 29,668	Exology Chapter 1: The Lost Planet
"Love, Love, Love" (acoustic version)	2014	67	—	—	—	KOR: 20,196	Exology Chapter 1: The Lost Planet
"Beautiful" (Suho solo)	2014	75	—	—	—	KOR: 18,675	Exology Chapter 1: The Lost Planet
"Transformer"	2015	19	—	11	—	KOR: 136,834	Exodus
"What If..". (시선 둘, 시선 하나)	2015	18	—	24	—	KOR: 149,815	Exodus
"My Answer"	2015	14	—	—	—	KOR: 179,471	Exodus
"Exodus"	2015	11	—	8	—	KOR: 246,534	Exodus
"El Dorado"	2015	13	—	7	—	KOR: 173,110	Exodus
"Playboy"	2015	9	—	18	—	KOR: 217,821	Exodus
"Hurt"	2015	23	—	14	—	KOR: 137,781	Exodus
"Lady Luck" (유성우 (流星雨))	2015	26	—	—	—	KOR: 121,701	Exodus
"Beautiful"	2015	22	—	19	—	KOR: 142,329	Exodus
"Call Me Baby" (叫我) (Chinese version)	2015	36	—	—	—	KOR: 80,662	Exodus
"Exodus" (逃脱) (Chinese version)	2015	80	—	—	—	KOR: 28,566	Exodus
"El Dorado" (黄金国) (Chinese version)	2015	77	—	—	—	KOR: 28,488	Exodus
"My Answer" (我的答案) (Chinese version)	2015	84	—	—	—	KOR: 28,155	Exodus
"Playboy" (坏男孩) (Chinese version)	2015	83	—	—	—	KOR: 28,075	Exodus
"Transformer" (变形女) (Chinese version)	2015	87	—	—	—	KOR: 27,254	Exodus
"Beautiful" (美) (Chinese version)	2015	92	—	—	—	KOR: 27,011	Exodus
"What If..". (两个视线, 一个视线) (Chinese version)	2015	90	—	—	—	KOR: 26,852	Exodus
"Hurt" (伤害) (Chinese version)	2015	91	—	—	—	KOR: 26,912	Exodus
"Lady Luck" (流星雨) (Chinese version)	2015	97	—	—	—	KOR: 26,207	Exodus
"Tender Love"	2015	4	—	6	—	KOR: 326,795	Love Me Right
"First Love"	2015	15	—	7	—	KOR: 143,202	Love Me Right
"Promise (Exo 2014)" (약속 (EXO 2014))	2015	12	—	5	—	KOR: 183,856	Love Me Right
"Love Me Right" (漫遊宇宙) (Chinese version)	2015	48	—	—	—	KOR: 69,769	Love Me Right
"Tender Love" (就是爱) (Chinese version)	2015	97	—	—	—	KOR: 26,050	Love Me Right
"Girl x Friend"	2015	16	—	9	—	KOR: 260,574	Sing For You
"On the Snow" (발자국)	2015	18	—	23	—	KOR: 210,483	Sing For You
"Artificial Love"	2016	19	—	5	—	KOR: 174,177	Ex'Act
"Cloud 9"	2016	23	—	9	—	KOR: 140,986	Ex'Act
"Heaven"	2016	16	—	6	—	KOR: 234,231	Ex'Act
"White Noise" (백색소음)	2016	24	—	11	—	KOR: 154,279	Ex'Act
"One and Only" (유리어항)	2016	25	—	12	—	KOR: 136,159	Ex'Act
"They Never Know"	2016	28	—	8	—	KOR: 132,769	Ex'Act
"Stronger"	2016	22	—	13	—	KOR: 140,986	Ex'Act
"Lucky One" (instrumental)	2016	72	—	—	—	KOR: 21,237	Ex'Act
"Monster" (instrumental)	2016	77	—	—	—	KOR: 20,685	Ex'Act
"Monster" (Chinese version)	2016	— (Note: "Monster" (Chinese version) charted at number 1 on the Gaon International Digital Chart.)	—	—	—	KOR: 24,121	Ex'Act
"Lucky One" (Chinese version)	2016	— (Note: "Lucky One" (Chinese version) charted at number 3 on the Gaon International Digital Chart.)	—	—	—	KOR: 23,627	Ex'Act
"Heaven" (Chinese version)	2016	— (Note: "Heaven" (Chinese version) charted at number 5 on the Gaon International Digital Chart.)	—	—	—	KOR: 20,850	Ex'Act
"Artificial Love" (Chinese version)	2016	— (Note: "Artificial Love" (Chinese version) charted at number 6 on the Gaon International Digital Chart.)	—	—	—	KOR: 20,531	Ex'Act
"Cloud 9" (Chinese version)	2016	— (Note: "Cloud 9" (Chinese version) charted at number 7 on the Gaon International Digital Chart.)	—	—	—	KOR: 20,464	Ex'Act
"White Noise" (Chinese version)	2016	— (Note: "White Noise" (Chinese version) charted at number 8 on the Gaon International Digital Chart.)	—	—	—	KOR: 20,583	Ex'Act
"One and Only" (Chinese version)	2016	— (Note: "One and Only" (Chinese version) charted at number 9 on the Gaon International Digital Chart.)	—	—	—	KOR: 20,488	Ex'Act
"They Never Know" (Chinese version)	2016	— (Note: "They Never Know" (Chinese version) charted at number 10 on the Gaon International Digital Chart.)	—	—	—	KOR: 20,392	Ex'Act
"Stronger" (Chinese version)	2016	— (Note: "Stronger" (Chinese version) charted at number 11 on the Gaon International Digital Chart.)	—	—	—	KOR: 20,201	Ex'Act
"She's Dreaming" (꿈)	2016	11	—	5	—	KOR: 138,854	Lotto
"Can't Bring Me Down"	2016	15	—	3	—	KOR: 95,263	Lotto
"Monster (LDN Noise Creeper Bass Remix)"	2016	52	—	—	—	KOR: 39,254	Lotto
"Lotto" (Chinese version)	2016	— (Note: "Lotto" (Chinese version) charted at number 8 on the Gaon International Digital Chart.)	—	—	—	KOR: 10,437	Lotto
"She's Dreaming" (夢) (Chinese version)	2016	— (Note: "She's Dreaming" (Chinese version) charted at number 13 on the Gaon International Digital Chart.-ua)	—	—	—	KOR: 9,211	Lotto
"Can't Bring Me Down" (Chinese version)	2016	— (Note: "Can't Bring Me Down" (Chinese version) charted at number 15 on the Gaon International Digital Chart.-ua)	—	—	—	KOR: 8,811	Lotto
"Monster (LDN Noise Creeper Bass Remix)" (Chinese version)	2016	— (Note: "Monster (LDN Noise Creeper Bass Remix)" (Chinese version) charted at number 28 on the Gaon International Digital Chart.-ua)	—	—	—	KOR: 6,799	Lotto
"Falling for You"	2016	15	—	14	—	KOR: 101,163	For Life
"What I Want for Christmas"	2016	18	—	19	—	KOR: 92,255	For Life
"Twenty Four"	2016	26	—	12	—	KOR: 72,844	For Life
"Winter Heat"	2016	24	—	20	—	KOR: 76,810	For Life
"For Life" (一生一事) (Chinese version)	2016	— (Note: "For Life" (Chinese version) charted at number 34 on the Gaon International Digital Chart.-ua)	—	—	—	KOR: 9,720	For Life
"Falling for You" (亿万分之一的奇迹) (Chinese version)	2016	— (Note: "Falling for You" (Chinese version) charted at number 38 on the Gaon International Digital Chart.-ua)	—	—	—	KOR: 8,971	For Life
"What I Want for Christmas" (再续冬季) (Chinese version)	2016	— (Note: "What I Want for Christmas" (Chinese version) charted at number 39 on the Gaon International Digital Chart.-ua)	—	—	—	KOR: 8,942	For Life
"Twenty Four" (二十四小时) (Chinese version)	2016	— (Note: "Twenty Four" (Chinese version) charted at number 43 on the Gaon International Digital Chart.-ua)	—	—	—	KOR: 8,798	For Life
"Winter Heat" (暖冬) (Chinese version)	2016	— (Note: "Winter Heat" (Chinese version) charted at number 41 on the Gaon International Digital Chart.-ua)	—	—	—	KOR: 8,783	For Life
"The Eve" (전야 (前夜))	2017	9	2	5	—	KOR: 235,171	The War
"What U Do?"	2017	13	3	—	—	KOR: 117,268	The War
"Walk on Memories" (기억을 걷는 밤)	2017	15	4	—	—	KOR: 103,412	The War
"Forever"	2017	16	5	24	—	KOR: 97,969	The War
"Touch It" (너의 손짓)	2017	17	6	—	—	KOR: 95,817	The War
"Diamond" (다이아몬드)	2017	20	7	—	—	KOR: 89,845	The War
"Going Crazy" (내가 미쳐)	2017	23	9	—	—	KOR: 90,427	The War
"Chill" (소름)	2017	24	8	—	—	KOR: 88,885	The War
"Ko Ko Bop" (叩叩趴) (Chinese version)	2017	— (Note: "Ko Ko Bop" (Chinese version) charted at number 8 on the Gaon International Digital Chart.)	—	—	—	KOR: 13,884	The War
"The Eve" (破风) (Chinese version)	2017	— (Note: "The Eve" (Chinese version) charted at number 20 on the Gaon International Digital Chart.-ua)	—	—	—	KOR: 11,669	The War
"What U Do?" (可爱·可恶) (Chinese version)	2017	— (Note: "What U Do?" (Chinese version) charted at number 22 on the Gaon International Digital Chart.-ua)	—	—	—	KOR: 10,949	The War
"Forever" (我加你等于永远) (Chinese version)	2017	— (Note: "Forever" (Chinese version) charted at number 23 on the Gaon International Digital Chart.-ua)	—	—	—	KOR: 10,705	The War
"Diamond" (C乐章) (Chinese version)	2017	— (Note: "Diamond" (Chinese version) charted at number 24 on the Gaon International Digital Chart.-ua)	—	—	—	KOR: 10,760	The War
"Touch It" (指语) (Chinese version)	2017	— (Note: "Touch It" (Chinese version) charted at number 25 on the Gaon International Digital Chart.-ua)	—	—	—	KOR: 10,727	The War
"Walk on Memories" (梦回暮夜) (Chinese version)	2017	— (Note: "Walk on Memories" (Chinese version) charted at number 26 on the Gaon International Digital Chart.-ua)	—	—	—	KOR: 10,776	The War
"Chill" (寒噤) (Chinese version)	2017	— (Note: "Chill" (Chinese version) charted at number 27 on the Gaon International Digital Chart.-ua)	—	—	—	KOR: 10,621	The War
"Going Crazy" (疯语者) (Chinese version)	2017	— (Note: "Going Crazy" (Chinese version) charted at number 28 on the Gaon International Digital Chart.-ua)	—	—	—	KOR: 10,644	The War
"Sweet Lies"	2017	22	2	5	—	KOR: 83,841	The War: The Power of Music
"Boomerang" (부메랑)	2017	28	4	11	—	KOR: 78,062	The War: The Power of Music
"Been Through" (지나갈 테니)	2017	19	2	—	—	KOR: 55,901	Universe
"Stay"	2017	24	3	—	—	KOR: 49,734	Universe
"Fall"	2017	30	4	—	—	KOR: 45,499	Universe
"Good Night"	2017	31	5	—	—	KOR: 44,917	Universe
"Lights Out"	2017	36	6	—	—	KOR: 43,932	Universe
"Universe" (CD version)	2017	—	7	—	—	—N/a	Universe
"Ooh La La La" (닿은 순간)	2018	43	2	12	—	—N/a	Don't Mess Up My Tempo
"Gravity"	2018	39	3	21	—	—N/a	Don't Mess Up My Tempo
"Sign"	2018	59	4	—	—	—N/a	Don't Mess Up My Tempo
"24/7"	2018	53	5	—	—	—N/a	Don't Mess Up My Tempo
"With You" (가끔)	2018	71	6	—	—	—N/a	Don't Mess Up My Tempo
"Smile On My Face" (여기 있을게)	2018	74	7	—	—	—N/a	Don't Mess Up My Tempo
"Bad Dream" (후폭풍)	2018	79	8	—	—	—N/a	Don't Mess Up My Tempo
"Oasis" (오아시스)	2018	78	9	19	—	—N/a	Don't Mess Up My Tempo
"Damage"	2018	85	10	—	—	—N/a	Don't Mess Up My Tempo
"Trauma" (트라우마)	2018	58	2	8	—	—N/a	Love Shot
"Wait"	2018	65	3	14	—	—N/a	Love Shot
"Trouble"	2019	85	37	19	—	—N/a	Obsession
"Jekyll" (지킬)	2019	96	46	22	—	—N/a	Obsession
"Groove" (춤)	2019	93	43	—	—	—N/a	Obsession
"Ya Ya Ya"	2019	104	49	—	—	—N/a	Obsession
"Baby You Are"	2019	106	50	—	—	—N/a	Obsession
"Non Stop"	2019	111	52	—	—	—N/a	Obsession
"Day After Day" (오늘도)	2019	109	51	—	—	—N/a	Obsession
"Butterfly Effect" (나비효과)	2019	98	44	—	—	—N/a	Obsession
"Obsession" (嗜) (Chinese version)	2019	171	64	—	—	—N/a	Obsession
"Paradise" (파라다이스)	2021	106	—	—	—	—N/a	Don't Fight the Feeling
"No Matter" (훅!)	2021	121	—	—	—	—N/a	Don't Fight the Feeling
"Runaway"	2021	126	—	—	—	—N/a	Don't Fight the Feeling
"Just as Usual" (지켜줄게)	2021	117	—	—	—	—N/a	Don't Fight the Feeling
"Regret It"	2023	183	—	—	—	—N/a	Exist
"Cinderella"	2023	175	—	—	—	—N/a	Exist
"Love Fool"	2023	197	—	—	—	—N/a	Exist
"Git It Up! "	2025	— (Note: "Git It Up! " did not enter the Circle Digital Chart; it peaked at number 162 on the component Download Chart.)	—	—	—	—N/a	2025 SM Town: The Culture, the Future
"Back It Up"	2026	142	46	—	—	—N/a	Reverxe
"Crazy"	2026	— (Note: "Crazy" did not enter the Circle Digital Chart; it peaked at number 17 on the component Download Chart.)	—	—	—	—N/a	Reverxe
"Suffocate"	2026	— (Note: "Suffocate" did not enter the Circle Digital Chart; it peaked at number 16 on the component Download Chart.)	—	—	—	—N/a	Reverxe
"Moonlight Shadows"	2026	— (Note: "Moonlight Shadow" did not enter the Circle Digital Chart; it peaked at number 13 on the component Download Chart.)	91	—	—	—N/a	Reverxe
"Back Pocket"	2026	— (Note: "Back Pocket" did not enter the Circle Digital Chart; it peaked at number 14 on the component Download Chart.)	—	—	—	—N/a	Reverxe
"Touch & Go"	2026	— (Note: "Touch & Go" did not enter the Circle Digital Chart; it peaked at number 18 on the component Download Chart.)	—	—	—	—N/a	Reverxe
"Flatline"	2026	— (Note: "Flatline" did not enter the Circle Digital Chart; it peaked at number 15 on the component Download Chart.)	98	—	—	—N/a	Reverxe
"I'm Home"	2026	— (Note: "I'm Home" did not enter the Circle Digital Chart; it peaked at number 10 on the component Download Chart.)	57	—	—	—N/a	Reverxe
"—" denotes releases that did not chart or were not released in that region.

=== Other charted Japanese songs ===
List of other charted Japanese songs, with selected peak chart positions
Title	Year	Peak chart positions	Sales	Album
Title	Year	KOR Int.	Sales	Album
"Drop That"	2015	5	KOR: 15,333	Countdown
"TacTix"	2016	23	KOR: 8,016	Countdown
"Run This"	2016	25	KOR: 7,897	Countdown

== Soundtrack appearances ==
Note: For individual member's soundtrack appearances, see their articles.

List of Exo soundtrack appearances
Title	Year	Album
"Dear My Family"	2012	I Am OST
"Lovin' You Mo"	2018	Spring Has Come OST and Countdown

== Music videos ==
List of Exo music videos released
Title	Artist	Year
"What Is Love"	Exo-K and Exo-M	2012
"History"	Exo-K and Exo-M	2012
"Mama"	Exo-K and Exo-M	2012
"Wolf"	Exo	2013
"Music Video Drama Episode 1"	Exo	2013
"Music Video Drama Episode 2"	Exo	2013
"Growl"	Exo	2013
"Growl Music Video 2nd Version"	Exo	2013
"Miracles in December"	Exo	2013
"Overdose"	Exo-K and Exo-M	2014
"Call Me Baby"	Exo	2015
"Love Me Right"	Exo	2015
"Lightsaber"	Exo	2015
"Sing for You"	Exo	2015
"Lucky One"	Exo	2016
"Monster"	Exo	2016
"Lotto"	Exo	2016
"Dancing King" (with Yoo Jae-suk)	Exo	2016
"Coming Over"	Exo	2016
"For Life"	Exo	2016
"Ko Ko Bop"	Exo	2017
"Power"	Exo	2017
"Universe"	Exo	2017
"Electric Kiss"	Exo	2018
"Tempo"	Exo	2018
"Love Shot"	Exo	2018
"Obsession"	Exo	2019
"Don't Fight the Feeling"	Exo	2021
"Let Me In"	Exo	2023
"Hear Me Out"	Exo	2023
"Cream Soda"	Exo	2023
"I'm Home"	Exo	2025
"Crown"	Exo	2026

== See also ==
- List of songs recorded by Exo
- Exo-CBX discography
- Exo-SC discography
- Lay Zhang discography
- Chen discography
- Baekhyun discography
