= Exo videography =

Videography of South Korean-Chinese boy band Exo

Exo is a South Korean-Chinese boy band produced by SM Entertainment. Initially separated into subgroups Exo-K and Exo-M, respectively performing music in Korean and Mandarin, the band debuted on April 8, 2012 with the single, "Mama". Prior to debut, various members of the band had modeled in music videos performed by senior SM Entertainment artists.

The band has released fifteen albums since their debut (not including repackaged albums), the EPs Mama, Miracles in December, Sing for You, Overdose, For Life, Universe, Don't Fight the Feeling, and the studio albums XOXO, Exodus, Ex'Act, The War, Countdown, Don't Mess Up My Tempo, Obsession, and Exist.

== Music videos ==
Title	Year	Other performer(s) credited	Director(s) and studio(s)	Description	Ref.
"What Is Love"	2012	D.O., Baekhyun		First Prologue single, Korean version	
"What Is Love"	2012	Chen, Luhan		Mandarin version	
"History"	2012	Exo-K		Second Prologue single, Korean version	
"History"	2012	Exo-M		Mandarin version	
"Mama"	2012	Exo-K		Debut single, Korean version	
"Mama"	2012	Exo-M		Mandarin version	
"Wolf"	2013	—N/a		First comeback single as one group, Korean version	
"Wolf"	2013	—N/a		Mandarin version	
"Music Video Drama Episode 1"	2013	—N/a		Drama Music Video featuring songs from XOXO, Korean version	
"Music Video Drama episode 1"	2013	—N/a		Mandarin version	
"Growl"	2013	—N/a	Cho Soo-hyun	Korean version, follow-up single	
"Growl"	2013	—N/a	Cho Soo-hyun	Mandarin version	
"Growl Music Video 2nd Version"	2013	—N/a		Korean version	
"Growl Music Video 2nd Version"	2013	—N/a		Mandarin version	
"Music Video Drama Episode 2"	2013	—N/a		Drama Music Video featuring songs from XOXO, Korean version	
"Music Video Drama Episode 2"	2013	—N/a		Mandarin version	
"Miracles in December"	2013	D.O, Chen, Baekhyun	Cho Soo-hyun	Special single, Korean version	
"Miracles in December"	2013	Luhan, Chen, Baekhyun	Cho Soo-hyun	Mandarin version	
"Overdose"	2014	—N/a	Hong Won-ki (Zanybros)	Korean version	
"Overdose"	2014	—N/a	Hong Won-ki (Zanybros)	Mandarin version	
"Call Me Baby"	2015	—N/a	Beomjin (VM Project Architecture)	Korean version	
"Call Me Baby"	2015	—N/a	Beomjin (VM Project Architecture)	Mandarin version	
"Love Me Right"	2015	—N/a	Beomjin (VM Project Architecture)	Korean version	
"Love Me Right"	2015	—N/a	Beomjin (VM Project Architecture)	Mandarin version	
"Love Me Right ~romantic universe~"	2015	—N/a		Japanese debut single	
"Lightsaber"	2015	—N/a		EXO and Star Wars collaboration single, Korean version	
"Lightsaber"	2015	—N/a		Mandarin version	
"Lightsaber"	2015	—N/a		Japanese version	
"Sing For You"	2015	—N/a		Korean version	
"Sing For You"	2015	—N/a		Mandarin version	
"Lucky One"	2016	—N/a	Shin Hee-won	Korean version	
"Lucky One"	2016	—N/a	Shin Hee-won	Mandarin version	
"Monster"	2016	—N/a		Korean version	
"Monster"	2016	—N/a		Mandarin version	
"Lotto"	2016	—N/a	Shin Hee-won	Korean version	
"Lotto"	2016	—N/a	Shin Hee-won	Mandarin version	
"Dancing King"	2016	Yoo Jae-suk		collaboration single through SM Station	
"Coming Over"	2016	—N/a		Japanese comeback single	
"For Life"	2016	—N/a	Kim Sung-ho	Korean version	
"Yīshēng Yīshì (For Life)"	2016	—N/a		Mandarin version	
"Ko Ko Bop"	2017	—N/a		Korean version	
"Kòu kòu pā (Ko Ko Bop)"	2017	—N/a		Mandarin version	
"Power"	2017	—N/a	Meltmirror	Korean version	
"Chāo yīn lì (Power)"	2017	—N/a	Meltmirror	Mandarin version	
"Universe"	2017	—N/a		Korean version	
"Wèi Xīn Dǎoháng (Universe)"	2017	—N/a		Mandarin version	
"Electric Kiss"	2017	—N/a		Japanese comeback single	
"Tempo"	2018	—N/a	Daniel Jon	Korean version	
"Jiézòu (Tempo)"	2018	—N/a	Daniel Jon	Mandarin version	
"Love Shot"	2018	—N/a		Korean version	
"Xuāngào (Love Shot)"	2018	—N/a		Mandarin version	
"Obsession"	2019	—N/a			
"Don't Fight the Feeling"	2021	—N/a			
"Let Me In"	2023	—N/a			
"Hear Me Out"	2023	—N/a			
"Cream Soda"	2023	—N/a			
"I'm Home"	2025	—N/a			
"Crown"	2026	—N/a			

== Video albums ==
=== DVDs ===
Title	Album details	Peak chart positions		Sales
Title	Album details	JPN		Sales
Title	Album details	DVD	Blu-ray	Sales
Exo's First Box	Released: March 27, 2014; Languages: Korean, English, Chinese; Running Time: 2 hours and 59 min; Label: SM Entertainment	—	—	KOR: 71,154
Exo from Exoplanet #1 – The Lost Planet in Japan	Released: March 18, 2015; Languages: Korean, Japanese, Chinese; Running Time: 2 hours and 41 min; Editions: Standard, Deluxe; Label: Avex Trax	2	1	JPN: 49,100
Exo from Exoplanet #1 – The Lost Planet in Seoul	Released: June 30, 2015; Languages: Korean, Japanese, Chinese; Running Time: 2 hours and 45 min; Label: SM Entertainment	—	—	—N/a
Exo's Second Box	Released: October 30, 2015; Languages: Korean, Chinese, English; Running Time: 4 hours and 13 min; Label: SM Entertainment	—	—	—N/a
Exo from Exoplanet #2 – The Exo'luxion In Seoul	Released: Feb 29, 2016; Languages: Korean, Japanese, Chinese; Running Time: 2 hours and 20 min; Label: SM Entertainment	—	—	—N/a
Exo from Exoplanet #2 – The Exo'luxion In Japan	Released: March 9, 2016; Languages: Japanese; Label: Avex Trax	1	1	JPN: 43,222
Exo from Exoplanet #3 – The Exo'rdium In Japan	Released: March 8, 2017; Languages: Japanese; Label: Avex Trax	1	1	JPN: 35,059
Exo from Exoplanet #3 - The Exo'rdium in Seoul	Released: October 2, 2017; Languages: Korean; Label: SM Entertainment	—	—	—N/a
From Happiness	Released: December 7, 2017; Languages: Korean; Label: SM Entertainment	—	—	—N/a
Exo Planet #4 – The Elyxion – in Japan	Released: July 4, 2018; Languages: Japanese; Label: Avex Trax	4	2	JPN: 27,191
Exo Planet #4 – The Elyxion – in Seoul	Released: August 22, 2018; Languages: Korean, Japanese, Chinese; Label: SM Entertainment	—	—	—N/a
Exo Planet #5 – The Exploration – in Japan	Released: February 26, 2020; Languages: Korean, Japanese; Label: SM Entertainment	4	6	—N/a
Exo Film Live Japan Tour – Exo Planet 2021	Released: February 22, 2022; Languages: Korean, Japanese; Label: SM Entertainment	3	3	—N/a
EXO-L-JAPAN presents EXO CHANNEL “THE BEST”	Released: July 19, 2023; Languages: Japanese; Label: Avex Trax	—	—	—N/a
"—" denotes releases that did not chart or were not released in that region.

== Filmography ==
=== Film ===
Year	Title	Role
2015	SMTown: The Stage	Themselves

=== Drama ===
Year	Title	Role	Network	Note
2012	To the Beautiful You	Party Performers	SBS	Exo-K Cameo in Episode 2
2015	Exo Next Door	Themselves	LINE TV	Baekhyun, Chanyeol, D.O., Sehun as protagonists, other members cameo

=== Reality shows ===
Year	Title	Network	Note	Ref.
2013	Midsummer Night's Growl	Naver Starcast		
2013	Exo's Showtime	MBC Every 1		
2014	Hot Moment XOXO	Mnet		
2014	Exo 90:2014	Mnet		
2015	Exo Channel	Tokyo TV		
2015	Exocast #OnAir	Naver Starcast	Lay and Tao were absent	
2015	Surplines Exo	Line TV	Chanyeol, Sehun, Kai, Xiumin, Tao	
2016	Exomentary Live	Vlive+	15 episodes	
2017	Exo Tourgram	Vlive+	30 episodes, Lay was absent	
2017	Midsummer Night's Kokobop	Vlive	Lay was absent	
2017	Mukbang Exo	Vlive	Chanyeol, Baekhyun, D.O, Sehun	
2018	Exo's Travel the World, Through a Ladder of Fortune	oksusu, XtvN	Exo-CBX version (Season 1)	
2018	Exo Arcade	Vlive	Lay was absent (Season 1)	
2019	Exo's Travel the World, Through a Ladder of Fortune	oksusu, XtvN	Exo version, Lay was absent (Season 2)	
2019	Heart 4 U	Vlive		
2021	Exo Arcade	YouTube	Suho, Lay, Chen were absent (Season 2)	
2022	Exo's Travel the World, Through a Ladder of Fortune	Wavve, Beyond LIVE	Baekhyun, Chanyeol, Chen, Lay were absent (Season 3)	
