= Exo Planet 4 - The Elyxion (dot) =

Exo Planet #4 - The Elyxion [dot]
- Digital cover

Live album by Exo
- Released: January 30, 2019
- Recorded: 2018
- Studio: Doobdoob (Seoul); Iconic (Seoul); In Grid (Seoul); SM Blue Cup (Seoul); SM Blue Ocean (Seoul); SM LVYIN (Seoul); Sound POOL (Seoul)
- Genre: K-pop
- Length: 125:08
- Language: Korean; English
- Label: SM; Dreamus

Exo chronology
Love Shot (2018)	Exo Planet #4 - The Elyxion [dot] (2019)	Obsession (2019)

Exo Planet #4 - The Elyxion [dot] (stylized as EXO PLANET #4 - The EℓyXiOn [dot]) is the third live album by South Korean–Chinese boy band Exo. It was released on January 30, 2019, by SM Entertainment and distributed by Iriver.

== Track listing ==
CD1
No.	Title	Length
1.	"The Eve" (전야 (前夜))	2:15
2.	"Forever"	3:54
3.	"Ko Ko Bop"	3:23
4.	"Growl" (으르렁)	3:54
5.	"I See You" (Kai's solo)	3:23
6.	"Call Me Baby"	4:59
7.	"Touch It" (너의 손짓)	3:37
8.	"Chill" (소름)	3:09
9.	"For Life" (English Version (D.O.'s solo))	3:34
10.	"Going Crazy" (내가 미쳐)	4:17
11.	"Sweet Lies"	3:57
12.	"Boomerang" (부메랑)	2:57
13.	"Lotto"	3:21
14.	"Ka-Ching!" (Korean Version by Exo-CBX)	2:49
15.	"Sing for You"	4:34
16.	"Playboy" (Suho's solo)	2:23
17.	"Psycho" (Baekhyun's solo)	2:28
Total length:		58:54

CD2
No.	Title	Length
1.	"Heaven"	3:43
2.	"What U Do?"	3:40
3.	"Lucky One"	3:45
4.	"Tender Love"	3:35
5.	"3.6.5"	3:05
6.	"Walk on Memories" (기억을 걷는 밤)	4:49
7.	"Moonlight" (월광)	4:43
8.	"We Young" (Sung by Chanyeol and Sehun)	3:45
9.	"Electric Kiss"	4:00
10.	"Coming Over" (Korean Version)	2:43
11.	"Run This" (Korean Version)	2:02
12.	"Drop That" (Korean Version)	2:50
13.	"Power"	6:27
14.	"Beyond" (Xiumin's solo)	2:56
15.	"Years" (Korean Version (Chen's solo))	1:43
16.	"Lucky"	3:16
17.	"Run"	4:47
18.	"Universe"	4:25
Total length:		1:06:14

== Chart ==
Chart (2019)	Peak position
Japanese Albums (Oricon)	90

== Sales ==
Region	Sales
Japan (Oricon)	655

== Release history ==
Release history for Exo Planet #4 - The Elyxion [dot]
Region	Date	Format	Label
South Korea	January 30, 2019	CD; DVD	SM; Dreamus
Various	January 30, 2019	Digital download; streaming	SM

== See also ==
- Exo Planet 4 – The Elyxion
