= Exo Planet 4 – The Elyxion =

2017–18 concert tour by Exo

Exo Planet #4 – "The Elyxion"
- world tour by Exo
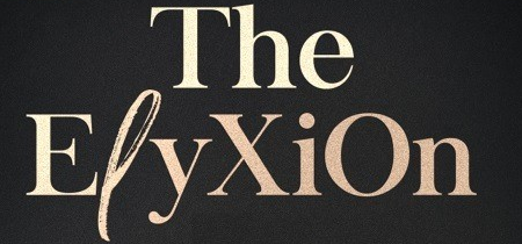
- Associated album: The War; The War: The Power of Music; Countdown
- Start date: November 24, 2017
- End date: August 11, 2018
- No. of shows: 25
- Website: exo.smtown.com

Exo concert chronology
- Exo Planet #3 – The Exo'rdium (2016–17); Exo Planet #4 – The Elyxion (2017–18); Exo Planet #5 – EXplOration (2019)

Exo Planet #4 – The Elyxion (stylized as EXO PLANET #4 – The EℓyXiOn) was the fourth tour of South Korean-Chinese boy band Exo. The tour was officially announced on October 19, 2017, and began in Seoul's Gocheok Sky Dome on November 24, 2017.

Exo announced the encore of this tour (The Elyxion [dot]) in two cities: Seoul, South Korea from July 13 to 15 and Macau on August 10 and 11.

== Concerts ==
=== Seoul ===
- The announcement of the tour was made officially by SM Entertainment in October 2017, starting with three dates in the Gocheok Sky Dome on November 24–26, 2017.
- It was reported that the server of Yes24, one of the official ticketing partners, crashed due to massive site traffic coming in all at once, breaking their own record of ticket selling in 0.2 seconds.
- In addition to being the first artist to perform in Gocheok Sky Dome, on October 10, 2015, Exo became the first artist to perform there on three consecutive days, recording the highest attendance since its opening with over 66,000 fans.

=== Japan ===
- During the Fukuoka (Day 1) show, Suho did not perform his "Playboy" solo stage in honor of the passing of labelmate Jonghyun who wrote the song.
- Exo added their new songs "Electric Kiss" and "Cosmic Railway" to the set list for their performances in Saitama and Osaka.

=== Bangkok ===
- The tour in Bangkok sold out all three shows with 33,000 tickets in less than five minutes.

== Set list ==
Seoul, South Korea

Opening VCR

- Intro.
- The Eve (Remix)
- Forever (+ Kai Dance Break)
- Ko Ko Bop
- Growl (Remix)
- Xiumin & Baekhyun Solo Stage (Battle Scene)

VCR #2

- I See You (Kai Solo Stage)

VCR #3

- Call Me Baby (Remix)
- Touch It (+ Kai Dance Break)
- Chill
- For Life (English ver.) (Chanyeol & D.O.)
- Sweet Lies

Ment

- Boomerang
- Lotto
- Ka-Ching! (Korean Ver.)
- Sing for You (Jazz ver.)
- Playboy (Suho solo stage)

VCR #4

- Hands (Chanyeol Solo Stage)

VCR #5

- Cloud 9
- What U Do
- Lucky One
- Tender Love

Ment

- Walk On Memories
- Heaven (Chen solo stage)

VCR #6

- GO (Sehun Solo Stage)
- Diamond
- Coming Over (Korean Ver.)
- Run This (Korean Ver.)
- Drop That (Korean Ver.)
- Power (Remix)

Instrumental Song (Random)

- Monster
- Don't Go

Ending Ment

- Into Your World
Japan

Opening VCR

- Intro
- The Eve (Remix)
- Forever (+ Kai Dance Break)
- Ko Ko Bop
- Growl (Remix)
- Xiumin & Baekhyun Solo Stage (Battle Scene)

VCR #2

- I See You (Kai Solo Stage)

VCR #3

- Call Me Baby (Remix)
- Touch It (+ Kai Dance Break)
- Chill
- For Life (English ver.) (Chanyeol & D.O.)
- Sweet Lies

Ment

- Boomerang
- Lotto
- Ka-Ching! (Japanese ver.)
- Sing for You (Jazz ver.)
- Playboy (Suho solo stage) (Minus D1 in Fukuoka)

VCR #4

- Hands (Chanyeol Solo Stage)

VCR #5

- Cloud 9
- What U Do
- Lucky One
- Tender Love

Ment

- Cosmic Railway (in Saitama and Osaka)
- Walk On Memories
- Heaven (Chen solo stage)

VCR #6

- GO (Sehun Solo Stage)
- Diamond / Electric Kiss (in Saitama and Osaka)
- Coming Over (Japanese ver.)
- Run This (Japanese ver.)
- Drop That (Japanese ver.)
- Power (Remix)

Instrumental Song (Sing For You)

- Monster
- Don't Go
- The First Snow (Only D3 in Fukuoka)

Ending Ment

- Into Your World
Taipei, Taiwan

Opening VCR

- Intro
- The Eve (Remix)
- Forever
- Ko Ko Bop
- Growl (Remix)
- Xiumin & Baekhyun Solo Stage (Battle Scene)

VCR #2

- I See You (Kai Solo Stage)

VCR #3

- Call Me Baby (Remix)
- Touch It (+ Kai Dance Break)
- Chill
- For Life (English ver.) (Chanyeol & D.O.)
- Sweet Lies

Ment

- Boomerang
- Lotto
- Ka-Ching! (Korean Ver.)
- Sing for You (Jazz ver.)
- Playboy (Suho solo stage)

VCR #4

- Hands (Chanyeol Solo Stage)

VCR #5

- Cloud 9
- What U Do
- Lucky One
- Tender Love

Ment

- Walk On Memories
- Heaven (Chen solo stage)

VCR #6

- GO (Sehun Solo Stage)
- Diamond
- Coming Over (Korean Ver.)
- Run This (Korean Ver.)
- Drop That (Korean Ver.)
- Power (Remix)

Instrumental Song (For Life)

- Don't Go

Ending Ment

- Into Your World
Singapore

Opening VCR

- Intro
- The Eve (Remix)
- Forever (+ Kai Dance Break)
- Ko Ko Bop
- Growl (Remix)
- Xiumin & Baekhyun Solo Stage (Battle Scene)

VCR #2

- I See You (Kai Solo Stage)

VCR #3

- Call Me Baby (Remix)
- Touch It (+ Kai Dance Break)
- Chill
- For Life (English ver.) (Chanyeol & D.O.)
- Sweet Lies

Ment

- Boomerang
- Lotto
- Ka-Ching! (Korean Ver.)
- Sing for You (Jazz ver.)
- Playboy (Suho solo stage)

VCR #4

- Hands (Chanyeol Solo Stage)

VCR #5

- Cloud 9
- What U Do
- Tender Love

Ment

- Walk On Memories
- Heaven (Chen solo stage)

VCR #6

- GO (Sehun Solo Stage)
- Diamond
- Coming Over (Korean Ver.)
- Run This (Korean Ver.)
- Drop That (Korean Ver.)
- Power (Remix)

Instrumental Song (For Life)

- Don't Go

Ending Ment

- Into Your World
Bangkok, Thailand

Opening VCR

- Intro
- The Eve (Remix)
- Forever
- Ko Ko Bop
- Growl (Remix)
- Xiumin & Baekhyun solo stage (Battle Scene)

VCR #2

- I See You (Kai solo stage)

VCR #3

- Call Me Baby (Remix)
- Touch It (+ Kai Dance Break)
- Chill
- For Life (English ver.) (Chanyeol & D.O.)
- Sweet Lies

Ment

- Boomerang
- Lotto
- Ka-Ching! (Korean ver.)
- Sing For You (Jazz ver.)
- Playboy (Suho solo stage)

VCR #4

- Hands (Chanyeol solo stage)

VCR #5

- Cloud 9
- What U Do
- Lucky One
- Tender Love

Ment

- Walk On Memories
- Heaven (Chen solo stage)

VCR #6

- GO (Sehun solo stage)
- Diamond
- Coming Over (Korean ver.)
- Run This (Korean ver.)
- Drop That (Korean Ver.)
- Power (Remix)

Instrumental Song (For Life)

- Don't Go

Ending Ment

- Into Your World
Manila, Philippines

Opening VCR

- Intro
- The Eve (Remix)
- Forever
- Ko Ko Bop
- Growl (Remix)
- Xiumin & Baekhyun solo stage (Battle Scene)

VCR #2

- I See You (Kai solo stage)

VCR #3

- Call Me Baby (Remix)
- Touch It (+ Kai Dance Break)
- Chill
- For Life (English ver.) (Chanyeol & D.O.)
- Sweet Lies

Ment

- Boomerang
- Lotto
- Ka-Ching! (Korean ver.)
- Sing For You (Jazz ver.)
- Playboy (Suho solo stage)

VCR #4

- Hands (Chanyeol solo stage)

VCR #5

- Cloud 9
- What U Do
- Lucky One
- Tender Love

Ment

- Walk On Memories
- Heaven (Chen solo stage)

VCR #6

- GO (Sehun solo stage)
- Diamond
- Coming Over (Korean ver.)
- Run This (Korean ver.)
- Drop That (Korean Ver.)
- Power (Remix)

Instrumental Song (For Life)

- Don't Go

Ending Ment

- Into Your World
Hong Kong

Opening VCR

- Intro
- The Eve (Remix)
- Forever
- Ko Ko Bop
- Growl (Remix)
- Xiumin & Baekhyun solo stage (Battle Scene)

VCR #2

- I See You (Kai solo stage)

VCR #3

- Call Me Baby (Remix)
- Touch It (+ Kai Dance Break)
- Chill
- For Life (English ver.) (Chanyeol & D.O.)
- Sweet Lies

Ment

- Boomerang
- Lotto
- Ka-Ching! (Korean ver.)
- Sing For You (Jazz ver.)
- Playboy (Suho solo stage)

VCR #4

- Hands (Chanyeol solo stage)

VCR #5

- Cloud 9
- What U Do
- Tender Love

Ment

- Walk On Memories
- Heaven (Chen solo stage)

VCR #6

- GO (Sehun solo stage)
- Diamond
- Coming Over (Korean ver.)
- Run This (Korean ver.)
- Drop That (Korean Ver.)
- Power (Remix)

Instrumental Song (For Life)

- Don't Go

Ending Ment

- Into Your World
Kuala Lumpur, Malaysia

Opening VCR

- Intro
- The Eve (Remix)
- Forever
- Ko Ko Bop
- Growl (Remix)
- Xiumin & Baekhyun solo stage (Battle Scene)

VCR #2

- I See You (Kai solo stage)

VCR #3

- Call Me Baby (Remix)
- Touch It (+ Kai Dance Break)
- Chill
- For Life (English ver.) (Chanyeol & D.O.)
- Sweet Lies

Ment

- Boomerang
- Lotto
- Ka-Ching! (Korean ver.)
- Sing For You (Jazz ver.)
- Playboy (Suho solo stage)

VCR #4

- Hands (Chanyeol solo stage)

VCR #5

- Cloud 9
- What U Do
- Tender Love

Ment

- Walk On Memories
- Heaven (Chen solo stage)

VCR #6

- GO (Sehun solo stage)
- Diamond
- Coming Over (Korean ver.)
- Run This (Korean ver.)
- Drop That (Korean Ver.)
- Power (Remix)

Instrumental Song (For Life)

- Don't Go

Ending Ment

- Into Your World
Seoul, South Korea (Encore Show)

Opening VCR

- Intro.
- The Eve (Remix)
- Forever (+ Kai Dance Break)
- Ko Ko Bop
- Growl (Remix)
- JMT (Sehun Solo Stage)

VCR #2

- I See You (Kai Solo Stage)

VCR #3

- Call Me Baby (Remix)
- Touch It (+ Kai Dance Break)
- Chill
- For Life (English ver.) (Chanyeol & D.O.)
- Going Crazy
- Sweet Lies

Ment

- Boomerang
- Lotto
- Ka-Ching! (Korean ver.)
- Sing for You (Jazz ver.)
- Playboy (Suho Solo Stage)

VCR #4

- Psycho (Baekhyun Solo Stage)

VCR #5

- Heaven
- What U Do
- Lucky One
- Tender Love
- 3.6.5

Ment

- Walk On Memories
- Moonlight (Suho, Baekhyun, Chen, D.O.)

VCR #6

- We Young (Chanyeol & Sehun)
- Electric Kiss
- Coming Over (Korean ver.)
- Run This (Korean ver.)
- Drop That (Korean ver.)
- Power (Remix)

Fanchanting + Bloopers VCR

- Beyond (Xiumin Solo Stage)
- Years (Chen Solo Stage)
- Lucky
- Run

Ending Ment

- Universe
Macau (Encore Show)

Opening VCR

- Intro.
- The Eve (Remix)
- Forever (+ Kai Dance Break)
- Ko Ko Bop
- Growl (Remix)
- JMT (Sehun Solo Stage)

VCR #2

- I See You (Kai Solo Stage)

VCR #3

- Call Me Baby (Remix)
- Touch It (+ Kai Dance Break)
- Chill
- For Life (English ver.) (Chanyeol & D.O.)
- Going Crazy
- Sweet Lies

Ment

- Boomerang
- Lotto
- Ka-Ching! (Korean ver.)
- Sing for You (Jazz ver.)
- Playboy (Suho Solo Stage)

VCR #4

- Psycho (Baekhyun Solo Stage)

VCR #5

- Heaven
- Tender Love
- 3.6.5

Ment

- Walk On Memories
- Moonlight (Suho, Baekhyun, Chen, D.O.)

VCR #6

- We Young (Chanyeol & Sehun)
- Coming Over (Korean ver.)
- Run This (Korean ver.)
- Drop That (Korean ver.)
- Power (Remix)

Fanchanting + Bloopers VCR

- Beyond (Xiumin Solo Stage)
- Years (Chen Solo Stage)
- Lucky
- Run

Ending Ment

- Universe

== Tour dates ==
Date	City	Country	Venue	Attendance
November 24, 2017	Seoul	South Korea	Gocheok Sky Dome	66,000
November 25, 2017	Seoul	South Korea	Gocheok Sky Dome	66,000
November 26, 2017	Seoul	South Korea	Gocheok Sky Dome	66,000
December 22, 2017	Fukuoka	Japan	Fukuoka Convention Center	150,000 (Note: The score data is combined from the shows held in Japan from 22, 23, December 24, 2017, 27, January 28 & 23, February 24, 2018, respectively.)
December 23, 2017	Fukuoka	Japan	Fukuoka Convention Center	150,000
December 24, 2017	Fukuoka	Japan	Fukuoka Convention Center	150,000
January 27, 2018	Saitama	Japan	Saitama Super Arena	150,000
January 28, 2018	Saitama	Japan	Saitama Super Arena	150,000
February 10, 2018	Taipei	Taiwan	Taipei Arena	22,000
February 11, 2018	Taipei	Taiwan	Taipei Arena	22,000
February 23, 2018	Osaka	Japan	Kyocera Dome	
February 24, 2018	Osaka	Japan	Kyocera Dome	
March 3, 2018	Singapore		Singapore Indoor Stadium	8,000
March 16, 2018	Bangkok	Thailand	Impact Arena	33,000
March 17, 2018	Bangkok	Thailand	Impact Arena	33,000
March 18, 2018	Bangkok	Thailand	Impact Arena	33,000
April 28, 2018	Pasay	Philippines	SM Mall of Asia Arena	10,000
June 2, 2018	Hong Kong	China	AsiaWorld–Expo	20,000
June 3, 2018	Hong Kong	China	AsiaWorld–Expo	20,000
July 7, 2018	Kuala Lumpur	Malaysia	Axiata Arena	10,000
July 13, 2018	Seoul	South Korea	Gocheok Sky Dome	66,000
July 14, 2018	Seoul	South Korea	Gocheok Sky Dome	66,000
July 15, 2018	Seoul	South Korea	Gocheok Sky Dome	66,000
August 10, 2018	Macau	China	Cotai Arena	20,000
August 11, 2018	Macau	China	Cotai Arena	20,000
Total				405,000

== Television broadcasts ==
Television premiere date, country of broadcast, title of program, date filmed, and location filmed
Premiere date	Country	Channel	Program title	Recording date	Recording location	Ref.
March 31, 2018	Japan	Wowow	Exo Planet #4 – The Elyxion – in Japan	January 27–28, 2018	Various in Japan	

== Box office score data ==
Venue	City	Tickets sold / available	Gross revenue
Taipei Arena	Taipei, Taiwan	22,000 / 22,000 (100%)	NT$82,000,000; US$2,796,716.25

== See also ==
- Exo Planet 4 - The Elyxion (dot)
