= Exo Planet 3 – The Exo'rdium (dot) =

EXO PLANET #3-The EXO'rDIUM[dot]
- Digital cover

Live album by Exo
- Released: October 25, 2017
- Recorded: May 27–28, 2017
- Venue: Seoul Olympic Stadium
- Genre: K-pop
- Length: 108:36
- Languages: Korean; English
- Labels: SM; iRiver

Exo chronology
The War: The Power of Music (2017)	EXO PLANET #3-The EXO'rDIUM[dot] (2017)	Universe (2017)

Singles from EXO PLANET #3-The EXO'rDIUM[dot]
- 1. "Together (같이해)" Released: October 25, 2017

Exo Planet 3 – The Exo'rdium (dot) (stylized as EXO PLANET #3 - The EXO'rDIUM[dot]) is the second live album by South Korean–Chinese boy band Exo. It was released on October 25, 2017, by SM Entertainment and distributed by IRIVER. The album contains 2 CDs and a total of 29 songs.

== Track listing ==
Disc 1
No.	Title	Length
1.	"MAMA"	2:17
2.	"Monster"	3:51
3.	"Wolf" (늑대와 미녀)	6:15
4.	"White Noise" (백색소음)	3:50
5.	"Thunder"	2:42
6.	"Playboy"	2:19
7.	"Artificial Love"	5:01
8.	"Unfair" (불공평해)	3:32
9.	"My Lady"	1:02
10.	"Moonlight" (월광)	1:45
11.	"Sing For You"	3:51
12.	"Call Me Baby"	1:53
13.	"Lady Luck" (유성우)	3:35
14.	"Tender Love"	3:34
15.	"Cloud 9"	3:58
16.	"Love Me Right"	4:03
Total length:		53:28

Disc 2
No.	Title	Length
1.	"Heaven"	3:43
2.	"Girl x Friend"	3:39
3.	"3.6.5"	3:15
4.	"Overdose" (중독)	4:33
5.	"Transformer"	4:23
6.	"Lightsaber"	4:05
7.	"Together" (같이해)	2:39
8.	"Full Moon"	1:54
9.	"Drop That"	4:57
10.	"EXO Keep On Dancing"	3:12
11.	"Lucky"	3:16
12.	"Run"	4:49
13.	"Lotto"	3:12
14.	"Growl" (으르렁)	3:34
15.	"For Life"	3:57
Total length:		55:08

== Sales ==
Region	Sales
China (Xiami)	12,777+

== Release history ==
Region	Date	Format	Label
South Korea	October 25, 2017	CD; DVD	SM; iRiver
Various	October 25, 2017	Digital download; streaming	SM
