= Exo Planet 3 – The Exo'rdium =

2016–17 concert tour by Exo

Exo Planet #3 – "The Exo'rdium"
- World tour by Exo
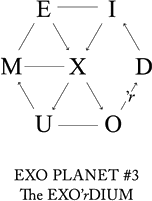
- Associated album: Ex'Act; Lotto; For Life
- Start date: July 22, 2016
- End date: May 28, 2017
- No. of shows: 37
- Website: exo.smtown.com

Exo concert chronology
- Exo Planet #2 – The Exo'luxion (2015–16); Exo Planet #3 – The Exo'rdium (2016–17); Exo Planet #4 – The EℓyXiOn (2017–18)

Exo Planet #3 – The Exo'rdium (stylized as EXO PLANET #3 – The EXO'rDIUM) was the third tour of South Korean-Chinese boy band Exo. The tour was officially announced on June 15, 2016, and began in Seoul's Olympic Gymnastics Arena on July 22, 2016. The first 6 dates were in South Korea, making Exo the first K-pop group to have the longest solo concert series in Seoul.

During the tour, member Kai struggled with an ankle injury, making him unable to fully participate in the first three months of the tour. In February 2017, official announcements were made to announce that the promotions would continue in Mexico and the United States, marking it as Exo's second world tour. It was announced on March 30, 2017, that the tour will conclude in Seoul with two encore performances on May 27 and 28, titled Exo Planet 3 – The Exo'rdium (dot).

== Concerts ==
=== Seoul ===
- The announcement of the tour was made officially by SM Entertainment in June 2016, with six dates in Seoul at the Olympic Gymnastics Arena.
- The EXO'rDIUM was originally announced to kick off on July 23, 2016, with five concerts but due to popular demand, a sixth show was scheduled later for July 22, 2016.
- July 23, 2016 – Kai suffered a re-injury of his ankle during Exo's EXO Planet #3 – The EXO'rDIUM tour. The leader of Exo, Suho, made the announcement to fans on July 24, 2016, during their concert. Kai came on stage later to explain to fans that although he didn't break any bones, he did severely strain the ligaments in his ankle. Following Exo's first three concerts in Seoul, it was announced that Kai would continue taking time off to rest and would not be able to perform during some concert songs.
- July 24, 2016 – Fans became concerned for member Lay after Exo's performance of "Lightsaber". Lay was reportedly seen appearing extremely exhausted and grabbing at his sides in pain before promptly limping off of the stage.
- According to Chung Joo-won from Yonhap News, "The three-hour concert set out with a special movie clip, in which the Exo members are portrayed as supernatural demi-gods who represent different elements of nature, such as fire, water, earth and woods. The fans screamed frantically as their favorite members showed up on the screen, standing high on the Egyptian Sphinx, rescuing an innocent girl in Vietnam War and protecting a little boy from hurricane."
- Exo's six day stunt in Seoul attracted about 84,000 fans. Numerous celebrities were also in attendance.
- On March 30, 2017, Exo's official Vyrl account announced the conclusion of the Exo Planet #3 – The Exo'rdium tour with two encore performances in Seoul. The encore performance was held on May 27 and 28 as "Exo Planet #3 – The Exo'rdium[dot]".

=== China ===
- The EXO'rDIUM was originally scheduled to take place in Hangzhou, Chengdu, and Nanjing. Upon South Korea's announcement that they were going to deploy the United States' THAAD system, China responded by placing heavy restrictions on South Korean artists. Due to this current conflict, all EXO'rDIUM concerts scheduled in China (excluding Hangzhou) have been canceled.
- Tickets for the EXO'rDIUM in Hangzhou sold out in five minutes.
- September 30, 2016, marked the almost full return of member Kai after his previous foot injury. Kai participated in most of the performances for Exo's concert in Hangzhou.

=== Bangkok ===
- Exo's EXO'rDIUM tour in Bangkok sold 24,000 tickets in three minutes, setting a new record.
- Despite arm injuries, Chanyeol and Sehun fully participated in the EXO'rDIUM in Bangkok. Although Kai was present, his physical performance was still limited due to his ongoing recovery from an ankle injury sustained back in July.
- During the September 11 performance, Exo was joined on stage by Yoo Jae-suk for a special performance of 'Dancing King'. This collaboration was part of Jae Suk's mission that he needed to complete from Infinite Challenge.

=== Japan ===
- Exo's concert in Fukuoka (Day 1) also saw an almost full return of member Kai after his previous foot injury. Kai participated in all of Exo's performances except for the performance of 'Overdose'.
- During the Fukuoka (Day 1) performance, Chanyeol sang a cover of Masayoshi Yamazaki's 'One More Time, One More Chance'.
- Exo added their new single 'Coming Over' to the set list for their performances in Tokyo and Osaka.

=== Philippines ===
- Member Lay halted his activities with Exo starting from the concerts held at the Smart Araneta Coliseum (Day 1 and 2).

=== Mexico ===
- On February 1, 2017, an official announcement was made by tour promoter, Dilemma, to announce that Exo would be expanding their Asia Tour to Mexico, thus making the EXO'rDIUM Exo's second World Tour. The concert was held at the Mexico City Arena on April 27, 2017.

=== United States ===
- On February 2, 2017, an official announcement was made by tour promoter, My Music Taste, to announce that the EXO'rDIUM tour would be coming to Newark and Los Angeles.

== Set list ==
Seoul, South Korea

Opening VCR

- MAMA (remix) (KR)
- Monster (remix) (KR)
- 늑대와 미녀 (Wolf) (Remix) (KR)

Ment

- 백색소음 (White Noise) (KR)
- Thunder (KR)
- Playboy (KR)
- Artificial Love (KR)

VCR

- 불공평해 (Unfair) (KR)
- My Lady (acoustic medley) (KR)
- My Turn to Cry (acoustic medley) (KR)
- 월광 (Moonlight) (acoustic medley) (KR)
- Monodrama (acoustic medley) (CH)
- Call Me Baby (acoustic medley) (KR)
- Love, Love, Love (acoustic medley) (KR)
- 유성우 (Lady Luck) (acoustic medley) (KR)
- What If (KR)
- Tender Love (KR)
- Love Me Right (KR)
- 유리어항 (One and Only) (KR)
- Stronger (KR)

VCR

- Heaven (KR)
- XOXO (KR)
- Girl x Friend (KR)
- 3.6.5. (KR)

VCR

- Overdose (KR)
- Transformer (KR)
- Lightsaber (KR)

Ment

- 같이해 (Do It Together) (KR)
- Full Moon (KR)
- Drop That (KR)
- Let Out The Beast (KR)
- Lucky (KR)
- Run (remix) (KR)

(Encore)

- Cloud 9 (KR)
- 으르렁 (Growl) (remix) (KR)
- Lucky One (KR)

Ment

- 너의 세상으로 (Into Your World) (KR)
Bangkok, Thailand

Opening VCR

- MAMA (remix) (KR)
- Monster (remix) (KR)
- 늑대와 미녀 (Wolf) (Remix) (KR)

Ment

- 백색소음 (White Noise) (KR)
- Thunder (KR)
- Playboy (KR)
- Artificial Love (KR)

VCR

- 불공평해 (Unfair) (KR)
- My Lady (acoustic medley) (KR)
- My Turn to Cry (acoustic medley) (KR)
- 월광 (Moonlight) (acoustic medley) (KR)
- Monodrama (acoustic medley) (CH)
- Call Me Baby (acoustic medley) (KR)
- Love, Love, Love (acoustic medley) (KR)
- 유성우 (Lady Luck) (acoustic medley) (KR)
- What If (KR)
- Tender Love (KR)
- Love Me Right (KR)
- 유리어항 (One and Only) (KR)
- Stronger (KR)

VCR (Lucky)

- Heaven (KR)
- Girl x Friend (KR)
- 3.6.5. (KR)

VCR (Tender Love + BeatBurger Remix)

- Overdose (KR)
- Transformer (KR)
- Lightsaber (remix) (KR)

Ment

- 같이해 (Do It Together) (KR)
- Full Moon (KR)
- Dancing King ft. Yoo Jae-suk (KR) (Day 2 Only)

'Ment' ft. Yoo Jae-suk (Day 2 Only)

- Drop That (KR)
- Let Out The Beast (remix) (KR)
- Lucky (KR)
- Run (remix) (KR)

VCR (Sing For You)

- 으르렁 (Growl) (remix) (KR)
- Lucky One (KR)

Ment

- 너의 세상으로 (Into Your World) (KR)
Hangzhou, China

Opening VCR

- MAMA (remix) (KR)
- Monster (remix) (CH)
- 늑대와 미녀 (Wolf) (Remix) (KR)

Ment

- 백색소음 (White Noise) (KR)
- Thunder (KR)
- Playboy (KR)
- Artificial Love (KR)

VCR

- 불공평해 (Unfair) (KR)
- My Lady (acoustic medley) (KR)
- My Turn to Cry (acoustic medley) (KR)
- 월광 (Moonlight) (acoustic medley) (KR)
- Monodrama (acoustic medley) (CH)
- Call Me Baby (acoustic medley) (KR)
- Love, Love, Love (acoustic medley) (KR)
- 유성우 (Lady Luck) (acoustic medley) (KR)
- What If (KR)
- Tender Love (KR)
- Love Me Right (CH)
- 유리어항 (One and Only) (KR)
- Stronger (KR)

VCR (Lucky)

- Heaven (KR)
- Girl x Friend (KR)
- 3.6.5. (KR)

VCR (Tender Love + BeatBurger Remix)

- Overdose (KR)
- Transformer (KR)
- Lightsaber (remix) (KR)

Ment

- 같이해 (Do It Together) (KR)
- Full Moon (KR)
- Drop That (KR)
- Let Out The Beast (remix) (KR)
- Lucky (KR)
- Run (remix) (KR)

VCR (Sing For You)

- 으르렁 (Growl) (remix) (CH)
- Lucky One (KR)

Ment

- 너의 세상으로 (Into Your World) (KR)
Japan

Opening VCR

- MAMA (remix) (KR)
- Monster (remix) (KR)
- 늑대와 미녀 (Wolf) (Remix) (KR)

Ment

- 백색소음 (White Noise) (KR)
- Thunder (KR)
- Playboy (KR)
- Artificial Love (KR)

VCR

- 불공평해 (Unfair) (KR)
- My Lady (acoustic medley) (KR)
- My Turn to Cry (acoustic medley) (KR)
- 월광 (Moonlight) (acoustic medley) (KR)
- Monodrama (acoustic medley) (CH)
- Call Me Baby (acoustic medley) (KR)
- Love, Love, Love (acoustic medley) (KR)
- 유성우 (Lady Luck) (acoustic medley) (KR)
- What If (KR)
- Tender Love (KR)
- Love Me Right (JP)
- 유리어항 (One and Only) (KR)
- Stronger (KR)

VCR (Lucky)

- Heaven (KR)
- Girl x Friend (KR)
- 3.6.5. (KR)

VCR (Tender Love + BeatBurger Remix)

- Overdose (KR)
- Transformer (KR)
- Lightsaber (remix) (JP)

Ment

- 같이해 (Do It Together) (KR)
- Full Moon (KR)
- Coming Over (JP) (Tokyo and Osaka only)
- Drop That (JP)
- Let Out The Beast (remix) (KR) (Hiroshima only)
- Lucky (KR)
- Run (remix) (KR)

VCR (Sing For You)

- 으르렁 (Growl) (remix) (KR)
- Lucky One (KR)

Ment

- 너의 세상으로 (Into Your World) (KR)
Taipei, Taiwan

Opening VCR

- MAMA (remix) (KR)
- Monster (remix) (CH)
- 늑대와 미녀 (Wolf) (Remix) (KR)

Ment

- 백색소음 (White Noise) (KR)
- Thunder (KR)
- Playboy (KR)
- Artificial Love (KR)

VCR

- 불공평해 (Unfair) (KR)
- My Lady (acoustic medley) (KR)
- My Turn to Cry (acoustic medley) (KR)
- 월광 (Moonlight) (acoustic medley) (KR)
- Monodrama (acoustic medley) (CH)
- Call Me Baby (acoustic medley) (KR)
- Love, Love, Love (acoustic medley) (KR)
- 유성우 (Lady Luck) (acoustic medley) (KR)
- What If (KR)
- Tender Love (KR)
- Love Me Right (CH)
- 유리어항 (One and Only) (KR)
- Stronger (KR)

VCR (Lucky)

- Heaven (KR)
- Girl x Friend (KR)
- 3.6.5. (KR)

VCR (Tender Love + BeatBurger Remix)

- Overdose (KR)
- Transformer (KR)
- Lightsaber (remix) (KR)

Ment

- 같이해 (Do It Together) (KR)
- Full Moon (KR)
- Drop That (KR)
- Lucky (KR)
- Run (remix) (KR)

VCR (Sing For You)

- 으르렁 (Growl) (remix) (CH)
- Lucky One (KR)

Ment

- 너의 세상으로 (Into Your World) (KR)
Hong Kong

Opening VCR

- MAMA (remix) (KR)
- Monster (remix) (CH)
- 늑대와 미녀 (Wolf) (Remix) (KR)

Ment

- 백색소음 (White Noise) (KR)
- Thunder (KR)
- Playboy (KR)
- Artificial Love (KR)

VCR

- 불공평해 (Unfair) (KR)
- My Lady (acoustic medley) (KR)
- My Turn to Cry (acoustic medley) (KR)
- 월광 (Moonlight) (acoustic medley) (KR)
- Monodrama (acoustic medley) (CH)
- Call Me Baby (acoustic medley) (KR)
- Love, Love, Love (acoustic medley) (KR)
- 유성우 (Lady Luck) (acoustic medley) (KR)
- What If (KR)
- Tender Love (KR)
- Love Me Right (CH)
- 유리어항 (One and Only) (KR)
- Stronger (KR)

VCR (Lucky)

- Heaven (KR)
- Girl x Friend (KR)
- 3.6.5. (KR)

VCR (Tender Love + BeatBurger Remix)

- Overdose (KR)
- Transformer (KR)
- Lightsaber (remix) (KR)

Ment

- 같이해 (Do It Together) (KR)
- Full Moon (KR)
- Drop That (KR)
- Lucky (KR)
- Run (remix) (KR)

VCR (Sing For You)

- 으르렁 (Growl) (remix) (CH)
- Lucky One (KR)

Ment

- 너의 세상으로 (Into Your World) (KR)
Manila, Philippines

Opening VCR

- MAMA (remix) (KR)
- Monster (remix) (KR)
- 늑대와 미녀 (Wolf) (Remix) (KR)

Ment

- 백색소음 (White Noise) (KR)
- Thunder (KR)
- Playboy (KR)
- Artificial Love (KR)

VCR

- 불공평해 (Unfair) (KR)
- My Lady (acoustic medley) (KR)
- My Turn to Cry (acoustic medley) (KR)
- 월광 (Moonlight) (acoustic medley) (KR)
- Call Me Baby (acoustic medley) (KR)
- Love, Love, Love (acoustic medley) (KR)
- 유성우 (Lady Luck) (acoustic medley) (KR)
- What If (KR)
- Tender Love (KR)
- Love Me Right (KR)
- 유리어항 (One and Only) (KR)
- Stronger (KR)

VCR (Lucky)

- Heaven (KR)
- Girl x Friend (KR)
- 3.6.5. (KR)

VCR (Tender Love + BeatBurger Remix)

- Overdose (KR)
- Transformer (KR)
- Lightsaber (remix) (KR)

Ment

- 같이해 (Do It Together) (KR)
- Full Moon (KR)
- Drop That (KR)
- Lucky (KR)
- Run (remix) (KR)

VCR (Sing For You)

- 으르렁 (Growl) (remix) (KR)
- Lucky One (KR)

Ment

- 너의 세상으로 (Into Your World) (KR)
Kuala Lumpur, Malaysia

Opening VCR

- MAMA (remix) (KR)
- Monster (remix) (KR)
- 늑대와 미녀 (Wolf) (Remix) (KR)

Ment

- 백색소음 (White Noise) (KR)
- Thunder (KR)
- Playboy (KR)
- Artificial Love (KR)

VCR

- 불공평해 (Unfair) (KR)
- My Lady (acoustic medley) (KR)
- My Turn to Cry (acoustic medley) (KR)
- 월광 (Moonlight) (acoustic medley) (KR)
- Call Me Baby (acoustic medley) (KR)
- Love, Love, Love (acoustic medley) (KR)
- 유성우 (Lady Luck) (acoustic medley) (KR)
- What If (KR)
- Tender Love (KR)
- Love Me Right (KR)
- 유리어항 (One and Only) (KR)
- Stronger (KR)

VCR (Lucky)

- Heaven (KR)
- Girl x Friend (KR)
- 3.6.5. (KR)

VCR (Tender Love + BeatBurger Remix)

- Overdose (KR)
- Transformer (KR)
- Lightsaber (remix) (KR)

Ment

- 같이해 (Do It Together) (KR)
- Full Moon (KR)
- Drop That (KR)
- Lucky (KR)
- Run (remix) (KR)

VCR (Sing For You)

- 으르렁 (Growl) (remix) (KR)
- Lucky One (KR)

Ment

- 너의 세상으로 (Into Your World) (KR)
Singapore

Opening VCR

- MAMA (remix) (KR)
- Monster (remix) (KR)
- 늑대와 미녀 (Wolf) (Remix) (KR)

Ment

- 백색소음 (White Noise) (KR)
- Thunder (KR)
- Playboy (KR)
- Artificial Love (KR)

VCR

- 불공평해 (Unfair) (KR)
- My Lady (acoustic medley) (KR)
- My Turn to Cry (acoustic medley) (KR)
- 월광 (Moonlight) (acoustic medley) (KR)
- Call Me Baby (acoustic medley) (KR)
- Love, Love, Love (acoustic medley) (KR)
- 유성우 (Lady Luck) (acoustic medley) (KR)
- What If (KR)
- Tender Love (KR)
- Love Me Right (KR)
- 유리어항 (One and Only) (KR)
- Stronger (KR)

VCR (Lucky)

- Heaven (KR)
- Girl x Friend (KR)
- 3.6.5. (KR)

VCR (Tender Love + BeatBurger Remix)

- Overdose (KR)
- Transformer (KR)
- Lightsaber (remix) (KR)

Ment

- 같이해 (Do It Together) (KR)
- Full Moon (KR)
- Drop That (KR)
- Lucky (KR)
- Run (remix) (KR)

VCR (Sing For You)

- 으르렁 (Growl) (remix) (KR)
- Lucky One (KR)

Ment

- 너의 세상으로 (Into Your World) (KR)
Mexico City, Mexico

Opening VCR

- MAMA (remix) (KR)
- Monster (remix) (KR)
- 늑대와 미녀 (Wolf) (Remix) (KR)

Ment

- 백색소음 (White Noise) (KR)
- Thunder (KR)
- Playboy (KR)
- Artificial Love (KR)

VCR

- 불공평해 (Unfair) (KR)
- Sabor a mi (ESP)
- My Lady (acoustic medley) (KR)
- My Turn to Cry (acoustic medley) (KR)
- 월광 (Moonlight) (acoustic medley) (KR)
- Call Me Baby (acoustic medley) (KR)
- Love, Love, Love (acoustic medley) (KR)
- 유성우 (Lady Luck) (acoustic medley) (KR)
- Tender Love (KR)
- Love Me Right (KR)
- Stronger (KR)

VCR (Lucky)

- Heaven (KR)
- Girl x Friend (KR)
- 3.6.5. (KR)

VCR (Tender Love + BeatBurger Remix)

- Overdose (KR)
- Transformer (KR)
- Lightsaber (remix) (KR)

Ment

- 같이해 (Do It Together) (KR)
- Full Moon (KR)
- Drop That (KR)
- Keep on Dancing
- Lucky (KR)
- Run (remix) (KR)

VCR (Sing For You)

- 으르렁 (Growl) (remix) (KR)
- Lucky One (KR)

Ment

- 너의 세상으로 (Into Your World) (KR)
United States

Opening VCR

- MAMA (remix) (KR)
- Monster (remix) (KR)
- 늑대와 미녀 (Wolf) (Remix) (KR)

Ment

- 백색소음 (White Noise) (KR)
- Thunder (KR)
- Playboy (KR)
- Artificial Love (KR)

VCR

- My Lady (acoustic medley) (KR)
- My Turn to Cry (acoustic medley) (KR)
- 월광 (Moonlight) (acoustic medley) (KR)
- Call Me Baby (acoustic medley) (KR)
- Love, Love, Love (acoustic medley) (KR)
- 유성우 (Lady Luck) (acoustic medley) (KR)
- Tender Love (KR)
- Love Me Right (KR)
- Stronger (KR)

VCR (Lucky)

- Heaven (KR)
- Girl x Friend (KR)
- 3.6.5. (KR)

VCR (Tender Love + BeatBurger Remix)

- Overdose (KR)
- Transformer (KR)
- Lightsaber (remix) (KR)

Ment

- 같이해 (Do It Together) (KR)
- Full Moon (KR)
- Drop That (KR)
- Lucky (KR)
- Run (remix) (KR)

VCR (Sing For You)

- 으르렁 (Growl) (remix) (KR)
- Lucky One (KR)

Ment

- 너의 세상으로 (Into Your World) (KR)
Seoul, South Korea (Encore Show)

Opening VCR

- MAMA (remix) (KR)
- Monster (remix) (KR)
- 늑대와 미녀 (Wolf) (Remix) (KR)

Ment

- 백색소음 (White Noise) (KR)
- Thunder (KR)
- Playboy (KR)
- Artificial Love (KR)

VCR

- 불공평해 (Unfair) (KR)
- My Lady (acoustic medley) (KR)
- My Turn to Cry (acoustic medley) (KR)
- 월광 (Moonlight) (acoustic medley) (KR)
- Sing For You (acoustic medley) (KR)
- Call Me Baby (acoustic medley) (KR)
- Love, Love, Love (acoustic medley) (KR)
- 유성우 (Lady Luck) (acoustic medley) (KR)
- Tender Love (KR)
- Cloud 9 (KR)
- Love Me Right (KR)

VCR

- Heaven (KR)
- Winter Heat (KR)
- Girl x Friend (KR)
- 3.6.5. (KR)

VCR

- Overdose (KR)
- Transformer (KR)
- Lightsaber (KR)

Ment

- 같이해 (Do It Together) (KR)
- Twenty Four (KR)
- Full Moon (KR)
- Drop That (KR)
- Let Out The Beast (KR)
- Lucky (KR)
- Run (remix) (KR)

(Encore)

- Louder (KR)
- 으르렁 (Growl) (remix) (KR)
- Lucky One (KR)

Ment

- For Life (KR)

== Tour dates ==
Date	City	Country	Venue	Attendance
July 22, 2016	Seoul	South Korea	Olympic Gymnastics Arena	84,000
July 23, 2016	Seoul	South Korea	Olympic Gymnastics Arena	84,000
July 24, 2016	Seoul	South Korea	Olympic Gymnastics Arena	84,000
July 29, 2016	Seoul	South Korea	Olympic Gymnastics Arena	84,000
July 30, 2016	Seoul	South Korea	Olympic Gymnastics Arena	84,000
July 31, 2016	Seoul	South Korea	Olympic Gymnastics Arena	84,000
September 10, 2016	Bangkok	Thailand	Impact Arena	24,000
September 11, 2016	Bangkok	Thailand	Impact Arena	24,000
September 13, 2016	Hiroshima	Japan	Hiroshima Green Arena	(Note: The score data is combined from all 15 shows held in Japan during the tour.)
September 14, 2016	Hiroshima	Japan	Hiroshima Green Arena	(Note: The score data is combined from all 15 shows held in Japan during the tour.)
September 30, 2016	Hangzhou	China	Huanglong Stadium	10,000
October 2, 2016	Fukuoka	Japan	Fukuoka Convention Center	320,000
October 3, 2016	Fukuoka	Japan	Fukuoka Convention Center	320,000
October 4, 2016	Fukuoka	Japan	Fukuoka Convention Center	320,000
October 12, 2016	Hokkaido	Japan	Makomanai Ice Arena	320,000
October 13, 2016	Hokkaido	Japan	Makomanai Ice Arena	320,000
November 7, 2016	Nagoya	Japan	Nippon Gaishi Hall	320,000
November 8, 2016	Nagoya	Japan	Nippon Gaishi Hall	320,000
November 9, 2016	Nagoya	Japan	Nippon Gaishi Hall	320,000
November 26, 2016	Taipei	Taiwan	Taipei Arena	22,000
November 27, 2016	Taipei	Taiwan	Taipei Arena	22,000
November 30, 2016	Tokyo	Japan	Tokyo Dome	
December 1, 2016	Tokyo	Japan	Tokyo Dome	
December 9, 2016	Osaka	Japan	Kyocera Dome	
December 10, 2016	Osaka	Japan	Kyocera Dome	
December 11, 2016	Osaka	Japan	Kyocera Dome	
February 11, 2017	Hong Kong	China	AsiaWorld–Expo	20,000
February 12, 2017	Hong Kong	China	AsiaWorld–Expo	20,000
February 25, 2017	Quezon City	Philippines	Araneta Coliseum	—
February 26, 2017	Quezon City	Philippines	Araneta Coliseum	—
March 18, 2017	Kuala Lumpur	Malaysia	Stadium Merdeka	10,000
April 2, 2017	Singapore		Singapore Indoor Stadium	8,000
April 25, 2017	Newark	United States	Prudential Center	5,999
April 27, 2017	Mexico City	Mexico	Mexico City Arena	—
April 28, 2017	Inglewood	United States	The Forum	8,668
May 27, 2017	Seoul	South Korea	Seoul Olympic Stadium	70,000
May 28, 2017	Seoul	South Korea	Seoul Olympic Stadium	70,000
Total				610,000

=== Boxscore ===
Venue	City	Tickets sold / available	Gross revenue
Prudential Center	Newark, New Jersey	5,999 / 10,967 (54.7%)	$998,411
The Forum	Inglewood, California	8,668 / 9,739 (89%)	$1,436,158

== Personnel ==
Tour organizer

- SM Entertainment

Artists

- EXO-K (Suho, Baekhyun, Chanyeol, D.O., Kai, Sehun)
- EXO-M (Lay, Xiumin, Chen)

Note: Lay made his last public appearance with the group in the Hong Kong concerts due to overlapping schedules with his personal alignments.

Tour promoter

- Dream Maker Entertainment (KR)
- SM True (TH)
- Star Planet (MY)
- Malaysia Major Events (MY)
- PULP Live World (PH)
- ONE Production (SG)
- Dilemma (MX)
- MyMusicTaste (US)

Ticketing partners

- YES24 (KR)
- All Ticket (TH)
- Damai (CH)
- Ticketnet (PH)
- TicketCharge (MY)
- Sports Hub Tix (SG)
- Superboletos (MX)
- TicketMaster (US)
