= Countdown (Exo album) =

- Digital and Blu-ray edition cover

Studio album by Exo
- Released: January 31, 2018
- Recorded: 2015–2017
- Studios: InGrid (Seoul); Sony Music (Tokyo)
- Genre: J-pop
- Length: 36:11
- Languages: Japanese; English
- Labels: Avex Trax; SM Japan
- Producer: Nam So-young

Exo chronology
Universe (2017)	Countdown (2018)	Don't Mess Up My Tempo (2018)

Singles from Countdown
- 1. "Love Me Right ~romantic universe~" Released: November 4, 2015; 2. "Lightsaber" Released: December 17, 2015; 3. "Coming Over" Released: December 7, 2016; 4. "Electric Kiss" Released: January 31, 2018

Countdown is the first Japanese-language studio album (fifth overall) by South Korean boy band Exo. It was released by Avex Trax and SM Entertainment Japan on January 31, 2018. The album contains previously released Japanese tracks along with four new songs, including the lead song "Electric Kiss".

== Release ==
On November 4, 2017, Exo was announced to be releasing their first Japanese studio album on January 24, 2018. Ahead of the release of the music video for "Electric Kiss", Exo shared individual member teaser clips from November 18 to November 25 for their upcoming Japanese album. The release was later postponed to January 31, 2018. Member Lay is heard in the six previously released songs but did not participate in recording for the new songs due to conflicts with his promotional schedules in China.

== Promotion ==
Exo performed "Electric Kiss" for the first time on January 26, 2018 on the Japanese morning TV show Sukkiri. On January 27 and 28, Exo added "Electric Kiss" and "Cosmic Railway" to the set list of their tour Exo Planet #4 – The ElyXion in Saitama and Osaka.

== Commercial performance ==
The album debuted atop the Oricon Weekly Album Chart, making Exo the first international group to have their first single and full album in Japan reach number one on Oricon's weekly chart. Countdown also continued in first place on Oricon's daily album chart for three consecutive days after its release, marking first place four times in total during the first week.

According to Oricon, Exo's album recorded an estimated 89,000 units in sales within the first week of release.

On February 9, 2018, the Recording Industry Association of Japan (RIAJ) announced that Countdown had sold over 100,000 copies and received a gold certification. The album reached the benchmark within only ten days of its release on January 31, 2018.

== Track listing ==
Countdown track listing
No.	Title	Lyrics	Music	Arrangement	Length
1.	"Electric Kiss"	Junji Ishiwatari	Obi Mhondera (InnerV8 Musiq); Kyler Niko (InnerV8 Musiq); Evan Berard	InnerV8 Musiq	3:27
2.	"Coming Over"	Amon Hayashi (Digz Inc.)	Andreas Öberg; Darren "Baby Dee Beats" Smith; Drew Ryan Scott; Sean Alexander (Avenue 52)	Avenue 52	3:22
3.	"Love Me Right ~romantic universe~"	Oh Yoo Won; Kim Dong-hyun; Sara Sakurai (T's Music)	iDR; Nermin Harambašić; Ryan S. Jhun; Courtney Woolsey; Peter Tambakis; Jarah Lafayette Gibson	iDR; Nermin Harambašić; Ryan S. Jhun; Courtney Woolsey; Peter Tambakis; Jarah Lafayette Gibson	3:26
4.	"Lightsaber"	Sara Sakurai (T's Music); Chanyeol; MQ (BeatBurger); Jung Joo-hee	LDN Noise; Adrian McKinnon	LDN Noise	3:05
5.	"Tactix"	Kami Kaoru	Hanif Sabzevari (Hitmanic); Daniel Kim	Hitmanic	3:43
6.	"Into My World"	Sara Sakurai (T's Music)	Joonathan Kettunen; Daniel Kim	Joonathan Kettunen	3:43
7.	"Lovin' You Mo'"	Amon Hayashi (Digz Inc.)	KAY; Sean Alexander (Avenue 52); Darren "Baby Dee Beats" Smith	Avenue 52	3:44
8.	"Drop That"	MQ (BeatBurger); Jae Shim (BeatBurger); Hidenori Tanaka (agehasprings)	Shaun; Jae Shim (BeatBurger); Andreas Öberg; Maria Marcus	Maria Marcus	3:36
9.	"Run This"	Amon Hayashi (Digz Inc.)	Mark Alvin Thompson; David Anthony Eames	David Anthony Eames	3:23
10.	"Cosmic Railway"	Sara Sakurai (T's Music)	Steven Lee; Tom Hugo	Steven Lee	4:38
Total length:					36:11

== Charts ==
Weekly chart performance for Countdown
Chart (2018)	Peak position
French Download Albums (SNEP)	126
Japanese Albums (Oricon)	1
Japan Hot Albums (Billboard Japan)	1
US World Albums (Billboard)	4

Year-end chart performance for Countdown
Chart (2018)	Position
Japanese Albums (Oricon)	31

== Certifications ==
Certifications for Countdown
Region	Certification	Certified units/sales
Japan (RIAJ)	Gold	123,489

== Release history ==
Release history and formats for Countdown
Region	Date	Format	Label
Japan	January 31, 2018	CD; DVD	Avex Trax; SM Japan
Various	January 31, 2018	Digital download; streaming	Avex Trax; SM Japan
