= Coming Over (Exo song) =

- Digital cover

Single by EXO

from the album Countdown
- B-side: "Tactix"; "Run This"
- Released: December 7, 2016
- Recorded: 2016
- Studio: Sony Music (Tokyo); Victor (Tokyo)
- Genre: J-pop; dance; rock
- Length: 20:00
- Label: Avex Trax
- Composers: Andreas Öberg; Darren Smith; Drew Ryan Scott; Sean Alexander
- Lyricist: Amon Hayashi (Digz Inc.)
- Producers: Avenue 52; Darren Smith; Daniel Kim; David Anthony; Hanif Hitmanic Sabzevari

EXO Japanese singles chronology
"Love Me Right ~Romantic Universe~" (2015)	"Coming Over" (2016)	"Electric Kiss" (2018)

Music video
- "Coming Over" on YouTube

"Coming Over" is the second Japanese single by the South Korean–Chinese boy group EXO. It was released on December 7, 2016 by Avex Trax in Japan. In South Korea, the single was released on January 4, 2017. The single features six tracks, including three original songs. The single was re-released on January 31, 2018 along with EXO's first Japanese studio album COUNTDOWN.

== Background and release ==
On September 7, EXO announced through a video that they would be releasing their second Japanese single titled "Coming Over" containing three original Japanese tracks in December. On October 7, the full song was made available in Japan through the AWA application, a popular Japanese streaming service, and was played over 100,000 times in the 12 hours before the promotional event ended. A short version of the music video for "Coming Over" was released on November 18. The single was officially released on December 7.

== Live performance ==
EXO began performing "Coming Over" in their Exo Planet 3 – The Exo'rdium concerts in Tokyo and Osaka. The group performed "Coming Over" on a-nation concert on August 26, 2017.

== Commercial performance ==
"Coming Over" sold over 150,000 copies within the first week of its release, making EXO the first international artist to have two consecutive Japanese single albums with first-week sales of over 100,000 copies. The single ranked at number 41 on Oricon's 2016 year-end singles chart, the highest position among songs by South Korean artists.

== Track listing ==
No.	Title	Lyrics	Music	Length
1.	"Coming Over"	Amon Hayashi (Digz Inc.)	Andreas Öberg, Darren Smith, Drew Ryan Scott, Sean Alexander	3:21
2.	"Tactix"	Kamikaoru (カミカオル)	Hanif Sabzevari, Daniel Kim	3:43
3.	"Run This"	Amon Hayashi (Digz Inc.)	Mark Alvin Thompson, David Anthony Eames	3:23
4.	"Coming Over" (Instrumental)		Andreas Öberg, Darren Smith, Drew Ryan Scott, Sean Alexander	3:21
5.	"Tactix" (Instrumental)		Hanif Sabzevari, Daniel Kim	3:43
6.	"Run This" (Instrumantal)		Mark Alvin Thompson, David Anthony Eames	3:23
Total length:				20:54

== Charts ==
=== Weekly charts ===
Chart (2016)	Peak position
Japan (Oricon)	2
Japan (Japan Hot 100)	3
South Korea (Gaon)	15 (Note: "Coming Over" charted at number 15 on the Gaon International Digital Chart)

=== Monthly charts ===
Chart (2016)	Peak position
Japan (Oricon)	5

=== Year-end charts ===
Chart (2016)	Peak position
Japan (Oricon)	41

== Sales ==
Region	Sales
Japan (Oricon)	157,499
South Korea (Gaon)	10,000

== Release history ==
Region	Date	Format	Label
Japan	December 7, 2016	CD single; DVD single	Avex Trax
Various	December 7, 2016	Digital download; streaming	Avex Trax
South Korea	January 4, 2017	Digital download; streaming	SM; KT
