= Universe (Exo song) =

2017 single by Exo

Single by Exo

from the EP Universe
- Language: Korean; Mandarin
- Released: December 26, 2017
- Recorded: 2017
- Studio: SM LVYIN (Seoul)
- Genre: Soft rock
- Length: 4:24
- Label: SM; Genie
- Composers: Hyuk Shin; Marco Reyes; JJ Evans; Jeff Lewis
- Lyricists: Sarah Yoon; Xiao Han
- Producers: Hyuk Shin; MRey

Exo singles chronology
| "Power" (2017) | "Universe" (2017) | "Electric Kiss" (2018) |

Music video
- "Universe" (Korean Ver.) on YouTube "Universe" (Chinese Ver.) on YouTube

"Universe" is a song by South Korean–Chinese boy band Exo, released on December 26, 2017, as the lead single of their sixth extended play Universe. It was released in both Korean and Chinese versions by their label SM Entertainment.

== Background and release ==
Produced by Shin Hyuk and MRey, "Universe" is described as a soft pop-rock ballad, with lyrics about how a person will search the universe just to find their lover. The song was released on December 26 with the album.

== Music video ==
The Korean and Chinese music videos for "Universe" were released on December 26, 2017. It features Exo "melancholically reflecting on the caffeinated beverage and performing different activities that serve as metaphors for the tightly-wound, messy emotions described in the lyrics".

The Korean music video has over 44 million views on YouTube.

== Promotion ==
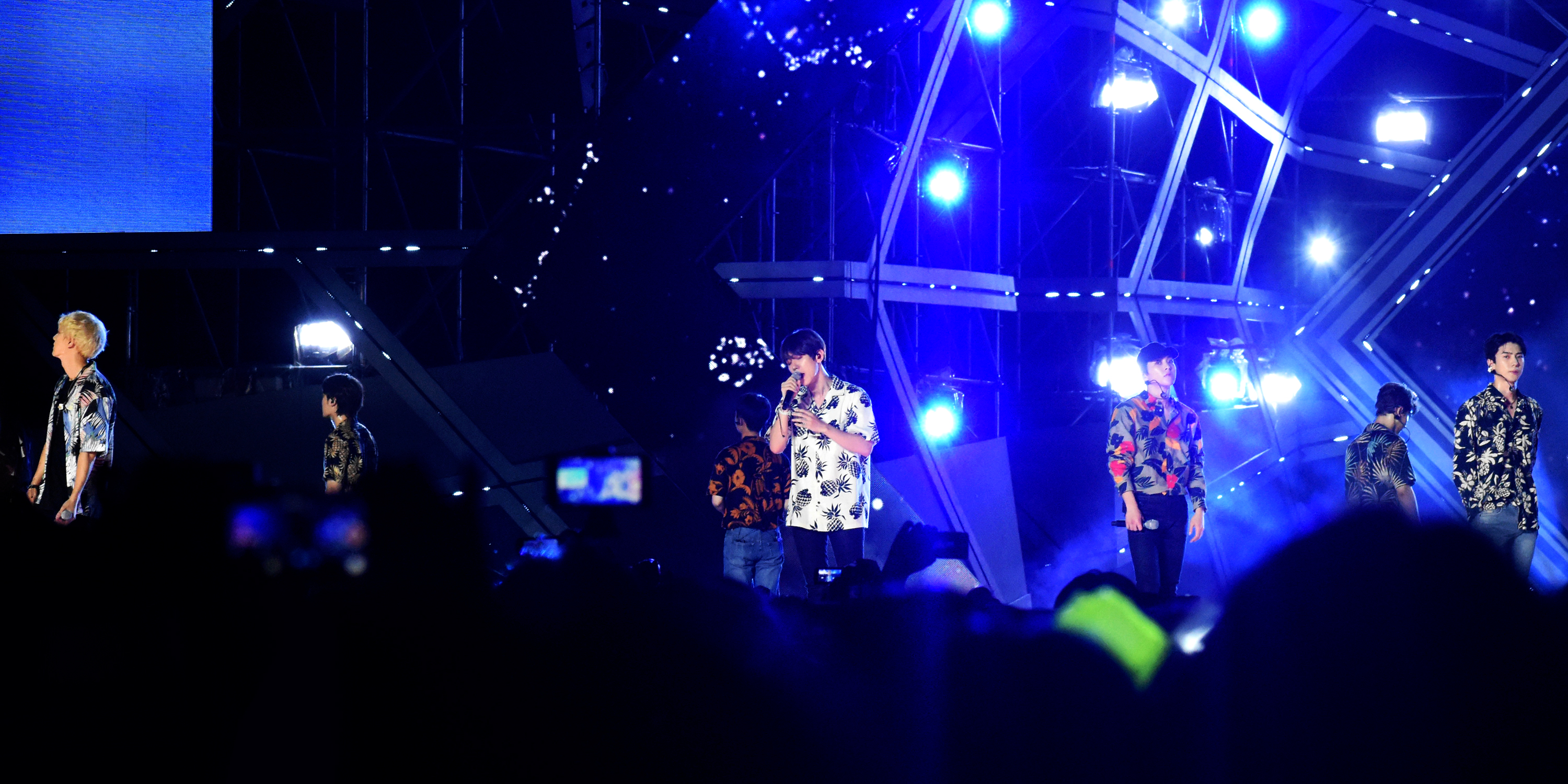
Exo performing "Universe" at the 2018 Incheon Airport Sky Festival

Exo performed "Universe" for the first time on December 31 on MBC's year-end show, MBC Gayo Daejejeon. The song was also performed during Nature Republic's Green Nature Exo Fan Festival on February 3, 2018.

== Commercial performance ==
"Universe" debuted at number two on the South Korean Gaon Digital Chart. It also topped the Billboard Korea Kpop Hot 100 for the first week of 2018.

== Credits and personnel ==
Credits adapted from the album's liner notes.

=== Studio ===
- SM LVYIN Studio – recording
- SM Concert Hall Studio – mixing
- Sterling Sound – mastering

=== Personnel ===
- SM Entertainment – executive producer
- Lee Soo-man – producer
- Yoo Young-jin – music and sound supervisor
- Exo – vocals
  - Chen – background vocals
- Sarah Yoon – Korean lyrics
- Xiao Han – Chinese lyrics
- Hyuk Shin – producer, composition, arrangement
- Marco "MRey" Reyes – producer, composition, arrangement
- JJ Evans – composition
- Jeff Lewis – composition
- Seo Mi-rae – vocal directing, background vocals, Pro Tools operating, digital editing
- Lee Ji-hong – recording
- Nam Koong-jin – mixing
- Randy Merrill – mastering

== Charts ==
=== Weekly charts ===
| Chart (2017–18) | Peak position |
|---|---|
| China (Billboard V Chart) | 7 |
| Philippines (Philippine Hot 100) | 65 |
| South Korea (Kpop Hot 100) | 1 |
| South Korea (Gaon Digital Chart) | 2 |

=== Monthly charts ===
| Chart (2018) | Peak position |
|---|---|
| South Korean (Gaon Digital Chart) | 21 |

=== Yearly charts ===
| Chart (2018) | Peak position |
|---|---|
| South Korean (Gaon Digital Chart) | 69 |

== Sales ==
=== Downloads ===
| Region | Sales |
|---|---|
| South Korea | 140,698+ |

== Accolades ==
| Year | Award | Category | Result |
|---|---|---|---|
| 2017 | Gaon Chart Music Awards | Song of the Year – December | Nominated |
| 2018 | Korea Popular Music Awards | Best Digital Song | Nominated |
| 2019 | Golden Disk Awards | Digital Bonsang | Nominated |

=== Music program awards ===
| Program | Date |
|---|---|
| Music Bank (KBS) | January 5, 2018 |
| Music Bank (KBS) | January 12, 2018 |
| Show! Music Core (MBC) | January 6, 2018 |

== Release history ==
| Region | Date | Format | Label |
|---|---|---|---|
| South Korea | December 26, 2017 | Digital download; streaming | SM; Genie |
| Various | December 26, 2017 | Digital download; streaming | SM |
