= Lightsaber (song) =

- Korean version cover

Single by Exo

from the EP Sing for You
- Language: Korean; Mandarin; Japanese
- Released: November 11, 2015 (Korean); December 10, 2015 (Chinese); December 17, 2015 (Japanese)
- Recorded: 2015
- Studio: In Grid (Seoul)
- Genre: Vocal trance; pop
- Length: 3:04
- Label: SM; KT Music; Avex Trax
- Composers: Adrian McKinnon; LDN Noise
- Lyricists: Chanyeol (KR); Jung Joo-hee (KR); MQ (KR); Wang Yajun (ZH); Sara Sakurai (JP)
- Producer: LDN Noise

Exo singles chronology
"Love Me Right" (2015)	"Lightsaber" (2015)	"Sing for You" (2015)

Music video
- "Lightsaber (Korean ver.)" on YouTube "Lightsaber (Chinese ver.)" on YouTube "Lightsaber (Japanese ver.)" on YouTube

"Lightsaber" is a song by South Korean–Chinese boy band Exo for their collaboration with Star Wars. The Korean-language version was released on November 11, 2015, by their label SM Entertainment, and was later announced as a bonus track for the group's fourth EP Sing for You. It was released in both Korean and Chinese versions on December 10, 2015, alongside the EP. The single was later released in Japanese on December 17, 2015, by Avex Trax.

== Background and release ==
On November 4, 2015, EXO was announced to be releasing "Lightsaber", a promotional song for the movie Star Wars: The Force Awakens in South Korea, as part of the collaboration project between S.M. Entertainment and Walt Disney. A teaser video for the song was released on November 8, followed by its music video and digital release on November 11. "Lightsaber" was later announced to be included in Sing for You as a bonus track on December 7. The song talks about a guy being the girl's "lifesaver" and her "lightsaber" and brings her out of her darkness.

== Music video ==
The music video of "Lightsaber" includes only three members of the group Baekhyun, Kai and Sehun, the members are seen to be in a Star Wars-inspired world where clubs are "Jedi Only" and they carry lightsabers.

== Live performance ==
EXO performed the song for the first time at the 17th Mnet Asian Music Awards. The group later performed the song during their concerts.

== Reception ==
The song peaked at number 9 on Gaon's digital chart, number 84 on Billboard Japan Hot 100, and at number 3 on Billboard World Digital Songs chart.

== Credits ==
Credits adapted from the EP's liner notes.

Studio

- In Grid Studio – recording, digital editing
- SM Yellow Tail Studio – mixing
- Sterling Sound – mastering

Personnel

- SM Entertainment – executive producer
- Lee Soo-man – producer
- Kim Young-min – executive supervisor
- Exo – vocals
  - Chanyeol – Korean lyrics
  - D.O. – background vocals
- Jung Joo-hee – Korean lyrics
- MQ – Korean lyrics, vocal directing
- Wang Yajun – Chinese lyrics
- Sara Sakurai – Japanese lyrics
- LDN Noise – producer, composition, arrangement
- Adrian McKinnon – composition, background vocals
- Lee Joo-hyung – vocal directing, Pro Tools operating
- Jeong Eun-kyung – recording, digital editing
- Koo Jong-pil – mixing
- Tom Coyne – mastering

== Charts ==
=== Weekly charts ===
Chart (2016)	Peak position
Japan Hot 100 (Billboard)	28
South Korea (Gaon)	9
US World Digital Songs (Billboard)	3

=== Monthly charts ===
Chart (2016)	Peak position
South Korea (Gaon)	44

== Sales ==
Region	Sales
South Korea (Gaon)	242,162

== Release history ==
Release history for "Lightsaber"
Region	Date	Version	Format	Label
Various	November 11, 2015	Korean	Digital download; streaming	SM; KT Music
Various	December 10, 2015	Chinese	Digital download; streaming	SM; KT Music
Various	December 17, 2015	Japanese	Digital download; streaming	Avex Trax
