= Love Me Right (song) =

2015 single by Exo

- Japanese digital and CD+DVD version cover artwork

Single by Exo

from the album Love Me Right & Countdown
- Language: Korean; Mandarin; Japanese
- Released: June 3, 2015
- Recorded: 2015
- Studio: SM Blue Cup (Seoul)
- Genre: Electronic; pop; R&B
- Length: 3:25
- Label: SM; KT Music; Avex Trax
- Composers: Ryan S. Jhun; Peter Tambakis; Denzil "DR" Remedios; Courtney Jenaé Stahl; Nermin Harambašić
- Lyricists: Oh Yoo-won; Kim Dong-hyun; Lin Xinye (ZH); Sara Sakurai (JP)

Exo Korean and Chinese singles chronology
"Call Me Baby" (2015)	"Love Me Right" (2015)	"Lightsaber" (2015)

Exo Japanese singles chronology
"Love Me Right (Romantic Universe)" (2015)	"Coming Over" (2016)

Music videos
- "Love Me Right" (Korean version) on YouTube
- "Love Me Right" (Chinese version) on YouTube
- "Love Me Right" (Romantic Universe) on YouTube

"Love Me Right" is a song by South Korean–Chinese boy band Exo, released on June 3, 2015, for the repackaged edition of their second studio album Love Me Right. It was released in Korean and Chinese versions by their label SM Entertainment. A Japanese version of the song, titled "Love Me Right (Romantic Universe)", was released as Exo's debut single in Japan by Avex Trax on November 4, 2015.

== Release and promotion ==
Following member Tao's withdrawal from group activities, Exo continued with the nine-member line-up by releasing a repackaged edition of their second studio album Exodus. "Love Me Right" served as the titular single and was released together with its music videos on June 3, 2015. The group began performing the song on South Korean TV music shows on June 4, 2015. They also added the song to the setlist of their second headlining tour The Exo'luxion starting from the Taipei show on June 12, 2015.

=== Japanese version ===
On August 30, 2015, Exo was announced to be releasing their debut single in Japan on November 4. The single was later revealed to be a Japanese version of "Love Me Right", re-titled "Love Me Right (Romantic Universe)". On the day of its release, the single sold a total of 147,000 copies and reached the top of the Oricon chart, becoming the best selling debut single in Japan by a Korean artist of all time. The single was later released in South Korea on November 18, 2015.

== Reception ==
"Love Me Right" topped South Korea's Gaon Digital Chart, becoming Exo's second domestic number one, and reached number 3 on the Billboard World Digital Songs chart. The song went on to win first place 11 times in total on South Korean music TV shows. Dazed magazine named it the 3rd best K-pop track of 2015.

== Awards and nominations ==
Music program awards
Program	Date
Show Champion	June 10, 2015
Show Champion	June 17, 2015
Show Champion	June 24, 2015
Music Bank	June 12, 2015
Music Bank	June 19, 2015
Show! Music Core	June 13, 2015
Show! Music Core	June 20, 2015
Show! Music Core	June 27, 2015
The Show	June 16, 2015
M Countdown	June 18, 2015
Inkigayo	June 21, 2015

== Track listing ==
No.	Title	Lyrics	Music	Length
1.	"Love Me Right (Romantic Universe)"	Oh Yoo-won, Kim Dong-hyun, Sara Sakurai	Denzil "DR" Remedios, Courtney Jenaé Stahl, Nermin Harambašić	3:29
2.	"Drop That"	MQ (BeatBurger), Jae Shim (BeatBurger), Hidenori Tanaka (agehasprings)	Shaun, Jae Shim (BeatBurger), Andreas Öberg, Maria Marcus	3:34
3.	"Love Me Right (Romantic Universe)" (Less Vocal)		Denzil "DR" Remedios, Courtney Jenaé Stahl, Nermin Harambašić	3:29
4.	"Drop That" (Less Vocal)		Shaun, Jae Shim (BeatBurger), Andreas Öberg, Maria Marcus	3:34
Total length:				14:06

== Charts ==
=== Weekly charts ===
Chart (2015)	Peak position
Korean version
South Korea (Gaon)	1
US World Digital Songs (Billboard)	3
Japan (Japan Hot 100)	33
Japanese version
Japan (Oricon)	1
Japan (Japan Hot 100)	1

=== Year-end charts ===
Chart (2015)	Position
South Korea (Gaon)	40

== Sales ==
Region	Sales
Korean version
South Korea (Gaon)	1,142,627
United States (Nielsen)	34,000
Japanese version
Japan (Oricon)	195,622
South Korea (Gaon)	11,469

== Certifications ==
Region	Certification	Certified units/sales
Japan (RIAJ)	Platinum	250,000^{^}
^{^} Shipments figures based on certification alone.

== Release history ==
Region	Date	Format	Label
Korean and Chinese versions
Various	June 3, 2015	Digital download; streaming	SM; KT Music
Japanese version
Japan	November 4, 2015	CD; DVD	Avex Trax
Various	November 4, 2015	Digital download; streaming	Avex Trax
South Korea	November 18, 2015	CD; digital download; streaming	Avex Trax
