= Electric Kiss =

Single by Exo

from the album Countdown
- Language: Japanese
- Released: January 31, 2018
- Recorded: 2017
- Studio: InGrid (Seoul)
- Genre: J-pop
- Length: 3:27
- Label: Avex Trax
- Composer(s): Obi Mhondera; Kyler Niko; Evan Berard
- Lyricist(s): Junji Ishiwatari
- Producer(s): Evan Berard

EXO singles chronology
"Universe" (2017)	"Electric Kiss" (2018)	"Tempo" (2018)

Music video
- "Electric Kiss" on YouTube

"Electric Kiss" is a song by South Korean–Chinese boy band Exo, released on January 31, 2018, as the lead single of their first Japanese album Countdown.

== Release and composition ==
Tamar Hermann from Billboard described "Electric Kiss" as a song with "thumping beats and funky synths [that] propel the single's melody, laying out a tempo-jumping playground for Exo's vocals and raps as the track builds into its propulsive chorus". The song was released on January 31 with the album.

== Music video ==
A short version of the "Electric Kiss" music video was released on December 5, 2017 by SM Entertainment. The accompanying dance practice video was released on January 12, 2018. It features Exo trapped in mirrored rooms and glass tanks, sitting on piles of discarded objects or roaming empty buildings.

The music video was broadcast on the big screen of Yunika Vision at Seibu Shinjuku Station from January 29 until February 4, 2018.

== Promotion ==
Exo performed "Electric Kiss" for the first time on January 26, 2018 on the Japanese morning TV show Sukkiri. On January 27 and 28, Exo performed "Electric Kiss" during their tour Exo Planet #4 – The ElyXion in Saitama.

== Charts ==
Chart (2018)	Peak position
Japan (Japan Hot 100)	23
South Korean International (Gaon)	68
US World Digital Songs (Billboard)	5

== Release history ==
Region	Date	Format	Label
Japan	January 31, 2018	Digital download; streaming	Avex Trax
Various	January 31, 2018	Digital download; streaming	Avex Trax
South Korea	February 14, 2018	Digital download; streaming	SM
