= Power (Exo song) =

2017 single by Exo

- Remixes EP cover

Single by Exo

from the album The War: The Power of Music
- Language: Korean; Mandarin
- Released: September 5, 2017
- Recorded: 2017
- Studio: SM Blue Cup (Seoul); MonoTree (Seoul)
- Genre: K-pop; big room house; complextro
- Length: 3:42
- Label: SM; Genie
- Composers: James 'Boy Matthews' Norton; Greg Bonnick; Hayden Chapman
- Lyricists: JQ; Kim Hye-jung; Wu Yiwei
- Producer: LDN Noise

Exo singles chronology
"Ko Ko Bop" (2017)	"Power" (2017)	"Universe" (2017)

Music video
- "Power" (Korean Ver.) on YouTube "Power" (Chinese Ver.) on YouTube

"Power" is a song by South Korean–Chinese boy band Exo, released on September 5, 2017, for the repackaged edition of their fourth studio album The War: The Power of Music. It was released in Korean and Chinese by their label SM Entertainment. On October 20, four remixes of the song were released through SM Station.

== Background and release ==
Produced by LDN Noise, "Power" is described as an EDM song featuring dynamic synthesizer sounds and drum beats. The lyrics talk about how one can become stronger through music that unites everyone into one. The song was released on September 5 together with the repackage album.

On October 18, it was revealed that four remix versions of the song by DJs R3hab, Dash Berlin, Imlay and Shaun will be released through SM Station on October 20. The remixes were digitally released on October 20.

== Commercial performance ==
The song debuted at number two on the Gaon Digital Chart as well as number 3 on Billboard's US World Digital Songs. On September 14, Exo's song "Power" recorded the highest score of all time on M Countdown with 11,000 points, making Exo the first artist to achieve a perfect score after the system changes were implemented in June 2015. The win also marked their 100th win on music shows.

== Music video ==
A teaser of "Power" music video was released on September 4, 2017. The Korean and Chinese music videos of "Power" were released on September 5. The music video begins with a narration explaining Exo's new world along with past released Exo songs, then turns into a video game–esque foreign planet where Exo members fight the Red Force machine (their opponent) to get the orbs of their superpowers back which were officially assigned to them early in their careers. Macrograph, the local VFX studio responsible for visual effects in blockbuster films like "Roaring Currents" and "Northern Limit Line," handled the video's visual effects.

The Korean music video hit one million views in its first three hours of release and 6,605,588 in 24 hours. Ten days after its release, the music video hit one million likes. The Korean music video has over 100 million views on YouTube.

== Promotion ==
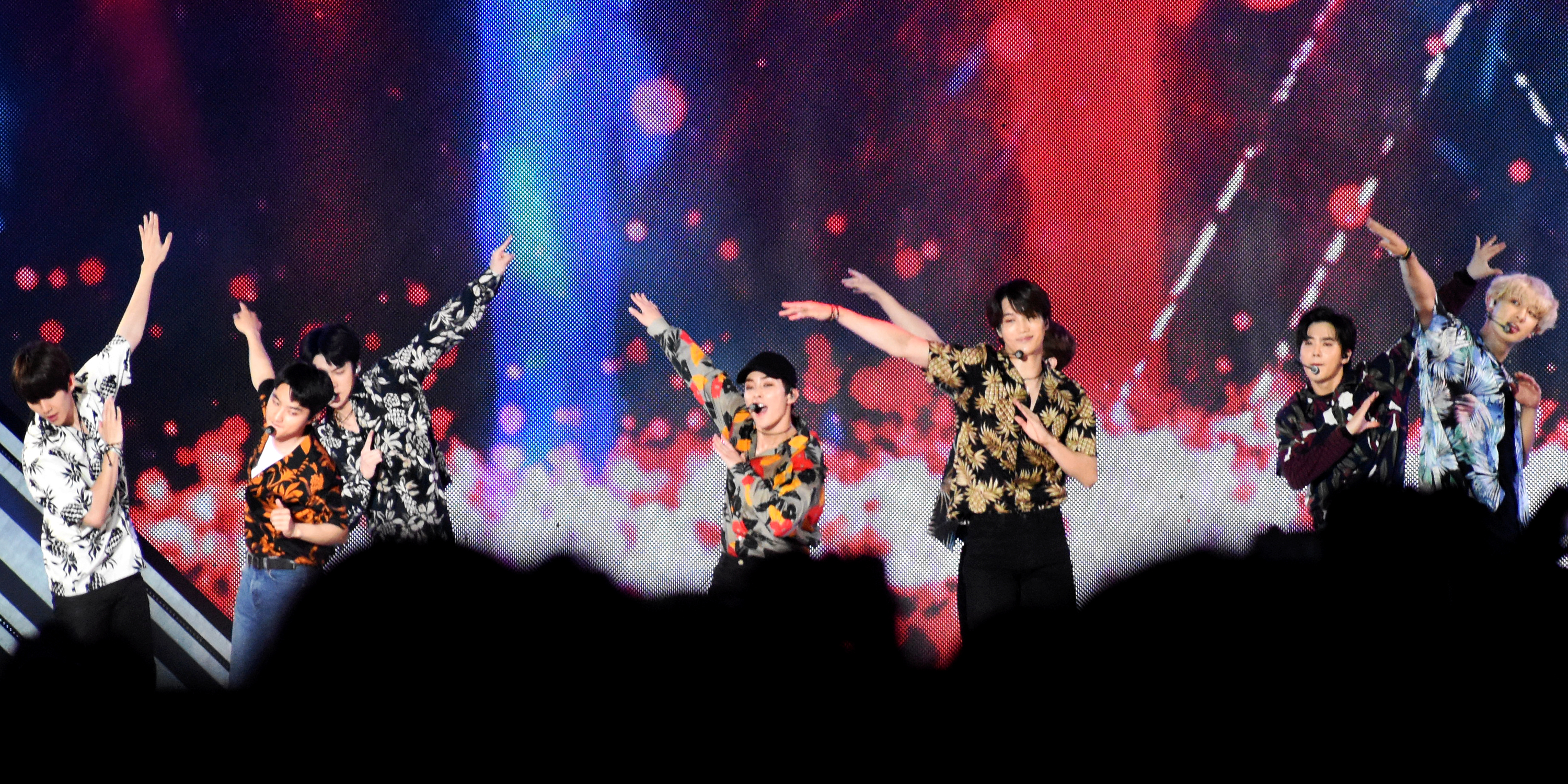
Exo performing "Power" at the 2018 Incheon Airport Sky Festival

SM Entertainment began promoting the repackaged album and "Power" by releasing teasers with the message "The Power of Music". The first teaser titled #Total_Eclipse was released on August 21, 2017, at the same time as when the solar eclipse of August 21, 2017 happened. The second teaser was released on August 28 titled #Parallel_Universe. The third teaser titled "Power #RF_05" was released on August 30.

On the same day, the title of the repackaged album was revealed to be The War: The Power of Music and that it will be released on September 5, 2017, with 12 tracks including the title track "Power". SM started releasing teaser images of each member from August 30. On September 6, Exo held a mini fan meeting where they performed "Power" for the first time. Exo began promoting "Power" on South Korean Music shows on September 7.

=== FIFA World Cup 2018 final ===
On 4 July 2018, the official FIFA World Cup Twitter posted a tweet asking fans which song they would like heard inside the Luzhniki Stadium in Moscow during the 2018 FIFA World Cup final. "Power" was among the options, and after a day of intense voting, the song narrowly beat BTS' "Fake Love". 'FIFA World Cup' announced "Power" was chosen to play on the day of the final match. "Power" was one of the songs played at the stadium during the pre-game, before the national teams entered the field for the match.

== Live performances ==
=== Dubai Fountain Show ===
Exo's "Power" was chosen as the first Korean song to be played at the Dubai Fountain's repertoire. whose current music repertoire includes mega-hit songs from global artists such as "Thriller" by Michael Jackson, "I Will Always Love You" by Whitney Houston, "Skyfall" by Adele and many more.

Exo commented, "We are delighted to introduce global audiences to our song 'Power' at this world-famous site. It is a true honour for our song to have been chosen as the first ever K-pop to be played by The Dubai Fountain; not only is 'Power' a dynamic song, but the lyrics describe how music can make people stronger by uniting us all. This ties in with the very essence of The Dubai Fountain itself, a place where visitors from all around the world gather together in one spot to enjoy the truly spectacular fountain show". Before the premiere on January 18, 2018, Exo held a fan meeting and a press conference in Dubai.

=== 2018 Winter Olympics ===
On February 25, Exo performed "Power" after "Growl" at the 2018 Winter Olympics closing ceremony at Pyeongchang Olympic Stadium in Pyeongchang, South Korea as part of the program's K-pop segment. The song's sales increased by 1,000 copies in the US and it returned to Billboard's World Digital Songs chart.

== Accolades ==
Awards
Year	Organization	Award	Result
2017	Mnet Asian Music Awards	Best Music Video	Nominated

Music program awards
Program	Date
Show Champion	September 13, 2017
M Countdown	September 14, 2017
Music Bank	September 15, 2017
Music Bank	September 22, 2017
Inkigayo	September 17, 2017

== Track listing ==
Remixes EP
No.	Title	Length
1.	"Power" (R3HAB Remix)	3:21
2.	"Power" (Dash Berlin Remix)	5:00
3.	"Power" (Imlay Remix)	3:18
4.	"Power" (Shaun Remix)	4:16
5.	"Power" (Dash Berlin Remix) (Chinese version)	5:00
Total length:		20:55

== Credits and personnel ==
Credits adapted from the album's liner notes.

=== Studio ===
- SM Blue Cup Studio – recording
- MonoTree Studio – recording, digital editing
- SM LVYIN Studio – digital editing
- SM Yellow Tail Studio – mixing
- Sterling Sound – mastering

=== Personnel ===
- SM Entertainment – executive producer
- Lee Soo-man – producer
- Yoo Young-jin – music and sound supervisor
- Exo – vocals
- JQ – lyrics
- Kim Hye-jung – lyrics
- Greg Bonnick (LDN Noise) – producer, composition, arrangement
- Hayden Chapman (LDN Noise) – producer, composition, arrangement
- James "Boy Matthews" Norton – composition, background vocals
- G-High – vocal directing, recording, Pro Tools operating, digital editing
- Onestar – background vocals
- Jung Eui-seok – recording
- Lee Ji-hong – digital editing
- Koo Jong-pil – mixing
- Chris Gehringer – mastering

== Charts ==
=== Weekly charts ===
Chart (2017)	Peak position
Japan (Japan Hot 100)	27
Philippines (Philippine Hot 100)	17
South Korea (K-pop Hot 100)	1
South Korea (Gaon)	2
US Hot Singles Sales (Billboard)	2
US World Digital Songs (Billboard)	3

=== Monthly chart ===
Chart (2017)	Peak position
South Korean (Gaon)	5

== Sales ==
Region	Sales
South Korea (Gaon)	333,157
Japan (Oricon)	4,033
United States (Nielsen)	9,000

== Release history ==
Region	Date	Format	Version	Label
South Korea	September 5, 2017	Digital download; streaming	Original	SM; Genie
Various	September 5, 2017	Digital download; streaming	Original	SM
Various	October 20, 2017	Digital download; streaming	Remixes	SM; ScreaM; Genie
