= Ko Ko Bop =

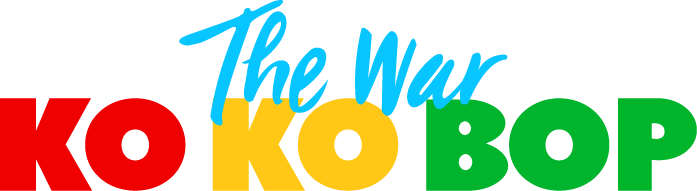
- Title logo used in the music video

Single by Exo

from the album The War
- Language: Korean; Mandarin
- Released: July 18, 2017
- Recorded: 2017
- Studio: SM LVYIN (Seoul); Doobdoob (Seoul); Sound Pool (Seoul)
- Genre: Reggae fusion
- Length: 3:10
- Label: SM; Genie
- Composers: Tay Jasper; Shaylen Carroll; Styalz Fuego; MZMC
- Lyricists: Kim Jong-dae; Park Chan-yeol; Byun Baek-hyun; JQ; Hyun Ji-won; Arys Chien
- Producer: Styalz Fuego

Exo singles chronology
"For Life" (2016)	"Ko Ko Bop" (2017)	"Power" (2017)

Music video
- "Ko Ko Bop" (Korean Ver.) on YouTube
- "Ko Ko Bop" (Chinese Ver.) on YouTube

"Ko Ko Bop" is a song by South Korean–Chinese boy band Exo, released on July 18, 2017, as the lead single of their fourth studio album The War. It was released in Korean and Chinese versions by their label SM Entertainment. It was the first Exo single not to feature member Lay due to his extended hiatus.

== Release and composition ==
Produced by Styalz Fuego, "Ko Ko Bop" is described as an energetic reggae song with rhythmical reggae and bass guitar sounds. "Ko Ko Bop" was co-written by Exo members Chen, Chanyeol and Baekhyun. It was released digitally on July 18, 2017 and physically on July 19 along with the album. According to Chanyeol, the term "Ko Ko Bop" means "Fun Dancing".

Talking to Billboard about producing the song, Styalz Fuego stated that while writing the song the other composers were going with a reggae type of song, but after adding the drop after the chorus the song took a different distraction, and they settled for a reggae-pop song afterwards. The composers stated that they thought the song would be for a girl group because Shaylen Carroll, one of the composers, a female, did the demo, but eventually it went to Exo. Fuego stated "The song was actually in a higher key – I think three semitones higher – so it was more fitted for a female group originally."

About writing the lyrics of the song, Carroll stated: "When I was recording some melody ideas I kept on singing nonsense phrases and one was 'Shimmy shimmy Ko Ko Bop', (Note: The lyrics "shimmy shimmy Ko Ko Bop" were previously used in the 1959 hit song "Shimmy Shimmy Ko-Ko-Bop" by Little Anthony and The Imperials and the 1956 song "(Shimmy Shimmy) Ko Ko Wop” by El Capris.) which we all thought was super quirky and catchy. So we built off that and turned it into something real". Carroll went and described the "Ko Ko Bop" as a song that is about "not worrying about things", "going with the flow" and "not worrying about the haters". Chen and Baekhyun also talked with Billboard about writing the lyrics of the song, Chen stated that the Baekhyun, Chanyeol and himself each wrote the lyrics separately and worked on putting the lyrics together for the song afterwards by selecting the lyrics that would suit the song the best. Baekhyun stated "I wanted my lyrics to have people to become more carefree, release their stress and dance away with the music."

== Reception ==
=== Commercial performance ===
"Ko Ko Bop" topped the Gaon Digital Chart for four non-consecutive weeks, making Exo the first artist to do so in 2017. Exo also became the third idol group to chart at number one for four weeks, as well as the first male idol group to do so. The song also stayed at number two on Billboard's US World Digital Songs and China V Chart. For the month of August, "Ko Ko Bop" topped the Gaon Monthly Digital Chart. Upon the song's release, it was reported that Melon's servers crashed, due to the number of fans streaming at the same time.

=== Public reception ===
Exo's fans began a viral Internet video trend called Ko Ko Bop Challenge where people dance the quick hip thrust succession choreography of the song to the lyrics "Down down baby". The hashtag #KoKoBopChallenge was used for popular social media platforms such as Twitter, Instagram and Weibo.

== Music video ==
A teaser of "Ko Ko Bop" music video was released on July 17, 2017 by SM Entertainment. The Korean and Chinese music videos of "Ko Ko Bop" were released on July 18. The music video was filmed in Seoul, South Korea.The music video shows the boys spending a day having fun as the name of the suggests "Ko Ko Bop" meaning fun dancing.

The Korean music video hit one million views in its first hour of release and 8,833,869 in 24 hours. Three days after its release, the music video hit one million likes; in August 2020, it reached four million likes. On December 12, 2017, the music video surpassed 100 million views on YouTube, reaching 200 million views on January 25, 2019, and 300 million on February 28, 2021.

== Promotion ==
On July 8, Exo's official Twitter account had been activated to public, through which SM Entertainment revealed the first teaser video for the album. Twitter Music also created three customized hashtags with Exo's new tropical logo for Exo including #KoKoBop, #TheWarEXO and #EXO. Fans also welcomed them with 11 million tweets worldwide. Also on July 8, Exo's official Instagram account opened by posting the three versions of Exo's new album logo. On July 10, the album's title was announced to be The War. From July 9 to July 16, the album's track list was revealed one by one through a series of teaser videos each featuring one member.

Exo began promoting "Ko Ko Bop" on South Korean music shows from July 20. On August 5, Exo performed "Ko Ko Bop" in Hong Kong during the SM Town Live World Tour VI concert. Exo also performed at a-Nation on August 26, Music Bank World Tour in Jakarta on September 2 and during Lotte Duty Free Family Festival on September 15.

== Accolades ==
"Ko Ko Bop" won 11 first place awards on music programs in South Korea. It was named amongst the best K-pop songs of 2017 by several publications including Dazed (3rd), Billboard (20th), and Idolator (25th), and was ranked the 9th most viewed K-pop music video of the year by YouTube Rewind.

Awards and nominations for "Ko Ko Bop"
Year	Organization	Award	Result	Ref.
2017	Mnet Asian Music Awards	Song of the Year	Nominated	
2017	Mnet Asian Music Awards	Best Dance Performance – Male Group	Nominated	
2017	Mnet Asian Music Awards	Mwave Global Fans' Choice	Won	
2017	Melon Music Awards	Song of the Year	Nominated	
2017	Melon Music Awards	Best Male Dance	Won	
2018	Gaon Chart Music Awards	Song of the Year – July	Won	

Music program awards
Program	Date	Ref.
Show Champion	July 26, 2017	
Show Champion	August 2, 2017	
M Countdown	July 27, 2017	
M Countdown	August 3, 2017	
M Countdown	August 10, 2017	
Music Bank	July 28, 2017	
Music Bank	August 4, 2017	
Inkigayo	July 30, 2017	
Inkigayo	August 6, 2017	
Show! Music Core	August 5, 2017	
Show! Music Core	August 12, 2017	

== Credits and personnel ==
Credits adapted from the album's liner notes.

=== Studio ===
- SM LVYIN Studio – recording
- doobdoob Studio – recording
- Sound Pool Studio – recording, digital editing
- SM Big Shot Studio – digital editing
- SM Concert Hall Studio – mixing
- Sterling Sound – mastering

=== Personnel ===
- SM Entertainment – executive producer
- Lee Soo-man – producer
- Yoo Young-jin – music and sound supervisor
- Exo – vocals
  - Baekhyun – Korean lyrics
  - Chen – Korean lyrics
  - Chanyeol – Korean lyrics
- JQ – Korean lyrics
- Hyun Ji-won (makeumine works) – Korean lyrics
- Arys Chien – Chinese lyrics
- Styalz Fuego – producer, composition, arrangement
- Shaylen Carroll – composition, background vocals
- Jeremy "Tay" Jasper – composition, background vocals
- MZMC – composition
- MQ – vocal directing
- Ju Chan-yang – vocal directing, background vocals
- Lee Ji-hong – recording
- Ahn Chang-kyu – recording
- Jeong Ho-jin – recording, digital editing
- On Seong-yoon – recording
- Min Sung-soo – recording assistant
- Lee Min-kyu – digital editing
- Nam Koong-jin – mixing
- Chris Gehringer – mastering

== Charts ==
=== Weekly charts ===
Chart (2017)	Peak position
Japan (Japan Hot 100)	39
Philippines (Philippine Hot 100)	32
South Korea (K-pop Hot 100)	1
South Korea (Gaon)	1
US World Digital Songs (Billboard)	2

=== Monthly chart ===
Chart (2017)	Peak position
South Korea (Gaon)	1

=== Yearly chart ===
Chart (2017)	Peak position
South Korea (Gaon)	14
US World Digital Chart (Billboard)	20

== Sales ==
Region	Sales (2017)	
Region	Korean ver.	Chinese ver.
South Korea (digital)	1,172,609	13,884

== Release history ==
Region	Date	Format	Label
South Korea	July 18, 2017	Digital download; streaming	SM; Genie
Various	July 18, 2017	Digital download; streaming	SM
