= Sing for You (song) =

Single by Exo

from the EP Sing for You
- Language: Korean; Mandarin
- Released: December 10, 2015
- Recorded: 2015
- Studio: Doobdoob (Seoul); In Grid (Seoul); Seoul
- Genre: K-pop
- Length: 3:55
- Label: SM; KT Music
- Composers: Matthew Tishler; Aaron Benward; Felicia Barton
- Lyricists: Kenzie (KR); Zhou Weijie (ZH)
- Producer: Kenzie

Exo singles chronology
"Lightsaber" (2015)	"Sing for You" (2015)	"Unfair" (2015)

Music video
- "Sing for You (Korean ver.)" on YouTube "Sing for You (Chinese ver.)" on YouTube

"Sing for You" is a song by South Korean–Chinese boy band Exo, released on December 10, 2015, as the lead single of their fourth extended play Sing for You. It was released in both Korean and Chinese versions by their label SM Entertainment.

== Background and release ==
Produced by Kenzie, "Sing for You" has been described as a "hushed, acoustic ballad". A teaser music video was released on November 8. The single, EP, and related music videos were released on December 10.

== Music video ==
The Korean and Chinese music videos for "Sing for You" were released on December 10, 2015. The Korean music video has over 34 million views on YouTube.

== Promotion ==
EXO began performing "Sing for You" on Korean music shows on December 12, 2015.

== Reception ==
"Sing for You" peaked at number 3 on the Gaon Digital Chart.

== Credits ==
Credits adapted from the EP's liner notes.

Studio

- Doobdoob Studio – recording
- In Grid Studio – recording
- Seoul Studio – recording
- SM Yellow Tail Studio – mixing
- Sterling Sound – mastering

Personnel

- SM Entertainment – executive producer
- Lee Soo-man – producer
- Kim Young-min – executive supervisor
- Exo – vocals
  - Chen – background vocals
- Kenzie – producer, Korean lyrics, arrangement
- Zhou Weijie – Chinese lyrics
- Matthew Tishler – composition
- Felicia Barton – composition
- Aaron Benward – composition
- Seo Mi-rae – vocal directing, background vocals, Pro Tools operating, digital editing
- Hong Jun-ho – guitar
- Jang Woo-young – recording
- Kim Hyun-gon – recording
- Jeong Eun-kyung – recording
- Jeong Ki-hong – recording
- Ji Yong-joo – recording
- Koo Jong-pil – mixing
- Tom Coyne – mastering

== Charts ==
=== Weekly charts ===
Chart (2016)	Peak position
South Korea (Gaon)	3
China (Billboard)	4

=== Monthly charts ===
Chart (2016)	Peak position
South Korea (Gaon)	10

== Sales ==
Region	Sales
South Korea (Gaon)	710,424

== Accolades ==
=== Music program awards ===
Program	Date
Music Bank	December 18, 2015
Music Bank	December 25, 2015
Music Bank	January 1, 2016

== Release history ==
Release history for "Sing for You"
Region	Date	Format	Label
Various	December 10, 2015	Digital download; streaming	SM; KT Music
