= Call Me Baby =

2015 single by Exo

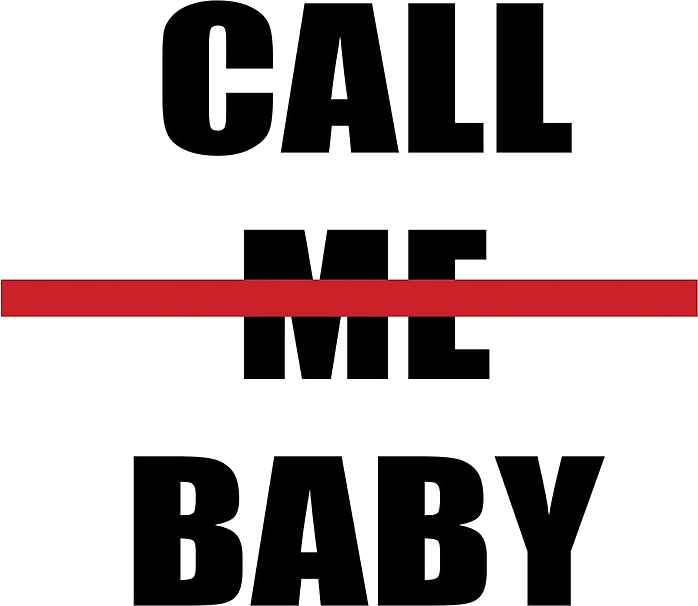
- Call Me Baby

Single by Exo

from the album Exodus
- Language: Korean; Mandarin
- Released: March 27, 2015
- Studio: SM Blue Cup (Seoul)
- Genre: K-pop
- Length: 3:32
- Label: SM; KT Music
- Composers: Teddy Riley; DOM; Lee Hyun-seung; Jason J. Lopez; Dantae Johnson
- Lyricists: Jo Yoon-kyung; January 8th (Jam Factory); Kim Dong-hyun
- Producers: Teddy Riley; J.SOL; Dantae Johnson

Exo singles chronology
"December, 2014 (The Winter's Tale)" (2014)	"Call Me Baby" (2015)	"Love Me Right" (2015)

Music videos
- "Call Me Baby" (Korean version) on YouTube
- "Call Me Baby" (Chinese version) on YouTube

"Call Me Baby" is a song recorded by South Korean–Chinese boy band Exo, as the lead single of their second studio album Exodus. It was released on March 27, 2015, through SM Entertainment, in both Korean and Chinese.

The song peaked at number two on South Korea's Gaon Digital Chart, and Billboard's World Digital Songs chart in the United States. Its entry at number 98 on the Canadian Hot 100, made Exo the only K-pop act other than Psy to rank on the charts in that territory at the time. "Call Me Baby" ended 2015 as the seventh best-performing song overall in South Korea, and Billboard ranked it as the ninth best K-pop song of the year.

By September 2016, "Call Me Baby" had sold over 1.2 million copies domestically. In 2019, Billboard included it on its list of the 100 greatest K-pop songs of the 2010s, at number 12.

== Release and promotion ==
To promote the release of Exodus, a series of videos referred to as "Pathcode", featuring one Exo member each and are set in various locations, were released on YouTube. The first letters of these locations' names—Colorado, Arizona, London, Lyon, Marseille, Edinburgh, Barcelona, Almaty, Berlin and Yunnan—would spell "Call Me Baby", the title of the album's lead single. It was released digitally on March 27, 2015, three days ahead of the album. Exo began performing the song on South Korean music TV shows on April 2, 2015. After the press conference for the album's release, member Tao was absent from promotional activities and would later withdraw from the group, making "Call Me Baby" the last Exo single he participated in.

== Music video ==
The Korean and Chinese music videos for "Call Me Baby" were released on March 30, 2015. The videos mainly feature Exo's performances of the song at a warehouse setting and against a white backdrop, and were filmed in a one shot style. The Korean version later became the third most-watched K-pop music video on YouTube in 2015. On September 23, 2018, the Korean music video surpassed 200 million views on YouTube, becoming their second music video to do so.

== Reception ==
Writing for Billboard, Jeff Benjamin commented that while "Call Me Baby" "sounds wholly inspired by the late '90s/early '00s sound", Exo "is not only bringing in the nostalgic feel, but doing it at a 200 percent intensity." The song reached number two on both South Korea's Gaon Digital Chart and the Billboard World Digital Songs chart. It also entered the Canadian Hot 100 at number 98, making Exo the second South Korean artist, after Psy, to appear on the chart. "Call Me Baby" went on to win first place 18 times in total on South Korean music TV shows for the entire month, and the all-time second highest number of wins. Billboard ranked the song at number 9 on their list of top 20 K-pop songs of 2015.

== Accolades ==
Billboard ranked "Call Me Baby" number 9 in their list of the 20 Best K-pop Songs of 2015 and number 12 on their list of The 100 Greatest K-Pop Songs of the 2010s, calling it a "sartorially adventurous in letting each member’s personality shine through". SBS PopAsia also included it in their lists of the best K-pop songs from 2014 to 2016.

Music program awards (18 total)
Program	Date	Ref.
Inkigayo	April 5, 2015	
Inkigayo	April 12, 2015	
Inkigayo	April 26, 2015	
Show Champion	April 8, 2015	
Show Champion	April 15, 2015	
Show Champion	April 22, 2015	
M Countdown	April 9, 2015	
M Countdown	April 16, 2015	
M Countdown	April 30, 2015	
Music Bank	April 3, 2015	
Music Bank	April 10, 2015	
Music Bank	April 24, 2015	
Music Bank	May 1, 2015	
Show! Music Core	April 11,2015	
Show! Music Core	April 18, 2015	
Show! Music Core	April 25, 2015	
Show! Music Core	May 2, 2015	
The Show	April 28, 2015	

== Credits and personnel ==
Credits are adapted from album liner notes.

- Exo – vocals
  - Xiumin – background vocals
  - Baekhyun – background vocals
  - Chen – background vocals
  - D.O. – background vocals
- Jo Yoon-kyung – songwriting
- January 8th – songwriting
- Kim Dong-hyun – songwriting
- Teddy Riley – songwriting, production
- DOM – songwriting
- Lee Hyun-seung – songwriting, background vocals
- Jason J. "J.SOL" Lopez – songwriting, production, background vocals
- Dantae Johnson – songwriting, production, background vocals
- MQ – vocal directing
- Maxx Song – vocal directing, recording, Pro Tools operating, editing
- Jung Eui-seok – recording
- Lee Ji-hong – editing
- Nam Koong-jin – mixing
- Tom Coyne – mastering

== Charts ==
=== Weekly charts ===
Chart (2015)	Peak position
Canada (Canadian Hot 100)	98
South Korea (Gaon)	2
UK Indie Breakers (OCC)	18
US World Digital Songs (Billboard)	2

=== Year-end charts ===
Chart (2015)	Position
South Korea (Gaon)	7
US World Digital Songs (Billboard)	14

== Sales ==
Region	Sales
South Korea (Gaon)	1,229,566
United States (Nielsen)	56,000
Canada (Music Canada)	200

== Release history ==
Release date and format for "Call Me Baby"
Region	Date	Format	Label
Various	March 27, 2015	Digital download; streaming	SM; KT Music
