= For Life (Exo song) =

Single by Exo

from the EP For Life
- Language: Korean; Mandarin
- Released: December 19, 2016
- Recorded: 2016
- Studio: SM Blue Ocean (Seoul)
- Genre: K-pop
- Length: 3:58
- Label: SM; KT Music
- Composers: Kenzie; Matthew Tishler; Aaron Benward
- Lyricist: Kenzie
- Producers: Kenzie; Matthew Tishler; Aaron Benward

EXO singles chronology
"Dancing King" (2016)	"For Life" (2016)	"Ko Ko Bop" (2017)

Music video
- "For Life" (Korean Ver.) on YouTube "For Life" (Chinese Ver.) on YouTube

"For Life" is a song by South Korean–Chinese boy band Exo, released on December 19, 2016, as the lead single of their fifth extended play For Life. It was released in both Korean and Chinese by their label SM. This was the last single released before member Lay's extended hiatus.

== Background and release ==
Produced by Kenzie, Matthew Tishler and Aaron Benward, "For Life" is described as a "slow ballad" with a sweet piano melody and a beautiful string accompaniment, with lyrics that are about looking at one person for the rest of one's life.

== Music video ==
The Korean and Chinese music videos for "For Life" were released on December 19, 2016. The Korean music video has over 30 million views on Youtube.

== Accolades ==
Music program awards
Program	Date
Music Bank	December 30, 2016

== Charts ==
=== Weekly charts ===
Chart (2016)	Peak position
South Korea (Gaon)	7
China (Billboard)	6
US World Digital Songs (Billboard)	8

=== Monthly charts ===
Chart (2016)	Peak position
South Korea (Gaon)	39

== Sales ==
Region	Sales
South Korea (Gaon)	215,231

== Release history ==
Release history for "For Life"
Region	Date	Format	Label
Various	December 19, 2016	Digital download; streaming	SM; KT Music
