= Fair (disambiguation) =

Fair is a type of market, or fête.

Fair or FAIR (acronym) may also refer to:

== As an acronym ==
- Factor analysis of information risk, a framework for understanding, analyzing, and measuring information risks by the company Risk Management Insight
- FAIR data, data which meet standards of findability, accessibility, interoperability and reusability
- First article inspection report, a formal method of providing a measurement report for a given manufacturing process

=== Germany ===
- Facility for Antiproton and Ion Research, an international accelerator facility for the research using antiprotons and ions

=== United Kingdom ===
- Families Acting for Innocent Relatives, in Northern Ireland
- Family Action Information Resource, a British anti-cult group, reorganized as The Family Survival Trust
- Forum Against Islamophobia and Racism

=== United States ===
- Facebook Artificial Intelligence Research, now called Meta AI
- Fairness and Accuracy in Reporting, a progressive media criticism organization based in New York City
- Federation for American Immigration Reform
- Forum for Academic and Institutional Rights
- Foundation Against Intolerance and Racism
- FAIR (Mormon apologetics organization), formerly known as FairMormon and the Foundation for Apologetic Information & Research

== Other uses ==
- Trade fair, or expo, a trade show
- Fair, a level in coin grading
- Fair, hair color of a fair haired (blonde) person
- Fair (band), a music group
- "Fair" (song), a 2022 song by Normani
- Fair ball, in baseball, a batted ball which is in play
- Fair Isle, a Scottish island

== See also ==
- The Fair (disambiguation)
- Fairness (disambiguation)
- Fairing (disambiguation)
- Fairs (surname)
- Unfair (disambiguation)
