= Exo Planet 2 – The Exo'luxion =

2015–16 concert tour by Exo

Exo Planet #2 – The Exo'luxion
- World tour by Exo
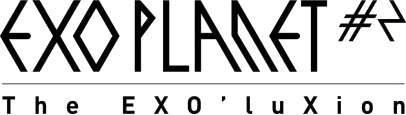
- Associated album: Exodus; Love Me Right; Sing For You
- Start date: March 7, 2015
- End date: March 20, 2016
- No. of shows: 44
- Website: exo.smtown.com

Exo concert chronology
- Exo from Exoplanet #1 – The Lost Planet (2014); Exo Planet #2 – The EXO'luXion (2015-16); Exo Planet #3 – The EXO'rDIUM (2016-17)

Exo Planet #2 – The Exo'luxion (stylized as EXO PLANET #2 - The EXO'luXion) was the second tour of South Korean-Chinese boy band Exo. The tour began in Seoul's Olympic Gymnastics Arena on March 7, 2015. The tour was officially announced in January 2015 with the first five dates in South Korea. The tour had 39 dates throughout Asia and five dates in North America.

On August 24, 2015, member Tao filed a lawsuit against SM Entertainment and discontinued his participation in the Exo Planet #2 – The Exo'luxion tour as the remaining nine members continued the tour promotion without him.

== Concerts ==
=== South Korea ===
- The tour was officially announced by SM Entertainment on January 15, 2015, with four dates in Seoul at the Olympic Park Gymnastics Stadium better known as Olympic Gymnastics Arena and Olympic Gymnastics Hall.
- Tickets went on sale on January 21, 2015. Due to popular demand, a fifth show was added in Seoul for March 13, 2015.
- Following Exo's first Seoul concert on March 7, reports were released alleging that members Kai and Tao injured themselves while performing and were unable to participate in the remaining stage performances.

=== Taiwan ===
- On June 11, Exo traveled to Taiwan for their two-day concert event in light of the MERS concern in Korea. Exo took many precautions to prevent the potential spreading of MERS including wearing face masks and taking an alternative exit at the airport to avoid the crowd.
- Following Exo's two day stunt in Taiwan, many Taiwanese fans accused the security guards of sexual harassment. Fans claimed that the security guards acted inappropriately during bag checks, often including full body searches, as well as used excessive force to remove fans from the venue. Concert organizer, SuperDome, responded to the accusations by denying any wrongdoing.

=== China ===
- Following Exo's two day stunt in Beijing on July 18 & 19, fans became concerned for the members of Exo when photos surfaced showing a laser being pointed at the members' faces by some of the fans in the crowd. Some fans revealed that laser pointers can cause temporary visual problems and be visually distracting.
- While performing "Growl" at a December 12, 2015, show in Nanjing, member D.O. slid several times on a slippery stage surface. After almost falling, he quickly took off his shoes and finished the number in his socked feet. He then put on more slip-resistant shoes, and finished the show without further incident. Fan reviews praised his professionalism in carrying on as he did.

=== Philippines ===
- On December 5, netizens clamored that the ticket-selling was announced late, and caused an uproar. It was later announced that the ticket-selling was postponed to December 13, 2015, due to finalizing ticket prices and seat plans, though the concert will push through on the announced date. Upon the final release of tickets, all tickets were sold out within 3 hours.
- On December 19, 2015, due to high demand, a second concert was added to the tour for the Philippines. Exo became the first K-pop group to hold two consecutive concerts in the country.

=== North America ===
- On December 1, 2015, My Music Taste released a YouTube video in conjunction with Exo to announce that they would be coming to 5 cities in North America. The announcement included that the fans would get to vote on which 5 cities Exo came to via My Music Taste's official website. Fans had the opportunity to vote by using a free "Make" or by purchasing a "Taste" for US$10. The five cities with the most 'makes' and 'tastes', who reached the 'Green Stage', by the end of the contest would be selected as the winning cities.
- On December 7, 2015, following the end of the voting contest, My Music Taste made the official announcement that the winning 5 cities were New York City, Chicago, Dallas, Los Angeles, and Vancouver. Immediately following the announcement of the winning cities, fans from Atlanta and Toronto placed My Music Taste under the microscope by taking to social media to express their anger towards My Music Taste with accusations that the voting contest had been a scam. Fans heavily scrutinized the process stating that their investigations into the matter showed ‘fake accounts’ being responsible for the sudden spike in votes during the last few minutes of voting. Fans questioned the integrity of the voting process as they uncovered a large number of accounts that shared an ‘adjective-animal-number’ pattern in their usernames and some even shared the same profile picture. Fans attempted to reach out to My Music Taste during the voting process to inform them of the possibility of cheating in which My Music Taste replied to. In an official statement via their social media accounts, they stated that they were aware of the automated ‘tastes’ and ‘makes’ from these ‘fake accounts' but ultimately they had the right to make the final decision on which cities were selected based on the data that they collected from the top 10 cities. Fans from Atlanta and Toronto became certain that the voting contest was a scam after the tour dates for the winning 5 cities were announced only 10 minutes after the winning city announcements.
- On December 8, 2015, My Music Taste responded to the accusations via their official accounts denying any wrongdoing. They explained that the purpose of the 'tastes' were to show that fans were serious about bringing certain artists to their city. If the artist is able to come to a certain city because of voting, the fans who purchased a 'taste' would have received additional benefits such as early ticketing, signed merchandise, and rehearsal access. They announced that due to the overwhelming outrage from fans, they would be issuing refunds for all 'tastes' purchased through their website (even those purchased for other artists and concerts) and discontinuing any additional benefits that would have come with a 'taste' purchase.
- On December 24, 2015, Dream Maker Entertainment made an official statement stating that Lay would not be able to attend the 5 concerts in North America due to his activities in China.
- On February 9, 2016, My Music Taste made an official statement stating that Kai would not be able to attend the concert in Dallas due to a visa delay.
- After the conclusion of the North American leg of Exo's tour, My Music Taste was placed under the microscope again by angry Korean fans who accused them of sexual harassment and discrimination. According to posts circulating among Korean fan sites, Korean fans claimed that they were treated differently from non-Korean concertgoers by being singled out for harsh treatment by security including being strip searched, having their property seized, and being forcibly removed from the venues. My Music Taste responded to the accusations via their official accounts denying any wrongdoing again. They stated that they would investigate the claims and would pursue legal action against all false accusations.

== Set list ==
Seoul, South Korea

Opening VCR (The Exo'luxion)

- 중독 (Overdose) (Remix) (KR)
- History (Remix) (KR/CH)
- El Dorado (KR)

Ment

- 나비소녀 (Don't Go) (KR)
- Playboy (KR)
- 인어의 눈물 (Baby, Don't Cry) (KR) (Suho, Baekhyun, Chanyeol and D.O.) + Dance Break (Kai and Sehun)
- My Answer (KR) (Suho, Baekhyun and D.O.)

VCR #2 (My Turn to Cry)

- The Star (KR)
- Exodus (KR) + Dance Break (Lay)
- Hurt (KR)

VCR #3

- 피터팬 (Peter Pan) (KR)
- XOXO (KR)
- Lucky (KR)
- 3.6.5 (KR/CH)

Ment

- Christmas Day (KR)
- 첫 눈 (The First Snow) (KR)
- 12월의 기적 (Miracles in December) (KR) (Baekhyun, Chen and D.O.)

Ment

- Beat Burger Remix Medley (KR)
- Full Moon (KR)
- Machine (KR)
- Drop That (KR)
- Let Out the Beast (KR)
- Run (KR)

VCR #4 - VCR #5 - (Call Me Baby Preview)

- Dubstep (KR) (Day 3, 4, 5 only)
- 으르렁 (Growl) (Stage Version) (KR)
- 늑대와 미녀 (Wolf) (Stage Version) (KR)

Ment

- MAMA (KR/CH)

Encore VCR

- 약속 (EXO, 2014) (KR)

Ment

- Thunder (KR) (Day 3, 4, 5 only)
- 너의 세상으로 (Into Your World) (KR)
Bangkok, Thailand

Opening VCR (The Exo'luxion)

- 중독 (Overdose) (Remix) (KR)
- History (Remix) (KR/CH)
- El Dorado (KR)

Ment

- 나비소녀 (Don't Go) (KR)
- Playboy (KR)
- 인어의 눈물 (Baby, Don't Cry) (KR)
- My Answer (KR)

VCR #2 (My Turn to Cry)

- The Star (KR)
- Exodus (KR)
- Hurt (KR)

VCR #3

- 피터팬 (Peter Pan) (KR)
- XOXO (KR)
- Lucky (KR)
- 3.6.5 (KR/CH)

Ment

- Christmas Day (KR)
- 첫 눈 (First Snow) (KR)
- 12월의 기적 (Miracles in December) (CH)

Ment

- Full Moon (KR)
- Machine (Remix) (KR)
- Drop That (KR)
- Let Out the Beast (Remix) (KR)
- Run (Remix) (KR)
- Call Me Baby (KR)
- Love Me Right (KR)
- 으르렁 (Growl) (Stage Version) (CH)

Ment

- MAMA (KR/CH)

Encore VCR

- 약속 (EXO, 2014) (KR)

Ment

- 너의 세상으로 (Into Your World) (KR)
Pasay, Philippines

Opening VCR (The Exo'luxion)

- 중독 (Overdose) (Remix) (KR)
- History (Remix) (KR)
- El Dorado (KR)

Ment

- 나비소녀 (Don't Go) (KR)
- Playboy (KR)
- 인어의 눈물 (Baby, Don't Cry) (KR)
- My Answer (KR)

VCR #2 (My Turn to Cry)

- The Star (KR)
- Exodus (KR)

VCR #3

- 피터팬 (Peter Pan) (KR)
- XOXO (KR)
- Lucky (KR)
- 3.6.5 (KR)

Ment

- Christmas Day (KR)
- 첫 눈 (First Snow) (KR)
- 12월의 기적 (Miracles in December) (KR)

Ment

- Full Moon (KR)
- Machine (Remix) (KR)
- Drop That (KR)
- Let Out the Beast (Remix) (KR)
- Run (Remix) (KR)

VCR #4

- Call Me Baby
- 으르렁 (Growl) (Stage Version) (KR)

Ment

- Love Me Right (KR)

VCR #5

- Sing for You (KR)

'Ending Ment

- Unfair (KR)
China

Opening VCR (The Exo'luxion)

- 중독 (Overdose) (Remix) (KR)
- History (Remix) (KR/CH)
- El Dorado (KR)

Ment

- 나비소녀 (Don't Go) (KR)
- Playboy (KR)
- 인어의 눈물 (Baby, Don't Cry) (KR)
- My Answer (CH)

VCR #2 (My Turn to Cry)

- The Star (KR)
- Exodus (KR)
- Hurt (KR)

VCR #3

- 피터팬 (Peter Pan) (KR)
- XOXO (KR)
- Lucky (CH)
- 3.6.5 (KR/CH)

Ment

- Christmas Day (KR)
- 첫 눈 (First Snow) (KR)
- 12월의 기적 (Miracles in December) (CH)

Ment

- Full Moon (KR)
- Machine (Remix) (KR)
- Drop That (KR)
- Let Out the Beast (Remix) (KR)
- Run (Remix) (KR)
- Call Me Baby (CH)
- Dubstep (KR)(Macau, Nanjing, Dalian only)
- Love Me Right (CH)(not performed in Shanghai)
- 으르렁 (Growl) (Stage Version) (CH)
- 늑대와 미녀 (Wolf) (Stage Version) (KR)(Shanghai only)

Ment

- MAMA (KR/CH)(not performed in Nanjing, Dalian)

Encore VCR

- 약속 (EXO, 2014) (CH)(not performed in Dalian)
- Sing For You (KR)(Dalian only)

Ment

- 너의 세상으로 (Into Your World) (KR)(not performed in Dalian)
- Unfair (KR)(Dalian only)
United States & Canada

Opening VCR (The Exo'luxion)

- 중독 (Overdose) (KR)
- History (KR)
- MAMA (KR)

Ment

- 나비소녀 (Don't Go) (KR)
- Playboy (KR)
- 인어의 눈물 (Baby, Don't Cry) (KR)
- My Answer (KR)

VCR #2 (My Turn to Cry)

- The Star (KR)
- Exodus (KR)
- Hurt (KR)

VCR #3 (Coffee Shop)

- 피터팬 (Peter Pan) (KR)
- XOXO (KR)
- Lucky (KR)
- 3.6.5 (KR)

Ment

- Christmas Day (KR)
- 첫 눈 (First Snow) (KR)
- 12월의 기적 (Miracles in December) (KR)

Ment

- Full Moon (KR)
- Machine (KR)
- Drop That (KR)
- Let Out the Beast (KR)
- Run (KR)

VCR #4

- Call Me Baby (KR)
- Dubstep Intro (KR)
- 으르렁 (Growl) (KR)

Ment

- Love Me Right (KR)

VCR #5 (Promise)

- Sing For You (KR)

Ending Ment

- Unfair (KR)
Jakarta, Indonesia

Opening VCR (The Exo'luxion)

- 중독 (Overdose) (KR)
- History (KR)
- El Dorado (KR)

Ment

- 나비소녀 (Don't Go) (KR)
- Playboy (KR)
- 인어의 눈물 (Baby, Don't Cry) (KR)
- My Answer (KR)

VCR #2 (My Turn to Cry)

- The Star (KR)
- Exodus (KR)
- Hurt (KR)

VCR #3 (Coffee Shop)

- 피터팬 (Peter Pan) (KR)
- XOXO (KR)
- Lucky (KR)
- 3.6.5 (KR)

Ment

- Christmas Day (KR)
- 첫 눈 (First Snow) (KR)
- 12월의 기적 (Miracles in December) (KR)

Ment

- Full Moon (KR)
- Machine (KR)
- Drop That (KR)
- Let Out the Beast (KR)
- Run (KR)

VCR #4

- Call Me Baby (KR)
- Dubstep Intro (KR)
- 으르렁 (Growl) (KR)

Ment

- Love Me Right (KR)

VCR #5 (Promise)

- Sing For You (KR)

Ending Ment

- Unfair (KR)
Singapore

Opening VCR (The Exo'luxion)

- 중독 (Overdose) (KR)
- History (KR/CH)
- El Dorado (KR)

Ment

- 나비소녀 (Don't Go) (KR)
- Playboy (KR)
- 인어의 눈물 (Baby, Don't Cry) (KR)
- My Answer (KR)

VCR #2 (My Turn to Cry)

- The Star (KR)
- Exodus (KR)
- Hurt (KR)

VCR #3 (Coffee Shop)

- 피터팬 (Peter Pan) (KR)
- XOXO (KR)
- Lucky (CH)
- 3.6.5 (KR-CH-KR)

Ment

- Christmas Day (KR)
- 첫 눈 (First Snow) (KR)
- 12월의 기적 (Miracles in December) (CH)
- Full Moon (KR)
- Machine (Remix) (KR)
- Drop That (KR)
- Let Out the Beast (Remix) (KR)
- Run (Remix) (KR)

VCR #4

- Call Me Baby (KR)
- Dubstep Intro (KR)
- 으르렁 (Growl) (CH)

Ment

- Love Me Right (KR)

VCR #5 (Promise)

- Sing For You (KR)

Ending Ment

- Unfair (KR)
- 너의 세상으로 (Into Your World) (KR)
Kuala Lumpur, Malaysia

Opening VCR (The Exo'luxion)

- 중독 (Overdose) (KR)
- History (KR/CH)
- El Dorado (KR)

Ment

- 나비소녀 (Don't Go) (KR)
- Playboy (KR)
- 인어의 눈물 (Baby, Don't Cry) (KR)
- My Answer (KR)

VCR #2 (My Turn to Cry)

- The Star (KR)
- Exodus (KR)
- Hurt (KR)

VCR #3 (Coffee Shop)

- 피터팬 (Peter Pan) (KR)
- XOXO (KR)
- Lucky (CH)
- 3.6.5 (KR)

Ment

- Christmas Day (KR)
- 첫 눈 (First Snow) (KR)
- 12월의 기적 (Miracles in December) (CH)

Ment

- Full Moon (KR)
- Machine (KR)
- Drop That (KR)
- Let Out the Beast (KR)
- Run (KR)

VCR #4

- Call Me Baby (KR)
- Dubstep Intro (KR)
- 으르렁 (Growl) (Extended Version) (CH)

Ment

- Love Me Right (KR)

VCR #5 (Promise)

- Sing For You (KR)

Ending Ment

- Unfair (KR)
Seoul, South Korea (Encore Show)

Opening VCR (The Exo'luxion)

- 중독 (Overdose) (KR)
- History (KR/CH)
- El Dorado (KR)

Ment

- 나비소녀 (Don't Go) (KR)
- Playboy (KR)
- 인어의 눈물 (Baby, Don't Cry) (KR)
- My Answer (KR)

VCR #2 (My Turn to Cry)

- The Star (KR)
- Exodus (KR)
- Hurt (KR)

VCR #3 (Coffee Shop)

- 피터팬 (Peter Pan) (KR)
- XOXO (KR)
- Lucky (KR)
- 3.6.5 (KR)

Ment

- Christmas Day (KR)
- 첫 눈 (First Snow) (KR)
- 12월의 기적 (Miracles in December) (KR)

Ment

- Full Moon (Extended Version) (KR)
- Machine (KR)
- Drop That (Extended Version) (KR)
- Let Out the Beast (Extended Version) (KR)
- Run (Extended Version) (KR)

VCR #4

- Call Me Baby (KR)
- 으르렁 (Growl) (Extended Version) (KR)

Ment

- Love Me Right (KR)

VCR #5 (Tour Highlights)

- Girlfriend (KR)
- Unfair (KR)

Ending Ment

- Sing For You (KR)
- Promise Encore (Day 3)
Japan

Opening VCR (The Exo'luxion)

- 중독 (Overdose) (Remix) (KR)
- History (Remix) (KR)
- El Dorado (KR)

Ment

- 나비소녀 (Don't Go) (KR)
- Playboy (KR)
- 인어의 눈물 (Baby, Don't Cry) (KR)
- My Answer (KR)

VCR #2 (My Turn to Cry)

- The Star (KR)
- Exodus (KR)
- Hurt (KR)

VCR #3

- 피터팬 (Peter Pan) (KR)
- XOXO (KR)
- Lucky (KR)
- 3.6.5 (KR)

Ment

- Christmas Day (KR)
- 첫 눈 (First Snow) (KR)
- 12월의 기적 (Miracles in December) (KR)

Ment

- Full Moon (KR)
- Machine (Remix) (KR)
- Drop That (JP)
- Let Out the Beast (Remix) (KR)
- Run (Remix) (KR)
- Call Me Baby (KR)
- Love Me Right (JP)
- 으르렁 (Growl) (Stage Version) (KR)

Encore VCR

- 약속 (EXO, 2014) (KR)

Ment

- 너의 세상으로 (Into Your World) (KR)
Taipei, Taiwan

Opening VCR (The Exo'luxion)

- 중독 (Overdose) (Remix) (KR)
- History (Remix) (KR/CH)
- El Dorado (KR)

Ment

- 나비소녀 (Don't Go) (KR)
- Playboy (KR)
- 인어의 눈물 (Baby, Don't Cry) (KR)
- My Answer (CH)

VCR #2 (My Turn to Cry)

- The Star (KR)
- Exodus (KR)
- Love Me Right (KR)

VCR #3

- 피터팬 (Peter Pan) (KR)
- XOXO (KR)
- Lucky (KR)
- 3.6.5 (KR/CH)

Ment

- Christmas Day (KR)
- 첫 눈 (First Snow) (KR)
- 12월의 기적 (Miracles in December) (CH)

Ment

- Full Moon (KR)
- Machine (Remix) (KR)
- Drop That (KR)
- Let Out the Beast (Remix) (KR)
- Run (Remix) (KR)
- Call Me Baby (CH)
- 늑대와 미녀 (Wolf) (Stage Version) (KR)
- 으르렁 (Growl) (Stage Version) (CH)

Ment

- MAMA (KR/CH)

Encore VCR

- 약속 (EXO, 2014) (CH)

Ment

- 너의 세상으로 (Into Your World) (KR)
Hong Kong

Opening VCR (The Exo'luxion)

- 중독 (Overdose) (Remix) (KR)
- History (Remix) (KR/CH)
- El Dorado (KR)

Ment

- 나비소녀 (Don't Go) (KR)
- Playboy (KR)
- 인어의 눈물 (Baby, Don't Cry) (KR)
- My Answer (CH)

VCR #2 (My Turn to Cry)

- The Star (KR)
- Exodus (KR)
- Hurt (KR)

VCR #3

- 피터팬 (Peter Pan) (KR)
- XOXO (KR)
- Lucky (KR)
- 3.6.5 (KR/CH)

Ment

- Christmas Day (KR)
- 첫 눈 (First Snow) (KR)
- 12월의 기적 (Miracles in December) (CH)

Ment

- Full Moon (KR)
- Machine (Remix) (KR)
- Drop That (KR)
- Let Out the Beast (Remix) (KR)
- Run (Remix) (KR)
- Call Me Baby (CH)
- Love Me Right (CH)
- 으르렁 (Growl) (Stage Version) (CH)

Ment

- MAMA (KR/CH)

Encore VCR

- 약속 (EXO, 2014) (KR)

Ment

- 너의 세상으로 (Into Your World) (CH)

== Tour dates ==
Date	City	Country	Venue	Attendance
March 7, 2015	Seoul	South Korea	Olympic Gymnastics Arena	70,000
March 8, 2015	Seoul	South Korea	Olympic Gymnastics Arena	70,000
March 13, 2015	Seoul	South Korea	Olympic Gymnastics Arena	70,000
March 14, 2015	Seoul	South Korea	Olympic Gymnastics Arena	70,000
March 15, 2015	Seoul	South Korea	Olympic Gymnastics Arena	70,000
May 30, 2015	Shanghai	China	Mercedes-Benz Arena	20,000
May 31, 2015	Shanghai	China	Mercedes-Benz Arena	20,000
June 12, 2015	Taipei	Taiwan	Taipei Arena	20,000
June 13, 2015	Taipei	Taiwan	Taipei Arena	20,000
June 20, 2015	Bangkok	Thailand	Impact Arena	22,000
June 21, 2015	Bangkok	Thailand	Impact Arena	22,000
July 18, 2015	Beijing	China	MasterCard Center	—
July 19, 2015	Beijing	China	MasterCard Center	—
August 1, 2015	Chengdu	China	Chengdu Sports Centre Stadium	—
August 16, 2015	Hong Kong	China	AsiaWorld–Arena	20,000
August 17, 2015	Hong Kong	China	AsiaWorld–Arena	20,000
August 22, 2015	Xi'an	China	Shaanxi Province Stadium	—
September 12, 2015	Chongqing	China	Chongqing Olympic Sports Center	—
October 17, 2015	Guangzhou	China	Guangzhou Sports Arena	10,000
October 31, 2015	Fukuoka	Japan	Marine Messe Fukuoka	300,000
November 1, 2015	Fukuoka	Japan	Marine Messe Fukuoka	300,000
November 6, 2015	Tokyo	Japan	Tokyo Dome	300,000
November 7, 2015	Tokyo	Japan	Tokyo Dome	300,000
November 8, 2015	Tokyo	Japan	Tokyo Dome	300,000
November 13, 2015	Osaka	Japan	Osaka Dome	300,000
November 14, 2015	Osaka	Japan	Osaka Dome	300,000
November 15, 2015	Osaka	Japan	Osaka Dome	300,000
November 21, 2015	Macau	China	Cotai Arena	—
December 12, 2015	Nanjing	China	Nanjing Olympic Sports Center	10,000
January 9, 2016	Singapore		Singapore Indoor Stadium	12,000
January 10, 2016	Singapore		Singapore Indoor Stadium	12,000
January 23, 2016	Pasay	Philippines	SM Mall of Asia Arena	—
January 24, 2016	Pasay	Philippines	SM Mall of Asia Arena	—
February 10, 2016	Grand Prairie	United States	Verizon Theatre	—
February 12, 2016	Vancouver	Canada	Thunderbird Arena	—
February 14, 2016	Los Angeles	United States	Los Angeles Memorial Sports Arena	12,000
February 19, 2016	Rosemont	United States	Rosemont Theatre	—
February 21, 2016	Newark	United States	Prudential Center	9,919
February 27, 2016	Jakarta	Indonesia	Indonesia Convention Exhibition	—
March 5, 2016	Dalian	China	Dalian Sports Centre Stadium	—
March 12, 2016	Kuala Lumpur	Malaysia	Stadium Merdeka	15,000
March 18, 2016	Seoul	South Korea	Olympic Gymnastics Arena	45,000
March 19, 2016	Seoul	South Korea	Olympic Gymnastics Arena	45,000
March 20, 2016	Seoul	South Korea	Olympic Gymnastics Arena	45,000
Total				700,000

== Box office score data ==
Venue	City	Tickets sold / available	Gross revenue
Prudential Center	Newark, New Jersey	9,919 / 9,919 (100%)	US$1,418,705
