= Unfair =

Unfair may refer to:

- The negative form of the adjective fair; unfairness or injustice
- Unfair: The Movie
- "Unfair" (song) by Exo
- "Unfair", a song by Stray Kids from their mixtape Hop
- "Unfair", a song by 6lack from his album East Atlanta Love Letter
