= Exo's Showtime =

2013–2014 South Korean TV series

- Official poster
- Genre: Reality
- Created by: MBC Plus Media
- Developed by: MBC Plus.
- Presented by: MBC Every 1
- Starring: Exo
- Country of origin: South Korea
- Original language: Korean
- No. of episodes: 12

Production
- Production location: South Korea
- Camera setup: Multi-camera
- Running time: approx. 50 minutes
- Production company: S.M. C&C

Original release
- Release: November 28, 2013 – February 13, 2014

Exo's Showtime is a South Korean documentary starring the boy group Exo. It is the first season of the South Korean reality show series, Showtime.

== Background ==
Exo's Showtime is a reality TV show that allows the fans to see behind-the-scenes of Exo's daily lives and how they act offstage.

== Episodes ==
Ep.	Summary	Note	Broadcast Date
1	An introduction to their new show and each of the members; discussion of looks, personalities, etc. Also seen doing various activities such as a chicken eating contest and the making of their new slogan.	First episode	28 November 2013
2	Kris, Tao, Baekhyun, Chanyeol and Sehun go out window shopping and try different kinds of Korean traditional foods. Xiumin, Lay, Chen and Luhan go out biking and are seen eating street foods. While D.O. goes out by himself to watch a movie. Kai and Suho go out for a walk with Kai's dogs.	Break	5 December 2013
3	The group plans a surprise party for Chanyeol's birthday, tricking him into coming with them to shop with the alibi of "buying year-end presents" for each other. In the end, Chanyeol buys a "year-end present" for Kai, whom he idolizes sincerely. After all the presents are opened, the band celebrates the surprise party at their own boutique, "BWCW" or "Boy Who Cried Wolf".	Chanyeol's birthday	12 December 2013
4	The members exchange gifts with one another to celebrate Christmas and participate in an arm wrestling match. The band also watches "Miracle in Cell no. 7" to determine who cries the most.	Exo's Christmas celebration	19 December 2013
5	The group heads to the beach and play some games to determine who will go into the water.	Exo spends a day at the beach	26 December 2013
6	Part two of their beach vacation. Luhan, Chanyeol and Suho go out to shop for food, while some of the other members cook food. Baekhyun and D.O. decided to host a show, interviewing some of the members.	Vacation	2 January 2014
7	Baekhyun and D.O. act as tour guides and take the four Chinese members for a tour of Seoul.	Exploring Seoul	9 January 2014
8	Over dinner, the members discuss goals they have for the new year of 2014. Afterwards, some split off into groups to engage in activities related to their goals. Xiumin and Chen take a coffee making lesson; Kai and Sehun learn how to perform a tea ceremony; Chanyeol, Suho, Kris, and Tao exercise and replicate moves with a martial arts instructor.	New years celebration	16 January 2014
9	Kai and Sehun practice some dance moves; Chanyeol and Lay make the Showtime song; Suho, Chen, Baekhyun, Luhan and D.O determine who's the best in high and low notes, while also taking part in a rap battle against one another with Tao, Kris and Xiumin judging. They also practiced Wolf and Growl dance for their upcoming performance in Taiwan. They are also challenged to maintain silence and play 007 Bang while waiting for the food.	Exo at the practice room	23 January 2014
10	The members go bowling and then explore a haunted house.	—N/a	30 January 2014
11	The group is separated and each member is confined to their own karaoke room. Via text messages sent to their cell phones, they're given challenges they all must answer on their own, such as answering what's Exo's representative song or guessing what D.O. wants for his birthday. The purpose is to test Exo's "telepathy skills," thus the goal is for all members to give the same answer. Once all answer the same way, the game is won and they can be released from their rooms.	D.O.'s birthday	6 February 2014
12	Flashbacks of the previous episodes and a thigh wrestling match. The group also states their regrets and accomplishments throughout the series.	Last episode	13 February 2014
