= Exo from Exoplanet 1 – The Lost Planet =

2014 concert tour by Exo

Exo Exoplanet #1 – The Lost Planet
- Asia tour by EXO
- Associated album: Mama; XOXO; Overdose
- Start date: May 23, 2014
- End date: December 24, 2014
- No. of shows: 30
- Website: exo.smtown.com

EXO concert chronology
- Exo from Exoplanet #1 – The Lost Planet (2014); Exo Planet #2 – The EXO'luXion (2015–16)

Exo from Exoplanet #1 – The Lost Planet was the first solo concert tour of Chinese-South Korean boy band Exo. The tour was officially announced on April 7, 2014, with tickets going on sale on April 16, 2014. The Lost Planet tour began in Seoul's Olympic Gymnastics Arena on May 23, 2014.

On May 21, 2014, SM Entertainment released an official statement stating that member Kris would not be joining EXO on their first solo concert tour after Kris filed a lawsuit against SM Entertainment a week prior. SM Entertainment also released a statement stating that Kris' merchandise for the concert would be cancelled and all of the posters at the concert venue were changed to only showcase the 11 remaining members.

On October 10, 2014, member Luhan filed a lawsuit against SM Entertainment, similar to former member Kris. He discontinued his participation in the Exo from Exoplanet #1 – The Lost Planet tour as the remaining 10 members continued the tour promotion without him.

== Concerts ==
=== Seoul ===
- The Lost Planet tour was originally announced to have two concerts in Seoul with tickets for the two concerts selling out in 1.47 seconds. Due to the explosive response from fans, a third concert date was added for Seoul.

=== Hong Kong ===
- One June 4, 2014, during the second concert of Exo from Exoplanet #1 – The Lost Planet, there was a stage incident during the song 'Angel' involving member D.O. A system malfunction occurred with the wiring that was responsible for lifting D.O.'s flying stage, sending two fans to the hospital. Exo released apologies and concern for the two fans immediately following the concert. D.O. and Suho also went to the hospital to visit the fans. SM Entertainment also released an official explanation and apology for the incident and confirmed that they would pay for the medical expenses for the two injured fans.

=== Bangkok ===
- On September 12, 2014, member Luhan issued an apology via his official Weibo page, stating that he would be unable to attend the two shows in Bangkok, Thailand due to illness. Luhan reasoned long-term exhaustion, headaches, and insomnia for his absence during the two shows.

== Setlist ==
Seoul, South Korea

VCR (Intro)

- MAMA (remix) (KR-CH)
- Let Out the Beast (CH-KR)
- I'm Lay (Lay solo) (EN)
- 월광 (Moonlight) (EXO-K)

Ment

- Delight (Chanyeol solo) (KR)
- 너의 세상으로 (Into Your World) (EXO-M)
- Black Pearl (CH)
- Uprising (Chen solo) (KR)
- SM Medley: 쏘리 쏘리 (Sorry, Sorry) (KR) - Super Junior, Dream Girl (KR) & 링딩동 (Ring Ding Dong) - Shinee, Genie (KR) & Gee (CH) - Girls' Generation
- XOXO (KR)
- Beat Maker (Sehun solo dance)
- Love, Love, Love (KR)
- Thunder (EXO-K)
- Tell Me What Is Love (D.O. solo) (KR)
- My Lady (EXO-M)
- My Turn to Cry (Baekhyun solo) (KR)
- 인어의 눈물 (Baby Don't Cry) (EXO-K)

Ment

- Machine (EXO-K)
- Breakin' Machine (Xiumin solo dance)
- 3.6.5 (CH-KR-CH)
- History (KR-CH)
- The Star (Luhan solo) (CH)
- Beautiful (Suho solo) (KR)
- 피터팬 (Peter Pan) (KR)
- Metal (Tao solo dance)

VCR (Heart Attack)

- Deep Breath (Kai solo) (KR)
- Overdose (KR)

(Encore)

- 늑대와 미녀 (Wolf) (KR)
- 으르렁 (Growl) (KR)

Ment

- Lucky (KR)
- VCR and Ending Ment
Japan

Opening (The Lost Planet)

- Haka (KR)
- MAMA (KR-CH-KR)
- Let Out The Beast (CH-KR-CH)
- I'm Lay (Lay solo) (EN)
- 월광 (Moonlight) (EXO-K)
- Rocket Dive (Chanyeol solo) (KR)
- 너의 세상으로 (Into Your World) (EXO-K)
- Black Pearl (CH)
- Uprising (Chen solo) (KR)
- XOXO (KR)
- Exorient (Sehun solo dance)
- Love, Love, Love (KR)
- Thunder (EXO-K)
- Tell Me What IS Love (D.O. solo) (KR)
- My Lady (EXO-M)
- My Turn to Cry (Baekhyun solo) (KR)
- 인어의 눈물 (Baby Don't Cry) (EXO-K)
- Machine (EXO-K)
- Breakin' Machine (Xiumin solo dance)
- 3.6.5. (CH-KR-CH)
- History (KR-CH-KR)
- 피터팬 (Peter Pan) (KR)
- Beautiful (Suho solo) (KR)
- Metal (Tao solo dance)
- Heart Attack (KR)
- Deep Breath (Kai solo) (KR)
- Overdose (KR)

Encore

- 늑대와 미녀 (Wolf) (KR)
- 으르렁 (Growl) (KR)
- The First Snow (KR)
- Lucky (KR)
- (ending)
Singapore

VCR (Intro)

- MAMA (remix) (KR-CH-KR)
- Let Out the Beast (CH-KR-CH)
- I'm Lay (Lay solo) (EN)
- 월광 (Moonlight) (KR)

Ment

- Delight (Chanyeol solo) (KR)
- 너의 세상으로 (Into Your World) (EXO-M)
- Black Pearl (CH)
- Uprising (Chen solo) (KR)
- SM Medley: 쏘리 쏘리 (Sorry Sorry) (KR) - Super Junior, Dream Girl (KR) & 링딩동 (Ring Ding Dong) - Shinee, Genie (KR) & Gee (CH) - Girls' Generation
- XOXO (KR)
- Exorient (Sehun solo dance)
- Love, Love, Love (KR)
- Thunder (EXO-K)
- Tell Me What Is Love (D.O. solo) (KR)
- My Lady (EXO-M)
- My Turn to Cry (Baekhyun solo) (KR)
- 인어의 눈물 (Baby Don't Cry) (EXO-K)

Ment

- Machine (EXO-K)
- Breakin' Machine (Xiumin solo dance)
- 3.6.5 (CH-KR-CH)
- History (KR-CH-KR)
- The Star (Luhan solo) (CH)
- Beautiful (Suho solo) (KR)
- 피터팬 (Peter Pan) (KR)
- Metal (Tao solo dance)

VCR (Heart Attack)

- Deep Breath (Kai solo) (KR)
- Overdose (KR)

(Encore)

- 늑대와 미녀 (Wolf) (KR)
- 으르렁 (Growl) (KR)

Ment

- Lucky (KR)
- VCR and Ending Ment
Jakarta, Indonesia

VCR (Intro)

- MAMA (remix) (KR-CH-KR)
- Let Out the Beast (CH-KR-CH)
- I'm Lay (Lay solo) (EN)
- 월광 (Moonlight) (EXO-K)

Ment

- Delight (Chanyeol solo) (KR)
- 너의 세상으로 (Into Your World) (EXO-M)
- Black Pearl (CH)
- Uprising (Chen solo) (KR)
- SM Medley: 쏘리 쏘리 (Sorry Sorry) (KR) - Super Junior, Dream Girl (KR) & 링딩동 (Ring Ding Dong) - Shinee, Genie (KR) & Gee (CH) - Girls' Generation
- XOXO (KR)
- Love, Love, Love (KR)
- Thunder (EXO-K)
- Tell Me What Is Love (D.O. solo) (KR)
- My Lady (EXO-M)
- My Turn to Cry (Baekhyun solo) (KR)
- 인어의 눈물 (Baby Don't Cry) (EXO-K)

Ment

- Machine (EXO-K)
- Breakin' Machine (Xiumin solo dance)
- 3.6.5 (CH-KR-CH)
- History (KR-CH-KR)
- The Star (Luhan solo) (CH)
- Beautiful (Suho solo) (KR)
- 피터팬 (Peter Pan) (KR)
- Metal (Tao solo dance)

VCR (Heart Attack)

- Deep Breath (Kai solo) (KR)
- Overdose (KR)

(Encore)

- 늑대와 미녀 (Wolf) (KR)
- 으르렁 (Growl) (KR)

Ment

- Lucky (KR)
- VCR and Ending Ment
Bangkok, Thailand

VCR (Intro)

- MAMA (remix) (KR-CH-KR)
- Let Out the Beast (CH-KR-CH)
- I'm Lay (Lay solo) (EN)
- 월광 (Moonlight) (EXO-K)

Ment

- Delight (Chanyeol solo) (KR)
- 너의 세상으로 (Into Your World) (EXO-M)
- Black Pearl (CH)
- Uprising (Chen solo) (KR)
- SM Medley: 쏘리 쏘리 (Sorry Sorry) (KR) - Super Junior, Dream Girl (KR) & 링딩동 (Ring Ding Dong) - Shinee, Genie (KR) & Gee (CH) - Girls' Generation
- XOXO (KR)
- Exorient (Sehun solo dance)
- Love, Love, Love (KR)
- Thunder (EXO-K)
- Tell Me What Is Love (D.O. solo) (KR)
- My Lady (EXO-M)
- My Turn to Cry (Baekhyun solo) (KR)
- 인어의 눈물 (Baby Don't Cry) (EXO-K)

Ment

- Machine (EXO-K)
- Breakin' Machine (Xiumin solo dance)
- 3.6.5 (CH-KR-CH)
- History (KR-CH-KR)
- Beautiful (Suho solo) (KR)
- 피터팬 (Peter Pan) (KR)
- Metal (Tao solo dance)

VCR (Heart Attack)

- Deep Breath (Kai solo) (KR)
- Overdose (KR)

(Encore)

- 늑대와 미녀 (Wolf) (KR)
- 으르렁 (Growl) (KR)

Ment

- Lucky (KR)
- VCR and Ending Ment
Hong Kong

VCR (Intro)

- MAMA (remix) (KR-CH-KR)
- Let Out the Beast (CH-KR-CH)
- I'm Lay (Lay solo) (EN)
- 월광 (Moonlight) (EXO-M)

Ment

- Delight (Chanyeol solo) (KR)
- 너의 세상으로 (Into Your World) (EXO-M)
- Black Pearl (CH)
- Uprising (Chen solo) (KR)
- SM Medley: 쏘리 쏘리 (Sorry Sorry) (KR) - Super Junior, Dream Girl (KR) & 링딩동 (Ring Ding Dong) - Shinee, Genie (KR) & Gee (CH) - Girls' Generation
- XOXO (CH)
- Exorient (Sehun solo dance)
- Love, Love, Love (KR)
- Thunder (EXO-M)
- Tell Me What Is Love (D.O. solo) (KR)
- My Lady (EXO-M)
- My Turn to Cry (Baekhyun solo) (KR)
- 인어의 눈물 (Baby Don't Cry) (EXO-M)

Ment

- Machine (EXO-K)
- Breakin' Machine (Xiumin solo dance)
- 3.6.5 (CH-KR-CH)
- History (KR-CH-KR)
- The Star (Luhan solo) (CH)
- Beautiful (Suho solo) (KR)
- 피터팬 (Peter Pan) (KR)
- Metal (Tao solo dance)

VCR (Heart Attack)

- Deep Breath (Kai solo) (KR)
- Overdose (CH)

(Encore)

- 늑대와 미녀 (Wolf) (CH)
- 으르렁 (Growl) (CH)

Ment

- Lucky (CH)
- VCR and Ending Ment
Taipei, Taiwan

VCR (Intro)

- MAMA (remix) (KR-CH-KR)
- Let Out the Beast (CH-KR-CH)
- I'm Lay (Lay solo) (EN)
- 월광 (Moonlight) (EXO-K)

Ment

- Delight (Chanyeol solo) (KR)
- 너의 세상으로 (Into Your World) (EXO-M)
- Black Pearl (CH)
- Uprising (Chen solo) (KR)
- SM Medley: 쏘리 쏘리 (Sorry Sorry) (KR) - Super Junior, Dream Girl (KR) & 링딩동 (Ring Ding Dong) - Shinee, Genie (KR) & Gee (CH) - Girls' Generation
- XOXO (CH)
- Exorient (Sehun solo dance)
- Love, Love, Love (KR)
- Thunder (EXO-M)
- Tell Me What Is Love (D.O. solo) (KR)
- My Lady (EXO-M)
- My Turn to Cry (Baekhyun solo) (KR)
- 인어의 눈물 (Baby Don't Cry) (EXO-M)

Ment

- Machine (EXO-K)
- Breakin' Machine (Xiumin solo dance)
- 3.6.5 (CH-KR-CH)
- History (KR-CH-KR)
- The Star (Luhan solo) (CH)
- Beautiful (Suho solo) (KR)
- 피터팬 (Peter Pan) (KR)
- Metal (Tao solo dance)

VCR (Heart Attack)

- Deep Breath (Kai solo) (KR)
- Overdose (KR)

(Encore)

- 늑대와 미녀 (Wolf) (KR)
- 으르렁 (Growl) (KR)

Ment

- Lucky (KR)
- VCR and Ending Ment
China

VCR (Intro)

- MAMA (remix) (KR-CH-KR)
- Let Out the Beast (CH-KR-CH)
- I'm Lay (Lay solo) (EN)
- 월광 (Moonlight) (EXO-M)

Ment

- Delight (Chanyeol solo) (KR)
- 너의 세상으로 (Into Your World) (EXO-M)
- Black Pearl (CH)
- Uprising (Chen solo) (KR)
- SM Medley: 쏘리 쏘리 (Sorry Sorry) (KR) - Super Junior, Dream Girl (KR) & 링딩동 (Ring Ding Dong) - Shinee, Genie (KR) & Gee (CH) - Girls' Generation
- XOXO (CH)
- Exorient (Sehun solo dance)
- Love, Love, Love (KR)
- Thunder (EXO-M)
- Tell Me What Is Love (D.O. solo) (KR)
- My Lady (EXO-M)
- My Turn to Cry (Baekhyun solo) (KR)
- 인어의 눈물 (Baby Don't Cry) (EXO-M)

Ment

- Machine (EXO-K)
- Breakin' Machine (Xiumin solo dance)
- 3.6.5 (CH-KR-CH)
- History (KR-CH-KR)
- The Star (Luhan solo) (CH)
- Beautiful (Suho solo) (KR)
- 피터팬 (Peter Pan) (KR)
- Metal (Tao solo dance)

VCR (Heart Attack)

- Deep Breath (Kai solo) (KR)
- Overdose (CH)

(Encore)

- 늑대와 미녀 (Wolf) (CH)
- 으르렁 (Growl) (CH)

Ment

- Lucky (CH)
- VCR and Ending Ment

== Tour dates ==
| Date | City | Country | Venue | Attendance |
|---|---|---|---|---|
| May 23, 2014 | Seoul | South Korea | Olympic Gymnastics Arena | 42,000 |
| May 24, 2014 | Seoul | South Korea | Olympic Gymnastics Arena | 42,000 |
| May 25, 2014 | Seoul | South Korea | Olympic Gymnastics Arena | 42,000 |
| June 1, 2014 | Hong Kong | China | AsiaWorld–Arena | — |
| June 2, 2014 | Hong Kong | China | AsiaWorld–Arena | — |
| June 14, 2014 | Wuhan | China | Wuhan Sports Center Stadium | 10,000 |
| June 28, 2014 | Chongqing | China | Chongqing Olympic Sports Center | 10,000 |
| July 5, 2014 | Chengdu | China | Chengdu Sports Centre | — |
| July 11, 2014 | Taipei | Taiwan | Taipei Arena | 20,000 |
| July 12, 2014 | Taipei | Taiwan | Taipei Arena | 20,000 |
| July 18, 2014 | Shanghai | China | Mercedes-Benz Arena | 20,000 |
| July 19, 2014 | Shanghai | China | Mercedes-Benz Arena | 20,000 |
| July 27, 2014 | Changsha | China | Helong Stadium | — |
| August 2, 2014 | Xi'an | China | Shaanxi Province Stadium | 10,000 |
| August 23, 2014 | Singapore | | Singapore Indoor Stadium | 8,000 |
| August 30, 2014 | Guangzhou | China | Guangzhou International Sports Arena | — |
| September 6, 2014 | Jakarta | Indonesia | Lapangan D Senayan | — |
| September 13, 2014 | Bangkok | Thailand | Impact Arena | 22,000 |
| September 14, 2014 | Bangkok | Thailand | Impact Arena | 22,000 |
| September 20, 2014 | Beijing | China | MasterCard Center | 20,000 |
| September 21, 2014 | Beijing | China | MasterCard Center | 20,000 |
| November 11, 2014 | Fukuoka | Japan | Marine Messe Fukuoka | — |
| November 12, 2014 | Fukuoka | Japan | Marine Messe Fukuoka | — |
| November 13, 2014 | Fukuoka | Japan | Marine Messe Fukuoka | — |
| November 18, 2014 | Tokyo | Japan | Yoyogi National Gymnasium | 36,000 |
| November 19, 2014 | Tokyo | Japan | Yoyogi National Gymnasium | 36,000 |
| November 20, 2014 | Tokyo | Japan | Yoyogi National Gymnasium | 36,000 |
| December 22, 2014 | Osaka | Japan | Osaka-jō Hall | 30,000 |
| December 23, 2014 | Osaka | Japan | Osaka-jō Hall | 30,000 |
| December 24, 2014 | Osaka | Japan | Osaka-jō Hall | 30,000 |
| Total | | | | 320,000 |
