= Sing for You (EP) =

- Digital cover artwork

EP by Exo
- Released: December 10, 2015
- Recorded: 2015
- Studio: Doobdoob (Seoul); InGrid (Seoul); Seoul
- Genre: Pop; R&B; hip-hop
- Length: 17:07
- Language: Korean; Mandarin; English
- Label: SM; KT Music
- Producer: Lee Soo-man

Exo chronology
Exodus (2015)	Sing for You (2015)	Ex'Act (2016)

Singles from Sing for You
- 1. "Lightsaber" Released: November, 11 2015; 2. "Sing for You" Released: December 10, 2015; 3. "Unfair" Released: December 10, 2015

Sing for You is the fourth extended play by South Korean–Chinese boy band Exo. It was released by SM Entertainment in Korean and Chinese versions on December 10, 2015. The album held the record as the fastest selling album in the history of South Korean album sales chart Hanteo, until it was overtaken by Exo's third studio album Ex'Act in June 2016. It is the first Exo record to not feature Tao, as he filed a lawsuit against SM Entertainment and left the group in August 2015.

== Background and release ==
On November 24, 2015, Exo was confirmed to be releasing their second winter special album, after Miracles in December (2013). Teaser images for the album began to be released from December 2. The album's track list, including four new songs and a bonus track "Lightsaber", previously released as a single in November, was announced on December 7. Finally, the mini-album was released digitally and physically on December 10.

== Artwork and packaging ==
Sing for You's digital album cover depicted an astronaut floating in space alone (apparently Baekhyun as depicted in the music video) and a whale. The album's physical version comes in 18 versions (nine versions for Korean and Chinese, respectively). Each album depicts each of the nine members of Exo who are all facing D.O. in the middle. The album's back cover serve as a puzzle piece when joined together forms the image depicted in the digital cover artwork.

== Promotion ==
On December 10, 2015, shortly after Sing for You was released, Exo held a showcase with an audience of 1,500 to promote the album at Lotte World in Seoul. The showcase was live streamed using the mobile application V Live and afterwards set the record as the most-watched live stream ever on the application. Exo began performing the songs "Sing for You" and "Unfair" on Korean music shows from December 12 and 18 respectively. They also added these songs to the setlist of their second solo concert tour The Exo'luxion starting from the Singapore show on January 9, 2016.

== Singles ==
On November 4, 2015, Exo was announced to be releasing "Lightsaber", a promotional song for the movie Star Wars: The Force Awakens in South Korea, as part of the collaboration project between SM Entertainment and Walt Disney. A teaser video for the song was released on November 8, followed by its music video and digital release on November 11. "Lightsaber" was later announced to be included in Sing for You as a bonus track on December 7. Exo performed the song for the first time at the 17th Mnet Asian Music Awards. The song peaked at number 9 on Gaon's digital chart.

A teaser video for the album's title song "Sing for You" was released on December 8. The song was released along with the EP as well as its music videos on 10 December. It peaked at number 3 on Gaon's digital chart and achieved "triple crown", winning first place three times on KBS's weekly music show Music Bank.

== Commercial performance ==
Both versions combined, Sing for You broke the record previously held by Exodus, Exo's second studio album, as the album with the biggest first-week sales recorded by the Korean album sales monitoring website Hanteo with over 267,900 copies. Individually, the album's Korean and Chinese versions debuted at number 1 and 2 respectively on both Gaon's weekly and monthly album charts, and later landed at number 2 and 7 respectively on its yearly album chart for 2015.

== Track listing ==
Credits adapted from Naver.

Korean version
No.	Title	Lyrics	Music	Arrangement	Length
1.	"Unfair" (Korean: 불공평해; RR: Bulgong Pyeonghae)	Deanfluenza	Deanfluenza (Joombas); Beat&Keys (Joombas)	Joombas	3:02
2.	"Sing for You"	Kenzie	Matthew Tishler; Felicia Barton; Aaron Benward	Kenzie	3:55
3.	"Girl x Friend"	JQ (Makeumine Works); Seolim (Makeumine Works); Ji Ye-won (Makeumine Works)	LDN Noise; Adrian McKinnon; Jeremy "Tay" Jasper; ShAun	LDN Noise	3:42
4.	"On the Snow" (Korean: 발자국; RR: Baljaguk; lit. Footprint)	Ryu Da-som	LDN Noise; Andrew Choi; Ylva Dimberg (The Kennel)	LDN Noise	3:23
5.	"Lightsaber" (Bonus Track)	Chanyeol; MQ (BeatBurger); Jung Joo-hee	LDN Noise; Adrian McKinnon	LDN Noise	3:05
Total length:					17:07

Chinese version
No.	Title	Lyrics	Music	Arrangement	Length
1.	"Unfair (偏心)"	Deanfluenza; DeerJenny	Deanfluenza (Joombas); Beat&Keys (Joombas)	Joombas	3:02
2.	"Sing for You (爲你而唱)"	Zhou Weijie	Matthew Tishler; Felicia Barton; Aaron Benward; Kenzie	Kenzie	3:55
3.	"Girl x Friend (女 x 友)"	JQ (Makeumine Works); Seolim (Makeumine Works); Ji Ye-won (Makeumine Works); Lin Xinye	LDN Noise; Adrian McKinnon; Jeremy "Tay" Jasper; ShAun	LDN Noise	3:42
4.	"On the Snow (脚印)"	Ryu Da-som	LDN Noise; Andrew Choi; Ylva Dimberg (The Kennel)	LDN Noise	3:23
5.	"Lightsaber (光剑)" (bonus track)	Jung Joo-hee; Wang Yajun	LDN Noise; Adrian McKinnon	LDN Noise	3:05
Total length:					17:07

== Charts ==
Korean and Chinese versions

Chart	Peak position	
Chart	Korean version	Chinese version
South Korea Weekly Albums (Gaon)	1	2
South Korea Monthly Albums (Gaon)	1	2
South Korea Yearly Albums – 2015	2	7
Japan Weekly Albums (Oricon)	6	12
Japan Monthly Albums (Oricon)	26	44

Combined version

Chart	Peak position
US World Albums (Billboard)	6

== Sales ==
Country	Sales	
Country	Korean version	Chinese version
South Korea (Gaon)	331,976	176,239
Japan (Oricon)	20,773	8,923

== Awards and nominations ==
Award	Category	Result
Gaon Chart K-Pop Awards	Artist of the Year (Album) – 4th Quarter	Won

Music program awards
Song	Program	Date
"Sing for You"	Music Bank	December 18, 2015
"Sing for You"	Music Bank	December 25, 2015
"Sing for You"	Music Bank	January 1, 2016
"Sing for You"	M Countdown	December 31, 2015

== Release history ==
Release history for Sing for You
Region	Date	Format	Label	Ref
South Korea	December 10, 2015	CD	SM; KT	–
Various	December 10, 2015	Digital download; streaming	SM	–
Taiwan	January 8, 2016	CD	Avex Taiwan	
