= Fairing =

Fairing may refer to:

== Aerodynamics and hydrodynamics ==
- Aircraft fairing, a structure in aircraft design used to reduce drag and improve appearance
- Bicycle fairing, a type of fairing coverage for bicycles
- Motorcycle fairing, a type of fairing applied to motorcycles
- Payload fairing, an aerodynamic structure that encapsulates the payload of a rocket-powered launch vehicle
- Cable fairing, a form of fairing applied to towed cables, primarily in marine environments

== Other uses ==
- Cornish fairing, a type of ginger biscuit
- China fairing, a type of porcelain figurine

== See also ==
- Fair (disambiguation)
- Feiring (disambiguation)
