= Feiring =

Feiring may refer to:

Places:

- Feiring, Norway, area in the municipality of Eidsvoll

People:

- Alice Feiring, American author and wine critic
- Bertha Feiring Tapper (1859 - 1915), Norwegian composer, pianist and teacher

== See also ==
- Fairing (disambiguation)
