= Exo =

South Korean boy band

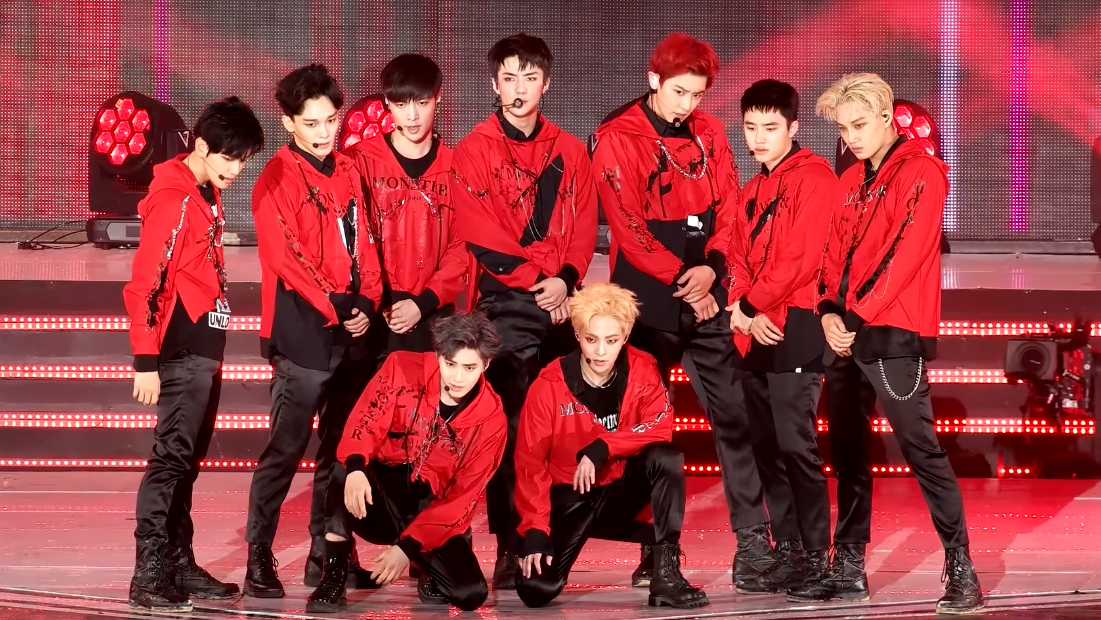
- Exo in June 2016; From left to right, standing: Baekhyun, Chen, Lay, Sehun, Chanyeol, D.O., Kai; From left to right, kneeling: Suho, Xiumin

Background information
- Origin: Seoul, South Korea
- Genres: K-pop; R&B; hip-hop; EDM; electropop; dance-pop
- Years active: 2012–present
- Labels: SM; Avex
- Spinoffs: Exo-CBX; Exo-SC; Exo-KaSe; SuperM
- Spinoff of: Exo-K; Exo-M
- Members: Xiumin; Suho; Lay; Baekhyun; Chen; Chanyeol; D.O.; Kai; Sehun
- Past members: Luhan; Kris; Tao
- Website: www.smentertainment.com/artist/

Korean name
- Hangul: 엑소
Transcriptions
- Revised Romanization: Ekso
- McCune–Reischauer: Ekso

Japanese name
- Katakana: エクソ
Transcriptions
- Revised Hepburn: Ekuso

Exo (Korean: 엑소; RR: Ekso; stylized in all caps) is a South Korean-Chinese boy band based in Seoul formed by SM Entertainment in 2011 and debuted in 2012. The group consists of nine members: Xiumin, Suho, Lay, Baekhyun, Chen, Chanyeol, D.O., Kai and Sehun. They are noted for releasing music and performing extensively in Korean, Mandarin and Japanese.

The group debuted with twelve members separated into Exo-K (Suho, Baekhyun, Chanyeol, D.O., Kai and Sehun) and Exo-M (Xiumin, Lay, Chen, Luhan, Kris and Tao). Members Kris, Luhan, and Tao departed the group individually amid legal battles with SM Entertainment in 2014 and 2015. Exo-K and Exo-M performed music in Korean and Mandarin, respectively, until the release of their third EP Overdose in 2014. Since then, Exo have exclusively performed as one group, although their music continues to feature multiple languages. Members Chen, Baekhyun, and Xiumin debuted in the sub-unit Exo-CBX in 2016. Members Sehun and Chanyeol began promoting as the sub-unit Exo-SC in 2019. All members also maintain individual careers in music, film and television.

Exo's first studio album XOXO (2013), released alongside breakthrough single "Growl", was received positively by critics and sold over one million copies with its repackage, making Exo the first Korean act to do so in twelve years. The group's later works expanded on their early commercial success, with their subsequent Korean studio albums combined with their repackages each selling over one million copies. Exo's sixth studio album, Don't Mess Up My Tempo (2018), became their highest-charting album on the US Billboard 200, debuting at number 23. Their eighth studio album, Exist (2023), is their best selling album in South Korea, where it sold over 2 million copies.

Exo have won numerous awards, including five consecutive Album of the Year awards at the MAMA Awards and two consecutive Artist of the Year awards at the Melon Music Awards, and have performed over 100 concerts across four headlining tours and multiple joint tours. The group ranked as one of the top five most influential celebrities on the Forbes Korea Power Celebrity 40 list from 2014 to 2018. They have been labelled "Nation's Pick" by the Korea Tourism Organization and by some as the "Kings of K-pop". Outside of music, the group members have endorsed brands such as Nature Republic and Samsung and participate in philanthropic efforts such as Smile For U, an ongoing project by SM Entertainment and UNICEF that began in 2015.

== Background ==
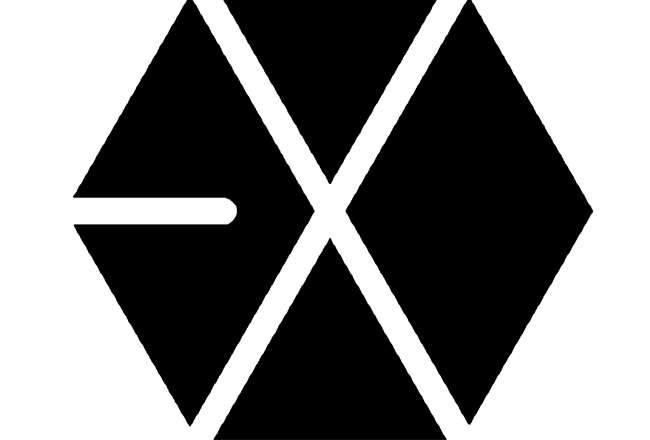
Logo of Exo

In 2011, SM Entertainment founder Lee Soo-man revealed plans to debut a new boy band that would be divided into two sub-groups, promoting the same music simultaneously in South Korea and China by performing songs in both Korean and Mandarin. After several lineup changes in December 2011, the group finalized its name as Exo, taken from the word "exoplanet". The news of an upcoming debut from SM Entertainment attracted substantial media attention from within South Korea and internationally, with many comparing Exo to fellow SM boy band TVXQ. It was also reported that Exo would compete with a new girl group from rival YG Entertainment.

== History ==
=== 2006–2012: Formation and early years ===
Exo-K's eventual leader, Suho, was the first member to join SM Entertainment in 2006. The following year, Kai, with encouragement from his father, auditioned at the SM Youth Best Contest; he won and received a contract. In 2008, Chanyeol, who had been studying at an acting academy, and Sehun, who was first scouted by SM Entertainment at the age of thirteen and then went through four auditions in two years, were the next members to become trainees. In 2010, D.O. sang for his audition and was offered a contract. The last member of Exo-K to become a trainee was Baekhyun, who joined in 2011 through SM Entertainment's casting system and trained for approximately one year before debut. Exo-M leader Kris auditioned in 2008 at a global SM Entertainment audition in Canada, later moving to South Korea for training. That same year, Lay was discovered through a global audition and subsequently moved to South Korea, while Xiumin attended an audition with his friend and placed second. In 2010, Luhan was scouted by an SM Entertainment representative in Seoul and passed his audition, while Tao was cast through the SM auditions in China at Qingdao. The last member to join Exo-M was Chen in 2011. The band's first televised performance was at the annual SBS Gayo Daejeon event on December 29, 2011.

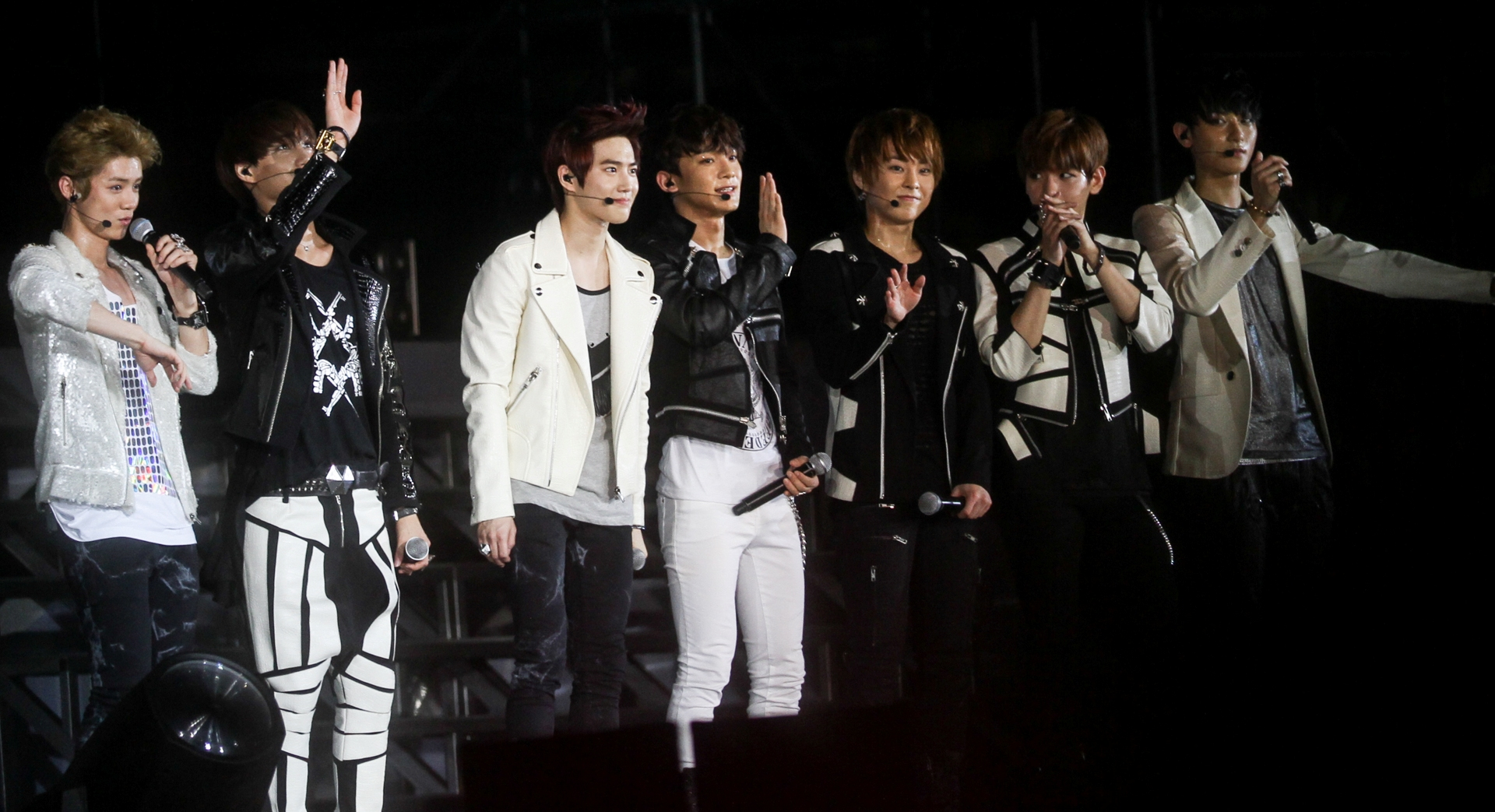
Exo at SM Town Live World Tour III in Singapore in November 2012

Exo-K and Exo-M debuted with the single "Mama" on April 8, 2012, followed by the EP Mama on April 9. The two sub-groups promoted the album separately; Exo-K performed on South Korean music program Inkigayo, while Exo-M performed on the Top Chinese Music Awards in Shenzhen on the same day. The Korean version of the EP peaked at number one on South Korea's Gaon Album Chart and at number eight on the Billboard World Albums Chart, while the Mandarin version reached number two on China's Sina Album Chart and number one on various Chinese streaming platforms. Prior their debut, Exo released two singles, "What Is Love" and "History", which peaked at numbers 88 and 68, respectively, on the Gaon Digital Chart and at number six on the Sina Music Chart. Exo was awarded Best New Asian Group at the 2012 Mnet Asian Music Awards and the Newcomer Award at the Golden Disc Awards.

=== 2013–2014: Domestic breakthrough ===
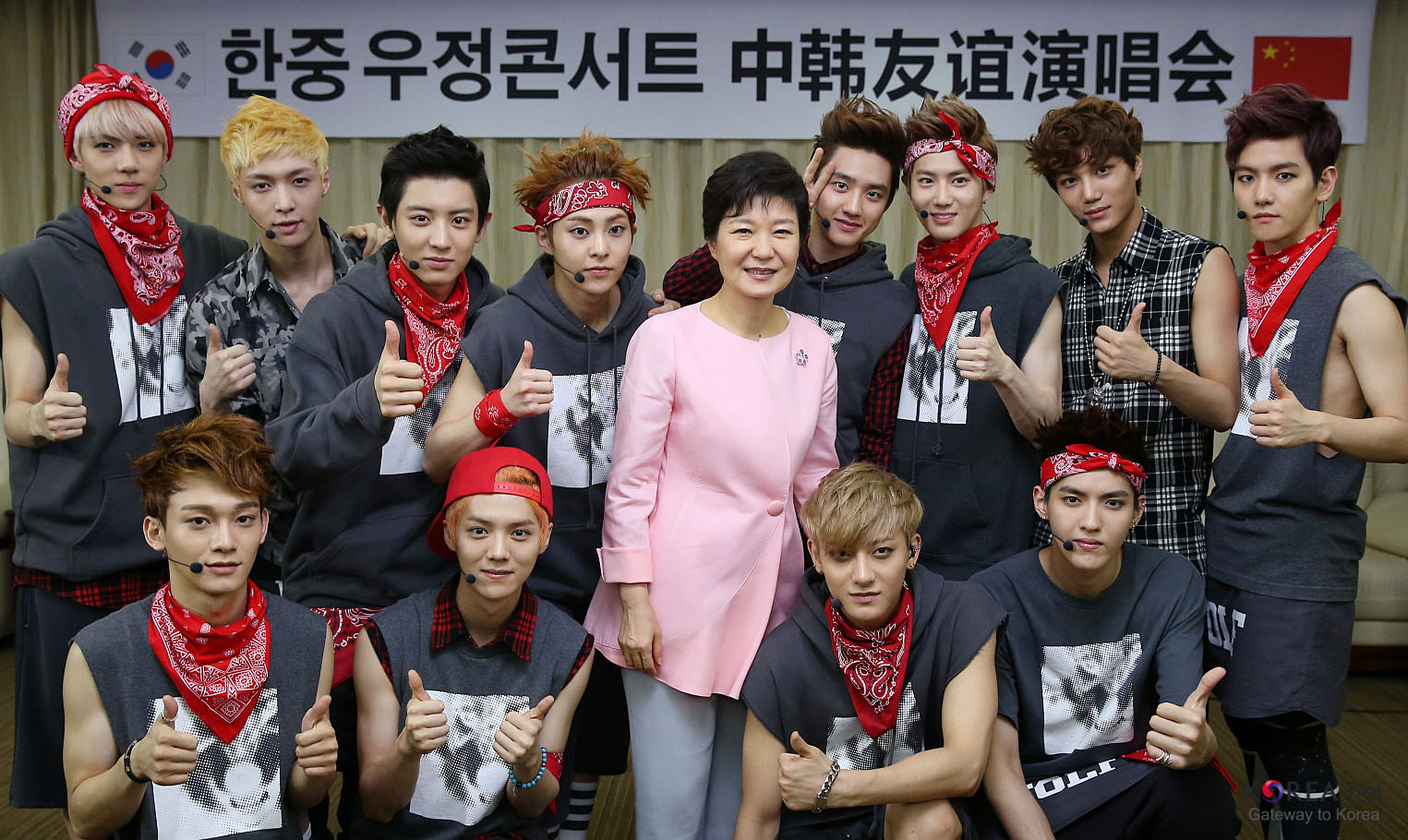
Exo with South Korean President Park Geun-hye in China on June 28, 2013

The group's first studio album, XOXO, was released on June 3, 2013, in two versions: one in Korean and one in Mandarin. XOXO was jointly promoted by both sub-units. Exo recorded the album's lead single "Wolf" together, although the rest of the album tracks were recorded separately. A repackaged version of the album, Growl, was released on August 5, 2013, with three additional tracks. All versions of XOXO collectively sold over one million copies, making Exo the first South Korean artists to reach that milestone in 12 years. That December, Exo released a second EP, Miracles in December, as a special winter album containing the single of the same name. Prior to the release, the group promoted the album through their first reality show, Exo's Showtime, which premiered on November 28, 2013. Following their 2013 releases, Exo won several awards, including Song of the Year at the Melon Music Awards for "Growl" and Album of the Year at the Mnet Asian Music Awards for XOXO.

Exo's third EP, Overdose, was released on May 7, 2014. Originally scheduled to be released on April 21, the album was delayed due to the Sewol Ferry accident on April 16. The Korean edition peaked at number 129 on the Billboard 200, making Exo the highest-ever charting male Korean group at the time. Overdose became the best selling release of 2014 in South Korea and was the first EP to top the yearly charts. On December 22, Exo released their first live album, Exology Chapter 1: The Lost Planet. The album's single, "December, 2014 (The Winter's Tale)", peaked at number one on the Gaon Digital Chart, making it Exo's first number one. By the end of 2014, Exo was Japan's best-selling K-pop artist of the year. On May 15, 2014, Kris filed a lawsuit against SM Entertainment to terminate his contract. He alleged that the company disregarded his health and maintained unfair profit distributions. On May 24, the group embarked on their first headlining tour, Exo from Exoplanet 1 – The Lost Planet, at the Olympic Gymnastics Arena. Tickets for the concert sold out in 1.47 seconds, breaking the record for the quickest concert sell-out by a Korean artist. On October 10, Luhan also filed a lawsuit against SM Entertainment to terminate his contract, citing health problems and different treatment than the group's Korean members.

=== 2015: Continued popularity and Japanese debut ===
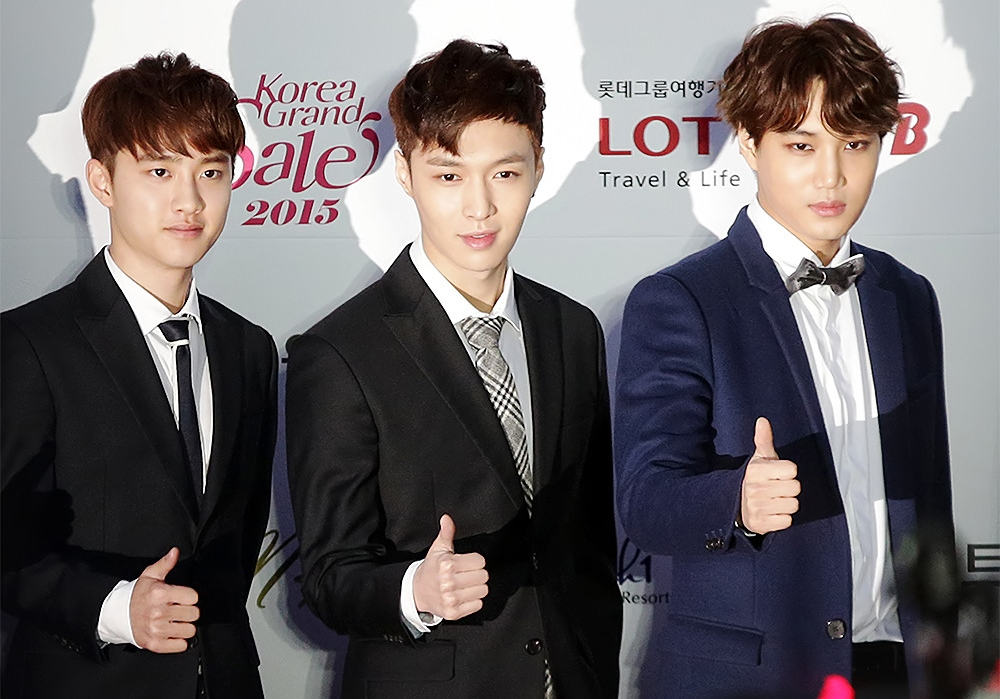
From left to right: D.O, Lay, and Kai at the 24th Seoul Music Awards in January 2015

On March 7, 2015, Exo began their second headlining world tour, Exoplanet 2 – The Exo'luxion, at the Olympic Gymnastics Arena in Seoul. The group released their second studio album Exodus on March 30, 2015, with both Korean and Mandarin versions. Lead single "Call Me Baby" was released ahead of schedule, on March 27, after versions of the song leaked online, while the music videos were released four days later. Exo entered Billboard's Canadian Hot 100 chart at number 98, making them the first K-pop group and second Korean artist to chart there. Tao was absent during promotions for Exodus due to injuries and, on August 24, became the third member to file a lawsuit against SM Entertainment to terminate his contract. Exo released a repackaged version of Exodus, titled Love Me Right, on June 3, 2015. The album with its repackage sold over one million copies, making it Exo's second album to do so after XOXO. The re-issue added four new songs, including the single "Love Me Right". Due to Tao's absence, the group promoted the song as nine members. That October, Exo became the first artist to hold a dome concert in South Korea, called Exo – Love Concert in Dome, at the Gocheok Sky Dome in Seoul.

On November 4, 2015, Exo released their Japanese debut single album Love Me Right ~romantic universe~, which contained the Japanese version of "Love Me Right" and an original Japanese song titled "Drop That". On the day of release, the album sold 147,000 copies and reached the top of the Oricon chart, becoming the all-time best-selling debut single in Japan by a Korean artist. Five days later, Exo released a special single titled "Lightsaber" to promote the movie Star Wars: The Force Awakens ahead of its release in South Korea as part of a collaboration between SM Entertainment and Walt Disney. On December 10, Exo released their second winter special release and fourth EP, Sing for You, containing the singles "Sing for You" and "Unfair". Part of the profits from the album were donated to UNICEF's Smile For U campaign, to support the music education for children in Asia.

In December 2015, South Korean entertainment industry leaders ranked Exo at number seven in the top ten pop culture leaders of 2015, the highest rank held by a K-pop artist.

=== 2016–2017: Further success and initial solo activities ===
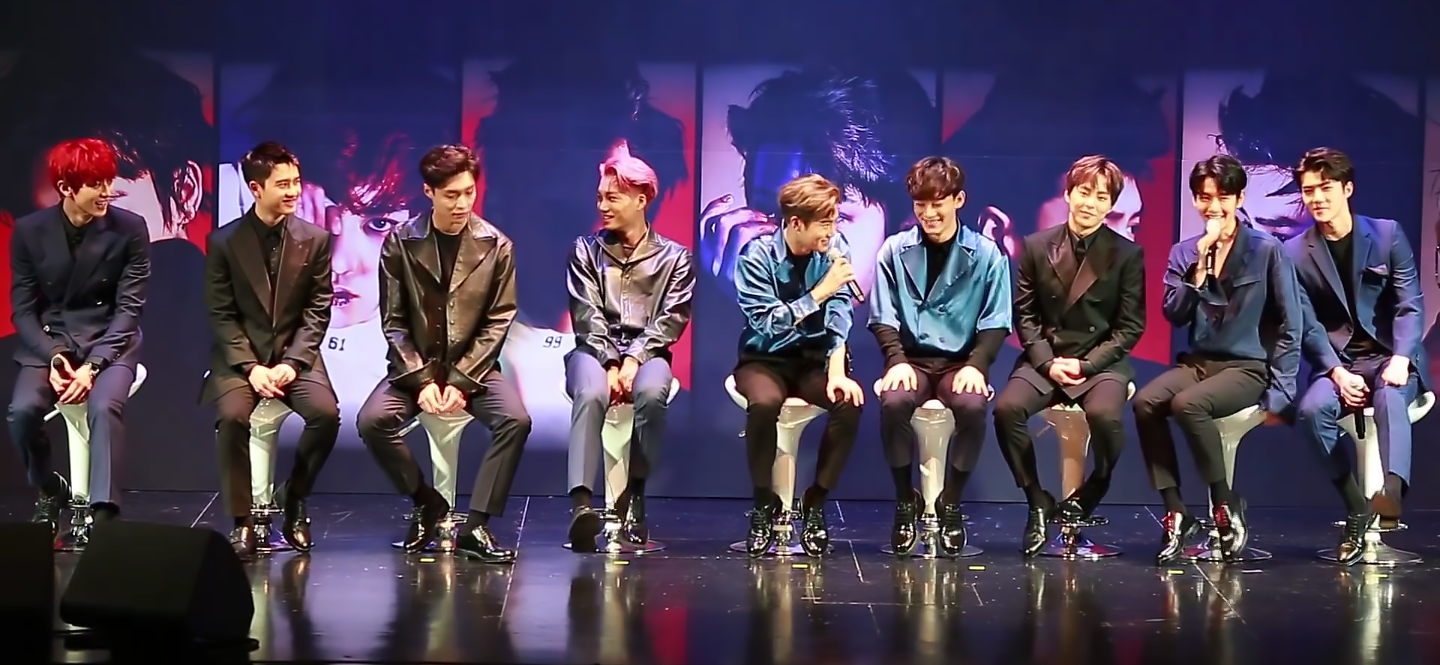
Exo at Ex'act release press conference in June 2016

Exo's third studio album Ex'Act and its singles "Lucky One" and "Monster" were released on June 9, 2016, with both Korean and Mandarin versions. The album broke the record for the highest first-week sales of a Korean album, previously set by the band's own fourth EP Sing For You. "Monster" became Exo's first number one on the Billboard World Digital Songs chart. On August 18, a repackaged edition of the album, titled Lotto, was released; it added four new songs, including the single of the same name. Within two months of its original release, the two editions combined sold over 1.17 million copies, making Ex'Act Exo's third million seller album and earning the group the title of "triple million sellers".

On July 21, 2016, contractual disputes between Kris and Luhan and SM Entertainment were settled and both members left the group. On July 22, Exo embarked on its third headlining tour, Exoplanet 3 – The Exo'rdium, with a record six consecutive concerts at the Olympic Gymnastics Arena.

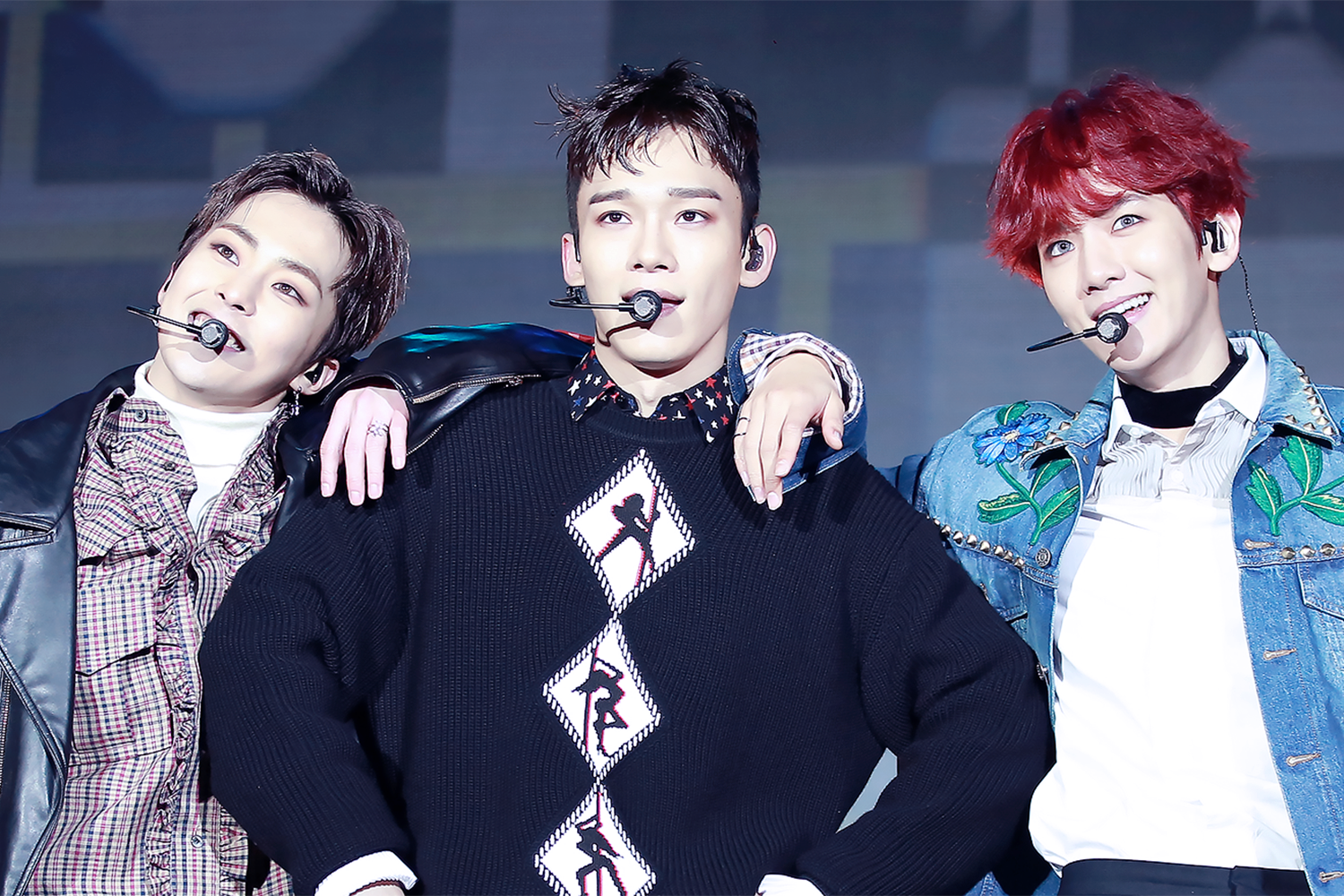
Exo-CBX at their debut showcase in Seoul on October 31, 2016

In late 2016, the group members spent time advancing their solo careers. On October 28, Lay released his debut EP, Lose Control. Chen, Baekhyun, and Xiumin debuted in the group's first sub-unit, Exo-CBX, releasing their first EP Hey Mama! on October 31.

On December 7, 2016, Exo released their second Japanese single, "Coming Over". Selling over 158,000 copies, it reached number two on the Oricon weekly chart and became the band's second Japanese single to receive a platinum certification from the Recording Industry Association of Japan. Exo's third winter release and fifth EP For Life was released on December 19.

On May 28, 2017, the tour ended with the second of two consecutive concerts at the Seoul Olympic Stadium, the largest stadium in South Korea. The tour brought the band's total number of concerts to over 100. In June 2017, Lay announced he would not take part in the band's next album and would instead focus on his acting career.

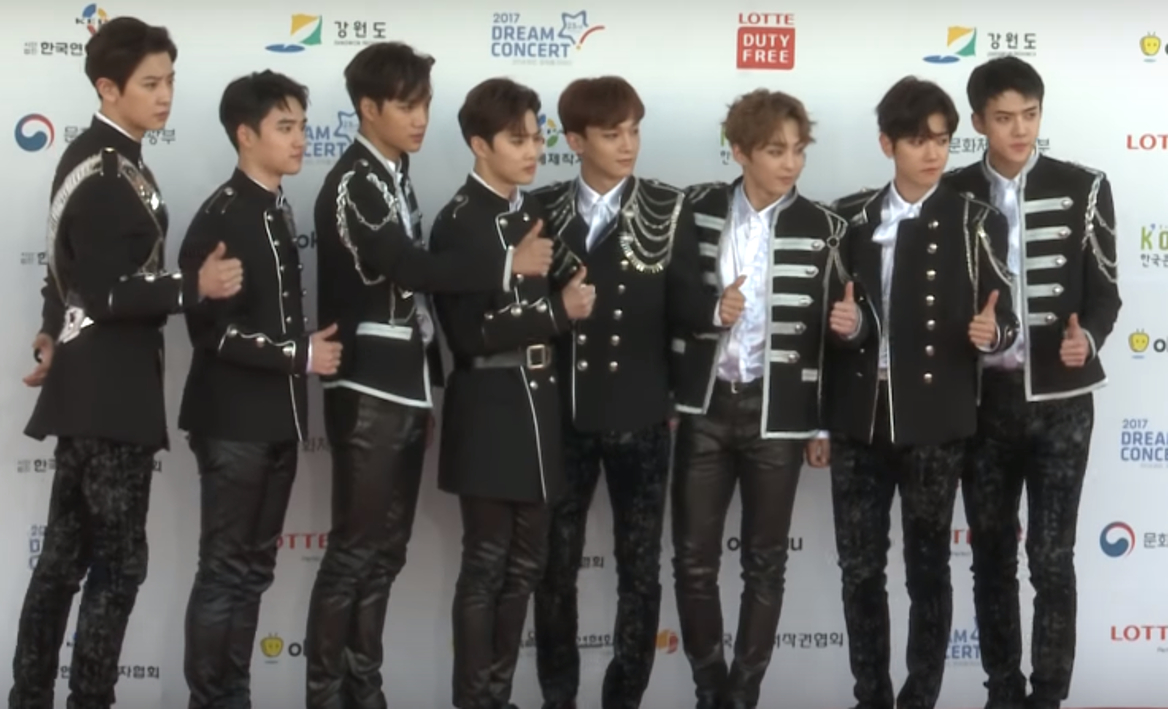
Exo at the Dream Concert in June 2017

Exo's fourth studio album The War was released on July 18, 2017. The album received 807,235 pre-orders, surpassing the band's own record of 660,000 for Ex'Act. On August 29, the 2018 edition of the Guinness World Records named Exo as having won the "Most Daesang" awards at the Mnet Asian Music Awards. On September 5, the group released a repackaged edition of The War, titled The War: The Power of Music. The re-issue added three new songs to the tracklist, including the single "Power". Exo began their third world tour, Exo Planet #4 – The Elyxion, with three consecutive nights at Seoul's Gocheok Sky Dome, beginning on November 24. As of November 30, Korean sales of The War reportedly reached nearly 1.6 million copies, making it Exo's best selling album at the time and earning the group the title of "quadruple million sellers" from the media. In early December, Exo announced their fourth special winter release and sixth EP, Universe. It was originally due for release on December 21 but was delayed until December 26 after the death of labelmate, Jonghyun.

=== 2018–2019: International recognition and first Japanese studio album ===
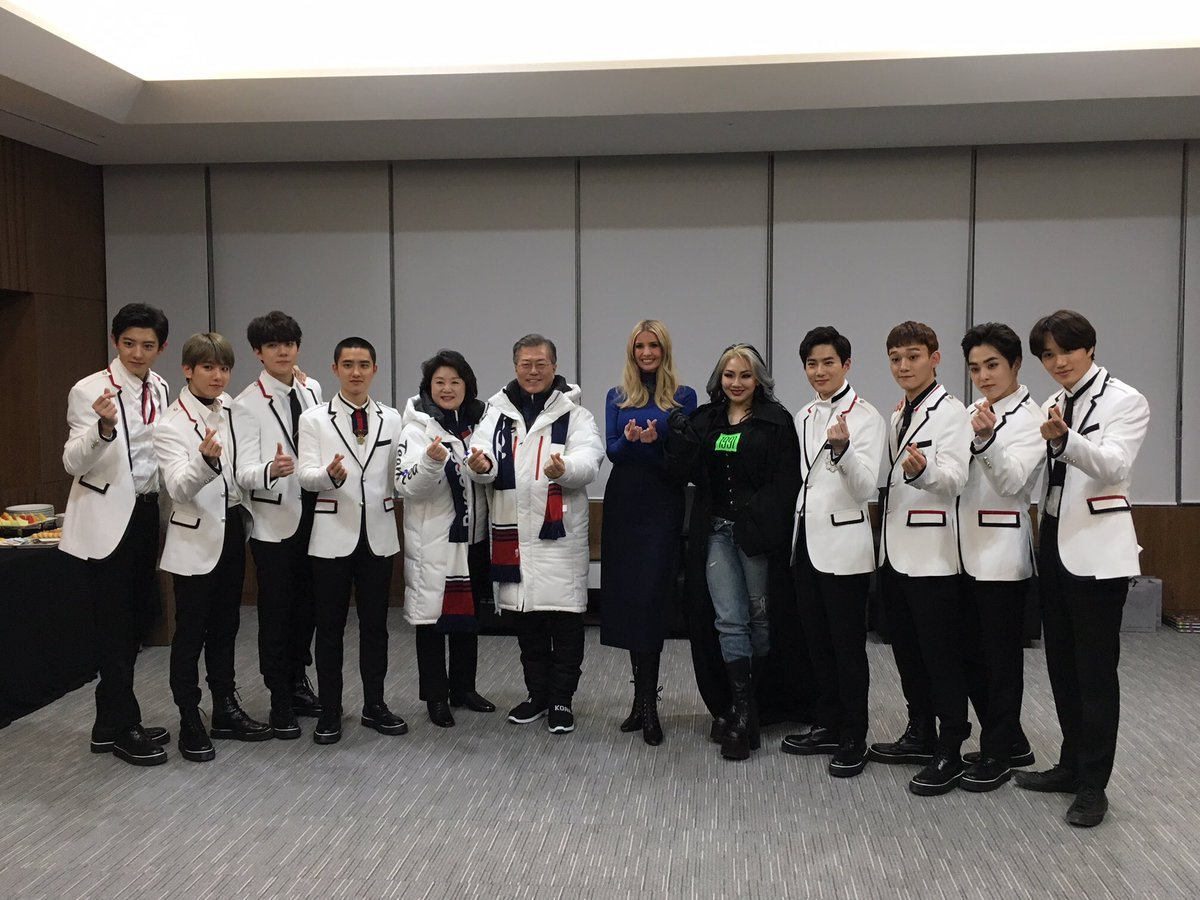
Exo with the President of South Korea, Moon Jae-in, Ivanka Trump and CL at the 2018 Winter Olympics in February 2018

On January 16, 2018, "Power" became the first K-pop song to play at The Dubai Fountain at Burj Khalifa Lake, Dubai; seven members of the group traveled to Dubai to view the first showing. The song's initial run was extended from January to March; it was also brought back from September until November of the same year. On January 31, Exo released their first Japanese studio album, Countdown. The album debuted at number one on the Oricon weekly chart, selling approximately 89,000 copies. The achievement made Exo the first non-Japanese band whose debut single and debut studio albums both reached number one on the Oricon weekly chart.

Exo performed at the closing ceremony of the 2018 Winter Olympics in Pyeongchang on February 25, serving as representatives of K-pop along with CL. Prior to the performance, Baekhyun sang the national anthem at the opening ceremony of the International Olympic Committee general assembly on February 5, and Exo performed at the official D-100 Concert in late 2017, which marked 100 days until the start of the Winter Olympics. The band's performance drew widespread global media attention and praise. The Russian two time Olympic silver medalist and figure skating world champion Evgenia Medvedeva also drew media attention for her support of Exo. In April 2018, the Korean Mint Corporation released official commemorative medals for Exo, honoring the group for their contribution to the global spread of Korean culture. The nine medals, each commemorating one of the group's members, were unveiled at a ceremony in Seoul.

Exo's fifth studio album, Don't Mess Up My Tempo, was released on November 2, 2018. Don't Mess Up My Tempo featured all nine Exo members—the group's first release to do so since Lotto in 2016. The album was a commercial success, selling 1,179,997 copies by November 30 and making Exo "quintuple million sellers" in the media. With the release of Don't Mess Up My Tempo, Exo became the first artist to surpass 10 million total album sales in South Korea. Love Shot was released on December 13, a repacked version of Don't Mess Up My Tempo. The lead single, also titled "Love Shot", became Exo's third number one single on the Billboard World Digital Songs chart and held the position for three consecutive weeks. Chen became the second Exo member to debut as a soloist with the EP April, and a Flower, which was released in April 2019. Baekhyun debuted as the group's third soloist with the release of his EP, City Lights, on July 10. Chanyeol and Sehun debuted as Exo's second official sub-unit, Exo-SC, and released their first EP, What a Life, in July. Baekhyun and Kai represented Exo in SM Entertainment's supergroup SuperM. Exo embarked on their fifth headlining tour, Exo Planet 5 – Exploration, with six dates in Seoul from July 19 to 28, totaling to thirty-one shows. Exo's sixth studio album, Obsession, was released on November 27, 2019. The group debuted several songs from the album live through Exo Planet 5 – Exploration encore concerts in December 2019, which also served as the tour's concluding shows.

=== 2020–2021: Focus on solo activities and group's special album ===
In February 2020, SM Entertainment revealed that Exo would prioritize solo and sub-unit activities in 2020 due to multiple members being on hiatus to fulfill their mandatory military service. Suho became the fourth member to debut as a soloist with his EP Self-Portrait, released on March 30, 2020. Baekhyun and Kai returned to activities with SuperM for the group's first studio album, Super One. Kai debuted as the group's fifth soloist with his self-titled EP on November 30, 2020.

Prior to the enlistments of Chanyeol and Baekhyun, the active members recorded Exo's next album in secret. In a video celebrating their ninth anniversary on April 8, 2021, the group showcased the filming of their upcoming music video and announced that they were preparing for the album to be released in the first half of the year, which would mark Xiumin and D.O.'s return to the group. Lay also participated in the album, marking his first activities with Exo since Don't Mess Up My Tempo. The group's seventh extended play, the "special album" Don't Fight the Feeling, was released on June 7. D.O. debuted as the group's sixth soloist with his EP Empathy on July 26, 2021.

=== 2022–present: Debut anniversary ===
Exo celebrated their tenth anniversary on April 8, 2022, through the premiere of a new season of their reality show Exo's Ladder, released through the streaming service Wavve, as well as a special fan meeting, titled 2022 Debut Anniversary Fan Event, on April 9, 2022, at the Jamsil Arena, which marked their first show with a live audience since the beginning of the COVID-19 pandemic. Following the completion of his contract with SM Entertainment, Lay announced his departure from the company. He clarified that he would remain active as a member of Exo. Xiumin became the seventh member to debut as a soloist with his extended play Brand New on September 26, 2022.

On January 5, 2023, Suho announced that the group is set to release new music after spring. Exo celebrated their 11th debut anniversary with a fan meeting, titled "2023 Exo Fanmeeting 'Exo' Clock", at the KSPO Dome from April 8 to 9, 2023. On June 1, 2023, it was announced that Chen, Baekhyun, and Xiumin were terminating their contracts with SM and filed a joint lawsuit against SM in regards to transparency of earnings. Despite this, SM confirmed that the group would continue filming their comeback MV, while also including Kai despite his military service. In response to SM, it was confirmed that Chen, Baekhyun, and Xiumin were exploring ways to continue promoting as Exo members following the results of the lawsuit. On June 19, SM Entertainment and Exo members Chen, Baekhyun, and Xiumin jointly announced that both parties had resolved the contract dispute, and the members had decided to stay with the company.

Exo's seventh studio album, Exist, was released on July 10, 2023. Exist is the group's first album to be promoted as a seven-member group, as member Kai had been undergoing mandatory military service, and member Lay is promoting his solo activities in China. D.O. departed SM Entertainment following the expiration of his contract in November, though he would still be continuing his activities with Exo. He then signed with Company Soosoo for his solo activities. In January 2024, Baekhyun announced to have started his own company, INB100, and recruited Xiumin and Chen to join his label. SM announced later on that while Xiumin, Baekhyun, and Chen are still contracted under the label for group activities, they can proceed with solo activities under their new company.

On October 27, 2025, SM Entertainment announced that Exo's eighth studio album would be released within the first quarter of 2026. Member Lay would return, while members Xiumin, Baekhyun, and Chen would be excluded from the release. Hours before the group's first fanmeet for the album, it was announced that Lay would not be taking part due to "unavoidable circumstances".

On January 19, 2026, Exo released their eighth full album Reverxe, their first release in 2 years and 6 months. Due to ongoing contract disputes with the members of Exo-CBX, only Suho, Chanyeol, D.O., Kai, Sehun, and Lay participated in this album's activities, though Lay has been absent from promotions due to "unavoidable circumstances." Reverxe is nine tracks long, including its lead single "Crown".

== Members ==
On May 15, 2014, Kris Wu stopped promoting with Exo and its subunit, Exo-M, as a result of the lawsuit he filed against SM Entertainment. Luhan followed on October 10, 2014. Both members formally left the group on July 21, 2016. Tao went on an official hiatus during Exodus promotions due to injury and filed a lawsuit against SM on August 15, 2015, formally leaving Exo on March 15, 2018. Following Tao's lawsuit, Exo promoted their albums as a full group rather than in two sub-groups. On October 27, 2025, SM confirmed that Chen, Baekhyun, and Xiumin would not be taking part in promotions for Exo's eighth album as a result of their ongoing lawsuit against the company.

On June 13, 2017, SM Entertainment announced Lay would not be participating in activities for the group's upcoming album due to conflicting schedules with his solo activities. Lay did not return to active participation in Exo until 2021, although he did contribute vocals to the Chinese version of their song "Tempo" in 2018. On May 26, 2021, Lay was reported to be returning to the group to take part in their special album, Don't Fight the Feeling. Lay participated in each of the songs on Don't Fight the Feeling and was featured in the music video for the lead single of the same name. He also took part in the group's eighth album Reverxe, though as of January 2026, he has not taken part in promotional events due to "unavoidable circumstances."

On May 7, 2019, Xiumin became the first member of the group to participate in mandatory military service and was discharged on December 6, 2020. On July 1, 2019, D.O. enlisted for his service, which he completed on January 25, 2021. Suho enlisted on May 14, 2020, and completed his service on February 13, 2022, followed by Chen, who enlisted on October 26, 2020, and completed his service on April 25, 2022. Chanyeol enlisted on March 29, 2021, and was discharged on September 28, 2022. Baekhyun enlisted on May 6, 2021, and completed his service on February 5, 2023. Kai enlisted on May 11, 2023. and was discharged on February 10, 2025. Sehun was the final member to enlist on December 21, 2023; he was discharged on September 20, 2025.

Current (active)

- Suho (수호; 金俊勉) – leader
- Chanyeol (찬열; 朴燦烈)
- D.O. (디오; 都敬秀)
- Kai (카이; 金鍾仁)
- Sehun (세훈; 吳世勳)

Current (inactive)

- Xiumin (시우민; 金珉錫; inactive due to legal disputes)
- Lay (레이; 张艺兴; inactive due to unavoidable circumstances)
- Baekhyun (백현; 邊伯賢; inactive due to legal disputes)
- Chen (첸; 金鍾大; inactive due to legal disputes)

Former

- Luhan (루한; 鹿晗)
- Kris (크리스; 吴亦凡)
- Tao (타오; 黄子韬)

== Sub-units ==
=== Exo-CBX ===
In October 2016, SM Entertainment formed the group's first sub-unit, Exo-CBX (also known as Chen-Baek-Xi), which is composed of three members: Chen, Baekhyun, and Xiumin. Exo-CBX has released one studio album: Magic (2018) and three extended plays: Hey Mama! (2016), Girls (2017), and Blooming Days (2018).

=== Exo-SC ===
In July 2019, SM Entertainment formed the group's second sub-unit, Exo-SC, which is composed of members Sehun and Chanyeol. Exo-SC has released one studio album: 1 Billion Views (2020) and one extended play: What a Life (2019).

=== Exo-KASE ===
In November 2026, SM Entertainment announced Exo-KASE, a new sub-unit consisting of Kai and Sehun. The duo's debut mini album, Waking Up the City, is scheduled to be released on December 1.

== Artistry ==
=== Musical style ===
Exo are considered by many to be a vocal powerhouse group in the K-pop industry. In particular, the group's three main vocalists D.O., Chen, and Baekhyun have received praise from industry figures and the media. The special winter-themed EPs that Exo have released nearly every December since 2013 feature classic, emotional ballads that diverge from the upbeat singles usually featured on the band's studio albums and better showcase the members' vocal abilities. Billboard applauded the band's single "Universe" from the 2017 EP of the same name, stating, "With soaring, emotive vocals courtesy of the Exo members, 'Universe' is a power ballad that showcases the group's strengths."

Most of Exo's songs blend pop, hip-hop, and R&B with electronic dance music genres such as house and trap and are produced with onstage performance in mind. The group has frequently worked with veteran Korean and international producers, including Kenzie, Dean, LDN Noise, The Underdogs, and MARZ Music. Producer Harvey Mason Jr. commented: "We listen to their material ... and try and go one step further. We try and do things that are fresh and original but yet still sound like Exo ...They can sing, they can dance, they have the energy ... It's like a painter having every color to paint with."

Early in their career, Exo were described by Billboard as sounding "wholly inspired by the late '90s/early '00s sound ... with bigger beats, loads more hooks and adding rap and dance breakdowns." The group explored a more "mature" and "dark" sound in 2016 with the release of their third studio album, Ex'Act, which was marked by an increased use of synth-pop and electronic dance music styles such as house. Their fourth studio album, The War, deepened the group's sonic experimentation, featuring elements of trap music prominently for the first time. With the album's lead single "Ko Ko Bop", Exo received praise for unconventionally hybridizing laid-back reggae sounds with heavy electronic breaks.

=== Songwriting ===
The members of Exo faced criticism early in their careers because of their lack of involvement in the writing and producing of their songs. However, in 2015, Exo released their first song to credit lyrics to one of the group's members on the repackaged version of their second album, Love Me Right. "Promise (Exo 2014)" was written by Chanyeol, Chen, and Lay and was a "special gift" to the fans, with lyrics thanking them for their support. Since then, Exo have released multiple songs featuring lyrical contributions from the band's members, including "Heaven" and "She's Dreaming" from their third album, the special promotional single "Lightsaber", and most notably, the hit single "Ko Ko Bop" among others from their 2017 album The War.

In a 2017 interview with Billboard, Chanyeol spoke about his contributions to the lyrics for "Chill", stating that because he "worked on the lyrics with an empty track without demo lyrics", the process came more "naturally" to him. Chen explained the process of writing their single "Ko Ko Bop": "[we] wrote the lyrics separately and worked on putting [them] together for the song afterwards. I don't think I have any regrets [about the song] since it's the best result produced through all the effort that our members and other writers have put into the process." Chen was also credited with writing the Korean lyrics for the track "Lights Out" from Exo's fourth special winter EP, Universe. Member Lay is also a songwriter and producer, having written and composed all tracks on his solo albums, as well for other artists. Chanyeol participated in writing lyrics for "Gravity" and 'With You", both on Exo's sixth studio album Don't Mess Up My Tempo.

=== Stage ===
Exo have been praised for their synchronized choreography and elaborate stage designs. The band was choreographed early in their career by American hip hop choreographers Tony Testa and Nicholas Bass for songs like "Wolf" and "Growl", respectively. More recently, Exo collaborated with choreographer Kim Tae Woo. Dazed admired the band's "seamless...knife-point choreography", saying it has put them "at the forefront of pop domination". A recurring stage element on the group's world tours has been the use of water in the form of rain and shallow pools. Cleo noted that Exo's "winning formula" was the incorporation of water into their choreography, describing the water "cascading from above during 'White Noise' and 'Lightsaber'" that "saw some of the members getting drenched." Yahoo wrote that "during one segment, the boys stood on an elevated hexagon-shaped stage (modeled after the band's logo), and danced sensually while water rained down on them from above."

On their stage design, Music Mind noted Exo's use of "not only ... the stage-lights and the lightsticks, but also [a] multitude of special effects like water, flames, and fireworks, not to mention huge screens positioned both on the substage and across the whole perimeter of the venue". Rappler journalist Keb Cuevas described Exo's "multi-LED screen stage fitted with holographic Exo embellishments and choreographed laser lighting", saying "the stage was literally on fire as pyrotechnic effects were ignited with the electronic beat." Covering a 2018 concert in Singapore, Bandwagon remarked that after their "fourth headlining tour [in] four years ... you might [assume] their setlist and stages would be repetitive and stale. But [that] was not the case at all."

== Impact ==
With the release of their debut studio album in 2013, Exo became the first South Korean artist in 12 years to sell over one million copies of an album; the previous artist to reach this milestone was g.o.d, in 2001. Following the release of their fifth studio album, Don't Mess Up My Tempo, Exo became the first South Korean artist who debuted in the 21st century to sell 10 million albums cumulatively. In 2023, Exo became "septuple million sellers", meaning the band has sold over one million copies apiece for seven different albums.

Exo have also contributed significantly to the financial success of their management agency, SM Entertainment. In the fourth quarter of 2018, SM Entertainment recorded the largest-ever quarterly profit for any South Korean entertainment company at $13.4 million. Exo generated the highest revenue of all SM artists, at 31% of the total $188 million fourth quarter revenue.

Exo have been described by Dazed as "the biggest boy band in the world", and have been referred to as the "Nation's Pick" by the Korea Tourism Organization. They have also been referred to as the "Kings of K-pop" by international outlets Vogue, PageOne and South Korean outlets such as OBS. Exo have gained immense popularity in South Korea and were named by Forbes on the Korea Power Celebrity 40 list as the most powerful celebrities in South Korea for 2015 and 2016; within the top five for 2014, 2017, and 2018; and within the top 10 for 2019. They are considered a prominent force in the Hallyu Wave, which refers to the rise and spread of Korean pop culture around the world. When discussing the significance of Exo in a global context, Bustle described them as "the ultimate K-pop sensation": "there's really nothing quite like Exo." Vulture described Exo as "leaders of a K-pop generation" when describing the band's ability to consistently release music in the Korean and Chinese markets while continuing to impress in the United States with Billboard chartings and arena tours. Similarly, Dazed considered Exo's success to be that of "a continent-straddling pop juggernaut". In 2016, AsiaOne said "Exo are turning into an omnipresent, unstoppable global force," citing their worldwide popularity, critical acclaim, and large fandom size.

In April 2018, Forbes described Exo as one of the two artists worldwide (alongside fellow K-pop band BTS) that dramatically over-perform on social media, even exceeding the reach of American artists such as Beyonce, Justin Bieber and Taylor Swift. Twitter statistics from Next Big Sound showed that Exo recorded 14,000 times more mentions than expected, with 24 million in total. In addition, Exo ranked second on the Billboard Social 50 Year-End Chart from 2018 through 2020. Exo's work has influenced numerous artists, including MVP, Kim Dong-han, NCT 127, Wanna One, Ong Seong-wu and Kang Daniel.

== Awards and achievements ==
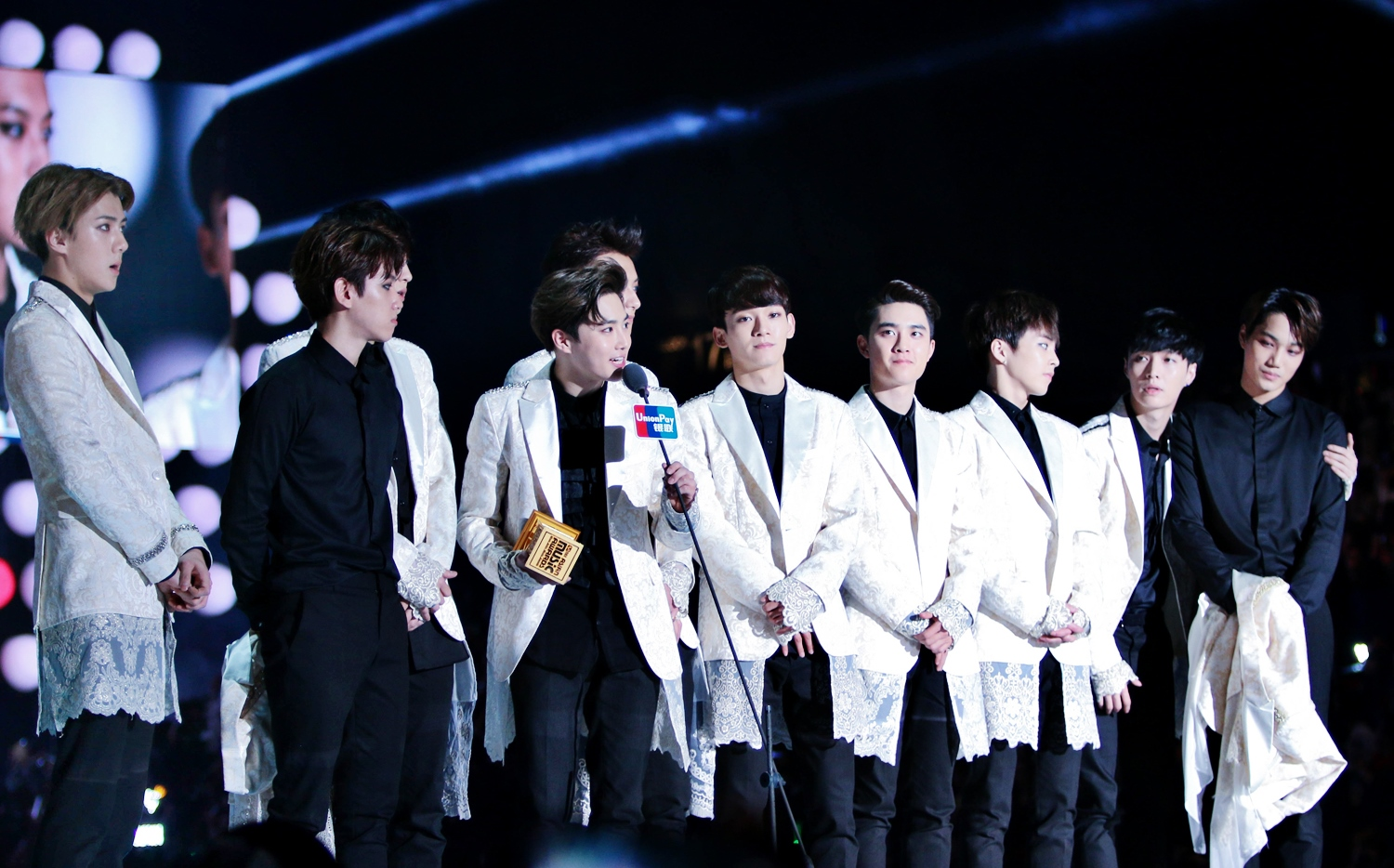
Exo at the 16th Mnet Asian Music Awards in December 2014

Exo have won numerous awards both in South Korea and internationally. The band earned their first-ever music show win in June 2013 for their single "Wolf" on the South Korean music program Music Bank. For four years, Exo held the record for the most music show wins for a single song, with 18 for "Call Me Baby" (2015). The band have won over 100 music program awards cumulatively, becoming the second act to do so after their label-mates Girls' Generation. Exo have received 23 Daesang (Note: A daesang (Korean: 대상), which translates to "grand prize", is the highest honor given out at South Korean music award ceremonies in recognition of the artist(s) with the greatest physical and digital achievements for the year.) awards from various year-end award shows, including six from the Mnet Asian Music Awards, a feat that was recorded in the 2018 Guinness World Records book.

On November 3, 2017, Exo received a Prime Minister Commendation at the Korean Popular Culture and Arts Awards, an honor bestowed in recognition of public service and/or excellence in a given field. When receiving the award, Suho said: "We have received such a big award alongside brilliant people ... It's such a huge honor. We will become performers who promote not only K-pop, but also Korea."

== Other ventures ==
=== Endorsements ===
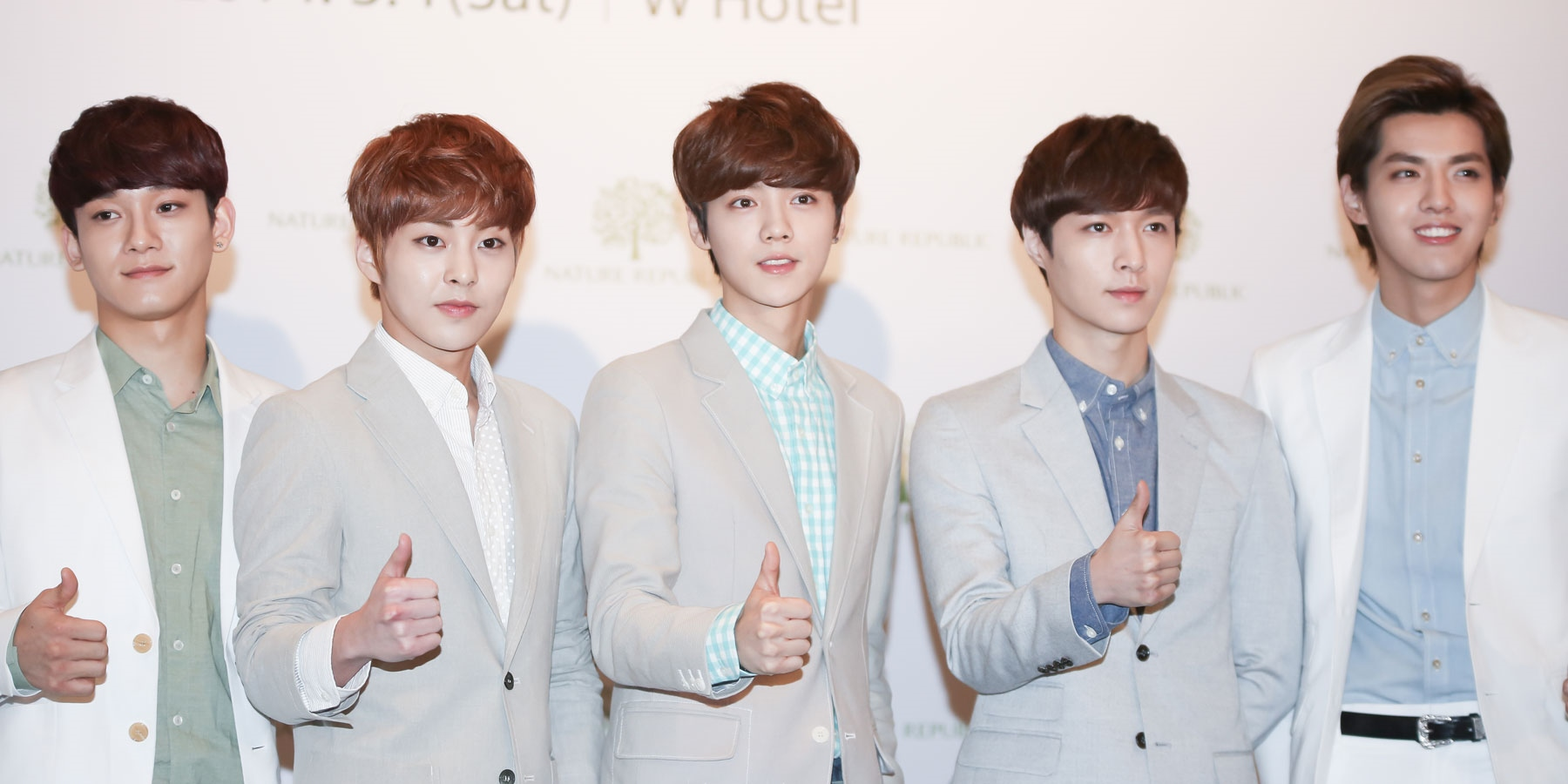
EXO-M at Nature Republic's press conference

Exo has maintained numerous endorsement deals throughout the group's career, and has been named multiple times as having the most powerful brand reputation among K-pop artists by the Korean Business Research Institute. Exo has endorsed Samsung's electronic products and served as the company's brand ambassadors for the 2014 Summer Youth Olympics in China. In 2014, Exo collaborated with the South Korean clothing brand Kolon Sport on a new pair of sneakers named Move-Xo after the group. Also in 2013, Exo began a two-year endorsement deal with cosmetics brand Nature Republic, which was later extended and remained active until 2020. Their partnership grew in 2015 and 2016 to include autograph events, which drew 30,000 and 50,000 fans, respectively. These events were followed by the Green Nature Exo Fan Festival in 2018 and 2019; both were concert-style events hosted by Nature Republic with thousands of attendees.

In late 2015, Exo officially endorsed Star Wars: The Force Awakens with the release of a collaboration film that featured "the nine Exo members in a Star Wars-inspired world where clubs are 'Jedi Only' and they carry lightsabers", according to Billboard. In 2016, the group became ambassadors for American footwear company Skechers, endorsing the D'Lites 2 Sweet Monster Collection, which became known as the "Exo's sneakers". Also in 2016, the group became the official faces of international clothing brand SPAO's spring collection, which included limited-edition postcards and posters for customers.

In 2018, in the lead-up to Exo's performance at the closing ceremony for the 2018 Winter Olympics, the group became the faces of the Switzerland-based snow-sports company Kessler. In March 2018, Exo were announced to be the new brand ambassadors for Major League Baseball (MLB) in Asia. Following this announcement, Chanyeol, Kai, and Sehun attended the grand opening of the MLB store in Times Square, Hong Kong, on March 23. In July 2018, Exo were appointed as Korean Tourism Ambassadors for 2018 by the Korean Tourism Organization, and appeared in a series of promotional advertisements designed to "promote Korea to the world". Exo also maintain partnerships with, or have previously endorsed, companies including Coca-Cola, SK Telecom, KFC, MCM, Lotte Confectionery, Lotte World, Goobne Chicken, and Hats On.

=== Philanthropy ===
The members of Exo-K became goodwill ambassadors for South Korea's Red Cross Youth in December 2012. Members of Exo were appointed as official ambassadors for Fashion-KODE 2014, which was hosted by South Korea's Ministry of Culture, Sports and Tourism and the Korea Active Content Agency Fashion Festival in July 2014. That same month, Samsung announced Exo as its brand ambassadors for the 2014 Summer Youth Olympics. Since their debut, Exo members have been involved in charity, such as volunteering for and making personal donations to organizations including childcare centers, the Korea Childhood Leukemia Foundation, Siheung Women's Resources Development Center, and China's Hunan province medical services.

In 2015, Exo began participating in Smile For U, a joint SM Entertainment and UNICEF project that supports music education for children in Asia. Part of the proceeds from the band's second special winter release Sing for You and multiple subsequent albums were donated to the campaign.

== Discography ==
Korean and Chinese albums

- XOXO (2013)
- Exodus (2015)
- Ex'Act (2016)
- The War (2017)

Korean-exclusive albums

- Don't Mess Up My Tempo (2018)
- Obsession (2019)
- Exist (2023)
- Reverxe (2026)

Japanese albums

- Countdown (2018)

== Tours ==
Headlining

- Exo from Exoplanet 1 – The Lost Planet (2014)
- Exo Planet 2 – The Exo'luxion (2015–2016)
- Exo Planet 3 – The Exo'rdium (2016–2017)
- Exo Planet 4 – The Elyxion (2017–2018)
- Exo Planet 5 – Exploration (2019)
- Exo Planet 6 – Exhorizon (2026)

Joint tours

- SM Town Live World Tour III (2012–2013)
- SM Town Live World Tour IV (2014–2015)
- SM Town Live World Tour V (2016)
- SM Town Live World Tour VI (2017–2018)

Supporting act

- Super Junior – Super Show 4 (Exo-M only) (2012)

== Filmography ==
Selected filmography

- Exo's Showtime
- XOXO Exo
- Exo 90:2014
- Exo Next Door
