= The Fair =

The Fair may refer to:

- The Fair (film), a 1960 German drama
- The Fair Store, in Illinois, US

== See also ==
- List of people known as the Fair
