= Exodus (Exo album) =

- Korean digital cover

Studio album by Exo
- Released: March 30, 2015
- Recorded: 2014–2015
- Studios: Doobdoob (Seoul); Iconic Sounds (Seoul); In Grid (Seoul); SM Blue Cup (Seoul); SM Blue Ocean (Seoul); Sound Pool (Seoul)
- Genres: K-pop; R&B
- Length: 37:14; 53:10 (Love Me Right repackage)
- Languages: Korean; Mandarin; English
- Labels: SM; KT Music
- Producer: Lee Soo-man

Exo chronology
Exology Chapter 1: The Lost Planet (2014)	Exodus (2015)	Sing for You (2015)

Singles from Exodus
- 1. "Call Me Baby" Released: March 30, 2015

Repackaged edition cover
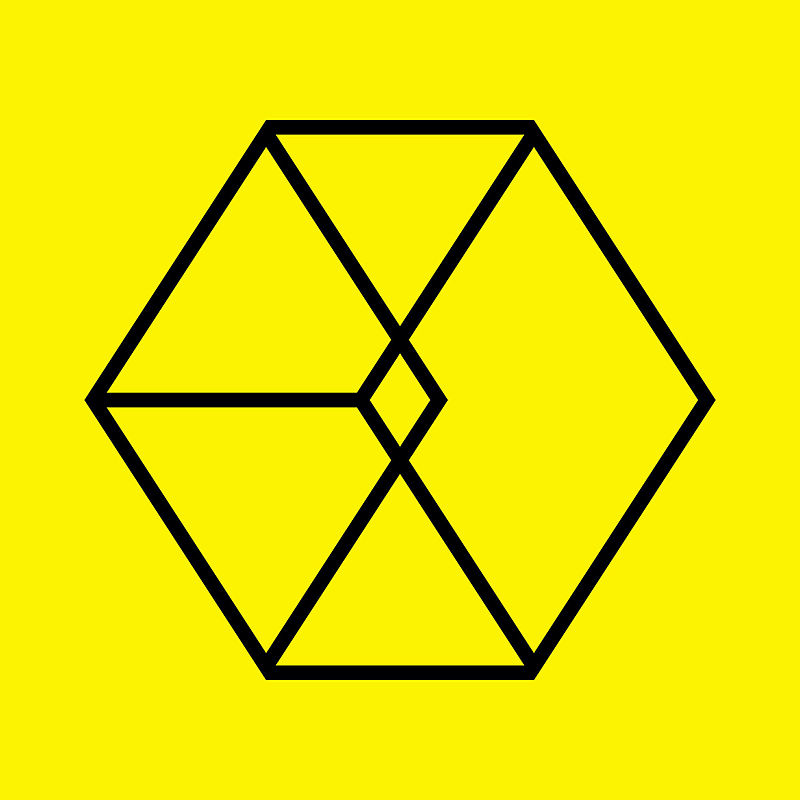
- Korean digital cover

Singles from Love Me Right
- 1. "Love Me Right" Released: June 3, 2015

Exodus (stylized in all caps) is the second studio album by South Korean boy band Exo. It was released on March 30, 2015, by SM Entertainment and distributed by KT Music. The album was re-released as Love Me Right on June 3. The album was a commercial success in South Korea upon its release, with XOXO and its repackage selling over 750,000 copies and 370,000 copies according to Gaon, respectively. (Note: This record was set after the Gaon Music Chart began tracking album sales since 2010. In September 2000, Jo Sung-mo's third studio album Let Me Love sold more than 1.7 million copies during its initial month of release.)

This is the first album to not feature Kris and Luhan, as they both filed lawsuits against SM Entertainment and left the group back in of May and October 2014 respectively. It was the last album to have the group divided into Exo-K and Exo-M units. This is also the last album to feature Tao, as he suspended his activity a month later, and on August of that same year, filed a lawsuit against SM Entertainment, thereby departing the group.

== Background ==
Before the album's release, SM Entertainment held a press conference, in which all the members were present except Lay, who was in China focusing on his then-upcoming film. Suho also stated that he had never thought about the sales numbers after the release of the album, and just wanted to bring new music to fans of the band. He said that the only thing on the members' mind whilst making the album was for the listeners to enjoy it. He also concluded by saying that it would be a new start for Exo, after the lawsuits of former band members Luhan and Kris, and that the members would show a brighter, fresher side to their fans.

The album features the lyrics from the likes of Teddy Riley and also Shinee's Jonghyun who wrote the lyrics of the song "Playboy". There are 10 songs that span a number of genres including dance, R&B, and ballad. Exo stated that 20 different covers of the album would be released, both online and in physical copies. Each member would be featured on their own cover on the album, in both a Korean and Chinese version. The Korean versions were colored gold while the Chinese versions were silver. When aligned, the spines of all the albums together would create their new logo.

== Release and promotion ==
Exodus' promotional campaign kicked off with a mysterious teaser video on YouTube, featuring member, Kai, titled 'Pathcode: KAI', released on March 18, 2015. At the time of the video's release, Exo launched a Twitter account with the username @PathcodeEXO which featured cryptic tweets such as mysterious riddles related to the videos published per member. This created fan engagement as they came up with their own theories which are related to Exo's lore.

Every answer to the hints tweeted on @PathcodeEXO served as a password to Exo's promotional site. Once unlocked, fans can access the teaser photos and other content for the member featured in the Pathcode teaser video dropped on the same date.

Each Pathcode videos feature the members in various regions and countries around the world including North America, Europe, and China, accompanied by cryptic symbols and imagery, and featured their respective superpowers. Some teaser videos also featured a snippet of instrumental versions of the album's B-side tracks in the background such as "My Answer" in Lay's teaser video, "El Dorado" in Baekhyun's, and "Hurt" in Xiumin's.

The first letter of the Exo members' location in the Pathcode teaser videos would spell out the album's lead single "Call Me Baby". Despite the teasers not being released in order, fans pointed out that the words 'call me' and 'baby' are spelled out by the EXO-K and EXO-M members' location, respectively—Colorado (D.O.), Arizona (Chanyeol), London (Kai), Lyon (Baekhyun), Marseille (Suho), Edinburgh (Sehun), Barcelona (Tao), Almaty (Chen), Berlin (Xiumin), and Yunnan (Lay).

=== Live performances ===
Exo held their comeback stage for "Call Me Baby" on M Countdown (Mnet) where they co-operated their energetic choreography in various different stage locations. Along with the lead single, the band performed "My Answer" both on M! Countdown and Music Bank (KBS), and the title track both on Show! Music Core (MBC) and Inkigayo (SBS). Exo won their first award on Inkigayo aired on April 5, 2015. Promotions for the album were wrapped up by the band's performances on The Show (SBS MTV) aired on April 28, 2015. Exo received a total of 18 music show trophies for "Call Me Baby", breaking their own record previously held for "Growl" (14 trophies).

== Commercial performance ==
According to SM Entertainment, pre-orders for Exodus reached 502,440 copies (321,200 in Korean and 181,240 in Chinese), already passing the half million mark. Domestically, the Korean version of the album topped the Gaon Weekly Albums Chart for four consecutive weeks, while its Chinese counterpart reached the runner-up position. Both versions occupied the first two spots until their third week of release. Later, the Korean version of its repackaged edition Love Me Right stayed atop the chart for two straight weeks. Exodus became the best-selling album in the first quarter of 2015, only two days after its release on March 30.

In Japan, both albums entered the top 10 of the Oricon Weekly Albums Chart, peaking at numbers four (Korean) and seven (Chinese), respectively. The combined version of the album sold over 6,000 copies in the United States and charted at number 95 on the Billboard 200 in its initial week of release. In doing so, Exodus became the second best-selling K-pop album in the region as well as the second highest-charting album by a K-pop group in the country (only behind 2NE1's Crush). The album also topped Billboard's World Albums Chart on the issue date of April 18, 2015, and stayed in the top 10 for six consecutive weeks. With the pre-order sales figures for Love Me Right combined, the album's total sales surpassed one million units globally.

== Singles ==
SM Entertainment released the song "First Love" on YouTube to give the fans a sneak peek. According to the members, it was a present for the fans after waiting patiently and bearing with the problems and struggles faced by the band, while still supporting them with their activities. The song was uploaded onto music sharing websites, but was then made private after 10 hours of uploading it.

The lead single for the album, "Call Me Baby", was released online on March 28, 2015, while the accompanying music videos of two versions (both in Korean and Chinese, respectively) came out three days later through a number of media. The Korean version of the single peaked at number two on the Gaon Singles Chart, while its Chinese counterpart reached number 36. It also entered the Canadian Hot 100 for the week of April 25, 2015, debuting and peaking at number 98. Since its release, "Call Me Baby" has sold almost 826,000 digital copies in South Korea, (Note: Sales for both versions are combined.) and 831,000 worldwide.

The Korean version of "Love Me Right", the lead single for the album's repackaged edition later topped the Gaon Singles Chart, becoming the band's second number-one hit in their native country following "December, 2014 (The Winter's Tale)" (see Exo discography). It has sold about 625,000 digital copies in South Korea. (Note: Sales for both versions are combined.) The songs "El Dorado" and "Beautiful" from the album, were previously used three years prior, when SM Entertainment released the teasers for the band members. The songs used then were only short drafts and clips from the songs and had no lyrics. "El Dorado" was used in Chanyeol's teaser, whilst the teaser for "Beautiful" starred the members Lay, Baekhyun and Chen.

== Accolades ==
Awards and nominations
Year	Award	Category	Nominated work	Result	Ref.
2015	Melon Music Awards	Album of the Year	Exodus	Won	
2015	Mnet Asian Music Awards	Album of the Year	Exodus	Won	
2015	Philippine K-pop Awards	Album of the Year	Exodus	Won	
2016	Gaon Chart K-Pop Awards	Album of the Year – 1st Quarter	Exodus	Won	
2016	Gaon Chart K-Pop Awards	Album of the Year – 2nd Quarter	Love Me Right	Won	
2016	Golden Disc Awards	Album Bonsang	Exodus	Won	
2016	Golden Disc Awards	Album Daesang	Exodus	Won	
2016	Seoul Music Awards	Best Album	Exodus	Nominated	
2016	V Chart Awards	Best Album – Korea	Exodus	Won	

== Track listing ==
Tracks 2–10 are performed by EXO-K.

Exodus (Korean version) track listing
No.	Title	Lyrics	Music	Arrangement	Length
1.	"Call Me Baby"	Jo Yoon-kyung; Jeon Ji-eun (January 8 (lalala Studio)); Hwang Seon-jeong (January 8 (lalala Studio)); Kim Jeong-mi (January 8 (lalala Studio)); Kim Dong-hyun	Teddy Riley (Red Rocket); Dominique "DOM" Rodriguez (Red Rocket); Lee Hyun-seung (Red Rocket); Jason J. Lopez; Dantae Johnson	Red Rocket; Jason J. Lopez; Dantae Johnson	3:31
2.	"Transformer"	Kenzie	Kenzie; Jonathan Yip; Jeremy Reeves; Ray Romulus; Ray McCullough	Kenzie; The Stereotypes	3:47
3.	"What If..." (시선 둘, 시선 하나; Siseon dul, siseon hana; 'Two gazes, one gaze')	Seo Ji-eum; The Underdogs	The Underdogs; Dewain Whitmore; Adonis Shropshire	The Underdogs; Dewain Whitmore; Adonis Shropshire	4:19
4.	"My Answer" (sung by Baekhyun, D.O., Suho)	Lee Joo-hyoung (MonoTree)	Lee Joo-hyoung (MonoTree)	Lee Joo-hyoung (MonoTree)	3:33
5.	"Exodus"	Jo Yoon-kyung	Albi Albertsson (Mussashi); Yuka Otsuki (Mussashi); Fabian Strangl	Mussashi	3:20
6.	"El Dorado"	Seo Ji-eum; Lee Yoo-jin; Im Kwang-wook (Devine Channel)	Seo Ji-eum; Lee Yoo-jin; Im Kwang-wook (Devine Channel); Andreas "Mage" Maggiani (Devine Channel); Im "Chase" Chae-seop (Devine Channel)	Devine Channel	3:59
7.	"Playboy"	Jonghyun	Jonghyun (Wefreaky)	Jonghyun; Tesung Kim (Iconic Sounds); Command Freaks (Iconic Sounds)	3:32
8.	"Hurt"	Seo Seung-hee (Soulsweet)	Albi Albertsson (Mussashi)	Mussashi	3:39
9.	"Lady Luck" (유성우; Yuseongu; 'Meteor shower')	Jo Yoon-kyung	Command Freaks (Iconic Sounds); Andreas Stone Johansson	Command Freaks (Iconic Sounds); Andreas Stone Johansson	3:33
10.	"Beautiful"	Lee Chae-yoon	Teddy Riley; Dominique "DOM" Rodriguez (Audity); Richard Garcia (Audity); Dantae Johnson; LaByron "Miko" Walton	Teddy Riley; Dominique "DOM" Rodriguez (Audity); Richard Garcia (Audity); Dantae Johnson; LaByron "Miko" Walton	4:03
Total length:					37:16

Exodus (Chinese version) track listing
No.	Title	Lyrics	Music	Arrangement	Length
1.	"Call Me Baby" (叫我)	Dae Ak Dong	Teddy Riley (Red Rocket); Dominique "DOM" Rodriguez (Red Rocket); Lee Hyun-seung (Red Rocket); Jason J. Lopez; Dantae Johnson	Red Rocket; Jason J. Lopez; Dantae Johnson	3:31
2.	"Transformer" (变形女)	T-Crash; Kenzie	Kenzie; Jonathan Yip; Jeremy Reeves; Ray Romulus; Ray McCullough	Kenzie; The Stereotypes	3:47
3.	"What If..." (两个视线, 一个视线)	黄贞颖 Annakid; Seo Ji-eum	The Underdogs; Dewain Whitmore; Adonis Shropshire	The Underdogs; Dewain Whitmore; Adonis Shropshire	4:18
4.	"My Answer" (我的答案; sung by Chen, Lay, D.O.)	Dae Ak Dong	Lee Joo-hyoung (MonoTree)	Lee Joo-hyoung (MonoTree)	3:33
5.	"Exodus" (逃脱)	Zhou Weijie	Albi Albertsson (Mussashi); Yuka Otsuki (Mussashi); Fabian Strangl	Mussashi	3:19
6.	"El Dorado" (黄金国)	Wang Yajun	Seo Ji-eum; Lee Yoo-jin; Im Kwang-wook (Devine Channel); Andreas "Mage" Maggiani (Devine Channel); Im "Chase" Chae-seop (Devine Channel)	Devine Channel	3:59
7.	"Playboy" (坏男孩)	Wang Yajun	Jonghyun (Wefreaky)	Jonghyun; Tesung Kim (Iconic Sounds); Command Freaks (Iconic Sounds)	3:32
8.	"Hurt" (伤害)	Seo Seung-hee (Soulsweet); Zhou Weijie	Albi Albertsson (Mussashi)	Mussashi	3:39
9.	"Lady Luck" (流星雨; with D.O.)	黄贞颖 Annakid	Command Freaks (Iconic Sounds); Andreas Stone Johansson	Command Freaks (Iconic Sounds); Andreas Stone Johansson	3:33
10.	"Beautiful" (美; with Baekhyun)	Lee Chae-yoon	Teddy Riley; Dominique "DOM" Rodriguez (Audity); Richard Garcia (Audity); Dantae Johnson; LaByron "Miko" Walton	Teddy Riley; Dominique "DOM" Rodriguez (Audity); Richard Garcia (Audity); Dantae Johnson; LaByron "Miko" Walton	4:03
Total length:					37:21

Love Me Right - Repackaged album (Korean version)
No.	Title	Lyrics	Music	Arrangement	Length
1.	"Love Me Right"	Oh Yoo-won; Kim Dong-hyun	iDR; Nermin Harambašić; Courtney Jenaé Stahl; Peter Tambakis; Ryan S. Jhun; Jarah Lafayette Gibson	iDR; Nermin Harambašić; Courtney Jenaé Stahl; Peter Tambakis; Ryan S. Jhun; Jarah Lafayette Gibson	3:25
2.	"Tender Love"	Gaeko	Gaeko; Im Kwang-wook (Devine Channel); Ryan Kim (Devine Channel); Mistazo (Artronic Waves); Dauri (Artronic Waves); Im "Chase" Chae-seop (Devine Channel)	Devine Channel; Artronic Waves	3:36
3.	"Call Me Baby"	Jo Yoon-kyung; Jeon Ji-eun (January 8 (lalala Studio)); Hwang Seon-jeong (January 8 (lalala Studio)); Kim Jeong-mi (January 8 (lalala Studio)); Kim Dong-hyun	Teddy Riley (Red Rocket); Dominique "DOM" Rodriguez (Red Rocket); Lee Hyun-seung (Red Rocket); Jason J. Lopez; Dantae Johnson	Red Rocket; Jason J. Lopez; Dantae Johnson	3:31
4.	"Transformer"	Kenzie	Kenzie; Jonathan Yip; Jeremy Reeves; Ray Romulus; Ray McCullough	Kenzie; The Stereotypes	3:47
5.	"What If..." (시선 둘, 시선 하나; Siseon dul, siseon hana; 'Two gazes, one gaze')	Seo Ji-eum; The Underdogs	The Underdogs; Dewain Whitmore; Adonis Shropshire	The Underdogs; Dewain Whitmore; Adonis Shropshire	4:19
6.	"My Answer" (sung by Baekhyun, D.O., Suho)	Lee Joo-hyoung (MonoTree)	Lee Joo-hyoung (MonoTree)	Lee Joo-hyoung (MonoTree)	3:33
7.	"Exodus"	Jo Yoon-kyung	Albi Albertsson (Mussashi); Yuka Otsuki (Mussashi); Fabian Strangl	Mussashi	3:20
8.	"El Dorado"	Seo Ji-eum; Lee Yoo-jin; Im Kwang-wook (Devine Channel)	Seo Ji-eum; Lee Yoo-jin; Im Kwang-wook (Devine Channel); Andreas "Mage" Maggiani (Devine Channel); Im "Chase" Chae-seop (Devine Channel)	Devine Channel	3:59
9.	"Playboy"	Jonghyun	Jonghyun (Wefreaky)	Jonghyun; Tesung Kim (Iconic Sounds); Command Freaks (Iconic Sounds)	3:32
10.	"First Love"	Lee Seu-ran	Cedric "DaBenchWarma" Smith (3Sixty); Keynon "KC" Moore (3Sixty); Perry van de Vrede (Henry Hill); Robert Nickson (Henry Hill); Ahmad Russell; Catherine Ahn; Danny Jones (3Sixty); Zev Perilman	3Sixty	4:02
11.	"Hurt"	Seo Seung-hee (Soulsweet)	Albi Albertsson (Mussashi)	Mussashi	3:39
12.	"Lady Luck" (유성우; Yuseongu; 'Meteor shower')	Jo Yoon-kyung	Command Freaks (Iconic Sounds); Andreas Stone Johansson	Command Freaks (Iconic Sounds); Andreas Stone Johansson	3:33
13.	"Beautiful"	Lee Chae-yoon	Teddy Riley; Dominique "DOM" Rodriguez (Audity); Richard Garcia (Audity); Dantae Johnson; LaByron "Miko" Walton	Teddy Riley; Dominique "DOM" Rodriguez (Audity); Richard Garcia (Audity); Dantae Johnson; LaByron "Miko" Walton	4:03
14.	"EXO 2014" (약속; Yaksok; 'Promise')	Chen; Chanyeol; Lay	Chen; Chanyeol; Lay; Deez	Lay; Deez	4:46
Total length:					53:10

Love Me Right - Repackaged album (Chinese version)
No.	Title	Lyrics	Music	Arrangement	Length
1.	"Love Me Right"	Oh Yoo-won; Kim Dong-hyun; Lin Xinye	iDR; Nermin Harambašić; Courtney Jenaé Stahl; Peter Tambakis; Ryan S. Jhun; Jarah Lafayette Gibson	iDR; Nermin Harambašić; Courtney Jenaé Stahl; Peter Tambakis; Ryan S. Jhun; Jarah Lafayette Gibson	3:25
2.	"Tender Love" (就是愛)	Gaeko; Wang Yajun	Gaeko; Im Kwang-wook (Devine Channel); Ryan Kim (Devine Channel); Mistazo (Artronic Waves); Dauri (Artronic Waves); Im "Chase" Chae-seop (Devine Channel)	Devine Channel; Artronic Waves	3:36
3.	"Call Me Baby" (叫我)	Dae Ak Dong	Teddy Riley (Red Rocket); Dominique "DOM" Rodriguez (Red Rocket); Lee Hyun-seung (Red Rocket); Jason J. Lopez; Dantae Johnson	Red Rocket; Jason J. Lopez; Dantae Johnson	3:31
4.	"Transformer" (变形女)	T-Crash	Kenzie; Jonathan Yip; Jeremy Reeves; Ray Romulus; Ray McCullough	Kenzie; The Stereotypes	3:47
5.	"What If..." (两个视线, 一个视线)	黄贞颖 Annakid; Seo Ji-eum	The Underdogs; Dewain Whitmore; Adonis Shropshire	The Underdogs; Dewain Whitmore; Adonis Shropshire	4:18
6.	"My Answer" (我的答案; sung by Chen, Lay, D.O.)	Dae Ak Dong	Lee Joo-hyoung (MonoTree)	Lee Joo-hyoung (MonoTree)	3:33
7.	"Exodus" (逃脱)	Jo Yoon-kyung; Zhou Weijie	Albi Albertsson (Mussashi); Yuka Otsuki (Mussashi); Fabian Strangl	Mussashi	3:19
8.	"El Dorado" (黄金国)	Wang Yajun	Seo Ji-eum; Lee Yoo-jin; Im Kwang-wook (Devine Channel); Andreas "Mage" Maggiani (Devine Channel); Im "Chase" Chae-seop (Devine Channel)	Devine Channel	3:59
9.	"Playboy" (坏男孩)	Wang Yajun	Jonghyun (Wefreaky)	Jonghyun; Tesung Kim (Iconic Sounds); Command Freaks (Iconic Sounds)	3:32
10.	"First Love" (初戀)	Lee Seu-ran; Joo Woo Sung	Cedric "DaBenchWarma" Smith (3Sixty); Keynon "KC" Moore (3Sixty); Perry van de Vrede (Henry Hill); Robert Nickson (Henry Hill); Ahmad Russell; Catherine Ahn; Danny Jones (3Sixty); Zev Perilman	3Sixty	4:02
11.	"Hurt" (伤害)	Seo Seung-hee (Soulsweet); Zhou Weijie	Albi Albertsson (Mussashi)	Mussashi	3:39
12.	"Lady Luck" (流星雨)	黄贞颖 Annakid	Command Freaks (Iconic Sounds); Andreas Stone Johansson	Command Freaks (Iconic Sounds); Andreas Stone Johansson	3:33
13.	"Beautiful" (美; with Baekhyun)	Lee Chae-yoon	Teddy Riley; Dominique "DOM" Rodriguez (Audity); Richard Garcia (Audity); Dantae Johnson; LaByron "Miko" Walton	Teddy Riley; Dominique "DOM" Rodriguez (Audity); Richard Garcia (Audity); Dantae Johnson; LaByron "Miko" Walton	4:03
14.	"EXO 2014" (約定)	Chen; Chanyeol; Lay	Chen; Chanyeol; Lay; Deez	Lay; Deez	4:46
Total length:					53:10

Notes

- "Call Me Baby", "Love Me Right", "Tender Love", and "Promise (EXO 2014)" are sung by all members, with the rest being sung by EXO-K and EXO-M members in their respective Korean and Chinese versions except where individual members are indicated.
- Tao does not participate in "Love Me Right", "Tender Love", and "Promise (EXO 2014)" due to his termination. His voice is heard in "First Love", even though he does not appear in the artwork of the repackage album.
- EXO Member's Lay composed the music and wrote the lyrics, together with Chen and Chanyeol for Promise.

== Charts ==
Korean and Chinese versions
Chart	Peak chart positions				Sales
Chart	Exodus (Korean)	Exodus (Chinese)	Love Me Right (Korean)	Love Me Right (Chinese)	Sales
South Korean Weekly Albums (Gaon)	1	2	1	2	KOR: 1,268,940 (Note: Sales for both Exodus and Love Me Right are combined.); JPN: 83,640 (Note: Sales for Exodus only.)
South Korean Monthly Albums (Gaon)	1	2	1	2	KOR: 1,268,940; JPN: 83,640
South Korean Yearly Albums (Gaon)	1	4	3	11	KOR: 1,268,940; JPN: 83,640
Japanese Weekly Albums (Oricon)	4	7	9	14	KOR: 1,268,940; JPN: 83,640
Japanese Monthly Albums (Oricon)	23	46	—	—	KOR: 1,268,940; JPN: 83,640

Combined versions
Chart (2015)	Peak chart positions		Sales
Chart (2015)	Exodus	Love Me Right	Sales
US Billboard 200	95	—	US: 15,000
US Independent Albums (Billboard)	15	—	US: 15,000
US Top Album Sales (Billboard)	70	—	US: 15,000
US World Albums (Billboard)	1	2	US: 15,000

== Release history ==
Release history for Exodus
Region	Date	Edition	Format	Label	Ref.
South Korea	March 30, 2015	Exodus	CD; digital download; streaming	SM; KT	
Various	March 30, 2015	Exodus	Digital download; streaming	SM	
Taiwan	May 8, 2015	Exodus	CD	Avex Taiwan	
South Korea	June 3, 2015	Love Me Right	CD; digital download; streaming	SM; KT	
Various	June 3, 2015	Love Me Right	Digital download; streaming	SM	
Taiwan	July 15, 2015	Love Me Right	CD	Avex Taiwan	

== See also ==
- List of best-selling albums in South Korea
- List of K-pop on the Billboard charts
- List of number-one albums of 2015 (South Korea)
