= Unfair (song) =

2015 Exo single

Single by Exo

from the EP Sing for You
- Language: Korean; Mandarin
- Released: December 10, 2015
- Recorded: 2015
- Studio: SM Blue Ocean (Seoul); Doobdoob (Seoul); In Grid (Seoul)
- Genre: Pop
- Length: 3:02
- Label: SM; KT Music
- Songwriters: Deanfluenza; DeerJenny; Beat&Keys
- Producers: Beat&Keys

Exo singles chronology
"Sing for You" (2015)	"Unfair" (2015)	"Lucky One" (2016)

"Unfair" is a song by South Korean–Chinese boy band Exo, released on December 10, 2015, as a single from their fourth extended play Sing for You. It was released in both Korean and Chinese versions by their label SM Entertainment.

== Background and release ==
Produced by Beat&Keys, "Unfair" described as a "pop" song with a trendy and bright melody with lyrics about a guy speaking his feelings to the girl he loves and describing her as "unfair".

== Promotion ==
Exo began performing the song "Unfair" on Korean music shows from December 18.

== Reception ==
"Unfair" debuted as number ten on Gaon Digital Chart, and at number nine at Billboard's US World Digital songs. The song is the first K-pop song to be ranked in the Best of the Week curation playlist of US's Apple Music.

== Credits and personnel ==
Credits adapted from the EP's liner notes.

Studio

- SM Blue Ocean Studio – recording, mixing
- Doobdoob Studio – recording, digital editing
- In Grid Studio – recording, digital editing
- Sterling Sound – mastering

Personnel

- SM Entertainment – executive producer
- Lee Soo-man – producer
- Kim Young-min – executive supervisor
- Exo – vocals
- Deanfluenza – Korean lyrics, composition, vocal directing, background vocals
- DeerJenny – Chinese lyrics
- Beat&Keys – producer, composition, arrangement
- Kim Jin-hwan – vocal directing
- Lee Joo-hyung – vocal directing, additional Pro Tools performing
- Kim Cheol-sun – recording, mixing
- Jang Woo-young – recording, digital editing
- Kim Hyun-gon – recording
- Jeong Eun-kyung – recording, digital editing
- Tom Coyne – mastering

== Charts ==
=== Weekly charts ===
Chart (2015)	Peak position
South Korea (Gaon)	10
US World Digital Songs (Billboard)	9

=== Monthly charts ===
Chart (2015)	Peak position
South Korea (Gaon)	22

== Sales ==
Region	Sales
South Korea (Gaon)	515,703

== Release history ==
Release history for "Unfair"
Region	Date	Format	Label
Various	December 10, 2015	Digital download; streaming	SM; KT Music
