= List of songs recorded by Exo =

Here is a total list of songs by the Korean boy group EXO. As of August 2023, they have recorded 132 songs (re-recorded versions not included).

Key
†	Indicates Single Release

== 0-9 ==
Songs	Writer	Album	Year	Ref
"3.6.5. (세 여섯 다섯)"	Hayden Bell; Didrik Thott; Christian Fast; Henrik oh Nordenback	XOXO	2013	
"24/7"	Kenzie; Harvey Mason; Jr; The Wavys; The Wildcardz; Aaron Berton; Andrew Hey	Don't Mess Up My Tempo	2018	

== A ==
Song	Writer	Album	Year	Ref
"Angel (너의 세상으로)"	J. Lewis; Jarah Gibson; DK; Hyuk Shin; Sasha Hamilton	MAMA	2012	
"Artificial Love"	JQ; Seolim; Ji Ye-won	Ex'Act	2016	
"Another Day"	Balazs Harko; ChaMane; K. Nita; Maria Hazell; Matthew Grant; Mola; Robin Ellingsen	Exist	2023	

== B ==
Song	Writer	Album	Year	Ref
"Baby Don't Cry (인어의 눈물)"	Andrew Choi; Im Kwang-wook; Kalle Engstrom; Kim Tae-sung; Ophelia	XOXO	2013	
"Black Pearl (검은 진주)"	2xxx! Brittani White; Deanfluenza; DK; Hyuk Shin; Jasmine Kearse; JJ Evans	XOXO	2013	
"Baby (아가)"	Kenzie; Kim Jung-bae	XOXO	2013	
"Beautiful"	Teddy Riley; DOM; Richard Garcia; Dantae Johnson; Labyron Walton; Lee Chae-yoon	Exodus	2015	
"Been Through (지나갈 테니)"	Park Ji-hee; JQ; Mike Woods; Kevin White; Brandyn Burnette; Molly Moore; MZMC; Heavy; Rice n' Peas; Bazzi	Universe	2017	
"Boomerang (부메랑)"	Jo Yoon-kyung	The War: The Power of Music	2017	
"Bad Dream (후폭풍)"	Seo Ji-eum; Mike Daley; Mitchell Owens; Bianca “Blush” Atterberry; Deez	Don't Mess Up My Tempo	2018	
"Bird" †	Natsumi Kobayashi	Non-album release	2019	
"Baby You Are"	JQ; Park Ji-hee; Wendy Wang; Mozella; Benjamin Ingrosso; Allakoi Peete	Obsession	2019	
"Butterfly Effect (나비효과)"	Lee Seu-ran; LDN Noise; Adrian McKinnon	Obsession	2019	
"Back It Up"	Don Mills; Kang Eun-jeong; Ned Houston; Chelsea Warner; Anne Judith Wik; Ronny Svendsen; Adrian Thesen; Pozza Punk	Reverxe	2026	
"Back Pocket"	Kang Eun-yu; Deepflow; Hugo Andersson; Jonathan Bellini; SB90	Reverxe	2026	

== C ==
Song	Writer	Album	Year	Ref
"Christmas Day"	Misfit	Miracles in December	2013	
"Call Me Baby"	Nigel; Kim Dong-hyun	Exodus	2015	
"Can't Bring Me Down"	Young-hu Kim	Lotto	2016	
"Cloud 9"	Misfit	Ex'Act	2016	
"Coming Over" †	Amon Hayashi	Countdown	2016	
"Cosmic Railway"	Sara Sakurai	Countdown	2018	
"Chill (소름)"	Chanyeol; Seo Ji-eum	The War	2017	
"Cinderella"	Brandon Arreaga; Charles Roberts Nelsen; Inverness; Jackson Morgan; Kyle Buckley; Moon Seol-li; MZMC; Pink Slip	Exist	2023	
"Cream Soda" †	Adrian Mckinnon; Bobby Candler; Ebenezer Fabiyi; Kwame "KZ" Kwei-Armah Jr. Moon Seol-li; Tre Jean-Marie	Exist	2023	
"Crown" †	Kang Eun-jeong; Yoon (153/Joombas); Adrian McKinnon; Ninos Hanna; Fabian Zeke; Kyle Buckley; Pink Slip	Reverxe	2026	
"Crazy"	Yoon (153/Joombas); Leowi; Magnus Lie Skistad; Merili Käsper	Reverxe	2026	

== D ==
Song	Writer	Album	Year	Ref
"Don't Go (나비소녀)"	Luhan; Hyuk Shin; John Major; Jordan Kyle; Jeffrey Patrick Lewis	XOXO	2013	
"December, 2014 (The Winter's Tale)" †	January 8th (Jam Factory)	Exology Chapter 1: The Lost Planet	2014	
"Drop That"	MQ; Jae Shim (BeatBurger); Tanaka Hidenori (agehasprings)	Countdown	2015	
"Dancing King" (with Yoo Jae-suk) †	JQ; Jang Yeo-jin	SM Station Season 1	2016	
"Diamond (다이아몬드)"	Jo Yoon-kyung	The War	2017	
"Damage"	Shin Jin-hye; LDN Noise; Deez; Adrian Mckinnon	Don't Mess Up My Tempo	2018	
"Day After Day (오늘도)"	Jo Yoon-kyung; Mike Daley; Mitchell Owens; Deez; Jeff Lewis	Obsession	2019	
"Don't fight the feeling" †	Kenzie; Mike Jiminez; Damon Thomas; Tesung Kim (Iconic Sound); Tha Aristocrats; Tiyon "TC" Mack; Moon Kim	Don't Fight the Feeling	2021	

== E ==
Song	Writer	Album	Year	Ref
"El Dorado"	Lim Kwang-wook; Mage; Chase; Seo Ji-eum; Lee Yoo-jin	Exodus	2015	
"Exodus"	Albi Albertsson; Yuka Otsuki; Fabian Strangl; Jo Yoon-kyung	Exodus	2015	
"Exo Keep On Dancing"	Shim Jae-won	EXO PLANET #3 –THE EXO'rDIUM[dot]	2017	
"Electric Kiss" †	Junji Ishiwatari	Countdown	2018	

== F ==
Song	Writer	Album	Year	Ref
"First Love"	Cedric "Dabenchwarma" Smith; Keynon Moore; Henry Hill; Ahmad Russell; Catherine Ahn; Danny Jones; Zev Perilman	Love Me Right	2015	
"Falling For You"	Seo Ji-eum	For Life	2016	
"For Life" †	Kenzie	For Life	2016	
"Forever"	Kenzie	The War	2017	
"Full Moon"	MQ	EXO PLANET #3 –THE EXO'rDIUM[dot]	2017	
"Fall"	JQ; Mola; MQ	Universe	2017	
"Flatline"	Jang Yun-ji (Jam Factory); Amanda Cygnaeus; Noak Hellsing; Rasmus Budny	Reverxe	2026	

== G ==
Song	Writer	Album	Year	Ref
"Growl (으르렁)" †	Hyuk Shin; DK; Jordan Kyle; John Major; Jarah Gibson	Growl	2013	
"Girl X Friend"	Je Yi-kyu; Seo-lim; Ji Ye-won	Sing for You	2015	
"Going Crazy (내가 미쳐)"	JQ; Seolim	The War	2017	
"Good Night"	Hyun Ji-won; JQ	Universe	2017	
"Gravity"	Chanyeol; Kim Min-jung; LDN Noise; Deez; Adrian Mckinnon	Don't Mess Up My Tempo	2018	
"Groove (춤)"	JQ; Mola; Hyuk Shin; Blair Taylor; Jisoo Park	Obsession	2019	

== H ==
Song	Writer	Album	Year	Ref
"History" †	Remee Mikkel Sigvardt Jackman; Thomas Troelsen; Yoo Young-jin	Mama	2012	
"Heart Attack (심장 마비)"	GoodWill & MGI; Reynard Silva	XOXO	2013	
"Hurt"	Albi Albertsson; 100% Seo-jung	Exodus	2015	
"Heaven"	Chanyeol Min Yeon-jae	Ex'Act	2016	
"Hear Me Out" †	Adrian Mcknnon; George Carroll; Grades; Jermy "Tay" Jasper; Jack Ro; Kim Dong-hyun; Michael Orabiyi; Park Ji-hyun (Artiffect); Sade Munirah; Scribz Riley; Tavaughn Young; Tave; Yakob	Exist	2023	

== I ==
Song	Writer	Album	Year	Ref
"Into My World"	Sara Sakurai	Countdown	2018	
"I'm Home"	Lee Hyung-seok; Bang Hye-hyun; Georgia Murray; Alexandra Soumalias; Daniel Michael Victor; Rasmus Gregersen; DMV & Ras	Reverxe	2026	

== J ==
Song	Writer	Album	Year	Ref
"Jekyll (지킬)"	JQ; Kim Hye-jin; Tay Jasper; Kaelin Ellis; Nicky van der Lugt Melsert	Obsession	2019	
"Just as Usual (지켜줄게)"	Thama (Devine Channel); San (Vendors); Fascinador (Vendors); Zenur (Vendors); Shaquille Rayes	Don't Fight the Feeling	2021	

== K ==
Song	Writer	Album	Year	Ref
"Ko Ko Bop" †	Chen; Chanyeol; Baekhyun; JQ; Hyun Ji-won	The War	2017	

== L ==
Song	Writer	Album	Year	Ref
"Let Out The Beast (짐승을 보자)"	Charles Wiggins; Chris Lightbody; Jay J. Kim; Robert Peters; Robert Steinmille; Spencer Yaras; Taeko Carroll	XOXO	2013	
"Lucky (운이 좋은)"	Kim Eana	Growl	2013	
"Love, Love, Love"	Seo Ji-eum; Annakid (黄貞穎 Annakid)	Overdose	2014	
"Lady Luck (유성우)"	Command Freaks; Andreas Stone Johansson; Jo Yoon-kyung	Exodus	2015	
"Love Me Right ~romantic universe~" †	YooWon Oh(Jam Factory); DongHyun Kim; Sara Sakurai	Countdown	2015	
"Lightsaber" †	Chanyeol; MQ; Jung Ju-hee	Sing For You Countdown	2015	
"Love Me Right" †	Denzil "DR" Remedios; Nermin Harambasic; Courtney Woolsey; Peter Tambakis; Ryan S. Jhun; Jarah Lafayette Gibson	Love Me Right	2015	
"Lotto" †	JQ; Seolim; Jo Yoon-kyung Kim Min-ji (Jam Factory)	Lotto	2016	
"Lucky One" †	JQ; Seolim; Choi Jin-seon; Jang Yeo-jin	Ex'Act	2016	
"Lights Out"	Chen	Universe	2017	
"Lovin' You Mo'"	Amon Hayashi (Digz Inc.)	Countdown	2018	
"Love Shot" †	Jo Yoon-kyung; Chen; Chanyeol; Mike Woods; Kevin White; Andrew Bazzi; Anthony Russo; MZMC	Love Shot	2018	
"Let Me In" †	Enzo; Hassan Ashi Jr; Hautboi Rich; Jayden Henry; Je'Juan Antonio; Jordain Johnson; Kaelin Ellis; Kelsey Merges; Noah Barer	Exist	2023	
"Love Fool"	Cha Yu-bin (Verygoods); Christian Fast; Jimmy Claeson; John Mars	Exist	2023	

== M ==
Song	Writer	Album	Year	Ref
"Machine"	Albi Albertsson; Timo Kaukolampi	Mama	2012	
"Mama" †	Yoo Young-jin	Mama	2012	
"Miracles in December (12월의 기적)" †	Sarah Yoon; Liu Yuan	Miracles in December	2013	
"My Turn To Cry"	Kim Young-hu	Miracles in December	2013	
"My Lady (내 여자)"	Hitchhiker (DJ Jinu); Ophelia	XOXO	2013	
"Moonlight (월광)"	Seo Ji-eum; Lin Xin Ye	Overdose	2014	
"My Answer"	Lee Joo-hyung	Exodus	2015	
"Monster" †	Kenzie; Deepflow	Ex'Act	2016	
"Moonlight Shadow"	Kim Wen-di (Jam Factory); Wyatt Sanders; Kaitlyn Dorff; Ian Jeffrey Thomas; Mike Robbins; Krass	Reverxe	2026	

== N ==
Song	Writer	Album	Year	Ref
"Non Stop"	Jo Yoon-kyung; Obi Klein; Charli Taft; Andreas Oberg	Obsession	2019	
"No Matter (훅!)"	Mok Ji-min (lalala Studio); Skylar Mones; Andreas Öberg; Patrick Hartman	Don't Fight the Feeling	2021	
"No Makeup"	Adrian Mckinnon; Greg Bonnick; Hayden Chapman; LDN Noise; Moon Seol-li; Sevn Dayz	Exist	2023	

== O ==
Song	Writer	Album	Year	Ref
"Overdose (중독)" †	Kenzie; Annakid (黄貞穎 Annakid); The Underdogs	Overdose	2014	
"On The Snow (발자국)"	Ryu Da-som	Sing For You	2015	
"One And Only (유리어항)"	Park Seong-hee	Ex'Act	2016	
"Ooh La La La (닿은 순간)"	Hwang Yoo-bin; Jamil 'Digi' Chammas; Andrew Bazzi; Justin Lucas; Anthony Pavels; MZMC	Don't Mess Up My Tempo	2018	
"Oasis (오아시스)"	Jo Yoon-kyung; Kevin White; Mike Woods; Andrew Bazzi; MZMC	Don't Mess Up My Tempo	2018	
"Obsession" †	Kenzie; Dwayne Abernathy Jr; Cristi “Stalone” Gallo; Asia'h Epperson; Adrian Mckinnon; Yoo Young-jin; Ryan S. Jhun	Obsession	2019	

== P ==
Song	Writer	Album	Year	Ref
"Peter Pan (피터팬)"	Denzil Remedios; Kibwe Luke; Ryan S. Jhun	XOXO	2013	
"Playboy"	Jonghyun	Exodus	2015	
"Promise (EXO 2014) (약속)"	Chen; Chanyeol; Lay	Love Me Right	2015	
"Power" †	JQ; Kim Hye-jung (makeumine works)	The War: The Power of Music	2017	
"Paradise (파라다이스)"	Brandon Arreaga; Edwin Honoret; Jake Torrey; Michael Matosic	Don't Fight the Feeling	2021	
"Private Party"	Brandon Arreaga; Kaelyn Behr; Landon Sears; Moon Seol-li; MZMC; Rudy Sandapa	Exist	2023	

== R ==
Song	Writer	Album	Year	Ref
"Run (런)"	Seo Ji-eum; Zhou Mi	Overdose	2014	
"Run This"	Amon Hayashi (Digz Inc.)	Countdown	2016	
"Runaway"	Seo Ji-eum; Kevin White (Rice n' Peas); Mike Woods (Rice n' Peas); Andrew Bazzi (Rice n' Peas)	Don't Fight the Feeling	2021	
"Regret It"	Adrian Mckinnon; Dwayne "Dem Jointz" Abernathy Jr. Jang Sang-min (Lalala Studio); Jeremy "Tay"Jasper; Lucky Daye; Prince Charles	Exist	2023	

== S ==
Song	Writer	Album	Year	Ref
"Sing for You" †	Kenzie	Sing For You	2015	
"She's Dreaming (꿈)"	Chen	Lotto	2016	
"Stronger"	Jung Joo-hee Agnes Shin	Ex'Act	2016	
"Sweet Lies"	Chanyeol; G.Soul	The War: The Power of Music	2017	
"Stay"	JQ; Lee Ji-hye; Sik-K	Universe	2017	
"Smile On My Face (여기 있을게)"	JQ; Park Ji-hee; Brian Kennedy; Iain James; Samuel Jensen	Don't Mess Up My Tempo	2018	
"Sign"	JQ; Mola; Harvey Mason; Jr; Kevin Randolph; Patrick J. Que Smith; Dewain Whitmore; Britt Burton; Andrew Hey	Don't Mess Up My Tempo	2018	
"Suffocate"	Mola (PNP); Cyrus Villanueva; Charlotte Wilson; Tim Tan	Reverxe	2026	

== T ==
Song	Writer	Album	Year	Ref
"Two Moons (두 개의 달이 뜨는 밤)" (featuring Key of SHINee)	Albi Albertsson; Yim Kwang-wook	Mama	2012	
"The First Snow (첫 눈)"	Kenzie	Miracles in December	2013	
"The Star"	Soulfulmonster	Miracles in December	2013	
"Thunder (천둥)"	Jeon Gandhi; Lin Xin Ye	Overdose	2014	
"Tender Love"	Gaeko; Lim Kwang-wook; Ryan Kim; Mistazo; Dauri; Chase	Love Me Right	2015	
"Transformer"	Kenzie; Jonathan Yip; Jeremy Reeves; Ray Romulus; Ray McCullough	Exodus	2015	
"Tactix"	Daniel Kim Hanif Hitmanic Sabzevari; Kamikaoru	Countdown	2016	
"They Never Know"	Jo Yoon-kyung	Ex'Act	2016	
"Twenty Four"	Lee Yoo-jin	For Life	2016	
"The Eve (전야)"	Hwang Yoo-bin	The War	2017	
"Touch It (너의 손짓)"	Chen; Jo Yoon-kyung	The War	2017	
"Together"	MQ; Chanyeol	EXO PLANET #3 –THE EXO'rDIUM[dot]	2017	
"Tempo" †	JQ; PENOMECO; Yoo Young-jin; Jamil "Digi" Chammas; Leven Kali; Tay Jasper; Adrian Mckinnon; MZMC	Don't Mess Up My Tempo	2018	
"Trauma (트라우마)"	Chanyeol; Keynon Moore; Cedric "Dabenchwarma" Smith; Ryan S. Jhun; Danny Jones	Love Shot	2018	
"Trouble"	Hwang Yoo-bin; Jin Suk Choi; Karen Poole; Bobii Lewis	Obsession	2019	
"Touch & Go"	Jiggy (153/Joombas); Wyatt Sanders; Olivia Webb; Barry Cohen; Gingerbread	Reverxe	2026	

== U ==
Song	Writer	Album	Year	Ref
"Unfair (불공평해)" †	Deanfluenza	Sing For You	2015	
"Universe" †	Yoon Sa-ra	Universe	2017	

== W ==
Song	Writer	Album	Year	Ref
"What Is Love" †	DOM; Richard Garcia; Teddy Riley; Yoo Young-jin	Mama	2012	
"Wolf (늑대와 미녀)" †	Jo Yoon-kyung; Nermin Harambašić	XOXO	2013	
"What if... (시선 둘, 시선 하나)"	The Underdogs; Patrick 'J. Que' Smith; Dewain Whitmore; Adonis Shropshire; Seo Ji-eum	Exodus	2015	
"What I Want for Christmas"	JQ; Seolim	For Life	2016	
"Winter Heat"	Kim Min-ji	For Life	2016	
"White Noise (백색소음)"	Seo Ji-eum	Ex'Act	2016	
"Walk On Memories (기억을 걷는 밤)"	Lee Seu-ran	The War	2017	
"What U Do?"	Kenzie	The War	2017	
"With You (가끔)"	Chanyeol; Kim Min-ji; Sons Of Sonix	Don't Mess Up My Tempo	2018	
"Wait"	Seo Ji-eum; Andreas Öberg; Jimmy Burney	Love Shot	2018	

== X ==
Song	Writer	Album	Year	Ref
"XOXO"	Steven Lee; Goldfingerz; Jimmy Richard; E.One	Growl	2013	

== Y ==
Song	Writer	Album	Year	Ref
"Ya Ya Ya"	Kenzie; Dwayne Abernathy Jr. Ryan Jhun; David Brown; Charles Hinshaw; Allen Gordon Jr; Coko; Taj; Andrea Martin; Ivan Matias	Obsession	2019	
