= The War (album) =

- Korean version digital cover

Studio album by Exo
- Released: July 18, 2017
- Recorded: 2017
- Studio: Doobdoob (Seoul); Iconic (Seoul); In Grid (Seoul); MonoTree (Seoul); SM Big Shot (Seoul); SM Blue Ocean (Seoul); SM LVYIN (Seoul); Sound Pool (Seoul)
- Genre: K-pop; hip hop; R&B; EDM
- Length: 31:35; 41:53 (The Power of Music repackage)
- Language: Korean; Mandarin; English
- Label: SM; Genie
- Producer: Lee Soo-man; Britt Burton; Dewain Whitmore Jr.; Droyd; Wassily Gradovsky; iDR; Ryan S. Jhun; J. Que; LDN Noise; Harvey Mason Jr.; Obi; Rice N' Peas; R!OT; Styalz Fuego; Ronnie Svendsen; The Fliptones; The Jackie Boyz

Exo chronology
For Life (2016)	The War (2017)	EXO PLANET #3-The EXO'rDIUM[dot] (2017)

Singles from The War
- 1. "Ko Ko Bop" Released: July 18, 2017

Repackage album cover
- Korean version digital cover

Singles from The Power of Music
- 1. "Power" Released: September 5, 2017

The War (stylized in all caps) is the fourth studio album by South Korean boy band Exo. It was released on July 18, 2017, by SM Entertainment under Genie Music's distribution. The album includes a total of nine tracks including the lead single "Ko Ko Bop". The War received the highest number of pre-orders at the time for a K-pop album, with more than 800,000 physical copies. 24 days after being released, it became Exo's first album to have sold over 1 million copies with a single release. The War became Exo's fifth consecutive album win Album of the Year and the MAMA Awards.

The album was re-released under the title The War: The Power of Music on September 5, 2017. This was the first Exo release not to feature member Lay, who began an indefinite hiatus shortly before the music video for "Ko Ko Bop" was filmed, and the last album to be separately released in both Korean and Chinese language.

== Background and release ==
On June 15, 2017, it was confirmed by SM Entertainment that Exo would release a new album sometime in mid-July. On June 23, SM Entertainment announced that member Lay would be unable to participate in the production and promotion of the album.

On July 8, Exo's official Twitter account was made public, through which SM Entertainment revealed the first teaser video for the album. Also on July 8, Exo's official Instagram account opened by posting the three versions of Exo's new album logo. On July 10, the album's title was announced to be The War. From July 9 to 16, the album's track list was revealed one by one through a series of teaser videos each featuring one member. The album and its lead single's music video were released on July 18.

SM started releasing teasers of the repackaged edition of the album with the message "The Power of Music". The first teaser, titled "#Total_Eclipse", which was the first seen during the teaser trailers of the group's debut, and their first song "What Is Love", was released on August 21, 2017, at the same time as when the Solar eclipse of August 21, 2017 happened. The second teaser was released on 28 August, titled "#Parallel_Universe".

The third teaser titled "Power #RF_05" was released on August 30. On the same day, the title of the re-packaged album was revealed to be The War: The Power of Music and that it would be released on September 5, 2017, with 12 tracks including the lead single "Power". SM started releasing teaser images of each member from August 30. On August 31, it was revealed that the album would include new three songs "Power", "Sweet Lies", and "Boomerang", along with the original nine songs of The War. On September 4, a poster of the repackaged album and "Power" music video teaser were released. The repackaged album and its three new tracks were released on September 5.

== Promotion ==
On July 18, Exo held a press conference in the morning where they expressed their gratefulness for achieving more than 800,000 pre-orders. Chanyeol commented, "I think it's an honor to be making new records throughout our lives. I want to say thank you." The group also held a live broadcast titled "Ko Ko Bop on One Night Summer" where they talked about the album and the music video shooting.

Exo started performing "Ko Ko Bop" and "The Eve" on South Korean music shows on July 20 and ended their promotions on August 13. Exo also performed their new songs in Hong Kong during the SM Town Live World Tour VI on August 5 and during the Music Bank World Tour in Jakarta on September 2.

On September 6, Exo held a mini fan meeting where they performed "Power" for the first time. The group started promoting the repackaged edition The War: The Power of Music by performing "Power" on South Korean music shows on September 7. On September 15, Exo also performed "Ko Ko Bop", "The Eve" and "Power" during Lotte Duty Free Family Festival in Seoul.

== Singles ==
"Ko Ko Bop" topped the Gaon Digital Chart for four non-consecutive weeks. Exo also became the first male group to chart at number one for four weeks. The song also ranked number one on the Gaon Monthly Chart for August, making Exo the first group in 2017 and the fifth boy group since 2012 to top the chart. On September 14, Exo's song "Power" recorded the highest score of all time on M Countdown with 11,000 points, making Exo one of two artists to achieve a perfect score after the system changes were implemented in June 2015. The win also marks their 100th win on music shows.

== Commercial performance ==
=== The War ===
Prior to its release, The War received a record-breaking pre-order by retail outlets of 807,235 physical copies, making it the K-pop album with the highest number of pre-orders at that time. Within one week of its release, the album sold over 600,000 physical copies and became the best-selling album in one week on the South Korean album sales chart Hanteo, surpassing the record of 522,300 copies held by Ex'Act, Exo's previous album. The War topped the Billboard World Album Chart for two consecutive weeks, and the South Korean Gaon Album Chart for three consecutive weeks.

Apple Music selected The War as "The Best of the Week". According to Osen, Exo recorded album sales of approximately 1,012,021 copies in the span of 24 days, making The War the second fastest album in Gaon Chart history to achieve this milestone. It became the first album by Exo to have surpassed sales of 1,000,000 copies with a single album.

=== The War: The Power of Music ===
The War: The Power of Music topped the South Korean Gaon Album Chart for two consecutive weeks. Additionally, the Korean and Chinese versions of the album debuted at number one and two respectively on the YinYueTai China Weekly Albums Chart.

== Accolades ==
Awards and nominations for The War
Award	Year	Category	Result	Ref.
Mnet Asian Music Awards	2017	Qoo10 Album of the Year	Won	
Melon Music Awards	2017	Album of the Year	Nominated	
Golden Disc Awards	2018	Album Bonsang	Won	
Golden Disc Awards	2018	Album Daesang	Nominated	

Listicles
Publication	List	Rank	Ref.
Affinity Magazine	Top 10 Best K-pop Albums of 2017	3	
Billboard	The 20 Best K-pop Albums of 2017	11	
Interpark	Best Albums of 2017	1	
SBS PopAsia	2017 Best Albums	4	

== Track listing ==
The War – Korean version
No.	Title	Lyrics	Music	Arrangement	Length
1.	"The Eve (前夜)" (전야; Jeon-ya)	Hwang Yoo-bin	Mike Woods (Rice N' Peas); Kevin White (Rice N' Peas); Andrew Bazzi (Rice N' Peas); MZMC; Henry Lau	Rice N' Peas	2:56
2.	"Ko Ko Bop"	Chen; Chanyeol; Baekhyun; JQ (Makeumine Works); Hyun Ji-won (Makeumine Works)	Styalz Fuego; Jeremy "Tay" Jasper; Shaylen Carroll; MZMC	Styalz Fuego	3:10
3.	"What U Do?"	Kenzie	Kenzie; Ronny Vidar Svendsen; Justin Stein	Ronny Vidar Svendsen	3:51
4.	"Forever"	Kenzie	Kenzie; LDN Noise; Adrian McKinnon	LDN Noise	3:51
5.	"Diamond" (다이아몬드; Daiamondeu)	Jo Yoon-kyung	Harvey Mason Jr.; Michael "R!ot" Wyckoff; Britt Burton; Patrick "J. Que" Smith; Dewain Whitmore	Harvey Mason Jr.; Michael "R!ot" Wyckoff; Britt Burton; Patrick "J. Que" Smith; Dewain Whitmore	3:31
6.	"Touch It" (너의 손짓; Neoui Sonjit; lit. Your Signs)	Chen; Jo Yoon-kyung	Carlos Battey; Steven Battey; David Delazyn; Chaz Mishan; iDR; Ryan S. Jhun	The Jackie Boyz; The Fliptones; iDR; Ryan S. Jhun	3:30
7.	"Chill" (소름; Soreum; lit. Creeps)	Chanyeol; Seo Ji-eum	Droyd; Julien Maurice Moore; G.Soul; Jeremy "Tay" Jasper; Otha "Vakseen" Davis III; MZMC	Droyd	3:08
8.	"Walk on Memories" (기억을 걷는 밤; Gieokeul Geotneun Bam; lit. A Night of Walking Memories)	Lee Seu-ran	Justin Reinstein (Mussashi); Wassily Gradovsky	Wassily Gradovsky	3:52
9.	"Going Crazy" (내가 미쳐; Naega Michyeo)	JQ (Makeumine Works); Seolim (Makeumine Works)	Shim Jae-won (BeatBurger); Shaun; Wilbart "Vedo" McCoy III; MZMC; Otha "Vakseen" Davis III	Shim Jae-won (BeatBurger); Shaun	3:46
Total length:					31:35

The War – Chinese version
No.	Title	Lyrics	Music	Arrangement	Length
1.	"The Eve" (破风)	DeerJenny	Mike Woods (Rice N' Peas); Kevin White (Rice N' Peas); Andrew Bazzi (Rice N' Peas); MZMC; Henry Lau	Rice N' Peas	2:56
2.	"Ko Ko Bop" (叩叩趴)	Arys Chien	Styalz Fuego; Jeremy "Tay" Jasper; Shaylen Carroll; MZMC	Styalz Fuego	3:10
3.	"What U Do?" (可爱·可恶)	Arys Chien	Kenzie; Ronny Vidar Svendsen; Justin Stein	Ronny Vidar Svendsen	3:51
4.	"Forever" (我加你等于永远)	Lin Xinye	Kenzie; LDN Noise; Adrian McKinnon	LDN Noise	3:51
5.	"Diamond" (C乐章)	Lu Yi Qiu	Harvey Mason Jr.; Michael "R!ot" Wyckoff; Britt Burton; Patrick "J. Que" Smith; Dewain Whitmore	Harvey Mason Jr.; Michael "R!ot" Wyckoff; Britt Burton; Patrick "J. Que" Smith; Dewain Whitmore	3:31
6.	"Touch It" (指语)	Li Yi Xuan	Carlos Battey; Steven Battey; David Delazyn; Chaz Mishan; iDR; Ryan S. Jhun	The Jackie Boyz; The Fliptones; iDR; Ryan S. Jhun	3:30
7.	"Chill" (寒噤)	Yang Yo-jung	Droyd; Julien Maurice Moore; G.Soul; Jeremy "Tay" Jasper; Otha "Vakseen" Davis III; MZMC	Droyd	3:08
8.	"Walk on Memories" (梦回暮夜)	DeerJenny	Justin Reinstein (Mussashi); Wassily Gradovsky	Wassily Gradovsky	3:52
9.	"Going Crazy" (疯语者)	Lu Yi Qiu	Shim Jae-won (BeatBurger); Shaun; Wilbart "Vedo" McCoy III; MZMC; Otha "Vakseen" Davis III	Shim Jae-won (BeatBurger); Shaun	3:46
Total length:					31:35

The War: The Power of Music – Korean version
No.	Title	Lyrics	Music	Arrangement	Length
1.	"The Eve (前夜)" (전야; Jeon-ya)	Hwang Yoo-bin	Mike Woods (Rice N' Peas); Kevin White (Rice N' Peas); Andrew Bazzi (Rice N' Peas); MZMC; Henry Lau	Rice N' Peas	2:56
2.	"Power"	JQ (Makeumine Works); Hye-soo (Makeumine Works); Kim Hye-jeong (Makeumine Works)	LDN Noise; James Matthew Norton	LDN Noise	3:42
3.	"Sweet Lies"	Chanyeol; G.Soul	Joseph "Joe Millionaire" Foster; Jeremy "Tay" Jasper; G.Soul; Otha "Vakseen" Davis III; MZMC	Joseph "Joe Millionaire" Foster	3:36
4.	"Ko Ko Bop"	Chen; Chanyeol; Baekhyun; JQ (Makeumine Works); Hyun Ji-won (Makeumine Works)	Styalz Fuego; Jeremy "Tay" Jasper; Shaylen Carroll; MZMC	Styalz Fuego	3:10
5.	"What U Do?"	Kenzie	Kenzie; Ronny Vidar Svendsen; Justin Stein	Ronny Vidar Svendsen	3:51
6.	"Forever"	Kenzie	Kenzie; LDN Noise; Adrian McKinnon	LDN Noise	3:51
7.	"Boomerang" (부메랑; Bumerang)	Jo Yoon-kyung	Daniel "Obi" Klein; Thomas Sardorf; Ilanguaq Lumholt	Daniel "Obi" Klein	3:00
8.	"Diamond" (다이아몬드; Daiamondeu)	Jo Yoon-kyung	Harvey Mason Jr.; Michael "R!ot" Wyckoff; Britt Burton; Patrick "J. Que" Smith; Dewain Whitmore	Harvey Mason Jr.; Michael "R!ot" Wyckoff; Britt Burton; Patrick "J. Que" Smith; Dewain Whitmore	3:31
9.	"Touch It" (너의 손짓; Neoui Sonjit; lit. Your Signs)	Chen; Jo Yoon-kyung	Carlos Battey; Steven Battey; David Delazyn; Chaz Mishan; iDR; Ryan S. Jhun	The Jackie Boyz; The Fliptones; iDR; Ryan S. Jhun	3:30
10.	"Chill" (소름; Soreum; lit. Creeps)	Chanyeol; Seo Ji-eum	Droyd; Julien Maurice Moore; G.Soul; Jeremy "Tay" Jasper; Otha "Vakseen" Davis III; MZMC	Droyd	3:08
11.	"Walk on Memories" (기억을 걷는 밤; Gieokeul Geotneun Bam; lit. A Night of Walking Memories)	Lee Seu-ran	Justin Reinstein (Mussashi); Wassily Gradovsky	Wassily Gradovsky	3:52
12.	"Going Crazy" (내가 미쳐; Naega Michyeo)	JQ (Makeumine Works); Seolim (Makeumine Works)	Shim Jae-won (BeatBurger); Shaun; Wilbart "Vedo" McCoy III; MZMC; Otha "Vakseen" Davis III	Shim Jae-won (BeatBurger); Shaun	3:46
Total length:					41:53

The War: The Power of Music – Chinese version
No.	Title	Lyrics	Music	Arrangement	Length
1.	"The Eve" (破风)	DeerJenny	Mike Woods (Rice N' Peas); Kevin White (Rice N' Peas); Andrew Bazzi (Rice N' Peas); MZMC; Henry Lau	Rice N' Peas	2:56
2.	"Power" (超音力)	Wu Yiwei	LDN Noise; James Matthew Norton	LDN Noise	3:42
3.	"Sweet Lies" (甜蜜謊言)	Jeremy G	Joseph "Joe Millionaire" Foster; Jeremy "Tay" Jasper; G.Soul; Otha "Vakseen" Davis III; MZMC	Joseph "Joe Millionaire" Foster	3:36
4.	"Ko Ko Bop" (叩叩趴)	Arys Chien	Styalz Fuego; Jeremy "Tay" Jasper; Shaylen Carroll; MZMC	Styalz Fuego	3:10
5.	"What U Do?" (可爱·可恶)	Arys Chien	Kenzie; Ronny Vidar Svendsen; Justin Stein	Ronny Vidar Svendsen	3:51
6.	"Forever" (我加你等于永远)	Lin Xinye	Kenzie; LDN Noise; Adrian McKinnon	LDN Noise	3:51
7.	"Boomerang" (愛迴旋)	Yan Yun Nong	Daniel "Obi" Klein; Thomas Sardorf; Ilanguaq Lumholt	Daniel "Obi" Klein	3:00
8.	"Diamond" (C乐章)	Lu Yi Qiu	Harvey Mason Jr.; Michael "R!ot" Wyckoff; Britt Burton; Patrick "J. Que" Smith; Dewain Whitmore	Harvey Mason Jr.; Michael "R!ot" Wyckoff; Britt Burton; Patrick "J. Que" Smith; Dewain Whitmore	3:31
9.	"Touch It" (指语)	Li Yi Xuan	Carlos Battey; Steven Battey; David Delazyn; Chaz Mishan; iDR; Ryan S. Jhun	The Jackie Boyz; The Fliptones; iDR; Ryan S. Jhun	3:30
10.	"Chill" (寒噤)	Yang Yo-jung	Droyd; Julien Maurice Moore; G.Soul; Jeremy "Tay" Jasper; Otha "Vakseen" Davis III; MZMC	Droyd	3:08
11.	"Walk on Memories" (梦回暮夜)	DeerJenny	Justin Reinstein (Mussashi); Wassily Gradovsky	Wassily Gradovsky	3:52
12.	"Going Crazy" (疯语者)	Lu Yi Qiu	Shim Jae-won (BeatBurger); Shaun; Wilbart "Vedo" McCoy III; MZMC; Otha "Vakseen" Davis III	Shim Jae-won (BeatBurger); Shaun	3:46
Total length:					41:53

== Charts ==
=== Korean and Chinese versions ===
Weekly charts

Chart (2017)	Peak chart positions			
Chart (2017)	The War		The War: TPOM	
Chart (2017)	Korean	Chinese	Korean	Chinese
Chinese Albums (YinYueTai)	1	2	1	2
French Download Albums (SNEP)	24	—	36	—
Japanese Albums (Oricon)	7	35	—	—
Japanese Western Albums (Oricon)	1	4	—	—
South Korean Albums (Gaon)	1	2	1	2

Monthly charts

Chart (2017)	Peak chart positions			
Chart (2017)	The War		The War: TPOM	
Chart (2017)	Korean	Chinese	Korean	Chinese
Japanese Albums (Oricon)	22	—	—	—
Japanese Western Albums (Oricon)	1	10	—	—
South Korean Albums (Gaon)	1	2	2	4

Year-end charts

Chart (2017)	Position			
Chart (2017)	The War		The War: TPOM	
Chart (2017)	Korean	Chinese	Korean	Chinese
Chinese Albums (YinYueTai)	7	8	13	24
South Korean Albums (Gaon)	2	23	7	64
US World Albums (Billboard)	7		—	—

=== Combined versions ===
Chart (2017)	Peak chart positions	
Chart (2017)	The War	The War: TPOM
Belgian Albums (Ultratop Flanders)	92	—
Canadian Albums (Billboard)	76	—
French Download Albums (SNEP)	24	36
Japanese Hot Albums (Billboard)	11	12
New Zealand Heatseekers (RMNZ)	4	—
Scottish Albums (OCC)	93	—
UK Download Albums (OCC)	27	—
UK Independent Albums (OCC)	14	—
UK Independent Album Breakers (OCC)	2	—
US Billboard 200	87	—
US Independent Albums (Billboard)	3	—
US World Albums (Billboard)	1	—

== Sales ==
Country	Sales				Total
Country	The War		The War: TPOM		Total
Country	Korean version	Chinese version	Korean version	Chinese version	Total
China (Xiami)	365,332	192,460	194,870	116,579	869,241
Japan (Oricon)	43,147	7,595	—	—	50,742
South Korea (Gaon)	990,658	135,267	514,445	59,612	1,699,403
US (Nielsen)	11,000		—	—	11,000

== Release history ==
Region	Date	Edition	Format	Label
Various	July 18, 2017	The War	Digital download	SM
South Korea	July 19, 2017	The War	CD	SM
Japan	July 21, 2017	The War	CD	SM
Various	September 5, 2017	The War: The Power of Music	Digital download, CD	SM
