= LDN Noise =

British songwriting and production duo

- Genres: EDM; pop; K-pop
- Years active: 2012–present
- Label: Atlantic
- Members: Greg Bonnick; Hayden Chapman

LDN Noise (pronounced London Noise) is a British songwriting and record production duo based in London, England. Consisting of songwriter Greg Bonnick and DJ Hayden Chapman, the duo has worked with artists such as Nathan Sykes, Nick Jonas, and Chris Brown since 2012, most notably having co-written the 2012's number-one UK hit "Turn Up the Music" for the latter artist.

Bonnick and Chapman, however, are most known for their work with K-pop artists, most notably with soloists and idol groups under the management of SM Entertainment, such as f(x), Exo, Red Velvet and NCT. Describing their sonic style as "different but similar", the duo often incorporates elements from UK garage, drum and bass, funk and '90s house music to their EDM-influenced work, thus creating their own signature sonic style. In addition to their initial work with South Korean artists, the duo has released several digital singles as both a lead artist and a featured act since 2016. LDN Noise has been hailed as one of the "hidden heroes" behind the success of K-pop by The Korea Times.

== Background and career ==
Both Chapman and Bonnick studied music, but at different colleges, prior to their professional career as songwriters. After meeting through mutual friends, the duo started writing and producing together under the name Agent X with Leon Price, and eventually landed their first writing credit for "Turn Up the Music", which was released as the first single from Chris Brown's fifth studio album Fortune. The song was a commercial success, peaking at number ten on the Billboard Hot 100 chart while topping the UK Singles Chart. After being introduced by their friend Andrew Jackson (who is also a songwriter) to the K-pop market, the duo started writing for the boy bands Shinhwa and Got7, which was Bonnick and Chapman's first work in the K-pop market. According to Chapman, LDN Noise then met SM Entertainment's A&R executives on a songwriting trip to Sweden during mid-2014, and started working with the label closely. They eventually earned their first writing and producing credit under SM with "View" by Shinee, which was a commercial success upon its release, and has since become a frequent collaborator with the label's artists.

In addition to their work with SM Entertainment, LDN Noise also contributed their work to several K-pop artists, notably including Sistar, Girl's Day, Astro and Twice as of 2020.

== Discography ==
=== Singles ===
Title	Year	Peak chart positions		Album
Title	Year	UK	AUS	Album
As a lead artist
"Want U"	2016	—	—	Non-album singles
"At Night"	2016	—	—	Non-album singles
"Facade" (feat. Tay Jasper)	2016	—	—	Non-album singles
"Tears" (with Pretty Sister)	2016	—	—	Non-album singles
"Loving You Tonight"	2016	—	—	Non-album singles
"Talk to My Body" (feat. Dominique)	2017	—	—	Non-album singles
"Rockstar"	2017	—	—	Non-album singles
"Spring"	2018	—	—	Seasons
"Summer"	2018	—	—	Seasons
"Autumn"	2018	—	—	Seasons
"Winter"	2018	—	—	Seasons
"Like I Do"	2018	—	—	Non-album singles
"Finally"	2018	—	—	Non-album singles
"My House" (feat. Moti)	2019	—	—	Non-album singles
"What You Won't Do For Love"	2019	—	—	Non-album singles
As a featured artist
"Walk By Faith (LDN Noise Remix)" (PYLO featuring LDN Noise)	2015	—	—	Non-album single
"I Ain't Missing You" (Aston Merrygold featuring LDN Noise)	2016	126	—	Showstopper
"Countdown" (Amber Liu featuring LDN Noise)	2018	—	—	Non-album single
Collaborations
"What I Live For" (vs KYA)	—	65	Non-album singles	
"My Show" (with Cha Ji-yeon)	2016	—	Non-album singles	—
"—" denotes releases that did not chart or were not released in that region.

== Production and songwriting credits ==
=== K-pop ===
==== S.M. Entertainment artists ====
Title	Year	Artist (s)	Album	Music		Arrangement	
Title	Year	Artist (s)	Album	Credited	With	Credited	With
"View"	2015	Shinee	Odd	Yes	Ryan S. Jhun, Adrian McKinnon	Yes	Ryan S. Jhun, Adrian McKinnon
"Komplicated"	2015	TVXQ	Rise as God	Yes	Tay Jasper	Yes	Tay Jasper
"Gemini"	2015	Taeyeon	I	Yes	Carolyn Jordan, Alice Sophie Penrose	Yes	—N/a
"Married to the Music"	2015	Shinee	Married to the Music	Yes	Zak Waters, Adrian McKinnon, Ryan S. Jhun	Yes	Zak Waters, Adrian McKinnon, Ryan S. Jhun
"Dumb Dumb"	2015	Red Velvet	The Red	Yes	Deanna Dellacioppa, Taylor Parks, Ryan S. Jhun	Yes	Deanna Dellacioppa, Taylor Parks, Ryan S. Jhun
"Campfire"	2015	Red Velvet	The Red	Yes	Taylor Parks, iDR, Ryan S. Jhun	Yes	Taylor Parks, iDR, Ryan S. Jhun
"Red Dress"	2015	Red Velvet	The Red	Yes	Rodnae "Chikk" Bell, Nermin Harambasic, Jin Suk Choi, Charite Viken, Ryan S. Jhun	Yes	Rodnae "Chikk" Bell, Nermin Harambasic, Jin Suk Choi, Charite Viken, Ryan S. Jhun
"Oh Boy"	2015	Red Velvet	The Red	Yes	Herbie Crichlow, Lauren Dyson, Jin Choi	Yes	Herbie Crichlow, Lauren Dyson, Jin Choi
"4 Walls"	2015	f(x)	4 Walls	Yes	Tay Jasper, Adrian McKinnon	Yes	—
"Rude Love"	2015	f(x)	4 Walls	Yes	Syron, Andrew Jackson	Yes	—
"Papi"	2015	f(x)	4 Walls	Yes	Kenzie, Shaun, Ylva Dimberg	Yes	Shaun
"Girl x Friend"	2015	Exo	Sing for You	Yes	Adrian McKinnon, Tay Jasper, Shaun	Yes	—
"On the Snow"	2015	Exo	Sing for You	Yes	Andrew Choi, Ylva Dimberg	Yes	—
"Lightsaber"	2015	Exo	Sing for You	Yes	Adrian McKinnon	Yes	—
"12:25 (Wish List)"	2015	f(x)	Winter Garden	Yes	Adrian McKinnon	Yes	—
"Guess Who"	2016	Taemin	Press It	Yes	Andrew Choi, Tay Jasper	Yes	SHAUN, David Choi
"Moon"	2016	Jonghyun	She Is	Yes	Jonghyun, Adrian McKinnon	Yes	—
"Dress Up"	2016	Jonghyun	She Is	Yes	Jonghyun	Yes	—
"Why"	2016	Taeyeon	Why	Yes	Lauren Dyson, Rodnae "Chikk" Bell	Yes	Lauren Dyson, Rodnae 'Chikk' Bell
"Fashion"	2016	Taeyeon	Why	Yes	Marissa Shipp, Brittany Mullen	Yes	Marissa Shipp, Brittany Mullen
"Up & Down" (featuring Hyoyeon)	2016	Taeyeon	Why	Yes	Ylva Dimberg, Herbie Crichlow	Yes	Ylva Dimberg, Herbie Crichlow,
"Good Thing"	2016	Taeyeon	Why	Yes	Alice Sophie Penrose, Carolyn Jordan	Yes	Alice Sophie Penrose, Carolyn Jordan
"Lucky One"	2016	Exo	Ex'Act	Yes	Andrew Choi, Adrian McKinnon	Yes	—
"Monster"	2016	Exo	Ex'Act	Yes	Kenzie, Rodnae "Chikk" Bell	Yes	Kenzie, Rodnae "Chikk" Bell
"White Noise"	2016	Exo	Ex'Act	Yes	Adrian McKinnon, Rodnae "Chikk" Bell	Yes	—
"Fire Truck"	2016	NCT 127	NCT 127	Yes	Tay Jasper, Ylva Dimberg	Yes	—
"Wake Up"	2016	NCT 127	NCT 127	Yes	Tay Jasper	Yes	—
"Switch" (featuring SR15B)	2016	NCT 127	NCT 127	Yes	Trey Campbell, Tay Jasper, Rosina 'Soaky' Russell	Yes	—
"All Mine"	2016	f(x)	Non-album single	Yes	Andre Merritt, Breana Marin	Yes	—
"Lotto"	2016	Exo	Lotto	Yes	Adrian McKinnon, Rodnae "Chikk" Bell	Yes	—
"Secret"	2016	Pantene X Yuri X Seohyun	Non-album single	No	—	Yes	—
"SHIFT"	2016	Shinee	1 of 1	Yes	Kenzie, Adrian McKinnon	Yes	Kenzie, Adrian McKinnon
"The One"	2016	Exo-CBX	Hey Mama!	Yes	Adrian McKinnon, Tay Jasper	Yes	—
"Zoo"	2017	Red Velvet	The Red Summer	Yes	Courtney Woolsey, Alice Penrose	Yes	—
"Forever"	2017	Exo	The War	Yes	Kenzie, Adrian McKinnon	Yes	—
"We Young"	2017	NCT Dream	We Young	Yes	Kenzie, Ylva Dimberg	Yes	—
"Power"	2017	Exo	The War: The Power of Music	Yes	James Matthew Norton	Yes	—
"Touch"	2018	NCT 127	NCT 2018 Empathy	Yes	Deez, Adrian McKinnon	Yes	Deez
"Puzzle"	2018	TVXQ	New Chapter No. 1: The Chance of Love	Yes	Adrian McKinnon, Tay Jasper	Yes	—
"Replay (PM 01:27)"	2018	NCT 127	Regular-Irregular	No	Bang Hye-hyun	Yes	Varren Wade
"Gravity"	2018	Exo	Don't Mess Up My Tempo	Yes	Deez, Adrian McKinnon	Yes	—
"Damage"	2018	Exo	Don't Mess Up My Tempo	Yes	Deez, Adrian McKinnon	Yes	—
"Forever Yours"(featuring Soyou)	2018	Key	Face	Yes	Daecolm Diego Holland	Yes	Daecolm Diego Holland
"So Good"	2018	Red Velvet	RBB	Yes	Deez, Ellen Berg Tollbom	Yes	Deez, Ellen Berg Tollbom
"Countdown (Feat. LDN Noise)"	2018	Amber Liu	Non-album single	Yes	Amber Liu	Yes	
"Say It"	2019	WayV	Take Off	Yes	Andrew Choi, Lauren Dyson	Yes	Andrew Choi, Lauren Dyson
"불러 (Hit Me Up)"(featuring Giriboy)	2019	U-Know	True Colors	Yes	Ebenezer	Yes	—
"Ice Queen"	2019	Baekhyun	City Lights	Yes	Adrian McKinnon, Bobii Loves	Yes	—
"Jopping"	2019	SuperM	SuperM	Yes	Tay Jasper, Adrian McKinnon, Nasla Jones, Geoffrey McCray, Zachary Chicoine, Marcus Scoutt	Yes	Yoo Young-jin
"2 Fast"	2019	SuperM	SuperM	Yes	Adrian McKinnon, Ebenezer	Yes	—
"Love Talk"	2019	WayV	Take Over the Moon	Yes	Adrian McKinnon, Ebenezer Fabiyi	Yes	—
"Love You Like Crazy"	2019	Taeyeon	Purpose	Yes	Kenzie	Yes	Kenzie
"Butterfly Effect"	2019	Exo	Obsession	Yes	Lee Seu-ran	Yes	Adrian McKinnon
"Dreams Come True"	2020	NCT 127	Neo Zone & Neo Zone: The Final Round	Yes	Deez, Bobii Lewis	Yes	Deez
"Non Stop"	2020	NCT 127	Neo Zone & Neo Zone: The Final Round	Yes	Kenzie, Adrian McKinnon	Yes	—
"Only Human"	2020	WayV	Awaken the World	Yes	Jeremy "Tay" Jasper, Dylan Huling	Yes	–
"Drip"	2020	SuperM	Super One	Yes	Keynon "KC" Moore (3Sixty), Jeremy "Tay" Jasper, Zachary Chicoine	Yes	–
"Dangerous Woman"	2020	SuperM	Super One	Yes	Maegan Cottone, Stephan Benson (Misunderstood), Jeffrey Okyere-Twumasi (Misunderstood)	Yes	–
"일식 (Black Rose)(feat .Kid Milli)"	2020	Taemin	Never Gonna Dance Again Act 1	Yes	Deez, Adrian McKinnon	Yes	Deez
"L.O.V.E"	2020	BoA	Better	Yes	Kenzie	Yes	–
"Lipstick"	2021	NCT 127	Loveholic	Yes	Deez, Ebenezer Olaoluwa Fabiyi, Adrian McKinnon	Yes	–
"Cry For Love"	2021	Baekhyun	Bambi	Yes	Stephan Benson	Yes	–
"Superstar"	2021	Shinee	Superstar	Yes	Lenno Linjama, Andrew Jackson, Iain James	Yes	Lenno Linjiama
"Miracle"	2021	WayV	Universe	Yes	Justin Starling, Jeffrey Okyere-Twumasi, Adrian McKinnon	Yes	–
"To My First"	2022	NCT Dream	Beatbox	Yes	Aston Merrygold, Karen Poole	Yes	–
"Guilty Pleasure"	2022	Key	Gasoline	Yes	Adrian McKinnon, Deez	Yes	Deez
"Runaway"	2022	Minho	Chase	Yes	Tay Jasper	Yes	–
"Jet"	2022	Eunhyuk, Hyoyeon, Taeyong, Jaemin, Sungchan, Giselle and Winter	2022 Winter SM Town: SMCU Palace	Yes	Karin Wilhelmina Eurenius, Tay Jasper	Yes	–
"Bounce Back"	2022	WayV	Phantom	Yes	Adrian McKinnon	Yes	Adrian McKinnon
"Best Friend Ever"	2023	NCT Dream	Best Friend Ever	Yes	Boy Matthews	Yes	–
"Easy"	2023	Key	Killer	Yes	JQ Smith, Dewain Whitmore Jr.	Yes	–
"Kiss"	2023	NCT DoJaeJung	Perfume	Yes	Sevn Dayz, Jeffrey the Kidd, Young Chance, Jay Jay	Yes	Jay Jay
"Dive"	2023	NCT DoJaeJung	Perfume	Yes	Lauren Faith	Yes	–
"The Feeling"	2023	Shinee	Hard	Yes	Adrian McKinnon	Yes	Imlay
"No Makeup"	2023	Exo	Exist	Yes	Adrian McKinnon, Sevn Dayz	Yes	–
"On the road"	2023	Chen	Polaris	Yes	Adrian McKinnon, Deez	Yes	Deez
"Alley Oop"	2023	Nct U	Golden Age	Yes	Justin Starling, Josue Janv'ier	Yes	–
"Wonder"	2023	D.O.	Expectation	Yes	Shorelle, Adien Lewis	Yes	–
"Ain't No Thang"	2023	WayV	On My Youth	Yes	Justin Starling, Miles Barker	Yes	–
"INVINCIBLE"	2023	WayV	On My Youth	Yes	Jeffery the KiDDD, Robbie Jay	Yes	–
"RODEO"	2023	WayV	On My Youth	Yes	Justin Starling	Yes	–
"Moonlight"	2023	WayV	On My Youth	Yes	Jeffery The KiDDD, Sevn Dayz, Tay Jasper	Yes	–
"Be Alright"	2023	WayV	On My Youth	Yes	Jeffery The KiDDD, Sevn Dayz	Yes	–
"Wings"	2023	Red Velvet	Chill Kill	Yes	Adrian McKinnon, Taet Chesterton, Sevn Dayz	Yes	–
"Box"	2024	NCT Dream	Dream()scape	Yes	Danny Shah, Taet Chesterton, Mark	Yes	–
"New Ride"	2024	WayV	Give Me That	Yes	Lenno Linjama, Jeffrey the Kiddd, Adrian Mckinnon	Yes	Lenno
"Fresh"	2024	Key	Tongue Tied	Yes	Kenzie, H. Toyosaki, Adrian McKinnon	Yes	–
"NASA"	2024	NCT Wish	Wishful	Yes	Jeremy "Tay" Jasper, Justin Starling, Young Chance, Shorelle	Yes	–
"WOAH"	2025	WayV	Big Bands	Yes	Adrian McKinnon, Justin Starling	Yes	H33RA
"Angel #48"	2025	Aespa	Rich Man	Yes	Kenzie, Wilhelmina	Yes	–
"Moment in Time"	2025	WayV	Eternal White	Yes	Adrian McKinnon	Yes	–
"Someday"	2026	NCT Wish	Wishlist	Yes	Jordan Shaw, Colin Magalong	Yes	–
"Hours"	2026	Shinee	Atmos	Yes	Kenzie, Adrian McKinnon	Yes	–
"Vision Wings"	2026	WayV	Vision Wings	Yes	Cryptic, Adrian McKinnon, Justin Starling	Yes	Cryptic
"Fall 4 U"	2026	Red Velvet – Irene & Seulgi	Cheetah	Yes	Lauren Faith	Yes	–

==== Other K-pop artists ====
Title	Year	Artist (s)	Album	Music		Arrangement	
Title	Year	Artist (s)	Album	Credited	With	Credited	With
"Just Tonight"	2014	Got7	Identify	Yes	Myron Jordine	Yes	—
"Cat"	2015	Shinhwa	We	Yes	Casper, Kyle Coleman, Ryan Kim, Christopher Dotson	Yes	Casper, Kyle Coleman, Ryan Kim, Christopher Dotson
"Sniper"	2015	Shinhwa	We	Yes	Andrew Jackson, Sabastian Lundberg	Yes	Andrew Jackson, Sabastian Lundberg
"Ice Moon"	2015	Shinhwa	We	Yes	Andrew Jackson	Yes	Andrew Jackson
"Fingertips (Pinkrush)"	2016	I.O.I	35 Girls 5 Concepts	Yes	Ryan S. Jhun, Kristy Lee Peters, Melanie Joy Fontana, Michel Sebastian Maximilian Schulz	Yes	Ryan S. Jhun, Kristy Lee Peters, Melanie Joy Fontana, Michel Sebastian Maximilian Schulz
"Get Down"	2016	Boys Republic	BR: Evolution	Yes	August Rigo, Jarah Gibson, Kyle Coleman, Ryan S.Jhun	Yes	August Rigo, Jarah Gibson, Kyle Coleman, Ryan S.Jhun
"Come and Get Me"	2016	Sistar	Insane Love	Yes	Rovin	Yes	Rovin
"My Show"	2016	Cha Ji-yeon X LDN Noise	Non-album single	Yes	Lauren Dyson, Adrian McKinnon	Yes	—
"Thirsty"	2017	Girl's Day	Everyday #5	Yes	Alice Sophie Penrose, Carolyn Jordan, Ryan S. Jhun, Jo Miswell	Yes	Alice Sophie Penrose, Carolyn Jordan, Ryan S. Jhun, Jo Miswell
"Worldwide"	2017	iKON	New Kids: Begin	Yes	KUSH, B.I	Yes	—
"Crazy Sexy Cool"	2017	Astro	Dream Part.02	Yes	Adrian McKinnon	Yes	Adrian McKinnon
"Black Heart"	2018	UNB	Black Heart	Yes	Ryan S. Jhun	Yes	Ryan S. Jhun
"Oh! Oh!"	2019	Berry Good	Fantastic	Yes	Paul Johnson, Jo Michael, Ylva Dimberg, Ryan S. Jhun	Yes	Paul Johnson, Jo Michael, Ylva Dimberg, Ryan S. Jhun
"All Night"	2019	Astro	All Light	Yes	Kyler Niko	Yes	—
"Water"	2019	The Boyz	Dreamlike	Yes	Gustav Karlstrom, 9ROTA, 조미쉘 (Singing Beetle)	Yes	Gustav Karlstrom, 9ROTA, 조미쉘 (Singing Beetle)
"Dumb"	2019	Bvndit	BE!	Yes	Anne Judith Stokke Wik, Karen Poole	Yes	—
"Shadow"	2020	Twice	More & More	Yes	Chloe Latimer, Hannah Wilson	Yes	—
"Surf"	2020	Itzy	Not Shy	Yes	Sunshine (Cazzi Opeia, Ellen Berg)	Yes	—
"Revolution"	2020	AleXa	DECOHERENCE	Yes	Anne Judith Stokke Wik, Ronny Svendsen, Nermin Harambasic	Yes	Anne Judith Stokke Wik, Ronny Svendsen, Nermin Harambasic
"Believer"	2020	Twice	Eyes Wide Open	Yes	Kenzie, Alice Penrose	Yes	Kenzie, Alice Penrose
"Last Carnival"	2020	Monsta X	Fatal Love	Yes	Jeremy Jasper, Adrian McKinnon	Yes	—
"1+1"	2021	Pentagon	Love or Take	Yes	Cazzi Opelia, Gabriel Brandes	Yes	—
"Go Big or Go Home"	2021	Enhypen	Dimension: Dilemma	Yes	—	Yes	—
"Blockbuster"	2021	Enhypen	Dimension: Dilemma	Yes	—	Yes	Adrian McKinnon, Jeremy "Tay" Jasper, Dylan Huling
"Pop!"	2022	Nayeon	Im Nayeon	Yes	Kenzie, Ellen Berg	Yes	—
"What I Want"	2022	Itzy	Checkmate	Yes	Karin Wilhemina Eurenius	Yes	Wilhemina
"Queen of Hearts"	2022	Twice	Between 1&2	Yes	Paulina Cerrilla, Kyler Niko	Yes	—
"Crazy Stupid Love"	2023	Twice	Ready to Be	Yes	Dahyun, Lenno	Yes	Lenno
"Love Me Like This"	2023	Nmixx	Expérgo	Yes	Taet Chesterton, Gavin Jones	Yes	—
"Billionaire"	2023	Nana Suyun Yeonhee Wooyeon Yuki Jihan & Kei	Queendom Puzzle Final	Yes	Kenzie, Courtney Jenaé	Yes	—
"A.I.BAE"	2023	Le'v	A.I.BAE	Yes	Adrian McKinnon, Peter Renshaw, Jeremy "Tay" Jasper	Yes	—
"Exchange ID"	2023	Le'v	A.I.BAE	Yes	Kenyon Moore	Yes	—
"17" (featuring Hwasa)	2023	Wheein	In the Mood	Yes	Deez, Ylva Dimberg	Yes	—
"Honey"	2023	The Boyz	Phantasy Pt.2 Sixth Sense	Yes	Jyll	Yes	Jyll
"Run For Roses"	2024	Nmixx	Fe3O4: Break	Yes	Taet Chesterton, Danny Shah	Yes	—
"Q&A"	2024	Hyuna	Attitude	Yes	GroovyRoom, Peter Renshaw, Shorelle YoungChance, Hyuna	Yes	GroovyRoom, Peter Renshaw, Noisy Choice
"Going On"	2025	Rescene	Glow Up	Yes	Wilhelmina	Yes	—
"404 (New Era)"	2026	KiiiKiii	Delulu Pack	Yes	Ellen Berg, Cazzi Opeia	Yes	—
"Smoke & Mirrors"	2026	Lay	Flawed Crown	Yes	—	Yes	—
"Born Dire"	2026	Alpha Drive One	Unbreakable: 少年Beast	Yes	Justin Starling	Yes	—
"Kick Off The Wall" (featuring Iann Dior)	2026	KickFlip	Kick Off The Wall Pt.1	Yes	Young Chance, Michael Olmo, William Asingh	Yes	—
"French Kissing"	2026	And2ble	Sequence 02: Attraction	Yes	Wilhelmina, Robinson (FRA), 72, Glaile, Vision EXE	Yes	Glaile, Vision EXE
"Beautiful"	2026	And2ble	Sequence 02: Attraction	Yes	Hyke, Wilhelmina, 72	Yes	—

=== Others ===
Title	Year	Artist(s)	Album	Credits			
Title	Year	Artist(s)	Album	Music	With	Lyrics	With
"Turn Up the Music"	2012	Chris Brown	Fortune	No	—	Yes	Chris Brown, Harvey Mason, Jr., Damon Thomas, Alexander Palmer, Michael Jimenez, Terence Coles
"What I Live For" (vs. LDN Noise)	2014	KYA	Non-album single	Yes	—	Yes	
"Rebound"	2014	Tay Jasper	Non-album single	Yes	—	No	—
"Kiss Me Quick"	2015	Nathan Sykes	Unfinished Business	Yes	Choi	Yes	Nathan Sykes, Ali Tennant, Jin Choi
"Recover" (featuring Remi)	2015	KLP	Non-album single	Yes	—	No	—
"Simple Love"	2015	Markus Feehily	Fire	No	—	Yes	Markus Feehily, Mark Mehigan, Leon Price, Conor O'Donoghue
"This Ain't Over"	2016	Alex Newell	POWER EP	Yes	—	Yes	Andrew Jackson
"Work, Flip, Shine"	2016	Tay Jasper	Non-album single	Yes	—	No	—
"New Girl"	2016	Reggie 'n' Bollie	Non-album single	Yes	Iain James, Afterhrs, Space Primates	No	—
"Testify"	2016	Nick Jonas	Last Year Was Complicated	Yes	—	Yes	Nick Jonas, Whitmore Jr., Patrick "J. Que" Smith
"Freedom"	2016	Nathan Sykes	Unfinished Business	Yes	—	Yes	Nathan Skyes, Ali Tennant
"Taken"	2016	Nathan Sykes	Unfinished Business	Yes	Pretty Sister, Jarred K, AC Burrell, Kyle Townsend	No	—
"Red Alert"	2018	Double Seven Boys	Red Alert	Yes	—	No	—
"The One"	2018	Double Seven Boys	Red Alert	Yes	—	No	—
"Dream World Tour"	2018	NEX7	THE FIRST II	Yes	Ryan S. Jhun, Adrian McKinnon, Jeremy Jasper, Kameron Alexander	No	—
"无我 (WORK)"	2018	ONER	过敏 (ALLERGY)	Yes	—	No	—
"炫实 (DAZZLE)"	2018	ONER	过敏 (ALLERGY)	Yes	—	No	—
"瞬 (ALL FALLS DOWN)"	2018	ONER	过敏 (ALLERGY)	Yes	—	No	—
"Straight to My Heart"	2020	Louise	Heavy Love	Yes	Phil Cook, Ash Howes	Yes	Alice Penrose, James Norton
"White Lies"	2022	Ocean Tisdall	Boys Don’t Cry	Yes	Mike Summers, Moroccan Rap Trolls	Yes	Mike Summers, Ocean Tisdall, Moroccan Rap Trolls
"secret trip"	2022	Reol	Black Box	Yes	Reol	No	–
"Freaky"	2026	Amane Rena	Rocket Science	Yes	Wilhelmina	No	–
"Love Got Me Ooh"	2026	A20 May	Love Got Me Ooh	Yes	–	No	–
