= Monster (Exo song) =

2016 single by Exo

- LDN Noise Creeper Bass remix cover

Single by Exo

from the album Ex'Act
- Language: Korean; Mandarin
- Released: June 9, 2016
- Recorded: 2016
- Studio: SM Blue Cup (Seoul); Sound Pool (Seoul); InGrid (Seoul)
- Genre: K-pop; hip hop; electro-R&B
- Length: 3:41
- Label: SM; KT Music
- Composers: Kenzie; LDN Noise; Rodnae 'Chikk' Bell
- Lyricists: Kenzie, Deepflow (Korean); Kevin Yi (Chinese)
- Producers: Kenzie; LDN Noise

Exo Korean and Chinese singles chronology
"Lucky One" (2016)	"Monster" (2016)	"Lotto" (2016)

Music videos
- "Monster" (Korean Ver.) on YouTube
- "Monster" (Chinese Ver.) on YouTube

"Monster" is a song by South Korean–Chinese boy band Exo, released on June 9, 2016, as the second single from their third studio album Ex'Act. It was released in both Korean and Chinese versions by their label SM Entertainment.

== Background and release ==
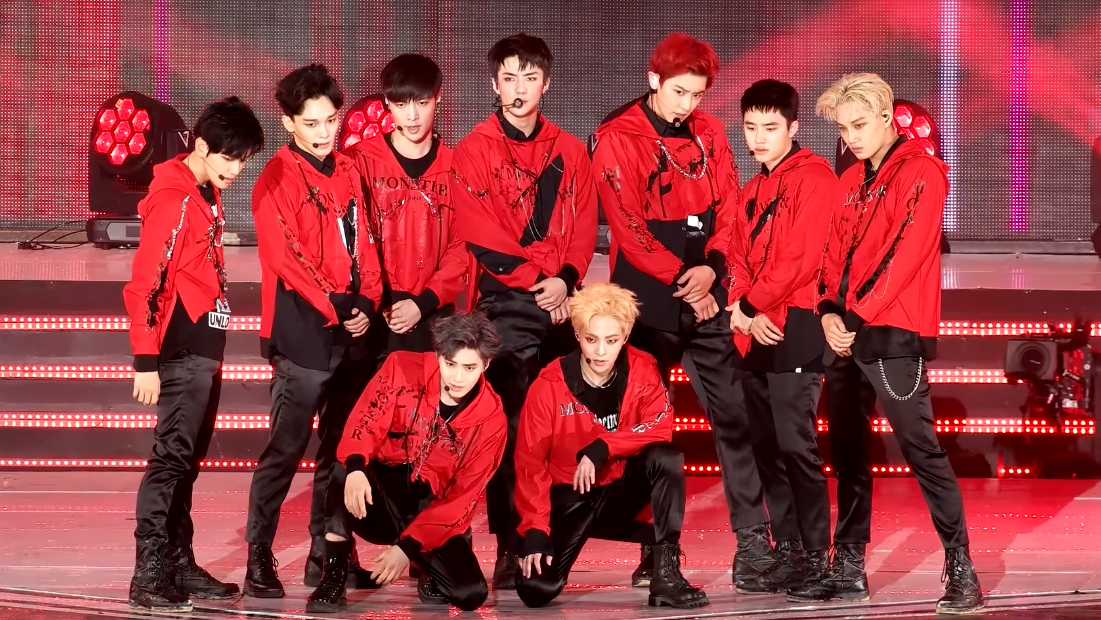
Exo performing "Monster" in June 2016

Composed and arranged by Kenzie, LDN Noise, and Rodnae "Chikk" Bell, with the Korean lyrics written by Kenzie and Deepflow and the Chinese lyrics written by Kevin Yi, "Monster" is described as a "dark and intense" medium-tempo dance song with lyrics about a man's "excessive fixation on his lover". The song served as one of the "double title tracks" for Ex'Act, the other being "Lucky One", and was released together with the album on June 9, 2016. Exo began performing the song on South Korean music TV shows on the same day.

== Music videos ==
The Korean and Chinese music videos for "Monster" were released one hour after the song itself. Apart from Exo's performances of the song at various settings, the videos also depict the members as rebels that were eventually captured but ultimately released from a prisoner transport vehicle by Baekhyun, who has been disguised as the driver. The Korean version was the fourth most-watched K-pop music video on YouTube in 2016. An additional music video exclusively showcasing the song's choreography was released on June 15, 2016.

On June 8, 2018, the Korean music video exceeded 200 million views on YouTube, and on November 13, 2019 it exceeded 300 million, becoming their first music video to achieve both milestones, as of now, the music video reached 400 million becoming their 2nd highest watched music video on Youtube.

== Reception ==
"Monster" topped both South Korea's Gaon Digital Chart and the Billboard World Digital Songs chart, becoming Exo's first number one on the latter. The song won first place nine times in total on South Korean weekly music TV shows, and was the most awarded song by a boy group in 2016. It was nominated for Song of the Year at the 18th Mnet Asian Music Awards, and was named the second and third best K-pop songs of 2016 by Dazed and Billboard respectively.

Listicles
Critic/Publication	List	Rank	Ref.
Billboard	The 20 Best K-Pop Songs of 2016	3	
Fuse	The 20 Best Songs of 2016	2	
Dazed	The 20 best K-Pop tracks of the year	2	

Music program awards
Program	Date
Show Champion	June 22, 2016
M Countdown	June 16, 2016
M Countdown	June 23, 2016
M Countdown	June 30, 2016
Music Bank	June 17, 2016
Music Bank	June 24, 2016
Music Bank	July 1, 2016
Inkigayo	June 19, 2016
Inkigayo	June 26, 2016

== Credits and personnel ==
Credits adapted from album's liner notes.

=== Studio ===
- SM Blue Cup Studio – recording
- SM Big Shot Studio – digital editing
- SM Yellow Tail Studio – mixing
- Sound Pool Studio – recording
- Ingrid Studio – recording
- Sterling Sound – mastering

=== Personnel ===
- SM Entertainment – executive producer
- Lee Soo-man – producer
- Exo – vocals
  - D.O. – background vocals
  - Chen – background vocals
  - Chanyeol – background vocals
- Kenzie – producer, Korean lyrics, composition, arrangement, vocal directing
- Deepflow – Korean lyrics
- Kevin Yi – Chinese lyrics
- MQ – vocal directing
- Rodnae "Chikk" Bell – composition, arrangement, background vocals
- LDN Noise – producer, composition, arrangement
- Jung Eui-seok – recording
- Jung Ho-jin – recording
- Jung Eun-kyung – recording
- Lee Min-gyu – digital editing
- Gu Jong-pil – mixing
- Tom Coyne – mastering

== Charts ==
=== Weekly charts ===
Chart (2016)	Peak position
Hong Kong (HKRIA)	17
Japan (Japan Hot 100)	9
South Korea (Gaon)	1
UK Indie (Official Charts)	18
UK Singles Downloads (Official Charts)	78
US World Digital Songs (Billboard)	1

=== Year-end charts ===
Chart (2016)	Position
South Korea (Gaon)	60
US World Digital Songs (Billboard)	6

== Sales ==
Region	Sales
South Korea (Gaon)	1,016,599
United States (Nielsen)	69,000

== Release history ==
Region	Date	Format	Version	Label
Various	June 9, 2016	Digital download; streaming	Original	SM; Genie
Various	August 5, 2016	Digital download; streaming	LDN Noise Creeper Bass remix	SM; Genie
