= For Life (EP) =

- Digital cover

EP by Exo
- Released: December 19, 2016
- Recorded: 2016
- Studio: Doobdoob (Seoul); In Grid (Seoul); MonoTree (Seoul); SM Blue Cup (Seoul); SM Blue Ocean (Seoul); SM Concert Hall (Seoul); SM Yellow Tail (Seoul)
- Genre: Pop; R&B; hip hop
- Length: 35:58
- Language: Korean; Mandarin; English
- Label: SM; KT Music

Exo chronology
Ex'Act (2016)	For Life (2016)	The War (2017)

Singles from For Life
- 1. "For Life" Released: December 19, 2016

For Life is the fifth extended play by South Korean–Chinese boy band Exo. It was released on December 19, 2016, by SM Entertainment. The album contains five tracks, including the single of the same name, in both Korean and Chinese versions. It was the last album to feature Lay before his extended hiatus.

== Background and release ==
On November 30, 2016, Exo was confirmed to be releasing their fifth extended play and third special winter album, after Miracles in December (2013) and Sing for You (2015). On December 13, the album's title was announced to be For Life. The album and title track's music videos, which feature Japanese actress Nanami Sakuraba alongside three Exo members Kai, Suho and Chanyeol, were released simultaneously on December 19. Unlike Exo's previous albums which were released in separate Korean and Chinese versions, For Life contains both the Korean and Chinese versions of the tracks. Profits from the album are reportedly donated to charity.

== Commercial performance ==
Within the first week of its release, For Life sold over 300,000 copies–Exo's second best first week album sales and the third best first week sales in the history of South Korean album sales chart Hanteo. The album debuted at number one on South Korea's Gaon Album Chart. For Life became the third best selling album in Gaon Chart in 2016 with 438,481 copies sold.

== Track listing ==
Credits adapted from Naver. Unlike Exo's previous albums which were released in separate Korean and Chinese versions, For Life contains both the Korean and Chinese versions of the tracks in one release.

For Life
No.	Title	Lyrics	Music	Arrangement	Length
1.	"For Life"	Kenzie	Kenzie; Matthew Tishler; Aaron Benward	Kenzie; Matthew Tishler; Aaron Benward	3:58
2.	"Falling for You"	Seo Ji-eum	Dominique "DOM" Rodriguez (Audity); Richard Garcia (Audity); Andreas Stone Johansson; Allison Kaplan	Dominique "DOM" Rodriguez (Audity); Richard Garcia (Audity); Andreas Stone Johansson; Allison Kaplan	3:24
3.	"What I Want for Christmas" (sung by Suho, Baekhyun, Chen, D.O.)	JQ (Makeumine Works); Seolim (Makeumine Works)	BUM (Joombas); Chek Parren (Joombas); J. Lewis; Sidnie Tipton	Joombas	3:22
4.	"Twenty Four" (sung by Xiumin, Chanyeol, Kai, Sehun)	Lee Yoo-jin	Joseph "Joe Millionaire" Foster; Jeremy "Tay" Jasper; Leven Kali; Otha "Vakseen" Davis III; MZMC	Joseph "Joe Millionaire" Foster	3:40
5.	"Winter Heat"	Kim Min-ji	Andreas Öberg; Maria Marcus; Andrew Choi	Maria Marcus	3:35
6.	"For Life (一生一事)"	Kenzie; Xiaohan	Kenzie; Matthew Tishler; Aaron Benward	Kenzie; Matthew Tishler; Aaron Benward	3:58
7.	"Falling for You (亿万分之一的奇迹)"	Seo Ji-eum; Yang Yao-cheng	Dominique "DOM" Rodriguez (Audity); Richard Garcia (Audity); Andreas Stone Johansson; Allison Kaplan	Dominique "DOM" Rodriguez (Audity); Richard Garcia (Audity); Andreas Stone Johansson; Allison Kaplan	3:24
8.	"What I Want for Christmas (再续冬季)" (sung by Lay, Baekhyun, Chen, D.O.)	JQ (Makeumine Works); Seolim (Makeumine Works); DeerJenny	BUM (Joombas); Chek Parren (Joombas); J. Lewis; Sidnie Tipton	Joombas	3:22
9.	"Twenty Four (二十四小时)" (sung by Xiumin, Chanyeol, Kai, Sehun)	Sun Yien	Joseph "Joe Millionaire" Foster; Jeremy "Tay" Jasper; Leven Kali; Otha "Vakseen" Davis III; MZMC	Joseph "Joe Millionaire" Foster	3:40
10.	"Winter Heat (暖冬)"	Kim Min-ji; Xiaohan	Andreas Öberg; Maria Marcus; Andrew Choi	Maria Marcus	3:35
Total length:					35:58

== Charts ==
=== Weekly charts ===
Chart (2016)	Peak position
South Korean Albums (Gaon)	1
Japanese Albums (Oricon)	7
US World Albums (Billboard)	9

=== Monthly charts ===
Chart (2016)	Peak position
South Korean Albums (Gaon)	1

=== Year-end charts ===
Chart (2016)	Peak position
Chinese Albums (YinYueTai Vchart)	5
South Korean Albums (Gaon)	3
Chart (2017)	Peak position
Chinese Albums (YinYueTai Vchart)	21
Chart (2018)	Peak position
Chinese Albums (YinYueTai Vchart)	33

== Sales ==
Region	Sales
China (Xiami)	269,004+
Japan (Oricon)	22,826+
South Korea (Gaon)	442,592+

== Awards and nominations ==
Year	Award	Category	Nominated work	Result
2017	6th Gaon Chart Music Awards	Artist of the Year (Album) – 4th Quarter	For Life	Nominated

=== Music program awards ===
Song	Program	Date
"For Life"
"For Life"	Music Bank (KBS)	December 30, 2016

== Release history ==
Region	Date	Format	Label	Ref
South Korea	December 19, 2016	CD	SM; KT Music	
Various	December 19, 2016	Digital download; streaming	SM	
Taiwan	January 20, 2017	CD	Avex Taiwan	
