= Ex'Act =

- Korean digital and Lucky One version cover

Studio album by Exo
- Released: June 9, 2016
- Recorded: 2016
- Studios: Doobdoob (Seoul); In Grid (Seoul); MonoTree (Seoul); SM Big Shot (Seoul); SM Blue Cup (Seoul); SM Yellow Tail (seoul); Sound Pool (Seoul)
- Genres: K-pop; R&B; electronic
- Length: 41:19; 48:20 (Lotto repackage)
- Languages: Korean; Mandarin; English
- Labels: SM; KT Music
- Producers: Lee Soo-man; LDN Noise

Exo chronology
Sing for You (2015)	Ex'Act (2016)	For Life (2016)

Singles from Ex'Act
- 1. "Lucky One" Released: June 9, 2016; 2. "Monster" Released: June 9, 2016

Repackaged edition cover
- Korean version cover

Singles from Lotto
- 1. "Lotto" Released: August 18, 2016

Ex'Act (stylized in all caps) is the third studio album by South Korean boy band Exo. It was released by SM Entertainment in Korean and Chinese versions on June 9, 2016. The album was re-released under the title Lotto on August 18, 2016. Ex'Act became Exo's fourth consecutive album to have won the MAMA Award for Album of the Year. The album went on to sell over 830,000 copies by 2022, with its repackage Lotto selling over 410,000 copies.

== Background and release ==
On May 31, 2016, Exo was announced to be releasing their third studio album. On June 2, it was revealed that the album's title was Ex'Act and Exo would be simultaneously promoting two singles, "Lucky One" and "Monster", with different visual concepts that correspond with the two versions of physical packagings for the album.

On June 7, 2016, it was revealed that notable music producers including Kenzie, The Stereotypes, and Dem Jointz participated in the production of the album, and member Chanyeol co-wrote the lyrics for the track "Heaven". Ex'Act and the music videos for its singles were released on June 9.

A re-packaged edition of the album, titled Lotto, was released on August 18, 2016. The edition adds four new songs including "Lotto", "Can't Bring Me Down", "She's Dreaming" which was written by member Chen, and a remix of "Monster" by LDN Noise.

== Promotion ==
A promotional showcase for Ex'Act was held at Olympic Hall, Seoul on June 8, 2016. Exo began performing the album's singles on South Korean music television programs on June 9. They embarked on their third headlining concert tour The Exo'rdium in July 2016.

Exo began promoting the repackaged edition Lotto by performing the title track on South Korean music television programs on August 19. Member Kai was absent from promotional activities due to an injury he sustained during the concert tour. KBS, MBC, and Mnet deemed "Lotto" "unfit for broadcast", thus Exo promoted the song with modified lyrics under an alternative title, "Louder", on these TV channels.

== Singles ==
"Monster" and "Lucky One" peaked at number one and three respectively on the Billboard World Digital Songs chart, and at number one and five respectively on the Gaon weekly digital chart. "Monster" went on to win first place nine times in total on South Korean weekly music television shows.

"Lotto" debuted at number two on the Gaon weekly digital chart and at number one on the Billboard World Digital Songs chart. The song went on to win first place seven times in total on South Korean weekly music television shows.

== Commercial performance ==
=== Ex'Act ===
Prior to its release, Ex'Act received a record-breaking pre-order by retail outlets of over 660,000 physical copies. Three days after its release, the album became the fastest selling album in the history of South Korean album sales chart Hanteo at the time with over 450,000 physical copies sold, breaking the record previously held by Exo's fourth extended play Sing for You (2015).

The Korean and Chinese versions of the album debuted at number one and two respectively on the Gaon weekly album chart. Both versions combined, the album debuted and peaked at number 2 on the Billboard World Albums chart. On October 22, 2017, the Korean Music Copyright Association revealed that "Monster" was the most streamed song of 2016 on two major South Korean music sites, Melon and Genie. It accumulated 190,898,389 and 36,688,492 million streams on each platform respectively, making Exo the most streamed group of 2016.

=== Lotto ===
The Korean and Chinese versions of Lotto debuted at number one and two respectively on the Gaon weekly album chart. By the end of August 2016, Ex'Act and its repackage had collectively sold 1,136,104 copies.

== Accolades ==
Awards and nominations
Year	Award	Nominated work	Category	Result
2016	Melon Music Awards	Ex'Act	Album of the Year	Nominated
2016	Mnet Asian Music Awards	Ex'Act	Album of the Year	Won
2017	Gaon Chart Music Awards	Ex'Act (Korean ver.)	Album of the Year – 2nd Quarter	Won
2017	Gaon Chart Music Awards	Ex'Act (Chinese ver.)	Album of the Year – 2nd Quarter	Nominated
2017	Gaon Chart Music Awards	Lotto (Korean ver.)	Album of the Year – 3rd Quarter	Won
2017	Gaon Chart Music Awards	Lotto (Chinese ver.)	Album of the Year – 3rd Quarter	Nominated
2017	Golden Disc Awards	Ex'Act	Album Bonsang	Won
2017	Golden Disc Awards	Ex'Act	Album Daesang	Won

== Track listing ==
Ex'Act – Korean version
No.	Title	Lyrics	Music	Arrangement	Length
1.	"Lucky One"	JQ (Makeumine Works); Seolim (Makeumine Works); Choi Jin-seon (Makeumine Works); Jang Yeo-jin (Makeumine Works)	LDN Noise; Andrew Choi; Adrian McKinnon	LDN Noise	3:47
2.	"Monster"	Kenzie; Deepflow	Kenzie; LDN Noise; Rodnae "Chikk" Bell	Kenzie; LDN Noise; Rodnae "Chikk" Bell	3:41
3.	"Artificial Love"	JQ (Makeumine Works); Ji Ye-won (Makeumine Works); Seolim (Makeumine Works)	Timothy "BOS" Bullock; Adrian McKinnon; Jeremy "Tay" Jasper; MZMC	Timothy "BOS" Bullock	4:05
4.	"Cloud 9"	Misfit	Dem Jointz; Ericka Coulter; Deez; Ryan S. Jhun	Dem Jointz; Ericka Coulter; Deez; Ryan S. Jhun	4:01
5.	"Heaven"	Chanyeol; Min Yeon-jae (lalala Studio)	The Stereotypes; Clarence Coffee Jr.; Tesung Kim (Iconic Sounds)	The Stereotypes; Clarence Coffee Jr.; Tesung Kim (Iconic Sounds)	3:45
6.	"White Noise" (백색소음; Baeksaeng So-eum)	Seo Ji-eum	LDN Noise; Adrian McKinnon; Rodnae "Chikk" Bell	LDN Noise	3:32
7.	"One and Only" (유리어항; Yuri-eohang; lit. 'Glass Fishbowl')	Park Seong-hee	Joseph "Joe Millionaire" Foster; Carl "Chip" Days Jr.; Otha "Vakseen" Davis III	Joseph "Joe Millionaire" Foster	3:49
8.	"They Never Know"	Jo Yoon-kyung	MZMC; Jamil "Digi" Chammas; Adrian McKinnon; Jeremy "Tay" Jasper; Leven Kali; Otha "Vakseen" Davis III	MZMC; Jamil "Digi" Chammas	3:33
9.	"Stronger" (Sung by Suho, Baekhyun, Chen, D.O.)	Jung Joo-hee; Agnes Shin (MonoTree)	Andreas Öberg; Gustav Karlström; Lee Joo-hyoung (MonoTree)	Andreas Öberg; Gustav Karlström	3:39
10.	"Lucky One" (Instrumental)		Adrian McKinnon; Andrew Choi; LDN Noise	LDN Noise	3:47
11.	"Monster" (Instrumental)		Kenzie; LDN Noise; Rodnae "Chikk" Bell	Kenzie; LDN Noise; Rodnae "Chikk" Bell	3:47
Total length:					41:26

Ex'Act – Chinese version
No.	Title	Lyrics	Music	Arrangement	Length
1.	"Lucky One" (Chinese Version)	JQ (Makeumine Works); Seolim (Makeumine Works); Choi Jin-seon (Makeumine Works); Jang Yeo-jin (lalala Studio); Arys Chien	LDN Noise; Andrew Choi; Adrian McKinnon	LDN Noise	3:47
2.	"Monster" (Chinese Version)	Kenzie; Deepflow; Kevin Yi	Kenzie; LDN Noise; Rodnae "Chikk" Bell	Kenzie; LDN Noise; Rodnae "Chikk" Bell	3:41
3.	"Artificial Love" (Chinese Version)	JQ (Makeumine Works); Seolim (Makeumine Works); Ji Ye-won (Makeumine Works); Dom.T (Makeumine Works)	Timothy "BOS" Bullock; Adrian McKinnon; Jeremy "Tay" Jasper; MZMC	Timothy "BOS" Bullock	4:05
4.	"Cloud 9" (Chinese Version)	Misfit; Lin Xinye	Dem Jointz; Ericka Coulter; Deez; Ryan S. Jhun	Dem Jointz; Ericka Coulter; Deez; Ryan S. Jhun	4:01
5.	"Heaven" (Chinese Version)	Chanyeol; Min Yeon-jae (lalala Studio); DeerJenny	The Stereotypes; Clarence Coffee Jr.; Tesung Kim (Iconic Sounds)	The Stereotypes; Clarence Coffee Jr.; Tesung Kim (Iconic Sounds)	3:45
6.	"White Noise" (白色噪音)	Seo Ji-eum; Liu Yuan	LDN Noise; Adrian McKinnon; Rodnae "Chikk" Bell	LDN Noise	3:32
7.	"One and Only" (玻璃鱼缸)	Park Seong-hee; Liu Yuan	Joseph "Joe Millionaire" Foster; Carl "Chip" Days Jr.	Otha "Vakseen" Davis III	3:49
8.	"They Never Know" (Chinese Version)	Jo Yoon-kyung; DeerJenny	MZMC; Jamil "Digi" Chammas; Adrian McKinnon; Jeremy "Tay" Jasper; Leven Kali; Otha "Vakseen" Davis III	MZMC; Jamil "Digi" Chammas	3:33
9.	"Stronger" (Sung by Lay, Baekhyun, Chen, D.O.)	Jung Joo-hee; Agnes Shin (MonoTree); Zhou Weijie	Andreas Öberg; Gustav Karlström; Lee Joo-hyoung (MonoTree)	Andreas Öberg; Gustav Karlström	3:39
10.	"Lucky One" (Instrumental)		Adrian McKinnon; Andrew Choi; LDN Noise	LDN Noise	3:47
11.	"Monster" (Instrumental)		Kenzie; LDN Noise; Rodnae "Chikk" Bell	Kenzie; LDN Noise; Rodnae "Chikk" Bell	3:47
Total length:					41:26

Lotto – Repackaged album (Korean version)
No.	Title	Lyrics	Music	Arrangement	Length
1.	"Lotto"	JQ (Makeumine Works); Seolim (Makeumine Works); Kim Min-ji; Jo Yoon-kyung	LDN Noise; Adrian McKinnon; Rodnae "Chikk" Bell	LDN Noise	3:09
2.	"Lucky One"	JQ (Makeumine Works); Seolim (Makeumine Works); Choi Jin-seon (Makeumine Works); Jang Yeo-jin	LDN Noise; Andrew Choi; Adrian McKinnon	LDN Noise	3:47
3.	"Monster"	Kenzie; Deepflow	Kenzie; LDN Noise; Rodnae "Chikk" Bell	Kenzie; LDN Noise; Rodnae "Chikk" Bell	3:41
4.	"Artificial Love"	JQ (Makeumine Works); Ji Ye-won (Makeumine Works); Seolim (Makeumine Works)	Timothy "BOS" Bullock; Adrian McKinnon; Jeremy "Tay" Jasper; MZMC	Timothy "BOS" Bullock	4:05
5.	"Can't Bring Me Down"	Young-hu Kim	Droyd; Adrian McKinnon; Jeremy "Tay" Jasper; Kameron "Grae" Alexander; Otha "Vaskeen" Davis III; MZMC	Droyd	3:06
6.	"Cloud 9"	Misfit	Dem Jointz; Ericka Coulter; Deez; Ryan S. Jhun	Dem Jointz; Ericka Coulter; Deez; Ryan S. Jhun	4:01
7.	"Heaven"	Chanyeol; Min Yeon-jae (lalala Studio)	The Stereotypes; Clarence Coffee Jr.; Tesung Kim (Iconic Sounds)	The Stereotypes; Clarence Coffee Jr.; Tesung Kim (Iconic Sounds)	3:45
8.	"She's Dreaming" (Korean: 꿈; RR: Kkum; lit. 'Dream') (Sung by Suho, Baekhyun, Chen, Chanyeol, D.O.)	Chen	Jay J. Kim; Erin Kim; Im Kwang-wook (Devine Channel)	Jay J. Kim; Erin Kim	4:06
9.	"White Noise" (백색소음; Baeksaek So-eum)	Seo Ji-eum	LDN Noise; Adrian McKinnon; Rodnae "Chikk" Bell	LDN Noise	3:32
10.	"One and Only" (유리어항; Yuri-eohang; lit. 'Glass fishbowl')	Park Seong-hee	Joseph "Joe Millionaire" Foster; Carl "Chip" Days Jr.; Otha "Vakseen" Davis III	Joseph "Joe Millionaire" Foster	3:49
11.	"They Never Know"	Jo Yoon-kyung	MZMC; Jamil "Digi" Chammas; Adrian McKinnon; Tay Jasper; Leven Kali; Otha "Vakseen" Davis III	MZMC; Jamil "Digi" Chammas	3:33
12.	"Stronger" (Sung by Suho, Baekhyun, Chen, D.O.)	Jung Joo-hee; Agnes Shin (MonoTree)	Andreas Öberg; Gustav Karlström; Lee Joo-hyoung (MonoTree)	Andreas Öberg; Gustav Karlström	3:39
13.	"Monster" (LDN Noise Creeper Bass Remix)	Kenzie; Deepflow	Kenzie; LDN Noise; Rodnae "Chikk" Bell	LDN Noise	4:05
Total length:					48:20

Lotto – Repackaged album (Chinese version)
No.	Title	Lyrics	Music	Arrangement	Length
1.	"Lotto" (Chinese Version)	JQ (Makeumine Works); Seolim (Makeumine Works); Kim Min-ji; Jo Yoon-kyung	LDN Noise; Adrian McKinnon; Rodnae "Chikk" Bell	LDN Noise	3:09
2.	"Lucky One" (Chinese Version)	JQ (Makeumine Works); Seolim (Makeumine Works); Choi Jin-seon (Makeumine Works); Jang Yeo-jin; Arys Chien	LDN Noise; Andrew Choi; Adrian McKinnon	LDN Noise	3:47
3.	"Monster" (Chinese Version)	Kenzie; Deepflow; Kevin Yi	Kenzie; LDN Noise; Rodnae "Chikk" Bell	Kenzie; LDN Noise; Rodnae "Chikk" Bell	3:41
4.	"Artificial Love" (Chinese Version)	JQ (Makeumine Works); Ji Ye-won (Makeumine Works); Seolim (Makeumine Works)	Timothy "BOS" Bullock; Adrian McKinnon; Jeremy "Tay" Jasper; MZMC	Timothy "BOS" Bullock	4:05
5.	"Can't Bring Me Down" (Chinese Version)	Young-hu Kim; Yang Yao Cheng	Droyd; Adrian McKinnon; Jeremy "Tay" Jasper; Kameron "Grae" Alexander; Otha "Vaskeen" Davis III; MZMC	Droyd	3:06
6.	"Cloud 9" (Chinese Version)	Misfit; Lin Xinye	Dem Jointz; Ericka Coulter; Deez; Ryan S. Jhun	Dem Jointz; Ericka Coulter; Deez; Ryan S. Jhun	4:01
7.	"Heaven" (Chinese Version)	Park Chanyeol; Min Yeon-jae (lalala Studio); DeerJenny	The Stereotypes; Clarence Coffee Jr.; Tesung Kim (Iconic Sounds)	The Stereotypes; Clarence Coffee Jr.; Tesung Kim (Iconic Sounds)	3:45
8.	"She's Dreaming (梦)" (Sung by Lay, Baekhyun, Chen, Chanyeol, D.O.)	Chen; Wang Yajun	Jay J. Kim; Erin Kim; Im Kwang-wook (Devine Channel)	Jay J. Kim; Erin Kim	4:06
9.	"White Noise (白色噪音)"	Seo Ji-eum; Liu Yuan	LDN Noise; Adrian McKinnon; Rodnae "Chikk" Bell	LDN Noise	3:32
10.	"One and Only (玻璃鱼缸)"	Park Seong-hee; Liu Yuan	Joseph "Joe Millionaire" Foster; Carl "Chip" Days Jr.; Otha "Vakseen" Davis III	Joseph "Joe Millionaire" Foster	3:49
11.	"They Never Know" (Chinese Version)	Jo Yoon-kyung; DeerJenny	MZMC; Jamil "Digi" Chammas; Adrian McKinnon; Jeremy "Tay" Jasper; Leven Kali; Otha "Vakseen" Davis III	MZMC; Jamil "Digi" Chammas	3:33
12.	"Stronger" (Sung by Lay, Baekhyun, Chen, D.O.)	Jung Joo-hee; Agnes Shin (MonoTree); Zhou Weijie	Andreas Öberg; Gustav Karlström; Lee Joo-hyoung (MonoTree)	Andreas Öberg; Gustav Karlström	3:39
13.	"Monster" (LDN Noise Creeper Bass Remix (Chinese ver.))	Kenzie; Deepflow; Kevin Yi	Kenzie; LDN Noise; Rodnae "Chikk" Bell	LDN Noise	4:05
Total length:					48:20

== Charts ==
Korean and Chinese versions

Chart	Peak position			
Chart	Ex'Act		Lotto	
Chart	Korean version	Chinese version	Korean version	Chinese version
French Digital Albums (SNEP)	165	—	—	—
Japanese Albums (Oricon)	8	16	—	—
South Korean Albums (Gaon)	1	2	1	2

Combined versions

Chart	Peak position
US World Albums (Billboard)	2

== Sales ==
Country	Sales			
Country	Ex'Act		Lotto	
Country	Korean version	Chinese version	Korean version	Chinese version
South Korea (Gaon)	551,750	248,325	244,502	120,238
Japan (Oricon)	24,679	7,210	—	—

== Release history ==
Release history for Ex'Act
Region	Date	Edition	Format	Label	Ref
South Korea	June 9, 2016	Ex'Act	CD; digital download; streaming	SM; KT	–
Various	June 9, 2016	Ex'Act	Digital download; streaming	SM	–
Taiwan	July 29, 2016	Ex'Act	CD	Avex Taiwan	
South Korea	August 18, 2016	Lotto	CD; digital download; streaming	SM; KT	–
Various	August 18, 2016	Lotto	Digital download; streaming	SM	–
Taiwan	September 30, 2016	Lotto	CD	Avex Taiwan	
