= Joseph Markell Foster =

Joe Millionaire
- Birth name: Joseph Markell Foster
- Born: Atlanta, Georgia, United States
- Occupation(s): Musician, composer

Joseph Markell Foster (born November 3, 1984), professionally known as Joe Millionaire (also Joe Milli) is an international record producer from Atlanta, Georgia, where he currently resides.

== Early life ==
Foster was born in southwest Atlanta, Georgia on November 3, 1984, to a musical family. He was introduced to a plethora of instruments early in his life. He attended Douglass High School where he began to explore software that allowed him to create the sounds that he grew to love and experiment with such as MPC, Fruity Loops, Logic, and Studio One.

Foster was offered a full music scholarship to Tennessee State University, where he was able to mold and develop his skill set.

== Career ==
While still an undergraduate, Foster was given the opportunity to produce for Lil' Wayne's music group, Squad Up. This led to Foster making his mark and working with names such as Trinidad James, Iggy Azelia, TI, T-Pain, YFN Lucci, and 2 Chains. He even ventured into television production, producing for shows such as Toddlers & Tiaras aired on TLC, WWE (Main Event / SmackDown) aired on the USA network and First aired on MTV.

After graduating from Traveca Nazarene University, Foster had the opportunity to produce on an EXO album that sold over a million copies, making him a Platinum-selling producer. Foster and Exo later collaborated on another project, which reached the #1 spot on Billboard's World Albums Chart.

Foster has established himself as a "one stop shop" for any artist or production. He knows how to play over 13 different instruments and has a basic knowledge of several different types of beat-making software.

== Notable works ==
Music Credits

| Artist | Year | Song | Album |
|---|---|---|---|
| Squad Up | 2006 | | |
| Starlito | 2006 | | |
| Frayser Boy | 2007 | | |
| Travis Porter | 2009 | Young Money Go Getta | |
| Gudda Gudda | 2010 | Murder | Guddaville |
| Kidd Kidd | 2011 | N.O Swag | Reallionaire |
| K Camp | 2011 2011 2012 | Kill Da Beat Go Girl Don't Shoot Me Down | Become A Fan Become A Fan Fan 4 Life |
| 8 Ball feat. Trinidad James | 2013 | No Room | Premo II |
| Yung Booke | 2013 | Free RIP | City on My Back |
| Kevin Gates | 2014 | Give 'em Hell | |
| Rich Kidz | 2014 | No | YARS |
| TI, Iggy Azalea, Spodee | 2014 | We Go Hard | G.D.O.D II |
| Trouble Trouble | 2014 | | |
| Jimmy 2Tymes, 2Chainz, Yung Joc | 2015 | Pocket Full of Stones | |
| TPain, OG Maco | 2015 | Wait A Minute | The Iron Way |
| EXO | 2016 | One And Only (유리어항) | Ex'Act |
| EXO | 2016 | Twenty Four | For Life |
| EXO | 2017 | Sweet Lies | The War: The Power of Music |
| EXO-CBX | 2016 | Rhythm After Summer | Hey Mama! |
| Money Bagg Yo | 2016 | WWYD | DWID |
| Red Velvet | 2016 | One of These Nights" (7월 7일; Joe Millionaire Version) | The Velvet |
| Super Junior | 2017 | Scene Stealer | PLAY |
| Taemin (SHINee) | 2017 | Thirsty | MOVE |
| YFN Lucci | 2017 | Never Interlude | Wish Me Well 2 |
| Eastside Jody feat Marlo | 2018 | F*ck Em All | Get Rich or Die Trapping |
| CHANYEOL & SEHUN (EXO) | 2018 | We Young | We Young - Single |
| Queen Key | 2018 | Miss 100K | Eat My Pu**y |
| Young Dro | 2018 | Tease | |
| Young Nudy | 2018 | Robbin & Gettin | Slimeball 3 |
| Tabias Tate | 2018 | Never | Karma of a Heartbreak |
| CIX | 2019 | My New world | HELLO Chapter 1: Hello, Stranger |

Television Credits

| Television Shows | Year |
|---|---|
| Toddlers & Tiaras aired on TLC Network | 2012 |
| WWE Smack Down aired on USA | 2012 |
| MTV First aired on MTV | 2012 |
| NBA TV Made | 2012 |
