= Lucky One (Exo song) =

2016 single by Exo

Single by Exo

from the album Ex'Act
- Language: Korean; Mandarin
- Released: June 9, 2016
- Recorded: 2016
- Studio: In Grid (Seoul); MonoTree (Seoul)
- Genre: K-pop; R&B; nu-disco
- Length: 3:47
- Label: SM; KT Music
- Composers: LDN Noise; Andrew Choi; Adrian McKinnon
- Lyricists: JQ; Seo-rim; Choi Jin-seon; Jang Yeo-jin; Arys Chien
- Producer: LDN Noise

EXO singles chronology
"Unfair" (2015)	"Lucky One" (2016)	"Monster" (2016)

Music video
- "Lucky One" (Korean Ver.) on YouTube "Lucky One" (Chinese Ver.) on YouTube

"Lucky One" is a song by South Korean–Chinese boy band Exo, released on June 9, 2016, as the first single from their third studio album Ex'Act. It was released in both Korean and Chinese versions by their label SM Entertainment.

== Background and release ==
"Lucky One" was produced by LDN Noise and tells the story of a man finding true love. It was inspired off of pop, R&B, and disco music.

== Music video ==
The Korean and Chinese music videos for "Lucky One" were released on June 9, 2016. The music video tells the story of Exo members suddenly losing their superpowers and get captured by other planet. While the nurses try to experiment on them, their powers awaken and they try to escape.

== Promotion ==
EXO began performing "Lucky One" on South Korean music television programs on June 9, 2016.

== Commercial performance ==
"Lucky One" peaked at number three on the Billboard World Digital Songs chart, number three on the Chinese Billboard Chart, and at five on the Gaon weekly digital chart.

== Track listing ==
Credits adapted from the album's liner notes.

=== Studio ===
- In Grid Studio – recording
- MonoTree Studio – recording, digital editing
- Doobdoob Studio – digital editing
- SM Blue Cup Studio – mixing
- Sterling Sound – mastering

=== Personnel ===
- Exo – vocals
  - Chen – background vocals
  - Chanyeol – background vocals
- LDN Noise – arrangement
- G-High – vocal directing, recording, Pro Tools operating, digital editing
- Kye Beom-ju – background vocals
- Jung Eui-seok – recording, mixing
- Jung Eun-kyung – recording
- Woo Min-jung – assistant recording
- Jang Woo-young – digital editing
- Tom Coyne – mastering

== Charts ==
=== Weekly charts ===
Chart (2016)	Peak position
China (Billboard)	3
Hong Kong (HKRIA)	19
South Korea (Gaon)	5
US World Digital Songs (Billboard)	3

=== Monthly charts ===
Chart (2016)	Peak position
South Korea (Gaon)	17

== Sales ==
Region	Sales
South Korea (Gaon)	433,399
United States (RIAA)	3,000+

== Release history ==
Release history for "Lucky One"
Region	Date	Format	Label
Various	June 9, 2016	Digital download; streaming	SM; KT Music
