= Lotto (song) =

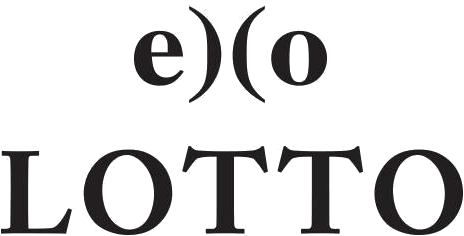
- Promotional logo

Single by Exo

from the album Lotto
- Language: Korean; Mandarin
- Released: August 18, 2016
- Recorded: 2016
- Studio: SM Yellow Tail (Seoul); InGrid (Seoul)
- Genre: K-pop; hip hop; R&B
- Length: 3:09
- Label: SM; Genie
- Composers: LDN Noise; Adrian McKinnon; Rodnae "Chikk" Bell
- Lyricists: JQ; Seolim; Jo Yoon-kyung; Kim Min-ji
- Producer: LDN Noise

Exo singles chronology
"Monster" (2016)	"Lotto" (2016)	"Dancing King" (2016)

Music video
- "Lotto" (Korean Ver.) on YouTube "Lotto" (Chinese Ver.) on YouTube

"Lotto" is a song by South Korean–Chinese boy band Exo, released on August 18, 2016, for the repackaged edition of their third studio album Lotto. Written by LDN Noise, Adrian McKinnon and Rodnae "Chikk" Bell, it was released in both Korean and Chinese versions by their label SM Entertainment.

== Background and release ==
Produced by LDN Noise, "Lotto" is described as "hip-hop" song enhanced by the heavy Auto-Tune with the lyrics about a man feeling so lucky, like he won the lottery after meeting the girl he loves. The song was released on August 18 together with the repackage album. Exo began performing the song on South Korean music TV shows on the following day.

== Music video ==
The Korean and Chinese music videos for "Lotto" were released on August 18, 2016, with choreography by Shit Kingz. The music video is described as "casino themed" and opens with the sound of a slot machine. Apart from Exo performing the song's high-powered choreography, it also shows scenes of the members gambling, watching cockfights, burning piles of money, and other risk-driven activities, before they and a female co-star are taken down by a S.W.A.T. team. The Korean version was the tenth most-watched K-pop music video on YouTube in 2016. On December 8, 2018, the Korean music video surpassed 100 million views on YouTube.

== Promotion ==
Exo began performing the song on South Korean music television programs on August 19. Member Kai was absent from promotional activities due to an injury he sustained during the concert tour. "Lotto" was deemed "unfit for broadcast" by KBS, MBC and Mnet, thus was promoted with modified lyrics under the alternative title "Louder" on these TV channels.

== Commercial performance ==
"Lotto" debuted at number two on the Gaon weekly digital chart and at number one on the Billboard World Digital Songs chart. The song went on to win first place seven times in total on South Korean weekly music television shows.

== Accolades ==
Music program awards
Program	Date
M Countdown	August 25, 2016
M Countdown	September 1, 2016
Music Bank	August 26, 2016
Music Bank	September 2, 2016
Inkigayo	August 28, 2016
Inkigayo	September 4, 2016
Show Champion	August 31, 2016

== Charts ==
=== Weekly charts ===
Chart (2016)	Peak position
South Korea (Gaon)	2
UK Indie Breakers (OCC)	16
US World Digital Songs (Billboard)	1

=== Monthly charts ===
Chart (2016)	Peak position
South Korea (Gaon)	14

== Sales ==
Region	Sales
South Korea (Gaon)	433,633
United States (Nielsen)	31,000

== Release history ==
Release history for "Lotto"
Region	Date	Format	Label
Various	August 18, 2016	Digital download; streaming	SM; Genie
