= Andrew Choi =

South Korean singer (born 1980)

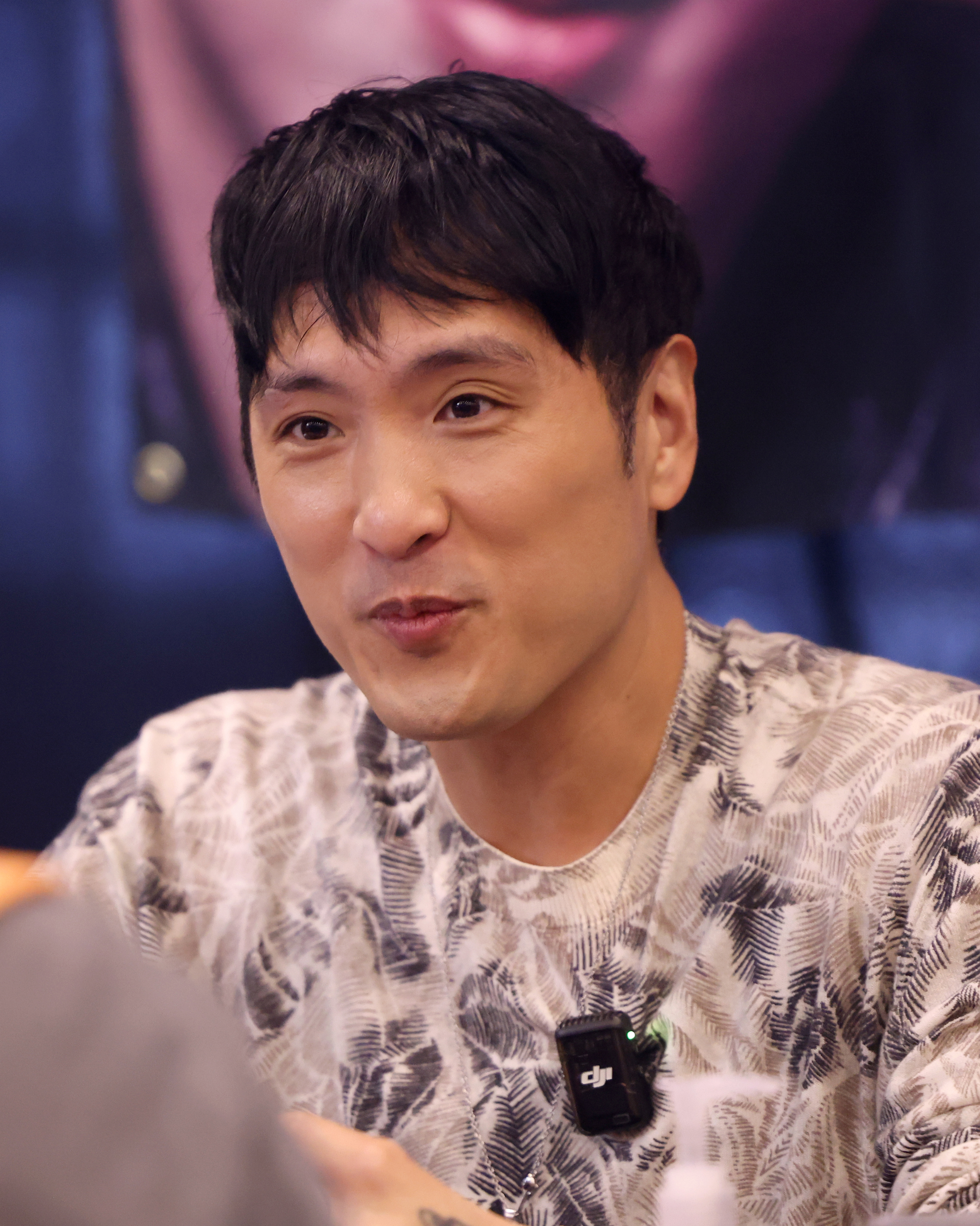
- Choi in 2026

Background information
- Born: Choi Seong-hyun; December 25, 1980 (age 45); Busan, South Korea
- Genres: K-pop, dance, R&B
- Occupations: Singer; composer
- Instrument: Vocals
- Labels: SM Entertainment; Iconic Sounds; Sony Music

Korean name
- Hangul: 최성현
- RR: Choe Seonghyeon
- MR: Ch'oe Sŏnghyŏn

Andrew Choi (born December 25, 1980), is a South Korean singer and composer. He is best known for providing the singing voice for the character Jinu in the Netflix animation, KPop Demon Hunters (2025). He was previously known for working as a producer and composer under SM Entertainment and for finishing in third place on SBS's K-pop Star 2.

He released his first album, Love Was Enough on May 27, 2013.

== Background ==
Choi was born in Busan on December 25, 1980, but grew up in the United States. He was five years old when his family moved to New Jersey. He wanted to enroll to a music school when he was younger but never had the opportunity, thus he pursued a musical career on his own. He majored in psychology at Rutgers University. He returned to Korea in 2009 and started working as an English teacher at a hagwon. He then joined Iconic Sounds and started composing music for other artists, before applying to K-pop Star 2.

He was brought on board the KPop Demon Hunters project by Ejae and originally asked to sing as Romance or Mystery but eventually became the singing voice for the main male character, Jinu.

October 2026, Choi officiated costar, Ejae and Samuel Kim's wedding in Seoul, Korea.

== Discography ==
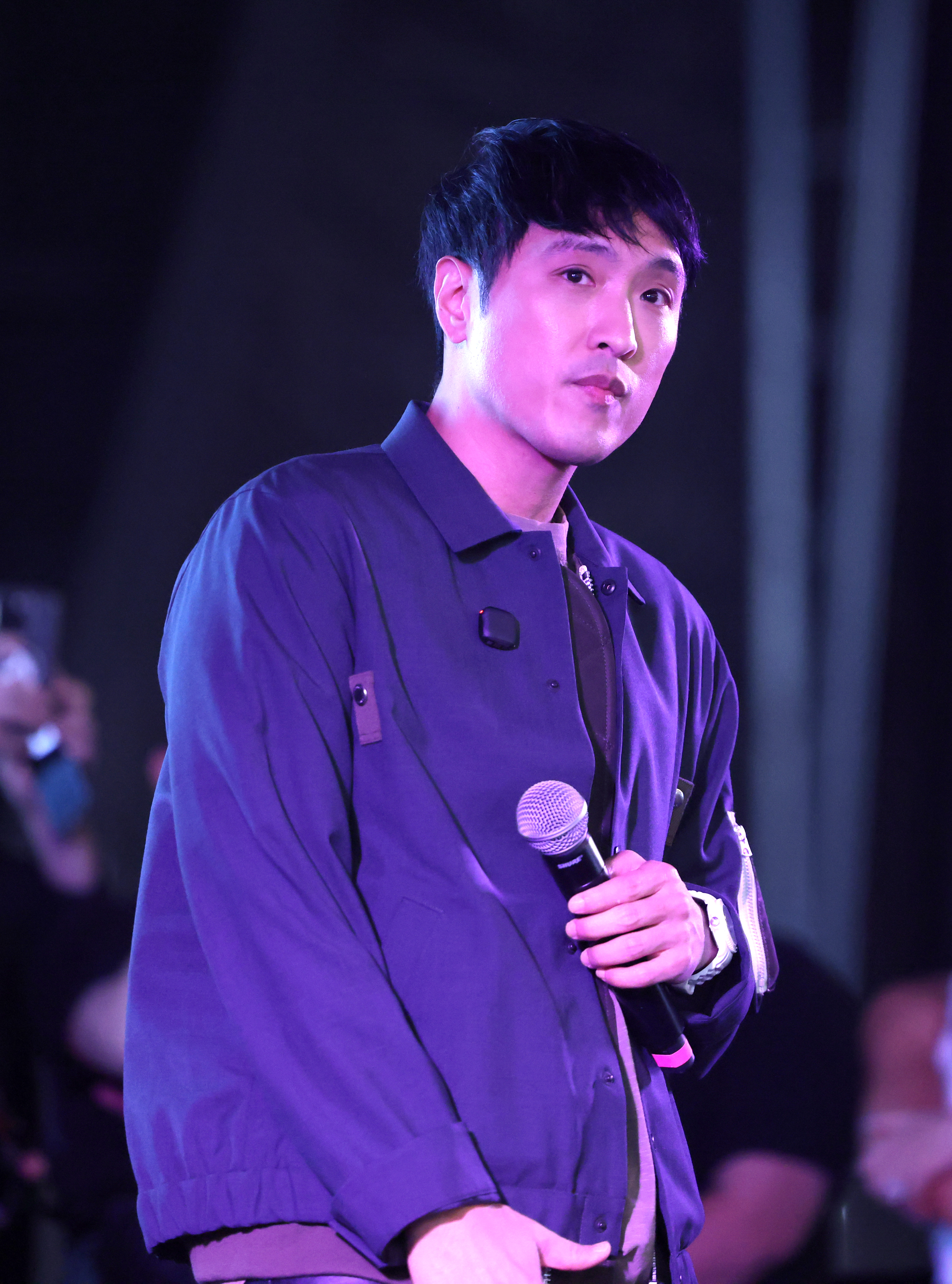
Choi performing at the 2026 Collect-A-Con in Scottsdale, Arizona.

=== Extended plays ===
Title	Details	Peak chart positions	Sales
Title	Details	KOR	Sales
Love Was Enough	Released: May 27, 2013; Label: Sony Music; Formats: CD, digital download, streaming; Track list: 1. "느금마"; 2. "Basketball team" 3. "멀리 있더라도 (Sending You My Love)"; 4. "Not Over Us"; 5. "If It Wasn't For You"	11	KOR: 1,145

=== Singles ===
Title	Year	Peak chart positions	Album
Title	Year	KOR	Album
"Love Was Enough"	2013	59	Love Was Enough
"Under My Skin"	2025	—	Non-album single
"Better With You"	2025	—	Non-album single
"—" denotes releases that did not chart or were not released in that region.

=== Promotional singles ===
Title	Year	Album
"행복을 크게 넓게 길게"	2013	Non-album single

=== Soundtrack appearances ===
Title	Year	Peak chart positions										Certifications	Album
Title	Year	KOR	AUS	CAN	MLY	NZ	PHL Hot	SGP	UK	US	WW	Certifications	Album
"Soda Pop" (with Neckwav, Danny Chung, Kevin Woo, and SamUIL Lee as Saja Boys)	2025	2	4	5	5	3	6	3	3	3	3	ARIA: 2× Platinum; BPI: Platinum; MC: 3× Platinum; RIAA: Platinum; RMNZ: Platinum	KPop Demon Hunters
"Free" (as Jinu, with Ejae as Rumi)	2025	26	13	21	6	9	10	7	— (Note: "Free" did not enter the Official Singles Chart, but peaked at number 21 on the Official Singles Sales and number 24 on the Streaming chart.)	23	11	ARIA: Platinum; BPI: Gold; MC: 2× Platinum; RMNZ: Platinum	KPop Demon Hunters
"Your Idol" (with Neckwav, Danny Chung, Kevin Woo, and SamUIL Lee as Saja Boys)	2025	6	4	8	3	4	14	4	5	4	3	ARIA: 2× Platinum; BPI: Platinum; MC: 2× Platinum; RIAA: Platinum; RMNZ: Platinum	KPop Demon Hunters
"—" denotes releases that did not chart or were not released in that region.

=== As producer / songwriter ===
All song credits are adapted from the Korea Music Copyright Association's database unless stated otherwise

Year	Artist	Song	Album
2011	BoA	"Distance"	2011 Winter SMTown: The Warmest Gift
2012	TVXQ	"Destiny"	Catch Me
2012	TVXQ	"Gorgeous"	Catch Me
2013	TVXQ	"I Know"	Time
2013	Rainbow	"In Love"	Rainbow Syndrome
2013	Shinee	"Beautiful"	Dream Girl – The Misconceptions of You
2013	Shinee	"Why So Serious?"	Why So Serious? – The Misconceptions of Me
2013	Shinee	"Shine" (Medusa I)	Why So Serious? – The Misconceptions of Me
2013	Shinee	"Dangerous" (Medusa II)	Why So Serious? – The Misconceptions of Me
2013	Exo	"Baby Don't Cry"	XOXO
2013	Exile	"No Limit"	Extreme Best
2014	Royal Pirates	"Drawing the Line"	Drawing the Line
2014	TVXQ	"Love Again"	Tense
2014	15&	"Sugar"	Sugar
2014	Exile Shokichi	"Enrai"	The Future
2014	History	"I Got U"	Desire
2014	History	"It's Alright"	Desire
2014	VIXX	"After Dark"	Error
2014	Super Junior	"Evanesce"	Mamacita
2015	Shinhwa	"White Shirts"	We
2015	Red Velvet	"Stupid Cupid"	Ice Cream Cake
2015	Hotshot	"Midnight Sun"	Am I Hotshot?
2015	Generations from Exile Tribe	"...for you"	Speedster
2015	Generations from Exile Tribe	"Pages"	Speedster
2015	2PM	"Hotter Than July"	No.5
2015	Day6	"이상하게 계속 이래" (Out Of My Mind)	The day
2015	NU'EST	"Koisuru Wonderland"	Bridge the World
2015	Exo	"On the Snow"	Sing for You
2016	Taemin	"Guess Who"	Press It
2016	Got7	"Something Good"	Flight Log: Departure
2016	Day6	"Blood"	Daydream
2016	VIXX	"Dynamite"	Zelos
2016	Dumbfounded	"Safe"	We Might Die
2016	U-Kiss	"Heartless"	Stalker
2016	Exo	"Lucky One"	Ex'Act
2016	Exo	"Winter Heat"	For Life
2016	Tiffany Young	"Heartbreak Hotel" (Tiffany and Simon Dominic)	SM Station Season 1
2016	Eric Nam	"Can't Help Myself" (못참겠어) (featuring Loco)	Non-album singles
2016	Jero	"Airplane" (못참겠어) (featuring Giriboy)	Airplane
2016	2PM	"Never"	Gentlemen's Game
2016	Song Ji-eun	"I Wanna Fall In Love"	Bobby Doll
2016	Kangta	"If I Told Ya"	'Home' Chapter 1
2017	Seohyun	"Hello" (featuring Eric Nam)	Don't Say No
2017	T-ara	"Real Love" (Eunjung solo)	What's My Name?
2017	NCT 127	"Whiplash"	Cherry Bomb
2017	Justin Park	"Dates In LA"	Non-album single
2017	VAV	"ABC (Middle Of The Night)"	Spotlight
2017	JJ Project	"Icarus"	Verse 2
2017	JJ Project	"Find You"	Verse 2
2017	JJ Project	"Fade Away" (Jay B solo)	Verse 2
2017	NCT Dream	"My Page"	We Young
2017	Kevin Oh	"Sorry"	Non-album single
2017	Day6	"Out of My Mind" (이상하게 계속 이래; Final Ver.)	Moonrise
2018	Rainz	"Open Ur Heart"	Shake You Up
2018	Suzy	"SObeR"	Faces of Love
2018	TVXQ	"Wake Me Up"	New Chapter #1: The Chance of Love
2018	Ten	"New Heroes"	SM Station Season 2
2018	Victon	"Celebrate"	Evergreen OST (Part 6)
2018	Leebada	"LOVE" (featuring pH-1)	Pink Ocean
2018	Leebada	"Runnin' Back"	Black Ocean
2018	NCT 127	"100"	Chain
2018	Shinee	"Chemistry"	The Story of Light
2018	Shinee	"Undercover"	The Story of Light
2018	UMB	"Black Heart"	Black Heart
2018	Jamie	"Count You Out"	jiminxjamie
2018	Chanyeol & Sehun	"We Young"	Station X 0
2018	T2U	"Ocean"	Ocean
2018	Babylon	"One More Night" (featuring Vinxen)	Caelo
2018	Exo-CBX	"Off the Wall"	Magic
2018	NCT	"Timeless"	NCT 2018 Empathy
2018	Taemin	"What's This Feeling"	Taemin
2018	Baek A-yeon	"Starlight"	Dear Me
2018	Yesung & Chung Ha	"Whatcha Doin'"	SM Station Season 3
2019	Bumkey	"Dancing on glass"	Non-album single
2019	Chanyeol	"SSWF"	SM Station Season 3
2019	WayV	"Say It"	Take Off
2019	Taemin	"It's You"	Famous
2019	U-Know	"Blue Jeans"	True Colors
2019	JeA	"My World"	Newself
2019	Ailee	"Midnight"	Butterfly
2019	Ailee	"Want it"	Butterfly
2019	Ailee	"Headlock"	Butterfly
2019	Weki Meki	"Tiki-Taka (99%)"	Week End LOL
2019	Monsta X	"Disaster"	Follow: Find You
2020	Ryuji Imaichi	"Kiss & Tell"	Zone of Gold
2020	Sechs Kies	"All for You"	All for You
2020	The Boyz	"Shake You Down"	Reveal
2020	The Boyz	"Christmassy!"	Non-album single
2020	Shuta Sueyoshi	"With Me"	Pret-a-Porter
2020	Pentagon	"Asteroid"	Universe: The Black Hall
2020	JO1	"Tsukame (It's Coming)"	Protostar
2020	NCT 127	"Make Your Day"	Neo Zone: The Final Round
2020	Bang Ye-Dam	"Wayo"	Non-album single
2020	DMTN	"Never Forget"	Non-album single
2020	Red Velvet – Irene & Seulgi	"Jelly"	Monster
2020	Taemin	"I Think It's Love"	Never Gonna Dance Again
2020	Jasmine Sokko	"Red Pill"	新乐园 / Made In Future
2021	Baekhyun	"Stars"	Baekhyun
2021	The Rampage from Exile Tribe	"Bad Luv"	Reboot
2021	Victon	"Chess"	Voice: The Future Is Now
2021	Shinee	"Heart Attack"	Don't Call Me
2021	Yuki	"Baby it's You"	Terminal
2021	WayV – Kun & Xiaojun	"Sleepless"	Back To You
2021	Twice	"Wonderful Day"	Doughnut
2022	SixTones	"Papercut"	City
2022	Deep Squad	"Hitorigoto"	Gimme Gimme
2022	Ryuji Imaichi	"Star Seeker"	Good Old Future
2023	Mirror	"Rumors"	Non-album single
2023	Shinee	"Hard"	Hard
2023	Exile Takahiro	"Canaria"	Explore
2023	The Rampage from Exile Tribe	"Sekai ga kawatte"	Katasumi
2023	Yim Si-wan & Winter	"Win for You"	Non-album single
2023	WayV	"Lighthouse"	On My Youth
2024	Bang Ye-Dam & Winter	"Officially Cool"	Non-album single
2024	The KingDom	"Flip that Coin"	Realize
2024	The KingDom	"Gundam"	Realize
2024	Artms	"Virtual Angel"	DALL
2024	Kim Jae Joong	"Good News"	Flower Garden
2024	NCT 127	"Orange Seoul"	Walk
2024	Zerobaseone	"Good So Bad"	Cinema Paradise
2024	Olivia Marsh	"42"	Meanwhile
2024	Project 7	"Psycho"	Project 7 Final
2025	Olivia Marsh	"Strategy"	Meanwhile
2025	Olivia Marsh	"Backseat"	Meanwhile
2025	Olivia Marsh	"Pina Colada"	Meanwhile
2025	SM Town	"Thank You"	2025 SM Town: The Culture, The Future
2025	Zerobaseone	"Blue"	Blue Paradise
2025	Zerobaseone	"Extra"	Never Say Never
2025	Zerobaseone	"Long Way Back"	Never Say Never
2025	Mark	"+82 Pressin'"	The Firstfruit
2025	NCT Wish	"Melt Inside My Pocket"	Poppop
2025	NCT Wish	"Color"	Color
2025	NCT Wish	"Cheat Code"	Color
2025	INI	"Potion"	The Origin
2025	Andrew Choi	"Under My Skin"	Non-album single
2025	Andrew Choi	"Better With You"	Non-album single
2025	Yook Sungjae	"Break Away"	All About Blue
2025	NCT Dream	"Chiller"	Go Back To The Future
2025	WayV	"Your Song"	Big Bands
2025	Park Bo-gum	"On My Way"	On My Way
2025	Idntt	"Storm"	<unevermet>
2025	8Turn	"Electric Heart"	Electric Heart: Born to Glow
2025	Haechan	"Adrenaline"	Taste
2025	Hearts2Hearts	"Flutter"	Focus
2026	Hearts2Hearts	"Lemon Tang"	Lemon Tang
2026	Shinee	"Atmos"	Atmos
2026	Shinee	"Thousand Miles Away"	Atmos
2026	Felix	"Slow It Down"	Non-album single

== Filmography ==
=== Film ===
Year	Title	Role
2025	KPop Demon Hunters	Jinu (singing voice)

=== Television ===
Year	Title	Role	Network	Notes/Ref.
2012–2013	Survival Audition K-pop Star Season 2	Contestant	SBS	3rd Place

== Accolades ==
=== Awards and nominations ===
Year	Award	Category	Work	Result	Ref.
2025	K-World Dream Awards	Best OST	"Soda Pop" (Note: with Neckwav, Danny Chung, Kevin Woo, SamUIL Lee as the Saja Boys)	Nominated	
2025	Korea Grand Music Awards	Best Virtual Artist	"Soda Pop"	Nominated	
2025	MAMA Awards	Best OST	"Soda Pop"	Nominated	
2026	Annie Awards	Outstanding Achievement for Music in a Feature Production	KPop Demon Hunters (Note: with KPop Demon Hunters Music Team.)	Won	
2026	Dorian Award	Film Music of the Year	KPop Demon Hunters	Nominated	
2026	Music Awards Japan	Best Anime Song	"Soda Pop"	Longlisted	
2026	Music Awards Japan	Best K-Pop Song in Japan	"Soda Pop"	Longlisted	
2026	Music Awards Japan	International Song powered by Spotify	"Soda Pop"	Nominated	

=== Listicles ===
Name of publisher, year listed, name of listicle, and placement
Publisher	Year	Listicle	Placement	Ref.
Billboard Korea	2025	K-Pop Artist 100	73rd	
Luminate	2025	Most Streamed K-Pop Artist in US	5th	
Luminate	2025	Most Streamed K-Pop Artist in US	4th	
