= Mama (Exo song) =

2012 single by Exo

- Exo-K's version (left) and Exo-M's version (right)

Single by Exo

from the EP Mama
- Language: Korean; Mandarin
- Released: April 8, 2012
- Recorded: 2011
- Studio: SM Booming System (Seoul)
- Genre: K-pop; rock; R&B
- Length: 4:32
- Label: SM; KMP Holdings
- Composer: Yoo Young-jin
- Lyricists: Yoo Young-jin; Wang Yajun
- Producer: Yoo Young-jin

Exo singles chronology
"History" (2012)	"Mama" (2012)	"Wolf" (2013)

Music video
- "Mama (Korean version)" on YouTube "Mama (Chinese version)" on YouTube

"Mama" is a song by South Korean boy band Exo, split to the two subgroups Exo-K and Exo-M. It served as their debut single and the title track of their debut extended play Mama (2012). Available in both Korean and Mandarin, the song was released digitally on April 8, 2012, by SM Entertainment.

== Release and promotion ==
"Mama" was originally written and produced by Yoo Young-jin, with the Chinese lyrics written by Wang Yajun. The Korean version is performed by subgroup Exo-K and the Mandarin version by Exo-M. The music videos of the song were released on YouTube on April 7, 2012, the same day the song was made available for download through iTunes and other Korean and mainland Chinese online retailers.

Exo-K and Exo-M performed both versions during their pre-debut showcase on March 31, 2012 in Seoul, South Korea, followed by a second group performance for their second showcase in Beijing, China on April 1.

On April 7, Exo-M made their television debut at China's 12th Yinyue Fengyun Bang Awards, performing "Mama". On that same day Exo-K made their debut in Korea on SBS's music program Inkigayo, performing both "Mama" and a prologue single, "History". Exo-K also debuted on Mnet's M Countdown on April 12, KBS's Music Bank on April 13, and MBC's Show! Music Core on April 14.

== Music video ==
Two music videos for "Mama" were released on YouTube on April 8, 2012 through S.M. Entertainment's official channel, SMTOWN. Each music video, though recorded in two different versions, featured all twelve members of Exo.

The two videos begin with the same animation and English voice over illustrating the birth of twelve legendary powers that break into two separate forces in order to "keep alive the heart of the tree of life," which is being conquered by an evil force. The two legends divide the tree of life in half, and carries each piece to their own lands. The narration then declares that the two legends will "reunite into one perfect root" on the day, the evil force purifies. After the introduction, all twelve members of Exo appear wearing robes as they walk to the center of a darkly lit circular room. The song begins with the members looking up to a bright light in the sky in unison. Throughout the videos, there are close-up shots of the members performing their own celestial powers with intercut sequences of choreographed dancing, choreographed by Lyle Beniga. Xiumin has cryokinesis (frost), Kris has flying, Luhan has telekinesis, Suho has water powers, Baekhyun has light powers, Lay has healing, Chen has lightning, Chanyeol has pyrokinesis, D.O. has strength and ground manipulation, Tao has time stopping, Kai has teleportation, and Sehun has wind. The videos end with each group finishing their dance, and they both close with the logo of Exo.

== Credits and personnel ==
Credits adapted from the EP's liner notes.

=== Studio ===
- SM Booming System – recording, mixing
- Sonic Korea – mastering

=== Personnel ===
- SM Entertainment – executive producer
- Lee Soo-man – producer
- Kim Young-min – executive supervisor
- Exo – vocals
- Yoo Young-jin – producer, Korean lyrics, composition, arrangement, vocal directing, background vocals, recording, mixing
- Wang Yajun – Chinese lyrics
- Koo Bon-soo – background vocals
- Kim Bum-jin – background vocals
- Kim Jung-hyun – background vocals
- Jeon Hoon – mastering

== Charts ==
Chart (2012)	Peak position
South Korea (Gaon)	46
South Korea (K-Pop Hot 100)	89

== Sales ==
Region	Sales
United States (Nielsen)	38,000

== Release history ==
Release dates and formats
Region	Date	Format(s)	Distributor
South Korea	April 18, 2012	Digital download; streaming	SM; KMP
Various	April 18, 2012	Digital download; streaming	SM
