= Mama (EP) =

2012 EP by Exo

- Exo-K's Korean version (left) and Exo-M's Chinese version (right)

EP by Exo
- Released: April 9, 2012
- Recorded: 2011
- Studios: InGrid (Seoul); SM Blue Cup (Seoul); SM Blue Ocean (Seoul); SM Booming System (Seoul)
- Genres: K-pop; Mandopop; R&B; hip-hop
- Length: 21:55
- Languages: Korean; Mandarin
- Label: SM
- Producers: Lee Soo-man; Yoo Young-jin; Hyuk Shin; Lee Yun-jae; Misfit; Albi Albertsson; Im Kwang-wook; Teddy Riley

Exo chronology
Mama (2012)	XOXO (2013)

Singles from Mama
- 1. "What Is Love" Released: January 30, 2012; 2. "History" Released: March 9, 2012; 3. "Mama" Released: April 8, 2012

Mama is the debut studio extended play (EP) by South Korean boy band Exo. It was released by SM Entertainment on April 9, 2012, in two language editions for each subgroup – Exo-K's Korean version and Exo-M's Mandarin version.

== Background ==
The EP was produced by Lee Soo-man, who is also the main producer for the group. The title for the EP is a Korean term used to address to a royal person, similar to the attributes "your highness" or "your majesty" in English. The title single "Mama" is written by Yoo Young-jin, who also co-wrote two other singles from the EP, "What Is Love" and "History".

== Promotion ==
Between December 2011 and February 2012, SM Entertainment released twenty-three teaser trailers featuring the members of the group, which included some previews of the songs from the EP. The track "Angel" is used as background music in four teaser trailers. The track "Two Moons" is featured in Teaser #12, which starred Exo-K's Kai and Exo-M's Lay. "Machine" is featured in Teaser #5, starring Kai. The track "What is Love" is featured in two teaser trailers.

Exo-K promoted the title track "Mama" on music shows, along with the track "History". They made their debut at music shows including SBS's Inkigayo, Mnet's M Countdown, KBS's Music Bank and MBC's Show! Music Core from April 8 to April 15, while Exo-M performed at China's 12th Yinyue Fengyun Bang Awards that same day. Exo-K promoted the album by performing "Mama" on Korean music shows every week. Exo-M supported the album by being billed as the supporting artist on the Indonesian leg of Super Junior's Super Show 4 concert tour, and made consistent appearances on Chinese televised music programs and variety shows, including a guest appearance on an episode of Happy Camp.

== Release and reception ==
The group's prologue single, "What Is Love" was released on January 30, 2012. A second prologue single, "History" was released on March 9.

On March 31, 2012, SM Entertainment unveiled a teaser trailer for the music video of the EP's title single, "Mama" at Exo's concert showcase in Seoul, South Korea. On April 6, the company released the album jacket photos for both of Exo-K and Exo-M's albums. The EP was released on April 9, 2012, simultaneously in China, South Korea, and the international iTunes Store.

Both versions of the EP were a commercial success; Exo-K's version reached to number one on South Korea's Gaon Album Chart, number four on China's Sina Album Chart, and debuted at number eight on the Billboard World Albums Chart. Exo-M's version reached to number one on China's Sina Album Chart, number four on the Gaon Album Chart, and number twelve on the Billboard World Albums Chart. All three singles by Exo-M were charted in various Chinese music and video charts, with the EP's title single topping the charts after one day of release. The music videos for all three singles peaked at number one on Chinese streaming websites, while Exo-K's "Mama" reached number seven on YouTube's Global Chart.

== Singles ==
=== "What is Love" ===
"What is Love" was released for digital download from the iTunes Store and other Korean and mainland Chinese online retailers on January 30, 2012. The Korean version is performed by D.O. and Baekhyun of subgroup Exo-K and the Mandarin version by Chen and Lu Han of Exo-M. The two music videos of the song were released on YouTube on the same day the song was made available for download. Each music video, though recorded in two different versions, featured all twelve members of Exo. The music videos consist of the combined video teasers that were previously released by the company.

=== "History" ===
"History" was digitally released on March 9, 2012, in both Korean and Mandarin. The Korean version is performed by subgroup Exo-K and the Mandarin version by Exo-M. The music videos of the song were released on YouTube on March 8, 2012, one day before the song was made available for download through iTunes and other Korean and mainland Chinese online retailers. Both music videos featured all twelve members of Exo dancing in a windy, rocky setting and a bright blue studio.

"History" debuted at number 27 on China's Sina New Singles Chart and ultimately reached to number six. On the Sina Hot Singles Chart, the song debuted at number 64 and peaked at number 14. In South Korea, "History" peaked at number 86.

== Track listing ==
Credits adapted from Naver

Korean version (by Exo-K)
No.	Title	Lyrics	Music	Arrangement	Length
1.	"Mama"	Yoo Young-jin	Yoo Young-jin	Yoo Young-jin	4:31
2.	"What Is Love" (sung by: Baekhyun, D.O.)	Yoo Young-jin	Yoo Young-jin; Teddy Riley; Dominique "DOM" Rodriguez (Audity); Richard Garcia (Audity)	Teddy Riley	4:22
3.	"History"	Yoo Young-jin	Thomas Troelsen; Mikkel Sigvardt	Yoo Young-jin; Thomas Troelsen; Mikkel Sigvardt	3:32
4.	"Angel" (너의 세상으로; Neoui sesangeuro; 'Into your world') (sung by: Baekhyun, D.O., Suho)	Jo Yoon-kyung	Hyuk Shin (Joombas); DK (Joombas); Sasha Hamilton	Hyuk Shin (Joombas); Sasha Hamilton	3:01
5.	"Two Moons" (두 개의 달이 뜨는 밤; Du gaeui dari tteuneun bam; 'Two moons floating tonight') (sung by: Kai, Chanyeol, Sehun, Key of SHINee)	Misfit	Albi Albertsson (Musasshi); Im Kwang-wook (Devine Channel)	Albi Albertsson (Musasshi); Im Kwang-wook (Devine Channel)	3:03
6.	"Machine"	Misfit	Albi Albertsson (Musasshi); Timo Kaukolampi	Albi Albertsson (Musasshi); Timo Kaukolampi	3:26
Total length:					21:55

Chinese version (by Exo-M)
No.	Title	Lyrics	Music	Arrangement	Length
1.	"Mama"	Wang Yajun	Yoo Young-jin	Yoo Young-jin	4:31
2.	"What Is Love (爱就是什么?)" (sung by: Chen, Luhan)	Han Killn	Yoo Young-jin; Teddy Riley; Dominique "DOM" Rodriguez (Audity); Richard Garcia (Audity)	Teddy Riley	4:22
3.	"History (历史)"	Liu Yuan	Thomas Troelsen; Mikkel Sigvardt	Yoo Young-jin; Thomas Troelsen; Mikkel Sigvardt	3:32
4.	"Angel" (你的世界; Nǐ De Shìjiè) (sung by: Chen, Luhan, Lay, Xiumin) (Trans:"Your World")	Liu Yuan	Hyuk Shin (Joombas); DK (Joombas); Sasha Hamilton	Hyuk Shin (Joombas); Sasha Hamilton	3:01
5.	"Two Moons" (双月之夜; Shuāng Yuè Zhī Yè) (sung by: Kris, Tao, Lay, Xiumin, Key of SHINee) (Trans:"Night of Two Moons")	T-Crash; Misfit	Albi Albertsson (Musasshi); Im Kwang-wook (Devine Channel)	Albi Albertsson (Musasshi); Im Kwang-wook (Devine Channel)	3:03
6.	"Machine (机械)"	Zhou Weijie	Albi Albertsson (Musasshi); Timo Kaukolampi	Albi Albertsson (Musasshi); Timo Kaukolampi	3:26
Total length:					21:55

== Charts ==
Chart	Peak position	
Chart	MAMA (Kor ver.)	MAMA (Chn ver.)
South Korea Gaon Weekly Albums Chart	1	4
South Korea Gaon Monthly Albums Chart	1	6
South Korea Gaon 2012 Yearly Albums Chart	7	16
South Korea Gaon 2013 Yearly Albums Chart	32	39
South Korea Gaon 2014 Yearly Albums Chart	39	54
South Korea Gaon 2015 Yearly Albums Chart	95	—
Japan Oricon Weekly Albums Chart	33	63
US (Billboard World Albums Chart)	8	12

== Sales ==
Chart	Sales
Japan (Oricon)	10,485+ (Chinese version)
Japan (Oricon)	35,771+ (Korean version)
South Korea (Gaon)	207,072+ (Chinese version)
South Korea (Gaon)	294,486+ (Korean version)

== Awards and nominations ==
Year	Award	Nominated work	Category	Result
2012	SBS PopAsia Awards	History	Music Video of the Year	Won
2013	Golden Disk Awards	Mama	Disk Bonsang	Nominated

== Release history ==
Release history for Mama
Region	Date	Format	Label
South Korea	April 9, 2012	CD; digital download; streaming	SM; KMP
Various	April 9, 2012	Digital download; streaming	SM
China	August 1, 2012	CD	SM; Guandong Yinxiang
Thailand	May 30, 2013	CD	SM True
