= Kenzie (songwriter) =

South Korean songwriter and record producer (born 1976)

- Born: Kim Yeon-jung; February 3, 1976 (age 50)
- Origin: South Korea
- Genres: K-pop; R&B; electropop; hip hop
- Occupations: Songwriter; record producer
- Years active: 2002–present
- Label: SM

- Korean name
- Hangul: 김연정
- RR: Gim Yeonjeong
- MR: Kim Yŏnjŏng

Kim Yeon-jung (Korean: 김연정; born February 3, 1976), known professionally as Kenzie (켄지), is a South Korean songwriter and record producer signed under SM Entertainment. She has written and produced songs for SM artists such as BoA, Isak N Jiyeon, Super Junior, The Grace, TVXQ, Girls' Generation, Shinee, f(x), Exo, Red Velvet, SuperM, Aespa, NCT, Riize and Hearts2Hearts, as well as non-SM artists such as Twice, CIX, BAE173, The Boyz, Zerobaseone and TWS.

== Biography ==
Kim is a 1999 Alumna of Berklee College of Music, having majored in music production and engineering (MP&E). She moved to the US to further her studies, though her goal was still to be a music producer and composer in her native country of South Korea. Although she had been trained in classical music and knew how to play the piano and trumpet, she acquainted herself with the pop scene, and through the knowledge of the success of S.M. Entertainment groups like S.E.S. and H.O.T., she set herself a goal to work with S.M., which she accomplished after graduating and meeting the CEO Lee Soo-man himself.

Her favourite songs amongst her own work include BoA's "My Name", Girls' Generation's debut song "Into The New World", and "Oh!" by the same group, as well as f(x)'s debut song "LA chA tA".

In 2018, she was also in charge of arranging the debut song for n.CH Entertainment's girl group Nature, titled "Allegro Cantabile". It was a remake of the anime opening title song "Nodame Cantabile".
