= List of The Show Chart winners (2026) =

The Show Chart winners (2026)

The Show Chart is a music program record chart on SBS Life that gives an award to the best-performing single of the week in South Korea. On June 2, 2026, The Show returned with a new season and revised format, following a hiatus since November 2025. Since July 2026, the show has been hosted by Flare U's Chuei Liyu and Xikers's Minjae.

== Scoring system ==
Period covered	Chart system				
Period covered	Digital sales	Physical album	SNS	Pre-voting	Live voting
June 2, 2026 – present	40%	20%	20%	20%	20%

== Chart history ==
Key
	Indicates a Triple Crown
	Highest score of the year
—	No show was held

Episode	Date	Artist	Song	Points	Ref.
394	June 2	And2ble	"Curious"	11,670	
—N/a	June 9	No Broadcast or Winner			
—N/a	June 16	No Broadcast or Winner			
—N/a	June 23	No Broadcast or Winner			
—N/a	June 30	No Broadcast or Winner			
—N/a	July 7	No Broadcast or Winner			
395	July 14	Rescene	"Pretty Girl"	10,000	
—N/a	July 21	No Broadcast or Winner			
396	July 28	Idntt	"Kids Return"	8,524	
—N/a	August 4	No Broadcast or Winner			
397	August 11	Kiss of Life	"Sweat"	8,868	
—N/a	August 18	No Broadcast or Winner			
—N/a	August 25	No Broadcast or Winner			
398	September 1	Alpha Drive One	"Born Dire"	12,000	
—N/a	September 8	No Broadcast or Winner			
399	September 15	Evan	"Death of Me"	12,000	
—N/a	September 22	No Broadcast or Winner			
—N/a	September 29	No Broadcast or Winner			
400	October 6	Cravity	"Louder"	9,800	
—N/a	October 13	No Broadcast or Winner			
401	October 20	A2O Lite	"Neon"	7,331	
—N/a	October 27	No Broadcast or Winner			
402	November 3	And2ble	"French Kissing"	11,005	
403	November 10	Rescene	"With"	8,379	
404	November 17	A2O Soul	"Dancing in the Dark"	11,660	

== See also ==
- List of Inkigayo Chart winners (2026)
- List of M Countdown Chart winners (2026)
- List of Music Bank Chart winners (2026)
- List of Show Champion Chart winners (2026)
- List of Show K-Pop Chart winners (2026)
- List of Show! Music Core Chart winners (2026)
