= List of Show Champion Chart winners (2026) =

Show Champion Chart winners (2026)

The Show Champion Chart is a record chart on the South Korean MBC M television music program Show Champion. Every week, the show awards the best performing single on the chart in the country during its live broadcast. The show has been hosted by Nam Seong-mo of 82Major, Jeon Min-wook and Jang Yeo-jun of Close Your Eyes since May 2025.

== Scoring system ==
Period covered	Chart system				
Period covered	Digital sales	Physical album	Music video	Broadcast	Voting
July 14, 2021 – present	35%	15%	10%	20%	20%
Data Sources: Melon, Bugs!, Genie Music, and Flo (Digital sales); Hanteo (Physical album); YouTube (Music video); Idol Champ (Voting)

== Chart history ==
Key
†	Indicates a Triple Crown
	Indicates the highest score of the year
—	No show was held

Episode	Date	Artist	Song	Points	Ref.
—N/a	January 7	No Broadcast or Winner			
—N/a	January 14	No Broadcast or Winner			
583	January 21	Alpha Drive One	"Freak Alarm"	9,498	
584	January 28	Exo	"Crown"	7,698	
585	February 4	KiiiKiii	"404 (New Era)"	7,131	
586	February 11	Ateez	"Adrenaline"	5,658	
—N/a	February 18	No Broadcast or Winner			
—N/a	February 25	No Broadcast or Winner			
587	March 4	Ive	"Blackhole"	5,716	
588	March 11	Blackpink	"Go"	6,907	
589	March 18	P1Harmony	"Unique"	6,553	
590	March 25	BTS	"Swim" †	8,000	
591	April 1	BTS	"Swim" †	7,955	
592	April 8	BTS	"Swim" †	7,825	
593	April 15	KickFlip	"Eye-Poppin'"	6,351	
594	April 22	Tomorrow X Together	"Stick with You"	6,102	
595	April 29	&Team	"We on Fire" (Korean version)	4,918	
596	May 6	Nexz	"Mmchk"	7,762	
597	May 13	Cortis	"RedRed"	7,160	
—N/a	May 20	No Broadcast or Winner			
598	May 27	Zerobaseone	"Top 5"	5,357	
599	June 3	And2ble	"Curious"	5,957	
600	June 10	TripleS	"Baby Flower"	5,727	
—N/a	June 17	No Broadcast or Winner			
601	June 24	Riize	"Do Your Dance"	5,264	
—N/a	July 1	No Broadcast or Winner			
602	July 8	Hearts2Hearts	"Lemon Tang"	6,280	
603	July 15	AHOF	"Run to You"	5,293	
604	July 22	Idntt	"Kids Return"	6,750	
605	July 29	Fromis 9	"Vitamin Me"	7,939	
606	August 5	Nouera	".exe"	6,138	
607	August 12	Red Velvet	"Surfin' Boy"	5,645	
608	August 19	Stray Kids	"This & That"	6,183	
609	August 26	Enhypen	"Bloody Paradise"	5,221	
610	September 2	Alpha Drive One	"Born Dire"	6,998	
611	September 9	82Major	"Like Fire"	6,040	
612	September 16	Evan	"Death of Me"	5,898	
—N/a	September 23	No Broadcast or Winner			
—N/a	September 30	No Broadcast or Winner			
613	October 7	NiziU	"Sour Grapes"	5,444	
614	October 14	KickFlip	"Kick Off the Wall"	4,612	
615	October 21	A2O Lite	"Neon"	6,317	
616	October 28	A2O Lite	"Neon"	3,917	
617	November 4	And2ble	"French Kissing"	6,159	
618	November 11	Rescene	"With"	7,303	
619	November 18	NCT Dream	"Boogie Woogie"	5,314	

== See also ==
- List of Inkigayo Chart winners (2026)
- List of M Countdown Chart winners (2026)
- List of Music Bank Chart winners (2026)
- List of Show K-Pop Chart winners (2026)
- List of Show! Music Core Chart winners (2026)
- List of The Show Chart winners (2026)
