= List of Inkigayo Chart winners (2026) =

Inkigayo Chart winners (2026)

The Inkigayo Chart is a music program record chart on Seoul Broadcasting System (SBS) that gives an award to the best-performing single of the week in South Korea. The show aired every Sunday at 3:20 p.m. KST and was broadcast from the SBS Open Hall in Deungchon-dong, Gangseo-gu, Seoul. Every week, the show awards the best-performing single on the chart in the country during its live broadcast. The show has been hosted by EJ, Shinyu, and Yihyun since the beginning of 2026.

== Scoring system ==
Period covered	Chart system					Ref.
Period covered	Digital sales	On-Air	Physical album	Video views	Voting	Ref.
October 6, 2024 – present	50%	10%	10%	20%	10% (5% pre-vote + 5% live-vote)	
Data Sources: Melon, Genie Music, Flo, and Circle Global K-pop Chart (Digital sales); Circle Album Chart (Physical album); YouTube (Music video); SBS TV & Radio (On-Air); LiNC (Pre-voting); Higher (Live-voting)

== Chart history ==
Key
†	Indicates a Triple Crown
	Indicates the highest score of the year
—	No show was held

Chart history
Episode	Date	Artist	Song	Points	Ref.
—N/a	January 4	No show, winner not announced			
1,294	January 11	Hwasa	"Good Goodbye" † (Note: "Good Goodbye" ranked number one for one week in 2025.)	7,249	
1,295	January 18	Hwasa	"Good Goodbye" †	6,045	
1,296	January 25	Alpha Drive One	"Freak Alarm"	5,023	
1,297	February 1	Exo	"Crown"	5,238	
1,298	February 8	I-dle	"Mono"	4,570	
1,299	February 15	Ateez	"Adrenaline"	4,764	
—N/a	February 22	No show, winner not announced			
1,300	March 1	Ive	"Bang Bang"	8,345	
1,301	March 8	Ive	"Bang Bang"	6,612	
1,302	March 15	Blackpink	"Go"	5,935	
1,303	March 22	Hearts2Hearts	"Rude!"	5,769	
1,304	March 29	BTS	"Swim" †	7,245	
1,305	April 5	BTS	"Swim" †	9,422	
1,306	April 12	BTS	"Swim" †	8,590	
1,307	April 19	BTS	"2.0"	4,701	
1,308	April 26	Tomorrow X Together	"Stick with You"	5,727	
1,309	May 3	NCT Wish	"Ode to Love"	5,456	
1,310	May 10	TWS	"You, You"	4,743	
1,311	May 17	Cortis	"RedRed" †	5,926	
1,312	May 24	Cortis	"RedRed" †	5,904	
1,313	May 31	Cortis	"RedRed" †	6,415	
1,314	June 7	Illit	"It's Me" †	5,939	
1,315	June 14	Illit	"It's Me" †	5,168	
1,316	June 21	Illit	"It's Me" †	5,099	
1,317	June 28	Riize	"Do Your Dance"	5,036	
—N/a	July 5	No show, winner not announced			
1,318	July 12	I.O.I	"Suddenly"	5,343	
1,319	July 19	I.O.I	"Suddenly"	4,856	
1,320	July 26	Rescene	"Love Attack"	5,486	
—N/a	August 2	No show, winner not announced			
—N/a	August 9	No show, winner not announced			
1,321	August 16	Rescene	"Love Attack"	4,699	
1,322	August 23	Stray Kids	"This & That"	4,790	
1,323	August 30	Enhypen	"Bloody Paradise"	4,815	
1,324	September 6	BigBang	"Biiig"	5,351	
1,325	September 13	Ateez	"Bad"	5,800	
1,326	September 20	Ateez	"Bad"	4,657	
—N/a	September 27	No show, winner not announced			
1,327	October 4	Soyeon	"I'm Gonna Toesa"	6,406	
1,328	October 11	Soyeon	"I'm Gonna Toesa"	5,366	
—N/a	October 18	No show, winner not announced			
1,329	October 25	A2O Lite	"Neon" †	6,060	
1,330	November 1	A2O Lite	"Neon" †	6,576	
1,331	November 8	A2O Lite	"Neon" †	6,037	
1,332	November 15	Rescene	"With"	7,361	
1,333	November 22	Rescene	"With"	5,221	

== See also ==
- List of M Countdown Chart winners (2026)
- List of Music Bank Chart winners (2026)
- List of Show Champion Chart winners (2026)
- List of Show K-Pop Chart winners (2026)
- List of Show! Music Core Chart winners (2026)
- List of The Show Chart winners (2026)
