= List of Show! Music Core Chart winners (2026) =

Show! Music Core Chart winners (2026)

The Show! Music Core Chart is a record chart on the South Korean MBC television music program Show! Music Core. Every week, the show awards the best-performing single on the chart in the country during its live broadcast. Since March 1, 2025, the show has been hosted by Hearts2Hearts' A-na, TWS' Dohoon, and And2ble's Kim Gyu-vin. A-na left in May 2, 2026.

== Scoring system ==
Period covered	Chart system							Ref.
Period covered	Digital sales	Physical album	Music video	Broadcast	Viewer committee	Pre-voting	Live voting	Ref.
June 5, 2021 – May 23, 2026	50%	10%	10%	10%	5%	5%	10%	
May 30, 2026 – present	50%	10%	10%	5%	5%	10%	10%	
Data Sources: Circle Digital Chart (Digital sales); Circle Album Chart (Physical album); YouTube (Music video); MBC TV & Radio (Broadcast); Mubeat & Muniverse (Voting)

== Chart history ==
Key
†	Indicates a Triple Crown
	Highest score in 2026
—	No show was held

Episode	Date	Artist	Song	Points	Ref.
—N/a	January 3	No show, winner not announced			
930	January 10	Fromis 9	"White Memories"	6,822	
931	January 17	Illit	"Not Cute Anymore"	6,395	
932	January 24	Alpha Drive One	"Freak Alarm"	7,192	
933	January 31	Exo	"Crown"	8,721	
934	February 7	KiiiKiii	"404 (New Era)"	8,396	
935	February 14	Ateez	"Adrenaline"	8,835	
—N/a	February 21	No show, winner not announced			
936	February 28	Ive	"Bang Bang"	7,103	
937	March 7	Ive	"Bang Bang"	7,205	
938	March 14	Hearts2Hearts	"Rude!"	7,514	
939	March 21	Hearts2Hearts	"Rude!"	7,336	
—N/a	March 28	No show, winner not announced			
940	April 4	BTS	"Swim" †	9,494	
941	April 11	BTS	"Swim" †	8,532	
942	April 18	BTS	"Swim" †	5,723	
943	April 25	Tomorrow X Together	"Stick with You"	8,303	
944	May 2	NCT Wish	"Ode to Love"	6,333	
945	May 9	AKMU	"Paradise of Rumors"	5,753	
946	May 16	Cortis	"RedRed" †	6,830	
947	May 23	Cortis	"RedRed" †	7,055	
948	May 30	Cortis	"RedRed" †	7,000	
949	June 6	Illit	"It's Me"	7,072	
950	June 13	I.O.I	"Suddenly" †	7,815	
951	June 20	Special episode, winner not announced			
952	June 27	I.O.I	"Suddenly" †	6,637	
953	July 4	I.O.I	"Suddenly" †	7,518	
954	July 11	Aespa	"Lemonade"	7,086	
955	July 18	Yeonjun	"Ice Cream"	7,125	
956	July 25	Rescene	"Pretty Girl" †	6,772	
957	August 1	Fromis 9	"Vitamin Me"	9,223	
958	August 8	Rescene	"Pretty Girl" †	7,518	
959	August 15	Rescene	"Pretty Girl" †	7,046	
960	August 22	Ateez	"Bad"	7,322	
961	August 29	Enhypen	"Bloody Paradise"	7,834	
962	September 5	NCT 127	"Blingy"	8,741	
963	September 12	Taemin	"Float"	8,098	
964	September 19	Lim Young-woong	"ToTo"	7,485	
—N/a	September 26	No show, winner not announced			
—N/a	October 3	No show, winner not announced			
965	October 10	Soyeon	"I'm Gonna Toesa"	6,670	
966	October 17	Onew & Zico	"Tic Tac Toe"	7,054	
967	October 24	Plave	"Star Trace"	8,299	
968	October 31	A2O Lite	"Neon"	6,557	
969	November 7	A2O Lite	"Neon"	6,593	
970	November 14	Rescene	"With"	8,473	
971	November 21	NCT Dream	"Boogie Woogie"	7,254	

== See also ==
- List of Inkigayo Chart winners (2026)
- List of M Countdown Chart winners (2026)
- List of Music Bank Chart winners (2026)
- List of Show Champion Chart winners (2026)
- List of Show K-Pop Chart winners (2026)
- List of The Show Chart winners (2026)
