= List of M Countdown Chart winners (2026) =

M Countdown Chart winners (2026)

The M Countdown Chart is a record chart on the South Korean Mnet television music program M Countdown. Every week, the show awards the best-performing single on the chart in the country during its live broadcast. Since March 12, 2026, the show has been hosted by Park Gun-wook, So Jung-hwan and Kye-hoon.

== Scoring system ==
Period covered	Chart system				
Period covered	Broadcast	Digital sales	Physical album	Video views	Voting
January 5, 2024 – present	10%	50%	15%	10%	20% (10% pre-vote + 10% live-vote)
Data Sources: Circle Global K-pop Chart (Digital sales); Circle Album Chart (Physical album); TikTok and YouTube (Video views); Mnet (Broadcast); Mnet Plus (Voting)

== Chart history ==
Key
†	Indicates a Triple Crown
	Indicates the highest score of the year
—	No show was held

Episode	Date	Artist	Song	Points	Ref.
—N/a	January 1	No Broadcast or Winner			
911	January 8	AllDay Project	"Look at Me"	6,970	
912	January 15	Apink	"Love Me More"	7,567	
913	January 22	Enhypen	"Knife"	9,408	
914	January 29	Exo	"Crown"	8,406	
915	February 5	I-dle	"Mono"	7,693	
916	February 12	KiiiKiii	"404 (New Era)"	6,450	
—N/a	February 19	No Broadcast or Winner			
917	February 26	Ive	"Bang Bang"	7,985	
918	March 5	Hearts2Hearts	"Rude!"	9,389	
919	March 12	Blackpink	"Go"	8,294	
920	March 19	Hearts2Hearts	"Rude!"	8,136	
921	March 26	BTS	"Swim" †	10,167	
922	April 2	BTS	"Swim" †	10,150	
923	April 9	BTS	"Swim" †	10,052	
924	April 16	Kiss of Life	"Who Is She"	8,884	
925	April 23	Tomorrow X Together	"Stick with You"	10,700	
926	April 30	Cortis	"RedRed" †	8,902	
927	May 7	Cortis	"RedRed" †	—N/a	
928	May 14	Cortis	"RedRed" †	10,160	
929	May 21	Nmixx	"Heavy Serenade"	8,167	
930	May 28	Zerobaseone	"Top 5"	6,650	
931	June 4	Le Sserafim	"Boompala"	—N/a	
932	June 11	Treasure	"If I"	6,328	
933	June 18	Aespa	"Lemonade"	6,263	
934	June 25	Le Sserafim, Illit and Katseye	"Iconic by Mistake"	6,654	
935	July 2	Hearts2Hearts	"Lemon Tang"	6,431	
936	July 9	Le Sserafim, Illit and Katseye	"Iconic by Mistake"	6,876	
937	July 16	Ateez	"Bad"	—N/a	
938	July 23	Ateez	"Bad"	6,754	
939	July 30	Jennie	"Less Than a Lover"	7,712	
940	August 6	Jennie	"Less Than a Lover"	7,253	
941	August 13	Stray Kids	"This & That"	—N/a	
942	August 20	Stray Kids	"This & That"	10,286	
943	August 27	Enhypen	"Bloody Paradise" †	8,172	
944	September 3	Enhypen	"Bloody Paradise" †	7,822	
945	September 10	Enhypen	"Bloody Paradise" †	7,866	
946	September 17	Jisoo	"Click"	—N/a	
—N/a	September 24	No Broadcast or Winner			
947	October 1	Soyeon	"I'm Gonna Toesa"	7,621	
948	October 8	BoyNextDoor	"Animal"	6,453	
949	October 15	KickFlip	"Kick Off the Wall"	5,502	
950	October 22	A2O Lite	"Neon"	6,866	
—N/a	October 29	No Broadcast or Winner			
—N/a	November 5	No Broadcast or Winner			
—N/a	November 12	No Broadcast or Winner			
—N/a	November 19	No Broadcast or Winner			
—N/a	November 26	No Broadcast or Winner			
—N/a	December 3	No Broadcast or Winner			
—N/a	December 10	No Broadcast or Winner			
—N/a	December 17	No Broadcast or Winner			
—N/a	December 24	No Broadcast or Winner			
—N/a	December 31	No Broadcast or Winner			

== See also ==
- List of Inkigayo Chart winners (2026)
- List of Music Bank Chart winners (2026)
- List of Show Champion Chart winners (2026)
- List of Show K-Pop Chart winners (2026)
- List of Show! Music Core Chart winners (2026)
- List of The Show Chart winners (2026)
