= List of Music Bank Chart winners (2026) =

Music Bank Chart winners (2026)

The Music Bank Chart is a record chart established in 1998 on the South Korean KBS television music program Music Bank. Every week during its live broadcast, the show gives an award for the best-performing single on the South Korean chart. The show had been hosted by Park Min-ju and Moon Sang-min since October 2024, until they left on January 30, 2026. Since February 27, 2026, the show has been hosted by Bang Jee-min and Kim Jae-won.

== Scoring system ==
Period covered	Chart system					Ref.
Period covered	Digital sales	Physical album	Broadcast	Voting	Social media	Ref.
February 25, 2022 – present	60%	5%	20%	10%	5%	
Data Sources: Melon, Bugs!, Genie Music, Naver VIBE and Flo (Digital sales); Circle (Physical album & social media); Fancast (Voting)

== Chart history ==
Key
	Highest score of the year
—	No show was held

Episode	Date	Artist	Song	Points	Ref.
—N/a	January 2	Nmixx	"Blue Valentine"	3,918	
1,275	January 9	Say My Name	"UFO (Attention)"	11,912	
1,276	January 16	Idntt	"Pretty Boy Swag"	10,600	
1,277	January 23	Alpha Drive One	"Freak Alarm"	10,559	
1,278	January 30	Exo	"Crown"	9,431	
1,279	February 6	I-dle	"Mono"	5,886	
1,280	February 13	Ateez	"Adrenaline"	14,413	
—N/a	February 20	Ateez	"Adrenaline"	10,307	
1,281	February 27	Ive	"Bang Bang"	7,695	
1,282	March 6	Ive	"Bang Bang"	8,840	
1,283	March 13	Ive	"Bang Bang"	4,405	
1,284	March 20	P1Harmony	"Unique"	10,034	
1,285	March 27	BTS	"Swim"	10,703	
1,286	April 3	BTS	"Swim"	9,477	
1,287	April 10	Irene	"Biggest Fan"	7,062	
1,288	April 17	KickFlip	"Eye-Poppin'"	8,974	
1,289	April 24	Tomorrow X Together	"Stick with You"	10,515	
1,290	May 1	NCT Wish	"Ode to Love"	11,578	
1,291	May 8	TWS	"You, You"	9,538	
1,292	May 15	Cortis	"RedRed"	12,244	
1,293	May 22	Nmixx	"Heavy Serenade"	9,582	
1,294	May 29	Taeyong	"WYLD"	6,586	
1,295	June 5	Aespa	"WDA (Whole Different Animal)"	6,934	
1,296	June 12	TripleS	"Baby Flower"	7,990	
—N/a	June 19	BoyNextDoor	"Viral"	14,877	
—N/a	June 26	Riize	"Do Your Dance"	15,059	
1,297	July 3	Ateez	"Bad"	9,688	
1,298	July 10	Ateez	"Bad"	7,271	
1,299	July 17	Yeonjun	"Ice Cream"	6,920	
1,300	July 24	Idntt	"Kids Return"	9,182	
1,301	July 31	Fromis 9	"Vitamin Me"	9,302	
1,302	August 7	Nouera	".exe"	8,827	
1,303	August 14	Stray Kids	"This & That"	12,799	
1,304	August 21	Stray Kids	"This & That"	7,436	
1,305	August 28	Enhypen	"Bloody Paradise"	12,817	
1,306	September 4	Alpha Drive One	"Born Dire"	8,794	
1,307	September 11	Monsta X	"Magic"	5,045	
1,308	September 18	&Team	"Mark on Me"	8,458	
—N/a	September 25	Young Tak	"Gogo"	7,959	
—N/a	October 2	Cortis	"RedRed"	5,315	
1,309	October 9	Close Your Eyes	"Drop That!"	9,020	
1,310	October 16	KickFlip	"Puzzle Piece"	8,990	
1,311	October 23	NCT Wish	"I Spy"	8,352	
1,312	October 30	Nmixx	"Birthday Wish"	7,775	
1,313	November 6	Illit	"You're Under Arrest"	9,803	
1,314	November 13	TWS	"Call My Name"	9,857	
1,315	November 20	NCT Dream	"Boogie Woogie"	7,239	

== See also ==
- List of Inkigayo Chart winners (2026)
- List of M Countdown Chart winners (2026)
- List of Show Champion Chart winners (2026)
- List of Show K-Pop Chart winners (2026)
- List of Show! Music Core Chart winners (2026)
- List of The Show Chart winners (2026)
