= Go (Blackpink song) =

Single by Blackpink

from the EP Deadline
- Released: February 27, 2026
- Studio: The Black Label (Seoul)
- Genre: EDM; techno
- Length: 3:15
- Label: YG
- Songwriters: Chris Martin; Henry Walter; Rosé; Danny Chung; Jisoo; Jennie; Lisa
- Producers: Cirkut; Teddy

Blackpink singles chronology
"Jump" (2025)	"Go" (2026)

Music video
- "Go" on YouTube

"Go" is a song by South Korean girl group Blackpink. It was released through YG Entertainment on February 27, 2026, as the second single from the group's third Korean extended play Deadline (2026). An EDM and techno track, it is the first by Blackpink to be written by all four members, with additional songwriting credits to Chris Martin, Danny Chung, and Cirkut and production by the latter with Teddy.

"Go" received positive reviews from critics, many of whom considered it the EP's highlight. The song peaked at number ten on South Korea's Circle Digital Chart, becoming the second top-ten hit from Deadline following "Jump". It topped the charts in Taiwan and Vietnam and entered the top ten in Malaysia, Hong Kong, Saudi Arabia, Singapore, MENA, and Thailand. It also peaked at number 17 on the Billboard Global 200, number 44 on the UK Singles Chart, and number 63 on the US Billboard Hot 100. An accompanying music video was directed by Rima Yoon and released on Blackpink's YouTube channel simultaneously with the single's release.

== Background and release ==
Following the release of "Jump" in July 2025, YG Entertainment's founder Yang Hyun-suk confirmed in August that the group was in the process of working on a new extended play. On October 20, the label confirmed that Blackpink would begin filming the music video for their new song that week and that the EP was in its "final stages" of preparations to ensure the highest musical quality. On January 14, 2026, Blackpink officially announced their third Korean EP Deadline, due for release on February 27. The EP's tracklist was revealed on February 5, including "Go" as the second single and lead track. The song and its music video were released concurrently with the EP on February 27.

== Lyrics and composition ==
"Go" marked the first time all four members of Blackpink have written on one song together. The song was written by them with Chris Martin, Cirkut, and Danny Chung, and produced by Cirkut and Teddy. It is an "anthemic, EDM-laced" and techno track with a "sludgy dubstep" beat drop featuring a "whirlpool of grinding, turbo-charged synths." Lyrically, the song is a confidence anthem featuring Blackpink's signature swagger. Lisa sings "here to the rescue, I'm number one," in the first verse and raps "Never gonna settle for second, I need a gold medal" in the second, suggesting that they deserve a position at the top of the music industry. In the bridge, Blackpink delivers a pep talk to encourage any of their fans struggling to find love to take opportunities that come by, saying: "When your heart is broken, baby / Darkness on the edge of town / Try to keep it open, baby." The group's chant of "Blackpink'll make ya" conveys a message of courage and solidarity and encapsulates the group's confident energy.

The song is written in the key of D minor in common time, and features a tempo of 103 beats per minute.

== Critical reception ==
Writing for Billboard, Jeff Benjamin ranked "Go" as the best song on the EP and a representation of Blackpink's duality with its combination of an "undeniable hard edge" as well as an "obvious softness". He commended the beat drop as "one of Blackpink's most innovative breakdowns ever" and the "Blackpink'll make ya... GO" hook as something listeners will be "screaming along to by the song's end". Likewise, Alex Ramos of Pitchfork lauded "Go" as the EP's highlight and "characteristically Blackpink, familiar in stature while introducing a new sound into their body of work." He noted how it demands dancing with its "booming bass and serrated edges" while also evoking softness through the acoustic guitars on the bridge, similar to the "freedom and vulnerability" of Blackpink's song "Lovesick Girls" (2020). Clash's Robin Murray characterized the song as "taut and aggressive" and a "feisty stadium-filling demand", while Rolling Stone's Rob Sheffield described it as a "splashier, more aggressive party banger" featuring a "rousing moment where Born Pink meets Born to Run, from deep in the emotional badlands" in the bridge.

== Accolades ==
On South Korean music programs, "Go" won three first-place trophies.

Awards and nominations
Year	Organization	Award	Result	Ref.
2026	BreakTudo Awards	International Music Video	Pending	
2026	KM Chart Awards	Best Popular Song Award	Nominated	

Music program awards
Program	Date	Ref.
Inkigayo	March 15, 2026	
Show Champion	March 11, 2026	
M Countdown	March 12, 2026	

== Music video ==
A music video teaser for "Go" was released on February 23, 2026. The accompanying music video was directed by Rima Yoon and released on February 27 alongside the release of Deadline. The intergalactic sci-fi themed video mixes nautical, human anatomical and elemental themes, alternately showing Blackpink practicing on a ballet barre in all-black outfits, holding rowing paddles, and them strapped into sleep pods on a space ship. During the chorus, imagery is shown of a silver pod spinning in a void and masked rowers propelling a sleek racing shell through the void. Praised as their magnum opus increasing the bar for K-pop visuals, the video replaces Blackpink's neon pink palette with a liquid silver aesthetic as they wear "sleek, avant-garde outfits" set against celestial landscapes. Shifts of light between "harsh, strobe-like flashes to a soft, ethereal glow" create the effect of "dreamlike abstractions", while the members embody the theme of four interstellar sailors charting their own path as they revolve around their own axis. A pivotal scene shows the group holding crossed oars in a tight formation, a symbol of the power of their solidarity even in the midst of the chaos around them.

== Credits and personnel ==
Credits are adapted from Billboard, Apple Music and the liner notes of Deadline.

Recording

- Recorded at The Black Label Studio (Seoul)

Personnel

- Blackpink – vocals
  - Rosé – songwriter
  - Jisoo – songwriter
  - Jennie – songwriter
  - Lisa – songwriter
- Chris Martin – songwriter, piano, acoustic guitar, keyboards, background vocals
- Cirkut – songwriter, producer, keyboards
- Danny Chung – songwriter
- Teddy – producer, vocal producer
- Bella Corich – background vocals, additional engineering
- Denise Carite – background vocals
- Shaneka Hamilton – background vocals
- Stevie Mackey – background vocals
- Serban Ghenea – mixing
- Chris Gehringer – mastering
- Tate McDowell – engineering, additional production
- Bill Rahko – engineering, additional production
- Gun Yin – engineering
- Carl Bang – engineering
- Robert Palma – engineering

== Charts ==
=== Weekly charts ===
Weekly chart performance
Chart (2026)	Peak position
Austria (Ö3 Austria Top 40)	66
Bolivia Anglo Airplay (Monitor Latino)	11
Canada Hot 100 (Billboard)	50
Canada CHR/Top 40 (Billboard)	37
Central America Anglo Airplay (Monitor Latino)	11
Chile Anglo Airplay (Monitor Latino)	7
China (TME Korean)	2
Costa Rica Anglo Airplay (Monitor Latino)	10
Dominican Republic Anglo Airplay (Monitor Latino)	15
Ecuador Anglo Airplay (Monitor Latino)	10
El Salvador Anglo Airplay (Monitor Latino)	3
France (SNEP)	65
Germany (GfK)	64
Global 200 (Billboard)	17
Greece International (IFPI)	16
Guatemala Anglo Airplay (Monitor Latino)	6
Hong Kong (Billboard)	3
Ireland (IRMA)	69
Japan Hot 100 (Billboard)	42
Lithuania (AGATA)	72
Malaysia (IFPI)	2
Middle East and North Africa (IFPI)	4
Netherlands (Single Top 100)	86
New Zealand Hot Singles (RMNZ)	7
Nicaragua Anglo Airplay (Monitor Latino)	3
Panama Anglo Airplay (Monitor Latino)	14
Paraguay Airplay (Monitor Latino)	14
Philippines Hot 100 (Billboard Philippines)	32
Poland (Polish Streaming Top 100)	75
Portugal (AFP)	77
Saudi Arabia (IFPI)	3
Singapore (RIAS)	3
Slovakia Singles Digital (ČNS IFPI)	43
South Korea (Circle)	10
Sweden Heatseeker (Sverigetopplistan)	6
Switzerland (Schweizer Hitparade)	67
Taiwan (Billboard)	1
Thailand (IFPI)	5
United Arab Emirates (IFPI)	13
UK Singles (Official Charts)	44
UK Independent (Official Charts)	11
US Billboard Hot 100	63
US Pop Airplay (Billboard)	32
Vietnam (IFPI)	1

=== Monthly charts ===
Monthly chart performance
Chart (2026)	Position
Paraguay Airplay (SGP)	31
South Korea (Circle)	19

Note: In Australia, the EP Deadline ranked at number 30 on the singles chart, but the single was not recognised separately.

== Release history ==
Release dates and formats
Region	Date	Format	Label	Ref.
Various	February 27, 2026	Digital download; streaming	YG	
United States	March 3, 2026	Contemporary hit radio	YG; The Orchard	
Italy	March 6, 2026	Radio airplay	Sony; The Orchard	

== See also ==
- List of Inkigayo Chart winners (2026)
- List of K-pop songs on the Billboard charts
- List of M Countdown Chart winners (2026)
- List of Official Vietnam Chart number-one songs of 2026
- List of Show Champion Chart winners (2026)
