= Re:Scene =

- Digital cover

Single album by Rescene
- Released: March 26, 2024
- Length: 6:53
- Language: Korean
- Label: The Muze; Kakao

Singles from Re:Scene
- 1. "Yoyo" Released: February 29, 2024; 2. "Uhuh" Released: March 26, 2024

Re:Scene is the debut single album by South Korean girl group Rescene. It was released by The Muze Entertainment on March 26, 2024, and contains the pre-release single "Yoyo" and the lead single "Uhuh".

== Background and release ==
On February 8, 2024, The Muze Entertainment announced that it would be debuting a new girl group in March 2024. On February 15, it was announced that the group would be called Rescene. On February 24, it was announced that "Yoyo" would be pre-release on February 29. Five days later, "Yoyo" was released alongside its music video. On March 13, the track listing was released with "Uhuh" announced as the lead single. On March 23, the music video teaser for "Uhuh" was released. The single album was released alongside the music video for "Uhuh" on March 26.

== Promotion ==
Prior to the release of Re:Scene, on March 26, 2024, Rescene held a live showcase aimed at introducing the single album and its songs.

== Track listing ==
Track listing for Re:Scene
No.	Title	Lyrics	Music	Arrangement	Length
1.	"Yoyo"	Seo Jeong-ah; The Muze; Val Del Prete	Seo Ji-eun; Val Del Prete; Moon Kim	Seo Ji-eun	3:30
2.	"Uhuh"	The Muze; Paulina "Pau" Cerrilla; Josefin Glenmark	Paulina "Pau" Cerrilla; Josefin Glenmark; Daniel Roughley; Tim Tan; Jar (153/Joombas); The Muze	Daniel Roughley; Tim Tan; The Muze	3:23
Total length:					6:53

== Credits and personnel ==
Credits adapted from Melon.

Studio

- Doobdoob Studio – recording (all tracks)
- The Muze Studio – recording (track 1)
- Vibe Music Studio 606 – recording (track 2)
- Koko Sound – mixing (all tracks)
- 821 Sound – mastering (track 2)

Personnel

- Rescene – vocals (all tracks)
  - Minami – background vocals (track 1)
  - May – background vocals (track 1)
- The Muze – background vocals (track 1), lyrics (all tracks), composition (track 2), arrangement (track 2), recording (track 1), vocal directing (all tracks)
- Val Del Prete – background vocals, lyrics, composition (track 1)
- Lee Joo-heon – background vocals (track 1), vocal directing (all tracks)
- Perrie – background vocals (track 2)
- Paulina "Pau" Cerrilla – background vocals, lyrics, composition (track 2)
- Josefin Glenmark – background vocals, lyrics, composition (track 2)
- Seo Jeong-ah – lyrics (track 1)
- Seo Ji-eun – composition, arrangement, bass, synth, drums (track 1)
- Moon Kim – composition (track 1)
- Daniel Roughley – composition, arrangement, synth, drum programming (track 2)
- Tim Tan – composition, arrangement, synth, drum programming (track 2)
- Jar (153/Joombas) – composition (track 2)
- Jang Woo-young – recording (all tracks)
- Hwang Se-young – recording (track 1)
- Lee Kang-hyun – recording (track 2)
- Go Hyun-jung – mixing (all tracks)
- Kwon Nam-woo – mastering track 2)

== Charts ==
=== Weekly charts ===
Weekly chart performance for Re:Scene
Chart (2024)	Peak position
South Korean Albums (Circle)	15

=== Monthly charts ===
Monthly chart performance for Re:Scene
Chart (2024)	Position
South Korean Albums (Circle)	35

== Release history ==
Release history for Re:Scene
Region	Date	Format	Label
South Korea	March 27, 2024	CD	The Muze; Kakao
Various	March 27, 2024	Digital download; streaming	The Muze; Kakao
