= Reverxe =

- Digital cover

Studio album by Exo
- Released: January 19, 2026
- Recorded: 2025
- Studios: SM Aube (Seoul); SM Azure (Seoul); SM Big Shot (Seoul); SM Dorii (Seoul); SM Droplet (Seoul); SM Wavelet (Seoul); SM Yellow Tail (Seoul)
- Genre: K-pop
- Length: 27:44
- Languages: Korean; English
- Labels: SM; Kakao
- Producers: Kyle Buckley (Pink Slip); Ronny Svendsen; Pizzapunk; Leowi; Ian Jeffrey Thomas; Mike Robbins; SB90; Gingerbread; Rasmus Budny; DMV & Ras

Exo chronology
Exist (2023)	Reverxe (2026)

Singles from Reverxe
- 1. "Crown" Released: January 19, 2026

Reverxe is the eighth studio album by the South Korean-Chinese boy band Exo, released on January 19, 2026 by SM Entertainment. The album contains nine tracks, including the lead single "Crown". It reached number one on the Circle Album Chart and became the group's eighth album to sell over a million copies.

The album's production and promotional cycle were marked by a legal dispute between SM and members Xiumin, Baekhyun, and Chen (collectively known as Exo-CBX) regarding revenue sharing and contract transparency. While the trio expressed a desire to participate in group activities, SM Entertainment announced that the album would proceed with a six-member lineup—consisting of Suho, Lay, Chanyeol, D.O., Kai, Sehun—citing a breakdown of trust and unresolved contractual obligations.

== Background and release ==
Following the release of Exo's seventh studio album Exist in July 2023, the members focused on solo projects and the completion of mandatory military service for Kai and Sehun. The production of the album was influenced by a long-running legal dispute between SM Entertainment and members Chen, Baekhyun, and Xiumin (Exo-CBX) over revenue-sharing and settlement data, which ultimately led to several court dismissals of the trio's claims and investigations by the Fair Trade Commission finding no wrongdoing by the agency. Citing a "destruction of trust" from the litigation, SM excluded Exo-CBX from the project, which instead features Suho, Chanyeol, D.O., Kai, Sehun, and Lay, the latter returning for his first major group release since 2018.

On September 8, 2025, SM released a teaser image through Exo's official social media accounts featuring a lunar eclipse–like visual set in outer space and the text "December 2025", indicating a potential future release or group activity. The image referenced Exo's fictional narrative, which has been part of the group's concept since their debut in 2012, through the phrase "When We Become True One, a New World Awakens". The announcement took place shortly before the military discharge of the group's final enlisting member, Sehun, after which Exo was expected to resume collective promotions and fan-related activities.

On December 8, 2025, SM released a cinematic trailer through Exo's official YouTube channel, signaling the beginning of the promotional rollout for the album. In the video, the members, except Kai, are depicted struggling to believe in their own supernatural powers, blurring the line between reality and dreams. Despite this, they are mysteriously drawn back to the symbolic "Tree of Life", a recurring motif in Exo's original universe storyline. The trailer concluded with the reveal of the studio album's title, Reverxe. The album title is a stylized variation of the word "reverse", intended to signal a continuation of the group's debut concept. Scheduled for release in the first quarter of 2026, the album was preceded by a fan meeting titled "Exo'verse" held on December 14, 2025, at the Inspire Arena. During this event, the group would performed their 2013 song "The First Snow" alongside the first public preview of a new track from the upcoming album. Four days later, SM Entertainment announced the release of "I'm Home", a b-side track from Exo's eighth studio album. The song follows the group's established history of winter-themed releases, such as "Miracles in December" (2013), "Sing for You" (2015), "For Life" (2016), and "Universe" (2017). The music video was released on the same day of the fan meeting coinciding with the song's live debut. The performance was made available to global audiences through livestreams on Beyond Live and Weverse. On December 15, SM announced the details of the album, which included the release date to be on January 19, 2026, along with physical and digital formats. The album consists of nine tracks and marks the group's first full-length release in 30 months since Exist (2023). A new logo image was revealed through Exo's official social media accounts, and pre-orders opened the same day. A comeback showcase was held on the same day of the album's release at the Kyung Hee University Grand Peace Hall in Dongdaemun District, Seoul. Ahead of the album release, Exo appeared at the 2025 Melon Music Awards, marking their first appearance at the ceremony in eight years. During the broadcast, they premiered the performance of "Back It Up", a dance track included on the album, and performed several songs from their previous discography.

On January 5, 2026, "Crown" was revealed as the title track for the album. On January 18, the music video teaser for "Crown" was released. The next day, Exo released the album and the title track's music video.

== Promotion ==
In late 2025, prior to Exo's fan meeting on December 14, SM announced that Lay would not be taking part in group activities due to "unavoidable circumstances", resulting in the album being promoted as five members. Exo initiated a multi-channel promotional campaign for their eighth studio album, Reverxe. The campaign utilized various guerrilla marketing tactics throughout Seoul, including the distribution of business cards featuring encrypted codes near the Gocheok Sky Dome and the SM Entertainment headquarters, as well as the appearance of individuals in black cloaks branded with the album logo in districts such as Gangnam, Seongsu, and Hongdae. Digital engagement further supported the launch through short-form video content and an interactive "mystery quiz" released on their X account on December 29, which integrated the album's fictional narrative with social media participation.

Exo held a pop-up store titled "Reverxe the World" at The Hyundai Seoul from January 20 to 27, 2026. The installation was themed after the group's "Exo Universe" concept, featuring a maze-like layout and a "Cube" installation intended to visualize the members' fictional supernatural powers. The venue included displays of album versions, props from the "Crown" music video, interactive zones for producing stickers and photo cards, and a retail area for merchandise. Entry was managed through online and on-site reservations, with the first session of each day reserved for members of the official fan club, Exo-L.

The group also partnered with QQ Music to host a series of pop-up events across 13 cities in China. Originally planned for eight locations, the events were expanded to five additional cities due to high demand. According to SM Entertainment, the month-long promotion attracted over 600,000 visitors. During the tour, members of Exo held autograph and photo sessions in major hubs, including Shanghai, Beijing, and Shenzhen.

== Composition ==
Reverxe consists of nine tracks that span multiple genres, including the lead single "Crown", the winter-themed track "I'm Home", and the performance-oriented "Back It Up". The title track, "Crown", is characterized as a hard dance song that incorporates elements of Atlanta trap drumming, heavy metal guitar, and EDM synthesizers. The production utilizes siren sound effects and builds tension through the group's vocal delivery. Lyrically, "Crown" employs the titular object as a metaphor for a precious entity, focusing on themes of commitment and protection. The album's supporting tracks incorporate various genre influences. "Moonlight Shadows" is an R&B pop song featuring layered synth textures and electronic pulses. The track "Crazy" is a dance song built on an 808 bassline that combines electronic pop with Brazilian funk elements, utilizing tempo changes intended to reflect the lyrical theme of emotional obsession. "Suffocate" is a dance song characterized by synth pads and a dry kick-and-bass arrangement, with lyrics focused on the experience of a breakup. "Back Pocket" is a mid-tempo R&B track featuring guitar riffs and a funky bassline. The lyrics describe an attraction and the desire to be near another person. "Touch & Go" is a pop song characterized by a minimal arrangement of arpeggio synths, vocal chops, and a drum loop. It compares the experience of falling in love to the falling of dominoes. "Flatline" is a mid-tempo pop-rock song that incorporates acoustic guitar and synth sounds. The lyrics utilize a maritime metaphor, comparing life to sailing and a partner to a navigational landmark.

== Critical reception ==
Professional ratings
Review scores
Source	Rating
NME	4/5 stars

Prior to its release, Forbes and NME listed Reverxe as one of the most anticipated albums of 2026. Following its release, NME's Crystal Bell described Exo as "album-oriented artists" and noting that the record solidified their artistic identity while exploring "new possibilities". Writing for Tmrw Magazine, Hasan Beyaz described the lead single "Crown" as a "declaration" of the group's maturity that connects their "legacy and longevity" to a new chapter. Robin Murray of British magazine Clash characterized the release as a "comeback blockbuster", highlighting both the musical content and the personal narratives shared by the members during the album's promotional showcase.

== Commercial performance ==
Upon its release, Reverxe debuted at number one on the Hanteo Daily Album Chart, selling 265,934 copies and recording 362,921.22 points on the physical record index. By the end of its first week of availability (January 19–25), the album reached number one on the Hanteo Weekly Physical Album Chart with 907,976 copies sold, totaling 1.16 million points. The album's first-week sales were 41.89% lower than those of the group's 2023 album, Exist, which sold 1.56 million copies in its first week. First-day sales also saw a decrease from the 1,074,914 copies recorded by Exist. Media outlets noted that the lineup for Reverxe consisted of six members and did not include Baekhyun, Chen, and Xiumin (Exo-CBX), who were present for the Exist release.

Reverxe became Exo's eighth album to sell over one million copies. It reached the one-million-sale milestone by February 26, according to SM Entertainment. This continued a trend established by the group's first studio album, XOXO (2013), with all subsequent studio albums reaching million-seller status. Internationally, Reverxe reached number one on the iTunes Top Albums chart in 48 regions, including the United States, Japan, and Brazil. In China, the album reached the top of the QQ Music digital album sales chart. It was certified triple platinum by the platform for exceeding three million yuan in sales revenue, after initially receiving a double platinum certification for surpassing two million yuan. In Japan, the album appeared at number one on the Recochoku daily album ranking and the AWA real-time rising chart.

== Track listing ==
Reverxe track listing
No.	Title	Lyrics	Music	Arrangement	Length
1.	"Crown"	Kang Eun-jeong; Yoon (153/Joombas)	Adrian McKinnon; Ninos Hanna; Fabian Zeke; Kyle Buckley	Pink Slip	3:18
2.	"Back It Up"	Don Mills; Kang Eun-jeong	Ned Houston; Chelsea Warner; Anne Judith Wik; Ronny Svendsen; Adrian Thesen	Svendsen; Pizzapunk	3:20
3.	"Crazy"	Yoon (153/Joombas)	Leowi; Magnus Lie Skistad; Merili Käsper	Leowi	2:50
4.	"Suffocate"	Mola (PNP)	Cyrus Villanueva; Charlotte Wilson; Tim Tan	Tan	2:58
5.	"Moonlight Shadow"	Kim Wen-di (Jam Factory)	Wyatt Sanders; Kaitlyn Dorff; Ian Jeffrey Thomas; Mike Robbins; Krass	Thomas; Robbins	2:41
6.	"Back Pocket"	Kang Eun-yu; Deepflow	Hugo Andersson; Jonathan Bellini; SB90	SB90	3:17
7.	"Touch & Go"	Jiggy (153/Joombas)	Wyatt Sanders; Olivia Webb; Barry Cohen	Gingerbread	2:53
8.	"Flatline"	Jang Yun-ji (Jam Factory)	Amanda Cygnaeus; Noak Hellsing; Rasmus Budny	Budny	2:58
9.	"I'm Home"	Lee Hyung-seok; Bang Hye-hyun	Georgia Murray; Alexandra Soumalias; Daniel Michael Victor; Rasmus Gregersen	DMV & Ras	3:29
Total length:					27:44

== Credits and personnel ==
Credits adapted from the album's liner notes.

Studio

- SM Big Shot Studio – recording (track 1, 3–5), digital editing (track 2, 4), additional digital editing (track 1, 9), mixing (track 3–4)
- SM Yellow Tail Studio – recording (track 1–2, 4, 6–9), digital editing (track 1)
- SM Wavelet Studio – recording (track 1–3, 5–6), digital editing (track 3)
- SM Aube Studio – recording (track 2–5), digital editing (track 6)
- SM Azure Studio – recording (track 3, 5–9), digital editing (track 2, 5, 7–8)
- SM Dorii Studio – recording (track 6)
- SM Droplet Studio – recording, digital editing (track 6)
- Seoul Studio – recording (track 9)
- Doobdoob Studio – digital editing (track 4)
- SM Starlight Studio – digital editing (track 9), mixing (track 7–8)
- SM Concert Hall Studio – mixing (track 1, 9)
- SM Blue Ocean Studio – mixing (track 2)
- SM Blue Cup Studio – mixing (track 5–6)
- 821 Sound – mastering (all tracks)

Personnel

- SM Entertainment – executive producer
- Exo – vocals (all tracks)
  - Suho – background vocals (track 5)
  - Lay – background vocals (track 5)
  - Chanyeol – background vocals (track 1, 5, 8–9)
  - D.O. – background vocals (track 5)
  - Sehun – background vocals (track 5)
- Kang Eun-jeong – lyrics (track 1–2)
- Yoon (153/Joombas) – lyrics (track 1, 3)
- Adrian McKinnon – composition, background vocals (track 1)
- Ninos Hanna – composition (track 1)
- Fabian Zeke – composition (track 1)
- Kyle Buckley a.k.a. Pink Slip – producer, composition, arrangement (track 1)
- Don Mills – lyrics (track 2)
- Ned Houston – composition, background vocals (track 2)
- Chelsea Warner – composition, background vocals (track 2)
- Anne Judith Wik – composition, background vocals (track 2)
- Ronny Svendsen – producer, composition, arrangement, background vocals (track 2)
- Adrian Thesen a.k.a. Pizzapunk – producer, composition, arrangement (track 2)
- Leowi – producer, composition, arrangement (track 3)
- Magnus Lie Skistad – composition (track 3)
- Merili Käsper – composition (track 3)
- Mola (PNP) – lyrics (track 4)
- Cyrus Villanueva – composition (track 4)
- Charlotte Wilson – composition (track 4)
- Tim Tan – producer, composition, arrangement, bass, guitar, keyboard (track 4)
- Kim Wen-di (Jam Factory) – lyrics (track 5)
- Wyatt Sanders – composition (track 5, 7)
- Kaitlyn Dorff – composition (track 5)
- Ian Jeffrey Thomas – producer, composition, arrangement (track 5)
- Mike Robbins – producer, composition, arrangement (track 5)
- Krass – composition (track 5)
- Kang Eun-yu – lyrics (track 6)
- Deepflow – lyrics (track 6)
- Hugo Andersson – composition (track 6)
- Jonathan Bellini – composition (track 6)
- Stuart Le Brander a.k.a. SB90 – producer, composition, arrangement, bass, guitar, keyboard, synthesizer (track 6)
- Jiggy (153/Joombas) – lyrics (track 7)
- Olivia Webb – composition (track 7)
- Barry Cohen a.k.a. Gingerbread – producer, composition, arrangement (track 7)
- Jang Yun-ji (Jam Factory) – lyrics (track 8)
- Amanda Cygnaeus – composition (track 8)
- Noak Hellsing – composition (track 8)
- Rasmus Budny – producer, composition, arrangement (track 8)
- Lee Hyung-seok – lyrics (track 9)
- Bang Hye-hyun – lyrics (track 9)
- Georgia Murray – composition (track 9)
- Alexandra Soumalias – composition (track 9)
- Daniel Michael Victor a.k.a. DMV (DMV & Ras) – producer, composition, arrangement (track 9)
- Rasmus Gregersen a.k.a. Ras (DMV & Ras) – producer, composition, arrangement (track 9)
- Choi Hee-joon (Phenomenotes) – additional directing (track 9)
- Hyunki – keyboard (track 9)
- Moon Jung-jae – strings recording directing (track 9)
- SM Classics Town Orchestra – strings (track 9)
- Kriz – vocal directing (track 1, 3)
- Xydo – vocal directing, background vocals (track 2)
- Hyun – vocal directing (track 4–5), background vocals (track 1, 3–5)
- Sam Carter – vocal directing (track 6)
- Emily Yeonseo Kim – vocal directing (track 7–9)
- PIT300 – background vocals (track 1)
- Oiaisle – background vocals (track 6–7)
- Joowon – background vocals (track 8–9)
- Kang Tae-woo a.k.a. Soulman – background vocals (track 9)
- Lee Min-kyu – recording (track 1, 3–5), digital editing (track 2, 4), additional digital editing (track 1, 9), mixing (track 3–4)
- Noh Min-ji – recording (track 1–2, 4, 6–9), digital editing (track 1)
- Kang Eun-ji – recording (track 1–3, 5–6), digital editing (track 3)
- Kim Hyo-joon – recording (track 2–5), digital editing (track 6)
- Kim Jae-yeon – recording (track 3, 5–9), digital editing (track 2, 5, 7–8)
- Jeong Jae-won – recording (track 6)
- Kim Joo-hyun – recording, digital editing (track 6)
- Jeong Ki-hong – recording (track 9)
- Choi Da-in – recording (track 9)
- Lee Chan-mi – recording (track 9)
- Eugene Kwon – digital editing (track 4)
- Jeong Yoo-ra – digital editing (track 9), mixing (track 7–8)
- Nam Koong-jin – mixing (track 1, 9)
- Kim Cheol-sun – mixing (track 2)
- Jung Eui-seok – mixing (track 5–6)
- Kwon Nam-woo – mastering (all tracks)

== Charts ==
=== Weekly charts ===
Weekly chart performance for Reverxe
Chart (2026)	Peak position
Japanese Albums (Oricon)	8
Japanese Combined Albums (Oricon)	9
Japanese Hot Albums (Billboard Japan)	36
South Korean Albums (Circle)	1
UK Album Downloads (Official Charts)	29

=== Monthly charts ===
Monthly chart performance for Reverxe
Chart (2026)	Position
Japanese Albums (Oricon)	30
South Korean Albums (Circle)	3

== Certifications ==
Certifications for Reverxe
Region	Certification	Certified units/sales
South Korea (KMCA)	3× Platinum	750,000^{^}
^{^} Shipments figures based on certification alone.

== Release history ==
Release history for Reverxe
Region	Date	Format	Label
South Korea	2026	CD; SMC	SM; Kakao
Various	2026	Digital download; streaming	SM; Kakao
