= Sweet Dream (single album) =

Single album by Chuei Liyu
- Released: December 3, 2025
- Length: 8:22
- Language: Korean, English
- Label: FNC Entertainment

Singles from Sweet Dream
- 1. "UxYouxU" Released: December 3, 2025

Sweet Dream is the debut single album by Taiwanese male singer Chuei Liyu, featuring three songs, including the lead single "UxYouxU". It was released by FNC Entertainment on December 3, 2025.

== Background and promotion ==
In late October 2025, several media outlets reported that Chuei would make his solo debut in December of the same year. On November 17, FNC Entertainment announced that he would hold his first solo fan meeting, titled Drawing Yu, on December 20 at Sejong University. On November 18, the first teaser image for his debut single album was released. The following day, the official concept photos for the album Sweet Dreams were unveiled, confirming his solo debut on December 3. On November 24, it was announced that an additional Drawing Yu fan meeting would be held in Taipei on January 3, 2026, after tickets for the Seoul event sold out.

On December 3, Chuei released the lead single "UxYouxU" from his debut single album Sweet Dream, which was officially released on the same day.

== Track listing ==
Sweet Dream track listing
No.	Title	Lyrics	Music	Arrangement	Length
1.	"UxYouxU"	Han Seong-ho; Yongbae; Haedo (Papermaker)	Han Seong-ho; Yongbae (RBW); Haedo (Papermaker)		2:25
2.	"Fresh"	Han Seong-ho; Yongbae (RBW); Haedo (Papermaker)	Han Seong-ho; Yongbae (RBW); Haedo (Papermaker); SlyBerry; Rockchain	SlyBerry; Rockchain	3:00
3.	"Hello My Friend"	Han Seong-ho; Yongbae (RBW); Cyd	Han Seong-ho; Yongbae (RBW); Cyd; Taey (LOGOS); Wu	Taey (LOGOS); Wu	2:57
Total length:					8:22

== Charts ==
=== Weekly charts ===
Weekly chart performance for Sweet Dream
Chart (2025–2026)	Peak position
Japan (Oricon)	17
Japan Top Singles Sales (Billboard Japan)	15
South Korean Albums (Circle)	5

=== Monthly charts ===
Monthly chart performance for Sweet Dream
Chart (2025)	Position
South Korean Albums (Circle)	8
