= Pulse (EP) =

EP by Rescene
- Released: November 3, 2026
- Length: 15:43
- Labels: The Muze; Kakao

Singles from Pulse
- 1. "With" Released: November 3, 2026

Pulse is the fourth extended play (EP) by the South Korean girl group Rescene. Released on November 3, 2026, the album consists of five tracks, including the lead single With.

== Background and release ==
On September 22, 2026, it was announced that Rescene would release their fourth extended play, Pulse, on November 3, 2026.

== Composition ==
The title track, With, is a song, as member Liv describes it, "a song that captures the moment when [Rescene] follows the voice calling it and encounters the one it has long dreamed of."

== Sales ==
The EP was successful, selling over 600,000 units within its first week.

== Tracklisting ==
No.	Title	Lyrics	Music	Arrangement	Length
1.	"Finest Thing"	이주헌 (Lee Joo Heon) (The Muze); 더풀킴 (Derful Kim) (The Muze)	Kes Kamara; Tom Hollings; Sam Brennan; Ines Dunn; 岡嶋かな多 (Kanata Okajima); mOnSteR nO.9	Kes Kamara; Tom Hollings; Sam Brennan; mOnSteR nO.9	2:20
2.	"With"	방혜현 (Bang Hye Hyun); 이주헌 (Lee Joo Heon) (The Muze); 더풀킴 (Derful Kim) (The Muze); 조인호 (Jo In Ho) (lalala studio)	Gusten Dahlqvist; Arineh; Christian Fast; 이주헌 (Lee Joo Heon) (The Muze); 더풀킴 (Derful Kim) (The Muze); 황세영 (Hwang Se Young) (The Muze)	Gusten Dahlqvist; 이주헌 (Lee Joo Heon) (The Muze); 더풀킴 (Derful Kim) (The Muze); 황세영 (Hwang Se Young) (The Muze)	3:11
3.	"Inside Out"	이주헌 (Lee Joo Heon) (The Muze); 더풀킴 (Derful Kim) (The Muze); airy (153/Joombas); ORiJiN (153/Joombas)	Jonatan Gusmark; Ludvig Evers; Ellen Berg; EJAE; Emily Kim	Moonshine	3:31
4.	"Meme"	이주헌 (Lee Joo Heon) (The Muze); 더풀킴 (Derful Kim) (The Muze); 조은솔 (Cho Eun Sol) (Jam Factory); 김인 (Kim In) (153/Joombas)	mOnSteR nO.9; VORADORY; 홍준석 (JAY Hong); Louise Udin	mOnSteR nO.9; VORADORY	3:01
5.	"Dragon"	이주헌 (Lee Joo Heon) (The Muze); 더풀킴 (Derful Kim) (The Muze); 달리 (Dally) (Jam Factory); 박은빈 (Park Eun Bin) (Jamfactory); 임수란 (Im Su Ran)	Felix Back; Christoffer Jonsson; Judith Timan Olofsson	Felix Back; Christoffer Jonsson	3:40
Total length:					15:43

== Charts ==
=== Weekly charts ===
Chart (2026)	Peak position
Japanese Hot Albums (Billboard Japan)	70
South Korea (Circle)	3
