= Flare U =

South Korean musical duo

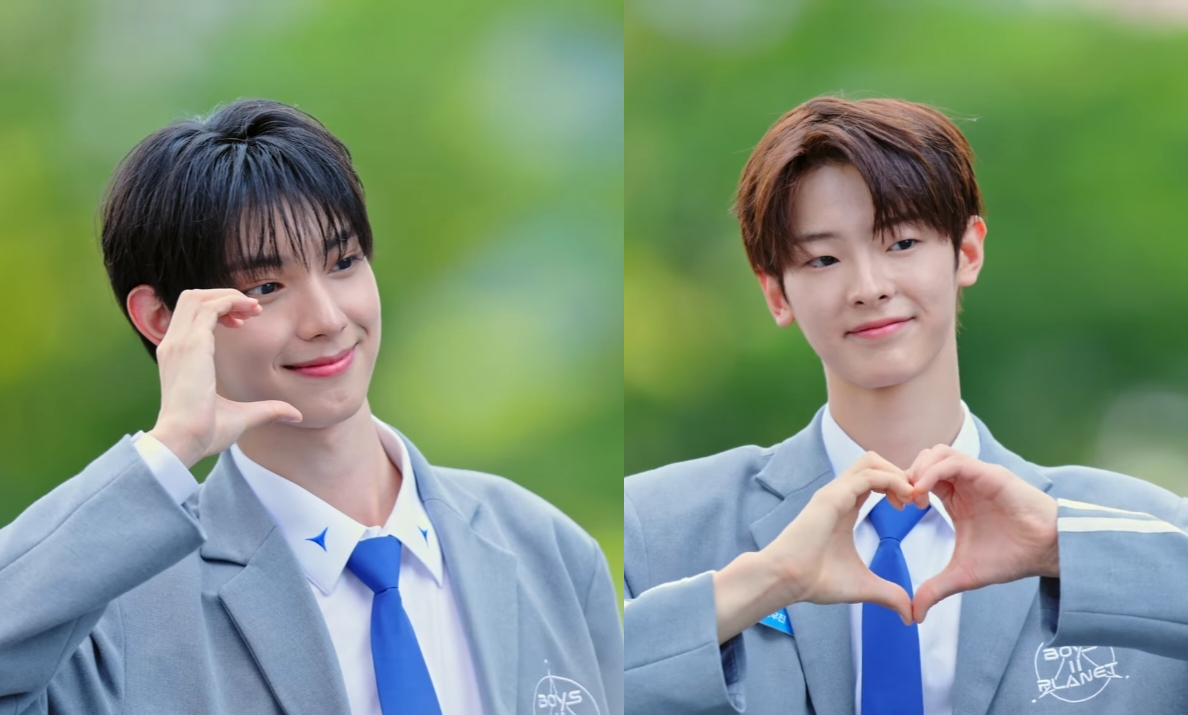
- L-R: Chuei Liyu, and Kang Woo-jin

Background information
- Origin: Seoul, South Korea
- Genre: K-pop
- Years active: 2026–present
- Label: FNC
- Members: Chuei Liyu; Kang Woo-jin

Flare U (Korean: 플레어 유; stylized in all caps) is a South Korean musical duo consisting of members Chuei Liyu and Kang Woo-jin. Formed and managed by FNC Entertainment, the duo debuted on May 13, 2026, with the extended play (EP) Youth Error.

== History ==
On January 26, 2026, media outlets reported that a project group consisting of Mnet's Boys II Planet contestants Chuei Liyu, Kang Woo-jin, and Jang Han-eum was in development. The reports stated that CJ ENM would handle production while FNC Entertainment would manage the group. In response, Jang's agency, ES Nation, stated they were reviewing the proposal while focusing on his solo album release scheduled for March.

On March 10, 2026, FNC announced that following discussions, Chuei and Kang would debut as a duo without Jang. Prior to this, after Boys II Planet ended in September 2025, Choi and Kang had appeared together in branded content, attended each other's fan meetings, and served as temporary hosts for the MBC FM4U radio program Close Friend Broadcasting Club. On March 18, the duo was added to the lineup for KCON Japan 2026 at the Makuhari Messe in Chiba, Japan. Their scheduled activities included appearances on the "Dance Stage" on May 8 and 10, and a showcase on the "X Stage" on May 9.

FNC launched the duo's official social media channels on April 24, 2026, announcing the group name Flare U alongside a logo trailer and concept images. According to the agency, the name represents two lights combining to become complete when joined by their fans. Two days later, the promotional schedule for the duo's debut was released along with their debuted date to be on May 13, 2026, with the release of their first EP, Youth Error, and its lead single "Way 2 U", which features themes centered around youth and the duo's shared experiences since appearing on Boys II Planet.

== Discography ==
=== Extended plays ===
==== Korean EPs ====
List of extended plays, showing selected details, selected chart positions, and sales figures
Title	Details	Peak chart positions		Sales
Title	Details	KOR	JPN	Sales
Youth Error	Released: May 13, 2026; Label: FNC Entertainment; Formats: CD, digital download, streaming; Track listing: 1. "Way 2 U"; 2. "Hyper"; 3. "Don't Cry" (우니까); 4. "Miracle"; 5. "Woo-Hoo"; 6. "Playground" (놀이터)	4	17	KOR: 187,255; JPN: 5,217
Lovehood	Released: October 14, 2026; Label: FNC Entertainment; Formats: CD, digital download, streaming; Track listing: 1. "Bloom" (너의 계절이 찾아와); 2. "Hundred Nights" (백일밤); 3. "False Alarm"; 4. "Madly in Love"; 5. "Window View"; 6. "Never Ever" (잠시 너를 잊었어)	9	—	KOR: 82,695
"—" denotes a recording that did not chart or was not released in that territory.

==== Japanese EPs ====
Title	Details
Youth Error Japan Edition	Released: May 13, 2026; Label: FNC Entertainment; Formats: CD, digital download, streaming; Track listing: 1. "Doom Ba Doom Doom Ba"; 2. "Way 2 U" (Japanese version); 3. "Hyper" (Japanese version); 4. "Don't Cry" (Japanese version); 5. "Way 2 U" (CD only); 6. "Hyper" (CD only); 7. "Don't Cry" (우니까; CD only); 8. "Miracle" (CD only); 9. "Woo-Hoo" (CD only); 10. "Playground" (놀이터; CD only)

=== Singles ===
List of singles, showing year released, selected chart positions, and name of the album
Title	Year	Peak chart positions	Album
Title	Year	KOR DL	Album
"Way 2 U"	2026	4	Youth Error

=== Other charted songs ===
List of other songs, showing year released, selected chart positions, and name of the album
Title	Year	Peak chart positions	Album
Title	Year	KOR DL	Album
"Hyper"	2026	30	Youth Error
"Don't Cry"	2026	35	Youth Error
"Miracle"	2026	37	Youth Error
"Woo-Hoo"	2026	36	Youth Error
"Playground"	2026	34	Youth Error
