= Chuei Liyu =

Taiwanese singer (born 2004)

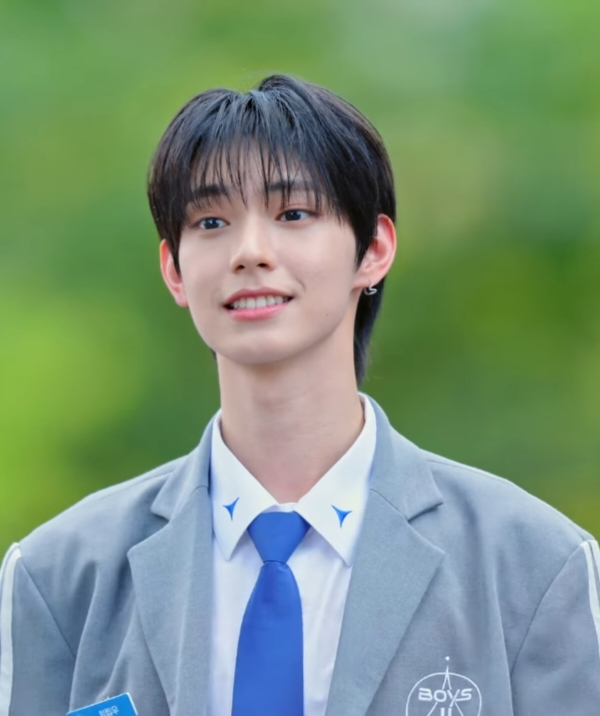
- Chuei in June 2025
- Born: January 2, 2004 (age 22); Taipei, Taiwan
- Other names: Fredrick Choi; Choi Lip-woo
- Occupation: Singer
- Musical career
- Origin: Seoul, South Korea
- Genres: K-pop; Dance-pop
- Instrument: Vocals
- Years active: 2025–present
- Label: FNC Entertainment
- Member of: Flare U

Chinese name
- Traditional Chinese: 崔立于
- Simplified Chinese: 崔立于
- Hanyu Pinyin: Cuī Lìyú

Korean name
- Hangul: 최립우
- RR: Choe Ripu
- MR: Ch'oe Ribu

Chuei Liyu (Chinese: 崔立于; Korean: 최립우; born January 2, 2004), is a Taiwanese singer based in South Korea. He rose to prominence as a contestant on Mnet's reality competition show Boys II Planet. He made his debut as a solo artist on December 3, 2025, with the single album Sweet Dream. He is currently active as the leader of the K-pop duo Flare U, after they debuted on May 13, 2026.

== Career ==
=== 2025–present: Boys II Planet, solo debut and Flare U ===
On June 7, 2025, Chuei was unveiled as a contestant on Mnet's reality competition show Boys II Planet, representing his agency FNC Entertainment. The show aired from July 17 to September 25, 2025. He was eliminated on the final episode of the show, finishing in tenth place. In late October, several media outlets reported that Chuei would make his solo debut in December of the same year. On November 17, FNC Entertainment announced that he would hold his first solo fan meeting, titled Drawing Yu, on December 20 at Sejong University. On November 18, the first teaser image for his debut single album was released. The following day, the official concept photos for the album Sweet Dreams were unveiled, confirming his solo debut on December 3. On November 24, it was announced that an additional Drawing Yu fan meeting would be held in Taipei on January 3, 2026, after tickets for the Seoul event sold out. His debut single album Sweet Dream was officially released on December 3. On December 23, it was announced that Chuei would hold his first exhibition, "fredr1ck._choi Archive", from December 25 to December 31.

On January 26, 2026, it was officially announced that Chuei along with former Boys II Planet contestants Jang Han-eum and Kang Woo-jin would debut in a spin-off group of Boys II Planet. The group was produced by CJ ENM and managed by FNC Entertainment. It was later announced that Kang Woo-jin and Chuei would debut as a duo called Flare U under FNC Entertainment, with their first appearance at KCON Japan 2026.

== Other ventures ==
=== Fashion ===
In 2025, Chuei appeared in several fashion magazine pictorials ahead of his solo debut. In November, he was featured in a digital pictorial for Marie Claire Korea and later, he participated in a Cosmopolitan Korea photoshoot. In December, he was featured in W Korea (Vol. 13) and appeared in a pictorial for Kitto, a global social media magazine.

== Discography ==
=== Single albums ===
List of single albums, with selected details and chart positions
Title	Details	Peak chart positions	Sales
Title	Details	KOR	Sales
Sweet Dream	Released: December 3, 2025; Label: FNC Entertainment; Formats: CD, digital download, streaming	5	KOR: 115,990

=== Songs ===
Title	Year	Peak chart position	Album
Title	Year	KOR DL	Album
"UxYOUxU"	2025	3	Sweet Dream
"Fresh"	2025	29	Sweet Dream
"Hello My Friend"	2025	30	Sweet Dream

== Filmography ==
=== Television shows ===
Year	Title	Role	Notes	Ref.
2025	Boys II Planet	Contestant	Finished in 10th place	

=== Hosting ===
Hosting appearances
Year	Title	Role	Notes	Ref.
2025	Show! Music Core	Special MC	with Kangmin	
2026-present	The Show	MC	with Minjae	

== Performances ==
=== Fan meetings ===
Title	Date	Venue	City	Country	Ref.
Drawing Yu	December 20–21, 2025	Daeyang Hall, Sejong University	Seoul	South Korea	
Drawing Yu	January 3, 2026	Westar	Taipei	Taiwan	
Drawing Yu	January 24, 2026	Macau Broadway Theatre	Macau	China	
Drawing Yu	January 25, 2026	Idea Live Hall	Bangkok	Thailand	

== Awards and nominations ==
Name of the award ceremony, year presented, category, nominee(s) of the award, and the result of the nomination
Award ceremony	Year	Category	Nominee(s)	Result	Ref.
D Awards	2026	Best Popularity Award – Boy Solo	Chuei Liyu	Won	
D Awards	2026	Discovery of the Year	Chuei Liyu	Won	
