= Pretty Girl (Rescene song) =

Single by Rescene
- Language: Korean
- Released: July 8, 2026
- Genre: Teen pop
- Length: 3:30
- Label: The Muze
- Composers: Han Jae-ho; Kim Seung-soo
- Lyricists: Song Soo-yoon; Han Jae-ho; Kim Seung-soo

Rescene singles chronology
"Runaway" (2026)	"Pretty Girl" (2026)

Music video
- "Pretty Girl" on YouTube

"Pretty Girl" is a song recorded by South Korean girl group Rescene. It was released by The Muze Entertainment on July 8, 2026.

== Background and release ==
On May 22, 2026, The Muze Entertainment announced that Rescene would release a remake single in July 2026. On June 19, it was announced that Rescene would release a digital single titled "Pretty Girl" on July 8. The single would be a remake of Kara's 2008 "Pretty Girl". On July 6, the music video teaser was released. The song was released alongside its music video on July 8.

== Composition ==
"Pretty Girl" was primarily written, composed, and arranged by Han Jae-ho and Kim Seung-soo, with Song Soo-yoon contributing to the lyrics writing, Lee Joo-heon of The Muze, The Muze, and Hwang Se-young contributing to the arrangement. It is described as a teen pop song.

== Accolades ==
Music program awards
Program	Date	Ref.
Show! Music Core	July 25, 2026	
Show! Music Core	August 8, 2026	
Show! Music Core	August 15, 2026	
The Show	July 14, 2026	

== Commercial performance ==
"Pretty Girl" debuted at number 19 on South Korea's Circle Digital Chart in the chart issue dated July 5–11, 2026; on its component charts, the song debuted at number two on the Circle Download Chart, number 47 on the Circle Streaming Chart, and number 20 on the Circle BGM Chart. The song ascended to number five on the Circle Digital Chart and Circle Streaming Chart in the chart issue dated August 9–15, 2026, and number ten on the Circle BGM Chart in the chart issue dated July 12–18, 2026.

== Credits and personnel ==
Credits adapted from Melon.

Studio

- Doobdoob Studio – recording
- Stadion Studio – mixing
- 821 Sound – mastering

Personnel

- Rescene – vocals
  - Minami – background vocals
- Kim Boa – background vocals, vocal director
- Lee Joo-heon (The Muze) – vocal director, arrangement
- Kim Hye-soo – vocal director, synth, MIDI programming
- Song Soo-yoon – lyrics
- Han Jae-ho – lyrics, composition, arrangement, synth, MIDI programming
- Kim Seung-soo – lyrics, composition, arrangement, synth, MIDI programming
- Hong Jun-ho – guitar
- Lee Tae-yoon – bass
- Jang Won-young – recording
- Simon Bergseth – mixing
- Kwon Nam-woo – mastering

== Charts ==
Chart performance for "Pretty Girl"
Chart (2026)	Peak position
South Korea (Circle)	5

== Release history ==
Release history for "Pretty Girl"
Region	Date	Format	Label
Various	July 8, 2026	Digital download; streaming	The Muze
