= Idntt =

South Korean boy group

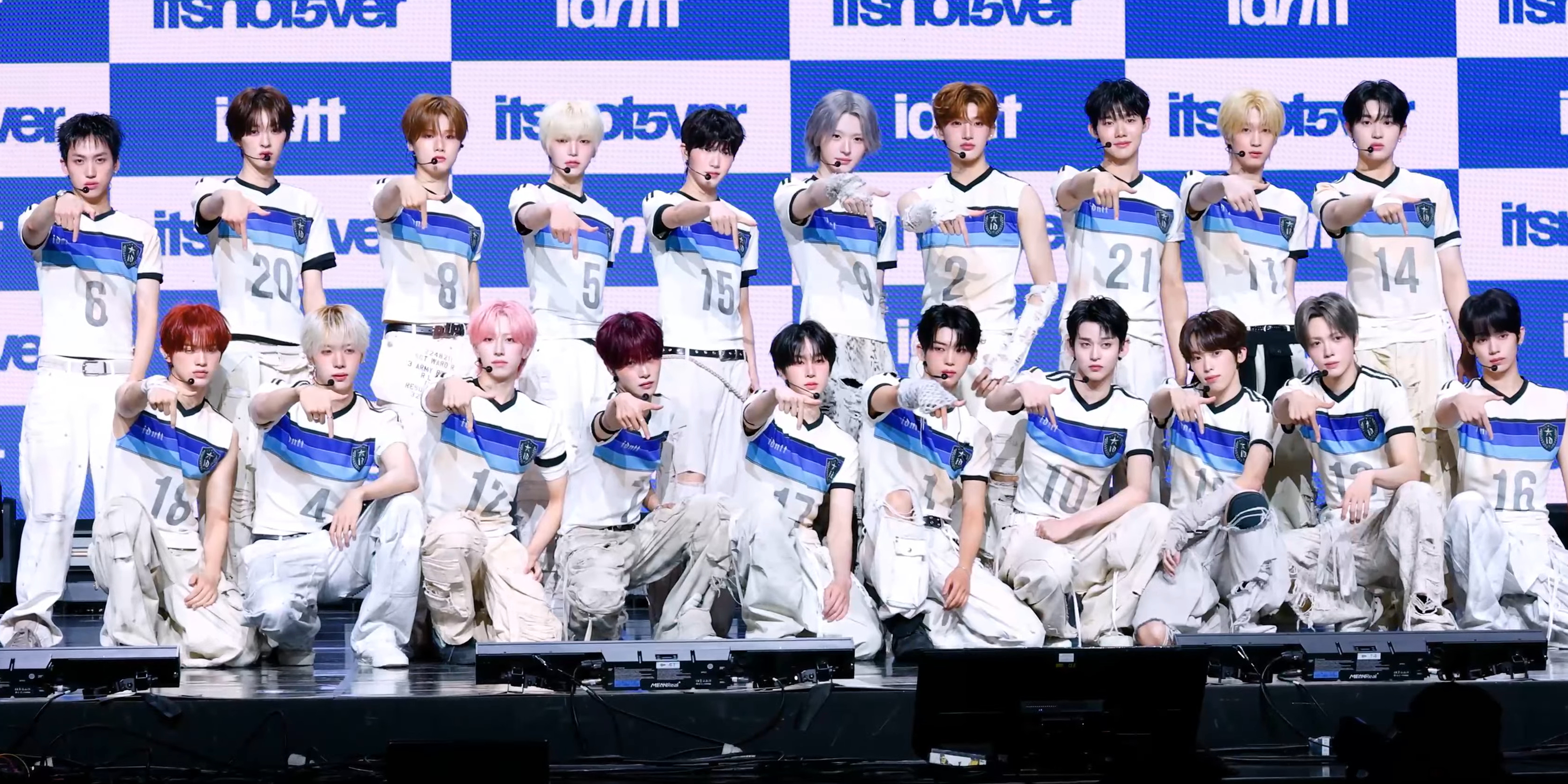
- Idntt in 2026

Background information
- Origin: Seoul, South Korea
- Genre: K-pop
- Years active: 2025–present
- Label: Modhaus
- Spinoffs: Uneverm8t; Yesw8are; Itsnot5ver
- Members: see Members
- Website: Official website

Idntt (pronounced "identity"; Korean: 아이덴티티; stylized as idntt) is an upcoming South Korean 24-member boy band formed by Modhaus. The group has debuted three sub-units ahead of their debut as a full group.

The first sub-unit, Uneverm8t (stylized as uneverm8t), debuted with seven members on August 11, 2025, with the extended play (EP) Unevermet. The second sub-unit, Yesw8are (stylized as yesw8are), debuted with eight members on January 5, 2026 on with the EP Yesweare. The third sub-unit, Itsnot5ver (stylized as itsnot5ver), debuted on July 13 with five members with the EP Itsnotover. The final four members of group were revealed in November, with fans being included in the selection process.

== History ==
=== 2024–present: Debuts of sub-units ===
On May 10, 2024, days after the full 24-member debut of their girl group TripleS, Modhaus announced plans to debut a "male version" of the group. On April 24, 2025, Modhaus released a teaser video announcing their upcoming boy group named Idntt. On July 1, Modhaus announced plans to debut 24 members of the group in three stages of eight boys each as the sub-units Uneverm8t, Yesw8are, and Itsnotov8r.

On July 12, Modhaus released a video announcing the first sub-unit Uneverm8t: Kim Do-hun, Kim Hee-juu, Hwangbo Min-gyeol, Choi Tae-in, Lee Jae-young, Kim Ju-ho, Nam Ji-woon, and Lee Hwan-hee. On July 21, Modhaus announced they had suspended the activities of Hwangbo Min-gyeol due to controversy, stating Uneverm8t will debut as seven members and Hwangbo would debut with the second unit Yesweare and resume activities after verifying the accusations. On July 29, Modhaus released the first group photo of Uneverm8t and announced their debut album to be released on August 11. The tracklist was revealed on July 31. A character film introducing each of the members was released on August 4. From August 5 through 7, Modhaus released a teaser each for the music videos of the triple title tracks "You Never Met", "Storm", and "Boytude". On August 11, the first sub-unit Uneverm8t debuted with their eponymously titled extended play and held a debut showcase in Seoul. Uneverm8t released a digital single titled "8:11" on November 11. In December, Hwangbo Min-gyeol left the group.

In December, Modhaus announced the second subunit Yesw8are would debut on January 5, 2026. A highlight medley for their debut extended play was released on December 29. On January 1, 2026, a teaser video was released for the title track "Pretty Boy Swag". On January 5, Yesw8are debuted with members Lee Cheong-myeong, Towa, Lee Kyu-hyuk, Park Nu-ri, Kim Seong-jun, Han Ye-joon, Choi Gyeong-been, and Hwang Eun-soo through their EP Yesweare, with the title track "Pretty Boy Swag" including vocals by the seven members of the first sub-unit. On February 11, the sub-unit released the single "All I Need".

On July 13, the final sub-unit Itsnot5ver debuted through their eponymous extended play with five members instead of the planned eight: Kwak Gi-woong, Lee Joo-heon, Yang Gyung-ho, Cho Eun-chan, Kim Eun-sung. On August 12, the Itsnot5ver sub-unit single "Deep Dream" was released. On October 9, Idntt released the song "Linda Mía" ahead of their Latin American promotion tour in November. The song includes Spanish lyrics. In October, Modhaus announced they were beginning the process of selecting the final four members of Idntt with a fan vote to eliminate one candidate from a list of nine trainees. On November 5, the final four members were announced: Yun Sun-jae, Koo Do-hyung, Park Gyeong-ryul, and Kim Ji-hoo.

== Members ==
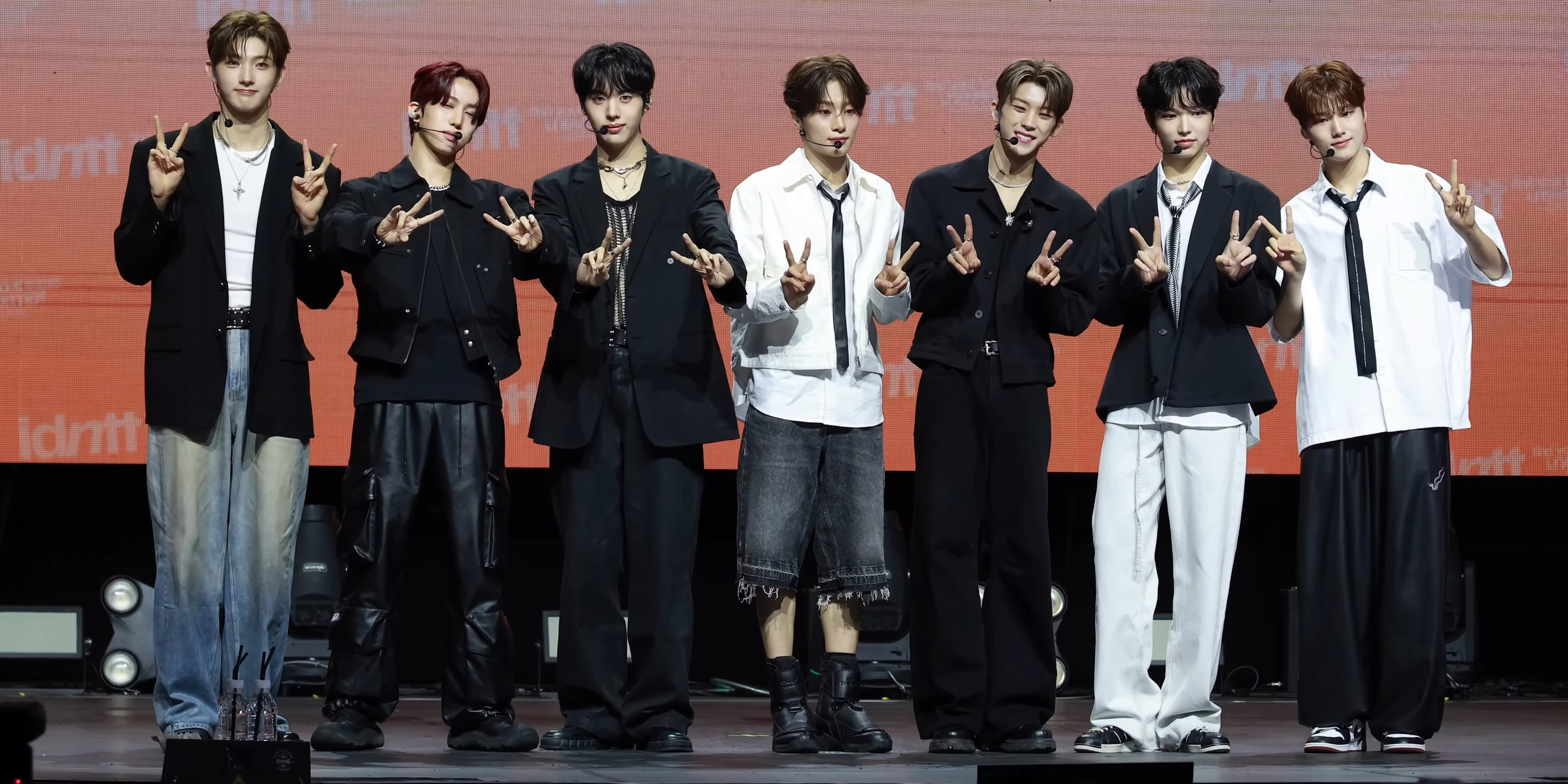
Members of Idntt's first sub-unit Uneverm8t during their debut showcase, 2025.

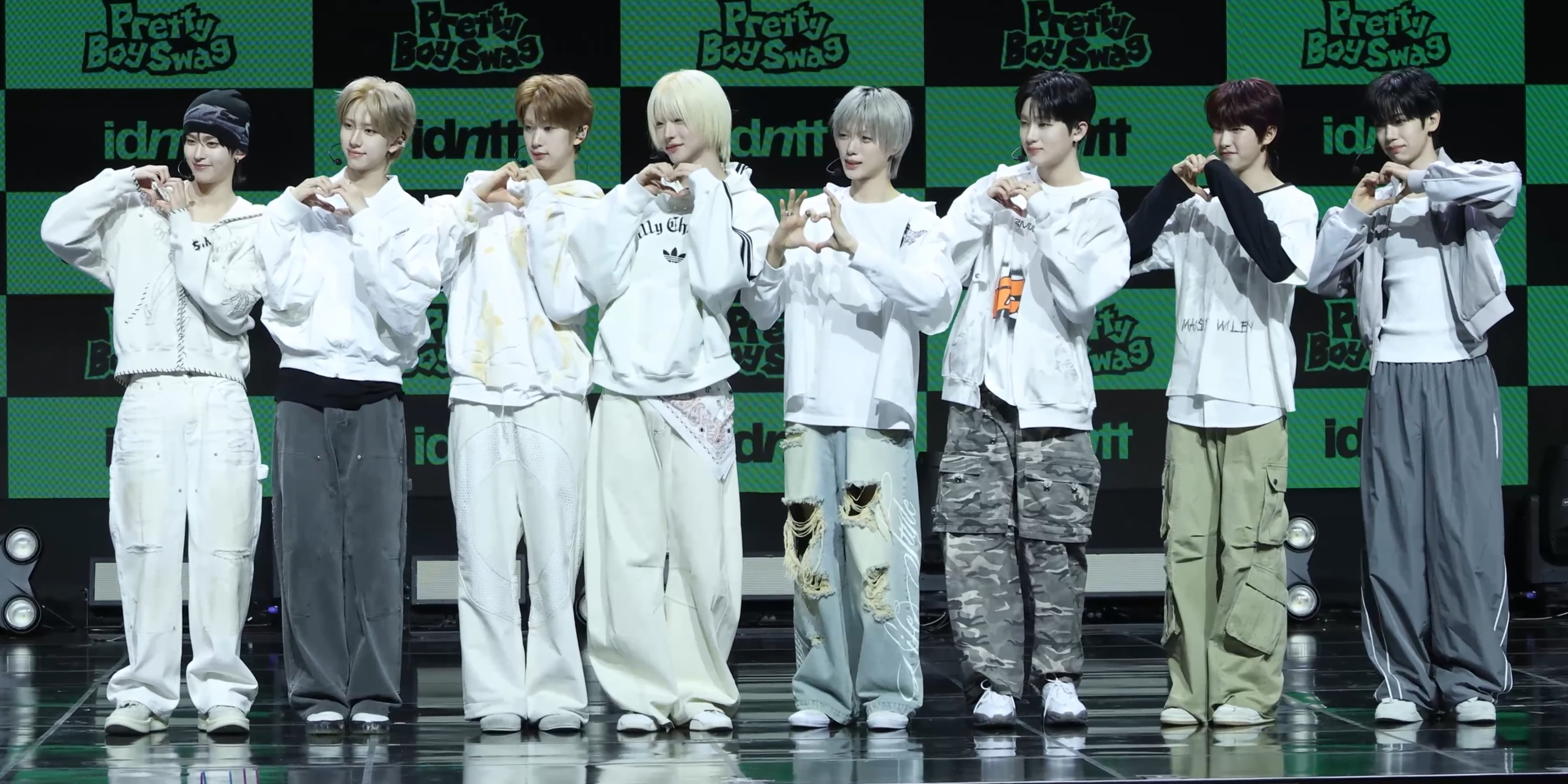
Members of Idntt's second sub-unit Yesw8are during their debut showcase, 2026.

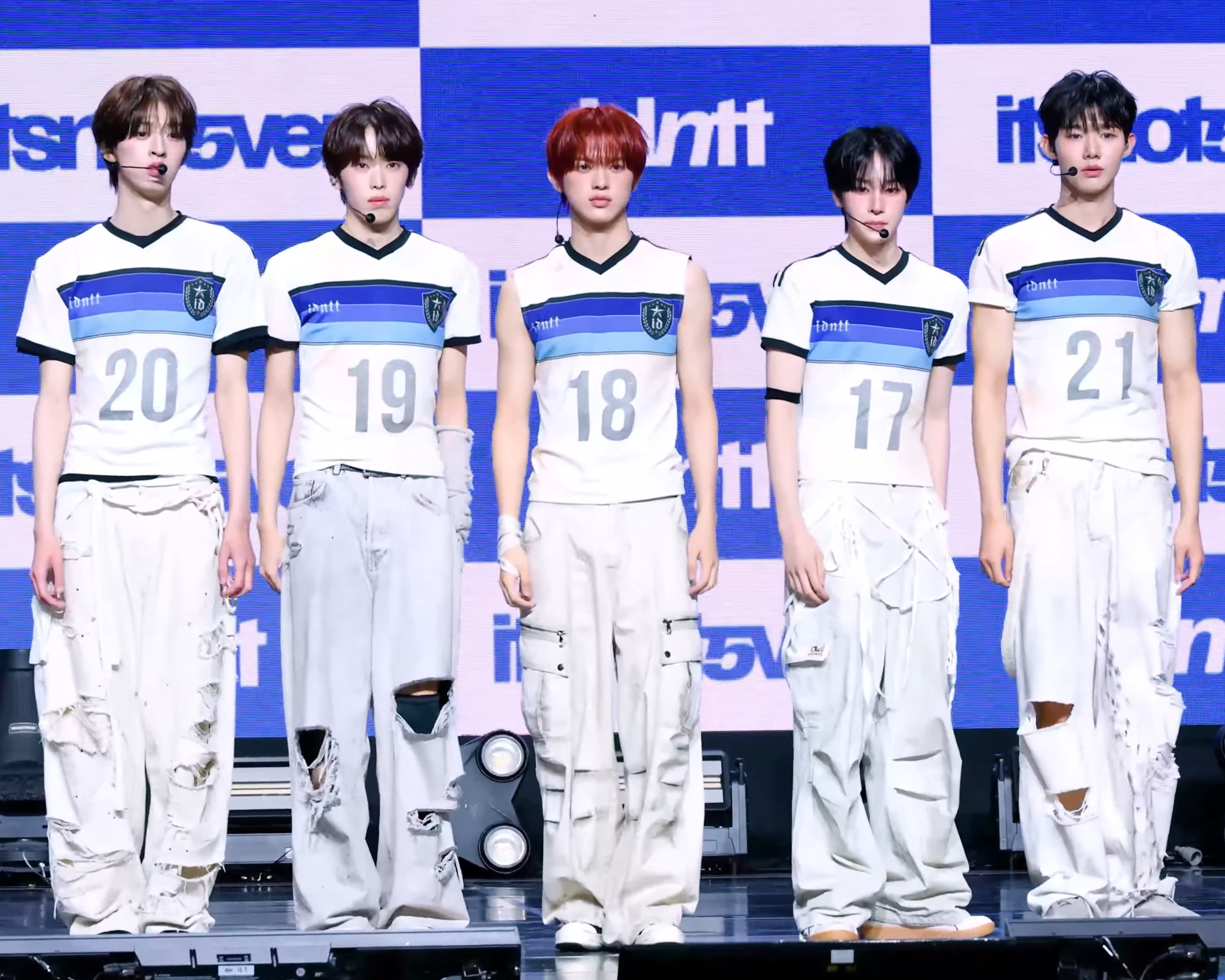
Members of Idntt's third sub-unit Itsnot5ver during their debut showcase, 2026.

ID	Name	Debut date	Sub-units		
ID	Name	Debut date	Uneverm8t	Yesw8are	Itsnot5ver
Id1	Kim Do-hun	August 11, 2025			
Id2	Kim Hee-ju	August 11, 2025			
Id4	Choi Tae-in	August 11, 2025			
Id5	Lee Jae-young	August 11, 2025			
Id6	Kim Ju-ho	August 11, 2025			
Id7	Nam Ji-woon	August 11, 2025	★		
Id8	Lee Hwan-hee	August 11, 2025			
Id9	Lee Cheong-myeong	January 5, 2026		★	
Id10	Towa	January 5, 2026			
Id11	Lee Kyu-hyuk	January 5, 2026			
Id12	Park Nu-ri	January 5, 2026			
Id13	Kim Seong-jun	January 5, 2026			
Id14	Han Ye-joon	January 5, 2026			
Id15	Choi Gyeong-been	January 5, 2026			
Id16	Hwang Eun-soo	January 5, 2026			
Id17	Kwak Gi-woong	July 13, 2026			
Id18	Lee Joo-heon	July 13, 2026			
Id19	Yang Gyung-ho	July 13, 2026			
Id20	Cho Eun-chan	July 13, 2026			
Id21	Kim Eun-sung	July 13, 2026			
Id3	Yun Sun-jae	TBA			
Id22	Koo do-hyung	TBA			
Id23	Park Gyeon-grul	TBA			
Id24	Kim Ji-hoo	TBA			
		"★" denotes sub-unit leader			

== Discography ==
=== Extended plays ===
==== Uneverm8t ====
List of Uneverm8t extended plays, showing selected details, sales figures, and certifications
Title	Details	Peak chart positions	Sales	Certifications
Title	Details	KOR	Sales	Certifications
Unevermet	Released: August 11, 2025; Label: ModHaus; Formats: CD, digital download, streaming; Track listing: 1. "New"; 2. "You Never Met"; 3. "Storm" (던져); 4. "Boytude"; 5. "Instant Chemistry"; 6. "Ego : Limitless"; 7. "Adolescence"	1	KOR: 347,094	KMCA: Platinum

==== Yesw8are ====
List of Yesw8are extended plays, showing selected details, sales figures, and certifications
Title	Details	Peak chart positions	Sales	Certifications
Title	Details	KOR	Sales	Certifications
Yesweare	Released: January 5, 2026; Label: ModHaus; Formats: CD, digital download, streaming; Track listing: 1. "Boys"; 2. "Yes We Are"; 3. "Pretty Boy Swag"; 4. "Rage Problem"; 5. "Moon Burn"	1	KOR: 422,468	KMCA: Platinum

==== Itsnot5ver ====
List of Itsnot5ver extended plays, showing selected details, sales figures, and certifications
Title	Details	Peak chart positions	Sales
Title	Details	KOR	Sales
Itsnotover	Released: July 13, 2026; Label: ModHaus; Formats: CD, digital download, streaming; Track listing: 1. "Twenty"; 2. "Kids Return"; 3. "Run It Up"; 4. "Lovestruck"; 5. "Trainspotting"; 6. "It's Not Over"; 7. "Boys Gonna Dive"	1	KOR: 284,096

=== Singles ===
List of Idntt singles, showing year released and name of the album
Title	Year	Album
"Linda Mía"	2026	Non-album single

==== Uneverm8t ====
List of Uneverm8t singles, showing year released, selected chart positions, and name of the album
Title	Year	Peak chart positions	Album
Title	Year	KOR Down.	Album
"You Never Met"	2025	134	Unevermet
"Storm" (던져)	2025	159	Unevermet
"Boytude"	2025	143	Unevermet
"8:11"	2025	—	Non-album single
"—" denotes releases that did not chart.

==== Yesw8are ====
List of Yesw8are singles, showing year released, selected chart positions, and name of the album
Title	Year	Peak chart positions	Album
Title	Year	KOR Down.	Album
"Pretty Boy Swag"	2026	4	Yesweare
"All I Need"	2026	—	Non-album single
"—" denotes releases that did not chart.

==== Itsnot5ver ====
List of Itsnot5ver singles, showing year released, selected chart positions, and name of the album
Title	Year	Peak chart positions	Album
Title	Year	KOR Down.	Album
"Kids Return"	2026	9	Itsnotover
"Deep Dream"	2026	—N/a	Non-album single

=== Other charted songs ===
==== Uneverm8t ====
List of Uneverm8t songs, showing year released, selected chart positions, and name of the album
Title	Year	Peak chart positions	Album
Title	Year	KOR Down.	Album
"New"	2025	178	Unevermet
"Instant Chemistry"	2025	180	Unevermet
"Ego: Limitless"	2025	184	Unevermet
"Adolescence"	2025	181	Unevermet

==== Yesw8are ====
List of Yesw8are songs, showing year released, selected chart positions, and name of the album
Title	Year	Peak chart positions	Album
Title	Year	KOR Down.	Album
"Boys"	2026	74	Yesweare
"Yes We Are"	2026	69	Yesweare
"Rage Problem"	2026	70	Yesweare
"Moon Burn"	2026	67	Yesweare

==== Itsnot5ver ====
List of Itsnot5ver songs, showing year released, selected chart positions, and name of the album
Title	Year	Peak chart positions	Album
Title	Year	KOR Down.	Album
"Twenty"	2026	57	Itsnotover
"Run It Up"	2026	55	Itsnotover
"Lovestruck"	2026	54	Itsnotover
"Trainspotting"	2026	56	Itsnotover
"It's Not Over"	2026	58	Itsnotover
"Boys Gonna Dive"	2026	59	Itsnotover

== Videography ==
=== Music videos ===
Title	Year	Director(s)	Ref.
"You Never Met"	2025	Unknown	
"Storm" (던져)	2025	Unknown	
"Boytude"	2025	Unknown	
"Pretty Boy Swag"	2026	Unknown	
"Yes We Are"	2026	Unknown	
"Kids Return"	2026	Unknown	
"It's Not Over"	2026	Jaden Jeong	

=== Other videos ===
Title	Year	Ref.
"Boytude" Performance Video	2025	
"Storm" (던져) Performance Video	2025	
"You Never Met" Performance Video	2025	

== Accolades ==
=== Listicles ===
Name of publisher, year listed, name of listicle, and placement
Publisher	Year	Listicle	Recipient	Placement	Ref.
Billboard	2026	K-Pop Rookie of the Month (January)	Idntt	—N/a	
Billboard	2026	The 25 Best K-Pop Songs of 2026 (So Far): Staff Picks	"Pretty Boy Swag"	25th	
