= Neon (A2O Lite song) =

Single by A2O Lite
- Language: Korean; English
- Released: October 13, 2026
- Genre: K-pop; dance-pop; electronic pop
- Length: 3:28
- Label: A2O Entertainment
- Songwriters: Dem Jointz; Yoo Young-jin
- Producers: Dem Jointz; Yoo Young-jin

Music video
- Neon on YouTube

"Neon" is the debut single by the South Korean girl group A2O Lite. It was released by A2O Entertainment on October 13, 2026. Written and produced by Yoo Young‑jin and Dem Jointz, it is a dance-pop song with lyrics in Korean and English. Upon its release, "Neon" became a commercial success internationally, debuting atop the weekly Circle Chart and reaching the top ten of the Billboard Global 200. It has also won several awards from South Korean music programs.

== Background and release ==
In 2023, the South Korean record producer Lee Soo‑man left SM Entertainment, the agency he founded in 1989 and built into one of South Korea's largest entertainment companies, where he pioneered the K‑pop idol system. The next year, he established A2O Entertainment, where he was joined by his longtime SM collaborator Yoo Young‑jin, a record producer, songwriter and vocal trainer. On October 8, 2026, A2O Entertainment launched official social media accounts for its first K‑pop girl group, A2O Lite, announcing that they would be introduced at a showcase set to be held at the Korea International Exhibition Center in Goyang on October 12, broadcast by Mnet. At the showcase, A2O Lite performed their debut single, "Neon", for the first time, before A2O Entertainment officially released it for digital download and streaming the following day.

== Composition and reception ==
Professional ratings
Review scores
Source	Rating
IZM	3/5 stars

Written and produced by Yoo Young‑jin and Dem Jointz, two longtime collaborators with Lee Soo‑man, "Neon" is an electronic dance-pop song with a strong bassline and a chorus hook comprising the phrase "neon and beyond". Kim Su‑jeong of No Cut News calls the song "intense" and "addictive" and says that "Neon" represents A2O Lite's Zalpha Pop identity.

"Neon" received generally positive reviews. Lee Jae‑hoon of IZM gave the song three out of five stars, praising Dem Jointz's intense electronic production. The Korea Times' Pyo Kyung‑min called the song "essential", further drawing attention to how "Neon" contrasted trends in the K-pop industry.

== Commercial performance ==
"Neon" is considered a massive commercial success both domestically and internationally. Within 29 hours of its release, it reached number one on South Korean streaming service Melon's real-time chart, and has stayed there for 16 days as of October 30, 2026. It debuted at number one on the weekly Circle Chart during the week of October 11–17, staying there for two weeks.

On the week dated October 31, 2026, "Neon" debuted at number eight on the Billboard Global 200. The previous week, it had debuted at number 107 on the Billboard Global Excl. US chart before jumping to number three. Additionally, it peaked at number one on two national charts besides South Korea's: Hong Kong and Taiwan. In Japan, "Neon" debuted at number 45 on the week of October 21, 2026, before rising to its peak of number nine the following week. It topped Oricon's Weekly Streaming Surge chart and reached number five on their Weekly Streaming chart. It also charted in various Southeast Asian countries, including Singapore (number two), Malaysia (number three), Thailand (number 16), and Vietnam (number 49).

== Live performances ==
"Neon"'s intro was choreographed by the South Korean hip-hop dancer J-Black.

== Accolades ==
Music program awards for "Neon"
Program	Date	Ref.
Inkigayo	October 25, 2026	
Inkigayo	November 1, 2026	
Inkigayo	November 8, 2026	
M Countdown	October 22, 2026	
Show Champion	October 21, 2026	
Show Champion	October 28, 2026	
Show K-Pop	October 26, 2026	
Show K-Pop	November 2, 2026	
Show! Music Core	October 31, 2026	
Show! Music Core	November 7, 2026	
The Show	October 20, 2026	

== Credits and personnel ==
Credits adapted from Melon.

Studio

- LeePollux Booming System – recording, mixing
- 821 Sound – mastering

Personnel

- Lee Soo-man – producer
- A2O Lite – vocals
- Dem Jointz – producer, songwriter
- Yoo Young-jin – producer, songwriter, vocal directing, background vocals, recording, mixing
- Kwon Nam-woo – mastering

== Charts ==
=== Weekly charts ===
Weekly chart performance for "Neon"
Chart (2026)	Peak position
Global 200 (Billboard)	8
Hong Kong (Billboard)	1
Japan Combined Singles (Oricon)	16
Japan Hot 100 (Billboard)	9
Malaysia (IFPI)	3
Malaysia International (RIM)	2
New Zealand Hot Singles (RMNZ)	14
Singapore (RIAS)	2
South Korea (Circle)	1
Taiwan (Billboard)	1
Thailand (IFPI)	16
US Hot Dance/Pop Songs (Billboard)	15
Vietnam Hot 100 (Billboard)	49

=== Monthly charts ===
Monthly chart performance for "Neon"
Chart (2026)	Peak position
South Korea (Circle)	1

== Release history ==
Release history for "Neon"
Region	Date	Format	Label
Various	October 13, 2026	Digital download; streaming	A2O Entertainment
