= Rescene =

South Korean girl group

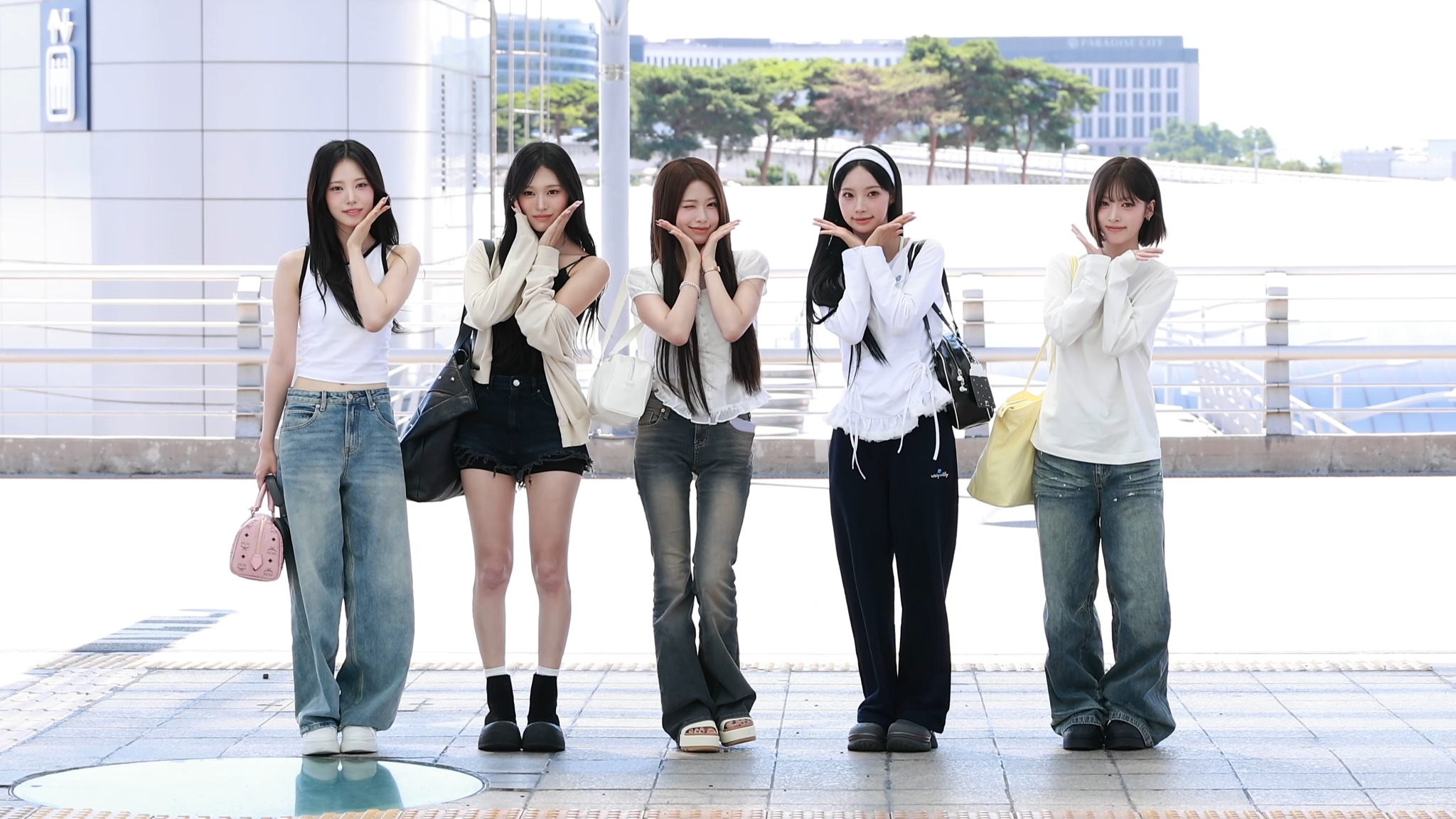
- Rescene in August 2026; L–R: Liv, Minami, Zena, Woni, and May

Background information
- Origin: Seoul, South Korea
- Genre: K-pop
- Years active: 2024–present
- Label: The Muze
- Members: Woni; Liv; Minami; May; Zena

Rescene (Korean: 리센느; stylized in all caps) is a South Korean girl group formed by The Muze Entertainment. The group is composed of five members: Woni, Liv, Minami, May, and Zena. The group officially debuted on March 26, 2024, with their single album Re:Scene.

== Name ==
Rescene's name is a combination of the prefix re- with the words scene and scent based on their concept of "recalling a scene through scent".

== History ==
=== 2021–2023: Pre-debut activities ===
Minami participated in the MBC reality competition series My Teenage Girl in 2021 and reached the finale, eventually finishing in 13th place and, therefore, did not become a member of the winning girl group, Classy. Zena had previously been a contestant on the Channel A reality competition series Stars Awakening in 2022 and worked as a visual model for the virtual K-pop girl group Mave: while in middle school.

=== 2024–2025: Re:Scene, Scenedrome, Glow Up, Dearest, and Lip Bomb ===
In February 2024, The Muze Entertainment announced that they would be debuting Rescene, the label's first girl group. It consists of members Woni, Minami, Liv, May, and Zena. Rescene's pre-debut single "Yoyo" was released on February 29. Rescene released their debut single album, Re:Scene, on March 26, which included "YoYo" and the album's lead single "Uhuh", the latter of which was released with a music video. The group released their first extended play titled Scenedrome on August 27, led by the single "Love Attack". Rescene released the Japanese version of "Uhuh" on December 4. On December 19, the group's song "Love Attack" was named one of the 10 K-pop songs that "electrified" 2024 by the Grammy Awards.

The group released their second extended play titled Glow Up on February 5, 2025, along with the lead single of the same name. The song ranked 24th on Billboard's list of the best K-pop songs released in the first half of 2025. Rescene's second single album, Dearest, was released on July 2, and consisted of two tracks: the lead single "Deja Vu" and the B-side "Mood". The group released their third extended play Lip Bomb on November 25, with one of the album's tracks, "Heart Drop" pre-released on November 6.

=== 2026–present: Runaway, Pretty Girl, and Pulse ===
Rescene released their first digital single "Runaway" on April 8, 2026. In May 2026, "Love Attack", from their 2024 extended play, Scenedrome, experienced a resurgence in popularity after Woni's personal YouTube channel "Hello, I'm Woni. Nice to Meet You" gained viral attention on social media. Several other singles from the group also experienced resurgences, following "Love Attack". The group released a digital single, a remake of Kara's "Pretty Girl", on July 8. Through this release, the group took their first music show win on The Show on July 14. On July 26, "Love Attack" got its first music show win on Inkigayo, despite being released almost two years before. The group released their fourth extended play titled Pulse, with the lead single "With" on November 3.

== Ambassadorship ==
On May 23, 2026, the city of Geoje appointed Rescene as its promotional ambassador. On June 25, the city of Suwon appointed the group as its promotional ambassador. On June 29, the city of Gyeongju appointed the group as its promotional ambassador. On July 3, the city of Goyang appointed the group as its promotional ambassador.

== Members ==
- Woni (원이)
- Liv (리브)
- Minami (미나미)
- May (메이)
- Zena (제나)

== Discography ==
=== Extended plays ===
List of extended plays, showing selected details, selected chart positions, and sales figures
Title	Details	Peak chart positions		Sales
Title	Details	KOR	JPN Hot	Sales
Scenedrome	Released: August 27, 2024; Label: The Muze; Formats: CD, digital download, streaming; Track listing: 1. "Lucky You"; 2. "Love Attack"; 3. "New World"; 4. "Pinball"	12	—	KOR: 31,205
Glow Up	Released: February 5, 2025; Label: The Muze; Formats: CD, digital download, streaming; Track listing: 1. "Crash"; 2. "Glow Up"; 3. "Going On"; 4. "In My Lotion"; 5. "Cotton Candy"	10	—	KOR: 15,612
Lip Bomb	Released: November 25, 2025; Label: The Muze; Formats: CD, digital download, streaming; Track listing: 1. "Heart Drop"; 2. "Bloom"; 3. "Love Echo"; 4. "Hello XO"; 5. "MVP"	4	—	KOR: 101,291
Pulse	Released: November 3, 2026; Label: The Muze; Formats: CD, digital download, streaming; Track listing: 1. "Finest Thing"; 2. "With"; 3. "Inside Out" (백화요란); 4. "Meme"; 5. "Dragon"	3	70	KOR: 535,477

=== Single albums ===
List of albums, showing selected details, selected chart positions, and sales figures
Title	Details	Peak chart positions	Sales
Title	Details	KOR	Sales
Re:Scene	Released: March 26, 2024; Label: The Muze; Formats: CD, digital download, streaming; Track listing: 1. "Yoyo"; 2. "Uhuh"	15	KOR: 33,627
Dearest	Released: July 2, 2025; Label: The Muze; Formats: CD, digital download, streaming; Track listing: 1. "Deja Vu"; 2. "Mood"	8	KOR: 83,919

=== Singles ===
List of singles, showing year released, selected chart positions, and name of the album
Title	Year	Peak chart positions				Album
Title	Year	KOR	CHN KOR	TWN	WW	Album
"Yoyo"	2024	— (Note: "Yoyo" did not enter the Circle Digital Chart, but peaked at number 160 on the Circle Download Chart.)	—	—	—	Re:Scene
"Uhuh"	2024	— (Note: "Uhuh" did not enter the Circle Digital Chart, but peaked at number 139 on the Circle Download Chart.)	—	—	—	Re:Scene
"Love Attack"	2024	1	—	—	— (Note: "Love Attack" did not enter the Billboard Global 200, but peaked at number 167 on the Billboard Global Excl. US chart.)	Scenedrome
"Pinball"	2024	38	—	—	—	Scenedrome
"Glow Up"	2025	— (Note: "Glow Up" did not enter the Circle Digital Chart, but peaked at number 25 on the Circle Download Chart.)	—	—	—	Glow Up
"Deja Vu"	2025	4	—	—	—	Dearest
"Heart Drop"	2025	— (Note: "Heart Drop" did not enter the Circle Digital Chart, but peaked at number 87 on the Circle Download Chart.)	—	—	—	Lip Bomb
"Bloom"	2025	— (Note: "Bloom" did not enter the Circle Digital Chart, but peaked at number 42 on the Circle Download Chart.)	—	—	—	Lip Bomb
"Busy Boy" (Note: Released as part of the special digital single [Rescene x ???].)	2026	— (Note: "Busy Boy" did not enter the Circle Digital Chart, but peaked at number 83 on the Circle Download Chart.)	—	—	—	Non-album singles
"Runaway"	2026	29	89	—	—	Non-album singles
"Pretty Girl"	2026	5	—	—	—	Non-album singles
"With"	2026	1	18	8	58	Pulse
"—" denotes a recording that did not chart or was not released in that territory

=== Other appearances ===
List of non-single guest appearances, showing year released, selected chart positions, and name of the album
Title	Year	Peak chart positions	Album
Title	Year	KOR	Album
"Counting Star"	2024	—	Counting Star (The Magic Star X Rescene)
"BamBamBam"	2025	— (Note: "BamBamBam" did not enter the Circle Digital Chart, but peaked at number 51 and 130 on the Circle BGM Chart and the Circle Download Chart, respectively.)	The First Night with the Duke OST
"Love Frequency"	2025	— (Note: "Love Frequency" did not enter the Circle Digital Chart, but peaked at number 189 on the Circle BGM Chart)	Just for Meeting You OST
"Higher"	2026	—	Music from The Specials
"—" denotes a recording that did not chart or was not released in that territory

=== Other charted songs ===
List of other charted songs, showing year released, selected chart positions, and name of the album
Title	Year	Peak chart positions		Album
Title	Year	KOR	WW Excl. US	Album
"Finest Thing"	2026	15	—	Pulse
"Inside Out" (백화요란)	2026	8	121	Pulse
"Meme"	2026	20	—	Pulse
"Dragon"	2026	22	—	Pulse
"—" denotes a recording that did not chart or was not released in that territory

== Videography ==
=== Music videos ===
List of music videos, showing year released, and name of the director(s)
Title	Year	Director(s)	Ref.
"Yoyo"	2024	Soze (Studio Gaze)	
"Uhuh"	2024	Mingyu Kang (SL8)	
"Love Attack"	2024	Sung Kyuho (Ambience)	
"New World"	2024	Ianxson (Ambience)	
"Pinball"	2024	Yunah Sheep (Ambience)	
"Glow Up"	2025	HeadHead (Ambience)	
"Deja Vu"	2025	Yunah Sheep (Ambience)	
"Mood: The Film"	2025	Unknown	
"Deja Vu" (MV Dream ver.)	2025	Lee Seunggun	
"Heart Drop"	2025	Daehee Han	
"Bloom"	2025	Kim Nany	
"Pinball" (Japanese ver.)	2026	Unknown	
"Runaway"	2026	Min Soo Park (Souvenir Media)	
"Pretty Girl"	2026	Hong Seok Zoo	
"With"	2026	Yunah Sheep (Ambience)	

=== Web shows ===
Web shows appearances
Year	Title	Notes	Ref.
2025	Re:Creation	Weekly variety shows; premiered on June 5, 2025	

== Accolades ==
=== Awards and nominations ===
Name of the award ceremony, year presented, category, nominee of the award, and the result of the nomination
Award ceremony	Year	Category	Nominee / Work	Result	Ref.
Asia Artist Awards	2024	Popularity Award – Idol Group (Female)	Rescene	Nominated	
Asia Model Awards	2024	Rising Star Award (Singer)	Rescene	Won	
The Fact Music Awards	2026	Artist of the Year (Bonsang)	Rescene	Won	
The Fact Music Awards	2026	Today's Choice	Rescene	Won	
Hanteo Music Awards	2025	Rookie of the Year – Female	Rescene	Nominated	
Korea First Brand Awards	2026	Rising Female Idol	Rescene	Won	
Korea Grand Music Awards	2026	Grand Honor's Choice (Daesang)	Rescene	Won	
Korea Grand Music Awards	2026	Best Artist	Rescene	Won	
Korea Grand Music Awards	2026	Best Memory	Rescene	Won	
Korea Grand Music Awards	2026	Global Fan Choice	Rescene	Won	
K-World Dream Awards	2026	K-World Dream Best Visual Content	Rescene	Won	
K-World Dream Awards	2026	K-World Dream Best Fandom	Rescene	Won	
MAMA Awards	2026	Top 10 Fans' Choice – Female	Rescene	Pending	
Melon Music Awards	2026	Global Top 10	Rescene	Won	
Melon Music Awards	2026	Hot Trend	Rescene	Won	
Melon Music Awards	2026	Kakao Bank Everyone's Star	Rescene	Won	
SPOTV K-Pop Awards	2026	Global Connect	Rescene	Won	
SPOTV K-Pop Awards	2026	SPOTV Ambassador	Rescene	Won	

=== State and cultural honors ===
Name of country or organization, year given, and name of honor
Country or organization	Year	Honor	Ref.
Newsis K-Expo Cultural Awards (Note: Co-sponsored by Korea's Ministry of Culture, Sports and Tourism, Ministry of Trade, Industry, and Energy, Korea Communications Commission, and Korea Creative Content Agency, it awards cultural icons and businesses that promote the sustainability of the Korean Wave and boost the industry's competitiveness.)	2025	Hallyu Special Award	
