= Show K-Pop =

South Korean television program

- Logo used since 2026
- Genre: Music
- Presented by: Seok Matthew
- Country of origin: South Korea
- Original languages: Korean; English
- No. of episodes: 5

Production
- Executive producer: Kim Hyun-young
- Producers: Min In-ji; Park Ye-in; Kang Keun-young; Son Ye-hyun
- Production location: Arirang Tower
- Production company: Arirang TV

Original release
- Network: Arirang TV
- Release: October 19, 2026 – present

Show K-Pop is a South Korean music television program broadcast by Arirang TV. It airs live every Monday at 6 PM KST and is broadcast from the Arirang Tower in Seocho-gu, Seoul, South Korea.

The show is broadcast live worldwide on Arirang TV's YouTube channel and on Arirang TV in South Korea. Currently hosted by Seok Matthew, the show is presented primarily in English.

== Chart system ==
Show K-Pop's chart system was introduced at the beginning of its run, which started on October 19, 2026 and was named Show K-Pop Chart.

Period covered	Chart system						Ref.
Period covered	Digital sales	Physical album	Social media	Broadcast	Pre-voting	Live voting	Ref.
October 19, 2026 – October 26, 2026	40%	10%	10%	10%	15%	15%	
November 2, 2026 – present	45%	10%	10%	5%	15%	15%	

Based source and explanations for each criterion:

- Digital sales: Number of streaming and download based on Circle Global K-pop Chart.
- Physical album: Number of copies based on Circle Album Chart
- Social media: Circle Social Chart
- Broadcast: Show K-Pop's attendance
- Pre-voting and Live voting: Voting number from Mubeat app.

== Show K-Pop Chart winner ==
=== 2026 ===
Chart history
Episode	Date	Artist	Song	Points	Ref.
1	October 19	Soyeon	"I'm Gonna Toesa"	6,314	
2	October 26	A2O Lite	"Neon"	5,388	
3	November 2	A2O Lite	"Neon"	7,139	
4	November 9	Illit	"You're Under Arrest"	7,957	
5	November 16	Illit	"You're Under Arrest"	7,891	

== Similar programs ==
- Mnet M Countdown
- SBS Inkigayo
- KBS Music Bank
- MBC Show! Music Core
- Arirang TV Pops in Seoul
- Arirang TV Simply K-Pop (formerly called The M-Wave and Wave K)
- JTBC Music on Top
- JTBC Music Universe K-909
- MBC M Show Champion

== See also ==
- Music programs of South Korea
