= Crown (Exo song) =

Single by Exo

from the album Reverxe
- Language: Korean; English
- Released: January 19, 2026
- Studio: SM Big Shot (Seoul); SM Wavelet (Seoul); SM Yellow Tail (Seoul)
- Genre: Dance-pop
- Length: 3:18
- Label: SM; Kakao
- Composers: Adrian McKinnon; Ninos Hanna; Fabian Zeke; Kyle Buckley
- Lyricists: Kang Eun-jeong; Yoon (153/Joombas)
- Producer: Pink Slip

Exo singles chronology
"Cream Soda" (2023)	"Crown" (2026)

Music video
- "Crown" on YouTube

"Crown" is a song by South Korean-Chinese boy band Exo for their eight studio album Reverxe. It was released as the album's title track on January 19, 2026, by SM Entertainment. The track marks the group's first release in over two and a half years and features member Lay, following the completion of all members' mandatory military service obligations.

== Background and release ==
Following the military discharge of Exo members Kai and Sehun, also Lay's return to the group in 2025, SM Entertainment began a multi-stage rollout for the group's return. A cinematic trailer titled "Reverxe" was released on December 8, 2025, which re-established the group's concept. The song was first previewed during the "Exo'verse" fan meeting on December 14 at the Inspire Arena. From January 15 to 16, 2026, a set of individual and group teaser images was released on Exo's official social media accounts with the caption "Crown". The music video teaser for "Crown" was released on January 18. "Crown" was officially released in conjunction with the album on January 19, 2026.

== Composition ==
"Crown" was composed by Adrian McKinnon, Ninos Hanna, Fabian Zeke, and Kyle Buckley with arrangement by Buckley under his stage name Pink Slip. Produced in the key E Minor, with a tempo of 160 BPM, it is characterized as a hard dance-pop song that incorporates elements of Atlanta trap drumming, heavy metal guitar, and EDM synthesizers. It utilizes siren sound effects and builds tension through the group's vocal delivery. The lyrics written by Kang Eun-jeong and Yoon employs the titular object as a metaphor for a precious entity, focusing on themes of commitment and protection.

== Music video ==
The music video for "Crown" premiered on January 19, 2026, in conjunction with the single's release. The video's narrative utilizes fantasy elements to portray the group's return, specifically focusing on the concept of "regression", a thematic transition where the members move from an established past to the creation of a "new world". Visually, the production emphasizes a "royalty" motif through the use of high-fashion costuming and cinematic set designs. The video integrates the group's fictional supernatural powers into both the plot and choreography, expanding on the "Exo Planet" lore established in their prior work. Commentators noted that the video serves as a visual representation of the album title, Reverxe, by referencing aesthetic motifs and world-building elements from the group's debut era.

== Critical reception ==
Professional ratings
Review scores
Source	Rating
IZM	1.5/5 stars

Lim Dong-yeop of IZM gave "Crown" a lukewarm review, describing the track's blend of Atlanta trap, heavy metal guitar, and EDM synths as "complex and frantic". While Lim noted that the "powerful sound" effectively filled the void left by absent members and the group's hiatus, he argued that the production lacked a central "melodic charm" to anchor the "abrasive" arrangement. The review concluded that while the song succeeded as an "impressive comeback" piece, it fell short of "artistic merit," with both the group's "new world and past glory" vanishing alongside the music.

== Accolades ==
Exo achieved a grand slam with "Crown" despite not appearing on the music programs for live performances.

Music program awards for "Crown"
Program	Date	Ref.
Show Champion	January 28, 2026	
M Countdown	January 29, 2026	
Music Bank	January 30, 2026	
Show! Music Core	January 31, 2026	
Inkigayo	February 1, 2026	

== Credits and personnel ==
Credits adapted from the album's liner notes.

Studio

- SM Big Shot Studio – recording, additional digital editing
- SM Yellow Tail Studio – recording, digital editing
- SM Wavelet Studio – recording
- SM Concert Hall Studio – mixing
- 821 Sound – mastering

Personnel

- SM Entertainment – executive producer
- Exo – vocals
  - Chanyeol – background vocals
- Kang Eun-jeong – lyrics
- Yoon (153/Joombas) – lyrics
- Adrian McKinnon – composition, background vocals
- Ninos Hanna – composition
- Fabian Zeke – composition
- Kyle Buckley a.k.a. Pink Slip – producer, composition, arrangement
- Kriz – vocal directing
- Hyun – background vocals
- PIT300 – background vocals
- Lee Min-kyu – recording, additional digital editing
- Noh Min-ji – recording, digital editing
- Kang Eun-ji – recording
- Nam Koong-jin – mixing
- Kwon Nam-woo – mastering

== Charts ==
=== Weekly charts ===
Weekly chart performance for "Crown"
Chart (2026)	Peak position
China (TME Korean)	1
South Korea (Circle)	29
South Korea Hot 100 (Billboard)	17

=== Monthly charts ===
Monthly chart performance for "Crown"
Chart (2026)	Position
South Korea (Circle)	141

== Release history ==
Release history for "Crown"
Region	Date	Format	Label
Various	January 19, 2026	Digital download; streaming	SM; Kakao
