= Music programs of South Korea =

Music programs of South Korea are broadcast weekly, with different artists performing on the shows to promote their music.

South Korea's largest broadcasting companies each have their own show, which are broadcast on different channels. SBS has Inkigayo, KBS has Music Bank, MBC has Show! Music Core, Mnet has M Countdown and MBC M has Show Champion.

== Music programs ==
=== Current ===
- Inkigayo or The Music Trend (previously known as SBS Popular Song) airs on SBS every Sunday. It is currently hosted by EJ of &Team, Shinyu of TWS, and Yihyun of Baby Dont Cry.
- The Show is a music program that airs on SBS Life every Tuesday. It is currently hosted by Minjae of Xikers and Chuei Liyu of Flare U
- Show Champion airs on MBC M every Wednesday. It is currently hosted by Minwook and Yeojun of Close Your Eyes.
- M Countdown airs on Mnet every Thursday. Currently, the MCs are Zerobasone's Park Gunwook, KickFlip's Kyehoon and TREASURE's So Junghwan.
- Music Bank airs on KBS2 and KBS World every Friday. It is currently hosted by Bang Jeemin of izna and actor Kim Jae Won
- Show! Music Core airs on MBC every Saturday. It is currently hosted by Dohoon of TWS, Gyuvin of And2ble.
- Simply K-Pop airs on Arirang TV every Friday. It is the only South Korean music program that has never had a chart system. It is also an English-language South Korean music show. It is currently hosted by Lee Dae-hwi from AB6IX.
- Show K-Pop airs on Arirang TV every Monday. It is an English-language music show and is hosted by Zerobaseone's Seok Matthew. Unlike Simply K-Pop, it has a charting system.

=== Past music programs ===
- Gayo Top 10 was previously aired on KBS from February 10, 1981 to February 11, 1998. Its popularity in South Korea was unrivaled, since it was airing at a time when cable television and the internet wasn't as developed. It was revived on March 25, 2022 as Virtual Gayo Top 10 and was aired on KBS World hosted by AleXa. It had a song ranking system similar to Music Bank which replaced Bravo New Generation, a music program originally intended to be the show's replacement but stopped airing only after a few months.
- Show Network was a song ranking program which aired on MBC from October 30, 1989, to November 9, 1990, when the station decided to change its name to a Korean one, which eventually became 여러분의 인기가요, or Everyone's Popular Songs.
- Everyone's Popular Songs aired on MBC from November 9, 1990, to April 30, 1993. It was replaced by Choice! Most Popular Songs which ended in the same year.
- Live TV Gayo 20 replaced Inkigayo or SBS Popular Song in 1994 and aired until 1998, when SBS revived Inkigayo.
- Popular Songs Best 50 began airing on MBC on April 21, 1995, and lasted until January 17, 1998, when it was cancelled due to high production cost caused by the IMF crisis in 1997.
- Show! Music Tank was the longest-running music program aired on the cable music channel KMTV Asia for 13 years (from March 11, 1995, to May 29, 2008).
- Live Young Times was a music show with a chart system that aired on MBC from January to April 1998, but was replaced by Music Camp.
- Music Camp was a music program that aired on MBC, but was cancelled after an incident that was broadcast live where two band members exposed their genitalia during a segment of the show.
- K-PopCon was a music program that aired on Channel A between December 2011 and March 2012.
- Music on Top was a music program that aired on JTBC, but was cancelled due to low ratings. Like most music programs, it also had a chart system that awarded music show wins to artists every week.
- Pops in Seoul was a music program that aired on Arirang TV from 1998 to March 31, 2021. The show never had a chart system.
- Music Universe K-909 was a music program that aired on JTBC from September 24, 2022 to July 22, 2023. It was hosted by soloist BoA.

== Performances ==
Artists commonly pre-record performances and appear live on the show for interviews and the ending of the show, where the week's winning artist is announced. For all music shows, artists accumulate points from the previous week for them to be nominated for first place in the next.

They also use music programs to promote. 'Debut stage' is the term used for artists who perform on the shows for the first time, usually serving as their first live performance when they debut as an artist. On the other hand, a 'comeback stage' is the term used for the first performance of the artist on the shows with their new songs and the start of a new promotional cycle, after the end of their debut cycle.

Fans are also allowed to attend pre-recordings and live shows to support the artists for free if they apply for tickets on each of the show's websites, with the condition that they do not record or take photos during the recording. In August 2013, fans of Exo were indefinitely banned from future Inkigayo recordings for ignoring rules and staff directions.

=== Show! Music Core lip-sync ban ===
In an interview with Newsen in July 2014, Music Core's chief producer, Park Hyun Suk, said that the show would "not allow people who are not equipped with the basics as a singer to perform on stage. Even if one's individual part is short, that is fine. The singers who perform on stage must sing." The measure was enacted to discourage entertainment agencies and producers who pushed "for performances that merely look[ed] good" and to "prevent singers from cheating".

== Chart systems ==
A crucial element of each music program in South Korea is that every program has a voting system. Each program has different ways to count the votes and decide the winning artist of the week, so the possibilities of an artist winning is different for every program. Billboard reasoned that it is so that the music show scene "doesn't feel static", wherein the result would be the same for each show. While most programs prioritize digital sales, they differ in other areas such as SNS points, physical sales, broadcast points, live votes, etc. For instance, for some time, Music Bank's K-Chart included the song's physical sales in their computation, while SBS' Inkigayo's chart did not. Because an artist must accumulate points during the first week of promotions, they are not eligible to win on music shows in first week and may only be included in the music charts since and include the second week.

Paul Han, who is a co-owner of the English-language K-pop blog Allkpop claims that it is gratifying for dedicated fans of these artists to watch these music shows when their favorite artists win because of the presence of an actual trophy and an encore stage. Han said that "It's just much more satisfactory to receive a big trophy with all of your peers around. In a way, it's sort of like a mini-music award show every week, and only one can be the winner".

Music program	Channel	Day	Chart system	Condition to be ranked
The Show	SBS FunE (formerly SBS M)	Tuesday	Pre-score: Total 90% (Digital (downloads and streaming) (40%), album sales (10%), music video views (20%), broadcast (15%), Starpass pre-voting (5%)); For The Show Choice nominees only: Starpass live voting 10%	Attend on broadcast date. Exception: Loona on July 13, 2021, due to COVID-19 quarantine.
Show Champion	MBC M (formerly MBC Music)	Wednesday	Digital (streaming + downloads) (35%) + Album sales (15%), Pre-voting (Idol Champ) (20%), broadcast score (20%), SNS (10%)	As long as this songs in vote list. Songs that have already got triple crown are not eligible
M Countdown	Mnet	Thursday	Digital (streaming + downloads) (45%), album sales (15%), music video views (15%), Pre-voting (a sum of pre-votes on Mwave, Whosfan, Mnet and Mnet Japan) (15%), broadcast score (10%), live text voting (10%) (weekly 1st place chart nominees only)	Must promote for at least one music show in either that week or the weeks before. Songs that have already got triple crown are not eligible
Music Bank	KBS	Friday	Digital (streaming + downloads) (65%), album sales (5%), KBS broadcast score (KBS2 (TV) and KBS Cool FM and KBS Happy FM (radio)) (20%), panel survey (10%)	Top 200 of at least one of five charts that Music Bank use
Show! Music Core	MBC	Saturday	Pre-score: Total 90% (Digital Sales 50%, Album Sales 10%, Music Video Views 10%, Viewers Committee Pre-voting (by 2,000 people) 5%, MBC Radio Broadcast 10%, Global Fans Vote 5%); For 1st place nominees only: Mubeat live voting 5%. Audience Live Voting 5%	New songs within two months, since release date (example: If a song released at 2 January then it will be not eligible after 2 March). Songs that have already got quintuple crown are not eligible
Inkigayo	SBS	Sunday	Digital (streaming + downloads) (55%), SNS (YouTube views) (30%), album sales (10%), advance viewer votes (5%), On-Air (10%), live-vote (5%; for 1st place nominees only)	Songs that have already got triple crown are not eligible. Digital requirements is currently unknown

- Show! Music Core broadcast for over seven years without a chart system from December 31, 2005, before it was brought back on April 20, 2013. It was once again removed on November 21, 2015. On April 22, 2017, the chart system was brought back yet again.
- Inkigayo revamped the show on July 15, 2012, without the chart system but revived it again on March 17, 2013.
- The Show broadcast for over three years before it introduced a chart system on October 28, 2014.
- Show Champion started broadcasting on February 21, 2012.
- Music Bank has been airing since June 16, 1998. The last winner was on August 2, 2001, before the chart system was abandoned. It was revived again on September 7, 2007.
- M Countdown has been airing since July 29, 2004 and has always had a chart system.

=== Chart records ===
In 2012, Psy's "Gangnam Style" won on Music Bank for a record ten consecutive weeks, surpassing the previous record of nine consecutive wins by Girls' Generation's "Gee" in 2009.

In September 2015, Girls' Generation became the first artist in South Korea to accumulate a total of 100 wins on music shows.

BTS currently holds the record for most awarded song with "Dynamite", released in August 2020. The song won the first-place award for a total of 32 times. The group also holds the record for the most first-place wins in a year as they won a total of 50 times, and won on Show! Music Core for a record 16 consecutive weeks (10 with Dynamite and 6 with Life Goes On) in 2020.

== International impact ==
According to Caitlin Kelley of Billboard, South Korean music shows have incorporated international participation through social networking sites such as YouTube, which has been integrated into their voting system with the views of an artist's music video. She also credits these music shows for their participation in the globalization of K-pop. Every music program has its own regularly updated YouTube account, which allows persons outside of South Korea the opportunity to view the artists' performance, thereby offering a larger exposure of K-pop acts to other parts of the world. In a 2018 interview with Billboard, Korean culture scholar Suk-Young Kim claimed that "YouTube is how you circulate yourself internationally" but outside of the website, South Korean music had already reached overseas fans directly by "bringing those music chart shows overseas and creating a live concert out of them", citing Music Bank which has gone on world tours since 2011 as an example. Kim also mentioned KCON, a music festival organized by M Countdown, as a means to showcase "every element of Hallyu encompassing pop music, TV dramas, movies, fashion, food, and beauty".
