= A2O Lite =

South Korean girl group

- A2O Lite in 2026; From left to right: Rada, Vora, Xili, Young, Oa, Ayune, Aijing, Merci, and Himeki

Background information
- Origin: South Korea
- Genre: K-pop
- Years active: 2026–present
- Label: A2O Entertainment
- Members: Young; Himeki; Vora; Xili; Rada; Merci; Ayune; Oa; Aijing

A2O Lite (Korean: 에이투오 라이트) is a South Korean girl group formed by A2O Entertainment. The group consists of nine members: Young, Himeki, Vora, Xili, Rada, Merci, Ayune, Oa, and Aijing. They debuted on October 13, 2026, with the single "Neon", which topped the Circle Digital Chart and reached the top 10 on the Billboard Global 200.

== History ==
A2O Lite was formed by A2O Entertainment, a company established in 2024 by the South Korean record producer Lee Soo-man. The previous year, Lee had sold his stake in SM Entertainment—the agency he founded in 1989 and built into one of South Korea's largest entertainment companies, where he pioneered the K-pop idol system—to Hybe. As part of the deal, Lee had signed a three-year non-compete agreement that prevented him from participating in any entertainment business activities within the country until February 2026. Consequently, A2O Entertainment focused on other markets such as China and the United States, officially unveiling its first group of trainees, A2O Rookies, through performance videos in October 2024; the lineup included some of the future members of A2O Lite.

On October 8, 2026, A2O Entertainment launched official social media accounts for its first K-pop girl group, A2O Lite, and boy group, A2O Soul. The agency announced that both groups would be introduced at a joint showcase, Welcome to Soulite From A2O Soul A2O Lite, held at the Korea International Exhibition Center on October 12, followed by the simultaneous release of their first singles on October 13. Some publications, such as the JoongAng Ilbo and Kyunghyang Shinmun, described the simultaneous launch of two groups as an uncommon strategy in the industry.

At the showcase, A2O Lite debuted with a nine-member lineup from five countries: Young, Vora, and Ayune from South Korea; Himeki from Japan; Xili, Merci, and Aijing from China; Rada from Thailand; and Oa, who holds dual US and Japanese citizenship. Ahead of its official release, Mnet broadcast the group's first performance of their debut single, "Neon", recorded at the event. The video surpassed two million views on YouTube within a day, with the song's hook "neon and beyond" going viral. Users created AI parody videos of its intro and drew comparisons between Oa and the former Girls' Generation member Jessica Jung, as well as Aijing and the South Korean singer BoA. "Neon" reached number one on Melon's Top 100, the real-time chart of one of the largest music streaming services in South Korea, 29 hours after its release, making it the fastest debut song by a rookie group to top the chart since its revamp in 2021. It subsequently debuted at number one on the country's Circle Digital Chart. Some publications attributed the song's positive reception to its revival of elements associated with earlier K-pop music, but others criticized the sound as "dated". Since all members debuted as minors, with the youngest being 13 years old, their ages sparked debate over the adequacy of South Korea's protections for child performers.

== Artistry ==
=== Concept and image ===
Official logo

A2O Entertainment presented A2O Lite as a girl group where each member is connected to "unique colors shaped by their memories and emotions" that "blend to create new hues". The group's name combines the abbreviation of "alpha to omega", using the first and last letter of the Greek alphabet to symbolize a complete and continuous journey, and the word lite, representing light and lightness. Connected through a fictional storyline, the group and A2O Soul share a fictional universe called the A2O Cosmic Epic set on Soulite, described as "a planet with abundant resources where residents can have anything they want", yet human emotions such as "love" and "excitement" are gradually fading away. The concept allows for future collaborations on stage, the formation of new sub-units, or solo activities.

In early teaser images, the members were dressed in matching light blue outfits with objects reminiscent of robotic animals resting on their heads and shoulders. Harper's Bazaar Korea commented that the combination of "a bright, refreshing, girl-next-door aesthetic with cold, futuristic elements aligns seamlessly with the narrative that they are beings from beyond Earth". The Korea JoongAng Daily remarked that A2O Lite's coordinated stage outfits and "powerful" choreography resembled earlier K-pop acts, with Ten Asia adding that the group emphasized synchronization on stage.

=== Musical style and influences ===
A2O Lite's music was branded as "zalpha pop"—a term coined by Lee to describe music aimed at Generation Z and Generation Alpha. Written by Lee's longtime collaborators Yoo Young-jin and Dem Jointz, "Neon" was described as a dance-pop track driven by a "heavy, resonant" bass and the hook "neon and beyond". Several publications noted that the song incorporated elements characteristic of earlier K-pop music such as a bridge, high notes, a cappella sections, a dance break, and a longer runtime. In particular, it drew comparisons to past SM productions due to the a cappella harmonies, densely layered vocals, and "futuristic" AutoTune effects, with its "dramatic" structure being likened to the music of Girls' Generation and f(x) for the "electronic production and late-song climax".

== Members ==
- Young (영)
- Himeki (히메키)
- Vora (보라)
- Xili (시리)
- Rada (라다)
- Merci (메르시)
- Ayune (아윤)
- Oa (오아)
- Aijing (아이찡)

== Discography ==
=== Singles ===
List of singles, with year of release, selected chart positions, and associated album
Title	Year	Peak chart positions									Album
Title	Year	KOR	HK	JPN Cmb.	JPN Hot	MLY	NZ Hot	SGP	TWN	WW	Album
"Neon"	2026	1	1	16	9	3	14	2	1	8	Non-album single
