= 2018 MBC Entertainment Awards =

18th edition of award ceremony

- Date: December 29, 2018
- Site: MBC Public Hall, Sangam-dong, Mapo-gu, Seoul
- Hosted by: Jun Hyun-moo; Seungri; Lee Hye-ri

Television coverage
- Network: MBC
- Duration: 220 minutes
- Ratings: 14.4% (Part 1); 18.3% (Part 2)

The 2018 MBC Entertainment Awards presented by Munhwa Broadcasting Corporation (MBC), took place on December 29, 2018 at MBC Public Hall in Sangam-dong, Mapo-gu, Seoul. It was hosted by Jun Hyun-moo, Seungri and Lee Hye-ri.

== Nominations and winners ==
(Winners denoted in bold)

Grand Prize (Daesang)		Program of the Year
**Lee Young-ja** – **Omniscient Interfering View**; Kim Gu-ra – King of Mask Singer, Radio Star, Talk Nomad – Give Generously, Those Who Cross the Line; Jun Hyun-moo – I Live Alone, Omniscient Interfering View, Unexpected Q; Park Na-rae – I Live Alone		**I Live Alone**; King of Mask Singer; Omniscient Interfering View; Radio Star
Top Excellence Award
Variety Category	Music/Talk Category	Radio Category
Male	**Yoon Jong-shin** – **Radio Star**; Eun Ji-won – Unexpected Q; Kim Gook-jin – Radio Star; Lee Soo-geun – Unexpected Q	**Kim Shin-young** – **Kim Shin-young's Noon Song of Hope**
**Cha In-pyo** – **Curious Husband's Get Away**; **Lee Si-eon** – **I Live Alone**; Kim Yong-man – Curious Husband's Get Away; Yang Se-hyung – Omniscient Interfering View	**Yoon Jong-shin** – **Radio Star**; Eun Ji-won – Unexpected Q; Kim Gook-jin – Radio Star; Lee Soo-geun – Unexpected Q	**Kim Shin-young** – **Kim Shin-young's Noon Song of Hope**
Female	**Yoon Jong-shin** – **Radio Star**; Eun Ji-won – Unexpected Q; Kim Gook-jin – Radio Star; Lee Soo-geun – Unexpected Q	**Kim Shin-young** – **Kim Shin-young's Noon Song of Hope**
**Han Hye-jin** – **I Live Alone**; **Song Eun-i** – **Omniscient Interfering View**; Lee Si-young – Those Who Cross the Line; Oh Hyun-kyung – Living Together in Empty Room	**Yoon Jong-shin** – **Radio Star**; Eun Ji-won – Unexpected Q; Kim Gook-jin – Radio Star; Lee Soo-geun – Unexpected Q	**Kim Shin-young** – **Kim Shin-young's Noon Song of Hope**
Excellence Award
Variety Category	Music/Talk Category	Radio Category
Male		**Jung Seon-hee** – **Jung Seon-hee & Moon Cheon-sik's Now is the Era of Radio**; **Kim Je-dong** – **Good Morning FM, It's Kim Je-dong**
**Kian84** – **I Live Alone**; **Park Sung-kwang** – **Omniscient Interfering View**; Kwon Oh-joong – Curious Husband's Get Away; Yoo Byung-jae – Omniscient Interfering View, Those Who Cross the Line	**Cha Tae-hyun** – **Radio Star**; Lee Sang-min – Section TV, Cafeteria; Shin Dong-wook – Dae Jang Geum Is Watching; Yoo Se-yoon – Unexpected Q	**Jung Seon-hee** – **Jung Seon-hee & Moon Cheon-sik's Now is the Era of Radio**; **Kim Je-dong** – **Good Morning FM, It's Kim Je-dong**
Female		**Jung Seon-hee** – **Jung Seon-hee & Moon Cheon-sik's Now is the Era of Radio**; **Kim Je-dong** – **Good Morning FM, It's Kim Je-dong**
**Kim Jae-hwa** – Real Man 300; Choi Jung-won – Living Together in Empty Room; Jung Hye-sung – Dunia: Into a New World; Oh Yoon-ah – Real Man 300	**Kim So-hyun** – **Under Nineteen**; Kwon Yu-ri – Dae Jang Geum Is Watching; Seol In-ah – Section TV; Shin Bong-sun – King of Mask Singer	**Jung Seon-hee** – **Jung Seon-hee & Moon Cheon-sik's Now is the Era of Radio**; **Kim Je-dong** – **Good Morning FM, It's Kim Je-dong**
Rookie Award
Variety Category	Music/Talk Category	Radio Category
Male		**Ahn Young-mi** and **Choi Wook** – **Ahn Young-mi, Choi Wook's Eheradio**; **Yang Yo-seob** – **Yang Yoseob's Dreaming Radio**
**Gamst** – **Real Man 300**; **Kang Daniel** – **It's Dangerous Beyond the Blankets**; Matthew Douma – Real Man 300; Jo Tae-kwan – Curious Husband's Get Away; Sung Hoon – I Live Alone	**Seungkwan** – **King of Mask Singer**, **Unexpected Q**; Kim Ho-young – King of Mask Singer, Real Man 300; Kim Jeong-hyun – Section TV; Lee Dong-jin – Talk Nomad – Give Generously; Mark – Show! Music Core	**Ahn Young-mi** and **Choi Wook** – **Ahn Young-mi, Choi Wook's Eheradio**; **Yang Yo-seob** – **Yang Yoseob's Dreaming Radio**
Female		**Ahn Young-mi** and **Choi Wook** – **Ahn Young-mi, Choi Wook's Eheradio**; **Yang Yo-seob** – **Yang Yoseob's Dreaming Radio**
**Hwasa** – **I Live Alone**; JooE – Real Man 300; Lee Yu-bi – Real Man 300; Luda – Dunia: Into a New World	**Mina** – **Show! Music Core**; Ahn Hyun-mo – Cafeteria; Gyeongree – Section TV; Lee Yeol-eum – Dae Jang Geum Is Watching	**Ahn Young-mi** and **Choi Wook** – **Ahn Young-mi, Choi Wook's Eheradio**; **Yang Yo-seob** – **Yang Yoseob's Dreaming Radio**
Popularity Award	Best Entertainer Award	PD's Award
**Im Song**, **Kang Hyun-seok**, **Song Sung-ho** and **Yoo Gyu-seon** managers – **Omniscient Interfering View**	**Shin Dong-wook** and **Kwon Yu-ri** – **Dae Jang Geum Is Watching** (Sitcom); **Lee Sang-min** – **Section TV**, **Cafeteria** (Music/Talk); **Sung Hoon** – **I Live Alone** (Variety); **Yoo Byung-jae** – **Omniscient Interfering View**, **Those Who Cross the Line** (Variety)	**Real Man 300 team**
Best Teamwork Award	MC Award	Achievement Award in Radio
**Curious Husband's Get Away team**	**Kim Sung-joo** – **King of Mask Singer**	**Korea District Heating Corporation**
Entertainer of the Year Award	Best Couple Award	Contribution Award
**Gim Gu-ra** – **King of Mask Singer**, **Radio Star**, **Talk Nomad – Give Generously**, **Those Who Cross the Line**; **Jun Hyun-moo** – **I Live Alone**, **Omniscient Interfering View**, **Unexpected Q**; **Lee Young-ja** – **Omniscient Interfering View**; **Park Na-rae** – **I Live Alone**	**Park Sung-kwang** and manager **Im Song** – **Omniscient Interfering View**; Cha In-pyo and Kim Yong-man – Curious Husband's Get Away; Lee Young-ja and manager Song Sung-ho – Omniscient Interfering View; Park Na-rae and Kian84 – I Live Alone; Park Na-rae and Kim Choong-jae – I Live Alone; Shin Dong-wook and Kwon Yu-ri – Dae Jang Geum Is Watching	**Republic of Korea Army**
Special Awards
Variety Category	Current Events Category	Radio Category
**Welcome, First Time in Korea? team**	**Lee Cheol-yong**; **Lee Jin**	**Jang Yong**; **Shin Chae-yi** reporter
Scriptwriter of the Year
Variety Category	Current Events Category	Radio Category
**Yeo Hyun-jeon** – **Omniscient Interfering View**	**Lee So-young**	**Kim Se-yoon – FM Film Music, It's Han Ye-ri**

== Presenters ==
Order	Presenter	Award	Ref.
1	Kwanghee, Mijoo	Rookie Award in Music/Talk Category	
2	Lee Young-ja, manager Song Sung-ho	Rookie Award in Variety Category	
3	Shin Dong-wook, Kwon Yu-ri	Top Excellence/Excellence/Rookie Award in Radio Category	
4	Lee Sang-min, Seol In-ah	Scriptwriter of the Year; PD's Award	
5	Park Na-rae, Kang Daniel	Special Award; MC Award	
6	Yoo Min-sang, Kim Jun-hyun	Best Couple Award	
7	Alberto Mondi, DinDin	Best Teamwork Award	
8	Song Eun-i, Kim Shin-young	Popularity Award	
9	Han Hye-jin, Kian84	Best Entertainer Award	
10	Jo Bin, JooE	Excellence Award in Music/Talk Category	
11	Lee Si-eon, Sung Hoon	Excellence Award in Variety Category	
12	Kim Jae-hwa, Henry	Top Excellence Award in Music/Talk Category	
13	Kim Gu-ra, Cha Tae-hyun	Top Excellence Award in Variety Category	
14	Cha In-pyo, Kim Yong-man	Program of the Year	
15	Jun Hyun-moo	Grand Prize (Daesang)	

== Special performances ==
Order	Artist	Song/Spectacle	Ref.
1	Park Na-rae	"Solo" (Original: Jennie)	
2	Under Nineteen	"We Are Young"	
3	Park Sung-kwang, Yang Se-hyung, Yoo Byung-jae	"Idol" (Original: BTS)	
4	Mamamoo	"Wind Flower" + "Starry Night" (별이 빛나는 밤)	
