= 2022 MBC Entertainment Awards =

22nd edition of award ceremony

- Official logo
- Awarded for: Excellence in variety entertainment
- Date: December 29, 2022
- Venue: MBC Public Hall, Sangam-dong, Mapo-gu, Seoul
- Country: South Korea
- Presented by: MBC
- Hosted by: Jun Hyun-moo; Lee Yi-kyung; Kang Min-kyung
- First award: 1990

Highlights
- Grand Prize: Jun Hyun-moo
- Program of the Year: I Live Alone
- Top Excellence Award Male: Boom
- Top Excellence Award Female: Ahn Young-mi
- Website: MBC Entertainment Awards

Television/radio coverage
- Network: MBC
- Viewership: Ratings: 5.1%; Viewers: 982,000

The 2022 MBC Entertainment Awards (Korean: 2022 MBC 방송연예대상) presented by Munhwa Broadcasting Corporation (MBC), took place on December 29, 2022, at MBC Public Hall in Sangam-dong, Mapo-gu, Seoul. It was hosted by Jun Hyun-moo, Lee Yi-kyung and Kang Min-kyung, and aired on December 29, 2022, at 20.45 (KST).

The Grand Prize was awarded to Jun Hyun-moo and I Live Alone became the Entertainment Program of the Year.

== Nominations and winners ==
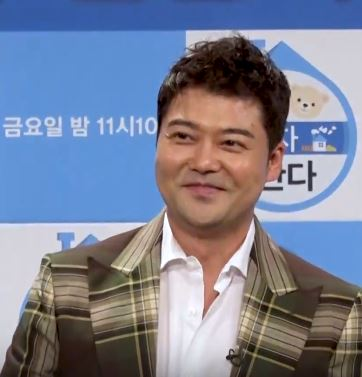
Jun Hyun-moo, winner of Grand Prize (Daesang)

- (Winners denoted in **bold**)

| Grand Prize (Daesang) | Entertainer of the Year Award | Program of the Year |
|---|---|---|
| **Jun Hyun-moo**; Park Na-rae; Kim Sung-joo; Ahn Jung-hwan; Yoo Jae-suk; Lee Young-ja; Kim Gu-ra | **Park Na-rae**; **Kim Sung-joo**; **Ahn Jung-hwan**; **Yoo Jae-suk**; **Lee Young-ja**; **Jun Hyun-moo**; **Kim Gu-ra** | **I Live Alone** |
Top Excellence Award
| Variety Category | | Radio Category |
| Male | Female | Radio Category |
| **Boom – It's Good If We Don't Fight and Where is My Home** | **Ahn Young-mi** – Radio Star; Kim Sook – Where is My Home and Hangout with Yoo; Song Eun-i – Omniscient Interfering View and Hangout with Yoo; Shin Bong-sun – King of Mask Singer; Jang Yoon-jeong – Fathers Who Crossed Things; Hong Hyun-hee – Omniscient Interfering View | **Jeong Ji-young** – This morning is Jeong Ji-young |
Excellence Award
| Variety Category | | Radio Category |
| Male | Female | Radio Category |
| **Key** – I Live Alone | **Lee Guk-joo** – Omniscient Interfering View | **Kim Eana** – Kim Eana's Starry Night; **Yoon Do-hyun** – 4 O'Clock Yoon Do-hyun |
| Music/Talk Category | | **Kim Eana** – Kim Eana's Starry Night; **Yoon Do-hyun** – 4 O'Clock Yoon Do-hyun |
| **Yang Se-chan**– Where is My Home; **Lee Mi-joo** – Hangout with Yoo | | **Kim Eana** – Kim Eana's Starry Night; **Yoon Do-hyun** – 4 O'Clock Yoon Do-hyun |
Rookie Award
| Variety Category | | Radio Category |
| Male | Female | Radio Category |
| **Code Kunst** – I Live Alone; Kwon Yul – Omniscient Interfering View; Kim Ho-young – Omniscient Interfering View and Radio Star; Lee Yi-kyung – Hangout with Yoo; Lee Joo-seung – I Live Alone; Cho Jun-ho & Cho Jun-hyun – Family Register Mate | **Park Jin-joo** – Hangout with Yoo; Uhm Hyun-kyung – Omniscient Interfering View; Lee Ye-rim – Family Register Mate; Patricia – Where is My Home, Omniscient Interfering View and Radio Star | **Choi Young-jae** – GOT7 Youngjae's Best Friend; **Park Young-jin** – Park Youngjin's Two O'Clock Live; **Lee Seok-hoon** – Lee Seokhoon's Brunch Cafe |
| Achievement Award | Popularity Award | Best Teamwork Award |
| **Lee Kyung-kyu** | **Lee Jang-woo** – I Live Alone; **Lee Yi-kyung** – Hangout with Yoo | **It's Good If We Don't Fight** – (Hur Jae, Kim Byung-hyun, Moon Kyung-eun, Woo Ji-won, Hong Sung-heon, and Lee Dae-hyung) |
| K-Content Award | Best Entertainer Award | Multiplayer Award |
| **King of Mask Singer** | **Kwon Yul** – Omniscient Interfering View | **Hong Hyun-hee** – Omniscient Interfering View; **kian84** – I Live Alone |
Best Couple Award
**Jun Hyun-moo, Park Na-rae & Lee Jang-woo – I Live Alone**; Lee Yi-kyung & Lee Mi-joo – Hangout with Yoo; Kim Gu-ra & Ahn Young-mi – Radio Star; Jonathan & Patricia – Where is My Home, Omniscient Interfering View; Cho Jun-ho & Cho Jun-hyun – Family Register Mate; Ahn Jung-hwan & Kim Seong-ju – Buddies in the Wild, Ahn Jung-hwan's Hidden Qatar; Jun Hyun-moo & Lee Young-ja – Omniscient Interfering View
Writer of the Year
| Variety | Radio | Current Events and Cultural Programs |
| **Kwon Jeong-hee – It's Good If We Don't Fight** | **Ryu Jeong-Eun – This is Jeong Ji-Young This Morning** | **Choi Mi-hye – I met you** |
Special Awards
| Variety Category | Current Events and Cultural Programs | Radio Category |
| **WSG Wannabe (Gaya-G Lee Bo-ram, Soyeon, Hynn and Jung Ji-so) – Hangout with Yoo** | **Lee Seo-young – Kissing Kiss**; **Park Ji-hoon – Real Story Exploration Team**; **Jeon Jong-hwan – Live Broadcast This Morning and PD Notebook** | **Kim Ga-Young – Good Morning FM, Jang Seong-gyu**; **Min Ja-Young – 57 Traffic Report** |
Radio Contribution Award
**As You**

== Performances ==
- Ive
- Lee Mi-joo and Lee Yi-kyung
- WSG Wannabe (Gaya G)

== Presenters ==
| SN | Presenter(s) | Award(s) | Ref. |
|---|---|---|---|
| 1 | Lee Mi-joo and Nam Yoon-su | Rookie of the Year award | |
| 2 | Hong Hyun-hee and Yang Jae-jin | Popularity Award | |
| 3 | Joo Woo-jae and Calm Man | Excellence Award | |
| 4 | Yoo Jae-seok and Choi Ji-woo | Grand Prize (Daesang) | |

== See also ==
- 2022 KBS Entertainment Awards
- 2022 SBS Entertainment Awards
