= Unexpected Q =

2018 South Korean television program

- Hangul: 뜻밖의 Q
- RR: Tteutbakkui Q
- MR: Ttŭtpakkŭi Q
- Genre: Variety; Talk Show
- Presented by: Lee Soo-geun; Jun Hyun-moo
- Starring: Eun Ji-won; Yoo Se-yoon; Seungkwan
- Country of origin: South Korea
- Original language: Korean
- No. of seasons: 1
- No. of episodes: 25

Production
- Producer: Choi Haeng-ho
- Production location: South Korea
- Running time: 90 minutes
- Production company: MBC

Original release
- Network: MBC
- Release: May 5 – October 27, 2018

Unexpected Q (Korean: 뜻밖의 Q) is a 2018 South Korean television entertainment program which aired on MBC every Saturday at 18:25 (KST). The show took over the time slot of long time variety show Infinite Challenge.

== Cast ==
=== Hosts ===
- Lee Soo-geun
- Jun Hyun-moo

=== Permanent Cast (starting from episode 3) ===
- Eun Ji-won (Sechs Kies)
- Yoo Se-yoon
- Seungkwan (Seventeen) (absent in episodes 20-23)

=== Question Panel ===
- The Koxx (Episodes 1-8; only Lee Hyun-song and Shaun appeared on episodes 1-2)
- Duetto (Episode 11)
- The East Light (Episodes 9-10, 12-16)

== Episodes ==
=== 2018 ===
Episode	Broadcast Date	Guest(s)	Remark(s)
1	May 5	Noh Sa-yeon, Seol Woon-do, Eun Ji-won (Sechs Kies), Kangta (H.O.T), Yoo Se-yoon, Sunny (Girls' Generation), Seo Eun-kwang (BtoB), Solar (Mamamoo), Song Min-ho (Winner), Sejeong (Gugudan), Dahyun (Twice); Answering guests: Kang Jae-hyung, Seo Joo-kyung	—N/a
2	May 12	Ji Sang-ryeol, Eun Ji-won (Sechs Kies), Ahn Young-mi, Hangzoo (Rhythm Power), Jung Joon-young, DinDin, Bomi (Apink), Seungkwan (Seventeen); Answering guest: Hyun Sook	1st change in format of the program Starting from this episode until episode 6, the show uses a team battle format, each team consisting of 2 persons
3	May 19	Hong Seok-cheon, Yook Joong-wan (Rose Motel), Ahn Young-mi, Kim Jae-hwan (Wanna One), JooE (Momoland); Answering guest: Wax	Eun Ji-won, Yoo Se-yoon and Seungkwan have become the permanent cast of the show starting from this episode
4	May 26	Jo Sung-mo, Ahn Young-mi, Hangzoo (Rhythm Power), Lee Seung-hoon (Winner), Mijoo (Lovelyz); Answering guest: Park Mi-kyung	—N/a
5	June 2	Defconn, K.Will, Shindong (Super Junior), DinDin, Kim Chung-ha; Answering guests: Kim Won-jun, Rooftop Moonlight	—N/a
6	June 9	Ji Sang-ryeol, Defconn, Leeteuk (Super Junior), Lee Seok-hoon (SG Wannabe), JR (NU'EST); Answering guests: Lovelyz	—N/a
Episode	Broadcast Date	Teams (Note: Names in Italic font are of the hosts and the permanent cast of the show)	Remark(s)
7	June 16	Team Soogeun: Eun Ji-won, Kim Young-chul, Shin Bo-ra, Minho (Shinee); Team Hyunmoo: Yoo Se-yoon, Seungkwan, Kim Chang-yeol (DJ Doc), Yerin (GFriend)	2nd change in the format of the program The permanent cast and guests will be divided into Team Soogeun and Team Hyunmoo
8	June 23	Team Soogeun: Seungkwan, Park Sung-kwang, Solbi, Mingyu (Seventeen); Team Hyunmoo: Eun Ji-won, Yoo Se-yoon, Jang Su-won (Sechs Kies), Muzie	Close Friends Special
9	June 30	Team Soogeun: Yoo Se-yoon, Jang Do-yeon, Seolhyun (AOA); Team Hyunmoo: Eun Ji-won, Seungkwan, Jimin (AOA)	For only this episode, the permanent cast and guests will decide their teams based on songs that selected by team's leaders
10	July 7	Team Jiwon: Jun Hyun-moo, Seungkwan, JooE (Momoland); Team Seyoon: Lee Soo-geun, Koyote (Kim Jong-min, Shin Ji)	For only this episode, Eun Ji-won and Yoo Se-yoon become the leaders of their teams
11	July 14	Team Soogeun: Yoo Se-yoon, Heo Kyung-hwan, Jisoo (Blackpink); Team Hyunmoo: Eun Ji-won, Seungkwan, Don Spike	Starting from this episode, the two team leaders decide their teams based on songs that selected by casts and guests
12	July 21	Team Soogeun: Eun Ji-won, Lee Guk-joo, Hoshi (Seventeen); Team Hyunmoo: Yoo Se-yoon, Seungkwan, Gyeongree (Nine Muses)	—N/a
13	July 28	Team Soogeun: Yoo Se-yoon, Sandeul (B1A4), Kei (Lovelyz); Team Hyunmoo: Eun Ji-won, Seungkwan, Lee Seok-hoon (SG Wannabe)	—N/a
14	August 4	Team Soogeun: Eun Ji-won, Yuju (GFriend), Ju-ne (iKON); Team Hyunmoo: Yoo Se-yoon, Seungkwan, Bomi (Apink)	—N/a
15	August 11	Team Soogeun: Eun Ji-won, Hwang Chi-yeul, Seo Eun-kwang (BtoB); Team Hyunmoo: Yoo Se-yoon, Seungkwan, Sejeong (Gugudan)	—N/a
16	August 18	Team Soogeun: Eun Ji-won, Yoo Se-yoon, Seungkwan; Team Hyunmoo: Han Dong-geun, Seunghee (Oh My Girl), JooE (Momoland)	—N/a
Episode	Broadcast Date	Guest(s)	Remark(s)
17	August 25	Sayuri Fujita (Japan), Abigail Alderete (Paraguay), Greg Priester (United States), Petri Kalliola (Finland), Oumaima Fatih (Morocco); Sunny Kim (MIPFormats Korea branch CEO), staff of the MBC Overseas Sales Business department (Cho Yeon-hyung, Lee Eun-sung)	From this episode to episode 21, the format of the program is Project Rescue Unexpected Q 1st part of the program: PD Choi Haeng-ho's discussion with the program cast 2nd part of the program: Global Special Emoticon Quiz, using a team battle format, each team consisting of 2 persons, plus discussion segment between the cast and the sales professionals
-	No broadcast on September 1 due to 2018 Asian Games Live telecast of Japan vs South Korea Finals soccer match.		
18	September 8	Andreas Varsakopoulos; Team Hyunmoo: Park Sung-kwang, Hangzoo (Rhythm Power), JooE (Momoland); Team Jiwon: Jang Su-won (Sechs Kies), Lee Guk-joo, Sandeul (B1A4); Team Seyoon: Don Spike, Park Hwi-soon, Kei (Lovelyz); Team Seungkwan: Ji Sang-ryeol, Lee Seok-hoon (SG Wannabe), Solbi	1st part of the program: Selection of the Global Ambassador; 2nd part of the program: Emoticon Quiz Championship
19	September 15	Team Seyoon-Hyunmoo: Don Spike, Park Hwi-soon, Lee Guk-joo, Kei (Lovelyz); Team Seungkwan-Jiwon: Ji Sang-ryeol, Park Sung-kwang, Lee Seok-hoon (SG Wannabe), Solbi	1st part of the program: Emoticon Quiz Championship finals 2nd part of the program: Lee Soo-geun's preparation and attendance for BCWW 2018
20	September 22	Im Ho, Park Hwi-soon, Park Sung-kwang, Lee Yong-jin, Lee Jin-ho	Welcoming Chuseok Fun Special: Unexpected Q in Joseon; Seungkwan is absent due to overseas concerts schedules
21	September 29	Managers of the cast: Kim Hee-sung (Lee Soo-geun's manager), Han Jae-sang (Jun Hyun-moo's manager), Kim Do-hyun (Eun Ji-won's manager), Park Chan-ho (Yoo Se-yoon's manager)	Seungkwan is absent due to overseas concerts schedules
Episode	Broadcast Date	Teams	Remark(s)
22	October 6	Team Soogeun: Eun Ji-won, Yoo Min-sang, P.O (Block B); Team Hyunmoo: Yoo Se-yoon, Sleepy, Lee Yong-jin	Format of the program returns to the one used in episodes 7-16; Seungkwan is absent due to overseas concerts schedules
23	October 13	Team Soogeun: Yoo Se-yoon, Lee Seok-hoon (SG Wannabe), P.O (Block B); Team Hyunmoo: Eun Ji-won, Defconn, Seunghee (Oh My Girl)	Seungkwan is absent due to overseas concerts schedules
24	October 20	Team Soogeun: Eun Ji-won, Seungkwan, DinDin; Team Hyunmoo: Yoo Se-yoon, Park Sung-kwang, Solbin (Laboum)	
25	October 27	No guests	Final Episode

== Ratings ==
In the ratings below, N/R means no record or not reported, the highest rating for the show will be in red and the lowest rating for the show will be in blue.

=== 2018 ===
Ep.	Broadcast Date	TNmS Ratings		AGB Ratings	
Ep.	Broadcast Date	Part 1	Part 2	Part 1	Part 2
1	May 5	3.2%	4.2%	3.4%	4.2%
2	May 12	3.7%	4.4%	3.6%	4.3%
3	May 19	3.0%	3.1%	2.9%	3.0%
4	May 26	2.6%	3.5%	3.1%	3.3%
5	June 2	3.1%	3.3%	2.9%	3.1%
6	June 9	2.6%	3.2%	2.4%	3.1%
7	June 16	3.5%	3.8%	3.3%	3.6%
8	June 23	2.2%	3.7%	2.0%	3.5%
9	June 30	3.1%	3.4%	2.9%	3.2%
10	July 7	3.1%	3.6%	2.9%	3.4%
11	July 14	2.7%	3.2%	2.6%	3.0%
12	July 21	2.7%	2.9%	2.6%	2.1%
13	July 28	3.0%	3.1%	2.7%	2.8%
14	August 4	2.4%	3.2%	2.3%	3.0%
15	August 11	2.4%	2.9%	2.3%	2.8%
16	August 18	2.3%	3.6%	2.2%	3.3%
17	August 25	2.5%	3.3%	2.4%	3.0%
18	September 8	NR		2.7%	2.9%
19	September 15	NR		1.8%	2.1%
20	September 22	NR		1.9%	2.7%
21	September 29	NR		2.8%	3.0%
22	October 6	NR		2.1%	3.4%
23	October 13	NR		NR	3.1%
24	October 20	NR		3.0%	3.9%
25	October 27	NR		NR	3.3%

== Awards and nominations ==
Year	Award	Category	Recipient	Result	Ref.
2018	18th MBC Entertainment Awards	Grand Prize (Daesang)	Jun Hyun-moo	Nominated	
2018	18th MBC Entertainment Awards	Top Male Excellence Award, Music/Talk Show	Lee Soo-geun	Nominated	
2018	18th MBC Entertainment Awards	Top Male Excellence Award, Music/Talk Show	Eun Ji-won	Nominated	
2018	18th MBC Entertainment Awards	Entertainer of the Year Award	Jun Hyun-moo	Won	
2018	18th MBC Entertainment Awards	Best Male Award, Music/Talk Show	Yoo Se-yoon	Nominated	
2018	18th MBC Entertainment Awards	Best Male Rookie Award, Music/Talk Show	Seungkwan	Won	
2019	23rd Asian Television Awards	Best Game Or Quiz Programme	Unexpected Q	Nominated	
