= 2024 MBC Entertainment Awards =

24th edition of award ceremony

- Official poster
- Awarded for: Excellence in variety entertainment
- Date: January 28, 2025
- Venue: MBC Public Hall, Sangam-dong, Mapo-gu, Seoul
- Country: South Korea
- Presented by: MBC
- Hosted by: Jun Hyun-moo; Yoon Eun-hye; Lee Jang-woo
- First award: 1990

Highlights
- Grand Prize: Jun Hyun-moo
- Program of the Year: I Live Alone
- Website: 2024 MBC Entertainment Awards

Television/radio coverage
- Network: MBC TV
- Viewership: Ratings: 4.7%; Viewers: 955,000

The 2024 MBC Entertainment Awards presented by Munhwa Broadcasting Corporation (MBC), took place on January 28, 2025, at MBC Public Hall in Sangam-dong, Mapo-gu, Seoul. The 30th anniversary award ceremony was hosted by Jun Hyun-moo, Yoon Eun-hye, and Lee Jang-woo.

Originally, the ceremony was scheduled to take place on December 29, 2024, however the event was postponed due to the Jeju Air Flight 2216 accident, with news coverage of the latter taking place instead. On January 17, 2025, MBC announced the new ceremony-date to be during the Lunar New Year holiday on January 28 at 20:20 (KST).

On January 20, 2025 it was announced that Yoon Eun-hye will replace Lee Hye-ri as host for the re-scheduled ceremony.

In the ceremony broadcast-live, Kim Dae-ho, Im Woo-il, Park Ji-hyun, Jinusean, Shin Gi-ru, Lee Guk-joo, Han Hyun-jae, and Park Jung-hyun had a congratulatory performance. Jun Hyun-moo won the Grand Prize and Entertainer of the Year awards, while I Live Alone was the recipient of Program of the Year award.

== Nominations and winners ==
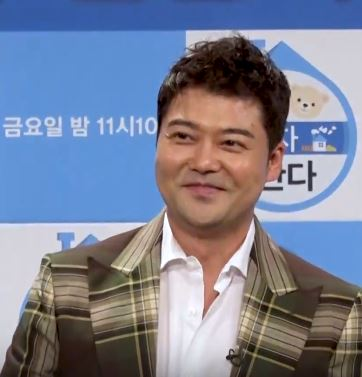
Jun Hyun-moo, winner of Grand Prize (Daesang)

- (Winners denoted in **bold**)

Grand Prize (Daesang)	Entertainer of the Year Award	Program of the Year
**Jun Hyun-moo**	**Kim Dae-ho**; **Kian84**; **Yoo Jae-suk**; **Jun Hyun-moo**	**I Live Alone**
Top Excellence Award
Variety Category		Radio Category
Male	Female	Radio Category
**Kim Dae-ho – Save Me! Holmes**	**Jang Do-yeon – Radio Star, I'm Born to Play Music, Stingy Man**	**Kim Eana – Kim Eana's Starry Night**
Reality Category
Male		Female
**Kian84 – I Live Alone, Music While I'm At It**		**Park Na-rae – I Live Alone, Music While I'm At It**
Excellence Award
Variety Category		Radio Category
Male	Female	Radio Category
**Lee Yi-kyung – What Do You Do When You Play?**	**Hong Hyun Hee – Omniscient Interfering View**	**Park Young-jin – Park Joon-hyung, Park Young-jin's Two O'Clock Rewind**; **The Boyz's Sunwoo – Idol Radio Season 4**
Rookie Award
Variety Category		Radio Category
Male	Female	Radio Category
**Koo Seong-hwan – I Live Alone**	**Choi Kang-hee – Omniscient Interfering View**	**Yoon Tae-jin – Yoon Tae-jin's FM Date**; **Son Tae-jin – Son Tae-jin's Trot Radio**
Achievement Award		Best Teamwork Award
**Bae Cheol-soo**		**It's Fortunately If You Get a Good Rest**
Popularity Award
Reality		Show/Variety
**Teo Yoo – I'm Born to Play Music**		**Lim Woo-il – Radio Star, Stingy Man**
Best Couple Award
**Yoo Jae-suk & Haha – Hangout with Yoo**; Yang Se-hyung, Park Na-rae – Save Me! Holmes; Kian84, Kim Dae-ho & Lee Jang-woo – I Live Alone; Song Ji-eun & Park Wi – Omniscient Interfering View; Shin Gi-ru, Lee Guk-joo, Poongja – Omniscient Interfering View; Kian84, Pani Bottle, Teo Yoo – I'm Born to Play Music
Writer of the Year
Variety	Radio	Current Events and Cultural Programs
**Lee Kyung-ha – I Live Alone**	**Kim Eun-sun – Good Morning FM, This is Tay**	**Nam Soo-hee – Midnight Ghost Stories, Architecture with a Reason**
Special Awards
Best Partner Award	Current Events and Cultural Programs	Radio Category
**Adapt**	**Kim Eung-soo – Oh Eun-young Report: Marriage Hell**; **Park Ji-min – Today N, Oh Eun-young Report: Marriage Hell**; **Lim Hyun-joo – Live This Morning**	**Noh Joong-hoon – Noh Joong-hoon's Taste of Travel**; **Ryu Soo-min – Morning & News, This is Ryu Soo-min**
Digital Content Award	Best Entertainer Award	Multiplayer Award
**Cleaning Maniac Brian**	**(Reality): Choi Daniel – Omniscient Interfering View**; **(Show/Variety): Joo Woo-jae – What Do You Do When You Play?, Save Me! Holmes**	**Lee Jang-woo – I Live Alone, The Captain's Side Dishes, Country Village Lee Jang-woo**
MC Award
Current Affairs/Educational		Producer
**Oh Seung-hoon – PD Note**		**Yoo Se-yoon – Radio Star**
Best Partner Award		Special Producer Award
**Kim Gu-ra & Kim Sung-joo – King of Mask Singer**		**Boom – It's Fortunately If You Get a Good Rest**; **Key – I Live Alone**
Radio Contribution Award
**Emotion Studio**
Hot Issue Award
**Kim Seok-hoon – What Do You Do When You Play?**

== See also ==
- 2024 KBS Entertainment Awards
- 2024 SBS Entertainment Awards
