= Real Man 300 =

2018 South Korean television series

- Promotional poster
- Genre: Reality
- Directed by: Choi Min-geun; Jang Seung-min
- Starring: Various artists
- Narrated by: Lee Si-young
- Country of origin: South Korea
- Original language: Korean
- No. of episodes: 18

Production
- Executive producer: Kwon Seok
- Production location: South Korea
- Running time: 80 minutes
- Production company: Munhwa Broadcasting Corporation

Original release
- Network: MBC
- Release: September 21, 2018 – January 25, 2019

Related
- Real Man

Real Man 300 (Korean: 진짜사나이 300; RR: Jinjjasanai 300) is a South Korean reality program featuring male and female celebrities as they experience life in the military. It is a spin-off of reality program Real Man which had ended in 2016. It aired on MBC every Friday at 21:50 (KST) from September 21, 2018 to January 25, 2019.

== List of editions and cast members ==
=== Korea Army Academy ===
Member	Broadcast period	
Member	Debut date	End date
Kim Ho-young	September 21, 2018	September 28, 2018
Matthew Douma	September 21, 2018	November 2, 2018
Kang Ji-hwan	September 21, 2018	November 2, 2018
Viktor An	September 21, 2018	November 2, 2018
Hongseok (Pentagon)	September 21, 2018	November 2, 2018
Kim Jae-hwa	September 21, 2018	November 2, 2018
Oh Yoon-ah	September 21, 2018	November 2, 2018
Shin Ji	September 21, 2018	November 2, 2018
Lee Yu-bi	September 21, 2018	November 2, 2018
Lisa	September 21, 2018	November 2, 2018

=== Special Warfare School ===
Member	Broadcast period	
Member	Debut date	End date
Oh Ji-ho	November 9, 2018	January 25, 2019
Sandara Park	November 9, 2018	January 25, 2019
Lee Jeong-hyun	November 9, 2018	January 25, 2019
Gamst	November 9, 2018	January 25, 2019
JooE	November 9, 2018	January 25, 2019
Matthew Douma	November 9, 2018	January 25, 2019
Viktor An	November 9, 2018	January 25, 2019
Hongseok (Pentagon)	November 9, 2018	January 25, 2019
Kim Jae-hwa	November 9, 2018	January 25, 2019
Oh Yoon-ah	November 9, 2018	January 25, 2019

=== "White Skull" Unit ===
Member	Broadcast period	
Member	Debut date	End date
Narsha	November 23, 2018	January 11, 2019
Kim Hee-jung	November 23, 2018	January 11, 2019
Johyun	November 23, 2018	January 11, 2019
Lucas	November 23, 2018	January 11, 2019
Kim Jae-woo	November 23, 2018	January 18, 2019
Choi Yoon-young	November 23, 2018	January 18, 2019
Shownu	November 23, 2018	January 18, 2019
Ravi	November 23, 2018	January 18, 2019
Eunseo	November 23, 2018	January 18, 2019
Park Jae-min	November 23, 2018	January 25, 2019

== Ratings ==
In the table below, the blue numbers represent the lowest ratings and the red numbers represent the highest ratings.

=== 2018 ===
List of ratings in 2018 (Episodes 1–14)

Ep. #	Original airdate	TNmS (Nationwide)	AGB Nielsen (Nationwide)
1	September 21, 2018	7.6%	7.7%
2	September 28, 2018	6.8%	7.0%
3	October 5, 2018	—	7.3%
4	October 12, 2018	—	7.4%
5	October 26, 2018	6.3%	6.0%
6	November 2, 2018	5.1%	5.4%
7	November 9, 2018	—	6.7%
8	November 16, 2018	6.1%	5.9%
9	November 23, 2018	6.3%	6.9%
10	November 30, 2018	5.5%	5.8%
11	December 7, 2018	—	5.4%
12	December 14, 2018	—	5.3%
13	December 21, 2018	—	4.3%
14	December 28, 2018	—	4.9%

=== 2019 ===
List of ratings in 2019 (Episodes 15–18)

Ep. #	Original airdate	TNmS (Nationwide)	AGB Nielsen (Nationwide)
15	January 4, 2019	—	5.1%
16	January 11, 2019	—	4.4%
17	January 18, 2019	—	5.0%
18	January 25, 2019	—	%

== Awards and nominations ==
Year	Award	Category	Recipients	Result	Ref.
2018	18th MBC Entertainment Awards	Excellence Award in Variety Category	Kim Jae-hwa	Won	
2018	18th MBC Entertainment Awards	Excellence Award in Variety Category	Oh Yoon-ah	Nominated	
2018	18th MBC Entertainment Awards	Rookie Award in Variety Category	Gamst	Won	
2018	18th MBC Entertainment Awards	Rookie Award in Variety Category	JooE	Nominated	
2018	18th MBC Entertainment Awards	Rookie Award in Variety Category	Lee Yu-bi	Nominated	
2018	18th MBC Entertainment Awards	Rookie Award in Variety Category	Matthew Douma	Nominated	
2018	18th MBC Entertainment Awards	Rookie Award in Music/Talk Category	Kim Ho-young	Nominated	
2018	18th MBC Entertainment Awards	PD's Award	Real Man 300 team	Won	
