= Lilka =

South Korean female YouTuber (born 1990)

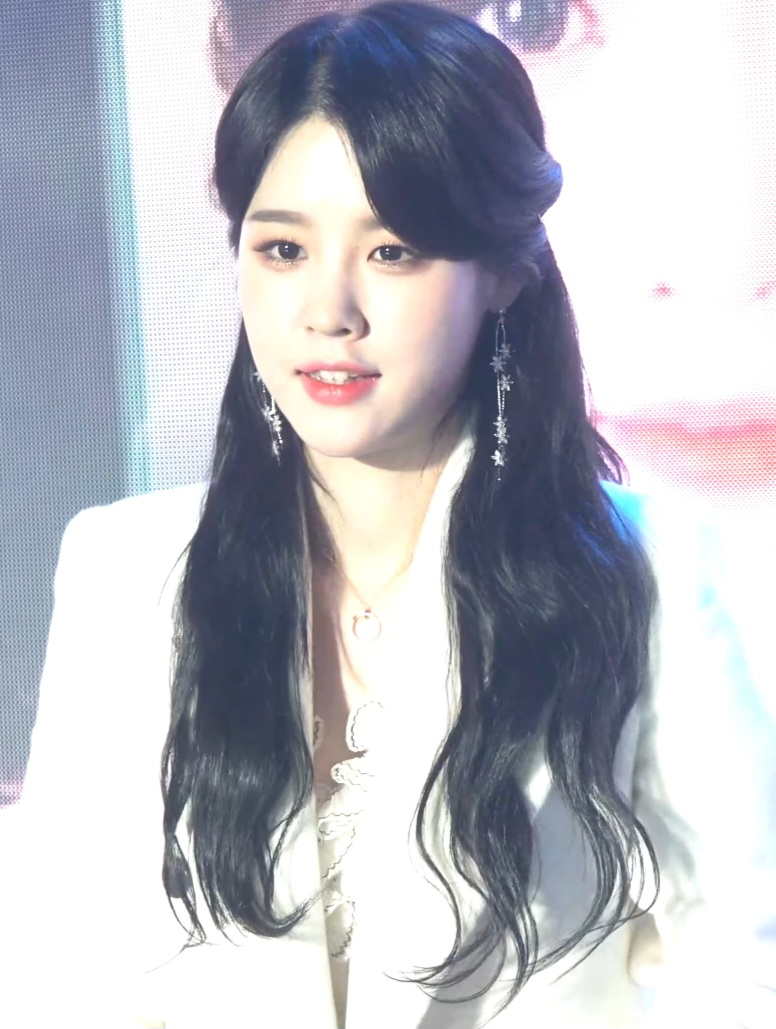
- Born: October 21, 1990 (age 35); Poitiers, France
- Occupations: YouTuber; streamer

YouTube information
- Channel: 릴카
- Years active: 2017–active (streamer)
- Subscribers: 1.08 million
- Last updated: June 2022

Lilka (Korean: 릴카) is a South Korean YouTuber and live streamer.

== Life ==
Lilka was born on October 21, 1990 in Poitiers, France, from Korean parents who studied arts. Lilka graduated from Ewha Womans University and majored in French Language & Literature. During college, she went to Lille Catholic University as an exchange student and stayed for a year. After graduation, she worked at Air France as a flight attendant for language interpretation.

Lilka was a Twitch streamer until Twitch suspended her accounts without warning in January 2018, claiming that she was using viewbot software. Then, Lilka moved to AfreecaTV and YouTube. In 2019, she became a K-league ambassador. In February 2019, she became a cover model of Maxim Korea. She visited Suwon World Cup Stadium and made special event with Gamst and Suwon Samsung Bluewings at May 4, 2019.

She is a fan of Cesinha who plays for Daegu FC. She visited DGB Daegu Bank Park and made special event with Daegu FC on August 17, 2019. She has also done online game broadcasting, such as Black Desert Online. In 2021, she appeared in The Super Junior Future Revolutionary Group which is a web entertainment about mobile game Marvel Future Revolution.
