= JooE =

South Korean singer and rapper (born 1999)

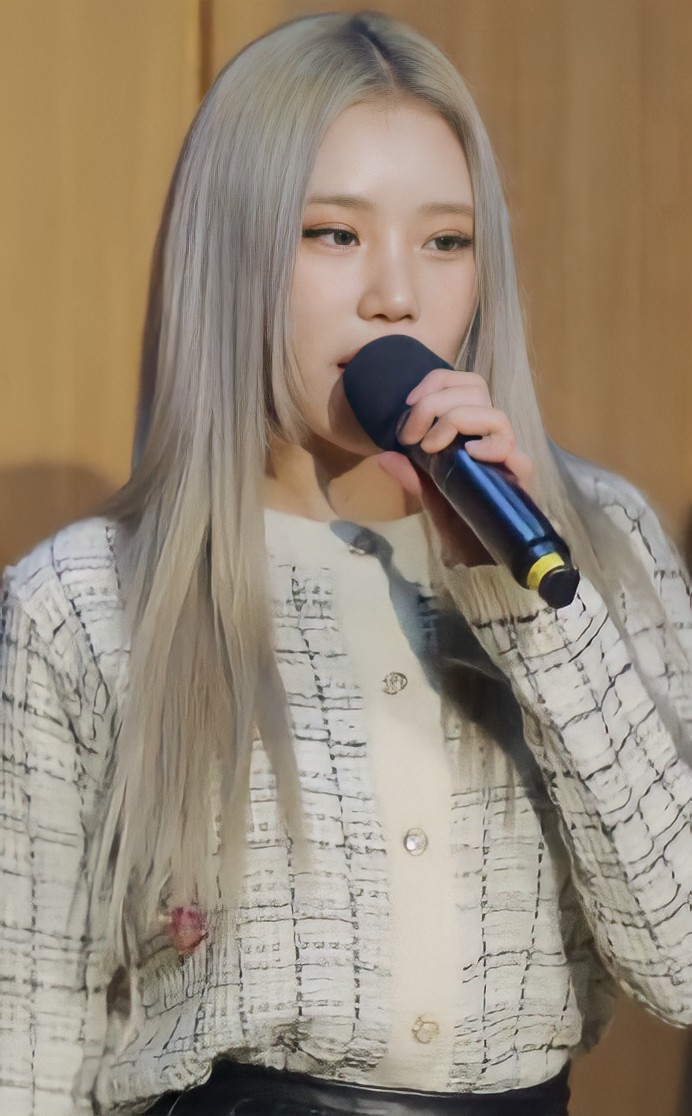
- JooE in January 2022
- Born: Lee Joo-Won; August 18, 1999 (age 27); Seoul, South Korea
- Education: Hanlim Multi Art School
- Occupations: Singer, rapper
- Musical career
- Genre: K-pop
- Instrument: Vocals
- Years active: 2016–present
- Labels: MLD; Inyeon
- Member of: Momoland

Korean name
- Hangul: 이주원
- RR: I Juwon
- MR: I Chuwŏn

Stage name
- Hangul: 주이
- RR: Jui
- MR: Chui

Lee Joo-won (Korean: 이주원; born August 18, 1999) better known by her stage name JooE (주이), is a South Korean singer and rapper. She is a member of the girl group Momoland under former MLD Entertainment and current Inyeon Entertainment.

== Personal life ==
JooE was born in Seoul, South Korea, She has an older brother named Lee Min Jae. On an episode of Radio Star, JooE revealed that she had undergone rhinoplasty in prior to joining MLD Entertainment. JooE cited singer IU as her role model, saying "IU sunbaenim. Of course she's gorgeous and an amazing singer, but I also find it respectful that she has a very pronounced perspective, and you can feel that in her music."

=== Education ===
JooE studied and graduated from Damoon Elementary School and Yongmun Middle School, she also graduated from Hanlim Multi Art School on February 9, 2018.

== Career ==
=== 2016–2022: Career with Momoland ===
In 2016, JooE became a contestant in Finding Momoland, a show dedicated to select the members of the new girl group Momoland under MLD Entertainment. JooE joined MLD a month before Finding Momoland began. In June 2016, members JooE, alongside Nancy, Ahin, Hyebin, Yeonwoo, Jane and Nayun were selected as the seven finalists of Finding Momoland. After the members were selected, the group was formed and made their official debut with the mini album Welcome to Momoland, released on November 10, 2016.

In 2018, JooE appeared in King of Mask Singer as Helicopter. In 2022, JooE became a contestant on JTBC's singing survival show The Second World, where she obtained fourth place.

=== 2023–present: Group disbandment and Queendom Puzzle ===
On January 27, 2023, it was announced that JooE, along with the Momoland members, departed from MLD Entertainment following expiration of the contracts. Momoland officially announced their disbandment on February 14. In June 2023, JooE participated as a contestant on Mnet's Queendom Puzzle, becoming the only contestant not represented by any entertainment company. She was eventually eliminated in the first elimination rounds.

== Other ventures ==
=== Endorsements ===
JooE became an ambassador of the makeup brand Baker 7 in 2018. She has also filmed an advertisement for Tropicana's sparkling soda and for GS25, both in 2017. She has also advertised for Guronsan Barmond in 2018 and for Mom's Touch in 2019 alongside YouTuber Yunjuku.

== Filmography ==
=== Television series ===
Year	Title	Role	Notes	Ref.
2018	Dae Jang Geum Is Watching	As an idol trainees (with fellow-members Nancy, Hyebin, and Daisy)	Guest appearance	

=== Television shows ===
Year	Title	Role	Notes	Ref.
2016	Finding Momoland	Contestant		
2017	The Show	Host	October 17, 2017 – May 8, 2018	
2018	Studio Vibes	Host		
2018	Battle Trip	Special host		
2018	School Attack	Host		
2018	King of Mask Singer	Contestant	as "Helicopter"	
2018	Get It Beauty	Host		
2018	Real Man 300	Cast member		
2019	Law of the Jungle	Cast member	Episode 388–392	
2020	I-Land	Host	Special Episode	
2021	The Village Lover	Cast member		
2022	The Second World	Contestant		
2023	Queendom Puzzle	Contestant		
