= Lee Yu-bi =

South Korean actress (born 1990)

- 이소율
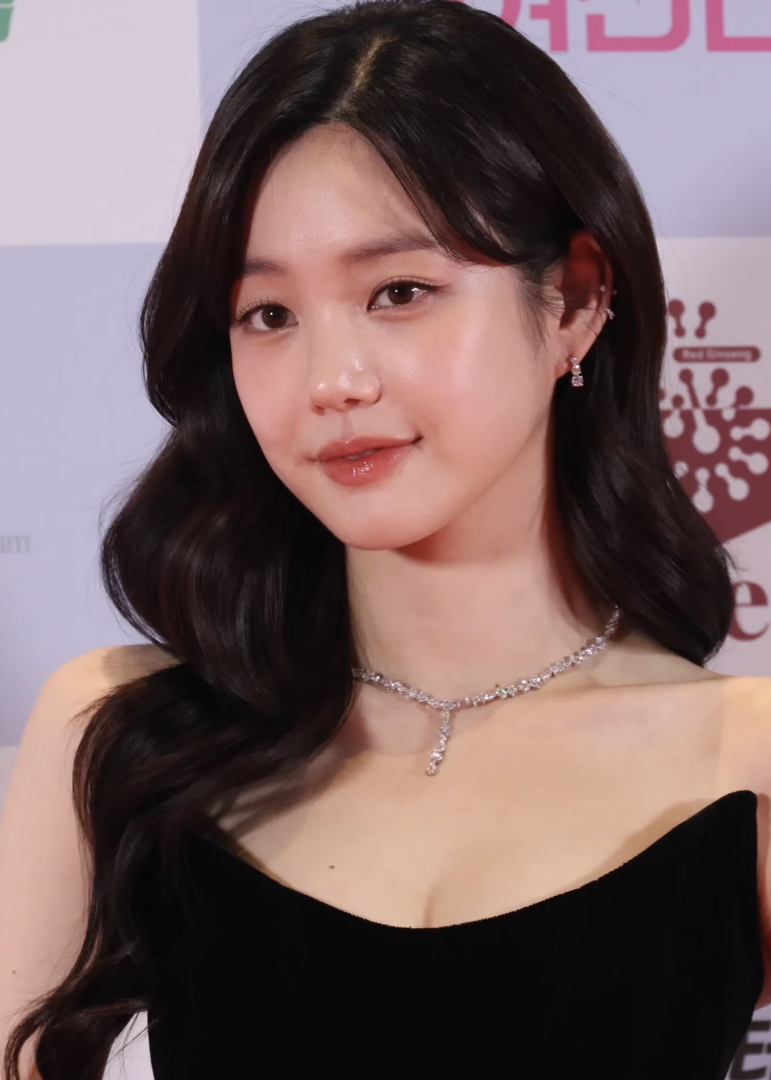
- Lee in December 2025
- Born: Im Yu-jin; November 22, 1990 (age 35); Seoul, South Korea
- Education: Ewha Womans University (Voice)
- Occupation: Actress
- Years active: 2011–present
- Agent: Ghost Studio
- Mother: Kyeon Mi-ri
- Family: Lee Da-in (sister); Lee Seung-gi (brother-in-law)

Korean name
- Hangul: 이소율
- RR: I Soyul
- MR: I Soyul

Stage name
- Hangul: 이유비
- Hanja: 李侑菲
- RR: I Yubi
- MR: I Yubi

Former name
- Hangul: 임유진
- Hanja: 任侑珍
- RR: Im Yujin
- MR: Im Yujin

Lee So-yul (Korean: 이소율; born Im Yu-jin, November 22, 1990), better known by the stage name Lee Yu-bi (이유비) is a South Korean actress.

== Early life ==
Lee and her younger sister Lee Da-in are the daughters of the actors Kyeon Mi-ri and Im Young-gyu, who divorced in 1993. When Kyeon remarried in 1998 to Lee Hong-heon, he legally adopted his stepdaughters and gave them his surname. Yu-bi changed her real name, Lee Yu-jin, to Lee So-yul, but she did not change her stage name.

== Career ==
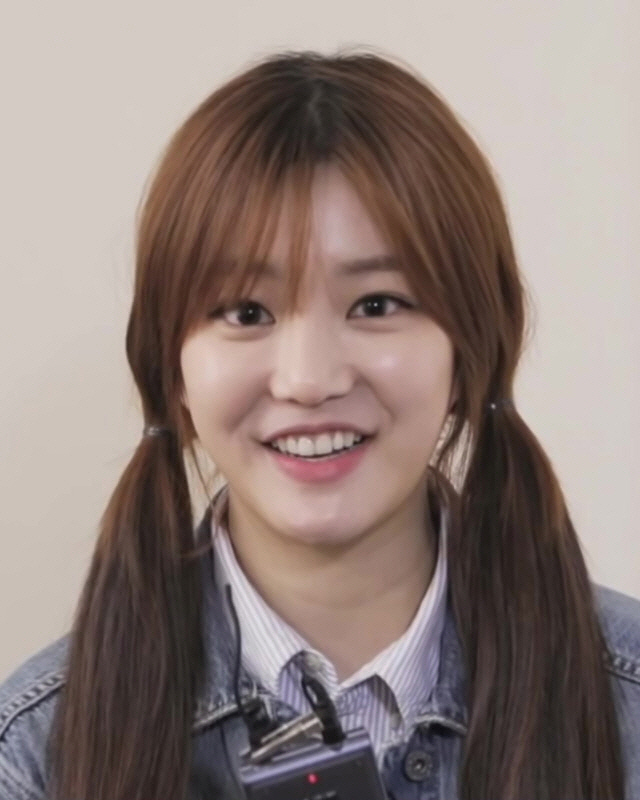
Lee during Twenty promotions in 2015

She began her career in the 2011 sitcom Vampire Idol, then played supporting roles in television dramas The Innocent Man (2012), Gu Family Book (2013), and Pinocchio (2014), as well as the films The Royal Tailor (2014) and Twenty (2015). Lee plays her first leading role in Scholar Who Walks the Night, adapted from the webtoon about a Joseon vampire scholar and a cross-dressing bookseller.

In 2017, Lee starred alongside Choi Min-ho in the JTBC web drama Somehow 18. In October 2017, Lee signed with new management agency 935 Entertainment.

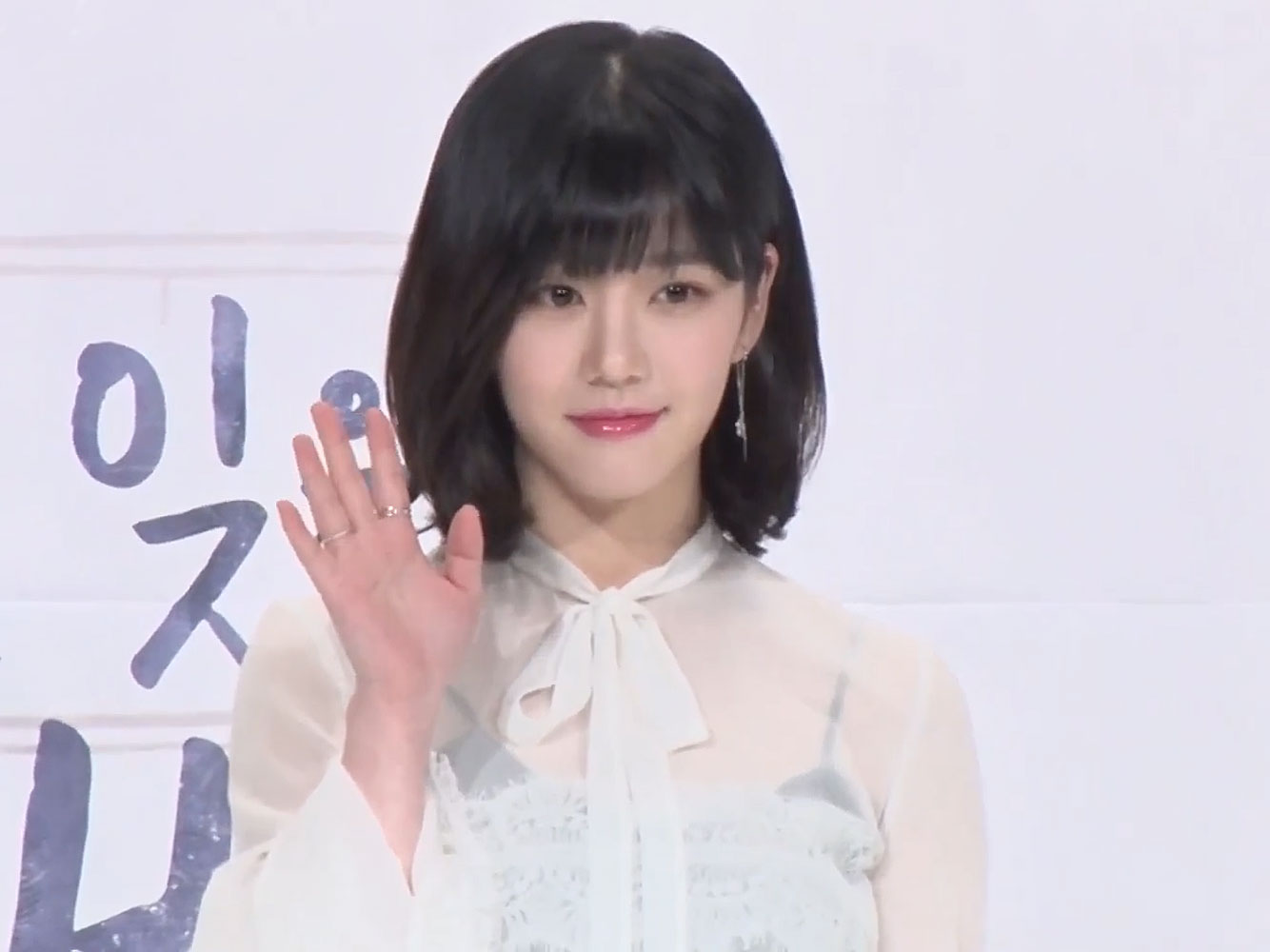
Lee in 2018

In 2018, Lee starred in the medical slice-of-life drama, A Poem a Day.

In July 2023, Lee left 935 Entertainment and signed with new agency Ghost Studio.

== Filmography ==
=== Film ===
Year	Title	Role	Ref.
2014	The Royal Tailor	Royal concubine Soui	
2015	Twenty	So-he	
2020	Best Friend	Lee Eun-jin	
TBA	Love Affair	Song Yu-hwa	

=== Television series ===
Year	Title	Role	Notes	Ref.
2011	Vampire Idol	Yu-bi		
2012	The Innocent Man	Kang Choco		
2013	Gu Family Book	Park Chung-jo		
2014	Pinocchio	Yoon Yoo-rae		
2015	The Scholar Who Walks the Night	Jo Yang-sun		
2016	Uncontrollably Fond	Lee Yu-bi	Cameo (Episode 4)	
2018	A Poem a Day	Woo Bo-young		
2020	Backstreet Rookie	Customer with dog	Cameo (Episode 2)	
2021	Joseon Exorcist	Eo-ri	Episode 1–2 (Note: Cancels complete broadcast of show due to history distortion and Chinese style props. The show faced a massive amount of criticism leading to sponsorships and advertisements pulling out.)	
2021	The Penthouse: War in Life	Il-jin	Season 3; Cameo (Episode 7)	
2021–present	Yumi's Cells	Ruby	Season 1–3	
2023–2024	The Escape of the Seven	Han Mo-ne	Season 1–2	

=== Web series ===
Year	Title	Role	Ref.
2017	Somehow 18	Han Na-bi	

=== Television shows ===
Year	Title	Role	Ref.
2014	Inkigayo	MC	
2018	Real Man 300	Cast member	
2018	Law of the Jungle in Last Indian Ocean	Cast member	
2019–2020	Dogs Are Incredible	Host	
2022	Your Punch Line	Cast member	
2025	2025 Seoul International Film Awards	MC	

=== Music video appearances ===
Year	Title	Artist	Ref.
2013	"Reminisce"	Huh Gak	
2014	"No More"	Highlight	
2019	"Bad Habits"	Shaun	

== Awards and nominations ==
Name of the award ceremony, year presented, category, nominee of the award, and the result of the nomination
Award ceremony	Year	Category	Nominee / Work	Result	Ref.
APAN Star Awards	2013	Best New Actress	Gu Family Book	Won	
Asia Model Awards	2021	Popular Star Award	Yumi's Cells	Won	
Asia Rainbow TV Awards	2014	Best Supporting Actress	Gu Family Book	Nominated	
Baeksang Arts Awards	2013	Best New Actress – Television	The Innocent Man	Nominated	
Blue Dragon Film Awards	2015	Best New Actress	Twenty	Nominated	
Grand Bell Awards	2015	Popularity Award	Twenty	Nominated	
KBS Drama Awards	2012	Best New Actress	The Innocent Man	Nominated	
MBC Drama Awards	2013	Best New Actress	Gu Family Book	Nominated	
MBC Drama Awards	2015	Excellence Award, Actress in a Miniseries	Scholar Who Walks The Night	Nominated	
MBC Drama Awards	2015	Best New Actress in a Miniseries	Scholar Who Walks The Night	Won	
MBC Entertainment Awards	2018	Rookie Award in Variety Category	Real Man 300	Nominated	
7th Mnet 20's Choice Awards	2013	20's Booming Star - Female	Gu Family Book and The Innocent Man	Won	
SBS Drama Awards	2014	New Star Award	Pinocchio	Won	
SBS Drama Awards	2023	Excellence Award, Actress in a Miniseries Genre/Action Drama	The Escape of the Seven	Won	
