= Oh Yoon-ah =

South Korean actress (born 1980)

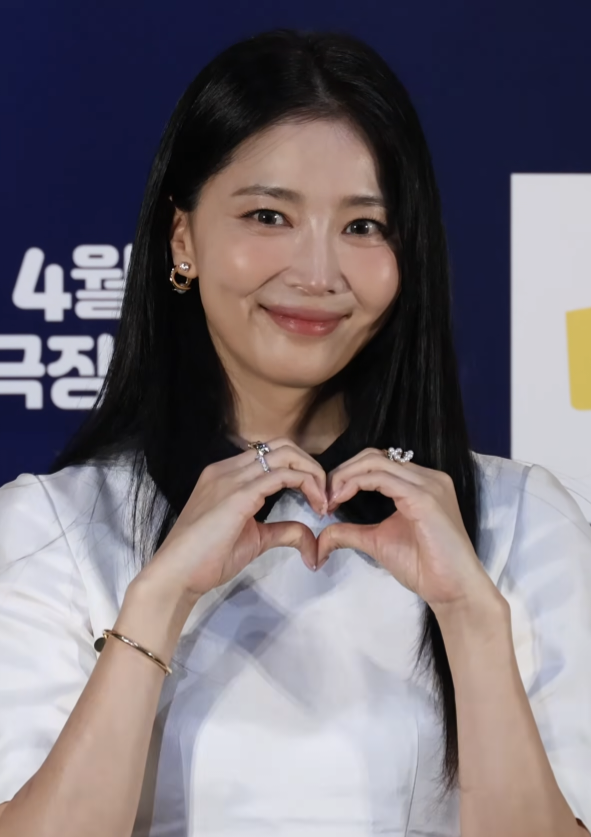
- Oh in April 2026
- Born: 21 November 1980 (age 45); Ulsan, South Korea
- Occupations: Actress; model
- Years active: 2003–present
- Agent(s): YA Entertainment; Sandbox Network (YouTube)
- Spouses: Song Hoon (m. 2007; div. 2015); Unknown (m. 2026)
- Children: 1

Korean name
- Hangul: 오윤아
- RR: O Yuna
- MR: O Yuna

Oh Yoon-ah (Korean: 오윤아) is a South Korean actress and a former racing model.

== Career ==
Oh Yoon-ah began her career as a racing model ("race queen" or "pit babe"), and in 2000 she won the first Cyber Race Queen Contest. She became an entertainment reporter for MBC's Section TV in 2003. However, she was fired in a live interview where she stayed silent for 3 minutes.

Oh made her acting debut in 2004 TV series Into the Storm, but it was her supporting role as the heroine's friend in hit sitcom Old Miss Diary that made her into a household name. She continued acting on television, starring in That Woman, Mr. Goodbye, Surgeon Bong Dal-hee, Master of Study, Marry Me, Please, and notably Alone in Love, for which she won Best Supporting Actress at the 2006 SBS Drama Awards.

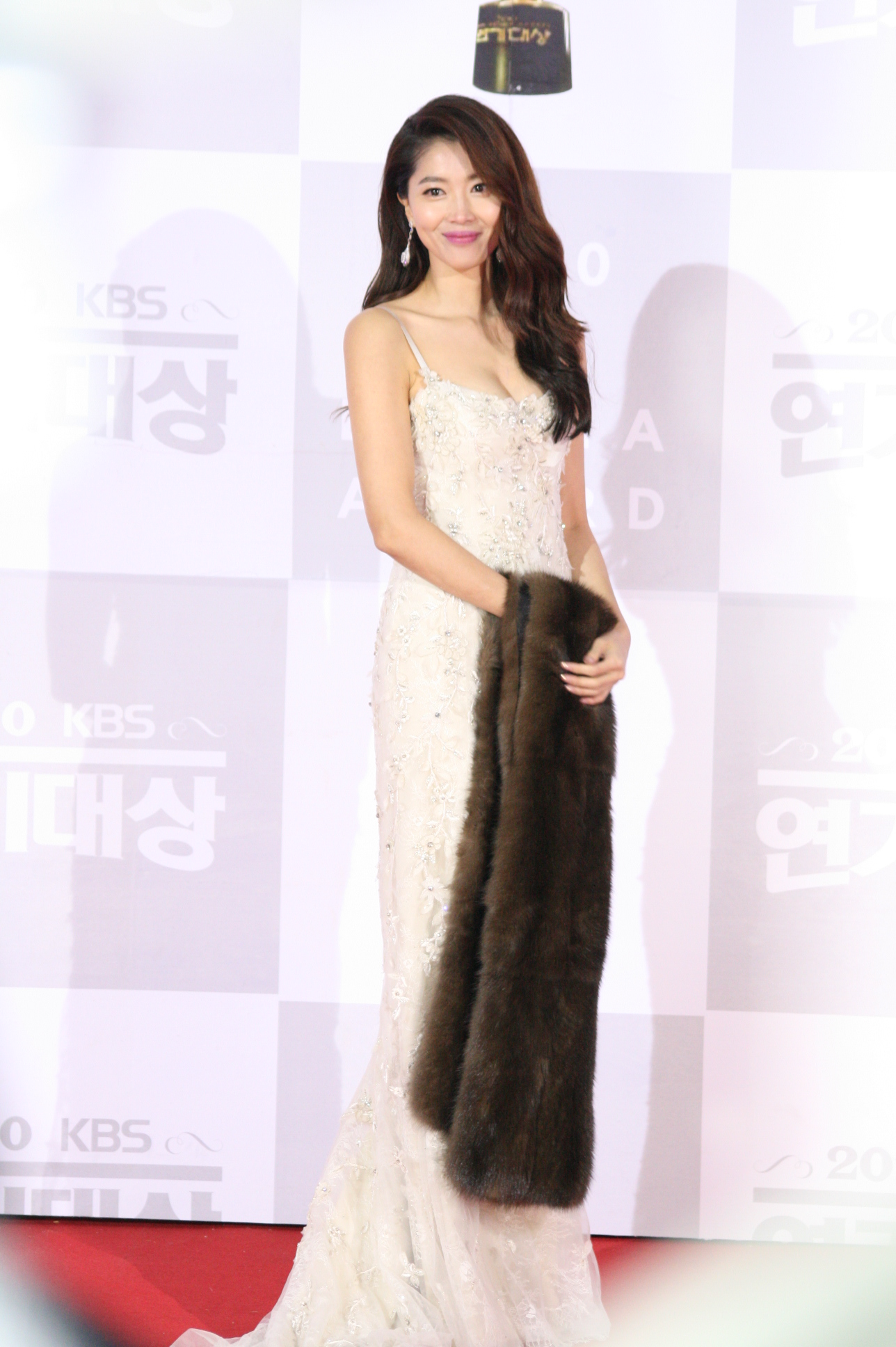
Oh at the 2010 KBS Drama Awards

== Personal life ==
Oh married advertising executive Song Hoon at Imperial Palace Hotel Seoul on January 5, 2007. The couple divorced in 2015; they have one son, born in August 2007. Oh and her son, who has autism, were featured together on the 10th anniversary cover of The Big Issue Korea to raise awareness for people with autism. Oh announced her remarriage on July 3, 2026.

On December 1, 2025, Oh announced the founding of her own agency, YA Entertainment.

== Filmography ==
=== Film ===
Year	Title	Role	Ref.
2005	Love in Magic	Kim Hyun-joo	
2006	Old Miss Diary - Movie	Oh Yoon-ah	
2019	Scent of a Ghost	Manager Park	
2021	The Cursed: Dead Man's Prey	Major company executive director	
TBA	Mismatch	Song Hye	

=== Television series ===
Year	Title	Role	Ref.
2004	Into the Storm		
2004	You'll Find Out	Oh Hye-ran	
2004	Old Miss Diary	Oh Yoon-ah, Mi-ja's friend	
2005	Hello My Teacher	Chae Eun-sung	
2005	That Woman	Oh Se-jung	
2006	HDTV Literature: "The Flag"	Lee Min-jae	
2006	Alone in Love	Kim Mi-yeon	
2006	Mr. Goodbye	Kang Soo-jin	
2006	Someday	Yoon Hye-young	
2007	Surgeon Bong Dal-hee	Jo Moon-kyung	
2008	Why Did You Come to My House?	Jang Bok-hee	
2008	The Kingdom of the Winds	Hye-ab, Moo-hyul's nurse	
2009	What's for Dinner?	Jo Young-mi	
2010	Master of Study	Jang Ma-ri	
2010	Marry Me, Please	Kim Yeon-ho	
2010	Athena: Goddess of War	Oh Sook-kyung	
2011	While You Were Sleeping	Go Hyun-sung	
2012	21st Century Family	Lee Geum-pyo	
2012	KBS Drama Special: "The Whereabouts of Noh Sook-ja"	Noh Sook-ja	
2012	My Kids Give Me a Headache	Lee Young-hyun	
2013	Incarnation of Money	Eun Bi-ryung	
2013	The Eldest	Lee Ji-sook	
2014	You're All Surrounded	Kim Sa-kyung	
2015	Angry Mom	Joo Ae-yeon	
2016	My Fair Lady	Yoo Joo-young	
2017	Saimdang, Memoir of Colors	Whieumdang Choi	
2017	Band of Sisters	Kim Eun-hyang	
2018	Yeonnam-dong 539	Yoon Yi-na	
2018	The Undateables	Coach Yang	
2018	A Pledge to God	Na-gyong	
2020	Hospital Playlist	Jung-won's second eldest sister (cameo)	
2020	Once Again	Song Ga-Hee	
2022	Fly High Butterfly	Michelle / Mi Sel	
2023	Queen of Masks	Ko Yu-na	

=== Variety shows ===
Year	Title	Notes	Ref.
2003	Section TV	Reporter	
2012	She and Him	MC	
2015	Look After My Dressing Table	MC	
2017	Swan Club	Cast	
2018	Real Man 300	Cast	
2020	Stars' Top Recipe at Fun-Staurant	Cast/contestant	
2021	Money Touch Me	Host	
2022	Hope TV SBS	Host with children	

=== Web shows ===
Year	Title	Role	Notes	Ref.
2021	Chinchin Golf	Host	with Hong Eun-hee	

=== Music video appearances ===
Year	Song title	Artist
2003	"Just One Night"	M

== Bibliography ==
Year	Title	Ref.
2006	1 Day Fitness: Oh Yoon-ah and Kim Min-chul's Fitness & Beauty Guide	

== Awards and nominations ==
Award	Year	Category	Nominated work	Result	Ref.
Cyber Racing Queen Contest	2000	—N/a	—N/a	Won	
SBS Drama Awards	2006	Best Supporting Actress in a Miniseries	Alone in Love	Won	
KBS Drama Awards	2006	Best Supporting Actress	Mr. Goodbye	Nominated	
KBS Drama Awards	2006	Excellence Award, Actress in a One-Act Drama/Special	The Flag	Nominated	
KBS Drama Awards	2010	Excellence Award, Actress in a Miniseries	Master of Study	Nominated	
KBS Drama Awards	2010	Excellence Award, Actress in a Daily Drama	Marry Me, Please	Nominated	
SBS Drama Awards	2011	Excellence Award, Actress in a Weekend/Daily Drama	While You Were Sleeping	Nominated	
SBS Drama Awards	2013	Special Acting Award, Actress in a Drama Special	Incarnation of Money	Nominated	
SBS Drama Awards	2014	Special Acting Award, Actress in a Drama Special	You're All Surrounded	Nominated	
MBC Drama Awards	2015	Excellence Award, Actress in a Miniseries	Angry Mom	Nominated	
KBS Drama Awards	2016	Best Supporting Actress	My Fair Lady	Nominated	
SBS Drama Awards	2017	Excellence Award, Actress in a Wednesday–Thursday Drama	Saimdang, Memoir of Colors	Nominated	
MBC Drama Awards	2018	Excellence Award, Actress in a Weekend Special Project	A Pledge to God	Nominated	
MBC Entertainment Awards	2018	Excellence Award in Variety Category	Real Man 300	Nominated	
18th KBS Entertainment Awards	2020	Best Entertainer Award in Reality Category	Stars' Top Recipe at Fun-Staurant	Won	
18th KBS Entertainment Awards	2020	Excellence Award in Reality Category	Stars' Top Recipe at Fun-Staurant	Nominated	
34th KBS Drama Awards	2020	Best Supporting Actress	Once Again	Won	
19th KBS Entertainment Awards	2021	Excellence Award in Reality Category	Stars' Top Recipe at Fun-Staurant	Won	
