= Jun Hyun-moo =

South Korean television host (born 1977)

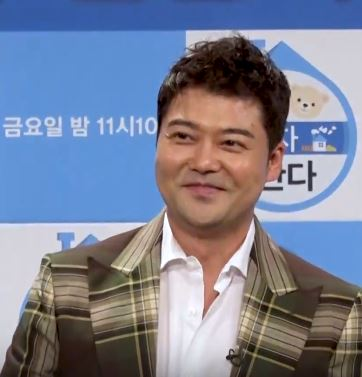
- Jun in 2018
- Born: November 7, 1977 (age 49); Seoul, South Korea
- Education: Yonsei University (Sociology and English Literature)
- Occupation: Host
- Agent: S.M. Culture & Contents

Korean name
- Hangul: 전현무
- Hanja: 全炫茂
- RR: Jeon Hyeonmu
- MR: Chŏn Hyŏnmu

Jun Hyun-moo (Korean: 전현무; born November 7, 1977) is a South Korean host and television personality. Before becoming a host, he was a KBS news anchor and radio announcer.

== Education ==
Jeon graduated from Yonsei University with a degree in Sociology and English Literature.

== Career ==
In 2026, Jeon made a special appearance in Netflix original series Can This Love Be Translated? A romantic comedy that follows the relationship between Joo Ho-jin (Kim Seon-ho), a multilingual interpreter, and Cha Mu-hee (Go Youn-jung) a top actress. He acted as himself in a scene where he interviewed top actress Cha.

== Philanthropy ==
Jun also donated 100 million won to single mothers in 2018 and joined the Seoul Fruit of Love Honor Society.

In 2019, Jun donated 50 million won to help victims of the Gangwon wildfires and in 2020 he donated 100 million won to low-income families struggling with COVID-19. He also donated 10 million won to teenagers to help them generate self-sufficiency through the Free Market.

On March 7, 2022, Jun donated 100 million won to support emergency relief for forest fire victims through Community Chest Korea (hereinafter referred to as the fruit of love).

In November 2025, he donated KRW 100 million to Yonsei University Health System (YUHS) to mark his birthday.

== Filmography ==
=== Television shows ===
==== Current ====
Year	Network	Title	Role
2016 – present	tvN	Free 19	Host
2018 – present	MBC	Omniscient Interfering View	Cast member
2019 – present	KBS	Boss in the Mirror	Host
2013 – 2019, 2021 – present	MBC	I Live Alone	Cast member
2022 – present	JTBC	Talk Pa One 25 o'clock	Host
2023 – present	TV Chosun	Dad and I	Host
2024–present	MBN	Jeon Hyun Moo Plan	Host
2024–present	MBC	Song Stealer	MC
2024–present	MBC Every1	Cheerful Golfer's Life Time Best Challenge	
2024–present	SBS Plus	Real Love Lab Poison Apple	Cast member
2024–present	SBS	The Magic Star	
2024–present	Channel A	upGRADE you: Teachers	
2024–present	ENA	Hyunmoo Case	
	MBC	Jeon Hyun Moo Plan 2	Host
	MBC	Class Beyond Border	Host
2025–present	KBS	Krazy Rich Korean	Host

==== Former Shows ====
Year	Title	Role
2008 – 2012	Vitamin	Host
2009 – 2010	Star Golden Bell	Host
2009 – 2011	I Love Movie	Host
2010 – 2011	Life Info Show	Host
2011 – 2012	Quiz Show The Four Musketeers	Host
2011 – 2012	Qualifications of Men	Cast Member
2012 – 2013	Imaginary Love Battle	Host
2012 – 2013	Blind Test 180°	Host
2012 – 2013	Three Idiots	Cast Member
2012–2020, 2022	Hidden Singer (Season 1 – 7)	Host
2013	Millionaire Game: My Turn	Host
2013	Splash	Host
2013	Miss Korea's Secret Garden	Host
2013	The Voice Kids	Host
2013 – 2014	Family Three Kingdom	Host
2013 – 2017	K-pop Star	Host
2013 – 2019	I Live Alone	Cast member
2014	Crime Scene 1	Cast Member
2014	Need More Romance	Host
2014 – 2015	Brave Writers	Host
2014 – 2017	Non - Summit	Host
2015	Dating Alone	Cast Member
2015 – 2016	Old House, New House	Cast Member
2015 – 2019	Wednesday Food Talk	Cast Member
2015 – 2020	Problematic Men	Cast member
2015 – 2020	Happy Together	Host
2016	Birth of a Song	Host
2016	Hit the Stage	Host
2016	Gold Medal Duty	Host
2016 – 17	Trick & True	Host
2016 – 17	Fantastic Duo (Season 1 – 2)	Host
2016 – 2020	Phantom Singer	Host
2017	Jobs	Host
2018	Unexpected Q	Host
2019	Tell Me	Host
2019	Hon-Life: Satisfaction Project	Host
2019	Stage K	Host
2019	Superband	Host
2019	Wednesday Music Playlist	Cast
2019 – 2021	Those Who Cross the Line	Host (season 2 – 4)
2019 – 2021	TMI News	Cast member
2021	Joseon Top Singer	Host
2021	Korea Idea League	Host
2021	Alphabet together	Cast Member; Chucheok Special
2021	The Grasshopper Playing with Ants	Host
2022	Hot Singers	Cast Member
2022	Youth Star	Host
2022	Sports Golden Bell	Host; with Seo Jang-hoon; Chuseok Special
2022	2022 Chuseok Special Idol Star Championship	Host; Chucheok Special
2022	Art Singer	Host
2022	National University is National University	Host
2022	Queen of Wrestling	Host
2022	literacy talks 2	Host
2022	Tomorrow is a genius	Host
2022	Embarrassment Season 4	Host
2022	Super Action	Host
2022	Over the Top	Host
2022	Crazy Tongue	Host
2023	Anbang Judge	lawyer
2023	Phantom Singer Season 4	Host
2023	My Friends Are Smarter Than Me	Host
2023	No Money No Art	Host
2023	Strong Heart VS	Host
2024	Fubao and installment plan 2	
2024	Real or Reel	Host
2024	Jeon Hyun Moo Plan	Host

=== Television series ===
Year	Title	Role
2011	Dream High	Broadcast host (cameo)
2012	What About Mom?	Secret agent (cameo)
2013	Sit Kong Royal Villa	
2013	Reply 1994	Haitai's junior (cameo)
2014	Plus Nine Boys	Jun Hyun-moo (cameo)
2015	The Producers	Jun Hyun-moo (cameo)
2015	Flower of Queen	MC of Find the Best Chef (cameo)
2016	Don't Dare to Dream	Candidate for an announcer role (ep8) (cameo)
2016	Sound of Your Heart	Himself (Ep.12) (cameo)
2016	KBS Drama Special: "Legendary Shuttle"	Uncle
2017	Let's Only Walk The Flower Road	The Five MC (Ep. 4)
2019	Beautiful Love, Wonderful Life	[Guest on Seol Ah's talk show] (Ep. 2)
2020	18 Again	Bae Seung-hyun (cameo)

=== Hosting ===
Event/ Show	Year	Notes	Ref.
Blue Dragon Series Awards	2022	with Im Yoon-ah	
Blue Dragon Series Awards	2023	with Im Yoon-ah	
Blue Dragon Series Awards	2024	with Im Yoon-ah	
Blue Dragon Series Awards	2025	with Im Yoon-ah	
Genie Music Awards	2022		
MBC Entertainment Awards	2016	with Kim Sung-joo and Lee Sung-kyung	
MBC Entertainment Awards	2018	with Seungri and Lee Hye-ri	
MBC Entertainment Awards	2019	with Hwasa and P.O	
MBC Entertainment Awards	2020	with Jang Do-yeon and Ahn Bo-hyun	
MBC Entertainment Awards	2021	with Lee Sang-yi and Kim Se-jeong	
MBC Entertainment Awards	2022	with Lee Yi-kyung and Kang Min-kyung	
MBC Entertainment Awards	2023	with Lee Se-young and Dex	
MBC Entertainment Awards	2024	with Yoon Eun-hye and Lee Jang-woo	
KBS Drama Awards	2011	with Han Hye-jin and Joo Won	
KBS Drama Awards	2015	with Park Bo-gum and Kim So-hyun	
KBS Drama Awards	2016	with Park Bo-gum and Kim Ji-won	
KBS Drama Awards	2018	with Uee	
KBS Drama Awards	2019	with Shin Hye-sun	
KBS Drama Awards	2022	with Lee Hye-ri and Jung Yong-hwa	
Seoul International Drama Awards	2023	with Lee Se-young	
The Fact Music Awards	2019	with Seohyun	
The Fact Music Awards	2020	with Seohyun	
The Fact Music Awards	2022	with Seohyun	
SBS Entertainment Awards	2024	with Jang Do-yeon and Lee Hyun-i	
SBS Entertainment Awards	2025	with Cha Tae-hyun and Lee Su-ji	

=== Web shows ===
Year	Title	Role	Ref.
2022	Love Catcher in Bali	Host	

== Accolades ==
=== Awards and nominations ===
Year	Award	Category	Nominated work	Result	Ref.
2009	KBS Entertainment Awards	Best Newcomer in a Variety Show	—N/a	Won	
2011	KBS Entertainment Awards	Top Entertainer Award	Qualifications of Men	Won	
2013	MBC Entertainment Awards	Excellence Award in Radio	Good Morning FM	Won	
2014	20th Korean Entertainment Art Awards	Best Radio Host	Good Morning FM	Won	
2014	22nd Korea Culture and Entertainment Awards	Grand Prize (Daesang) for MC	—N/a	Won	
2014	MBC Entertainment Awards	Excellence Award in Variety Show	I Live Alone	Won	
2015	51st Baeksang Arts Awards	Best Male Variety Performer	Non-Summit, I Live Alone	Won	
2016	KBS Entertainment Awards	Excellence Award in Talk Show	Happy Together Season 3	Won	
2016	SBS Entertainment Awards	Excellence Award in Talk Show	Fantastic Duo, K-pop Star 6	Won	
2016	MBC Entertainment Awards	Special Award in Variety Show	I Live Alone	Won	
2016	tvN10 Awards	Best MC	Problematic Man	Nominated	
2017	MBC Entertainment Awards	Grand Prize (Daesang)	I Live Alone	Won	
2017	SBS Entertainment Awards	Best MC in Entertainment	Fantastic Duo, K-pop Star 6, Master Key	Won	
2018	54th Baeksang Arts Awards	Best Variety Performer – Male	I Live Alone	Nominated	
2018	18th MBC Entertainment Awards	Entertainer of the Year	I Live Alone; Omniscient Interfering View; Unexpected Q	Won	
2019	55th Baeksang Arts Awards	Best Variety Performer – Male	I Live Alone	Won	
2019	19th MBC Entertainment Awards	Entertainer of the Year	Omniscient Interfering View; Those Who Cross the Line	Won	
2021	19th KBS Entertainment Awards	Entertainer of the Year	Boss in the Mirror	Won	
2021	21st MBC Entertainment Awards	Entertainer of the Year	Omniscient Interfering View; Those Who Cross the Line: Master X I Live Alone	Won	
2022	Korea Broadcasting Prizes	Best Entertainer	Omniscient Interfering View	Won	
2022	22nd MBC Entertainment Awards	Grand Prize (Daesang)	I Live Alone, Omniscient Interfering View	Won	
2022	22nd MBC Entertainment Awards	Entertainer of the Year	I Live Alone, Omniscient Interfering View	Won	
2022	22nd MBC Entertainment Awards	Best Couple Award with Lee Jang-woo and Park Na-rae	I Live Alone	Won	
2023	59th Baeksang Arts Awards	Best Male Variety Performer	I Live Alone, Omniscient Interfering View	Nominated	
2024	24th MBC Entertainment Awards	Grand Prize (Daesang)	I Live Alone, Omniscient Interfering View	Won	
2024	24th MBC Entertainment Awards	Entertainer of the Year	I Live Alone, Omniscient Interfering View	Won	
2025	23rd KBS Entertainment Awards	Grand Prize (Daesang)	Boss in the Mirror, Krazy Rich Korean	Won	
2025	23rd KBS Entertainment Awards	Entertainer of the Year	Boss in the Mirror, Krazy Rich Korean	Won	
2025	SBS Entertainment Awards	Producer Award	The Ballad of Us	Won	

=== State honors ===
Name of country, year given, and name of honor
Country	Ceremony	Year	Honor Or Award	Ref.
South Korea	Korean Popular Culture and Arts Awards (Note: Honors are given at the Korean Popular Culture and Arts Awards, arranged by the Korea Creative Content Agency and hosted by the Ministry of Culture, Sports and Tourism. They are awarded to those who have contributed to the arts and South Korea's pop culture.)	2018	Prime Minister's Commendation	

=== Listicles ===
Name of publisher, year listed, name of listicle, and placement
Publisher	Year	Listicle	Placement	Ref.
Forbes	2016	Korea Power Celebrity 40	36th	
Forbes	2017	Korea Power Celebrity 40	35th	
Forbes	2018	Korea Power Celebrity 40	18th	
Forbes	2019	Korea Power Celebrity 40	17th	
Forbes	2020	Korea Power Celebrity 40	6th	
Forbes	2025	Korea Power Celebrity 40	4th	
Forbes	2026	Korea Power Celebrity 40	15th	
