= Gamst (YouTuber) =

South Korean YouTuber (born 1990)

감스트GAMST
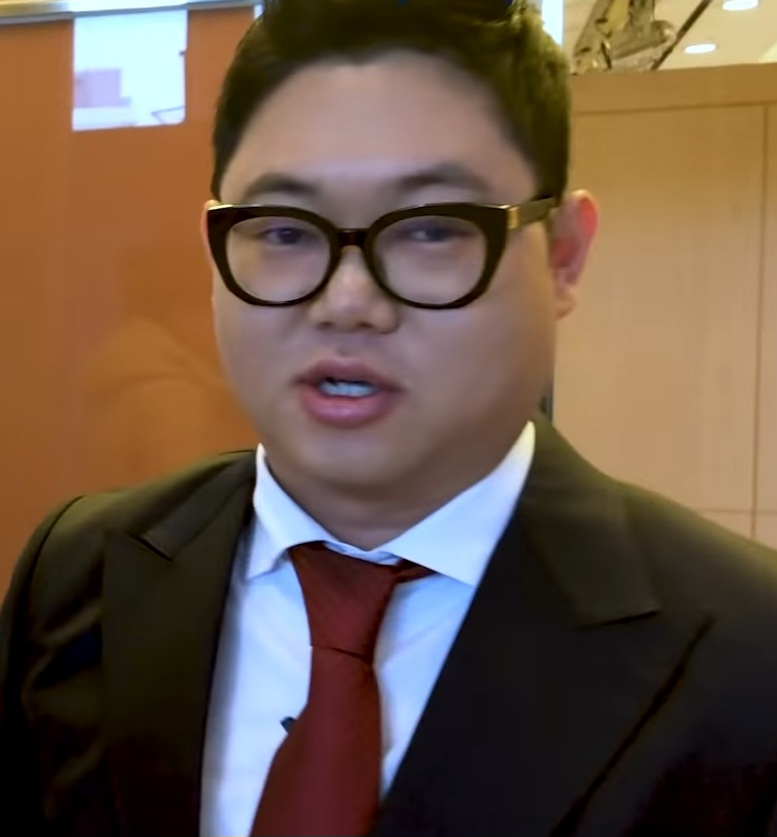
- Gamst in 2018
- Born: Kim In-jik; January 8, 1990 (age 36); Jangseong County, South Jeolla Province, South Korea
- Occupations: YouTuber; streamer; Football commentator

YouTube information
- Channel: 감스트GAMST
- Years active: 2012–active (streamer)
- Subscribers: 2.91 million

Korean name
- Hangul: 김인직
- Hanja: 金仁直
- RR: Gim Injik
- MR: Kim Injik
- Last updated: September 2025

Kim In-jik (Korean: 김인직, born January 8, 1990), known online by the handle Gamst (감스트) is a South Korean YouTuber and live streamer who makes content often revolving around football. He is also well known as the most famous Manchester United F.C. supporter in South Korea.

== Career ==
Gamst began broadcasting on AfreecaTV (now called Soop) on FIFA Online 2 BJ in February 2012. The nickname "Gamst" is derived from Norwegian footballer Morten Gamst Pedersen. In late 2013, he stopped broadcasting on his own to try comedy, but in 2015, he returned to broadcasting on his own. Since 2016, he has recruited members such as Chang-geun and Hwan-gyong to Gam Company and won the AfreecaTV Grand Prize through visible radio content.

He was recruited as a goodwill ambassador for the K-League ahead of the 2018 season. Since being appointed, he has conducted content such as joint broadcasting with soccer players, visiting K-League stadiums, and participating in K-League commentary. He was a digital commentator for Munhwa Broadcasting Corporation (MBC) at the 2018 FIFA World Cup and the 2018 Asian Games. Gamst won a special award at the 2018 K-League Awards, showing such vigorous activities in the football field. He has also appeared on terrestrial broadcasting since 2018, appearing as a guest of the entertainment Radio Star, and as a cameo of drama Secrets and Lies. He also participated in the Real Man 300 - Special Warfare School. For such activities, Gamst won the 2018 MBC Entertainment Awards for Best New Male Artist in Variety.

Prior to the 2019 season, he continued to serve as ambassador for the K-League. On 26 March 2019, he participated in a friendly match between the South Korea national football team and the Colombia national football team. However, Gamst was criticized for his poor broadcasting skills and apologized after the end of the match, acknowledging his lack of skills. In April 2019, Afreeca TV BJs, Oejilhye, Namsoon and Narakz, formed a crew. However, in June 2019, Narakz accused Gamst of sexual harassment, and Gamst apologized for it and dropped out of the K-League promotional ambassador program and went into self-reflection. He returned in August 2019, two months later. After his return, he has been mostly involved in League of Legends content.

He is a loyal fan of Manchester United, and hosts livestreams to watch United games with viewers through his personal broadcast. He broadcast and watched all Manchester United games in the 2023–24 season through his personal broadcast. Among them, his angry reactions became a hot topic in European media.

== See also ==
- Lilka
