= The Scholar Who Walks the Night =

2015 South Korean TV series

- Genre: Historical; Fantasy; Romance
- Based on: Scholar Who Walks the Night by Jo Joo-hee and Han Seung-hee
- Written by: Jang Hyun-joo
- Directed by: Lee Sung-joon
- Starring: Lee Joon-gi; Lee Yu-bi; Shim Chang-min; Lee Soo-hyuk; Kim So-eun
- Composer: Oh Joon Sung (오준성)
- Country of origin: South Korea
- Original language: Korean
- No. of episodes: 20

Production
- Running time: 60 minutes
- Production company: Content K

Original release
- Network: Munhwa Broadcasting Corporation
- Release: July 8 – September 10, 2015

The Scholar Who Walks the Night (Korean: 밤을 걷는 선비; RR: Bameul geonneun seonbi) is a 2015 South Korean television series based on the manhwa of the same name written by Jo Joo-hee and illustrated by Han Seung-hee. Starring Lee Joon-gi, Lee Yu-bi, Shim Chang-min, Lee Soo-hyuk, and Kim So-eun, it aired on MBC from July 8 to September 10, 2015 on Wednesdays and Thursdays at 21:55 for 20 episodes.

The drama reunited Lee Joon-gi and Kim So-eun who both starred in the 2006 film, Fly, Daddy, Fly.

== Synopsis ==
Set in an alternate Joseon dynasty, Jo Yang-sun (Lee Yu-bi) is the daughter of a nobleman whose family loses everything when her father is framed for treason. To make ends meet, Yang-sun begins cross-dressing as a male bookseller and meets the handsome and mysterious scholar Kim Sung-yeol (Lee Joon-gi), who works at the Hongmungwan. Kim Sung-yeol has spent 120 years as a guardian vampire who is responsible for getting rid of any vampire who disobeys the rules. As a guardian vampire, he is able to go out in sunlight as long as he wears his special black robe. Sung-yeol continues to be haunted by the long-ago death of his first love, Lee Myung-hee (Kim So-eun), who sacrificed herself for him 120 years ago. Sung-yeol decides to pay Yang-sun a high price if she is able to find the memorandum of his best friend, the late Crown Prince Jonghyun, which contains the secret to killing Gwi (Lee Soo-hyuk) and avenge the death of his family and lover. After the second meeting with Yang-sun, Sung-yeol finds out that Yang-sun is a girl. However, he decides to keep it as a secret to avoid awkwardness with Yang-sun. Yang-sun tries very hard to find the memorandum as she promised since she also needs money to cure her sister's leg.

On a trip to find the old book seller from Yuan with Yang-sun, Sung-yeol meets Choi Hye-ryung, Myung-hee's present-day doppelgänger who is an aloof nobleman's daughter. Hye-ryung's father is a Right Minister of the king. He has the highest authority in the king's court compared to other ministers. He has also been loyally serving Gwi for a long time. In order to prove his loyalty, he even sacrificed Hye-ryung when she was 10 years old to become Gwi's food toy. However, due to her loyalty and gentle treatment towards Gwi, he has unconsciously fallen in love with Hye-ryung and secretly plans to change her into a vampire, even though he already has 100% control of the royal court. Gwi resides in the underground royal palace and uses his powers and political machinations to prevent Crown Prince Lee Yoon (Shim Chang-min) from ascending to the throne, as he knows that Crown Prince Lee Yoon is secretly planning to get rid of him like his late ancestor, Crown Prince Jonghyun.

Gwi is also aware of Sung-yeol's plan to kill him. He becomes furious when he learns that Sung-yeol has gotten close to finding the secret to killing him. Gwi tries to harm Yang-sun several times, but Sung-yeol was able to save Yang-sun since Sung-yeol also has the ability to sense Gwi's presence. Gwi becomes anxious after he smells Yang-sun's blood and decides to get rid of Yang-sun as a precaution. After a while, Sung-yeol secretly falls in love with Yang-sun after he discovers that Hye-ryung is one of Gwi's followers.

Jo Seung, Yang-sun's adopted father, is the secret keeper of the Crown Prince Jonghyun's memorandum. Jo Seung is a former servant of Yang-sun's biological father, Lord Seo Jung Do, who served the Crown Prince Lee Yoon's late father, Crown Prince Sadong, as his Right Minister. Jo Seung was changed into vampire by Gwi as a punishment and tries to harm Yang-sun. Unbeknownst to Sung-yeol, Yang-sun was saved by him 10 years ago and Sung-yeol killed Yang-sun's father in order to save her. Although she has been bitten by her father, Yang-sun/Seo-jin did not change into a vampire because she has the blood of Gwi. Yang-sun's biological mother is the direct descendant of Gwi from her mother's side. Her biological mother had raised her as a boy in order to protect her because she knows that her daughter needs to be sacrificed as a weapon to kill Gwi.

What is the secret plan in the Crown Prince Jonghyun's memorandum? How can Sung-yeol save Yang-sun from being sacrificed? Will Lee Yoon become a puppet king controlled by Gwi like his ancestor? Will Sang-yeol and Yang-sun be able to live happily ever after?

== Cast ==
=== Main ===
- Lee Joon-gi as Kim Sung-yeol ("Night Scholar")

A loyal and courageous scholar who is a close friend of Crown Prince Jonghyun. He turns into a vengeful vampire following the deaths of his family and friend.

- Lee Yu-bi as Jo Yang-sun/Seo Jin

A cheerful and kind bookseller, who goes around dressed as a man in order to earn money for her family. She is the direct descendant of Gwi from her mother's side.

- Shim Chang-min as Crown Prince Lee Yoon

The son of Crown Prince Sadong. He seeks to take revenge on Gwi, who was responsible for the death of his father.

- Lee Soo-hyuk as Gwi

A bloodthirsty and evil vampire who wishes to rule over humans, who likes Choi Hye-ryung.

- Kim So-eun as Lee Myung-hee/Choi Hye-ryung (another character after 120 yrs)

Sung-yeol's first love and fiancée. She was deeply in love with Sung-yeol and she gave her life to save Sung-yeol.
Choi Hye-ryung is the daughter of the prime minister, who resembles Lee Myung and serves Gwi. She secretly falls in love with Prince Lee Yoon as she is striving to become Joseon's Queen as a revenge for her father.

=== Supporting ===
==== People around Sung-yeol ====
- Jang Hee-jin as Soo-hyang

The head of Hwayang-gak and one of Sung-yeol's confidant. She has a one-sided love for him since he was her savior.

- Choi Tae-hwan as Ho-jin

Sung-yeol's confidant and head of the household.

- Kwon Hwa-woon as Hyun-gyu

==== People around Lee Yoon ====
- Yeo Eui-joo as Noh Hak-yong

A Sungkyunkwan scholar and close friend of Lee Yoon.

- Han Jung-soo as Baek In-ho

Lee Yoon's martial arts teacher and personal guard. He is also a best friend of Crown Prince Sadong.

- Lee Soon-jae as King Hyeonjo

Lee Yoon's grandfather

- Jang Seung-jo as Crown Prince Sadong

Lee Yoon's father. He was killed by Gwi when he attempted to find the secret to kill Gwi to stop the Gwi's puppet king monarchy

==== People around Yang-sun ====
- Jung Gyu-soo as Jo-saeng

Yang-sun's foster father. He is sick and unable to work to support his family. He is the keeper of Crown Prince Jonghyun's memorandum.

- Oh Yoon-hong as Kkot-boon

Yang-sun's foster mother

- Park So-young as Dam-yi

Yang Sun's sister. She is unable to walk.

==== Court officials ====
- Son Jong-hak as Choi Chul-joong

The prime minister who is the main opposer to the King and Crown Prince. He is the father of Hye-ryung.

- Kim Myung-gon as Noh Chang-sun

The chief left minister who supports the King and is one of his close confidants. He is the grandfather of Hak-yong.

- Kim Jong-goo

The defense minister who is the prime minister's associate.

=== Special appearances ===
- Lee Hyun-woo as Crown Prince Jonghyun (cameo, episode 1)

The original "Lustful Student", who wanted to get rid of Gwi, but was killed in the process.

- Yang Ik-june as Hae-seo (cameo, episode 1)

The Guardian Gwi.

- Han Ji-woo as Royal Concubine Kim (cameo, episode 1)
- Park Ji-il as Kim Sung-yeol's father (cameo, episode 1)
- Kim Ye-ryeong as Kim Sung-yeol's mother (cameo, episode 1)
- Lee Ho-jae as King Moonjo, Crown Prince Jonghyun's father. (cameo, episode 1)

== Production ==
An accident while filming on set (simply described by producers as "a fall") on June 10, 2015 caused both Lee Joon-gi and Lee Yu-bi to be hospitalized, for a nasal fracture and a herniated lumbar disc, respectively.

== Original soundtrack ==
The Scholar who walks the night OST

Soundtrack album by Various artists
- Recorded: 2015
- Genre: Soundtrack
- Languages: Korean; English
- Labels: Vitamin Entertainment; Music Store Company

=== Part 1 ===
Released on July 16, 2015
No.	Title	Artist	Length
1.	"Secret Paradise" (비밀낙원)	Jang Jae-in	3:10
2.	"Secret Paradise" (Inst.)		3:10
Total length:			6:20

=== Part 2 ===
Released on July 23, 2015
No.	Title	Artist	Length
1.	"Sad Wind" (슬픈 바람)	Eun Ga Eun	4:12
2.	"Sad Wind" (Inst.)		4:12
Total length:			8:24

=== Part 3 ===
Released on July 30, 2015
No.	Title	Artist	Length
1.	"Loving you again" (또사랑아고만다)	Yook Sung-jae (BTOB)	3:40
2.	"Loving you again" (Inst.)		3:40
Total length:			8:20

=== Part 4 ===
Released on August 20, 2015
No.	Title	Artist	Length
1.	"Don't Cry" (울지마라)	G.NA	4:16
2.	"Don't Cry" (Inst.)		4:16
Total length:			8:32

=== Part 5 ===
Released on August 27, 2015
No.	Title	Artist	Length
1.	"Without you" (너없이)	Beast	3:47
2.	"Without you" (Inst.)		3:47
Total length:			8:44

=== Part 6 ===
Released on September 9, 2015
No.	Title	Artist	Length
1.	"Addiction" (중독)	KimBo	4:02
2.	"Addiction" (Inst.)		4:02
Total length:			8:04

Disc 2:
No.	Title	Artist	Length
1.	"Endless Run" (Opening Title)	Oh Joon Sung	2:31
2.	"Awaken Vampire"	Oh Joon Sung	2:49
3.	"Broken Door"	Oh Joon Sung	2:06
4.	"Brave Hand"	Oh Joon Sung	2:25
5.	"Black cloud"	Oh Joon Sung	2:22
6.	"Flying Hero"	Oh Joon Sung	2:11
7.	"Hidden Heart"	Oh Joon Sung	2:29
8.	"Hot Tension"	Oh Joon Sung	2:10
9.	"I am a Prince"	Oh Joon Sung	2:02
10.	"In the forest"	Oh Joon Sung	1:58
11.	"Inside Fighter"	Oh Joon Sung	1:58
12.	"Keep the Faith"	Oh Joon Sung	2:18
13.	"Morning Dew"	Oh Joon Sung	3:02
14.	"Night World"	Oh Joon Sung	2:30
15.	"Old Rival"	Oh Joon Sung	2:18
16.	"Sadness of Vampire"	Oh Joon Sung	2:45
17.	"Trans-Vampire"	Oh Joon Sung	2:12
18.	"Too Fast"	Oh Joon Sung	2:28
19.	"The Dark Palace"	Oh Joon Sung	2:04
20.	"Tears of the flower"	Oh Joon Sung	2:34
21.	"Unbroken"	Oh Joon Sung	2:21
22.	"Wait for you"	Oh Joon Sung	1:59
23.	"Walk a Night"	Oh Joon Sung	1:34
24.	"Where are you going?"	Oh Joon Sung	2:29
25.	"Waltz of Memory"	Oh Joon Sung	2:37

== Ratings ==
Episode	Broadcast date	TNmS ratings		AGB Nielsen ratings	
Episode	Broadcast date	Nationwide	Seoul Capital Area	Nationwide	Seoul Capital Area
1	July 8, 2015	7.4%	9.1%	7.7%	8.1%
2	July 9, 2015	6.8%	8.9%	6.8%	7.3%
3	July 15, 2015	7.2%	9.1%	7.7%	7.8%
4	July 16, 2015	7.1%	8.2%	7.7%	8.5%
5	July 22, 2015	7.3%	9.0%	7.8%	8.9%
6	July 23, 2015	6.4%	7.5%	7.9%	8.7%
7	July 29, 2015	6.9%	8.0%	7.9%	8.3%
8	July 30, 2015	7.3%	7.9%	7.4%	7.8%
9	August 5, 2015	7.4%	8.7%	8.5%	8.6%
10	August 6, 2015	6.5%	7.5%	7.4%	7.4%
11	August 12, 2015	6.5%	7.7%	6.9%	6.8%
12	August 13, 2015	6.3%	7.1%	7.4%	7.1%
13	August 19, 2015	7.3%	7.9%	7.6%	7.3%
14	August 20, 2015	6.6%	7.2%	7.0%	7.5%
15	August 26, 2015	6.5%	7.1%	6.5%	6.5%
16	August 27, 2015	5.9%	6.6%	6.8%	6.9%
17	September 2, 2015	7.2%	7.9%	8.0%	7.8%
18	September 3, 2015	7.1%	7.8%	7.9%	8.0%
19	September 9, 2015	7.3%	8.3%	6.2%	9.3%
20	September 10, 2015	7.2%	8.0%	7.7%	7.9%
Average		6.9%	8.0%	7.4%	7.8%

Key

- Blue-lowest rating episode
- Red-highest rating episode
- N/A-(Information) Not Available

== Awards and nominations ==
Year	Award	Category	Recipient	Result
2015	MBC Drama Awards	Top Excellence Award, Actor in a Miniseries	Lee Joon-gi	Nominated
2015	MBC Drama Awards	Excellence Award, Actress in a Miniseries	Lee Yu-bi	Nominated
2015	MBC Drama Awards	Best New Actor in a Miniseries	Lee Soo-hyuk	Won
2015	MBC Drama Awards	Best New Actress in a Miniseries	Lee Yu-bi	Won
2015	MBC Drama Awards	Top 10 Stars Award	Lee Joon-gi	Won
2016	4th Annual DramaFever Awards	Best Historical Drama	The Scholar Who Walks the Night	Won

== See also ==
- List of vampire television series
