= Kim Gook-jin =

South Korean comedian and presenter

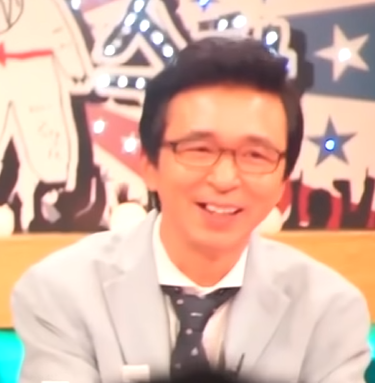
- Kim hosting radio star in 2018
- Born: February 6, 1965 (age 61); Inje County, South Korea
- Spouse: Kang Susie (m. 2018)

Comedy career
- Years active: 1985–present
- Medium: Stand-up, television
- Genres: Observational, Sketch, Wit, Parody, Slapstick, Dramatic, Sitcom

Korean name
- Hangul: 김국진
- RR: Gim Gukjin
- MR: Kim Kukchin

Kim Gook-jin (born February 6, 1965), is a South Korean comedian and presenter. In September 2009, he became the host of MBC's Radio Star.

== Filmography ==
=== Television series ===
- Reply 1997 (tvN, 2012)
- Hilarious Housewives (MBC, 2009)
- Kokkiri (MBC, 2008)
- I Really Really Like You (MBC, 2006)
- Dal-Joong's Cinderella (KBS2, 2003)
- Lovers (MBC, 2001)
- Sweet Bear (MBC, 2001)

=== Television shows ===
Year	Title	Role	Notes	Ref.
2022	Let's Eat GO	Cast Member		

== Awards and nominations ==
- Won Producer's Choice MC Award in 2010 SBS Entertainment Awards
- Nominated for Netizen Popularity Award in 2011 SBS Entertainment Awards
