= Mom's Touch =

Fast food chain

- Native name: 맘스터치
- Romanized name: Mamseu Teochi
- Type: Private
- Industry: Fast food
- Founded: South Korea (1997; 29 years ago)
- Headquarters: Seoul, South Korea
- Number of locations: ▲1400+ stores (2025)
- Area served: South Korea; Japan; Mongolia; Thailand; Singapore
- Products: Burgers; fried chicken; rice cakes; fried shrimp; french fries; cheese balls; gim-tteok-man; salads; soft drinks; juices
- Owner: MOM'S TOUCH&Co.
- Website: momstouch.co.kr

Mom's Touch (Korean: 맘스터치) is a South Korean fast food chain, based in Seoul, South Korea. As of 2025, the chain had over 1400 retail stores nationwide. It operates restaurants in countries such as Thailand, Mongolia, and Japan. The company's name comes from the thought that their food is made the same way a mother would make for her family.

== History ==
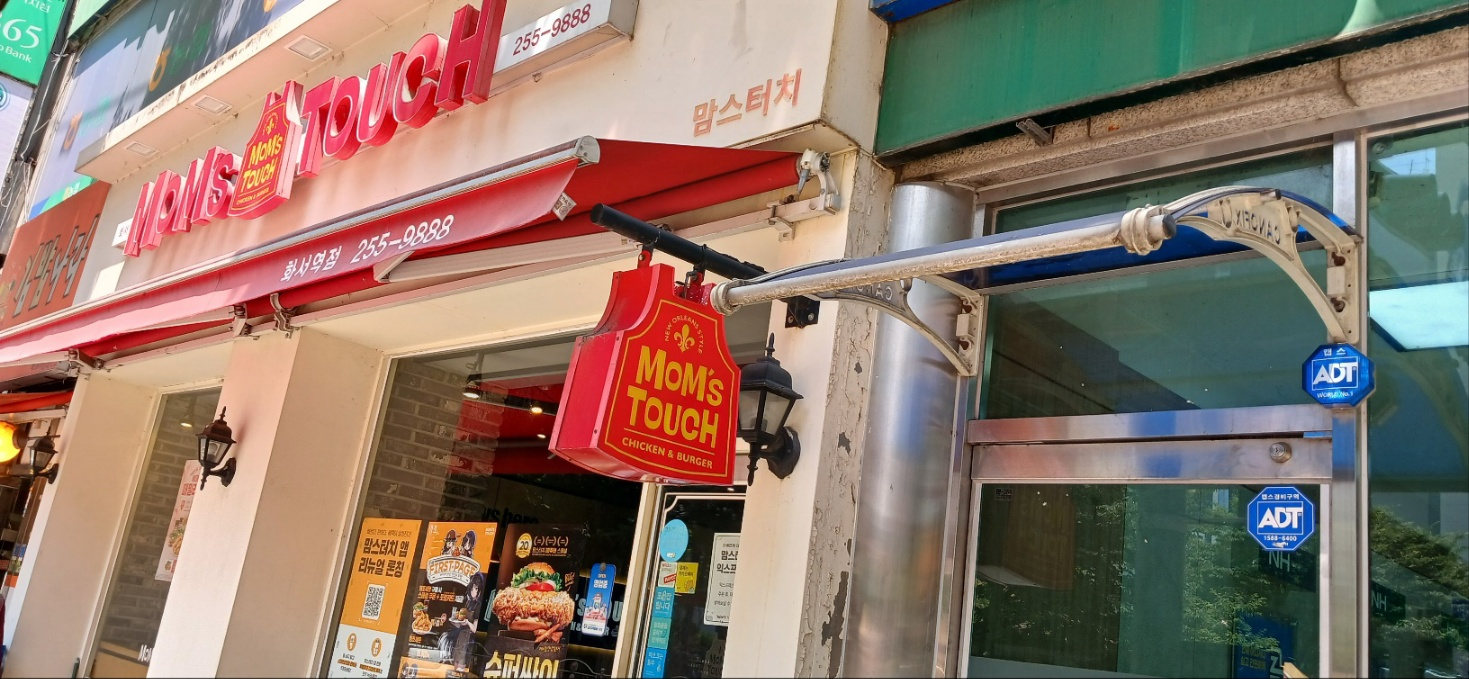
Mom's Touch restaurant in South Korea, with its old branding as seen in the picture. 2024.

Mom's Touch was established in 1997 in Seoul. After that, in order to restructure, CEO Chung Hyun-sik took over Mom's Touch in 2004 on condition that it took on a deficit and spun it off into Haimarrow Food Service. It did not make operating profit from 2004 to 2010. It recorded $2.6 billion (26 billion KRW) in operating profit in 2013 and made its first profit for the first time. On November 5, 2019, Haimarrow Food Service, which runs Mom's Touch, was sold to private equity fund KL & Partners for 7.3 billion won. On January 1, 2018, Mom's Touch opened its first American store in Concord, California. In 2021, they changed the company name to Mom's Touch & Co.

They changed their existing red logo to a yellow logo. They have operating stores in South Korea, Mongolia and Thailand, in April 2024 they were due to open the first store in Shibuya, Japan.

As of August 2024, they no longer have any operation in the US after closing their City of Industry, CA location.

== Products ==
Mom's Touch main products are fried chicken wings, chicken burgers, and hamburgers. The fried chicken wings come in a variety of flavors such as spicy, chili pepper, honey, garlic, onion cheese, and curry. The chicken burger types include white garlic, chicken thigh burger, chicken filet burger, ham and cheese, jalapeño chicken burger, Cajun mango burger, and a spicy chicken burger. The hamburger types include a bulgogi burger, spicy bulgogi burger, and Jr. Burger.

Mom's Touch does not use trans fat oils or monosodium glutamate in their products.

Sides available include french fries, Yakimandu, fried shrimp, salads, and chicken wraps.

== Advertising ==
Mom's Touch advertising has predominantly relied on comedic television commercials. One commercial shows the small amount of food given by other companies then goes on to show how much bigger Mom's Touch portion sizes are.

They also were seen in some webtoons, notably Lookism, where many restaurants were drawn by Park Tae-jun.
