= Radio Star (talk show) =

Korean television program

- Promotional poster
- Hangul: 라디오스타
- RR: Radio seuta
- MR: Radio sŭt'a
- Genre: Talk show
- Written by: Kim Tae-hee; Park Hye-jin; Lee Da-ae; Byun Eun-jeong; Woo Eun-jeong; Nam In-young
- Directed by: Jeon Sung-ho; Hwang Ji-young; Hang Yong-rong; Choi Haeng-ho (Episode 562-TBA)
- Presented by: Kim Gook-jin; Kim Gu-ra; Yoo Se-yoon; Jang Do-yeon
- Opening theme: Modern Talking – Brother Louie Mix 98'
- Country of origin: South Korea
- Original language: Korean
- No. of seasons: 1
- No. of episodes: 956 (list of episodes)

Production
- Production location: South Korea
- Running time: 80 minutes

Original release
- Network: MBC
- Release: May 30, 2007 – present

Related
- Golden Fishery, Video Star

Radio Star (Korean: 라디오스타) is a South Korean talk show hosted by Kim Gook-jin, Kim Gu-ra, Yoo Se-yoon and Jang Do-yeon. It airs on MBC on Wednesdays at 10:30(KST). The first episode aired on May 30, 2007, making it one of the longest-running talk shows in the country.

== Cast ==
=== Host ===
- Current
  - Kim Gook-jin
  - Kim Gu-ra
  - Yoo Se-yoon
  - Jang Do-yeon
- Former
  - Shindong (Super Junior)
  - Shin Jung-hwan
  - Kim Hee-chul (Super Junior)
  - Cho Kyu-hyun (Super Junior)
  - Cha Tae-hyun
  - Yoon Jong-shin
  - Ahn Young-mi

== Ratings ==
In the ratings below, the highest rating for the show will be in red, and the lowest rating for the show will be in blue each year.

=== 2000s ===
List of ratings in 2007 (episode 1–29)
Ep. #	Original Airdate	TNmS Ratings	Nielsen Ratings
Ep. #	Original Airdate	Nationwide	
1	May 30	12.7%	12.1%
2	June 6	15.8%	14.3%
3	June 13	14.9%	14.0%
4	June 20	11.4%	10.5%
5	June 27	11.8%	11.8%
6	July 4	14.0%	12.4%
7	July 11	10.7%	11.2%
8	July 18	13.2%	12.5%
9	August 1	15.6%	15.2%
10	August 8	11.6%	11.6%
11	August 15	13.8%	13.8%
12	August 22	16.7%	16.7%
13	August 29	13.5%	12.2%
14	September 5	16.0%	13.9%
15	September 12	14.1%	12.6%
16	September 19	13.9%	13.9%
17	September 26	13.4%	12.2%
18	October 3	15.2%	15.2%
19	October 10	12.8%	12.8%
20	October 17	14.8%	12.8%
21	October 24	14.7%	14.7%
22	October 31	14.2%	13.8%
23	November 7	15.1%	14.2%
24	November 14	15.6%	15.2%
25	November 21	15.5%	14.1%
26	November 28	17.2%	15.6%
27	December 5	16.2%	14.3%
28	December 12	11.8%	10.8%
29	December 26	16.4%	16.0%

List of ratings in 2008 (episode 30–77)
Ep. #	Original Airdate	TNmS Ratings	Nielsen Ratings
Ep. #	Original Airdate	Nationwide	
30	January 2	18.5%	17.0%
31	January 9	18.8%	16.9%
32	January 16	18.6%	18.0%
33	January 23	16.2%	14.5%
34	January 30	17.3%	15.8%
35	February 6	16.0%	15.8%
36	February 9	10.8%	9.7%
37	February 13	17.4%	14.9%
38	February 20	15.8%	14.1%
39	February 27	18.1%	15.9%
40	March 5	15.0%	13.7%
41	March 12	12.7%	11.3%
42	March 19	12.2%	11.8%
43	March 26	15.5%	13.8%
44	April 2	12.5%	11.9%
45	April 16	13.7%	12.6%
46	April 23	12.5%	12.4%
47	April 30	14.0%	11.7%
48	May 7	13.1%	12.6%
49	May 14	13.1%	11.9%
50	May 21	14.1%	12.3%
51	May 28	15.7%	14.5%
52	June 4	12.3%	11.2%
53	June 11	13.7%	11.3%
54	June 18	14.4%	12.7%
55	June 25	10.4%	10.5%
56	July 2	14.4%	13.2%
57	July 9	14.9%	12.9%
58	July 16	14.5%	12.3%
59	July 23	14.4%	12.6%
60	July 30	15.3%	14.3%
61	August 13	16.8%	15.7%
62	September 3	16.0%	14.5%
63	September 17	17.5%	15.8%
64	September 24	16.1%	14.1%
65	October 1	17.1%	14.4%
66	October 8	16.7%	13.8%
67	October 15	17.6%	14.6%
68	October 22	21.7%	17.5%
69	October 29	13.1%	12.9%
70	November 5	14.1%	12.3%
71	November 12	17.2%	13.0%
72	November 19	13.2%	10.7%
73	November 26	14.8%	12.7%
74	December 3	16.9%	13.2%
75	December 10	16.1%	14.4%
76	December 17	14.5%	12.2%
77	December 24	14.8%	13.4%

List of ratings in 2009 (episode 78–124)
Ep. #	Original Airdate	TNmS Ratings	Nielsen Ratings
Ep. #	Original Airdate	Nationwide	
78	January 14	16.2%	13.6%
79	January 21	18.1%	16.6%
80	January 28	15.9%	14.0%
81	February 4	14.7%	14.3%
82	February 18	16.3%	15.2%
83	February 25	16.7%	14.5%
84	March 4	10.4%	10.2%
85	March 11	13.8%	12.5%
86	March 18	11.3%	12.4%
87	March 25	17.7%	16.3%
88	April 1	13.4%	11.9%
89	April 8	11.2%	9.8%
90	April 15	15.8%	14.3%
91	April 22	12.4%	11.0%
92	April 29	12.7%	12.2%
93	May 6	13.8%	12.1%
94	May 13	11.5%	12.0%
95	May 20	12.5%	10.3%
96	June 3	14.1%	11.8%
97	June 10	13.8%	12.8%
98	June 24	15.3%	13.4%
99	July 1	15.0%	13.5%
100	July 8	15.6%	12.8%
101	July 15	12.9%	12.7%
102	July 22	13.6%	12.3%
103	July 29	12.8%	11.8%
104	August 5	17.0%	13.9%
105	August 12	14.9%	15.0%
106	August 19	16.5%	15.6%
107	August 26	14.8%	14.5%
108	September 2	15.0%	13.9%
109	September 9	14.9%	11.4%
110	September 16	14.8%	13.1%
111	September 23	14.2%	13.7%
112	September 30	14.8%	14.6%
113	October 7	14.6%	13.9%
114	October 14	15.4%	15.2%
115	October 21	14.1%	13.9%
116	October 28	15.5%	14.8%
117	November 4	18.1%	17.3%
118	November 11	16.5%	14.1%
119	November 18	12.9%	12.4%
120	November 25	15.3%	15.6%
121	December 2	14.3%	13.2%
122	December 9	18.2%	15.5%
123	December 16	17.7%	15.1%
124	December 23	15.4%	14.3%

=== 2010s ===
List of ratings in 2010 (episode 125–167)
Ep. #	Original Airdate	TNmS Ratings	Nielsen Ratings
Ep. #	Original Airdate	Nationwide	
125	January 6	19.5%	17.8%
126	January 13	16.2%	15.0%
127	January 20	15.6%	14.6%
128	January 27	15.5%	16.6%
129	February 3	14 4%	13.7%
130	February 10	17.4%	18.3%
131	February 17	17.9%	18.2%
132	February 24	13.1%	13.2%
133	March 3	10.8%	9.9%
134	March 10	15.0%	14.4%
135	March 17	16.1%	16.0%
136	March 24	14.9%	15.5%
137	April 7	15.0%	14.8%
138	May 19	12.7%	12.9%
139	May 26	22.0%	20.6%
140	June 9	18.4%	15.6%
141	June 16	11.0%	11.4%
142	June 23	12.7%	12.2%
143	June 30	20.1%	16.7%
144	July 7	16.5%	15.5%
145	July 14	16.7%	15.0%
146	July 21	18.7%	16.1%
147	July 28	12.2%	11.6%
148	August 4	16.6%	15.2%
149	August 11	16.3%	13.7%
150	August 18	17.2%	14.5%
151	August 25	17.1%	16.8%
152	September 1	18.1%	16.1%
153	September 8	19.0%	15.2%
154	September 15	16.7%	14.8%
155	September 29	13.3%	12.5%
156	October 6	13.4%	12.5%
157	October 13	12.4%	12.4%
158	October 20	14.7%	14.2%
159	October 27	15.2%	14.2%
160	November 3	11.4%	12.8%
161	November 10	14.0%	14.1%
162	November 17	11.0%	12.8%
163	November 24	9.2%	9.0%
164	December 1	14.5%	13.3%
165	December 8	13.7%	14.4%
166	December 15	13.5%	14.1%
167	December 22	14.2%	14.6%

List of ratings in 2011 (episode 168–215)
Ep. #	Original Airdate	TNmS Ratings	Nielsen Ratings
Ep. #	Original Airdate	Nationwide	
168	January 5	19.7%	21.5%
169	January 12	13.9%	15.0%
170	January 19	13.0%	14.8%
171	January 26	14.3%	15.7%
172	February 2	8.7%	10.3%
173	February 9	15.7%	16.7%
174	February 16	16.7%	18.1%
175	February 23	17.1%	18.2%
176	March 2	11.9%	13.7%
177	March 9	11.5%	12.7%
178	March 16	7.8%	9.2%
179	March 23	11.9%	12.9%
180	March 30	12.7%	14.3%
181	April 6	12.2%	14.1%
182	April 13	10.7%	12.5%
183	April 20	11.5%	12.7%
184	April 27	11.2%	12.5%
185	May 4	11.6%	12.6%
186	May 11	11.2%	12.4%
187	May 18	10.0%	11.2%
188	May 25	12.3%	13.5%
189	June 1	11.9%	13.6%
190	June 8	13.3%	14.3%
191	June 15	13.1%	15.0%
192	June 22	11.4%	12.5%
193	June 29	10.0%	11.5%
194	July 13	12.6%	14.0%
195	July 20	13.0%	14.6%
196	July 27	12.6%	14.3%
197	August 3	14.5%	14.6%
198	August 10	11.4%	12.5%
199	August 17	12.1%	13.5%
200	August 24	8.9%	10.8%
201	August 31	9.2%	11.0%
202	September 7	10.9%	11.9%
203	September 14	11.0%	12.4%
204	September 28	8.8%	9.9%
205	October 5	7.0%	8.7%
206	October 19	8.8%	10.6%
207	October 26	8.1%	10.2%
208	November 2	8.8%	12.2%
209	November 9	9.2%	10.8%
210	November 16	8.8%	10.7%
211	November 23	9.2%	12.6%
212	November 30	8.5%	11.9%
213	December 7	10.2%	10.8%
214	December 14	9.0%	11.2%
215	December 21	9.4%	11.4%

List of ratings in 2012 (episode 216–261)
Ep. #	Original Airdate	TNmS Ratings	Nielsen Ratings
Ep. #	Original Airdate	Nationwide	
216	January 4	10.1%	11.0%
217	January 11	11.1%	11.7%
218	January 18	10.7%	11.9%
219	January 25	11.1%	13.0%
220	February 1	9.6%	12.2%
221	February 8	12.0%	13.0%
222	February 15	11.9%	13.8%
223	February 22	13.3%	12.6%
224	February 29	11.4%	14.1%
225	March 7	11.5%	10.3%
226	March 14	11.6%	13.5%
227	March 21	8.9%	9.8%
228	March 28	8.8%	8.6%
229	April 18	8.0%	7.9%
230	April 25	8.9%	8.9%
231	May 2	8.3%	9.4%
232	May 9	7.0%	8.4%
233	May 16	7.1%	8.8%
234	May 23	7.4%	7.9%
235	May 30	7.6%	8.5%
236	June 6	8.2%	8.0%
237	June 13	8.4%	7.7%
238	June 20	9.4%	8.5%
239	June 27	8.8%	9.5%
240	July 4	10.3%	10.0%
241	July 11	10.3%	9.7%
242	July 18	9.2%	8.8%
243	July 25	11.6%	9.8%
244	August 1	7.6%	7.8%
245	August 15	7.9%	7.8%
246	August 22	10.3%	9.1%
247	August 29	9.5%	9.8%
248	September 5	10.5%	8.4%
249	September 12	10.4%	8.7%
250	September 19	9.5%	9.2%
251	September 26	9.2%	8.6%
252	October 3	9.2%	8.1%
253	October 10	9.2%	9.5%
254	October 17	7.7%	8.3%
255	October 24	8.1%	7.6%
256	October 31	9.3%	10.1%
257	November 7	8.7%	9.0%
258	November	8.6%	8.7%
259	November 28	9.8%	8.2%
260	December 12	9.3%	9.7%
261	December 26	10.8%	10.5%

List of ratings in 2013 (episode 262–312)
Ep. #	Original Airdate	TNmS Ratings	Nielsen Ratings
Ep. #	Original Airdate	Nationwide	
262	January 2	10.6%	10.1%
263	January 9	8.9%	8.3%
264	January 16	9.3%	8.2%
265	January 23	9.3%	10.8%
266	January 30	8.1%	8.5%
267	February 6	7.9%	7.9%
268	February 13	7.9%	7.2%
269	February 20	10.8%	11.2%
270	February 27	9.2%	9.1%
271	March 6	7.5%	6.6%
272	March 13	6.7%	7.2%
273	March 20	5.6%	6.0%
274	March 27	5.9%	7.0%
275	April 3	6.7%	6.7%
276	April 10	6.0%	6.9%
277	April 17	7.0%	7.7%
278	April 24	6.4%	8.4%
279	May 1	6.4%	7.0%
280	May 8	2.3%	2.6%
281	May 15	5.1%	6.9%
282	May 22	6.1%	7.5%
283	May 29	7.4%	8.8%
284	June 5	7.3%	7.6%
285	June 12	7.3%	8.9%
286	June 19	7.3%	8.0%
287	June 26	7.1%	9.6%
288	July 3	8.2%	9.3%
289	July 10	7.6%	8.2%
290	July 17	7.6%	9.3%
291	July 24	8.0%	10.2%
292	July 31	7.7%	9.1%
293	August 7	7.5%	7.5%
294	August 21	6.5%	7.8%
295	August 28	6.1%	6.8%
296	September 4	7.1%	8.3%
297	September 11	6.6%	7.5%
298	September 18	6.9%	7.8%
299	September 25	7.5%	7.2%
300	October 2	8.1%	8.8%
301	October 9	7.4%	7.5%
302	October 16	6.4%	7.2%
303	October 23	7.4%	7.6%
304	October 30	6.5%	7.0%
305	November 6	6.3%	7.4%
306	November 13	6.7%	7.9%
307	November 20	5.9%	6.7%
308	November 27	6.2%	6.4%
309	December 4	6.8%	5.8%
310	December 11	5.6%	5.8%
311	December 18	6.2%	6.0%
312	December 25	6.5%	7.6%

List of ratings in 2014 (episode 313–359)
Ep. #	Original Airdate	TNmS Ratings	Nielsen Ratings
Ep. #	Original Airdate	Nationwide	
313	January 1	7.0%	7.7%
314	January 8	7.1%	8.1%
315	January 15	7.9%	7.8%
316	January 22	7.4%	8.5%
317	January 29	6.9%	7.2%
318	February 5	6.9%	6.5%
319	February 26	6.4%	7.6%
320	March 5	5.6%	7.1%
321	March 12	6.5%	7.2%
322	March 19	6.1%	6.6%
323	March 26	6.1%	6.3%
324	April 2	5.2%	5.4%
325	April 9	4.7%	4.9%
326	April 30	6.5%	7.2%
327	May 7	6.5%	7.4%
328	May 14	6.7%	6.8%
329	May 21	5.8%	6.2%
330	May 28	6.6%	5.4%
331	June 11	7.2%	7.5%
332	June 18	6.5%	7.3%
333	June 25	7.2%	6.7%
334	July 2	5.2%	5.6%
335	July 9	5.1%	5.3%
336	July 16	5.1%	6.1%
337	July 23	5.1%	5.8%
338	July 30	5.1%	5.9%
339	August 6	6.2%	7.1%
340	August 13	6.7%	6.8%
341	August 20	5.5%	6.5%
342	August 27	5.8%	6.3%
343	September 3	6.2%	6.6%
344	September 10	6.8%	6.9%
345	September 17	5.2%	5.5%
346	September 24	6.5%	7.2%
347	October 1	5.8%	6.5%
348	October 8	4.5%	5.5%
349	October 15	4.3%	5.2%
350	October 22	4.6%	5.3%
351	October 29	5.0%	5.0%
352	November 5	5.3%	6.0%
353	November 12	5.6%	5.8%
354	November 19	5.4%	5.5%
355	November 26	5.8%	5.5%
356	December 3	5.6%	6.5%
357	December 10	6.2%	6.5%
358	December 17	5.4%	5.6%
359	December 24	7.2%	7.4%

List of ratings in 2015 (episode 360–410)
Ep. #	Original Airdate	TNmS Ratings	Nielsen Ratings
Ep. #	Original Airdate	Nationwide	
360	January 7	5.8%	5.7%
361	January 14	4.0%	4.8%
362	January 21	5.7%	6.9%
363	January 28	7.8%	7.2%
364	February 4	5.3%	6.5%
365	February 11	6.3%	6.0%
366	February 18	7.0%	5.6%
367	February 25	6.4%	7.1%
368	March 4	6.6%	6.4%
369	March 11	5.8%	4.8%
370	March 18	5.8%	6.6%
371	March 25	6.0%	5.2%
372	April 1	4.9%	4.7%
373	April 8	6.1%	5.6%
374	April 15	5.6%	7.1%
375	April 22	5.7%	5.6%
376	April 29	4.4%	5.0%
377	May 6	5.8%	5.4%
378	May 13	5.6%	6.3%
379	May 20	5.6%	5.5%
380	May 27	6.2%	6.4%
381	June 3	5.5%	5.8%
382	June 10	5.3%	6.3%
383	June 17	5.5%	5.8%
384	June 24	5.6%	5.9%
385	July 1	5.9%	6.3%
386	July 8	5.7%	6.9%
387	July 15	5.7%	6.2%
388	July 22	5.7%	7.0%
389	July 29	5.5%	7.1%
390	August 5	5.4%	5.9%
391	August 12	5.4%	5.9%
392	August 19	5.2%	5.8%
393	August 26	4.7%	6.7%
394	September 2	4.9%	6.2%
395	September 9	5.6%	6.5%
396	September 16	5.2%	6.3%
397	September 23	6.4%	7.8%
398	September 30	4.8%	6.9%
399	October 7	5.1%	6.2%
400	October 14	6.2%	7.0%
401	October 21	6.5%	8.5%
402	October 28	5.5%	7.5%
403	November 4	6.8%	8.0%
404	November 11	6.6%	7.9%
405	November 18	5.5%	7.4%
406	November 25	5.6%	7.2%
407	December 2	4.9%	6.8%
408	December 9	5.0%	7.3%
409	December 16	5.6%	8.0%
410	December 23	6.0%	8.5%

List of ratings in 2016 (episode 411–458)
Ep. #	Original Airdate	TNmS Ratings	Nielsen Ratings
Ep. #	Original Airdate	Nationwide	
411	January 6	5.9%	7.9%
412	January 13	7.0%	9.3%
413	January 20	6.9%	8.3%
414	January 27	6.5%	8.9%
415	February 3	7.8%	10.0%
416	February 10	7.2%	9.5%
417	February 17	6.9%	8.9%
418	February 24	6.6%	7.7%
419	March 2	6.1%	8.6%
420	March 9	5.9%	7.8%
421	March 16	5.7%	8.2%
422	March 23	6.4%	7.0%
423	March 30	6.7%	9.2%
424	April 6	5.4%	7.6%
425	April 20	5.9%	7.3%
426	April 27	6.1%	7.4%
427	May 4	6.3%	6.8%
428	May 11	6.8%	8.4%
429	May 18	6.3%	7.8%
430	May 25	6.4%	9.1%
431	June 1	6.7%	8.3%
432	June 8	5.1%	6.8%
433	June 15	5.9%	7.3%
434	June 22	7.9%	9.0%
435	June 29	6.0%	7.8%
436	July 6	5.3%	6.9%
437	July 13	6.9%	6.7%
438	July 20	6.0%	6.7%
439	July 27	6.9%	7.5%
440	August 3	9.0%	9.0%
441	August 24	9.1%	9.2%
442	August 31	9.0%	8.6%
443	September 7	9.0%	9.3%
444	September 14	7.9%	7.5%
445	September 21	7.3%	9.0%
446	September 28	8.5%	9.8%
447	October 5	8.1%	8.7%
448	October 19	9.9%	10.4%
449	October 26	8.7%	9.8%
450	November 2	6.9%	7.4%
451	November 9	6.9%	9.1%
452	November 16	7.5%	6.7%
453	November 23	8.7%	9.0%
454	November 30	7.8%	7.5%
455	December 7	7.2%	8.1%
456	December 14	7.3%	8.6%
457	December 21	8.6%	7.7%
458	December 28	7.6%	9.7%

List of ratings in 2017 (episode 459–500)
Ep. #	Original Airdate	TNmS Ratings	Nielsen Ratings
Ep. #	Original Airdate	Nationwide	
459	January 4	8.3%	9.4%
460	January 11	5.5%	7.5%
461	January 18	6.8%	9.1%
462	January 25	6.3%	7.7%
463	February 1	7.0%	8.4%
464	February 8	7.7%	8.3%
465	February 15	6.4%	7.5%
466	February 22	7.6%	8.2%
467	March 1	6.6%	7.8%
468	March 8	6.4%	7.4%
469	March 15	7.5%	7.2%
470	March 22	6.3%	6.8%
471	March 29	6.6%	7.9%
472	April 5	7.3%	8.6%
473	April 12	6.7%	6.3%
473	April 12	6.6%	6.7%
474	April 19	5.0%	4.3%
474	April 19	6.1%	5.9%
475	April 26	6.5%	6.8%
475	April 26	5.7%	6.6%
476	May 3	5.5%	6.3%
476	May 3	6.1%	6.9%
477	May 10	6.2%	7.0%
477	May 10	6.2%	6.6%
478	May 17	6.7%	7.9%
478	May 17	6.6%	7.0%
479	May 24	6.9%	7.9%
479	May 24	6.8%	7.6%
480	May 31	7.2%	7.8%
480	May 31	6.0%	6.8%
481	June 7	7.3%	7.7%
481	June 7	7.3%	7.5%
482	June 14	7.4%	6.9%
482	June 14	6.6%	6.4%
483	June 21	6.6%	6.9%
483	June 21	5.2%	6.2%
484	June 28	6.0%	5.9%
484	June 28	5.7%	5.7%
486	July 12	8.1%	6.6%
486	July 12	6.8%	5.9%
487	July 19	7.4%	8.5%
487	July 19	6.9%	7.8%
488	July 26	7.3%	7.5%
488	July 26	6.5%	7.4%
489	August 2	5.9%	6.0%
489	August 2	6.5%	6.1%
490	August 9	6.2%	6.7%
490	August 9	5.7%	6.4%
491	August 16	6.0%	5.9%
491	August 16	5.7%	5.6%
492	August 23	6.7%	7.1%
492	August 23	6.3%	7.0%
493	August 30	6.4%	6.5%
493	August 30	5.1%	5.7%
494	November 15	5.3%	5.1%
494	November 15	4.9%	4.8%
495	November 22	5.7%	6.4%
495	November 22	5.5%	5.7%
496	November 29	5.5%	5.8%
496	November 29	5.5%	5.7%
497	December 6	4.6%	4.5%
497	December 6	4.1%	3.3%
498	December 13	6.1%	5.3%
498	December 13	6.1%	4.8%
499	December 20	5.3%	5.3%
499	December 20	5.8%	5.2%
500	December 27	6.2%	6.1%
500	December 27	6.1%	6.6%

List of ratings in 2018 (episode 501–548)
Ep. #	Original Airdate	TNmS Ratings	Nielsen Ratings
Ep. #	Original Airdate	Nationwide	
501	January 3	6.6%	6.5%
501	January 3	6.7%	7.0%
502	January 10	6.2%	6.0%
502	January 10	5.9%	5.2%
503	January 17	6.7%	5.6%
503	January 17	6.5%	5.0%
504	January 24	5.5%	5.2%
504	January 24	5.3%	4.8%
505	January 31	6.4%	6.1%
505	January 31	7.0%	5.7%
506	February 7	6.5%	6.3%
506	February 7	5.8%	6.0%
507	February 21	6.8%	6.3%
507	February 21	5.7%	5.3%
508	February 28	6.6%	7.4%
508	February 28	6.7%	6.6%
509	March 7	5.5%	5.5%
509	March 7	5.1%	5.0%
510	March 14	6.8%	5.7%
510	March 14	7.2%	6.2%
511	March 21	6.0%	5.9%
511	March 21	5.9%	5.4%
512	March 28	6.2%	4.9%
512	March 28	6.3%	5.2%
513	April 4	5.4%	5.6%
513	April 4	5.7%	5.7%
514	April 11	5.7%	5.2%
514	April 11	5.3%	5.3%
515	April 18	4.0%	4.1%
515	April 18	4.3%	4.9%
516	May 2	5.0%	4.9%
516	May 2	5.2%	5.3%
517	May 9	5.0%	5.0%
517	May 9	5.7%	5.7%
518	May 16	5.3%	6.2%
518	May 16	5.7%	5.6%
519	May 23	6.9%	6.0%
519	May 23	6.6%	5.9%
520	May 30	5.7%	4.5%
520	May 30	5.5%	5.0%
521	June 6	6.1%	5.0%
521	June 6	4.7%	4.5%
522	June 20	7.5%	6.8%
522	June 20	7.0%	6.0%
523	July 4	7.4%	6.6%
523	July 4	7.4%	7.6%
524	July 11	7.9%	8.5%
524	July 11	8.6%	9.1%
525	July 18	6.0%	5.4%
525	July 18	4.9%	4.8%
526	July 25	6.9%	7.3%
526	July 25	7.6%	8.7%
527	August 1	6.0%	6.3%
527	August 1	6.1%	6.1%
528	August 8	5.7%	6.0%
528	August 8	5.7%	5.9%
529	August 15	8.0%	8.1%
529	August 15	7.1%	7.7%
530	August 22	5.8%	5.9%
530	August 22	5.7%	5.9%
531	August 29	6.0%	6.2%
531	August 29	6.1%	6.2%
532	September 5	N/R	5.6%
532	September 5	N/R	5.6%
533	September 12	N/R	5.9%
533	September 12	N/R	6.4%
534	September 19	N/R	6.3%
534	September 19	N/R	7.1%
535	September 26	N/R	5.0%
535	September 26	N/R	5.2%
536	October 3	N/R	4.8%
536	October 3	N/R	4.9%
537	October 10	N/R	5.0%
537	October 10	N/R	5.2%
538	October 17	N/R	6.0%
538	October 17	N/R	5.7%
539	October 24	N/R	5.0%
539	October 24	N/R	4.4%
540	October 31	N/R	4.9%
540	October 31	N/R	5.0%
541	November 7	N/R	5.2%
541	November 7	N/R	4.6%
542	November 14	N/R	4.5%
542	November 14	N/R	5.2%
543	November 21	N/R	4.4%
543	November 21	N/R	4.9%
544	November 28	N/R	4.7%
544	November 28	N/R	4.9%
545	December 5	N/R	4.4%
545	December 5	N/R	4.4%
546	December 12	N/R	5.1%
546	December 12	N/R	5.3%
547	December 19	N/R	4.5%
547	December 19	N/R	4.6%
548	December 26	N/R	5.3%
548	December 26	N/R	5.2%

List of ratings in 2019 (episode 549–600)
Ep. #	Original Airdate	Nielsen Ratings	
Ep. #	Original Airdate	Nationwide	
Ep. #	Original Airdate	Part 1	Part 2
549	January 2	5.1%	6.1%
550	January 9	4.4%	3.6%
551	January 16	4.2%	4.0%
552	January 23	4.6%	4.2%
553	January 30	5.1%	5.1%
554	February 6	6.0%	6.0%
555	February 13	4.2%	4.4%
556	February 20	4.9%	4.9%
557	February 27	3.8%	3.7%
558	March 6	4.1%	3.9%
559	March 13	3.7%	4.9%
560	March 20	4.3%	4.8%
561	March 27	4.3%	4.2%
562	April 3	4.6%	4.9%
563	April 10	4.6%	4.8%
564	April 17	5.3%	4.9%
565	April 24	4.8%	5.0%
566	May 1	4.8%	4.7%
567	May 8	4.3%	4.0%
568	May 15	4.5%	4.4%
569	May 22	5.2%	4.9%
570	May 29	5.8%	4.6%
571	June 5	4.5%	4.5%
572	June 12	5.1%	5.2%
573	June 19	4.4%	4.1%
574	June 26	5.0%	5.2%
575	July 3	5.0%	4.5%
576	July 10	5.2%	5.2%
577	July 17	4.9%	4.9%
578	July 24	4.9%	4.6%
579	July 31	4.2%	4.1%
580	August 7	4.3%	4.1%
581	August 14	4.6%	4.2%
582	August 21	4.0%	3.8%
583	August 28	4.7%	5.0%
584	September 4	4.0%	4.1%
585	September 11	6.1%	5.4%
586	September 18	3.8%	3.8%
587	September 25	4.2%	3.8%
588	October 2	3.7%	4.1%
589	October 9	4.0%	4.4%
590	October 16	3.7%	3.8%
591	October 23	4.6%	4.3%
592	October 30	3.7%	2.9%
593	November 6	6.2%	5.7%
594	November 13	5.5%	4.5%
595	November 20	6.3%	5.7%
596	November 27	5.2%	5.1%
597	December 4	3.4%	2.8%
598	December 11	4.4%	3.2%
599	December 18	4.1%	3.9%
600	December 25	4.5%	3.5%

=== 2020s ===
List of ratings in 2020 (episode 601–652)
Ep. #	Original Airdate	Nielsen Ratings	
Ep. #	Original Airdate	Nationwide	
Ep. #	Original Airdate	Part 1	Part 2
601	January 1	5.3%	
602	January 8	4.9%	5.3%
603	January 15	5.7%	5.2%
604	January 22	4.5%	4.1%
605	January 29	5.1%	4.4%
606	February 5	5.2%	4.8%
607	February 12	4.8%	3.9%
608	February 19	4.3%	3.9%
609	February 26	3.8%	
610	March 4	6.6%	6.5%
611	March 11	4.5%	4.4%
612	March 18	4.2%	4.1%
613	March 25	4.3%	
614	April 1	9.3%	10.6%
615	April 8	10.0%	9.6%
Special	April 15	4.7%	3.4%
616	April 22	4.8%	4.0%
617	April 29	5.0%	
618	May 6	4.9%	4.8%
619	May 13	4.4%	3.9%
620	May 20	4.0%	4.5%
621	May 27	3.0%	
622	June 3	4.0%	4.1%
623	June 10	3.1%	
624	June 17	3.4%	
625	June 24	3.6%	
626	July 1	3.9%	
627	July 8	3.7%	
628	July 15	3.5%	
629	July 22	4%	
630	July 29	4.5%	
631	August 5	4.4%	
632	August 12	4.5%	
633	August 19	3.4%	4.3%
634	August 26	2.7%	2.8%
635	September 2	4.2%	4.6%
636	September 9	2.7%	3.5%
637	September 16	3.4%	3.7%
638	September 23	2.7%	3.6%
639	September 30	4.9%	
640	October 7	3.9%	5.2%
641	October 14	2.2%	3.1%
642	October 21	2.8%	4.7%
643	October 28	2.0%	2.7%
644	November 4	2.2%	
645	November 11	2.4%	3.0%
646	November 18	3.1%	4.1%
647	November 25	3.2%	3.4%
648	December 2	2.6%	3.7%
649	December 9	2.4%	3.2%
650	December 16	3.3%	4.0%
651	December 23	4.0%	3.9%

List of ratings in 2021 (episode 653–751)
Ep. #	Original Airdate	Nielsen Ratings	
Ep. #	Original Airdate	Nationwide	
Ep. #	Original Airdate	Part 1	Part 2
652	January 6	4.7%	5.0%
653	January 13	5.4%	4.3%
654	January 20	5.4%	5.1%
655	January 27	5.5%	4.9%
656	February 3	4.6%	
657	February 10	4.6%	5.1%
658	February 17	4.5%	4.1%
659	February 24	5.1%	4.7%
700	March 3	5.0%	4.3%
701	March 10	4.8%	4.4%
702	March 17	5.4%	4.5%
703	March 24	3.7%	3.4%
704	March 31	3.9%	4.6%
705	April 7	7.7%	6.8%
706	April 14	4.3%	%
707	April 21	3.4%	%
708	April 28	3.6%	%
709	May 5	4.4%	%
710	May 12	3.8%	%
711	May 19	3.7%	%
712	May 26	5.2%	4.7%
713	June 2	3.3%	%
714	June 9	5.1%	4.6%
715	June 16	3.9%	%
716	June 23	5.0%	%
717	June 30	4.6%	%
718	July 7	4.2%	—N/a
719	July 14	5.2%	—N/a
720	July 21	6.9%	—N/a
721	July 28	6.0%	—N/a
722	August 11	5.1%	—N/a
723	August 18	6.4%	—N/a
724	August 25	5.2%	—N/a
725	September 1	4.8%	—N/a
726	September 8	4.4%	—N/a
727	September 15	4.6%	—N/a
728	September 22	5.4%	—N/a
729	September 29	6.3%	—N/a
730	October 6	5.9%	—N/a
731	October 13	5.9%	—N/a
732	October 20	5.2%	—N/a
733	October 27	4.5%	
734	November 3	5.3%	
735	November 10	4.8%	
736	November 17	5.2%	
737	November 24	6.6%	
738	December 1	5.8%	
739	December 8	5.5%	
740	December 15	5.5%	
741	December 22	6.6%	

List of ratings in 2022 (episode 752–797)
Ep. #	Original Airdate	Nielsen Ratings
Ep. #	Original Airdate	Nationwide
752	January 5	6.3%
753	January 12	6.0%
754	January 19	5.7%
755	January 26	8.3%
756	February 2	6.8%
757	February 9	4.2%
758	February 23	4.7%
759	March 2	5.5%
760	March 16	4.4%
761	March 23	3.9%
762	March 30	4.9%
763	April 6	4.9%
764	April 13	4.9%
765	April 20	5.4%
766	April 27	4.6%
767	May 4	5.9%
768	May 11	4.5%

== Awards and nominations ==
Year	Award	Category	Recipients	Result	Ref.
2011	11th MBC Entertainment Awards	Best Newcomer Award	Kim Hee-chul	Won	
2016	16th MBC Entertainment Awards	Grand Prize (Daesang)	Kim Gu-ra	Nominated	
2016	16th MBC Entertainment Awards	Program of the Year	Radio Star	Nominated	
2016	16th MBC Entertainment Awards	Top Excellence Award in Music/Talk Show	Kim Gu-ra	Nominated	
2016	16th MBC Entertainment Awards	Excellence Award in Music/Talk Show (Male)	Cho Kyu-hyun	Nominated	
2016	16th MBC Entertainment Awards	Excellence Award in Music/Talk Show (Male)	Kim Gook-jin	Nominated	
2016	16th MBC Entertainment Awards	Excellence Award in Music/Talk Show (Female)	Solbi	Won	
2016	16th MBC Entertainment Awards	Rookie Award in Music/Talk Show (Male)	Parc Jae-jung	Nominated	
2016	16th MBC Entertainment Awards	Rookie Award in Music/Talk Show (Female)	Lee Sun-bin	Nominated	
2016	16th MBC Entertainment Awards	PD's Award	Kim Gu-ra	Won	
2016	16th MBC Entertainment Awards	Special Award (Music/Talk Show)	Yoon Jong-shin	Won	
2017	17th MBC Entertainment Awards	Grand Prize (Daesang)	Kim Gu-ra	Nominated	
2017	17th MBC Entertainment Awards	Program of the Year	Radio Star	Nominated	
2017	17th MBC Entertainment Awards	Top Excellence Award, Show/Sitcom Category	Kim Gook-jin	Won	
2017	17th MBC Entertainment Awards	Top Excellence Award, Show/Sitcom Category	Kim Gu-ra	Nominated	
2017	17th MBC Entertainment Awards	Top Excellence Award, Show/Sitcom Category	Yoon Jong-shin	Nominated	
2017	17th MBC Entertainment Awards	Achievement Award	Kim Gook-jin; Yoon Jong-shin; Kim Gu-ra; Cho Kyu-hyun	Won	
2018	18th MBC Entertainment Awards	Grand Prize (Daesang)	Kim Gu-ra	Nominated	
2018	18th MBC Entertainment Awards	Program of the Year	Radio Star	Nominated	
2018	18th MBC Entertainment Awards	Top Excellence Award, Music/Talk Category	Yoon Jong-shin	Won	
2018	18th MBC Entertainment Awards	Top Excellence Award, Music/Talk Category	Kim Gook-jin	Nominated	
2018	18th MBC Entertainment Awards	Excellence Award, Music/Talk Category (Male)	Cha Tae-hyun	Won	
2018	18th MBC Entertainment Awards	Entertainer of the Year Award	Kim Gu-ra	Won	
2019	19th MBC Entertainment Awards	Program of the Year	Radio Star	Nominated	
2019	19th MBC Entertainment Awards	Top Excellence Award in Music/Talk Category (Male)	Kim Gook-jin	Nominated	
2019	19th MBC Entertainment Awards	Excellence Award in Music/Talk Category (Female)	Ahn Young-mi	Won	
2019	19th MBC Entertainment Awards	Best Couple Award	Kim Gu-ra and Ahn Young-mi	Nominated	
2020	20th MBC Entertainment Awards	Program of the Year	Radio Star	Nominated	
2020	20th MBC Entertainment Awards	Best Couple Award	Kim Gu-ra and Ahn Young-mi	Nominated	
2020	20th MBC Entertainment Awards	Popularity Award	Ahn Young-mi	Won	
2021	21st MBC Entertainment Awards	Program of the Year	Radio Star	Nominated	
2021	21st MBC Entertainment Awards	Top Excellence Award	Ahn Young-mi	Nominated	
2021	21st MBC Entertainment Awards	Excellence Award	Yoo Se-yoon	Won	
2021	21st MBC Entertainment Awards	Scriptwriter of the Year	Park Hyeon-jung	Won	
