= 2017 Mnet Asian Music Awards =

Music awards ceremony in Vietnam

- Promotion poster and logo
- Date: November 25, 2017; November 29, 2017; December 1, 2017
- Venue: Hòa Bình Theater, Ho Chi Minh City, Vietnam; Yokohama Arena, Yokohama, Japan; W Hong Kong and AsiaWorld-Expo, Hong Kong
- Presented by: Qoo10
- Hosted by: Thu Minh (Vietnam); Park Bo-gum (Japan); Song Joong-ki (Hong Kong)
- Most awards: BTS and Wanna One (3)
- Website: 2017mama.com

Television/radio coverage
- Network: Mnet, across CJ E&M channels and other international networks
- Runtime: Vietnam: 60 minutes (Red Carpet), 120 minutes (Main event); Japan: 90 minutes (Red Carpet), 180 minutes (Main event); Hong Kong: 90 minutes (Red Carpet), 240 minutes (Main event)

The 2017 Mnet Asian Music Awards ceremony, organized by CJ E&M through its music channel Mnet, took place from November 25 through December 1, 2017 (dubbed as "MAMA Week") in Vietnam, Japan and Hong Kong with the theme, "Coexistence". It was the eighth consecutive Mnet Asian Music Awards to be hosted outside of South Korea, the 19th ceremony in the show's history, and the first ceremony to take place in three locations.

Nominees were announced on October 19, 2017, through the 2017 MAMA Nomination Special Live Broadcast aired on Mnet streamed nationally and globally. According to media outlets, the 2017 MAMA's had 42 million tweets, surpassing the number of the previous year.

== Shows ==
Event	Date	City	Country	Host	Venue	Ref.
MAMA Premiere in Vietnam	November 25, 2017	Ho Chi Minh City	Vietnam	Thu Minh	Hòa Bình Theater	
MAMA in Japan	November 29, 2017	Yokohama	Japan	Park Bo-gum	Yokohama Arena	
MAMA Professional Categories	November 30, 2017	Hong Kong		Kim Young-chul, Shin A-young & Ji Sook	W Hong Kong	
MAMA in Hong Kong	December 1, 2017	Hong Kong		Song Joong-ki	AsiaWorld–Expo	

== Criteria ==
Division	Online Voting	MAMA Professional Panel (Local + Foreign)	Music Sales	Record Sales
Artist of the Year Award Category by Artist*	30%	30%	30%	10%
Song of the Year Award Category by Genre**	20%	40%	30%	10%
Album of the Year	–	40%	–	60%
Special Prize***	30%	70%	–	–
*Best New (M)ale/(F)emale Artist, Best M/F Artist, Best M/F Group; **Best Dance Performance (Solo/M/F Group), Best Vocal Performance (M/F/Group), Best HipHop & Urban Music, Best Band Performance, Best Collaboration, Best OST; ***Best Music Video

== Winners and nominees ==
Winners are listed first and highlighted in boldface. Following the announcement of the nominees on October 19, online voting opened on the official MAMA website and Mwave app and Qoo10 website and app on October 21. Voting ended on November 28, 2017.

=== Main Award ===
Qoo10 Artist of the Year (Daesang)	Qoo10 Album of the Year (Daesang)
**BTS**; Twice; Exo; Wanna One; IU	**Exo – The War**; BTS – Love Yourself: Her; Wanna One – 1×1=1 (To Be One); Twice – Signal; Seventeen – Al1
Qoo10 Song of the Year (Daesang)	Best Music Video
**Twice – "Signal"**; Exo – "Ko Ko Bop"; Heize – "You, Clouds And Rain"; IU – "Through The Night"; Red Velvet – "Red Flavor"	**BTS – "Spring Day"**; Exo – "Power"; Twice – "Signal"; Wanna One – "Energetic"; Seventeen – "Don't Wanna Cry"
Best Male Artist	Best Female Artist
**Zico**; Yoon Jong-shin; G-Dragon; Zion.T; Psy	**IU**; Sunmi; Taeyeon; Heize; Suzy
Best Male Group	Best Female Group
**Wanna One**; Exo; BTS; Seventeen; Got7; NU'EST W	**Red Velvet**; Twice; Mamamoo; GFriend; Blackpink
Best Dance Performance – Male Group	Best Dance Performance – Female Group
**Seventeen – "Don't Wanna Cry"**; NCT 127 – "Cherry Bomb"; Exo – "Ko Ko Bop"; Monsta X – "Beautiful; BTS – "DNA"; VIXX – "Shangri-La"	**Twice – "Signal"**; Girls' Generation – "Holiday"; GFriend – "Love Whisper"; Apink – "Five"; Red Velvet – "Red Flavor"
Best Dance Performance – Solo	Best Collaboration
**Taemin – "Move"**; Hyuna – "Babe"; Sunmi – "Gashina"; Psy – "New Face"; Lee Hyori – "Black"	**Dynamic Duo & Chen – "Nosedive"**; Soyou & Baekhyun – "Rain"; IU & Ohhyuk – "Can't Love You Anymore"; Hyolyn & Changmo – "Blue Moon"; Jay Park & Dok2 – "Most Hated"
Best Vocal Performance – Female	Best Vocal Performance – Male
**Heize – "You, Clouds, Rain"**; Kim Se-jeong – "Flower Way"; Suran – "Wine"; IU – "Through The Night"; Jung Eun-ji – "The Spring"	**Yoon Jong-shin – "Like It?"**; Zion.T – "The Song"; Jung Seung-hwan – "This Fool"; Han Dong-geun – "Crazy"; Hwang Chi-yeul – "A Daily Song"
Best Vocal Performance – Group	Best OST
**Bolbbalgan4 – "Tell Me You Love Me"**; BtoB – "Missing You"; Highlight – "Calling You"; Winner – "Really Really"; Mamamoo – "Yes I am"	**Ailee – "I Will Go to You Like the First Snow" (Guardian: The Lonely and Great God)**; Chanyeol & Punch – "Stay With Me" (Guardian: The Lonely and Great God); Bolbbalgan4 – "You and Me from the Start" (The Emperor: Owner of the Mask); Suzy – "I Love You Boy" (While You Were Sleeping); Crush – "Beautiful" (Guardian: The Lonely and Great God)
Best Band Performance	Best HipHop & Urban Music
**Hyukoh – "TOMBOY"**; Day6 – "I Smile"; Buzz – "The Love"; CNBLUE – "Between Us"; F.T. Island – "Wind"	**Heize – "Don't Know You"**; Zico – "Artist"; Dean – "Come Over"; Mad Clown – "Lost Without You"; Woo Won-jae – "We Are"
Best New Artist – Male	Best New Artist – Female
**Wanna One**; Samuel; The East Light; Golden Child; Jeong Se-woon	**PRISTIN**; Weki Meki; Kim Chung-ha; Dreamcatcher; Momoland

=== Favorite Award ===
Mwave Global Fans' Choice	2017 Favorite KPOP Star
**Exo – "Ko Ko Bop"**; Winner – "Really Really"; T-ara – "What's My Name?"; Wanna One – "Energetic"; BTS – "DNA"	**Got7**; BTS; Winner; Zico; Psy; Exo; CNBLUE; Seventeen; Twice; Red Velvet; Highlight; F.T. Island; NCT 127; Monsta X; IU; NU'EST W; Blackpink; Wanna One; BtoB; Day6

=== Special Awards ===
Nominees		Winners
Favorite Vietnamese Artist presented by Clear & Close-Up		Sơn Tùng M-TP
Best Asian Artist	Japan	AKB48
Best Asian Artist	Indonesia	Agnez Mo
Best Asian Artist	Mandarin	Karen Mok
Best Asian Artist	Vietnam	Tóc Tiên
Best Asian Artist	Singapore	Aisyah Aziz
Best Asian Artist	Thailand	Lula
Best Asian Style	in Japan	EXO-CBX
Best Asian Style	in Hong Kong	BTS
New Asian Artist		NCT 127
Best of Next		Wanna One
Best of Next		Chungha
Style In Music		Sunmi
Discovery of the Year		NU'EST W
Best Concert Performer		Monsta X
World Performer		Got7
Worldwide Favorite Artist		Seventeen
Best Composer of the Year		Raisa Andriana & Isyana Sarasvati
Best Executive of the Year		George Trivino
Best Engineer of the Year		Dat Nguyen Minh
Best Video Director of the Year		Atsushi Makino
Best Choreographer of the Year		Youngjun Choi
Best Visual & Art Director of the Year		Yang
Best Producer of the Year		Pdogg
Inspired Achievement		Yasushi Akimoto

=== Multiple wins ===
The following artist(s) received three or more wins:

Awards	Artist(s)
3	BTS
3	Wanna One

=== Multiple nominations ===
All artists nominated is also present in the "daesang" categories. The following artist(s) received five or more nominations (excluding the special awards):

Nominations	Artist(s)
6	Exo
6	Twice
6	IU
5	BTS
5	Red Velvet
5	Wanna One

== Performers ==
The following individuals and groups, listed in order of appearance, performed musical numbers.

=== 2017 MAMA Premiere in Vietnam ===
List of performances
Name(s)	Performance(s)	Notes
Tóc Tiên	"Em không là duy nhất" & "I'm in Love"/"Ngày mai"	"Guiding Star"
Lula	"Mun Keu Kwahm Ruk" & "Rheung Tee Khor"	"Lulaland"
Aisyah Aziz	"Tanda Tanya" & "Mimpi"	"World, Word"
Erik, Đức Phúc, & Hòa Minzy	Mashup Love Songs	"Better Together"
Samuel	"Sixteen" & "Candy"	"Realization of a Dream"
Agnez Mo	"Coke Bottle", "Long As I Get Paid" & "Damn, I Love You"	"Crush on You"
Wanna One	"Intro + Energetic" & "Burn It Up"	"Energetic Shock"
Seventeen	"I Don't Know, Well", "Don't Wanna Cry", "Without You" & "Clap"	"Show Never Ends"

=== 2017 MAMA in Japan ===
List of performances
Name(s)	Performance(s)	Notes
BoA	"Girls On Top" & "CAMO"	"Coexistence" (Opening Act)
Seventeen	"No. 1"	"Coexistence" (Opening Act)
Twice	"My Name"	"Coexistence" (Opening Act)
BoA (w/ Hwang Min-hyun)	"Only One"	"Coexistence" (Opening Act)
Monsta X	"Beautiful (2017 MAMA Mix Ver.)" & "Dramarama"	"Flesh And Bone"
Weki Meki	"Sugar High" & "I Don't Like Your Girlfriend"	"It's Showtime"
Kim Chung-ha	"Hand On Me" & "Why Don't You Know"	"It's Showtime"
PRISTIN	"We Are PRISTIN" & "Wee Woo"	"It's Showtime"
Weki Meki, Kim Chung-ha, Pristin, Idol School, Fromis 9 & AKB48	"Pick Me"	"It's Showtime"
Weki Meki, Kim Chung-ha, Pristin, Idol School, Fromis 9 & AKB48	"Heavy Rotation" & "Koisuru Fortune Cookie"	"It's Showtime"
Zico	"Anti" & "Artist"	"ZICO Prod. By ZICO"
Fromis 9	"Glass Shoes"	"Nine Promises"
Twice	"TT", "Signal" & "Likey (2017 MAMA Mix Ver.)"	"Dancing Like Twice"
Wanna One	"Intro + Energetic" & "Burn It Up: Prequel Mix"	"Revolution"
Seventeen	"Mansae" & "Clap"	"Time Between Dog and Wolf"
NU'EST W	"Where You At"	"Time Between Dog and Wolf"
Seventeen & NU'EST W	"Heaven"	"Time Between Dog and Wolf"
Exo-CBX	"Hey Mama!" & "Ka-CHING! (Remix Ver.)"	"Curious, Brilliant, XOXO"

=== 2017 MAMA in Hong Kong ===
List of performances
Name(s)	Performance(s)	Notes
Dynamic Duo & Chen	"Nosedive"	"Together" (Opening Act)
Dynamic Duo, Jackson Wang, Vernon, JooHeon, & Mark	"1/n (2017 MAMA Remix Ver.)"	"Together" (Opening Act)
Sunmi & Taemin	"Door", "Gashina" & "Move"	"Fatal Temptation"
Heize	"You, Clouds, Rain" & "Don't Know You"	"2 Rooms"
Bolbbalgan4	"Say You Love Me" & "Some"	"2 Rooms"
GOT7	"You Are"	"Perfect 7 Days"
GOT7 & DAY6	"Never Ever (Rock Version)"	"Perfect 7 Days"
Hitchhiker	"11"	"Red City"
NCT 127	"The 7th Sense - Reverse" & "Cherry Bomb"	"Red City"
Hitchhiker, Taeyong & Seulgi	"I Just & Around (Remix Ver.)"	"Red City"
Red Velvet	"Peek-A-Boo" & "Red Flavor (Hitchhiker Remix Ver.)"	"Red City"
Hitchhiker, NCT 127 & Red Velvet	"$10 (2017 MAMA Mix Ver.)"	"Red City"
Soyou	"I Miss You"	"Scene Of Love"
Chanyeol & Soyou	"Stay With Me"	"Scene Of Love"
Ailee	"I Will Go To You Like The First Snow"	"Scene Of Love"
Hyukoh	"Wanli万里"	"Eastern Wave"
EXO	"The Eve", "Ko Ko Bop" & "Power (Remix Ver.)"	"The Force Of The Planet"
Kai	"I See You", "Kinetic"	"The Force Of The Planet"
Wanna One	"Nothing Without You", "Beautiful", "Energetic" & "Pick Me"	"Vivid Dream"
Karen Mok	"Love Of My Life"	"The Empress Arrives"
Super Junior	"Black Suit"	"Super Junior Rises"
BTS	"Not Today", "DNA" & "Mic Drop (Steve Aoki Remix)"	"Beyond Wormhole"
RM, Suga & J-Hope	"Cypher 4"	"Beyond Wormhole"

== Presenters ==
2017 Mnet Asian Music Awards hosts

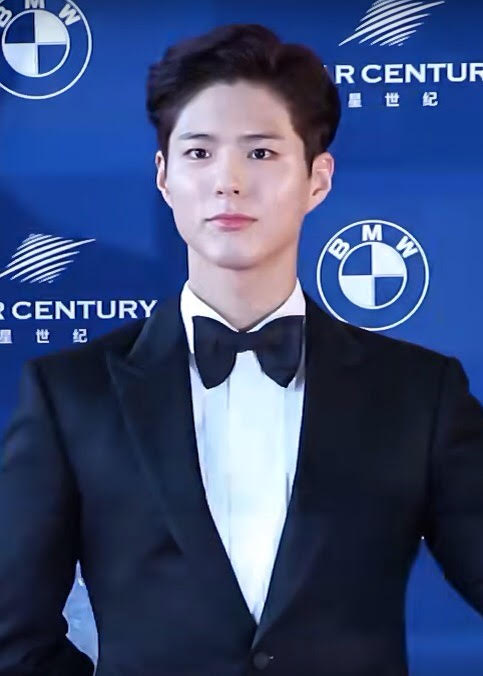
Park Bo-gum

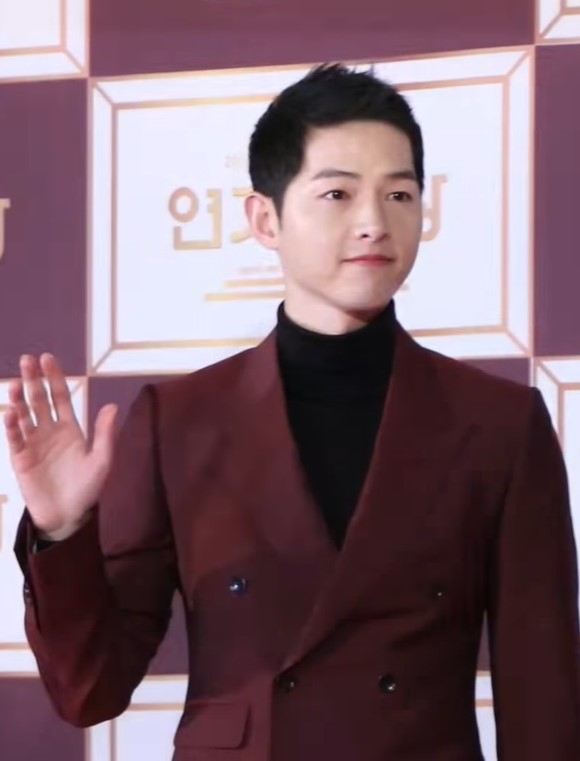
Song Joong-ki

Vietnam

- Dustin Phuc Nguyen & Hari Won – red carpet hosts
- Thu Minh – main host
- Duc Bao & Ai Phuong – supporting hosts
- Le Hieu & Pham Huong – presented Best Asian Artist (Indonesia)
- Khac Hung & Angela Phuong Trinh – presented Best Asian Artist (Thailand)
- Hua Vi Van & Diem My – presented Best of Next Award
- Trinh Thang Binh & Hari Won – presented Favorite Vietnamese Artist
- Kang Tae-oh & Chi Pu – presented Best Asian Artist (Singapore)
- Quang Dung & Thanh Hang – presented Best Asian Artist (Vietnam)
- Thu Minh – presented Worldwide Favorite Artist

Japan

- Jo Se-ho, Shin A-young & Ji Sook – red carpet hosts
- Park Bo-gum – main host
- I.O.I – presented Best New Female Artist
- Chu Sung-hoon, Lee Ho-jung & Chu Sa-rang – presented Best New Male Artist & Best Asian Style in Japan
- Seo Kang-joon – presented "It's Showtime" Performance & Inspired Achievement
- Fujii Mina – presented Best Of Next Award
- Jo Se-ho & Fromis 9 – presented Best Dance Performance Group – Female
- Sung Hoon & Lee Sun-bin – presented Best Concert Performer
- Yano Shiho – presented Discovery of the Year
- Harada Ryuuji & Ishida Nicole – presented Mwave Global Fans' Choice
- Lim Ju-hwan & Kim So-hyun – presented Best Male Artist
- Satoh Takeru – presented Best Dance Performance Group – Male
- BoA – presented Song of the Year

Hong Kong

- Kim Young-chul, Shin A-young & Ji Sook – red carpet hosts
- Song Joong-ki – main host
- Kim Min-seok & Kim Sae-ron – presented Best HipHop & Urban Music & Best Band Performance
- Kim Yoo-jung – presented Best Music Video
- Ji Soo & Nam Joo-hyuk – presented Best Collaboration & Style In Music
- Kwon Yul & Kim Jae-wook – presented Best Vocal Performance Solo & Best Dance Performance Solo
- Jo Se-ho & Ahn Jae-hyun – presented Best Vocal Performance Group & New Asian Artist
- Wong Cho-lam & Jo Bo-ah (with Jeong Se-woon) – presented Best Female Group & Best Asian Style In Hong Kong
- Lee Honey – presented UNESCO & CJ Group Global Education Campaign & "Vivid Dream" performance
- Lee Beom-soo & Lee Chung-ah – presented for Best OST & World Performer
- Park Joo-mi – presented Best Asian Artist Mandarin
- Lee Honey & Ahn Jae-hyun – presented Best Male Group
- Song Ji-hyo & Yoon Kye-sang – presented Artist of the Year
- Lee Young-ae – presented Album of the Year

== Controversies ==
=== Illegal online votes ===
Voting officially started on October 21, however the official website experienced issues for the following two days. On November 2, MAMA "nullified" illegal votes they detected between October 26 and November 1 and halted voting from 4:00 am to 8:00 am. In addition, they announced that they "will take stronger measures against illegal voting if it continues, including nullifying the votes confirmed to be illegitimate, blocking the relevant IP addresses, and permanently deleting the relevant accounts."

=== Blackpink incident ===
The photo of the South Korean group Blackpink was shown blurred in red for a moment during the announcement of the category candidates.

== Broadcast ==
2017 MAMA Premiere in Vietnam
Country	Network
South Korea	Mnet
Vietnam	tvBlue (Pre-recorded Broadcast)

2017 MAMA in Japan and Hong Kong
Country	Network	
South Korea	Mnet, OnStyle, O'live, XTM	
Japan	Mnet Smart, Mnet Japan, VideoPass	
United States	Mnet America, Kcon.tv	
Hong Kong	ViuTV, ViuTVsix	tvN Asia
Macau	ViuTV, ViuTVsix	tvN Asia
Taiwan	KKTV	tvN Asia
Indonesia	Indosiar, Vidio, JOOX	tvN Asia
Malaysia	JOOX	tvN Asia
Thailand	JOOX	tvN Asia
Philippines	Myx, KBO, iflix	tvN Asia
Cambodia	iflix	tvN Asia
Laos	iflix	tvN Asia
Myanmar	iflix	tvN Asia
Sri Lanka	iflix	tvN Asia
