= I Will Go to You Like the First Snow =

Single by Ailee
- Released: January 7, 2017
- Length: 3:50
- Label: YMC Entertainment; CJ E&M
- Songwriter: Mina (이미나)
- Producer: Rocoberry

Ailee singles chronology
"Home" (2016)	"I Will Go to You Like the First Snow" (2017)	"Reminiscing" (2017)

Audio video
- "I Will Go To You Like the First Snow" on YouTube

"I Will Go to You Like the First Snow" (Korean: 첫눈처럼 너에게 가겠다; RR: Cheonnuncheoreom neoege gagetda) is a song recorded by American singer-songwriter Ailee, serving as an original soundtrack (OST) for the 2016 hit television drama Guardian: The Lonely and Great God. The song was written by Mina (이미나) and composed by the musical duo Rocoberry. The single was released on January 7, 2017, and was part 9 in a series composed of high-charting singles.

"I Will Go to You Like the First Snow" was a critical and commercial success in South Korea. The song was the best-performing single of 2017, as it topped the yearly digital, download and streaming charts on the Gaon Music Chart. It has broken the record for most streamed song per year on Gaon, and has also exceeded the accumulated streaming number of one billion views on Melon. On December 14, "I Will Go to You Like the First Snow" made history as it became the song with the most number of streams on the Gaon Chart. As of November 2018, more than one year after its release, it has never once fallen out of the top 100 songs of the Gaon Digital Chart in South Korea, making it one of the longest-running songs of all time. It is also the best selling record in movies and dramas in the Korean sound record market.

The soundtrack has received several accolades, including the best original soundtrack award at the Seoul International Drama Awards, the Mnet Asian Music Awards, the Melon Music Awards, the Seoul Music Awards and the Golden Disc Awards. The success of "I Will Go to You Like the First Snow" has been compared to the 2012 hit song "Cherry Blossom Ending" by Busker Busker, which is known for re-entering music charts every spring. The song has been described as Cherry Blossom Ending's 'sadder, winter, immortal cousin', and is expected to re-enter music charts every winter. Due to the song's widespread enduring popularity, it is considered to be Ailee's signature song.

== Background and release ==
On January 4, it was announced that Ailee would be releasing a single for the South Korean cable television series Guardian: The Lonely and the Great God (also known as Goblin) official soundtrack. The single was composed and arranged by the South Korean indie band Rocoberry while the lyrics were written by Mina. Additionally, the best-selling author and tvN screenwriter Yi Mi-na contributed lyrics to the song. Rocoberry is a musical duo that consists of members Roco (vocalist, lyricist) and Conan (chorus, composer, lyricist). Rocoberry had previously worked on the OST's for the hit dramas Descendants of the Sun ("Everytime") and Pinocchio ("Love Is Like Snow"). They had also worked on two other singles for the Goblin OST which were also well received, Soyou's "I Miss You," and the theme song, "Stay With Me," sung by EXO's Chanyeol and Punch. This was the third time the duo worked with Ailee, as they had previously produced two of her soundtracks: "Are You The Same" for the drama Shine or Go Crazy, as well as "Because It's Love" for the drama Come Back Mister.

While being interviewed Conan revealed, "the production team asked for a song that conveys suffering and beauty concurrently. I repeatedly thought over how to express the strange feeling of beautiful sadness. During that period, it was to the point where 12 songs were rejected. After the song was finally chosen, it went through seven modifications." When asked about their inspirations for the lyrics and titles of their tracks for "Goblin," Conan imparted that it was all thanks to the drama's script. The story itself truly inspired them, wherein he even shared that the drama team itself is very supportive which constitutes to what a dream team is. He also commended Ailee's hard work by saying, "During the recording process, Ailee's health wasn't in the best condition. However, she persevered and sang for us until the end. I'm very thankful towards her." "I Will Go to You Like the First Snow" was officially released for digital download on January 7, 2017. Unlike some of the previous releases from the OST, its initial release was not paired with a music video.

In the Goblin TV drama, the most prominent uses of the song are at the end of Episode 13 (immediately after the Goblin promises to return to his bride) and the early part of Episode 14 (the Goblin returns from Limbo to Earth via an unexpected summon from his bride).

== Critical reception ==
An industry source analyzed the success of the song, and explained, "…it is a ballad that the general public won't tire of no matter how many times they listen to it…Ailee's emotional sensibility and lyrics that is suitable to any season appear to have resonated with listeners. This song is also the oldest song among the 14 top songs [on Melon], showing immortal power beyond the long run. Through Ailee's emotions, I can feel that the ballad will have a long-lasting effect that the crowd would not grow tired even if the public continues to listen to them, and even though the issues related to the 'Goblin' are over."

Kim Eun-koo of Entertainment Naver wrote, "The popularity of 'I Will Go to You Like the First Snow' is intertwined with the popularity of the drama 'Goblin'. However, the first place on the annual music chart is a sign that the public has enjoyed it steadily since the end of the drama. If a song stays on a short-term chart and it's gone, no matter how early in the year it was released, it's difficult to be in first place on the annual chart. The power of music itself can not be neglected. Ailee's appeal and rich voice are very appealing to the public."

== Accolades ==
Year	Organization	Award	Result	Ref.
2017	Korea Cable TV Awards	Best Original Soundtrack Daesang	Won	
2017	Seoul International Drama Awards	Outstanding Korean Drama OST	Won	
2017	Soribada Best K-Music Awards	Best Hallyu OST	Won	
2017	Asia Artist Awards	Best OST Award	Won	
2017	Mnet Asian Music Awards	Best Original Soundtrack	Won	
2017	9th Melon Music Awards	Best OST Award	Won	
2017	9th Melon Music Awards	Song of the Year	Nominated	
2018	Golden Disc Awards	Best OST Award	Won	
2018	Seoul Music Awards	Best OST Award	Won	

== Commercial performance ==
"I Will Go to You Like the First Snow" was well received in its first week on music charts, debuting at number 19 on the South Korean Gaon Digital Chart on the week commencing January 1, 2017. On January 12, the song achieved a "Perfect All-Kill", hitting number 1 on all South Korean music sites listed on iChart. The following week, the single moved up 18 spots, topping the chart. On January 19, it was declared that the single achieved a "Triple Crown" for taking number 1 on the Gaon Digital Chart, Download Chart and Streaming Chart. On March 9, Gaon revealed the OST took first place on February's combined monthly digital chart. It was the second month in a row that the song has sat in this position, after also taking the top spot on the chart back in January. It is the first and currently only song to top the monthly chart for two different months in the Gaon Chart's history. "I Will Go to You Like the First Snow" was listened in TOP10 for 15 consecutive weeks in all Korean music source sites.

The single surpassed 100 million streams and 1.5 million downloads in May 2017, the first song released in 2017 to do so, making it the fastest song to have surpassed 100 million streams (20 weeks) in the chart's history, breaking Bolbbalgan4's previous record of 28 weeks. On June 5, 22 weeks after its release, the single broke the record for most streamed song per year on Gaon since 2010, with a total of 111,770,770 streams. On December 14, "I Will Go to You Like the First Snow" made history as it surpassed 165,307,579 streams, making it the most streamed song of all time on the chart. The record was previously held by Bolbbalgan4's "Galaxy".

On January 12, 2018, Gaon published their yearly digital, download and streaming charts, where "I Will Go to You Like the First Snow" came out in first place, achieving yet another triple crown. On July 26, 2018, Billboard Korea released a list of the top 100 songs in Korea for the first half of 2018. "I Will Go to You Like the First Snow" placed 95. Although it was not a high ranking, it was noteworthy that it was consistently ranked from the first of January 2018 to the summer season, more than a year after its release. On September 12, Gaon announced that the single surpassed the 2.5 million download and 200 million streams milestones in only 1 year and 4 months after it released.

== Charts ==
=== Weekly charts ===
Chart (2017)	Peak position
South Korea (Gaon)	1
US World Digital Songs (Billboard)	10

=== Yearly chart ===
Chart (2017)	Position
South Korea (Gaon)	1

Chart (2022)	Position
South Korea (Circle)	179

== Sales ==
Region	Sales
South Korea (Gaon)	5,000,000

== Release history ==
Region	Date	Format	Label
South Korea	January 7, 2017	Digital download, streaming	YMC Entertainment; CJ E&M
Various	January 6, 2017	Digital download, streaming	YMC Entertainment; CJ E&M
