= Good Enough (Chanyeol song) =

Single by Chanyeol
- Language: Korean
- Released: October 20, 2023
- Recorded: 2023
- Studio: SM Big Shot (Seoul)
- Genre: Synth-pop
- Length: 3:16
- Label: SM; Kakao
- Composers: Jake Davis; KillaGraham
- Lyricist: Loey
- Producers: Jake Davis; KillaGraham

Chanyeol singles chronology
| "Tomorrow" (2021) | "Good Enough" (2023) | "Black Out" (2024) |

Music video
- "Good Enough" on YouTube

"Good Enough" (그래도 돼; Geuraedo dwae; 'That's okay') is a song recorded by South Korean rapper Chanyeol that was released on October 20, 2023, by SM Entertainment and distributed by Kakao Entertainment as a standalone digital single.

The song was written by Chanyeol, and produced and composed by Jake Davis and KillaGaraham. Musically, "Good Enough" is described as an "easy listening" synth-pop song with instrumentation from synthesizer. The lyrics are heartwarming as they describe the uneasiness when following one's dreams.

While the song failed to chart domestically in the Circle Digital Chart, it debuted and peaked at number 8 in the US World Digital Song Sales chart.

== Background and release ==
Chanyeol began his musical career by joining the boy band Exo in 2012 as the last member to join the group. In 2014, he wrote the lyrics to "Run" from Exo's third EP and "Promise", which was included in their second studio album repackage. Chanyeol was featured on "Stay with Me" alongside singer Punch in 2016 which peaked at number three on the Gaon Digital Chart and World Digital Song Sales chart. Afterward, he became more involved in the group's songwriting process and was credited as a writer on several of the group's known hits: "Ko Ko Bop" (2017) and "Love Shot" (2018), and debuted alongside bandmate Sehun on sub-group Exo-SC the following year with the release of What a Life. In 2020, Chanyeol collaborated with labelmate Raiden for digital single "Yours" alongside singer Lee Hi and rapper Changmo. He released the digital single "Tomorrow" on April 6, 2021, as part of SM Station, after enlisting for his mandatory military service on March 29.

On October 16, 2023, SM Entertainment announced that Chanyeol would have a solo comeback on October 20 with "Good Enough" and mentioned that he was involved in penning the lyrics. Three days later, SM released a teaser for the music video at midnight which featured Chanyeol alongside bandmates Baekhyun, Chen, and D.O.

On October 20, the song was digitally released to various music streaming sites with the music video available on YouTube.

== Composition ==
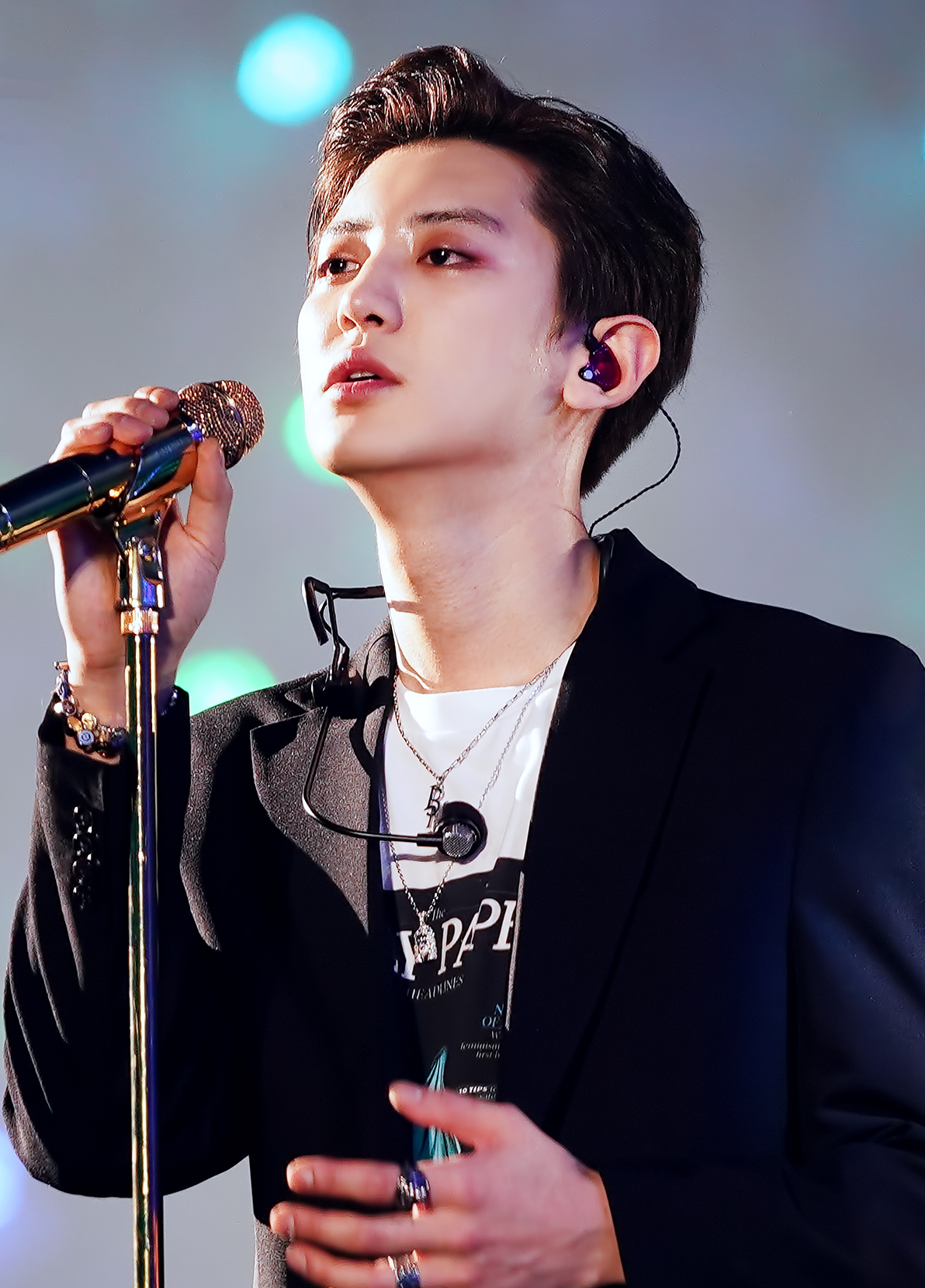
Chanyeol (pictured in December 2019) is credited as the sole lyricist of the song.

"Good Enough" was described by the press as an "easy listening synth-pop" song. The song used synthesizers in its production process. In terms of musical notation, the song is composed by Jake Davis and KillaGraham in the key of F major, with a tempo of 95 beats per minute that last three minutes and sixteen seconds long.

The lyrics were written by Chanyeol himself. Described as "heartwarming", the lyrics aimed to alleviate the uneasiness one may feel when following their dreams. Speaking of the song's contents, Chanyeol hoped the song "brought comfort to anyone who is going through difficult times."

== Music video ==
The accompanying music video for "Good Enough" was released on the same day on October 20. Emphasizing on chemistry, it features Chanyeol alongside bandmates Baekhyun, Chen, and D.O relaxing together.

On October 25 and October 31, Exo's YouTube channel uploaded behind-the-scenes videos of the music video and the recording process.

== Promotion and live performances ==
On October 24, Chanyeol performed the song live on GQ Live on YouTube hosted by GQ Korea. The song was featured on the set list of his fan meeting concert, "Chanyeol Fancon Tour 'The Eternity'".

== Commercial performance ==
"Good Enough" debuted and peaked in Billboard's World Digital Song Sales chart where it debuted and peaked at number 8, staying on the chart for a week.

== Credits and personnel ==
Credits adapted from Melon.

Studio

- SM Big Shot – recording, digital editing, engineered for mix, mixing
- 821 Sound Mastering – mastering

Personnel

- SM Entertainment – executive producer
- Jake Davis – producer, composition, arrangement
- KillaGraham – producer, composition, arrangement
- Chanyeol – vocals, lyrics
- ABOUT – vocal directing, background vocals
- Lee Min-kyu – recording, digital editing, engineered for mix, mixing
- Kwon Nam-woo – mastering

== Chart ==
Chart performance for "Good Enough"
| Chart (2023) | Peak position |
|---|---|
| South Korea Downloads (Circle) | 110 |
| US World Digital Song Sales (Billboard) | 8 |

== Release history ==
Release history for "Good Enough"
| Region | Date | Format | Label |
|---|---|---|---|
| Various | October 20, 2023 | Digital download; streaming | SM; Kakao |
