= Black Out (EP) =

- Digital cover

EP by Chanyeol
- Released: August 28, 2024
- Studio: SM Big Shot (Seoul)
- Genres: Rock; hip hop
- Length: 17:29
- Language: Korean
- Labels: SM; Kakao
- Producers: Johan Gustafsson; Joshua Murty; Red Triangle; Sam de Jong; Teodor Dahlbom

Chanyeol chronology
Black Out (2024)	Upside Down (2025)

Singles from Black Out
- 1. "Black Out" Released: August 28, 2024; 2. "Back Again" Released: September 6, 2024

Black Out is the debut extended play by South Korean rapper Chanyeol. It was released on August 28, 2024, by SM Entertainment through Kakao Entertainment, and contained six tracks, including the lead single of the same name.

== Background ==
On July 27, 2024, SM announced that Chanyeol would debut as a soloist in August 2024, and he would embark on his first solo concert titled "2024 Chanyeol Live Tour: City-scape", starting in Seoul on September 6 and 7. On August 9, SM confirmed the release date of Chanyeol's first EP Black Out to be on August 28, which contained six tracks including the lead single of the same name. In addition, the digital cover of the EP was revealed through Exo's social media accounts and was also available for pre-order at various online and offline music stores. The next three days, SM released the scheduler of the EP and revealed various teasing contents such as spoilers and teaser images, track posters, and music video teaser videos. On September 6, Park started promoting the b-side single track, "Back Again" releasing also a music video on the day of his first solo concert.

== Release and promotion ==
Black Out was released worldwide on August 28, 2024, by SM and Kakao. On the same day, Chanyeol held countdown live broadcast on Exo's YouTube, TikTok, and Weverse channels an hour before the release of the EP, to share the moment of his solo debut by communicating with the fans online around the world.

== Track listing ==
Black Out track listing
No.	Title	Lyrics	Music	Arrangement	Length
1.	"Black Out"	Lee Eun-song (Lalala Studio); Mola (PNP); Loey	James "Yami" Bell; Rasmus Budny; Gustav Nyström; Daniel Aldaz	Bell; Budny; Nyström; Aldaz	2:51
2.	"Hasta La Vista"	Park Tae-won	Rick Parkhouse; George Tizzard; Bell	Red Triangle	3:16
3.	"Ease Up"	Soyou (Lalala Studio); Loey	Sam de Jong; Rory Adams; Jon Visger; Isaiah Faber	de Jong	2:50
4.	"Back Again"	Ceramic Office (Artiffect)	Lachlan West; Julian Bell; Adrian Lyles	Lucky West	2:39
5.	"I'm on Your Side Too"	Loey	Joshua Murty; Jutes; Sarah Troy	Murty	2:55
6.	"Clover"	Woo Seung-yeon (153/Joombas); Loey	Johan Gustafsson; Teodor Dahlbom; Hugo Andersson; Rebecca James	Gustafsson; Dahlbom	2:58
Total length:					17:29

== Charts ==
=== Weekly charts ===
Weekly chart performance for Black Out
Chart (2024)	Peak position
Japanese Albums (Oricon)	16
Japanese Combined Albums (Oricon)	30
Japanese Hot Albums (Billboard Japan)	18
South Korean Albums (Circle)	3

=== Monthly charts ===
Monthly chart performance for Black Out
Chart (2024)	Position
South Korean Albums (Circle)	6

=== Year-end charts ===
Year-end chart performance for Black Out
Chart (2024)	Position
South Korean Albums (Circle)	69

== Certifications ==
Certifications for Black Out
Region	Certification	Certified units/sales
South Korea (KMCA)	Platinum	250,000^{^}
^{^} Shipments figures based on certification alone.

== Release history ==
Release history for Black Out
Region	Date	Format	Label
South Korea	August 28, 2024	CD	SM; Kakao
Various	August 28, 2024	Digital download; streaming	SM; Kakao
