= Let Me Love You (Junggigo and Chanyeol song) =

Single by Junggigo and Chanyeol

from the album Across the Universe
- Released: February 23, 2017
- Recorded: 2017
- Genre: K-pop
- Length: 3:30
- Label: Starship
- Songwriters: Junggigo; Brother Su
- Producers: Junggigo; Brother Su; Aev

Junggigo singles chronology
"Hey Bae" (2016)	"Let Me Love You" (2017)

Chanyeol singles chronology
"Stay with Me" (2016)	"Let Me Love You" (2017)	"We Young" (2018)

Music video
- "Let Me Love You" on YouTube

"Let Me Love You", is a song by South Korean singer Junggigo and South Korean rapper Chanyeol, a member of K-pop group EXO. It was released on February 23, 2017 by Starship Entertainment.

== Background and release ==
On February 16, 2017, Junggigo and Chanyeol were announced to be collaborating on a duet titled "Let Me Love You". The song is described as a melodic love confession song. On the same day, Junggigo's agency Starship Entertainment released a teaser image for the upcoming duet with the details of the song's title and the date of its release. On February 20, a teaser of the two artists recording the song was released. On February 23, midnight, the single was officially released. The song hit the #1 spot on four music charts and #2 on two music charts after its release.

== Track listing ==
No.	Title	Lyrics	Music	Arrangement	Length
1.	"Let Me Love You"	Junggigo, Brother Su	Junggigo, Brother Su, Aev	Aev	3:30
Total length:					3:30

== Charts ==
Chart (2017)	Peak position
South Korean Weekly Singles Chart (Gaon)	16
South Korean Monthly Singles Chart (Gaon)	78

== Sales ==
Region	Sales
South Korea (DL)	117,194+

== Release history ==
Region	Date	Format	Label
Various	February 22, 2016	Digital download; streaming	Starship; LOEN
South Korea	February 23, 2016	Digital download; streaming	Starship; LOEN
