= Guardian: The Lonely and Great God =

2016 South Korean TV series

- Promotional poster
- Also known as: Goblin
- Hangul: 쓸쓸하고 찬란하신 – 도깨비
- Hanja: 쓸쓸하고 찬란하神 – 도깨비
- Lit.: The Lonely and Great God – Dokkaebi
- RR: Sseulsseulhago challanhasin – dokkaebi
- MR: Ssŭlssŭrhago ch'allanhasin – tokkaebi
- Genre: Fantasy; Romantic comedy; Drama
- Created by: Studio Dragon
- Written by: Kim Eun-sook
- Directed by: Lee Eung-bok (Ep. 1–16); Kwon Hyuk-chan (Ep. 5–16); Yoon Jong-ho (Ep. 3–16)
- Creative directors: Yoon Jong-ho (Ep. 1–2); Jung Ji-hyun (Ep. 1–16); Kim Sung-jin (Ep. 1–16)
- Starring: Gong Yoo; Kim Go-eun; Lee Dong-wook; Yoo In-na; Yook Sung-jae
- Opening theme: "Round and Round" by Heize and Han Soo-ji
- Ending theme: "Stay With Me" by Chanyeol and Punch
- Composer: Nam Hye-seung
- Country of origin: South Korea
- Original language: Korean
- No. of episodes: 16 + 3 specials

Production
- Executive producers: Kim Beom-rae; Yoon Ha-rim
- Producers: Joo Kyung-ha; Kim Ji-yeon
- Production locations: Gimje, South Korea; Gangwon Province, South Korea; Seoul, South Korea; Quebec City, Quebec, Canada
- Cinematography: Park Sung-yong; Kang Yoon-soon
- Editor: Lee Sang-rok
- Camera setup: Single-camera
- Running time: 60–90 minutes
- Production company: Hwa&Dam Pictures

Original release
- Network: tvN
- Release: December 2, 2016 – January 21, 2017

Guardian: The Lonely and Great God (Korean: 쓸쓸하고 찬란하신 – 도깨비; RR: Sseulsseulhago challanhasin – dokkaebi) is a South Korean television series starring Gong Yoo in the title role, alongside Kim Go-eun, Lee Dong-wook, Yoo In-na, and Yook Sung-jae. Written by Kim Eun-sook, the series aired on tvN from December 2, 2016, to January 21, 2017.

Its final episode recorded an 18.68% nationwide audience share, making it the seventh highest-rated drama in Korean cable television history. It received critical acclaim and became a cultural phenomenon in South Korea. The series won numerous awards, including the Grand Prize (Daesang) for writer Kim Eun-sook and Best Actor for Gong Yoo at the 53rd Baeksang Arts Awards.

On 26 March 2026, tvN announced that the core cast would reunite for a "new travel-format" reunion show that would be scheduled to air in the first half of 2026, celebrating its 10th anniversary since airing.

== Plot ==
Kim Shin (Gong Yoo), a decorated military general from the Goryeo Dynasty, is framed as a traitor and killed by the young king. Years after his death, he is cursed by the Almighty to stay immortal forever, enduring the pain of seeing his loved ones die as punishment for the soldiers he killed to protect his country. Kim Shin becomes an immortal goblin, helping people with his powers and being a kind man despite his tragic past. The only person that can end his immortality is the Goblin's bride, who can pull the sword that has been embedded in him.

Ji Eun-tak (Kim Go-eun), a high school student, has a bubbly personality despite her tragic life. She can see ghosts, but tries to ignore them. Eun-tak summons the Goblin by chance and their fates begin to entwine. The Goblin's nephew, Yoo Deok-hwa (Yook Sung-jae), leases the Goblin's house to a Grim Reaper (Lee Dong-wook) and the two end up living under the same roof. Eun-tak starts working a part-time job at a chicken restaurant managed by a charismatic young woman named Sunny (Yoo In-na).

== Cast ==
=== Main ===
- Gong Yoo as Goblin / Kim Shin

A 939-year-old immortal Dokkaebi or Goblin and protector of souls in search for his bride, who is the only one who can remove the sword piercing through his chest. Once the sword is removed, he may finally move to the afterlife and rest in peace. He served as a General during the Goryeo era, where he was appointed as the regent with his sister being betrothed to the young king Wang Yeo. However, due to being corrupted by a eunuch, the king's guards killed Kim Shin's sister, soldiers; and household before ultimately killing him with the very sword that is lodged in his chest. As both a reward for the good he had done for his country, and a punishment for all the deaths that he caused, the Almighty God grants him immortality. Because he has lived for centuries, he feels lonely and depressed as he watches his loved ones and those around him pass away over time. This is until he slowly falls in love with his bride who gives him a reason to live again.

- Kim Go-eun as Ji Eun-tak

An optimistic and bubbly 19-year-old high school student and the legendary Goblin's bride. A "Missing Soul", she can see ghosts and summon the Goblin due to her way of birth; her pregnant mom was in a hit-and-run at the time. The Goblin had intervened to save them both, before the Grim Reaper could take them. Orphaned at the age of nine and pursued by the Grim Reaper, she was forced to live with her abusive aunt who only wanted the life insurance money left behind by Eun-tak's mother. She immediately becomes interested in the Goblin, who takes her in his home so she can pass her exams and enroll in university, while he begins to rediscover the joy of living through her. Originally oblivious to her duty of removing the sword from the Goblin's chest, she eventually learns the truth and struggles with the decision of fulfilling her duty as she has fallen in love with the Goblin.

- Lee Dong-wook as Grim Reaper / Wang Yeo
  - Kim Min-jae as young Wang Yeo

A good-looking and cynical, yet humorous jeoseung saja, or grim reaper, who guides souls to their reincarnations or afterlives and Kim Shin's housemate. Along with many other grim reapers, he became a grim reaper after committing the greatest sin of all in his past life. He has no memory of his past lives but does possess supernatural powers. Originally preferring to be by himself, he falls in love with a chicken restaurant owner named Sunny who eventually reciprocates his feelings. Through her, he begins to unlock clues to his memories and who he was in the past. It is revealed that he was the young king, Wang Yeo in his past life. Despite the king's original pleasant personality, he became corrupted by the power hungry eunuch and ordered his guards to kill everyone including his own wife and his loyal general, Kim Shin. This act slowly drove Wang Yeo insane and caused him to ultimately take his own life.

- Yoo In-na as Sunny / Kim Sun

The attractive owner of a chicken restaurant who hires Ji Eun-tak. The Grim Reaper begins to fall in love with her, and she soon returns his affection, although she is constantly confused by the Grim Reaper's constant social awkwardness. In her past life, it is revealed that she was the younger sister of General Kim Shin and she became the queen upon marrying King Wang Yeo (now the Grim Reaper). The couple were happily in love until the eunuch began to warp the mind of the king. When Wang Yeo tried to exile his loyal general Kim Shin, she supported her brother as he stood up to the king's ridiculous order and was executed as a result.

- Yook Sung-jae as Yoo Deok-hwa
  - Jung Ji-hoon as young Yoo Deok-hwa
  - Kim Hyun-bin as teenage Deok-hwa

A rebellious yet kind-hearted chaebol heir and the only grandson of the Yoo family, a household that has the responsibility of taking care of the Goblin. He originally is a spoiled young adult who was only looking after the Goblin to receive a new credit card after he was cut off. However, he learns of the Goblin and the Grim Reaper's true identities, and the trio grew to become strong friends. It is later revealed that the Almighty had taken over his body for a period of time so that he could enact his plan of intertwining the lives of Kim Shin, Ji Eun-tak, The Grim Reaper, and Sunny.

=== Supporting ===
- Lee El as Samshin, Goddess, the creator of birth and fate
- Kim Byung-chul as Park Joong-heon, a cunning and manipulative eunuch from the Goryeo period who raised Wang Yeo
- Kim Sung-kyum as Chairman Yoo Shin-woo, Deok-hwa's grandfather
- Jo Woo-jin as Kim Do-young, Deok-hwa's secretary
- Yeom Hye-ran as Ji Yeon-sook, Eun-tak's maternal aunt
- Jung Young-gi as Park Kyung-shik, Eun-tak's male cousin
- Choi Ri as Park Kyung-mi, Eun-tak's female cousin

=== Others ===
- Hwang Seok-jeong as triplet sisters; two of them as a shaman fortune teller and a ghost
- Ham Sung-min as North Korean soldier

==== Ghosts around Eun-tak ====
- Ahn Ji-hyun as Go Jung-hyun, the ghost in the library who was Eun-tak's mother's best friend
- Park Kyung-hye as Virgin Ghost, who always tries to take Eun-tak with her
- Park Se-wan as Go Shi-won, the ghost who asked Eun-tak to clean her dormitory and fill it up with food so that her mother will not be sad (Ep. 2, 4–5)
- Kim So-ra as Lee Jung-hwa, a vengeance ghost whose husband killed her (Ep. 4, 6–7, 9, 11)
- Go Soo-jung as a ghost (Ep. 2)

==== People around Eun-tak ====
- Noh Gang-min as the boy in the back-alley of the chicken shop who thinks he has wind powers
- Kim Min-young as Park Soo-jin, Eun-tak's schoolmate who harasses her and takes pictures of her and the Goblin
- Go Bo-gyeol as Kim Yoon-ah, Eun-tak's class president who defends her and later becomes her friend
- Kim Nan-hee as Eun-tak's homeroom teacher who discriminates against her because she's an orphan
- Ma Min-hee as one of Soo-jin's friends
- Yoon Hee-kyung as one of Soo-jin's friends

==== Grim Reapers around Wang Yeo ====
- Kim Ki-doo as a Batch 21 Grim Reaper who is Wang Yeo's friend and colleague and is very serious about his work
- Choi Woong as Wang Yeo's junior grim reaper who lives in the rooftop above Sunny's apartment
- Jo Hyun-sik as a Batch 22 Grim Reaper
- Kim Chang-hwan as a Batch 23 Grim Reaper
- Yun Da-yeong as a Batch 23 Grim Reaper who was once Wang Yeo's Court Lady

==== Others ====
- Kim Nam-hee as Overworked doctor in ER
- Yoon Kyung-ho as Kim Woo-sik, Kim Shin's loyal lieutenant from the Goryeo era (Ep. 1, 12, 14)
- Lee Moon-soo as a loyal old man from the Goryeo era who kept Kim Shin's body (Ep. 1)
- Nam Da-reum as Kim Soo-bok, the boy who met the Goblin in Paris (Ep. 1, 4)
- Park Jin Woo as Loan Shark (Ep. 2–3, 6)
- Yoon Joo-man as Loan Shark (Ep. 2–3, 6)
- Lee Seul-bi as a vain woman at café (Ep. 3)
- Kim Hyun-mok as Bus Passenger (Ep. 8)
- Kim Hye-yoon as the young era of a widowed old lady (Ep. 15)

=== Special appearances ===
- Park Hee-von as Ji Yeon-hee, Ji Eun-tak's mother (Ep. 1, 7)
- Kim Min-jae as Wang Yeo (Ep. 1, 7–13)
- Kim So-hyun as Kim Shin's sister (Queen)
- Jung Hae-in as Choi Tae-hee, Ji Eun-tak's first love (Ep. 7, 8)

== Production ==
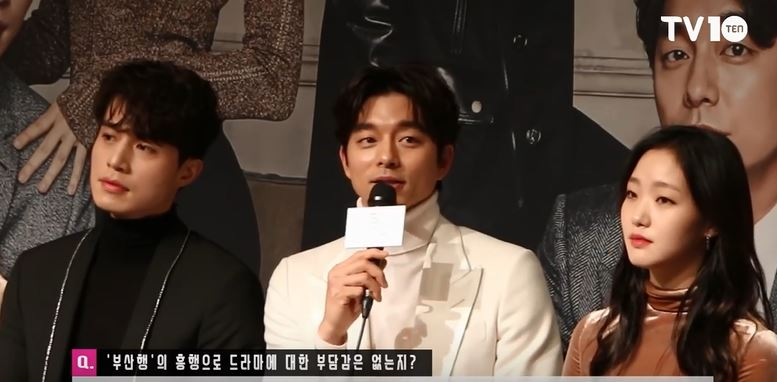
Lee, Gong and Kim at the drama's press conference, November 2016

=== Development ===
The series was written by Kim Eun-sook, who also wrote the popular series Secret Garden (2010), The Heirs (2013), and Descendants of the Sun (2016). The drama marked her second collaboration with director Lee Eun-bok after both worked on Descendants.

=== Filming ===
The first script-reading was held at Nuri Dream Square in Sangam-dong, Seoul, South Korea, on 30 August 2016. The Goryeo-era flashback scenes were filmed on Gimje, North Jeolla Province on September 22 for the battlefield scenes, while the palace scenes were shot at Naju Image Theme Park. Goblin and Grim Reaper's house (external shots) was filmed at (formerly) Unhyeongung's Western House, presently inside Duksung Women's University (utilized for administration offices).

Overseas filming mainly took place in Quebec City, Quebec, Canada in October, using locations such as the Château Frontenac, Parc du Bastion-de-la-Reine (the Yoo family cemetery), Petit Champlain (Goblin's door to Canada), and the Fontaine de Tourny. The red door, which in reality is the emergency exit of the Théâtre Petit Champlain, and other sites in Quebec City associated with the show have begun to attract numerous fans of the series.

The crew was awarded a special vacation to Phuket, Thailand after the end of the drama.

=== Original soundtrack ===
==== Album ====
Guardian (Original Television Soundtrack)

Soundtrack album
- Studio: CJ E&M Music Studios
- Genre: Soundtrack
- Languages: Korean, English
- Labels: CJ E&M, Hwa&Dam Pictures; Pony Canyon (Japan); Able9 (China)

Disc 1
No.	Title	Artist	Length
1.	"Round and Round"	Heize & Han Soo-ji	3:27
2.	"Stay With Me"	Chanyeol & Punch	3:12
3.	"My Eyes" (내 눈에만 보여)	10cm	2:37
4.	"Hush"	Lasse Lindh	4:20
5.	"Beautiful"	Crush	3:47
6.	"You Are So Beautiful" (이쁘다니까)	Eddy Kim	3:15
7.	"Who Are You"	Sam Kim	4:21
8.	"I Miss You"	Soyou	2:49
9.	"First Snow" (첫 눈)	Jung Joon-il	4:56
10.	"I Will Go to You Like the First Snow" (첫눈처럼 너에게 가겠다)	Ailee	3:49
11.	"Wish" (소원)	Urban Zakapa	3:56
12.	"Heaven"	Roy Kim & Kim EZ	4:19
13.	"Love"	Mamamoo	2:57
14.	"And I'm Here"	Kim Kyung-hee	4:07
15.	"Winter is Coming"	Han Soo-ji	2:30
16.	"Stuck in Love"	Kim Kyung-hee	2:39
Total length:			57:01

Disc 2
No.	Title	Artist	Length
1.	"Dark Walk"	Various Artists	4:34
2.	"Butterfly" (나비)	Various Artists	1:13
3.	"First Love" (처음사랑)	Various Artists	4:54
4.	"When You Open the Door" (문을 열고 나가면)	Various Artists	3:15
5.	"Eun-tak's Waltz" (은탁의 왈츠)	Various Artists	3:04
6.	"Sparkling Wind" (반짝이는 바람)	Various Artists	3:12
7.	"Small Beach House" (바닷가 작은집)	Various Artists	1:25
8.	"When Time Stops" (시간이 멈출 때)	Various Artists	2:25
9.	"One Day After A Hundred Years" (그렇게 백년을 살아 어느날)	Various Artists	0:18
10.	"Amnesia (기억상실)"	Various Artists	3:07
11.	"Their Only Moments" (그들만의 시간)	Various Artists	2:06
12.	"No God's Sword" (무신검)	Various Artists	1:02
13.	"The Future I Saw Was Right" (내가 본 미래가 맞았구나)	Various Artists	0:34
14.	"Whistling" (휘파람을 불며)	Various Artists	2:35
15.	"Samshin & Deok-hwa" (삼신과 덕화)	Various Artists	2:10
16.	"Feast of the Deities" (신들의 만찬)	Various Artists	3:01
17.	"Pray" (기도)	Various Artists	1:45
18.	"For That Excuse, I Wish I Could Stay Alive" (그 핑계로 내가 계속 살아 있었으면 좋겠어)	Various Artists	0:54
19.	"Warriors Song"	Various Artists	4:34
Total length:			46:08

==== Singles ====
Original soundtrack (Part 1–14)

Part 1

No.	Title	Artists	Length
1.	"Stay with Me"	Chanyeol, Punch	03:13
2.	"Stay with Me" (Inst.)		03:13
Total length:			06:26

Part 2

No.	Title	Artists	Length
1.	"Only in My Eyes" (내 눈에만 보여)	10cm	02:37
2.	"Only in My Eyes" (Inst.)		02:37
Total length:			05:14

Part 3

No.	Title	Artists	Length
1.	"Hush"	Lasse Lindh	04:20
Total length:			04:20

Part 4

No.	Title	Artists	Length
1.	"Beautiful"	Crush	3:48
2.	"Beautiful" (Inst.)		3:48
Total length:			7:36

Part 5

No.	Title	Artists	Length
1.	"You Are So Beautiful" (이쁘다니까)	Eddy Kim	03:16
2.	"You Are So Beautiful" (Inst.)		03:16
Total length:			06:32

Part 6

No.	Title	Artists	Length
1.	"Who Are You"	Sam Kim	04:16
2.	"Who Are You" (Inst.)		04:16
Total length:			08:32

Part 7

No.	Title	Artists	Length
1.	"I Miss You"	Soyou	02:50
2.	"I Miss You" (Inst.)		02:50
Total length:			05:40

Part 8

No.	Title	Artists	Length
1.	"First Snow" (첫눈)	Jung Joon-il	04:57
2.	"First Snow" (Inst.)		04:57
Total length:			09:54

Part 9

No.	Title	Artist	Length
1.	"I Will Go to You Like the First Snow" (첫눈처럼 너에게 가겠다)	Ailee	03:50
2.	"I Will Go to You Like the First Snow" (Inst.)		03:50
Total length:			07:40

Part 10

No.	Title	Artists	Length
1.	"Wish" (소원)	Urban Zakapa	03:56
2.	"Wish" (Inst.)		03:56
Total length:			07:52

Part 11

No.	Title	Artists	Length
1.	"And I'm Here"	Kim Kyung-hee (April 2nd)	04:08
2.	"Winter Is Coming"	Han Soo-ji	02:30
3.	"Stuck in Love"	Kim Kyung-hee (April 2nd)	02:39
Total length:			09:17

Part 12

No.	Title	Artists	Length
1.	"Heaven"	Roy Kim, Kim EZ (GGot Jam Project)	04:20
2.	"Heaven" (Inst.)		04:20
Total length:			08:40

Part 13

No.	Title	Artists	Length
1.	"Love"	Mamamoo	02:58
2.	"Love" (Inst.)		02:58
Total length:			05:56

Part 14

There was a controversy surrounding the release of the song "Round and Round". Originally, the song was sung by Han Soo-ji. However, when the song was officially released, Han was merely a featuring on the track, which was sung by Heize. This caused dissatisfaction among fans, who loved Han's voice. CJ E&M released an official apology, saying that Han was enlisted to record just the first 50 seconds of the song, but the writer of the song, Nam Hye-seung, requested since the beginning that the full song be sung by another vocalist.

No.	Title	Artists	Length
1.	"Round and Round"	Heize and Han Soo-ji	03:22
2.	"Round and Round" (Inst.)		03:22
Total length:			06:44

=== Chart performance ===
Songs

Title	Year	Peak chart positions		Sales	Remarks
Title	Year	KOR Gaon	US World	Sales	Remarks
"Stay With Me" (Chanyeol (EXO), Punch)	2016	3	3	KOR: 1,792,463+	Part 1
"My Eyes" (10cm)	2016	7	—	KOR: 796,044+	Part 2
"Hush" (Lasse Lindh)	2016	6	—	KOR: 745,412+	Part 3
"Beautiful" (Crush)	2016	2	7	KOR: 2,051,618+	Part 4
"You Are So Beautiful" (Eddy Kim)	2016	5	—	KOR: 1,258,363+	Part 5
"Who Are You" (Sam Kim)	2016	3	15	KOR: 1,081,090+	Part 6
"I Miss You" (Soyou (Sistar))	2016	5	11	KOR: 1,253,414+	Part 7
"First Snow" (Jung Joon-il)	2016	9	—	KOR: 1,034,874+	Part 8
"I Will Go to You Like the First Snow" (Ailee)	2017	1	10	KOR: 2,488,341+	Part 9
"Wish" (Urban Zakapa)	2017	2	—	KOR: 816,149+	Part 10
"And I'm Here" (Kim Kyung-hee (April 2))	2017	34	18	KOR: 170,382+	Part 11
"Winter is Coming" (Han Soo-ji)	2017	56	—	KOR: 91,003+	Part 11
"Stuck in Love" (Kim Kyung-hee (April 2))	2017	63	—	KOR: 81,075+	Part 11
"HEAVEN" (Roy Kim, Kim EZ (GGot Jam Project))	2017	16	—	KOR: 292,137+	Part 12
"LOVE" (Mamamoo)	2017	4	—	KOR: 444,958+	Part 13
"Round and Round" (Heize & Han Soo-ji)	2017	4	4	KOR: 482,693+	Part 14
"—" denotes releases that did not chart or were not released in that region.

Album

Title	Album details	Peak chart positions	Sales
Title	Album details	KOR	Sales
Goblin OST Pack	Released: January 25, 2017; Label: CJ E&M; Formats: CD, digital download	1	KOR: 75,397+; CHN: 20,005,638+

== Reception ==
The series was popular among the international audience, which led to parodies of the drama on various social media sites, notably by both celebrities and political figures.

The drama has also sparked various fashion trends. Items and accessories worn by the cast members, such as the Lanvin coat worn by Gong Yoo, Lancôme lipstick used by Kim Go-eun and Fedora worn by Lee Dong-wook saw an increase in sales. Kim In-yook's poetry book, The Physics of Love, gained renewed attention after one of its verses was featured in the drama. There was also an increase in visitors at the various filming sites of Guardian, which contributed to a positive economic effect on the country. Additionally, original soundtracks featured in the series also topped local digital music charts. Since 2017, it has surpassed Descendants of the Sun (2016) in video-on-demand sales.

The Korea Times stated, "Its success was attributed to the creative plot" and "...the depth of perspective looking at life of the goblin that bears a bloody sword in his chest and has been given eternal life as punishment, immerses the audience into the fantasy story. The twist and complexity of life and death make the story more interesting."

Despite its success, Guardian was criticized for its several consumer product placements which drew an estimated 2-4 billion KRW from revenue. TV and cultural critics also criticized some aspects of the drama; such as the Cinderella complex feature in the series, where female lead is able to summon the male lead, who has supernatural powers. Furthermore, the female lead portrayed a poor high school student attracted to the male lead's rich 30-something man, which the show poked fun of when a classmate described him as a "sugar daddy". The drama was also criticized for its over-dramatic plot.

=== Viewership ===
The drama consistently topped cable television viewership ratings in its time slot. Its final episode recorded an 18.680% nationwide audience share according to Nielsen paid platform, making the episode the second highest rated in Korean cable television history at that time. It became the first cable drama to surpass 20% ratings.

Ep.	Original broadcast date	Average audience share		
Ep.	Original broadcast date	AGB Nielsen		TNmS
Ep.	Original broadcast date	Nationwide	Seoul	Nationwide
1	December 2, 2016	6.322%	7.540%	6.7%
2	December 3, 2016	7.904%	10.024%	8.1%
3	December 9, 2016	12.471%	14.274%	12.0%
4	December 10, 2016	11.373%	13.768%	12.7%
5	December 16, 2016	11.507%	12.075%	14.0%
6	December 17, 2016	11.618%	14.772%	13.0%
7	December 23, 2016	12.297%	13.993%	13.8%
8	December 24, 2016	12.344%	14.748%	11.6%
9	December 30, 2016	12.933%	13.333%	14.6%
10	December 31, 2016	12.702%	14.551%	13.3%
11	January 6, 2017	13.894%	15.749%	14.8%
12	January 7, 2017	13.712%	15.680%	14.6%
13	January 13, 2017	14.254%	16.525%	15.3%
14	January 20, 2017 (Note: Episode 14 was postponed as additional time was needed to work on the special graphics.)	16.043%	17.767%	16.3%
15	January 21, 2017 (Note: Episodes 15 and 16 were shown back-to-back on January 21, 2017.)	16.917%	18.829%	17.7%
16	January 21, 2017	18.680%	20.986%	19.6%
Average		12.811%	14.663%	13.6%
Special	January 14, 2017	9.427%	11.786%	9.1%
Special	February 3, 2017	3.606%	5.050%	3.9%
Special	February 4, 2017	4.075%	5.582%	4.2%
In this table, the blue numbers represent the lowest ratings and the red numbers represent the highest ratings.; This series aired on a cable channel/pay TV which normally has a relatively smaller audience compared to free-to-air TV/public broadcasters (KBS, SBS, MBC and EBS).

== Awards and nominations ==
Year	Award	Category	Recipient	Result	Ref.
2017	First Brand Awards	Special Award	Guardian: The Lonely and Great God	Won	
2017	11th Korean Cable TV Awards	Best Drama	Guardian: The Lonely and Great God	Won	
2017	11th Korean Cable TV Awards	Best OST	Ailee (I Will Go to You Like the First Snow)	Won	
2017	11th Korean Cable TV Awards	Rising Star Award	Yook Sung-jae	Won	
2017	11th Korean Cable TV Awards	VOD Broadcasting	Guardian: The Lonely and Great God	Won	
2017	5th Annual DramaFever Awards	Best Actor	Gong Yoo	Won	
2017	5th Annual DramaFever Awards	Best Supporting Actor	Lee Dong-wook	Won	
2017	5th Annual DramaFever Awards	Best Supporting Actress	Yoo In-na	Won	
2017	5th Annual DramaFever Awards	Best Couple	Gong Yoo & Kim Go-eun	Won	
2017	5th Annual DramaFever Awards	Best Melodrama	Guardian: The Lonely and Great God	Won	
2017	53rd Baeksang Arts Awards	Grand Prize (Daesang)	Kim Eun-sook	Won	
2017	53rd Baeksang Arts Awards	Best Drama	Guardian: The Lonely and Great God	Nominated	
2017	53rd Baeksang Arts Awards	Best Director	Lee Eung-bok	Nominated	
2017	53rd Baeksang Arts Awards	Best Screenplay	Kim Eun-sook	Nominated	
2017	53rd Baeksang Arts Awards	Best Actor	Gong Yoo	Won	
2017	53rd Baeksang Arts Awards	Best Actress	Kim Go-eun	Nominated	
2017	12th Asia Model Awards	Asia OST Popularity	Chanyeol (EXO), Punch (Stay With Me)	Won	
2017	Brand of the Year Awards	Actor of the Year	Gong Yoo	Won	
2017	12th Seoul International Drama Awards	Outstanding Korean Drama OST	Ailee (I Will Go to You Like the First Snow)	Won	
2017	1st Soribada Best K-Music Awards	Best Hallyu OST	Ailee (I Will Go to You Like the First Snow)	Won	
2017	10th Korea Drama Awards	Best Drama	Guardian: The Lonely and Great God	Won	
2017	10th Korea Drama Awards	Best Production Director	Lee Eung-bok	Nominated	
2017	10th Korea Drama Awards	Best Screenplay	Kim Eun-sook	Nominated	
2017	10th Korea Drama Awards	Top Excellence Award, Actor	Lee Dong-wook	Nominated	
2017	10th Korea Drama Awards	Top Excellence Award, Actress	Kim Go-eun	Nominated	
2017	10th Korea Drama Awards	Excellence Award, Actress	Yoo In-na	Nominated	
2017	10th Korea Drama Awards	Best New Actor	Yook Sung-jae	Won	
2017	10th Korea Drama Awards	Best Original Soundtrack	Crush (Beautiful)	Nominated	
2017	10th Korea Drama Awards	Best Original Soundtrack	Soyou (I Miss You)	Nominated	
2017	10th Korea Drama Awards	Star of the Year Award	Yook Sung-jae	Won	
2017	10th Korea Drama Awards	Popular Character Award	Kim Byung-chul	Won	
2017	10th Korea Drama Awards	Popular Character Award	Park Kyung-hye	Won	
2017	3rd Fashionista Awards	Best Fashionista – TV & Film Division	Gong Yoo	Nominated	
2017	3rd Fashionista Awards	Best Fashionista – TV & Film Division	Yoo In-na	Nominated	
2017	3rd Fashionista Awards	Global Icon	Lee Dong-wook	Nominated	
2017	2nd Asia Artist Awards	Best OST Award	Ailee (I Will Go to You Like the First Snow)	Won	
2017	22nd Asian Television Awards	Best Drama Series	Guardian: The Lonely and Great God	Nominated	
2017	19th Mnet Asian Music Awards	Best OST	Chanyeol (Exo), Punch (Stay With Me)	Nominated	
2017	19th Mnet Asian Music Awards	Best OST	Crush (Beautiful)	Nominated	
2017	19th Mnet Asian Music Awards	Best OST	Ailee (I Will Go to You Like the First Snow)	Won	
2017	9th Melon Music Awards	Song of the Year	Ailee (I Will Go to You Like the First Snow)	Nominated	
2017	9th Melon Music Awards	Best OST Award	Ailee (I Will Go to You Like the First Snow)	Won	
2017	9th Melon Music Awards	Kakao Hot Star	Ailee (I Will Go to You Like the First Snow)	Nominated	
2017	9th Melon Music Awards	Kakao Hot Star	Crush (Beautiful)	Nominated	
2018	32nd Golden Disc Awards	Best OST Award	Ailee (I Will Go to You Like the First Snow)	Won	
2018	27th Seoul Music Awards	Best OST Award	Ailee (I Will Go to You Like the First Snow)	Won	

=== Listicles ===
Name of publisher, year listed, name of listicle, recipient and placement
Publisher	Year	Listicle	Recipient	Placement	Ref.
Gallup Korea	2024	Best Television Couple of the Past 10 Years	Gong Yoo and Kim Go-eun	2nd	
