= The Box (2021 South Korean film) =

2021 South Korean musical film

- Theatrical release poster
- Hangul: 더 박스
- RR: Deo bakseu
- MR: Tŏ paksŭ
- Directed by: Yang Jung-woong
- Screenplay by: Yang Jung-woong
- Starring: Park Chanyeol; Jo Dal-hwan
- Music by: Score: Ecobridge
- Production company: Studio Take
- Distributed by: Cine Pilwoon Co., Ltd.
- Release date: 24 March 2021
- Running time: 94 minutes
- Country: South Korea
- Language: Korean
- Box office: est. US$0.84 million

The Box (Korean: 더 박스; RR: Deo bakseu) is a 2021 South Korean musical road film directed by Yang Jung-woong for Yeonghwasa Take Co., Ltd. The film starring Park Chanyeol and Jo Dal-hwan, is about an aspiring singer and a washed-up music producer and their musical journey. The film was theatrically released on March 24, 2021, by Cine Pilwoon Co., Ltd.

== Cast ==
- Park Chanyeol as Ji Hoon
- Jo Dal-hwan as Min-su
- Kim Ji-hyun as Na-na
- Song Seung-hwan as Audition Judge
- Gaeko - Cameo
- Kang Joo-hee (Rothy) - Cameo

== Production ==
=== Theme ===
The film is a road film in which two people an aspiring singer and a washed out music producer embark on a musical journey across the country. It is a jukebox musical containing familiar popular songs from world music as; Coldplay, Billie Eilish, Chet Baker, Mariah Carey, Pharrell Williams and famous Korean songs in the backdrop of South Korean locales.

=== Casting ===
On 30 July 2020, the SM Entertainment agency announced that Park Chanyeol was confirmed to appear in musical film.

=== Filming ===
Principal photography of the film began in the end of August 2020.

== Release ==
It was announced on March 27, that the film will be released in thirty two International markets.

The Box is scheduled to be released in 11 countries including USA, Singapore, Indonesia, Vietnam, Japan and Australia. It will be released in Singapore on April 1, 2021, in Indonesia on April 7, 2021, and Malaysia on April 8, 2021.

== Original soundtrack ==
The Box

Soundtrack album by Various
- Released: March 25, 2021
- Recorded: 2020–21
- Genre: Soundtrack
- Length: 58:35
- Languages: Korean; English
- Labels: Dreamus; Studio Take
- Producer: Echo Bridge
Audio Full Album
- Full album The Box OST on YouTube
- Full album The Box OST on Spotify

60,000 albums of original soundtrack of the film were pre-sold before its release on March 31. The box album debuted at number 4 iTunes global albums, with all songs charting in more than 6 countries.

There are 18 tracks in the album:
No.	Title	Lyrics	Music	Artist	Length
1.	"Break Your Box"	Chanyeol	Chanyeol	CHANYEOL	3:15
2.	"Cowboys & Aliens"	Chimmi	Peter of CHIMMI	Peter of CHIMMI	4:00
3.	"Bad Guy"	Billie Eilish, Finneas O'Connell	CHANYEOL	CHANYEOL	2:57
4.	"Without You"	Pete Ham, Tom Evans	CHANYEOL	CHANYEOL	2:55
5.	"Heaven"	Aancod	Aancod	Aancod	2:00
6.	"Happy"	Pharrell Williams	Aancod, CHANYEOL	CHANYEOL, Aancod	2:32
7.	"Break Your Box" (Lite Version)	Ecobridge	Ecobridge	Ecobridge	2:42
8.	"Summertime"	Dorothy Heyward, George Gershwin, DuBose Heyward, Ira Gershwin	Kim Ji-Hyun	Kim Ji-Hyun	3:14
9.	"My Funny Valentine"	Lorenz Hart, Richard Rodgers	CHANYEOL	CHANYEOL	2:42
10.	"What a Wonderful World"	George David Weiss, Bob Thiele	CHANYEOL & Kim Ji-Hyun	CHANYEOL & Kim Ji-Hyun	3:26
11.	"Raining"	Ecobridge	CHANYEOL	CHANYEOL	4:06
12.	"One Day" (어느 날 문득)	Ecobridge	Ecobridge	Ecobridge	4:30
13.	"Everyday With You" (매일 그대와)	Choi Sung-won	CHANYEOL	CHANYEOL	2:05
14.	"Captain No.7" (캡틴)	Park Ju-won	Park Juwon & Danny Koo	Park Juwon, Danny Koo	2:23
15.	"When I am in Busan" (부산에 가면)	Ecobridge	CHO DAL-HWAN	CHO DAL-HWAN	3:11
16.	"A Sky Full of Stars"	Guy Berryman, Jonny Buckland, Will Champion, Chris Martin, Tim Bergling	CHANYEOL	CHANYEOL	4:13
17.	"Break Your Box" (Acoustic Version)	Chanyeol, Ecobridge	Chanyeol	CHANYEOL	3:44
18.	"Break Your Box" (Hidden Track)	Chanyeol, Ecobridge	Chanyeol	CHANYEOL	4:40

== Reception ==
=== Box office ===
The film was released on March 24, 2021, on 372 screens. It opened at first place on the box office getting more than thirty thousand admissions on its first day.

According to Korean Film Council data†, it is at 20th place among all the Korean films released in the year 2021, with gross of US$0.85 million and 122,469 admissions, as of December 12, 2021.

- †The system of KOBIS (Korean Box Office Information System) is managed by KOFIC.

=== Critical response ===
Going by Korean review aggregator Naver Movie Database, the film holds an approval rating of 8.63 from the audience.

Brian Tan from Yahoo Style rating the film with 3.5 out of 5 stars, praised Chanyeol for his "beautifully rendered vocals and acoustics throughout the movie" in his review. He praised Chanyeol for his ability to convey the cuteness, introversion, and most vulnerable moments of the main character. Several reviewers have cited the lack of a consistent plot and dialogue as some of the sites of improvement.

Fred Hawson reviewing for ABS-CBN News wrote that the main attraction of the film is the lead performance of EXO member Chanyeol and his song recordings. He opined that making the film a road trip added to the appeal of the director Jung-woong's concept. Explaining the premise behind the story of the film, Hawson wrote, "... simple premise -- a talented musical artist who could not bring himself to perform his music in front of people, and the producer who trusted that talent enough to spend time and money hopefully to bring him out of his shell (or box)."

Korean entertainment news site The Seoul Story praised Chanyeol's baritone singing, stating that it will "trap viewer's hearts". It was pointed out that the storyline was too predictable, but the overall viewing experience was still quite enjoyable and "light hearted."
