= Rothy =

South Korean singer

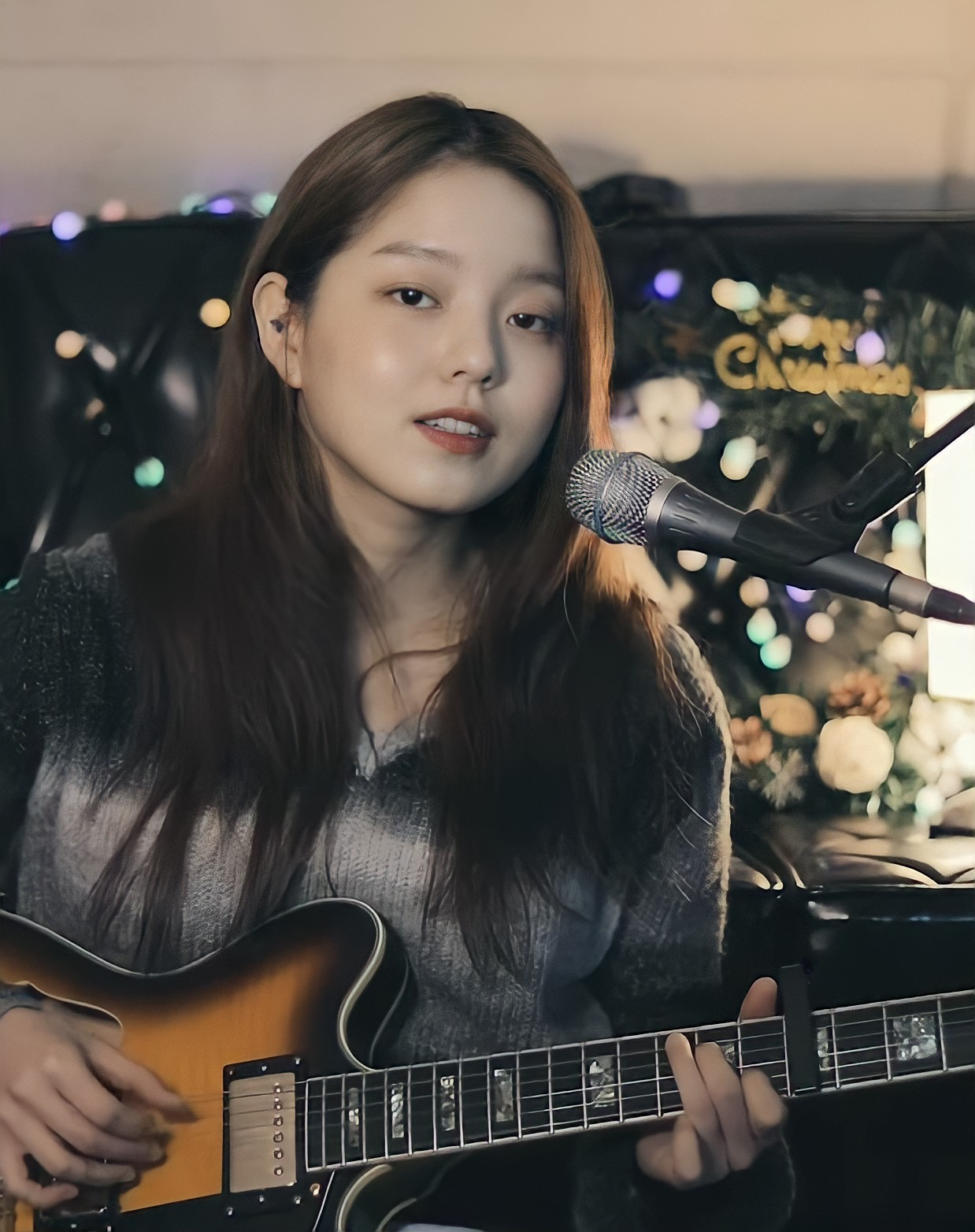
- Rothy in December 2020
- Born: Kang Joo-hee; May 6, 1999 (age 27); Incheon, South Korea
- Occupation: Singer
- Musical career
- Genres: Ballad; K-pop; Dance; Electronica
- Instruments: Vocals; Guitar
- Years active: 2017–present
- Label: Dorothy Company

Korean name
- Hangul: 강주희
- RR: Gang Juhui
- MR: Kang Chuhŭi

Kang Joo-hee (Korean: 강주희, born May 6, 1999), better known by the stage name Rothy (로시), is a South Korean singer. She made her debut on November 9, 2017, with the digital single "Stars". She was known as "Shin Seung-hun's Muse" by reporters.

== Early life ==
Rothy attended Incheon Annam Middle School. She graduated from the Department of Applied Music at Hanlim Multi Art School.

== Career ==
=== 2013–2016: Pre-debut ===
After auditioning in middle school, Rothy signed with Dorothy Company, receiving direct training from Shin Seung-hun for four years before making her debut. On her atypical idol training, Rothy said, "I went to a song camp, learned dance, and learned guitar. I focused on vocal training, but there were two teachers. I also received personalized one-on-one guidance from CEO Shin Seung-hun. That would be the differentiating point."

=== 2017: "Stars" ===
Rothy released her first single "Stars" on November 9, 2017. "Stars" contains the story of a girl who is looking for her dream. Producer Shin Seung-hun said, "I'm trying to start Rothy with empathy. Knowing that she wants to sing songs that comfort her friends despite her age, she spent the last days of her teenage years looking for comfort and confidence in her self-identity and confusion." As a producer, he revealed his sincere wish, saying, "It's important to gain popularity, but I hope that people who sympathize with my song will find the reward as a musician."

After the release of the Face Live video for "Stars" through the M2 YouTube Channel, the single had a "chart reversal", ranking 3rd in real-time search terms on Melon, entered the Genie Music Top 100 and ranked 59th, and also rose 167 places from 368th to 194th on Melon, the highest ranking since its release.

Rothy was invited as a guest for Shin Seung-hun's year-end concert "2017 THE Shin Seung-hun SHOW-Winter Special" at the Olympic Hall in Olympic Park, Seoul for three days from December 15 to 17.

=== 2018: Shape of Rothy ===
On January 2, 2018, Rothy released "Baby Baby" with U-Kwon of Block B for the OST of Jugglers.

On June 1, Rothy released her second single "Sullae", with Yoo Seung-ho appearing in the music video for the single. Rothy, who turned 20, showed a more mature story of finding herself through the single.

On June 27, she released "A Little Bit More" with Jinho of Pentagon for the OST of What's Wrong with Secretary Kim. On July 8, Rothy released the song "Butterfly Effect" for the drama RE:Playlist. The track is a remake of Shin Seung-hun's "Butterfly Effect".

On August 30, Rothy released her first mini-album Shape of Rothy with the title track "Burning", a trendy up-tempo tropical house genre song, with a sophisticated melody that feels like a pop song, in addition to the sensuous lyrics that compare love to candlelight and fireflies. On September 7, she appeared on Yoo Hee-yeol's Sketchbook. On September 20, she appeared on M Countdown with "Stars", which was said to have reflected the listeners' requests.

On October 1, she released the track "Cloud" for the OST of The Beauty Inside. "Cloud" is a love song containing a shy heart that wants to hide the feelings that are blooming everywhere and is used in the first episode of the show.

=== 2019: "Blossom Flower", Color of Rothy ===
On January 30, 2019, Rothy released her third single "Blossom Flower", a song that compares an unknown flower and a bed abandoned on the roadside to the pain of parting. The track uses both acoustic guitar and an orchestra. The track peaked at 2nd on Genie and Olleh Music, 6th on Monkey3, 8th on Soribada, 14th on Naver Music, 20th on Bugs, 26th on Melon, and 30th on Mnet.

On February 10, she released "Rainbow" for the OST of Romance Is a Bonus Book. On February 11, Shin Seung-hun x Rothy's Tello brand sound "Fortune Teller" was released. On February 18, Rothy's official fandom name "Bloomimg" was announced. "Blooming", which means flowers are in full bloom, resembles Rothy and symbolizes people as beautiful as flowers, also containing the meaning of wishing Rothy and Blooming to always walk together along the path of flowers in full bloom.

On May 27, Rothy's second mini-album Color of Rothy was released with the title track "Bee". With Shape of Rothy representing a sketch, Color of Rothy represented color. This was Rothy's second song with a choreography after "Burning". Rothy said, "The title track, 'Bee', is a hip-hop R&B song that shows a very cute, chic, and bold side with lyrics that compare bees to flowers". On the B-side track "Beautiful Days", she said that "it's a song that I have a lot of affection for because it contains the story of my growth."

Rothy competed on King of Mask Singer as "Sweet Voice", becoming a runner-up after losing to Kyuhyun of Super Junior in the final round.

=== 2020–present: Singles ===
On July 4, 2020, Rothy released "Sleepless Night" for the OST of Backstreet Rookie. On August 13, she released her fourth digital single "Ocean View", featuring Chanyeol of Exo.

On June 9, 2021, she released "We Will Be Not All Together" for the OST of At a Distance, Spring Is Green with Han Seung-yoon. On October 14, Rothy released her fifth digital single "Cold Love". On November 21, she released "Our Road" for the OST of Jirisan.

On February 24, 2022, she released her sixth digital single "Believe". On March 12, she released "Something Precious" for the OST of Forecasting Love and Weather. On July 5, Rothy released her seventh digital single "Changed Number".

On May 31, 2023, she released her eighth digital single "Diamond". In August, Rothy released "Alive" for the soundtrack of Not Others. She is scheduled to release her single "Something Casual" on October 12.

== Artistry ==
Rothy had stated that she admires Jessie J, and that when she first saw Jessie J perform live, she fell in love at first sight with her charisma, singing, performance, stage manners, confidence, and enjoyment. She said that during middle school, while looking for performance videos, she had a heart that wants "to love music and enjoy music as an activity rather than a job."

Rothy has also referred to IU as a role model, saying that she wants to become a top artist like her, and as a solo female singer, someone can look at her and walk with her.

In Rothy's first profile, she said that her charm is her voice, because she has a voice that is the opposite of her appearance, which surprises people.

== Discography ==
=== Extended plays ===
List of extended plays, showing selected details, and selected chart positions
Title	Album details	Peak chart positions
Title	Album details	KOR
Shape of Rothy	Released: August 30, 2018; Label: Dorothy Company, Genie Music, Stone Music Entertainment; Formats: CD, digital download, streaming; Track listing: 1. Burning (버닝); 2. Lost Time (잃어버린 시간을 찾아서); 3. Stars; 4. Sullae (술래); 5. Lost Time (잃어버린 시간을 찾아서) (Inst.); 6. Burning (버닝) (Inst.)	—
Color of Rothy	Released: May 27, 2019; Label: Dorothy Company, Genie Music, Stone Music Entertainment; Formats: CD, digital download, streaming; Track listing: 1. Bee; 2. Beautiful Days (어제보다 자랐어); 3. Temperature (온도); 4. Blossom Flower (다 핀 꽃); 5. Bee (Inst.)	51
"—" denotes a recording that did not chart

=== Singles ===
List of singles, showing year released, selected chart positions, and name of the album
Title	Year	Peak chart positions	Album
Title	Year	KOR	Album
"Stars"	2017	—	Shape of Rothy
"Sullae" (술래)	2018	—	Shape of Rothy
"Burning" (버닝)	2018	—	Shape of Rothy
"Blossom Flower" (다 핀 꽃)	2019	89	Colors of Rothy
"Bee"	2019	108	Colors of Rothy
"Ocean View" featuring Chanyeol (Exo)	2020	97	Non-album singles
"Cold Love"	2021	162	Non-album singles
"Believe" (겨울..그다음 봄)	2022	136	Non-album singles
"Star" (이 별)	2022	—	Non-album singles
"Changed Number"	2022	—	Non-album singles
"Diamond"	2023	—	Non-album singles
"Rain Drive"	2023	—	Non-album singles
"Something Casual"	2023	—	Non-album singles
"No Where, Now Here" (너의 계절이 돌아올거야)	2023	—	Non-album singles
"Happy End"	2024	—	Non-album singles
"—" denotes a recording that did not chart

=== Soundtrack appearances ===
List of soundtrack singles, showing year released, selected chart positions, and name of the album
Title	Year	Peak chart positions	Album
Title	Year	KOR	Album
"Baby Baby" (애기애기해) with U-Kwon (Block B)	2018	—	Jugglers OST
"A Little Bit More" (조금만 더) with Jinho (Pentagon)	2018	—	What's Wrong with Secretary Kim OST
"Butterfly Effect" (나비효과)	2018	—	RE:Playlist OST
"Cloud" (구름)	2018	90	The Beauty Inside OST
"Rainbow" (레인보우)	2019	141	Romance Is a Bonus Book OST
"Hello"	2020	—	Ending Again OST
"Flower" (꽃은 따라서) (Prod. Rocoberry)	2020	—	Traveler - Argentina OST
"Sleepless Night" (잠이 오지 않는 밤에)	2020	—	Backstreet Rookie OST
"We Will Be Not All Together" (품) with Han Seung-yun	2021	—	At a Distance, Spring Is Green OST
"Our Road"	2021	—	Jirisan OST
"Something Precious" (사소중한 게 생겼나 봐)	2022	—	Forecasting Love and Weather OST
"Step By Step"	2022	—	Link: Eat, Love, Kill OST
"With You" (네 곁에)	2023	—	Mental Coach Jegal OST
"Alone" (홀로)	2023	—	Doctor Cha OST
"Alive"	2023	—	Not Others OST
"—" denotes a recording that did not chart

== Filmography ==
=== Film ===
Year	Title	Role	Notes	Ref.
2021	The Box		Cameo	

=== Television shows ===
Year	Title	Role	Notes	Ref.
2019	King of Mask Singer	Contestant	Runner-up; as "Sweet Voice" (Episodes 211–212)	
