= Junggigo =

South Korean singer (born 1980)

- 고정기
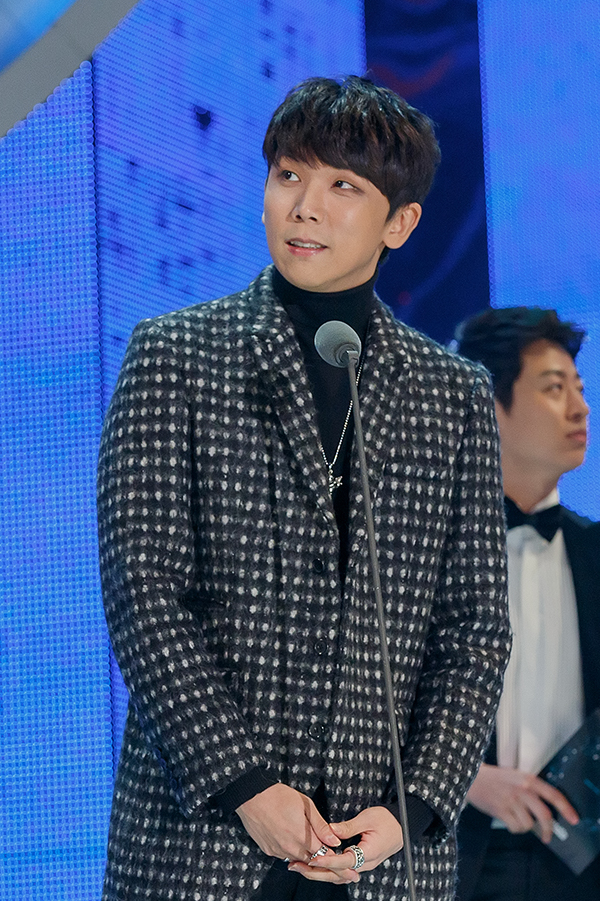
- Junggigo in November 2014.
- Born: Go Jung-gi; September 5, 1980 (age 45); Seoul, South Korea
- Occupation: Singer
- Musical career
- Genres: K-pop; R&B
- Instrument: Vocals
- Years active: 2002–present
- Label: Starship Entertainment
- Website: Official website

- Korean name
- Hangul: 고정기
- RR: Go Jeonggi
- MR: Ko Chŏnggi

Go Jung-gi (born September 5, 1980), better known by his stage name Junggigo, is a South Korean singer.

== Discography ==
=== Studio albums ===
Title	Album details	Peak chart positions	Sales
Title	Album details	KOR	Sales
Across the Universe	Released: April 20, 2017; Label: Starship Entertainment; Formats: CD, digital download; Track listing: 1. 1322 (Intro); 2. Across the Universe; 3. Fantasy; 4. 일주일 (247) (feat. Zion.T, Crush, Dean); 5. Hey Bae (feat. Paloalto); 6. Let Me Love You (Duet with Chanyeol of EXO); 7. Girls (feat. Sik-K); 8. Nocturne; 9. People Are Talking Noisily (Interlude); 10. UH-OH; 11. 1201 (Outro)	36	KOR: 538+

=== Tribute albums ===
Title	Album details	Peak chart positions	Sales
Title	Album details	KOR	Sales
Song For Chet	Collaborative album with Seungmin Han, Eunhye Oh, Dongha Shin & Juyoung Seo as "junggigo;quintet", in tribute to Chet Baker; Released: October 29, 2018; Label: visionary1 records; Formats: CD, Vinyl, digital download; Track listing: 1. It’s Always You; 2. You’re Mine, You; 3. I Fall In Love Too Easily; 4. I’ve Never Been In Love Before; 5. The Touch Of Your Lips; 6. My Finny Valentine; 7. But Not For Me; 8. I Wish You Love (LP Only)	—	—N/a

=== Extended plays ===
Title	Album details	Peak chart positions	Sales
Title	Album details	KOR	Sales
Pathfinder	Released: August 3, 2012; Label: J2 Entertainment; Formats: CD, digital download; Track listing: 1. Intro; 2. Yourbody (feat. Beenzino); 3. DLMN (Don't Leave Me Now!) (feat. DJ YTst); 4. 아무도 모르게 Nobody Knows Anything; 5. Waterfalls; 6. 그냥니생각이나 Just Thinking Of You; 7. Why?; 8. 아무도 모르게 Nobody Knows Anything (Instrumental); 9. Why? (Instrumental); 10. DLMN (Don't Leave Me Now!) (Remix)	23	KOR: 873
Junggigo Sings Brazil	Released: February 18, 2020; Label: Universal Music Group, Seoul Art Group Inc.; Formats: CD, digital download; Track listing: 1. How Insensitive; 2. Byebyebye; 3. Quando Quando Quando (feat. Kim Hyemi); 4. 샴푸의 요정 (Fairy of Shampoo) (Remastered))	—	—N/a

=== Singles as lead artist ===
Title	Year	Peak chart positions	Sales	Album
Title	Year	KOR	Sales	Album
"Byebyebye"	2008	No data	No data	Non-album singles
"NOWARNOCRY" feat. Nuck, Paloalto	2009	No data	No data	Non-album singles
"Blind"	2011	—	—N/a	Non-album singles
"Waterfalls"	2011	—	—N/a	Pathfinder
"Stay" (머물러요)	2011	—	—N/a	Non-album single
"Just Thinking Of You" (그냥 니 생각이 나)	2012	—	—N/a	Pathfinder
"Nobody Knows" (아무도 모르게)	2012	92	—N/a	Pathfinder
"Last in Love" (좋았나봐)	2013	69	KOR: 56,773	Non-album singles
"Want U" (너를 원해) feat. Beenzino	2014	1	KOR: 1,025,234	Non-album singles
"247" (일주일) feat. Crush, Zion.T, Dean	2015	14	KOR: 163,913	Across the Universe
"Nocturne"	2016	—	—N/a	Across the Universe
"Hey Bae" feat. Paloalto	2016	—	KOR: 15,166	Across the Universe
"Across The Universe"	2017	—	—N/a	Across the Universe
"Timeline" feat. Boi B, produced by Primary	2018	—	—N/a	Non-album singles
"Swish" feat. Soma	2018	—	—N/a	Non-album singles
"Sell My Heart" (상처팔이)	2019	—	—N/a	Non-album singles
"IWST" (말하자면) feat. Hoody, produced by Primary	2019	124	—N/a	Non-album singles
"Fairy of Shampoo" (샴푸의 요정)	2019	—	—N/a	Junggigo Sings Brazil
"Quando Quando Quando" (feat. Kim Hyemi)	2020	—	—N/a	Junggigo Sings Brazil
"EOY (Eyes On You)" feat. Jay Park	2020	—	—N/a	Non-album singles
"warm"	2020	—	—N/a	Non-album singles
"—" denotes release did not chart.

=== Collaborative singles ===
Title	Year	Peak chart positions	Sales	Album
Title	Year	KOR	Sales	Album
"Some" with Soyou feat. Lil Boi	2014	1	KOR: 2,533,652+	Non-album singles
"Love Is You" with Starship Entertainment artists	2014	10	KOR: 501,044	Starship Planet 2014
"Hieut" with Genius Nochang, Vasco, feat. NO.MERCY	2015	—	—N/a	No.Mercy Part.5
"Softly" (사르르) with Starship Entertainment artists	2015	24	KOR: 154,049	Starship Planet 2015
"Cook For Love" (요리 좀 해요) with K.Will, Brother Su, Jooyoung	2016	23	KOR: 55,712	Non-album singles
"Love Wishes" (누가 그래) with Starship Entertainment artists	2016	77	KOR: 48,485	Starship Planet 2016
"Love Is One More Than Farewell" with Soyou	2016	28	KOR: 56,621	Inkigayo Music Crush Part.3
"Days of Disturbance" (소란했던 시절에) with Giriboy	2016	—	KOR: 19,707	Vintage Box Vol.3
"Let Me Love You" with Chanyeol	2017	16	KOR: 117,194	Across the Universe
"Christmas Day" (크리스마스데이) with Starship Entertainment artists	2017	63	KOR: 49,521	Starship Planet 2017
"PAY DAY (Prod. GRAY)" with Changmo & Ash Island	2020	83	—N/a	Non-album singles
"Can We Break Up?" (헤어질 수 있을까) with Raina	2021	TBA	—N/a	MBN Miss Back Part.7
"—" denotes release did not chart.

=== Soundtrack appearances ===
Title	Year	Peak chart positions	Sales	Album
Title	Year	KOR	Sales	Album
"Waterfalls"	2011	—	—N/a	Spellbound OST
"Too Good" (with No Min-woo)	2014	—	—N/a	Hi! School: Love On OST
"Similar" (with Jooheon)	2015	—	—N/a	Mask OST
"Only You"	2016	40	KOR: 194,770	Uncontrollably Fond OST
"Slowly, Little By Little"	2016	—	—N/a	Sweet Stranger and Me OST
"Stunning"	2017	—	—N/a	Radiant Office OST
"Miss You in My Heart"	2017	—	—N/a	Queen for Seven Days OST
"D-Day"	2018	—	—N/a	Gangnam Beauty OST
"My All"	2019	—	—N/a	Secret Boutique OST
"Actually I Love You"	2024	—	—N/a	Doctor Slump OST
"—" denotes releases that did not chart or were not released in that region.

== Filmography ==
=== Music videos ===
Year	Music video	Album	Other artists
2008	"Byebyebye"	Non-album singles	—N/a
2011	"BLIND"	Non-album singles	—N/a
2011	"Waterfalls"	Non-album singles	—N/a
2012	"Just Thinking Of You"	Non-album singles	—N/a
2012	"Nobody Knows Anything"	pathfinder	—N/a
2014	"Want U"	Non-album single	—N/a
2015	"Hieut"	No Mercy Part 5	Genius Nochang, Vasco, feat. NO.MERCY
2015	"247"	Non-album singles	—
2016	"Nocturne"	Non-album singles	—
2016	"Hey Bae"	Non-album singles	Paloalto

== Awards and nominations ==
Year presented, name of the award ceremony, category, nominated work and the result of the nomination
Year	Award	Category	Nominated work	Result
2014	World Music Awards	World's Best Song	"Some (with Soyou)"	Nominated
2014	World Music Awards	World's Best Video	"Some (with Soyou)"	Nominated
2014	World Music Awards	World's Best Group	himself (with Soyou)	Nominated
2014	World Music Awards	World's Best Live Act	himself (with Soyou)	Nominated
2014	4th Gaon Chart K-Pop Awards	Artist of the Year – February	"Some (with Soyou)"	Won
2014	6th MelOn Music Awards	Hot Trend Award	"Some (with Soyou)"	Won
2014	6th MelOn Music Awards	Best R&B/Soul Award	"Some (with Soyou)"	Nominated
2014	6th MelOn Music Awards	Song of the Year	"Some (with Soyou)"	Nominated
2014	16th Mnet Asian Music Awards	Best Collaboration	"Some (with Soyou)"	Won
2014	16th Mnet Asian Music Awards	UnionPay Song of the Year	"Some (with Soyou)"	Nominated
2014	SBS Gayo Daejun Awards	Best Song	"Some (with Soyou)"	Won
2015	29th Golden Disk Awards	Digital Bonsang	"Some (with Soyou)"	Won
2015	29th Golden Disk Awards	Trend of the Year	"Some (with Soyou)"	Won
2015	24th Seoul Music Awards	Record of the Year in Digital Release	"Some (with Soyou)"	Won
2015	12th Korean Music Awards	Song of the Year	"Some (with Soyou)"	Won
2015	12th Korean Music Awards	Best Pop Song	"Some (with Soyou)"	Won
2015	12th Korean Music Awards	Group Musician of the Year	himself (with Soyou)	Nominated
