= Chanyeol =

South Korean rapper (born 1992)

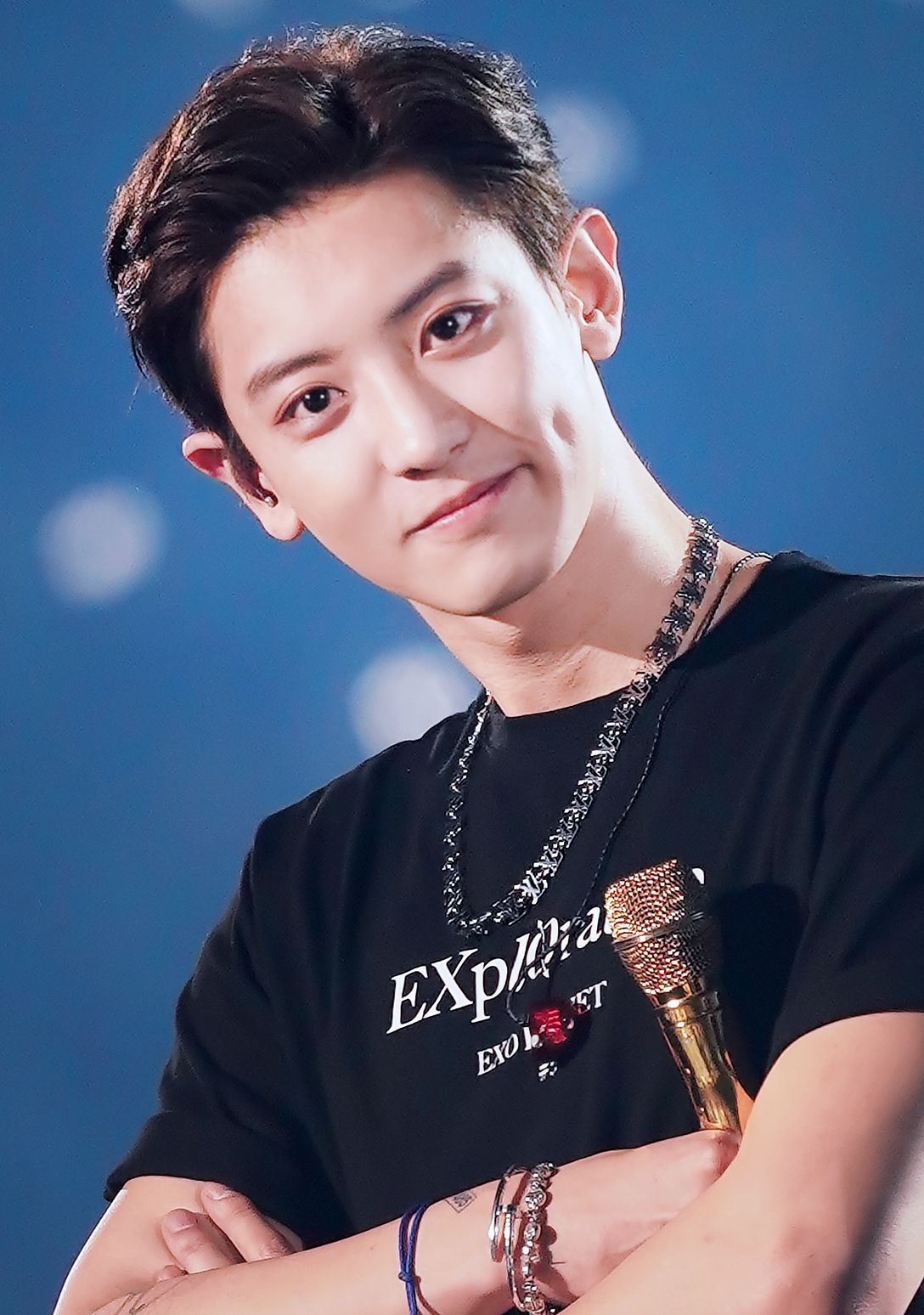
- Chanyeol in December 2019
- Born: Park Chan-yeol; November 27, 1992 (age 33); Seoul, South Korea
- Other name: Loey
- Education: Kyung Hee Cyber University; Inha University
- Occupations: Rapper; singer; songwriter; record producer; actor
- Musical career
- Genres: K-pop; hip hop; R&B
- Instrument: Vocals
- Years active: 2012–present
- Label: SM
- Member of: Exo; Exo-K; Exo-SC; SM Town
- Website: Official website

Korean name
- Hangul: 박찬열
- RR: Bak Chanyeol
- MR: Pak Ch'anyŏl

Signature
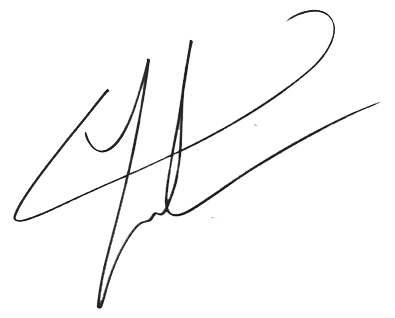

Park Chan-yeol (Korean: 박찬열; born November 27, 1992), better known mononymously as Chanyeol, is a South Korean rapper, singer, songwriter, producer, and actor. He is a member of the South Korean-Chinese boy group Exo, its sub-group Exo-K and sub-unit Exo-SC, and debuted as soloist on August 28, 2024, with his first extended play (EP) Black Out. Apart from his group's activities, Chanyeol has also starred in various television dramas and movies such as So I Married an Anti-fan (2016), and Secret Queen Makers (2018).

== Early life ==
Park Chan-yeol was born on November 27, 1992, in Yeokchon-dong, Eunpyeong District, Seoul, South Korea. He attended Hyundai High School in Apgujeong-dong, Seoul. He has an elder sister named Park Yoo-ra, who is a former announcer at South Korean broadcasting station YTN, and MBC. Chanyeol was admitted to a private acting institution when he was sixteen years old, where he became good friends with Block B's P.O.

After watching School of Rock in elementary school, Chanyeol became interested in music and soon began playing the drums. Chanyeol wanted to be a singer after listening to Unconditional Kismet by Yoo Young-jin.

Chanyeol has cited Jason Mraz and Eminem as his biggest influences, though he was a fan of rock bands like Muse, Green Day, Nirvana, and X Japan in middle school.

Chanyeol became a trainee under SM Entertainment after winning second place in the 2008 Smart Model Contest. While training under S.M., he began to turn his focus towards rapping. Prior to his debut, Chanyeol made cameo appearances in TVXQ's "HaHaHa Song" music video and Girls' Generation's "Genie" music video in 2008 and 2010 respectively.

== Career ==
=== 2012–14: Career beginnings ===
Chanyeol became the last Exo member to be officially introduced to the public on February 23, 2012. He possesses a baritone singing voice. The group official debuted on April 8 with the extended play Mama. He made a guest appearance in Girls' Generation-TTS's music video for their debut single "Twinkle". In October 2013, Chanyeol joined the cast of SBS' reality TV show Law of the Jungle during its filming in Micronesia. He also composed and recorded an original soundtrack titled "Last Hunter" for the show in 2015 after rejoining the show.

In 2014, Chanyeol wrote the rap for the Korean version of the track "Run" from Exo's second extended play Overdose and was featured in label-mates Henry's second extended play and Zhou Mi's debut EP. In May 2014, he became a regular cast member of the first season of SBS' reality TV show Roommate. He left the show in September 2014 due to schedule conflicts.

=== 2015–2021: Acting, songwriting and Exo-SC ===
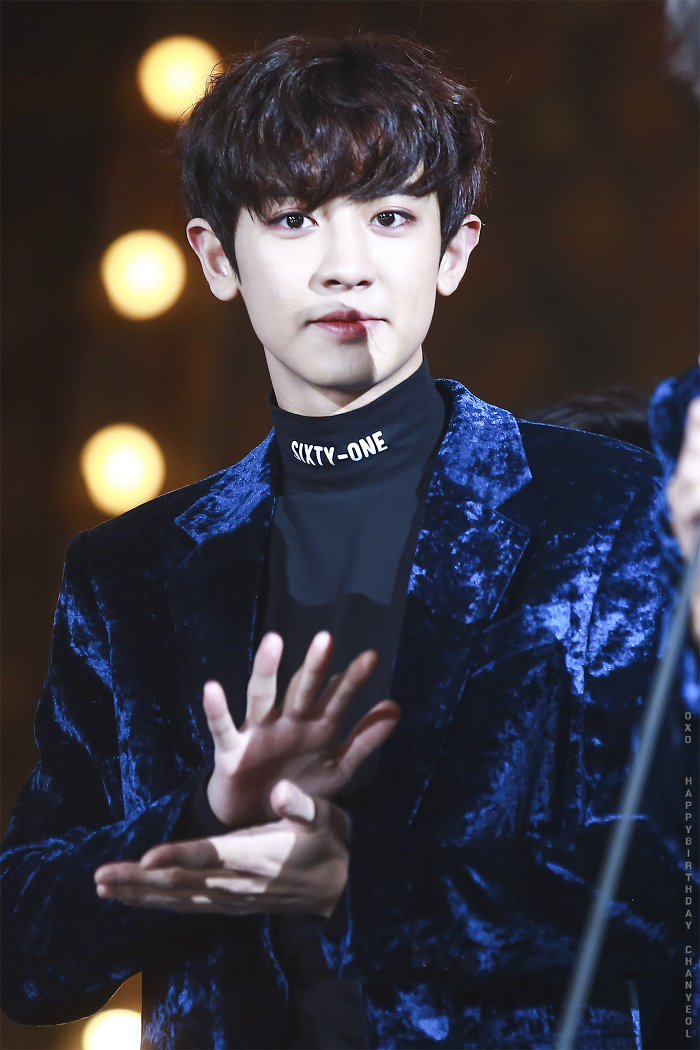
Chanyeol at 2016 Melon Music Awards

In April 2015, Chanyeol made his big screen debut with a supporting role in the South Korean film Salut d'Amour, which starred Park Geun-hyung and Youn Yuh-jung. He later starred as the male lead alongside actress Moon Ga-young and fellow Exo members in the web-drama Exo Next Door. In June 2015, Chanyeol, along with fellow Exo members Chen and Lay, co-wrote the Korean version of the track "Promise" from Love Me Right, the re-released version of Exo's second studio album. He later wrote the rap for "Lightsaber", Exo's promotional single for Star Wars: The Force Awakens, which was subsequently included in their third extended play Sing for You.

In April 2016, Chanyeol wrote and performed the rap for the song "Confession" from Yesung's debut extended play. In Exo's third studio album Ex'Act, which was released in May 2016, he co-wrote the lyrics for the track "Heaven". In June 2016, Chanyeol starred alongside Yuan Shanshan and label-mate Seohyun in the South Korean-Chinese film So I Married an Anti-fan. He and Yuan Shanshan also recorded a duet titled "I Hate You" as the theme song for the movie. In October 2016, Chanyeol and American R&B singer Tinashe were featured in American hip hop group Far East Movement and American electronic musician Marshmello's song "Freal Luv". In December 2016, Chanyeol and South Korean singer Punch collaborated on an original soundtrack titled "Stay With Me" for tvN's drama Guardian: The Lonely and Great God. The song reached number three on South Korea's Gaon Digital Chart.

In January 2017, Chanyeol played a supporting role in MBC's drama Missing 9. In February 2017, it was reported that he had allegedly registered himself as a music producer under the pen name "LOEY" with the Korea Music Copyright Association. Later in February, Chanyeol collaborated with South Korean singer Junggigo on a duet titled "Let Me Love You".

In May 2018, it was announced that Chanyeol would be playing the supporting role of Jung Se-joo, Hee-joo's younger brother in tvN's drama Memories of the Alhambra.

On September 14, 2018, Chanyeol with fellow Exo member Sehun released a collaborative single, "We Young", for SM Station X 0.

On April 25, 2019, he released his first solo song "SSFW" through SM Station. On June 28, it was confirmed that Chanyeol along with his fellow Exo member Sehun would debut as the group's second official sub-unit Exo-SC, and they released their first EP What a Life on July 22, 2019.

In 2021, he appeared in musical road film The Box, a jukebox musical containing familiar popular songs from world music as Coldplay, Billie Eilish, and Pharrell Williams in the backdrop of South Korean locales.

=== 2024–present: Solo debut and continued acting activities ===
On October 20, 2023, Chanyeol released digital single "Good Enough", his first solo song since "Tomorrow" in April 2021.

On February 7, 2024, it was reported that Chanyeol joined the Netflix series' The Frog which will be released on August 23.

On July 27, SM announced that Chanyeol would debut as a soloist in August 2024, and he would embark on his first solo concert titled "2024 Chanyeol Live Tour: City-scape", starting in Seoul on September 6 and 7. Chanyeol released his debut EP Black Out on August 28, 2024, along with the single of the same name.

== Personal life ==
Along with fellow Exo members Suho and Baekhyun, Chanyeol attended Kyung Hee Cyber University and took online classes for Culture and Arts Department of Business Administration. Prior to his enlistment, Chanyeol took graduate studies at Inha University for interior design.

Chanyeol enlisted into the military as an active duty soldier on March 29, 2021. He was officially discharged on September 28, 2022.

== Discography ==
=== Extended plays ===
List of albums, showing selected details, selected chart positions, sales figures, and certifications
Title	Details	Peak chart positions		Sales	Certifications
Title	Details	KOR	JPN	Sales	Certifications
Black Out	Released: August 28, 2024; Label: SM Entertainment; Formats: CD, digital download, streaming	3	16	KOR: 415,990; JPN: 3,309	KMCA: Platinum
Upside Down	Released: August 25, 2025; Label: SM Entertainment; Formats: CD, digital download, streaming	4	33	KOR: 270,896; JPN: 1,508	
Hibi (日々)	Released: October 22, 2025; Label: SM Entertainment; Formats: CD, digital download, streaming	—	12	JPN: 8,261	
Tabi (旅)	Released: October 2, 2026; Label: SM Entertainment; Formats: CD, digital download, streaming	—	17	JPN: 5,534	

=== Korean singles ===
==== As lead artist ====
List of singles, showing year released, selected chart positions, sales figures, and name of the album
Title	Year	Peak chart positions		Sales (DL)	Album
Title	Year	KOR	US World	Sales (DL)	Album
"Delight"	2014	—	—	KOR: 12,096	Exology Chapter 1: The Lost Planet
"Youngstreet"	2015	—	—	—N/a	Lee Gook Joo's Young Street Logo Song
"SSFW" (봄 여름 가을 겨울)	2019	174	—	—N/a	Non-album single
"Tomorrow"	2021	— (Note: Did not enter Gaon Digital Chart but peaked at number 92 on Gaon Download Chart)	9	—N/a	SM Station Season 4
"Good Enough"	2023	— (Note: Did not enter Circle Digital Chart but peaked at number 110 on Circle Download Chart)	8	—N/a	Non-album single
"Black Out"	2024	— (Note: "Black Out" did not enter the Circle Digital Chart, but peaked at number 26 and 78 on the Circle Download Chart and the Circle BGM Chart, respectively.)	—	—N/a	Black Out
"Upside Down"	2025	— (Note: Did not enter Circle Digital Chart but peaked at number 28 on Circle Download Chart)	—	—N/a	Upside Down

=== Japanese singles ===
==== Singles ====
Title	Year	Album
"ずるいよ" (Zuruiyo)	2025	Hibi (日々)
"Song For You"	2026	旅

==== As featured artist ====
List of singles as featured artist, showing year released, selected chart positions, sales figures, and name of the album
Title	Year	Peak chart positions			Sales (DL)	Album
Title	Year	KOR	KOR Hot	US World	Sales (DL)	Album
"Bad Girl" (Henry feat. Chanyeol)	2014	75	—N/a	—	KOR: 27,192	Fantastic
"Rewind" (Zhou Mi feat. Chanyeol)	2014	—	—N/a	6	—N/a	Rewind
"Don't Make Money" (Heize feat. Chanyeol)	2015	43	—N/a	—	KOR: 60,192	Unpretty Rapstar 2 Semi-final Part 1
"Confession" (Yesung feat. Chanyeol)	2016	133	—N/a	—	KOR: 21,890	Here I Am
"Freal Luv" (Far East Movement and Marshmello feat. Chanyeol and Tinashe)	2016	— (Note: "Freal Luv" charted at number six on the Gaon International Digital Chart.)	—N/a	—	KOR: 22,665	Identity
"Anbu" (Lee Sun-hee feat. Chanyeol)	2020	58	85	—	—N/a	Non-album singles
"Ocean View" (Rothy feat. Chanyeol)	2020	97	78	—	—N/a	Non-album singles
"Faded" (Devine Channel feat. Loopy and Chanyeol)	2020	—	—	—	—N/a	Byproduct
"—" denotes a recording that did not chart or was not released in that territory Notes: Billboard Korea K-Pop Hot 100 was introduced in August 2011 and discontinued in July 2014

==== Collaborations ====
List of collaborations, showing year released, selected chart positions, sales figures, and name of the album
Title	Year	Peak chart positions			Sales (DL)	Album
Title	Year	KOR	KOR Hot	US World	Sales (DL)	Album
"If We Love Again" (with Chen)	2016	38	—N/a	—	KOR: 47,208	Two Yoo Project Sugar Man Part 32
"Let Me Love You" (with Junggigo)	2017	16	—N/a	—	KOR: 117,194	Across the Universe
"We Young" (with Sehun)	2018	72	71	3	—N/a	Station X 0
"Yours" (with Raiden feat.Lee Hi, Changmo)	2020	49	53	8	—N/a	Non-album singles
"GBGN" (with Zhou Mi)	2024	—	—	—	—N/a	Non-album singles
"—" denotes a recording that did not chart or was not released in that territory Notes: Billboard Korea K-Pop Hot 100 was introduced in August 2011 and discontinued in July 2014

=== Soundtrack appearances ===
List of soundtracks, showing year released, selected chart positions, sales figures, and name of the album
Title	Year	Peak chart positions				Sales (DL)	Album
Title	Year	KOR	KOR Hot	MLY	US World	Sales (DL)	Album
"Last Hunter"	2016	—	—N/a	—	—	—N/a	Law of the Jungle OST
"I Hate You" (with Yuan Shanshan)	2016	—	—N/a	—	—	—N/a	So I Married an Anti-fan OST
"Stay with Me" (with Punch)	2016	3	83	12	3	KOR: 2,500,000	Guardian: The Lonely and Great God OST
"Go Away Go Away" (with Punch)	2020	73	63	—	21	—N/a	Dr. Romantic 2 OST
"Minimal Warm"	2020	—	—	—	—	—N/a	She's My Type OST
"Break Your Box"	2021	—	—	—	—	—N/a	The Box OST
"Bad Guy"	2021	—	—	—	—	—N/a	The Box OST
"Without You"	2021	—	—	—	—	—N/a	The Box OST
"Happy" (with Aancod)	2021	—	—	—	—	—N/a	The Box OST
"My Funny Valentine"	2021	—	—	—	—	—N/a	The Box OST
"What a Wonderful World" (with Kim Jihyun)	2021	—	—	—	—	—N/a	The Box OST
"Raining"	2021	—	—	—	—	—N/a	The Box OST
"Everyday With You"	2021	—	—	—	—	—N/a	The Box OST
"A Sky Full of Stars"	2021	—	—	—	—	—N/a	The Box OST
"—" denotes a recording that did not chart or was not released in that territory Notes: Billboard Korea K-Pop Hot 100 was introduced in August 2011 and discontinued in July 2014

=== Other charted songs ===
List of other charted songs, showing year released, selected chart positions, and name of the album
Title	Year	Peak chart positions	Album
Title	Year	KOR Down.	Album
"Hasta La Vista"	2024	107	Black Out
"Ease Up"	2024	111	Black Out
"Back Again"	2024	110	Black Out
"I'm on Your Side Too"	2024	108	Black Out
"Clover"	2024	113	Black Out

=== Songwriting credits ===
All credits are adapted from the Korea Music Copyright Association, unless stated otherwise.

Year	Artist(s)	Song	Album	Lyrics (Note: Chanyeol was credited as Loey for the lyrics writing of Exo-SC tracks)		Music (Note: Chanyeol was credited as Loey for composing Exo-SC tracks)		Arrangement (Note: Chanyeol was credited as Loey for the arrangement of Exo-SC tracks)	
Year	Artist(s)	Song	Album	Credited	With	Credited	With	Credited	With
2014	Exo	"Run"	Overdose	Yes	Seo Ji-eum	No	—N/a	No	—N/a
2015	Exo	"Promise" (Korean and Chinese versions)	Love Me Right	Yes	Chen, Lay	No	—N/a	No	—N/a
2015	Chanyeol	"Young Street"	Lee Gook Joo's Young Street	Yes	—N/a	Yes	—N/a	Yes	—N/a
2015	Chanyeol	"Last Hunter"	Law of the Jungle in Brunei	Yes	—N/a	Yes	—N/a	Yes	—N/a
2015	Heize	"Don't Make Money" (feat. Chanyeol)	Unpretty Rapstar 2 Semi-final Part 1	Yes	Heize, DM, Sleepwell	No	—N/a	No	—N/a
2015	Exo	"Lightsaber"	Sing For You	Yes	MQ, Jung Ju-hee	No	—N/a	No	—N/a
2016	Exo	"Heaven"	Ex'AcT	Yes	Min Yeon-jae	No	—N/a	No	—N/a
2016	Far East Movement	"Freal Luv" (with Marshmello feat. Tinashe & Chanyeol)	Identity	Yes	Nishimura, Coquia Roh, Chris Comstock, William Phillips, Tinashe Kachingwe	No	—N/a	No	—N/a
2017	Exo	"Ko Ko Bop"	The War	Yes	Chen, Baekhyun, JQ, Hyun Ji-won	No	—N/a	No	—N/a
2017	Exo	"Chill" (소름)	The War	Yes	Seo Ji-eum	No	—N/a	No	—N/a
2017	Exo	"Sweet Lies"	The Power of Music	Yes	G.Soul	No	—N/a	No	—N/a
2017	Exo	"Together" (같이해)	Exo Planet 3 – The Exo'rdium (dot)	Yes	MQ	No	—N/a	No	—N/a
2018	Chanyeol	"Give Me That"	Non-album single	Yes	Studio 519 (MQ, Jung Yong Jun, yunji), Woozi	Yes	Studio 519 (MQ, Jung Yong Jun, yunji), Woozi	Yes	Studio 519 (MQ, Jung Yong Jun, yunji), Woozi
2018	Chanyeol	"Hand"	Non-album single	Yes	—N/a	Yes	—N/a	Yes	—N/a
2018	Exo	"Gravity"	Don't Mess Up My Tempo	Yes	Kim Min-jung	No	—N/a	No	—N/a
2018	Exo	"With You" (가끔)	Don't Mess Up My Tempo	Yes	Kim Min-ji	No	—N/a	No	—N/a
2018	Exo	"Love Shot"	Love Shot	Yes	Jo Yoon-kyung, Chen	No	—N/a	No	—N/a
2018	Exo	"Trauma"	Love Shot	Yes	Jo Yoon-kyung	No	—N/a	No	—N/a
2019	Exo-SC	"What a Life"	What a Life	Yes	Gaeko, Sehun	No	Gaeko, Devine-Channel, Aris Maggiani	No	Devine-Channel, Aris Maggiani
2019	Exo-SC	"Just Us 2" (있어 희미하게) (feat. Gaeko)	What a Life	Yes	Boi B, Sehun	No	Gaeko, GRAY, DAX	No	GRAY, DAX
2019	Exo-SC	"Closer to You" (부르면 돼)	What a Life	Yes	Gaeko, Hangzoo, Sehun	No	Gaeko, Devine-Channel	No	Devine-Channel
2019	Exo-SC	"Borderline" (선)	What a Life	Yes	Gaeko, Sehun	No	Gaeko, Devine-Channel, Mike Dupree	No	Devine-Channel, Mike Dupree
2019	Exo-SC	"Roller Coaster" (롤러코스터)	What a Life	Yes	Studio 519 (MQ, Jung Yong Jun, yunji), Sehun, Gaeko	Yes	Studio 519 (MQ, Jung Yong Jun, yunji), Sehun, Gaeko	Yes	Studio 519 (MQ, Jung Yong Jun, yunji), Sehun, Gaeko
2019	Exo-SC	"Daydreamin'" (夢)	What a Life	Yes	Studio 519 (MQ, Jung Yong Jun, yunji), Sehun	Yes	Studio 519 (MQ, Jung Yong Jun, yunji), Sehun	Yes	Studio 519 (MQ, Jung Yong Jun, yunji), Sehun
2019	Kai	"Confession"	Non-album single	Yes	Kai, Danke, Dominique Logan, Darious Logan	No	—N/a	No	—N/a
2019	Loey, MQ	"Familiar"	Non-album single	Yes	Studio 519 (MQ, Jung Yong Jun, yunji)	Yes	Studio 519 (MQ, Jung Yong Jun, yunji)	Yes	Studio 519 (MQ, Jung Yong Jun, yunji)
2020	Loey, MQ	"Slow Walk"	Non-album single	Yes	Studio 519 (MQ, Jung Yong Jun, yunji)	Yes	Studio 519 (MQ, Jung Yong Jun, yunji)	Yes	Studio 519 (MQ, Jung Yong Jun, yunji)
2020	Lee Sun-hee	"안부" (feat. Chanyeol)	안부	Yes	Lee Sun-hee	No	—N/a	No	—N/a
2020	Exo-SC	"1 Billion Views" (10억뷰) (feat. Moon)	1 Billion Views	Yes	Gaeko, Boi B, Oh Sehun	No	—N/a	No	—N/a
2020	Exo-SC	"Say It" (feat. Penomeco)	1 Billion Views	Yes	Gaeko, Thama, Sehun, Penomeco	No	—N/a	No	—N/a
2020	Exo-SC	"Rodeo Station" (로데오역)	1 Billion Views	Yes	Gaeko, Boi B, Sehun	No	—N/a	No	—N/a
2020	Exo-SC	"Telephone" (척) (feat. 10cm)	1 Billion Views	Yes	Gaeko, Studio 519 (MQ, Jung Yong Jun, yunji), Sehun	Yes	Gaeko, Studio 519 (MQ, Jung Yong Jun, yunji), Sehun	Yes	Studio 519 (MQ, Jung Yong Jun, yunji)
2020	Exo-SC	"Jet Lag" (시차적응)	1 Billion Views	Yes	Gaeko, Hangzoo, Sehun	No	—N/a	No	—N/a
2020	Exo-SC	"Fly Away" (날개) (feat. Gaeko)	1 Billion Views	Yes	Gaeko, Studio 519 (MQ, Jung Yong Jun, yunji), Sehun	Yes	Gaeko, Studio 519 (MQ, Jung Yong Jun, yunji), Sehun	Yes	Studio 519 (MQ, Jung Yong Jun, yunji)
2020	Exo-SC	"Nothin'"	1 Billion Views	Yes	Gaeko	Yes	Nellz, Will Yanez, Mike Molina, John Mitchell, Xplicit	No	—N/a
2020	Exo-SC	"On Me"	1 Billion Views	Yes	Gaeko, Studio 519 (MQ, Jung Yong Jun, yunji), Sehun	Yes	Gaeko, Studio 519 (MQ, Jung Yong Jun, yunji), Sehun	Yes	IMLAY, Studio 519 (MQ, Jung Yong Jun, yunji)
2020	Devine Channel	"Faded" (feat. Loopy and Chanyeol)	Byproduct	Yes	Loopy	Yes	Devine Channel, Loopy	No	—N/a
2021	Chanyeol	"Break Your Box"	The Box OST	Yes	—N/a	No	—N/a	No	—N/a
2021	Chanyeol	"Tomorrow"	Non-album single	Yes	JQ, Makeumine Works	No	—N/a	No	—N/a
2021	Onestar, Lee Hyuk	"Prayer" (기도)	Votiz project Vol. 2	Yes	Lim Han Byul, Jjanggu	No	—N/a	No	—N/a
2023	Exo	"Regret It"	Exist	Yes	Jang Sang-min	No	—N/a	No	—N/a
2023	Chanyeol	"Good Enough"	Non-album single	Yes	—N/a	No	—N/a	No	—N/a

== Filmography ==
=== Films ===
Year	Title	Role	Notes	Ref.
2015	Salut d'Amour	Min-sung	Supporting role	
2016	So I Married an Anti-fan	Hoo Joon	Main role	
2020	My Heart is Pounding	Bae Gu-soo	Audio cinema, main role	
2021	The Box	Ji Hoon	Lead role	

=== Television series ===
Year	Title	Role	Notes
2008	High Kick!	High school student	Extra; episode 71
2012	To the Beautiful You	Himself	Cameo; episode 2
2013	Royal Villa	Himself	
2015	Exo Next Door	Himself	
2017	Missing 9	Lee Yeol	
2018	Memories of the Alhambra	Jung Se-joo	
2018	Secret Queen Makers	Himself	
2024	The Frog	Koo Gi-ho	

=== Television shows ===
Year	Title	Role	Notes
2014	Law of the Jungle	Recurring cast	Episodes 90–94
2014	Roommate	Main cast	Season 1
2015	Law of the Jungle	Recurring cast	Episodes 175–177
2017	Master Key	Recurring cast	Episode 4
2018	Salty Tour	Recurring cast	Episodes 25–30
2021	Law of the Jungle in Ulleungdo & Dokdo	Recurring cast	Episodes 432–433

=== Music videos ===
Year	Title	Ref.
2013	"1-4-3 (I Love You)" (Acoustic version; Henry Lau featuring Chanyeol)	
2014	"Rewind" (Zhou Mi featuring Chanyeol)	
2016	"I Hate You" (with Yuan Shanshan)	
2016	"Freal Luv" (Far East Movement & Marshmello featuring Chanyeol & Tinashe)	
2016	"Stay With Me" (with Punch)	
2018	"We Young" (with Sehun)	
2019	"SSFW (봄 여름 가을 겨울)"	
2020	"Yours" (with Raiden) (featuring Lee Hi, Changmo)	
2020	"Nothin'"	
2021	"Break Your Box"	
2021	"Without You"	
2021	"Raining"	
Guest appearances
2014	"빛" (remake; H.O.T.)	

== Theater ==
Year	English title	Korean title	Role	Notes	Ref.
2021	The Meisa's Song	메이사의 노래	Raman	Military musical	

== Concerts ==
Date	Title	City	Country	Venue	Attendance	Ref.
September 6–7, 2024	2024 Chanyeol Live Tour: City-scapes	Seoul	South Korea	Bluesquare Master Hall	TBA	
September 28, 2024	2024 Chanyeol Live Tour: City-scapes	Ho Chi Minh	Vietnam	Military Zone 7 Indoor Sports Complex	TBA	
October 19, 2024	2024 Chanyeol Live Tour: City-scapes	Quezon (Note: Promoted as Manila.)	Philippines	Araneta Coliseum	TBA	
October 26, 2024	2024 Chanyeol Live Tour: City-scapes	Bangkok	Thailand	Thunder Dome	TBA	
November 13–14, 2024	2024 Chanyeol Live Tour: City-scapes	Tokyo	Japan	Tachikawa Stage Garden	TBA	
November 20–21, 2024	2024 Chanyeol Live Tour: City-scapes	Fukuoka	Japan	Fukuoka Sunplace Hotel & Hall	TBA	
November 26–27	2024 Chanyeol Live Tour: City-scapes	Osaka	Japan	Osaka International Convention Center	TBA	
December 3–4, 2024	2024 Chanyeol Live Tour: City-scapes	Nagoya	Japan	Aichi Prefectural Act Theater Main Theater	TBA	
December 7, 2024	2024 Chanyeol Live Tour: City-scapes	Jakarta	Indonesia	Beach City International Stadium	TBA	
December 21, 2024	2024 Chanyeol Live Tour: City-scapes	Hong Kong		AsiaWorld-Expo Hall 10	TBA	
December 28, 2024	2024 Chanyeol Live Tour: City-scapes	Kaohsiung	Taiwan	Kaohsiung Music Center		
February 15–16, 2025	2024 Chanyeol Live Tour: City-scapes	Seoul	South Korea	KBS Arena		

== Ambassadorship ==
Year	Title	Ref.
2019	Muse for Acqua Di Parma	
2020	Nacific Brand Ambassador	
2020	Prada Brand Ambassador	

== Awards and nominations ==
Name of the award ceremony, year presented, category, nominee of the award, and the result of the nomination
Award ceremony	Year	Category	Nominee / Work	Result	Ref.
Asia Model Awards	2017	Asia OST Popularity (with Punch)	"Stay With Me" (with Punch)	Won	
KKBox Music Awards (Note: The KKBox Music Awards is an annual music ceremony organised by Taiwan-based music streaming service KKBox. Every year KKBox tabulates the streaming statistics from their subscribers and identifies the 10 artists that are most popular to be awarded the coveted "Artist of the Year" awards amongst others.)	2018	Best Korean Single of the Year	"Stay With Me" (with Punch)	Won	
Korea Drama Awards	2015	Best New Actor	Chanyeol	Won	
Korea Drama Awards	2015	Hallyu Star Award	Chanyeol	Won	
Melon Music Awards	2017	Top 10 Artist	Chanyeol	Nominated	
Mnet Asian Music Awards	2017	Best OST	"Stay With Me" (with Punch)	Nominated	
Tencent Music Entertainment Awards	2019	Most Popular Overseas Singer	Chanyeol	Won	
Top Chinese Music Awards	2016	Most Popular Foreign Idol	Chanyeol	Won	
YinYueTai VChart Awards	2017	Best Collaboration	"I Hate You" (with Yuan Shanshan)	Won	
YinYueTai VChart Awards	2017	Most Popular Artist (South Korea)	Chanyeol	Won	
