= Stay with Me (Chanyeol and Punch song) =

Single by Chanyeol and Punch

from the album Guardian (Original Television Soundtrack), Pt. 1
- Released: December 3, 2016
- Recorded: 2016
- Genre: Soundtrack; K-ballad
- Length: 3:13
- Label: CJ E&M
- Composer: Rocoberry
- Lyricist: Lee Seung-joo
- Producer: Rocoberry

Chanyeol singles chronology
"I Hate You" (2016)	"Stay with Me" (2016)	"Let Me Love You" (2017)

Punch singles chronology
"Say Yes" (2016)	"Stay with Me" (2016)	"When My Loneliness Calls You" (2017)

Music video
- "Stay with Me" on YouTube

"Stay with Me" is a song recorded by South Korean rapper Chanyeol of South Korean-Chinese boy group Exo and South Korean singer Punch, serving as part of the original soundtrack of the 2016 hit television drama Guardian: The Lonely and Great God. The song was written by Lee Seung-joo and composed by the musical duo Rocoberry. The single was released on December 3 and was part 1 in a series composed of high-charting singles.

== Background and release ==
On December 1, it was announced that Punch and Chanyeol would be releasing a single for the South Korean cable television series Guardian: The Lonely and Great God. The single was composed and arranged by the South Korean indie band Rocoberry while the lyrics were written by Lee Seung-joo. Rocoberry is a musical duo that consists of members Roco (vocalist, lyricist) and Conan (chorus, composer, lyricist). Rocoberry had previously worked on the OSTs for the hit dramas Descendants of the Sun ("Everytime") and Pinocchio ("Love Is Like Snow"). "Stay with Me" was officially released for digital download on December 3, 2016.

== Music video ==
The music video was released on December 3, 2016. It features Punch and Chanyeol singing the song in the recording studio and is interspersed with scenes from the drama. The music video hit one million views in 24 hours.

The music video was the third most watched Korean music video in December 2016, and the fifth most watched for the first half of 2017. "Stay with Me" became the most watched Korean OST music video of all-time.

As of October 2022, the video has accumulated over 400 million views, making it the most-viewed music video for an original soundtrack. It is also Chanyeol and Punch's first music video to surpass the 100 million views milestone. On May 4, 2018, the video reached 1 million likes on YouTube, becoming the first and only Korean drama original soundtrack to reach that milestone, and currently has more than 4.3 million likes.

== Chart performance ==
"Stay with Me" debuted at #1 on Mnet, #2 on Genie and #10 on Melon. Shortly after its release, Chanyeol ranked #1 and the OST #2 on the Melon Real Time Chart. Additionally, "Stay with Me" ranked #3 on Billboard's US World Digital Songs and #5 on Spotify's Global Viral 50 Chart. On January 11, 2017, the song achieved 100,000 likes on Melon. On February 13, Chanyeol was nominated for Melon Top 10 Artist Award for his performance in "Stay with Me". He also won Melon's Weekly Popularity Award for four weeks in a row.

By March 2, "Stay with Me" had accumulated 1,042,951 downloads on the Gaon Music Chart. It is the first Goblin OST to surpass 1 million downloads. On July 7 Gaon published the Half-Year Charts. "Stay with Me" ranked in the Top 10 of the Digital, Download and Streaming charts.

On September 12, 2018, the Gaon Music Chart announced that "Stay with Me" had surpassed the 1 million streaming milestone during the period between February 4 and 10, 2018.

== Charts ==
=== Weekly charts ===
Chart (2016)	Peak position
Malaysia (RIM)	9
Philippines (Philippine Hot 100)	9
South Korea (Gaon)	3
US World Digital Songs (Billboard)	3

=== Monthly charts ===
Chart (2016)	Peak position
South Korea (Gaon)	2

=== Yearly charts ===
Chart (2017)	Peak position
South Korea (Gaon)	31

== Sales ==
Region	Sales
South Korean (Gaon)	2,500,000

=== Streaming ===
Chart	Streaming
South Korean Gaon Streaming Chart	100,000,000+

== Accolades and nominations ==
Year	Award-giving body	Category	Result
2017	Asia Model Awards	Asia OST Popularity	Won
2017	19th Mnet Asian Music Awards	Best OST	Nominated
2018	13th KKBox Music Awards	Best Korean Single of the Year	Won

== Release history ==
Region	Date	Format	Label
Various	December 3, 2016	Digital download; streaming	CJ E&M
