= Punch (singer) =

South Korean singer

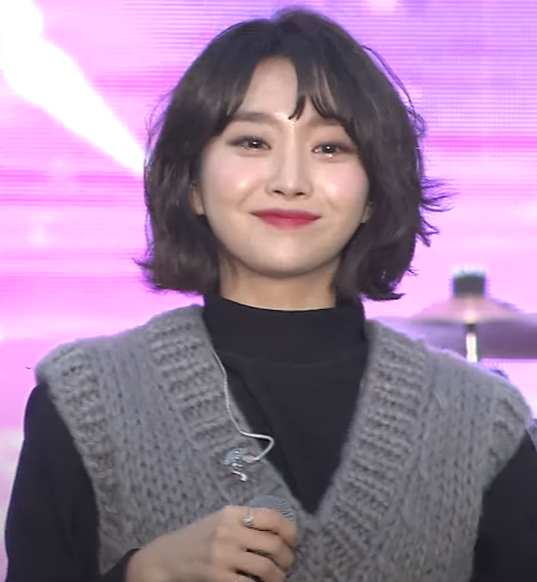
- Punch in 2018

Background information
- Born: Bae Jin-young; February 19, 1993 (age 33); Seoul, South Korea
- Genres: R&B; K-pop
- Occupation: Singer
- Instrument: Vocals
- Years active: 2014–present
- Labels: YamYam; Stone Music
- Website: yamyament.com

Korean name
- Hangul: 배진영
- RR: Bae Jinyeong
- MR: Pae Chinyŏng

Bae Jin-young (Korean: 배진영; born February 19, 1993), better known by her stage name Punch (펀치), is a South Korean singer. She is best known for her original soundtracks for various TV series, notably "Sleepless Night" for It's Okay, That's Love (2014), "Everytime" for Descendants of the Sun (2016) with Exo member Chen and "Stay with Me" for Guardian: The Lonely and Great God (2016) and "Go Away Go Away" for Dr. Romantic 2 (2020) with Exo member Chanyeol.

== Discography ==
=== Extended plays ===
Title	EP details	Peak chart positions
Title	EP details	KOR
Dream of You	Released: January 16, 2019; Label: YamYam Entertainment; Formats: CD, digital download; Track listing: 1. "Heart" (이 마음); 2. "Like a Snowflower" (눈꽃처럼); 3. "Love Is You"; 4. "Kiss Me"; 5. "End of the Night" (이 밤의 끝)	72
Full Bloom	Released: March 10, 2021; Label: YamYam Entertainment; Formats: CD, digital download; Track listing: 1. "Wind" (나의 바람); 2. "My Everything" (안녕 내 전부였던 너); 3. "I'm Jealous" (질투나) (feat. Real.be); 4. "Remember" (사라진 기억); 5. "Not" (아니); 6. "Wind" (나의 바람) (Inst.); 7. "My Everything" (안녕 내 전부였던 너) (Inst.); 8. "I'm Jealous" (질투나) (Inst.); 9. "Remember" (사라진 기억) (Inst.); 10. "Not" (아니) (Inst.)	94

=== Singles ===
Title	Year	Peak chart positions				Sales (DL)	Album
Title	Year	KOR Circle	KOR Hot	MAL	US World	Sales (DL)	Album
Singles
"When Night Is Falling" (밤이 되니까)	2017	8	38	—	—	KOR: 2,500,000+	Non-album singles
"Tonight" (오늘밤도)	2018	28	29	—	—	—N/a	Non-album singles
"End of the Night" (이 밤의 끝)	2018	29	34	—	—	—N/a	Non-album singles
"Good Bye" (헤어지는 중)	2018	2	4	—	—	—N/a	Non-album singles
"Heart" (이 마음)	2019	83	84	—	—	—N/a	Dream of You
"Love Me" (럽미)	2019	81	75	—	—	—N/a	Non-album singles
"Sometimes" (가끔 이러다)	2019	5	10	—	—	—N/a	Non-album singles
"Yesterday" (그때의 우리)	2019	61	53	—	—	—N/a	Non-album singles
"Say Hello" (안부)	2020	128	—	—	—	—N/a	Non-album singles
"Say Yes" (featuring Moonbyul)	2020	193	—	—	—	—N/a	Non-album singles
"My Everything" (안녕 내 전부였던 너)	2021	118	—	—	—	—N/a	Full Bloom
"We're Breaking Up" (헤어지는거죠)	2021	110	—	—	—	—N/a	Non-album singles
"The Love"	2022	139	—	—	—	—N/a	Non-album singles
"Losing Sleep Over You" (맞아 잠을 설친 건 너 때문이야)	2022	104	—	—	—	—N/a	Non-album singles
"Memory" (이 밤이 가면 그대 올까요)	2022	127	—	—	—	—N/a	Non-album singles
Collaborations
"Hurts" (아프다니까) (with The One)	2014	28	—	—	—	KOR: 96,114	Non-album singles
"Drink with Me Now" (지금 술 한잔 했어) (with Kim Bo-kyung)	2014	32	21	—	—	KOR: 190,292	Non-album singles
"How Are You" (잘 지내고 있니) (with Yoon Mi-rae)	2016	16	—	—	—	KOR: 137,534	Non-album singles
"I Miss You" (보고 싶단 말이야) (with Mad Clown)	2021	97	—	—	—	—N/a	Non-album singles
"Way" (with Onew)	2021	127	—	—	—	—N/a	SM Station Season 4
"White Christmas" (크리스마스에는) (with Lee Bo-ram and Yebin)	2022	194	—	—	—	—N/a	Non-album singles
As featured artist
"Sunrise" (Kim Tae-woo featuring Punch)	2017	—	—N/a	—	—	—N/a	T-WITH
"Telephone" (Rocoberry featuring Punch)	2018	—	—N/a	—	—	—N/a	Telephone
"Winter Rain" (Eluphant featuring Punch)	2019	—	—N/a	—	—	—N/a	4
"Weird Day" (Moonbyul featuring Punch)	2020	96	—N/a	—	—	—N/a	Dark Side of the Moon
Soundtrack appearances
"Sleepless Night" (잠 못 드는 밤) (Crush featuring Punch)	2014	4	—N/a	—	—	KOR: 630,582	It's Okay, That's Love OST
"First Love" (첫사랑) (Tiger JK featuring Punch)	2014	63	—N/a	—	—	KOR: 55,364	Pinocchio OST
"Blow Away" (바람에 날려) (Baechigi featuring Punch)	2015	29	—N/a	—	—	KOR: 235,525	Who Are You: School 2015 OST
"Everytime" (with Chen)	2016	1	—N/a	—	14	KOR: 1,241,255	Descendants of the Sun OST
"Say Yes" (with Loco)	2016	15	—N/a	—	—	KOR: 300,980	Moon Lovers: Scarlet Heart Ryeo OST
"Stay with Me" (with Chanyeol)	2016	3	83	12	3	KOR: 2,500,000	Guardian: The Lonely and Great God OST
"When My Loneliness Calls You" (나의 외로움이 널 부를 때)	2017	—	—	—	—	—N/a	Missing 9 OST; SM Station Season 1
"Beautiful Beautiful" (with Glabingo)	2017	—	—	—	—	—N/a	Hit the Top OST
"Why Why Why"	2018	86	—	—	—	—N/a	Live OST
"I'll Love You"	2018	—	—	—	—	—N/a	Risky Romance OST
"Breeze" (featuring GREE)	2019	—	—	—	—	—N/a	The Fiery Priest OST
"Another Day" (with Monday Kiz)	2019	20	—	—	—	—N/a	Hotel Del Luna OST
"Done for Me"	2019	1	2	—	22	—N/a	Hotel Del Luna OST
"Love Del Luna" (with Taeyong)	2019	46	—	—	—	—N/a	Hotel Del Luna OST
"Like a Heroine in the Movie" (영화 속에 나오는 주인공처럼)	2019	49	30	—	—	—N/a	When the Camellia Blooms OST
"Go Away Go Away" (with Chanyeol)	2020	73	—	—	21	—N/a	Dr. Romantic 2 OST
"Close to Me"	2020	—	—	—	—	—N/a	Do You Like Brahms OST
"Love Me"	2020	119	—	—	—	—N/a	Do You Like Brahms OST
"Midnight" (with Heize)	2020	29	—	—	—	—N/a	Do You Like Brahms OST
"Spring Spring Spring" (봄봄봄)	2021	—	—	—	—	—N/a	At a Distance, Spring Is Green OST
"As It Was a Lie" (거짓말처럼)	2021	145	—	—	—	—N/a	Lovers of the Red Sky OST
"I Love You This Much" (이만큼 난 너를 사랑해)	2022	141	—	—	—	—N/a	Forecasting Love and Weather OST
"Bye Bye"	2022	109	—	—	—	—N/a	Our Blues OST
"Keep Me Busy"	2023						King the Land OST
"—" denotes releases that did not chart in that region. Notes: Billboard Korea K-Pop Hot 100 was introduced in August 2011, discontinued in July 2014 and returned on May 29, 2017.

== Filmography ==
=== Music videos ===
As a lead artist
Title	Year	Album	Notes
"End of The Night"	2018	End of The Night	Punch doesn't appear in the MV
"Love Me"	2019	Non-album single	

Videos of soundtracks
Title	Year	Other Artist(s)	Notes
"Everytime"	2016	With Chen	Containing only scenes of Descendants of the Sun
"Say Yes"	2016	With Loco	Containing only scenes of Moon Lovers: Scarlet Heart Ryeo
"Stay with Me"	2016	With Chanyeol	Contains some scenes of Guardian: The Lonely and Great God
"When My Loneliness Calls You"	2017	—N/a	Containing only scenes of Missing 9
"Beautiful Beautiful"	2017	With Glabingo	Containing only scenes of Hit the Top
"Why Why Why"	2018	—N/a	Containing only scenes of Live
"Breeze"	2019	With Gree	Containing only scenes of The Fiery Priest
"Another Day"	2019	With Monday Kiz	Containing only scenes of Hotel del Luna
"Done For Me"	2019	—N/a	Containing only scenes of Hotel del Luna

=== TV programs ===
Year	Title	Program	Notes	Episode
2019	In Sync	KBS2	Regular cast member	Episodes 1–4

== Awards and nominations ==
Year	Award	Category	Nominated work	Result	Ref.
2017	Asia Model Awards	Asia OST Popularity	"Stay with Me" (with Chanyeol)	Won	
2017	19th Mnet Asian Music Awards	Best OST	"Stay with Me" (with Chanyeol)	Nominated	
2018	13th KKBox Music Awards	Best Korean Single of the Year	"Stay with Me" (with Chanyeol)	Won	
2018	2019 Korea First Brand Awards	Best Female Vocalist	—N/a	Won	
2018	23rd Consumer Rights Day Awards:	Best Singer of the Year	—N/a	Won	
2018	Korea Hallyu Awards	Popular Culture Singer	—N/a	Won	
2019	8th Gaon Chart Music Awards	Song of the Year – February	Tonight	Nominated	
2019	8th Gaon Chart Music Awards	Song of the Year – September	Goodbye	Nominated	
2019	8th Gaon Chart Music Awards	Discovery of the Year (R&B Category)	—N/a	Won	
