= Rocoberry =

South Korean indie pop duo

- Origin: South Korea
- Genre: Indie pop
- Occupations: Singers; Songwriters
- Years active: 2014–present
- Label: Brotherhood Entertainment
- Members: Roco (Oh Ji-yeon); Conan (Ahn Young-min)
- Website: brotherhoodent.co.kr

Rocoberry (Hangul: 로코베리) is a South Korean indie pop duo consisting of members Roco and Conan (also known as Berry). They are best known for composing songs for Korean dramas, including the 2017 hit song, "I Will Go to You like the First Snow," performed by Ailee for the Guardian: The Lonely and Great God soundtrack. They have also composed songs for the soundtracks to Descendants of the Sun and Moon Lovers: Scarlet Heart Ryeo, among others.

== Career ==
In January 2023, Rocoberry established Brotherhood Entertainment and began full-scale music production under their own label. Through the company, they aimed to broaden their work across drama OSTs, project albums, and releases for new and established artists.

== Personal life ==
On August 20, 2018, Hayandal Entertainment confirmed that Rocoberry members Roco and Conan would marry on September 15, with the ceremony to be held at a church in Seoul. The two met in 2013 through a church praise band and later formed the group in 2014. After working together as musical partners for several years, they began a romantic relationship in 2017 and announced their marriage.

== Discography ==
=== Singles ===
Title	Year	Peak chart positions	Sales	Album
Title	Year	KOR	Sales	Album
As lead artist
"Body Fantasies"	2014	—	—N/a	Non-album singles
"I'm Fine" feat. Lee Bo-gyeong	2014	—	—N/a	Non-album singles
"Sailing" (항해)	2015	—	—N/a	Non-album singles
"End Of The Season" (계절 끝)	2016	—	—N/a	Non-album singles
"I.O.U"	2016	—	—N/a	Non-album singles
"Tto tto tto" (또 또 또)	2016	—	—N/a	Non-album singles
"Always"	2016	—	—N/a	Non-album singles
"In My Dream" (꿈속을 지나)	2017	—	—N/a	Non-album singles
"Broken Heart" (니가 내리는 거리)	2017	—	—N/a	Bob Shou Wa
"I Miss You"	2018	—	—N/a	Non-album singles
"Sometimes"	2018	—	—N/a	Non-album singles
"Old Habits" (오랜 습관)	2018	—	—N/a	Non-album singles
"Telephone" (전화) feat. Punch	2018	—	—N/a	Non-album singles
"Goodbye, Fall" (안녕, 가을아)	2018	—	—N/a	Non-album singles
"Everything About You" (너에 대한 모든 것)	2019	128	—N/a	Non-album singles
"When The Snow Falls" (흰눈이 내리면 넌 올거야)	2019	—	—N/a	Non-album singles
"Hot Summer"	2020	—	—N/a	Non-album singles
"roco is roco" (로코는 로코다)	2020	—	—N/a	Non-album singles
"My darling"	2020	—	—N/a	Non-album singles
"THIS CITY" (이 도시에는 내가 원하는 게 없어요)	2021	91	—N/a	Non-album singles
"Rain" (우산을 쓰고)	2023	78	—N/a	Non-album singles
"I Will Go to You Like the First Snow (2024)" (첫눈처럼 너에게 가겠다(2024))	2023	—	—N/a	Non-album singles
"Forget-me-not" (물망초(勿忘草))	2025	—	—N/a	Non-album singles
"ONLY YOU" (사랑해 너 하나만)	2025	—	—N/a	Non-album singles
"The End Of Love" (이별이라는 말로 우리의 연애가 끝난다는 게)	2025	—	—N/a	Non-album singles
Collaborations
"Winter Love" (어떤가요) with Son Ho-jun	2014	—	—N/a	Non-album single
"Lullaby" (수면제) with Onew	2017	60	KOR: 30,186+	SM Station Season 2
"At First Sight" (첫눈에) with D+I	2017	—	—N/a	Non-album single
"Don't say goodbye" (헤어지지말아요, 우리) with Doyoung	2019	30	—N/a	Non-album single
"Don't Forget" (한강의 밤) with Henry	2019	73	—N/a	Non-album single
"Happy Merry Christmas" (해피 미리 크리스마스) with Stella Jang	2020	—	—N/a	Non-album single
"Ten Reasons I Love You (2021)" (그대를 사랑하는 10가지 이유(2021)) with Lee Seok-hoon	2021	21	—N/a	Non-album single
"It`s sunny today" (오늘 날씨 맑음) with San E	2022	91	—N/a	Non-album single
Soundtrack appearances
"Console Myself" (나를 위로해)	2016	—	—N/a	Hey Ghost, Let's Fight OST
"—" denotes release did not chart.

=== EP ===
Title	Album details
First Love	Released: March 19, 2014 Track listing: 1. 9월의 바다; 2. Any; 3. 버스 정류장; 4. 마법의 주방; 5. 수면제
Merry Summer	Released: July 1, 2015 Track listing: 1. Merry Summer; 2. 디저트 송 3. 괜찮아, 청춘; 4. 달그림자; 5. 새벽에 내리는 비 6. Merry Summer (Inst.)
Bob Shu Wa	Released: September 17, 2017 Track listing: 1. Bob Shu Wa; 2. You & I 3. Broken Heart (Acoustic Ver.); 4. Honey Jam; 5. In Heaven; 6. Bob Shu Wa (Inst.)
How Is Your Night	Released: June 9, 2019 Track listing: 1. My Face is Red; 2. How Is Your Night; 3. Pride; 4. Say Goodbye; 5. So Far Away; 6. I'm Angry; 7. How Is Your Night(Inst.)

== Songwriting credits ==
Below are Rocoberry's songwriting credits for songs performed by other artists. An asterisks (*) denotes that only Roco is credited. Two asterisks (**) denotes that only Conan is credited. All information is from the Korean Music Copyright Association.

Year	Artist	Song	Album	Lyrics		Music		Arrangement	
Year	Artist	Song	Album	Credited	With	Credited	With	Credited	With
2008	Kim Jin-ho of SG Wannabe	"Confession" (고백)	East of Eden OST	No	Cho Yeong Soo	Yes**	−	No	Cho Yeong Soo
2008	Kim Jong-wook	"Thirst" (갈증)	East of Eden OST	No	Cho Yeong Soo	Yes**	−	No	Cho Yeong Soo
2008	Davichi	"Water bottle" (물병)	East of Eden OST	Yes**	−	Yes**	−	Yes**	−
2008	Howl	"One Person" (한사람)	Love Marriage OST	No	Howl	Yes**	−	No	Yoon Ji Ung
2008	Ahn Young Min	I Love You (그대를 사랑해)	Love Marriage OST	Yes**	−	Yes**	−	Yes**	−
2009	Jo Sung-mo	"I Love You" (사랑해)	Jeon Woo-chi: The Taoist Wizard OST	Yes**	−	Yes**	−	Yes**	−
2009	Changmin	"A Person Like Tears" (눈물 같은 사람)	Jeon Woo-chi: The Taoist Wizard OST	No	Park Min Jung	Yes**	−	Yes**	−
2009	Howl	"Love Theme" (사랑)	Cain and Abel OST	No	Howl	Yes**	−	No	Park Jun Ho
2009	Sunny Side feat. After School	"Half" (반쪽)	Tamra, the Island OST	No	Howl	Yes**	−	N/A	N/A
2010	Baek Ji-young	"Calling You" (가슴이 소리치는 말)	Road No. 1 OST	Yes**	N/A	Yes**	N/A	No	N/A
2010	Taeyeon	"I Love You" (사랑해요)	Athena: Goddess of War OST	Yes**	−	Yes**	−	Yes**	−
2012	Suzy	"I Still Love You" (그래도 사랑해)	Big OST	Yes**	−	Yes**	−	Yes**	−
2013	Davichi	"Don't You Know" (모르시나요)	Iris II: New Generation OST	Yes**	K-Smith	Yes**	−	Yes**	−
2013	Hyolyn	"Crazy of You" (미치게 만들어)	Master's Sun OST	Yes**	−	Yes**	−	Yes**	−
2014	Ladies' Code	"Make Me Go Crazy" (미치게 훅가게)	Flower Grandpa Investigation Unit OST	Yes**	Jihoon	Yes**	−	Yes**	−
2014	The One	"Because It's You" (그대라서)	Hotel King OST	Yes**	−	Yes**	Jihoon	No	N/A
2014	Kim Bo-kyung	"Calling You" (가슴이 소리치는 말)	Three Days OST	Yes**	Jihoon	Yes**	N/A	Yes**	N/A
2014	Davichi	"It′s Okay, That′s Love" (괜찮아 사랑이야)	It's Okay, That's Love OST	No	Jihoon	Yes	N/A	Yes	N/A
2014	Yoon Mi-rae	"I Love You" (너를 사랑해)	It's Okay, That's Love OST	No	Jihoon	Yes	N/A	No	N/A
2014	Crush	"Sleepless Night feat. Punch" (잠 못드는 밤)	It's Okay, That's Love OST	No	Jihoon	Yes**	N/A	Yes**	N/A
2014	Zion.T	"Kiss Me"	Pinocchio OST	Yes*	Jihoon	Yes	N/A	Yes	N/A
2014	Roy Kim	"Pinocchio" (피노키오)	Pinocchio OST	No	Jihoon	No	N/A	Yes**	N/A
2014	K.Will	"Only You"(하나뿐인 사람)	Pinocchio OST	No	Jihoon	Yes	N/A	Yes	N/A
2014	Tiger JK	"First Love" feat. Punch (첫사랑)	Pinocchio OST	No	Jihoon, Tiger JK	Yes	N/A	Yes	N/A
2014	Park Shin-hye	"Love Like Snow" (사랑은 눈처럼)	Pinocchio OST	No	Jihoon	Yes	N/A	Yes	Park Shin-won
2014	Sooyoung	"Windflower" (바람꽃)	My Spring Days OST	Yes*	Jihoon	Yes	−	Yes	−
2014	Infinite	"Crazy (Infinite F)" (미치겠어)	Season 2	Yes**	N/A	Yes**	N/A	No	N/A
2014	T-ara	"Last Calendar" (지난 달력)	And & End	Yes*	N/A	Yes	N/A	No	N/A
2014	T-ara	"If I See Her" (그녀를 보면)	And & End	Yes	N/A	Yes**	N/A	No	N/A
2014	TAESABIAE	Though I'm Sad, I Love You (슬퍼도 사랑해)	My Dear Cat OST	Yes**	Oh Jing Jing	Yes**	−	Yes**	−
2014	2BIC	"I Love Her" (내가 사랑하는 그녀는)	Genuine	Yes	−	Yes	−	Yes	−
2014	2BIC	"If We Love Again" (우리 다시 사랑한다면)	Genuine	Yes	Cho Young-soo	No	Cho Young-soo	No	Cho Young-soo
2015	Ailee	"Are You the Same?" (그대도 같은가요)	Shine or Go Crazy OST	No	N/A	Yes	N/A	Yes	N/A
2015	Postmen	"Missing You" (그리워 그리워하다)	Shine or Go Crazy OST	No	N/A	Yes	N/A	Yes	N/A
2015	Shannon	"Remember Our Love"	Shine or Go Crazy OST	No	N/A	Yes	N/A	Yes	O Jing-jing
2015	Song Ji-eun	"Person Who I Miss" (보고 싶은 사람)	Shine or Go Crazy OST	No	Jihoon	Yes	−	Yes	−
2015	Byul	"Remember"	Who Are You: School 2015 OST	No	N/A	Yes	N/A	Yes	N/A
2015	Yoon Mi-rae	"I Will Listen Never Alone" (너의 얘길 들어줄게)	Who Are You: School 2015 OST	No	Jihoon	Yes	N/A	Yes	N/A
2015	Jonghyun & Taemin	"That Name"	Who Are You: School 2015 OST	Yes	Jihoon	No	N/A	No	N/A
2015	Younha	"Pray"	Who Are You: School 2015 OST	Yes	Jihoon	No	N/A	No	N/A
2015	Lee Soo of MC the Max	"My Destiny" (가슴에 내린다)	My Destiny	Yes	K-Smith	Yes	N/A	Yes	N/A
2015	Magolpy	"Endless Love" (언제나 사랑해)	Sweet Home, Sweet Honey OST	No	Cho Yeong Soo	Yes**	Cho Yeong Soo	No	N/A
2015	Hong Jin-young	"I Love You" (사랑이 좋아)	All About My Mom OST	No	Jihoon, Gamy	Yes**	−	No	Oh Jing Jing
2015	Shannon	"Daybreak Rain" (새벽비)	Eighteen	Yes**	−	Yes**	−	No	Lee Yu-jin
2015	PK Heman & Kassy	"Blossom Night" (벚꽃, 밤)	Non-album singles	Yes	PK Heman	Yes**	−	Yes**	−
2015	HeartB & Zia	"Missing You" (혼잣말)	REMEMBER	No	Howl	Yes	−	Yes	−
2016	Yoon Mi-rae & Punch	"How You Doing" (잘 지내고 있니)	How You Doing	No	Jihoon, Tiger JK	Yes	earattack	No	earattack
2016	Woohyun	"Stand by Me"	Write..	Yes**	Nam Woohyun	Yes**	Nam Woohyun	No	N/A
2016	Akdong Musician	"Be With You"	Moon Lovers: Scarlet Heart Ryeo OST	No	N/A	Yes	Lee Chan-hyuk	Yes	N/A
2016	Davichi	"Forgetting You" (그대를 잊는다는 건)	Moon Lovers: Scarlet Heart Ryeo OST	No	N/A	Yes	N/A	Yes	N/A
2016	Loco & Punch	"Say Yes"	Moon Lovers: Scarlet Heart Ryeo OST	No	N/A	Yes	N/A	Yes	N/A
2016	Sunhae Im	"Will Be Back" (꼭 돌아오리)	Moon Lovers: Scarlet Heart Ryeo OST	No	N/A	Yes	N/A	Yes	N/A
2016	Dohyuck Lim	"Goodbye feat.Roco"(듣고 싶은 말)	Moon Lovers: Scarlet Heart Ryeo OST	No	N/A	Yes**	N/A	Yes**	N/A
2016	Jung Seung-hwan	"Wind" (바람)	Moon Lovers: Scarlet Heart Ryeo OST	No	N/A	Yes	N/A	Yes	N/A
2016	Baek A-yeon	"A Lot Like Love" (사랑인 듯 아닌 듯)	Moon Lovers: Scarlet Heart Ryeo OST	No	N/A	Yes	N/A	Yes	N/A
2016	Epik High	"Can You Hear My Heart feat. Lee Hi" (내 마음 들리나요)	Moon Lovers: Scarlet Heart Ryeo OST	No	Tablo, Mithra Jin	Yes	Tablo, DJ Tukutz	Yes	DJ Tukutz
2016	EXO-CBX	"For You" (너를 위해)	Moon Lovers: Scarlet Heart Ryeo OST	No	N/A	Yes	N/A	Yes	N/A
2016	Chen & Punch	"Everytime"	Descendants of the Sun OST	No	N/A	Yes	Cho Yeong-su, Ear Attack	Yes*	Ear Attack
2016	Yoon Mi-rae	"Always"	Descendants of the Sun OST	No	N/A	Yes	N/A	Yes*	N/A
2016	2BIC	"Yours Mine" (니꺼내꺼)	Yours Mine	Yes	Hangil	Yes**	Hangil	No	Hangil, D&T
2016	Ailee	"Because It's Love" (사랑이니까)	Come Back Mister OST	No	Jihoon	Yes	−	Yes*	−
2017	Jang Jae-in	"When I Dream"	The Good Wife OST	No	N/A	Yes	N/A	Yes	N/A
2017	Cha Eun-woo	"Cry"	Hit the Top OST	No	N/A	Yes	N/A	Yes	N/A
2017	T-ARA	"My Love"	Hit the Top OST	No	Jihoon	Yes**	−	Yes**	−
2017	Yoon Mi-rae	"Sky" (젊은 날의)	Hit the Top OST	No	Jihoon	Yes	−	Yes	−
2017	BoA & Mad Clown	"Tonight" (오늘 밤)	Hit the Top OST	No	Jihoon, Beautiful Noise	Yes	−	Yes	−
2017	Lee Se-young	"Propose" (노래로 하는 고백)	Hit the Top OST	No	Jihoon	Yes	−	Yes	−
2017	ZeeAnn	"Permanent Marker"	Non-album singles	No	N/A	No	N/A	Yes	Park Shin-won
2017	Soyou	"I Miss You"	Guardian: The Lonely and Great God OST	No	N/A	Yes	N/A	Yes	N/A
2017	Chanyeol & Punch	"Stay With Me"	Guardian: The Lonely and Great God OST	No	N/A	Yes*	N/A	Yes	N/A
2017	Ailee	"I Will Go to You Like the First Snow" (첫눈처럼 너에게 가겠다)	Guardian: The Lonely and Great God OST	No	N/A	Yes	N/A	Yes	N/A
2017	Davichi	"I Miss You Today Too"	While You Were Sleeping OST	No	N/A	Yes	N/A	No	N/A
2017	Suzy	"Words I Want To Hear" (듣고 싶은 말)	While You Were Sleeping OST	No	N/A	Yes	N/A	No	N/A
2017	Davichi	"Autumn Night" (가을의 밤)	50 X HALF	Yes	−	Yes**	−	Yes	−
2017	Lee Si-eun & Jung Seung-hwan	"Tears" (눈물나게)	1st Digital Single 'Tears'	Yes	−	Yes	−	No	1601
2017	Shin Hye-sung	"Suddenly" (문득)	Serenity	Yes	−	Yes	−	Yes	−
2018	Davichi	"Love You More" (내가 더 사랑하는 일)	&10	Yes	Kang Min-kyung	Yes	N/A	No	N/A
2018	IZ	"Ole Ole"	Angel	Yes	N/A	No	N/A	No	N/A
2018	Davichi	"Because You" (그대니까요)	Live OST	No	N/A	Yes	N/A	Yes	N/A
2018	Punch	"Why Why Why"	Live OST	No	N/A	Yes	N/A	Yes	N/A
2018	Han Dong-geun	"You Are At The End of My Day" (하루끝엔 그대가 있어요)	Live OST	No	N/A	Yes	N/A	Yes	N/A
2018	Onew	"Blue"	Voice	No	N/A	Yes	N/A	Yes	N/A
2018	Onew	"거리마다 (Your Scent)"	Voice	Yes	N/A	Yes**	N/A	Yes**	N/A
2018	Onew	"사랑이었을까 (Illusion)"	Voice	Yes	Onew	Yes**	N/A	Yes**	N/A
2018	Chungha	"How About You" (어떤가요 그댄)	Luv Pub OST	Yes*	−	Yes**	−	Yes	−
2018	Punch	"I will always love you" (널 사랑할게)	Risky Romance OST	No	Jihoon	Yes**	−	Yes**	−
2018	Punch	"Tonight" (오늘밤도)	Tonight	No	Jihoon	Yes	−	Yes	−
2018	Realslow	"Reasons for Waiting" (내가 기다리는 이유)	The Ghost Detective OST	No	Jihoon	Yes**	−	Yes	−
2018	Park Na-rae (Spica)	"To You" (너에게)	The Ghost Detective OST	No	N/A	Yes	N/A	No	N/A
2018	GilguBongu	"Porpose" (프로포즈)	Suits OST	No	N/A	Yes	N/A	Yes	N/A
2018	Mamamoo	"You In My Dreams" (꿈 속의 그대)	Suits OST	No	N/A	Yes	N/A	Yes	N/A
2018	Jung Eun-ji	"Stay" (바람 불면)	Suits OST	No	N/A	Yes	N/A	Yes	N/A
2018	Soyou & Ha Hyun-woo & Yoon Do-hyun	"I Miss You"	Road to Ithaca OST	No	Jihoon	Yes	−	No	Yoon Do-hyun
2018	The ADE	"The Break-up" (헤어지고 있었어)	0.5	Yes	−	Yes	−	No	1601
2019	Punch	"Kiss Me"	Dream of You	Yes*	Jihoon	Yes	−	Yes	−
2019	Heize	"Run to You" (오롯이)	Non-album singles	No	Jihoon	Yes	−	Yes	−
2019	Bigman	"하루하루 (Day by Day)"	DAY BY DAY	Yes*	N/A	Yes**	N/A	Yes	N/A
2019	Bigman	"Day by Day" (English ver.)	DAY BY DAY	Yes*	Kim Eun-hye	Yes**	N/A	Yes	N/A
2019	Yoona	"When The Wind Blows" (바람이 불면)	A Walk to Remember	Yes**	Yoona	Yes**	N/A	Yes**	N/A
2019	Gummy	"Remember All My Days And Then" (기억해줘요 내 모든 날과 그때를)	Hotel del Luna OST	No	N/A	Yes	Kangaroo	No	N/A
2019	Ben	"Can You Hear My Voice" (내 목소리 들리니)	Hotel del Luna OST	No	N/A	Yes	N/A	No	N/A
2019	Paul Kim	"So Long" (안녕)	Hotel del Luna OST	No	N/A	Yes	Paul Kim	No	N/A
2019	Ha Yea Song	"Say Goodbye"	Hotel del Luna OST	No	N/A	Yes**	N/A	Yes**	
2020	Gummy	"Your Day" (너의 하루는 좀 어때)	Dr. Romantic 2 OST	No	Jihoon	Yes	−	No	Yes
2020	Chanyeol (EXO) & Punch	"Go Away Go Away"	Dr. Romantic 2 OST	No	Punch, Jihoon	Yes	−	Yes	−
2020	Monday Kiz	"You Don't Know" (모르시죠)	Dr. Romantic 2 OST	No	Jihoon	Yes	−	Yes	−
2020	Heize & Punch	"Midnight" (밤하늘의 저 별처럼)	Do You Like Brahms? OST	No	N/A	Yes	Pinkpage	No	N/A
2020	K.Will	"Beautiful" (아름다운 한 사람)	Do You Like Brahms? OST	No	N/A	Yes	N/A	No	N/A
2020	Gummy	"Love Song" (노래해요 그대 듣도록)	Do You Like Brahms? OST	No	No	Yes**	N/A	Yes	N/A
2020	O.WHEN	"Sometimes (Prod. Rocoberry)" (가끔은 그래도 괜찮아)	Traveler OST	Yes	N/A	Yes**	N/A	No	N/A
2020	Rothy	"Flower (Prod. Rocoberry)" (꽃은 따라서)	Traveler OST	Yes	N/A	Yes**	N/A	No	N/A
2020	Punch	"Say Yes" feat. Moonbyul of Mamamoo	Say Hello	No	Jihoon	Yes	−	No	최인환
2020	Punch	"Say Hello" (안부)	Say Hello	No	Punch	Yes	최인환	Yes	−
2021	Loco & Lee Sung-Kyung	"Love" (러브)	Non-album singles	Yes	Loco	Yes	N/A	Yes	N/A
2021	Giriboy & Kim You-jung	"Your Night, Your Star, Your Moon" (너의 밤,너의 별,너의 달)	Non-album singles	Yes	Giriboy	Yes	Giriboy	No	KWAK Z
2021	T-ara	"All Kill"	Re:T-ara	Yes**	N/A	No	N/A	No	N/A
2021	Sohyang	"Pray" (기도)	Begin Again Korea OST	Yes	Jihoon	No	Sohyang	No	Kim Young-ho
2021	Punch	"We're Breaking Up" (헤어지는거죠)	We're Breaking Up	No	Punch	Yes	−	Yes	−
2021	Punch	"My Everything" (안녕 내 전부였던 너)	Full Bloom	No	Punch	Yes	−	Yes	−
2021	Punch	"Not" (아니)	Full Bloom	No	Punch	Yes	−	Yes	−
2021	Wonstein	"When Night Is Falling" (밤이 되니까)	Non-album singles	No	Wonstein	Yes	−	Yes	−
2022	Jimin (BTS) & Ha Sung-woon	"With You"	Our Blues OST	No	N/A	Yes	N/A	No	N/A
2022	Kassy	”Always love you (언제나 사랑해)"	Cho YoungSoo Remake Project, Part 2	Yes**	Cho Young Soo	Yes**	Cho Young Soo	No	N/A
2022	Miyeon of (G)I-DLE	"You Were My Breath" (너는 나의 숨이였다)	Non-album singles	Yes	−	Yes	−	Yes	−
2022	Yang Da-il	"LOVE IS (prod. Rocoberry)"(사랑이란)	Non-album singles	Yes	−	Yes	−	Yes	−
2022	JUSTHIS feat. Soyou	나는 이별이에요 (prod. Rocoberry)	Non-album singles	Yes	Justhis	Yes	−	Yes	−
2022	JUSTHIS	"Are We Done?" (우리 헤어지니)	Non-album singles	No	Justhis	Yes	−	Yes	−
2022	Kim Ho-yeon	It will be all fine (다 잘될 거야)	Dingo Story 'Lean On Me' OST	Yes	−	Yes	−	Yes	−
2023	Gummy	"A Song For You" (그댈 위한 노래)	Non-album singles	Yes**	Gummy	Yes	−	Yes	−
2023	Jinyoung	"Letter" (편지)	Chapter 0: WITH	No	Jinyoung	Yes**	−	Yes**	−
2023	Woody	"RUN"	My Lovely Liar OST	Yes**	OSH	Yes	−	No	Lee Yu Jin
2023	SEULGI	"Polaroid"	Unexpected Business 3 OST	Yes	Adora, xelor	No	Adora	No	Adora
2023	Youngji of KARA	"L.O.V.E"	Toi Toi Toi	No	Seo Ji-eum	Yes	AVIN	No	AVIN
2024	Hwagok-dong green frog	"Remember Me" (기억해줘요 내 모든 날과 그때를)	Non-album singles	No	Jihoon, Park Se-joon	Yes	Kangaroo	No	Lee So-hee
2024	EJel	"LONELY (Prod. Rocoberry & LAS)" (멸망한 사랑)	Sing Again 3 OST	Yes	LAS	Yes	LAS	Yes	LAS
2024	Adora feat. Natty of Kiss of Life	"Dusk Twilight" (밤이 되니까)	Non-album singles	No	Jihoon	Yes	−	No	Lee Yu-jin
2024	Punch	"Run Far Away"	Nothing Uncovered OST	Yes	Punch	No	Punch	No	riskypizza
2024	HYNN	"Memory" (상처)	Nothing Uncovered OST	No	Jihoon, Choi In-hee	Yes	−	No	ONCLASSA
2024	Lee Seok-hoon	"Still Loving You" (사랑한다 말해요)	Nothing Uncovered OST	No	Jihoon, Choi In-hee	Yes	ONCLASSA	No	ONCLASSA
2024	Cho Jung-suk	"Aurora"	CHO JUNG SEOK 1ST	No	Cho Jung-suk	Yes	Cho Jung-suk	Yes	–
2024	Cho Jung-suk	"Loving, for you" (미듐의 정석)	CHO JUNG SEOK 1ST	No	Cho Jung-suk	Yes	Cho Jung-suk	No	Lee Yoo-jin
2024	Cho Jung-suk	"Like a movie, like music" (With.Dynamic Duo)	CHO JUNG SEOK 1ST	No	Cho Jung-suk, Gaeko, Choiza	No	Cho Jung-suk, Gaeko	Yes	Ikbbo
2024	Cho Jung-suk	"The Man of the East" (동부의 사나이)	CHO JUNG SEOK 1ST	No	Cho Jung-suk	Yes	Cho Jung-suk	No	Lee Yoo-jin
2024	Cho Jung-suk	"First Hello" (Duet.Gummy)	CHO JUNG SEOK 1ST	No	Cho Jung-suk	Yes	–	No	Lee Yoo-jin
2024	Cho Jung-suk	"Friend" (천천히 가자)	CHO JUNG SEOK 1ST	No	Cho Jung-suk	No	Cho Jung-suk	Yes	–
2024	Cho Jung-suk	"Faded Pictures" (With Gummy)	CHO JUNG SEOK 1ST	No	Cho Jung-suk	No	Cho Jung-suk, Park Hyo-shin	Yes	THAMA
2024	Seo In-guk	"Thread of fate 運命の糸"(운명의 실)	SIGnature	No	Seo In-guk, Nore Akane	Yes	Nois upGrader	No	Nois upGrader
2024	JUEUN	"1,2,3,4" (feat.Moon Sujin)	Non-album singles	No	JUEUN, Moon Sujin	Yes**	JUEUN	No	Nois upGrader
2024	Ryu Min-hee	"I LIKE YOU" (고백해 봄)	Non-album singles	Yes**	–	Yes**	–	Yes**	–
2024	Ryu Min-hee	"JUST THE TWO OF US" (둘이라면 류민희)	Non-album singles	Yes**	–	Yes**	–	Yes**	–
2024	Lee Bo-ram	"Love, Always" (너를 사랑하니까)	Non-album singles	No	Jihoon	Yes**	–	No	Lee Yoo-jin
2024	Ryu Min-hee	"MY MELODY" (나의 멜로디로 널 찾을 거야)	Non-album singles	Yes**	–	Yes**	–	Yes**	Lee Yoo-jin
2024	Ryu Min-hee	"don`t forget me" (부디 나를 잊지 말아요)	Non-album singles	Yes**	–	Yes**	–	Yes**	–
2024	LAS	"How to use love" (연애 사용법) feat. Grizzly	Non-album singles	Yes	AVIN, SLAY	Yes	AVIN, SLAY	No	Hyo's, AVIN, SLAY
2024	Ari K	"Goodbye in Blue" (슬퍼져도 안녕 안녕)	Non-album singles	Yes**	–	Yes**	–	Yes**	–
2025	Paul Kim	"yours" (안녕)	Sincerely yours (10th Anniversary Edition)	No	Paul Kim, Jihoon, Park Se-jun	Yes	Paul Kim	Yes	Lee So-hee
2025	Lee Chan-won	"October's Poem" (시월의 시)	Brilliant	Yes	–	Yes**	–	Yes**	–
2025	ChoNam Zone (Cho Sae-ho, Nam Chang-hee)	"DON`T SAY GOODBYE" (아직 못 들었는데)	Non-album singles	Yes**	Cho Sae-ho	Yes**	Cho Sae-ho	Yes	–
2025	Ryu Min-hee	"I LOVE YOU" (사랑을 했다)	Non-album singles	Yes**	–	Yes**	–	Yes**	–
2025	ZOZAZZ	"LOVE" (사랑)	Non-album singles	Yes	Zozazz	Yes**	–	No	Lee Yoo-jin
2025	CHOONGJU JI-C (Jee Seok-jin, Ji Ye-eun)	"Milkshake" (밀크쉐이크) feat. Wonstein	Non-album singles	Yes**	Wonstein, Park Shin-won	No	Kim Chang-hyun	Ni	Park Shin-won, Kim Chang-hyun
2025	Park Sang-min	"euphoria" (사랑하니까)	Non-album singles	Yes	–	Yes**	–	Yes**	–
2025	ZOZAZZ	"SONG FOR YOU" (한잔의 노래)	Non-album singles	Yes	Zozazz	Yes**	Lee Yoo-jin	No	Lee Jae-sung
2025	DinDin, Song Ha-young	"Sleepless" (잠이 안와)	Non-album singles	Yes	LAS, COUP D'ETAT	Yes*	DinDin, Hyo's	No	COUP D'ETAT, Hyo's
2025	Gavy NJ	"Happiness (2025)"	The Gavy NJ	Yes**	Min Myung-gi	No	Min Myung-gi	No	Lee Yul-yi
2025	Lee Jun-young	"Why Are You Doing This to Me" (그대 내게 왜 이러나요)	Last Dance	Yes	LAS	Yes**	LAS	No	opro
2025	Lee Soo-yeon	"Thunderbolt" 천둥	Non-album singles	Yes**	Cho Young-soo	No	Cho Young-soo	No	Heurim
2025	IHWAK	"A FOOL OF TEARS" (곡명 눈물뿐인 바보)	Non-album singles	Yes**	–	No	Jeon Seung-soo	No	Lee Yoo-jin
2025	Lee Hyun	"With You" (그대와)	Non-album singles	Yes	LAS	Yes**	LAS, Hyo's	No	LAS, Hyo's
2025	Lee KyuRa	"Violin" (바이올린)	Non-album singles	Yes**	–	No	Cho Young-soo	No	5Talent
2025	IHWAK	"I CAN`T SAY GOODBYE" (헤어지지 못해)	Non-album singles	Yes**	IHWAK	Yes**	–	Yes**	–
2025	Zia	"A Timid Woman (PROD. ROCOBERRY)" (소심한 여자)	Non-album singles	Yes	–	Yes**	–	Yes**	–
