= Asan Jang clan =

Korean clan from South Chungcheong Province

Jang clan of Asan
- Country: Korea
- Current region: Asan
- Founder: Jang Seo
- Connected members: Jang Jung-il; Chang Yŏngsil

Jang clan of Asan (Korean: 아산 장씨; Hanja: 牙山 蔣氏) was one of the Korean clans. Their Bon-gwan was in Asan, South Chungcheong Province. According to the research in 2000, the number of Jang clan of Asan was 17695. Their founder was Jang Seo who served as Jinzi Guanglu Daifu (Hanja: 金紫光祿大夫) in Song dynasty. Jang Seo insisted that he would resist Jin dynasty if Wanyan Zongyao (Hanja: 完顏宗堯) in Jin dynasty invaded Song dynasty, but his claim was not accepted. Then, he exiled himself to Goryeo and was appointed as Prince of Asan (Hanja: 牙山君) from Yejong of Goryeo. Finally, he began Jang clan of Asan and made Asan their Bon-gwan.

== See also ==
- Korean clan names of foreign origin
