= Yoo Hye-ri =

South Korean actress (born 1964)

- Born: 15 August 1964 (age 62); Pyeongtaek, South Korea
- Other names: Yu Hye-ri, Choi Soon-wook, Choi Soon-ok
- Education: Dankook University (Bachelor of Costume)
- Occupations: Actress; model
- Years active: 1985–present
- Known for: Golden Pouch; Sweet Home, Sweet Honey; You're Only Mine
- Spouse: Lee Geun-hee (m. 1994; div. 1998)
- Family: Choi Su-rin (younger sister); Son Seung Hoon-Lee (nephew)

Choi Soo-yeon (Korean: 최수연), better known by the stage name Yoo Hye-ri (유혜리), is a South Korean actress and model. She is known for her roles in dramas such as Golden Pouch, Sweet Home, Sweet Honey and You're Only Mine.

== Personal life ==
She was married to actor Lee Geun-hee in 1994. She met him when they were performing together in theater. They divorced in 1998. She and her younger sister Choi Su-rin are both actresses.

== Filmography ==
=== Television ===
Year	Title	Role
1992	Red Zone	Go Hyo-re
1994	Heavenly Wayfarers	Nam-hee
1995	The Road	Kim Soon-ah
1997	Model	Yu-ri
1997	Colour	Jung-seop
1997	Yesterday	Yeon-seung
1997	Spin	Ha-joong
2001	Hong Guk Young	Princess Hwa Wan
2001	Flower Story	Kang-min
2001–2002	Stepmother	Madam Oh
2002	Miss Mermaid	Herself
2003	A Saint and a Witch	Oh Kuk-joo
2004	Island Village Teacher	Min Yeong-sun
2004	My Lovely Family	Madam Choi
2005	Fashion 70s	Byeol-dong
2005	A Love to Kill	Park Ja-kyeong
2006	Here Comes Ajumma	Ko Guem-hwa
2007	Mackerel Run	Heo Yeong-sook
2008	Don't Go Away	Jeon-young
2008	You Are My Destiny	Sae Byeok's real mother
2009	Again, My Love	Pyo Se-rim
2009	Cinderella Man	Lady Oh Seon-yeong
2010	Queen of Reversals	Goo Yong-sik's mother
2011	A Thousand Days' Promise	Guem-yoon
2012	Ice Adonis	Jang Min-ja
2012	Love Rain	Baek Hye-jeong
2013	Crazy Love	Heo Myeong-ja
2013	The Secret of Birth	Lady Jo
2014	The Noblesse	Hwang Myeong-soon
2014	You're Only Mine	Oh Gwang-ja
2015	Sweet Home, Sweet Honey	Lee Mi-dal
2016	Golden Pouch	Sa Gwi-jeong

=== Film ===
Year	Title	Role	Language
1989	Today's Woman	Hwe-yoo	Korean
1990	The Lovers of Woomook-baemi	Sae-daek	Korean
1992	Silence of the Body	Hye-ryeon	Korean
1992	Jazz Bar Hiroshima	Ju-hee	Korean
1993	When Adam Opens His Eyes	Painter	Korean
1995	A Man Wagging His Tail	Ms.Kim	Korean
2002	A Bizarre Love Triangle	Masseuse	Korean
2007	The Wonder Years	Chi Su-ri	Korean

== Awards and nominations ==
- 1990: 28th Daejong Awards Film Festival – Best Actress
