= Han River Police =

2023 South Korean television series

- Promotional poster
- Hangul: 한강
- Hanja: 漢江
- Lit.: Han River
- RR: Hangang
- MR: Han'gang
- Genre: Action comedy
- Written by: Kim Sang-cheol
- Directed by: Kim Sang-cheol
- Starring: Kwon Sang-woo; Kim Hee-won; Lee Sang-yi; Bae Da-bin; Shin Hyun-seung; Sung Dong-il
- Country of origin: South Korea
- Original language: Korean
- No. of episodes: 6

Production
- Running time: 46–53 minutes
- Production companies: Arc Media; Film Monster

Original release
- Network: Disney+
- Release: September 13 – September 27, 2023

Han River Police (Korean: 한강) is a 2023 South Korean action comedy television series written and directed by Kim Sang-cheol, starring Kwon Sang-woo, Kim Hee-won, Lee Sang-yi, Bae Da-bin, Shin Hyun-seung, and Sung Dong-il. It was released on Disney+ from September 13 to 27, 2023.

== Synopsis ==
Late at night, after completing a rescue operation and returning to the precinct, Doo-jin spots Ki-seok conducting suspicious work on a stranded cruise ship, trying to evade the eyes of the police. Sensing something fishy, Doo-jin begins to track his movements.

At the center of a series of crimes unfolding along the Han River are Ki-seok, the Gyeongin River Cruise company, and Baek-cheol, a man who was once like family. As the situation escalates, the Han River Police Force becomes entangled in a complex case threatening the safety of the river and its citizens.

== Cast and characters ==
- Kwon Sang-woo as Han Doo-jin
- Kim Hee-won as Lee Chun-seok
- Lee Sang-yi as Ko Ki-seok
- Bae Da-bin as Do Na-hee
- Shin Hyun-seung as Kim Ji-Soo
- Sung Dong-il as Do Won-Il
- Han Ji-hye as Eun-sook

== Production ==
=== Development ===
The series was announced on Disney+ consisting of six episodes. The press conference was held at the JW Marriott Dongdaemun in Jongno District, Seoul on September 12, 2023.

=== Casting ===
Kwon Sang-woo, Kim Hee-won, Lee Sang-yi and Bae Da-bin along with Shin Hyun-seung were reportedly cast to appear.

=== Filming ===
Principal photography began on August 15, 2022 and filming was wrapped up on January 5, 2023.

== Release ==
The series was made available to stream exclusively on Disney+ on September 13, 2023.

== Reception ==
Carmen Chin of NME awarded the series two stars out of five. Melissa Foong of Lifestyle Asia and Stephen McCarty of South China Morning Post reviewed the series.
