= Do You Like Brahms? =

2020 South Korean television series

- Promotional poster
- Hangul: 브람스를 좋아하세요?
- RR: Beuramseureul joahaseyo?
- MR: Pŭramsŭrŭl choahaseyo?
- Genre: Romance; Music
- Written by: Ryu Bo-ri
- Directed by: Jo Young-min
- Starring: Park Eun-bin; Kim Min-jae; Kim Sung-cheol; Park Ji-hyun; Lee You-jin; Bae Da-bin
- Country of origin: South Korea
- Original language: Korean
- No. of episodes: 16

Production
- Producer: Han Jeong hwan
- Running time: 60 minutes
- Production company: Studio S

Original release
- Network: SBS TV
- Release: August 31 – October 20, 2020

Do You Like Brahms? (Korean: 브람스를 좋아하세요?; RR: Beuramseureul joahaseyo?) is a South Korean television series starring Kim Min-jae, Park Eun-bin, Kim Sung-cheol, Park Ji-hyun, Lee You-jin, and Bae Da-bin. It is a romance drama about the students of classical music at a prestigious institution. It aired on SBS from August 31 to October 20, 2020, every Monday and Tuesday at 22:00 (KST).

== Synopsis ==
A drama about the dreams and love of classical music students who find their own happiness while learning music.

== Cast ==
=== Main ===
- Kim Min-jae as Park Joon-young
  - Park Sang-hoon as young Park Joon-young
- Park Eun-bin as Chae Song-ah
- Kim Sung-cheol as Han Hyun-ho
- Park Ji-hyun as Lee Jung-kyung
  - Shin Soo-yeon as young Lee Jung-kyung
- Lee You-jin as Yoon Dong-yoon
- Bae Da-bin as Kang Min-sung

=== Supporting ===
==== Kyunghoo Cultural Foundation ====
- Ye Soo-jung as Na Moon-sook
- Kim Jong-tae as Lee Sung-geun
- Seo Jeong-yeon as Cha Young-in
- Choi Dae-hoon as Park Sung-jae
- Ahn Sang-eun as Jung Da-woon
- Lee Ji-won as Kim Hae-na
- Yang Jo-ah as Im Yoo-jin

==== Seoryeong University ====
- Gil Hae-yeon as Song Jeong-hee
- Baek Ji-won as Lee Soo-kyeong
- Joo Seok-tae as Yoo Tae-jin

==== People around Chae Song-ah ====
- Kim Hak-sun as Song-ah's father
- Kim Sun-hwa as Song-ah's mother
- Lee Noh-ah as Chae Song-hee, Song-ah's elder sister

=== Others ===
- Kim Jung-young as Park Joon-young's mother
- Ko So-hyun as Yang Ji-won, violinist
- Kim Gook-hee as Ji-won's mother
- Yoon Chan-young as Seung Ji-min, pianist
- Kim Mi-kyung as maestro

== Production ==
Director Jo Young-min and screenwriter Ryu Bo-ri previously collaborated on the 2019 SBS drama, Everything and Nothing.

The first script reading took place in April 2020 at the SBS Tanhyeon Production Center. The drama wrapped its filming on October 15, 2020.

== Original soundtrack ==
Do You Like Brahms? OST

Soundtrack album by Various artists
- Released: 2020
- Genre: Soundtrack
- Language: Korean
- Labels: Kakao M; YamYam Entertainment

Part 1

Released on September 1, 2020
No.	Title	Lyrics	Music	Artist	Length
1.	"Close To Me"	Ji Hoon; Jay Kim	Cha Ji-hye; Hwang Chan-hee	Punch	3:32
2.	"Close To Me" (Inst.)		Cha Ji-hye; Hwang Chan-hee		3:32
Total length:					7:04

Part 2

Released on September 7, 2020
No.	Title	Lyrics	Music	Artist	Length
1.	"Confession" (지금 만나러 갈게)	Ji Hoon; Jay Kim	KZ; Jung Su-min; Kim Hye-kwang	g.o.d	4:16
2.	"Confession" (Inst.)		KZ; Jung Su-min; Kim Hye-kwang		4:16
Total length:					8:32

Part 3

Released on September 8, 2020
No.	Title	Lyrics	Music	Artist	Length
1.	"Your Moonlight" (너의 달빛)	Ji Hoon; Jay Kim	Choi In-hwan; Lee Seung-joo	Chen (EXO)	3:44
2.	"Your Moonlight" (Inst.)		Choi In-hwan; Lee Seung-joo		3:44
Total length:					7:28

Part 4

Released on September 14, 2020
No.	Title	Lyrics	Music	Artist	Length
1.	"Love Me" (널 사랑했던 한 사람)	Punch; Ji Hoon; Jay Kim	Lee Seung-joo; Choi In-hwan	Punch	3:58
2.	"Love Me" (Inst.)		Lee Seung-joo; Choi In-hwan		3:58
Total length:					7:56

Part 5

Released on September 15, 2020
No.	Title	Lyrics	Music	Artist	Length
1.	"Kiss Me" (내일은 고백할게)	Ji Hoon; Bae Jin-young; Jay Kim	Ashley Aisha (153/Joombas); Hyuk Shin	Taeyeon (Girls' Generation)	3:58
2.	"Kiss Me" (Inst.)		Ashley Aisha (153/Joombas); Hyuk Shin		3:58
Total length:					7:56

Part 6

Released on September 21, 2020
No.	Title	Lyrics	Music	Artist	Length
1.	"Dream" (그리워하면 그댈 만날까봐)	Ji Hoon; Jay Kim	Hwang Chan-hee; Lee Seung-joo; Choi In-hwan	Kim Na-young	3:27
2.	"Dream" (Inst.)		Hwang Chan-hee; Lee Seung-joo; Choi In-hwan		3:27
Total length:					6:54

Part 7

Released on September 22, 2020
No.	Title	Lyrics	Music	Artist	Length
1.	"My Love"	Ji Hoon; Jay Kim	A10TION; Noheul	Jo Yu-ri (Iz*One)	3:05
2.	"My Love" (Inst.)		A10TION; Noheul		3:05
Total length:					6:10

Part 8

Released on September 27, 2020
No.	Title	Lyrics	Music	Artist	Length
1.	"Midnight" (밤하늘의 저 별처럼)	Punch; Ji Hoon; Jay Kim	Rocoberry; Pinkpage	Heize; Punch	3:47
2.	"Midnight" (Inst.)		Rocoberry; Pinkpage		3:47
Total length:					7:34

Part 9

Released on September 28, 2020
No.	Title	Lyrics	Music	Artist	Length
1.	"Beautiful" (아름다운 한 사람)	Ji Hoon; Jay Kim	Rocoberry	K.Will	3:53
2.	"Beautiful" (Inst.)		Rocoberry		3:53
Total length:					7:46

Part 10

Released on September 29, 2020
No.	Title	Lyrics	Music	Artist	Length
1.	"Love Song" (노래해요 그대 듣도록)	Ji Hoon	Ahn Young-min	Gummy	3:10
2.	"Love Song" (Inst.)		Ahn Young-min		3:10
Total length:					6:20

Part 11

Released on October 6, 2020
No.	Title	Lyrics	Music	Artist	Length
1.	"Happy"	Ji Hoon	Gaemi; Midnight	Baekhyun (EXO)	3:53
2.	"Happy" (Inst.)		Gaemi; Midnight		3:53
Total length:					7:46

=== Chart performance ===
Title	Year	Peak positions	Remarks	Ref.
Title	Year	KOR	Remarks	Ref.
"Your Moonlight" (Chen)	2020	152	Part 3	
"Love Me" (Punch)	2020	119	Part 4	
"Kiss Me" (Taeyeon)	2020	59	Part 5	
"Dream" (Kim Na-young)	2020	110	Part 6	
"Midnight" (Heize & Punch)	2020	29	Part 8	
"Beautiful" (K.Will)	2020	110	Part 9	
"Love Song" (Gummy)	2020	154	Part 10	
"Happy" (Baekhyun)	2020	73	Part 11	

== Viewership ==
Do You Like Brahms? : South Korea viewers per episode (thousands)

Season	Episode number																Average
Season	1	2	3	4	5	6	7	8	9	10	11	12	13	14	15	16	Average
1	937	852	1075	976	1009	960	1040	1061	982	954	924	921	1006	932	985	1090	982

Source: Audience measurement performed nationwide by Nielsen Korea.

Average TV viewership ratings
Ep.	Part	Original broadcast date	Title	Average audience share (Nielsen Korea)	
Ep.	Part	Original broadcast date	Title	Nationwide	Seoul
1	1	August 31, 2020	Träumerei: Dream (트로이메라이 : 꿈)	4.2% (NR)	—N/a
1	2	August 31, 2020	Träumerei: Dream (트로이메라이 : 꿈)	5.3% (19th)	6.2% (15th)
2	1	September 1, 2020	Poco a Poco: Slowly, Gradually (포코 아 포코 : 서서히, 조금씩)	3.8% (NR)	—N/a
2	2	September 1, 2020	Poco a Poco: Slowly, Gradually (포코 아 포코 : 서서히, 조금씩)	5.0% (19th)	5.7% (18th)
3	1	September 7, 2020	Innig: Heartfelt (이니히 : 진심으로)	4.5% (NR)	—N/a
3	2	September 7, 2020	Innig: Heartfelt (이니히 : 진심으로)	5.6% (18th)	6.5% (15th)
4	1	September 8, 2020	Non Troppo: Not Too Much (논 트로포 : 지나치지 않게)	4.3% (NR)	—N/a
4	2	September 8, 2020	Non Troppo: Not Too Much (논 트로포 : 지나치지 않게)	5.3% (18th)	6.4% (15th)
5	1	September 14, 2020	Accelerando: Accelerating (아첼레란도 : 점점 빠르게)	4.5% (NR)	—N/a
5	2	September 14, 2020	Accelerando: Accelerating (아첼레란도 : 점점 빠르게)	5.8% (14th)	6.8% (9th)
6	1	September 15, 2020	Raffrenando: Controlling One's Pace (라프레난도: 속도를 억제하면서)	4.5% (NR)	—N/a
6	2	September 15, 2020	Raffrenando: Controlling One's Pace (라프레난도: 속도를 억제하면서)	5.6% (16th)	6.3% (11th)
7	1	September 21, 2020	Inquieto: Restless, Unstable (인키에토: 불안하게, 안정감 없이)	4.4% (NR)	—N/a
7	2	September 21, 2020	Inquieto: Restless, Unstable (인키에토: 불안하게, 안정감 없이)	5.8% (16th)	6.5% (11th)
8	1	September 22, 2020	Con Fermezza: Firmly, Clearly (콘 페르메차: 확실하게, 분명하게)	4.4% (NR)	—N/a
8	2	September 22, 2020	Con Fermezza: Firmly, Clearly (콘 페르메차: 확실하게, 분명하게)	6.3% (12th)	7.1% (6th)
9	1	September 28, 2020	Dolce: Sweetly (돌체: 달콤하게)	3.6% (NR)	—N/a
9	2	September 28, 2020	Dolce: Sweetly (돌체: 달콤하게)	5.5% (18th)	6.1% (14th)
10	1	September 29, 2020	Sotto Voce: In a Whisper (소토 보체: 속삭이는 목소리로)	3.6% (NR)	—N/a
10	2	September 29, 2020	Sotto Voce: In a Whisper (소토 보체: 속삭이는 목소리로)	5.5% (15th)	5.9% (9th)
11	1	October 5, 2020	Fermata: Hold, Pause (페르마타: 늘임표)	3.9% (NR)	—N/a
11	2	October 5, 2020	Fermata: Hold, Pause (페르마타: 늘임표)	5.2% (18th)	5.9% (17th)
12	1	October 6, 2020	Da Capo: From The Beginning (다 카포: 처음으로 되돌아가서)	4.1% (NR)	—N/a
12	2	October 6, 2020	Da Capo: From The Beginning (다 카포: 처음으로 되돌아가서)	5.4% (18th)	6.2% (14th)
13	1	October 12, 2020	Arpeggio: A Broken Chord (아르페지오: 펼침화음)	4.6% (NR)	—N/a
13	2	October 12, 2020	Arpeggio: A Broken Chord (아르페지오: 펼침화음)	6.0% (14th)	6.9% (9th)
14	1	October 13, 2020	A Tempo: Return To The Original Speed (아 템포: 본래의 속도로 돌아가서)	4.3% (NR)	—N/a
14	2	October 13, 2020	A Tempo: Return To The Original Speed (아 템포: 본래의 속도로 돌아가서)	5.7% (14th)	6.2% (12th)
15	1	October 19, 2020	General Pause, G.P.: Stop Abruptly and All Rest (게네랄 파우제: 돌연히 멈추고 모든 성부가 쉴 것)	3.9% (NR)	—N/a
15	2	October 19, 2020	General Pause, G.P.: Stop Abruptly and All Rest (게네랄 파우제: 돌연히 멈추고 모든 성부가 쉴 것)	5.6% (17th)	6.3% (13th)
16	1	October 20, 2020	Crescendo: Gradually Louder (크레센도: 점점 크게)	4.6% (NR)	—N/a
16	2	October 20, 2020	Crescendo: Gradually Louder (크레센도: 점점 크게)	6.0% (11th)	6.9% (9th)
Average				4.9%	— (Note: Due to some ratings not recorded, the exact average rating is unknown.)
The blue numbers represent the lowest ratings and the red numbers represent the highest ratings.; NR denotes that the series did not rank in the top 20 daily programs on that date.; N/A denotes that the rating is not known.

== Awards and nominations ==
Year	Award	Category	Nominee	Result	Ref.
2020	SBS Drama Awards	Top Excellence Award, Actress in a Miniseries Fantasy/Romance Drama	Park Eun-bin	Won	
2020	SBS Drama Awards	Excellence Award, Actor in a Miniseries Fantasy/Romance Drama	Kim Min-jae	Won	
2020	SBS Drama Awards	Best New Actor	Kim Sung-cheol	Nominated	
2020	SBS Drama Awards	Best New Actress	Park Ji-hyun	Nominated	
2020	SBS Drama Awards	Best Couple Award	Park Eun-bin and Kim Min-jae	Won	
