= Bae Da-bin =

South Korean actress (born 1993)

- Born: 24 December 1993 (age 32); South Korea
- Occupations: Actress; model
- Years active: 2013–present

Korean name
- Hangul: 배다빈
- RR: Bae Dabin
- MR: Pae Tabin

Bae Da-bin (Korean: 배다빈; born on 24 December 1993) is a South Korean actress. She is known for her roles in Gangnam Beauty (2018) and Do You Like Brahms? (2020). She has acted in two films: Beautiful Voice (2019) and Pipeline (2021). In 2021 she appeared in Netflix series Love Alarm 2. In 2022, she appeared in the KBS weekend drama It's Beautiful Now as main lead.

== Career ==
Bae Da-bin started her career as a model. She first appeared in the SBS 2018 TV series Should We Kiss First?. She gained recognition from her supporting role in JTBC's Gangnam Beauty and MBC's Less Than Evil (2018). She then appeared in major roles in tvN's Arthdal Chronicles (2019) SBS's Do You Like Brahms? (2020) and Netflix original Love Alarm season 2 in 2021. She was also cast in the film Pipeline (2021).

In 2022 she was cast in KBS weekend drama It's Beautiful Now as main lead, which was premiered on April 2.

== Personal life ==
Bae spent her formative years in New Zealand as she moved there when she was in the fifth grade. She returned to Korea at the age of twenty-one, and worked as a part-timer in the broadcasting industry. Her younger brother is Bae Ho-young, who is currently a member of the boy group Verivery.

== Filmography ==
=== Films ===
Year	Title	Role	Ref.
2019	Beautiful Voice	Jessica	
2021	Pipeline	Monitor counter	

=== Television series ===
Year	Title	Role	Notes	Ref.
2018	Should We Kiss First?	Son I-deun		
2018	Queen of Mystery 2	Kim Han-na		
2018	My ID Is Gangnam Beauty	Kwon Yoon-byul		
2018	Less Than Evil	Sin Ga-yeong		
2019	Arthdal Chronicles	Mi Roo-sol	Season 1	
2020	Do You Like Brahms?	Kang Min-sung		
2020	More Than Friends	Kwon Yoo-ra		
2022	It's Beautiful Now	Hyeon Mi-rae		

=== Web series ===
Year	Title	Role	Notes	Ref.
2021	Love Alarm	Lee Wei-ju	Season 2	
2023	Han River Police	Do Na-hee		

== Accolades ==
Award ceremony	Year	Category	Nominee	Result	Ref.
KBS Drama Awards	2022	Best Couple Award	Bae Da-bin with Yoon Shi-yoon; It's Beautiful Now	Won	
KBS Drama Awards	2022	Best New Actress	It's Beautiful Now	Nominated	

=== Listicles ===
Name of publisher, year listed, name of listicle, and placement
Publisher	Year	List	Rank	Ref.
Forbes	2023	Korea Power Celebrity 40	24th	
