= It's Beautiful Now =

2022 South Korean television series

- Promotional poster
- Also known as: Now Is Beautiful; It's Beautiful Right Now
- Hangul: 현재는 아름다워
- Hanja: 現在는 아름다워
- RR: Hyeonjaeneun areumdawo
- MR: Hyŏnjaenŭn arŭmdawŏ
- Genre: Family drama Melodrama
- Written by: Ha Myeong-hee
- Directed by: Kim Seong-geun
- Starring: Yoon Shi-yoon; Bae Da-bin; Oh Min-suk; Shin Dong-mi; Seo Bum-june; Choi Ye-bin
- Music by: Lee Chang-hee
- Country of origin: South Korea
- Original language: Korean
- No. of episodes: 50

Production
- Executive producer: Ki Min-soo (KBS)
- Producers: Jeong Seung-sun; Oh Chang-mok
- Camera setup: Single-camera
- Running time: 70 minutes
- Production company: SLL; Drama House Studios; Zium Content

Original release
- Network: KBS2
- Release: April 2 – September 18, 2022

It's Beautiful Now (Korean: 현재는 아름다워) is a 2022 South Korean television series starring Yoon Shi-yoon, Bae Da-bin, Oh Min-suk, Shin Dong-mi, Seo Bum-june, and Choi Ye-bin. Directed by Kim Seong-geun, the weekend drama depicts the reality of the current generation that are reluctant to get married and have a family. It premiered on KBS2 on April 2, 2022 and aired every Saturday and Sunday at 19:55 (KST) till September 18, 2022.

== Synopsis ==
The series depicts the story of the Lee family, whose head is Lee Kyung-cheol (Park In-hwan), the grandfather. His son, Lee Min-ho (Park Sang-won), and his wife, Han Kyung-ae (Kim Hye-ok), have 3 sons. The sons are reluctant to marry, so the elders declare that they would give an apartment to the son who marries within 6 months.

== Cast and characters ==
=== Main ===
- Yoon Shi-yoon as Lee Hyun-jae

36 years old, a partner lawyer in law firm Haejun, specializing in family (divorce/inheritance) law and criminal law. He is a lawyer with a high win rate due to his logical eloquence.

- Bae Da-bin as Hyun Mi-rae

31 years old, the eldest daughter, a VIP personal shopper. She asks for an annulment of marriage by saying that she was fraudulently married.

- Oh Min-suk as Lee Yun-jae

39 years old, a dentist.

- Shin Dong-mi as Shin Hae-jun

41 years old, CEO of law firm Haejun, divorce attorney. She has a crush on Yun-jae.

- Seo Bum-june as Lee Soo-jae

27 years old, a 7th grade public exam preparation student. He is the youngest brother with strong positive narcissism, and has a part-time job of loading and unloading at a parcel delivery service. He meets Na Yu-na at his part time job.

- Choi Ye-bin as Na Yu-na

25 years old, she is the eldest of two sons and one daughter. She dreams of becoming a pastry chef. She works hard at a bakery academy, and also works part-time as a courier.

=== Lee family ===
- Park In-hwan as Lee Kyeong-cheol
  - Ji Seung-hyun as young Lee Kyeong-cheol

79 years old, head of Igane, Min-ho's father. He worked hard as a fresh produce seller.

- Park Sang-won as Lee Min-ho

60 years old, Lee Kyeong-cheol's adopted son, Kyung-ae's husband, vice-principal of a middle school, father of 3 sons.

- Kim Hye-ok as Han Kyung-ae

60 years old, Min-ho's wife, mother of 3 sons.

==== Lee extended family ====
- Sunwoo Yong-nyeo as Lee Kyung-soon

76 years old, Lee Kyeong-cheol's younger sister, who immigrated to Atlanta, United States but went bankrupt and came back to live with her brother.

- Jung Heung-chae as Choi Man-ri

58 years old, Lee Kyung-soon's son.

- Kim Ye-ryeong as Yoo Hye-yeong

55 years old, Choi Man-ri's wife.

- Cha Yeop as Choi Seong-soo

35 years old, law firm manager in Hae-jun's law firm, Lee Hyun-jae's cousin.

- Hyun Jyu-ni as Lee So-ra

35 years old, wife of Choi Seong-soo. She is a nursing assistant at Lee Yoon-jae's dental clinic. Lee So-ra married at an age of 20, and has three children.

- Kim Hyo-kyung as Choi Ha-neul

12 years old, the eldest daughter of Seong-soo and So-ra.

- Im Ye-jin as Choi Ba-da

10 years old, the second daughter of Seong-soo and So-ra.

- Kim So-min as Choi Hae

8 years old, the youngest son of Seong-soo and So-ra.

=== Hyun family ===
- Ban Hyo-jung as Yoon Jung-ja

80 years old, a successful restaurateur, everything she touches turns into money.

- Byun Woo-min as Hyun Jin-heon

57 years old, Yoon Jung-ja's son. He owns a Gimbap franchise and is in love with his wife.

- Park Ji-young as Jin Su-jeong

53 years old, Hyun Jin-heon's wife. She lived a comfortable life and gave birth to a daughter and a son (Hyun Mi-rae and Hyun Jeong-hoo).

- Kim Kang-min as Hyun Jeong-hoo

27 years old, Hyun Mi-rae's younger brother and Head of Bong Food headquarters. He has crush on Na Yu-na.

=== Others ===
- Hong Yo-seob as Na Seok-man, Yu-na's father
- Song Ok-sook as Sok Sook-suk, Yu-na's mother
- Lee Joo-shil as Jung Mi-young

77 years old, Su-jeong's mother.

- Choi Su-rin as Jin-ju

Su-jeong's sister-in-law.

- Kwak Hee-ju as Na Wan-ju

Na Yu-na's younger brother.

- Ahn Sang-eun as Satbyul

Macaron shop owner and Yu-na.

=== Special appearances ===
- Bae Woo-hee as Yeon Na-young
- Lee Hyun-jin as Park Jun-hyung

32 years old, party to the marriage annulment lawsuit.

- Kim Sun-woong as Bong Food worker
- Woo Hyun as Judiciary
- Kim Ji-min as The plaintiff filed for divorce.
- Bae Geu-rin as So Young-eun

36 years old, ex-girlfriend of Hyun-jae. After breaking up with Lee Hyun-jae, she married the son of a semi-millionaire and followed each other's rules. 10 years later, the two reunite as lawyers and divorce clients.

- Yoon Bok-in as VIP client
- Lee Jung-hyuk as Jaehyun, So Young-eun's ex-husband.
- Nam Bo-ra as Kim Yu-jin, currently recommended playwrights.

== Production ==
In August, it was reported that Yoon Shi-yoon had been offered a role in the series, and he was considering it positively. Director Kim Seong-geun directed the KBS weekend drama after the 2006 weekend TV series Thank You, My Life and the 2009 daily drama Jolly Widows. Park In-hwan and Shin Dong-mi are working together after the 2019 TV series Liver or Die. Park In-hwan last appeared in the KBS weekend drama Believe in Love in 2011. Kim Hye-ok is appearing in a KBS weekend drama for the fourth time. Previously, she joined in My Too Perfect Sons (2009), Seoyoung, My Daughter (2012) and My Golden Life (2017) with KBS.

On March 11, photos from script reading site were released revealing the site. Production presentation of the series was given by Oh Min-seok, Shin Dong-mi, Yoon Si-yoon, Bae Da-bin, Seo Bum-june, and Choi Ye-bin on April 1, 2022.

== Original soundtrack ==
It's Beautiful Now

Soundtrack album by Various
- Released: 2022
- Genre: Soundtrack
- Languages: Korean; English
- Labels: Kakao Entertainment; Plus Media; SLL

=== Part 1 ===
Released on April 24, 2022
No.	Title	Lyrics	Music	Artist	Length
1.	"A Timid Man" (소심한 남자)	Liger	Lee Chang-hee	Ulala Session	3:33
2.	"A Timid Man" (소심한 남자; Inst.)		Lee Chang-hee		3:33
Total length:					7:06

=== Part 2 ===
Released on May 1, 2022
No.	Title	Lyrics	Music	Artist	Length
1.	"It's Love" (사랑인거야)	6uoy	6uoy; Ragoon	Lee Hae-in	3:10
2.	"It's Love" (사랑인거야; Inst.)		6uoy; Ragoon		3:10
Total length:					6:20

=== Part 3 ===
Released on May 8, 2022
No.	Title	Lyrics	Music	Artist	Length
1.	"You Were So Precious" (참 소중했었어)	Rhino	Rhino, Cheol-hoon Choi	Jin Min-ho	4:00
2.	"You Were So Precious" (Inst.)		Rhino, Cheol-hoon Choi		4:00

=== Part 4 ===
Released on May 8, 2022
No.	Title	Lyrics	Music	Artist	Length
1.	"I Hope" (바래)	Kang Eun-kyung	Hong Jin-young	Sohyang	3:19
2.	"I Hope" (Inst.)		Hong Jin-young		3:19

=== Part 5 ===
Released on May 22, 2022
No.	Title	Lyrics	Music	Artist	Length
1.	"Thank You" (고마워)	Coma, Kim Woo-sang	Coma, Kim Woo-sang	Kim Hyung-joong	3:42
2.	"Thank You" (Inst.)				3:42

=== Part 6 ===
Released on June 5, 2022
No.	Title	Lyrics	Music	Artist	Length
1.	"As We Are" (우리 이대로)	Cha So-yeon, Brother Ho	Cha So-yeon	Cha So-yeon, Brother Ho	4:05
2.	"As We Are" (Inst.)				4:05

=== Part 7 ===
Released on June 12, 2022
No.	Title	Lyrics	Music	Artist	Length
1.	"When The Day I Miss You Again Comes" (또 그리운 그날이 오면)	Undefeated, Jamie	Jamie and Lee Ju-yong	Sookhee	3:31
2.	"When The Day I Miss You Again Comes" (Inst.)				3:31

=== Part 8 ===
Released on June 19, 2022
No.	Title	Lyrics	Music	Artist	Length
1.	"Going Home"	Kang Woo-kyung	Jeong Song-am	Shim Gyu-sun (Lucia)	3:32
2.	"Going Home" (Inst.)				3:32

=== Part 9 ===
Released on June 26, 2022
No.	Title	Lyrics	Music	Artist	Length
1.	"Beautiful Inside"	Major Leaguer, Ahn Ye-seul	Major Leaguer, Buzzer Beater	Hello Ga-Young	3:41
2.	"Beautiful Inside" (Inst.)				3:41

=== Part 10 ===
Released on July 3, 2022
No.	Title	Lyrics	Music	Artist	Length
1.	"It Seeps In" (스며드나봐)	Coma	Coma	Yeo Eun	3:48
2.	"It Seeps In" (Inst.)				3:48

=== Part 11 ===
Released on July 10, 2022
No.	Title	Lyrics	Music	Artist	Length
1.	"How Much It Hurts To Forget" (얼마나 아파야 잊을까요)	Turns out, Coma	Turns out, Coma	Ali (ALi)	3:51
2.	"How Much It Hurts To Forget" (Inst.)				3:51

=== Part 12 ===
Released on July 17, 2022
No.	Title	Lyrics	Music	Artist	Length
1.	"Everyone Lives That Way" (모두가 그렇게 살아)	Bad Boss	Bad Boss	Jeon Sang-geun	3:02
2.	"Everyone Lives That Way" (Inst.)				3:02

=== Part 13 ===
Released on July 24, 2022
No.	Title	Lyrics	Music	Artist	Length
1.	"It's All Just Lies" (다 거짓말일 뿐인걸)	Bad Boss, Kaiser	Bad Boss, Kaiser	Shin Ye-young	3:42
2.	"It's All Just Lies" (Inst.)				3:42

=== Part 14 ===
Released on July 31, 2022
No.	Title	Lyrics	Music	Artist	Length
1.	"It Hurts To Love You" (사랑하는데 아프죠)	Lee Joo-yong	Lee Joo-yong	J sera	3:48
2.	"It Hurts To Love You" (Inst.)				3:48

=== Part 15 ===
Released on August 7, 2022
No.	Title	Lyrics	Music	Artist	Length
1.	"Hasty Love and Hasty Parting" (섣부른 사랑도 성급한 이별도)	Byung-shik Ko (Major Leaguer)	Byung-shik Ko (Major Leaguer), Lee Sung-sung	Na Tae-joo	3:51
2.	"Hasty Love and Hasty Parting" (Inst.)				3:51

=== Part 16 ===
Released on August 21, 2022
No.	Title	Lyrics	Music	Artist	Length
1.	"I Want To Love When I Can Love" (사랑할 수 있을 때, 사랑하고 싶어요)	Coma	Turns out, I'm in a coma	Shinyu	3:24
2.	"I Want To Love When I Can Love" (Inst.)				3:24

=== Part 17 ===
Released on August 28, 2022
No.	Title	Lyrics	Music	Artist	Length
1.	"It Came Alive" (살아지더라)	BadBosS, Kaiser	BadBosS, Kaiser	Ban Kwang-ok	3:43
2.	"It Came Alive" (Inst.)				3:43

=== Part 18 ===
Released on September 4, 2022
No.	Title	Lyrics	Music	Artist	Length
1.	"I Wouldn't Have Started" (시작하지 않았을 텐데)	Undefeated, Lydia	Undefeated, Lydia, Lee Ju-yong	Han Kyung-il	3:40
2.	"I Wouldn't Have Started" (Inst.)				3:40

=== Part 19 ===
Released on September 11, 2022
No.	Title	Lyrics	Music	Artist	Length
1.	"Is It All Lies" (다 거짓인가요)	Undefeated, Lydia	Undefeated, Lydia, Lee Ju-yong	RAN	3:40
2.	"Is It All Lies" (Inst.)				3:40

== Release and reception ==
It's Beautiful Now began its first broadcast on KBS2 on April 2, 2022, and aired every Saturday and Sunday at 20:00 (KST). As per Nielsen Korea, the 50th episode of the series logged 29.4% nationwide ratings. It also attracted 5.3 million viewers and as of September 18, 2022, it was placed at 12th rank among Top 50 series per nationwide viewers in Korea.

== Viewership ==
It's Beautiful Now : South Korea viewers per episode (millions)

Episodes	Episode number									
Episodes	1	2	3	4	5	6	7	8	9	10
Ep. 1–10	4.182	4.267	3.759	4.429	3.617	4.270	3.694	4.210	3.654	4.327
Ep. 11–20	3.622	4.364	3.880	4.185	3.602	3.947	3.496	4.092	3.748	4.114
Ep. 21–30	3.705	4.163	3.706	4.315	3.627	4.428	3.651	4.183	3.671	4.453
Ep. 31–40	3.903	4.718	4.101	4.630	4.196	4.484	4.481	4.928	4.415	4.896
Ep. 41–50	4.522	5.159	4.253	4.921	4.571	5.287	3.970	4.587	4.518	5.300

Source: Audience measurement performed nationwide by Nielsen Korea.

Ep.	Original broadcast date	Average audience share		
Ep.	Original broadcast date	Nielsen Korea		TNmS
Ep.	Original broadcast date	Nationwide	Seoul	Nationwide
1	April 2, 2022	24.5% (1st)	22.8% (1st)	N/A
2	April 3, 2022	24.6% (1st)	23.4% (1st)	20.7% (1st)
3	April 9, 2022	22.8% (1st)	20.7% (1st)	N/A
4	April 10, 2022	25.3% (1st)	24.2% (1st)	N/A
5	April 16, 2022	21.0% (1st)	19.6% (1st)	17.8% (1st)
6	April 17, 2022	24.1% (1st)	22.7% (1st)	21.3% (1st)
7	April 23, 2022	22.2% (1st)	20.6% (1st)	19.5% (1st)
8	April 24, 2022	24.4% (1st)	22.9% (1st)	21.1% (1st)
9	April 30, 2022	22.3% (1st)	20.7% (1st)	16.8% (1st)
10	May 1, 2022	25.0% (1st)	23.8% (1st)	19.2% (1st)
11	May 7, 2022	20.7% (1st)	19.4% (1st)	16.3% (1st)
12	May 8, 2022	24.3% (1st)	23.1% (1st)	20.6% (1st)
13	May 14, 2022	23.1% (1st)	22.0% (1st)	18.5% (1st)
14	May 15, 2022	23.9% (1st)	22.7% (1st)	19.6% (1st)
15	May 21, 2022	20.9% (1st)	19.3% (1st)	N/A
16	May 22, 2022	22.2% (1st)	20.7% (1st)	18.8% (1st)
17	May 28, 2022	20.8% (1st)	18.9% (1st)	17.7% (1st)
18	May 29, 2022	23.8% (1st)	22.2% (1st)	19.4% (1st)
19	June 4, 2022	21.2% (1st)	20.2% (1st)	16.1% (1st)
20	June 5, 2022	23.8% (1st)	22.3% (1st)	18.7% (1st)
21	June 11, 2022	21.7% (1st)	20.7% (1st)	17.0% (1st)
22	June 12, 2022	24.0% (1st)	22.5% (1st)	20.1% (1st)
23	June 18, 2022	21.1% (1st)	19.0% (1st)	17.1% (1st)
24	June 19, 2022	25.0% (1st)	23.1% (1st)	20.2% (1st)
25	June 25, 2022	21.7% (1st)	20.0% (1st)	N/A
26	June 26, 2022	25.0% (1st)	23.1% (1st)	21.4% (1st)
27	July 2, 2022	20.5% (1st)	18.6% (1st)	17.6% (1st)
28	July 3, 2022	23.1% (1st)	20.9% (1st)	19.0% (1st)
29	July 9, 2022	21.3% (1st)	19.7% (1st)	18.2% (1st)
30	July 10, 2022	24.2% (1st)	22.2% (1st)	20.6% (1st)
31	July 16, 2022	21.6% (1st)	19.8% (1st)	19.3% (1st)
32	July 17, 2022	26.0% (1st)	23.3% (1st)	22.1% (1st)
33	July 23, 2022	23.7% (1st)	21.8% (1st)	20.5% (1st)
34	July 24, 2022	25.7% (1st)	23.1% (1st)	23.0% (1st)
35	July 30, 2022	24.0% (1st)	22.2% (1st)	19.2% (1st)
36	July 31, 2022	26.2% (1st)	23.9% (1st)	22.5% (1st)
37	August 6, 2022	25.6% (1st)	23.2% (1st)	N/A
38	August 7, 2022	27.4% (1st)	24.7% (1st)	N/A
39	August 13, 2022	25.0% (1st)	22.4% (1st)	21.2% (1st)
40	August 14, 2022	27.3% (1st)	25.2% (1st)	21.7% (1st)
41	August 20, 2022	26.5% (1st)	24.2% (1st)	21.3% (1st)
42	August 21, 2022	28.8% (1st)	26.0% (1st)	23.4% (1st)
43	August 27, 2022	25.2% (1st)	23.3% (1st)	20.7% (1st)
44	August 28, 2022	28.2% (1st)	25.2% (1st)	24.4% (1st)
45	September 3, 2022	26.8% (1st)	24.2% (1st)	21.3% (1st)
46	September 4, 2022	28.9% (1st)	25.7% (1st)	23.6% (1st)
47	September 10, 2022	22.1% (1st)	19.9% (1st)	17.9% (1st)
48	September 11, 2022	26.2% (1st)	23.4% (1st)	21.7% (1st)
49	September 17, 2022	26.4% (1st)	24.8% (1st)	21.7% (1st)
50	September 18, 2022	29.4% (1st)	26.4% (1st)	24.2% (1st)
Average		24.2%	22.3%	— (Note: Due to some ratings not recorded, the exact average rating is unknown.)
In the table above, the blue numbers represent the lowest ratings and the red numbers represent the highest ratings.; N/A denotes ratings that were not released.

== Accolades ==
Award ceremony	Year	Category	Nominee	Result	Ref.
APAN Star Awards	2022	Top Excellence Award, Actor in a Serial Drama	Yoon Shi-yoon	Nominated	
APAN Star Awards	2022	Excellence Award, Actor in a Serial Drama	Oh Min-suk	Nominated	
APAN Star Awards	2022	Excellence Award, Actress in a Serial Drama	Shin Dong-mi	Nominated	
Asia Artist Awards	2022	Rookie Of the Year Award – Actor	Seo Bum-june	Won	
KBS Drama Awards	2022	Best Young Actor	Kim So-min	Nominated	
KBS Drama Awards	2022	Best Young Actress	Kim Hyo-kyung	Nominated	
KBS Drama Awards	2022	Best Couple Award	Bae Da-bin with Yoon Shi-yoon	Won	
KBS Drama Awards	2022	Excellence Award, Actor in a Serial Drama	Yoon Shi-yoon	Won	
KBS Drama Awards	2022	Excellence Award, Actor in a Serial Drama	Park In-hwan	Nominated	
KBS Drama Awards	2022	Excellence Award, Actress in a Serial Drama	Park Ji-young	Won	
KBS Drama Awards	2022	Best Supporting Actor	Oh Min-suk	Nominated	
KBS Drama Awards	2022	Best Supporting Actress	Shin Dong-mi	Nominated	
KBS Drama Awards	2022	Best New Actress	Bae Da-bin	Nominated	
