= Pinocchio (2014 TV series) =

South Korean television series

- Promotional poster
- Genre: Romance; Drama; Comedy; Family
- Written by: Park Hye-ryun
- Directed by: Jo Soo-won; Shin Seung-woo
- Starring: Lee Jong-suk; Park Shin-hye; Kim Young-kwang; Lee Yu-bi
- Opening theme: "Non-Fiction" by Every Single Day
- Country of origin: South Korea
- Original language: Korean
- No. of episodes: 20

Production
- Executive producer: Choi Moon-suk
- Producer: Park Chang-yong
- Production company: iHQ

Original release
- Network: Seoul Broadcasting System
- Release: 12 November 2014 – 15 January 2015

Pinocchio (Korean: 피노키오) is a 2014–2015 South Korean television series starring Lee Jong-suk, Park Shin-hye, Kim Young-kwang, and Lee Yu-bi. With 20 episodes, the show aired on SBS from 12 November 2014 to 15 January 2015.

In China, the online broadcasting rights were sold at a record price of US$280,000 per episode, making it the most expensive Korean drama ever to be sold in China at the time. As of 23 January 2015, it has an accumulated view of 1 billion on Chinese video-sharing website Youku.

== Synopsis ==
In the year 2000, Ki Ha-myung is leading a happy life with his parents and elder brother, Jae-myung, until his father, Ki Ho-sang, the captain of a firefighting squad, dies in a factory explosion during a rescue attempt, along with several of his men. Ho-sang's body initially goes missing, and the media sensationalizes the case by scapegoating him. In a battle for ratings, cold and calculating MSC reporter Song Cha-Ok alleges that Ho-sang survived the blast and is currently in hiding because he was responsible for the deaths of his men. This causes the Ki family to become outcasts in their neighborhood and objects of national scorn. Ki Ho-sang's wife kills herself and Ha-myung by jumping off a cliff, and the elder son, Jae-myung, blames their deaths on the media, particularly Cha-ok.

But Ha-myung is alive, having been rescued from the water by Choi Gong-pil, a kind elderly man who lives on Hyangri Island. Gong-pil, who may either have Alzheimer's disease or trauma-induced memory loss, believes that Ha-myung is his older son Choi Dal-po, a simpleton who died thirty years earlier. Ha-myung embraces the deception and treats Gong-pil as his father. Gong-pil officially adopts Ha-myung, now named Dal-po, and places him in the family register as his eldest son. Five months later, when Gong-pil's younger son, Choi Dal-pyung, moves to the island with his daughter, Choi In-ha, they are flabbergasted to be told by Gong-pil to address a mere boy as their "older brother" and "uncle", respectively. Choi In-ha has "Pinocchio syndrome", which causes her to hiccup whenever she tells a lie. She idolizes her mother and hates living on the island after her parents' divorce. The fledgling friendship between Dal-po and In-ha is dashed, however, when he learns that In-ha's mother is none other than Song Cha-ok.

Five years later, In-ha and Dal-po are seniors and classmates at their small-town high school. Dal-po, who is a genius, pretends to be dumb and gets all zeroes in his test scores to keep up the deception in front of Choi Gong-pil. With his last-place class standing and scruffy, country bumpkin hair, Dal-po is friendless at school, while In-ha is the most popular girl. Dal-po secretly likes In-ha, and he is forced to join a televised quiz show at first to prevent Ahn Chan Soo, who has a crush on In-ha, from confessing to her on national TV. At the TV studio, Dal-po runs into the show producer, Hwang Gyo-dong, who had been a YGN reporter and one of Cha-ok's rivals but changed careers after what happened to the Ki family. After seeing Dal-po on TV, and despite knowing that her Pinocchio syndrome limits her career choices, In-ha decides to become a journalist.

In 2013, the Choi family has moved back to the city. In-ha has spent the last three years after college studying to become a reporter but continuously fails her job interviews. On the other hand, due to the poverty-stricken condition of the Choi family, Dal-po is forced to work as a taxi driver to make ends meet. Cha-ok, who hasn't seen her daughter in a decade and is now MSC's nightly news anchor and section chief, fails In-ha at her final interview, saying a reporter with Pinocchio syndrome would be useless. Seeing how hurt In-ha is at her mother's rejection, Dal-po becomes determined to help her achieve her dream and announces that he wants to become a reporter as well. A month later, In-ha and Dal-po apply at YGN's "blind" audition for broadcast news reporters, but only Dal-po gets hired. When confronted by Gyo-dong, now chief of YGN's news desk, Dal-po confesses his real identity as well as his real motive for taking the job: he wants to find his older brother, Jae-myung, and clear their father's name. But what he doesn't know is that Jae-myung has taken revenge on the factory workers who lied about their father by killing all of them and framing his last victim for the murders by hiding his body and making it seem like he is on the run. Meanwhile, with MSC's credibility rating at an all-time low, Cha-ok hires In-ha, using her Pinocchio syndrome in a publicity stunt. Thus, Dal-po and In-ha become rookies at rival networks, and among their colleagues are Seo Beom-jo, who comes from a rich, sheltered chaebol background and has a connection to In-ha via a wrong cellphone number, and Yoon Yoo-rae, once a sasaeng fan who now uses those obsessive and determined traits in her new job.

Later in her line of work, In-ha discovers Choi Dal-po's real identity and is disgusted by what her mother Cha-ok did to his family during the fire accident. In a lecture held by Cha-ok, In-ha stands against her and in the process, reveals to Jae-myung that his brother is alive. Together, they try to bring Cha-ok down through their honest news reporting, all the while uncovering a bigger conspiracy in the news industry.

== Cast and characters ==
=== Main ===
- Lee Jong-suk as Choi Dal-po/Ki Ha-myung
  - Nam Da-reum as young Dal-po/Ki Ha-myung

A young man whose family is torn apart by a tragedy, who assumes a different identity and attempts to rebuild his life.

- Park Shin-hye as Choi In-ha
  - Roh Jeong-eui as young In-ha

A young woman who suffers from a condition that causes her to hiccup whenever she tells a lie. She goes on to become a reporter, and her friendship with Choi Dal-po/Ki Ha-myung takes her life in unexpected directions.

- Kim Young-kwang as Seo Beom-jo

A young reporter who becomes entwined in the lives of In-ha, her mother, and the intrigues of journalism.

- Lee Yu-bi as Yoon Yoo-rae

A past sasaeng fan who decides to become a reporter.

=== Supporting ===
==== MSC newsroom ====
- Jin Kyung as Song Cha-ok

In-ha's estranged mother. A cold, merciless woman who chose to abandon her family for her career. She eventually became one of the best news anchors in the industry.

- Kim Kwang-kyu as Kim Gong-joo

Chief of the MSC news desk.

- Kim Young-hoon as Lee Il-joo
- Im Byung-ki as Yeon Doo-young
- Yoon Seo-hyun as Lee Joo-ho
- Lee Seung-ho as Jae Dae-gook

==== YGN newsroom ====
- Lee Pil-mo as Hwang Gyo-dong

Chief of the YGN news desk. Gyo-dong works with the motto "the truth can change the world". He looks out for Dal-po and tries to discreetly help him in proving his family's innocence.

- Min Sung-wook as Jang Hyun-kyu
- Kang Shin-il as Lee Young-tak
- Jo Deok-hyun as Jo Won-gu
- Choo Soo-hyun as Im Jae-hwan

==== Family ====
- Jung In-gi as Ki Ho-sang, Ha-myung's father
- Jang Young-nam as Ha-myung's mother
- Yoon Kyun-sang as Ki Jae-myung, Ha-myung's older brother
  - Shin Jae-ha as young Jae-myung
- Byun Hee-bong as Choi Gong-pil, In-ha's grandfather
- Shin Jung-geun as Choi Dal-pyung, In-ha's father. A former banker, he was fired from his job after accusing his superior of illegal lending.
- Kim Hae-sook as Park Rosa

A wealthy CEO who owns several malls and who seems to be a doting mother who spoils her son, Beom-jo. Rosa hides a darker side, however, having conspired with Song Cha-ok to deliberately twist the news in order to protect her interests.

=== Extended ===
- Lee Joo-seung as Ahn Chan-soo, a police officer who has had a crush on In-ha since high school
- Kim Min-young as Song Yeong-joo
- Park Soo-young as Jung Gi-bong
- Yoon Jin-young as Firefighter
- Yeom Dong-hyun as Factory supervisor
- Choi Jong-hoon as Factory worker
- Kim Young-joon as Neighborhood boy with Pinocchio syndrome
- Ahn Sun-young as Broadcast station writer
- Woo Hyun as Dal-po's homeroom teacher
- Im Do-yoon as Go Ji-hee
- Lee Jung-soo as Lost hiker
- Hong Hyun-hee as Teacher Yoon
- Lee Seung-woo as Ahn Joon-ki, Chan-soo's eldest child

=== Special appearances ===
- Im Sung-han as Quiz show host (eps. 1–2)
- Jang Gwang as High school principal (ep. 2)
- Jung Woong-in as Min Joon-gook (ep. 2)
- Jang Hang-jun as Director (ep. 2)
- Kim Min-jung as Dal-po's blind date prospect (photo, ep. 3)
- Lee Bo-young as Hye-sung car navigation (voice, ep. 3)
- Kim Hee-chul as Yoo-rae's cellphone wallpaper (photo, ep. 8)
- Bae Suzy as Beom-jo's blind date prospect (photo, ep. 12)
- Yoon Sang-hyun as Cha Gwan-woo, Jae-myung's public defender (ep. 12)
- Lee Joon as Fama, idol singer investigated for propofol use (ep. 19)
- Kangnam as Cha-ok's student (ep. 20)
- Shin Jae-ha as himself (ep. 20)
- Oh Seung-ah as MSC news reporter interviewer

== Production ==
The series reunited actors Lee Jong-suk and Kim Hae-sook with screenwriter Park Hye-ryun and television director Jo Soo-won, who had collaborated a year before on I Can Hear Your Voice.

== Original soundtrack ==
English titles are adapted from iTunes and credits from Naver Music.

Pinocchio: Original Soundtrack

Soundtrack album by Various Artists
- Released: 2014
- Genres: K-pop, pop, R&B, soundtrack
- Languages: Korean, English
- Labels: CJ E&M, Gazi Contents

=== Part 1 ===
Released on 20 November 2014
No.	Title	Lyrics	Music	Artist	Length
1.	"First Love" (첫사랑)	Jihoon, Tiger JK, Bizzy	Conan	Tiger JK featuring Punch	3:20
2.	"First Love" (Inst.)		Conan		3:20
Total length:					6:40

=== Part 2 ===
Released on 27 November 2014
No.	Title	Lyrics	Music	Artist	Length
1.	"Pinocchio" (피노키오)	Jihoon, Gu Ji-an	Rocoberry	Roy Kim	3:33
2.	"Pinocchio" (Inst.)		Rocoberry		3:33
Total length:					6:66

=== Part 3 ===
Released on 4 December 2014
No.	Title	Lyrics	Music	Artist	Length
1.	"Non Fiction"	Moon Sung-nam	Moon Sung-nam, Jung Jae-woo	Every Single Day	3:33
2.	"Challenge"		Moon Sung-nam		3:26
3.	"Story"		Moon Sung-nam		3:22
Total length:					9:51

=== Part 4 ===
Released on 11 December 2014
No.	Title	Lyrics	Music	Artist	Length
1.	"Love Is Like Snow" (사랑은 눈처럼)	Park Shin-won, Conan, Rocoberry	Rocoberry	Park Shin-hye	3:19
2.	"Love Is Like Snow" (Inst.)		Rocoberry		3:19
Total length:					6:38

=== Part 5 ===
Released on 18 December 2014
No.	Title	Lyrics	Music	Artist	Length
1.	"The Only Person" (하나뿐인 사람)	Rocoberry	Rocoberry	K.Will	3:20
2.	"The Only Person" (Inst.)		Rocoberry		3:20
Total length:					6:40

=== Part 6 ===
Released on 24 December 2014
No.	Title	Lyrics	Music	Artist	Length
1.	"Kiss Me" (첫사랑)	Jihoon	Jihoon, Roco	Zion.T	3:09
2.	"Kiss Me" (Inst.)		Rocoberry		3:09
Total length:					6:18

=== Part 7 ===
Released on 31 December 2014
No.	Title	Lyrics	Music	Artist	Length
1.	"Passionate to Me" (뜨겁게 나를)	Jihoon	Jihoon	Younha	3:49
2.	"Passionate to Me" (Inst.)		Jihoon		3:49
Total length:					7:48

=== Part 8 ===
Released on 8 January 2015
No.	Title	Lyrics	Music	Artist	Length
1.	"You Are the One" (그대 하나로)	Jihoon	Rocoberry	Kim Bo Kyung	3:35
2.	"You Are the One" (Inst.)		Rocoberry		3:35
Total length:					7:30

=== Part 9 ===
Released on 15 January 2015
No.	Title	Lyrics	Music	Artist	Length
1.	"Dreaming a Dream" (꿈을 꾸다)	Park Shin-won, Conan, Rocoberry	Rocoberry	Park Shin-hye	3:20
2.	"Dreaming a Dream" (Inst.)		Rocoberry		3:20
Total length:					6:40

Disc 2:
No.	Title	Artist	Length
1.	"Tears in the Crowd (Strings)"	Various Artists	4:27
2.	"Pino Dream (Strings)"	Various Artists	3:52
3.	"Calm and Passion"	Various Artists	2:56
4.	"Mysteric Them"	Various Artists	2:40

== Ratings ==
Ep.	Broadcast date	Episode title (Note: Each of the episode titles is excerpted from well-known works of fiction, such as fairy tales, fables, novels, and plays.)	Average audience share			
Ep.	Broadcast date	Episode title	Nielsen Korea		TNmS	
Ep.	Broadcast date	Episode title	Nationwide	Seoul	Nationwide	Seoul
1	12 November 2014	"Pinocchio" (Note: The Adventures of Pinocchio)	7.8% (19th)	8.4% (17th)	7.8% (19th)	9.9% (14th)
2	13 November 2014	"The Ugly Duckling" (Note: The Ugly Duckling)	9.8% (15th)	10.8% (11th)	10.6% (14th)	12.8% (6th)
3	19 November 2014	"The Snow Queen" (Note: The Snow Queen)	9.4% (15th)	10.9% (11th)	9.4% (18th)	10.9% (14th)
4	20 November 2014	"Romeo and Juliet" (Note: Romeo and Juliet)	10.4% (16th)	11.8% (10th)	10.6% (14th)	12.8% (6th)
5	26 November 2014	"The King Has Donkey Ears" (Note: Midas)	10.2% (13th)	12.2% (8th)	9.2% (16th)	11.6% (9th)
6	27 November 2014	"Two Years' Vacation" (Note: Two Years' Vacation)	10.4% (14th)	12.1% (7th)	11.0% (11th)	14.1% (5th)
7	3 December 2014	"The Frog in the Well" (Note: Chinese fable 井底之蛙 ("a frog in a well"))	8.7% (16th)	9.6% (16th)	8.9% (18th)	11.3% (15th)
8	4 December 2014	"A Lucky Day" (Note: Korean short story A Lucky Day written by Hyun Jin-geon, published in 1924.)	10.2% (16th)	11.4% (11th)	10.8% (16th)	12.7% (10th)
9	10 December 2014	"The Pied Piper of Hamelin" (Note: Pied Piper of Hamelin)	10.1% (12th)	11.9% (8th)	9.2% (16th)	11.1% (11th)
10	11 December 2014	"The Boy Who Cried Wolf" (Note: The Boy Who Cried Wolf)	10.7% (14th)	12.3% (8th)	10.8% (14th)	13.2% (6th)
11	17 December 2014	"A Midsummer Night's Dream" (Note: A Midsummer Night's Dream)	10.4% (15th)	11.6% (10th)	11.1% (14th)	13.3% (7th)
12	18 December 2014	"The Magic Flute" (Note: The Magic Flute)	9.7% (18th)	10.9% (15th)	11.3% (14th)	13.5% (6th)
13	24 December 2014	"The Gift of the Magi" (Note: The Gift of the Magi)	9.8% (14th)	11.1% (8th)	10.4% (14th)	12.2% (9th)
14	25 December 2014	"Hansel and Gretel" (Note: Hansel and Gretel)	10.8% (14th)	11.7% (12th)	11.6% (11th)	13.3% (9th)
15	1 January 2015	"Don Quixote" (Note: Don Quixote)	12.9% (9th)	14.6% (5th)	13.3% (9th)	15.6% (7th)
16	7 January 2015	"The Emperor's New Clothes" (Note: The Emperor's New Clothes)	11.8% (9th)	14.0% (5th)	12.9% (9th)	15.7% (5th)
17	8 January 2015	The Scarlet Letter (Note: The Scarlet Letter)	12.9% (5th)	15.2% (4th)	12.7% (8th)	15.1% (5th)
18	14 January 2015	"The Red Shoes" (Note: The Red Shoes)	11.9% (8th)	13.3% (5th)	12.6% (8th)	16.0% (5th)
19	14 January 2015	"The North Wind and the Sun" (Note: The North Wind and the Sun)	11.3% (10th)	12.1% (7th)	12.1% (11th)	15.5% (6th)
20	15 January 2015	"Peter Pan" (Note: Peter Pan; or, the Boy Who Wouldn't Grow Up)	13.3% (5th)	15.1% (5th)	13.6% (6th)	16.7% (5th)
Average			10.6%	12.1%	11.0%	13.4%
In the table above, the blue numbers represent the lowest ratings and the red numbers represent the highest ratings.

== Awards and nominations ==
Year	Award	Category	Recipient	Result
2014	27th Grimae Awards	Best Actor	Lee Jong-suk	Won
2014	SBS Drama Awards	Top Excellence Award, Actor in a Drama Special	Lee Jong-suk	Nominated
2014	SBS Drama Awards	Top Excellence Award, Actress in a Drama Special	Park Shin-hye	Won
2014	SBS Drama Awards	Top 10 Stars	Lee Jong-suk	Won
2014	SBS Drama Awards	Top 10 Stars	Park Shin-hye	Won
2014	SBS Drama Awards	SBS Special Award	Lee Jong-suk	Won
2014	SBS Drama Awards	Netizen Popularity Award	Lee Jong-suk	Nominated
2014	SBS Drama Awards	Netizen Popularity Award	Park Shin-hye	Nominated
2014	SBS Drama Awards	Best Couple Award	Lee Jong-suk and Park Shin-hye	Won
2014	SBS Drama Awards	New Star Award	Kim Young-kwang	Won
2014	SBS Drama Awards	New Star Award	Lee Yu-bi	Won
2015	51st Baeksang Arts Awards	Best Actress (TV)	Park Shin-hye	Nominated
2015	51st Baeksang Arts Awards	Most Popular Actor (TV)	Lee Jong-suk	Won
2015	10th Seoul International Drama Awards	Outstanding Korean Drama	Pinocchio	Won
2015	8th Korea Drama Awards	Top Excellence Award, Actor	Lee Jong-suk	Won
2015	8th Korea Drama Awards	Top Excellence Award, Actress	Park Shin-hye	Nominated
2015	4th APAN Star Awards	Top Excellence Award, Actress in a Miniseries	Park Shin-hye	Nominated
2015	4th APAN Star Awards	Best Young Actor	Nam Da-reum	Won
2015	4th APAN Star Awards	Best Production Director	Jo Soo-won	Won
2015	4th APAN Star Awards	Best Original Soundtrack	"Pinocchio" by Roy Kim	Won
