= Golden Pouch =

2016 South Korean television series

- Promotional poster
- Hangul: 황금주머니
- RR: Hwanggeum jumeoni
- MR: Hwanggŭm chumŏni
- Genre: Family; Romantic drama
- Created by: Kim Seung-mo
- Written by: Lee Hye-sun
- Directed by: Kim Dae-jin
- Starring: Jin Yi-han; Ryu Hyo-young
- Country of origin: South Korea
- Original language: Korean
- No. of episodes: 122

Production
- Executive producers: Choi Jin-ho; Song Mi-heon
- Running time: 30 min
- Production companies: AYIN Holdings; SH Entertainment Group

Original release
- Network: MBC TV
- Release: November 14, 2016 – June 1, 2017

Golden Pouch (Korean: 황금주머니) is a 2016 South Korean television series starring Jin Yi-han and Ryu Hyo-young. The series aired daily on MBC from 20:55 to 21:30 (KST).

== Plot ==
Han Seok-hoon (Kim Ji-han), who was given up for adoption at six, tries to find his birth parents in South Korea. An accident on his wedding day leaves him with amnesia, and he mistakenly believes that the parents of Geum Seol-hwa (Ryu Hyo-young), a young TV producer, are his real parents. He stays with the family while recovering and experiences a feeling of family for the first time.

== Cast ==
=== Main ===
- Jin Yi-han (Note: Credited as Kim Ji-han) as Han Seok-hoon
  - Choi Seung-hoon as young Han Seok-hoon
- Ryu Hyo-young as Geum Seol-hwa

=== Yoon Joon-sang's family ===
- Lee Seon-ho as Yoon Joon-sang
  - Song Joon-hee as young Yoon Joon-sang
- Seo Woo-rim as Eun Kap-ja
- Ji Soo-won as Mo Nan-seol
- Cha Kwang-soo as Yoon Jae-rim
- Na In-woo as Yoon Ji-sang
- Seo Hye-jin as Song Jin-joo

=== Geum Seol-hwa's family ===
- Ahn Nae-sang as Geum Jung-do
- Oh Young-sil as Kim Choo-ja
- Dana as Geum Doo-na
- Baek Seo-yi as Geum Se-na
- – as Hwan Dol-yi

=== Bae Min-hee's family ===
- Yoo Hye-ri as Sa Gwi-jung
- Son Seung-woo as Bae Min-hee
- Lee Yong-joo as Bae Min-kyu

=== Others ===
- Kim Ji-eun as Han Sook-hoon's secretary

== Reception ==
During the Golden Pouch break, from February 6 to 15 due to MBC's "Special Program: Vetting the Presidential Nominees", Ryu Hyo-young scandal broke out, which lead to viewers demanding Ryu to step down from the series. However, MBC stated that there have been no talks about Ryu stepping down from her role in the series.

== Ratings ==
- In this table, The blue numbers represent the lowest ratings and the red numbers represent the highest ratings.
- NR denotes that the drama did not rank in the top 20 daily programs on that date.

Episode #	Original broadcast date	Average audience share			
Episode #	Original broadcast date	TNmS Ratings		AGB Nielsen	
Episode #	Original broadcast date	Nationwide	Seoul National Capital Area	Nationwide	Seoul National Capital Area
1	November 14, 2016	7.9% (17th)	8.6% (11th)	7.2% (NR)	8.2% (15th)
2	November 15, 2016	7.6% (16th)	7.3% (18th)	7.8% (16th)	8.3% (11th)
3	November 16, 2016	7.9% (15th)	7.1% (17th)	7.0% (17th)	6.7% (20th)
4	November 17, 2016	7.1% (20th)	6.9% (17th)	6.1% (NR)	(NR)
5	November 18, 2016	8.1% (16th)	7.4% (18th)	6.2% (NR)	(NR)
6	November 21, 2016	7.5% (19th)	6.7% (19th)	6.4% (NR)	(NR)
7	November 22, 2016	7.5% (15th)	6.9% (20th)	7.8% (15th)	7.5% (15th)
8	November 23, 2016	8.2% (15th)	8.0% (15th)	8.0% (15th)	7.9% (15th)
9	November 24, 2016	8.5% (15th)	7.9% (16th)	6.6% (NR)	7.0% (20th)
10	November 25, 2016	7.3% (16th)	6.7% (18th)	6.6% (18th)	(NR)
11	November 28, 2016	7.6% (19th)	(NR)	6.8%	7.2% (18th)
12	November 29, 2016	6.5% (NR)	(NR)	5.9% (NR)	(NR)
13	November 30, 2016	7.5% (18th)	6.8% (18th)	6.7%	6.7% (18th)
14	December 1, 2016	7.1% (19th)	(NR)	6.5% (19th)	6.5% (20th)
15	December 2, 2016	7.2% (17th)	(NR)	5.5% (NR)	(NR)
16	December 5, 2016	7.5% (16th)	6.9% (17th)	7.2% (17th)	8.1% (14th)
17	December 6, 2016	9.8% (10th)	9.0% (9th)	7.5% (16th)	7.9% (14th)
18	December 7, 2016	9.2% (12th)	8.5% (11th)	7.8% (12th)	8.1% (11th)
19	December 8, 2016	8.3% (NR)	(NR)	7.4% (16th)	7.7% (16th)
20	December 12, 2016	8.6% (16th)	7.7% (14th)	8.2% (15th)	8.8% (11th)
21	December 13, 2016	8.7% (13th)	8.2% (12th)	8.1% (12th)	8.4% (11th)
22	December 14, 2016	7.8% (17th)	7.1% (20th)	7.0% (18th)	7.1% (19th)
23	December 15, 2016	7.7% (17th)	6.6% (19th)	7.7% (17th)	7.8% (15th)
24	December 16, 2016	7.7% (17th)	6.7% (20th)	6.0% (NR)	(NR)
25	December 19, 2016	6.9% (NR)	(NR)	7.5% (18th)	7.9% (16th)
26	December 20, 2016	7.9% (16th)	7.1% (15th)	7.9% (11th)	8.2% (10th)
27	December 21, 2016	8.7% (14th)	8.3% (15th)	7.8% (13th)	7.8% (13th)
28	December 22, 2016	7.7% (16th)	7.4% (17th)	7.0% (18th)	7.0% (17th)
29	December 23, 2016	7.2% (19th)	(NR)	6.4% (NR)	(NR)
30	December 26, 2016	7.3% (19th)	6.9% (19th)	7.9% (15th)	8.1% (13th)
31	December 27, 2016	8.2% (15th)	7.2% (16th)	8.0% (12th)	8.2% (10th)
32	December 28, 2016	7.8% (15th)	7.0% (19th)	7.9% (15th)	8.0% (16th)
33	December 29, 2016	7.6% (18th)	(NR)	8.2% (14th)	8.8% (11th)
34	December 30, 2016	8.1% (18th)	7.8% (17th)	6.2% (NR)	(NR)
35	January 2, 2017	7.9% (15th)	7.6% (16th)	8.3% (15th)	8.8% (12th)
36	January 3, 2017	9.2% (13th)	8.1% (15th)	8.6% (12th)	9.2% (7th)
37	January 4, 2017	10.0% (9th)	9.3% (10th)	9.4% (10th)	9.3% (7th)
38	January 5, 2017	9.1% (13th)	8.1% (14th)	8.8% (12th)	9.1% (9th)
39	January 6, 2017	8.1% (16th)	7.3% (15th)	7.5% (15th)	7.7% (14th)
40	January 9, 2017	9.6% (12th)	9.1% (11th)	8.4% (13th)	8.8% (9th)
41	January 10, 2017	9.7% (10th)	9.0% (10th)	9.1% (9th)	9.6% (5th)
42	January 11, 2017	9.5% (12th)	8.7% (11th)	8.8% (11th)	9.1% (6th)
43	January 12, 2017	8.7% (14th)	8.3% (14th)	8.4% (11th)	8.8% (9th)
44	January 13, 2017	8.5% (17th)	7.7% (17th)	6.1% (19th)	(NR)
45	January 16, 2017	9.8% (13th)	9.8% (9th)	8.1% (14th)	8.1% (13th)
46	January 17, 2017	10.2% (10th)	9.3% (9th)	7.8% (17th)	8.1% (14th)
47	January 18, 2017	10.1% (9th)	8.5% (9th)	7.9% (15th)	8.3% (12th)
48	January 19, 2017	8.7% (16th)	7.5% (16th)	7.8% (16th)	8.0% (15th)
49	January 20, 2017	8.4% (17th)	7.4% (19th)	6.1% (NR)	(NR)
50	January 23, 2017	9.3% (13th)	8.8% (12th)	8.3% (17th)	8.1% (12th)
51	January 24, 2017	9.0% (12th)	8.5% (13th)	8.5% (14th)	8.4% (13th)
52	January 25, 2017	9.2% (12th)	7.6% (13th)	8.2% (10th)	8.1% (10th)
53	January 31, 2017	9.1% (14th)	9.2% (9th)	9.0% (13th)	9.2% (10th)
54	February 1, 2017	8.9% (15th)	8.1% (17th)	8.0% (18th)	7.9% (17th)
55	February 2, 2017	9.3% (15th)	8.6% (15th)	8.8% (15th)	9.1% (12th)
56	February 3, 2017	7.6% (17th)	6.9% (17th)	7.6% (16th)	7.5% (16th)
57	February 16, 2017	5.8% (NR)	(NR)	6.7% (20th)	(NR)
58	February 17, 2017	7.0% (17th)	6.4% (19th)	6.9% (18th)	6.8% (18th)
59	February 20, 2017	7.4% (17th)	(NR)	7.3% (NR)	7.4% (17th)
60	February 21, 2017	7.0% (16th)	6.2% (18th)	7.9% (16th)	8.2% (14th)
61	February 22, 2017	7.4% (18th)	(NR)	7.8% (16th)	7.8% (14th)
62	February 23, 2017	7.8% (17th)	(NR)	7.9% (17th)	8.4% (13th)
63	February 24, 2017	8.0% (16th)	6.2% (18th)	7.5% (17th)	7.4% (15th)
64	February 27, 2017	7.8% (16th)	6.5% (19th)	7.7% (19th)	7.8% (14th)
65	February 28, 2017	7.7% (17th)	6.3% (20th)	8.4% (14th)	8.9% (11th)
66	March 1, 2017	7.6% (17th)	(NR)	8.5% (12th)	9.0% (10th)
67	March 2, 2017	8.2% (18th)	7.2% (16th)	8.2% (15th)	8.6% (12th)
68	March 3, 2017	7.4% (17th)	6.3% (18th)	8.0% (17th)	8.1% (14th)
69	March 6, 2017	8.1% (16th)	6.5% (18th)	8.3% (16th)	8.5% (12th)
70	March 7, 2017	9.5% (10th)	8.3% (10th)	7.9% (14th)	7.4% (12th)
71	March 8, 2017	9.6% (NR)	(NR)	8.6% (13th)	8.5% (10th)
72	March 9, 2017	7.7% (15th)	6.3% (16th)	8.4% (12th)	8.6% (11th)
73	March 13, 2017	8.8% (16th)	7.2% (17th)	8.3% (14th)	8.0% (13th)
74	March 14, 2017	8.9% (11th)	7.2% (11th)	8.4% (11th)	8.2% (13th)
75	March 15, 2017	8.5% (12th)	7.9% (12th)	8.4% (11th)	8.6% (10th)
76	March 16, 2017	9.7% (9th)	8.1% (11th)	8.2% (12th)	8.3% (12th)
77	March 17, 2017	9.8% (10th)	9.1% (11th)	8.4% (13th)	8.6% (11th)
78	March 20, 2017	9.6% (11th)	9.1% (10th)	8.7% (14th)	8.8% (11th)
79	March 21, 2017	9.0% (9th)	8.3% (8th)	8.7% (8th)	8.8% (7th)
80	March 22, 2017	9.6% (11th)	8.8% (11th)	8.8% (10th)	8.7% (9th)
81	March 23, 2017	10.5% (7th)	9.1% (10th)	8.7% (9th)	8.5% (8th)
82	March 24, 2017	8.6% (13th)	7.9% (15th)	8.2% (12th)	8.7% (9th)
83	March 28, 2017	10.0% (10th)	8.3% (13th)	8.6% (11th)	8.1% (11th)
84	March 29, 2017	9.0% (14th)	7.9% (15th)	8.4% (11th)	8.1% (12th)
85	March 30, 2017	8.7% (12th)	7.9% (14th)	8.1% (12th)	8.4% (10th)
86	March 31, 2017	9.4% (12th)	7.9% (14th)	7.8% (14th)	8.1% (11th)
87	April 3, 2017	10.7% (10th)	9.4% (8th)	9.0% (11th)	9.5% (10th)
88	April 4, 2017	10.3% (9th)	8.9% (10th)	8.7% (11th)	9.0% (8th)
89	April 5, 2017	9.7% (13th)	8.9% (13th)	8.7% (13th)	8.6% (11th)
90	April 6, 2017	9.0% (13th)	7.6% (18th)	8.0% (16th)	8.1% (13th)
91	April 7, 2017	8.7% (13th)	7.3% (15th)	8.0% (10th)	7.8% (10th)
92	April 10, 2017	9.8% (12th)	8.6% (11th)	8.3% (14th)	8.6% (11th)
93	April 11, 2017	10.1% (11th)	9.0% (10th)	8.6% (10th)	8.5% (9th)
94	April 12, 2017	10.6% (7th)	8.8% (10th)	7.9% (13th)	7.9% (12th)
95	April 13, 2017	9.6% (12th)	8.3% (16th)	8.0% (13th)	7.8% (14th)
96	April 14, 2017	9.1% (11th)	7.7% (16th)	7.5% (12th)	7.7% (13th)
97	April 17, 2017	10.2% (12th)	9.0% (10th)	8.4% (15th)	8.4% (12th)
98	April 18, 2017	11.0% (8th)	9.3% (9th)	9.4% (9th)	9.5% (9th)
99	April 19, 2017	9.2% (13th)	8.0% (14th)	7.3% (13th)	6.6% (15th)
100	April 20, 2017	11.4% (7th)	10.9% (7th)	8.9% (11th)	9.0% (8th)
101	April 21, 2017	10.9% (7th)	9.5% (7th)	8.8% (9th)	8.5% (8th)
102	April 24, 2017	8.7% (16th)	8.5% (11th)	7.4% (14th)	7.5% (16th)
103	April 25, 2017	10.7% (8th)	10.3% (7th)	8.7% (10th)	8.4% (9th)
104	April 26, 2017	10.5% (6th)	9.5% (6th)	9.6% (7th)	9.3% (7th)
105	April 27, 2017	6.1% (NR)	(NR)	5.3% (NR)	(NR)
106	May 1, 2017	10.9% (9th)	9.2% (8th)	8.7% (10th)	8.6% (8th)
107	May 4, 2017	8.6% (11th)	8.2% (10th)	7.4% (10th)	7.7% (10th)
108	May 5, 2017	9.3% (9th)	8.5% (11th)	7.9% (9th)	8.0% (9th)
109	May 11, 2017	9.7% (11th)	9.0% (11th)	8.2% (12th)	7.9% (13th)
110	May 12, 2017	9.4% (10th)	7.4% (17th)	7.5% (16th)	7.2% (15th)
111	May 15, 2017	9.8% (10th)	9.6% (10th)	8.2% (11th)	8.4% (11th)
112	May 16, 2017	9.9% (9th)	8.3% (12th)	8.7% (8th)	8.3% (10th)
113	May 17, 2017	7.8% (16th)	6.8% (20th)	8.1% (12th)	7.3% (17th)
114	May 18, 2017	9.9% (8th)	8.4% (11th)	9.0% (11th)	8.9% (9th)
115	May 19, 2017	9.9% (10th)	8.4% (13th)	7.7% (13th)	7.0% (14th)
116	May 22, 2017	11.3% (6th)	10.3% (6th)	9.5% (8th)	8.2% (8th)
117	May 23, 2017	10.3% (8th)	9.1% (10th)	9.2% (8th)	9.0% (7th)
118	May 24, 2017	10.7% (7th)	9.1% (8th)	9.8% (8th)	10.0% (7th)
119	May 25, 2017	10.2% (10th)	8.6% (11th)	9.1% (9th)	9.1% (9th)
120	May 29, 2017	9.7% (9th)	8.2% (11th)	8.5% (12th)	8.2% (12th)
121	May 31, 2017	10.1% (9th)	8.7% (12th)	8.7% (11th)	9.0% (11th)
122	June 1, 2017	10.0% (11th)	9.7% (10th)	9.4% (10th)	9.3% (9th)
Average		8.8%	%	7.9%	%

- Episode 20 did not air on December 9 due to a special news broadcast.
- Episodes did not air on January 26, 27, and 30 due to various other special programming.
- Episodes did not air on February 6 – February 15, due to coverage of presidential candidates.
- Episode 73 did not air on March 10 due to special news coverage of the impeachment trial of President Park Geun Hye.
- Episode 83 did not air on March 27.
- Episode 105 did not air on April 28 due to a presidential debate.
- Episode 106 did not air on May 2 due to the broadcast of a presidential debate.
- Episode 106 did not air on May 3 due to the broadcast of 'Mystery Rank Show 123'.
- Episode 108 did not air on May 9 due to news coverage of the presidential election.
- Episode 108 did not air on May 10 due to a special news program.
- Episode 120 did not air on May 26 due to the broadcast of the 2017 FIFA U-20 World Cup match between South Korea and England.
- Episode 121 did not air on May 30 due to the broadcast of the 2017 FIFA U-20 World Cup Round of 16 match between South Korea and Portugal.
