= Han Da-min =

South Korean actress (born 1983)

- Born: Ham Mi-na; November 1, 1983 (age 42); South Korea
- Education: Kyung Hee University - Sociology
- Occupation: Actress
- Years active: 2006–present
- Agent: Art Arch Entertainment

Korean name
- Hangul: 함미나
- RR: Ham Mina
- MR: Ham Mina

Stage name
- Hangul: 한다민
- RR: Han Damin
- MR: Han Tamin

Han Da-min (Korean: 한다민; born November 1, 1983), birth name Ham Mi-na, is a South Korean actress. She starred in the television drama You're Only Mine (2014).

== Filmography ==
=== Television series ===
Year	Title	Role	Network
2006	Seoul 1945	Nurse Yang	KBS1
2006	The Invisible Man, Choi Jang-soo	Jung Soon-kyung	KBS2
2006	Love Me When You Can	Lee Ji-hye	MBC
2006	Drama City: "For Ten Minutes, Your Trivial"	Teacher of young Lee Hwa-in	KBS2
2007	Surgeon Bong Dal-hee	Min-ji's mother	SBS
2007	Merry Mary	The Clever One	MBC
2007	Coffee Prince	Han Byul	MBC
2007	Drama City: "For the New School"	Lee Jung-ah	KBS2
2007	The King and I	Queen Gonghye	SBS
2008	Wanted: Son-in-law	Han Eun-soo	SBS
2008	Chunja's Special Day	Park Jung-yeon	MBC
2009	Cain and Abel	Lee Jung-min	SBS
2010	Dong Yi	Eun-geum	MBC
2010	Giant	Cheon Soo-yeon	SBS
2014	You're Only Mine	Lee Yoo-ra	SBS

=== Film ===
Year	Title	Role
2006	The Legend of Seven Cutter	Lee Yoon-ah
