= You're Only Mine =

- Promotional poster
- Also known as: Only My Love; My Only Dear
- Genre: Romance; Melodrama; Revenge
- Written by: Ma Joo-hee
- Directed by: Kim Jung-min
- Starring: Lee Min-young; Jung Sung-hwan; Song Jae-hee; Han Da-min
- Country of origin: South Korea
- Original language: Korean
- No. of episodes: 121

Production
- Executive producers: Han Jung-hwan; Kim Yong-jin
- Producers: Park Kyung-ryul; Song Min-sook
- Production location: Korea
- Running time: Mondays to Fridays at 08:30 (KST)
- Production company: SBS Plus

Original release
- Network: Seoul Broadcasting System
- Release: January 20 – July 18, 2014

You're Only Mine (Korean: 나만의 당신; RR: Namanui dangsin) is a 2014 South Korean morning soap opera broadcast by SBS starring Lee Min-young, Jung Sung-hwan, Song Jae-hee and Han Da-min. It aired from January 20 to July 18, 2014 on Mondays to Fridays at 8:30 a.m. for 121 episodes.

== Plot ==
Eun-jung is the daughter of a widow who once shined shoes for a living. When she becomes involved in a terrible crime committed by her husband Sung-jae and his mother, she loses everything. Against all odds, Eun-jung climbs up the corporate ladder to become a successful shoe designer of a prestigious brand.

== Cast ==
=== Main characters ===
- Lee Min-young as Go Eun-jung
- Jung Sung-hwan as Lee Joon-ha
- Song Jae-hee as Kang Sung-jae
- Han Da-min as Lee Yoo-ra, Joon-ha's younger sister

=== Supporting characters ===
- Sunwoo Eun-sook as Na Soon-shim, Eun-jung's mother
- Lee Yeon-soo as Na Han-shim, Eun-jung's aunt
- Oh Cho-hee as Go Eun-byul, Eun-jung's younger sister and Young-sook's biological daughter
- Lee Myung-hoon as Go Eun-shan, Eun-jung's younger brother
- Lee Hwi-hyang as Jang Young-sook, Yoo-ra's mother
- Lee Dong-joon as Lee Byung-joon, Joon-ha's father
- Park Hyung-jun as Lee Joon-hyuk, Joon-ha's older brother, the son of Byung-joon's legal wife
- Jung Shi-yeon as Joo Hee-jin, Joon-hyuk's wife
- Yoo Hye-ri as Oh Kwang-ja, Sung-jae's mother
- Moon Cheon-shik as Oh Kwang-dal, Kwang-ja's younger brother
- Yoo So-young as Kang Sung-ah, Sung-jae's younger sister
