= Choi Su-rin =

South Korean actress and model (born 1974)

- Born: Choi Jung-il; 25 December 1974 (age 51); Pyeongtaek, South Korea
- Other name: Choi Soo-rin
- Education: Seoul Institute of the Arts
- Occupations: Actress; model
- Years active: 2000–present
- Known for: Hi! School: Love On; Dangerous Love; My Bloody Lover
- Children: Son Seung Hoon-Lee
- Family: Yoo Hye-ri (older sister)

Choi Jung-il (Korean: 최정일; born 25 December 1974), better known by the stage name Choi Su-rin (최수린), is a South Korean actress and model. She is known for her roles in dramas such as Hi! School: Love On, Who Are You: School 2015, Bad Thief, Good Thief and Enemies from the Past. She also had lead roles in Dangerous Love and My Bloody Lover.

== Filmography ==
=== Television ===
Year	Title	Role	Ref.
2000	Three Friends	Jung	
2002	Mom's Song	Kim Yoon-sook	
2005	Dangerous Love	Hong Se-jin	
2006	Dream of Salmon	Lee So-yeon	
2006	A Baby Singing Lullabies	Jin	
2007	Hello! Miss	Hwang Yoo-il	
2007	Catch a Kang Nam Mother	Choi Il-young	
2008	You Stole My Heart	Hyun Mi-kyung	
2008	My Bloody Lover	Yu-seon	
2008	My Precious You	Seo Young-joo	
2009	Kyung-sook's Father	Yoon-sup's Mother	
2009	Give Me Food	Cha Hwa-jin	
2009	Partner	Yoo Mi-yun	
2009	Hometown Legends – "Myo-jeong's Pearl"	The Queen	
2009	Hero	Madam P	
2010	Jejungwon	Mak-saeng	
2010	Golden Fish	Park Ji-hye	
2010	Kim Su-ro, The Iron King	Jo-bang's wife	
2010	Byul Soon-geom 3	Shin Jung-hoo's wife	
2010	Home Sweet Home	Jo Soo-min	
2011	Twinkle Twinkle	Seo-woo's mother	
2011	I Believed in Men	Karen	
2011	Living in Style	Nam Eun-jung	
2012	12 Signs of Love	Michelle Jang	
2012	The King's Doctor	Joo In-ok	
2013	The Secret of Birth	Jung Joo-kyeom	
2013	A Tale of Two Sisters	Sarah Kim	
2013	Love in Her Bag	Eun Hye-jeong	
2013	A Little Love Never Hurts	Sin Soo-jeong	
2014	Hi! School: Love On	Ahn Ji-hye	
2014	KBS TV Novel – "Single-minded Dandelion"	Madam Jang	
2014	Apgujeong Midnight Sun	Mo Narija	
2015	Heart to Heart	Doctor Uhm's friend	
2015	Who Are You: School 2015	Tae-gwang's mother	
2015	A Bird That Doesn't Sing	Min Ha-gyeong	
2015	Mom	Shim Cho-hee	
2015	Sweet Home, Sweet Honey	Kim Eul-nyun	
2016	Always Springtime	Park Jong-shim	
2017	Bad Thief, Good Thief	Hong Shin-ae	
2017	Man in the Kitchen	Susanna / Lee Kyeong-hwa	
2017	Enemies from the Past	Oh Na-ra	
2018	Gangnam Scandal	Baek Choon-mi	
2019	Everybody Say Kungdari	Jo Bok-ja	
2019	The Great Show	Dae-han's stepmother	
2020	Hospital Playlist	Oh Yu-min	
2020	Love Revolution	Kyung-woo's mother	
2021	Be A Meal	Min-kyeong	
2022	It's Beautiful Now	Jin-ju	
2022	Vengeance of the Bride	Nam In-soon	
2022	Behind Every Star	Joo Ha-min's mother	
2023	Unpredictable Family	Shim Jeong-ae	
2024	My Merry Marriage	Audrey	
2024	The Brave Yong Su-jeong	Lee Jae-in	
2026	Family Register	Kim Sun-Kyeong	
2026	Sword & Silence	Queen Seondeok	

=== Film ===
Year	Title	Role	Language	Ref.
2009	Marine Boy	Jazz bar owner	Korean	
2014	Our Older Sister	Noblewomen	Korean	

== Awards and nominations ==
- 2015 Nominated for Best Supporting Actress
