= When Adam Opens His Eyes =

Book by Jang Jung-il

- Author: Jang Jung-il
- Original title: 아담이 눈뜰 때
- Language: Korean
- Publication date: 1990

When Adam Opens His Eyes (Korean: 아담이 눈뜰 때) is a Korean novel written by Jang Jung-il. It is a coming-of-age story of a 19-year-old boy who has taken a gap year to retake the yearly College Scholastic Ability Test, and also an artist novel that seeks a possibility of life through writing. The novel is considered to have led the beginning of the Korean literature of the 1990s.

== Plot ==
=== Title ===
"Adam" is the nickname of the novel's narrator and protagonist, the 19-year-old boy. It signifies his ignorant and immature state, like Adam of the Bible when he is thrown out of the Garden of Eden. The phrase "open his eyes" means the process of the boy entering into and learning about the world, becoming an adult. The title When Adam Opens His Eyes implies both his incorporation into the established system and securing of his own distinguishable territory.

=== Summary ===
"When I was 19 years old, all I wanted was to have a typewriter, a book of Munch's paintings, and a turntable which I can connect to a cassette player and listen to music. Those items were the only things I wished to get from the world as a 19-year-old.(p.9)" When Adam Opens His Eyes describes how the main character pays the price for the three things he wants to have, the typewriter, the book of Munch's paintings, and the turntable, and becomes an adult. He poses as a nude model in front of a middle-aged woman painter and acquires the book of paintings; gets anally raped by a gay man who owns a record store and gains the turntable. In this process of replacing and exchanging desires, his friend Hyeon-jae kills himself. In shock, the narrator realizes that he has to get away from 'the worship of objects in the modern world' and the desires of 'the false paradise.' He gives up college, buys the typewriter with his tuition fee, and starts to write sentences about 'the real paradise.'

=== False paradise ===
The protagonist commercializes his body to get what he wants. The woman painter claims that, in this world where love is impossible, sex is "the only alternative." The owner of the record store attempts to dominate him with money and violence. All the characters of this novel, including the protagonist, live in 'the false paradise' where the capitalist logic of exchange rules.

=== Coming-of-age story ===
At the end of the novel, the main character gives up college. Coming-of-age stories mostly end with their protagonists adapting to the world after wandering away from their life. On the contrary, in this novel, he puts off the task of adapting to the world, refuses to grow up, and decides to remain as a boy for eternity. In this light, this novel can be regarded as an 'anti-coming-of-age story.'

=== Artist novel ===
The narrator considers himself "Adam who opened his eyes in the false paradise," refuses to grow up, and instead, immerses himself in art. At the end, he chooses writing, as a way of standing against this corrupt world. The typewriter, unlike the book of Munch's paintings and turntable, is something he buys without bargaining his body and soul. He aims to find the 'real' paradise, through the painful job that is writing with the typewriter. When Adam Opens His Eyes is an artist novel, in that it pursues the 'real' values by means of art and writing.

=== The beginning of the 1990s novel ===
The novel is viewed as the work that led the beginning of the Korean literature of the 1990s. It is set in 1988 when the Seoul Olympics were held, but it shows the general changes that occurred in the 1990s, which can be summed up as individualism, liberalism, and popular culture. The Korean literature of the 1990s started with the deconstruction of the established literary traditions and rules and the representation of the new generation's experiences and sentiments. And it was given the 'new' name, a postmodernism that has 'belatedly' arrived. When Adam Opens His Eyes stands at the head of 1990s literature, the literature of 'the new generation' and 'postmodernism.'

=== Critical reception ===
Right after its publication, a huge controversy was ignited due to the novel's sexual depictions. The author was attacked by the public who claimed that he was soiling the world with his pornographic novel. However, critics from abroad voiced different opinions. The Japanese literary journal Shincho published its translation of the novel, and subsequently the newspaper Yomiuri Shimbun published an editorial, highly acclaiming Jang Jung-il as "the author who distinctively embodies the human experience of the consumerist society and represents the postmodernist literature." Later, he once again stood in the middle of a great controversy as his novel Naege geojitmareul haebwa (내게 거짓말을 해봐, Lie to Me), similar to When Adam Opens His Eyes, was attacked and indicted for its excessive obscenities. On the other hand, some pointed out that the novel is male-centered in its sexual descriptions and neglects the reality that is unfavorable to women.

== Adaptations ==
The 1993 film When Adam Opens His Eyes, directed by Kim Ho-seon, is adapted from this novel. It was criticized for lacking in new interpretation of the original work, the unlikely development of Adam murdering the owner of the record store, and poor depictions of the sentiments of the new generation. In addition, some found fault with its marketing for focusing too much on the sexual debauchery of the innocent protagonist and with its immoderate portrayal of sex scenes, damaging the value of the original work.

== Bibliography ==
=== Edition ===
장정일, <<아담이 눈뜰 때>>, 미학사, 1990 / Jang Jung-il, When Adam Opens His Eyes, Mihaksa, 1990.

=== Works in translation ===
장정일, <<아담이 눈뜰 때>>, 미학사, 1990 / アダムが目覚めるとき, Shinchosha, 1992.

장정일, <<아담이 눈뜰 때>>, 미학사, 1990 / When Adam Opens His Eyes, Dalkey Archive Press, 2013.
