= Sweet Home, Sweet Honey =

2015–2016 South Korean television series

- Promotional poster
- Also known as: My Home's Honey Jar; The Honey Pot
- Genre: Family; Drama
- Written by: Kang Sung-jin; Kim Mi-hee
- Directed by: Kim Myung-wook
- Starring: Song Ji-eun; Lee Jae-joon; Seo Yi-an; Kim Min-soo
- Country of origin: South Korea
- Original language: Korean
- No. of episodes: 129

Production
- Running time: 35 minutes

Original release
- Network: KBS1
- Release: November 2, 2015 – April 29, 2016

Sweet Home, Sweet Honey (Korean: 우리집 꿀단지; lit. 'Our Home's Honey Pot') is a 2015 South Korean daily drama starring Song Ji-eun, Lee Jae-joon, Seo Yi-an and Kim Min-soo. It aired on KBS1 on Mondays to Fridays at 20:25 for 129 episodes from 2 November 2015 to 29 April 2016.

== Plot ==
The story about a group of youngsters being pushed into society and the people around them.

== Cast ==
=== Main characters ===
- Song Ji-eun as Oh Bom / Choi Pa-ran (Choi Bom)

A girl who was claimed to be an illegitimate child of her father. She suffered abuse from her stepmother since young due to her illegitimate child status. In fact, Bom was adopted since young and had lost her memories of her childhood before adoption. Choi Pa-ran was her real name.

- Lee Jae-joon as Kang Ma-roo

A man who fell in love with Bom.

- Seo Yi-an as Choi Ah-ran

Oh Bom's love rival and an ambitious woman who often mistreated Bom out of jealousy. Things became more complicated when Ah-ran was revealed to be Bom's long-lost biological sister.

- Kim Min-soo as Ahn Tae-ho
- Choi Myung-gil as Bae Gook-hee
- Lee Young-ha as Choi Jung-gi
- Kim Yu-seok as Ahn Gil-soo

=== Supporting characters ===
- Kim Yong-rim as Kim Eul-nyeon
- Choi Dae-chul as Lee Bae-dal
- Choi Su-rin as Kim Eul-nyun
- Yoo Hye-ri as Lee Mi-dal
- Joo Da-young as Choi Ji-ah
- Yoo Yeon-mi as Oh Ga-eul
- Choi Jae-sung as Kang Tae-joon
- Yeo Hoon-min as Ahn Soo-ho

== Awards and nominations ==
Year	Award	Category	Recipient	Result
2016	KBS Drama Awards	Excellence Award, Actor in a Daily Drama	Kim Yu-seok	Nominated
2016	KBS Drama Awards	Excellence Award, Actress in a Daily Drama	Song Ji-eun	Nominated
2016	KBS Drama Awards	Best Supporting Actor	Choi Dae-chul	Nominated
