= Park Shin-won =

South Korean musician

- Born: December 7, 1988 (age 36); Gwangju, South Korea
- Occupation(s): Guitarist, composer
- Years active: 2008–present
- Height: 187 cm (6 ft 1 1/2 in)
- Spouse: Unknown (m. 2022)
- Family: Park Shin-hye (sister)

Korean name
- Hangul: 박신원
- Hanja: 朴信元
- RR: Bak Sinwon
- MR: Pak Sinwŏn

Park Shin-won (born December 7, 1988) is a South Korean guitarist and composer.

== Early life ==
Park Shin-won was born in Gwangju, but raised in Songpa District, Seoul. He graduated from Seoul Institute of the Arts, in practical music.

== Career ==
Park has appeared in SBS Power FM MC Mong's Living Together in August 2008, and has worked as a member of the acoustic guitar folk group Tree Bicycle, composing the song "One More Time" for Boys Over Flowers soundtrack. He also collaborated as writer for the song "Oh My God" by boy band B1A4, included in their second album Who Am I. He is a member of Cho Hyung-woo's band.

Park had released a digital single in 2010 , later worked as a guitarist in concert singers such as IU.

On December 10, 2014, Park and his younger sister, actress Park Shin-hye, recorded the soundtrack for the TV series Pinocchio. Park Shin-hye provided vocals for the song "Love Like Snow", while Park Shin-won played the guitar.

Park collaborated with singer Yoo Sung-eun for television series The K2 soundtrack "Sometimes" as guitarist in 2016.

== Personal life ==
On June 2, 2022, Park announced that he is marrying his non-celebrity girlfriend.

== Show performance ==
- 2014 - Park Shin-hye World Tour: Story of Angel in Taipei, Taiwan (September 14, 2014)
- 2023 - Suga Agust D D-Day Tour

== Live show ==
Year	Title	Artist	Channel	Note
2014	MBC Show! Music Core	Cho Hyung-woo	MBC	18 October 2014
