= Jang Jeongil =

Korean poet and novelist (born 1962)

- Born: 1962 (age 63–64)
- Occupations: Poet, Novelist, Playwright
- Writing career
- Language: Korean

- Jang Jeongil
- Hangul: 장정일
- Hanja: 蔣正一
- RR: Jang Jeongil
- MR: Chang Chŏngil

Jang Jeongil (Korean: 장정일; born 1962) is a South Korean poet, playwright, and novelist.

== Life ==
Jang Jeongil was born in Dalseong County, Daegu, South Korea in 1962. He embarked on his literary career in 1984 when four of his poems including “Gangjeong ganda” were published in volume 3 of The World of Language.

== Work ==
Jang Jeongil kicked off his literary career in 1984 with the publication of four poems including Going to Gangjeong in The World of Language and was quickly labeled a "masochistic terrorist," and a poet who "exposes pretensions of wickedness in society with devilishly puritanical spirit".

In 1987, his play Interior Drama (Sillaegeuk) was chosen as the winner of the New Spring Literary Contest sponsored by Dong-a Ilbo and his poetry collection A Meditation on Hamburger (Haembeogeoae daehan meongsang) won the Kim Su-yeong Literature Prize. Despite the fact that his formal education ended after he graduated from Seongseo Middle School, Jang Jeong-il possesses encyclopedic knowledge of poetry, music, drama and culture, which heightened public fascination with the author. Jang’s When Adam Opens His Eyes (Adami nuneul tteulttae) contains stories of many different genres.

Much of Jang Jeongil's work has been adapted into movies or plays, including his A Journey with Oedipus. Jang’s work relies on the innovative technique of communicating through self-destruction. Exposing the destructive evil lying underneath the seemingly wholesome exterior of the society, the author purposely stimulates a feeling of discomfort in the readers while revealing himself fully and without shame. Jang was arrested when the court judged his novel, Try Lying to Me (Naegae geojinmareul haeboa, 1996) to be pornographic.

== Works in Translation ==
- The Shampoo Fairy (1987) - This work was later the inspiration for the 1990 song '샴푸의 요정(Fairy of Shampoo)' by the band Light & Salt, Jang Kee-Ho & Park Sung-Sik. Further eliciting a 2020 remake of the same name by Tomorrow X Together
- Voices in Diversity: Poets from Postwar Korea (전후시선 )
- When Adam's Eyes Opened (November, 2013)

== Works in Korean (Partial) ==
Poetry Collections

- A Meditation on Hamburger (Haembeogeo-e daehan myeongsang, 1987)
- Catching a Cab in the Road (Gil aneseo taeksi japgi) (1988)

Short-Story Collections

- I Send Myself To You (Neo-ege nareul bonaenda, 1992)
- Do You Believe in Jazz? (Neohiga jaejeureul minneunya?, 1994)
- Try Lying To Me (Naege geojinmareul haebwa, 1996)

Collection of Plays

- A Long Journey (Gin yeohaeng, 1995).

== Awards ==
- Kim Suyeong Literary Award (1987)
