= The Listen =

South Korean television program

- Promotional poster of S6
- Genre: Music; Travel; Reality
- Starring: See below
- Country of origin: South Korea
- Original language: Korean
- No. of seasons: 6
- No. of episodes: 25

Production
- Production location: South Korea
- Running time: 60 minutes

Original release
- Network: SBS
- Release: September 26, 2021 – November 4, 2026

The Listen (Korean: 더 리슨) is a South Korean music-travel television program series that airs on SBS. The show premiered on September 26, 2021, followed by new seasons in 2022, 2024 (Seasons 3 and 4), 2025, and 2026.

== Synopsis ==
The Listen is a music travel reality program that follows vocalists on a busking trip across various South Korean cities.

The initial season followed a five-member female group named "The Listen" during their travels through Mokpo, releasing both individual solo singles and a group collaboration track. Season 2 featured seven male vocalists busking in various locations from Sinchon to Gwangju, while Season 3 formed a six-member male group, "Voi6," collaborating with special guest artists across Seoul, Daejeon, and Buyeo. Season 4 introduced the show's first co-ed group (five males and four females), expanding to Gongju, Daegu, and Hongseong. In Season 5, the format shifted toward public-support busking, taking the cast into everyday urban locations such as university campuses, parks, and Seoul Plaza. Season 6 will feature a massive 14-member lineup, and follows a similar format of Season 5.

== Cast ==
=== Season 1 (Wind Blows) ===
- Solji (EXID)
- Kim Na-young
- Kassy
- Seunghee (Oh My Girl)
- Hynn

=== Season 2 (The Voices We Love) ===
- Huh Gak
- Shin Yong-jae (2F)
- Kim Won-joo (2F)
- Lim Han-byul
- Son Dong-woon (Highlight)
- Juho
- Kim Hee-jae

=== Season 3 (Every Moment with You) ===
- Huh Gak
- Lim Han-byul
- Kim Hee-jae
- Lee Jin-sung (Monday Kiz)
- Lee Mu-jin
- #Annyeong

=== Season 4 (We Sing Together Again) ===
- Kassy
- Hynn
- Lee Jin-sung (Monday Kiz)
- DK (December)
- Lee Ye-joon
- Woody
- Yoo Hwe-seung (N.Flying)
- Bang Ye-dam
- EB

=== Season 5 (Reaching You) ===
- Huh Gak
- #Annyeong
- Bang Ye-dam
- Ken (VIXX)
- Kwon Jin-ah
- Ash Island
- Big Naughty
- Jeon Sang-keun

=== Season 6 (The Season We Stayed) ===
- DK (December)
- Lee Ye-joon
- Kim Hee-jae
- Lee Young-hyun (Big Mama)
- Tei
- Lee Seung-gi
- Suho (Exo)
- Yuju
- Chuu
- Jongho (Ateez)
- Sin Ye-young
- Park Ji-hyeon
- Song Min-jun
- Lee Ye-ji

== Seasons ==
| Season | Title | Episodes | First aired | Last aired |
|---|---|---|---|---|
| 1 | Wind Blows (바람이 분다) | 4 | September 26, 2021 | October 17, 2021 |
| 2 | The Voices We Love (우리가 사랑한 목소리) | 4 | November 5, 2022 | November 27, 2022 |
| 3 | Every Moment with You (너와 함께한 시간) | 4 | June 21, 2024 | July 12, 2024 |
| 4 | We Sing Together Again (우리 함께 다시) | 4 | October 25, 2024 | November 15, 2024 |
| 5 | Reaching You (오늘, 너에게 닿다) | 4 | October 15, 2025 | November 5, 2025 |
| 6 | The Season We Stayed (우리가 머문 계절) | 5 | October 7, 2026 | November 4, 2026 |

== Discography (Season 1) ==
=== The Day I Loved You ===
Released on September 26, 2021
| No. | Title | Lyrics | Music | Artist | Length |
|---|---|---|---|---|---|
| 1. | "The Day I Loved You" (사랑했던 날) | Kim Se-jin; Kim Na-young | Kim Se-jin | Kim Na-young | 4:10 |
| 2. | "The Day I Loved You" (Inst.) | | Kim Se-jin | | 4:10 |

=== Letter ===
Released on October 2, 2021
| No. | Title | Lyrics | Music | Artist | Length |
|---|---|---|---|---|---|
| 1. | "Letter" (편지) | Shoulder Gangster | Shoulder Gangster; flyn | Seunghee (Oh My Girl) | 3:21 |
| 2. | "Letter" (Inst.) | | Shoulder Gangster; flyn | | 3:21 |

=== I Wish ===
Released on October 3, 2021
| No. | Title | Lyrics | Music | Artist | Length |
|---|---|---|---|---|---|
| 1. | "I Wish" (바래) | SOOP; Hynn | Han Kyung-soo (ARTMATIC); Lee Do-hyung (Lohi) | Hynn | 3:30 |
| 2. | "I Wish" (Inst.) | | Han Kyung-soo (ARTMATIC); Lee Do-hyung (Lohi) | | 3:30 |

=== Waste of Emotions ===
Released on October 9, 2021
| No. | Title | Lyrics | Music | Artist | Length |
|---|---|---|---|---|---|
| 1. | "Waste of Emotions" (감정 낭비) | Baek Ma-ri; Noheul | Noheul; Baek Ma-ri; KRAZY PARK | Solji (EXID) | 3:49 |
| 2. | "Waste of Emotions" (Inst.) | | Noheul; Baek Ma-ri; KRAZY PARK | | 3:49 |

=== You Are Falling All Night ===
Released on October 10, 2021
| No. | Title | Lyrics | Music | Artist | Length |
|---|---|---|---|---|---|
| 1. | "You Are Falling All Night" (밤새 니가 내려) | Kassy | Cho Young-soo; Lee Yoo-jin | Kassy | 3:14 |
| 2. | "You Are Falling All Night" (Inst.) | | Cho Young-soo; Lee Yoo-jin | | 3:14 |

=== Still Parting From Us ===
Released on October 18, 2021
| No. | Title | Lyrics | Music | Artist | Length |
|---|---|---|---|---|---|
| 1. | "Still Parting From Us" (느린 이별) | Han Kyung-soo (ARTMATIC); Yoonthoven | Han Kyung-soo (ARTMATIC); Lee Do-hyung (Lohi) | The Listen | 4:22 |
| 2. | "Still Parting From Us" (Inst.) | | Han Kyung-soo (ARTMATIC); Lee Do-hyung (Lohi) | | 4:22 |

=== The Listen ===
Released on October 24, 2021
| No. | Title | Lyrics | Music | Artist | Length |
|---|---|---|---|---|---|
| 1. | "The Day I Loved You" (사랑했던 날) | Kim Se-jin; Kim Na-young | Kim Se-jin | Kim Na-young | 4:10 |
| 2. | "Letter" (편지) | Shoulder Gangster | Shoulder Gangster; flyn | Seunghee (Oh My Girl) | 3:21 |
| 3. | "I Wish" (바래) | SOOP; Hynn | Han Kyung-soo (ARTMATIC); Lee Do-hyung (Lohi) | Hynn | 3:30 |
| 4. | "Waste of Emotions" (감정 낭비) | Baek Ma-ri; Noheul | Noheul; Baek Ma-ri; KRAZY PARK | Solji (EXID) | 3:49 |
| 5. | "You Are Falling All Night" (밤새 니가 내려) | Kassy | Cho Young-soo; Lee Yoo-jin | Kassy | 3:14 |
| 6. | "I Miss You" (그리워) | Glody; RAID; JANE | Glody; Hwang Deuk-kyung | Juho | 3:39 |
| 7. | "Still Parting From Us" (느린 이별) | Han Kyung-soo (ARTMATIC); Yoonthoven | Han Kyung-soo (ARTMATIC); Lee Do-hyung (Lohi) | The Listen | 4:22 |

=== Chart rankings ===
| Title | Peak chart positions |
| Title | KOR |
|---|---|
| "The Day I Loved You" (사랑했던 날) | 106 |
| "Letter" (편지) | — (Note: "Letter" did not enter the Gaon Digital Chart, but peaked at position 58 on the component Download chart.) |
| "I Wish" (바래) | 71 |
| "Waste of Emotions" (감정 낭비) | — (Note: "Waste of Emotions" did not enter the Gaon Digital Chart, but peaked at position 43 on the component Download chart.) |
| "You Are Falling All Night" (밤새 니가 내려) | 41 |
| "Still Parting From Us" (느린 이별) | 198 |

== Discography (Season 2) ==
=== My First Love ===
Released on October 16, 2022
| No. | Title | Lyrics | Music | Artist | Length |
|---|---|---|---|---|---|
| 1. | "My First Love" (나와 결혼해 줄래요) | Han Kyung-soo; Lee Do-hyung | Lee Do-hyung; Han Kyung-soo | Huh Gak; Shin Yong-jae (2F); Kim Won-joo (2F); Onestar; Son Dong-woon (Highlight); Juho; Kim Hee-jae | 3:33 |
| 2. | "My First Love" (Inst.) | | Han Kyung-soo; Lee Do-hyung | | 3:33 |

=== What I Couldn't Say To You ===
Released on October 23, 2022
| No. | Title | Lyrics | Music | Artist | Length |
|---|---|---|---|---|---|
| 1. | "What I Couldn't Say To You" (너에게 하지 못한 말) | Shin Hyun-woo; Kim Hyun-seok | Kim Hyun-seok; Shin Hyun-woo | Kim Hee-jae | 4:18 |
| 2. | "What I Couldn't Say To You" (Inst.) | | Kim Hyun-seok; Shin Hyun-woo | | 4:18 |

=== Make A Memory ===
Released on October 26, 2022
| No. | Title | Lyrics | Music | Artist | Length |
|---|---|---|---|---|---|
| 1. | "Make A Memory" (추억을 만들래) | Han Kyung-soo; Lee Do-hyung | Lee Do-hyung; Han Kyung-soo | Cha Ga-eul | 3:18 |
| 2. | "Make A Memory" (Inst.) | | Lee Do-hyung; Han Kyung-soo | | 3:18 |

=== Forest ===
Released on November 4, 2022
| No. | Title | Lyrics | Music | Artist | Length |
|---|---|---|---|---|---|
| 1. | "Forest" | Genja | Genja; Lee Seul | Ashatree | 3:02 |
| 2. | "Forest" (Inst.) | | Genja; Lee Seul | | 3:02 |

=== Save Me ===
Released on November 6, 2022
| No. | Title | Lyrics | Music | Artist | Length |
|---|---|---|---|---|---|
| 1. | "Save Me" (구해줘) | Shin Hyun-woo | Crazy Park; Shin Hyun-woo | Huh Gak | 3:45 |
| 2. | "Save Me" (Inst.) | | Crazy Park; Shin Hyun-woo | | 3:45 |

=== Someday ===
Released on November 9, 2022
| No. | Title | Lyrics | Music | Artist | Length |
|---|---|---|---|---|---|
| 1. | "Someday" (언젠가는) | Lee Do-hyung; Lee Ki-hwan | Lee Do-hyung; Lee Ki-hwan | 2NB | 3:35 |
| 2. | "Someday" (Inst.) | | Lee Do-hyung; Lee Ki-hwan | | 3:35 |

=== Only You ===
Released on November 13, 2022
| No. | Title | Lyrics | Music | Artist | Length |
|---|---|---|---|---|---|
| 1. | "Only You" (너야) | Juho; B.O.K | Juho; B.O.K | Juho | 3:53 |
| 2. | "Only You" (Inst.) | | Juho; B.O.K | | 3:53 |

=== Shining You ===
Released on November 16, 2022
| No. | Title | Lyrics | Music | Artist | Length |
|---|---|---|---|---|---|
| 1. | "Shining You" | Cho Tae-jung; Choi Eun-ho | Cho Tae-jung; Park Jung-joon; Choi Eun-ho | A+B | 3:34 |
| 2. | "Shining You" (Inst.) | | Cho Tae-jung; Park Jung-joon; Choi Eun-ho | | 3:34 |

=== My All ===
Released on November 20, 2022
| No. | Title | Lyrics | Music | Artist | Length |
|---|---|---|---|---|---|
| 1. | "My All" (너만, 너만) | Han Kyung-soo; Lee Do-hyung | Lee Do-hyung; Han Kyung-soo | 2F | 3:36 |
| 2. | "My All" (Inst.) | | Lee Do-hyung; Han Kyung-soo | | 3:36 |

=== My All ===
Released on November 23, 2022
| No. | Title | Lyrics | Music | Artist | Length |
|---|---|---|---|---|---|
| 1. | "My Answer is You" (내 답은 너) | Park Jung-wook; Kim Joon-il; Joo Jin-hee | Park Jung-wook; Kim Joon-il; Moon6uoy | Song Hee-ran | 3:05 |
| 2. | "My All" (Inst.) | | Park Jung-wook; Kim Joon-il; Moon6uoy | | 3:05 |

=== We Got Lost ===
Released on November 27, 2022
| No. | Title | Lyrics | Music | Artist | Length |
|---|---|---|---|---|---|
| 1. | "We Got Lost" (길을 잃었다) | Shin Hyun-woo | Kim Hyun-seok; Shin Hyun-woo | Lim Han-byul | 3:08 |
| 2. | "We Got Lost" (Inst.) | | Kim Hyun-seok; Shin Hyun-woo | | 3:08 |

=== Somewhere Only We Know ===
Released on November 30, 2022
| No. | Title | Lyrics | Music | Artist | Length |
|---|---|---|---|---|---|
| 1. | "Somewhere Only We Know" (우리 둘만 아는 세상) | Juniel | Lee Do-hyun; Juniel | Juniel | 4:11 |
| 2. | "Somewhere Only We Know" (Inst.) | | Lee Do-hyun; Juniel | | 4:11 |

=== Scent of Yours ===
Released on December 4, 2022
| No. | Title | Lyrics | Music | Artist | Length |
|---|---|---|---|---|---|
| 1. | "Scent of Yours" (겨울향기) | Son Dong-woon | Son Dong-woon; Lee Yong-gyu; Shin Sung-jin | Son Dong-woon (Highlight) | 2:58 |
| 2. | "Scent of Yours" (Inst.) | | Son Dong-woon; Lee Yong-gyu; Shin Sung-jin | | 2:58 |

=== Chart rankings (selected) ===
| Title | Peak chart positions |
| Title | KOR |
|---|---|
| "Save Me" (구해줘) | 137 |
| "Only You" (너야) | 138 |
| "We Got Lost" (길을 잃었다) | 169 |

== Discography (Season 3) ==
=== Old Song ===
Released on June 16, 2024
| No. | Title | Lyrics | Music | Artist | Length |
|---|---|---|---|---|---|
| 1. | "Old Song" (오래된 노래) | Egg1; Egg2; Egg3 | Egg1; Egg2; Egg3 | Huh Gak; Lim Han-byul; Kim Hee-jae; Lee Jin-sung (Monday Kiz); Lee Mu-jin; #Annyeong | 4:18 |
| 2. | "Old Song" (Inst.) | | Egg1; Egg2; Egg3 | | 4:18 |

=== First Love ===
Released on June 20, 2024
| No. | Title | Lyrics | Music | Artist | Length |
|---|---|---|---|---|---|
| 1. | "First Love" (첫사랑) | Epitone Project | Epitone Project | #Annyeong | 4:34 |
| 2. | "First Love" (Inst.) | | Epitone Project | | 4:34 |

=== This Way ===
Released on June 27, 2024
| No. | Title | Lyrics | Music | Artist | Length |
|---|---|---|---|---|---|
| 1. | "This Way" | bigguyrobin; Khac Hung | Khac Hung | Han All | 3:21 |
| 2. | "This Way" (Inst.) | | Khac Hung | | 3:21 |

=== Sorrow Thoughts ===
Released on June 30, 2024
| No. | Title | Lyrics | Music | Artist | Length |
|---|---|---|---|---|---|
| 1. | "Sorrow Thoughts" (애상) | Lee Seung-ho | Yoon Il-sang; Lee Do-hyung | Lee Mu-jin | 3:26 |
| 2. | "Sorrow Thoughts" (Inst.) | | Yoon Il-sang; Lee Do-hyung | | 3:26 |

=== Every Day, Every Moment ===
Released on July 4, 2024
| No. | Title | Lyrics | Music | Artist | Length |
|---|---|---|---|---|---|
| 1. | "Every Day, Every Moment" (모든 날, 모든 순간) | Shoulder Gangster | Shoulder Gangster | Lim Han-byul | 3:59 |
| 2. | "Every Day, Every Moment" (Inst.) | | Shoulder Gangster | | 3:59 |

=== My Old Story ===
Released on July 7, 2024
| No. | Title | Lyrics | Music | Artist | Length |
|---|---|---|---|---|---|
| 1. | "My Old Story" (나의 옛날이야기) | Jo Deok-bae | Jo Deok-bae | Kim Hee-jae | 3:56 |
| 2. | "My Old Story" (Inst.) | | Jo Deok-bae | | 3:56 |

=== Please Love Her ===
Released on July 11, 2024
| No. | Title | Lyrics | Music | Artist | Length |
|---|---|---|---|---|---|
| 1. | "Please Love Her" (그녀를 사랑해줘요) | Choi Gap-won | PJ | Lee Jin-sung (Monday Kiz) | 4:10 |
| 2. | "Please Love Her" (Inst.) | | PJ | | 4:10 |

=== It's Love ===
Released on July 14, 2024
| No. | Title | Lyrics | Music | Artist | Length |
|---|---|---|---|---|---|
| 1. | "It's Love" (사랑인걸) | Shim Hyun-bo | Shim Hyun-bo | Huh Gak | 4:17 |
| 2. | "It's Love" (Inst.) | | Shim Hyun-bo | | 4:17 |

=== Chart rankings (selected) ===
| Title | Peak chart positions |
| Title | KOR |
|---|---|
| "Old Song" (오래된 노래) | 27 |
| "Sorrow Thoughts" (애상) | 86 |
| "It's Love" (사랑인걸) | 113 |

== Discography (Season 4) ==
=== Like Yesterday ===
Released on October 20, 2024
| No. | Title | Lyrics | Music | Artist | Length |
|---|---|---|---|---|---|
| 1. | "Like Yesterday" (어제처럼) | Yoon Sa-ra | Shim Sang-won | Bang Ye-dam | 3:40 |
| 2. | "Like Yesterday" (Inst.) | | Shim Sang-won | | 3:40 |

=== At That Time ===
Released on October 24, 2024
| No. | Title | Lyrics | Music | Artist | Length |
|---|---|---|---|---|---|
| 1. | "At That Time" (기억을 깨워) | bigguyrobin | bigguyrobin; Choi Sang-eon | DK (December) | 3:30 |
| 2. | "At That Time" (Inst.) | | bigguyrobin; Choi Sang-eon | | 3:30 |

=== I Still Love You ===
Released on October 27, 2024
| No. | Title | Lyrics | Music | Artist | Length |
|---|---|---|---|---|---|
| 1. | "I Still Love You" (추억은 만남보다 이별에 남아) | Moon Sang-wook | Moon Sang-wook; Bang Min-gyu | Lee Jin-sung (Monday Kiz); DK (December); Yoo Hwe-seung (N.Flying); Bang Ye-dam; Woody | 4:08 |
| 2. | "I Still Love You" (Inst.) | | Moon Sang-wook; Bang Min-gyu | | 4:08 |

=== Love Dust ===
Released on October 30, 2024
| No. | Title | Lyrics | Music | Artist | Length |
|---|---|---|---|---|---|
| 1. | "Love Dust" (사랑 먼지) | Kim Tae-yoon | Hwang Seong-je | Lee Ye-joon; Kassy; Hynn; EB | 4:04 |
| 2. | "Love Dust" (Inst.) | | Hwang Seong-je | | 4:04 |

=== Making a New Ending for This Story ===
Released on November 3, 2024
| No. | Title | Lyrics | Music | Artist | Length |
|---|---|---|---|---|---|
| 1. | "Making a New Ending for This Story" (이 소설의 끝을 다시 써보려 해) | Xepy | Xepy; Master Key | Lee Ye-joon | 4:35 |
| 2. | "Making a New Ending for This Story" (Inst.) | | Xepy; Master Key | | 4:35 |

=== Like a Piece of Art ===
Released on November 8, 2024
| No. | Title | Lyrics | Music | Artist | Length |
|---|---|---|---|---|---|
| 1. | "Like a Piece of Art" (한 편의 그림처럼) | Park Joo-hyun (Rebuild) | Park Joo-hyun (Rebuild) | Kassy | 3:59 |
| 2. | "Like a Piece of Art" (Inst.) | | Park Joo-hyun (Rebuild) | | 3:59 |

=== Hate and Miss you ===
Released on November 10, 2024
| No. | Title | Lyrics | Music | Artist | Length |
|---|---|---|---|---|---|
| 1. | "Hate and Miss you" (미워하다, 그리워하고) | Choi Han-sol | Choi Han-sol; Mooon Si-eon (SSF Soundz) | Yoo Hwe-seung (N.Flying) | 4:23 |
| 2. | "Hate and Miss you" (Inst.) | | Choi Han-sol; Mooon Si-eon (SSF Soundz) | | 4:23 |

=== If It Were Me ===
Released on November 14, 2024
| No. | Title | Lyrics | Music | Artist | Length |
|---|---|---|---|---|---|
| 1. | "If It Were Me" (나였으면) | Kim Hyeong-seok | Kim Hyeong-seok | Hynn | 4:18 |
| 2. | "If It Were Me" (Inst.) | | Kim Hyeong-seok | | 4:18 |

=== I'm Gonna Change ===
Released on November 17, 2024
| No. | Title | Lyrics | Music | Artist | Length |
|---|---|---|---|---|---|
| 1. | "I'm Gonna Change" (고칠게) | 2soo | 2soo | Woody | 3:58 |
| 2. | "I'm Gonna Change" (Inst.) | | 2soo | | 3:58 |

=== Morning Star ===
Released on November 21, 2024
| No. | Title | Lyrics | Music | Artist | Length |
|---|---|---|---|---|---|
| 1. | "Morning Star" (새벽별) | bigguyrobin | bigguyrobin | Lee Jin-sung (Monday Kiz) | 4:08 |
| 2. | "Morning Star" (Inst.) | | bigguyrobin | | 4:08 |

=== The Sunlight Hurts ===
Released on November 24, 2024
| No. | Title | Lyrics | Music | Artist | Length |
|---|---|---|---|---|---|
| 1. | "The Sunlight Hurts" (햇살이 아파) | Egg1; Egg2; Egg3 | Egg1; Egg2; Egg3 | EB | 3:46 |
| 2. | "The Sunlight Hurts" (Inst.) | | Egg1; Egg2; Egg3 | | 3:46 |

=== Chart rankings (selected) ===
| Title | Peak chart positions |
| Title | KOR |
|---|---|
| "I Still Love You" (추억은 만남보다 이별에 남아) | 147 |
| "If It Were Me" (나였으면) | 110 |

== Discography (Season 5) ==
=== Emergency Room ===
Released on October 12, 2025
| No. | Title | Lyrics | Music | Artist | Length |
|---|---|---|---|---|---|
| 1. | "Emergency Room" (응급실) | Shin Dong-woo (Shin PD) | Shin Dong-woo (Shin PD) | Big Naughty | 3:38 |
| 2. | "Emergency Room" (Inst.) | | Shin Dong-woo (Shin PD) | | 3:38 |

=== Beautiful Fact ===
Released on October 15, 2025
| No. | Title | Lyrics | Music | Artist | Length |
|---|---|---|---|---|---|
| 1. | "Beautiful Fact" (아름다운 사실) | Kim Tae-won | Kim Tae-won | Huh Gak | 3:40 |
| 2. | "Beautiful Fact" (Inst.) | | Kim Tae-won | | 3:40 |

=== Amazing You ===
Released on October 19, 2025
| No. | Title | Lyrics | Music | Artist | Length |
|---|---|---|---|---|---|
| 1. | "Amazing You" (그대라는 사치) | Xepy; Rhymer; Cien | Xepy; Master Key; 1MAD | Jeon Sang-keun | 5:00 |
| 2. | "Amazing You" (Inst.) | | Xepy; Master Key; 1MAD | | 5:00 |

=== Last Love ===
Released on October 22, 2025
| No. | Title | Lyrics | Music | Artist | Length |
|---|---|---|---|---|---|
| 1. | "Last Love" (끝사랑) | Yoon Sa-ra | Yoon Il-sang | Kwon Jin-ah | 4:18 |
| 2. | "Last Love" (Inst.) | | Yoon Il-sang | | 4:18 |

=== A Chance Encounter ===
Released on October 26, 2025
| No. | Title | Lyrics | Music | Artist | Length |
|---|---|---|---|---|---|
| 1. | "A Chance Encounter" (어쩌다 마주친 그대) | Koo Chang-mo | Koo Chang-mo | Ash Island | 3:33 |
| 2. | "A Chance Encounter" (Inst.) | | Koo Chang-mo | | 3:33 |

=== Against All ===
Released on October 29, 2025
| No. | Title | Lyrics | Music | Artist | Length |
|---|---|---|---|---|---|
| 1. | "Against All" (비록) | Seunghoo | Pateko; Seunghoo; viewhorse; yeol | Bang Ye-dam | 3:48 |
| 2. | "Against All" (Inst.) | | Pateko; Seunghoo; viewhorse; yeol | | 3:48 |

=== Shiny Star ===
Released on November 2, 2025
| No. | Title | Lyrics | Music | Artist | Length |
|---|---|---|---|---|---|
| 1. | "Shiny Star" (밤하늘의 별을) | Kim Bom | Kim Bom | Huh Gak; Ken (VIXX); Kwon Jin-ah; Ash Island; Big Naughty; Bang Ye-dam; Jeon Sang-keun; #Annyeong | 3:44 |
| 2. | "Shiny Star" (Inst.) | | Kim Bom | | 3:44 |

=== Last Love ===
Released on November 5, 2025
| No. | Title | Lyrics | Music | Artist | Length |
|---|---|---|---|---|---|
| 1. | "Last Love" (마지막 사랑) | Cho Kyu-man | Cho Kyu-man | #Annyeong | 4:13 |
| 2. | "Last Love" (Inst.) | | Cho Kyu-man | | 4:13 |

=== When I Hold You In My Arms ===
Released on November 9, 2025
| No. | Title | Lyrics | Music | Artist | Length |
|---|---|---|---|---|---|
| 1. | "When I Hold You In My Arms" (너를 품에 안으면) | Adrian K | Adrian K | Ken (VIXX) | 3:51 |
| 2. | "When I Hold You In My Arms" (Inst.) | | Adrian K | | 3:51 |

=== Chart rankings (selected) ===
| Title | Peak chart positions |
| Title | KOR |
|---|---|
| "Emergency Room" (응급실) | 163 |
| "Last Love" (끝사랑) | 156 |

== Discography (Season 6) ==
=== In Trouble ===
Released on September 30, 2026
| No. | Title | Lyrics | Music | Artist | Length |
|---|---|---|---|---|---|
| 1. | "In Trouble" (큰일이다) | Kang Eun-kyung | Cho Young-soo | Tei; DK (December); Lee Seung-gi; Suho (Exo); Jongho (Ateez); Kim Hee-jae; Park Ji-hyeon | 4:02 |
| 2. | "In Trouble" (Inst.) | | Cho Young-soo | | 4:02 |

=== Let's Stay Well ===
Released on October 4, 2026
| No. | Title | Lyrics | Music | Artist | Length |
|---|---|---|---|---|---|
| 1. | "Let's Stay Well" (잘 지내자, 우리) | Cho Eun-young; Zitten | Zitten | Suho (Exo) | 4:10 |
| 2. | "Let's Stay Well" (Inst.) | | Zitten | | 4:10 |

=== I Love You ===
Released on October 7, 2026
| No. | Title | Lyrics | Music | Artist | Length |
|---|---|---|---|---|---|
| 1. | "I Love You" (사랑합니다) | Kim Tae-hoon | Wi Jong-soo | Chuu | 3:20 |
| 2. | "I Love You" (Inst.) | | Wi Jong-soo | | 3:20 |

=== To Some Degree of Love ===
Released on October 11, 2026
| No. | Title | Lyrics | Music | Artist | Length |
|---|---|---|---|---|---|
| 1. | "To Some Degree of Love" (사랑한 만큼) | Kim Young-hoo | Kim Young-hoo | Jongho (Ateez) | 4:37 |
| 2. | "To Some Degree of Love" (Inst.) | | Kim Young-hoo | | 4:37 |

=== You Don't Know Men ===
Released on October 14, 2026
| No. | Title | Lyrics | Music | Artist | Length |
|---|---|---|---|---|---|
| 1. | "You Don't Know Men" (남자를 몰라) | Kim Jin-ah | Lee Sang-joon | Lee Seung-gi | 4:33 |
| 2. | "You Don't Know Men" (Inst.) | | Lee Sang-joon | | 4:33 |

=== I Miss You So Much ===
Released on October 18, 2026
| No. | Title | Lyrics | Music | Artist | Length |
|---|---|---|---|---|---|
| 1. | "I Miss You So Much" (너무 보고싶어) | Red Shoes | Red Shoes | Lee Young-hyun (Big Mama) | 4:19 |
| 2. | "I Miss You So Much" (Inst.) | | Red Shoes | | 4:19 |

=== 180 Degree ===
Released on October 21, 2026
| No. | Title | Lyrics | Music | Artist | Length |
|---|---|---|---|---|---|
| 1. | "180 Degree" (180도) | VIP | VIP | Lee Ye-joon | 3:52 |
| 2. | "180 Degree" (Inst.) | | VIP | | 3:52 |

=== Because I Don't Love You ===
Released on October 25, 2026
| No. | Title | Lyrics | Music | Artist | Length |
|---|---|---|---|---|---|
| 1. | "Because I Don't Love You" (사랑하지 않아서 그랬어) | Park Kang-il (Rebuild) | Park Kang-il (Rebuild) | Sin Ye-young | 3:54 |
| 2. | "Because I Don't Love You" (Inst.) | | Park Kang-il (Rebuild) | | 3:54 |

=== Is It Still Beautiful ===
Released on October 28, 2026
| No. | Title | Lyrics | Music | Artist | Length |
|---|---|---|---|---|---|
| 1. | "Is It Still Beautiful" (여전히 아름다운지) | You Hee-yeol | You Hee-yeol | Tei | 4:25 |
| 2. | "Is It Still Beautiful" (Inst.) | | You Hee-yeol | | 4:25 |

=== Dear. My Fool ===
Released on November 1, 2026
| No. | Title | Lyrics | Music | Artist | Length |
|---|---|---|---|---|---|
| 1. | "Dear. My Fool" (바보에게 바보가) | Won Tae-yeon; Minuki | Minuki | Park Ji-hyeon | 3:58 |
| 2. | "Dear. My Fool" (Inst.) | | Minuki | | 3:58 |

=== Love 911 ===
Released on November 4, 2026
| No. | Title | Lyrics | Music | Artist | Length |
|---|---|---|---|---|---|
| 1. | "Love 911" (반창꼬) | Watt | Watt | DK (December) | 4:07 |
| 2. | "Love 911" (Inst.) | | Watt | | 4:07 |

=== Even Though I Hate You I Love You ===
Released on November 5, 2026
| No. | Title | Lyrics | Music | Artist | Length |
|---|---|---|---|---|---|
| 1. | "Even Though I Hate You I Love You" (미워도 사랑하니까) | Ryu Jae-hyun | Ryu Jae-hyun | Lee Young-hyun (Big Mama); Lee Ye-joon; Yuju; Chuu; Sin Ye-young; Lee Ye-ji | 4:44 |
| 2. | "Even Though I Hate You I Love You" (Inst.) | | Ryu Jae-hyun | | 4:44 |

=== Lalala ===
Released on November 8, 2026
| No. | Title | Lyrics | Music | Artist | Length |
|---|---|---|---|---|---|
| 1. | "Lalala" (라라라) | Kang Eun-kyung | MGR | Yuju | 3:17 |
| 2. | "Lalala" (Inst.) | | MGR | | 3:17 |

=== Summer Night You And I ===
Released on November 11, 2026
| No. | Title | Lyrics | Music | Artist | Length |
|---|---|---|---|---|---|
| 1. | "Summer Night You And I" (여름밤에 우린) | Egg1; Egg2; Egg3 | Egg1; Egg2; Egg3 | Kim Hee-jae | 3:22 |
| 2. | "Summer Night You And I" (Inst.) | | Egg1; Egg2; Egg3 | | 3:22 |
