= Seunghee =

South Korean singer (born 1996)

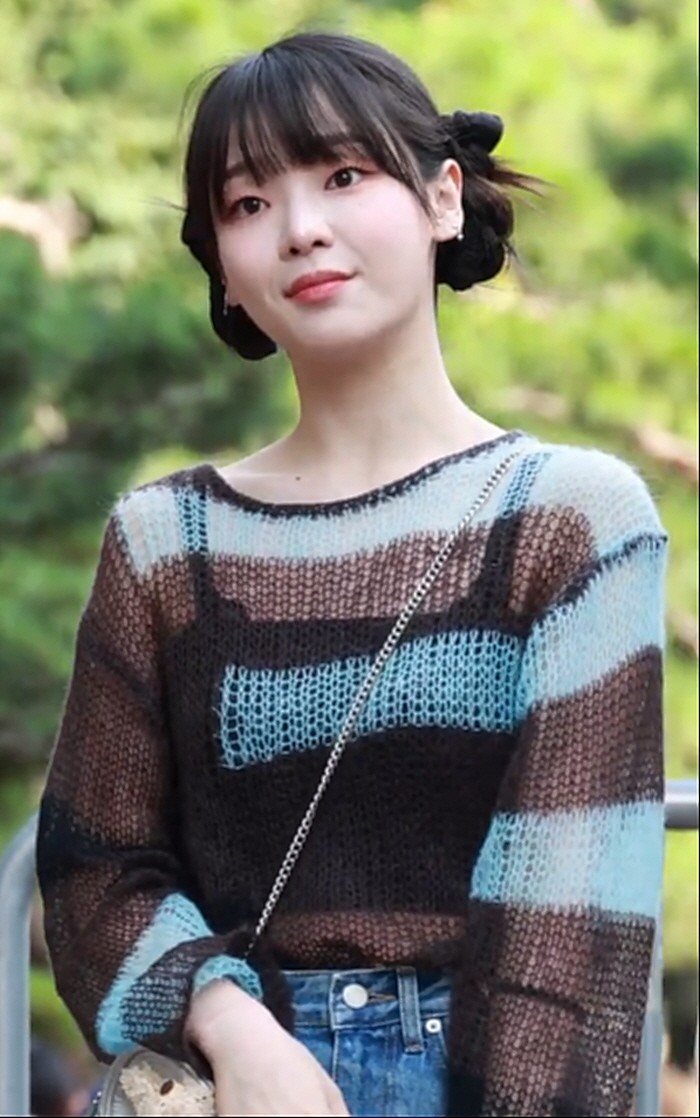
- Seunghee in 2023
- Born: Hyun Seung-hee; January 25, 1996 (age 30); Chuncheon, Gangwon, South Korea
- Occupations: Singer; actress
- Musical career
- Genres: K-pop
- Instrument: Vocals
- Years active: 2015–present
- Labels: WM; DSP
- Member of: Oh My Girl

Korean name
- Hangul: 현승희
- RR: Hyeon Seunghui
- MR: Hyŏn Sŭnghŭi

Hyun Seung-hee (Korean: 현승희; born January 25, 1996), known mononymously as Seunghee (Korean: 승희), is a South Korean singer and actress. She is a member of the South Korean girl group Oh My Girl.

== Career ==
=== Pre-debut ===
Seunghee was a regular name in various singing contests and reality shows, including KBS 1TV's Korea Sings (2007), where she won the Excellence Prize, SBS TV's Star King (2007), where she was known to the public as the "11-year-old Little BoA", and Mnet's Superstar K 2 (2010), where she made it to the Super Week but did not make it to the top 11 finalists round.

She became a Brave Entertainment trainee in 2012, but transferred to WM Entertainment two years later. In 2014, she became a credited backing singer for "Full Moon" by Sunmi.

=== 2015–2019: Debut with Oh My Girl & solo activities ===
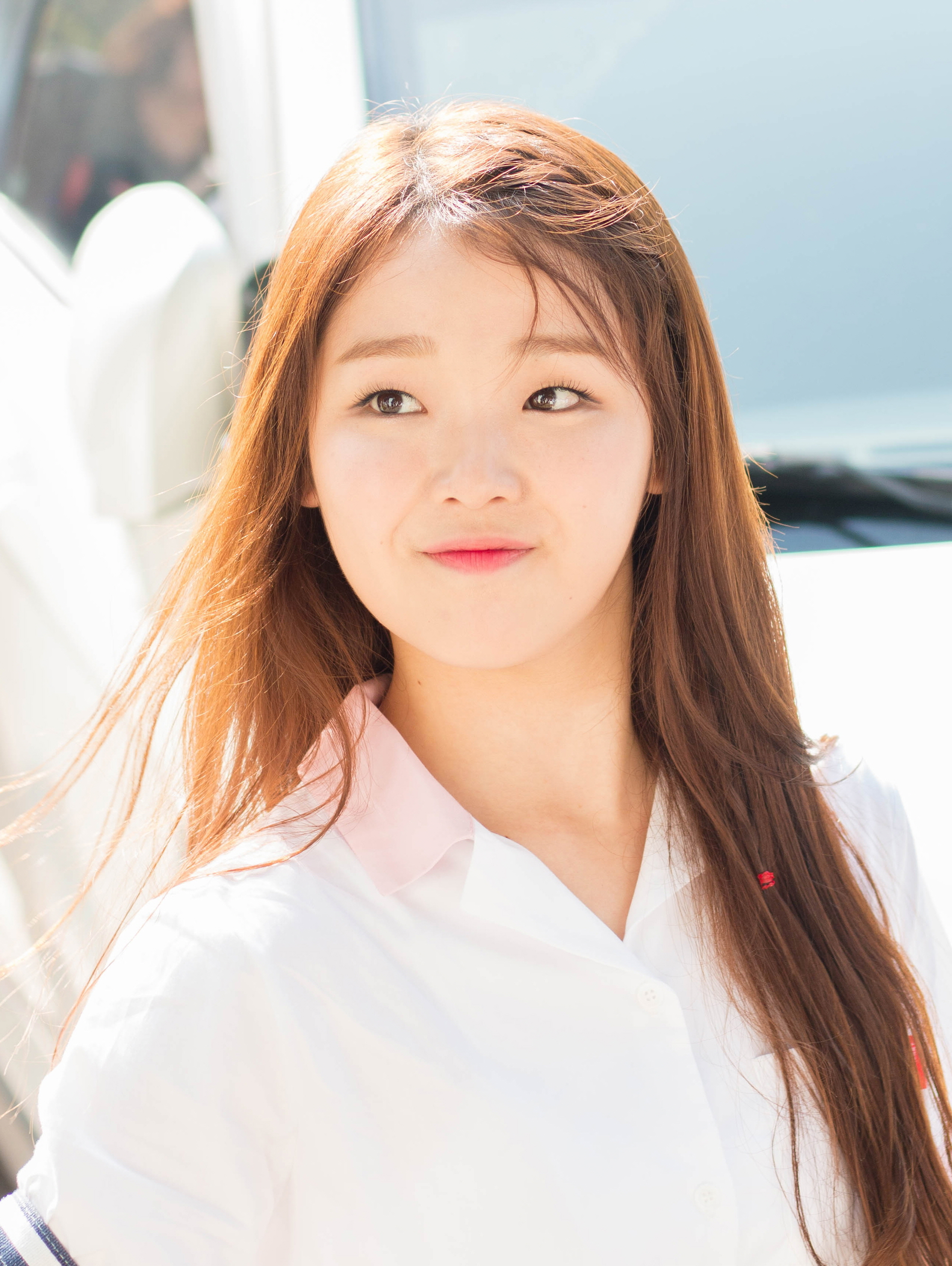
Seunghee in 2016

On April 20, 2015, Seunghee made her debut as a member of WM Entertainment's first girl group, Oh My Girl, with their first extended play of the same name. In July 2015, Seunghee made her acting debut in a web drama titled Loss:Time:Life.

In July 2016, she competed in Girl Spirit, a singing competition show that aimed to highlight the talents of vocalists from lesser-known girl groups.

In June 2019, Seunghee competed in King of Mask Singer under the name "Zoo".

=== 2020–present: Further solo activities ===
From November 2020 to January 2021, Seunghee starred in the sports variety show, Not Soccer or Baseball, alongside athletes Chan Ho Park and Lee Young-pyo.

From February to May 2021, Seunghee together with Kim Hee-chul, Shindong, and Lee Sang-min, hosted Friends, a television program that follows the daily lives of its cast while also showing the emergence of their friendships and romance.

== Philanthropy ==
In December 2022, Seunghee donated 20 million won by participating in the Million Angels Sharing event organized by the Korea Childhood Cancer Foundation to support children suffering from childhood cancer.

== Discography ==
=== Soundtrack appearances ===
List of soundtracks, showing year released, selected chart positions, sales figures, and name of the album
Title	Year	Peak chart positions	Sales	Album
Title	Year	KOR Circle	Sales	Album
"You Are"	2017	94	KOR: 22,186	Temperature of Love OST Part 1
"Fluttering Steps" (설레는 발걸음)	2018	— (Note: "Fluttering Steps" didn't enter the Gaon Digital Chart, but peaked at position 57 on Mobile Chart.)	—N/a	Welcome to Waikiki OST Part 5
"Who"	2018	—	—N/a	Lovely Horribly OST Part 1
"No one else like that" (Note: remake of More than Blue OST, sung by Lee Seung-chul (그런사람 또 없습니다))	2018	—	—N/a	My Only One OST Part 2
"Sunny Day"	2019	—	—N/a	He Is Psychometric OST Part 3
"Sleepless summer night" (언젠가 설명이 필요한 밤)	2020	—	—N/a	Bunny and Guys OST
"Dear My Nights"	2021	— (Note: Dear My Nights didn't enter Circle Digital Chart, but peaked 138 position on the Circle Download Chart.)	—N/a	The Great Shaman Ga Doo-shim OST Part 2
"Letter" (Note: cover of Kim Kwang-jin) (편지)	2021	— (Note: Letter didn't enter Circle Digital Chart, but peaked 58 position on the Circle Download Chart.)	—N/a	The Listen: Wind Blows
"Still Parting From Us" (느린 이별) (as part of "The Listen", along with Kim Nayoung, Kassy, Solji, Hynn)	2021	—	—N/a	The Listen: Wind Blows
"The day" (그날)	2022	— (Note: The day didn't enter Circle Digital Chart, but peaked 86 position on the Circle Download Chart.)	—N/a	After School Lessons for Unripe Apples OST Part 1
"My Finale"	2022	— (Note: My Finale didn't enter Circle Digital Chart, but peaked 150 position on the Circle Download Chart.)	—N/a	The Fabulous OST Part 3
"—" denotes releases that did not chart or were not released in that region.

== Filmography ==
=== Television series ===
Year	Title	Role	Notes	Ref.
2020	Turtle Channel	Bit-na	One-act drama	
2023	Oasis	Ham Yang-ja		
2024	Jeongnyeon: The Star Is Born	Cho-rok		

=== Web series ===
Year	Title	Role	Ref.
2015	Loss:Time:Life	Herself	

=== Television shows ===
Year	Title	Role	Notes	Ref.
2016	Girl Spirit	Contestant		
2019	King of Mask Singer	Zoo	104th Generation Mask King (Eps. 207–208)	
2019	Queendom	Herself	Contestant	
2020–2021	Not Soccer or Baseball	Cast member		
2020	All In	Cast member		
2021	Friends	Host		
2021	Upgrade Human	Host		
2021	The Listen: Wind Blows	Cast Member		
2022	Fantastic Family	Judge		
2022	My Teenage Girl	Host	Lunar New Year Holiday Special Items	
2022	National Science Representative	Host		

=== Web shows ===
Year	Title	Role	Notes	Ref.
2021	Delivery of Anything	Host	with Binnie	
2022	The Door: To Wonderland	Cast Member	Season 1–2	

=== Radio shows ===
Year	Title	Role	Notes	Ref.
2022	Jung Eun-ji's Gayo Plaza	Special DJ	March 9, 2022	

== Awards and nominations ==
Award ceremony	Year	Category	Nominee(s)/work(s)	Result	Ref.
KBS Entertainment Awards	2020	Best Entertainer Award	Not Soccer or Baseball	Won	
