= Monday Kiz =

Monday Kiz may refer to:

- Monday Kiz (band), South Korean boy band formed in 2005
- Monday Kiz (singer), Lee Jin-sung, South Korean singer born 1985
