= Kassy =

South Korean singer (born 1995)

- Kassy in 2021

Background information
- Born: Kim So-yeon; October 6, 1995 (age 31); South Korea
- Genres: K-pop; R&B; Ballad
- Occupations: Singer; Songwriter
- Years active: 2015–present
- Labels: Nextar; YMC

Korean name
- Hangul: 김소연
- RR: Gim Soyeon
- MR: Kim Soyŏn

Kim So-yeon (Korean: 김소연; born October 6, 1995), known by the stage name Kassy (케이시), is a South Korean singer-songwriter. Since her debut in 2015, she has released five extended plays and numerous singles. In 2016 she competed on the survival reality show Unpretty Rapstar 3.

== Discography ==
=== Extended plays ===
Title	EP details	Peak chart positions
Title	EP details	KOR
I Want Love (사랑받고 싶어)	Released: January 18, 2018; Label: Nextar Entertainment, YMC Entertainment; Formats: CD, digital download; Track listing: 1. "I Want Love" (사랑받고 싶어); 2. "Thought It Would Be Fine" (담담할 줄 알았어); 3. "Chiche" (뻔해); 4. "Don't Forget" (잊어가지마); 5. "Listen to This Song" (이 노랠 들어요); 6. "I Want Love" (사랑받고 싶어; instrumental)	—
Rewind	Released: September 5, 2019; Label: Nextar Entertainment; Formats: CD, digital download; Track listing: 1. "Story of Night Fall" (가을밤 떠난 너); 2. "Love Sunset" (우리 사랑이 저무는 이 밤) feat. Jay Moon (제이문); 3. "You and I in This Hard Day" (지친 하루 끝에 너와 나); 4. "Like a Dream" (꿈만 같은 일이야); 5. "Story of Night Fall" (가을밤 떠난 너; instrumental)	96
Memories of Autumn (秋 추억)	Released: October 26, 2020; Label: Nextar Entertainment; Formats: CD, digital download; Track listing: 1. "Are You Fine" (행복하니); 2. "Nap" (낮잠); 3. "If This Is Love" (이런 게 사랑이라면); 4. "You're a Good Love" (넌 참 좋은 사람이었어); 5. "Are You Fine" (행복하니; instrumental)	85
Old Story (옛 이야기)	Released: October 28, 2021; Label: Nextar Entertainment; Formats: CD, digital download; Track listing: 1. "Poem for You" (나 그댈위해 시 한편을 쓰겠어); 2. "Pure Love" (순애보); 3. "Yesterday" (예스터데이); 4. "Unavoidable" (어쩌면 우린, 최선을 위한 이별인걸까); 5. "Poem for You" (나 그댈위해 시 한편을 쓰겠어; instrumental)	—
Cold Day (추운날)	Released: November 29, 2022; Label: Nextar Entertainment; Formats: CD, digital download; Track listing: 1. "Cold Breeze Is Blowing" (찬바람이 불어오네요); 2. "Unbroken, Unbreakable" (마치 헤어진 적 없던 것처럼); 3. "Soulmate" (소울메이트); 4. "Brake Away" (헤어지고 말거야); 5. "Cold Breeze Is Blowing" (찬바람이 불어오네요; instrumental)	—

=== Single albums ===
Title	Album details
Love & Hate	Released: May 19, 2022; Label: Nextar Entertainment; Formats: Digital download; Track listing: 1. "Don't Wanna Leave Tonight" (늦은 밤 헤어지긴 너무 아쉬워); 2. "Hate You" (점점 지쳐가); 3. "Don't Wanna Leave Tonight" (늦은 밤 헤어지긴 너무 아쉬워) (Instrumental); 4. "Hate You" (점점 지쳐가) (Instrumental)

=== Singles ===
Title	Year	Peak chart positions	Sales	Certifications	Album
Title	Year	KOR	Sales	Certifications	Album
As lead artist
"In My Bed" (침대 위에서)	2015	—	—N/a	—N/a	—N/a
"Ooh Ooh Ooh" feat. Eluphant	2015	—	—N/a	—N/a	—N/a
"Hug Me" (쓰담쓰담)	2016	—	—N/a	—N/a	—N/a
"Dream"	2017	—	KOR: 14,869	—N/a	—N/a
"Let It Rain" (비야 와라)	2017	—	—N/a	—N/a	—N/a
"Listen to This Song" (이 노랠 들어요)	2017	—	KOR: 14,913	—N/a	I Want Love
"Your Memory" (사진첩)	2018	—	—N/a	—N/a	—N/a
"The Day Was Beautiful" (그때가 좋았어)	2018	3	—N/a	KCMA: Platinum	—N/a
"True Song" (진심이 담긴 노래)	2019	14	—N/a	—N/a	—N/a
"When Love Comes By" (이 마음이 찾아오면)	2020	136	—N/a	—N/a	—N/a
"Tock Tock" (똑똑)	2020	156	—N/a	—N/a	—N/a
"I Will Light Your Way" (너의 발걸음에 빛을 비춰줄게)	2021	32	—N/a	—N/a	—N/a
"Always Love You" (언제나 사랑해)	2022	4	—N/a	—N/a	—N/a
"Forever Love" (사랑이야)	2022	46	—N/a	—N/a	—N/a
"Crush on You" (사실말야내가말야그게그러니까말이야)	2023	32	—N/a	—N/a	—N/a
"Only You" (너 밖엔 없더라)	2023	85	—N/a	—N/a	—N/a
"Love Fool" (속는 셈 치고 다시 만나자)	2024	126	—N/a	—N/a	Full Bloom
Collaborations
"Blossom, Night" (벚꽃, 밤) (PK Heman & Dorothy)	2015	—	—N/a	—N/a	—N/a
"The Love of Fingertips" (손끝의 사랑) (B1A4, Seo Eunkwang, Lee Changsub, Hur Young Ji, A-Jax, April, Oh My Girl & Kassy)	2016	—	—N/a	—N/a	—N/a
"My Hero" (나의 영웅) (Leeteuk, Suho & Kassy)	2016	177	—N/a	—N/a	SM Station Season 1
"Close to You" (2BiC with Kassy)	2016	—	—N/a	—N/a	Fall in 2BiC
"Missing You" (니가 그리워) (2BiC with Kassy)	2016	91	KOR: 23,209	—N/a	Guess I Loved You
"See You in Heaven" (별똥별) (Kassy & Basick)	2017	—	—N/a	—N/a	—N/a
"A Song from the Past" (이 노랜 꽤 오래된 거야) (Solar & Kassy)	2020	58	—N/a	—N/a	—N/a

=== Soundtrack appearances ===
Title	Year	Peak chart positions	Sales	Album
Title	Year	KOR	Sales	Album
"Good Morning" (굿모닝)	2017	62	KOR: 85,005	Fight for My Way OST
"The Day I Dream" (꿈꾸던 날)	2017	—	—N/a	The Bride of Habaek OST
"At Beginning of Love" (사랑이 시작될 때)	2018	—	—N/a	Wok of Love OST
"Same Memories" (같은 기억)	2018	—	—N/a	Let's Eat 3 OST
"Take My Hand" (손을 잡아줘)	2018	—	—N/a	Webtoon "Yeonnom" OST
"Greeting" (마중)	2019	—	—N/a	Chocolate OST
"Love Me Like You Used To" (날 사랑한 처음의 너로 돌아와)	2020	186	—N/a	Start-Up OST
"Waiting for Spring" (오늘도 난 봄을 기다려)	2021	52	—N/a	Bimil:ier Vol. 2 "Waiting for Spring"
"Nothing Left To Say" (어떤 말도 할 수가 없는 나인데)	2021	111	—N/a	My Roommate Is a Gumiho OST
"One Sunny Day" (어느 햇살 좋은 날)	2021	107	—N/a	Hometown Cha-Cha-Cha OST
"You Are Falling All Night" (밤새 니가 내려)	2021	41	—N/a	The Listen OST
"Still Parting From Us" (느린 이별) as part of "The Listen", along with Solji, Kim Nayoung, Seunghee, HYNN	2021	198	—N/a	The Listen OST
"Aching" (아리운)	2022	—	—N/a	Alchemy of Souls OST
"Broke Up Today (2024)" (오늘 헤어졌어요 (2024))	2024	169	—N/a	Reunion Counseling OST
"Again"	2026			To My Beloved Thief OST

=== Other charted songs ===
Title	Year	Peak chart positions	Sales	Certifications	Album
Title	Year	KOR	Sales	Certifications	Album
"Story of Night Fall" (가을밤 떠난 너)	2019	3	—N/a	—N/a	Rewind
"Are You Fine?" (행복하니)	2020	79	—N/a	—N/a	Memories of Autumn
"Poem for You" (나 그댈위해 시 한편을 쓰겠어)	2021	33	—N/a	—N/a	Old Story
"Don't Wanna Leave Tonight" (늦은 밤 헤어지긴 너무 아쉬워)	2022	22	—N/a	—N/a	Love & Hate
"Cold Breeze Is Blowing" (찬바람이 불어오네요)	2022	110	—N/a	—N/a	Cold Day

== Filmography ==
=== Television ===
Year	Title	Network	Notes	Ref.
2016	Unpretty Rapstar 3	Mnet	Contestant	
2019	King of Mask Singer	MBC	Contestant as "Destiny" (eps. 201–202)	
2021	The Listen: Wind Blows	SBS	Cast Member	

=== Web ===
Year	Title	Notes	Ref.
2021	Bimil:ier (Secret Atelier)	Featured artist, Episodes 5-8	

== Awards and nominations ==
Year	Award		Nominee / Work	Result	Ref
2019	Brand of the Year Awards	Female Vocalist	Kassy	Won	
2019	3rd KY Star Awards	10 Million Song Logs	Kassy	Won	
2019	9th Gaon Chart Music Awards	Discovery of the Year – Ballad	Kassy	Won	
2019	Melon Music Awards	Top 10 Artists	Kassy	Nominated	
2019	Melon Music Awards	Song of the Year (Daesang)	The Day Was Beautiful	Nominated	
2019	Melon Music Awards	Best Ballad	The Day Was Beautiful	Nominated	
2020	34th Golden Disc Awards	Digital Bonsang	The Day Was Beautiful	Nominated	
2020	29th Seoul Music Awards	Bonsang (Main Prize)	The Day Was Beautiful	Nominated	
2020	29th Seoul Music Awards	Popularity Award	The Day Was Beautiful	Nominated	
2020	29th Seoul Music Awards	K-Wave Award	The Day Was Beautiful	Nominated	
2020	29th Seoul Music Awards	Best R&B Award	Rewind	Won	
2022	Melon Music Awards	Artist of the Year	Kassy	Longlisted	
2022	Melon Music Awards	Top 10 Artist Award	Kassy	Nominated	
2022	Melon Music Awards	Best Female Solo Artist	Kassy	Nominated	
