= Kim Sang-su =

South Korean baseball player (born 1990)

Kim Sang-su 김상수 金相豎

KT Wiz – No. 7
- Shortstop
- Born: March 23, 1990 (age 36); Seoul, South Korea
- Bats: Right Throws: Right

KBO debut
- April 4, 2009, for the Samsung Lions

KBO statistics (through July 21, 2026)
- Batting average: .271
- Home runs: 67
- Runs batted in: 721
- Stats at Baseball Reference

Teams
- Samsung Lions (2009–2022); KT Wiz (2023–present)
Medals
Men's baseball
Representing South Korea
2015 WBSC Premier12
Gold medal – first place	2015 Tokyo	Team

Kim Sang-su (born March 23, 1990) is a South Korean professional baseball shortstop currently playing for the KT Wiz of the KBO League. His younger brother Kim Sang-woo, was a member of the Korean boy band N-Train.

He was elected as the team's new captain following Park Han-yi on Dec. 20, 2016.
