= 35th Golden Disc Awards =

2021 South Korean music awards ceremony

- Title card
- Sponsored by: Curaprox
- Date: January 9–10, 2021
- Country: South Korea
- Hosted by: Lee Seung-gi; Park So-dam; Lee Da-hee; Sung Si-kyung

Highlights
- Disc Daesang Album of the Year: Map of the Soul: 7 by BTS
- Digital Daesang Song of the Year: "Blueming" by IU

Television/radio coverage
- Network: JTBC, JTBC2, JTBC4, Vlive

The 35th Golden Disc Awards ceremony was held from January 9–10, 2021. The show was aired on JTBC network from South Korea. It was held without a live audience due to the COVID-19 pandemic. Lee Seung-gi and Park So-dam served as hosts on the first day, Lee Da-hee and Sung Si-kyung on the second.

== Criteria ==
The first part of this two-day award ceremony highlighted the biggest digital releases in 2020. The second part, taking place on January 10, recognized achievements in the category of physical album releases. For judging the awards, music and albums released from November 2019 to November 2020 were considered. Those songs and albums which were excluded from the evaluation due to the judging count deadline in 34th awards were also included in this year's awards.

== Winners and nominees ==
Winners are listed first in alphabetical order and emphasized in bold.

Listing adapted from Golden Disc Awards.

Digital Daesang (Song of the Year)	Disc Daesang (Album of the Year)
**IU – "Blueming"**; Blackpink – "How You Like That"; BTS – "Dynamite"; Hwasa – "Maria"; Itzy – "Wannabe"; Mamamoo – "Hip"; Noel – "Late Night"; Oh My Girl – "Nonstop"; Red Velvet – "Psycho"; Zico – "Any Song"	**BTS – Map of the Soul: 7**; Baekhyun – Delight; Blackpink – The Album; Exo – Obsession; Got7 – Dye; NCT – NCT 2020 Resonance Pt. 1; NCT 127 – Neo Zone; Seventeen – Heng:garæ; Tomorrow X Together – The Dream Chapter: Eternity; Twice – More & More
Digital Song Bonsang	Album Bonsang
**Blackpink – "How You Like That"**; **BTS – "Dynamite"**; **Hwasa – "Maria"**; **Itzy – "Wannabe"**; **IU – "Blueming"**; **Mamamoo – "Hip"**; **Noel – "Late Night"**; **Oh My Girl – "Nonstop"**; **Red Velvet – "Psycho"**; **Zico – "Any Song"**; Apink – "Dumhdurum"; Baek Ji-young – "No love, No Heartbreak"; Baek Ye-rin – "Square (2017)"; Bolbbalgan4 – "Leo" (Feat. Baekhyun); Changmo – "Meteor"; Davichi – "Dear."; Hwang In-wook – "Sad Drinking"; Jessi – "Nuna"; Jin Minho – "Half"; Park Jin-young – "When We Disco" (Duet with Sunmi); Kim Na-young, Yang Da-il – "Goodbye List"; Lee Hi– "Holo"; Lim Young-woong – "Trust in me"; MC Mong – "Fame" (Feat. Song Ga-in, Chancellor); MC the Max – "Bloom"; Ovan – "I Need You"; Sin Ye-young – "Why Break Up?"; Sunmi – "Pporappippam"; Twice – "More & More"; Vibe – "Call me back"	**Baekhyun – Delight**; **Blackpink – The Album**; **BTS – Map of the Soul: 7**; **Exo – Obsession**; **Got7 – Dye**; **NCT – NCT 2020 Resonance Pt. 1**; **NCT 127 – Neo Zone**; **Seventeen – Heng:garæ**; **Tomorrow X Together – The Dream Chapter: Eternity**; **Twice – More & More**; AB6IX – Vivid; Ateez – Zero: Fever Part.1; Cravity – Season 2. Hideout: The New Day We Step Into; Exo-SC – 1 Billion Views; Itzy – Not Shy; IU - Love poem; Kai - Kai (开); Kang Daniel - Magenta; Kim Ho-joong – We Are Family; Mamamoo – Travel; Monsta X – Fatal Love; NU'EST - The Table; Red Velvet - Irene & Seulgi – Monster; Stray Kids – In Life; Suho - Self-Portrait; Super Junior-K.R.Y. – When We Were Us; SuperM – Super One; Taemin – Never Gonna Dance Again: Act 1; Wonho – Love Synonym #1: Right for Me; Woodz – Equal
Rookie Artist of the Year
**Enhypen**; **Kim Ho-joong**; **Treasure**; Cravity; Drippin; H&D; Lee Eun-sang; MCND; Sin Ye-young; TOO; WEi

=== Genre & Other Awards ===
Award	Winner
Best R&B/Hip-Hop Award	Changmo
Best Solo Artist	Jessi
Best Trot Award	Lim Young-woong
Best Ballad Award	Lee Seung-gi
Curaprox Popularity Award	BTS
QQ Fans Choice K-Pop Star Award	Exo
Performance Award	Stray Kids
Performance Award	(G)I-dle
Best OST	Jo Jung-suk
Best Group Award	Monsta X
Next Generation Award	Loona
Next Generation Award	The Boyz
Cosmopolitan Artist Award	NCT 127
Golden Choice	NU'EST
Trend of the Year	Zico
