= Monday Kiz (singer) =

South Korean singer

- 먼데이 키즈
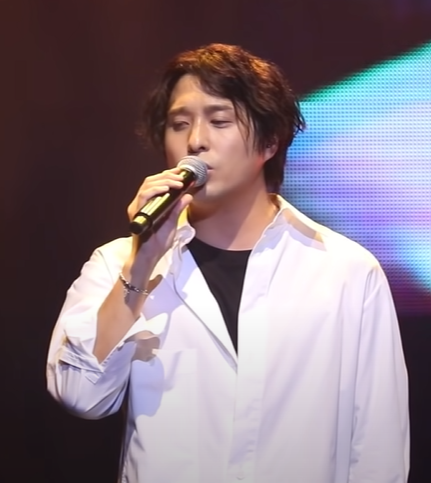
- Born: Lee Jin-sung; February 27, 1985 (age 40); South Korea
- Occupation: Singer
- Musical career
- Instrument: Vocals
- Years active: 2005–present
- Labels: Monday Kiz Company
- Website: mondaykizcompany.com

Korean name
- Hangul: 이진성
- RR: I Jinseong
- MR: I Chinsŏng

Lee Jin-sung (Korean: 이진성, born February 27, 1985), better known by the stage name Monday Kiz (Korean: 먼데이 키즈), is a South Korean singer and former member of Monday Kiz. He released his first album as a solo artist on May 3, 2016. Originally a duo of Lee Jin-sung and Kim Min-su, it was disbanded on August 4, 2008 when Kim Min-soo died in a motorcycle accident on April 29, 2008. It was re-engaged as a trio in April 2010.

== Discography ==
=== Extended plays ===
Title	Album details	Peak chart positions	Sales
Title	Album details	KOR	Sales
Reboot	Released: May 3, 2016; Label: Can Entertainment, KT Music; Formats: CD, digital download	21	KOR: 608

=== Singles ===
Title	Year	Peak chart positions	Sales (DL)	Album
Title	Year	KOR	Sales (DL)	Album
"Two Words to Kill" (두 번 죽이는 말)	2014	60	KOR: 54,672	Non-album singles
"Love" (사랑)	2015	34	KOR: 84,971	Non-album singles
"Your Voice" (너의 목소리)	2016	51	KOR: 36,734	Reboot
"In Your Arms" (그대 품에)	2016	—	KOR: 20,583	Reboot
"Hardest World" (하기 싫은 말)	2016	94	KOR: 23,357	Non-album singles
"Tears" (눈물) with Kim Na-young	2017	35	KOR: 42,548	Non-album singles
"If You Leave Me Now" (누군가를 떠나 보낸다는 건)	2017	—	—	Non-album singles
"When Autumn Comes" (가을 안부)	2017	31	KOR: 2,500,000	Non-album singles
"White Dress" (이별선물) with Kim Bo-kyung	2017	77	KOR: 19,564	Non-album singles
"My Love Has Faded Away" (사랑이 식었다고 말해도 돼)	2019	16		Non-album singles
"Another Day" with Punch	2019	20		Hotel Del Luna OST Part 1
"You Don't Know" (모르시죠)	2020	100		Dr. Romantic 2 OST Part 7
"White Snow" (흰눈)	2021	20		Non-album singles
"It Has to Be You" (너 아니면 안돼)	2022	26		Non-album singles
"Lonely Way Back Home" (집에 돌아가는 길 외롭다)	2022	127		Non-album singles
"Diary of Reminiscences" (추억 일기)	2022	82		Non-album singles
"Turn Back One's Love" (되돌리다)	2023	62		Non-album singles
"End of the Road" (이 세상 끝까지) (with An Nyeong)	2023	160		Non-album singles
"You You You" (너를 너를 너를)	2024	118		A Not So Fairy Tale OST
"Erasing You" (사랑했던 널 지우는 일)	2024	154		Non-album singles
"I Still Love You" (추억은 만남보다 이별에 남아) (with DK, Yoo Hwe-seung, Bang Ye-dam and Woody)	2024	147		Non-album singles
"Destiny (2025)" (너운명 (2025)) (with Lee Yi-kyung)	2025	35		Non-album singles
"—" denotes releases that did not chart.
