= Lim Han-byul =

South Korean singer and songwriter

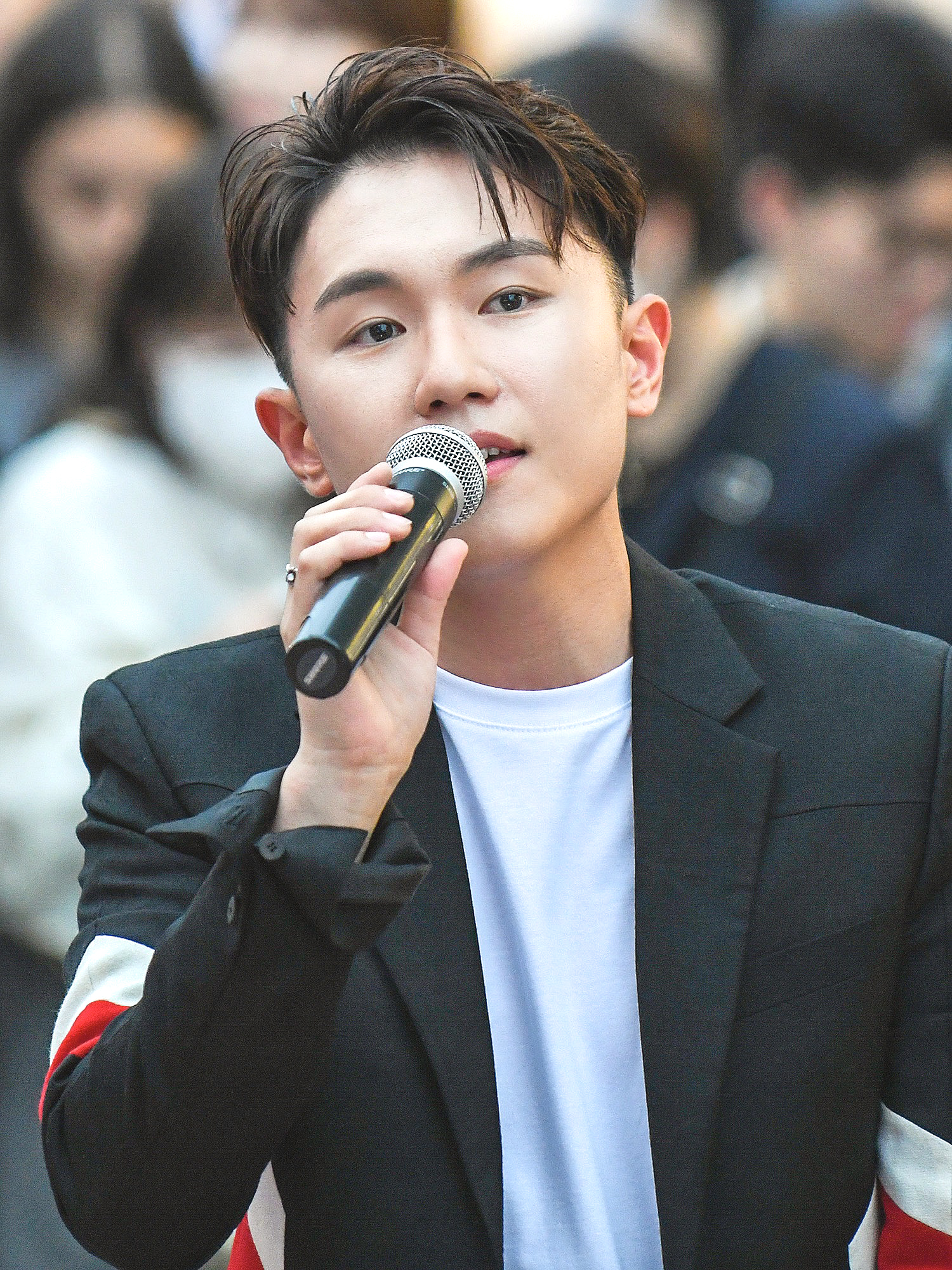
- Lim in June 2022

Background information
- Also known as: Onestar
- Born: 1989 (age 35–36)
- Origin: South Korea
- Occupations: Singer; songwriter
- Years active: 2008–present
- Labels: Flex M
- Formerly of: A'st1; Monday Kiz

Korean name
- Hangul: 임한별
- RR: Im Hanbyeol
- MR: Im Hanbyŏl

Lim Han-byul (Korean: 임한별; born 1989), also known by the stage name Onestar, is a South Korean singer and songwriter.

== Career ==
Lim made his debut in 2008 as a member of the DSP Media boy band A'st1. The group released only one extended play and disbanded the following year. Lim joined the existing group Monday Kiz in 2010 with the release of their fourth album, Ru:t. He left Monday Kiz in 2014. In 2015, Lim began uploading vocal covers of popular songs to YouTube, bringing him attention as a solo artist.

Lim made his solo debut on March 17, 2018, with the song "On the Way", released as part of the soundtrack to the South Korean TV series Misty. On September 13, he released his first single, "The Way to Say Goodbye". The song was certified platinum for 100 million streams in South Korea in 2020.

On June 13, 2023, a soundtrack album for the Disney animated series Hailey's On It! was released, featuring Lim on two tracks: "I'll Never Lose You Baby" and "Dance (Da Da Da Da)".

== Personal life ==
Lim married a non-celebrity woman on December 22, 2018, in Seoul.

== Discography ==
=== Singles ===
Title	Year	Peak chart position	Certifications
Title	Year	KOR	Certifications
"The Way to Say Goodbye" (이별하러 가는 길)	2018	24	KMCA: Platinum (st.)
"A Tearful Farewell" (사랑 이딴 거)	2019	84	
"May We Bye" (오월의 어느 봄날) (feat. Chen)	2019	68	
"I Can't Take My Eyes Off You" (넌 나의 전부)	2019	134	
"Good Love" (좋은 사랑이었다)	2020	185	
"Hello" (안녕, 오늘의 그대에게)	2020	65	
"This Song" (이 노래가 뭐라고)	2020	131	
"Heart of You, Story of You" (사랑한다 말로는 담을 수 없는 너)	2021	123	
"September 24th" (9월 24일)	2021	—	
"Shiny Star (Original)" (밤하늘의 별을)	2021	74	
"Prayer" (기도) (with Lee Hyuk)	2021	—	
"How About Me" (넌 나 어때) (with Park Woo-jin)	2022	—	
"On a Rainy Night" (비가 오는 밤이면)	2022	170	
"Beautiful Memories" (이별한 이유가 너무 아파)	2022	111	
"My First Love" (나와 결혼해 줄래요) (with Huh Gak, 2F, Son Dong-woon, Joo Ho and Kim Hee-jae)	2022	159	
"Get Ready to Leave" (떠나보낼 준비해 둘걸 그랬어)	2022	40	
"We Got Lost" (길을 잃었다)	2022	169	
"Hello It's Me" (안녕 나야)	2023	—	
"Because I Don't Love You" (사랑하지 않아서 그랬어)	2023	33	
"Happiness" (with Huh Gak and Shin Yong Jae)	2023	105	
"It Was Love"	2024	145	
"Old Song" (오래된 노래) (with Huh Gak, Lee Mu-jin, Lee Jin-sung, Kim Hee-jae and An Nyeong)	2024	27	
"T.B.H" (Ballad ver.; 고민중독) (with Huh Gak and Shin Yong Jae)	2024	78	
"Lonely Night" (혼술하고 싶은 밤)	2024	155	
"—" denotes release that did not chart.

=== Soundtrack appearances ===
Title	Year	Album
"On the Way" (그 길에)	2018	Misty OST
"Hee Jae" (희재)	2018	The Third Charm OST
"Maddening" (미치게)	2019	The Secret Life of My Secretary OST
"You Are As Pretty As A Flower" (꽃처럼 예쁜 그대)	2019	When the Camellia Blooms OST
"You're My End and My Beginning" (너는 나의 시작이자 마지막이다) (with Kim Jae-hwan)	2020	The King: Eternal Monarch OST
"Star" (별)	2020	Alice OST
"Like a Star" (별들 중에서)	2021	Mr. Queen OST
"What Should I Do" (난 어떡해야 해)	2021	How to Be Thirty OST
"Love Your Everything" (다 좋으니까)	2021	Police University OST
"Tears" (왈칵)	2022	Show Window: The Queen's House OST
"Leave Alone" (사랑하면 안 되는 사람)	2022	Curtain Call OST
"Please"	2023	The Heavenly Idol OST

== Filmography ==
=== Television show ===
Year	Title	Role	Notes	Ref.
2018	King of Mask Singer	Contestant	Green Monster	
2020	Lotto Singer	Contestant		
2021	Girls Planet 999	Vocal master		
2021–2022	Tomorrow's National Singer	Contestant		
2023	Boys Planet	Vocal master		
2023	Super Karaoke Survival: VS	Producer	with Soyou	
2024	Make Mate 1	Vocal coach		
2025	Boys II Planet	Vocal master		
