= N-Train =

South Korean boy band

- Origin: South Korea
- Genres: R&B, K-pop
- Years active: 2011–2013
- Labels: Media Line Entertainment
- Past members: Jungkyun; Seunghyun; Soul J; Yujin; Sangwoo

N-Train (Korean: 엔트레인) was a South Korean boy band, signed under MediaLine Entertainment. The group consisted of five members: Jungkyun, Seunghyun, Soul J, Yujin and Sangwoo.

== History ==
Prior to debut, N-Train trained with their agency for three years. In hopes to break the idol group image of recording dance-type music, MediaLine Entertainment directed their attention in recording R&B and soul-oriented music instead.

N-Train debuted with a mid-tempo ballad song, "울면서 울어 (One Last Cry)", on May 27, 2011. In one of their music reviews, a staff writer from Allkpop complimented their debut single, noting that "N-Train will find most of their appeal is surprisingly through their singing, because boy is it good." The writer compared Jung Jung Kyun vocal ability to TVXQ's Max.

== Members ==
- Seunghyun (승현)
- Jungkyun (정균)
- Soul J
- Yujin (유진)
- Sangwoo (상우)

== Discography ==
=== Extended plays ===
Title	Album details	Peak chart positions	Sales
Title	Album details	KOR	Sales
eNtrain	Released: May 26, 2013; Label: Media Line Entertainment; Format: CD, digital download	25	—

=== Singles ===
Title	Year	Peak chart positions	Album
Title	Year	KOR	Album
"One Last Cry" (울면서 울어)	2011	—	eNtrain
"I'll Forget You"	2012	—	eNtrain
"Come Back To Me" (내게 돌아와)	2013	—	eNtrain
"—" denotes release did not chart.

== Awards ==
Year	Award-Giving Body	Category	Work	Result
2011	Mnet Asian Music Awards	Best New Male Artists	"One Last Cry"	Nominated
