= Hynn =

South Korean singer (born 1998)

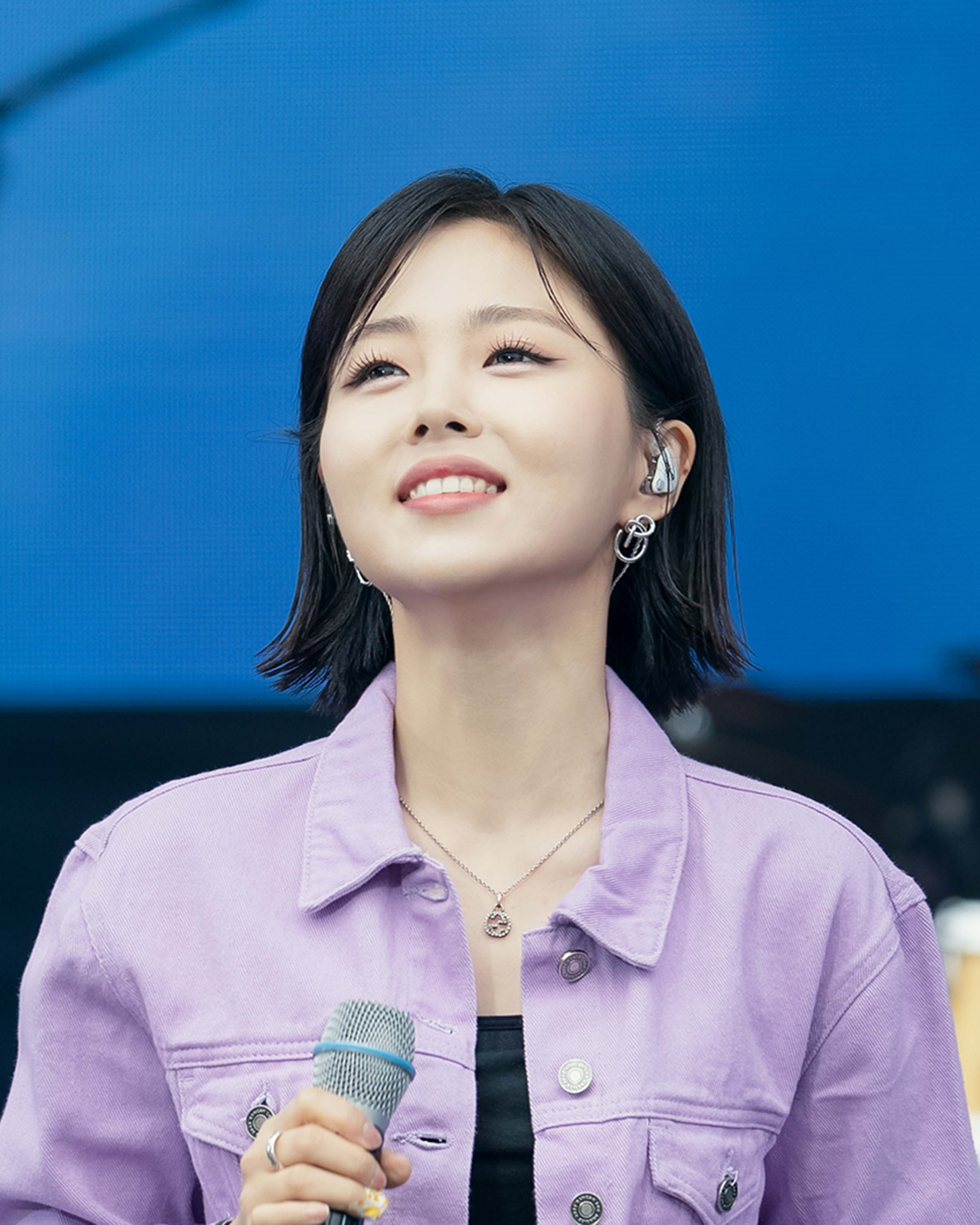
- Hynn in April 2023

Background information
- Born: Park Hye-won; January 15, 1998 (age 28); Incheon, South Korea
- Genres: Ballad
- Occupations: Singer, songwriter
- Years active: 2018–present
- Label: New Order Entertainment

Korean name
- Hangul: 박혜원
- Hanja: 朴惠媛
- RR: Bak Hyewon
- MR: Pak Hyewŏn

Stage name
- Hangul: 흰
- RR: Huin
- MR: Hŭin

Park Hye-won (Korean: 박혜원; born January 15, 1998), also known by the stage name Hynn (흰; stylised in all caps), is a South Korean singer and songwriter. She was a contestant in Superstar K 2016, where she finished in the top 3. On December 28, 2018, she made her official debut with the single, "Let Me Out".

== Career ==
Hynn first garnered attention when her song "The Lonely Bloom Stands Alone", released on March 31, 2019, had surged to the top 10 of various major real-time music charts six months after its release.

Hynn participated in MBC's King of Mask Singer in 2020, where she was crowned the Mask King once, and is currently the youngest female participant in the show's history to have been crowned the Mask King, at 22 years old.

She is also part of the seasonal South Korean all-female supergroup WSG Wannabe, which was formed through MBC variety show Hangout with Yoo. Under the supergroup, she became a member of the sub-unit Gaya-G, and with the song "At The Moment", she scored her first music show win in Show! Music Core on July 23, 2022.

== Discography ==
=== Studio albums ===
Title	Album details	Peak chart positions	Sales
Title	Album details	KOR	Sales
First of All	Released: November 23, 2022 (Digital), December 9, 2022 (Physical); Label: New Order Entertainment, Kakao Entertainment; Format: CD, digital download, streaming; Track listing: 1. Sweet Love (feat. Yangpa); 2. You Are My Life (기적); 3. My Love (내 사랑) (Duet. Car, the Garden) (Remastered); 4. Orpheus (이별이란 어느 별에) (feat. Jo Gwang-il); 5. Run (결승전); 6. Orpheus (이별이란 어느 별에) (Sleepless Night Ver.); 7. The Story of Us (끝나지 않은 이야기); 8. No More Goodbyes (그만할래, 이별하는 거); 9. You Are My Life (기적) (Inst.); 10. Orpheus (이별이란 어느 별에) (Inst.); 11. Run (결승전) (Inst.)	41	KOR: 2,642

=== Extended plays ===
Title	EP details	Peak chart positions	Sales
Title	EP details	KOR	Sales
Bad Love (차가워진 이 바람엔 우리가 써있어)	Released: November 12, 2019; Label: New Order Entertainment, Kakao M; Format: Digital download, streaming; Track listing: 1. Snow Flakes (눈꽃) (Prod. Rocoberry); 2. Bad Love (차가워진 이 바람엔 우리가 써있어); 3. Last Train (막차); 4. Dear My Friends; 5. Snow Flakes (눈꽃) (Prod. Rocoberry) (Inst.); 6. Bad Love (차가워진 이 바람엔 우리가 써있어) (Inst.); 7. Last Train (막차) (Inst.); 8. Dear My Friends (Inst.)	—	—
When I Tell You Goodbye (아무렇지 않게, 안녕)	Released: March 31, 2020; Label: New Order Entertainment, Kakao M; Format: Digital download, streaming; Track listing: 1. The Flower From Where You Passed (당신이 지나간 자리, 꽃); 2. When I Tell You Goodbye (아무렇지 않게, 안녕); 3. TO.DAY (오늘에게); 4. Colors of My Dream (여행의 색깔) (feat. 20 Years of Age); 5. The Flower From Where You Passed (당신이 지나간 자리, 꽃) (Inst.); 6. When I Tell You Goodbye (아무렇지 않게, 안녕) (inst.); 7. TO.DAY (오늘에게) (inst.); 8. Colors of My Dream (여행의 색깔) (feat. 20 Years of Age) (Inst.)	—	—
To You	Released: October 15, 2021 (Digital), October 28, 2021 (Physical); Label: New Order Entertainment, Kakao Entertainment; Format: CD, digital download, streaming; Track listing: 1. My Love (내 사랑) (Duet. Car, the Garden); 2. To You (Prod. Jung Key); 3. If I... (남자가 되면); 4. Promenade (우리 좀 걸을까); 5. Lullaby; 6. My Love (내 사랑) (Duet. Car, the Garden) (Inst.); 7. To You (Prod. Jung Key) (Inst.); 8. If I... (남자가 되면) (Inst.); 9. Promenade (우리 좀 걸을까) (Inst.); 10. Lullaby (Inst.)	66	—
Summer Haze (하계: 夏季)	Released: August 10, 2023; Label: New Order Entertainment, Kakao M; Format: CD, digital download, streaming; Track listing: 1. Europa (너에게로); 2. Grand Blue (너, 파랑, 물고기들); 3. Josee (조제); 4. Blue Bird; 5. Europa (너에게로) (inst.); 6. Grand Blue (너, 파랑, 물고기들) (Inst.)	66	KOR: 2,198
Unspoken Goodbye (영하)	Released: January 15, 2025; Label: New Order Entertainment, Kakao M; Format: CD, digital download, streaming; Track listing: 1. Unspoken Goodbye (영하); 2. Longing For The One I Lost (이미 지나간 너에게 하는 말); 3. Sunset Song (오늘 노을이 예뻐서); 4. Glowing Light (가장 찬란한 빛으로 쏟아지는); 5. Farewell (배웅); 6. Sunset Song (Japanese Ver.) (大人になっていくかも); 7. Sunset Song (Chinese Ver.) (粉紅的天空)	42	KOR: 1,905
Traces of Summer (여름결)	Released: August 13, 2026; Label: New Order Entertainment, Kakao M; Format: CD, digital download, streaming; Track listing: 1. Three Days After (3일 후); 2. Not Like the End of the World (운석이 떨어져 종말이 찾아온 것도 아닌데); 3. Written Ending (뒷장을 먼저 본 책처럼); 4. Misfit (어떤 이방인); 5. Title Role (주인공 연습)	40	KOR: 2,086

=== Single albums ===
Title	Album details
The Lonely Bloom Stands Alone (시든 꽃에 물을 주듯)	Released: March 31, 2019; Label: New Order Entertainment, Kakao M; Format: Digital download, streaming; Track listing: 1. The Lonely Bloom Stands Alone (시든 꽃에 물을 주듯); 2. Ballade for Spring (봄의 발라드) (with NILE); 3. The Lonely Bloom Stands Alone (시든 꽃에 물을 주듯) (Inst.); 4. Ballade for Spring (봄의 발라드) (with NILE) (Inst.)

=== Singles ===
Title	Year	Peak chart positions	Certifications	Album
Title	Year	KOR	Certifications	Album
As lead artist
"Stand Up For You"	2016	—	—N/a	Superstar K 2016 #8
"Move" (노래)	2016	—	—N/a	Superstar K 2016 Top 10
"Lonely Night"	2016	—	—N/a	Superstar K 2016 Top 7
"Let Me Out"	2018	—	—N/a	Non-album single
"The Lonely Bloom Stands Alone" (시든 꽃에 물을 주듯)	2019	7	KCMA: Platinum (Streaming) (Note: The single was certified Platinum for accumulating 100 million streams on May 7, 2020.)	The Lonely Bloom Stands Alone
"Bad Love" (차가워진 이 바람엔 우리가 써있어)	2019	30	—N/a	Bad Love
"Last Train" (막차)	2019	161	—N/a	Bad Love
"When I Tell You Goodbye" (아무렇지 않게, 안녕)	2020	72	—N/a	When I Tell You Goodbye
"TO.DAY" (오늘에게)	2020	—	—N/a	When I Tell You Goodbye
"Just Do This One Time" (한 번만 내 마음대로 하자)	2020	199	—N/a	Non-album singles
"With and Without You" (그대 없이 그대와)	2021	35	—N/a	Non-album singles
"I Wish" (바래)	2021	71	—N/a	Non-album singles
"To You"	2021	184	—N/a	To You
"If I..." (남자가 되면)	2021	—	—N/a	To You
"We Should've Been Friends" (친구라도 될 걸 그랬어)	2022	97	—N/a	Non-album single
"The Story of Us" (끝나지 않은 이야기)	2022	154	—N/a	First of All
"Orpheus" (이별이란 어느 별에) feat. Jo Gwang-il	2022	175	—N/a	First of All
"Run" (결승전)	2022	—	—N/a	First of All
"Heaven"	2023	109	—N/a	Non-album single
"Europa" (너에게로)	2023	—	—N/a	Summer Haze
"Grand Blue" (너, 파랑, 물고기들)	2023	—	—N/a	Summer Haze
"As Autumn Brings Cold Wind" (찬바람이 불면)	2023	—	—N/a	Non-album singles
"Go For It" (오늘도 응원할게)	2024	—	—N/a	Non-album singles
"If It Were Me" (나였으면)	2024	110	—N/a	Non-album singles
"Glowing Light" (가장 찬란한 빛으로 쏟아지는)	2024	180	—N/a	Unspoken Goodbye
"Sunset Song" (오늘 노을이 예뻐서)	2024	128	—N/a	Unspoken Goodbye
"Longing For The One I Lost" (이미 지나간 너에게 하는 말)	2024	—	—N/a	Unspoken Goodbye
"Unspoken Goodbye" (영하)	2025	—	—N/a	Unspoken Goodbye
"Wind That Blows" (그대가 분다)	2025	189	—N/a	Non-album single
"Title Role" (주인공 연습)	2026	—	—N/a	Traces of Summer
"Three Days After" (3일 후)	2026	—	—N/a	Traces of Summer
"Not Like the End of the World" (운석이 떨어져 종말이 찾아온 것도 아닌데)	2026	—	—N/a	Traces of Summer
As featured artist
"I Know" (알아) MC Mong feat. HYNN	2019	79	—N/a	Channel 8
"Is This Love?" (우리 사랑일까요) Jung Key feat. HYNN	2025	—	—N/a	Inferno
Collaborations
"No You, No Me" (헤어질 자신 있니) with NC.A	2019	68	—N/a	Non-album single
"Without You" (그대가 없어도 난 살겠지) with Kim Jae-hwan	2021	—	—N/a	Change
"Weekends Without You" (주말이 싫어졌어) with Kim Jae-hwan	2021	145	—N/a	Non-album singles
"The Season of Love" (바야흐로 사랑의 계절) with Lee Min-hyuk	2022	—	—N/a	Non-album singles
"At That Moment" (그때 그 순간 그대로 (그그그)) with WSG Wannabe Gaya-G (Note: Group members include Lee Bo-ram, Soyeon (Laboum) and Jung Ji-so.)	2022	1	—N/a	WSG Wannabe 1st Album
"When I Close My Eyes" (눈을 감으면) with WSG Wannabe	2022	32	—N/a	Non-album singles
"To You" (결국엔 너에게 닿아서) with WSG Wannabe Gaya-G	2023	32	—N/a	Non-album singles
"Love Dust" (사랑 먼지) with Lee Ye-joon, Kassy, EB	2024	—	—N/a	Non-album singles
"—" denotes release did not chart.

=== Soundtrack appearances ===
Title	Year	Peak chart positions	Album
Title	Year	KOR	Album
"Falling in Love"	2018	—	The Hymn of Death OST Part 3
"Feeling"	2020	—	Two Yoo Project Sugar Man Episode 12
"Whistle To Me" (휠릴리)	2020	—	Immortal Songs: Singing the Legend (Singers Born In The 90s Special)
"Track 9"	2020	—	Vol. 57 You Hee-yeol's Sketchbook: (34th Voice 'YHYS X HYNN (Park Hye-won))
"The Days With You" (이미 넌 고마운 사람)	2020	—	Vol. 58 You Hee-yeol's Sketchbook: (34th Voice 'YHYS X HYNN (Park Hye-won))
"Love Already Bloomed in My Heart" (그대가 꽃이 아니면)	2020	—	Tale of the Nine Tailed OST Part 6
"Bad Love" (차가워진 이 바람엔 우리가 써있어)	2021	—	Begin Again Open Mic Episode 16
"If It Was You" (너였다면)	2021	—	Begin Again Open Mic Episode 16
"Running In The Sky" (하늘을 달리다)	2021	94	Hospital Playlist OST Part 11
"Farewell Under The Sun" (대낮에 한 이별) with Yoo Hwe-seung (N.Flying)	2021	—	Vol. 114 You Hee-yeol's Sketchbook With you: 114th Voice 'YHYS X Yoo Hwe-seung (N.Flying), HYNN (Park Hye-won)
"Something Like That" (그런일은)	2021	—	Begin Again Open Mic Episode 22
"A Thought on an Autumn Night" (가을밤에 든 생각)	2022	—	Hidden Singer Season 7 Episode 6
"You Are My" (그대는 나의)	2023	—	King the Land OST Part 6
"White Night" (백야)	2023	—	The Seasons Vol.2 Part 9: AKMU's Last Goodbye Re:Wake x HYNN (Park Hye-won)
"Not Alone" (혼자가 아니야)	2024	—	Doctor Slump OST Part 2
"Memory" (상처)	2024	—	Nothing Uncovered OST Part 1
"Fighter" (파이터) feat. Nochexintoma	2024	—	The Fiery Priest 2 OST Part 1
"Hold Me, With Love"	2025	—	Good Boy OST Part 3
"Please Don't Stop" (멈추지마요)	2026	—	The Practical Guide to Love OST Part 3
"—" denotes release did not chart.

== Filmography ==
=== Television shows ===
Year	Title	Role	Note	Ref.
2016	Superstar K 2016	Contestant	Top 3	
2018	Hidden Singer	Impersonator	Season 5 Episode 8	
2019–2021, 2023	Immortal Songs: Singing the Legend	Performer	Ep. 428, 430, 437, 451, 516, 517, 592	
2020	King of Mask Singer	Contestant	as "Pearl" (Episodes 257-260)	
2021, 2024	The Listen	Cast Member	Seasons 1, 4	
2022	Hangout with Yoo	Cast Member	with WSG Wannabe	
2023	Begin Again - Intermission	Cast Member		

== Ambassadorship ==
- Public Relations Ambassador of the Incheon Education Bureau (2022)

== Accolades ==
=== Awards and nominations ===
Year	Awards	Category	Recipient	Result
2019	2019 Melon Music Awards	Best New Artist	HYNN	Nominated
2019	KY Star Awards	How Many Times Heartbreak Song Award	HYNN	Won
2020	34th Golden Disc Awards	Rookie Award	HYNN	Nominated
2020	29th Seoul Music Awards	Rookie Award	HYNN	Nominated
2020	APAN Music Awards	New Wave Award	HYNN	Won
2022	2022 MBC Entertainment Awards	Special Award - Variety Category (Note: Through WSG Wannabe sub-unit Gaya-G, alongside Lee Bo-ram, Soyeon and Jung Ji-so.)	Hangout with Yoo	Won

=== State and cultural honors ===
Name of country or organization, name of award ceremony, year given, and name of honor
Country or organization	Ceremony	Year	Honor	Ref.
South Korea	Korean Youth Hope Awards	2023	National Assembly Gender Equality and Family Committee's Commendation	
