= Sin Ye-young =

South Korean singer (born 1991)

- Born: December 3, 1991 (age 34); Seoul, South Korea
- Genres: K-pop; Ballad
- Occupation: Singer
- Years active: 2019–present
- Labels: Celebit; Studio O.D.R

Korean name
- Hangul: 신예영
- RR: Sin Yeyeong
- MR: Sin Yeyŏng

Sin Ye-young (Korean: 신예영; born December 3, 1991), is a South Korean singer. She made her solo debut on November 20, 2019, with the single "Why Break Up?". She released her first extended play (EP) Monologue on January 24, 2023.

== Discography ==
=== Extended plays ===
List of extended plays, showing selected details
Title	Details
Monologue	Released: January 24, 2023; Label: Kakao Entertainment, Celebit; Formats: CD, digital download, streaming

=== Singles ===
List of selected singles, showing year released, selected chart positions, and name of the album
Title	Year	Peak chart positions	Certifications (Note: In April 2018, the Korea Music Content Association introduced music recording certifications for albums and singles; pre-2018 releases are ineligible for certification.)	Album
Title	Year	KOR	Certifications	Album
As lead artist
"Why Break Up?" (우리 왜 헤어져야 해)	2019	41	KMCA: Platinum (Note: Certification for streaming)	Non-album singles
"I Think You're Not Missing Me" (넌 내가 보고 싶지 않나 봐)	2020	67	—N/a	Non-album singles
"I Miss U" (그리워하지도 말고, 찾아오지도 마)	2020	155	—N/a	Non-album singles
"Don't Apologize" (미안하다고 말하지 말아 줘)	2021	123	—N/a	Non-album singles
"Not Even a Call" (전화 한 번 못하니)	2021	81	—N/a	Non-album singles
"What Do You Think" (어떤가요)	2021	167	—N/a	Non-album singles
"A Breakup That I Knew" (흔하고 흔한 이별)	2022	— (Note: "A Breakup That I Knew" did not enter the Circle Digital Chart, but appeared at number 86 on the component Download Chart.)	—N/a	Non-album singles
"Can't Stay Apart" (오늘 밤이 지나면)	2022	122	—N/a	Non-album singles
"Last Love" (마지막 사랑)	2023	19	—N/a	Non-album singles
"I Miss You A Lot" (네가 보고 싶은 건 자연스러운 거겠지)	2023	23	—N/a	Monologue
"I'm Glad I Waited" (기다리길 잘했어)	2023	— (Note: "I'm Glad I Waited" did not enter the Circle Digital Chart, but appeared at number 70 on the component Download Chart.)	—N/a	Non-album singles
"Can We Get Back Together" (우리 만날까)	2023	— (Note: "Can We Get Back Together" did not enter the Circle Digital Chart, but appeared at number 44 on the component Download Chart.)	—N/a	Non-album singles
"How Are You" (그 거리)	2023	— (Note: "How Are You" did not enter the Circle Digital Chart, but appeared at number 73 on the component Download Chart.)	—N/a	Non-album singles
"You and I" (ふたり)	2024	—	—N/a	Non-album singles
"Farewell to Myself" (날 위한 이별)	2024	— (Note: "Farewell to Myself" did not enter the Circle Digital Chart, but appeared at number 45 on the component Download Chart.)	—N/a	Non-album singles
"With A Smile" (웃으며)	2024	141	—N/a	Non-album singles
"Goodbye Again" (다시 한번 우리 이별할 수 있기를)	2024	— (Note: "Goodbye Again" did not enter the Circle Digital Chart, but appeared at number 64 on the component Download Chart.)	—N/a	Non-album singles
"There's No Such Thing As Good Love" (좋았던 사랑이란 건 없어)	2025	— (Note: "There's No Such Thing As Good Love" did not enter the Circle Digital Chart, but appeared at number 102 on the component Download Chart.)	—N/a	Non-album singles
"Again"	2025	139	—N/a	Non-album singles
"The Closing Hour" (시간의 문이 닫히면)	2025	— (Note: "The Closing Hour" did not enter the Circle Digital Chart, but appeared at number 89 on the component Download Chart.)	—N/a	Non-album singles
"I'm Gonna Change" (고칠게)	2025	— (Note: "I'm Gonna Change" did not enter the Circle Digital Chart, but appeared at number 80 on the component Download Chart.)	—N/a	Non-album singles
"December 32" (12월 32일)	2025	— (Note: "December 32" did not enter the Circle Digital Chart, but appeared at number 20 on the component Download Chart.)	—N/a	Non-album singles
"First Love"	2025	—	—N/a	Non-album singles
Collaborations			—N/a	Non-album singles
"Bye, We Have to Breakup" (안녕 우린 헤어져야만 해) (with Jeon Sang-keun)	2021	53	—N/a	Non-album singles
"Someday, Sometime" (어느 날, 언젠가) (with Bong Gu)	2023	— (Note: "Someday, Sometime" did not enter the Circle Digital Chart, but appeared at number 76 on the component Download Chart.)	—N/a	Non-album singles
"And (그리고)"(with Zhou Mi) (Note: This song was also released as a Chinese Version with the title "If (如果)".)	2024	—	—N/a	Casting in the Corner Project
"Marry Me (결혼)" (with Gitae)	2025	— (Note: "Marry Me" did not enter the Circle Digital Chart, but appeared at number 44 on the component Download Chart.)	—N/a	Non-album single
"—" denotes a recording that did not chart or was not released in that territory

=== Soundtrack appearances ===
List of soundtrack appearances, showing year released, selected chart positions, and name of the album
Title	Year	Peak chart positions	Album
Title	Year	KOR DL	Album
"Be There"	2020	—	Missing: The Other Side OST Part 3
"It's Okay" (그곳으로)	2021	—	How to Be Thirty OST Part 3
"Why I Cry"	2022	—	Show Window: The Queen's House OST Part 6
"Windflower" (바람꽃)	2022	93	The Forbidden Marriage Webtoon OST
"I Don't Want to Say Goodbye" (헤어지기 싫어)	2022	123	Love Revolution Webtoon OST
"I'm in Love" (설레이는 중)	2022	—	Woori the Virgin OST Part 4
"It's All Just Lies" (다 거짓말일 뿐인걸)	2022	167	It's Beautiful Now OST Part 13
"Daydream" (백일몽)	2023	138	The Secret Romantic Guesthouse OST Part 3
"Can't Reach It" (닿을 듯 닿을 수 없구나)	2023	123	The Story of Park's Marriage Contract OST Part 5
"I Miss You Every Morning" (매일 난 헤어진 다음날)	2024	70	A Not So Fairytale Webtoon OST
"The Forgotten Memories" (사라져가는 모든 것들의)	2024	65	Our Summer OST

== Awards and nominations ==
Name of the award ceremony, year presented, category, nominee of the award, and the result of the nomination
Award ceremony	Year	Category	Nominee(s) / Work(s)	Result	Ref.
Golden Disc Awards	2021	Digital Song Bonsang	"Why Break Up?"	Nominated	
Golden Disc Awards	2021	Rookie Artist of the Year	Sin Ye-young	Nominated	
