= Monday Kiz (band) =

South Korean boyband

- Origin: South Korea
- Genres: K-pop, R&B
- Years active: 2005–2008, 2010–2014
- Labels: Can Entertainment
- Past members: Lee Jin-sung; Kim Min-soo; Han Seung-hee; Lim Han-byul

Monday Kiz (Korean: 먼데이 키즈) was a South Korean boy band formed in 2005. The group originally consisted of two members: Lee Jin-sung and Kim Min-soo, but after the death of Min-soo in 2008 the group reformed with two new members: Han Seung-hee and Lim Han-byul, accompanied by original member Jin-sung. Monday Kiz released their first album, Bye Bye Bye on October 6, 2005.

Lee Jin-sung currently promotes as a soloist using the Monday Kiz name.

== Members ==
- Lee Jin-sung (2005–2015)
- Kim Min-soo (2005–2008)
- Han Seung-hee (2010–2014)
- Lim Han-byul (2010–2014)

== Discography ==
=== Studio albums ===
Title	Album details	Peak chart positions		Sales
Title	Album details	KOR RIAK	KOR Gaon	Sales
Bye Bye Bye	Released: November 3, 2005; Label: Can Entertainment; Formats: CD, cassette	19	—	KOR: 15,453
El Condor Pasa	Released: February 1, 2007; Label: Can Entertainment; Formats: CD, cassette	3	—	KOR: 17,322
Inside Story	Released: April 3, 2008; Label: Can Entertainment; Formats: CD	11	—	KOR: 16,913
Ru:t;	Released: May 20, 2010; Label: Beyond Music; Formats: CD, digital download	—	6	
Nostalgia	Released: March 8, 2012; Label: Beyond Music; Formats: CD, digital download	—	5	KOR: 1,357
Unfinished	Released: October 15, 2013; Label: Beyond Music; Formats: CD, digital download	—	15	KOR: 1,587

=== Extended plays ===
Title	Album details	Peak chart positions	Sales
Title	Album details	KOR	Sales
Incompletion	Released: October 1, 2007; Label: Can Entertainment; Formats: CD	—	
Memories Cantare	Released: April 19, 2011; Label: Beyond Music; Formats: CD, digital download	10	KOR: 1,960
The Ballad	Released: December 12, 2011; Label: Beyond Music; Formats: CD, digital download	12	KOR: 1,720
Healing Activity	Released: October 25, 2012; Label: Beyond Music; Formats: CD, digital download	6	KOR: 1,870

=== Singles ===
Title	Year	Peak chart positions	Sales	Album
Title	Year	KOR	Sales	Album
"Bye Bye Bye"	2005	—		Bye Bye Bye
"A Man" (남자야)	2007	—		El Condor Pasa
"Transparent Tears" (투명한 눈물)	2007	—		Incompletion
"Shout With Your Heart" (가슴으로 외쳐)	2008	—		Inside Story
"Scatter" (흩어져)	2010	3	KOR: 1,770,075	Ru:t;
"Don't Go" (가지마)	2010	16	KOR: 1,014,197	Ru:t;
"Going Crazy" (미치겠다) (with V.O.S)	2010	12	KOR: 942,778	Non-album single
"I Love You and Remember Me" (사랑해 그리고 기억해)	2011	23		Nostalgia
"눈물을 움켜쥐고" (with Jang Hye-jin and Simon)	2011	17		Non-album single
"After This Night" (이 밤이 지나면)	2011	13		Nostalgia
"Love Is the Name" (사랑은 똑같다) (with Gavy NJ)	2011	16		Non-album single
"Shururub" (슈루룹)	2011	10	KOR: 712,418	Memories Cantare
"Heartburn (Remix)" (가슴앓이)	2011	36	KOR: 238,101	Memories Cantare
"Bing Bing Bing" (빙빙빙) (with Gavy NJ)	2011	25	KOR: 691,189	Non-album single
"The First Time I Met You" (너를 처음 만난 그때)	2011	22	KOR: 691,638	Nostalgia
"To the Next Person" (다음 사람에게는)	2011	18	KOR: 616,455	Nostalgia
"Broken Train" (고장난 열차) (feat. Juvie Train)	2011	20	KOR: 682,419	The Ballad
"Shadow" (미행)	2011	6	KOR: 626,140	The Ballad
"Holiday" (with Ilac)	2012	52	KOR: 219,359	Non-album single
"I Guess I Did" (그랬나봐)	2012	26	KOR: 482,984	Nostalgia
"Cold Coffee" (차가운 커피)	2012	52	KOR: 126,250	Non-album single
"Probability" (확률)	2012	25	KOR: 289,321	Healing Activity
"You & I"	2013	16	KOR: 317,988	Non-album single
"You" (그대여)	2013	13	KOR: 275,953	Unfinished
"Kiss" (입맞춤) (feat. Kikaflo)	2013	44	KOR: 108,553	Non-album singles
"Because of You" (그대라는 이유)	2014	19	KOR: 100,461	Non-album singles
