= Woody (singer) =

South Korean singer

- Born: Kim Sang-woo; February 2, 1992 (age 34)
- Origin: South Korea
- Genres: K-pop
- Occupations: Singer; songwriter
- Years active: 2011–present
- Label: Indian Label
- Formerly of: N-Train

Korean name
- Hangul: 김상우
- RR: Gim Sangu
- MR: Kim Sangu

Kim Sang-woo (Korean: 김상우; born February 2, 1992), also known by the stage name Woody (우디), is a South Korean singer and songwriter. He debuted in 2011 as a member of the boyband N-Train.

== Personal life ==
Kim's older brother is professional baseball player Kim Sang-su, shortstop for the Samsung Lions.

== Discography ==
=== Single albums ===
Title	Details
When You Alone	Released: April 7, 2024; Label: Golden Moon; Formats: digital download, streaming

=== Singles ===
Title	Year	Peak chart positions		Album
Title	Year	KOR	KOR Billb.	Album
"Yahae" (야해)	2017	—	—	Non-album singles
"I'm In You Out" with High Top of Bigflo	2017	—	—	Non-album singles
"Fire Up" (이 노래가 클럽에서 나온다면)	2019	1	1	Non-album singles
"Natural" (대충 입고 나와)	2019	15	44	Non-album singles
"Nothing's Gonna Be Changed" (지구는 멸망하지 않아)	2020	84	—	Non-album singles
"Say I Love You"	2022	26	—	Re:Wind 4Men Vol.04
"Nostalgia"	2023	13	—	Non-album singles
"Flower in the Desert" (사막에서 꽃을 피우듯)	2023	10	—	Non-album singles
"You and I Both" (너, 나 우리 둘이)	2024	— (Note: "You and I Both" (너, 나 우리 둘이) did not enter Circle Digital Chart, it peaked at number 74 on the component Download Chart.)	—	Non-album singles
"When You Alone" (혹시 세상에 혼자 남겨진 것 같다면)	2024	44	—	When You Alone
"Pinky Promise" (새끼손가락 걸고)	2024	173	—	Non-album singles
"Sadder Than Yesterday" (어제보다 슬픈 오늘)	2025	8	—	Non-album singles
"—" denotes release did not chart.
