= Kim Na-young (singer) =

South Korean singer (born 1991)

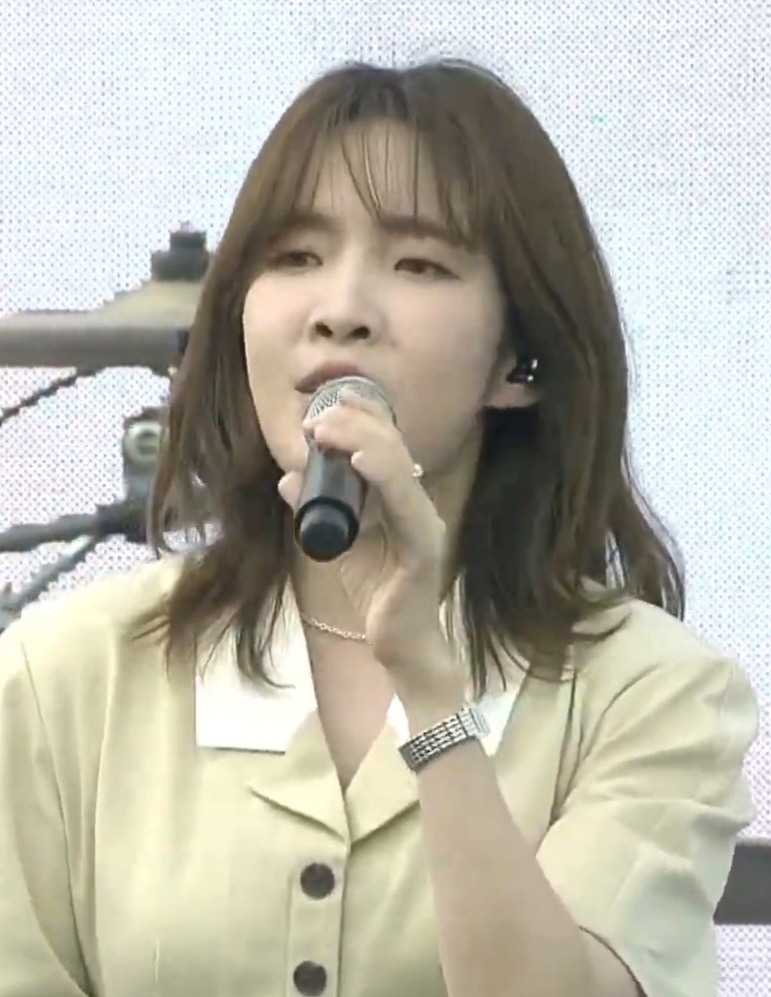
- Kim in 2023
- Born: December 31, 1991 (age 34)
- Occupations: Singer; actress
- Agent: Flex M
- Musical career
- Genre: R&B, ballad
- Years active: 2012–present
- Label: Neverland

Korean name
- Hangul: 김나영
- RR: Gim Nayeong
- MR: Kim Nayŏng

Kim Na-young (Korean: 김나영; born December 31, 1991) is a South Korean singer and actress who gained immense popularity through social media exposure on New Year's Eve 2015, when her single "What If It Was Going" topped Melon's (South Korea's biggest music streaming site) music charts, holding the top place for five days, and high spots on other streaming sites. She has recorded several soundtracks, including "Once Again" for Descendants of the Sun.

As a solo artist, she released three studio albums, 26 singles and 22 soundtrack appearances.

== Music career ==
She debuted as a singer in 2012, after which she took the unusual route of busking in the Hongdae area, where a video clip of her singing on a cold winter night went viral and attracted over 1 million views.

She has had a few TV appearances and was a contestant on Mnet's Superstar K in 2013, but did not reach the finals. From her appearance on Superstar K, her singing skills were noticed in the K-pop industry and she did a 2014 original soundtrack for a Korean drama.

=== New Year's Eve 2015 viral success ===
Her sudden rise in popularity, without being known much by mainstream media, occurred with the release of the viral video clip "What If It Was Going" and was called remarkable. Social media experts said the video's reception, which "spread like wildfire among young trendsetters," was because "mobile oriented social networks are changing the traditional routes to success for singers." She called the success, which coincided on her birthday, December 31, an unforgettable birthday gift.

=== Descendants of the Sun OST ===
She has recorded a number of soundtracks, including those for A Girl Who Sees Smells, Orange Marmalade and Bubble Gum. In March 2016, she and Mad Clown collaborated for a well received OST "Once Again" for Descendants of the Sun, and used as background music when the drama's leading roles flashed back to old memories.

=== 2019: First music show win ===
On June 23, 2019, she received her first music show win on SBS' Inkigayo with her single "To Be Honest".

=== 2020: Do You Like Brahms? ===
On September 21, 2020, the original soundtrack Kim sang titled "Dream" was released for the South Korean television series Do You Like Brahms? as the sixth part.

== Discography ==
=== Studio albums ===
Title	Album details	Peak chart positions
Title	Album details	KOR
From the Heart	Released: October 18, 2016; Label: Neverland Entertainment; Formats: CD, digital download; Track listing: 1. I See (그래 그래); 2. Sometimes (가끔 내가); 3. Watch Memories (꺼내본다); 4. Before We Met (너를 만나기 전); 5. Losing Myself (시들어가); 6. Heart (마음); 7. Never (그럴 리가); 8. What If It Was Going (어땠을까); 9. As You Told Me (니 말대로); 10. Road (길)	61
Inner	Released: November 15, 2018; Label: Neverland Entertainment; Formats: CD, digital download; Track listing: 1. A Sad Night (널 떠올리는 밤); 2. I Can't Say That (그 한마디); 3. I Want You; 4. Being An Adult (어른이 된다는 게); 5. Forget (이제 그만); 6. Like That (그렇게); 7. But I Must (헤어질 수 밖에); 8. May Be (그럴지도 몰라); 9. No Blame (널 미워하지 않길); 10. End of Love (우리 서로); 11. Miss U 12. I Can't Say That (그 한마디) (Inst.)	59
Me	Released: October 31, 2021; Label: Neverland Entertainment; Formats: CD, digital download; Track listing: 1. The Youngest Day; 2. We Were in Love (정말 좋았었는데); 3. Killing Me Softly; 4. The Face of Love (상관해줘); 5. For A Long Time (오랜날 오랜시간); 6. Free!; 7. My Faded Day (내 빛바랜 날들); 8. Moment (그 때); 9. Friend, Where Are You (친구야 넌 어디에)	—

=== Singles ===
Title	Year	Peak chart positions	Sales	Certifications	Album
Title	Year	KOR	Sales	Certifications	Album
"Street Life" with Jang Won-ki	2013	32	KOR: 96,582	—N/a	Superstar K5 – Kim Na-young vs Jang Won-ki
"If Winter Ends" (겨울이 지나고 봄이 오듯이) with MJ	2014	—	—N/a	—N/a	Non-album single
"I'm Sorry" (미안해) with Tricky and Shin Jong-wook	2014	—	—N/a	—N/a	I'm Sorry
"Sometimes" (가끔 내가)	2014	32	KOR: 71,513	—N/a	From the Heart
"As You Told Me" (니 말대로)	2014	42	KOR: 64,254	—N/a	From the Heart
"Never" (그럴 리가)	2015	67	KOR: 41,965	—N/a	From the Heart
"Believe Me"	2015	—	—N/a	—N/a	Non-album single
"What If It Was Going" (어땠을까)	2015	2	KOR: 804,640	—N/a	From the Heart
"I See" (그래 그래)	2016	99	KOR: 22,025	—N/a	From the Heart
"Watch Memories" (꺼내본다)	2016	25	KOR: 93,546	—N/a	From the Heart
"No Blame" (널 미워하지 않길)	2016	59	KOR: 59,974	—N/a	Inner
"Tears" (눈물) with Monday Kiz	2017	35	KOR: 42,548+	—N/a	Non-album single
"Being an Adult" (어른이 된다는 게)	2017	40	KOR: 58,811	—N/a	Inner
"Love Sick" (사랑앓이) with F.T. Island	2017	18	KOR: 68,049+	—N/a	Over 10 Years
"But I Must" (헤어질 수 밖에)	2017	24	KOR: 278,883	—N/a	Inner
"Miss You"	2017	84	—N/a	—N/a	Inner
"Each of Us" (우리 서로)	2018	38	—N/a	—N/a	Inner
"I Can't Say That" (그 한마디)	2018	—	—N/a	—N/a	Inner
"Incorrect Answer" (오답) feat. Lee Min-hyuk of BtoB	2018	80	—N/a	—N/a	Non-album singles
"To Be Honest" (솔직하게 말해서 나)	2019	1	—N/a	KMCA: Platinum	Non-album singles
"Goodbye List" (헤어진 우리가 지켜야 할 것들) with Yang Da-il	2019	4	—N/a	—N/a	Non-album singles
"Not Anyone Else" (다른 누구 말고 너야)	2020	53	—N/a	—N/a	Non-album singles
"Farewell Poem" (니가 없다면)	2020	116	—N/a	—N/a	Non-album singles
"A Letter for You" (봄 내음보다 너를)	2021	118	—N/a	—N/a	Non-album singles
"The Day I Loved You" (사랑했던 날)	2021	106	—N/a	—N/a	Non-album singles
"The Youngest Day"	2021	123	—N/a	—N/a	Me
"Press" (누른다)	2022	—	—N/a	—N/a	Non-album singles
"Dial Your Number" (너의 번호를 누르고)	2022	44	—N/a	—N/a	Non-album singles
"I Can't Help It" (어쩔 수가 없나 봐)	2022	177	—N/a	—N/a	Non-album singles
"I Can't" (못해)	2022	57	—N/a	—N/a	Re:Wind 4Men Vol.02
"Not Lonely" (외롭지 않아)	2023	139	—N/a	—N/a	Non-album singles
"The Day" (내일 이별) (with Shin Yong-jae)	2024	142	—N/a	—N/a	Non-album singles
"Love Illusion" (이별 자서전)	2024	—	—N/a	—N/a	Non-album singles
"Only You Know" (너만이 알아볼 마음)	2025	—	—N/a	—N/a	Non-album singles
"—" denotes releases that did not chart.

=== Soundtrack appearances ===
Title	Year	Peak chart positions	Sales	Album
Title	Year	KOR	Sales	Album
"You Let Me Go With a Smile" with Lee Eun-ha	2014	—	—N/a	Trot Lovers OST
"Hope and Hope" (바라고 바라고)	2014	—	—N/a	Marriage, Not Dating OST
"Ordinary Farewell" (흔한 이별) with Song Yu-bin	2015	—	—N/a	A Girl Who Sees Smells OST
"If I Did" (그랬다면)	2015	—	—N/a	Orange Marmalade OST
"To Me, You" (내겐 그대)	2015	—	—N/a	Bubble Gum OST
"Once Again" (다시 너를) with Mad Clown	2016	2	KOR: 813,800	Descendants of the Sun OST
"Say Goodbye (My Heart Speaks)" (가슴이 말해)	2016	28	KOR: 150,245	Uncontrollably Fond OST
"I'm OK" (괜찮다고)	2017	—	—N/a	The Emperor: Owner of the Mask OST
"If Only" (그럴걸)	2017	—	—N/a	Love Playlist 2 OST
"Maze" (미로)	2017	49	KOR: 58,717	While You Were Sleeping OST
"The Package" with DinDin	2017	—	—N/a	The Package OST
"Because I Only See You" (그대만 보여서)	2018	80	—N/a	What's Wrong with Secretary Kim OST
"Tell Me" (말해줘요)	2018	—	—N/a	Are You Human? OST
"Close I'll Be" (너의 모든 기억속에)	2019	106	—N/a	Romance Is a Bonus Book OST
"I Get a Little Bit Lonely" (조금 더 외로워지겠지)	2019	43	—N/a	Search: WWW OST
"At That Time" (그 무렵)	2019	111	—N/a	When the Camellia Blooms OST
"Heart Break" with Gaeko of Dynamic Duo	2020	—	—N/a	The King: Eternal Monarch OST
"Like the Winter That Loved Spring" (봄날을 사랑한 겨울처럼)	2020	—	—N/a	Men Are Men OST
"Dream" (그리워하면 그댈 만날까봐)	2020	110	—N/a	Do You Like Brahms? OST
"Where Are You" (그대는 어디에)	2021	141	—N/a	Run On OST
"My All" (우연이 아닌것만 같아서)	2021	—	—N/a	My Roommate Is a Gumiho OST
"There for You" (이별후회)	2021	30	—N/a	Our Beloved Summer OST
"Love Hurts a Little More" (조금 더 아파도)	2022	—	—N/a	Forecasting Love and Weather OST
"Breath" (숨결)	2022	—	—N/a	Alchemy of Souls OST
"You Are the Sea" (너는 바다)	2022	—	—N/a	Curtain Call OST
"Good Person" (좋은 사람)	2024	138	—N/a	Welcome to Samdal-ri OST
"From Bottom of My Heart" (일기)	2024	102	—N/a	Queen of Tears OST
"—" denotes releases that did not chart.

== Filmography ==
=== Television shows ===
Year	Title	Role	Notes	Ref.
2021	The Listen: Wind Blows	Cast Member		

=== Variety shows ===
Year	Title	Role	Notes	Ref.
2016-2021	King of Mask Singer	Contestant	As "Weightlifter Girl Kim Mask" (Ep. 87 -83) and as "Brother's Wife" (Ep. 293-294)	TBA

== Awards and nominations ==
Name of the award ceremony, year presented, category, nominee of the award, and the result of the nomination
Award ceremony	Year	Category	Nominee / Work	Result	Ref.
Golden Disc Awards	2020	Digital Song Bonsang	"Goodbye List" (duet with Yang Da-il)	Nominated	
Seoul Music Awards	2020	Bonsang Award	"Goodbye List" (duet with Yang Da-il)	Nominated	
