= Exo Planet 5 – Exploration (album) =

2020 live album by Exo

Exo Planet #5 - Exploration
- Digital cover

Live album by Exo
- Released: April 21, 2020
- Recorded: 2019
- Venue: KSPO Dome, Seoul; Yokohama Arena
- Studio: SM Big Shot; SM LVYIN; SM Blue Cup; SM Blue Ocean; SM Booming System; SM Concert Hall; SM Yellow Tail
- Genre: K-pop; R&B; hip hop
- Length: 96:13
- Language: Korean; English
- Label: SM; Dreamus; Avex Trax

Exo chronology
Obsession (2019)	Exo Planet #5 - Exploration (2020)	Don't Fight the Feeling (2021)

Exo Planet #5 - Exploration (stylized as EXO PLANET #5 – EXplOration) is the fourth live album by South Korean-Chinese boy band Exo. It was released on April 21, 2020, by SM Entertainment and distributed by Dreamus.

== Track listing ==
CD1
No.	Title	Length
1.	"EXplOration"	1:05
2.	"Tempo"	3:45
3.	"Transformer"	3:44
4.	"Gravity"	4:00
5.	"Sign"	3:20
6.	"UN Village" (Baekhyun's solo)	4:04
7.	"24/7"	4:20
8.	"Love Shot"	3:24
9.	"Ooh La La La" (닿은 순간)	3:14
10.	"Monster"	3:45
11.	"Oasis" (오아시스)	3:55
12.	"Been Through" (지나갈 테니) (Suho's solo)	3:31
13.	"Lights Out" (Chen's solo)	4:19
Total length:		46:26

CD2
No.	Title	Length
1.	"What a Life"	3:26
2.	"Closer to You"	2:08
3.	"Falling for You"	3:27
4.	"Wait"	4:12
5.	"Power"	5:52
6.	"Confession" (Kai's solo)	3:56
7.	"Bad Dream" (후폭풍)	3:57
8.	"Damage"	4:18
9.	"Growl" (으르렁)	2:05
10.	"Overdose" (중독)	2:27
11.	"Call Me Baby"	3:47
12.	"Unfair" (불공평해)	2:59
13.	"On the Snow" (발자국)	3:33
14.	"Smile on my Face" (여기 있을게)	3:40
Total length:		49:47

== Release history ==
Release history for Exo Planet #5 - Exploration
Region	Date	Version	Format	Label	Ref
Japan	February 26, 2020	Japanese	DVD; Blu-ray	Avex Trax	
South Korea	April 21, 2020	Korean	CD	SM; Dreamus	
Various	April 21, 2020	Korean	Digital download; streaming	SM	

== See also ==
- Exo Planet 5 – Exploration
