= Telephone (Exo-SC song) =

Single by Exo-SC featuring 10cm

from the album 1 Billion Views
- Language: Korean
- Released: July 7, 2020
- Recorded: 2020
- Studio: PYT (Seoul); SM Big Shot (Seoul)
- Genre: Hip-hop
- Length: 3:16
- Label: SM; Dreamus
- Composers: Loey; MQ; Jeon Yong-joon; Yunji; Gaeko; Oh Se-hun
- Lyricists: Loey; MQ; Jeon Yong-joon; Yunji; Gaeko; Oh Se-hun
- Producer: Studio 159

Exo-SC singles chronology
"Closer to You" (2019)	"Telephone" (2020)	"1 Billion Views" (2020)

10cm singles chronology
"Do You Think of Me?" (2019)	"Telephone" (2020)	"Tight" (2019)

Music video
- "Telephone" on YouTube

"Telephone" (Korean: 척; RR: Cheok; lit. 'Chuck') is a song recorded by South Korean duo Exo-SC, a subgroup to the boy band Exo, and features 10cm as the guest vocalist. It was released on July 7, 2020, by SM Entertainment and distributed by Dreamus as a pre-release single for their debut studio album, 1 Billion Views.

== Background ==
Shortly after releasing their debut EP the previous year, Exo-SC embarked on Exo's fifth headlining concert tour, Exo Planet 5 – Exploration, performing "What a Life", "Closer to You".

On June 23, 2020, SM announced that the group will release their debut studio album, 1 Billion Views in July.

On July 1, SM uploaded a schedule poster of the comeback, which features the track list of the album, where "Telephone" is included among the nine tracks. The song and its music video was released on July 7.

The release of "Telephone" was described as "surprising" since the song was previously unannounced. Chanyeol said it was a way for the duo to gift the fans who were patiently waiting for the comeback — so they played the song in advance during their live broadcast before officially announcing what just happened.

== Composition ==
"Telephone" is a hip-hop song with a cheerful piano riff and heavy bass. It was co-composed and co-written by member Sehun, Gaeko, and Studio 159.

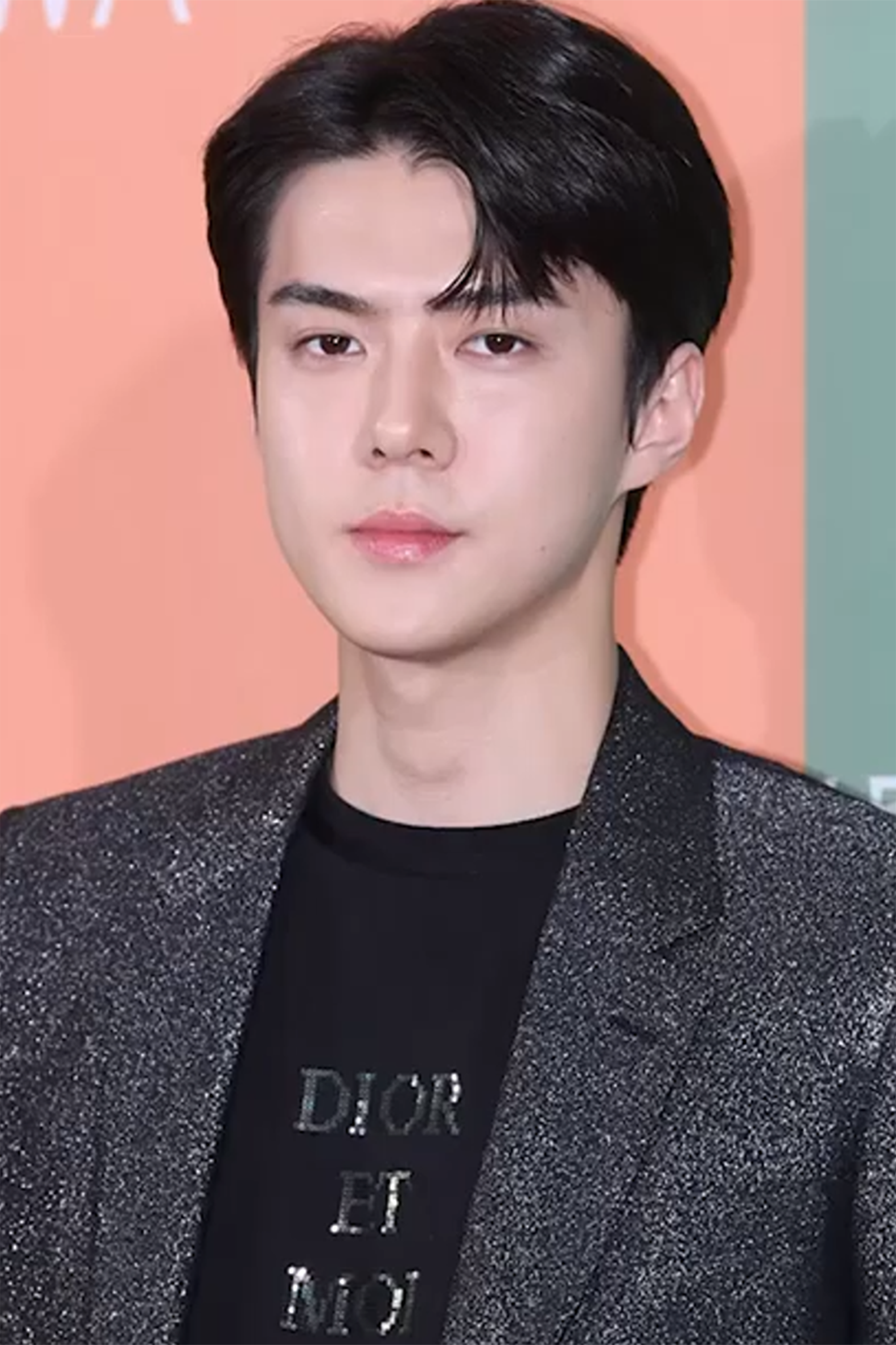
Member Sehun is credited as the co-lyricist and the co-composer of the song

The song is about someone hiding their phone obsession and the feelings that come with it.

It was produced and arranged by Studio 159 in the key of F minor with the tempo of 90 beats per minute.

During their V Live broadcast on July 13, Chanyeol revealed that he was "excited" and danced on the spot after hearing the song for the first time.

== Music video ==
The music video was released on July 7, 2020. It mixes 70s, 90s, and 2000s styles for a retro feel, showing Chanyeol and Sehun's funny struggle with waiting for a text message on a Blackberry phone.

== Live performance ==
The song is included in Chanyeol's "2024 Chanyeol Live Tour: City-scape".

== Chart ==
Chart performance for "Telephone"
Chart (2020)	Peak position
South Korea (Gaon)	72
US World Digital Song Sales (Billboard)	23

== Credits and personnel ==
Credits adapted from the album's liner notes.

Studio

- SM Big Shot – recording, digital editing, engineered for mix
- PYT Studio – recording
- SM Blue Ocean Studio – mixing
- 821 Sound Mastering – mastering

Personnel

- SM Entertainment – executive producer
- Lee Soo-man – producer
- Studio 159 – producer, composition, lyrics, arrangement
  - Loey – vocals, composition, lyrics, arrangement, background vocals, vocal direction
  - MQ – composition, lyrics, arrangement
  - Jeon Yong-joon – composition, lyrics, arrangement, piano
  - Yunji – composition, lyrics, arrangement, drum, strings, keyboards, bass
- Gaeko – composition, lyrics, vocal direction, programming, synthesizer
- Oh Se-hun – vocals, composition, lyrics
- 10cm – vocals, background vocals
- Chancellor – recording, background vocals
- Lee Min-gyu – recording, digital editing, engineered for mix, mixing
- Lee Yo-han – recording
- Kim Chul-soon – mixing
- Kwon Nam-woo – mastering

== Release history ==
Release history for "Telephone"
Region	Date	Format	Label
South Korea	July 7, 2020	Digital download; streaming	SM; Dreamus
Various	July 7, 2020	Digital download; streaming	SM
