= Exo Planet 5 – Exploration =

2019 concert tour by Exo

Exo Planet #5 – Exploration
- Asia tour by Exo
- Associated album: Don't Mess Up My Tempo; Love Shot; Obsession
- Start date: July 19, 2019
- End date: December 31, 2019
- No. of shows: 31

Exo concert chronology
- Exo Planet #4 – The Elyxion (2017–18); Exo Planet #5 – Exploration (2019); Exo Planet #6 – Exhorizon (2026)

Exo Planet #5 – Exploration (stylized as EXO PLANET #5 – EXplOration) is the fifth concert tour headlined by South Korean-Chinese boy band Exo. The tour was officially announced on May 30, 2019, and began on July 19, 2019, in South Korea. The tour concluded on December 31, 2019, comprising 31 shows in 9 countries.

== Concerts ==
=== Seoul ===
- The announcement of the tour was made officially by SM Entertainment in May 2019, starting with six days in Olympic Gymnastics Arena on July 19–21 and 26–28, 2019.

=== Hong Kong ===
- The first concert outside of Korea was on August 10, 2019, at Asia World Expo Arena in Hong Kong.
- The second concert is on August 11, 2019, at Asia World Expo Arena in Hong Kong.

=== Manila ===
- The first day of the concert on August 23, was added after the second day of the concert.

== Set list ==
Seoul, South Korea

Opening VCR

- Intro.
- Transformer
- Tempo
- Gravity
- Sign

Baekhyun VCR

- UN Village (Baekhyun solo)

VCR

- 24/7
- Love Shot
- Ooh La La La

Ment

- Monster
- Oasis
- Been Through (Suho solo)
- Lights Out (Chen solo)

VCR

- What a Life (Exo-SC)
- Closer to You (Exo-SC)
- Falling for You
- Wait

Ment

- Power
- Confession (Kai solo)

VCR

- Bad Dream
- Damage + (Sehun solo)
- Growl (Shortened)
- Overdose (Shortened)
- Call Me Baby

VCR Encore

- Unfair
- On the Snow

Ending Ment

- Smile On My Face
Ending VCR
Hong Kong

Opening VCR

- Intro.
- Tempo
- Transformer
- Gravity

Baekhyun VCR

- UN Village (Baekhyun solo)

VCR

- 24/7
- Love Shot
- Ooh La La La

Ment

- Monster
- Oasis
- Been Through (Suho solo)
- Lights Out (Chen solo)

VCR

- What a Life (Exo-SC)
- Closer to You (Exo-SC)
- Falling For You
- Wait

Ment

- Power
- Confession (Kai solo)

VCR

- Bad Dream
- Damage + (Sehun solo)
- Growl (Shortened)
- Overdose (Shortened)
- Call Me Baby

VCR Encore

- Unfair
- On The Snow

Ending Ment

- Smile On My Face
Ending VCR
Manila, Philippines

Opening VCR

- Intro.
- Tempo
- Transformer
- Gravity

Baekhyun VCR

- UN Village (Baekhyun solo)

VCR

- 24/7
- Love Shot
- Ooh La La La

Ment

- Monster
- Oasis
- Been Through (Suho solo)
- Lights Out (Chen solo)

VCR

- What a Life (Exo-SC)
- Closer to You (Exo-SC)
- Falling For You
- Wait

Ment

- Power
- Confession (Kai solo)

VCR

- Bad Dream
- Damage + (Sehun solo)
- Growl (Shortened)
- Overdose (Shortened)
- Call Me Baby

VCR Encore

- Unfair
- On The Snow

Ending Ment

- Smile On My Face
Ending VCR
Singapore

Opening VCR

- Intro.
- Tempo
- Transformer
- Gravity

Baekhyun VCR

- UN Village (Baekhyun solo)

VCR

- 24/7
- Love Shot
- Ooh La La La

Ment

- Monster
- Oasis
- Been Through (Suho solo)
- Lights Out (Chen solo)

VCR

- What a Life (Exo-SC)
- Closer to You (Exo-SC)
- Falling For You
- Wait

Ment

- Power
- Confession (Kai solo)

VCR

- Bad Dream
- Damage + (Sehun solo)
- Growl (Shortened)
- Overdose (Shortened)
- Call Me Baby

VCR Encore

- Unfair
- On The Snow

Ending Ment

- Smile On My Face
Ending VCR
Bangkok, Thailand

Opening VCR

- Intro.
- Tempo
- Transformer
- Gravity

Baekhyun VCR

- UN Village (Baekhyun solo)

VCR

- 24/7
- Love Shot
- Ooh La La La

Ment

- Monster
- Oasis
- Been Through (Suho solo)
- Lights Out (Chen solo)

VCR

- What a Life (Exo-SC)
- Closer to You (Exo-SC)
- Falling For You
- Wait

Ment

- Power
- Confession (Kai solo)

VCR

- Bad Dream
- Damage + (Sehun solo)
- Growl (Shortened)
- Overdose (Shortened)
- Call Me Baby

VCR Encore

- Unfair
- On The Snow

Ending Ment

- Smile On My Face
Ending VCR
Taipei, Taiwan

Opening VCR

- Intro.
- Tempo (CH)
- Transformer
- Gravity

Baekhyun VCR

- UN Village (Baekhyun solo)

VCR

- 24/7
- Love Shot (CH)
- Ooh La La La

Ment

- Monster
- Oasis
- Been Through (Suho solo)
- Lights Out (Chen solo)

VCR

- What a Life (Exo-SC)
- Closer to You (Exo-SC)
- Falling For You
- Wait

Ment

- Power (CH)
- Confession (Kai solo)

VCR

- Bad Dream
- Damage + (Sehun solo)
- Growl (Shortened)
- Overdose (Shortened)
- Call Me Baby

VCR Encore

- Unfair
- On The Snow

Ending Ment

- Smile On My Face
Ending VCR
Jakarta, Indonesia

VCR mở đầu

- Intro
- Tempo (KR)
- Transformer (KR)
- Gravity

BAEKHYUN VCR

- UN Village (Baekhyun solo)

VCR

- 24/7
- Love Shot (KR)
- Ooh La La

MENT

- Monster (KR)
- Oasis
- Been Through (Suho solo)
- Lights Out (Chen solo)

VCR

- What A Life (EXO-SC sub unit)
- Close To You (EXO-SC sub unit)
- Falling For You (KR)
- Wait

MENT

- Power (KR)
- Confession (Kai solo)

VCR

- Bad Dream
- Damage ̟ Sehun solo
- Growl (KR)
- Overdose (KR)
- Call Me Baby (KR)

VCR Encore

- Unfair (KR)
- On The Snow (KR)

ENDING MENT

- Smile On My Face
ENDING VCR
Kuala Lumpur, Malaysia

VCR mở đầu

- Intro
- Tempo (KR)
- Transformer (KR)
- Gravity

BAEKHYUN VCR

- UN Village (Baekhyun solo)

VCR

- 24/7
- Love Shot (KR)
- Ooh La La

MENT

- Monster (KR)
- Oasis
- Been Through (Suho solo)
- Lights Out (Chen solo)

VCR

- What A Life (EXO-SC sub unit)
- Close To You (EXO-SC sub unit)
- Falling For You (KR)
- Wait

MENT

- Power (KR)
- Confession (Kai solo)

VCR

- Bad Dream
- Damage ̟ Sehun solo
- Growl (KR)
- Overdose (KR)
- Call Me Baby (KR)

VCR Encore

- Unfair (KR)
- On The Snow (KR)

ENDING MENT

- Smile On My Face
ENDING VCR
Japan

VCR mở đầu

- Intro
- Tempo (KR)
- Transformer (KR)
- Gravity

BAEKHYUN VCR

- UN Village (Baekhyun solo)

VCR

- 24/7
- Love Shot (KR)
- Ooh La La

MENT

- Monster (KR)
- Oasis
- Been Through (Suho solo)
- Lights Out (Chen solo)

VCR

- What A Life (EXO-SC sub unit)
- Close To You (EXO-SC sub unit)
- Falling For You (KR)
- Wait

MENT

- Power (KR)
- Confession (Kai solo)

VCR

- Bad Dream
- Damage ̟ Sehun solo
- Growl (KR)
- Overdose (KR)
- Call Me Baby (KR)

VCR Encore

- Unfair (KR)
- On The Snow (KR)

ENDING MENT

- Bird
- Smile On My Face
ENDING VCR
Seoul, South Korea (Encore)

Opening VCR

- Intro.
- Obsession
- Jekyll
- Monster

Baekhyun VCR

- UN Village (Baekhyun solo)

VCR

- 24/7
- Love Shot
- Ooh La La La

Ment

- Tempo
- Oasis
- Been Through (Suho solo)
- Miracles in December (Chen solo)

VCR

- What a Life (EXO-SC sub unit)
- Just Us 2 (EXO-SC sub unit, Suho)
- Non Stop
- Butterfly Effect
- Day After Day

Ment

- Power
- Confession (Kai solo)
- Spoiler (Kai solo)

VCR

- Bad Dream
- Damage + (Sehun solo)
- Growl (Shortened)
- Overdose (Shortened)
- Call Me Baby

VCR Encore

- The First Snow
- On The Snow

Ending Ment

- Angel
Ending VCR

== Tour dates ==
Date	City	Country	Venue	Attendance
July 19, 2019	Seoul	South Korea	KSPO Dome	84,000
July 20, 2019	Seoul	South Korea	KSPO Dome	84,000
July 21, 2019	Seoul	South Korea	KSPO Dome	84,000
July 26, 2019	Seoul	South Korea	KSPO Dome	84,000
July 27, 2019	Seoul	South Korea	KSPO Dome	84,000
July 28, 2019	Seoul	South Korea	KSPO Dome	84,000
August 10, 2019	Hong Kong	China	AsiaWorld–Arena	20,000
August 11, 2019	Hong Kong	China	AsiaWorld–Arena	20,000
August 23, 2019	Pasay	Philippines	Mall of Asia Arena	20,000
August 24, 2019	Pasay	Philippines	Mall of Asia Arena	20,000
September 15, 2019	Singapore		Singapore Indoor Stadium	8,000
September 20, 2019	Bangkok	Thailand	Impact Arena	33,000
September 21, 2019	Bangkok	Thailand	Impact Arena	33,000
September 22, 2019	Bangkok	Thailand	Impact Arena	33,000
September 28, 2019	Taipei	Taiwan	Taipei Arena	22,000
September 29, 2019	Taipei	Taiwan	Taipei Arena	22,000
October 11, 2019	Fukuoka	Japan	Marine Messe Fukuoka	—N/a
October 12, 2019	Fukuoka	Japan	Marine Messe Fukuoka	—N/a
October 13, 2019	Fukuoka	Japan	Marine Messe Fukuoka	—N/a
October 18, 2019	Osaka	Japan	Osaka-jō Hall	—N/a
October 19, 2019	Osaka	Japan	Osaka-jō Hall	—N/a
October 22, 2019	Yokohama	Japan	Yokohama Arena	—N/a
October 23, 2019	Yokohama	Japan	Yokohama Arena	—N/a
November 23, 2019	Jakarta	Indonesia	Indonesia Convention Exhibition	—N/a
December 14, 2019	Kuala Lumpur	Malaysia	Axiata Arena	—N/a
December 20, 2019	Miyagi	Japan	Sekisui Heim Super Arena	—N/a
December 21, 2019	Miyagi	Japan	Sekisui Heim Super Arena	—N/a
December 22, 2019	Miyagi	Japan	Sekisui Heim Super Arena	—N/a
December 29, 2019	Seoul	South Korea	KSPO Dome	—N/a
December 30, 2019	Seoul	South Korea	KSPO Dome	—N/a
December 31, 2019	Seoul	South Korea	KSPO Dome	—N/a

== Television broadcasts ==
Television premiere date, country of broadcast, title of program, date filmed, and location filmed
Premiere date	Country	Channel	Program title	Recording date	Recording location	Ref.
December 30, 2019	Japan	Wowow	Exo Planet #5 – Exploration – in Japan	October 22–23, 2019	Various in Japan	
