= 1 Billion Views =

- Digital cover

Studio album by Exo-SC
- Released: July 13, 2020
- Recorded: 2020
- Studios: 2sixT (Seoul); Communication Security Lab (Seoul); GAEjaksil (Seoul); P.O.P (Seoul); PYT (Seoul); SM Big Shot (Seoul); SM LVYIN (Seoul); SM Yellow Tail (Seoul)
- Genres: Hip hop; R&B
- Length: 30:52
- Language: Korean
- Labels: SM; Dreamus
- Producers: Lee Soo-man; Gaeko

Exo-SC chronology
What a Life (2019)	1 Billion Views (2020)

Singles from 1 Billion Views
- 1. "Telephone" Released: July 7, 2020; 2. "1 Billion Views" Released: July 13, 2020

1 Billion Views is the debut studio album by South Korean hip hop duo Exo-SC, the second official sub-unit of South Korean–Chinese boy group Exo. It was released on July 13, 2020, by SM Entertainment, and features nine tracks. The album debuted at number one on the Gaon Album Chart, and was the duo's first top-ten entry on the Oricon Albums Chart, peaking at number ten in its first week.

To promote the album, "Telephone" was released as a pre-release single on July 7, 2020, while the eponymous title track served as the second single on July 13, 2020. The latter earned the duo their first top-thirty entry on the Gaon Digital Chart since their debut.

== Background and release ==
On June 9, SM confirmed that EXO-SC were preparing to release a new album in July. On June 23, the album's release date and title were announced along with a teaser image of the digital cover.

On July 1, a teaser image of the album's track list and schedule was released. On July 2, five teaser images of Chanyeol were released, with another five images of Sehun released the next day. On July 3, it was reported that the duo participated in writing the lyrics of every song on the album and helped compose the tracks "Telephone", "Fly Away" and "On Me". On July 4, five teaser images of both Sehun and Chanyeol were released. On July 6, teaser images of the duo both together and individually were released. On the same day, it was reported that the album features two solo tracks: "Nothin'", sung by Chanyeol and "On Me", sung by Sehun. On July 7, two teaser images of the duo were released. On the same day, "Telephone" featuring 10cm was released digitally along with a music video. On July 8, teaser images of both members were released, along with the music video for "Nothin'", a solo track by Chanyeol. On July 9, the music video for Sehun's solo track "On Me" was released. On July 12, "1 Billion Views" music video teaser was released. On July 13, the album was officially released along with "1 Billion Views" music video.

== Composition and production ==
The album opens with the titular "1 Billion Views", a trendy hip hop song with a funky guitar sound and addictive disco rhythm. Featuring fellow singer Moon, the song finds the duo "wanting to see one's loved one" by playing their video repeatedly. The second track "Say It", featuring Penomeco (who also co-wrote the lyrics), is described as a hip hop song that combines a heavy 808 base and bossa nova rhythm in order to "feel the summer vibe".

"Telephone", featuring 10cm, is described as hip hop song with a cheerful piano riff and a heavy bass beat.

"Fly away", featuring Gaeko who also participated in composing the song, is described as an R&B hip-hop song based on sentimental lyrical band sounds.

"Nothin'", Chanyeol's solo song, in which he participated in both writing and composing, is described as a hip hop R&B song with a harmony between the dreamy vibe electric guitar sounds and the heavy beats. The lyrics are about one's determination to go on their own way silently and without paying attention to the surroundings.

"On Me", Sehun's solo, in which he participated in both writing and composing, is described as a trap hip hop song with a rhythmical bass & strong synthesizer. The lyrics contain a message of "I'll do my best in every present moment".

"Rodeo Station" is a hip hop song which combines simple guitar riffs and casual beats. In the lyrics, Sehun and Chanyeol look back on their past and present lives and recall the scenery around Apgujeong Rodeo station during their trainee days.

"Jet Lag" is a charming R&B hip hop song with a lyrical guitar performance with lyrics about the main character who's in a relationship where they can't meet their loved one easily, and both parts feel like their love is growing apart because of the time they spend away from each other.

== Track listing ==
1 Billion Views track listing
No.	Title	Lyrics	Music	Arrangement	Length
1.	"1 Billion Views" (Korean: 10억뷰; RR: 10eokbyu) (featuring Moon))	Gaeko; Boi B; Loey; Sehun	Gaeko; Gray (Grayground); DAX (Grayground); SOLE (Devine Channel)	Grayground	3:29
2.	"Say It" (featuring Penomeco)	Gaeko; Thama (Devine Channel); Loey; Sehun; Penomeco	Ninos Hanna; Adam Kulling; Yei Gonzalez; Santiago Rodriguez Liem	Yei Gonzalez; Adam Kulling	3:21
3.	"Rodeo Station" (Korean: 로데오역; RR: Rodeoyeok)	Gaeko; Boi B; Loey; Sehun	Gaeko; Padi; Kim Tae-san; Thama (Devine Channel)	Padi; Kim Tae-san	3:40
4.	"Telephone" (Korean: 척; RR: Cheok; lit. 'Chuck') (featuring 10cm))	Loey (Studio 519); MQ (Studio 519); Jeon Yong-joon (Studio 519); Yunji (Studio 519); Gaeko; Sehun	Loey (Studio 519); MQ (Studio 519); Jeon Yong-joon (Studio 519); Yunji (Studio 519); Gaeko; Sehun	Studio 519	3:16
5.	"Jet Lag" (Korean: 시차적응; RR: Sichajeogeung)	Gaeko; Hangzoo; Loey; Sehun	Gaeko; Thama (Devine Channel); Padi; Kim Tae-san	Padi; Kim Tae-san	3:17
6.	"Fly Away" (Korean: 날개; RR: Nalgae; lit. 'Wing') (featuring Gaeko))	Loey (Studio 519); MQ (Studio 519); Jeon Yong-joon (Studio 519); Yunji (Studio 519); Gaeko; Sehun	Loey (Studio 519); MQ (Studio 519); Jeon Yong-joon (Studio 519); Yunji (Studio 519); Gaeko; Sehun	Studio 519	3:46
7.	"Nothin'" (Chanyeol solo)	Loey; Gaeko	Nellz; Will Yanez; Mike Molina; John Mitchelle; Kyle Christopher; Loey; Alexander "Eskeerdo" Izquierdo	Nellz; Will Yanez; Mike Molina; Alexander "Eskeerdo" Izquierdo	3:26
8.	"On Me" (Sehun solo)	Loey (Studio 519); MQ (Studio 519); Jeon Yong-joon (Studio 519); Yunji (Studio 519); Gaeko; Sehun	Loey (Studio 519); MQ (Studio 519); Jeon Yong-joon (Studio 519); Yunji (Studio 519); Gaeko; Sehun	Imlay; Studio 519	2:55
9.	"1 Billion Views" (Instrumental)		Gray (Grayground); DAX (Grayground)	Grayground	3:29
Total length:					30:52

== Charts ==
Chart performance for 1 Billion Views
Chart (2020)	Peak position
Japanese Albums (Oricon)	10
Japanese Hot Albums (Billboard Japan)	16
Polish Albums (ZPAV)	22
South Korean Albums (Gaon)	1
UK Album Downloads (Official Charts)	65

== Accolades ==
=== Music program awards ===
Song	Program	Date	Ref.
"1 Billion Views"	Music Bank (KBS)	July 24, 2020	

== Sales ==
Overall sales
Region	Sales
Japan	5,824
South Korea	526,868

== Certifications ==
Certifications for 1 Billion Views
Region	Certification	Certified units/sales
South Korea (KMCA)	2× Platinum	500,000^{^}
^{^} Shipments figures based on certification alone.

== Release history ==
Release history for 1 Billion Views
Region	Date	Format	Label
South Korea	July 13, 2020	CD	SM; Dreamus
Various	July 13, 2020	Digital download; streaming	SM

== See also ==
- List of Gaon Album Chart number ones of 2020
