= Penomeco =

Penomeco 페노메코
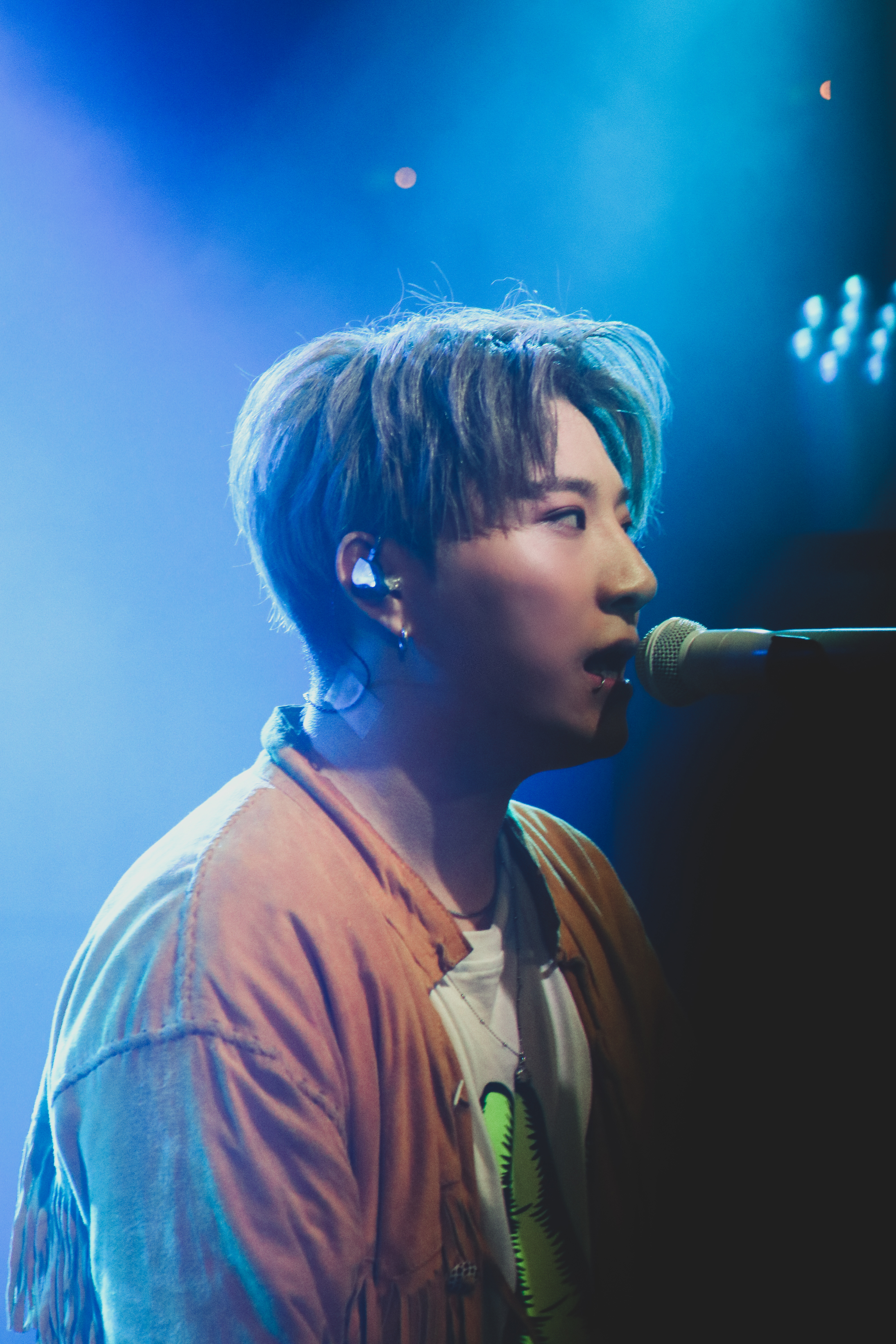
- Penomeco performing at his second solo concert 'Penomeco's Showroom' in Seoul on April 6, 2019

Background information
- Born: Jeong Dong-uk; October 7, 1992 (age 34); South Korea
- Genres: Hip hop; R&B; Afropop
- Occupations: Rapper; singer-songwriter
- Instrument: Vocals
- Years active: 2014–present
- Labels: Million Market; P Nation; EGO Group
- Website: egogroup.co.kr/36

Korean name
- Hangul: 정동욱
- RR: Jeong Donguk
- MR: Chŏng Tonguk

Jeong Dong-uk (Korean: 정동욱; born October 7, 1992), better known by his stage name, Penomeco (Korean: 페노메코), is a South Korean rapper and singer-songwriter. He released his debut single Right There on October 16, 2014. He also released his first extended play, Garden, on December 20, 2018. In June that same year, he was crowned the final winner of the Mnet music battle show Breakers. He is a member of the hip-hop crew Fanxy Child with Zico, Crush, Dean, Millic and Stay Tuned.

On June 28, 2020, Penomeco announced that he has parted ways with Million Market, following the end of his 4-year contract. On April 20, 2021, it was revealed that he had signed an exclusive contract with P Nation and subsequently released his second extended play, Dry Flower, on the same day.

On April 19, 2023, Penomeco released his third extended play, Rorschach Part 1. The songs in the second part of the series, Rorschach Part 2, were released on June 19, 2023.

On January 10, 2024, P Nation announced that their exclusive contract with Penomeco had come to an end.

On July 22, 2024, it was reported that Penomeco had signed an exclusive contract with EGO Group and would eventually launch his brand label, if i, under the music label. Subsequently on August 22, 2024, he released his fourth extended play, Organic2.

== Discography ==
=== Extended plays ===
Title	EP details	Peak chart positions	Sales
Title	EP details	KOR	Sales
Garden	Released: December 20, 2018; Label: Million Market, Dreamus; Formats: CD, digital download, streaming; Track listing: 1. "Cool" (featuring Tobi Lou); 2. "O.M.I" (featuring The Quiett); 3. "No.5" (featuring Crush); 4. "O.F.F" (featuring Gaeko and Elo); 5. "Okay"; 6. "Till I Die"; 7. "Cool" (solo version; CD only)	35	KOR: 1,000
Dry Flower	Released: April 20, 2021; Label: P Nation, Dreamus; Formats: CD, digital download, streaming; Track listing: 1. "Rain Drop"; 2. "You Up"; 3. "Jaja"; 4. "Actually Pt. 2" (걘 아니야 Pt. 2); 5. "Interlude"; 6. "Remember Me" (했을 걸) (featuring Hoody); 7. "Better" (featuring Kid Milli); 8. "Change" (featuring Sogumm); 9. "Hotel Lobby" (featuring Verbal Jint); 10. "Insomnia" (불면증)	14	KOR: 7,233
Rorschach	Part 1; Released: April 19, 2023; Label: P Nation, Dreamus; Formats: Digital download, streaming; Track listing: 1. "BoyPablo (2019)"; 2. "Rindaman" (featuring Zico); 3. "Pew!" (피융!) (featuring Zico); 4. "Margiela" (featuring Paul Blanco); 5. "Bubble"; 6. "Around" (featuring Yonko); 7. "Trust Me"	38	KOR: 2,657
Rorschach	Part 2; Released: June 19, 2023; Label: P Nation, Dreamus; Formats: CD, digital download, streaming; Track listing: 1. "Ghost" (featuring Gaeko and Viceversa); 2. "X"; 3. "Yak Yak"; 4. "Quick Fast"; 5. "Bangers" (featuring Loopy); 6. "23 Pt.2"	38	KOR: 2,657
Organic2	Released: August 22, 2024; Label: EGO Group; Formats: CD, digital download, streaming; Track listing: 1. "Organic"; 2. "Asurabalbalta" (아수라발발타); 3. "Soda"; 4. "Garangbi" (가랑비); 5. "Aurora" (featuring Crush); 6. "ICN"	67	KOR: 1,082
RNSSNC TAPE	Released: July 23, 2025; Label: EGO Group; Formats: CD, digital download, streaming; Track listing: 1. "RNSSNC"; 2. "EGGE" (featuring YDG); 3. "Dance With Me"; 4. "Leave Without You" (featuring Moon Sujin); 5. "MyChick" (featuring Lil Cherry); 6. "Fine By Me"; 7. "KK" (ㅋㅋ); 8. "Coco Bottle Apro Remix"	68	KOR: 1,376

=== Collaboration albums ===
Title	Album details
Odd (project album with Elo)	Released: November 7, 2019; Label: Million Market, AOMG; Formats: Digital download; Track listing: 1. "Love?" (featuring Gray); 2. "Body"; 3. "Deep"; 4. "View"

=== Single albums ===
Title	Single album details
Film	Released: March 1, 2017; Label: Million Market, Loen Entertainment; Formats: CD, digital download, streaming; Track listing: 1. "SMT (So Many Times)"; 2. "WTF (Went Too Far)"; 3. "PNM (Plus And Minus)"
if.	Released: September 9, 2019; Label: Million Market, Dreamus; Formats: Digital download, streaming; Track listing: 1. "Do Ma Thang"; 2. "Señorita (featuring Nafla)"
Organic	Released: August 25, 2021; Label: P Nation, Dreamus; Formats: Digital download, streaming; Track listing: 1. "Shy (eh o)" 2. "Bolo (featuring YDG)"

=== Singles ===
==== As lead artist ====
Title	Year	Peak chart positions	Album
Title	Year	KOR Down.	Album
"Right There"	2014	—	Non-album singles
"23"	2014	—	Non-album singles
"Ma Fam"	2016	—	Non-album singles
"For You" (feat. Punchnello, Crush)	2016	—	Non-album singles
"No Love"	2017	—	Non-album singles
"WTF (Went Too Far)"	2017	—	Film (single album)
"Hunnit"	2017	—	Hunnit – SM Station
"L.I.E"	2018	59	Non-album singles
"Good Morning" (feat. Car, the Garden)	2018	—	Non-album singles
"O.F.F" (feat. Gaeko)	2018	—	Breakers Part 2
"Coco Bottle"	2018	99	Non-album single
"No.5" (feat. Crush)	2018	—	Garden
"Movie" (영화 한 편 찍자)	2019	—	Non-album singles
"Tempo" (feat. Sik-K)	2019	—	Non-album singles
"Señorita" (feat. Nafla)	2019	—	if. (digital single album)
"Always You Are by My Side" (언제나 그대 내 곁에)	2021	—	The Late Kim Hyun-sik's 30th Anniversary Memorial Album "Making Memories" Pt.6
"Jaja"	2021	—	Dry Flower
"Shy (eh o)"	2021	—	Organic (digital single album)
"Bolo" (feat. YDG)	2021	—	Organic (digital single album)
"Cloudy" (먹구름)	2022	—	Non-album single
"Rindaman" (feat. Zico)	2023	—	Rorschach, Part 1
"Pew!" (피융!) (feat. Zico)	2023	—	Rorschach, Part 1
"X"	2023	—	Rorschach, Part 2
"Asurabalbalta" (아수라발발타)	2024	—	Organic2
"Soda"	2024	—	Organic2
"Aurora" (feat. Crush)	2024	—	Organic2
"Wish" (바람)	2024	—	Non-album single
"KK" (ㅋㅋ)	2025	—	RNSSNC TAPE
"My Chick" (feat. Lil Cherry)	2025	—	RNSSNC TAPE
"EGGE" (feat. YDG)	2025	—	RNSSNC TAPE
"—" denotes releases that did not chart.

==== As a featured artist ====
Title	Year	Peak chart positions	Album
Title	Year	KOR	Album
"Say I'm Right" (내가 옳다 말해) (Jinsol feat. Nucksal, Penomeco)	2014	—	Non-album single
"Say Yes or No" (말해 Yes Or No) (Zico feat. Penomeco, The Quiett)	2015	—	Gallery
"U.F.O" (MC Mong feat. Suran, ₩uNo, Penomeco)	2016	—	U.F.O
"DUI" (7ane feat. Penomeco)	2017	—	DUI
"Oh I" (Elo feat. Penomeco)	2018	—	Gradation Vol.1
"Play Me" (Woogie feat. Sik-K, Penomeco)	2018	—	Non-album single
"Cupid" (pH-1 feat. Penomeco)	2018	—	loves
"No More" (Keebomb feat. Penomeco)	2019	—	Relax
"Baby" (Dress feat. Penomeco, Sogumm)	2019	—	Non-album single
"Blue Hawaii" (Punchnello feat. Crush, Penomeco)	2019	—	ordinary.
"Feeling" (Jeong Se-woon feat. Penomeco)	2019	—	Plus Minus Zero
"Dear" (Mia feat. Penomeco)	2019	—	Non-album single
"Popcorn" (팝콘) (Aquinas feat. Penomeco, Youra)	2019	—	High School Rapper 3 Final
"Too Much" (Bigone feat. Penomeco)	2019	—	Peach Blossom
"Jungle" (정글) (Punchnello feat. Penomeco, Sam Kim)	2019	—	Show Me the Money 8 Final
"High" (ㅎㅇ) (Lee Bada feat. Penomeco)	2019	—	Non-album single
"I Think" (Apro, Leellamarz feat. Penomeco)	2019	—	[ Leellamarz ] Is Different.
"MSG" (맵고짜고단거) (Dynamic Duo feat. Penomeco)	2019	80	Off Duty
"Take It Away" (Avin feat. Penomeco, pH-1)	2019	—	Tranche
"Cold" (봄 같던 그녀가 춥대) (MC Mong, Kim Jae-hwan feat. Penomeco)	2020	35	X by X [ Deficiency ]
"What about" (아까워) (Sam Kim feat. Penomeco)	2020	—	Non-album single
"Up & Down" (Coogie feat. Mirani, Penomeco)	2021	—	I Got a Feeling
"Hollywood Action" (Rhythm Power feat. Penomeco)	2021	—	Non-album singles
"ING" (고군분투) (Apro feat. Gaeko, Penomeco)	2021	—	Non-album singles
"Only U" (Moon Sujin, Jiselle feat. Penomeco)	2022	—	Non-album singles
"Body 2 Body" (Babylon feat. Penomeco)	2023	—	Mood
"Passion" (Injae feat. Penomeco)	2024	—	Too Passionate
"Dugun Dugun Pt. 2" (두근 두근 Pt. 2) (Goldbuuda feat. Penomeco)	2025	—	Non-album single
"Moosa" (무사) (HUS feat. Penomeco)	2025	—	Moosa
"Dumb" (D.O. feat. Penomeco)	2025	—	Non-album singles
"Yin and Yang" (Zico and Crush feat. Dean and Penomeco)	2026	133	Non-album singles
"—" denotes releases that did not chart.

==== Collaborations ====
Title	Year	Peak chart positions	Sales	Album
Title	Year	KOR	Sales	Album
"Hold Up" (Samuel Seo, Rawyall, Omeae, Penomeco)	2014	—		Non-album single
"S.M.T.M" (Sleepy, Hash Swan, Olltii, Black Nine, Punchnello, Penomeco, Ignito & Dok2)	2017	82	KOR: 45,420	Show Me the Money 6 OST
"Paradise" (Millic feat. Fanxy Child)	2017	—		Vida
"Fresh Up" (San E, Microdot, Penomeco, Kebee)	2017	—		Non-album singles
"119 Remix" (Various Artists)	2018	— (Note: "119 Remix" did not enter the Circle Digital Chart, but it peaked at number 47 on the component Download Chart.)	—N/a*	Non-album singles
"Y" (as Fanxy Child)	2019	—	—N/a*	Non-album singles
"Love?" (with Elo feat. Gray)	2019	—	—N/a*	Odd
"Operator" (Nafla, Yunhway, Penomeco)	2020	—	—N/a*	Non-album singles
"Good Kid" (Lil Boi, Penomeco)	2021	— (Note: "Good Kid" did not enter the Circle Digital Chart, but it peaked at number 77 on the component Download Chart.)	—N/a*	Non-album singles
"White Gold Diamond Ring" (F.Hero, Patrickananda, Youngohm, Fiixd, Penomeco)	2022	—	—N/a*	Non-album singles
"Hiphop Anthem 2023" (Various Artists)	2023	—	—N/a*	Non-album singles
"When I Siege"	2025	—	—N/a*	Non-album singles
"When I Siege (Japanese Version)"	2025	—	—N/a*	Non-album singles
"Kawasaki" (Penomeco, Ronaldinho Gaúcho, Tu Música)	2026	—	—N/a*	Camisa 10
"—" denotes releases that did not chart. *Gaon stopped releasing download sales numbers in January 2018.

=== Guest appearances ===
List of non-single guest appearances, with other performing artists, showing year released and album name
Title	Year	Album	Ref.
"Campus Life" (Samuel Seo feat. Penomeco)	2014	24	
"The Crow" (Jinsol feat. Penomeco, Dowby, Samuel Seo)	2014	Non-album single	
"TKO" (Toy feat. Penomeco)	2014	Toy's'tory	
"Real Talk" (Babylon feat. Penomeco)	2016	Non-album singles	
"Thirsty & Empty" (feat. Penomeco)	2016	Non-album singles	
"Do It" (Jhnovr feat. Penomeco)	2016	Non-album singles	
"Fanxy Child" (Zico feat. Fanxy Child)	2017	Television	
"Hometown Girls" (Ted Park feat. Penomeco)	2018	Plugged In	
"Endorphin" (Crush feat. Penomeco, Punchnello)	2018	wonderlost	
"Positive Bounce" (Woodie Gochild feat. Penomeco)	2018	#Gochild	
"Honey Bee" (Dress & Sogumm feat. Penomeco)	2019	Not My Fault	
"Another Level" (Zico feat. Penomeco)	2019	Thinking	
"Say It" (Exo-SC feat. Penomeco)	2019	1 Billion Views	
"Hit It Off" (Park Ji-hoon feat. Penomeco)	2019	Message	
"Got It Bae" (Elo feat. Boi.B, Penomeco)	2022	Reality Check	
"Body On Me" (Gemini feat. Penomeco)	2023	Love Sick	
"Satisfied" (Crush feat. Penomeco)	2023	Wonderego	
"New Anthem" (Sik-K, Lil Moshpit feat. Penomeco)	2025	K-FLIP+	
"Maybe or Not" (Huh feat. Penomeco)	2025	Voice tool tip.txt 2	
"I Can’t Let You Go" (Bronze feat. Zin, Penomeco)	2025	Magic Station 1	

=== Music credits ===
Year	Artist	Album	Song	Lyrics		Music		Notes	Ref.
Year	Artist	Album	Song	Credited	With	Credited	With	Notes	Ref.
2014	Kruxx Beats	Non-album single	"Walk Up (feat. Omeae)"	Yes	Kruxx Beats	Yes	Kruxx Beats	Production	
2016	Zico	Break Up 2 Make Up	"I Am You, You Are Me" (너는 나 나는 너)	No	—N/a	No	—N/a	Chorus	
2016	Infinite Challenge	Non-album single	"Hit Da Hit"	No	—N/a	No	—N/a	Rap Direction	
2016	GOT7	Flight Log: Turbulence	"Boom x3"	Yes	Jackson Wang, Boytoy	No	—N/a	—N/a	
2016	Zico	Non-album single	"Bermuda Triangle"	No	—N/a	No	—N/a	Chorus	
2017	Zico	Television	"Genius (Behind the scene)" (천재 (Behind the scene))	No	—N/a	No	—N/a	Chorus	
2017	Zico	Television	"Artist"	No	—N/a	No	—N/a	Chorus	
2017	Zico	Television	"Bermuda Triangle"	No	—N/a	No	—N/a	Chorus	
2017	Block B	Montage	"My Zone"	Yes	Zico	No	—N/a	—N/a	
2018	Block B	Re:Montage	"My Zone"	Yes	Zico	No	—N/a	—N/a	
2018	Sleepy	Identity	"iD"	No	—N/a	Yes	Gray, Sleepy	—N/a	
2018	DinDin	Non-album singles	"Alone"	No	—N/a	Yes	DinDin, N-Soul	Production, Chorus	
2018	Chanyeol x Sehun	Non-album singles	"We Young"	Yes	—N/a	No	—N/a	—N/a	
2018	Exo	Don't Mess Up My Tempo	"Tempo"	Yes	JQ, Yoo Young-jin	No	—N/a	Korean version	
2018	Red Velvet	RBB	"Taste"	Yes	Park Seong-hee	No	—N/a	—N/a	
2018	Exo	LOVE SHOT - The 5th Album Repackage	"Tempo"	Yes	JQ, Yoo Young-jin	No	—N/a	Korean version	
2019	Itzy	IT'z ICY	"ICY"	Yes	J. Y. Park	No	—N/a	Rap Direction	
2020	Itzy	IT'z ME	"TING TING TING"	Yes	Lee Seu-ran, Kang Eun-jung	No	—N/a	—N/a	
2020	Itzy	IT'z ME	"24HRS"	Yes	—N/a	No	—N/a	—N/a	
2020	Jessi	Nuna	"NUNU NANA" (눈누난나)	Yes	Jessi, Psy, Illson, Damian, JohnJohn, Jaero	Yes	Yoo Gun-hyung, Jun Byung-il	—N/a	
2020	Dawn	Dawndididawn	"Dawndididawn (feat. Jessi)"	No	—N/a	Yes	Psy, Yoo Gun-hyung	—N/a	
2020	NCT U	NCT 2020 Resonance Pt. 1	"Make A Wish (Birthday Song)"	Yes	Damian	No	—N/a	Korean version	
2020	Park Ji-hoon	Message	"Hit It Off (prod. & feat. Penomeco)"	Yes	Damian	Yes	N-Soul, Nod	—N/a	
2020	Park Ji-hoon	Message	"Dress Code (feat. Punchnello)"	Yes	Damian, Punchnello	Yes	N-Soul	—N/a	
2020	NCT U	NCT 2020 Resonance Pt. 2	"Make A Wish (Birthday Song)"	Yes	Damian	No	—N/a	Korean version	
2020	NCT 2020	Non-album single	"Resonance"	Yes	Kenzie, Damian, Jakob Dorof	No	—N/a	—N/a	
2021	Itzy	Not Shy (English Ver.)	"ICY (English Ver.)"	Yes	J. Y. Park, Sophia Pae	No	—N/a	—N/a	
2021	IU	Lilac	"Empty Cup" (빈 컵)	No	—N/a	Yes	Woogie	—N/a	
2021	Astro	All Yours	"Someone Else"	Yes	Damian	No	—N/a	—N/a	
2021	Team P NATION	LOUD Live Round Pt. 1	"난 네 Brother (원곡 : 눈누난나 (NUNU NANA))"	Yes	Jessi, Psy, Illson, Damian, JohnJohn, Jaero	Yes	Yoo Gun-hyung, Jun Byung-il	—N/a	
2021	Park Ji-hoon	Hot&Cold	"Serious"	Yes	Damian	Yes	Apro	—N/a	
2021	Itzy	IT'z ITZY	"ICY -Japanese ver.-"	Yes	J. Y. Park, D&H	No	—N/a	—N/a	
2022	Verivery	Series 'O' Round 3: Whole	"Emotion"	Yes	Damian	No	—N/a	—N/a	
2022	TNX	Way Up	"180sec" (180초)	Yes	Damian	Yes	Yoo Gun-hyung	—N/a	
2022	TNX	Way Up	"Move" (비켜)	Yes	Damian	Yes	Yoo Gun-hyung	—N/a	
2022	TNX	Way Up	"Burst Up" (벌써)	Yes	Damian	Yes	Apro	—N/a	
2022	Crush	Non-album singles	"Rush Hour (feat. J-Hope of BTS)"	Yes	Crush, J-Hope	No	—N/a	—N/a	
2023	Pimrypie	Non-album singles	"Party (feat. Hyo)"	Yes	—N/a	Yes	Richard Craker	—N/a	
2023	Crush	Wonderego	"Hmm-cheat" (흠칫)	Yes	Crush	No	—N/a	—N/a	
2024	TNX	Non-album single	"Fuego"	Yes	Damian	Yes	Yoo Gun-hyung	—N/a	
2024	Hwasa	O	"NA"	Yes	Damian, Psy	No	—N/a	—N/a	
2024	Badvillain	Non-album single	"Zoom" (숨)	Yes	Damian	Yes	N-Soul	—N/a	
2025	D.O.	Bliss	"Fit"	Yes	Damian	No	—N/a	—N/a	
2026	BoyNextDoor	Home	"ddok ddok ddok" (똑똑똑)	Yes	Damian, Zico, Jaehyun, Taesan, Woonhak	No	—N/a	—N/a	
2026	MC Mong	Non-album single	"Days of Youth (feat. Chancellor)" (젊은날)	Yes	MC Mong, Chancellor, Seunghoo	No	—N/a	—N/a	
2026	D.O.	Dopamine	"Guitarist"	Yes	Damian, Haju	No	—N/a	—N/a	

== Filmography ==
=== Television ===
Year	Title	Role	Network(s)	Notes	Ref.
2017	Show Me the Money 6	Contestant	Mnet	Episodes 1–3, 8	
2018	Breakers	Contestant	Mnet	Winner	
2019	High School Rapper 3	Featuring artist	Mnet	Episode 8	
2019	Show Me the Money 8	Featuring artist	Mnet	Episode 10	
2020	King of Mask Singer	Contestant	MBC	Episodes 281–282	
2026	Show Me the Money 12	Featuring artist	Mnet	Episode 12	
