= What a Life (EP) =

- Digital cover

EP by Exo-SC
- Released: July 22, 2019
- Recorded: 2019
- Studios: Doobdoob (Seoul); SM Big Shot (Seoul); SM SSAM (Seoul)
- Genres: K-rap; hip hop
- Length: 20:08
- Language: Korean
- Labels: SM; Dreamus
- Producers: Lee Soo-man; Gaeko; Devine Channel

Exo-SC chronology
What a Life (2019)	1 Billion Views (2020)

Singles from What a Life
- 1. "What a Life" Released: July 22, 2019; 2. "Just Us 2" Released: July 22, 2019; 3. "Closer to You" Released: July 22, 2019

What a Life is the debut extended play by South Korean hip hop duo Exo-SC, the second official sub-unit of the South Korean–Chinese boy group Exo. It was released on July 22, 2019 by SM Entertainment. The EP features six tracks, including three singles.

== Background and release ==
On June 5, 2019, it was revealed that Chanyeol and Sehun would be debuting as Exo's second sub-unit and were preparing to release an album in July. On June 28, the EP's title and number of songs were revealed. On July 9, an instrumental teaser of one of the singles was released by W Korea following the duo's photo shoot for the magazine. On July 11, the album details were released on Exo's social media accounts. On July 12, it was revealed that the EP will feature three singles, and that it was produced by Dynamic Duo's Gaeko and Devine Channel. On July 15, it was revealed that the duo participated in writing and producing the album, and that the message of the EP is for youth. On July 17, three videos of the duo with Gaeko and Divine Channel were released where they talked about the making of the album. On the same day, a teaser of the music videos for the three singles was released. On July 20, a highlight medley video for the album was released, On the same day, the music video for "Just us 2" was released prior to the album's release. On July 22, the official music video for "What a Life" was released. On July 25, a video of Sehun and Chanyeol shooting What a Life was released. On July 26, the official music video for "Closer to You" was released. On July 29, a jacket making video of the duo was released.

== Composition and production ==
"What a Life" is described as a hip hop track with a "unique" plucking sound and lyrics containing a message of both working and playing happily.

"Just Us 2" is a hip hop song featuring piano instrumentation, soft synthesizers and a melodious chorus, with lyrics about vacationing in a hot summer spot. The track features rapper Gaeko and was composed by the South Korean artist Gray. The lyrics of the song were written by Boi B, Chanyeol and Sehun.

"Closer to You" is a hip hop R&B song with romantic sensibility. It features an emotional melody and a "highly addictive" chorus, with lyrics expressing the desire to be closer to a person. Chanyeol and Sehun participated in writing the lyrics with hip hop group Rhythm Power member Hangzoo.

== Promotion ==
Exo-SC performed "What a Life" and "Closer to You" for the first time on Exo's 5th concert Exo Planet 5 – Exploration on July 19, and will continue to do so for all the concerts in the tour.

Exo-SC held a press showcase event on July 22 at MUV Hall in Seogyo-dong, Mapo-gu, Seoul. On the same day, they held a showcase for the fans with Gaeko where they talked about the album, the process of making it and performed "What a Life", "Just Us 2" and "Closer to You".

On July 25, Exo-SC held a live stream show on the Chinese website Sina Weibo, where they recorded 2.11M concurrent viewers, becoming the first Korean artists to do so.

They received their first-ever music show win since debut on August 2, 2019 on KBS's Music Bank. On August 8, Exo-SC held a promotion event in Gwangjang-dong.

== Commercial performance ==
Sales of What a Life on QQ Music exceeded 1M yuan, and it received a Platinum record certification.

== Track listing ==
What a Life track listing
No.	Title	Lyrics	Music	Arrangement	Length
1.	"What a Life"	Gaeko; Loey; Sehun	Gaeko; Im Kwang-wook (Devine Channel); Andreas "Mage" Maggiani (Devine Channel)	Devine Channel	3:23
2.	"Just Us 2" (Korean: 있어 희미하게; RR: Iss-eo Huimihage; lit. 'Got faintly') (featuring Gaeko)	Gaeko; Boi B; Loey; Sehun	Gaeko; Gray (Grayground); DAX (Grayground)	Grayground	3:18
3.	"Closer to You" (Korean: 부르면 돼; RR: Buleumyeon Dwae; lit. 'Call it')	Gaeko; Hangzoo; Loey; Sehun	Gaeko; Im Kwang-wook (Devine Channel)	Devine Channel	3:07
4.	"Borderline" (Korean: 선; RR: seon)	Gaeko; Loey; Sehun	Gaeko; Mike Dupree (Devine Channel)	Devine Channel	2:39
5.	"Roller Coaster" (Korean: 롤러코스터; RR: Rolleokoseuteo)	Loey (Studio 519); MQ (Studio 519); Jeon Yong-joon (Studio 519); Yunji (Studio 519); Sehun; Gaeko	Loey (Studio 519); MQ (Studio 519); Jeon Yong-joon (Studio 519); Yunji (Studio 519); Sehun	Studio 519	3:10
6.	"Daydreamin'" (夢; mèng)	Loey (Studio 519); MQ (Studio 519); Jeon Yong-joon (Studio 519); Yunji (Studio 519); Sehun	Loey (Studio 519); MQ (Studio 519); Jeon Yong-joon (Studio 519); Yunji (Studio 519); Sehun	Studio 519	4:31
Total length:					20:08

== Charts ==
=== Weekly charts ===
Chart (2019)	Peak position
French Digital Albums (SNEP)	29
Japanese Albums (Oricon)	19
Japan Hot Albums (Billboard Japan)	26
Polish Albums (ZPAV)	43
South Korean Albums (Gaon)	1
UK Album Downloads (Official Charts)	78
US Independent Albums (Billboard)	32
US Top Heatseekers (Billboard)	10
US World Albums (Billboard)	8

=== Year-end charts ===
Chart (2019)	Position
South Korean Albums (Gaon)	12

== Accolades ==
Awards and nominations
Year	Organization	Award	Nominated work	Result	Ref
2020	Golden Disc Awards	Disc Bonsang	What a Life	Won	
2020	Golden Disc Awards	Disc Daesang	What a Life	Nominated	

=== Music program awards ===
Song	Program	Date	Ref.
"What a Life"	Music Bank	August 2, 2019	

== Sales ==
Region	Sales
South Korea	419,103
Japan	5,436
United States	1,000

== Release history ==
Release history for What a Life
Region	Date	Format	Label
South Korea	July 22, 2019	CD	SM; Dreamus
Various	July 22, 2019	Digital download; streaming	SM
