= Just Us 2 =

Single by Exo-SC featuring Gaeko

from the EP What a Life
- Language: Korean
- Released: July 22, 2019
- Recorded: 2019
- Studio: Doobdoob (Seoul); SM Big Shot (Seoul)
- Genre: Hip hop
- Length: 3:18
- Label: SM; Dreamus
- Composers: Gaeko; Gray; DAX
- Lyricists: Boi B; Loey; Sehun
- Producers: Gray; DAX

Exo-SC singles chronology
"What a Life" (2019)	"Just Us 2" (2019)	"Closer to You" (2019)

Music video
- "Just us 2" on YouTube

"Just Us 2" (Korean: 있어 희미하게; RR: iss-eo huimihage; lit. 'Faintly'; stylized Just us 2) is a song recorded by South Korean hip hop duo Exo-SC, the second official sub-unit of the South Korean-Chinese boy group Exo. It was released on July 22, 2019 by SM Entertainment as one of the three title tracks of their debut extended play What a Life.

== Background and release ==
"Just Us 2" is hip hop track featuring an addictive piano theme and, soft-feeling synthesizers and cool melodies, with lyrics that portrays the landscape of hot summer vacations spot. The track features rapper Gaeko and was composed by the South Korean artist Gray, he also took part in writing the lyrics of the song along with Boi B, Chanyeol and Sehun.

On July 31, a cam video of the two members separately of their performance of "Just Us 2" on their showcase were released.

== Music video ==
On July 18, a teaser of "Just Us 2" was released along with the other two title tracks of What a Life EP. On July 20, the official music video of "Just Us 2" was release prior to the album's release. The music video shows the duo and the producers of the song in the studio recording and composing the song.

== Live performance ==
On July 22, EXO-SC and Gaeko performed "Just Us 2" at their showcase.

Chanyeol included the song in his solo tour, "2025 Chanyeol Live Tour: City-scape - Epilogue".

== Credits and personnel ==
Credits adapted from the EP's liner notes.

Studio

- SM Big Shot Studio – recording
- Doobdoob Studio – recording, digital editing
- SM LVYIN Studio – engineered for mix
- SM Blue Ocean Studio – mixing
- 821 Sound – mastering

Personnel

- SM Entertainment – executive producer
- Lee Soo-man – producer
- Lee Sung-soo – production director
- Kim Young-min – executive supervisor
- Yoo Young-jin – music and sound supervisor
- Exo-SC – vocals
  - Loey – lyrics
  - Sehun – lyrics
- Gaeko – vocals, lyrics, composition, vocal directing, background vocals
- Boi B – lyrics
- Gray – producer, composition, arrangement, drums, piano, brass
- DAX – producer, composition, arrangement, drums, piano, brass
- Lee Min-kyu – recording
- Jang Woo-young – recording, digital editing
- Lee Ji-hong – engineered for mix
- Kim Cheol-sun – mixing
- Kwon Nam-woo – mastering

== Charts ==
Chart (2019)	Peak position
South Korea (Gaon)	107
South Korea (K-pop Hot 100)	3

== Release history ==
Region	Date	Format	Label
South Korea	July 22, 2019	Digital download; streaming	SM; Dreamus
Various	July 22, 2019	Digital download; streaming	SM
