= Sehun =

South Korean rapper (born 1994)

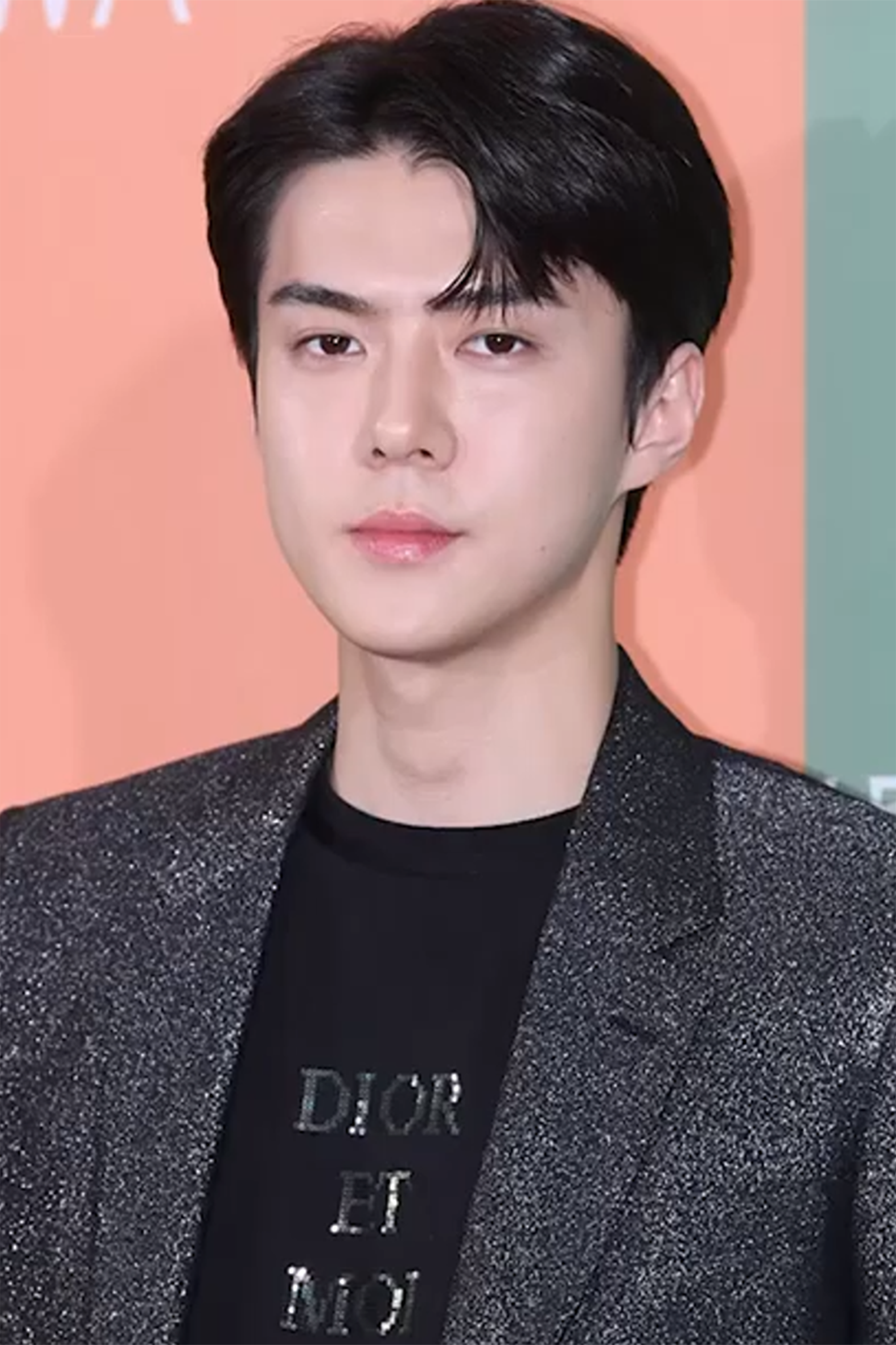
- Sehun in July 2019
- Born: Oh Se-hun; April 12, 1994 (age 32); Seoul, South Korea
- Occupations: Rapper; singer; songwriter; actor; dancer; model
- Years active: 2012–present
- Musical career
- Genres: K-pop; hip-hop
- Instrument: Vocals
- Label: SM
- Member of: Exo; Exo-K; Exo-SC; SM Town
- Website: Official website

Korean name
- Hangul: 오세훈
- Hanja: 吳世勳
- RR: O Sehun
- MR: O Sehun

Oh Se-hun (Korean: 오세훈; born April 12, 1994), known mononymously as Sehun, is a South Korean rapper, singer, songwriter, actor and dancer. He is a member of the South Korean-Chinese boy band Exo and its sub-unit Exo-SC. Apart from his group's activities, Sehun has also starred in various films and television dramas such as Dokgo Rewind (2018), Secret Queen Makers (2018), The Pirates: The Last Royal Treasure (2022), and All That We Loved (2023).

== Early life ==
Oh Se-hun was born in the Jungnang District of Seoul, South Korea on April 12, 1994. He graduated from the School of Performing Arts Seoul in February 2013. He has an older brother.

== Career ==
Sehun was first scouted by an SM Entertainment casting agent at 12 years old while he was out having lunch with friends, he was eventually cast into SM Entertainment in 2008. He went through four auditions in two years. On January 10, 2012, Sehun became the fifth Exo member to be officially introduced to the public. The group made their debut with the extended play Mama in April.

In February 2016, Sehun received a Weibo Star Award as voted by users of the Chinese social networking site Sina Weibo at the 5th Gaon Chart K-Pop Awards. In March, Sehun was cast as the male lead in the upcoming Korean-Chinese film Catman, which was supposed to be released in 2018. In July, Sehun was announced to be starring as the male lead in the upcoming Korean-Chinese web drama Dear Archimedes, which was supposed to began airing in 2019.

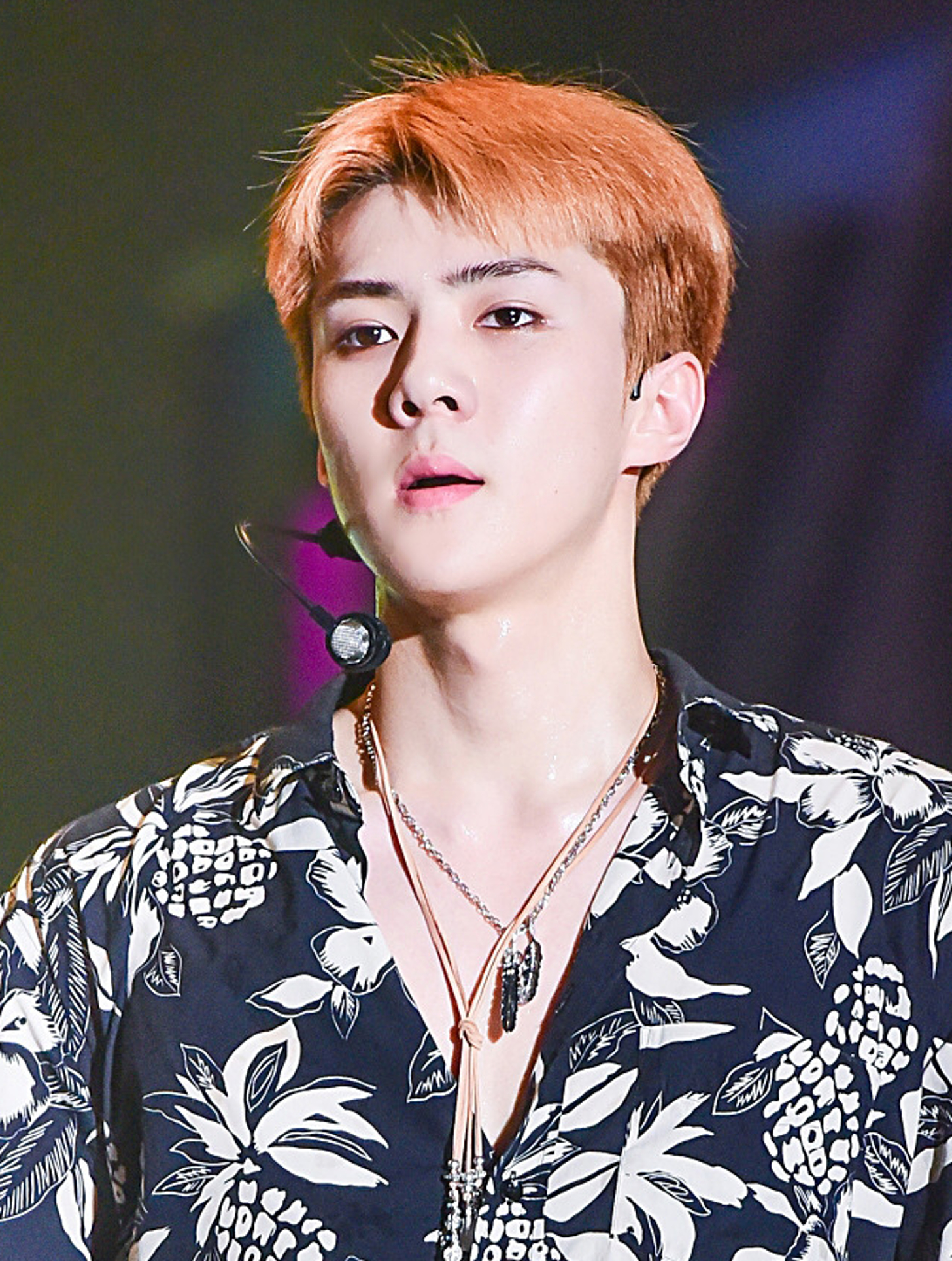
Sehun at Show! Music Core on July 24, 2017

In September 2017, Sehun became a fixed cast member in a new Netflix original variety show Busted!.

In February 2018, Sehun was cast in the action web drama Dokgo Rewind as the male lead. In May, it was announced that Sehun will be starring in the web drama Secret Queen Makers which is produced by Lotte Duty Free. On September 14, Sehun with fellow Exo member Chanyeol released a collaborative single, "We Young", for SM Station X 0.

On June 28, 2019, it was confirmed that Sehun and Chanyeol were preparing to debut as the group's second sub-unit Exo-SC. They released their first EP, What a Life, on July 22.

On May 24, 2020, Sehun became the new brand spokesperson of Dr. Jart+ in China. After becoming the brand's spokesperson, Dr. Jart+ achieved the highest sales ever during China's mid-year shopping festival and Oh's limited mask set sold 20 thousand pieces in nine minutes.

In 2021, Sehun starred in the fantasy movie Catman which was released and became one of the first works released in China that has a South Korean star involved after the Korean Wave restriction in China. Later the same year, he played a supporting role in the SBS drama Now, We Are Breaking Up.

In 2022, Sehun made his cinema debut in the movie The Pirates: The Last Royal Treasure. In March, it was announced that Sehun would be playing the main role, Go Yoo, in the TVING original drama All That We Loved. The first and second episodes were released on May 5, 2023.

== Fashion ==
In 2017 and 2018, Sehun attended Louis Vuitton's fashion shows in Paris. He was announced as the Best Dressed Man in Louis Vuitton's show consecutively for both years.

In January 2017, Vogue Korea released a pictorial with Sehun wearing products from the Moncler Gamme Bleu 2017 Collection. In December, Sehun attended Moncler's Hong Kong flagship opening party.

In 2018, Sehun became the second South Korean male idol after G-Dragon to be featured on the cover of Vogue Korea for its 22nd anniversary. It became the best-selling issue since the magazine's inception in 1996. Sehun became the ambassador for the Italian luxury fashion house Zegna's clothing line XXX alongside Chinese singer and actor William Chan.

In January 2020, Sehun attended Berluti's fashion show in Paris. He then modeled for the brand's 2020 Spring/Summer Menswear Collection, and the pictorial and fashion films were released through W Korea's March issue. In September, Sehun was announced as one of the three protagonists in Cartier's digital project, Pasha De Cartier. Sehun was announced as the new face of Dior Men in October 2020. Sehun was announced as Dior's first male global ambassador in December 2021.

== Personal life ==
=== Military service ===
On December 13, 2023, Sehun announced through Exo's official fan club that he would fulfill his military mandatory service as a social service worker on December 21. He was discharged on September 20, 2025.

== Discography ==
=== Singles ===
Title	Year	Peak chart position			Album
Title	Year	KOR		US World	Album
Title	Year	Gaon	Billboard	US World	Album
As lead artist
"Dear My Girl"	2026	—	—	—	Non-album single
"Fade" (失重色) (with Sion of NCT Wish)	2026	—	—	—	Non-album single
Collaborations
"We Young" (with Chanyeol)	2018	72	71	3	Non-album single
Other charted songs
"Beat Maker"	2014	—	—	—	Exology Chapter 1: The Lost Planet
"—" denotes releases that did not chart or were not released in that region.

=== Songwriting ===
All credits are adapted from the Korea Music Copyright Association (KOMCA), unless stated otherwise.

Year	Artist	Song	Album	Lyrics		Music	
Year	Artist	Song	Album	Credited	With	Credited	With
2019	Sehun	"Go"	Non-album single	Yes	MQ, MZMC, White Kevin Clark, Woods Michael Clinton II, Bazzi Andrew	No	—N/a
2019	Exo-SC	"What a Life"	What a Life	Yes	Gaeko, Loey	No	—N/a
2019	Exo-SC	"Just Us 2" (있어 희미하게) (feat. Gaeko)	What a Life	Yes	Boi B, Loey	No	—N/a
2019	Exo-SC	"Closer to You" (부르면 돼)	What a Life	Yes	Gaeko, Hangzoo, Loey	No	—N/a
2019	Exo-SC	"Borderline" (선)	What a Life	Yes	Gaeko, Loey	No	—N/a
2019	Exo-SC	"Roller Coaster" (롤러코스터)	What a Life	Yes	Studio 519 (Loey, MQ, Jung Yong Jun, yunji), Gaeko	Yes	Studio 519 (Loey, MQ, Jung Yong Jun, yunji)
2019	Exo-SC	"Daydreamin'" (夢)	What a Life	Yes	Studio 519 (Loey, MQ, Jung Yong Jun, yunji)	Yes	Studio 519 (Loey, MQ, Jung Yong Jun, yunji)
2020	Exo-SC	"1 Billion Views" (10억뷰) (feat. Moon)	1 Billion Views	Yes	Gaeko, Boi B, Loey	No	—N/a
2020	Exo-SC	"Say It" (feat. Penomeco)	1 Billion Views	Yes	Gaeko, THAMA, Loey, Penomeco	No	—N/a
2020	Exo-SC	"Rodeo Station" (로데오역)	1 Billion Views	Yes	Gaeko, Boi B, Loey	No	—N/a
2020	Exo-SC	"Telephone" (척) (feat. 10cm)	1 Billion Views	Yes	Studio 519 (Loey, MQ, jeon yong-joon, yunji), Gaeko	Yes	Studio 519 (Loey, MQ, jeon yong-joon, yunji), Gaeko
2020	Exo-SC	"Jet Lag" (시차적응)	1 Billion Views	Yes	Gaeko, Hangzoo, Loey	No	—N/a
2020	Exo-SC	"Fly Away" (날개) (feat. Gaeko)	1 Billion Views	Yes	Studio 519 (Loey, MQ, jeon yong-joon, yunji), Gaeko	Yes	Studio 519 (Loey, MQ, jeon yong-joon, yunji), Gaeko
2020	Exo-SC	"On Me"	1 Billion Views	Yes	Studio 519 (Loey, MQ, jeon yong-joon, yunji), Gaeko	Yes	Studio 519 (Loey, MQ, jeon yong-joon, yunji), Gaeko

== Videography ==
=== Music videos ===
Title	Year	Ref.
"We Young" (with Chanyeol)	2018	
"On Me"	2020	
"Yo!" (remake; Shinhwa)	2014	

== Filmography ==
=== Film ===
Year	Title	Role(s)	Notes	Ref.
2022	The Pirates: The Last Royal Treasure	Han-goong		
2021	Catman	Liang Qu	Chinese film	

=== Television series ===
Year	Title	Role(s)	Notes	Ref.
2012	To the Beautiful You	Himself	Cameo (Episode 2)	
2013	Royal Villa	Himself	Cameo (Episode 2)	
2021–2022	Now, We Are Breaking Up	Hwang Chi-hyung		

=== Web series ===
Year	Title	Role(s)	Ref.
2015	Exo Next Door	Himself	
2018	Secret Queen Makers	Himself	
2018	Dokgo Rewind	Kang Hyuk / Kang Hoo	
2023	All That We Loved	Go Yoo	

=== Television shows ===
Year	Title	Role	Notes	Ref.
2021	On Rent: House on Wheels	Cast member	with Team actor (The Pirates 2)	

=== Web shows ===
Year	Title	Role	Notes	Ref.
2018–2021	Busted!	Cast member	Season 1–3	

== Ambassadorship ==
Year	Title	Ref.
2018	Ermenegildo Zegna Brand Ambassador	
2019	Presenter for Tao Kae Noi	
2020	Dr. Jart+ China Brand Ambassador	
2020	Some by Mi Brand Ambassador	
2020	Face of Dior Men	
2021	Dior Global Ambassador	
2022	White Lab Brand Ambassador	

== Awards and nominations ==
Year presented, name of the award ceremony, award category, nominee of the award and the result of the nomination
Year	Award ceremony	Category	Nominee/Work	Result	Ref.
2016	Gaon Chart K-Pop Awards	Weibo Kpop Star Award	Oh Se-hun	Won	
2017	Gaon Chart K-Pop Awards	Artist of Fans' Choice – Individual	Oh Se-hun	Won	
2017	YinYueTai V-Chart Awards	Most Popular Artist	Oh Se-hun	Won	
2017	Celeb's Pick x Naver Fashion Beauty Fashionista Award	Global Icon	Oh Se-hun	Won	
2017	Peeper x Billboard Korea Award	December Top K-Pop Artist Award (Individual)	Oh Se-hun	Won	
2017	5th V Chart Awards	Most Popular Artist Tonight	Oh Se-hun	Won	
2018	Asia Artist Awards	Starpay Popularity Award (Actor)	Oh Se-hun	Won	
2019	Weibo Starlight Awards	Overseas Male Artist Award	Oh Se-hun	Won	
2019	Soompi Awards	Best Idol Actor	Dokgo Rewind	Won	
2019	Asia Artist Awards	AAA x Dongnam Media & FPT Polytechnic Award (Actor)	Oh Se-hun	Won	
