= Bird (Exo song) =

2019 Japanese single by Exo

Single by Exo
- Language: Japanese
- Released: October 10, 2019
- Recorded: 2019
- Genre: J-pop; R&B
- Length: 4:04
- Label: Avex Trax
- Composers: Fast Lane; Sky Beats; Rico Green
- Lyricist: Natsumi Kobayashi

Exo singles chronology
"Love Shot" (2018)	"Bird" (2019)	"Obsession" (2019)

Exo Japanese singles chronology
"Electric Kiss" (2018)	"Bird" (2019)

Alternative cover
- The Best version cover

"Bird" is a song by South Korean–Chinese boy band Exo, released on October 10, 2019. It is the first song to be released as a six-member group.

== Release and composition ==
"Bird" was the first single to be released as a six-member group after Xiumin and D.O. enlisted for their mandatory military service. The song was first released digitally on October 10, before it was released physically on November 4, commemorating their fourth anniversary since debuting in Japan. With a mid-tempo arrangement, the lyrics convey the members feeling with their fanbase.

== Live performance ==
The song was performed live in Exo's fifth world tour, Exo Planet 5 – Exploration during its Japanese stop in Fukuoka's Marine Messe Arena on October 11, and in Yokohama's Yokohama Arena on October 22 and October 23.

== Track listing ==
- CD single
1. "Bird" – 4:04
2. "Bird" (less vocal) – 4:04

== Re-release ==
"Bird" was re-released as an octet on April 15, 2023, with the song now featuring the vocals of eight members, including Xiumin and D.O. who were absent from the original version. Exo performed the new version at EXO Channel: The Best fan meeting event in Japan.

== Live performances ==
Following the fan meeting event where the group performed the song with eighth members, "Bird" has also been featured on Suho's SU:HOME concert tour in 2024 for its Japan stop. Chanyeol followed suit a year later for the "Chanyeol Japan Tour 2025 -The Days-" fan meeting concert tour.

== Charts ==
Chart performance for "Bird"
Chart (2019)	Peak position
Japan Hot 100 (Billboard Japan)	42

== Release history ==
Release dates and formats for "Bird"
Region	Date	Format	Version	Label
Various	October 10, 2019	Digital download; streaming	Original	Avex Trax
Japan	November 4, 2019	CD single; DVD-Video; Blu-ray	Original	Avex Trax
Various	April 15, 2023	Digital download; streaming	The Best	Avex Trax
