= Closer to You (Exo-SC song) =

Single by Exo-SC

from the EP What a Life
- Language: Korean
- Released: July 22, 2019
- Recorded: 2019
- Studio: Doobdoob (Seoul); SM Big Shot (Seoul)
- Genre: Hip hop
- Length: 3:07
- Label: SM; Dreamus
- Composers: Gaeko; Devine-Channel
- Lyricists: Gaeko; Hangzoo; Loey; Sehun
- Producer: Devine Channel

Exo-SC singles chronology
"Just Us 2" (2019)	"Closer to You" (2019)	"Telephone" (2020)

Music video
- "Closer to You" on YouTube

"Closer to You" (Korean: 부르면 돼; RR: buleumyeon dwae; lit. 'You Can Call Me'; Stylized as Closer to you) is a song recorded by South Korean hip hop duo Exo-SC, the second official sub-unit of the South Korean-Chinese boy group Exo. It was released on July 22, 2019 by SM Entertainment as one of the three title tracks of their debut extended play What a Life.

== Background and release ==
"Closer to You" is a hip hop song with a romantic sensibility. It's described as an impressive song with an emotional melody and a highly addictive chorus with lyrics about expressing the desire to be closer to the person. Chanyeol and Sehun participated in writing the lyrics with hip hop group Rhythm Power's member Hangzoo.

On July 31, a cam video of the two members separately of their performance of "Closer to You" on their showcase were released.

== Music video ==
On July 18, a teaser of "Closer to You" was released along with the other two title tracks of What a Life EP. On July 25, the official music video of "Closer to You" was released.

On July 30, "Closer to You" music video behind photos of Sehun were released. On July 31, behind photos of Chanyeol of "Closer to You" music video were released. On August 1, "Closer to You" behind photos of the duo together were released.

== Live performance ==
EXO-SC performed "Closer to You" for the first time on Exo's 5th concert Exo Planet 5 - Exploration on July 19, and continued to do so for all the concerts in the tour.

On July 22, EXO-SC performed "Closer to You" at their two showcases for the press and for the fans.

== Credits and personnel ==
Credits adapted from the EP's liner notes.

Studio

- SM Big Shot Studio – recording
- Doobdoob Studio – recording, digital editing
- SM SSAM Studio – engineered for mix
- SM Yellow Tail Studio – mixing
- 821 Sound – mastering

Personnel

- SM Entertainment – executive producer
- Lee Soo-man – producer
- Lee Sung-soo – production director
- Kim Young-min – executive supervisor
- Yoo Young-jin – music and sound supervisor
- Exo-SC – vocals
  - Loey – lyrics
  - Sehun – lyrics
- Gaeko – lyrics, composition, vocal directing, background vocals
- Hangzoo – lyrics
- Devine-Channel – producer, composition, arrangement
  - Lim Kwang-wook – drums, bass, piano, synthesizer
- Lee Min-kyu – recording
- Jang Woo-young – recording, digital editing
- Noh Min-ji – engineered for mix
- Koo Jong-pil – mixing
- Kwon Nam-woo – mastering

== Charts ==
Chart (2019)	Peak position
South Korea (Circle)	120

== Release history ==
Region	Date	Format	Label
South Korea	July 22, 2019	Digital download; streaming	SM; Dreamus
Various	July 22, 2019	Digital download; streaming	SM
