= Dear Archimedes =

South Korean-Chinese web drama

- Also known as: My Dear Archimedes
- Genre: Web series; Suspense; Romantic
- Directed by: Zhang Silin
- Starring: Oh Se-hun; Xu Ling Yue; Yang Ye Ming; Wang Zi Xuan
- Countries of origin: China; South Korea
- Original language: Mandarin
- No. of episodes: 20

Production
- Production companies: Ling Meng Pictures; Le Yang

Dear Archimedes (Chinese: 亲爱的阿基米德; lit. 'My Dear Achimedes') is a South Korean-Chinese web drama starring Oh Se-hun and Xu Ling Yue. The drama is based on a Chinese novel of the same name.

== Plot ==
The story of a genius logician, Yan Su (Oh Se-hun), who lives in a mysterious castle, isolated from the outside world. He works to solve inscrutable and complicated cases. One day, Zhen Ai (Xu Ling Yue), a clever biologist, walks into his castle to help him in solving a cryptic code.

== Cast ==
- Oh Se-hun as Yan Su
- Xu Ling Yue as Zhen Ai
- Yang Ye Ming
- Wang Zi Xuan

== Production ==
Filming started on September 14, 2016 and took place in South Korea. The show was never aired due to the imposed hallyu ban in China.
