= Secret Queen Makers =

South Korean promotional web series

- Promotional poster
- Hangul: 퀸카메이커
- RR: Kwinka meikeo
- MR: K'wink'a meik'ŏ
- Genre: Romance; Comedy
- Written by: Lee Se-ra
- Directed by: Lee Chang-min; Kim Sang-hoon
- Starring: Go Won-hee
- Country of origin: South Korea
- Original language: Korean
- No. of episodes: 7

Production
- Producer: Han Suk-won
- Running time: 15 minutes
- Production companies: Lotte; Daehong Communication; Zium Content

Original release
- Network: Naver TV Cast
- Release: June 4 – June 19, 2018

Secret Queen Makers (Korean: 퀸카메이커) is a South Korean promotional web series produced for Lotte Duty Free Shop. It premiered online through Naver TV Cast and YouTube every Monday, Tuesday and Thursday starting from June 4 to June 19, 2018.

== Synopsis ==
A travel agent who lacks confidence in her appearance finds her hidden beauty with the help of six men met at Lotte Duty Free stores.

== Cast ==
- Go Won-hee as Ahn Gong-joo
- Lee Joon-gi as himself (Ep. 1, 6)
- Hwang Chan-sung as himself (Ep. 1–2)
- Leeteuk as himself (Ep. 2–3)
- Hwang Chi-yeul as himself (Ep. 3–4)
- Park Chanyeol as himself (Ep. 4–5)
- Oh Se-hun as himself (Ep. 6–7)
- Jin Hye-won as Wang Bit-na

== List of episodes ==
Episode #	Date	Title
1	June 4, 2018	Fateful Encounter (운명적인 만남)
2	June 5, 2018	The Grim Reaper? The Messenger of Beauty! (저승사자? 미의 전령!)
3	June 7, 2018	In Search of Lost Time (잃어버린 시간을 찾아서)
4	June 11, 2018	It's The First Time I Meet a Girl Like You (너 같은 여자는 처음이야)
5	June 12, 2018	It's The First Time I Meet a Girl Like You (너 같은 여자는 처음이야)
6	June 14, 2018	Her Transformation Begins (그녀의 변신이 시작된다)
7	June 19, 2018	An Unexpected Gift (뜻밖의 선물)

== Original soundtrack ==
Secret Queen Makers Original Soundtrack

Soundtrack album by Various artists
- Released: 14 June 2018
- Genre: Soundtrack
- Label: NHN Bugs

No.	Title	Artist	Length
1.	"Today More Than Yesterday (어제보다 오늘 더 널)"	Eunhyuk	3:34
2.	"Pretty (예뻐져요)"	Jo Eun-ae	3:26
Total length:			7:00
