= Exo-SC =

Sub-unit of Exo

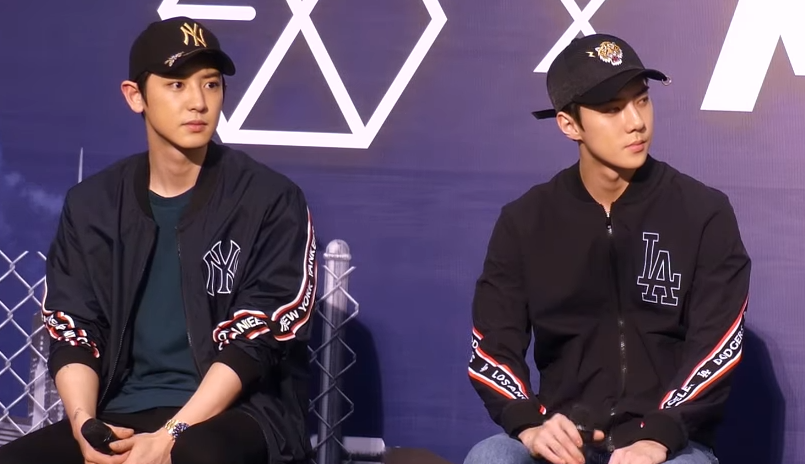
- EXO-SC at MLB event in 2018.

Background information
- Origin: Seoul, South Korea
- Genres: hip hop; R&B; K-hip-hop
- Years active: 2019–2020
- Label: SM
- Spinoff of: Exo
- Members: Chanyeol; Sehun
- Website: Official website

Exo-SC (Korean: 세훈&찬열; RR: Sehun & Chanyeol; stylized in all caps) is a South Korean hip hop duo and the second sub-unit of South Korean-Chinese boy band Exo, consisting of Chanyeol and Sehun. Their debut EP What a Life was released on July 22, 2019.

== History ==
=== 2019: Formation, debut and What a Life ===
During Exo's concert tour Exo Planet 4 – The Elyxion, Chanyeol and Sehun performed a song together titled "We Young" in Seoul and Macau in July and August 2018 respectively. The song was then released digitally through SM Station X 0 on September 14, 2018.

Chanyeol and Sehun debuted as Exo's second sub-unit and first duo in July. On June 28, the unit's name was announced to be Exo-SC (shortened from SeChan), after the first letter of the members' names. On the same day, it was announced that the unit will release their first extended play titled What a Life on July 22, which contains six tracks. Exo-SC received their first-ever music show win on KBS's Music Bank on August 2, eleven days after their debut.

=== 2020: Endorsement and 1 Billion Views ===
On June 12, Cass Fresh, a notable beer in South Korea, announced that Exo-SC became their brand endorser. On June 23, it was announced that the unit will release their first full album 1 Billion Views on July 13, which contains nine tracks.

With the release of their debut album, they became the best-selling subunit in Korea for selling a combined 900,000 album sales since their debut and selling 500,000 copies with their first full-length album, which also holds the record of the highest sales for an album by a subunit, extending their record and surpassing their own record with their debut extended play What a Life.

== Discography ==
=== Studio albums ===
List of studio albums, with selected chart positions and certifications
Title	Details	Peak chart positions					Sales	Certification
Title	Details	KOR	JPN	JPN Hot.	POL	UK Dig.	Sales	Certification
1 Billion Views	Released: July 13, 2020; Label: SM Entertainment; Formats: CD, digital download, streaming	1	10	16	22	65	KOR: 540,754; JPN: 5,824	KMCA: 2× Platinum

=== Extended plays ===
List of EPs, with selected chart positions, sales and certifications
Title	Details	Peak chart positions								Sales	Certification
Title	Details	KOR	JPN	JPN Hot.	POL	UK Dig.	US Heat	US Indie	US World	Sales	Certification
What a Life	Released: July 22, 2019; Label: SM Entertainment; Formats: CD, digital download, streaming	1	19	26	43	78	10	32	8	KOR: 417,227; JPN: 5,436; US: 1,000	KMCA: Platinum

=== Singles ===
List of singles, with selected chart positions and sales
Title	Year	Peak chart positions		Sales	Album
Title	Year	KOR		Sales	Album
Title	Year	Circle	Billb. (Note: Includes the Billboard K-pop Hot 100 (defunct as of 2022), and South Korea Songs (part of Billboard's Hits of the World (2022 onwards).)	Sales	Album
"What a Life"	2019	83	1	—N/a	What a Life
"Just Us 2" (있어 희미하게) (featuring Gaeko)	2019	107	3	—N/a	What a Life
"Closer to You" (부르면 돼)	2019	120	—	—N/a	What a Life
"Telephone" (척) (featuring 10cm)	2020	72	25	—N/a	1 Billion Views
"1 Billion Views" (10억뷰) (featuring Moon)	2020	24	—	—N/a	1 Billion Views
"—" denotes releases that did not chart or were not released in that region.

=== Other charted songs ===
List of other charted songs, with selected chart positions
Title	Year	Peak chart positions	Album
Title	Year	KOR	Album
Title	Year	Gaon	Album
"Borderline" (선)	2019	189	What a Life
"Roller Coaster" (롤러코스터)	2019	195	What a Life
"Say It" (featuring Penomeco)	2020	145	1 Billion Views
"Rodeo Station" (로데오역)	2020	136	1 Billion Views
"Jet Lag" (시차적응)	2020	168	1 Billion Views
"Fly Away" (날개) (featuring Gaeko)	2020	162	1 Billion Views
"Nothin'"	2020	198	1 Billion Views
"On Me"	2020	188	1 Billion Views

== Filmography ==
=== Television shows ===
Title	Year	Network	Role	Notes
My Little Television V2	2019	MBC, Twitch	—N/a	Episodes 18-19

=== Music videos ===
Title	Year	Ref.
"Just Us 2" (있어 희미하게) (featuring Gaeko)	2019	
"What a Life"	2019	
"Closer to You"	2019	
"Telephone" (척) (featuring 10cm)	2020	
"1 Billion Views" (10억뷰) (featuring Moon)	2020	

== Concerts and tours ==
=== Headlining ===
- Back to Back Fancon (2023)

Back to Back Fancon (2023)
Date (2023)	City	Country	Venue	Attendance
February 5	Jakarta	Indonesia	Beach City International Stadium	
May 14	Kuala Lumpur	Malaysia	Mega Star Arena	
May 17	Singapore		The Star Theatre	
May 20	Manila	Philippines	Smart Araneta Coliseum	
August 5	Bangkok	Thailand	Queen Sirikit National Convention Center	
August 6	Bangkok	Thailand	Queen Sirikit National Convention Center	

== Awards and nominations ==
Name of the award ceremony, year presented, award category, nominee(s) of the award, and the result of the nomination
Award ceremony	Year	Category	Nominee / Work	Result	Ref.
Gaon Chart Music Awards	2020	Artist of the Year - 3rd Quarter	1 Billion Views	Nominated	
Gaon Chart Music Awards	2020	MuBeat Global Choice Award - Male	Exo-SC	Nominated	
Genie Music Awards	2020	Artist of the Year	Exo-SC	Nominated	
Golden Disc Awards	2019	Disc Bonsang	What a Life	Won	
Golden Disc Awards	2019	Disc Daesang	What a Life	Nominated	
Golden Disc Awards	2020	Disc Bonsang	1 Billion Views	Nominated	
Seoul Music Awards	2019	Popularity Award	Exo-SC	Nominated	
Seoul Music Awards	2019	Hallyu Special Award	Exo-SC	Nominated	
Seoul Music Awards	2019	Bonsang Award	Exo-SC	Nominated	
Seoul Music Awards	2019	QQ Music Most Popular K-Pop Artist Award	Exo-SC	Nominated	
