= Love Shot =

2018 single by Exo

Single by Exo

from the album Love Shot
- Language: Korean; Mandarin
- Released: December 13, 2018
- Recorded: 2018
- Studio: Doobdoob (Seoul)
- Genre: Dance-pop
- Length: 3:20
- Label: SM; iriver
- Composers: Mike Woods (Rice N' Peas); Kevin White (Rice N' Peas); MZMC; Andrew Bazzi; Anthony Russo
- Lyricists: Louis Tomlinson; Chen; Chanyeol; Jo Yoon-kyung (Korean); Lu Yiqiu (Chinese)
- Producer: Rice N' Peas

Exo singles chronology
"Tempo" (2018)	"Love Shot" (2018)	"Bird" (2019)

Music video
- "Love Shot (Korean ver.)" on YouTube "Love Shot (Chinese ver.)" on YouTube

"Love Shot" is a song by South Korean–Chinese boy band Exo, released on December 13, 2018, for the album Love Shot, a repackage of the group's fifth studio album Don't Mess Up My Tempo (2018). The music video was released on the same date.

== Background and composition ==
Produced by Rice N' Peas, "Love Shot" is described as a pop dance track. Members Chen and Chanyeol wrote the song, with lyrics on rediscovering the meaning of true love. Louis Tomlinson has writing credits.

Talking to Billboard about co-composing the song, Mike Woods stated that the song was developed in January 2017, and stated that he and the other composers MZMC, Bazzi, Kevin White and Anthony Russo, "wanted something that was very, very performance-driven, very dance-driven — something that would sound good loud and in an arena. We like the fact that it's kind of in a different time signature — it's in 6/8, so that's not like a generic pop song.", Woods also stated that the original title of the song is "Love Shop". Despite comments by Woods that the song is in 6/8 time signature, this track makes use of 4/4 timing at the tempo of 72 BPM, and is in the key of C minor. Both the instrumental and vocal melodies feature the use of sixteenth note triplet rhythms.

== Music video ==
On December 6, the first teaser of "Love Shot" music video was released. On December 11, the second teaser of "Love Shot" music video was released. The official Korean music video of "Love Shot" was released on December 13. The Chinese version of the music video was released on December 14.

The music video shows the members switching places between the gritty locale of a gas station and luxurious trappings, before participating in a shoot-out with unexpected enemies. The video also shows the group's sensual choreography. On March 4, 2019, the Korean music video surpassed 100 million views on YouTube. It surpassed 200 and 300 million views on October 15, 2019, and August 18, 2020, respectively, becoming their fastest music video to reach all three milestones.

== Promotion ==
Exo began promoting "Love Shot" without member Lay on South Korean music shows starting from December 14.

== Reception ==
"Love Shot" topped Billboard's World Digital Songs for three consecutive weeks, making Exo the second K-pop act to do so. British fashion magazine i-D ranked the song number seven in their list of K-pop highlights of the year while SBS PopAsia ranked it the 18th best K-pop dance of 2018.

== Accolades ==
Awards and nominations
Year	Organization	Award	Result	Ref.
2019	Melon Music Awards	Song of the Year	Nominated	
2019	Melon Music Awards	Best Male Dance Track	Nominated	
2020	Golden Disc Awards	Digital Bonsang	Nominated	
2020	Gaon Chart Music Awards	Song of the Year – December	Nominated	

Music program awards
Program	Date
Music Bank	December 21, 2018
Music Bank	December 28, 2018
Show! Music Core	December 22, 2018

Melon Popularity Award
Award	Date (2018–19)	Ref.
Weekly Popularity Award	December 24	
Weekly Popularity Award	December 31	
Weekly Popularity Award	January 7	
Weekly Popularity Award	January 14	
Weekly Popularity Award	January 21	

== Credits and personnel ==
Credits adapted from the album's liner notes.

=== Studio ===
- doobdoob Studio – recording, digital editing
- SM Big Shot Studio – engineered for mix
- SM LVYIN Studio – engineered for mix
- SM Blue Ocean Studio – mixing
- Sterling Sound – mastering

=== Personnel ===
- SM Entertainment – executive producer
- Lee Soo-man – producer
- Kim Young-min – executive supervisor
- Yoo Young-jin – music and sound supervisor
- Exo – vocals
  - Chen – Korean lyrics
  - Chanyeol – Korean lyrics
- Jo Yoon-kyung – Korean lyrics
- Lu Yiqiu – Chinese lyrics
- Mike Woods (Rice N' Peas) – producer, composition, arrangement
- Kevin White (Rice N' Peas) – producer, composition, arrangement
- Andrew Bazzi – composition, background vocals
- MZMC – composition
- Anthony Russo – composition
- Onestar – vocal directing, background vocals
- Eugene Kwon – recording
- Min Sung-soo – recording
- Jang Woo-young – digital editing
- Lee Min-gyu – engineered for mix
- Lee Ji-hong – engineered for mix
- Kim Cheol-sun – mixing
- Chris Gehringer – mastering

== Charts ==
=== Weekly charts ===
Chart (2018)	Peak position
Japan Hot 100 (Billboard)	9
Malaysia (RIM)	7
New Zealand Hot Singles (RMNZ)	19
Singapore (RIAS)	3
South Korea (Gaon)	9
South Korea (K-pop Hot 100)	1
UK Indie Breakers (OCC)	14
US World Digital Songs (Billboard)	1

=== Year-end charts ===
Chart (2019)	Position
South Korea (Gaon)	65

== Sales ==
Downloads
Region	Sales
China	20,380
United States	10,000

== Release history ==
Release history for "Love Shot"
Region	Date	Format	Label
South Korea	December 13, 2018	Digital download; streaming	SM; iRiver
Various	December 13, 2018	Digital download; streaming	SM
