= Don't Mess Up My Tempo =

- Digital cover

Studio album by Exo
- Released: November 2, 2018
- Studios: Doobdoob (Seoul); In Grid (Seoul); SM Big Shot (Seoul); SM Blue Ocean (Seoul); SM LVYIN (Seoul); The Vibe (Seoul)
- Genres: K-pop; hip hop; R&B
- Length: 39:10; 53:49 (repackaged edition)
- Languages: Korean; Mandarin; English
- Labels: SM; iriver

Exo chronology
Countdown (2018)	Don't Mess Up My Tempo (2018)	Exo Planet #4 – The EℓyXiOn [dot] (2019)

Singles from Don't Mess Up My Tempo
- 1. "Tempo" Released: November 2, 2018

Repackage album cover
- Digital cover

Singles from Love Shot
- 1. "Love Shot" Released: December 13, 2018

Don't Mess Up My Tempo (stylized in all caps) is the fifth studio album by South Korean boy band Exo. It was released on November 2, 2018, by SM Entertainment. Member Lay is featured in the Chinese version of lead track, "Tempo", marking his first appearance with the group since Winter EP, For Life (2016). It is available in four versions: Allegro, Moderato, Andante and Vivace, named after types of tempo. The album debuted at number one on the Gaon Album Chart. The album was repackaged as Love Shot on December 13, 2018.

== Background and release ==
Don't Mess Up My Tempo is the band's fifth Korean studio album and sixth overall. It follows the band's first Japanese studio album Countdown, released in January 2018; their previous Korean release was the EP Universe, released in December 2017. It was announced in October 2018 that the album is the band's first since Ex'Act in 2016 (and its repackage Lotto) to feature Lay, who has focused on his own singing and acting career in China. Lay participated in recording the Mandarin version of the lead single "Tempo", and also appears in its music video.

On October 21, a 30-second Tempo Concept short film teaser was released through their social media accounts, depicting them as a biker gang, and playing a short audio snippet of the album's lead single "Tempo", which Billboard describes as "starting off with a dramatic synth melody, pulsating beat and the phrase 'I can't believe.'" The group's social media accounts updated their avatars to red cube icons, and revealed a poster with a caption that reads: "Speed loving bikers enter the fragment of frozen time as they log into the red cube. Solving the given puzzle is the only route for all to escape. However, the bikers are unable to resist the temptation and reenter the cube."

The caption also appeared in the interactive puzzle game "Circuit Exo", created for the promotional period which, consistent with the comeback concept, showing a motorcycle running around a mini car track formed as "EXO". In order to stop the motorcycle, fans were asked to enter the jersey number of the EXO member whose teaser has been released that day. Upon entering the correct number, the motorcycle stopped and a red cube appeared to hover above it, and clicking on it revealed exclusive teaser images.

SM Entertainment began releasing teasers on October 22 through Exo's official social media accounts. Further details about the album were also revealed on October 23, with the design and content of the three versions being released. On October 31, the "Tempo" music video teaser was released alongside two posters: one featuring all nine members of the group, as well as one containing only the text "End = Beginning". The album and its title track's Korean music video were released on November 2 both digitally and physically. The Chinese music video was released several hours later.

On November 11, 2018, it was announced by Kai and Suho that the album would be repackaged without Lay. The title of the repackaged album, Love Shot, was revealed on December 3. SM Entertainment began releasing teasers from December 6 through Exo's official social media accounts. The repackaged album and its title track's music video were released on December 13, 2018.

== Music ==
Don't Mess Up My Tempo features eleven songs of different genres. The title track "Tempo" is described as hip-hop leaning dance track which showcases a cappella harmonies with lyrics that warn not to "mess up his tempo" with a lover.

"Sign" is an electropop track with an intense bass and "bombastic" groove with lyrics expressing a man's growing doubt due to lies told by the woman he loves. The third song "Ooh La La La" is a Latin pop song, combining a heavy 808 bass and an "exotic" atmosphere of Spanish guitar. The lyrics of the song are about imagined love when two people accidentally make eye contact. "Gravity" is characterized as an electropop track with a retro sound and funky rhythm, which the British duo LDN Noise worked on. The lyrics were co-written by member Chanyeol, and are described as about the desire to capture a girl's attention with gravity and charm.

"With You" is described as an R&B and pop track with a "bright" synthesizer and electro-trap elements. Member Chanyeol participated in writing and composing the song. The lyrics are about growing to like someone more when one spends more time with them. "24/7" is a midtempo song with a modern sound and memorable catchy phrases. Kenzie participated in writing the lyrics, which express complex emotions after one says "cold words" to their lover. "Bad Dream" is characterized as an uptempo R&B song, where the "sophisticated" guitar riff and poppy synthesizer's dynamic melody line go well together with lyrics about one thinking about their past lover alone at night, with comparisons to a storm.

"Damage" is a hip hop and dance song with a bass-heavy and reggae rhythm, with its lyrics expressing the "cold" reaction one has after getting hurt by their lover, and giving back the pain they experienced like a "sudden flash of lightning", while "Smile On My Face" is described as an R&B ballad with soft melodies and simple yet "sophisticated" grooves, with lyrics about healing one's own pain after a breakup, smiling and "letting their love go". The last song "Oasis" is an elliptical pop song with a combination of staccato piano and strings, heavy 808 bass, and a grand harmony.

Love Shot features four new songs, including the title track "Love Shot" (in Korean and Chinese) which is described as a pop dance track that features a memorably addictive chorus and heavy 808 bass. Members Chen and Chanyeol participated in writing the lyrics that talk about hoping to be together and rediscover the meaning of true love, which seems to be disappearing more and more from a dreary world.

"Trauma" is an upbeat pop dance song with lyrics expressing the intention to overcome the pain one feels, while "Wait" is described as an R&B ballad with an acoustic guitar melody and harmonizes with the members' vocals.

== Promotion ==
On November 1, Exo held a press conference where they gave a pre-listening session for Don’t Mess Up My Tempo and talked about their comeback, the album making, and the pre-sales surpassing 1.1 million. Exo began promoting lead single "Tempo" and "Ooh La La La" on South Korean music programs on November 2. On the same day, the group held a live showcase at Paradise City in Incheon where they talked about their album and performed four songs, "Ooh La La La", "Smile On My Face", "24/7", and "Tempo".

On November 10, Exo held a fansign event at the SMTown COEXartium, and a second fansign event on November 16 at the GLAD Hotel Grand Ballroom. The third fansign was held Gangnam at the White Hall Art Theater on November 18.

Exo had their first music show performance for the lead single of the repackaged album on December 14. One day later, the group held a fansign in Seocho at the White Wave Art Center. On December 20, EXO held a fan event called 0xFESTA by SK Telecom where they performed "Tempo", "24/7", "Love Shot", and "Wait". The last fansign for Love Shot was held in Samseong-dong on December 21.

== Commercial performance ==
On October 31, 2018, 28 days after the opening of pre-orders, it was announced that Don't Mess Up My Tempo had exceeded 1.1 million pre-orders. The album went on to debut at number one on the Gaon Album Chart for the week of November 3, 2018. As of November 11, the album had sold 1,179,997 million copies, officially making Exo a quintuple million-selling group, and the first act in South Korea to sell over 10,000,000+ copies cumulatively across all albums. It eventually became the top-selling album of November 2018 on Gaon Album Chart with a total of 1,195,334 sales. The album was certified "Million" by Gaon on January 10, 2019.

The album also attained international success by debuting at number 23 on the US Billboard 200, making it Exo's highest-charting album in the United States. It achieved 23,000 album-equivalent units, including 19,000 pure album sales. Exo became the third K-pop group to have an album chart in the top 40 of the US Billboard 200.

The repackaged album debuted at number one on the Gaon Album Chart for the week of December 15, 2018. Additionally, it peaked at number 8 on the Billboard World Albums Chart and number 3 on the Oricon Chart in Japan. In February, the album was received a Double Platinum KMCA certification.

== Awards and nominations ==
Awards and nominations
Year	Award	Category	Nominated work	Result	Ref.
2019	Golden Disc Awards	Disc Bonsang	Don't Mess Up My Tempo	Won	
2019	Philippine K-pop Awards	Album of the Year	Don't Mess Up My Tempo	Won	
2019	Gaon Chart Music Awards	Album of the Year – 4th Quarter	Don't Mess Up My Tempo	Won	
2019	Gaon Chart Music Awards	Album of the Year – 4th Quarter	Love Shot	Nominated	
2019	Mnet Asian Music Awards	Album of the Year	Don't Mess Up My Tempo	Nominated	

Select critic rankings
Critic/Publication	List	Rank	Ref.
Billboard	20 Best K-Pop Albums of 2018	5	
Billboard	25 Greatest K-Pop Albums of the 2010s	16	
Idolator	10 Best K-Pop Albums of 2018	4	
MTV	18 Best K-pop B-sides of 2018 (for "Gravity")	3	
Rolling Stone India	10 Best K-Pop Albums of 2018	5	
Refinery29	12 Best K-Pop Albums of 2018	4	
Bravo	Best K-pop albums of the year	5	

== Track listing ==
Credits adapted from Spotify, Apple Music and Naver.

Don't Mess Up My Tempo
No.	Title	Lyrics	Music	Arrangement	Length
1.	"Tempo"	Penomeco; Yoo Young-jin; JQ (Makeumine Works)	Jamil "Digi" Chammas; Leven Kali; Jeremy "Tay" Jasper; Adrian McKinnon; MZMC	Jamil "Digi" Chammas	3:44
2.	"Sign"	JQ (Makeumine Works); Mola (Makeumine Works); Park Yu-rim (Makeumine Works)	Harvey Mason Jr. (The Underdogs); Damon Thomas (The Underdogs); Kevin Randolph; Patrick "J. Que" Smith; Dewain Whitmore; Britt Burton; Andrew Hey	The Underdogs; Kevin Randolph	3:13
3.	"Ooh La La La" (닿은 순간; Daheun Sungan; lit. 'Moment of Touch')	Hwang Yoo-bin	Jamil "Digi" Chammas; Andrew Bazzi; Justin Lucas; Anthony Pavel; MZMC	Jamil "Digi" Chammas; Justin Lucas	3:07
4.	"Gravity"	Chanyeol; Jeon Gan-di	LDN Noise; Deez; Adrian McKinnon	LDN Noise; Deez	3:54
5.	"With You" (가끔; Gakkeum; lit. 'Sometimes')	Chanyeol; Kim Min-ji	Chanyeol; Sons of Sonix	Sons of Sonix	3:08
6.	"24/7"	Kenzie	Harvey Mason Jr.; The Wavys; The Wildcardz; Aaron Berton; Andrew Hey	The Wavys; The Wildcardz	4:03
7.	"Bad Dream" (후폭풍; Hupokpung; lit. 'After Storm')	Seo Ji-eum	Mike Daley; Mitchell Owens; Bianca Atterberry; Deez	Mike Daley; Mitchell Owens	3:56
8.	"Damage"	Shin Jin-hye	LDN Noise; Deez; Adrian McKinnon	LDN Noise; Deez	3:29
9.	"Smile On My Face" (여기 있을게; Yagi Isseulge; lit. 'I'll Be Here')	JQ (Makeumine Works); Park Ji-hee (Makeumine Works)	Brian Kennedy; Iain James; Samuel Jensen	Brian Kennedy	3:38
10.	"Oasis" (오아시스; Oasiseu)	Jo Yoon-kyung	Kevin White (Rice N' Peas); Mike Woods (Rice N' Peas); Andrew Bazzi (Rice N' Peas); MZMC	Rice N' Peas	3:14
11.	"Tempo" (节奏) (Chinese version)	Arys Chien	Jamil "Digi" Chammas; Leven Kali; Jeremy "Tay" Jasper; Adrian McKinnon; MZMC	Jamil "Digi" Chammas	3:44
Total length:					39:17

Love Shot
No.	Title	Lyrics	Music	Arrangement	Length
1.	"Love Shot"	Jo Yoon-kyung; Chen; Chanyeol	Mike Woods (Rice N' Peas); Kevin White (Rice N' Peas); Andrew Bazzi (Rice N' Peas); Anthony Russo; MZMC	Rice N' Peas	3:20
2.	"Tempo"	Penomeco; Yoo Young-jin; JQ (Makeumine Works)	Jamil "Digi" Chammas; Leven Kali; Jeremy "Tay" Jasper; Adrian McKinnon; MZMC	Jamil "Digi" Chammas	3:44
3.	"Trauma" (트라우마; Teurauma)	Jo Yoon-kyung	Keynon "KC" Moore (3Sixty); Cedric "Dabenchwarma" Smith (3Sixty); Ryan S. Jhun; Danny Jones (3Sixty)	3Sixty; Ryan S. Jhun	3:42
4.	"Wait"	Seo Ji-eum	Andreas Öberg; Jimmy Burney	Andreas Öberg; Jimmy Burney	4:08
5.	"Sign"	JQ (Makeumine Works); Mola (Makeumine Works)	Harvey Mason Jr. (The Underdogs); Damon Thomas (The Underdogs); Kevin Randolph; Patrick "J. Que" Smith; Dewain Whitmore; Britt Burton; Andrew Hey	The Underdogs; Kevin Randolph	3:13
6.	"Ooh La La La" (닿은 순간; Daheun Sungan; lit. 'Moment of Touch')	Hwang Yoo-bin	Jamil "Digi" Chammas; Andrew Bazzi; Justin Lucas; Anthony Pavel; MZMC	Jamil "Digi" Chammas; Justin Lucas	3:07
7.	"Gravity"	Chanyeol; Jeon Gan-di	LDN Noise; Deez; Adrian McKinnon	LDN Noise	3:54
8.	"With You" (가끔; Gakkeum; lit. 'Sometimes')	Chanyeol; Kim Min-ji	Chanyeol; Sons of Sonix	Sons of Sonix	3:08
9.	"24/7"	Kenzie	Harvey Mason Jr.; The Wavys; The Wildcardz; Aaron Berton; Andrew Hey	The Wavys; The Wildcardz	4:03
10.	"Bad Dream" (후폭풍; Hupogpung; lit. 'After Storm')	Seo Ji-eum	Mike Daley; Mitchell Owens; Bianca Atterberry; Deez	Mike Daley; Mitchell Owens	3:56
11.	"Damage"	Shin Jin-hye	LDN Noise; Deez; Adrian McKinnon	LDN Noise	3:29
12.	"Smile On My Face" (여기 있을게; Yagi Isseulge; lit. 'I'll Be Here')	JQ (Makeumine Works); Park Ji-hee (Makeumine Works)	Brian Kennedy; Iain James; Samuel Jensen	Brian Kennedy; Iain James	3:38
13.	"Oasis" (오아시스)	Jo Yoon-kyung	Kevin White (Rice N' Peas); Mike Woods (Rice N' Peas); Andrew Bazzi (Rice N' Peas); MZMC	Rice N' Peas	3:14
14.	"Love Shot" (宣告) (Chinese version)	Lu Yi Qiu	Kevin White (Rice N' Peas); Mike Woods (Rice N' Peas); Andrew Bazzi (Rice N' Peas); Anthony Russo; MZMC	Rice N' Peas	3:20
15.	"Tempo" (节奏) (Chinese version))	Arys Chien	Jamil "Digi" Chammas; Leven Kali; Jeremy "Tay" Jasper; Adrian McKinnon; MZMC	Jamil "Digi" Chammas	3:44
Total length:					53:49

== Charts ==
=== Weekly charts ===
Chart (2018)	Peak position	
Chart (2018)	DMUMT	Love Shot
Australian Albums (ARIA)	67	—
Belgian Albums (Ultratop Flanders)	84	—
Belgian Albums (Ultratop Wallonia)	158	—
Canadian Albums (Billboard)	74	—
Chinese Albums (YinYueTai)	1	—
Dutch Albums (Album Top 100)	90	—
Estonian Albums (Eesti Ekspress)	19	—
French Albums (SNEP)	191	—
Japanese Albums (Oricon)	3	3
Japan Hot Albums (Billboard Japan)	5	13
Latvian Albums (LAIPA)	30	16
Lithuanian Albums (AGATA)	19	—
South Korean Albums (Gaon)	1	1
UK Album Downloads (Official Charts)	19	—
UK Independent Albums (Official Charts)	24	—
US Billboard 200	23	—
US Independent Albums (Billboard)	1	45
US World Albums (Billboard)	1	8

=== Year-end charts ===
Chart (2018)	Position
Chinese Albums (YinYueTai)	1
South Korean Albums (Gaon)	3
US World Albums (Billboard)	8
Chart (2019)	Position
US Independent Albums (Billboard)	45
US World Albums (Billboard)	11

== Sales ==
Region	Sales		Total
Region	DMUMT	Love Shot	Total
Japan (Oricon)	64,613	—	64,613
South Korea (Gaon)	1,452,030	513,512	1,965,542
United States (Nielsen)	50,000	—	50,000

== Certifications and sales ==
Certifications and sales figures for Don't Mess Up My Tempo
Region	Certification	Certified units/sales
South Korea (KMCA) (Don't Mess Up My Tempo)	Million	1,452,030
South Korea (KMCA) (Love Shot)	2× Platinum	530,165

=== Critical reception ===
Professional ratings
Review scores
Source	Rating
SCMP	4/5 stars

== Release history ==
Edition	Region	Date	Format	Label
Don't Mess Up My Tempo	South Korea	November 2, 2018	CD; digital download; streaming	SM; iriver
Don't Mess Up My Tempo	United States	November 2, 2018	CD; digital download; streaming	SM; iriver
Don't Mess Up My Tempo	Various	November 2, 2018	Digital download; streaming	SM
Love Shot	South Korea	December 13, 2018	CD; digital download; streaming	SM; iriver
Love Shot	United States	December 13, 2018	CD; digital download; streaming	SM; iriver
Love Shot	Various	December 13, 2018	Digital download; streaming	SM

== See also ==
- List of best-selling albums in China
- List of best-selling albums in South Korea
- List of K-pop songs on the Billboard charts
- List of K-pop albums on the Billboard charts
- List of Gaon Album Chart number ones of 2018
