= K-pop Hot 100 =

South Korean record chart

The K-pop Hot 100 was a music singles chart in South Korea, launched by Billboard in conjunction with Billboard Korea (빌보드코리아) on August 25, 2011. It is the second Asian Billboard chart after the Japan Hot 100. The chart used the same multimetric methodology as the US Hot 100 and rankings were compiled based on Hanteo Chart data, streaming and download data from Naver VIBE, and domestic radio and television music playback data. Updates were published on Billboard Korea's website every Tuesday, and appeared on billboard.com the following day.

Silvio Pietroluongo, Billboard's Director of Charts, called the launch "a milestone event", as it would "provide the Korean music market with what we believe is Korea's most accurate and relevant song ranking." Pietroluongo further stated that they were "excited to be expanding Billboard's globally recognized Hot 100 chart franchise into this country, and look forward to enhancing the K-Pop Hot 100 chart in the near future with additional data as well as creating new charts that showcase the breadth of Korean music". Due to the Korean market having a more active distribution of digital music compared to physical album sales at the time of the chart's launch, initial rankings solely reflected digital sales from major music sites, as well as downloads from mobile service sites, weighted using Billboard's industry-standard formula. Weekly rankings were simultaneously announced in the United States and Korea on billboard.com in the international chart section of billboard.biz, in print editions of Billboard magazine, and also on the Billboard Korea website, billboard.co.kr. The first number-one song on the chart was "So Cool" by Sistar, on the issue dated September 3, 2011. Billboard suspended the chart in the United States effective the May 17, 2014 issue, but the final issue published was actually dated June 21. The Korean version of the chart was subsequently discontinued as of the July 16 issue date.

On December 20, 2017, Billboard officially announced the reactivation of the K-pop Hot 100, and the relaunch of the Billboard Korea website. Chart updates also resumed on billboard.com. The first issue of the reestablished chart was for the period May 29–June 4, 2017. Billboard suspended the Korean version of the chart without notice in 2022, effective the April 23 issue. The US edition of the chart was subsequently discontinued, effective the April 30 issue date. "Love Dive" by Ive was the final song to rank at number one. The chart was replaced by South Korea Songs chart from May 7, 2022.

== Achievement by artists ==
=== Artists with most number-one hits ===
Rank	Artist	Count	Songs (Note: Songs are listed oldest to newest.)
1st	IU	18 songs	"You & I" "Every End of the Day" "The Red Shoes" "Friday" "Not Spring, Love or Cherry Blossoms" (with High4) "My Old Story" "Love Story" (with Epik High) "SoulMate" (with Zico) "Bbibbi" "Love Poem" "Blueming" "Eight" (with Suga) "Celebrity" "Lilac" "Nakka" (with AKMU) "Strawberry Moon" "Winter Sleep" "Ganadara" (with Jay Park)
2nd	BTS	8 songs	"DNA" "Fake Love" "Idol" "Boy with Luv" (with Halsey) "On" "Dynamite" "Butter" "Permission to Dance"
3rd	Twice	6 songs	"Signal" "Likey" "Heart Shaker" "What Is Love?" "Dance the Night Away" "Feel Special"
4th	Exo	5 songs	"Ko Ko Bop" "Power" "Universe" "Tempo" "Love Shot"
5th	Sistar	4 songs	"So Cool" "Alone" "Loving U" "Give It to Me"
5th	Busker Busker	4 songs	"Tokyo Girl" "Cherry Blossom Ending" "If You Really Love Me" "Love, At First"
5th	K.Will	4 songs	"Please Don't" "Love Blossom" "You Don't Know Love" "Like a Star"

=== Artists with most weeks at number one (all songs) ===
Rank	Artist	Count
1st	IU	53 weeks
2nd	BTS	49 weeks
3rd	Sokodomo	12 weeks
3rd	Zion.T	12 weeks
3rd	Wonstein	12 weeks
4th	AKMU	10 weeks
5th	Twice	9 weeks

=== Artists with most number-one debuts (all songs) ===
Rank	Artist	Count	Songs
1st	IU	5 songs	"Every End of the Day" "Friday" "Celebrity" "Lilac" "Ganadara" (with Jay Park)
2nd	Twice	4 songs	"Heart Shaker" "What Is Love?" "Dance The Night Away" "Feel Special"
2nd	BTS	4 songs	"Idol" "Boy with Luv" "Butter" "Permission to Dance"
3rd	Busker Busker	3 songs	"Cherry Blossom Ending" "If You Really Love Me" "Love, at First"
3rd	Hyolyn	3 songs	"Crazy of You" "One Way Love" "Goodbye"
3rd	Exo	3 songs	"Universe" "Tempo" "Love Shot"
4th	Lee Seung-gi	2 songs	"Era of Love" "Return"
4th	Sistar	2 songs	"Alone" "Loving U"
4th	K.Will	2 songs	"Love Blossom" "Like a Star"
4th	Wanna One	2 songs	"Boomerang" "Spring Breeze"
4th	Zico	2 songs	"Soulmate" "Any Song"
4th	Red Velvet	2 songs	"Power Up" "Umpah Umpah"

=== Artists with most songs in top ten within the same week ===
Rank	Artist	Count	Songs/ Chart position	Issue Date	Ref.
1st	Wanna One	10 songs	"Beautiful" #1 "Wanna" #2 "Twilight" #3 "Nothing Without You (Intro.)" #4 "Energetic (Prequel Remix)" #5 "To Be One (Outro.)" #6 "Burn It Up (Prequel Remix)" #7 "Wanna Be (My Baby)" #8 "Energetic" #9 "Burn It Up" #10	November 26, 2017	
1st	BTS	10 songs	"Fake Love" #1 "The Truth Untold" #2 "Paradise" #3 "134340" #4 "Love Maze" #5 "Magic Shop" #6 "Anpanman" #7 "Airplane pt.2" #8 "So What" #9 "Intro: Singularity" #10	June 2, 2018	
1st	BTS	10 songs	"Idol" #1 "Euphoria" #2 "I'm Fine" #3 "Answer: Love Myself" #4 "Epiphany" #5 "Trivia: Just Dance#6 "Trivia: Seesaw" #7 "Trivia: Love" #8 "Serendipity (Full Length Edition)" #9 "Idol (featuring Nicki Minaj)" #10	September 1, 2018; September 8, 2018	
1st	EXO	10 songs	"Tempo" #1 "Ooh La La La" #2 "Gravity" #3 "Sign" #4 "24/7" #5 "With You" #6 "Smile On My Face" #7 "Bad Dream" #8 "Oasis" #9 "Damage" #10	November 10, 2018	
1st	Wanna One	10 songs	"Spring Breeze" #1 "One's Place" #2 "Flowerbomb" #3 "One Love" #4 "Hide and Seek" #5 "Deeper" #6 "Beautiful (Part II)" #7 "Awake!" #8 "Pine Tree" #9 "Destiny (Intro)" #10	December 1, 2018	
2nd	EXO	9 songs	"Ko Ko Bop" #1 "The Eve" #2 "What U do?" #3 "Walk On Memories" #4 "Forever" #5 "Touch It" #6 "Diamond" #7 "Chill" #8 "Going Crazy" #9	July 30, 2017	
2nd	BTS	9 songs	"DNA" #1 "Best Of Me" #2 "Dimple" #3 "Pied Piper" #4 "Go Go" #5 "MIC Drop" #6 "Intro _ Serendipity" #7 "Outro _ Her" #8 "Skit _ Billboard Music Awards Speech" #9	October 1, 2017	
3rd	Busker Busker	8 songs	"Love, At First" #1 "Too Much Regret" #2 "Love Is Timing" #3 "Your Lips" #4 "Night" #6 "Cool Girl" #7 "Beautiful Age" #8 "Autumn Night" #9	October 12, 2013	
3rd	EXO	8 songs	"Tempo" #1 "Gravity" #3 "Ooh La La La" #4 "24/7" #5 "Sign" #6 "With You" #8 "Smile On My Face" #9 "Oasis" #10	November 17, 2018	
4th	EXO	7 songs	"Universe" #1 "Been Through" #2 "Stay" #3 "Fall" #4 "Good Night" #5 "Lights Out" #6 "Universe (CD Ver.)" #7	January 6, 2018	
4th	BTS	7 songs	"Fake Love" #1 "The Truth Untold" #4 "Anpanman" #5 "Airplane pt.2" #6 "Paradise" #7 "Love Maze" #9 "134340" #10	June 9, 2018	
4th	BTS	7 songs	"Boy With Luv" (featuring Halsey) #1 "Mikrokosmos" #2 "Make It Right" #3 "Home" #4 "Jamais Vu" #5 "Dionysus" #6 "Intro: Persona" #7	April 20, 2019; April 27, 2019	
4th	IU	7 songs	"Lilac" #1 "Celebrity" #2 "Coin" #4 "Hi Spring Bye" #5 "Flu" #6 "Troll" (featuring DEAN) #9 "My Sea" #10	April 10, 2021	
4th	IU	7 songs	"Lilac" #1 "Celebrity" #3 "Coin" #4 "Hi Spring Bye" #6 "Flu" #8 "My Sea" #9 "Hold My Hand" #10	April 17, 2021	
5th	Busker Busker	6 songs	"Cherry Blossom Ending" #1 "Yeosu Night Sea" #5 "First Love" #6 "Loneliness Amplifier" #8 "Ideal Type" #9 "The Flowers" #10	April 21, 2012	
5th	Seventeen	6 songs	"Don't Wanna Cry" #1 "Habit" #2 "Swimming Fool" #3 "Crazy in Love" #4 "IF I" #5 "MY I" #6	June 4, 2017	
5th	Wanna One	6 songs	"Boomerang" #1 "I Promise You (I.P.U.)" #4 "Gold"#7 "I'll Remember" #8 "Day by Day" #9 "I Promise You (Propose Ver.)" #10	April 7, 2018	
5th	IU	6 songs	"Lilac" #1 "Celebrity" #3 "Coin" #5 "Hi Spring Bye" #8 "Hold My Hand" #9 "Flu" #10	April 24, 2021	

== Achievement by songs ==
=== Number-one debuts ===
Song	Artist	Date	Ref.
(2011–2014)
"Era of Love"	Lee Seung-gi	October 29, 2011	
"The Boys"	Girls' Generation	November 5, 2011	
"I Miss You"	Noel	November 12, 2011	
"Blue"	Big Bang	March 10, 2012	
"Cherry Blossom Ending"	Busker Busker	April 14, 2012	
"Alone"	Sistar	April 28, 2012	
"Every End of the Day"	IU	May 26, 2012	
"If You Really Love Me"	Busker Busker	July 7, 2012	
"Loving U"	Sistar	July 14, 2012	
"I Love You"	2NE1	July 21, 2012	
"Memory of the Wind"	Naul	October 6, 2012	
"Return"	Lee Seung-gi	December 8, 2012	
"Gone Not Around Any Longer"	Sistar19	February 16, 2013	
"Snow Flower"	Gummy	March 16, 2013	
"And One"	Taeyeon	March 30, 2013	
"Rose"	Lee Hi	April 13, 2013	
"Love Blossom"	K.Will	April 20, 2013	
"Gentleman"	Psy	April 27, 2013	
"Will You Be Alright?"	BEAST	June 15, 2013	
"Missing You Today"	Davichi	July 20, 2013	
"Crazy of You"	Hyolyn	September 7, 2013	
"Touch Love"	Yoon Mi-rae	September 14, 2013	
"Love, At First"	Busker Busker	October 12, 2013	
"Break Up Dinner"	San E feat Sanchez of Phantom	December 7, 2013	
"One Way Love"	Hyolyn	December 14, 2013	
"Winter Confession"	Sung Si-kyung	December 28, 2013	
"Friday"	IU	January 4, 2014	
"Wind That Blows"	MC The Max	January 18, 2014	
"Like a Star"	K.Will	January 25, 2014	
"Some Occasional Showers"	Gary featuring Crush	February 1, 2014	
"Goodbye"	Hyolyn	February 8, 2014	
"During That Meet Your"	Lee Sun-hee	April 12, 2014	
"Umbrella" (Note: The final recorded chart update published by US Billboard was the issue dated June 21, 2014. Billboard Korea published two more chart issues after that date, and was then discontinued. The final two song entries listed for 2014 are the number-one debuts per those issues.)	Younha	July 9, 2014	
"Break Up To Make Up"	Huh Gak and Jung Eun-ji	July 16, 2014	
(2017–2022)
"Heart Shaker" (Note: Billboard resumed the K-pop 100 in 2017 with the issue dated December 30, but marked all 100 songs on the ranking as "New", likely to indicate the chart's restart, rather than 100 debuts, since many of the songs listed were released and charting prior to that date. To avoid any possible confusion for readers, the Billboard Korea chart issue is used for "Heart Shaker"'s debut instead.)	Twice	December 24, 2017	
"Universe"	Exo	January 6, 2018	
"Sound of Winter"	Park Hyo-shin	January 13, 2018	
"Boomerang"	Wanna One	April 7, 2018	
"What Is Love?"	Twice	April 28, 2018	
"Dance the Night Away"	Twice	July 21, 2018	
"Soulmate"	Zico featuring IU	August 11, 2018	
"Power Up"	Red Velvet	August 18, 2018	
"Idol"	BTS	September 1, 2018	
"Lullaby"	Got7	September 29, 2018	
"Tempo"	Exo	November 10, 2018	
"Solo"	Jennie	November 24, 2018	
"Spring Breeze"	Wanna One	December 1, 2018	
"Love Shot"	Exo	December 22, 2018	
"Home"	Seventeen	February 2, 2019	
"Lovedrunk"	Epik High featuring IU	March 23, 2019	
"Four Seasons"	Taeyeon	April 6, 2019	
"Boy with Luv"	BTS featuring Halsey	April 20, 2019	
"UN Village"	Baekhyun	July 13, 2019	
"What a Life"	Exo-SC	July 27, 2019	
"Umpah Umpah"	Red Velvet	August 24, 2019	
"Feel Special"	Twice	September 28, 2019	
"Any Song"	Zico	January 18, 2020	
"Celebrity"	IU	February 6, 2021	
"Lilac"	IU	April 10, 2021	
"Butter"	BTS	June 5, 2021	
"Foolish Love"	M.O.M	July 10, 2021	
"Permission to Dance"	BTS	July 24, 2021	
"Ganadara"	Jay Park featuring IU	March 26, 2022	

=== Songs with most weeks at number one ===
Rank	Song	Artist	No. of weeks	Year	Ref.
1st	"Dynamite"	BTS	22	2020–2021	
2nd	"Merry-Go-Round"	Sokodomo featuring Zion.T and Wonstein	12	2021–2022	
3rd	"Traffic Light"	Lee Mu-jin	8	2021	
4th	"Boy with Luv"	BTS featuring Halsey	7	2019	
4th	"Celebrity"	IU	7	2021	
5th	"Return"	Lee Seung-gi	6	2012–2013	
5th	"Some"	Soyou x Junggigo	6	2014	
5th	"Love Scenario"	iKon	6	2018	
5th	"Any Song"	Zico	6	2020	
5th	"Eight"	IU featuring Suga	6	2020	
5th	"Rollin'"	Brave Girls	6	2021	

=== Songs with most weeks in Top 10 (2011–2014) ===
Rank	Song	Artist	No. of weeks	Year
1st	"Gangnam Style"	Psy	14	2012
2nd	"Some"	Soyou x Junggigo	13	2014
3rd	"Loving U"	Sistar	10	2012
3rd	"Return"	Lee Seung-gi	10	2012–2013
4th	"I Miss You"	Noel	9	2011–2012
4th	"Cry Cry"	T-ara	9	2011–2012
4th	"You & I"	IU	9	2011–2012
4th	"Trouble Maker"	Trouble Maker	9	2011–2012
4th	"Fantastic Baby"	Big Bang	9	2012
4th	"Officially Missing You, Too"	Geeks and Soyou	9	2012–2013
4th	"My Love"	Lee Seung-chul	9	2013
5th	"Don't Say Goodbye"	Ulala Session	8	2011
5th	"Be My Baby"	Wonder Girls	8	2011–2012
5th	"To Turn Back Hands of Time"	Lyn	8	2012
5th	"Alone"	Sistar	8	2012
5th	"My Love"	Lee Jong-hyun	8	2012
5th	"Turtle"	Davichi	8	2013
5th	"What's Your Name?"	4Minute	8	2013
5th	"Touch Love"	Yoon Mi-rae	8	2013

== Year-end charts ==
Rank	Song	Artist
2012
1st	"Gangnam Style"	Psy
2nd	"To Turn Back Hands of Time"	Lyn
3rd	"Loving U"	Sistar
4th	"Lovey-Dovey"	T-ara
5th	"Alone"	Sistar
6th	"My Love"	Lee Jong-hyun
7th	"Cherry Blossom Ending"	Busker Busker
8th	"All for You"	Seo In-guk and Jung Eun-ji
9th	"Fantastic Baby"	Big Bang
10th	"I Love You"	2NE1
2013
1st	"Gone Not Around Any Longer"	Sistar19
2nd	"Bounce"	Cho Yong Pil
3rd	"My Love"	Lee Seung Chul
4th	"Shower Of Tears"	Baechigi featuring Ailee
5th	"Turtle"	Davichi
6th	"What's Your Name?"	4minute
7th	"Bom Bom Bom"	Roy Kim
8th	"Give It To Me"	Sistar
9th	"Bar Bar Bar"	Crayon Pop
10th	"Monodrama"	Huh Gak with Yoo Seung-woo
