= What a Life (Exo-SC song) =

Single by Exo-SC

from the EP What a Life
- Language: Korean
- Released: July 22, 2019
- Recorded: 2019
- Genre: Hip hop
- Length: 3:23
- Label: SM; Dreamus
- Composers: Gaeko; Devine-Channel; Aris Maggiani
- Lyricists: Gaeko; Loey; Sehun
- Producers: Devine-Channel; Aris Maggiani

Exo-SC singles chronology
| "What a Life" (2019) | "Just Us 2" (2019) |

Music video
- "What a Life" on YouTube

"What a Life" is a song recorded by South Korean hip hop duo Exo-SC, the second official sub-unit of the South Korean-Chinese boy group Exo. It was released on July 22, 2019, by SM Entertainment as one of the three title tracks of their debut extended play What a Life. The song resulted in Exo-SC first music show win on KBS's Music Bank on August 2, 2019.

== Background and release ==
"What a Life" is described as a hip hop track with a unique pluck sound and an addictive chorus, and the lyrics contains a pleasant message of "Let's all work and play happily".

On July 31, a cam video of the two members separately of their performance of "What a Life" on their showcase were released.

== Music video ==
On July 18, a teaser of "What a Life" was released along with the other two title tracks of What a Life EP. On July 21, "What a Life" music video teaser was released. On July 22, the official music video of "What a Life" was released.

== Live performance ==
Exo-SC performed "What a Life" for the first time on Exo's 5th concert EXO Planet #5 - EXplOration on July 19, and will continue to do so for all the concerts in the tour.

On July 22, EXO-SC performed "What a Life" at their two showcases for the press and for the fans.

== Credits and personnel ==
Credits adapted from the EP's liner notes.

Studio

- SM Big Shot Studio – recording
- Doobdoob Studio – digital editing
- SM LVYIN Studio – engineered for mix
- SM Blue Cup Studio – mixing
- 821 Sound – mastering

Personnel

- SM Entertainment – executive producer
- Lee Soo-man – producer
- Lee Sung-soo – production director
- Kim Young-min – executive supervisor
- Yoo Young-jin – music and sound supervisor
- Exo-SC – vocals
  - Loey – lyrics
  - Sehun – lyrics
- Gaeko – lyrics, composition, vocal directing, background vocals
- Devine-Channel – producer, composition, arrangement
  - Lim Kwang-wook – bass, synthesizer
- Aris Maggiani – producer, composition, arrangement, bass, synthesizer
- Ryan Kim – electric piano
- Lee Min-kyu – recording
- Jang Woo-young – digital editing
- Lee Ji-hong – engineered for mix
- Jung Eui-seok – mixing
- Kwon Nam-woo – mastering

== Charts ==
| Chart (2019) | Peak position |
|---|---|
| South Korea (Circle) | 83 |
| South Korea (K-pop Hot 100) | 1 |

== Accolades ==
Year-end lists
| Critic/Publication | List | Rank | Ref. |
|---|---|---|---|
| PopCrush | Best Songs Of 2019 | 24 | |
| Refinery29 | The Best K-Pop Songs Of 2019 | 29 | |

=== Music program awards ===
Music program awards
| Program | Network | Date | Ref. |
|---|---|---|---|
| Music Bank | KBS | August 2, 2019 | |

== Release history ==
| Region | Date | Format | Label |
|---|---|---|---|
| South Korea | July 22, 2019 | Digital download; streaming | SM Entertainment; Dreamus |
| Various | July 22, 2019 | Digital download; streaming | SM Entertainment |
