= Tempo (Exo song) =

2018 single by Exo

Single by Exo

from the album Don't Mess Up My Tempo
- Language: Korean; Mandarin
- Released: November 2, 2018
- Recorded: 2018
- Studio: In Grid (Seoul); The Vibe (Seoul)
- Genre: R&B; hip hop; funk; dance
- Length: 3:44
- Label: SM; iriver
- Composers: MZMC; Jamil "Digi" Chammas; Leven Kali; Jeremy "Tay" Jasper; Adrian McKinnon
- Lyricists: Penomeco, JQ, Yoo Young-jin (Korean); Arys Chien (Chinese)
- Producers: Jamil "Digi" Chammas; Leven Kali

Exo singles chronology
"Electric Kiss" (2018)	"Tempo" (2018)	"Love Shot" (2018)

Music video
- "Tempo (Korean ver.)" on YouTube "Tempo (Chinese ver.)" on YouTube

"Tempo" is a song by South Korean–Chinese boy band Exo, released on November 2, 2018, as the lead single of the band's fifth studio album Don't Mess Up My Tempo. The music video was released on the same date. The Chinese version features member Lay, who has been on an extended hiatus since "For Life" in 2016.

== Background ==
"Tempo" was called "a rhythmical hip-hop-leaning dance track that showcases a cappella harmonies as they send warnings not to 'mess up his tempo' with their lover". Billboard stated the preview "starts off with a dramatic synth melody, pulsating beat and the phrase 'I can't believe'." On February 24, 2019, the Korean music video surpassed 100 million views on YouTube. Exo promoted the album and song with teasers throughout October 2018, including a 30-second Tempo Concept short film, showing the band as a biker gang, which was a preview of "Tempo".

== Reception ==
Year-end lists
Critic/Publication	List	Rank	Ref.
Dazed	The 20 Best K-Pop Songs of 2018	7	
Billboard	The 20 Best K-Pop Songs of 2018	18	
SBS PopAsia	Top 100 Asian pop songs of 2018	21	
BuzzFeed	30 Songs That Helped Define K-Pop In 2018	12	
The Young Folks	The 20 Best K-Pop Singles of 2018	17	
Refinery29	Best K-pop Music Video Moments of 2018	16	

== Accolades ==
Awards and nominations
Year	Organization	Award	Result	Ref.
2019	Gaon Chart Music Awards	Song of the Year – November	Nominated	
2019	Soompi Awards	Song of the Year	Won	
2019	MTV Video Music Awards	Best K-pop Video	Nominated	
2019	Mnet Asian Music Awards	Best Dance Performance – Male Group	Nominated	
2019	Mnet Asian Music Awards	Song of the Year	Nominated	

Music program awards
Program	Date
Music Bank	November 9, 2018
Music Bank	November 16, 2018
Music Bank	January 4, 2019

== Credits and personnel ==
Credits adapted from the album's liner notes.

=== Studio ===
- In Grid Studio – recording
- The Vibe Studio – recording
- doobdoob Studio – digital editing
- SM Big Shot Studio – engineered for mix
- SM Blue Cup Studio – mixing
- Sterling Sound – mastering

=== Personnel ===
- SM Entertainment – executive producer
- Lee Soo-man – producer
- Exo – vocals, background vocals
- Penomeco – Korean lyrics
- JQ – Korean lyrics
- Yoo Young-jin – Korean lyrics, music and sound supervisor
- Arys Chien – Chinese lyrics
- Jamil "Digi" Chammas – producer, composition, arrangement
- Leven Kali – producer, composition, background vocals
- MZMC – composition
- Adrian McKinnon – composition, background vocals
- Jeremy "Tay" Jasper – composition
- Deez – vocal directing
- Onestar – vocal directing
- Andrew Choi – background vocals
- Jeong Eun-kyung – recording
- Kwak Jeong-shin – recording
- Jeong Mo-yeon – recording
- Jang Woo-young – digital editing
- Lee Min-gyu – engineered for mix
- Jung Eui-seok – mixing
- Chris Gehringer – mastering

== Charts ==
=== Weekly charts ===
Chart (2018)	Peak position
France Download (SNEP)	182
Japan Hot 100 (Billboard)	26
Malaysia (RIM)	2
New Zealand Hot Singles (RMNZ)	25
Singapore (RIAS)	11
South Korea (Gaon)	4
South Korea (K-pop Hot 100)	1
UK Indie (Official Charts)	27
US World Digital Songs (Billboard)	2

=== Year-end charts ===
Chart (2019)	Position
South Korea (Gaon)	101

== Sales ==
Downloads
Region	Sales
China (digital)	2,292
Japan (digital)	6,627

== Release history ==
Release history for "Tempo"
Region	Date	Format	Label
South Korea	November 2, 2018	Digital download; streaming	SM; iRiver
Various	November 2, 2018	Digital download; streaming	SM
