= Dreamus =

South Korean electronics and entertainment company

Dreamus Company
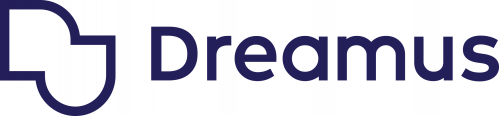
- Native name: (주)드림어스컴퍼니
- Formerly: ReignCom iRiver
- Type: Public
- Traded as: KRX: 060570
- Industry: Consumer electronics Music
- Founded: January 20, 1999; 27 years ago
- Founder: Yang Duk-jun and six others
- Headquarters: iRiver House, 5 Bangbae-ro 18-gil, Bangbae-dong, Seocho-gu, Seoul, South Korea
- Area served: Worldwide
- Key people: Lee Ki-young (CEO)
- Revenue: ▼ ₩225 billion (US$196.69 million) (2025)
- Operating income: ▲ ₩593 million (US$518,379.3) (2025)
- Net income: ▲ ₩2.6 billion (US$2.27 million) (2025)
- Total assets: ▼ ₩162 billion (US$141.61 million) (2025)
- Owners: As of June 2026: bemyfriends (31.35%); SK Square (22.17%); SM Entertainment (8.133%); Shinhan Venture Investment, through Neospes LLC (6.115%); Others (32.232%)
- Parent: N/A (Independent) (until 2014); SK Square (SK Telecom) (2014-2025) bemyfriends (since 2025)
- Divisions: iRiver Limited; iRiver China Limited
- Subsidiaries: Astell & Kern; Yurion; Funcake Entertainment Services
- Website: www.dreamuscompany.com

Dreamus is an electronics and entertainment company founded in 1999 originally as ReignCom. Currently headquartered in South Korea (and formerly in the United States), it is the parent company of South Korean-based iRiver, Astell & Kern and FLO, as well as Yurion and Funcake Entertainment Services. Formerly a subsidiary of SK Telecom when it was formerly known as iRiver, it is currently an affiliated subsidiary of bemyfriends, the operator of fandom platform b.stage.

== History ==
Seven former Samsung executives created the company in 1999 and made its IPO on the KOSDAQ, a Korean stock exchange, in 2003. Duk-Jun Yang, one of the founders, became the CEO of the company.

ReignCom announced in May 2006 that it would adjust its focus toward handheld mobile gaming. It has reported sluggish sales for its music player business, including a loss of 35.58 billion (US$36.68 million) in 2005, compared with a net profit of 43.46 billion in 2004.

In 2009, ReignCom was renamed as iRiver.

In August 2014, SK Telecom acquired iRiver for 30 billion won.

=== Entry into music ===
In January 2015, music streaming platform Music Mate was launched.

On July 17, 2017 SM Entertainment acquired a stake in iRiver and became the second largest shareholder.

On January 31, 2018, it was announced that, parent company SK Telecom along with entertainment agencies SM Entertainment, JYP Entertainment, and Hybe Corporation (formerly known as Bighit Entertainment) would collaborate and launch a B2B music distribution and a B2C music service platform. As part of this agreement, beginning from February 1, iRiver would distribute JYP and Big Hit’s album and digital music contents. HYBE would later go on to strike a distribution deal with YG Plus in January 27, 2021 hence no longer partnering with Dreamus.

On December 11, 2018 it was announced that the company will update and rename the existing music streaming service 'Music Mate' to the new music platform 'FLO'.

On March 28, 2019, iRiver announced that they would rename to Dreamus Company.

On November 18, 2021 Dreamus partnered with entertainment agency RBW and FLO and signed an exclusive performance partnership contract, with this Dreamus owns a 2.04% stake in RBW.

On November 29, 2021 SK Telecom, originally Dreamus' parent company, created and spun off SK Square, with Dreamus becoming a subsidiary of SK Square.

== Distributed labels ==
=== Current ===
South Korea

As of 2024:

- Company Soosoo
- INB100
- ODE Entertainment
- SM Entertainment (co-distributed with Kakao Entertainment)
  - Label SJ (co-distributed with Kakao Entertainment)
  - Million Market (co-distributed with Kakao Entertainment)
  - Mystic Story (select releases only; co-distributed with Kakao Entertainment)
  - Woollim Entertainment (select releases only; co-distributed with Kakao Entertainment)
- JYP Entertainment
  - Studio J
  - SQU4D
- P Nation (co-distributed with Kakao Entertainment, Genie Music, Stone Music Entertainment and Warner Music Korea)
- Modhaus
- NUPLAY
- Blue Vinyl
- Biscuit Entertainment
- IOK Music
- 131 Label
- Moss Music
- ASND

International

- Avex Inc. (Note: By way of licensing through SM Entertainment.)
- Johnny & Associates
  - J Storm
- SM Entertainment
  - Label V

=== Former ===
- Hybe Corporation (Note: Except Belift Lab, which is distributed by Genie Music and Stone Music Entertainment) (2018-2021, moved to YG Plus)
  - Big Hit Music
  - Pledis Entertainment
