= List of awards and nominations received by Exo =

Exo awards and nominations
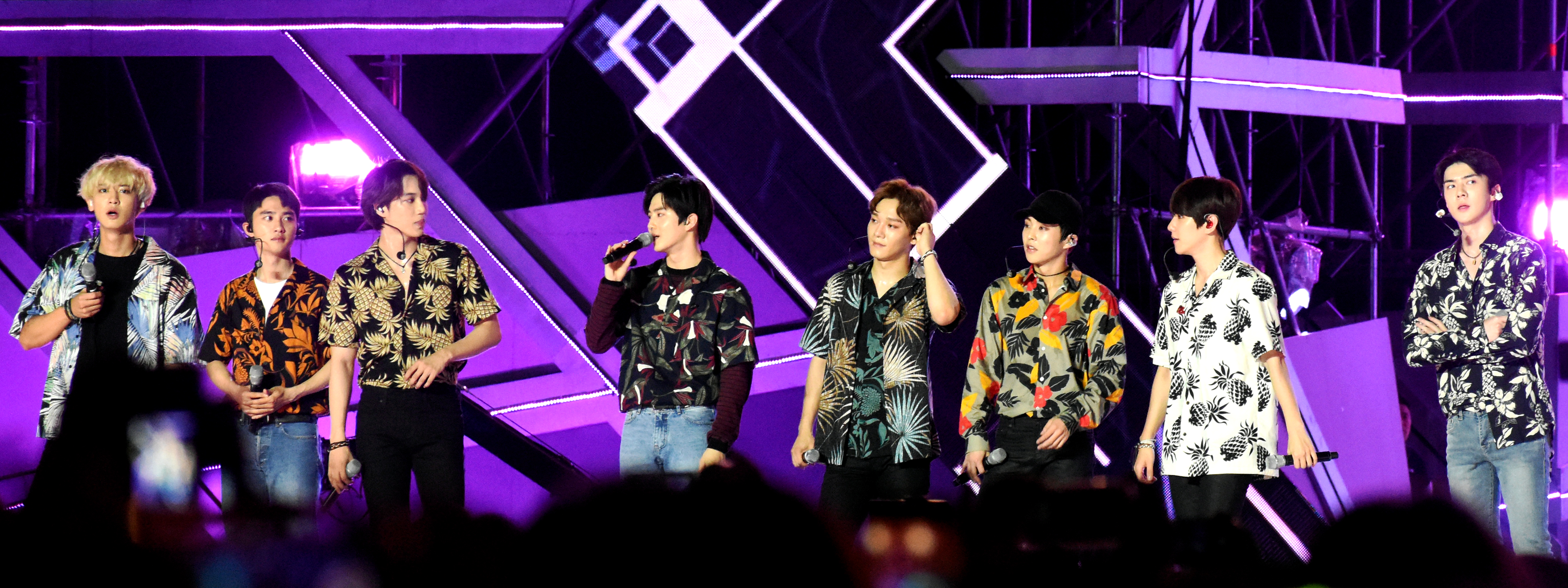
- Exo at the Incheon Airport Sky Festival in 2018
Awards and nominations
Award	Wins	Nominations
American Music Awards	0	2
Anugerah Bintang Popular Berita Harian	0	1
Asia Artist Awards	8	9
Asian Idol Awards	1	1
Asian Pop Music Awards	6	13
Baidu Music Awards	1	1
Billboard Music Awards	0	2
Billboard Music Festival	1	1
Bravo Otto	0	1
Chinese Music Awards	1	1
EDaily Culture Awards	1	1
Elle Style Awards	1	1
Gaon Chart Music Awards	16	30
Genie Music Awards	0	2
Global Fan Awards	1	1
Golden Disc Awards	18	31
Hanteo Music Awards	1	1
Hawaii International Music Awards Festival	1	1
Hito Music Awards	1	1
Huading Awards	1	1
iF Design Awards	3	3
iHeartRadio Music Awards	0	1
iQiyi All-Star Carnival	3	3
Japan Gold Disc Awards	2	2
Joox Indonesia Music Awards	0	1
Joox Thailand Music Awards	0	5
Kazz Awards	0	1
KBS Song Festival	1	1
Korea Best Star Awards	1	1
Korea Popular Music Awards	1	3
Korean Broadcasting Awards	1	1
Korean Entertainment Arts Awards	2	2
Korean Music Awards	2	3
Korean Producers Awards	1	1
K-pop Lovers Awards	2	2
MAMA Awards	16	47
MBC Entertainment Awards	2	2
Melon Music Awards	17	36
Mengniu Billboard Music Festival	4	4
Meus Prêmios Nick	0	1
Miguhui Awards	2	2
MTV Europe Music Awards	1	2
MTV Millennial Awards	0	4
MTV Millennial Awards Brazil	0	2
MTV Video Music Award	0	2
Myx Music Awards	1	2
Philippine K-pop Awards	7	7
Red Dot Awards	2	2
SBS Awards Festival	3	3
Seoul Music Awards	24	39
Soribada Best K-Music Awards	4	7
Teen Choice Awards	0	4
Tencent Music Entertainment Awards	1	1
Top Chinese Music Awards	4	6
V Chart Awards	6	6
V Live Awards	4	7
World Music Awards	2	2
Youku Night	2	2

Totals (Note: Certain award groups do not simply award one winner. They acknowledge several different recipients, have runners-up, and have third place. Since this is a specific recognition and is different from losing an award, runner-up mentions are considered wins in this award tally. For simplification and to avoid errors, each award in this list has been presumed to have had a prior nomination.)
- Wins: 180
- Nominations: 322

Exo is a South Korean–Chinese boy band from Seoul, South Korea, formed in 2011. The band consists of nine members: Xiumin, Suho, Lay Zhang, Baekhyun, Chen, Chanyeol, D.O., Kai, and Sehun. As of July 2023, they have released eight studio albums and seven extended plays (EP) in Korean, Mandarin, and Japanese. Exo achieved success with the release of their debut EP Mama in 2012. It won them many awards and nominations, including Best New Asian Artist and a nomination for Artist of the Year at the 2012 Mnet Asian Music Awards. They were also nominated for Rookie of the Year at the 2013 Korean Music Awards and won the New Artist Award at the 2013 Seoul Music Awards.

Exo's first studio album XOXO was released in June 2013 and received various awards, including their first Daesang award. In South Korea's music industry, a Daesang award is the "grand prize" of an award ceremony. The album won Album of the Year at the 2013 Mnet Asian Music Awards and Disc Daesang at the 2014 Golden Disc Awards. "Growl", a single on the album, won Song of the Year at the 2013 Melon Music Awards. Exo have continued receiving awards and nominations in the years since, and as of January 2019, they have accumulated 23 Daesang awards from various award shows. These include several sets of consecutive wins for the same award: five consecutive Album of the Year wins at the Mnet Asian Music Awards, four consecutive Disc Daesang wins at the Golden Disc Awards, four consecutive Daesang wins at the Seoul Music Awards, and two consecutive Artist of the Year wins at the Melon Music Awards.

Exo have won over 100 music program awards, which are awarded on weekly television shows in South Korea and China to the artist with the most popular and best performing song in the country that week. In 2017, Exo received a Prime Minister's Commendation award at the Korean Popular Culture & Arts Awards, which was given in recognition of public service or excellence in their field. With five wins at the time, Exo earned an entry in the 2018 Guinness World Records book for the "Most Daesang ("Grand Prize") awards won at the Mnet Asian Music Awards". Exo were also named by Forbes on their Korea Power Celebrity list as the most powerful celebrities in South Korea for 2015 and 2016, and within the top five for 2014, 2017 and 2018. Overall, Exo has received 180 awards from 324 nominations.

== Awards and nominations ==
Name of the award ceremony, year presented, nominee(s) of the award, award category, and the result of the nomination
Award ceremony	Year	Nominee/work	Category	Result	Ref.
American Music Awards	2019	Exo	Favorite Social Artist	Nominated	
American Music Awards	2020	Exo	Favorite Social Artist	Nominated	
Anugerah Bintang Popular Berita Harian	2019	Exo	Popular Korean Artist	Nominated	
Asia Artist Awards	2016	Exo	Asia Star Award	Won	
Asia Artist Awards	2016	Exo	Popularity Award – Music	Won	
Asia Artist Awards	2016	Exo	Baidu Star Award	Won	
Asia Artist Awards	2016	Exo	Daesang Award – Music	Won	
Asia Artist Awards	2017	Exo	Popularity Award – Music	Won	
Asia Artist Awards	2017	Exo	Fabulous Award	Won	
Asia Artist Awards	2017	Exo	Daesang Award – Music	Won	
Asia Artist Awards	2018	Exo	Popularity Award – Music	Nominated	
Asia Artist Awards	2021	Exo	Popularity Award – Idol Group (Male)	Won	
Asian Idol Awards (Note: The Asian Idol Awards are an annual music awards show established in 2012 and presented by Anhui Satellite TV in China that honors artists for outstanding performances.)	2013	Exo	Popular Asian Group	Won	
Asian Pop Music Awards	2020	Exo	Best Group	Won	
Asian Pop Music Awards	2020	Obsession	Best Album (Overseas)	Nominated	
Asian Pop Music Awards	2020	"Obsession"	Song of the Year (Overseas)	Nominated	
Asian Pop Music Awards	2020	"Obsession"	Best Music Video (Overseas)	Nominated	
Asian Pop Music Awards	2021	Don't Fight the Feeling	Record of the Year (Overseas)	Nominated	
Asian Pop Music Awards	2021	Don't Fight the Feeling	People's Choice Award (Overseas)	Won	
Asian Pop Music Awards	2021	Exo	Best Group (Overseas)	Nominated	
Asian Pop Music Awards	2021	"Don't Fight the Feeling"	Top 20 Songs of the Year (Overseas)	Won	
Asian Pop Music Awards	2023	"Let Me In"	Best Music Video (Overseas)	Won	
Asian Pop Music Awards	2023	Exist	People's Choice Award (Overseas)	Won	
Asian Pop Music Awards	2023	Exist	Top 20 Albums of the Year (Overseas)	Won	
Asian Pop Music Awards	2023	Exist	Best Album (Overseas)	Nominated	
Asian Pop Music Awards	2023	Exist	Best Group (Overseas)	Nominated	
Baidu Music Awards (Note: Established in 2012, the Baidu Music Awards are an annual entertainment awards show hosted by Baidu, the largest web portal site in China.)	2013	Exo	Most Popular Group	Won	
Billboard Music Awards	2019	Exo	Top Social Artist	Nominated	
Billboard Music Awards	2020	Exo	Top Social Artist	Nominated	
Billboard Music Festival (Note: The Billboard Music Festival is an annual music festival established in 2001 and held in China.)	2013	Exo-M	Most Popular Group	Won	
Bravo Otto	2019	Exo	Best K-pop	Nominated	
Chinese Music Awards	2014	Exo	Asia's Most Influential Group	Won	
EDaily Culture Awards (Note: Established in 2013, the EDdaily Culture Awards are an annual awards show held in Seoul, South Korea.)	2017	Exo Planet 3 – The Exo'rdium	Top Excellence Award – Concert	Won	
Elle Style Awards (Note: Held in South Korea for the first time in 2017, the Elle Style Awards are an annual awards show that honors fashion, culture and art.)	2017	Exo	Super K-Pop Group Award	Won	
Gaon Chart Music Awards	2014	Exo	Popularity Award	Won	
Gaon Chart Music Awards	2014	XOXO	Album of the Year – 3rd Quarter	Won	
Gaon Chart Music Awards	2014	Miracles in December	Album of the Year – 4th Quarter	Won	
Gaon Chart Music Awards	2015	Exo	Popularity Award	Won	
Gaon Chart Music Awards	2015	Overdose	Album of the Year – 2nd Quarter	Won	
Gaon Chart Music Awards	2016	Exo	Popularity Award	Won	
Gaon Chart Music Awards	2016	Exodus	Album of the Year – 1st Quarter	Won	
Gaon Chart Music Awards	2016	Love Me Right	Album of the Year – 2nd Quarter	Won	
Gaon Chart Music Awards	2016	Sing For You	Album of the Year – 4th Quarter	Won	
Gaon Chart Music Awards	2017	Exo	Popularity Award	Won	
Gaon Chart Music Awards	2017	Ex'Act (Korean Ver.)	Album of the Year – 2nd Quarter	Won	
Gaon Chart Music Awards	2017	Ex'Act (Mandarin Ver.)	Album of the Year – 2nd Quarter	Nominated	
Gaon Chart Music Awards	2017	Lotto (Korean Ver.)	Album of the Year – 3rd Quarter	Won	
Gaon Chart Music Awards	2017	Lotto (Mandarin Ver.)	Album of the Year – 3rd Quarter	Nominated	
Gaon Chart Music Awards	2017	For Life	Album of the Year – 4th Quarter	Nominated	
Gaon Chart Music Awards	2017	"Monster"	Song of the Year – June	Nominated	
Gaon Chart Music Awards	2017	"Dancing King" with Yoo Jaesuk	Song of the Year – September	Nominated	
Gaon Chart Music Awards	2018	Exo	Popularity Award	Nominated	
Gaon Chart Music Awards	2018	The War (Korean Ver.)	Album of the Year – 3rd Quarter	Nominated	
Gaon Chart Music Awards	2018	The War: The Power of Music (Korean Ver.)	Album of the Year – 3rd Quarter	Nominated	
Gaon Chart Music Awards	2018	Universe	Album of the Year – 4th Quarter	Nominated	
Gaon Chart Music Awards	2018	"Ko Ko Bop"	Song of the Year – July	Won	
Gaon Chart Music Awards	2018	"Universe"	Song of the Year – December	Nominated	
Gaon Chart Music Awards	2019	"Tempo"	Song of the Year – November	Nominated	
Gaon Chart Music Awards	2019	Don't Mess Up My Tempo	Album of the Year – 4th Quarter	Won	
Gaon Chart Music Awards	2019	Love Shot	Album of the Year – 4th Quarter	Nominated	
Gaon Chart Music Awards	2020	"Love Shot"	Song of the Year – December 2018	Nominated	
Gaon Chart Music Awards	2020	Obsession	Album of the Year – 4th Quarter	Won	
Gaon Chart Music Awards	2020	Exo	Top Kit Seller of the Year	Won	
Gaon Chart Music Awards	2022	Don't Fight the Feeling	Album of the Year – 3rd Quarter	Nominated	
Genie Music Awards	2019	Exo	Male Group	Nominated	
Genie Music Awards	2019	Exo	Male Performing Artist	Nominated	
Global Fan Awards (Note: The Global Fan Awards are annual online fan-voted awards in South Korea and China.)	2018	Exo	Fandom Award	Won	
Golden Disc Awards	2013	Exo-K	Newcomer Award	Won	
Golden Disc Awards	2014	Exo	Popularity Award	Nominated	
Golden Disc Awards	2014	"Growl"	Digital Bonsang	Nominated	
Golden Disc Awards	2014	XOXO	Disc Bonsang	Won	
Golden Disc Awards	2014	XOXO	Disc Daesang	Won	
Golden Disc Awards	2015	Overdose	Disc Bonsang	Won	
Golden Disc Awards	2015	Overdose	Disc Daesang	Won	
Golden Disc Awards	2015	Overdose	Digital Bonsang	Nominated	
Golden Disc Awards	2016	Exo	Global Popularity Award	Won	
Golden Disc Awards	2016	Exodus	Disc Bonsang	Won	
Golden Disc Awards	2016	Exodus	Disc Daesang	Won	
Golden Disc Awards	2016	"Call Me Baby"	Digital Bonsang	Nominated	
Golden Disc Awards	2017	Exo	Ceci Asia Icon Award	Won	
Golden Disc Awards	2017	Ex'Act	Disc Bonsang	Won	
Golden Disc Awards	2017	Ex'Act	Disc Daesang	Won	
Golden Disc Awards	2017	"Monster"	Digital Bonsang	Nominated	
Golden Disc Awards	2018	Exo	Genie Popularity Award	Won	
Golden Disc Awards	2018	Exo	Global Popularity Award	Won	
Golden Disc Awards	2018	Exo	Ceci Asia Icon Award	Won	
Golden Disc Awards	2018	The War	Disc Bonsang	Won	
Golden Disc Awards	2018	The War	Disc Daesang	Nominated	
Golden Disc Awards	2019	Don't Mess Up My Tempo	Disc Bonsang	Won	
Golden Disc Awards	2019	Don't Mess Up My Tempo	Disc Daesang	Nominated	
Golden Disc Awards	2019	"Universe"	Digital Bonsang	Nominated	
Golden Disc Awards	2019	Exo	Most Popular Artist	Nominated	
Golden Disc Awards	2020	"Love Shot"	Digital Bonsang	Nominated	
Golden Disc Awards	2020	Exo	TikTok Golden Disc Popularity Award	Nominated	
Golden Disc Awards	2021	Obsession	Disc Bonsang	Won	
Golden Disc Awards	2021	Obsession	Disc Daesang	Nominated	
Golden Disc Awards	2021	Exo	QQ Music Fans Choice K-Pop Artist	Won	
Golden Disc Awards	2024	Exist	Best Album Division	Nominated	
Hanteo Music Awards	2021	Exo	Initial Chodong Record Award	Won	
Hawaii International Music Awards Festival (Note: Established in 2013, the Hawaii International Music Awards Festival is hosted by the Hawaiian Government's Tourism Administration, to bring different cultures together through music.)	2013	Exo	Artist of the Year	Won	
Hito Music Awards	2014	"Growl"	Best J-pop & K-pop Song	Won	
Huading Awards	2015	Exo	Best International Group Award	Won	
iF Design Awards	2014	XOXO	Best Packaging Design	Won	
iF Design Awards	2014	Exo	Brand Identity Design	Won	
iF Design Awards	2016	Miracles in December	Best Packaging Design	Won	
iHeartRadio Music Awards	2018	Exo	Best Fan Army	Nominated	
iQiyi All-Star Carnival (Note: The iQiyi All-Star Carnival is an annual awards show hosted by iQiyi, the largest online video sharing website in China.)	2016	Exo	Asian Popularity Award	Won	
iQiyi All-Star Carnival	2016	"Call Me Baby"	Music of the Year Award	Won	
iQiyi All-Star Carnival	2017	Exo	Most Popular Asian Group	Won	
Japan Gold Disc Awards	2016	Exo	New Artist of the Year (Asian)	Won	
Japan Gold Disc Awards	2016	Exo	Best 3 New Artists	Won	
Joox Indonesia Music Awards	2021	Exo	Korean Artist of the Year	Nominated	
Joox Thailand Music Awards	2018	Exo	K-Pop Artist of the Year	Nominated	
Joox Thailand Music Awards	2019	Exo	K-Pop Artist of the Year	Nominated	
Joox Thailand Music Awards	2020	Exo	K-Pop Artist of the Year	Nominated	
Joox Thailand Music Awards	2021	Exo	Top Social Artist of the Year	Nominated	
Joox Thailand Music Awards	2022	Exo	Top Social Global Artist of the Year	Nominated	
Kazz Awards (Note: Established in 2007 and presented by Kazz Magazine, the Kazz Awards are an annual entertainment awards show held in Thailand.)	2017	Exo Planet 3 – The Exo'rdium	Best Asian Concert	Nominated	
KBS Song Festival	2013	"Growl"	Song of the Year	Won	
Korea Best Star Awards (Note: The Korea Best Star Awards are an annual entertainment awards show established in 2012 and hosted by the Korean Film Actor's Association.)	2018	Exo	Korea Top Singer Award	Won	
Korea Popular Music Awards (Note: The Korea Popular Music Awards are a music awards show that began in 2018 and is sponsored by the Korea Singers Association, the Korea Entertainment Producer's Association, the Recording Industry Association of Korea, the Federation of Korean Music Performers, and the Korea Music Copyright Association.)	2018	Exo	Best Artist	Nominated	
Korea Popular Music Awards	2018	Exo	Best Song	Nominated	
Korea Popular Music Awards	2018	Exo	Popularity Award	Won	
Korean Broadcasting Awards (Note: The Korean Broadcasting Awards were established in 1973 and held annually by the Korean Broadcasting Association.)	2015	Exo	Artist Award	Won	
Korean Entertainment Arts Awards (Note: Established in 1995, the Korean Entertainment Arts Awards are an annual awards show held in South Korea.)	2012	Exo-K	Rookie Singer	Won	
Korean Entertainment Arts Awards	2014	Exo	Best Group	Won	
Korean Music Awards	2014	Exo	Group Musician of the Year by Netizen Vote	Won	
Korean Music Awards	2014	"Growl"	Song of the Year	Nominated	
Korean Music Awards	2014	"Growl"	Best Dance & Electronic Song	Won	
Korean Producers Awards (Note: The Korean Producers Awards are an annual entertainment awards show established in 1989 and presented by the Producers Association of Korea.)	2014	Exo	Singer Award	Won	
K-pop Lovers Awards (Note: The K-pop Lovers Awards are annual awards presented by Tower Records, Japan, honoring artists for music record sales.)	2012	Exo	Best Rookie of the Year (First-Half)	Won	
K-pop Lovers Awards	2012	Exo	Best Rookie of 2012	Won	
MAMA Awards	2012	Exo-K	Best New Male Artist	Nominated	
MAMA Awards	2012	Exo	Best New Asian Artist	Won	
MAMA Awards	2013	"Growl"	Best Dance Performance Male Group	Nominated	
MAMA Awards	2013	Exo	Best Male Group	Nominated	
MAMA Awards	2013	Exo	Artist of the Year	Nominated	
MAMA Awards	2013	XOXO	Album of the Year	Won	
MAMA Awards	2014	Exo	Best Asian Style Award	Won	
MAMA Awards	2014	"Overdose"	Best Dance Performance Male Group	Nominated	
MAMA Awards	2014	Exo	Best Male Group	Won	
MAMA Awards	2014	Exo	Artist of the Year	Won	
MAMA Awards	2014	"Overdose"	Song of the Year	Nominated	
MAMA Awards	2014	Overdose	Album of the Year	Won	
MAMA Awards	2015	Exo	Best Male Group	Won	
MAMA Awards	2015	"Call Me Baby"	Best Dance Performance Male Group	Nominated	
MAMA Awards	2015	Exo	Global Fan's Choice Male Group	Won	
MAMA Awards	2015	Exo	Best Asian Style Award	Won	
MAMA Awards	2015	Exo	Artist of the Year	Nominated	
MAMA Awards	2015	"Call Me Baby"	Song of the Year	Nominated	
MAMA Awards	2015	Exodus	Album of the Year	Won	
MAMA Awards	2016	Exo	Best Male Group	Won	
MAMA Awards	2016	"Monster"	Best Dance Performance Male Group	Nominated	
MAMA Awards	2016	Exo	Best Asian Style Award	Won	
MAMA Awards	2016	Exo	Artist of the Year	Nominated	
MAMA Awards	2016	Ex'Act	Album of the Year	Won	
MAMA Awards	2016	"Monster"	Song of the Year	Nominated	
MAMA Awards	2017	Exo	Best Male Group	Nominated	
MAMA Awards	2017	Exo	Favorite KPOP Star	Nominated	
MAMA Awards	2017	Exo	Artist of the Year	Nominated	
MAMA Awards	2017	"Ko Ko Bop"	Best Dance Performance Male Group	Nominated	
MAMA Awards	2017	"Ko Ko Bop"	Global Fans' Choice	Won	
MAMA Awards	2017	"Ko Ko Bop"	Song of the Year	Nominated	
MAMA Awards	2017	"Power"	Best Music Video	Nominated	
MAMA Awards	2017	The War	Album of the Year	Won	
MAMA Awards	2019	Exo	Artist of the Year	Nominated	
MAMA Awards	2019	Exo	Worldwide Fans' Choice Top 10	Won	
MAMA Awards	2019	Exo	Best Male Group	Nominated	
MAMA Awards	2019	"Tempo"	Best Dance Performance – Male Group	Nominated	
MAMA Awards	2019	"Tempo"	Song of the Year	Nominated	
MAMA Awards	2019	Don't Mess Up My Tempo	Album of the Year	Nominated	
MAMA Awards	2020	Exo	Artist of the Year	Nominated	
MAMA Awards	2020	Exo	Worldwide Fans' Choice Top 10	Nominated	
MAMA Awards	2020	Exo	Best Male Group	Nominated	
MAMA Awards	2020	"Obsession"	Best Dance Performance – Male Group	Nominated	
MAMA Awards	2023	Exo	Best Male Group	Nominated	
MAMA Awards	2023	Exo	Worldwide Fans' Choice Top 10	Nominated	
MAMA Awards	2023	Exo	Artist of the Year	Longlisted	
MAMA Awards	2023	Exist	Album of the Year	Longlisted	
MBC Entertainment Awards	2014	Exo	Popularity Award	Won	
MBC Entertainment Awards	2015	Exo	Popularity Award	Won	
Melon Music Awards	2013	Exo	Global Star Award	Nominated	
Melon Music Awards	2013	Exo	Artist of the Year	Nominated	
Melon Music Awards	2013	Exo	Netizen Popularity Award	Won	
Melon Music Awards	2013	Exo	Top 10 Artists	Won	
Melon Music Awards	2013	XOXO	Album of the Year	Nominated	
Melon Music Awards	2013	"Growl"	Song of the Year	Won	
Melon Music Awards	2013	"Growl"	Music Video Award	Nominated	
Melon Music Awards	2014	Exo	Top 10 Artists	Won	
Melon Music Awards	2014	Exo	Netizen Popularity Award	Nominated	
Melon Music Awards	2015	Exo	Artist of the Year	Nominated	
Melon Music Awards	2015	Exo	Top 10 Artists	Won	
Melon Music Awards	2015	Exo	Netizen Popularity Award	Nominated	
Melon Music Awards	2015	Exodus	Album of the Year	Won	
Melon Music Awards	2015	"Call Me Baby"	Song of the Year	Nominated	
Melon Music Awards	2016	Exo	Artist of the Year	Won	
Melon Music Awards	2016	Exo	Top 10 Artists	Won	
Melon Music Awards	2016	Exo	Netizen Popularity Award	Won	
Melon Music Awards	2016	Exo	Kakao Hot Star Award	Won	
Melon Music Awards	2016	Ex'Act	Album of the Year	Nominated	
Melon Music Awards	2016	"Monster"	Best Male Dance	Won	
Melon Music Awards	2017	Exo	Artist of the Year	Won	
Melon Music Awards	2017	Exo	Top 10 Artists	Won	
Melon Music Awards	2017	Exo	Netizen Popularity Award	Won	
Melon Music Awards	2017	Exo	Kakao Hot Star Award	Nominated	
Melon Music Awards	2017	The War	Album of the Year	Nominated	
Melon Music Awards	2017	"Ko Ko Bop"	Song of the Year	Nominated	
Melon Music Awards	2017	"Ko Ko Bop"	Best Male Dance	Won	
Melon Music Awards	2018	Exo	Artist of the Year	Nominated	
Melon Music Awards	2018	Exo	Top 10 Artists	Won	
Melon Music Awards	2018	Exo	Netizen Popularity Award	Nominated	
Melon Music Awards	2018	Universe	Album of the Year	Nominated	
Melon Music Awards	2019	Exo	Top 10 Artists	Won	
Melon Music Awards	2019	Exo	Artist of the Year	Nominated	
Melon Music Awards	2019	Exo	Netizen Popularity Award	Nominated	
Melon Music Awards	2019	"Love Shot"	Best Male Dance	Nominated	
Melon Music Awards	2023	Exist	Millions' Top 10 Artists	Nominated	
Mengniu Billboard Music Festival (Note: Established in 2008, the Mengniu Billboard Music Festival is an annual music festival held in China, which honors rookie artists with awards in ten different categories.)	2012	Exo	Best Dressed	Won	
Mengniu Billboard Music Festival	2012	Exo-M	Most Popular Group of the Year	Won	
Mengniu Billboard Music Festival	2013	Exo-M	Most Popular Group of the Year	Won	
Mengniu Billboard Music Festival	2013	Exo	Best Group	Won	
Meus Prêmios Nick	2021	"Love Shot"	Favorite International Hit	Nominated	
Miguhui Awards (Note: The Miguhui Awards are an annual music awards show that was established in 2007 and is sponsored by China Mobile.)	2014	Exo	Best Group Award	Won	
Miguhui Awards	2014	Exo	Best Performance Award	Won	
MTV Europe Music Awards	2013	Exo	Best Korean Act	Won	
MTV Europe Music Awards	2013	Exo	Best Worldwide Act	Nominated	
MTV Millennial Awards	2018	Exo	Revolution K-pop	Nominated	
MTV Millennial Awards	2018	Exo	Fandom of the Year	Nominated	
MTV Millennial Awards	2019	Exo	K-pop Explosion	Nominated	
MTV Millennial Awards	2022	Exo	Best Fandom	Nominated	
MTV Millennial Awards Brazil	2018	Exo	K-pop Explosion	Nominated	
MTV Millennial Awards Brazil	2019	Exo	K-pop Explosion	Nominated	
MTV Video Music Awards	2019	"Tempo"	Best K-pop	Nominated	
MTV Video Music Awards	2020	"Obsession"	Best K-pop	Nominated	
Myx Music Awards	2014	"Wolf"	Favourite K-Pop Video	Won	
Myx Music Awards	2015	"Overdose"	Favourite K-Pop Video	Nominated	
Philippine K-pop Awards	2012	Exo	Rookie of the Year	Won	
Philippine K-pop Awards	2014	Exo	Best Male Group	Won	
Philippine K-pop Awards	2015	Exo	Best Male Group	Won	
Philippine K-pop Awards	2015	Exodus	Album of the Year	Won	
Philippine K-pop Awards	2016	Ex'Act	Album of the Year	Won	
Philippine K-pop Awards	2017	Exo	Best Male Group	Won	
Philippine K-pop Awards	2018	Don't Mess Up My Tempo	Album of the Year	Won	
Red Dot Awards (Note: Established in 1993, the Red Dot Awards are an annual product design awards show held in Berlin, Germany, that honors excellence in design and innovation.)	2014	Mama	Communication Design Award - Packaging	Won	
Red Dot Awards	2015	XOXO	Communication Design Award - Packaging	Won	
SBS Awards Festival	2014	Exo	Top 10 Artists	Won	
SBS Awards Festival	2014	Exo	Best Male Group	Won	
SBS Awards Festival	2014	Overdose	Best Album	Won	
Seoul Music Awards	2013	Exo-K	New Artist Award	Won	
Seoul Music Awards	2014	Exo	Bonsang Award	Won	
Seoul Music Awards	2014	Exo	Daesang Award	Won	
Seoul Music Awards	2014	"Growl"	Best Song	Won	
Seoul Music Awards	2015	Exo	Bonsang Award	Won	
Seoul Music Awards	2015	Exo	Mobile Popularity Award	Won	
Seoul Music Awards	2015	Exo	Daesang Award	Won	
Seoul Music Awards	2016	Exo	Bonsang Award	Won	
Seoul Music Awards	2016	Exo	Hallyu Special Award	Won	
Seoul Music Awards	2016	Exo	Daesang Award	Won	
Seoul Music Awards	2017	Exo	Bonsang Award	Won	
Seoul Music Awards	2017	Exo	Mobile Popularity Award	Nominated	
Seoul Music Awards	2017	Exo	Hallyu Special Award	Nominated	
Seoul Music Awards	2017	Exo	Fandom School Award	Won	
Seoul Music Awards	2017	Exo	Daesang Award	Won	
Seoul Music Awards	2018	Exo	Bonsang Award	Won	
Seoul Music Awards	2018	Exo	Daesang Award	Nominated	
Seoul Music Awards	2018	Exo	Mobile Popularity Award	Nominated	
Seoul Music Awards	2018	Exo	Hallyu Special Award	Won	
Seoul Music Awards	2018	Exo	Fandom School Award	Won	
Seoul Music Awards	2019	Exo	Popularity Award	Nominated	
Seoul Music Awards	2019	Exo	Hallyu Special Award	Won	
Seoul Music Awards	2019	Exo	Bonsang Award	Won	
Seoul Music Awards	2019	Exo	Daesang Award	Nominated	
Seoul Music Awards	2020	Exo	Bonsang Award	Won	
Seoul Music Awards	2020	Exo	Daesang Award	Nominated	
Seoul Music Awards	2020	Exo	Hallyu Special Award	Won	
Seoul Music Awards	2020	Exo	Popularity Award	Won	
Seoul Music Awards	2020	Exo	QQ Music Popularity Award	Won	
Seoul Music Awards	2021	Exo	Bonsang Award	Nominated	
Seoul Music Awards	2021	Exo	Popularity Award	Nominated	
Seoul Music Awards	2021	Exo	K-wave Popularity Award	Nominated	
Seoul Music Awards	2021	Exo	Fan PD Artist Award	Nominated	
Seoul Music Awards	2021	Exo	WhosFandom Award	Nominated	
Seoul Music Awards	2022	Exo	Main Prize (Bonsang)	Nominated	
Seoul Music Awards	2022	Exo	K-wave Special Award	Won	
Seoul Music Awards	2022	Exo	U+Idol Live Best Artist Award	Nominated	
Seoul Music Awards	2022	Exo	Popularity Award	Nominated	
Seoul Music Awards	2026	Exo	Golden Revival Award	Won	
Soribada Best K-Music Awards	2017	Exo	New Hallyu Popularity Award	Won	
Soribada Best K-Music Awards	2017	Exo	Bonsang Award	Won	
Soribada Best K-Music Awards	2017	Exo	Daesang Award	Won	
Soribada Best K-Music Awards	2018	Exo	Bonsang Award	Nominated	
Soribada Best K-Music Awards	2018	Exo	People's Choice Award	Won	
Soribada Best K-Music Awards	2019	Exo	Popularity Award (Male)	Nominated	
Soribada Best K-Music Awards	2020	Exo	Bonsang Award	Nominated	
Teen Choice Awards	2016	Exo	Choice International Artist	Nominated	
Teen Choice Awards	2017	Exo	Choice International Artist	Nominated	
Teen Choice Awards	2018	Exo	Choice International Artist	Nominated	
Teen Choice Awards	2019	Exo	Choice International Artist	Nominated	
Tencent Music Entertainment Awards	2021	Exo	Best Overseas Group	Won	
Top Chinese Music Awards	2013	Exo-M	Most Popular Group	Won	
Top Chinese Music Awards	2013	Exo	Best Group	Won	
Top Chinese Music Awards	2014	Exo	Best Musical Band and Group	Nominated	
Top Chinese Music Awards	2014	Exo	Best Dance Music Artist	Nominated	
Top Chinese Music Awards	2016	Exo	Most Popular Overseas Group	Won	
Top Chinese Music Awards	2016	Exo	Best Overseas Group	Won	
V Chart Awards	2013	Exo-M	Mainland China's Most Popular Artist	Won	
V Chart Awards	2013	Exo-M	Mainland China's Best Rookie Group	Won	
V Chart Awards	2014	XOXO	Album of the Year — South Korea	Won	
V Chart Awards	2015	Overdose	Album of the Year — South Korea	Won	
V Chart Awards	2016	Exodus	Album of the Year — South Korea	Won	
V Chart Awards	2017	Exo	Most Influential Group in Asia	Won	
V Live Awards (Note: The V Live Awards are annual awards that honor artists' popularity on the live video streaming service V Live.)	2017	Exo	Global Artist Top 10	Won	
V Live Awards	2018	Exo	Global Artist Top 10	Won	
V Live Awards	2019	Exo	Global Artist Top 10	Won	
V Live Awards	2019	Exo	Global Top 12	Won	
V Live Awards	2019	Exo	Best Channel – 5 million followers	Nominated	
V Live Awards	2019	Exo	The Most Loved Artist	Nominated	
V Live Awards	2019	Exo Comeback Showcase "Tempo"	Video of the Year	Nominated	
World Music Awards	2014	Exo	World's Best-Selling Korean Artist	Won	
World Music Awards	2014	"Growl"	World's Best Song	Won	
Youku Night (Note: Youku Night is an annual awards show held in China by Youku, one of the largest online video sharing websites in the country.)	2015	Exo	Most Popular Asian Group	Won	
Youku Night	2015	Exo	Best Asian Performance	Won	

== Other accolades ==
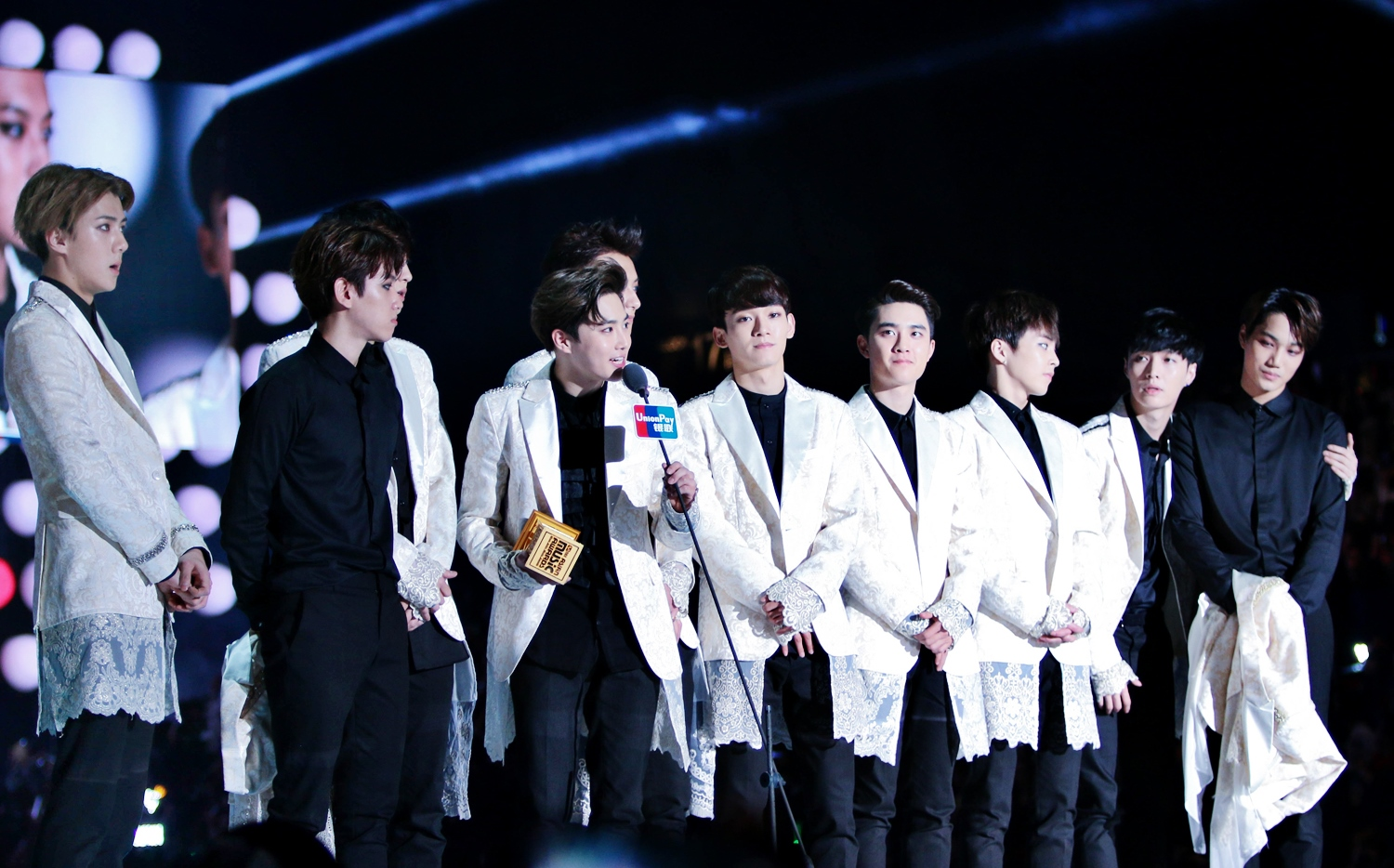
Exo at the Mnet Asian Music Awards in 2014

=== State and cultural honors ===
Name of country or organization, year given, and name of honor
Country or organization	Year	Honor	Ref.
South Korea (Note: Awarded at the Korean Popular Culture and Arts Awards, organized by the Korea Creative Content Agency and hosted by the South Korean Ministry of Culture, Sports and Tourism. Commendations are given to individuals or groups for their contribution to popular culture in South Korea and abroad.)	2014	Minister of Culture, Sports and Tourism Commendation	
South Korea	2017	Prime Minister's Commendation	
South Korea	2019	Star of Korean Tourism	

=== Listicles ===
Name of publisher, year listed, name of listicle, and placement
Publisher	Year	Listicle	Placement	Ref.
The Dong-a Ilbo	2016	Best Male Artists According to Experts	5th	
Forbes	2014	Korea Power Celebrity	5th	
Forbes	2015	Korea Power Celebrity	1st	
Forbes	2016	Korea Power Celebrity	1st	
Forbes	2017	Korea Power Celebrity	4th	
Forbes	2018	Korea Power Celebrity	4th	
Forbes	2019	Korea Power Celebrity	10th	
Forbes	2020	100 Digital Stars (Asia)	Placed	
Forbes Korea	2025	K-Idol of the Year 30	22nd	
Idolator	2019	Most Iconic Boy Bands in History	Placed	
Teen Vogue	2022	33 Best Boy Bands of All Time	Placed	

=== World records ===
Key
†	Indicates a now former record holder (Note: Note that this does not indicate that Exo lost the record, only that the listed record holder was eventually surpassed.)

Name of publication, year the record was awarded, name of the record, and the name of the record holder
Publication	Year	World record	Record holder	Ref.
Guinness World Records	2018	Most Daesang ("Grand Prize") awards won at the Mnet Asian Music Awards	† Exo	

== See also ==
- List of awards and nominations received by Exo-CBX
- List of awards and nominations received by Exo-SC
- List of awards and nominations received by Xiumin
- List of awards and nominations received by Suho
- List of awards and nominations received by Lay Zhang
- List of awards and nominations received by Baekhyun
- List of awards and nominations received by Chen
- List of awards and nominations received by Chanyeol
- List of awards and nominations received by D.O.
- List of awards and nominations received by Kai
- List of awards and nominations received by Sehun
