= Hear Me Out =

"Hear Me Out" may refer to:

== Television ==
- Hear Me Out (TV series), a Singaporean info-ed TV series

== Music ==
=== Albums ===
- Hear Me Out, a 2001 solo piano album by Don Preston
- Hear Me Out, a 2009 album by Loïs Lane
- Hear Me Out, an album by VanVelzen, sequel to Take Me In
- Hear Me Out, a 2006 album by The Joel Streeter Band with Jerry Becker

=== Songs ===
- "Hear Me Out", by Ben Kweller from On My Way, 2004
- "Hear Me Out", by Close to Home
- "Hear Me Out", by Don Cannon
- "Hear Me Out", by Exo from Exist, 2023
- "Hear Me Out", by Frou Frou from Details, 2002
- "Hear Me Out", by Girls Aloud from What Will the Neighbours Say?, 2004
- "Hear Me Out", by Go Radio from Close the Distance, 2012
- "Hear Me Out", by Hidden in Plain View from Resolution, 2007
- "Hear Me Out", by Infinity from Naked in the Rain, 2002
- "Hear Me Out", by Irma from Faces, 2014
- "Hear Me Out", by Lowe, 2004
- "Hear Me Out", by Maggie Lindemann from Suckerpunch, 2022
- "Hear Me Out", by Scuba Dice from Scuba Dice EP 2, 2008
- "Hear Me Out", by Silverstein from When Broken Is Easily Fixed, 2003
- "Hear Me Out", by Vengeance, 1988
