= Let Me In (Exo song) =

Single by Exo

from the album Exist
- Language: Korean
- Released: June 12, 2023
- Recorded: 2023
- Studio: Sound Pool (Seoul)
- Genre: K-ballad
- Length: 3:18
- Label: SM; Kakao
- Composers: Je'Juan Antonio; Hassan Ashi Jr.; Jayden Henry; Jordain Johnson; Kelsey Merges; Noah Barer; Kaelin Ellis; Hautboi Rich
- Lyricist: Enzo
- Producers: Noah Barer; Kaelin Ellis

Exo singles chronology
"Bird" (The Best version) (2023)	"Let Me In" (2023)	"Hear Me Out" (2023)

Music video
- "Let Me In" on YouTube

"Let Me In" is a song by South Korean–Chinese boy band Exo, released on June 12, 2023, by SM Entertainment as the first single from their seventh studio album, Exist. The single became Exo's first Korean single release in two years since "Don't Fight the Feeling".

== Background ==
After 2021's release of Don't Fight the Feeling, Exo entered hiatus due to most of its members were undergoing their mandatory military service namely — Suho, Chen, Chanyeol, and Baekhyun.

In 2022, most of the members were participating in personal activities. After his discharge from military service, Suho released his second extended play, Grey Suit, followed by Xiumin who became Exo's seventh member to debut as a soloist through the release of Brand New in September. Chen also released an EP, Last Scene that November.

In January 2023, Exo's leader Suho wished the fans a happy new year and confirmed the group would have a comeback at some point in 2023, with the date yet to be announced. A month later, Baekhyun was discharged from his mandatory military service on February 5, completing Exo's lineup once again.

On February 28, Exo released a poster for their fan meet on April 8, and 9 titled "EXO' Clock" to celebrate their 11th anniversary in the KSPO Dome. During the event, they announced that three music videos were in production, and also performed a new song, which would eventually be revealed as "Let Me In".

On June 12, the song was released as a pre-release single at 6 PM KST ahead of their full-length album in July. The single featured the vocals of eight members (except Lay), including Kai who enlisted as a public service worker a month earlier.

== Composition ==
"Let Me In" was composed by Je'Juan Antonio, Hassan Ashi Jr, Jayden Henry, Jordain Johnson, Kelsey Merges, Noah Barer, Kaelin Ellis, and Hautboi Rich, and it was arranged by Barer and Ellis. The song is classified as a ballad song with a melodic dream sound, which features an emotional vocal performance by the members. The lyrics were written by Enzo, comparing a lover to the blue sea, and describing the desperate feeling of wanting to be together even though it means falling deeper and deeper.

== Music video ==
On June 12, the music video was released along with the song. In the music video, the group appear in a series of picturesque backgrounds. They attempt to reunite with one another before a meteor strikes the Earth. In the end, after being reunited, time seemingly rewinds itself.

== Credits and personnel ==
Credits adapted from the album's liner notes.

=== Studio ===
- Sound Pool Studio – recording, digital editing
- SM Yellow Tail Studio – engineered for mix
- SM Concert Hall Studio – mixing
- 821 Sound – mastering

=== Personnel ===
- SM Entertainment – executive producer
- Jang Cheol-hyuk – executive supervisor
- Exo – vocals
  - Suho – background vocals
  - Baekhyun – background vocals
  - Chen – background vocals
  - D.O. – background vocals
- Noah Barer – producer, composition, arrangement
- Kaelin Ellis – producer, composition, arrangement
- Enzo – lyrics
- Je'Juan Antonio – composition
- Hassan Ashi Jr. – composition
- Jayden Henry – composition
- Jordain Johnson – composition
- Kelsey Merges – composition
- Hautboi Rich – composition
- Emily Kim Yeon-seo – vocal directing
- Esbee – background vocals
- Woo Min-jeong – recording, digital editing
- Noh Min-ji – engineered for mix
- Nam Koong-jin – mixing
- Kwon Nam-woo – mastering

== Charts ==
Chart performance for "Let Me In"
Chart (2023)	Peak position
South Korea (Gaon)	106
US World Digital Songs (Billboard)	5

== Release history ==
Release history for "Let Me In"
Region	Date	Format	Label
Various	June 12, 2023	Digital download; streaming	SM; Kakao
