= Obsession (Exo song) =

Single by Exo

from the album Obsession
- Language: Korean; Mandarin
- Released: November 27, 2019
- Recorded: 2019
- Studio: SM LVYIN (Seoul)
- Genre: K-pop; hip hop; R&B
- Length: 3:23
- Label: SM; Dreamus
- Composers: Cristi "Stalone" Gallo; Asia'h Epperson; Adrian McKinnon; Dwayne Allen Abernathy, Jr.; Ryan S. Jhun; Yoo Young-jin
- Lyricists: Kenzie; Arys Chien
- Producer: Dem Jointz

Exo singles chronology
"Bird" (2019)	"Obsession" (2019)	"Don't Fight the Feeling" (2021)

Music video
- "Obsession" on YouTube

"Obsession" is a song by South Korean–Chinese boy band Exo, released on November 27, 2019, as the lead single of their sixth studio album Obsession. The music video was released on the same date.

== Background and composition ==
Produced by Dem Jointz, who also co-wrote with Cristi "Stalone" Gallo, Asia'h Epperson, Ryan S. Jhun, Adrian McKinnon, Arys Chien, Kenzie and Yoo Young-jin, "Obsession" is described as a hip-hop dance track featuring repeating spell-like vocal samples over a heavy beat, as well as an addictive R&B infused chorus. The lyrics convey a straightforward monologue of ones willingness to escape from the darkness of an awful obsession.

== Music video ==
The music video was directed by labelmate Shindong.

On August 12, 2020, the music video surpassed 100 million views on YouTube, becoming their eleventh to do so.

== Promotion ==
Exo promoted the album and song with teasers throughout November 2019, including a minute-long EXODEUX concept trailer, which showcases the member's "X-Exo" alter-ego's, as well as a music video teaser which was released 6 hours before the music video.

== Accolades ==
Awards
Year	Organization	Award	Result	Ref.
2020	MTV Video Music Awards	Best K-pop	Nominated	
2020	Mnet Asian Music Awards	Best Dance Performance – Male Group	Nominated	

Year-end lists
Critic/Publication	List	Rank	Ref.
Billboard	The 25 Best K-pop Songs of 2019	1	
Dazed	The 20 best K-pop songs of 2019	13	
Refinery29	The 20 best K-pop songs of 2019	16	
BuzzFeed	Best K-pop Music Videos of 2019	2	

Music program awards
Program	Date	Ref.
Music Bank	December 6, 2019	
Music Bank	December 13, 2019	
Show! Music Core	December 7, 2019	
Show! Music Core	December 14, 2019	
Show Champion	December 11, 2019	

== Credits and personnel ==
Credits adapted from the album's liner notes.

Studio

- SM LVYIN Studio – recording, digital editing
- SM Blue Cup Studio – mixing
- 821 Sound – mastering

Personnel

- SM Entertainment – executive producer
- Lee Soo-man – producer
- Lee Sung-soo – production director
- Exo – vocals
  - Baekhyun – background vocals
  - Chen – background vocals
- Kenzie – Korean lyrics, vocal directing
- Arys Chien – Chinese lyrics
- Dem Jointz – producer, composition, arrangement
- Cristi "Stalone" Gallo – composition, background vocals
- Asia'h Epperson – composition
- Adrian McKinnon – composition
- Ryan S. Jhun – composition
- Yoo Young-jin – composition, music and sound supervisor
- Lee Ji-hong – recording, digital editing, engineered for mix
- Noh Min-ji – recording
- Jung Eui-seok – mixing
- Kwon Nam-woo – mastering

== Charts ==
=== Weekly charts ===
Weekly chart performance for "Obsession"
Chart (2019)	Peak position
Japan (Japan Hot 100)	33
New Zealand Hot Singles (RMNZ)	21
Singapore (RIAS Regional)	5
South Korea (Gaon)	13
South Korea (K-pop Hot 100)	5
UK Indie Breakers (OCC)	17
US World Digital Songs (Billboard)	1

=== Monthly charts ===
Monthly chart performance for "Obsession"
Chart (2019)	Peak position
South Korea (Gaon)	26

=== Year-end charts ===
Year-end chart performance for "Obsession"
Chart (2020)	Position
South Korea (Gaon)	151

== Sales ==
Sales for "Obsession"
Region	Sales
Japan	5,099
United States	2,000

== Release history ==
Release history for "Obsession"
Region	Date	Format	Label
South Korea	November 27, 2019	Digital download; streaming	SM; Dreamus
Various	November 27, 2019	Digital download; streaming	SM
