= List of awards and nominations received by Baekhyun =

Baekhyun awards and nominations
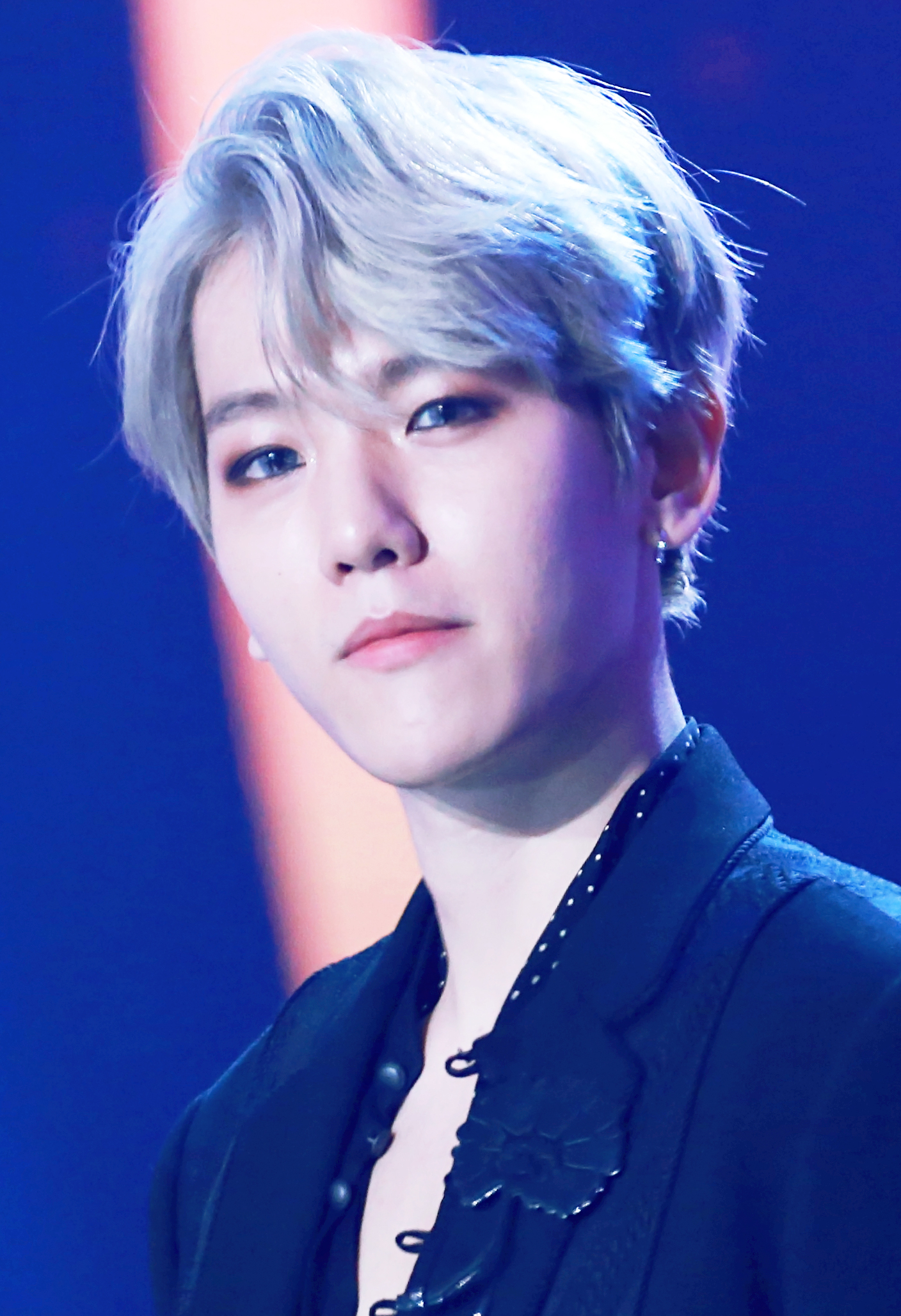
- Baekhyun at the 2017 Melon Music Awards
Awards and nominations
Award	Wins	Nominations
Asia Artist Awards	1	4
APAN Star Awards	0	1
Asian Pop Music Awards	5	10
Baeksang Arts Awards	0	1
Brand Customer Loyalty Awards	0	1
Brand of the Year Awards	0	1
Fandom School Awards	1	1
Gaon Chart Music Awards	1	7
Genie Music Awards	0	1
Golden Disc Awards	4	7
Hanteo Music Awards	2	2
Korean Music Awards	0	1
MAMA Awards	5	27
Melon Music Awards	3	10
SBS Drama Awards	1	1
Seoul International Drama Awards	0	1
Seoul Music Awards	0	16
Soompi Awards	3	4
Soribada Best K-Music Awards	0	1
YinYueTai V-Chart Awards	1	1

Totals (Note: Certain award groups do not simply award one winner. They acknowledge several different recipients, have runners-up, and have third place. Since this is a specific recognition and is different from losing an award, runner-up mentions are considered wins in this award tally. For simplification and to avoid errors, each award in this list has been presumed to have had a prior nomination.)
- Wins: 27
- Nominations: 99

This is a list of awards and nominations received by South Korean singer, songwriter, and actor Baekhyun.

== Awards and nominations ==
Name of the award ceremony, year presented, nominee(s) of the award, award category, and the result of the nomination
Award	Year	Category	Recipient	Result	Ref.
Asia Artist Awards	2016	Popularity Award, Actor	Baekhyun	Won	
Asia Artist Awards	2016	Best Rookie Award	Moon Lovers: Scarlet Heart Ryeo	Nominated	
Asia Artist Awards	2018	Popularity Award, Actor	Baekhyun	Nominated	
Asia Artist Awards	2026	Popularity Award – Solo (Male)	Baekhyun	Pending	
APAN Star Awards	2020	Best OST	"My Love"	Nominated	
Asian Pop Music Awards	2020	Best Male Artist (Overseas)	Baekhyun	Won	
Asian Pop Music Awards	2021	Best Male Artist (Overseas)	Baekhyun	Nominated	
Asian Pop Music Awards	2021	Best Dance Performance (Overseas)	Bambi	Nominated	
Asian Pop Music Awards	2021	People's Choice Award (Overseas)	Bambi	Won	
Asian Pop Music Awards	2021	Top 20 Albums of the Year (Overseas)	Bambi	Won	
Asian Pop Music Awards	2021	Best Album of the Year (Overseas)	Bambi	Nominated	
Asian Pop Music Awards	2021	Top 20 Songs of the Year (Overseas)	"Bambi"	Won	
Asian Pop Music Awards	2021	Song of the Year (Overseas)	"Bambi"	Nominated	
Asian Pop Music Awards	2021	Best OST (Overseas)	"U"	Won	
Asian Pop Music Awards	2021	Best Collaboration (with Colde) (Overseas)	"When Dawn Comes Again"	Nominated	
Baeksang Arts Awards	2017	Most Popular Actor (TV)	Moon Lovers: Scarlet Heart Ryeo	Nominated	
Brand Customer Loyalty Awards	2021	Male Solo Singer	Baekhyun	Nominated	
Brand of the Year Awards	2020	Male Artist of the Year	Baekhyun	Nominated	
Fandom School Awards	2017	Individual Popularity Award	Baekhyun	Won	
Gaon Chart Music Awards	2017	Song of the Year – January (with Suzy)	"Dream"	Nominated	
Gaon Chart Music Awards	2019	Album of the Year – 3rd Quarter	City Lights	Nominated	
Gaon Chart Music Awards	2020	Artist of the Year – Digital Music (May)	"Candy"	Nominated	
Gaon Chart Music Awards	2020	Artist of the Year – Digital Music (May) (with Bolbbalgan4)	"Leo"	Nominated	
Gaon Chart Music Awards	2020	Artist of the Year – Physical (2nd Quarter)	Delight	Won	
Gaon Chart Music Awards	2020	MuBeat Global Choice Award (Male)	Baekhyun	Nominated	
Gaon Chart Music Awards	2021	Artist of the Year – Physical (2nd Quarter)	Bambi	Nominated	
Genie Music Awards	2020	Artist of the Year	Baekhyun	Nominated	
Golden Disc Awards	2016	Digital Bonsang (with Suzy)	"Dream"	Won	
Golden Disc Awards	2016	Asian Choice Popularity Award (with Suzy)	"Dream"	Won	
Golden Disc Awards	2019	Disc Bonsang	City Lights	Won	
Golden Disc Awards	2019	Disc Daesang	City Lights	Nominated	
Golden Disc Awards	2020	Disc Bonsang	Delight	Won	
Golden Disc Awards	2020	Disc Daesang	Delight	Nominated	
Golden Disc Awards	2020	Digital Song Bonsang (with Bolbbalgan4)	"Leo"	Nominated	
Hanteo Music Awards	2021	Initial Chodong Record Award	Baekhyun	Won	
Hanteo Music Awards	2021	Artist Award – Male Solo (Top 3)	Baekhyun	Won	
Korean Music Awards	2021	Best Pop Album	Delight	Nominated	
MAMA Awards	2016	Best Collaboration (with Suzy)	"Dream"	Won	
MAMA Awards	2016	Song of the Year (with Suzy)	"Dream"	Nominated	
MAMA Awards	2017	Best Collaboration (with Soyou)	"Rain"	Nominated	
MAMA Awards	2017	Song of the Year (with Soyou)	"Rain"	Nominated	
MAMA Awards	2019	Best Male Artist	Baekhyun	Won	
MAMA Awards	2019	Artist of the Year	Baekhyun	Nominated	
MAMA Awards	2020	Best Male Artist	Baekhyun	Won	
MAMA Awards	2020	Artist of the Year	Baekhyun	Nominated	
MAMA Awards	2020	Best Vocal Performance – Solo	"Candy"	Nominated	
MAMA Awards	2020	Song of the Year	"Candy"	Nominated	
MAMA Awards	2020	Album of the Year	Delight	Nominated	
MAMA Awards	2020	Best Collaboration (with Bolbbalgan4)	"Leo"	Nominated	
MAMA Awards	2020	Song of the Year (with Bolbbalgan4)	"Leo"	Nominated	
MAMA Awards	2021	Best Male Artist	Baekhyun	Won	
MAMA Awards	2021	Artist of the Year	Baekhyun	Nominated	
MAMA Awards	2021	Album of the Year	Bambi	Nominated	
MAMA Awards	2021	Song of the Year	"Bambi"	Nominated	
MAMA Awards	2021	Best Dance Performance – Solo	"Bambi"	Nominated	
MAMA Awards	2024	Album of the Year	Hello, World	Nominated	
MAMA Awards	2024	Artist of the Year	Baekhyun	Nominated	
MAMA Awards	2024	Best Male Artist	Baekhyun	Nominated	
MAMA Awards	2024	Worldwide Fans' Choice Top 10	Baekhyun	Nominated	
MAMA Awards	2025	Artist of the Year	Baekhyun	Nominated	
MAMA Awards	2025	Album of the year	Essence of Reverie	Nominated	
MAMA Awards	2025	Best Male Artist	Baekhyun	Nominated	
MAMA Awards	2025	Fans' Choice of the Year	Baekhyun	Nominated	
MAMA Awards	2025	Fans' Choice Top 10 – Male	Baekhyun	Won	
Melon Music Awards	2016	Best R&B / Soul (with Suzy)	"Dream"	Won	
Melon Music Awards	2016	Song of the Year (Daesang) (with Suzy)	"Dream"	Nominated	
Melon Music Awards	2018	Hot Trend Award (with Loco)	"Young"	Nominated	
Melon Music Awards	2020	Top 10 Artist Bonsang	Baekhyun	Won	
Melon Music Awards	2020	Artist of the Year (Daesang)	Baekhyun	Nominated	
Melon Music Awards	2020	Album of the Year (Daesang)	Delight	Nominated	
Melon Music Awards	2020	Best R&B/Soul Award	"Candy"	Nominated	
Melon Music Awards	2020	Netizen Popularity Award	Baekhyun	Nominated	
Melon Music Awards	2020	Best Indie Award (with Bolbbalgan4)	"Leo"	Won	
Melon Music Awards	2021	Top 10 Artist Bonsang	Baekhyun	Nominated	
SBS Drama Awards	2017	New Star Award	Moon Lovers: Scarlet Heart Ryeo	Won	
Seoul International Drama Awards	2021	Excellent Korean Drama OST	"Happy"	Nominated	
Seoul Music Awards	2020	Bonsang Award	Baekhyun	Nominated	
Seoul Music Awards	2020	Popularity Award	Baekhyun	Nominated	
Seoul Music Awards	2020	The K-wave Special Award	Baekhyun	Nominated	
Seoul Music Awards	2021	Bonsang Award	Baekhyun	Nominated	
Seoul Music Awards	2021	R&B Hip Hop Award	Baekhyun	Nominated	
Seoul Music Awards	2021	OST Award	"My Love"	Nominated	
Seoul Music Awards	2021	Popularity Award	Baekhyun	Nominated	
Seoul Music Awards	2021	The K-wave Special Award	Baekhyun	Nominated	
Seoul Music Awards	2022	Bonsang Award	Baekhyun	Nominated	
Seoul Music Awards	2022	Popularity Award	Baekhyun	Nominated	
Seoul Music Awards	2022	The K-wave Special Award	Baekhyun	Nominated	
Seoul Music Awards	2023	OST Award	Baekhyun	Won	
Seoul Music Awards	2025	Main Prize (Bonsang)	Baekhyun	Nominated	
Seoul Music Awards	2025	Popularity Award	Baekhyun	Nominated	
Seoul Music Awards	2025	K-Wave Special Award	Baekhyun	Nominated	
Seoul Music Awards	2025	K-pop World Choice – Solo	Baekhyun	Nominated	
Soompi Awards	2017	Best Idol Actor	Baekhyun	Won	
Soompi Awards	2017	Best Collaboration	"Dream"	Won	
Soompi Awards	2018	Best Male Solo	Baekhyun	Won	
Soompi Awards	2018	Best Collaboration	"Rain"	Nominated	
Soribada Best K-Music Awards	2020	Bonsang Award	Baekhyun	Nominated	
YinYueTai V-Chart Awards	2017	Most Popular Singer (South Korea)	Baekhyun	Won	

== See also ==
- List of awards and nominations received by Exo
