= Don't Fight the Feeling (song) =

2021 single by Exo

Single by Exo

from the EP Don't Fight the Feeling
- Language: Korean
- Released: June 7, 2021
- Recorded: 2021
- Studio: SM LVYIN (Seoul); 21A (Beijing); doobdoob (Seoul)
- Genre: Dance-pop
- Length: 2:57
- Label: SM; Dreamus
- Composers: Moon Kim; Tiyon “TC” Mack; Chaz Jackson; Orlando Williamson; Damon Thomas; Mike J; Tesung Kim
- Lyricist: Kenzie
- Producer: The Aristocrats

Exo singles chronology
"Obsession" (2019)	"Don't Fight the Feeling" (2021)	"Bird -The Best Ver.-" (2023)

Music video
- "Don't Fight the Feeling" on YouTube

"Don't Fight the Feeling" is a song released by South Korean–Chinese boy band Exo on June 7, 2021, as the lead single of their seventh extended play of the same name. The single marked the group's comeback from their two-year hiatus, and the only song to be released as a seven-member group.

== Background ==
After the release of Obsession, and embarking on their fifth concert tour in 2019, Exo entered hiatus in the following year and did not release new materials after two of its members, Suho and Chen enlisted for their mandatory military service on May 14, and October 26, respectively. Their previously enlisted members — Xiumin was discharged on December 6, followed by D.O. on January 25, 2021 per the protocols to prevent the spread of COVID-19 pandemic in South Korea, and they resumed their activities with the group not long after.

On April 8, the group uploaded a video in which active members – Xiumin, Chanyeol, Baekhyun, D.O, Kai, and Sehun commemorated their ninth anniversary and revealed that they have been preparing for their next release before the enlistments of Chanyeol and Baekhyun. On May 26, Exo released teaser photo on their Twitter account confirming Lay's participation in the upcoming comeback. This marked his first activity with the group since his last appearance in the Chinese version of "Tempo" in 2018. However, Lay was unable to meet up with his bandmates during the album production due to the pandemic.

The single along with its music video was released alongside the album on June 7.

== Composition ==
"Don't Fight the Feeling" is a funky dance-pop song written by Kenzie and produced by The Aristocrats. The lyrics encourage the listeners to believe in themselves and always look for the future when facing difficulty.

== Music video ==
The music video revolves around science fiction themes showing the band dancing in what appears to be the deck of an aircraft carrier before it became a vessel heading to space. During an interview with Zach Sang, Lay said his appearance in the music video was made possible due to CGI because he was unable to meet up with his bandmates during the pandemic.

== Critical reception ==
Professional ratings
Review scores
Source	Rating
NME	4/5 stars

Writing for NME, Natasha Mulenga praised the song's uplifting theme and its catchy retro beats. However, she argued the song lacked attention-grabbing elements, unlike the band's previous releases, "Monster" (2016) and "Obsession".

== Credits and personnel ==
Credits adapted from the EP's liner notes.

=== Studio ===
- SM LVYIN Studio – recording, digital editing
- Studio 21A – recording
- doobdoob Studio – recording
- SM Starlight Studio – digital editing
- SM Big Shot Studio – engineered for mix
- SM Concert Hall Studio – mixing
- 821 Sound – mastering

=== Personnel ===
- SM Entertainment – executive producer
- Lee Soo-man – producer
- Lee Sung-soo – production director, executive supervisor
- Tak Young-jun – executive supervisor
- Yoo Young-jin – music and sound supervisor
- Exo – vocals
- Kenzie – lyrics
- Moon Kim – composition
- Tiyon "TC" Mack – composition, background vocals
- Chaz Jackson (The Aristocrats) – producer, composition, arrangement
- Orlando Williamson (The Aristocrats) – producer, composition, arrangement
- Damon Thomas – composition
- Mike J – composition
- Tesung Kim – composition
- Onestar – vocal directing, background vocals
- Tone Stith – background vocals
- Lee Ji-hong – recording, digital editing
- Z.Y.Lee – recording
- Jang Woo-young – recording
- Eugene Kwon – recording
- Jeong Yoo-ra – digital editing
- Lee Min-kyu – engineered for mix
- Nam Koong-jin – mixing
- Kwon Nam-woo – mastering

== Charts ==
Chart performance for "Don't Fight the Feeling"
Chart (2021)	Peak position
Global 200 (Billboard)	64
Japan (Japan Hot 100)	77
South Korea (Gaon)	15
South Korea (Kpop Hot 100)	57
UK Singles Downloads (OCC)	51
UK Singles Sales (OCC)	52
US World Digital Songs (Billboard)	6

== Release history ==
Release history for "Don't Fight the Feeling"
Region	Date	Format	Label
South Korea	June 7, 2021	Digital download; streaming	SM; Dreamus
Various	June 7, 2021	Digital download; streaming	SM
