= Cream Soda (song) =

Single by Exo

from the album Exist
- Language: Korean; English
- Released: July 10, 2023
- Recorded: 2023
- Studio: SM Big Shot (Seoul); SM LVYIN (Seoul); SM SSAM (Seoul)
- Genre: Dance-pop
- Length: 3:05
- Label: SM; Kakao
- Composers: Tre Jean-Marie; Kwame "KZ" Kwei-Armah Jr.; Ebenezer Fabiyi; Bobby Candler; Adrian Mckinnon
- Lyricist: Moon Seol-li
- Producers: Tre Jean-Marie; Kwame "KZ" Kwei-Armah Jr.; Imlay

Exo singles chronology
"Hear Me Out" (2023)	"Cream Soda" (2023)	"I'm Home" (2025)

Music video
- "Cream Soda" on YouTube

"Cream Soda" is a song by South Korean-Chinese boy band Exo, released on July 10, 2023, by SM Entertainment as the third single and title track for their seventh studio album Exist.

== Background and release ==
In January 2023, the group's leader, Suho, announced that the group was set to release new music after spring.

From July 3 to 6, 2023, a set of individual and group teaser images was released on Exo's official social media accounts with the caption "EXO 'Cream Soda'". On July 9, the music video teaser for "Cream Soda" was released. On July 10, Exo released the song alongside the music video and the album's release.

== Composition ==
"Cream Soda" was composed by Tre Jean-Marie, Kwame "KZ" Kwei-Armah Jr., Ebenezer Fabiyi, Bobby Candler and Adrian Mckinnon, and arranged by Jean-Marie, Kwei-Armah and Imlay. Produced in the key E Minor, with a tempo of 156 BPM, it is a dance-pop song with an exotic rhythm and upbeat brass, keyboard and drum instrumentation. It features sensual vocals, and the lyrics, which were written by Moon Seol-li, compare the soft yet thrilling moment of falling in love to cream soda.

== Accolades ==
"Cream Soda" won a first place on the music program Music Bank on July 21, 2023.

== Credits and personnel ==
Credits adapted from album's liner notes.

=== Studio ===
- SM Big Shot Studio – recording, digital editing
- SM LVYIN Studio – recording
- SM SSAM Studio – recording
- SM Blue Ocean Studio – mixing
- 821 Sound – mastering

=== Personnel ===
- SM Entertainment – executive producer
- Exo – vocals
- Moon Seol-li – lyrics
- Tre Jean-Marie – producer, composition, arrangement, instruments programming
- Kwame "KZ" Kwei-Armah Jr. – producer, composition, arrangement, instruments programming
- Ebenezer Fabiyi – composition
- Bobby Candler – composition
- Adrian McKinnon – composition
- IMLAY – producer, arrangement
- Young Chance – vocal directing, background vocals
- Lee Min-kyu – recording, digital editing
- Lee Ji-hong – recording
- Kang Eun-ji – recording
- Kim Cheol-sun – mixing
- Kwon Nam-woo – mastering

== Charts ==
=== Weekly charts ===
Weekly chart performance for "Cream Soda"
Chart (2023)	Peak position
Global 200 (Billboard)	86
South Korea (Circle)	13
US World Digital Song Sales (Billboard)	12
Vietnam (Vietnam Hot 100)	41

=== Monthly charts ===
Monthly chart performance for "Cream Soda"
Chart (2023)	Position
South Korea (Circle)	53

== Release history ==
Release history for "Cream Soda"
Region	Date	Format	Label
Various	July 10, 2023	Digital download; streaming	SM; Kakao
