= Alone (Lay song) =

Single by Lay

from the album Ex-Files 2 OST Pack
- Released: October 7, 2015
- Recorded: 2015
- Genre: C-pop; Ballad
- Length: 3:51
- Songwriter: Lay
- Producer: Lay

"Alone (One Person)" (Chinese: 一个人) is a song recorded by Chinese singer Lay (Zhang Yixing) which serves as the original soundtrack for the 2015 romantic comedy film Ex Files 2: The Backup Strikes Back. It was released on October 7, 2015.

== Background and release ==
Composed, arranged and lyrics written by Lay, "Alone" was officially released and disclosed to the public during a fan meeting at Shanghai Indoor Stadium which was coincidentally on his October 7, 2015 birthday.

== Reception ==
"Alone" ranked #1 on Baidu Music Chart and #4 on Billboard's China V Chart.

== Chart ==
Chart (2015)	Peak position
Chinese Singles (Baidu Music Chart)	1
Chinese Singles (Billboard)	4

== Accolades ==
Music
Year	Award	Category	Result	Ref.
2015	BaiduMusic King Awards	Best OST of the Year	Won	
2016	Top Chinese Music Awards	Best OST of the Year	Won	
2016	The 4th Vchart Awards	Best Film Song of the Year	Won	
