= List of awards and nominations received by Lay Zhang =

Lay Zhang awards and nominations
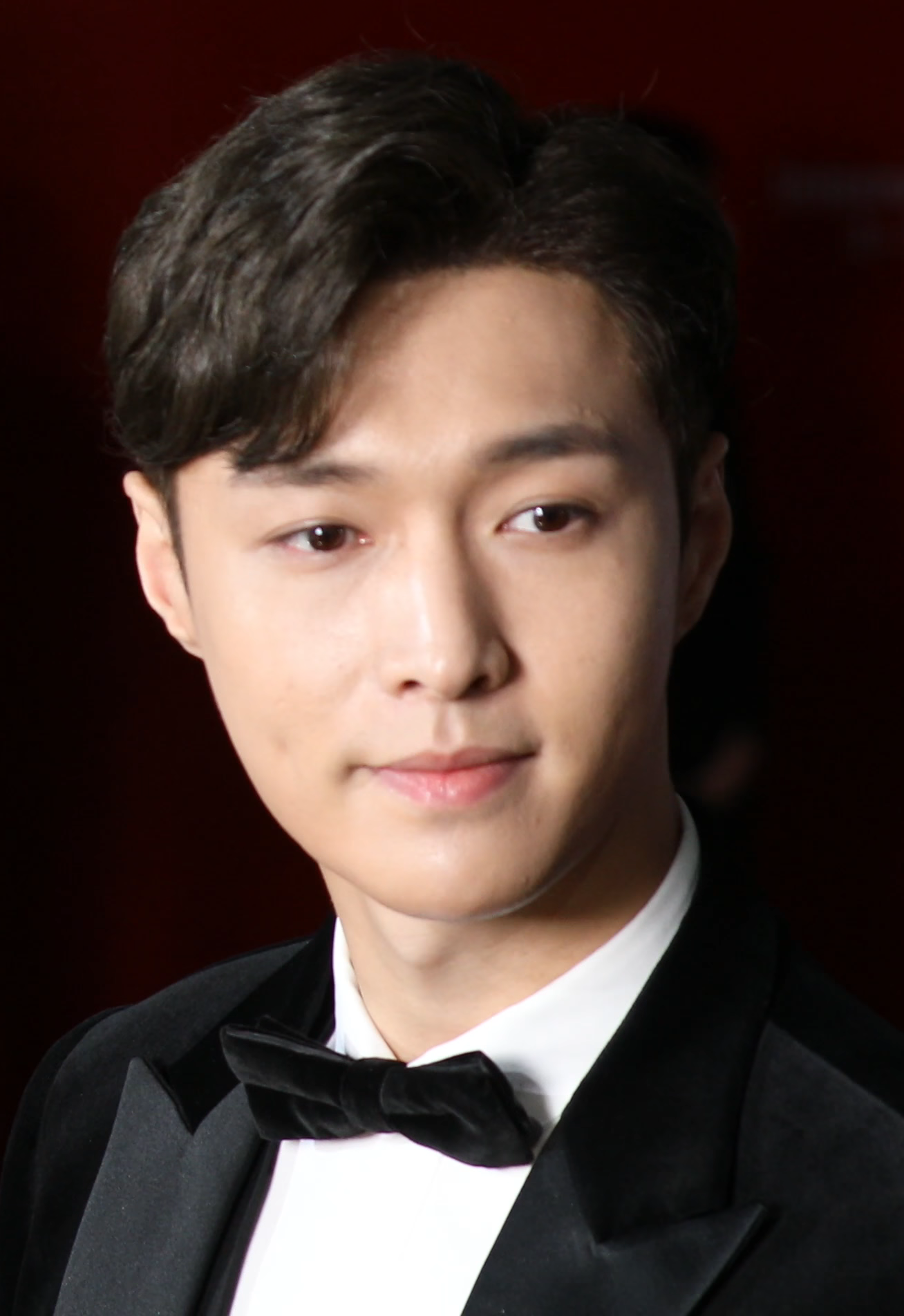
- Lay at Busan International Film Festival Opening Ceremony on October 4, 2018
Awards and nominations
Award	Wins	Nominations
Annual Power Fashion Awards	1	1
Asia Book Awards	1	1
Asian Influence Awards Oriental Ceremony	1	1
Asian Pop Music Awards	5	13
Baidu Baike Awards	1	1
Baidu Music King Awards	1	1
Billboard Radio China	1	1
CCTV Flowers in the May Gala	3	3
China Britain Film Festival	1	1
China Economic Publishing House	1	1
China Television Drama Quality Ceremony	1	1
China TV Golden Eagle Award	0	1
China Writer's Rich List Awards	1	1
China Year End Awards	2	2
Chinese Golden Melody Awards	2	2
Cosmopolitan Beauty Awards	1	1
Douyin's Award Gala	1	1
Eastern Entertainment Influence Awards	1	1
ENAwards	1	1
ERC Chinese Top Ten Awards	12	12
Esquire Man At His Best Awards	1	1
Guangzhou College Student Film Festival	1	1
GQ Men of the Year	1	1
Huading Awards	1	3
iQIYI Scream Night Awards	2	2
Jinri Toutiao Awards Ceremony	1	1
LeEco Entertainment Sharing Night Ceremony	1	1
Macau International Movie Festival	0	1
Pop Music Gold Chart Annual Festival	1	1
QQ Music Boom Boom Award	2	2
QQ Music Fusion Hip-Hop Awards	1	1
Tencent Music Entertainment Awards	4	4
Tencent Video Star Awards	1	1
The Actors of China Awards	0	2
Top Chinese Music Awards	2	2
Top China Music Billboard	1	4
V Chart Awards	3	3
Weibo Music Awards	8	8

Totals (Note: Certain award groups do not simply award one winner. They acknowledge several different recipients, have runners-up, and have third place. Since this is a specific recognition and is different from losing an award, runner-up mentions are considered wins in this award tally. For simplification and to avoid errors, each award in this list has been presumed to have had a prior nomination.)
- Wins: 72
- Nominations: 88

This is a list of awards and nominations received by Chinese singer-songwriter, music producer, and actor Lay Zhang.

== Awards and nominations ==
Name of the award ceremony, year presented, award category, nominee(s) and result of the nomination
Award ceremony	Year	Category	Nominee / work	Result	Ref.
Annual Power Fashion Awards	2018	Producer of the Year	Lay Zhang	Won	
Asia Book Awards	2016	Terrific Author of the Year	Standing Firm at 24	Won	
Asian Influence Awards Oriental Ceremony	2015	Best Influential All-Rounded Artist	Lay Zhang	Won	
Asian Pop Music Awards (Note: Hosted by the Hong Kong Asia Pacific International Group and Sunway Records, the Asian Pop Music Awards bases its winners on "Asian Pop Music Chart" which opened in September 2019.)	2020	Best Male Singer (Chinese)	Lay Zhang	Nominated	
Asian Pop Music Awards	2021	Top 20 Albums of the Year (Chinese)	East	Won	
Asian Pop Music Awards	2021	People's Choice Award (Chinese)	East	Won	
Asian Pop Music Awards	2021	Best Album of the Year (Chinese)	East	Nominated	
Asian Pop Music Awards	2021	Best Male Artist (Chinese)	Lay Zhang	Nominated	
Asian Pop Music Awards	2021	Best Dance Performance (Chinese)	"Flying Apsaras"	Nominated	
Asian Pop Music Awards	2022	Best Dance Performance (Chinese)	"Veil"	Won	
Asian Pop Music Awards	2022	Top 20 Albums of the Year (Chinese)	West	Won	
Asian Pop Music Awards	2022	People's Choice Award	West	Won	
Asian Pop Music Awards	2022	Best Music Video (Chinese)	"Veil"	Nominated	
Asian Pop Music Awards	2022	Best Collaboration (Chinese)	"Dawn to Dusk" (with 24kGoldn)	Nominated	
Asian Pop Music Awards	2022	Best Producer (Chinese)	West	Nominated	
Asian Pop Music Awards	2022	Best Male Artist (Chinese)	Lay Zhang	Nominated	
Baidu Baike Awards	2018	Model Artist of the Year	Lay Zhang	Won	
Baidu Music King Awards	2015	Best OST of the Year	"Alone"	Won	
Berlin Music Video Awards	2025	Best VFX	"开天(Kai Tian)"	Nominated	
Billboard Radio China	2017	Top 10 Chinese Songs of the Year	"Sheep"	Won	
CCTV Flowers in the May Gala	2017	Outstanding Youth Award	Lay Zhang	Won	
CCTV Flowers in the May Gala	2017	Esteemed Comradely Youth Award	Lay Zhang	Won	
CCTV Flowers in the May Gala	2018	Outstanding Youth Actor Award	Lay Zhang	Won	
China Britain Film Festival	2016	Best Supporting Actor	Ex-Files 2: The Backup Strikes Back	Won	
China Economic Publishing House	2018	National Music Industry Outstanding Award Project	Lay Zhang	Won	
China Television Drama Quality Ceremony	2017	Best All-Rounded Artist	Lay Zhang	Won	
China TV Golden Eagle Award	2020	Audience's Choice for Actor	Lay Zhang	Nominated	
China Writer's Rich List Awards	2016	Celebrity Author Award (4th Prize)	Standing Firm at 24	Won	
China Year End Awards	2020	Best Selling Album	Lit	Won	
China Year End Awards	2022	Best Selling Western Single	"Dawn to Dusk" (with 24kGoldn)	Won	
China Year End Awards	2022	Best Selling Collaboration Single	"Dawn to Dusk" (with 24kGoldn)	Won	
Chinese Golden Melody Awards	2020	Best Album	Lit	Won	
Chinese Golden Melody Awards	2020	Top 10 Chinese Records	Lit	Won	
Cosmopolitan Beauty Awards	2015	Best Beauty Idol of the Year	Lay Zhang	Won	
Douyin's Award Gala	2021	Best Music Producer of the Year	Lay Zhang	Won	
Eastern Entertainment Influence Awards	2015	Music Pioneer of the Year	Lay Zhang	Won	
ENAwards	2016	Influential Artist List	Lay Zhang	Won	
ERC Chinese Top Ten Awards	2018	Album of the Year	Lay 02 Sheep	Won	
ERC Chinese Top Ten Awards	2018	Most Popular Male Artist	Lay Zhang	Won	
ERC Chinese Top Ten Awards	2018	Producer of the Year	Lay Zhang	Won	
ERC Chinese Top Ten Awards	2019	Top Ten Gold Songs	"Namanana"	Won	
ERC Chinese Top Ten Awards	2020	Most Popular EP	Honey	Won	
ERC Chinese Top Ten Awards	2020	Best Concert	"Grand Line: The First Concert"	Won	
ERC Chinese Top Ten Awards	2020	Best Producer	Lay Zhang	Won	
ERC Chinese Top Ten Awards	2020	Asia's Most Influential Male Artist	Lay Zhang	Won	
ERC Chinese Top Ten Awards	2021	Top Ten Gold Songs	"Jade"	Won	
ERC Chinese Top Ten Awards	2021	Best Album	Lit	Won	
ERC Chinese Top Ten Awards	2021	Best Male Artist	Lay Zhang	Won	
ERC Chinese Top Ten Awards	2021	Best Producer	Lay Zhang	Won	
Esquire Man At His Best Awards	2017	Man of the Year Award	Lay Zhang	Won	
GQ Men of the Year	2020	All-Rounded Artist of the Year	Lay Zhang	Won	
Guangzhou College Student Film Festival	2018	Most Popular Supporting Actor	The Island	Won	
Huading Awards	2016	Best New Actor	Lay Zhang	Nominated	
Huading Awards	2017	Best New Actor	To Be A Better Man	Nominated	
Huading Awards	2019	Best Supporting Actor	The Island	Won	
iQIYI Scream Night Awards	2019	Asia's All Around Artist Award	Lay Zhang	Won	
iQIYI Scream Night Awards	2019	Producer of the Year	Namanana	Won	
Jinri Toutiao Awards Ceremony	2020	All-Rounded Star of the Year	Lay Zhang	Won	
LeEco Entertainment Sharing Night Ceremony	2016	Most Influential Idol Award	Lay Zhang	Won	
Macau International Movie Festival	2017	Best Supporting Actor	The Founding of an Army	Nominated	
Pop Music Gold Chart Annual Festival	2019	Best Music Arrangement of the Year	"Namanana"	Won	
QQ Music Boom Boom Awards	2020	Popular Pop Singer of the Year	Lay Zhang	Won	
QQ Music Boom Boom Awards	2020	All Around Producer of the Year	Lay Zhang	Won	
QQ Music Fusion Hip-Hop Awards	2022	Most Internationally Influential Singer	Lay Zhang	Won	
Tencent Music Entertainment Awards	2019	Top Singer Award	Lay Zhang	Won	
Tencent Music Entertainment Awards	2019	Most Popular Male Singer	Lay Zhang	Won	
Tencent Music Entertainment Awards	2019	Best Selling Digital Album of the Year	Namanana	Won	
Tencent Music Entertainment Awards	2020	Most Popular Digital Album of the Year	Lit	Won	
Tencent Video Star Awards	2017	Album of the Year	Lay 02 Sheep	Won	
The Actors of China Awards	2016	Male Actor Award	Lay Zhang	Nominated	
The Actors of China Awards	2020	Best Actor (Emerald)	Lay Zhang	Nominated	
Top China Music Billboard	2020	Best Album	Lit	Won	
Top China Music Billboard	2020	Best Producer	Lit	Nominated	
Top China Music Billboard	2020	Most Popular Song	"Lit"	Nominated	
Top China Music Billboard	2020	Most Popular Male Singer	Lay Zhang	Nominated	
Top Chinese Music Awards	2016	Best OST of the Year	"Alone"	Won	
Top Chinese Music Awards	2016	Best Newcomer Award	Lay Zhang	Won	
V Chart Awards	2016	Best Film Song of the Year	"Alone"	Won	
V Chart Awards	2017	Top Male Artist (Mainland)	Lay Zhang	Won	
V Chart Awards	2017	Best Album of the Year	Lose Control	Won	
Weibo Music Awards	2022	Recommended Singer of the Year	Lay Zhang	Won	
Weibo Music Awards	2022	Remarkable Artist of the Year	Lay Zhang	Won	
Weibo Music Awards	2022	Recommended MV of the Year	"No One Cares"	Won	
Weibo Music Awards	2022	Recommended Concert of the Year	Grandline 2: Infinite Lands	Won	
Weibo Music Awards	2022	Recommended Song of the Year	"Flying Apsaras"	Won	
Weibo Music Awards	2022	Warmest Radio Host	Lay's Moon Night Radio	Won	
Weibo Music Awards	2023	Artist of the Year	Lay Zhang	Won	
Weibo Music Awards	2023	Producer of the Year	Lay Zhang	Won	
Weibo Night Awards	2020	Weibo God	Lay Zhang	Won	
Weibo Night Awards	2020	Producer of the Year	Lay Zhang	Won	
Weibo TV Online Video Awards	2017	Most Weibo Fans Award	Lay Zhang	Won	

== Listicles ==
=== Forbes China Celebrity 100 ===
Year	Rank	Ref.
2017	20th	
2019	11th	
2020	5th	
2021	6th	
