= Obsession (Exo album) =

- Digital cover

Studio album by Exo
- Released: November 27, 2019
- Recorded: 2019
- Studios: Doobdoob (Seoul); MonoTree (Seoul); SM LVYIN (Seoul); SM SSAM (Seoul); SM Yellow Tail (Seoul)
- Genres: K-pop; hip hop; R&B
- Length: 34:08
- Languages: Korean; Mandarin; English
- Labels: SM; Dreamus

Exo chronology
Exo Planet #4 – The EℓyXiOn [dot] (2019)	Obsession (2019)	Exo Planet #5 – EXplOration (2020)

Singles from Obsession
- 1. "Obsession" Released: November 27, 2019

Obsession (stylized in all caps) is the sixth studio album by South Korean boy band Exo. It was released on November 27, 2019, by SM Entertainment. The album was released for pre-order on November 1, and is available in three versions: EXO, X-EXO, and Obsession, which was released on December 4. Obsession was Exo's first album to be promoted as a six-member group, as members Xiumin and D.O. were undergoing mandatory military service, and member Lay was promoting his solo activities in China. It is also the group's most recent album to contain a Chinese version of the lead single.

== Background and release ==
Obsession is the band's sixth Korean studio album and seventh overall. The album features 10 songs including the lead single, "Obsession". It follows the band's most recent studio album repackage Love Shot, released in December 2018. The album is the band's first release without members Xiumin and D.O., who were completing their mandatory military service.

== Songs ==
The title track "Obsession" is described as a hip hop dance song featuring repeating spell-like vocal samples and a prominent heavy beat. The album features 10 tracks in a variety of genres. "Trouble" is a dance song that contains various genre elements like trap and reggae. The lyrics are about falling for one deeply and having no exit. "Jekyll" is a dance pop song with heavy drums, 808 bass along with dynamic vocal composition and transformation. The song's lyrics express an internal conflict with one's alter ego in an impactful way. "Groove" is a song about lovers sharing affectionate feelings as if they were crossing reality & dream through dancing. The song features strings and flute instrumentation with a rhythmical chorus.

"Ya Ya Ya" is a hip hop dance song with lyrics expressing the belief that love begins in a single moment. The song has heavy 808 bass and an addictive chorus, featuring sampling from SWV's song "You're the One" (1996). "Baby You Are" is a dance pop song with a romantic vibe and elements of folk instrumentation. The lyrics tell a story about the exciting moment of love at first sight. "Non Stop" is a dance-funk song with lyrics romanticizing the unstoppable love between two people. The song features prominent brass and guitar instrumentation.

== Promotion ==
On November 29, the band held their comeback showcase titled Exo The Stage, where they performed the lead single "Obsession" for the first time.

== Accolades ==
Billboard ranked Obsession the 4th best K-pop album of 2019. MTV included "Baby You Are" in their list of the best K-pop b-sides of 2019 and BuzzFeed mentioned "Groove" in their year-end list of K-pop releases that helped defined the year.

Awards
Year	Organization	Award	Result	Ref.
2020	Gaon Chart Music Awards	Album of the Year – 4th Quarter	Won	
2020	Gaon Chart Music Awards	Top Kit Seller of the Year	Won	

== Track listing ==
Obsession track listing
No.	Title	Lyrics	Music	Arrangement	Length
1.	"Obsession"	Kenzie	Dem Jointz; Cristi "Stalone" Gallo; Asia'h Epperson; Adrian McKinnon; Yoo Young-jin; Ryan S. Jhun	Dem Jointz	3:23
2.	"Trouble"	Hwang Yoo-bin	Jin Suk Choi; Karen Poole; Bobii Lewis	Jin Suk Choi	3:17
3.	"Jekyll" (지킬; Jikil)	JQ (Makeumine Works); Kim Hye-ji (Makeumine Works); Choi Seo-eun (Makeumine Works)	Jeremy "Tay" Jasper; Kaelin Ellis; Nicky van der Lugt Melsert	Jeremy "Tay" Jasper; Kaelin Ellis; Adrian McKinnon; Jordain Johnson; Aaron Fresh; Hautboi Rich	3:41
4.	"Groove" (춤; Chum; lit. 'Dancing')	JQ (Makeumine Works); Mola (Makeumine Works)	Hyuk Shin (Joombas); Blair Taylor (Joombas); Jisoo Park (Joombas)	Joombas	3:28
5.	"Ya Ya Ya"	Kenzie	Dem Jointz; Ryan S. Jhun; David Brown; Charles "Prince Charlez" Hinshaw; Allen "Allstar" Gordon Jr.; Cheryl Gamble (SWV); Tamara Johnson (SWV); Andrea Martin; Ivan Matias	Dem Jointz	3:42
6.	"Baby You Are"	JQ (Makeumine Works); Park Ji-hee (Makeumine Works)	Wendy Wang (No Expectations); Mozella (No Expectations); Benjamin Ingrosso; Allakoi "Mic Holden" Peete	No Expectations	2:58
7.	"Non Stop"	Jo Yoon-kyung	Daniel "Obi" Klein; Charli Taft; Andreas Öberg	Daniel "Obi" Klein	3:24
8.	"Day After Day" (오늘도; Oneuldo)	Jo Yoon-kyung	Mike Daley; Mitchell Owens; Deez; Jeff Lewis	Mike Daley; Mitchell Owens; Deez; Jeff Lewis	3:42
9.	"Butterfly Effect" (나비효과; Nabihyogwa)	Lee Seu-ran	LDN Noise; Adrian McKinnon	LDN Noise	3:10
10.	"Obsession" (嗜) (Chinese version))	Arys Chien	Dem Jointz; Cristi "Stalone" Gallo; Asia'h Epperson; Adrian McKinnon; Yoo Young-jin; Ryan S. Jhun	Dem Jointz	3:23
Total length:					34:15

Notes

- "Ya Ya Ya" contains a sample of "You're the One" performed by SWV.

== Charts ==
=== Weekly charts ===
Chart (2019)	Peak position
Australian Digital Albums (ARIA)	22
Belgian Albums (Ultratop Flanders)	124
Belgian Albums (Ultratop Wallonia)	89
Japanese Albums (Oricon)	16
Japanese Hot Albums (Billboard Japan)	20
Lithuanian Albums (AGATA)	72
South Korean Albums (Gaon)	1
UK Album Downloads (Official Charts)	37
UK Independent Albums (Official Charts)	33
US Billboard 200	182
US Independent Albums (Billboard)	5
US World Albums (Billboard)	1

=== Year-end charts ===
Chart (2019)	Position
South Korean Albums (Gaon)	3

== Certifications and sales ==
Certifications and sales for Obsession
Region	Certification	Certified units/sales
China	—	354,535
Japan	—	24,275
South Korea (KMCA)	3× Platinum	843,305
United States	—	25,000

== Release history ==
Country	Date	Format	Label
South Korea	November 27, 2019	CD; digital download; streaming	SM; Dreamus
United States	November 27, 2019	CD; digital download; streaming	SM; Dreamus; Alliance Entertainment
Various	November 27, 2019	Digital download; streaming	SM Entertainment
