= Don't Fight the Feeling =

2021 EP by Exo

- Digital cover

EP by Exo
- Released: June 7, 2021
- Recorded: 2021
- Studio: 21A (Beijing); Doobdoob (Seoul); Dream Factory (Seoul); SM Big Shot (Seoul); SM LVYIN (Seoul); SM SSAM (Seoul); SM Yellow Tail (Seoul); Sound Pool (Seoul)
- Genre: K-pop; R&B; dance
- Length: 17:09
- Language: Korean; English
- Label: SM; Dreamus
- Producer: Lee Soo-man; Tha Aristocrats; Brandon Arreaga; Skylar Mones; Andreas Öberg; Rice n' Peas; Vendors

Exo chronology
Exo Planet #5 – Exploration (2020)	Don't Fight the Feeling (2021)	Exist (2023)

Singles from Don't Fight the Feeling
- 1. "Don't Fight the Feeling" Released: June 7, 2021

Don't Fight the Feeling is the seventh EP by South Korean–Chinese boy band Exo. It was released by SM Entertainment on June 7, 2021, and marketed as a "special album" and a gift for fans. The album marks the group's first new material since their 2019 studio album Obsession, and features the return of members Xiumin, Lay, and D.O. since Don't Mess Up My Tempo (2018). Don't Fight the Feeling topped the Gaon Album Chart and has sold over one million copies, the sixth among Exo's albums to have reached this milestone.

== Background and release ==
In mid-2020, two Exo members–Chen and Suho–went on hiatus to enlist for their mandatory military service. A few months later, two previously enlisted members–Xiumin and D.O.–who had been inactive since the group's fifth studio album Don't Mess Up My Tempo (2018), were discharged and resumed activities with the group. On April 8, 2021, nine years since Exo's debut date, the group uploaded a video in which active members–Xiumin, Chanyeol, Baekhyun, D.O., Kai, and Sehun–commemorated the anniversary and revealed that they have been preparing for their next release.

On May 10, Exo announced the release of a "special album" titled Don't Fight the Feeling. Beginning on May 24, futuristic promotional images and videos for the EP were gradually released. On May 26, Lay, who had also been inactive since Don't Mess Up My Tempo, was announced to have participated on the project. Lay did not meet up with the members at any point working on the album as a result of the COVID-19 pandemic. On June 7, Don't Fight the Feeling and the music video for the title track were released simultaneously.

Don't Fight the Feeling contains five tracks including the title track, which was described as a dance song with a "cheerful rhythm". Physically, the EP was released in four editions, including two photobook editions, a jewel case edition, and an Expansion edition. The Expansion edition itself has six versions, each featuring one of the participating members–minus Lay–on the cover.

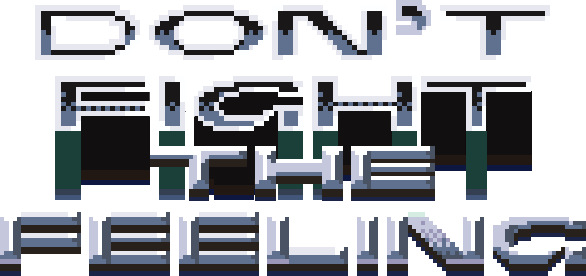
Album title logo with a 8-bit style used in albums and merches

== Commercial performance ==
Prior to its release, Don't Fight the Feeling received 1.2 million pre-orders within a 27-day period, breaking Exo's previous personal record of 1.1 million with Don't Mess Up My Tempo (2018). On June 14, eight days after being released, the album was announced to have sold over one million copies, surpassing Don't Mess Up My Tempo–which took ten days to do so–to become Exo's fastest-selling album. This is the group's sixth album to have crossed the one million sales mark.

Don't Fight the Feeling debuted at number one on the Gaon Album Chart. In Japan, it peaked at number three on the Oricon Albums Chart, and at number six on the Billboard Japan Hot Albums chart. In the US, the album debuted at number eight on the Billboard World Albums chart.

== Track listing ==
Don't Fight the Feeling track listing
No.	Title	Lyrics	Music	Arrangement	Length
1.	"Don't Fight the Feeling"	Kenzie	Mike Jiminez; Damon Thomas; Tesung Kim (Iconic Sound); Tha Aristocrats; Tiyon "TC" Mack; Moon Kim	Tha Aristocrats	2:56
2.	"Paradise" (Korean: 파라다이스; RR: Paradaiseu)	Brandon Arreaga; Edwin Honoret; Jake Torrey; Michael Matosic	Brandon Arreaga; Edwin Honoret; Jake Torrey; Michael Matosic	Brandon Arreaga	3:37
3.	"No Matter" (Korean: 훅!; RR: Huk!)	Mok Ji-min (lalala Studio)	Skylar Mones; Andreas Öberg; Patrick Hartman	Skylar Mones; Andreas Öberg	3:42
4.	"Runaway"	Seo Ji-eum	Kevin White (Rice n' Peas); Mike Woods (Rice n' Peas); Andrew Bazzi (Rice n' Peas)	Rice n' Peas	3:27
5.	"Just as Usual" (Korean: 지켜줄게; RR: Jikyeojulge; lit. I'll Protect You)	Thama (Devine Channel)	San (Vendors); Fascinador (Vendors); Zenur (Vendors); Shaquille Rayes	Vendors	3:27
Total length:					17:09

== Charts ==
=== Weekly charts ===
Chart performance for Don't Fight the Feeling
Chart (2021)	Peak position
Finnish Albums (Suomen virallinen lista)	39
Hungarian Albums (MAHASZ)	29
Japanese Albums (Oricon)	3
Japan Hot Albums (Billboard Japan)	6
Polish Albums (ZPAV)	27
South Korean Albums (Gaon)	1
US World Albums (Billboard)	8

=== Year-end charts ===
Year-end chart performance for Don't Fight the Feeling
Chart (2021)	Position
Japanese Albums (Oricon)	85
South Korean Albums (Gaon)	7

== Certifications and sales ==
Certifications and sales for Don't Fight the Feeling
Region	Certification	Certified units/sales
China	—	503,481
Japan	—	49,184
South Korea (KMCA)	Million	1,326,189

=== Critical reception ===
Professional ratings
Review scores
Source	Rating
NME	4/5 stars

== Accolades ==
Accolades for "Don't Fight the Feeling"
Song	Program	Date
"Don't Fight the Feeling"	Music Bank (KBS)	June 18, 2021

== Release history ==
Release history and formats for Don't Fight the Feeling
Region	Date	Format	Label
South Korea	June 7, 2021	CD; digital download; streaming	SM; Dreamus
Various	June 7, 2021	Digital download; streaming	SM; Dreamus
Various	October 25, 2021	LP	SM; Dreamus
