= The Joel Streeter Band =

- Genres: Pop rock, acoustic rock
- Years active: 2005-present
- Labels: Self-Released
- Members: Joel Streeter; Max Delaney; Jerry Becker; Jeff Symonds; Kyle Caprista

The Joel Streeter Band is a band led by American singer-songwriter Joel Streeter. Streeter began recording in 2005 and is the founder, writer, composer, guitarist, and vocalist. The Joel Streeter Band has featured a constantly changing line-up of musicians, with Streeter being the only constant. When performing live, the band commonly comprises Joel Steeter backed by Max Delaney on electric guitar, Jerry Becker on keyboard, Jeff Symonds on bass, and Kyle Caprista on drums.

== History ==
In 2005, Streeter began performing under the name The Joel Streeter Band in San Francisco, California. Their first album Hear Me Out was self-released in 2006 with Jerry Becker. Bay Area radio station KFOG took note of the album, placing the song "Stay Living" on their Local Scene - Volume 4 compilation, and playing the song frequently since the summer of 2007. Tracks from Hear Me Out were also featured in the 2008 season of PBS's popular television program Roadtrip Nation.

Streeter's second album, Matador, was released in 2010. The album was again produced by Jerry Becker and features many notable Bay Area musicians including drummer Jim Bogios, a member of Counting Crows.

The Joel Streeter Band is an active member of The San Francisco Songwriters Coalition.

== Members ==
- Joel Streeter - Vocals, Guitar
- Max Delaney - Electric Guitar
- Jerry Becker - Keyboard
- Jeff Symonds - Bass
- Kyle Caprista - Drums

== Discography ==
- Hear Me Out (2006)
- Matador (2010)
