= Hear Me Out (Exo song) =

Single by Exo

from the album Exist
- Language: Korean; English
- Released: June 30, 2023
- Recorded: 2023
- Studio: SM Big Shot (Seoul); Doobdoob (Seoul); Sound Pool (Seoul)
- Genre: R&B
- Length: 3:24
- Label: SM; Kakao
- Composers: Jeremy "Tay" Jasper; Tavaughn Young; Adrian McKinnon; George Carroll; Sade Munirah Emsweller; Grades; Yakob; Jack Ro; Scribz Riley; Riley (PRS); Steve Octave
- Lyricists: Park Ji-hyun (ARTieffect); Kim Dong-hyun
- Producers: Grades; Yakob; Jack Rochon; Scribz Riley; Tave

Exo singles chronology
"Let Me In" (2023)	"Hear Me Out" (2023)	"Cream Soda" (2023)

Music video
- "Hear Me Out" on YouTube

"Hear Me Out" is a song by South Korean–Chinese boy band Exo, released on June 30, 2023, by SM Entertainment as the second single from their seventh studio album, Exist. The song features the vocals of Exo's eight active members, including Kai who enlisted as a public service worker shortly before the song's release.

== Background ==
"Hear Me Out" is the second pre-release track for Exo's seventh studio album, Exist. The track was announced for the time on the group's Twitter account outlining the comeback schedule for the album. The song was scheduled to be released on June 30, 2023, following the release of "Let Me In" on June 12.

On June 26, the band released the first teaser image for the upcoming release on their social media accounts by releasing concept images of members Xiumin, Baekhyun, and Chanyeol. Two days later, the band tweeted the full teaser image showing all the eight members. The song was released digitally on June 30, along with its music video.

== Composition ==
"Hear Me Out" is classified as an R&B song with an old-school sound. The song was composed by Jeremy “Tay” Jasper, Tavaughn Young, Adrian Mckinnon, George Carroll, Sade Munirah, Grade, Yakob, Jack Rochon, and Michael Orabiyi. It was then arranged by Grades, Yakob, Rochon, Scribz Riley, and Jeremy "Tay" Jasper. The lyrics were penned by Park Ji-hyun (ARTiffect) and Kim Dong-hyun, pertaining genuine emotions to a person who is apprehensive before falling in love.

== Music video ==
The music video shows the members lounging at home, and going on a leisure trip together to a bowling alley. Two days after the music video release, the group uploaded the behind-the-scenes film of making the music video on their YouTube channel. On August 12, the group uploaded the second behind-the-scenes film, this time taking the audience into their recording process of the song.

== Live performances ==
"Hear Me Out" was performed live for the first time during the group's "2024 Exo Fan Meeting: One" on April 14, 2024, celebrating their 12th anniversary.

== Credits and personnel ==
Credits adapted from the album's liner notes and Spotify.

=== Studio ===
- Sound Pool Studio – recording
- SM Big Shot Studio – recording
- Doobdoob Studio – recording, digital editing
- SM SSAM Studio – engineered for mix
- SM Blue Cup Studio – mixing
- 821 Sound – mastering

=== Personnel ===
- SM Entertainment – executive producer
- Jang Cheol-hyuk – executive supervisor
- Exo – vocals
- Scribz Riley – producer, composition, arrangement
- TAVE – producer, composition, arrangement
- Grades – producer, composition, arrangement
- Jakob Rabitsch (Yakob) – producer, composition, arrangement
- Jack Rochon – producer, composition, arrangement
- Park Ji-hyun (ARTieffect) – lyrics
- Kim Dong-hyun – lyrics
- Jeremy "Tay" Jasper – composition
- Tavaughn Young – composition
- Adrian McKinnon – composition
- George Carroll – composition
- Sade Munirah Emsweller – composition
- Steve Octave – composition
- Ju Chan-yang (Pollen) – vocal directing, background vocals
- Kim Hyo-joon – recording
- Eugene Kwon – recording, digital editing
- Jeong Ho-jin – recording
- On Seong-yoon – recording
- Kang Eun-ji – engineered for mix
- Jung Eui-seok – mixing
- Kwon Nam-woo – mastering

== Charts ==
=== Weekly charts ===
Weekly chart performance for "Hear Me Out"
Chart (2023)	Peak position
South Korea (Circle)	124
South Korea (Billboard)	5
US World Digital Songs (Billboard)	5
Vietnam (Vietnam Hot 100)	88

=== Monthly charts ===
Monthly chart performance for "Hear Me Out"
Chart (2023)	Peak position
South Korea (Circle)	170

== Release history ==
Release history for "Hear Me Out"
Region	Date	Format	Label
Various	June 30, 2023	Digital download; streaming	SM; Kakao

== See also ==
- Exo discography
- List of songs recorded by Exo
