= Hear Me Out (TV series) =

- Chinese: 有话要说
- Genre: Info-ed; Talkshow
- Presented by: Bryan Wong; DJ Lin Peifen
- Country of origin: Singapore
- Original language: Mandarin
- No. of seasons: 4
- No. of episodes: 22

Production
- Executive producer: Christopher Yeo 杨鸣侃
- Production location: Caldecott Broadcast Centre Studio 4
- Running time: 60 minutes

Original release
- Network: Mediacorp Channel 8
- Release: December 7, 2014 – February 25, 2018

Hear Me Out (Chinese: 有话要说) is an info-ed programme produced by Channel 8 News & Current Affairs Department. It is hosted by popular host Bryan Wong and YES 933 FM DJ Lin Peifen.

== Background ==
Hear Me Out is an infotainment TV talk show. Six notable guests from various sectors are invited to the programme to discuss about their work, and hear their insights into our life and times.

== Episodes ==
=== Series overview ===
Season	Episodes	Originally released	
Season	Episodes	First released	Last released
1	6	December 7, 2014	January 18, 2015
2	6	February 21, 2016	March 27, 2016
3	5	February 5, 2017	March 5, 2016
4	5	February 25, 2018	April 1, 2018

=== Season 1 (2014–2015) ===
No. overall	No. in series	Guest	Original release date
1	1	Teo Siong Seng	December 7, 2014
2	2	Lim Swee Say	December 14, 2014
3	3	George Quek	December 21, 2014
4	4	Jack Neo	December 28, 2014
5	5	Ng Ser Miang	January 11, 2015
6	6	Josephine Teo	January 18, 2015

=== Season 2 (2016) ===
No. overall	No. in series	Guest	Original release date
7	1	Lim Hock Chee	February 21, 2016
8	2	Royston Tan	February 28, 2016
9	3	Tin Pei Ling	March 6, 2016
10	4	Tsung Yeh	March 13, 2016
11	5	Liu Thai Ker	March 20, 2016
12	6	Chan Chun Sing	March 27, 2016

=== Season 3 (2017) ===
No. overall	No. in series	Guest	Original release date
13	1	Kit Chan	February 5, 2017
14	2	Sam Goi	February 12, 2017
15	3	Chen Shucheng	February 19, 2017
16	4	Chia Yong Yong	February 26, 2017
17	5	Ong Ye Kung	March 5, 2017

=== Season 4 (2018) ===
No. overall	No. in series	Guest(s)	Original release date
18	1	Lee Wei Song & Lee Si Song	February 25, 2018
19	2	Toh Soon Huat	March 4, 2018
20	3	Fan Dong Kai	March 11, 2018
21	4	Justin Quek	March 25, 2018
22	5	Ng Chee Meng	April 1, 2018

== Accolades ==
Organisation	Year	Category	Nominee(s)	Result	Ref.
Star Awards	2015	Best Info-Ed Programme Host	Bryan Wong	Nominated	

== See also ==
- Mediacorp Channel 8
- Channel 8 News
