= Arys Chien =

Producer, songwriter and arrange

Arys Chien (born 1972) is a producer, songwriter and arranger in the Chinese music industry. He is also involved in soundtrack production, recording and mixing. Currently, he produces commercial and film soundtracks in Deepwhite Studio, and handles recording and mixing in Little White Fish Studio. Arys also co-owns a record label A Whiter Day Music, which distributes work for independent artists. In addition, he still releases music as a member in the duo “Deepwhite".

== Career ==
=== Early career ===
After graduating from the Department of Foreign Languages and Literatures at National Taiwan University in 1995, Arys joined Friendly Dog Entertainment as a production assistant. Since 1996, Arys Chien, Junyang Chen and Hua Chen began releasing work under the same pseudonym "Deepwhite", with parenthesis behind to include their English for distinguishing one person from another. For example, Arys Chien's work was signed as "Deepwhite (Arys Chien)".

Since 1997, Arys's works have been selected multiple times for singers under record companies such as Linfair Records, What’s Music International Corp., and Warner Chappell Music. The artists include William Wing Hong So, Kelly Chen, IPIS, Where Chou, Chin Chyi, Valen Hsu, Power Station, Denise Yuen, Miriam Yeung, Sammi Cheng, Stefanie Sun, Na Ying, etc.

In 2005, Arys and his girlfriend Zoe Huang formed the duo "Deepwhite" under Avex Trax, and released two original albums in 2006 and 2007. After the end of their contract with Avex in 2008, Arysserved as the music director in Enjoy Records until 2010, and then resumed to be a freelance songwriter.

=== Songwriter and producer ===
Arys has written lyrics or compositions for over 400 songs so far, including albums by singers like A-Mei, Kelly Chen, Sammi Cheng, Faye Wong, Stefanie Sun, Angela Zhang, Christine Fan, Na Ying, William So, Joey Yung, Rene Liu, Elva Hsiao, Rachel Liang, Chin Chyi, Eason Chan, Gigi Leung, Kay Tse, Terry Lin, Faye Wong, Kitty Chan, etc. In addition, Arys has also written Chinese lyrics for many Korean idol groups, such as Exo, NCT Dream, Pentagon and so on.

As for music production, Arys has produced singles or albums for many singers, such as Where Chou, Xian Zi, Sasha Li, Bii, Andrew Tan, Miu Chu, Vivian Hsu, Leheane Palray, Megan Lai, Celest Chong, Chris Ke, Sunny Lin, etc.

In addition to songwriting in the pop music industry, Arys also produces soundtracks for commercials. He now has accumulated more than 200 works including Hennessy's 2014 commercial song “Wo Yuan Xiang Xin 我願相信", JD.com, 7-ELEVEN, HNCB’s annual single “Shou Hu Ni De Chu Zhong 守護你的初衷", Shinkong Mitsukoshi x World Order, McDonald's 2017 single “Power to the M 超麥力", Nike, Toyota, Ford, Nissan, Lexus, Johnson & Johnson Beijing Olympics, CCTV Spring Festival Gala, UnionPay, etc.

His film soundtrack works include “Do You Love Me As I Love You 可不可以，你也剛好喜歡我" in 2020, “Zui Xing 罪‧形" in 2019, Hsien Yung Pai's biography documentary “Multiflorate Splendour 奼紫嫣紅開遍" in 2015, “Return Ticket 到阜陽六百里" in 2011, etc.

=== Performing career ===
Around 2000, Arys asked his girlfriend to sing a demo for him, and several record labels have shown interest in signing them. Thus, the two formed a singer-songwriter group “Deepwhite”, and signed a contract with Avex Trax in 2005. They released two albums,”Deepwhite" in 2006 and “Hua Huo 花火" in 2007.

Other than Deepwhite, Arys also participates as the guitarist and main songwriter in other bands like "GooDDD" and “Ouch Youths".

=== Entrepreneurship ===
In 2017, Arys and KKFARM (now theFARM) jointly established an independent label "A Whiter Day Music". In 2020, he produced and released the new song "Cold Fire" for "Deepwhite", and also produced and released the work of the hip-hop duo Fun Ones. Fun Ones separated at the end of 2020, but one of the vocals Zing stayed in the label and continues to release new songs in 2021.

=== Public affairs ===
Arys actively participates in organizations that help protect the rights and interests of Taiwanese musicians. In addition to serving as a committee member of the Music Creators Union, Arys works closely with ARCO. He has also served as the panel judge for Golden Melody Awards and the Golden Music Awards, as well as the committee member for various funding projects in the Ministry of Culture.

== Artistry ==
Arys has his expertise in commercial love songs and allegro songs, especially songs illustrating deeper emotions. Before his true identity was revealed, many people speculated that “Deepwhite” was a female songwriter. He once encouraged young talents to build a lot of emotions, but give and express them very carefully. For example, a piece of lyrics is very concise and condensed in one or two hundred words, yet there are thousands of messages hidden behind them. Writing lyrics is about accumulating, sorting and finally expressing all the thoughts and feelings in words.

== Works ==
Song	Artist	Released	Production	Arrangement	Recording	Mixing
2021						
Protect Me From Myself	DeepWhite	5/14/2021	✓	✓	✓	✓
一步一步來	Zing	4/20/2021	✓	✓ (partial)	✓	✓
DO or NOT (Chinese lyrics)	Pentagon	4/5/2021				
我我我我我愛妳	Zing	3/16/2021	✓	✓ (partial)	✓	✓
All Pain No Gain	DeepWhite	3/5/2021	✓	✓	✓	✓
2020						
Cold Fire	DeepWhite	12/22/2020	✓	✓	✓	✓
你不單身誰單身	Fun Ones	11/11/2020	✓	✓	✓	✓
躺到廢（HIGH）	Fun Ones	1/24/2020	✓		✓	✓
躺到廢（LOW）	Fun Ones	1/24/2020	✓	✓	✓	✓
2019						
黑夜日出	WayV	10/29/2019				
訊號	Kuan-lin Lai	7/27/2019				
525 我愛我	DeepWhite	5/25/2019	✓	✓	✓	✓
薛丁格的愛	Luji	4/12/2019		✓		✓
Together!(English)	Various artists	1/2/2019	✓	✓	✓	✓
2018						
Together!(Chinese)	Various artists	12/21/2018	✓	✓	✓	✓
節奏	EXO	11/3/2018				
We Young(Chinese)	EXO	9/14/2018				
做自己的太陽	Kelly Chen	7/20/2018				
2017						
All About You	DeepWhite & Jierui Chen	12/4/2017	✓	✓	✓	✓
模糊	Chyi Chin	11/30/2017				
願	Chyi Chin	11/30/2017				
迷路	Chyi Chin	7/25/2017				
可愛可惡 (Chinese lyrics)	EXO	7/18/2017				
叩叩趴 (Chinese lyrics)	EXO	7/18/2017				
重逢之日 (Chinese lyrics)	Cho Gyu-hyun	5/24/2017				
超.麥.力(Power to the M)	McDonald's	5/7/2017	✓	✓	✓	✓
Smile	DeepWhite	4/7/2017	✓	✓	✓	✓
Latte 妳要去哪裡	DeepWhite	4/7/2017	✓	✓	✓	✓
躲貓貓	DeepWhite	4/7/2017	✓	✓	✓	✓
一直醒來看妳的平靜夜裡	DeepWhite	4/7/2017	✓	✓	✓	✓
再來一遍	DeepWhite	4/7/2017	✓	✓	✓	✓
新手爸爸的午夜悲歌	DeepWhite	4/7/2017	✓	✓	✓	✓
小石的牙齒	DeepWhite	4/7/2017	✓	✓	✓	✓
無尾熊	DeepWhite	4/7/2017	✓	✓	✓	✓
妳很好。努力剛好就好。	DeepWhite	4/7/2017	✓	✓	✓	✓
My Child	DeepWhite	4/7/2017	✓	✓	✓	✓
最後的初戀 (Chinese lyrics)	NCT Dream	2/8/2017				
2016						
I Love You Bon Bon	Jiajia	12/30/2016				
Chewing Gum (Chinese lyrics)	NCT Dream	8/27/2016				
Lucky One (Chinese lyrics)	EXO	6/8/2016				
新手爸爸之午夜悲歌	DeepWhite	2/7/2016	✓	✓	✓	✓
2015						
Perfect Imperfection	DeepWhite	12/31/2015	✓	✓	✓	✓
魯蛇	Da Mouth	5/8/2015				
頭殼壞去	GooDDD	4/10/2015	✓	✓ (partial)	✓	✓
是我	Megan Lai	3/27/2015	✓	✓	✓	✓
剛才	Megan Lai	3/27/2015	✓	✓	✓	✓
刺蝟的擁抱	Cindy Yen	2/6/2015				
2014						
幸福的孤單	Sasha Lee	12/31/2014	✓	✓	✓	✓
困獸	Ouch Youths	12/30/2014	✓	✓	✓	✓
狗	Amei	7/2/2014				
靜護 demo	Ouch Youths	4/26/2014	✓	✓	✓	✓
2013						
不置可否	Jiajia	12/31/2013				
分手藝術	Andrew Tan	10/18/2013	✓	✓		
When You're With Me	Sunny Lin	8/9/2013	✓	✓	✓	
Hey Hey	Sunny Lin	8/9/2013	✓	✓	✓	
Can't Stop	Rene Liu	5/10/2013				
相愛的模樣	Miu Chu	3/28/2013	✓	✓		
出愛情記	Miu Chu	3/28/2013	✓	✓		
女神	Miu Chu	3/28/2013				
2012						
好想愛	MIXION	11/16/2012	✓	✓	✓	✓
Move On	MIXION	11/16/2012	✓	✓	✓	✓
愛你為什麼	MIXION	11/16/2012	✓	✓	✓	✓
心電感應	Fish Leung	8/10/2012				
目送	Shara Lin	8/6/2012	✓	✓	✓	
公主沒病	Shara Lin	8/6/2012				
喔 是嗎	Shara Lin	8/6/2012	✓	✓	✓	
2011						
我要去旅行	Xian Zi	11/23/2011	✓	✓		
咖啡季節	Where Chou	10/18/2011	✓	✓	✓	
幸福的可能	Where Chou	10/18/2011	✓		✓	
冰塊	Where Chou	10/18/2011	✓			
我會努力	Linda Liao	5/27/2011	✓	✓	✓	✓
2010						
給我你的手	Xian Zi	4/8/2010	✓			
你是你的	Xian Zi	4/8/2010	✓	✓		
微光	Kelly Chen	3/16/2010				
雨天	Kelly Chen	3/16/2010				
2009						
Come to Me	Ariel Lin	8/21/2009		✓		
2008						
Dry Your Eyes	Leheane Palray	12/12/2008	✓		✓	
2007						
New Beginning	DeepWhite	12/28/2007	✓	✓	✓	✓
香草的天空	DeepWhite	12/28/2007	✓	✓	✓	✓
Cold Silence	DeepWhite	12/28/2007	✓	✓	✓	✓
花火	DeepWhite	12/28/2007	✓	✓	✓	✓
過得比你好	DeepWhite	12/28/2007	✓	✓	✓	✓
理智的溫柔	DeepWhite	12/28/2007	✓	✓	✓	✓
剪影	DeepWhite	12/28/2007	✓	✓	✓	✓
狂奔	DeepWhite	12/28/2007	✓	✓	✓	✓
別說	DeepWhite	12/28/2007	✓	✓	✓	✓
Thank You	DeepWhite	12/28/2007	✓	✓	✓	✓
絕不	Angela Chang	4/30/2007				
2006						
永遠的愚人	Joi Chua	9/18/2006				
那個人	DeepWhite	2/17/2006	✓	✓	✓	
悄悄話	DeepWhite	2/17/2006	✓	✓	✓	
魚在水裡哭	DeepWhite	2/17/2006	✓	✓	✓	
Help Me I'm in Love	DeepWhite	2/17/2006	✓	✓	✓	
還能不能	DeepWhite	2/17/2006	✓	✓	✓	
I'm Crying	DeepWhite	2/17/2006	✓	✓	✓	
記憶森林	DeepWhite	2/17/2006	✓	✓	✓	
Nothing Wrong	DeepWhite	2/17/2006	✓	✓	✓	
邊緣	DeepWhite	2/17/2006	✓	✓	✓	
That's Me	DeepWhite	2/17/2006	✓	✓	✓	
真的	Angela Chang	1/6/2006				
2005						
一直到最後	Christine Fan	6/3/2005				
傷心簽名	Yee-ling Huang	3/4/2005				
離開	Bella	1/7/2005				
2004						
眼淚沒有用	Richie Ren	12/31/2004				
時差	Celest Chong	12/10/2004				
直線	Angela Chang	12/3/2004				
黑暗時期	Energy	7/9/2004				
一直到最後	Energy	7/9/2004				
剛好的不夠	Melody Liu	6/28/2004				
吶喊	Angela Chang	1/6/2004				
2003						
You & I	Ambrose Hui	11/7/2003				
孤單旅行	Sun Ho	10/17/2003				
揮之不去	Melody Liu	9/26/2003		✓		
你太誠實	S.H.E.	8/22/2003				
我為什麼那麼愛你	Amei	7/1/2003				
我就是我	Elva Hsiao	5/16/2003				
愛情 無關是非	Where Chou	2/14/2003				
2002						
那又怎麼樣呢	Celest Chong	12/31/2002	✓			
讓我自己 自由	Celest Chong	12/31/2002	✓			
騙子	Kiki Ting	12/24/2002				
單純	Sun Ho	12/9/2002				
一切都變了	Na Ying	11/7/2002				
永恆的轉眼	Valen Hsu	11/1/2002				
瞬間	Where Chou	8/28/2002		✓		
別在我離開你之前離開我	Maggie Chiang	7/12/2002				
一輩子的孤單	Rene Liu	6/21/2002				
有你就夠了	Coco Lee	6/18/2002				
戰爭	William So Wing Hong	5/30/2002				
懂事	Stefanie Sun	5/21/2002				
驀然	E-Jun Lee	5/14/2002				
邊緣	Gigi Leung	1/9/2002				
2001						
說真的	Joey Yung	12/6/2001				
為什麼	Makiyo	12/1/2001		✓		
因為你沒說	Amei	10/29/2001				
心路 (Cantonese)	Faye Wong	10/18/2001				
有時愛情徒有虛名	Faye Wong	10/18/2001				
像我這樣的情人	Na Ying	9/14/2001				
無疾而終	Shino Lin	8/1/2001				
如果愛	Christine Fan	8/1/2001				
完整	Sammi Cheng	5/8/2001				
When The Morning Comes	Sammi Cheng	5/8/2001				
擦肩而過	yuki	4/19/2001				
星座	yuki	4/19/2001				
你知不知道	IPIS	1/12/2001				
2000						
害怕	Stefanie Sun	12/9/2000		✓		
想妳想瘋了	B.A.D	12/5/2000				
愛，愛； 愛。	Beauty 4	11/21/2000				
緊握你的手	Daniel Chan	11/9/2000				
事到如今	Where Chou	9/19/2000				
沒有你	Where Chou	9/19/2000				
相遇太早	Where Chou	9/19/2000				
Ladies First	Sammi Cheng	8/23/2000				
手套情書	Kit Chan	6/15/2000				
Little By Little	Valen Hsu	5/19/2000				
沉默的縱容	Sammi Cheng	5/6/2000				
相遇太早	William So Wing Hong	5/1/2000				
打呵欠	Kelly Chen	4/19/2000				
你若是真愛我	Kelly Chen	4/19/2000				
1999						
Yes, I Love You	Power Station	12/8/1999				
貝殼	Vivian Hsu	11/18/1999				
失戀日記	Miriam Yeung	11/11/1999				
不回昨天	Miriam Yeung	11/11/1999				
三秒鐘	Various Artists	10/15/1999				
變天	Kit Chan	8/20/1999				
絕情	Jeff Chang	7/17/1999				
無悔	Amei	6/8/1999				
我不快樂	Sammi Cheng	5/7/1999				
幫個忙	IPIS	4/1/1999				
1998						
All Your Hearts	Valen Hsu	12/8/1998				
That Night We	Terry Lin	12/8/1998				
Said Goodbye						
放手	Terry Lin	12/8/1998				
三秒鐘	Kelly Chen	12/3/1998				
So Nice	William So Wing Hong	10/16/1998				
抱歉讓妳愛上我	Jordan Chan	9/1/1998				
Good Morning,	IPIS	6/4/1998				
Good Afternoon						
and Good Night						
遊戲	IPIS	6/4/1998				
失戀中請勿打擾	IPIS	6/4/1998				
結局	Chyi Chin	3/15/1998				
1997						
Taipei City	Eason Chan	10/1/1997				
邂逅	VA	1/15/1997				
不知如何是好	VA	1/15/1997				
1996						
當愛來的時候	Tom Pan	9/30/1996				
空白	Emi Lee	7/5/1996				
