= Baidu Music =

Chinese music streaming service

- Developer: Baidu
- Platform: Cross-platform
- Availability: China
- Website: music.baidu.com

Baidu Music is a Chinese music streaming service by Baidu. By December 2015, it had 150 million monthly active users.

== History ==
In July 2011, Baidu announced a landmark agreement for the distribution of digital music with One-Stop China (OSC), a joint venture whose shareholders include three leading global record companies: Universal Music, Warner Music, and Sony Music. OSC will license their catalogues and upcoming releases to Baidu, including both Chinese and international tracks, which can be streamed and downloaded from Baidu's servers. The terms of the deal include remunieration on a per-play and per-download basis for all tracks and was seen as a move to legitimatise digital music business in China while clamping down on piracy issues that have plagued the Chinese market for years.

In December 2015, Baidu announced that they merged Baidu Music with the record company Taihe Music Group, which owned the copyrights to 700,000 at the time and had licenses with overseas record labels; this merger allowed Baidu to include more songs within their streaming service. In May 2017, James Lu left Baidu Music.

In June 2018, Taihe Group’s Baidu Music has rebranded as Qianqian Music (千千音乐) with a new logo and domain while functions within the website and application remains the same. Concurrently, Taihe Group also secured a USD154 million investment in a fundraising round as it ramps up efforts to regain market share in the music-streaming industry now dominated by tech firms like Tencent. This was followed by a move to take up stake in NetEase Music, a unit of gaming giant NetEase Inc., in October of the same year.

== Copyright infringement ==
In 2008, record companies Universal Music, as well as the Hong Kong divisions of Sony BMG Music Entertainment, and Warner Bros. Records, brought Baidu to court in China for allegedly linking to unauthorized copies of music with their music search engine.

The record companies lost the case. Later, in the year of 2011, Baidu signed contracts with record companies that allowed them to receive compensation when a user downloads or streams a song; advertisements on the service's website helped pay for the songs' licensing fees without making Baidu's music search engine a paid-to-use service.
