= Asia'h Epperson =

American singer and actress

- Born: Asia'h Epperson; August 20, 1988 (age 38); Joplin, Missouri, U.S.
- Occupations: Actress; singer
- Years active: 2008–present
- Musical career
- Genres: Pop; R&B
- Instrument: Vocals
- Label: Def Jam

Asia'h Epperson (born August 20, 1988) is an American singer and actress. Most notable as a semi-finalist in the seventh season of American Idol, for her role as Felicia's friend in the 2015 film Straight Outta Compton, and as Tasha Skanks in the television series Greenleaf.

== Early life ==
Asia'h Epperson was born August 20, 1988, a Joplin, Missouri native. She has a younger brother and sister. Asia’h started writing music at the age of 6. Singing became a source of great happiness for her and she did it wherever she could including school, home, and church. Asia'h was a cheerleader while she attended Joplin High School, and won a regional talent competition.

== Career ==
Epperson's career began with American Idol when she was 19 years old after she moved to Atlanta. Asia’h Epperson caught the attention of the judges during her Atlanta audition, where she sang a tribute to her father, who died two days before in an auto accident. After American Idol she got signed with DefJam and began working with iconic producers Kenneth "Babyface" Edmunds and L.A. Reid. She became a part of the original cast of the musical Hair Show alongside music legend Chaka Khan in 2011. Three weeks before her first musical showcase and release, she was in a devastating car accident injuring a lung, kidney, spleen, breaking her jaw, pelvis, nine ribs, and multiple vertebrae. Her mouth was also wired shut to help her heal. As a result her music career was placed on hold. While healing she continued to pursue her career by meeting a manager and began going to auditions, securing her first guest star role on TNT's Murder in the First. She then went on to play Felicia in the 2015 film Straight Outta Compton.

Epperson then landed her role as Tasha Skanks in Greenleaf. In 2018, she played as Bobby Brown's former girlfriend, Kim Ward in the biopic The Bobby Brown Story. Epperson has stated that she enjoys her role as Tasha Stanks stating about her character, "She’s a good woman but on a assignment to do a lot of not good things." Pertaining to Tasha Skanks' character of Greenleaf in season 3 Asia'h states "This season, she is on a mission and that mission to get revenge on the Greenleaf's. She's doing that but having problems with that. Her spirit, her conscience, she’s going back and forth."

== Personal life ==
Epperson has a love for physical fitness, and became a licensed massage therapist. She has stated that being able to help people, and make them happy makes her happy. Asia'h also enjoys the outdoors, and is a Christian.

== Filmography ==
=== Film ===
| Year | Title | Role | Notes |
|---|---|---|---|
| 2015 | Straight Outta Compton | Felicia | |
| 2020 | The Christmas Lottery | Deidre | TV movie |
| 2021 | A Message from Brianna | Kathy | |
| 2021 | A Christmas Family Reunion | Tiffanie Christmas | TV movie |
| 2021 | Dear Best Friend | Dawn | |
| 2021 | Someday at Christmas | Chance | |
| 2022 | Amaru | Simone | Short |
| 2023 | Senior Year: Love Never Fails | Patty | |
| 2023 | Black Girl Erupted | Brittany | |

=== Television ===
| Year | Title | Role | Notes |
|---|---|---|---|
| 2008 | American Idol | Herself/Contestant | Contestant: Season 7 |
| 2015 | Murder in the First | Wendi | Episode: "Number Thirty Nine" |
| 2016–20 | Greenleaf | Tasha Skanks | Recurring Cast: Season 1-3 & 5 |
| 2017 | My Crazy Ex | Mandi | Episode: "Desperate Measures, Secret Pleasures & Buried Treasures" |
| 2018 | Marlon | Tanya | Episode: "Wingman" |
| 2018 | The Bobby Brown Story | Kim Ward | Episode: "Part 1 & 2" |
| 2019 | A Black Lady Sketch Show | Background Singer | Episode: "Where Are My Background Singers?" |
| 2019 | Black Jesus | Diamond | Episode: "Boonie Comes Up" |
| 2022 | Millennials | Angel | Episode: "End Game" |
| 2022–24 | Bruh | Claudia | Recurring Cast: Season 3, Main Cast: Season 4 |
| 2023 | Broken Seeds | Brandy | Main Cast |
