= Exist (album) =

- Digital cover

Studio album by Exo
- Released: July 10, 2023
- Recorded: 2023
- Studios: Doobdoob (Seoul); SM Big Shot (Seoul); SM Blue Cup (Seoul); SM Blue Ocean (Seoul); SM Concert Hall (Seoul); SM LVYIN (Seoul); SM Sound Pool (Seoul); SM SSAM (Seoul); SM Starlight (Seoul); SM Yellow Tail (Seoul)
- Genres: K-pop; R&B
- Length: 28:25
- Languages: Korean; English
- Labels: SM; Kakao
- Producer: Tak Young-jun

Exo chronology
Don't Fight the Feeling (2021)	Exist (2023)	Reverxe (2026)

Singles from Exist
- 1. "Let Me In" Released: June 12, 2023; 2. "Hear Me Out" Released: June 30, 2023; 3. "Cream Soda" Released: July 10, 2023

Professional ratings
Review scores
Source	Rating
NME	4/5 stars

Exist is the seventh studio album by South Korean boy band Exo. It was released on July 10, 2023, by SM Entertainment. Exist is the group's first album to be promoted as a seven-member group, as member Kai was undergoing mandatory military service. The album features vocal performances from all eight Korean members, including Kai. Member Lay did not participate on this album.

== Background and release ==
Exist is Exo's seventh Korean studio album and eighth overall. The album features nine songs, including two pre-release singles; "Let Me In", released on June 12, 2023, and "Hear Me Out", released on June 30, 2023. The third single and title track, "Cream Soda", was released alongside the album.

In January 2023, the group's leader, Suho, announced that the group is set to release new music after spring.

On June 9, SM announced that Exo will release their seventh studio album on July 10. On June 12, SM announced the album's title release date, along with a video featuring Exo's updated logo. It was also announced that they would be releasing the pre-release single, "Let Me In" on the same day.

The album was released for pre-order on June 12, and is available in three photobook versions, eight digipack and eight SMini versions.

== Composition ==
The album opens with the title track "Cream Soda", a dance-pop song with an exotic rhythm and upbeat brass, keyboard and drum instrumentation. It features sensual vocals, and lyrics that compare the soft yet thrilling moment of falling in love to cream soda. The following track, "Regret It" is an energetic R&B song with a groovy 808 bass beat and colorful synths. Member Chanyeol participated in writing the lyrics, which express the intense emotions of a moment without regret. The third track which is also the second pre-release single, "Hear Me Out", is an R&B song with an old school vibe. The lyrics express the honest feelings of someone who is hesitant before starting a relationship. "Private Party" is an R&B dance song that combines powerful bass drums, dreamlike synth, vocal chops and whistling. The lyrics depict the tense attraction between two people at a private party. "Cinderella" is a synthpop song featuring an explosive drop created by pluck synth riffs and drums. Its lyrics are inspired by the tale of Cinderella, who has to leave at 12 o'clock, but doesn't want to lose someone who she was meant to be with. "No Makeup" is an R&B song with a trap beat, and lyrics stating the subject of the song's natural appearance is beautiful enough without any makeup. "Love Fool" is an R&B pop song with retro synth production. The lyrics express ones determination to not give up on love, even in situations where they cannot easily reveal their inner feelings. "Another Day" is an alternative pop song with a laid-back rhythm, 808 bass, and keyboard layering. The lyrics urge the listener to not get stuck in the past, and to greet every new day with excitement. The album closes with the first pre-release single "Let Me In", an R&B ballad with a dreamy sound and vocals that express understated emotions, with lyrics that compare a lover to a blue ocean and a longing to be together endlessly even if they fall into the deep end.

== Commercial performance ==
Prior to its release, Exist received 1.6 million pre-orders within a 28-day period, breaking Exo's previous personal record of 1.2 million with Don't Fight the Feeling (2021).

According to the International Federation of the Phonographic Industry (IFPI)'s Global Music Report for 2023, Exist was the eighth best-selling album worldwide, having sold 2.3 million units. (Note: The IFPI Global Albums chart ranks, in order, the albums that generated the most money globally across streaming, download, and physical record sales (combined) in a calendar year. The Global Album Sales Chart measures global unit sales across all physical formats, as well as full album downloads.)

== Track listing ==
Exist track listing
No.	Title	Lyrics	Music	Arrangement	Length
1.	"Cream Soda"	Moon Seol-ri	Tre Jean-Marie; Kwame "KZ" Kwei-Armah Jr.; Ebenezer Fabiyi; Bobby Candler; Adrian McKinnon	Tre Jean-Marie; KZ; Imlay	3:05
2.	"Regret It"	Jang Sang-min (Lalala Studio); Loey	Dwayne Abernathy Jr.; Lucky Daye; Prince Charles; Jeremy "Tay" Jasper; Adrian McKinnon	Dem Jointz	2:55
3.	"Hear Me Out"	Park Ji-hyun (Artiffect); Kim Dong-hyun	Tave; Jeremy "Tay" Jasper; Tavaughn Young; Adrian McKinnon; George Carroll; Sade Munirah; Grades; Jacob "Yakob" Rabitsch; Jack Rochon; Michael Orabiyi	Grades; Yakob; Jack Ro; Scribz Riley; Tave	3:24
4.	"Private Party"	Moon Seol-ri	Brandon Arreaga; Landon Sears; Rudy Sandapa; Kaelyn Behr; MZMC	Styalz Fuego; Rudy Sandapa; MZMC	3:09
5.	"Cinderella"	Lee Seu-ran	Jackson Morgan; Brandon Arreaga; Kyle Buckley; Charles Roberts Nelsen; MZMC	Pink Slip; Inverness; MZMC	2:34
6.	"No Makeup"	Moon Seol-ri	Greg Bonnick; Hayden Chapman; Adrian McKinnon; Sevn Dayz	LDN Noise	3:24
7.	"Love Fool"	Cha Yu-bin (Verygoods)	John Mars; Christian Fast; Jimmy Claeson	Mars	3:22
8.	"Another Day"	Mola; ChaMane	K. Nita; Maria Hazell; Matthew Grant; Robin Ellingsen; Balazs Harko; ChaMane	K. Nita; Maria Hazell; Matthew Grant; Robin Ellingsen; Balazs Harko	3:11
9.	"Let Me In"	Enzo	Je'Juan Antonio; Hassan Ashi Jr.; Jayden Henry; Jordain Johnson; Kelsey Merges; Noah Barer; Kaelin Ellis; Hautboi Rich	Noah Barer; Kaelin Ellis	3:17
Total length:					28:25

== Charts ==
=== Weekly charts ===
Weekly chart performance for Exist
Chart (2023)	Peak position
Japanese Albums (Oricon)	5
Japanese Combined Albums (Oricon)	7
Japanese Hot Albums (Billboard Japan)	4
South Korean Albums (Circle)	1
Swedish Physical Albums (Sverigetopplistan)	17
UK Album Downloads (Official Charts)	33
UK Independent Album Breakers (OCC)	13

=== Monthly charts ===
Monthly chart performance for Exist
Chart (2023)	Position
Japanese Albums (Oricon)	13
South Korean Albums (Circle)	4

=== Year-end charts ===
Year-end chart performance for Exist
Chart (2023)	Position
South Korean Albums (Circle)	18

== Certifications and sales ==
Certifications and sales for Exist
Region	Certification	Certified units/sales
Japan	—	11,899
South Korea (KMCA)	Million	1,738,208
South Korea (KMCA) SMC version	Platinum	277,446
Summaries
Worldwide (IFPI)	—	2,300,000

== Release history ==
Release history for Exist
Region	Date	Format	Label
South Korea	July 10, 2023	CD; SMC	SM; Kakao
Various	July 10, 2023	Digital download; streaming	SM; Kakao
