= Chen discography =

South Korean singer and songwriter discography

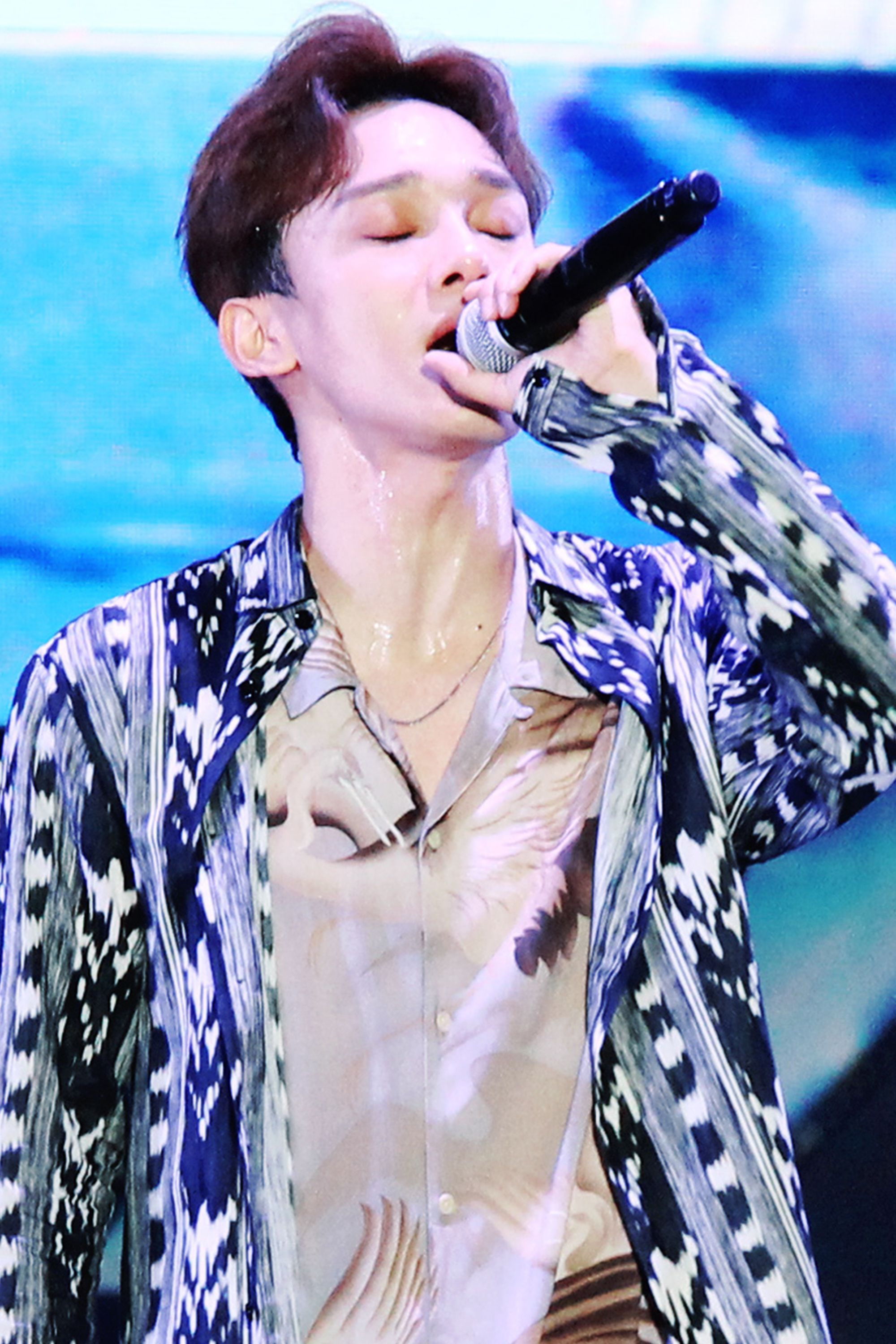
- Chen performing at the Lotte Family Concert, in June 2018
- EPs: 5
- Singles: 8
- Promotional singles: 1
- Soundtrack appearances: 9
- Music videos: 7

The discography of the South Korean singer and songwriter Chen consists of five extended plays, eight singles (including two as featured artist), one promotional single and nine appearances in soundtracks.

In April 2016, Chen and rapper Heize released "Lil' Something (썸타)", a song produced by Ryu Jae-hyun member of Vibe, as the ninth weekly single of SM Entertainment's Station music project. In October 2016, he collaborated with DJ Alesso on another song for the Station project titled "Years". In January 2017, Chen collaborated with Dynamic Duo in a song titled "Nosedive", becoming the first artist to be featured in the group's collaboration project "Mixxxture". In November 2017, Chen collaborated with South Korean singer 10cm on a song titled "Bye Babe" for the second season of SM Entertainment's Station project.

Chen released his first extended play, titled April, and a Flower on April 1, 2019. The standard EP version sold more than 185,000 copies in South Korea in its first month of release.

== Extended plays ==
=== Korean extended plays ===
List of Korean extended plays, with selected chart positions and sales
Title	EP details	Peak chart positions							Sales
Title	EP details	KOR	JPN	JPN Hot	UK Dig.	US Heat	US Indie	US World	Sales
April, and a Flower	Released: April 1, 2019; Label: SM Entertainment; Formats: CD, digital download, streaming, SMC	2	51	34	92	7	33	3	KOR: 212,252; JPN: 3,220; US: 1,000
Dear My Dear	Released: October 1, 2019; Label: SM Entertainment; Formats: CD, digital download, streaming, SMC	1	36	31	—	—	—	7	KOR: 169,570; JPN: 1,902 (Phy.)
Last Scene	Released: November 14, 2022; Label: SM Entertainment; Formats: CD, digital download, streaming, SMC	1	22	—	—	—	—	—	KOR: 90,878; JPN: 2,720 (Phy.)
Door	Released: May 28, 2024; Label: INB100; Formats: CD, digital download, streaming	4	—	98	—	—	—	—	KOR: 81,095
Arcadia	Released: September 29, 2025; Label: INB100; Formats: CD, digital download, streaming	13	—	—	—	—	—	—	KOR: 25,004
"—" denotes releases that did not chart or were not released in that region.

=== Japanese extended plays ===
List of Japanese extended plays, with selected chart positions and sales
Title	EP details	Peak chart positions		Sales
Title	EP details	JPN	JPN Hot	Sales
Polaris (ポラリス)	Released: August 17, 2023; Label: Avex Trax; Formats: CD, digital download, streaming, LP; Track listing: 1. "Break Out"; 2. "Free World"; 3. "On the Road"; 4. "Mirage of Flower"; 5. "My Sunshine"; 6. "Light of My Life"	6	6	JPN: 11,384

== Singles ==
=== As lead artist ===
==== Korean singles ====
List of Korean singles, with selected chart positions, showing year released and album name
Title	Year	Peak chart positions		Album
Title	Year	KOR Circle	KOR Songs (Note: Includes the Billboard K-pop Hot 100 (defunct as of 2022), and South Korea Songs (part of Billboard's Hits of the World (2022 onwards)).)	Album
"Beautiful Goodbye" (사월이 지나면 우리 헤어져요)	2019	4	2	April, and a Flower
"Shall We?" (우리 어떻게 할까요?)	2019	12	14	Dear My Dear
"Hello" (안녕)	2020	— (Note: "Hello" did not enter the Gaon Digital Chart, but peaked at number 39 and 90 on the Gaon BGM Chart and the Gaon Download Chart, respectively.)	—	Non-album single
"Last Scene" (사라지고 있어)	2022	— (Note: "Last Scene" did not enter the Circle Digital Chart, but peaked at number 21 and 27 on the Circle BGM Chart and the Circle Download Chart, respectively.)	—	Last Scene
"Empty" (빈 집)	2024	— (Note: "Empty" did not enter the Circle Digital Chart, but peaked at number 48 on the Circle Download Chart.)	—	Door
"Love You"	2024	— (Note: "Love You" did not enter the Circle Digital Chart, but peaked at number 71 on the Circle Download Chart.)	—	Beyond:
"Broken Party"	2025	—	—	Non-album single
"Arcadia"	2025	— (Note: "Arcadia" did not enter the Circle Digital Chart, but peaked at number 91 on the Circle Download Chart.)	—	Arcadia
"—" denotes releases that did not chart or were not released in that region.

==== Japanese singles ====
List of Japanese singles, showing year released and album name
Title	Year	Album
"Break Out"	2023	Polaris
"Free World"	2023	Polaris
"On the Road"	2023	Polaris
"Mirage of Flower"	2023	Polaris

=== As featured artist ===
List of collaborations, with selected chart positions, showing year released and album name
Title	Year	Peak chart positions	Album
Title	Year	KOR	Album
"May We Bye" (오월의 어느 봄날) (Onestar featuring Chen)	2019	80	Non-album single
"Love" (Ailee featuring Chen)	2019	168	Butterfly

=== Promotional singles ===
List of promotional singles, with selected chart positions, showing year released, sales and album name
Title	Year	Peak chart positions	Sales	Album
Title	Year	KOR	Sales	Album
"Though I Loved You" (사랑했지만)	2015	33	KOR: 46,030	2015 Gayo Daejun Limited Edition

=== Collaborations ===
List of collaborative singles, with selected chart positions, showing year released, sales and album name
Title	Year	Peak chart positions			Sales	Album
Title	Year	KOR Circle	KOR Songs	US World	Sales	Album
"Lil' Something" (썸타) (with Vibe X Heize)	2016	12	—N/a	17	KOR: 404,653	SM Station Season 1
"Years" (with Alesso)	2016	— (Note: "Years (Chinese Version)" did not enter the Gaon Digital Chart, but reached number 94 on the Gaon International Digital Chart.)	—N/a	20	KOR: 21,726	SM Station Season 1
"Nosedive" (기다렸다 가) (with Dynamic Duo)	2017	2	—N/a	—	KOR: 624,801	Mixxxture Project Vol.1
"Bye Babe" (with 10cm)	2017	28	48	24	KOR: 121,867	SM Station Season 2
"You" (혼자) (with Dynamic Duo)	2020	105	77	—	—N/a	SM Station Season 4
"—" denotes releases that did not chart or were not released in that region. Note: K-pop Hot 100 was introduced in August 2011, discontinued in July 2014 and was re-established on December 30, 2017.

== Soundtrack appearances ==
List of soundtrack singles, with selected chart positions, showing year released, sales and album name
Title	Year	Peak chart positions			Sales	Album
Title	Year	KOR Circle	KOR Songs	US World	Sales	Album
"Best Luck" (최고의 행운)	2014	9	—	—	KOR: 638,264	It's Okay, That's Love OST Part 1
"Everytime" (with Punch)	2016	1	—	14	KOR: 1,241,255	Descendants of the Sun OST Part 2
"If I Love Again" (다시 사랑한다면) (with Chanyeol)	2016	38	—	—	KOR: 78,517	Two Yoo Project – Sugar Man OST Part 32
"Beautiful Accident" (美好的意外) (with Suho)	2016	—	—	—	—N/a	Beautiful Accident OST
"For You" (너를 위해) (with Baekhyun and Xiumin)	2016	5	—	9	KOR: 625,756	Moon Lovers: Scarlet Heart Ryeo OST Part 1
"I'm Not Okay" (안녕 못해)	2017	21	—	—	KOR: 109,044	Missing 9 OST Part 2
"Cherry Blossom Love Song" (벚꽃연가)	2018	21	26	—	—N/a	100 Days My Prince OST Part 3
"Make It Count"	2019	75	74	—	—N/a	Touch Your Heart OST Part 1
"Rainfall"	2019	— (Note: "Rainfall" did not enter the Gaon Digital Chart, but peaked at number 103 on the Gaon Download Chart.)	—	—	—N/a	Chief of Staff OST Part 1
"Beautiful" (아름다워)	2019	— (Note: "Beautiful" did not enter the Gaon Digital Chart, but peaked at number 32 and 83 on the Gaon BGM Chart and the Gaon Download Chart, respectively.)	87	—	—N/a	Heart 4 U OST
"Your Moonlight" (너의 달빛)	2020	152	—	—	—N/a	Do You Like Brahms? OST Part 3
"An Unfamiliar Day" (낯선 하루)	2022	— (Note: "An Unfamiliar Day" did not enter the Circle Digital Chart, but peaked at number 30 and 100 on the Circle BGM Chart and Circle Download Chart, respectively.)	—	—	—N/a	Doctor Lawyer OST Part 2
"Heaven for You"	2022	— (Note: "Heaven for You" did not enter the Circle Digital Chart, but peaked at number 36 and 105 on the Circle BGM Chart and Circle Download Chart, respectively.)	—	—	—N/a	The First Responders OST Part 3
"The Way to Love Myself" (나 사랑법)	2024	— (Note: "The Way to Love Myself" did not enter the Circle Digital Chart, but peaked at number 31 and 66 on the Circle BGM Chart and Circle Download Chart, respectively.)	—	—	—N/a	Doctor Slump OST Part 3
"Don't Remember" (기억하지 말아요)	2024	— (Note: "Don't Remember" did not enter the Circle Digital Chart, but peaked at number 53 on the Circle Download Chart.)	—	—	—N/a	Romance in the House OST Part 2
"—" denotes releases that did not chart or were not released in that region.

== Other appearances ==
List of other singles, with selected chart positions, showing year released, sales and album name
Title	Year	Peak chart positions		Sales	Album
Title	Year	KOR Circle	KOR Songs	Sales	Album
"Dear My Family" (as part of SM Town)	2012	—	—	—N/a	I AM. OST
"A Day Without You" (하루) (with Jonghyun, as part of SM the Ballad)	2014	8	21	KOR: 138,388	SM the Ballad Vol. 2 – Breath
"When I Was... When U Were..." (좋았던 건, 아팠던 건) (with Krystal, as part of SM the Ballad)	2014	31	44	KOR: 83,820	SM the Ballad Vol. 2 – Breath
"Breath" (呼吸) (with Zhang Liyin, as part of SM the Ballad)	2014	68	—	KOR: 19,290	SM the Ballad Vol. 2 – Breath
"Up Rising"	2014	—	—	KOR: 16,029	Exology Chapter 1: The Lost Planet
"Dear My Family" (2017 ver.) (as part of SM Town)	2017	38	—	—N/a	SM Station Season 2
"—" denotes releases that did not chart or were not released in that region.

== Other charted songs ==
List of other charted songs, with selected chart positions, showing year released and album name
Title	Year	Peak chart positions		Album
Title	Year	KOR Circle	KOR Songs	Album
"Flower" (꽃)	2019	47	16	April, and a Flower
"Sorry Not Sorry" (하고 싶던 말)	2019	77	19	April, and a Flower
"Love Words" (사랑의 말)	2019	82	21	April, and a Flower
"I'll Be There" (먼저 가 있을게)	2019	85	22	April, and a Flower
"Portrait of You" (널 그리다)	2019	91	23	April, and a Flower
"Hold You Tight" (널 안지 않을 수 있어야지)	2019	74	46	Dear My Dear
"My Dear" (그대에게)	2019	86	61	Dear My Dear
"Amaranth" (고운 그대는 시들지 않으리)	2019	90	62	Dear My Dear
"You Never Know" (그댄 모르죠)	2019	94	65	Dear My Dear
"Good Night" (잘 자요)	2019	98	69	Dear My Dear

== Songwriting ==
Song	Year	Album	Artist	Lyrics		Music	
Song	Year	Album	Artist	Credited	With	Credited	With
"Promise (EXO 2014)" (約定)	2015	Love Me Right	Exo	Yes	Zhang Yixing	No	—
"Promise (EXO 2014)" (약속)	2015	Love Me Right	Exo	Yes	Park Chan-yeol; Zhang Yixing	No	—
"She's Dreaming" (梦)	2016	Lotto	Exo	Yes	Wang Ya-jun	No	—
"She's Dreaming" (꿈)	2016	Lotto	Exo	Yes	—N/a	No	—
"Ko Ko Bop" (Korean version)	2017	The War	Exo	Yes	Park Chan-yeol; Byun Baek-hyun; JQ; Hyun Ji-won	No	—
"Touch It" (너의 손짓)	2017	The War	Exo	Yes	Jo Yoon-kyung	No	—
"Bye Babe"	2017	SM Station Season 2	Chen, 10cm	Yes	—N/a	No	—
"Lights Out"	2017	Universe	Exo	Yes	—N/a	No	—
"Love Shot"	2018	Love Shot	Exo	Yes	Jo Yoon-kyung; Park Chan-yeol	No	—
"My Dear" (그대에게)	2019	Dear My Dear	Chen	Yes	Kim Je-hwi	No	—
"Flower"	2019	April, and a Flower	Chen	Yes	JQ	No	—
"Beautiful"	2019	Heart for U OST	Chen	Yes	—	Yes	—
"I Don't Even Mind"	2022	Last Scene	Chen	Yes	—	Yes	—
"Empty" (빈 집)	2024	Door	Chen	Yes	Chancellor; Knave; N0ise	Yes	Chancellor; Knave; N0ise
"Dandelion" (꽃씨)	2024	Door	Chen	Yes	Baekhyun; Chancellor; Knave; N0ise	No	—
"Playlist"	2024	Door	Chen	Yes	Haon; Be'O; Rookie 81; Duble Sidekick	Yes	Haon; Be'O; Colde; Stally; Park Gyu-tae; Rookie 81; Duble Sidekick
"Fall in Love Again"	2024	Door	Chen	Yes	—	No	—
"Remember" (회상)	2024	Door	Chen	Yes	Park Ji-soo (Chapter M)	No	—
"Love is U"	2025	Interview X	Xiumin	Yes	—N/a	No	—N/a
"Broken Party"	2025	Non-album single	Chen	Yes	Park Ji-soo (Chapter M)	No	—

== Music videos ==
As lead artist
Title	Year	Other Artist(s)	Notes	Ref.
"Lil' Something"	2016	With Vibe and Heize		
"Years"	2016	With Alesso		
"Nosedive"	2017	With Dynamic Duo		
"Bye Babe"	2017	With 10cm	Live performance	
"Beautiful Goodbye"	2019		Debut music video	
"Flower"	2019			
"Shall We?"	2019			
"Hello"	2020			
"Last Scene"	2022			
"Light of My Life"	2023			
"Empty"	2024			

As featured artist
Title	Year	Artist(s)	Notes	Ref.
"May We Bye"	2019	Onestar	Live performance	

Videos of soundtracks
Title	Year	Other artist(s)	Notes	Ref.
"The Best Luck"	2014			
"Everytime"	2016	With Punch	Containing only scenes of Descendants of the Sun	
"Beautiful Accident"	2016	With Suho	For the soundtrack to the movie Beautiful Accident	
"For You"	2016	With Baekhyun and Xiumin	Containing only scenes of Moon Lovers	

Appearances in music videos
Title	Year	Artist(s)	Notes
"No.1"	2014	BoA	Remake for EXO 90:2014
"Can You Feel It?"	2015	Super Junior-D&E	

Other appearances
Title	Year	Artist(s)	Notes	Ref.
"Dear My Family"	2012	Various	As part of SM Town	
"Breath"	2014	Zhang Liyin	As part of SM the Ballad	
"Imagine"	2016	Various	As part of UNICEF	
"Dear My Family"	2017	Various	As part of SM Town; Live performance	
