= Denis Kenzo =

Russian DJ and music producer (born 1989)

- Born: Denis Pisarev; 10 May 1989 (age 36); Khabarovsk, Soviet Union
- Origin: Russia
- Genres: Trance, progressive trance
- Occupations: Musician, DJ
- Instruments: Synthesizer, computer, Steinberg Cubase
- Years active: 2012–present
- Labels: Armada Music, Armind, Denis Kenzo Recordings

Denis Pisarev (born 10 May 1989), known professionally as Denis Kenzo is a Russian DJ, music producer, and a partner in the musical duo Two&One. Since 2016, he is the label owner of Denis Kenzo Recordings. Kenzo was born in Khabarovsk, Russia.

== Career ==
At the beginning of his career, Kenzo's work was characterized by the release of singles with little-known performers. During that period, he attempted to become a producer who would produce electronic music exclusively.

From 2012 to 2013, Kenzo worked together with Mikhail Gasyak as musical duet Two & One, releasing progressive trance songs.

From 2014 to present, he worked as a solo artist, producing vocal trance under the Denis Kenzo pseudonym. Some compositions were recorded with the participation of his wife Svetlana Pisareva (Sveta B.). His popular tracks were released on Sir Adrian Music label, which he worked on for 4 years. "Lullaby Lonely" was included in the "State Of Trance 2013" compilation, "Ashes" was included in the A State of Tranсe 2015 compilation, and several tracks were also included in the Vocal Trance Hits - The Best of 2016 compilation. The unofficial clip for his "Run Away" song is currently the Denis' highest viewed video with a one million views.

In the summer of 2016, he launched his own Denis Kenzo Recordings label.

On January 31, 2017, the Denis Kenzo Recordings label was picked up by Armada Music until 2019.

On July 1, 2022, he released his first album, entree.

On November 11, 2022, he released a collaborative album with Whiteout, titled 'Intelligency'.

== Discography ==
=== Albums ===
- 2022 - entree
- 2022 - Intelligency

=== Singles ===
Release date	Title	Recording Artist(s)	Label
2012	See You Smile	Two&One	Inov8 Recordings
2012	The End Is Over	Two&One, Anthya	Harmonic Breeze Recordings
2013	Reasons Later	Two&One, Jess Morgan	Amsterdam Trance Records
2013	Dream State	Two&One, Sarah Russel	AdrianRazRecordings
2013	Siren Song	Two&One, Kimberly Hale	Amsterdam Trance Records
2013	I Say Goodbye	Two&One, Eskova	Arisa Audio
2013	Sitorya	Two&One, Denis Kenzo, Sveta B.	How Trance Works
2014	Sequoia	Denis Kenzo	COF Recordings
2014	Lullaby Lonely	Denis Kenzo, Sveta B.	InfraProgressive
2014	Lullaby For Two	Denis Kenzo, Sveta B.	Armind
2014	Lifetime Change	Denis Kenzo, Alexandra Badoi	Armind
2014	Just Believe Me Yesterday	Denis Kenzo, Sveta B.	Armind
2014	Will Be Forever	Denis Kenzo, Jilliana Danise	How Trance Works
2014	Deep In My Heart	Denis Kenzo, Sveta B.	Armind
2014	Find the Light	Denis Kenzo, Kimberly Hale	How Trance Works
2015	L'Adore	Denis Kenzo	How Trance Works
2015	Ashes	Denis Kenzo, Sarah Lynn	How Trance Works
2015	Can You Hear Me	Denis Kenzo, Sarah Russell	How Trance Works
2015	Listen	Denis Kenzo, Kimberly Hale	How Trance Works
2015	Be A Dreamer	Denis Kenzo, Cari	How Trance Works
2015	Let Me Go	Denis Kenzo, Sveta B.	A State Of Trance
2015	Right Path	Denis Kenzo, Jilliana Danise	Sir Adrian Music
2016	#TheValue!	Denis Kenzo, Cari	How Trance Works
2016	What I See	Denis Kenzo, Vika	How Trance Works
2016	Sunshine Blue	Denis Kenzo, Sveta B.	A State Of Trance
2016	Beautiful Creature	Denis Kenzo, Ana Criado	Sir Adrian Music
2016	More Time	Denis Kenzo, Alexandra Badoi	Sir Adrian Music
2016	Save Me	Denis Kenzo, Cari	Denis Kenzo Recordings
2016	Reasons Why	Denis Kenzo, Vika	A State Of Trance
2016	Run Away	Denis Kenzo, Angel Falls	Denis Kenzo Recordings
2017	After Dark	Denis Kenzo	A State Of Trance
2017	Dancing In The Dark	Denis Kenzo, Hanna Finsen	Denis Kenzo Recordings
2017	Only Ones Alive	Denis Kenzo, Lucid Blue	Denis Kenzo Recordings
2017	Just To Hear	Denis Kenzo, Sveta B.	Denis Kenzo Recordings
2017	Whisper	Denis Kenzo, Angel Falls	Denis Kenzo Recordings
2017	U & I	Denis Kenzo, Claire Willis	Denis Kenzo Recordings
2017	Somnambulist	Denis Kenzo	Armind
2017	NGZZ!	Denis Kenzo	A State Of Trance
2018	Other Side	Denis Kenzo, Clara Yates	Denis Kenzo Recordings
2018	Who I Am	Denis Kenzo, Fahjah, Kate Miles	Denis Kenzo Recordings
2018	Guide	Denis Kenzo, Kate Miles	Denis Kenzo Recordings
2018	Sweet Lie	Denis Kenzo, Sveta B.	Denis Kenzo Recordings
2018	Stay	Denis Kenzo	Denis Kenzo Recordings
2019	Walking Away	Denis Kenzo, Susie Ledge	Denis Kenzo Recordings
2019	Rise Above The Sun	Denis Kenzo, Zein Hallak	Denis Kenzo Recordings
2019	Reasons Cry	Denis Kenzo, Sveta B.	Denis Kenzo Recordings
2019	Belief Without Sight	Denis Kenzo, Sarah Lynn	Raz Nitzan Music
2020	Singing Back to Love	Denis Kenzo, Zein Hallak	Denis Kenzo Recordings
2020	Need You Now	Denis Kenzo, Whiteout, Sveta B.	Denis Kenzo Recordings
2020	Faster	Denis Kenzo, Farzin Salehi, Rebecca Louise Burch	Denis Kenzo Recordings
2021	On Your Arms	Denis Kenzo	Denis Kenzo Recordings
2021	Sequence	Denis Kenzo, Whiteout	Denis Kenzo Recordings
2021	Far from Behind	Denis Kenzo, Clara Yates	Denis Kenzo Recordings
2021	Leave	Denis Kenzo, Whiteout	Denis Kenzo Recordings
2022	.entree (album)	Denis Kenzo, Whiteout, Sveta B. Clara Yates	Denis Kenzo Recordings
2022	Breathe Me In	Whiteout, Denis Kenzo	Denis Kenzo Recordings
2022	Always In My Head	Denis Kenzo, Whiteout	Denis Kenzo Recordings
2022	About You	Whiteout, Denis Kenzo	Denis Kenzo Recordings
2022	Slower	Denis Kenzo, Whiteout	Denis Kenzo Recordings
2022	Intelligency (album)	Denis Kenzo, Whiteout	Denis Kenzo Recordings
2023	Falling	Denis Kenzo	Denis Kenzo Recordings
2023	Selected	Denis Kenzo, VAMER	Denis Kenzo Recordings
2023	Have My Heart	Two&One, Cathy Burton	Raz Nitzan Music
2023	One More Day	Denis Kenzo, Ana Criado	Raz Nitzan Music
2023	One More Sunrise	Two&One, Sarah Russell	Raz Nitzan Music
2024	Broken Angel	Denis Kenzo, VAMER	Denis Kenzo Recordings
2024	Call My Name	Denis Kenzo	Denis Kenzo Recordings
2024	You Lift Me Up	Two&One and Ellie Lawson	Raz Nitzan Music

=== Remixes ===
Release date	Track name	Original Artist	Label
2012	Where Are You (Denis Kenzo Remix)	Phillipo Blake, V.Ray, Nikolay Kempinskiy	Arrant Records
2012	Under The Same Sky (Two&One Remix)	Space RockerZ, Ellie Lawson	AdrianRazRecordings
2012	Straight From My Heart (Two&One Remix)	Turn & Aguada, Eskova	AdrianRazRecordings
2013	Te Quiero (Denis Kenzo Remix)	Rave CHannel	Promind Recordings
2013	Sky Is On Fire (Two&One Remix)	Sneijder, Jess Morgan	Amsterdam Trance Records
2013	Should've Known Better (Two&One Remix)	Xtigma, Paulina Dubaj	AdrianRazRecordings
2013	In Your Arms (Two&One Remix)	Somna, Emma Elizabeth	Molekular Sounds
2013	Running On Empty (Two&One Remix)	Richard Durand, Neev Kennedy	AdrianRazRecordings
2014	Silent Heart (Denis Kenzo Remix)	Susana	How Trance Works
2014	Save Me (Denis Kenzo Remix)	Eranga, Mino Safy, Sarah Russell	How Trance Works
2015	Break The Ice (Denis Kenzo Remix)	Roman Messer, LJ Ayrten	Suanda Music
2015	Be The Light (Denis Kenzo Remix)	Alexander Turok, Neev Kennedy	How Trance Works
2015	Your Land (Denis Kenzo Remix)	Emanuele Braveri, Hanna Finsen	Amsterdam Trance Records
2015	The Promise (Denis Kenzo Remix)	NoMosk, Tiff Lacey	Suanda Music
2015	Closer (Denis Kenzo Remix)	Roman Messer, Eric Lumiere	Suanda Music
2015	Sparks After The Sunset (Denis Kenzo Remix)	Cosmic Gate, Sarah Lynn	Wake Your Mind Records
2016	The Calling (Denis Kenzo Remix)	Kayat, Clare Stagg	Suanda Voice
2016	Vulnerable (Denis Kenzo Remix)	Ana Criado	Raz Nitzan Music
2016	World Like This (Denis Kenzo Remix)	Alexander Popov, Jonathan Mendelsohn	Armind
2016	Face Of Summer (Denis Kenzo Remix)	Armin van Buuren, Sarah deCourcy	Armada Music
2017	Born Again (Denis Kenzo Remix)	Bobina, May-Britt Scheffer	Black Hole Recordings
2017	Like A Miracle (Denis Kenzo Remix)	FloE, DJ T.H., Kate Miles	Entrancing Music
2017	All About You (Denis Kenzo Remix)	Straight Up, Lokka Vox	Raz Nitzan Music
2017	Cold (Denis Kenzo Remix)	ThoBa, Bethany Marie	Eximinds Airlines
2018	Make It Last (Denis Kenzo Remix)	FloE, Kate Miles	Entrancing Music
2018	Hold Of You (Denis Kenzo Remix)	Kaimo K	Raz Nitzan Music
2019	Echo Of My Soul (Denis Kenzo Remix)	Raz Nitzan, Maria Nayler	Raz Nitzan Music
2019	Adore You (Denis Kenzo Remix)	FloE, Aly Frank	Entrancing Music
2021	We Are One (Denis Kenzo Remix)	Dennis Sheperd, Roger Shah, Adam Is A Girl	Black Hole Recordings
2022	Drowning In Love (Denis Kenzo Remix)	Norni, Eximinds, Alexandra Badoi	Eximinds Airlines
2023	In The End (Denis Kenzo Remix)	Mully, Shvman, Robbie Rosen, RAM6	Emengy Deep
