= Amila =

Amila is a given name which may refer to:

== Tribe ==
- Amila (tribe), an ancient and medieval Arab tribe in the Levant.

== Men ==
- Amila Abeysekara (born 1983), Sri Lankan actor
- Amila Aponso (born 1993), Sri Lankan professional cricketer
- Amila Eranga (born 1986), Sri Lankan cricketer
- Amila Gunawardene (born 1980), Sri Lankan cricketer
- Amila Kiriella (born 1982), Sri Lankan former cricketer
- Amila Madusanka (born 1992), Sri Lankan cricketer
- Amila Mendis (born 1982), Sri Lankan former cricketer
- Amila Perera (born 1979), Sri Lankan professional cricketer
- Amila Sandaruwan (born 1984), Sri Lankan former cricketer
- Amila Weththasinghe (born 1982), Sri Lankan former cricketer

== Women ==
- Amila Glamočak (born 1966), Bosnian singer
