= The Renaissance (Super Junior album) =

2021 studio album by Super Junior

- Digital and The Renaissance version cover

Studio album by Super Junior
- Released: March 16, 2021
- Recorded: 2020–21
- Studios: Doobdoob (Seoul); Prelude (Seoul); Seoul; SM Booming System (Seoul); SM LVYIN (Seoul); SM SSAM (Seoul); SM Yellow Tail (Seoul)
- Genre: K-pop
- Length: 32:30
- Language: Korean
- Labels: SM; Label SJ; Dreamus
- Producers: Lee Soo-man; Sebastian Thott; Yoo Young-jin; 153CreatorsClub; NIve; Blair Taylor; Jake K; Squar; PhD; Nicklas Kings; Hwang Sung-jae; Grades; Coach & Sendo; Voradory

Super Junior chronology
Star (2021)	The Renaissance (2021)	The Road: Winter for Spring (2022)

Singles from The Renaissance
- 1. "The Melody" Released: November 6, 2020; 2. "House Party" Released: March 16, 2021

The Renaissance is the eleventh Korean-language studio album (twelfth overall) by South Korean boy band Super Junior, released on March 16, 2021, by SM Entertainment. As part of their fifteenth anniversary, the album features the vocals of nine Super Junior members, which are Leeteuk, Heechul, Yesung, Shindong, Eunhyuk, Donghae, Siwon, Ryeowook and Kyuhyun.

== Background ==
On November 6, 2020, Super Junior pre-released the song "The Melody" to celebrate their 15th anniversary. Leeteuk and Yesung took part in writing the lyrics.

The album was originally planned to be released in December 2020. However, Label SJ dropped an official statement in their official Twitter account on December 9, 2020, stating that the release of the album had been delayed to January 2021. On January 8, 2021, Label SJ announced the release date of the album, which was set on February 16, 2021. However, Label SJ once again delayed the release of the album on February 1, 2021, due to unavoidable circumstances. It stated that the release of the album had been pushed back to March 16, 2021.

== Promotion ==
=== Live performances ===
On March 16, 2021, Super Junior made their comeback, "Super Junior Comeback Show 'House Party'", through Mnet. They performed their title song, "House Party", in the show. They also performed their previous hit song, "U". On the same day, the group confirmed to film You Hee-yeol's Sketchbook after 11 years since their last group appearance.

== Sales and reception ==
=== Critical reception ===
Professional ratings
Review scores
Source	Rating
NME	4.0/5 stars

The Renaissance was met with generally positive reception. On her NME review, Ruby C gave the album four out of five stars, stating that the majority of the album after "House Party" had "fall[en] neatly under two contrasting concepts" that "form[ed] an interesting paradox": songs that showed the band's musical evolution, and songs that "evoke nostalgia".

== Track listing ==
The Renaissance track listing
No.	Title	Lyrics	Music	Arrangement	Length
1.	"Super"	JQ; Ahn Young-ju; Ameli	Kim Chang-rak; Kim Soo-bin	Jo Se-hee; Chae Gang-hae; Choi Seul-gi	1:30
2.	"House Party"	Yoo Young-jin	Christian Fast; Didrik Thott; Sebastian Thott; Yoo Young-jin	Christian Fast; Didrik Thott; Sebastian Thott; Yoo Young-jin	4:01
3.	"Burn the Floor"	Jo Yoon-kyung	Park Ji-soo; 153CreatorsClub; Blair Taylor; Jake K	Park Ji-soo; 153CreatorsClub; Blair Taylor; Jake K	3:45
4.	"Paradox"	jane; Rick Bridges	SQUAR; jane; Oiaisle; Rick Bridges	SQUAR	3:16
5.	"Closer"	Agnes Shin	Sam Merrifield; Daniel Schulz; Daniel Davidsen; Peter Wallevik	PhD	3:29
6.	"The Melody" (우리에게; Wuli Ege; lit. To You)	Leeteuk; Yesung; Min Yeon-jae	Niclas Kings; Didrik Thott; Andy Love	Niclas Kings	3:11
7.	"Raining Spell for Love" (remake ver.) (사랑이 멎지 않게; Sarang-i Meotji Ankye; So That Love Won't Up)	Jeong Ju-hee (Note: Jeong Ju-hee took part in writing the track lyrics, while Eunhyuk was credited in writing the short rap lyrics.)	Teddy Riley; DOM; Lee Hyun-seung; J.SOL	Hwang Seong-je	3:16
8.	"Mystery"	Kim Min-ji	Daniel Traynor; Jess Morgan; Jack Morgan; Coach & Sendo	Daniel Traynor; Jess Morgan; Jack Morgan; Coach & Sendo	2:57
9.	"More Days with You" (같이 걸읅까; Gatt-i Geolokka; lit. Shall We Hang Out Together)	Hwang Yoo-bin	Young Chance; Voradory	Voradory	4:13
10.	"Tell Me Baby" (하얀 거짓말; Hayan Geotjimal; lit. White Lie)	Lee Hyo-jae; Im Su-ran	Zaydro	Zaydro	3:09
Total length:					32:35

== Charts ==
=== Weekly charts ===
Weekly chart performance for The Renaissance
Chart (2021)	Peak position
Japanese Hot Albums (Billboard Japan)	18
Japanese Albums (Oricon)	24
South Korean Albums (Gaon)	1

=== Year-end charts ===
Year-end chart performance for The Renaissance
Chart (2021)	Position
South Korean Albums (Gaon)	29

== Credits ==
Credits adapted from the album's liner notes.

Studio

- SM Yellow Tail Studio – recording (track 1, 4–5), digital editing (track 5), engineered for mix (track 5, 7, 9)
- Doobdoob Studio – recording (track 1, 3–4, 7–10), digital editing (track 6, 8)
- SM Booming System – recording, digital editing, engineered for mix, mixing (track 2)
- SM LVYIN Studio – recording (track 4–6), digital editing (track 4), engineered for mix (track 4, 10), mixing (track 10)
- SM SSAM Studio – recording (track 4), engineered for mix (track 1, 3, 6, 8)
- Prelude Studio – recording (track 9)
- Seoul Studio – recording (track 9)
- SM Blue Cup Studio – mixing (track 1, 8)
- SM Blue Ocean Studio – mixing (track 3, 6–7)
- SM Big Shot Studio – mixing (track 4)
- SM Concert Hall Studio – mixing (track 5, 9)
- 821 Sound – mastering (track 1, 3–10)
- Sonic Korea – mastering (track 2)

Personnel

- Label SJ – executive producer
- SM Entertainment – executive supervisor
- Lee Soo-man – producer
- Tak Young-jun – production director
- Super Junior – vocals (all tracks), background vocals (track 2)
  - Leeteuk – lyrics (track 6), background vocals (track 2)
  - Heechul – background vocals (track 2)
  - Yesung – lyrics (track 6), background vocals (track 2, 7)
  - Shindong – background vocals (track 2)
  - Eunhyuk – lyrics (track 7), background vocals (track 2)
  - Donghae – background vocals (track 2)
  - Siwon – background vocals (track 2)
  - Ryeowook – background vocals (track 2, 7)
  - Kyuhyun – background vocals (track 2, 7)
- JQ – lyrics (track 1)
- Ahn Young-ju – lyrics (track 1)
- Ameli – lyrics (track 1)
- Kim Chang-rak – composition, vocal directing, background vocals, digital editing (track 1)
- Kim Soo-bin – composition, vocal directing, background vocals, digital editing (track 1)
- Jo Se-hee – arrangement, drums, bass, keyboards (track 1)
- Chae Gang-hae – arrangement, drums, bass, keyboards (track 1)
- Choi Seul-gi – arrangement (track 1)
- Yoo Young-jin – lyrics, composition, arrangement, vocal directing, recording, digital editing, engineered for mix, mixing (track 2), background vocals (track 2–3), music and sound supervisor (all tracks)
- Christian Fast – composition, arrangement (track 2)
- Didrik Thott – composition (track 2, 6), arrangement (track 2)
- Sebastian Thott – composition, arrangement (track 2)
- Jo Yoon-kyung – lyrics (track 3)
- Park Ji-soo – composition, arrangement, drums, keyboards, guitar, strings (track 3)
- 153CreatorsClub – composition, arrangement (track 3)
  - MRey – drums, keyboards, strings (track 3)
  - Joony – drums, keyboards, strings (track 3)
- Blair Taylor – composition, arrangement, drums, keyboards (track 3)
- Jake K – composition, arrangement, strings arrangement (track 3)
- jane – lyrics, composition (track 4)
- Rick Bridges – lyrics, composition, vocal directing, background vocals (track 4)
- SQUAR – composition, arrangement, drums, bass, keyboards, digital editing (track 4)
- Oiaisle – composition, vocal directing, background vocals (track 4)
- Agnes Shin – lyrics (track 5)
- Sam Merrifield – composition (track 5)
- Daniel Schulz – composition (track 5)
- Daniel Davidsen (PhD) – composition, arrangement (track 5)
- Peter Wallevik (PhD) – composition, arrangement (track 5)
- Min Yeon-jae – lyrics (track 6)
- Niclas Kings – composition, arrangement (track 6)
- Andy Love – composition, background vocals (track 6)
- Jeong Ju-hee – lyrics (track 7)
- Teddy Riley – composition (track 7)
- DOM – composition (track 7)
- Lee Hyun-seung – composition (track 7)
- J.SOL – composition (track 7)
- Hwang Seong-je – arrangement, bass, keyboard (track 7), vocal directing, background vocals, digital editing (track 3, 7)
- Kim Min-ji – lyrics (track 8)
- Daniel Traynor – composition, arrangement (track 8)
- Jess Morgan – composition, arrangement (track 8)
- Jack Morgan – composition, arrangement (track 8)
- Coach & Sendo – composition, arrangement (track 8)
- Hwang Yoo-bin – lyrics (track 9)
- Young Chance – composition (track 9)
- Voradory – composition, arrangement, drums, keyboards (track 9)
- Lee Hyo-jae – lyrics (track 10)
- Im Su-ran – lyrics (track 10)
- Zaydro – composition, arrangement, bass, guitar, strings arrangement (track 10)
- Won Seong-yeon – background vocals (track 3)
- Jeon Seung-woo – vocal directing, background vocals (track 5–6)
- Kang Tae-woo a.k.a. Soulman – background vocals (track 7)
- Maxx Song – vocal directing, digital editing (track 8)
- Ju Chan-yang (Pollen) – background vocals (track 8)
- Seo Mi-rae – vocal directing, digital editing (track 9–10), background vocals (track 9)
- Byun Jang-moon – background vocals (track 9–10)
- Sam Lee – guitar (track 2)
- Jung Dong-yoon – drums (track 7)
- Jung Soo-min – guitar (track 7)
- Choi Hoon – bass (track 9)
- Hong Jun-ho – guitar (track 9)
- Yung – strings (track 9)
- Nile Lee – strings conducting, strings arrangement (track 9)
- Noh Min-ji – recording (track 1, 4–5), digital editing (track 5), engineered for mix (track 5, 7, 9)
- Eugene Kwon – recording (track 1, 3, 7)
- Kim Hyun-gon – recording (track 1, 3–4, 7–10)
- Kim Ye-ji – recording (track 3–4, 8–10)
- Jang Woo-young – recording (track 4, 8), digital editing (track 6, 8)
- Lee Ji-hong – recording (track 4–6), digital editing (track 4), engineered for mix (track 4, 10), mixing (track 10)
- Kang Eun-ji – recording (track 4), engineered for mix (track 1, 3, 6, 8)
- Lee Chang-sun – recording (track 9)
- Jeong Ki-hong – recording (track 9)
- Choi Da-in – recording (track 9)
- Jung Eui-seok – mixing (track 1, 8)
- Kim Cheol-sun – mixing (track 3, 6–7)
- Lee Min-kyu – mixing (track 4)
- Nam Koong-jin – mixing (track 5, 9)
- Kwon Nam-woo – mastering (track 1, 3–10)
- Jeon Hoon – mastering (track 2)

== Release history ==
Release history for The Renaissance
Region	Date	Format	Label
South Korea	March 16, 2021	CD	SM; Label SJ; Dreamus
Various	March 16, 2021	Digital download; streaming	SM; Label SJ
