= Eranga =

Eranga is both a given name and a surname. Notable people with the name include:

- Eranga Rathnayake (born 1992), Sri Lankan cricketer
- Achira Eranga (born 1987), Sri Lankan cricketer
- Amila Eranga (born 1986), Sri Lankan cricketer
- Romesh Eranga (born 1985), Sri Lankan cricketer
- Shaminda Eranga (born 1986), Sri Lankan cricketer
- Tharindu Eranga, Sri Lankan footballer
- Ujitha Eranga, Sri Lankan cricketer
