= House Party (Super Junior song) =

2021 single by Super Junior

- Promotional photo for "House Party"

Single by Super Junior

from the album The Renaissance
- Language: Korean
- Released: March 16, 2021
- Studio: SM Booming System (Seoul)
- Genre: Disco-pop; Dance
- Length: 4:01
- Label: SM; Label SJ; Dreamus
- Composers: Christian Fast; Didrik Thott; Sebastian Thott; Yoo Young-jin
- Lyricist: Yoo Young-jin
- Producer: Lee Soo-man

Super Junior singles chronology
"The Melody" (2020)	"House Party" (2021)	"Callin'" (2022)

Music video
- "House Party" on YouTube
- "House Party" – House version on YouTube
- "House Party" – Alone version on YouTube

"House Party" is a song recorded by South Korean boy band Super Junior for their tenth Korean studio album, The Renaissance (2021). The song was composed and arranged by Christian Fast, Didrik and Sebastian Thott, and Yoo Young-jin. It was released as the album's title track on March 16, 2021, by SM Entertainment, Label SJ, and Dreamus, following the revelation of multiple teaser posters in the preceding weeks. The lyrics were penned solely by Yoo, and heavily refer to social distancing rules implemented during the COVID-19 pandemic.

Upon its release, the song received positive reviews from critics for its pandemic theme, including from the director-general of the World Health Organization (WHO), Dr. Tedros Adhanom. It peaked at number 99 on the Billboard K-Pop Hot 100, and at number 21 on the World Digital Song Sales charts. An accompanying music video, directed by Kim Ja-kyeong, premiered the same day as the song's release. Two further music videos, directed by one of the band members, Shindong, were released on March 29, 2021, after the original visual was viewed over 10 million times on YouTube. Super Junior had performed the song on multiple events, including at the 2021 edition of The Fact Music Awards and at the SM Town Live 2022: SMCU Express at Kwangya concert.

== Background and release ==
In October 2020, Label SJ announced that Super Junior will be releasing their tenth album The Renaissance in December 2020, with its pre-release single "The Melody" to be issued on the band's 15th debut anniversary on November 6. However, the album's release date was pushed back from December 2020 to January 2021 for the sake of its quality. The release was further delayed to February 2021 due to issues regarding the preparation of the album's title track. In February, Label SJ announced the third and final postponement, setting the album and the title track's release date to March 16, 2021.

On March 2, 2021, it was confirmed that a single entitled "House Party" will serve as the album's title track through the revelation of two teaser posters with opposing themes, a colourful "party" theme and a dark "trap" one. Subunit teaser posters were sequentially released starting from March 3. Passionate unit's poster consisting of Leeteuk, Siwon, and Donghae was released on the date, versatile unit consisting of Eunhyuk, Kyuhyun, and Shindong on March 4, and beautiful unit consisting of Heechul, Yesung, and Ryeowook on March 5, 2021. On March 9, "House Party" was confirmed to be the second track on The Renaissance after the album's tracklist was revealed. The single was digitally released at 6 pm on March 16, 2021.

"Burn The Floor", a fusion dance-pop track with hints of classical sounds, was originally selected to be the title track for the album. However, it was replaced by "House Party" as the band wanted the listeners to be able to listen to bright and enjoyable music when they are feeling tired and depressed. In addition, the band also admitted they felt that songwriter Yoo Young-jin is able to reinterpret the song in their style.

... while preparing "Burn The Floor" as the title song, a better song "House Party" appeared, we contemplate a lot [about it] and delayed it, so it [only] came out now.

— Shindong on the song's selection as the leading track.

The dance number for "House Party" was choreographed by Ryu Jae-joon, an experienced choreographer who has worked on numerous K-pop songs including NCT's "Resonance" and Kang Daniel's "Jealous". The band revealed that it took them three hours to learn the choreography as they kept getting distracted during the practice session.

== Composition and lyrics ==
"House Party"
Excerpt from the song, highlighting the transition from disco-pop to trap.

"House Party" was composed and arranged by Christian Fast, and Didrik and Sebastian Thott, and Yoo Young-jin. Musically, "House Party" is a disco-pop song with rhythms and guitar riffs. The song has also been described as a dance song infused with trendy melodies and traps. It is composed in the key of C major, with the tempo of 115 beats per minute. IDN Times described the song as upbeat and containing relatable lyrics, while Park Dong-seon of Sports World summarised the song as a "combination of Super Junior's music colour". Yoo, who wrote the song's lyrics, had worked extensively with Super Junior before, having written many of their title tracks such as "Don't Don" (2008), "Sorry, Sorry" (2009), "Bonamana" (2010), "Mr. Simple" (2011), and "Mamacita" (2014). Lee Soo-man, music producer and the founder of SM Entertainment, actively participated in the song's production, and was responsible for suggesting the addition of trap section in the middle of the song. The song underwent many rearrangements before it was ready to be released.

The lyrics of "House Party" contain a hopeful message, encouraging the listeners to stay positive during the COVID-19 pandemic. It also heavily references the social distancing rules implemented during the pandemic, delivering a strong reminder to stay at home and obey the rules despite being exhausted as the situation is almost returning to normal. In particular, one verse speaks about maintaining one meter distance between each other and about the importance of wearing masks. It also discusses the consequences of ignoring the rules, which will trigger a butterfly effect. During the trap part of the song, Heechul raps about restricting oneself from carrying out selfish actions such as travelling due to the danger of being outside during the ongoing pandemic. In an interview, Eunhyuk opined, "K-pop songs can reflect their era, so [he thought] that the message of the song is also important."

== Reception and impact ==
Lee Nam-kyung of MBN stated that while the song preserves Super Junior's unique style, it is also meaningful due to having "stimulated curiosity as it contained advice and actions in line with the COVID-19 pandemic era in its lyrics and choreography". He praised the song's choreography that includes the gesture of using hand sanitizer and polite greetings, which he described as "perfect for this situation". Ha Na-yeong of The Chosun Ilbo described the song as "addictive" and having "exciting rhythm and guitar riff". She also commented that the lyrics are "pleasant" and a mix of honest description of the pandemic, "support for the weary", and "encouragement to stop deviance" for a moment. Kim Soo-kyung of the Korea Economic Daily said that Super Junior released a song that highlighted a "pleasant and fun atmosphere", befitting its title, and "gives hope in the most SuJu-like way". Dissecting the lyrics, she said they are "impressive" due to capturing the reality of living a daily life changed by COVID-19. She concluded that the band can always be relied on to release "nourishing tonic" such as "House Party". Lee Hong-hyun, writing for IZM, commented that the song "illuminates the characters of a friendly team and injects bright energy into everyday life". He also complimented the song's composition, saying that "the structure that connects funk and trap [parts] breaks the monotony".

The song gained attention from the director-general of the World Health Organization (WHO) Dr. Tedros Adhanom Ghebreyesus who praised the band's effort of reminding the public to maintain precautionary measures against COVID-19 with the message. It also received recognition from the Indonesian Ministry of Health, who used the song as an encouragement towards the public to adhere to social distancing restrictions. In October 2021, seven-month after its release, the song was played as the background music for the fountain show at The Palm Fountain, the largest musical fountain in the world, located in Palm Jumeirah, United Arab Emirates, in conjunction with South Korea's tourism event Feel Korea 2021. The fountain show is scheduled to run for a year from October 15, 2021, onwards. The National named the song as one of the best K-pop songs of 2021.

== Commercial performance ==
"House Party" debuted at number 107 on the Gaon Digital Chart for the week of March 14–20, 2021, following its release. Meanwhile, the song debuted and peaked on number eight on the component Download Chart issue dated March 14–20, 2021. It stayed for three weeks on the chart, positioning at numbers 23 and 90 in the following weeks. The song also reached number 27 on the monthly Gaon Download Chart, in the chart published for the month of March 2021. The song entered the Billboard K-Pop Hot 100 at number 99 on the chart issue dated April 3, 2021.

In United States, the song debuted on the World Digital Song Sales chart at number 25. It peaked at number 21 on the chart released for the week of April 3, 2021. The song marked Super Junior's 27th entry on the World Digital Song Sales chart. On the other hand, the "House Party" music video charted at third place on the K-Pop Radar weekly chart after recording 12.4 million views in the week following its release, just behind Rosé's "On the Ground" and BTS's "Dynamite".

== Live performances ==
Super Junior first performed "House Party" on the special program Super Junior Comeback Show House Party that was televised on cable channel Mnet on March 16, 2021. In the program, the band looked back at their journey from joining SM Entertainment until the release of The Renaissance. Super Junior performed "House Party" on music programs shortly following its release. On March 18, 2021, the band performed the song on M Countdown. They performed both "House Party" and "Burn The Floor" on Show! Music Core on March 20. Super Junior performed twice on KBS2's music show, Music Bank. On March 19, 2021, the band's first performance was accompanied with a thank you message dedicated towards the medical frontliners who were working to contain the COVID-19 pandemic. Their second performance was on March 26. They also performed the song on SBS TV's Inkigayo on March 21, 2021.

Super Junior performed the ASMR version of "House Party" for the web variety show After Dad Falls Asleep, which aired on March 18, 2021. The band also appeared on the late night talk show You Hee-yeol's Sketchbook on March 19, 2021, performing "House Party" after a medley of "U", "Sorry, Sorry", and "Devil". Super Junior also performed the song while in-character for their web variety show SJ Global which aired on March 26, 2021. They performed the song on stage at The Fact Music Awards in October 2021, where they won three awards. The band also performed the song for an event held in conjunction with the 20th anniversary of Transmedia, an Indonesian television channel, in December 2021. On January 1, 2022, they performed "House Party" for the online concert SM Town Live 2022: SMCU Express at Kwangya, held by SM Entertainment. The song was performed in front of a live audience for the first time at the Super Junior Japan Special Event 2022: Return of The King on April 2, more than a year since its release. It was also included in the setlist of their world tour Super Show 9: Road, which commenced on July 15, 2022, at Jamsil Indoor Stadium in Seoul, South Korea.

== Promotion ==
Label SJ released three music video teasers in between March 10 and 15, 2021. The music video for "House Party" was released on March 16, the same day as the single. It revolved around the nine band members staying optimistic during the pandemic by adapting to the new normal and throwing a house party. Directed by Kim Ja-kyoung from Flexible Pictures, it features a conflict between two contrasting sides of Super Junior, the vivid and colourful "party side" who enjoyed partying, and the dark "trap side" who wanted to stop it from happening. Band member Kyuhyun summarised the music video's concept as "Super Junior vs. Super Junior". CGI technique was used to simulate backgrounds in the music video. Ha Na-yeong of The Chosun Ilbo said she liked the execution of its music video, as it "evoked nostalgia" with imagery of activities that could be carried out prior to the pandemic, which were "taken for granted". Around 2 am on March 25, 2021, the band leader Leeteuk posted a screenshot of a scene from the music video with the caption "What is this?", sparking speculations about supernatural presence at the filming set. However, an official from Label SJ clarified that it was probably a reflection from a staff working in the passageway next to the set. The music video surpassed 10 million views on YouTube 65 hours after it was released. To commemorate the occasion, the band released two special videos on March 29, 2021, which were directed by Shindong.

Donghae, Eunhyuk, Shindong, and Ryeowook appeared on JTBC's streaming television program Hal Myung Soo on March 19, 2021, where the host Park Myung-soo, a veteran singer-songwriter, analysed the lyrics and melody of "House Party" before attempting to rewrite its lyrics in his own style. On March 20, 2021, Eunhyuk and Shindong made an appearance on the variety show Amazing Saturday to promote "House Party". Eunhyuk guested with Leeteuk on Omniscient Interfering View on March 19, 2021, where he demonstrated the key-point of the song's choreography. A few behind-the-scenes shots from the music video filming were also revealed in the reality-observational talk show.

== Credits and personnel ==
Credits are adapted from the liner notes of The Renaissance.

Studio

- SM Booming System – recording, digital editing, engineered for mix, mixing
- Sonic Korea – mastering

Personnel

- Label SJ – executive producer
- SM Entertainment – executive supervisor
- Lee Soo-man – producer
- Tak Young-jun – production director
- Super Junior – vocals, background vocals
- Yoo Young-jin – lyrics, composition, arrangement, vocal directing, background vocals, recording, digital editing, engineered for mix, mixing, music and sound supervisor
- Christian Fast – composition, arrangement
- Didrik Thott – composition, arrangement
- Sebastian Thott – composition, arrangement
- Sam Lee – guitar
- Jeon Hoon – mastering

== Charts ==
Chart performance for "House Party"
Chart (2021)	Peak position
South Korea (Gaon Digital Chart)	107
South Korea (K-Pop Hot 100)	99
US World Digital Song Sales (Billboard)	21

== Release history ==
Release dates and formats for "House Party"
Region	Date	Format(s)	Label(s)	Ref.
Various	March 16, 2021	Digital download; streaming	SM; Label SJ; Dreamus	
