= Last Scene (EP) =

2022 EP by Chen

- Digital cover

EP by Chen
- Released: November 14, 2022
- Recorded: 2022
- Studios: Brickwall (Seoul); Doobdoob (Seoul); MonoTree (Seoul); Mospick (Seoul); Seoul; SM Blue Cup (Seoul); SM LVYIN (Seoul); SM Starlight (Seoul)
- Genres: Pop; R&B
- Length: 23:02
- Language: Korean
- Labels: SM; Dreamus
- Producers: Lee Soo-man; B-Rock; Honey Pot; Brian Cho; Brad Ellis; Choi Jin-won; J-Lin; DK Choo; Hollin; Prime Time

Chen chronology
Dear My Dear (2019)	Last Scene (2022)	Polaris (2023)

Singles from Last Scene
- 1. "Last Scene" Released: November 14, 2022

Music videos
- "Last Scene" on YouTube

Last Scene is the third EP by South Korean singer and songwriter Chen. It was released in digital and physical format by SM Entertainment and distributed by Dreamus on November 14, 2022. The EP features six tracks in total, including the lead single of the same name.

== Background ==
After serving one and half years in mandatory military service, Chen was officially discharged from his duties on April 25, 2022, after enlisting back on October 26, 2020. Four months later, he made appearances at SM Town Live 2022: SMCU Express concert from August 20–29 in Suwon's World Cup Stadium and in Tokyo Dome, performing "Beautiful Goodbye", one of his previously released singles.

On October 10, Exo's official Twitter account announced that Chen will release a mini-album called Last Scene that will be released on October 31, marking Chen's first comeback since Dear My Dear in 2019. The tweet shows a picture of a man sitting in a scenery dominated by green and yellow colors, the artwork has a similar feel to Chen's previous release artwork poster. Pre-orders of the album commenced in the following day on October 11 at online and offline record stores. On October 28, SM Entertainment announced that actor Park Hae-soo would appear in the music video of lead single, "Last Scene", and the teaser from the music video is scheduled to be uploaded on October 29.

However, the album's release was postponed due to the Itaewon Halloween Tragedy, and would instead be released on November 14.

On November 14, the lead single and its music video was released alongside the EP. During an online press conference, Chen stated the reason for the EP's release was due to the singer had not greeted the fans in awhile with a new album.

== Composition ==
Speaking of the EP's production, Chen stated "I hope that those who listen to my songs will like the positive vibe that I've worked hard to create." The singer added that he had a lot of reflection over "who he is" and "what kind of a person he is". The album is treated as a new start for the singer with an intention to show people more of his narratives. Chen also added that not all songs in this EP are gloomy, stating that each song has their own personalities.

The EP begins with its lead single "Last Scene", which the singer described as a ballad song that goes well with the autumn season, since its lyrics explain how a breakup fades away. The second track, "Photograph", is a mid-tempo ballad with the lyrics reminiscing the singer's childhood experiences. It was later revealed on "Chen FM", that the song was originally pitched to bandmate Xiumin for his debut extended play, Brand New, although the latter eventually opted to feature "Love Letter" instead. The third track, "Traveler" is an R&B song describing the singer's desire to escape boredom and going on a trip with the loved ones.

"I Don't Even Mind" is a pop song penned by Chen himself, conveying a dilemma of expressing one's feelings yet cautious for the sake of others. The remaining two tracks "Reminisce" and "Your Shelter" are ballad songs. The former describes letting out emotions during breakup, while the latter talks about the desire of being with someone going through hard times.

== Promotion ==
Chen promoted the EP by performing its lead single "Last Scene" in various music program starting at KBS' Music Bank on November 25. On November 26, he appeared in MBC's Show! Music Core. On November 27, he performed in SBS' Inkigayo. Chen along with his Exo bandmates were confirmed to be part of the acts for SM Town Live 2023: SMCU Palace at Kwangya, marking the first time the single was performed live in a concert.

The songs on the EP were featured on the set list of the Chen Japan Tour 2023.

== Commercial performance ==
The EP debuted at number one on the South Korean Circle Album Chart with over 85,000 copies sold in its debut week. In Japan, the EP sold over 2,000 copies within its first week.

== Track listing ==
Last Scene track listing
No.	Title	Lyrics	Music	Arrangement	Length
1.	"Last Scene" (사라지고 있어; Sarajigo isseo; 'It's disappearing')	Honey Jar	Honey Jar	Honey Jar	4:22
2.	"Photograph" (옛 사진; Yet sajin; 'Old photos')	Royal Dive	Brian Cho; Royal Dive	Brian Cho	3:58
3.	"Traveler"	Hollin (MonoTree)	Hollin (MonoTree); Choi Jin-won	Hollin (MonoTree); Choi Jin-won	2:43
4.	"I Don't Even Mind"	Kim Jong-dae	Bradford Ellis; Etham Basden; Sam Merrifield; Hautboi Rich	Bradford Ellis; Etham Basden; Sam Merrifield; Hautboi Rich	3:15
5.	"Reminisce" (그렇게 살아가면 돼요; Geureoke saragamyeon dwaeyo; 'You can live like that')	Chu Dae-kwan (MonoTree); MosPick	Chu Dae-kwan (MonoTree); MosPick	Chu Dae-kwan (MonoTree	4:42
6.	"Your Shelter" (계단창; Gyedanchang; 'Stair window')	B-Rock (Number K); J-Lin (Number K)	B-Rock (Number K); J-Lin (Number K)	B-Rock (Number K); J-Lin (Number K); Prime Time	4:00
Total length:					23:02

== Charts ==
Chart performance for Last Scene
Chart (2022)	Peak position
Japanese Albums (Oricon)	22
South Korean Albums (Circle)	1

== Release history ==
Release history for Last Scene
Region	Date	Format	Label
South Korea	November 14, 2022	CD	SM; Dreamus
Various	November 14, 2022	Digital download; streaming	SM
