= April, and a Flower =

- Digital cover

EP by Chen
- Released: April 1, 2019
- Recorded: 2019
- Studios: Doobdoob (Seoul); Seoul; SM Blue Cup (Seoul); SM LVYIN (Seoul)
- Genre: K-pop
- Length: 24:56
- Language: Korean
- Labels: SM; Dreamus
- Producer: Lee Soo-man

Chen chronology
April, and a Flower (2019)	Dear My Dear (2019)

Singles from April, and a Flower
- 1. "Beautiful Goodbye" Released: April 1, 2019

April, and a Flower (styled as April, and a flower; Korean: 사월, 그리고 꽃; RR: Sawol, geurigo kkot) is the debut extended play by South Korean singer and songwriter Chen. It was released on April 1, 2019 by SM Entertainment and distributed by Dreamus. The extended play features six songs including the hit lead single "Beautiful Goodbye". The album is available in three versions: April, Flower, and a standard Kihno version of the album.

== Background and release ==
On March 8, it was reported that Chen would release his first solo album in April. On March 19, the EP's title April, and a Flower, release date and art cover were revealed. The pre-order of the three versions of the EP started on the same day. On March 21, a detailed teaser photo of the EP schedule was released. On March 22, the track list and the album details were released.

On March 25, three image teasers of the singer were released. On March 26, additional three image teasers were released. On March 27, highlight medley of the EP was released. On March 29, three image teasers of the singer were released. On the same day, the first teaser of "Beautiful Goodbye" music video was released. On March 30, two additional teaser photos were released.

On April 1, the official music video of "Beautiful Goodbye" and the EP were released. On April 5, a vertical video of "Beautiful Goodbye" was released. On April 8, a visual video of "Flower" was released. On April 19, a handwritten video of "Beautiful Goodbye" was released, where fans of Chen participated in writing the lyrics of the song on papers, and a video collage was made of it.

== Promotion ==
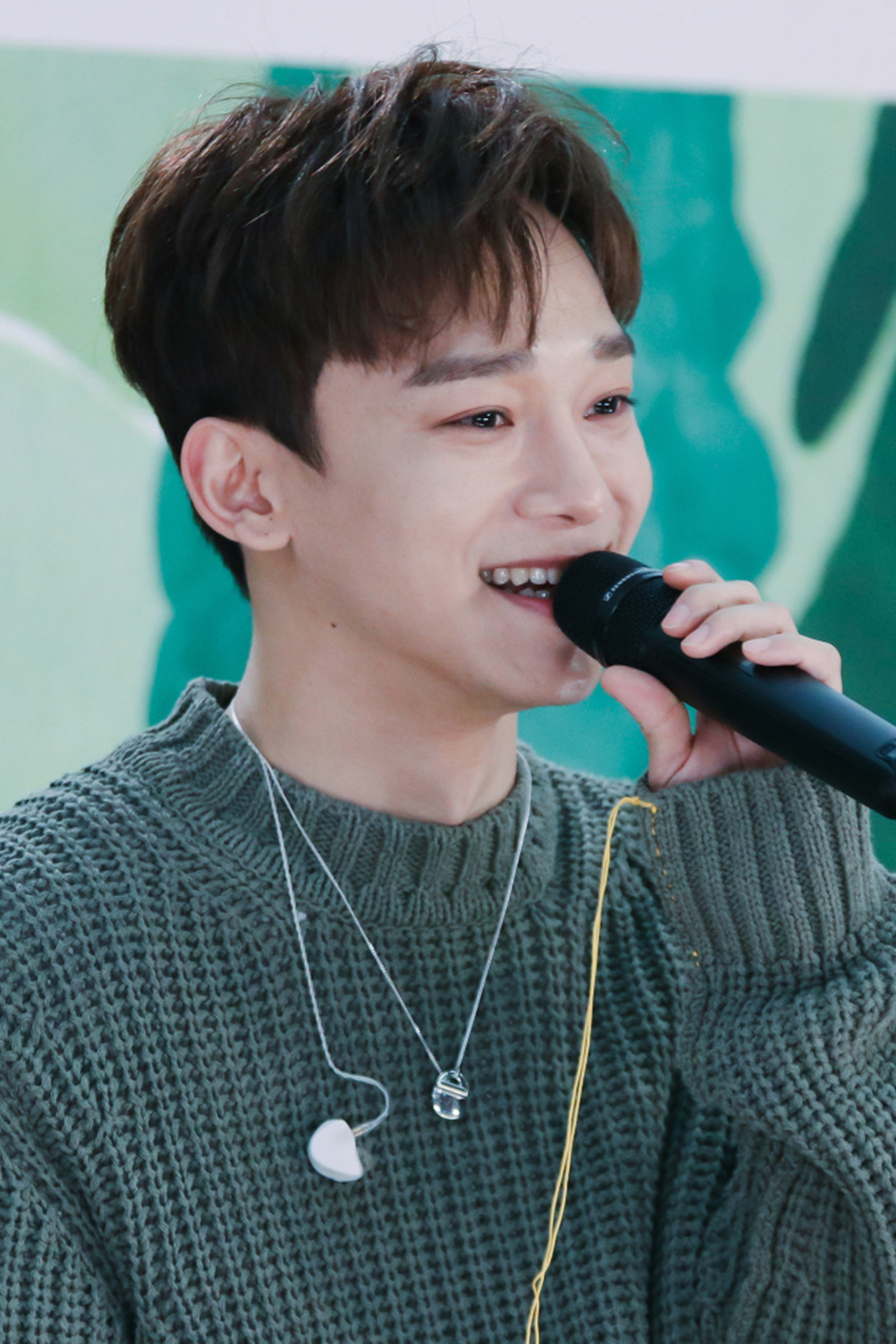
Chen in a showcase on April 1, 2019.

On April 1, Chen held a showcase where he talked about the process of making the EP and held a listening session of it, the singer also performed the lead single "Beautiful Goodbye" for the first time. On the same day he held a busking event titled "Chen's April Busking" at Coex Artium Mall where he discussed about each track of the EP with the fans, and performed "Sorry Not Sorry" and "Beautiful Goodbye". Chen started promoting on Korean music programs for one week starting from April 5, 2019 and resulted in achieving first place on two music programs. On April 6, The singer held a fansign in Sinchon, and on April 20, in Busan and Daegu.

== Track listing ==
No.	Title	Lyrics	Music	Arrangement	Length
1.	"Flower" (꽃; Kkot)	Kim Jong-dae; JQ	Kim Je-hwi	Kim Je-hwi	4:01
2.	"Beautiful Goodbye" (사월이 지나면 우리 헤어져요; Sawori jinamyeon uri heeojeoyo; 'After April, we are separated')	NIve (153/Joombas)	MooF (153/Joombas); Jisoo Park (153/Joombas)	MooF (153/Joombas)	4:29
3.	"Sorry Not Sorry" (하고 싶던 말; Hago sipdeon mal; 'What You Want to Say')	Paul Kim	Phenomenotes	Song Young-joo	4:26
4.	"Love Words" (사랑의 말; Sarangui mal; 'A Word of Love')	Kenzie	Kenzie	Kenzie	3:36
5.	"I'll Be There" (먼저 가 있을게; Meonjeo ga isseulge; 'I'll go first')	Min Yeon-jae	KingMing	KingMing	4:12
6.	"Portrait of You" (널 그리다; Neol geurida; 'I draw you')	Seo Ji-eum	Andreas Stone Johansson; Ricky Hanley	Andreas Stone Johansson	4:12
Total length:					25:04

== Charts ==
=== Weekly charts ===
Chart (2019)	Peak position
French Digital Albums (SNEP)	33
Japanese Albums (Oricon)	51
Japan Hot Albums (Billboard)	34
South Korean Albums (Gaon)	2
UK Album Downloads (Official Charts)	92
US Heatseekers Albums (Billboard)	7
US Independent Albums (Billboard)	33
US World Albums (Billboard)	3

=== Year-end charts ===
Chart (2019)	Position
South Korean Albums (Gaon)	29

== Sales ==
Region	Sales
South Korea	212,252
Japan	3,220
United States	1,000

== Accolades ==
Awards
Year	Organization	Award	Nominated work	Result	Ref
2020	Golden Disc Awards	Disc Bonsang	April, and a Flower	Nominated	
2020	Golden Disc Awards	Digital Bonsang	"Beautiful Goodbye"	Nominated	

Music show awards
Song	Program	Date	Ref.
"Beautiful Goodbye"	Show! Music Core (MBC)	April 13, 2019	
"Beautiful Goodbye"	Inkigayo (SBS)	April 14, 2019	

== Release history ==
Release history for April, and a Flower
Region	Date	Format	Label
South Korea	April 1, 2019	CD	SM; Dreamus
Various	April 1, 2019	Digital download; streaming	SM
