= 2015 Gayo Daejun Limited Edition =

EP by Various Artists
- Released: December 28, 2015
- Genres: Ballad; dance
- Language: Korean
- Label: SBS Contents Hub

2015 Gayo Daejun Limited Edition (Korean: 2015 가요대전 Limited Edition) it is an extended play recorded by various artists to major annual end-of-the-year music program Gayo Daejun broadcast by Seoul Broadcasting System (SBS).

== Track listing ==
| No. | Title | Vocals | Length |
|---|---|---|---|
| 1. | "난 괜찮아" (I Will Survive) | Luna; Solar; Ailee; Eunji |
| 2. | "사랑했지만" (Though I Loved You) | Chen |
| 3. | "비처럼 음악처럼" (Like Rain, Like Music) | Baekhyun |
| 4. | "사랑하기 때문에" (Because I Love You) | Taemin |
