= Door (EP) =

- Digital cover

EP by Chen
- Released: May 28, 2024
- Studios: Doobdoob (Seoul); Seoul; Vibe Music 606 (Seoul)
- Genre: K-pop
- Length: 21:35
- Language: Korean
- Labels: INB100; Dreamus

Chen chronology
Polaris (2023)	Door (2024)

Singles from Door
- 1. "Empty" Released: May 28, 2024

Door is the fourth Korean-language EP by South Korean singer and songwriter Chen, released on May 28, 2024, by INB100 and distributed by Dreamus. The EP features six tracks in total, including the lead single "Empty".

== Background ==
Door is Chen's first EP since he and his Exo (and Exo-CBX) bandmates Xiumin and Baekhyun moved from SM Entertainment to the agency INB100. Chen stated that he "thought a lot about which songs to put in the album", and wanted to give fans "hope" with the lead single, "Empty".

== Commercial performance ==
The EP debuted at number four on the South Korean Circle Album Chart, selling over 71,000 copies in its first week.

== Track listing ==
Door track listing
No.	Title	Lyrics	Music	Arrangement	Length
1.	"Empty" (빈 집)	Chen; Chancellor; Knave; N0ise	Chen; Chancellor; Knave; N0ise	Chancellor; N0ise	4:04
2.	"Dandelion" (꽃씨)	Chen; Baekhyun; Chancellor; Knave; Or&	Chancellor; Knave; Or&	Chancellor; Or&	4:12
3.	"Playlist" (featuring Haon and Be'O)	Chen; Haon; Be'O; Rookie 81; Duble Sidekick	Chen; Haon; Be'O; Colde; Stally; Park Gyu-tae; Rookie 81; Duble Sidekick	Colde; Stally; Park Gyu-tae	3:10
4.	"Fall in Love Again"	Chen	Collapsedone; Justin Reinstein	Collapsedone; Reinstein	3:36
5.	"Starlight" (별빛 저 너머의 너머의 너머의 별)	Rookie 81; Park Jang-geun	Factist; Wooziq	Factist; Wooziq	3:32
6.	"Remember" (회상)	Chen; Park Ji-soo (Chapter M)	NIve (Chapter M); I.vin (Chapter M)	I.vin	3:01
Total length:					21:35

== Charts ==
=== Weekly charts ===
Weekly chart performance for Door
Chart (2024)	Peak position
Japanese Digital Albums (Oricon)	45
Japanese Hot Albums (Billboard Japan)	98
South Korean Albums (Circle)	4

=== Monthly charts ===
Monthly chart performance for Door
Chart (2024)	Position
South Korean Albums (Circle)	18

== Release history ==
Release history for Door
Region	Date	Format	Label
South Korea	May 28, 2024	CD	INB100; Dreamus
Various	May 28, 2024	Digital download; streaming	INB100; Dreamus
