= Dear My Dear =

- Digital cover

EP by Chen
- Released: October 1, 2019
- Recorded: 2019
- Studio: Doobdoob (Seoul); Jukjae (Seoul); Prelude (Seoul); Seoul; SM Blue Cup (Seoul); SM LVYIN (Seoul)
- Genre: Pop
- Length: 22:00
- Language: Korean
- Label: SM; Dreamus
- Producer: Lee Soo-man

Chen chronology
April, and a Flower (2019)	Dear My Dear (2019)	Last Scene (2022)

Singles from Dear My Dear
- 1. "Shall We?" Released: October 1, 2019

Dear My Dear (styled as Dear my dear) (Korean: 사랑하는 그대에게; RR: saranghaneun geudaeege) is the second extended play by South Korean singer and songwriter Chen. It was digitally and physically released on October 1, 2019, by SM Entertainment and distributed by Dreamus. The title track "Shall We?" and its accompany music video were released along with the extended play.

== Background and release ==
On August 29, it was reported that Chen would release a new album in early October. On September 11, the title and cover was revealed. The official release date was revealed to be October 1, 2019, and the online pre-order for both versions of the album began. On September 20, the teaser schedule of the album was revealed. On September 21, the track list of the EP was revealed. On September 22, a photo teaser was also revealed. On September 23, it was revealed that the title track is "Shall We?". On September 24, a highlight medley of the tracks "Amaranth", "Hold You Tight" and "You Never Know" was released, along with five photo teasers of the singer. On the same day, the album details were released. On September 25, five photo teaser were released. On September 26, a highlight medley of the tracks "Shall We?", "My Dear" and "Good Night" was released. On the same day, another five photo teasers of Chen were released. On September 27, additional four photo teasers were released. On the same day, the first teaser of "Shall We?" music video was released. On September 28, four cropped photo teasers of Chen were released. On September 29, four photo teasers were released. On the same day, the second teaser of "Shall We?" music video was released. On September 30, two photo teasers were released. On the same day, "Shall We" interview of Chen was released. On October 1, at midnight, "Shall We?" music video was officially released. On October 1–3, "Shall We?" music video behind photos were released. On October 5, jacket making film video for the dear version of the album was released. On October 6, a jacket making film for my dear version of the album was released. On October 7, a jacket making film for dear my dear version was released. On October 8, a close up cam video of "Shall We?" music video was released.

== Composition and production ==
"Shall We?", produced by Kenzie, is described as a retro pop song that combines a sophisticated mood and romantic melody created by standard classic pop arrangements and lyrics about love. "Amaranth" is an impressive ballad with an acoustic guitar, with a message of longing and consoling your loved one. "Hold You Tight" is an acoustic song with a cheerful guitar sound, the lyrics express the warmth and relief of hugging your loved one. "You Never Know" is a ballad song that combines piano, double bass and drums, reminiscent of a jazz trio, combined with heartwarming lyrics about confessing to someone you love. "My Dear" is described as brilliantly developed britpop song. Chen participated in writing the lyrics of the song which draws attention to the farewell of a beautiful love story. "Good Night" is described as is a healing ballad with a warm message.

== Promotion ==
On October 1, before the album's release, Chen held a showcase event at Yes24 live hall in Seoul, South Korea for the media where he talked about the process of making the album. On the same day, one hour before the album's official release, Chen held a comeback showcase titled "Dear FM to you who I love" which was streamed live on Vlive app.

Chen will start promoting "Shall We?" on South Korean music shows on October 6.

On October 4, the singer held album fansign event at Yes24 live hall in Seoul. On October 8, Chen will hold a fansign event at Lotte World Tower Auditorium. On October 9, the singer will hold a fansign events in Busan and Daegu.

== Track listing ==
No.	Title	Lyrics	Music	Arrangement	Length
1.	"Shall We?" (우리 어떻게 할까요?; Uri eotteoke halkkayo?; 'What should we do?')	Kenzie	Kenzie	Kenzie	3:41
2.	"My Dear" (그대에게; Geudaeege; 'To you')	Kim Jong-dae; Kim Je-hwi	Kim Je-hwi	Kim Je-hwi	3:58
3.	"Amaranth" (고운 그대는 시들지 않으리; Goun geudaeneun sideulji aneuri; 'You, my beautiful one, will never wither')	Eun Jong-tae (CLEF); Cody J (CLEF); CLEF CREW	Eun Jong-tae (CLEF); Cody J (CLEF); Choi Cheon-gon (CLEF); CLEF CREW	Eun Jong-tae (CLEF); Choi Cheon-gon (CLEF)	3:16
4.	"Hold You Tight" (널 안지 않을 수 있어야지; Neol anji aneul su isseoyaji; 'I shouldn't be able to not hug you')	VERA (CLEF); CLEF CREW	VERA (CLEF); CLEF CREW	VERA CLEF	3:14
5.	"You Never Know" (그댄 모르죠; Geudaen moreujo; 'You don't know')	SNNNY(CLEF); CLEF CREW	SNNNY(CLEF); CLEF CREW	SNNNY(CLEF)	4:07
6.	"Good Night" (잘 자요; Jal jayo)	Min Yeon-jae	King's Choice; Kim Dong-hee; Benjamin 55	KingMing; Kim Dong-hee; Benjamin 55	3:39
Total length:					21:56

== Charts ==
=== Weekly charts ===
Chart (2019)	Peak position
French Digital Albums (SNEP)	45
Japanese Albums (Oricon)	36
Japan Hot Albums (Billboard Japan)	31
South Korean Albums (Gaon)	1
US World Albums (Billboard)	7

=== Year-end charts ===
Chart (2019)	Position
South Korean Albums (Gaon)	36

== Sales ==
Region	Sales
South Korea	169,570
China	52,413
Japan	1,902

== Awards and nominations ==
=== Music program awards ===
Song	Program	Date	Ref.
"Shall We?"	Music Bank (KBS)	October 11, 2019	
"Shall We?"	Show Champion (MBC)	October 23, 2019	

== Release history ==
Release history for Dear My Dear
Region	Date	Format	Label
South Korea	October 1, 2019	CD	SM; Dreamus
Various	October 1, 2019	Digital download; streaming	SM
