= Amila Kiriella =

Sri Lankan cricketer (born 1982)

Amila Kiriella (born 8 August 1982) was a Sri Lankan cricketer. He was a right-handed batsman and right-arm medium-pace bowler who played for Nondescripts. He was born in Colombo.

Kiriella made a single first-class appearance for the team, during the 2001–02 season, against Tamil Union. From the opening order, he scored 15 runs in the first innings in which he batted, and 18 runs in the second.
