= The Palm Fountain =

Artificial Musical Water Fountain

The Palm Fountain 棕櫚噴泉
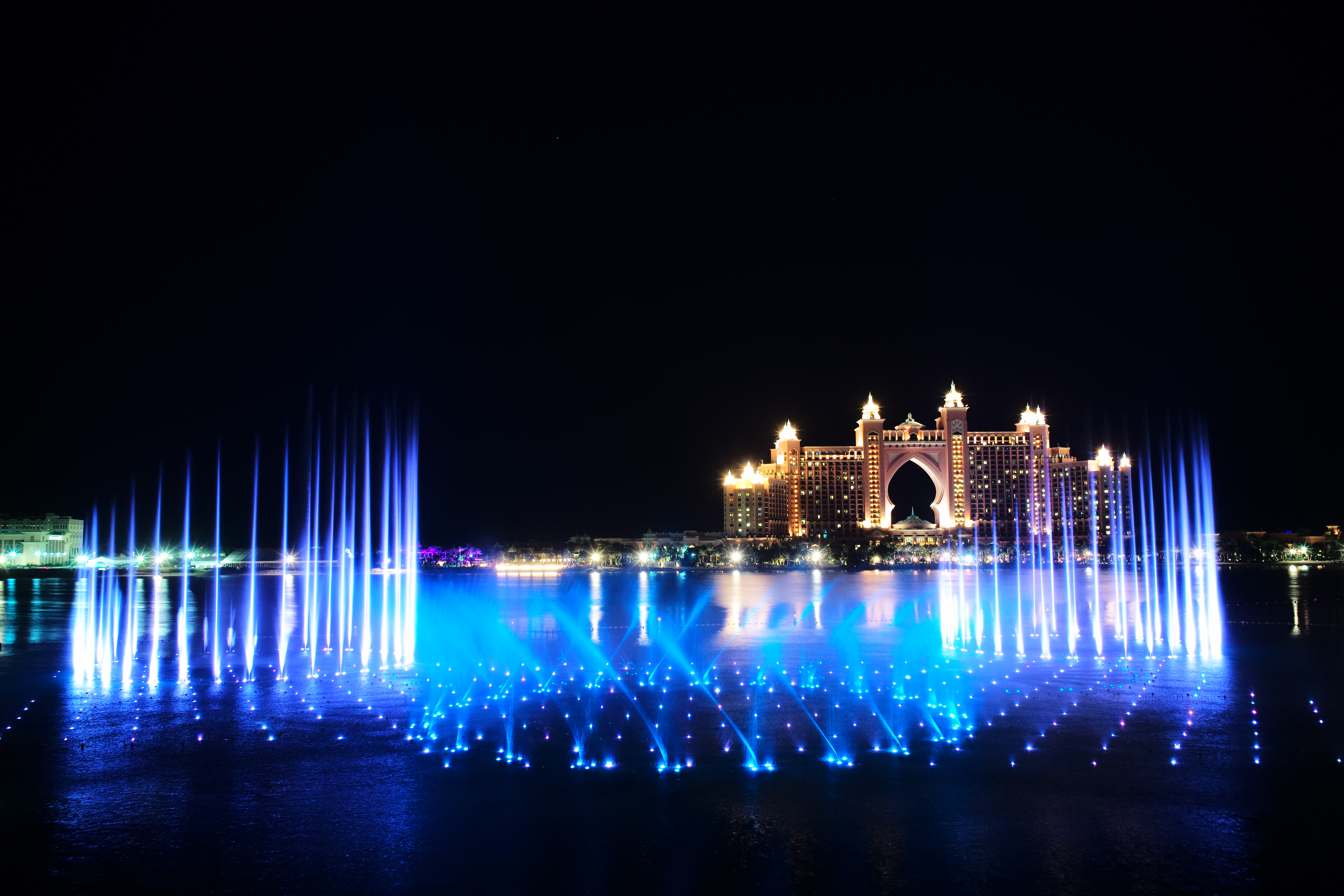

General information
- Status: Closed
- Location: The Pointe, Palm Jumeirah, Dubai, United Arab Emirates
- Coordinates: 25.128°N 55.123°E
- Opened: 20 October 2020
- Closed: 16 May 2023

The Palm Fountain (Arabic: نافورة النخلة) was an artificial fountain located at The Pointe shopping and dining district on Palm Jumeirah of Dubai, United Arab Emirates. Officially inaugurated on 22 October 2020, the Fountain was designed and built by Beijing Water Design Technology Co., Ltd., which is a China-based service provider of musical water fountains.

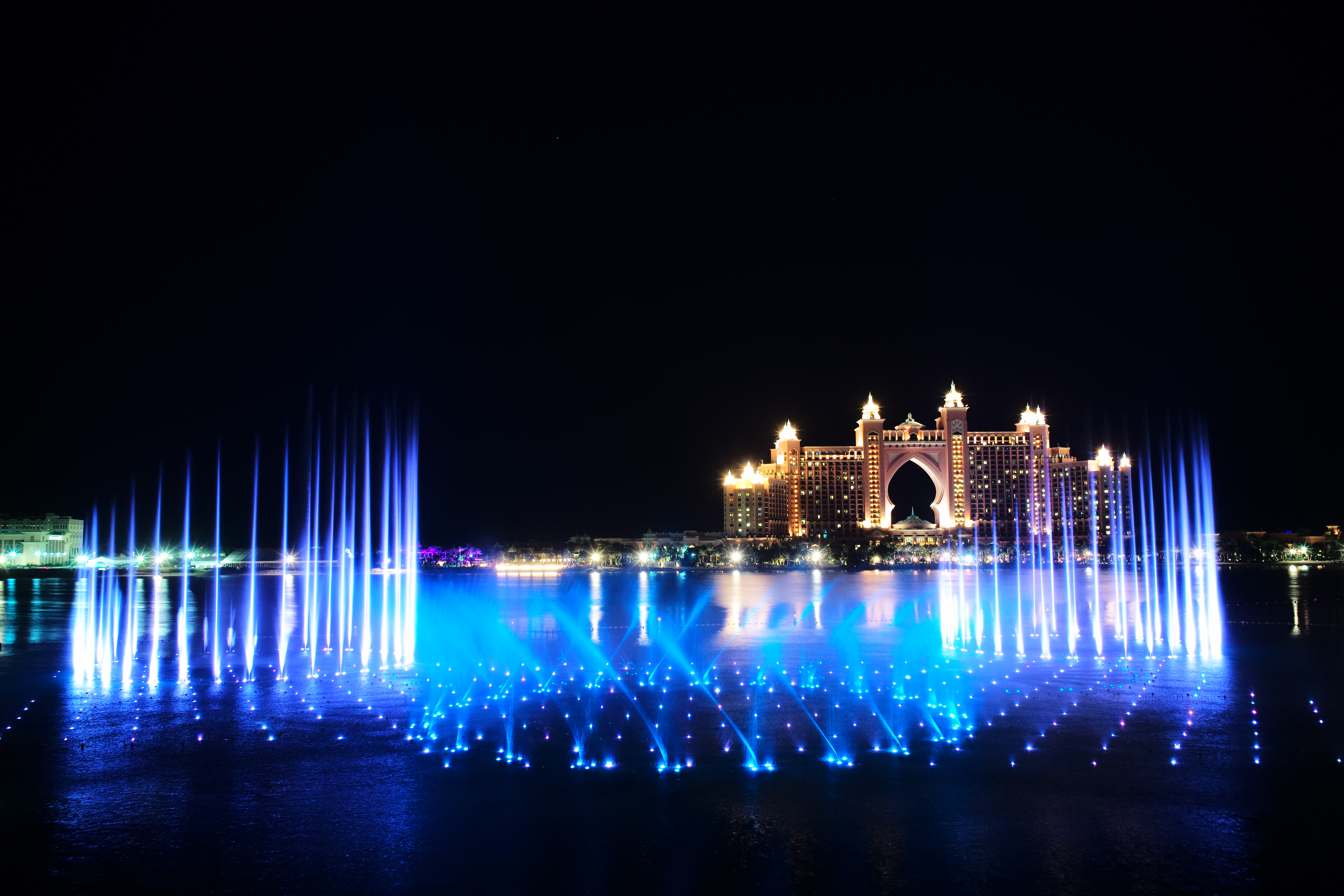
The Palm Fountain (γ)

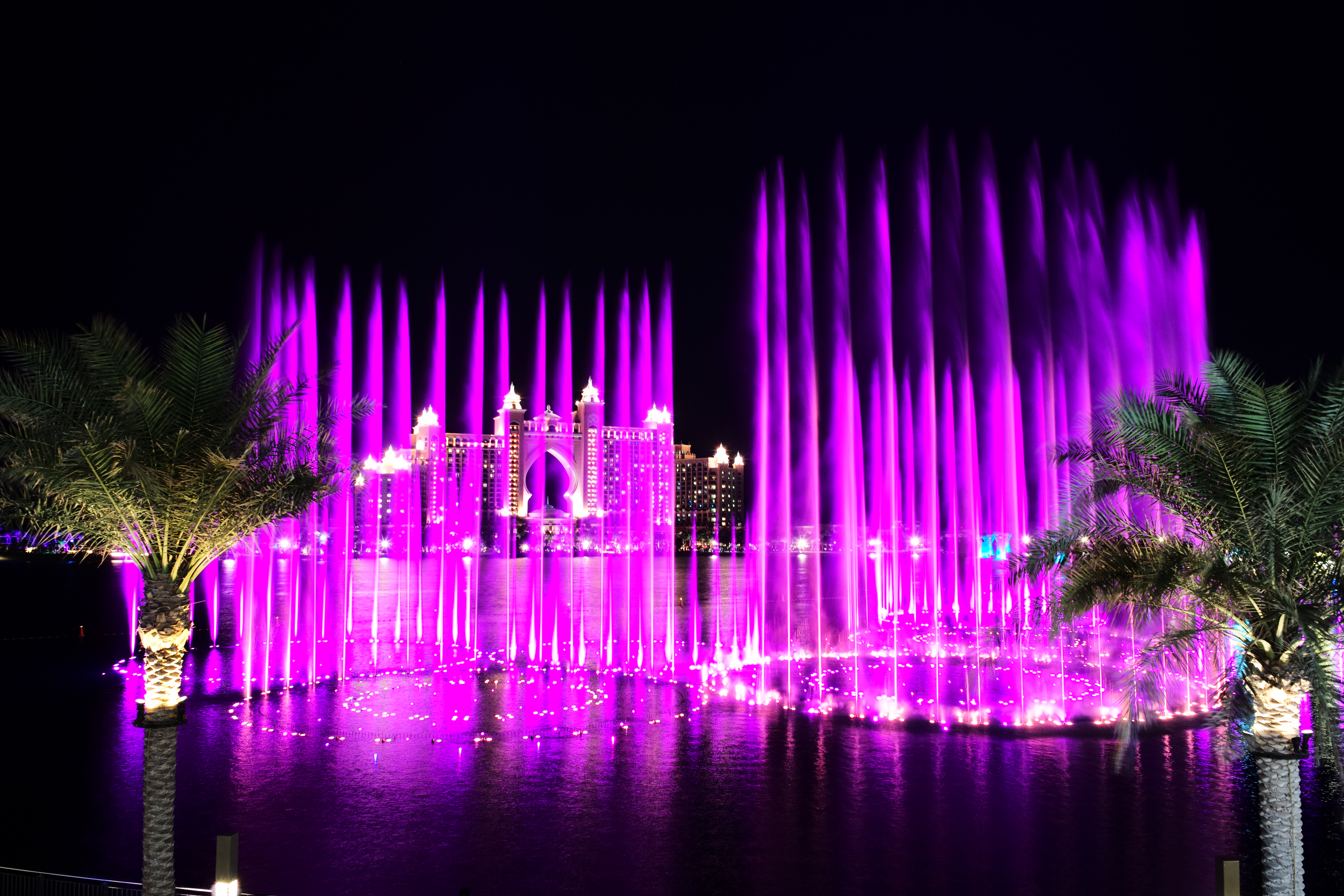
The Palm Fountain (α)

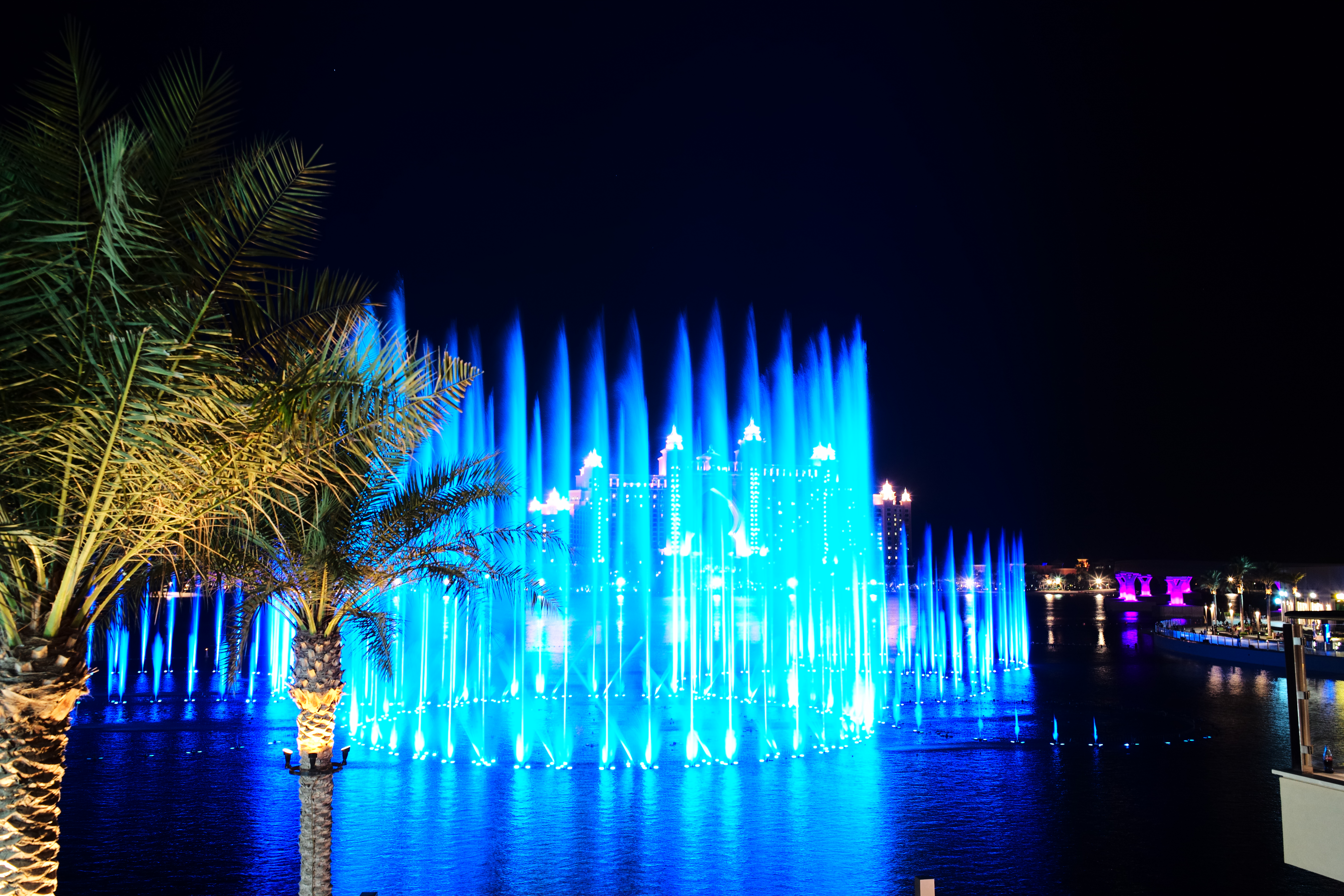
The Palm Fountain (β)

The Palm Fountain was the world's largest seawater musical fountain and has obtained the Guinness certificate of the world's largest musical fountain. It is equipped with shooters capable of spraying water up to 105 metres in the air and features over 3,000 LED lights.

In 2020 the owner commissioned Ihab Darwish, Emirati composer to compose an official song “Aim For The Sky” as a sonic brand and its signature music. The composition pays homage to the UAE's culture as well as capture Dubai's cosmopolitanism and is performed regularly at The Pointe, Dubai, from December 1, 2020.

"Aim For The Sky" mixes between cinematic and symphonic sounds reflecting the identity of the iconic The Palm Fountain. Along with delicate notes, the melody resembles ambition, strength, resilience, and the nostalgic side of the city. The piece is a tribute to the UAE's diverse people and culture, a musical dialogue infused with classical, khaleeji, oriental, and electronic styles to showcase the unity of all cultures under one sky.

Due to unfavorable weather conditions the fountain show was often canceled. The Palm Fountain officially closed on May 15, 2023.
