= Ujitha Eranga =

Sri Lankan cricketer

Ujitha Eranga was a Sri Lankan cricketer. He was a right-handed batsman and left-arm slow bowler who played for Moratuwa Sports Club.

Eranga made a single first-class appearance for the side, during the 2003–04 season, against Singha Sports Club. From the tailend, he scored a duck in the first innings in which he batted, and, when switched to the opening order in the second innings, scored 10 runs.

Eranga bowled a single over in the match, conceding 7 runs.
