= Universe (Exo EP) =

- Digital cover artwork

EP by Exo
- Released: December 26, 2017
- Studio: Doobdoob (Seoul); Iconic (Seoul); In Grid (Seoul); Lead (Seoul); SM Big Shot (Seoul); SM Blue Ocean (Seoul); SM LVYIN (Seoul); Sound Pool (Seoul)
- Genre: K-pop
- Length: 30:45
- Language: Korean; Mandarin; English
- Label: SM; Genie
- Producer: Lee Soo-man

Exo chronology
EXO PLANET #3-The EXO'rDIUM[dot] (2017)	Universe (2017)	Countdown (2018)

Singles from Universe
- 1. "Universe" Released: December 26, 2017

Universe (Korean: Universe – 겨울 스페셜 앨범, 2017; RR: Universe – gyeoul seupesyeol aelbeom, 2017; lit. Universe - Winter Special Album, 2017) is the sixth extended play by South Korean–Chinese boy band Exo. It was released by SM Entertainment on December 26, 2017, and is the group's first album to be released without a Chinese edition.

== Release ==
On December 14, 2017, Exo was announced to be releasing their sixth extended play and fourth "winter special" album titled Universe on December 21. Following the death of labelmate Jonghyun of Shinee, the album's release was postponed. Universe and the music video for its title track were eventually released on December 26, 2017.

== Single ==
The lead single "Universe" debuted at number one on the Melon Realtime Chart. "Universe", produced by Shin Hyuk and MRey, is described as a rock ballad that talks about how a person will search the universe just to find their lover. The single debuted at number two on the South Korean Gaon Digital Chart. It also topped the Billboard Korea Kpop Hot 100 for the first week of 2018.

== Promotion ==
Exo performed "Universe" for the first time on December 31 on MBC's year-end show, MBC Gayo Daejejeon.

== Reception ==
Upon release, Universe was praised by fans for using gender-neutral pronouns such as "me" and "you" instead of "he" and "she" in the lyrics.

=== Commercial performance ===
The album debuted atop the South Korean Gaon Album Chart and at number two on the Billboard World Albums Chart.

== Track listing ==
Universe track listing
No.	Title	Lyrics	Music	Arrangement	Length
1.	"Universe"	Sarah Yoon	Hyuk Shin (Joombas); Marco "MRey" Reyes (Joombas); JJ Evans (Joombas); Jeff Lewis	Joombas	4:24
2.	"Universe" (為心導航)	Xiaohan	Hyuk Shin (Joombas); Marco "MRey" Reyes (Joombas); JJ Evans (Joombas); Jeff Lewis	Joombas	4:24
3.	"Been Through" (Korean: 지나갈 테니; RR: Jinagal Teni; lit. It Will Pass)	Park Ji-hee (Makeumine Works); JQ (Makeumine Works)	Mike Woods (Rice N' Peas); Kevin White (Rice N' Peas); Brandyn "EMAN8" Burnette; Molly Moore; MZMC	Rice N' Peas	3:38
4.	"Stay"	JQ (Makeumine Works); Lee Ji-hye (Makeumine Works); Sik-K	Cathy Dennis; Robert Gerongco; Samuel Gerongco; Terence Lam	Kuya Productions	3:51
5.	"Fall"	JQ (Makeumine Works); Mola (Makeumine Works); MQ (BeatBurger)	Mike Woods (Rice N' Peas); Kevin White (Rice N' Peas); Andrew Bazzi (Rice N' Peas); MZMC	Rice N' Peas	3:27
6.	"Good Night"	Hyun Ji-won (Makeumine Works); JQ (Makeumine Works)	Mike Woods (Rice N' Peas); Kevin White (Rice N' Peas); MZMC; Micah Powell	Rice N' Peas	3:31
7.	"Lights Out" (sung by Suho, Baekhyun, Chen and D.O.)	Chen	Bane Scott; Ryuichi Flores (Kepler); Andrew "Fiction." Holyfield (Kepler); Jason "Arner" Housman (Kepler)	Kepler	3:06
8.	"Universe" (CD version)	Sarah Yoon	Hyuk Shin (Joombas); Marco "MRey" Reyes (Joombas); JJ Evans (Joombas); Jeff Lewis	Joombas	4:24
Total length:					30:45

== Charts ==
=== Weekly charts ===
Chart (2017–18)	Peak position
French Download Albums (SNEP)	73
Japanese Albums (Oricon)	8
Japanese Hot Albums (Billboard Japan)	20
New Zealand Heatseeker Albums (RMNZ)	8
South Korean Albums (Gaon)	1
US Independent Albums (Billboard)	26
US World Albums (Billboard)	2

=== Monthly charts ===
Chart (2017)	Peak position
South Korean Albums (Gaon)	1

=== Year-end charts ===
Chart (2017)	Position
South Korean Albums (Gaon)	6

== Sales ==
Region	Sales
China	212,511
Japan	20,917
South Korea	556,435

== Awards and nominations ==
Year	Award	Nominated work	Category	Result
2017	Gaon Chart Music Awards	Universe	Album of the Year – 4th Quarter	Nominated
2018	Melon Music Awards	Universe	Album of the Year (Daesang)	Nominated

=== Music program awards ===
Song	Program	Date
"Universe"	M Countdown (Mnet)	January 4, 2018
"Universe"	Music Bank (KBS)	January 5, 2018
"Universe"	Music Bank (KBS)	January 12, 2018
"Universe"	Show! Music Core (MBC)	January 6, 2018

== Release history ==
Region	Date	Format	Label	Ref.
South Korea	December 26, 2017	CD	SM; Genie	
Various	December 26, 2017	Digital download; streaming	SM	
