= Shall We? =

Song recorded by South Korean singer Chen

Single by Chen

from the EP Dear My Dear
- Language: Korean
- Released: October 1, 2019
- Studio: SM Blue Cup Studio; SM LVYIN Studio; Prelude Studio; Seoul Studio
- Genre: K-pop; Retro
- Length: 3:44
- Label: SM; Dreamus
- Songwriter: Kenzie
- Producer: Kenzie

Chen singles chronology
"Beautiful Goodbye" (2019)	"Shall We?" (2019)	"Hello" (2020)

Music video
- "Shall We?" on YouTube

"Shall We?" (Korean: 우리 어떻게 할까요?; RR: Uri eotteoke halkkayo?; lit. 'What Shall We Do?') is a song recorded by South Korean singer and songwriter Chen. It was released as the title track of Chen's second extended play Dear My Dear on October 1, 2019.

== Background and release ==
"Shall We?", which was written and produced by Kenzie, is described as a retro pop song that combines a sophisticated mood and romantic melody created by standard classic pop arrangements and lyrics about love.

== Music video ==
On September 27, the first teaser of the "Shall We?" music video was released. On September 29, the second teaser was released. On October 1, at midnight, "Shall We?" music video was officially released.

On October 1–3, "Shall We?" music video behind photos were released. On October 8, a close up cam video of "Shall We?" music video was released.

== Credits and personnel ==
Credits adapted from EP's liner notes.

Studio

- SM Blue Cup Studio – recording, mixing
- SM LVYIN Studio – recording, digital editing
- Prelude Studio – recording
- Seoul Studio – recording
- SM SSAM Studio – engineered for mix
- The Mastering Palace – mastering

Personnel

- SM Entertainment – executive producer
- Lee Soo-man – producer
- Yoo Young-jin – music and sound supervisor
- Chen – vocals, background vocals
- Kenzie – producer, songwriter, vocal directing, background vocals
- Choi Hoon – bass
- Hong Jun-ho – guitar
- Song Young-joo – keyboards
- Yung – strings
- Nile Lee – strings arrangement, strings conducting
- Jung Eui-seok – recording, mixing
- Lee Ji-hong – recording, digital editing
- Lee Chang-sun – recording
- Jeong Ki-hong – recording
- Choi Da-in – recording assistant
- Noh Min-ji – engineered for mix
- Dave Kutch – mastering

== Charts ==
=== Weekly charts ===
Chart (2019)	Peak position
South Korea (Circle)	12
South Korea (Kpop Hot 100)	14

=== Year-end charts ===
Chart (2019)	Position
South Korea (Circle)	193
