= Hanyang Cyber University =

South Korean private virtual university

- 한양사이버대학교
- Type: Private virtual university
- Established: March 4, 2002; 24 years ago
- President: Lee Gi-jeong
- Location: 220 Wangsimni-ro, Seongdong-gu, Seoul, South Korea

Hanyang Cyber University (Korean: 한양사이버대학교) is a private virtual university in South Korea, founded in 2002. It has 41 departments, 6 graduate schools, and approximately 19,184 students.
