= Amila Eranga =

Sri Lankan cricketer (born 1986)

Amila Eranga (full name Amila Eranga Witharana; born 23 September 1986) is a Sri Lankan cricketer. He is a right-handed batsman and leg-break bowler who plays for Sebastianites. He was born in Matara.

Eranga played for Kalutara Town Club's Under-23s team during the 2007 season, and in the 2008 season moved to the Sebastianites' team.

Eranga made his first-class debut in the 2008–09 season, against Lankan Cricket Club. From the opening order, he scored 2 runs in the first innings in which he batted, and 15 runs in the second. He is now living in Australia, Melbourne
