= NIve =

South Korean singer-songwriter (born 1993)

- Born: Jisoo Park; June 9, 1993 (age 33); Seoul, South Korea
- Genre: R&B
- Occupations: Singer-songwriter; producer; composer
- Instruments: Vocals; clarinet
- Years active: 2014–present
- Labels: 153/Joombas (2014–2023); Chapter M (2023–present)

Korean name
- Hangul: 박지수
- RR: Bak Jisu
- MR: Pak Chisu

Jisoo Park (Korean: 박지수; born June 9, 1993), better known by his stage name NIve (니브), is a South Korean singer-songwriter, producer, and composer. He made his first public appearance as a contestant in the South Korean talent show Superstar K 6, where he finished in the Top 9 (at the time appearing as Brian Park). NIve released his first single, "Getaway," with singer-songwriter JMSN on November 9, 2018. NIve has also written, composed, and produced songs for major K-pop artists, including BTS, NCT, Chen, Paul Kim and Sam Kim.

== Early life ==
NIve was born Jisoo Park on June 9, 1993, in Seoul, South Korea. NIve listened to classical music as a child and he learned to play the clarinet in the fifth grade, which earned him prizes in competitions. During his first year in middle school, his family immigrated to the Gold Coast in Queensland, Australia. Feeling lonely in a new country, he joined the school choir upon his teacher's suggestion where he began to sing. NIve attended high school in New Jersey and enrolled in Mannes School of Music as the only clarinet major in 2012. Upon completing his first year, NIve took a leave of absence to pursue contemporary music and began busking and uploading videos on the platform YouTube.

== Career ==
Using the name Brian Park, he was a contestant on the sixth season of the talent show series Superstar K in 2014. Due to his well-received solo and group vocal performances by the judge panel, the Top 10 was extended to a Top 11 and he advanced through the competition. According to the ratings agency TNmS, in the program's first live episode, Park's rendition of "Even If I Close My Eyes" (눈 감아봐도) by Park Jun-hee received the highest per-minute viewership in households with cable subscriptions among all competitors at 6.6%. Park progressed into the Top 9 and sang John Legend's "All of Me", leading the judges to criticize his song choice. He was ranked in the bottom three that episode along with Burstered and Lee Jun-hee. After calculations of the judges' scores and text votes were completed, Park received the lowest score and was eliminated from the competition.

He released his international debut single "Getaway" with American singer-songwriter JSMN in November 2018. He later signed with 153 Entertainment Group as a songwriter and wrote Chen's 2019 hit single "Beautiful Goodbye". In 2019, he released the singles "Who I Am", "Liberated" and "Tired". The following year, NIve released his single "Like a Fool" in collaboration with Sam Kim, for whom he had already written the song "Where's My Money", and wrote Paul Kim's "The Reason for My Spring". Following the song's release, he was contacted by V of BTS, with whom he wrote Blue & Grey for the band's fifth studio album Be. That same year, he released his first single album, titled Bandages, which included the songs "How Do I" and "New Light", and the single "2easy" in collaboration with Heize. He then wrote the song "My Everything" for NCT's second studio album, NCT 2020 Resonance, and participated in the online version of the JTBC television show Begin Again.

In June 2021, NIve released the song "Escape", which served as a pre-release single for his first extended play Broken Kaleidoscope, subsequently released in September. He released a documentary on his YouTube channel on August 13, 2023, describing his life after immigrating to Australia and how he started pursuing a career in the pop music scene as a classical clarinet player. Later that year, NIve released the digital single "Party Without U". On February 28, 2022, NIve released the single album Prolog?, which served as the first part of the LOG (Lessons on Growing) series.

NIve recorded the song "Alarm" for the soundtrack of the JTBC television series Agency (2023); "Alarm" was released on March 17, 2023. That year, NIve founded a record label, Chapter M, and released two singles, "Record Player" in November and "Till U Say I Go" in December. He released another single, "Eternity" (영원), on March 4, 2024, as part of the Chapter M Project.

== Discography ==
=== Extended plays ===
Title	Album details	Peak positions
Title	Album details	KOR
Broken Kaleidoscope	Released: July 27, 2021; Label: 153/Joombas; Formats: CD, digital download; Track listing: 1. "Escape"; 2. "Maybe I Wanna Die"; 3. "I'm Alive"; 4. "Perfect Dancer"; 5. "To: My Dear Friend"	76

=== Single albums ===
Title	Details
Bandages	Released: August 12, 2020; Label: 153/Joombas; Format: Digital download; Track listing: 1. "How Do I"; 2. "New Light"
Prolog?	Released: February 28, 2022; Label: 153/Joombas; Format: Digital download; Track listing: 1. "What Is Life?"; 2. "Omg So What?"

=== Singles ===
Title	Year	Album
"Getaway" (featuring JMSN)	2018	Non-album single
"Who I Am"	2019	Non-album single
"Liberated"	2019	Non-album single
"Tired"	2019	Non-album single
"Like a Fool" (with Sam Kim)	2020	Non-album single
"How Do I"	2020	Bandages
"New Light"	2020	Bandages
"2easy" (featuring Heize)	2020	Non-album single
"Escape"	2021	Broken Kaleidoscope
"Pop Song" (with Hanhae)	2021	Non-album single
"Party Without U"	2021	Non-album single
"In My Head"	2022	Non-album single
"Record Player"	2023	Non-album single
"Till U Say I Go"	2023	Non-album single
"Celebration"	2024	Non-album single
"Break Up, Not Make Up"	2024	Non-album single
"Eternity" (영원)	2024	Non-album single

=== Soundtrack appearances ===
Title	Year	Album
"New Start"	2020	It's Time to Start
"Where's My Love"	2021	The Stairway of Time
"A Gloomy Clock" (우울시계) (with Jamie)	2021	Begin Again: Open Mic Episode 1
"Every Day, Every Moment"	2021	Begin Again: Open Mic Episode 2
"Perfect"	2021	Begin Again: Open Mic Episode 4
"Wake Me Up"	2021	Begin Again: Open Mic Episode 5
"Alarm"	2023	Agency

== Filmography ==
=== Television ===
Year	Title	Role	Ref.
2014	Superstar K6	Contestant	
2021	Begin Again	Himself	
