= Beautiful Goodbye (Chen song) =

2019 single by Chen

Single by Chen

from the EP April, and a Flower
- Language: Korean
- Released: April 1, 2019
- Studio: SM LVYIN Studio; Seoul Studio
- Genre: K-pop
- Length: 4:29
- Label: SM; Dreamus
- Composers: MooF; Jisoo Park
- Lyricist: Jisoo Park

Chen singles chronology
"Bye Babe" (2017)	"Beautiful Goodbye" (2019)	"Shall We?" (2019)

Music video
- "Beautiful Goodbye" on YouTube

"Beautiful Goodbye" (Korean: 사월이 지나면 우리 헤어져요; RR: Sawori jinamyeon uri heeojeoyo; lit. 'Let's Break Up When April Ends') is a song recorded by South Korean singer and songwriter Chen. It was released as a single to promote Chen's debut extended play April, and a Flower on April 1, 2019.

The song was a commercial success, peaking at number four on South Korea's Gaon Digital Chart.

== Background and release ==
"Beautiful Goodbye", composed by MooF and Jisoo Park, is described as a piano-backed ballad, with lyrics about a man preparing to say goodbye to his failing relationship.

== Music video ==
On April 1, 2019, the official music video of "Beautiful Goodbye" was released. The video shows Chen performing in a middle of a dry, barren land and is accompanied by a veiled female pianist. Later on, the two are joined by veiled female dancers.

== Promotion ==
Chen started promoting "Beautiful Goodbye" on Korean music programs for one week starting from April 5, 2019.

== Accolades ==
Music show awards
Program	Date	Ref.
Show! Music Core (MBC)	April 13, 2019	
Inkigayo (SBS)	April 14, 2019	

== Credits and personnel ==
Credits adapted from EP's liner notes.

=== Studio ===
- SM LVYIN Studio – recording, digital editing
- Seoul Studio – recording
- SM SSAM Studio – engineered for mix
- SM Yellow Tail Studio – mixing
- 821 Sound – mastering

=== Personnel ===
- SM Entertainment – executive producer
- Lee Soo-man – producer
- Yoo Young-jin – music and sound supervisor
- Chen – vocals
- Jisoo Park – lyrics, composition
- MooF – composition, arrangement
- Lee Ju-hyung – vocal directing
- Gil Eun-kyung – piano
- Lee Ji-hong – recording, digital editing
- Jeong Ki-hong – recording
- Choi Da-in – recording assistant
- Lee Chan-mi – recording assistant
- Noh Min-ji – engineered for mix
- Gu Jong-pil – mixing
- Kwon Nam-woo – mastering

== Charts ==
=== Weekly charts ===
Chart (2019)	Peak position
South Korea (Circle)	4
South Korea (K-pop Hot 100)	2

=== Year-end charts ===
Chart (2019)	Position
South Korea (Circle)	41
