= Jess Morgan =

Jess Morgan is a singer-songwriter born in Norwich, England. She attended university in York and she regularly tours in the UK, Europe and the US.

Having first produced a number of home-recorded EPs and demos, Morgan was championed by BBC Radio DJs Steve Lamacq and Tom Robinson, which instigated the recording and independent release of her first album All Swell in 2010. The record was co-produced with Norwegian producer-engineers Hans Petter (HP) Gundersen and Daniel Birkeland. Through her own indie label, Amateur Boxer Records, Morgan released a number of subsequent albums and EPs.

She released her second album Aye Me in 2012. It was co-produced with Tom Hartley-Booth and funded via a Pledge Music campaign. In the same year, she toured alongside the Welsh band Paper Aeroplanes. Morgan launched her 2014 album Langa Langa, co-produced with Stephen MacLachlan, with a sold-out April launch show at Norwich Arts Centre and an extensive tour of the UK and Europe. Tracks from Langa Langa have been played by a number of British DJs who specialise in the genres of folk, roots and Americana including the BBC Folk Show hosted by Mark Radcliffe. The Guardian has called Morgan's music "gorgeous country folk".

The Bournemouth EP (2015) was conceived as a limited run record, packaged in a unique folding paper case with postcard inserts, with each edition signed and numbered. The first run sold out in a few hours. A second 'touring' edition was later released in the UK and Germany.

Morgan also makes her own 7" vinyl records at home, including the single Natalie, released in spring 2016. The song and the unusual format attracted attention from the BBC Folk Show and BBC 6 Music, as well as paving the way for her 2016 album Edison Gloriette, which was released by the Norwegian record label Drabant Music. A song from this album, Still In Fashion, came out on home-made 7" vinyl in time for Record Store Day the same year.

Morgan is also a featured vocalist and co-writer of a number of dance music and trance songs featuring on albums from Armin Van Buuren and Beat Service, plus records which have featured in Beatport top 10 and the UK albums chart.

== Discography ==
=== Albums ===
- All Swell (2010)
- Aye Me (2012)
- Langa Langa (2014)
- Edison Gloriette (2016)

=== EPs ===
- Crosses/Pamela (2009)
- Roaming Records Session Vol. 2 (2011)
- Richer, Thinner, Smarter (2013)
- The Bournemouth EP (2015)

=== Singles ===
- "Natalie" (2016)
