= Chen (singer) =

South Korean singer and songwriter (born 1992)

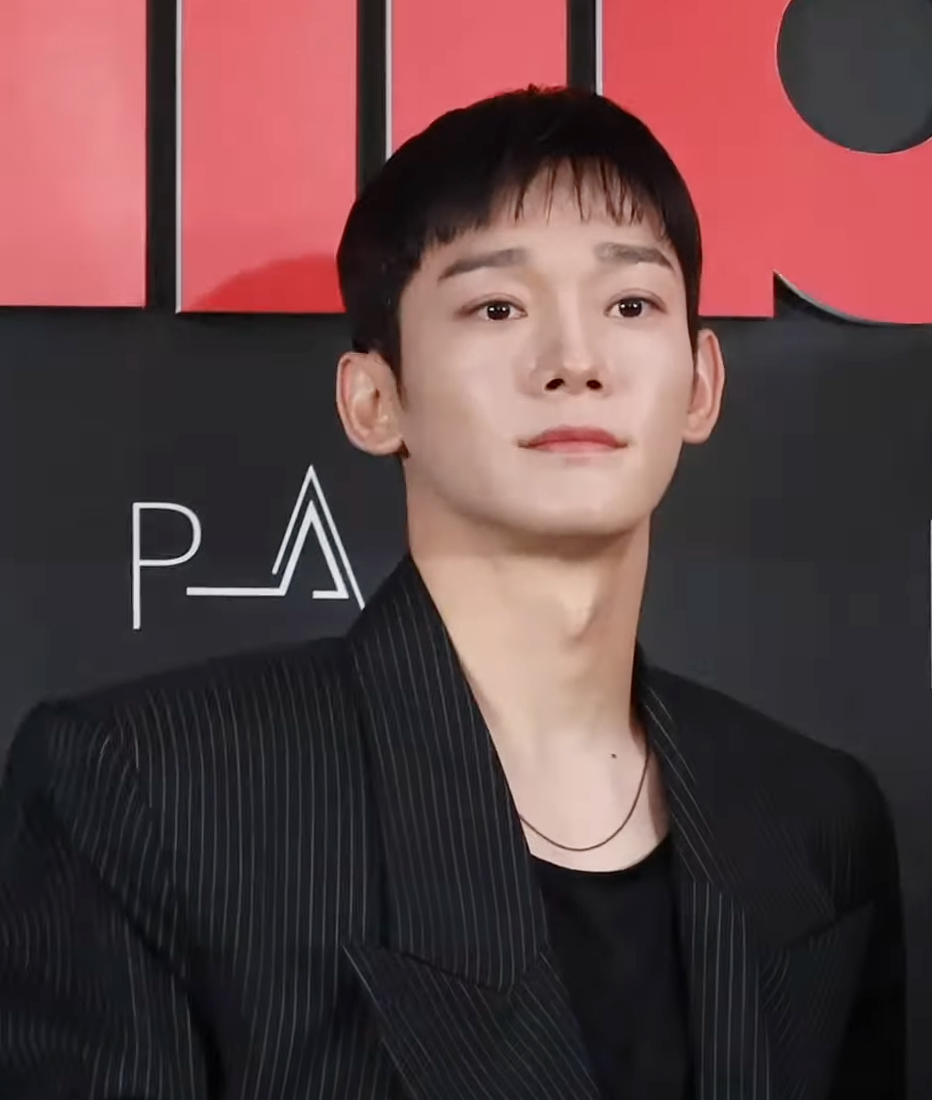
- Chen in 2024
- Born: Kim Jong-dae; September 21, 1992 (age 34); Daejeon, South Korea
- Education: Kyung Hee Cyber University; Hanyang University
- Occupations: Singer; songwriter
- Spouse: Unknown (m. 2020)
- Children: 2
- Musical career
- Genres: K-pop; ballad; R&B
- Instrument: Vocals
- Years active: 2011–present
- Labels: SM; INB100
- Member of: Exo; Exo-M; Exo-CBX; SM the Ballad; SM Town
- Website: inb100.com/42

Korean name
- Hangul: 김종대
- RR: Gim Jongdae
- MR: Kim Chongdae

Signature
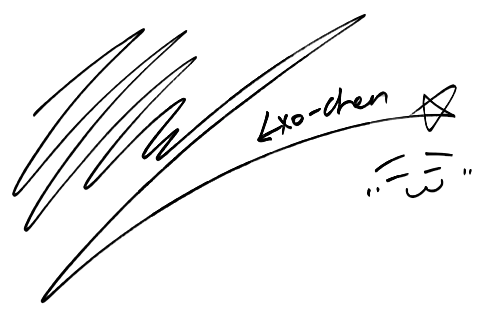

Kim Jong-dae (Korean: 김종대; born September 21, 1992), known professionally as Chen (첸), is a South Korean singer and songwriter. He is a member of the South Korean boy band Exo, its subgroup Exo-M and its subunit Exo-CBX, and participated in SM's projects SM the Ballad. He is predominantly known for his role as the vocalist of Exo. Apart from his group's activities, Chen has also recorded songs for various television dramas, most notably "Best Luck" for It's Okay, That's Love (2014) and "Everytime" for Descendants of the Sun (2016).

In 2019, Chen debuted as a solo singer with the extended play (EP) April, and a Flower, which peaked at number two on South Korea's Gaon Album Chart and spawned the hit single "Beautiful Goodbye". Continuing the success, his second EP, Dear My Dear, accompanied by the single "Shall We?" was released later that same year.

== Life and career ==
=== 1992–2014: Early life and career beginnings ===
Chen was born on September 21, 1992, in Daejeon and grew up in the Jeongwang-dong neighborhood of Siheung. He became a trainee at SM Entertainment through the company's Casting System in 2011 at the age of 19. On December 29, 2011, he was formally introduced as the fourth member of Exo. He made his first public appearance as an Exo member alongside Luhan, Tao, and Kai at the 2011 SBS Gayo Daejeon.

In 2014, Chen joined the ballad group SM the Ballad, initially formed by SM Entertainment in 2010. On the group's second album Breath, he sang the Chinese version of the lead single "Breath" with Zhang Liyin. He also sang a duet with f(x)'s Krystal titled "When I Was... When U Were...", and "A Day Without You" with Shinee's Jonghyun. Chen performed his duets with Krystal and Jonghyun live at the SM the Ballad Joint Recital on February 12.

In July 2014, Chen released his first solo song since debut titled "The Best Luck" as an original soundtrack for the SBS drama It's Okay, That's Love, which stars his fellow Exo member D.O. "The Best Luck" was awarded the "Best OST by a Male Artist" and "Best OST Song" at the 5th So-Loved Awards and the 16th Seoul International Youth Film Festival respectively. Chen was also invited as a special performer at the 3rd APAN Star Awards on November 11, 2014, where he performed the track live.

=== 2015–2018: Solo activities and Exo-CBX ===
In June 2015, Chen co-wrote the lyrics for "Promise," a song from the reissued edition of Exo's second studio album Exodus, along with fellow members Chanyeol and Lay. In August 2015, he made his musical theatre debut playing the role of Benny in the SM C&C production In the Heights. He also participated in and became the runner-up in the eleventh round of the music television show King of Mask Singer under the alias "Legendary Guitar Man".

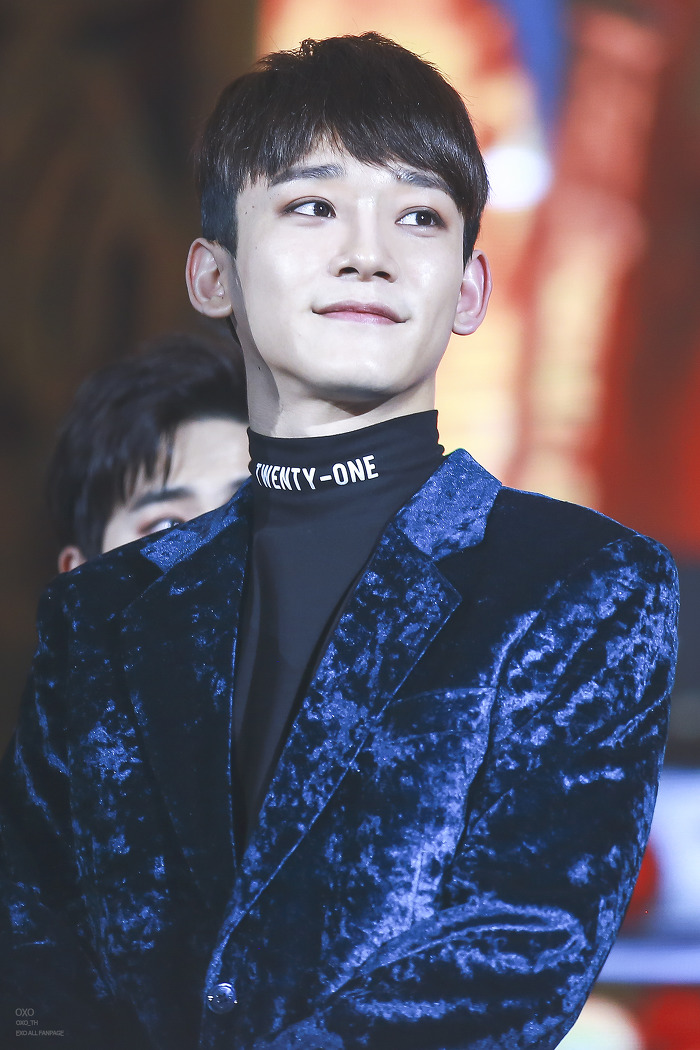
Chen at the 8th Melon Music Awards in November 2016

In January 2016, Chen performed John Lennon's song "Imagine" with pianist Steve Barakatt at the Sejong Center for the Performing Arts, as part of UNICEF's "Imagine Project." In February, Chen and South Korean singer Punch released a duet titled "Everytime" as a soundtrack for the KBS drama Descendants of the Sun. The song debuted at number one on Gaon's weekly digital chart. In April, Chen and South Korean rapper Heize released "Lil' Something", a song produced by Vibe member Ryu Jae-hyun, as the ninth weekly single of SM Entertainment's Station music project.

In August 2016, Chen collaborated with fellow Exo members Xiumin and Baekhyun on an original soundtrack titled "For You" for the SBS drama Moon Lovers: Scarlet Heart Ryeo. In October, he collaborated with DJ Alesso on another song for the Station project titled "Years". Later in October, together with Baekhyun and Xiumin, Chen became a member of Exo's first sub unit Exo-CBX. The group made their debut with the extended play Hey Mama!.

In January 2017, Chen collaborated with Dynamic Duo in a song titled "Nosedive", becoming the first artist to be featured in the group's collaboration project "Mixxxture". The song reached number two on the Gaon Digital Chart. In February, he released an original soundtrack titled "I'm Not Okay" for the MBC drama Missing 9 in which his fellow Exo member Chanyeol played a supporting role.

In March, Chen was accepted into the advertisement media MBA program at Hanyang Cyber University.

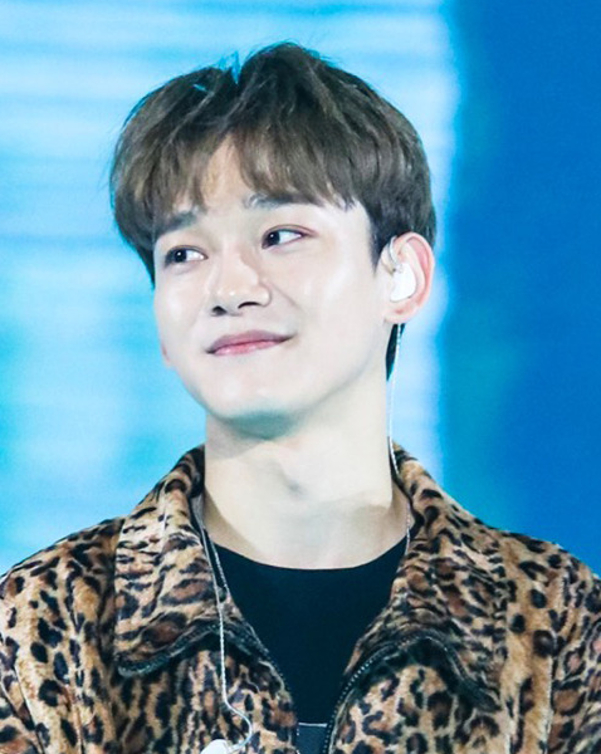
Chen at the Nature Republic Fan Festival in March 2018

In July, he was revealed to have co-written the lyrics for the tracks "Touch It" and "Ko Ko Bop" from Exo's fourth studio album, The War. In November, Chen collaborated with South Korean singer 10cm on a song titled "Bye Babe" for the second season of SM Entertainment's station project. In December, Chen wrote the lyrics for "Lights Out" from Exo's EP Universe, which he performed alongside fellow members Suho, Baekhyun, and D.O..

On October 16, 2018, Chen released an original soundtrack titled "Cherry Blossom Love Song" for the drama 100 Days My Prince, in which fellow Exo member D.O. played the lead role. He and Chanyeol also participated in writing lyrics for "Love Shot", the title track from the reissued edition of Exo's fifth studio album, Don't Mess Up My Tempo.

=== 2019–2022: Solo debut and military service ===
On February 7, 2019, Chen released an original soundtrack titled "Make It Count" for the drama Touch Your Heart. On March 8, SM Entertainment confirmed that Chen was preparing for his first solo album, which was set to be released in April. On April 1, Chen officially released his solo debut EP, April, and a Flower, with the lead single "Beautiful Goodbye". He also participated in writing the lyrics for one of the songs, "Flower". His solo EP April, and a Flower place number 1 on iTunes album in 32 regions around the world.

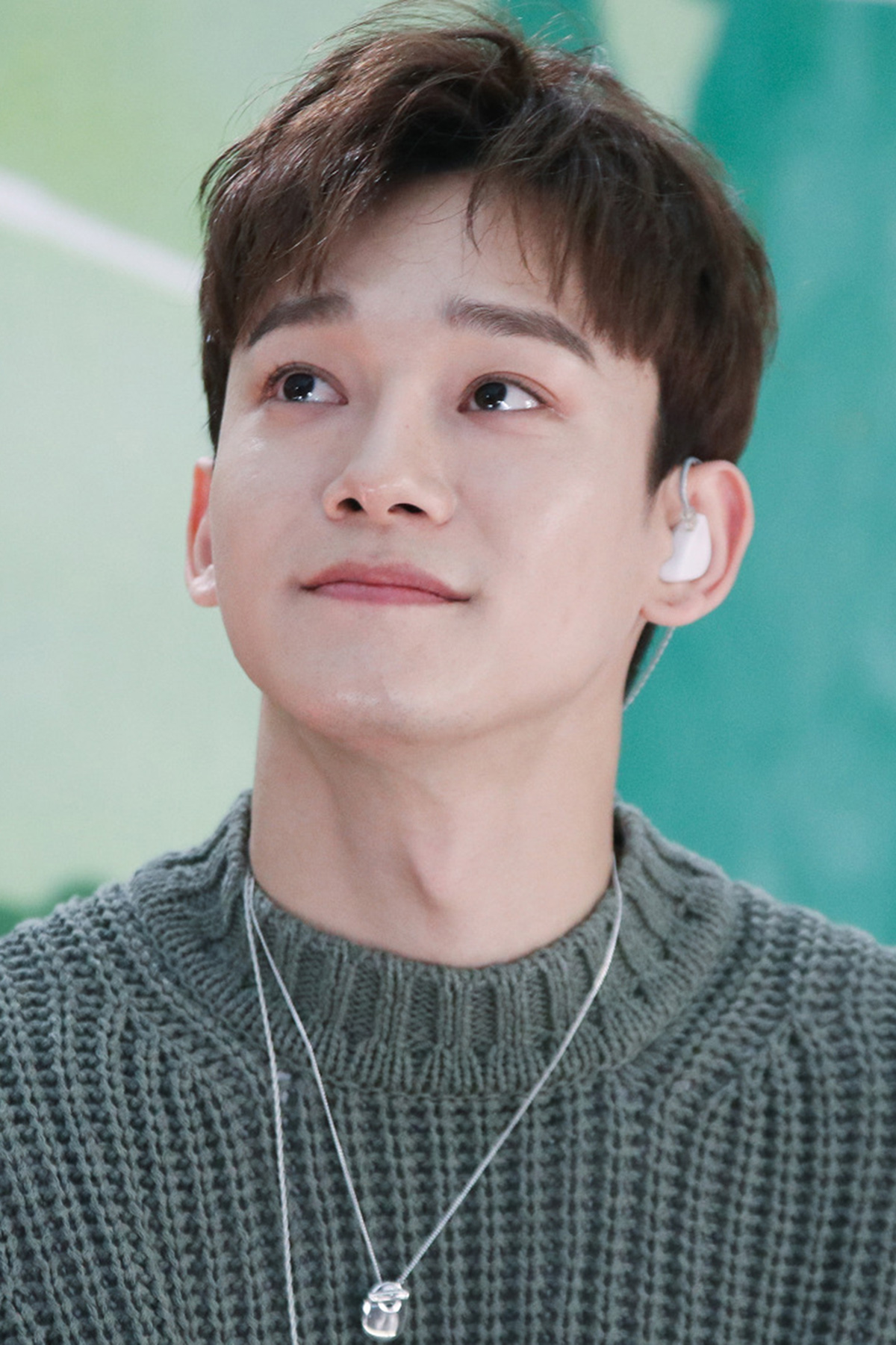
Chen in April 2019

In May, Chen collaborated with South Korean singer Onestar for a single titled "May We Bye". In July, he was featured on Ailee's song "Love" from her album Butterfly. On October 1, Chen released his second mini-album, Dear My Dear with six songs including the title track "Shall We?". He participated in writing the lyrics for "My Dear", one of the songs on the album. Dear My Dear debuted at number 1 on the physical album chart and iTunes top album charts in a total of 36 countries.

On January 23, 2020, Chen and Dynamic Duo released another collaboration song titled "You". In September, he released an original soundtrack titled "Your Moonlight" for the drama Do You Like Brahms?. On October 16, Chen released a digital single titled "Hello", before announcing that he was set to enlist for his mandatory military service.

He enlisted as an active duty soldier on October 26, 2020. He was discharged on April 25, 2022. In June, he released the song "An Unfamiliar Day" as part of the soundtrack for the MBC TV series Doctor Lawyer. On October 11, SM announced his third EP, Last Scene. Initially set to be released on October 31, SM announced that the album release would be postponed to November 14 to respect the mourning period established after the crowd crush in Itaewon. The album debuted at number 1 on Circle Album Chart with 85,171 sales. Later in November, Chen released his second OST track of the year, "Heaven For You" for the SBS TV series The First Responders.

In May 2023, Chen and singer Yang Hee-eun released the SM Station single "My Flower, Your Light (Bloom)".

=== 2023–present: Label changes, Door and Arcadia ===
On June 1, 2023, it was announced that Chen, Baekhyun and Xiumin had ended their contracts with SM Entertainment on the grounds of overdue payment and unreasonable deals. On June 19, SM and the three members announced that both parties had resolved their differences over contract dispute and the members had decided to stay with the agency.

On January 8, 2024, Chen joined Baekhyun's label, INB100, to manage his solo activities while Exo activities remain under SM Entertainment. Chen released his fourth Korean-language EP, Door, on May 28, 2024, including its lead single "Empty". Chen concluded his first fan-con "Beyond the Door" in Seoul on September 21 and 22, which then continued in several Asian countries. On October 1, Chen released the digital single "Beyond:", which consists of "Love You" and "Brighter Than".

In 2025, he was chosen to perform at the opening of Korea 360, which was held at the Grand Hyatt Dubai. On April 28, Chen released the pop-rock digital single "Broken Party". On July 22, "Broken Party" was listed at 17th place by Billboard on its "The 25 Best K-Pop Songs of 2025" list. On September 8, Chen released the trailer video to announce his fifth EP Arcadia, which was released on September 29. On September 12, it was also announced that his first solo concert with the same name as his EP will be held in Seoul on October 11 and 12.

== Personal life ==
On January 13, 2020, Chen announced his upcoming marriage with his girlfriend, in a private ceremony attended by both of their families. It was also announced that Chen's fiancée was pregnant. Their first child, a daughter, was born on April 29. On January 19, 2022, his wife gave birth to their second child, a daughter. On August 16, 2023, SM Entertainment said that Chen's wedding, which he was unable to hold due to the COVID-19 pandemic, would take place in October.

== Discography ==
Extended plays

- April, and a Flower (2019)
- Dear My Dear (2019)
- Last Scene (2022)
- Polaris (2023)
- Door (2024)
- Arcadia (2025)

== Filmography ==
=== Dramas ===
Title	Year	Role	Notes
Exo Next Door	2015	Chen	Web drama; minor role

=== Variety shows ===
Title	Year	Role	Notes
King of Mask Singer	2015	Contestant	Episodes 21 and 22; Stage Name : Legendary Guitarman
Travel without Manager	2016	Main cast	Episodes 1-8
Be The Next: 9 Dreamers	2025	Judge/Mentor	

== Theater ==
Title	Year	Role	Notes
In the Heights	2015	Benny	Main Role

== Awards and nominations ==
Year presented, name of the award ceremony, award category, nominated work and the result of the nomination
Year	Award	Category	Nominated work	Result
2014	16th Seoul International Youth Film Festival	Best OST by a Male Artist	"Best Luck"	Won
2017	19th Mnet Asian Music Awards	Best Collaboration with Dynamic Duo	"Nosedive"	Won
2017	19th Mnet Asian Music Awards	Qoo10 Song of The Year	"Nosedive"	Nominated
2017	9th Melon Music Awards	Best Rap/Hip Hop Award with Dynamic Duo	"Nosedive"	Won
2018	7th Gaon Chart Music Awards	Song of the Year – January	"Nosedive"	Nominated
2019	2nd Genie Music Awards	Male Solo Artist	Chen	Nominated
2019	2nd Genie Music Awards	Vocal Artist	Chen	Nominated
2019	Annual Fresh Asia Music Awards	TOP 10 Asia-Pacific Gold Song of the Year	"Make It Count"	Won
2019	11th Melon Music Awards	Top 10 Artists	Chen	Nominated
2019	11th Melon Music Awards	Album of the Year	April, and a Flower	Nominated
2019	21st Mnet Asian Music Awards	Best Vocal Performance – Solo	"Beautiful Goodbye"	Nominated
2019	21st Mnet Asian Music Awards	Song of the Year	"Beautiful Goodbye"	Nominated
2019	34th Golden Disc Awards	Digital Bonsang	"Beautiful Goodbye"	Nominated
2019	34th Golden Disc Awards	Disc Bonsang	April, and a Flower	Nominated
2019	29th Seoul Music Awards	Popularity Award	Chen	Nominated
2019	29th Seoul Music Awards	Hallyu Special Award	Chen	Nominated
2019	29th Seoul Music Awards	Bonsang Award	Chen	Nominated
2019	29th Seoul Music Awards	Daesang Award	Chen	Nominated
2019	2020 Korea First Brand Awards	Male Vocalist	Chen	Won
2022	2022 Asian Pop Music Awards (Note: Hosted by the Hong Kong Asia Pacific International Group and Sunway Records, the Asian Pop Music Awards bases its winners on "Asian Pop Music Chart" which opened in September 2019.)	Top 20 Songs of the Year (Overseas)	"Last Scene"	Won
2022	2022 Asian Pop Music Awards	People's Choice Award (Overseas)	Last Scene	4th place
