= Mark Lee (singer) discography =

Mark discography
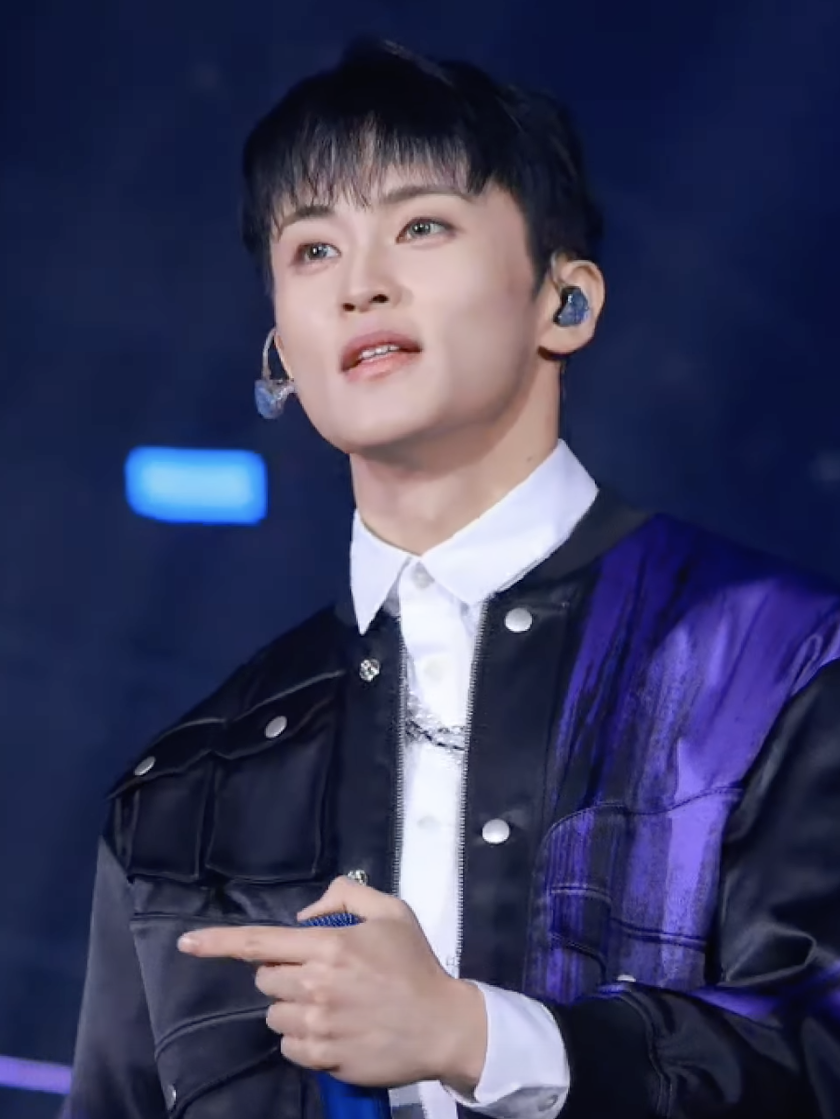
- Mark in 2024
- Studio albums: 1
- Singles: 7
- Collaborations: 6
- Soundtrack appearances: 3

The discography of Canadian rapper Mark consists of one studio album, seven singles, and various collaboration singles. His debut studio album, The Firstfruit, was released in April 2025. It peaked at number one on the Circle Album Chart and number eight on the Oricon Albums Chart, and sold over 500,000 copies in South Korea.

== Studio albums ==
List of studio albums, showing selected details, chart positions, and sales figures
Title	Details	Peak chart positions			Sales	Certifications
Title	Details	KOR	JPN	JPN Hot	Sales	Certifications
The Firstfruit	Released: April 7, 2025; Label: SM, Kakao; Formats: CD, digital download, streaming	1	8	43	KOR: 580,923; JPN: 22,885	KMCA: 2× Platinum
Windmill	Scheduled: December 4, 2026; Label: Upper Room; Formats: CD, digital download, streaming	To be released				

== Singles ==
=== As lead artist ===
Title	Year	Peak chart positions									Sales	Album
Title	Year	KOR	KOR Songs (Note: Includes the Billboard K-pop Hot 100 (defunct as of 2022), and South Korea Songs (part of Billboard's Hits of the World (2022 onwards).)	IDN Songs	MLY	SGP Reg.	THL Songs	UK Dig.	US World	WW Excl. US	Sales	Album
"Drop" (두고가) (featuring Seulgi)	2017	93	—	—	—	—	—	—	—	—	KOR: 46,443	School Rapper FINAL
"Child"	2022	23	48	9	17	16	25	—	8	132	—N/a	SM Station: NCT Lab
"Golden Hour"	2023	112	—	—	—	—	—	—	13	—	—N/a	SM Station: NCT Lab
"200"	2024	61	—	—	—	—	—	—	—	—	—N/a	The Firstfruit
"Fraktsiya" (with Lee Young-ji)	2024	54	—	—	—	—	—	—	—	—	—N/a	The Firstfruit
"+82 Pressin'" (featuring Haechan)	2025	144	—	—	—	—	—	—	—	—	—N/a	The Firstfruit
"1999"	2025	12	—	—	—	—	—	42	—	—	—N/a	The Firstfruit
"My Friend"	2026	—	—	—	—	—	22	—	—	—	—N/a	Non-album single
"—" denotes a recording that did not chart or was not released in that territory.

=== As featured artist ===
Title	Year	Peak chart positions	Album
Title	Year	KOR	Album
"How We Do" (Xiumin featuring Mark)	2022	— (Note: "How We Do" did not enter the Gaon Digital Chart, but peaked at number 47 on the Gaon Download Chart.)	Brand New
"HO" (Yesung featuring Mark)	2023	—	Sensory Flows
"Time Machine" (Doyoung featuring Mark and Taeyeon)	2024	119	Youth
"Sunkissed" (Big Naughty featuring Mark of NCT)	2024	124	Non-album single

== Collaborations ==
Title	Year	Peak chart positions		Sales	Album
Title	Year	KOR	US World	Sales	Album
"Young & Free" (with Xiumin)	2017	31	—	KOR: 72,133	SM Station Season 2
"Lemonade Love" (with Parc Jae-jung)	2017	197	17	—N/a	SM Station Season 2
"—" denotes a recording that did not chart or was not released in that territory.

== Soundtrack appearances ==
List of soundtrack singles, showing year released, selected chart positions, and name of the album
Title	Year	Peak chart positions	Album
Title	Year	KOR	Album
"What to Do" (니 맘에 들어갈래) (Henry featuring Mark)	2016	— (Note: "What to Do" did not enter the Gaon Digital Chart, but peaked at number 68 on the Gaon BGM Chart.)	Sweet Stranger and Me OST
"Dream Me" (나라는 꿈) (with Joy)	2018	— (Note: "Dream Me" did not enter the Gaon Digital Chart, but peaked at number 6 on the Gaon BGM Chart.)	The Ghost Detective OST
"Lit (prod. Czaer)" (with Taeyong)	2022	—	Street Man Fighter Original Vol. 4 (Crew Songs)
"—" denotes a recording that did not chart or was not released in that territory.

== Other charted songs ==
List of other charted songs, showing year released, selected chart positions, and name of the album
Title	Year	Peak chart positions	Album
Title	Year	KOR Down.	Album
"Raincouver"	2025	47	The Firstfruit
"Watching TV (with Crush)"	2025	51	The Firstfruit
"Loser"	2025	54	The Firstfruit
"Righteous"	2025	59	The Firstfruit
"Too Much"	2025	60	The Firstfruit
"Toronto's Window"	2025	62	The Firstfruit
"Journey Mercies"	2025	71	The Firstfruit
"Flight to NYC"	2025	74	The Firstfruit
"Mom's Interlude"	2025	79	The Firstfruit

== Songwriting credits ==
All credits are adapted from the Korea Music Copyright Association, unless cited otherwise.

Year	Song	Artist(s)	Album	Credits
2016	"The 7th Sense"	NCT U	NCT 2018 Empathy	Co-writer
2016	"Firetruck"	NCT 127	NCT 127	Co-writer
2016	"Mad City"	Taeyong, Jaehyun, Mark	NCT 127	Co-writer
2016	"Chewing Gum"	NCT Dream	The First	Co-writer
2016	"My First and Last"	NCT Dream	The First	Co-writer
2017	"Drop"	Mark, Seulgi	School Rapper FINAL	Co-writer
2017	"Baby Don't Like It"	Taeil, Taeyong, Doyoung, Mark, Haechan	Limitless	Co-writer, co-producer
2017	"Angel"	NCT 127	Limitless	Co-writer
2017	"Good Thing"	NCT 127	Limitless	Co-writer
2017	"Cherry Bomb"	NCT 127	Cherry Bomb	Co-writer
2017	"Running 2 U"	NCT 127	Cherry Bomb	Co-writer
2017	"0 Mile"	NCT 127	Cherry Bomb	Co-writer
2017	"Whiplash"	Jaehyun, Mark, Taeyong, Doyoung, Taeil	Cherry Bomb	Co-writer
2017	"Summer 127"	NCT 127	Cherry Bomb	Co-writer
2017	"Young & Free"	Xiumin, Mark	SM Station Season 2	Co-writer
2017	"Lemonade Love"	Parc Jae-jung, Mark	SM Station Season 2	Co-writer
2017	"La La Love"	NCT Dream	We Young	Co-writer
2017	"Walk You Home"	NCT Dream	We Young	Co-writer
2017	"Trigger The Fever"	NCT Dream	We Young	Co-writer
2017	"My Page"	NCT Dream	We Young	Co-writer
2017	"Joy"	NCT Dream	SM Station Season 2	Co-writer
2018	"Boss"	NCT U	NCT 2018 Empathy	Co-writer
2018	"Yestoday"	NCT U	NCT 2018 Empathy	Co-writer
2018	"Black on Black"	NCT 2018	NCT 2018 Empathy	Co-writer
2018	"Go"	NCT Dream	NCT 2018 Empathy	Co-writer
2018	"We Go Up" (Korean & Chinese ver.)	NCT Dream	We Go Up	Co-writer
2018	"Beautiful Time"	NCT Dream	We Go Up	Co-writer
2018	"Drippin"	NCT Dream	We Go Up	Co-writer
2018	"Dear Dream"	NCT Dream	We Go Up	Co-writer
2018	"City 127"	NCT 127	Regular-Irregular	Co-writer
2018	"Regular"(Korean & English ver.)	NCT 127	Regular-Irregular	Co-writer
2018	"My Van"	Taeyong, Yuta, Jaehyun, Jungwoo, Mark	Regular-Irregular	Co-writer
2018	"Come Back"	NCT 127	Regular-Irregular	Co-writer
2018	"Welcome to My Playground"	NCT 127	Regular-Irregular	Co-writer
2018	"What We Talkin' Bout"	NCT 127, Marteen	Up Next Session: NCT 127	Co-writer
2018	"Candle Light"	NCT Dream	SM Station Season 3	Co-writer
2019	"Regular"	WayV	The Vision	Co-writer
2019	"Come Back"	WayV	The Vision	Co-writer
2019	"Lips"	NCT 127	Awaken	Co-writer
2019	"Jet Lag"	NCT 127	We Are Superhuman	Co-writer
2020	"Pandora's Box"	NCT 127	Neo Zone	Co-writer
2020	"Mad Dog"	Taeil, Doyoung, Taeyong, Mark	Neo Zone	Co-writer
2020	"Love Song"	NCT 127	Neo Zone	Co-writer
2020	"QTAH"	Mark	Non-album release	Writer
2020	"100"	SuperM	Super One	Co-writer, co-producer
2020	"Together At Home"	SuperM	Super One	Co-writer, co-producer
2020	"The Himalayas"	Mark, Taeyong	Non-album release	Co-writer, co-producer
2020	"Bad Smell"	Mark	Non-album release	Writer, co-producer
2021	"Rainbow"	NCT Dream	Hot Sauce	Co-writer
2021	"Sticker"	NCT 127	Sticker	Co-writer
2021	"Love On The Floor"	NCT 127	Sticker	Co-writer
2021	"New Axis"	Mark, Taeyong, Yangyang	Universe	Co-writer
2021	"Universe (Let's Play Ball)"	NCT U	Universe	Co-writer
2021	"Know Now"	NCT U	Universe	Co-writer
2021	"Beautiful"	NCT 2021	Universe	Co-writer
2022	"Child"	Mark	SM Station: NCT Lab	Co-writer
2022	"Conextion (Age of Light)"	NCT U	SM Station: NCT Lab	Co-writer
2022	"Glitch Mode"	NCT Dream	Glitch Mode	Co-writer
2022	"It's Yours"	NCT Dream	Glitch Mode	Co-writer
2022	"Teddy Bear"	NCT Dream	Glitch Mode	Co-writer
2022	"Replay"	NCT Dream	Glitch Mode	Co-writer
2022	"Never Goodbye"	NCT Dream	Glitch Mode	Co-writer
2022	"Time Lapse"	NCT 127	2 Baddies	Co-writer
2022	"Designer"	NCT 127	2 Baddies	Co-writer
2022	"Lit (Prod. Czaer)"	Taeyong, Mark	Street Man Fighter Vol.4 (Crew Song)	Co-writer
2022	"How We Do"	Xiumin, Mark	Brand New	Co-writer
2022	"Take My Breath"	NCT Dream	Candy	Co-writer
2022	"The Cure"	Kangta, BoA, U-Know, Leeteuk, Taeyeon, Onew, Suho, Irene, Taeyong, Mark, Kun, Karina	2022 Winter SM Town: SMCU Palace	Co-writer
2023	"HO"	Yesung	Sensory Flows	Co-writer
2023	"DJ"	NCT 127	Ay-Yo	Writer, co-producer
2023	"Skyscraper"	NCT 127	Ay-Yo	Writer, co-producer
2023	"Best Friend Ever"	NCT Dream	Best Friend Ever	Co-writer
2023	"Golden Hour"	Mark	SM Station: NCT Lab	Co-writer
2023	"Like We Just Met"	NCT Dream	ISTJ	Co-writer, co-producer
2023	"Angel Eyes"	NCT 127	Fact Check	Co-writer, co-producer
2023	"Love Is A Beauty"	NCT 127	Fact Check	Co-writer, co-producer
2023	"Misty"	NCT 127	Fact Check	Co-writer, co-producer
2023	"Marine Turtle" (Korean ver.)	Kun, Xiaojun, Renjun, Chenle	SM Station: NCT Lab	Co-writer
2023	"White Lie"	NCT 127	Be There For Me	Co-writer, co-producer
2024	"Box"	NCT Dream	Dream()Scape	Co-writer, co-producer
2024	"Unknown"	NCT Dream	Dream()Scape	Co-writer, co-producer
2024	"Breathing"	NCT Dream	Dream()Scape	Co-writer, co-producer
2024	"Time Machine"	Doyoung, Taeyeon, Mark	Youth	Co-writer
2024	"200" (Note: including the "Minhyung version".)	Mark	The Firstfruit	Co-writer, co-producer
2024	"Sunkissed"	Big Naughty, Mark	Non-album release	Co-writer, co-producer
2024	"Rains in Heaven"	NCT Dream	Dreamscape	Co-writer
2024	"When I'm with You"	NCT Dream	Dreamscape	Co-writer, co-producer
2024	"I Hate Fruits"	NCT Dream	Dreamscape	Co-writer
2024	"Fraktsiya"	Mark, Lee Young Ji	The Firstfruit	Co-writer, co-producer
2025	"+82 Pressin’"	Mark, Haechan	The Firstfruit	Co-writer
2025	"Toronto’s Window"	Mark	The Firstfruit	Co-writer
2025	"1999"	Mark	The Firstfruit	Co-writer, co-producer
2025	"Flight to NYC"	Mark	The Firstfruit	Co-writer
2025	"Righteous"	Mark	The Firstfruit	Co-writer, co-producer
2025	"Raincouver"	Mark	The Firstfruit	Co-writer
2025	"Loser"	Mark	The Firstfruit	Co-writer, co-producer
2025	"Watching TV"	Mark, Crush	The Firstfruit	Co-writer, co-producer
2025	"Journey Mercies"	Mark	The Firstfruit	Co-writer, co-producer
2025	"Mom’s Interlude"	Mark	The Firstfruit	Co-writer, co-producer
2025	"Too Much"	Mark	The Firstfruit	Co-writer, co-producer

== Music videos ==
Title	Year	Director(s)	Ref.
"Young & Free" (with Xiumin)	2017	Unknown	—N/a
"Lemonade Love" (with Parc Jae-jung)	2017	Unknown	—N/a
"Child"	2022	Unknown	—N/a
"Golden Hour"	2023	Eehosoo (cpbeq)	
"200"	2024	Eehosoo (cpbeq)	
"Fraktsiya (feat. Lee Young-ji)	2024	Giseong Jun (ES4X)	
"+82 Pressin'" (feat. Haechan)	2025	Cheol-ho Park	
"1999"	2025	Vin Kim (Kepler Lab)	
