= Young & Free =

Young & Free may refer to:

- Hillsong Young & Free, a contemporary Christian worship band
- Young & Free (Xiumin and Mark song), 2017
- Young & Free (Dermot Kennedy song), 2018

== See also ==
- Young and Free, a 1987 album by Rock Goddess
