= Baek Soo-hee =

South Korean actress (born 1992)

- Born: Baek Soo-hee; 30 October 1992 (age 33); South Korea
- Other names: Baek Soo-hui, Baek Su-hui, Baek Su-hi
- Education: Sungshin Women's University (Bachelor of Media and Visual Acting)
- Occupations: Actress; model
- Years active: 2014–present
- Agent: Woongbin Ens
- Known for: Be Melodramatic; Mystic Pop-up Bar; Was It Love?

Baek Soo-hee is a South Korean actress. She is known for her roles in dramas such as Be Melodramatic, Soul Mechanic, Mystic Pop-up Bar and Was It Love?.

== Filmography ==
=== Television series ===
Year	Title	Role	Ref.
2014	Hi! School: Love On	Eun-bi	
2019	KBS Drama Special: Socialization – Understanding of Dance	Soo-yun	
2019	Be Melodramatic	Im Ji-young	
2020	Mystic Pop-up Bar	Kim Da-bin	
2020	Soul Mechanic	Kim Yoo-ra	
2020	Was It Love?	Choi Hye-jin	
2021	Peng	Ye Soo-won	
2023	Agency	Jung Su-jeong	
2023	Between Him and Her	Yoon Yoo-ju	

=== Web series ===
Year	Title	Role	Ref.
2016	Between Friendship and Love	Sa-rang	
2017	Office Watch	Lee Sa-rang	
2018	A-Teen	Lee Jung-min	
2018	Office Watch 2	Lee Sa-rang / Lee Sa-ra	
2018	Room of Romance	Lee Sa-rang	
2018	Lemon Car Video	Ji-soo	
2019	Office Watch 3	Lee Sa-rang	
2019	A-Teen 2	Lee Jung-min	
2023	Adult Kids	Moon Hee-jeong	
2024	Flex X Cop	Kim Jeong-yeon	
2025	I Will Repay Infidelity with Infidelity		

=== Film ===
Year	Title	Role	Ref.
2015	Twenty	Min-jung	
2019	Jesters: The Game Changers	Dodo	
2021	Corner	Seong's friend	
2022	Hot Blooded	Jenny	

=== Music video appearances ===
Year	Title	Artist	Length	Ref.
2018	The Time You Stayed With Me	Yook Sung-jae	04:41	
