= Mystic Pop-up Bar =

2020 South Korean television series

- Promotional poster
- Hangul: 쌍갑포차
- Hanja: 雙甲布車
- Lit.: Twin Tops Bar
- RR: Ssanggappocha
- MR: Ssanggapp'och'a
- Genre: Drama; Fantasy; Mystery; Comedy; Supernatural
- Based on: Twin Tops Bar by Bae Hye-soo
- Written by: Ha Yoon-ah
- Directed by: Jeon Chang-geun
- Starring: Hwang Jung-eum; Yook Sung-jae; Choi Won-young
- Music by: Gaemi
- Country of origin: South Korea
- Original language: Korean
- No. of episodes: 12

Production
- Executive producer: Oh Hwan-min
- Producer: Kim Bo-kyung
- Running time: 70 minutes
- Production companies: Drama House; Samhwa Networks
- Budget: ₩8.6 billion

Original release
- Network: JTBC
- Release: May 20 – June 25, 2020

Mystic Pop-up Bar (Korean: 쌍갑포차) is a 2020 South Korean television series starring Hwang Jung-eum, Yook Sung-jae and Choi Won-young. Based on the Daum webtoon Twin Tops Bar by Bae Hye-soo, it is the first series to air on JTBC's Wednesday–Thursday time slot in eight years. The series aired from May 20 to June 25, 2020.

== Synopsis ==
Mystic Pop-up Bar tells the story of a mysterious pojangmacha (outdoor drinking establishment) run by an ill-tempered woman named Weol-ju (Hwang Jung-eum), an innocent part-time employee named Han Kang-bae (Yook Sung-jae), and a former afterlife detective known as Chief Gwi (Choi Won-young) who visit customers in their dreams to help resolve their problems. Kang-bae has a unique ability that is useful to Weol-ju - with a touch, he can make people pour out all their troubles. This is very useful to Weol-ju who needs to settle the grudges of 100,000 souls.

== Cast ==
=== Main ===
- Hwang Jung-eum as Weol-ju
  - Park Si-eun as young Weol-ju

A hot-tempered woman who is the owner of Mystic Pop-up Bar. 500 years ago, Weol-ju healed the Crown Prince through his dreams but was falsely accused of seducing him, and was targeted by an assassin who killed Weol-ju's mother instead. Weol-ju's sin was committing suicide on the Sacred Tree, causing it to lose its power on a conflict that took 100,000 lives. For the past 500 years, she was sent to the Living Realm to settle the grudges of 100,000 souls and comfort them as a punishment to atone for her past sin.

- Yook Sung-jae as Han Kang-bae

A cheerful young man who has the ability to make people confess the truth by making physical contact with them. Hence, he creeps the people around him out and grew up being an outcast. He worked with Weol-ju as she promised him to get rid of this unique ability in exchange. He is eventually revealed to be the spirit of Weol-ju and Yi-Hon's unborn child which was cursed with the Sorrow of the Sacred Tree.

- Choi Won-young as Chief Gwi (aka Guibanjang) / Crown Prince Yi-Hon
  - Song Geon-hee as young Crown Prince Yi-hon

Formerly the Crown Prince who fell in love with Weol-ju but was unable to protect her, so he slew the instigator of her death, his former best friend, Kim Won-hyung. Once worked for the Afterlife Police Agency, he was given a chance to work as the manager at Mystic Pop-up Bar to be at Weol-ju's side.

=== Supporting ===
==== Realm of the Dead ====
- Yeom Hye-ran as God of the Underworld, Yeomradaewang

As the God of the Underworld, she is the one who executed the 500-years-long punishment on Weol-ju.

- Lee Jun-hyeok as Department Chief Yeom / Lord Kim Jin

In his past life, he was a minister at the palace, mentor of the Crown Prince and father of Won-hyung. His loyalty and dedication for the prince had driven him away from his son. In the present, he became a jeoseung saja, or angel of death, who is Chief Gwi's best friend and frequently visit Weol-ju's pop-up bar.

- Na In-woo as Kim Won-hyung

He is Lord Kim Jin's son and Crown Prince Yi-hon's best friend, however his coup d'état was uncovered and he was beheaded by the Crown Prince on his sister's and prince's wedding day. In present day, he escaped from his punishment as an evil spirit to get revenge upon Crown Prince Yi-hon and Weol-ju.

- Oh Young-sil as Samsin

The goddess of childbirth and fate. She is a close friend of Weol-ju.

- Yoo Jae-myung as Jade Emperor (voice only)

==== Kapeul Mart ====
- Jung Da-eun as Kang Yeo-rin

The only human who is immune to Kang-bae's ability. She was Chairman Choi's personal bodyguard but after her encounter with Weol-ju and Kang-bae, she was fired from her job and eventually became a security guard of Kapeul Mart. Although Kang-bae and Yeo-rin love each other, her trauma with her past boyfriends causes her to deny her feelings. She is later revealed to be the reincarnation the spirit of the Cinnabar in a nearby cave, a mineral that protects against evil.

- Ahn Tae-hwan as Choi Jin-dong

A brash coworker of Han Kang-bae and the closest Kang-bae has to a friend. He lives with his grandmother and cares about her a lot. It is later revealed he stems from a long line of working-class ancestry.

- Na Seung-Ho as Ma Seung-Ho

A coworker of Han Kang-bae who is often seen together with Jin-dong.

- Baek Soo-hee as Kim Da-bin

Roommate and seemingly only friend of Yeo-rin. She often tries to give Yeo-rin (conventional) dating-advice and pushes her towards being assertive with Kang-bae.

- Park Ha-na as Song Mi-ran

A friendly employee of Kapeul Mart who works at a station handing out samples of grilled meat to customers.

- Park Joo-hyung as Assistant Manager Park

=== Special appearances ===
- Park Eun-hye as Crown Prince's mother / Shin Ji-hye (Ep. 1, 9–10)
- Kim Hee-jung as Wol-joo's mother (Ep. 1, 9)
- Yang Dae-hyuk as Bad customer at Gapeul Mart (Ep. 1)
- Hwang Bo-ra as Chun-hyang (Ep. 1)
- Lee Sang-hwa as Heung-bu (Ep. 1)
- Kwak Sun-young as Eun-soo / Sun-hwa (Ep. 2)
- Seo Ji-hye as Han Kang-bae's dream girlfriend (Ep. 2)
- Baek Ji-won as Ms. Andong (Ep. 2)
- Youn-a as lady-in-waiting (Ep. 3)
- Yoo Sung-joo as Chairman Choi / Local governor (Ep. 3)
- Oh Kyung-joo as Park Byung-jae (Ep. 3)
- Oh Ha-nee as Yu-mi (Ep. 3)
- Woo Hyun as Kim Du-young (Ep. 4)
- Jung Eun-pyo as Choi Seok-pan (Ep. 4)
- Lee Joo-shil as Lee Kkeut-sun (Ep.4)
- Jung Jung-ah as upset customer (Ep. 5)
- Oh Man-seok (stage actor) as Oh Sang-gun (Ep. 5)
- Lee Ji-hyun as Jin-seok (Ep. 5)
- Kim Mi-hwa as health drink vendor (Ep. 5)
- Kwon Hyeok-soo as a company executive (Ep. 5)
- Lee Seo-an as Chae Su-gyung (Ep. 6)
- Tae In-ho as Kang In-ho (Ep. 6)
- Yoon Park as The Gout Lovers actor (Ep. 6)
- Ha Shi-eun as The Gout Lovers actress (Ep.6)
- Choi Dae-hoon as Jang Bok-su (Ep. 7)
- Hwang Hyo-eun as Mrs. Kim (Ep. 7)
- Park Young-soo as Mr. Jang (Ep. 7)
- Kim Yong-gun as Kapeul Mart Chairman (Ep. 7)
- Han So-eun as Shin Bo-ra / Ice Witch (Ep. 8)
- Shin Hyun-soo as Kim Do-young (Ep. 8)
- Moon Jeong-hee as Hyun-ok (Ep. 9)
- So Chan-whee as herself (Ep. 11)
- Ahn Chang-hwan as Mr. Han (Ep. 12)
- Lee Soo-ji as Mr. Han's co-worker (Ep. 12)

== Production ==
The first script reading took place in August 2019 at JTBC Building in Sangam-dong, Seoul, South Korea.

The filming began in September 2019 and ended on February 28, 2020.

== Original soundtrack ==
Mystic Pop-up Bar OST

Soundtrack album by Various Artists
- Released: 2020
- Genre: Soundtrack
- Languages: Korean; English
- Labels: JTBC Studio; Most Content; Kakao M

=== Part 1 ===
Released on May 28, 2020
No.	Title	Lyrics	Music	Artist	Length
1.	"Dive"	ColdoK; Oh Soo-yeon	ColdoK; Oh Soo-yeon	Jung Jin-woo	3:23
2.	"Dive" (Inst.)		ColdoK; Oh Soo-yeon		3:23
Total length:					6:46

=== Part 2 ===
Released on June 4, 2020
No.	Title	Lyrics	Music	Artist	Length
1.	"Love Resembles Memories" (사랑은 추억을 닮아서)	Gaemi	Gaemi; ZigZag Note	Yook Sung-jae (BtoB)	3:47
2.	"Love Resembles Memories" (Inst.)		Gaemi; ZigZag Note		3:47
Total length:					7:34

=== Part 3 ===
Released on June 11, 2020
No.	Title	Lyrics	Music	Artist	Length
1.	"I'll Be"	Chansline	Hwang Chan-hee; Chansline	Ben	3:59
2.	"I'll Be" (Inst.)		Hwang Chan-hee; Chansline		3:59
Total length:					7:58

=== Part 4 ===
Released on June 18, 2020
No.	Title	Lyrics	Music	Artist	Length
1.	"When We Were Together" (우리가 함께했던 날들)	Gaemi; yoda; midnight	Gaemi; Kim Se-jin; midnight	Jo Hyun-ah (Urban Zakapa)	3:44
2.	"When We Were Together" (Inst.)		Gaemi; Kim Se-jin; midnight		3:44
Total length:					7:28

=== Part 5 ===
Released on June 25, 2020
No.	Title	Lyrics	Music	Artist	Length
1.	"I'll Take You to Tomorrow" (내일에 바래다줄게)	yoda	Gaemi	DMEANOR	3:43
2.	"I'll Take You to Tomorrow" (Inst.)		Gaemi		3:43
Total length:					7:26

== Ratings ==
Mystic Pop-up Bar : South Korea viewers per episode (thousands)

Season	Episode number												Average
Season	1	2	3	4	5	6	7	8	9	10	11	12	Average
1	808	N/A	854	N/A	698	572	688	646	715	690	651	827	N/A

Source: Audience measurement performed nationwide by Nielsen Korea.

Average TV viewership ratings
Ep.	Original broadcast date	Average audience share (Nielsen Korea)	
Ep.	Original broadcast date	Nationwide	Seoul
1	May 20, 2020	3.610%	4.186%
2	May 21, 2020	1.884%	—N/a
3	May 27, 2020	3.672%	3.914%
4	May 28, 2020	1.557%	—N/a
5	June 3, 2020	3.141%	3.769%
6	June 4, 2020	2.485%	—N/a
7	June 10, 2020	3.237%	3.562%
8	June 11, 2020	2.941%	2.990%
9	June 17, 2020	3.139%	3.076%
10	June 18, 2020	3.009%	3.095%
11	June 24, 2020	2.782%	3.216%
12	June 25, 2020	3.558%	3.603%
Average		2.918%	— (Note: Due to some ratings not recorded, the exact average rating is unknown.)
In the table above, the blue numbers represent the lowest ratings and the red numbers represent the highest ratings.; N/A denotes that the rating is not known.; This drama aired on a cable channel/pay TV which normally has a relatively smaller audience compared to free-to-air TV/public broadcasters (KBS, SBS, MBC and EBS).
