= Exo Next Door =

- Also known as: Exo Lives Next Door; Exo Lives Next Door to My House
- Genre: Web series
- Written by: Shin Yeon-joo; Hwang Ji-eon
- Directed by: Lee Kwon
- Starring: Exo; Moon Ka-young
- Country of origin: South Korea
- Original language: Korean
- No. of episodes: 16

Production
- Producers: Kim Young-min; Park Seong-hye
- Running time: 15 minutes Tuesdays and Thursdays at 22:00 (KST)
- Production companies: Oh!Boy Project; SM Entertainment; LINE

Original release
- Network: Naver TV Cast; JTBC2
- Release: April 9 – May 28, 2015

Exo Next Door (Korean: 우리 옆집에 엑소가 산다; RR: Uri yeopjibe Eksoga sanda; lit. 'Exo Lives Next Door to My House') is a 2015 South Korean web series starring Moon Ka-young and members of the K-pop boy band Exo (with the latter playing fictionalized versions of themselves). It aired on Naver TV Cast from April 9 to May 28, 2015, on Tuesdays and Thursdays at 22:00 for 16 episodes.

Exo Next Door became one of the most popular web series in Korea with 50 million views; this led to CJ E&M re-editing it into a film version, which was then sold to overseas buyers at the 68th Cannes Film Market.

== Plot ==
Ji Yeon-hee (Moon Ka-young) is an extremely shy, introverted 23-year-old woman with zero dating experience and a tendency to blush when talking to someone she likes. One day, four young men move into the house right next door to Yeon-hee's home, and to her surprise, they turn out to be Chanyeol (Park Chanyeol), D.O. (Doh Kyung-soo), Baekhyun (Byun Baekhyun), and Sehun (Oh Sehun) from her favorite boy band Exo, who are looking to lie low for a while. They hire her to clean their house part-time during the winter vacation, and that's when Yeon-hee finds out that Chanyeol is her long lost childhood friend and crush "Chan", and that he is the grandson of the owner of the house. As the story goes on, Yeon-hee becomes involved in a love triangle with Chanyeol and D.O.

== Cast ==
=== Main cast ===
- Park Chanyeol as Chanyeol
  - Jung Jae-hyuk as young Chanyeol
- Moon Ga-young as Ji Yeon-hee
  - Han Seo-jin as young Ji Yeon-hee
- Doh Kyung-soo as D.O.
- Byun Baek-hyun as Baekhyun
- Oh Se-hun as Sehun

=== Supporting cast ===
- Jang Yoo-sang as Ji Kwang-soo
- Kim Jong-in as Kai
- Kim Jun-myeon as Suho
- Kim Min-seok as Xiumin
- Zhang Yixing as Lay
- Kim Jong-dae as Chen
- Huang Zitao as Tao
- Kim Hee-jung as Yeon-hee's mother
- Jeon Soo-jin as Ga-eun
- Yoon Joo-sang as Chanyeol's grandfather
- Jung Si-hyun as Min-hwan

== Original soundtracks ==
Release date	Song Title	Artist	Peak Chart Positions		Sales
Release date	Song Title	Artist	KOR Gaon	CHN Baidu	Sales
April 22, 2015	"Beautiful"	Baekhyun	7	1	KOR: 415,163+
April 22, 2015	"Sweet Dream"	Jamong	—	—	—N/a

"Beautiful" became the first OST single from a web drama to top streaming platform digital charts in South Korea.

== Awards and nominations ==
Year	Award	Category	Recipient	Result
2015	8th Korea Drama Awards	Best New Actor	Park Chanyeol	Won
2015	8th Korea Drama Awards	Hallyu Star Award	Park Chanyeol	Won
