= It's Dangerous Beyond the Blankets =

- Promotional poster for the pilot episode.
- Genre: Reality, Variety Show
- Written by: Kim Hyun-kyung; Son Mi-na
- Directed by: Choi Haeng-ho; Lee Yoon-hwa
- Starring: Kang Daniel; Xiumin; Yong Jun-hyung; Mark Lee; Tak Jae-hoon; Lee Pil-mo; Lee Sang-woo; Chang Ki-ha; Lee Yi-kyung; Kim Min-seok; Loco; Parc Jae-jung; Koo Jun-hoe; Jeong Se-woon; Song Min-ho
- Country of origin: South Korea
- Original language: Korean
- No. of seasons: 2
- No. of episodes: 14

Production
- Running time: 80 minutes

Original release
- Network: MBC
- Release: August 27, 2017 – July 12, 2018

It's Dangerous Beyond The Blankets (Korean: 이불 밖은 위험해; RR: Ibul bakkeun wiheomhae) is a South Korean variety show. The show features "homebodies", people who love to stay home doing nothing, going on a trip together.

The first season consisted of 3 pilot episodes, which were aired from August 27, 2017 to September 10, 2017.

The second season aired every Thursday at 23:10 (KST), from April 5, 2018 to July 12, 2018.

== Cast ==
=== Season 1 (Pilot) ===
Name	Profession	Birthday
Jo Jung-chi	Singer	August 25, 1978
Kang Daniel (Wanna One)	Singer	December 10, 1996
Lee Sang-woo	Actor	February 13, 1980
Parc Jae-jung	Singer	December 25, 1995
Xiumin (EXO)	Singer	March 26, 1990
Yong Jun-hyung (Highlight)	Singer	December 19, 1989

=== Season 2 ===
Name	Profession	Birthday
Gray	Singer, Rapper	December 8, 1986
Chang Kiha	Singer-songwriter	February 20, 1982
Jeong Se-woon	Singer	May 31, 1997
Kang Daniel (Wanna One)	Singer	December 10, 1996
Kim Min-seok	Actor	January 24, 1990
Kim Min-seok	Olympic Speed Skater	June 14, 1999
Koo Jun-hoe (iKon)	Singer	March 31, 1997
Lee Pil-mo	Actor	June 26, 1974
Lee Yi-kyung	Actor	January 8, 1989
Loco	Rapper	December 25, 1989
Mark (NCT)	Singer, Rapper	August 2, 1999
Mino (WINNER)	Rapper, Songwriter	March 30, 1993
Tak Jae-hoon	Singer, Entertainer	July 24, 1968
Woo Won-Jae	Rapper	December 23, 1996
Xiumin (EXO)	Singer	March 26, 1990
Yong Jun-hyung (Highlight)	Singer, Rapper, Songwriter	December 19, 1989

== Episodes ==
=== Season 1 (Pilot) ===
The first season consists of 3 pilot episodes, starring Lee Sang-woo, Yong Jun-hyung of Highlight, singer Parc Jae-jung, Kang Daniel of Wanna One, Xiumin of Exo, and singer Jo Jung-chi.

Episodes	Broadcast Date	Episode Title	Appearance(s)	Notes
1	August 27, 2017	Homebody goes on a trip	Lee Sang-woo, Yong Jun-hyung, Parc Jae-jung, Kang Daniel, Xiumin, Jo Jung-chi	
2	September 3, 2017		Lee Sang-woo, Yong Jun-hyung, Parc Jae-jung, Kang Daniel, Xiumin, Jo Jung-chi	
3	September 10, 2017		Lee Sang-woo, Yong Jun-hyung, Parc Jae-jung, Kang Daniel, Xiumin, Jo Jung-chi	
4	October 3, 2017		Lee Sang-woo, Yong Jun-hyung, Parc Jae-jung, Kang Daniel, Xiumin, Jo Jung-chi	Chuseok Special

=== Season 2 ===
The second season of the show stars returning cast members Kang Daniel, Xiumin and Yong Jun-hyung, along with new cast members. The production staff stated, "We are looking for celebrity homebodies from all walks of life. These homebodies with different personalities will be grouped into units of four to six people, who will then go on a trip together."

Episode	Broadcast Date	Episode Title	Location	Appearance(s)
1	April 5, 2018	The Homebodies' First Meeting, Orientation in Gapyeong	Gapyeong, Gyeonggi Province	Tak Jae-hoon, Lee Pil-mo, Lee Yi-kyung, Loco, Kim Min-seok, Kang Daniel
2	April 12, 2018	The Homebodies' First Meeting, Orientation in Gapyeong	Gapyeong, Gyeonggi Province	Tak Jae-hoon, Lee Pil-mo, Lee Yi-kyung, Loco, Kim Min-seok, Kang Daniel
2	April 12, 2018	The First Idle Vacation	Chuncheon, Gangwon Province	Jang Ki-ha, Loco, Kim Min Seok, Jung Se-woon, Koo Jun-hoe
3	April 19, 2018	The First Idle Vacation	Chuncheon, Gangwon Province	Jang Ki-ha, Loco, Kim Min Seok, Jung Se-woon, Koo Jun-hoe
3	April 19, 2018	The Second Idle Vacation	Jeju Island	Lee Yi-Kyung, Kang Daniel
4	May 3, 2018	The Second Idle Vacation	Jeju Island	Jang Ki-ha, Lee Yi-Kyung, Loco, Kang Daniel
5	May 10, 2018	The Second Idle Vacation	Jeju Island	Jang Ki-ha, Lee Yi-Kyung, Loco, Kang Daniel
6	May 17, 2018		Namhae, South Gyeongsang Province	Loco, Kim Min-seok, Xiumin, Song Minho, Kim Min-Seok (speed skater)
7	May 24, 2018		Namhae, South Gyeongsang Province	Kim Min-seok, Xiumin, Song Minho, Kim Min-Seok (speed skater)
8	May 31, 2018	The Homebodies' First Overseas Vacation	Da Nang, Vietnam	Kang Daniel, Mark Lee, Lee Yi-Kyung, Yong Jun-Hyung
9	July 5, 2018	The Homebodies' First Overseas Vacation	Da Nang, Vietnam	Kang Daniel, Mark Lee, Lee Yi-Kyung, Yong Jun-Hyung
10	July 12, 2018		Paju, Gyeonggi Province	Kang Daniel, Mark Lee, Lee Yi-Kyung, Yong Jun-Hyung, Loco, Gray, Woo Won-Jae

== Ratings ==
In the tables below, the blue numbers represent the lowest ratings and the red numbers represent the highest ratings.

=== Season 1 (Pilot) ===
Episode	Broadcast Date	Average audience share	
Episode	Broadcast Date	AGB Nielsen	TNmS
1	August 27, 2017	5.0%	4.5%
2	September 3, 2017	2.4%	3.1%
3	September 10, 2017	3.8%	3.2%

=== Season 2 ===
Episode	Broadcast Date	Average audience share (nationwide)	
Episode	Broadcast Date	AGB Nielsen	TNmS
1	April 5, 2018	2.2%	3.4%
2	April 12, 2018	2.5%	2.5%
3	April 19, 2018	2.2%	2.5%
4	May 3, 2018	2.0%	1.9%
5	May 10, 2018	2.0%	1.7%
6	May 17, 2018	1.5%	1.4%
7	May 24, 2018	2.0%	2.5%
8	May 31, 2018	1.6%	2.6%
9	July 5, 2018	1.1%	1.3%
10	July 12, 2018	1.5%	1.7%

- Episode 9 was not aired on June 7, 2018 due to the broadcast of the Seoul mayoral debate for the 2018 local elections.
- The show went on hiatus from June 14, 2018 to July 5, 2018 due to the broadcast of the 2018 World Cup in Moscow, Russia.

== Accolade ==
Year	Award	Category	Recipient	Result	Ref.
2018	MBC Entertainment Awards	Male Rookie Award – Variety	Kang Daniel	Won	
