= Jang Yoo-sang =

South Korean actor (born 1991)

- Born: Jang Yoo-Sang; 28 September 1991 (age 34); Seoul, South Korea
- Other name: Jang Yu-sang
- Education: Sejong University (Department of Film and Art)
- Occupation: Actor
- Years active: 2013–present
- Agent: SM Culture & Contents
- Known for: Love with Flaws; Exo Next Door; Queen of Mystery 2

Jang Yoo-sang is a South Korean actor. He is known for his lead roles in One Night Only, Set Play, and Stay with Me. He is also known for his supporting roles in dramas such as Exo Next Door and Queen of Mystery 2. He also appeared in Love with Flaws as Choi Ho-dol.

== Filmography ==
=== Television ===
Year	Title	Role	Ref.
2015	Angry Mom	Oh Geun-soo	
2015	Exo Next Door	Kwang-soo	
2015	Falling for Challenge	Nam Gong-dae	
2016	Explicit Innocence	Young-seok	
2017	The Boy Next Door	Seung-jong	
2017	Save Me	Im Sang-jin	
2018	Queen of Mystery 2	Kim Yi-kyung	
2018	Suits	Park Joon-gyu	
2018	Feel Good to Die	Lee Young-doo	
2019	Legal High	Kim Yi-soo	
2019	Flower Crew: Joseon Marriage Agency	Kang / Pal-poon	
2019	Love with Flaws	Choi Ho-dol	
2020	Soul Mechanic	Im Se-chan	
2020	SF8	Ga Young-in (Episode: "Empty Body")	
2020	Get Revenge	Choi Do-yoon	
2022	KBS Drama Special – Silence of the Lambs	Yoon Dae-beom	
2022	The King of the Desert	Lee Jung-wook	

=== Film ===
Year	Title	Role	Ref.
2014	One Night Only	Hoon	
2014	Set Me Free	Min-jae	
2015	The Magician	Meok-soi	
2016	Stay with Me	Lee-sub	
2019	Set Play	Ki-joon	
2020	ID Card	Dong-gu	
2020	Set Play	Ki-joon	
2021	LIMECRIME	Joo-yeon	
2022	Re-Born	Seung-beom	
