= Between Him and Her =

2023–2024 South Korean television series

- Promotional poster
- Hangul: 남과여
- Lit.: Man and Woman
- RR: Namgwayeo
- MR: Namgwayŏ
- Genre: Romance drama
- Based on: Man and Woman by Hyeono
- Developed by: Channel A (planning); Jung Hoe-wook
- Written by: Park Sang-min
- Directed by: Lee Yoo-yeon; Park Sang-min
- Starring: Lee Donghae; Lee Seol; Im Jae-hyuk; Yoon Ye-ju; Choi Won-myeong; Baek Soo-hee; Kim Hyun-mok; Park Jeong-hwa; Yeon Je-hyung
- Country of origin: South Korea
- Original language: Korean
- No. of episodes: 12

Production
- Executive producers: Park Jong-eun (CP); Kim Yeon-kyung; Go Yoo-kyung
- Producers: So Jun-beom; Oh Hwan-min; Kim Kyung-tae; Park Dong-hwi; Kwak Jin-woo; Jo Hyun-seo
- Production companies: Studio Goat; The Great Show

Original release
- Network: Channel A
- Release: December 26, 2023 – March 15, 2024

Between Him and Her (Korean: 남과여) is a 2023–2024 South Korean television series starring Lee Donghae, Lee Seol, Im Jae-hyuk, Yoon Ye-ju, Choi Won-myeong, Baek Soo-hee, Kim Hyun-mok, Park Jeong-hwa, and Yeon Je-hyung. Based on a webtoon of the same Korean name by Hyeono, it depicts the story of a long-term couple in a seven-year relationship who break up due to a momentary mistake. It aired on Channel A from December 26, 2023, to March 15, 2024, every Tuesday at 22:30 (KST) for its first four episodes and every Friday at 23:10 (KST) beginning with its fifth episode. The series is also available for streaming on TVING in South Korea, and on Viki in selected regions.

== Synopsis ==
Between Him and Her tells a realistic and relatable romance between young people wandering in love and boredom, who face each other in front of a motel elevator on the night of their seventh-year relationship.

== Cast ==
=== Main ===
- Lee Donghae as Jung Hyun-seong: a man who ambitiously launches a street fashion brand, but is struggling.
- Lee Seol as Han Seong-ok: a jewelry designer who has been dating Hyun-seong for seven years.
- Im Jae-hyuk as Oh Min-hyuk: a person who is not interested in employment, dating, or marriage.
- Yoon Ye-ju as Kim Hye-ryung: a kindergarten teacher.
- Choi Won-myeong as Ahn Si-hoo: a man who constantly makes flirtatious comments to Yoo-ju, who is six years older than him.
- Baek Soo-hee as Yoon Yoo-ju: a realistic person who wants a stable relationship.
- Kim Hyun-mok as Kim Hyung-seop: Hyun-seong's best friend who is the son of a dim sum franchise president.
- Park Jeong-hwa as Ryu Eun-jeong: Seong-ok's best friend who is a sports clothing model and a social media influencer.
- Yeon Je-hyung as Kim Geon-yeop: a warm-hearted person and Seong-ok's junior in college.

=== Supporting ===
==== People related to Seong-ok and Hyun-seong ====
- Baek Sung-hyun as Kim Jong-hyun: Seong-ok's college senior who is a jewelry brand designer.
- Shin Eun-jung as Choi Myung-sook: Seong-ok's mother.

==== People related to Min-hyuk and Hye-ryung ====
- Lee Hwi-seo as Jang Eun-ji: Min-hyuk and Hye-ryung's middle and high school classmate.
- Kang Jun-gyu as Bu Jong-min: Min-hyuk and Hye-ryung's middle and high school classmate.
- Baek Seon-ho as Jang Eun-woo: a model.

==== People at Windus ====
- Yang Taek-ho as Park Jun-beom: founder of fashion platform Windus.
- Lee Ki-hyun as Lee Myung-jin: lead designer at Windus.
- Park Chang-hoon as Park Dong-hoon: a designer at Windus.

== Ratings ==
The fourth episode of Man and Woman which aired on January 16, 2024 drew a rating of 0.168%. It is a significantly lower score compared to other Channel A dramas, which recorded viewership ratings of at least 1–2%. Following this, the network changed its time slot from Tuesday at 22:30 (KST) to Friday at 23:10 (KST), starting with its fifth episode which will be aired on January 26, 2024.

Average TV viewership ratings (nationwide)
Ep.	Original broadcast date	Average audience share (Nielsen Korea)
1	December 26, 2023	0.5% (47th)
2	January 2, 2024	0.432% (51st)
3	January 9, 2024	0.429% (52nd)
4	January 16, 2024	0.168% (68th)
5	January 26, 2024	0.33% (49th)
6	February 2, 2024	0.278% (57th)
7	February 9, 2024	0.314% (54th)
8	February 16, 2024	0.163% (64th)
9	February 23, 2024	0.367% (52nd)
10	March 1, 2024	0.210% (63rd)
11	March 8, 2024	0.366% (49th)
12	March 15, 2024	0.218% (60th)
Average		0.315%
In the table above, the blue numbers represent the lowest ratings and the red numbers represent the highest ratings.; This series aired on a cable channel/pay TV which normally has a relatively smaller audience compared to free-to-air TV/public broadcasters (KBS, SBS, MBC and EBS).
