= Interview X =

- Digital cover

EP by Xiumin
- Released: March 10, 2025
- Genre: K-pop
- Length: 16:54
- Languages: Korean; English
- Labels: INB100; ADA

Xiumin chronology
Brand New (2022)	Interview X (2025)

Singles from Interview X
- 1. "Whee!" Released: March 10, 2025

Interview X is the second extended play by South Korean singer and actor Xiumin. It was released on March 10, 2025, by INB100. The EP features six tracks in total, including the title track "Whee!".

== Background and release ==
Xiumin debuted as a solo artist in September 2022, with the EP Brand New. On February 4, 2025, almost three years since debuting as a soloist, it was reported that he was preparing for a new album targeting to release in March. In addition, this would be Xiumin's first solo release under INB100, an entertainment company founded by his fellow Exo and Exo-CBX member Baekhyun in 2023. Ten days later, INB100 announced that Xiumin would be releasing his second EP titled Interview X on March 10. On February 17, INB100 revealed the scheduler with various contents for the EP. On the same day, the pre-order for the EP started at 14:00 (KST) until March 9, and it comes in three versions: Interviewbook, Photobook, and Kiwi Album. On February 19, INB100 released the trailer for the EP on their YouTube channel. The tracklist for the EP was unveiled on February 21, which includes the title track "Whee!" and five other songs and labelmate Chen wrote the lyrics for the track "Love Is U". On February 24, INB100 announced that Xiumin will hold a fan concert titled "X Times ( )" at Blue Square Mastercard Hall in Seoul on March 22, with two shows at 14:00 (KST) and 19:00 (KST). While the Asia tour will run across five cities from April to May 2025.

On March 3, 2025, INB100 released a video that contained the highlights each of the songs in the EP through their YouTube channel. The music video teasers for the title track was released on March 6 and 8, respectively. On March 10, Xiumin released his second EP along with the single "Whee!" and its music video.

== Promotion ==
One Hundred, Xiumin's label's parent company released a statement on March 4, 2025, that KBS has blocked Xiumin to appear on Music Bank because of SM Entertainment. In response, KBS denied the allegations and added that the production team of Music Bank has continuously communicating with INB100.

== Track listing ==
Interview X track listing
No.	Title	Lyrics	Music	Arrangement	Length
1.	"Can't Help Myself"	Kang Eun-jeong	Rowan Perkins; Uzoechi Osisioma Emenike; Ayanna Adannay Blair-Ford; Sophie 'Frances' Cooke; TMM	Loxe	1:54
2.	"Whee!"	Park Tae-won	High Brew; Kkannu; Elluii; Levi; Cali; Lavit; Biggtype	High Brew; Kkannu	2:49
3.	"Make You Lala"	Park; Jiwon (153/Joombas)	Kkannu; Ikay; Koa DelaCerna; Peter Farkasovsky; Ryuri; Jeon Ye-chan; Lavit; Biggtype	Kkannu; Ikay	2:57
4.	"Switch Off"	Exy; Sohlhee	Kkannu; Ikay; Wxne; Ryuri; Jeon; Pobee; Joshua Lee; Lavit; Biggtype	Kkannu; Ikay; Wxne; Pobee	3:03
5.	"Lost Paradise"	Ellie Suh (153/Joombas)	Kkannu; Wxne; Jason.K; Cimo Fränkel; Rik Annema; Lavit; Biggtype	Kkannu; Wxne; Jason.K	2:47
6.	"Love Is U"	Kim Jong-dae	Kkannu; Ikay; Koa DelaCerna; Pobee; Jeon Eun-ho; Lavit; Biggtype	Kkannu; Ikay	3:24
Total length:					16:54

== Charts ==
=== Weekly charts ===
Weekly chart performance for Interview X
Chart (2025)	Peak position
Japanese Digital Albums (Oricon)	30
South Korean Albums (Circle)	8

=== Monthly charts ===
Monthly chart performance for Interview X
Chart (2025)	Position
South Korean Albums (Circle)	17

== Release history ==
Release history for Interview X
Region	Date	Format	Label
South Korea	March 10, 2025	CD	INB100; ADA
Various	March 10, 2025	Digital download; streaming	INB100; ADA
