= Brand New (EP) =

2022 EP by Xiumin

- Digital cover

EP by Xiumin
- Released: September 26, 2022
- Recorded: 2022
- Studios: SM Booming System (Seoul); SM Starlight (Seoul); SM Yellow Tail (Seoul)
- Genres: K-pop; hip-hop; new jack swing; synth-pop
- Length: 18:09
- Languages: Korean; English
- Labels: SM; Dreamus
- Producer: Lee Soo-man

Xiumin chronology
Brand New (2022)	Interview X (2025)

Singles from Brand New
- 1. "Brand New" Released: September 26, 2022

Brand New is the debut extended play by South Korean singer and actor Xiumin. It was released on September 26, 2022, by SM Entertainment and Dreamus. Through the release of this EP, Xiumin became the seventh Exo member to debut as a soloist. The EP features five tracks including the lead single of the same name.

== Background ==
On September 1, 2022, Exo's official Twitter account announced that Xiumin will release a new album called Brand New that will be released on September 26.

Xiumin admitted that he felt more responsible and felt eight times more pressured as he is promoting the album alone, instead of with his Exo bandmates.

The album also featured a guest appearance by Mark of NCT, with whom he collaborated before on SM Station Season 2 back in 2017.

== Composition ==
Brand New album contains five tracks spanning across different genres, such as Hip hop, New jack swing, and Synth-pop.

During an interview, Xiumin stated that the theme for this album was inspired by music of 1990s and early 2000s.

== Track listing ==
Brand New track listing
No.	Title	Lyrics	Music	Arrangement	Length
1.	"Brand New"	Kim Hye-jung	Michael "TruPopGod" Jiminez; Blaq Tuxedo; Yoo Young-jin	Michael "TruPopGod" Jiminez; Blaq Tuxedo; Yoo Young-jin	3:04
2.	"Feedback"	Hwang Yu-bin	Daniel Caesar; Gabriela Geneva; Ella Isaacson; Gregory G. Curtis II	Daniel Caesar	3:29
3.	"How We Do" (featuring Mark)	Lee Seu-ran; Mark	HotSauce; Jyll; Andreas Ringblom	HotSauce	3:43
4.	"Love Letter" (민들레; mindeulle; lit. 'Dandelion')	Jeong Jae-yeon	CALi (Vendors); Fascinador (Vendors); Yezi (Vendors); 153/Joombas	Yezi (Vendors)	4:14
5.	"Serenity"	Emily Yeonseo Kim	Emily Yeonseo Kim; JinbyJin	JinbyJin	3:39
Total length:					18:09

== Reception ==
According to Circle Chart, the EP debuted in second place with over 145,000 sold albums in its first week of release.

The Korea Herald gave the EP a positive review, citing "it brings nostalgic '90s sonic euphoria to listeners."

According to Billboard, the title track entry #17 on Billboard's Hot Trending Songs chart.

== Charts ==
Chart performance for Brand New
Chart (2022)	Peak position
South Korean Albums (Circle)	2
Japan (Oricon)	6
Japan (Billboard)	7

== Release history ==
Release history for Brand New
Region	Date	Format	Label
South Korea	September 26, 2022	CD	SM; Dreamus
Various	September 26, 2022	Digital download; streaming	SM
