= CEO-dol Mart =

2023 South Korean television series

- Promotional poster
- Hangul: 사장돌마트
- Hanja: 社長돌마트
- RR: Sajangdol mateu
- MR: Sajangdol mat'ŭ
- Genre: Teen comedy
- Written by: Jang Jung-won
- Directed by: Lee Yoo-yeon
- Starring: Lee Shin-young; Xiumin; Hyungwon; Choi Jung-woon; Choi Won-myeong; Lee Sae-on
- Country of origin: South Korea
- Original language: Korean
- No. of episodes: 10

Production
- Producers: Oh Hwan-min; Kim Gyeong-tae; Ko Yu-gyeom
- Running time: 46–66 minutes
- Production company: The Great Show

Original release
- Network: TVING
- Release: September 15 – October 13, 2023

CEO-dol Mart (Korean: 사장돌마트) is a 2023 South Korean web series, written by Jang Jung-won, directed by Lee Yoo-yeon, and starring Lee Shin-young, Xiumin, Hyungwon, Choi Jung-woon, Choi Won-myeong, and Lee Sae-on. It is an original drama of TVING and is available for streaming on its platform, and on Viki in selected regions. It aired from September 15 to October 13, 2023, every Friday at 16:00 (KST) for 10 episodes.

== Synopsis ==
The series depicts the story of the idol group Thunder Boys, consisting of Choi Ho-rang (Lee Shin-young), Shin Tae-ho (Xiumin), Jo Yi-jun (Hyungwon), Eun Yeong-min (Choi Won-myeong), and Yoon Sang-wu (Lee Sae-on), which disbands due to an unexpected accident, and takes over a failing supermarket (Boram Mart). Oh Ye-rim (Choi Jung-woon), an experienced part-timer with extensive experience in supermarkets, helps in leading the group.

== Cast ==
=== Main ===
- Lee Shin-young as Choi Ho-rang

Leader of the disbanded idol group Thunder Boys. In exchange for unpaid advertising fees, he suddenly takes over Boram Mart and becomes the president, operating the business with the other Thunder Boys' members.

- Xiumin as Shin Tae-ho

Main dancer of the group, and a cashier at the Boram Mart, who is thorough when it comes to calculating money.

- Hyungwon as Jo Yi-jun

Rapper of the group who is in charge of the seafood section at Boram Mart.

- Choi Jung-woon as Oh Ye-rim

A bold person who leads young business owners with 7 years of experience at Boram Mart.

- Choi Won-myeong as Eun Yeong-min

Vocalist of the group, and in charge of the meat section at Boram Mart.

- Lee Sae-on as Yoon Sang-wu

The youngest and most popular member of the group.

=== Supporting ===
- Kim Sha-na as Kim Ji-na

A member of the girl group Chain Girls.

- Lee Sang-jin as Lee Ji-uk

A suspicious customer who creates tension in the supermarket.

- Song Young-jae
