= Falling for Challenge =

South Korean web series

- Official poster
- Also known as: Falling for Dojeon; Falling in Love with a Challenge
- Genre: Web series, Romance, Drama
- Written by: Seo Dong-sung; Im Suk-jin
- Directed by: Lee Ki-pyo; Kim Hyung-jin; Park Ji-an
- Starring: Kim Min-seok; Kim So-eun; Jang Hee-ryung; Jang Yoo-sang
- Opening theme: "You Are The One" by Xiumin
- Country of origin: South Korea
- Original language: Korean
- No. of episodes: 6

Production
- Executive producer: Lee Hyung-min
- Production company: Samsung

Original release
- Network: Naver TV Cast
- Release: October 26 – October 30, 2015

Falling for Challenge (Korean: 도전에 반하다; RR: Dojeone banhada) is a web drama created by Samsung company. The drama stars South Korean actress Kim So-eun and Kim Min-seok. The web drama became the most watched web drama in 2015 with 21,124,965 views. "Falling for Challenge" is one of the most watched web dramas ever, with over 24 million views.

== Plot ==
Na Do-jeon is a timid but bright boy who works part-time as a Pierrot because he genuinely loves making people laugh. Ban Ha-na is a girl that dreams of having her own food truck and developing a food truck app. The two coincidentally run into each other and slowly form a relationship over subsequent meetings. This is the story of their single-handed fight to prevent the closure of the "One Plus One" hobby club where they fell in love.

== Cast ==
- Kim Min-seok as Na Do-jeon
- Kim So-eun as Ban Ha-na
- Jang Hee-ryung as Ki Yeo-woon
- Jang Yoo-sang as Nam Gong-dae
- Park In-hwan as Landlord grandpa (Ep. 6)

== Original soundtracks ==
=== Falling For Challenge OST Part 1 ===
Track listing
No.	Title	Artist	Length
1.	"You Are The One"	Xiumin	3:17
2.	"You Are The One" (Instrumental)	Xiumin	3:17

=== Falling For Challenge OST Part 2 ===
Track listing
No.	Title	Artist	Length
1.	"시간이 흘러도 (Even After Time Passes)"	Song Ha-Ye	3:54
2.	"시간이 흘러도 (Even After Time Passes)" (Instrumental)	Song Ha-Ye	3:54

=== Falling For Challenge OST Part 3 ===
Track listing
No.	Title	Artist	Length
1.	"Loving U"	Road Boyz	2:53
2.	"Loving U" (Instrumental)	Road Boyz	2:53

=== Falling For Challenge OST Part 4 ===
Track listing
No.	Title	Artist	Length
1.	"하늘에 띄울까 (Write It In The Sky)"	Acoustic Vei	3:58
2.	"하늘에 띄울까 (Write It In The Sky)" (Instrumental)	Acoustic Vei	3:58

=== Falling For Challenge OST Part 5 ===
Track listing
No.	Title	Artist	Length
1.	"You Are My Everything" (Drama Version)	Espresso	3:53
2.	"You Are My Everything" (Instrumental)	Espresso	3:53

=== Chart performance ===
Title	Artist	Peak chart positions	Sales
Title	Artist	KOR Gaon	Sales
As featured artist
"You Are The One"	Xiumin	62	KOR: 26,196

== Awards and nominations ==
Year	Award	Category	Recipient	Result
2015	4th APAN Star Awards	Award for SNS Web Drama	Xiumin	Won
