= Lee Sae-on =

South Korean actor (born 1995)

- Born: Yoon Yong-bin; November 27, 1995 (age 30); Incheon, South Korea
- Other name: Yun Yeong-bin
- Education: Seokyeong University (Department of Music)
- Occupations: Actor; model; singer
- Years active: 2016–present
- Agent: Kenneth Company

Lee Sae-on (Korean: 이세온; born November 27, 1995) is a South Korean actor, singer and model. He is known for his roles in dramas such as Light on Me, Devil Inspector Season 2, CEO-dol Mart and Heo's Diner.

== Filmography ==
=== Television series ===
Year	Title	Role	Ref.
2018	Devil Inspector Season 2	Lee Myung-hoon	
2018	Dae Jang Geum Is Watching	Jeon Jin-ho	
2023	CEO-dol Mart	Yoon Sang-wu	
2025	Heo's Diner	Lee Yi-cheom / Lee Hyuk	

=== Web series ===
Year	Title	Role	Ref.
2019	Genome's Romance	Overnight Stay handsome guy	
2021	Light on Me	Woo Tae-kyung	
2021	Armored Saurus	Yong-hoo	
2021	Best Mistake Season 3	Woo Tae-kyung	
2022	Armored Saurus Season 2	Yong-ho	

=== Film ===
Year	Title	Role	Ref.
2023	Armored Saurus: Invasion of the Mechanical Dinosaur Empire	Yong-hoo	
