= Heo's Diner =

2025 South Korean television series

- Promotional poster
- Hangul: 허식당
- Hanja: 허食堂
- RR: Heo sikdang
- MR: Hŏ siktang
- Genre: Time slip; Fantasy; Romantic comedy
- Based on: Heo's Diner by Jeon Seon-yeong
- Written by: Sung So-hyun
- Directed by: Oh Hwan-min; Kim Kyung-eun
- Starring: Xiumin; Chu So-jung; Lee Sae-on; Lee Soo-min
- Music by: Jung Seung-hyun
- Country of origin: South Korea
- Original language: Korean
- No. of episodes: 10

Production
- Executive producers: Lee Min-suk; Kim Kyung-tae; Jang Woo-kyung (CP); Go Yoo-kyung (CP)
- Producers: Kwon Joon-suk; Park Hyung-won
- Cinematography: Cho Seung-ryong; Ji Jung-hoon
- Editor: Won Chang-jae
- Production company: The Great Show

Original release
- Network: Netflix; Wavve
- Release: March 24 – April 22, 2025

Heo's Diner (Korean: 허식당) is a 2025 South Korean time slip fantasy romantic comedy television series written by Sung So-hyun, co-directed by Oh Hwan-min and Kim Kyung-eun, and starring Xiumin, Chu So-jung, Lee Sae-on, and Lee Soo-min. Based on the web novel of the same name by Jeon Seon-yeong, it premiered on Netflix (Note: Currently available in South Korea) and Wavve on March 24, 2025, at 17:00 (KST) and also broadcast on MBN Plus at 21:00 (KST).

== Synopsis ==
Heo Gyun, a man from the Joseon period unexpectedly travels 400 years into the future and starts to open restaurant.

== Cast and characters ==
=== Main ===
- Xiumin as Heo Gyun

The first food columnist of the Joseon period who is a genius recognized by everyone.

- Chu So-jung as Bong Eun-sil

The daughter of owner of restaurant with no signboard who is a straightforward person that cannot tolerate injustice.

- Lee Sae-on as Lee Yi-cheom / Lee Hyuk
1. Lee Yi-cheom: a goal-oriented man who does not care about the means and methods to achieve what he wants.
2. Lee Hyuk: a graduate of one of the world's leading culinary schools and the youngest Korean food master.
- Lee Soo-min as Lee Mae-chang / Jung Mi-sol
1. Mae-chang: a beautiful lady and the temperament of an excellent entertainer.
2. Jung Mi-sol: a star who appeared as a child actress and has been in South Korean commercials.

=== Supporting ===
- Kim Hee-jung as Eun-sil's mother
- Oh Ji-ho as an assassin / Detective Kang
- Woo Hyun as No-ong

=== Special appearance ===
- Choi Won-myeong as King Gwanghae

== Production ==
In January 2024, Xiumin, Chu So-jung, Lee Sae-on, and Lee Soo-min were confirmed to star. Based on the web novel of the same name by Jeon Seon-yeong, the series is planned by Whynot Media, Hakuhodo DY Music & Pictures, and Copus Japan, (Note: A Tokyo-based subsidiary of Copus Korea.) with the former company's subsidiary The Great Show in charge of production. It is written by Sung So-hyun, and directed by Oh Hwan-min and Kim Kyung-eun.

== Release ==
Initially, the series was supposed to be released in 2024. In February 2025, it is confirmed to premiere on Netflix on March 24, 2025, releasing one episode every Monday and Tuesday at 17:00 (KST) and will also available to stream on Wavve. It will also be broadcast on MBN Plus at 21:00 (KST).
