= Choi Won-myeong =

South Korean actor (born 1994)

- Born: January 6, 1994 (age 32); South Korea
- Occupation: Actor
- Years active: 2014–present
- Agent: Lead
- Known for: Wok of Love; The Three Witches; Strong Girl Bong-soon

Choi Won-myeong (born January 6, 1994) is a South Korean actor. He is best known for his roles in dramas such as The Three Witches, Great First Wives, Wok of Love and Strong Girl Bong-soon.

== Filmography ==
=== Television series ===
Year	Title	Role	Ref.
2015	Great First Wives	Na Min-gyu	
2015	The Three Witches	Kang Hoon-nam	
2017	Strong Girl Bong-soon	Jang Kyung-tae	
2018	Wok of Love	Yang Kang-ho	
2021	Peng	Pi Jung-won	
2022	The Fabulous	Lee Nam-jin	
2023	Between Him and Her	Ahn Si-hoo	

=== Web series ===
Year	Title	Role	Note(s)	Ref.
2017	Between Friendship and Love 2	Nam Sa-rang		
2018	A-Teen	Choi Won-myung		
2023	CEO-dol Mart	Eun Young-min		
2025	Heo's Diner	King Gwanghae	Special appearance	

=== Television shows ===
Year	Title		Role	Notes	Ref.
Year	English	Korean	Role	Notes	Ref.
2015	Crime Scene 2	크라임씬 2	Assistant detective	Regular member	
2017	Modulove	모두의 연애	Cast member	Regular member	
2018	Music Bank	뮤직뱅크	Host	Episode: 933 - 985	

=== Music video appearances ===
Year	Title	Artist	Length	Ref.
2016	"You Call It Romance"	K.Will	03:49	
2017	"The Blue Night of Jeju Island"	Soyou	03:49	
2018	"Boredom"	Mind U	03:41	
2019	"Mom Arirang"	Song Ga-in	04:23	

== Theatre ==
Year	Title	Korean Title	Role	Ref.
2014	Bachelor's Vegetable Shop	총각네 야채가게	Vendor Saler	

== Awards and nominations ==
Name of the award ceremony, year presented, category, nominee of the award, and the result of the nomination
Award ceremony	Year	Category	Nominee / Work	Result	Ref.
KBS Entertainment Awards	2018	Best New Actor in Talk & Show	Music Bank	Won	
