= Im Jae-hyuk =

South Korean actor (born 1994)

- 임재혁
- Born: 6 May 1994 (age 32); Cheongju, South Korea
- Education: Korea National University of Arts
- Occupations: Actor; construction worker; delivery driver; courier
- Years active: 2020–present
- Agent: Ghost studio (2020–present)

Im Jae-hyuk (born 6 May 1994), also spelt Lim Jae-hyeok, is a South Korean part-time actor signed under Santa Claus Entertainment. He became well known for his portrayal of Yang Dae-su in South Korean Netflix series All of Us Are Dead.

== Personal life and career ==
Born on 6 May 1994, Im Jae-hyuk graduated from the Korea National University of Arts in 2016. While working as an actor, Im took three part-time jobs – a construction worker, a delivery driver, and a courier – to sustain his income. During his acting career, he has acted in movies, musicals and TV dramas, including an undisclosed role in 2020 SBS's drama serial Alice.

Im later appeared in Netflix's Korean web-drama All of Us Are Dead in 2022. He portrayed Yang Dae-su, an obese yet good-hearted student of Hyosan High School who aspires to be a singer. As preparation for his role, Im gained weight of 32 kg and he later lost 25 kg of it after the show finished filming. Im's portrayal of the character's funny scenes and his singing voice gained an increasing amount of attention from the netizens, in addition to the show's rising popularity.

When he appeared as a guest in You Quiz on the Block (hosted by Yoo Jae-suk and Jo Se-ho), Im Jae-hyuk revealed that despite his increasing popularity and Instagram followers (which rose to about 787,000), he still continues to work in five part-time jobs to supplement his income, as he still need to afford his rent and living expenses. He also expressed that he wanted to be financially independent after finishing his military service, so he kept his parents in the dark about his struggles and pretended to be doing well; Im's mother reportedly shed tears as she found out through the newspapers her son's part-time job experiences and financial difficulties.

Im enlisted and served in the Republic of Korea Marine Corps in 2013 after he failed his college entrance exams.

== Filmography ==
=== Film ===
Year	Title	Role	Notes	Ref.
2025	The Man From Seoburi	Eok-su		
2025	Once We Were Us	Oh Gyeong-seok		

=== Television series ===
Year	Title	Role	Ref.
2020	Alice	Unknown	
2022	Summer Strike	Dae-ho	
2023	Between Him and Her	Oh Min-hyuk	
2025	The Witch	Kim Joong-hyuk	
2026	Bloodhounds Season 2		
2026	Notes from the Last Row	Oh Jae-sik	

=== Web series ===
Year	Title	Role	Ref.
2022–present	All of Us Are Dead	Yang Dae-su	
2023	Daily Dose of Sunshine	Kong Cheol-woo	

== Awards and nominations ==
Name of the award ceremony, year presented, category, nominee of the award, and the result of the nomination
Award ceremony	Year	Category	Nominee / Work	Result	Ref.
Asia Artist Awards	2022	Icon Award – Actor	All of Us Are Dead	Won	
