= The Firstfruit =

2025 studio album by Mark

Studio album by Mark
- Released: April 7, 2025
- Length: 36:15
- Languages: English; Korean
- Labels: SM; Kakao
- Producers: Code Kunst; Dress; Pixelwave; Anders Gukko; Ebenezer Fabiyi; Tommy Brown; Pontus Kalm; Brian Mantra

Singles from The Firstfruit
- 1. "200" Released: May 16, 2024; 2. "Fraktsiya" Released: December 16, 2024; 3. "+82 Pressin'" Released: March 19, 2025; 4. "1999" Released: April 7, 2025

The Firstfruit is the debut studio album by Canadian rapper and singer Mark. It was released on April 7, 2025, by SM Entertainment through Kakao Entertainment.

== Release ==
On March 14, 2025, SM Entertainment confirmed that Mark would release his first studio album, titled The Firstfruit, on April 7. The first two singles, "200" and "Fraktsiya", were released in 2024, while "+82 Pressin'" and "1999" were released on March 19 and April 7, 2025, respectively.

== Track listing ==
| No. | Title | Lyrics | Music | Arrangement | Length |
|---|---|---|---|---|---|
| 1. | "Toronto's Window" | Mark (Note: Credited for the narration) | Code Kunst; Pick! | Code Kunst | 1:36 |
| 2. | "1999" | Mark; Dress; Samson | Mark; Dress; Samson; Sinjun; Paprikaa; Jonah Renna; Desmond Copeland (DCope) | Dress | 3:25 |
| 3. | "Flight to NYC" | Mark | Pixelwave | Pixelwave | 1:29 |
| 4. | "Righteous" | Mark; Dress; Samson; Raf Sandou; Jeffrey White; Mason Home | Mark; Dress; Samson; Copeland; Sandou; White; Home | Dress | 2:58 |
| 5. | "Fraktsiya" (프락치; featuring Lee Young-ji) | Mark; Lee; Ron; Jane; Dress; Sandou; White | Mark; Dress; Ron; Sandou; White | Dress | 3:12 |
| 6. | "Raincouver" | Mark (Note: Credited for the Korean lyrics) | Anders Gukko; Dewain Whitmore Jr.; Ebenezer Fabiyi; Tony Ferrari | Gukko; Fabiyi | 2:39 |
| 7. | "Loser" | Mark; Dress; Ron; Jane | Mark; Dress; Heon Seo | Dress | 2:50 |
| 8. | "Watching TV" (featuring Crush) | Mark; Dress; Ron; Jane | Mark; Dress; Ron; Sinjun; Copeland; Samson | Dress | 3:06 |
| 9. | "+82 Pressin'" (featuring Haechan) | Mark | Tommy Brown (TB Hits); Pontus Kalm (Oneye); Theron Thomas; Courtlin Jabrae Edwards; Andrew Choi | Tommy Brown; Kalm | 3:22 |
| 10. | "200" | Mark; Jane; Ron | Mark; Dress; Sion; Olmos; Dustin Brown | Dress | 2:44 |
| 11. | "Journey Mercies" | Mark; Brian Mantra | Mark; Mantra; Dress | Dress; Mantra | 3:45 |
| 12. | "Mom's Interlude" | | Mark; Kang Seung-hye | | 1:35 |
| 13. | "Too Much" | Mark; Samson; Dress | Mark; Dress; Samson | Dress | 3:34 |
| Total length: | | | | | 36:15 |

== Listicles ==
- Billboard ~ #1 Best K-Pop Album of 2025 (Staff Picks)
- Genius Korea ~ #1 Best K-Pop Album of 2025
- Forbes ~ One of the Notable/Critically Acclaimed K-Pop Albums of 2025
- Idology ~ One of the Top 20 Albums of the Year
- Screenrant ~ #3 Top 10 Best K-Pop album in 2025
- Headphonesty ~ One of the 50 Best Albums of 2025
- Omelete ~ One of the 10 Best K-pop Albums of 2025
- B-Side Rituals ~ #8 Best No Skip EPs/Albums of 2025
- YesAsia ~ #1 Best K-Pop Album of 2025

== Charts ==
=== Weekly charts ===
Weekly chart performance for The Firstfruit
| Chart (2025) | Peak position |
|---|---|
| Japanese Albums (Oricon) | 8 |
| Japanese Combined Albums (Oricon) | 8 |
| Japanese Hot Albums (Billboard Japan) | 43 |
| South Korean Albums (Circle) | 1 |

=== Monthly charts ===
Monthly chart performance for The Firstfruit
| Chart (2025) | Position |
|---|---|
| Japanese Albums (Oricon) | 18 |
| South Korean Albums (Circle) | 3 |

=== Year-end charts ===
Year-end chart performance for The Firstfruit
| Chart (2025) | Position |
|---|---|
| South Korean Albums (Circle) | 43 |

== Certifications and sales ==
Certifications and sales for The Firstfruit
| Region | Certification | Certified units/sales |
|---|---|---|
| Japan | — | 27,907 |
| South Korea (KMCA) | 2× Platinum | 582,192 |

== Release history ==
Releases for The Firstfruit
| Region | Date | Label(s) | Format(s) | Ref. |
|---|---|---|---|---|
| Various | April 7, 2025 | SM; Kakao | CD; digital download; streaming | |

== See also ==
- List of Circle Album Chart number ones of 2025
