= Child (Mark song) =

2022 single by Mark

Single by Mark
- Language: Korean; English
- Released: February 4, 2022
- Studio: SM Studios, Seoul, South Korea
- Genre: Hip hop
- Length: 3:31
- Label: SM; Dreamus
- Composers: Dress; Mark; Ron; Jane
- Lyricists: Mark; Ron; Jane

Mark singles chronology
"Dream Me" (2018)	"Child" (2022)	"Golden Hour" (2023)

Music video
- "Child" on YouTube

"Child" is a song recorded by Canadian rapper Mark. It was released with an accompanying music video on February 4, 2022, as a part of NCT Lab. The song was written by Mark, Ron and Jane, who were joined in the composition by Dress. "Child" was described as an emotional hip hop track that expresses candidly Mark's worries throughout the lyrics.

The song charted at number twenty-three on South Korea's Gaon Digital Chart. It also charted at number nine and twenty-five in Indonesia and Thailand respectively. In North America, "Child" peaked at number eight on the Billboard World Digital Songs chart, making it the singer's first entry on the chart.

== Background and release ==
On January 28, 2022, SM Entertainment announced that their digital music project, SM Station, would return with a special season, titled NCT Lab, and that Mark would start it off by releasing his first single under the project, "Child", on February 4. On January 31, three sets of teaser images were released on NCT's official social media. A teaser for the music video was shared the day before its release.

== Music and lyrics ==
"Child" was written by Mark, Ron and Jane, who were joined in the composition by Dress. Belle of Kiss of Life provided background vocals for the chorus. Musically, the song has been described as an emotional hip hop track that incorporates unique bass synth and electric guitar sound. Divyansha Dongre of Rolling Stone India categorized the track as a hip hop-rock release for its "strong sonic shift with the smooth insertion of bass synth" in the chorus. Lyrically, the song expresses the deep concerns of the singer about finding oneself.

== Chart performance ==
In South Korea, "Child" debuted at number 23 on the Gaon Digital Chart in the issue dated January 30–February 5, 2021. The song also debuted at number one on the component Download Chart. It also debuted at number six and 159 on the component BGM Chart and on the component Streaming Chart respectively. The song debuted at number 48 on the Billboard's K-pop Hot 100 chart in the issue dated February 19, 2022. In Japan, "Child" didn't enter the Billboard Japan Hot 100 chart, but debuted at number 53 on the component Top Download Songs chart. In Malaysia, the song debuted at position 17 on the RIM's Top 20 Chart. In Singapore, the song debuted at position 19 on the RIAS's Top Regional Chart in the issue dated February 4–10, 2021. In Indonesia, "Child" debuted at number nine on the Billboard's Indonesia Songs chart. In Thailand, the song debuted at position 25 on the Billboard's Thailand Songs chart. In Vietnam, the song debuted at position 50 on the Billboard Vietnam Hot 100 in the chart issue dated February 17, 2022. In the United States, "Child" debuted at number eight on the Billboard World Digital Song Sales chart in the issue dated February 19, 2022. It also at number 132 on the Billboard Global Excl. US chart in the issue dated February 19, 2022.

== Reception ==
Professional ratings
Review scores
Source	Rating
IZM	2.5/5 stars

"Child" received generally positive reviews. The song received attention for its "sensible" and "honest" lyrics that "yearn for freedom", with Hong Hye-min of the Hankook Ilbo noting how they follow an "essay-style", which is described by them as lyrics that "capture personal lyricism, contemplation, and reflection with a literary technique" and contain the singer's autobiographical story, an uncommon style in K-pop. The song features Mark's vocals alongside his "trademark" rap, which positively surprised the public. Lim Dong-yeop of IZM noted that, while the vocals are enhanced by the electric guitar, they tend to disappear when the rhythm section comes in. The song was selected by Vandana Pawa to be featured on Teen Vogue's list of the 79 best K-pop songs of 2022. "Child" won Top 20 Song of the Year (Overseas) at the 2022 Asian Pop Music Awards. (Note: Hosted by the Hong Kong Asia Pacific International Group and Sunway Records, the Asian Pop Music Awards bases its winners on the "Asian Pop Music Chart" which opened in September 2019.)

== Music video and live performance ==
The music video for "Child" was directed by Lee Hye-in. It features "gloomy visuals" and it is characterized by an "eclectic style". It begins with Mark lying in the middle of an abandoned factory. As the song starts to build up, Mark wakes up and, when the "rockier" chorus comes in, the singer takes off running while he's chased by a group of strangers. Regarding the fashion, Mark is shown wearing a "workwear-inspired layered look" at the start of the video, while in the next scenes he sports two other outfits: a plain white t-shirt paired with ripped jeans accompanied by a faux pierced eyebrow and a "glittering disco-ball" tracksuit covered in reflective tiles. During the chasing scene, the singer is also shown wearing a "brightly colored" rainbow overcoat and a backpack that leaves trails of red smoke behind him.

Mark performed the song for the first time on a music-dedicated segment of The NCT Show, a show featuring NCT members on NCT's official YouTube channel.

== Track listing ==
- Digital download and streaming
1. "Child" – 3:31
2. "Child" (instrumental) – 3:31

== Credits and personnel ==
Credits adapted from Melon.

Studio

- Recorded at SM Yellow Tail Studio
- Edited at SM Big Shot Studio
- Mixed at SM Blue Cup Studio
- Mastered at Boost Knob

Personnel

- Mark – vocals, lyrics, composition, background vocals
- Dress – composition, producer, vocal directing, drums, bass, piano, synthesizer
- Jane – lyrics, composition, vocal directing, background vocals
- Ron – lyrics, composition, vocal directing, background vocals
- Yoo Young-jin – music and sound supervisor
- Junny – background vocals
- Belle – background vocals
- Uh Yeon-ha – bass
- Kim Nok-cha – guitars
- No Min-ji – recording
- Lee Min-kyu – digital editing
- Jung Eui-seok – mixing
- Park Kyung-sun – mastering

== Charts ==
Weekly chart performance for "Child"
Chart (2022)	Peak position
Global Excl. US (Billboard)	132
Indonesia (Billboard)	9
Malaysia (RIM)	17
Singapore (RIAS Regional)	16
South Korea (Gaon)	23
South Korea (K-pop Hot 100)	48
Thailand (Billboard)	25
US World Digital Songs (Billboard)	8
Vietnam (Vietnam Hot 100)	50

== Release history ==
Release dates and formats for "Child"
Region	Date	Format	Label	Ref.
Various	February 4, 2022	Digital download; streaming	SM Entertainment; Dreamus	
