= Xiumin =

South Korean singer and actor (born 1990)

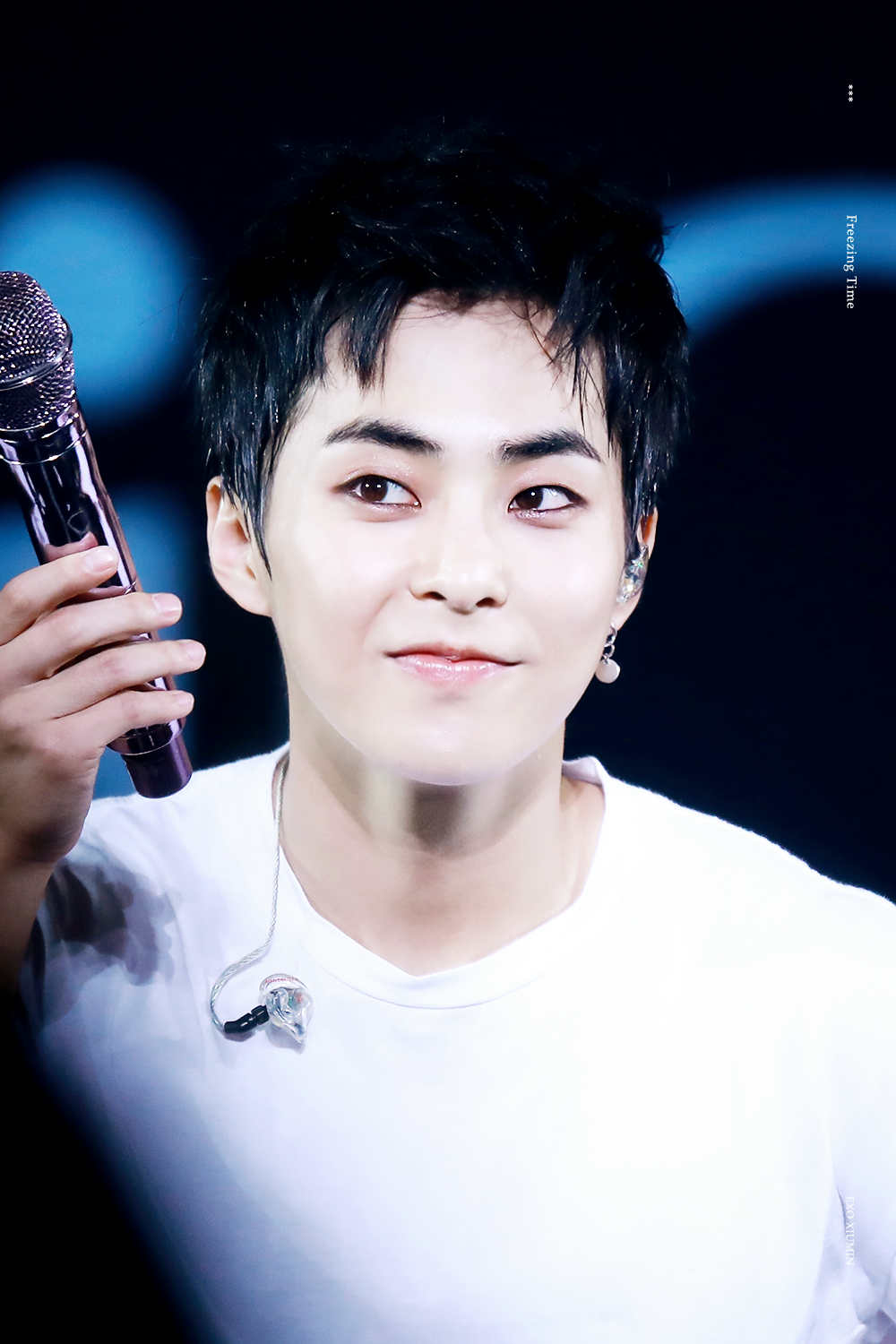
- Xiumin in August 2018
- Born: Kim Min-seok; March 26, 1990 (age 36); Seoul, South Korea
- Education: Catholic Kwandong University
- Occupations: Singer; actor
- Musical career
- Genres: K-pop; R&B
- Instrument: Vocals
- Years active: 2012–present
- Labels: SM; INB100
- Member of: Exo; Exo-M; Exo-CBX; SM Town
- Website: inb100.com/41

Korean name
- Hangul: 김민석
- Hanja: 金珉錫
- RR: Gim Minseok
- MR: Kim Minsŏk

Stage name
- Hangul: 시우민
- Hanja: 秀珉
- RR: Siumin
- MR: Siumin

Kim Min-seok (Korean: 김민석; born March 26, 1990), known professionally as Xiumin (시우민; pronounced [ɕʰi.u.min]), is a South Korean singer and actor. He is a member of the South Korean-Chinese boy band Exo, its sub-group Exo-M and leader of its sub-unit Exo-CBX. He debuted as a soloist on September 26, 2022, with the extended play (EP) Brand New.

== Name ==
His stage name is a combination of the Chinese reading of hanja characters 秀 (xiù), which means great or show, and 珉 (mín) which is part of his birth name.

== Life and career ==
=== 1990–2013: Early life and career beginnings ===
Xiumin was born on March 26, 1990, in Seongbuk-dong, Seongbuk-gu, Seoul and grew up in Guri, Gyeonggi Province. He was a student at Catholic Kwandong University where he attended a seminar and gave a presentation for students in Applied Music. Xiumin learned martial arts and has a black belt in Kendo and Taekwondo. He also trained in Wushu and Fencing. Xiumin is also known as an avid fan of football, and is an honorary ambassador of the Korea Football Association.

Before Xiumin's participation in SM's Everysing Contest, he had auditioned for JYP entertainment in 2008 but was rejected. In 2008, Xiumin won second place in the SM Everysing Contest. He later became a trainee through SM Entertainment's Casting System in the same year.

Xiumin was revealed as the seventh member of South Korean-Chinese boy group Exo in January 2012. The group debuted on April 8, 2012. In 2013, Xiumin made a guest appearance alongside actress Kim You-jung in the music video for the song "Gone" by South Korean singer Jin, now a member of Lovelyz.

=== 2015–2020: Acting roles and Exo-CBX ===
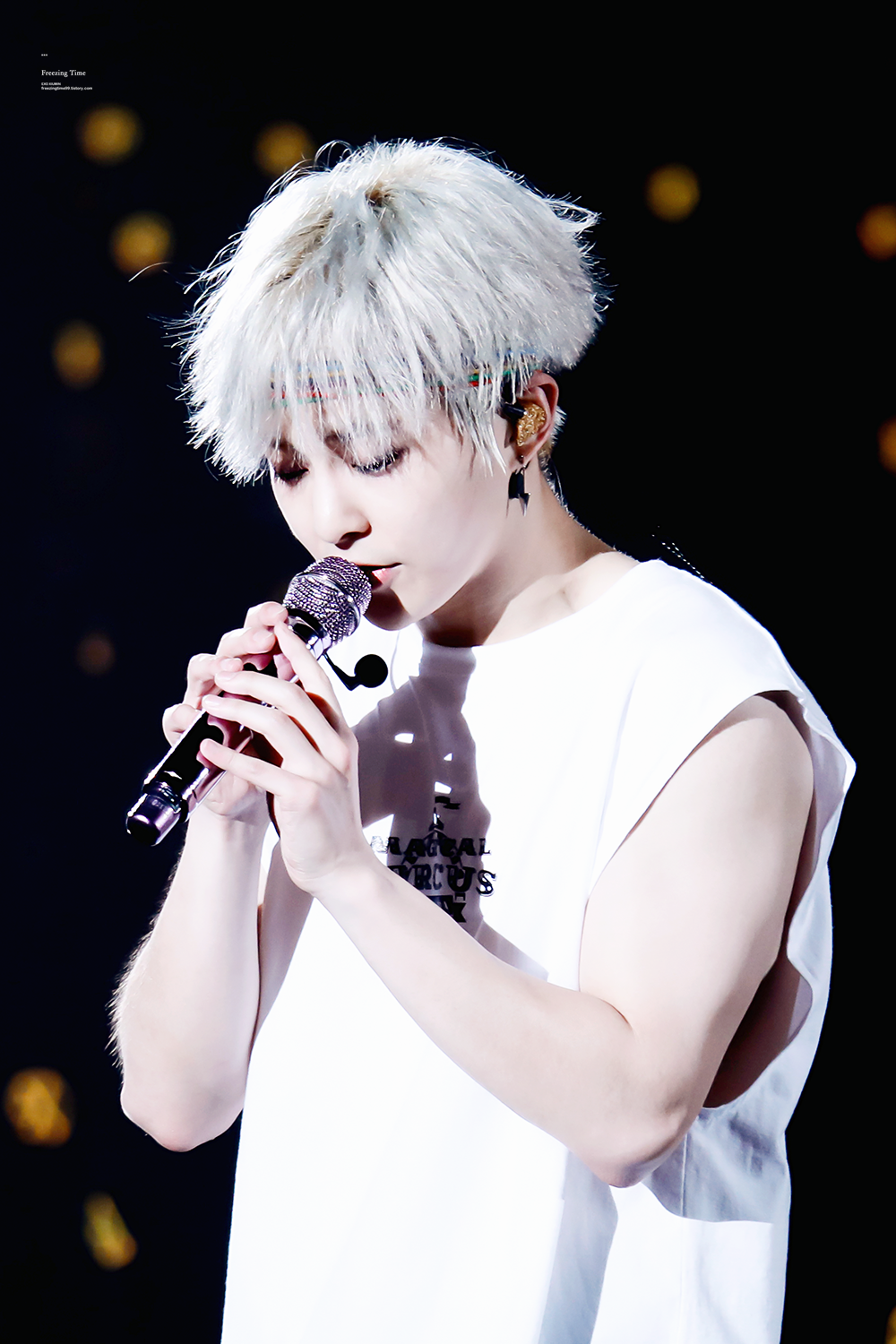
Xiumin at the Exo-CBX tour in Yokohama in May 2018

In January 2015, Xiumin made his musical theatre debut, playing the character of Aquila in the SM Entertainment musical School OZ alongside labelmates Changmin, Key, Luna, Suho, and Seulgi. In October 2015, Xiumin played the leading role opposite actress Kim So-eun in the web drama Falling for Challenge. He also released his first solo song since debut titled "You Are the One" as a soundtrack of the web drama. Falling for Challenge was the most watched web drama in South Korea in 2015, reaching 20 million views just after 17 days.

In February 2016, Xiumin was featured in AOA member Jimin's solo single "Call You Bae", and appeared in its music video. In July 2016, he made his big screen debut alongside Yoo Seung-ho in the South Korean film Seondal: The Man Who Sells the River. In August 2016, he collaborated with fellow Exo members Chen, and Baekhyun on an original soundtrack titled "For You" for the television series Moon Lovers: Scarlet Heart Ryeo. In October 2016, together with Chen and Baekhyun, Xiumin became a member of Exo's first official sub unit Exo-CBX. The group made their debut with the extended play Hey Mama! on October 31.

In July 2017, Xiumin collaborated with NCT member Mark on a single titled "Young & Free" for S.M. Entertainment's digital music project Station. In August, he became a regular cast member on the MBC reality TV show It's Dangerous Beyond The Blankets.

Xiumin enlisted for his mandatory military service on May 7, 2019, serving active duty. He performed his final concerts before his enlistment with Exo-CBX's Magical Circus - Special Edition concert in Japan, and his solo fan meeting concert, Xiuweet Time, at Jamsil Arena on May 4. Following his enlistment, he released his debut solo single, "You," which is part of SM Station, on May 9. In August 2019, it was reported that Xiumin would be starring in an army musical titled "Return: The Promise of That Day" together with Shinee member Onew and Yoon Ji-sung, which ran from October 22 to December 1 at the Olympic Park's Woori Art Hall in Seoul. Xiumin took his final military leave in November 2020, and did not return to the army due to the military's policy on COVID-19; he was discharged on December 6.

=== 2022–present: Solo debut, subsequent releases, contract dispute and INB100 ===
SM Entertainment confirmed that Xiumin would be the lead in a new drama, CEO-dol Mart in 2023.

On September 26, 2022, Xiumin released his debut EP, Brand New, alongside its lead single of the same name. Brand New is a retro K-pop record, which brings "nostalgic '90s sonic euphoria to listeners" according to The Korea Herald.

On April 5, 2023, it was confirmed that Xiumin and Eunha will have a collaboration song "Who?", which was released on April 9, 2023.

On June 1, 2023, it was announced that Xiumin, Chen and Baekhyun had ended their contracts with SM Entertainment on the grounds of overdue payment and unreasonable deals. On June 19, SM and the three members announced that both parties had resolved their differences over contract dispute and the members had decided to stay with the agency.

On September 20, 2023, it was announced that Xiumin participated for the soundtrack of CEO-dol Mart, titled "Daisy".

On January 8, 2024, Xiumin joined Baekhyun's label, INB100, to manage his solo activities with Exo activities to remain under SM Entertainment.

On March 10, 2025, Xiumin released his second EP, Interview X, alongside its lead single "Whee!". In addition, he would tour around Asia for his first fan concert titled "X Times ( )" in six various cities from March to May 2025.

On October 20, 2025, Xiumin released the digital singles "Overdrop" and "Fireflies" described as a "Pop Dance Title Track and R&B Companion" by The Chosun Ilbo.

== Discography ==
=== Extended plays ===
List of albums, showing selected details, selected chart positions, and sales figures
Title	Details	Peak chart positions			Sales
Title	Details	KOR	JPN	JPN Hot	Sales
Brand New	Released: September 26, 2022; Label: SM Entertainment, Dreamus; Formats: CD, digital download, streaming	2	6	7	KOR: 177,439; JPN: 7,389
Interview X	Released: March 10, 2025; Label: INB100; Formats: CD, digital download, streaming	8	—	—	KOR: 114,608

=== Singles ===
Title	Year	Peak chart positions		Sales	Album
Title	Year	KOR	US World	Sales	Album
As lead artist
"Breakin' Machine"	2014	—	—	—N/a	Exology Chapter 1: The Lost Planet
"Beyond"	2019	—	—	—N/a	Exo Planet 4 - The Elyxion (dot)
"You" (이유)	2019	68	—	—N/a	SM Station Season 3
"Brand New"	2022	— (Note: "Brand New" did not enter the Circle Digital Chart, but peaked at number 26 on the Circle Download Chart.)	—	—N/a	Brand New
"Whee!"	2025	— (Note: "Whee!" did not enter the Circle Digital Chart, but peaked at number 33 on the Circle Download Chart.)	—	—N/a	Interview X
"Overdrop"	2025	—	—	—N/a	Non-album single
As featured artist
"Call You Bae" (Jimin featuring Xiumin)	2016	5	5	KOR: 661,196	Non-album single
Collaborations
"Young & Free" (with Mark)	2017	31	6	KOR: 72,133	SM Station Season 2
"Who?" (with Eunha)	2023	—	—	—N/a	Non-album single
Soundtrack appearances
"You Are the One"	2015	62	—	KOR: 26,196	Falling for Challenge OST
"For You" (with Baekhyun and Chen)	2016	5	9	KOR: 625,756	Moon Lovers: Scarlet Heart Ryeo OST
"To My One and Only You" (나의 유일한 너에게)	2021	81	—	—N/a	Mr. Queen OST
"Daisy"	2023	—	—	—N/a	CEO-dol Mart OST
"—" denotes releases that did not chart or were not released in that region.

== Filmography ==
=== Film ===
Year	Title	Role	Ref.
2016	Seondal: The Man Who Sells the River	Gyeon	

=== Web series ===
Year	Title	Role	Ref.
2015	Exo Next Door	Xiumin	
2015	Falling for Challenge	Na Do-jeon	
2023	CEO-dol Mart	Shin Tae-ho	
2025	Heo's Diner	Heo Gyun	

=== Television shows ===
Year	Title	Role	Notes	Ref.
2016	Travel without Manager	Main cast	Episodes 1–8	
2017–2018	It's Dangerous Beyond The Blankets	Main cast	Ep. 1–3 (Season 1), Ep. 6–7 (Season 2)	
2021	Drink With God	Host	Episodes 3–12	
2021	Drink With God Season 2	Host	Episodes 1–10	
2021	Xiumin's Tennis King Tomorrow	Main cast	with Jeon Mi-ra	
2024	Make Mate 1	Host		
2024–2025	Mr. Trot	Master	Season 3	

=== Web shows ===
Year	Title	Role	Notes	Ref.
2019	Heart4U/Sim For You – Xiumin Arc	Host	Episodes 1-18	
2022	Brand New Acorn Market	Host		

=== Radio shows ===
Year	Date	Title	Role	Ref.
2013	July 13	SJ Shindong's Shim Shim Ta Pa (Stop the Boring Time)	Special DJ	
2013	November 8	SJ Shindong's Shim Shim Ta Pa (Stop the Boring Time)	Special DJ	
2015	January 29	Super Junior's Kiss The Radio	Special DJ	

=== Documentaries ===
Year	Title	Notes	Ref.
2017	Korea from Above	Narration with Suho	

== Videography ==
=== Music videos ===
Year	Title	Ref.
2015	"You Are the One"	
2016	"Call You Bae" (Jimin feat. Xiumin)	
2017	"Young & Free" (with Mark (NCT))	
2018	"Beyond" (with Beatburger Project)	
2019	"You" (이유)	
2022	"Brand New"	
Guest appearances
2013	"Gone" (Jin (Lovelyz))	
2014	"A Glass of Soju" (소주 한 잔) (remake; Im Chang-jung)	

== Theater ==
Year	Title	Role	Notes	Ref.
2015	School OZ	Aquila	Holographic musical	
2019	Return: The Promise of That Day	Kim Seung-ho	Army musical	
2020	Return	Hyun-min	Army musical	
2021–2022	Hadestown	Orpheus		

== Fanmeetings ==
Event	Date	Country	Location	Ref.
Xiuweet Time	May 4, 2019	Seoul, South Korea	Jamsil Indoor Gymnasium	
On: Xiuweet Time	March 27, 2021	Online		

== Ambassadorship ==
Year	Title	Ref.
2014	Gangnam City Ambassador	
2014	Honorary Member of Korea Football Association (KFA)	

== Awards and nominations ==
Name of the award ceremony, year presented, category, nominee of the award, and the result of the nomination
Award ceremony	Year	Category	Nominee / Work	Result	Ref.
APAN Star Awards	2015	SNS Web Drama Award	Falling for Challenge	Won	
Circle Chart Music Awards	2023	Mubeat Global Choice Awards (Male)	Xiumin	Nominated	
Click! StarWars Awards	2017	Most Popular Singer	Xiumin	Won	
Korea First Brand Awards	2023	Best Male Solo Singer	Xiumin	Won	
