= Young & Free (Xiumin and Mark song) =

Single by Xiumin and Mark
- Released: July 7, 2017
- Recorded: 2017
- Studio: Doobdoob (Seoul); SM LVYIN (Seoul)
- Genre: Future bass
- Length: 3:22
- Label: SM; Genie
- Composers: Andreas Öberg; Drew Ryan Scott; Willie Weeks
- Lyricists: Jo Yoon-kyung; Mark
- Producer: Willie Weeks

Music video
- "Young & Free" on YouTube

"Young & Free" is a single recorded by South Korean singer Xiumin and Canadian rapper Mark, members of K-pop groups EXO and NCT respectively. It was released by SM Entertainment and distributed by Genie Music on July 7, 2017 through their digital music project SM Station.

"Young & Free" is an upbeat and lively song that harmonizes Xiumin's vocals with Mark's rap. Xiumin and Mark advised young people to go wherever they desire. They encouraged them to set out with a light heart and leave behind endless worries. The song felt like a cheer for the youth who have lost their way, urging them to stay strong.

== Background and release ==
On June 28, SM Entertainment announced that Xiumin and Mark will collaborate for an SM Station track "Young & Free" set to be released on July 7. The agency also released a video clip of the two introducing their track "Young & Free" on their official Twitter page. On June 30, SM stated that the duo would be performing the song live during the SMTOWN concert that is set to take place on July 8. On the same day, teaser photos of the duo were released through SM's official Twitter page. One July 5, an interview video of the duo talking about their collaboration and their friendship was released. A teaser of the music video was released on July 6. On July 7, the song along with the official music video were released.

Produced by Willie Weeks, "Young & Free" is described as a 90's vibe song featuring retro piano tunes and future-bass sounds, "Young & Free" is altogether a lively tune that features Xiumin's singing and Mark's rapping. The song's lyrics talk about how to live in the moment.

== Music video ==
Released on July 7, the music video of "Young & Free" features Xiumin and Mark at what appears as a photographic studio playing around and dancing "freely". At the end of the music video the duo end up in a real forest.

== Track listing ==
No.	Title	Lyrics	Music	Arrangement	Length
1.	"Young & Free"	Jo Yoon-kyung; Mark	Andreas Öberg; Drew Ryan Scott; Willie Weeks	Willie Weeks	03:22
2.	"Young & Free" (Inst.)		Andreas Öberg; Drew Ryan Scott; Willie Weeks	Willie Weeks	03:22
Total length:					06:44

== Charts ==
=== Weekly charts ===
Chart (2017)	Peak position
South Korea (Gaon)	31
US World Digital Songs (Billboard)	6

=== Monthly charts ===
Chart (2017)	Peak position
South Korea (Gaon)	94

== Sales ==
Region	Sales
South Korea (Gaon)	72,133

== Release history ==
Release history for "Young & Free"
Region	Date	Format	Label
Various	July 7, 2017	Digital download; streaming	SM; Genie
