= Mark Lee (singer) =

Canadian singer and rapper (born 1999)

- Lee in 2026
- Born: August 2, 1999 (age 27); Toronto, Ontario, Canada
- Occupations: Singer; rapper; songwriter
- Years active: 2013–present
- Musical career
- Origin: Seoul, South Korea
- Genres: K-pop; hip hop
- Instrument: Vocals
- Labels: SM; Upper Room
- Formerly of: NCT; NCT 127; NCT Dream; SuperM; SM Rookies

Korean name
- Hangul: 이민형
- RR: I Minhyeong
- MR: I Minhyŏng

Mark Lee (born August 2, 1999), also known mononymously as Mark (Korean: 마크), is a Canadian singer and rapper. He is a former member of the South Korean boy band NCT and its fixed sub-units NCT 127 and NCT Dream, as well as the supergroup SuperM. Mark made his solo debut on April 7, 2025, with his first studio album The Firstfruit. On April 3, 2026, Mark departed from NCT and SM Entertainment following the expiration of his contract on April 8. On June 3, he announced his new label, Upper Room.

== Career ==
=== 2012–2016: Pre-debut ===
In 2012, Mark joined SM Entertainment as a trainee after passing the SM Global Audition in Vancouver, Canada. On December 16, 2013, he was introduced as a member of SM Rookies, a pre-debut team of trainees under SM Entertainment. As a part of the SM Rookies program, in October 2014, he and several of his co-members appeared on the Mnet-produced Exo 90:2014, a show starring labelmates Exo – where they perform dances to K-pop songs from the 1990s.

In 2015, Mark and other SM Rookies members starred as Mouseketeers in a Korean revival of The Mickey Mouse Club, which aired on Disney Channel Korea. The show included musical performances, games, and skits, similar to the original American show. It aired from July 23 to December 17, 2015, hosted by Leeteuk of Super Junior.

=== 2016–2018: NCT and solo endeavours ===
In April 2016, SM Entertainment confirmed that Mark and four other members of SM Rookies—Taeyong, Doyoung, Ten and Jaehyun—would debut as members of NCT's first sub-unit, NCT U. They released their first digital single on April 9, titled "The 7th Sense", in which he and Taeyong participated in songwriting. Three months later, SM Entertainment announced that Mark would become a member of NCT's second sub-unit, NCT 127, along with Taeyong, Taeil, Yuta, Jaehyun, Winwin and Haechan. NCT 127 made their official debut with the extended play NCT #127 and title track "Fire Truck" on July 10, 2016.

Mark also joined NCT's third sub-unit, NCT Dream, which consisted of members Renjun, Jeno, Haechan, Jaemin, Chenle and Jisung. The group officially debuted on August 24, 2016, with the single "Chewing Gum". The following month, Mark featured on Henry Lau's "Going Through Your Heart", an original soundtrack for the KBS drama, Sweet Stranger and Me. This marked his first solo endeavour since his debut in NCT.

In January 2017, Mark joined High School Rapper, a survival hip hop reality TV show that aired on Mnet. He advanced to the finals and performed an original song, "Drop" featuring labelmate Seulgi of Red Velvet, and placed seventh overall. In July 2017, Mark collaborated with Exo's Xiumin on single "Young & Free". It was released through Season 2 of SM Entertainment's digital music project SM Station. The same month, Mark appeared in the first season of the music variety show Snowball Project. He teamed up with Parc Jae-jung to release "Lemonade Love" on July 21, also through SM Station, which was produced by former labelmate, Henry Lau and Yoon Jong-shin.

Beginning in February 2018, Mark served as one of the main hosts of the music program Show! Music Core, leaving in January 2019 to focus on his activities with NCT 127. In May 2018, he became a regular cast member on the MBC reality TV show It's Dangerous Beyond The Blankets. In October 2018, Mark released the song "Dream Me" with Red Velvet's Joy for the soundtrack of the KBS drama The Ghost Detective. Mark was the first member to officially graduate from NCT Dream on December 31, 2018.

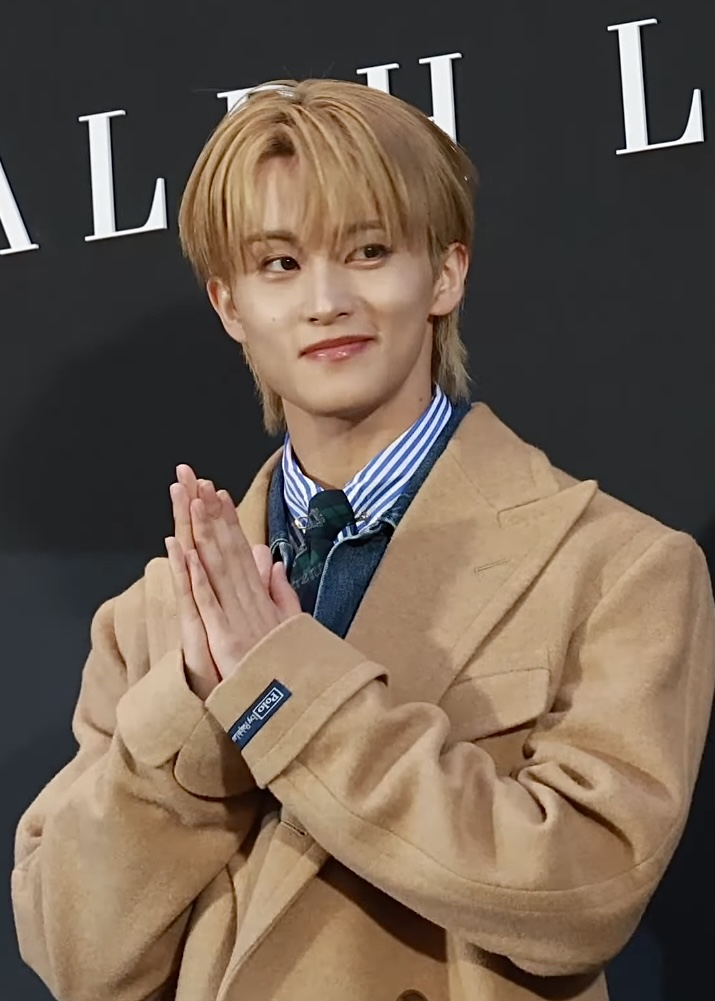
Mark in 2024

=== 2019–2026: SuperM, rejoining NCT Dream, and departure from NCT ===
On August 7, 2019, Mark was confirmed as a member of SuperM – a supergroup created by SM Entertainment in collaboration with Capitol Records. The group began promoting in October of that year in the American music market. SuperM's self-titled debut EP was released on October 4, 2019, led by the single "Jopping". Mark continued to promote with SuperM throughout 2020, through the release the group's first studio album, Super One. On April 14, SM Entertainment announced through an official statement that Mark would be rejoining NCT Dream, thus abolishing their original age-based graduation system. His return was affirmed through his participation in the NCT Dream song "Déjà Vu" on the group-wide studio album NCT 2020 Resonance.

On January 28, 2022, it was announced that Mark would release his first single, "Child". Specifically, it was set to be released on February 4, as part of NCT Lab. "Child", described as an emotional hip-hop track, was commended for its lyrics.

On March 30, 2023, it was announced that Mark would release his new solo song and second single, "Golden Hour", on April 7, as part of NCT Lab. "Golden Hour" described as a hip-hop genre song that combines impactful guitar and drum sounds and flashy rapping and also a self-produced song. The song featured lyrics referencing a highly memed Twitter review from the celebrity chef Gordon Ramsay for fried eggs he made on It's Dangerous Beyond the Blanket.

On May 16, 2024, Mark announced the start of his solo album, set to be released in February 2025, with a digital single titled "200". The new song "200" is a drum & bass track with rock sounds, featuring a captivating blend of early 2000s electric guitar sounds and lyrical melodies. The lyrics convey the meaning of love, describing how two people make each other shine brighter and how their relationship becomes more perfect when they are together.

On December 11, 2024, it was confirmed that Mark would release his new single, "Fraktsiya", featuring Lee Young-ji, along with a music video. The single "Fraktsiya" is a hip-hop track defined by its powerful 808 bass and highly repetitive synthesizer sounds over a house-style chord progression. "Fraktsiya", which means "spy" in Russian, is referenced in the lyrics to describe Mark and Lee's experiences navigating between K-pop and hip-hop. The comparison highlights their ability to move between the two genres like "spies", showcasing their confidence and skill in delivering impressive performances across both fields. Subsequently, the release of his solo album, originally scheduled for February 2025, was postponed to April 2025, with SM Entertainment stating that the delay was to 'ensure better quality'.

Mark's debut studio album, The Firstfruit, was released on April 7, 2025. The album featured the lead single titled "1999".

On April 8, 2026, Mark concluded his contract with SM Entertainment, exactly ten years after his debut. The agency stated that the decision followed an "extensive conversations" regarding his future path, and includes his departure from all NCT sub-units, including NCT 127 and NCT Dream.

=== 2026–present: Upper Room, UNEP attendance, and T-shirt incident ===
On June 3, Mark announced via Instagram the creation of his new label, Upper Room following his departure from his former label, SM Entertainment, and groups such as NCT U and NCT 127.

At the official United Nations Environment Programme observance of World Environment Day on June 5 in Baku, Azerbaijan, Mark performed an unreleased acoustic song inspired by Kenya's Maasai Mara National Reserve, following a visit to the country and UNEP headquarters earlier in the year.

On June 23, Mark drew controversy after photos were posted showing him at a post-content filming wearing a T-shirt displaying the Confederate battle flag, a symbol historically associated with the Confederate States of America and widely regarded as representing racism and the Defense of Slavery. Following public backlash, the photos were deleted. A few hours after the photos were uploaded, Upper Room issued a public apology. On August 24, Mark issued his own apology.

== Personal life ==
Mark is a Christian. As of 2026, he is living in New York, United States.

== Other ventures ==
=== Endorsements ===
In October 2022, Polo Ralph Lauren selected Mark as the Korean ambassador of the brand.

In February 2025, Mark was selected to be an ambassador of cosmetics brand Espoir. In March, French high jewelry maison Boucheron welcomed Mark as a Friend of the Maison. In April, Mark was announced as a brand ambassador of Tim Hortons Korea. In October, Mark was announced as the new brand model of the skincare brand COSRX.

=== Philanthropy ===
In February 2023, Mark donated ₩150 million to the Hope Bridge National Disaster Relief Association to help victims of the 2023 Turkey–Syria earthquake and ₩10 million to the Community Chest of Korea along with Genie Music.

In March 2025, Mark donated ₩100 million to the Hope Bridge National Disaster Relief Association to help aid the recovery of areas affected by wildfires in the Ulsan, Gyeongbuk, and Gyeongnam regions. Also, to celebrate the release of his debut solo album in April, Mark also made a meaningful donation of ₩100 million (approx. $76,000) to support children living in protective care facilities, expanding emotional and social outreach programs for those in need.

== Discography ==
- The Firstfruit (2025)

== Filmography ==
=== Television shows ===
| Year | Title | Role | Notes | Ref. |
|---|---|---|---|---|
| 2017 | High School Rapper | Contestant | | |
| 2017 | Snowball Project | Cast member | | |
| 2018 | Show! Music Core | Co-host | | |
| 2018 | It's Dangerous Beyond The Blankets | Cast member | Ep. 8–10 (Season 2) | |

=== Music videos ===
| Title | Year | Director(s) | Ref. |
|---|---|---|---|
| "Young & Free" (with Xiumin) | 2017 | Unknown | —N/a |
| "Lemonade Love" (with Parc Jae-jung) | 2017 | Shindong | |
| "Child" | 2022 | Unknown | —N/a |
| "Golden Hour" | 2023 | Eehosoo (cpbeq) | |
| "200" | 2024 | Eehosoo (cpbeq) | |
| "Fraktsiya (feat. Lee Young-ji) | 2024 | Giseong Jun (ES4X) | |
| "+82 Pressin'" (feat. Haechan) | 2025 | Cheol-ho Park | |
| "1999" | 2025 | Vin Kim (Kepler Lab) | |
| "My Friend" | 2026 | Gus Black | |

== Awards and nominations ==
Name of the award ceremony, year presented, award category, nominee(s) of the award, and the result of the nomination
| Award ceremony | Year | Category | Nominee / Work | Result | Ref. |
|---|---|---|---|---|---|
| Asian Pop Music Awards | 2022 | Top 20 Songs of the Year (Overseas) | "Child" | Won | |
| Asian Pop Music Awards | 2025 | Top 20 Albums of the Year | The Firstfruit | Won | |
| Asian Pop Music Awards | 2025 | Best Collaboration | "Fraktsiya" (feat. Lee Young-ji) | Nominated | |
| Asian Pop Music Awards | 2025 | Best Male Artist | Mark | Nominated | |
| Korea Grand Music Awards | 2025 | Best Music 10 | The Firstfruit | Won | |
| Korean Music Awards | 2026 | Best K-Pop Album | The Firstfruit | Nominated | |
| MAMA Awards | 2025 | Artist of the Year | Mark | Nominated | |
| MAMA Awards | 2025 | Song of the Year | "1999" | Nominated | |
| MAMA Awards | 2025 | Song of the Year | "Fraktsiya" (feat. Lee Young-ji) | Nominated | |
| MAMA Awards | 2025 | Best Male Artist | Mark | Nominated | |
| MAMA Awards | 2025 | Best Dance Performance Male Solo | "1999" | Nominated | |
| MAMA Awards | 2025 | Best Collaboration | "Fraktsiya" (feat. Lee Young-ji) | Nominated | |
| MBC Entertainment Awards | 2018 | Rookie Award in Music / Talk Show – Male | Show! Music Core | Nominated | |
| Melon Music Awards | 2025 | Millions Top 10 | The Firstfruit | Nominated | |
| Music Awards Japan | 2026 | Best K-Pop Artist | Mark | Longlisted | |
