= 2013 Melon Music Awards =

2013 South Korean music award ceremony

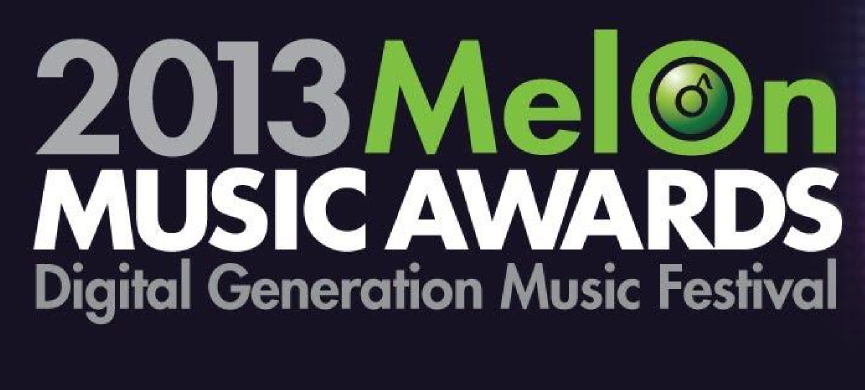
- Date: Thursday, November 14, 2013
- Location: Olympic Gymnastics Arena
- Country: South Korea

Highlights
- Most awards: Exo (3)
- Most nominations: Exo (5)
- Artist of the Year: Shinee
- Song of the Year: "Growl"
- Album of the Year: Busker Busker 2nd Album
- Website: Melon Music Awards website

Television/radio coverage
- Network: JTBC2; JTBC4; 1theK; KakaoTV; Daum; Melon

The 2013 Melon Music Awards were held on Thursday, November 14, 2013, at the Olympic Gymnastics Arena in Seoul, South Korea. Organized by Kakao M through its online music store Melon, the 2013 ceremony was the fifth edition of the event since its offline launch in 2009.

== Performers ==
List of performances at 2013 Melon Music Awards
Artist(s)	Song(s)
Rose Motel	"Please Call Me Oppa"
Sistar	"Gone Not Around Any Longer" / "Give It To Me"
Baechigi, Ailee	"Shower of Tears"
BTS	"No More Dream"
BTS; Baechigi	"The Rise Of Bangtan" / "Nice To Meet You"
Lim Kim	"Short Hair" (Cho Yong-pil cover)
Huh Gak	"Standing in the Shade Of Trees" (Lee Moon-sae cover)
Ailee; Shin Seung-hun	"Romeo & Juliet" (Shin Seung-hun cover)
Lim Kim; Huh Gak; Ailee; Shin Seung–hun	"My Melody"
Exo	"Wolf" / "Growl"
Dynamic Duo	"Baaam"
IU	"The Red Shoes"
Beast	"Shadow"
Shinee	"Lucifer" (Onew) / "Ring Ding Dong" (Minho) / "Juliette" (Key) / "Sherlock" (Taemin) / "Dream Girl" (Jonghyun) / "Why So Serious?" (covered by Exo) / "Everybody"

== Winners and nominees ==
=== Main awards ===
Winners and nominees are listed below. Winners are listed first and emphasized in bold.

Top 10 Artists (Bonsang)	Album of the Year (Daesang)
**Exo**; **Shinee**; **G-Dragon**; **Beast**; **Sistar**; **IU**; **Ailee**; **Dynamic Duo**; **Davichi**; **Busker Busker**	**Busker Busker – Busker Busker 2nd Album**; Shinee – The Misconceptions of Us; IU – Modern Times; Exo – XOXO; G-Dragon – Coup d'Etat
Artist of the Year (Daesang)	Song of the Year (Daesang)
**Shinee**; Sistar; IU; Exo; G-Dragon	**Exo – "Growl"**; Busker Busker – "Love, At First"; Beast – "Shadow"; IU – "The Red Shoes"; G-Dragon – "Who You?"
Best New Artist	Best Pop Award
**BTS**; **Lim Kim**; Roy Kim; Ladies' Code; History	**Bruno Mars – "Young Girls"**
Best Rap/Hip Hop Award	Best Rock Award
**Baechigi – "Shower of Tears" ft. Ailee**; Geeks – "Was Away"; Leessang – "Tears"; San E – "Story of Someone I Know"; Verbal Jint – "If It Ain't Love"	**Cho Yong-pil – "Bounce"**; CNBLUE – "I'm Sorry"; Kang Seung-yoon – "It Rains"; Younha – "The Real Reason We Broke Up"; Yoo Seung-woo – "Hello"
Best R&B/Ballad Award	Best OST Award
**Huh Gak – "Monodrama"**; **K.Will – "You Don't Know Love"**; Bumkey – "Bad Girl"; Lyn – "Tonight"; Lee Seung-chul – "The Day to Love"	**Yoon Mi-rae – "Touch Love" (Master's Sun)**; 4Men – "Only You" (Gu Family Book); AKMU – "I Love You" (All About My Romance); Gummy – "Snowflake" (That Winter, the Wind Blows); Kim Bo-kyung – "Don't Think You Are Alone" (School 2013)
Netizen Popularity Award	Hot Trend Award
**Exo** **– "Growl"**; Beast – "Shadow"; G-Dragon – "Who You?"; Girls' Generation – "I Got a Boy"; Lee Hyori – "Bad Girls"; Sistar – "Give It to Me"; Shinee – "Dream Girl"; Roy Kim – "Spring Spring Spring"	**Crayon Pop – "Bar Bar Bar"**; **Rose Motel – "Longtime Lovers"**; Hyungdon and Daejun – "What I Want From a Man"; Psy – "Gentleman"; UV – "Because of You"

=== Other awards ===
Nominees	Winners
Music Video Award	Lee Gi-baek – Beast's "Shadow"
Global Artist Award	Psy
MBC Music Star Award	f(x)
Songwriter Award	Shinsadong Tiger

== Gallery ==
2013 Melon Music Awards gallery
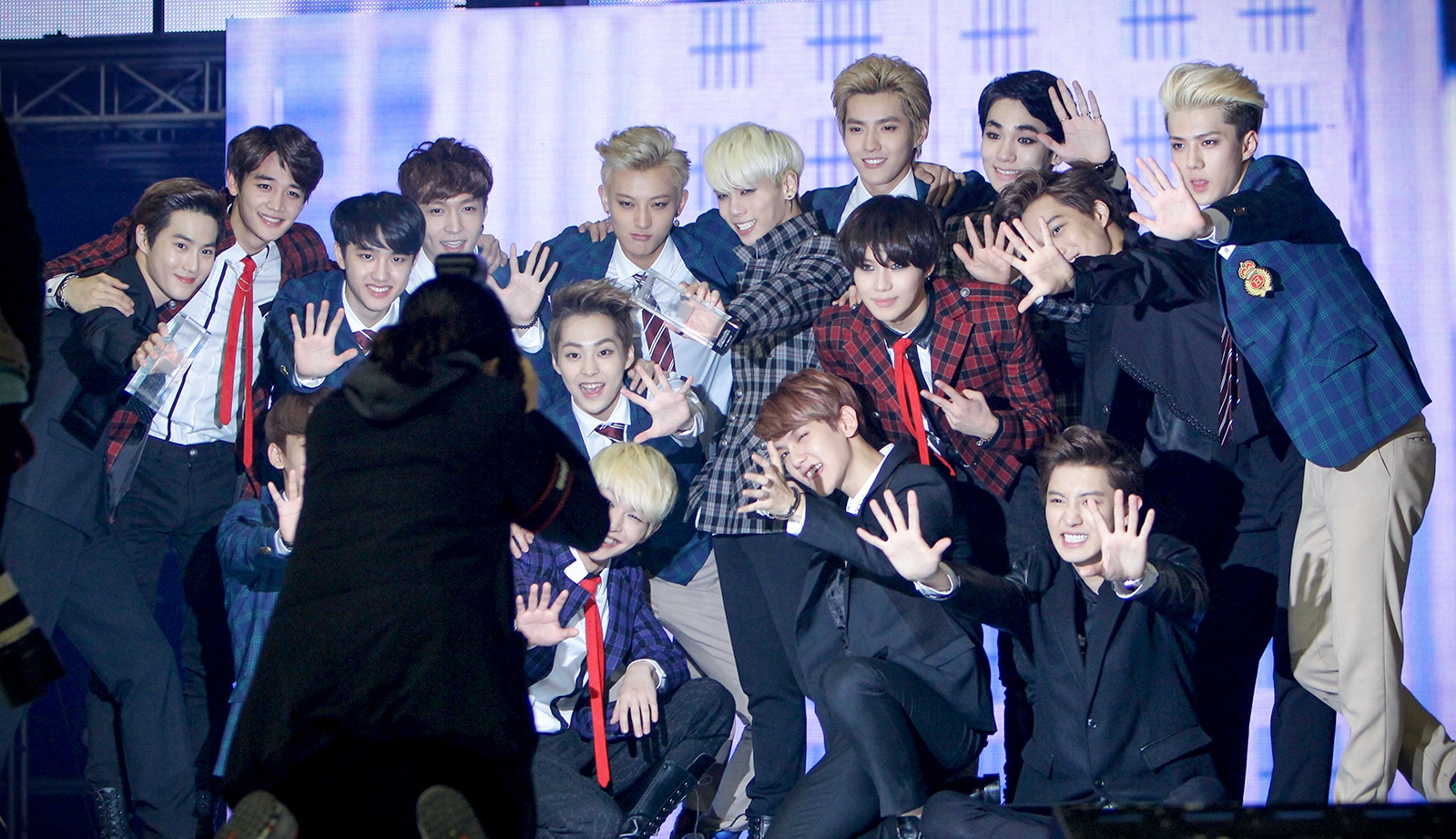
Shinee and Exo

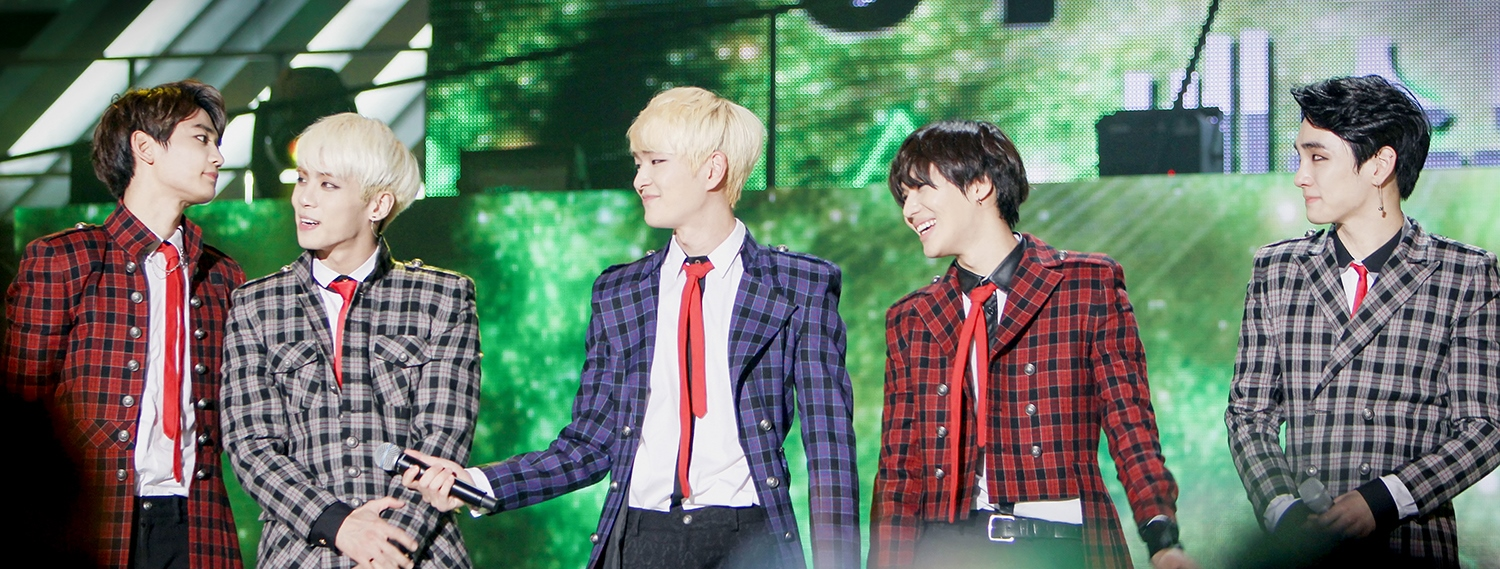
Shinee after winning Artist of the Year

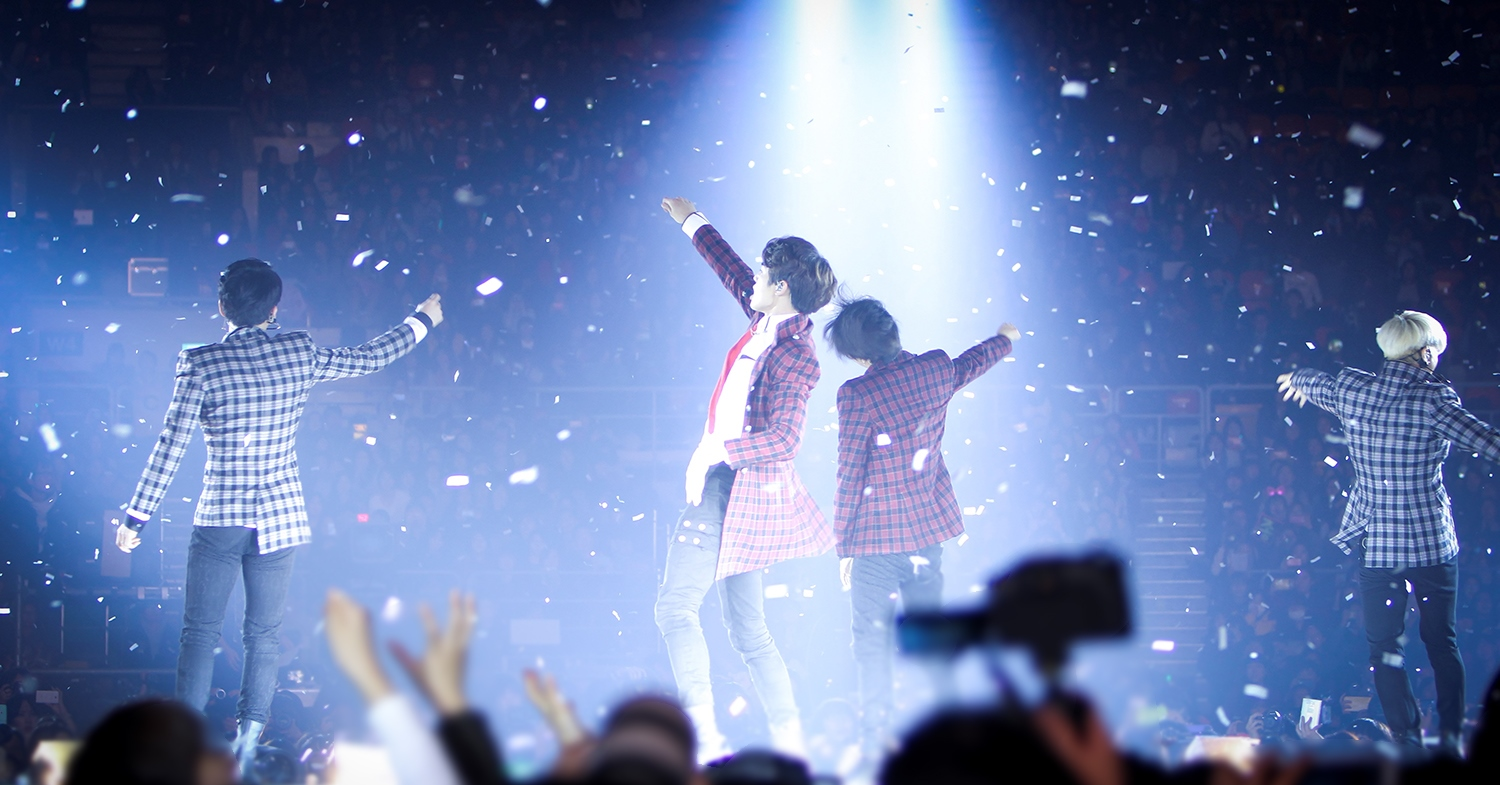
Shinee performing

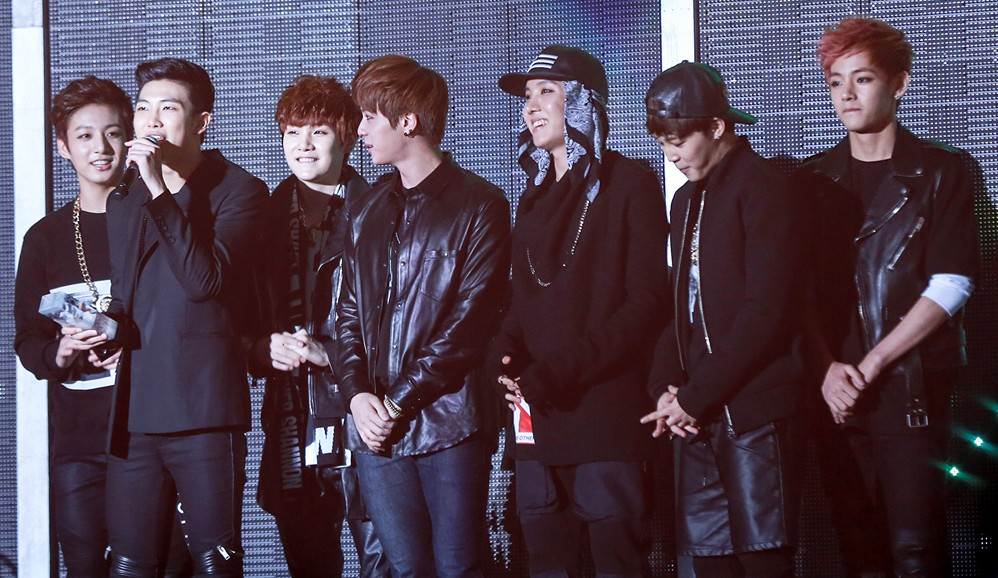
BTS after winning Best New Male Artist

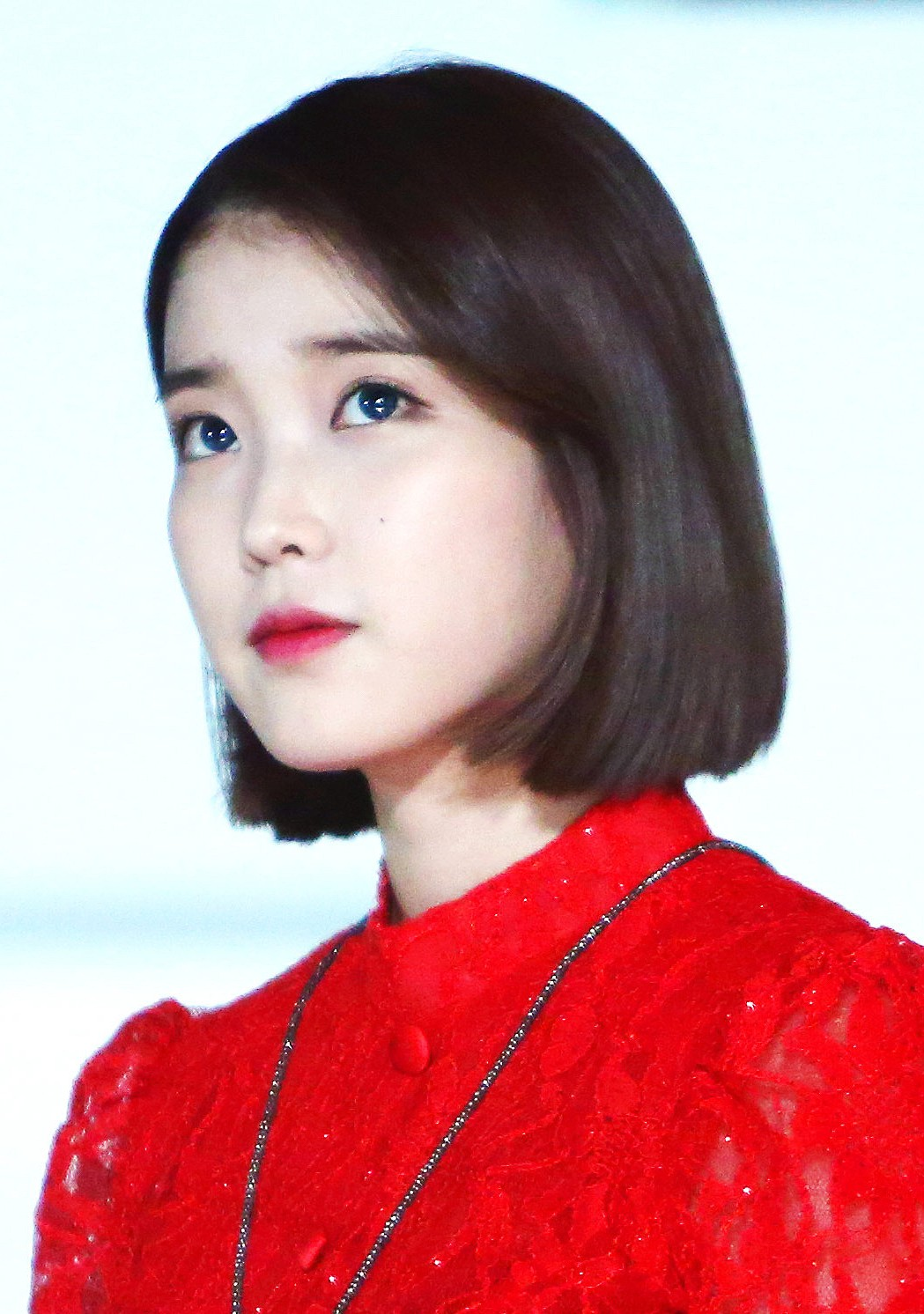
IU

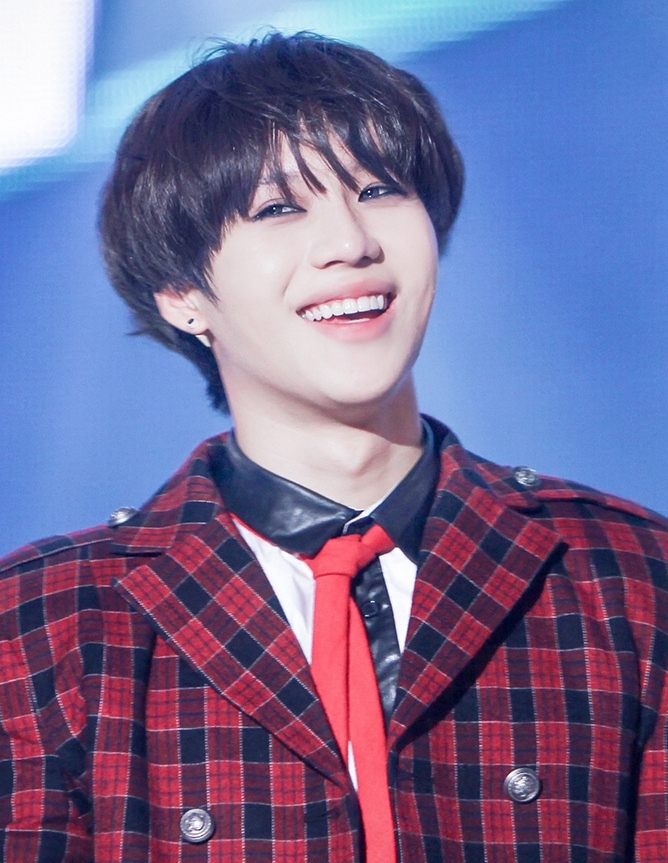
Shinee's Taemin

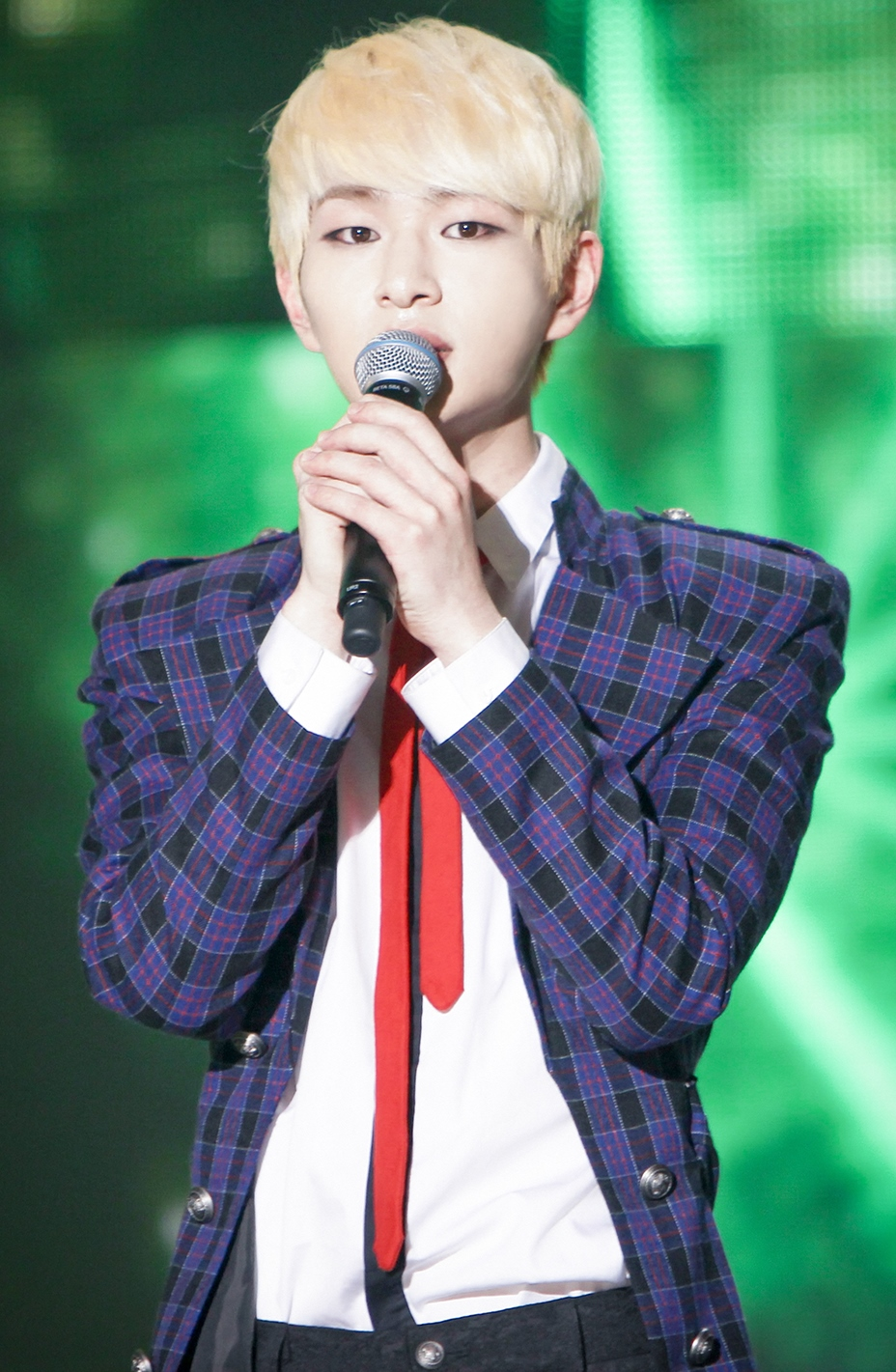
Shinee's Onew

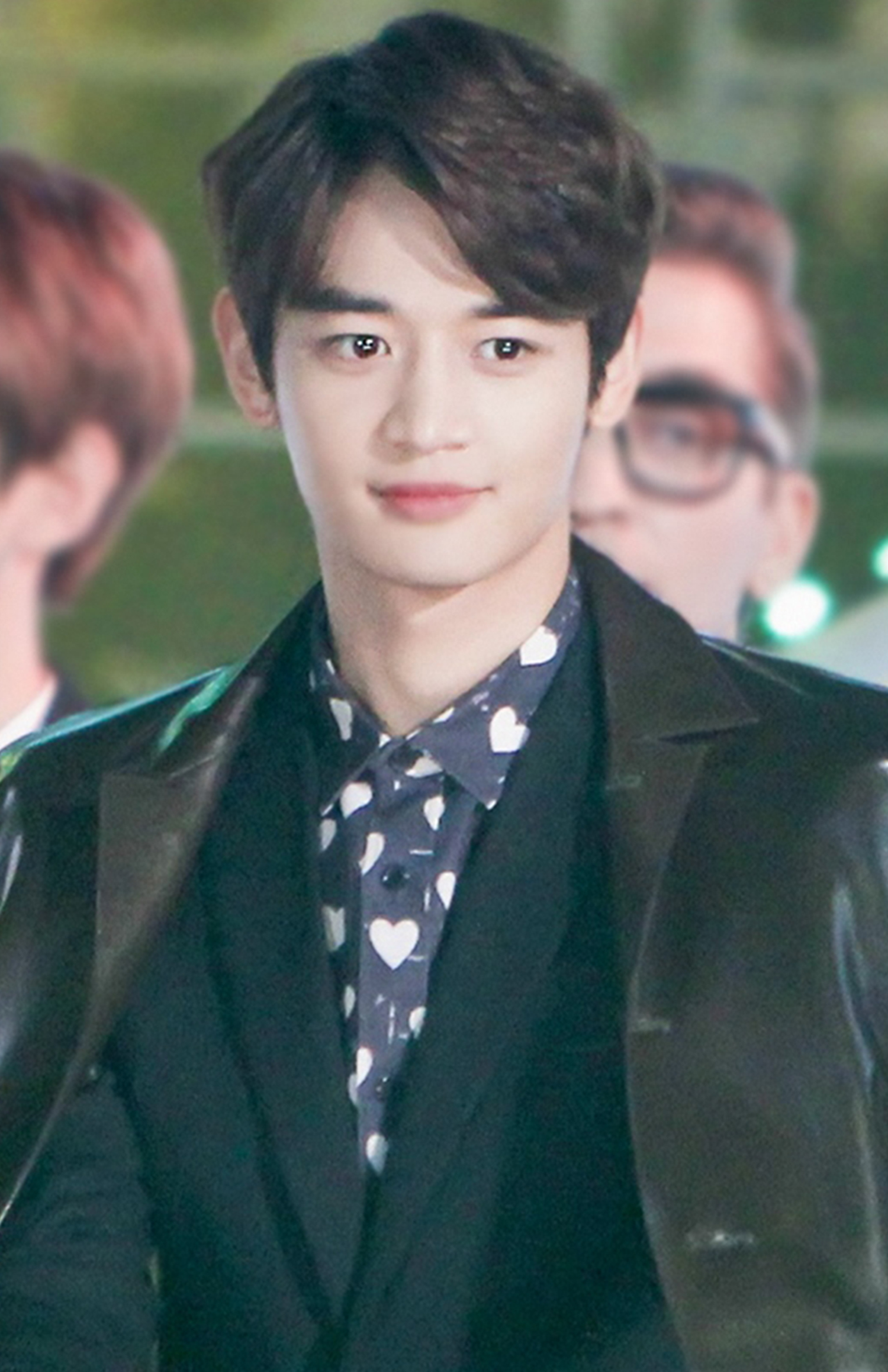
Shinee's Minho

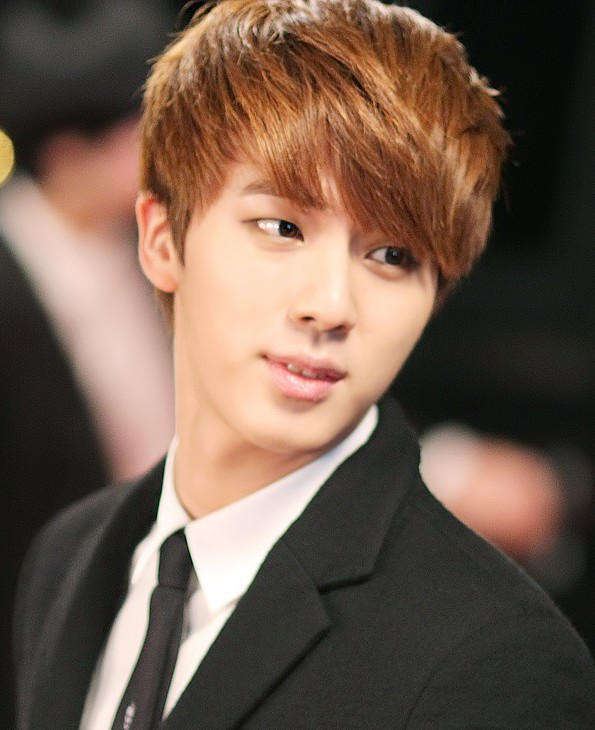
BTS's Jin

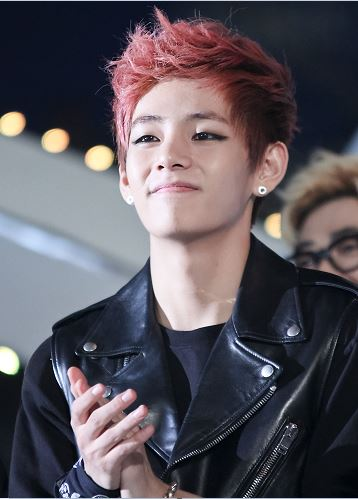
BTS's V

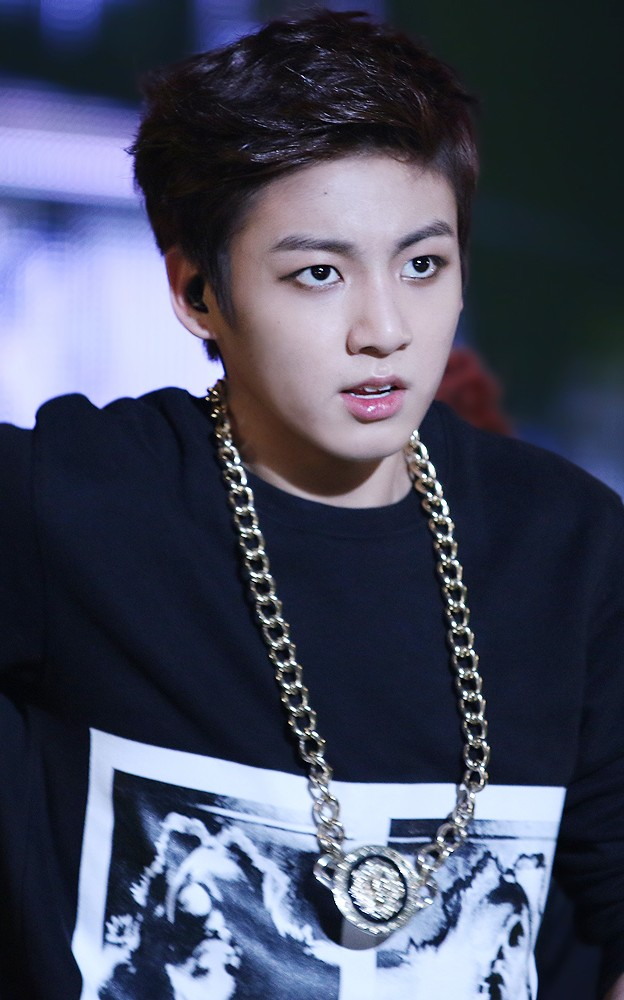
BTS's Jungkook

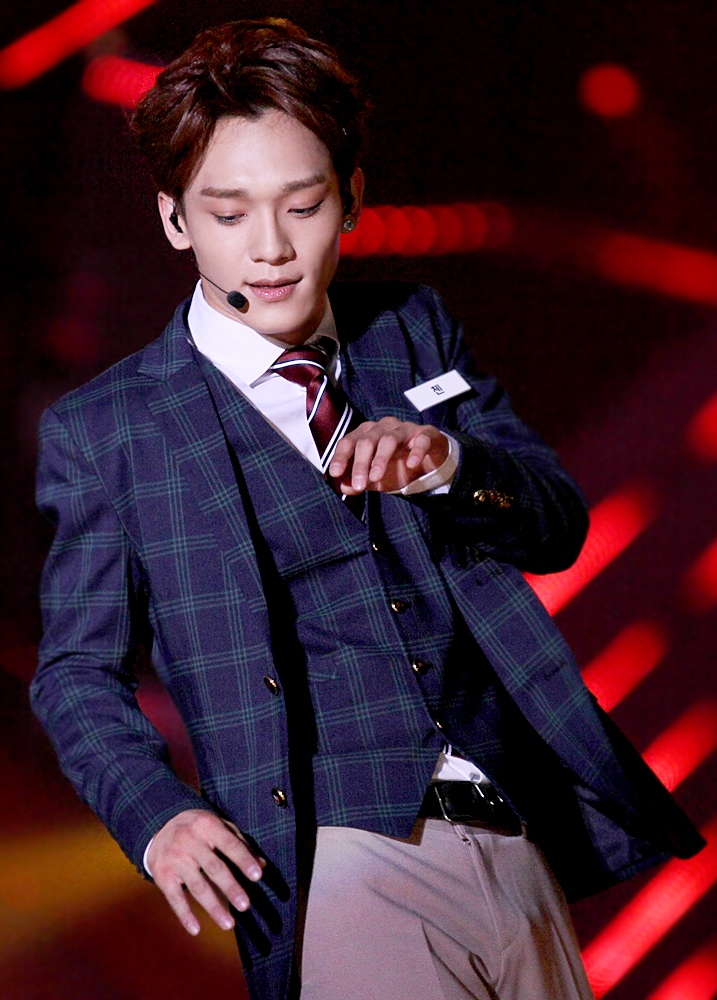
Exo's Chen
