= XOXO (Exo album) =

- XOXO album cover

Studio album by Exo
- Released: June 3, 2013
- Recorded: 2011–2013
- Studios: Doobdoob (Seoul); In Grid (Seoul); SM Big Shot (Seoul); SM Blue Cup (Seoul); SM Blue Ocean (Seoul); SM Concert Hall (Seoul); SM Yellow Tail (Seoul); Sound Pool (Seoul); T (Seoul)
- Genres: K-pop; hip hop; R&B; Mandopop
- Length: 43:48; 49:31 (Growl repackage)
- Languages: Korean; Mandarin; English
- Labels: SM; KT Music
- Producers: 12Keyz; Hayden Bell; Taeko Carroll; Choi Hyun-joon; E.One; Christian Fast; Goldfingerz; Goodwill; Hitchhiker; iDR; Im Kwang-kook; Jimmy Andrew Richard; Ryan S. Jhun; Joombas; JQ; Kenzie; Jay J. Kim; Jeong Ho-hyun; Kim Jin-hwan; Jordan Kyle; Lee Joo-hyoung; Lee Soo-man; Steven Lee; Lee Yun-jae; Chris Lightbody; John Major; MGI; Misfit; Henrick Nordenback; Robert Peters; Hyuk Shin; Robert Steinmiller; Will Simms; Charles Wiggins; Spencer Yaras

Exo chronology
| Mama (2012) | XOXO (2013) | Miracles in December (2013) |

Singles from XOXO
- 1. "Wolf" Released: June 3, 2013

Repackage edition cover
- Digital version cover

Singles from Growl
- 1. "Growl" Released: August 5, 2013

XOXO is the debut studio album by South Korean boy band Exo, released on June 3, 2013, by SM Entertainment and distributed by KT Music. The album is a follow-up to the group's debut EP, Mama (2012). The album was released in two versions – a Korean "Kiss" edition and a Chinese "Hug" edition.

Two singles were released from XOXO: "Wolf" and "Growl", the latter being the lead single off the album's repackaged version released on August 5, 2013. Both singles went to chart in the top ten of the Gaon Digital Chart, and "Growl" peaked at number 3 on the Billboard K-pop Hot 100. XOXO and its repackage sold over 570,000 copies and 760,000 copies in South Korea, respectively. The album won Album of the Year at the 2013 Mnet Asian Music Awards.

== Background ==
The album's lead single, "늑대와 미녀" ("The Wolf and the Beauty"), known in English as simply "Wolf", was composed by Will Simms, Nermin Harambašić from Dsign Music and SM Entertainment resident songwriter Kenzie. Kenzie also provided the lyrics for the Korean version of the song while Zhou Weijie penned the lyrics for the Mandarin Chinese version, "狼与美女". Yoo Young-jin provides background vocals. The dance for the song was choreographed by Tony Testa. In several shows such as Arirang's After School Club, the members explain that the dance has 3 elements: the trees and forest, the caves, and the wolf itself. Member Kris revealed that it took them approximately 3 to 4 months to get the choreography down, due to its level of difficulty. A demo version of the song was leaked in February 2013, in response to which producer Ryan Jhun later gave a warning to illegal downloaders on May 29, 2013, "...I will report it to FBI and service department for all links...".

Several "developmental" tracks were produced and recorded in 2011 before Exo's official debut into the entertainment industry but never made it into the first EP Mama. Some of these tracks were included on the XOXO album, including "Black Pearl" and "My Lady".

In July 2013, a re-package version of 'XOXO', renamed 으르렁 (Growl), was developed with three additional tracks. The single from this edition was its title track "Growl" (으르렁). The song was recorded in both Korean and Mandarin Chinese ("咆哮") versions. Composed by Hyuk Shin (Joombas), DK, Jordan Kyle, John Major, and Jarah Gibson, "Growl" is a dance-pop song with contemporary R&B and funk influences. The single was prematurely leaked online on July 27, when a video of the group practicing to the Korean version of the song was uploaded to various video-sharing websites.

== Release and promotion ==
May 30, 2013, the Korean and Chinese versions of the music video for "Wolf" were released, and the song's first performance was made on Mnet M! Countdown. Both song versions were released digitally on June 3, 2013, and on the same day, two physical formats of the entire album XOXO were also released in South Korea: a "Kiss" edition in Korean and a "Hug" edition in Mandarin. After a performance on SBS Inkigayo on June 3, 2013, Exo visited and thanked 2,000 fans who had been waiting at a nearby park to meet them. The first performance of the Mandarin version of the song was aired on a popular Chinese variety show Happy Camp in mid-June.

The album reached over 300,000 collective pre-orders, and peaked at number one on the Billboard World Album Chart a week after release. As of December 2013, the Korean and Chinese versions of the album, as well as their respective repackaged versions, have collectively sold over 1,070,000 copies and break a 12-year drought; "XOXO" becomes the first million-seller album in the Korean music industry.

== Awards ==
Awards and nominations for XOXO
| Year | Award | Category | Result | Ref. |
|---|---|---|---|---|
| 2013 | Melon Music Awards | Album of the Year | Nominated | |
| 2013 | Mnet Asian Music Awards | BC UnionPay Album of the Year | Won | |
| 2014 | Gaon Chart Music Awards | Album of the Year – 3rd Quarter | Won | |
| 2014 | Golden Disc Awards | Album Bonsang | Won | |
| 2014 | Golden Disc Awards | Album Daesang | Won | |
| 2014 | iF Design Awards | Best Packaging Design | Won | |
| 2014 | V Chart Awards | Album of the Year – South Korea | Won | |

== Track listing ==
Credits adapted from Naver.

=== XOXO (original edition) ===
Kiss edition (Korean version)
| No. | Title | Lyrics | Music | Arrangement | Length |
|---|---|---|---|---|---|
| 1. | "Wolf" (늑대와 미녀; Neukdaewa minyeo; 'Wolf and the Beauty') | Kenzie | Kenzie; Will Simms; Nermin Harambašić | Kenzie; Will Simms | 3:52 |
| 2. | "Baby Don't Cry" (인어의 눈물; Ineoui nunmul; 'A Mermaid's Tears') (sung by: Suho, Baekhyun, Chanyeol, D.O.) | Jo Yoon-kyung | Tesung Kim (Iconic Sounds); Im Kwang-wook (Devine Channel); Andrew Choi; Kalle Engström | Im Kwang-wook (Devine Channel) | 3:55 |
| 3. | "Black Pearl" | Seo Ji-eum | DK (Joombas); 2xxx! (Joombas); JJ Evans (Joombas); Hyuk Shin (Joombas); Deanfluenza (Joombas); TK; Jasmine Kearse; Brittani Marthena White | Joombas | 3:08 |
| 4. | "Don't Go" (나비소녀; Nabisonyeo; 'Butterfly Girl') | Seo Ji-eum | DK (Joombas); Hyuk Shin (Joombas); Jordan Kyle; John Major; Jeffrey Patrick Lewis | Hyuk Shin (Joombas); Jordan Kyle; John Major | 3:36 |
| 5. | "Let Out the Beast" | John Hyunkyu Lee | Jay J. Kim; Chris Lightbody; Robert Steinmiller; Spencer Yaras; Taeko Carroll; Robert Peters; Charles Wiggins | Jay J. Kim; Chris Lightbody; Robert Steinmiller; Spencer Yaras; Taeko Carroll; Robert Peters; Charles Wiggins | 3:27 |
| 6. | "3.6.5" | Jo Yoon-kyung | Hayden Bell; Christian Fast; Henrik Nordenback | Hayden Bell; Christian Fast; Henrik Nordenback | 3:07 |
| 7. | "Heart Attack" | Misfit | GoodWill; MGI | GoodWill; MGI | 3:39 |
| 8. | "Peter Pan" (피터팬; Piteopaen) | Hong Ji-yoo | 12Keyz; iDR; Ryan S. Jhun | 12Keyz; iDR; Ryan S. Jhun | 3:56 |
| 9. | "Baby" | Kenzie | Kim Jeong-bae; Kenzie | Kim Jeong-bae; Kenzie | 4:00 |
| 10. | "My Lady" | Kim Boo-min | Hitchhiker | Hitchhiker | 3:33 |
| 11. | "Wolf (EXO-K version)" (늑대와 미녀; Neukdaewa minyeo; 'Wolf and the Beauty') | Kenzie | Kenzie; Will Simms; Nermin Harambašić | Kenzie; Will Simms | 3:52 |
| 12. | "狼与美女 (Wolf)" (Láng Yǔ Měinǚ) (Trans.: Wolf and the Beauty) | Zhou Weijie | Kenzie; Will Simms; Nermin Harambašić | Kenzie; Will Simms | 3:52 |
| Total length: | | | | | 43:48 |

Hug edition (Chinese version)
| No. | Title | Lyrics | Music | Arrangement | Length |
|---|---|---|---|---|---|
| 1. | "狼与美女 (Wolf)" (traditional Chinese: 狼與美女; pinyin: Láng Yǔ Měinǚ) (Trans.: Wolf and the Beauty) | Zhou Weijie | Kenzie; Will Simms; Nermin Harambašić | Kenzie; Will Simms | 3:52 |
| 2. | "Baby Don't Cry (人鱼的眼泪)" (traditional Chinese: 人魚的眼淚; pinyin: Rényú de Yǎnlèi) (Trans.: A Mermaid's Tears) | Wang Yajun; T-Crash | Tesung Kim (Iconic Sounds); Im Kwang-wook (Devine Channel); Andrew Choi; Kalle Engström | Im Kwang-wook (Devine Channel) | 3:55 |
| 3. | "Black Pearl (黑珍珠)" | Liu Yuan | DK (Joombas); 2xxx! (Joombas); JJ Evans (Joombas); Hyuk Shin (Joombas); Deanfluenza (Joombas); TK; Jasmine Kearse; Brittani Marthena White | Joombas | 3:08 |
| 4. | "蝴蝶少女 (Don't Go)" (Húdié Shàonǚ) (Trans.: Butterfly Girl) | Wang Yajun | DK (Joombas); Hyuk Shin (Joombas); Jordan Kyle; John Major; Jeffrey Patrick Lewis | Hyuk Shin (Joombas); Jordan Kyle; John Major | 3:36 |
| 5. | "Let Out the Beast" | T-Crash | Charles Wiggins; Chris Lightbody; Jay J. Kim; Robert Peters; Robert Steinmiller; Spencer Yaras; Taeko Carroll | Charles Wiggins; Chris Lightbody; Jay J. Kim; Robert Peters; Robert Steinmiller; Spencer Yaras; Taeko Carroll | 3:27 |
| 6. | "3.6.5" | Wang Yajun | Hayden Bell; Christian Fast; Henrik Nordenback | Hayden Bell; Christian Fast; Henrik Nordenback | 3:07 |
| 7. | "Heart Attack" | Zhou Weijie | MGI; GoodWill | MGI; GoodWill | 3:39 |
| 8. | "彼得潘 (Peter Pan)" (Bǐdépān) | Liu Yuan | 12Keyz; iDR; Ryan S. Jhun | 12Keyz; iDR; Ryan S. Jhun | 3:56 |
| 9. | "Baby (第一步)" (Dìyī Bù) (Trans.: The First Step) | Liu Yuan | Kim Jeong-bae; Kenzie | Kim Jeong-bae; Kenzie | 4:00 |
| 10. | "My Lady" | Liu Yuan | Hitchhiker | Hitchhiker | 3:33 |
| 11. | "狼与美女 (Wolf) (EXO-M version)" (Trans.: Wolf and the Beauty) | Zhou Weijie | Kenzie; Will Simms; Nermin Harambašić | Kenzie; Will Simms | 3:52 |
| 12. | "Wolf" (늑대와 미녀; Neukdaewa minyeo; 'Wolf and the Beauty') | Kenzie | Kenzie; Will Simms; Nermin Harambašić | Kenzie; Will Simms | 3:52 |
| Total length: | | | | | 43:48 |

=== Growl (repackaged edition) ===
Kiss edition (Korean version)
| No. | Title | Lyrics | Music | Arrangement | Length |
|---|---|---|---|---|---|
| 1. | "Growl" (으르렁; Eureureong) | Seo Ji-eum | Hyuk Shin (Joombas); DK (Joombas); Jordan Kyle; Jarah Lafayette Gibson | Hyuk Shin (Joombas); Jordan Kyle; John Major | 3:29 |
| 2. | "Wolf" (늑대와 미녀; Neukdaewa minyeo; 'Wolf and the Beauty') | Kenzie | Kenzie; Will Simms; Nermin Harambašić | Kenzie; Will Simms | 3:52 |
| 3. | "XOXO (Kisses & Hugs)" | Misfit | Steven Lee; Goldfingerz; Jimmy Andrew Richard | Steven Lee; Goldfingerz; Jimmy Andrew Richard | 3:08 |
| 4. | "Lucky" (운이 좋은; Uni joeun) | Kim Eana; Chanyeol; Baekhyun | Jeong Ho-hyun (e.one); Choi Hyun-joon | Jeong Ho-hyun (e.one); Choi Hyun-joon | 3:25 |
| 5. | "Baby Don't Cry" (인어의 눈물; Ineoui nunmul; 'A Mermaid's Tears') (sung by: Suho, Baekhyun, Chanyeol, D.O.) | Jo Yoon-kyung | Tesung Kim (Iconic Sounds); Im Kwang-wook (Devine Channel); Andrew Choi; Kalle Engstrom | Im Kwang-wook (Devine Channel) | 3:55 |
| 6. | "Black Pearl" (검은 진주; Geomeun jinju) | Seo Ji-eum | DK (Joombas); 2xxx! (Joombas); JJ Evans (Joombas); Hyuk Shin (Joombas); Deanfluenza (Joombas); TK; Jasmine Kearse; Brittani Marthena White | Joombas | 3:08 |
| 7. | "Don't Go" (나비소녀; Nabisonyeo; 'Butterfly Girl') | Seo Ji-eum | DK (Joombas); Hyuk Shin (Joombas); Jordan Kyle; John Major; Jeffrey Patrick Lewis | Hyuk Shin (Joombas); Jordan Kyle; John Major | 3:36 |
| 8. | "Let Out the Beast" (짐승을 보자; Jimseungeul boja) | John Hyunkyu Lee | Jay J. Kim; Chris Lightbody; Robert Steinmiller; Spencer Yaras; Taeko Carroll; Robert Peters; Charles Wiggins | Jay J. Kim; Chris Lightbody; Robert Steinmiller; Spencer Yaras; Taeko Carroll; Robert Peters; Charles Wiggins | 3:27 |
| 9. | "3.6.5" (세 여섯 다섯; Se yeoseot daseot) | Jo Yoon-kyung | Hayden Bell; Christian Fast; Henrik Nordenback | Hayden Bell; Christian Fast; Henrik Nordenback | 3:07 |
| 10. | "Heart Attack" (심장 마비; Simjang mabi) | Misfit | GoodWill; MGI | GoodWill; MGI | 3:39 |
| 11. | "Peter Pan" (피터팬; Piteopaen) | Hong Ji-yoo | 12Keyz; iDR; Ryan S. Jhun | 12Keyz; iDR; Ryan S. Jhun | 3:56 |
| 12. | "Baby" (아가; Aga) | Kenzie | Kim Jeong-bae; Kenzie | Kim Jeong-bae; Kenzie | 4:00 |
| 13. | "My Lady" (내 여자; Nae yeoja) | Kim Boo-min | Hitchhiker | Hitchhiker | 3:33 |
| 14. | "Growl (EXO-K version)" (으르렁; Eureureong) | Seo Ji-eum | Hyuk Shin (Joombas); DK (Joombas); Jordan Kyle; Jarah Lafayette Gibson | Hyuk Shin (Joombas); Jordan Kyle; John Major | 3:27 |
| Total length: | | | | | 49:31 |

Hug edition (Chinese version)
| No. | Title | Lyrics | Music | Arrangement | Length |
|---|---|---|---|---|---|
| 1. | "咆哮 (Growl)" (pinyin: Páoxiāo) | Wang Yajun | Hyuk Shin (Joombas); DK (Joombas); Jordan Kyle; Jarah Lafayette Gibson | Hyuk Shin (Joombas); John Major; Jordan Kyle | 3:27 |
| 2. | "狼与美女 (Wolf) (EXO Version)" (Trans.: Wolf and the Beauty) | Zhou Weijie | Kenzie; Will Simms; Nermin Harambašić | Kenzie; Will Simms | 3:52 |
| 3. | "XOXO (Kisses & Hugs)" | Lin Xinye | Steven Lee; Goldfingerz; Jimmy Richard | Steven Lee; Goldfingerz; Jimmy Richard | 3:06 |
| 4. | "Lucky (幸运)" | Liu Yuan | Jeong Ho-hyun (e.one); Choi Hyun-joon | Jeong Ho-hyun (e.one); Choi Hyun-joon | 3:23 |
| 5. | "Baby Don't Cry (人鱼的眼泪)" (traditional Chinese: 人魚的眼淚; pinyin: Rényú de Yǎnlèi) (Trans.: A Mermaid's Tears) | Wang Yajun; T-Crash | Tesung Kim (Iconic Sounds); Im Kwang-wook (Devine Channel); Andrew Choi; Kalle Engstrom | Tesung Kim (Iconic Sounds); Im Kwang-wook (Devine Channel) | 3:55 |
| 6. | "Black Pearl (黑珍珠)" | Liu Yuan | DK (Joombas); 2xxx! (Joombas); JJ Evans (Joombas); Hyuk Shin (Joombas); Deanfluenza (Joombas); TK; Jasmine Kearse; Brittani Marthena White | Joombas | 3:08 |
| 7. | "蝴蝶少女 (Don't Go)" (pinyin: Húdié Shàonǚ) (Trans.: Butterfly Girl) | Wang Yajun | DK (Joombas); Hyuk Shin (Joombas); Jordan Kyle; John Major; Jeffrey Patrick Lewis | John Major; Hyuk Shin (Joombas); Jordan Kyle | 3:36 |
| 8. | "Let Out the Beast (让出兽)" | T-Crash | Jay J. Kim; Robert Peters; Spencer Yaras; Taeko Carroll; Charles Wiggins; Chris Lightbody; Robert Steinmiller | Jay J. Kim; Robert Peters; Spencer Yaras; Taeko Carroll; Charles Wiggins; Chris Lightbody; Robert Steinmiller | 3:27 |
| 9. | "3.6.5 (三 六 五)" | Wang Yajun | Hayden Bell; Christian Fast; Henrik Nordenback | Hayden Bell; Christian Fast; Henrik Nordenback | 3:07 |
| 10. | "Heart Attack (心脏病发作)" | Zhou Weijie | GoodWill; MGI | GoodWill; MGI | 3:39 |
| 11. | "彼得潘 (Peter Pan)" (pinyin: Bǐdépān) | Liu Yuan | 12Keyz; iDR; Ryan S. Jhun | 12Keyz; iDR; Ryan S. Jhun | 3:56 |
| 12. | "Baby (第一步)" (pinyin: Dìyī Bù) (Trans.: The First Step) | Liu Yuan | Kim Jeong-bae; Kenzie | Kim Jeong-bae; Kenzie | 4:00 |
| 13. | "My Lady (我的女士)" | Liu Yuan | Hitchhiker | Hitchhiker | 3:33 |
| 14. | "咆哮 (Growl) (EXO-M Version)" | Wang Yajun | Hyuk Shin (Joombas); DK (Joombas); Jordan Kyle; Jarah Lafayette Gibson | Hyuk Shin (Joombas); John Major; Jordan Kyle | 3:27 |
| Total length: | | | | | 49:31 |

== Charts ==
Korean and Chinese versions
| Chart | Peak position | | | |
| | XOXO Kiss | XOXO Hug | Growl Kiss | Growl Hug |
|---|---|---|---|---|
| South Korea Weekly Albums (Gaon) | 1 | 2 | 1 | 2 |
| South Korea Monthly Albums (Gaon) | 1 | 2 | 1 | 2 |
| South Korea Yearly Albums – 2013 | 3 | 6 | 1 | 7 |
| South Korea Yearly Albums – 2014 | 53 | 83 | 15 | 67 |
| South Korea Yearly Albums – 2015 | — | — | 71 | — |
| Japan Weekly Albums (Oricon) | 9 | 18 | — | — |
| Japan Monthly Albums (Oricon) | 18 | 36 | — | — |

Combined version
| Chart | Peak position |
|---|---|
| US Heatseekers Albums (Billboard) | 23 |
| US World Albums (Billboard) | 1 |

== Sales ==
XOXO
| Chart | Sales |
|---|---|
| Japan (Oricon) | 28,000 (Hug version) |
| Japan (Oricon) | 62,000 (Kiss version) |
| South Korea (Gaon) | 200,870 (Hug version) |
| South Korea (Gaon) | 372,597 (Kiss version) |

Growl (Repackage)
| Chart | Sales |
|---|---|
| South Korea (Gaon) | 200,183 (Hug version) |
| South Korea (Gaon) | 556,823 (Kiss version) |

== Release history ==
| Edition | Date | Region | Format | Label | Catalog |
|---|---|---|---|---|---|
| Original | June 3, 2013 | Worldwide / South Korea | CD, digital download | SM Entertainment, KT Music | SMK0242 |
| Original | June 3, 2013 | Worldwide / South Korea | CD, digital download | SM Entertainment, KT Music | SMK0243 |
| Original | July 19, 2013 | Taiwan | CD, digital download | Avex | AVKCD80280/A |
| Original | July 19, 2013 | Taiwan | CD, digital download | Avex | AVKCD80280/B |
| Original | July 27, 2013 | Philippines | CD, digital download | Universal Records | SMK0242 |
| Original | July 27, 2013 | Philippines | CD, digital download | Universal Records | SMK0243 |
| Original | June 12, 2013 | Thailand | CD, digital download | S.M. True | |
| Repackage | August 5, 2013 | Worldwide / South Korea | CD, digital download | SM Entertainment, KT Music | SMK0275 |
| Repackage | August 5, 2013 | Worldwide / South Korea | CD, digital download | SM Entertainment, KT Music | SMK0276 |
| Repackage | September 13, 2013 | Taiwan | CD, digital download | Avex Taiwan | AVKCD80280/C |
| Repackage | September 13, 2013 | Taiwan | CD, digital download | Avex Taiwan | AVKCD80280/D |
| Repackage | August 16, 2013 | Thailand | CD, digital download | S.M. True | |
