= The Dream Chapter: Magic =

- Digital and Sanctuary version cover

Studio album by Tomorrow X Together
- Released: October 21, 2019
- Genres: R&B; tropical house; acoustic pop; hip-hop
- Length: 27:43
- Languages: Korean; English
- Labels: Big Hit; Republic
- Producers: Supreme Boi; Slow Rabbit; Sam Klempner; Shae Jacobs; Wonderkid; Peter Thomas; Pdogg; Jordan Kyle; Shinkung

Tomorrow X Together chronology
The Dream Chapter: Star (2019)	The Dream Chapter: Magic (2019)	The Dream Chapter: Eternity (2020)

Singles from The Dream Chapter: Magic
- 1. "9 and Three Quarters (Run Away)" Released: October 21, 2019

The Dream Chapter: Magic (Korean: 꿈의 장: Magic; RR: Kkum-ui jang: maejik) is the debut studio album by South Korean boy band Tomorrow X Together. It was released on October 21, 2019, by Big Hit Entertainment and Republic Records. It serves as a follow-up to the band's debut extended play The Dream Chapter: Star (2019). The album contains eight songs, including the lead single, "9 and Three Quarters (Run Away)". Musically, the album incorporates different genres including R&B, tropical house, acoustic pop, and hip-hop. Commercially, the album debuted atop South Korea's Gaon Album Chart, becoming Tomorrow X Together's second chart-topping release of the year. It also charted on the US Billboard World Albums chart at number three. To promote the album, the band appeared on several South Korean music programs.

== Background and release ==
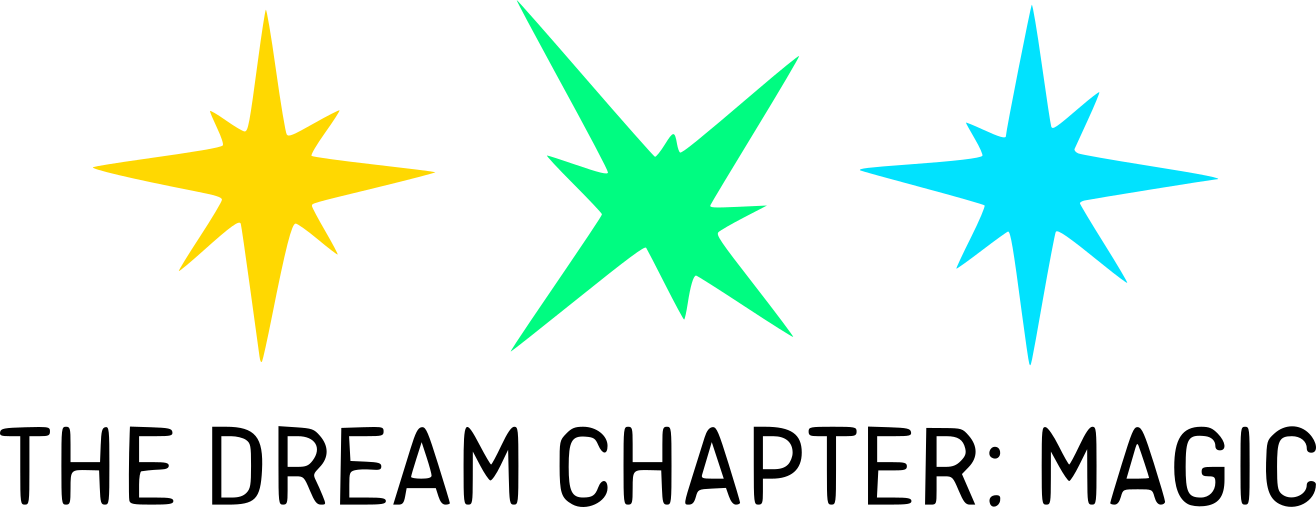
The band's modified logo used for promotional activities

The Dream Chapter: Magic is the band's first studio album. It follows their debut EP The Dream Chapter: Star released in March 2019. On October 1, a teaser video was released on YouTube, announcing that the band will release their first full-length album on October 21. The first official concept trailer for the album was released on October 3. The trailer combines two-dimensional graphics using the group's dynamic performance and projection mapping to stir a mysterious atmosphere. Following the release of the concept trailer, two sets of concept photos-"Sanctuary" and "Arcadia" versions were released. The Sanctuary version of the concept photos was released on October 7, alongside a mood board showing the boys in school. The Arcadia version, released a day later portrayed a darker theme. Both the concept photo versions express the boys' dream of deviance. On October 11, the tracklist of the full album was released, along-with the album cover. On October 17, a second teaser video for the album was released on the band's official website revealing the lead single "9 and Three Quarters (Run Away)" and demonstrating some of the energetic performances of the members. On October 18, the band released a preview video of the album on their official website. On October 21, The Dream Chapter: Magic was released physically and digitally alongside a music video for the album's lead single "9 and Three Quarters (Run Away)".

Individual teasers for the members (Soobin, Yeonjun, Beomgyu, Taehyun, Huening Kai) were released for the music video of the acoustic pop track "Magic Island" from November 13 to November 16. The official music video for "Magic Island" was released on November 17. Individual teasers for each of the members were released for the music video of the track "Angel or Devil". The official music video was released on November 28.

== Composition ==
Musically, the album spans a variety of different music genres, including R&B, tropical house, acoustic pop, and hip-hop. The album opens with "a breathy, groovy jam" of "New Rules" that shifts "into its shout-along, anthemic chorus and turning into the trap-inflected hook". The album's lead single, "9 and Three Quarters (Run Away)" is a synth-pop track with new wave vibes, featuring a satisfying rock-pop chorus. The song is about finding strength in sacred moments shared among friends, alluding to Platform 9¾. "Can't We Just Leave the Monster Alive?" and "Magic Island" are electropop songs while "Roller Coaster" is a house-pop. "Popping Star" is a bubblegum pop. "Angel or Devil" is an exuberant bouncy hip-hop track while "20cm" is an "R&B ballad".

== Music videos ==
A music video for the electro-rock single "9 and Three Quarters (Run Away)" was released on October 21. The video portrays the band as high schoolers who are transported to a new world where they are allowed to embrace their magic and be themselves. The music video was directed and produced by OUI.

A music video for "Magic Island" was released on November 17. The video features references to the past videos of "Nap of a Star" and "9 and Three Quarters (Run Away)". The 14-minute long video is more along the lines of a short mini-film where the five members of the band are seen as students having adventures together and getting mysteriously transported to a fantasy land. The music video was directed and produced by Digipedi.

A subsequent music video for "Angel or Devil" was released on November 28. The video explores the dichotomy of the song's lyrics and title and emphasizes the high-energy choreography of the members while debating being "Angel or Devil."

== Promotion ==
According to a press release, The Dream Chapter: Magic will showcase "the second story of the boys chasing their dreams."

=== Pre-release ===
On October 3, the band released a concept trailer video. Featuring the group's colorful aesthetics, the members were seen to perform "gravity-defying" choreography. The members were seen playing shapes and perspectives, projections, and 3D graphics against the backdrop of a blank canvas. On October 17, the official teaser of the album's lead single "9 and Three Quarters (Run Away)" was released. The video begins with Taehyun standing in the middle of the hallway where many students come and go. Close-ups of the members staring at the camera with deep eyes appear in the middle of the video, creating a mysterious atmosphere. The members are also seen to perform dynamic choreography.

=== Live performances ===
On October 21, Tomorrow X Together began promoting the lead single "9 and Three Quarters (Run Away)", "New Rules" and "Angel or Devil" on South Korean music shows. On the same day, they held a live showcase at the concert hall of Yonsei University in Seodaemun-gu, Seoul. On October 29, "9 and Three Quarters (Run Away)" won first place at SBS MTV's The Show.

== Critical reception ==
"Inspired by the starting point of Harry Potter’s adventures, “9 and Three Quarters (Run Away)” begins with dulcet twinkling and then rapidly takes a dive into pop-rock territory, bolstering the members’ fantastically distorted vocals as punkish instrumentals duke it out with quirky electronic elements and sweet harmonies. Everything about “Run Away” is exciting and pristinely melded together, creating a soundscape is truly magical and casts a spell on those who hear it, making it so that we never want to stop listening to it."

— T.H. from Billboard

Billboard described the album as a "complex, varied soundscape inspired by the titular theme, with elements of groove, punk-pop, R&B, house, and a whole wide range of other genres littered throughout as the five -- Soobin, Yeonjun, Beomgyu, Taehyun, and Huening Kai -- share more sides to themselves as one of this year's most sonically exciting rookie acts." Writing for MTV, Crystal Bell commended the "eclectic mix of genres" of the album, that "diversifies the group's sound without completely losing their signature energy and stylistic flourishes". The lead single "9 and Three Quarters (Run Away)" was ranked No. 2 on Dazed's list of the 20 best K-pop songs of 2019, with the magazine describing the song as "seamlessly woven and infused with a magnetic urgency" that has "the undercurrents – chunky, compressed drums and tight guitar riffs" which "are amplified to stadium rock levels, chasing the melody into a gloriously hooky, firework of a chorus where TXT’s vocals burst forth with a luminous mix of desperation and rebellion". Billboard included the song in its list of "The 25 Best K-pop Songs of 2019: Critics' Picks". "Magic Island" was included in MTV's list of "The Best K-pop B-sides of 2019".

== Commercial performance ==
The Dream Chapter: Magic debuted at No. 1 on the Gaon Album Chart, surpassing 124,000 sales in its first week. This marked the group's second chart-topping album following The Dream Chapter: Star. The album debuted at No. 3 on Billboard's World Albums Chart. The album also opened at No. 6 on the Heatseeker's Album Chart. A total of four tracks from the album entered the Billboard World Digital Songs chart with the lead single "9 and Three Quarters (Run Away)" debuting at No. 2. Additionally, "New Rules" opened at No. 16, "20cm" at No. 18 and "Angel or Devil" at No. 21.

== Track listing ==
The credits are adapted from the official album profile on Naver.

No.	Title	Writer(s)	Producer(s)	Length
1.	"New Rules"	Supreme Boi; El Capitxn; Daniel Caesar; Ludwig Lindell; Jordan “DJ Swivel” Young; Candace Nicole Sosa; Max Lynedoch Graham; Matt Thomson; Wilhelm Börjesson; danke	Supreme Boi	2:54
2.	"9 and Three Quarters (Run Away)" (9와 4분의 3 승강장에서 너를 기다려^{[a]})	"Hitman" Bang; Supreme Boi; Slow Rabbit; Melanie Joy Fontana; Michel "Lindgren" Schulz; Andreas Carlsson; Pauline Skött; Peter St. James	Slow Rabbit	3:31
3.	"Roller Coaster" (간지러워^{[b]})	"Hitman" Bang; Supreme Boi; Sam Klempner; Jacob Attwooll; Slow Rabbit; Adora; Hueningkai; El Capitxn; Bobby Chung	Sam Klempner	3:34
4.	"Poppin' Star"	"Hitman" Bang; Shae Jacobs; Lauren Amber Aquilina; Adora; Jung Su-kyung; Song Jae-kyung	Shae Jacobs	3:13
5.	"Can't We Just Leave the Monster Alive?" (그냥 괴물을 살려두면 안 되는 걸까^{[c]})	"Hitman" Bang; Wonderkid; Shinkung; Melanie Joy Fontana; Michel "Lindgren" Schulz; Adora; Joni; Jung Su-kyung	Wonderkid; Shinkung	3:50
6.	"Magic Island"	"Hitman" Bang; Supreme Boi; Slow Rabbit; Peter Thomas; Jake Torrey; Song Jae-kyung; Joni; GHSTLOOP	Peter Thomas	3:12
7.	"20cm"	"Hitman" Bang; Supreme Boi; Jordan Kyle; Hyuk Shin; Jayrah Gibson; danke; Slow Rabbit; Adora; Hiss noise; Bobby Chung; Joni	Jordan Kyle; Hyuk Shin	3:37
8.	"Angel or Devil"	"Hitman" Bang; Supreme Boi; Pdogg; Slow Rabbit; Melanie Joy Fontana; Michel "Lindgren" Schulz; Peter Ibsen; Naitumela Masuku	Pdogg; Slow Rabbit	3:52
Total length:				27:43

Notes

- ^[a] Gu-wa sa-bun-ui sam seunggangjang-eseo neoreul gidaryeo lit. "Waiting for you at Platform 9 3/4"
- ^[b] Ganjireowo lit. "Itchy"
- ^[c] Geunyang goemur-eul sallyeodumyeon an doeneun geolkka?

== Personnel ==
Credits adapted from AllMusic and Tidal.

- Adora – digital editing, recording engineer, vocal arrangement, background vocals
- Lauren Aquilina – background vocals
- Jacob Attwooll- recording engineer, background vocals
- "Hitman" Bang – production
- TXT – primary vocals
- Caesar & Loui – recording engineer, background vocals
- El Capitxn – production, digital editing, recording engineer, keyboard, synthesizer, vocal arrangement
- Jon Castelli – mix engineer
- Hector Castillo – mix engineer, studio personnel
- Melanie Joy Fontana – background vocals
- Ingmar Carlsen – mixing assistance, studio personnel
- DJ Riggins – recording assistance, studio personnel
- Yang Ga – mix engineer, studio personnel
- Ghstloop – digital editing
- Jayrah Gibson – background vocals
- John Haynes – mix engineer, studio personnel
- Hi-Bye – background vocals
- Hiss Noise – digital editing, synthesizer, vocal arrangement
- Shae Jacobs – production, recording engineer, programming, background vocals, instruments
- Jaycen Joshua – mix engineer, studio personnel
- Nicole Kim – A&R
- Sam Klempner – production, bass, drums, recording engineer, keyboard, mix engineer, programming, synthesizer, background vocals, studio personnel
- Jordan Kyle – production, drums, recording engineer, guitar, keyboard, synthesizer
- Gia Lim – A&R
- Randy Merill – mastering engineer, studio personnel
- Pdogg – production, keyboard, synthesizer
- Revine - digital editing
- Jacob Richards - recording assistance, studio personnel
- Mike Seaberg - recording assistance, studio personnel
- Michel Lindgren Schulz – recording engineer
- Slow Rabbit – production, digital editing, recording engineer, keyboard, programming, synthesizer, vocal arrangement
- Soulman – background vocals
- Supreme Boi – production, digital editing, keyboard, synthesizer, vocal arrangement
- Peter Thomas – production, drums programming, recording engineer, guitar, piano, background vocals, whistle
- Jake Torrey – engineering, background vocals
- Wonderkid- production, digital editing, keyboard, synthesizer, vocal arrangement
- Shinkung- production
- X-Limit – background vocals
- Hiju Yang – A&R
- Jordan “DJ Swivel” Young – recording engineer, background vocals
- Tiffany Young – guitar

== Charts ==
=== Weekly charts ===
Chart (2019–2020)	Peak position
Australian Digital Albums (ARIA)	22
Belgian Albums (Ultratop Flanders)	125
French Downloads Albums (SNEP)	39
Hungarian Albums (MAHASZ)	31
Japanese Albums (Oricon)	11
South Korean Albums (Gaon)	1
UK Album Downloads (Official Charts)	29
US World Albums (Billboard)	3

=== Year-end charts ===
Chart (2019)	Position
South Korean Albums (Gaon)	27

== Accolades ==
Year-end lists
Critic/Publication	List	Song	Rank	Ref.
Billboard	The 25 Best K-pop Songs of 2019	"9 and Three Quarters (Run Away)"	4	
BuzzFeed	Best K-pop Music Videos of 2019	"9 and Three Quarters (Run Away)"	6	
BuzzFeed	30 Songs That Helped Define K-Pop in 2019	"9 and Three Quarters (Run Away)"	6	
Dazed	The 20 best K-pop songs of 2019	"9 and Three Quarters (Run Away)"	2	
South China Morning Post	The 10 best K-pop songs of 2019	"9 and Three Quarters (Run Away)"	9	
MTV	The Best K-pop B-sides of 2019	"Magic Island"	9	

Music program awards
Song	Program	Date	Ref.
"9 and Three Quarters (Run Away)"	The Show (SBS MTV)	October 29, 2019	

== Certifications and sales ==
Region	Certification	Certified units/sales
Japan	—	5,600
South Korea (KMCA)	Platinum	202,302
United States	—	2,000

== Release history ==
Country	Date	Format	Label
South Korea	October 21, 2019	CD; digital download; streaming	Big Hit
Japan	October 21, 2019	CD; digital download; streaming	Big Hit; Universal
Various	October 21, 2019	Digital download; streaming	Big Hit
United States	November 22, 2019 (Note: Sanctuary version (green box))	CD	Big Hit; Republic
United States	December 6, 2019 (Note: Arcadia version (black box))	CD	Big Hit; Republic

== See also ==
- List of Gaon Album Chart number ones of 2019
- List of K-pop songs on the Billboard charts
- List of K-pop albums on the Billboard charts
