= Jordan Kyle =

- Origin: Buffalo, New York, United States
- Occupations: Songwriter, producer, audio engineer
- Years active: 2010–present
- Website: j27.co

Jordan Kyle is an American record producer, songwriter and sound engineer, based in Los Angeles, California, United States. He has written and produced for Exo, TXT, Girls' Generation, Shinee, Super Junior-D&E, Exo-CBX, Oh My Girl, Cosmic Girls, Adventure Club, LOONA, Kep1er, Terravita, UNINE, Jake Zyrus, Madtown, A.C.E, Justin Huang, Niel, History, Bada, Speed, Royal Pirates, HALO, Uniq, Jinho, NOMAD, Asia Cruise, Iyaz and more. His corporate works include music creation for Disney, MTV, Sony Music, and Rocawear. Jordan's song for Zyrus (formerly Charice Pempengco) was written with Jason Derulo and Kara DioGuardi. His work includes the #86 most played song on Canadian radio since 2001, the #5 best selling K-Pop single in America / Billboard Best K-Pop Song of The Year in 2013, and composition / production on the #12 best selling Korean album ever - having been part of a national sales record not seen for over 12 years in Korea. In 2018, EXO's "Growl" was performed in the PyeongChang Winter Olympics. In 2019, Billboard staff voted "Growl" into "The 100 Greatest K-Pop Songs of the 2010s". In 2023, Rolling Stone rated "Growl" #34 of "The 100 Greatest Songs in the History of Korean Pop Music".

== Selected Discography ==
Year	Artist	Album	Notes	Charts/Awards/Labels
2010	Craig Smart	123	Producer, Co-writer, Mixing ("123")	Certified Canadian Gold; No. 33 Billboard Hot 100; No. 86 SoundScan 100 Most Popular Canadian Songs of The Millennium
2011	Jake Zyrus	Infinity	Co-producer, Co-writer ("Lesson For Life")	Warner Records; No. 8 Billboard Top Albums; No. 5 Oricon Albums
2013	Girls' Generation	I Got a Boy	Producer, Co-writer, Engineering ("Romantic St.")	SM Entertainment; No. 1 Album in Korea, Taiwan, Hong Kong, Singapore, United States and Philippines; No. 7 Japan Oricon Weekly Albums Chart
2013	Shinee	Dream Girl – The Misconceptions of You; The Misconceptions of Us	Co-producer ("Dream Girl")	SM Entertainment; No. 1 Gaon; No. 3 Billboard K-Pop Hot 100; No. 2 Billboard World Albums; No. 5 Billboard Heatseekers; No. 10 Oricon Albums; Nominated for Song of the Year at the 2013 Golden Disk Awards; No. 1 Inkigayo (3/17/13); No. 1 Music Bank (3/8/13, 3/15/13); No. 1 Show Champion (2/27/13, 3/6/13, 3/13/13, 3/20/13); No. 1 M-Countdown (2/28/13, 3/7/13, 3/14/13)
2013	Shinee	Boys Meet U	Co-producer ("Dream Girl" Japanese Version); Co-producer ("Dream Girl" Instrumental)	Certified Japanese Gold; No. 2 Billboard Japan Hot 100; No. 1 G-Music Asia; No. 1 Hit FM Asia; No. 1 Oricon Chart
2013	Exo	XOXO	Co-producer, Co-writer, Engineering ("Don't Go")	SM Entertainment; No. 1 Billboard World Albums Chart; No. 1 South Korea (Gaon and Hanteo Charts) and Japan (Oricon Chart); No. 23 Billboard US Top Heatseekers Albums; No. 2 Vinyuetai V-Chart Album of the Year<Album of the Year – Mnet Music Awards> Disk Bonsang – Golden Disk Award
2013	Exo	XOXO Growl Repackage	Co-producer, Co-writer, Engineering ("Growl")	SM Entertainment; No. 1 Billboard World Albums No. 3 Billboard K-Pop Hot 100; No. 1 on Bugs, Gaon, MelOn, Soribada, Daum, Monkey3, Olleh and Naver (Korea); No. 1 M Countdown (8/22/13, 8/23/13); No. 1 Inkigayo (8/18/13, 8/25/13, 9/1/13): Over 1,600,000 single sales of "Growl"; Over 1,296,063 albums sold (XOXO + Repackage); Gaon Sales: 2,023,254; Billboard Best K-Pop Song of 2013; Melon Music Awards Best Song of the Year; KBS Music Festival Song of The Year; MAMA Album of The Year; Golden Disk Daesang - Grand Prize Winner; Performed at the 2018 Winter Olympics Closing Ceremony and Paralympic Games; Billboard 2019 “The 100 Greatest K-Pop Songs of the 2010s: Staff List”; Rolling Stone 2023 "The 100 Greatest Songs in the History of Korean Pop Music"
2014	Madtown	Mad Town - Super Debut	Producer, Writer (music), Mixing ("YOLO", "YOLO Instrumental")	No. 11 Gaon Weekly Album Chart; No. 31 Inkigayo Chart; No. 37 MelOn M/V Chart; No. 54 MelOn Chart; No. 12 YinYueTai "Top 20 MV" Chart; No. 20 Germany Kpop Chart
2014	Shinee	I'm Your Boy; I'm Your Boy (Deluxe Edition)	Co-producer ("Dream Girl (Japanese Version)")	No. 1 Oricon Weekly Albums Chart; No. 7 Oricon Monthly Albums Chart; No. 9 Gaon Weekly Album Chart; No. 25 Gaon Monthly Album Chart
2014	Uniq	Uniq	Producer, Co-writer, Engineering, Mixing ("Falling In Love" Korean, Chinese, and English versions)	Yuehua Entertainment; No. 9 Gaon Weibo Chart; No. 33 Gaon Social Chart; No. 6 YinYueTai V-Chart
2015	Oh My Girl	Oh My Girl - 1st Mini Album	Co-producer, Co-writer, Engineering ("Cupid")	WM Entertainment; No. 8 MelOn Chart; No. 12 MCountdown Chart; No. 10 MelOn Realtime Chart; No. 6 Gaon Chart
2015	Uniq	Uniq - 1st Mini Album	Co-producer, Co-writer, Engineering, Mixing ("Listen To Me" Korean and Chinese versions)	Yuehua Entertainment; No. 26 Baidu Chart; No. 3 Gaon Weibo Chart; No. 20 Gaon Album - Monthly Chart
2015	孫祖君Kris	地心引力 Gravity	Co-producer, Co-writer (music) ("地心引力")	The Place Media
2015	History	Blue Spring	Co-producer, Co-writer ("Hello")	LOEN Entertainment; No. 16 Gaon Album Chart
2015	History	Beyond The History	Co-producer, Co-writer ("Mind Game")	LOEN Entertainment; No. 8 Gaon Album Chart
2015	Speed	Speed On	Co-producer, Co-writer ("What U")	MBK Entertainment
2015	Chad Future	The 2nd Mini Album	Producer, Writer (music) ("Famous feat. HOTSHOT Sungwoon")	Vendetta
2016	Adventure Club	Red // Blue	Co-producer, Co-writer ("Save Me")	BMG Rights Management; Sony Music; No. 50 US Billboard Album Chart; No. 2 iTunes Dance Chart; No. 4 Dance/Electronic Billboard Chart; No. 33 Independent Billboard Album Chart
2016	Uniq	Uniq - Japanese Debut	Producer, Co-writer ("Falling In Love" Japanese Version); Producer, Co-writer ("Listen To Me" Japanese Version)	Yuehua Entertainment
2016	Bada	Mask Singer 62th (Live Version)	Co-writer ("으르렁 (Growl) (나의 사랑 나의 신부)")	MBC; YG PLUS
2017	Niel of Teen Top	Love Affair	Co-producer, Co-writer, Engineering ("Fever")	TOP Media; No. 3 Gaon Chart National Physical Albums; No. 8 M Countdown K-Pop Music Chart
2017	HALO	Here I Am	Co-producer, Co-writer ("Flying")	No. 7 Mnet M Chart
2017	Cosmic Girls	"Kiss Me"	Producer, Co-writer ("Kiss Me")	Starship Entertainment; Yuehua Entertainment
2018	Super Junior-D&E	Can I Stay... Digital Single	Producer, Co-writer ("Can I Stay...")	SM Entertainment; Label SJ; Avex Trax
2018	A.C.E	Adventures in Wonderland	Co-producer, Co-writer ("Take Me Higher")	No. 15 Billboard World Albums; No. 7 Mwave Music Chart; No. 6 Gaon Album Chart
2018	Super Junior-D&E	Style	Producer, Co-writer ("Can I Stay...")	SM Entertainment; No. 4 Oricon Chart
2019	UNINE	UNLOCK	Producer, Co-writer ("Like A Gentleman")	iQiyi; QQ Music sales of 636,156+
2019	TXT	The Dream Chapter: MAGIC	Producer, Co-writer ("20cm")	Big Hit Entertainment; No. 1 iTunes Top Albums in 44 regions (United States, Russia, Brazil, Spain, Hong Kong, Taiwan, Mexico, Norway, Saudi Arabia, India, Singapore and more). No. 1 Gaon Album Chat; No. 3 Billboard World Albums; No. 1 iTunes K-Pop Albums; No. 3 Heatseeker's Album Chart; No. 18 Billboard World Digital Songs Chart; No. 22 ARIA Digital Album Chart
2019	A.C.E	Under Cover: The Mad Squad	Co-producer, Co-writer ("Take Me Higher (Complete Ver.)")	Beat Interactive; No. 21 iTunes Top Albums (United States, United Kingdom, Germany, Italy, Canada and Australia).
2019	Exo-CBX	Magical Circus 2019 - Special Edition	Co-producer, Co-writer ("Don't Go - Magical Circus 2019 - Special Edition")	SM Entertainment Japan; Avex Music Creative
2019	Justin Huang	請撥打我的電話please - Single	Producer, Co-writer ("請撥打我的電話please")	Yuehua Entertainment
2022	LOONA, Kep1er	<Queendom2> Position Unit Battle Part.1-1	Producer, Co-writer ("Don't Go – Queendom2 Version")	CJ E&M; SM Entertainment
2023	Seoul Philharmonic Orchestra	Growl (Orchestra Version) – Single]	Co-writer ("으르렁 (Growl) (Orchestra Ver.)")	SM Entertainment; SM Classics
2024	Jinho	CHO:RD	Co-producer, Co-writer "Over"	Cube Entertainment
2024	NOMAD	Call Me Back	Producer, Co-writer, Engineering and Background Vocalist "Call Me Back"	Kakao Entertainment; Nomad Entertainment; No. 13 Circle Album Chart. No. 33 Soompi Music Chart; No. 95 Hanteo Chart
2025	SM Classics	1st Digital Album & Film - Across The New World	Co-writer ("으르렁 (Growl) (Orchestra Ver.)")	SM Entertainment; SM Classics
2025	SM Jazz Trio	Pink Note	Co-writer ("Growl - Jazz Version")	SM Entertainment; SM Classics
