= Growl (song) =

2013 single by Exo

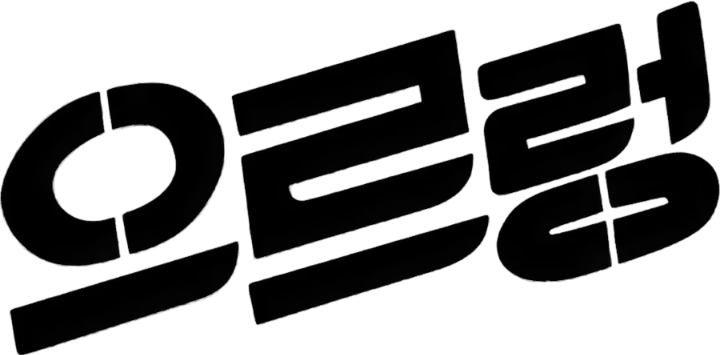

Single by Exo

from the album Growl
- Language: Korean; Mandarin
- Released: August 5, 2013
- Recorded: 2013
- Studio: SM Blue Cup (Seoul); InGrid (Seoul); Sound Pool (Seoul)
- Genre: R&B
- Length: 3:27
- Label: SM; KT Music
- Composers: Hyuk Shin; DK; Jordan Kyle; John Major; Jarah Gibson
- Lyricists: Seo Ji-eum; Wang Yajun

Exo Korean and Chinese singles chronology
"Wolf" (2013)	"Growl" (2013)	"Miracles in December" (2013)

Music videos
- "Growl" (Korean version) on YouTube
- "Growl" (Chinese version) on YouTube

"Growl" (Korean: 으르렁; RR: Eureureong; Chinese: 咆哮; pinyin: Páoxiào) is a song recorded by South Korean–Chinese boy band Exo, released on August 5, 2013, for the repackaged edition of their first studio album XOXO. It was released in both Korean and Chinese versions by their label SM Entertainment. The song is known as Exo's breakthrough single, with over two million downloads in South Korea.

== Release and promotion ==
Composed by Hyuk Shin, DK, Jordan Kyle, John Major and Jarah Gibson, "Growl" is described as a dance-pop song with contemporary R&B and funk influences. After its release was announced, a video filming the group practicing the song's choreography was leaked online on July 27. Exo began performing the song on South Korean music TV shows on August 1 before it was officially released together with the album on August 5, 2013. They also performed the song on several Chinese TV shows.

The song was performed during the closing ceremony for the 2018 Winter Olympics in Pyeongchang, along with their 2017 song "Power".

== Music videos ==
The Korean and Chinese music videos for "Growl" were released on August 1, 2013, four days ahead of the song itself. They exclusively feature Exo's performance of the song at a dimly lit warehouse and utilized the one shot style, appearing to have been filmed in a single take. Another set of music videos for the song, filmed at a different location, were released on August 20, 2013. On May 29, 2019, the Korean music video surpassed 200 million views on YouTube, becoming their fourth music video to do so.

== Reception ==
=== Music charts ===
"Growl" reached number 2 on South Korea's Gaon Digital Chart, as well as number 3 on the Billboard Korea K-Pop Hot 100 and World Digital Songs charts. Billboard listed "Growl" as the fifth best-selling K-pop song in America during 2013. The song also won first place 14 times in total on South Korean music TV shows.

Describing it as "the crown jewel in EXO's fantastic 2013", Billboard picked "Growl" as the best K-pop song of 2013. It was named Song of the Year at the 2013 Melon Music Awards and KBS Song Festival. The song is Exo's best-selling single to date, having accumulated over two million downloads.

=== Public reception ===
In July 2017, defectors from North Korea stated Exo has some popularity in North Korea, although people have to listen to them in secret and don't know what the members look like, and Growl in particular is used as a confession song amongst youth to confess to one's crush due to the lyrics.

"Growl" on critic lists
Publication	Year	List	Rank	Ref.
Billboard	2013	The 20 Best K-pop Songs of 2013	1	
Billboard	2018	The 100 Greatest Boy Band Songs of All Time	58	
Billboard	2019	The 100 Greatest K-pop Songs of the 2010s	50	
British GQ	2019	Best K-pop songs of the decade	No order	
Dazed	2013	Top 10 K-pop Songs of 2013	2	
The Dong-a Ilbo	2016	Best Male Idol Songs in the Past 20 Years	3	
The Forty-Five	2023	The 45 best K-pop songs of all-time (Rhian Daly)	29	
Melon	2021	Top 100 K-pop Songs of All Time	2	
Munhwa Ilbo	2019	10 best K-pop songs of the decade (Kim In-goo)	No order	
Rolling Stone	2023	100 Greatest Songs in the History of Korean Pop Music	34	
SBS PopAsia	2013	Top 100 Asian pop songs of 2013	1	

== Accolades ==
Awards and nominations for "Growl"
Organization	Year	Award	Result	Ref.
Golden Disc Awards	2014	Digital Bonsang	Nominated	
Hito Music Awards	2014	Best J-pop & K-pop Song	Won	
KBS Song Festival	2013	Song of the Year	Won	
Korean Music Awards	2013	Song of the Year	Nominated	
Korean Music Awards	2013	Best Dance & Electronic Song	Won	
Melon Music Awards	2013	Song of the Year	Won	
Melon Music Awards	2013	Music Video Award	Nominated	
Mnet Asian Music Awards	2013	Best Dance Performance – Male Group	Nominated	
Seoul Music Awards	2014	Best Song	Won	
World Music Awards	2014	World's Best Song	Won	

Music program awards (14 total)
Program	Date	Ref.
Music Bank	August 16, 2013	
Music Bank	August 23, 2013	
Inkigayo	August 18, 2013	
Inkigayo	August 25, 2013	
Inkigayo	September 1, 2013	
Show Champion	August 21, 2013	
Show Champion	August 28, 2013	
Show Champion	September 4, 2013	
M Countdown	August 22, 2013	
M Countdown	August 29, 2013	
M Countdown	September 5, 2013	
Show! Music Core	August 24, 2013	
Show! Music Core	August 31, 2013	
Show! Music Core	September 7, 2013	

== Cover ==
On November 10, 2025, SM Jazz Trio of SM Classics, released a jazz cover of "Growl" for their debut studio album, Pink Note.

== Charts ==
=== Weekly charts ===
Chart (2013)	Peak position
South Korea (Gaon)	2
South Korea (K-pop Hot 100)	3
US World Digital Songs (Billboard)	3

=== Year-end charts ===
Chart (2013)	Position
South Korea (Gaon)	56
South Korea (K-pop Hot 100)	19
US World Digital Songs (Billboard)	14

== Sales ==
Region	Sales
South Korea (digital)	2,023,254

== Credits and personnel ==
Credits adapted from the album's liner notes.

Studio

- SM Blue Cup Studio – recording, mixing
- In Grid Studio – recording
- Sound Pool Studios – recording
- Sonic Korea – mastering

Personnel

- SM Entertainment – executive producer
- Kim Young-min – executive supervisor
- Lee Soo-man – producer
- Exo – vocals
  - Baekhyun – background vocals
  - Chanyeol – background vocals
  - Chen – background vocals
  - D.O. – background vocals
  - Suho – background vocals
  - Tao – background vocals
- Seo Ji-eum – Korean lyrics
- Wang Yajun – Mandarin lyrics
- Hyuk Shin – composition, arranger, vocal directing
- DK – composition
- Jordan Kyle – composition, arranger
- John Major – composition, arranger
- Jarah Gibson – composition
- Kim Jin-hwan – vocal directing
- Jeong Eul-seok – recording, mixing
- Jeong Eun-kyung – recording
- Kim Ji-eun – recording
- Jeong Ho-jin – recording
- Lee Yoon-ji – bass
- Cheon Hoon – mastering

== Release history ==
Release history for "Growl"
Region	Date	Format	Label
Various	August 5, 2013	Digital download; streaming	SM; KT Music
