= Phrased Differently =

Music production and publishing company

Phrased Differently logo

Phrased Differently is an independent music publishing, production and artist development company founded in 2006, by former Universal Records executive and songwriter Hiten Bharadia. Their offices in Shoreditch, East London, are also home to seven underground recording studios, which are occupied by their signed writers including Bharadia, Philippe-Marc Anquetil, Knightstarr, Andreas Moe, Nathan Duvall (Disciples), Maegan Cottone, Michael Stockwell, Raphaella, Sky Adams, Commands, Mark Vallance, Dimitri Elrlich, and Phoebe Jo Brown. The company has managed over 1000 song placements since its inception, including 81 No. 1's, 306 Top 10 records, 30 Platinum Records and 31 Gold records around the world. To date, they have worked with artists such as Calvin Harris, Miley Cyrus, Jessie J, Iggy Azalea, Britney Spears, Olly Murs, Demi Lovato, Selena Gomez, Robin Schulz, Hardwell, Fleur East, Gorgen City, Omi, Miss Montreal, Tinie Tempah, Little Mix, Craig David, Lemar, Kelly Rowland, The Overtones, Lawson, Afrojack, You Me At Six, Allstar Weekend, Kumi Koda, Nora Van Elken, Toho Shinki, Sarah Connor, Namie Amuro, Cover Drive, Shinee, Avicii, John De Sohn and Tiesto. In 2011, Phrased Differently won its first BMI Pop Award for over 200,000 US radio spins on Miley Cyrus' "Can't Be Tamed".

== Signed writers ==
- Sky Adams
- Philippe-Marc Anquetil
- Hiten Bharadia
- Bhavik Pattani
- David Bjork
- Phoebe Jo Brown
- Commands
- Maegan Cottone
- DASA
- Nathan Duvall
- Dimitri Ehrlich
- Ki Fitzgerald
- Justin Jesso
- Knightstarr
- Lawrie Martin
- Sam Merifield
- Andreas Moe
- Raphaella
- Jordan Shaw
- Will Simms
- Michael Stockwell
- Tali Kouchner
- Hannah Wilson
- Mark Vallance

== International releases ==
=== Singles ===
Writers	Artist	Title	Peak chart position	Sales awards	Territory	Album	
2015
Nathan Duvall	Calvin Harris & Disciples	How Deep Is Your Love	1	Platinum	Australia	-	
Nathan Duvall	Calvin Harris & Disciples	How Deep Is Your Love	1	Gold	Belgium (Wallonia)	-	
Nathan Duvall	Calvin Harris & Disciples	How Deep Is Your Love	1	-	Greece	-	
Nathan Duvall	Calvin Harris & Disciples	How Deep Is Your Love	1	-	Israel	-	
Nathan Duvall	Calvin Harris & Disciples	How Deep Is Your Love	1	-	Holland	-	
Nathan Duvall	Calvin Harris & Disciples	How Deep Is Your Love	1	-	Russia	-	
Nathan Duvall	Calvin Harris & Disciples	How Deep Is Your Love	2	Gold	Belgium (Flanders)	-	
Nathan Duvall	Calvin Harris & Disciples	How Deep Is Your Love	2	-	France	-	
Nathan Duvall	Calvin Harris & Disciples	How Deep Is Your Love	2	-	Ireland	-	
Nathan Duvall	Calvin Harris & Disciples	How Deep Is Your Love	2	Platinum	New Zealand	-	
Nathan Duvall	Calvin Harris & Disciples	How Deep Is Your Love	2	-	Scotland	-	
Nathan Duvall	Calvin Harris & Disciples	How Deep Is Your Love	2	Platinum	UK	-	
Nathan Duvall	Calvin Harris & Disciples	How Deep Is Your Love	3	-	Hungary	-	
Nathan Duvall	Calvin Harris & Disciples	How Deep Is Your Love	3	-	Spain	-	
Nathan Duvall	Calvin Harris & Disciples	How Deep Is Your Love	4	-	Finland	-	
Nathan Duvall	Calvin Harris & Disciples	How Deep Is Your Love	4	-	Germany	-	
Nathan Duvall	Calvin Harris & Disciples	How Deep Is Your Love	4	-	Poland	-	
Nathan Duvall	Calvin Harris & Disciples	How Deep Is Your Love	4	-	South Africa	-	
Nathan Duvall	Calvin Harris & Disciples	How Deep Is Your Love	4	-	Switzerland	-	
Nathan Duvall	Calvin Harris & Disciples	How Deep Is Your Love	4	-	Austria	-	
Nathan Duvall	Calvin Harris & Disciples	How Deep Is Your Love	5	-	Denmark	-	
Nathan Duvall	Calvin Harris & Disciples	How Deep Is Your Love	5	-	Lebanon	-	
Nathan Duvall	Calvin Harris & Disciples	How Deep Is Your Love	6	-	Sweden	-	
Nathan Duvall	Calvin Harris & Disciples	How Deep Is Your Love	9	-	Norway	-	
Nathan Duvall	Calvin Harris & Disciples	How Deep Is Your Love	10	-	Italy	-	
Nathan Duvall	Calvin Harris & Disciples	How Deep Is Your Love	16	-	Canada	-	
Nathan Duvall	Calvin Harris & Disciples	How Deep Is Your Love	27	Gold	US	-	
Maegan Cottone	Britney Spears feat. Iggy Azalea	Pretty Girls	1	-	Belgium (Flanders)	-	
Maegan Cottone	Britney Spears feat. Iggy Azalea	Pretty Girls	1	-	Israel	-	
Maegan Cottone	Britney Spears feat. Iggy Azalea	Pretty Girls	5	-	Spain	-	
Maegan Cottone	Britney Spears feat. Iggy Azalea	Pretty Girls	5	-	Sweden	-	
Maegan Cottone	Britney Spears feat. Iggy Azalea	Pretty Girls	6	-	Greece	-	
Maegan Cottone	Britney Spears feat. Iggy Azalea	Pretty Girls	10	-	Scotland	-	
Maegan Cottone	Britney Spears feat. Iggy Azalea	Pretty Girls	11	-	Hungary	-	
Maegan Cottone	Britney Spears feat. Iggy Azalea	Pretty Girls	16	-	Canada	-	
Maegan Cottone	Britney Spears feat. Iggy Azalea	Pretty Girls	16	-	Finland	-	
Maegan Cottone	Britney Spears feat. Iggy Azalea	Pretty Girls	16	-	Lebanon	-	
Maegan Cottone	Britney Spears feat. Iggy Azalea	Pretty Girls	16	-	UK	-	
Maegan Cottone	Britney Spears feat. Iggy Azalea	Pretty Girls	18	-	Korea	-	
Maegan Cottone	Britney Spears feat. Iggy Azalea	Pretty Girls	25	-	France	-	
Maegan Cottone	Britney Spears feat. Iggy Azalea	Pretty Girls	27	-	Australia	-	
Maegan Cottone	Britney Spears feat. Iggy Azalea	Pretty Girls	29	-	US	-	
Nathan Duvall	Disciples	They Don't Know	24	-	UK	-	
2014
Maegan Cottone	Little Mix	Salute	5	-	UK	Salute	
Maegan Cottone	Little Mix	Salute	5	-	Scotland	Salute	
Maegan Cottone	Little Mix	Salute	12	-	Ireland	Salute	
Hiten Bharadia; Maria Marcus	Angela Chang	Wo De Yan Lei	1	-	Taiwan	Angela Zhang	
Michael Stockwell	Donghae & Eunhyuk (Super Junior)	Ten Years	3	-	Japan	Ride Me	
2013
Hiten Bharadia; Michael Stockwell	The Voice of Holland	Christmas Hearts	17	-	Holland	-	
Nathan Duvall; Maegan Cottone	Little Mix	Move	2	Gold	Scotland	Salute	
Nathan Duvall; Maegan Cottone	Little Mix	Move	3	Silver	UK	Salute	
Nathan Duvall; Maegan Cottone	Little Mix	Move	5	-	Ireland	Salute	
Nathan Duvall; Maegan Cottone	Little Mix	Move	10	-	Belgium	Salute	
Nathan Duvall; Maegan Cottone	Little Mix	Move	12	-	New Zealand	Salute	
Andreas Moe	John De Sohn feat. Andreas Moe	Under The Sun	19	-	Sweden	-	
Hiten Bharadia; Raphaella Mazaheri-Asadi	Leona Philippo	With A Word	17	-	Holland	-	
Andreas Moe	John De Sohn feat. Kristin Amparo	Dance Our Tears Away	1	Platinum	Sweden	-	
2012
Bhavik Pattani; William Henry	Alexxa	Make It Work	2	-	Brazil	-	
Andreas Moe	Nick & Simon	Alles Overwinnen	1	-	Holland	-	
Andreas Moe	John De Sohn feat. Andreas Moe	Long Time	6	-	US	-	
Andreas Moe	Chris Hordijk	Won't You Stay	6	-	Holland	-	
Andreas Moe	Silke Mastboom	Awake	2	-	Belgium	-	
2011
Hiten Bharadia	Voice of Holland	1000 Voices	1	-	Holland	-	
Nathan Duvall	Shary Ann	Six Feet Under	9	-	Holland	-	
Philippe-Marc Anquetil	Leonie Meijers	Lost In Yesterday	3	-	Holland	-	
Hiten Bharadia	Ben Saunders	Kill For a Broken Heart	1	-	Holland	-	
Ben Onono; Frank Hamilton	Kim De Boer	Change	4	-	Holland	-	
2010
Philippe-Marc Anquetil	Tinie Tempah	Invincible	5	-	New Zealand	Disc-Overy	
Philippe-Marc Anquetil	Tinie Tempah	Invincible	11	Silver	UK	Disc-Overy	
Philippe-Marc Anquetil	Tinie Tempah	Invincible	13	-	Ireland	Disc-Overy	
Marek Pompetzki; Paul NZA		Miley Cyrus	Can't Be Tamed	5	-	Ireland	Can't Be Tamed
Marek Pompetzki; Paul NZA	5	Miley Cyrus	Can't Be Tamed	-	New Zealand		Can't Be Tamed
Marek Pompetzki; Paul NZA	6	Miley Cyrus	Can't Be Tamed	-	Canada		Can't Be Tamed
Marek Pompetzki; Paul NZA	8	Miley Cyrus	Can't Be Tamed	-	US		Can't Be Tamed
Marek Pompetzki; Paul NZA	12	Miley Cyrus	Can't Be Tamed	-	Japan		Can't Be Tamed
Marek Pompetzki; Paul NZA	13	Miley Cyrus	Can't Be Tamed	-	UK		Can't Be Tamed
Marek Pompetzki; Paul NZA	14	Miley Cyrus	Can't Be Tamed	-	Australia		Can't Be Tamed
Marek Pompetzki; Paul NZA	14	Miley Cyrus	Can't Be Tamed	-	Spain		Can't Be Tamed
Marek Pompetzki; Paul NZA	15	Miley Cyrus	Can't Be Tamed	-	France		Can't Be Tamed
Marek Pompetzki; Paul NZA	16	Miley Cyrus	Can't Be Tamed	-	Norway		Can't Be Tamed
Marek Pompetzki; Paul NZA	21	Miley Cyrus	Can't Be Tamed	-	Austria		Can't Be Tamed
2009
Hiten Bharadia; Philippe-Marc Anquetil; Christopher-Lee Joe	Tata Young	Mission Is You	1	Gold	Japan	-	
Philippe-Marc Anquetil; Christopher-Lee Joe	Nana Tanimura	Girls Wanna Be	15	-	Japan	-	
Cliff Masterson	Mai	Dreaming Out Loud	18	-	Holland	-	
Philippe-Marc Anquetil; Christopher-Lee Joe	Abby	Boys	20	-	Holland	-	
Anna-Maria La Spina; Dan Gautreau	Anna Tsuchiya	Loser	13	-	Japan	-	
Iain James	Toho Shinki	Survivor	3	Gold	Japan	-	
2008
Philippe-Marc Anquetil; Christopher-Lee Joe; Danny Latouff	W-inds	Leave Me Alone	7	-	Japan	Single - Ame-Ato	
Philippe-Marc Anquetil; Christopher-Lee Joe	Leah Dizon	Love Paradox	15	-	Japan	-	
Philippe-Marc Anquetil; Christopher-Lee Joe; Marcus John	Toho Shinki	Crazy Life	9	-	Japan	Single - Close to You	
Philippe-Marc Anquetil; Iain James	Toho Shinki	Box In The Ship	1	Gold	Japan	Single - Doushite Kimiwo Sukini	
2007
Philippe-Marc Anquetil; Christopher-Lee Joe	W-inds	Shining Star	4	-	Japan	Single - Love Is The Greatest Thing	
Philippe-Marc Anquetil; Christopher-Lee Joe	W-inds	I Am A Man	10	-	Japan	Single - Beautiful Life	
Philippe-Marc Anquetil; Christopher-Lee Joe	W-inds	Space Drifter	10	-	Japan	Single - Beautiful Life	
Philippe-Marc Anquetil; Christopher-Lee Joe; Iain James	Toho Shinki	Ride On	2	-	Japan	-	
Hiten Bharadia; Philippe-Marc Anquetil; Christopher-Lee Joe	Kumi Koda	Run For Your Life	1	Platinum	Japan	Double A Side Single with "Freaky"	
2006
Hiten Bharadia; Philippe-Marc Anquetil; Christopher-Lee Joe	Tata Young	El Nin-Yo	9	-	Japan	Temperature Rising	
Philippe-Marc Anquetil; Christopher-Lee Joe	Tamara	Ohh Ahh (Pepsi Song)	12	-	Australia	-	
Philippe-Marc Anquetil; Christopher-Lee Joe	Tamara Jaber	Hard For Me	15	-	Australia	-	

=== Albums ===
Writers	Artist	Album	Track	Peak chart position	Territory	Sales awards
2015
Nathan Duvall; Maegan Cottone	Little Mix	Get Weird	A.D.I.D.A.S	1	Ireland	-
Nathan Duvall; Maegan Cottone	Little Mix	Get Weird	A.D.I.D.A.S	2	Australia	-
Nathan Duvall; Maegan Cottone	Little Mix	Get Weird	A.D.I.D.A.S	2	Scotland	-
Nathan Duvall; Maegan Cottone	Little Mix	Get Weird	A.D.I.D.A.S	2	UK	Silver
Nathan Duvall; Maegan Cottone	Little Mix	Get Weird	A.D.I.D.A.S	8	New Zealand	-
Nathan Duvall; Maegan Cottone	Little Mix	Get Weird	A.D.I.D.A.S	9	Holland	-
Nathan Duvall; Maegan Cottone	Little Mix	Get Weird	A.D.I.D.A.S	12	Canada	-
Nathan Duvall; Maegan Cottone	Little Mix	Get Weird	A.D.I.D.A.S	12	Portugal	-
Nathan Duvall; Maegan Cottone	Little Mix	Get Weird	A.D.I.D.A.S	13	Sweden	-
Nathan Duvall; Maegan Cottone	Little Mix	Get Weird	A.D.I.D.A.S	13	US	-
Nathan Duvall; Maegan Cottone	Little Mix	Get Weird	A.D.I.D.A.S	15	Belgium (Flanders)	-
Nathan Duvall; Maegan Cottone	Little Mix	Get Weird	A.D.I.D.A.S	15	Spain	-
Nathan Duvall; Maegan Cottone	Little Mix	Get Weird	A.D.I.D.A.S	16	Austria	-
Nathan Duvall; Maegan Cottone	Little Mix	Get Weird	A.D.I.D.A.S	18	Switzerland	-
Nathan Duvall; Maegan Cottone	Little Mix	Get Weird	A.D.I.D.A.S	20	Italy	-
Nathan Duvall; Maegan Cottone	Little Mix	Get Weird	A.D.I.D.A.S	28	Norway	-
Nathan Duvall; Maegan Cottone	Little Mix	Get Weird	A.D.I.D.A.S	29	Germany	-
Maegan Cottone	Little Mix	Get Weird	Lightning	1	Ireland	-
Maegan Cottone	Little Mix	Get Weird	Lightning	2	Australia	-
Maegan Cottone	Little Mix	Get Weird	Lightning	2	Scotland	-
Maegan Cottone	Little Mix	Get Weird	Lightning	2	UK	Silver
Maegan Cottone	Little Mix	Get Weird	Lightning	8	New Zealand	-
Maegan Cottone	Little Mix	Get Weird	Lightning	9	Holland	-
Maegan Cottone	Little Mix	Get Weird	Lightning	12	Canada	-
Maegan Cottone	Little Mix	Get Weird	Lightning	12	Portugal	-
Maegan Cottone	Little Mix	Get Weird	Lightning	13	Sweden	-
Maegan Cottone	Little Mix	Get Weird	Lightning	13	US	-
Maegan Cottone	Little Mix	Get Weird	Lightning	15	Belgium (Flanders)	-
Maegan Cottone	Little Mix	Get Weird	Lightning	15	Spain	-
Maegan Cottone	Little Mix	Get Weird	Lightning	16	Austria	-
Maegan Cottone	Little Mix	Get Weird	Lightning	18	Switzerland	-
Maegan Cottone	Little Mix	Get Weird	Lightning	20	Italy	-
Maegan Cottone	Little Mix	Get Weird	Lightning	28	Norway	-
Maegan Cottone	Little Mix	Get Weird	Lightning	29	Germany	-
Maegan Cottone	Little Mix	Get Weird	OMG	1	Ireland	-
Maegan Cottone	Little Mix	Get Weird	OMG	2	Australia	-
Maegan Cottone	Little Mix	Get Weird	OMG	2	Scotland	-
Maegan Cottone	Little Mix	Get Weird	OMG	2	UK	Silver
Maegan Cottone	Little Mix	Get Weird	OMG	8	New Zealand	-
Maegan Cottone	Little Mix	Get Weird	OMG	9	Holland	-
Maegan Cottone	Little Mix	Get Weird	OMG	12	Canada	-
Maegan Cottone	Little Mix	Get Weird	OMG	12	Portugal	-
Maegan Cottone	Little Mix	Get Weird	OMG	13	Sweden	-
Maegan Cottone	Little Mix	Get Weird	OMG	13	US	-
Maegan Cottone	Little Mix	Get Weird	OMG	15	Belgium (Flanders)	-
Maegan Cottone	Little Mix	Get Weird	OMG	15	Spain	-
Maegan Cottone	Little Mix	Get Weird	OMG	16	Austria	-
Maegan Cottone	Little Mix	Get Weird	OMG	18	Switzerland	-
Maegan Cottone	Little Mix	Get Weird	OMG	20	Italy	-
Maegan Cottone	Little Mix	Get Weird	OMG	28	Norway	-
Maegan Cottone	Little Mix	Get Weird	OMG	29	Germany	-
Andreas Moe	Armin Van Buren	Embrace	Strong Ones	2	Holland	-
Iain James	Omi	Me 4 U	Me 4 U	9	Sweden	-
Iain James	Omi	Me 4 U	Me 4 U	18	Canada	-
Iain James	Omi	Me 4 U	Me 4 U	29	Denmark	-
Iain James; Nathan Duvall; Andreas Moe	Omi	Me 4 U	Sing It Out Loud	9	Sweden	-
Iain James; Nathan Duvall; Andreas Moe	Omi	Me 4 U	Sing It Out Loud	18	Canada	-
Iain James; Nathan Duvall; Andreas Moe	Omi	Me 4 U	Sing It Out Loud	29	Denmark	-
Andreas Moe	Nick & Simon	Open	Rome	1	Holland	-
Andreas Moe	Nick & Simon	Open	Rome	8	Belgium	-
Nathan Duvall	Robin Schulz	Sugar	Yellow	1	Switzerland	-
Nathan Duvall	Robin Schulz	Sugar	Yellow	3	Germany	-
Nathan Duvall	Robin Schulz	Sugar	Yellow	4	Austria	-
Nathan Duvall	Robin Schulz	Sugar	Yellow	8	Hungary	-
Nathan Duvall	Robin Schulz	Sugar	Yellow	10	Norway	-
Nathan Duvall	Robin Schulz	Sugar	Yellow	19	Sweden	-
Nathan Duvall	Robin Schulz	Sugar	Yellow	22	Italy	-
Nathan Duvall	Robin Schulz	Sugar	Yellow	23	Belgium (Wallonia)	-
Nathan Duvall	Robin Schulz	Sugar	Yellow	27	Belgium (Flanders)	-
Maegan Cottone; Sky Adams	Kumi Koda	Hurricane	Hurricane	7	Japan	-
Hiten Bharadia; Raphaella Mazaheri-Asadi; Bardur Haberg; Oli Jogvansson	Naime Amuro	Genic	It	1	Japan	-
Michael Stockwell; Barnaby Courtney	The Tenors	Angels Calling	Angels Calling	3	Canada	-
Philippe-Marc Anquetil; Bhavik Pattani; Christina Parie	Kumi Koda	Walk Of My Life	Lippy	1	Japan	-
Maegan Cottone	Kumi Koda	Walk Of My Life	Mercedes	1	Japan	-
Bardur Haberg	Kumi Koda	Walk Of My Life	Money In My Bag	1	Japan	-
Bhavik Pattani; William Henry; Maegan Cottone; Rick Smith	Kumi Koda	Walk Of My Life	Piece In The Puzzle	1	Japan	-
Philippe-Marc Anquetil	Kumi Koda	Walk Of My Life	House Party	1	Japan	-
Andreas Moe	Hardwell	United We Are	Colors	1	Holland	-
Andreas Moe	Hardwell	United We Are	Colors	4	Switzerland	-
Andreas Moe	Hardwell	United We Are	Colors	6	Austria	-
Andreas Moe	Hardwell	United We Are	Colors	9	Indonesia	-
Andreas Moe	Hardwell	United We Are	Colors	9	Korea	-
Andreas Moe	Hardwell	United We Are	Colors	11	Germany	-
Andreas Moe	Hardwell	United We Are	Colors	11	India	-
Andreas Moe	Hardwell	United We Are	Colors	11	Russia	-
Andreas Moe	Hardwell	United We Are	Colors	13	Belgium (Flanders)	-
Andreas Moe	Hardwell	United We Are	Colors	27	Belgium (Wallonia	-
Andreas Moe	Hardwell	United We Are	Colors	30	France	-
2014
Hiten Bharadia; Andreas Moe	Tiesto	A Town Called Paradise	Echoes	9	Canada	-
Hiten Bharadia; Andreas Moe	Tiesto	A Town Called Paradise	Echoes	11	Holland	-
Hiten Bharadia; Andreas Moe	Tiesto	A Town Called Paradise	Echoes	12	Switzerland	-
Hiten Bharadia; Andreas Moe	Tiesto	A Town Called Paradise	Echoes	15	Belgium	-
Hiten Bharadia; Andreas Moe	Tiesto	A Town Called Paradise	Echoes	18	US	-
Hiten Bharadia; Andreas Moe	Tiesto	A Town Called Paradise	Echoes	18	Australia	-
Hiten Bharadia; Andreas Moe	Tiesto	A Town Called Paradise	Echoes	18	Norway	-
Hiten Bharadia; Andreas Moe	Tiesto	A Town Called Paradise	Echoes	22	UK	-
Hiten Bharadia; Andreas Moe	Tiesto	A Town Called Paradise	Echoes	22	Ireland	-
Hiten Bharadia; Andreas Moe	Tiesto	A Town Called Paradise	Echoes	22	Austria	-
Hiten Bharadia; Andreas Moe	Tiesto	A Town Called Paradise	Echoes	22	Sweden	-
Hiten Bharadia; Raphaella Mazaheri-Asadi	Aneta Sablik	The One	Begin Again	11	Germany	-
Hiten Bharadia; Raphaella Mazaheri-Asadi	Aneta Sablik	The One	Begin Again	14	Austria	-
Hiten Bharadia; Raphaella Mazaheri-Asadi	Aneta Sablik	The One	Begin Again	25	Switzerland	-
Andreas Moe	Aneta Sablik	The One	Tell A Story	11	Germany	-
Andreas Moe	Aneta Sablik	The One	Tell A Story	14	Austria	-
Andreas Moe	Aneta Sablik	The One	Tell A Story	25	Switzerland	-
Hiten Bharadia; Raphaella Mazaheri-Asadi	EXO-K	Overdose	Thunder	1	Korea	-
Hiten Bharadia; Raphaella Mazaheri-Asadi	EXO-K	Overdose	Thunder	1	China	-
Hiten Bharadia; Raphaella Mazaheri-Asadi	EXO-K	Overdose	Thunder	3	Japan	-
Hiten Bharadia; Raphaella Mazaheri-Asadi	Ladies of Soul	Live At The Ziggo Dome	I'll Carry You	2	Holland	-
Philippe Marc-Anquetil	Juju	Door	Hero #51	2	Japan	-
Michael Stockwell	Donghae & Eunhyuk (Super Junior)	Ride Me	Ten Years	6	Japan	-
Maegan Cottone	Little Mix	Salute	Salute	6	US	-
Maegan Cottone	Little Mix	Salute	Salute	7	Canada	-
Maegan Cottone	Little Mix	Salute	Competition	6	US	-
Maegan Cottone	Little Mix	Salute	Competition	7	Canada	-
Maegan Cottone; Nathan Duvall	Little Mix	Salute	Move	6	US	-
Maegan Cottone; Nathan Duvall	Little Mix	Salute	Move	7	Canada	-
Philippe-Marc Anquetil	Yoann Freget	Quelques Heures Avec Moi	Love	4	France	-
2013
Andreas Moe	Boyzone	BZ20	Who We Are	5	UK	-
Nathan Duvall; Maegan Cottone	Little Mix	Salute	Move	4	Australia	-
Nathan Duvall; Maegan Cottone	Little Mix	Salute	Move	4	UK	Gold
Nathan Duvall; Maegan Cottone	Little Mix	Salute	Move	5	Scotland	-
Nathan Duvall; Maegan Cottone	Little Mix	Salute	Move	7	Ireland	-
Nathan Duvall; Maegan Cottone	Little Mix	Salute	Move	11	New Zealand	-
Nathan Duvall; Maegan Cottone	Little Mix	Salute	Move	17	Spain	-
Nathan Duvall; Maegan Cottone	Little Mix	Salute	Move	19	Norway	-
Nathan Duvall; Maegan Cottone	Little Mix	Salute	Move	20	Croatia	-
Nathan Duvall; Maegan Cottone	Little Mix	Salute	Move	21	Italy	-
Maegan Cottone	Little Mix	Salute	Salute	4	Australia	-
Maegan Cottone	Little Mix	Salute	Salute	4	UK	Gold
Maegan Cottone	Little Mix	Salute	Salute	5	Scotland	-
Maegan Cottone	Little Mix	Salute	Salute	7	Ireland	-
Maegan Cottone	Little Mix	Salute	Salute	11	New Zealand	-
Maegan Cottone	Little Mix	Salute	Salute	17	Spain	-
Maegan Cottone	Little Mix	Salute	Salute	19	Norway	-
Maegan Cottone	Little Mix	Salute	Salute	20	Croatia	-
Maegan Cottone	Little Mix	Salute	Salute	21	Italy	-
Paulo Mendonca	Kahi	Who Are You?	Sinister	13	Korea	-
Hiten Bharadia	Chenoa	Otra Direccion	Arrested	5	Spain	-
Bhavik Pattani; William Henry	Chenoa	Otra Direccion	Borderline	5	Spain	-
Hiten Bharadia; Raphaella Mazaheri-Asadi; Bhavik Pattani; William Henry	Chenoa	Otra Direccion	Dead In The Water	5	Spain	-
Hiten Bharadia; Raphaella Mazaheri-Asadi; Bhavik Pattani; William Henry	Chenoa	Otra Direccion	Drama	5	Spain	-
Hiten Bharadia; Raphaella Mazaheri-Asadi; Bhavik Pattani; William Henry	Chenoa	Otra Direccion	Drama (Duet)	5	Spain	-
Hiten Bharadia; Raphaella Mazaheri-Asadi	Chenoa	Otra Direccion	Follow The Sun	5	Spain	-
Hiten Bharadia	Chenoa	Otra Direccion	Humanized	5	Spain	-
Hiten Bharadia	Chenoa	Otra Direccion	Jurame	5	Spain	-
Hiten Bharadia; Bhavik Pattani; William Henry	Chenoa	Otra Direccion	Life's An Equation	5	Spain	-
Hiten Bharadia; Andreas Moe	Chenoa	Otra Direccion	Llegare Hasta El Final	5	Spain	-
Hiten Bharadia; Andreas Moe	Chenoa	Otra Direccion	Made That Way	5	Spain	-
Hiten Bharadia; Bhavik Pattani; William Henry	Chenoa	Otra Direccion	Ni Un Minuto Mas	5	Spain	-
Hiten Bharadia; Bhavik Pattani; William Henry	Chenoa	Otra Direccion	Quinta Dimension	5	Spain	-
Bhavik Pattani; William Henry	Chenoa	Otra Direccion	Super Superficial	5	Spain	-
Hiten Bharadia; Bhavik Pattani; William Henry	Chenoa	Otra Direccion	X-Ray Eyes	5	Spain	-
Hiten Bharadia	Chenoa	Otra Direccion	Ya No Quiero Verte	5	Spain	-
Hiten Bharadia; Andreas Moe	Shinee	Boy Meets U	Password	2	Japan	-
Andreas Moe	John De Sohn feat. Andreas Moe	Absolute Summer Hits	Under The Sun	1	Sweden	-
Philippe-Marc Anquetil	Little Mix	DNA	Make You Believe	4	Canada	-
Philippe-Marc Anquetil	Little Mix	DNA	Make You Believe	4	US	-
Philippe-Marc Anquetil; Christopher Lee-Joe; Iain James; Mika Paavola	Shinee	Music Box	Music Box Orgel	1	Korea	-
Philippe-Marc Anquetil; Christopher Lee-Joe; Iain James; Mika Paavola	Shinee	Music Box	Music Box Orgel	1	US	-
Philippe-Marc Anquetil; Christopher Lee-Joe; Iain James; Mika Paavola	Shinee	Music Box	Music Box Orgel	2	Taiwan	-
Philippe-Marc Anquetil; Christopher Lee-Joe; Iain James; Mika Paavola	Shinee	Music Box	Music Box Orgel	11	Hong Kong	-
Andreas Moe	Luca Hanni	Living The Dream	Hollywood Sky	1	Switzerland	-
Andreas Moe	Luca Hanni	Living The Dream	Hollywood Sky	8	Austria	-
Philippe-Marc Anquetil	Daniele Negroni	Bulletproof	Bullet Proof	5	Austria	-
Philippe-Marc Anquetil	Daniele Negroni	Bulletproof	Bullet Proof	7	Germany	-
Hiten Bharadia; Philippe-Marc Anquetil; Andreas Moe	Daniele Negroni	Bulletproof	Hold On My Heart	5	Austria	-
Hiten Bharadia; Philippe-Marc Anquetil; Andreas Moe	Daniele Negroni	Bulletproof	Hold On My Heart	7	Germany	-
Andreas Moe	Daniele Negroni	Bulletproof	Hold On My Heart	5	Austria	-
Andreas Moe	Daniele Negroni	Bulletproof	Hold On My Heart	7	Germany	-
Bhavik Pattani; William Henry	Daniele Negroni	Bulletproof	Walking On Water	5	Austria	-
Bhavik Pattani; William Henry	Daniele Negroni	Bulletproof	Walking On Water	7	Germany	-
Andreas Moe	Daniele Negroni	Bulletproof	Who's That Girl?	5	Austria	-
Andreas Moe	Daniele Negroni	Bulletproof	Who's That Girl?	7	Germany	-
Bhavik Pattani; William Henry; Raphaella Mazaheri-Asadi	Nabiha	Mind The Gap	Kill It With Love	1	Denmark	-
Hiten Bharadia; Nathan Duvall	Kumi Koda	Driving Hits 5	At The Weekend	11	Japan	-
Hiten Bharadia	The Canadian Tenors	Lead With Your Heart	World Stands Still	21	US	-
Hiten Bharadia; Philippe-Marc Anquetil; Bardur Haberg	Ayumi Hamasaki	Love Again	Wake Me Up	1	Japan	-
2012
Hiten Bharadia; Philippe-Marc Anquetil; Bardur Haberg	Ayumi Hamasaki	Again	Wake Me Up	7	Japan	-
Hiten Bharadia; Philippe-Marc Anquetil; Bardur Haberg	Ayumi Hamasaki	Again	Wake Me Up (Remix)	7	Japan	-
Hiten Bharadia; Philippe-Marc Anquetil; Bardur Haberg	Ayumi Hamasaki	Again	Wake Me Up (Instrumental)	7	Japan	-
Philippe-Marc Anquetil	Little Mix	DNA	Make You Believe	2	Czech Republic	-
Philippe-Marc Anquetil	Little Mix	DNA	Make You Believe	3	Ireland	-
Philippe-Marc Anquetil	Little Mix	DNA	Make You Believe	3	UK	-
Philippe-Marc Anquetil	Little Mix	DNA	Make You Believe	5	Italy	-
Philippe-Marc Anquetil	Little Mix	DNA	Make You Believe	5	Norway	-
Philippe-Marc Anquetil	Little Mix	DNA	Make You Believe	5	Scotland	-
Philippe-Marc Anquetil	Little Mix	DNA	Make You Believe	10	Australia	Gold
Philippe-Marc Anquetil	Little Mix	DNA	Make You Believe	13	Denmark	-
Philippe-Marc Anquetil	Little Mix	DNA	Make You Believe	14	New Zealand	-
Philippe-Marc Anquetil	Little Mix	DNA	Make You Believe	24	France	-
Maegan Cottone	Mark With A feat. Maegan Cottone	Fly	Fly	18	Belgium	-
Hiten Bharadia	Canadian Tenors	Lead With Your Heart	World Stand Still	3	Canada	Platinum
Andreas Moe	Nick & Simon	Sterker	Alles Overwinnen	1	Holland	-
Hiten Bharadia	Ben Saunders	Heart & Soul	Judge Me	7	Holland	-
Bardur Haberg; Olu Jogvansson	Iris Kroes	Iris Kroes	A New Low	4	Holland	-
Maegan Cottone	Jean Roch	Music Saved My Life	8 Days a Week	8	France	Platinum
Andreas Moe	DJ Tiesto	Club Life Vol, 2 - Miami	Long Time	3	Switzerland	-
Andreas Moe	DJ Tiesto	Club Life Vol, 2 - Miami	Long Time	6	UK	-
Andreas Moe	DJ Tiesto	Club Life Vol, 2 - Miami	Long Time	7	Canada	-
Andreas Moe	DJ Tiesto	Club Life Vol, 2 - Miami	Long Time	8	Russia	-
Andreas Moe	DJ Tiesto	Club Life Vol, 2 - Miami	Long Time	9	Austria	-
Andreas Moe	DJ Tiesto	Club Life Vol, 2 - Miami	Long Time	16	US	-
Philippe-Marc Anquetil; Christopher Lee-Joe; Iain James	Shinee	Shinee	Alarm Clock	1	Korea	-
Raphaella Mazaheri-Asadi	Ivy Quainoo	Ivy Quainoo	Castles	5	Germany	Gold
Raphaella Mazaheri-Asadi	Ivy Quainoo	Ivy Quainoo	Castles	10	Switzerland	-
Raphaella Mazaheri-Asadi	Ivy Quainoo	Ivy Quainoo	Castles	11	Austria	-
2011
Hiten Bharadia; Iain James	The Overtones	Good Old Fashioned Love	Second Last Chance	4	UK	Platinum
Philippe-Marc Anquetil	Lenny Keylard	Jah Is The Remedy And Love Is The Cure	Love Brings Happiness	5	Holland	-
Gabriela Soza	Wonderland	Nothin' Moves Me Anymore	Nothin' Moves Me Anymore	8	UK	-
Marek Pompetzki; Paul NZA	Namie Amuro	Checkmate	Wonder Woman	1	Japan	Platinum
Marek Pompetzki; Paul NZA	Namie Amuro	Checkmate	Wonder Woman	11	Korea	-
Hiten Bharadia	Ben Saunders	You Should Know Me By Now	Kill For A Broken Heart	1	Holland	Platinum
Hiten Bharadia; Nathan Duvall	Kumi Koda	Déjà vu	At The Weekend	1	Japan	Platinum
Lili Reinisch	Lena	Good News	Teenage Girls	1	Germany	Platinum
Lili Reinisch	Lena	Good News	Teenage Girls	8	Austria	Gold
Lili Reinisch	Lena	Good News	Teenage Girls	15	Switzerland	Gold
2010
Hiten Bharadia; Philip Hochstrate; Emma Stakes	Sarah Connor	Real Love	Back From Your Love	8	Germany	-
Hiten Bharadia; Philip Hochstrate; Emma Stakes	Sarah Connor	Real Love	Back From Your Love	15	Austria	-
Hiten Bharadia; Philippe-Marc Anquetil	Sarah Connor	Real Love	In Love Alone	8	Germany	-
Hiten Bharadia; Philippe-Marc Anquetil	Sarah Connor	Real Love	In Love Alone	15	Austria	-
Hiten Bharadia	Sarah Connor	Real Love	Soldier With A Broken Heart	8	Germany	-
Hiten Bharadia	Sarah Connor	Real Love	Soldier With A Broken Heart	15	Austria	-
Hiten Bharadia; Bjorn Djupstrom	Sarah Connor	Real Love	Stand Up	8	Germany	-
Hiten Bharadia; Bjorn Djupstrom	Sarah Connor	Real Love	Stand Up	15	Austria	-
Hiten Bharadia; Philippe-Marc Anquetil; Christopher Lee-Joe	Sarah Connor	Real Love	This is What It Feels Like	8	Germany	-
Hiten Bharadia; Philippe-Marc Anquetil; Christopher Lee-Joe	Sarah Connor	Real Love	This is What It Feels Like	15	Austria	-
Hiten Bharadia; Philippe-Marc Anquetil; Christopher Lee-Joe	Sarah Connor	Real Love	Time To	8	Germany	-
Hiten Bharadia; Philippe-Marc Anquetil; Christopher Lee-Joe	Sarah Connor	Real Love	Time To	15	Austria	-
Hiten Bharadia; Philippe-Marc Anquetil; Christopher Lee-Joe	Sarah Connor	Real Love	Top of the World	8	Germany	-
Hiten Bharadia; Philippe-Marc Anquetil; Christopher Lee-Joe	Sarah Connor	Real Love	Top of the World	15	Austria	-
Philippe-Marc Anquetil	Tinie Tempah	Disc-Overy	Invincible	1	UK	2 x Platinum
Nathan Duvall	Infernal	Fall From Grace	Materialize	9	Denmark	-
Fredrik Bostrom; Anna Nordell	Anna Tsuchiya	Rule	Never Ever	18	Japan	-
Philippe-Marc Anquetil; Iain James	Toho Shinki	Complete Single A-Side Collection	Box In The Ship	1	Japan	Gold
Philippe-Marc Anquetil; Iain James; Marcus John	Toho Shinki	Complete Single A-Side Collection	Crazy Life	1	Japan	Gold
Philippe-Marc Antequil; Christopher Lee-Joe; Iain James	Toho Shinki	Complete Single A-Side Collection	Ride On	1	Japan	Gold
Iain James	Toho Shinki	Complete Single A-Side Collection	Survivor	1	Japan	Gold
Marek Pompetzki	Miley Cyrus	I Can't Be Tamed	Can't Be Tamed	1	Portugal	-
Marek Pompetzki	Miley Cyrus	I Can't Be Tamed	Can't Be Tamed	1	Spain	-
Marek Pompetzki	Miley Cyrus	I Can't Be Tamed	Can't Be Tamed	2	Austria	-
Marek Pompetzki	Miley Cyrus	I Can't Be Tamed	Can't Be Tamed	2	Canada	-
Marek Pompetzki	Miley Cyrus	I Can't Be Tamed	Can't Be Tamed	2	New Zealand	-
Marek Pompetzki	Miley Cyrus	I Can't Be Tamed	Can't Be Tamed	3	Greece	-
Marek Pompetzki	Miley Cyrus	I Can't Be Tamed	Can't Be Tamed	3	Switzerland	-
Marek Pompetzki	Miley Cyrus	I Can't Be Tamed	Can't Be Tamed	2	US	-
Marek Pompetzki	Miley Cyrus	I Can't Be Tamed	Can't Be Tamed	4	Australia	-
Marek Pompetzki	Miley Cyrus	I Can't Be Tamed	Can't Be Tamed	4	Germany	-
Marek Pompetzki	Miley Cyrus	I Can't Be Tamed	Can't Be Tamed	4	Italy	-
Marek Pompetzki	Miley Cyrus	I Can't Be Tamed	Can't Be Tamed	5	Ireland	-
Marek Pompetzki	Miley Cyrus	I Can't Be Tamed	Can't Be Tamed	7	Belgium (Wallonia)	-
Marek Pompetzki	Miley Cyrus	I Can't Be Tamed	Can't Be Tamed	8	Belgium (Flanders)	-
Marek Pompetzki	Miley Cyrus	I Can't Be Tamed	Can't Be Tamed	8	Czech Republic	-
Marek Pompetzki	Miley Cyrus	I Can't Be Tamed	Can't Be Tamed	8	Japan	-
Marek Pompetzki	Miley Cyrus	I Can't Be Tamed	Can't Be Tamed	8	Norway	-
Marek Pompetzki	Miley Cyrus	I Can't Be Tamed	Can't Be Tamed	8	UK	-
Marek Pompetzki	Miley Cyrus	I Can't Be Tamed	Can't Be Tamed	10	Hungary	-
Marek Pompetzki	Miley Cyrus	I Can't Be Tamed	Can't Be Tamed	10	Mexico	-
Marek Pompetzki	Miley Cyrus	I Can't Be Tamed	Can't Be Tamed	11	Poland	-
Marek Pompetzki	Miley Cyrus	I Can't Be Tamed	Can't Be Tamed	13	France	-
Marek Pompetzki	Miley Cyrus	I Can't Be Tamed	Can't Be Tamed	21	Sweden	-
Philippe-Marc Anquetil; Anna-Maria La Spina	Anna Maria La Spina	Always You	Always You	1	Australia	-
Anna-Maria La Spina; Hiten Bharadia; Philippe-Marc Anquetil	Anna Maria La Spina	Always You	Breaking Every Boundary	1	Australia	-
Anna-Maria La Spina; Philippe-Marc Anquetil	Anna Maria La Spina	Always You	Heavenly	1	Australia	-
Anna-Maria La Spina; Philippe-Marc Anquetil	Anna Maria La Spina	Always You	I Wish I'd Never Known	1	Australia	-
Anna-Maria La Spina; Philippe-Marc Anquetil; Cliff Masterson	Anna Maria La Spina	Always You	Love Holds The Answer	1	Australia	-
Anna-Maria La Spina; Angus MacGregor	Anna Maria La Spina	Always You	Sing With Me This Christmas Day	1	Australia	-
Anna-Maria La Spina; Philippe-Marc Anquetil	Anna Maria La Spina	Always You	Vita	1	Australia	-
Anna-Maria La Spina; Karl Guner	Anna Maria La Spina	Always You	Vivere	1	Australia	-
Philippe-Marc Anquetil	Play	Under My Skin	Under My Skin	7	Sweden	-
2009
Christopher Lee-Joe; Denise Saneinia	Lisa Lois	Smoke	It Ain't Right	6	Holland	-
Cliff Masterson; Fredrik Bostrom; Johnny's Entertainment	Koe Wo Awasetara	Playzone	Koe Wo Awasetara	6	Japan	-
Hiten Bharadia; Philippe-Marc Anquetil; Christopher Lee-Joe	Tata Young	Ready for Love	Mission is You	1	Japan	-
Philippe-Marc Anquetil; Iain James	Toho Shinki	Secret Code	Box In The Ship	2	Japan	Gold
Iain James	Toho Shinki	Secret Code	Survivor	2	Japan	Gold
Hiten Bharadia; Philippe-Marc Anquetil; Christopher Lee-Joe	Kumi Koda	Driving Hits (remix album)	Run For Your Life	6	Japan	-
	Kevin Borg	The Beginning	Beating Me Up	3	Sweden	Gold
Iain James	Kevin Borg	The Beginning	Out of Time	3	Sweden	Gold
Hiten Bharadia; Paulo Mendonca	Kevin Borg	The Beginning	The Last Words	3	Sweden	Gold
Hiten Bharadia; Paulo Mendonca	Kevin Borg	The Beginning	The Light You Leave On	3	Sweden	Gold
Hiten Bharadia; Iain James	Kevin Borg	The Beginning	When Sunlight	3	Sweden	Gold
2008
Christopher Lee-Joe	Anna Tsuchiya	Virgin Cat	Virgin Cat	10	Japan	-
Philippe-Marc Anquetil; Christopher Lee-Joe; Iain James; Marvin Ambrosius	Toho Shinki	Mirotic	Wrong Number	1	Korea	6 x Platinum
Christopher Lee-Joe; Iain James	Donnie Klang	You're My Idol	You're My Idol	19	US	-
Iain James; Philip Hochstrate; Radhika Vekaria	Cleopatre Musical	Cleopatre	De L'Ombre A La Lumiere	12	France	-
Philippe-Marc Anquetil; Christopher Lee-Joe; Thomas Jensen; Darren Monson	Leah Dizon	Communication	Love Paradox	16	Japan	-
Philippe-Marc Anquetil; Karl Guner	Leah Dizon	Communication	Without A	16	Japan	-
Philippe-Marc Anquetil; Dan Gautreau	W-inds	Seventh Avenue	New Day	10	Japan	-
Iain James; Terence Martin; Rick Smith	W-inds	Seventh Avenue	Reloaded	10	Japan	-
Philippe-Marc Antequil; Christopher Lee-Joe; Anna-Maria La Spina	Kumi Koda	Kingdom	More	1	Japan	3 x Platinum
Philippe-Marc Antequil; Christopher-Lee Joe; Marcus John	Toho Shinki	T	Crazy Life	4	Japan	Gold
Philippe-Marc Antequil; Christopher-Lee Joe; Iain James	Toho Shinki	T	Ride On	4	Japan	Gold
2007
Hiten Bharadia; Philippe-Marc Anquetil; Iain James	W-inds	Best Eleven	Past Tense	19	Japan	-
Hiten Bharadia; Paulo Mendonca; Iain James	Craig David	Officially Yours	Officially Yours	11	Japan	-
Hiten Bharadia; Paulo Mendonca; Iain James	Craig David	Officially Yours	Officially Yours	16	Switzerland	-
Hiten Bharadia; Paulo Mendonca; Iain James	Craig David	Officially Yours	Officially Yours	18	France	-
Hiten Bharadia; Paulo Mendonca; Iain James	Craig David	Officially Yours	Officially Yours	18	UK	Gold
Hiten Bharadia; Paulo Mendonca; Iain James	Craig David	Officially Yours	Officially Yours	19	Italy	-
Hiten Bharadia; Philipe Marc Anquetil	Natalia	Everything and More	Everything and More	1	Belgium	2 x Platinum
Hiten Bharadia	Kalan Porter	Wake Up Living	One Last Try	7	Canada	-
Hiten Bharadia	Maury	Street Parade 2007	Respect	2	UK	Gold
Hiten Bharadia	Ben's Brother	Beta Male Fairytales	I Am Who I Am	14	UK	-
Hiten Bharadia; Philip Hochstrate	Fabienne Louves	Schwarz Uf Wiss	Wot Mech Salber Si	12	Switzerland	-
Hiten Bharadia; Paulo Mendonca; Iain James	W-inds	Journey	Is That You?	8	Japan	-
Philippe-Marc Anquetil; Christopher-Lee Joe; Danny Latouff	W-inds	Journey	This Is Our Show	8	Japan	-
Christopher-Lee Joe; Iain James	Toho Shinki	Five In The Black	Zion	10	Japan	-
2006
Hiten Bharadia	Joana Zimmer	The Voice In Me	In Between	20	Germany	-
Hiten Bharadia	Lemar	The Truth About Love	Just Can't Live Without Each Other	3	UK	Platinum
Hiten Bharadia; Philippe-Marc Anquetil; Christopher-Lee Joe	Tata Young	Temperature Rising	El Nin-Yo	1	Thailand	Gold
Hiten Bharadia; Philippe-Marc Anquetil; Christopher-Lee Joe	Tata Young	Temperature Rising	El Nin-Yo	5	Japan	-
