= Wolf (Exo song) =

2013 single by Exo

Single by Exo

from the album XOXO
- Language: Korean; Mandarin
- Released: May 30, 2013
- Recorded: 2013
- Studio: SM Blue Ocean (Seoul); SM Big Shot (Seoul); SM Yellow Tail (Seoul)
- Genre: Brostep; industrial hip hop
- Length: 3:52
- Label: SM; KT Music
- Composers: Kenzie; Will Simms; Nermin Harambašić
- Lyricists: Kenzie (Korean); Zhou Weijie (Chinese)
- Producers: Kenzie; Will Simms

Exo Korean and Chinese singles chronology
"Mama" (2012)	"Wolf" (2013)	"Growl" (2013)

Music video
- "Wolf" (Korean Ver.) on YouTube "Wolf" (Chinese Ver.) on YouTube

"Wolf" (Korean: 늑대와 미녀; RR: Neukdaewa Minyeo; lit. 'The Wolf and the Beauty'; Chinese: 狼与美女; pinyin: Láng yǔ Měinǚ) is a song by South Korean–Chinese boy band Exo, released on May 30, 2013, as the lead single of their first studio album XOXO. It was released in both Korean and Chinese versions by their label SM Entertainment, and was their first song recorded by all twelve members.

== Background ==
"Wolf" was composed by Will Simms, Nermin Harambašić from Dsign Music and S.M. Entertainment resident songwriter Kenzie. Kenzie also provided the lyrics for the Korean version of the song while Zhou Weijie penned the lyrics for the Mandarin Chinese version, "狼与美女". Yoo Young-jin provides background vocals. The song is produced by Will Simms and Kenzie, and is described as a Dubstep inspired Hip-hop song that tells a tragic love story between a werewolf and a beauty.

The dance for the song was choreographed by Tony Testa. In several shows such as Arirang's After School Club, the members explain that the dance has 3 elements: the trees and forest, the caves, and the wolf itself. Member Kris revealed that it took them approximately 3 to 4 months to get the choreography down, due to its level of difficulty.

A demo version of the song was leaked in February 2013, in response to which producer Ryan Jhun later gave a warning to illegal downloaders on May 29, 2013, "...I will report it to FBI and service department for all links...".

== Release and promotions ==
On May 30, 2013, the Korean and Chinese versions of the music video for "Wolf" were released.

EXO started promoting for the song on Korean music program on May 30, 2013.

Both song versions were released digitally on June 3, 2013. The first performance of the Mandarin version of the song was aired on a popular Chinese variety show Happy Camp in mid-June.

== Music videos ==
On May 30, 2013, the Korean and Chinese versions of the music video for "Wolf" were released. The music videos features the performance of the song by the members.

== Reception ==
The song reached number ten on Gaon Digital Chart, number 25 on Korea K-Pop Hot 100, and number four on Billboard US World Digital Songs.

"Wolf" earned EXO their first win on South Korean music programs. It won first place 4 times in total.

== Credits and personnel ==
Credits adapted from album's liner notes.

=== Studio ===
- SM Yellow Tail Studio – recording, mixing
- SM Big Shot Studio – recording, digital editing
- SM Blue Ocean Studio – recording
- Sonic Korea – mastering

=== Personnel ===
- SM Entertainment – executive producer
- Lee Soo-man – producer
- Kim Young-min – executive supervisor
- Exo – vocals
  - Baekhyun – background vocals
  - Chen – background vocals
  - Chanyeol – background vocals
  - D.O. – background vocals
- Zhou Weijie – Chinese lyrics
- Kenzie – producer, Korean lyrics, composition, arrangement, vocal directing, background vocals
- Will Simms – producer, composition, arrangement
- Nermin Harambasic – composition
- Yoo Young-jin – background vocals
- Gu Jong-pil – recording, mixing
- Lee Min-kyu – recording, digital editing
- Lee Seung-ho – recording
- Jeon Hoon – mastering

== Charts ==
=== Weekly charts ===
Chart (2013)	Peak position
South Korea (Gaon)	10
South Korea (K-Pop Hot 100)	25
US World Digital Songs (Billboard)	4

=== Monthly charts ===
Chart (2013)	Peak position
South Korean singles (Gaon)	30

== Sales ==
Region	Sales
South Korea (Gaon)	534,603
United States (Nielsen)	36,000

== Accolades ==
Awards for "Wolf"
Year	Organization	Award	Result	Ref.
2013	Myx Music Award	Favourite K-Pop Video	Won	

Music program wins for "Wolf"
Program	Date
Music Bank (KBS)	June 14, 2013
Show! Music Core (MBC)	June 15, 2013
Inkigayo (SBS)	June 16, 2013
Show Champion (MBC M)	June 19, 2013

== Release history ==
Release date and format of "Wolf"
Region	Date	Format(s)	Distributor
Various	May 30, 2013	Digital download; streaming	SM; KT Music
