= Henry Lau discography =

Recordings by Canadian singer-songwriter

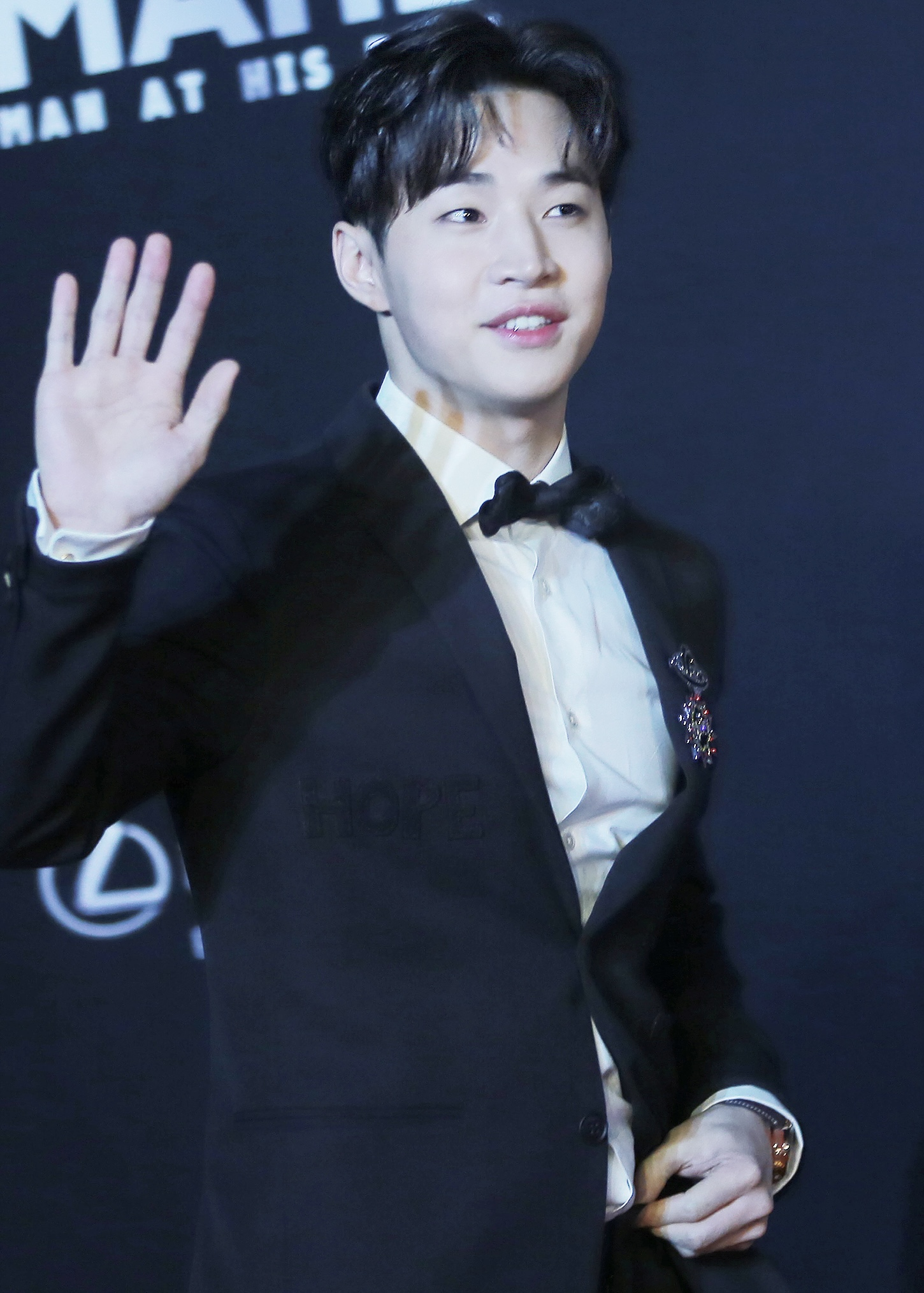
- Henry at the MAHB Awards in 2017
- EPs: 3
- Singles: 18

Canadian singer and songwriter Henry Lau has released three extended plays (EPs) and eighteen singles (and two as featured artist). Debuting as a member of Super Junior-M in 2008, he branched out as a solo artist in 2013 with the release of his first EP Trap. Besides composing songs for his solo releases, he has also produced songs for other artists, television and film soundtracks, and commercials.

== Extended plays ==
List of extended plays, with selected chart positions and sales
Title	Details	Peak chart positions					Sales
Title	Details	KOR	JPN	TW	US Heat	US World	Sales
Trap	Released: June 7, 2013; Label: SM Entertainment; Formats: CD, digital download, streaming	2	—	10	45	3	KOR: 40,566
Fantastic	Released: July 14, 2014; Label: SM Entertainment; Formats: CD, digital download, streaming	2	17	6	—	6	KOR: 22,038
Journey	Released: November 18, 2020; Label: Monster Entertainment Group; Formats: CD, digital download, streaming	1	—	—	—	—	KOR: 64,970
"—" denotes releases that did not chart or were not released in that region.

== Singles ==
=== As lead artist ===
List of singles, with selected chart positions, showing year released and album name
Title	Year	Peak chart positions			Sales (DL)	Album
Title	Year	KOR		US World	Sales (DL)	Album
Title	Year	Gaon	Hot (Note: The K-pop Hot 100 was inactive from July 2014 through May 2017.)	US World	Sales (DL)	Album
"Trap" (featuring Kyuhyun and Taemin)	2013	28	18	5	KOR: 332,245	Trap
"1-4-3 (I Love You)" (featuring Amber)	2013	35	31	—	KOR: 113,427	Trap
"Fantastic"	2014	18	—N/a	8	KOR: 168,917	Fantastic
"Runnin" (우리 둘) (with Soyou)	2016	—	—N/a	—	KOR: 30,801	SM Station Season 1
"Girlfriend" (그리워요)	2017	7	—N/a	—	KOR: 198,843	Non-album singles
"Real Love" (사랑 좀 하고 싶어)	2017	87	—N/a	—	KOR: 23,658	Non-album singles
"I'm Good" (끌리는 대로) (featuring Nafla)	2017	—	—	—	KOR: 21,951	Non-album singles
"That One"	2017	—	—	—		Non-album singles
"U&I" (쟤 보지 마) (with Sunny)	2017	—	—	—		S.M. Station Season 2
"Monster"	2018	—	—	9		Non-album singles
"Untitled Love Song" (제목 없는 Love Song)	2019	166	—	—		Non-album singles
"I LUV U"	2019	—	—	—		Non-album singles
"I Like It" (你怎么这个亚子) (with Far East Movement)	2019	—	—	—		Non-album singles
"Don't Forget" (한강의 밤) (featuring Rocoberry)	2019	73	—	—		Non-album singles
"But, I Love You" (可是我爱你)	2019	—	—	—		Non-album singles
"Thinking of You" (너만 생각해)	2020	—	—	—		Non-album singles
"Nice Things" (with Far East Movement and AlunaGeorge)	2020	—	—	—		Non-album singles
"Radio"	2020	172	—	—		Journey
"golden hour" (初光) (with Jvke)	2022	—	—	—		Non-album singles
"MOONLIGHT"	2023	—	—	—		Non-album singles
"MOONLIGHT (MOTi Remix)"	2023	—	—	—		Non-album singles
"Real Love Still Exists" (feat. Yuna)	2023	—	—	—		Non-album singles
"SUMMER SKY"	2023	—	—	—		Non-album singles
"Always Been You"	2024	—	—	—		Non-album singles
"Hypnotized"	2024	—	—	—		Non-album singles
"Closer To You"	2025	—	—	—		Non-album singles
"I Would"	2025	—	—	—		A newly arranged version of a song from the 2013 Trap album.
"甘願 (I Would)" (Chinese version)"	2025	—	—	—		Non-album singles
"太久 (Fade)" (Chinese)"	2025	—	—	—		Non-album singles
"오늘 하루만(Cold Air)" (Korean version)"	2026	—	—	—		Non-album singles
"冷空氣(Cold Air)" (Chinese version)"	2026	—	—	—		Non-album singles
"—" denotes releases that did not chart or were not released in that region.

=== As featured artist ===
Title	Year	Peak	Sales (DL)	Album
Title	Year	KOR	Sales (DL)	Album
"One Dream" (BoA featuring Henry & Key)	2012	34	KOR: 170,825	Only One
"Peach" (복숭아) (Jungmo featuring Henry)	2019	—		Non-album singles
"Anybody Out There" (Yultron featuring Henry & Sara Phillips)	2023	—		Non-album singles
"—" denotes releases that did not chart.

=== Soundtrack appearances ===
Title	Year	Peak chart positions		Sales (DL)	Album
Title	Year	KOR	PHL (Note: The Philippine Hot 100 existed from June 2017 to January 2018.)	Sales (DL)	Album
"That's Love" (這是愛) (with Donghae)	2012	—	—N/a		Skip Beat! OST
"Good Life" (with Tiffany)	2013	—	—N/a		Final Recipe OST
"The Way#Lies"	2015	—	—N/a		Persevere, Goo Haera OST
"Love+" (with Yoo Sung-eun)	2015	—	—N/a		Persevere, Goo Haera OST
"No More A Kid" (不再是孩子)	2016	—	—N/a		Sisters Over Flowers 2 OST
"I'm Here, Don't Be Afraid" (有我不怕)	2016	—	—N/a		Sisters Over Flowers 2 OST
"What To Do" (니 맘에 들어갈래) (with Mark)	2016	—	—N/a		Sweet Stranger and Me OST
"It's You"	2017	75	70	KOR: 45,899+	While You Were Sleeping OST
"Daughter's Love" (女儿情)	2018	—	—N/a		The Monkey King 3 OST
"Fall in Luv"	2019	—	—N/a		Rookie Historian Goo Hae-ryung OST
"Dance Smash" (舞蹈风暴)	2019	—	—N/a		Dance Smash OST
"Never Get Low" (别认怂) (with Jam Hsiao, Will Pan and Vava)	2020	—	—N/a		Jumanji: The Next Level OST
"Don't Go" (别离开)	2020	—	—N/a		Double World OST
"Too Good to Be True" (왜 이렇게 좋아)	2021	—	—N/a		Dramaworld OST
"Harmony of Leaves" (feat. Park Jin-woo)	2021	—	—N/a		Jirisan OST
"—" denotes releases that did not chart or were not released in that region.

== Other appearances ==
Title	Year	Peak chart positions		Album	Notes
Title	Year	KOR	CHN (Note: The Billboard China Top 100 existed from January to September 2019.)	Album	Notes
"Love Me" (爱我) (Zhang Liyin featuring Henry)	2009	—	—N/a	Moving On	
"Don't Lie" (SM The Ballad featuring Henry)	2010	—	—N/a	Miss You	
"Off My Mind" (表白)	2011	—	—N/a	Perfection	
"Santa U Are the One" (with Super Junior and Zhou Mi)	2011	64	—N/a	2011 SMTown; Winter: The Warmest Gift	
"Maxstep" (as part of Younique Unit)	2012	228	—N/a	PYL Younique Volume 1	
"Love That I Need" (Donghae & Eunhyuk featuring Henry)	2013	—	—N/a	I Wanna Dance	
"Baby"	2013	—	—N/a	Super Show 4	
"So Cold" (with Eunhyuk, Donghae and Siwon)	2015	—	—N/a	Super Show 5	
"Hey Bro"	2018	—	—N/a	Non-album single	SK Broadband collaboration
"Road" (with IU, Jo Hyun-ah and Yang Da-il)	2019	—	—	Then & Now	
"Who Will You Think Of" (当你孤单你会想起谁)	2019	—	18	Non-album singles	A Dog's Journey promotional single (Note: Chinese release.)
"Open to More" (featuring Clean Bandit)	2019	—	15	Non-album singles	Tuborg Open campaign
"Believe" (灵感) (The Chainsmokers x Tuborg Open Official Mix)	2020	—	—N/a	Non-album singles	Tuborg Open campaign
"Take Over" (with MAX and Jeremy McKinnon)	2020	—	—N/a	Non-album singles	League of Legends Worlds 2020; Theme Song
"All Better With Gram"	2020	—	—N/a	Non-album singles	LG Gram song
"Born a Winner"	2021	—	—N/a	Non-album singles	Peace Elite Super Cup 2021; Theme Song
"Home" (归) (with Roy Wang)	2021	—	—N/a	Summer Time	
"Baba Says" (Adawa and Shayiting EL)	2021	—	—N/a	Shang-Chi and the Legend of the Ten Rings: The Album	Uncredited vocals
"Game Start (LIVE)" (with Zhang Ze, Sen Guo and Park Ran)	2023	—	—N/a	The most beautiful night in 2022	piano performance
"Playin it smart"	2024	—	—N/a	Non-album single	Smart 25th Anniversary Brand Theme Song
"—" denotes releases that did not chart or were not released in that region.

=== Compilation appearances ===
Title	Year	Album	
"Odd Imagination" (엉뚱한 상상) (with Sunny)	2018	Two Yoo Project - Sugar Man 2 Part 6	
"It's You (Seoul Busking Ver.)" (with Lena Park, Hareem, Lim Heon-il)	2019	Begin Again; Season 3	Episode 1
"Love One (Sorrento Da Emilia Live Ver.)" (사랑 하나) (with Kim Feel, Suhyun, Hareem, Lim Heon-il)	2019	Begin Again; Season 3	Episode 2
"There's Nothing Holdin' Me Back (Ravello Busking Ver.)" (with Lena Park, Suhyun, Kim Feel, Hareem, Lim Heon-il)	2019	Begin Again; Season 3	Episode 4
"One Day (Amalfi Beach Busking Ver.)" (어느 날) (with Lena Park, Suhyun, Kim Feel, Hareem, Lim Heon-il)	2019	Begin Again; Season 3	Episode 4
"Thinking Out Loud (Sorrento Rooftop Bar Busking Ver.)" (with Kim Feel, Hareem, Lim Heon-il)	2019	Begin Again; Season 3	Episode 5
"Pierrot (Sorrento Rooftop Bar Busking Ver.)" (with Kim Feel, Hareem, Lim Heon-il, Lena Park)	2019	Begin Again; Season 3	Episode 5
"Fake Plastic Trees (Verona Piazza Bra Busking Ver.)" (with Lim Heon-il, Lena Park, Hareem)	2019	Begin Again; Season 3	Episode 11
"Untitled Love Song (Verona Piazza Bra Busking Ver.)" (with Lim Heon-il, Lena Park, Hareem, Kim Feel)	2019	Begin Again; Season 3	Episode 11
"I LUV U (Night Sea Busking Ver.)" (with Lim Heon-il, Lena Park, Hareem)	2019	Begin Again; Season 3	Episode 11
"I Love You (Verona Piazza delle Erbe Busking Ver.)" (with Kim Feel, Suhyun, Hareem, Lim Heon-il)	2019	Begin Again; Season 3	Episode 12
"Girls Like You (Sirmione Solo Busking Ver.)"	2019	Begin Again; Season 3	Episode 13
"Chocolate Story (Cremona Cathedral Busking Ver.)" (초콜릿 이야기) (with Lim Heon-il, Lena Park, Kim Feel, Suhyun, Hareem)	2019	Begin Again; Season 3	Episode 14
"Descendants of the Dragon" (龙的传人)	2019	Me and My Motherland – Voice for You	
"Youngblood (Drive-in Busking Ver.)"	2020	Begin Again; Korea	Episode 1
"Can't Stop the Feeling! (Daegu Stadium Ver.)"	2020	Begin Again; Korea	Episode 3
"I Don't Want to Miss a Thing (Cinema Busking Ver.)"	2020	Begin Again; Korea	Episode 5
"Believer (Opening Ver.)"	2020	Begin Again; Korea	Episode 6
"He's a Pirate (Classic Collaboration Busking Ver.)" (performed with Lee Nau and Hong Jin-ho)	2020	Begin Again; Korea	Episode 7
"Savage Love (Botanic Park Busking Ver.)"	2020	Begin Again; Korea	Episode 9
"Marvin Gaye (Camping Busking Ver.)" (with Sohyang)	2020	Begin Again; Korea	Episode 10
"Faded (Marina Busking Ver.)"	2020	Begin Again; Korea	Episode 10
"Trust Your Pace"	2021	Him-na song Label Project 01	

== Production credits ==
All credits below are sourced from Korea Music Copyright Association (search ID '10002950') and Music Copyright Society of China (search '刘宪华').

=== Solo work ===
Song	Lyrics		Music		Album	Year
Song	Credited	With	Credited	With	Album	Year
"Off My Mind"	Yes	Gen Neo	Yes	Ryan M. Tedder, Feleke Ross, DM	Perfection	2011
"1-4-3 (I Love You)"	No	—N/a	Yes	Gen Neo, Neil Nallas, Isaac Han	Trap	2013
"My Everything"	No	—	Yes	Gen Neo, Neil Nallas, Isaac Han	Trap	2013
"Ready 2 Love"	No	—	Yes	Gen Neo, Neil Nallas, Isaac Han	Trap	2013
"Bad Girl" (featuring Chanyeol)	No	—	Yes	Gen Neo, SAY	Fantastic	2014
"Saturday"	No	—	Yes	Gen Neo, SAY, Hooni	Fantastic	2014
"Butterfly" (featuring Seulgi)	No	—	Yes	Gen Neo, SAY, Hooni	Fantastic	2014
"You"	Yes	Misfit, SAY	Yes	Gen Neo, SAY, Hooni	Fantastic	2014
"No More A Kid"	Yes	Zhang Chuqiao	Yes	Gen Neo	Sisters Over Flowers 2 OST	2016
"I'm Here, Don't Be Afraid"	Yes	Zhang Chuqiao	Yes	Gen Neo	Sisters Over Flowers 2 OST	2016
"What To Do" (featuring Mark)	Yes	SAY, Yoyo	Yes	Gen Neo, Mage	Sweet Stranger and Me OST	2016
"Girlfriend"	Yes	Jinooya	Yes	Gen Neo	Non-album single	2017
"Real Love"	Yes	Jinooya	Yes	SAY, Hooni, Kim Ji-su	Non-album single	2017
"I'm Good" (featuring Nafla)	Yes	Nafla, Jinooya, MZMC, Kaelyn Behr, Michael Jiminez	Yes	MZMC, Michael Jiminez, Kaelyn Behr	Non-album single	2017
"That One"	Yes	Timothy 'Bos' Bullock, Michael Jiminez, MZMC	Yes	Timothy 'Bos' Bullock, Michael Jiminez, MZMC	Non-album single	2017
"It's You"	No	—	Yes	Kim Ji-su, Mike Woods, Kevin White, Andrew Bazzi	While You Were Sleeping OST	2017
"Daughter's Love"	No	—	Yes (Arrangement)	Xu Jingqing	The Monkey King 3 OST	2018
"Monster"	Yes	Mike Woods, Kevin White, Andrew Bazzi, MZMC, Park Juhyun(Korean ver.) (Note: Also credited are Zhang Chuqiao, Gen Neo (Chinese ver.))	Yes	Mike Woods, Kevin White, Andrew Bazzi, MZMC	Non-album single	2018
"Hey Bro"	No	—	Yes	Ryan Curtis, Origami	Non-album single	2018
"Untitled Love Song"	No	—	Yes	Gen Neo, Joseph Kirkland, Jason Dean, Phoebe Ryan, Daniel Seavey, Jay Kim, Corbyn Besson, Kim Ji-su	Non-album single	2019
"Who Will You Think Of"	No	—	Yes (Arrangement)	Shi Yingwei	A Dog's Journey OST	2019
"I LUV U"	No	—	Yes	Seo Won Jin, Kim Jisung, VVN	Non-album single	2019
"Open to More" (featuring Clean Bandit)	Yes	Gen Neo, Sydney Cubit	Yes	Mighty Mike, Sydney Cubit, Gen Neo, Clean Bandit, Sam Skirrow	Non-album single	2019
"Don't Forget" (featuring Rocoberry)	Yes	Rocoberry	Yes	Rocoberry	Non-album single	2019
"But, I Love You"	No	—	Yes	Gen Neo, Kim Jisu	Non-album single	2019
"Thinking of You"	No	—	Yes	Gen Neo, Noday, Riskypizza, Amos Ang	Non-album single	2020
"Believe"	Yes	—	Yes	—	Non-album single	2020
"Radio"	Yes	G.Soul	Yes	Gen Neo, Amos Ang	Journey	2020
"Hand's Up" (featuring pH-1)	Yes	Gen Neo, JINBO the SuperFreak, pH-1	Yes	Gen Neo, Amos Ang, JINBO the SuperFreak	Journey	2020
"Right Now"	Yes	—	Yes	Gen Neo	Journey	2020
"Just Be Me"	Yes	—	Yes	Gen Neo	Journey	2020
"Come Over"	No	—	Yes	JINBO the SuperFreak	Journey	2020
"All Better With Gram"	Yes	Gina Maeng	Yes	Hong Ji-sang, Andreas Ringblom, Frederik Jyll	Non-album single	2020
"Trust Your Pace"	No	—	Yes	Yonko, Song Jae-young, Jung Gu-seon, Lee Byung-do, Yoon Gap-yeol, Jung Sang-kwon	Him-na song Label Project 01	2021
"Too Good To Be True"	Yes	Gina Maeng	Yes	Kim Ji-su	Dramaworld OST	2021

=== Other work ===
Artist	Song	Lyrics		Music		Album	Year
Artist	Song	Credited	With	Credited	With	Album	Year
Super Junior	"All My Heart"	No	—	Yes	Leeteuk, Tesung Kim, Noday	Bonamana	2010
Super Junior	"Andante"	No	—	Yes	Leeteuk, Kim Kyuwon	A-CHa	2011
Super Junior-M	"Go"	No	—	Yes	Neil Nallas, Isaac Han	Break Down	2013
Super Junior-M	"It's You"	No	—	Yes	Gen Neo, Neil Nallas, Isaac Han	Break Down	2013
Donghae & Eunhyuk	"Love That I Need" (featuring Henry)	No	—	Yes	Gen Neo, Neil Nallas, Isaac Han, Miyakei	I Wanna Dance	2013
Eunhyuk	"Say My Name"	No	—	Yes	—	Super Show 4	2013
Super Junior-M	"My Love For You"	Yes	Gen Neo	Yes	Gen Neo	Swing	2014
Beat Burger	"She So High (Acoustic ver.)"	No	—	Yes (Arrangement)	Koo King, J.Williams, Jae, Yoon Do-hyun, Finger Flash	Electric Dream	2014
Donghae & Eunhyuk	"Lights, Camera, Action"	Yes	JQ, Gen Neo, Neil Nallas	Yes	Gen Neo, Neil Nallas	The Beat Goes On	2015
Donghae & Eunhyuk	"Let's Get It On"	No	—	Yes	Gen Neo, Mage	Let's Get It On	2015
Eunhyuk, Donghae, Siwon, Henry	"So Cold"	Yes	Eunhyuk, Gen Neo, Neil Nallas	Yes	Gen Neo, Neil Nallas	Super Show 5	2015
Kim Jong-hyun	"Beautiful Lady"	No	—	Yes	Gen Neo, Mage	Oh My Venus OST	2015
Seven	"Give It To Me"	No	—	Yes	The Stereotypes, Seven, Kam Parker	I Am Seven	2016
Henry, Soyou	"Runnin'"	Yes	SAY, The Stereotypes, Brother Su, Micah Powell	No	—	Non-album single	2016
EXO	"The Eve"	No	—	Yes	MZMC, Andrew Bazzi, Kevin White, Mike Woods	The War	2017
Parc Jae-jung, Mark	"Lemonade Love"	Yes	Parc Jae-jung, Mark, Yoon Jong-shin	Yes	Perc%nt, Primeboi, Yoon Jong-shin	Non-album single	2017
Henry, Sunny	"U&I"	Yes	Kenzie, Sunny	Yes	Andreas Öberg, Gen Neo, Daniel Klein, Charli Taft	Non-album single	2017
Henry, Far East Movement	"I Like It"	Yes	Adrian McKinnon, Leven Kali, Jeremy Jasper, Gen Neo, Far East Movement, Deng Shuyue, Zhang Chang	Yes	Jamil "Digi" Chammas, Charlie Handsome, Jonathan Perkins, Adrian McKinnon, Leven Kali, MZMC, Jeremy Jasper	Non-album single	2019
NIve	"How Do I"	No	—	Yes	Shin Hyuk, Park Jisoo, Lee Joon, Marco Reyes, Moon Yewon, Na Sunae	Bandages	2020
Henry, Roy Wang	"Home"	No	—	Yes	Roy Wang, Gen Neo, Amos Ang	Summer Time	2021
