= Henry Lau filmography =

Filmography

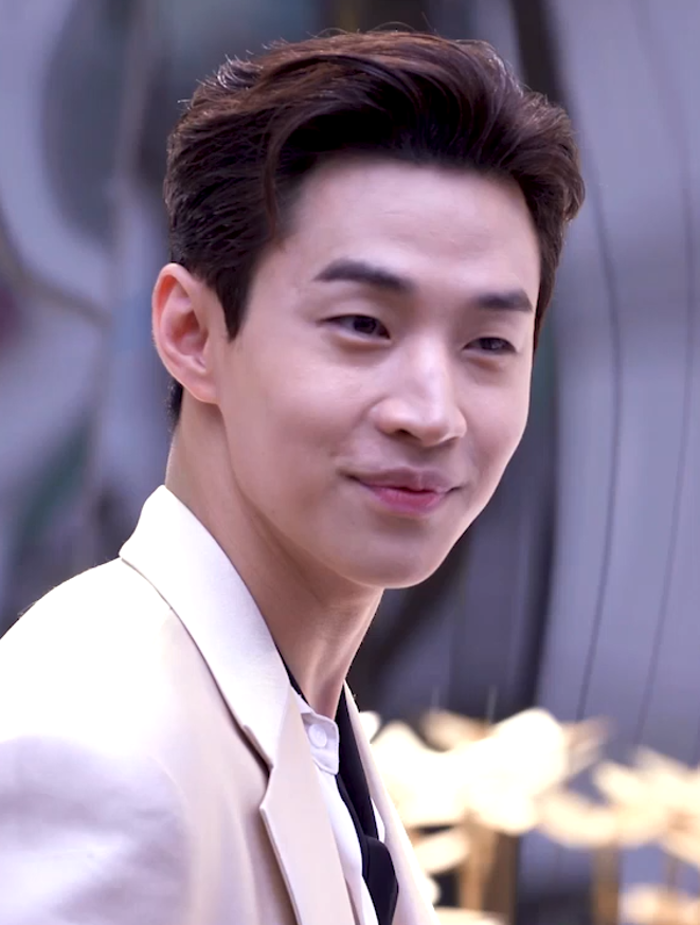
- Henry in May 2019
- Film: 3
- Television series: 4
- Television show: 30
- Radio show: 1
- Music videos: 26

Canadian singer and musician Henry Lau debuted in 2005 as a member of Super Junior, then in 2008 he was moved with fellow member Zhou Mi to be part of Super Junior-M. He was cast in the 2013 drama film Final Recipe in his acting debut, playing the male lead opposite Michelle Yeoh. In 2015, he played a supporting role in the South Korean drama Oh My Venus. In 2018, he shot two films back-to-back, the Chinese action-fantasy film Double World and his first American film A Dog's Journey; the films were released in 2020 and 2019 respectively. In 2021, he played a main role in the second season of Dramaworld.

Since gaining popularity on television with the 2014 series Real Man, Henry has appeared in numerous Korean and Chinese variety shows. His notable work include I Live Alone, Begin Again, Back to Field, and Super-Vocal.

== Film ==
Year	Title	Role	Notes	Ref.
2013	Final Recipe	Mark	Main role	
2019	A Dog's Journey	Trent	Main role	
2020	Double World	Dong Yilong	Main role	

== Television ==
=== As an actor ===
Year	Title	Role	Network	Notes	Ref.
2013	My Sweet City	Peng Bo Yu	—N/a	Unreleased	
2015	Persevere, Goo Hae-ra	Henry	Mnet	Supporting role	
2015	Oh My Venus	Kim Ji-woong	KBS2	Supporting role	
2019	Level Up	Road manager	MBN	Cameo, Episode 11	
2021	Dramaworld 2	Woo Sung	Lifetime, iQIYI	Main role	

=== As himself ===
Year	English Title	Native Title	Network	Role	Language	Ref.
2013	MasterChef Korea Celebrity	마스터셰프 코리아 셀러브리티	O'live	Cast	Korean	
2014	Always Cantare	언제나 칸타레	tvN	Cast	Korean	
2014–15	Real Man	진짜 사나이	MBC	Cast	Korean	
2014–15	Super Junior-M Guest House	슈퍼주니어M의 게스트하우스	SBS	Cast	Korean	
2015	Match Made in Heaven Returns	천생연분 리턴즈	MBC Every1	Cast	Korean	
2015	We Got Married 4	우리 결혼했어요4	MBC	Cast	Korean	
2015	Always Cantare 2	언제나 칸타레2	tvN	Cast	Korean	
2015	Where Is My Friend's Home	내 친구의 집은 어디인가	JTBC	Cast	Korean	
2016	Best Man	가싶남	KBS2	Cast	Korean	
2016	Sisters Over Flowers 2	花样姐姐第二季	Dragon TV	Cast	Chinese	
2016	Are You Normal 3	你正常吗第三季	Tencent	Host	Chinese	
2016	Let Go of My Baby	放开我北鼻	Tencent	Cast	Chinese	
2016	Sunshine Art Fitness	阳光艺体能	Hubei TV	Cast	Chinese	
2016	I'm a Movie Director Too 3	나도 영화 감독이다 : 청춘 무비	Channel CGV	Cast	Korean	
2016	Fly Over Kitchen	穿越吧厨房	Youku	Cast	Chinese	
2017	Back to Field	向往的生活	Hunan TV	Cast	Chinese	
2017	Snowball Project	눈덩이 프로젝트	Naver TV	Cast	Korean	
2017	Fly Over Kitchen 2	穿越吧厨房第二季	Youku	Cast	Chinese	
2017–18	All Broadcasting in the World	세모방 : 세상의 모든 방송	MBC	Cast	Korean	
2017–18	Perhaps Love 4	如果爱第四季	Hubei TV	Cast	Chinese	
2017–21	I Live Alone	나 혼자 산다	MBC	Cast	Korean	
2018	Back to Field 2	向往的生活第二季	Hunan TV	Cast	Chinese	
2018	Begin Again 2	비긴어게인2	JTBC	Cast	Korean	
2018–19	Super-Vocal	声入人心	Hunan TV	Judge	Chinese	
2019	Begin Again 3	비긴어게인3	JTBC	Cast	Korean	
2019	Dance Smash	舞蹈风暴	Hunan TV	Judge	Chinese	
2019	Miss Voice	这样唱好美	iQIYI	Judge	Chinese	
2020	Begin Again Korea	비긴어게인 코리아	JTBC	Cast	Korean	
2020	Begin Again Reunion	비긴어게인 Reunion	JTBC	Cast	Korean	
2021	Street Dance of China S4	这就是街舞4	Youku	Host	Chinese	
2022	Fly to the Dance	플라이 투 더 댄스	JTBC	Cast	Korean	
2026	Veiled Cup	베일드 컵	SBS	Judge	Korean	

== Web series ==
Year	Title	Role	Network	Notes	Ref.
2018	Real Life Love Story	Boyfriend	Dingo K-Drama	Season 2, Episode 9	

== Radio show ==
Year	Title	Network	Notes	Ref.
2013	Super Junior Kiss The Radio	KBS Cool FM	"Goodnight Pops" host	

== Music videos ==
Year	Song title	Artist
2007	"Don't Don"	Super Junior
2011	"Santa U Are The One"	SM Town
2013	"Trap" (featuring Kyuhyun and Taemin)	Henry
2013	"1-4-3 (I Love You)" (featuring Amber)	Henry
2014	"Fantastic"	Henry
2016	"Runnin'"	Henry, Soyou
2017	"Real Love"	Henry
2017	"I'm Good" (featuring nafla)	Henry
2017	"Lemonade Love"	Parc Jae-jung, Mark
2017	"That One"	Henry
2017	"U&I"	Henry, Sunny
2018	"Monster"	Henry
2019	"Untitled Love Song"	Henry
2019	"I LUV U"	Henry
2019	"But, I Love You"	Henry
2019	"Don't Forget" (featuring Rocoberry)	Henry
2020	"Thinking About You"	Henry
2020	"Trust Your Pace"	Henry
2020	"Movie"	Kang Daniel
2020	"Radio"	Henry
2020	"Just Be Me"	Henry
2021	"Home"	Henry, Roy Wang

=== Promotional MVs ===
Year	Song title	Promoting
2012	"Maxstep" (as part of Younique Unit)	Hyundai
2018	"Hey Bro"	SK Broadband
2019	"Open to More" (featuring Clean Bandit)	Tuborg
2020	"All Better With Gram"	LG Gram
