= Jiang Yan =

Jiang Yan may refer to:

- Jiang Yan (poet) (444–505), Chinese poet
- Jiang Yan (rower) (born 1989), Chinese Olympic rower
- Jiang Yan (actress), winner of the 2024 Magnolia Award for Best Supporting Actress in a Television Series

== See also ==
- Jiangyan District
- Jiang Yiyan, Chinese actress and singer
