= Journey (Henry EP) =

- Digital cover

EP by Henry
- Released: November 18, 2020
- Recorded: 2020
- Studio: Iconic (Seoul)
- Genre: Ballad; R&B; soul
- Length: 19:06
- Language: Korean; English
- Label: Monster Entertainment Group; Kakao M
- Producer: Henry; Gen Neo; JINBO the SuperFreak; Amos Ang

Henry chronology
Fantastic (2014)	Journey (2020)

Singles from Journey
- 1. "Radio" Released: November 18, 2020

Journey (stylized in all caps) is the third extended play (EP) by Canadian singer and songwriter Henry. It was released on November 18, 2020, through Monster Entertainment Group, and distributed by Kakao M. The EP marks his first album release in 6 years and the first under his own independent label. "Radio" serves as the lead single for the album.

== Background and release ==
After his contract with SM Entertainment expired in 2018, Henry established his own independent label, Monster, with his brother. He was reportedly in the process of recording a new album in 2019. He later scrapped a completed album several months prior to the release of Journey as he felt his sound had evolved and the album no longer headed in the musical direction he wanted.

Journey tells a story about love, friendship, hardships, and a story of being true to yourself. Ultimately, it’s a story about progression and always moving forward.

— Henry on the meaning of the album, Men's Folio

First teaser images of the album was revealed through his Instagram on October 29, 2020. He first revealed the title of the album on Weverse on November 3. The full album track-list comprising five tracks was revealed on November 13, with "Radio" as the title track. The album along with the music video for "Radio" was released on November 18, marking Henry's first album release in 6 years. The music video for the B-side track "Just Be Me" was released two weeks later on December 3.

== Reception ==
Seoulbeats described Journey as a "musically fulfilling" album that "shows his true colors while giving nods to his complicated musical past" and praised the interesting production elements which makes the album stand out from other recent solo releases. They highlighted the B-side "Just Be Me" as the stand-out track calling it an "effective and memorable power ballad" that rounds out the album. Allkpop was "pleasantly enthralled" by the album and stated that "Hand's Up" is a must-listen, describing it as "funky and groovy" and "immaculate in flow", and noted that the rap by pH-1 perfectly matched the energy of the song.

== Track listing ==
Credits adapted from the album's liner notes and Melon.

Journey – Standard edition
No.	Title	Lyrics	Music	Arrangement	Length
1.	"Radio"	Henry; G.Soul	Henry; Gen Neo; Amos Ang	Henry; Gen Neo; Amos Ang	3:11
2.	"Hands Up" (featuring pH-1)	Henry; Gen Neo; JINBO the SuperFreak; pH-1	Henry; Gen Neo; Amos Ang; JINBO the SuperFreak	Henry; Gen Neo; Amos Ang	3:09
3.	"Right Now (Note: 지금이야; Jigeumiya; lit. "Now")"	Henry	Henry; Gen Neo	Henry; Gen Neo	2:46
4.	"Just Be Me"	Henry	Henry; Gen Neo	Henry; Gen Neo	3:05
5.	"Come Over (Note: 우리집; Uri jip; lit. "Our house")" (featuring Gray, Kim Go-eun, Park Na-rae, Joon Park, Lee Hi, Jeon Hyun-moo, Jessi, Han Hye-jin)	JINBO the SuperFreak	Henry; JINBO the SuperFreak	Henry; JINBO the SuperFreak	3:46
6.	"Radio (Instrumental) (Note: Track 7 on the physical edition.)"		Henry; Gen Neo; Amos Ang	Henry; Gen Neo; Amos Ang	3:09
Total length:					19:06

Journey – Physical edition bonus track
No.	Title	Lyrics	Music	Arrangement	Length
6.	"Radio (Chinese Version)"	周洁颖; Henry; Gen Neo; MarshmelloW	Henry; Gen Neo; Amos Ang	Henry; Gen Neo; Amos Ang	3:11
Total length:					22:17

== Charts ==
Weekly chart performance for Journey
Chart (2020)	Peak position
South Korean Albums (Gaon)	1

Monthly chart performance for Journey
Chart (2020)	Peak position
South Korean Albums (Gaon)	23

== Sales ==
Sales for Journey
Region	Sales
South Korea (Gaon) (Note: Sales figure as of March 2021.)	64,970

== Release history ==
Release history for Journey
Region	Date	Format	Label
South Korea	November 18, 2020	CD	Monster Entertainment; Kakao M
Various	November 18, 2020	Digital download; streaming	Monster Entertainment
