= Gen Neo =

Singaporean singer-songwriter

- 梁根荣
- Born: Liang Genrong; June 18, 1989 (age 37); Singapore
- Other name: Genneo
- Education: Berklee College of Music
- Occupations: Singer-songwriter; producer; composer
- Musical career
- Genres: K-pop; Mandopop; R&B
- Instruments: Vocals; piano; guitar
- Years active: 2015–present
- Labels: Mapps Entertainment; BAMM Entertainment; Monster Entertainment Group

Chinese name
- Simplified Chinese: 梁根荣
Transcriptions
Standard Mandarin
- Hanyu Pinyin: Liáng Gēnróng

Gen Neo (Chinese: 梁根荣; Korean: 젠니오; born June 18, 1989), is a Singaporean singer-songwriter, producer and composer based in South Korea, under BAMM Entertainment.

== Early life ==
Gen Neo was born on June 18, 1989, in Singapore. He attended Catholic High School and Victoria Junior College before moving to South Korea to become a producer and composer. Gen attended Berklee College of Music where he met his frequent collaborator and close friend, Henry Lau.

== Career ==
Gen started his music career in South Korea as part of a production team called NoizeBank, consisting of Canadian musician Henry Lau, and producers Isaac Han and Neil Nallas. He has composed and produced for various artists such as Got7, Super Junior-M, Henry Lau, and f(x).

Being vocally-trained and gifted with a unique vocal tone, Gen also made his debut in Korea in 2015 with the single titled "Think About Us" signed under the company Mapps Entertainment. He shortly departed from the company to pursue his own vision and founded his own independent label BAMM. His first mandopop single "Stop Sugar" was released in December 2016 was charted on iTunes Mandopop Charts at number 12 beside veterans JJ Lin and Jay Chou.

Gen was featured in f(x) member Amber Liu's single titled "On My Own". The Korean and English versions were released on May 18, 2016, on SM Entertainment and Liu's YouTube channel respectively. The single charted on Billboard World Digital Song charts at number 11.

In 2017, Gen released his debut EP, Dimensions with a total of 4 tracks in it.

He released another single, "Come With Me" in 2017. He then collaborated with former Miss A member Fei in the single, "Will You Won't You". He released "从今以后" on September 28, 2018, and was featured in Amber Liu's "Right Now". On the December 31, 2019, Gen released the single "Over You".

== Influences ==
Gen has stated that his music is influenced by 90's R&B music and recent acts such as Canadian hip hop artist, Drake. Jay Chou, Wang Leehom, David Tao and Khalil Fong were also some of the Mandopop artists that had influenced him.

== Discography ==
=== Albums ===
| Album information | Track listing |
|---|---|
| Dimensions: EP; Released: August 2017; Label: BAMM Entertainment | Track listing: 1. 每分每秒; 2. Reverse (后退); 3. Missing You; 4. 陌生朋友 |
| Ad Astra: EP; Released: December 29, 2020; Label: Monster Entertainment Group | Track listing: 1. Ur Type; 2. Hold Back; 3. What Can I Do (feat. J.Sheon); 4. Where to Go; 5. Bye; 6. Running |

=== Singles ===
| Title | Year | Album |
|---|---|---|
| "Think About Us" | 2015 | Non-album single |
| "Stop Sugar" | 2016 | Non-album single |
| "每分每秒" | 2017 | Dimensions |
| "Reverse" | 2017 | Dimensions |
| "Missing You" (featuring Tracy Wang) | 2017 | Dimensions |
| "陌生朋友" | 2017 | Dimensions |
| "Come With Me" | 2017 | Non-album single |
| "从今以后" | 2018 | Non-album single |
| "Over You" | 2019 | Non-album single |
| "Mine" (featuring Sam Rui) | 2020 | Non-album single |
| "Body" (featuring Casper.True) | 2020 | Non-album single |
| "Why We Waiting" | 2020 | Non-album single |
| "Ur Type" | 2020 | Ad Astra |
| "Hold Back" | 2020 | Ad Astra |
| "What Can I Do" (featuring J.Sheon) | 2020 | Ad Astra |
| "Where to Go" | 2020 | Ad Astra |
| "Bye" | 2020 | Ad Astra |
| "Running" | 2020 | Ad Astra |

=== Collaborations ===
| Title | Year | Peak chart positions | | Album |
| Title | Year | CHN V Chart | US World | Album |
|---|---|---|---|---|
| "On My Own" (Amber Liu featuring Gen Neo) | 2016 | — | 11 | Non-album single |
| "Will You Won't You" (你会不会) (with Fei) | 2018 | 4 | — | Non-album single |
| "Right Now" (Amber Liu featuring Gen Neo) | 2018 | — | — | Rogue Rouge |
"—" denotes releases that did not chart or were not released in that region.

== Videography ==
=== Music videos ===
| Year | Title | Artist | Ref. |
|---|---|---|---|
| 2015 | "Think About Us" | Gen Neo | |
| 2016 | "Stop Sugar" | Gen Neo | |
| 2017 | "Reverse" (后退) | Gen Neo | |
| 2017 | "Missing You" | Gen Neo feat. Tracy Wang | |
| 2018 | "Will You Won't You" (你 会不会) | Gen Neo with Fei | |
| 2018 | "从今以后" | Gen Neo | |
| 2018 | "Right Now" | Amber Liu feat. Gen Neo | |
| 2019 | "Over You" | Gen Neo | |
| 2020 | "Hold Back" | Gen Neo | |

=== Television shows ===
| Year | English title | Original title | Role | Notes |
|---|---|---|---|---|
| 2017 | Sound Of My Dream 2 | 梦想的声音2 | Contestant | Episode 5 |

== Production credits ==
| Year | Album | Artist | Song | Lyrics | | Music & Arrangement | |
| Year | Album | Artist | Song | Credited | With | Credited | With |
|---|---|---|---|---|---|---|---|
| 2011 | Perfection | Henry | "表白 Off My Mind" | Yes | Henry Lau | No | —N/a |
| 2012 | Pop It Up | William Chan | "女皇" | No | — | Yes | — |
| 2012 | Self Portrait | Raymond Lam | "LFX 6.8" | No | — | Yes | — |
| 2013 | Super Show 5 | Eunhyuk, Donghae, Siwon, Henry | "So Cold" | No | — | Yes | Henry Lau, Neil Nallas, Isaac Han (Noize Bank) |
| 2013 | Break Down | Super Junior-M | "Go" | No | — | Yes | Henry Lau, Neil Nallas, Isaac Han (Noize Bank) |
| 2013 | Break Down | Super Junior-M | "It's You" | No | — | Yes | Henry Lau, Neil Nallas, Isaac Han (Noize Bank) |
| 2013 | Trap | Henry | "1-4-3 (I Love You)" | No | — | Yes | Henry Lau, Neil Nallas, Isaac Han (Noize Bank) |
| 2013 | Trap | Henry | "My Everything" | No | — | Yes | Henry Lau, Neil Nallas, Isaac Han (Noize Bank) |
| 2013 | Trap | Henry | "Ready to Love" | No | — | Yes | Henry Lau, Neil Nallas, Isaac Han (Noize Bank) |
| 2013 | Pink Tape | Amber Liu, Luna, Krystal, D.O. | "Goodbye Summer" | No | — | Yes | Amber Liu |
| 2014 | Feeling | Roh Ji-hoon | "A Song for You" | No | — | Yes | Roh Ji-hoon |
| 2014 | Ride Me | Donghae & Eunhyuk feat. Henry | "Love That I Need" | No | — | Yes | Henry Lau, Neil Nallas, Isaac Han (Noize Bank) |
| 2014 | Swing | Super Junior-M | "无所谓 My Love For You" | Yes | Henry Lau | Yes | Henry Lau, Neil Nallas, Isaac Han (Noize Bank) |
| 2014 | Chapter 8 | g.o.d | "G'swag" | No | — | Yes | Kim, Red Rocket |
| 2014 | Fantastic | Henry feat. Seulgi | "Butterfly" | No | — | Yes | Henry Lau, SAY, Hooni |
| 2014 | Fantastic | Henry feat. Chanyeol | "Bad Girl" | No | — | Yes | Henry Lau, SAY |
| 2014 | Fantastic | Henry | "Saturday" | No | — | Yes | Henry Lau, SAY, Hooni |
| 2014 | Fantastic | Henry | "You" | No | — | Yes | Henry Lau, Hooni |
| 2015 | First | Ferlyn Wong | "Open Up Your Heart" | No | — | Yes | — |
| 2015 | First | Ferlyn Wong feat. Mint | "Luv Talk" | No | — | Yes | — |
| 2015 | Beautiful | Amber feat. Eric Nam | "I Just Wanna" | No | — | Yes | Amber Liu |
| 2015 | The Beat Goes On | Donghae & Eunhyuk | "Lights, Camera, Action" | No | — | Yes | Henry Lau, Neil Nallas |
| 2015 | Let's Get It On | Donghae & Eunhyuk | "Let's Get It On" | No | — | Yes | Henry Lau, Mage |
| 2015 | Oh My Venus OST | Kim Jong-hyun | "Beautiful Lady" | No | — | Yes | Henry Lau, Mage |
| 2016 | Sisters Over Flowers Season 2 OST | Henry | "不再是孩子 No More A Kid" | No | — | Yes | Henry Lau |
| 2016 | Act. 7 | 4Minute | "No Love" | Yes | Ra-young, Hyuna, Jeon Ji-yoon | Yes | — |
| 2016 | Sweet Stranger and Me OST | Henry feat. Mark | "I Want to Enter Your Heart" | No | — | Yes | Henry Lau, Mage |
| 2016 | The Feelin’ 搶先聽 | Raymond Lam | "The Feelin" | Yes | 天樂 | Yes | — |
| 2016 | Non-album single | Gen Neo | "Stop Sugar" | No | — | Yes | — |
| 2017 | Non-album single | Henry | "Girlfriend" | No | — | Yes | Henry Lau |
| 2017 | Dimensions | Gen Neo | "每分每秒" | Yes | Yanis Yang | Yes | — |
| 2017 | Dimensions | Gen Neo | "Reverse" | No | — | Yes | — |
| 2017 | Dimensions | Gen Neo feat. Tracy Wang | "Missing You" | No | — | Yes | — |
| 2017 | Dimensions | Gen Neo | "陌生朋友" | No | — | Yes | — |
| 2017 | Act. 3 Chococo Factory | Gugudan | "Snowball" | No | — | Yes | Andreas Oberg, Maria Marcus |
| 2017 | Non-album single | Gen Neo | "Come With Me" | No | — | Yes | — |
| 2018 | Rogue Rouge | Amber Liu feat. Gen Neo | "Right Now" | Yes | Amber Liu | Yes | — |
| 2018 | Rogue Rouge | Amber Liu | "Closed Doors" | Yes | Amber Liu | Yes | — |
| 2018 | Present: You & Me | Jackson Wang, BamBam, Yugyeom | "I Love It" | Yes | Jackson Wang | Yes | Jackson Wang |
| 2018 | Present: You & Me | Jackson Wang, BamBam, Yugyeom | "WOLO" | No | — | Yes | Jackson Wang |
| 2018 | Non-album single | Gen Neo with Fei | "Will You Wont You" | Yes | Fei | Yes | Fei |
| 2019 | Non-album single | Bomin | "Can't Love" | Yes | Bomin | Yes | Bomin |
| 2019 | ESCAPE. | Lin Yanjun | "Get Outta My Head" | No | — | Yes | — |
| 2019 | Non-album single | Henry | "Untitled Love Song" | No | — | Yes | Henry Lau, Joseph Kirkland, Jason Dean, Phoebe Ryan, Daniel Seavey, Jay Kim, Corbyn Besson, 김지수 |
| 2019 | Non-album single | Casper | "Sweet Love" | Yes | Casper, Lin du, Um In Han, Park Ju Seung, Lim Seung Hoo | Yes | — |
| 2019 | Non-album single | Casper | "Now or Never" | No | — | Yes | Lee Sung Han, Keidy-Ko Dong Kyun, Jay Kick-Park Se Joon |
| 2019 | Non-album single | Casper | "Real Fighter" | Yes | Casper, Ruediger Matthias Volker Schramm, Park Ju Seung, Lim Seung Hoo | Yes | Keidy-Ko Dong Kyun, Jay Kick-Park Se Joon |
| 2019 | Non-album single | Henry | "But, I Love You" | No | — | Yes | Henry, Kim Jisoo |
| 2019 | Non-album single | Gen Neo | "Over U" | Yes | OHMYMEITING, 张楚翹 | Yes | — |
| 2021 | Summer Time | Roy Wang | "HOME" | Yes | Marshall, Roy Wang, Amos Ang | Yes | Henry, Roy Wang, Amos Ang |
