= Trap (EP) =

EP by Henry
- Released: June 7, 2013 (Korean version); August 14, 2013 (Chinese version)
- Recorded: 2013
- Studios: S.M. Studios, Seoul
- Genres: R&B; Pop; Electro house
- Length: 28:33
- Languages: Korean; English; Mandarin
- Labels: SM; KT Music
- Producer: Lee Soo-man

Henry chronology
Trap (2013)	Fantastic (2014)

Singles from Trap
- 1. "Trap" Released: June 7, 2013; 2. "1-4-3 (I Love You)" Released: August 23, 2013

Trap is the debut solo extended play of Canadian singer and Super Junior-M member Henry. It was released on June 7, 2013, by S.M. Entertainment in South Korea. The tracks "Trap" and "1-4-3 (I Love You)" were chosen as the lead singles for the promotional cycle.

== Background ==
A video teaser for the title track of Henry Lau's debut EP, "Trap", was released on May 31, followed by a highlight medley video of the tracks included in his first mini-album.

The title track and EP's lead single was composed and arranged by a group of European music producers including Svante Halldin, Emilh Tigerlantz and Geraldo Sandell. The lyrics were penned by Misfit who has also contributed to many other songs of various SM Town artists. The piano instrumental was performed by Henry himself. The accompanying choreography was put together by Shaun Evaristo, who has previously worked on many other songs with other artists of SM Town, including BoA for "Not Over U", Super Junior for "From U" and Super Junior-M for "Go".

The EP's second promotional single was "1-4-3 (I Love You)". In the song, 1-4-3 represents the breakdown of how many letters it takes to write "I love you". Using this specific number sequence became popular in the 1990s with the advent of pagers. The song also mentions the number sequence of 4-8-6, which represents the breakdown of how many strokes it takes to write 사랑해 (saranghae, the Korean phrase for "I love you") in Hangul.

== Releases ==
The album was officially released in South Korea on June 7, 2013, along with the music video of "Trap". An English version of "Trap" was released as a part of the digital single "1-4-3 (I Love You)" on August 23, 2013.

The Taiwan edition of Trap was released on July 5 in Taiwan. The album is the same as the Korean edition except a raffle ticket is included inside for Henry's Taiwanese promotions.

The Chinese version of Trap was released on August 14 and it includes a Chinese version of "Trap" and "1-4-3 (I Love You)." Both versions of "Trap" (one featuring Super Junior member Kyuhyun and one featuring Shinee member Taemin) were also included in this album.

== Promotions ==
=== Trap and title track ===
The music video of the song featured fellow labelmates Cho Kyuhyun and Lee Taemin. The video starts with Henry playing the grand piano and after whispering "I'm trapped" as he joins the background dancers in a B-boy styled choreography. The video ends with Henry going back to and playing the piano once again. A Chinese version of the music video was released on August 13.

Henry promoted the album on many music shows, including Music Bank, and Arirang Simply K-Pop. His first overseas performance was at the Hong Kong Dome Concert on July 1, 2013, in Hong Kong. A short performance of the Chinese version of "Trap" was filmed and shown on Hong Kong's TVB program, Jade Solid Gold. He was also the presenter for an award on this program.

Henry started overseas promotions in August, starting with Bangkok, Thailand and Taipei, Taiwan for his album launch. He stayed in Taiwan for seven days to attend several TV programs as a guest and a radio show. He also held a fan signing event with over 3000 fans in attendance. He also attended Super Junior's Super Show 5 in Taipei that same week as a member of Super Junior-M.

=== "1-4-3 (I Love You)" ===
On August 14, 2013, SM Entertainment announced that Lau would have follow-up promotions for a re-release of his song "1-4-3 (I Love You)" as a digital single featuring his label mate, Amber Liu of f(x). The single was released on August 23.

== Track listing ==
Credits adapted from the official homepage.

No.	Title	Lyrics	Music	Length
1.	"Trap"	Misfit	Svante Halldin, Emilh Tigerlantz, Geraldo Sandell	3:46
2.	"1-4-3 (I Love You)"	Jun Gan-di, Neil Nallas	Henry Lau, Gen Neo, Neil Nallas, Isaac Han (as Noize Bank)	3:27
3.	"My Everything"	Seo Jeong-hwan, AB&Co., Jo Yoon-kyung, Neil Nallas	Noize Bank	3:20
4.	"Ready 2 Love"	Seo Jeong-hwan, AB&Co., Neil Nallas	Noize Bank	3:19
5.	"Holiday"	Jo Yoon-kyung	Sebastian Thott, Didrik Thott, Alexander Karlsson	3:18
6.	"I Would" (English)	Kim Taesung, Andrew Choi	Yiruma, 2FACE	4:02
7.	"Trap" (featuring Kyuhyun)	Misfit	Svante Halldin, Emilh Tigerlantz, Geraldo Sandell	3:46
8.	"Trap" (featuring Taemin)	Misfit	Svante Halldin, Emilh Tigerlantz, Geraldo Sandell	3:46
Total length:				28:33

Chinese Version
No.	Title	Lyrics	Music	Length
1.	"Trap" (Chinese Version)	Liu Yuan	Svante Halldin, Emilh Tigerlantz, Geraldo Sandell	3:46
2.	"1-4-3 (I Love You)" (Chinese Version)	Lin Xin Ye	Noize Bank	3:27
3.	"My Everything"	Seo Jeong-hwan, AB&Co., Jo Yoon-kyung, Neil Nallas	Noize Bank	3:20
4.	"Ready 2 Love"	Seo Jeong-hwan, AB&Co., Neil Nallas	Noize Bank	3:19
5.	"Holiday"	Jo Yoon-kyung	Sebastian Thott, Didrik Thott, Alexander Karlsson	3:18
6.	"I Would" (English)	Kim Taesung, Andrew Choi	Yiruma, 2FACE	4:02
7.	"Trap" (featuring Cho Kyuhyun) (Chinese Version)	Liu Yuan	Svante Halldin, Emilh Tigerlantz, Geraldo Sandell	3:46
8.	"Trap" (featuring Lee Taemin) (Chinese Version)	Liu Yuan	Svante Halldin, Emilh Tigerlantz, Geraldo Sandell	3:46
Total length:				28:33

== Chart performance ==
The song "Trap" peaked at number 28 on the Gaon Digital Chart and number 18 on the Billboard Korea K-Pop Hot 100 Weekly singles. "1-4-3" reached number 35 on the Gaon chart.

=== Album chart ===
Country	Chart	Peak position
South Korea	Gaon Weekly album chart	2
South Korea	Gaon Monthly album chart	5
South Korea	Gaon Yearly album chart	47
Taiwan	G-Music Combo Chart	10
United States	Billboard World Albums	3
United States	Billboard Heatseekers	45

== Sales ==
Chart	Amount
Gaon physical sales	38,388+

== Release history ==
Country	Date	Format	Distributing label
South Korea	June 7, 2013 (Korean version)	CD, Digital download	SM Entertainment, KT Music
Taiwan	July 5, 2013 (Korean version)	CD	Avex Taiwan
Taiwan	August 14, 2013 (Chinese version)	CD	Avex Taiwan
Philippines	October 8, 2013 (Korean version)	CD	Universal Records Philippines
