= Misfit (songwriter) =

- Born: Moon Doo-ri
- Origin: South Korea
- Occupation: Songwriter
- Years active: 2010–present
- Label: SM

Moon Doo-ri, better known by her stage name as Misfit (also known as Miss Pitt), is a South Korean songwriter, lyricist and artist. She is one of the studio artists at SM Entertainment headquarters in Seoul. Misfit has penned the lyrics of songs for various SM Town artists including BoA, TRAX, Super Junior, Girls' Generation, Shinee, f(x), Red Velvet and Exo as well as Jellyfish Entertainment's VIXX.

== Career ==
=== 2010–2011: Debut as a lyricist, "Loview Music Instant" ===
Misfit made her debut in K-Pop music industry as a lyricist at S.M. Entertainment after writing the lyrics for "Up & Down" and "Ready or Not", tracks from Shinee's second studio album Lucifer. The album was released on July 19, 2010. In 2011, she wrote the lyrics of f(x)'s single "Pinocchio (Danger)" along with fellow label-mate songwriter Kenzie. The single was released on April 20, 2011. Later that year, she continued working with the agency by writing the lyrics for Super Junior's "Walkin'", a track from their fifth studio album Mr. Simple. Her first work outside the company was writing the lyrics for "Someday", a single from U-Kiss's second album Neverland which was released on September 1, 2011.

Misfit's debut as a vocal artist was her collaboration single "Loview Music Instant" with the hip hop artist, rapper and songwriter JQ. The single was digitally released on November 9, 2011. She continued her lyrical work for S.M. Entertainment by contributing her skills to the rock band TRAX's single "Blind" from their third EP and their song "Like a Dream" from 2011 Winter SMTown – The Warmest Gift.

=== 2012–2013: "Too Painful Breakup" and continued lyrical work ===
Misfit once again collaborated with JQ after featuring in his single "Too Painful Breakup" which was released on February 29, 2012. She also wrote the lyrics for Exo's songs "Two Moons" and "Machine" from their debut EP Mama which was released on April 9, 2012. Misfit also went on to hold the credit for writing half of the songs on f(x)'s second EP Electric Shock including "Beautiful Stranger", "Love Hate" and "Let's Try". The EP was released on June 10, 2012 and received critical praise for its lyrics. She also wrote "The Top" from BoA's seventh Korean album Only One. She then penned the single "Spectrum", a special stage song by SM Town dance unit for 'SBS Gayo Daejeon' that was held on the December 29, 2012.

In 2013, Misfit once again collaborated with boy group Shinee by writing the lyrics to their promotional single "Shine (Medusa I)", a song produced by Teddy Riley. The song was released with their fourth Korean album Chapter 2. Why So Serious? – The Misconceptions of Me on April 26, 2013. She also penned the Exo's "Heart Attack", a track from their first studio album XOXO which was released on June 3, 2013. Her most recent contribution to S.M. Entertainment records are the lyrics for Henry Lau's debut single "Trap" featuring Kyuhyun and Taemin. The song was released in his first EP Trap which was released on June 7, 2013. Misfit was also credited for working on "Airplane" from f(x)'s second studio album Pink Tape released on July 29, 2013.

== Discography ==
=== Collaboration singles ===
- "Loview Music Instant" (JQ and Misfit)
- "Too Painful Breakup" (JQ and Misfit)

=== As songwriter ===
This list contains songs written by Misfit, including those where she is credited as co-author.

Release Date	Song title	Singer	Album name	Peak chart positions
2010
07/19	"Up & Down"	Shinee	Lucifer	58
07/19	"Shout Out"	Shinee	Lucifer	75
07/19	"Ready or Not"	Shinee	Lucifer	71
2011
04/20	"피노키오 (Danger)"	f(x)	Pinocchio	1
08/03	"Walkin"	Super Junior	Mr. Simple	—
09/01	"Someday"	U-Kiss	Neverland	107
09/01	"Blind"	TRAX	Window	115
12/13	"Like a Dream"	TRAX	2011 Winter SMTown – The Warmest Gift	—
2012
04/09	"Two Moons"	EXO	Mama	—
04/09	"Machine"	EXO	Mama	—
06/10	"Beautiful Stranger"	f(x)	Electric Shock	29
06/10	"Love Hate"	f(x)	Electric Shock	44
06/10	"훌쩍 (Let's Try)"	f(x)	Electric Shock	47
06/22	"The Top"	BoA	Only One	62
12/30	"Spectrum"	SM The Performance	Spectrum	43
2013
04/26	"Shine (Medusa I)"	Shinee	Why So Serious? – The Misconceptions of Me	100
06/03	"Heart Attack"	EXO	XOXO	93
06/07	"Trap" ft. Kyuhyun and Taemin	Henry Lau	Trap	28
07/29	"Airplane"	f(x)	Pink Tape	16
2014
10/27	"Evanesce"	Super Junior	This Is Love	
2015
11/10	"Chained Up"	VIXX	Chained Up	8
11/10	"Maze"	VIXX	Chained Up	82
2016
04/19	"다이너마이트 Dynamite"	VIXX	Zelos	14
06/09	"Cloud 9"	EXO	Ex'Act	23
06/28	"구름 위로"	Gugudan	Act. 1 The Little Mermaid	—
06/29	"I Like U Too Much"	Sonamoo	I Like U Too Much	-
2017
02/01	"Body Talk"	Red Velvet	Rookie	-
2018
01/08	"I Hate"	Infinite	Top Seed	
