= Henry Lau =

Canadian singer-songwriter (born 1989)

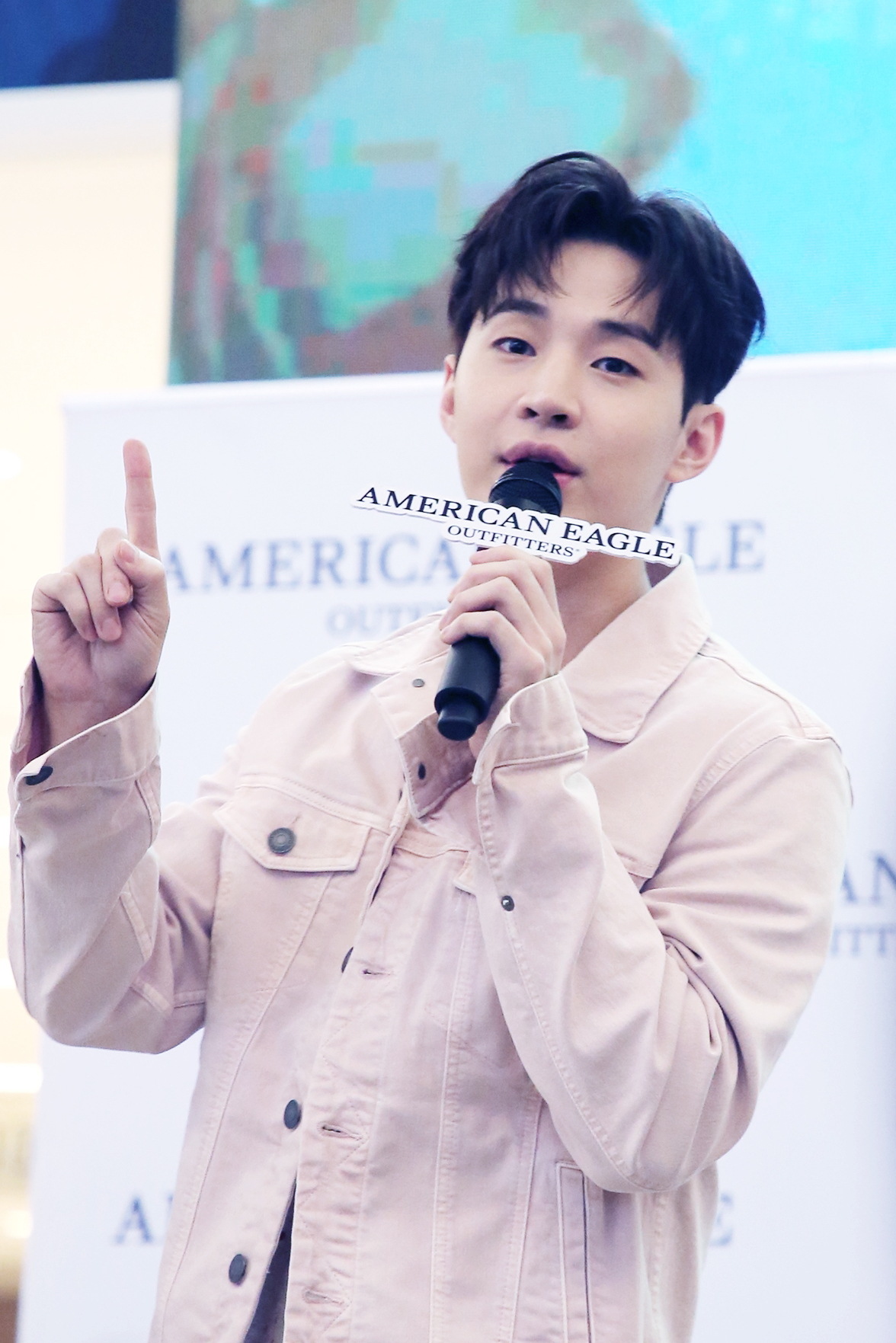
- Henry Lau in 2018
- Born: October 11, 1989 (age 37); Toronto, Ontario, Canada
- Education: Berklee College of Music
- Occupations: Singer; songwriter; musician; record producer
- Years active: 2007–present
- Musical career
- Genres: K-pop; Mandopop; R&B
- Instruments: Vocals; violin; piano; guitar; drums
- Labels: SM; Monster Entertainment Group
- Formerly of: Super Junior-M
- Website: monstergroup.co/henry/

Chinese name
- Traditional Chinese: 劉憲華
- Simplified Chinese: 刘宪华
Transcriptions
Standard Mandarin
- Hanyu Pinyin: Liú Xiàn Huá
Yue: Cantonese
- Jyutping: Lau4 Hin3-waa4
- Hong Kong Romanisation: Lau Hin-wa

Henry Lau (traditional Chinese: 劉憲華; simplified Chinese: 刘宪华; Korean: 헨리; born October 11, 1989), known mononymously as Henry, is a Canadian singer-songwriter, multi-instrumentalist, and record producer based in South Korea and China. He debuted in 2008 as a member of Super Junior-M and launched his solo career in 2013 with Trap. His song "It's You", released in 2017, became the most streamed Korean original soundtrack song on Spotify for two consecutive years in 2018 and 2019. In 2018, Henry left SM Entertainment following the expiration of his contract, and subsequently joined Monster Entertainment Group.

Henry made his Hollywood debut in 2019 with the film A Dog's Journey produced by Amblin Entertainment. In 2020, he starred in the action-fantasy movie Double World. The film was released on Netflix and the Chinese streaming service iQIYI, becoming the first movie produced in mainland China to have a simultaneous global release.

Henry is also known for his television work in the programs Real Man and I Live Alone, for which he received the Best Newcomer Award (2014) and Excellence Male Award (2017) respectively at the MBC Entertainment Awards.

== Early life ==
Henry Lau was born on October 11, 1989, in Willowdale, Toronto. His father is from Hong Kong with Teochew ancestry and his mother is from Pingtung, Taiwan. His father works in real estate while his mother was a stay-at-home mom. He has a younger sister, Whitney (born in 1993), and an older brother, Clinton (born in 1988), who is the CEO of his current label, Monster Entertainment Group. He attended Zion Heights Junior High School, then North Toronto Collegiate Institute for grade 9 and A.Y. Jackson Secondary School for the rest of his high school years. In his last year of high school, Henry was chosen at the 2006 SM Entertainment Global Audition in Toronto; he was one of two out of three thousand applicants who were recruited. He was accepted by the University of Toronto for both music education and violin performance programs, but chose not to attend after accepting SM's offer.

Henry started learning how to play the piano from his mother at the age of four, and began taking violin lessons at the age of five. His teacher was Arkady Yanivker, a soloist and former violinist of the Toronto Symphony Orchestra. He later learned to play the electric violin in 2005. He received the Canadian Royal Conservatory of Music (RCM) Regional Gold Medal for Level 10 in violin, and has also achieved Level 10 in piano. In high school, he learned a hip hop dance style called boogaloo popping. He was heads of both the after-school violin club and popping club, where he came up with the idea of simultaneously doing both after the two clubs had conflicting meeting times.

He never expected to become a singer and did not know anything about K-pop before his friends suggested him to audition for SM. For his audition, Henry performed a Vivaldi piece on the violin while incorporating popping during the piece's fast passages, as well as a cappella singing; he received an offer from the company the following week. At the time, he applied for colleges for classical music, but ultimately decided to go "down the K-pop road", as he explains, "I'll be dancing and singing, but that doesn't mean I won't be able to play the violin anymore or piano. I decided that I had to go down this road because that was the only way I could do pretty much everything." He initially declined the offer because his father wanted him to go to university. After his mother was impressed during a visit to the company in South Korea, she convinced his father for him to accept the offer.

Henry is able to speak four languages. Aside from speaking native English, he is fluent in Mandarin and Korean and can speak conversational Cantonese.

== Career ==
=== 2007–2012: Career beginnings and Super Junior-M ===
Henry appeared as a violinist in South Korean group Super Junior's music video for "Don't Don" in September 2007. The song features a violin part, which is performed by Henry. In October 2007, SM Entertainment announced that he would debut as a member of a Super Junior China sub-group, Super Junior-M, the following year. The announcement caused controversy among Super Junior fans due to rumours that SM wanted to add Henry as the fourteenth member of Super Junior, which led fans to form an "Only 13" campaign. Henry described the situation as "if Backstreet Boys wanted a new Boy," and the backlash led to him "being on the sidelines for years." Super Junior-M debuted by releasing a promotional single "U", a Mandarin remake of Super Junior's 2006 best-selling Korean single on April 8, 2008. They also debuted in China on the same day at the 8th Annual Music Chart Awards. Their debut album, Me was released on April 23, 2008. Together with the Super Junior-M members, Henry made a cameo appearance in the CCTV2 drama Stage of Youth in 2009.

A year and a half after debut, Super Junior-M made their sophomore release with the mini-album, Super Girl, on September 23, 2009. The mini-album won many awards and even earned the group a nomination for 'Best Vocal Group' at the 21st Golden Melody Awards, the Chinese equivalent of the Grammy Awards. He featured on the track "Love Me" (Chinese: 愛我; pinyin: Ài wǒ) from label-mate Zhang Liyin's first single album, Moving On, which was released on October 29, 2009. He performed on Super Junior's second Asian tour, Super Show 2, as part of Super Junior-M, and also performed a self-composed English solo song, "Sick of Love", which remains unreleased.

In 2010, he took a brief hiatus to study music composition at Berklee College of Music in Boston, Massachusetts, where he learned to sing and produce music. At Berklee, he became friends with fellow student Gen Neo, and convinced him to go to Korea to work with him.

He composed a song with Super Junior's leader Leeteuk called "All My Heart" (Korean: 진심; Revised Romanization: Jinsim) for Super Junior's fourth repackaged album, Bonamana, released on June 28, 2010. He was featured on Jonghyun and Jinho's duet titled "Don't Lie" from SM the Ballad's first album Miss You, released on November 29, 2010. Henry joined Super Junior on the Super Show 3 Tour.

Henry's solo song "Off My Mind" (Chinese: 表白; pinyin: biǎo bái) was included in Super Junior-M's second EP Perfection which was released on February 25, 2011. The lyrics to the song were written with Geo Neo while studying at Berklee. He worked with Leeteuk again on a song called "Andante" (Korean: 안단테; Revised Romanization: Andante) for Super Junior's fifth repackaged album, A-CHa, released on September 19, 2011. He toured with Super Junior as a member of Super Junior-M for their fourth tour, Super Show 4. Together with fellow Super Junior-M member Zhou Mi, he performed "Santa U Are the One" on SM Town's eighth winter album, 2011 SMTown Winter – The Warmest Gift, released on December 13, 2011.

In March 2012, he featured on BoA's single "One Dream" alongside Key which was the opening song for SBS's audition program K-pop Star. The single was included in BoA's seventh Korean studio album, Only One, released on July 22, 2012. He became a member of the project group Younique Unit with Eunhyuk, Taemin, Kai, Luhan, and Hyoyeon, for a collaboration between SM Entertainment and Hyundai. Their single "Maxstep" was released on October 31, 2012. The same year, Henry was cast as the lead in his film debut, Final Recipe, alongside Malaysian actress Michelle Yeoh. The film tells the story of young aspiring chef Mark, played by Henry, who participates in an international cooking contest to save his grandfather's restaurant from going out of business. In preparation for the role, Henry studied under chef Lee Yeon-bok and practised cooking 3–4 hours a day for several months.

=== 2013–2014: Debut as a soloist and variety shows ===
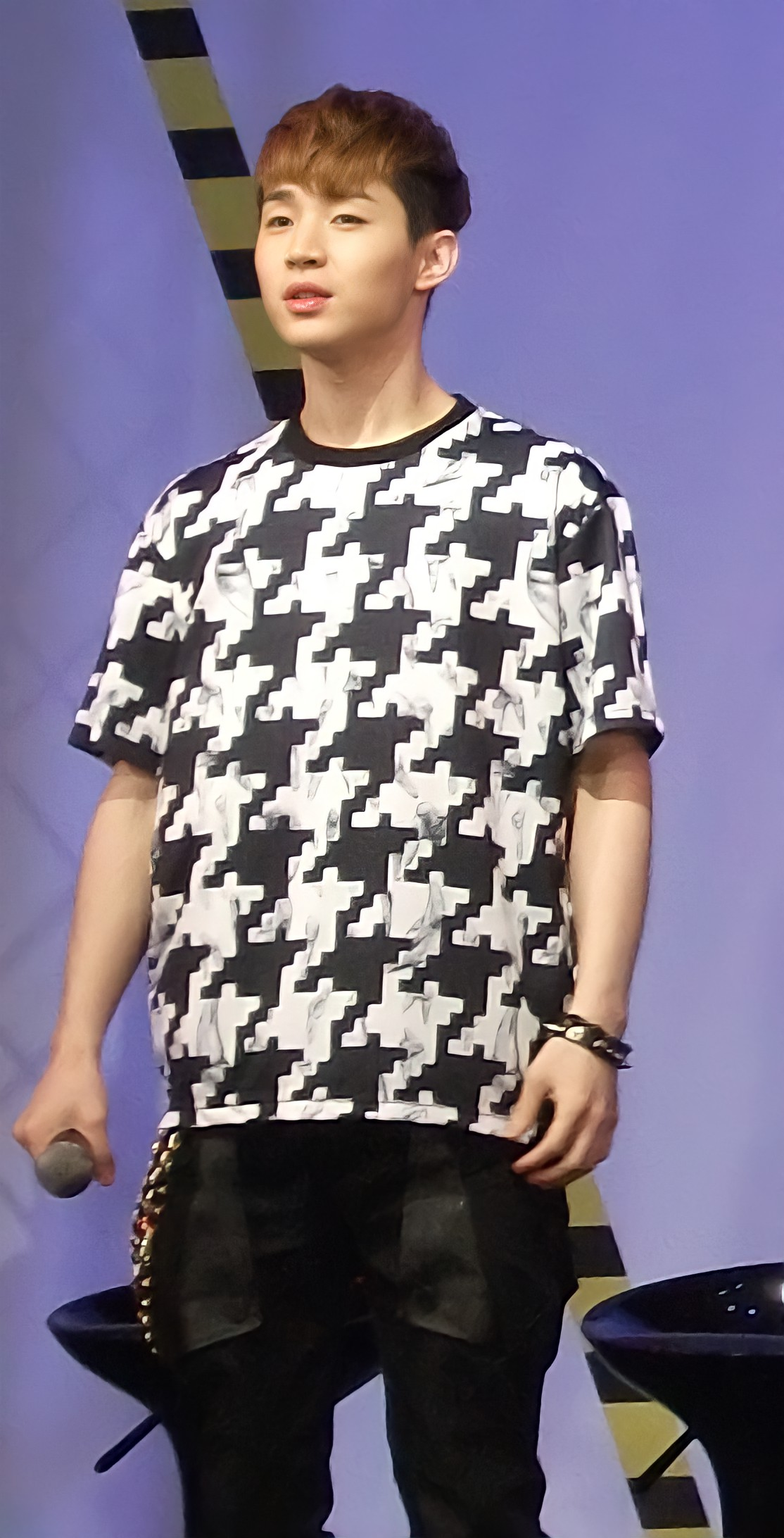
Henry in Bangkok in February 2013

Super Junior-M's second studio album, Break Down, was released on January 7, 2013, along with the title track. The album includes two songs, "Go" and "It's You", that were produced by Henry's production team, NoizeBank. NoizeBank is a music production team comprising Henry and his Berklee classmates Gen Neo, Neil Nallas, and Isaac Han. On February 6, he was confirmed to be a contestant in MasterChef Korea Celebrity, the celebrity version of MasterChef Korea.

On May 30, 2013, it was announced that Henry would make his solo debut. He was SM Entertainment's first male solo artist in 13 years since Kangta. His first solo extended play, Trap was released on June 7, 2013. The title track featured Super Junior's Kyuhyun and Shinee's Taemin. The Chinese version of the Trap EP was released on August 14. Follow-up promotions for the second single, "1-4-3 (I Love You)", which featured label-mate Amber of f(x), commenced on August 23.

In February 2014, Henry joined the cast of the Korean military-variety show Real Man with fellow celebrities Chun Jung-myung, Park Gun-hyung, K.Will. He quickly became the break-out star and variety favourite because of his natural optimism and eagerness to learn Korean culture, despite being Canadian-born and completely unfamiliar with the Korean military. In addition, his appearance in Star King along with his appearance in Real Man propelled his rising popularity. This led to more variety show and CF work, such as being chosen as the first guest in JTBC's Crime Scene, and solo endorsements with KFC Korea and Sprite Korea.

After almost seven months of production, his second EP, Fantastic was released on July 14, 2014. Henry made his Japanese debut with the single album Fantastic on October 8, which included Japanese versions of the songs "Fantastic" and "Trap". In December, he appeared in tvN's classical music variety show Always Cantare.

=== 2015–2017: Television work and single releases ===
In January 2015, Henry made his Korean acting debut in Mnet's music drama Persevere, Goo Hae-Ra. He released two songs, "The Way#Lies" and "Love +" for the drama's original soundtrack, the latter being a duet with co-star Yoo Sung-eun. Henry teased his upcoming album in February 2015 but the project was delayed for an unknown reason. In March 2015, it was confirmed that Henry had joined We Got Married and was partnered with Yewon. In June, he appeared in the second season of Always Cantare. In November, he played a supporting role in the drama Oh My Venus acting alongside So Ji-sub and Sung Hoon.

Throughout 2016, Henry became more active in China appearing in a slew of reality shows including Sisters Over Flowers 2 and Are You Normal 3, the latter of which he hosted with He Jiong. Henry co-composed the lead single of Se7en's I Am Seven, titled "Give It To Me", which was released on October 13, 2016. Next, he collaborated with Sistar's Soyou on the song "Runnin'" which was released on October 14 through SM Station. On October 26, 2016, Henry and Mark released "I Want To Enter Your Heart" for the OST of Sweet Stranger and Me; the track was written and composed by Henry.

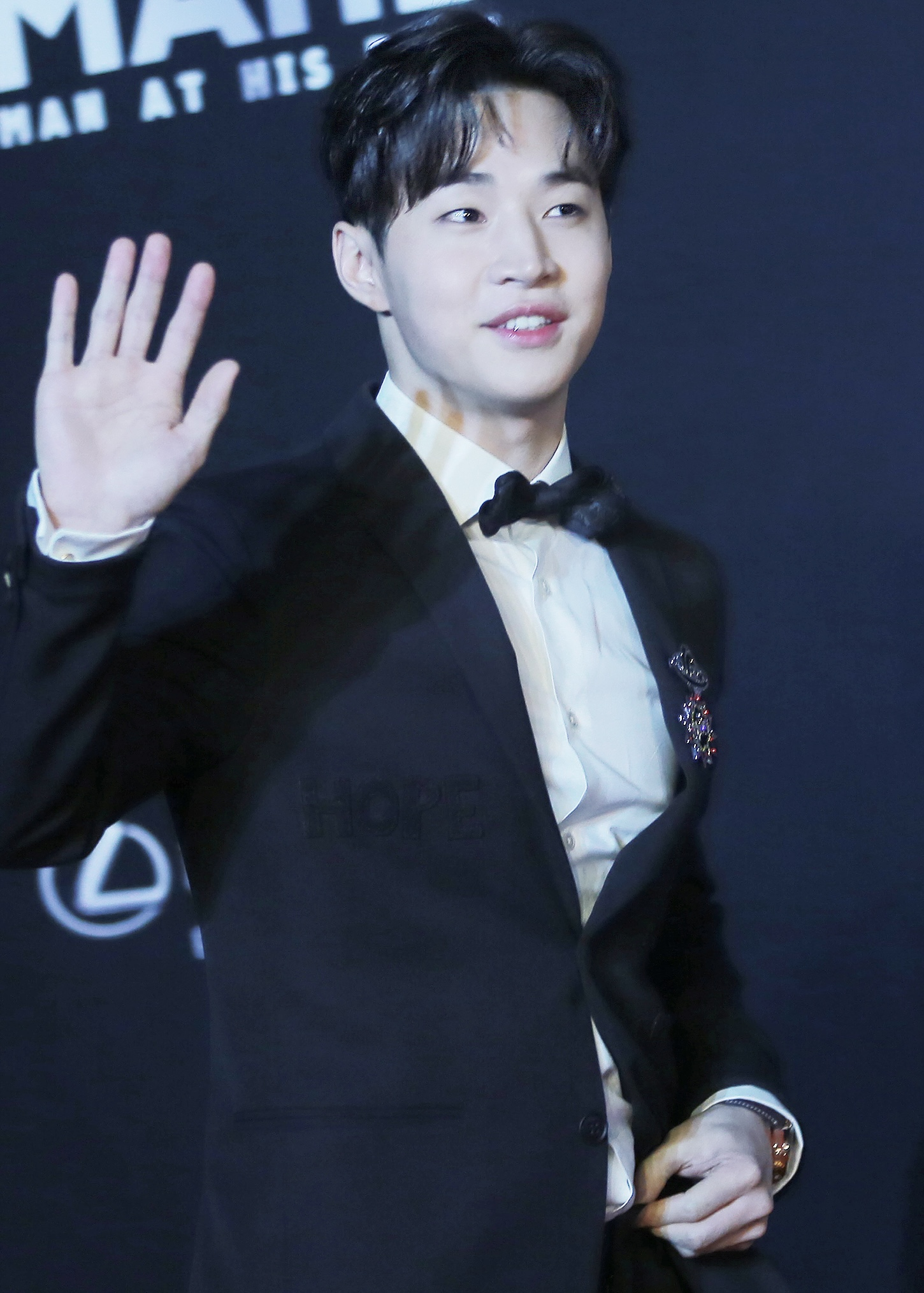
Henry at Esquire China's MAHB Awards in November 2017

Henry appeared on the Chinese reality show Back to Field, which aired in January 2017, as one of the three fixed cast members alongside He Jiong and Huang Lei. The same month, he guested on the popular South-Korean reality show I Live Alone which shows the single lifestyles of celebrities. His appearance led to an increase in the show's ratings and he attracted attention for using live loops to reinterpret "Uptown Funk". Subsequently, Henry became a fixed cast member. During his appearance on the show, he composed a brief passage of a song which was then informally titled as "What should I do?". The song continued to garner attention through his appearance on You Hee-yeol's Sketchbook for its beautiful melody and its eccentric "revolutionary" lyrics. The finished track, titled "Girlfriend" (Korean: 그리워요; Revised Romanization: Geuriwoyo) was officially released on March 18, 2017, and peaked at number one on multiple South Korean daily digital charts and number three on the Gaon Download Chart. The track is a soulful R&B piece that incorporates the sound of strings and piano. The lyrics expresses the heartfelt sadness and longing for a past lover, which correlates with the Korean title of the song "그리워요" (lit. Missing you).

On April 29, 2017, he released the single "Real Love" (Korean: 사랑 좀 하고 싶어; Revised Romanization: Sarang jom hago sipeo) and its acoustic version on May 10. On June 23, he released the single "I'm Good" featuring rapper Nafla. In July 2017, Henry joined the Naver TV variety show Snowball Project, a collaboration between artists from SM Entertainment and Mystic Entertainment. He co-produced the song "Lemonade Love" with Yoon Jong Shin, which was released by Mark and Parc Jae Jung. He also rearranged Yoon Jong Shin's 1996 song, "Rebirth", for Red Velvet and released the collaboration single "U&I" with Sunny on the show. On August 30, he released "That One". In October, he released "It's You", which he co-composed for the original soundtrack of the drama While You Were Sleeping (2017). The song became the most streamed Korean OST on Spotify for two consecutive years in 2018 and 2019. In December, he appeared on the fourth season of the Chinese reality show Perhaps Love.

=== 2018–present: Independent label, acting roles, and Journey ===
In January 2018, it was announced that Henry will arrange and perform a new version of the 1986 song "Daughter's Love" (Chinese: 女兒情; pinyin: nǚ ér qíng) for the soundtrack of the film The Monkey King 3. In February, he released the soulful R&B single "Monster" in three languages - English, Chinese, Korean. On April 30, 2018, it was announced that Henry had completed his contract with SM Entertainment and had decided to leave the agency. He then set up his own studio in China. Henry joined second season of the busking variety show Begin Again, which aired in May 2018. He returned for the second season of Chinese variety show Back to Field, which aired from April to June 2018.

The same year, he was cast in the lead role in the Chinese film adaptation of the popular video game, Zhengtu. The film, under its English title Double World, was released globally on Netflix in July 2020. In August 2018, Henry was cast as Trent in A Dog's Journey, which was released in May 2019 and marks his American film debut. He was suggested to the filmmakers by Alibaba Pictures, which co-produced the film. On October 27, Henry held his first fan-meeting at Sangmyung Art Center in Seoul. In November 2018, Henry announced that he had joined Monster Entertainment Group, an agency based in South Korea that he founded with his brother, Clinton, to help build his brand globally. Later that month, he briefly signed with AXIS, a music label founded by former YG creative director SINXITY. In December, Henry became a judge on the Chinese reality show for bel canto and classical singers Super-Vocal; the show earned high ratings. On December 26, 2018, South-Korean band g.o.d announced they would be releasing a special 20th anniversary album titled Then & Now, which will feature a remake of the group's 2001 song "Road," rearranged by MeloMance's Jung Dong-hwan and sung by Henry, IU, Urban Zakapa's Jo Hyun Ah, and Yang Da-il.

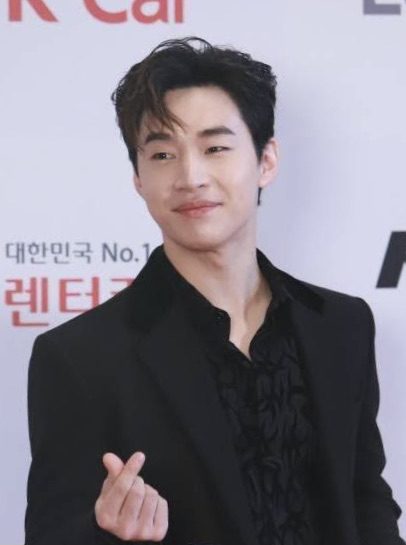
Henry at the Korea First Brand Awards in December 2019

He returned as part of the cast of Begin Again for its third season, which was broadcast in July 2019. On May 9, 2019, he released "Untitled Love Song" (Korean: 제목 없는 Love Song; Revised Romanization: Jemok eomneun Love Song), his first release under his new label Monster. He previously teased the song in April during an appearance in Idol Room. In August, he released the R&B ballad "I LUV U" which he performed live for the first time in Amalfi, Italy during the filming of Begin Again. He released the single "Don't Forget" (Korean: 한강의 밤; Revised Romanization: Hangangui bam) in October which was co-written by and features indie duo Rocoberry. He released the Chinese version of his single "I LUV U" titled "But, I Love You" (Chinese: 可是我愛你; pinyin: kě shì wǒ ài nǐ) in December. He also appeared as a judge on the Chinese reality shows Dance Smash and Miss Voice in the last quarter of the year.

In February 2020, Henry released the single "Thinking of You" and its accompanying music video in collaboration with Atelier Cologne. The same month, he featured alongside AlunaGeorge on the electropop track "Nice Things" produced by Far East Movement. In May, he was announced to participate in the fourth season of Begin Again (the first season to be held in Korea due to the pandemic), which aired from June to September. In August, he was selected by Forbes Korea as a '2020 Korea Power YouTuber' for spreading "positive influence" through his YouTube series 'Henry Together' where he collaborates with young musical prodigies. On September 17, 2020, Henry featured in "Take Over", the official song of the 2020 League of Legends World Championship, alongside Jeremy McKinnon and MAX. In October, he was confirmed to play the male lead in the second season of the American series Dramaworld, which was released on Lifetime in April 2021.

On November 18, 2020, Henry released his third EP, Journey, alongside its lead single "Radio". The album peaked at number one on the Gaon Album Chart. SeoulBeats described the album as "captivating" in their review and noted that it "[gives] nods to his complicated musical past", being a multi-instrumentalist and idol turned singer-songwriter. The writer notes Henry's "penchant for interesting instrument choices, loop peddles [sic], and electronic mixing" that makes Journey "[stand] out from most other solo releases as of late".

Henry was awarded the '2020 Art Patron of the Year' in December by the Arts Council Korea in recognition of his furtherance of arts through his original YouTube series 'Henry Together' and his role as the ambassador of Orchestra of Dream.

In August 2021, he joined the fourth season of Street Dance of China as one of the four team captains alongside Wang Yibo, Lay Zhang, and Han Geng. The same month, he released the collaboration song "Home" with Roy Wang, a track he co-composed for Wang's album Summer Time.

== Musicianship ==
Henry is a multi-instrumentalist and plays the violin, piano, drums, and guitar. He is known for his performance style which often involves the use of multiple instruments and loop pedals during live performances. He has been nicknamed "one-man band" by Chinese netizens after a viral performance at the Zhejiang TV Autumn Festival in 2019, during which he performed using live looping and played drum pads, a glass bottle, kick drum, marimba, piano, and electric violin while singing.

== Other ventures ==
=== Business ===
In May 2018, Henry opened Xiao Zhan, a Taiwanese cuisine restaurant in Sinsa-dong, Gangnam. He has since opened a second branch in Secho-dong.

=== Arts and photography ===
In October 2021, Henry's artwork was featured at the START Art Fair held at London's Saatchi Gallery as part of a special exhibit recognising K-pop's global influence.

=== Ambassadorships ===
Since 2019, he has been a Goodwill Ambassador for the nonprofit organizations International Vaccine Institute and Save the Children charity. In May 2020, the Ministry of Culture, Sports and Tourism named Henry as the promotional ambassador for El Sistema Korea, also known as Orchestra of Dream, which supports the musical education of children and young people including those who are underprivileged. Henry performed with members of the orchestra at their 10th Anniversary Concert in November 2020. In June 2021, Henry was appointed ambassador for Seoul Metropolitan Government's 2021 Instrument Donation and Sharing Campaign which aims to distribute used musical instruments to institutions and individuals in need. In March 2022, he was appointed as school violence prevention ambassador by Mapo Police Station.

== Discography ==
=== Extended plays ===
- Trap (2013)
- Fantastic (2014)
- Journey (2020)

== Awards and nominations ==
| Year | Award | Category | Result |
|---|---|---|---|
| 2005 | Canadian Royal Conservatory of Music (RCM) | Regional Gold Medal – Level 10 violin | Won |
| 2007 | Jean Lumb Awards | 10th Anniversary Commemorative Award for Outstanding Achievement | Won |
| 2013 | Mnet 20's Choice Awards | 20's Booming Star Male | Nominated |
| 2014 | World Music Awards | World's Best Male Artist | Nominated |
| 2014 | World Music Awards | World's Best Live Act | Nominated |
| 2014 | World Music Awards | World's Best Entertainer of the Year | Nominated |
| 2014 | Hong Kong IFPI Awards | Best-selling Korean/Japanese Album | Won |
| 2014 | Singapore Entertainment Awards | Asia's Rising Star | Won |
| 2014 | Singapore Entertainment Awards | Most Popular K-Pop Music Video | Won |
| 2014 | Metro Radio Mandarin Hits Music Awards | Best Male Dance Artist | Won |
| 2014 | Metro Radio Mandarin Hits Music Awards | Best Popular Idol | Won |
| 2014 | Metro Radio Mandarin Hits Music Awards | Song of the Year | Won |
| 2014 | MBC Entertainment Awards | Best Male Newcomer | Won |
| 2017 | Thailand Headlines Person of the Year Awards | Person of the Year | Won |
| 2017 | Esquire China's Man at His Best Awards | New Power of the Year | Won |
| 2017 | MBC Entertainment Awards | Excellence Male Award | Won |
| 2018 | Men's Uno Young China Awards | All-round Idol of the Year | Won |
| 2019 | MTN Ad Festival Awards | Commercial Star | Won |
| 2019 | 14th A-Awards by Arena Homme+ | Artist of the Year | Won |
| 2019 | 2020 Korea First Brand Awards | Entertainer | Won |
| 2019 | MBC Entertainment Awards | Best Couple (with Kian84) | Won |
| 2019 | MBC Entertainment Awards | Best Teamwork Award (with Kian84, Sung Hoon and Lee Si-eon) | Won |
| 2020 | Arts Council Korea | Art Patron of the Year | Won |
| 2025 | The 17th Migu Music Awards | Overseas Singer-Songwriter of the Year | Won |
