= Fantastic (EP) =

EP by Henry
- Released: July 14, 2014
- Recorded: 2014
- Studio: Doobdoob (Seoul); Lead (Seoul); Seoul; SM Big Shot (Seoul); SM Blue Ocean (Seoul); SM Yellow Tail (Seoul); T (Seoul)
- Genre: K-pop
- Length: 19:07
- Language: Korean
- Label: SM; KT Music
- Producer: Lee Soo-man; Noizebank

Henry chronology
Trap (2013)	Fantastic (2014)	Journey (2020)

Singles from Fantastic
- 1. "Fantastic" Released: July 14, 2014

Fantastic is the second EP by Canadian artist and Super Junior-M member Henry. It was released on July 14, 2014, by SM Entertainment in South Korea. The song, along with its music video was also released in Japan in Japanese under Avex Trax as his Japanese debut.

== Background ==
SM Entertainment revealed that Henry would release his second EP on July 14 and begin his promotional activities. Furthermore, it was stated that the album will contain a total of six tracks, including four written by Henry′s songwriting team, ′NoizeBank'. On July 9, the medley video highlighting the six tracks included in the mini album was revealed though SM Entertainments's official YouTube channel. An image teaser for the "Fantastic" music video was released on July 8. Henry released through several online music sites the music video for "Fantastic", the title song of his upcoming album on July 13, a day before the full album was released. "Fantastic" is described as a retro-pop song and tells the story of a self-centered man who fell in love and wants to become a real man for his loved one. Furthermore, Chanyeol of Exo, Hoya of Infinite and Seulgi of Red Velvet were revealed to be featured in the album.

Henry started his promotion for his album with appearances on Music Bank, Music Core and Inkigayo starting from July 11, 2014. The full album Fantastic was released on July 14.

== Track listing ==
Credits adapted from the official homepage.

Fantastic (Korean EP)
No.	Title	Lyrics	Music	Length
1.	"Fantastic"	Kenzie	Kenzie, Will Simms	3:32
2.	"Bad Girl" (featuring Chanyeol of EXO)	1월8일	NoizeBank	3:14
3.	"Need You Now" (featuring Hoya of Infinite)	Kenzie	Kenzie	3:14
4.	"Saturday"	Jo Yoon-kyung	NoizeBank	2:58
5.	"Butterfly" (featuring Seulgi of Red Velvet (Note: Credited as "Seulgi of SM Rookies"))	Jo Yoon-kyung	NoizeBank	3:03
6.	"자꾸자꾸 (You)"	Misfit, NoizeBank	NoizeBank	3:06
Total length:				19:07

"Fantastic" (Japanese single)
No.	Title	Music	Length
1.	"Fantastic (Japanese ver.)"	Kenzie, Will Simms	3:32
2.	"Trap (Japanese ver.)"	Svante Halldin, Emilh Tigerlantz, Geraldo Sandell	3:47
3.	"Fantastic (Instrumental)"
4.	"Trap (Instrumental)"
Total length:			7:19

Japanese DVD
No.	Title	Length
1.	"Fantastic (Japanese music video)"
2.	"Fantastic (making of)"

== Chart performance ==
=== Album ===
Country	Chart	Peak position
South Korea	Gaon Weekly album chart	2
South Korea	Gaon Monthly album chart	9
South Korea	Gaon Yearly album chart	82
Taiwan	G-Music Combo Chart	6
United States	Billboard World Albums	6

=== Singles ===
Song	Peak chart position		
Song	KOR Gaon Chart	CHN Baidu Chart	US Billboard World Digital
"Fantastic"	18	—	8
"Bad Girl"	75	18	—

== Sales ==
Chart	Amount
Gaon physical sales	22,038+

== Release history ==
Release history for Fantastic
Region	Date	Format	Label
Various	July 14, 2014	Digital download; streaming	SM
South Korea	July 14, 2014	Digital download; streaming	SM; KT
South Korea	July 16, 2014	CD	SM; KT
Taiwan (Korean version)	August 26, 2014	CD	Avex Taiwan
Japan	October 8, 2014	CD single	Avex Trax
