= Double World =

2020 Chinese-Hong Kong film by Teddy Chan

- Promotional poster
- Simplified Chinese: 征途
- Directed by: Teddy Chan
- Screenplay by: Fendou Liu; Ning Wen
- Based on: Zhengtu
- Produced by: Soi Cheang
- Starring: Henry Lau; Peter Ho; Chenhan Lin; Jiang Luxia
- Cinematography: Tao Yang
- Edited by: Yau Chi-Wai
- Music by: Peter Kam
- Production company: Filmko Entertainment
- Release dates: July 24, 2020 (mainland China); July 25, 2020 (international)
- Running time: 110 minutes
- Countries: China; Hong Kong
- Language: Mandarin
- Budget: $43 million

Double World (Chinese: 征途; pinyin: Zhēngtú; lit. 'Expedition') is a 2020 fantasy action film based on the video game Zhengtu. The film was directed by Teddy Chan and produced by Soi Cheang, and stars Henry Lau, Peter Ho, Lin Chenhan, and Jiang Luxia. Development began in 2016 and principal photography commenced in the second half of 2018.

The film was initially scheduled to be released in November 2019, but was delayed to New Year's Day 2020. Finally due to the coronavirus pandemic, the film forwent a theatrical release and was released to streaming on IQIYI in mainland China and Netflix internationally in July 2020.

== Plot ==
In the fictional Central Plains continent, the kingdoms of Southern Zhao and Northern Yan have been locked in a fierce conflict. An assassination attempt on the King of Southern Zhao reignites the war. However, Southern Zhao is lacking a Field Marshal. At Grand Tutor Guan's suggestion, a tournament is held to find a new one, with each of the eight clans of Southern Zhao sending three warriors to compete.

In the Qingyuan clan, Chu Hun (played by Peter Ho) known as a "deserter" among the villagers, and Dong Yilong (played by Henry Lau), a young orphaned thief, and a third warrior are selected. While traveling, the three are attacked by giant scorpions- Yilong and Hun surviving but the third warrior being killed. Hun explains to Yilong that he and his brother fought in a previous war against Northern Yan- Hun's entire fighting force having been killed by Northern forces after Grand Tutor Guan refused to send reinforcements, and afterwards being labelled as a deserter for being the only survivor. Grand Tutor Guan secretly meets with Wu Yang, a representative from Northern Yan revealing that he had actually been a double agent for Northern Yan, scheming to take down the other kingdom from the inside.

Chu and Dong encounter a young girl, Jinggang (played by Lin Chenhan), trying to steal a totem from another clan, who unintentionally flees her pursuers while being blown away in a sandstorm. Yilong and Hun arrive in the capital city, meeting up with the rest of the tournament contestants, along with Jinggang, who gets in (and loses) a fight over her stolen totem. Hun reveals to Yilong that he intends to kill Grand Tutor Guan for causing his brother's death. While searching for someone to replace their third team member, Jinggang tricks Hun into buying a Northern slave. Unable to find anyone else, Yilong and Hun begrudgingly let Jinggang represent the Qingyuan clan's third member. While sleeping, Hun catches their new slave attempting to kill him. She explains her name is Binu (portrayed by Jiang Luxia) and was the daughter of a commander who Hun's brother killed. Chu Hun promises to let Binu kill him once he kills Grand Tutor Guan.

The tournament begins- during the first challenge, each clan must traverse a web of chains while tied to their team members. the Zixuan clan, Qingyuan clan, and Falcon clan manage to win the round, the rest of the clans being branded as losers and being sent to return home. Chu Hun comes face to face with Grand Tutor Guan but decides not to kill him so as to not have the rest of the Qingyuan clan fail. The three are attacked by the contestants of another clan, secretly commissioned by Grand Tutor Guan, to attempt and kill them before they can reach the finals. Binu, now free, returns to her old slavemaster to free other enslaved women.

The tournament's second challenge is to steal an egg from the lair of the "Beast King"- a snake-like monster bred for war by Southern Zhao, with a crown-like headpiece embedded into its scalp. After the end of the previous war, the monster was abandoned in a mountain. Jinggang accidentally poisons Hun with a flower. Too weak to walk, he explains to his team members there is a cure inside the mountain. The Falcon clan manages to steal the egg, but are chased by the Beast King and drop it. Yilong and Jinggang grab the egg and are pursued by the Beast King, managing to collect the cure for Hun's poison in the process. The monster eventually gets stuck in a tunnel. Realizing the Beast King is in pain from its headpiece, Yilong helps remove it. After Yilong promises to bring the egg back after the competition, the monster leaves the group alone.

Grand Tutor Guan explains to the three contestants that they will have to kill each other for the honor of being Field Marshal. While debating who deserves to win, a hooded woman approaches the group, taking them to the magical "Mystic Forest" where she tells them all their problems will be solved. The voice of Yilong's late father explains that he is the heir to the throne of Northern Yan, and shall bring balance to the Central Plains. Chu Hun, enraged his team member is from Northern Yan, storms off, with Jinggang following. Binu meets Hun in the woods, explaining that she realized she had been more trapped by her hatred of Southern Zhao than her literal chains. Having changed his mind, Hun goes back to find his team members. Jinggang is attacked by Grand Tutor Guan's lackeys in the woods. Chu Hun attempts to save her, but she is killed and Hun is captured.

Dong Yilong finds and buries Jinggang. He meets with the leader of the Falcon clan and explains that Grand Tutor Guan orchestrated the entire competition to divide the clans and kill the King of Southern Zhao. Yilong asks him to find the leaders of the other clans and bring them back, to hopefully save the kingdom. Chu Hun is framed for the murder of the members of one of the clans and sentenced to execution. However, Yilong arrives and asks if he can fight Hun, under the guise of killing a traitor. Chu Hun is initially resigned to his death but is convinced by Yilong to continue fighting. Grand Tutor Guan initiates his plan, with Northern Yan soldiers hidden in the crowds swarming the cities.

Grand Tutor Guan orders the King to be brought to a Pavilion, while Hun and Yilong fight through swarms of soldiers trying to reach him. Grand Tutor Guan reveals he had actually built the Pavilion specifically to trap and kill the king. Wu Yang fights Yilong, but realizes that he is heir to the Northern Yan throne and bows to him before accidentally being killed. Chu Hun fights Grand Tutor Guan's dog, almost dying but being saved by Binu sacrificing herself. The rest of the clans arrive to assist the king. Grand Tutor Guan fills the arena with lit oil, in an attempt to steam the king to death. The leader of the Falcon clan sacrifices himself to save the king from the burning pavilion, and Hun kills Grand Tutor Guan.

After Guan's plan is foiled, Chu Hun is awarded the title of Grand Field Marshal. Jinggang is posthumously honored with a title, and Yilong returns to the Beast King to return its egg. Chu Hun and Yilong part ways, with Yilong returning to Northern Yan to reclaim his throne.

== Cast ==
- Henry Lau as Dong Yilong
- Peter Ho as Chu Hun
- Lin Chenhan as Jinggang
- Jiang Luxia as Bi Nu
- Him Law as Wen Tianyu

== Development ==
Developed by Teddy Chan, the film is based on the MMORPG game Zhengtu. The film had a reported budget of $43 million.

== Release ==
The film was released on IQIYI in China on July 24, 2020, and in other territories via Netflix on July 25, 2020. The film broke the 72-hour revenue record for paid film premieres on the Chinese streaming platform IQIYI. PR Newswire noted the film was an instant hit in China with 400 million views on its first day.

== Reception ==
Double World has a 7.8 out of 10 and a 5.1 out of 10 on Chinese review aggregator sites Maoyan and Douban respectively. James March of South China Morning Post reviewed the film giving a score of 2.5 out of 5. Kung-Fu Kingdom gave a score of 7 out of 10.
