= Jiang Yan (actress) =

Chinese actress (born 1986)

- 姜妍
- Born: 19 February 1986 (age 40); Dalian, Liaoning, China
- Education: Beijing Film Academy
- Occupation: Actress
- Years active: 2006–present

Jiang Yan (Chinese: 姜妍; pinyin: Jiāng Yán; born 19 February 1986) is a Chinese actress. A graduate of the Beijing Film Academy, she became known for her prolific work in sitcoms—earning the nickname the "Queen of Sitcoms"—and later for supporting roles in television dramas. In 2024 she won the Magnolia Award for Best Supporting Actress for her role as Yao Yuling in South to North.

== Early life and education ==
Jiang Yan was born on 19 February 1986 in Dalian, Liaoning. She studied at the Shenyang National Art School and graduated from the acting department of the Beijing Film Academy.

== Career ==
Between 2005 and 2008, Jiang performed comedy sketches on several televised Spring Festival galas. She appeared in numerous sitcoms, including Kandao Ni (低头不见抬头见), LOHAS Family and the Chinese remake of High Kick, amounting to nearly a thousand episodes, which earned her the nickname the "Queen of Sitcoms".

In 2015 she played Liu Ruoxin in the period comedy Medical Hall Comedy (医馆笑传), which raised her profile. She went on to appear in urban dramas such as Dear Ladies (2017), My Youth Meets You (2018), A Better Life (2018) and The Ideal City (2021). In 2024 her performance as Yao Yuling in South to North won her the Magnolia Award for Best Supporting Actress.

== Selected filmography ==
=== Television ===
| Year | Title | Role |
|---|---|---|
| 2010 | LOHAS Family | Xiaoxuan |
| 2011 | High Kick (Chinese version) | Xu Yahui |
| 2015 | Medical Hall Comedy | Liu Ruoxin |
| 2017 | Dear Ladies | Gu Jiayi |
| 2018 | My Youth Meets You | Li Zhaodi |
| 2018 | A Better Life | Xu Doudou |
| 2019 | The Best Partner | Mrs. Du (cameo) |
| 2021 | The Ideal City | He Yao |
| 2024 | South to North | Yao Yuling |

=== Film ===
| Year | Title | Role |
|---|---|---|
| 2026 | Vanishing Point | A Yu |

== Awards ==
| Year | Award | Category | Work | Result |
|---|---|---|---|---|
| 2024 | 29th Shanghai Television Festival Magnolia Awards | Best Supporting Actress | South to North | Won |
| 2024 | iQiyi Scream Night | Supporting Actress of the Year | — | Won |
