= Zhengtu =

- Developer(s): Zhengtu Network
- Publisher(s): Zhengtu Network
- Platform(s): Microsoft Windows
- Release: WW: 2007
- Genre(s): Massively multiplayer online role-playing game
- Mode(s): Single-player, multiplayer

Zhengtu Online (Chinese: 征途; pinyin: Zhēngtú; lit. 'Expedition') was a MMORPG developed and run by Shanghai based Zhengtu Network.

It was released in 2007 and it became a success in that same year, with a monthly profit of $15.52 million. Also in 2007, the game recorded 2.8 million daily active players and 860,265 peak concurrent users (PCU) on March 23. In 2008 it reached 1.52 million peak concurrent users, becoming the second most popular online game, after Fantasy Westward Journey with 1.66 million peak concurrent users.

Zhengtu ceased operations on 26 December 2018.

== Loot box pioneer ==
The game pioneered loot box predatory monetisation mechanics. It featured the now-canonical lock-and-key system made famous by Counter-Strike, but would also show you all the loot that a chest could contain on a circle reminiscent of Wheel of Fortune. According to the Southern Weekly article that describes ZT: "Chests will frequently contain the high-class equipment that gamers desire, but the spinning light wheel always passes over them."
