= Sisters Over Flowers (Chinese TV series) =

- Also known as: Chinese: 花样姐姐; pinyin: Huāyàng Jiějiě
- 花样姐姐; Huāyàng Jiějiě
- Genre: travel-reality show
- Based on: Sisters Over Flowers by tvN
- Starring: Xi Meijuan; Xu Fan; Wang Lin; Lin Chi-ling; Victoria; Ma Tianyu; Aarif Rahman
- Country of origin: China
- Original language: Chinese
- No. of seasons: 1
- No. of episodes: 12

Production
- Running time: About 90 minutes

Original release
- Network: SMG: Dragon Television
- Release: 15 March – 31 May 2015

Sisters Over Flowers or Jiejie Over Flowers (Chinese: 花样姐姐; pinyin: Huāyàng Jiějiě) is a Chinese travel-reality show broadcast on SMG: Dragon Television.

It starred Xi Meijuan, Xu Fan, Wang Lin, Lin Chi-ling, Victoria (eps 1-1 to 1-5), Yang Zi (eps 1-5 to 1-12), Ma Tianyu, and Aarif Rahman as they go on a 19-day backpacking trip through Turkey and Italy.

== Cast ==
=== Season 1 ===
Name	Profession	Status
Xi Meijuan	actress	Elder Sister
Xu Fan	actress	Second Sister
Wang Lin	actress	Third Sister
Lin Chi-ling	model, actress, MC	Fourth Sister
"Victoria" Song Qian (eps 1-1 to 1-5)	singer, actress, MC	Little Sister
Yang Zi (eps 1-5 to 1-12)	singer, actress	Little Sister
Ma Tianyu	singer, actor	Porter
Aarif Rahman	singer, actor	Porter

=== Season 2 ===
Name	Profession	Status
Song Dandan	actress	Elder Sister
Wang Lin	actress	Second Sister
Lin Chi-ling	model, actress, MC	Third Sister
Jiang Yan	actress	Fourth Sister
Gina Jin	actress	Little Sister
Aarif Rahman (eps 2-1 to 2-6)	singer, actor	Porter
Henry Lau	singer	Porter
Zeng Shunxi (eps 2-5 to 2-12)	actor	Porter
