= List of LG laptops =

This is a list of laptops manufactured by LG Electronics. LG's laptop business started in 1995 in a joint venture with IBM, releasing ThinkPads in South Korea.

== Xnote ==
Xnote logo

Xnote (Korean: 엑스노트) was a notebook computer series made by LG, originally being part of an LG and IBM joint venture. After severing ties in 2005, LG still produced the Xnote series (in some markets they were not sold under the Xnote name) till 2013, when LG discontinued the netbook/laptop lineup.

=== A series ===
The A510 was released in October 2010. This model has a 3D display and came with glasses.

The LG Xnote A540 launched in 2012 and featured a glasses-free 3D display.

=== Express LW40 ===
Xnote Express LW40 (2005) was the first ever notebook computer capable of receiving terrestrial DMB television.

=== LT20 series ===
LT20 is a semi-rugged netvertible tablet computer with Windows XP.

=== N series ===
LG N450 and N550 were introduced in 2012. They both have a HD+ resolution display, AMD Radeon HD 7650M graphics, and run on 3rd generation Intel Core i5 or i7.

=== P series ===
The Xnote P300 announced at the end of 2007 was a top end model with a 2.2 GHz Intel Core 2 Duo T7500 processor, 2GB RAM, 250GB HDD, HDMI out, optical disc drive, camera and WWAN.

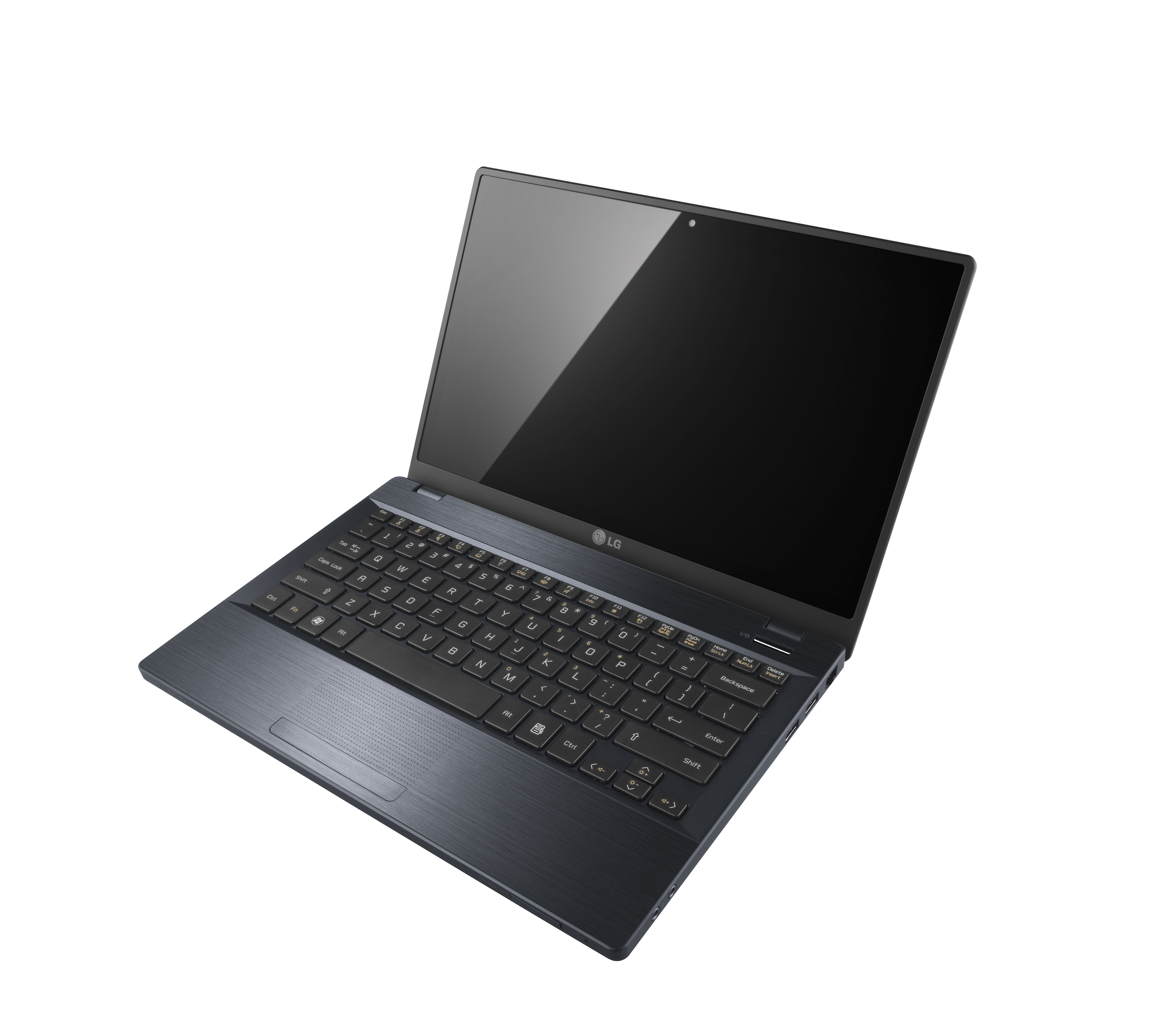
LG Xnote P330

Announced at the CES 2011 trade show, the LG P210 notebook had what LG claimed were the "world's thinnest bezels". This was followed by the P220.

Unveiled in November 2011, the P330 came with 2nd generation Intel Core i5 or i7 processors, Nvidia GeForce 555M graphics card and had a 13.3", 1366 x 768 (16:9), 120.55 ppi LED Back-Light display.

=== Z series ===
Released in 2012, the Z330 ultrabook had a 13.3 inch screen while its larger 15.6 inch variant was named Z430.

=== U560 ===
Released in 2013.

=== X100 netbooks ===
X110, X120 and X130 were netbooks released in 2009.

=== Z1 series ===
Z1-2007 released in 2007

Express dual series

Express dual series was released in 2005.

==== P1 express dual ====
The LG p1 express dual contained an Intel Core Duo Processor T2500 and 512MB of ram pre installed. It came with Windows XP. The screen was an LCD 15.7" display. It was released for AUD$2900.

==== S1 express dual ====
The LG S1 express dual cost circa AUD$3999. It had a 15.7" display.

==== M1 express dual ====
The LG M1 express dual had around a 15" display. It was cheaper than the P1 express dual.

==== T1 express dual ====
The T1 Express dual had a 14.7" display. It was the cheapest laptop in the LG Express dual series v1.0.

== Gram ==
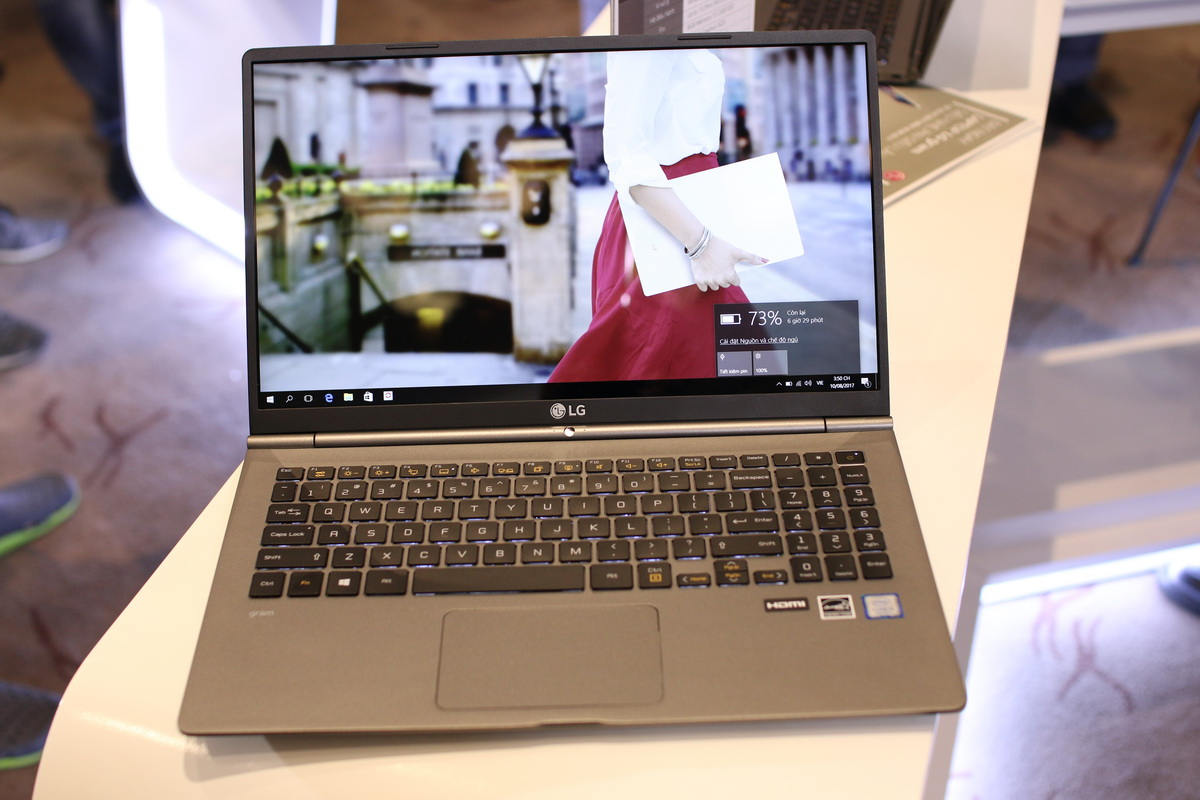
17" LG Gram

The LG Gram is a lineup of laptop computers weighing around 1 kg manufactured by LG electronics.

The Gram was announced in September 2015 with two screen sizes available: 13.3" and 14". A 15.6" model was introduced during CES 2016. During CES 2017, the 2017 edition of the Gram was introduced. During CES 2018, the 2018 edition of the Gram was introduced. During CES 2019, a larger 17" Gram alongside a 14" 2-in-1 Gram was introduced. Gram's marketing is held with the light weight of it. As the weight 980 gram is the maximum weight that it could have in all condition, LG was famous for its modest marketing in Korea. During CES 2021, a larger 16" Gram alongside a 16" 2-in-1 Gram was introduced.

== Concepts ==
LG E-Book is a proof of concept design that was presented by LG in 2006. Two prototypes have been built so far, but a release date was never announced. The laptop uses an organic light-emitting diode screen instead of the traditional LCD. The laptop is powered by a methyl alcohol solution instead of the more conventional Li-ion batteries seen in contemporary laptops. It had a keypad made of a single OLED panel similar to LG Chocolate phone.
