= Always Cantare =

2014–2015 South Korean TV series

- Genre: Music-Variety
- Country of origin: South Korea
- Original language: Korean
- No. of seasons: 2
- No. of episodes: 4 episodes (Season 1); 7 episodes (Season 2)

Production
- Production location: South Korea
- Running time: 65 minutes

Original release
- Network: tvN
- Release: December 5, 2014 – August 1, 2015

Always Cantare (Korean: 언제나 칸타레) is a 2014 South Korean television program. The first season consists of 4 episodes and aired on tvN from December 5 to 26, 2014. The second season began on June 20, 2015 and airs on Wednesdays at 23:00.

== Ratings ==
In the ratings below, the highest rating for the show will be in red, and the lowest rating for the show will be in blue each year.

- Ratings released by AGB Nielsen Korean and TnMS.

Episode #	Original Airdate	TNmS Ratings		AGB Ratings	
Episode #	Original Airdate	Nationwide	Seoul National Capital Area	Nationwide	Seoul National Capital Area
1	December 5			2.215%	
2	December 12			1.768%	
3	December 19			1.700%	
4	December 26			1.515%	
