= Begin Again (South Korean TV program) =

2017 South Korean television series

- Promotional poster for Season 1
- Genre: Music; Reality; Documentary; Travel
- Starring: See below
- Country of origin: South Korea
- Original language: Korean
- No. of seasons: 4
- No. of episodes: 51

Production
- Production locations: South Korea, Ireland, England, Switzerland, France, Portugal, Hungary, Italy, Germany, Netherlands
- Running time: 90-120 minutes

Original release
- Network: JTBC
- Release: June 25, 2017 – December 22, 2020
- Release: January 6 – February 10, 2023

Begin Again (Korean: 비긴어게인) is a South Korean television program which airs on JTBC.

Season 1 aired on Sundays at 22:30 (KST) from June 25 to September 10, 2017.

Season 2 aired on Fridays at 21:20 (KST) from March 30 to June 29, 2018.

Season 3 aired on Fridays at 21:00 (KST) from July 19 to November 8, 2019.

Season 4, also known as Begin Again Korea (비긴어게인 코리아) aired on Saturdays at 23:00 (KST), from June 6 to July 4, 2020, and on Sundays at 23:00 (KST) from July 12 to August 9.

A New Year Special series, also known as Begin Again - Intermission (비긴어게인 - 인터미션), aired on Fridays at 22:30 (KST), beginning January 6 to February 10, 2023.

== Airtime ==
Season	Air date	Airtime
1	June 25 – September 10, 2017	Sundays at 10:30 PM KST
2	March 30 – June 29, 2018	Fridays at 9:20 PM KST
3	July 19 – November 8, 2019	Fridays at 9:00 PM KST
4 (Begin Again Korea)	June 6 – July 4, 2020	Saturdays at 11:00 PM KST
4 (Begin Again Korea)	July 12 – August 9, 2020	Sundays at 11:00 PM KST
New Year Special	January 6 – February 10, 2023	Fridays at 10:30 PM KST

== Overview ==
Reputable musicians from South Korea travel overseas, to places where no one knows anything about them, and hold busking events. They would introduce themselves to the people in other countries through their performances.

For Season 4 (Begin Again Korea), different from the previous 3 seasons, the cast members travel around South Korea to conduct Social Distancing Busking. The main purpose is to present music as a gift, to console the Korean citizens who have gone through difficult times due to the current COVID-19 pandemic.

== Spin-offs ==
A year-end special titled Begin Again Reunion (비긴어게인Reunion) aired on December 22, 2020, with the lineup featuring Yoon Do-hyun, Lim Heon-il, Paul Kim, Henry, Lee Hi and Lee Su-hyun.

An online version of the show Begin Again Open Mic (비긴어게인 오픈마이크) was launched, and videos are uploaded on the show's YouTube channel on Mondays and Wednesdays at 18:00 (KST) beginning May 11, 2021. Originally, Begin Again Open Mic was aired on JTBC from December 29, 2020, to February 11, 2021.

A New Year Special titled Begin Again - Intermission (비긴어게인 - 인터미션) aired from January 6, 2023, to February 10, 2023, with two lineups airing interwoven. Group 1 featured Lena Park, Kim Jong-wan (Nell), Kang Min-kyung (Davichi), John Park, Choi Jung-hoon (Jannabi), Kim Do-hyung (Jannabi) and Jeong Dong-hwan (MeloMance) while Group 2 featured Yim Jae-beom, Ha Dong-kyun, Kim Feel, Heize, Hynn, Sungha Jung and Kim Hyun-woo (DickPunks).

== Cast ==
Season 1 (Begin Us)

- Lee So-ra
- You Hee-yeol (Toy)
- Yoon Do-hyun (YB)
- Noh Hong-chul

Season 2 (Team Kim Yoon-ah)

- Kim Yoon-ah (Jaurim)
- Lee Sun-kyu (Jaurim)
- Yoon Gun
- Roy Kim
- Jeong Se-woon (Episode 5–7)

Season 2 (Team Lena Park/Family Band) (Note: Audio director of the show Lee Joon joins the team as the guitarist)

- Lena Park
- Hareem
- Henry
- Lee Su-hyun (AKMU)

Season 3 (Family Band)

- Lena Park
- Hareem
- Henry
- Lee Su-hyun (AKMU)
- Lim Heon-il
- Kim Feel

Season 3 (Dick2JukPaulTaeng)

- Lee Juck
- Taeyeon (Girls' Generation)
- Paul Kim
- Jukjae
- Kim Hyun-woo (DickPunks)

Season 4 (Begin Again Korea) (Note: Audio director of the show Jung Ji-chan occasionally appears as part of the performing crew)

- Lee So-ra (Episode 1–5)
- Hareem
- Henry
- Lee Su-hyun (AKMU)
- Jukjae
- Crush (Episode 1–3, 8–10)
- Jung Seung-hwan
- Lee Hi (Episode 4–6, 10)
- Sohyang (Episode 6–10)

Begin Again - Intermission - Group 1

- Lena Park
- Kim Jong-wan (Nell)
- Kang Min-kyung (Davichi)
- John Park
- Choi Jung-hoon (Jannabi)
- Kim Do-hyung (Jannabi)
- Jeong Dong-hwan (MeloMance)

Begin Again - Intermission - Group 2

- Yim Jae-beom
- Ha Dong-kyun
- Kim Feel
- Heize
- Hynn
- Sungha Jung
- Kim Hyun-woo (DickPunks)

== Episodes ==
Season 1

Episode	Broadcast Date	Busking Place(s)	Note(s)
1	June 25, 2017	Ireland (Dublin, Galway, Slade Castle, Cliffs of Moher)	—
2	July 2, 2017	Ireland (Dublin, Galway, Slade Castle, Cliffs of Moher)	—
3	July 9, 2017	Ireland (Dublin, Galway, Slade Castle, Cliffs of Moher)	—
4	July 16, 2017	Ireland (Dublin, Galway, Slade Castle, Cliffs of Moher)	—
5	July 23, 2017	England (Chester, Liverpool, Manchester)	—
6	July 30, 2017	England (Chester, Liverpool, Manchester)	—
7	August 6, 2017	England (Chester, Liverpool, Manchester)	—
8	August 13, 2017	England (Chester, Liverpool, Manchester)	—
9	August 20, 2017	Switzerland (Montreux)	—
10	August 27, 2017	Switzerland (Montreux)	Bassist Hwang Ho-gyu, drummer Lee Sang-min and YB guitarist Heo Jun joins Begin Us for the Montreux Jazz Festival
11	September 3, 2017	Switzerland (Montreux)	Bassist Hwang Ho-gyu, drummer Lee Sang-min and YB guitarist Heo Jun joins Begin Us for the Montreux Jazz Festival
12	September 10, 2017	France (Chamonix)	—

Season 2

Episode	Broadcast Date	Team	Busking Place(s)	Note(s)
1	March 30, 2018	Team Kim Yoon-ah	Portugal (Lisbon, Porto, Cascais)	—
2	April 6, 2018	Team Kim Yoon-ah	Portugal (Lisbon, Porto, Cascais)	—
3	April 13, 2018	Team Kim Yoon-ah	Portugal (Lisbon, Porto, Cascais)	—
4	April 20, 2018	Team Kim Yoon-ah	Portugal (Lisbon, Porto, Cascais)	—
5	May 4, 2018	Team Kim Yoon-ah	Portugal (Lisbon, Porto, Cascais)	No episode on April 27, 2018; Jeong Se-woon joins the team
6	May 11, 2018	Team Kim Yoon-ah	Portugal (Lisbon, Porto, Cascais)	Roy Kim leaves the team due to studies at the end of the episode
7	May 18, 2018	Team Kim Yoon-ah	Portugal (Lisbon, Porto, Cascais)	Team Lena Park is shown for the last 30 minutes of the episode
8	May 25, 2018	Team Lena Park	Portugal (Aroeira, Lisbon)	—
9	June 1, 2018	Team Lena Park	Portugal (Aroeira, Lisbon)	—
10	June 8, 2018	Team Lena Park	Portugal (Aroeira, Lisbon)	—
11	June 15, 2018	Team Lena Park	Hungary (Budapest)	—
12	June 22, 2018	Team Lena Park	Hungary (Budapest)	Henry leaves the team due to other schedules at the end of the episode
13	June 29, 2018	Team Lena Park	Hungary (Budapest)	—

Season 3

Episode	Broadcast Date	Team	Busking Place(s)	Note(s)
1	July 19, 2019	Family Band	South Korea (Seoul)	—
2	July 26, 2019	Family Band	Italy (Sorrento, Naples, Positano, Ravello, Amalfi)	—
3	August 2, 2019	Family Band	Italy (Sorrento, Naples, Positano, Ravello, Amalfi)	—
4	August 9, 2019	Family Band	Italy (Sorrento, Naples, Positano, Ravello, Amalfi)	—
5	August 16, 2019	Family Band	Italy (Sorrento, Naples, Positano, Ravello, Amalfi)	Lee Su-hyun temporarily leaves the team at the end of the episode
6	August 23, 2019	Family Band	South Korea (Seoul)	Special performers: Jung Hae-in, Kim Go-eun (Note: Both are promoting Tune in for Love on the show)
7	August 30, 2019	Second Team (Dick2JukPaulTaeng)	Germany (Berlin)	Special appearance by Henry
8	September 6, 2019	Second Team (Dick2JukPaulTaeng)	Germany (Berlin)	—
9	September 20, 2019	Second Team (Dick2JukPaulTaeng)	Germany (Berlin)	Special appearance by bassoonist You Sung-kwon
10	September 27, 2019	Second Team (Dick2JukPaulTaeng)	Germany (Berlin)	—
11	October 4, 2019	Family Band	Italy (Verona, Sirmione)	—
12	October 11, 2019	Family Band	Italy (Verona, Sirmione)	Lee Su-hyun returns to the team
13	October 18, 2019	Family Band	Italy (Verona, Sirmione)	—
14	October 25, 2019	Family Band	Italy (Verona, Sirmione)	—
15	November 1, 2019	Second Team (Dick2JukPaulTaeng)	Netherlands (Amsterdam)	—
16	November 8, 2019	Second Team (Dick2JukPaulTaeng)	Netherlands (Amsterdam)	—

Season 4 (Begin Again Korea)

Episode	Broadcast Date	Busking Place(s)	Note(s)
1	June 6, 2020	Incheon International Airport, Culture Tank	
2	June 13, 2020	Daegu (Keimyung University Dongsan Medical Center, Keimyung University Daemyeong Campus, Suseong Pond)	The cast had split into 2 teams in the day, namely; Cr-Reem-Lee (Lee So-ra, Hareem, Crush); Sunshine Band (Henry, Lee Su-hyun, Jukjae, Jung Seung-hwan)
3	June 20, 2020	Daegu (Suchang Youth Mansion, Daegu Stadium)	
4	June 27, 2020	Gangwon Province (Sokcho Deungdae Beach, Sokcho H Cruise)	
5	July 4, 2020	Gangwon-do (Gangneung Movie Village, Pyeongchang County Mountain Cinema)	
6	July 12, 2020	North Gyeongsang Province (Pohang Steel Mill, Andong Woryeonggyo Bridge)	
7	July 19, 2020	Busan (Cheongsapo Port, F1963, Songdo Beach)	Special performers: Lee Nau (Purple Rain), Hong Jin-ho (Hoppipolla)
8	July 26, 2020	Jeonju, North Jeolla Province (Jeonbuk National University, Jeonju Nambu Market Youth Mall, Gyeonggijeon)	Special performers: Lee Nau (Purple Rain), Park Da-som (Dancer)
9	August 2, 2020	Seoul (Mokdong Ice Rink, Seoul Botanic Park)	
10	August 9, 2020	Seoul (Camping in the city by Walkerhill, Seoul Marina Club & Yacht)	Special performer: Hong So-jin

== Discography ==
Recordings of some of the busking songs were released digitally on various music sites.

=== Season 1 ===
Season 1

Episode 2

No.	Title	Music	Artist	Length
1.	"With Or Without You (Slade Castle Ver.)"	Yoon Do-hyun; You Hee-yeol	Yoon Do-hyun	04:00
2.	"Falling Slowly (Slade Castle Ver.)"	Yoon Do-hyun; You Hee-yeol	Lee So-ra, Yoon Do-hyun	03:42
Total length:				07:42

Episode 3

No.	Title	Music	Artist	Length
1.	"Pop Medley with Moon River (Galway Pub Ver.)" (Moon River 외 POP 메들리)	Yoon Do-hyun; You Hee-yeol	Lee So-ra	05:07
2.	"A Flying Butterfly (Galway First Busking Ver.)" (나는 나비)	Yoon Do-hyun; You Hee-yeol	Yoon Do-hyun	03:24
Total length:				08:31

Episode 4

No.	Title	Music	Artist	Length
1.	"To Find You (Galway Final Busking Ver.)"	Yoon Do-hyun; You Hee-yeol	Yoon Do-hyun	03:30
2.	"Knockin' on Heaven's Door (Galway Final Busking Ver.)"	You Hee-yeol	Begin Us	06:45
3.	"(Bonus Track) Don't Leave Me By My Side (Slade Castle Ver.)" (내 곁에서 떠나가지 말아요)	You Hee-yeol	Lee So-ra	05:13
Total length:				15:28

Episode 5

No.	Title	Music	Artist	Length
1.	"Real Man (English Ver.) (Chester Busking Ver.)" (상남자)	Yoon Do-hyun	Yoon Do-hyun	03:39
2.	"Will You Still Love Me Tomorrow (Chester Busking Ver.)"	Yoon Do-hyun; You Hee-yeol	Lee So-ra	03:45
Total length:				07:24

Episode 6

No.	Title	Music	Artist	Length
1.	"My Soul (English Ver.) (Liverpool Busking Ver.)" (당신이 만든 날씨)	Yoon Do-hyun; You Hee-yeol	Yoon Do-hyun	04:28
2.	"To You Who Don't Love Me (Liverpool Busking Ver.)" (나를 사랑하지 않는 그대에게)	You Hee-yeol	Lee So-ra	04:23
3.	"The Scientist (Liverpool Busking Ver.)"	Yoon Do-hyun; You Hee-yeol	Yoon Do-hyun	04:37
Total length:				13:28

Episode 7

No.	Title	Music	Artist	Length
1.	"Come Together (The Cavern Club Ver.)"	Yoon Do-hyun; You Hee-yeol; Noh Hong-chul	Lee So-ra, Yoon Do-hyun	04:31
2.	"Across the Universe (The Cavern Club Ver.)"	Yoon Do-hyun; You Hee-yeol	Lee So-ra	03:43
Total length:				08:14

Episode 8

No.	Title	Music	Artist	Length
1.	"Don't Look Back in Anger (Manchester Busking Ver.)"	Yoon Do-hyun; You Hee-yeol	Lee So-ra	04:35
2.	"Imagine (Manchester Busking Ver.)"	Yoon Do-hyun; You Hee-yeol	Lee So-ra, Yoon Do-hyun	03:43
Total length:				08:18

Episode 9

No.	Title	Music	Artist	Length
1.	"Come To Me (Montreux Busking Ver.)" (내게 와 줘)	Yoon Do-hyun; You Hee-yeol	Yoon Do-hyun	04:03
2.	"Date (Montreux Busking Ver.)" (데이트)	Yoon Do-hyun; You Hee-yeol; Noh Hong-chul	Lee So-ra	03:24
3.	"Today (Montreux busking Ver.)" (오늘은)	Yoon Do-hyun; You Hee-yeol; Noh Hong-chul	Yoon Do-hyun	03:59
4.	"Love of My Life (Montreux Busking Ver.)"	You Hee-yeol	Lee So-ra	03:29
Total length:				14:55

Episode 10

No.	Title	Music	Artist	Length
1.	"Stay Alive (Montreux Jazz Festival Street Ver.)"	Yoon Do-hyun; Heo Jun; Lee Sang-min	Yoon Do-hyun	04:26
Total length:				04:26

Episode 11

No.	Title	Music	Artist	Length
1.	"To Live In This Land (Montreux Jazz Festival Ver.)" (이 땅에 살기 위하여)	You Hee-yeol; Heo Jun; Hwang Ho-gyu; Lee Sang-min	Yoon Do-hyun	04:45
2.	"I Remember (Montreux Jazz Festival Ver.)"	You Hee-yeol; Heo Jun; Hwang Ho-gyu; Lee Sang-min	Yoon Do-hyun	03:40
Total length:				08:25

Episode 12

No.	Title	Music	Artist	Length
1.	"Track 3 (Chamonix Busking Ver.)"	Yoon Do-hyun; You Hee-yeol	Lee So-ra	03:52
2.	"The Blue In You (Chamonix Busking Ver.)" (그대안의 블루)	You Hee-yeol	Lee So-ra, Yoon Do-hyun	03:36
3.	"The Dreaming Girl Two (Chamonix Busking Ver.)" (꿈꾸는 소녀 Two)	Yoon Do-hyun; You Hee-yeol	Yoon Do-hyun	04:08
4.	"Raining Blossom (Chamonix Busking Ver.)" (꽃비)	Yoon Do-hyun; You Hee-yeol	Yoon Do-hyun	03:12
5.	"Autumn In Front Of The Post Office (Chamonix Busking Ver.)" (가을 우체국 앞에서)	Yoon Do-hyun; You Hee-yeol	Yoon Do-hyun	04:44
6.	"Bless You (Chamonix Busking Ver.)" (축복합니다)	Yoon Do-hyun; You Hee-yeol	Begin Us	03:57
Total length:				23:29

=== Season 2 ===
Season 2

Jaurim Begin Again: Porto Live

No.	Title	Artist	Length
1.	"Fly Me to the Moon"	Kim Yoon-ah; Lee Sun-kyu	03:07
2.	"River" (강)	Kim Yoon-ah	04:15
3.	"Shining" (샤이닝)	Kim Yoon-ah; Lee Sun-kyu	03:40
4.	"#1"	Kim Yoon-ah; Lee Sun-kyu	04:50
Total length:			15:52

Jaurim Begin Again: Lisbon Live

No.	Title	Artist	Length
1.	"When Spring Comes" (봄이 오면)	Kim Yoon-ah; Lee Sun-kyu	03:51
2.	"Consolation" (위로)	Kim Yoon-ah; Lee Sun-kyu	03:40
3.	"Twenty Five, Twenty One" (스물다섯, 스물하나)	Kim Yoon-ah; Lee Sun-kyu	04:34
Total length:			12:05

Jaurim Begin Again: Portugal Live 2CD

No.	Title	Artist	Length
1.	"Gloomy Sunday"	Kim Yoon-ah; Lee Sun-kyu	02:45
2.	"Goodbye Mimi" (안녕 미미)	Kim Yoon-ah; Lee Sun-kyu	03:11
3.	"One Fine Spring Day" (봄날은 간다)	Kim Yoon-ah; Lee Sun-kyu	04:08
4.	"Spring In My Hometown" (고향의 봄)	Kim Yoon-ah; Lee Sun-kyu	02:06
5.	"Nocturne" (야상곡)	Kim Yoon-ah; Lee Sun-kyu	02:48
6.	"Going Home"	Kim Yoon-ah; Lee Sun-kyu	03:57
7.	"Moon River"	Kim Yoon-ah; Lee Sun-kyu	02:56
8.	"Shining" (샤이닝)	Kim Yoon-ah; Lee Sun-kyu	02:42
Total length:			24:33

Roy Kim Live in Begin Again 2

No.	Title	Artist	Length
1.	"Gravity"	Roy Kim	04:40
2.	"Yellow"	Roy Kim	04:27
3.	"Love Yourself"	Roy Kim	03:44
4.	"Hallelujah"	Roy Kim	03:34
5.	"Stay with Me"	Roy Kim	02:55
6.	"Fix You"	Roy Kim	04:45
7.	"Daughters"	Roy Kim	03:17
8.	"Only If" (상상해봤니)	Roy Kim	03:33
9.	"Those Days" (그날들)	Roy Kim	04:15
Total length:			35:10

Begin Again 2 Yoon Gun Special Edition

No.	Title	Artist	Length
1.	"Walking To You (Live)" (걷다 (라이브))	Yoon Gun	03:54
2.	"Raining Apgujeong (Live)" (비오는 압구정 (라이브))	Yoon Gun	02:04
Total length:			05:58

=== Season 3 ===
Season 3

Episode 1

No.	Title	Artist	Length
1.	"It's You (Seoul Busking Ver.)"	Henry; Lena Park; Hareem; Lim Heon-il	03:32
2.	"Consolation (Seoul Busking Ver.)" (위로)	Hareem	03:29
Total length:			07:01

Episode 2

No.	Title	Artist	Length
1.	"Love One (Sorrento Da Emilia Live Ver.)" (사랑 하나)	Kim Feel; Lena Park; Lee Su-hyun; Hareem; Lim Heon-il; Henry	03:32
Total length:			03:32

Episode 3

No.	Title	Artist	Length
1.	"Incurable Disease (Naples Toledo Metro Station Live Ver.)" (난치병)	Hareem	04:09
Total length:			04:09

Episode 4

No.	Title	Artist	Length
1.	"There's Nothing Holdin' Me Back (Ravello Busking Ver.)"	Henry; Lena Park; Lee Su-hyun; Kim Feel; Hareem; Lim Heon-il	02:32
2.	"One Day (Amalfi Beach Busking Ver.)" (어느 날)	Hareem; Lena Park; Lim Heon-il; Henry; Kim Feel; Lee Su-hyun	04:11
Total length:			06:43

Episode 5

No.	Title	Artist	Length
1.	"Thinking Out Loud (Sorrento Rooftop Bar Busking Ver.)"	Henry; Kim Feel; Hareem; Lim Heon-il	02:53
2.	"That Kind Of You, That Kind Of Me (Sorrento Corso Italia Busking Ver.)" (그런 너, 그런 나)	Hareem; Lena Park; Lim Heon-il	03:14
3.	"Pierrot (Sorrento Rooftop Bar Busking Ver.)" (광대)	Kim Feel; Lena Park; Hareem; Lim Heon-il; Henry	05:39
Total length:			11:46

Episode 7

No.	Title	Artist	Length
1.	"View (Berlin First Busking Ver.)"	Jukjae	04:04
Total length:			04:04

Episode 8

No.	Title	Artist	Length
1.	"Not Going Anywhere (Berlin Friedrichs Bridge Busking Ver.)"	Jukjae	03:42
2.	"Let's Go See The Stars (Berlin Monbijou Park Busking Ver.)" (별 보러 가자)	Jukjae; Kim Hyun-woo	05:19
Total length:			09:01

Episode 9

No.	Title	Artist	Length
1.	"Day By Day (Berlin Terrace Live Ver.)"	Paul Kim; Jukjae	02:38
2.	"She Said (Berlin Tiergarten Busking Ver.)" (사랑한대)	Jukjae; Kim Hyun-woo	04:26
Total length:			07:04

Episode 10

No.	Title	Artist	Length
1.	"Confession (Berlin Mauerpark Busking Ver.)" (고백)	Jukjae; Kim Hyun-woo	04:42
Total length:			04:42

Episode 11

No.	Title	Artist	Length
1.	"Fake Plastic Trees (Verona Piazza Bra Busking Ver.)"	Lim Heon-il; Lena Park; Hareem; Henry	05:20
2.	"Untitled Love Song (Verona Piazza Bra Busking Ver.)" (제목 없는 Love Song)	Henry; Lena Park; Kim Feel; Hareem; Lim Heon-il	02:41
3.	"I LUV U (Amalfi Night Sea Busking Ver.)"	Henry; Lena Park; Hareem; Lim Heon-il	03:43
Total length:			11:44

Episode 12

No.	Title	Artist	Length
1.	"I Love You (Verona Piazza delle Erbe Busking Ver.)"	Henry; Kim Feel; Lee Su-hyun; Hareem; Lim Heon-il	03:57
Total length:			03:57

Episode 13

No.	Title	Artist	Length
1.	"Girls Like You (Sirmione Solo Busking Ver.)"	Henry	02:23
Total length:			02:23

Episode 14

No.	Title	Artist	Length
1.	"Chocolate Story (Cremona Cathedral Busking Ver.)" (초콜릿 이야기)	Hareem; Lena Park; Lee Su-hyun; Kim Feel; Henry; Lim Heon-il	03:10
Total length:			03:10

=== Season 4 (Begin Again Korea) ===
Season 4 (Begin Again Korea)

Episode 1

No.	Title	Artist	Length
1.	"Go Abroad (Incheon International Airport Ver.)" (출국(出國))	Hareem; Crush	03:54
2.	"Youngblood (Drive-in Busking Ver.)"	Henry	04:03
Total length:			07:57

Episode 3

No.	Title	Artist	Length
1.	"Can't Stop the Feeling! (Daegu Stadium Ver.)"	Henry	03:00
Total length:			03:00

Episode 5

No.	Title	Artist	Length
1.	"I Don't Want to Miss a Thing (Cinema Busking Ver.)"	Henry	02:50
Total length:			02:50

Episode 6

No.	Title	Artist	Length
1.	"Believer (Opening Ver.)"	Henry	03:22
2.	"I Will Always Love You (Pohang Busking Ver.)"	Sohyang	04:46
3.	"Miss Kim (Woryeonggyo Bridge Busking Ver.)" (미스 김)	Hareem; Jukjae	03:01
4.	"I Will Go to You Like the First Snow (Woryeonggyo Bridge Busking Ver.)" (첫눈처럼 너에게 가겠다)	Sohyang	03:33
Total length:			14:42

Episode 7

No.	Title	Artist	Length
1.	"My Heart Will Go On (Songdo Beach Busking Ver.)"	Sohyang; Jung Seung-hwan
2.	"Wind Song (Classic Collaboration Busking Ver.)" (바람의 노래)	Sohyang
3.	"I Won't Give Up (Songdo Beach Busking Ver.)"	Sohyang
4.	"I'll Be There (Songdo Beach Busking Ver.)"	Sohyang; Hareem
5.	"He's a Pirate (Classic Collaboration Busking Ver.)"	Henry; Hong Jin-ho; Lee Nau

Episode 8

No.	Title	Artist	Length
1.	"Please (Gyeonggijeon Busking Ver.)" (제발)	Sohyang
2.	"Back In Time (Parking Lot Busking Ver.)" (시간을 거슬러)	Sohyang

Episode 9

No.	Title	Artist	Length
1.	"Never Enough (Opening Ver.)"	Sohyang
2.	"Misty (Botanic Park Busking Ver.)"	Sohyang
3.	"Savage Love (Botanic Park Busking Ver.)"	Henry
4.	"Deep in the Night (Botanic Park Busking Ver.)" (밤이 깊었네)	Hareem

Episode 10

No.	Title	Artist	Length
1.	"End of a Day (Opening Ver.)" (하루의 끝)	Crush
2.	"Marvin Gaye (Camping Busking Ver.)"	Sohyang; Henry
3.	"You in My Arms (Marina Busking Ver.)" (그대 내 품에)	Crush
4.	"Faded (Marina Busking Ver.)"	Henry
5.	"If I Ain't Got You (Marina Busking Ver.)"	Sohyang

== Ratings ==
In the ratings below, the highest rating for the show will be in red, and the lowest rating for the show will be in blue each year.

- Note that the show airs on a cable channel (pay TV), which plays part in its slower uptake and relatively small audience share when compared to programs broadcast (FTA) on public networks such as KBS, SBS, MBC or EBS.
- NR rating means "not reported".
- TNmS have stopped publishing their rating reports from June 2018.

Season 1

Ep.	Original broadcast date	Average audience share		
Ep.	Original broadcast date	AGB Nielsen		TNmS
Ep.	Original broadcast date	Nationwide	Seoul	Nationwide
1	June 25, 2017	5.097%	6.492%	4.9%
2	July 2, 2017	4.378%	5.728%	3.9%
3	July 9, 2017	6.044%	7.422%	5.4%
4	July 16, 2017	5.115%	6.250%	4.4%
5	July 23, 2017	4.743%	5.653%	4.3%
6	July 30, 2017	4.763%	5.857%	4.3%
7	August 6, 2017	4.778%	6.046%	3.7%
8	August 13, 2017	4.944%	5.647%	5.1%
9	August 20, 2017	4.992%	6.051%	4.1%
10	August 27, 2017	4.369%	5.150%	3.4%
11	September 3, 2017	4.885%	6.064%	3.7%
12	September 10, 2017	4.541%	6.000%	4.0%

Season 2

Ep.	Original broadcast date	Average audience share		
Ep.	Original broadcast date	AGB Nielsen		TNmS
Ep.	Original broadcast date	Nationwide	Seoul	Nationwide
1	March 30, 2018	4.449%	4.750%	4.6%
2	April 6, 2018	4.348%	5.271%	4.0%
3	April 13, 2018	3.844%	4.189%	3.9%
4	April 20, 2018	3.564%	4.546%	4.0%
5	May 4, 2018	3.265%	3.873%	2.8%
6	May 11, 2018	3.849%	4.725%	3.3%
7	May 18, 2018	3.167%	3.158%	2.8%
8	May 25, 2018	4.171%	4.911%	4.4%
9	June 1, 2018	4.742%	5.776%	4.9%
10	June 8, 2018	5.063%	5.766%	NR
11	June 15, 2018	4.651%	5.214%	NR
12	June 22, 2018	4.021%	4.650%	NR
13	June 29, 2018	3.448%	3.742%	NR

Season 3

Ep.	Original broadcast date	Average audience share	
Ep.	Original broadcast date	AGB Nielsen	
Ep.	Original broadcast date	Nationwide	Seoul
1	July 19, 2019	4.577%	4.911%
2	July 26, 2019	4.106%	4.644%
3	August 2, 2019	4.436%	4.683%
4	August 9, 2019	5.093%	5.789%
5	August 16, 2019	4.801%	5.596%
6	August 23, 2019	4.736%	5.518%
7	August 30, 2019	4.419%	4.987%
8	September 6, 2019	4.338%	5.011%
9	September 20, 2019	3.379%	3.675%
10	September 27, 2019	3.864%	4.306%
11	October 4, 2019	4.277%	4.768%
12	October 11, 2019	4.763%	5.050%
13	October 18, 2019	4.779%	4.986%
14	October 25, 2019	4.839%	5.162%
15	November 1, 2019	3.915%	3.867%
16	November 8, 2019	3.600%	3.654%

Season 4 (Begin Again Korea)

Ep.	Original broadcast date	Average audience share	
Ep.	Original broadcast date	AGB Nielsen	
Ep.	Original broadcast date	Nationwide	Seoul
1	June 6, 2020	2.579%	3.208%
2	June 13, 2020	2.383%	3.004%
3	June 20, 2020	2.457%	3.449%
4	June 27, 2020	2.273%	2.744%
5	July 4, 2020	2.772%	3.609%
6	July 12, 2020	2.177%	2.889%
7	July 19, 2020	1.899%	—N/a
8	July 26, 2020	1.887%	—N/a
9	August 2, 2020	2.042%	—N/a
10	August 9, 2020	2.276%	2.905%

New Year's Special (Begin Again - Intermission)

Ep.	Original broadcast date	Average audience share	
Ep.	Original broadcast date	AGB Nielsen	
Ep.	Original broadcast date	Nationwide	Seoul
1	January 6, 2023	2.583%	3.044%
2	January 13, 2023	1.762%	NR
3	January 20, 2023	1.508%	NR
4	January 27, 2023	1.843%	NR
5	February 3, 2023	1.139%	NR
6	February 10, 2023	0.989%	NR
