= F(x) discography =

f(x) discography
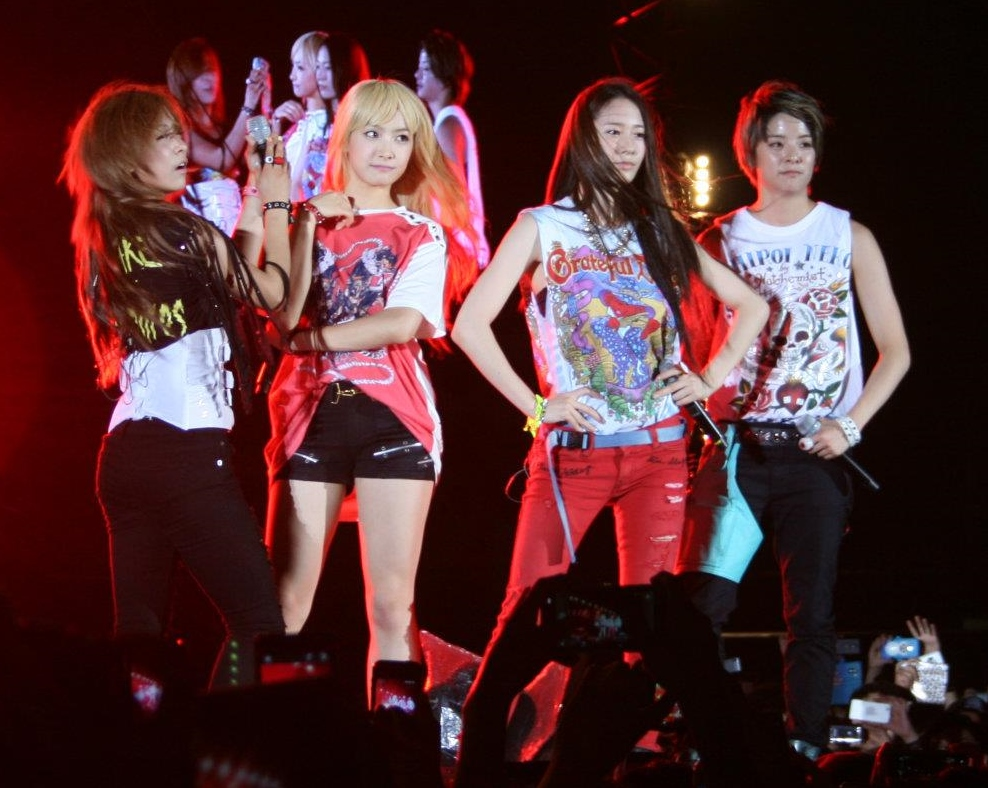
- f(x) performing in 2012
- Studio albums: 4
- Extended plays: 2
- Singles: 15
- Video albums: 1
- Music videos: 23
- Single albums: 2

The discography of the South Korean multinational girl group f(x) consists of four studio albums, two extended plays, one reissue album, one video album, fifteen singles, two promotional single and four soundtrack appearances.

f(x) formed by SM and debuted in September 2009 with the digital single "La Cha Ta" and two month later, they released their first physical single "Chu~♡". In 2010, their first EP Nu ABO was released. The single "Nu ABO" peaked number one on Gaon Chart. In 2011, the group released their first studio album Pinocchio, which was later re-released as Hot Summer in the same year. The album spawned two more singles: "Pinocchio (Danger)" and "Hot Summer" reached number one and two on Gaon Chart. The album was listed as one of the best-selling album of 2011 and also the single "Hot Summer" became one of the best-selling single of 2011. Their second EP Electric Shock (2012) and second studio album Pink Tape (2013) reached number one. The single "Electric Shock" from the second EP and "Rum Pum Pum Pum" from the second studio album all peaked atop South Korea's singles chart. Their album Pink Tape also garnered widespread critical acclaim with became the only K-pop album to be featured on US music channel Fuse's "41 Best Albums of 2013" and was named the "Greatest K-pop Album of the 2010s" by Billboard.

f(x) debuted in Japan with released the Japanese versions of their singles "Hot Summer". The single was re-released in their first Japanese single called "Summer Special: Pinocchio / Hot Summer in 2015. In 2016, their second Japanese single "4 Walls / Cowboy" was released.

== Albums ==
=== Studio albums ===
List of studio albums, with selected details and chart positions
Title	Details	Peak chart positions				Sales
Title	Details	KOR	JPN	US Heat	US World	Sales
Pinocchio	Released: April 20, 2011; Label: SM Entertainment; Formats: CD, digital download	1	—	—	—	KOR: 74,032; JPN: 8,004
Pink Tape	Released: July 29, 2013; Label: SM Entertainment; Formats: CD, digital download	1	28	21	1	KOR: 107,725; JPN: 11,022
Red Light	Released: July 7, 2014; Label: SM Entertainment; Formats: CD, digital download	1	29	13	2	KOR: 97,126; JPN: 7,430
4 Walls	Released: October 27, 2015; Label: SM Entertainment; Formats: CD, digital download	1	39	7	1	KOR: 82,181; JPN: 3,700; US: 1,000
"—" denotes releases that did not chart or were not released in that region.

=== Reissues ===
List of reissues, with selected details, chart positions, and sales
Title	Details	Peak chart positions	Sales
Title	Details	KOR	Sales
Hot Summer	Released: June 14, 2011; Label: SM Entertainment; Formats: CD, digital download	2	KOR: 70,240; JPN: 9,268

=== Video albums ===
Title	Details	Peak chart positions	Sales
Title	Details	JPN DVD	Sales
f(x) Dimension 4 – Docking Station in Japan	Released: July 6, 2016; Language: Korean, Japanese; DVD Region: 1	4 (DVD); 3 (Blu-ray)	JPN: 5,880

== Extended plays ==
List of extended plays, with selected chart positions and sales
Title	Details	Peak chart positions				Sales
Title	Details	KOR	JPN	US Heat	US World	Sales
Nu ABO	Released: May 4, 2010; Label: SM Entertainment; Formats: CD, digital download	2	—	—	—	KOR: 54,243
Electric Shock	Released: June 10, 2012; Label: SM Entertainment; Formats: CD, digital download	1	16	21	2	KOR: 91,119; JPN: 15,243
"—" denotes releases that did not chart or were not released in that region.

== Singles ==
=== Korean singles ===
List of Korean singles, with selected chart positions and sales, showing year released and album name
Title	Year	Peak chart positions			Sales	Album
Title	Year	KOR	KOR Hot	US World	Sales	Album
"La Cha Ta"	2009	(Note: The Gaon Chart was established in February 2010.)	(Note: The Korea K-Pop Hot 100 chart was launched in 2011 by Billboard and was discontinued in 2014.)	—		Non-album single
"Chu~♡"	2009	(Note: The Gaon Chart was established in February 2010.)	(Note: The Korea K-Pop Hot 100 chart was launched in 2011 by Billboard and was discontinued in 2014.)	—	KOR: 4,485 (phy.)	Chu~♡
"Nu ABO" (NU 예삐오)	2010	1	(Note: The Korea K-Pop Hot 100 chart was launched in 2011 by Billboard and was discontinued in 2014.)	—	KOR: 2,213,236; US: 25,000	Nu ABO
"Pinocchio (Danger)" (피노키오)	2011	1	69	7	KOR: 2,619,155; US: 15,000	Pinocchio
"Hot Summer"	2011	2	30	—	KOR: 3,096,252; US: 17,000	Hot Summer
"Electric Shock"	2012	1	2	3	KOR: 2,165,544; US: 35,000	Electric Shock
"Rum Pum Pum Pum" (첫 사랑니)	2013	1	1	5	KOR: 941,078; US: 13,000	Pink Tape
"Red Light"	2014	2	3	3	KOR: 554,065	Red Light
"4 Walls"	2015	2		2	KOR: 753,516	4 Walls
"Wish List" (12시 25분)	2015	21		—	KOR: 91,411	Winter Garden
"All Mine"	2016	12		2	KOR: 241,579	SM Station Season 1
"—" denotes releases that did not chart or were not released in that region.

=== Japanese singles ===
List of Japanese singles, with selected chart positions and sales, showing year released and album name
Title	Year	Peak chart positions		Sales	Album
Title	Year	JPN	JPN Hot	Sales	Album
"Summer Special: Pinocchio / Hot Summer"	2015	23	57		Non-album singles
"4 Walls / Cowboy"	2016	15	—	JPN: 8,677	Non-album singles
"—" denotes releases that did not chart or were not released in that region.

=== Promotional singles ===
Title	Year	Peak chart positions	Album
Title	Year	KOR Gaon	Album
"Chocolate Love (Electronic Pop Ver.)"	2009	7	Non-album singles
"Lollipop" (feat. M.I.C.)	2010	—	Non-album singles
"—" denotes releases that did not chart or were not released in that region.

== Other charted songs ==
Title	Year	Peak chart positions		Sales	Album
Title	Year	KOR Gaon	KOR Hot.	Sales	Album
"Thrill Love"	2010	16			OST for the drama of Hungry Romeo, Luxury Juliet
"I Love You, I Love You" (사랑해, 사랑해)	2010	36			More Charming by the Day: Original Sound Track
"Ice Cream" (아이스크림)	2010	71			Nu ABO
"Sorry (Dear. Daddy)"	2010	77			Nu ABO
"Surprise Party"	2010	84			Nu ABO
"Me+U"	2010	88			Nu ABO
"Is It OK?" (좋아해도 되나요)	2011	108		KOR: 23,232	Paradise Ranch OST / Hot Summer (Repackage Edition)
"Sweet Witches" (빙그르)	2011	77		KOR: 142,870	Pinocchio / Hot Summer (Repackage Edition)
"Dangerous"	2011	64		KOR: 191,981	Pinocchio / Hot Summer (Repackage Edition)
"Beautiful Goodbye"	2011	79		KOR: 124,367	Pinocchio / Hot Summer (Repackage Edition)
"Gangsta Boy"	2011	74		KOR: 131,412	Pinocchio / Hot Summer (Repackage Edition)
"Love" (아이)	2011	66		KOR: 212,559	Pinocchio / Hot Summer (Repackage Edition)
"Stand Up!"	2011	100		KOR: 90,311	Pinocchio / Hot Summer (Repackage Edition)
"My Style"	2011	98		KOR: 107,336	Pinocchio / Hot Summer (Repackage Edition)
"So Into U"	2011	101		KOR: 83,086	Pinocchio / Hot Summer (Repackage Edition)
"Lollipop" (featuring Shinee)	2011	29		KOR: 581,897	Pinocchio / Hot Summer (Repackage Edition)
"Jet" (제트별)	2012	24	39	KOR: 383,890	Electric Shock
"Zig Zag" (지그재그)	2012	40	52	KOR: 149,141	Electric Shock
"Beautiful Stranger"	2012	29	42	KOR: 205,989	Electric Shock
"Love Hate"	2012	44	63	KOR: 137,738	Electric Shock
"Let's Try" (훌쩍)	2012	47	71	KOR: 125,645	Electric Shock
"Shadow" (미행 (그림자))	2013	3	25	KOR: 235,165	Pink Tape
"Pretty Girl"	2013	30	58	KOR: 52,460	Pink Tape
"Kick"	2013	42	85	KOR: 44,095	Pink Tape
"Signal" (시그널)	2013	22	57	KOR: 66,936	Pink Tape
"Step"	2013	25	86	KOR: 61,532	Pink Tape
"Goodbye Summer" (featuring D.O.)	2013	5	26	KOR: 292,583	Pink Tape
"Airplane"	2013	16	47	KOR: 105,958	Pink Tape
"Toy"	2013	35	75	KOR: 47,416	Pink Tape
"No More" (여우 같은 내 친구)	2013	28	61	KOR: 53,052	Pink Tape
"Snapshot"	2013	34	63	KOR: 47,487	Pink Tape
"Ending Page"	2013	40	93	KOR: 45,537	Pink Tape
"Milk"	2014	10	28	KOR: 197,839	Red Light
"Butterfly" (나비)	2014	33	76	KOR: 61,576	Red Light
"Rainbow" (무지개)	2014	50	—	KOR: 48,656	Red Light
"All Night"	2014	16	37	KOR: 163,539	Red Light
"Vacance" (바캉스)	2014	49	97	KOR: 49,269	Red Light
"Spit It Out" (뱉어내)	2014	56	—	KOR: 46,736	Red Light
"Boom Bang Boom"	2014	51	—	KOR: 49,031	Red Light
"Dracula"	2014	39	82	KOR: 55,912	Red Light
"Summer Lover"	2014	45	95	KOR: 52,466	Red Light
"Paper Heart" (종이 심장)	2014	36	89	KOR: 60,506	Red Light
"Traveler" (featuring Zico)	2015	24		KOR: 58,057	4 Walls
"Diamond"	2015	29		KOR: 57,630	4 Walls
"Glitter"	2015	35		KOR: 52,369	4 Walls
"X"	2015	38		KOR: 46,861	4 Walls
"Deja Vu"	2015	39		KOR: 47,210	4 Walls
"Rude Love"	2015	46		KOR: 43,466	4 Walls
"Papi"	2015	47		KOR: 43,863	4 Walls
"When I'm Alone"	2015	51		KOR: 41,942	4 Walls
"Cash Me Out"	2015	52		KOR: 41,700	4 Walls
"—" denotes releases that did not chart or were not released in that region.

== Music videos ==
=== Korean music videos ===
List of Korean music videos
Year	Music video	Director(s)	Note
2009	"La Cha Ta"	Unknown	Debut music video
2009	"Chocolate Love" (electro-pop version)	Unknown	Commercial film for LG's Chocolate (2 versions)
2009	"Chu~♡"	Unknown	
2009	"Hard but Easy"	Unknown	OST for Invincible Lee Pyung Kang (Luna and Krystal duet)
2010	"Thrill Love"	Unknown	OST for Hungry Romeo, Luxury Juliet
2010	"Nu ABO"	Unknown	
2011	"Pinocchio (Danger)"	Zanybros	
2011	"Hot Summer"	Zanybros	
2012	"Electric Shock"	Zanybros	Most viewed f(x) music video on YouTube
2013	"Rum Pum Pum Pum"	Zanybros	
2014	"Red Light"	Min Hee-jin	Last music video as a 5-member group
2015	"4 Walls"	Shin Hee-won	First music video as a 4-member group
2015	"12:25 (Wish List)"	Unknown	Story music video
2016	"All Mine"	Amber	Directed by Amber

=== Japanese music videos ===
List of Japanese music videos
Year	Music video	Director(s)	Note
2012	"Hot Summer"	Unknown	Japanese debut PV
2015	"Pinocchio (Danger)"	Unknown	Filmed in 2011 (at the same time as the Korean version)
2016	"4 Walls"	Unknown	Filmed in 2015 (at the same time as the Korean version)

=== Chinese music videos ===
List of Chinese music videos
Year	Music video	Director(s)	Note
2010	"Lollipop"	Unknown	Commercial film for LG's Lollipop (with M.I.C.)

== See also ==
- List of songs recorded by f(x)

== Notes ==
Awards and achievements
Preceded by Girls' Generation	Korean Music Awards: Group Musician of the Year; 2011	Succeeded by Infinite
Preceded by DJ Doc	26th Golden Disk Awards: Disk Bonsang; 2011	Succeeded by Incumbent
