= List of songs recorded by f(x) =

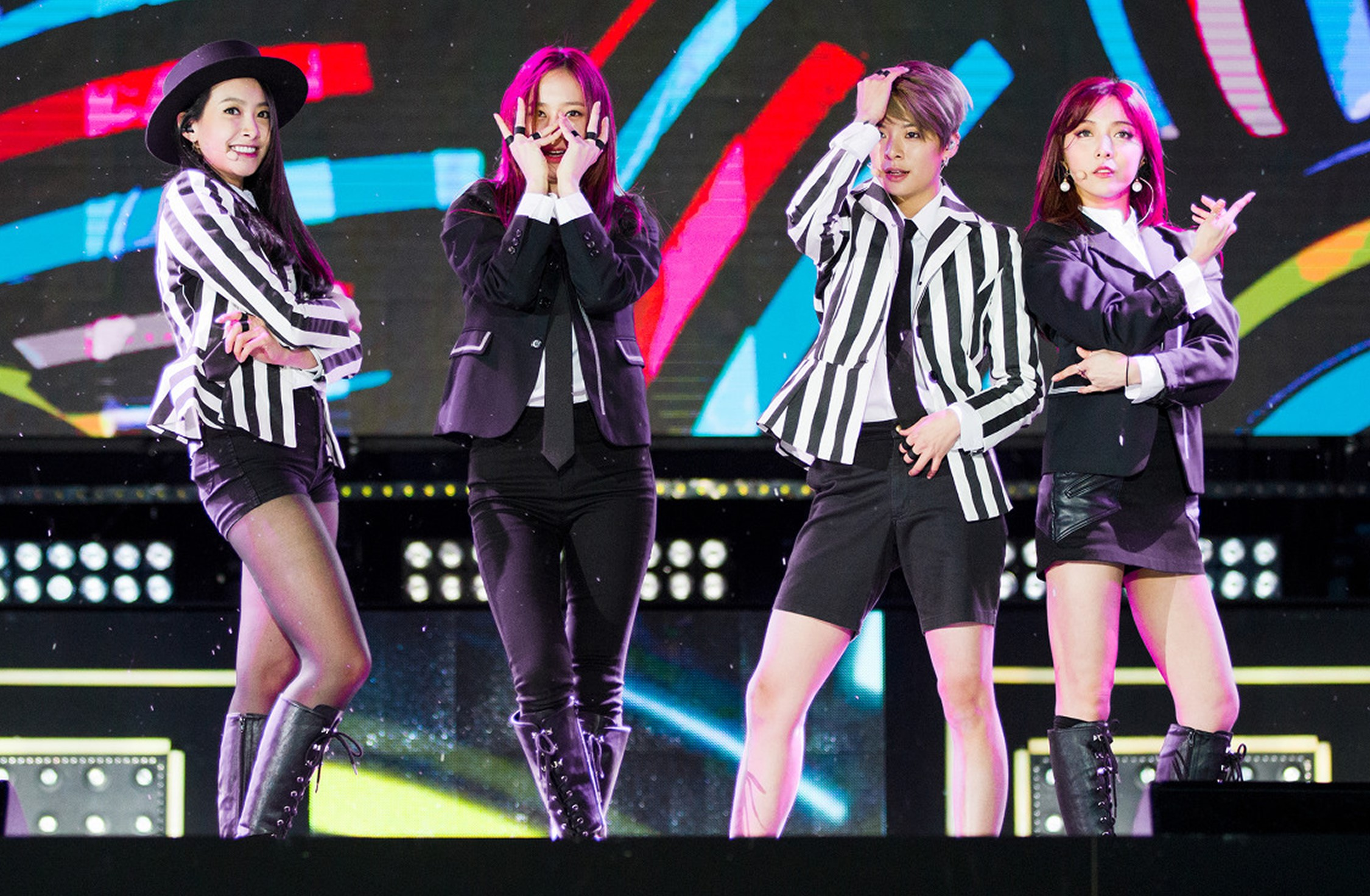
f(x) at Jeju K-pop Festival, in October 2015 From left to right: Victoria, Krystal, Amber, Luna

f(x) is a South Korean girl group formed by SM Entertainment in 2009. Their debut "LA chA TA" was released on September 1. They also released their first physical single, "Chu~♡", on November 9.

On May 14, 2010, the group released their first EP, NU ABO with the title track as the lead single. They promoted the single "Mr Boogie" as a follow-up single from their EP.

They released their first full-length studio album Pinocchio in April 2011 with the title track as the lead single. In June 2011 Pinocchio was re-released under the title "Hot Summer" with three previously released digital singles and the title track as the lead single.

The group released their second EP Electric Shock on June 10, 2012. On July 29, 2013, the group released their second full-length studio album Pink Tape with the lead single "Rum Pum Pum Pum".

The group released their third full-length studio album Red Light, on July 7, 2014. In August 2015, it was announced that Sulli had officially left the group to focus on acting. The remaining four members continued as a group, releasing their fourth studio album, 4 Walls, on October 27, 2015.

Key
| Indicates Single Release | Indicates Promotional Single Release |

== 0-9 ==
| Song | Member(s) | Album / EP / Single | Year | Other performer(s) | Note |
|---|---|---|---|---|---|
| "1, 2, 3" | All | 2011 Winter SMTown – The Warmest Gift | 2011 | | English |
| "12시 25분 (Wish List)" | All | Winter Garden | 2015 | | SMTown's winter special project |
| "1-4-3 (I Love You)" | Amber | Trap | 2013 | Henry | Henry feat. Amber |
| "4 Walls" | All | 4 Walls | 2015 | | Title Track |
| "4 Walls" (Japanese Version) | All | 4 Walls / Cowboy | 2016 | | Japanese Version |

== A ==
| Song | Member(s) | Album / EP / Single | Year | Other performer(s) | Note |
|---|---|---|---|---|---|
| "너를 사랑하고 (And I Love You)" | Luna | The President OST | 2010 | Yesung | OST for the Drama "The President" |
| "Airplane" | All | Pink Tape | 2013 | | |
| "All Mine" | All | Non-Album Release | 2016 | | Part of SM Station project |
| "All Night" | All | Red Light | 2014 | | |
| "All of a Sudden" | Krystal | My Lovely Girl Ost Part 2 | 2014 | | OST for the Drama "My Lovely Girl" |

== B ==
| Song | Member(s) | Album / EP /Single | Year | Other performer(s) | Note |
|---|---|---|---|---|---|
| "Beautiful" | Amber | Beautiful | 2015 | | Pre-released on February 9, 2015 |
| "아름다운 날 (Beautiful Day)" | Luna | Please Marry Me OST | 2010 | | OST for the Drama "Please Marry Me" |
| "Beautiful Goodbye" | All | Pinocchio / Hot Summer (Repackage Edition) | 2011 | | |
| "Beautiful Stranger" | Amber, Luna, Krystal | Electric Shock | 2012 | | |
| "나 때문에 (Because of Me)" | Krystal | Sign OST | 2011 | | OST for the Drama "Sign" |
| "Boom Bang Boom" | All | Red Light | 2014 | | |
| "Borders" | Amber | Crossing | 2016 | | Part of SM Station and first single of the Crossing series |
| "Breathe" | Luna | Free Somebody | 2016 | | |
| "Breathe Again" | Amber | Breathe Again | 2016 | featuring Ksuke | |
| "Breath" (Japanese Version) | Krystal | SM the Ballad Vol. 2 - Breath | 2014 | Changmin | SM the Ballad |
| "나비 (Butterfly)" | All | Red Light | 2014 | | |
| "Butterfly" | Krystal | To the Beautiful You OST | 2012 | Jessica | OST for the Drama "To the Beautiful You" |
| "Byeolkoliya(별꼴이야)" | All | 5 Men's 5th Story (EP) | 2010 | Tin Tin Five | Tin Tin Five feat. f(x) |

== C ==
| Song | Member(s) | Album / EP/ Single | Year | Other performer(s) | Note |
|---|---|---|---|---|---|
| "불러본다 (Calling Out)" | Luna, Krystal | Cinderella's Sister OST | 2010 | | OST for the Drama "Cinderella's Sister" |
| "Cash Me Out" | All | 4 Walls | 2015 | | |
| "Child (Love)" "(아이 (Ai))" | All | Pinocchio / Hot Summer (Repackage Edition) | 2011 | | |
| "Chocolate Love" (Electronic Pop Version) | All | Non-Album Released | 2009 | | Girls' Generation (Retro Pop Version) |
| "Cowboy" | All | 4 Walls / Cowboy | 2016 | | Japanese |
| "Chu~♡" | All | Chu~♡; Hot Summer (Repackage Edition) | 2009 | | Title Track for f(x) First Physical Single |

== D ==
| Song | Member(s) | Album / EP /Single | Year | Other performer(s) | Note |
|---|---|---|---|---|---|
| "Dangerous" | All | Pinocchio / Hot Summer (Repackage Edition) | 2011 | | |
| "Dear Child" | Victoria | Beautiful Secret OST | 2015 | | Chinese |
| "Deja Vu" | All | 4 Walls | 2015 | | |
| "Diamond" | All | 4 Walls | 2015 | | |
| "미소를 띄우며 나를 보낸 그 모습처럼 (Don't Cry For Me)"(Lee Eun-ha cover) | Luna | King of Masked Singer special single | 2015 | | |
| "Dracula" | All | Red Light | 2014 | | |
| "Dream Drive" | Luna | Dream Drive | 2014 | Play the Siren | Play the Siren (feat. Luna) |

== E ==
| Song | Member(s) | Album / EP / Single | Year | Other performer(s) | Note |
|---|---|---|---|---|---|
| "Electric Shock" | All | Electric Shock | 2012 | | Title Track |
| "Ending Page" | All | Pink Tape | 2013 | | |

== F ==
| Song | Member(s) | Album / EP / Single | Year | Other performer(s) | Note |
|---|---|---|---|---|---|
| "Free Somebody" | Luna | Free Somebody (EP) | 2016 | | Lead single for Luna's solo debut |

== G ==
| Song | Member(s) | Album / EP / Single | Year | Other performer(s) | Note |
|---|---|---|---|---|---|
| "Galaxy" | Luna | Free Somebody (EP) | 2016 | | |
| "Gangsta Boy" | All | Pinocchio / Hot Summer (Repackage Edition) | 2011 | | |
| "깔라까바나 (Garagabana)" | All | Non-Album Release | 2011 | | OST for Online Game "Puzzle Bubble" |
| "Get Down" | Luna | 2009, Year of Us | 2009 | SHINee | SHINee feat. Luna |
| "Glitter" | All | 4 Walls | 2015 | | |
| "Goodbye Summer" | Amber, Luna, Krystal | Pink Tape | 2013 | D.O. | f(Amber+Luna+Krystal) feat D.O. of EXO |
| "투정 (Grumbling)" | Krystal | Non-Album Release | 2011 | Leeteuk | OST for the MBC's "Sunday Night - Enjoy Today" |

== H ==
| Song | Member(s) | Album / EP / Single | Year | Other performer(s) | Note |
|---|---|---|---|---|---|
| "Happy Holidays" | Amber | Non-Album Release | 2011 | Henry | |
| "Hard but Easy" (어렵고도 쉬운 (Eoryeopgodo Swiun)) | Luna, Krystal | Invincible Lee Pyung Kang OST Part 3 | 2009 | | OST for the Drama "Invincible Lee Pyung Kang" |
| "Healing Love" | Luna | Kill Me, Heal Me OST | 2015 | | OST for the Drma "Kill Me, Heal Me" |
| "Heights" | Amber | Beautiful | 2015 | | |
| "Honey Bee" | Luna | Honey Bee | 2017 | Hani and Solar | |
| "Hot Summer" | All | Hot Summer (Repackage Edition) | 2011 | | |
| "Hot Summer" (Japanese Ver.) | All | SUMMER SPECIAL Pinocchio / Hot Summer | 2015 | | f(x)'s Japanese Debut Song |

== I ==
| Song | Member(s) | Album / EP / Single | Year | Other performer(s) | Note |
|---|---|---|---|---|---|
| "I Believe" | Victoria | My New Sassy Girl OST | 2016 | | 2016 Chinese version (Girl) |
| "I Don't Wanna Love You" | Krystal | I Don't Wanna Love You | 2017 | Glen Check's June One Kim | |
| "I Just Wanna" (featuring Eric Nam) | Amber | Beautiful | 2015 | Eric Nam | Amber feat. Eric Nam English Version of the song "Goodbye Summer" |
| "사랑해, 사랑해 (I Love You, I Love You)" | All | Non-Album Release | 2010 | | OST for the Drama "More Charming by the Day" |
| "I'm Back" | Amber | The First Second | 2010 | Danson Tang | Danson Tang rap feat. Amber |
| "I Wish" | Luna | Free Somebody (EP) | 2016 | | |
| "Ice Cream (아이스크림)" | All | Nu ABO | 2010 | | |
| "Ice Cream (Remix)" | All; Remix by Idiotape | S.M. + 10 Corso Como Seoul Collaboration Project | 2013 | | |
| "나야 (It's Me)" | Luna | To the Beautiful You OST | 2012 | Sunny | OST for the Drama "To the Beautiful You" |
| "괜찮아 (It's Okay)" | Luna | Cheongdam-dong Alice OST | 2012 | | OST for the Drama "Cheongdam-dong Alice" |
| "It's You" | Luna | It's You | 2016 | 4Men's Shin Yong-jae | |
| "It Was Love" | Luna | Break Up 2 Make Up | 2016 | Zico | Zico feat. Luna |

== J ==
| Song | Member(s) | Album / EP / Single | Year | Other performer(s) | Note |
|---|---|---|---|---|---|
| "Jet" (제트별) | All | Electric Shock | 2012 | | |
| "Jiu Long Jue" | Victoria | Zhe Tian 3D Mobile Game Theme Song | 2016 | | Chinese |

== K ==
| Song | Member(s) | Album / EP / Single | Year | Other performer(s) | Note |
|---|---|---|---|---|---|
| "Keep On Doin" | Luna | Free Somebody (EP) | 2016 | | |
| "Kick" | All | Pink Tape | 2013 | | |

== L ==
| Song | Member(s) | Album | Year | Other performer(s) | Note |
|---|---|---|---|---|---|
| "La Cha Ta" (stylized as "LA chA TA") | All | Hot Summer (Repackage Edition) | 2009(Digital); 2011(Physical) | | f(x)'s Debut song |
| "Letting go" | Amber | Vivid | 2015 | Ailee | Ailee ft Amber |
| "Let's Go" | Luna | Non-Album Released | 2010 | Changmin, Gayoon, Kahi, Junhyung, Junsu(2PM), Seohyun, Gyuri, G.O, Min, Jaekyung, JiEun, Jonghyun, Sungmin, G.NA, Seo In Guk, Son Dambi, IU, Bumkey, and Anna. | For G20 Seoul Summit |
| "Let's Try (훌쩍)" | All | Electric Shock | 2012 | | |
| "Li Luo" | Victoria | Ice Fantasy OST | 2016 | | Chinese |
| "Lollipop" (feat. M.I.C.) | All | Non-Album Release | 2010 | M.I.C. | Chinese Version |
| "Lollipop" (feat. SHINee) | All | Hot Summer (Repackage Edition) | 2011 | Shinee | Korean Version |
| "Love Don't Hurt" | Amber | Non-Album Release | 2017 | Shannon | Shannon ft Amber; English Version |
| "Love Hate" | All | Electric Shock | 2012 | | |
| "Love Run" | Amber | Beautiful | 2015 | | |
| "Loving You" | Victoria | Rewind | 2014 | Zhou Mi | Zhou Mi feat Victoria |
| "Lower" | Amber, Luna | SM Station Season 2 | 2018 | | |

== M ==
| Song | Member(s) | Album / EP / Single | Year | Other performer(s) | Note |
|---|---|---|---|---|---|
| "ME+U" | All | Nu ABO | 2010 | | |
| "Melody (Moderato)" | Krystal | Melody Project part II Moderato | 2010 | | |
| "MILK" | All | Red Light | 2014 | | |
| "Mr. Boogie" | All | Nu ABO | 2010 | | |
| "My Medicine" | Luna | Free Somebody (EP) | 2016 | | |
| "My Style" | All | Pinocchio / Hot Summer (Repackage Edition) | 2011 | | |

== N ==
| Song | Member(s) | Album | Year | Other performer(s) | Note |
|---|---|---|---|---|---|
| "Need to feel Needed" | Amber | Crossing | 2016 | | Third single of the Crossing series |
| "NU 예삐오 (Nu ABO)" | All | Nu ABO | 2010 | | Title Track |
| "여우 같은 내 친구 (No More)" | All | Pink Tape | 2013 | | |

== O ==
| Song | Member(s) | Album / EP / Single | Year | Other performer(s) | Note |
|---|---|---|---|---|---|
| "Oops!" | All | Mr. Simple / A-Cha | 2011 | Super Junior | Super Junior feat. f(x) |
| "그대만 살아서 (Only You)" | Luna | The Merchant: Gaekju 2015 OST | 2015 | | |
| "On My Own" | Amber | Crossing | 2016 | Gen Neo | Amber feat Gen Neo Second single of the Crossing series |

== P ==
| Song | Member(s) | Album / EP / Single | Year | Other performer(s) | Note |
|---|---|---|---|---|---|
| "종이 심장 (Paper Heart)" | All | Red Light | 2014 | | |
| "Papi" | All | 4 Walls | 2015 | | |
| "Pinocchio (Danger)" (피노키오) (Pinokio) | All | Pinocchio / Hot Summer (Repackage Edition) | 2011 | | Title Track |
| "Pinocchio (Danger)" (Japanese version) | All | SUMMER SPECIAL Pinocchio / Hot Summer | 2015 | | |
| "Pretty Girl' | All | Pink Tape | 2013 | | |

== R ==
| Song | Member(s) | Album / EP / Single | Year | Other performer(s) | Note |
|---|---|---|---|---|---|
| "무지개 (Rainbow)" | All | Red Light | 2014 | | |
| "Red Light" | All | Red Light | 2014 | | Title Track |
| "Roof on Fire" (屋顶着火 (wū dǐng zhuó huǒ)) | Victoria | Victoria | 2018 | | Chinese; Pre-Release for her debut album Victoria |
| "Round and Round (Sweet Witches)" (빙그르 (Binggeureu)) | All | Pinocchio / Hot Summer (Repackage Edition) | 2011 | | |
| "Rude Love" | All | 4 Walls | 2015 | | |
| "Rum Pum Pum Pum" (첫 사랑니 (cheot sarang)) | All | Pink Tape | 2013 | | Lead Single |

== S ==
| Song | Member(s) | Album / EP / Single | Year | Other performer(s) | Note |
|---|---|---|---|---|---|
| "Say Yes" | Krystal | Make Your Move OST | 2014 | Jessica & Kris | OST for the Movie "Make Your Move" |
| "미행 (그림자; Shadow)" | All | Pink Tape | 2013 | | |
| "Shake That Brass" (featuring Taeyeon of Girls' Generation) | Amber | Beautiful | 2015 | Taeyeon | Lead Single for Amber's Solo Debut |
| "Shine Your Way" | Luna | The Croods OST | 2013 | Kyuhyun | OST for the Drama "The Croods" |
| "시그널 (Signal)" | All | Pink Tape | 2013 | | |
| "Snapshot" | All | Pink Tape | 2013 | | |
| "So into U" | All | Pinocchio / Hot Summer (Repackage Edition) | 2011 | | |
| "Sorry (Dear.Daddy)" | Luna, Krystal | Nu ABO | 2010 | | |
| "Sound of Your Heart" | Luna | SM Station | 2016 | Lee Dong-woo, Yesung, Sunny, Seulgi, Wendy, Taeil and Doyoung | |
| "뱉어내 (Spit it Out)" | All | Red Light | 2014 | | |
| "날개를 펴고 (Spread Its Wings)" | Luna, Krystal, Amber | God of Study OST Part 2 | 2010 | | OST for "God of Study" |
| "Stand Up!" | All | Pinocchio / Hot Summer (Repackage Edition) | 2011 | | |
| "Star Tears" | Victoria | Beautiful Secret OST | 2015 | | Chinese |
| "Start Of Something New" Korean Ver. | Luna | High School Musical on Stage! Korean cast recording | 2013 | Ryeowook | OST for the Korean Version of "High School Musical |
| "Step" | All | Pink Tape | 2013 | | |
| "Step by Me" | All | Chu~♡ | 2009 | | |
| "Summer Lover" | All | Red Light | 2014 | | |
| "Surprise Party" | All | Nu ABO | 2010 | | |

== T ==
| Song | Member(s) | Album / EP / Single | Year | Other performer(s) | Note |
|---|---|---|---|---|---|
| "Tao Hua Yuan" | Victoria | Tao Hua Yuan Ji 2 Online Game Theme Song | 2016 | | Chinese |
| "스릴 러브 (Thrill Love)" | All | Non-Album Release | 2011 | | OST for "Hungry Romeo, Luxury Juliet" |
| "사실말이야 (쉿!) (The Truth is (Shh!))" | All | Non-Album Release | 2010 | | Opening OST for ""Juloring Animal Detectives" |
| "Traveler" | All | 4 Walls | 2015 | Zico | f(x) feat. Zico |
| "Toy" | All | Pink Tape | 2013 | | |
| "Tell Me It's Okay" | Luna | Tell Me It's Okay | 2017 | Jun-hyung | |
| "Ten Years" | Luna | Ride Me | 2014 | Donghae & Eunhyuk | Donghae & Eunhyuk feat. Luna |

== U ==
| Song | Member(s) | Album / EP / Single | Year | Other performer(s) | Note |
|---|---|---|---|---|---|
| "U+Me" | Luna | TalesWeaver OST | 2013 | | OST for "TalesWeaver" |

== V ==
| Song | Member(s) | Album /EP / Single | Year | Other performer(s) | Note |
|---|---|---|---|---|---|
| "바캉스 (Vacance)" | All | Red Light | 2014 | | |

== W ==
| Song | Member(s) | Album / EP / Single | Year | Other performer(s) | Note |
|---|---|---|---|---|---|
| "Wave" | Amber, Luna | Non-Album Release | 2016 | R3hab & XaviGi | Part of SM Station project. First single for SM's EDM label ScreaM Records |
| "When I'm Alone" | All | 4 Walls | 2015 | | |
| "좋았던 건, 아팠던 건 (When I Was... When U Were...)" | Krystal | SM the Ballad Vol. 2 - Breath | 2014 | Chen | SM the Ballad |

== X ==
| Song | Member(s) | Album / EP / Single | Year | Other performer(s) | Note |
|---|---|---|---|---|---|
| "X" | All | 4 Walls | 2015 | | |

== Y ==
| Song | Member(s) | Album / EP / Single | Year | Other performer(s) | Note |
|---|---|---|---|---|---|
| "You Are Hiding A Secret (...Is It OK?)" (좋아해도 되나요 (Jo-ahaedo Doenayo)) | All | Journey / Is It Ok?; Hot Summer (Repackage Edition) | 2011 | | |
| "You Are My Destiny" | Luna, Krystal | Chu~♡ | 2009 | | |

== Z ==
| Song | Member(s) | Album / EP / Single | Year | Other performer(s) | Note |
|---|---|---|---|---|---|
| "Zig Zag" (지그재그 (Jigeujaegeu)) | All | Electric Shock | 2012 | | |
