= Dimension 4 – Docking Station =

2016 concert tour by f(x)

- Asia tour by f(x)
- Promotional poster for f(x)'s "DIMENSION 4 – Docking Station" concert.
- Location: South Korea; Japan
- Associated album: 4 Walls
- Start date: January 29, 2016
- End date: November 3, 2016
- No. of shows: 3 in South Korea; 8 in Japan; 11 total

Dimension 4 – Docking Station was the debut concert tour of South Korean girl group f(x) launched in support of their fourth studio album, 4 Walls. It consisted of three shows in Seoul, South Korea, and eight shows throughout Japan. The tour commenced at the Olympic Hall in Seoul, and concluded at the Yokohama Arena in Yokohama, Japan. A concert DVD, f(x) Dimension 4 – Docking Station in Japan, was released on July 6, 2016, in Japan.

== Overview ==
The tour was announced by SM Entertainment on October 28, 2015, more than 6 years after f(x)'s official debut in September 2009. On December 3, 2015, SM Entertainment revealed promotional posters for the tour, and that tickets would be going on sale on December 10.

The first three concerts took place at the Seoul Olympic Park Olympic Hall, on January 29, 30 and 31. The group also performed in four cities in Japan throughout February. On holding their first solo tour, the group stated the following:

This is the first time we are having our own stage. We are very excited and nervous, as this is the first stage that we’re meeting our fans exclusively, and we have a lot of performances that we have yet to show you.

The tour consisted of three concerts in South Korea and six concerts in Japan, and was directed by dance choreographer Shim Jae-won. Two encore concerts were held on November 2 and 3, 2016, in Yokohama, Japan.

A total of 43,500 people attended the Japanese leg of the tour, including 16,000 people in Tokyo and 18,000 people in Yokohama. A concert in Bangkok, Thailand, originally scheduled for November 20, was canceled.

== Set list ==
South Korea (January 29–31, 2016)

Main Set
Act 1 - "Docking Station" VCR

1. "Electric Shock"
2. "Red Light" (rock version)
3. "Dangerous"
4. "Dracula"

Act 2 - Ment

5. "Gangsta Boy" / "Toy"
6. "La chA TA"
7. "Me+U"
8. "Pinocchio (Danger)"
9. "Beautiful Goodbye"
10. "Sorry (Dear Daddy)" (Luna, Krystal)

Act 3 - "Fantasy of Girls" VCR (BGM: Signal)

11. "Shadow" / "Sweet Witches" / "Milk"
12. "Ice Cream"
13. "Nu ABO"
14. "Traveler" / "Zig Zag"
15. "Airplane"
16. "Jet"
17. "Beautiful Stranger" (Amber, Luna & Krystal)

Act 4 - "A Day of KLAV" VCR (BGM: Boom Bang Boom)

18. "Rainbow"
19. "Pretty Girl"
20. "Diamond" (Boom Bang Boom remix)
21. "Rum Pum Pum Pum"
22. "Step" (with "Shake That Brass" interlude)

Act 5 - "Optical Illusion" VCR (BGM: Love)

23. "4 Walls"
24. "Papi"
25. "Deja Vu"
26. "Rude Love"
27. "Cash Me Out"

Encore

28. "So Into U"
29. "All Night"
30. "Ending Page"
31. "Surprise Party" (31st only - sung in celebration of Victoria's upcoming birthday)
Japan (February 20–28, 2016)

Main Set
Act 1

1. "Electric Shock"
2. "Red Light" (rock version)
3. "Dangerous"
4. "Dracula"

Act 2

5. "Gangsta Boy" / "Toy"
6. "La chA TA"
7. "Me+U"
8. "Pinocchio (Danger)"
9. "Beautiful Goodbye"
10. "Sorry (Dear Daddy)" (Luna, Krystal)

Act 3

11. "Shadow" / "Sweet Witches" / "Milk"
12. "Ice Cream"
13. "Nu ABO"
14. "Traveler" / "Zig Zag"
15. "Airplane"
16. "Jet"
17. "Beautiful Stranger" (Amber, Luna & Krystal)

Act 4

18. "Rainbow"
19. "Pretty Girl"
20. "Diamond" (Boom Bang Boom remix)
21. "Rum Pum Pum Pum"
22. "Step" (with "Shake That Brass" interlude)

Act 5

23. "4 Walls" (Japanese version)
24. "Papi"
25. "Deja Vu"
26. "Rude Love"
27. "Cash Me Out"

Encore

28. "So Into U"
29. "Hot Summer" (Japanese version)
30. "Ending Page"
Japan (November 2–3, 2016) Encore

Main Set
Act 1

1. "Electric Shock"
2. "Red Light" (rock version)
3. "Dangerous"
4. "Dracula"

Act 2

5. "Gangsta Boy" / "Toy"
6. "La chA TA"
7. "Me+U"
8. "Pinocchio (Danger)"
9. "Beautiful Goodbye"
10. "Sorry (Dear Daddy)" (Luna, Krystal)

Act 3

11. "Shadow" / "Sweet Witches" / "Milk"
12. "Ice Cream"
13. "Nu ABO"
14. "Traveler" / "Zig Zag"
15. "Airplane"
16. "Jet"
17. "Beautiful Stranger" (Amber, Luna & Krystal)

Act 4

18. "Rainbow"
19. "Pretty Girl"
20. "Diamond" (Boom Bang Boom remix)
21. "Cowboy"
22. "Rum Pum Pum Pum"
23. "Step" (with "Shake That Brass" interlude)

Act 5

24. "4 Walls" (Japanese version)
25. "Papi"
26. "Deja Vu"
27. "Rude Love"
28. "Cash Me Out"

Encore

29. "All Mine"
30. "Hot Summer" (Japanese version)
31. "Ending Page"

== Tour dates ==
Date	City	Country	Venue	Attendance
January 29, 2016	Seoul	South Korea	Olympic Hall	9,000
January 30, 2016	Seoul	South Korea	Olympic Hall	9,000
January 31, 2016	Seoul	South Korea	Olympic Hall	9,000
February 20, 2016	Tokyo	Japan	Ariake Coliseum	16,000
February 21, 2016	Tokyo	Japan	Ariake Coliseum	16,000
February 23, 2016	Fukuoka	Japan	Fukuoka Sunpalace	9,500
February 25, 2016	Osaka	Japan	Orix Theater	9,500
February 26, 2016	Osaka	Japan	Orix Theater	9,500
February 28, 2016	Nagoya	Japan	NGK Civic Center Forest Hall	9,500
November 2, 2016	Yokohama	Japan	Yokohama Arena	18,000
November 3, 2016	Yokohama	Japan	Yokohama Arena	18,000
Total				52,500

== DVD ==
f(x) Dimension 4 - Docking Station in Japan

Video by f(x)
- Released: July 6, 2016
- Recorded: 2016
- Genre: K-pop
- Labels: SM; Avex Trax

f(x) Dimension 4 – Docking Station in Japan is the first DVD release from South Korean girl group f(x). It was released on July 6, 2016, in Japan.

=== History ===
The DVD and Blu-ray features their first Asia tour, visiting more than 6 venues for a total of 11 shows. There will be two different versions: a DVD and Blu-ray version. Both editions will come with footage content, with photobook pamphlet and a tour documentary.

=== Track list ===
Disc 1
No.	Title	Length
1.	"Intro"
2.	"Electric Shock"
3.	"Red Light (Rock Version)"
4.	"Dangerous"
5.	"Dracula"
6.	"Gangsta Boy"
7.	"Toy"
8.	"라차타 (LA chA TA)"
9.	"Me+U"
10.	"피노키오 (Danger [Pinocchio])"
11.	"Beautiful Goodbye"
12.	"Sorry (Dear. Daddy)"
13.	"미행 (Shadow; 그림자)"
14.	"빙그르 (Sweet Witches)"
15.	"MILK"
16.	"아이스크림 (Ice Cream)"
17.	"NU 예삐오 (NU ABO)"
18.	"Traveler"
19.	"지그재그 (Zig Zag)"
20.	"Airplane"
21.	"제트별 (Jet)"
22.	"Beautiful Stranger"
23.	"무지개 (Rainbow)"
24.	"Pretty Girl"
25.	"Diamond"
26.	"첫 사랑니 (Rum Pum Pum Pum)"
27.	"Step (+ Shake That Brass)"
28.	"4 Walls"
29.	"Papi"
30.	"Déjà Vu"
31.	"Rude Love"
32.	"Cash Me Out"

Disc 2
No.	Title	Length
33.	"So Into You"
34.	"Hot Summer"
35.	"Ending Page"

=== Release history ===
Country	Date	Distributing label	Format
South Korea	July 6, 2016	SM Entertainment	DVD
Various	July 6, 2016	SM Entertainment	DVD
