= Red Light (f(x) song) =

"Red Light"

Single by f(x)

from the album Red Light
- Released: July 3, 2014
- Genre: electronic house
- Length: 3:32
- Label: SM Entertainment
- Composers: Bryan Jarett; Daniel Ullmann; Maegan Cottone; Allison Kaplan; Sherry St. Germain; Casper & B.
- Lyricist: Kenzie

F(x) singles chronology
| "Rum Pum Pum Pum" (2013) | "Red Light" (2014) | "4 Walls" (2015) |

Red Light is a song recorded by the South Korean girl group f(x). It was released as the lead single from the group's third studio album, Red Light, on July 7, 2014, through SM Entertainment.

== Composition ==
Red Light “is an electronic house with an impressive reversal of the rhythm from an arbon beat to a house beat” also “with an austere trap drum”. Lyrically, the song asks to “stop for a moment and think about the precious things in life again.” The song criticizes the Sewol Ferry incident.

== Music video ==
In the music video, “Krystal holds a burning book; the group runs away from something or possibly someone, while dolls stand in line, listening — or are perhaps being indoctrinated — by a man speaking in a black-white video.” The music video surpassed 2 million views within less than 24 hours.
