= 4 Walls (album) =

- Digital and "Orange" version cover

Studio album by f(x)
- Released: October 27, 2015
- Recorded: 2015
- Studios: SM Studios, Seoul, South Korea
- Genres: Electropop; house; synth-pop
- Length: 35:18
- Language: Korean
- Labels: SM Entertainment; Genie Music
- Producers: LDN Noise; Tay Jasper; Adrian McKinnon; Andreas Öberg; Maria Marcus; Dsign Music; Ryan S. Jhun; Anjulie Persaud; Syron; Kenzie; Taylor Parks; Jussi Karvinen; The Stereotypes; Ylva Dimberg; Shaun; David Dawood; Pelli; Makeba Riddick; Bonnie McKee; Carly Rae Jepsen; Matt Radosevich; Steve Robson; Hwang Hyun

F(x) chronology
Red Light (2014)	4 Walls (2015)	4 walls / COWBOY (2016)

Singles from 4 Walls
- 1. "4 Walls" Released: October 27, 2015

4 Walls is the fourth studio album by South Korea-based girl group f(x), released by SM Entertainment and Genie Music on October 27, 2015. A predominantly electropop and synth-pop record that incorporates various genres, such as house, EDM and UK garage, 4 Walls was composed by several production teams and songwriters, namely LDN Noise, The Stereotypes, Kenzie, Ryan S. Jhun, Makeba Riddick, Carly Rae Jepsen, among others, with Lee Soo-man served as the executive producer of the release. It marked f(x)'s first major release since Red Light in July 2014, and subsequently their first and currently only major release as a quartet since the departure of former member Sulli in August 2015.

Upon its release, 4 Walls was praised by music critics for increasingly showcasing all members' vocal abilities with "trendy" production. The album also attained commercial success, becoming their fifth and final chart-topper on the Gaon Album Chart, and has since sold over 81,000 physical copies in South Korea as of March 2016. It also earned success for f(x) in the United States, becoming their second release to achieve No. 1 on the Billboard World Albums Chart and charted at number thirty-nine on the Japanese Oricon Albums Chart.

To promote the album, its titular track was released on October 27, 2015, to both critical and commercial success, peaking at number two on both the Gaon Digital Chart and the Billboard World Digital Songs. The group also appeared and performed the single on several music programs, including M Countdown, Music Bank and Show! Music Core. The group further embarked on their first concert tour, titled Dimension 4 – Docking Station, which visited South Korea and Japan in January and February 2016, to promote the majority of the album and their past releases.

== Background ==
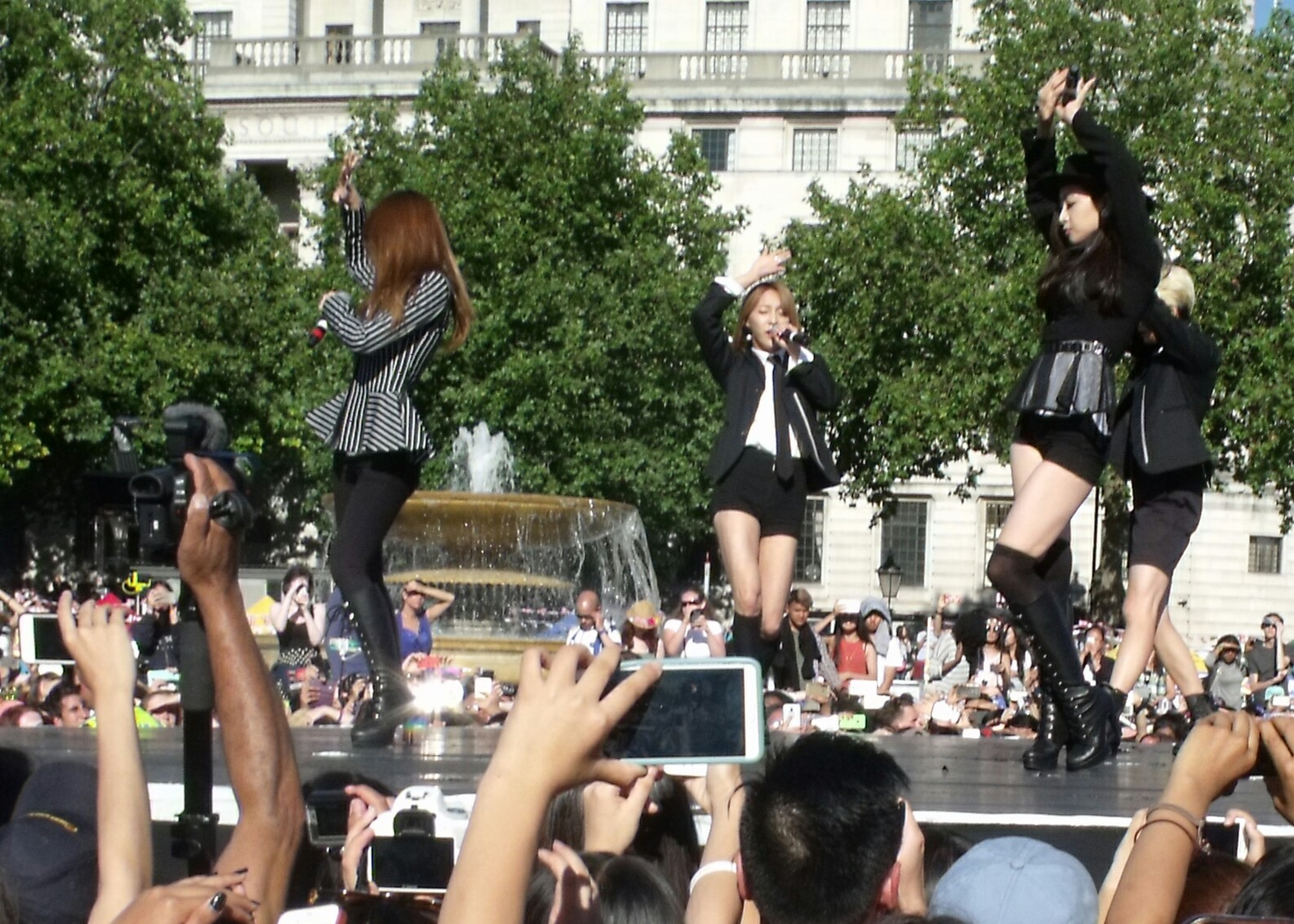
f(x) performing at the 2015 London Korean Festival: Imagine Your Korea on August 9, 2015, in London

South Korea-based girl group f(x) had been known as a five-member girl group, with its original lineup consisting of members Krystal, Amber, Victoria, Sulli, and Luna. The group's last release as a five-member group was Red Light, released in July 2014. During the promotion of Red Light, member Sulli did not participate in live performances due to her "suffering from continual negative comments and false rumors," according to the group's parent company S.M. Entertainment's official statement on July 25, 2014. f(x)'s promotional activities thereafter involved the four other members, while Sulli took a career hiatus. On August 7, 2015, it was announced that Sulli had officially withdrawn from the group to focus on her acting career, and f(x) would continue to operate as a four-member group.

== Release and promotion ==
f(x) was announced to be working on its then-forthcoming studio album on September 11, 2015, when the group traveled to Jeju Island to film a music video. The album, titled 4 Walls, was released digitally worldwide on October 27, 2015, by S.M. Entertainment. In South Korea, the album was distributed digitally and physically by S.M. Entertainment and KT Music. The music video for the title track "4 Walls" was released simultaneously. The song impacted Korean Broadcasting System's "K-Pop Connection" radio on October 29. Art director Min Hee-jin commissioned an art exhibition to promote the album.

Following the release of the album, f(x) appeared and performed on several music programs. Its first televised appearance was on October 29, 2015, on Mnet's M Countdown, where the group performed "4 Walls" and "Diamond". The group subsequently appeared on KBS' Music Bank and MBC's Show! Music Core on the two following days, respectively. To further promote the album, f(x) embarked on their debut concert tour Dimension 4 – Docking Station. The tour kicked off in Seoul, South Korea at Olympic Park from January 29 to 31, 2016, and further included six shows in four cities of Japan: Tokyo, Fukuoka, Osaka and Nagoya. The tour lasted from February 20 to 28, 2016.

== Composition ==
"4 Walls"
The opening track "4 Walls" is described as a hybrid of UK garage and tropical house that incorporates "slinky" synthesizers and "dreamy" hooks.

The album, in the words of Pitchfork Media, keeps up with f(x)'s signature electropop and synthpop styles that the group cultivated through its previous albums Pink Tape (2013) and Red Light (2014). Jeff Benjamin of Billboard noted the emphasis on house and dance genres on the album. The opening track "4 Walls" was described as a tropical house song with "slinky" synthesizers and "dreamy" hooks by The Star. It was characterized as an "update" of UK garage by Spin, while Billboard detailed it as having a deep house sound. The next song, "Glitter", is an R&B and synthpop number. "Deja Vu" mixes industrial beats with glitch pop sounds, while "X" draws influences from the 1980s funk, 1990s disco and R&B.

"Rude Love" is described as a piano house song with dance fusion. "Diamond" is an electropop song, while "Traveler" features retro-styled melodies and smooth rap verses. The track "Papi", instrumented by synthesizers, infuses Latin music and EDM styles. "Cash Me Out" is an EDM song that incorporates elements of American electropop. It is a Korean cover of Swedish singer Zara Larsson's song of the same title off her 2013 EP Allow Me to Reintroduce Myself. The album closer "When I'm Alone" is a synthpop track which was initially written by Canadian singer Carly Rae Jepsen during recording sessions for her third studio album Emotion (2015), but its inclusion was withdrawn and its rights were later purchased by S.M. Entertainment.

== Critical reception ==
Professional ratings
Review scores
Source	Rating
Billboard	4/5 stars
Pitchfork	7.3/10
Spin	7/10
The Star	3.5/5 stars

4 Walls was subject to favorable reviews from music critics. Jeff Benjamin of Billboard magazine shared that despite the fact that the album was "arguably worse" than f(x)'s previous albums Pink Tape (2013) and Red Light (2014), it allowed the other members to showcase their vocal abilities more following the departure of Sulli. He praised it as a "rarity in K-pop to do once" by "finding the right sonicscapes" and appreciated the "house and trendy dance" production. Benjamin subsequently named 4 Walls the second best K-pop album of 2015, writing: "Known for crafting some of the best full-length K-pop albums, f(x) did not disappoint with their long-awaited 4 Walls comeback."

Sheldon Pearce, writing for Pitchfork, described the record as a "superficial rebirth" of f(x) following the group's lineup change and commented that the other members had the chance to express their talents more, particularly with Amber's alto "harmonies" on "Rude Love". Jakob Dorof, upon reviewing the album for Spin, disliked the songs "Deja Vu", "Papi", "Cash Me Out" and "When I'm Alone". He nonetheless labeled them "minor misgivings" and complimented 4 Walls on featuring "sophisticated and innovative" musical styles that could "signal a surprise second life for the world's greatest living pop group." Echoing Dorof's viewpoint, Chester Chin of The Star was not impressed by the inclusion of the "derivative" tracks "Glitter" and "Cash Me Out", yet expressed his admiration for the "solid and edgy" album's "more cohesive" sound as well as "more polished and sharper" beats.

== Commercial performance ==
4 Walls was a commercial success in South Korea, and also charted in Japan and the United States. It debuted atop South Korea's Gaon Album Chart on the chart issue dated October 25–31, 2015. It was the fourth best-selling physical album of October 2015 in South Korea, with sales figures standing at 65,933 copies. The album was additionally the eighteenth highest-selling album of November with 7,820 units sold. Overall, it ranked at number thirty-three on the Gaon's 2015 year-end album chart, with accumulated sales of 75,625 copies. 4 Walls debuted at number thirty-nine on Japan's Oricon Albums Chart on November 16, 2015. It peaked at number one on the US Billboard World Albums Chart on November 14, 2015, becoming f(x)'s second number one on the chart following 2013's Pink Tape. 4 Walls was the group's best-charting album on the US Heatseekers Albums Chart, where it charted at number seven. The single "4 Walls" debuted at number two on South Korea's Gaon Digital Chart for the week of October 25, 2015. It was the twenty-sixth best-selling single of October 2015 (199,976 digital units sold), and the twelfth best-selling single of November 2015 (247,232 digital units sold) in South Korea. The track debuted at number two on the US Billboard World Digital Songs, becoming their highest-charting song on the chart.

== Track listing ==
4 Walls track listing
No.	Title	Lyrics	Music	Arrangement	Length
1.	"4 Walls"	Lee Seu-ran	LDN Noise; Tay Jasper; Adrian McKinnon	LDN Noise	3:27
2.	"Glitter"	Lee Seu-ran	Andreas Öberg; Maria Marcus	Öberg; Marcus	2:59
3.	"Deja Vu"	Jo Yoon-kyung	Nermin Harambašić; Camilla North; Lloyd Lawrence Lorenz; Adam Kapit; Ryan S. Jhun; Kine J. Hansen	Harambašić; North; Lorenz; Kapit; Jhun; Hansen	3:40
4.	"X"	Kim In-hyung; Shin Hye-sun	Jhun; Nicolas Jack Scapa (10K Islands); Anjulie Persaud; Brian Robertson; Fransisca Hall	Jhun; Scapa; Persaud; Robertson; Hall	3:23
5.	"Rude Love"	100% Seo-jeong	LDN Noise; Syron; Andrew Jackson	LDN Noise	4:18
6.	"Diamond"	Young-hu Kim	Jhun; Taylor Parks; Jussi Karvinen	Jhun; Parks	3:59
7.	"Traveler" (featuring Zico of Block B)	JQ; Kim Jin-ju; Zico	The Stereotypes	The Stereotypes	3:38
8.	"Papi"	Kenzie	Kenzie; LDN Noise; Shaun; Ylva Dimberg	LDN Noise; Shaun	3:05
9.	"Cash Me Out"	Kenzie	David Dawood; Mark Pellizzer; Makeba Riddick	Dawood; Pellizzer; Riddick	3:21
10.	"When I'm Alone"	Jo Yoon-kyung	Bonnie McKee; Carly Rae Jepsen; Matt Radosevich; Steve Robson; Hwang Hyun (MonoTree)	McKee; Jepsen; Radosevich; Robson; Hwang	3:23
Total length:					35:18

== Charts ==
=== Weekly charts ===
Weekly chart performance for 4 Walls
Chart (2015)	Peak position
Japanese Albums (Oricon)	39
South Korean Albums (Gaon)	1
US Heatseekers Albums (Billboard)	7
US World Albums (Billboard)	1

=== Monthly chart ===
Monthly chart performance for 4 Walls
Chart (2015)	Position
South Korean Albums (Gaon)	4

=== Year-end chart ===
Year-end chart performance for 4 Walls
Chart (2015)	Position
South Korean Albums (Gaon)	33

== Accolades ==
=== Awards and nominations ===
Awards and nominations for 4 Walls
Ceremony	Year	Category	Result	Ref.
Golden Disc Awards	2016	Album Bonsang	Won	
Golden Disc Awards	2016	Album Daesang	Nominated	
Korean Music Awards	2016	Best Dance & Electronic Album	Nominated	
Seoul Music Awards	2016	Bonsang Award	Nominated	

=== Listicles ===
Year-end lists
Critic/Publication	List	Rank	Ref
Billboard	The 10 Best K-pop Albums of 2015	2	

== Release history ==
Release history and formats for 4 Walls
Region	Date	Format	Distributor
South Korea	October 27, 2015	CD, digital download	S.M. Entertainment, KT Music
Various	October 27, 2015	Digital download	SM Entertainment
