= All Mine (f(x) song) =

2016 single by f(x)

"All Mine"

Single by f(x)

from the album SM Station Season 1
- Released: July 22, 2016
- Recorded: 2016
- Studio: InGrid (Seoul)
- Genre: EDM
- Length: 3:23
- Label: SM
- Composers: Greg Bonnick; Hayden Chapman; Andre Merritt; Breana Marin
- Lyricists: Lee Seu-ran; Kim Min-jeong
- Producer: LDN Noise

F(x) singles chronology
"Wish List" (2015)	"All Mine" (2016)

Music video
- "All Mine" on YouTube

"All Mine" is a song recorded by South Korean girl group f(x) for the first season of SM Station, a weekly digital music project by their label SM Entertainment. The song was released through the project on July 22, 2016, serving as the group's first release since their Christmas single "Wish List" in December 2015, and subsequently their last Korean single to date as a quartet.

== Background and release ==
On July 20, 2016, it was announced that f(x) would be the next artist to release a single for the SM Station project, with the title, "All Mine", on July 22. The single was released digitally at midnight on July 22, 2016, by SM Entertainment, accompanied by a music video.

== Music video ==
The music video was filmed during f(x)'s stay in Japan for SM Town Live World Tour V in Osaka. It was directed and edited by the group's rapper, Amber.

== Track listing ==
- Digital download and streaming
1. "All Mine" – 3:24
2. "All Mine" (instrumental) – 3:24

== Credits and personnel ==
Studio

- In Grid Studio – recording, digital editing
- SM Blue Ocean Studio – mixing
- Sterling Sound – mastering

Personnel

- SM Entertainment – executive producer
- Lee Soo-man – producer
- Kim Young-min – executive supervisor
- f(x) – vocals, background vocals
- Lee Seu-ran – lyrics
- Kim Min-jeong – lyrics
- LDN Noise – producer, composition, arrangement
- Andre Merritt – composition
- Breana Marin – composition, background vocals
- Kenzie – vocal directing
- Jung Eun-kyung – recording, digital editing
- Kim Cheol-sun – mixing
- Tom Coyne – mastering

== Charts ==
=== Weekly charts ===
Weekly chart performance for "All Mine"
Chart (2016)	Peak position
South Korea (Circle)	12

=== Monthly charts ===
Monthly chart performance for "All Mine"
Chart (2016)	Position
South Korea (Circle)	60

== Release history ==
Region	Date	Format	Label
Various	July 22, 2016	Digital download; streaming	SM
