= 4 Walls (song) =

- CD-only cover for "4 Walls"/"Cowboy"

Single by f(x)

from the album 4 Walls
- A-side: "Cowboy" (JP ver.)
- Released: October 27, 2015; November 2, 2016 (JP)
- Recorded: 2015
- Studio: SM Studios, Seoul
- Genre: Tropical house • deep house
- Length: 3:28
- Label: SM Entertainment; Genie Music; Avex Trax
- Composers: LDN Noise; Tay Jasper; Adrian McKinnon tadeo
- Lyricist: Lee Seu-ran

F(x) singles chronology
"Red Light" (2014)	"4 Walls" (2015)	"Wish List" (2015)

Music video
- "4 Walls" on YouTube

"4 Walls" is a song recorded by South Korean girl group f(x) for their fourth studio album of the same title. The song was written by Jam Factory's Lee Seu-ran, whilst the music was composed by LDN Noise, Tay Jasper, and Adrian McKinnon. It was released on October 27, 2015 as the lead single in conjunction with the release of the album through SM Entertainment, and marked the group's first single since the departure of Sulli in 2015. Musically, "4 Walls" is described as a dance-oriented tropical house song, incorporating stylistic elements from UK garage and deep house. It was released as the group's second double A-side CD single in Japan with a new track "Cowboy" on November 2, 2016.

The track garnered generally favorable reviews from music critics, most of whom highlighted as one of the album's best tracks and complimented the song's music styles. Commercially, the song peaked at number two on both the Gaon Digital Chart and the US Billboard World Digital Songs chart. The butterfly effect-inspired accompanying music video was posted to SM's YouTube channel in conjunction with the single and features the members witnessing themselves in different dimensions. The group promoted the song by performing it on several South Korean music programs throughout late-October and November 2015, including Music Bank and M Countdown.

== Background and release ==
South Korean girl group f(x) had achieved success in South Korea, and through Asia with singles including "Electric Shock" and "Hot Summer" as a five-piece group, consisting of Victoria Song, Amber Liu, Luna, Krystal Jung and Sulli. During the promotion of the group's third studio album Red Light (2014), member Sulli did not participate in live performances due to her "suffering from continual negative comments and false rumors", according to the group's parent company S.M. Entertainment's official statement on July 25, 2014. f(x)'s promotional activities thereafter involved the four other members, while Sulli took a career hiatus. On August 7, 2015, it was announced that Sulli had officially withdrawn from the group to focus on her acting career, and f(x) would continue to promote as a four-member group.

On September 11, 2015, the group confirmed work on a then-upcoming studio titled 4 Walls, and the release of a new single and music video, which was revealed to be the title track to the album. It premiered on October 27, 2015, the same date as the album's release, as the lead single. A Japanese version of the track was released alongside the newly-recorded "Cowboy" (stylized as "COWBOY"), as a double A-side single in Japan on November 2, 2016 via Avex Trax.

== Composition and style ==
"4 Walls" was written by Jam Factory member Lee Seu-ran, whilst composing and production was handled by LDN Noise, Tay Jasper, and Adrian McKinnon. Lee Soo-man, the former president at S.M. Entertainment, also served as the executive producer to the track. Musically, it is a song heavily influenced by electronic dance music. It was described as a tropical house song with "slinky" synthesizers and "dreamy" hooks by The Star's Chester Chin. It was characterized as a UK garage "upgrade" by Spin, while Jeff Benjamin at Billboard detailed it as having a deep house sound. In a capsule review for PopMatters, Scott Interrante summed up the song as "dance-oriented" and stated that the track "uses a funky house beat to craft a cool pop song with a subdued vibe and memorable chorus." John Chiaverina from Kpopstarz.com wrote an extended review on the track, noting that the song was heavily inspired by the British music scene and Western electronic dance music. Chiavernica compared the track's composition and vocals to a large variety of work by different artists, including Disclosure, Mariah Carey, Pitbull, and the song "Show Me Love" by American vocalist Robin S.

== Critical response ==
Upon its release, the track garnered generally favorable reviews from music critics. Daniel Montesinos-Donaghy from Vice.com gave the song a positive review, feeling that "the group's romantic fervor fulfils the euphoria that drives some of the best house and pop music." An editor at Seoulbeats.com praised the composition and production of the song, stating "It achieves this laid back intensity as the song progresses and manages to have this without the usual heavy bass drop or shift in chords that one can find in usual K-pop songs."

Jeff Benjamin from Billboard complimented the song's composition, and compared it to the song "View" by South Korean boy band and brother group to f(x), Shinee; he explained, "The deep house sound is perfect for f(x) and creates a superior sister to "View," complete with moments of belting, rapping and even an awesome synthy breakdown at the bridge." Writing for Pitchfork, Sheldon Pearce described the song as a "superficial rebirth", further explaining, "though the album's lead single and title track has veiled references to changing and becoming new, f(x)'s synthpop bounce remains steadfast and uncompromised." He also believed that "though Sulli was undoubtedly a standout among the group, her departure allows others to grab the spotlight". Jakob Dorof from Spin discussed the album's "minor misgivings", and contrasted it with the title track, stating "Nowhere moreso than its title track, a deft U.K. garage upgrade that becomes definitively K-pop with rapper Amber's surprisingly fire verse and a visionary double-bridge that shifts time, feel and genre with a logic all its own." Chester Chin, writing for The Star, believed that the song's tropical and deep house elements were "leaps and bounds ahead of the conventional K-pop fares".

"4 Walls" on critic lists
Publication	List	Rank	Ref.
Billboard	The 100 Greatest K-pop Songs of the 2010s	9	
Dazed	The Top 20 K-pop Tracks of 2015	4	
Melon	Top 100 K-pop Songs of All Time	40	
Music Y	Top 10 Songs of 2015	2	
PopMatters	The Best K-pop of 2015	5	
Rolling Stone	100 Greatest Songs in the History of Korean Pop Music	17	
Vice	The Top 20 K-pop Songs of 2015	1	

== Commercial performance ==
Commercially, "4 Walls" was successful in South Korea. It debuted at number two on South Korea's Gaon Digital Chart for the week of October 25, 2015. It was the twenty-sixth best-selling single of October 2015 (199,976 digital units sold), and the twelfth best-selling single of November 2015 (247,232 digital units sold) in South Korea. As of June 2016, the track has sold over 619,022 units in South Korea, the group's highest selling single since "Rum Pum Pum Pum" with over 900,000 units sold. The track debuted at number two on the US Billboard World Digital Songs, becoming their highest-charting song on the chart.

== Accolades ==
Awards and nominations
Year	Organization	Award	Result
2015	Mnet Asian Music Awards	Best Music Video	Nominated
2016	Golden Disc Awards	Digital Bonsang	Nominated
2016	Korean Music Awards	Best Dance & Electronic Song	Nominated
2016	Seoul Music Awards	Bonsang Award	Nominated

Music program wins
Program	Date	Ref.
M Countdown	November 5, 2015	
M Countdown	November 19, 2015	
Music Bank	November 6, 2015	
Music Bank	November 13, 2015	
The Show	November 10, 2015	

== Track listing ==
Japanese CD single

1. "4 Walls" – 3:28
2. "Cowboy" – 3:21
3. "4 Walls" (Instrumental) – 3:28
4. "Cowboy" (Instrumental) – 3:21

4 Walls / Cowboy DVD

1. "4 Walls" (music video; Japanese version)
2. "4 Walls" (making of music video; Japanese version)
3. "Making of the single's cover"

== Credits and personnel ==
Credits adapted by the liner notes of the 4 Walls album.

Studio

- In Grid Studio – recording, digital editing
- SM Yellow Tail Studio – mixing
- Sterling Sound – mastering

Personnel

- SM Entertainment – executive producer
- Lee Soo-man – producer
- Kim Young-min – executive supervisor
- f(x) – vocals, background vocals
- Lee Seu-ran – Korean lyrics
- Sara Sakurai – Japanese lyrics
- LDN Noise – producer, composition, arrangement
- Tay Jasper – composition
- Adrian McKinnon – composition
- Kim Jin-hwan – vocal directing
- Jung Eun-kyung – recording, digital editing
- Koo Jong-pil – mixing
- Tom Coyne – mastering

== Charts ==
=== Weekly charts ===
Chart (2015)	Peak position
Japan Weekly Singles (Oricon) "4 Walls / Cowboy"	15
South Korea (Gaon)	2
US World Digital Songs (Billboard)	2

=== Monthly charts ===
Chart (2015)	Position
South Korea (Gaon) – October	26
South Korea (Gaon) – November	12

== Release history ==
Region	Date	Format	Distributor
Various	October 27, 2015	Digital download, streaming	S.M. Entertainment
Japan	November 2, 2016	CD single, CD+DVD	Avex Trax
