= Summer Special: Pinocchio / Hot Summer =

Single by f(x)
- A-side: "Pinocchio (Danger)"
- B-side: "Hot Summer"
- Released: July 22, 2015
- Recorded: 2011
- Genre: J-pop, dance-pop, electropop
- Length: 7:45
- Label: Avex Trax

"Summer Special: Pinocchio / Hot Summer" is the first Japanese physical single by South Korean girl group f(x). The single was recorded in 2011 and released on July 22, 2015, by Avex Trax.

== Background and release ==
A teaser video for the music video of Hot Summer was released on August 1, 2012, via Avex's official YouTube channel. The full video subsequently appeared online a few days later on August 5, 2012.

The video is set in a desert, with pink and white star shaped props and pink cotton candy as clouds in the background. The video begins with the group wearing all white, walking slowly towards the camera. The video then cuts to another set with close-up shots of the group revealing electric blue outfits, topped with elaborate accessories. A street scene is also featured, where the group wears red outfits in front of the star-shaped prop while throwing paint over the buildings and at the camera. The video ends with the desert as the camera pans back.

On May 30, 2015, SM Entertainment announced that the group will release their first Japanese single titled "Summer Special: Pinocchio / Hot Summer", on July 22, 2015. The single will contain the Japanese versions of Pinocchio (Danger) and Hot Summer. The DVD will contain the Japanese music videos of these two songs.

At the event held in Osaka, on July 22, 2015, for the release of the single, only Krystal, Luna and Amber were present. Victoria was absent for health reasons and her activities in China; she also had a commitment with the filming of the 2016 remake of My Best Friend's Wedding in England. At the time of the release, Sulli had still not returned from her break.

A few days later, on August 7, it was announced that Sulli had officially withdrawn from the group to focus on an acting career, and that the group will continue to promote as four members with SM managing Sulli's acting endeavors.

The single peaked at #23 on the Oricon Weekly Chart and sold a total of 6,199 copies.

== Track listing ==
No.	Title	Length
1.	"Pinocchio (Danger)" (Japanese version)	3:47
2.	"Hot Summer" (Japanese version)	3:58
Total length:		7:45

DVD
No.	Title	Length
1.	"Pinocchio (Danger)" (Promotional Video; PV)	3:47
2.	"Hot Summer" (Promotional Video; PV)	3:58
Total length:		7:45
