= F(x) (group) =

South Korean girl group

f(x)
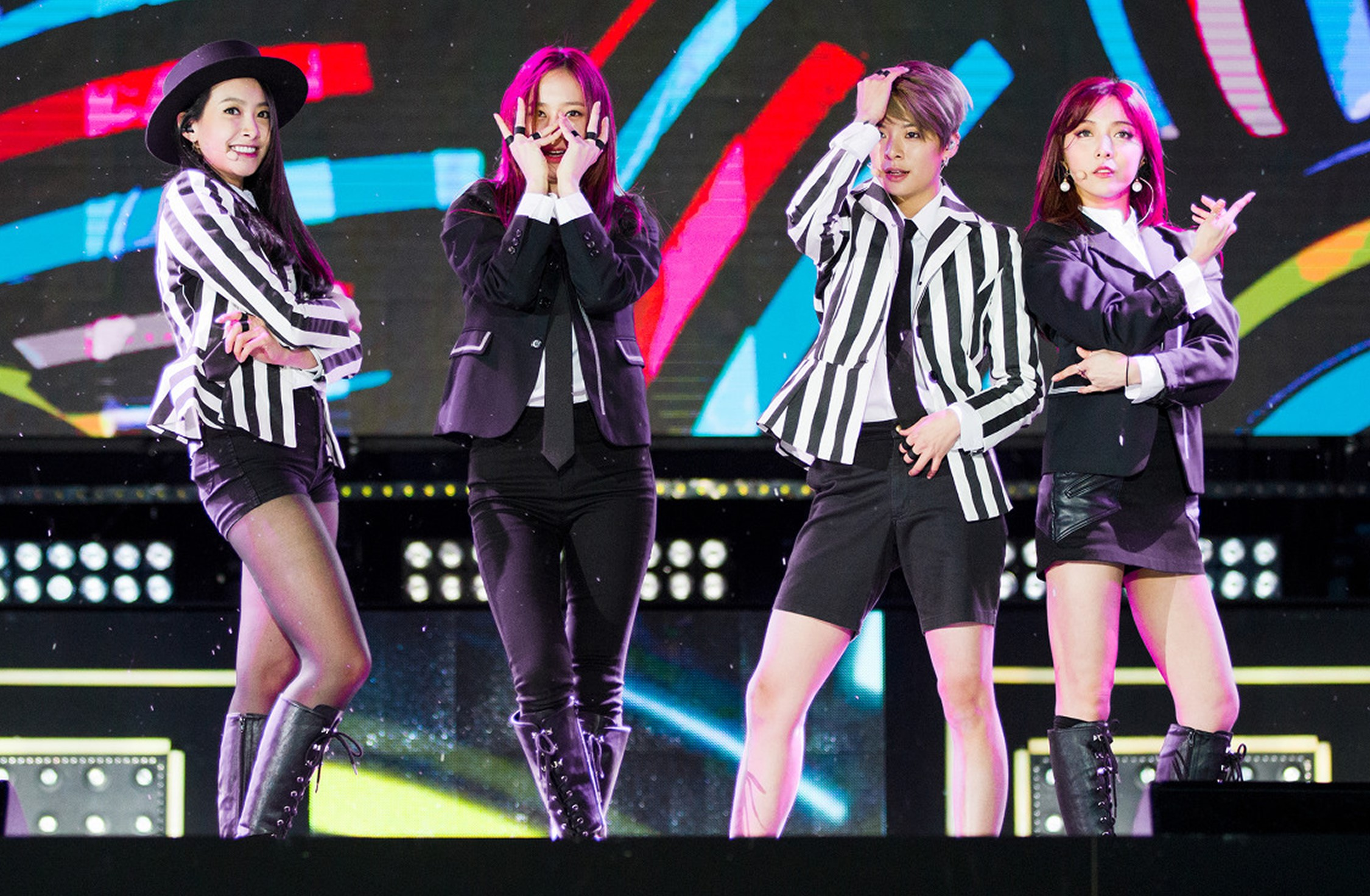
- f(x) performing at Jeju K-pop Festival in October 2015; From left to right: Victoria, Krystal, Amber, and Luna

Background information
- Origin: Seoul, South Korea
- Genres: K-pop; electropop; synth-pop; art pop; EDM
- Years active: 2009–2016; 2019 (Note: Three-act without leader Victoria performance at SM Town Live 2019 in Tokyo concert)
- Labels: SM; Avex Trax
- Members: Victoria; Amber; Luna; Krystal
- Past members: Sulli
- Website: f(x) Japan website

f(x) (/ˌɛf.ˈɛks/; Korean: 에프엑스; RR: Epeuekseu) is a South Korean girl group, consisting of Victoria, Amber, Luna, Krystal, and previously Sulli until her departure from the group in August 2015. Formed by SM, f(x) officially debuted in September 2009 with the release of the digital single "La Cha Ta".

Their debut studio album, Pinocchio (2011), and their two extended plays Nu Abo and Electric Shock produced three number-one singles on South Korea's Gaon Digital Chart. Their acclaimed second studio album, Pink Tape (2013), was the only K-pop album on US music channel Fuse's "41 Best Albums of 2013", the only idol album to be featured in Korean critics' definitive list of "Top 100 Classic Albums of All Time", and was named "Greatest K-pop Album of the 2010s" by Billboard. The group's third and fourth albums, Red Light (2014) and 4 Walls (2015), were commercially successful and well received by music critics. Following the release of the SM Station single "All Mine" in 2016, the group halted group promotions and the members have embarked on individual music, acting, and modelling careers. In August 2019, f(x) officially reunited as a three-piece (without Victoria) and performed at the three-night SM Town Live 2019 in Tokyo concert. As of 2025, f(x) has been removed from the artist section on the official SM Entertainment website.

Known for their eclectic, electropop-based sound, f(x) is one of the first few recognized K-pop groups internationally, becoming the first K-pop act to perform at SXSW. In 2017, Billboard ranked f(x) at number seven on their "Top 10 K-pop Girl Groups of the Past Decade" list.

== Name ==
f(x) is used as the notation for functions in mathematics. It is used to symbolize their various activities, based on the various talents and attractiveness of the members, like a function in which the output or results change depending on the input value of x. In addition, "f" symbolizes flower and "x" symbolizes 'X' on the female chromosome XX which, taken together, symbolizes "flower reminiscent of women".

== History ==
=== Pre-debut ===
Krystal was scouted by SM Entertainment in 2000 while on a family visit to Korea, along with her sister Jessica (who would go on to be a member of Girls' Generation). She subsequently appeared in a small role in Shinhwa's music video for the song "Wedding March" ("너의 곁에서 2"). Sulli was a child actress, making her first television appearance in 2005 as the young Princess Seonhwa of Silla in SBS's Ballad of Seodong. Luna was recruited by SM following her 2006 appearance on the reality television program Truth Game. Victoria was scouted through a Beijing dance competition in September 2007 after winning first place. In 2008, Amber was cast through S.M. Global Auditions in Los Angeles, California.

=== 2009–2010: Debut and Nu ABO ===
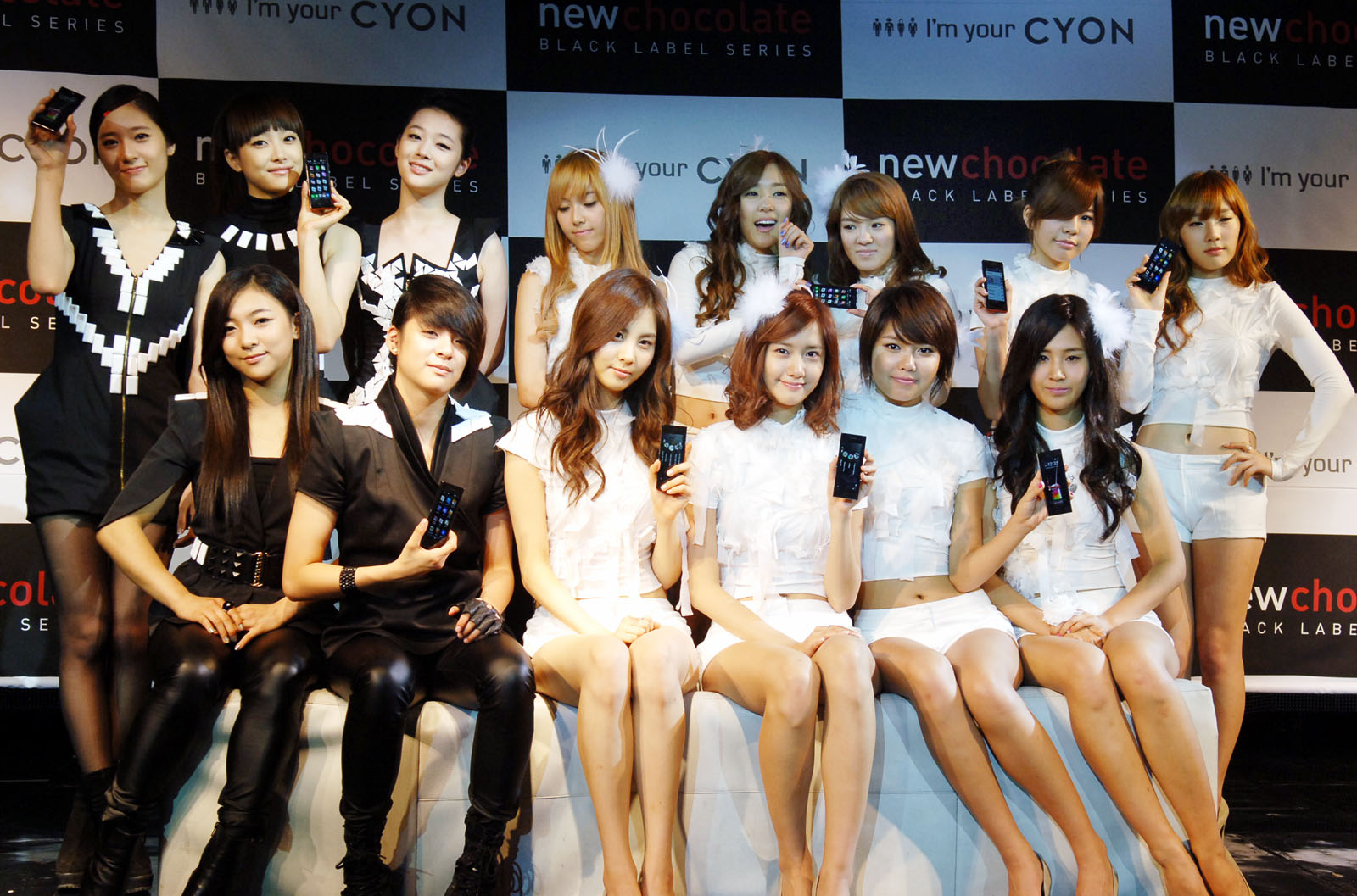
f(x) with Girls' Generation at a showcase for the LG Chocolate cellphone

SM introduced an upcoming girl group f(x) as an "Asia Pop Dance Group" with its goal the group focused on pop dance group. Their debut single "La Cha Ta" was released on September 1, with a showcase held the following day at Samseong Fashion Center in Gangnam. The group's broadcast debut was on September 5, on MBC's Music Core. Shortly after their debut, f(x) featured in promotions of the LG Chocolate cell phone alongside Girls' Generation. Both groups released versions of the song "Chocolate Love"; f(x)'s being an electropop version released on October 8. They also released their first physical single, "Chu~♡", on November 9. A month later, the group appeared as special guests at Girls' Generation's Into The New World concert at the Olympic Fencing Gymnasium, Seoul.

At the start of 2010, f(x) collaborated with the Chinese boy band M.I.C. to promote the LG Cyon cell phone, releasing a Chinese cover of "Lollipop". In April they appeared in their documentary reality programme, Hello f(x). On May 4, the group released their first extended play, Nu ABO. The lead single "Nu ABO" was a commercial success in Korea and become a number-one single on the Gaon Chart. In June, Amber went on hiatus due to an ankle injury, while the remaining members continued group activities without her for the remainder of the year. They promoted the single "Mr Boogie" as a follow-up single from their EP and participated in the SMTown Live '10 World Tour, as well as filming their second documentary reality show, f(x)'s Koala. Towards the end of 2010 it was announced that f(x)'s albums would be distributed under Japanese label Avex Entertainment in Japan, Taiwan, China, and Hong Kong. Amber returned to the group in early 2011.

=== 2011–2012: Pinocchio, Hot Summer, and Electric Shock ===
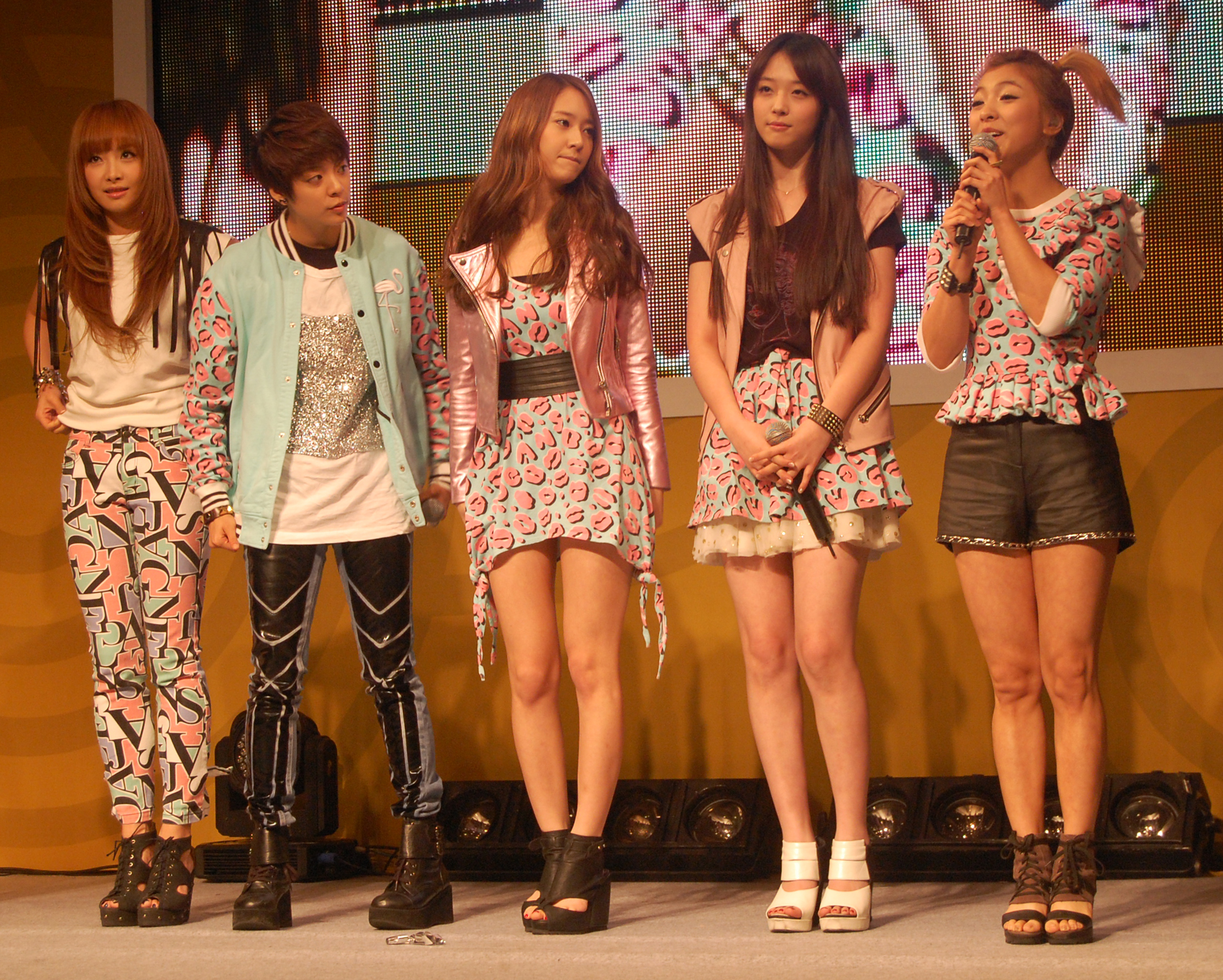
f(x) in December 2011

f(x) released their first full-length studio album Pinocchio in April 2011, with the lead single "Pinocchio (Danger)". The single peaked at number one on the Gaon digital single chart, and the group went on to take eight music show wins. On June 14, Pinocchio was re-released under the title Hot Summer. The repackaged album contained the title track "Hot Summer" (a remake of a Monrose song produced by Thomas Troelsen and Remee), as well as three previously released digital singles: "LA chA TA", "Chu~♡", and "Is It Ok?". "Hot Summer" peaked at #2 on the Gaon digital single chart and was downloaded over 375,000 times in the week of release. The song went on to become one of the most successful singles of 2011 in South Korea, selling 2,909,384 copies by the end of the year. In August, the group released a song called "Garagabana" for the game Bust-a-Move and in December they released a song in English, titled "1, 2, 3", as part of the 2011 Winter SMTown – The Warmest Gift album.

The group released their second EP Electric Shock on June 10, 2012. It was met with critical acclaim and they achieved nine music show wins with the title track "Electric Shock". In November, the group won the 'Best Dance Performance - Female Group' award for "Electric Shock" at the 2012 Mnet Asian Music Awards in Hong Kong. In January 2013, two songs from the EP, "Electric Shock" and "Jet", were nominated for 'Best Dance and Electronic Song' at the 10th Annual Korean Music Awards, with "Electric Shock" going on to win the award.

=== 2013–2014: Pink Tape, critical acclaim, and Red Light ===
In 2013, f(x) was awarded the Digital Bonsang award at the Golden Disk Awards and Seoul Music Awards, as well as the "MBC Music Star Award" at the Melon Music Awards. In March they became the first K-pop artists to perform at SXSW in Austin, Texas. During their visit to the US, the group collaborated with actress Anna Kendrick for a comedy skit for Funny Or Die. On July 29, the group released their second full-length album Pink Tape with the lead single "Rum Pum Pum Pum", and held a showcase titled "f(x) Music Spoiler - Play! Pink Tape" through Naver Music. The album was a success both in Korea and the US, peaking at number one on Billboard's K-pop Hot 100 and World Albums Charts and the Gaon Albums Chart. It was the only Korean album to appear on Fuse's "41 Best Albums of 2013". A track from the album, Airplane, was also ranked third on Billboard's "20 Best K-Pop Songs of 2013".

In 2014, the group won the "Group Artist" award at the 20th Korean Entertainment Arts Awards, the "Disk Bonsang" at the 28th Golden Disk Awards, and the "Best Overseas Artist Performance" award at the Yin Yue Feng Yun Bang Awards in China. On July 7, they released their third studio album, Red Light, with the electronic house title track of the same name. The music video gained 2 million views on YouTube within a day and was again well-received overseas. Shortly after the album was released, it was announced that Sulli was unable to perform with the group for health reasons, and that she would be taking a temporary hiatus.

=== 2015–2016: Sulli's departure, 4 Walls, first concert tour, and hiatus ===
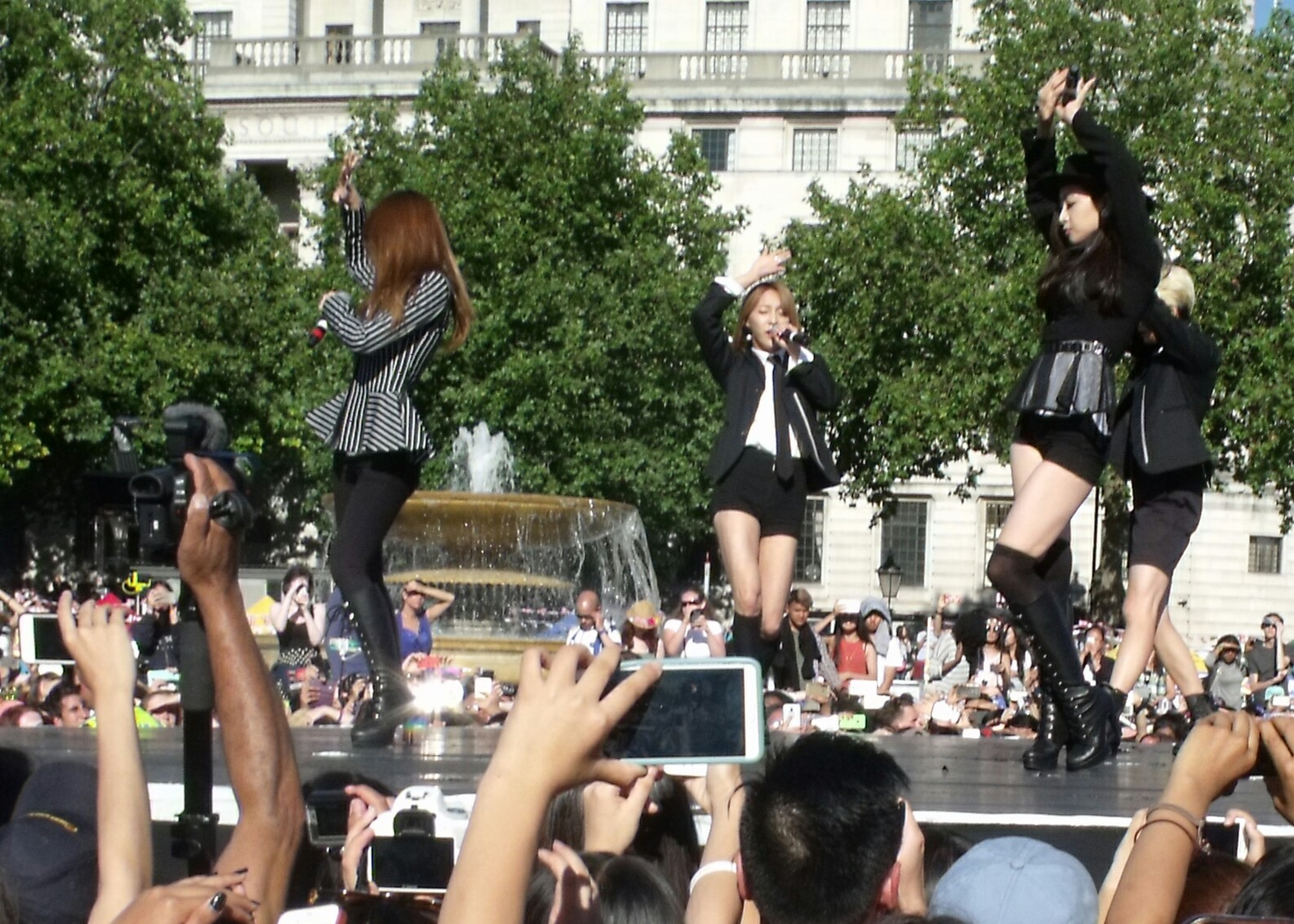
F(x) performing as a four-piece group in Trafalgar Square, in August 2015.

On July 22, 2015, f(x) released a Japanese physical single album, Summer Special Pinocchio / Hot Summer, which debuted at #23 on Oricon's weekly chart. In August, it was announced that Sulli had officially left the group to focus on acting. The remaining four members continued as a group, releasing their fourth studio album, 4 Walls, in October. The album sold 66,000 copies upon its first week of release and was well received by critics. To promote the album's release, the group starred in a web reality program titled f(x)=1cm. In December, they released the single "12:25 (Wish List)" as part of S.M Entertainment's Christmas project, Winter Garden. At the year-end 2015 Mnet Asian Music Awards, f(x) performed with Pet Shop Boys, and won the 'Global Fans Choice' award.

In January 2016, the group won the Disk Bonsang award at the 2016 Golden Disk Awards and commenced their first concert tour, Dimension 4 – Docking Station, in Seoul which continued with six concerts in Japan in February. On January 31, they announced their official fan club name, MeU. On July 22, 2016, f(x) released a new single, "All Mine", through the SM Station project. The song was accompanied by a music video, directed and edited by Amber. On November 2, 2016, f(x) released their second Japanese physical single album, 4 Walls / Cowboy, including a Japanese version of "4 Walls", along with a new song titled "Cowboy", which was performed live on the same day at the group's encore concert in Yokohama. On October 16, the music video for "Electric Shock" surpassed 100 million views on YouTube, making f(x) the third Korean girl group, and sixth Korean group overall to reach this milestone.

=== 2019–2021: Reunion and departures from SM ===
In an interview with Krystal on January 19, 2018, she stated that the members frequently discussed making a comeback but timing never worked out.

In August 2019, f(x) officially reunited and performed together at the three-night SM Town Live 2019 in Tokyo concert as a three-piece (without Victoria). On September 1, Amber announced via her social media accounts that she had not renewed her contract with SM Entertainment. On September 5, SM Entertainment shared that Luna had also not renewed her contract with the company; Victoria also announced her departure from SM on her Instagram, but SM instead reported that Victoria's contract with them was still under discussion. Victoria was eventually reported to remain in SM in some capacity.

On October 14, 2019, following her involvement in some acting projects after leaving the group in 2015, Sulli was found dead in her home from suicide.

On October 12, 2020, it was announced that Krystal had officially left SM, and had signed an exclusive contract with H& Entertainment.

On April 9, 2021, SM announced that Victoria's contract with them had expired. On April 23, during a review video of her activities from debut to present, Luna expressed confusion over f(x) being referred to in the past tense, stating that the group had not yet disbanded.

== Impact ==
In an industry focused more on mini-albums, f(x)'s discography leaned more towards full-length studio albums, releasing four internationally acclaimed albums during their time as a group. In 2015, while reviewing 4 Walls, American music magazine Spin called f(x) the "world's greatest living pop group" at the time. In 2017, Billboard ranked f(x) at number seven on their "Top 10 K-pop Girl Groups of the Past Decade" list.

"Rum Pum Pum Pum" and "4 Walls" were both included on Billboard's "The 100 Greatest K-pop Songs of the 2010s" staff list, at numbers 33 and 9, respectively. Billboard also noted that "Ice Cream Cake" represents a baton pass from f(x) to Red Velvet as the best idol group alive, meaning that f(x) was the former holder of the title.

== Members ==
Inactive members

- Victoria (빅토리아) (2009–2016) – Leader
- Amber (엠버) (2009–2016, 2019)
- Luna (루나) (2009–2016, 2019)
- Krystal (크리스탈) (2009–2016, 2019)

Former members

- Sulli (설리) (2009–2015)

== Discography ==
- Pinocchio (2011)
- Pink Tape (2013)
- Red Light (2014)
- 4 Walls (2015)

== Filmography ==
=== Film ===
Year	Title	Role	Notes
2012	I Am - SM Town Live World Tour in Madison Square Garden	Themselves	Biographical film
2015	SMTown: The Stage	Themselves	Biographical film

=== Television ===
Year	Title	Notes
2010	Hello f(x)	Travelled in Africa, Thailand and Japan.
2010–2011	f(x) Koala	Travelled in Los Angeles, Tokyo and other world-famous cities. Amber was not present due to her ankle injury.
2013	Go! f(x)	
2013	Amazing f(x)	Travelled in New Zealand.
2015	f(x)=1 cm	First reality show after Sulli's departure

== Concerts ==
=== Headlining ===
- Dimension 4 – Docking Station (2016)

=== Concert participation ===
- SM Town Live '10 World Tour (2010–11)
- SM Town Live World Tour III (2012–13)
- SM Town Week (with EXO) (2013)
- SM Town Live World Tour IV (2014–15)
- SM Town Live World Tour V (2016)

== See also ==
- List of best-selling girl groups

== Notes ==
Awards and achievements
Preceded by Girls' Generation	Korean Music Awards: Group Musician of the Year; 2011	Succeeded by Infinite
Preceded by Miss A	14th Mnet Asian Music Awards—Best Female Dance Performance; 2012	Succeeded by Sistar
