= Pink Tape (f(x) album) =

Pink Tape
- Digital cover

Studio album by f(x)
- Released: July 29, 2013
- Recorded: 2013
- Studio: SM Studios (Seoul)
- Genres: Synth-pop; electropop; EDM
- Language: Korean
- Label: SM
- Producer: Lee Soo-man

F(x) chronology
Electric Shock (2012)	Pink Tape (2013)	Red Light (2014)

Singles from Pink Tape
- 1. "Rum Pum Pum Pum" Released: July 29, 2013

Pink Tape is the second studio album by South Korean girl group f(x). The album was released on July 29, 2013, by SM Entertainment. Pink Tape is the first studio album by f(x) in over two years, the last being the repackage of their first album Hot Summer in 2011, and their first Korean release in over a year since 2012's Electric Shock. The album peaked at the number-one position on multiple music charts internationally, including Billboard's World Albums and South Korea's Gaon charts.

Pink Tape garnered widespread critical acclaim; it was the only K-pop album to be featured on US music channel Fuse's list of 41 Best Albums of 2013 and was named the Greatest K-pop Album of the 2010s by Billboard. "Rum Pum Pum Pum" was ranked at number 59 on Billboard's 100 Greatest Girl Group Songs of All Time list. In a panel of 47 music and pop culture critics organized by The Hankyoreh and Melon, it was ranked at number 96 in their list of the Top 100 Korean Albums of All Time, making it the only album by an idol group to make the list.

== Background and development ==
On March 6, 2013, member Sulli hinted about the possibility of a new f(x) release on her me2day account. Later in March, f(x) performed at the SXSW music festival in Austin, Texas, becoming the first K-Pop act to do so. While in the United States, f(x) flew to Los Angeles to rehearse choreography for the upcoming album with choreographer Kevin Maher. Maher and member Amber Liu later tweeted pictures of them rehearsing. While in Los Angeles, the group also filmed a sketch with Anna Kendrick for comedy website Funny or Die. While backstage the group did an interview with the Mnet America show "Danny From L.A.", during which members Amber and Krystal Jung stated they were working on choreography for a new song but had "no idea" when it was due to be released. Amber later added that they hadn't recorded the title track yet and were in a process of "picking and choosing".

In June 2013, a clip from an upcoming variety show starring f(x) entitled "Go f(x)!" was leaked onto video sharing site Daily Motion. It showed the group rehearsing choreography with Kevin Maher. On July 9, an SM Entertainment representative stated that they were currently planning f(x)'s comeback but "[we] are still looking into a specific comeback date".

== Music and lyrics ==
Many music critics commented that contrary to the dominant contemporary K-pop releases of singles and EPs, Pink Tape was a cohesive full-length album that brought forth a refreshing listening experience. It is an amalgam of synth-driven pop styles including electropop and synth-pop, with experimental touches drawing from electronica. Pitchfork critic Sheldon Pearce described the album as a "a pop collage of ambitious sounds and ideas that tinkered with K-pop formulas". Kim Do-heon, in a review for South Korean music webzine IZM, said that the individual tracks of Pink Tape are eclectic in musical styles but altogether form a coherent aesthetic. Billboard journalist Jessica Oak found the album to be experimental and "quirky". The lyrics are predominantly about the feelings ensued from young love and romance that some critics found appealing to a young, teenage audience.

The electropop opening track, "Rum Pum Pum Pum", features samba percussion, pulsing bassline, and muted guitar riffs that Billboard described as "funky". Its lyrics compare the exciting yet also painful sensation of a first love to that of having a wisdom tooth, which is also reflected in its Korean title's literal meaning. "Shadow" is an alternative pop number with xylophone chimes and layered harmony vocals. It has eerie lyrics about a girl who stalks her "date" and descends into madness. The tracks "Kick" and "Toy" incorporate influences of EDM styles such as house, dubstep, and trap. Meanwhile, "Signal" draws from retro music styles of disco and acid pop.

Electronic and dance-pop are the styles of "Airplane" and "Step"; the former compares the feeling of falling in and out of love to a plane ride, and the latter incorporates house rhythms and saxophone melodies. "No More" is a retro-styled track with elements of old-school doo-wop and soul. The track was initially titled "Boyfriend Material" and intended for American singer Ariana Grande's 2013 album Yours Truly but it did not make the track list. The minimalist, acoustic guitar-based number "Goodbye Summer" features vocals from members Amber (who is also credited as a co-writer), Luna, and Krystal alongside featured vocals from D.O. The closing track, "Ending Page", is a groovy R&B number with rock beats.

== Release and promotion ==
On July 17, SM Entertainment announced that f(x) would return to the South Korean music market with their second full-length studio album, Pink Tape , on July 29, 2013, after a year of absence. That day SM uploaded a film onto their official YouTube account, which contained a behind-the-scenes video showing the photo shoot for the album's jacket and previewed the track "Shadow". On July 23, Pink Tape's track listing was confirmed, with a total of 12 tracks being featured on the album. The same day, the album's cover art and an album preview medley were revealed. Pink Tape was released on July 29, 2013, in digital and physical formats. On July 25, Mnet premiered the "Go! f(x)" special.

"Rum Pum Pum Pum" topped the Billboard K-pop Hot 100 chart, marking the group's first number-one single on the Billboard Korea charts.

== Reception ==
Professional ratings
Review scores
Source	Rating
IZM	3.5/5 stars
Tiny Mix Tapes	3.5/5 stars
Weiv	7.0/10

Pink Tape garnered widespread critical acclaim since its release and is often regarded as one of the best K-pop albums. Fuse introduced the record as "the most experimental K-pop album of the year" in their list of the 41 best albums of 2013, the only album by a K-pop artist on the list. In 2015, Bugs! included Pink Tape in their list of the 19 Best Girl Group Albums since 1995. In 2018, Pink Tape was ranked the 96th greatest Korean album of all time by 47 music and pop culture critics organized by The Hankyoreh and Melon—the only album by an idol group to make the ranking. Music critic Jeong Min-jae commended its production and stated that in the 20-year history of Korean idol music, there have not been many albums that have become such a clear touchstone.

Billboard hailed Pink Tape the greatest K-pop album of the 2010s, with Jeff Benjamin writing that it "proved the power of a full, sonically cohesive album, as a truly ambitious collection of experimental cuts"; showcasing "even the most mainstream of pop could be a place for advancing art and pushing creative boundaries. A cornerstone of the scene is represented here: Pink Tape represents K-pop as a fully conceptualized statement of music." The magazine also praised the album cover of Pink Tape as "inventive and playful," ranked it the 60th greatest album cover of all time. Cielo Perez from Paste ranked it the greatest K-pop album of all time—calling it "undoubtedly, the greatest K-pop album ever made", and praised its "beautiful amalgam of synth, dance and electro-pop" and experimentations with "bold, candy-colored electronica".

Pink Tape on critic lists
Publication	Year	List	Rank	Ref.
Billboard	2019	The 25 Greatest K-Pop Albums of the 2010s	1	
Bugs!	2015	19 best girl group albums (1995–2014)	Included	
EBS	2024	Top 100 Korean Albums (2004–2023)	Included	
Fuse	2013	The 41 Best Albums of 2013	22	
Melon	2018	Top 100 Korean Albums of All Time (2018 list)	96	
Music Y	2013	Top 10 Songs of 2013 (for "Airplane")	4	
Paste	2023	The 30 Greatest K-pop Albums of All Time	1	
Tonplein	2019	Best Korean Albums of the 2010s (ColoringCyan)	15	

== Accolades ==
Awards and nominations for Pink Tape
Ceremony	Year	Category	Result	Ref.
Golden Disc Awards	2014	Album Bonsang	Won	
Golden Disc Awards	2014	Album Daesang	Nominated	
Korean Music Awards	2014	Best Dance & Electronic Album	Nominated	
Red Dot Design Awards	2014	Best Communication Design	Won	

== Track listing ==
Pink Tape track listing
No.	Title	Lyrics	Music	Length
1.	"Rum Pum Pum Pum" (Korean: 첫 사랑니; RR: Cheot sarangni; lit. 'The first wisdom tooth')	Jun Gan-di	Erik Lewander; Iggy Strange Dahl; Ylva Anna Birgitta Dimberg; Anne Judith Wik	3:18
2.	"Shadow" (Korean: 미행 (그림자); RR: Mihaeng (geurimja); lit. 'Follow (shadow)')	Jun Gan-di	Sophie Michelle Ellis-Bextor; Cathy Dennis; Rob Fusari	3:30
3.	"Pretty Girl"	Misfit	Hyuk Shin; DK; 2xxx!; John Major; Chel Hill; Jasmine Kearse	3:06
4.	"Kick"	Kim Bo-min	Hitchhiker	3:38
5.	"Signal" (Korean: 시그널)	Kenzie	Kenzie	3:21
6.	"Step"	Jo Yoon-kyung	Artisans Music (Fingazz, Glen Choi); Aria Crescendo	3:36
7.	"Goodbye Summer" (f(Amber+Luna+Krystal); feat. D.O. of EXO-K)	Kim Young-hu	Amber Liu; Gen Neo (of NoizeBank)	3:11
8.	"Airplane"	Misfit	Martin Mulholland; Julia Fabrin; Tim Mcewan	3:34
9.	"Toy"	Seo Ji-eum	Herbert St. Clair Crichlow; Anne Judith Wik; Erik Lidbom	3:12
10.	"No More" (Korean: 여우 같은 내 친구; RR: Yeou gateun nae chingu; lit. 'My fox-like friend')	Dana	Alex Cantrall; Jeff Hoeppner; Dwight Watson	3:36
11.	"Snapshot"	Misfit	Vincent Stein; Konstantin Scherer; Michelle Leonard	2:50
12.	"Ending Page"	Hong Ji-yoo	Artisans Music (Fingazz, Glen Choi); Brodie Stewart	3:58
Total length:				38:05

== Charts ==
=== Weekly charts ===
Weekly chart performance for Pink Tape
Chart (2013)	Peak position
Japanese Albums (Oricon)	30
South Korean Albums (Gaon)	1
US Heatseekers Albums (Billboard)	21
US World Albums (Billboard)	1

=== Monthly charts ===
Monthly chart performance for Pink Tape
Chart (July 2013)	Peak position
South Korean Albums (Gaon)	4

=== Year-end charts ===
Year-end chart performance for Pink Tape
Chart (2013)	Position
South Korean Albums (Gaon)	28

== Release history ==
Release history and formats for Pink Tape
Country	Date	Format	Distributing label	Ref.
Various	July 29, 2013	Digital download	SM Entertainment	
South Korea	July 29, 2013	CD	SM Entertainment, KT Music	
Hong Kong	July 31, 2013	CD	Avex Hong Kong	
