= Red Light (f(x) album) =

Red Light
- Digital and "Wild Cats" version cover

Studio album by f(x)
- Released: July 7, 2014
- Recorded: 2014
- Studios: SM Studios, Seoul
- Genres: Synth-pop; electropop
- Length: 35:05
- Language: Korean
- Label: SM Entertainment
- Producers: Lee Soo-man; Casper & B.

F(x) chronology
Pink Tape (2013)	Red Light (2014)	4 Walls (2015)

Singles from Red Light
- 1. "Red Light" Released: July 3, 2014

Red Light is the third studio album by South Korean girl group f(x), released on July 7, 2014, by SM Entertainment and Genie Music. It reached number one on the Gaon Album Chart and had two promotional singles, "Red Light" and "Milk". This is the last album with Sulli, who left the group one year after its release.

== Background and release ==
Red Light has a dark and eerie concept, which f(x) said they liked. Krystal added that she liked this concept because she is often given roles that make her look pretty, and just this once she wanted something that would make her look darker and different.

Naver describes the album's title track, "Red Light", as a "blast of urban rhythm bit, reversal in electro house genre". The lyrics talk about capturing great moments, stopping and reconsidering what is important in life. Also, it is a message, using a "red light" to symbolize the warning, that is expressed in an eye-catching way. Jakob Dorof of Vice described the song as "a high-tech whiplash thriller with a chorus that hits like a fist and, by the second blow, has you begging for it." Kenzie, wrote the lyrics and Maegan Cottone of Phrased Differently, Daniel Ullmann, Bryan Jarett, Allison Kaplan and Sherry St. Germain were credited with the song's music. It was produced by Lee Soo-man and Casper & B. f(x) member Amber Liu describes the song's dance as the "most passionate" and "most dynamic". Luna said that the song's genre fitted with their aim for a slightly intense but feminine image.

The group played their first performance of the album's lead single, "Red Light", on July 3, 2014, through Mnet's M Countdown. The title track "Red Light" was played on Korean Broadcasting System's K-Pop Connection radio from July 8, 2014.

== Commercial performance ==
The Red Light album reached number one on the weekly Gaon Album Chart, while the promotional single "Red Light" went to number two on the Gaon Digital Chart and the Billboard K-pop Hot 100. Several other non-promotional album tracks also charted on the Gaon and K-pop Hot 100 charts. The record sold 86,143 copies in South Korea in 2014, the nineteenth best-selling album of the year.

== Critical reception ==
Fuse TV described f(x) as K-pop's top hipsters, and the album was acclaimed by critics. The "Red Light" music video reached more than 2 million views on YouTube on the first day of release. By August 2014, it had reached more than 10 million views. The song "Red Light" was chosen by Fuse TV as one of 15 nominees for 2014's summer anthem. The title track "Red Light" was included on the lists of best K-pop songs of 2014 by Dazed (number nine), Vice (number four), and PopMatters (number one).

=== Controversies ===
The South Korean broadcast station KBS ruled "Red Light" unfit for broadcast, since the song mentions a specific brand, the heavy equipment manufacturing company Caterpillar. In response, f(x)'s agency, SM Entertainment, modified the lyrics. Other TV stations, however, such as SBS's Inkigayo, MBC's Show Champion and Mnet's M Countdown, allowed broadcast of the song with its original lyrics.

== Accolades ==
Music program awards for "Red Light"
Program	Date
Show Champion	July 16, 2014
M Countdown	July 17, 2014
Music Bank	July 18, 2014
Show! Music Core	July 19, 2014
Inkigayo	July 20, 2014

== Sulli's hiatus ==
On July 17, f(x) performed on Mnet's M Countdown without Sulli. SM Entertainment explained that she was sick and thus unable to perform. However, when she did not appear in the next few Red Light promotions and f(x)'s Korean promotion schedule was abruptly cleared for the rest of the month, it led to speculation that Sulli would be leaving the group, or that the group itself would be disbanding. On July 24, SM Entertainment posted an official statement on the group's homepage, stating that Sulli had become "mentally and physically exhausted from the continuous, malicious comments and false rumors" that had been spread about her, and would take a temporary break from the entertainment industry, while remaining a member of f(x). The remaining members would move their activities to focus on solo ventures and continued overseas activities without Sulli for the time being. Sulli eventually withdrew from the group on August 8, 2015, making Red Light her final contribution.

== Track listing ==
Red Light track listing
No.	Title	Lyrics	Music	Length
1.	"Red Light"	Kenzie	Bryan Jarett; Daniel Ullmann; Maegan Cottone; Allison Kaplan; Sherry St. Germain; Casper & B.	3:32
2.	"Milk"	Kenzie	Lee Hyun-seung; Kenzie; Teddy Riley; Dom; Engelina Larsen	3:36
3.	"Butterfly" (나비; Nabi)	Shin Jin-hye (Jam Factory)	Thomas Troelsen; Engelina Larsen; Hitchhiker	2:57
4.	"Rainbow" (무지개; Mujigae)	Misfit	Will Simms; Ylva Dimberg	2:47
5.	"All Night"	Jinbo; Kim Lee-young (Jam Factory); Lee Eun-jin	Lee Hyun-seung; Teddy Riley; Dom; Jinbo; Ylva Dimberg	3:30
6.	"Vacance" (바캉스; Bakangseu)	Kenzie	Kenzie	3:15
7.	"Spit It Out" (뱉어내; Baeteonae)	Misfit	Caesar & Loui; Olof Lindskog; Jasmine Anderson	3:02
8.	"Boom Bang Boom"	Seo Ji-eum	Eirik Johansen; Jan Hallvard Larsen; Johan Gustafsson; Fredrik Häggstam; Sebastian Lundberg; Melanie Fontana	2:54
9.	"Dracula"	Jo Yoon-kyung	Joachim Vermeulen Windsant; Willem Laseroms; Maarten ten Hove	3:14
10.	"Summer Lover"	Young-hu Kim	Amber Liu; Sean Alexander	2:54
11.	"Paper Heart" (종이 심장; Jongi Simjang)	Seo Ji-eum	Chris Wahle; Didrik Thott; Dianna Corcoran	3:25
Total length:				35:05

== Credits and personnel ==
- f(x) – vocals
  - Victoria Song – vocals, backing vocals
  - Amber Liu – vocals, backing vocals, rap
  - Luna – main vocals, backing vocals
  - Sulli – vocals, backing vocals, rap
  - Krystal – lead vocals, backing vocals, rap
- Maegan Cottone – main vocals (demo version), music
- Kenzie – songwriting
- Lee Soo-man – producer
- Casper & B – producer, music
- Daniel Ullmann – music
- Bryan Jarett – music
- Allison Kaplan – music
- Sherry St. Germain – music

== Charts ==
=== Weekly charts ===
Weekly chart performance for Red Light
Chart (2014)	Peak position
South Korean Albums (Circle)	1
US Heatseekers Albums (Billboard)	13
US World Albums (Billboard)	2

=== Year-end charts ===
Year-end chart performance for Red Light
Chart (2014)	Position
South Korean Albums (Gaon)	19
