= Amber Liu (singer) =

American singer and rapper (born 1992)

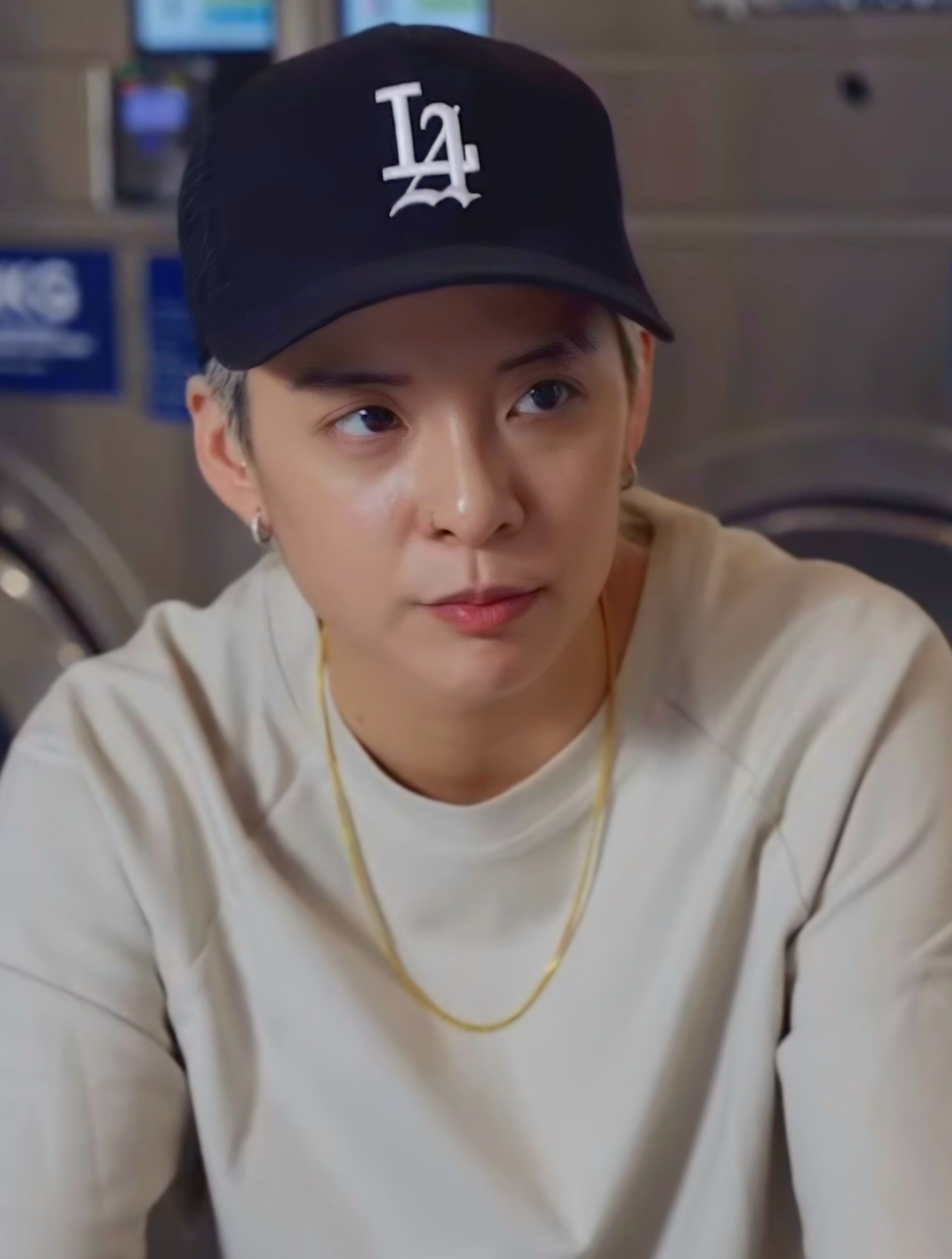
- Amber in March 2024
- Born: Amber Josephine Liu; September 18, 1992 (age 34); Los Angeles, California, U.S.
- Other name: Liu Yi-yun
- Occupations: Singer; rapper; songwriter
- Musical career
- Genres: K-pop; R&B; EDM
- Instrument: Vocals
- Years active: 2009–present
- Labels: SM; Steel Wool; UTA; Ryce
- Member of: f(x)
- Website: amberliuofficial.com

Chinese name
- Traditional Chinese: 劉逸雲
- Simplified Chinese: 刘逸云
- Hanyu Pinyin: Liú Yìyún
Transcriptions
Standard Mandarin
- Hanyu Pinyin: Liú Yìyún
- Bopomofo: ㄌㄧㄡ˙ㄧ˙ㄩㄣ˙
- Wade–Giles: Liu I-yun
- Tongyong Pinyin: Liú Yìyún
Wu
- Romanization: Leu^{上} Yih^{入}yuin^{上}
Yue: Cantonese
- Yale Romanization: Làuh Yahtwàhn
- Jyutping: Lau^{4} Jat^{6} Wan^{4}
Southern Min
- Hokkien POJ: Lâu E̍k-hûn

Korean name
- Hangul: 엠버
- RR: Embeo
- MR: Embŏ

Signature
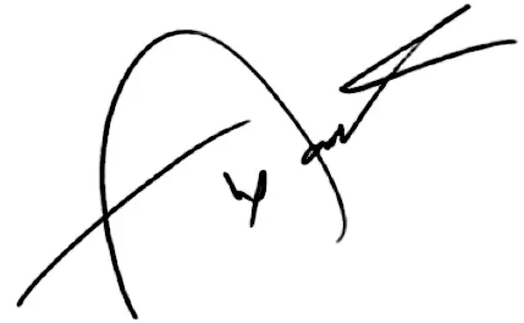

Amber Josephine Liu (born September 18, 1992), also known mononymously as Amber, is an American singer, rapper, and songwriter. She debuted as a member of the South Korean girl group f(x) in September 2009. In 2015, she became the first f(x) member to make a solo debut with the release of her first extended play Beautiful and has since released solo singles in Korean, English, and Mandarin.

In July 2018, she joined Steel Wool Entertainment following her original label SM Entertainment's joint partnership with Steel Wool to manage her American activities. In September 2019, she left SM and exclusively signed with Steel Wool prior to the release of her 2020 extended play X. In May 2021, she also signed with Ryce Entertainment for her activities in China following a successful stint as a mentor in survival show Produce Camp 2021.

== Life and career ==
=== 1992–2010: Early life and career beginnings ===
Liu was born on September 18, 1992, in Los Angeles, California. Her parents are from Taiwan and her father has Teochew ancestry. She has one older sister named Jackie. She attended El Camino Real High School in Los Angeles.

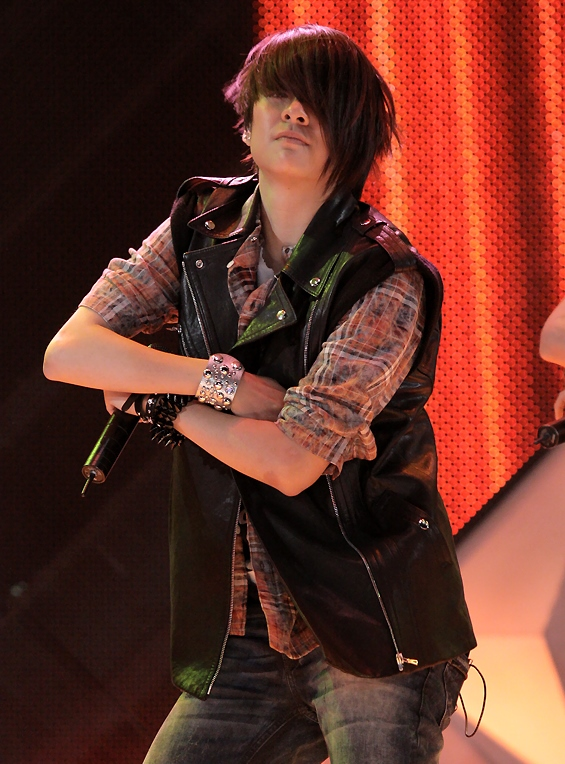
Liu in 2009

Liu excelled in SM Entertainment's Los Angeles global audition in 2008 where she and one male were selected to be trainees for SM Entertainment. After a year and a half of training, she debuted as a member of the South Korean girl group f(x) in September 2009. During an episode of the group's reality show, Go f(x), Liu revealed that her parents initially had mixed feelings regarding her music career. She stated: "My dad was very cautious, at first ...but then my mom was always supportive from the beginning. I really thank her and she also convinced my dad".

She has composed and written lyrics for some of the group's songs such as "Goodbye Summer" which was a single in their second studio album, Pink Tape, and "Summer Lover" from their third studio album, Red Light. Aside from featured songs, she also worked with fellow group mates Luna and Krystal for the soundtrack of KBS drama God of Study, in a song called "Spread its Wings".

She frequently collaborated with other SM Entertainment artists. Labelmate Yuri of Girls' Generation performed a cover of Ciara's song "1, 2 Step" at their first concert, Into the New World, held on December 19 and 20, 2009 in Seoul and featured her as a rapper and dancer. The song was then included in their first live album. In June 2010, she was featured in the lead single of Taiwanese singer Danson Tang's third Mandarin-language studio album, The First Second. She performed the Korean and English rap vocals and was also featured in the song's music video.

=== 2011–2014: Television roles ===
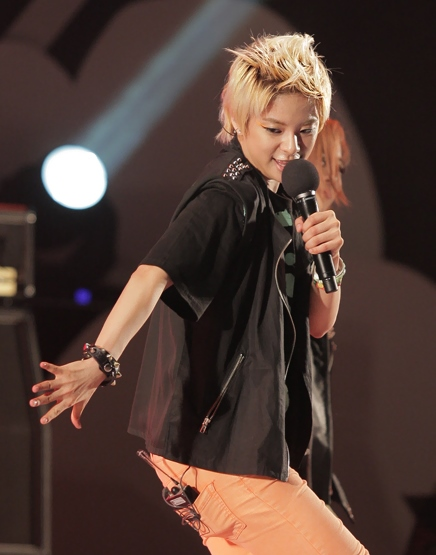
Liu performing at Seoul Plaza in 2011

Liu has also started a career on television. From October 2011 to April 2012, she was part of the reality show Invincible Youth. She had to leave the show to prepare for f(x)'s debut in Japan. In 2013, she was featured in the Korean version of the title track of Henry's's debut album, called "1-4-3 (I Love You)". She has hosted MBC's music show Show Champion with T-ara's Eunjung for a year, both of them stepped down as hosts on December 18, 2013. On June 6, 2014, she became a host of the KBS show, A Song for You with Kangin of Super Junior and Yook Sungjae of BTOB. She was also a host of We Got Married Global Edition. In the same year, she appeared in a 9-episode travel reality series, One Fine Day, with singer Ailee, who is a close friend of hers. The show, which aired on MBC Music, followed a vacation trip they took and was filmed on Jeju Island. On December 31, Liu was confirmed as a cast member for the second female soldier special of MBC's Real Men.

=== 2015–2019: Solo debut ===
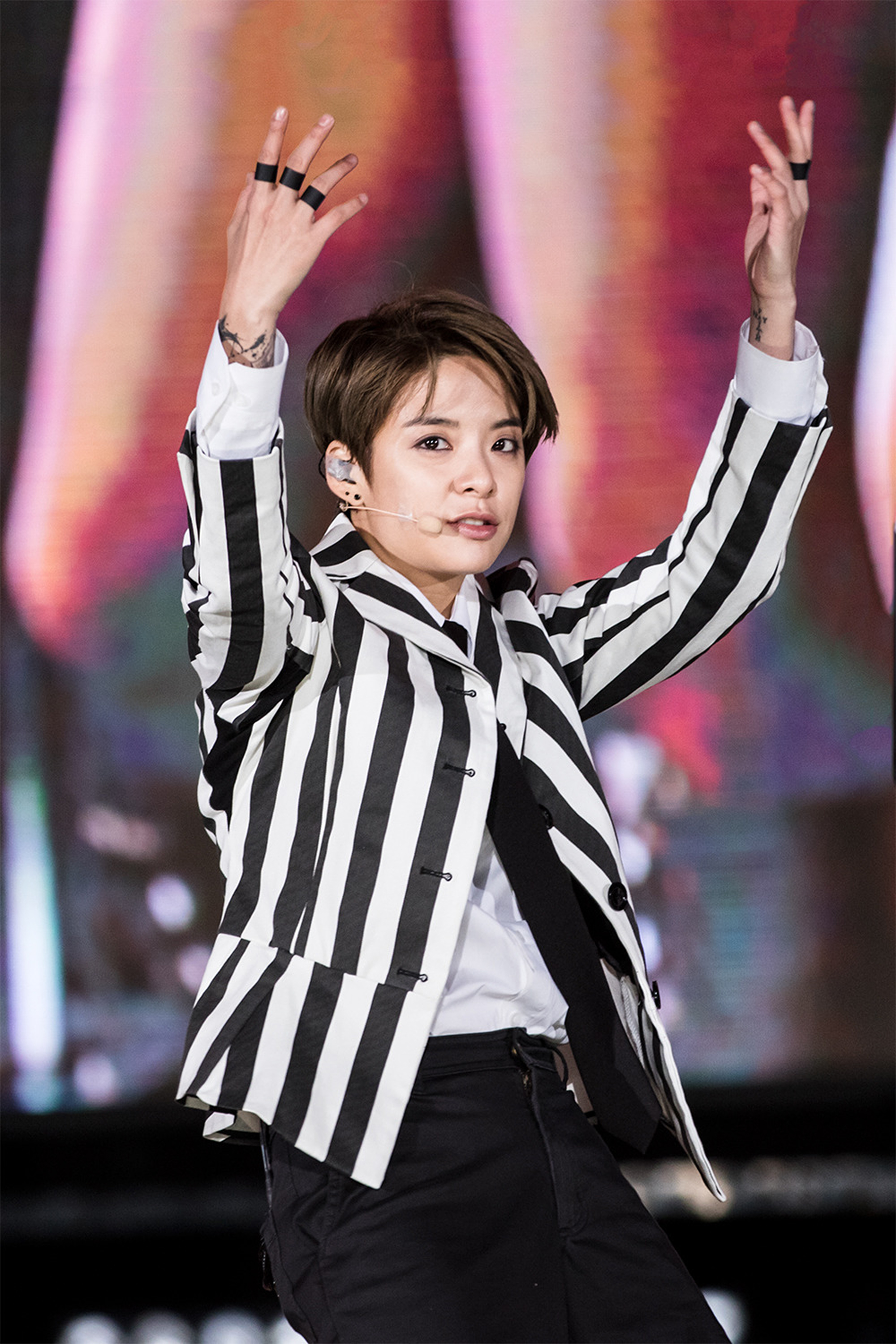
Liu at the Jeju K-Pop Festival in 2015.

Liu officially debuted as a solo artist, releasing her debut EP, Beautiful, on February 13, 2015. The title track, "Shake That Brass", featured Girls' Generation's Taeyeon. A few days prior to the release of the album, a lyric video for the B-side track, "Beautiful", was released. The music video contained childhood photos of the singer, as well as photos since her debut as a member of f(x). Its lyrics tells the story of the difficulties she faced as she chased after her dreams of being an entertainer and how she liked herself the way she is. Beautiful debuted at number two on Billboard's World Albums chart and number 19 on Heatseekers Albums. According to Jeff Benjamin of Billboard K-Town, this ranking shows Amber has a large international fanbase.

As a part of the SM Station project, Liu's solo single, "Borders", was released in March 2016. She participated in composing, lyrics writing and arrangement of the song. Written entirely in English, the hip hop track relates her childhood experiences and gives a message not to give up on oneself against life difficulties.

Liu released the digital single, "On My Own" on May 18, 2016. On May 25, she released another digital single titled "Need to Feel Needed". On September 9, 2016, SM Entertainment published the official music video for "Breathe Again". This was Liu's first entirely English song and her first collaboration with Japanese DJ, Ksuke. On April 15, 2018, Liu released her first English-language solo mixtape, Rogue Rouge, with six songs, free on SoundCloud. She also released a music video for one track, "Closed Doors", on YouTube, with plans to release a total of six videos.

In July 2018, she signed with Steel Wool Entertainment and was also registered by her real name. The agency represents and promotes her in the United States through singing, acting, as well as directing videos. Liu is also signed with United Talent Agency to represent her worldwide activities. In September 2018, Liu released a single album White Noise + Lost At Sea, which includes two songs "White Noise" and "Lost At Sea".

On September 1, 2019, Liu announced her departure from SM Entertainment. Five days later, she confirmed that she would continue forward with her Steel Wool Entertainment contract, and would release an album that she previously prepared with the label. On September 12, Liu announced that she was releasing her second EP, X, with six tracks. It was later confirmed that she would drop one track each month until the album's release on January 10, 2020.

=== 2020–present: Post-SM career and activities in China ===
On January 28, 2021, Liu was confirmed to be a mentor on the fourth season of the Chinese version of Produce 101, titled Produce Camp 2021, which ran from February until April 2021 and formed the boy group INTO1. On April 5, 2021, Liu announced her third extended play, y?. Soon after on April 8, 2021, Liu released two versions of her song "Neon": a Mandarin version that featured Chinese hip-hop artist Blow Fever, and an English version featuring Peniel from BtoB with two accompanying music videos that she co-directed. On April 29, 2021, Liu released two more singles from her album y?: the Mandarin version of "blue" featuring MaSiWei from Higher Brothers, and an English song called "Vegas"; along with music videos for each. On May 27, Liu and Steel Wool signed a partnership with Ryce Entertainment for her solo activities in China.

On September 21, 2021, Liu announced her fourth extended play Z!, with the first single "Paradise" being released on September 24, and the second single "Bad Decisions" being released on October 29. It was released on February 25, 2022.

== Discography ==
=== EPs and mixtapes ===
List of extended plays, with selected details, chart positions, and sales
Title	Album details	Peak chart positions			Sales
Title	Album details	KOR	US Heat	US World	Sales
Beautiful	Released: February 16, 2015; Label: SM Entertainment; Formats: CD, digital download	2	19	2	KOR: 16,194
Rogue Rouge	Released: April 15, 2018; Label: Team Pineapple; Format: Digital download; Track listing: 1. "Get Over It"; 2. "Closed Doors"; 3. "High Hopes"; 4. "Right Now" (feat. Gen Neo); 5. "Lifeline"; 6. "Three Million Years"	—	—	—	—N/a
X	Released: January 17, 2020; Label: Steel Wool Entertainment; Format: Digital download; Track listing: 1. "Hands Behind My Back"; 2. "Other People"; 3. "Curiosity"; 4. "Numb"; 5. "Ready For the Ride"; 6. "Stay Calm"	—	—	—	—N/a
y?	Released: May 7, 2021; Label: Steel Wool Entertainment; Format: Digital download; Track listing: 1. "Neon" (feat. Peniel); 2. "Make It Better"; 3. "Blue" (feat. Junoflo); 4. "Vegas"; 5. "Complicated"; 6. "Neon" (feat. Blow Fever) (Mandarin Version); 7. "Blue" (feat. MaSiWei) (Mandarin Version); 8. "Complicated" (Mandarin Version)	—	—	—	—N/a
Z!	Released: February 25, 2022; Label: Steel Wool Entertainment; Format: Digital download; Track listing: 1. "Paradise"; 2. "Bad Decisions"; 3. "Easier" (feat. Jackson Wang); 4. "Don't Dance"; 5. "I Love Somebody"; 6. "Done Thinking" (feat. Gen Neo, LXX); 7. "Lately"; 8. "Don't Dance" (Mandarin Version); 9. "Done Thinking" (Mandarin Version) (feat. Gen Neo, Psy.P)	—	—	—	—N/a
"—" denotes releases that did not chart or were not released in that region.

=== Singles ===
Title	Year	Peak chart positions		Sales	Album Title
Title	Year	KOR	US World	Sales	Album Title
Korean
"Shake That Brass" (featuring Taeyeon)	2015	17	4	KOR: 112,504+ (DL)	Beautiful
"Heartbeat" (with Luna featuring Ferry Corsten & Kago Pengchi)	2016	—	6	—N/a	SM Station Season 1
"Wave" (with Luna featuring R3hab & XaviGi)	2016	—	5	—N/a	SM Station Season 1
English
"Borders"	2016	205	—	—N/a	SM Station Season 1
"On My Own" (featuring Gen Neo)	2016	—	11	—N/a	Non-album singles
"Need to Feel Needed"	2016	300	—	—N/a	Non-album singles
"Breathe Again" (featuring Ksuke)	2016	—	—	—N/a	Non-album singles
"White Noise"	2018	—	—	—N/a	White Noise + Lost At Sea
"Countdown" (featuring LDN Noise)	2018	—	—	—N/a	Countdown + Beautiful
"Hands Behind My Back"	2019	—	—	—N/a	X
"Other People"	2019	—	—	—N/a	X
"Curiosity"	2019	—	—	—N/a	X
"Numb"	2019	—	—	—N/a	X
"Ready for the Ride"	2019	—	—	—N/a	X
"Stay Calm"	2019	—	—	—N/a	X
"Neon" (featuring Peniel)	2021	—	—	—N/a	y?
"Vegas"	2021	—	—	—N/a	y?
"Complicated"	2021	—	—	—N/a	y?
"Make It Better"	2021	—	—	—N/a	y?
"Paradise"	2021	—	—	—N/a	Z!
"Don't Dance"	2021	—	—	—N/a	Z!
"Bad Decisions"	2021	—	—	—N/a	Z!
Mandarin
"Curiosity" (Mandarin Version)	2019	—	—	—N/a	X
"Neon" (Mandarin Version) (featuring Blow Fever)	2021	—	_	—N/a	y?
"Blue" (Mandarin Version) (featuring MaSiWei)	2021	—	—	—N/a	y?
"Paradise" (Mandarin Version)	2021	—	—	—N/a	Non-album single
"Don't Dance" (Mandarin Version)	2021	—	—	—N/a	Z!
"—" denotes releases that did not chart or were not released in that region.

=== Other charted songs ===
Title	Year	Peak chart positions	Album
Title	Year	KOR	Album
"Beautiful"	2015	87	Beautiful
"I Just Wanna" (featuring Eric Nam)	2015	63	Beautiful

=== Collaborations ===
Year	Album	Song	Artist
2010	KBS God of Study OST	"Spread Its Wings"	With Luna & Krystal
2010	The First Second	"I'm Back"	Duet with Danson Tang
2010	The 1st Asia Tour Concert – Into the New World	"1, 2 Step [Live]"	Duet with Kwon Yuri
2012	The New Beginning	"Dance (Nanana)"	Featuring for Stephanie
2013	1-4-3 (I Love You)	"1-4-3 (I Love You)"	Duet with Henry
2014	"So Good"	"So Good"	Featuring for Chad Future
2015	Vivid	"Letting Go"	Duet with Ailee
2015	"We Own The World"	"We Own The World"	Featuring with Luna for Justin Oh (for Ultra Korea)
2015	Two Yoo Project – Sugar Man Part.6	"Just a Love"	Duet with Luna
2015	Beautiful	"SHAKE THAT BRASS"	Amber featuring Taeyeon
2015	Beautiful	"I Just Wanna"	Amber featuring Eric Nam
2016	"Breathe Again"	"Breathe Again"	Amber featuring Ksuke
2016	Heartbeat	"Heartbeat"	Amber with Kago Pengchi, Luna, Ferry Corsten
2016	Heartbeat	"Heartbeat- English Ver."	Amber with Kago Pengchi, Luna, Ferry Corsten
2016	Wave	"Wave"	Amber with R3hab, Luna
2016	Wave	"Wave- Xavi&Gi"	Amber with Xavi & Gi, Luna
2017	Future Friends	"Fantasy"	Featuring for Superfruit
2017	Love Don't Hurt	"Love Don't Hurt"	Featuring for Shannon
2018	"Lower"	"Lower"	Duet with Luna
2018	Rogue Rouge	"Right Now"	Amber featuring Gen Neo
2018	Places Like Home	"XL UBER"	Featuring for Justin Park
2018	The Light	"Perfect"	Featuring for James Lee
2019	Disorder	"Get Myself"	Featuring for Fyke
2020	Love Drunk	"Fix Me"	Featuring for Travis Artero
2020	Alright	"Alright"	Featuring for James Lee
2021	y?	"Neon" [mandarin version]	featuring Blow Fever
2021	y?	"Neon"	Featuring Peniel
2021	y?	"Blue" [mandarin version]	Featuring MaSiWei
2023	Beep Beep	"Get It? Got It? Good"	with Jessica Jung

=== As songwriter ===
Year	Album	Song	Artist	Notes
2012	Electric Shock	"Beautiful Stranger"	Amber, Luna & Krystal	Lyrics
2013	Pink Tape	"Goodbye Summer"	Amber, Luna, Krystal & D.O. of Exo	Music with Gen Neo
2014	Red Light	"Summer Lover"	f(x)	Music with Sean Alexander
2015	Beautiful	"Beautiful"	Amber	Music; Lyrics with Jam Factory
2015	Beautiful	"Shake That Brass"	Amber ft. Taeyeon of Girls' Generation	Music with Courtney Woolsey and Nermin Harambasic * Jin Choi; Lyrics with Rhymer, V-Hawk, Lee Yoo-jin, Kang Ji-eun
2015	Beautiful	"Love Run"	Amber	Music with Sean Alexander; Lyrics with Jakops and Kim Min-ji
2015	Beautiful	"Heights"	Amber	Music with Command Freaks; Lyrics with David Choi
2015	Beautiful	"I Just Wanna"	Amber ft. Eric Nam	Music with Gen Neo; Lyrics
2015	Vivid	"Letting go"	Ailee ft. Amber	Music and Lyrics with Ailee
2016	(single)	"Borders"	Amber	Music and Lyrics
2016	(single)	"On My Own"	Amber	Music and Lyrics
2016	(single)	"Need to Feel Needed"	Amber	Music and Lyrics
2016	(single)	"Breathe Again"	Amber	Music and Lyrics with Ksuke
2018	White Noise + Lost At Sea	"White Noise"	Amber	Music and Lyrics with Darren Smith and Sean Alexander
2018	White Noise + Lost At Sea	"Lost At Sea"	Amber	Music and Lyrics with Darren Smith and Sean Alexander
2020	Rogue Rogue	"Get Over It"	Amber	Music and Lyrics
2020	Rogue Rogue	"Closed Doors"	Amber	Music and Lyrics with Gen Neo
2020	Rogue Rogue	"High Hopes"	Amber	Music and Lyrics
2020	Rogue Rogue	"Right Now"	Amber ft. Gen Neo	Music and Lyrics with Gen Neo
2020	Rogue Rogue	"Lifeline"	Amber	Music and Lyrics
2020	Rogue Rogue	"Three Million Years"	Amber	Music and Lyrics
2021	y?	"neon"	Amber ft. Blow Fever	Music and Lyrics with Big Banana, Chu-Qiao Zhang and Peniel Shin
2021	y?	"blue"	Amber Ft. MaSiWei	Music and Lyrics with Big Banana, Da Yuen, Masiwei, Vintage Spaceship and Yun Yun Wang
2021	y?	"complicated - Mandarin Version"	Amber	Music and Lyrics with Big Banana, Da Yuan, Jon Um, Yun Yun Wang
2021	y?	"vegas"	Amber	Music and Lyrics with Alexandra, Jack, Jordan and Lilian
2021	y?	"make it better"	Amber	Music and Lyrics with Big Banana
2021	y?	"neon - English Version"	Amber ft. PENIEL of BTOB	Music and Lyrics with Big Banana and Peniel Shin
2021	y?	"blue"	Amber ft. Junoflo	Music and Lyrics with Big Banana, Junoflo and Vintage Spaceship
2021	y?	"complicated - English Version"	Amber	Music and Lyrics with Big Banana and Jon Um
2021	(single)	"No Fear"	YULTRON, Kellin Quinn and Amber	Music and Lyrics with Kellin Quinn and Yulton Lee
2022	Z!	"PARADISE"	Amber	Music and Lyrics with Amos Ang, Big Banana and Gen Neo
2022	Z!	"BAD DECISIONS"	Amber	Music and Lyrics with Ben Free and Two Fresh
2022	Z!	"EASIER"	Amber ft. Jackson Wang	Music and Lyrics with Chelsea Lena, Jackson Wang, Michael McGarity, Shaylen
2022	Z!	"DON'T DANCE"	Amber	Music and Lyrics with Amos Ang, Big Banana, Edward Shin, Gen Neo, Peter MSTR ROCKS Hong
2022	Z!	"I LOVE SOMEBODY"	Amber	Music and Lyrics with Enik Lin and Nasir Akmal
2022	Z!	"DONE THINKING"	Amber ft. Gen Neo & Psy.P	Music and Lyrics with Amos Ang, Gen Neo and Psy.P
2022	Z!	"LATELY"	Amber	Music and Lyrics with Sam Yun and Sean Alexander
2022	Z!	"PARADISE - English Version"	Amber	Music and Lyrics with Big Banana
2022	Z!	"DON'T DANCE - English Version"	Amber	Music and Lyrics with Amos Ang, Big Banana, Edward Shin, Peter MSTR ROCKS Hong
2022	Z!	"DONE THINKING"	Amber ft. Gen Neo & LXX	Music and Lyrics with Gen Neo and LXX

== Music videos ==
Year	Music video	Language	Notes
2015	"Shake That Brass"	Korean	
2015	"Beautiful"	Korean	
2016	"Borders"	English	Co-directed
2016	f(x) – "All Mine"	Korean	Directed
2016	Amber & Luna – "Wave"	Korean	
2016	"On My Own"	English version and Korean version	Directed
2016	"Need To Feel Needed"	English	Directed
2016	"Breathe Again"	English	
2016	Amber and Luna – "Heartbeat"	Korean	
2018	"Get Over It"	English	Co-directed
2018	"Closed Doors"	English	
2018	"High Hopes"	English	Produced
2018	"Right Now"	English	Directed
2018	"Lifeline"	English	
2018	"Three Million Years"	English	Directed and Produced
2018	"White Noise"	English	
2018	"Lost at Sea"	English	Produced
2018	"Countdown"	English	Directed
2018	Amber and Luna - "Lower"	English	Directed
2019	"Hands Behind My Back"	English	Directed
2019	"Other People"	English	Co-directed
2019	"Curiosity"	English and Mandarin	Directed
2019	"Numb"	English	Directed
2019	"Ready for the Ride"	English	Directed
2019	"Stay Calm"	English	Directed

== Filmography ==
=== Film and television ===
Year	Title	Role	Notes	Ref.
2016	Entourage	Joey Jung	Aired November 4, 2016 – December 24, 2016	
2020	The Eagle and the Albatross	Ji-min Kurt	Independent film	
2020	We Bare Bears: The Movie	Jojo Raccoon (voice)	Television film	
2020	I'll Ask the Stupid Questions	Herself	Television show on Ficto, Creator and Producer	

=== Reality TV ===
Year	Program	Notes
2011–12	Invincible Youth 2	Regular cast; Episodes 1–18
2013	Show Champion	Host
2014	We Got Married Global Edition	Host
2014	Ailee & Amber: One Fine Day	Season Regular
2014–15	A Song For You 3	Host
2015	Real Men	Cast
2015	Top Fly	Cast; Episodes 1–5
2015	A Song For You 4	Host
2016	We Got Married	Panelist
2021	Produce Camp 2021	Mentor

== Concert tours ==
Note- excluding f(x) tours

- Gone Rogue Tour (2018)
- Tour X (2020)

== Awards and nominations ==
Year	Award	Category	Nominated work	Result
2015	Mnet Asian Music Awards	Best Dance Performance	"Shake That Brass"	Nominated
2015	MBC Entertainment Awards	Best Female Newcomer Award	Real Men	Won
