= List of awards and nominations received by f(x) =

f(x) awards and nominations
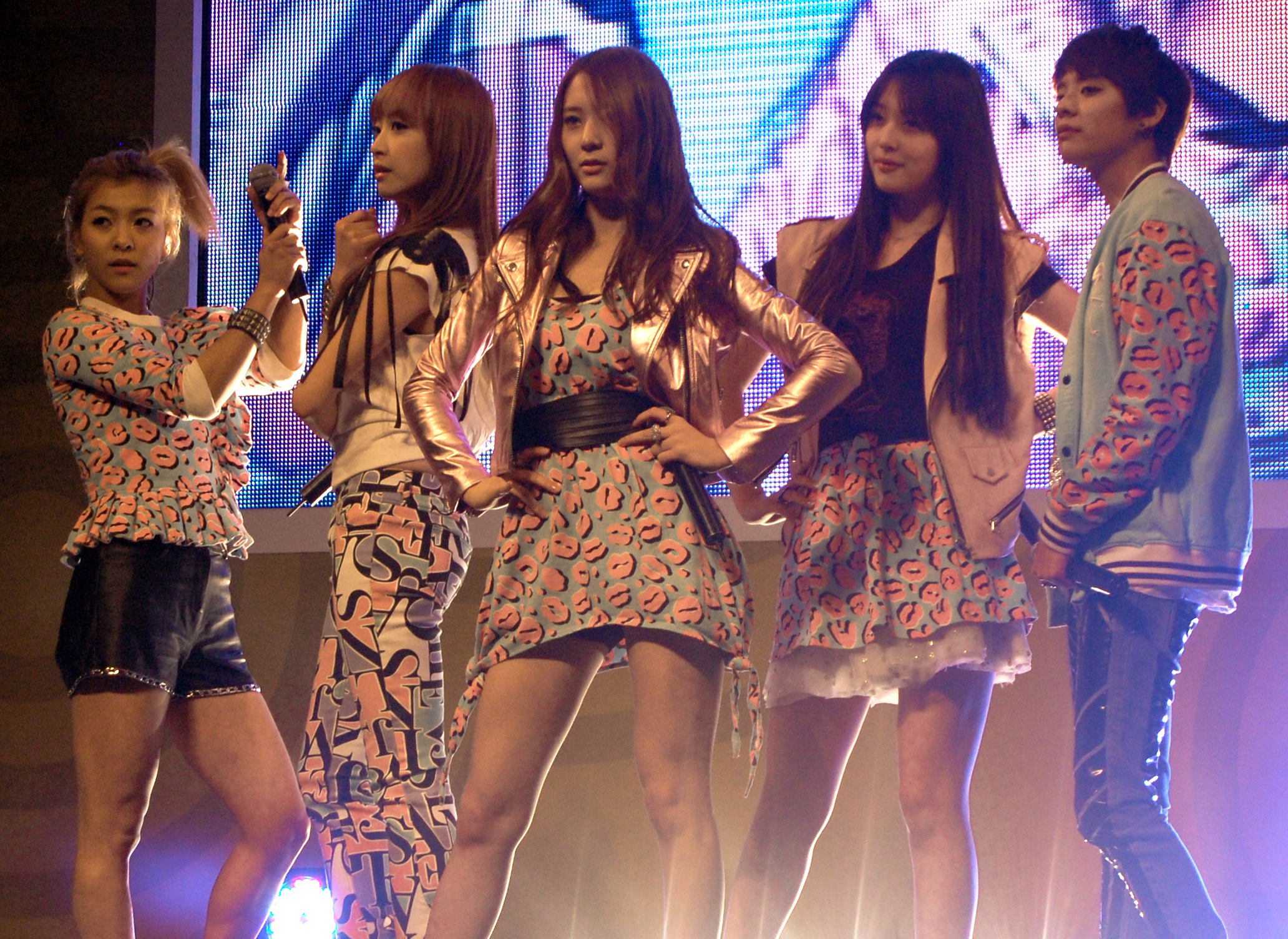
- f(x) performing in 2011
Awards and nominations
Award	Wins	Nominations
Bugs Music Awards	1	1
Cyworld Digital Music Awards	1	1
Golden Disc Awards	4	15
Huading Awards	1	1
iQiYi All-Star Carnival	1	1
Korea Best Dresser	1	1
Korea Lifestyle Awards	1	1
Korean Cultural Entertainment Awards	1	1
Korean Entertainment Arts Awards	3	3
Korean Music Awards	2	11
Melon Music Awards	2	5
Mnet 20's Choice Awards	2	3
Mnet Asian Music Awards	2	10
MTV Taiwan	1	1
Red Dot Design Award	2	2
Seoul Music Awards	1	7
Style Icon Asia	1	1
Top Chinese Music Awards	1	1
Other awards	3	3

Totals (Note: Certain award groups do not simply award one winner. They acknowledge several different recipients, have runners-up, and have third place. Since this is a specific recognition and is different from losing an award, runner-up mentions are considered wins in this award tally. For simplification and to avoid errors, each award in this list has been presumed to have had a prior nomination.)
- Wins: 28
- Nominations: 66

This is a list of awards and nominations received by South Korean girl group f(x) since their debut in 2009.

== Awards and nominations ==
Name of the award ceremony, year presented, award category, nominee(s) of the award, and the result of the nomination
Award ceremony	Year	Category	Nominee(s)/work(s)	Result	Ref.
Bugs Music Awards	2009	Rookie of the Year	f(x)	Won	
Cyworld Digital Music Awards	2009	Rookie of the Month (September)	f(x)	Won	
Golden Disc Awards	2009	Rookie of the Year	f(x)	Nominated	
Golden Disc Awards	2012	Disc Bonsang	Pinocchio	Won	
Golden Disc Awards	2012	Disc Daesang	Pinocchio	Nominated	
Golden Disc Awards	2012	Digital Bonsang	"Pinocchio (Danger)"	Nominated	
Golden Disc Awards	2012	Most Popular Artist Award	f(x)	Nominated	
Golden Disc Awards	2013	Disc Bonsang	Electric Shock	Nominated	
Golden Disc Awards	2013	Digital Bonsang	"Electric Shock"	Won	
Golden Disc Awards	2013	Digital Daesang	"Electric Shock"	Nominated	
Golden Disc Awards	2013	Most Popular Artist Award	f(x)	Nominated	
Golden Disc Awards	2014	Disc Bonsang	Pink Tape	Won	
Golden Disc Awards	2014	Disc Daesang	Pink Tape	Nominated	
Golden Disc Awards	2015	Disc Bonsang	Red Light	Nominated	
Golden Disc Awards	2016	Disc Bonsang	4 Walls	Won	
Golden Disc Awards	2016	Disc Daesang	4 Walls	Nominated	
Golden Disc Awards	2016	Digital Bonsang	"4 Walls"	Nominated	
Huading Awards	2016	Global Best Idol Group	f(x)	Won	
iQiYi All-Star Carnival	2015	Overseas Outstanding Stage Performance Award	f(x)	Won	
Korea Best Dresser	2010	Best Singer Dresser	f(x)	Won	
Korea Lifestyle Awards	2010	Style Icon of the Year	f(x)	Won	
Korean Cultural Entertainment Awards	2009	Newcomer Award	f(x)	Won	
Korean Entertainment Arts Awards	2010	Rookie Singer Awards	f(x)	Won	
Korean Entertainment Arts Awards	2013	Group Singer Award	f(x)	Won	
Korean Entertainment Arts Awards	2014	Group Singer Award	f(x)	Won	
Korean Music Awards	2011	Best Dance & Electronic Song	"Nu ABO"	Nominated	
Korean Music Awards	2011	Group/Musician of the Year Netizen Vote	f(x)	Won	
Korean Music Awards	2012	Best Dance & Electronic Song	"Pinocchio (Danger)"	Nominated	
Korean Music Awards	2012	Best Dance & Electronic Album	Pinocchio	Nominated	
Korean Music Awards	2013	Best Dance & Electronic Song	"Electric Shock"	Won	
Korean Music Awards	2013	Best Dance & Electronic Song	"Jet"	Nominated	
Korean Music Awards	2013	Best Dance & Electronic Album	Electric Shock	Nominated	
Korean Music Awards	2014	Best Dance & Electronic Song	"Rum Pum Pum Pum"	Nominated	
Korean Music Awards	2014	Best Dance & Electronic Album	Pink Tape	Nominated	
Korean Music Awards	2016	Best Dance & Electronic Song	"4 Walls"	Nominated	
Korean Music Awards	2016	Best Dance & Electronic Album	4 Walls	Nominated	
Melon Music Awards	2009	Best New Artist	f(x)	Nominated	
Melon Music Awards	2011	Popular Netizen Song	"Hot Summer"	Nominated	
Melon Music Awards	2011	Top 10 Artist Winners (Bonsang)	f(x)	Won	
Melon Music Awards	2013	Top 10 Artist Winners (Bonsang)	f(x)	Nominated	
Melon Music Awards	2013	MBC Music Star Award	f(x)	Won	
Mnet 20's Choice Awards	2011	Hot Blue Carpet Star	f(x)	Won	
Mnet 20's Choice Awards	2011	Hot Trend Musician	f(x)	Won	
Mnet 20's Choice Awards	2011	Hot Online Song	"Pinocchio (Danger)"	Nominated	
Mnet Asian Music Awards	2009	Best New Female Artists	"La Cha Ta"	Nominated	
Mnet Asian Music Awards	2011	Best Female Group	f(x)	Nominated	
Mnet Asian Music Awards	2011	Artist of the Year	f(x)	Nominated	
Mnet Asian Music Awards	2012	Best Dance Performance – Female Group	f(x)	Won	
Mnet Asian Music Awards	2012	Best Global Group – Female	f(x)	Nominated	
Mnet Asian Music Awards	2012	Song of the Year	"Electric Shock"	Nominated	
Mnet Asian Music Awards	2013	Best Female Group	f(x)	Nominated	
Mnet Asian Music Awards	2013	Artist of the Year	f(x)	Nominated	
Mnet Asian Music Awards	2015	Best Music Video	"4 Walls"	Nominated	
Mnet Asian Music Awards	2015	Global Choice Female Group	f(x)	Won	
MTV Taiwan	2011	Artist of the Month (June)	f(x)	Won	
Red Dot Design Award	2014	Communication Design Award Package	Electric Shock	Won	
Red Dot Design Award	2014	Communication Design Award Package	Pink Tape	Won	
Seoul Music Awards	2010	Newcomer award	f(x)	Nominated	
Seoul Music Awards	2013	Bonsang Award	Electric Shock	Won	
Seoul Music Awards	2015	Bonsang Award	Red Light	Nominated	
Seoul Music Awards	2015	Popularity Award	f(x)	Nominated	
Seoul Music Awards	2015	Hallyu Special Award	f(x)	Nominated	
Seoul Music Awards	2016	Bonsang Award	4 Walls	Nominated	
Seoul Music Awards	2016	Popularity Award	f(x)	Nominated	
Style Icon Asia	2016	Awesome Wannabe	f(x)	Won	
Top Chinese Music Awards	2014	Overseas Outstanding Stage Performance Award	f(x)	Won	
