= Layover (EP) =

EP by V
- Released: September 8, 2023
- Genres: Pop; R&B; jazz
- Length: 17:36
- Languages: English; Korean
- Label: Big Hit
- Producers: Frankie Scoca; Freekind; Jinsu Park; Absent Chronicles; Monro

Singles from Layover
- 1. "Love Me Again" Released: August 10, 2023; 2. "Rainy Days" Released: August 11, 2023; 3. "Slow Dancing" Released: September 8, 2023

Layover (stylized as Layo(v)er) is the debut extended play by South Korean singer V of BTS. It was released on September 8, 2023, by Big Hit Music. The record has been described as a pop, R&B and jazz EP "led by soulful tones of V's voice".

Layover comprises six songs, including a piano version of the track "Slow Dancing", all of which were accompanied by a music video. The videos for "Love Me Again" and "Rainy Days" were released ahead of the album's debut, while the video for "Slow Dancing" premiered alongside the EP on September 13.

According to Hanteo Chart, Layover sold over 1.67 million copies on its opening day, setting a new record for the highest first-day sales by any solo K-pop artist in chart history. It topped the component Download Albums chart and the component Digital Albums Chart. The EP debuted at number two on the Billboard Japan Hot Albums chart and on the corresponding issue of the Oricon Albums Chart. Layover debuted at number two on the Billboard 200 in the United States, with 100,000 equivalent album units earned in its first week, making V one of the highest-charting Korean solo artists in Billboard chart history, alongside his bandmates Jimin and Suga, at the time.

== Background and release ==
On August 2, 2023, it was reported that V started collaborating with NewJeans creative director Min Hee-jin for his upcoming studio project. Big Hit Music announced the EP on their social media on August 7. The post was accompanied by a visualizer that included the EP title and revealed the six tracks featured on the record. According to hints dropped by Big Hit, the album will largely focus on an "R&B sound" with "elements of pop". Song descriptions range from R&B ("Blue", "Love Me Again" and "For Us") to "'70s romantic soul style" on the focus track "Slow Dancing". All of the tracks are set to arrive with their own music video. In an accompanying press release, Big Hit stated that V is set to "showcase amazing new performances" and will make several appearances alongside the EP release. Upon the announcement, the singer mentioned that he wishes to "deliver" box sets of the EP to his fans with "lots of love".

== Music and lyrics ==
The EP opens with "Rainy Days", an alternative pop and R&B track. Abbie Aitken of Clash described it as a lo-fi mix founded on YouTube, writing, "the realism of the artificial rain, the soft jazz, and a curious phone alert swiftly followed by the sound of typing all add to a feeling of coziness and familiarity." The second track "Blue" is an old school R&B song that starts out with a simple guitar, then quickly transgresses into a combination of a drum and "gliding vocals." Third track, "Love Me Again" is another R&B song, revolves around discussing the feeling of missing loved ones and the struggles of letting them go after a heartbreak. Followed with "Slow Dancing", a 1970s romantic soul sound with a simple jazz rhythm. Its lyrics were described as a "typical love story" where "one lover pining over another singing words such as 'it shouldn't feel like this, hurts too much already." The closing track, "For Us" was picked as the most interesting track on the EP by Rhian Daly of NME, praising its production and "pitched-up vocal" writing, "its synth pads and bright piano immediately reminiscent of soft-focus '70s live performances."

== Critical reception ==
Professional ratings
Aggregate scores
Source	Rating
Metacritic	82/100
Review scores
Source	Rating
AllMusic	4/5 stars
Clash	8/10
Consequence	75/100
NME	4/5 stars

At Metacritic, which assigns a normalized score out of 100 to ratings from publications, Layover received an average score of 82 based on four reviews, indicating "universal acclaim".

Rhian Daly of NME wrote that "V's compatibility with his chosen palette makes magic, the record instantly oozing sophistication." while highlighting the tracks "For Us" and "Love Me Again". Consequence's Mary Siroky called the EP "a perfect addition to the autumn album canon, particularly for anyone else out there who loves to turn on a sad album and just yearn." Clash's Abbie Aitken said that Layover "truly showcase his personal identity, his natural being, and his unique tastes", while appreciating the cohesiveness of the EP.

Select year-end rankings of Layover
Publication/critic	List	Rank	Ref.
Billboard	The 25 Best K-Pop Albums of 2023	2	
Time Out	The 30 Best Albums of 2023	19	

== Promotion ==
On August 10, 2023, the official music video for the track "Love Me Again" was released. The official music video for the track "Rainy Days" was released the following day. The music video for the focus track "Slow Dancing" was released along with the EP on September 8. The music video for "Blue" was released on September 13. "For Us" was the last video released on September 15. V later promoted the EP on numerous music shows. On October 14, he held a fanmeeting titled Vicnic at the Outdoor Theater in Kyunghee University, Seoul, to promote the EP.

== Commercial performance ==
According to Hanteo Chart, one of the biggest music sales trackers in South Korea, Layover sold over 1.67 million copies on its opening day, setting a new record for the highest first-day sales by any solo K-pop artist in chart history. By the end of its first week, the sales of the EP tallied 2,101,974 copies, marking the first time that any solo artist's album surpassed the 2-million-sales milestone in its opening week. Layover earned the highest debut-week sales by a solo K-pop album, breaking the record previously set by bandmate Jimin with Face (1.45 million copies), and the 10th highest first week total among all Korean albums, making it the bestselling solo debut in South Korean history.

In Japan, Layover debuted at number two on the Billboard Japan Hot Albums chart issue dated September 13, 2023, with 238,057 physical copies and 6,773 digital copies sold during the period dated September 4–10. It was the best-selling digital album and second best-selling physical album of its release week on the component Download Albums and Top Album Sales charts respectively. Layover also debuted at number two on the corresponding issue of the Oricon Albums Chart, for the same tracking period, topping the component Digital Albums Chart as well.

Layover debuted at number two on the Billboard 200 in the United States, with 100,000 equivalent album units earned in its first week (ending September 14, 2023). This figure comprised 88,000 pure sales; 9,000 streaming equivalent albums (12.95 million on-demand official streams); and 3,000 track equivalent albums. With this, V tied with bandmates Jimin and Suga (Note: as Agust D) as the highest-charting Korean solo artists in Billboard chart history.

According to the International Federation of the Phonographic Industry's Global Music Report for 2023, Layover was the tenth best-selling album worldwide, having sold 2.2 million units. (Note: The IFPI Global Albums chart ranks, in order, the albums that generated the most money globally across streaming, download, and physical record sales (combined) in a calendar year. The Global Album Sales Chart measures global unit sales across all physical formats, as well as full album downloads.)

== Accolades ==
Awards and nominations for Layover
Year	Awards	Category	Result	Ref.
2023	MAMA Awards	Album of the Year	Nominated	
2023	Melon Music Awards	Millions Top 10 Artist	Nominated	
2024	Circle Chart Music Awards	Album (category)	Nominated	
2024	iHeartRadio Music Awards	Favorite Debut Album	Won	

== Track listing ==
Layover track listing
No.	Title	Lyrics	Music	Producer(s)	Length
1.	"Rainy Days"	Donghyun Kim; Freekind; Gigi; Masta Wu	Frankie Scoca; Freekind	Scoca	2:59
2.	"Blue"	Absent Chronicles; Catharina Stoltenberg; Henriette Motzfeldt; Jinsu Park	Gigi; Motzfeldt; Stoltenberg	Absent Chronicles; Park	2:29
3.	"Love Me Again"	Kim; Freekind; Gigi	Freekind; Park	Freekind; Park	3:02
4.	"Slow Dancing"	Freekind; Park	Kim; Freekind; Gigi	Freekind; Park	3:07
5.	"For Us"	Freekind	Freekind; Monro	Monro	2:51
6.	"Slow Dancing" (piano version)	Kim; Freekind; Gigi	Freekind; Park	Freekind; Park	3:08
Total length:					17:36

== Charts ==
=== Weekly charts ===
Weekly chart performance
Chart (2023)	Peak position
Austrian Albums (Ö3 Austria)	4
Belgian Albums (Ultratop Flanders)	7
Belgian Albums (Ultratop Wallonia)	5
Canadian Albums (Billboard)	39
Finnish Albums (Suomen virallinen lista)	19
French Albums (SNEP)	6
German Albums (Offizielle Top 100)	4
Hungarian Albums (MAHASZ)	17
Italian Albums (FIMI)	12
Japanese Albums (Oricon)	2
Japanese Combined Albums (Oricon)	2
Japanese Hot Albums (Billboard Japan)	2
Lithuanian Albums (AGATA)	6
New Zealand Albums (RMNZ)	3
Polish Albums (ZPAV)	2
Portuguese Albums (AFP)	2
South Korean Albums (Circle)	1
Spanish Albums (Promusicae)	41
Swedish Physical Albums (Sverigetopplistan)	4
Swiss Albums (Schweizer Hitparade)	6
UK Album Downloads (Official Charts)	1
US Billboard 200	2

=== Monthly charts ===
Monthly chart performance
Chart (2023)	Peak position
Japanese Albums (Oricon)	2
South Korean Albums (Circle)	1
South Korean Albums (Circle) Weverse Albums version	4

=== Year-end charts ===
Year-end chart performance
Chart (2023)	Position
Japanese Albums (Oricon)	16
Japanese Hot Albums (Billboard Japan)	18
South Korean Albums (Circle)	15

== Certifications and sales ==
Certifications and sales
Region	Certification	Certified units/sales
Japan (RIAJ)	Platinum	262,033
South Korea (KMCA)	Million	1,000,000^{^}
South Korea (KMCA) Weverse Albums version	2× Platinum	500,000^{^}
Summaries
Worldwide (IFPI)	—	2,200,000
^{^} Shipments figures based on certification alone.
