= List of M Countdown Chart winners (2011) =

Winners of South Korean music program M Countdown

M Countdown Chart winners (2011)

The M Countdown Chart is a record chart on the South Korean Mnet television music program M Countdown. Every week, the show awards the best-performing single on the chart in the country during its live broadcast.

In 2011, 29 singles ranked number one on the chart and 24 music acts were awarded first-place trophies. Seven songs collected trophies for three weeks and achieved a triple crown: "Tonight" by Big Bang, "Intuition" by CNBLUE, "Pinocchio (Danger)" by f(x), "Fiction" by Beast, "Mr. Simple" by Super Junior, "The Boys" by Girls' Generation, and "Trouble Maker" by Trouble Maker. No release for the year earned a perfect score, but "Intuition" by CNBLUE acquired the highest point total on the April 7 broadcast with a score of 9,654.

== Chart history ==
Key
	Triple Crown
	Highest score of the year
—	No show was held

Date	Artist	Song	Points	Ref.
January 6	GD & TOP	"High High"	951	
January 13	Secret	"Shy Boy"	847	
January 20	TVXQ	"Keep Your Head Down"	954	
January 27	Seungri	"V.V.I.P"	963	
February 3	Seungri	"What Can I Do"	—N/a	
February 10	Seungri	"What Can I Do"	943	
February 17	G.NA	"Black & White"	941	
February 24	G.NA	"Black & White"	907	
March 3	BigBang	"Tonight"	952	
March 10	BigBang	"Tonight"	9,090	
March 17	BigBang	"Tonight"	9,171	
March 24	Wheesung	"Heart Aching Story"	8,999	
March 31	CNBLUE	"Intuition"	9,255	
April 7	CNBLUE	"Intuition"	9,654	
April 14	CNBLUE	"Intuition"	8,901	
April 21	4Minute	"Mirror Mirror"	9,117	
April 28	BigBang	"Love Song"	8,901	
May 5	f(x)	"Pinocchio (Danger)"	8,845	
May 12	f(x)	"Pinocchio (Danger)"	8,675	
May 19	f(x)	"Pinocchio (Danger)"	8,301	
May 26	Beast	"Fiction"	9,136	
June 2	Beast	"Fiction"	9,253	
June 9	Beast	"Fiction"	9,191	
June 16	Kim Hyun-joong	"Break Down"	8,078	
June 23	Kim Hyun-joong	"Break Down"	8,561	
June 30	f(x)	"Hot Summer"	8,919	
July 7	2PM	"Hands Up"	—N/a	
July 14	T-ara	"Roly-Poly"	9,130	
July 21	T-ara	"Roly-Poly"	8,864	
July 28	Miss A	"Good-bye Baby"	8,616	
August 4	2NE1	"Ugly"	8,946	
August 11	Super Junior	"Mr. Simple"	9,036	
August 18	Super Junior	"Mr. Simple"	9,155	
August 25	Super Junior	"Mr. Simple"	8,540	
September 1	Infinite	"Be Mine"	8,775	
September 8	Infinite	"Be Mine"	8,241	
September 15	Kara	"Step"	9,016	
September 22	Kara	"Step"	9,314	
September 29	Huh Gak	"Hello"	8,746	
October 6	Brown Eyed Girls	"Sixth Sense"	—N/a	
October 13	Infinite	"Paradise"	9,072	
October 20	Brown Eyed Girls	"Sixth Sense"	7,674	
October 27	Girls' Generation	"The Boys"	9,180	
November 3	Girls' Generation	"The Boys"	—N/a	
November 11	Girls' Generation	"The Boys"	8,805	
November 17	Wonder Girls	"Be My Baby"	9,290	
November 24	Wonder Girls	"Be My Baby"	—N/a	
December 1	T-ara	"Cry Cry"	—N/a	
December 8	T-ara	"Cry Cry"	8,757	
December 15	Trouble Maker	"Trouble Maker"	9,167	
December 22	Trouble Maker	"Trouble Maker"	9,043	
December 29	Trouble Maker	"Trouble Maker"	8,972	
