= List of M Countdown Chart winners (2023) =

Winners of South Korean music program M Countdown

M Countdown Chart winners (2023)

The M Countdown Chart is a record chart on the South Korean Mnet television music program M Countdown. Every week, the show awards the best-performing single on the chart in the country during its live broadcast.

In 2023, 25 singles ranked number one on the chart and 17 music acts received first-place trophies. "Fighting" by Seventeen BSS received the highest score of the year, with 10,669 points, on the February 16 broadcast. Six songs have collected trophies for three weeks and achieved a Triple Crown: "Fighting" by Seventeen BSS, "Take Two" by BTS, "Seven" and "3D" by Jungkook, "Love Me Again" and "Slow Dancing" by V.

== Scoring system ==
Period covered	Chart system				
Period covered	Broadcast	Digital sales	Physical album	Video views	Voting
April 14, 2022 – December 28, 2023	10%	50%	15%	10%	25% (15% pre-vote + 10% live-vote)

== Chart history ==
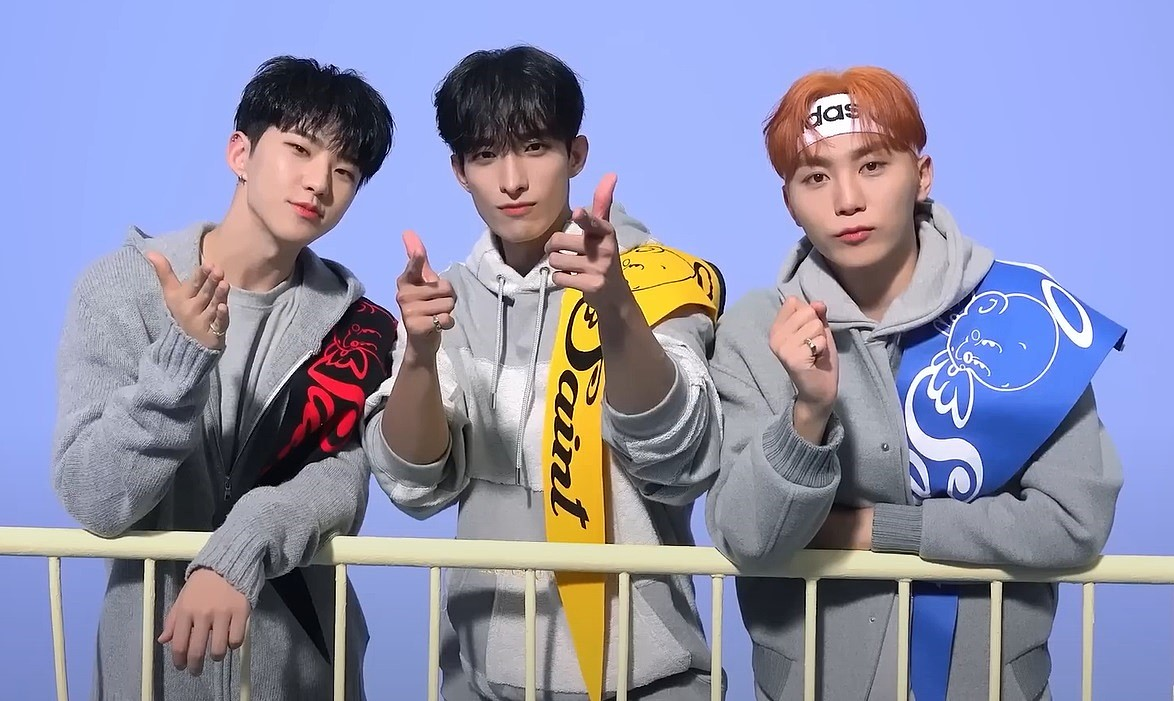
BSS (pictured) won their first M Countdown trophy and their first Triple Crown for "Fighting."

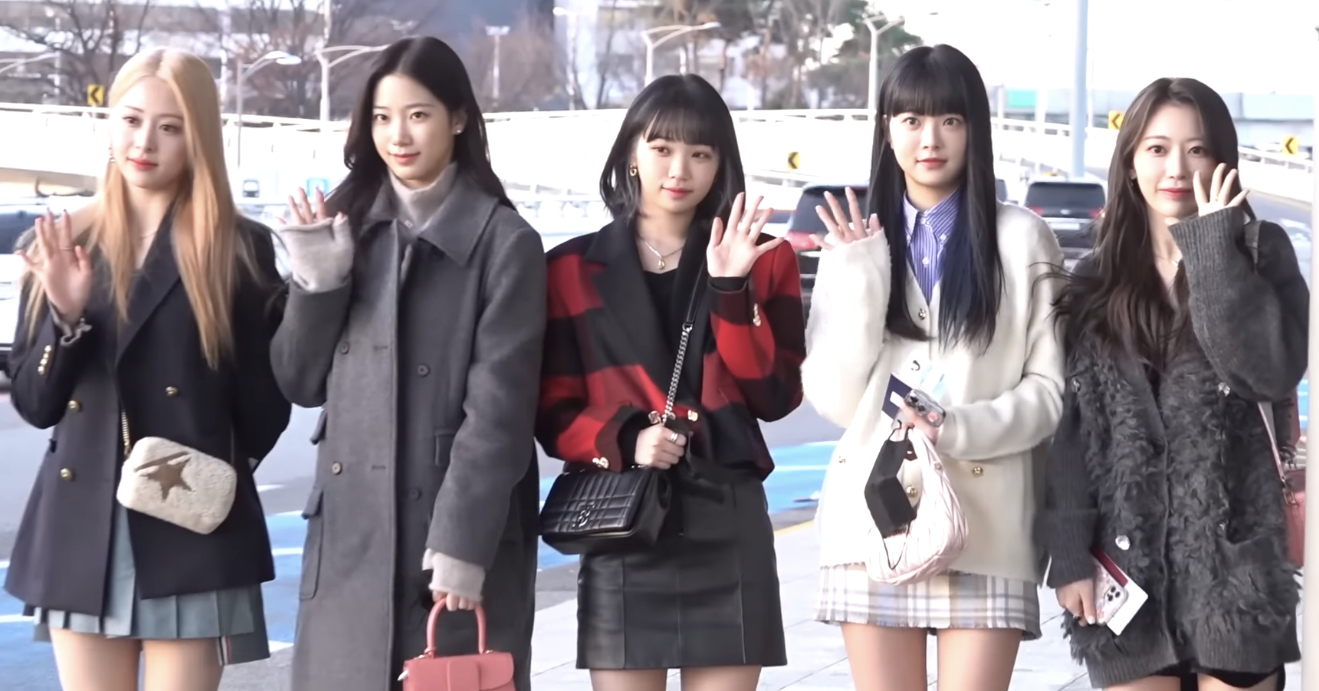
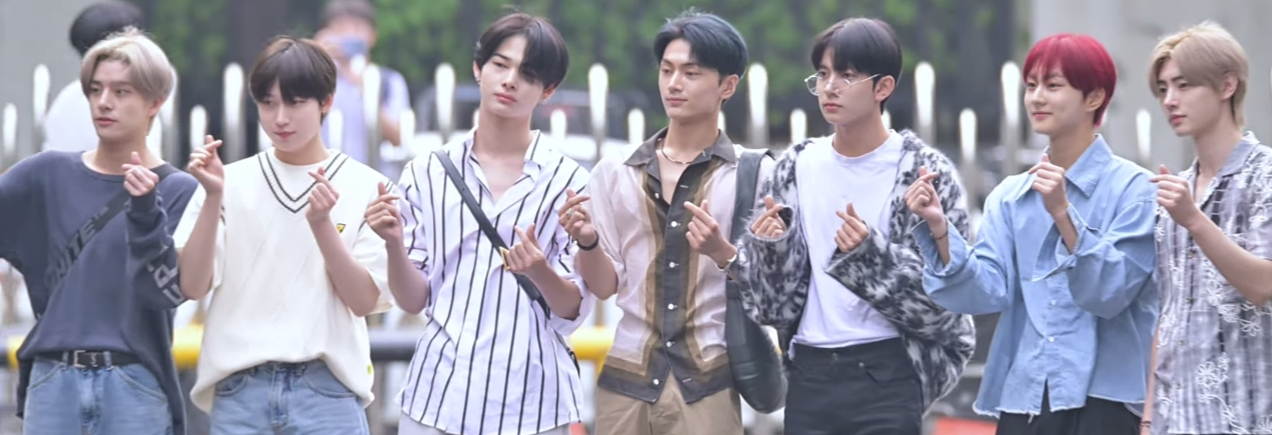
Le Sserafim (top), and Enhypen (bottom) won their first M Countdown trophy with "Unforgiven," and "Bite Me," respectively.
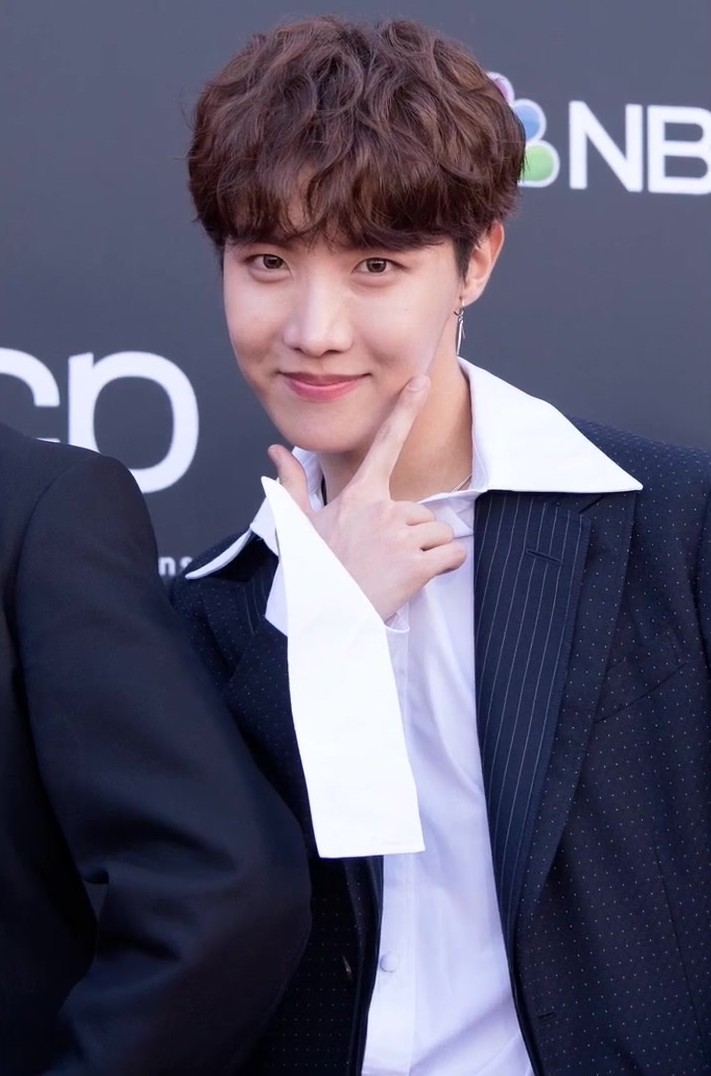
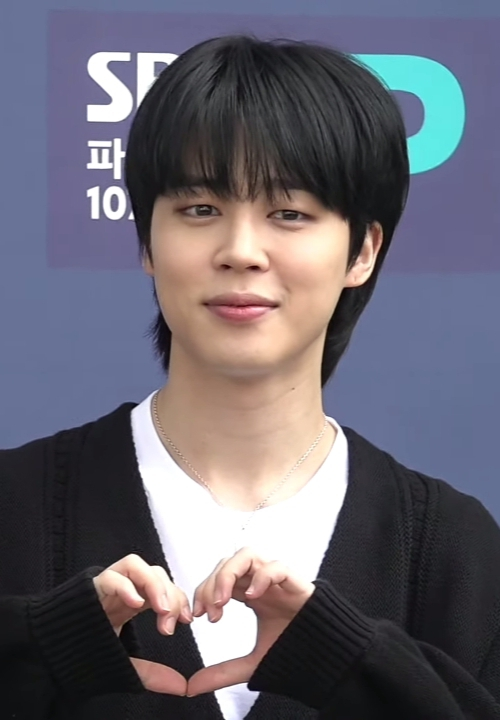
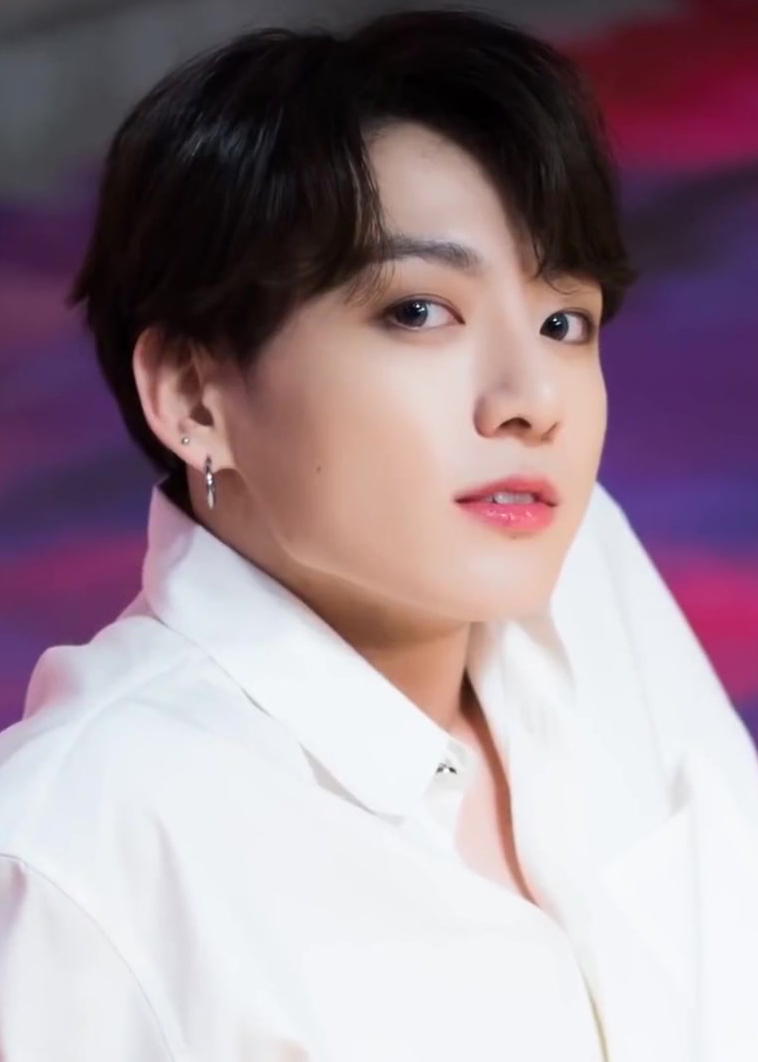
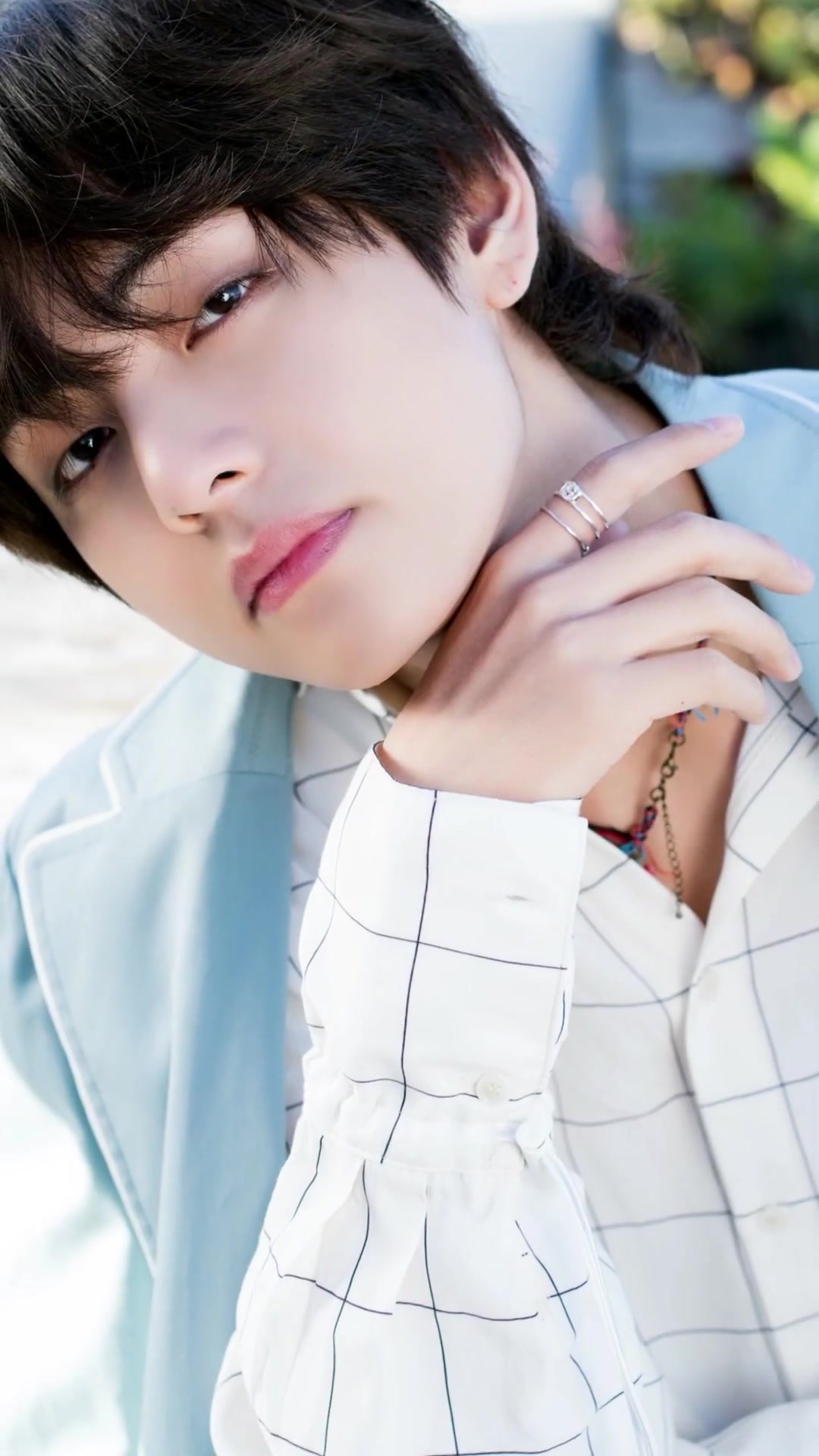
(From left to right) J-Hope, Jimin, Jungkook and V of BTS won their first music show trophy as solo artists with "On the Street", "Set Me Free Pt. 2", "Seven" and "Love Me Again".

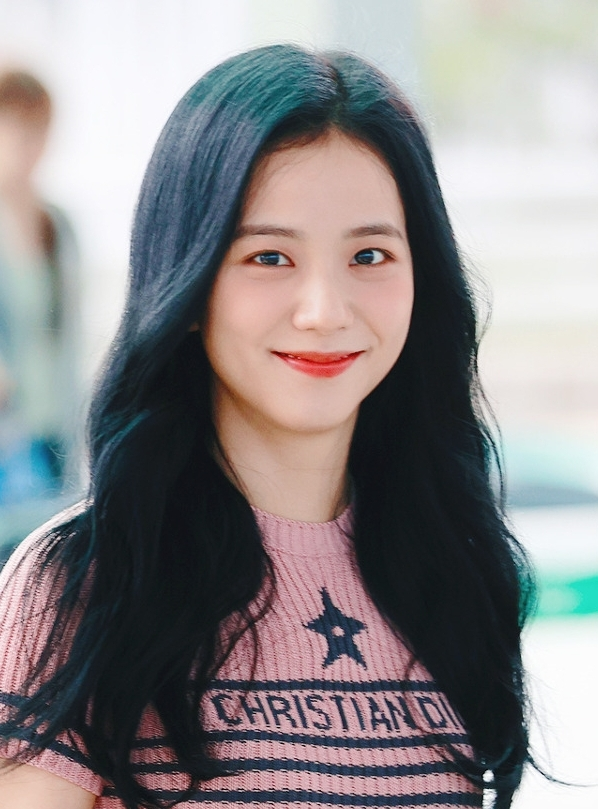
Blackpink's Jisoo (pictured) won her first M Countdown trophy as a soloist with her song "Flower".

Key
	Triple Crown
	Highest score of the year
—	No show was held

Episode	Date	Artist	Song	Points	Ref.
—	January 5	No Broadcast or Winner			
779	January 12	NewJeans	"OMG"	7,834	
780	January 19	Taeyang	"Vibe"	5,737	
781	January 26	NewJeans	"OMG"	—N/a	
782	February 2	TXT	"Sugar Rush Ride"	6,870	
783	February 9	TXT	"Sugar Rush Ride"	9,489	
784	February 16	BSS	"Fighting"	10,669	
785	February 23	BSS	"Fighting"	8,894	
786	March 2	BSS	"Fighting"	8,265	
787	March 9	J-Hope & J. Cole	"On the Street"	8,500	
788	March 16	J-Hope & J. Cole	"On the Street"	7,767	
789	March 23	Jimin	"Set Me Free Pt. 2"	8,414	
790	March 30	Jimin	"Like Crazy"	9,855	
791	April 6	Jimin	"Like Crazy"	—N/a	
792	April 13	Jisoo	"Flower"	8,890	
793	April 20	Ive	"I Am"	8,941	
794	April 27	Ive	"I Am"	7,139	
795	May 4	Seventeen	"Super"	9,603	
796	May 11	Le Sserafim	"Unforgiven"	8,575	
797	May 18	Aespa	"Spicy"	8,207	
798	May 25	(G)I-dle	"Queencard"	9,207	
799	June 1	Enhypen	"Bite Me"	8,813	
800	June 8	Stray Kids	"S-Class"	6,720	
801	June 15	Stray Kids	"S-Class"	—N/a	
802	June 22	BTS	"Take Two"	7,500	
803	June 29	BTS	"Take Two"	7,750	
804	July 6	BTS	"Take Two"	7,671	
805	July 13	NewJeans	"Super Shy"	5,848	
806	July 20	Jungkook	"Seven"	6,068	
807	July 27	Jungkook	"Seven"	7,606	
808	August 3	Jungkook	"Seven"	7,737	
809	August 10	NewJeans	"ETA"	6,136	
810	August 17	NewJeans	"ETA"	—N/a	
811	August 24	V	"Love Me Again"	7,864	
812	August 31	V	"Love Me Again"	7,751	
813	September 7	V	"Love Me Again"	7,618	
814	September 14	V	"Slow Dancing"	9,557	
815	September 21	V	"Slow Dancing"	9,096	
816	September 28	V	"Slow Dancing"	—N/a	
817	October 5	Jungkook	"3D"	—N/a	
818	October 12	Jungkook	"3D"	8,436	
819	October 19	Jungkook	"3D"	7,874	
820	October 26	Ive	"Baddie"	—N/a	
821	November 2	Seventeen	"God of Music	—N/a	
822	November 9	Jungkook	"Standing Next to You"	9,622	
823	November 16	Jungkook	"Standing Next to You"	8,237	
—N/a	November 23	No Broadcast or Winner			
—N/a	November 30	No Broadcast or Winner			
—N/a	December 7	No Broadcast or Winner			
—N/a	December 14	No Broadcast or Winner			
—N/a	December 21	No Broadcast or Winner			
—N/a	December 28	No Broadcast or Winner			

== See also ==
- List of Inkigayo Chart winners (2023)
- List of Music Bank Chart winners (2023)
- List of Show Champion Chart winners (2023)
- List of Show! Music Core Chart winners (2023)
- List of The Show Chart winners (2023)
