= Slow Dancing (V song) =

2023 single by V

- Remixes cover

Single by V

from the EP Layover
- Language: Korean
- Released: September 8, 2023
- Studio: Hybe Studio
- Genre: Soul
- Length: 3:07
- Label: Big Hit
- Songwriters: Donghyun Kim; Freekind; Gigi; Jinsu Park; Cautious Clay; Sam Gendel
- Producers: Freekind; Jinsu Park

V singles chronology
"Love Me Again" / "Rainy Days" (2023)	"Slow Dancing" (2023)	"Wherever U R" (2023)

Music video
- "Slow Dancing" on YouTube

"Slow Dancing" is a song recorded by South Korean singer V of BTS for his debut EP Layover. It was released by Big Hit Music on September 8, 2023, as the third single from the album. Produced by Jinsu Park and Freekind, who wrote the song alongside Donghyun Kim, Gigi, Cautious Clay, and Sam Gendel, "Slow Dancing" is a soul track driven by a simple jazz rhythm whose lyrics depict a "typical love story".

== Music and lyrics ==
A 1970s romantic soul song with a simple jazz rhythm, "Slow Dancing" was written by its producers Freekind and Jinsu Park, together with Donghyun Kim, Gigi, Cautious Clay, and Sam Gendel. Lyrically, V sings of a "typical love story", with "one lover pining over another singing words such as 'It shouldn't feel like this, hurts too much already."

== Accolades ==
"Slow Dancing" won six first place trophies—it achieved a triple crown on M Countdown—on domestic television music shows, and two consecutive Melon Popularity awards for the weeks ending September 18 and 25, 2023. It was nominated for and won Best Music – Fall at the Fact Music Awards in October.

Music program awards for "Slow Dancing"
Program	Date	Ref.
M Countdown	September 14, 2023	
M Countdown	September 21, 2023	
M Countdown	September 28, 2023	
Music Bank	September 15, 2023	
Music Bank	September 22, 2023	
Show Champion	September 20, 2023	

== Track listing ==
- Digital download and streaming (remixes)
1. "Slow Dancing" (FRNK remix) – 2:49
2. "Slow Dancing" (Cautious Clay remix) – 2:51

== Credits and personnel ==
- V – vocals
- Min Hee-jin – creative director, executive producer, vocal director
- Donghyun Kim – lyricist
- Gigi – lyricist
- Freekind – lyricist, composition, arrangement, Instrumentation, programmer, background vocals, record producer
- Jinsu Park – lyricist, composition, Instrumentation, programmer, record producer
- Cautious Clay – composition, arrangement, flute, background vocals
- Sam Gendel – composition, arrangement, saxophone
- Jang Jung Woo – vocal director, vocal editing
- MI.O – vocal director, vocal editing
- Son Yu Jeong – vocal editing, recording engineer
- Lee Pyeong Wook – recording engineer
- David Wrench – mixing engineer
- Dale Becker – mastering engineer

== Charts ==
=== Weekly charts ===
Weekly chart performance
Chart (2023)	Peak position
Australia New Music (ARIA)	19
Canada Hot 100 (Billboard)	60
Global 200 (Billboard)	4
Hong Kong (Billboard)	9
India International (IMI)	1
Indonesia (Billboard)	5
Japan (Japan Hot 100)	26
Japan Combined Singles (Oricon)	33
Malaysia (Billboard)	4
Malaysia International (RIM)	3
MENA (IFPI)	3
New Zealand (RMNZ)	38
North Africa (IFPI)	19
Peru (Billboard)	18
Philippines (Billboard)	4
Saudi Arabia (IFPI)	11
Singapore (RIAS)	2
South Korea (Circle)	24
Taiwan (Billboard)	5
UAE (IFPI)	12
UK Singles (Official Charts)	24
US Billboard Hot 100	51
Vietnam (Vietnam Hot 100)	2

=== Monthly charts ===
Monthly chart performance
Chart (2023)	Position
South Korea (Circle)	47

== Release history ==
Release dates and formats
Region	Date	Format(s)	Version	Label	Ref.
Various	September 8, 2023	CD single; digital download; streaming	Original; piano	Big Hit	
Various	October 23, 2023	Digital download; streaming	Remixes	Big Hit	
