= Rainy Days (song) =

2023 single by V

Single by V

from the EP Layover
- Language: English; Korean
- Released: August 11, 2023
- Genre: Alternative pop; R&B; lo-fi
- Length: 2:59
- Label: Big Hit
- Songwriters: Donghyun Kim; Frankie Scoca; Freekind; Gigi; Masta Wu
- Producer: Frankie Scoca

V singles chronology
| "Christmas Tree" (2021) | "Love Me Again" / "Rainy Days" (2023) | "Slow Dancing" (2023) |

Music video
- "Rainy Days" on YouTube

"Rainy Days" is a song recorded by South Korean singer V of BTS for his debut EP Layover. It was released on August 11, 2023, by Big Hit Music.

== Music and lyrics ==
"Rainy Days" is an alternative pop R&B track, written by its producer Frankie Scoca alongside Donghyun Kim, Freekind, Gigi and the South Korean rapper Masta Wu. In terms of musical notation, the song is written in the key of A minor, has a tempo of 75 beats per minute.

Abbie Aitken of Clash described the song as a lo-fi mix founded on YouTube, writing, "the realism of the artificial rain, the soft jazz, and a curious phone alert swiftly followed by the sound of typing all add to a feeling of cosiness and familiarity." As quoted from The Indian Express "the lyrics, they express the yearning to reunite with a beloved and stresses on the emotions associated with rainy days and the desire to mend things with someone special. The song includes lyrics like “Don’t tell me it’s over” and “We can start over”.

== Accolades ==
Select year-end rankings of "Rainy Days"
| Publication | List | Rank | Ref. |
|---|---|---|---|
| Rolling Stone | The 100 Best Songs of 2023 | 58 | |

== Credits and personnel ==
- V – vocals
- Gigi – lyricist
- Masta Wu – lyricist
- Kim Ximya – lyricist
- Min Hee Jin – creative director, executive producer, vocal director
- Jang Jung Woo – vocal director
- MI.O – vocal director
- Freekind – background vocals, lyricist, composer
- Frankie Scoca – composer, arrangement, record producer
- Choi Hye Jin – vocal editing
- Son Yu Jeong – recording engineer
- Lee Pyeong Wook – recording engineer
- David Wrench – mixing engineer
- Dale Becker – mastering engineer

== Charts ==
=== Weekly charts ===
Weekly chart performance for "Rainy Days"
| Chart (2023) | Peak position |
|---|---|
| Canada Digital Song Sales (Billboard) | 12 |
| Global 200 (Billboard) | 16 |
| India International (IMI) | 3 |
| Indonesia (Billboard) | 17 |
| Japan (Japan Hot 100) | 91 |
| Japan Heatseekers (Billboard) | 6 |
| Japan Digital Singles (Oricon) | 5 |
| Malaysia (Billboard) | 19 |
| Malaysia International (RIM) | 14 |
| MENA (IFPI) | 9 |
| Netherlands (Global Top 40) | 38 |
| New Zealand Hot Singles (RMNZ) | 7 |
| Philippines (Billboard) | 20 |
| Singapore (RIAS) | 12 |
| South Korea (Circle) | 56 |
| UK Indie (Official Charts) | 42 |
| UK Singles Downloads (Official Charts) | 6 |
| UK Singles Sales (OCC) | 6 |
| US Bubbling Under Hot 100 (Billboard) | 18 |
| US Digital Song Sales (Billboard) | 4 |
| Vietnam (Vietnam Hot 100) | 4 |

=== Monthly charts ===
Monthly chart performance for "Rainy Days"
| Chart (2023) | Position |
|---|---|
| South Korea (Circle) | 81 |
