= List of M Countdown Chart winners (2012) =

List of M Countdown Chart winners

M Countdown Chart winners (2012)

The M Countdown Chart is a record chart on the South Korean Mnet television music program M Countdown. Every week, the show awards the best-performing single on the chart in the country during its live broadcast.

In 2012, 28 singles ranked number one on the chart and 26 music acts were awarded first-place trophies. Nine songs collected trophies for three weeks and achieved a triple crown: "Twinkle" by Girls' Generation-TTS, "The Chaser" by Infinite, "Electric Shock" by f(x), "Sexy, Free & Single" by Super Junior, "Beautiful Night" by Beast, "Gangnam Style" by Psy, "Crayon" by G-Dragon, "1,2,3,4" by Lee Hi, and "Return" by Lee Seung-gi. No release for the year earned a perfect score, but "Twinkle" by Girls' Generation-TTS acquired the highest point total on the May 10 broadcast with a score of 9,357.

== Scoring system ==
=== 22 December 2011 – 23 August 2012 ===
Digital Single Sales 45%, Album Sales 10%, Global Fan Vote 15%, Mnet Broadcasting 5%, Preferences of Music Experts 10%, Real-Time Charts 5%, SMS Vote 10%.

=== 30 August 2012 – 20 February 2014 ===
Digital Single Sales 50%, Album Sales 10%, Age Preference 20%, Global Fan Vote 5%, Live Show Preferences 10%, SMS Vote 5%.

== Chart history ==
Key
	Triple Crown
	Highest score of the year
—	No show was held

Date	Artist	Song	Points	Ref.
January 5	Apink	"My My"	8,224	
January 12	T-ara	"Lovey-Dovey"	8,097	
January 19	T-ara	"Lovey-Dovey"	8,588	
January 26	MBLAQ	"This Is War"	8,865	
February 2	MBLAQ	"This Is War"	8,869	
February 9	F.T. Island	"Severely"	8,637	
February 16	Seven	"When I Can't Sing"	8,876	
February 23	F.T. Island	"Severely"	8,689	
March 1	Miss A	"Touch"	8,734	
March 8	BigBang	"Blue"	9,081	
March 15	BigBang	Fantastic Baby	9,096	
March 22	BigBang	Fantastic Baby	9,204	
March 29	Shinee	"Sherlock (Clue + Note)"	9,081	
April 5	CNBLUE	"Hey You"	8,864	
April 12	Busker Busker	"Cherry Blossom Ending"	8,577	
April 19	Shinhwa	"Venus"	8,810	
April 26	Sistar	"Alone"	8,182	
May 3	4Minute	"Volume Up"	8,105	
May 10	Girls' Generation-TTS	"Twinkle"	9,355	
May 17	Girls' Generation-TTS	"Twinkle"	9,357	
May 24	Girls' Generation-TTS	"Twinkle"	8,831	
May 31	Infinite	"The Chaser"	—N/a	
June 7	Infinite	"The Chaser"	8,703	
June 14	Infinite	"The Chaser"	8,422	
June 21	f(x)	"Electric Shock"	9,296	
June 28	f(x)	"Electric Shock"	—N/a	
July 5	f(x)	"Electric Shock"	8,940	
July 12	Super Junior	"Sexy, Free & Single"	8,837	
July 19	Super Junior	"Sexy, Free & Single"	8,658	
July 26	Super Junior	"Sexy, Free & Single"	8,432	
August 2	Beast	"Beautiful Night"	8,696	
August 9	Beast	"Beautiful Night"	8,876	
August 16	Beast	"Beautiful Night"	8,951	
August 23	Psy	"Gangnam Style"	8,423	
August 30	Psy	"Gangnam Style"	8,561	
September 6	Psy	"Gangnam Style"	8,637	
September 13	Kara	"Pandora"	8,515	
September 20	F.T. Island	"I Wish"	7,264	
September 27	G-Dragon	"Crayon"	8,924	
October 4	G-Dragon	"Crayon"	—N/a	
October 11	G-Dragon	"Crayon"	—N/a	
October 18	Gain	"Bloom"	7,533	
October 25	K.Will	"Please Don't..."	—N/a	
November 1	K.Will	"Please Don't..."	8,418	
November 8	Lee Hi	"1,2,3,4"	7,890	
November 15	Lee Hi	"1,2,3,4"	8,454	
November 22	Lee Hi	"1,2,3,4"	—N/a	
November 29	Lee Seung-gi	"Return"	—N/a	
December 6	Lee Seung-gi	"Return"	—N/a	
December 13	Lee Seung-gi	"Return"	8,593	
December 20	Yang Yo-seob	"Caffeine"	9,267	
December 27	Yang Yo-seob	"Caffeine"	—N/a	
