= List of M Countdown Chart winners (2014) =

Winners of South Korean music program M Countdown

M Countdown Chart winners (2014)

The M Countdown Chart is a record chart on the South Korean Mnet television music program M Countdown. Every week, the show awards the best-performing single on the chart in the country during its live broadcast.

In 2014, 28 singles ranked number one on the chart and 27 music acts were awarded first-place trophies. Six songs collected trophies for three weeks and achieved a triple crown: "Miracles in December" by Exo, "Something" by TVXQ, "200%" by AKMU, "Eyes, Nose, Lips" by Taeyang, "Empty" by Winner, and "Happen Ending" by Epik High. Of all releases for the year, only one song earned a perfect score of 10,000 points: "Mr.Mr." by Girls' Generation.

== Scoring system ==
=== 30 August 2012 – 20 February 2014 ===
Digital Single Sales 50%, Album Sales 10%, Age Preference 20%, Global Fan Vote 5%, Live Show Preferences 10%, SMS Vote 5%

=== 27 February 2014 – 4 June 2015 ===
Digital Single Sales 50%, Album Sales 10%, Social Media Points (YouTube official music video views + SNS buzz) 10%, Preference Points (global fan votes + age range preference) 10%, Mnet Broadcast Points 10%, SMS Votes 10%

== Chart history ==
Key
	Triple Crown
	Highest score of the year
—	No show was held

Date	Artist	Song	Points	Ref.
January 2	Exo	"Miracles in December"	—N/a	
January 9	Rain	"30 Sexy"	6,285	
January 16	TVXQ	"Something"	9,244	
January 23	TVXQ	"Something"	—N/a	
January 30	TVXQ	"Something"	—N/a	
February 6	Girl's Day	"Something"	9,047	
February 13	Girl's Day	"Something"	7,332	
February 20	Soyou & Junggigo	"Some"	8,272	
February 27	Soyou & Junggigo	"Some"	7,252	
March 6	Girls' Generation	"Mr.Mr."	9,363	
March 13	Girls' Generation	"Mr.Mr."	10,000	
March 20	2NE1	"Come Back Home"	8,869	
March 27	2NE1	"Come Back Home"	7,585	
April 3	4Minute	"Whatcha Doin' Today"	6,555	
April 10	Apink	"Mr. Chu"	8,323	
April 17	AKMU	"200%"	—N/a	
April 24	AKMU	"200%"	—N/a	
May 1	AKMU	"200%"	—N/a	
May 8	Apink	"Mr. Chu"	9,577	
May 15	Exo-K	"Overdose"	9,706	
May 22	Exo-K	"Overdose"	8,368	
May 29	Infinite	"Last Romeo"	6,473	
June 5	Infinite	"Last Romeo"	7,063	
June 12	Taeyang	"Eyes, Nose, Lips"	7,303	
June 19	Taeyang	"Eyes, Nose, Lips"	9,255	
June 26	Beast	"Good Luck"	—N/a	
July 3	Taeyang	"Eyes, Nose, Lips"	8,353	
July 10	K.Will	"Day 1"	—N/a	
July 17	f(x)	"Red Light"	9,772	
July 24	B1A4	"Solo Day"	—N/a	
July 31	Sistar	"Touch My Body"	7,359	
August 7	Sistar	"Touch My Body"	—N/a	
August 14	Block B	"H.E.R"	—N/a	
August 21	Winner	"Empty"	8,005	
August 28	Winner	"Empty"	7,986	
September 4	Sistar	"I Swear"	7,661	
September 11	Super Junior	"Mamacita"	7,638	
September 18	Winner	"Empty"	7,042	
September 25	Girls' Generation-TTS	"Holler"	8,751	
October 2	Girls' Generation-TTS	"Holler"	—N/a	
October 9	Ailee	"Don't Touch Me"	7,417	
October 16	Roy Kim	"Home"	8,596	
October 23	Gaeko	"No Make Up"	6,709	
October 30	Epik High	"Happen Ending"	—N/a	
November 6	Epik High	"Happen Ending"	7,209	
November 13	Epik High	"Happen Ending"	7,588	
November 20	Kyuhyun	"At Gwanghwamun"	7,947	
November 27	Kyuhyun	"At Gwanghwamun"	—N/a	
December 4	No Broadcast or Winner			
December 11	No Broadcast or Winner			
December 18	Apink	"Luv"	—N/a	
December 25	Apink	"Luv"	7,791	
