= Pinocchio (album) =

Pinocchio / Hot Summer
- Digital cover for Pinocchio

Studio album by f(x)
- Released: April 20, 2011
- Recorded: 2009–2011
- Studios: SM Studios, Seoul
- Genres: K-pop; dance-pop; electronica; electro-rock
- Length: 33:27; 47:47 (repackage)
- Language: Korean
- Label: SM
- Producer: Lee Soo-man

F(x) chronology
Nu ABO (2010)	''Pinocchio / Hot Summer'' (2011)	Electric Shock (2012)

Singles from Pinocchio
- 1. "Pinocchio (Danger)" Released: April 17, 2011

Repackaged edition cover
- Album cover for Hot Summer

Singles from Hot Summer
- 1. "Hot Summer" Released: June 14, 2011

Music video
- "Pinocchio (Danger)" on YouTube "Hot Summer" on YouTube

Pinocchio is the debut studio album by South Korean girl group f(x), released on April 20, 2011 by SM Entertainment. "Pinocchio (Danger)" was released as the album's title track on April 17 as a digital single. The album was the 19th best-selling album in 2011 in South Korea.

A repackaged version, Hot Summer was released on June 14 by SM Entertainment. It included four new tracks, the title track and new song "Hot Summer", the previously released song "...Is It OK?" and the group's first singles "La Cha Ta" and "Chu~♡" released in 2009. The repackaged was the 31st best-selling album in 2011 in South Korea. The album sold 107,669 copies combined in 2011.

== Composition ==
"La Cha Ta" was f(x)'s debut song, and was released digitally on September 2, 2009. Following their first live performance at the Samseong-dong Fashion Center on September 2, 2009, the music video was screened and released online the next day. The group's first broadcast performance of "La Cha Ta" was held on MBC's music show Show! Music Core on September 5, 2009. The music video for the song, released on September 2, 2009, featured the group members dancing on various theater-themed sets. They start by arriving and getting off a pink car and dancing in front of a lighted theater entrance during the night. As the song starts, members Victoria Song, Amber Liu and Sulli enter the theater through the door while Luna and Krystal Jung stay behind to sing first two verses respectively. The scene shifts to individual sets. Amber, dressed as a ringmaster is on a dark stage with fire pits in front, red carpet beneath and huge hanging doors as decors at the back. Victoria, wearing a formal pink dress and jewelry, is in a room with glittering mauve-colored walls and posh pink and white hanging ornaments. Luna, wearing a golden dress, is walking up a black staircase leading to a crescent shaped shimmering golden seat. Sulli, dressed in casual form, is in a bedroom with blue walls, red carpet and a large teddy bear hanging from the wall. Krystal, dressed in formal black, is in a room with many hanging crystals and mirrors at the back. As song proceeds, girls discover that their rooms are connected and greet each other. As the song comes to an end the girls come out of the theater laughing and drive off in their car.

"Chu~♡" (Korean: 츄~♡) is dance-bubblegum pop song . It was released as a maxi-single on November 9, 2009 with the B-sides "Step to Me" and "You are My Destiny." It debuted in top 3 of the Gaon Singles Chart.

"Lollipop" was recorded in two versions. The Chinese-language version features boy band M.I.C. and boy band Shinee in the Korean version. It uses an interpolation of the 1958 hit "Lollipop" written by Julius Dixson and Beverly Ross. The Chinese version was used for cellphone LG Lollipop in China and was not included on the album. The music video was filmed in December 2009, and was released in January 2010.

"Pinocchio (Danger)" (피노키오; Pinokio) was the lead single used to promote Pinocchio. The song was released digitally on April 17, 2011, and an accompanying promotional music video was released through YouTube on April 19, 2011. The music video shows f(x) dancing choreography by Jillian Meyers, her first work with f(x). The video features two dance sets, one with white carved walls, manual-rotating fans and pyramids on the floor and in the background, another one white set with swirling black and white, and five individual sets (one for each member). Victoria is in an orange room with different boxes, Amber is in a white room with black drawings, Luna is in a red room with checkered red flooring, Sulli is in a hexagon blue-green and pink room, and Krystal is in a blue triangular room.

"Gangsta Boy", an album track, marked the first time the Danish music producers and songwriters Thomas Troelsen and Mikkel Remee Sigvardt collaborated with f(x). Hong Ji-yoo also help writing the lyrics for the song. It was performed with "Pinocchio (Danger)" during f(x)'s music show promotions of the album.

"Hot Summer" is a Korean cover of the song of the same title, originally recorded by the German band Monrose. Like the 2009 singles "La Cha Ta" and "Chu~♡", it was included in the Hot Summer repackage of the album and was released as a single on June 14, 2011.

== Release and promotions ==
The full music video for "Pinocchio (Danger)" was released on April 19, 2011. F(x) had their first live televised performance after a year-long hiatus through KBS's Music Bank on April 22, 2011. The song "Gangsta Boy" was chosen to be part of the special performance. "Pinocchio (Danger)" won a total of 8 music show awards: 3 on Inkigayo, 3 on M Countdown and 2 on Music Bank, the first win was on April 29 in Music Bank. The promotions of "Pinocchio (Danger)" ended on May 29.

The music video for "Hot Summer" was released on June 17 through SM Entertainment's official YouTube account. The first performance of the song was on June 17, on the show Music Bank. The song won 2 music show awards: one on Inkigayo on June 26 and another on M! Countdown on June 30. The promotions of the song and album ended on July 10, on Inkigayo.

== Commercial performance ==
Pinocchio debuted atop the Gaon Album Chart for the week ending April 23, 2011, becoming the group's first number one album and second Top 5. The album dropped the chart the following week and re-entered at number 2 in its third week. It was the second best-selling album of April 2011 with 46,284 copies sold. It was also the 19th best-selling album of 2011 with 61,637 copies sold. The repackage Hot Summer debuted and peaked at number 2 on the Gaon Album Chart for the week ending June 18, 2011, becoming the group's third Top 5. In its second week fell to number 8. It was the third best-selling album of June 2011 with 26,616 copies sold. It was also the 31st best-selling album of 2011 with 46,032 copies sold.

== Track listings ==
Pinocchio track listing
No.	Title	Lyrics	Music	Length
1.	"Pinocchio (Danger)" (피노키오; Pinokio)	Kenzie; Misfit	Dwight Watson; Jeff Hoeppner; Alex Cantrall; Hitchhiker	3:14
2.	"Sweet Witches" (빙그르; Bing-geureu)	Kim Bu-min	Hitchhiker	3:28
3.	"Dangerous"	Kenzie; Nermin Harambašić; Robin Jenssen; Ronny Svendsen; Anne Judith Stokke Wik	Nermin Harambašić; Robin Jenssen; Ronny Svendsen; Anne Judith Stokke Wik	3:14
4.	"Beautiful Goodbye"	Jo Yoon-kyung	Carsten Schack; Kenneth Karlin; Alex Cantrall; Lindy Robbins	4:06
5.	"Gangsta Boy"	Hong Ji-yoo; Thomas Troelsen; Mikkel Remee Sigvardt	Thomas Troelsen; Mikkel Remee Sigvardt	3:09
6.	"Love" (아이; Ai)	Song Soo-yun; Han Jae-ho; Kim Seung-soo	Han Jae-ho; Kim Seung-soo	3:15
7.	"Stand Up!"	Shin Jae-pyung	Shin Jae-pyung	3:55
8.	"My Style"	Lee Ji-eun; Ryan Jhun; Antwann Frost; Natasha Bougknight; Lauren Seymour	Ryan Jhun; Antwann Frost; Natasha Bougknight; Lauren Seymour	3:41
9.	"So Into U"	Kim Eun-soo; Shim Eun-ji	Shim Eun-ji	3:35
10.	"Lollipop" (featuring Shinee)	Hong Ji-yoo; Ryan Jhun; Tysear; Reefa; Antwann Frost; Brande Kelley	Ryan Jhun; Tysear; Reefa; Antwann Frost; Brande Kelley	3:11
Total length:				34:40

Hot Summer (repackage) track listing
No.	Title	Lyrics	Music	Length
1.	"Hot Summer"	Kenzie	Thomas Troelsen; Mikkel Remee Sigvardt	3:46
2.	"Pinocchio (Danger)" (피노키오; Pinokio)	Kenzie; Misfit	Dwight Watson; Jeff Hoeppner; Alex Cantrall; Hitchhiker	3:14
3.	"Sweet Witches" (빙그르; Bing-geureu)	Kim Bu-min	Hitchhiker	3:28
4.	"...Is It OK?" (좋아해도 되나요; Johahaedo Doenayo)	Hwang Hyun	Hwang Hyun	3:11
5.	"Dangerous"	Kenzie; Nermin Harambašić; Robin Jenssen; Ronny Svendsen; Anne Judith Stokke Wik	Nermin Harambašić; Robin Jenssen; Ronny Svendsen; Anne Judith Stokke Wik	3:14
6.	"Beautiful Goodbye"	Jo Yoon-kyung	Carsten Schack; Kenneth Karlin; Alex Cantrall; Lindy Robbins	4:06
7.	"Gangsta Boy"	Hong Ji-yoo; Thomas Troelsen; Mikkel Remee Sigvardt	Thomas Troelsen; Mikkel Remee Sigvardt	3:09
8.	"Love" (아이; Ai)	Song Soo-yun; Han Jae-ho; Kim Seung-soo	Han Jae-ho; Kim Seung-soo	3:15
9.	"Stand Up!"	Shin Jae-pyung	Shin Jae-pyung	3:55
10.	"My Style"	Lee Ji-eun; Ryan Jhun; Antwann Frost; Natasha Bougknight; Lauren Seymour	Ryan Jhun; Antwann Frost; Natasha Bougknight; Lauren Seymour	3:41
11.	"So Into U"	Kim Eun-soo; Shim Eun-ji	Shim Eun-ji	3:35
12.	"Lollipop" (featuring Shinee)	Hong Ji-yoo; Ryan Jhun; Tysear; Reefa; Antwann Frost; Brande Kelley	Ryan Jhun; Tysear; Reefa; Antwann Frost; Brande Kelley	3:14
13.	"La Cha Ta" (라차타)	Kenzie	Kenzie	3:12
14.	"Chu~♡"	Jo Yoon-kyung	Anders Wilhelm Wollbeck; Daniel Presley; Mattias Lindblom	3:10
Total length:				48:20

== Charts ==
Album	Peak chart position
Album	Gaon Chart
Pinocchio	1
Hot Summer	2

=== Sales and certifications ===
Chart	Amount
Gaon physical sales (Pinocchio)	73,921
Gaon physical sales (Hot Summer)	70,134

== Release history ==
Country	Date	Format	Label
South Korea	April 20, 2011	CD, Digital download	SM Entertainment
Worldwide	April 20, 2011	Digital download	SM Entertainment
South Korea	June 14, 2011 (Repackage)	CD, Digital download	SM Entertainment
Worldwide	June 14, 2011 (Repackage)	Digital download	SM Entertainment
