= List of M Countdown Chart winners (2010) =

Winners of South Korean music program M Countdown

M Countdown Chart winners (2010)

The M Countdown Chart is a record chart on the South Korean Mnet television music program M Countdown. Every week, the show awards the best-performing single on the chart in the country during its live broadcast.

In 2010, 32 singles ranked number one on the chart and 24 music acts were awarded first-place trophies. Three songs collected trophies for three weeks and achieved a triple crown: "Without U" by 2PM, "Can't Nobody" by 2NE1 and "Hoot" by Girls' Generation. No release for the year earned a perfect score, but "Can't Let You Go Even If I Die" by 2AM acquired the highest point total on the February 25 broadcast with a score of 976.

== Chart history ==
Key
	Triple Crown
	Highest score of the year
—	No show was held

Date	Artist	Song	Points	Ref.
February 25	2AM	"Can't Let You Go Even If I Die"	976	
March 4	Kara	"Lupin"	938	
March 11	Kara	"Lupin"	931	
March 18	T-ara	"I Go Crazy Because Of You"	938	
March 25	Beast	"Shock"	918	
April 1	2AM	"I Did Wrong"	938	
April 8	Rain	"Love Song"	926	
April 15	Rain	"Love Song"	959	
April 22	Lee Hyori	"Chitty Chitty Bang Bang"	942	
April 29	2PM	"Without U"	943	
May 6	2PM	"Without U"	930	
May 13	2PM	"Without U"	931	
May 20	Seo In-guk	"Love U"	939	
May 27	Wonder Girls	"2 Different Tears"	927	
June 3	MBLAQ	"Y"	930	
June 10	CNBLUE	"Love"	868	
June 17	4Minute	"HuH"	859	
June 24	Seo In-young	"Goodbye Romance"	907	
July 1	CNBLUE	"Love"	922	
July 8	Taeyang	"I Need a Girl"	964	
July 15	Taeyang	"I Need a Girl"	939	
July 22	Miss A	"Bad Girl Good Girl"	940	
July 29	Seven	"Better Together"	955	
August 5	Seven	"Better Together"	920	
August 12	G.NA	"I'll Back Off So You Can Live Better"	905	
August 19	DJ DOC	"I'm This Person"	912	
August 26	Jo Sungmo	"I Wanna Cheat"	—N/a	
September 2	Taeyang	"I'll Be There"	914	
September 9	F.T. Island	"Love Love Love"	935	
September 16	2NE1	"Clap Your Hands"	930	
September 23	2NE1	"Can't Nobody"	—N/a	
September 30	2NE1	"Can't Nobody"	927	
October 7	2NE1	"Can't Nobody"	887	
October 14	Beast	"Breath"	924	
October 21	Miss A	"Breathe"	892	
October 28	2PM	"I'll Be Back"	951	
November 4	2PM	"I'll Be Back"	946	
November 11	Psy	"Right Now"	907	
November 18	Girls' Generation	"Hoot"	—N/a	
November 25	Girls' Generation	"Hoot"	—N/a	
December 2	Girls' Generation	"Hoot"	—N/a	
December 9	T-ara	"Why Are You Being Like This?"	920	
December 16	T-ara	"Yayaya"	911	
December 23	IU	"Good Day"	901	
December 30	GD & TOP	"Oh Yeah"	943	
