= List of M Countdown Chart winners (2008) =

Winners of South Korean music program M Countdown

M Countdown Chart winners (2008)

The M Countdown Chart is a record chart on the South Korean Mnet television music program M Countdown. Every week, the show awards the best-performing single on the chart in the country during its live broadcast.

In 2008, 17 songs ranked number one on the chart and 14 acts received first-place trophies. Six songs collected trophies for three consecutive weeks and achieved a triple crown: "Circus" by MC Mong, "Look Only At Me" by Taeyang, "So Hot" by Wonder Girls, "U-Go-Girl" by Lee Hyori, "Haru Haru" by Big Bang, and "Mirotic" by TVXQ. Girls' Generation acquired the highest point total of the year on the February 28 broadcast, with a score of 965 for "Kissing You".

== Chart history ==
Key
	Triple Crown
	Highest score of the year
—	No show was held

Episode	Date	Artist	Song	Points	Ref.
89	January 17	Big Bang	"Last Farewell"	939	
90	January 31	SeeYa	"Sad Footsteps"	914	
91	February 14	Girls' Generation	"Kissing You"	927	
92	February 28	Girls' Generation	"Kissing You"	965	
93	March 13	Jewelry	"One More Time"	924	
94	March 27	Gummy	"I'm Sorry"	916	
95	April 10	Girls' Generation	"Baby Baby"	919	
96	April 24	Lee Seung-gi	"I'll Give You My Everything"	949	
97	May 8	MC Mong	"Circus"	912	
98	May 22	MC Mong	"Circus"	943	
99	June 12	MC Mong	"Circus"	923	
100	June 19	Taeyang	"Look Only At Me"	936	
101	June 26	Taeyang	"Look Only At Me"	951	
102	July 3	Taeyang	"Look Only At Me"	942	
103	July 10	Wonder Girls	"So Hot"	939	
104	July 17	Wonder Girls	"So Hot"	945	
105	July 24	Wonder Girls	"So Hot"	944	
106	July 31	Lee Hyori	"U-Go-Girl"	944	
107	August 14	Lee Hyori	"U-Go-Girl"	939	
108	August 21	Lee Hyori	"U-Go-Girl"	936	
109	August 28	Big Bang	"Haru Haru"	950	
110	September 4	Big Bang	"Haru Haru"	955	
111	September 11	Big Bang	"Haru Haru"	946	
112	September 18	Shinee	"Love Like Oxygen"	921	
113	September 25	Big Bang	"Haru Haru"	960	
114	October 2	F.T. Island	"After Love"	939	
115	October 9	TVXQ	"Mirotic"	950	
116	October 23	TVXQ	"Mirotic"	952	
117	October 30	TVXQ	"Mirotic"	963	
118	November 6	Rain	"Rainism"	933	
119	November 27	Rain	"Rainism"	939	
120	December 4	Big Bang	"Sunset Glow"	949	
