= List of M Countdown Chart winners (2009) =

Winners of South Korean music program M Countdown

M Countdown Chart winners (2009)

The M Countdown Chart is a record chart on the South Korean Mnet television music program M Countdown. Every week, the show awards the best-performing single on the chart in the country during its live broadcast.

== Chart history ==
Key
	Triple Crown
	Highest score of the year
—	No show was held

Episode	Date	Artist	Song	Points	Ref.
121	January 8	SS501	"U R Man"	938	
122	January 15	SS501	"U R Man"	928	
123	January 22	Seungri	"Strong Baby"	953	
124	February 5	Seungri	"Strong Baby"	946	
125	February 19	Seungri	"Strong Baby"	951	
126	February 26	Seungri	"Strong Baby"	942	
127	March 5	Kara	"Honey"	933	
128	March 12	Kara	"Honey"	960	
129	March 26	Kara	"Honey"	953	
130	April 2	Davichi	"8282"	961.4	
131	April 9	Super Junior	"Sorry, Sorry"	968.0	
132	April 16	Son Dambi	"Saturday Night"	948.1	
133	April 23	Super Junior	"Sorry, Sorry"	958.0	
134	April 30	Davichi	"8282"	956.2	
135	May 7	2PM	"Again & Again"	970.2	
136	May 14	2PM	"Again & Again"	973.4	
137	May 21	2PM	"Again & Again"	975.0	
138	May 28	2PM	"Again & Again"	946.5	
139	June 4	SG Wannabe	"I Love You"	945.1	
140	June 12	SG Wannabe	"I Love You"	938.1	
141	June 18	V.O.S	"Trouble"	941.9	
142	June 25	V.O.S	"Trouble"	946.0	
143	July 2	2PM	"I Hate You"	941.3	
144	July 9	2PM	"I Hate You"	968.0	
145	July 16	2PM	"I Hate You"	969.8	
146	July 23	2NE1	"I Don't Care"	977.9	
147	July 30	2PM	"I Hate You"	962.6	
148	August 6	2NE1	"I Don't Care"	979.8	
149	August 13	2NE1	"I Don't Care"	981.3	
150	August 20	Brown Eyed Girls	"Abracadabra"	944.5	
151	August 27	2NE1	"I Don't Care"	978.2	
152	September 3	Brown Eyed Girls	"Abracadabra"	970.9	
153	September 10	G-Dragon	"Heartbreaker"	973.2	
154	September 17	G-Dragon	"Heartbreaker"	974.5	
155	September 24	G-Dragon	"Heartbreaker"	975.7	
156	October 1	4Minute	"Muzik"	959.7	
157	October 8	Park Hyo-shin	"After Love"	959.0	
158	October 15	Kim Tae-woo	"Love Rain"	952.9	
159	October 22	Kim Tae-woo	"Love Rain"		
160	October 29	Park Hyo-shin	"After Love"	958.0	
161	November 5	Shinee	"Ring Ding Dong"	972.6	
