= 27th Golden Disc Awards =

2013 South Korean music awards ceremony

- Date: January 15–16, 2013
- Location: Sepang International Circuit, Kuala Lumpur
- Country: Malaysia
- Hosted by: Nicole Jung; Jung Yong-hwa; Kim Da-som; Lee Hong-gi

Television/radio coverage
- Network: JTBC

The 27th Golden Disc Awards took place on January 15–16, 2013, at the Sepang International Circuit in Kuala Lumpur, Malaysia. It honored the best in South Korean music released from January 1, 2012, through December 2012. Nicole Jung, Jung Yong-hwa, Kim Da-som, Lee Hong-gi served as the hosts for the ceremony.

== Criteria ==
The winners of the digital music and album categories were determined by music sales (80%) and a panel of music experts (20%). The Rookie Artist of the Year award was based on album sales (80%), a panel of music experts (10%) and online votes (10%), while the Popularity Award was based on online votes (80%) and album sales (20%).

== Winners and nominees ==
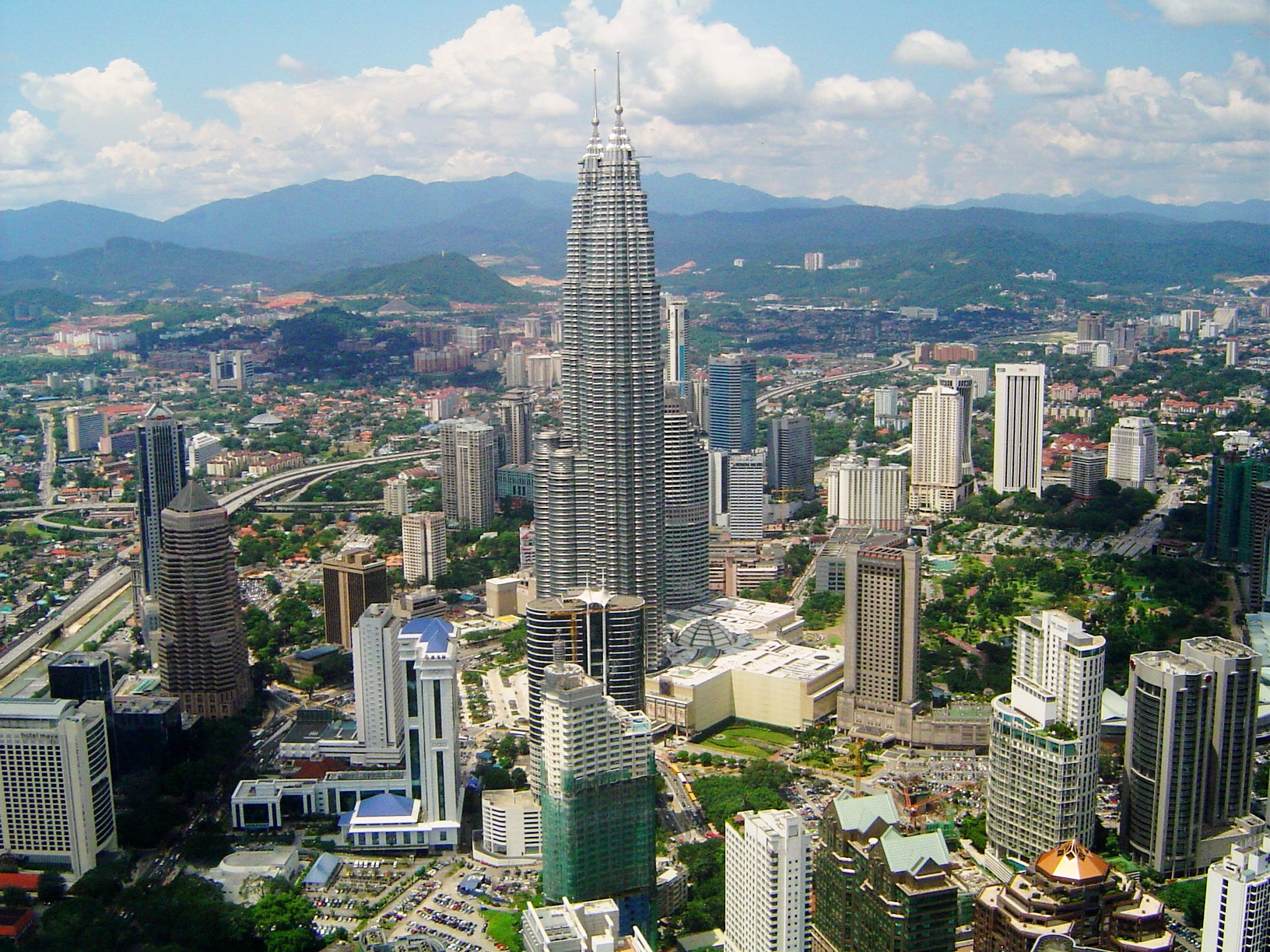
The ceremony was held in Kuala Lumpur, Malaysia

=== Main awards ===
Winners and nominees are listed in alphabetical order. Winners are listed first and emphasized in bold.

Digital Daesang (Song of the Year)	Disc Daesang (Album of the Year)
**Psy – "Gangnam Style"**; 2NE1 – "I Love You"; Big Bang – "Fantastic Baby"; f(x) – "Electric Shock"; G-Dragon – "Crayon"; Huh Gak – "The Person Who Once Loved Me"; K.Will – "I Need You"; Miss A – "Touch"; Secret – "Poison"; Sistar – "Alone"; T-ara – "Lovey-Dovey"	**Super Junior – Sexy, Free & Single**; 4Minute – Volume Up; B1A4 – Ignition; Beast – Midnight Sun; CNBLUE – Ear Fun; F.T. Island – Grown-Up; Infinite – Infinitize; Kara – Pandora; Shinee – Sherlock
Digital Song Bonsang	Album Bonsang
**2NE1 – "I Love You"**; **Big Bang – "Fantastic Baby"**; **f(x) – "Electric Shock"**; **G-Dragon – "Crayon"**; **Huh Gak – "The Person Who Once Loved Me"**; **K.Will – "I Need You"**; **Miss A – "Touch"**; **Psy – "Gangnam Style"**; **Secret – "Poison"**; **Sistar – "Alone"**; **T-ara – "Lovey-Dovey"**; 2AM – "I Wonder If You Hurt Like Me"; Ailee – "Heaven"; Baek Ji-young – "Voice"; Busker Busker – "Cherry Blossom Ending"; Dynamic Duo – "Without You"; F.T. Island – "Severely"; Girls' Generation-TTS – "Twinkle"; IU – "Every End of the Day"; Juniel – "Illa Illa"; Trouble Maker – "Trouble Maker"; Wonder Girls – "Like This"	**4Minute – Volume Up**; **B1A4 – Ignition**; **Beast – Midnight Sun**; **CNBLUE – Ear Fun**; **F.T. Island – Grown-Up**; **Infinite – Infinitize**; **Kara – Pandora**; **Shinee – Sherlock**; **Super Junior – Sexy, Free & Single**; Big Bang – Alive; Busker Busker – Busker Busker 1st Album; Exo – Mama; f(x) – Electric Shock; G-Dragon – One of A Kind; Girls' Generation-TTS – Twinkle; Jang Wooyoung – 23, Male, Single; Jay Park – New Breed; Kim Sung-kyu – Another Me; MBLAQ – 100% Ver.; Psy – Psy 6 (Six Rules), Part 1; Shinhwa – The Return; T-ara – Funky Town; TVXQ – Catch Me
Rookie Artist of the Year	Popularity Award
**Ailee**; **B.A.P**; **Exo**; **Juniel**; **Lee Hi**; Block B; Busker Busker; John Park; NU'EST; Ulala Session	**Shinee**; **G-Dragon**

=== Genre awards ===
Best Hip-Hop Award	Single Album Award
**Epik High – "Up" (feat. Park Bom)**; Dynamic Duo – "Without You"; Leessang – "My Love"; Verbal Jint – "You Deserve Better"	**Teen Top – It's**; After School – Flashback; B.A.P – Warrior; NU'EST – Face; Ulala Session – Ulala Sensation
Best Dance Performance	Best Group Performance
**Trouble Maker**	**Infinite**

=== Special awards ===
Award	Winner(s)
Malaysia's Favorite Star Award	Kara; CNBLUE
MSN International Award	Big Bang
MSN Southeast Asia Award	Super Junior
Next Generation Award	BtoB
Samsung Galaxy Star Award	Sistar
InStyle Fashionista Award	Hongki
JTBC Best Artist Award	Beast
Producer Award	Han Sung-ho (FNC Entertainment)
