= Love Me Again (V song) =

2023 single by V

Single by V

from the EP Layover
- Released: August 10, 2023
- Genre: R&B
- Length: 3:02
- Label: Big Hit
- Songwriters: Donghyun Kim; Freekind; Gigi; Jinsu Park
- Producers: Freekind; Jinsu Park

V singles chronology
"Christmas Tree" (2021)	"Love Me Again" / "Rainy Days" (2023)	"Slow Dancing" (2023)

Music video
- "Love Me Again" on YouTube

"Love Me Again" is a song recorded by South Korean singer V of BTS for his debut EP Layover. It was released on August 10, 2023, by Big Hit Music. An R&B track, the song was written by Freekind, Jinsu Park, Donghyun Kim, and Gigi, with the first two also responsible for production.

== Accolades ==
Prior to V beginning promotions on domestic television music shows, "Love Me Again" achieved a triple crown on M Countdown. The song also won three non-consecutive Melon Popularity Awards for the weeks ending August 21, 2023, and September 4 and 11. It was later nominated for Best Vocal Performance – Solo and Song of the Year at the 2023 MAMA Awards.

Music program awards for "Love Me Again"
Program	Date	Ref.
M Countdown	August 24, 2023	
M Countdown	August 31, 2023	
M Countdown	September 7, 2023	

== Charts ==
=== Weekly charts ===
Weekly chart performance
Chart (2023–2024)	Peak position
Canada Hot 100 (Billboard)	91
Global 200 (Billboard)	12
Hong Kong (Billboard)	19
India International (IMI)	2
Indonesia (Billboard)	16
Japan Hot 100 (Billboard)	76
Japan Heatseekers (Billboard)	3
Japan Digital Singles (Oricon)	6
Malaysia (Billboard)	16
Malaysia International (RIM)	11
MENA (IFPI)	10
Netherlands (Global Top 40)	28
New Zealand Hot Singles (RMNZ)	5
Philippines (Billboard)	13
Saudi Arabia (IFPI)	10
Singapore (RIAS)	9
South Korea (Circle)	22
UK Indie (Official Charts)	41
UK Singles Downloads (Official Charts)	9
UK Singles Sales (OCC)	9
US Billboard Hot 100	96
US World Digital Song Sales (Billboard)	1
Vietnam (Vietnam Hot 100)	3

=== Monthly charts ===
Monthly chart performance
Chart (2023)	Position
South Korea (Circle)	43

=== Year-end charts ===
Year-end chart performance
Chart (2024)	Position
India International (IMI)	15

== Release history ==
Release dates and formats
Region	Date	Format(s)	Label
Various	August 10, 2023	Digital download; streaming	Big Hit
