= Pinocchio (Danger) =

Single by f(x)

from the album Pinocchio
- Released: April 17, 2011
- Studio: SM Blue Cup Studio, Seoul, South Korea
- Genre: Electropop; dance-pop
- Length: 3:09
- Label: SM Entertainment; Avex Asia
- Composers: Alex Cantrall; Jeff Hoeppner; Dwight Watson; Hitchhiker
- Lyricists: Misfit; Kenzie

f(x) singles chronology
"Is It OK?" (2011)	"Pinocchio (Danger)" (2011)	"Hot Summer" (2011)

Music video
- "Pinocchio (Danger)" on YouTube

"Pinocchio (Danger)" (피노키오; Pinokio) is a song and lead single by South Korean girl group f(x) from their first studio album Pinocchio. The song was released digitally on April 17, 2011 through various music portal websites by the distributing and record label agency SM Entertainment. Accompanying promotional music video was released through YouTube on April 19, 2011.

== Music video ==
The teaser for music video for the song was released on April 14, 2011 and the full music video was released on April 18, 2011 through YouTube.

The music video shows f(x) dancing the choreography by Jillian Meyers, thus featuring her first work with f(x), and would soon collaborate again in singles like Electric Shock and Rum Pum Pum Pum. The video features two dance sets, one with white carved walls, manual-rotating fans and pyramids on the floor and in the background, another one white set with swirling black and white, giving an illusion, and five individual sets (for each member). Leader Victoria on an orange room with different boxes, Amber on a white room with black drawings, Luna on a red room with checkered red flooring, Sulli on a hexagon blue-green and pink room and Krystal on a blue room in a triangular angle. Throughout the video, the members dance to choreography, gets close ups changing outfit and meets in Luna's set, and a balloon (designed like Pinocchio) appears, startling them.

== Promotion ==
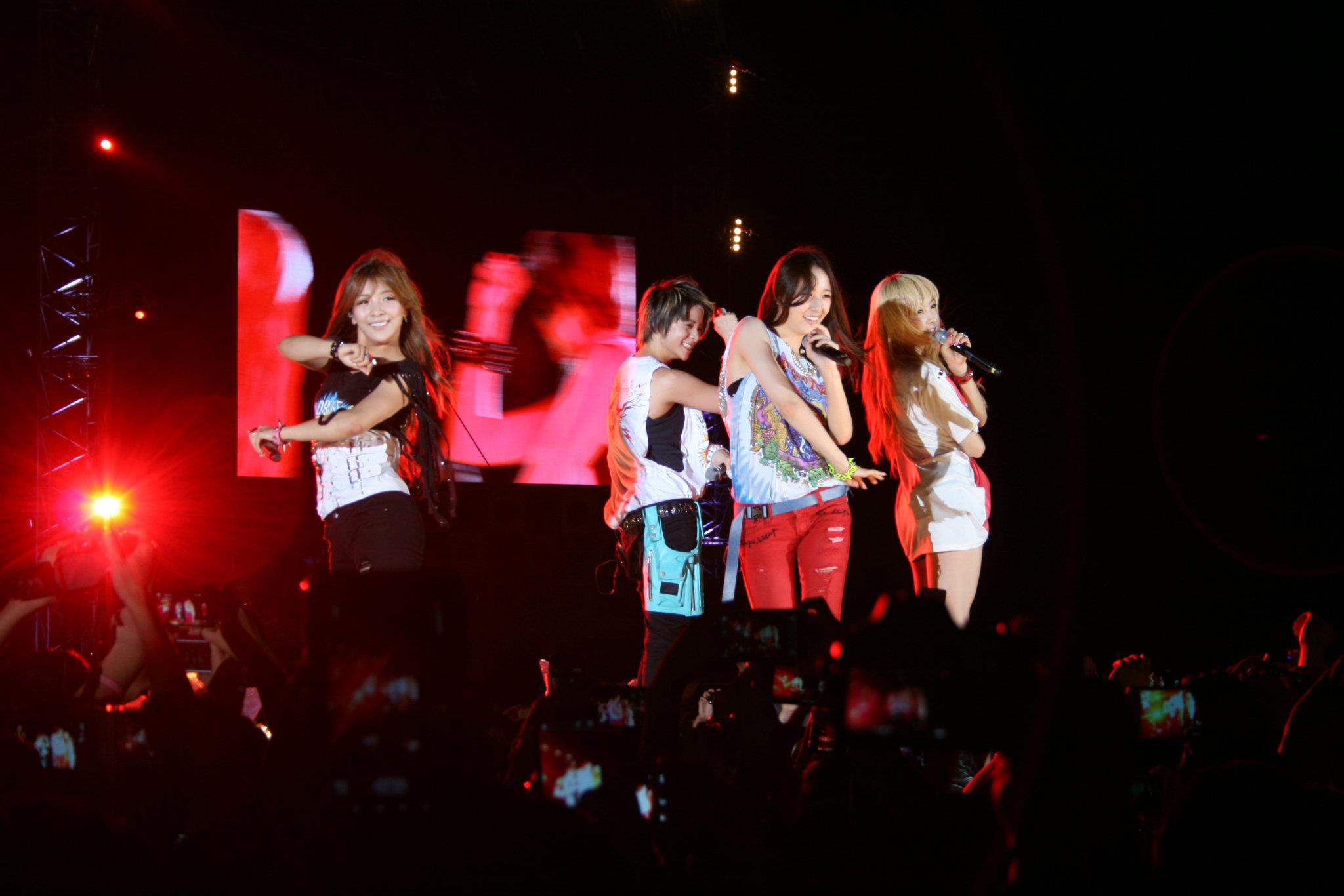
f(x) without Sulli (due to drama filming) performing "Danger" at the 2012 Yeosu World Expo Pop Festival.

f(x) made their first live performance stage of the song through appearance in one of the episodes of KBS's Music Bank on April 22, 2011. The song "Gangsta Boy" was also chosen to be part of the special comeback performances. "Pinocchio (Danger)" won a total of 8 music show awards: 3 on Inkigayo, 3 on M Countdown and 2 on Music Bank, the first win was on April 29 in Music Bank. The promotions of "Pinocchio (Danger)" and the album ended on May 29, 2011.

== Charts ==
Chart	Peak position
South Korea (Gaon Singles Chart)	1
Billboard K-Pop Hot 100	69

== Accolades ==
Music program awards
Program	Date
Music Bank	April 29, 2011
Music Bank	May 20, 2011
M Countdown	May 5, 2011
M Countdown	May 12, 2011
M Countdown	May 19, 2011
Inkigayo	May 8, 2011
Inkigayo	May 15, 2011
Inkigayo	May 22, 2011

== Credits ==
Credits adapted from album's liner notes.

=== Studio ===
- Recorded and digitally edited at SM Blue Cup Studio
- Mixed at SM Yellow Tail Studio
- Mastered at Sonic Korea

=== Personnel ===
- SM Entertainment – executive producer
- Lee Soo-man – producer
- Kim Young-min – executive supervisor
- f(x) – vocals, background vocals
- Kenzie – lyrics
- Misfit – lyrics
- Alex Cantrall – composition
- Jeff Hoeppner – composition
- Dwight Watson – composition
- Hitchhiker – composition, arrangement, vocal directing, sound, guitar, keyboard
- Lee Seong-ho – recording, digital editing
- Jung Eui-seok – recording
- Gu Jong-pil – mixing
- Jeon Hoon – mastering
