= Electric Shock (EP) =

- Digital cover

EP by f(x)
- Released: June 10, 2012
- Recorded: 2012
- Genres: K-pop; electropop; EDM
- Length: 21:10
- Language: Korean
- Label: SM Entertainment
- Producer: Lee Soo-man

F(x) chronology
Pinocchio (2011)	Electric Shock (2012)	Pink Tape (2013)

Singles from Electric Shock
- 1. "Electric Shock" Released: June 10, 2012

Music video
- "Electric Shock" on YouTube

Electric Shock is the second extended play (EP) by South Korean girl group f(x). The EP was released digitally on June 10, 2012, and released physically on June 13, 2012, under SM Entertainment. The EP's title track, "Electric Shock", as well as the EP, reached the top spot on the weekly Gaon Charts. The EP sold a total of more than 70,000 copies in South Korea.

== Composition ==
The EP's single and title track, "Electric Shock", is an electropop and dance-pop song. The lyrics start each line with the word, "전기충격" ("jeongichunggyeok", meaning "electric shock" in English). It was written and arranged by Willem Laseroms, Maarten ten Hove and Joachim Vermeulen Windsant, and produced by Future Presidents. The music video was released on June 11, 2012, and was choreographed by Jillian Meyers.

The track "Jet" is composed by SM Entertainment's songwriter Kenzie; the track has hip-hop rhythms and electronic-dance compositions over a pop structure. Amber co-wrote the rap.

The track "Zig Zag" was especially produced to focus on the "youthful and refreshing blend of vocals" of the five f(x) members which adds to the urban electronic sound created by the use of electric guitars and drum beats. The track was composed and written by music producer Hitchhiker. The lyrics were penned by Kim Bumin who often works closely with Hitchhiker.

The track "Beautiful Stranger" features Amber, Luna and Krystal only and has an urban and hip-hop feel. The vocals and high notes are provided by Luna and Krystal, while Amber raps. The piece has a heavy drum beat synth and percussion performed through electric guitars. The chorus has groove bass lines. The song was composed by a team of music producers that included Aminata Kabba, Jason Gill, and songwriter Cutfather.

== Promotion ==
On June 10, 2012, the Electric Shock EP was released digitally in Korea and globally. f(x) began promotions for the title track, "Electric Shock", on Mnet's M! Countdown on June 14 and also performed "Jet" as part of a special performance. They went on to perform "Electric Shock" on programs such as Music Bank, Show! Music Core and Inkigayo. "Electric Shock" won a total of nine first-place trophies on these shows.

== Critical reception ==
On January 22, 2013, the song "Electric Shock" was voted by Korean music industry professionals as the number four song on a list of the top 10 songs domestic songs of 2012, and the Electric Shock EP as eighth in the top 10 domestic albums of the year.

== Chart performance ==
The Electric Shock EP topped the Gaon Album Chart in its first week of release. The title track debuted at number one on the Gaon Digital Chart, selling 630,510 copies in its first week. It then fell to number three selling 285,501 copies the following week. By the end of 2012, the record had sold 74,694 copies, and the title track 2,150,840 digital copies.

== Track listing ==
Electric Shock track listing
No.	Title	Lyrics	Music	Arrangement	Length
1.	"Electric Shock"	Seo Ji-eum	Willem Laseroms; Maarten ten Hove; Joachim Vermeulen Windsant	Willem Laseroms; Maarten ten Hove; Joachim Vermeulen Windsant	3:15
2.	"Jet" (Korean: 제트별; RR: Jeteu Byeol; lit. 'Jet Star')	Kenzie	Kenzie	Kenzie	3:21
3.	"Zig Zag" (지그재그; Jigeu Jaegeu)	Kim Bu-min	Hitchhiker	Hitchhiker	3:46
4.	"Beautiful Stranger" (Sung by Amber, Luna, Krystal)	Misfit	Aminata Kabba; Jason Gill; Cutfather	Lim Kwang-wook; Polar Monkeys	4:06
5.	"Love Hate"	Misfit	Si Hulbert; Amy Richardson; Hannah Phaisey; Karen Ann Poole	Si Hulbert; Amy Richardson; Hannah Phaisey; Karen Ann Poole	3:10
6.	"Let's Try" (Korean: 훌쩍; RR: Huljjeok; lit. 'Swept')	Misfit	Niara Scarlett; Pete "Boxta" Martin	Lim Kwang-wook; Jung Soo-wan	3:32
Total length:					21:10

== Charts ==
=== Weekly charts ===
Weekly chart performance for Electric Shock
Chart (2012)	Peak position
Japanese Albums (Oricon)	16
South Korean Albums (Gaon)	1
US Heatseekers Albums (Billboard)	21
US World Albums (Billboard)	2

=== Year-end charts ===
Year-end chart performance for Electric Shock
Chart (2012)	Position
South Korean Albums (Gaon)	20
