= M Countdown =

South Korean music television program

- Logo used since 2024
- Genre: Music
- Presented by: Park Gun-wook (Zerobaseone); So Jung-hwan (Treasure); Lee Kye-hoon (KickFlip)
- Country of origin: South Korea
- Original language: Korean
- No. of seasons: 14
- No. of episodes: 944

Production
- Running time: 120 minutes
- Production company: CJ E&M

Original release
- Network: Mnet
- Release: July 29, 2004 – present

M Countdown (Korean: 엠카운트다운) is a South Korean music program broadcast by Mnet from the CJ E&M Center Studio in Sangam-dong, Mapo District, Seoul. It features appearances by popular music artists who also perform live on stage. First hosted by Leeteuk, Shindong, and Kangin of Super Junior, the show has had various celebrity emcees through the years. As of March 2026, M Countdown is hosted by Park Gun-wook of Zerobaseone, So Jung-hwan of Treasure, Lee Kye-hoon of KickFlip.

== Broadcast ==
M Countdown airs live on domestic television at 6PM KST every Thursday. Live streaming is available internationally via the M Countdown On Air page on Mwave's website.

In the Philippines, online multi-view live broadcast of the show is available via gigafest.smart. It began airing on the free-to-air TV5 network from January 31, 2021, however due to low ratings on the network, it was concluded on March 6, 2022. Full episodes with English subtitles are shown every Sunday night, along with another K-Chart show Music Bank on GMA Hallypop. Meanwhile, some episodes of M Countdown like Hot Debut and Comeback Stages are already available on YouTube Philippines since January 2022.

== Segments ==
Current segments on the show include Cha-Cha-Cha, MCD Dance Challenge, MCD Vocal Challenge, Storage M, and M Studio. Discontinued segments formerly aired include: B'SHOP (songwriter Bang Si-hyuk introduced a selection of hit songs), MCD Drama (show-hosts acted out various scenarios), MCD News (reported music industry news), and MCD Ranking (ranked celebrities based on certain topics).

== Official hosts ==
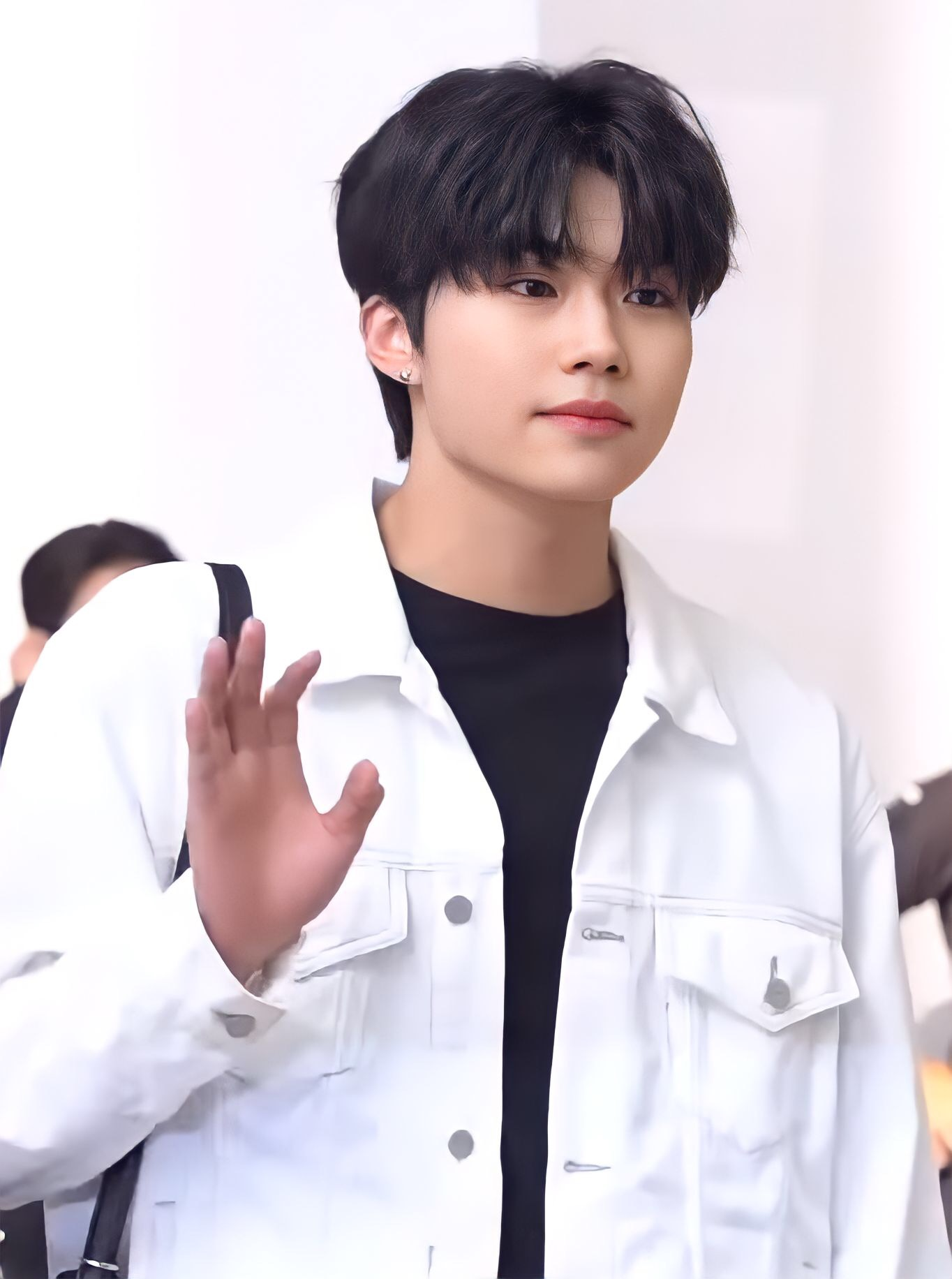
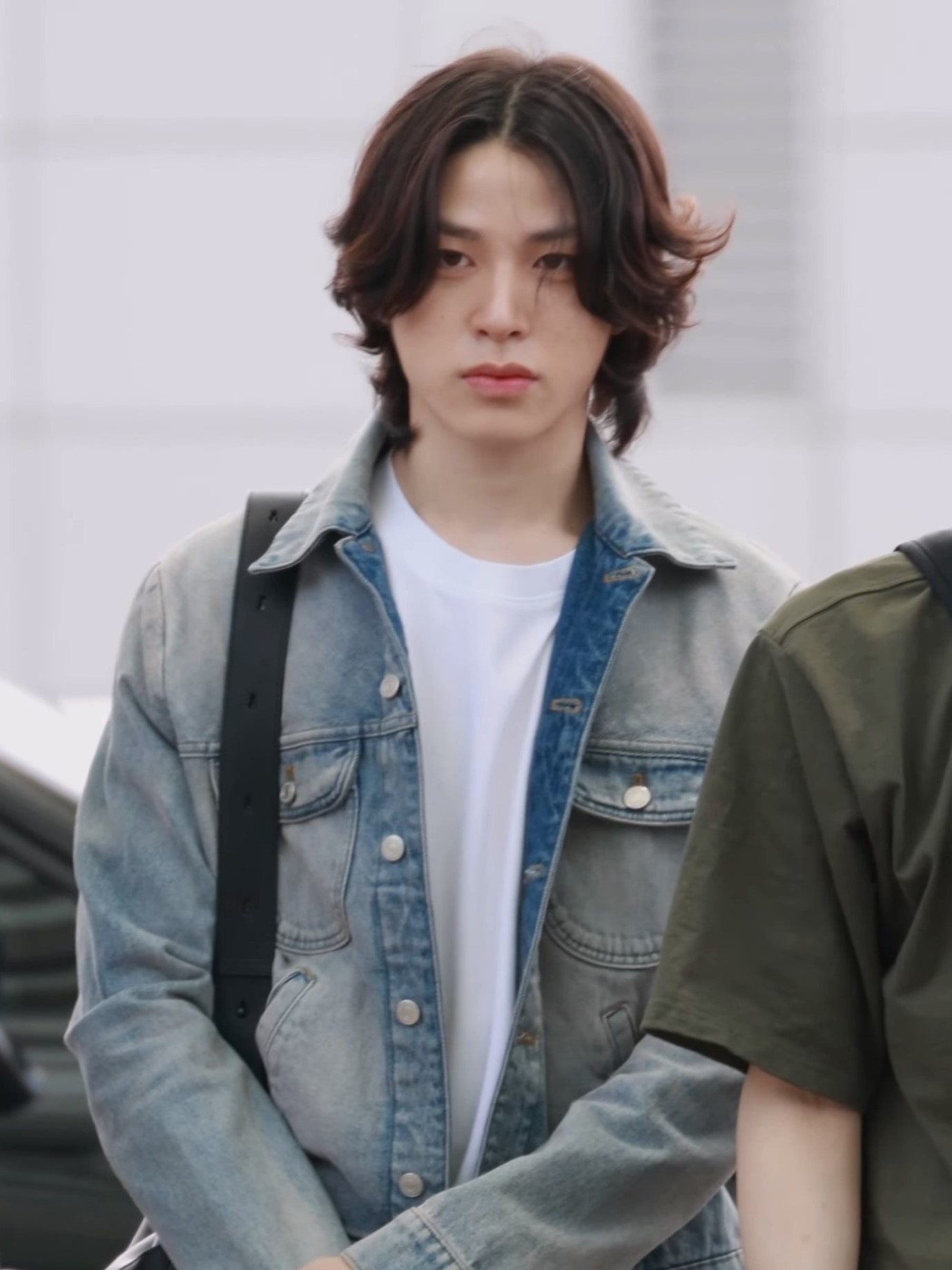
Zerobaseone's Park Gun-wook (left,), Treasure's So Jung-hwan (center) and KickFlip's Kye-hoon (right) host the show as of March 12, 2026
- Leeteuk and Shindong, with Kangin (November 2005 – August 2007) (Note: The exact start date for Leeteuk, Shindong, and Kangin is not mentioned by any source, only the month. Neither is the last date for Kangin mentioned, only the month he left.)
- Leeteuk, Shindong, and Eunhyuk (August 16, 2007 – March 27, 2008)
- 2PM's Nichkhun, Junho, and Chansung, 2AM's Jo Kwon and Jung Jin-woon, CNBLUE's Kang Min-hyuk, and MBLAQ's Lee Joon and G.O (February 18, 2010–??, 2010)
- Tony Ahn and Shin So-yul (March 10, 2011 – August 23, 2012)
- Lee Hong-gi (August 30, 2012 – December 13, 2012)
- Kim Woo-bin (August 15, 2013 – February 13, 2014)
- Ahn Jae-hyun and Jung Joon-young (February 27, 2014 – November 20, 2014)
- Lee Jung-shin, Key, BamBam and Park Jin-young (March 19, 2015 – March 3, 2016)
- Lee Jung-shin and Key (March 17, 2016 – September 8, 2016)
- Key (September 22, 2016 – April 13, 2017)
- Daehwi and Han Hyun-min (April 4, 2019 – February 4, 2021)
- Miyeon and Nam Yoon-su (February 18, 2021 – January 19, 2023)
- Miyeon (January 26 – February 16, 2023)
- Miyeon and Joohoney (February 23, 2023 – July 20, 2023)
- Miyeon (July 27 – August 31, 2023)
- Miyeon and Sung Han-bin (September 7, 2023 – November 16, 2023)
- Sung Han-bin (November 23, 2023 – January 4, 2024)
- Sung Han-bin, Sohee, and Myung Jae-hyun (January 11, 2024 – February 27, 2025)
- Sung Han-bin and Myung Jae-hyun (March 6, 2025 – September 4, 2025)
- Park Gun-wook, So Jung-hwan and Kye-hoon (March 12, 2026 – present)

In February 2010, Mnet announced a new group of eight emcees, comprising select members from 2PM, 2AM, CNBLUE, and MBLAQ. Nicknamed "MCD GUYZ", they hosted the show in subgroups of three or four at a time. This marked the first time M Countdown deviated from its tradition of having 1–2 fixed presenters.

Following Key's departure as host on April 13, 2017, M Countdown announced the implementation of a "special MC system" of guest presenters since a permanent replacement had not yet been decided. The first "new" hosts selected were girl group singers Hani from EXID, and Kyulkyung and Nayoung from Pristin—they appeared on the April 20 broadcast.

Between April 2018 and March 2019, the show was hosted by a "Global MC Crew" of idols who spoke various foreign languages.

== M Countdown chart ==
Chart rankings are calculated by combining the following for a total of 12,000 points:

- Digital music sales from Circle (60%)
- Social media points from YouTube and short form content from various platforms. (10%)
- Album sales data from Circle (15%)
- Global fan votes via Mnet Plus (15%)
- Mnet broadcast points (10%)
- Live-vote (10%; first-place nominees only)

Data is collected from Monday to Sunday.

Songs can win a maximum of three times before being removed from the chart.

Girls' Generation was the only act to achieve the perfect score of 10,000 points under the fourth and fifth scoring systems. Since then, only Exo, BTS, Shinee, Twice, and NU'EST have achieved the perfect score of 11,000 points.

=== Winners ===
While previous revisions of this article included winners from 2004 to 2007, that information was not supported by any secondary sources since its initial addition in 2011. A lack of media coverage of the show on Naver for those particular years makes sourcing the information difficult. As such, those sections have been removed from the page and only winners from 2008 to present are cited.

- 2008
- 2009
- 2010
- 2011
- 2012
- 2013
- 2014
- 2015
- 2016
- 2017
- 2018
- 2019
- 2020
- 2021
- 2022
- 2023
- 2024
- 2025
- 2026

=== Triple crowns ===
The term triple crown refers to when a song achieves three wins on the show. After that, it becomes ineligible for first place and is removed from the chart. The following is a list of all songs that have achieved a triple crown on M Countdown from 2008 to present.

List of Triple Crown winners

Artist	Song	Wins
2008
MC Mong	"Circus"	May 8, May 22, June 12
Taeyang	"Look Only At Me"	June 19, June 26, July 3
Wonder Girls	"So Hot"	July 10, July 17, July 24
Lee Hyori	"U-Go-Girl"	July 31, August 14, August 21
BigBang	"Haru Haru"	August 28, September 4, September 11
TVXQ	"Mirotic"	October 9, October 23, October 30
2009
Seungri	"Strong Baby"	January 22, February 5, February 19
Kara	"Honey"	March 5, March 12, March 26
2PM	"Again & Again"	May 7, May 14, May 21
2PM	"I Hate You"	July 2, July 9, July 16
2NE1	"I Don't Care"	July 23, August 6, August 13
G-Dragon	"Heartbreaker"	September 10, September 17, September 24
2010
2PM	"Without U"	April 29, May 6, May 13
2NE1	"Can't Nobody"	September 23, September 30, October 7
Girls' Generation	"Hoot"	November 18, November 25, December 2
2011
Seungri	"What Can I Do"	January 27, February 3, February 10
BigBang	"Tonight"	March 3, March 10, March 17
CNBLUE	"Intuition"	March 31, April 7, April 14
f(x)	"Pinocchio (Danger)"	May 5, May 12, May 19
Beast	"Fiction"	May 26, June 2, June 9
Super Junior	"Mr. Simple"	August 11, August 18, August 25
Girls' Generation	"The Boys"	October 27, November 3, November 10
Trouble Maker	"Trouble Maker"	December 15, December 22, December 29
2012
Girls' Generation-TTS	"Twinkle"	May 10, May 17, May 24
Infinite	"The Chaser"	May 31, June 7, June 14
f(x)	"Electric Shock"	June 21, June 28, July 5
Super Junior	"Sexy, Free & Single"	July 12, July 19, July 26
Beast	"Beautiful Night"	August 2, August 9, August 16
Psy	"Gangnam Style"	August 23, August 30, September 6
G-Dragon	"Crayon"	September 27, October 4, October 11
Lee Hi	"1,2,3,4"	November 8, November 15, November 22
Lee Seung-gi	"Return"	November 29, December 6, December 13
2013
Yang Yo-seob	"Caffeine"	December 20, December 27, January 3
Girls' Generation	"I Got a Boy"	January 10, January 17, January 24
Sistar19	"Gone Not Around Any Longer"	February 7, February 14, February 21
Shinee	"Dream Girl"	February 28, March 7, March 14
Psy	"Gentleman"	April 18, April 25, May 2
Shinhwa	"This Love"	May 23, May 30, June 6
Sistar	"Give It To Me"	June 20, June 27, July 4
Exo	"Growl"	August 22, August 29, September 5
2014
Exo	"Miracles in December"	December 19, December 26, January 2
TVXQ	"Something"	January 16, January 23, January 30
Akdong Musician	"200%"	April 17, April 24, May 1
Taeyang	"Eyes, Nose, Lips"	June 12, June 19, July 3
Winner	"Empty"	August 21, August 28, September 18
Epik High	"Happen Ending"	October 30, November 6, November 13
2015
Shinhwa	"Sniper"	March 12, March 19, March 26
Exo	"Call Me Baby"	April 9, April 16, April 30
Girls' Generation	"Lion Heart"	August 27, September 3, September 10
Taeyeon	"I"	October 15, October 22, October 29
2016
Psy	"Daddy"	December 17, December 24, January 7
iKon	"Dumb & Dumber"	January 14, January 21, January 28
GFriend	"Rough"	February 4, February 11, February 18
Twice	"Cheer Up"	May 5, May 19, May 26
Exo	"Monster"	June 16, June 23, June 30
GFriend	"Navillera"	July 21, July 28, August 4
2017
BigBang	"Fxxk It"	December 22, January 5, January 12
Mamamoo	"Yes I Am"	June 29, July 6, July 13
Exo	"Ko Ko Bop"	July 27, August 3, August 10
Wanna One	"Energetic"	August 17, August 24, August 31
2018
iKon	"Love Scenario"	February 1, March 1, March 8
Blackpink	"Ddu-Du Ddu-Du"	June 28, July 5, July 12
2019
Seventeen	"Home"	January 31, February 7, February 14
X1	"Flash"	September 5, September 12, September 19
2020
Itzy	"Wannabe"	March 19, March 26, April 2
Itzy	"Not Shy"	September 3, September 10, September 17
2021
(G)I-dle	"Hwaa"	January 21, January 28, February 4
NCT Dream	"Hot Sauce"	May 20, May 27, June 3
NCT 127	"Sticker"	September 23, September 30, October 7
2022
BigBang	"Still Life"	April 14, April 21, April 28
BTS	"Yet to Come"	June 16, June 23, June 30
Blackpink	"Pink Venom"	August 25, September 1, September 8
Blackpink	"Shut Down"	September 22, September 29, October 6
2023
BSS (feat. Lee Young-ji)	"Fighting"	February 16, February 23, March 2
BTS	"Take Two"	June 22, June 29, July 6
Jung Kook (feat. Latto)	"Seven"	July 20, July 27, August 3
V	"Love Me Again"	August 24, August 31, September 7
V	"Slow Dancing"	September 14, September 21, September 28
Jung Kook (feat. Jack Harlow)	"3D"	October 5, October 12, October 19
2024
(G)I-dle	"Super Lady"	February 8, February 15, February 22
Le Sserafim	"Easy"	February 29, March 7, March 14
Aespa	"Armageddon"	June 6, June 13, June 20
Le Sserafim	"Crazy"	September 12, September 19, September 26
2025
Ive	"Rebel Heart"	January 23, January 30, February 6
Jennie	"Like Jennie"	March 20, March 27, April 3
Blackpink	"Jump"	July 17, July 24, July 31
Aespa	"Rich Man"	September 18, September 25, October 2
2026
BTS	"Swim"	March 26, April 2, April 9
Cortis	"RedRed"	April 30, May 7, May 14

== Achievements by artists ==
Most No. 1 winners

Most No. 1 winners

Rank	Artist	Count
1st	Twice	25
2nd	Big Bang	24
3rd	Exo	20
4th	BTS	19
5th	Girls' Generation	18
6th	Red Velvet	17
6th	Blackpink	17
7th	Seventeen	
8th	2NE1	15
8th	(G)I-dle	15
9th	2PM	14
9th	Beast/Highlight	14
9th	Itzy	14

Most Triple Crowns

Most Triple Crowns

Rank	Artist	Count
1st	Exo	5 songs
2nd	Big Bang	4 songs
2nd	Blackpink	4 songs
3rd	2PM	3 songs
3rd	Girls' Generation	3 songs
3rd	Psy	3 songs
3rd	BTS	3 songs
4th	2NE1	2 songs
4th	G-Dragon	2 songs
4th	f(x)	2 songs
4th	Super Junior	2 songs
4th	Beast/Highlight	2 songs
4th	TVXQ	2 songs
4th	Taeyang	2 songs
4th	Shinhwa	2 songs
4th	GFriend	2 songs
4th	iKon	2 songs
4th	Itzy	2 songs
4th	V	2 songs
4th	Jung Kook	2 songs
4th	(G)I-dle	2 songs
4th	Le Sserafim	2 songs

Top 10 Highest Scores (1st–6th System)

Top 10 Highest Scores (1st–6th System) July 29, 2004 – March 3, 2011

Rank	Artist	Song	Score	Date
1st	2NE1	"I Don't Care"	981.3	August 13, 2009
2nd	2NE1	"I Don't Care"	979.8	August 6, 2009
3rd	2NE1	"I Don't Care"	977.9	July 23, 2009
4th	2AM	"Can't Let You Go Even If I Die"	976	February 25, 2010
5th	G-Dragon	"Heartbreaker"	975.7	September 24, 2009
6th	2PM	"Again & Again"	975	May 21, 2009
7th	G-Dragon	"Heartbreaker"	974.5	September 17, 2009
8th	2PM	"Again & Again"	973.4	May 14, 2009
9th	G-Dragon	"Heartbreaker"	973.2	September 10, 2009
10th	Shinee	"Ring Ding Dong"	972.6	November 5, 2009

Top 10 Highest Scores (7th–8th System)

Top 10 Highest Scores (7th–8th System) March 10, 2011 – August 23, 2012

Scoring 7th System: Digital Single Sales (40%), Album Sales (10%), Asia/Global Fan Vote (15%), Preferences of Music Experts (10%), Real-Time Charts (15%), SMS Vote (10%)

Scoring 8th System: Digital Single Sales (45%), Album Sales (10%), Global Fan Vote (15%), Mnet Broadcasting (5%), Preferences of Music Experts (10%), Real-Time Charts (5%), SMS Vote (10%)

Rank	Artist	Song	Score	Date
1st	CNBLUE	"Intuition"	9,654	April 7, 2011
2nd	Girls' Generation-TTS	"Twinkle"	9,357	May 17, 2012
3rd	Girls' Generation-TTS	"Twinkle"	9,355	May 10, 2012
4th	Kara	"Step"	9,314	September 22, 2011
5th	f(x)	"Electric Shock"	9,296	June 21, 2012
6th	Wonder Girls	"Be My Baby"	9,290	November 17, 2011
7th	CNBLUE	"Intuition"	9,255	March 31, 2011
8th	Beast	"Fiction"	9,253	June 2, 2011
9th	Big Bang	"Fantastic Baby"	9,204	March 22, 2012
10th	Beast	"Fiction"	9,191	June 9, 2011

Top 10 Highest Scores (9th–10th System)

Top 10 Highest Scores (9th–10th System) August 30, 2012 – February 20, 2014

Scoring System: Digital Single Sales (50%), Album Sales (10%), Age Preference (20%), Global Fan Vote (5%), Live Show Preferences (10%), SMS Vote (5%)

Rank	Artist	Song	Score	Date
1st	Girls' Generation	"I Got a Boy"	10,000	January 10, 2013
2nd	Girls' Generation	"I Got a Boy"	9,988	January 17, 2013
3rd	Yang Yo-seob	"Caffeine"	9,795	January 3, 2013
4th	Sistar19	"Gone Not Around Any Longer"	9,642	February 14, 2013
5th	Shinee	"Dream Girl"	9,459	March 7, 2013
6th	Busker Busker	"Love, at first"	9,419	October 3, 2013
7th	Busker Busker	"Love, at first"	9,415	October 10, 2013
8th	Yang Yo-seob	"Caffeine"	9,267	December 20, 2012
9th	TVXQ	"Something"	9,244	January 16, 2014
10th	Shinee	"Dream Girl"	9,168	February 28, 2013

Top 10 Highest Scores (11th–12th System)

Top 10 Highest Scores (11th–12th System) February 27, 2014 – June 4, 2015

Scoring System: Digital Single Sales (50%), Album Sales (10%), Social Media Points (10%: YouTube official music video views + SNS buzz), Preference Points (10%: global fan votes + age range preference), Mnet Broadcast Points (10%), SMS Votes (10%)

Rank	Artist	Song	Score	Date
1st	Girls' Generation	"Mr.Mr."	10,000	March 13, 2014
2nd	f(x)	"Red Light"	9,772	July 17, 2014
3rd	Shinee	"View"	9,762	June 4, 2015
4th	Exo	"Overdose"	9,706	May 15, 2014
5th	Big Bang	"Loser"	9,669	May 14, 2015
6th	Apink	"Mr. Chu (On Stage)"	9,577	May 8, 2014
7th	Girls' Generation	"Mr.Mr."	9,363	March 6, 2014
8th	Taeyang	"Eyes, Nose, Lips"	9,255	June 19, 2014
9th	Shinee	"View"	9,037	May 28, 2015
10th	2NE1	"Come Back Home"	8,869	March 20, 2014

Top 10 Highest Scores (13th–15th System)

Top 10 Highest Scores (13th–15th System) June 11, 2015 – April 12, 2018

Scoring System: Digital Music Sales (50%), Album Sales (15%), Social Media Score (15%: YouTube official music video views + SNS buzz), Popularity Score (10%: global fan votes + age range preference), Mnet Broadcast Score (10%) + SMS Voting Score (10%)

Rank	Artist	Song	Score	Date
1st	Exo	"Power"	11,000	September 14, 2017
1st	BTS	"DNA"	11,000	September 28, 2017
2nd	Girls' Generation	"Lion Heart"	10,988	September 3, 2015
3rd	Girls' Generation	"Lion Heart"	10,961	September 10, 2015
4th	Taeyeon	"I"	10,929	October 15, 2015
5th	Red Velvet	"Rookie"	10,903	February 16, 2017
6th	Red Velvet	"Red Flavor"	10,877	July 20, 2017
7th	Exo	"Monster"	10,849	June 23, 2016
8th	Wanna One	"Energetic"	10,844	August 24, 2017
9th	Wanna One	"Boomerang"	10,805	March 29, 2018
10th	Twice	"Heart Shaker"	10,776	December 21, 2017

Top 10 Highest Scores (16th–18th System)

Top 10 Highest Scores (16th–18th System) April 26, 2018 – May 21, 2020

Scoring System: Digital Music Sales (45%), Album Sales (15%), Social Media Score (20%: YouTube official music video views + SNS buzz), Global Fan Votes (10%), Mnet Broadcast Score (10%), SMS Live Vote (10%)

Rank	Artist	Song	Score	Date
1st	BTS	"Fake Love"	11,000	May 31, 2018
1st	Shinee	"I Want You"	11,000	June 21, 2018
1st	BTS	"Boy with Luv"	11,000	April 25, 2019
1st	Twice	"Fancy"	11,000	May 2, 2019
1st	NU'EST	"Bet Bet"	11,000	May 9, 2019
1st	BTS	"On"	11,000	March 5, 2020
1st	NU'EST	"I'm in Trouble"	11,000	May 21, 2020
2nd	X1	"Flash"	10,945	September 19, 2019
3rd	Twice	"Dance the Night Away"	10,933	July 19, 2018
4th	Iz*One	"Fiesta"	10,914	February 27, 2020

Top 10 Highest Scores (19th–20th System)

Top 10 Highest Scores (19th–20th System) May 28, 2020 – April 7, 2022

Scoring System: Digital Sales (45%: Melon, Genie, FLO), Album Sales (15%), Social Media (15%: YouTube MV views), Global Fan Vote (15%), Mnet Broadcast (10%: Mnet TV, MCD Stage, M2 Contents), Live Vote (10%: first-place nominees only)

Rank	Artist	Song	Score	Date
1st	Shinee	"Don't Call Me"	10,990	March 4, 2021
2nd	NCT Dream	"Hot Sauce"	10,800	May 20, 2021
3rd	Seventeen	"Left & Right"	10,705	July 2, 2020
4th	Twice	"Alcohol-Free"	10,123	June 17, 2021
5th	NCT 127	"Punch"	9,778	May 28, 2020
6th	Taeyeon	"INVU"	9,676	February 24, 2022
7th	(G)I-dle	"Hwaa"	9,594	January 21, 2021
8th	Stray Kids	"Thunderous"	9,421	September 9, 2021
9th	Iz*One	"Panorama"	9,364	December 17, 2020
10th	Twice	"More & More"	9,356	June 11, 2020

Top 10 Highest Scores (21st–22nd System)

Top 10 Highest Scores (21st–22nd System) April 14, 2022 – January 4, 2024

Scoring System: Digital Sales (50%), Album Sales (15%), Social Media (10%), Global Fan Vote (15%), Mnet Broadcast (10%), Live Vote (10%)

Rank	Artist	Song	Score	Date
1st	BTS	"Yet to Come"	11,000	June 23, 2022
2nd	Stray Kids	"Case 143"	10,756	October 20, 2022
3rd	BSS	"Fighting"	10,669	February 16, 2023
4th	Seventeen	"_World"	10,633	July 28, 2022
5th	BTS	"Yet to Come"	10,333	June 16, 2022
6th	Jimin	"Like Crazy"	9,855	March 30, 2023
7th	Jung Kook	"Standing Next to You"	9,622	November 9, 2023
8th	Seventeen	"Super"	9,603	May 4, 2023
9th	V	"Slow Dancing"	9,557	September 14, 2023
10th	Tomorrow X Together	"Sugar Rush Ride"	9,489	February 9, 2023

Top 10 Highest Scores (Current System)

Top 10 Highest Scores (Current System) January 11, 2024–present

Scoring System: Digital Sales (60%), Album Sales (15%), Global Social Media Buzz (15%), Global Fan Vote (10%), Mnet Broadcast (10%), Live Vote (10%)

Rank	Artist	Song	Score	Date
1st	Tomorrow X Together	"Stick With You"	10,700	April 23, 2026
2nd	Seventeen	"Thunder"	10,567	June 5, 2025
3rd	Nmixx	"See That?"	10,293	August 29, 2024
4th	BTS	"Swim"	10,167	March 26, 2026
5th	BTS	"Swim"	10,150	April 2, 2026
6th	BTS	"Swim"	10,052	April 9, 2026
7th	Stray Kids	"Ceremony"	10,000	August 28, 2025
8th	Nmixx	"Blue Valentine"	9,958	October 23, 2025
9th	Fromis 9	"Supersonic"	9,953	August 22, 2024
10th	Babymonster	"We Go Up"	9,773	October 16, 2025

Top 10 Highest Scores (All Time)

Top 10 Highest Scores (All Time)

Artist	Song	Score	Date
Exo	"Power"	11,000	September 14, 2017
BTS	"DNA"	11,000	September 28, 2017
BTS	"Fake Love"	11,000	May 31, 2018
Shinee	"I Want You"	11,000	June 21, 2018
BTS	"Boy with Luv"	11,000	April 25, 2019
Twice	"Fancy"	11,000	May 2, 2019
NU'EST	"Bet Bet"	11,000	May 9, 2019
BTS	"On"	11,000	March 5, 2020
NU'EST	"I'm in Trouble"	11,000	May 21, 2020
BTS	"Yet to Come"	11,000	June 23, 2022

== International versions ==
Country	Local Name	Network	Year Aired
Thailand	Thailand Music Countdown	Channel 3	May 12, 2024 – present
Vietnam	Vietnam Music Countdown	FPT Play	Mid 2026 (planned)

== Similar programs ==
- Music Bank
- Show! Music Core
- Inkigayo
- Pops in Seoul
- Simply K-Pop
- Show K-Pop
- Music on Top
- Music Universe K-909
- Show Champion
- The Show

== See also ==
- KCON (music festival)
- Music programs of South Korea
