= Electric Shock (song) =

Single by f(x)

from the EP Electric Shock
- Released: June 10, 2012
- Recorded: 2012
- Genre: Electropop; dance-pop
- Length: 3:15
- Label: SM
- Composers: Joachim Vermeulen Windsant; Maarten ten Hove; Willem Laseroms
- Lyricist: Seo Ji-eum

f(x) singles chronology
"Hot Summer" (2011)	"Electric Shock" (2012)	"Rum Pum Pum Pum" (2013)

Music video
- "Electric Shock" on YouTube

"Electric Shock" is a song from South Korean girl group f(x). It was the lead single of their second extended play, Electric Shock, and was released in conjunction with the EP on June 10, 2012, for digital download and streaming via SM Entertainment. The accompanying music video was posted to SM's YouTube channel soon after the song's release.

Commercially, "Electric Shock" reached the top three on the Gaon Digital Chart, K-pop Hot 100, and US World Digital Songs charts, the first time the group did so on the latter two charts. By the end of 2012, it garnered over 2,150,000 paid downloads in South Korea.

== Composition ==
"Electric Shock" is an artpop and dance-pop song, employing elements of electro house. Lyrically, it is about expressing the feeling of love as an electric shock making the entire set about falling for another person and making a bond.

== Reception ==
"Electric Shock" was ranked among the best K-pop songs of 2012 by Daum Music (4th), Spin (8th), and Popjustice (12th). In a The Dong-a Ilbo survey published in 2016, the song was ranked 6th in a vote of the best female idols songs of the past 20 years by music experts, tied with GFriend's "Rough" and Girls' Generation's "I Got a Boy".

Commercially, "Electric Shock" peaked at number one on the Gaon Digital Chart and the component digital download chart, selling 630,510 paid downloads in its first week. It then fell to number three and received 285,501 downloads the following week. After three weeks on the chart, "Electric Shock" garnered a total of 1,121,472 downloads. It was ranked the 35th best-selling song of 2012 in the country, with a cumulative total of 2,150,840 downloads.

== Music video ==
An official 26-second teaser was released June 8, 2012. Another minute and a half extended teaser was aired on KBS World.The music video was officially released on June 12, 2012. The music video garnered more than one million views in less than a day and over 10 million views in less than a week. On October 16, 2016, the video surpassed 100 million views, making f(x) the 6th K-pop group and 3rd K-pop girl group to join the exclusive "100 million club."

The music video shows f(x) dancing to choreography by Jillian Meyers, who had previously worked with f(x) on their hit single, "Pinocchio (Danger)", and would soon work again with "Rum Pum Pum Pum". It features three sets, one pink set with running neon lights similar to a computer chip, one long white room with large white lights and reflective surfaces, and another white room with floor-to-ceiling windows. A total of 4 different sets of outfits can be seen on all five members. Throughout the video, the camera focuses back and forth between the dance number and close ups of each f(x) girl. In certain shots, each girl can be seen holding a specific electroshock weapon and directing it towards the camera: Krystal and Amber use tasers; Victoria and Luna use a stun baton; and Sulli uses a defibrillator.

== Accolades ==
Awards and nominations
Year	Organization	Award	Result	Ref.
2012	Mnet Asian Music Awards	Song of the Year	Nominated	
2012	Mnet Asian Music Awards	Best Dance Performance – Female Group	Won	
2013	Golden Disc Awards	Digital Bonsang (Main Prize)	Won	
2013	Golden Disc Awards	Digital Daesang	Nominated	
2013	Korean Music Awards	Best Dance & Electronic Song	Won	

Music program awards
Program	Date (9 total)
M Countdown	June 21, 2012
M Countdown	June 28, 2012
M Countdown	July 5, 2012
Music Bank	June 22, 2012
Music Bank	June 29, 2012
Show Champion	June 26, 2012
Show Champion	July 3, 2012
Inkigayo	July 1, 2012
Inkigayo	July 8, 2012

== Charts ==
=== Weekly charts ===
Chart (2012)	Peak position
South Korea (Gaon)	1
South Korea (K-pop Hot 100)	2
US World Digital Songs (Billboard)	3

=== Year-end charts ===
Chart (2012)	Position
South Korea (Gaon)	29
South Korea (K-pop Hot 100)	36
US World Digital Songs (Billboard)	22

== Credits ==
Credits adapted from EP's liner notes.

=== Studio ===
- Ingrid Studio – recording, digital editing
- SM Concert Hall Studio – mixing
- Sonic Korea – mastering

=== Personnel ===
- SM Entertainment – executive producer
- Lee Soo-man – producer
- f(x) – vocals, background vocals
- Joachim Vermeulen Windsant – composition, arrangement
- Maarten ten Hove – composition, arrangement
- Willem Laseroms – composition, arrangement
- Seo Ji-eum – lyrics
- Misfit – vocal directing, background vocals
- Jung Eun-kyung – recording, digital editing
- Kim Ji-eun – recording
- Nam Koong-jin – mixing
- Jeon Hoon – mastering
