= Freekind =

Slovenian musical duo

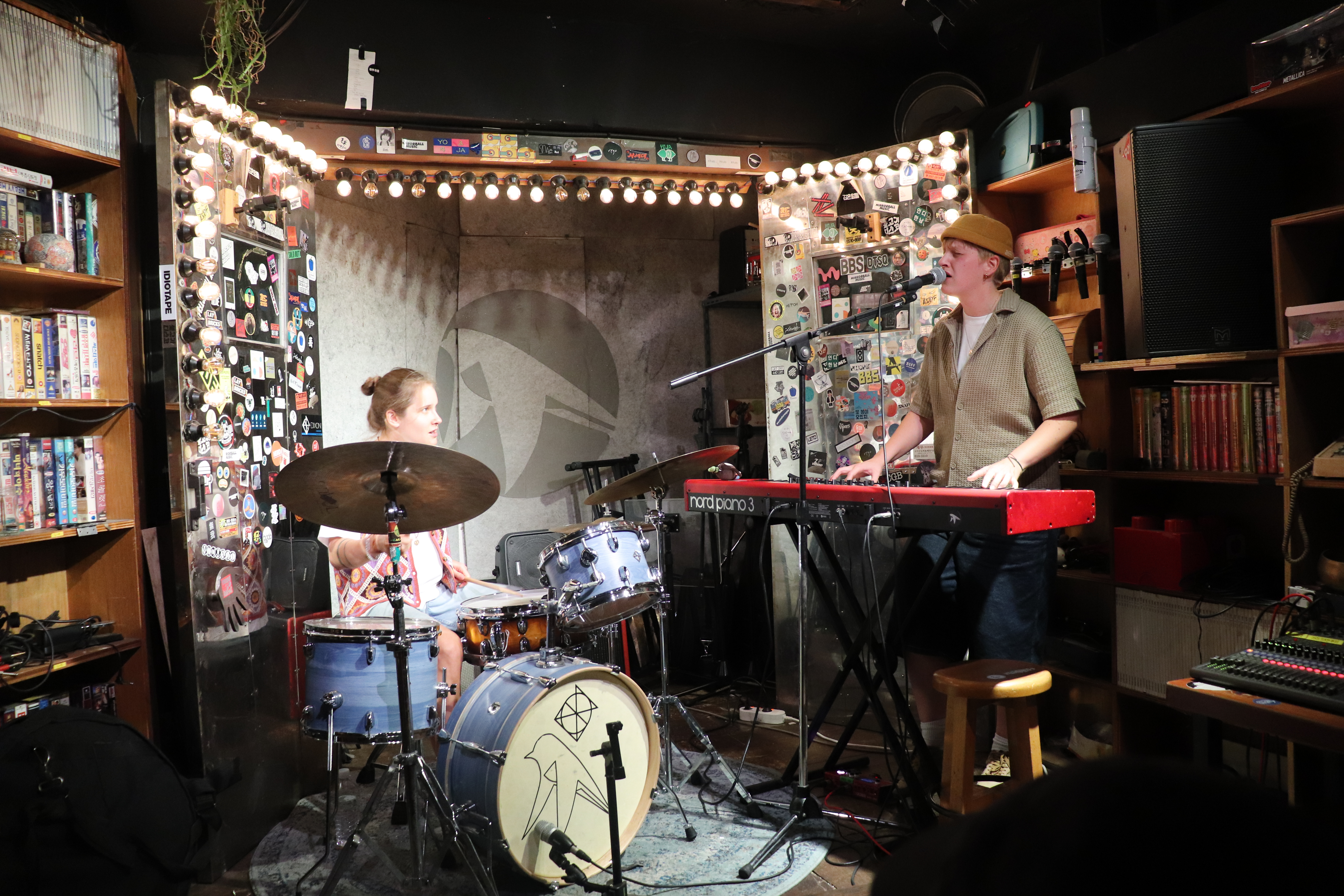
- Freekind in 2025

Background information
- Origin: Graz, Austria
- Genres: R&B; jazz pop
- Years active: 2019-present
- Labels: Butter92
- Members: Nina Korošak-Serčič; Sara Ester Gredelj

Freekind (stylised as freekind.) is a Slovenian R&B musical duo. The band currently consists of Nina Korošak-Serčič and Sara Ester Gredelj. The band was formed in Graz, Austria, Sarah is Croatian and Nina is Slovenian. The group has released a studio album Since Always and Forever (2023).

== Career ==
Nina Korošak-Serčič moved to Austria and began learning jazz drums, where she met Sara Ester Gredelj and formed a group. They released EP Not Good Enough in 2020 and have been based in Ljubljana, Slovenia.

They released their first full album, Since Always and Forever, in 2023. They participated as songwriters on the albums of NewJeans and V of BTS. They were nominated in the same year of Music Moves Europe Award.

== Discography ==
=== Studio albums ===
- Since Always and Forever (2023)

== EPs ==
- Not Good Enough (2020)
