= Boberg =

Boberg is a surname. Notable people with the surname include:

- Anna Boberg (1864–1935), Swedish artist
- Carina Boberg (1952–2020), Swedish actress
- Carl Boberg (1859–1940), Swedish poet and legislator
- Charles Boberg, Canadian linguist
- Einer Boberg (1935–1995), Danish-Canadian speech pathologist
- Ferdinand Boberg (1860–1946), Swedish architect
- Inger Margrethe Boberg (1900–1957), Danish folklore researcher and writer
- Jørgen Boberg (1940–2009), Danish artist
- Oliver Boberg (born 1965), German artist
- Thomas Boberg (born 1960), Danish writer
- Paul Boberg was a South African legal scholar

== Surname ==
- Boberg Hundred, a geographic division in Sweden
