= Parnevik =

Parnevik is a surname. Notable people with the surname include:

- Bosse Parnevik (born 1938), Swedish impersonator, revue artist, and comedian
- Jesper Parnevik (born 1965), Swedish golfer
- Peg Parnevik (born 1995), Swedish singer, songwriter, and television personality

== See also ==
- Parneviks
