= Bengt Bedrup =

Swedish journalist (1928–2005)

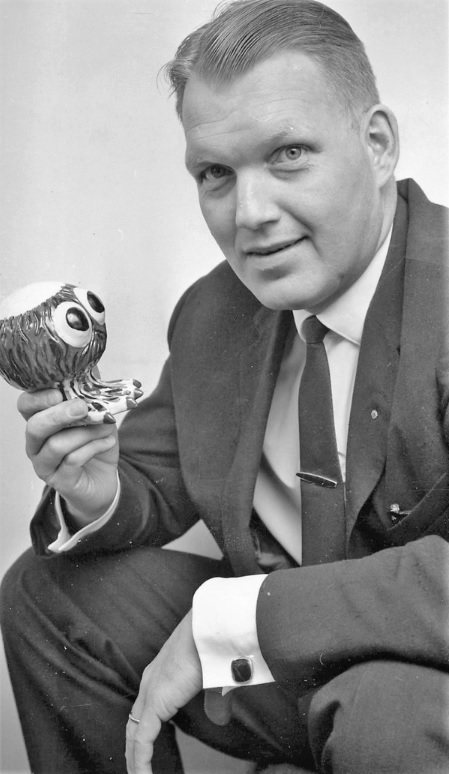
- Bedrup in 1964.
- Born: Bengt Erik Helge Nilsson; 10 June 1928; Stockholm, Sweden
- Died: 27 March 2005 (aged 76); Järfälla, Sweden
- Occupations: Journalist, TV host
- Spouse: Margaretha Ljungman (m. 1950)
- Children: 2

Bengt Erik Helge Bedrup (né Nilsson) (10 June 1928 – 27 March 2005) was a Swedish journalist and television personality.

== Career ==
Bedrup was born on 10 June 1928 at Maria Prästgårdsgata in Södermalm, Stockholm, Sweden, the son of managing director Helge Nilsson and his wife Karin (née Nygren). He attended Viggbyholmsskolan in Viggbyholm in 1945.

== Career ==
Bedrup became at the age of 17 an employee at the newspaper Värmlands-Posten in Kristinehamn in 1945. The year after he came to the newspaper Norra Skåne in Hässleholm and then to Expressen in 1948. Bedrup became employed by the Swedish Radio in 1956 and by the Sveriges Television (SVT) in 1958. During the TV's breakthrough as a medium in the early 1960s, he became nationally famous as a sports journalist. Along with Bengt Grive and Sven "Plex" Pettersson, Bedrup was the first to be hired at SVT's sports editorial office, when it was started in 1960. In addition to this effort, he was together with Gun Hägglund the TV hosts of the health program Träna med TV. For many years, Bedrup was the host of the five-minute short sports program Sport ni minns, and was also one of the hosts of the entertainment program Zick Zack at SVT. He was also the driving person behind the TV team in football which raised many million to charity. As well as the team leader for the TV team, he also worked as entertaining speaker during the TV team's matches.

In 1980, he was interviewed by Lasse Holmqvist in the TV program Här är ditt liv (This Is Your Life), when he was caught off guard when he had thought he would just be a guest when Bosse Parnevik was portrayed, a classic episode in Swedish television history. In this program, his severe alcohol problems were revealed, which later founded his extensive work in these matters, including his TV series about alcoholism, Torra fakta (Dry facts) and Beska droppar (Bitter drops). Bedrup made himself also known as an alcohol informant where he wanted parents to teach their children how to drink properly. He was also a member of the Lions Clubs International and hosted the radio show Sommar in 1992.

== Personal life ==
In 1950 he married Margaretha Ljungman, the daughter of railway official Fredrik Ljungman and his wife. He was the father of Viveca (born 1951) and Mikael (born 1959).

He took the name Bedrup when he started as a reporter at Expressen in Malmö, inspired by his colleague Karl Anders Adrup. His colleague Lennart Carlsson also changed name, to Lennart Cedrup. Bedrup lived in Hässelby Villastad in northwestern Stockholm and had a summer house in Roslagen.

== Death ==
Bedrup died on 27 March 2005. By then, he had been suffering from Parkinson's disease for several years. He lived the last years of his life in a nursing home in Järfälla. Bedrup is buried at Bromma Cemetery.
