= Erik Lewander =

Swedish music producer, songwriter, and composer

Erik Lewander (born 29 May 1974) is a Swedish music producer, songwriter, film composer and mixing engineer based in Stockholm. He is signed to The Kennel (Universal Music Publishing)

== Career ==
With a background as a musician in several bands, Lewander started working as a sound designer at a post production house in Stockholm (Pang Studios). Besides sound designing he also started making music for commercial films. Up to this day he has composed music to several hundred commercials. This led him to writing and producing songs for artists. Lewander has worked with Bonnie Tyler, Ke$ha, Girls' Generation, Audra Mae, Jasmine Thompson, Tina Arena, Cathy Dennis, Vassy, Jessica Sutta, BoA, Sarah Connor, The Potbelleez, F, Tom Andrews, September and Samantha Jade.

In 2010 he co-wrote the song "Manipulated" for the Swedish Melodifestivalen performed by Hanna Lindblad.

In 2013 he was nominated at the Aria Awards, "Best Dance Release" for the song "Saved In A Bottle"

In 2014 he was nominated at the Apra Awards, "Dance Work of the Year" for the song "Saved In A Bottle"

In 2014 he composed music for "Jordskott". A new TV series for SVT. Broadcast start in mid February 2015.

In 2015 he co-wrote the song "I Want Your Love" for the Moldova's entry to Eurovision Song Contest performed by Eduard Romanyuta. I Want Your Love (Eduard Romanyuta song)

In 2015 he co-wrote the song "Building It Up" for Melodifestivalen 2015 performed by JTR.

In 2017 the song Ain't No Saint (song) was nominated in the category "Song Of The Year" at the Swedish Grammy.

In 2018, the score music for Jordskott II gave him a nomination for The Camille Awards - European Film Composer Awards, ECSA. (Prev Grand Score.)

== Selected discography ==
- 2018: Carola Häggkvist – ”Let It In" (Producer, Mixing engineer) single (SWE).
- 2018: Darshan Raval – ”Do Din" (Co-writer, Producer, Mixing engineer) single (INDIA).
- 2018: Akasa – ”Thug Ranjha" (Co-writer, Producer, Mixing engineer) single (INDIA).
- 2018: JLC – ”Hela Vägen Hem" (Co-writer, Producer, Mixing engineer) single (SWE).
- 2017: JLC – ”Borta Bra Men Hemma Fest" (Co-writer, Producer, Mixing engineer) single (SWE).
- 2017: Peg Parnevik – ”Don't Tell Ma (Latin Version)" (Producer, Mixing engineer) single (SWE).
- 2017: Peg Parnevik – ”Got Me Good" (co-writer, producer).
- 2017: Martin Almgren – ”Changing Street" (co-writer).
- 2016: Peg Parnevik – ”New York (Handles Heartbreak Better)" (co-writer, producer) single.
- 2016: Peg Parnevik – ”Sthlm Nights" (co-writer, producer) single.
- 2016: 葉瑋庭( Uni Yeh ) – ”Waiting" (co-writer).
- 2016: Peg Parnevik – ”We Are (Ziggy & Carola)" (co-writer, producer) single.
- 2016: Oscar DiBruzell – ”Minute Of Your Time" (co-writer, producer) single. (SWE)
- 2016: Peg Parnevik – ”Ain't No Saint" (co-writer, producer) single.
- 2015: KB – ”Find A Way" (co-writer, producer) single. (South Africa)
- 2015: Melanie C – ”For Your Eyes Only" (producer) for the RTL James Bond show.
- 2015: Blue (English band) – ”Skyfall" (producer) for the RTL James Bond show.
- 2015: Mandy Capristo – ”Let It Go" (producer) for the RTL Disney show.
- 2015: Bonnie Tyler – ”Circle Of Life" (producer) for the RTL Disney show.
- 2015: Block B (블락비 바스타즈) - Nobody But You (co-writer, producer) (South Korea)
- 2015: Dixiez – ”It's Okay" (co-writer, producer) single (SWE)
- 2015: Moa Gammel – ”Josefins Visa II" (co-writer, producer) single (SWE)
- 2015: Moa Gammel – ”Josefins Visa" (co-writer, producer) single (SWE)
- 2015: Solblomma – ”Lies Passes Your Mind" (co-writer, producer) single (SWE)
- 2015: Ofelia – ”I Will Meet You There” (Theme song for the TV-Show "Jordskott") (co-writer, producer) single (SWE)
- 2015: Eduard Romanyuta – ”I Want Your Love” (co-writer, producer) single
- 2015: JTR (band) – ”Building It Up” (co-writer, producer) single (SWE)
- 2014: Vicci Martinez – ”Otra Cancion” (co-writer, producer) single (US)
- 2014: Lena Katina (former t.A.T.u.) – Who I Am (co-writer, producer) single from the album "This Is Who I Am" (US/Russia)
- 2014: Girls' Generation – My Oh My (co-writer, producer) from the album "The Best" (South Korea)
- 2014: The Fooo Conspiracy – ”Mmm” (co-writer) from the album "Conspiration" (Sweden)
- 2014: Peta & The Wolves – ”Scum” (producer) from the album "Scum" (Australia)
- 2014: Peta & The Wolves – ”Who Killed Love” (producer) from the album "Scum" (Australia)
- 2014: Little Mix – ”Wings, Korean version” (mixing engineer) single (UK)
- 2014: Landy Wen – ”Never Say Never” (co-writer, producer) single from the forthcoming album (Taiwan)
- 2014: Judika - ”Jika Kuharus Pergi” (co-writer, producer) from the album "Hati & Cinta" (Indonesia)
- 2014: Judika - ”Terus Berlari (Oh..oh..oh)” (co-writer, producer) from the album "Hati & Cinta" (Indonesia)
- 2014: Jin-Gui Sheng / 金贵晟 - ”让一切简单” from the forthcoming album (China)
- 2014: Mr.Green - ”Invitation to play” (writer, producer) from the album "Invitation to play"
- 2014: Trick - ”Up All Night” (producer) single (Singapore)
- 2014: SpeXial - ”為愛戰鬥 (Fight for Love)” (co-writer) from the album "Break It Down" (Taiwan)
- 2013: The Potbelleez – ”Saved In A Bottle” (co-writer, producer) single (Australia)
- 2013: f(x) – "Rum Pum Pum Pum" (co-writer, producer) single from the album Pink Tape (South Korea)
- 2013: Girls' Generation – My Oh My (co-writer, producer) single from the album "Love and Peace" (South Korea)
- 2013: Therese Neaime – ”All I Think About Is You" (co-writer, producer) from the album Sandstorm (Sweden)
- 2013: Therese Neaime – ”Heartbeat" (co-writer, producer) from the album Sandstorm (Sweden)
- 2013: Therese Neaime – ”Scorpion" (co-writer, producer) from the album Sandstorm (Sweden)
- 2013: Therese Neaime – ”Short Term Memory" (co-writer, producer) from the album Sandstorm (Sweden)
- 2013: Shawn Li – ” Endless” (co-writer, producer) from the album "Shawn's First Album" (China)
- 2013: Shawn Li – ” Shobi-Dobi Oh-Oh” (co-writer, producer) from the album "Shawn's First Album" (China)
- 2013: Fatin – ”Hold Me” (co-writer, producer) from the album "For You" (Indonesia)
- 2013: Fatin – ”Goodbye” (mixing engineer) from the album "For You" (Indonesia)
- 2013: Fatin – ”Sadar Dibatas Sabar” (mixing engineer) from the album "For You" (Indonesia)
- 2013: Xian Zi – ”2501” (co-writer, producer) from the album "Whats What" (Taiwan)
- 2013: Sanny Alexa – ”Znaya Kak” (co-writer, producer) single
- 2012: Magnus Carlsson – ”Platsen I Mitt Hjärta” (mixing engineer) single (Sweden)
- 2012: Yianna – ”Intervention” (co-writer) single from the album "Intervention" (Australia)
- 2012: Rainbow – ”Energy” (co-writer, producer) from the album "Over The Rainbow" (Japan)
- 2011: Vassy – ”Born This Way” (producer) from the album "The Acoustics, Covers" (US)
- 2011: Vassy – ”Till The End Of The World” (producer) from the album "The Acoustics, Covers" (US)
- 2011: September Petra Marklund – ”Whiteflag” (co-writer, producer) from the album "Love CPR" (Sweden)
- 2011: Therese Neaime – ”All I Think About Is You" (co-writer, producer) single from the album "Stronger" (Sweden)
- 2011: Therese Neaime – ”Short Term Memory" (co-writer, producer) from the album "Stronger" (Sweden)
- 2011: Therese Neaime – ”Heartbeat" (co-writer, producer) from the album "Stronger" (Sweden)
- 2011: Andreas Wistrand – ”Over Now" (co-writer) single (Sweden)
- 2011: Jia Ruhan – ”This Is The Time” (co-writer, producer) from the album "Time To Grow" (China)
- 2011: Jia Ruhan – ”Let's Fly Away” (producer) from the album "Time To Grow" (China)
- 2011: Jia Ruhan – ”Dancing On A Rainbow” (producer) from the album "Time To Grow" (China)
- 2011: Sweetbox – ”Bulletproof” (vocal producer) single from the album "Diamond Veil" (Japan)
- 2011: Sweetbox – ”Remember This Dance” (vocal producer) from the album "Diamond Veil" (Japan)
- 2011: Viktorious - "Save Me From Falling" (co-writer) from the EP "Victorious Weekends" (Sweden)
- 2010: Sarah Connor - "Soldier With A Broken Heart" (co-writer, producer) from the album "Real Love" 2010 (Germany)
- 2010: Sarah Connor - "Faded" (co-writer, producer) B-side from the single "Real Love" 2010 (Germany)
- 2010: Hanna Lindblad - "Manipulated" (co-writer, additional production) single and contestant in "Melodifestivalen" 2010 (Sweden)
- 2010: BoA - Copy & Paste (album) (co-writer, producer) from the album "Copy & Paste" 2010 (South Korea)
- 2010: Emilia de Poret - "Pick Me Up" (producer) single (Captain Crash Remix) (Sweden)
- 2010: Kanjani 8 - ”No-No-No” (co-writer) from the album "Puzzle" (Japan)
- 2010: Dj Dogboy - ”Hey Mr. Dj Reggae” (producer) from the album "Reggae Shower 2" (Japan)
- 2010: Dj Dogboy - ”Holding On To You” (co-writer, producer) from the album "Reggae Shower 2" (Japan)
- 2010: Dj Dogboy - ”Never Stop” (producer) from the album "Reggae Shower 2" (Japan)
- 2010: Dj Dogboy - ”Lovefool” (producer) from the album "Reggae Shower 2" (Japan)
- 2009: Linda Teodosiu - ”Ready To Fly” (producer) from the album "Under Pressure" (Germany)
- 2009: Edmundo - ”So Vou Pensar Em Ti (You)” (co-writer) from the album "Edmundo"
- 2009: Edmundo - ”Nao Estou Afim (Let Me Be The One)” (co-writer) from the album "Edmundo"
- 2009: Linda Andrews - ”Why” (co-writer) from the album "Into the light" (Denmark)
- 2009: Paul Twohill - ”Tell Me” (co-writer, producer) single" (Singapore)
- 2009: Fred Hane - ”Next Time” (co-writer, producer) single" (Sweden)
- 2009: Johanna Siekinnen – ”Don’t Let Go” (co-writer) (Finland)
- 2009: Dj Dogboy - ”Dilemma Reggae (I love you)” (producer) from the album "Reggae Shower" (Japan)
- 2009: Dj Dogboy - ”Don't Lie Reggae” (producer) from the album "Reggae Shower" (Japan)
- 2009: Dj Dogboy - ”Top Of The World Reggae” (producer) from the album "Reggae Shower" (Japan)
- 2009: Dj Dogboy - ”Sexy Love Reggae” (producer) from the album "Reggae Shower" (Japan)
- 2009: Dj Dogboy - ”Umbrella Reggae (I Love Rihanna)” (producer) from the album "Reggae Shower" (Japan)
- 2009: Dj Dogboy - ”Once In A Lifetime Love” (co-writer, producer) from the album "Reggae Shower" (Japan)
- 2009: Dj Dogboy - ”Yesterday” (co-writer, producer) from the album "Reggae Shower" (Japan)
- 2009: Dj Dogboy - ”Carnival Reggae” (producer) from the album "Reggae Shower" (Japan)
- 2009: Dj Dogboy - ”Breakout Reggae” (producer) from the album "Reggae Shower" (Japan)
- 2009: Dj Dogboy - ”Miss Independent Reggae” (producer) from the album "Reggae Shower" (Japan)
- 2009: Dj Dogboy - ”Just Dance” (producer) from the album "Reggae Shower" (Japan)
- 2009: Regga-Enka - ”Northern Bar, Kita Sakaba” (producer) from the album "Regga-Enka All Stars" (Japan)
- 2009: Regga-Enka - ”Third Year Love Affair” (producer) from the album "Regga-Enka All Stars" (Japan)
- 2008: Peter Lundblad - "Julgryning Vaknar" (co-writer, producer) Single (Sweden)
- 2008: Paul Twohill - "Here I Am" (co-writer, producer) Single (Singapore)
- 2008: John Klass - "I’m Your Preacher" (co-writer, producer) Single (Singapore)
- 2008: Chris Lindh & Camp Sweden - "Heja Sverige" (mixing engineer) unofficial theme for European Championship Football 2008 (Sweden)
- 2008: Nathalie - "Here With Me" (co-writer, producer) single from the album "Here With Me" (Sweden)
- 2008: Nathalie - "Two Weeks Notice" (co-writer, producer) from the album "Here With Me" (Sweden)
- 2008: Nathalie - "Come What May" (co-writer, producer) from the album "Here With Me" (Sweden)
- 2008: Nathalie - "Silent Room" (co-writer, producer) from the album "Here With Me" (Sweden)
- 2008: Nathalie - "Mama" (producer) from the album "Here With Me" (Sweden)
- 2008: Kirsten Gundersen - "Live A Lie" (co-writer, producer) from the album "Beautiful Contradiction" (UK)
- 2008: Kirsten Gundersen - "You Say" (co-writer, producer) from the album "Beautiful Contradiction" (UK)
