= Iggy Strange Dahl =

Swedish songwriter

Iggy Strange Dahl is a Swedish songwriter based in Stockholm, Sweden.

He has written songs for major recording artists such as September, Lena Katina (Former member of t.A.T.u.), Sweetbox, F(x), Arashi, Jolin Tsai, Super Junior Donghae & Eunhyuk, and Elliott Murphy, and he has received several awards and top positions on music charts in South Korea, Japan, Taiwan, Indonesia, China and Sweden. In 2010 he co-wrote the song "Manipulated" for the Swedish entry to Eurovision Song Contest (Melodifestivalen) performed by Hanna Lindblad. In Melodifestivalen 2015 he competed again, this time performing with the band JTR and the song "Building It Up", which reached the final. Together with Erik Lewander and Olle Ljungman he has composed music for the Swedish TV-series Jordskott.

== Tracklist / releases ==
- 2024: Iggy Strange Dahl - "Jag Är Jag" single (Sweden)
- 2024: Iggy Strange Dahl - "Du Kommer Väl Ut" single (Sweden)
- 2021: Stockholm Noir - "Baboushka's Lullaby" from the soundtrack of the Radio-series "Djupet" (Sweden)
- 2020: Elva Hsiao - "Soldier" single (Taiwan)
- 2020: Bryant Chang - "Fighting" single (Taiwan)
- 2019: Jay Drew - "Wish On Christmas Day" single (US)
- 2018: Caesar Wu, Darren Chen, Dylan Wang, Leon Leong - "Cong Lai Mei Xiang Dao” from the soundtrack of the TV-series Meteor Garden (Taiwan)
- 2018: Olivia Eliasson - "Liar" single (Sweden)
- 2017: Li Xiao-Lu - "High High High" single (China)
- 2016: Soulvibe - "Fire To The Floor" single from the forthcoming album (Indonesia)
- 2016: Sezairi - "Fire To The Floor" single from the forthcoming album (Singapore)
- 2016: Nathalie Saba - "Young Hearts" single from the forthcoming album (Middle East)
- 2016: Uni Yeh - "Waiting" single from the forthcoming album (Taiwan)
- 2016: Uni Yeh - "少在那邊" single from the forthcoming album (Taiwan)
- 2015: JTR - "Building It Up" single and finalist in Melodifestivalen 2015 (Sweden)
- 2015: Jordskott/Ofelia - "I Will Meet You There" from the soundtrack of the TV-series Jordskott (Sweden)
- 2015: Jordskott/Ofelia - "Criminal” from the soundtrack of the TV-series Jordskott (Sweden)
- 2015: Jordskott/Moa Gammel - "Josefins Visa" from the soundtrack of the TV-series Jordskott (Sweden)
- 2015: Jordskott/Solblomma - "Lies Passes Your Mind" from the soundtrack of the TV-series Jordskott (Sweden)
- 2015: Jordskott/Dixiez - "It's Okay" from the soundtrack of the TV-series Jordskott (Sweden)
- 2015: Jordskott/Hans Mosesson - "Jag är jag” from the soundtrack of the TV-series Jordskott (Sweden)
- 2015: Fatin – "Away" single from the forthcoming album (Indonesia)
- 2015: Movie Theme – "Away" from the soundtrack of Dreams (Indonesia)
- 2015: Gamaliel Audrey Cantika - "Bahagia" from the album Stronger (Indonesia)
- 2015: Gamaliel Audrey Cantika - "Goo" from the album Stronger (Indonesia)
- 2015: Rio Febria - "Run Away" from the album Love Is (Indonesia)
- 2015: Rio Febrian – "Rasa Sesungguhnya" from the album Love Is (Indonesia)
- 2015: Rio Febrian - "Kamu" from the album Love Is (Indonesia)
- 2015: Rio Febrian – "Terakhir Dihati" from the album Love Is (Indonesia)
- 2014: Jolin Tsai & Namie Amuro (Duet) - "I'm Not Yours" single from the album Play (Taiwan/Japan)
- 2014: Jolin Tsai - "Miss Trouble" from the album Play (Taiwan)
- 2014: Jolin Tsai - "We're All Different, Yet The Same" from the album Play (Taiwan)
- 2014: Lena Katina (former t.A.T.u.) – "Who I Am" single from the album This Is Who I Am (US/Russia)
- 2014: Super Junior Donghae & Eunhyuk – "Skeleton" single from the forthcoming album (Japan)
- 2014: Angela Chang – "Live For Love" single from the forthcoming album (Taiwan)
- 2014: Landy Wen – "Never Say Never" single from the forthcoming album (Taiwan)
- 2014: Bonnie Loo – "Y.O.L.O." single from the album Bonnie 羅美儀 (Singapore)
- 2014: Judika - "Sampai Kau Jadi Milikku" single from the album Hati & Cinta (Indonesia)
- 2014: Judika - "Strong Together" from the album Hati & Cinta (Indonesia)
- 2014: Judika - "Jika Kuharus Pergi" from the album Hati & Cinta (Indonesia)
- 2014: Gita Gutawa – "Not Me It's You! from the album The Next Chapter (Indonesia)
- 2014: Gita Gutawa – "Sunshine After Rain" single from the album The Next Chapter (Indonesia)
- 2014: Gita Gutawa - "Karenamu Bukan Aku" from the album The Next Chapter (Indonesia)
- 2014: GAC/Gamaliel, Audrey, Cantika – "Bahagia" single from the forthcoming album (Indonesia)
- 2014: Jin-Gui Sheng / 金贵晟]] - "让一切简单" from the forthcoming album (China)
- 2013: Arashi – "Full of Love" B-side on the single "Calling / Breathless" (Japan)
- 2013: f(x) – "Rum Pum Pum Pum" single from the album Pink Tape (South Korea)
- 2013: Fatin – "Hold Me" from the album For You (Indonesia)
- 2013: John Park – "Imagine" single from the album Inner Child (South Korea)
- 2013: Shawn Li – "Qi Fei" from the album Shawn's First Album (China)
- 2013: Shawn Li – "Ai Shi Mei Zhong Dian De Lv Xing" from the album Shawn's First Album (China)
- 2013: Therése Neaimé – "Scorpion" from the album Sandstorm (Sweden)
- 2013: Therése Neaimé – "Heartbeat" from the album Sandstorm (Sweden)
- 2012: Jolin Tsai - "Dr. Jolin" from the album Muse (Taiwan)
- 2012: Elva Hsiao – "Super Girl" single from the album Super Girl (Taiwan)
- 2012: Playzone ’12 (musical) – "March!" from the album Playzone '12 (Japan)
- 2012: Ola Lustig & Camp Sweden - "Kämpa Gul & Blå" unofficial theme for European Championship Football 2012 (Sweden)
- 2011: September – "Whiteflag" from the album Love CPR (Sweden)
- 2011: Viktorious - "Save Me From Falling" from the EP Victorious Weekends (Sweden)
- 2011: Sweetbox – "Bulletproof" single from the album Diamond Veil (Japan)
- 2011: Sweetbox – "Echo" from the album Diamond Veil (Japan)
- 2011: Sweetbox – "I Know You’re Not Alone" single from the album Diamond Veil (Japan)
- 2011: Sweetbox – "Remember This Dance" from the album Diamond Veil (Japan)
- 2011: Sweetbox – "Indestructible" single from the album Diamond Veil (Japan)
- 2011: Movie Theme: Paradise Kiss – "I Know You’re Not Alone" from the soundtrack of Paradise Kiss (Japan)
- 2011: Larz Kristerz – "1000 frågor, ett svar" from the album Från Älvdalen till Nashville (Sweden)
- 2011: Larz Kristerz – "Du Gör Mig Lycklig" from the album Från Älvdalen till Nashville (Sweden)
- 2011: Jia Ruhan – "Wars Of Love" from the album Time To Grow (China)
- 2011: Jia Ruhan – "The World You Leave Behind" from the album Time To Grow (China)
- 2011: Jia Ruhan – "It’s Time To Grow" from the album Time To Grow (China)
- 2011: Jia Ruhan – "If You See Me Now" from the album Time To Grow (China)
- 2011: Jia Ruhan – "Missing You Still" from the album Time To Grow (China)
- 2011: Jia Ruhan – "Nothing I Won't Do" from the album Time To Grow (China)
- 2011: Jia Ruhan – "This Is The Time" from the album Time To Grow (China)
- 2011: Jia Ruhan – "Dancing On A Rainbow" single from the album Time To Grow (China)
- 2011: Playzone ’11 (musical) – "March!" from the album Playzone '11 (Japan)
- 2011: Therése Neaimé – "Heartbeat" from the album Stronger (Sweden)
- 2011: Andreas Wistrand – "Over Now" single (Sweden)
- 2010: Elliott Murphy – "Take That Devil Out Of Me" from the album Elliott Murphy (US)
- 2010: Kanjani 8 - "No-No-No" from the album Puzzle (Japan)
- 2010: Hanna Lindblad - "Manipulated" single and contestant in "Melodifestivalen" 2010 (Sweden)
- 2010: Kalle Moraeus – "Kärlekens Toner" from the album Underbart (Sweden)
- 2010: DJ Dogboy – "Holding On To You" from the album Reggae Shower 2 (Japan)
- 2009: Tania Christopher – "Fragile" Single (Netherlands)
- 2009: Paul Twohill – "Tell Me" Single (Singapore)
- 2009: DJ Dogboy – "Summertime" from the album Reggae Shower 1 (Japan)
- 2009: DJ Dogboy – "Singing In The Shower" from the album Reggae Shower 1 (Japan)
- 2009: DJ Dogboy – "Once In A Lifetime Love" from the album Reggae Shower 1 (Japan)
- 2009: Johanna Siekinnen – "Don’t Let Go" (Finland)
- 2009: Fred Hane – "Next Time" (Sweden)
- -2008: Peter Lundblad - "Julgryning Vaknar" Single (Sweden)
- -2008: Paul Twohill - "Here I Am" Single (Singapore)
- -2008: John Klass - "I’m Your Preacher" Single (Singapore)
- -2008: Chris Lindh & Camp Sweden - "Heja Sverige" unofficial theme for European Championship Football 2008 (Sweden)
- -2008: Nathalie - "Here With Me" single from the album Here With Me (Sweden)
- -2008: Nathalie - "Two Weeks Notice" from the album Here With Me (Sweden)
- -2008: Nathalie - "Come What May" from the album Here With Me (Sweden)
- -2008: Nathalie - "Silent Room" from the album Here With Me (Sweden)
- -2008: Kirsten Gundersen - "Live A Lie" from the album Beautiful Contradiction (UK)
- -2008: Kirsten Gundersen - "You Say" from the album Beautiful Contradiction (UK)
