= Ruhan =

Ruhan is a given name and surname of multiple origins. Notable people with the name include:

- Ruhan Işim (born 1970), retired Turkish pole vaulter
- Jia Ruhan, Chinese soprano
- Ruhan Nel (born 1991), South African rugby union player
- Ruhan Pretorious (born 1991), South African first-class cricketer

== Surname ==
- Andy Ruhan (born 1962), British businessman and motor racing driver
