= Rum Pum Pum Pum =

Single by f(x)

from the album Pink Tape
- Released: July 29, 2013
- Genre: K-pop; dance-pop; batucada
- Length: 3:17
- Label: SM
- Composers: Erik Lewander; Iggy Strange Dahl; Ylva Dimberg; Anne Judith Wik
- Lyricist: Jun Gan-di

F(x) singles chronology
"Electric Shock" (2012)	"Rum Pum Pum Pum" (2013)	"Red Light" (2014)

Music video
- "Rum Pum Pum Pum" on YouTube

"Rum Pum Pum Pum" (Korean: 첫 사랑니; RR: Cheot Sarangni; lit. "First Wisdom Teeth") is a song by South Korean girl group f(x). It was released as the lead single from the album Pink Tape on July 29, 2013, through SM Entertainment.

The song was well received by music critics. It was named one of the 100 Greatest Girl Group Songs of All Time by Billboard in 2019 and one of the Top 100 K-pop Songs of All Time by Melon in 2021.

== Background and release ==
"Rum Pum Pum Pum" is a song of dance-pop with exotic hand drums, whiplash-y snares, funky sixties guitar riffs, and synthesized squirt. Lyrically, it expresses first love on a wisdom teeth. f(x) compare themselves to the pesky molars in another one of their typically bizarre metaphors, with lyrics like, "Attention boys! I'm a bit different / I pushed aside all the others and took my place," and, "I will pierce through your heart's wall and grow."

The song's "Rum Pum Pum Pum" title is used to imitate the sound of a beating heart, which is brought to life with a brilliant "Little Drummer Boy" sample that later segues into samba. It is interspersed throughout the song "peoreom peoreom peom" (퍼럼퍼럼펌) and "reom peom peom peom" (럼펌펌펌). The pain of the first love is like the pain of the first wisdom tooth.

On July 17, SM Entertainment announced that f(x) would be returning to the Korean music market with their second studio album Pink Tape on July 28, 2013, after a year's absence. On the same day, the agency also released a photo teaser of Krystal on the official f(x). On July 18, SM released photos teasers of Victoria and Amber. Four days later, on July 22, SM Entertainment revealed a video teaser the album's title track, "첫 사랑니 (Rum Pum Pum Pum)", on their official YouTube channel.

== Commercial performance ==
The song rose to the number one spot on all of South Korea's music portals upon its release. With less than half the week to build sales and downloads to be included in the K-Pop Hot 100, the song was still able to debut in the top 20, appearing in 14th place in the week of August 10, 2013. A week later, the song topped the charts, marking the first number one single for the group in the Billboard Korea charts.

== Music video ==
The music shows f(x) dancing to choreography by Jillian Meyers. It features three sets: one white sparkling set, another pink room with glossy pink borders, and red ceiling-to-floor room with lights on the sides. The members are shown wearing four different outfits and showing different hairstyles. Throughout the video, the camera focuses on choreography, and zooms in on each girl in walking on the white set room with floating flowers.

== Plagiarism ==
An issue of plagiarism arose when the Department of Health of the Philippines released a music video called "Gaga Girl Bobo Boy" for their campaign against teenage pregnancy. Some internet users claimed the video sounded too much like "Rum Pum Pum". A representative of SM Entertainment revealed to No Cut News and My Daily on December 8 that "By no means have we permitted the use of the music, 'Rum Pum Pum Pum.' The original publisher of 'Rum Pum Pum Pum' confirmed that the music used by the Philippines' public service campaign in question is indeed plagiarism, so we have started taking action.

== Accolades ==
Music program awards
Program	Date	Ref.
Show Champion	August 7, 2013	
M Countdown	August 8, 2013	
Music Bank	August 9, 2013	
Inkigayo	August 11, 2013	

"Rum Pum Pum Pum" on critic lists
Publisher/critic	List	Rank	Ref.
Billboard	20 Best K-pop Songs of 2013	3	
Billboard	100 Greatest K-pop Songs of the 2010s	33	
Billboard	100 Greatest Girl Group Songs of All Time	59	
Dazed	Top ten K-pop songs of 2013	6	
Melon	Top 100 K-pop Songs of All Time	55	
Pitchfork	20 Essential K-pop Songs	Placed	
Vice	The 20 Best K-pop Songs of 2013	4	

== Credits and personnel ==
Credits adapted from the album's liner notes.

Studio

- SM Yellow Tail Studio – recording
- SM Big Shot Studio – recording
- In Grid Studio – recording
- T-Studio – recording
- SM Concert Hall Studio – mixing
- Sonic Korea – mastering

Personnel

- SM Entertainment – executive producer
- Lee Soo-man – producer
- Kim Young-min – executive supervisor
- f(x) – vocals, background vocals
- Jun Gan-di – lyrics
- Erik Lewander – composition, arrangement
- Ylva Dimberg – composition, arrangement
- Iggy Strange Dahl – composition, arrangement
- Anne Judith Wik – composition, arrangement, background vocals
- Jung Dong-yoon – arrangement
- Hitchhiker – vocal directing, sound processing
- Koo Jong-pil – recording
- Lee Min-kyu – recording
- Jung Eun-kyung – recording
- Lee Myun-sook – recording
- Nam Koong-jin – recording, mixing
- Jeon Hoon – mastering

== Charts ==
=== Weekly charts ===
Chart (2013)	Peak position
South Korea (Gaon)	1
South Korea (K-pop Hot 100)	1
US World Digital Songs (Billboard)	5

=== Monthly charts ===
Chart (August 2013)	Peak position
South Korea (Gaon)	3

=== Year-end charts ===
Chart (2013)	Position
South Korea (K-pop Hot 100)	46
