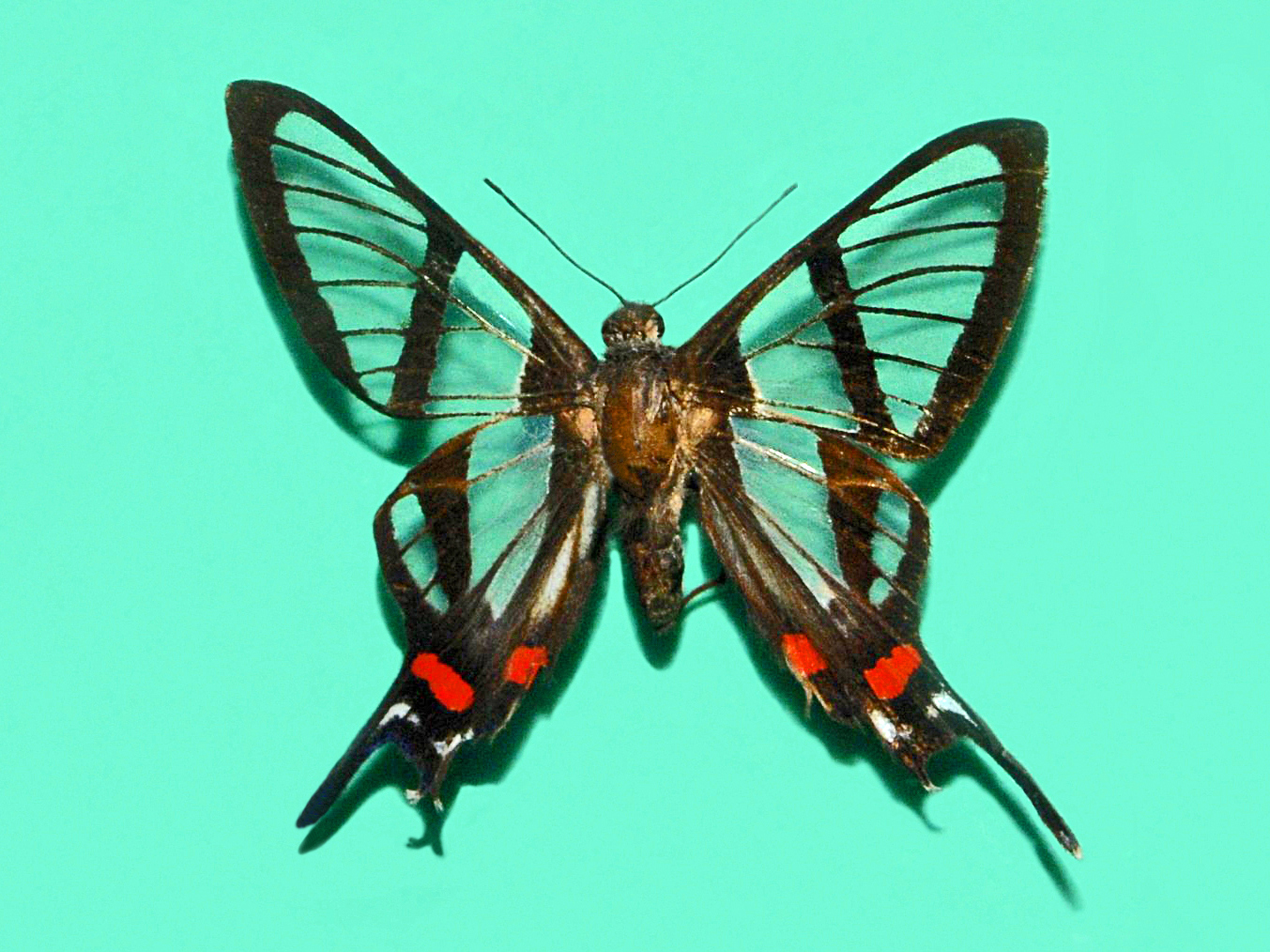
- Museum specimen of Chorinea licursis

Scientific classification
- Kingdom: Animalia
- Phylum: Arthropoda
- Class: Insecta
- Order: Lepidoptera
- Family: Riodinidae
- Subfamily: Riodininae
- Tribe: Riodinini
- Genus: Chorinea
- Species: C. licursis

Binomial name
- Chorinea licursis (Fabricius, 1775)

Synonyms
- Papilio licursis Fabricius, 1775; Erycina (Chorinea) xanthippe Gray, 1832; Erycina morissei Boisduval, 1835; Zeonia morissei Morisse, 1838

= Chorinea licursis =

Species of butterfly

Chorinea licursis is a species of butterfly belonging to the family Riodinidae.

== Description ==
Chorinea licursis has a wingspan reaching about 30–35 millimetres (1.2–1.4 in). These butterflies are quite variable with respect to the size of the transparent region and of spots on the hindwings. They have transparent wings outlined with black and long tails on the hindwings. Forewings and hindwings are crossed by black veins and by two black transverse bands. At the base of the hindwing tails there are bright red marks. Adults are usually found from March to June. Larvae feed on Celastraceae (mainly Maytenus ilicifolia and Prionostemma species).

== Distribution and habitat ==
This species can be found in the forests of Brazil (Rio Grande do Sul), at an elevation of about 0–1,000 metres (0–3,281 ft) above sea level.
