= Göran Ragnerstam =

Swedish actor (born 1957)

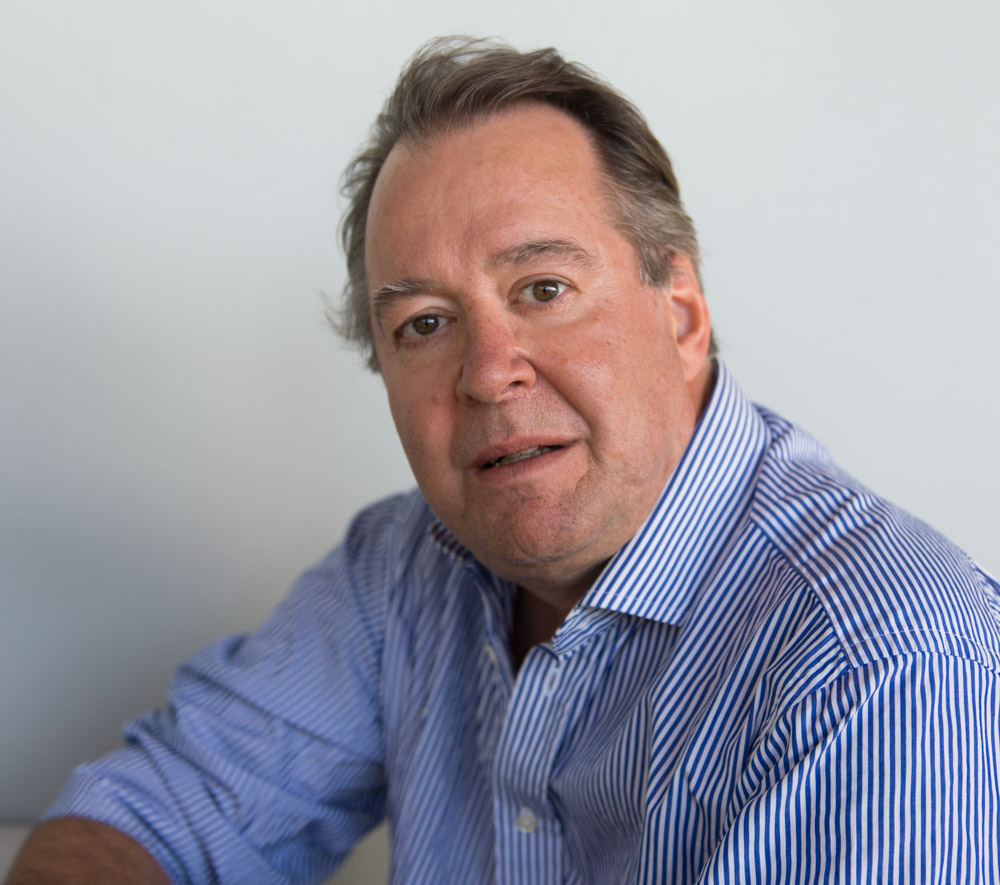
- Ragnerstam in 2015
- Born: Göran Axel Ragnerstam; 7 November 1957 (age 68); Stockholm, Sweden
- Occupation: Actor
- Years active: 1981–present
- Spouse: Carina Boberg (died 2020)
- Children: 2

Göran Axel Ragnerstam (born 7 November 1957) is a Swedish actor.

Ragnerstam was born in Stockholm; he grew up in Södermalm and later in Vällingby. His father was interested in theatre and acted out for his children. He encouraged Ragnerstam to move on to an acting course. Ragnerstam took part in plays in primary school primary education and secondary school. After that he worked on Posten AB, before he did military service conscription. An ad about training to be an actor got him to study at Kulturama, and after that he studied at NAMA in Malmö from 1981 to 1984. After that he was involved in the Gothenburg City Theatre. Ragnerstam has also worked with Lars Norén.

He was married to Carina Boberg until her death from cancer in 2020. They had two children together. He is a cousin of author Bunny Ragnerstam.

== Filmography ==
- 2017 – Jordskott II
- 2017 – Vår tid är nu
- 2016 – A Serious Game
- 2015 – Jordskott
- 2010 – Tusen gånger starkare
- 2009 – Morden
- 2007 – Arn – The Knight Templar
- 2007 – Isprinsessan
- 2006 – Pressure
- 2006 – Offside
- 2006 – Wallander – Jokern
- 2006 – En fråga om liv eller död
- 2005 – Kissed by Winter
- 2004 – Hotet
- 2004 – Graven
- 2003 – Norrmalmstorg
- 2003 – Kommer du med mig då
- 2003 – Kopps
- 2002 – Suxxess
- 2002 – Pepparrotslandet
- 2001 – Bekännelsen
- 2000 – To Be Continued
- 2000 – Soldater i månsken
- 2000 – Judith
- 1999–2001 – Sjätte dagen
- 1999 – Offerlamm
- 1999 – God jul
- 1999 – Vägen ut
- 1998 – Pip-Larssons
- 1998 – Personkrets 3:1
- 1998 – Beck – Öga för öga
- 1998 – Skärgårdsdoktorn
- 1997 – Svensson Svensson
- 1997 – Rika barn leka bäst
- 1997 – Solstenen
- 1997 – Glappet
- 1997 – Emma åklagare
- 1996 – Rusar i hans famn
- 1996 – En fyra för tre
- 1996 – Älskade Lotten
- 1996 – Ett sorts Hades
- 1995 – Torntuppen
- 1995 – En på miljonen
- 1994 – Pillertrillaren
- 1993 – Hedda Gabler
- 1987 – Lysande landing
- 1985 – Åshöjdens BK
- 1981 – Skål och välkommen

== Theatre ==
- 1999 – Skuggpojkarna
