= Martin Björk =

Swedish television presenter

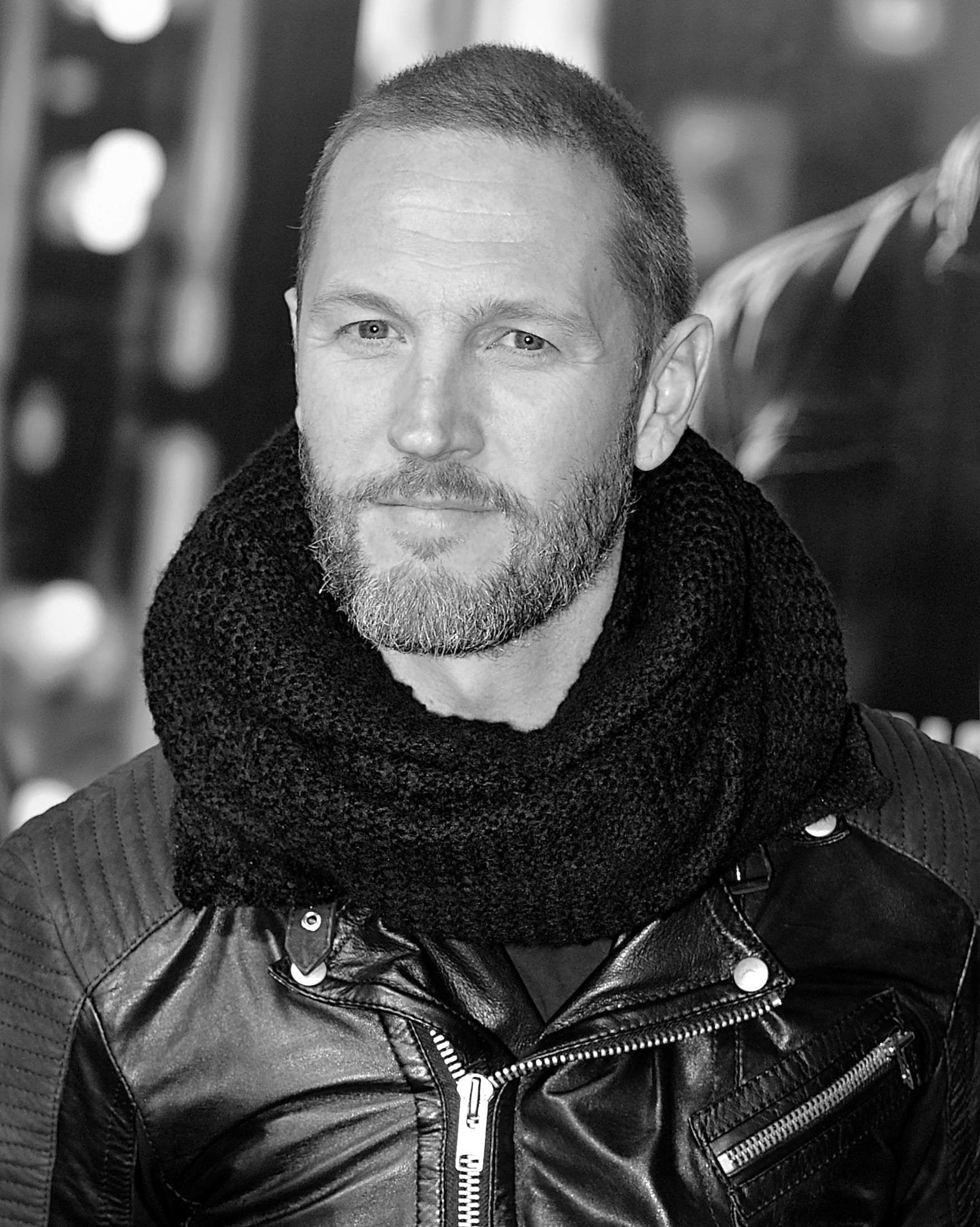
- Björk in 2012
- Born: Martin Mikael Björk; 7 November 1971 (age 54); Bålsta, Sweden
- Occupation: Television presenter
- Known for: Temptation Island, Fråga Olle

Martin Mikael Björk (born 7 November 1971) is a Swedish television presenter. He has hosted shows like Fråga Olle, the Swedish version of Temptation Island and Peking Express all on Kanal5. Between 2011 and 2013, he also hosted the radio talk show Vakna med NRJ along with Jakob Öqvist and Izabella Fröberg. The show was also simultaneously broadcast on Kanal5. Björk also owns and runs his clothing line called M.B., which are the initials of his name. He studied economics at Uppsala University between 1991 and 1994.

Björk married footballer Tina Nordlund in 2004, but the couple broke up four months later. Later in the same year, Björk started a relationship with singer Lena Philipsson, and the couple stayed together until 2008.
