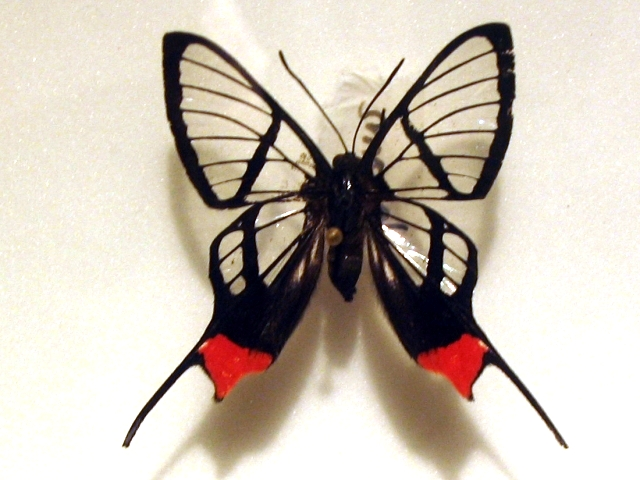

Scientific classification
- Kingdom: Animalia
- Phylum: Arthropoda
- Class: Insecta
- Order: Lepidoptera
- Family: Riodinidae
- Subfamily: Riodininae
- Tribe: Riodinini
- Genus: Chorinea
- Species: C. octauius

Binomial name
- Chorinea octauius (Fabricius, 1787)

Synonyms
- Papilio octauius Fabricius, 1787; Papilio faunus Fabricius, 1775 (preocc. Drury, 1773); Papilio chorineus Cramer, 1775 (preocc. Drury, 1773); Syrmatia chorinea Hübner, [1819]

= Chorinea octauius =

Octauius swordtail

Species of butterfly

Chorinea octauius (octauius swordtail) is a species of butterfly of the family Riodinidae. It is found in South America.

== Subspecies ==
- Chorinea octauius octauius (Guianas, Surinam, Trinidad, Venezuela)
- Chorinea octauius orchestris Stichel, 1910 (Peru)
