= Offside (2006 Swedish film) =

- Directed by: Mårten Klingberg
- Written by: Mårten Klingberg; Oskar Söderlund
- Produced by: Christer Nilson
- Starring: Jonas Karlsson; Torkel Petersson; Göran Ragnerstam; Ingvar Hirdwall; Brendan Coyle; Tina Nordlund
- Distributed by: Sandrews
- Release date: 18 August 2006
- Running time: 99 minutes
- Country: Sweden
- Language: Swedish

Offside is a Swedish film from 2006, directed by Mårten Klingberg and starring Jonas Karlsson, Torkel Petersson, Ingvar Hirdwall, Göran Ragnerstam and Brendan Coyle.

== Plot ==
Åsa works part-time with the finances at ICA in the small town Stenfors and hasn't worked full-time for two years. Anders lives with Åsa and plays for the local football club Stenfors BK, which is residing far down in the Swedish league system. They'll be shut down if they get relegated this season. Åsa, who has no friends, gets very little time with the family and feels her life is meaningless; she wants to move to Gothenburg where there are full-time jobs, but Anders wants to stay in Stenfors as he has friends in his team. Åsa wants her and their daughter Sara to have more time with him. She says she's got nothing, but Anders says he does everything he can do for the family. Through the acquisition of former Liverpool F.C. star Duncan Miller as coach and other players, the team manages to avoid relegation. Still, Anders and Åsa decide to move to Gothenburg, after Anders had been forced to sell their television to buy Sara her dream dance shoes.

== Actors ==
- Jonas Karlsson as Anders
- Torkel Petersson as Tommy
- Ingvar Hirdwall as Boston
- Göran Ragnerstam as Kent
- Brendan Coyle as Duncan Miller
- Anja Lundqvist as Åsa
- Tina Nordlund as Annika

== See also ==
- List of association football films

== Notes ==
- Duncan Miller is a fictional character and has never played for Liverpool F.C. or any other football club.
- Stenfors BK is a fictional football club.
- The place depicted by Stenfors is Billingsfors.
- Tina Nordlund appears in the film as a football player. She was a football player in real life too. She has played many times for the Sweden national team and for Umeå IK. She retired in 2002, because of anorexia nervosa.
