= Ain't No Saint (song) =

Single by Peg Parnevik
- Released: 14 March 2016
- Genre: Pop
- Length: 3:07
- Label: Sony Music Entertainment Sweden
- Songwriter(s): Peg Parnevik; Erik Lewander; Josefin Glenmark
- Producer(s): Erik Lewander

Peg Parnevik singles chronology
"Ain't No Saint" (2016)	"We Are (Ziggy & Carola)" (2016)

Music video
- "Ain't No Saint" on YouTube

"Ain't No Saint" is a song by Swedish singer and television personality Peg Parnevik. The song was released as a digital download on 14 March 2016, and was written by Parnevik along with Erik Lewander and Josefin Glenmark, while Lewander produced the song as well. The song has since peaked at number 2 on Sverigetopplistan.

== Track listing ==
Digital download
No.	Title	Length
1.	"Ain't No Saint"	3:07

== Chart performance ==
=== Weekly charts ===
Chart (2016)	Peak position
Sweden (Sverigetopplistan)	2

== Release history ==
Region	Date	Format	Label
Worldwide	14 March 2016	Digital download	Sony Music Entertainment Sweden
