= Tommy (2014 film) =

- Theatrical release poster
- Directed by: Tarik Saleh
- Written by: Anton Hagwall
- Produced by: Kristina Åberg
- Starring: Moa Gammel; Lykke Li Zachrisson; Ola Rapace
- Cinematography: Carl Nilsson
- Edited by: Linda Jildmalm; Dino Jonsäter; Theis Schmidt
- Music by: Martin Landquist
- Production company: Tordenfilm
- Release dates: February 1, 2014 (Gothenburg Film Festival); March 14, 2014 (Sweden)
- Running time: 92 minutes
- Country: Sweden
- Language: Swedish
- Box office: $470,338

Tommy is a 2014 Swedish crime thriller film directed by Tarik Saleh. The film premiered as the closing film of the Gothenburg Film Festival on February 1, 2014, and was later released in Sweden on March 14, 2014. It stars Moa Gammel, Ola Rapace, and Swedish singer Lykke Li in her acting debut. Li also contributed to the film's soundtrack with the song "Du är den ende".

== Premise ==
After a year abroad Estelle (Moa Gammel) returns home to collect her husband’s share of the loot from a major robbery.

== Cast ==
- Moa Gammel as Estelle
- Lykke Li Zachrisson as Blanca
- Ola Rapace as Bobby
- Johan Rabaeus as Steve
- Ewa Fröling as Katarina
- Alexej Manvelov as Matte
- Ingela Olsson as Marianne Löfgren
- Amanda Ooms as Lena
- Inez Buckner as Isabel
