= Tina Nordlund =

Swedish footballer

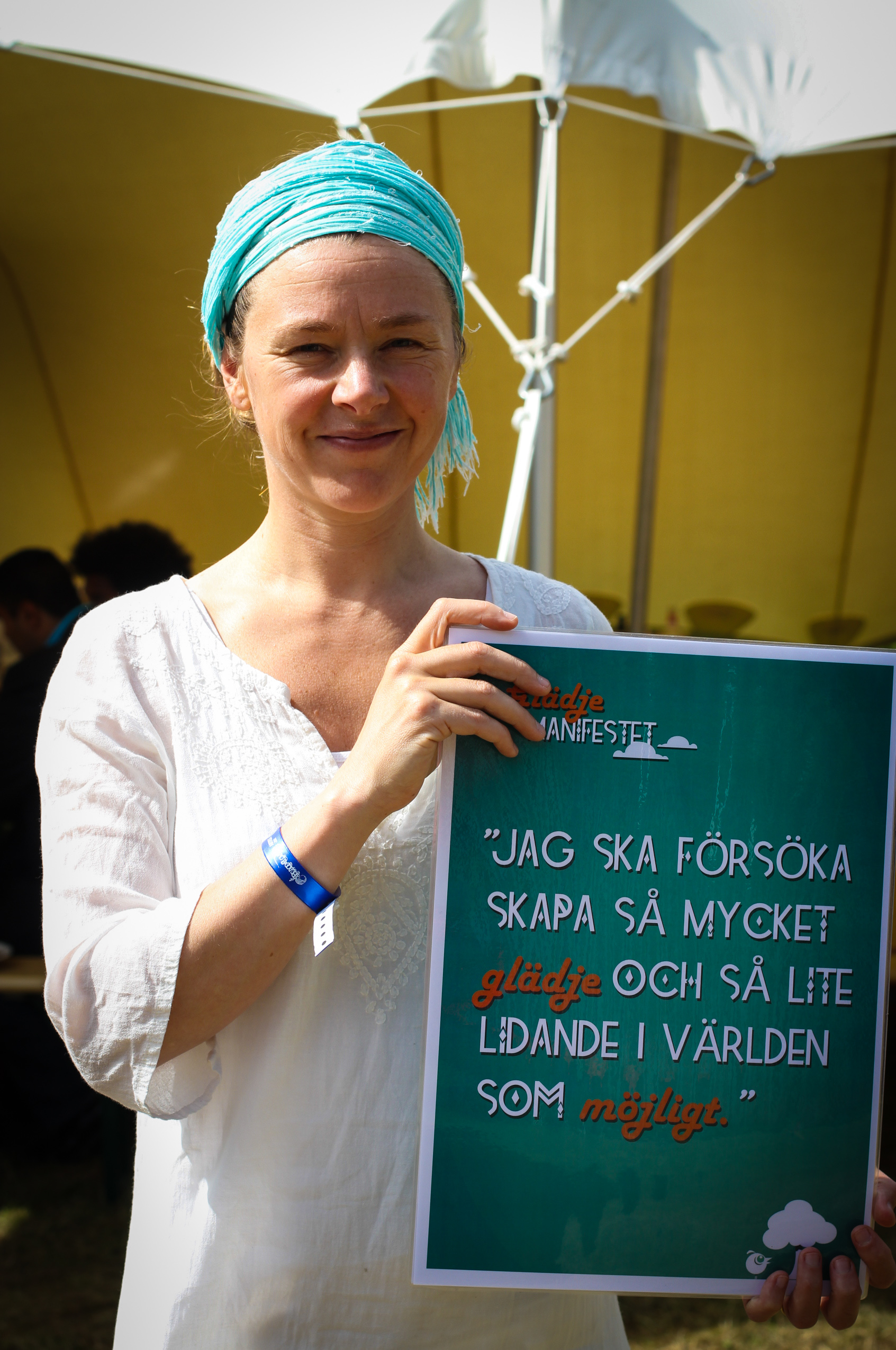
- Tina Nordlund in June 2012

Personal information
- Full name: Tina Cecilia Elisabeth Nordlund
- Date of birth: 19 March 1977 (age 49)
- Place of birth: Sundsvall, Sweden
- Height: 1.67 m (5 ft 6 in)
- Position: Midfielder

Youth career
- –1987: Stöde IF
- 1987–1989: Moffe BK
- 1990–1994: Alnö IF

Senior career*
Years	Team	Apps	(Gls)
1994–1996	Sundsvalls DFF		
1996–2002	Umeå IK		
1998–1999	Tranmere Rovers		

International career
1997–2002	Sweden	43	(7)
- * Club domestic league appearances and goals

Tina Cecilia Elisabeth Nordlund (born 19 March 1977) is a Swedish football coach and former player, most recently an assistant coach at Umeå IK. She is one of the most well known Swedish female footballers. In November 2000, she was awarded the Diamantbollen, an annual award made to the best female player in Sweden, during the Swedish Soccer Awards, and during her speech she expressed her thoughts that women's soccer received too little media publicity. She played for Alnö IF, Sundsvalls DFF and Umeå IK. She retired from playing football aged 25 after suffering from anorexia nervosa.

In her youth years she, except for playing soccer, also practiced alpine skiing, bandy, basketball and golf.

== Club career ==
After the 1998 season, Nordlund approached English FA Women's Premier League club Tranmere Rovers about playing for them in 1998–99. At the time she was visiting boyfriend Jesper Blomqvist, who was contracted to Manchester United.

Making her debut in a 4–0 win over champions and local rivals Everton in December 1998, Nordlund remained until 1 February 1999. She then returned to Umeå IK in order to preserve her national team place ahead of the 1999 FIFA Women's World Cup.

== International career ==
After winning eight caps at Under 17 level and 19 Under 21 caps, Nordlund made her senior Sweden debut in a 3–1 defeat by the United States at Baylor School, Chattanooga, Tennessee, on 30 October 1997. Her 9th-minute goal against Denmark in the Semi-Final of the 2001 UEFA Women's Euro proved to be the deciding goal of the match, propelling Sweden to the Final.

== Personal life ==
Nordlund appeared in the 2006 Swedish comedy film Offside, as a football player. She is a Lazio supporter.

She has been married to Swedish television presenter Martin Björk.
