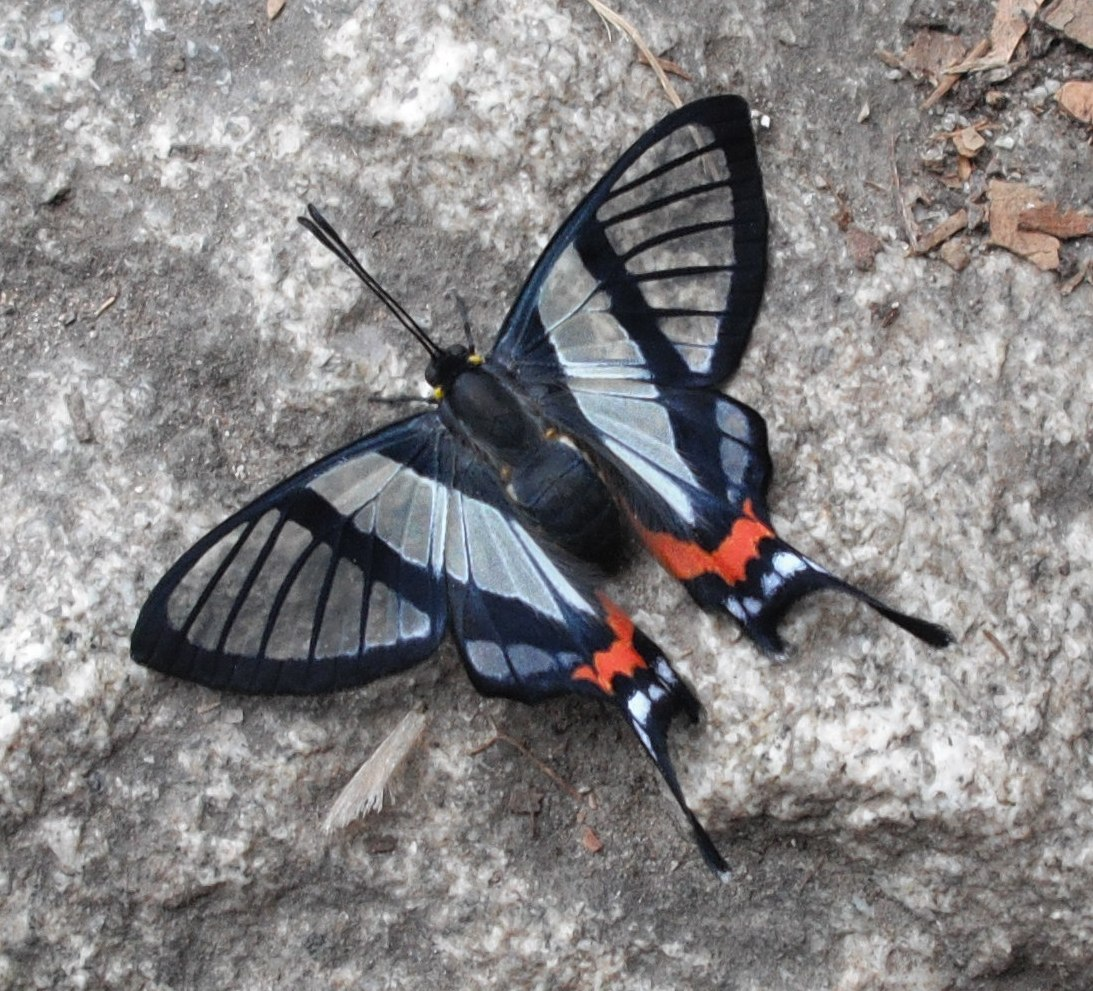

Scientific classification
- Domain: Eukaryota
- Kingdom: Animalia
- Phylum: Arthropoda
- Class: Insecta
- Order: Lepidoptera
- Family: Riodinidae
- Subfamily: Riodininae
- Tribe: Riodinini
- Genus: Chorinea
- Species: C. sylphina

Binomial name
- Chorinea sylphina (Bates, 1868)

Synonyms
- Zeonia sylphina Bates, 1868; Chorinea sylphina terpsichore Stichel, 1910

= Chorinea sylphina =

Sylphina angel

Species of butterfly

Chorinea sylphina (sylphina angel) is a species of butterfly of the family Riodinidae. It is found in Ecuador, Peru, and Bolivia.

Adults fly in full sunshine, but occasionally settle beneath the leaves of bushes.
