= Jordskott =

Swedish television series

- Title card
- Genre: Thriller; Mystery; Fantasy
- Screenplay by: Henrik Björn; Alexander Kantsjö; Fredrik T Olsson
- Directed by: Anders Engström; Henrik Björn
- Creative director: Henrik Björn
- Starring: Moa Gammel; Göran Ragnerstam; Richard Forsgren; Lia Boysen; Ville Virtanen; Vanja Blomkvist; Ann Petrén; Stina Sundlöf; Yohio
- Composers: Erik Lewander; Olle Ljungman; Iggy Strange Dahl
- Country of origin: Sweden
- Original language: Swedish
- No. of seasons: 2
- No. of episodes: 18

Production
- Executive producer: Henrik Björn
- Producer: Filip Hammarström
- Cinematography: Kjell Lagerroos; Pelle Hallert
- Editor: Lars Gustafson
- Running time: 60 minutes
- Production companies: Palladium Fiction; Pinewood Studios (season 2)

Original release
- Network: SVT
- Release: June 10, 2015 – December 7, 2017

Jordskott (Swedish: [ˈjûːɖʂkɔt], "soil shoot") is a Swedish TV thriller, crime drama series with fantasy elements. Police detective Eva Thörnblad (Moa Gammel) investigates the disappearance of her daughter and other mysteries in her hometown of Silverhöjd. The title refers to jordskott, a fictional plant parasite, which enhances one's perceptions but feeds off the host's blood. The series was first broadcast by SVT in 2015 with ten episodes. Filming took place in Sala and Ragunda in mid-2014. The series then began broadcasting on ITV Encore in the UK on June 10, 2015, and on Canal+ Seriale in Poland on October 10, 2016.

Following positive reception and strong international sales for the first series, a second series of eight episodes, Jordskott II, followed. It aired from 15 October 2017 in Sweden. It was then screened on ITV Encore in the UK from 19 October onwards and on Shudder in the US from 18 January 2019 onwards.

== Plot ==
The first season of Jordskott is set in mid-2014. Police detective Eva Thörnblad returns to her hometown of Silverhöjd, seven years after her daughter Josefine disappeared beside a forest lake. Josefine's body was never found and local police determined that she had drowned. Upon Eva's return, a local boy has been missing for a week and she looks for similarities between the two disappearances. At the same time, she deals with the death and probate of her late father and his large timber felling, silver mining and processing business, Thörnblad Mineral & Cellulosa.

Eva teams up with Göran Wass, a Rikskriminalen detective (and a member of a secret society), and Tom Aronsson (Richard Forsgren), a local detective. They discover that the children's disappearances are inextricably tangled with the conflict between locals, who depend on Thörnblad Mineral & Cellulosa, and mystical beings protecting the forest and surroundings.

In season two, set in early 2017, Eva is back in Stockholm, trying to find missing teenagers and to solve the mystery of a man who dies as he turns to stone. Eva mostly works with Göran and then Tom. The investigations lead into her mother's past as an investigative journalist. The case has connections to Göran's organisation, Envoyés de la Nature (EN) or Nature's Messengers. Eva and Göran find links to changelings at a hospital. Eva also deals with Josefine's absence.

== Cast ==
- Moa Gammel as Eva Thörnblad, a police detective from Stockholm who returns to her hometown of Silverhöjd. Eva later returns to Stockholm.
- Göran Ragnerstam as Göran Wass, a Rikskriminalen detective assigned to investigate the disappearances. He is also a member of a secret society, Envoyés de la Nature (EN) or Nature's Messengers. Note: the actor's daughter, Matilda Ragnerstam portrays a nurse in series 1.
- Richard Forsgren as Tom Aronsson, Silverhöjd senior detective.
- Vanja Blomkvist as Ylva, a mystic and isolated woman who lives near Silverhöjd. Her familiar is a raven, Vordur. She later mentors Nicklas
- Ann Petrén as Martina Sigvardsson, the county police commissioner for the Silverhöjd area.
- Mira Gustafsson as Ida Aronsson, Tom's non-verbal young daughter. Generally lives with her mother, Petra in Stockholm.
- Henrik Knutsson as Nicklas Gunarsson, Gerda's mentally disabled son, Eva's half-brother. Later mentored by Ylva.
- Happy Jankell as Esmeralda, young woman with mysterious psychic powers, later travels to Stockholm.
- Gustav Lindh as Jörgen Olsson, a local youth who becomes embroiled in Silverhöjd's mysteries, Eddie's older brother, wants to find Esmeralda.
- Gerhard Hoberstorfer as "Man from EN"/Gabriel Moreaux, Stockholm-based, Göran's EN superior, his motto is "the ends justify the means", Göran disagrees with his harsh methods.
- Louise Ryme as Petra, Tom's ex-wife, Ida's mother, Stockholm resident.
- Yohio as Linus, an androgynous goth teenager, Esmeralda's friend. He later moves to Stockholm.
- Johannes Brost as Pekka Koljonen, Silverhöjd senior doctor, treated Johan, Eva and Josefine.
- Max Vobora as Eddie Olsson, Jörgen's 17-year-old younger brother, interested in Esmeralda, killed by his own knife.
- Duncan Green (Swedish actor) as Frank Olsson, Jörgen and Eddie's father. Violent and abusive drunkard.
- Marta Oldenburg as Klara, a woman with proficient psychic powers, she later teaches Esmeralda.
- Stina Sundlöf as Forest girl/Josefine Thörnblad, Eva's daughter who was long thought to be dead or missing.
  - Amie Vestholm as Josefine (six year-old).

=== Recurring cast ===
==== Series 1 (2015) ====
- Ville Virtanen as Harry Storm, a mysterious and deadly bounty hunter hired by powerful people. His dog Kuba helps track down targets.
- Lia Boysen as Gerda Gunnarsson, Johan Thörnblad's former secretary and lover, Nicklas' mother.
- Peter Andersson as Gustaf Borén, current CEO of Thörnblad Mineral & Cellulosa.
- Nour El-Refai as Victoria, Silverhöjd police officer.
- Felix Engström as Thomas Leander, Thörnblad Mineral & Cellulosa board member, his son Anton is missing. His other son is Oscar.
- Ann-Sofie Rase as Jeanette Eriksson, Thörnblad Mineral & Cellulosa board member, Emma's mother.
- Lars-Erik Berenett as Johan Thörnblad, Eva's recently deceased father and former CEO of Thörnblad Mineral & Cellulosa. He was infected by a jordskott – a plant parasite. He supposedly died by suicide in a barn fire.
- Hans Mosesson as Olof Gran, retired Silverhöjd police officer, living in nearby Bräckö.
- Sigrid Johnson as Emma Eriksson, Jeanette's young daughter, later goes missing.
- Bengt Braskered as Pierre Hedman, Thörnblad Mineral & Cellulosa's lawyer.
- Alba August as Lina. Anton and Oscar's nanny. She is distraught when Anton goes missing.
- Jan-Ivar Utas as Jeppe Bergman, taxi driver, collects gold jewelry, he is murdered.
- Mattias Fransson as Borje Dahlqvist, geologist, who is bought off by Gustaf to authorise further blasting in the forest.
- Jan Tiselius as Ebbe, aged care resident, Jeppe and Tore's brother, collects hats. He is also murdered.
- Karen Bergqvist as Anna-Lena Borén, Gustaf's wife.
- Tomas Laustiola as Silverhöjd forensic pathologist.
- Oskar Thunberg as Holmström, detonation engineer, corrupted by bribes.

==== Series 2 (2017) ====
- Anders Berg as Jakob Reisner, head of Eva's Stockholm police unit, a stickler for correct procedure.
- Ana Gil de Melo Nascimento as Bahar Holmqvist, Eva's new colleague in the Stockholm police. Begins to suspect Eva of manipulating evidence.
- Anna Bjelkerud as Agneta Thörnblad, Eva's mother, former journalist, now in aged care.
  - Maria Alm Norell as Young Agneta, journalist, separated from Johan, Leif's colleague.
- Nikoletta Norrby as Maja Njyman, 14-year-old loner from Silverhöjd, collects insects, befriended by Esmeralda, both travel to Stockholm.
- Alexej Manvelov as "Dr. Parker"/Dante Milles, a criminal suspected of kidnapping teenage girls, former EN member.
- Electra Hallman as Zara/Jorun Norrbacka, midwife/neonatal nurse with a mysterious background. Works clandestinely with Dante. Stockholm-based but previously worked in Silverhöjd.
- Nuur Adam as Kalem, an orphaned teenager, African illegal immigrant, befriends Ida. Robin's love interest.
- Rebecka Hemse as Laila Roos, Stockholm forensic pathologist, Jakob's wife, member of EN.
- Eric Ericson as Inge Skyllqvist/Svente Bergwall, new Silverhöjd forensic investigator, Göran's colleague at EN, supports Gabriel's harsh methods. As Svente he posed as an archaeologist.
- Björn Andrésen as "Man under ice"/Leif Cederholm, tortured, desiccated, seeks Zara and Agneta, turned to stone and dies.
  - Kristoffer Mark Adolfsson as Young Leif, photographer, Agneta's Silverhöjd colleague, and then in Stockholm.
- Pelle Heikkilä as Rami Hemalainen, thuggish criminal, involved in human trafficking. Owns a guard dog, Stalin, keeps prisoners at a factory, Silo. Later Rami is found dismembered in Silverhöjd.
- Daniel Atterhagen as Tony Lind, criminal, involved in human trafficking. Commits suicide after arrest.
- Ester Lennstrund as Robin Lundberg, teenager, collects rats, kidnapped and held by Rami. Kalem's love interest.
- Linda Källgren as Desirée Lundberg, former figure skater, Robin's mother, dies possibly by suicide.
- Ingela Olsson as Lena Åberg, Eva's aunt, Agneta's sister, married to Roffe, raised teenaged Eva, fosters Kalem.
- Tomas Norström as Roffe, Eva's uncle, married to Lena, building a sauna, fosters Kalem.
- Kristofer Kamiyasu as Stefan, Stockholm forensics specialist in ballistics and DNA profiling.
- Sally Fogelberg Lindberg as Eva (10 year-old), living with Agneta, who becomes increasingly demented.
- Elina du Rietz as Susie, Stockholm midwife, works alongside Zara.
- Frans Rosengarten as Jesajah, powerful mind reader, EN member, averse to liars.
- Pierre Dahlander as Lasse Björkman, removalist company manager, minor criminal, he worked with but feared Rami.

== Episodes ==
=== Series 1 (2015) ===
No.	Title	Directed by	Written by	UK air date	UK viewers (million)
1	"Del I"	Henrik Björn	Henrik Björn, Alexander Kantsjö, Fredrik T. Olsson	10 June 2015	0.15
Eva returns to Silverhöjd, seven years after Josefine's disappearance at a forest lake. Although ruled a drowning, Josefine's body was never found. Now a second child disappears in similar circumstances. Eva is convinced that someone kidnapped the children but shuns the local police for being inept. At her family's estate she searches through Johan's effects. Pierre tells Eva that Johan's will is missing: this delays the probate. She meets Gustaf and Gerda. Göran sees her at Anton's abduction site and sounds her out about joining his investigation. They find Oscar, Anton's brother, in the woods and return him to Thomas and Lina. On Eva's way home she almost runs into a girl on a forest track. The girl has the same earring as Josefine. She is badly bruised and non-verbal, Eva takes her to Silverhöjd hospital where the girl is treated by Pekka. Eva believes she has found Josefine. Eva tracks down Olof, he no longer believes Josefine was abducted. When pressed Olof runs off leaving behind his notebook, which includes strange runes. He gets into Jeppe's taxi. Later Eva sees Storm and Kuba searching the forest. Storm looks for signs of mystical beings, which he blames for taking children.
2	"Del II"	Anders Engström	Henrik Björn, Alexander Kantsjö & Fredrik T. Olsson	17 June 2015	0.11
Eva is frustrated at being excluded from seeing Josefine. Pekka treats Eva for ragwort; he confirms that Josefine has the same parasite that Johan had. Eva meets Ylva who gives her a smelly ointment but she discards it. Eva goes to see Gerda and Nicklas to learn about Johan's decline in his latter years. At Thörnblad estate she finds Johan's video diaries chronicling his infestation and a note with runes similar to Olof's notebook. Gustaf consults Borje, who warns that further mining will result in sinkholes. Thomas asks Gustaf to reconsider meeting the abductor's demands but is refused: they rely on Storm finding Anton. Eva finds Jeppe, who tells her Olof took a ferry to Bräckö. She is trailed by a white van with distinctive spotlights. She asks Olof to translate her note. Jeppe is found dead in his taxi with his throat slit. Göran and Tom interview Albin, Jeppe's friend, while Ylva observes. Tom finds Jeppe's hoard of gold trinkets behind his caravan wall. Eva is attacked on the ferry and tied to its anchor, she struggles free and then taken to hospital. Thomas puts smelly ointment on Oscar's neck. Eva sings a lullaby to Josefine who finishes it.
3	"Del III"	Anders Engström	Henrik Björn, Alexander Kantsjö & Fredrik T. Olsson	24 June 2015	0.19
Eddie and Jörgen use Nicklas' gun in the forest and disturb a sjörå (freshwater creature), which reacts with deafening sound. Josefine disappears, Eva joins the search by local police. Tom initially suspects Eva's involvement. Eva describes Storm, Kuba and his white van. Nicklas reports the shooting to Göran but reacts violently when restrained. Gerda demands to see Nicklas, who identifies the Olsson brothers. Jörgen's eardrums burst, Eddie is partially deafened. Göran interviews them, Eddie claims Nicklas shot the gun and describes the creature. Ylva tries to visit Tore (Jeppe's brother) but his scrap yard is closed. Eva has a sketch artist draw Storm. Police trace Storm's van and Jeppe's taxi to Tore's yard. Tore is dead, Storm took over his shed and booby-trapped it. At the river Göran finds shells from Nicklas' gun and Storm's shotgun casings. The latter match those in Storm's shed: he killed the freshwater creature. Its mutilated body is recovered from river turbines. Eva sees a dark shape on hospital CCTV. Eva gets Olof's translation, "the girl is yours every full moon. If you keep your promise, she'll live." Hence, Johan knew about Josefine's abduction. Ylva warns Ebbe of Jeppe's murder and Tore being missing.
4	"Del IV"	Anders Engström	Henrik Björn, Alexander Kantsjö & Fredrik T. Olsson	1 July 2015	0.11
Eva secretes Josefine in her bedroom. From Johan's tapes, she feeds Josefine purée. Eva finds a bottle with dark liquid: her house was broken into. Police are called but after seeing Johan drinking similar liquid she realises Josefine needs it. A nurse finds Ebbe with his throat cut. Göran removes Ebbe's tail from his room and notices a missing photo. The nurse recalls it showed Ebbe with his brothers. Tom collects Ida from Petra at the railway station. After Nicklas is bullied he runs to Gustaf – his dad. Gustaf orders Gerda to stop Nicklas' visits. After recent murders, Gustaf orders Storm to leave but he shows cutoff tail to demonstrate they are monsters. Ylva warns Sture (Jeppe's third brother): he escapes from Storm. Tom introduces Eva to Ida who rarely talks, but she likes drawing. Forensic pathologist shows Göran the creature's corpse has liquefied: it flows to the floor. Ylva notices frogs are dying. Storm stalks Esmeralda: sees her with Eddie. Eva takes her black potion from the police evidence room and treats Josefine, who gets better. Eva finds another bottle in a tunnel leading to her house. Back upstairs she finds Josefine singing her lullaby.
5	"Del V"	Henrik Björn	Henrik Björn, Alexander Kantsjö & Fredrik T. Olsson	8 July 2015	0.10
Eddie clutches his neck; falls through a window: dead with his throat cut. Jörgen sees Esmeralda, who runs off. Olof translates Eva's second note: offers to trade Josefine for "the other girl." Eva has a photo of Emma. Tom and Göran find a bloodied knife at Eddie's party. Partygoers remember Esmeralda with him, she lived at Solberga: a student hostel. Emma is bullied for smelling due to ointment, which keeps monsters away. Hanna, Solberga manager, recalls Esmeralda collected knives and her friend is Linus. Göran enlists Ylva to purify the river. Olof learns the town water is undrinkable: he rants at Göran about the causes. Gerda wants Gustaf's help with Nicklas; threatening to tell Anna-Lena. Tom and Ida visit Eva. Ida wanders upstairs to Josefine: she hands over her sketchbook. Eva finds them, Ida says, "the girl is sad... She is vanishing." Eva tears out Josefine's drawing: recognises her dad's factory. At the factory Eva finds Storm had re-painted his van. Martina and Göran's press conference is interrupted by Olof's fracas. Petra claims Silverhöjd is dangerous and gets Ida back. Tom finds Esmeralda in his car. Göran is told by his EN superior that Olof was silenced: he is drowned.
6	"Del VI"	Henrik Björn	Henrik Björn, Alexander Kantsjö & Fredrik T. Olsson	15 July 2015	0.09
Eva injects anaesthetic into pear juice and abducts Emma. Ylva feeds a young sjörå: Göran supplies funds. Jeanette cannot say why Emma was kidnapped. Eva collects a police GPS-tracker. Jeanette asks for Eva's help and recalls Johan warned more children would be taken. Tom videotapes Esmeralda's interview: Eddie promised his knife for sex. Esmeralda does not recognise Storm. Storm's booby-trapped van is hidden; he drives another car. Eva bathes Emma: removing all scent. Göran scopes the abduction scene, finds a doctored juice carton and Eva's scent. He sends Eva a message that he's on his way. When he arrives, Eva responds: meet at the police station. Instead Eva drives into the forest. She carries Emma, with the tracker fitted, to a moss mound. Martina tells Göran: Eva's gone. Göran finds Tom stabbed in the neck: orders an ambulance. Göran removes the interview tape. Esmeralda has fled. Borje is corrupted: gives Gustaf another report. Frank offers Esmeralda a lift but threatens her at gunpoint. She begs to be killed: he releases her. Emma is taken: the tracker and another note is left. Josefine guides Eva to Johan's hidden upstairs den. Eva finds Johan's book and a contract. Eva is shot.
7	"Del VII"	Henrik Björn	Henrik Björn, Alexander Kantsjö & Fredrik T. Olsson	22 July 2015	0.10
Göran takes Eva to Ylva, they feed her a jordskott, which saves her. Nicklas brings Josefine to his barn. Gustaf orders Holmström to ready explosives. Martina visits Tom in hospital: he's not to return until recovered. Göran searches Eva's estate and finds a shell casing. Nicklas reads Johan's book. Jeanette and Thomas support the Greenie's rally. Ylva talks about Frederick's agreement with the Rå (nature's wardens). Johan broke it in 1978 when spraying toxic defoliant, killing hundreds of beings. Ylva walked the desolation, found baby Muns, and nurtured him to health. EN superior castigates Göran for saving Eva, however Göran claims she is an asset. Esmeralda drops her bloodied cotton balls. Jörgen hands them to Storm. Greenies blockade land clearing workers. Gustaf confronts Jeanette and Thomas. The forest shakes with a detonation, which causes a sinkhole. Göran takes the shell casing to ballistics. Tom looks for Esmeralda's interview tape, Göran convinces him there's no tape. Ylva cautions Eva to make slow adjustments to overwhelming stimuli and ration her potion. Esmeralda and Linus meet, he gives her a new knife. Storm attacks Esmeralda, takes her knife but she forces it toward his neck. He lunges away: slashing Kuba. Esmeralda runs away.
8	"Del VIII"	Anders Engström	Henrik Björn, Alexander Kantsjö & Fredrik T. Olsson	29 July 2015	0.08
A janitor calls the police. Pierre wants Eva to sell her shares. Instead she buys Jeanette and Thomas' shares to become the majority stakeholder. Eva confronts the board: all current forest activity is stopped. Göran coaches Eva on how to scope a scene at the school. Storm, Kuba and Esmeralda fought. Eva finds a cross. Storm tries to shoot Kuba, but Esmeralda forces the gun to his temple. He resists and shoots Kuba. Gustaf announces blasting has stopped. Gerda phones Gustaf and threatens to reveal their affair. Göran confiscates Linus' phone as Tom interviews him. Göran sets a meet-up with Esmeralda. Gerda follows Nicklas to the barn, finds Josefine and Johan's book. Jörgen reads Storm's website on huldra. Eva promises Muns to stop deforestation and mining. Gerda gives Storm Johan's book to find the silver. Göran takes Esmeralda to Klara. Petra tells Tom that Ida draws a girl lying on a bed. He recognises Eva's estate. He breaks in and finds Emma's red jacket. In Johan's den Eva finds another video: he acknowledges Nicklas as his son. Storm uses the book to set explosives and blast access to the silver lode. Muns goes to the hospital's children's ward.
9	"Del IX"	Anders Engström	Henrik Björn, Alexander Kantsjö & Fredrik T. Olsson	5 August 2015	0.10
Muns hides five more children underground. Johan's video confirms he was shot. Storm wants revenge for his family's deaths. Eva and Göran follow the children's trail to a grating. Göran confirms Olof was drugged into paranoia. Tom hides Emma's jacket in his office. Jeanette asks Eva about it. Göran stalls Tom as Eva removes the jacket. Göran gaslights Tom: he doubts finding it. Ylva accosts Eva for latest detonation: Eva surmises Borén ordered it. EN superior reprimands Göran for the new kidnappings. Gerda pays Holmström to resume blasting. Storm claims no children are near the silver. Eva confronts Gustaf, who shifts the blame to Gerda. Gerda forces Eva to sign over her shares by threatening Josefine. She orders Eva to leave town. Ylva takes the sjörå to a river. Storm follows Vordur to Ylva's home: takes her jordskotts and notebook. Tom finds Göran's cache, including Esmeralda's interview tape. When Göran arrives he has Emma's jacket. He disarms Tom and explains how EN protects huldra. Vordur warns Göran about Storm. Gerda reverses Eva's decisions with the board. Esmeralda helps Göran find Storm. Storm kills Vordur. Göran and Storm shoot each other. Petra phones Tom: Ida has disappeared, somehow its his fault.
10	"Del X"	Henrik Björn & Anders Engström	Henrik Björn, Alexander Kantsjö & Fredrik T. Olsson	12 August 2015	0.11
Jakob takes over Silverhöjd investigations: he dismisses Eva. Göran's hand is in soil. Eva tells Tom of Gerda continuing blasts. Ylva finds her home ransacked, Göran gives her Vordur's corpse. Tom views Ida travelling to Silverhöjd and then in the forest. Eva goes to Gerda's barn, finds Gerda's cancer blockers. Tom phones: she was shot by Nicklas. Nicklas knocks Eva out. Jörgen sews Storm's wound and feeds him jordskotts. Göran convinces Esmeralda to find Storm: he is after Ylva. Tom enters underground and later leads out the children. Gerda questions Eva, who says Nicklas will be arrested for her shooting. Gerda decides to kill Eva with car exhaust fumes. Gerda lies to Nicklas about her cancer, his father and sedating Eva. Storm enters a river where he is killed by the sjörå. Josefine asks Nicklas for her mother. He saves Eva, she tells him about Gerda's lies. Gerda confirms Eva's assertions. Nicklas convinces Gerda to stop blasting: Gerda dies. EN superior is ordered by his boss to care for Eva. Göran is sent to Canada for recuperation. Tom, Ida and Eva take Josefine to a forest clearing. Josefine becomes a plant. As they drive off Ida waves to Muns.

=== Series 2 (2017) ===
No.	Title	Directed by	Written by	UK air date	UK viewers (million)
1	"Del XI"	Daniel di Grado	Henrik Björn, Filip Hammarström, Gunnar Nilsson, Aron Levander, Lovisa Milles & Tatjana Andersson	19 October 2017	0.42
"Man under ice" (Leif) is seen; later he wanders Stockholm's streets. Eva and Bahar raid a drug dealer, Marcello. Eva chases Marcello but hallucinates about Josefine. Eva receives her potion supply from Ylva. Tom and Ida wish her happy birthday. Tom advises Eva to seek help for her visions. Jakob does not trust Eva: she's too impulsive. Eva and Ida find Leif near her flat. Leif's hospitalized; he was tortured: including tongue removed. Ylva teaches Nicklas about wildlife, they collect Josefine's jordskott. Rami patrols Silo, where Kalem is held. Eva asks Agneta to identify Leif but Agneta scolds Eva. Eva views CCTV: Leif exits the river; later "Dr Parker" (Dante) searches there. Kalem and Robin communicate via a vent, she's locked separately. At hospital Eva sees Dante attend Leif. Leif recognizes Agneta's name: he warns "the child will die." Eva tails Dante, who catches a train and goes to Silo. Eva calls Bahar for backup. Inside Eva finds Robin already taken. Eva is attacked by Tony but knocks him out and loses her gun. Rami put his gun to Eva's head but Kalem injures him by shooting Eva's gun. Leif walks along, he falls and shatters into stone pieces.
2	"Del XII"	Daniel di Grado	Henrik Björn, Filip Hammarström, Gunnar Nilsson, Aron Levander, Lovisa Milles & Tatjana Andersson	26 October 2017	N/A
Tony won't talk. Dante drives to an underpass; he tasers Robin. Agneta recognizes Leif on TV. She leaves her facility. Eva finds Agneta at Cafe Kärven and returns her. Gabriel updates Göran about Leif. Immigrants tell Eva that Rami sold their labor cheaply. Eva finds a rat and then a Spånga school top. Ulf identifies Robin's top, he remembers her affinity with rodents. Eva and Bahar interview Desirée, she's unsure where Robin went. Leif's body disappeared. Laila tells them: autopsy cannot proceed. Eva goes to Leif's room, Göran's cleaned up. Tony runs headlong into his cell door and kills himself. Maja presents butterflies at school; boys bully her. Linus phones Esmeralda: invites her to Stockholm. Esmeralda stops boys harassing Maja with motorbikes. Bahar phones Eva but she's going to Desirée's. Inside are Kalem and Desirée. Desirée aggressively waves a knife. Kalem holds Eva's gun, they struggle: Desirée is killed. Göran tells Eva to remove Kalem while he adjusts evidence. Göran shoots another gun and places it in Desirée's hand. He hides original bullet hole. Eva warns Göran before Bahar arrives. They say its suicide. Eva takes Kalem to her flat; Ida is visiting. Jörgen finds Ylva's notebook.
3	"Del XIII"	Jakob Ström	Henrik Björn, Lovisa Milles, Gunnar Nilsson, Aron Levander, Filip Hammarström & Tatjana Andersson	2 November 2017	0.24
Eva retrieves Kalem's backpack from Desirée's. Bahar wonders why Eva returned. Outside Eva's flat she sees Dante, who abandons his car. Eva phones Göran while pursuing on foot but Dante escapes. The car belongs to Zara, who lives near Cafe Kärven. Zara's flat has poisonous plants, keys and Agneta's typewriter. Lena hands over Agneta's postcards: they seem gibberish. Eva returns Agneta's typewriter and asks about Zara. Agneta remembers Zara grew sunflowers. Tom finds Maja's forest hideaway, nearby is a tranquilizer dart and Rami's mutilated head. Kalem fashions a metalwork dolphin for Ida. Tom meets Inge, they find Rami's body in a tree. Esmeralda and Maja sleep at the train station. Leif was seen near Sunflower allotments, where Zara has a hut. Eva and Göran detect eight bags with cremated bones. Bahar sees them leave. Esmeralda and Maja hitch a train. Inge claims Rami cannot be identified. Tom doubts Inge's report. Bahar and Jakob search Zara's hut: find nothing. Jörgen reads Ylva's book to raise the dead using Eddie's remains. Eva asks Lena to keep Kalem safe. Esmeralda and Maja were photographed at the station. Jörgen threatens Nicklas to tell him where Esmeralda hides. Agneta types without inserting paper.
4	"Del XIV"	Jakob Ström	Henrik Björn, Gunnar Nilsson & Aron Levander	9 November 2017	N/A
At EN's HQ, Göran researches rituals. Gabriel gives Göran a potion. Eva and Göran descend a stairway. They find a birth tag and Zara's name badge. Esmeralda and Maja discover a man, Micke. Eddie kills Klara: Jörgen buries her. Kalem uses Roffe's computer to access Silo's videos: Tony and Rami put Robin in a removalist's van. Dante drives it. Bahar spots a shifted picture at Desirée's: behind is another bullet. Eva and Göran follow Zara. Downstairs they find a dead baby. Tom takes Rami's fingerprints. Mickey knocks out Esmeralda. Eva searches for a missing baby: none are gone. Micke attempts to rape Maja, Esmeralda wakes and attacks him with her powers. Bahar asks Stefan to analyse the bullet. Zara throws sleep dust at Eva and re-takes the baby. Tom identified Rami. He signs Inge's false report. Micke is left bloodied and terrified. Esmeralda messages Klara: she's staying with Linus. Bahar analyses the bullet: it matches Eva's gun. Göran tells Gabriel the trail leads to Zara. Eva finds a photo dated April 1988: Zara was a Silverhöjd midwife. Tom visits Eva but she shoves him away. Eva confronts Agneta but collapses. Gabriel offers Tom EN membership. Agneta drives Eva to Thörnblad estate.
5	"Del XV"	Jakob Ström	Henrik Björn & Gunnar Nilsson	16 November 2017	N/A
Agneta restrains Eva after nightmares. Lena tells Kalem she's minding his money. Tom informs Göran of Rami's death and Inge's cover-ups. Eva finds jordskott spreading: she's run out of potion. Pekka gives Eva pain relief and takes Agneta's MRI. Bahar queries Desirée's autoposy but Laila disagrees. Göran and Tom substitute Bahar's bullet before Stefan's examination. Ida accesses Tom's computer: finds Lasse's address. Pekka recognises Zara as Jorun. Bahar fumes when the bullets do not match. Jakob castigates Bahar for interfering: she should relocate to Trafficking. Agneta rearranges typewriter keys and sings to a cassette. Agneta's MRI shows she was misdiagnosed. Tom visits Linus' place but gets no answer. Jörgen and Eddie wait outside. Silverhöjd journalist, Ruben shows Eva the article by Agneta and Leif. Ruben also gives Agneta's old files. Agneta identifies Leif as "man under ice." Tom agrees to join EN and asks Gabriel to find Maja. Ylva's shocked Eva's used six months of potion. Eva puts her hand in soil: jordskott calms. Ylva provides a concentrated dose. Potion includes Muns' blood. Leif was of Muns' people: they become stone after death. Ylva takes Eva to Josefine: Eva should embrace visions. In a corridor Maja's tasered by Dante.
6	"Del XVI"	Henrik Björn	Henrik Björn, Filip Hammarström, Lovisa Milles, Gunnar Nilsson, Aron Levander & Tatjana Andersson	23 November 2017	N/A
Eva's potion uses Muns' blood: what's in Göran's? Stefan compares Leif's blood with Göran's potion. Lasse leads Kalem and Ida to Rami's flat. Tom transfers to Jakob's squad. Esmeralda is captured by Jörgen and Eddie. Dante's identified as Maja's abductor. Maja wakes, Robin has a taser wound. Dante and Zara enter the area. Bahar confronts Eva about her bullets. Eva acknowledges Josefine as the best thing in her life. Ida and Kalem find a circled location on Rami's map. Bahar catches an Amazon Angel, (Note: Chorinea amazon, or Amazon Angel, is a real-life butterfly from French Guiana and Brazil. Its larval attributes regarding brain eating, as used in Jordskott, are fictional.) from Tony's body bag. Agneta writes using modified keys matching her code. Agneta and Eva watch Leif's videotape: his people dying from construction overhead. Gabriel tells Tom: Dante's a killer and bring him to EN. Agneta leads Eva to Northern Link, where Leif's people died. Eva decodes Agneta's postcards, "Sorry Eva. Love you. Miss you." Tom's inducted into EN. Jörgen keeps Esmeralda in his shed, Frank visits and frees her. Frank's killed with a screwdriver; then Jörgen's stabbed. Eva finds Svente's article on Northern Link's ancient graves. Göran's audiotape describes Inge using a larva on Agneta, causing paranoia, memory loss and hatred of Eva. Göran wanted Leif's people protected, which Agneta could expose. He believes EN will kill Agneta.
7	"Del XVII"	Henrik Björn	Henrik Björn, Filip Hammarström, Lovisa Milles, Gunnar Nilsson, Aron Levander & Tatjana Andersson	30 November 2017	N/A
Tom follows Ida into her school: Dante approaches Ida and Kalem. Tom arrests Dante. Esmeralda and Nicklas bring an injured Jörgen to Ylva, who saves him. Tom aggressively questions Dante. Esmeralda return's Ylva's notebook. Eva and Göran ask Sussie about baby Olivia who nearly died. Olivia recovered under Zara's care. Bahar researches Amazon Angel, which produces larvae that digest brains. Agneta follows a raven to the hospital. Bahar tells Laila about the butterfly. Laila asks to study it. Eva encounters Agneta and Zara in the hospital basement. Göran recognizes Dante as a former EN colleague. Dante agrees to take them to the women. Tom and Inge listen until Göran turns audio off. Göran orders Tom to meet around back. Gabriel threatens Bahar's children to drop investigations. Zara explains she replaced dead babies with changelings from Leif's people. EN harmed Leif's people and Agneta. Dante takes Tom and Göran to Robin and Maja: they are okay. Three changelings were identified by EN: third is Ida. Tom phones Petra but Ida's gone. Inge shoots Dante and orders Tom to burn Dante's body. Karem and Ida find Leif's chair, where he was bled dry. Ida enters Leif's cell: its door slams shut.
8	"Del XVIII"	Henrik Björn	Henrik Björn, Filip Hammarström, Lovisa Milles, Gunnar Nilsson, Aron Levander & Tatjana Andersson	7 December 2017	N/A
Tom prints Göran's DNA comparison: 100% match. Göran meets Gabriel and José and tells them EN's potion used Leif's blood. Gabriel dismisses it as mistaken. Göran leaves a phone in Gabriel's car. José is shot, Gabriel phones Inge foisting blame onto Göran. Eva and Laila drink tea: discussing Bahar's butterfly. Jörgen acknowledges he killed Frank as Eddie's dead. Jörgen promises Esmeralda he hurt no others. Göran phones Inge to bring Agneta and meet. Eva sees brain-feeding larvae. She's been drugged with a neurotoxin. At the quarry, Göran reveals Jesajah. Laila buries Eva in a pit. Pekka phones Tom: Laila checked Maja's and Ida's records. Kalem freed himself, attacks Laila but he's electrocuted. Gabriel sees Laila's lab: she lied about Leif. Gabriel agrees to escape EN with Laila and bring Ida. Josefine tells Eva she will wait: Eva has to save Ida. Eva attacks Laila choking her. Gabriel swaps Ida for Laila. He takes Laila and drives off. Eva and Ida believe Kalem's dying. Tom saves Kalem with a jordskott. Inge meets Gabriel, who is unable, to lie: Jesajah's nearby. Esmeralda learns Jörgen killed Klara; she rages uncontrollably and forces him to kill himself. EN's Master punishes Gabriel: he's planted in a garden box.

== Reception ==
International reviews were positive and praised the way in which the story was told over the course of the series. The New York Times called Jordskott "a police procedural with elements of contagion thriller and vampire tale," which is arranged "so adroitly that it requires surprisingly little suspension of disbelief." The Irish Examiner enjoyed how the show "slowly starts to weave subtle elements of Norse mythology into the story." The Guardian agreed, writing that the focus on mythology set Jordskott apart from other shows.
