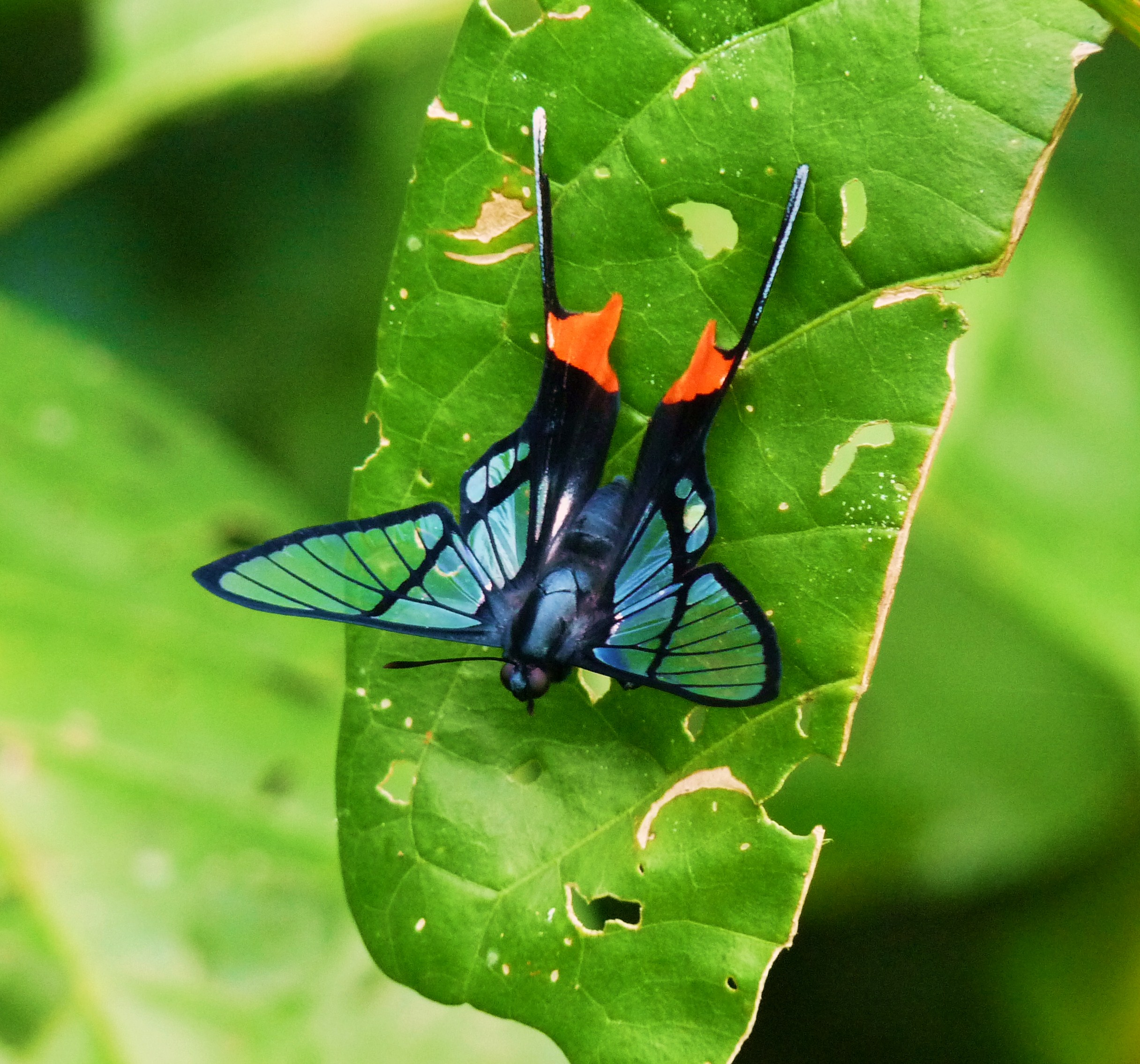
- Chorinea octauius

Scientific classification
- Domain: Eukaryota
- Kingdom: Animalia
- Phylum: Arthropoda
- Class: Insecta
- Order: Lepidoptera
- Family: Riodinidae
- Tribe: Riodinini
- Genus: Chorinea; Gray, 1832

Synonyms
- Zeonia Swainson, [1833]; Ethelida Westwood, 1851 (unavailable name)

= Chorinea =

Genus of butterflies

Chorinea is a Neotropical metalmark butterfly genus.

== Species ==
Listed alphabetically:

- Chorinea amazon (Saunders, 1859) French Guiana, Brazil
- Chorinea batesii (Saunders, 1859) French Guiana, Brazil
- Chorinea bogota (Saunders, 1859) Guatemala, Colombia
- Chorinea gratiosa Stichel, 1910 Ecuador
- Chorinea heliconides (Swainson, [1833]) Brazil
- Chorinea licursis (Fabricius, 1775)
- Chorinea octauius (Fabricius, 1787) – octauius swordtail
- Chorinea sylphina (Bates, 1868) – sylphina angel

== Pinned specimens ==
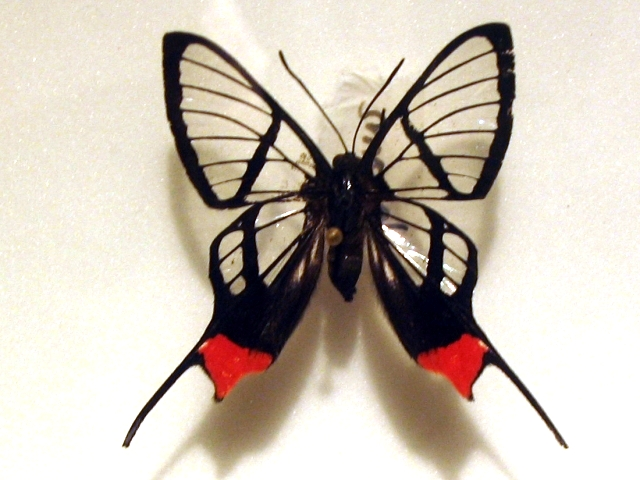
Chorinea octauius

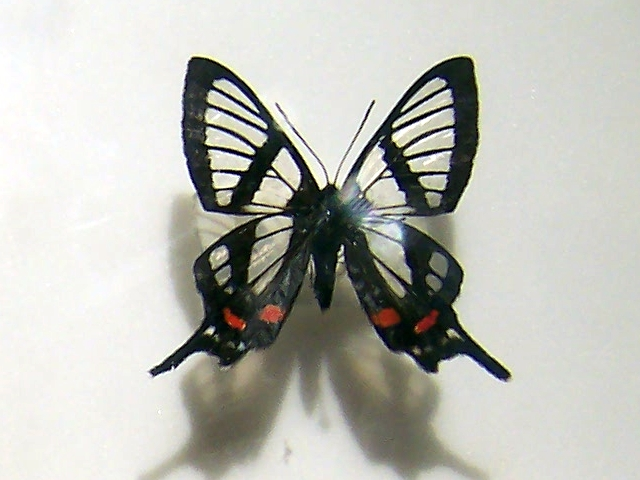
Chorinea sylphina
