= Moa Gammel =

Swedish actress

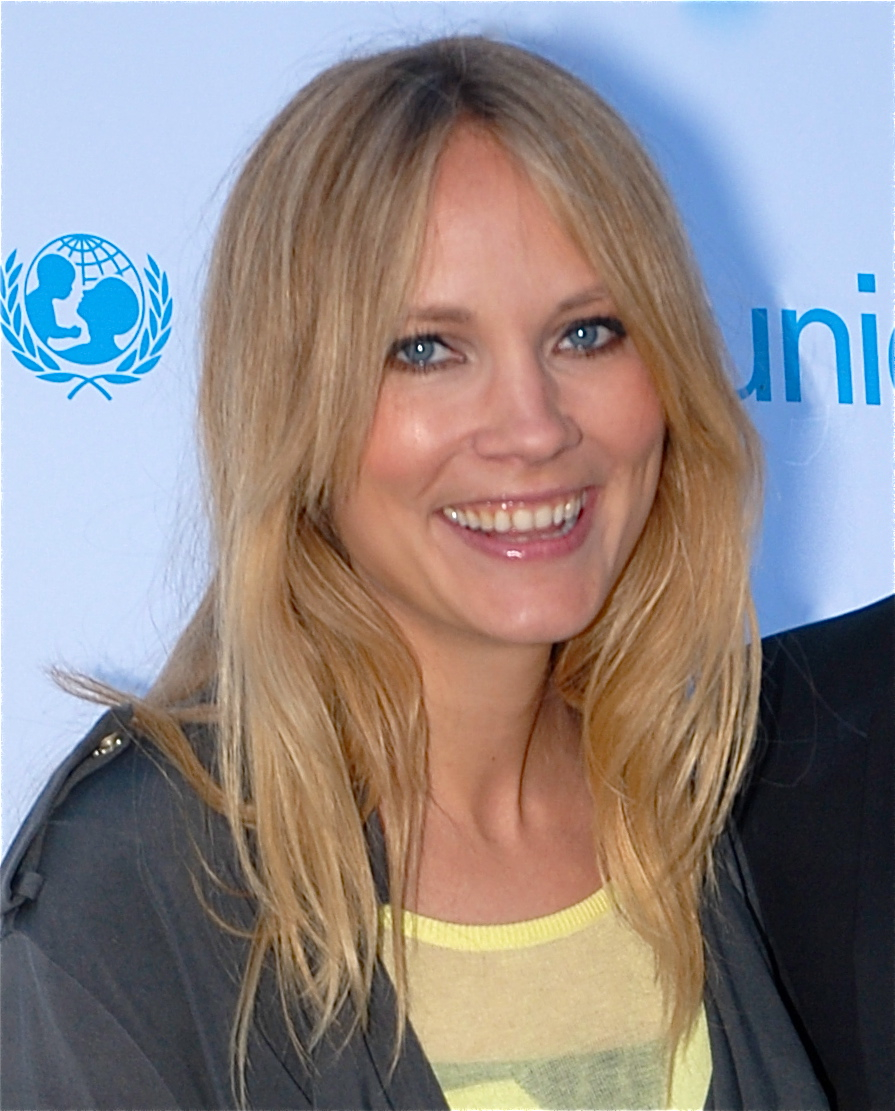
- Moa Gammel (2012)
- Born: Moa Tuva Amanda Gammel; 6 October 1980 (age 44); Stockholm, Sweden
- Occupation: Actress

Moa Tuva Amanda Gammel (born 6 October 1980) is a Swedish actress. She made her acting debut in the 1996 Mikael Håfström film Skuggornas hus and then acted in the soap opera Vita lögner on TV3. Her breakthrough came in the 2006 film by Johan Brisinger called Underbara Älskade. She also had roles in Sommaren med Göran in 2009 opposite David Hellenius. In 2015, she had a lead role in the drama series Jordskott.

== Filmography ==
=== Films ===
- 1999: Sherdil
- 2003: Jesus från Hökarängen
- 2005: Barn av vår tid
- 2006: Underbara älskade
- 2007: Beck – Det tysta skriket
- 2007: Teater Pseudo - Sex
- 2007: Pyramiden
- 2007: Ungdomens förfarare
- 2008: Pälsen
- 2009: Sommaren med Göran
- 2010: A-kassekungen
- 2010: Att sträcka ut en hand
- 2010: Juni
- 2010: Lapland Odyssey
- 2010: Puss
- 2011: Umeå4ever
- 2012: Prime Time
- 2013: Hemma
- 2014: Kärlek deluxe
- 2014: Tommy

=== TV series ===
- 1994: Bullen
- 1995: Du bestämmer
- 1996: Skuggornas hus
- 2000–2001: Vita lögner
- 2000: Pusselbitar
- 2000: Labyrinten
- 2000: Brottsvåg
- 2007: Ett gott parti
- 2008: Oskyldigt dömd
- 2009: Livet i Fagervik
- 2011: Irene Huss series
  - Irene Huss: En man med litet ansikte
  - Irene Huss: Den som vakar i mörkret
  - Irene Huss: Det lömska nätet
  - Irene Huss: I skydd av skuggorna
  - Irene Huss: Jagat vittne
  - Irene Huss: Tystnadens cirkel
- 2015: Jordskott
- 2017: Jordskott II
- 2024: Jana: Marked for Life

== Theatre ==
- 1992: Pippi Långstrump as Annika
