= Parneviks =

- Genre: Reality television
- Starring: Jesper Parnevik; Mia Parnevik; Peg Parnevik; Penny Parnevik; Philippa Parnevik; Phoenix Parnevik
- Country of origin: Sweden
- Original language: Swedish
- No. of seasons: 4
- No. of episodes: 15

Production
- Production locations: Jupiter, Florida, U.S.

Original release
- Network: TV3
- Release: 16 March 2015 – 2018

Parneviks is a Swedish show that is broadcast on TV3. It features golfer Jesper Parnevik and his family as they welcome celebrity guests to stay at their mansion in Florida for a few days. It won the Kristallen award in 2015 for Best Reality series. Jesper Parnevik's wife Mia Parnevik won the award for Television Personality of the Year at the same award show.
