= Norra Skåne =

Local newspaper published in Sweden

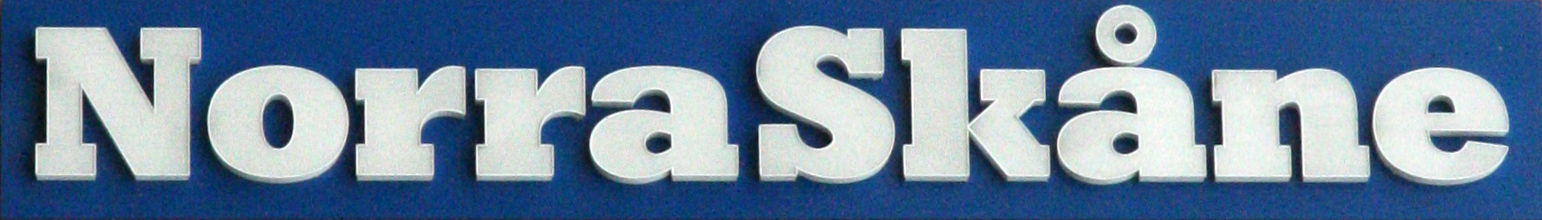
- Type: Daily newspaper
- Format: Tabloid
- Founded: 1899; 127 years ago
- Language: Swedish
- Headquarters: Hässleholm
- Country: Sweden
- Website: Norra Skåne

Norra Skåne is a local newspaper based in Hässleholm, Sweden. The paper has been in circulation since 1899.

== History and profile ==
Norra Skåne was established in 1899. The headquarters of the paper is in Hässleholm. It serves a small community in the region of Göinge, southern Sweden. The paper and its website provide news which is mostly of local interest. It is published six times per week in tabloid format.

From its start in 1899 to 1920 Norra Skåne was among the liberal newspapers in the country. The paper was one of the Swedish publications which employed the materials provided by the United States Information Agency for their editorials in the Cold War period, particularly in the 1950s and 1960s. During the 1960s it was affiliated with the Agrarian Party. In 1998 the paper became part of the Ander group.
