= Sven Plex Petersson =

Swedish sports journalist

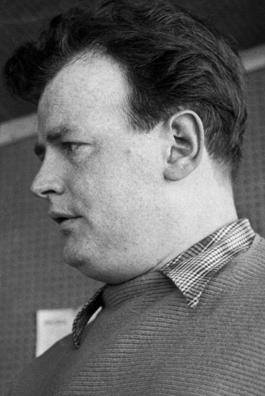
- Sven Plex Petersson in 1958
- Born: Per Sven Pettersson; 7 August 1926; Lit, Sweden
- Died: 25 June 2011 (aged 84); Lidingö, Sweden
- Occupation: Sports journalist
- Spouse: Marianne Arnesson (m. 1956)
- Children: 3

Sven Plex Petersson, registered as Per Sven Pettersson (Note: The lastname is spelled Pettersson in the civil registration, while it is specified as Petersson in other sources, including Vem är vem?) (7 August 1926 – 25 June 2011)) was a Swedish sports journalist, active for Sveriges Radio and Sveriges Television. He was employed by Sveriges Radio in 1957.

== Early life ==
Petersson was born on 7 August 1926 in Lit, Sweden, the son of Fritz Petersson, a manufacturer, and Carin (née Johansson).

== Career ==
Petersson worked for Östersunds-Posten from 1944 to 1956, and Sveriges Radio/TV from 1957. Petersson worked for the Swedish radio's sports editorial section from 1957 to 1959 and Sveriges Television's sports editorial section from 1959. Some memorable moments from his time as a commentator included Ingemar Stenmark's alpine career - and made Sweden stand still during the live broadcasts. He also commented on classic moments such as Bob Beamon's long jump of 8.90 in the 1968 Summer Olympics and Anders Gärderud's gold in the 3,000 meter hurdles in the 1976 Summer Olympics. Petersson was also known for commenting on the ski jumping from Garmisch-Partenkirchen every New Year's day.

== Personal life ==
In 1956, Petersson married Marianne Arnesson (born 1927), the daughter of Albin Arnesson and Märta (née Pålsson). They had three children; Per (born 1957), Karin (born 1959), and Ulf (born 1961).

== Bibliography ==
- Petersson, Sven; Benson, Sverker (1964). TV-guide 1964 års OS i Innsbruck 29/1-9/2 (in Swedish). Älvsjö: Bröd. Benson. SELIBR 1245957.
- Petersson, Sven (1968). Sven "Plex" Petersson ser på skidåret -68 (in Swedish). Malmö: Kristall-förl. SELIBR 1466568.
- Petersson, Sven; Benson, Sverker (1968). Vinterolympisk TV-guide: [1968 års OS i Grenoble 6/2-18/2] (in Swedish). Älvsjö: Bröd. Benson. SELIBR 1245999.
- Petersson, Sven; Hård af Segerstad, Ulf (1972). 50 Vasalopp (in Swedish). Stockholm: utg. ISBN 9152213137. SELIBR 7409464.
- Petersson, Sven; Norman, Bertil, eds. (1972). Tävlingsorientering. D. 4, Orienteringsteknik (in Swedish). Stockholm: Utg. SELIBR 1345344.
- Petersson, Sven (1974). Vasaloppet: världens största skidtävling (in Swedish). Stockholm: Sveriges Radios förlag. ISBN 91-522-1398-6. SELIBR 7409499.
- Petersson, Sven, ed. (1976). Olympiska sommarspelen 1976 Montreal (in Swedish). Stockholm: Södra distributionscentralen AB. SELIBR 128402.
- Petersson, Sven, ed. (1976). Olympiska vinterspelen 1976 Innsbruck (in Swedish). Stockholm: Centrum distributions AB. SELIBR 128404.
- Nilsson, Bengt Herman; Petersson, Sven, eds. (1983). 60 vasalopp: en bok om det kungliga skidloppet mellan Sälen och Mora (in Swedish). Bjästa: Cewe-förl. ISBN 9175421089. SELIBR 7647019.
- Kjellström, Björn; Petersson, Sven, eds. (1983). 75 år på skidor: Svenska skidförbundet 1908-1983 : en jubileumsbok (in Swedish). Bjästa: CeWe-förl. ISBN 9175420880. SELIBR 7646999.
- Glanell, Tomas; Pettersson, Ulf; Petersson, Sven, eds. (1993–1995). De moderna olympiska spelen: IOK 100 år (in Swedish). Vällingby: Strömberg/Brunnhage. SELIBR 1769661.
- Glanell, Tomas; Pettersson, Ulf; Petersson, Sven, eds. (1993). De moderna olympiska spelen: IOK 100 år. D. 1, 1896-1912 (in Swedish). Vällingby: Strömberg/Brunnhage. ISBN 91-86184-40-7. SELIBR 1769663.
- Glanell, Tomas; Pettersson, Ulf; Petersson, Sven, eds. (1993). De moderna olympiska spelen: IOK 100 år. D. 2, 1920-1932 (in Swedish). Vällingby: Strömberg/Brunnhage. ISBN 91-86184-41-5. SELIBR 1769664.
- Glanell, Tomas; Pettersson, Ulf; Petersson, Sven, eds. (1995). De moderna olympiska spelen: IOK 100 år. D. 3, 1936-1956 (in Swedish). Vällingby: Strömberg/Brunnhage. SELIBR 1769662.
