= Oliver Boberg =

German artist

Oliver Boberg (born 1965) is a German artist, working with photography and video, whose work has been exhibited internationally. Mainly reflecting on the process of creating and recalling memories, Boberg's works are in the collections of institutions such as the Victoria & Albert Museum ( London, England) and the Museum of Modern Art (New York, NY).
