= Peg Parnevik =

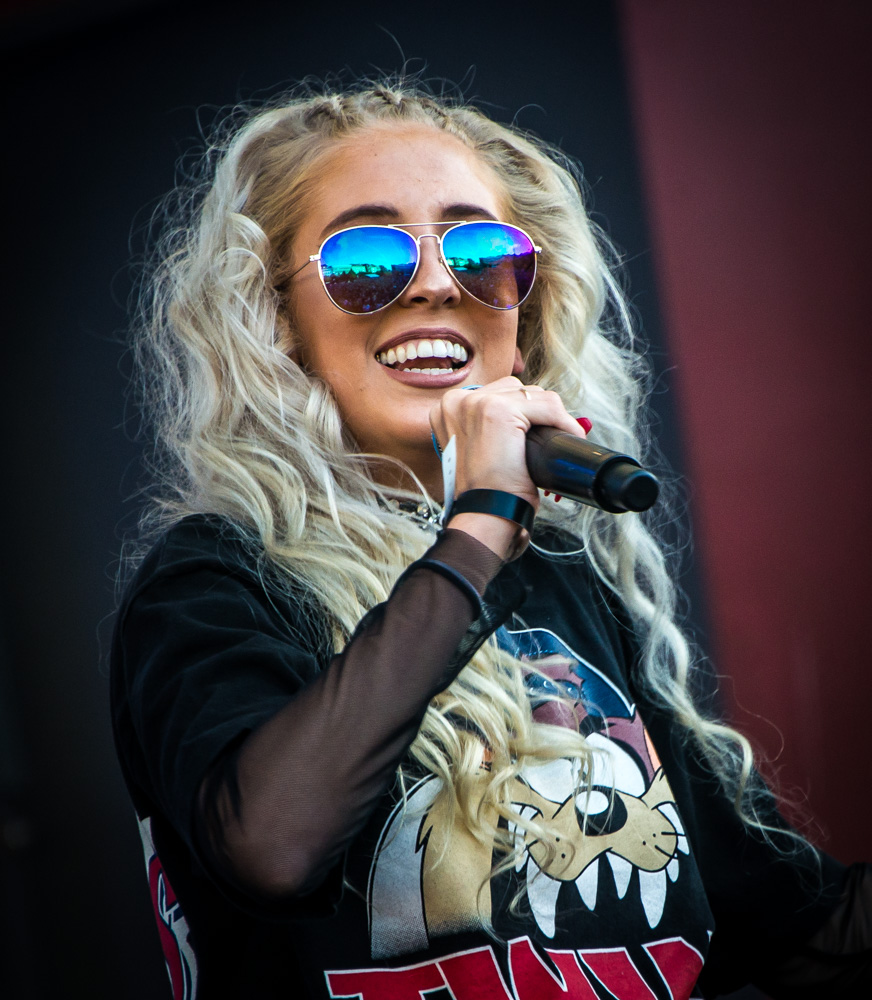
- Parnevik in 2016.

Background information
- Born: Ida Josefin Peg Parnevik; 3 September 1995 (age 30); Stockholm, Sweden
- Genres: Pop
- Occupations: Singer; songwriter; television personality
- Years active: 2015–present
- Label: Sony

Ida Josefin Peg Parnevik (born 3 September 1995) is a Swedish-American singer, songwriter, and television personality. She is known for starring in the Swedish reality show Parneviks (2015–2018) mainly broadcast from their home in Jupiter, Florida.

== Life and career ==
=== Early life ===
Parnevik was born in Stockholm to professional golfer Jesper Parnevik and his wife Mia. She has three younger siblings; Penny, Philippa, and Phoenix and was raised in Jupiter, Florida, in the United States. Her paternal grandfather is Swedish impersonator Bosse Parnevik. She attended The Pine School in Hobe Sound. She spent her freshman year of college at Washington and Lee University in Lexington, Virginia. She then enrolled at Savannah College of Art and Design in Savannah, Georgia.

=== 2015–present: Parneviks and music career ===
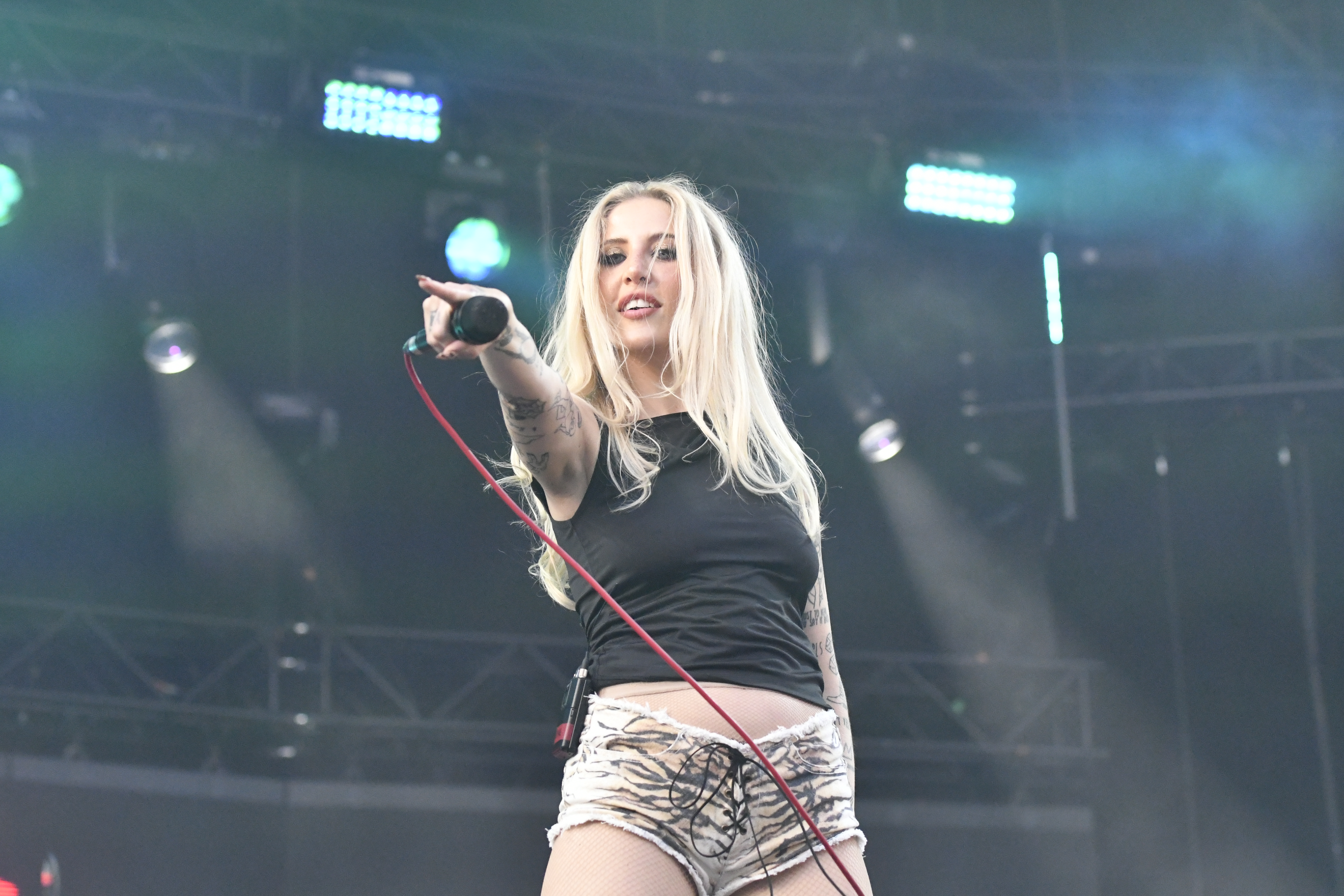
Peg Parnevik in 2024.

In 2015, Parnevik began starring in the reality show Parneviks broadcast on the Swedish television channel TV3. The show features Parnevik and the rest of her family welcoming Swedish celebrity guests to stay at their Florida mansion. It has won numerous awards in Sweden, including a Kristallen in 2015 for Best Reality Series. Parnevik later signed to Sony Music Sweden as a solo artist and released her debut single "Ain't No Saint" in March 2016. On 3 June 2016, she released the single "We Are (Ziggy & Carola)".

Her song Ain't No Saint charted in second place on the Swedish singleschart. In August 2016 Parnevik participated in Allsång på Skansen broadcast on SVT. She also had her own reality show called Peg på turné to be broadcast on TV3, a show that will follow her way through Sweden when she promotes her new songs.

Parnevik was a judge on Idol 2024, broadcast on TV4.

== Discography ==
=== Albums ===
List of albums, with selected details and chart positions
Title	Album details	Peak chart positions
Title	Album details	SWE
Äldsta barnet	Released: 10 October 2025; Label: Warner Music Sweden; Formats: CD, digital download	17

=== Singles ===
List of singles, with selected chart positions
Year	Title	Peak positions	Album
Year	Title	SWE	Album
2016	"Ain't No Saint"	2	Non-album singles
2016	"We Are (Ziggy & Carola)"	38	Non-album singles
2016	"Sthlm Nights"	43	Non-album singles
2017	"Don't Tell Ma"	79	Don't Tell Ma EP
2018	"Loafers"	51	Non-album singles
2018	"Break Up a Bit"	72	Non-album singles
2019	"Goodbye Boy"	48	Non-album singles
2019	"27 Sorries"	— (Note: "27 Sorries" did not enter the Swedish Singellista Chart, but peaked at number three on the Swedish Heatseeker Chart.)	Non-album singles
2020	"Bad Bitch"	93	Non-album singles
2021	"Somewhere Without Me"	79	Non-album singles
2021	"Tears"	— (Note: "Tears" did not enter the Swedish Singellista Chart, but peaked at number 14 on the Swedish Heatseeker Chart.)	Non-album singles
2023	"Misslyckad & hatad"	37	Non-album singles
2023	"Penny"	20	Non-album singles
2023	"Som en vän" (with Bell)	77	Non-album singles
2023	"Vart jag mig i världen vänder"	— (Note: "Vart jag mig i världen vänder" did not enter the Swedish Singellista Chart, but peaked at number three on the Swedish Heatseeker Chart.)	Non-album singles
2023	"Bättre nu (The Wedding)"	1	Non-album singles
2023	"Vi är tjejer, vi är bäst"	— (Note: "Vi är tjejer, vi är bäst" did not enter the Swedish Singellista Chart, but peaked at number five on the Swedish Heatseeker Chart.)	Non-album singles
2023	"Stockholm"	58	Non-album singles
2024	"Svett"	67	Non-album singles
2024	"Hus utan speglar"	— (Note: "Hus utan speglar" did not enter the Swedish Singellista Chart, but peaked at number five on the Swedish Heatseeker Chart.)	Äldsta barnet
2025	"Jag har hört (Hahaha)"	84	Äldsta barnet

=== Other charted songs ===
List of other charted songs, with selected chart positions
Year	Title	Peak positions	Album
Year	Title	SWE	Album
2025	"Spelar ingen roll"	81	Äldsta barnet

== Filmography ==
=== Television ===
Year	Title	Role
2015–2018	Parneviks	Herself; main cast
2015	Parneviks firar jul	Herself
2024	Idol	Jury
