= Carina Boberg =

Swedish actress (1952–2020)

Carina Helen Boberg (12 May 1952 – 31 May 2020) was a Swedish actress, perhaps best known for her starring role in the TV4 comedy series Rena Rama Rolf as "Bettan" opposite Lasse Brandeby.

Boberg was born in Gothenburg. She graduated from the Gothenburg Theatre Academy in 1978. She was hired by Gothenburg City Theatre after her graduation in 1983, and was part of the permanent acting staff at that theatre from 1983 until 2019. She also made guest appearances on the stage at other Swedish theatres, including Dalateatern, Uppsala Stadsteater, and Östgötateatern.

Boberg was married to actor Göran Ragnerstam.

== Filmography ==
- 1994–1998 – Rena rama Rolf (TV series)
- 1997 – Skallgång
- 1997 – Glappet (TV series)
- 2000 – Soldater i månsken (TV series)
- 2001 – Bekännelsen
- 2002 – Suxxess
- 2002 – Skeppsholmen (TV series)
- 2003 – Miffo
- 2003 – Kopps
- 2003 – En ö i havet (TV series)
- 2004 – Lokalreportern (TV series)
