= Paul Boberg =

South African legal scholar

Paul Q. R. Boberg was a South African legal scholar who worked at the University of the Witwatersrand. His two textbooks, The Law of Persons and the Family (1977) and The Law of Delict, vol 1: Aquilian Liability (1984), both written in casebook style and published by Juta & Co Ltd, are often considered the best in their field. From 1959 to 1975, Boberg wrote the "Law of Delict" section of the Annual Survey of South African Law, and later became the editor of the publication.

In the conflict between the South African legal system's twin influences, English and Roman-Dutch, Boberg was notably non-partisan or pragmatic, and his work is often credited with even-handedly synthesizing the two.

Boberg taught delict to the torts scholar Harold Luntz. His father, a police colonel during apartheid, failed to prevent Bob Hepple's flight from South Africa at the time of the Rivonia Trial.
