= Jia Ruhan =

Chinese soprano

Jia Ruhan 贾茹涵
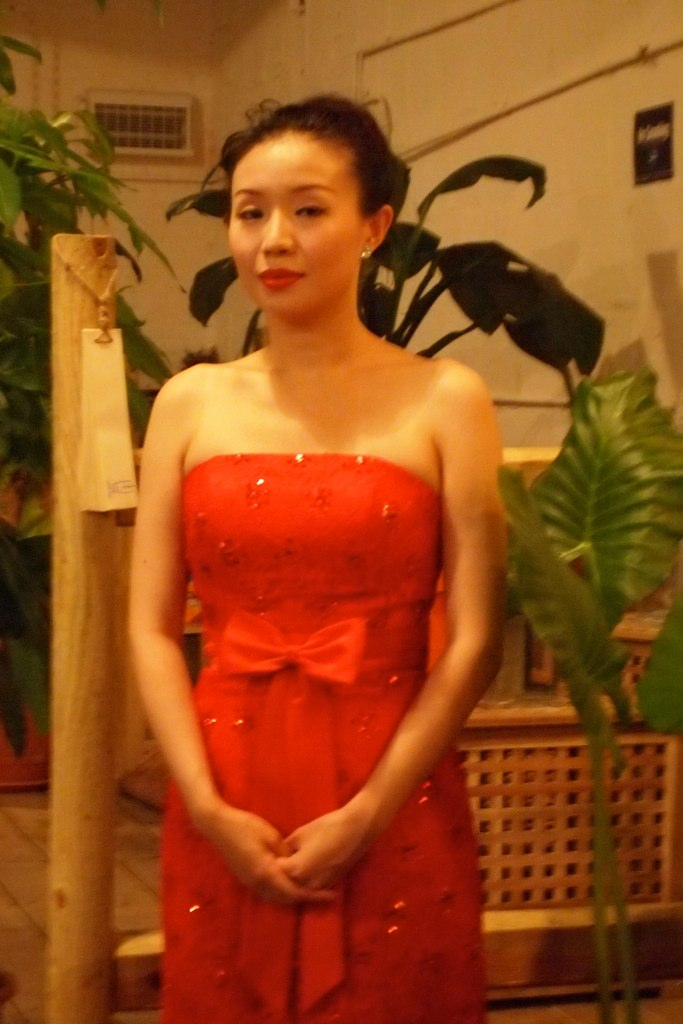
- Jia Ruhan in 2012.

Background information
- Born: Jia Ruhan; Shijiazhuang
- Origin: China
- Website: www.ruhanmusic.com

Jia Ruhan (Chinese: 贾茹涵) is a Chinese soprano who performs in plays, as well as in musicals, films, and solo recitals. She was born in Shijiazhuang and graduated with a Bachelor of Arts degree from the Shanghai Conservatory of Music.

She sang the roles of Queen Mother of Heaven and Guan Yin in the world premiere performance of Damon Albarn's rock opera, Monkey: Journey To The West on 28 June 2007 at the Palace Theatre, Manchester and later reprised the roles at the Théâtre du Châtelet in Paris in September and October of that year. In March 2008, she recorded the BBC Olympic Theme Song for the 2008 Beijing Olympic Games, also composed by Albarn.

== Awards and prizes ==
In May 2009, she won the First Prize at the XVIII edition of the Discovery International Pop Music Festival in Varna. The following July, she won the Second Prize in the solo vocal competition at the Llangollen International Eisteddfod (UK).

In July 2009, American Chinese producer, Christopher Tin, invited Ruhan to record on his debut album “Calling All Dawns”, which won two Grammys at the 53rd Annual Grammy Awards: Best Classical Crossover Album, and Best Instrumental Arrangement Accompanying Vocalists. In 2011, Ruhan signed with Shanghai Synergy Culture & Entertainment Group (SSCEG) and a-Peer Synergy Culture & Technology Co., Ltd.

In February 2013, Ruhan won the Best Album Award at the 4th China Outstanding Audio Awards.

== Recordings ==
- Christopher Tin: Calling All Dawns (Track 3:"Dao Zai Fan") Label: Tin Works .
- Damon Albarn: Monkey: Journey To The West. Label: Chrysalis Music.
- Iggy Strange Dahl, Johan Moraeu, Erik Lewander: Time to Grow, Label: Shanghai Synergy Culture & Entertainment Group Co., Ltd.
- Pavle Kovacevic, René Möckel, Sylvain Gourlay, Huang Hui: Smile, featured artists: The Italian Tenors & I QUATTRO Label: 13 Bis Music & a-Peer Synergy Shanghai Culture & Technology Co., Ltd.

== See also ==
- Chinese culture
