= Bosse Parnevik =

Swedish impersonator, revue artist and comedian

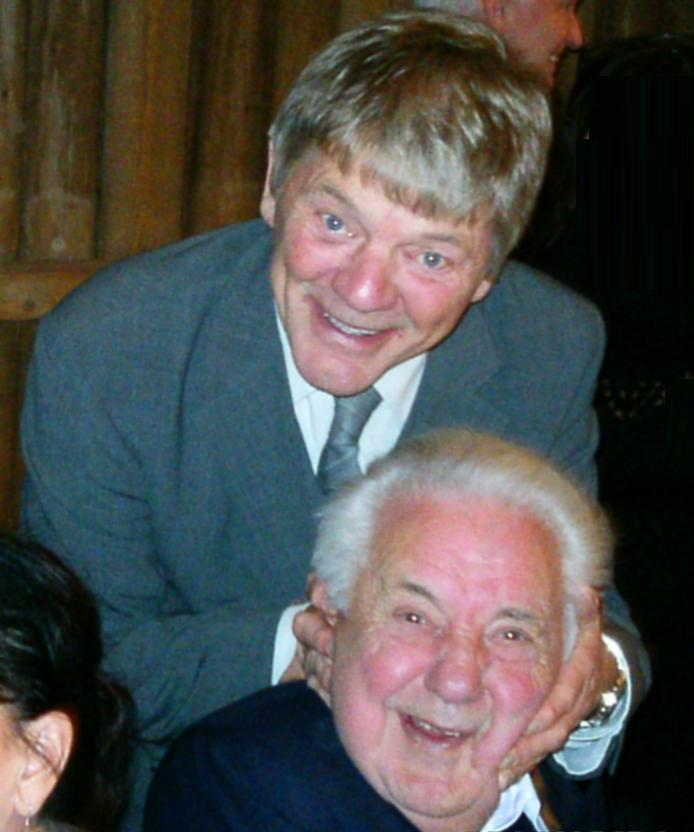
Parnevik (top) with actor Bert-Åke Varg near Stockholm in 2014.

Bo Sigfrid ("Bosse") Parnevik (born 20 March 1938, in Gothenburg) is a Swedish impersonator, revue artist and comedian. He is member of Lokalrevyer i Sverige and gives the Parnevik Scholarship to good revue artists every year. His son is professional golfer Jesper Parnevik.

== Biography and career ==
Parnevik moved with his family from Gothenburg to Munkfors when he was 2 years old. There, he started his career as an artist by performing imitations at youth clubs as a teenager. He debuted on a TV program that was broadcast from Nalen in Stockholm on 31 December 1957, together with artists such as Charlie Norman, Ingemar Johansson and Povel Ramel.

Parnevik was a good athlete and moved to Stockholm where he studied to be a gymnastic director. His talent became well-known after his performance at the Folkparkernas Artistforum in Västerås in 1959. He appeared on the radio program Karusellen in 1963 and on the TV program Hvar fjortonde dag from 1965 to 1967. By the late 60s, Parnevik was so established that he did about 300 performances at folkparks from May to September. In 1971, he made his first TV program Harpsundspartaj. From 1978 to 1979, he hosted Party hos Parnevik, which became very popular.

His most memorable performances were when he prank called entertainment programs and spoke in another person's voice. Besides this, he was skilled in wearing masks which made him look like another person, such as Magnus Härenstam, Bengt Bedrup, Sven-Bertil Taube, Lennart Bodström, Olof Palme and Ingemar Mundebo.

Together with Hasse Wallman, Parnevik later established himself as restaurateur and bought restaurants in Stockholm such as Bacchi Wapen. Later he was partner of Chinateatern, where he performed in his first revue show Parneviks revyparty, along with Siw Malmkvist, Lars Amble and Grynet Molvig, among others. In 1987, he performed the revue Parneviks Oscarsparty at Oscarsteatern. From 1993 to 1994, he performed Parneviks Cirkusparty at the Cirkus in Stockholm.

In November 2007, his revue Parneviks gubbröra premiered at Maximteatern.
