= Infinite discography =

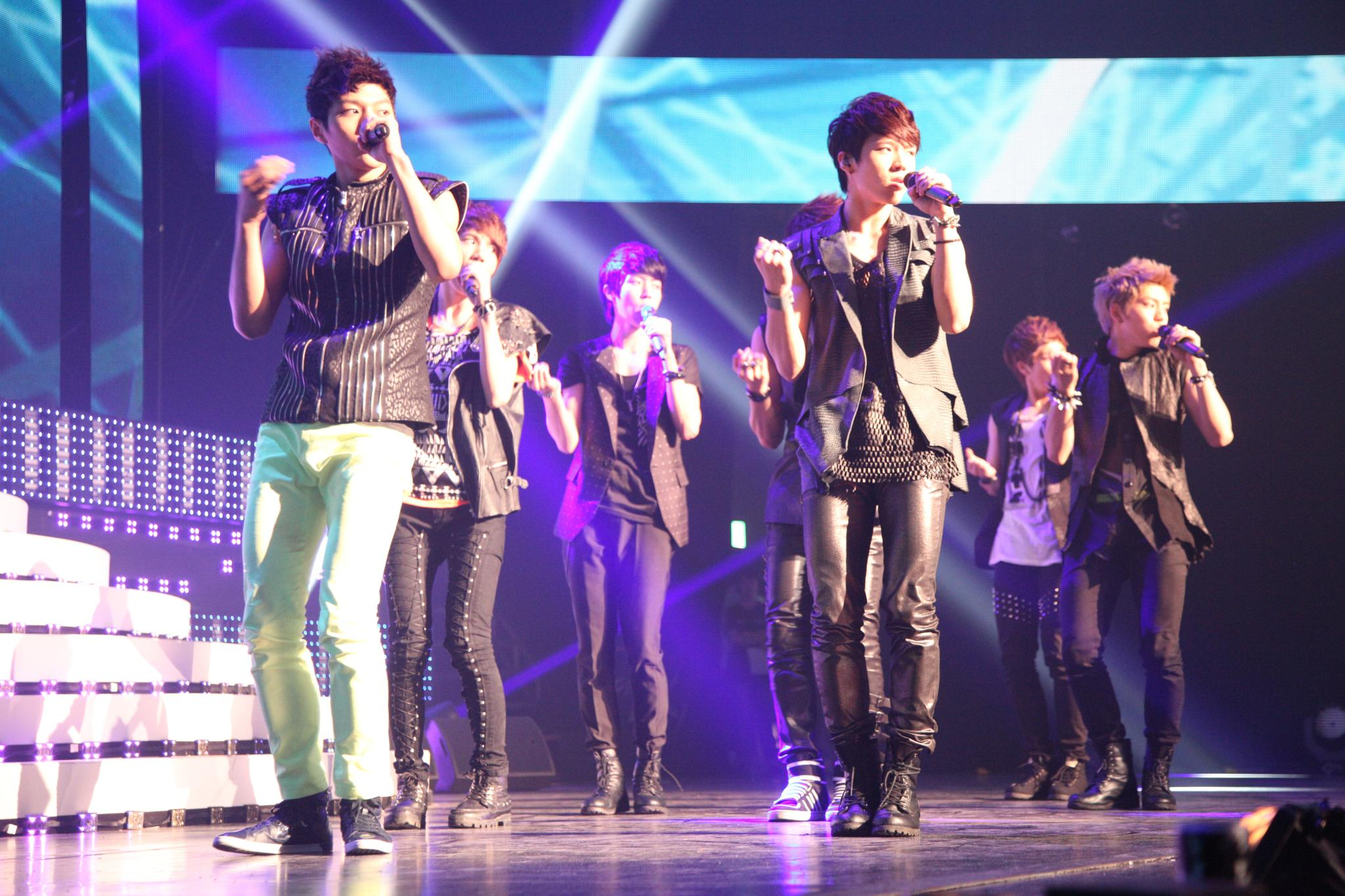
- Studio albums: 6
- Extended plays: 8
- Soundtrack albums: 4
- Live albums: 2
- Compilation albums: 2
- Singles: 29
- Video albums: 17
- Music videos: 47
- Single albums: 2

South Korean boy group Infinite has released six studio albums, two compilation albums, two live albums, two reissues, eight extended plays, two single albums, and twenty-nine singles. The group debuted in South Korea in June 2010 with the mini album First Invasion and in Japan in November 2011 with a Japanese version of the song "BTD (Before the Dawn)" released as single.

== Albums ==
=== Studio albums ===
Title	Album details	Peak chart positions		Sales
Title	Album details	KOR	JPN	Sales
Over the Top	Released: July 21, 2011 (KOR); Label: Woollim Entertainment, CJ E&M; Formats: CD, digital download	2	—	KOR: 57,763
Koi ni Ochiru Toki	Released: June 5, 2013 (JPN); Label: Universal D, Woollim Contests; Formats: CD, digital download	—	1	JPN: 76,530+
Season 2	Released: May 21, 2014 (KOR); Label: Woollim Entertainment, LOEN Entertainment; Formats: CD, digital download	1	18	KOR: 158,516; JPN: 19,598+
For You	Released: December 16, 2015 (JPN); Label: Delicious Deli Records, Woollim Contests; Formats: CD, digital download; Track listing: 1. Can’t Get Over You; 2. Love of My Life; 3. Bad (Japanese Ver.); 4. Dilemma; 5. Just Another Lonely Night; 6. Between Me & You (Japanese Ver.); 7. Last Romeo ~Kimi ga Ireba Ii~ (～君がいればいい～); 8. For You; 9. Nothing’s Over (Japanese Ver.); 10. 24 Hours (24時間); 11. Back (Japanese Ver.)	—	3	JPN: 26,851
Air	Released: May 24, 2017 (JPN); Label: Delicious Deli Records, Woollim Contests; Formats: CD, digital download; Track listing: 1. Air (Japanese Ver.); 2. One Day (Japanese Ver.); 3. Zero (Japanese Ver.); 4. Toki; 5. Thank You (Japanese Ver.); 6. The Eye (Japanese Ver.); 7. After Dark; 8. Waiting for the Moment; 9. Man In Love (Ava1anche Remix); 10. Be Mine (Ava1anche Remix); 11. True Love (Japanese Ver.)	—	6	JPN: 22,528
Top Seed	Released: January 8, 2018 (KOR); Label: Woollim Entertainment, LOEN Entertainment; Formats: CD, digital download	1	17	KOR: 81,703; JPN: 3,346
"—" denotes releases that did not chart or were not released in that region.

=== Compilation albums ===
Title	Album details	Peak chart positions	Sales
Title	Album details	JPN	Sales
The Origin	Released: April 10, 2014 (KOR); Label: Woollim Entertainment; Formats: CD, digital download	—	KOR: 29,950
Best of Infinite	Released: August 31, 2016 (JPN); Label: Delicious Deli Records, Woollim Contests; Formats: CD, digital download	3	JPN: 14,335+
"—" denotes releases that did not chart or were not released in that region.

=== Live albums ===
Title	Album details	Peak chart positions	Sales
Title	Album details	KOR	Sales
One Great Step Returns Live	Released: April 9, 2015; Label: Woollim Entertainment; Formats: CD, digital download	3	KOR: 13,248
Infinite Effect Advance Live	Releases: November 10, 2016; Label: Woollim Entertainment; Formats: CD, digital download	—	

=== Reissues ===
Title	Album details	Peak chart positions	Sales
Title	Album details	KOR	Sales
Paradise	Released: September 26, 2011; Label: Woollim Entertainment, CJ E&M; Formats: CD, digital download	1	KOR: 135,829
Be Back	Released: July 22, 2014; Label: Woollim Entertainment, LOEN Entertainment; Formats: CD, digital download	1	KOR: 99,522

=== Single albums ===
Title	Album details	Peak chart positions	Sales
Title	Album details	KOR	Sales
Inspirit	Released: March 17, 2011; Label: Woollim Entertainment, CJ E&M; Formats: CD, digital download	3	KOR: 69,588
Destiny	Released: July 16, 2013; Label: Woollim Entertainment, CJ E&M; Formats: CD, digital download	1	KOR: 166,613

== Extended plays ==
Title	EP details	Peak chart positions		Sales
Title	EP details	KOR	JPN	Sales
First Invasion	Released: June 9, 2010; Label: Woollim Entertainment, CJ E&M; Formats: CD, digital download	10	—	KOR: 52,496
Evolution	Released: January 6, 2011; Label: Woollim Entertainment, CJ E&M; Formats: CD, digital download	3	—	KOR: 70,426
Infinitize	Released: May 15, 2012; Label: Woollim Entertainment, LOEN Entertainment; Formats: CD, digital download	2	—	KOR: 163,339; JPN: 13,345+
New Challenge	Released: March 21, 2013; Label: Woollim Entertainment, LOEN Entertainment; Formats: CD, digital download	1	16	KOR: 168,067; JPN: 16,452+
Reality	Released: July 13, 2015; Label: Woollim Entertainment, LOEN Entertainment; Formats: CD, digital download	1	13	KOR: 153,280; JPN: 7,088+
Infinite Only	Released: September 19, 2016; Label: Woollim Entertainment, LOEN Entertainment; Formats: CD, digital download	1	14	KOR: 130,299; JPN: 5,932
13egin	Released: July 31, 2023; Label: Infinite Company; Formats: CD, digital download	8	41	KOR: 98,452; JPN: 690
Like Infinite	Released: March 6, 2025; Label: Infinite Company; Formats: CD, digital download	3	46	KOR: 184,999; JPN: 980
"—" denotes releases that did not chart or were not released in that region.

== Singles ==
Title	Year	Peak chart positions						Sales	Album
Title	Year	KOR Circle	KOR Hot	JPN Oricon	JPN Hot	JPN RIAJ	US World	Sales	Album
Korean
"Come Back Again" (다시 돌아와)	2010	67	—	—	—	—	—	—N/a	First Invasion
"She's Back"	2010	66	—	—	—	—	—	—N/a	First Invasion
"Voice of My Heart" (마음으로..)	2010	95	—	—	—	—	—	—N/a	Evolution
"BTD (Before the Dawn)"	2011	45	—	—	—	—	—	KOR: 50,425	Evolution
"Nothing's Over"	2011	22	—	—	—	—	—	KOR: 711,973	Inspirit
"Can U Smile" (Broadcasting ver.)	2011	38	—	—	—	—	—	KOR: 202,338	Non-album single
"Be Mine" (내꺼하자)	2011	12	10	—	—	—	—	KOR: 2,116,727	Over The Top
"Paradise" (파라다이스)	2011	3	6	—	—	—	—	KOR: 1,637,674	Paradise
"White Confession (Lately)" (하얀 고백)	2011	6	9	—	—	—	—	KOR: 911,961	"Lately" (single)
"Cover Girl" (Live ver.)	2012	63	52	—	—	—	—	KOR: 237,941	"Second Invasion" (single)
"Only Tears" (눈물만)	2012	14	28	—	—	—	—	KOR: 323,242	Infinitize
"The Chaser" (추격자)	2012	7	8	—	—	—	—	KOR: 1,552,934	Infinitize
"Man in Love" (남자가 사랑할때)	2013	6	6	—	—	—	8	KOR: 742,440	New Challenge
"Destiny"	2013	3	3	—	—	—	—	KOR: 529,745	Destiny
"Last Romeo"	2014	7	8	—	—	—	8	KOR: 374,159	Season 2
"Back"	2014	2	—N/a	—	—	—	4	KOR: 401,171	Be Back
"Bad"	2015	6	—N/a	—	—	—	—	KOR: 374,040	Reality
"That Summer (The Second Story)" (그 해 여름 (두 번째 이야기))	2016	67	—N/a	—	—	—	—	KOR: 49,005	"That Summer 3" (single)
"The Eye" (태풍)	2016	8	—N/a	—	—	—	3	KOR: 324,967	Infinite Only
"Tell Me"	2018	15	10	—	—	—	19	—N/a	Top Seed
"Clock"	2019	114	—	—	—	—	—	—N/a	Non-album single
"New Emotions"	2023	102	—	—	—	—	—	—N/a	13egin
"Flower"	2024	— (Note: "Flower" did not enter the Circle Digital Chart, but peaked at number 16 on the component Download Chart.)	—	—	—	—	—	—N/a	Non-album single
"Sad Loop" (볼 수 있어)	2024	— (Note: "Sad Loop" did not enter the Circle Digital Chart, but peaked at number 45 on the component Download Chart.)	—	—	—	—	—	—N/a	Like Infinite
"Dangerous"	2025	113	—	—	—	—	—	—N/a	Like Infinite
"I Still Remember" (우리의 계절)	2026	— (Note: "I Still Remember" did not enter the Circle Digital Chart, but peaked at number 41 on the component Download Chart.)	—	—	—	—	—	—N/a	Non-album single
Japanese
"BTD (Before the Dawn)"	2011	—	—	7	20	6		JPN: 26,333	Koi ni Ochiru Toki
"Be Mine"	2012	—	—	2	3	—		JPN: 57,073	Koi ni Ochiru Toki
"She's Back"	2012	—	—	3	4	—		JPN: 44,137	Koi ni Ochiru Toki
"Last Romeo ~Kimi ga ireba ī~"	2014	—	—	2	3	—		JPN: 49,003	For You
"Dilemma"	2014	—	—	3	7	—		JPN: 51,522	For You
"24 Jikan"	2015	—	—	3	4	—		JPN: 56,266	For You
"Can't Get Over You"	2015	—	—	—	—	—		JPN: 22,877	For You
"D.N.A"	2016	—	—	—	—	—		JPN: 11,325	Best of Infinite
"Air" (Japanese ver.)	2017	—	—	—	—	—		JPN: 21,856	Air
"Clock" (Japanese ver.)	2019	—	—	—	—	—	—	—N/a	Non-album single
"—" denotes releases that did not chart or were not released in that region. The Billboard Korea K-Pop Hot 100 has been discontinued since its issue date of July 16, 2014.

== Promotional singles ==
Title	Year	Peak chart positions		Sales	Album
Title	Year	KOR	KOR Hot	Sales	Album
"Request"	2013	40	50	KOR: 96,177	"Galaxy Music" (single)

== Other charted songs ==
Title	Year	Peak chart positions		Sales	Album
Title	Year	KOR	KOR Hot	Sales	Album
"3분의1" (⅓)	2011	133	—	KOR: 76,751	Over the Top
"Tic Toc"	2011	142	—	KOR: 63,340	Over the Top
"Julia"	2011	161	—	KOR: 43,890	Over the Top
"Because" (Sungkyu Solo)	2011	199	—	KOR: 34,246	Over the Top
"시간아" ("Time" - WooHyun Solo)	2011	176	—	KOR: 41,910	Over the Top
"Amazing"	2011	175	—	KOR: 46,104	Over the Top
"Crying" (Infinite H Feat. Baby Soul)	2011	180	—	KOR: 34,841	Over the Top
"Real Story"	2011	198	—	KOR: 32,772	Over the Top
"Cover Girl"	2011	80	—	KOR: 92,136	Paradise
"Infinitize"	2012	111	—	KOR: 33,317	Infinitize
"Feel So Bad"	2012	48	89	KOR: 92,635	Infinitize
"That Year's Summer"	2012	56	68	KOR: 183,779	Infinitize
"I Like You"	2012	62	98	KOR: 78,389	Infinitize
"With..."	2012	80	—	KOR: 52,771	Infinitize
"Welcome to Our Dream"	2013	68	95	KOR: 42,821	New Challenge
"As Good As It Gets"	2013	33	33	KOR: 97,372	New Challenge
"Still I Miss You"	2013	31	22	KOR: 139,884	New Challenge
"Beautiful"	2013	38	44	KOR: 73,875	New Challenge
"60 Seconds" (Infinite version)	2013	44	64	KOR: 69,653	New Challenge
"An Inconvenient Truth"	2013	39	52	KOR: 85,500	New Challenge
"Inception"	2013	34	53	KOR: 94,471	Destiny
"Going to You"	2013	37	63	KOR: 78,827	Destiny
"Mom"	2013	46	79	KOR: 62,448	Destiny
"Season 2"	2014	—	—	KOR: 35,920	Season 2
"Follow Me"	2014	55	63	KOR: 66,686	Season 2
"Rosinante"	2014	58	84	KOR: 68,308	Season 2
"Breath"	2014	61	92	KOR: 32,376	Season 2
"Light" (Sungkyu Solo)	2014	57	77	KOR: 57,458	Season 2
"Alone" (Infinite H)	2014	56	59	KOR: 58,438	Season 2
"Memories"	2014	54	67	KOR: 67,766	Season 2
"A Person Like Me"	2014	74	—	KOR: 49,151	Season 2
"Reflex"	2014	71	100	KOR: 48,276	Season 2
"Crazy" (Infinite F)	2014	75	—	KOR: 45,356	Season 2
"Close Your Eyes" (Woohyun Solo)	2014	73	99	KOR: 47,782	Season 2
"Shower"	2014	67	98	KOR: 63,609	Season 2
"Diamond"	2014	20	N/A	KOR: 87,441	Be Back
"Betting"	2015	57	N/A	KOR: 43,904	Reality
"Moonlight"	2015	24	N/A	KOR: 100,946	Reality
"Walk to Remember"	2015	38	N/A	KOR: 66,725	Reality
"Between Me and You"	2015	33	N/A	KOR: 90,385	Reality
"Love Letter"	2015	36	N/A	KOR: 80,614	Reality
"Up to You"	2015	46	N/A	KOR: 62,822	Reality
"Eternity"	2016	77	N/A	KOR: 27,661	Infinite Only
"AIR"	2016	52	N/A	KOR: 39,897	Infinite Only
"One Day"	2016	49	N/A	KOR: 41,961	Infinite Only
"True Love"	2016	57	N/A	KOR: 37,441	Infinite Only
"Thank You"	2016	56	N/A	KOR: 37,989	Infinite Only
"Zero"	2016	61	N/A	KOR: 35,304	Infinite Only
"Begin"	2018	— (Note: "Begin" did not enter the Gaon Digital Chart, but peaked at number 79 on the Download component chart.)	—	N/A	Top Seed
"Synchronise"	2018	— (Note: "Synchronise" did not enter the Gaon Digital Chart, but peaked at number 40 on the Download component chart.)	—	N/A	Top Seed
"No More"	2018	— (Note: "No More" did not enter the Gaon Digital Chart, but peaked at number 42 on the Download component chart.)	—	N/A	Top Seed
"TGIF (Dongwoo Solo)"	2018	— (Note: "TGIF (Dongwoo Solo)" did not enter the Gaon Digital Chart, but peaked at number 59 on the Download component chart.)	—	N/A	Top Seed
"Pray (Mattel's Sorrow)"	2018	— (Note: "Pray (Mattel's Sorrow)" did not enter the Gaon Digital Chart, but peaked at number 42 on the Download component chart.)	—	N/A	Top Seed
"Why Me"	2018	— (Note: "Why Me" did not enter the Gaon Digital Chart, but peaked at number 36 on the Download component chart.)	—	N/A	Top Seed
"Wind"	2018	— (Note: "Wind" did not enter the Gaon Digital Chart, but peaked at number 47 on the Download component chart.)	—	N/A	Top Seed
"I Hate"	2018	— (Note: "I Hate" did not enter the Gaon Digital Chart, but peaked at number 56 on the Download component chart.)	—	N/A	Top Seed
"Reminisce (L Solo)"	2018	— (Note: "Reminisce (L Solo)" did not enter the Gaon Digital Chart, but peaked at number 65 on the download chart.)	—	N/A	Top Seed
"Love Song (Sungjong Solo)"	2018	— (Note: "Love Song (Sungjong Solo)" did not enter the Gaon Digital Chart, but peaked at number 68 on the download chart.)	—	N/A	Top Seed
"Begin Again"	2018	— (Note: "Begin Again" did not enter the Gaon Digital Chart, but peaked at number 54 on the download chart.)	—	N/A	Top Seed

== Soundtrack appearances ==
Title	Year	Peak chart positions		Sales	Album
Title	Year	KOR	KOR Hot	Sales	Album
"Always Open"	2011	—	—	—N/a	Welcome to Convenience Store OST
"She's a Fantasy"	2012	35	48	—N/a	What is Mom OST
"Monster Time"	2014	—	—	—N/a	Telemonster OST
"Together (함께)"	2014	27	—	—N/a	Grow: Infinite's Real Youth Life OST
"Beside Me (Lee Sung Jong Solo.)"	2018	—	—	—N/a	Mysterious Nurse OST

== Video albums ==
Title	Album details	Peak chart positions	
Title	Album details	JPN	
Title	Album details	DVD	Blu-Ray
You're My Oppa - Infinite	Released: August 3, 2011; Label: Culture & Publishers Contest; Format: DVD	87	—
Infinite Japan 1st Live Leaping Over	Released: February 29, 2012; Label: Culture & Publishers Contest, Universal Music Japan; Format: DVD	13	—
Infinite Showcase The Mission	Released: June 25, 2012; Label: Woollim Entertainment; Format: DVD	17	—
Second Invasion - 1st Live Concert in Seoul	Released: August 1, 2012; Label: Woollim Entertainment, Universal Music Japan; Format: DVD	8	—
Second Invasion - in Japan	Released: August 1, 2012; Label: Universal Music Japan; Format: DVD	7	—
Infinite Ranking King	Released: April 24, 2013; Label: Culture Publishers; Format: DVD	21	—
2012 Infinite Concert "That Summer"	Released: April 30, 2013; Label: dnt Media, Universal Music Japan; Format: DVD	5	—
Infinite Destiny in America	Released: October 22, 2013; Label: Woollim Entertainment, Universal Music Japan, Warner Music Taiwan; Format: DVD	7	—
Infinite 1st Arena Tour in Japan	Released: October 30, 2013; Label: Universal Music Japan; Format: DVD	6	—
Infinite 2014 Season Greetings	Released: December 13, 2013; Label: Woollim Entertainment, SM Culture and Contents, CJ E&M; Format: DVD	—	—
Dis is Infinite	Released: March 23, 2015; Label: Woollim Entertainment; Format: DVD	21	—
One Great Step Returns	Released: March 23, 2015; Label: CJ E&M; Format: DVD	—	—
2014 Infinite Concert "That Summer 2"	Released: May 13, 2015; Label: Woollim Entertainment; Formats: DVD, Blu-ray	15	14
Grow: Infinite's Real Youth Life	Released: August 19, 2015; Label: Victor Entertainment; Formats: DVD, Blu-ray	21	15
2015 Infinite Japan Tour - Dilemma	Released: September 9, 2015; Label: Universal Music Japan; Formats: DVD, Blu-ray	2	12
Infinite Effect Advance Live DVD and CD	Released: November 10, 2016; Label: Woolim Entertainment; Format: CD+DVD	—	—
Infinite Fanmeeting III	Released: August 9, 2017; Label: Woolim Entertainment; Format: CD+DVD	—	

== Videography ==
=== Music videos ===
List of music videos, showing year released
Title	Year	Other version(s)
"Come Back Again"	2010	Dance Ver.
"She's Back"	2010	
"BTD (Before The Dawn)"	2011	Dance Ver.
"Nothing's Over"	2011	
"Be Mine"	2011	Dance Ver.
"Paradise"	2011	
"White Confession (Lately)"	2011	
"Cover Girl" (Live Ver.)	2012	
"Be Mine" (Japanese Ver.)	2012	
"The Chaser"'	2012	Dance Ver.
"She's Back"' (Japanese Ver.)	2012	
"Man In Love"	2013	
"Man In Love" (Japanese Ver.)	2013	
"Destiny" (Ver. B)	2013	(Ver. A); Dance Ver.
"Request"	2013	
"Last Romeo"	2014	Original Ver.
"Last Romeo" (Japanese Ver.)	2014	
"Back"	2014	Performance Ver.
"Grow"	2014	
"Dilemma" (Japanese Ver.)	2014	
"24 Hours" (Japanese Ver.)	2015	
"Tic Toc" (OGS Returns Live Ver.)	2015	
"Bad"	2015	360 VR
"Can't Get Over you" (Japanese Ver.)	2015	
"That Summer (Second Story)"	2016	
"D.N.A" (Japanese Ver.)	2016	Dance Ver.
"태풍 (The Eye)"	2016	Choreography Ver
"Up To You (Infinite Effect Advance Live Ver.)"	2016	
"Air (Japanese Ver.)"	2017	
"Tell Me"	2018	
"Clock"	2019	
"Clock" (Japanese Ver.)	2019	
