= One Great Step =

2013 concert tour by Infinite

- World tour by Infinite
- Promotional poster
- Location: Asia; North America; Europe
- Start date: August 9, 2013
- End date: December 14, 2013
- Legs: 4
- No. of shows: 31

Infinite concert chronology
- Second Invasion Evolution Plus (2012); One Great Step (2013); 2015 Infinite Japan Tour — Dilemma (2015)

One Great Step was the first worldwide concert tour by South Korean boy group Infinite. The tour visited arenas and stadiums in Asia, North America, and Europe. The set list consisted of songs from all of the group's previous albums. Derived from American astronaut Neil Armstrong's "one small step" quote, One Great Step was announced during a press conference a day after Infinite celebrated their three-year anniversary. The tour's concept revolves around Infinite's fight against an oppressive government and resolves with the two sides declaring peace.

One Great Step ran from August to December 2013, which saw stops in 21 cities across fourteen countries. Infinite's stage performances were met with positive reviews and, by the end of its run, the concert tour drew an accumulated 150,000 attendees. A pair of encore concerts entitled One Great Step Returns took place the following February and March in Seoul. The final performance was recorded for a live album entitled One Great Step Returns Live, which was released in 2015 and peaked at number three on South Korea's national Gaon Album Chart.

== Background ==
Infinite celebrated their three-year anniversary on June 9, 2013. The following day, the group held a press conference at the Cheongdam-dong branch of CGV MCube cinema in Seoul to announce their first world tour. The event was broadcast globally on Google Online. The concert tour's name is based on American astronaut Neil Armstrong's first words upon stepping on the moon, which was modified from "one small step" to signify Infinite's ambitions. The tour's first promotional poster was unveiled at the ceremony, which showed Infinite walking on the words "One Great Step". The theme drew comparisons to the cover of Japanese boy group Arashi's fifteenth single "Wish", which displayed them walking over their name. Writing for entertainment website Sports World, Kim Yong-ho felt that the two were identical despite a difference in coloring and the walking direction. The press conference was subject to criticism for its poor operation. Kim cited the event's technical difficulties, which included being unable to hear fans through video calls, and the host leaving without taking any questions as a reflection of Woollim Entertainment and Infinite's shortcomings for the forthcoming tour.

Infinite's preparations for One Great Step took place at a concert hall in Paju, Gyeonggi Province and lasted approximately two months. Conceptually, the tour is based on Infinite's uprising "against a fictional government that prohibits music". The Infinite members rebelled against the "music police" which attempted to silence them. The storyline ends with the two groups declaring peace, allowing Infinite to perform music.

== Concert synopsis ==
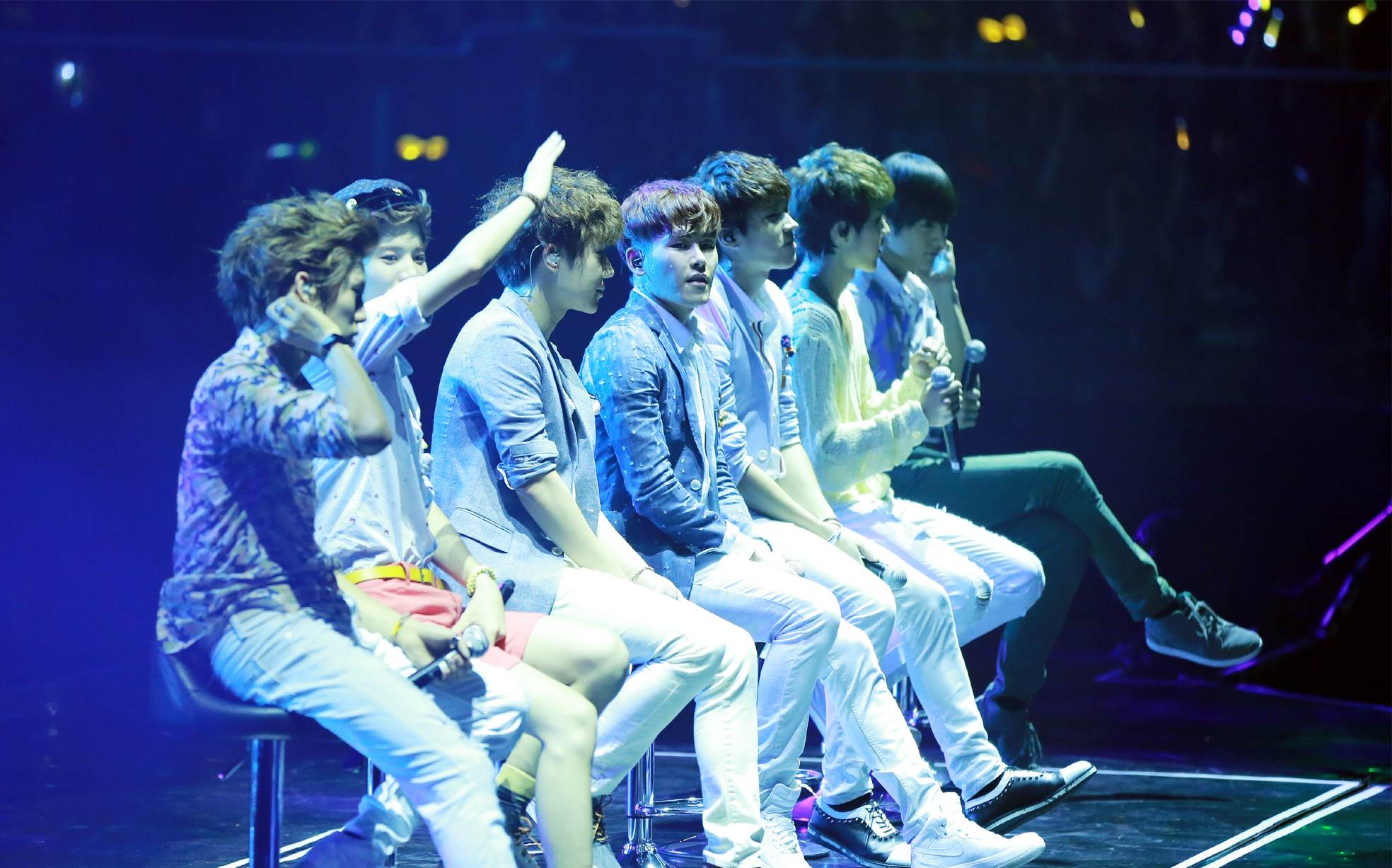
Infinite performing in Hong Kong

The concert opened with a video played on screen, where the Infinite members were depicted as fugitives. Once the video ended, an ensemble of dancers appeared on stage and executed a choreography routine utilizing laser rods. Following the act, the screen opened as red lights flashed on stage. It revealed Infinite imprisoned behind a steel cage, wearing black suits with gold trimmings. Bound by handcuffs, they broke free from the restraints and danced to "orchestra-like" music. The show commenced with Infinite singing "Destiny" on stage illuminated by lasers lights, proceeded by "Tic Toc". Infinite then removed their jackets and showcased a "sexy" silhouette dance sequence. They performed "Paradise" in black tank tops. The group continued with "Wings" and "Inception", the latter of which utilized a dance routine involving chairs. The setlist transitioned to medium-tempo sweet songs as they performed "Can U Smile", "Come to You", and "Nothing's Over" in sophisticated suits, standing behind microphone stands.

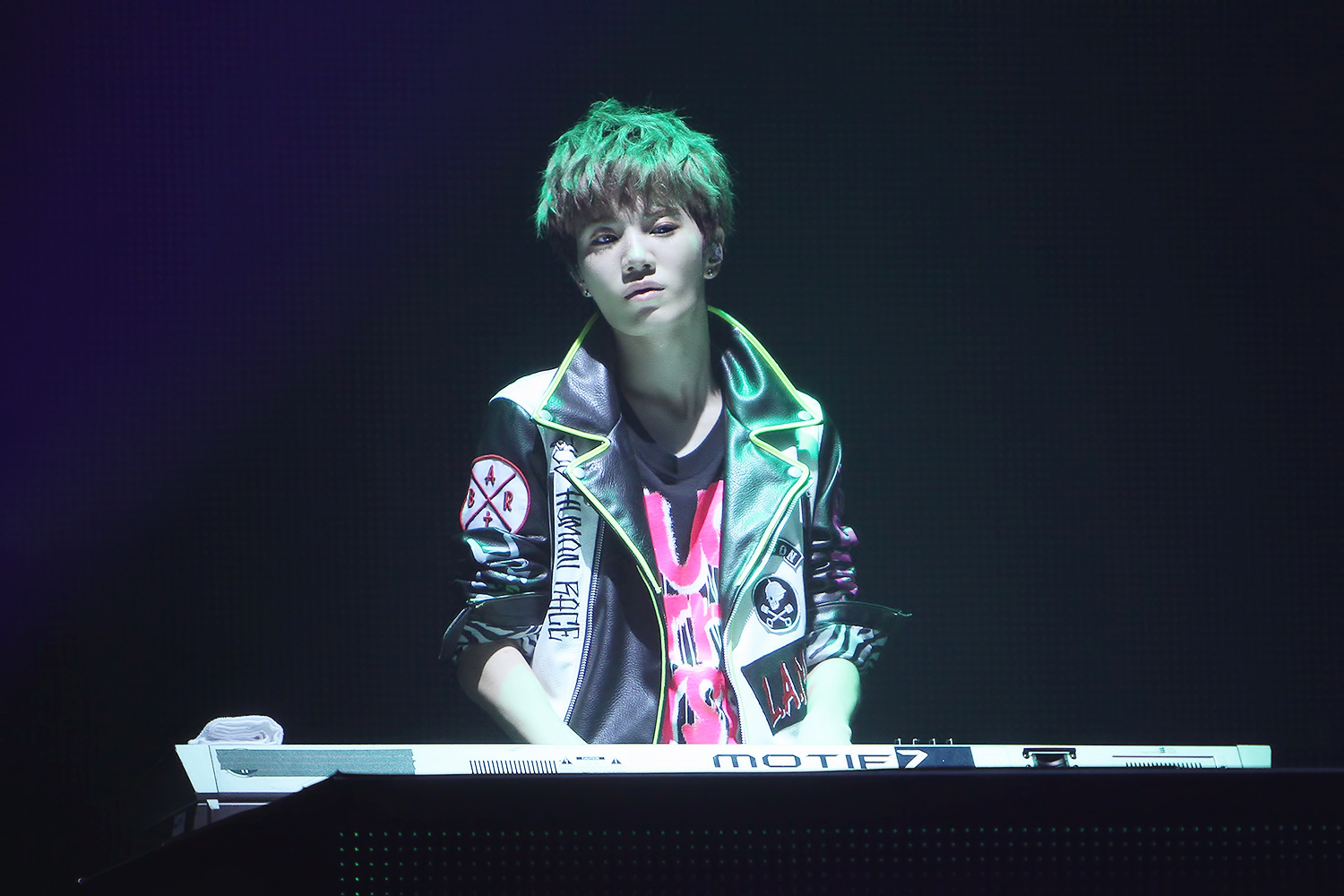
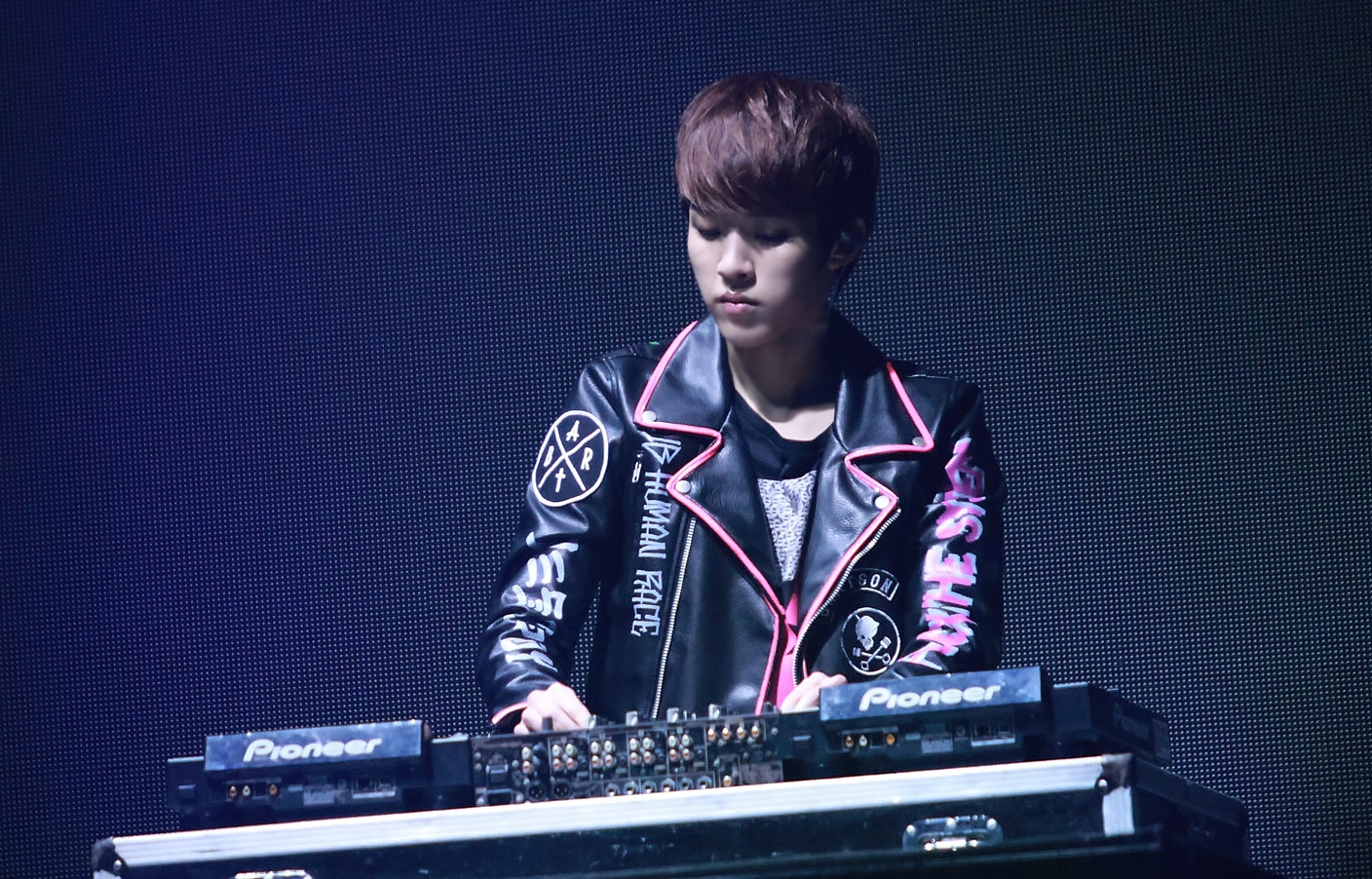
Sungjong (left) on keyboards and Sungyeol (right) deejaying

The production shifted into performances with an emphasis of the members as soloists and units henceforth. Sungjong and Sungyeol sported "neon-color-trimmed" leather jackets as they respectively played a keyboard and deejayed over the track in their electronic music rendition of "1/3". Infinite H, comprising Hoya and Dongwoo, performed the hip-hop numbers "Fly High", "Victorious Way", and "Special Girl". The music video for the album track "Inconvenient Truth" from Infinite's mini-album New Challenge (2013) was unveiled thereafter. Infinite returned to the stage donning pastel-colored clothing to perform "That Year's Summer" with a sky-blue minibus on set for a "refreshing and bubbly" atmosphere and a vacation feel. Amidst their performance of "I Like You", the group threw autographed paper airplanes in the air. They also descended from the platform to take pictures with members of the audience on the first and second floors of the venue.

For his solo performance, L created a romantic atmosphere by wearing a "dandy" white suit and sitting on a bench next to a teddy bear. He played an acoustic guitar while singing the track "Love U Like You". Woohyun performed his solo pop number "Beautiful". At the first live concert, it was structured to emulate a musical with a "cute" dance. He also handed out flowers and rings to the audience during the performance. Sungkyu sang the piano-driven rock song "60 Seconds". He was accompanied by a 14-string orchestra at the inaugural show.

Infinite pivoted to emotional songs starting with "Still I Miss You". As they sang the somber "Mother", childhood photographs taken with their mothers were displayed onscreen. The group returned to upbeat tracks and performed "She's Back", "Entrust", and "Cover Girl" while navigating through the audience on the first through third floors. The singles "Be Mine" and "BTD (Before the Dawn)" were both performed with a live band. A metal guitar riff version of "Come Back Again" played for Infinite's encore performance. They closed the show with "Hysterie" and "With...".

== Encore concerts and live album ==
Infinite appeared as guests on SBS Power FM's radio program Youngstreet on December 20, 2013, and announced a pair of encore concerts. Sungjong described the two shows' concept as being able to play with fans. Entitled One Great Step Returns, the shows took place at the Olympic Gymnastics Arena in Seoul. Three previously unreleased songs were performed: Infinite H unveiled the mid-tempo hip-hip number "Alone"; Woohyun played the piano as he sang the ballad "Close My Eyes"; and the newly formed Infinite F—comprising L, Sungjong, and Sungyeol—debuted their track "Heartthrob".

Material from Infinite's final encore show was recorded for their first live album entitled One Great Step Returns Live. One week ahead of its distribution, Woollim Entertainment uploaded a 30-second video teaser for the record. Mastered by Christian Wright at the Abbey Road Studios, the 2-disc set was released on April 9, 2015. A live version music video for the album track "Tic Toc" from Over the Top (2011) was simultaneously published. The album debuted and peaked at number three on the Gaon Album Chart, shifting 14,241 units by the end of the month.

== Critical and commercial reception ==
Park Se-yon of entertainment website Star Today wrote that the "historic" performances were exceptional, noting that there were no lulls throughout the show. In her review for Dispatch, Kim Su-ji called Infinite's world tour their "destiny", but lamented the simplicity in the stage design, lighting, and sets. Columnist Jeff Benjamin of Billboard magazine commended the group's employment of their surroundings, noting that "the boys utilized every part" of the Hammerstein Ballroom in New York despite lacking the "same technology and stage platform" from stages in South Korea. He continued, saying that the group "further proved that K-pop acts do not need to fill out an arena to give a meaningful and visually-impressive concert." Analyn Perez of GMA News Online wrote that Infinite "pushed the level higher" for the stage design and production at their concert in Manila. Charmaine Cunanan lauded Infinite in her review for the Manila Standard, describing the show as "a perfect mix of amazing performances and a venue to get closer to the fans", saying that it was "impossible not to notice that the show was excellently produced".

Ticket sales for the first pair of concerts in Seoul went on sale on June 18 on the online auction website Interpark. The high demand for reservations led the company's servers to crash and admissions sold out. Infinite received 6.264 tonnes of fan rice during the first pair of shows in Seoul, which the group donated to Holt International Children's Services. The group donated an additional 18.26 tonnes of rice to the organization that they received from their pair of encore concerts. Infinite completed 31 shows across fourteen countries and 21 cities, drawing an audience of approximately 150,000.

== Setlist ==
One Great Step

This set list is representative of the show on August 9, 2013. It does not represent all concerts for the duration of the tour.

1. "Destiny"
2. "Tic Toc"
3. "Paradise"
4. "Wings" (날개)
5. "Inception"
6. "Can U Smile"
7. "Come to You" (너에게 간다)
8. "Nothing's Over"
9. "1/3" (3분의1) (Sungjong and Sungyeol unit)
10. "Special Girl" (Infinite H)
11. "That Year's Summer" (그해여름)
12. "I Like You" (니가 좋다)
13. "Love U Like You" (L)
14. "Beautiful" (Woohyun)
15. "60 Seconds" (60초) (Sunggyu)
16. "Still I Miss You" (그리움이 닿는 곳에)
17. "Mother" (엄마)
18. "She's Back"
19. "Entrust" (맡겨)
20. "Cover Girl"
21. "Be Mine" (내꺼하자)
22. "BTD (Before the Dawn)"
23. "Man in Love" (남자가 사랑할 때)
24. "The Chaser" (추격자)

Encore

1. "Come Back Again" (다시 돌아와)
2. "Hysterie"
3. "With..."

Notes

- "Request" was added to the set list on September 28, 2013.
One Great Step Returns
1. "Destiny"
2. "Tic Toc"
3. "Paradise"
4. "Wings" (날개)
5. "Inception"
6. "Can U Smile"
7. "Come to You" (너에게 간다)
8. "Alone" (Infinite H)
9. "Close My Eyes" (Woohyun)
10. "41 Days" (41일) (Sungkyu)
11. "Heartthrob" (Infinite F)
12. "Still I Miss You" (그리움이 닿는 곳에)
13. "Inconvenient Truth" (불편한 진실)
14. "I Like You" (니가 좋다)
15. "White Confession (Lately)" (하얀 고백)
16. "As Good as It Gets" (이보다 좋을순 없다)
17. "Nothing's Over"
18. "Entrust" (맡겨)
19. "Cover Girl"
20. "Be Mine" (내꺼하자)
21. "BTD (Before the Dawn)"
22. "Man in Love" (남자가 사랑할 때)
23. "The Chaser" (추격자)

Encore

1. "Come Back Again" (다시 돌아와)
2. "Julia"
3. "With..."

== Shows ==
List of concerts, showing date, city, country, venue, opening act, tickets sold, number of available tickets and amount of gross revenue
Date	City	Country	Venue	Attendance	Revenue
Asia
August 9, 2013	Seoul	South Korea	Olympic Gymnastics Arena	15,000 / 15,000	
August 10, 2013	Seoul	South Korea	Olympic Gymnastics Arena	15,000 / 15,000	
August 18, 2013	Hong Kong		AsiaWorld–Arena		
August 31, 2013	Jakarta	Indonesia	Mata Elang International Stadium		
September 5, 2013	Fukuoka	Japan	Fukuoka Convention Center		
September 10, 2013	Hiroshima	Japan	Nakano Sun Plaza		
September 13, 2013	Kobe	Japan	Kobe World Hall		
September 14, 2013	Kobe	Japan	Kobe World Hall		
September 18, 2013	Yokohama	Japan	Yokohama Arena		
September 19, 2013	Yokohama	Japan	Yokohama Arena		
September 20, 2013	Yokohama	Japan	Yokohama Arena		
September 28, 2013	Bangkok	Thailand	Thunderdome Stadium	4,500 / 4,500	
October 5, 2013	Singapore		Singapore Indoor Stadium	4,000	
October 12, 2013	Taipei	Taiwan	Xinzhuang Gymnasium		
October 13, 2013	Taipei	Taiwan	Xinzhuang Gymnasium		
October 19, 2013	Kuala Lumpur	Malaysia	Stadium Negara		
October 25, 2013	Guangzhou	China	Guangzhou International Sports Arena		
October 30, 2013	Shanghai	China	Shanghai Indoor Stadium		
November 3, 2013	Quezon City	Philippines	Smart Araneta Coliseum		
North America
November 8, 2013	Los Angeles	United States	Nokia Theatre L.A. Live	4,086 / 6,882	$406,850
November 11, 2013	San Jose	United States	Event Center, San Jose State University	2,342 / 3,004	$278,680
November 13, 2013	Silver Spring	United States	Fillmore Theatre		
November 16, 2013	New York City	United States	Hammerstein Ballroom		
Europe
November 27, 2013	London	England	Hammersmith Apollo		
December 1, 2013	Paris	France	Olympia		
Middle East
December 6, 2013	Dubai	United Arab Emirates	Sheikh Rashid Hall		
Total				150,000	

=== Encore shows ===
List of concerts, showing date, city, country, venue, opening act, tickets sold, number of available tickets and amount of gross revenue
Date	City	Country	Venue	Attendance	Revenue
February 28, 2014	Seoul	South Korea	Olympic Gymnastics Arena	20,000 / 20,000	
March 1, 2014	Seoul	South Korea	Olympic Gymnastics Arena	20,000 / 20,000	
