= Koi ni Ochiru Toki =

- Regular edition cover

Studio album by Infinite
- Released: June 5, 2013
- Recorded: 2010–2013
- Genre: J-pop; Dance; Ballad
- Length: 40:04
- Language: Japanese
- Label: Woollim Contents; Universal D

Infinite chronology
Koi ni Ochiru Toki (2013)	For You (2015)

Singles from Koi ni Ochiru Toki
- 1. "BTD (Before the Dawn)" Released: November 19, 2011; 2. "Be Mine" Released: April 18, 2012; 3. "She's Back" Released: August 29, 2012

Koi ni Ochiru Toki (恋に落ちるとき; "When You Fall in Love") is the first Japanese studio album by the South Korean boy band Infinite. It was released on June 5, 2013, in two different editions. The album is the first audio-related release of the group under Universal Music Japan's sublabel Universal D.

== Background ==
The album's release was announced by the group's Korean label, Woollim Entertainment, on March 29, 2013, with the release day, prices and details about the editions. On April 10, a promotional photograph of the album was released. On April 24, the cover of the regular edition, track list and the album's title were revealed.

=== Editions ===
- Regular edition (POCS-1087): The regular edition includes the CD only, a 36-page booklet, a random card and a lottery ticket to an event.
- Limited edition (POCS-9030): The limited edition has, along with the standard track list of the album, a DVD with all of the Japanese music videos released to date, a 52-page photobook, a 20-page photobook of a member (randomly chosen) and a lottery ticket to an event.

== Composition ==
The album has twelve tracks, all Japanese versions of songs previously recorded in Korean. The songs "Welcome to Our Dream" and "Man in Love" were released on the fourth Korean mini-album New Challenge. "To-Ra-Wa", a Japanese version of the song "Dasi Dorawa", "She's Back" and "Wings" were released on the group's first Korean mini-album, First Invasion. "BTD (Before the Dawn)" was released on the second Korean mini-album, Evolution. "Be Mine", "Tic Toc", "Timeless", "Crying", "Because" and "Julia" were released on their first Korean studio album Over the Top. The Japanese version of "Crying", a song of the group's sub-unit Infinite H, features the Japanese television personality and singer Becky♪♯.

== Singles ==
Three songs from the album were released as singles:

The first single, a Japanese version of the song "BTD (Before the Dawn)", was released on November 19, 2011. It peaked at number seven in Oricon's weekly chart, selling 26,333 copies in its first week.

The second single, a Japanese version of "Be Mine", was released on April 18, 2012. It peaked at number two in Oricon's weekly chart, selling 50,473 copies in its first week. The B-side, "Julia", was included on the album.

The third and final single, a Japanese version of "She's Back", was released on August 29, 2012. It peaked at number three in Oricon's weekly chart, selling 38,998 copies in its first week. The B-side, "To-Ra-Wa", was also included on the album.

== Chart performance ==
The album entered Oricon Chartat #1 following its release, selling 40,767 copies on the first day. In its first week on the chart, the album sold 69,647 copies, making it number 1 on the Oricon Weekly Album Chart. In its second week on the chart, the album dropped to number 18, selling another 4,178 copies.

== Track listing ==
All editions track list
No.	Title	Lyrics	Music	Length
1.	"Welcome to Our Dream"		Ahn Junsung	1:09
2.	"Man in Love"	Song Sooyoon	Han Jaeho, Lee Changhyun, Kim Seungsoo	3:17
3.	"To-Ra-Wa"	Kim Boomin, Shinichi Yasuoka, Tetsuro Honda (Japanese lyrics), Tsuyoshi Shimizu Hiroshi (Japanese rap lyrics)	Hitchhiker	3:08
4.	"Tic Toc"	Kim Ina	J.Yoon	3:33
5.	"Timeless" (Woohyun solo)	J.Yoon	J.Yoon	4:32
6.	"Be Mine"	Song Sooyoon, Taiki, Cue, Yumiko, Lotus Juice (Japanese lyrics)	Han Jaeho, Kim Seungsoo	3:27
7.	"Crying" (Infinite H featuring Becky♪♯)	Pe2ny, J-sus, Musikacase	Pe2ny, J-sus, Musikacase	4:08
8.	"Because" (Sunggyu solo)	JH	JH	3:53
9.	"BTD (Before the Dawn)"	Song Sooyoon, Han Jaeho, Kim Seungsoo	Han Jaeho, Kim Seungsoo	3:04
10.	"She's Back"	Song Sooyoon, Han Jaeho, Kim Seungsoo, Mithra Jin, Yumiko (Japanese lyrics)	Han Jaeho, Kim Seungsoo	3:16
11.	"Tsubasa" (翼; "Wings")	Tablo, Mithra Jin	J.Yoon	3:13
12.	"Julia"	Song Sooyoon, Yumiko (Japanese lyrics)	Han Jaeho, Kim Seungsoo	3:30
Total length:				40:04

DVD (limited edition)
No.	Title	Length
1.	"BTD (Before the Dawn)" (Music video)
2.	"Be Mine" (music video – Japanese version)
3.	"She's Back" (music video – Japanese version)
4.	"Man in Love" (music video – Japanese version)
5.	"She's Back" (music video teaser – Japanese version)
6.	"Man in Love" (music video teaser – Japanese version)

== Charts, sales and certifications ==
=== Charts ===
Chart (2013)	Peak position
Japan Oricon Daily Album Chart	1
Japan Oricon Weekly Album Chart	1
Japan Oricon Monthly Album Chart	6
Japan Oricon Yearly Album Chart	80

=== Sales and certifications ===
Country	Provider	Sales	Certification
Japan	RIAJ	75,895	N/A

== Release history ==
Country	Date	Format	Label
Japan	June 5, 2013	CD, Digital download	Woollim Contests; Universal D
