= Sweetune =

South Korean record producing team

Sweetune (Korean: 스윗튠) is a South Korean record producing team, originally consisting of Han Jae-ho and Kim Seung-soo, and now including nine other members. They have produced many hit songs and albums for Korean idols and Japanese idols, including Kara, Rainbow, Infinite, Nine Muses, Boyfriend and Spica. Sweetune is known for their 1980s-style synth-pop and disco sound.

== Team members ==
The Sweetune team includes music producers, composers, songwriters and engineers.

=== Current members ===
- Han Jae-ho (founder)
- Kim Seung-soo (founder)
- Song Soo-yoon
- Lee Chang-hyun
- Lee Hyung-suk
- Go Nam-soo
- Ahn Joon-sung
- Hong Seung-hyun

=== Former members ===
Before debuting with Spica, Kim Boa worked for Sweetune as a vocal coach, and also recorded background vocals and guide vocals. In 2014, three team members (Lee Joo-hyung, Hwang Hyun and G-High) left Sweetune and formed their own music production team, MonoTree.

== Production discography ==
=== 2008 ===
- Kara – Rock U and Pretty Girl

=== 2009 ===
- Kara – Pretty Girl Special Edition and Revolution
- Rainbow – Gossip Girl (Note: Some songs on the album are not produced by Sweetune team members)
- A'st1 - Dynamite

=== 2010 ===
- Aira Mitsuki - "LOVE Re:"
- Brown Eyed Girls – "Magic"
- Infinite – First Invasion
- Kara – Lupin and Jumping

=== 2011 ===
- Baby Soul ft. Wheesung – "Stranger"
- Boyfriend – "Don't Touch My Girl" and "I'll Be There"
- bump.y – "Kiss!" and "New Day"
- f(x) – "Love" from Pinocchio
- Heo Young-saeng – "Let It Go" from Let It Go
- Idoling!!! – "Shōjo no Jidai Kara" from Sisters and Yarakai Heart
- Infinite – Evolution, Inspirit and Over the Top
- Kara – Step
- Nine Muses - Figaro
- Rainbow – So Girls

=== 2012 ===
- Beast – "Hateful Person" from Big OST
- Boyfriend – Love Style, Janus and "My Lady"
- Dramatic Blue – "Tearfully Beautiful"
- Infinite – Infinitize
- Kara – Pandora
- Nine Muses – Sweet Rendezvous
- Spica – "Russian Roulette" and "Lonely"
- D-Date – "Catch A Train"

=== 2013 ===
- Boyfriend – Seventh Mission
- Heo Young-saeng – She
- Infinite – New Challenge
- Kara – Full Bloom
- Nine Muses – "Dolls", Wild, Prima Donna and "Glue"
- Yoo Ji-ae – "Delight"

=== 2014 ===
- Boyfriend – Witch
- Infinite – Season 2
- Nicole – First Romance
- Spica – "Ghost"
- Stellar – Marionette and "Mask"

=== 2015 ===
- Romeo – "Lovesick" and "Target"
- Snuper – "Shall We Dance"
- Nicole - Something Special

=== 2016 ===
- Snuper – "Platonic Love", "Compass" and "Rain of Mind"
- 100% – "Time Leap"
- A.DE – Good Time
- Nicole - Don't Stop
- Nicole - Happy
- Nicole - Lunar

=== 2017 ===
- Lovelyz – "Emotion" and "The"
- 100% – "Sketchbook"
- Snuper – "Hide and Seek", "Back:Hug", "My Girl's Fox" and "The Star of Stars" (유성)
- Top Secret – "Time's Up", "She", "Something Special", "Can't Wait", "Mind Control", "Dumb" and "Up&Down"
- Target – "Tempest", "Atsui Omoi"
- Pick A Green (초록픽하나) from The Unit: Idol Rebooting Project – "내꺼 (You're Mine)"
- Weki Meki – "i-Teen Girls Special"

=== 2018 ===
- Infinite – "Pray (Maetal's Sorrow)"
- Target – "Still", "Awake" and "Afterwards"
- Golden Child – "Miracle", "It's U" and "Lady"
- Lovelyz – "Heal", "That Day" and "Lost N Found"
- Top Secret – "Love Story", "Paradise"
- SNUPER – "Like Star"

=== 2019 ===
- Target – "Beautiful"
- IZ – "EDEN"
- TST – "Wake Up"
- Goo Hara - "Midnight Queen"
- Goo Hara - "HELLO"

=== 2020 ===
- IZ – THE:IZ
- JEONG MIN - REWIND
- KEEMBO – Scandalous, 99, Scene

=== 2021 ===
- KEEMBO – Scandal, Whatever

=== 2022 ===
- Sanha - HELLO
- RoaD-B - Nonstop (Co-writers: Choi Yunho and Song Sooyoon)
- CSR - "Euratcha!"

=== 2023 ===
- n.SSign (group) - Melody
- NINE.i - Turn it off
