= Infinitize =

EP by Infinite
- Released: May 15, 2012
- Recorded: 2012
- Genre: K-pop; pop; dance-pop
- Length: 22:06
- Language: Korean
- Label: Woollim Entertainment
- Producer: Sweetune

Infinite chronology
Paradise (2011)	Infinitize (2012)	New Challenge (2013)

Singles from Infinitize
- 1. "Only Tears" Released: May 8, 2012; 2. "The Chaser" Released: May 15, 2012

Infinitize (stylized in all caps) is the third EP from the South Korean boyband Infinite. It was released on May 15, 2012. The title song "The Chaser" was used to promote the album. The track "Only Tears" was released on May 8, one week before the EP release as a prologue single. During June 29 until July 1, the group performed the song "In the Summer".

== Background ==
A music trailer of the group was uploaded into YouTube by Woollim Entertainment on March 12, announcing that the group will make a comeback in South Korea soon. After a successful debut in Japan with the singles BTD (Before the Dawn) and Be Mine, the group's agency, Woollim Entertainment, announced their comeback in South Korea with a new mini-album. On the same day, a teaser logo of the EP was revealed on the group's website. On May 2, their website was updated with the official comeback date, May 15, 2012. On May 5, it was revealed that the group will release a prologue song on May 8, one week before the EP release on their 700th day of debut. The prologue song is titled "Only Tears" (눈물만). The song was first played at Infinite's Second concert "Second Invasion – Evolution", in a solo act by member Sunggyu. On the same day the song was released, an album jacket teaser photo was unveiled on the group's website. On May 14, the track list of the full EP was revealed in the form of a video with short previews of each song accompanying the song titles.

== Composition ==
Infinite teamed up with Sweetune to produce the EP. The songs "The Chaser", "In the Summer", "Only Tears" and "I Like You" were written by Song Sooyoon, who also wrote "Be Mine" and "Paradise", which were released on the group's first studio album Over the Top. The intro song, "Infinitize", was written by J.Yoon. The songs "Feel So Bad" and "With..." were written by Kim Ina.

== Music video ==
A teaser video of the song "The Chaser" was released on May 11, on Woollim Entertainment's YouTube account. The music video premiered exclusively at Infinite's Showcase: The Mission, on May 15. After the showcase in Seoul, the music video was available on Woolim Entertainment's YouTube account, on their official website and on LOEN Entertainment's YouTube account.

== Promotions ==
=== The Chaser ===
Promotions of the song "The Chaser" on TV music shows started on May 17, on Mnet's show M! Countdown. They are also promoting the song on the shows Music Bank, Music Core, Inkigayo and Show Champion. The song "Only Tears" was used for the comeback week performances. In the performances, member L (Myungsoo) played a guitar and member Sungjong played a piano. At the date, the song won seven music show awards, three awards (also known as "Triple Crown") on M! Countdown: on May 31, on June 7, and on June 14, one on KBS' Music Bank on June 1, two mutizens on SBS' Inkigayo: on June 2 and June 10, and one on MBC Music's Show Champion on June 5. The last performance of the song was on KBS' Music Bank - Half-Year Special, on June 29, 2012, in a special stage along with the group Teen Top. At this same day, the group started performing the song "In the Summer" on the TV shows. It was performed on the shows Music Bank, Music Core and Inkigayo during June 29 until July 1. All promotions of the songs and the EP ended on July 1, on SBS' Inkigayo. The song was chosen as the No. 1 K-pop song of 2012 in Billboard and Billboard Korea's Top 20 Best K-Pop Songs of 2012.

=== Showcase: The Mission ===
On May 3, the group's website revealed a 'showcase plan' mission. In the website was stated that, on May 15, same day of the EP release, the group will be visiting 5 South Korean cities and complete a showcase in each city, all in one day. The cities stated were:

- Gwangju at 9AM
- Busan at 12PM
- Daegu at 2PM
- Daejeon at 5PM
- Seoul at 8PM

To travel to all 5 cities on time, a special helicopter with an infinity logo (∞) on it was used. The showcase was titled "20120515 Showcase – The Mission". A live-stream of the showcase was made on LOEN Entertainment's YouTube account starting at 6PM (KST) for international fans of the group who were not able to attend the showcases. The show broadcast was the Seoul showcase.

Showcase Setlist

based on Seoul's showcase

1. Infinitize (Opening)
2. The Chaser
3. Talk session
4. Only Tears
5. Talk session
6. Be Mine
7. The Chaser (Music video premiere)

== Track listing ==
Official track list
No.	Title	Lyrics	Music	Arrangement	Length
1.	"Infinitize"	J.Yoon	J.Yoon	J.Yoon	0:56
2.	"추격자" (The Chaser)	Song Sooyoon	Han Jaeho, Kim Seungsoo	Han Jaeho, Kim Seungsoo, Hong Seunghyun	3:21
3.	"Feel So Bad"	Kim Ina	J.Yoon	J.Yoon	3:19
4.	"그해여름" (In The Summer)	Song Sooyoon	Yue, Han Jaeho, Kim Seungsoo	Yue, Hong Seunghyun	3:35
5.	"눈물만" (Only Tears)	Song Sooyoon	Han Jaeho, Kim Seungsoo	Han Boram	3:53
6.	"니가좋다" (I Like You)	Song Sooyoon, Jang Dong-woo	Go Namsoo, Han Jaeho, Kim Seungsoo	Go Namsoo, Han Boram	2:56
7.	"With..."	Kim Ina	J.Yoon	Yue	4:11
Total length:					22:18

== Trivia ==
- Some parts of the song "In The Summer" can be heard on the hidden track of the album Over the Top, as well the hidden track on the Over The Top's repackage, Paradise.

== Charts ==
Chart	Peak position
Japan Oricon Weekly album chart	18
Japan Oricon Monthly album chart	32
South Korea Gaon Weekly album chart	2
South Korea Gaon Weekly domestic album chart	2
South Korea Gaon Monthly album chart	3
South Korea Gaon Mid-Year album chart	7
South Korea Gaon Yearly album chart	10

== Sales and certifications ==
Physical Sales

Album	Chart	Period Covered	Amount
Infinitize	Gaon Physical Album Chart	2012	140,277
Infinitize	Gaon Physical Album Chart	2013	16,753
Infinitize	Gaon Physical Album Chart	2014	2,583
Total (As of Date)			159,613

Album	Chart	Period Covered	Amount
Infinitize	Oricon Physical Album Chart	2012	13,345+

== Release history ==
Release dates and formats for Infinitize
Region	Date	Format	Label	Ref.
South Korea	May 15, 2012	Digital download; CD	Woollim; LOEN	
Japan	May 28, 2012	CD (Import disc)	Woollim; Japan Publications Trading	
