= BTD (disambiguation) =

BTD may refer to:

- "BTD (Before the Dawn)", a 2011 song by the South Korean boy band Infinite
- Bloons Tower Defense, a series of tower defense games
- Biotinidase, an enzyme encoded by the BTD gene
- British trade dollar, a silver coin minted by Great Britain to facilitate trade with the Far East
- Douglas BTD Destroyer, the 1940s American torpedo/dive-bomber
