= Top Seed =

Studio album by Infinite
- Released: January 8, 2018
- Recorded: 2017–2018
- Genre: Urban R&B; Metal; Pop Ballad
- Length: 42:37
- Language: Korean
- Label: Woollim Entertainment; LOEN
- Producer: Lee Jung-yeop (exec.)

Infinite chronology
Infinite Only (2016)	Top Seed (2018)	13egin (2023)

Singles from Top Seed
- 1. "Tell Me" Released: January 8, 2018

Top Seed is the third studio album by South Korean boy group Infinite. It was released on January 8, 2018, by Woollim Entertainment with the lead single "Tell Me". Top Seed was the group's first full album release since Season 2 (2014) and the group's first release since Infinite Only (2016). It marked the group's first release as a six-member group after former member Hoya left the group in August 2017. It also serves as their final release before their members' departure from Woollim Entertainment.

== Background and release ==
While fanmeeting on March 3, 2017, an unexpected black-and-white teaser video featuring individual shots and ended with the words "2017 May", which confirmed their next comeback schedule. On March 29, Woollim Entertainment announced that the filming of music video for new title track on March 30 had been postponed due to Sungkyu's rib injury.

On May 16, Woollim Entertainment confirmed that Infinite's comeback schedule in May had been postponed because Sungkyu had not fully recovered from his injury and would continue to receive treatment.

On August 30, following the departure of Hoya, Woollim Entertainment announced that Infinite would aim to make a comeback sometime before the end of 2017 after the members had wrapped up their solo activities.

On November 21, Woollim Entertainment confirmed that Infinite would make a comeback in January 2018 and that they had recorded the album and were making necessary modifications.

On December 11, a Woollim Entertainment representative revealed that the group had completed filming a music video for the album's title track.

Woollim Entertainment began releasing video teasers on January 2 at Midnight KST and confirmed Infinite would return on January 8 with their third full album and the lead single "Tell Me". In the music video teaser for "Tell Me", the men appear to be in a dream, and some choreography is shown. "Tell Me" is directed by Sunny Visual, who directed "Undoable" by Jan Dong-eun, "What You Like" bg Lee Gi-kwang, and "Only U" by Laboum.

== Composition ==
The title track "Tell Me" was written and composed by BLSSD, formerly known as Bee of the songwriting team Rphabet; he wrote the single, the instrumental intro "Begin" and co-wrote "Wind", an ebullient synthpop track.

The sixth track "Pray" was written and composed by SWEETUNE. Dongwoo also made the rap lyrics on "Pray (Mattel's Sorrow)".

The album features three solo tracks by the members Dongwoo, L, and Sungjong. Dongwoo composed his solo track "TGIF" with GALLERY. L composed his solo track "Reminsce" with Jeong Min-ji. He describes his song "very lyrical". He sang the band version, but the original for the fans. Sungjong's solo track "Love Song" was written by Misung.

== Promotions ==
The group held their comeback showcase for its third studio album, "Top Seed", at Blue Square Hall in central Seoul on January 8, 2018. It was broadcast live on Naver's V-Live.

The group started to perform their title track "Tell Me" on January 9, on Mnet M! Countdown and continue to perform on KBS2 Music Bank, MBC Music Core, SBS Inkigayo, and MBC Music Show Champion. They also performed their b-side track "No More" for their comeback stage. They won five times on music programs.

The members also guest on variety shows such as Weekly Idol, Comedy Big League, Battle Trip, and Hello Counselor.

== Track listing ==
No.	Title	Lyrics	Music	Arrangement	Length
1.	"Begin"	BLSSD	BLSSD	BLSSD	1:30
2.	"Tell Me"	BLSSD	BLSSD	BLSSD	3:51
3.	"Synchronise"	Moon Sulli	Andreas Moe; Christian Fast; Ian Dench; Henrik Nordenback	Henrik Nordenback	4:00
4.	"No More"	Jeong Gu-hyun	Jeong Gu-hyun	Jeong Gu-hyun	3:22
5.	"TGIF" (Dong Woo solo)	GALLERY; Dongwoo	GALLERY; Dongwoo	GALLERY	3:22
6.	"Pray" (기도) (메텔의 슬픔)	SWEETUNE	SWEETUNE	SWEETUNE	3:24
7.	"Why Me" (왜 날)	SEION	SEION	SEION	5:14
8.	"Wind" (분다)	BLSSD; Razer (Rphabet)	BLSSD; Razer (Rphabet)	BLSSD; Razer (Rphabet)	3:47
9.	"I Hate"	Misfit; Ollounder; LEEZ	Ollounder; LEEZ	Ollounder; LEEZ	3:39
10.	"Reminisce" (지난 날) (L solo)	L; Jeong Min-ji	Kim Yong-sin; Kim Tae-sung; Gabriel Brunell Brande	Kim Yong-sin	3:44
11.	"Love Song" (고백) (Sung Jong solo)	Misung	Jeong Gu-hyun	Jeong Gu-hyun	3:12
12.	"Begin Again"	Jinli (Full8loom)	Face of Glory (Full8loom); Jinli (Full8loom)	Face of Glory (Full8loom); Jake K (Full8loom)	3:32
Total length:					42:49

== Charts ==
=== Weekly charts ===
Chart (2018)	Peak position
South Korean Weekly Albums (Gaon)	1
Japan Weekly Albums (Oricon)	17
US World Albums (Billboard)	4

=== Monthly charts ===
Chart (2018)	Peak position
South Korean Monthly Albums (Gaon)	4

== Sales ==
Country	Sales
South Korea (Gaon)	81,703
Japan (Oricon)	3,346

== Release history ==
Region	Date	Format	Label
Various	January 8, 2018	Digital download	Woollim Entertainment; LOEN Entertainment
South Korea	January 8, 2018	CD, music download	Woollim Entertainment; LOEN Entertainment
