= Destiny (single album) =

Single album by Infinite
- Released: July 16, 2013
- Recorded: 2013
- Genre: Electronic; R&B
- Length: 15:39
- Label: Woollim
- Producer: Rphabet; Shim Eun-ji; Kim Ji-seon; Ha Jeong-ho; STORYTELLER

Infinite chronology
New Challenge (2013)	Destiny (2013)	Season 2 (2014)

Destiny is the second single album of South Korean boy band Infinite. It was released on July 16, 2013 in both digital and physical format with the song of the same title "Destiny" as the promotional track.

== Background ==
After their successful promotion in March with their fourth EP New Challenge, it was reported that the group is preparing for a comeback mid-July of the same year.

On May 22, 2013 the members headed over to Universal Studios in California to film their next music video. They had the honor of being the first K-pop group to obtain permission to film where Hollywood movies such as 'Transformers' and 'The Amazing Spiderman' were filmed. Previously, access was restricted to popular stars such as Lady Gaga and Chris Brown. Woollim Entertainment stated that, "They're filming a new MV that's on the scale of Hollywood blockbusters. A total investment of 1,000,000,000 KRW (approximately $890,000 USD) went into this new MV. They'll be filming not just at Universal Studios but also 4-5 other locations across Los Angeles."

On July 1, 2013 Infinite’s official website replaced its Man in Love theme with a new design. The front page had been replaced over by a splash header, featuring a brand-new logo and the words, "Destiny". The redesigned logo retained the signature figure-eight with a new chrome colouring.

With Infinite members signalling a return with darker concept for Destiny, on midnight of July 2, Infinite released the teaser for Destiny, showing a barren and deserted land containing only ruins of aeroplanes and the members of the band, roaming in an apparently abandoned city. A week later, on July 9, Woollim Entertainment updated its website with new photos of the Infinite members, with the members dressed in the new leather outfits for the upcoming promotions.

The following day with the coming release of the single, Infinite unveiled the track list for Destiny on its official site on July 10. The four songs were announced to be Destiny, Inception, 너에게 간다 (Going to You) and 엄마 (Mother). The group revealed a short teaser on July 11, taking fans to the set of Universal Studios in Los Angeles, where the group filmed the music video for Destiny. In the promotional video, the staff members praised Infinite and the quality level of the music video to come. Through a preview video released on July 12, Infinite fans were able to listen to previews of the four tracks included in the new album.

July 16, 2013 marked the release of the album alongside the music video for Destiny. The video was marked ver. B as there is a yet to be officially released "Ver.A". The music video is directed by Hong Won-ki of ZanyBros. On the same day, behind the scenes video for Destiny was released. Following the film shoot, the group took a road trip up to Las Vegas for a magazine photo shoot.

On July 19, 2013 Woollim Entertainment confirmed that there is Version A of the Destiny Music video. Woollim Entertainment explained that the version released was actually an edited version of the original. The video was edited after the unfortunate Asiana Airlines Flight 214 crash in order to show respect for the victims of the event. Thus, all the plane scenes that were included in the MV had been cut out. The agency commented, "We are currently discussing our plans about whether to release. We are discussing towards the direction of releasing it, but the exact time period has not yet been decided.

== Composition ==
The title track Destiny is written and produced by Rphabet. It takes inspiration from a lot of the complex-electro house music made popular a couple years ago. It marked the first time that the group has worked with them, a change from the previous producer Sweetune, who returned to work on their following single Request.

Woolim Entertainment also stated, "The mastering for Infinite's album was done by Tom Coyne, who as worked with Beyonce, Chris Brown and Adele.

== Promotion ==
Infinite returned with title song Destiny and Inception in the 2013 Mnet 20's Choice Awards on July 18. With a strong fan response, Infinite went on to win the Best Global Touring Artist Award later in the night.

The group continued promoting the song on other music broadcast shows, M! Countdown on Korean cable channel M.net, Music Bank on KBS, Music Core on MBC, Inkigayo on SBS and Show Champion on MBC Music.

While the group will performed the title song "Destiny" on all stages, a second song from the single was added to each. The additional song differed for each broadcast station. Woollim Entertainment stated, “After receiving interest and love in the other songs besides the main track, we are planning on showcasing Inception, Going To You, and Mom.”.

During the comeback week of promotions Infinite performed 'Mother' in Music Bank on July 19, 'Going To You' in Music Core on July 20 and 'Inception' in Inkigayo on July 21 and in Show Champion on July 24.

== Track listing ==
Official track list
No.	Title	Lyrics	Music	Length
1.	"Destiny"	Rphabet	Rphabet	3:53
2.	"Inception"	Shim Eun Ji, Kim Ji Seon	Shim Eun Ji	3:31
3.	"너에게 간다" (Going To You)	Ha Jeong Ho, STORYTELLER	Ha Jeong Ho, STORYTELLER	3:32
4.	"엄마" (Mother)	Shim Eun Ji	Shim Eun Ji	4:43
Total length:				15:39

== Charts ==
Chart	Peak position
Weekly Album Chart (Gaon)	1
Monthly Album Chart (Gaon)	1

== Music show awards ==
The following is a list of Infinite wins for the song Destiny on Korea's televised music broadcast shows. Show Champion is aired on MBC Music every Wednesday, M! Countdown is on Korean cable channel M.net every Thursday, Music Bank on KBS every Friday, Music Core on MBC every Saturday and Inkigayo on SBS every Sunday.

Music show wins
Song	Program	Date
"Destiny"	M! Countdown (Mnet)	July 25, 2013
"Destiny"	Music Core (MBC)	July 27, 2013
"Destiny"	Inkigayo (SBS)	July 28, 2013
"Destiny"	Show Champion (MBC Music)	July 31, 2013

== Release history ==
Country	Date	Format	Label
South Korea	July 16, 2013	Digital download	Woollim Entertainment; LOEN Entertainment
South Korea	July 16, 2013	CD	Woollim Entertainment; LOEN Entertainment

== See also ==
- List of most expensive music videos
