= She's Back (song) =

2010 song by the South Korean boy band Infinite

Single by Infinite

from the album First Invasion
- Released: August 4, 2010
- Recorded: 2010
- Genre: K-pop, dance, electropop
- Length: 3:15
- Label: Woollim Entertainment
- Songwriters: Song Soo Yun, Mithra Jin, Han Jaeho, Kim Seungsoo
- Producer: Kim Seungsoo

Infinite Korean singles chronology
"Come Back Again" (2010)	"She's Back" (2010)	"BTD (Before the Dawn)" (2011)

Music video
- "She's Back" (Korean version) on YouTube

"She's Back" is a song released by the South Korean boy band Infinite. The song is the second single from their debut mini album First Invasion and it was released as a digital single on August 4, 2010. The song was later re-recorded in Japanese and will be used as the group's third Japanese single, released on August 29, 2012.

== Composition ==
The song was written by Song Soo Yun, Han Jaeho, Kim Seungsoo (also known as Sweetune) and Mithra Jin from Epik High. It was produced by Kim Seungsoo. Sweetune is also known for producing the songs "BTD (Before the Dawn)", "Be Mine" and "Paradise" of the group.

== Promotions ==
The group started promoting the track on August 5, 2010, on Mnet's M! Countdown, following the promotions of their debut single "Come Back Again". The song was also promoted on the shows Music Bank, Show! Music Core and Inkigayo. The promotions of the song and of the EP First Invasion ended on September 11, on MBC's Music Core.

== Music video ==
A teaser of the music video was released on August 1, 2010. The music video was released on August 4, 2010, along with the digital release of the single. The music video feature the group playing on a beach and on a swimming pool. It also features scenes of the group singing the song together.

== Track listing ==
Korean digital single

1. She's Back - 3:15
2. She's Back (Remix) - 3:11

Japanese Tsutaya rental single

1. She's Back - 3:15
2. She's Back (Music video)

== Chart performance ==
The song debuted at the number 80 in Gaon's singles chart on the week of August 8 and climbed to the position 66 on the following week, making the peak of the song. On the following week the song dropped to number 95. The song was more successful than the previous single "Come Back Again".

=== Charts ===
Chart (2010)	Peak position
Gaon Weekly singles	66
Gaon Monthly singles	99

== Japanese version ==
"She's Back"
- Regular edition cover

Single by Infinite

from the album Koi ni Ochiru Toki
- B-side: "TO-RA-WA" (Japanese version)
- Released: August 29, 2012
- Recorded: 2010–2012
- Genre: J-pop, dance, electropop
- Length: 3:16
- Label: Woollim Contents
- Songwriters: Song Soo Yun, Mithra Jin, Han Jaeho, Kim Seungsoo

Infinite Japanese singles chronology
"Be Mine" (2012)	"She's Back" (2012)

Music video
- "She's Back" (Japanese version) on YouTube

Two years later after its original release, it was announced that the song was re-recorded in Japanese and was used as their third single in Japan. It was released on August 29, 2012, in 2 editions: CD+DVD limited and Regular edition.

=== Composition ===
All songs from the single were previously released in Korean on the group's debut EP First Invasion. The remix of the song "She's Back" was previously released on the digital single of the Korean version of the song. The B-side "TO-RA-WA" is a Japanese version of the song "Come Back Again".

=== Music video ===
A preview of the music video was released on July 20, 2012. The full music video was released on July 26, 2012, on Woollim Entertainment's YouTube account. The Japanese version of the music video follows the same concept of the Korean music video.

=== Track listing ===
All editions tracklist
No.	Title	Lyrics	Music	Length
1.	"She's Back" (Japanese version)	Song Soo Yun, Han Jae-ho, Kim Seung-Soo, Mithra Jin, Yumiko (Japanese lyrics)	Han Jae-ho, Kim Seung-Soo	3:16
2.	"TO-RA-WA" (Japanese version)	Kim Boo-min, Shinichi Yasuoka, Tetsuro Honda (Japanese lyrics), Tsuyoshi Shimizu Hiroshi (Japanese rap lyrics)	Hitchhiker	3:08
3.	"She's Back" (Korean Remix version)	Song Soo Yun, Han Jae-ho, Kim Seung-soo, Mithra Jin	Han Jae-ho, Kim Seung-soo	3:11
Total length:				9:32

DVD (CD+DVD Limited version)
No.	Title	Length
1.	"She's Back" (Music video - Japanese version)
2.	"She's Back" (Music video - Making-of)

=== Charts ===
==== Oricon ====
Oricon Chart	Peak	Debut sales	Sales total
Daily Singles Chart	3	23,529	38,998+
Weekly Singles Chart	3	38,998	38,998+

== Release history ==
Release dates and formats for "She's Back"
Region	Date	Format	Label
South Korea	August 8, 2010	Digital download	Woollim Entertainment
Japan	February 23, 2011	Rental single	Woollim Entertainment
Japan	August 29, 2012	CD single, Digital download	Woollim Entertainment
