= Reality (Infinite EP) =

EP by Infinite
- Released: July 13, 2015
- Recorded: 2015
- Genre: K-pop; dance-pop; Electronic; R&B
- Length: 22:38
- Language: Korean
- Label: Woollim; SM C&C; LOEN

Infinite chronology
| Season 2 (2014) | Reality (2015) | Infinite Only (2016) |

Singles from Reality
- 1. "Bad" Released: July 13, 2015

Reality is the fifth mini-album released by the South Korean boy band Infinite. It was released on July 13, 2015, by Woollim Label. The album features seven tracks with "Bad" serving as its title track.

== Background ==
A teaser image for the group's comeback album was revealed on June 30, 2015, on the group's homepage. Thus, confirming that the group would be making a comeback soon. Subsequent images revealing the names of the tracks were also released in the following weeks. On July 2, a representative of Woollim Entertainment confirmed the date of the boy group's comeback to be July 13, 2015, a little over a year since their last album.

== Track listing ==
Reality track listing
| No. | Title | Lyrics | Music | Length |
|---|---|---|---|---|
| 1. | "Betting" | | Rphabet | 1:15 |
| 2. | "Bad" | Rphabet | Rphabet | 3:37 |
| 3. | "Moonlight" | Lee Gi, C-NO | Lee Gi, C-NO | 3:27 |
| 4. | "Footsteps" (발걸음; balgeol-eum) | J.Yoon, Hoya, Dongwoo | J.Yoon | 3:23 |
| 5. | "Between Me and You" (마주보며 서 있어 majubomyeo seo iss-eo) | KZ, Jeon Da Un, CRAZYMIND, Hoya, Dongwoo | KZ, Jeon Da Un, CRAZYMIND | 4:16 |
| 6. | "Love Letter" (러브레터 leobeuleteo) | Sweetch | Sweetch | 3:34 |
| 7. | "Take care of the Ending (Up to You)" (엔딩을 부탁해 ending-eul butaghae) | Seom Eun Ji, Hoya, Dongwoo | Seom Eun Ji | 3:13 |
| Total length: | | | | 22:38 |

== Charts ==
Chart performance for Reality
| Chart (2015) | Peak position |
|---|---|
| Gaon Album Chart (weekly) | 1 |
| Gaon Album Chart (monthly) | 3 |
| Gaon Album Chart (year-end) | 12 |

== Music program awards ==
The following is a list of Infinite wins for the song "Bad" on Korea's televised music broadcast shows. The Show is aired on SBS MTV every Tuesday, Show Champion is aired on MBC Music every Wednesday, M! Countdown is on Korean cable channel M.net every Thursday, Music Bank on KBS every Friday and Music Core on MBC every Saturday.

Music program awards
| Song | Program | Date |
|---|---|---|
| "Bad" | The Show (SBS MTV) | July 21, 2015 |
| "Bad" | Show Champion (MBC Music) | July 22, 2015 |
| "Bad" | M! Countdown (Mnet) | July 23, 2015 |
| "Bad" | Music Bank (KBS) | July 24, 2015 |
| "Bad" | Music Core (MBC) | July 25, 2015 |
| "Bad" | The Show (SBS MTV) | July 28, 2015 |

== Release history ==
Release dates and formats for Reality
| Region | Format | Date | Label |
|---|---|---|---|
| South Korea | CD; digital download | July 13, 2015 | SM C&C; Woollim; LOEN |
| Various | Digital download | July 13, 2015 | SM C&C; Woollim; LOEN |
