= The Chaser (song) =

Single by Infinite

from the EP Infinitize
- Released: May 15, 2012
- Recorded: 2012
- Genre: Synthpop
- Length: 3:23
- Label: Woollim
- Songwriter: Song Soo-yoon
- Producers: Han Jae-ho; Kim Seung-soo; Hong Seung-hyun

Infinite singles chronology
"Only Tears" (2012)	"The Chaser" (2012)	"Man in Love" (2013)

Music video
- "The Chaser" on YouTube

"The Chaser" (Korean: 추격자; RR: Chugyeogja) is a song recorded by South Korean boy group Infinite. It was released as the second single from the group's third extended play Infinitize, which was released through Woollim Entertainment on May 15, 2012. The song received critical acclaim, and was named the third best K-pop song of the 2010s by Billboard as well as one of Rolling Stone's best boy band songs of all time.

== Reception ==
"The Chaser" on critic lists
Publication/critic	List	Rank	Ref.
Billboard	20 Best K-Pop Songs of 2012	1	
Billboard	100 Greatest K-Pop Songs of the 2010s	3	
Pitchfork	20 Essential K-Pop Songs	No order	
Rolling Stone	75 Greatest Boy Band Songs of All Time	55	
Rolling Stone	100 Greatest Songs in the History of Korean Pop Music	51	

== Music video and promotion ==
A teaser video of the song "The Chaser" was released on May 11, on Woollim Entertainment's YouTube account. The music video premiered exclusively at Infinite's Showcase: The Mission, on May 15. After the showcase in Seoul, the music video was available on Woolim Entertainment's YouTube account, on their official website and on LOEN Entertainment's YouTube account. Domestic promotions for "The Chaser" on weekly music programs began on May 17 on Mnet's M! Countdown.

== Accolades ==
Awards and nominations
Year	Organization	Award	Result	Ref.
2012	Mnet Asian Music Awards	Best Music Video	Nominated	
2012	Mnet Asian Music Awards	Best Dance Performance – Male Group	Nominated	
2012	SBS MTV Best of the Best	Best Dance Music Video	Won	

Music program wins (7 total)
Program	Date	Ref.
M Countdown	May 31, 2012	
M Countdown	June 7, 2012	
M Countdown	June 14, 2012	
Music Bank	June 1, 2012	
Inkigayo	June 3, 2012	
Inkigayo	June 10, 2012	
Show Champion	June 5, 2012	

"The Chaser" on select listicles
Publication	Year	List	Rank	Ref.
Billboard	2012	20 Best K-pop Songs of 2012	1	

== Charts ==
=== Weekly charts ===
Chart (2012)	Peak position
South Korea (Gaon)	7
South Korea (K-pop Hot 100)	8

=== Year-end charts ===
Chart (2012)	Position
South Korea (Gaon)	71
