= Infinite Only =

EP by Infinite
- Released: September 19, 2016
- Recorded: 2016
- Genre: K-pop; Dark-pop; R&B
- Length: 24:47
- Language: Korean
- Label: Woollim; LOEN

Infinite chronology
Reality (2015)	Infinite Only (2016)	Top Seed (2018)

Singles from Infinite Only
- 1. "The Eye" Released: September 19, 2016

Infinite Only is the sixth extended play released by the South Korean boy band, Infinite. It was released on September 19, 2016, by Woollim Entertainment. It is also the last album to feature member Hoya, before his departure from the group in August 2017.

== Background and released ==
On August 30, Infinite released teaser video and confirmed the upcoming new released date will be on September 19. On September 1, Infinite released "Logo Expansion" teaser video and confirmed the title of their new album, Infinite Only. From September 4 to September 11, Infinite released individual teaser images and videos. On September 12, Infinite released a group teaser image. On September 13, the title track "The Eye" teaser video was released, along with the album track list consisting of seven tracks. On September 18, an album preview was uploaded to Woollim's official YouTube channel. The official music video for "The Eye" and the group's sixth extended play was released on September 19.

== Track listing ==
No.	Title	Lyrics	Music	Arrangement	Length
1.	"Eternity"		BEE of Rphabet	BEE of Rphabet	1:36
2.	"태풍" (The Eye)	Jeon Gandi	BEE of Rphabet	BEE of Rphabet	4:00
3.	"Air"	1Take; Trinity	1Take; TAK; Trinity	TAK	3:42
4.	"One Day"	Razer of Rphabet; Hoya; Dongwoo	Razer of Rphabet; Hoya	Razer of Rphabet	3:42
5.	"True Love"	Lee Joohyung (Monotree); GDLO (Monotree); Hoya; Dongwoo	Lee Joohyung (Monotree); GDLO (Monotree)	Lee Joohyung (Monotree); GDLO (Monotree)	3:29
6.	"고마워" (Thank You)	Razer of Rphabet; Strike	Razer of Rphabet; Strike	Razer of Rphabet; Strike	4:11
7.	"Zero"	Oreo; Hoya; Dongwoo	Oreo	Oreo	4:04
Total length:					24:47

== Awards and nominations ==
=== Music program awards ===
Song	Program	Date
"The Eye"	M! Countdown (Mnet)	September 29, 2016
"The Eye"	Music Bank (KBS)	September 30, 2016
"The Eye"	Inkigayo (SBS)	October 2, 2016

== Release history ==
Region	Date	Format	Label
South Korea	September 19, 2016	CD, digital download	Woollim Entertainment; LOEN Entertainment
Worldwide	September 19, 2016	Digital download	Woollim Entertainment; LOEN Entertainment
