= Infinite (band) =

South Korean boy band

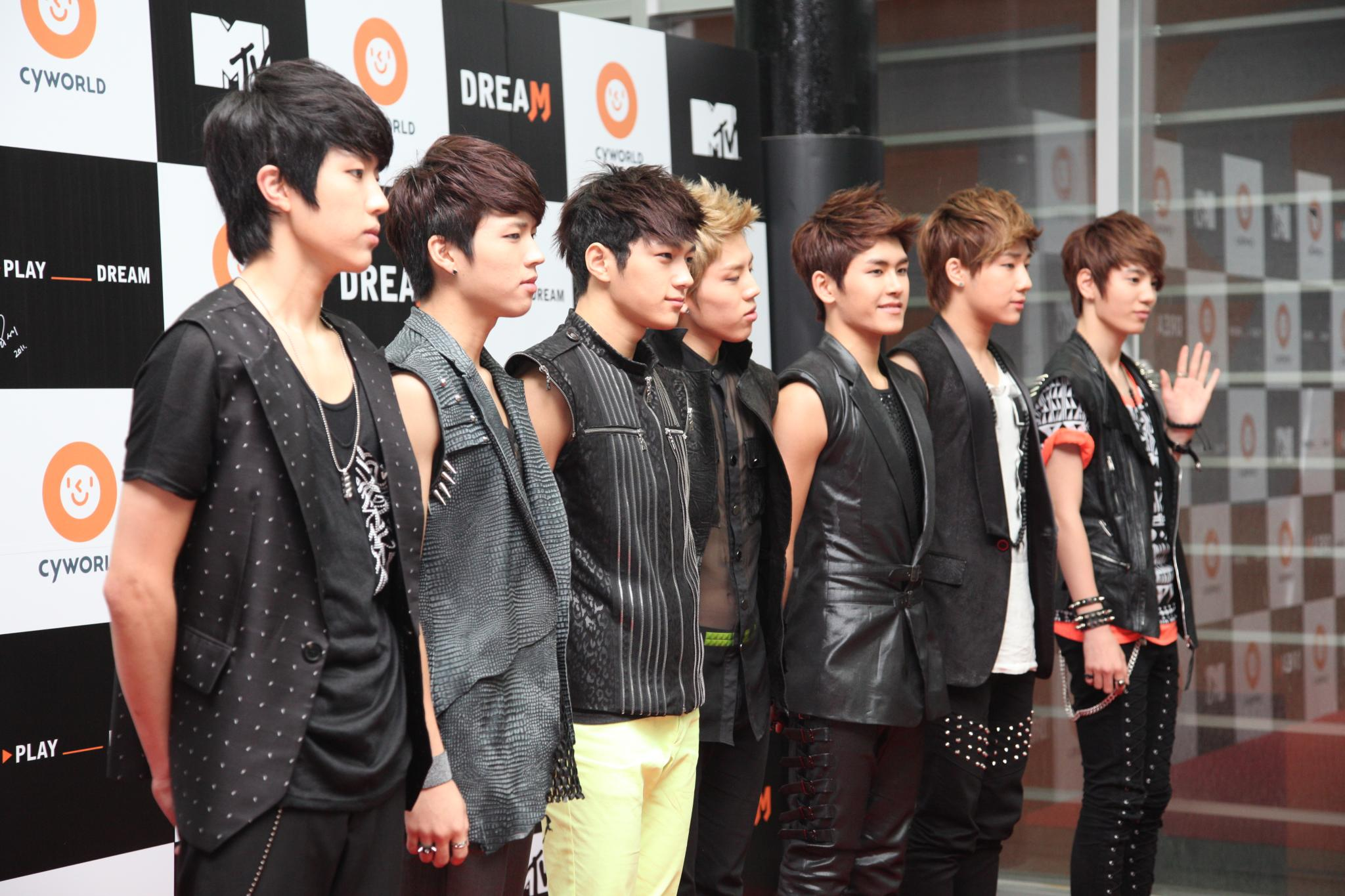
- Infinite in 2011

Background information
- Origin: Seoul, South Korea
- Genres: K-pop; Synth-pop; Pop rock; R&B; electronic
- Years active: 2010–present
- Labels: Woollim; Infinite Company; Universal D
- Spinoffs: Infinite H; Infinite F
- Members: Sungkyu; Dongwoo; Woohyun; Sungyeol; L; Sungjong
- Past members: Hoya
- Website: infinite.bstage.in

Infinite (Korean: 인피니트; stylized in all caps) is a South Korean boy band formed in 2010 by Woollim Entertainment. The group is composed of six members: Sungkyu, Dongwoo, Woohyun, Sungyeol, L, and Sungjong. Infinite was originally a seven-piece group; Hoya departed from the group on August 30, 2017.

Infinite debuted in June 2010 with their EP First Invasion. In 2012, the single "The Chaser" was named Billboard's third best K-pop song of the 2010s decade and was included in Rolling Stone's list of 75 Greatest Boy Band Songs of All Time in 2020. Billboard subsequently launched their K-pop column "K-Town" with Infinite in January 2013. In March of that year, Infinite's fourth EP New Challenge sold over 160,000 copies in South Korea alone, making it among the best-selling albums of 2013, with the single "Man in Love" also experiencing success. Shortly after this, Infinite became the first Korean artist to obtain permission to film at Universal Studios Hollywood for their second single album Destiny. In 2014, Infinite became the first Korean act to top Billboard's Emerging Artists Chart.

Infinite are known for their highly synchronized dancing and choreography as well as their live vocals. They have also endorsed several brands including Samsung and Pepsi, and were the ambassadors for UNICEF's 2012 Birthday Campaign. The group placed within the top 20 on the Forbes Korea Power Celebrity 40 rankings in 2013 and 2014.

== Background ==
Prior to Infinite's debut, Woollim Entertainment was a small company that housed only alternative artists, primarily depending on the activities of indie-rock band Nell and popular hip-hop group Epik High. Woollim's plans to debut their first idol group, which were first revealed in early 2010, came after Epik High's departure from the agency in 2008 and a noticeable increase in popularity of K-pop at the time. Attention was first drawn to Infinite before their debut when it was announced that Epik High had merged their new independent label with Woollim and were playing an active role in the debut of the new idol group. Infinite was marketed as a group that, despite being a K-pop idol band, would remain close to Woollim's roots of alternative music by releasing songs with a unique genre that can be differentiated from other singers in the industry.

The name "Infinite" was initially suggested by MC the Max member J.Yoon, and was ultimately chosen as the group's official name amongst other options including "Big Dipper", "Blackberry", and "Super Sonic". "Infinite" can be understood to convey the limitless possibilities of Infinite, representing the fact that Infinite will continue to grow and develop endlessly, without being restrained by any boundaries.

== History ==
=== 2010: Debut ===
Prior to their debut, Infinite participated in the 2010 Winter Olympics by providing vocals in the chorus of Epik High's supporting song.

L, Sungkyu, Woohyun, and Sungjong appeared in Epik High's music video "Run" while Hoya and Dongwoo served as backup dancers during music shows performances. From April to May, Infinite appeared on Mnet's reality television show You Are My Oppa, where the members were introduced to a female high school student (Lovelyz's Yoo Ji-ae) at their residence and were tasked to provide her packed meals and help her with homework. Epik High co-starred on the program.

Infinite released their debut mini-album First Invasion and its lead single "Come Back Again" on June 9, 2010. They also promoted the song "She's Back" from the same album.

=== 2011: Over the Top and advancement into Japan ===
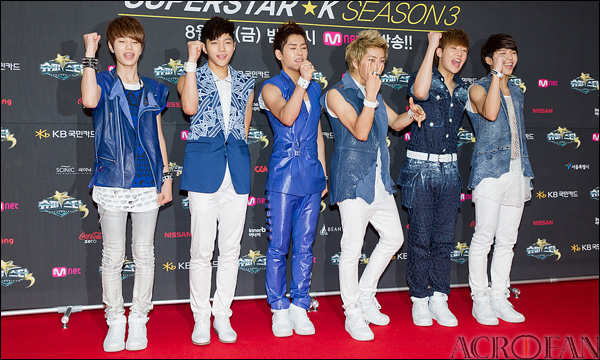
Infinite in August 2011

The group's second mini album Evolution was released on January 7. The group promoted it with the lead single "Before the Dawn (BTD)". The group entered the Music Bank K-chart for the first time.

Infinite made their comeback with their first single album Inspirit. In the music charts, the group finally ran from the top 30 to the top 40, and also went up to the top 10 in the Music Bank K-chart.

Their first studio album Over the Top was released on July 21 along with the music video of their title track "Be Mine". They received their first music show first place award at M Countdown on September 1 and received a "Double Crown" for winning two consecutive #1 places at M! Countdown. Following the success of "Be Mine", Infinite re-released Over the Top as a repackaged album titled Paradise, along with its title track of the same name, on September 26. On October 9, Infinite came first on Inkigayo for Paradise. They then won their second trophy with Paradise on October 13 on M! Countdown.

Infinite unofficially debuted in Japan with their first Japanese single "To-Ra-Wa" on January 26, which was a Japanese version of their Korean debut song, "Come Back Again". Immediately after its release, their Evolution mini album hit #3 on real-time charts for sales in Korea. The song was the top downloaded ringtone on the daily charts of the K-Pop section of Japan's top mobile website. Infinite released various rental singles including "She's Back", "BTD (Before The Dawn)", and "Nothing's Over" before they officially debuted in Japan.

Infinite made their official Japanese debut with the release of the Japanese version of "BTD" on November 19. The B-side for the single is "Can U Smile", a remake of a track from their 2nd mini album Evolution. It is the third track of their first single album Inspirit.

On December 5, Infinite released their first Christmas song, "White Confession".

=== 2012: First concert and Infinitize ===
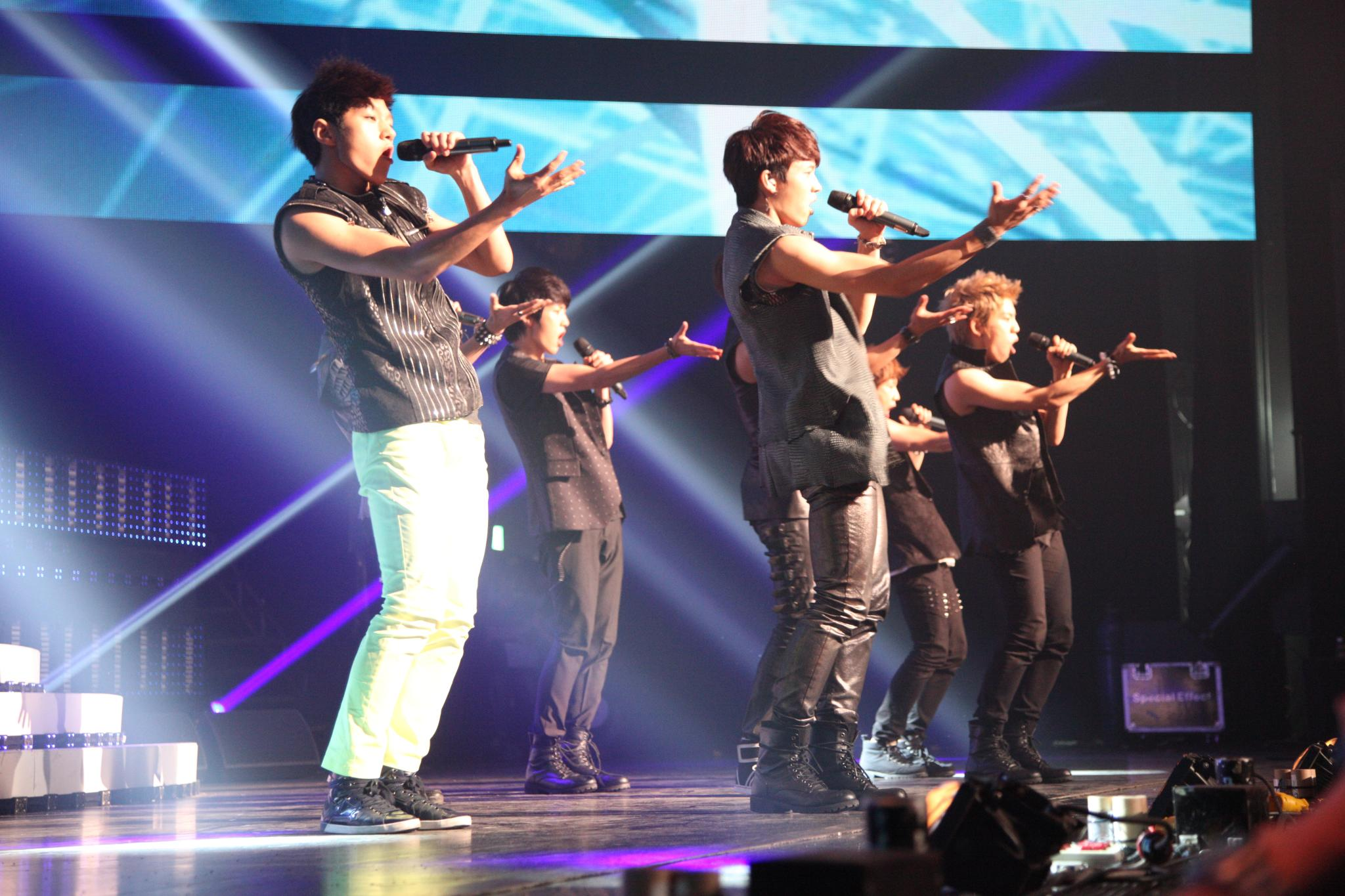
Infinite performing at Cyworld Dream Music Festival in 2011

Infinite held their first concert 2012 Infinite Concert "Second Invasion" in Seoul's Olympic Stadium on February 11–12 and in Tokyo International Forum on February 25–26. The encore concert, 2012 Infinite Concert "Second Invasion Evolution", was held in Seoul's Olympic Stadium on April 1.

The group's second Japanese single album was released on April 18. It included the Japanese version of their song "Be Mine" as its title track, as well as a Japanese version of "Julia". The single peaked at #2 in both the Oricon Daily and Weekly Charts. Total reported sales amounted to at least 54,218 copies.

On May 15, the group's third mini album Infinitize was released. The lead single "The Chaser" swept domestic music charts upon release and achieved a digital all-kill. On June 14, Infinite obtained their first triple crown with "The Chaser" on M! Countdown. At the end of the year, Billboard named "The Chaser" the number one K-pop song of the year.

=== 2013–2014: New Challenge, first world tour and Season 2 ===
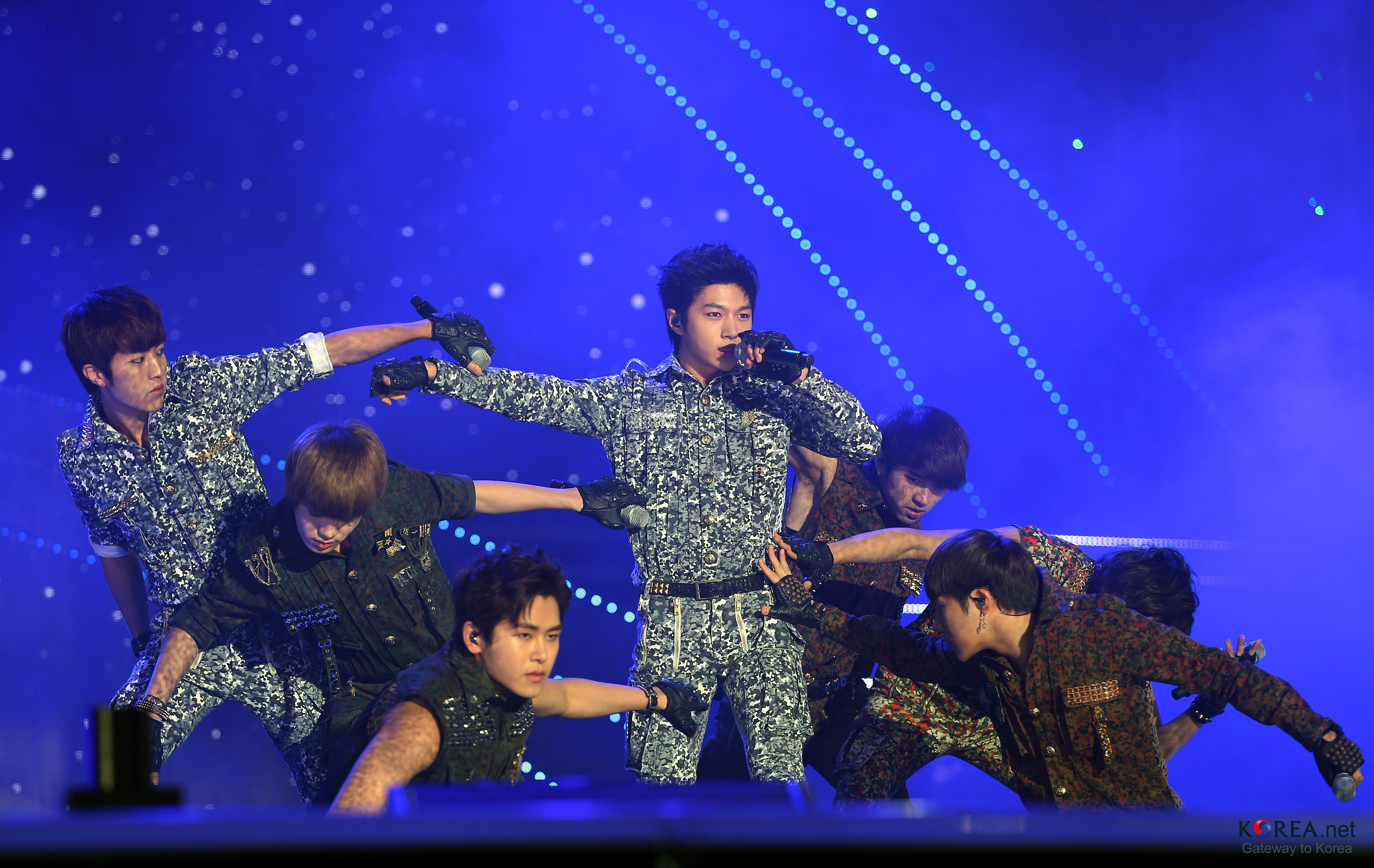
Infinite performing at the KPOP World Festival in 2013

On March 21, the group released their fourth mini album New Challenge. The lead single was titled "Man in Love", which took seven trophies on music shows during its promotion period.

The group released their first Japanese debut album, Koi ni Ochiru Toki, on June 6. It took the #1 place on the Oricon's albums chart for the week of June 3 to 9 with 69,647 copies sold.

The group then released their second single, "Destiny", on July 16. The group first performed "Destiny" at the 2013 Mnet 20's Choice Awards on July 18 and began promotional performances on MBC's July 20 episode of Show! Music Core and various music programs.

On August 9, Infinite began their first world tour named One Great Step in Seoul's Olympic Gymnastics Arena. The tour included shows in over 20 cities and 10 countries across Asia, North America, and Europe to audiences totalling over 250,000.

On January 16, 2014 Mnet released a preview for the group's new reality show, This is INFINITE. The show aired on February 6.

On February 28 and March 1, Infinite returned to the Seoul Olympic Gymnastics Arena for One Great Step Returns, their first world tour encore.

On April 10, 2014, Infinite released their instrumental album The Origin. Prior to this release, Infinite released the instrumental music video for their song "BTD (Before the Dawn)", which featured never-before-seen footage from the original "BTD" music video.

On May 12, Woollim Entertainment confirmed in an interview with Newsen that Infinite's second studio album, Season 2, would be released on May 21. Prior to the release of the album, Infinite held a showcase in South Korea, Japan and Taiwan, titled 1.2.3. The group held the first showcase in Japan on May 19 and Taiwan on May 20 before performing in South Korea on May 21. On May 21, their second studio album with title Last Romeo was released. Following the album release, Infinite held a showcase at the Jamsil Student Gymnasium in Seoul. A repackaged edition for Season 2 titled Be Back was released on July 22.

Infinite held their second summer concert 2014 Infinite Concert: That Summer 2 in Seoul's Blue Square Samsung Card Hall with the expected total audience of 15.000 fans. It consisted of 7 shows starting from August 7–10, 2014 and August 14–16, 2014 respectively.

On September 11, the group had their first Billboard No. 1, with their single "Last Romeo" topping the Billboard Twitter Emerging Artists chart, becoming the first Korean act to do so. "Last Romeo" also hit No. 33 on Billboard Twitter Top Tracks.

On December 18, Infinite released the music video their new Japanese single, "Dilemma", composed by renowned Japanese musician and guitarist Tomoyasu Hotei. The single was subsequently released on December 24 and used as the centerpiece of their upcoming Dilemma Tour in Japan in early 2015.

=== 2015: Reality and second world tour ===
Infinite embarked on their third Japan concert tour 2015 Japan Tour - Dilemma on February 1 in Fukuoka, following held in Tokyo, Osaka and Aichi. On April 29, they a revealed promotional video (PV) for 24 Hours. 24 Hours came in third on the Oricon Weekly Chart with 56,266 copies sold.

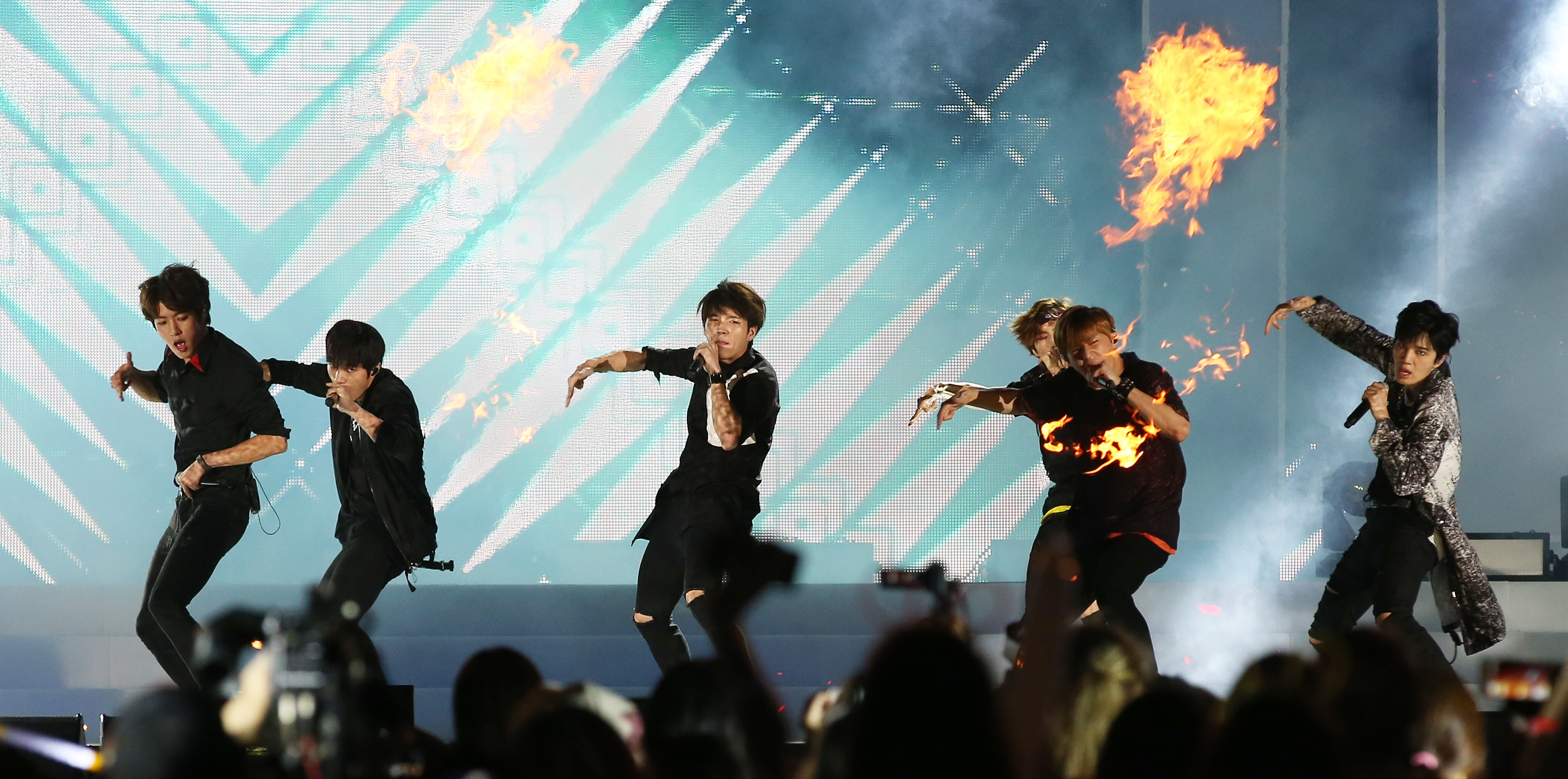
At 2015 summer K-Pop festival

Infinite released Reality, their fifth extended play, on July 13, 2015. It contains seven tracks, with the lead single titled "Bad".

The group announced their second solo world tour 2015 Infinite 2nd World Tour "Infinite Effect" in July 2015. Two concerts were held in Seoul at the Olympic Stadium Arena on August 8 and 9.

Infinite's reality show Infinite Showtime at MBC Every1 started on December 10.

Infinite released their second Japanese album For You on December 16.

=== 2016–2018: Infinite Only, Hoya's departure and Top Seed ===
Infinite concluded the Infinite Effect tour with two concerts titled 2015 Infinite 2nd World Tour "Infinite Effect Advance" in Seoul's Olympic Park Gymnastics Stadium from February 20–21. Infinite held their summer concert 2016 Infinite Concert: That Summer 3 in Seoul Samsung Card Hall's Blue Square from August 3–8. Prior to the concert, they released the special digital single "That Summer (The Second Story)" on July 8. Infinite released their first best Japanese album Best of Infinite on August 31, 2016. Their sixth extended play Infinite Only was released on September 19. It consists of seven tracks with the lead single "The Eye".

Infinite released their third Japanese album Air on May 24, 2017. On June 9, 2017, Woollim Entertainment announced that the members of Infinite were discussing renewing their contracts with the label. On June 28, Korean media reported that only 6 out of 7 members had renewed their contracts. On July 14, member L revealed in an interview that the members were still positively discussing the contract. On August 30, it was announced that Hoya had officially left the group after deciding to not renew his contract with Woollim Entertainment.

The remaining six members continued as a group, releasing their third studio album, Top Seed, in January 2018. The album consists of twelve tracks with the lead single "Tell Me". Despite only having a short two-week promotion, "Tell Me" garnered five music show wins. On May 14, 2018, Sungkyu enlisted for his mandatory military service as an active duty soldier.

=== 2019–2022: Military enlistments and label departures ===
Infinite promoted as five members with release of their single "Clock" on February 13, 2019.

Sungyeol enlisted as an active duty soldier on March 26, 2019, while Dongwoo also enlisted as an active duty soldier on April 15. Sungjong and Woohyun enlisted as public service workers on July 22 and October 24, respectively.

L's exclusive contract with Woollim Entertainment expired on August 18, 2019. He uploaded a handwritten letter the following day onto his Instagram explaining his decision to leave the company "in order to take on new challenges", and that he will continue to be a part of Infinite.

Sungkyu completed his military service on January 8, 2020, and held a small fan meeting following his discharge. On June 9, 2020, Sungkyu and L held a special V Live broadcast together to celebrate Infinite's 10th anniversary. Sungyeol officially completed his military service on October 27, 2020. Dongwoo officially completed his military service on November 15, 2020.

L enlisted into the Republic of Korea Marine Corps on February 22, 2021. Sungkyu left Woollim on March 6, with Dongwoo and Sungyeol also departing Woollim on March 31. Sungjong completed his military service on May 8, and subsequently renewed his contract with Woollim on June 7. Also on June 7, it was confirmed that Sungyeol had signed with Management 2sang, the same agency L is under.

On June 9, Sungkyu, Dongwoo, Sungyeol, and Sungjong gathered on V Live to celebrate Infinite's 11th anniversary. Sungkyu had signed with DoubleH TNE in June 14. The active members of Infinite reunited for a special Youtube variety show in celebration of Chuseok, which was uploaded in September. On October 1, it was announced that Dongwoo had signed with Big Boss Entertainment.

On January 24, 2022, it was announced that Sungjong's contract with Woollim Entertainment expired after he decided not to renew it, becoming a free agent. L was discharged from the military on August 21, thus completing Infinite's military service. On September 5, Sungjong signed an exclusive contract with SPK Entertainment. On October 7, it was announced that Woohyun's contract with Woollim Entertainment had expired after deciding not to renew it, thus becoming the final member of Infinite to leave the agency, although he will still participate in group activities.

=== 2023–present: Infinite Company and comeback ===
On May 8, 2023, it was announced that the group would establish a new agency, Infinite Company, while preparing for activities as a full group. Woollim CEO and the group's founder Lee Jung-yeop transferred the trademark rights of Infinite to Sungkyu without any conditions or fee for his birthday. On July 7, it was announced that the group would have a comeback on July 31, with their seventh EP 13egin. On May 17, 2024 at midnight KST, Infinite released the schedule calendar with all the dates for the teasers they released for their digital single "Flower". According to the teaser chart, Infinite released the first set of concept photos on May 22, continuing until May 31. The group continued to release various teaser content until the single was released on June 9 at 6 PM KST. On their 14th anniversary, Infinite held a YouTube live. Their fan meeting was held from July 13 to 14. On October 8, Infinite announced their 15th anniversary concert tour “Limited Edition”. The tour started on December 6 in Seoul and will end on March 1, 2025 in Hong Kong. On December 8, Infinite announced a March 2025 comeback at the concert. On December 23, the group announced a new digital single, "Sad Loop", which was released on December 25. On February 10, they announced their eighth EP, Like Infinite, which was released on March 6 with lead single "Dangerous". Like Infinite had sold 184,540 copies in Korea making it the groups highest selling EP to date.

On July 6, 2026, they announced the news of the fan meeting titled 'Infinite Gathering V' through their official social media, the fan meetings are scheduled to held in four cities, starting with Incheon Inspire Arena, Incheon on August 29-30, followed by Macau on September 5-6, Taipei on September 19-20, and Tokyo on September 22-23.

== Members ==
=== Current ===
- Kim Sung-kyu (김성규) – leader, vocalist
- Jang Dong-woo (장동우) – rapper
- Nam Woo-hyun (남우현) – vocalist
- Lee Sung-yeol (이성열) – vocalist
- L (엘) – vocalist
- Lee Sung-jong (이성종) – vocalist

=== Former ===
- Hoya (호야) – rapper, vocalist

== Sub-units ==
- Infinite H – Hoya (former member), Dongwoo
- Infinite F – Lee Sungyeol, L, Lee Sungjong

== Discography ==
=== Korean albums ===
- Over the Top (2011)
- Season 2 (2014)
- Top Seed (2018)

=== Japanese albums ===
- Koi ni Ochiru Toki (2013)
- For You (2015)
- Air (2017)

== Tours ==
=== Headlining ===
World tours

- One Great Step (2013)
- Infinite Effect (2015)
- Comeback Again (2023)
- 15th Anniversary Concert - Limited Edition (2024 - 2025)

15th Anniversary Concert - Limited Edition (2024 - 2025)
| Date | City | Country | Venue |
|---|---|---|---|
| December 6, 2024 | Seoul | South Korea | KSPO Dome |
| December 7, 2024 | Seoul | South Korea | KSPO Dome |
| December 8, 2024 | Seoul | South Korea | KSPO Dome |
| December 21, 2024 | Taipei | Taiwan | NTSU Arena |
| December 22, 2024 | Taipei | Taiwan | NTSU Arena |
| January 11, 2025 | Macau | China | Studio City Event Center |
| January 12, 2025 | Macau | China | Studio City Event Center |
| January 18, 2025 | Jakarta | Indonesia | Tennis Indoor Stadium Senayan |
| February 7, 2025 | Singapore | | The Star Theater |
| February 15, 2025 | Yokohama | Japan | PIA Arena MM |
| February 16, 2025 | Yokohama | Japan | PIA Arena MM |
| February 22, 2025 | Kuala Lumpur | Malaysia | Mega Star Arena |
| March 1, 2025 | Hong Kong | China | AXA x WONDERLAND |

== Filmography ==
=== Film ===
- Infinite Concert: Second Invasion Evolution the Movie 3D (2012)
- Grow: Infinite's Real Youth Life (2014)
- Infinite 15th Anniversary Concert Limited Edition The Movie (2025)

=== Television series ===
- Wara Store (2011)

=== Television shows ===
- You're My Oppa (2010)
- Japan Days Of Infinite (2010)
- Sesame Player (2011)
- Birth Of A Family (2012)
- Ranking King (2012)
- Infinite Busan Wish Travel (2012)
- 10 Days In Japan Story (2013)
- This Is Infinite (2014)
- Infinite's Showtime (2015–2016)

== Notes ==
Awards and achievements
| Preceded by f(x) | Korean Music Awards: Group Musician of the Year; 2012 | Succeeded by Incumbent |
