= Be Mine (Infinite song) =

2011 song by the South Korean boy band Infinite

Song by Infinite

from the album Over the Top
- Released: July 21, 2011
- Recorded: 2011
- Genre: K-pop, dance-pop
- Length: 3:25
- Label: Woollim Entertainment
- Songwriter: Song Sooyoon
- Producers: Han Jaeho, Kim Seungsoo

Music video
- "Be Mine" on YouTube "Be Mine (Dance ver.)" on YouTube

"Be Mine" (내꺼하자 Naekkeohaja) is a song released by the South Korean boy band Infinite. The song is the title track of the group's first studio album Over the Top, released on July 21, 2011. The song is also the second Japanese single of the group. It was released on April 18, 2012 in 4 different editions.

== Composition ==
The song was written by Song Sooyoon and produced by Han Jaeho and Kim Seungsoo (also known as Sweetune), which also produced songs for the groups Kara, f(x), Rainbow, SS501, Nine Muses and more. A remix version of the song was released on the studio album Paradise, a repackaged version of the album Over the Top.

== Promotions ==
The group started promoting the track on July 23, 2011 on the MBC's Show! Music Core and they also promoted in the music shows M! Countdown, Music Bank and Inkigayo. The songs "1/3" and "Amazing", from the album Over the Top, were used for the special comeback week performances. The first music show award for the song (and also the first award for the group since their debut in 2010) was on September 1, on the show M! Countdown, and they won another award on the following week. On September 2, the group promoted the title song in a remix version until September 11. The promotions of the song ended on September 18.

== Music video ==
A teaser of the music video was released on July 15 and the full video on July 20, on the Woollim Entertainment's YouTube channel. A dance version of the video was released on July 31. The group label, Woollim Entertainment, revealed a practice video of the group performing the song on August 11.

== Track listing ==
1. "내꺼하자" (Be Mine) – 3:25

== Chart performance ==
The song debuted at the number 24 in Gaon's singles chart on the week of July 23 and climbed to the position 13 on the following week and stayed for two weeks. It climbed one position on the week of September 13, which is the peak of the song.

=== Charts ===
Chart (2011)	Peak position
South Korea Gaon Weekly singles	12
South Korea Gaon Monthly singles	12
South Korea Gaon Yearly singles	74
South Korea Billboard Korea K-Pop Hot 100	12

== Japanese version ==
"Be Mine"
- Regular edition with theme Solid

Single by Infinite

from the album Koi ni Ochiru Toki
- B-side: "Julia (Japanese version)"
- Released: April 18, 2012
- Recorded: 2011–2012
- Genre: J-pop, dance-pop
- Length: 3:27
- Label: Woollim Contents
- Songwriter: Song Sooyoon

Infinite Japanese singles chronology
"BTD (Before the Dawn)" (2011)	"Be Mine" (2012)	"She's Back" (2011)

Music video
- "Be Mine (Japanese version)" on YouTube

A Japanese version of the song served as the group's second single in Japan. It was released on April 18, 2012 in 4 different editions: CD+DVD (with theme 'Solid'), 2 limited CD with different packages and booklets (Type B with theme 'Pop art' and Type C with theme 'Innocent') and a Regular edition (also with theme 'Solid').

=== Composition ===
All songs from the single were previously released in Korean on the album Over the Top.

=== Music video ===
The music video of the song premiered on March 19, on MTV Japan. Different of the Korean music video, this version doesn't have a storyline and has more solo and choreographed shots.

=== Track listing ===
All lyrics are written by Song Sooyoon; all music is composed by Han Jaeho and Kim Seungsoo.

All editions track listing
No.	Title	Length
1.	"Over the Top"	0:51
2.	"Be Mine" (Japanese version)	3:27
3.	"Julia" (Japanese version)	3:30
Total length:		7:47

DVD (limited type A – CD+DVD version)
No.	Title	Length
1.	"Be Mine" (music video – Japanese version)
2.	"Be Mine" (Music video – Korean Dance version)
3.	"Be Mine" (music video – Korean version)
4.	"Infinite Japan Story"

=== Charts ===
==== Oricon chart ====
Released	Oricon Chart	Peak	Debut sales	Sales total	Chart run
April 18, 2012	Daily Singles Chart	2	28,192	57,073	8 weeks
April 18, 2012	Weekly Singles Chart	2	50,473	57,073	8 weeks
April 18, 2012	Monthly Singles Chart	8	54,218	57,073	8 weeks

==== Other charts ====
Chart	Peak position
Billboard Japan Hot 100	3
Billboard Japan Hot Singles Sales	2

== Release history ==
Release dates and formats for "Be Mine"
Region	Date	Format	Label
South Korea	July 21, 2011	Promotional single	Woollim Entertainment
Japan	April 18, 2012	CD single, Digital download	Woollim Entertainment
