= First Invasion =

EP by Infinite
- Released: June 9, 2010
- Recorded: 2010
- Genre: K-pop
- Length: 16:36
- Label: Woollim Entertainment
- Producer: Han Jae-ho

Infinite chronology
First Invasion (2010)	Evolution (2011)

Singles from First Invasion
- 1. "Come Back Again" Released: June 9, 2010; 2. "She's Back" Released: August 4, 2010

First Invasion is the debut EP by South Korean boy band Infinite. It was released on June 9, 2010. They promoted the main single of the EP "Come Back Again" and followed with "She's Back".

== Track listing ==
No.	Title	Lyrics	Music	Length
1.	"Infinite" (typeset as ∞)		J.Yoon	0:49
2.	"다시 돌아와" (Come Back Again)	Kim Bumin	Hitchhiker (Jinu)	3:06
3.	"She's Back"	Song Sooyoon, Han Jaeho, Kim Seungsoo, Mithra Jin	Han Jaeho, Kim Seungsoo	3:14
4.	"날개" (Wings)	Tablo, Mithra Jin	J.Yoon	3:11
5.	"붙박이 별" (Fixed Star)	Song Sooyoon	Go Namsoo	3:26
6.	"맡겨" (Entrust)	Song Sooyoon, Han Jaeho, Kim Seungsoo, Mithra Jin	Lee Joohyung	3:15
Total length:				16:36

== Charts ==
Chart (2010)	Peak position
Gaon Album Chart (weekly)	10

== Sales and certifications ==
Physical sales

Album	Chart	Period Covered	Amount
First Invasion	Physical Album Chart (Gaon)	2010	5,500
First Invasion	Physical Album Chart (Gaon)	2011	16,785
First Invasion	Physical Album Chart (Gaon)	2012	16,781
First Invasion	Physical Album Chart (Gaon)	2013	9,045
First Invasion	Physical Album Chart (Gaon)	2014	3,308
First Invasion	Physical Album Chart (Gaon)	2015	1,697
Total (As of Date)			53,116
