= Inspirit =

Single album by Infinite
- Released: March 17, 2011
- Recorded: 2011
- Genre: K-pop
- Length: 9:44
- Language: Korean
- Label: Woollim

Infinite chronology
Evolution (2011)	Inspirit (2011)	Over the Top (2011)

Singles from Inspirit
- 1. "Nothing's Over" Released: March 17, 2011

Inspirit is the first single album of South Korean boy band Infinite. The album was released on March 17, 2011, along with the music video for the album's lead single "Nothing's Over". Infinite followed up the promotions of "Nothing's Over" with a broadcasting version of their song "Can U Smile (Remake)".

== Track listing ==
Digital CD
No.	Title	Lyrics	Music	Arrangement	Length
1.	"Nothing's Over"	Song Sooyoon	Han Jaeho, Kim Seungsoo	Han Jaeho, Kim Seungsoo, Hong Seunghyun	3:18
2.	"Shot"	Song Sooyoon, Kim Ina	Han Jaeho, Kim Seungsoo	Han Jaeho, Kim Seungsoo, Hong Seunghyun	3:09
3.	"Can U Smile" (Remake)	Song Sooyoon	Han Jaeho, Kim Seungsoo	Ahn Joonsung	3:11
Total length:					9:37

- The song "Can U Smile (Remake)" is a new version of the song with the same title, originally released on their previous EP Evolution.

== Chart ==
Chart (2011)	Peak position
South Korean Albums (Gaon)	3

== Sales ==
Physical sales
Album	Chart	Period Covered	Amount
Inspirit	South Korea Physical Album Chart (Gaon)	2011	30,143
Inspirit	South Korea Physical Album Chart (Gaon)	2012	18,165
Inspirit	South Korea Physical Album Chart (Gaon)	2013	13,055
Inspirit	South Korea Physical Album Chart (Gaon)	2014	4,062
Inspirit	South Korea Physical Album Chart (Gaon)	2015	1,786
Inspirit	South Korea Physical Album Chart (Gaon)	2016	673
Total (As of Date)			67,884
