= Season 2 (album) =

Studio album by Infinite
- Released: May 21, 2014
- Recorded: 2014
- Studio: Woolim Studios
- Genres: K-pop; dance-pop; Rock; R&B
- Length: 44:30; 52:14 (repackaged)
- Language: Korean
- Labels: Woollim; SM C&C; LOEN

Infinite chronology
Destiny (2013)	Season 2 (2014)	Reality (2015)

Singles from Season 2
- 1. "Last Romeo" Released: May 21, 2014; 2. "Back" Released: July 22, 2014

Season 2 is the second Korean studio album (third overall) by the South Korean boy band Infinite. It was released on May 21, 2014 by Woollim Label. The album features thirteen tracks with "Last Romeo" serving as the title track. A repackage of the album titled Be Back, was released on July 22, 2014.

== Background ==
A concept image for the group's comeback single "Last Romeo" was revealed on May 12, 2014, with Woollim Entertainment confirming later in an interview with Newsen that they would be making their comeback on May 21.

== Track listing ==
No.	Title	Lyrics	Music	Length
1.	"Season 2"		Yue	1:03
2.	"Last Romeo"	Song Soo Yoon, Dongwoo, Hoya	Han Jae Ho, Kim Seung Soo	3:16
3.	"Follow Me"	Jae Lee Yoon	Jae Lee Yoon	3:27
4.	"Rocinante" (로시난테; Rosinante)	Song Soo Yoon	Lee Chang Hyeon, Han Jae Ho, Kim Sung Soo	3:09
5.	"Breathe" (숨 좀 쉬자; Soom Jom Swija)	Song Soo Yoon	G-High, Lee Ju Hyeon	3:32
6.	"Light (Sunggyu solo)"	Sungkyu	Jae Lee Yoon	3:37
7.	"Alone (Infinite H)"	Rphabet, Dongwoo, Hoya	Rphabet	3:30
8.	"Memories"	Song Soo Yoon	Han Jae Ho, Kim Sung Soo, Yue	3:39
9.	"A Person Like Me" (나란 사람; Naran Saram)	Jae Lee Yoon	Jae Lee Yoon	3:53
10.	"Reflex"	Song Soo Yoon	Han Jae Ho, Kim Sung Soo, Go Nam Soo	3:16
11.	"Crazy (Infinite F)" (미치겠어; Michigesseo)	Conan (Rocoberry)	Conan (Rocoberry)	3:51
12.	"Close My Eyes (Woohyun solo)" (눈을 감으면; Nuneul Gameumyeon)	Woohyun	Woohyun	5:04
13.	"I Need U Back" (소나기; Sonagi)	Iggy, Youngbae, Ang Lee	Iggy, Youngbae, Ang Lee	3:13
Total length:				44:30

=== Repackaged edition (Be Back) ===
No.	Title	Lyrics	Music	Length
1.	"Season 2"		Yue	1:03
2.	"Last Romeo"	Song Soo Yoon, Dongwoo, Hoya	Han Jae Ho, Kim Seung Soo	3:16
3.	"Back"	Rphabet	Rphabet	3:53
4.	"Diamond"	Yi Gi, Jang Won Gyu, Mengi	Yi Gi, Jang Won Gyu, Mengi	3:51
5.	"Follow Me"	Jae Lee Yoon	Jae Lee Yoon	3:27
6.	"Rocinante" (로시난테; Rosinante)	Song Soo Yoon	Lee Chang Hyeon, Han Jae Ho, Kim Sung Soo	3:09
7.	"Breathe" (숨 좀 쉬자; Soom Jom Swija)	Song Soo Yoon	G-High, Lee Ju Hyeon	3:32
8.	"Light (Sunggyu solo)"	Sungkyu	J.Yoon	3:37
9.	"Alone (Infinite H)"	Rphabet, Dongwoo, Hoya	Rphabet	3:30
10.	"Memories"	Song Soo Yoon	Han Jae Ho, Kim Sung Soo, Yue	3:39
11.	"A Person Like Me" (나란 사람; Naran Saram)	Jae Lee Yoon	Jae Lee Yoon	3:53
12.	"Reflex"	Song Soo Yoon	Han Jae Ho, Kim Sung Soo, Go Nam Soo	3:16
13.	"Crazy (Infinite F)" (미치겠어; Michigesseo)	Conan (Rocoberry)	Conan (Rocoberry)	3:51
14.	"Close My Eyes (Woohyun solo)" (눈을 감으면; Nuneul Gameumyeon)	Woohyun	Woohyun	5:04
15.	"I Need U Back" (소나기; Sonagi)	Iggy, Youngbae, Ang Lee	Iggy, Youngbae, Ang Lee	3:13
Total length:				52:14

== Charts ==
=== Weekly charts ===
Chart	Peak position
Season 2
South Korea Weekly Album Chart (Gaon)	1
US World Albums (Billboard)	7
Be Back
South Korea Weekly Album Chart (Gaon)	1

=== Monthly charts ===
Chart	Peak position
Season 2
South Korea Monthly Album Chart (Gaon)	3
Be Back
South Korea Monthly Album Chart (Gaon)	2

=== Yearly charts ===
Chart	Peak position
Season 2
South Korea Yearly Album Chart (Gaon)	6
Be Back
South Korea Yearly Album Chart (Gaon)	17

== Release history ==
Region	Format	Date	Label
South Korea	CD, digital download	May 21, 2014; July 22, 2014 (repackaged)	SM C&C; Woollim Label; LOEN Entertainment
Various	Digital download	May 21, 2014; July 22, 2014 (repackaged)	SM C&C; Woollim Label; LOEN Entertainment
