= New Challenge =

EP by Infinite
- Released: March 21, 2013
- Recorded: 2012–2013
- Genre: K-pop
- Length: 22:11
- Language: Korean
- Label: Woollim Entertainment
- Producer: Sweetune

Infinite chronology
Infinitize (2012)	New Challenge (2013)	Destiny (2013)

Singles from New Challenge
- 1. "Man in Love (남자가 사랑할 때)" Released: March 21, 2013; 2. "Still I Miss You (그리움이 닿는 곳에)" Released: April 25, 2013

New Challenge is the fourth extended play by South Korean boy band Infinite. It was released on March 21, 2013, with the song "Man in Love (남자가 사랑할 때)" being used as promotional track.

== Release ==
During Infinite's 2013 Infinite Rally fan meeting on March 1, 2013, the group announced that they have finished recording their upcoming album and the release was impending. The title of album's promotional track, "Man in Love", was revealed on March 17, 2013. The EP and music video for "Man in Love" were simultaneously released at 12:00 pm KST. New Challenge was physically released on March 25, 2013.

== Composition ==
Like their previous releases, the group teamed up with production duo Sweetune to produce the EP.

The title track, "Man in Love", as well as the tracks "As Good As It Gets", and the group's cover of leader Sunggyu's solo song, "60 Seconds" was written by Song Sooyoon and composed by Han Jaeho and Kim Seungsoo. "Beautiful" was written and composed by member Woohyun, with arrangements made by Yue, while "Inconvenient Truth" was written by Song Sooyoon and composed by Lee Changhyun.

== Promotion ==
The TV promotions for the song "Man in Love" started on March 21, 2013, on Mnet's show M! Countdown, the same day as the album's release. Infinite is as well promoting the song on other music broadcast shows. The song "Still I Miss You" was performed alongside "Man in Love" during the "comeback week" of promotions and on their goodbye stages. They also performed a special stage in Music Bank with the remade version of Sunggyu's "60 seconds"

The album's main track "Man in Love" has won seven (7) music show awards during the entire promotion. It received 1st place for two consecutive weeks in SBS' Inkigayo, (March 31 and April 7) and KBS Music Bank (April 5 and 12). The song has as well ranked on top spot on MBC Music's Show Champion (April 3) and on Mnet's M! Countdown (April 4). The group has achieved an all-kill with their first place wins on all music broadcast shows during their third week of promotion. On April 20, MBC has introduced a brand new ranking system for Music Core and hailed Infinite as the winner of that week's chart and the first receiver of the revived ranking award. The achievement also makes them the first idol to receive first place wins in all public music shows airing in Korean major broadcasting stations for the past 12 years.

== Track listing ==
Official track listing
No.	Title	Lyrics	Music	Arrangement	Length
1.	"Welcome to Our Dream" (Intro)		Ahn Junsung	Ahn Junsung	1:09
2.	"Man in Love" (남자가 사랑할때)	Song Sooyoon	Han Jaeho, Lee Changhyun, Kim Seungsoo	Han Jaeho, Lee Changhyun, Kim Seungsoo, Hong Seunghyun	3:15
3.	"이보다 좋을 순 없다." (As Good As It Gets)	Song Sooyoon	Han Jaeho, Lee Changhyun, Kim Seungsoo	Han Jaeho, Lee Changhyun, Kim Seungsoo, Hong Seunghyun	3:35
4.	"그리움이 닿는 곳에" (Still I Miss You)	Hwang Hyun	Hwang Hyun	Hwang Hyun	3:50
5.	"Beautiful"	Nam Woohyun	Nam Woohyun	Yue	3:27
6.	"60초 (Infinite version)" (60 seconds)	Song Sooyoon	Yue, Han Jaeho, Kim Seungsoo	Yue, Han Jaeho, Kim Seungsoo, Hong Seunghyun	3:34
7.	"불편한 진실" (An Inconvenient Truth)	Song Sooyoon	Lee Changhyun	Lee Changhyun	3:20
Total length:					22:11

== Chart performance ==
As soon as their physical albums hit the shelves on the March 25, it quickly rose to first place on the Hanteo chart. The album also managed to rank at the top spot for two weeks in a row and recorded over 5 times the amount of physical albums sold as the 2nd placer. The warm reception for the new album is also evident as their previous albums also managed to re-enter the charts.

Similar result can also be found in GAON Weekly Albums chart where it remained to be on top spot for two consecutive weeks. Moreover, with barely 13 days, the number of physical sales amounting to 138,000+ is enough to make it as the best selling album for the month of March. Aside from that, the album also achieved recognition in Oricon Imported Albums Chart where it ranked first for two consecutive weeks.

=== Charts ===
Chart	Peak position
Gaon Weekly album chart	1
Gaon Weekly domestic album chart	1
Gaon Monthly album chart	1
Gaon First-Half of the Year chart	6
Gaon Yearly album chart	12
Oricon Imported Albums Chart	1

== Release history ==
Country	Date	Format	Label
South Korea	March 21, 2013	Digital download	Woollim Entertainment; LOEN Entertainment
South Korea	March 25, 2013	CD	Woollim Entertainment; LOEN Entertainment
