= Evolution (Infinite EP) =

EP by Infinite
- Released: January 6, 2011
- Recorded: 2010
- Genre: K-pop; dance-pop
- Length: 17:39
- Label: Woollim Entertainment
- Producer: Han Jae Ho and Kim Seung Su

Infinite chronology
First Invasion (2010)	Evolution (2011)	Inspirit (2011)

Singles from Evolution
- 1. "Voice of My Heart" Released: December 29, 2010; 2. "BTD (Before the Dawn)" Released: January 6, 2011

"Evolution" is the second EP by the South Korean boy band Infinite. The song "BTD (Before the Dawn)" was used to promote the EP. They released the song "Voice of My Heart" on December 29, 2010, as a teaser, and the full EP was released a week after, on January 6, 2011.

== Controversy ==
During the promotions of the title track "BTD (Before the Dawn)", the music video of the song was considered to be controversial as it depicted violence.

== Track listing ==
No.	Title	Lyrics	Music	Arrangement	Length
1.	"Evolution" (Intro)		J.Yoon	J.Yoon	1:00
2.	"BTD (Before the Dawn)"	Song Sooyoon	Han Jaeho, Kim Seungsoo, Ahn Joonsung		3:03
3.	"Can U Smile"	Song Sooyoon	Han Jaeho, Kim Seungsoo		3:14
4.	"Hysterie"	Song Sooyoon	G-High, Lee Joohyung		3:00
5.	"마음으로.." (Voice of My Heart)	J.Yoon	J.Yoon		4:28
6.	"몰라" (I Don't Know)	Song Sooyoon	Yue		2:58
Total length:					17:39

== Charts ==
Chart (2011)	Peak position
Gaon Album Chart (weekly)	3
Gaon Album Chart (year-end)	53

== Sales and certifications ==
Physical Sales

Album	Chart	Period Covered	Amount
Evolution	South Korea Physical Album Chart (Gaon)	2011	28,320
Evolution	South Korea Physical Album Chart (Gaon)	2012	20,913
Evolution	South Korea Physical Album Chart (Gaon)	2013	11,642
Evolution	South Korea Physical Album Chart (Gaon)	2014	3,722
Evolution	South Korea Physical Album Chart (Gaon)	2015	1,974
Total (As of Date)			66,571+
