= Over the Top (Infinite album) =

Studio album by Infinite
- Released: July 21, 2011
- Recorded: 2011
- Genre: K-pop; dance-pop; Electronic; pop rock
- Length: 34:12; 38:38 (with hidden track); 44:24 (Repackage)
- Language: Korean
- Label: Woollim Entertainment

Infinite chronology
Inspirit (2011)	Over the Top (2011)	Infinitize (2012)

Singles from Over the Top
- 1. "Be Mine" Released: July 21, 2011

Alternative cover
- Paradise cover

Singles from Paradise
- 1. "Paradise" Released: September 26, 2011

Over the Top is the first studio album of South Korean boy band Infinite. It was released on July 21, 2011. The song "Be Mine" was used to promote the album. A repackaged version of the album was released on September 26, 2011 with the song "Paradise" as the lead single.

== Composition ==
Several songs on the album and the singles "Be Mine" and "Paradise" were produced by Han Jaeho and Kim Seungsoo and written by Song Sooyoon, who are also known for producing songs for Kara, f(x), Rainbow, SS501, Nine Muses and more.

== Promotions ==
=== "Be Mine" ===
The group started promoting the track "Be Mine" on July 23, 2011 on MBC's Show! Music Core and continued to promote on shows like M! Countdown, Music Bank, and Inkigayo. The songs "1/3" and "Amazing" were used for Infinite's special comeback week performances. Infinite won their first music show award for "Be Mine" (and also the first award for the group since their debut in 2010) on September 1, 2011, on M! Countdown, and won another award the following week. The group promoted the track in a remix version from September 2–11. Promotions for the song ended on September 18.

=== "Paradise" ===
Promotions for "Paradise" started on September 29, on Mnet's M! Countdown. It was also promoted on Music Bank, Music Core and Inkigayo. "Paradise" won a mutizen award on October 9 on Inkigayo and won another award on October 13 on M! Countdown. "Paradise" promotions ended on November 5.

== Track listing ==
Digital
No.	Title	Lyrics	Music	Arranged by	Length
1.	"Over the Top" (Intro)		J.Yoon	J.Yoon	0:51
2.	"내꺼하자" (Be Mine)	Song Sooyoon	Han Jaeho, Kim Seungsoo	Han Jaeho, Kim Seungsoo, Hong Seunghyun	3:25
3.	"3 분의 1" (1/3)	Song Sooyoon	Han Jaeho, Kim Seungsoo	Han Jaeho, Kim Seungsoo, Hong Seunghyun	3:22
4.	"Tic Toc"	Kim Ina	J.Yoon	J.Yoon	3:32
5.	"Julia"	Song Sooyoon	Han Jaeho, Kim Seungsoo	Han Jaeho, Kim Seungsoo, Hong Seunghyun	3:29
6.	"Because" (SungGyu solo)	JH	JH	JH	3:52
7.	"시간아" (Time; WooHyun solo)	J.Yoon	J.Yoon	J.Yoon	4:29
8.	"Amazing"	Song Sooyoon	Lee Joohyung	Lee Joohyung	3:26
9.	"Crying" (DongWoo/Hoya ft Baby Soul)	Pe2ny, J-sus, Musikacase	Pe2ny, J-sus, Musikacase	Pe2ny, J-sus, Musikacase	4:04
10.	"Real Story"	Song Sooyoon	Go Namsoo, Han Boram	Go Namsoo, Han Boram	3:48
Total length:					34:12

Physical CD and iTunes version
No.	Title	Lyrics	Music	Arranged by	Length
10.	"Real Story"	Song Sooyoon	Go Namsoo, Han Boram	Go Namsoo, Han Boram	8:07
Total length:					38:38

Repackage album (Paradise)
No.	Title	Lyrics	Music	Length
3.	"Paradise"	Song Sooyoon	Yue, Han Jaeho, Kim Seungsoo	3:35
4.	"Cover Girl"	Song Sooyoon	Han Jaeho, Kim Seungsoo	3:16
13.	"내꺼하자 (Remix)" (Be Mine Remix)	Song Sooyoon	Han Jaeho, Kim Seungsoo	3:22
Total length:				44:24

Paradise – Physical version
No.	Title	Length
14.	"hidden track"	1:19
Total length:		46:53

Notes

- On the iTunes Store version and physical version of Over the Top, the song "Real Story" has a hidden track that starts at 6:48.
- The physical version of "Paradise" has another hidden track on track 14. It is the same included in Over the Top but with a conversation between the members in the beginning. This hidden track was later released as a full song on the group's third mini album Infinitize, with the title "In The Summer".

== Charts ==
=== Over the Top ===
Chart	Peak position
Gaon Weekly album chart	2
Gaon Monthly album chart	2
Gaon Yearly album chart	23

=== Paradise ===
Chart	Peak position
Gaon Weekly album chart	1
Gaon Monthly album chart	3
Gaon Yearly album chart	25

== Sales and certifications ==
Physical sales

Album	Chart	Period covered	Amount
Over the Top	Gaon Physical Album Chart	2011	57,125
Total (As of date)			57,125

Album	Chart	Period covered	Amount
Paradise	Gaon Physical Album Chart	2011	61,794
Paradise	Gaon Physical Album Chart	2012	40,181
Paradise	Gaon Physical Album Chart	2013	20,843
Paradise	Gaon Physical Album Chart	2014	4,354
Total (As of Date)			127,172

== Release history ==
Country	Date	Format	Label
South Korea	July 21, 2011	CD, digital download	Woollim Entertainment
Various	July 21, 2011	Digital download	Woollim Entertainment
South Korea	September 26, 2011 (Repackage)	CD, digital download	Woollim Entertainment
