= BTD (Before the Dawn) =

Song by Infinite

Promotional single by Infinite

from the album Evolution
- Released: January 6, 2011
- Recorded: 2010
- Genre: K-pop, Dance-pop
- Length: 3:03
- Label: Woollim Entertainment
- Songwriters: Song Sooyoon, Han Jaeho, Kim Seungsoo, Ahn Joonsung

Music video
- "BTD (Before the Dawn)" on YouTube "BTD (Before the Dawn)" (Dance ver.) on YouTube

"BTD (Before the Dawn)" is a song released by the South Korean boy band Infinite. The song is the second track of the group's second EP Evolution, released on January 6, 2011. A Japanese version of the song served as their debut single in Japan. It was released on November 19, 2011 in 3 different editions.

== Promotions ==
Promotions for the song began on January 7, 2011 on KBS's show Music Bank and as well as on MBC's Music Core, SBS's Inkigayo and Mnet's M! Countdown. The song "Hysterie" was also used for the group's comeback performances. Promotions for "BTD" ended on February 27.

== Music video ==
The teaser for the music video was released on December 29, 2010 and the full video was released on January 6, 2011, along with the EP. Before the release of the music video, the teaser had some controversy because of its suggestive violent content. After the release of the full video, it was given a +19 rating due to being too violent for minors. The group's agency, Woollim Entertainment, stated that its intention was to visualize the inner conflict of the characters in the video, and not to display gratuitous violence. Infinite released a dance version of the music video on January 17.

== Track listing ==
Japanese "TSUTAYA" rental single:

1. "BTD (Before the Dawn)" – 3:03
2. "BTD (Before the Dawn)" (Music video)

== Charts ==
Chart	Peak position
Gaon Chart	45

== Japanese version ==
"BTD (Before the Dawn) (Japanese version)"
- Regular edition cover

Single by Infinite

from the album Koi ni Ochiru Toki
- B-side: "Can U Smile (Remake)"
- Released: November 19, 2011
- Recorded: 2011
- Genre: J-pop, Dance-pop
- Length: 3:05
- Label: Cultura Publications
- Songwriters: Song Sooyoon, Han Jaeho, Kim Seungsoo, Ahn Joonsung

Infinite Japanese singles chronology
"BTD (Before the Dawn) (Japanese version)" (2011)	"Be Mine" (2012)

A Japanese version of the song was chosen as the group's debut single in Japan. It was released on November 19, 2011 in 2 limited editions (CD+Photobook and CD+DVD) and CD only regular edition.

=== Composition ===
"BTD (Before the Dawn)" is a Japanese version of the song originally recorded in Korean. The B-side "Can U Smile (Remake)" is a ballad version of the song "Can U Smile", previously released on the EP Evolution.

=== Music video ===
The music video of the song is the same as the Korean version. It was released on November 16 on MTV Japan.

=== Track listing ===
Japanese single
No.	Title	Length
1.	"BTD (Before the Dawn)" (Japanese version)	3:04
2.	"Can U Smile" (Remake)	3:10
3.	"BTD (Before the Dawn)" (Korean version)	3:04
4.	"BTD (Before the Dawn)" (Instrumental)	3:03
Total length:		12:21

DVD (Type B - CD+DVD version)
No.	Title	Length
1.	"BTD (Before the Dawn) & She's Back" (Live from 1st Japan Showcase + Offshots)
2.	"BTD (Before the Dawn)" (Music video - Japanese version)
3.	"BTD (Before the Dawn)" (Music video - Dance version)
4.	"BTD (Before the Dawn)" (Music video - Behind the Scenes #1: Woohyun vs L)
5.	"BTD (Before the Dawn)" (Music video - Behind the Scenes #2: Dance & Lip)

=== Oricon chart ===
Released	Oricon Chart	Peak	Debut Sales	Sales Total	Chart Run
November 19, 2011	Daily Singles Chart	2	15,281 (Daily); 26,333 (Weekly); 36,763 (Monthly)	39,261+	13 weeks
November 19, 2011	Weekly Singles Chart	7	15,281 (Daily); 26,333 (Weekly); 36,763 (Monthly)	39,261+	13 weeks
November 19, 2011	Monthly Singles Chart	22	15,281 (Daily); 26,333 (Weekly); 36,763 (Monthly)	39,261+	13 weeks
November 19, 2011	Yearly Singles Chart	193	15,281 (Daily); 26,333 (Weekly); 36,763 (Monthly)	39,261+	13 weeks

==== Other Charts ====
Chart	Peak position
Billboard Japan Hot 100	20
Billboard Japan Hot Singles Sales	6

== Release history ==
Release dates and formats for "BTD (Before the Dawn)"
Country	Date	Format	Version	Label
South Korea	January 6, 2011	Promotional single, Digital download	Korean	Woollim Entertainment
Japan	March 16, 2011	Rental single	Korean	Woollim Entertainment
Japan	November 19, 2011	CD single, Digital download	Japanese	Cultura Publications
