= Mr.Mr (band) =

South Korean boyband

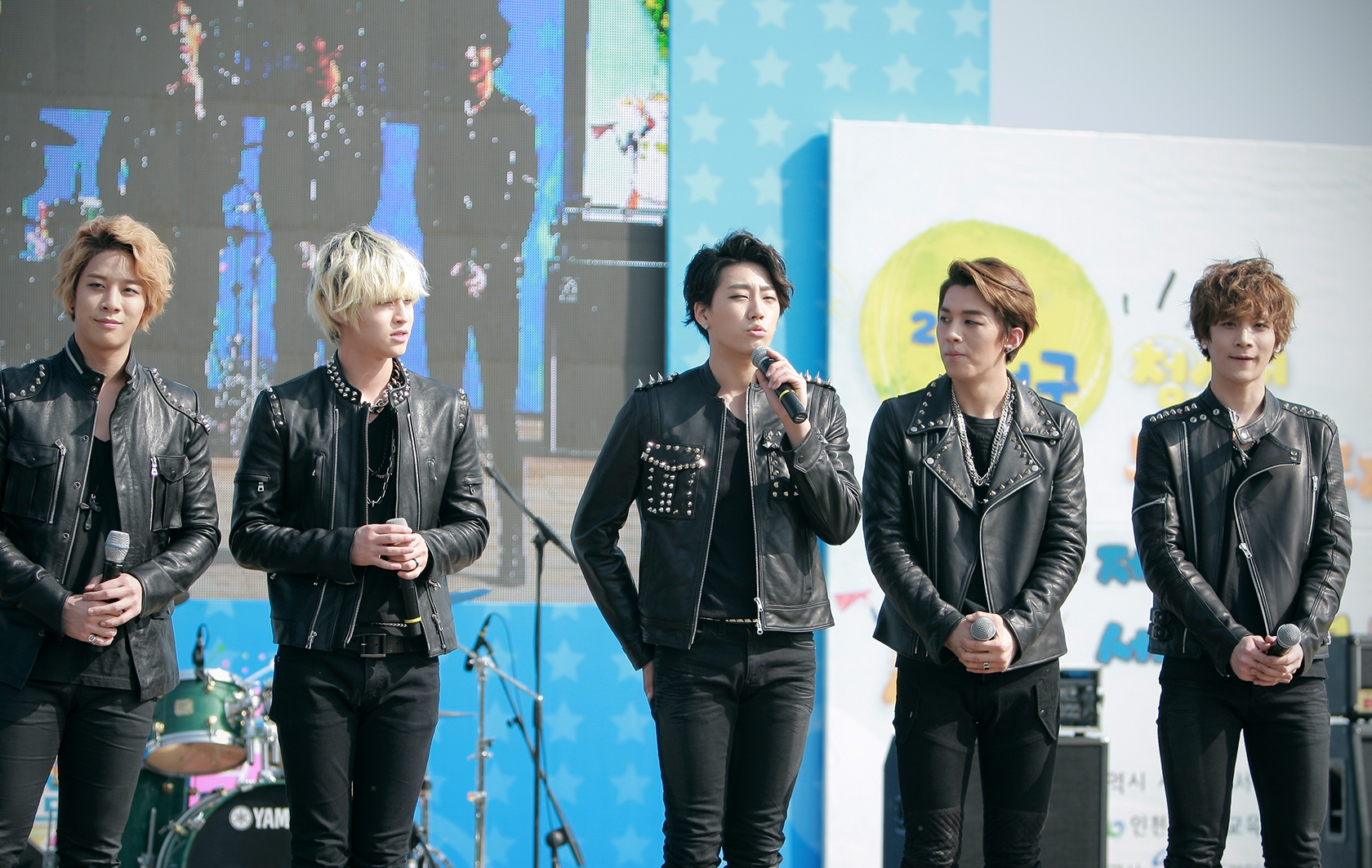
- Mr.Mr in May 2013. (L–R) Changjae, Ryu, Jin, Tey and Doyeon.

Background information
- Origin: South Korea
- Genres: K-pop; Dance
- Years active: 2012–2021
- Past members: Doyeon; Changjae; Tey; Sanghyun; Jaemin; Hon; Jin; Jiwon; Ryu

Mr.Mr (Korean: 미스터미스터; stylized MR.MR) was a South Korean boy band that debuted on October 14, 2012. The group had achieved only minor success in South Korea and had been active in Japan since 2015. The group's last formation consisted of members Doyeon, Changjae, Tey, Sanghyun and Jaemin. The group took part in the KBS competition series The Unit in 2017 and disbanded in 2021. They released their debut single "Who's That Girl" on October 4, 2012.

== History ==
=== 2012–2013 : Debut with "Who's That Girl" and new member ===
The group released their digital single and music video for 'Who's That Girl' on October 4, 2012 and started promotion on October 5 on music program Music Bank. A few days on October 12 the dance practice video for 'Who's That Girl' was released.

On January 20, 2013 on the official YouTube page a teaser was released for the group's second single 'Highway'. The single and music video for the song was released on the 24th. "Highway" is produced by Brian Kierulf & Joshua Michael Schwartz, the same producers who created the group’s debut track "Who’s That Girl". They started their comeback promotions on M! Countdown the same day.

On June 25 the group updated their official fan cafe with a teaser photo. In addition to photos of the members, the teaser announced that Mr.Mr will pre-release its title song on July 5 followed by first mini-album release on the 8th. On June 30 the first teaser for the group title song 'Waiting For You' was released. The music video was released on the 4th of July, 2013 the mini album for their first mini album was released on the 5th.

On November 8, 2013, it was announced that new member, Hon, would be joining the group as the sixth member. A music video teaser for Hon was released on their official YouTube account revealing that the group will be making a comeback with their 3rd digital single on November 8, 2013. On November 5, 2013 the album jacket photos of each members along with a group photo were released. On November 6, the second teaser for their comeback was released for their third single 'Do You Feel Me' the song and music video were released on 8 November 2013 they starting comeback promotion of the single the following day on music program Music Bank.

On December 7, 2013 the group released their first episode of their reality show 'MMTV'.

=== 2014 : Mr.Mr., It's You, and Big Man ===
Despite Hon's controversy, the group released a self-titled single on February 28, 2014.

The group released their newest single 'It's You' on April 25. The song is dedicated to all fans who stuck together with them. The music video for this song was released on May 7. It was announced the group would be making their return with a new single Big Man by releasing both a group photo and a teaser for the music video. The music video for the single was released on May 16 also the single release. They started promotions for this song on Show! Music Core on May 17.

On June 17, it was confirmed that member Changjae would be starring the idol-turned-actors drama High School: Love On alongside Infinite members Nam Woo-hyun and Sungyeol with child actress Kim Sae-ron. His agency stated "Changjae completed his first filming last week. He has been consistently practicing acting and is working hard. He plans to continue with his acting career. Please look forward to him."

=== 2015 : Ryu's lawsuit and leaving the group and comeback in April with new members ===
On March 4, the agency released a statement regarding Ryu leaving the group in a fan cafe without stating the reason for his leave. A few days later, Ryu himself saw the statement and was deeply shocked by it. He has taken to Twitter to address certain complaints including his unfair treatment, physical and verbal abuse which he had received while still being in the group. Since then, both parties have been exchanging responses and Ryu has officially filed a lawsuit against his agency's CEO. Following his leave, MR.MR will continue on as a four-member group. Ryu is the third member to leave the group as of 2015. Following the controversy of Ryu‘s leave from the group, MR.MR announced their comeback plans for April with two new members join them, Sanghyun and Jaemin.

=== 2016-2021 : Jin's absence, The Unit, and Disbandment ===
Following Japanese promotions for Just 1 Light in February 2016, Jin became absent from promotions for their next release ROCK THIS WØRLD in August of that same year, and GOOD TO BE BAD in November, though no formal reason or statement has been given for his departure. On September 4, 2017, it was announced that MR.MR would be taking part in idol reboot show The Unit, a competition series on KBS that "aims to shine a spotlight on artists who have already debuted but failed to find mainstream success". The show will create two 10-member unit groups, male and female, with the final groups promoting for seven months. "The Unit" will begin airing in late October.

On "Showterview with Jessie" it was confirmed by member Doyeon that Mr.Mr had disbanded and he was currently working as a manager for Hong Seok-cheon.

== Controversy ==
=== Hon's scandal ===
It was reported that a transgender woman, A, had written a Facebook post maligning male idol, B, for casting her aside after taking advantage of her resources. She had revealed that the idol in question had joined an already existing idol group back in November, which led to widespread speculations about his possible identity. One of these guesses included Mr.Mr's Hon, which led the group's agency Winning Insight to release their official stance on February 17. The agency wrote:

"Transgender A's writing has nothing to do with Mr.Mr's Hon. These claims are groundless. After checking for confirmation, we found out that A and Mr.Mr's Hon were friends that counseled each other about their concerns even before A became a transgender. There was a time they helped each other out financially, but they are not more than friends.

Contrary to A's assertions, the claims they were more than friends, they were living together, she introduced him to a host bar for work, and she filmed their sexual intercourse are all false. Resulting from the controversial writing, Hon is having a hard time because of the shock and hurt he received from a friend whom he had trusted. They are preparing to sue A for defamation." Hon will now be leaving the group, as stated in his letter due to the controversy.

It was revealed that the transgender woman has lied about the controversy, 'A' issued her official apology regarding all of this. She said in an exclusive interview with Sports Korea on February 18, "The words I wrote are all untrue. Firstly, in relation to causing this, I am sorry towards Hon and the people around him. I did not know that the words I wrote when I was feeling down and in a drunken state would become such a huge problem as this. There are definitely no such things as videos."

It turned out that she and Hon had been friends even before she had undergone surgery. However, while Hon was preparing to debut as a singer, he had stopped contacting her, which made her sad and resulted in her writing these untrue claims after having a few drinks.

She said, "I was frustrated that Hon did not contact me and grew more distant after becoming a singer. Since we communicated so well, we were friends who would give each other a lot of advice about our problems and lean on each other. I think that is why I was even sadder after Hon debuted as a singer. The content in my writing was based on an acquaintance's situation; I only wrote it as if it were my personal situation because I had drunk alcohol."

Lastly, A said, "After this incident happened, I had a phone conversation with Hon. I was grateful that Hon did not hold me responsible nor did he rebuke me, which made me feel even more apologetic. No matter the circumstances, I acknowledge that I caused this huge situation and made a mistake. In addition, I am greatly reflecting on this so I hope I will not be sued. Hon told me he was talking with his agency, but I hope with all my heart for favourable arrangements."

Due to this Hon left the group after this controversy, he wrote "I'm sorry because I think I worried and disappointed a lot of people. A, who wrote the controversial post, and I were friends since a long time ago. But I wanted to say for certain that things in the post such as that I worked at a host bar, had financial troubles, had a video, and dated A are not true."

He added, "After A wrote the post drunk, she checked it again a few hours later and said that she thought she made a mistake. Since she wrote it in a personal space, I didn't think there would be any problems. I told her not to think about it, and hung up. I don't want to sue an old friend. If the writings are true, I'd be embarrassed, but I didn't live my life like that. But it's true that MR.MR's image was hurt by this. So I decided to leave MR.MR."

The label reported saying "Our label and the MR.MR members have decided to follow Hon's decision. We will not stop our support and encouragement so Hon can start anew. We're sincerely sorry for worrying our fans, and please support Hon and MR.MR members after this difficult decision."

=== Dissing SM Entertainment ===
When Mr.Mr. came back with the self-titled single, it also bore the same name as Girls' Generation's comeback EP Mr.Mr. which was released four days before. This raised suspicions by fans whether or not the boy group were mocking the girl group. Regarding this connection to Girls' Generation, a rep of Mr.Mr told that Asia Economy that the rumours were true. Mr.Mr's new single included lyrics such as: "How could you do that when I'm right here? / Girl, you come out so easily from behind the curtain / Not me, but another mistake, Mr.Mr / I bet you're amused by my embarrassment," and, "I become faint for a main like you / Am I loser and are you a winner? / We're going the same path / I must have looked small from your high perch / Is that why you did that to me?"

The group's agency WinningIn Sight CEO, released an official position on the group's diss song towards Girls' Generation's title track name on March 5. They mentioned the controversial diss's rumours were true. They also mentioned that the diss was directed towards Girls' Generation's company SM Entertainment.

== Members ==
=== Past members ===
- Doyeon (도연)
- Changjae (창재)
- Tey (태이)
- Sanghyun (상현)
- Jaemin (재민)
- Jin (진)
- Jiwon (지원)
- Hon (혼)
- Ryu (류)

== Discography ==
=== Extended plays ===
Title	Album details	Peak chart positions	Sales
Title	Album details	KOR	Sales
Korean
Waiting For You	Released: July 5, 2013; Label: Winning Insight M; Formats: CD, digital download	9	KOR: 2,208+
Out	Released: April 24, 2015; Label: E-HO Entertainment; Formats: CD, digital download	14	KOR: 1,576+

=== Singles ===
Title	Year	Peak chart positions		Sales	Album
Title	Year	KOR	JPN	Sales	Album
Korean
"Who's That Girl?"	2012	—	—	—N/a	Non-album single
"Highway"	2013	—	—	—N/a	Non-album single
"Waiting For You"	2013	—	—	—N/a	Waiting For You
"Do You Feel Me"	2013	—	—	—N/a	Non-album single
"MR.MR"	2014	—	—	—N/a	Non-album single
"It's You"	2014	—	—	KOR: 14,061+	Non-album single
"Big Man"	2014	—	—	—N/a	Out
"Out"	2015	—	—	—N/a	Out
"Destiny" (인연)(緣)	2018	—	—	—N/a	Non-album single
Japanese
"Do You Feel Me" (Japanese version)	2015	—	71	—N/a	Non-album singles
"Big Man"/"She Is So Beautiful"	2015	—	24	—N/a	Non-album singles
"Just 1 Light"	2016	—	5	—N/a	Non-album singles
"ROCK THIS WØRLD"	2016	—	20	—N/a	Non-album singles
"Good To Be Bad"/"Everything"	2016	—	14	—N/a	Non-album singles
"Kizuna"	2018	—	21	JPN: 4,374	Non-album singles
"—" denotes single did not chart or was not released in that region.
