= A New Journey (EP) =

EP by Nam Woo-hyun
- Released: May 7, 2019
- Recorded: 2019
- Studio: Woollim Studio (Seoul)
- Genre: Dance
- Length: 22:09
- Language: Korean
- Label: Woollim
- Producer: Lee Joong-yup (exec.)

Nam Woo-hyun chronology
Second Write.. (2018)	A New Journey (2019)	With (2021)

Singles from A New Journey
- 1. "Hold on Me" Released: May 7, 2019

A New Journey is the third mini-album by South Korean singer Nam Woo-hyun of idol group Infinite. It was released on May 7, 2019, by Woollim Entertainment and distributed by Kakao M. Having released two ballad mini-albums since 2016, Nam sought to expand his musical palette and facilitate his growth as a musician. He ultimately crafted a dance record with his stories embedded in the lyrics.

After a series of photo and video teasers, A New Journey and its lead single "Hold on Me" featuring rapper Junoflo were concurrently released. Nam held a showcase for the mini-album and promoted the song by performing on music chart programs across various television networks. A New Journey peaked at number two on South Korea's national Gaon Album Chart, shifting over 42,000 units domestically since its release.

== Background ==
"The new album is about my new journey. Everyone thinks it's ballads when Nam Woo-hyun does it, but I tried new music. Besides ballads, I wanted to show that I do well with other music, too."

— Nam on A New Journey

Nam crafted A New Journey amid preparations to play the lead roles in the musicals The Days and Mefisto, and in midst of a concert tour throughout Asia. On previous singles "Still I Remember" (Write.., 2016) and "If Only You Are Fine" (Second Write.., 2018), he was noted as the "representative performer of emotional ballads". The title reflects Nam's new musical direction. He sought to showcase musical maturity and explore diverse genres throughout the album tracks. In wanting the lyrics, thoughts, and melodies he identified with to "melt deeply" into the record, Nam prioritized his storytelling. The record was set to be released earlier, but was delayed to "enhance its completeness". The album was recorded in Seoul at Woollim Studio and mixed at W Sound, LAFX, InGrid Studio, and Mapps Studio. It was mastered at 821 Sound Mastering. Unlike his previous solo endeavors, Nam implemented choreography in his songs. He prepared by modifying his diet, doing weight training, exercising, and managing his health.

== Music structure ==
A dance album, A New Journey integrates EDM and funk into its sound. Nam wrote the lyrics to four tracks and contributed to two of the compositions. He penned songs based on his experiences over the past ten years. The record opens with "Intro", an "upbeat" track without lyrics which "gives the impression of leaving somewhere for the first time". Nam described as "essential to setting the tone" of the album. It is followed by "Hold on Me", a dance-pop song with elements of house music that incorporates acoustic and electric guitar into the track. Nam described it as a "sharp" song with a "strong accent". Rapper Junoflo features on the song. A fan of his work on the rap competition series Show Me the Money and his music, Nam reached out to him for a collaboration. While on tour in the United States, Junoflo traveled to South Korea to work on the song. A portion of his rap was done in English due to his comfort with the language. "Rain" was composed by MC the Max member J. Yoon and the lyrics deal with "overcoming pain and hardships". Nam's "wide" vocal range oscillates throughout the dance track, evoking a "dreamy" ambience. He stated that "emotions become moisturized" and "old memories often occur" as a result of rain; the "slightly damp smell" of precipitation led him to conceive the song lyrics.

"Stranger" is a dance-pop song with an emphasis on guitar riffs and bass. Nam described the song as a mixture of urban music and funk, and he stated that it was a candidate as the lead single for A New Journey. The track's melody was crafted and completed during a nine-hour session with HSND, Adrian Mckinnon, and Galaxy. On "Crying Baby", Nam employs his lyrical voice and a "classy sound" with an undercurrent of synthpop. The song serves as an encouraging message to "lonely people under the weight of life". After listening to the demo, he utilized a vocal technique for the track to fit his style. In "Just Look at Me", the narrator tells his girlfriend to "look at me, as I promise to look at you forever". It is described as a "sexy and warm" song. The closing track "Flower" is a medium-tempo confession song on guitar and piano. In the lyrics, he conveys his gratitude and love for his fans, likening them to sunflowers.

== Release and promotion ==
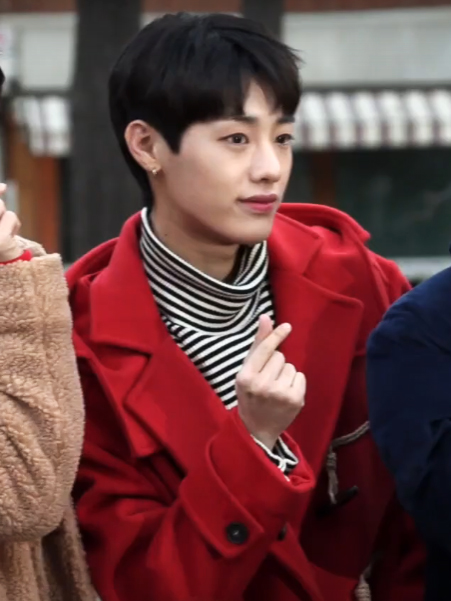
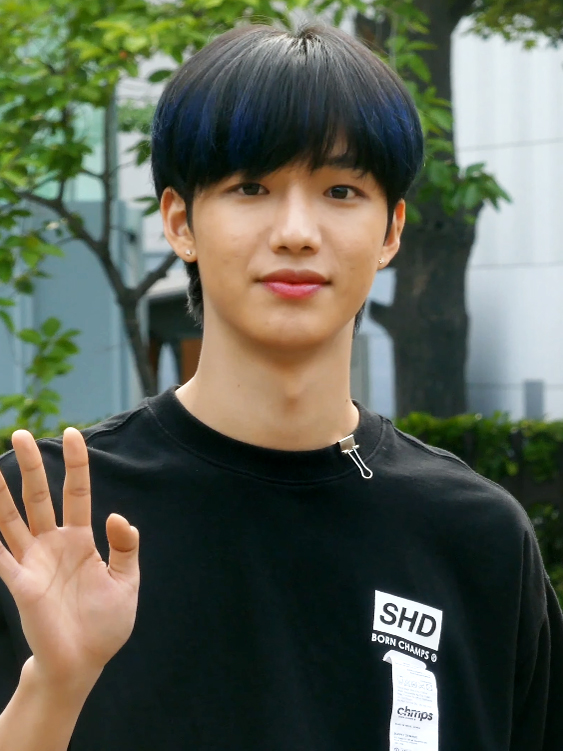
Tag of Golden Child (left) and Lim Young-min of AB6IX (right) rapped during live performances in Junoflo's absence

Woollim Entertainment announced A New Journey and shared an image teaser via social media on April 29, 2019. It showcased a "mellow" Nam standing on a bridge late at night. A second picture was posted on May 1, presenting Nam in a red-lit setting and "dreamlike" atmosphere. A short version music video teaser for the lead single "Hold on Me" was published the following day. On May 4, a longer version music video teaser was unveiled. An album preview of the mini-album was shared on the subsequent day. A New Journey and the music video for "Hold on Me" were simultaneously released on May 7. Hosted by MC Haru, Nam held a showcase for the mini-album at Ilji Art Hall in the Cheongdam-dong ward of Seoul.

Nam began promoting "Hold on Me" on weekly music chart shows two days later. Due to Junoflo's commitments abroad, Tag of idol group Golden Child performed in his place alongside Nam during the promotion cycle. In addition to the lead single, Nam also performed "Rain" on Mnet's M Countdown, KBS2's Music Bank, Munhwa Broadcasting Corporation's (MBC) Show! Music Core, Seoul Broadcasting System's (SBS) Inkigayo, SBS MTV's The Show, and MBC Music's Show Champion. The final music show performance of "Hold on Me" was done with Lim Young-min of AB6IX, and promotions were completed on May 22. Nam made an appearance on EBS FM's radio program Midnight Black hosted by DJ and bandmate Sungjong. He also appeared on MBC Standard FM's Idol Radio, where he performed "Hold on Me" and a medley of Infinite songs.

== Commercial performance ==
On the chart dated May 5 – 11, 2019, A New Journey debuted at number two on South Korea's national Gaon Album Chart. According to album sales aggregator Hanteo Chart, the mini-album sold 18,488 copies in its first week. It became the 55th best-selling album in the first half of the year, shifting 42,656 units domestically. The single "Hold on Me" under-performed on music charts. It debuted and peaked at number 69 on the Gaon Download Chart.

== Critical reception ==
A New Journey received favorable reviews from all four critics from TV Daily. Kim Ji-ha felt the "care" put into the songwriting, while Kim Han-kil considered Nam's "sexy" voice "memorable". Kim Ye-na complimented the "fresh" musical take, as Oh Ji-won considered the music as "refined" and noted "even the stand-out featuring".

== Track listing ==
A New Journey
No.	Title	Lyrics	Music	Arrangement	Length
1.	"A New Journey"		Code 9	Code 9	1:18
2.	"Hold on Me" (featuring Junoflo)	Nam Woo-hyun, Junoflo	Code 9	Code 9	3:12
3.	"Rain"	Nam Woo-hyun	J. Yoon	J. Yoon	3:23
4.	"Stranger"	Nam Woo-hyun	Nam Woo-hyun, HSND, Han Gang, Shin Jae-yeong, Jo Michelle, Adrian Mckinnon, Galaxy	HSND, Han Gang, Shin Jae-yeong	3:14
5.	"Crying Baby"	The Need, twlv	The Need, twlv	The Need, twlv	3:14
6.	"Just Look at Me" (넌 나만 바라봐; Neon Naman Barabwa)	vvonne	Davink	Davink	4:41
7.	"Flower"	Nam Woo-hyun	Nam Woo-hyun, Jerry.L	Jung Gu-hyeon	3:07
Total length:					22:09

== Credits ==
Credits adapted from the mini-album's liner notes.

- AngryBird – drums, synthesizer
- Baek Ji-ho – drums, synth programming
- Chae Min-bi – design and art
- Choi In-seong – bass
- Code 9 – arranger, composer
- Davink – arranger, bass, chorus, composer, mixing engineer, piano, programming and editing, synthesizer
- Do-a – artist makeup
- Alan Foster – mixing engineer
- Galaxy – composer
- Han Gang – arranger, composer, drums, synthesizer
- HSND – arranger, composer
- Hwang Jeong-mi – chorus
- Hwang Su-ji – design and art
- J. Yoon – arranger, composer
- Jerry.L – composer
- Jeok Jae – drums, guitar
- Jeon Hyeong-ki – electric guitars
- Jin Su-jeong – video contents
- Jo Jun-seong – mixing engineer
- Jo Yeong-seon – design and art
- Jo Michelle – composer
- Ju Chan-yang – stylist
- Jung Eun-hye – stylist
- Jung Eun-kyeong – mixing engineer
- Jung Gu-hyeon – arranger, chorus, guitar, piano
- Jung Yu-ra – digital editing
- Junoflo – lyricist
- Kim Dong-min – choreographer
- Kim Ho-gon – video contents
- Kim Ji-eun – video contents
- Kim Ji-hong – creative director
- Kim Mi-ri – video contents
- Kim Seok-min – mixing engineer
- Kim Su-nam – stylist
- Kwon Nam-woo – mastering engineer
- Lee Hye-won – stylist
- Lee Joong-yup executive producer, producer
- Lee Su-min – chorus
- Adrian McKinnon – chorus, composer
- Nam Woo-hyun – composer, lyricist
- The Need – arranger, composer, lyricist, mixing engineer, synthesizer
- Onesta – drums, synthesizer
- Park Jeong-min – recording engineer
- Park Seong-je – photographer
- Rakiss – drums, percussion, synthesizer
- Shin Jae-yeong – arranger, composer
- Shin Seok-cheol – drums
- Su-a – artist hair
- twlv – arranger, chorus, composer, lyricist
- vidalowkey – mixing engineer
- vvonne – lyricist
- Yu Ho-yeol – piano
- Zaydro – chorus, drums, guitar, synth programming

== Chart ==
Chart (2019)	Peak position
South Korean Albums (Gaon)	2
