= Infinite F =

South Korean boy band

- Origin: Seoul, South Korea
- Genres: K-pop; J-pop; dance
- Years active: 2014–2019
- Labels: Woollim Entertainment
- Spinoff of: Infinite
- Members: Sungyeol; L; Sungjong
- Website: ifnt7.com

Infinite F (Korean: 인피니트F; stylized as INFINITE F) is the second sub-group of South Korean boy band Infinite formed by Woollim Entertainment in 2014. The sub-group consists of Infinite vocalists: Sungyeol, L and Sungjong. The sub-group made their simultaneous Japanese and Korean debuts with the single albums Koi no Sign and Azure.

== History ==
=== 2011–2014: Formation and debut ===
Infinite F first performed as an unofficial unit at Infinite's 1st Inspirit Inauguration on August 17. The trio did a cover of Orange Caramel's "Bangkok City" which was well received by fans.

Infinite F was officially announced at the One Great Step Returns encore concert, held February 28 and March 1. They also performed the song "Heartthrob" for the first time. The song was eventually revealed to be the main OST for the KBS drama Hi! School-Love On, starring group member Sungyeol and Infinite fellow member Woohyun.

The unit would have their first official release on Infinite's second Korean studio album, Season 2. The song "Going Crazy" was composed by Konan of indie Korean rock group Rocoberry.

On October 14, Woollim Entertainment officially announced that Infinite F will be debuting in Japan with Koi no Sign on November 19. Akiko Higashimura, creator of Princess Jellyfish, provided illustrations for the album jacket. Koi no Sign debuted on the Oricon Weekly Chart at #6, selling 31,287 copies. The album was later released in Korean version titled Love Sign.

As part of Japanese promotions, a pop-up store was set up in Harajuku from November 17 to 30, selling various Infinite F goods and clothing items. In addition, the sub-group did a five-show showcase tour, performing in Osaka, Nagoya and Tokyo.

On November 5, the album cover for Azure was revealed, closely followed by the announcement that Infinite F would be debuting in Korea the following week. Azure and its music video for "Heartthrob" was released on December 2. The sub-group made their official music show debut on Music Bank on December 5. On December 12, Infinite F became the first Infinite sub-group or solo to be nominated for first place on a music show.

== Discography ==
=== Single albums ===
Title	Album details	Peak chart positions		Sales
Title	Album details	KOR Gaon	JPN Oricon	Sales
Korean
Azure	Released: December 2, 2014; Label: Woollim Entertainment, LOEN Entertainment; Formats: CD, digital download; Track listing: 1. Heartthrob; 2. It's You; 3. My Girl	1	—	KOR: 52,914+
Japanese
Koi No Sign	Released: November 19, 2014; Label: Delicious Deli Records, Woollim Contents; Formats: CD, digital download; Track listing: 1. Koi No Sign; 2. Kimi Ga Sukidayo; 3. My Girl	—	6	JPN: 32,866+
"—" denotes releases that did not chart or were not released in that region.

=== Singles ===
Title	Year	Peak chart positions			Sales	Album
Title	Year	KOR Gaon	JPN Oricon	JPN Billboard	Sales	Album
Korean
"Heartthrob"	2014	23	—	—	KOR: 69, 815+	Azure
Japanese
"Koi No Sign"	2014	—	6	11	JPN: 31,287+	Koi No Sign
"—" denotes releases that did not chart or were not released in that region.

=== Other charted songs ===
Title	Year	Peak chart positions		Sales	Album
Title	Year	KOR Gaon	JPN Oricon	Sales	Album
"It's You"	2014	64	—	KOR: 18, 215+	Azure
"My Girl"	2014	67	—	KOR: 17, 460+	Azure
"—" denotes releases that did not chart or were not released in that region.
