= Toheart (band) =

South Korean duo

Toheart 투하트
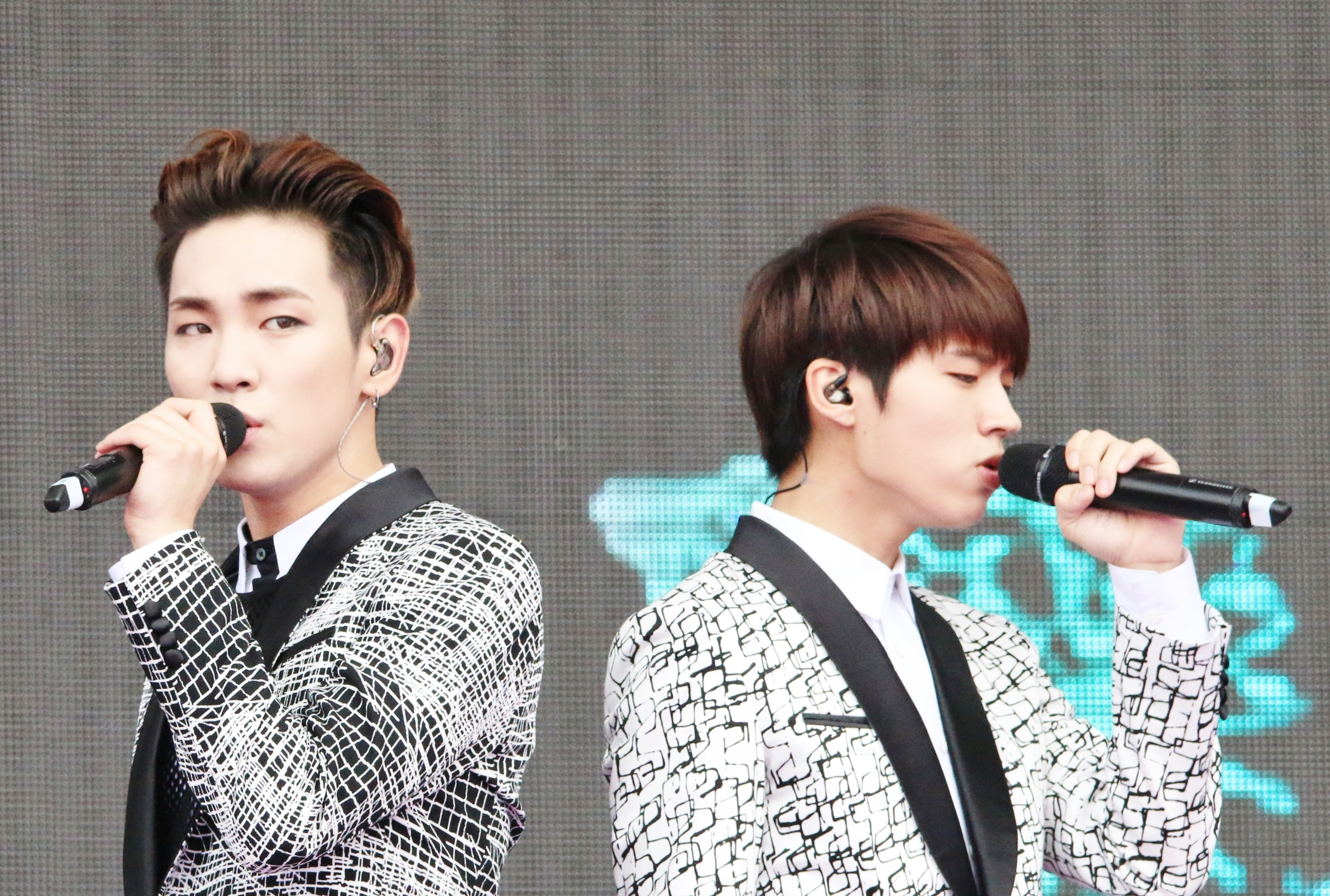
- Toheart at the Hong Kong Dome Festival in 2014

Background information
- Origin: Seoul, South Korea
- Genres: K-pop; Synthpop
- Years active: 2014
- Labels: SM; Woollim
- Members: Woohyun; Key
- Website: 2heartproject.com

Toheart (Korean: 투하트, commonly stylized as ToHeart) was a South Korean duo formed by Woohyun from Infinite and Key from Shinee in 2014. It was a collaboration between SM Entertainment and Woollim Entertainment.

== History ==
"At first, we were going to go with names like "Woohyun and Key" or "Key and Woohyun", but it felt like a once in a lifetime thing. We made another name to represent that we'll continue to work as a team in the future and put out good music."

— Member Woohyun discussing the group's name.

On February 20, 2014 S.M. Entertainment released a teaser announcing Toheart, a special unit duo consisting of Woohyun of Infinite and Key of Shinee. The release was followed by a second prologue teaser which was released on February 27. After the release of a music video teaser on March 4, 2014 and a track preview video a few days later, Toheart debuted with the mini album Delicious and the music video for the title track was released on March 10. On the same day, the duo held their first showcase in the Coex Artium, hosted by bandmates Minho and Sungkyu. Jeff Benjamin from Billboard praised the duo's vocals, and also the choreography and on-screen charisma.

Both Woohyun and Key stated that it was their idea to create this unit, since both are friends and they had interest in working with each other. They didn't expect to do a singing collaboration project, instead thinking of photoshoots and similar. On April 7, 2014, the duo followed up their promotions with "Tell Me Why" featuring Woohyun's bandmate Sungyeol’s younger brother, Golden Child Daeyeol as well as actress Mun Ka-young. The song was requested most by fans and was produced by Sweetune. It tells the story about a man’s unwillingness to let a lover go.

== Discography ==
=== Extended plays ===
List of extended plays, with selected details, chart positions and sales
Title	Details	Peak chart positions				Sales
Title	Details	KOR	JPN	TW	US World	Sales
1st Mini Album	Released: March 10, 2014; Label: SM, Woolim, LOEN; Format: CD, Digital download	1	25	11	8	KOR: 74,242; JPN: 6,216

=== Singles ===
List of singles, with selected chart positions, showing year released, sales and album name
Title	Year	Peak chart positions		Sales	Album
Title	Year	KOR	KOR Hot	Sales	Album
"Delicious"	2014	9	17	KOR: 193,347	1st Mini Album
"Tell Me Why"	2014	23	—	KOR: 114,751	1st Mini Album
"—" denotes releases that did not chart or were not released in that region.

=== Other charted songs ===
List of other charted songs, with selected chart positions, showing year released, sales and album name
Title	Year	Peak chart positions	Sales	Album
Title	Year	KOR	Sales	Album
"You're My Lady"	2014	34	KOR: 37,217	1st Mini Album
"Maze" (미로 (迷路))	2014	50	KOR: 26,948	1st Mini Album
"Departure" (출발)	2014	51	KOR: 26,679	1st Mini Album
"Intro"	2014	82	KOR: 15,315	1st Mini Album

== Music videos ==
Music video	Year
"Delicious"	2014
"Delicious (Performance Version)"	2014
"Tell Me Why"	2014

== Awards and nominations ==
=== SBS MTV Best of the Best ===
Year	Nominee / work	Award	Result
2014	"Delicious"	Best Male MV	Nominated

=== Golden Disk Awards ===
Year	Nominee / work	Award	Result
2015	Toheart	Popularity Award	Won
