= Kim Young-jae =

- Hangul: 김영재
- RR: Gim Yeongjae
- MR: Kim Yŏngjae

Kim Young-jae or Kim Yeong-jae is a Korean name and may refer to:

- Kim Yong-jae (born 1952), North Korean politician
- Kim Young-jae (actor, born 1975), South Korean actor
- Kim Young-jae (actor, born 1995), South Korean actor
