= Seongjong =

Seongjong (성종; from Chinese: 成宗(Chéngzōng)) is the temple name of two Korean monarchs:

- King Seongjong of Goryeo (r. 981–997)
- King Seongjong of Joseon (r. 1469–1494)

== See also ==
- Chengzong (disambiguation), the Chinese romanization
- Lee Seong-jong, South Korean boy band Infinite member
