= Chengzong =

Chengzong (成宗(Chéngzōng)) is a Chinese temple name. It may refer to:

- Qian Hongzuo (928–947), King Zhongxian of Wuyue
- Temür Khan (1265–1307), Emperor Chengzong of Yuan
- Dorgon (1612–1650), prince regent of the Qing dynasty, once posthumously honoured as Emperor Chengzong of Qing

== See also ==
- Seongjong (disambiguation), the equivalent Korean name
