= With (EP) =

EP by Nam Woo-hyun
- Released: October 19, 2021
- Genre: R&B; pop
- Length: 19:20
- Language: Korean
- Label: Woollim

Nam Woo-hyun chronology
A New Journey (2019)	With (2021)

Singles from With
- 1. "Calm & Passion" Released: October 19, 2021

With is the fourth mini-album by South Korean singer Nam Woo-hyun. It was released on October 19, 2021, by Woollim Entertainment and distributed by Kakao Entertainment. After releasing his previous record A New Journey (2019) and completing his Arbor Day 2 concerts, Nam enlisted in mandatory military service that October. He completed his duties and was discharged in August 2021. He held two concerts entitled Ontact Concert: Arbor Day On shortly after his return, where he announced his forthcoming project.

Regretting some of his music from previous works, Nam crafted an R&B and pop mini-album. Following a series of photo and video teasers, With and the lead single "Calm & Passion" were simultaneously released. Nam promoted the song by performing it on music chart programs across various television networks. The mini-album peaked at number eleven on South Korea's national Gaon Album Chart and has sold over 25,000 copies since its release.

== Background and recording ==
On October 24, 2019, Nam became the fifth member of Infinite to enlist in mandatory military service. Due to an injury he had sustained, he worked in public service to fulfill his obligations. He was discharged from his duties on August 4, 2021. During his deployment, Nam gained weight and peaked at about 82 kg (181 lb). Ahead of the album release, he dieted and exercised for three hours a day and lost 20 kg (44 lb) in four months. During preparations, he struggled to learn the choreography for the lead single, citing military responsibilities as impediments of his ability to rehearse dancing during his tenure. From October 2–3, he held two online productions entitled Nam Woo-hyun Ontact Concert: Arbor Day On, his first performances since Arbor Day 2 in August 2019. During the second show, the release of his forthcoming album was announced before the encore stage.

While recording songs for With, Nam listened to his previous solo albums and expressed remorse over "a few things". He decided to make music that would not bring him regret in the future, stating: "As a singer of popular music, I wanted to make this album with my own color and strong points... This album leaves out my weaknesses and maximizes my strengths." Upon hearing the demo of "Calm & Passion", Nam was reluctant to record it because it was a "very good song", which put him under pressure. After making modifications to the track and penning a portion of its lyrics, he felt that it matched him well. "My Diary" was composed with a free and flowing ternary form. Nam utilized his falsetto in its chorus. Nam was inspired by teen dramas to conceive "A Song for You". While making the track, he wanted to make a song that would allow him to romp around on stage. Nam influenced the hairstyle and fashion that was presented for the album photos. He decided to dye his hair red because "it would go well" with the lead single's concept.

== Music structure ==
Nam classifies With as an R&B record. Tamar Herman of South China Morning Post labeled it "mid-tempo contemporary pop". The mini-album opens with its eponymous intro, a jazzy number that begins with lyrical guitar melodies and progresses into an escalation of brass sounds. It is followed by "Calm & Passion", a dreamy R&B-pop song that integrates a heavy bassline with a succinct and sentimental beat. Its lyrics convey "intense love" and the resulting deep thoughts through a concealed and composed demeanor. Nam described it as an "exciting" dance-pop song that "contains a man's calm and passion". "My Diary" conveys the expectation and wait for the arrival of a person to love. A medium pop track, "Lonely Night" comprises an emotional melody and lyrics. Nam expresses feelings of loneliness and love. Conceptually a noir piece, "Alone" is a cinematic synth-pop track. The mini-album closes with "A Song for You", a tropical house song which produces a "warm and refreshing sensation".

== Release and promotion ==
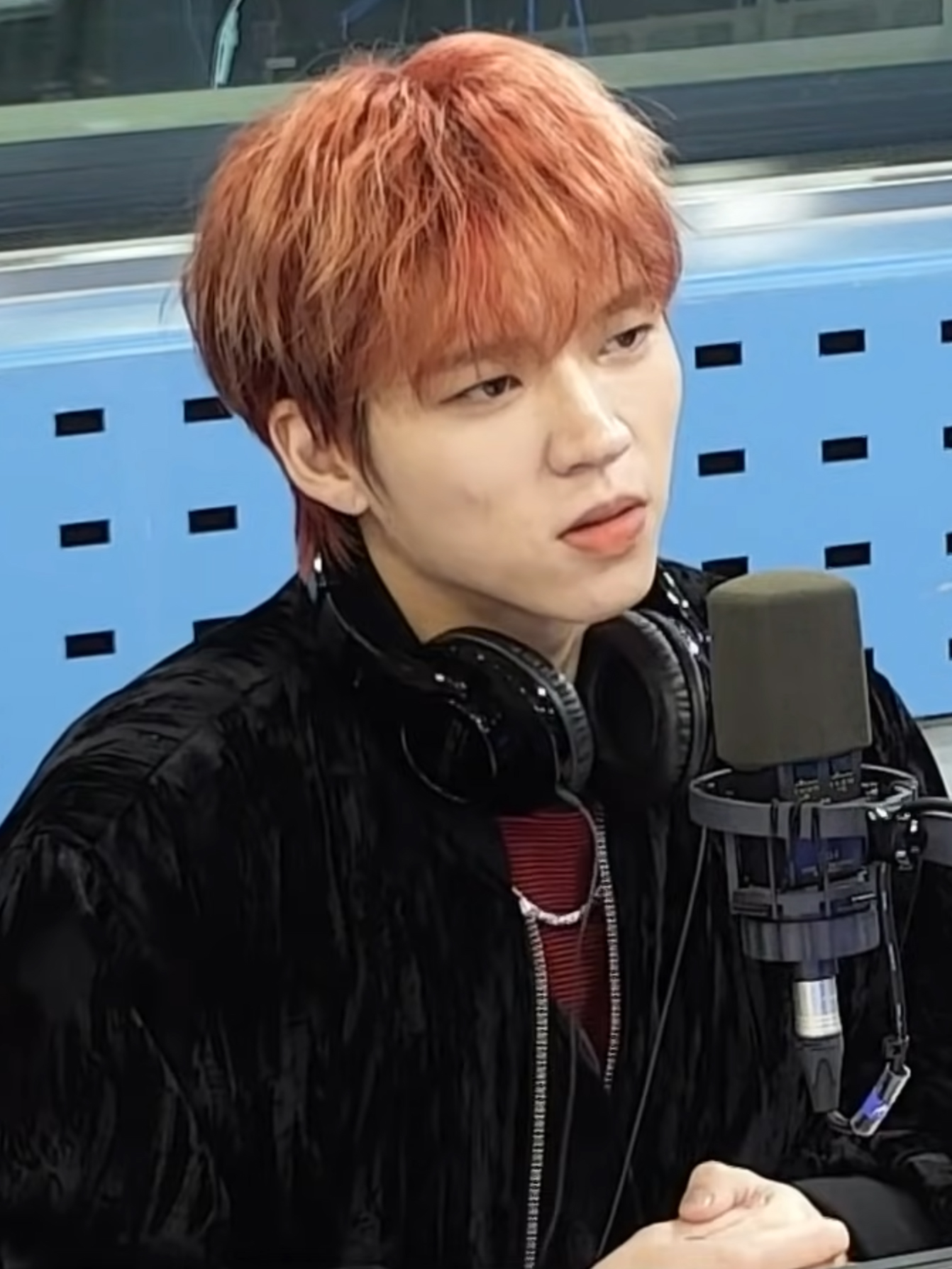
Nam on radio talk show Choi Hwa-jung's Power Time, October 2021

On October 6, 2021, Woollim Entertainment published a poster unveiling the title of the mini-album, With. Dual voice teasers with "calm" and "passion" versions were uploaded to YouTube a day later. Beginning on October 8, a pair of concept photos were posted for three consecutive days: the first batch presents a red-headed Nam donning a luxurious white shirt in one image and a sleeveless white jacket in the other; the second bundle shows him wearing a sheer wine-colored shirt and dressed in a refined suit; in the final grouping, the singer sports a black leather jacket in the first picture, while the second is set at a bar and displays him wearing a suit. Nam is seen in all the outfits in the concept trailer for With that was posted the following day. An album preview was shared on October 14 and the music video teaser of "Calm & Passion" was published on the subsequent day.

With and the music video for "Calm & Passion" were simultaneously released on October 19. The mini-album was also released in a tape art version with album artwork designed by artist Jo Yoon-jin. It marked two years and five months since the release of Nam's previous mini-album A New Journey in May 2019, and his first single since "When Fall Comes" that November. Hosted by MC Haru, Nam held an online showcase for the mini-album on the day of its release and performed the single on social media platform Twitter's live video feature Blue Room. Nam began promoting "Calm & Passion" on weekly music chart shows two days later. He performed the song on KBS2's Music Bank, Munhwa Broadcasting Corporation's (MBC) Show! Music Core, Seoul Broadcasting System's (SBS) Inkigayo, SBS MTV's The Show, and Mnet's M Countdown.

== Critical reception and commercial performance ==
With received favorable reviews from all three critics from TV Daily. Park Sang-hu felt that the sexy concept suited Nam. Kim Ji-ha sensed a different impression and complimented the singer's "weighty" vocals, while Kim Han-kil noted his "appealing tone and more mature aura". Writing for Sports Dong-a, Jeon Hyo-jin chose "Alone" as the "hidden track" of the album, saying that she could listen to Nam's "sexy voice to the heart's content". On the chart dated October 17 – 23, 2021, With debuted at number eleven on South Korea's national Gaon Album Chart. According to chart aggregator Hanteo Chart, the mini-album sold 25,379 copies by the end of the month.

== Track listing ==
With
No.	Title	Lyrics	Music	Arrangement	Length
1.	"With"		twlv, The Need	twlv, The Need	1:28
2.	"Calm & Passion" (냉정과 열정 사이; Naengjeonggwa Yeoljeong Sai)	Nam Woo-hyun, twlv, The Need	twlv, The Need	twlv, The Need	3:29
3.	"Lonely Night"	Seion	Lee Min-young, Seion, Yeul	Lee Min-young, Yeul	3:52
4.	"Somehow (My Diary)" (오늘따라; Oneul Ttara)	KZ	KZ, Nthonius	Nthonius	3:27
5.	"Alone"	Nam Woo-hyun	Croq, Chris Wahle, Bae Won-bin, Moon Won-woo	Croq, Bae Won-bin, Moon Won-woo	3:34
6.	"A Song for You"	Nam Woo-hyun, Jerry Carrot	Nam Woo-hyun, Jerry Carrot, Kim Jae-jong	Kim Jae-jong	3:30
Total length:					19:20

== Chart ==
Chart (2021)	Peak position
South Korean Albums (Gaon)	11
