= 0.0 MHz =

- Korean theatrical release poster
- Directed by: Yoo Sun-dong
- Written by: Yoo Sun-dong, Jak Jang
- Produced by: Oh Je-hun
- Starring: Choi Yoon-young; Shin Ju-hwan; Jung Eun-ji
- Cinematography: Cha Taek-kyun
- Edited by: Moon In-dae
- Music by: Lee In-gyu Sung Yoon-yong
- Production companies: Smile Entertainment, Monster Factory, Spotlight Pictures
- Distributed by: Shudder
- Release date: May 29, 2019 (South Korea)
- Running time: 102 minutes
- Country: South Korea
- Language: Korean
- Box office: $980 593

0.0 MHz is a 2019 South Korean supernatural horror film written and directed by Yoo Sun-dong and starring Choi Yoon-young, Shin Joo-hwan, and Jung Eun-ji. The film is based on webcomic of the same name by Jang Jak initially published in 2012. Shudder released the film on 23 April 2020.

== Plot ==
A girl who joins the student club of paranormal researchers and decides to go to an infamous village house in which a resident hanged herself a few years ago. Since then, there have been rumors among the locals about a vengeful ghost that settled in the house. The villagers even invited a shaman to drive away the spirit, but that woman was found dead. Not particularly believing in ghosts, the students come to the cursed house to conduct a ritual there and check what happens to the human brain during sleep, when its rhythms fall to 0.0 MHz.

== Cast ==
- Choi Yoon-young as Yoon-Jung
- Shin Joo-hwan as Han-Seok
- Jung Eun-ji as So-Hee
- Jung Won-chang as Tae-Soo
- Kim Nan-hee as Mother of suicide woman
- Lee Sung-yeol as Sang-Yeob
- Park Myung-shin as So-Hee's mother
- Nam Jung-hee as So-Hee's grandmother
