= Hi! School: Love On =

- Promotional poster
- Also known as: High School: Love On
- Genre: Romance; School; Supernatural; Teen; Comedy
- Written by: Lee Jae-yeon
- Directed by: Sung Joon-hae; Lee Eun-mi
- Starring: Kim Sae-ron; Nam Woo-hyun; Lee Sung-yeol
- Opening theme: "Heartthrob" by Infinite F
- Ending theme: "Chocolate Cherry Night" by Mad Clown and Yozoh
- Country of origin: South Korea
- Original language: Korean
- No. of episodes: 20

Production
- Producer: Sung Joon-hae
- Production companies: High School Co., Ltd. UBICULTURE; Mong-jak-so Co. Ltd. (formerly IKORAI Co. Ltd.)

Original release
- Network: KBS2
- Release: July 11 – December 19, 2014

Hi! School: Love On (Korean: 하이스쿨: 러브온) is a 2014 South Korean television series starring Kim Sae-ron, Nam Woo-hyun and Lee Sung-yeol of the band Infinite. It aired on KBS2 from July 11 to December 19, 2014 on Fridays at 20:55 for 20 episodes.

Hi! School: Love On is a teen fantasy romance series about an angel who has no choice but to become a human after unintentionally saving a male student in danger. The now-mortal angel then interacts with teenage high school students and learns about love, friendship, and what it means to be human.

== Plot ==
Sung-yeol and Woo-hyun are two 18-year-old boys who are both tormented by the emotional scars of broken families; Woo-hyun longs to see again his mother who left him as a child, while Sung-yeol lives with a stepmother that he detests and whom he blames for the break up of his parents' marriage. Both are considered asocial by Korean norms, although popular, brave and public spirited Woo-hyun drifts through school refusing to apply himself to his studies; Sung-yeol is studious and does well academically but is dismissive and disrespectful of his parents, aloof and detached from his classmates, appearing cold and arrogant to all. The lives of the two crash together when an angel falls from heaven.

Woo-hyun's classmate, Kim Jin-young, harbours a crush for him. Fearing for her daughter's grades from her infatuation with a slacker, Jin-young's mother arrives in class and warns Woo-hyun to stay away from her daughter, publicly humiliating her. Unable to deal with her overbearing mother Jin-young prepares to jump from the roof of the school building, where Woo-hyun finds her.

Going about their business invisible to mortals are angels who guide the souls of the dead to the next life, one such nameless angel spends her time in between clients watching Korean soap operas and watching over the lives of mortals, including Woo-hyun and Sung-yeol. For this, she is chided by a senior angel, "for its always the same story told over and over again just with different people." However the angel believes that by watching she can come to understand what it is to be human, and how mortals can love when the outcome will always be parting, and how they can live if death is all that waits.

Each angel is guided by a black book that contains the name of the soon to be deceased. The female angel arrives on the school rooftop to find Woo-hyun and Jin-young standing on the ledge. There is an unexpected thunderstorm and the name and picture of the soul to be collected oscillates between Woo-hyun and Jin-young as if it cannot decide who is to die. The angel drops her book and in the moment that she takes to recover it Woo-hyun pushes Jin-young to safety but over-balances and falls to the ground; instinctively the angel uses her powers to save his life, however they both pass out as they crash into the bonnet of a car.

Woo-hyun and the angel wake up in hospital, Woo-hyun is surprised that he is unscathed but the angel is shocked, when she realises that Woo-hyun can see her, that he can touch her, that she can feel the ground with her toes, that she has a heartbeat, and that she is in fact now mortal.

Believing her to be suffering from amnesia due to his landing on top of her Woo-hyun takes the angel to the local police station, where under questioning she stumbles on the name Yi Seul-bi. Pressed she randomly selected syllables from magazines in the police station, from which the policeman (Sung-yeol's father, Hwang Woo-jin) puzzled out a name that made sense. Woo-hyun is about to leave the newly named Seul-bi to the care of the police when Jin-young's mother arrives (with Woo-hyun's form tutor and grandmother in tow) threatening to sue Woo-hyun for trying to entice her daughter into a suicide pact, and with trumped up accusations of violence and bullying. Being well disposed to Woo-hyun from an earlier encounter, Hwang Woo-jin refuses to entertain the charges. Woo-hyun is about to leave Seul-bi to the care of the police, when his grandmother insists that they take her in as he owes her his life.

Seul-bi moves in with Woo-hyun and his grandmother, working part-time in their rice cake restaurant. Forgetting that she is now mortal Seul-bi is fearless in the face of injustice, authority and things she sees as wrong, traits that Woo-hyun appreciates and the two make themselves responsible for each other's well-being and happiness. Woo-hyun is forced by Jin-young's mother to transfer to a new school, the same school that Sung-yeol attends and the two become both rivals and allies. Curious about high school, and emotionally attached to Woo-hyun, Seul-bi decides to join him in school, where Sung-yeol also falls for her.

Seul-bi gets her wish of knowing humanity better, in high school learning firsthand the joys and sorrows of being a normal teenager, but she must also face a test unknown to any teenager nor angel, for on the day that she became mortal, the soul she should have led into the next life was Woo-hyun's.

== Cast ==
=== Main characters ===
- Nam Woo-hyun as Shin Woo-hyun, an 18-year-old high school student who is aware about his good looks but is failing academically.
- Kim Sae-ron as Lee Seul-bi, originally an ageless, nameless, angel who becomes human. After she becomes human, she struggles to adjust to her new life.
- Lee Sung-yeol as Hwang Sung-yeol, an 18-year-old high school student, a loner, and #1 student in the high school.
- Choi Su-rin as Ahn Ji-hye, a high school ethics/civics teacher, stepmother of Sung-yeol and biological mother of Woo-hyun. She had left Woo-hyun with his grandmother when he was very young.
- Jung Jae-soon as Gong Mal-sook, Woo-hyun's paternal grandmother, who raised him due to his abandonment by his mother
- Cho Yeon-woo as Hwang Woo-jin, policeman, the father of Sung-yeol.

=== Supporting characters ===
==== Students of Grade 11 Class 3 ====
- Shin Hyun-tak as Kang Ki-soo (18), Woo-hyun's best friend. Works many part-time jobs to help his family.
- Kim Young-jae as Choi Jae-suk (18). School bully. His father abuses him, causing him to act the way he does at school due to his loneliness. He has a crush on Da-yool.
- Kim Min-young as Na Young-eun (18). Likes Sung-yeol and Kang Ki-soo. Ye-na's best friend.
- Na Hae-ryung as Lee Ye-na (18). Likes Woo-hyun, Seul-bi's rival. She often bullied Seul-bi to get her away from Woo-hyun. But this often backfired on her since Seul-bi would never know what's going on and undermine the situation. She is best friends with Young-eun.
- Kim Soo-yeon as Lee Da-yool (18). She dreams of being a singer. but since she has no money, she goes to clubs to find people who can get her closer to her dream.
- Kim Min-seok as Park Byung-wook (18), Jae-suk's lackey. He eventually leaves the group when Jae-seok starts bullying Seul-bi, not because he likes her, but he doesn't like to bully girls and children.
- Baek Seung-heon as Yang Tae-ho (18), Jae-seok's lackey - solo. Likes Joo-ah and always get her the newest novels to get her attention.
- Jung Yoo-min as Kim Joo-ah (18), class vice-president. Has feelings for Tae-ho, but never showed them until Tae-ho's father got admitted into the hospital. Her father abused her when she was young. She works many jobs to stay afloat. She is friends with Seul-bi.
- Changjae as Lee Suk-hoon (18), class president
- Lee Si-hoo as Go Chun-sik (18), a coward bullied by Jae-suk's gang but stands up for himself later. In earlier episodes, some said that he may have romantic feelings for Woo-hyun, but the drama between the two did not develop any further.
- Song Ji-ho as Seo Yo-han (18), became substitute for Chun-sik for being bullied by Jae-suk's gang.

==== High school teachers ====
- Kim Kwang-sik as Kim Kwang-sik, music teacher
- Han Soo-young as Choi So-jin
- --- as Park Han-gil
- Lee Jun-hyeok as Ha Dong-geun, P.E. teacher
- Choi Sung-kook as first angel to become human
- Fabien Yoon as Phillip, literature teacher
- Lee Chang-joo as Chun Byung-chul, senior angel, an angel and friend of Seul-bi who tries to help her become an angel again. It is hinted throughout the series that he has feelings for Seul-bi.

=== Extended cast ===
- Baek Soo-hee as Eun-bi
- --- as Lee Yoo-jung
- Kang Sung-ah as Han Jung-min
- --- as Kim Yoon-hee
- --- as Detective Park
- --- as Woo-hyun's former homeroom teacher
- Choa as Kim Jin-young, who has a crush on Woo-hyun, which causes her mother, a school trustee, to have Woo-hyun transferred to another school
- Kim Ye-boon as Choi Sung-gook, Jin-young's mother

== Original soundtrack ==
High School Love On: Original Sound Track

Soundtrack album by Various Artists
- Released: December 29, 2014
- Genres: Pop, K-pop, soundtrack
- Label: LOEN Entertainment

| No. | Title | Artist | Length |
|---|---|---|---|
| 1. | "아까워" (Too Good) | Jung Gi-go feat. Min-woo of Boyfriend | 3:30 |
| 2. | "쇼콜라 체리밤" (Chocolate Cherry Night) | Mad Clown and Yozoh | 3:05 |
| 3. | "뜬뜬뜬뜬 뜨든뜬" (C'mon C'mon) | Crayon Pop | 3:08 |
| 4. | "야야야" (Ya Ya Ya) | Urban Zakapa | 3:03 |
| 5. | "내 맘이 그게 아닌데" (What My Heart Wants to Say) | Lel feat. Linzy of Fiestar | 4:27 |
| 6. | "너의 왈츠" (Your Waltz) | Afternight Project | 4:21 |
| 7. | "너를" (You) | Afternight Project | 3:53 |
| 8. | "작은 별" (Little Star) | Standing Egg | 3:32 |
| 9. | "가슴이 뛴다" (Heartbeat) | Infinite F | 3:30 |

== Ratings ==
| Ep. | Broadcast date | Title | Average audience share (Nationwide) | |
| Ep. | Broadcast date | Title | TNmS | AGB Nielsen |
|---|---|---|---|---|
| 1 | 2014/03/06 | Destiny? Irresistible trouble! | 4.0 | 3.6 |
| 2 | 2014/03/07 | Encounter? Mysterious coincidence! | —N/a | 3.2 |
| 3 | 2014/03/13^{1} | Excitement? The unstoppable flutter! | —N/a | 3.1 |
| 4 | 2014/03/14 | Baby steps? First step when learning to love! | —N/a | 3.1 |
| 5 | 2014/03/20 | Drawing a line? Drawing a line to cross it! | —N/a | 3.4 |
| 6 | 2014/03/21 | Confession? Always the wrong timing! | —N/a | 2.9 |
| 7 | 2014/03/27 | Suspicion? Wanting to believe that it's not true! | —N/a | 3.0 |
| 8 | 2014/03/28^{2} | Regret? All you remember is the bad! | —N/a | 3.3 |
| 9 | 2014/04/03^{3} | Consolation? The hope that I could take all your pain! | —N/a | 3.6 |
| 10 | 2014/04/04 | One-sided love? When you force yourself to look away! | —N/a | 3.0 |
| 11 | 2014/04/10 | Secret? The heavier the truth the better it floats! | —N/a | 3.7 |
| 12 | 2014/04/11 | Favor? It breaks my heart when I can't do it! | —N/a | 3.0 |
| 13 | 2014/04/17 | Choice? The pain of losing all for you! | —N/a | 3.6 |
| 14 | 2014/04/18 | Longing? You who I keep running into! | —N/a | 3.2 |
| 15 | 2014/04/19 | Wounds? I give you wounds but it hurts me more! | —N/a | 3.5 |
| 16 | 2014/04/20 | Sincerity? Something I want to hide for your sake! | —N/a | 3.0 |
| 17 | 2014/04/21^{4} | Love? I wish I had said, "I love you!" | —N/a | 3.0 |
| 18 | 2014/05/01 | Friendship? You're just another me! | —N/a | 3.5 |
| 19 | 2014/05/02 | Goodbye? Only to be back again! | —N/a | 3.5 |
| 20 | 2014/05/08 | Fate? The distance between your heart and mine: 3 inches! | —N/a | 3.5 |

Note

- ^1 Episode 3 was preempted because of K League All-Star Game.
- ^2 Episode 8 was preempted because of a baseball game.
- ^3 Episode 9 was preempted due to the opening ceremony of the 2014 Asian Games
- ^4 Episode 17 was preempted because of the Grand Bell Awards
