= The Guardian (2026 film) =

- Theatrical release poster
- Hangul: 납치 48시간
- RR: Napchi 48sigan
- MR: Napch'i 48sigan
- Directed by: Jeong Jang-hwan
- Starring: Nam Woo-hyun; Park Eun-hye; Han Jae-seok
- Production company: GV Labs; Will Studios; Parallax Studio; Robosheep Studios; Ovation Productions; Viva Films
- Distributed by: Noori Pictures (South Korea); Viva Films (Philippines)
- Release dates: June 17, 2026 (South Korea); September 2, 2026 (Philippines)
- Running time: 90 minutes
- Countries: Philippines; South Korea

The Guardian (Korean: 납치 48시간) is an action drama film directed by Jeong Jang-hwan and starring Nam Woo-hyun, Park Eun-hye, and Han Jae-seok.

== Cast ==
- Nam Woo-hyun as Park Do Jun, a South Korean expatriate in the Philippines
- Park Eun-hye as Mi-jin, Do Jun's mother who is a gambling addict who moved with her son in the Philippines
- Han Jae Seok as a Korean gang leader based in the Philippines who kidnapped Mi-jin
- Yassi Pressman as Sandara, an aspiring K-pop idol
- Eric Ejercito as Coco, Do Jun's coworker
- Ashtine Olviga as a K-pop auditionee

== Production ==
The Guardian is a co-production involving multiple companies including GV Labs and Will Studios. Philippine-based companies involved are Ovation Productions, Parallax Studio, Robosheep Studios, and Viva Films. Jeong Jang-hwan served as the film director The cast of actors include both South Koreans and Filipinos.

In December 2023, the South Korean side was conducting ocular visits in Metro Manila to prepare for the principal photography in the Philippines. In March 2024, filming for The Guardian was concluded and the post-production in South Korea had begun.

== Release ==
The Guardian's distributor was Noori Pictures and was set to premier in the latter part of 2024. The film released on June 17, 2026 in South Korea. It is set to be released in the Philippines on September 2, 2026 by Viva Films.
