= Dream (Jung Eun-ji EP) =

EP by Jung Eunji
- Released: April 18, 2016
- Recorded: 2016
- Genre: K-pop; ballad
- Language: Korean
- Label: Plan A Entertainment; LOEN Entertainment

Jung Eunji chronology
| Dream (2016) | The Space (2017) |

Singles from Dream
- 1. "Hopefully Sky" Released: April 18, 2016

Dream is the debut extended play by the South Korean singer Jung Eunji. It was released on April 18, 2016 by Plan A Entertainment and distributed by LOEN Entertainment. The EP sold 30,000+ copies on its first month of release.

== Background and release ==
On April 7, 2016, Plan A Entertainment confirmed that Apink's Eunji will be releasing her first solo mini-album on April 18. This was confirmed on April 11 by A Plan Entertainment, with the announcement that Eunji would debut as a solo artist with the mini album "Dream" on April 18, with a title track "Hopefully Sky".

The title track "Hopefully Sky" features the Korean folk singer, Hareem, who played the harmonica for the background. Eunji also personally wrote the lyrics for the track, and is inspired by her father who works overseas to support their family.

== Promotion ==
Eunji began promotions of title track "Hopefully Sky" on music shows on April 21. She first performed the song on Mnet's M! Countdown, followed by performances on SBS's Inkigayo, MBC's Show Champion, KBS' Music Bank, and SBS MTV's The Show. She also performed the b-side "Love is Like The Wind" several times, alongside the title track.

== Singles ==
On April 18, 2016, Eunji was announced to be releasing "Hopefully Sky", a promotional song for the album. A teaser video for the song was released on April 12, followed by its music video and digital release on April 18. Eunji performed the song for the first time at the Mnet's M! Countdown. The song peaked at number 3 on Gaon Digital Chart.

== Track listing ==
| No. | Title | Lyrics | Music | Arrangement | Length |
|---|---|---|---|---|---|
| 1. | "Hopefully Sky (feat. Hareem)" (하늘바라기; Haneulbaragi) | Duble Sidekick, Jung Eunji, Long Candy | Duble Sidekick, Jung Eunji, Long Candy | Duble Sidekick, EASTWEST | 3:40 |
| 2. | "Love is Like the Wind" (사랑은 바람처럼; Sarangeun baramcheoreom) | Beom & Nang | Beom & Nang | Beom & Nang | 3:53 |
| 3. | "It's Okay" | Kim Sejin | Kim Sejin, Heo Sungjin | Kim Sejin, Heo Sungjin | 3:10 |
| 4. | "Home" | E.One, EJ Show | E.One, EJ Show | E.One, EJ Show, LEL | 3:23 |
| 5. | "Love Is" (사랑이란; Sarangiran) | Kim Eana | Lee Cheolwon, Kang Myungshin | Lee Cheolwon, Kang Myungshin, LEL | 3:54 |
| 6. | "Hopefully Sky (Piano Version)" (하늘바라기; Haneulbaragi) | Duble Sidekick, Jung Eunji, Long Candy | Duble Sidekick, Jung Eunji, Long Candy | Duble Sidekick, EASTWEST | 4:16 |
| Total length: | | | | | 22:21 |

== Chart performance ==
| Chart | Peak position | Physical sales |
|---|---|---|
| South Korea (Gaon Weekly Album Chart) | 3 | 39,999+ |
| South Korea (Gaon Monthly Album Chart) | 8 | 39,999+ |
| South Korea (Gaon Yearly Album Chart) | 70 | 39,999+ |

== Accolades ==
| Date | Song | Show/Program |
|---|---|---|
| April 28, 2016 | "Hopefully Sky" | Mnet's M Countdown |
| May 1, 2016 | "Hopefully Sky" | SBS's Inkigayo |

== Release history ==
| Country | Date | Format | Label |
|---|---|---|---|
| Worldwide | April 18, 2016 | Digital download | Plan A Entertainment, LOEN Entertainment |
| South Korea | April 18, 2016 | Digital download, CD | Plan A Entertainment, LOEN Entertainment |
| South Korea | June 7, 2016 (Note: The limited edition LP version of "Dream" is only available through pre-order for approximately 2 weeks.) | LP record | Plan A Entertainment, LOEN Entertainment |
