= Lee Sung-yeol =

South Korean singer and actor (born 1991)

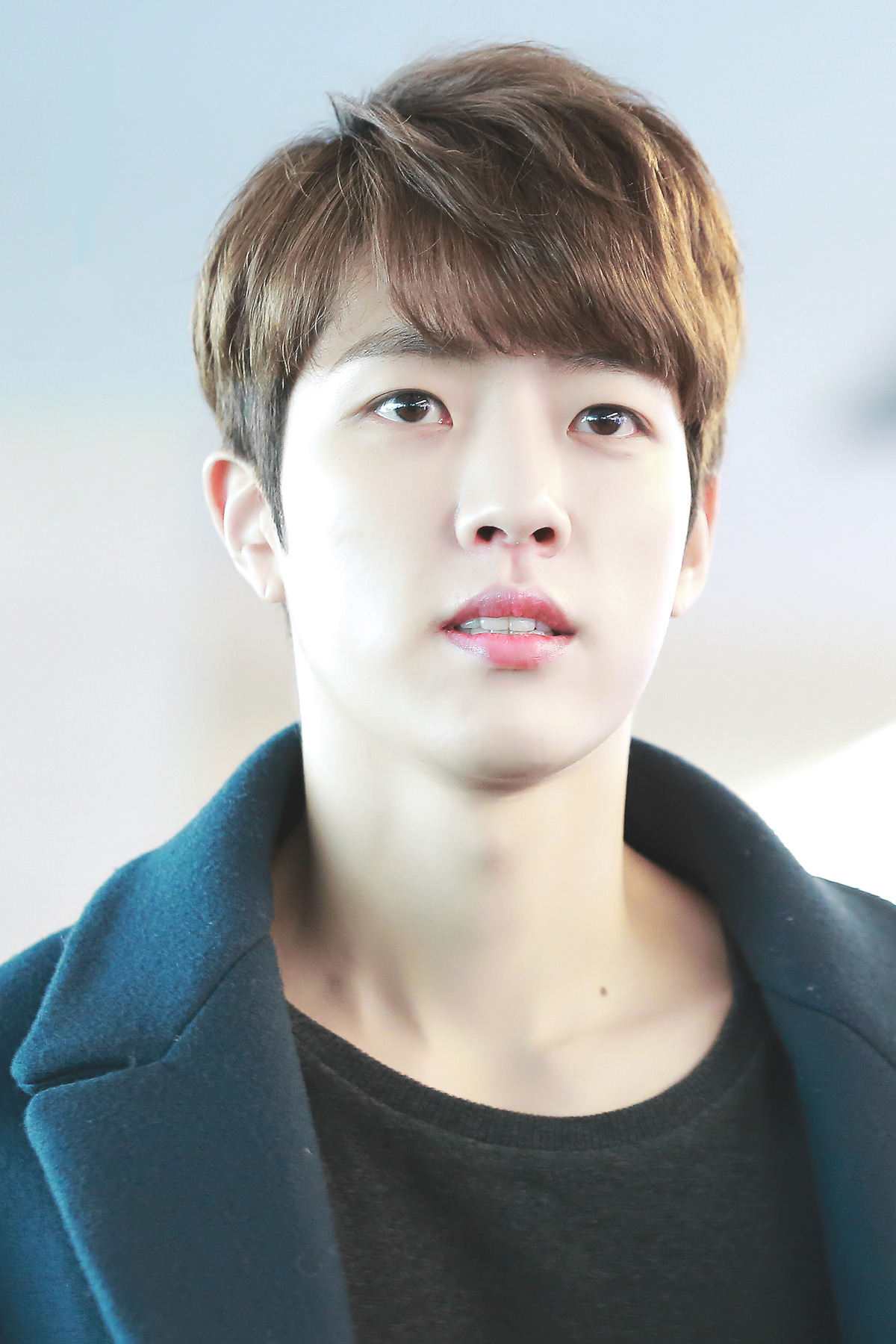
- Lee at Haneda Airport, December 2017
- Born: August 27, 1991 (age 35); Yongin, Gyeonggi-do, South Korea
- Education: Daekyung University
- Occupations: Singer; actor
- Agent: Management 2sang
- Musical career
- Genres: K-pop; J-pop
- Instrument: Vocals
- Years active: 2010–present
- Label: Woollim
- Member of: Infinite; Infinite F

Korean name
- Hangul: 이성열
- Hanja: 李成烈
- RR: I Seongyeol
- MR: I Sŏngyŏl

Lee Sung-yeol (Korean: 이성열; Hanja: 李成烈; born August 27, 1991), known mononymously as Sungyeol, is a South Korean singer and actor. He is a member of the South Korean boy band Infinite and its sub-group Infinite F.

== Biography ==
Lee Sung-yeol was born on August 27, 1991, in Suji-gu, Yongin, Gyeonggi-do. He has a younger brother named Lee Dae-yeol, who was also signed with Woollim Entertainment and was a member and leader of the boy group Golden Child which debuted in August 2017.

On February 15, 2013, Lee graduated from Daekyeung University, majoring in Applied Music with fellow Infinite members Sung-kyu, L, Dong-woo and Hoya.

== Career ==
=== Pre-debut ===
Prior to debut, Lee appeared in the television series as an extra such as Boys Over Flowers, Good Job, Good Job, and Jolly Widows. He originally planned to debut as an actor, and was once an actor trainee under SM Academy.

=== 2010–2013: Career beginnings ===
Lee was the last member to join Infinite. On June 9, 2010, Lee made his debut as a vocalist of Infinite with their first EP, First Invasion.

Lee made his acting debut in 2011 with the drama While You Were Sleeping.

On October 21, 2013, Lee was cast as a main character in the web drama Love for Ten: Generation of Youth with 4Minute's Son Ji-hyun.

=== 2014–2016: Infinite F and acting roles ===
In 2014, Lee and bandmate Woo-hyun were cast in the KBS2 drama Hi! School-Love On with rising child actress Kim Sae-ron. The drama was broadcast from July 11 to December 19, 2014.

Lee and bandmates L and Sungjong formed a subgroup called Infinite F and were announced during the "One Great Step Returns" encore concert. They performed their song "Heartthrob" from the Hi! School: Love On soundtrack. Their first officially released song, "Crazy", was included on Infinite's second album, Season 2. They made their debut in Japan with their first single album, Koi No Sign, on November 19, 2014, following in Korea with their first single album, Azure, on December 2, 2014.

On May 22, 2015, Lee was confirmed to be in the cast of JTBC's D-Day.

=== 2017–2020: Transition to lead roles ===
In 2017, Lee was cast as the male lead in a one-act drama called Temporary Cold Case Task Force, with rookie actress Lee Ye Hyun. Lee starred in the KBS1 daily drama Love Returns.

In 2019, Lee starred in the horror film 0.0MHz alongside Apink's Eun-ji, based on the webtoon with the same name.

Lee enlisted as part of his mandatory military service as an active duty soldier on March 26, 2019. He was released early on October 4, 2020, due to COVID-19 precautions, and was officially discharged on October 27, 2020.

=== 2021–present: Departure from Woollim ===
On March 31, 2021, Lee departed from Woollim Entertainment after his contract expired.

On June 7, 2021, Lee signed with Management 2sang.

== Filmography ==
=== Film ===
Year	Title	Role	Notes	Ref.
2019	0.0 MHz	Sang Yeob	Debut film	
2024	4:44 : Time Of Fear			

=== Television series ===
Year	Title	Role	Notes	Ref.
2009	Boys Over Flowers	Student	Cameo	
2009	Good Job, Good Job	Student	Cameo	
2009	Jolly Widows	Student	Cameo	
2011	While You Were Sleeping	Yoon So-joon	Supporting role	
2011	Welcome to Convenience Store	Himself (voice)	Guest role	
2013	Puberty Medley	Student Council President	Cameo; special drama	
2013	Love for Ten: Generation of Youth	Jeong Gi-yeok	Main role; web drama	
2014	Hi! School: Love On	Hwang Sung-yeol	Main role	
2015	D-Day	Ahn Dae-gil	Supporting role	
2017–2018	Love Returns	Hong Seok-pyo	Lead role	
2021	Time to Remember	Jung Woo-jin	Lead role; web drama	
2023	Numbers	Shim Hyung-woo	Supporting role	
2024	Iron Family	Choi Hyung-chul	Supporting role	

=== Television shows ===
Year	Title	Notes	Ref.
2011	Sesame Player	Cast member	
2012	Ranking King	Cast member	
2013	Law of the Jungle in Belize	Cast member	
2016	Law of the Jungle in Panama	Cast member	
2017	Law of the Jungle in Kota Manado	Cast member	
2017	2017 Woollim Pick	MC	

== Theater ==
Year	English title	Korean title	Role	Ref.
2022–2023	My heart dances when I see a rainbow in the wide sky	넓은 하늘의 무지개를 보면 내 마음은 춤춘다	Jo Won-woo	
