= Kim Young-jae (actor, born 1995) =

South Korean actor

- Born: February 25, 1995 (age 31); South Korea
- Occupation: Actor
- Years active: 2011–present
- Agent: SidusHQ

Korean name
- Hangul: 김영재
- RR: Gim Yeongjae
- MR: Kim Yŏngjae

Kim Young-jae (Korean: 김영재; born February 25, 1995) is a South Korean actor. He played a supporting role in the 2014 teen series Hi! School – Love On.

== Filmography ==
=== Television series ===
Year	Title	Role	Notes	Ref.
2011	My Daughter the Flower	young Goo Sang-hyuk		
2013	Can't Stand Anymore	Hwang Jae-min		
2013	The Heirs	young Kim Won		
2014	Hi! School: Love On	Choi Jae-seok		
2015	Great Stories "The Kim Sisters"	Sang-joon		

=== Web series ===
Year	Title	Role	Notes	Ref.
2024	Branding in Seongsu	Seong Su-dong		
