= Write.. (EP) =

EP by Woohyun
- Released: May 9, 2016
- Recorded: 2015–2016
- Genre: K-pop; Pop rock; Ballad
- Length: 21:09
- Language: Korean
- Label: Woollim Entertainment; SM C&C; LOEN Entertainment
- Producer: J.Yoon; Nam Woo-hyun

Woohyun chronology
Write.. (2016)	Second Write.. (2018)

Singles from Write..
- 1. "Still I Remember (끄덕끄덕)" Released: May 9, 2016

Write.. is the debut extended play by South Korean singer Woohyun. It was released by Woollim Entertainment on May 9, 2016. The EP marked the official solo debut of Woohyun, who had been known as a member of South Korean boy group Infinite for nearly six years.

The album was sold out before its Offline release on May 9 with a total of 50,000 copies.

== Background and release ==
In July 2015, Woohyun revealed in an interview with Infinite member on KBS' Music Bank that he is currently working his solo album. Regarding which genre he would like to try out, Woohyun said, "Because I like ballads, I want to do a ballad. I even have ambitions for a band or dance. I am working on my solo album, too."

In early April 2016, Woollim Entertainment confirmed that Woohyun will be making his solo debut in May. On April 26, 2016, Woohyun was announced to be debuting as a solo singer with Write.. was schedule released on May 9, becoming the second Infinite member to have released a solo album, after Sungkyu. On May 3, the album's tracklist was released, revealed that Woohyun participated to written and composed three tracks of six tracks of the album.

== Promotion ==
Woohyun held a showcase for Write.. on May 9 with Infinite's Sungkyu as the MC. He started promotion on television weekly music program on May 12.

== Track listing ==
No.	Title	Lyrics	Music	Arrangement	Length
1.	"Write.."		J.Yoon	J.Yoon	00:58
2.	"Still I Remember" (끄덕끄덕)	Kim Eana	J.Yoon	J.Yoon	04:18
3.	"Passerby" (그 사람)	Kim Eana	J.Yoon	J.Yoon	04:31
4.	"Nostalgia" (향기)	Nam Woohyun	Nam Woohyun	J.Yoon	04:34
5.	"Gravity"	Nam Woohyun; KZ	Nam Woohyun; KZ; Taebong Lee	KZ; Taebong Lee	03:22
6.	"Stand by Me"	Nam Woohyun; Conan (Rocoberry)	Nam Woohyun; Conan (Rocoberry)	Conan (Rocoberry)	03:26
Total length:					21:09

== Charts ==
Chart	Peak position
South Korea Gaon Weekly Albums Chart	2
South Korea Gaon Monthly Albums Chart	2

Chart	Peak position
South Korea Hanteo Weekly Albums Chart	1
South Korea Hanteo Monthly Albums Chart	2

== Release history ==
Region	Date	Format	Label
South Korea	May 9, 2016	CD, Digital download	Woollim Entertainment, LOEN Entertainment
Worldwide	May 9, 2016	Digital download	S.M. Culture & Contents, Woollim Entertainment
