= Jung Eun-ji =

South Korean singer-songwriter and actress (born 1993)

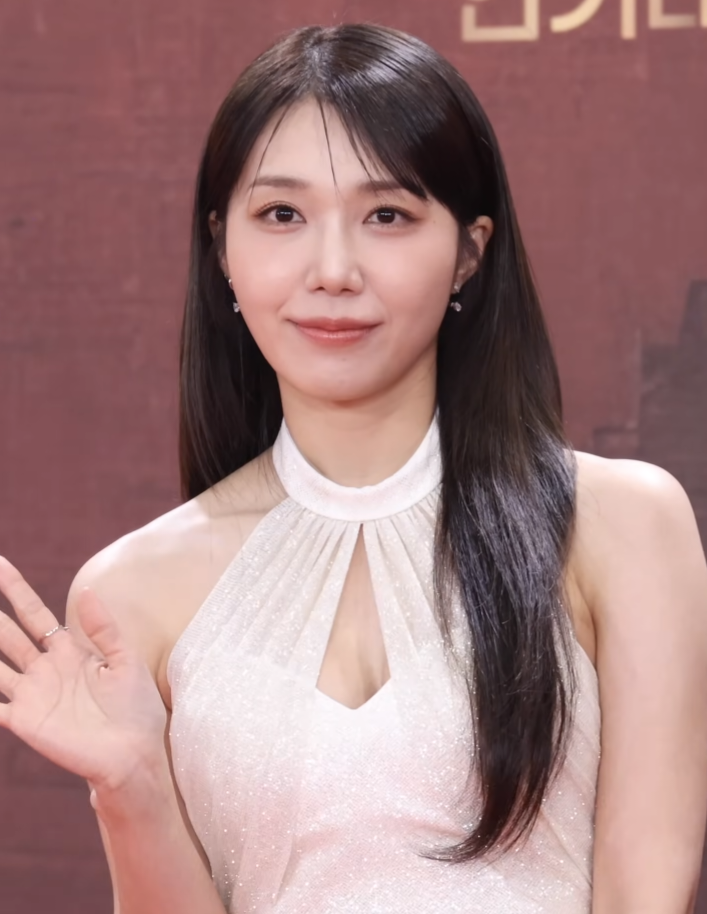
- Jung in December 2025
- Born: Jung Hye-rim; August 18, 1993 (age 33); Busan, South Korea
- Occupations: Singer; songwriter; actress
- Years active: 2011–present
- Musical career
- Genres: K-pop; ballad; folk; pop-rock
- Instruments: Vocals; piano
- Labels: Billions; IST
- Member of: Apink

Korean name
- Hangul: 정은지
- RR: Jeong Eunji
- MR: Chŏng Ŭnji

Former name
- Hangul: 정혜림
- RR: Jeong Hyerim
- MR: Chŏng Hyerim

Jung Eun-ji (Korean: 정은지; born Jung Hye-rim on August 18, 1993) is a South Korean singer-songwriter and actress, best known for being a member of the South Korean girl group Apink. Jung released her debut solo extended play Dream in 2016.

Jung made her acting debut in the critically acclaimed hit coming-of-age television series Reply 1997 in 2012. She won several awards for her role including the 49th Baeksang Arts Award for Best New TV Actress. She has since had roles in That Winter, the Wind Blows (2013), Lovers of Music (2014), Cheer Up! (2015), Untouchable (2017), Work Later, Drink Now (2021–2022), Blind (2022), Miss Night and Day (2024), and Pump Up the Healthy Love (2025).

== Early life and education ==
Jung Eun-ji was born as Jung Hye-rim in Haeundae District, Busan on August 18, 1993. Her name was legally changed to Jung Eun-ji when she was in middle school. She has a younger brother who is eight years younger than her.

Jung attended Shinjae Elementary School, Jaesong Girls' Middle School, and Busan Hyehwa Girls' High School. She traveled back and forth to Busan to continue her studies while promoting as an idol in Seoul. She graduated from high school in February 2012.

== Career ==
=== Pre-debut ===
In July 2004, Jung participated in the KBS Busan Nursery Rhyme Contest Fun Day and won the grand prize.

In February 2011, Jung passed the audition to become the main vocalist of Apink. On February 14, 2011, she moved to Seoul to start her debut preparation. She had not received any professional training prior to joining Apink, and trained for only two months with the group before debuting.

=== 2011: Debut with Apink ===
In March 2011, Jung was revealed to be the fourth member of Apink via an online video of her covering Jennifer Hudson's "Love You I Do". Jung joined the rest of the group to film Apink News prior to their debut. On April 21, 2011, Jung made her debut as a main vocalist of Apink on Mnet's M Countdown with two songs, "Mollayo" and "Wishlist", from the group's debut extended play Seven Springs of Apink.

=== 2012–2015: Solo activities, acting debut, and rising popularity ===
Jung has collaborated with various artists for OSTs and promotional songs. For the project A Cube for Season #Green, Jung Eun-ji and fellow Cube artist Yang Yo-seob, sang the duet track "Love Day".

Jung made her acting debut in Reply 1997, a 1990s nostalgic dramedy which became one of the highest-rated Korean series on cable television. She played the female protagonist, a hardcore H.O.T. fan who becomes a TV drama writer. Jung was complimented by critics and audiences for her comedic and emotional acting, which was impressive for a newcomer, as well as for her authentic Busan dialect. The role won her several awards, including the 49th Baeksang Arts Award for Best New TV Actress.

In August 2012, Jung recorded two promotional singles, "All For You" and "Our Love Like This" with Reply 1997 co-star Seo In-guk for the drama's soundtrack. "All For You" became one of the best-selling singles of the year on the Gaon Single Chart.

In September 2012, Jung was cast in the Korean staging of the Hollywood film-turned-musical Legally Blonde, playing the lead role of Elle Woods. The show ran from November 16, 2012, to March 17, 2013.

In October 2012, Jung was then cast as the second female lead in the 2013 melodrama That Winter, the Wind Blows. For her role, she won Best Performance at the 2nd APAN Star Awards and New Star Award at the 2013 SBS Drama Awards.

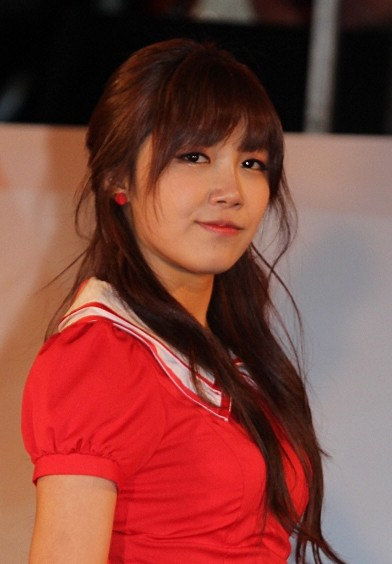
Jung in 2013

In 2013 and 2014, Jung collaborated with label-mate Huh Gak for duets titled "Short Hair" and "Break Up To Make Up" respectively, which were well received by listeners and ranked atop major online music charts in Korea. She released her first solo single titled "Its You" for the soundtrack of Three Days.

In 2014, she starred in another musical, the stage adaptation of 2004 series Full House. Afterwards, Jung starred in the romantic comedy series Lovers of Music, which depicts a female singer's struggles to become successful in the old-fashioned musical genre trot.

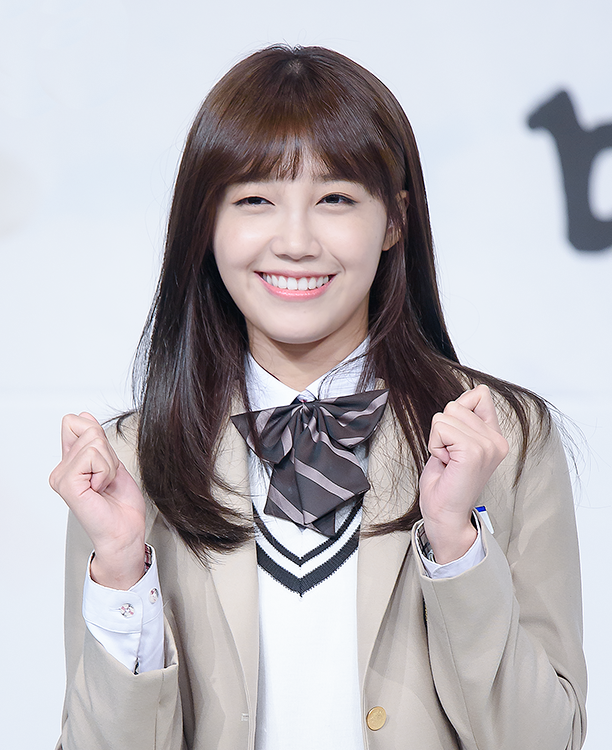
Jung at the press conference for drama Cheer Up! in October 2015

In 2015, Jung starred as the female lead in KBS2 high school drama Cheer Up! playing the role of a high school student who ranks at the bottom of her class.

=== 2016–present: Solo debut, continuous solo activities, and acting resurgence ===
On April 18, 2016, Jung debuted as a solo artist with the EP Dream, which consisted of six songs. The title track "Hopefully Sky" is written by Jung, which recounts the times she spent with her father. "Hopefully Sky" topped eight local music charts, and the album sold 30,000 copies upon release. In April 2017, Jung released her second EP The Space. The title track "The Spring" and its accompanying music video was unveiled on April 10, and debuted within the top ten spots on local music charts. From June 3 to 5, Jung held her first solo concert titled "Attic" at Ewha Womans University's Samsung Hall.

In 2017, Jung was cast in JTBC's action melodrama Untouchable which began airing on November 24.

In 2018, Jung was cast in the horror film 0.0MHz, based on the webtoon of the same name. On October 18, 2018, Jung released a music video for the single "Being There", from her third EP Hyehwa.

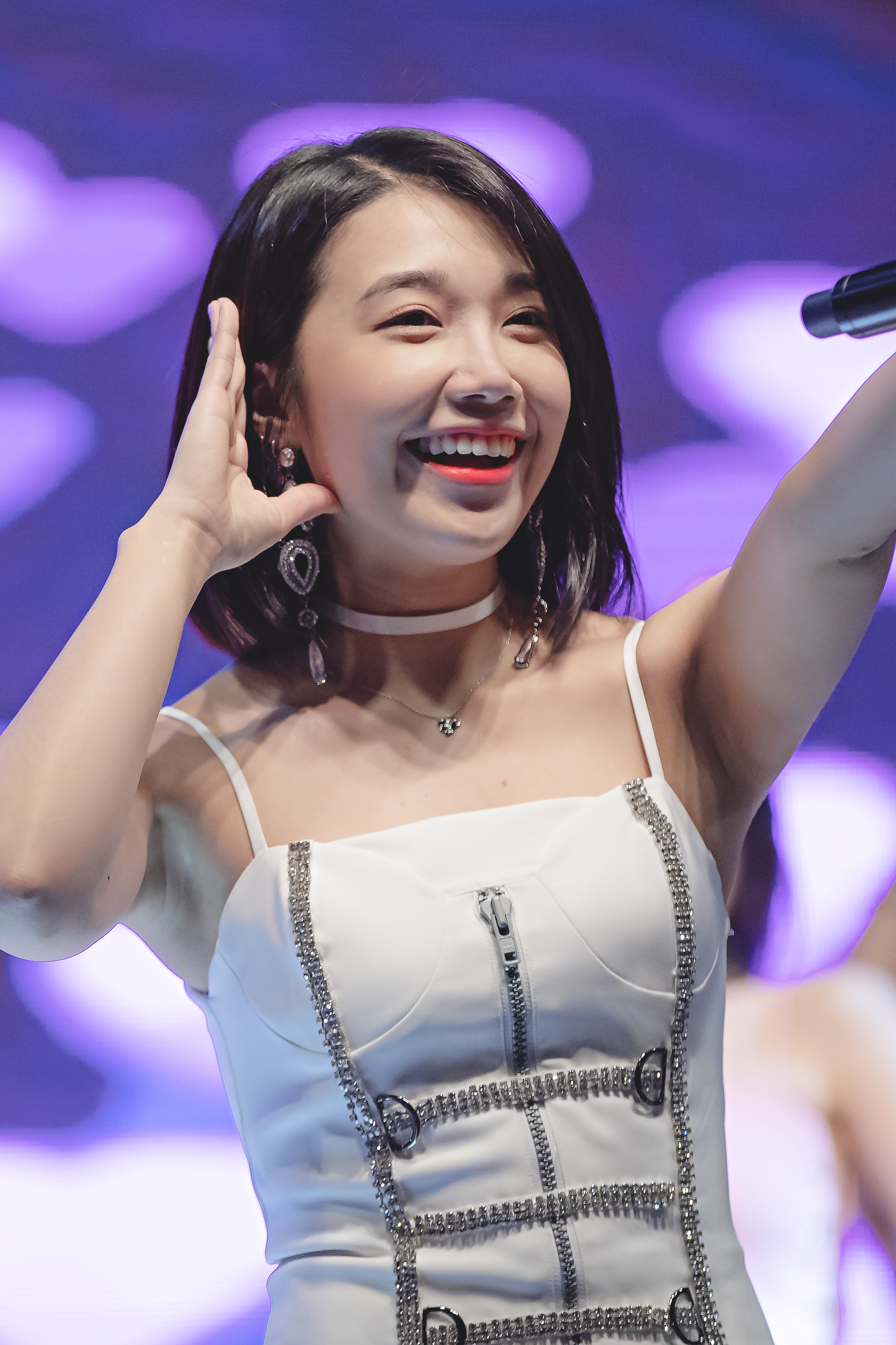
Jung performing in 2019

In 2020, Jung was cast in the musical Natasha, Pierre & The Great Comet of 1812. On July 15, 2020, Jung released her fourth EP Simple, along with the title track "Away".

In 2021, Jung was cast in TVING's web series Work Later, Drink Now as Kang Ji-goo, an origami YouTuber. The series premiered at the Cannes International Series Festival 2022 from April 1 to April 6, 2022.

In September 2022, she starred in the mystery thriller television series Blind, portraying the role of a social worker.

On October 30, 2022, IST Entertainment announced that the release of the remake album Log, which was originally scheduled to be released on November 2, has been postponed to November 11 due to the aftermath of the Seoul Halloween crowd crush.

On November 17, 2022, IST Entertainment announced that Jung would be holding "Travelog" solo concerts on December 10 and 11.

On April 28, 2023, IST Entertainment announced that Jung had renewed her contract with the company for the 3rd time.

On July 31, 2023, Jung was confirmed to portray the role of Lee Mijin in the JTBC series Miss Night and Day.

On August 13, 2024, Jung surpassed 1.01 billion cumulative streams on Melon, Korea's largest music streaming platform, and was named a member of the "New Billions Club - Bronze Club." On the same day, she surpassed 120,000 daily streams compared to the previous day, putting her shoulder to shoulder with the top Korean artists representing each genre.

On May 2, 2025, IST Entertainment announced that its exclusive contract with Jung had recently come to an end after 14 years. Following this, Billions also shared an official statement that they had signed an exclusive contract with her.

In 2025, Jung starred in KBS2's romantic comedy Pump Up the Healthy Love opposite Lee Jun-young. Jung released the album Summer I with the lead single "I Love love" on August 11, 2026.

== Discography ==
=== Extended plays ===
List of extended plays, showing selected details, selected chart positions, and sales figures
Title	Details	Peak chart positions			Sales
Title	Details	KOR	JPN	US World	Sales
Dream	Released: April 18, 2016; Label: Plan A Entertainment; Formats: CD, LP, digital download, streaming	3	—	13	KOR: 42,500
The Space (공간)	Released: April 10, 2017; Label: Plan A Entertainment; Formats: CD, digital download, streaming	3	89	—	KOR: 26,617; JPN: 829
Hyehwa (혜화 (暳花))	Released: October 17, 2018; Label: Plan A Entertainment; Formats: CD, digital download, streaming	3	—	—	KOR: 17,773
Simple	Released: July 15, 2020; Label: Play M Entertainment; Formats: CD, digital download, streaming	7	—	—	KOR: 26,045
Log	Released: November 11, 2022; Label: IST; Formats: CD, digital download, streaming	11	—	—	KOR: 19,331
Summer, I	Released: August 11, 2026; Label: Billions; Formats: CD, digital download, streaming	12	—	—	KOR: 12,586
"—" denotes releases that did not chart or were not released in that region.

=== Singles ===
List of singles, showing year released, selected chart positions, sales figures, and name of the album
Title	Year	Peak chart positions	Sales	Album
Title	Year	KOR Circle	Sales	Album
As lead artist
"Hopefully Sky" (하늘바라기) (featuring Hareem)	2016	1	KOR: 1,366,552	Dream
"The Spring" (너란 봄) (featuring Hareem)	2017	2	KOR: 385,942	The Space
"Being There" (어떤가요)	2018	63	—N/a	Hyehwa
"Away"	2020	108	—N/a	Simple
"Meet Him Among Them" (그 중에 그대를 만나)	2022	191	—N/a	Kim Eana Remake Project
"Journey for Myself" (나에게로 떠나는 여행)	2022	190	—N/a	Log
"I Love Love"	2026	—	—N/a	Summer, I
Collaborations
"Love Day" (with Yang Yo-seob)	2012	8	KOR: 1,604,167	A Cube for Season #Green
"A Year Ago" (일년전에) (with Kim Nam-joo and Jang Hyun-seung)	2013	13	KOR: 300,616	A Cube for Season #White
"Know We're Going to Break Up" (헤어질걸 알기에) (with Huh Gak)	2013	29	KOR: 192,124	Little Giant
"Short Hair" (짧은머리) (with Huh Gak)	2013	1	KOR: 1,207,766	A Cube for Season #Blue
"Break Up to Make Up" (이제 그만 싸우자) (with Huh Gak)	2014	1	KOR: 803,627	A Cube for Season #Sky-Blue
"Ocean" (바다) (with Huh Gak)	2016	5	KOR: 407,547	Plan A' First Episode
"Eyescream" (with Hanhae)	2016	56	KOR: 36,927	Non-album singles
"Visual Gangster" (feat. MC Mong)	2016	5	KOR: 413,072	U.F.O
"Be with Me" (같이 걸어요) (with 10cm)	2019	80	—N/a	Non-album singles
"Let You Go" (이별은 늘 그렇게) (with Huh Gak)	2019	34	—N/a	Non-album singles
"Couple" (커플) (with Seo In-guk)	2025	88	—N/a	Non-album singles

=== Soundtrack appearances ===
List of songs, showing year released, selected chart positions, sales figures, and name of the album
Title	Year	Peak chart positions	Sales	Album
Title	Year	KOR Gaon	Sales	Album
"All For You" (with Seo In-guk)	2012	1	KOR: 2,690,706	Reply 1997 OST
"Just the Way We Love" (우리 사랑 이대로) (with Seo In-guk)	2012	3	KOR: 1,428,802	Reply 1997 OST
"One Minute Ago" (1분 전) (Kang Ho-dong featuring Jung Eun-ji)	2013	—	—N/a	Barefooted Friends OST
"It's You" (그대라구요)	2014	11	KOR: 417,438	Three Days OST
"A Love Before" (사랑 앞에서)	2016	79	KOR: 27,570	Entertainer OST
"You're My Garden" (그대란 정원)	2017	— (Note: "You're My Garden" did not enter Gaon Digital Chart, but peaked at position 16 on component BGM Chart.)	—N/a	Strong Girl Bong-soon OST
"Stay With Me" (바람 불면)	2018	— (Note: "Stay With Me" did not enter Gaon Digital Chart, but peaked at position 3 on component Download Chart.)	—N/a	Suits OST
"Ppang Ppang" (빵빵) (with Dpole, Sunwoo Jung-a, Yu Seung-woo, Yoo Jae-hwan)	2019	—	—N/a	Sound of Music - The Birth of Music OST
"A Song For Memorize" (with Dpole, Sunwoo Jung-a, Yu Seung-woo, Yoo Jae-hwan)	2019	—	—N/a	Sound of Music - The Birth of Music OST
"How's Your Night" (너의 밤은 어때)	2020	41	—N/a	She's My Type OST
"To Me" (혼잣말)	2020	— (Note: "To Me" did not enter Gaon Digital Chart, but peaked at position 32 on component BGM Chart.)	—N/a	Start-Up OST Part 16
"Love Day (2021)" (with Yang Yo-seob)	2021	4	—N/a	Romance 101 OST
"A Cup of Life" (술꾼도시여자들)	2021	—	—N/a	Work Later, Drink Now OST
"Melody at First Sight"	2022	—	—N/a	Themselves OST
"Stay"	2024	—	—N/a	Miss Night and Day OST
"—" denotes releases that did not chart or were not released in that region.

=== Other charted songs ===
Title	Year	Peak chart positions	Album
Title	Year	KOR	Album
"The Reason Why I'm Beautiful" (with Ben and Jihyo)	2016	97	Popular Music Crush Pt. 1 from Inkigayo Music Crush
"Love is Like the Wind"	2016	25	Dream
"It's Okay"	2016	71	Dream
"Love is"	2016	80	Dream
"Home"	2016	87	Dream
"First Farewell" (feat Kwak Jin-eon )	2017	23	The Space
"First Love"	2017	92	The Space
"Seoul's Moon"	2017	— (Note: " Seoul's Moon " did not enter Gaon Digital Chart, but peaked at position 66 on component Download Chart.)	The Space
"Manito"	2017	— (Note: "Manito" did not enter Gaon Digital Chart, but peaked at position 81 on component Download Chart.)	Space Audi Project
"Stay"	2020	— (Note: " Stay " did not enter Gaon Digital Chart, but peaked at position146 on component BGM Chart.)	Simple
"—" denotes releases that did not chart.

=== Composition credits ===
All song credits are adapted from the Korea Music Copyright Association's database unless stated otherwise.

List of songs, showing year released, artist name, and name of the album
Title	Year	Artist	Album	Composer	Lyricist	Arranger
"Promise U" (새끼손가락)	2015	Apink	Pink Memory	Yes	Yes	Yes
"Hopefully Sky" (하늘바라기)	2016	Jung Eun-ji	Dream	Yes	Yes	Yes
"Dear (Whisper)"	2016	Apink	Dear	Yes	Yes	No
"That Spring, This Autumn" (그 봄날, 이 가을)	2016	Apink	Dear	No	Yes	No
"First Love" (소녀의 소년)	2017	Jung Eun-ji	The Space	No	Yes	No
"Moon of Seoul" (서울의 달)	2017	Jung Eun-ji	The Space	No	Yes	No
"Miracle" (기적 같은 이야기)	2018	Apink	Miracle	Yes	No	No
"For Hyehwa" (별 반짝이는 꽃을 위해)	2018	Jung Eun-ji	Hyehwa	Yes	No	Yes
"Being There" (어떤가요)	2018	Jung Eun-ji	Hyehwa	Yes	Yes	Yes
"Seasons Change" (계절이 바뀌듯)	2018	Jung Eun-ji	Hyehwa	Yes	Yes	No
"The Box" (상자)	2018	Jung Eun-ji	Hyehwa	No	Yes	No
"Thinking About You" (신경 쓰여요)	2018	Jung Eun-ji	Hyehwa	No	Yes	No
"B"	2018	Jung Eun-ji	Hyehwa	Yes	Yes	Yes
"Farewell" (김비서)	2018	Jung Eun-ji	Hyehwa	Yes	Yes	No
"Sae-byuk" (새벽)	2018	Jung Eun-ji	Hyehwa	Yes	Yes	No
"Be With Me" (같이 걸어요)	2019	Jung Eun-ji with 10cm	Non-album single	Yes	Yes	Yes
"Everybody Ready?"	2020	Apink	Look	No	Yes	No
"Simple is the Best"	2020	Jung Eun-ji	Simple	No	Yes	No
"Away"	2020	Jung Eun-ji	Simple	No	Yes	No
"Whoo" (후)	2020	Jung Eun-ji	Simple	No	Yes	No
"Stay" (두고 왔나 봐요)	2020	Jung Eun-ji	Simple	No	Yes	No
"Moisturising" (보습의 중요성)	2020	Jung Eun-ji	Simple	No	Yes	No
"A Slow Child" (느리게 가는 세상)	2020	Jung Eun-ji	Simple	Yes	Yes	No
"Dream"	2022	Apink	Horn	Yes	Yes	No

== Videography ==
=== Music videos ===
Title	Year	Director(s)	Note	Ref.
"All for You" (with Seo In-guk)	2012	—	Reply 1997 Ost	
"Love Day" (with Yang Yo-seob)	2012	—	A Cube for Season #Green	
"A Year Ago" (with Kim Nam-Joo and Jang Hyun-seung)	2013	—	A Cube for Season #White	
"Hopefully Sky"	2016	Joo Hee-sun		
"Ocean" (with Huh Gak)	2016	—		
"The Spring"	2017	Mustache Film		
"Being There"	2018	Lee Young-hoon (Daysdaze Production)		
"Stay"	2018	—	Suits Ost	
"Be with Me" (with 10cm)	2019	—	Special Clip	
"Away"	2020	BTS FILM		
"Log"	2022	—	—	
"Meet Him Among Them"	2022	—	Special Live	
"i love Love"	2026	이영훈 (NANANE STUDIO)		

== Filmography ==
=== Film ===
Year	Title	Role	Notes	Ref.
2013	Saving Santa	Shiny	Animated, Korean dubbed	
2017	My Pet Ozzy	Carrie	Animated, Korean dubbed	
2019	0.0 MHz	So Hee	Debut film	

=== Television series ===
Year	Title	Role	Notes	Ref.
2012	Reply 1997	Sung Shi-won		
2013	That Winter, the Wind Blows	Moon Hee-sun		
2013	Reply 1994	Sung Shi-won	Cameo (Episodes 16–17 & 21)	
2014	Lovers of Music	Choi Choon-hee		
2015	Cheer Up!	Kang Yeon-doo		
2017	Untouchable	Seo Yi-ra		
2020	Backstreet Rookie	Dae-Hyun's ex-girlfriend	Cameo (Episode 1)	
2022	Blind	Jo Eun-gi		
2024	Miss Night and Day	Lee Mi-jin		
2025	Pump Up the Healthy Love	Mi-ran		
2025	To the Moon	Song Hae-Ri	Cameo (Episode 1)	

=== Web series ===
Year	Title	Role	Note	Ref.
2021	Work Later, Drink Now	Kang Ji-goo	Season 1	
2022–2023	Work Later, Drink Now	Kang Ji-goo	Season 2	

=== Television show ===
Year	Title	Role	Ref.
2017	Crime Scene 3	Cast member	
2017	Law of the Jungle in New Zealand	Cast member	
2019	YOLO SOLO: Jung Eun-Ji's Sydney Sunshine	Main cast	
2019	Sound Of Music- The Birth of Music	Cast member	
2020	Friend's Song	Fixed MC	
2021	Soo Mi's Mountain Cabin	Cast member	
2022	Women in Mountain Mountaineers	Cast member	
2022	The Second World	Judge	
2024	Girls on Fire	Judge/Producer	

=== Radio show ===
Year	Title	Role	Ref.
2019–2022	Jung Eun-ji's Music Plaza	DJ	

=== Hosting ===
Year	Title	Notes	Ref.
2014	23rd Seoul Music Awards	with Seo Kyung-seok and Eunhyuk	
2014	2014 K-Pop World Festival in Changwon	with Kang Min Hyuk and KBS announcer Jo Hang Ri	
2017	2017 Lunar New Year Special Idol Star Athletics Championships	with Jun Hyun-moo and Lee Soo-geun	
2022	17th Seoul International Drama Awards	with Joo Sang-wook	

== Theatre ==
Year	Title	Role	Ref.
2012–2013	Legally Blonde	Elle Woods	
2014	Full House	Han Ji-eun	
2021	Natasha, Pierre, and the Great Comet of 1812	Natasha	

== Concerts and tours ==
=== The Attic (1st Concert) ===
Date	Country	City	Venue	Attendance	Ref
June 3, 2017	South Korea	Seoul	Ewha Womans University Samsung Hall	3,000	
June 4, 2017	South Korea	Seoul	Ewha Womans University Samsung Hall	3,000	
June 5, 2017	South Korea	Seoul	Ewha Womans University Samsung Hall	3,000	

=== Hyehwa Station (2nd Concert) ===
Date	Country	City	Venue	Ref.
October 13, 2018	South Korea	Seoul	Yonsei University Auditorium	
October 14, 2018	South Korea	Seoul	Yonsei University Auditorium	
November 3, 2018	South Korea	Daegu	Kyungpook National University Auditorium	
November 10, 2018	South Korea	Busan	KBS Busan Hall	
November 28, 2018	Japan	Tokyo	Shibuya City Cultural Center Owada	
November 29, 2018	Japan	Tokyo	Shibuya City Cultural Center Owada	
May 4, 2019	Taiwan	Taipei	Legacy MAX	
May 18, 2019	China	Hongkong	MacPherson Stadium	
May 19, 2019	China	Hongkong	MacPherson Stadium	
June 9, 2019	Singapore	Singapore	Zepp@BigBox	

=== Yeoreum (3rd Concert) ===
Date	Country	City	Venue	Attendance	Ref.
August 3, 2019	South Korea	Seoul	Sangmyung University Gyedang Hall	3,000	
August 4, 2019	South Korea	Seoul	Sangmyung University Gyedang Hall	3,000	
August 17, 2019	South Korea	Busan	Sohyang Theater Shinhan Card Hall	1,000	
September 22, 2019	Thailand	Bangkok	Show DC Ultra Arena Hall	—N/a	

=== Online Concert : How To Live (2020) ===
Date	Country	City	Venue	Ref.
July 26, 2020	South Korea	Seoul	Shinhan Card Fan Square	

=== Travelog (4th Concert) ===
Date	Country	City	Venue	Ref
December 10, 2022	South Korea	Seoul	SMTOWN COEX Artium	
December 11, 2022	South Korea	Seoul	SMTOWN COEX Artium	
January 14, 2023	Taiwan	Taipei	NTU Sport Center 1F	
February 5, 2023	China	Hong Kong	Star Hall KITEC	
October 4, 2023	China	Hong Kong	MacPherson Stadium	
October 5, 2023	China	Hong Kong	MacPherson Stadium	
October 10, 2023	Taiwan	Taipei	Taipei International Convention Center (TICC)	

=== Eunji's Bookstore (1st Fanmeeting) ===
Date	Country	City	Venue	Ref
May 25, 2024	South Korea	Seoul	Ewha Womans University Samsung Hall	
June 15, 2024	Taiwan	Taipei	NTU Sport Center 1F	
June 29, 2024	China	Hong Kong	MacPherson Stadium	
June 30, 2024	China	Hong Kong	MacPherson Stadium	
July 7, 2024	Japan	Tokyo	Hokutopia Sakura Hall	

== Awards and nominations ==
Name of the award ceremony, year presented, category, nominee of the award, and the result of the nomination
Award ceremony	Year	Category	Nominee(s) / work(s)	Result	Ref.
Asia Artist Awards	2021	Female Solo Singer Popularity Award	Jung Eun-ji	Nominated	
APAN Star Awards	2012	Best OST	Jung Eun-ji (with Seo In-guk)	Won	
APAN Star Awards	2012	Best Couple	Jung Eun-ji (with Seo In-guk)	Won	
APAN Star Awards	2012	Acting Award, Actress	Reply 1997	Nominated	
APAN Star Awards	2012	Rising Star Award	Reply 1997	Won	
APAN Star Awards	2013	Best Performance	That Winter, the Wind Blows	Won	
Baeksang Arts Awards	2013	Best New Actress – Television	Reply 1997	Won	
Brand of the Year Awards	2020	Radio DJ of the Year	Jung Eun-ji	Won	
Gaon Chart Music Awards	2013	Songs of the Year – September	"All For You" (with Seo In-guk)	Won	
KBS Drama Awards	2014	Excellence Award, Actress in a Miniseries	Lovers of Music	Nominated	
KBS Drama Awards	2014	Best New Actress	Lovers of Music	Nominated	
KBS Drama Awards	2014	Popularity Award, Actress	Lovers of Music	Won	
KBS Drama Awards	2015	Popularity Award, Actress	Cheer Up!	Nominated	
KBS Drama Awards	2025	Popularity Award, Actress	Pump Up the Healthy Love	Won	
KBS Drama Awards	2025	Best Couple Award	Jung Eun-ji (with Lee Jun-young); Pump Up the Healthy Love	Won	
KBS Drama Awards	2025	Excellence Award, Actress in a Miniseries	Pump Up The Healthy Love	Nominated	
KBS Entertainment Awards	2019	New DJ of the Year Award	Jung Eun-ji Gayo Plaza	Won	
Korea Culture and Entertainment Awards	2014	Excellence Award, Actress in a Drama	Lovers of Music	Won	
Korea Drama Awards	2012	Best Couple	Jung Eun-ji (with Seo In-guk)	Won	
Korea First Brand Awards	2019	Radio DJ	Jung Eun-ji Gayo Plaza	Won	
Korea Grand Prize Awards	2021	10 People Who Shined Korea	Jung Eun-ji	Won	
Melon Music Awards	2012	Best OST	"All For You" (with Seo In-guk)	Won	
Melon Music Awards	2014	Best OST	"It's You" Three Days	Nominated	
Melon Music Awards	2016	Best Ballad Award	"Hopefully Sky"	Won	
Melon Music Awards	2017	Top 10 Artists	Jung Eun-ji	Nominated	
Melon Music Awards	2017	Folk/Blues Song	"The Spring"	Won	
Melon Music Awards	2021	Top 10	Jung Eun-ji (with Yang Yo-seob)	Nominated	
Melon Music Awards	2021	Netizen Popularity Award	Jung Eun-ji (with Yang Yo-seob)	Nominated	
Mnet Asian Music Awards	2012	Best OST	"All For You" (with Seo In-guk)	Won	
Mnet Asian Music Awards	2014	Best Collaboration	"Break Up to Make Up" (with Huh Gak)	Nominated	
Mnet Asian Music Awards	2014	Song of the Year	"Break Up to Make Up" (with Huh Gak)	Nominated	
Mnet Asian Music Awards	2016	Artist of the Year	Jung Eun-ji	Nominated	
Mnet Asian Music Awards	2016	Best Female Artist	Jung Eun-ji	Nominated	
Mnet Asian Music Awards	2016	Best Vocal Performance Female Solo	"Hopefully Sky"	Nominated	
Mnet Asian Music Awards	2016	Song of the Year	"Hopefully Sky"	Nominated	
Mnet Asian Music Awards	2017	Best Vocal Performance Female Solo	"The Spring"	Nominated	
Mnet Asian Music Awards	2017	Qoo10 Song of the Year	"The Spring"	Nominated	
Mnet Asian Music Awards	2021	Best OST	"Love Day" (with Yang Yo-seob)	Nominated	
Mnet Asian Music Awards	2021	Song of The Year	"Love Day" (with Yang Yo-seob)	Nominated	
SBS Drama Awards	2013	Best New Actress	That Winter, the Wind Blows	Won	
SBS MTV Best of the Best	2014	Best Collaboration	"Break Up to Make Up" (with Huh Gak)	Won	
Seoul International Youth Film Festival	2014	Best Young Actress	Lovers of Music	Won	
Seoul International Youth Film Festival	2014	Best OST by a Female Artist	"It's You" Three Days	Nominated	
Seoul Music Awards	2021	Best OST	"Love Day" (with Yang Yo-seob)	Nominated	
Style Icon Awards	2012	Top 10 Style Icon	Jung Eun-ji (with Seo In-guk); Reply 1997	Won	
tvN10 Awards	2016	Best Kiss	Jung Eun-ji (with Seo In-guk); Reply 1997	Won	
tvN10 Awards	2016	Made in tvN, Actress in Drama	Jung Eun-ji (with Seo In-guk); Reply 1997	Nominated	
TVING Awards	2021	Womance of the Year	Jung Eun-ji	Won	
