= Lee Seong-jong =

South Korean singer (born 1993)

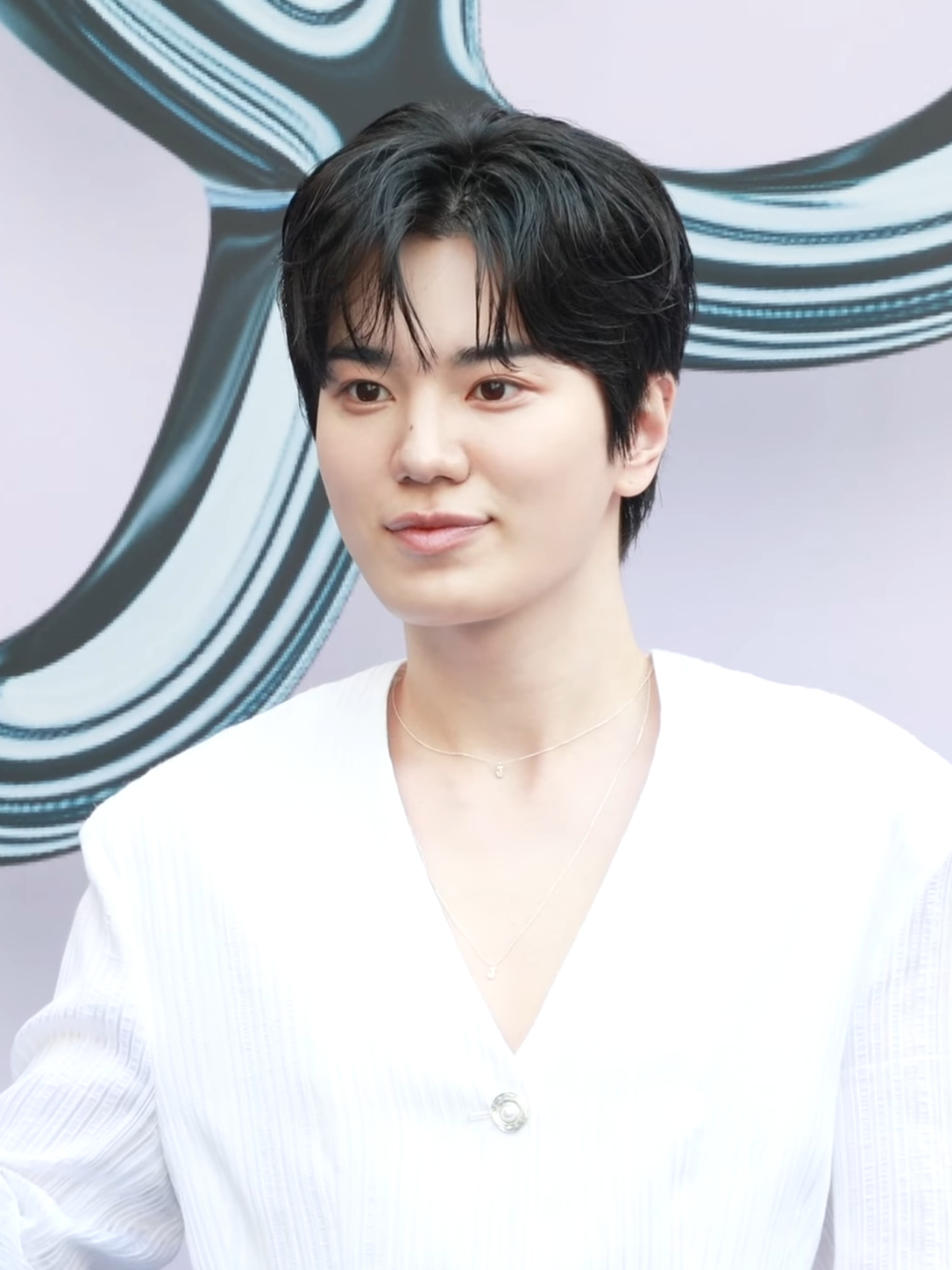
- Lee in September 2024

Background information
- Born: September 3, 1993 (age 32); Gwangju, South Korea
- Genres: K-pop; J-pop; Dance-pop; Electronic
- Occupation: Singer
- Instrument: Vocals
- Years active: 2010–present
- Labels: Woollim; SPK
- Member of: Infinite; Infinite F
- Website: Infinite

Korean name
- Hangul: 이성종
- RR: I Seongjong
- MR: I Sŏngjong

Lee Seong-jong (Korean: 이성종; born September 3, 1993), commonly known as Seongjong (formerly Sungjong), is a South Korean singer. He is a vocalist of the South Korean boy band Infinite under Woollim Entertainment. He is also the vocalist of Infinite F.

== Early life ==
Lee was born in Gwangju City, South Korea, on September 3, 1993. He moved to Andong when he was 9. He has a younger brother three years younger than him named Lee Seon-gyu. He graduated from Jeonju Arts High School on February 7, 2012, and was studying at Kongju University.

== Career ==
=== Infinite ===
Lee was first introduced as a vocalist of the boy band Infinite in 2010. His first appearance as a member was during Infinite's pre-debut reality show You Are My Oppa. The group officially debuted on June 9, 2010.

=== Infinite F ===
Lee was announced as a member of Infinite F during the One Great Step Returns encore concert, along with Sungyeol and L. There, they performed the song "My Heart is Beating". The unit released their first song "I'm Going Crazy" in Infinite's 2nd album, "Season 2". On November 19, 2014, they made their official debut in Japan with their album, "Koi No Sign" and debuted in Korea with the single album, "Azure" on December 2, 2014.

=== Solo ===
On January 24, 2022, it was announced that Lee 's contract with Woollim Entertainment has expired after he decided not to renew it.

In September 2022, Lee signed with SPK Entertainment.

On October 30, 2022, Lee held the 2022 Lee Seongjong HALLO-CON fan meeting 'WONDERLAND: HALLOWEEN'. Subsequently, he held his first solo fan meeting in Taiwan on November 18.

On February 24, 2023, it was announced that Lee would be making his official solo debut with his 1st Single Album and single of the same name, 'The One' on March 13. Pre-orders for his 1st Single Album 'The One' were held starting on March 2, 2023.

== Personal life ==
=== Military service ===
On July 29, 2019, he revealed on his Instagram that he had quietly enlisted for his mandatory military service. He enlisted on July 22 as a public service worker. His military service ended on May 8, 2021.

== Discography ==
=== Singles ===
Title	Year	Peak chart positions	Sales	Album
Title	Year	KOR	Sales	Album
As lead artist
"Love Song"	2018	—	—N/a	Top Seed
"Beside Me"	2018	—	—N/a	Mysterious Nurse OST Part.1
"The One"	2023	—	—	The One

== Filmography ==
=== Film ===
Year	Title	Role	Ref.
2022	Mother and Child Walk	Son	

=== Television series ===
Year	Title	Role	Notes	Ref.
2011	Wara Store	Himself	voice	
2011	Just Like That Show	Himself		
2018	Mysterious Nurse	Woo Hyun-woo		

=== Television shows ===
Year	Title	Role	Ref.
2014	Super Idol Chart Show	Host	
2017	Stargram Season 2	Co-host	
2018	Sales King TV	Cast member	

=== Web shows ===
Year	Title	Role	Notes	Ref.
2021	Late Night Idol	Special host		
2022	Idol Blossom	Host	Season 1–2	
2022	Cerizabeth	Special host	with Pak Se-ri	

=== Radio shows ===
Year	Title	Role	Ref.
2018	Midnight Black	DJ	
