= Nam Woo-hyun =

South Korean singer and actor (born 1991)

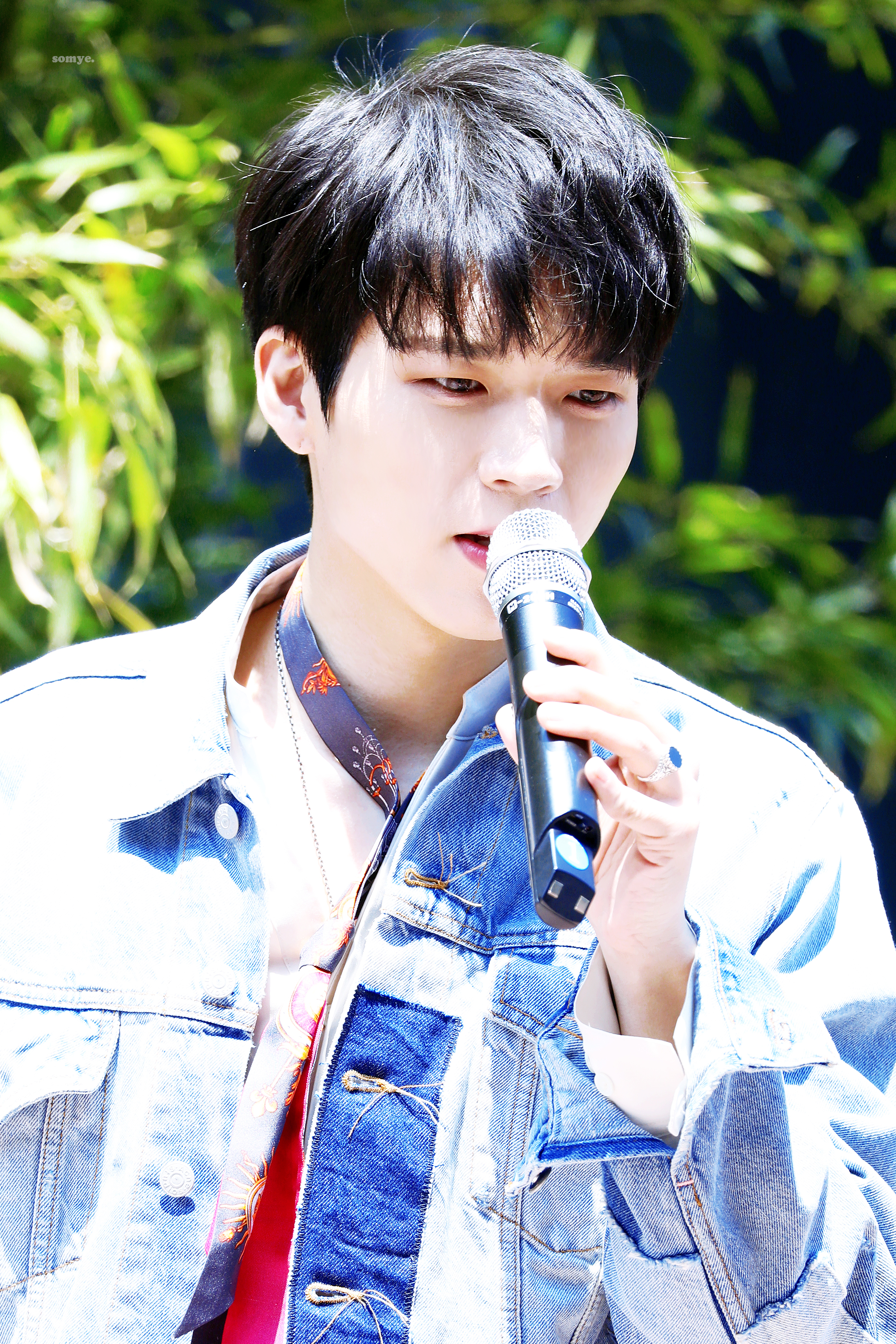
- Nam at a mini fan meeting at Show! Music Core, May 2019
- Born: February 8, 1991 (age 35); Seoul, South Korea
- Occupations: Singer; songwriter; actor
- Years active: 2010–present
- Musical career
- Genres: K-pop; Pop rock; Ballad; Dance-pop
- Instrument: Vocals
- Labels: Woollim; Billions
- Member of: Infinite; Toheart

Korean name
- Hangul: 남우현
- Hanja: 南優賢
- RR: Nam Uhyeon
- MR: Nam Uhyŏn

Nam Woo-hyun (Korean: 남우현; born February 8, 1991), known mononymously as Woohyun, is a South Korean singer, songwriter, and actor. He is a vocalist of South Korean boy group Infinite.

Nam began his solo career in 2016 with released EP Write.., which charted at number two on Gaon Album Chart and number nine on the Billboard World Albums chart. Since then, he continued to release more solo music, Second Write.. (2018), A New Journey (2019), and With (2021).

== Life and career ==
=== Early life and career beginnings ===
Nam Woo-hyun was born and raised in Seoul, South Korea. He graduated from Dong-ah Institute of Media and Arts, majoring in Applied Music. He has an older brother, Nam Boo-hyun, who is the owner of BBQ restaurant Meok & Sam.

Nam initially aspired to be a soccer player. However, he could not pursue this dream and eventually realized his dream of becoming a singer when he was in high school, and auditioned at Woollim Entertainment along with two other agencies, one of which was YG Entertainment, to pursue a career as a solo singer. He passed the audition and was accepted into Woollim with a cover of Stevie Wonder's "Lately" and began training as an idol trainee. He admitted being a little disappointed but worked hard to practice dancing instead.

Nam began his career as a model for a shopping mall alongside Beast's Junhyung and T-ara's Jiyeon. He also competed in the 6th Hello Star Contest performing Lee Hyori's "U Go Girl". In one of his first broadcast appearances, he played the lead role in KooPD's music video for Guigamalo in 2007. Later in 2009, he appeared on Mnet's Girl Punch and sang Lee Seung-gi's "Words That Are Hard to Say".

Nam officially debuted as a member of Infinite on June 9, 2010. In September 2011, Nam joined Immortal Songs 2 as a fixed member. His first performance on the show aired on October 1. On November 1, it was announced that he would be leaving the show due to Infinite's upcoming Japanese promotions, and his final episode was aired November 5. He later made two more additional appearances on the show, once by himself in January 2012 and again with group mate Sungkyu in December 2012.

=== 2012–2015: Solo activities and Toheart ===
In 2012, his career in musical theatre began with a supporting role in the musical Gwanghwamun Sonata. Nam and Sungkyu shared the role of Jiyong, the son of the female lead. The musical ran in Korea from January 3 to March 11, 2012, and in Japan from January 4 to 6, 2013. Nam made his first foray into acting in August with a minor role in the drama The Thousandth Man.

In February 2013, he released a duet song titled "Cactus" (선인장) with South Korean Indie Singer, Lucia. It is a cover of Epitone Project's song of the same, and was included as part of a special project album, Re;code.

On February 20, 2014, SM Entertainment announced the formation of a special unit, Toheart, consisting of Nam and Shinee's Key. Toheart debuted with their first mini album and title track Delicious on March 10 and made their live debut on March 12 through a MelOn Premiere Showcase. In April, Nam was cast in a lead role for the KBS drama Hi! School: Love On alongside Kim Sae-ron and group mate Lee Sung-yeol, playing the character Shin Woo-hyun. Nam released a soundtrack "When Love Comes" for SBS drama Modern Farmer on October 24, 2014. In December, Nam directed the horror short film What Happened in Hong Kong.

Nam currently plays as a striker for the South Korean celebrity football club, FC MEN. Having previously played for FC One, he was recruited to FC Men in early 2015. He made his football debut with FC Men on May 17, 2015, in a charity match against Jeju United FC.

=== 2016–present: Solo debut, military service and departure from Woollim ===
Nam debuted as a solo artist with his first EP Write.. on May 9, 2016. He made an appearance on Immortal Song, scoring 439 points, the highest score among idols in the show.

In 2017, Nam joined the sitcom titled Unusual Men and Women.

In 2018, Nam joined musical comedy I Love You, You're Perfect, Now Change in Osaka, Japan. He was also cast on a photography variety show Photo People 2, which was filmed in Tokyo and was broadcast on June 11. Nam appeared in the musical Barnum: The Greatest Showman, in Seoul, South Korea from August to October 2018.

On September 3, 2018, Nam released his second EP, Second Write... The lead single was titled "If Only You Are Fine". Nam appeared on Happy Together 4 as guest on Ep 563, and again as special MC, showing his MC-ing skills.

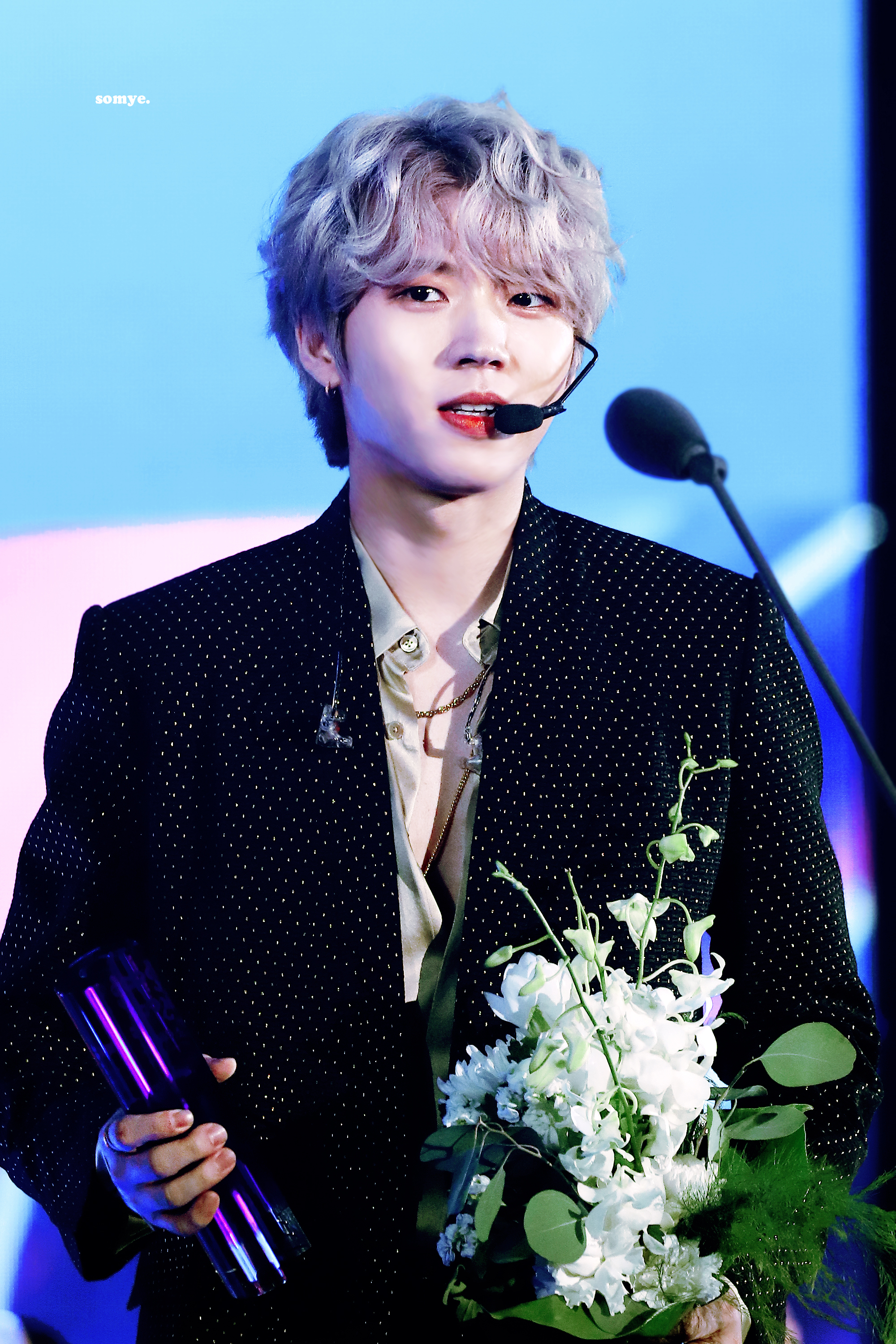
Nam at the 3rd Soribada Best K-Music Awards in August 2019

Nam held his first solo concert Arbor Day from November 2–4, 2018 at the Hannam-dong Blue Square, with all the tickets selling out in two minutes. On December 13, 2018, Nam released a solo digital single "A Song For You", which he performed in his Solo Concert.

Nam starred in the musical The Days at Bluesquare Interpark Hall in Seoul from February 22 – May 6, 2019, as Kang Moo-young, a presidential bodyguard who went missing 20 years ago along with a mysterious female companion.

On February 12, 2019, Nam joined the judging panel of TV Chosun Trot Audition Program Tomorrow's Miss Trot, a competitive survival program for female trot singers, as one of the masters. Nam went on to release his third EP A New Journey on May 7, 2019, with an Asian Concert tour from April to August. Nam also joined the musical Mefisto in a lead role from May to July 2019.

Nam enlisted in the military on October 24, 2019, fulfilling his mandatory military service as a public service worker. He released his second digital single on November 3 as a gift for fans during his military service. On August 5, 2021, he officially completed his service.

On October 19, 2021, Nam made his comeback with his fourth EP With.

On October 7, 2022, Nam became the final member of Infinite to leave Woollim Entertainment after deciding not to renew his contract, though he will still remain as a member of the group.

In March 2023, Nam signed a contract with Jflex.

In January 2024, Nam arrived in the Philippines for the filming of his upcoming movie The Guardian.

== Personal life ==
=== Health ===
In early 2023, Nam was diagnosed with a rare form of cancer, which threatened both his participation in the already-planned Infinite comeback as well as his career at all as a singer and performer. After recovering from surgery, he joined his groupmates in their promotions and concerts, eschewing the recommendation of his physician to rest. He then continued to work through his recovery preparing for the release of his first full solo album, Whitree, on November 28, and a full slate of promotions that followed.

== Discography ==
=== Studio albums ===
List of studio albums, with selected details, peak chart positions and sales
Title	Album details	Peak positions	Sales
Title	Album details	KOR	Sales
Whitree	Released: November 28, 2023; Label: Blade Entertainment, Kakao; Formats: CD, digital download	8	KOR: 53,077
2X8	Released: October 14, 2026; Label: Billions, Yul Company, Kakao; Formats: CD, digital download	8	KOR: 17,867

=== Live albums ===
List of live albums, with selected details, peak chart positions and sales
Title	Album details	Peak positions	Sales
Title	Album details	KOR	Sales
Sunshine: The Special Present for Whitree (Arbor Day 3 Live Ver.)	Released: June 25, 2024; Label: Billions, Kakao; Formats: CD, digital download	23	KOR: 16,113

=== Extended plays ===
List of EPs, with selected details, peak chart positions and sales
Title	EP details	Peak positions		Sales
Title	EP details	KOR	US World	Sales
Write..	Released: May 9, 2016; Label: Woollim, CJ E&M; Formats: CD, digital download	2	9	KOR: 83,677
Second Write..	Released: September 3, 2018; Label: Woollim, Kakao M; Formats: CD, digital download	2	—	KOR: 56,842
A New Journey	Released: May 7, 2019; Label: Woollim, Kakao M; Formats: CD, digital download	2	—	KOR: 44,629
With	Released: October 19, 2021; Label: Woollim, Kakao; Formats: CD, digital download	11	—	KOR: 29,146
Tree Ring	Released: July 30, 2025; Label: Billions, Kakao; Formats: CD, digital download	8	—	KOR: 57,623
"—" denotes releases that did not chart or were not released in that region.

=== Singles ===
List of singles, with selected peak chart positions and sales
Title	Year	Peak chart positions		Sales (DL)	Album
Title	Year	KOR Gaon	KOR Billboard	Sales (DL)	Album
"Still I Remember" (끄덕끄덕)	2016	11	—	KOR: 140,165 (Note: Accumulation of "Still I Remember" sales per month: 117,923 (May 2016), 22,242 (June 2016).)	Write..
"If Only You Are Fine" (너만 괜찮다면)	2018	92	—	—N/a	Second Write..
"A Song for You" (지금 이 노래)	2018	—	—	—N/a	Non album-single
"Hold on Me" (featuring Junoflo)	2019	—	—	—N/a	A New Journey
"When Fall Comes" (가을이 오면)	2019	—	—	—N/a	Non album-single
"Calm & Passion" (냉정과 열정 사이)	2021	— (Note: "Calm & Passion" did not enter the Gaon Digital Chart, but debuted at number 32 on the Gaon Download Chart.)	—	—N/a	With
"Baby Baby"	2023	—	—	—N/a	Whitree
"Boyfriend"	2024	—	—	—N/a	Non-album single
"Only Forward" (Only 직진)	2025	—	—	—N/a	Tree Ring
Soundtrack appearances
"When Love Comes" (사랑이 올 때)	2014	—	—	—N/a	Modern Farmer OST
"Shooting Star"	2022	—	—	—N/a	Sh**ting Stars OST
Collaborations
"Tearfully Beautiful" (눈물나게 아름다운) (as Dramatic BLUE)	2012	16	14	KOR: 217,382+	2012 SBS Gayo Daejun The Color of K-pop
"Cactus" (선인장) (with Lucia)	2013	20	16	KOR: 129,540+	Re;Code Episode II
"—" denotes releases that did not chart or were not released in that region.

=== Other charted songs ===
Title	Year	Peak chart positions		Sales (DL)	Album
Title	Year	KOR Gaon (Note: Additional reference for peak position: "Write..".)	KOR Billboard	Sales (DL)	Album
"Time" (시간아)	2011	176	—		Over the Top
"Close My Eyes" (눈을 감으면)	2014	73	99	KOR: 32,522	Season 2
"Write.."	2016	109	—	KOR: 16,798	Write..
"Passerby" (그 사람)	2016	68	—	KOR: 28,605	Write..
"Nostalgia" (향기)	2016	71	—	KOR: 28,009	Write..
"Gravity"	2016	72	—	KOR: 27,837	Write..
"Stand by Me"	2016	77	—	KOR: 26,943	Write..
"—" denotes releases that did not chart or were not released in that region.

=== Songwriting credits ===
Year	Song	Artist	Album	Lyrics		Music	
Year	Song	Artist	Album	Credited	With	Credited	With
2013	"Beautiful"	Infinite	New Challenge	Yes	—N/a	Yes	—N/a
2014	"Close My Eyes" (눈을 감으면)	Infinite	Season 2	Yes	—N/a	Yes	—N/a
2014	"Together" (함께)	Infinite	Grow OST	Yes	Lee Howon, Jang Dongwoo, Kim Sunggyu, Kim Myungsoo, Lee Sungjong, Lee Sungyeol	Yes	—N/a
2016	"Nostalgia" (향기)	Nam Woohyun	Write..	Yes	—N/a	Yes	—N/a
2016	"Gravity"	Nam Woohyun	Write..	Yes	KZ	Yes	KZ, Taebong Lee
2016	"Stand by Me"	Nam Woohyun	Write..	Yes	Conan (Rocoberry)	Yes	Conan (Rocoberry)
2016	"Everyday"	Nam Woohyun	Write..	Yes	KZ	Yes	KZ, Taebong Lee
2018	"If Only You Are Fine" (너만 괜찮다면)	Nam Woohyun	Second Write..	Yes	7six9 music	Yes	7six9 music
2018	"You're My Lady"	Nam Woohyun	Second Write..	Yes	Butterfly4, Butterfly1	Yes	Butterfly1, Butterfly4
2018	"I Love You" (사랑해)	Nam Woohyun	Second Write..	Yes	—N/a	Yes	KZ, Taebong Lee
2019	"Hold on Me" (feat. Junoflo)	Nam Woohyun	A New Journey	Yes	Junoflo	No	—N/a
2019	"Rain"	Nam Woohyun	A New Journey	Yes	—N/a	No	—N/a
2019	"Stranger"	Nam Woohyun	A New Journey	Yes	—N/a	Yes	HSND, Han Gang, Shin Jae-yeong, Jo Michelle, Adrian Mc-kinnon, Galaxy
2019	"Flower"	Nam Woohyun	A New Journey	Yes	—N/a	Yes	Jerry.L
2019	"When Fall Comes" (가을이 오면)	Nam Woohyun	Non-album single	Yes	—N/a	Yes	Jeong Kuhyeon
2021	"Calm & Passion" (냉정과 열정 사이)	Nam Woohyun	With	Yes	twlv, The Need	No	—N/a
2021	"Alone"	Nam Woohyun	With	Yes	—N/a	No	—N/a
2021	"A Song for You"	Nam Woohyun	With	Yes	Jerry Carrot	Yes	Jerry Carrot, Kim Jaejong

== Filmography ==
=== Film ===
Year	Title	Role	Ref.
2026	The Guardian	Park Do-jun	

=== Television series ===
Year	Title	Role	Notes	Ref.
2011	Wara Store	Himself	Voice role	
2012	The Thousandth man	Nam Woo-hyun		
2014	Hi! School: Love On	Shin Woo-hyun		
2026	Boyfriend on Demand	Nam Woo-hyun	Cameo - Episode 8	

=== Television shows ===
Year	Title	Role	Notes	Ref.
2018	The King of Mask Singer	Contestant	Panelist	
2019	Tomorrow's Miss Trot	Judge	Season 1	
2023	Miss Universe Philippines 2023	Performer		
2024–2025	The Gentlemen's League 3	Cast member		
2025	The Gentlemen's League 4	Cast member		

=== Web shows ===
Year	Title	Role	Notes	Ref.
2018	Photo People	Cast Member	Season 2	
2021	Midnight Idol	Special host		

== Theatre ==
Year	Title	Role	Notes/Ref.
2012	Gwanghwamun Sonata	Ji-young (Main role)	Reprised role again in Japan from January 4 to 6, 2013.
2018	I Love You, You're Perfect, Now Change	Lead role	Japanese Musical (Osaka from May 17 to 20, Tokyo from August 12 to 16)
2018	Barnum: The Greatest Showman	Amos Scudder (Main role)	Large Scale Musical from August 9 to September 29, 2018
2018–2019	The Days	Moo-young (Lead role)	Large Scale Musical. Busan from Dec 24 to 25, Seoul from Feb 22 to May 6. Also to perform in Daegu, Jinji and Iksan.
2019	Mefisto	Mefisto (Lead role)	Kwanglim Arts Center's BBCH Hall in Seoul from May 25 to July 28.
2021–2022	Jack the Ripper	Daniel	
2022	Sandglass	Woo-seok	
2024–2025	Bloody Love	Dimitru	KEPCO Art Center in Seoul from December 6, 2024, to February 16, 2025
2025–2026	Sugar	Joe / Josephine	A romantic saxophonist who cross-dresses and joins an all-female band to hide from mobsters after witnessing a gang murder. The production ran in Seoul from December 12, 2025, to February 22, 2026, followed by regional tour stops in Cheongju and Busan.

== Concerts and tours ==
=== Concert tour ===
Arbor Day

City	Venue	Date	Year
Seoul, South Korea	Blue Square iMarket Hall	November 2, 3 and 4	2018
Taipei, Taiwan	TICC	April 27	2019
Macau	Broadway Theatre, Broadway Macau	June 2	2019

Arbor Day 2

City	Venue	Date	Year
Seoul, South Korea	Jamsil Student Gymnasium	August 10 and 11	2019
Tokyo, Japan	Toyosu PIT	September 19 and 20	2019

Arbor Day 3 - Whitree

City	Venue	Date	Year
Seoul, South Korea	Jamsil Student Gymnasium	December 30 and 31	2023
Osaka, Japan	Zepp Namba	January 25	2024
Tokyo, Japan	Zepp Haneda	January 27	2024
Taipei, Taiwan	NTU Sports Center	February 3	2024
Hong Kong	Macpherson Stadium	February 17 and 18	2024

Arbor Day 4 - Tree World

City	Venue	Date	Year
Seoul, South Korea	Olympic Hall	September 21 and 22	2024
Taipei, Taiwan	NTU Sports Center	October 5	2024
Hong Kong	Macpherson Stadium	October 12 and 13	2024
Kuala Lumpur, Malaysia	Ex-8	October 26	2024

Arbor Day 5 - 나무高: Tree High School

City	Venue	Date	Year
Seoul, South Korea	Olympic Hall	August 16 and 17	2025
Macau	Broadway Theatre	September 14	2025
Taipei, Taiwan	TICC (Taipei International Convention Center)	October 19	2025
Kuala Lumpur, Malaysia	Zepp KL	October 25	2025
Manila, Philippines	Samsung Hall	November 15	2025
Hong Kong	Macpherson Stadium	November 22 and 23	2025

=== Fan meeting ===
City	Venue	Date	Year
Seoul, South Korea	KBS Arena	October 19	2019
Seoul, South Korea	KBS Arena	January 22–23	2022
Seoul, South Korea	Blue Square Master Card Hall	February 3–5	2023

== Awards and nominations ==
=== Golden Disc Awards ===
Year	Nominee / work	Award	Result
2017	Write..	Disc Bonsang Award	Nominated

=== Soribada Best K-Music Awards ===
Year	Nominee / work	Award	Result
2019	A New Journey	Male Popularity Award	Nominated
2019	A New Journey	Art-Tainer Award	Won
