= List of Gaon Album Chart number ones of 2012 =

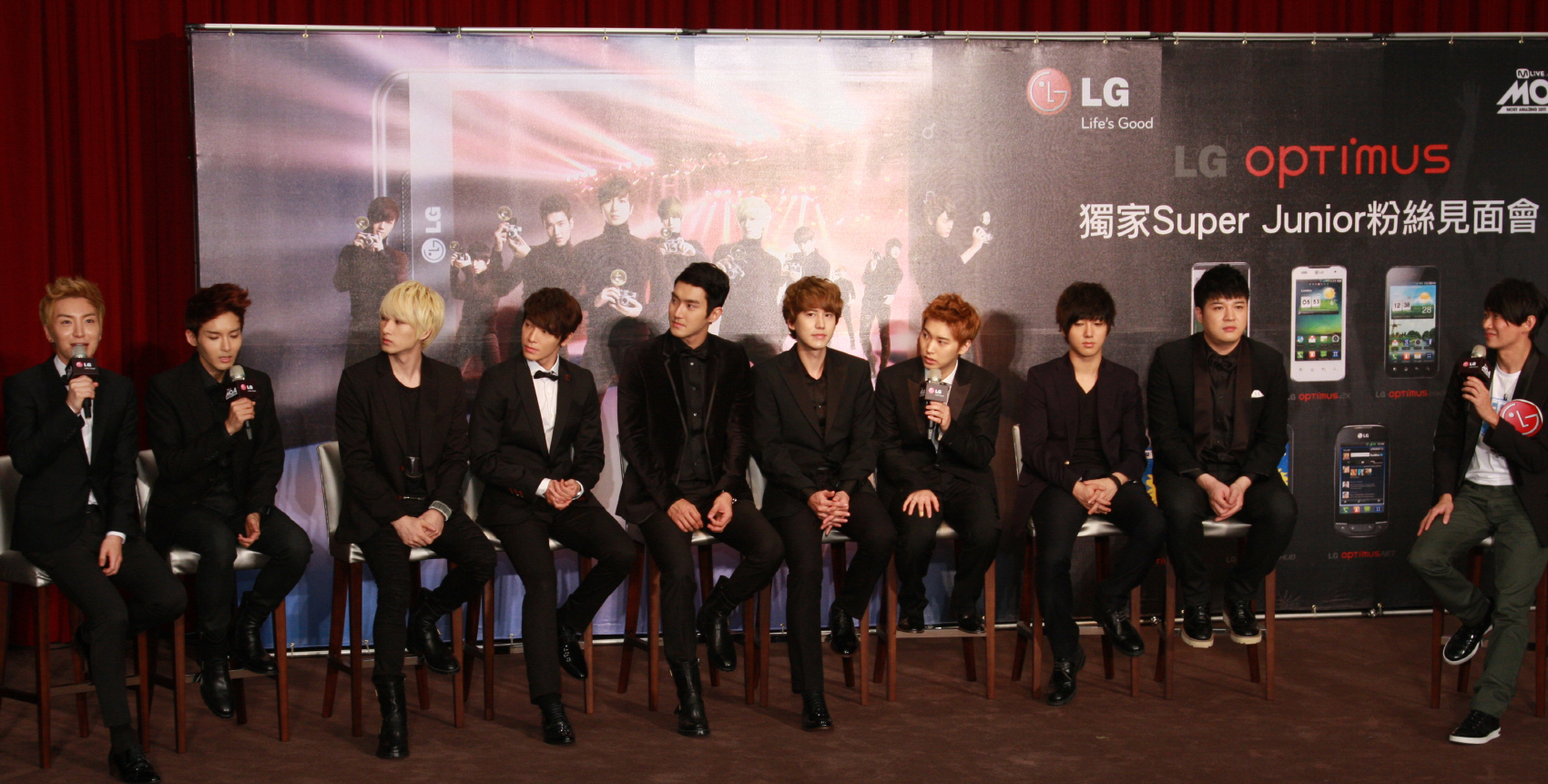
Super Junior's Sexy, Free & Single album was Gaon's best selling album of 2012.

The Gaon Album Chart is a record chart that ranks the best-selling albums and EPs in South Korea. It is part of the Gaon Music Chart which launched in February 2010. The data for the chart is compiled by the Ministry of Culture, Sports and Tourism and the Korean Music Content Industry Association based on weekly and monthly physical album sales by major distributors such as LOEN Entertainment, KT Music, Sony Music Korea, Warner Music Korea, Universal Music and Mnet Media.

Overall, Super Junior's Sexy, Free & Single was Gaon's best selling album of 2012, selling 356,431 copies.

== Weekly charts ==
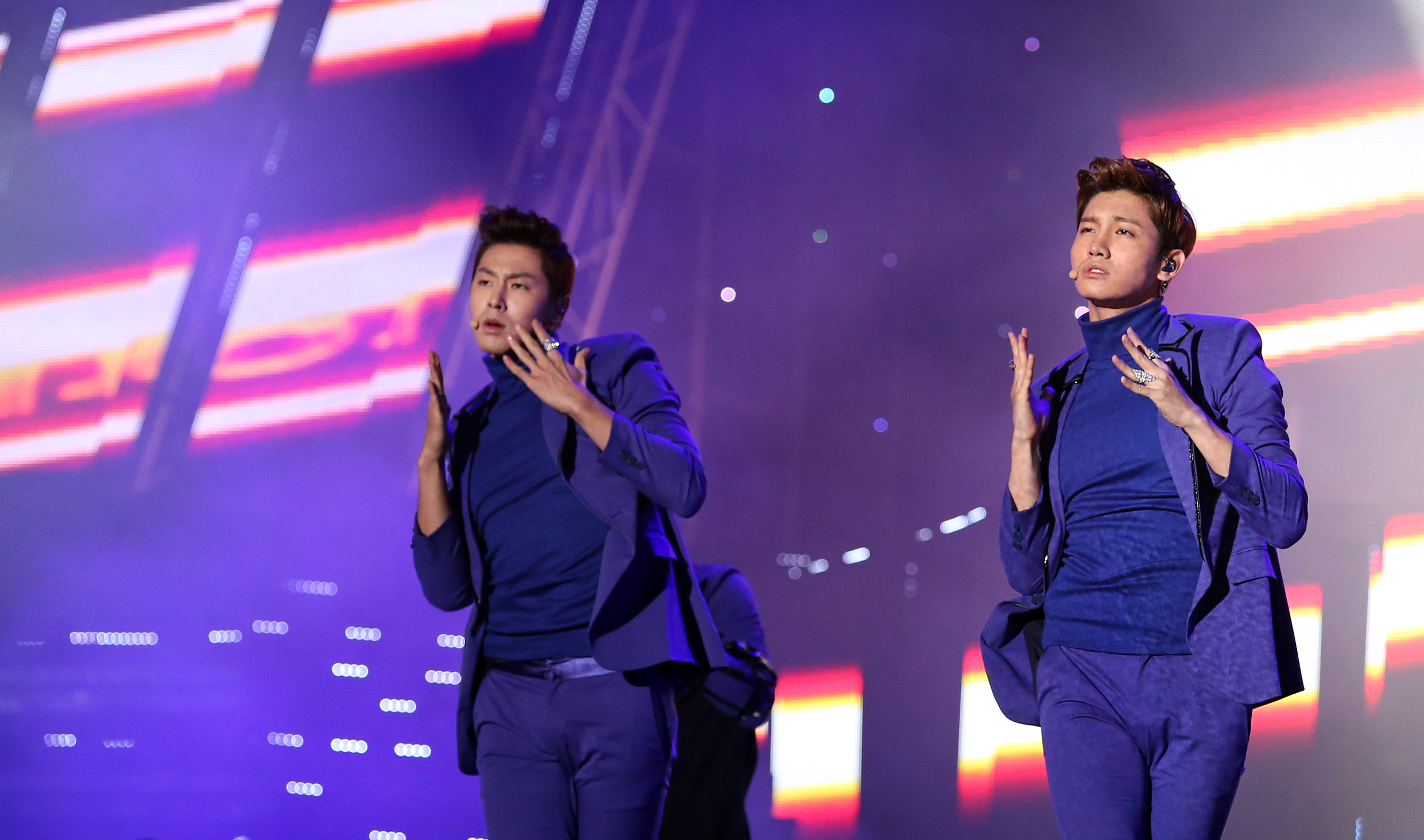
TVXQ topped the weekly album chart seven times in 2012, more than any other act.

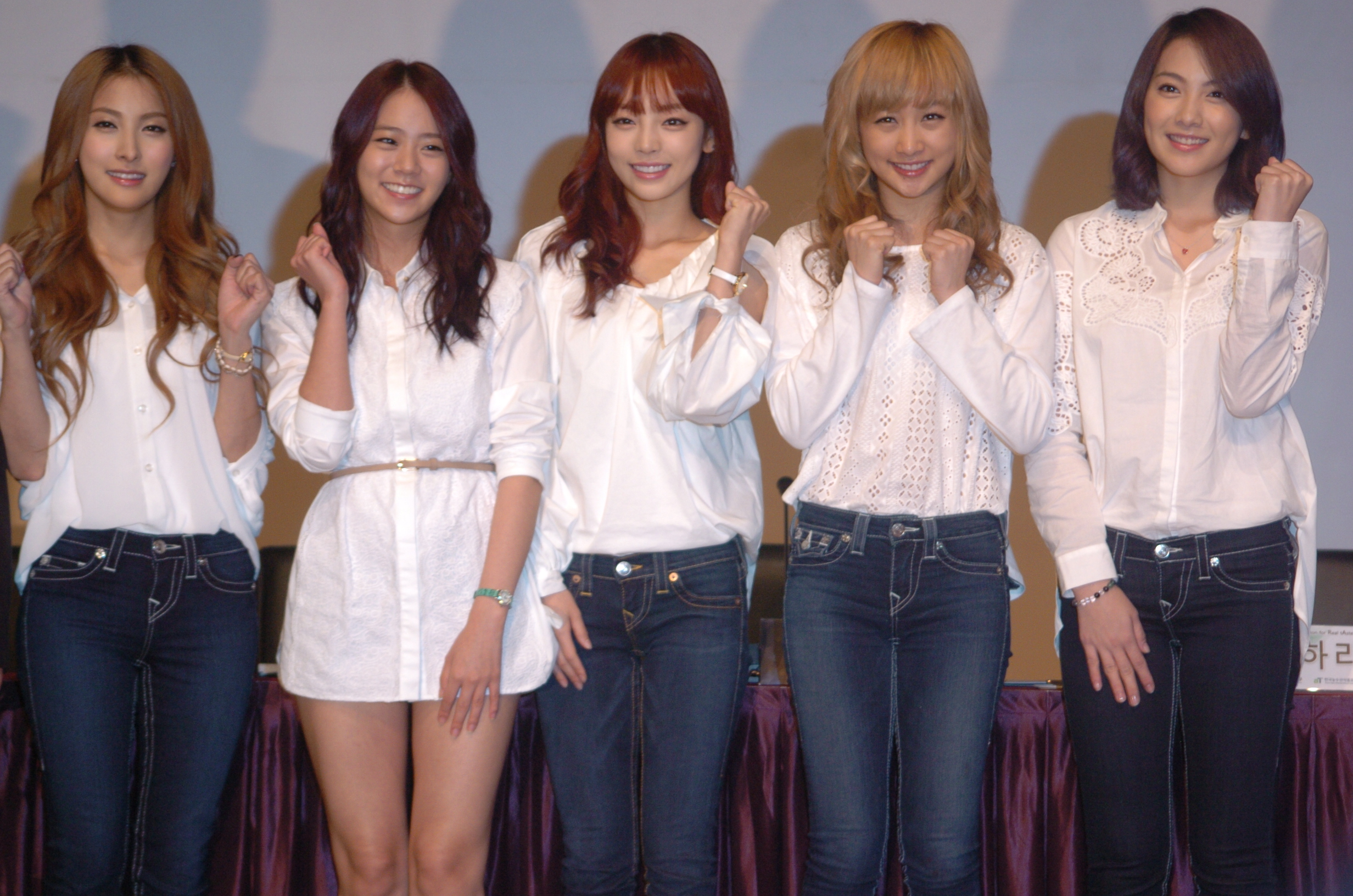
Kara was the only girl group to top the weekly album chart for more than one week in 2012.

Week	Album	Artist	Ref.
December 31, 2011 (Note: This week was counted as the first week of 2012 by Gaon Music Chart.)	Embrace	Shin Hye-sung	
January 7	Dynamic Duo 6th Digilog 2/2	Dynamic Duo	
January 14	100% Ver	MBLAQ	
January 21	Funky Town	T-ara	
January 28	Hit U	Dal Shabet	
February 4	Grown-Up	F.T. Island	
February 11	New Breed	Jay Park	
February 18	Grown-Up	F.T. Island	
February 25	New Breed	Jay Park	
March 3	Alive	Big Bang	
March 10	Alive	Big Bang	
March 17	F.Scott Fitzgerald's Way Of Love	2AM	
March 24	Sherlock	Shinee	
March 31	Ear Fun	CNBlue	
April 7	Busker Busker 1st Album	Busker Busker	
April 14	Mama	Exo-K	
April 21	Slip Away	Nell	
April 28	Volume Up	4Minute	
May 5	Twinkle	Girls' Generation-TTS	
May 12	Mama	Exo-K	
May 19	Tarantallegra	Xia	
May 26	2PM Member's Selection	2PM	
June 2	Ignition: Special Edition	B1A4	
June 9	Still Alive	Big Bang	
June 16	Electric Shock	f(x)	
June 23	Busker Busker 1st Wrap Up Album	Busker Busker	
June 30	I'm Da One	Jo Kwon	
July 7	Sexy, Free & Single	Super Junior	
July 14	Sexy, Free & Single	Super Junior	
July 21	Sexy, Free & Single	Super Junior	
July 28	Midnight Sun	Beast	
August 4	Midnight Sun	Beast	
August 11	Spy	Super Junior	
August 18	Paparazzi	Girls' Generation	
August 25	Pandora	Kara	
September 1	Uncommitted	Xia	
September 8	Pandora	Kara	
September 15	Five Treasure Box	F.T. Island	
September 22	One of a Kind	G-Dragon	
September 29	Catch Me	TVXQ	
October 6	Catch Me	TVXQ	
October 13	Catch Me	TVXQ	
October 20	Psy 6 (Six Rules), Part 1	Psy	
October 27	Catch Me	TVXQ	
November 3	02	Urban Zakapa	
November 10	Blockbuster	Block B	
November 17	In the Wind	B1A4	
November 24	Another Me	Kim Sung-kyu	
December 1	Humanoids	TVXQ	
December 8	Winter Poetry	Shin Hye-sung	
December 15	Humanoids	TVXQ	
December 22	Humanoids	TVXQ	

== Monthly charts ==
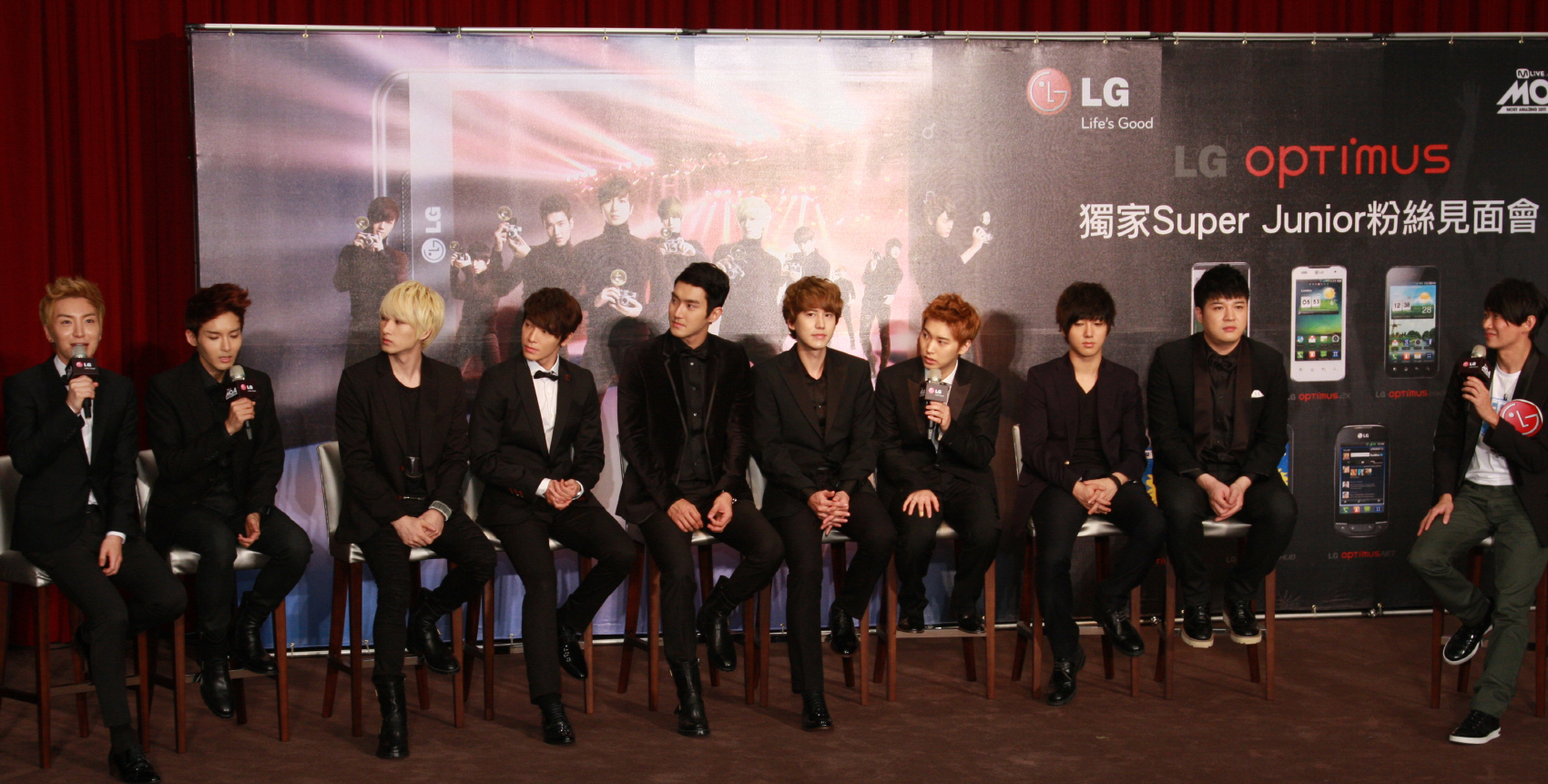
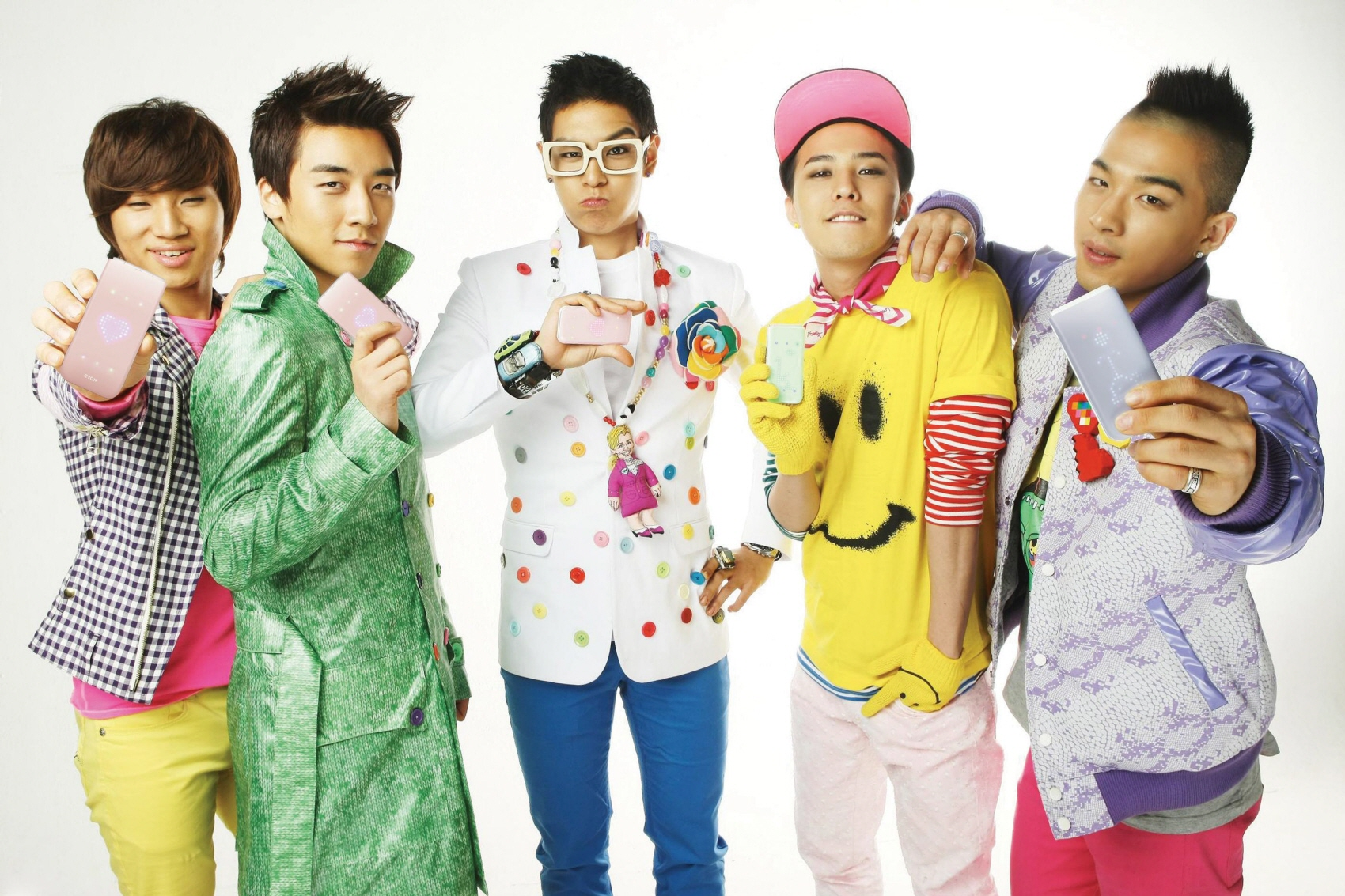
Super Junior (top) and Big Bang (bottom) both had two monthly number-one albums, more than any other act.

Month	Album	Artist	Sales
January	100% Ver.	MBLAQ	51,087
February	Alive	Big Bang	212,010
March	Sherlock	Shinee	135,370
April	Mama	Exo-K	61,333
May	Twinkle	Girls' Generation-TTS	139,388
June	Still Alive	Big Bang	117,929
July	Sexy, Free & Single	Super Junior	335,744
August	Spy	Super Junior	107,656
September	One of a Kind	G-Dragon	171,512
October	Catch Me	TVXQ	114,956
November	Another Me	Kim Sung-kyu	62,958
December	Winter Poetry	Shin Hye-sung	24,102
