= Jang Dong-woo =

South Korean singer (born 1990)

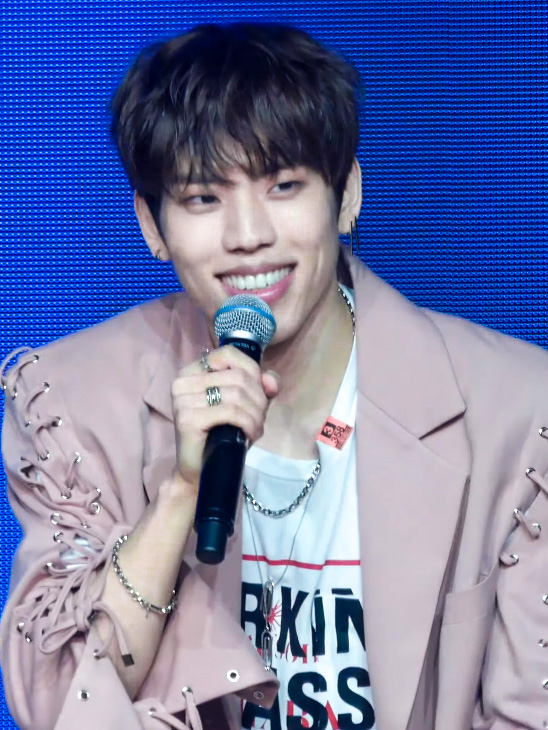
- Dongwoo at an album showcase for Bye, March 2019
- Born: November 22, 1990 (age 35); Guri, Gyeonggi Province, South Korea
- Occupations: Singer; rapper; dancer
- Agent: Big Boss Entertainment
- Musical career
- Genres: K-pop; dance-pop; R&B
- Instrument: Vocals
- Years active: 2010–present
- Label: Woollim
- Member of: Infinite; Infinite H

Korean name
- Hangul: 장동우
- RR: Jang Dongu
- MR: Chang Tongu

Jang Dong-woo (Korean: 장동우; born November 22, 1990), commonly known as Dongwoo, is a South Korean singer, rapper, and dancer. He is the rapper of South Korean boy band Infinite and its sub-unit Infinite H.

== Biography ==
Jang Dong-woo was born in Guri, Gyeonggi Province, South Korea. He was trained under JYP Entertainment for years. He is a former schoolmate of Exo member Xiumin. Prior to their debut with Infinite, he and Hoya performed as a back-up dancer for various music promotion show Epik High's Run.

On February 15, 2013 Dongwoo graduated from Daekyeung University's Practical Music program. He along with members Sunggyu, Hoya, Sungyeol and L, received the 'Proud Daekyung University Student award'.

On September 2, 2016, it was announced that Dongwoo's father had died from a chronic illness.

== Career ==
=== 2010–2014: Early career ===
Dongwoo debuted as a member of South Korean boy group Infinite in 2010. The group officially debuted on June 9, 2010.

In September 2012, Dongwoo, along with Infinite member Hoya, formed a sub-unit called Infinite H, releasing their first extended play titled Fly High in early-2013. The sub-unit has a different musical direction and style concept from Infinite, placing their focus on each member's rap and performances ability.

In January 2012, he was featured in Baby Soul and Yoo Ji-a single, "She Is a Flirt". The same year he performed with Sunggyu and Baby Soul on Immortal Songs 2 for the song "Woman On the Beach".

In August 2013, he and Hoya starred in Tasty's "Mamama" music video. The duo contributed to the lyrics of the song.

In November 2014, he featured on Nicole's extended play First Romance, track titled "7-2-Misunderstanding".

=== 2015–present: Solo activities ===
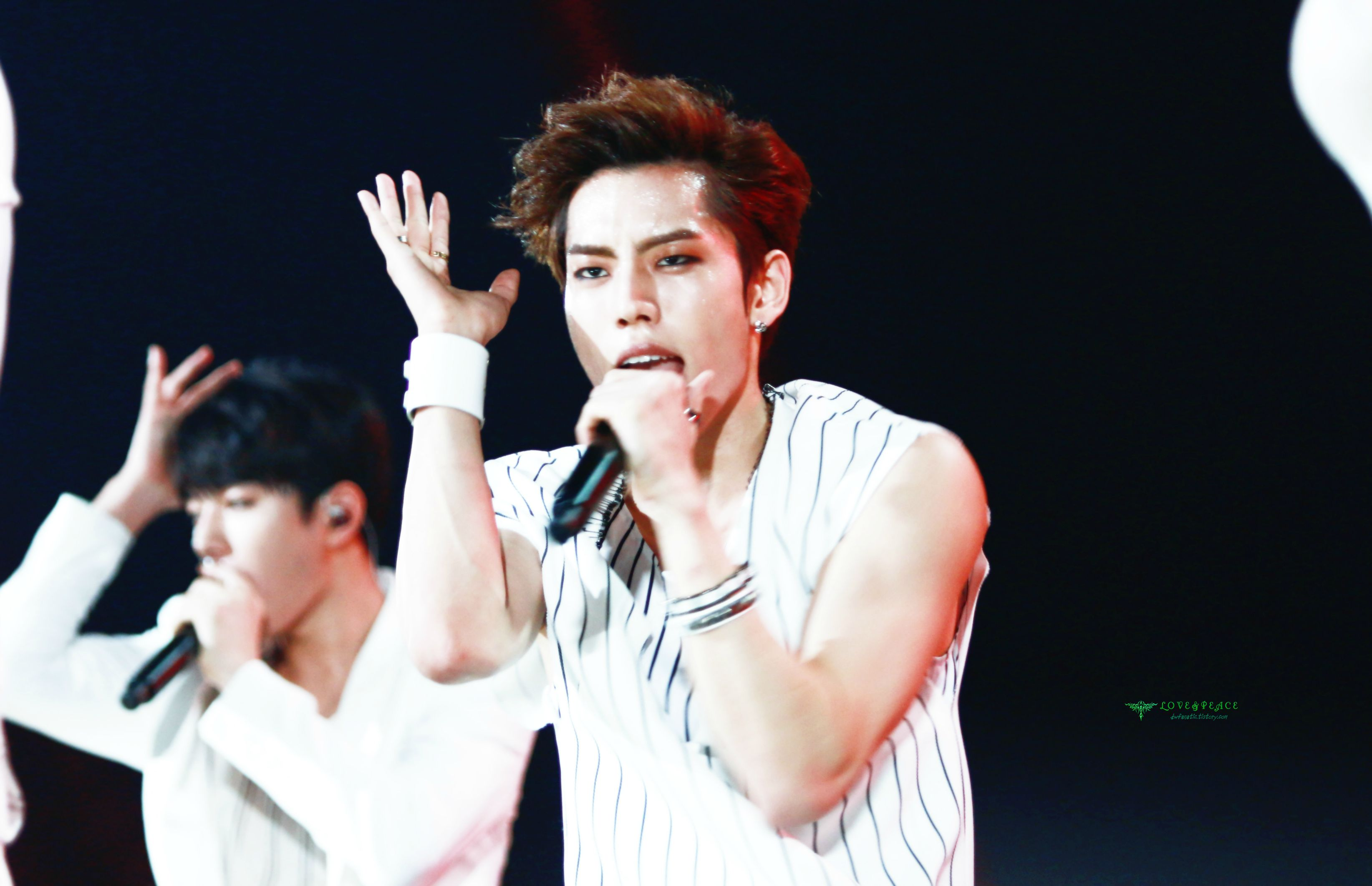
Dongwoo at KCON 2015 in Japan

Dongwoo made his debut as a musical actor, in the musical In The Heights. Dongwoo plays the role of main lead "Usnavi" along with Yang Dong-geun, Jung Won-young and Key. The musical was produced by SM C&C and ran from September 4 to November 22 at 'Blue Square'. In 2015, he along with B1A4's Baro featured in Ami's track Sick to the Bone.

In October 2016, he released his first self-produced song with vocals featured by Yoon So-yoon, titled "Embedded in Mind". The song was for webtoon Lookism.

Dongwoo released his first solo EP Bye on March 4, 2019, which contains seven-tracks including the title track called "News". A showcase was held at Seoul's Ilji Art Hall in the same day of the EP release.

On April 15, 2019, Dongwoo enlisted for his mandatory military service, serving as an active duty soldier.

He completed his military service on November 15, 2020.

On March 31, 2021, Dongwoo departed from Woollim after his contract expired.

On October 1, 2021, Dongwoo signed an exclusive contract with Big Boss Entertainment.

== Discography ==
=== Extended plays ===
Title	Album details	Peak chart positions	Sales
Title	Album details	KOR	Sales
Bye	Released: March 4, 2019; Label: Woollim Entertainment, Kakao M; Formats: CD, digital download, streaming	7	KOR: 13,907
Awake	Released: November 18, 2025; Label: MachD, Kakao M; Formats: CD, digital download, streaming	13	KOR: 13,748

==== As lead artist ====
Title	Year	Peak chart positions		Sales	Album
Title	Year	KOR Down.	KOR Billboard	Sales	Album
As lead artist
"Embedded in Mind" (마음에 묻다) (featuring Yoon So-yoon)	2016	71	—	KOR: 42, 070+	Non album-single
"TGIF"	2018	—	—	—N/a	Top Seed
"News"	2019	155	—	—N/a	Bye
"I AM"	2019	—	—	—N/a	Bye
"GUN"	2019	—	—	—N/a	Bye
"ROMEO"	2019	—	—	—N/a	Bye
"Party Girl"	2019	—	—	—N/a	Bye
"PERFECT"	2019	—	—	—N/a	Bye
"Something Between"	2019	—	—	—N/a	Bye
"Sway (Zzz)"	2025	120	—	—N/a	Awake
As featured artist
"She's a Flirt" (그녀는 바람둥이야) (Baby Soul and Yoo Ji-a featuring Dongwoo) (Note: The re-recorded version by Baby Soul and Kei of the song is also included in Girls' Invasion and Hi~.)	2012	—	—	—N/a	Non album-single
"7-2-Misunderstanding" (7-2-오해) (Nicole Jung featuring Dongwoo)	2014	—	—	—N/a	First Romance
"Hurts Down to Bones" (뼛속까지 아파) (Ami featuring Baro and Dongwoo)	2015	—	—	—N/a	Non album-single
"What Did I Say" (뭐랬어) (Kim Sung-kyu featuring Dongwoo)	2018	—	—	—N/a	Kim Sungkyu 1st Solo Concert Live – Shine
"I Swear" (Nam Woo-hyun featuring Dongwoo)	2018	—	—	—N/a	Second Write..

=== Songwriting credits ===
Year	Song	Album
2013	"Mamama" (as co-lyricist)	Spectacular
2014	"Last Romeo" (as co-lyricist)	Season 2
2014	"Alone" (as co-lyricist)	Season 2
2015	"Pretty" (as co-lyricist)	Fly Again
2015	"Aren't You Going Somewhere?" (as co-lyricist)	Fly Again
2015	"Bump" (as co-lyricist)	Fly Again
2015	"Sorry I'm Busy" (as co-lyricist)	Fly Again
2015	"Footsteps" (as co-lyricist)	Reality
2015	"Between Me and You" (as co-lyricist)	Reality
2015	"Take Care of the Ending" (as co-lyricist)	Reality
2016	"One Day" (as co-lyricist)	Infinite Only
2016	"True Love" (Rap making with Hoya)	Infinite Only
2016	"Zero" (Rap making with Hoya)	Infinite Only
2016	"Embedded in Mind" (featuring Yoon So-yoon)	Non-album single
2018	TGIF (as co-lyricist & composer)	Top Seed
2018	Pray (Maetal's Sorrow) (rap lyrics)	Top Seed

== Filmography ==
=== Television series ===
Year	Title	Role
2011	Wara Store	Himself (voice)

== Musical ==
Year	Title	Role	Ref.
2015–2017	In the Heights	Usnavi	
2018	Altar Boyz	Luke	
2018	Iron Mask	Louis XIV	
2022	Another oh Haeyoung	park Dokyung	
2022	Yeodo	Danjong	
2023	Dream High	Jin-gook	
