= Jang Do-yoon =

South Korean actor (born 1995)

- 장도윤
- Born: Jang Doyoon; August 31, 1995 (age 31); Busan, South Korea
- Occupation: Actor
- Years active: 2013–present
- Agent: JB Entertainment (2013–present)

Korean name
- Hangul: 장도윤
- RR: Jang Doyun
- MR: Chang Toyun

Jang Do-yoon (Korean: 장도윤, born August 31, 1995) is a South Korean actor. He made his acting debut in the 2013 drama special Happy! Rose Day. His fans are called "Doflowers" or "도바라기" which combines the words "Doyoon" and "Sunflower".

== Early life ==
Doyoon went to Namsan High School in Busan before he moved to Seoul in 2011. After moving, he transferred to School of Performing Arts Seoul (SOPA), where he later graduated on February 13, 2014.

=== 2011: Pledis Boys ===
Doyoon was a trainee under Pledis Entertainment for 3 years, where he was an original Pledis Boy (a name given to the male trainees officially shown). The group of boys, which included members who would later join Nu'est and Seventeen, commonly appeared with their female label mates in their promotions, including Ceci Magazine and their SBS Gayo Daejeon stage. They also appeared in Happy Pledis', the name used when Pledis artists promote as a whole, video for "Love Letter", and promoted the song with Happy Pledis on Music Core.

=== 2012: Tempest ===
In 2012, Pledis Boys was split into two groups, Nu'est (JR, Aron, Minhyun, Ren, & Baekho) and Tempest (Doyoon, Seungcheol, & Yusang), with both groups to debut in 2012. Tempest gained two new members, Jihun and Youngwon, and were put on the backburner as Nu'est was promoted more heavily. Pledis Boys as a whole released a limited magazine entitled "Pledis Boys Magazine". Nu'est debuted a week after the magazine's release, while Tempest went through lineup changes. Members Yusang and Youngwon departed, leaving Doyoon, Seungcheol, & Jihun. Tempest's plans were scrapped and the three were sent back to trainee status.

During the year, Doyoon appeared in multiple videos for his labelmates, including the debut music video of Nu'est and Hello Venus' debut teaser and debut music video.

After the scrapping of Tempest, Pledis released plans for a new boy group entitled "Seventeen". Initially, they were to debut by the end of the year with 17 members that had an average age of 17. The group would promote in South Korea, China, and Japan at the same time in 3 sub groups. After only a few months, the group's debut was pushed back to 2013. No member info was released, though fans speculated that the 3 members from the old Tempest were set to debut in the group.

Instead of debuting as official artists, Seventeen opened a web stream called "17tv" on ustream, showing the growth and training of the 11 possible members. Jihun was the only Tempest member to take part in the debut episode on December 24.

=== 2013: Seventeen TV and acting debut ===
After making a guest appearance on an early episode, Doyoon, with Seungcheol, joined the lineup of possible Seventeen members when the second season of 17tv began in March 2013. He stayed on the show and took part in all of the activities of Seventeen, including multiple "shows" or concerts at the end of each season.

In August, it was announced that Doyoon had got a small role on the drama special Happy! Rose Day, marking his acting debut. He gained attention from the drama's audience for his good looks.

In December, Doyoon, with several other Seventeen members, appeared as back up dancers on SBS Gayo Daejun for label mate Hello Venus.

=== 2014: Departure from Pledis and focus on acting ===
Doyoon's last appearance with Seventeen was in a YouTube video, released on March 14, or White's Day. Following activity on Facebook, the creation of an Instagram account, and no appearances in Seventeen's few activities, fans began to speculate his departure.

On July 17, Doyoon was removed from the official Seventeen website, officially announcing his departure. Neither Pledis nor Doyoon commented or officially announced the departure.

On October 14, Doyoon posted a photo to his official Facebook revealing his casting in the upcoming movie Hiya. Originally planned for release in 2014, the movie was later pushed back to 2016. This was his first role since his debut over one year earlier. After the announcement of his role, fans began to believe that Doyoon had signed to Woollim Entertainment due to singer Hoya's role in the film and an online roleplay account that was mistaken for the real Doyoon.

On December 2, Doyoon opened his official fancafe. With the cafe, it was revealed that he had signed to acting agency JB Entertainment.

=== 2015–present ===
After filming Hiya, Doyoon gained a supporting role in the morning drama A Bird That Doesn't Sing as the main character's son. Due to his constant appearances in both main and subplots, Doyoon became more popular. With Choa and Way of Crayon Pop, Doyoon starred in the music video for "Road" by Bear Planet, the composer for Crayon Pop. He also started appearing in All About My Mom and The Promise. He was also announced to be in the upcoming movie Because I Love You.

In January, it was confirmed Hiya would be released in March. The film was released on March 4, 2016. Doyoon played the main role of Dokko Mo Ran in the drama adaptation of the popular webtoon Flower Family.

== Filmography ==
=== Television series ===
		Support Role	Notes/Ref.
2013	KBS Drama Special – "Happy! Rose Day"	Jin-ho	One-episode special
2015	A Bird That Doesn't Sing	Oh Min-ki	
2015-2016	All About My Mom	Park Seung-wan	
2016	The Promise	young Park Hwi-kyung	
2016	Flower Family	Dokgo Mo-ran	
2021	My Sweet Dear	Ye-jun	web series
2023	Sing My Crush	Han Ba-ram	

=== Film ===
Year	Title	Role	Notes
2016	Hiya	Ho-won	
2017	Because I Love You	Joseph	

=== Music video appearances ===
Year	Title	Artist	Notes/Ref.
2011	Love Letter	Happy Pledis	Original
2012	Love Letter	Happy Pledis	Special Pledis Boys version
2012	Face	Nu'est	
2012	Hello	Hello Venus	Group teaser
2012	Venus	Hello Venus	
2015	Road	Bear Planet	
2022	"Rain Cloud"	Ryu Jeong-woon	

=== Music shows ===
Year	Show	Song	Artist	Notes
2011	Music Core	Love Letter	Happy Pledis	Backup dancer
2011	SBS Gayo Daejun	Party Rock Anthem	After School	Dancer
2013	SBS Gayo Daejun	Would You Like Some Tea	Hello Venus	Backup dancer

=== Television show ===
Year	Title	Role	Notes
2016–present	Saturday Night Live Korea	Himself	Cast Members
