= Kim Sung-kyu =

South Korean singer-songwriter and actor

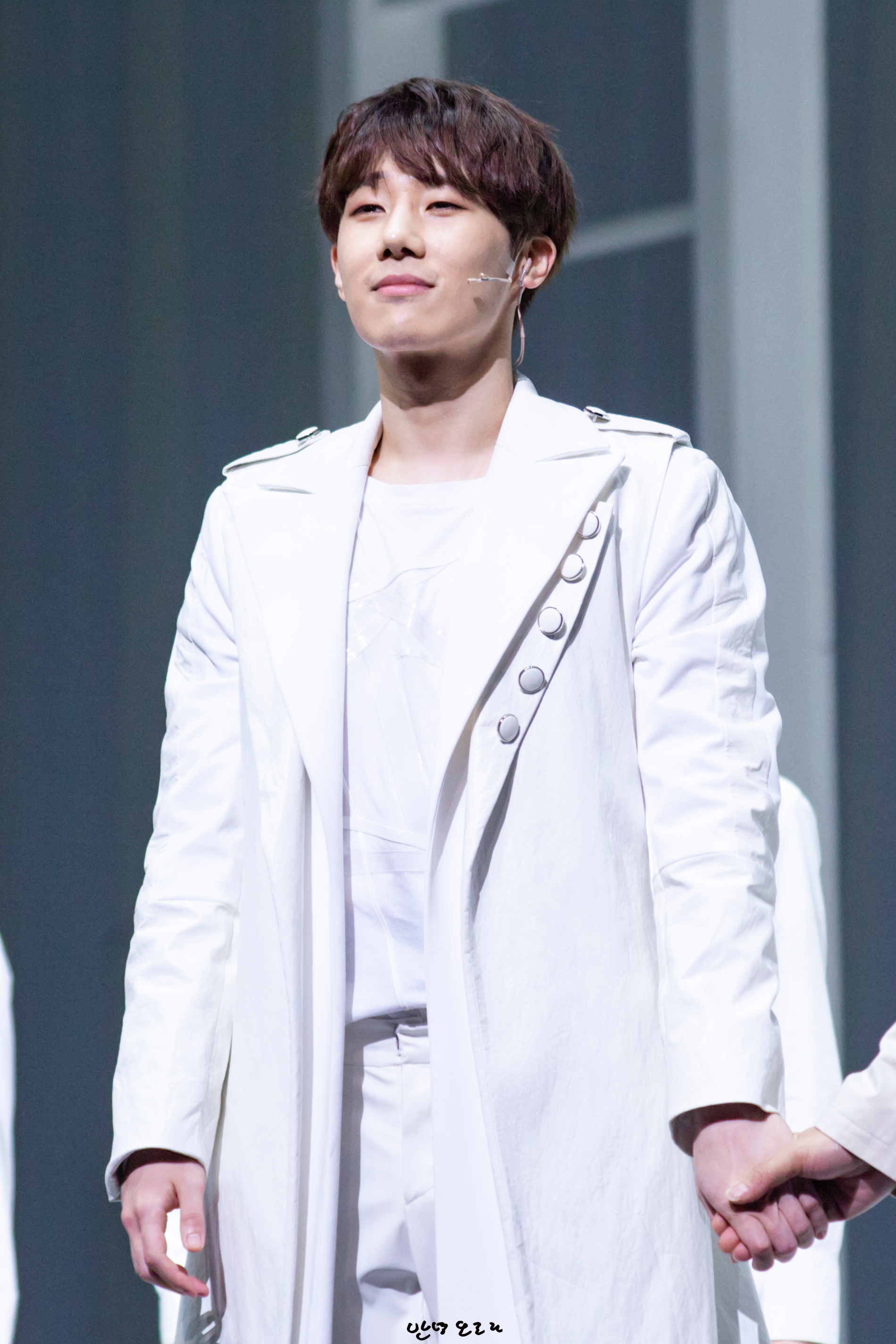
- Kim in 2021
- Born: April 28, 1989 (age 37); Jeonju, Jeollabuk-do, South Korea
- Education: Daekyeung University
- Occupations: Singer; actor; presenter
- Agent: Billions
- Musical career
- Genres: K-pop; Pop rock; Ballad; Dance-pop
- Instrument: Vocals
- Years active: 2010–present
- Labels: Woollim; Double H; Billions
- Member of: Infinite
- Website: dhtne.com

Korean name
- Hangul: 김성규
- Hanja: 金聖圭
- RR: Gim Seonggyu
- MR: Kim Sŏnggyu

Kim Sung-kyu (Korean: 김성규; Hanja: 金聖圭; born April 28, 1989), referred to as Sunggyu or Sungkyu, is a South Korean singer-songwriter and actor. He is the leader and main vocalist of South Korean boy band Infinite.

In November 2012, Kim began his solo career with his first extended play, Another Me, which debuted at number one on the Gaon Album Chart. His second extended play, 27 (2015), debuted at number one on the Gaon Album Chart and number eight on the US Billboard World Albums chart, and yielded two South Korean top-ten singles "The Answer" and "Kontrol".

== Early life ==
Kim Sung-kyu was born on April 28, 1989 in Jeonju, South Korea. He attended Jeonju National University High School and was in the school rock band called "Coma Beat". When Kim first told his parents about his dream to become a singer, they rejected it because they wanted him to have a normal life and told him they'd rather he leave the house instead. He continued to practice in secret and came to Seoul alone to pursue his dreams after graduating from high school.

In 2007, he auditioned for SM Entertainment but failed to make the cut, and auditioned once more in 2008 only to fail again. Due to his admiration for rock band Nell, he initially auditioned at Woollim Entertainment under the recommendation of Nell's manager whom he'd met coincidentally at the café where he worked at part-time. With a hurting stomach, Kim went to his audition and lightly threatened them by saying, "If you don't pick me, you're going to regret it." Afterwards he rushed to the hospital immediately and got an appendectomy. On the day of his release, he received the notification that he had passed his audition. Originally intending to pursue rock music in a band, Kim instead became a trainee for the dance group Infinite, of which he would later assume the positions of leader and main vocalist. Despite being criticized by his school friends, he believed that it was an opportunity nonetheless and persisted. In 2010, Kim finally made his debut with Infinite on June 9.

On February 15, 2013 SKim graduated from Daekyung University's Practical Music program and received along with members L, Sungyeol, Hoya, and Dongwoo, the 'Proud Daekyung University Student Award' in hopes that the group would continue to grow and bring prestige to the school. The members had been accepted through a special screened admittance in early 2011. Kim was a student of Practical Music at Hoseo University.

== Career ==
=== 2010–2011: Debut with Infinite and solo activities ===
Kim made his debut as the leader and main vocalist of South Korean boyband Infinite in 2010. The group officially debuted on June 9, 2010. In the same years, he was featured in Epik High's music video "Run" along with fellow members Woohyun, Sungyeol, L, and Sungjong.

Kim along with Infinite members Sungyeol and Seongjong became the special DJs for Super Junior's Kiss the Radio while Super Junior's Leeteuk and Eunhyuk were away. They were in charge of the radio broadcast from October 24 to the 30th in 2011.

Kim and other members of Infinite dubbed the children's cartoon Wara Store from December 27, 2011 to March 27, 2012 as themselves.

=== 2012–2014: Solo debut and solo activities ===
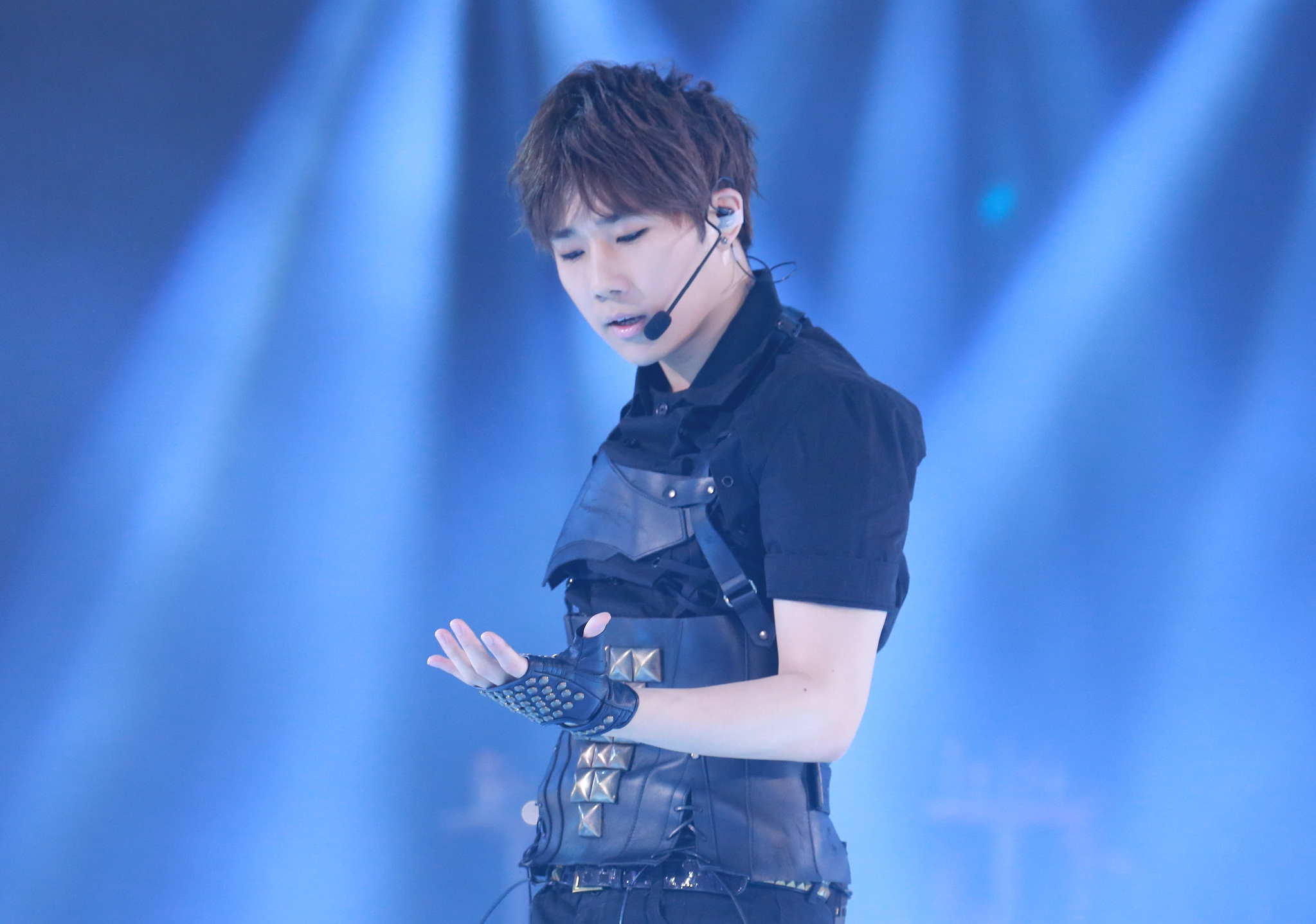
Kim performing at the Mnet 20's Choice Awards, July 2013

Kim made his debut as a musical actor, along with band member Woohyun, in the musical "Gwanghwamun Sonata". Kim plays the role of Jiyong, the son of the female lead. The musical lasted from January 3 until March 11, 2012.

In May 2012, it was announced that Kim would join Immortal Songs 2 as a fixed member alongside Super Junior's Ryeowook. His first performance on the show was aired on June 23. In July, it was announced that he would be leaving the show due to Infinite's overseas promotions. His final episode on the show aired on August 25.

Kim released his solo EP, Another Me on November 19. Nell's Kim Jongwan gave his composed "Shine" to Kim as a gift for his pre-release, which was released on November 7. Kim also composed the lead single "60 Seconds" with Sweetune and personally participated in writing the lyrics for the track "41 Days". L starred as the main character on the music video. Kim made a short promotion period of three weeks, and the album became the top selling physical album for the month of November with 62,958 copies sold. The album peaked at No. 22 with an album sales record of 70,552 copies on Gaon Chart's yearly physical album chart for 2012. In 2013, the album managed to be in the Monthly Top 100 Gaon album sales and at the end of the year recording 13,283 copies. Within the year 2014, the album's additional sales were 6,098 copies. Since its release until March 2015, the total albums sold was 91,212 copies.

In January 2013, Kim was confirmed to be a fixed cast on JTBC Lee Soo-geun and Kim Byung-man's High Society 2 along with Super Junior's Shindong. The show was aired from February 9 to June 15.

In February 2013, Kim was confirmed to have made a cameo appearance in KBS's new sitcom A Bit of Love alongside four other idols, MBLAQ's G.O, KARA's Seungyeon, ZE:A's Siwan, and Secret's Ji Eun. According to representatives, they'll appear as the younger versions of the five main characters for about three weeks. Kim played the younger version of Lee Hoon.

In April 2013, Kim joined tvN's new reality program, The Genius: Rules of the Game.

In addition, Kim was also featured in KBS2's new variety show "The Sea I Wanted", which told the story of six men's travel and experience in the open sea. The show is initially planned for a three-episode pilot with the first episode airing on September 11. In October 2013, he made the first featuring since debut in rapper Kanto's debut single What You Want.

In 2014, Kim was cast in the musical VAMPIRE along with Super Junior's Sungmin and F.T. Island's Lee Hong-gi.

=== 2015–2017: Solo comeback and television roles ===
On January 29, 2015, Kim was confirmed to star in new KBS variety show, Fluttering India, along with Exo's Suho, CNBLUE's Jonghyun, Super Junior's Kyuhyun, TVXQ's Changmin, and SHINee's Minho.

Kim released his second EP, 27 on May 11 which was produced by Nell's Kim Jong-wan. He was promoted double lead singles "The Answer" and "Kontrol" for which the music video were released on May 11. As of June 2015, the album has sold over 75 thousand copies locally.

On May 15, 2015, Kim and L with other artists such as Exo, Girl's Day, Sistar, Niel and Ailee sang the theme song for KBS1 Special Program 'I Am Korea', titled "The Day We Met", for Gwangbok's 70th Anniversary".

He was also cast in the musical In The Heights, along with bandmate Dongwoo (cast as the male lead 'Usnavi'). Kim played the main role 'Benny' with Exo's Chen and actor Seo Kyung-soo. The musical was produced by SM C&C, a subsidiary of SM Entertainment, and ran from September 4 to November 22 at 'Blue Square'.

On September 17, 2015, it was revealed that Kim would star in a new KBS series, Youth Express, alongside comedian Kim Sook and actor Park Jaemin.

In June 2016, he hosted JTBC's variety show Girl Spirit with comedian Jo Se-ho. The program aired on July 19.

In February 2017, he was confirmed as an MC for Channel A's variety show Singderella. It was later reported that he'd sustained a rib injury while filming the programme which ultimately led to the delay of Infinite's comeback.

August 2017 marked the release of "Drama" by R&B producer Primary featuring Kim, which topped multiple domestic charts.

=== 2018–2020: First full album solo comeback, concert, theatre play performance, and military enlistment ===
On January 25, 2018, it was announced that Kim will be participating in his first play, Amadeus, taking on the role of Mozart.

On February 26, 2018, Kim returned as a solo artist with his first full album, 10 Stories. The album was well received and its lead single, "True Love", garnered wins on two music shows and topped domestic chart. The album was also ranked ninth on Billboard's world album charts for the week ending March 10.

On March 29, 2018, Kim announced his first solo concert "Shine", which took place from May 5–7, 2018 in Seoul. The tickets for all three concert days were sold out within 3 minutes. More seats were added to all three days one day before the concert. On the last day of his solo concert, Kim made the surprise announcement that he is enlisting into the military on May 14, 2018. He served as an active duty soldier for the 22nd Division Infantry "Yulgok" located in the Goseong area (North Eastern part of South Korea). On July 3, 2018, it was announced that Kim would be starring in a military musical 'Shinheung Military Academy'. On September 8, 2019, it was announced that Kim will be in the military musical 'Return: The Promise of the Day'.

On December 14, 2020, Kim made his solo comeback with his third EP, Inside Me, and its lead single "I'm Cold".

=== 2021: Departure from Woollim ===
On March 1, Kim chose not to renew his contract and left Woollim Entertainment on March 6. However, he remains a member of Infinite. After his departure, he released his first single album Won't Forget You and its lead single "Hush" on March 29 as his last work under Woollim.

On June 14, 2021, Kim signed with DoubleH TNE, a subsidiary of NHN & MLD Entertainment, after the expiration of his contract with his former agency.

=== 2022: LV concert and solo album ===
On February 28, 2022, Kim announced his fourth solo concert "2022 Kim Sung Kyu Concert 'LV' (Light & Voice)", which took place from April 22–24, 2022 at Jamsil Indoor Stadium in Seoul. On April 18, 2022, Kim announced a domestic tour including the previously mentioned Seoul concert and further concerts taking place in Busan (June 4–5, 2022) and Daegu (June 11–12, 2022).

On April 22, 2022, Kim released his fourth EP, Savior, and its lead single of the same name.

In December 2022, Kim was announced as a mentor judge for JTBC's survival show Peak Time.

=== 2023: Solo and Infinite activities ===
From February 10–12, 2023, Kim held his fifth solo concert "2023 Kim Sung Kyu Concert 'LV'(Like Your Vibes)", which took place at Yes24 Live Hall. Kim will be holding the concert in Hong Kong (June 20, 2023) and Taipei (June 11, 2023).

In January 2023, Kim was announced as a cast of the musical Red Book, playing the character Brown.

On May 8, 2023, it was announced that Infinite has established a new agency, Infinite Company, and Kim is the representative of the company. Infinite is accelerating preparations for full-scale activities by opening new Infinite official social media accounts on Twitter, Instagram, Facebook, and a YouTube channel.

On June 1, 2023, Kim announced that his 5th mini-album 2023 S/S Collection would be released on June 28, 2023.

=== 2024: Musicals and LV3 solo concerts ===
Kim released a remake song "Feeling" on music sites on January 1, 2024.

On January 3, 2024, it was announced that Kim would play the lead role of Evan Hansen in Asia's premiere of the Dear Evan Hansen musical, a winner of 6 Tony awards, including Best Picture and Best Original Screenplay, at the 71st Tony Awards in 2017.

Kim held his LV3: Let's Vacay in Seoul concert from August 3–4, 2024, at Jamsil Student's Gymnasium, which were sold out on both days. He continued his LV3: Let's Vacay concerts in Kuala Lumpur on 10th to 11th August, in Taipei on 17th August, in Bangkok on 24th August and concluded the tour in Hong Kong on 31st August to 1st September 2024.

Kim returned to his role as Charlie in the musical Kinky Boots' 10th anniversary performances.

On September 2, 2024, Kim appeared in the first episode of Tour Fairy, a travel series with Kim as a tour guide, which is released through the YouTube channel Mdromeda Studio.

== Discography ==
=== Studio albums ===
Title	Album details	Peak chart positions			Sales
Title	Album details	KOR	JPN	US World	Sales
10 Stories	Released: February 26, 2018; Label: Woollim Entertainment, Kakao M; Formats: CD, digital download	1	47	9	KOR: 58,549; JPN: 1,331

=== Live albums ===
Title	Album details	Peak chart position	Sales
Title	Album details	KOR	Sales
Kim Sung Kyu 1st Solo Concert Live – Shine	Released: August 24, 2018; Label: Woollim Entertainment, Kakao M; Format: DVD, Blu-ray	4	KOR: 10,222

=== Extended plays ===
Title	Details	Peak chart position		Sales
Title	Details	KOR	US World	Sales
Another Me	Released: November 19, 2012; Label: Woollim Entertainment, Kakao M; Formats: CD, digital download	1	—	KOR: 94,306
27	Released: May 11, 2015; Label: Woollim Entertainment, Kakao M; Formats: CD, digital download	1	8	KOR: 77,200
Inside Me	Released: December 14, 2020; Label: Woollim Entertainment, Kakao M; Formats: CD, digital download	7	—	KOR: 43,921
Savior	Released: April 22, 2022; Label: Double H TNE; Formats: CD, digital download	4	—	KOR: 39,320
2023 S/S Collection	Released: June 28, 2023; Label: Double H TNE; Format: CD, digital download	19	—	KOR: 36,333
Off the Map	Released: March 2, 2026; Label: Billions; Format: CD, digital download	9	—	KOR: 34,359
"—" denotes releases that did not chart or were not released in that region.

=== Single albums ===
Title	Details	Peak chart position	Sales
Title	Details	KOR	Sales
Won't Forget You	Released: March 29, 2021; Label: Woollim Entertainment, Kakao M; Formats: CD, digital download	14	KOR: 13,262
Dear My Fan	Released: November 13, 2022; Label: DoubleH TNE; Formats: CD, digital download	28	KOR: 9,347

=== Singles ===
==== As lead artist ====
Title	Year	Peak chart positions		Sales	Album
Title	Year	KOR		Sales	Album
Title	Year	Gaon	Hot	Sales	Album
"Because"	2011	119	—	—N/a	Over the Top
"Shine"	2012	29	32	KOR: 138,036	Another Me
"60 Seconds" (60초)	2012	16	31	KOR: 365,402	Another Me
"Light"	2014	57	—	KOR: 37,413	Season 2
"The Answer" (너여야만 해)	2015	3	—	KOR: 243,024	27
"Kontrol"	2015	8	—	KOR: 122,410	27
"True Love"	2018	35	—	—N/a	10 Stories
"Don't Move" (머물러줘) (Shine Live Ver.)	2018	—	—	—N/a	Non-album single
"I'm Cold"	2020	113	—	—N/a	Inside Me
"Hush"	2021	— (Note: "Hush" did not enter the Gaon Digital Chart, but appeared at number 32 on the component Download Chart.)	—	—N/a	Won't Forget You
"Savior"	2022	— (Note: "Savior" did not enter the Gaon Digital Chart, but appeared at number 44 on the component Download Chart.)	—	—N/a	Savior
"Like a Dream" (꼭)	2022	— (Note: "Like a Dream" did not enter the Circle Digital Chart, but appeared at number 79 on the component Download Chart.)	—	—N/a	Dear My Fan
"Small Talk"	2023	—	—	—N/a	2023 S/S Collection
"When I Think About You"	2026	—	—	—N/a	Off The Map
"—" denotes releases that did not chart or were not released in that region.

==== As featured artist ====
Title	Year	Peak chart positions		Sales	Album
Title	Year	KOR		Sales	Album
Title	Year	Gaon	Hot	Sales	Album
"What You Want" (말만해) (Kanto featuring Kim Sung-kyu)	2013	21	20	186,140+	Non album-single
"—" denotes releases that did not chart or were not released in that region.

==== Other charted songs ====
Title	Year	Peak chart positions		Sales	Album
Title	Year	KOR		Sales	Album
Title	Year	Gaon	Hot	Sales	Album
"I Need You"	2012	69	81	KOR: 48,659+	Another Me
"Only Tears" (눈물만) (Acoustic Version)	2012	81	—	KOR: 41,350+	Another Me
"41th" (41일)	2012	85	—	KOR: 40,496+	Another Me
"Another Me"	2012	90	—	KOR: 37,059+	Another Me
"RE: Me" (RE: 나에게) (Yoon Sang duet with Kim Sung-kyu)	2014	53	—	17,437+	The Duets
"Daydream"	2015	25	—	KOR: 61,639+	27
"Alive"	2015	26	—	KOR: 46,084+	27
"Reply" (답가) (featuring Park Yoon-ha)	2015	29	—	KOR: 43,966+	27
"27"	2015	41	—	KOR: 29,777+	27
"Drama" (드라마) (Primary featuring Kim Sung-kyu)	2017	29	—	79,208+	Pop
"—" denotes releases that did not chart or were not released in that region.

=== Songwriting credits ===
Year	Song	Album	Artist	Label	Lyrics		Music	
Year	Song	Album	Artist	Label	Credited	With	Credited	With
2012	41 Days	Another Me	Kim Sung-kyu	Woollim Entertainment	Yes	Lee Junghoon	No	—N/a
2014	Light	Season 2	Kim Sung-kyu	Woollim Entertainment	Yes	—N/a	No	—N/a
2018	City of Angels	10 Stories	Kim Sung-kyu	Woollim Entertainment	Yes	Kim Jong-wan	No	—N/a
2020	Room	Inside Me	Kim Sung-kyu	Woollim Entertainment	Yes	Seon Woo Jeong-Ah	No	—N/a
2020	Climax	Inside Me	Kim Sung-kyu	Woollim Entertainment	Yes	BLSSD	No	—N/a
2022	Savior	Savior	Kim Sung-kyu	DoubleH TNE	Yes	Vermilion Frame (AVEC), Meang Co	No	—N/a
2022	I Dare You	Savior	Kim Sung-kyu	DoubleH TNE	Yes	—N/a	No	—N/a
2022	Fog (안개)	Savior	Kim Sung-kyu	DoubleH TNE	No	—N/a	Yes	Kim Jeonghoon, Chaz, Park Jaehee, Cha Ehwan
2022	Like a Dream (꼭)	Dear My Fan	Kim Sung-kyu	DoubleH TNE	Yes	BLSSD	No	—N/a
2023	Jump	2023 S/S Collection	Kim Sung-kyu	DoubleH TNE	Yes	—N/a	No	—N/a

== Filmography ==
=== Film ===
Title	Year	Role	Notes
Infinite Concert Second Invasion Evolution The Movie 3D	2012	Himself	Documentary film of Infinite
Grow: Infinite's Real Youth Life	2014	Himself	Documentary film of Infinite

=== Dramas ===
Title	Year	Role	Notes
The Thousandth Man	2012	Himself	Cameo
Pure Love	2013	Lee Hoon (Young)	Cameo

=== Television shows ===
Title	Year	Role	Notes/Ref.
Wara Store	2011	Himself (voice)	Korean dub
High Society	2013	Regular cast	
The Genius: Rules of the Game	2013	Himself (contestant)	
Exciting India	2015	Regular cast	
Girl Spirit	2016	Main host	
Singderella	2016–2017	Main host	
Living Together in Empty Room	2017–2018	Regular cast	
Like Likes Like	2020	Regular Cast	
Wild Idol	2021	Panelist	
The Origin	2022	Judge	
My: Humanities that Open Work	2022	Regular panelist	
Peak Time	2023	Judge	
Edu K-dol	2023	Host	with Jang Sung-kyu

=== Web shows ===
Year	Title	Role	Ref.
2022	Late Night Idol	Host	

=== Music videos ===
Title	Year	Director
"60sec"	2012	Unknown
"60sec" (Band ver.)	2012	Unknown
"I Need You"	2012	Unknown
"What U Want" (with Kanto)	2013	Unknown
"The Answer"	2015	Hwang Soo Ah
"Kontrol"	2015	Hwang Soo Ah
"Drama" (with Primary)	2017	Unknown
"True Love"	2018	Unknown
"Don't Move" (Shine Live Ver.)	2018	Unknown
"I'm Cold"	2020	Unknown
"Hush"	2021	Unknown
"Savior"	2022	Unknown
"Like a Dream" (꼭)	2022	Unknown
"Small Talk"	2023	Unknown

== Theater ==
Year	Title	Role	Ref.
2012	Gwanghamun Sonata	Jiyoung	
2014	Vampire	Count Dracula	
2015	In the Heights	Benny	
2016	All Shook Up	Elvis	
2016–2017	In the Heights	Benny	
2017–2018	Gwanghamun Sonata	Myungwoo (young)	
2018	Amadeus	Wolfgang Amadeus Mozart	
2018, 2019	Shinheung Military School	Ji Chung-chun	
2019	Return: The Promise of the Day	Woojoo	
2020	Kinky Boots	Charlie	
2020–2021	Amadeus	Wolfgang Amadeus Mozart	
2021	Gwanghwamun Sonata	Wolha	
2022	Xcalibur	Arthur	
2022	Kinky Boots	Charlie	
2023	Red Book	Brown	
2024	Dear Evan Hansen	Evan	
2024	Kinky Boots	Charlie	

== Tours ==
=== Concert Tour ===
==== Shine (2018) ====
City	Venue	Date
Seoul, South Korea	Kyunghee University Grand Peace Palace	May 5, 6 and 7

==== Shine Encore Tour (2020) ====
City	Venue	Date
Seoul, South Korea	SK Olympic Handball Gymnasium	February 7, 8, and 9
Tokyo, Japan	Toyosu PIT	February 22 and 23
Taipei, Taiwan	TICC	March 21 and 22

==== Light & Voice Tour (LV1) (2022) ====
City	Venue	Date
Seoul	Jamsil Indoor Stadium	April 22 23 and 24
Busan	Busan BEXCO Auditorium	June 4 and 5
Daegu	Daegu EXCO Convention Hall	June 11 and 12

==== Like your Vibes (LV2) (2023) ====
City	Venue	Date
Seoul	YES24 LIVE HALL	February 11 and 12
Taipei, Taiwan	TICC	June 11
Hongkong	Star Hall KITEC	June 20

==== Let's Vacay (LV3) (2024) ====
City	Venue	Date
Seoul, South Korea	jamsil students' gymnasium	August 3 and 4
Kuala Lumpur, Malaysia	Zepp Kuala Lumpur	August 10 and 11
Taipei, Taiwan	TICC	August 17
Bangkok, Thailand	MCC HALL The Mall Lifestore Ngamwongwan	August 24
Hongkong	MacPherson Stadium	August 31 and September 1

== Awards and nominations ==
Award	Year	Category	Nominated work	Result	Ref.
Beautiful Mint Life	2024	Best Rookie award		Won	
Daegu International Musical Festival	2024	Rookie of the Year	Red Book	Nominated	
Daegu International Musical Festival	2018	New Actor of the Year	Gwanghwamun Sonata	Nominated	
Melon Music Awards	2015	Top 10 Artists (Bonsang)	Kim Sung-kyu	Nominated	
Melon Music Awards	2015	Best Rock Song	"The Answer"	Won	
Melon Music Awards	2018	Best Rock Song	"True Love"	Nominated	
International K-Music Awards	2015	Best Male Solo	Kim Sung-kyu	Won	
Philippine K-pop Awards	2015	Best Solo Male Artist	Kim Sung-kyu	Won	
Philippine K-pop Awards	2015	Best Collaboration of the Year	"Daydream" (feat. Tablo, Jongwan)	Won	
