= Work It =

Work It may refer to:

- "Work It" (Missy Elliott song), 2002
- "Work It" (Nelly song), 2003 song featuring Justin Timberlake
- Work It (film), a 2020 American film
- Work It (TV series), a 2012 American sitcom
- "Work It", a song by Monrose from the album Temptation
- Work It, album by Rick Margitza 1995
- Work It! Convenience Store, a mobile game based on the webtoon Welcome to Convenience Store
