= Hiya (film) =

- Poster
- Directed by: Kim Ji-yeon
- Starring: Ahn Bo-hyun; Hoya; Kang Sung-mi; Park Chul-min
- Production company: Major Town
- Distributed by: Like Contents
- Release date: March 10, 2016 (South Korea)
- Running time: 109 minutes
- Country: South Korea
- Language: Korean

Hiya (Korean: 히야) is a 2016 South Korean film starring Ahn Bo-hyun and Hoya. A directorial debut by Kim Ji-yeon, the film depicts the brotherhood between an elder brother who is a troublemaker and his younger brother, a would-be singer who rejects his brother.

'Hiya' means an elder brother in the Gyeongsang Province dialect.

== Cast ==
- Ahn Bo-hyun as Lee Jin-sang
- Hoya as Lee Jin-ho
- Kang Sung-mi as Lee Hye-jin
- Park Chul-min as Choi Dong-pal
- Kang Min-ah as Choi Han-joo
- Choi Dae-chul as Gong Chang-bong
- Jung Kyung-ho as Park Dong-suk
- Jo Jae-ryong as Producer Oh
- Choi Phillip as Gi-nam
- Gi Ju-bong
- Jang Do-yoon as Ho-won
- Kim Ho-chang
- Choi Kwon-soo
- Choi Jong-hoon
- Seo Hyeon-woo as Yong-man
