= 27 (EP) =

EP by Kim Sung-kyu
- Released: May 11, 2015
- Recorded: 2014–2015
- Genres: Pop; Rock; Ballad
- Length: 23:48
- Language: Korean
- Label: Woollim Entertainment
- Producer: Kim Jong-wan (JW)

Kim Sung-kyu chronology
Another Me (2012)	27 (2015)	10 Stories (2018)

Singles from 27
- 1. "The Answer" Released: 11 May 2015; 2. "Kontrol" Released: 11 May 2015

Music video
- The Answer (Music Video) on YouTube; Kontrol (Music Video) on YouTube

27 is the second extended play by South Korean singer, Kim Sung-kyu. It was released on 11 May 2015. The album release double title tracks as the lead singles, The Answer (너여야만 해) and Kontrol.

== Track listing ==
No.	Title	Lyrics	Music	Length
1.	"27"		JW	1:33
2.	"The Answer" (너여야만 해; Neoyeoyaman Hae)	JW, ZOCEY	JW, ZOCEY	3:37
3.	"Alive"	JW	JW, SPACEBOY	4:40
4.	"Kontrol"	JW	JW	3:41
5.	"Daydream" (featuring Borderline: Epik High's Tablo & Nell's Kim Jong-wan)	JW, Tablo	JW	4:13
6.	"Reply" (답가; Dabka) (featuring Park Yoon-ha)	JW	JW	4:00

== Awards and nominations ==
=== Music program awards ===
Song	Program	Date
"The Answer"	The Show (SBS MTV)	May 19, 2015
"The Answer"	Show! Music Core (MBC)	May 23, 2015

== Charts ==
=== Album chart ===
Country	Chart	Peak position	Sales
South Korea	South Korean Gaon Weekly Albums Chart	1	KOR: 75,001
United States	US Billboard World Albums Chart	8	KOR: 75,001

=== Singles chart ===
==== The Answer ====
Chart	Peak position
Gaon Weekly Singles Chart	3

==== Kontrol ====
Chart	Peak position
Gaon Weekly Singles Chart	8

==== Other charted songs ====
Song	Gaon Chart Position
"27"	41
"Alive"	26
"Daydream"	25
"Reply"	29

== Release history ==
Region	Format	Date	Label
South Korea	CD, digital download	May 11, 2015	S.M. Culture and Contents; Woollim Entertainment; LOEN Entertainment
Worldwide	Digital download	May 11, 2015	S.M. Culture and Contents; Woollim Entertainment; LOEN Entertainment
