= Infinite H =

2013–2017 South Korean boyband

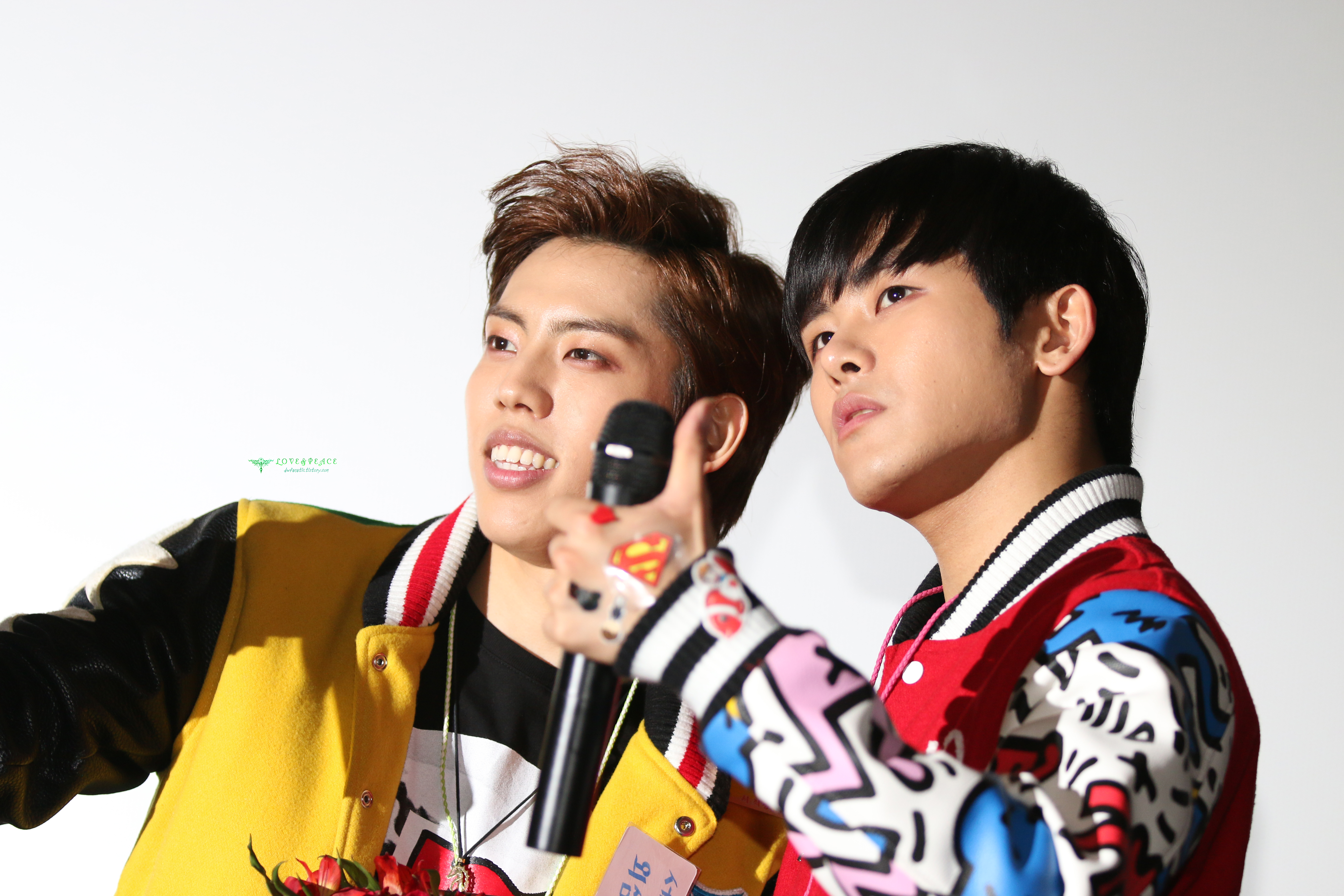
- Infinite H in Yongsan, February 2015

Background information
- Origin: Seoul, South Korea
- Genres: K-pop; Hip hop; Dance
- Years active: 2013–2017
- Label: Woollim Entertainment
- Spinoff of: Infinite
- Past members: Dongwoo; Hoya
- Website: Infinite H

Infinite H (Korean: 인피니트H) was the first official sub-unit of South Korean boy band Infinite formed under Woollim Entertainment in 2013. The sub-group consisted of Infinite member Dongwoo and ex-Infinite member Hoya. The sub-unit debuted with their mini album titled Fly High in January 2013.

== History ==
=== 2012: Pre-debut ===
Prior to their debut as a subgroup, the duo had performed new songs such as "Crying" and "You Look Good" during Infinite's concerts and had already received much attention. Although they had been releasing new songs during concerts, Woollim Entertainment only announced that they will be promoting as a sub-unit in 2013 after finishing up with Infinite's activities in Japan. They also performed, "Without You", a song from their debut album at the “Infinite Concert That Summer” on August 8, 2012. On December 20, 2012, they performed for the first time as a duo on M Countdown for a special stage.

=== 2013–14: Debut with Fly High ===
On January 11, 2013, their debut EP Fly High was officially released. The duo started promotions for the album on January 10, 2013, on M! Countdown.

On February 28 and March 1, 2014, during Infinite's encore concert, "One Great Step Returns", Infinite H performed their new song Alone, which written by them. The song was later added to Infinite's second full album, Season 2.

=== 2015–2017: Fly Again and Hoya's Departure ===
On January 26, 2015, their made comeback after two-years with released their second EP, Fly Again. They also held a press conference and a showcase on the same day at AX Korea, in Seoul. Promotions for the album started on January 31, on M Countdown.

In August 2017, Hoya left Infinite and Infinite H. The future of Infinite H remains in doubt.

== Members ==
- Jang Dong-woo (장동우) – main rap
- Hoya (Lee Howon; 이호원) – rap, vocals

== Discography ==
=== Albums ===
==== Mini-albums ====
Title	Album details	Peak chart positions	Sales
Title	Album details	KOR	Sales
Fly High	Released: January 11, 2013; Label: Woollim Entertainment; Format: CD, digital download	2	KOR: 96,063
Fly Again	Released: January 26, 2015; Label: Woollim Entertainment; Format: CD, digital download	1	KOR: 41,888

=== Singles ===
Title	Year	Peak chart positions			Sales	Album
Title	Year	KOR	KOR Billboard	JPN Billboard	Sales	Album
"Special Girl" (featuring Bumkey)	2013	5	6	11	KOR: 802,924	Fly High
"Pretty" (예뻐)	2015	2	-	-	KOR: 205,021	Fly Again

=== Other charted songs ===
Title	Year	Peak chart positions		Album
Title	Year	KOR Gaon	KOR Billboard	Album
"Victorious Way"	2013	59	-	Fly High
"Without U" (니가 없을 때; Niga Eopseul Ttae)	2013	22	22	Fly High
"I Can't" (못해; Mothae)	2013	29	-	Fly High
"Fly High" (featuring Baby Soul)	2013	50	-	Fly High
"Fly Again" (featuring DJ IT)	2015	58	-	Fly Again
"Go Nowhere" (어디 안 가; Eodi An Ga) (featuring Yang Da-il)	2015	30	-	Fly Again
"Bump It" (부딪쳐; Buditchyeo) (featuring Sujeong of Lovelyz)	2015	27	-	Fly Again
"Sorry, I'm Busy" (바빠서 Sorry; Bappaseo Sorry) (featuring Swings and Champagne of Champagne & Candle)	2015	33	-	Fly Again
"Jekyll & Hyde" (지킬 앤 하이드) (featuring Taewan)	2015	35	-	Fly Again
"Crazy" (니가 미치지 않고서야; Niga Michiji Ankoseoya) (featuring Sanchez of Phantom)	2015	32	-	Fly Again

== Filmography ==
=== Television series ===
Year	Title	Network
2015	Infinite H Self Story	Naver Starcast
