= Inside Me (EP) =

Mini-album by Kim Sung-kyu

EP by Kim Sung-kyu
- Released: December 14, 2020
- Recorded: 2020
- Genre: Electropop; R&B
- Length: 21:32
- Language: Korean
- Label: Woollim

Kim Sung-kyu chronology
Shine (2018)	Inside Me (2020)	Won't Forget You (2021)

Singles from Inside Me
- 1. "I'm Cold" Released: December 14, 2020

Inside Me is the third mini-album by South Korean singer Kim Sung-kyu. It was released on December 14, 2020, by Woollim Entertainment and distributed by Kakao M. Upon completing his compulsory military service in January 2020, Kim sought to release new music. Facing delays amid the COVID-19 pandemic, he recorded music which deviated from his previous work, resulting in an electropop and R&B record.

Following a series of photo and video teasers, Inside Me and the lead single "I'm Cold" were simultaneously released, nearly three years after his first studio album 10 Stories. Kim promoted the song by performing it on music chart programs across various television networks. The mini-album peaked at number seven on South Korea's national Circle Album Chart and has sold 44,000 copies since its release.

== Background ==
Following the completion of his mandatory military service in January 2020, Kim began actively appearing as a guest on entertainment television programs and taking part in musicals. On November 15, he held an online concert entitled the Kim Sung-kyu Ontact Concert – The Day. He performed the album track "Room" for the first time during the performance.

For his previous albums, Kim had worked with Nell's Jong-wan. While developing Inside Me, he sought a sonic shift and wanted to create music which differed from the recordings of his previous albums. He expressed his desire to fill the album with various genres. Conceptually, Kim wanted to display a "mature and restrained sexiness". He initially planned to release an album immediately after being discharged from the military, but the project was delayed due to various circumstances, including the ongoing COVID-19 pandemic in South Korea.

== Music ==
Tamar Herman of South China Morning Post described Inside Me as a "moody" electropop and R&B record "that verges on contemporary jazz and neo soul but never quite goes where one expects". She noted that Kim "[plays] around with pitch shifts and tonal vacillation" throughout the album tracks. The album tone articulates "tangled, unrestricted, and lonely" feelings. "I'm Cold" is an R&B and hip hop coupled with an electric piano and guitar riff. "Fade" is an alternative R&B track which incorporates a dreamlike sound and groovy melody. Thematically, the song deals with wanting to slowly detach oneself from happy memories after a breakup. "Room" demonstrates Kim's wide vocal range. The lyrics describe being unable to accept a breakup and being stuck in regret, comparing it to confinement in a room. "Divin'" expresses a "cute" and "nerdy" love confession with an R&B feel. It opens with the sound of a cassette tape to instill a retro feel. "Climax" conveys Kim's worries pledges to the second turning point of his life. The track's foundation lies in its "warm and rhythmical" synthesizer.

== Release and promotion ==
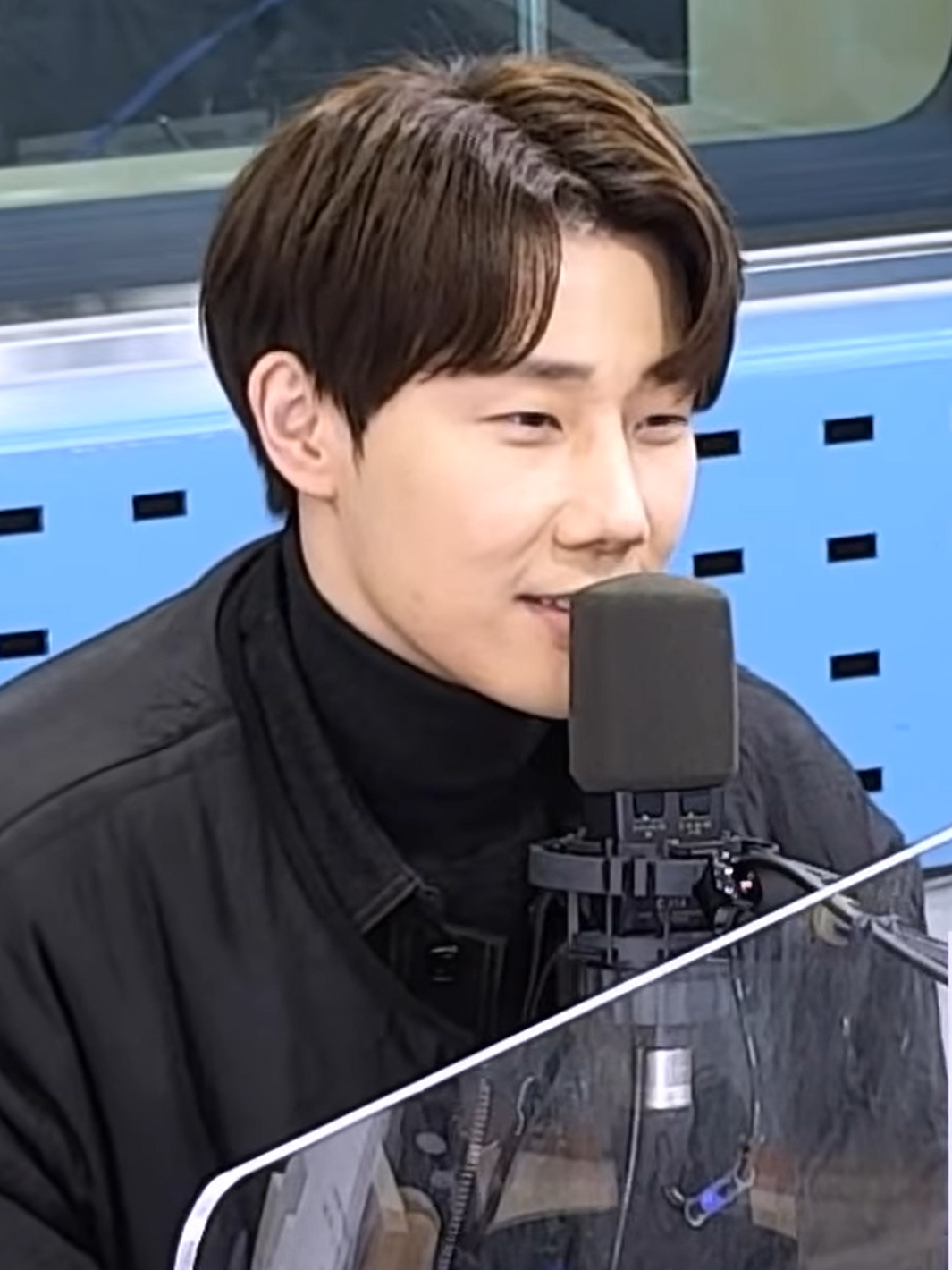
Kim on Choi Hwa-jung's Powertime

On December 1, 2020, Woollim Entertainment published a "comeback" video trailer announcing the forthcoming release of Inside Me. Two concept photos were posted four days later: Kim wore horn-rimmed glasses and a striped suit with pomade-styled hair in the first, while the second was a "mysterious" black-and-white photo. A 30-second "A version" album trailer was uploaded on December 6; the video displayed scenes of Kim at a bar wearing a see-through shirt. A second pair of concept photos were posted on the subsequent day; one showed Kim with tattoos on various parts of his body, and he donned a wet white shirt with disheveled hair in the other. The "B version" concept trailer was unveiled on December 8 showcasing Kim's tattoos and scenes of him wearing a robe. A live clip preview was shared on December 10. It was followed by a pair of music video teasers for "I'm Cold" in two successive days.

Inside Me and the music video for "I'm Cold" were simultaneously issued on December 14. It marked two years and ten months since the release of Kim's previous studio album 10 Stories in February 2018. Kim hosted an online showcase in commemoration of the album's release on the same day. He appeared as a guest on the radio programs SBS Power FM's Choi Hwa-jung's Powertime, Lee Joon's Young Street, and Cultwo Show, Naver Now's Before 6:05, MBC FM4U's Hope Song at Noon, and KBS Cool FM's Kiss the Radio. In addition to the lead single "I'm Cold", Kim began promoting on weekly music chart shows three days later by performing "Room" on Mnet's M Countdown and Munhwa Broadcasting Corporation's (MBC) Show! Music Core, "Fade" on KBS2's Music Bank, and "Climax" and "Fade" on Seoul Broadcasting System's (SBS) Inkigayo.

== Critical reception and commercial performance ==
Inside Me received favorable reviews from all four critics from TV Daily. Kim Han-kil called the album a "masterpiece", while Kim Ji-ha was impressed by Kim's "cool and skilled" vocal performance. Oh Ji-won noted that, despite not working with Nell's Jong-wan on the record, his influence over Kim's music was evident.

On the chart dated December 13–19, 2020, Inside Me debuted at number seven on South Korea's national Circle Album Chart. By the end of the month, the mini-album shifted 40,456 units domestically. It moved an additional 3,465 copies in January 2021, bringing its total to 43,921 albums sold.

== Track listing ==
Inside Me
No.	Title	Lyrics	Music	Arrangement	Length
1.	"Inside Me"		BLSSD	BLSSD	1:48
2.	"I'm Cold"	BLSSD	BLSSD	BLSSD	3:49
3.	"Fade" (안녕; Annyeong)	BLSSD	BLSSD	BLSSD	3:57
4.	"Room"	Sunwoo Jung-a, Kim Sung-kyu	Sunwoo Jung-a, Baek Gyeong-jin	Sunwoo Jung-a, Baek Gyeong-jin	4:22
5.	"Divin'"	BXN, Yoonseok	BXN, Yoonseok	BXN	3:30
6.	"Climax"	BLSSD, Kim Sung-kyu	BLSSD	BLSSD	4:06
Total length:					21:32

== Chart ==
Chart (2020)	Peak position
South Korean Albums (Circle)	7
