= Daekyeung University =

University in Gyeongsan, South Korea

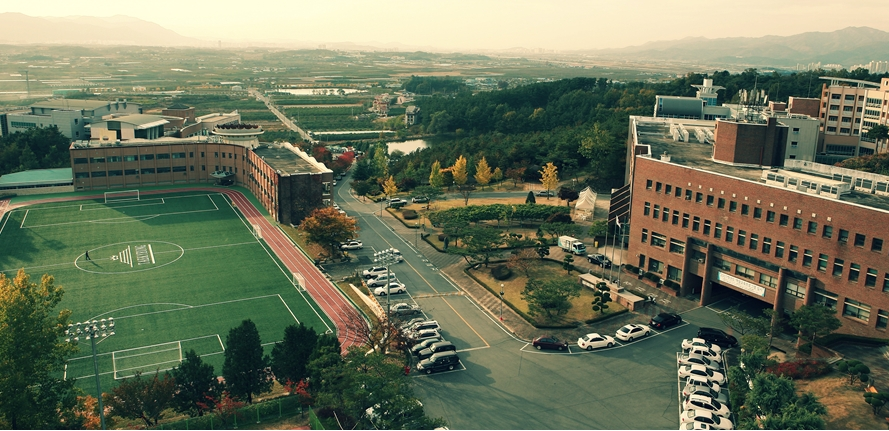
- Motto: "Be Different rather than Excellent"
- Type: Private junior college
- Established: October 29, 1992; 32 years ago
- Academic staff: 104 (2022)
- Total staff: 326 (excluding faculty) (2022)
- Undergraduates: 4,822 (2022)
- Address: 65 Danbuk 1-gil, Jain-myeon, Gyeongsan, North Gyeongsang Province, South Korea
- Website: http://www.tk.ac.kr/

- Daekyeung University
- Hangul: 대경대학교
- Hanja: 大慶大學校
- RR: Daegyeong daehakgyo
- MR: Taegyŏng taehakkyo

Daekyeung University (Korean: 대경대학교) is a private university located in Gyeongsan, South Korea.

== History ==
Daegyeong University began as Daegyeong College on October 29, 1992. It opened on March 5 of the following year. In May 1998, it was renamed Daegyeong University. In September 2012, it was renamed Daegyeong University, and in September 2018, it opened a campus in Namyangju.

Meanwhile, in 2012 and 2015, the Ministry of Education and other institutions designated it as a university with limited financial support and received a D+ grade in the University Restructuring Evaluation.[2][3] However, in 2017, the university regained its honor and the funding restrictions were lifted.

In September 2018, it opened a campus in Namyangju, Gyeonggi Province, becoming the second vocational college to have a campus in Namyangju. Meanwhile, it celebrated its 25th anniversary in 2018, and President Lee Chae-young will be in office in 2022.

== Educational Structure ==
Daekyung University offers specialized bachelor's degree programs in three majors: Arts and Physical Education, Humanities and Social Sciences, and Natural Sciences.

== Campus Landscape ==
Daegyeong University is a private technical college located in Gyeongsangbuk-do and Gyeonggi-do, with locations in Gyeongsan and Namyangju.

=== Main Campus ===
Daegyeong University's main campus, located in Danbuk-ri, is the university's headquarters. Accessible via Danbuk-gil, it consists of nine buildings, housing lecture halls and dormitories for three academic departments.

=== Hallyu Campus ===
Daekyung University's Hallyu Campus is a dual campus of Daekyung University, located in Pallyari. Accessible via Pallyasan-dan Road, the campus consists of two buildings, housing specialized courses for one department of the Arts and Physical Education program.

== Notable alumni ==
- Lee Dong-hyun, football Player
- Lee Min-ki, actor and model
- Kim Woo-bin, actor and model
- Chang Hyuk-jin, football player
- Ahn Bo-hyun, actor
- Choi Woong, actor
- Choi Young-jae (born 1996), South Korean actor and singer, member of Got7
- Hoya (Lee Ho-dong), actor and singer (Infinite)
- Jang Dong-woo, singer (Infinite)
- Jang Mi-kwan, model and actor
- Kim Sung-kyu, singer (Infinite)
- L (Kim Myung-soo), actor and singer (Infinite)
- Lee Sung-yeol, actor and singer (Infinite)
- Yugyeom (Kim Yu-gyeom), singer (Got7)
- Wonpil, singer (Day6)
- Smeb (Song Kyung-ho), professional League of Legends player
