= Because I Love You (2017 film) =

- Theatrical release poster
- Hangul: 사랑하기 때문에
- RR: Saranghagi ttaemune
- MR: Saranghagi ttaemune
- Directed by: Joo Ji-hoong
- Produced by: Cha Ji-hyun
- Starring: Cha Tae-hyun; Kim You-jung; Seo Hyun-jin; Sung Dong-il; Oh Na-ra; Bae Sung-woo
- Edited by: Kim Chang-ju
- Production company: AD406 Pictures
- Distributed by: Next Entertainment World
- Release date: 4 January 2017
- Country: South Korea
- Language: Korean
- Box office: US$2,340,649

Because I Love You (Korean: 사랑하기 때문에) is a 2017 South Korean fantasy-comedy omnibus film starring Cha Tae-hyun and Kim You-jung. Directed by Joo Ji-hoong, it premiered on January 4, 2017. This movie starring Cha Tae-hyun is produced by his elder brother Cha Ji-hyun who also produced the film The Grand Heist starring Tae-hyun.

== Synopsis ==
This movie is about Lee Hyeong (Cha Tae-hyun) whose spirit, after an accident, started entering the bodies of people struggling with love, and Scully (Kim You-jung), the high school student who guides his spirit along the way.

== Cast ==
- Cha Tae-hyun as Jin Yi-hyung
- Kim You-jung as Jang Soo-yi (Scully)
- Seo Hyun-jin as Lee Hyun-kyung
- Sung Dong-il as Park Chan-il
- Oh Na-ra as Park Chan-il's wife
- Bae Sung-woo as Ahn Yeo-don
- Kim Sa-hee as Da-in
- Kim Yoon-hye as Kim Mal-hee
- Jang Do-yoon as Yo-Seb
- Lee Jae-woo as Audition PD
- Hong Kyung-min as Senior Judge
- Lim Ju-hwan as Chan-young
- Kim Kang-hoon as Park Jung-min
- Sun Woo Yong Nyeo as old woman with Alzheimer's
- Park Geun-hyung as husband of old woman with Alzheimer's
- Jang Hyuk as Fortune teller
- Yoon Da-kyung as Kim Mal-hee's mother
- Ok Ja-yeon as School guard
