= Hoya (singer) =

South Korean singer, actor, and dancer (born 1991)

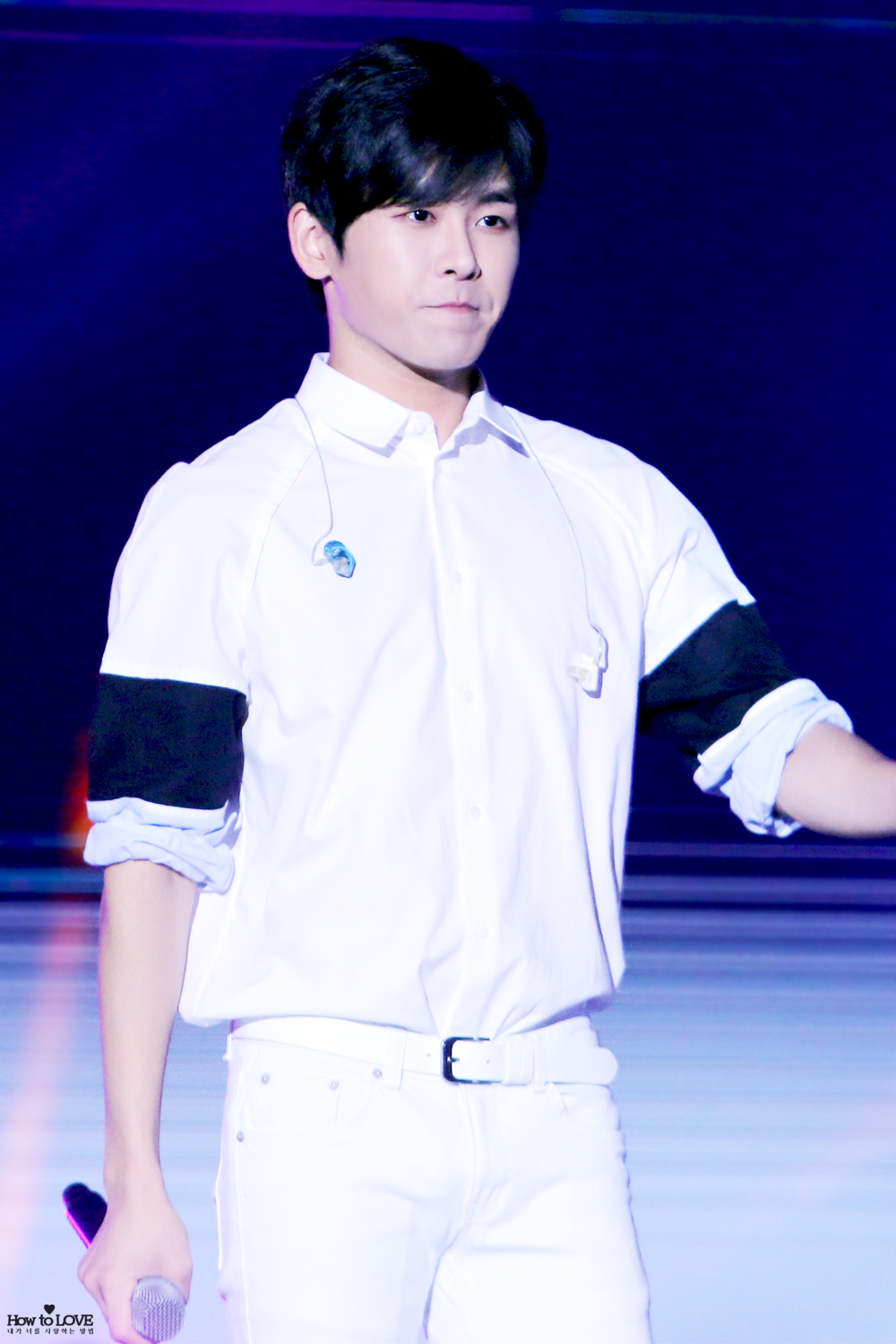
- Hoya in August 2015
- Born: Lee Ho-dong; March 28, 1991 (age 35); Busan, South Korea
- Other names: Hoya; Lee Ho-won
- Education: Daekyung University
- Occupations: Singer; rapper; songwriter; dancer; actor
- Years active: 2010–present
- Agent: Initial
- Musical career
- Genres: K-pop; dance-pop; hip hop; R&B
- Instrument: Vocals
- Labels: Woollim; Glorious; Illusion; WakeOne (Note: As a member of Mbitious only.)
- Member of: Mbitious
- Formerly of: Infinite; Infinite H

Korean name
- Hangul: 이호원
- Hanja: 李浩沅
- RR: I Howon
- MR: I Howŏn

Stage name
- Hangul: 호야
- RR: Hoya
- MR: Hoya

Former name
- Hangul: 이호동
- Hanja: 李浩東
- RR: I Hodong
- MR: I Hodong

Lee Ho-won (Korean: 이호원; born Lee Ho-dong (Korean: 이호동) on March 28, 1991), known professionally as Hoya, is a South Korean singer, rapper, songwriter, actor, and dancer, currently a member of the dance crew Mbitious. He is known to have been a rapper and vocalist in boy band Infinite (and later its sub-group Infinite H) from 2010 until his departure from Woollim Entertainment in 2017. In 2018, Hoya made his solo debut on March 28 with his first EP Shower.

Hoya made his acting debut in the drama Reply 1997 (2012) and went on to star in the dramas My Lovely Girl (2014), Mask (2015), Radiant Office (2017), and Two Cops (2017), Devilish Charm (2018).

== Biography ==
Hoya was born in Busan, South Korea. He dropped out of high school during his first year to pursue his dream as a singer. His father was against the decision thus Hoya had to leave home. He then took the high school qualification exam and passed. Later his father accepted him and now supports Infinite whole heartedly. Hoya auditioned after he dropped out and ended up in his current agency, Woollim Entertainment. He was a former JYP Entertainment trainee.

On March 10, 2014, he announced that his real birth name is Lee Hodong, not Howon as he had previously told the public, and that he changed it in order not to share a name with comedian Kang Hodong.

Hoya graduated from Daekyeung University, majoring in Applied Music.

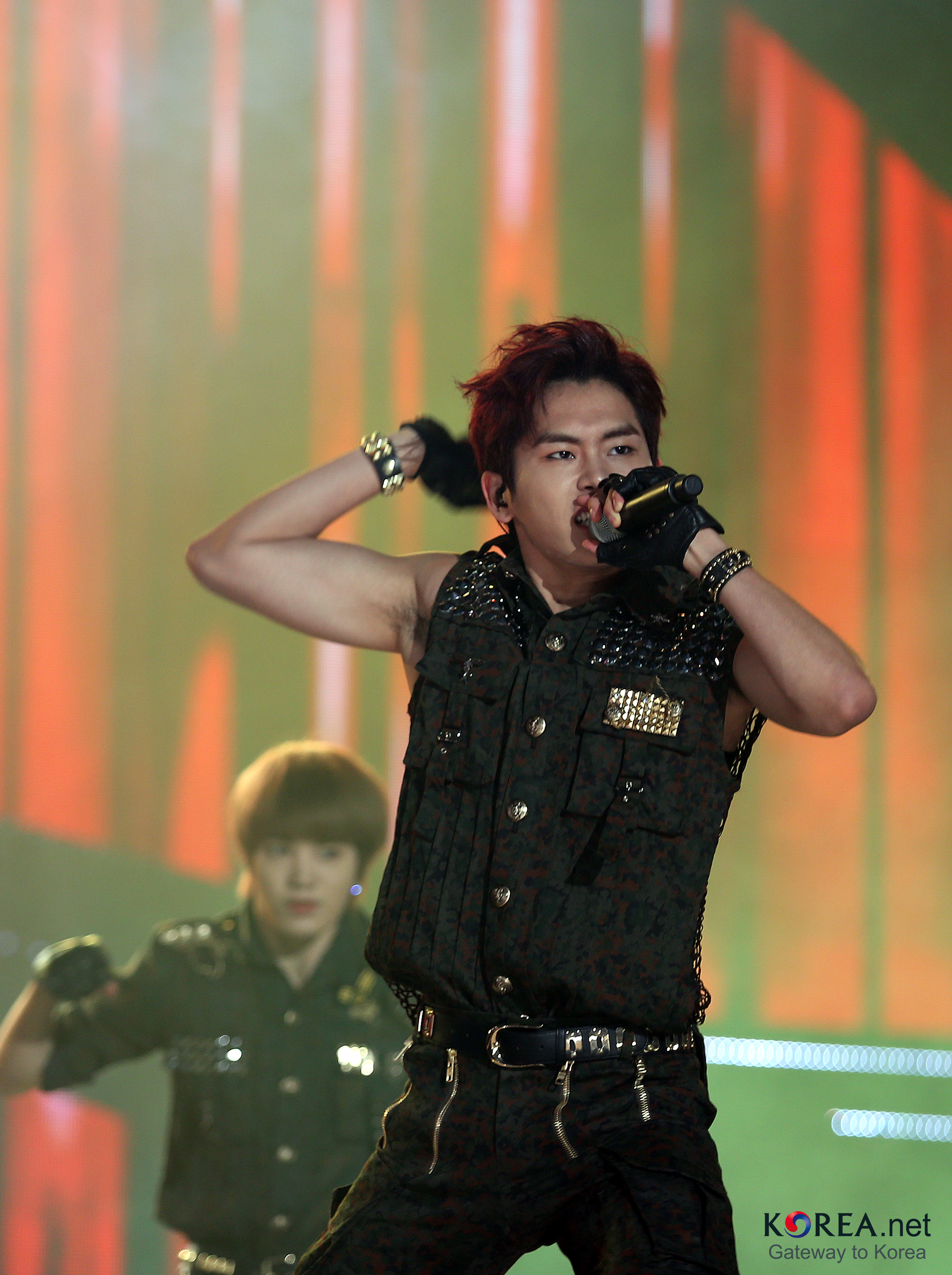
Hoya at K-Pop World Festival 2013.

== Career ==
=== 2010: Debut with Infinite ===
Hoya debuted as rapper, vocal and main dancer of South Korean boyband Infinite in 2010. The group officially debuted on June 9, 2010.

=== 2012–2014: Infinite H's debut and acting roles ===
Hoya made his acting debut in the tvN drama Reply 1997. The drama was a major hit and raised his popularity.

In September 2012, Hoya and fellow Infinite member Dongwoo formed a subgroup called Infinite H. The subgroup released their first mini-album, titled Fly High, in January 2013.

In 2014, Hoya starred in SBS' music romance drama, My Lovely Girl; which co-stars his fellow Infinite member Kim Myung-soo.

On September 24, 2014, Hoya was cast as the lead role in the film Hiya. He played a high school student who only dreams of becoming a singer. The film premiered on March 10, 2015.

=== 2015–2017: Departure from Infinite, solo activities ===
In 2015, Hoya starred in SBS's melodrama Mask, acting as Soo Ae's brother.

In June 2016, Hoya became a contestant in Mnet's dance survival show, Hit The Stage. In December, it was announced that Hoya has been cast in the sitcom Strong Family 2017, which started airing in February 2017.

Hoya was a supporting role in MBC's office drama, Radiant Office. On August 30, it was confirmed that Hoya would not be renewing his contract (which expired June 9, 2017) and would be leaving Infinite as well as Woollim Entertainment. In September, he made his musical debut in Hourglass, a play based on the mega hit Korean drama Sandglass. He then starred in MBC's cop drama, Two Cops.

=== 2018–present: Solo debut ===
In 2018, Lee made his solo debut on March 28 with his first mini album Shower. He was then cast in the romance comedy drama Devilish Charm. In the midst of all, Lee also went to Immortal Song 2 that was broadcast on August 4 and eventually won the episode by getting the highest scores there. Lee also became a dance coach/mentor in KBS variety program, Dancing High that focuses on teaching and mentoring the teens in Korea about dance. On September 12, Lee also released a digital single titled, 'Baby U' featuring Kriesha Chu in the music video.

Hoya enlisted for military service on February 7, 2019, by announcing it through a post two days before the date; he was discharged on December 6, 2020.

On June 9, 2021, Hoya made his comeback with the new digital single album 1AM.

On April 1, 2022, Hoya signed an exclusive contract with Initial Entertainment.

== Discography ==
=== Extended plays ===
Title	Album details	Peak chart positions	Sales
Title	Album details	KOR	Sales
Shower	Released: March 28, 2018; Label: Glorious Entertainment, Genie Music; Formats: CD, digital download; Track listing: 1. Shower (Intro); 2. Angel; 3. All Eyes On Me; 4. Reply (점); 5. Sigh (한숨); 6. Dance (춤) (Outro)	9	KOR: 10,818

=== Single albums ===
Title	Album details	Peak chart positions	Sales
Title	Album details	KOR	Sales
1AM	Released: June 9, 2021; Label: Glorious Entertainment, Genie Music; Formats: Digital download; Track listing: 1. Someday; 2. Stay With Me; 3. I Don't Give A	—	—N/a

=== Singles ===
Title	Year	Peak chart positions		Sales (DL)	Album
Title	Year	KOR	KOR Hot	Sales (DL)	Album
As lead artist
"Pretending I'm Okay"	2014	—	—	—N/a	Non album-singles
"Angel"	2018	—	—	—N/a	Shower
"All Eyes On Me"	2018	—	—	—N/a	Shower
"Baby U"	2018	—	—	—N/a	Non-album singles
"Stay With Me"	2021	—	—	—N/a	1AM
As featured artist
"Ooh Ooh" (Eric Nam ft. Hoya)	2014	48	—	KOR: 34,194	Non-album singles
"Need You Now" (Henry ft. Hoya)	2014	—	—	KOR: 13,756	Fantastic
Soundtrack appearances
"About To Explode" (as Road King)	2016	—	—	—N/a	Hiya OST
"May I Love You"	2017	—	—	—N/a	Hourglass OST
Collaboration
"Yesterday" (as Dynamic Black)	2012	9	—	KOR: 269,507	2012 SBS Gayo Daejun The Colors Of K-Pop
"—" denotes releases that did not chart or were not released in that region.

=== Songwriting credits ===
Year	Album	Artist	Song	Lyrics		Music		Notes
Year	Album	Artist	Song	Credited	With	Credited	With	Notes
2014	Season 2	Infinite	"Last Romeo"	Yes	Song Sooyoon, Dongwoo	No	—N/a	
2014	Season 2	Infinite H	"Alone"	Yes	Rphabet, Dongwoo	No	—	
2014	Non album-single	Hoya	"Pretending I'm Okay"	Yes	—	Yes	—	
2015	Fly Again	Infinite H	"Pretty"	Yes	9999, Dongwoo	Yes	9999	
2016	Infinite Only	Infinite	"One Day"	Yes	Rphabet's Razer & Dongwoo	Yes	Rphabet's Razer	
2016	Infinite Only	Infinite	"True Love"	Rap	Dongwoo	No	—	
2018	Shower	Hoya	"Angel"	Yes	NiiHWA	No	—	
2018	Shower	Hoya	"All Eyes On Me"	Yes	NiiHWA	No	—	
2018	Shower	Hoya	"Reply"	Yes	NiiHWA	No	—	
2018	Shower	Hoya	"Sigh"	Yes	NiiHWA	No	—	

== Filmography ==
=== Film ===
Year	Title	Role	Notes	Ref.
2016	Hiya	Lee Jin-ho		
2022	Urban Myths	Choong-jae	Segment: "Tooth Worms"	
2022	Birth	Choi Yang-eop		

=== Television series ===
Year	Title	Role	Notes	Ref.
2012	Reply 1997	Kang Joon-hee		
2013	Reply 1994	Kang Joon-hee	Cameo	
2014	My Lovely Girl	Kang Rae-hoon		
2015	Mask	Byun Ji-hyuk		
2017	Strong Family 2017	Lee Gwi-nam		
2017	Radiant Office	Jang Kang-ho		
2017	Two Cops	Dok Go Sun-hyeok		
2018	Devilish Charm	Sung Ki-joon		
2019	Hip Hop King – Nassna Street			
2024–2025	Check-in Hanyang			

=== Television shows ===
Year	Title	Role	Notes	Ref.
2016	Hit the Stage	Contestant		
2018	Dancing High	Dance coach		
2022	Be Mbitious	Contestant	Final member of Mbitious	
2022	Street Man Fighter	Contestant	As a member of Mbitious	

== Musical theatre ==
Title	Year	Role	Ref.
2017–2018	Hourglass	Baek Jae-hee	
2022	Secretly, Greatly: THE LAST	Won Ryu-hwan	

== Awards and nominations ==
Year	Award	Category	Nominated work	Result	Ref.
2016	36th Golden Cinema Festival	Best New Actor	Hiya	Won	
2017	MBC Drama Awards	Best New Actor	Radiant Office	Nominated	
