= Won't Forget You (single album) =

Single album by Kim Sung-kyu

Single album by Kim Sung-kyu
- Released: March 29, 2021
- Genre: K-pop
- Length: 11:11
- Language: Korean
- Label: Woollim
- Producer: Kim Jong-wan

Kim Sung-kyu chronology
Inside Me (2020)	Won't Forget You (2021)	Savior (2022)

Singles from Won't Forget You
- 1. "Hush" Released: March 29, 2021

Won't Forget You is the first single album by South Korean singer Kim Sung-kyu. It was released on March 29, 2021, by Woollim Entertainment and distributed by Kakao Entertainment. It marked Kim's final album with the agency after the expiration of his contract and departure from the label. Following a series of photo and video teasers, Won't Forget You and the lead single "Hush" were simultaneously released. The album peaked at number fourteen on South Korea's national Circle Album Chart and has shifted over 11,000 copies since its release.

== Music ==
All songs on Won't Forget You were penned, composed, and produced by Nell's Kim Jong-wan. The record opens with "Hush", a pop number about unspoken strong attractions and emotions. The track utilizes an analog synthesizer, piano, and acoustic and electric guitars. On "You", Kim sings over a plain guitar and drums. The lyrics describe the instant everything improves by just being with someone. "My Day" deals with a memory ingrained in a person's head that affects one's daily life. The track is led by Kim's layered vocals.

== Release and promotion ==
After eleven years with Woollim Entertainment, Kim decided to not renew his contract with the agency upon its expiration on March 6, 2021. On March 20, 2021, the company posted an image of a stamped envelope and a postcard adorned with purple flowers, announcing Won't Forget You as Kim's final album with the label. Two concept photos were posted four days in a row from the following day: the first pair revealed Kim's ash-colored hair. In the second set, he sported an oversized hoodie in one photo, while the other showed him sat under a spotlight in a chic appearance. In the third batch, Kim is seen donning a blue jacket with yellow pants and wearing a navy suit while lying on the ground. The final bundle presented him clothed in a white suit with a patterned shirt, as well as a photo of him under red lights staring at the viewer. A concept trailer was uploaded on March 25 and an album preview video followed one day prior to its release. Won't Forget You and its lead single "Hush" were concurrently issued on March 29.

== Critical reception and commercial performance ==
Writing for online music magazine IZM, Kim Do-yeon rated "Hush" two and a half stars out of five. He commended the track for its production and vocal performance, but lamented Kim Jong-wan's pervasive influence over the song as it "blurs" Kim Sung-kyu's presence.

On the chart dated March 28 – April 3, 2021, Won't Forget You debuted at number fourteen on South Korea's national Circle Album Chart. By the end of March, the single album shifted 11,357 units domestically.

== Track listing ==
Won't Forget You
No.	Title	Lyrics	Music	Arrangement	Length
1.	"Hush"	Kim Jong-wan	Kim Jong-wan, Spaceboy	Kim Jong-wan, Spaceboy	3:42
2.	"You"	Kim Jong-wan	Kim Jong-wan	Kim Jong-wan	3:50
3.	"My Day" (나의 하루; Na-eui Haru)	Kim Jong-wan	Kim Jong-wan	Kim Jong-wan	3:39
Total length:					11:11

== Chart ==
Chart (2021)	Peak position
South Korean Albums (Circle)	14
