= Singderella =

- Promotional poster
- Genre: Variety; Music
- Written by: Noh Yoon; Min Ji-yeon; Lee Kyung-a; Song Yeo-min; Lee Eun-mi; Park Na-ra; Choi Se-young; Jang Ji-yoon
- Directed by: Moon Hee-san; Park Jung-yeon; Jung Keuk-in; Joo Jung-yeon; Ha Bo-mi
- Presented by: Lee Soo-geun; Moon Hee-joon; Kim Hee-chul; Kim Sung-kyu
- Country of origin: South Korea
- Original language: Korean
- No. of seasons: 2
- No. of episodes: 20

Production
- Executive producer: Jung Hee-uk
- Producer: Kim Jin
- Running time: 1h 40m

Original release
- Network: Channel A Channel A Plus
- Release: November 10, 2016 – March 31, 2017

Singderella (Korean: 싱데렐라) is a South Korean variety show. The show was originally aired every Thursday at 23:00 (KST) on Channel A, but changed to air every Friday at 23:00 (KST) as of January 13, 2017.

== Cast ==
Season 1

- Kang Sung-yeon
- Kim Tae-woo
- Kim Hee-chul
- Moon Hee-joon
- Lee Soo-geun
- Choi Sung-keuk
- Han Suk-joon

Season 2

- Lee Soo-geun
- Moon Hee-joon
- Kim Hee-chul
- Kim Sung-kyu

Special Hosts

- Leeteuk (Super Junior) (Ep. 10)
- Lee Sang-min (Ep. 15-16)

== Format ==
Originally, after receiving the viewers' stories, and according to the story, the cast try to guess their ranks in Karaoke. But as of February 24, 2017, the show's concept changed and the number of cast decreased to four with three originals Lee Soo-geun, Moon Hee-joon, Kim Hee-chul and new addition Kim Sung-kyu.

The show's second season concept is that the cast and their special guests battle it out through a singing competition, where the winning performers are rewarded with the ingredients needed to make late night snacks.

== List of episodes and guests ==
| Episode # | Air Date | Guest(s) | Notes | AGB Nielsen ratings |
Season 1
2016
| 1 | November 10, 2016 | Chae Yeon, Sunwoo Sun | | 0.757% |
| 2 | November 17, 2016 | Kim Jung-min, Yoo Sung-eun | | 0.793% |
| 3 | November 24, 2016 | Cho Jang Hyuk, Oh Jung-yeon | | 0.937% |
| 4 | December 1, 2016 | Boom, Ivy | | 0.890% |
| 5 | December 8, 2016 | Kang Ye-bin, Kwak Jung Eun, Lee Chang-min (2AM) | | 0.809% |
| 6 | December 15, 2016 | Kim Jong-min, Bbaek Ga (Koyote) | | 0.996% |
| 7 | December 22, 2016 | Byun Jin-sub, JeA (Brown Eyed Girls) | | 0.871% |
| 8 | December 29, 2016 | Kim Jong-seo, Kim Jung-mo (TRAX) | | —N/a |
2017
| 9 | January 5, 2017 | Kim Heung-gook, Park Hyun-bin | Special Guest: Choi Hyun-Wo | 0.840% |
| 10 | January 12, 2017 | Park Nam-jung, Kim Wan-sun, | Special MC: Leeteuk (Super Junior) in place of Lee Soo-geun Special Guest: Jo Hye-ryun | 0.730% |
| 11 | January 20, 2017 | Lee Jun-hyeok, Kangnam, Jisook | | 0.560% |
| 12 | January 27, 2017 | UJi (BESTie), Jang Dong-min, Kim Hyun-uk | | 0.741% |
| 13 | February 3, 2017 | Shindong (Super Junior), Niel (Teen Top), Lee Ji-yeon | | 0.499% |
| 14 | February 10, 2017 | Hyoyeon (Girls' Generation), Kim Jung-ah, Lee Ji-hye | | 0.577% |
Season 2
2017
| 15 | February 24, 2017 | Red Velvet (Except: Joy) | First episode of new MC Kim Sung-kyu Special MC: Lee Sang-min, in place of Moon Hee-joon | 0.490% |
| 16 | March 3, 2017 | Lovelyz | Special MC: Lee Sang-min | —N/a |
| 17 | March 10, 2017 | GFriend | | 0.446% |
| 18 | March 17, 2017 | Sonamoo, April | | 0.281% |
| 19 | March 24, 2017 | GOT7 (Except: Jackson) | | —N/a |
| 20 | March 31, 2017 | Hello Venus | | 0.499% |

- Note that the show airs on a cable channel (pay TV), which plays part in its slower uptake and relatively small audience share when compared to programs broadcast (FTA) on public networks such as KBS, SBS, MBC or EBS.
