= Radiant Office =

2017 South Korean TV series

- Also known as: Self-Radiation Office; Self-Dazzling Office Self-Stunning Office
- Hangul: 자체발광 오피스
- RR: Jachebalgwang opiseu
- MR: Chach'ebalgwang op'isŭ
- Genre: Romantic comedy Workplace drama
- Written by: Jung Hoe-hyun
- Directed by: Jung Ji-in, Park Sang-hoon
- Starring: Go Ah-sung; Ha Seok-jin; Kim Dong-wook; Lee Dong-hwi; Lee Ho-won
- Country of origin: South Korea
- Original language: Korean
- No. of episodes: 16

Production
- Executive producer: Han Hee
- Producer: Yoo Hyun-joong
- Running time: 60 minutes
- Production company: MBC Drama Production Division

Original release
- Network: MBC
- Release: March 15 – May 4, 2017

Radiant Office (Korean: 자체발광 오피스; RR: Jachebalgwang opiseu; lit. Self-Dazzling Office) is a 2017 South Korean television series starring Go Ah-sung, Ha Seok-jin, Kim Dong-wook, Lee Dong-hwi, and Lee Ho-won. The series is written by a rookie screenwriter who won the 2016 MBC TV Drama Screenplay Competition in Miniseries category. It aired on MBC from March 15 to May 4, 2017 on Wednesdays and Thursdays at 22:00 (KST) for 16 episodes.

== Synopsis ==
Eun Ho-won faces repeat rejections in her job search until despair drives her to attempt suicide. At the hospital, she learns she might be terminally-ill, but then at the same time, she also finally succeeds in getting hired. Thinking she has nothing to lose, she tackles her job and life with new perspectives. Her superior at work, Seo Woo-jin, considers her a pain in the neck. They become a bickering pair.

== Cast ==
=== Main characters ===
- Go Ah-sung as Eun Ho-won

A 28-year-old woman who never succeeds at getting a steady job. Tired and sick of her life and multiple part-time jobs she does, she tries to commit suicide. She gets both happy and sad news at the same time: she might be terminally ill but also finally succeeds in getting hired as a contractual employee. Thinking she has nothing to lose, she tackles her job and life with new perspectives and bolder attitude.

- Ha Seok-jin as Seo Woo-jin

A 38-year-old man who is the Head of Marketing team. He is an elite workaholic with perfect qualifications and work results. But he has uncompromising personality and sharp tongue, which often makes him at odds with his coworkers.

- Kim Dong-wook as Seo Hyun

A 34-year-old emergency physician, he was the one who takes care of Ho-won when she was brought to the hospital after her attempted suicide. He keep tabs on her ever since and after he knows she works at his family's company, he becomes her secret guardian.

- Lee Dong-hwi as Do Ki-taek

A 32-year-old man who has been failed to pass national civil service exam a few times, which resulted in him lacking professional work experience. Despite being abandoned by his materialistic girlfriend, he is still a romanticist at heart.

- Lee Ho-won as Jang Kang-ho

A 28-year-old man who comes from a wealthy family in Gangnam. He has received the best education and upbringing that money can buy. He suffers from panic disorder, which resulted in multiple failures of job interviews.

=== Supporting characters ===
- Kim Byung-choon as Heo Gu-dong
- Han Sun-hwa as Ha Ji-na
- Kwon Hae-hyo as Park Sang-man
- Jang Shin-young as Jo Seok-kyung
- Oh Dae-hwan as Lee Yong-jae
- Kim Yu-mi as Lee Hyo-ri
- Kim Hee-chan as Oh Jae-min
- FeelDog as Eun Ho-jae
- Choi Beom-ho as Seo Tae-woo
- Lee Yoon-sang as Han Jung-tae
- Park Se-wan as Lee Kkot-bi
- Im Ye-jin as Mrs. Eun
- Shin Dong-mi as Jo Seok-kyung's ex-husband's fiancée

== Ratings ==
- In the table below, the blue numbers represent the lowest ratings and the red numbers represent the highest ratings.
- NR denotes that the drama did not rank in the top 20 daily programs on that date.

Episode #	Date	Average audience share			
Episode #	Date	TNmS Ratings		AGB Nielsen	
Episode #	Date	Nationwide	Seoul National Capital Area	Nationwide	Seoul National Capital Area
1	March 15, 2017	3.8% (N/R)	4.1% (N/R)	3.8% (N/R)	4.2% (N/R)
2	March 16, 2017	4.1% (N/R)	4.9% (N/R)	3.9% (N/R)	4.7% (N/R)
3	March 22, 2017	4.4% (N/R)	5.0% (N/R)	3.8% (N/R)	4.4% (N/R)
4	March 23, 2017	4.6% (N/R)	5.4% (N/R)	5.2% (N/R)	6.0% (N/R)
5	March 29, 2017	4.6% (N/R)	5.2% (N/R)	5.4% (N/R)	6.0% (N/R)
6	March 30, 2017	4.9% (N/R)	5.4% (N/R)	6.0% (N/R)	6.5% (N/R)
7	April 5, 2017	6.0% (N/R)	6.3% (N/R)	7.4% (18th)	7.7% (14th)
8	April 6, 2017	5.8% (N/R)	5.9% (N/R)	7.3% (19th)	7.4% (18th)
9	April 12, 2017	5.6% (N/R)	6.3% (N/R)	5.9% (N/R)	6.6% (N/R)
10	April 13, 2017	6.2% (N/R)	7.3% (N/R)	7.1% (19th)	8.2% (18th)
11	April 19, 2017	4.9% (N/R)	5.4% (N/R)	4.4% (N/R)	4.9% (N/R)
12	April 20, 2017	5.7% (N/R)	5.9% (N/R)	6.7% (20th)	7.0% (17th)
13	April 26, 2017	6.0% (N/R)	6.4% (N/R)	6.8% (17th)	7.7% (11th)
14	April 27, 2017	5.6% (N/R)	6.5% (N/R)	6.8% (18th)	7.7% (12th)
15	May 3, 2017	5.3% (N/R)	6.2% (N/R)	6.4% (17th)	7.3% (12th)
16	May 4, 2017	5.5% (N/R)	6.0% (N/R)	7.0% (14th)	7.5% (11th)
Average		5.2%	5.8%	5.9%	6.5%

== Awards and nominations ==
Year	Award	Category	Nominee	Result
2017	36th MBC Drama Awards	Drama of the Year	Radiant Office	Nominated
2017	36th MBC Drama Awards	Top Excellence Award, Actor in a Miniseries	Ha Seok-jin	Nominated
2017	36th MBC Drama Awards	Top Excellence Award, Actress in a Miniseries	Go Ah-sung	Nominated
2017	36th MBC Drama Awards	Excellence Award, Actor in a Miniseries	Kim Dong-wook	Nominated
2017	36th MBC Drama Awards	Excellence Award, Actor in a Miniseries	Lee Dong-hwi	Nominated
2017	36th MBC Drama Awards	Excellence Award, Actress in a Miniseries	Han Sun-hwa	Won
2017	36th MBC Drama Awards	Golden Acting Award, Actor in a Miniseries	Kwon Hae-hyo	Nominated
2017	36th MBC Drama Awards	Golden Acting Award, Actress in a Miniseries	Jang Shin-young	Won
2017	36th MBC Drama Awards	Best New Actor	Lee Ho-won	Nominated

== Original soundtrack ==
=== Part 1 ===
No.	Title	Artist	Length
1.	"101"	Ho Yoon (of Closet)	3:13
2.	"101" (Inst.)		3:13
Total length:			6:26

=== Part 2 ===
No.	Title	Artist	Length
1.	"For Me"	Gyepy	3:50
2.	"For Me" (Inst.)		3:50
Total length:			7:40

=== Part 3 ===
No.	Title	Artist	Length
1.	"Stunning" (자체발광)	Junggigo	3:19
2.	"Stunning" (Inst.)		3:19
Total length:			6:38

=== Part 4 ===
No.	Title	Artist	Length
1.	"It Would Be Love" (사랑이겠죠)	ROO	3:47
2.	"It Would Be Love" (Inst.)		3:47
Total length:			7:34

=== Part 5 ===
No.	Title	Artist	Length
1.	"Bittersweet Bliss" (아름다운 이야기)	Hyun Jin-ju	3:47
2.	"Bittersweet Bliss" (Inst.)		3:47
Total length:			7:34

=== Part 6 ===
No.	Title	Artist	Length
1.	"101"	Lee Won-suk (Daybreak)	3:25
2.	"101" (Inst.)		3:25
Total length:			6:50

=== Part 7 ===
No.	Title	Artist	Length
1.	"Come to Me" (내게 와요)	Lee Tae-il (Block B)	3:51
2.	"Come to Me" (Inst.)		3:51
Total length:			7:42

== International broadcast ==
- In Vietnam: Danet.vn & FPT Play (streaming online 3 hours after Korea)
- In Peru: the series aired on August 28, 2018 at 6:50 pm
