= Fly Again (EP) =

EP by Infinite H (Infinite)
- Released: January 26, 2015
- Recorded: Seoul, South Korea
- Genre: K-pop, Hip Hop
- Label: Woollim Entertainment

Infinite H (Infinite) chronology
Fly High (2013)	Fly Again (2015)

Singles from Fly Again
- 1. "예뻐 (Pretty)" Released: January 25, 2015

Fly Again is the second and final EP by South Korean hip-hop duo, Infinite H. The EP was released on January 26, 2015, in South Korea and it consists of a total of seven tracks, including the promotional track, Pretty.

== Background ==
After releasing video and image teasers in January, the duo released the promotional track, 예뻐 (Pretty) on January 25 prior to the release of the EP. The music video for the song was also released through Woollim Entertainment's official YouTube channel on the same day.

== Composition ==
The EP consists of seven tracks in total with Hoya and Dongwoo participating in the composition of several songs on the EP. The title track is a dubstep song serving as an intro track. The promotional track, 예뻐 (Pretty) is an upbeat love song about how in love they are with such a beautiful girl that they even hate it when she looks away from them. The third track, 어디안가 (Aren't You Going Somewhere?) is a song with the influence of '80s pop and features vocalist Yang Da Il. The fourth track, 부딪쳐 (Bump) is a song with a R&B rhythm labelmate, Lovelyz's Su-jeong. The fifth track, 바빠서 (Sorry I'm Busy) featuring Swings and Champagne, is a song directed to their haters, with the occasional disses towards their haters in the lyrics. The sixth track, 지킬 앤 하이드 (Jekyll & Hyde) is a song with a jazz sound about post-breakup feelings featuring the singer Taewan. The last track, 니가 미치지 않고서야 (As Long as You're Not Crazy) is a song about catching their lovers cheating and features Sanchez from Phantom.

== Music video ==
The music video for Pretty was released on January 25, 2015. It shows the duo playing a prosecutor and lawyer in a court room interrogating and vying for the attention of the female co-star. The pair recount embarrassing "cases" with the girl that includes the guys getting into a car crash and spilling coffee on their love interest.

== Track listing ==
No.	Title	Lyrics	Music	Arrangement	Length
1.	"Fly Again (Feat. DJ IT )"
2.	"예뻐" (Pretty)	9999, Dongwoo, Hoya	9999, Hoya	9999	03:25
3.	"어디안가" (Aren't You Going Somewhere? (Feat. Yang Da Il))	Rhymer, Dongwoo, Hoya	Lee Hyun Do, eniac, Ki Gyeon	Lee Hyun Do, eniac	03:29
4.	"부딪쳐" (Bump (feat. Sujeong of Lovelyz))	Rhymer, Dongwoo, Hoya	ASSBRASS, Ryhmer	ASSBRASS	03:59
5.	"바빠서" (Sorry I'm Busy (feat. Swings, Champagne of Champagne & Candle))	Dongwoo, Hoya, Swings, Champagne	ASSBRASS, Champagne	ASSBRASS	03:51
6.	"지킬 앤 하이드" (Jekyll & Hyde (Feat. Taewan))	Rhymer, Dongwoo, Hoya	ASSBRASS, Rhymer, Hoya	ASSBRASS	03:31
7.	"니가 미치지 않고서야" (As Long as You're Not Crazy (Feat. Sanchez of Phantom))		Ri Si, XEPY	Ri Si	03:21

== Charts ==
=== Album ===
Chart	Peak position
Gaon Weekly album chart	1
Gaon Weekly domestic album chart	1
Gaon Monthly album chart	3

=== Singles ===
Song	Peak chart position	
Song	KOR	KOR
Song	Gaon Chart	K-Pop Billboard
"Pretty"	2	-

=== Sales and certifications ===
Chart	Amount
Gaon physical sales	33,143+

== Release history ==
Country	Date	Distributing label	Format
South Korea	January 26, 2015	Woollim Entertainment, LOEN Entertainment	Digital download
South Korea	January 26, 2015	Woollim Entertainment, LOEN Entertainment	CD
