= Another Me (Kim Sung-kyu EP) =

EP by Kim Sung-kyu
- Released: November 19, 2012
- Genre: K-pop; Pop rock
- Length: 21:04
- Language: Korean
- Label: Woollim Entertainment

Kim Sung-kyu chronology
Another Me (2012)	27 (2015)

Singles from Another Me
- 1. "Shine" Released: November 7, 2012; 2. "60초" Released: November 19, 2012

Another Me is the debut extended play by South Korean singer, Kim Sung-kyu. It was released on November 19, 2012 by Woollim Entertainment. Kim Sungkyu releasing pre-release track "Shine" on November 7 before this album release on November 19.

Although with a short promotion, the album was well received and became the top selling physical album for the month of November with 62,958 copies sold. More than half of the album sales were from international fans.

== Track listing ==
Another Me
No.	Title	Lyrics	Music	Arrangement	Length
1.	"Another Me (Intro)"		Han Bo-ram	Han Bo-ram	1:07
2.	"60 Seconds" (60초; 60-cho)	Song Soo-yoon	Han Jae-ho, Kim Seung-soo, YU	Yue, Hong Seung-hyu	3:34
3.	"I Need You"	Lee Jung-hoon	Lee Jung-hoon	Lee Jung-hoon	3:43
4.	"Only Tears" (Acoustic Ver.)	Song Soo-yoon	Han Jae-ho, Kim Seung-soo	Han Bo-ram	3:52
5.	"Shine"	Kim Jong-wan	Kim Jong-wan	Kim Jong-wan	4:36
6.	"41 Days" (41일; 41-il)	Lee Jung-hoon, Kim Sung-kyu	Lee Jung-hoon	Lee Jung-hoon	4:11
Total length:					21:04

== Chart ==
=== Album chart ===
Country	Chart	Peak position
South Korea	Gaon Weekly album chart	1

== Sales and certifications ==
Gaon Sales
2012	2013	2014	2015	2016 March 31 (Ongoing)	Total
70,552	13,283	6,098	3,749	624	94,306
