= Fly High (EP) =

EP by Infinite H (Infinite)
- Released: January 11, 2013
- Recorded: Seoul, South Korea
- Genre: K-pop, Hip Hop, R&B
- Label: Woollim Entertainment, LOEN Entertainment

Infinite H (Infinite) chronology
Fly High (2013)	Fly Again (2015)

Singles from Fly High
- 1. "Special Girl" Released: January 10, 2013; 2. "Without You" Released: January 28, 2013

Fly High is the debut EP by South Korean boy group Infinite's sub-unit Infinite H. The EP was released on January 11 and immediately topped the charts upon release.

== Background ==
After a series of image and video teasers, the music video for promotional track "Special Girl" was released on January 10, 2013 on Woollim Entertainment's official YouTube channel and following the music video's release, the duo also performed the song and their follow-up track "Without You" on M! Countdown on the same day. Following the release of the music video, the EP was officially released on January 11, 2013.

== Composition ==
Focusing mainly on the genre hip hop, Infinite H (Dongwoo and Hoya) collaborated with many different artists, including various well-known hip hop composers and rappers such as Primary, Zion.T, Bumkey, Paloalto, Vida Loca, and more. The album's title track, "Fly High," features labelmate Baby Soul, who was featured on the sub-unit's first ever track "Crying" as well.

== Music video ==
The music video for "Special Girl" was uploaded onto Woollim Entertainment's official YouTube channel on January 10, 2013 and on January 28, 2013, the music video for the follow-up track, "Without You" was also uploaded onto YouTube.

== Promotion ==
Infinite H began their promotions by performing their title track and their follow-up song, "Without You" on January 10, 2013 episode of Mnet's M! Countdown on the same day when the music video for "Special Girl" was released. The duo also performed on Music Bank and Show! Music Core on January 11 and 12 respectively. They continued to perform on various music programs to promote the EP.

== Track listing ==
No.	Title	Lyrics	Music	Arrangement	Length
1.	"Victorious Way"	Dead'p	Vida Loca	Vida Loca	2:39
2.	"Special Girl (Feat. Bumkey)"	Beenzino, Bumkey	Primary	Primary	4:08
3.	"니가 없을 때 (Feat. Zion.T)" (Without You (Feat. Zion.T))	Zion.T, Lil Boi, Louie	Zion.T	Zion.T, Primary, Gray	3:25
4.	"못해 (feat. 개코 of Dynamic Duo)" (Can't Do It (feat. Gaeko of Dynamic Duo))	개코	Primary, 개코	Primary	4:09
5.	"Fly High (Feat. Baby Soul of Lovelyz)"	Paloalto	Primary	Primary	3:41
Total length:					18:06

== Charts ==
=== Album ===
Chart	Peak position
South Korea Weekly Album Chart (Gaon)	5
South Korea Yearly Album Chart (Gaon)	23
US World Albums (Billboard)	8

== Sales ==
Gaon Album Chart	Amount
2013 Yearly Total	93,884

== Release history ==
Country	Date	Distributing label	Format
South Korea	January 11, 2013	Woollim Entertainment, LOEN Entertainment	Digital download
South Korea	January 11, 2013	Woollim Entertainment, LOEN Entertainment	CD
