= Welcome to Convenience Store =

South Korean webcomic and animated sitcom

- Logo featuring main characters. The images are from left to right, Park Jeom-jang, Kang Min-jun, Im Eun-ah, and Kim Hye-yeon.

와라! 편의점 RR: Wara! pyeonuijeom MR: Wara! p'yŏnŭijŏm
- Genre: Comedy
- Author: Ji Kang-min
- Publisher: WEBTOON
- Original run: February 2008

Welcome to Convenience Store (Korean: 와라! 편의점) is a South Korean webtoon created by Ji Kang-min. The webtoon began in February 2008 and received an award at the Seoul International Cartoon and Animation Festival that same year. A paperback version was released on October 23, 2008.

Welcome to Convenience Store was adapted into multiple animated series, as well as a mobile game distributed by Kakao. Characters from the webtoon have appeared in a variety of media and merchandise.

== Development ==
Photographer Ji Kang-min started drawing Welcome to Convenience Store in 2008, thinking it would be nice to release a story based on one of the most well-known settings. Kang-min gets a large amount of fanmail containing stories and concerns from retail employees, some of which he introduces to the webtoon. Kang-min stated in 2010 that the webtoon doesn't make him much money, which was his reason to expand to different types of media, such as animation.

In an interview with The Korea Times, Kang-min stated that when he started drawing cartoons, he overworked himself as there was a large amount of labor to do. During this period, he spent two days per week writing up scripts, and the other five days to draw the cartoon itself. As of 2015, he only needs two days to draw the comic itself, as he no longer has to use up his time with routine processes. For example, he no longer needs to draw backgrounds, as he adapted 3D-rendered backgrounds. Kang-min stated that his life motto is "not to skip a meal and not to pass a night without sleep," and that he is currently "fully benefiting from my digitalized environment."

In 2015, Kang-min started a new webtoon series titled The Commute Family, which focuses on the everyday events in public transportation. The new series is published on KakaoPage rather than Naver.

== Summary ==
Welcome to Convenience Store chronicles the everyday, yet silly events at a fictional South Korean convenience store. Though the webtoon is purely episodic in nature, it features a recurring set of part-time workers. Kang-min initially intended to focus primarily on the store's employees, but after receiving positive responses from his readers, he shifted the focus of the webtoon more to the customers.

== Other media ==
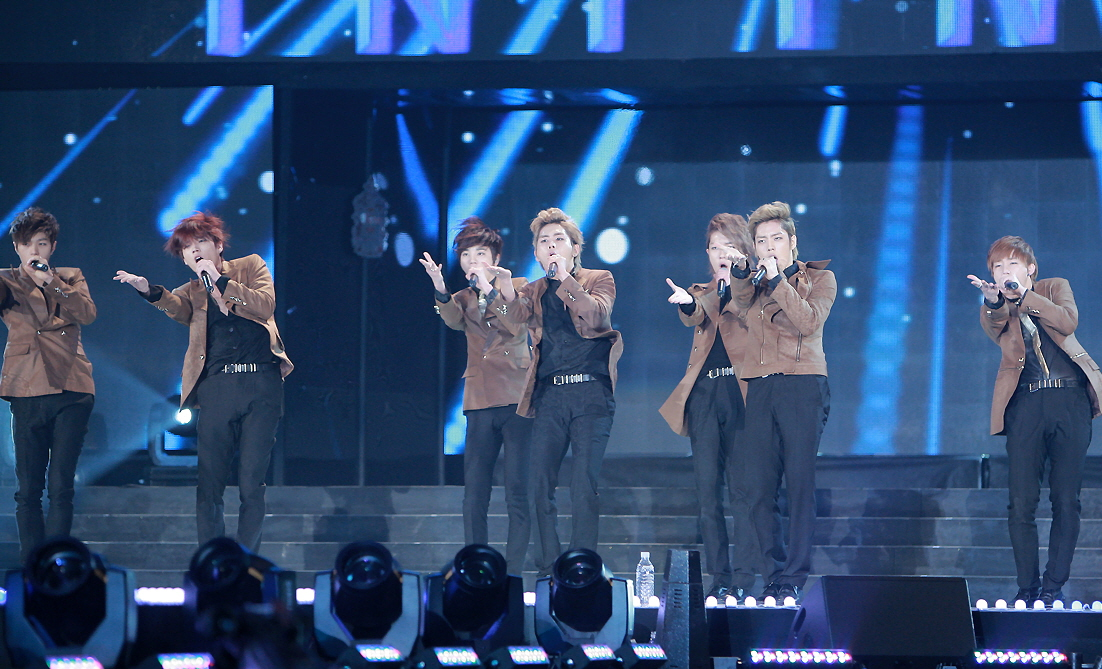
The 2012 animated adaptation of Welcome to Convenience Store features voice work and music by the members of Infinite.

In 2010, Yoo Se-yoon of the comedy music duo UV revealed "Convenience", a music video featuring characters from Welcome to Convenience Store. Convenience store chain 7-Eleven featured characters from the webtoon on its products, and some of the characters have been realized as toys by Korean toy manufacturer Oxford Blocks.

=== Animation ===
A web animation based on Welcome to Convenience Store was produced in October 2009. Published on Naver and later broadcast on Tooniverse, the animated series was intended for promotional purposes rather than direct profit, and it was the first web animation based on a webtoon, or "Ostuni".

An animated television series based on Welcome to Convenience Store was announced in 2010, and eventually produced by cable channel Tooniverse in 2012. The series was produced as part of the 2010 "Annie Challenge" and was aired as 20 episodes, each 30 minutes long. Members of the South Korean boy band Infinite appeared in the series as guest stars, as well as singing the opening theme "Always Open".

=== Mobile game ===
Welcome to Convenience Store was adapted into a mobile game in 2014, distributed through KakaoTalk. The video game, titled Work It! Convenience Store, quickly became one of the top-selling games on Google Play. The game won the "Best Korean Mobile Game Business" in 2014. Work It! exceeded 500,000 downloads in the first weeks of its launch, and has been downloaded by over five million people as of March 2016.

In Work It!, the player takes on the role of manager of a convenience store, as which he can decorate the building, purchase wares, and perform a variety of chores. Through the course of the game, a player can eventually create their own "unique" convenience store. Work It! includes various intricate systems such as street vendors and plant food that allow players to micromanage their store. The game also features various mechanics that allows the player to assist or compete against other players.

== Reception ==
Welcome to Convenience Store received an award at the Seoul International Cartoon and Animation Festival in 2008. Characters from the webtoon were exhibited as a pop-up store in the Korean Comics Museum in January 2015.

In 2010, Kang-min's webtoon spurred some political controversy when he published a page featuring a girl apprehending a shoplifter based on the way he looked. Kang-min apologized shortly after, and stated that he would give "more careful consideration when selecting the material" to use in the webtoon in the future.
