= Lovelyz discography =

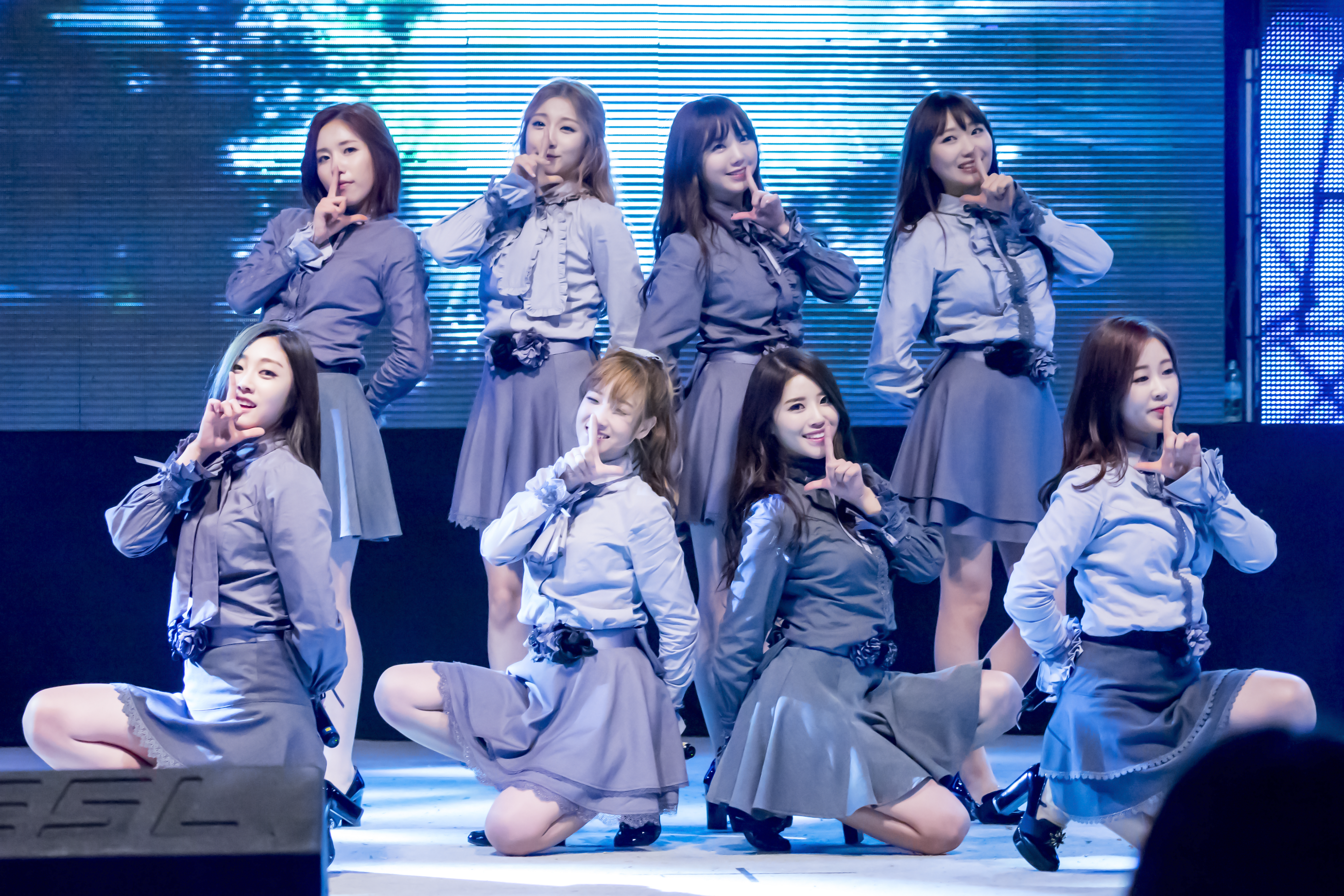
- Lovelyz on September 18, 2016
- Studio albums: 2
- EPs: 7
- Live albums: 4
- Compilation albums: 1
- Singles: 15
- Music videos: 16
- Reissues: 2
- Single albums: 1

The discography of the South Korean girl group Lovelyz consists of two studio albums, four live albums, one compilation album, two reissues, seven extended plays, one single album, and fifteen singles.

Lovelyz debuted in 2014 with their studio album Girls' Invasion, which was later re-released as Hi~ in 2015. Six months later, they released a first EP, Lovelyz8 (2015) and released a single album Lovelinus, three months later. In 2016, Lovelyz only released their second EP, A New Trilogy. Their second studio album, R U Ready? (2017) was later re-released as Now, We (2017). Six months later, they released a third EP, Fall in Lovelyz (2017). In 2018, their fourth EP, Heal, was released. Seven months later, their fifth EP Sanctuary released. In 2019, their sixth EP, Once Upon a Time was released. A year later, their seventh EP, Unforgettable was released.

== Albums ==
=== Studio albums ===
Title	Album details	Peak chart positions		Sales
Title	Album details	KOR	JPN	Sales
Girls' Invasion	Released: November 17, 2014; Label: Woollim Entertainment, LOEN Entertainment; Formats: CD, digital download	7	—	KOR: 13,324
R U Ready?	Released: February 27, 2017; Label: Woollim Entertainment, CJ E&M Music; Formats: CD, digital download	2	44	KOR: 44,874; JPN: 1,756
"—" denotes releases that did not chart or were not released in that region.

=== Live albums ===
Title	Album details
2017 Lovelyz Summer Concert [Alwayz]	Released: January 25, 2018; Label: Woollim Entertainment, CJ E&M; Formats: DVD, Blu-ray
2018 Lovelyz in Winterland 2	Released: October 16, 2018; Label: Woollim Entertainment, Kakao M; Formats: DVD, Blu-ray
2019 Lovelyz in Winterland 3	Released: August 6, 2019; Label: Woollim Entertainment, Stone Music; Formats: Blu-ray, Kihno
2019 Lovelyz Summer Concert [Alwayz 2]	Released: March 6, 2020; Label: Woollim Entertainment, Stone Music; Formats: Blu-ray, Kit Video

=== Compilation albums ===
Title	Album details	Peak chart positions	Sales
Title	Album details	KOR	Sales
Muse on Music	Released: September 11, 2018; Label: Woollim Entertainment, Kakao M; Formats: CD, digital download	9	KOR: 6,714

=== Reissues ===
Title	Album details	Peak chart positions	Sales
Title	Album details	KOR	Sales
Hi~	Released: March 3, 2015; Label: Woollim Entertainment, LOEN Entertainment; Formats: CD, digital download	4	KOR: 19,654
Now, We	Released: May 2, 2017; Label: Woollim Entertainment, CJ E&M Music; Formats: CD, digital download	1	KOR: 24,862

=== Single albums ===
Title	Album details	Peak chart positions	Sales
Title	Album details	KOR	Sales
Lovelinus	Released: December 7, 2015; Label: Woollim Entertainment, LOEN Entertainment; Formats: CD, digital download	7	KOR: 15,768

== Extended plays ==
Title	Details	Peak chart positions		Sales
Title	Details	KOR	JPN	Sales
Lovelyz8	Released: September 30, 2015; Label: Woollim Entertainment, LOEN Entertainment; Formats: CD, digital download	2	—	KOR: 23,213; JPN: 829
A New Trilogy	Released: April 25, 2016; Label: Woollim Entertainment, LOEN Entertainment; Formats: CD, digital download	5	—	KOR: 28,985
Fall in Lovelyz	Released: November 14, 2017; Label: Woollim Entertainment, CJ E&M Music; Formats: CD, digital download	4	—	KOR: 43,687; JPN: 3,327
Heal	Released: April 23, 2018; Label: Woollim Entertainment, Kakao M (Note: LOEN Entertainment became Kakao M on March 23, 2018.); Formats: CD, digital download	2	33	KOR: 42,791; JPN: 4,794
Sanctuary	Released: November 26, 2018; Label: Woollim Entertainment, Kakao M; Formats: CD, digital download	8	26	KOR: 43,386; JPN: 6,517
Once Upon a Time	Released: May 20, 2019; Label: Woollim Entertainment, Kakao M; Formats: CD, digital download	6	25	KOR: 54,419; JPN: 2,046
Unforgettable	Released: September 1, 2020; Label: Woollim Entertainment, Kakao M; Formats: CD, digital download	5	—	KOR: 35,724; JPN: 760
"—" denotes releases that did not chart or were not released in that region.

== Singles ==
=== As lead artist ===
Title	Year	Peak chart positions		Sales (Note: Gaon Chart no longer releases download sales figures from January 2018 onwards.) (DL)	Album
Title	Year	KOR	KOR Hot	Sales (DL)	Album
"Candy Jelly Love"	2014	48	—	KOR: 81,979	Girls' Invasion
"Hi~" (안녕)	2015	23	—	KOR: 406,093	Hi~
"Ah-Choo"	2015	28	—	KOR: 1,186,046	Lovelyz8
"For You" (그대에게)	2015	33	—	KOR: 158,103	Lovelinus
"Destiny" (나의 지구)	2016	7	—	KOR: 293,878	A New Trilogy
"WoW!"	2017	12	—	KOR: 148,494	R U Ready?
"Now, We" (지금, 우리)	2017	24	31	KOR: 140,404	Now, We
"Twinkle" (종소리)	2017	42	67	KOR: 65,185	Fall in Lovelyz
"That Day" (그날의 너)	2018	42	23	—	Heal
"Wag-Zak" (여름 한 조각)	2018	95	92	—	Non-album single
"Lost N Found" (찾아가세요)	2018	71	78	—	Sanctuary
"Beautiful Days" (그 시절 우리가 사랑했던 우리)	2019	92	42	—	Once Upon a Time
"Obliviate"	2020	93	48	—	Unforgettable
"November" (닿으면, 너)	2024	— (Note: "November" did not enter the Circle Digital Chart but peaked at number 24 on the component Download Chart.)	—	—	Non-album singles
"Dear"	2024	— (Note: "Dear" did not enter the Circle Digital Chart but peaked at number 54 on the component Download Chart.)	—	—	Non-album singles
"—" denotes releases that did not chart or were not released in that region.

=== Other releases ===
Title	Year	Peak chart positions	Album
Title	Year	KOR DL	Album
As lead artist
"Take Me Somewhere"	2017	—	Fever Festival 2017
"Just Like Now" (지금 이대로)	2018	—	tvN 300 x NC Fever Music
Collaborations
"Relay" (이어달리기) (with Infinite's Kim Sung-kyu, Golden Child, Rocket Punch, Drippin)	2020	119	Non-album singles
"Under the Sky of Suncheon" (Note: Credited under Lovelyz, but sung by Baby Soul and Sujeong.) (순천의 하늘 아래에서) (with Golden Child (Note: Credited under Golden Child, but sung by Tag and Joochan.))	2020	—	Non-album singles
Soundtrack appearances
"Promise" (약속해줘)	2020	—	The Haunted House: Ghost Ball Double X OST (season 3)
"Loving You" (Note: Credited as a song by Lovelyz, but sung by Baby Soul, Mijoo, and Jin.)	2020	—	Do Do Sol Sol La La Sol OST
"—" denotes releases that did not chart or were not released in that region.

== Other charted songs ==
Title	Year	Peak chart positions	Sales (DL)	Album
Title	Year	KOR	Sales (DL)	Album
"Good Night Like Yesterday" (어제처럼 굿나잇)	2014	40	KOR: 53,759	Girls' Invasion
"Amusement Park" (놀이공원)	2015	114	KOR: 20,231	Hi~
"Shooting Star" (작별하나)	2015	34	KOR: 70,309	Lovelyz8
"How To Be A Pretty Girl" (예쁜 여자가 되는 법)	2015	216	KOR: 11,249	Lovelyz8
"Sweet and Sour" (새콤달콤)	2015	219	KOR: 10,453	Lovelyz8
"Hug Me"	2015	220	KOR: 10,007	Lovelyz8
"Rapunzel" (라푼젤)	2015	253	KOR: 9,524	Lovelyz8
"Circle"	2015	172	KOR: 13,935	Lovelinus
"Bebe"	2015	187	KOR: 12,758	Lovelinus
"Bookmark" (책갈피)	2016	146	KOR: 19,913	A New Trilogy
"Dear You" (마음 (*취급주의))	2016	147	KOR: 18,950	A New Trilogy
"Baby Doll" (인형)	2016	161	KOR: 17,726	A New Trilogy
"Fondant" (퐁당)	2016	162	KOR: 17,921	A New Trilogy
"1cm"	2016	173	KOR: 16,754	A New Trilogy
"Cameo"	2017	— (Note: "Cameo" did not enter the Gaon Digital Chart, but appeared at no. 92 on the component Download chart.)	KOR: 17,567	R U Ready?
"Moonlight"	2019	— (Note: "Moonlight" did not enter the Gaon Digital Chart, but appeared at no. 92 on the component Download chart.)	—	Queendom Final Comeback Singles

== Music videos ==
Title	Year	Director
"어저처럼 굿나잇 (Good Night Like Yesterday)"	2014	Digipedi
"Candy Jelly Love"	2014	Digipedi
"안녕 (Hi~)"	2015	Digipedi
"작별하나 (Shooting Star)"	2015	Digipedi
"Ah-Choo"	2015	Digipedi
"그대에게 (For You)"	2015	Digipedi
"Destiny (나의 지구)"	2016	Digipedi
"WoW!"	2017	Digipedi
"지금, 우리 (Now, We)"	2017	Digipedi
"종소리 (Twinkle)"	2017	Hong Won-ki (Zanybros)
"그날의 너 (That Day)"	2018	Sunnyvisual
"여름 한 조각 (Wag-zak)"	2018	Sunnyvisual
"찾아가세요 (Lost N Found)"	2018	Sunnyvisual
"그 시절 우리가 사랑핬던 우리 (Beautiful Days)"	2019	Sunnyvisual
"Obliviate"	2020	Zanybros
"November"	2024	
