= List of awards and nominations received by Lovelyz =

Lovelyz awards and nominations
Awards and nominations
Award	Wins	Nominations
APAN Music Awards	0	2
Asia Artist Awards	4	10
Asia Model Awards	1	1
Asian Pop Music Awards	1	6
Gaon Chart Music Awards	0	1
Golden Disc Awards	2	10
Korean Culture Entertainment Awards	1	1
Melon Music Awards	0	6
MTV Europe Music Awards	1	2
Mnet Asian Music Awards	0	7
Seoul Music Awards	0	17
Soompi Awards	0	3
Soribada Best K-Music Awards	1	7

Totals (Note: Certain award groups do not simply award one winner. They acknowledge several different recipients, have runners-up, and have third place. Since this is a specific recognition and is different from losing an award, runner-up mentions are considered wins in this award tally. For simplification and to avoid errors, each award in this list has been presumed to have had a prior nomination.)
- Wins: 10
- Nominations: 67

This is a list of awards and nominations received by Lovelyz, a South Korean girl group formed in 2014 by Woollim Entertainment, As of 2021 the group received 10 awards.

== Awards and nominations ==
Name of the award ceremony, year presented, category, nominee of the award, and the result of the nomination
Award ceremony	Year	Category	Nominee / work	Result	Ref.
APAN Music Awards	2020	Idol Champ Fan's Pick – Group	Lovelyz	Nominated	
APAN Music Awards	2020	Idol Champ Global Pick – Group	Lovelyz	Nominated	
Asia Artist Awards	2016	Popularity Award – Singer	Lovelyz	Nominated	
Asia Artist Awards	2016	Rookie of the Year	Lovelyz	Won	
Asia Artist Awards	2017	Popularity Award – Singer	Lovelyz	Nominated	
Asia Artist Awards	2017	Best Musician - Female	Lovelyz	Won	
Asia Artist Awards	2017	Best Stage Performance	Lovelyz	Won	
Asia Artist Awards	2018	Popularity Award – Singer	Lovelyz	Nominated	
Asia Artist Awards	2019	Popularity Award – Singer	Lovelyz	Nominated	
Asia Artist Awards	2019	StarNews Popularity Award – Female Group	Lovelyz	Nominated	
Asia Artist Awards	2019	Rising Award - Singer	Lovelyz	Won	
Asia Artist Awards	2020	AAA x Choeaedol Popularity Award – Female	Lovelyz	Nominated	
Asia Artist Awards	2020	Female Idol Group Popularity Award	Lovelyz	Nominated	
Asia Model Awards	2019	Popular Star Award (Singer)	Lovelyz	Won	
Asian Pop Music Awards	2020	Best Group (Overseas)	Lovelyz	Nominated	
Asian Pop Music Awards	2020	Best Dance Performance - (Overseas)	"Obliviate"	Nominated	
Asian Pop Music Awards	2020	Song of the Year - (Overseas)	"Obliviate"	Nominated	
Asian Pop Music Awards	2020	Top 20 Albums – (Overseas)	Unforgettable	Won	
Asian Pop Music Awards	2020	Best Album – (Overseas)	Unforgettable	Nominated	
Asian Pop Music Awards	2020	Best Artist – (Overseas)	Lovelyz	Nominated	
Gaon Chart Music Awards	2015	New Artist of the Year – Album	Lovelyz	Nominated	
Gaon Chart Music Awards	2021	MuBeat Global Choice Award – Female Group	Lovelyz	Nominated	
Golden Disc Awards	2016	Rookie of the Year Award	Lovelyz	Nominated	
Golden Disc Awards	2016	Popularity Award	Lovelyz	Nominated	
Golden Disc Awards	2016	Global Popularity Award	Lovelyz	Nominated	
Golden Disc Awards	2017	Album Bonsang	A New Trilogy	Nominated	
Golden Disc Awards	2017	Next Generation Award	Lovelyz	Won	
Golden Disc Awards	2018	Album Bonsang	R U Ready?	Nominated	
Golden Disc Awards	2018	Genie Popularity Award	Lovelyz	Nominated	
Golden Disc Awards	2018	Global Popularity Award	Lovelyz	Nominated	
Golden Disc Awards	2020	Album Bonsang	Once Upon a Time	Nominated	
Golden Disc Awards	2020	Best Female Group	Lovelyz	Won	
Korean Culture Entertainment Awards	2015	K-pop Best Artist	Lovelyz	Won	
Melon Music Awards	2015	Best New Female Artist	Lovelyz	Nominated	
Melon Music Awards	2018	Artist of the Year	Lovelyz	Nominated	
Melon Music Awards	2018	Album of the Year (Daesang)	Heal	Nominated	
Melon Music Awards	2018	Top 10 Artists	Lovelyz	Nominated	
Melon Music Awards	2019	Top 10 Artists	Lovelyz	Nominated	
Melon Music Awards	2019	Best Music Video	Lovelyz	Nominated	
Mnet Asian Music Awards	2015	Best New Female Artist	Lovelyz	Nominated	
Mnet Asian Music Awards	2015	Artist of the Year	Lovelyz	Nominated	
Mnet Asian Music Awards	2017	Album of the Year	R U Ready?	Nominated	
Mnet Asian Music Awards	2017	Best Dance Performance – Female Group	"Wow!"	Nominated	
Mnet Asian Music Awards	2017	Song of the Year	"Wow!"	Nominated	
Mnet Asian Music Awards	2018	Best Dance Performance – Female Group	"That day"	Nominated	
Mnet Asian Music Awards	2018	Song of the Year	"That day"	Nominated	
MTV Europe Music Awards	2018	Best Korean Act	Lovelyz	Nominated	
MTV Europe Music Awards	2018	Best Cheography	"That day"	Won	
MTV Europe Music Awards	2018	Best International Song	"That day"	Nominated	
Seoul Music Awards	2015	Bonsang Award	Lovelyz	Nominated	
Seoul Music Awards	2015	New Artist Award	Lovelyz	Nominated	
Seoul Music Awards	2015	Popularity Award	Lovelyz	Nominated	
Seoul Music Awards	2015	Hallyu Special Award	Lovelyz	Nominated	
Seoul Music Awards	2016	Bonsang Award	Lovelyz	Nominated	
Seoul Music Awards	2016	Popularity Award	Lovelyz	Nominated	
Seoul Music Awards	2016	Hallyu Special Award	Lovelyz	Nominated	
Seoul Music Awards	2017	Bonsang Award	Lovelyz	Nominated	
Seoul Music Awards	2017	Popularity Award	Lovelyz	Nominated	
Seoul Music Awards	2017	Hallyu Special Award	Lovelyz	Nominated	
Seoul Music Awards	2018	Bonsang Award	Lovelyz	Nominated	
Seoul Music Awards	2018	Popularity Award	Lovelyz	Nominated	
Seoul Music Awards	2018	Hallyu Special Award	Lovelyz	Nominated	
Seoul Music Awards	2020	Bonsang Award	Lovelyz	Nominated	
Seoul Music Awards	2020	Popularity Award	Lovelyz	Nominated	
Seoul Music Awards	2020	Hallyu Special Award	Lovelyz	Nominated	
Seoul Music Awards	2020	QQ Music Most Popular K-Pop Artist Award	Lovelyz	Nominated	
Soompi Awards	2015	Rookie of the Year	Lovelyz	Nominated	
Soompi Awards	2016	Best Female Group	Lovelyz	Nominated	
Soompi Awards	2018	Best Female Group	Lovelyz	Nominated	
Soribada Best K-Music Awards	2018	Bonsang Award	Lovelyz	Nominated	
Soribada Best K-Music Awards	2018	Female Popularity Award	Lovelyz	Nominated	
Soribada Best K-Music Awards	2018	Global Fandom Award	Lovelyz	Nominated	
Soribada Best K-Music Awards	2019	New K-Wave Artist Award	Lovelyz	Won	
Soribada Best K-Music Awards	2019	Bonsang Award	Lovelyz	Nominated	
Soribada Best K-Music Awards	2019	Female Popularity Award	Lovelyz	Nominated	
Soribada Best K-Music Awards	2020	Female Popularity Award	Lovelyz	Nominated	
