= Lee Su-jeong =

South Korean singer (born 1992)

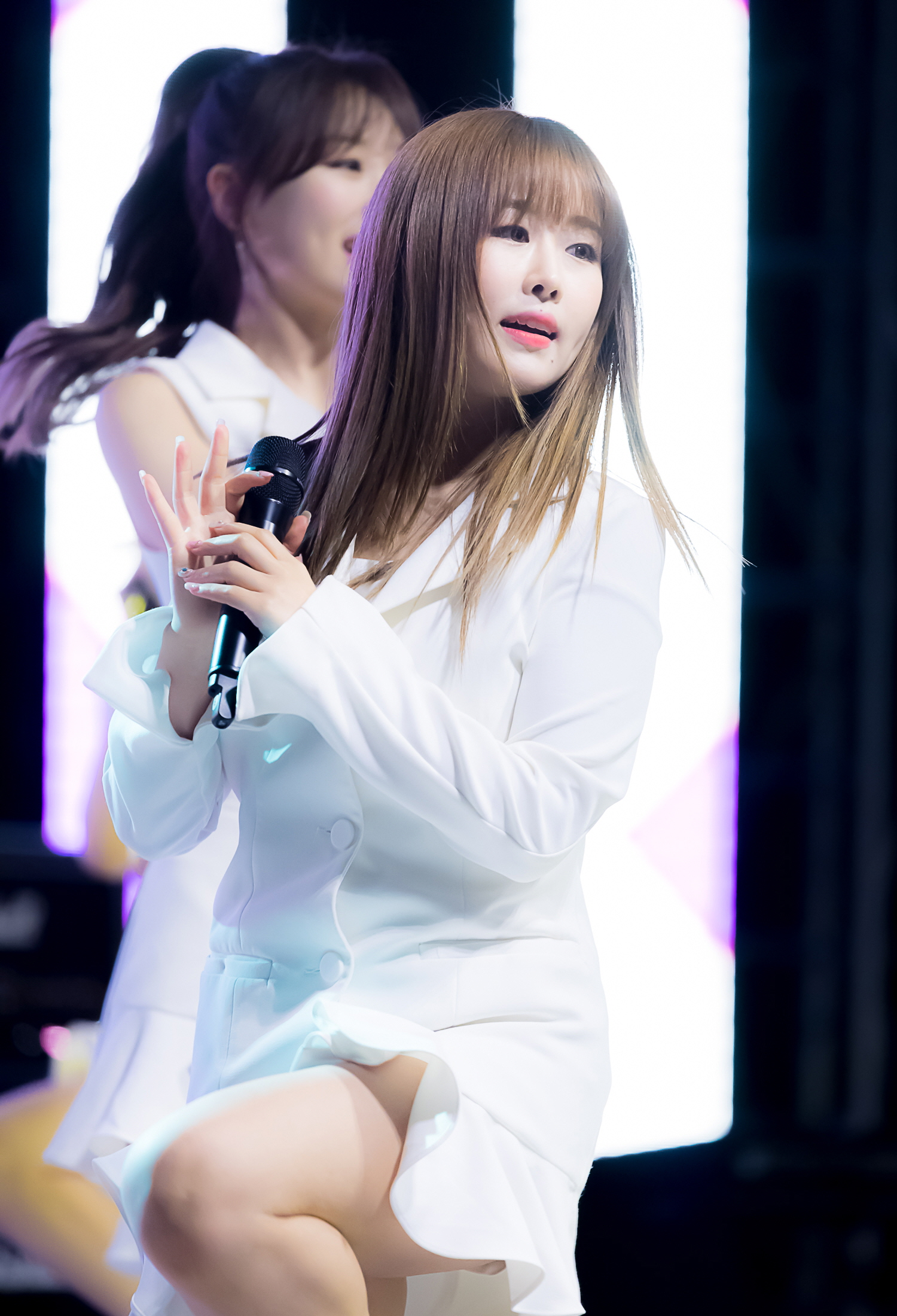
- Lee in May 2018
- Born: Lee Su-jeong; July 6, 1992 (age 34); Gwangju, South Korea
- Other name: Baby Soul
- Occupation: Singer
- Years active: 2011–present
- Musical career
- Genres: K-pop
- Instrument: Vocals
- Label: Woollim
- Member of: Lovelyz

Korean name
- Hangul: 이수정
- Hanja: 李洙姃
- RR: I Sujeong
- MR: I Sujŏng
- Website: https://www.woolliment.com/arsits/lee-sujeong

Lee Su-jeong (Korean: 이수정, born July 6, 1992), formerly known as Baby Soul, is a South Korean singer and member of South Korean girl group Lovelyz under Woollim Entertainment. She firstly released digital single with "Stranger" on November 23, 2011 prior to debut as a member of girl group Lovelyz in November 2014.

Following Lovelyz's contract expiration and resulting hiatus in November 2021, Lee renewed her contract with Woollim and began a solo career with her birth name Lee Su-jeong. Lee later released her debut EP My Name.

== Career ==
=== 2011–2013: Pre-debut project ===
Lee made her first appearance as a featured singer in labelmate Infinite's debut studio album Over the Top on the song "Crying". She later made her debut as a soloist on November 26, 2011 under the stage name Babysoul with her first single "Stranger" featuring soloist Wheesung as a part of Woollim Entertainment first girlgroup pre-debut project. On January 18, 2012, Lee released her second single "She's a Flirt", a duet with fellow Woollim Entertainment trainee, Yoo Ji-a.

=== 2014–2021: Debut with Lovelyz ===
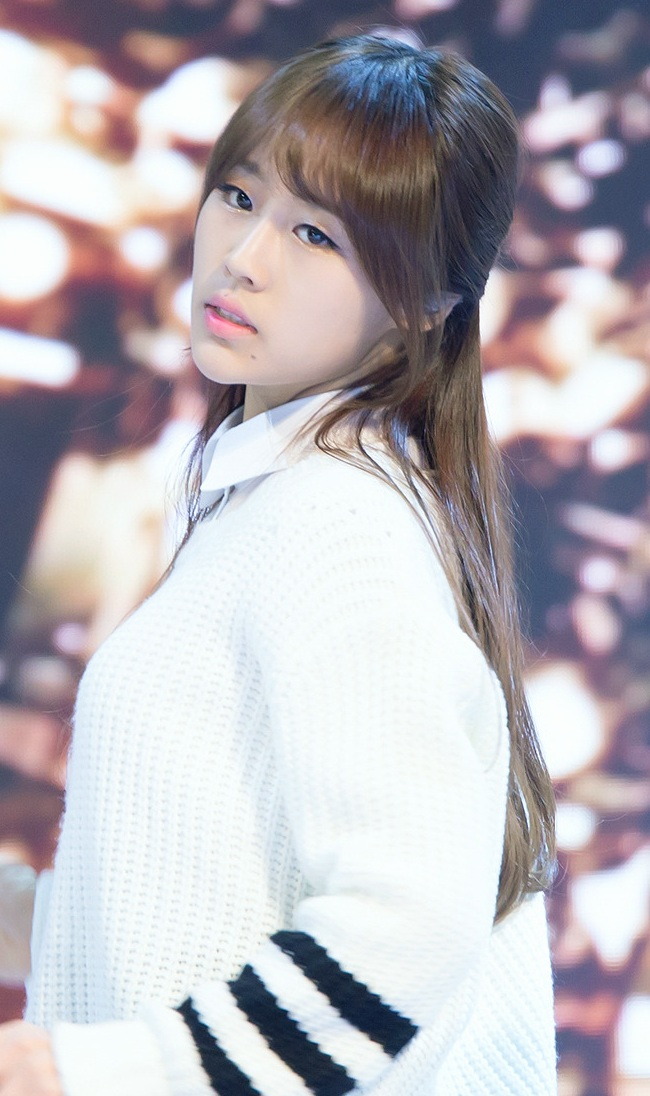
Lee Su-jeong on 2014

On November 12, 2014 Lee debuted as the leader of Woollim Entertainment first girlgroup Lovelyz. The group's debut studio album Girls' Invasion was officially released on November 17, along with its lead single titled "Candy Jelly Love".

On April 23, 2019, Lee released her solo single "A Piece of Moon" after previously performing it on Lovelyz's Lovelyz in Winterland 3 Concert back in February 2019.

On November 1, 2021, Woollim Entertainment announced all of Lovelyz members, except Baby Soul, had decided not to renew their contracts, which expired on November 16. However, Woollim Entertainment didn't mention in its press release sent to news agencies on whether the group would be disbanded. Later, Lee confirmed that although the members are signed under different agencies, they still have desire to promote and release albums together as Lovelyz in the near future. On November 17, Woolim Entertainment officially stated that Baby Soul has decided to begin using her given name Lee Su-jeong for her future promotions.

=== 2022–present: Solo debut and solo activities ===
On April 19, 2022, it was announced that Lee would release her debut EP titled My Name on April 23 with the title track "Walking Through The Moon". Along with the release of her debut EP My Name, Lee held her first solo concert throughout the month of May for four weeks from May 5 to 19.

On December 19, 2022, Lee released "The Miracle of Christmas" a collaboration with singer LEEWOO.

== Discography ==
=== Extended plays ===
Title	Details	Peak chart positions	Sales
Title	Details	KOR	Sales
My Name	Released: April 26, 2022; Label: Woollim Entertainment; Formats: CD, digital download, streaming	49	KOR: 1,735

=== Singles ===
Title	Year	Peak chart positions		Album
Title	Year	KOR	KOR Hot	Album
As lead artist
"Stranger" (남보다 못한 사이)	2011	—	—	Girls' Invasion
"A Piece Of Moon" (조각달)	2019	—	—	Non-album single
"Walking Through The Moon" (달을 걸어서)	2022	—	—	My Name
"삐에로는 우리보고 웃지"	2024	—	—	Non-album single
As featured artist
"Crying" (Infinite H feat. Baby Soul)	2011	—	—	Over the Top
"Fly High" (Infinite H feat. Baby Soul)	2013	—	—	Fly High
Collaborations
"She's A Flirt" (그녀는 바람둥이야) (with Yoo Ji-A (feat. Jang Dong-woo of Infinite))	2012	—	—	Non-album single
"Under The Sky of Suncheon" (순천의 하늘 아래에서) (with Ryu Su-jeong (Lovelyz), TAG and Joo-chan (Golden Child))	2021	—	—	Non-album single
"The Miracle Of Christmas" (크라스마스 기적) (with LEEWOO)	2022	—	—	Non-album single
Soundtrack appearances
"Clean" (오늘도 맑음) (with Ryu Su-jeong (Lovelyz))	2016	—	—	Second to Last Love OST
"Loving You" (with Mijoo and JIN (Lovelyz))	2020	—	—	Do Do Sol Sol La La Sol OST
"—" denotes releases that did not chart or were not released in that region.

=== Songwriting credits ===
All song credits are adapted from the Korea Music Copyright Association's database unless stated otherwise.

Year	Artist	Song	Album	Lyrics		Music	
Year	Artist	Song	Album	Credited	With	Credited	With
2012	Baby Soul, Yoo Ji-a	"She's A Flirt (Girl ver)" (그녀는바람둥이야 (Girl ver))	Non-album single	Yes	An Young-min	No	–
2016	Lovelyz	"Bookmark" (책갈피)	A New Trilogy	Yes	ReRikRu	No	–
2017	Lovelyz	"Emotion"	R U Ready?	Yes	Lee Hyung-seok, Han Jae-ho, Kim Seung-su, Song Su-yun	No	–
2018	Lovelyz	"Temptation"	Heal	Yes	Davink	No	–
2018	Lovelyz	"Daydream" (백일몽)	Sanctuary	Yes	Jung Ho-hyun	No	–
2019	Baby Soul	"A Piece Of Moon" (조각달)	Non-album single	Yes	-	Yes	Sweetch, Song Sung-kyung
2020	With Woollim	"Relay" (이어달리기)	Non-album single	Yes	Seo Young-bae, Won Jung-ho, TAG, Lee Jang-jun, Seo Jae-woo	No	-
2020	Lovelyz (Baby Soul, Ryu Su-jeong), Golden Child (Tag, Hong Joo-chan)	"Under The Sky of Suncheon" (순천의 하늘 아래에서)	Non-album single	Yes	Ryu Su-jeog, Tag, Hong Joo-chan	Yes	Tag
2022	Herself	"Say Goodbye" (진작에헤어질걸그랬어)	My Name	Yes	MARCO	No	-
2022	Herself	"Cosmos"	My Name	Yes	-	No	-
2022	Herself	"Warmth Of Love" (체온)	My Name	Yes	Croq	No	-
2022	Herself	"Mirror" (거울)	My Name	Yes	Im Hyun-sik, Vincenzo	No	-
2022	Herself	"Walking Through The Moon" (달을걸어서)	My Name	Yes	-	No	-
