= Ji-ae =

- Hangul: 지애
- RR: Jiae
- MR: Chiae

Ji-ae is a Korean given name.

People with this name include:

- Lee Ji-ae (born 1981), South Korean television announcer
- Jeon Ji-ae (born 1984), South Korean actress
- Lee Ji-ae (born 1987), South Korean singer, former member of T-ara
- Jiyai Shin (born 1988), South Korean golfer
- Yoo Ji-ae (born 1993), South Korean singer and actress, member of Lovelyz
- Kim Ji-ae (born 1995), South Korean singer, member of Wassup

== See also ==
- List of Korean given names
