= Seo Ji-eum =

South Korean lyricist

- Born: Seo Ji-eum; December 15, 1986 (age 39)
- Occupations: Lyricist; singer
- Musical career
- Years active: 2012–present
- Label: Jieum Akdan

Korean name
- Hangul: 서지음
- RR: Seo Jieum
- MR: Sŏ Chiŭm

Seo Ji-eum (Korean: 서지음; born December 15, 1986), is a South Korean lyricist and singer. She started getting recognition after writing the lyrics for Girls' Generation-TTS's "Twinkle" and f(x)'s "Electric Shock". She won the Lyricist of the Year Award at the 2018 Gaon Chart Music Awards. She released her debut single "Greenroom" on March 27, 2021. She has since written songs for various artists.

== Songwriting credits ==
All songwriting credits are adapted from the Korea Music Copyright Association's database, unless otherwise noted.

=== 2010s ===
Year	Artist(s)	Album	Song	Other writer(s)
2012	Ha Dong-kyun	Take Care of Us, Captain OST	"Side of My Heart" (가슴 한쪽)	—N/a
2012	J-Walk	Take Care of Us, Captain OST	"Half" (반 (反))	Park Chung-kwang
2012	Kim Bo-kyung	Dummy Mommy OST	"Dramatic" (드라마틱)	—N/a
2012	Girls' Generation-TTS	Twinkle	"Twinkle"	—N/a
2012	f(x)	Electric Shock	"Electric Shock"	—N/a
2012	Yoo Seung-chan	Arang and the Magistrate OST	"Mirage" (신기루)	—N/a
2013	Super Junior-M	Break Down	"Break Down (Korean Ver.)"	Lee Seu-ran; Lee Hyo-min
2013	Exo	XOXO	"Black Pearl"	—N/a
2013	Exo	XOXO	"Don't Go" (나비소녀)	—N/a
2013	f(x)	Pink Tape	"Toy"	—N/a
2013	Exo	Growl	"Growl" (으르렁)	—N/a
2013	NU'EST	Sleep Talking	"Beautiful Ghost"	JR
2014	TVXQ	Tense	"Off-Road"	—N/a
2014	TVXQ	Tense	"Smoky Heart" (갈증)	—N/a
2014	Bubble Sisters	Memory	"Travel Diary" (여행일기)	—N/a
2014	Exo	Overdose	"Moonlight" (월광)	—N/a
2014	Exo	Overdose	"Run"	—N/a
2014	Exo	Overdose	"Love, Love, Love"	—N/a
2014	f(x)	Red Light	"Boom Bang Boom"	—N/a
2014	f(x)	Red Light	"Paper Heart" (종이 심장)	—N/a
2014	Lee Tae-min	Ace	"Danger" (괴도)	—N/a
2014	Laboum	Petit Macaron	"Pit-A-Pat" (두근두근)	—N/a
2014	Super Junior	Mamacita	"Let's Dance"	—N/a
2014	Super Junior	Mamacita	"Islands"	Jo Yoon-kyung; Lee Yoo-jin
2014	Laboum	Petit Macaron Data Pack	"Winter Party"	—N/a
2015	Lovelyz	Hi~	"Hi~" (안녕)	—N/a
2015	Lovelyz	Hi~	"Joyland" (놀이공원)	—N/a
2015	Super Junior-D&E	The Beat Goes On	"Sweater & Jeans"	—N/a
2015	Laboum	Sugar Sugar	"Sugar Sugar"	—N/a
2015	Exo	Exodus	"What If..." (시선 둘, 시선 하나)	—N/a
2015	Exo	Exodus	"El Dorado"	Lee Yoo-jin
2015	Melody Day	#LoveMe	"#LoveMe"	Kim Min-jeong
2015	Red Velvet	The Red	"Dumb Dumb"	Kim Dong-hyun
2015	Lovelyz	Lovelyz8	"Ah-Choo"	—N/a
2015	Oh My Girl	Closer	"Closer"	Mimi
2015	Oh My Girl	Closer	"Say No More"	—N/a
2015	Click-B	Reborn	"I Miss You" (보고싶어)	Ricky
2016	Coolyote	Non-album single	"No!Mantic"	—N/a
2016	WJSN	Would You Like?	"Catch Me"	—N/a
2016	WJSN	Would You Like?	"Tick-Tock"	—N/a
2016	Red Velvet	The Velvet	"One of These Nights"	—N/a
2016	Hyomin	Sketch	"Sketch"	—N/a
2016	Produce 101 trainees	35 Girls 5 Concepts	"Fingertips"	—N/a
2016	Produce 101 trainees	35 Girls 5 Concepts	"Yum-Yum" (얌얌)	—N/a
2016	Oh My Girl	Pink Ocean	"Liar Liar"	Mimi
2016	Oh My Girl	Pink Ocean	"B612"	Mimi
2016	Oh My Girl	Pink Ocean	"I Found Love"	Mimi
2016	Boys Republic	BR: Evolution	"Get Down"	Minsu; Sungjun
2016	I.O.I	Chrysalis	"Crush"	Seo Jeong-ah
2016	Lovelyz	A New Trilogy	"Dear You" (마음 (*취급주의))	—N/a
2016	Monsta X	The Clan Pt. 1 Lost	"Stuck" (네게만 집착해)	Punch Sound; Jooheon; I.M
2016	Monsta X	The Clan Pt. 1 Lost	"Unfair Love" (반칙이야)	Kiggen; Stereo 14; LISH; Jooheon; I.M
2016	Oh My Girl	Windy Day	"Windy Day"	Mimi
2016	Fiestar	Non-album single	"Apple Pie"	—N/a
2016	Luna	Free Somebody	"Free Somebody"	Kim Min-ji; JQ
2016	Exo	Ex'Act	"White Noise" (백색소음)	—N/a
2016	Tei	Monster OST	"Stay With Me" (같이만 있자)	—N/a
2016	Monsta X	The Clan Pt. 2 Guilty	"Fighter"	Jooheon; I.M
2016	Pentagon	Pentagon	"Gorilla"	—N/a
2016	Hello Venus	Mystery of Venus	"Runway"	—N/a
2016	Sistar	Non-album single	"One More Day" (featuring Giorgio Moroder)	—N/a
2016	Pentagon	Five Senses	"Pretty Pretty" (예쁨)	—N/a
2016	Exo	For Life	"Falling for You"	—N/a
2017	S.E.S	Remember	"My Rainbow" (친구-세번째 이야기)	—N/a
2017	WJSN	From. WJSN	"I Wish" (너에게닿기를)	Glory Face (Full8loom); Jinri (Full8loom); Long Candy; Exy
2017	I	I Dream	"My Melody"	—N/a
2017	Niel	Love Affair...	"Fever" (나 열나)	—N/a
2017	Lovelyz	R U Ready?	"Knock Knock" (똑똑)	—N/a
2017	Eric Nam, Jeon Somi	Non-album single	"You, Who?" (유후)	—N/a
2017	Girl's Day	Girl's Day Everyday 5	"Thirsty"	Yura
2017	Oh My Girl	Coloring Book	"Real World"	Mayu Wakisaka
2017	Oh My Girl	Coloring Book	"Agit"	—N/a
2017	Changmo, Hyolyn	Non-album single	"Blue Moon"	Changmo
2017	Yesung	Spring Falling	"Paper Umbrella" (봄날의 소나기)	—N/a
2017	Davink	Just Arrived	"36.5MHz"	—N/a
2017	Davink	Just Arrived	"Glass Bottle Letter" (유리병 편지)	—N/a
2017	Lovelyz	R U Ready?	"Now, We" (지금, 우리)	—N/a
2017	Astro	Dream Part.01	"Every Minute"	Jinjin; Rocky
2017	Produce 101 trainees	Produce 101 - Final	"Hands on Me"	Lee Seu-ran
2017	Hyolyn, Kisum	Non-album single	"Fruity"	Kisum
2017	Exo	The War	"Chill" (소름)	Chanyeol
2017	Paul Kim	Love Playlist 2 OST	"Hey" (있잖아)	—N/a
2017	Weki Meki	Weme	"I Don't Like Your Girlfriend"	—N/a
2017	Weki Meki	Weme	"Stay With Me"	Zaydro (Code 9); Hwang Jae-woong (Code 9); RHeaT (Code 9); Choi Yoo-jung
2017	NCT Dream	We Young	"Walk You Home" (같은 시간 같은 자리)	Mark
2017	Primary	Pop	"Right?" (featuring Soyou)	—N/a
2017	Primary	Pop	"Diet" (다이어트) (featuring Solji)	—N/a
2017	Jeong Se-woon, Sik-K	Ever	"Just U"	Long Candy beautiful noise Lovey; Sik-K
2017	Jung Eun-ji	Non-album single	"Manito" (마니또)	—N/a
2017	K.Will	Nonfiction	"Let Me Hear You Say" (미필적 고의) (featuring Soyou)	—N/a
2017	Taemin	Move	"Move"	—N/a
2017	Taemin	Move	"Back to You"	—N/a
2017	Super Junior	Play	"The Lucky Ones"	Jinri (Full8loom)
2017	Super Junior	Play	"Too Late" (시간 차)	—N/a
2017	Monsta X	The Code	"Dramarama"	Seo Jung-ah; Jooheon; I.M
2017	Super Junior-K.R.Y.	Play	"Shadowless" (애태우다)	—N/a
2017	Soyou	Re:Born	"The Night" (기우는 밤) (featuring Geeks)	Lil Boi, Louie
2017	Younha	Rescue	"Parade"	—N/a
2018	Hwanhee	Non-album single	"The Dawn" (새벽감성)	—N/a
2018	Oh My Girl	Secret Garden	"Secret Garden" (비밀정원)	—N/a
2018	Oh My Girl	Secret Garden	"Love O'clock"	Mimi
2018	Oh My Girl	Secret Garden	"Sixteen"	—N/a
2018	Jonghyun	Poet | Artist	"Take The Dive"	—N/a
2018	Kwon Jin-ah	Flower Ever After OST	"Behind The Page" (이별 뒷면)	—N/a
2018	Hyolyn	Non-album single	"To Do List" (내일할래)	—N/a
2018	Weki Meki	Lucky	"Lucky"	—N/a
2018	Weki Meki	Lucky	"La La La"	—N/a
2018	WJSN	Dream Your Dream	"Renaissance" (르네상스)	Exy
2018	Up10tion	Invitation	"Target On" (반해, 안 반해)	—N/a
2018	Monsta X	The Connect: Dejavu	"Jealousy"	Jooheon; I.M
2018	Monsta X	The Connect: Dejavu	"Fallin'" (폭우)	Jooheon; I.M
2018	Hyolyn	Say My Name	"Dally" (달리) (featuring Gray)	Hyolyn; Gray
2018	GFriend	Time for the Moon Night	"Love Bug"	—N/a
2018	GroovyRoom	Non-album single	"My Paradise" (featuring Chungha, Vinxen)	Vinxen
2018	Shinee	The Story of Light	"Who Waits for Love" (독감)	Deepflow
2018	AOA	Bingle Bangle	"Parfait" (파르페)	Jimin
2018	Shinee	The Story of Light	"Undercover"	—N/a
2018	Lovelyz	Non-album single	"Wag-Zak" (여름 한 조각)	—N/a
2018	Red Velvet	Summer Magic	"Mosquito"	—N/a
2018	Red Velvet	Summer Magic	"Blue Lemonade"	—N/a
2018	NCT Dream	We Go Up	"Beautiful Time" (너와 나)	Kim In-ha; Mark
2018	Oh My Girl	Remember Me	"Remember Me" (불꽃놀이)	Mimi
2018	Oh My Girl	Remember Me	"Echo" (메아리)	Mimi
2018	Oh My Girl	Remember Me	"Twilight"	Mimi
2018	Oh My Girl	Remember Me	"Illusion" (일루션)	—N/a
2018	WJSN	WJ Please?	"I-yah" (아이야)	Exy
2018	Yuri	The First Scene	"Butterfly"	—N/a
2018	Monsta X	Take.1 Are You There?	"Shoot Out"	Jooheon; I.M
2018	BoA	Woman	"Like It"	—N/a
2018	Exo	Don't Mess Up My Tempo	"Bad Dream" (후폭풍)	—N/a
2018	NCT 127	Regulate	"Welcome to My Playground"	Ra.D; Brother Su; Taeyong; Mark
2018	Exo	Love Shot	"Wait"	—N/a
2019	GroovyRoom	Non-album single	"This Night" (행성) (featuring Blue.D, Jhnovr)	GroovyRoom; Blue.D; Jhnovr; Gemini
2019	Baekhyun	Exo Planet 4 - The Elyxion (dot) and City Lights	"Psycho"	—N/a
2019	George	It's Okay to Be Sensitive 2 OST	"No Filter" (아무 말) (featuring Coogie)	Coogie
2019	Monsta X	Take.2 We Are Here	"Alligator"	Jooheon; I.M
2019	Monsta X, Steve Aoki	Take.2 We Are Here	"Play It Cool (Korean Ver.)"	I.M
2019	Monsta X	Take.2 We Are Here	"Stealer"	Lee Seu-ran; Jooheon; I.M
2019	Everglow	Arrival of Everglow	"Moon" (달아)	E:U (Everglow)
2019	Chen	April, and a Flower	"Portrait of You" (널 그리다)	—N/a
2019	Minhyun	Happily Ever After	"Universe" (별의 언어)	Minhyun; Bumzu
2019	Oh My Girl	The Fifth Season	"The Fifth Season (SSFWL)" (다섯 번째 계절 (SSFWL))	—N/a
2019	Oh My Girl	The Fifth Season	"Shower" (소나기)	—N/a
2019	Oh My Girl	The Fifth Season	"Gravity" (유성)	—N/a
2019	Oh My Girl	The Fifth Season	"Underwater Love" (심해 (마음이라는 바다))	—N/a
2019	Oh My Girl	The Fifth Season	"Vogue"	Mimi
2019	Oh My Girl	The Fifth Season	"Checkmate"	Shin Jin-hye; Seo Jeong-ah; Mimi
2019	Red Velvet	The ReVe Festival: Day 1	"Parade" (안녕, 여름)	—N/a
2019	Red Velvet	The ReVe Festival: Day 1	"LP"	—N/a
2019	GWSN	The Park in the Night Part Three	"All Mine (Coast of Azure)"	Seo Jeong-ah
2019	Oh My Girl	Fall in Love	"Bungee (Fall in Love)"	Mimi
2019	Oh My Girl	Fall in Love	"Tropical Love"	—N/a
2019	Everglow	Hush	"Adios"	72
2019	CLC	Non-album single	"Devil"	Yeeun
2019	Super Junior	Time Slip	"Somebody New"	—N/a
2019	Oh My Girl	Queendom Finale Comeback Singles	"Guerilla" (게릴라)	Mimi
2019	Monsta X	Follow: Find You	"Follow"	Brother Su; Jooheon; I.M

=== 2020s ===
Year	Artist(s)	Album	Song	Other writer(s)
2020	Younha	Unstable Mindset	"26"	—N/a
2020	Everglow	Reminiscence	"Dun Dun"	—N/a
2020	Iz*One	Bloom*Iz	"Fiesta"	Go Hyun-jung (JamFactory); Choi Hyun-joon; Kim Seung-soo
2020	NCT 127	Neo Zone	"Dream" (꿈)	—N/a
2020	NCT 127	Neo Zone	"Love Song" (우산)	Taeyong; Mark; Johnny
2020	Max Changmin	Chocolate	"Lie" (featuring Chungha)	—N/a
2020	Cravity	Season 1. Hideout: Remember Who We Are	"Break all the Rules"	—N/a
2020	April	Da Capo	"1,2,3,4"	—N/a
2020	Oh My Girl	Nonstop	"Nonstop" (살짝 설렜어)	Mimi
2020	Oh My Girl	Nonstop	"Flower Tea" (꽃차)	—N/a
2020	Oh My Girl	Nonstop	"NE♡N" (Neon)	—N/a
2020	NU'EST	The Nocturne	"Back to You" (평행우주)	Baekho; Bumzu
2020	NCT 127	Neo Zone: The Final Round	"Make Your Day" (너의 하루)	—N/a
2020	Ryu Su-jeong	Tiger Eyes	"Tiger Eyes"	—N/a
2020	Kim Woo-seok	1st Desire (Greed)	"Red Moon" (적월 (赤月))	Jang Yeo-jin; Kevin Leinster Jr. (Vendors); Kim Woo-seok
2020	Ha Sung-woon	Twilight Zone	"Get Ready"	—N/a
2020	Weeekly	We Are	"Hello"	—N/a
2020	Jeong Se-woon	24 Part 1	"O" (동그라미)	Jeong Se-woon
2020	Oh My Girl	Non-album single	"Rocket Ride (Korean Ver.)"	—N/a
2020	Lovelyz	Unforgettable	"Never, Secret" (절대, 비밀)	—N/a
2020	YooA	Bon Voyage	"Bon Voyage" (숲의 아이)	—N/a
2020	YooA	Bon Voyage	"Far" (날 찾아서)	—N/a
2020	YooA	Bon Voyage	"End Of Story"	—N/a
2020	Fromis 9	My Little Society	"Feel Good (Secret Code)"	Cho Sim
2020	Kyuhyun	Love Story	"Daystar" (내 마음을 누르는 일)	1601
2020	Monsta X	Fatal Love	"Love Killa"	Jeff Lewis; Andy Love; Jooheon; I.M
2020	Ha Sung-woon	Mirage	"Forbidden Island" (그 섬)	—N/a
2020	Hyolyn	Swag OST	"Spell"	—N/a
2020	Kim Ah-reum	Winter City	"Winter Miracle" (겨울의 기적)	—N/a
2021	Kim Woo-seok	2nd Desire (Tasty)	"Sugar"	Kim Woo-seok; Kevin Leinster Jr. (Vendors) danke (lalala studio); Hwang Yoo-bin
2021	Weeekly	We Play	"After School"	Seo Jeong-ah
2021	Seo Ji-eum	Greenroom of Space	"Pluto" (명왕성)	—N/a
2021	Seo Ji-eum	Greenroom of Space	"Greenroom" (온실)	—N/a
2021	Shinee	Atlantis	"Days and Years"	Colde
2021	Highlight	The Blowing	"Wave"	—N/a
2021	Oh My Girl	Dear OhMyGirl	"Dun Dun Dance"	Ryan S. Jhun; Scott Stoddart; Anna Timgren
2021	Seo Ji-eum	Spring, Leaves, Island	"Spring Leaves" (이 봄엔 낙엽이 한창이다)	—N/a
2021	Seo Ji-eum	Spring, Leaves, Island	"I's Land" (우리는 모두 섬이 되어)	—N/a
2021	Kim Ah-reum	Summer City	"Diving" (잠수모드)	—N/a
2021	Exo	Don't Fight the Feeling	"Runaway"	—N/a
2021	NCT U	Maxis by Ryan Jhun Pt. 1	"Maniac"	Ryan S. Jhun; Paddy Dalton; Jacob Attwooll; Shawn Desman
2021	Red Velvet	Queendom	"Knock on Wood"	—N/a
2021	Adora	Adorable Rebirth	"Make U Dance" (featuring Eunha)	Adora; Seo Jeong-ah
2021	Ive	Eleven	"Eleven"	Ryan S. Jhun
2021	Seo Ji-eum	Non-album single	"Time 2 Go 2 Bed"	—N/a
2022	Red Velvet	The ReVe Festival 2022 – Feel My Rhythm	"Feel My Rhythm"	—N/a
2022	Red Velvet	The ReVe Festival 2022 – Feel My Rhythm	"Rainbow Halo"	—N/a
2022	Oh My Girl	Real Love	"Real Love"	—N/a
2022	Oh My Girl	Real Love	"Replay"	—N/a
2022	Oh My Girl	Real Love	"Kiss & Fix"	—N/a
2022	Oh My Girl	Real Love	"Blink"	—N/a
2022	Oh My Girl	Real Love	"Dear Rose"	—N/a
2022	Ive	Love Dive	"Love Dive"	—N/a
2022	Onew	Dice	"In the Whale"	Onew
2022	Hyolyn	Queendom 2 Final New Song Showdown	"Waka Boom (My Way)" (featuring Lee Young-ji)	Hyolyn; Lee Young-ji
2022	Kim Ah-reum	Ocean Wave	"Your Summer" (너의여름)	—N/a
2022	Fromis 9	From Our Memento Box	"Stay This Way"	—N/a
2022	Hyolyn	Ice	"Over You"	Hyolyn
2022	Hyolyn	Ice	"No Thanks"	Hyolyn
2022	Kim Ah-reum	Ocean Wave	"Highteen" (featuring Lee Won-seok of Daybreak)	—N/a
2022	Ive	After Like	"After Like"	Mommy Son; Rei
2022	LimeLight	Limelight	"Starlight"	Choi Hyun-joon; Kim Seung-soo
2022	Seulgi	28 Reasons	"Anywhere but Home"	—N/a
2022	Chaeyeon	Hush Rush	"Same But Different"	—N/a
2022	YooA	Selfish	"Selfish"	—N/a
2022	YooA	Selfish	"Lay Low"	—N/a
2022	YooA	Selfish	"Melody"	—N/a
2023	Ive	I've Ive	"Blue Blood"	—N/a
2023	Kim Eun-young	Caught Between Marriage & Divorce Season 2 OST	"Folding My Heart" (마음접기)	—N/a
2023	Teen Top	4Sho	"Hweek" (휙)	—N/a
2023	Nmixx	A Midsummer Nmixx's Dream	"Roller Coaster"	—N/a
2023	Zerobaseone	Youth in the Shade	"Back to Zerobase"	Jo Yoon-kyung; Danke; Seulli (MUMW); Lee Yi-jin
2023	Zerobaseone	Youth in the Shade	"In Bloom"	Seo Young-joon; Danke; Jo Yoon-kyung; Lee Yi-jin; Rum (MUMW); Jeon Hye-hyung (MUMW)
2023	Kep1er	Magic Hour	Galileo	N/A
2023	Ive	I've Mine	"Off the Record"	—N/a
2023	Ive	I've Mine	"Holy Moly"	—N/a
	Chuu	Howl	"Howl"	—N/a
	Chuu	Howl	"Aliens"	—N/a
	&Team	First Howling: Now	"War Cry"	David Wilson, Jutes, Ollipop, Ryan Lawrie, Elijah Noll, Slow Rabbit
	Jeon Soyeon, Winter, Liz	Nobody	"Nobody"	—N/a
2024	Itzy	Born to Be	"Mr. Vampire"	—N/a
2024	Yooa	Borderline	"Rooftop"	—N/a
2024	Ive	Ive Switch	"Accendio"	Gaeko; Seo Jeong-ah
2024	Ive	Ive Switch	"Ice Queen"	—N/a
2024	Oh My Girl	Dreamy Resonance	"Heavenly"	—N/a
2024	Kim Areum	Turbulence	"Turbulence" (난기류)	—N/a
2024	The Wind	Hello: My First Love	"Hello, My First Love"	—N/a
2024	Odd Youth	Best Friendz	"Best Friendz"	Lewis Christopher Andrea Fitzroy
2024	Cho Yong Pil	20	"Why"	—N/a
2025	Ive	Ive Empathy	"Attitude"	Nietzsche; Jang Won-young
2025	Ive	Ive Secret	"XOXZ"	Hwang Yu-bin; Jang Won-young
2026	Ive	Revive+	"Bang Bang"	Hwang Yu-bin; Jang Won-young; Exy
2026	Ive	Revive+	"Blackhole"	Hwang Yu-bin

== Discography ==
=== Single albums ===
Title	Details
Greenroom of Space (우주의 온실)	Released: March 27, 2021; Label: Jieum Akdan; Formats: Digital download, streaming
Spring, Leaves, Island (봄, 낙엽, 섬)	Released: May 13, 2021; Label: Jieum Akdan; Formats: Digital download, streaming

=== Singles ===
Title	Year	Album
"Greenroom (온실)"	2021	Greenroom of Space
"Spring Leaves" (우주의 온실)	2021	Spring, Leaves, Island
"Time 2 Go 2 Bed"	2021	Non-album single

== Awards and nominations ==
Name of the award ceremony, year presented, category, nominee of the award, and the result of the nomination
Award ceremony	Year	Category	Nominee / Work	Result	Ref.
Circle Chart Music Awards	2018	Lyricist of the Year	Herself	Won	
Circle Chart Music Awards	2022	Lyricist of the Year	Herself	Won	
