= Wag-Zak =

Song by Lovelyz

Single by Lovelyz
- Language: Korean
- Released: July 1, 2018
- Recorded: 2018
- Genre: K-pop; tropical house
- Length: 3:31
- Label: Woollim; Kakao M
- Composer(s): Razer (Strike); Hongdi
- Lyricist(s): Seo Ji-eum
- Producer(s): Lee Jung-yeop (exec.)

Lovelyz singles chronology
"That Day" (2018)	"Wag-Zak" (2018)	"Lost N Found" (2018)

Music video
- "Wag-Zak" on YouTube

"Wag-Zak" (Korean: 여름 한 조각; lit. A Piece of Summer) is a song by South Korean girl group Lovelyz, released as the group's first non-album digital single. The single was released on July 1, 2018 by Woollim Entertainment and distributed by Kakao M (formerly LOEN Entertainment). Only seven members participated in this single as Jin was absent due to health issues.

== Composition ==
"Wag-Zak" was written by Seo Ji-eum and composed by Razer (Strike), Hongdi, and Jaeripoteo. It was described by Billboard as vibrant tropical house beat song with a breezy melody that bounces along rhythmically towards its refreshing chorus and the sudden pronouncement of the titular phrase.

== Background and release ==
On June 21, Woollim Entertainment announced that Lovelyz would release their special digital single titled "Wag-Zak". It was also announced that Jin would not partake in the promotions due to health issues. Lovelyz performed "Wag-Zak" for the first time at Mnet's M Countdown on June 28, following in the various music program for a week. Their digital single "Wag-Zak" was released on July 1, complemented by a music video, marking their first summer release.

== Music video ==
The music video for "Wag-Zak" was released on July 1. The video shows the members of Lovelyz hanging out together on a resort, enjoying games, cocktails, water gun fights, and more. Jin did not appear in the music video due to health issues.

== Track listing ==
No.	Title	Lyrics	Music	Arrangement	Length
1.	"Wag-Zak" (여름 한 조각)	Seo Ji-eum	Razer (Strike); Hongdi; Jarry Potter	Razer (Strike); Hongdi	3:31
Total length:					3:31

== Charts ==
Chart (2018)	Peak position
South Korea (Gaon)	95
South Korea (Billboard Hot 100)	92

== Release history ==
Region	Date	Format	Label
South Korea	July 1, 2018	Digital download	Woollim Entertainment; Kakao M
Various	July 1, 2018	Digital download	Woollim Entertainment; Kakao M
