= Lovelyz8 =

- Digital cover

EP by Lovelyz
- Released: October 1, 2015
- Recorded: 2015
- Genre: K-pop; dance; synthpop
- Length: 22:00
- Label: Woollim Label; SM C&C; LOEN Entertainment

Lovelyz chronology
Girls' Invasion (2014)	Lovelyz8 (2015)	Lovelinus (2015)

Singles from Lovelyz8
- 1. "Shooting Star" Released: September 14, 2015; 2. "Ah-Choo" Released: October 1, 2015

Music video
- "Shooting Star" on YouTube
- "Ah-Choo" on YouTube

Lovelyz8 is the first extended play by South Korean girl group Lovelyz. It was released on October 1, 2015. The EP contains seven tracks with the title track "Ah-Choo" and pre-release single "Shooting Star". This album marks the return of member Jisoo, who took a hiatus after becoming the target of online harassment.

This album is the last part of the 'Girls' trilogy. The sequel to their previous album Girls' Invasion and its repackage Hi~.

== Background and release ==
On August 25, 2015, Woollim Entertainment announced Lovelyz would return with eight members, Jisoo rejoining the group, through a teaser image that included the "Lovelyz8" album logo. The album was preceded with the release of its first single, "Shooting Star" on September 14 and the release of its music video on the same day. A preview of the album was released on September 28. A music video for the title track "Ah-Choo" was released on October 1 together with the digital album. Physical sales of the album began on October 2. The group appeared on a live-streaming broadcast through the Naver V Live app called "Lovelyz Surprise Party." Promotions also began that day for "Ah-Choo" on Mnet's M! Countdown, followed by performances on 'KBS' Music Bank on October 2 and 'SBS' Inkigayo on October 4. That first week of promotion also included additional stages for either a shortened version of "How to be a Pretty Girl" or "Shooting Star."

== Track listing ==
No.	Title	Lyrics	Music	Arrangement	Length
1.	"Welcome to the Lovelyz8"	Coach & Sendo	Coach & Sendo	Coach & Sendo	1:31
2.	"Ah-Choo"	Seo Ji-eum	One Piece	One Piece	3:38
3.	"Shooting Star" (작별하나; lit: One Farewell)	Sweetch, Oreo	Sweetch, Oreo	Sweetch, Oreo	3:14
4.	"Hug Me"	J.Yoon	J.Yoon	J.Yoon	3:44
5.	"How to Be a Pretty Girl" (예쁜 여자가 되는 법)	Lee Ji-rin	Lee Ji-rin	Lee Ji-rin	3:15
6.	"Sweet and Sour" (새콤달콤)	Super Market	Super Market	Super Market	3:32
7.	"Rapunzel" (라푼젤)	Lee Yoon-chae, Lee Jeong-pyo	Lee Yoon-chae, Lee Jeong-pyo	Lee Yoon-chae, Lee Jeong-pyo	3:26
Total length:					22:27

== Charts ==
=== Album ===
Chart	Peak position	Sales
South Korean Albums (Gaon)	2	23,213

== Release history ==
Region	Date	Format	Label
Worldwide	October 1, 2015	Digital download	SM C&C, Woollim Label
South Korea	October 1, 2015	Digital download	Woollim Label, LOEN Entertainment
South Korea	October 2, 2015	CD	Woollim Label, LOEN Entertainment
