= Yoo Ji-ae =

South Korean singer and actress (born 1993)

- Yoo in October 2015
- Born: May 21, 1993 (age 33); South Korea
- Occupations: Singer; actress
- Musical career
- Genre: K-pop
- Instrument: Vocals
- Years active: 2013–present
- Labels: Woollim; KPlus
- Member of: Lovelyz

Korean name
- Hangul: 유지애
- RR: Yu Jiae
- MR: Yu Chiae

Yoo Ji-ae (Korean: 유지애; born May 21, 1993), also known mononymously as Jiae (지애), is a South Korean singer and actress. She is best known as a member of the South Korean girl group Lovelyz, formed by Woollim Entertainment, with whom she debuted in November 2014. Previously, Yoo had already made her debut as a solo artist more than a year earlier, releasing the digital single "Delight" on April 24, 2013. In November 2021, following the expiry of Lovelyz's contract with Woollim Entertainment, she signed with KPlus to continue her career as a singer and actress.

== Career ==
=== 2010–2013: Pre-debut activities and solo debut ===
Before joining Lovelyz, in 2010, Yoo was a model for the fashion magazine Yozo and made an appearance as a cast member on You Are My Oppa, the debut variety show of the boy band Infinite. She also made her debut as a solo artist with the digital single "Delight" on April 24, 2013.

=== 2014–2021: Debut with Lovelyz ===
Yoo was revealed as an upcoming member of Lovelyz on November 3, 2014. Yoo debuted as a member of Lovelyz on November 17, 2014, with the group's first studio album, Girls' Invasion. Lovelyz went on indefinite hiatus in November 2021 after most of the members, including Yoo, opted not to renew their contracts with Woollim Entertainment upon their expiry; only member Baby Soul re-signed with the label.

=== 2021–present: Acting career with KPlus ===
On November 18, 2021, Yoo announced on Instagram that she had signed an exclusive contract with KPlus.

In May 2022, Yoo was cast in the web drama Office Cooking, playing an accounting employee named Han Da-eun; the eight-part series, also starring Hwangbo and Han Seung-yeon, premiered in July 2022 across TVING, Wavve, Watcha, and U+ Mobile TV.

On March 30, 2023, Yoo held her second solo fan meeting, Jiae 2023 Fanmeeting, timed to coincide with her May 21 birthday.

By March 2025, Yoo had built up a filmography as an actress including the films Pinwheel and 4 Minutes 44 Seconds, and the short-form dramas Theory and Practice of Dating and Taeju's Sister Taehee, and was cast in the web drama Today's Weather Is Sexy, playing a full-time investor named Han Na-young.

== Personal life ==
=== Relationship ===
On September 3, 2026, Kwak Si-yang's agency 9ATO Entertainment confirmed that Yoo and Kwak, will get married on November 28.

== Artistry ==
In a 2015 interview, Yoo said that as a child, she was inspired to become a singer after watching the stage performances of S.E.S., and named her fellow Lovelyz members as her closest friends in the entertainment industry. Asked which artist outside the group she would like to grow closer to, she named EXID's Hani.

== Discography ==
=== Singles ===
| Title | Year | Album |
|---|---|---|
| "Delight" | 2013 | Non-album single |

== Filmography ==
=== Films ===
| Year | Title | Role | Ref. |
|---|---|---|---|
| 2023 | Pinwheel | | |
| 2023 | 4 Minutes 44 Seconds | | |

=== Television and web dramas ===
| Year | Title | Role | Notes | Ref. |
|---|---|---|---|---|
| 2010 | You Are My Oppa | Cast member | Infinite's debut variety show | |
| 2022 | Office Cooking | Han Da-eun | Web drama | |
| 2024 | Theory and Practice of Dating | | Short-form drama | |
| 2024 | Taeju's Sister Taehee | | Short-form drama | |
| 2025 | Today's Weather Is Sexy | Han Na-young | Web drama | |
