= Jeong Ye-in =

South Korean singer and actress (born 1998)

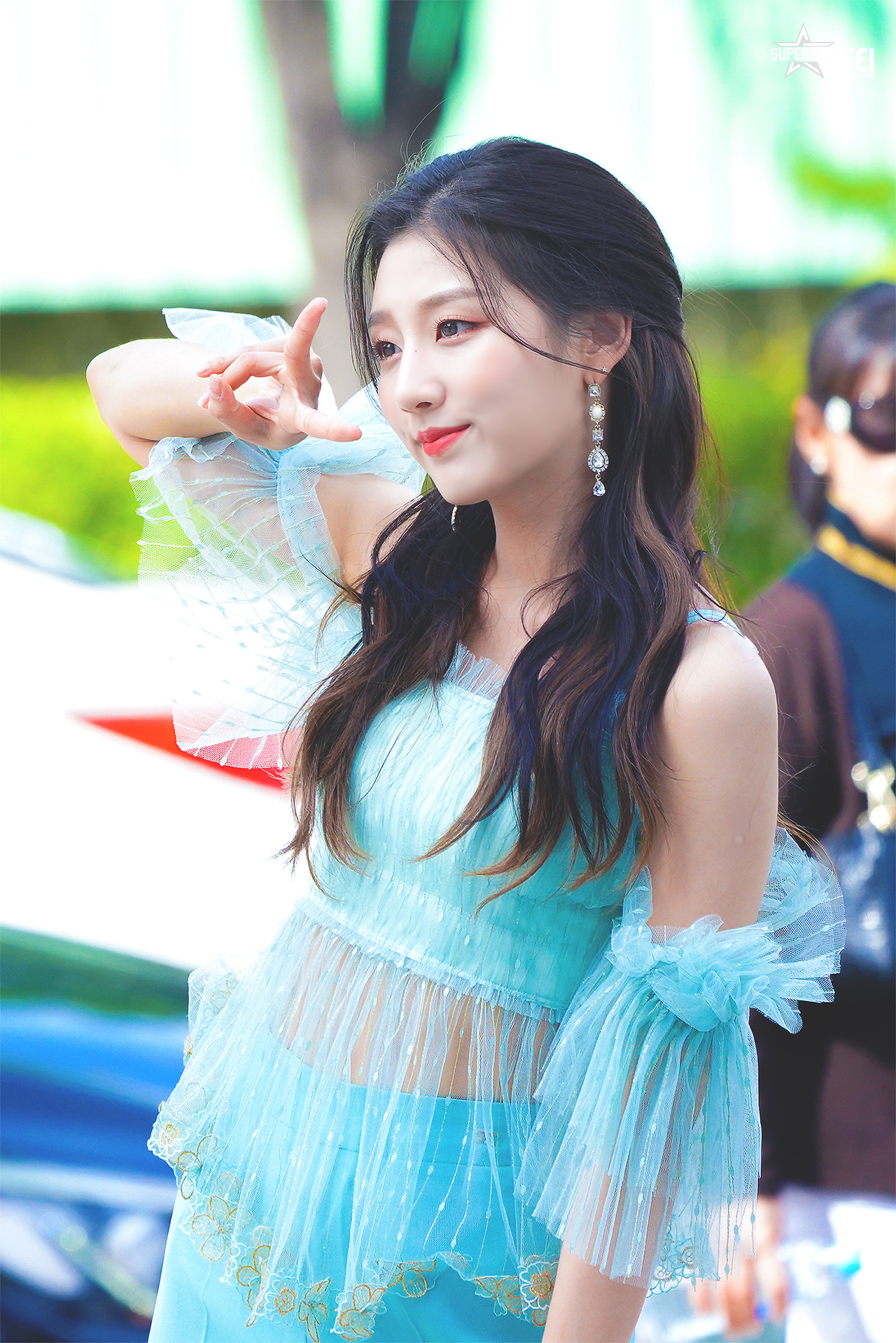
- Jeong in 2019
- Born: June 4, 1998 (age 28); South Korea
- Occupations: Singer; actress
- Years active: 2014–present
- Agent: Sublime
- Musical career
- Genre: K-pop
- Instrument: Vocals
- Label: Woollim
- Member of: Lovelyz
- Website: Official website

Korean name
- Hangul: 정예인
- RR: Jeong Yein
- MR: Chŏng Yein

Jeong Ye-in (Korean: 정예인; born June 4, 1998), known mononymously as Yein, is a South Korean singer and actress. She is a member of the South Korean girl group Lovelyz.

== Career ==
=== 2014–2021: Debut with Lovelyz and solo activities ===
Jeong was introduced as a member of Lovelyz by Woollim Entertainment on November 3, 2014. They debuted with a studio album Girls' Invasion was released on November 17, along with its lead single titled "Candy Jelly Love". On August 16, 2017, Jeong made her acting debut as a young Ha Sun-woo (Moon Chae-won) in the tvN television series Criminal Minds. On October 13, she made her first lead role in the web series The Blue Sea. On January 8, 2020, Jeong was announced as one of the cast members of the SBS reality-documentary show Law of the Jungle in Palawan. On November 1, 2021, Jeong decided to end her contract with Woolim Entertainment.

=== 2022–2024: New agency, solo debut and return to acting ===
On January 11, 2022, she signed an exclusive contract with Sublime Artist Agency and revealed that she was preparing to debut as a solo artist. On January 25, Jeong released her first digital single track "Plus n Minus". On November 23, Jeong was cast in omnibus melodrama web series Love Lock. Later, Jeong made her second digital single track "Bus" which was released on December 2, 2023.

On January 25, 2023, it was revealed that she participated in KakaoTV's virtual competition show Girls Reverse where she played the role of Junghorang, who was eliminated in the 6th episode. On March 18, Jeong released the track "Slow It Down" for JTBC television series Divorce Attorney Shin. Nine days later, she was cast in the TVING youth series Na Ra the Socialite Wannabe, where she plays a high school girl who is full of competitive spirit in everything except studying. On July 11, she starred in an OTT series My Friend's Graduation Ceremony alongside Kim Jong-hyeon and Park Chul-min. On August 14, it was revelead that Jeong had been cast in her musical debut, We Will Rock You, as Scaramouche. On September 2, Jeong released the track "Moon" for B-Play web series The Witch Store Reopening.

On May 16, 2024, Jeong was featured on Ryu Su-jeong's digital single "Orange Juice". On May 29, Jeong became a cast member for the musical Carmilla, playing the role as a lead in the title. May 31, Jeong made her third digital single "I Will Be Your Spring" which was released on June 4. On August 19, she released the track "I'll Get You" for TV Chosun television series DNA Lover. On September 5, Jeong made her 4th digital single track "Dance With Me" which was released on September 11. 2 days later, she released the track "Somewhere" for MBN television series Bad Memory Eraser. On September 19, Jeong was cast alongside Kwon Eun-bin in the mystery thriller series Mystic.

=== 2025–present: Short-form dramas and mini album ===
On January 9, 2025, Jeong made her short-form drama debut in a webtoon-based romance drama Explosive Romance alongside KNK's Lee Dong-won. On February 8, Jeong was cast in the musical Unoya. On March 25, Jeong released her 5th digital single "My One and Only". On October 9, Jeong was featured on Yaru's digital single "When Love Was Ours". On November 7, it was announced that Jeong made her first mini album "Room", which was released digitally on November 22 and released physically on November 24.

On May 29, 2026, Jeong was cast in the play Flower, Stars Pass By (lit.) as Ji-won, with Hong Ji-yoon. On July 8, it was announced that Jeong starred in a GoodShort family short form drama Code Name: Villain Stepmom. In August 2026, CJ ENM announced that Jeong would be host in a TVING reality sports dating series Enemies in the Outfield Seats (lit.) alongside Lee Yong-jin and Jae-gyun Hwang, which is expected to release in September.

In September 2026, Jeong would be cast as Cheon Jang-mi in the second and third seasons of the Netflix series The Trauma Code: Heroes on Call, replacing Ha Young, who departed the series following controversy surrounding her great-grandfather's activities during the Japanese colonial period. Filming for the second and third seasons is scheduled to take place concurrently beginning in October 2026.

== Discography ==
=== Extended plays ===
List of extended plays, showing selected details, selected chart positions, and sales figures
Title	Details	Peak chart positions	Sales
Title	Details	KOR	Sales
Room	Released: November 22, 2025; Label: Sublime; Formats: Digital download, streaming	87	KOR: 940

=== Singles ===
Title	Year	Album
"Plus n Minus"	2022	Non-album single
"Bus"	2022	Non-album single
"I Will Be Your Spring"	2024	Non-album single
"Dance With Me"	2024	Non-album single
"My One and Only"	2025	Non-album single
"Gone Things"	2025	Non-album single
"Landing"	2025	Room
As featured artist
"Orange Juice" (Ryu Su-jeong featuring Jeong Ye-in)	2024	Non-album single
"When Love Was Ours" (Yaru featuring Jeong Ye-in)	2025	90's RECORD PROJECT Part 5

=== Soundtrack appearances ===
List of soundtrack appearances, showing year released and album name
Title	Year	Album
"Slow It Down"	2023	Divorce Attorney Shin OST Part 3
"Moon"	2023	The Witch Store Reopening OST Part 1
"I'll Get You"	2024	DNA Lover OST Part 1
"Somewhere"	2024	Bad Memory Eraser OST Part 5

=== Composition credits ===
All song credits are adapted from the Korea Music Copyright Association's database unless stated otherwise.

List of songs, showing year released, artist name, name of the album, and credited roles
Title	Year	Artist	Album	Composer	Lyricist
"Flying"	2019	Jeon Sang-keun	Miss Lee OST Part 3	Yes	Yes
"I Will Be Your Spring"	2024	Herself	Non-album single	No	Yes
"Smile again"	2025	Doyoung	Namib OST	No	Yes
"My One and Only"	2025	Herself	Non-album single	Yes	Yes
"Moment"	2025	Herself	Non-album single	Yes	No
"Gone Things" (이젠 사라지고 없는 것들)	2025	Herself	Non-album single	Yes	Yes

=== Music videos ===
Title	Year	Director	Ref.
"Plus n Minus"	2022	Unknown	
"Bus"	2022	Yvng Wing(3SPICE)	
"Moon"	2023	Unknown	
"I Will Be Your Spring"	2024	Unknown	
"Dance With Me"	2024	Unknown	
"My One and Only"	2025	김기주 (PIG Edition)	
"Landing"	2025	BOK	
"Adult"	2025	Unknown	

== Filmography ==
=== Television series ===
Year	Title	Role	Notes	Ref.
2016	The Gentlemen of Wolgyesu Tailor Shop	High school girl	Cameo (episode 29)	
2017	Criminal Minds	Ha Sun-woo (young)		
TBA	The Trauma Code: Heroes on Call	Cheon Jang-mi	Season 2–3	

=== Web series ===
Year	Title	Role	Notes	Ref.
2017	The Blue Sea	Jo Hae-ji		
2022	Love Lock	Yoo-yeon	Episode 1: Our First Story, When We Were Clumsy in Love and Breakups	
2023	Na Ra the Socialite Wannabe	Lee Na-ra		
2024	My Friend's Graduation Ceremony	Lee Yeo-wool		
2025	Explosive Romance	Kang Deok-sim	Short-form drama	
2026	The Mysterious Old Money Heirness	Yoo Da-in	Short-form drama	
2026	Vending Machine	Nam Hyun-sun	Short-form drama	
2026	Code Name: Villain Stepmom	Seol-hwa	Short-form drama	
TBA	Mystic	Kang So-hee	Episode 1: Mosquito's Mouth	

=== Television shows ===
Year	Title	Role	Notes	Ref.
2019	King of Mask Singer	Contestant	as "Princess Thumb"	
2020	Law of the Jungle in Palawan	Cast member	Episode 411–415	
2023	Girls Reverse	Contestant	as "Junghorang"	

=== Web shows ===
Year	Title	Role	Ref.
2018	Get It Beauty 2018	Cast member	
2026	Enemies in the Outfield Seats (lit.)	Host	

== Theater ==
Year	Title	Role
2023	We Will Rock You	Scaramouche
2024	Carmilla	Carmilla
2025	Unoya	Min-jeong
2026	Flower, Stars Pass By (lit.)	Ji-won
