= Lovelinus =

- Lovelinus digital cover

Single album by Lovelyz
- Released: December 7, 2015
- Recorded: December 2015
- Genre: K-pop; Dance; Ballad
- Label: Woollim Label; SM C&C; LOEN Entertainment
- Producer: Heuk Tae (Jung Tae-soo)

Lovelyz chronology
Lovelyz8 (2015)	Lovelinus (2015)	A New Trilogy (2016)

Music video
- "For you" on YouTube

Lovelinus is the first single album by South Korean girl group Lovelyz. It was released on December 7, 2015. The album contains three tracks with the title track "For You".

== Background and release ==
On November 25, 2015, Woollim Entertainment announced Lovelyz would make a surprise return through a teaser image that included the "Lovelinus" album logo. Lovelinus is also the official fandom name of Lovelyz. The music video teaser of title track "For You" was released on December 3, 2015 following by the subsequent release of the full version together with the digital album on December 7, 2015.

== Track listing ==
Lovelinus track list
No.	Title	Lyrics	Music	Arrangement	Length
1.	"For You" (그대에게)	Heuk Tae (Jung Tae-soo)	Heuk Tae (Jung Tae-soo)	Heuk Tae (Jung Tae-soo), Jo Seung-joon	3:28
2.	"Circle"	Kim Eana	OnePiece	OnePiece	3:35
3.	"BeBe"	Heuk Tae (Jung Tae-soo), Yoon Jong-seung	Heuk Tae (Jung Tae-soo), Yoon Jong-seung, Jang Jung-seuk	Yoon Jong-seung, Jang Jung-seuk	3:41

== Release history ==
Region	Date	Format	Label
Worldwide	December 7, 2015	Digital download	SM C&C, Woollim Label
South Korea	December 7, 2015	Digital download	Woollim Label, LOEN Entertainment
South Korea	December 9, 2015	CD	Woollim Label, LOEN Entertainment
