= Fall in Lovelyz =

2017 EP by Lovelyz

- Fall In Lovelyz digital cover artwork

EP by Lovelyz
- Released: November 14, 2017
- Recorded: May–October 2017
- Genre: K-pop; Synthpop; R&B
- Length: 21:26
- Language: Korean
- Label: Woollim Entertainment; CJ E&M Music
- Producer: Lee Jung-yeop (exec.); 1Take and TAK; Rphabet; Full8loom; Marco

Lovelyz chronology
R U Ready? (2017)	Fall in Lovelyz (2017)	Heal (2018)

Singles from Fall in Lovelyz
- 1. "Twinkle (종소리)" Released: November 14, 2017

Music video
- "Twinkle" on YouTube

Fall in Lovelyz is the third EP by South Korean girl group Lovelyz. It was released on November 14, 2017 by Woollim Entertainment and distributed by CJ E&M Music. The album contains seven tracks, including the lead single, "Twinkle".

Professional ratings
Review scores
Source	Rating
IZM	3/5 stars

== Background and release ==
In October 2017, Woollim Entertainment announced that Lovelyz would have a comeback. On October 25, Woollim Entertainment released the prologue film of Fall in Lovelyz along with the album's release date. On October 30, Woollim Entertainment released the first concept photos & video teasers of members Kei and Seo Jisoo. The remaining member teasers were released following the first teaser.

On November 4, Lovelyz released short version teaser for their title track "Twinkle", with the full version released on November 10.

On November 14, Woollim Entertainment released the music video for "Twinkle".

== Promotion ==
On November 14, 2017, Lovelyz held their comeback showcase. The promotion for "Twinkle" started on November 17 on KBS' Music Bank. They received their music show first place for "Twinkle" at SBS MTV's The Show.

== Track listing ==
No.	Title	Lyrics	Music	Arrangement	Length
1.	"Spotlight"		1Take, TAK	1Take, TAK	1:13
2.	"Twinkle" (종소리)	1Take, TAK, ARRAN	1Take, TAK	1Take, TAK	3:43
3.	"Triangle" (삼각형)	Razer	Razer, 톰이랑제리	Razer, 톰이랑제리	3:30
4.	"Just" (그냥)	BEE	BEE	BEE	3:21
5.	"Fallin'"	MARCO	MARCO	MARCO	3:33
6.	"Secret Garden" (비밀정원)	Full8loom	Full8loom	Full8loom	3:36
7.	"Sleepy Dream" (졸린 끔)	Shim Kyu-sun	Shim Kyu-sun	Kim Jin-yong	3:50

== Charts ==
=== Weekly charts ===
Chart (2017)	Peak position
Gaon Album Chart	4

=== Year-end chart ===
Chart (2017)	Position
Gaon Album Chart	80

== Release history ==
Region	Date	Format	Label
South Korea	November 14, 2017	CD; digital download	Woollim Entertainment; CJ E&M
Worldwide	November 14, 2017	Digital download	Woollim Entertainment
