= Muse on Music =

Compilation album by Lovelyz
- Released: September 11, 2018
- Recorded: 2014–2017
- Label: Woollim Entertainment; Kakao M
- Producer: Lee Jung-yeop (exec.)

Lovelyz chronology
Heal (2018)	Muse on Music (2018)	Sanctuary (2018)

Muse on Music is the first instrumental compilation album by South Korean girl group Lovelyz. The album was released on September 11, 2018 by Woollim Entertainment and distributed by Kakao M. The album contains 33 tracks, from 8 previous albums.

== Background and release ==
Lovelyz released their first compilation album Muse on Music on September 11. The album contains the instrumental version of 33 tracks selected from their eight released records. It is also the first time a K-pop girl group released such album.

== Track listing ==
Dawn version – Disc 1
No.	Title	Music	Arrangement	Length
1.	"Destiny" (나의 지구)	1Piece	1Piece	3:33
2.	"Getaway" (비밀여행)	1Piece, East4A	1Piece	3:39
3.	"Joyland" (놀이공원)	1Piece	1Piece	3:12
4.	"Goodbye Chapter 1" (이별 Chapter 1)	1Piece	1Piece	2:44
5.	"Fondant" (퐁당)	J.Yoon	J.Yoon	3:30
6.	"WoW!"	1Piece	1Piece	3:05
7.	"Hide and Seek" (숨바꼭질)	Rphabet's Razer, Tom and Jerry	Rphabet's Razer, Tom and Jerry	3:58
8.	"Aya"	J.Yoon	J.Yoon	3:33
9.	"Just" (그냥)	BEE	BEE	3:21
10.	"Sleepy Dream" (졸린 끔)	Shim Kyu-sun	Kim Jin-young	3:50
11.	"Secret Garden" (비밀정원)	Full8loom	Full8loom	3:36
Total length:				35:51

Day version – Disc 2
No.	Title	Music	Arrangement	Length
1.	"Hi~" (안녕)	1Piece	1Piece	3:26
2.	"Candy Jelly Love"	1Piece	1Piece	3:42
3.	"Ah-Choo"	1Piece	1Piece	3:38
4.	"Hug Me" (안아줘)	J.Yoon	J.Yoon	3:45
5.	"For You" (그대에게)	Heuk Tae (Jung Tae-soo)	Heuk Tae (Jung Tae-soo), Jo Seung-joon	3:28
6.	"1cm"	Razer, Strike	Rphabet, Strike	3:41
7.	"Cameo"	Sim Eunjee, The Kick Sound	Sim Eunjee	3:19
8.	"Emotion"	Sweetune	Sweetune	3:10
9.	"Now, We" (지금, 우리)	1Piece	1Piece	3:16
10.	"Twinkle" (종소리)	1Take, TAK	1Take, TAK	3:43
11.	"Triangle" (삼각형)	Rphabet's Razer, Tom and Jerry	Rphabet's Razer, Tom and Jerry	3:30
Total length:				36:38

Night version – Disc 3
No.	Title	Music	Arrangement	Length
1.	"Good Night Like Yesterday" (어제처럼 굿나잇)	1Piece	1Piece	3:41
2.	"Stranger (Babysoul Solo)" (feat. Wheesung) (남보다 못한 사이)	G-High, Lee Ju-hyung	G-High, Lee Ju-hyung	3:53
3.	"Gone (JIN Solo)" (너만 없다)	Han Jae Ho, Kim Seung-soo, Hwang Hyun, Hong Seung Hyun	Han Jae Ho, Kim Seung-soo, Hwang Hyun, Hong Seung Hyun	3:58
4.	"Shooting Star" (작별하나)	Sweetch, Oreo	Sweetch, Oreo	3:14
5.	"Circle"	1Piece	1Piece	3:35
6.	"Bookmark" (책갈피)	1Piece	1Piece	3:28
7.	"Morning Star" (새벽별) (Babysoul & Kei & JIN)	1Piece	1Piece	3:31
8.	"First Snow" (첫눈)	Rphabet's Razer, Choi Moon-suk	Rphabet's Razer, Choi Moon-suk	3:20
9.	"Night and Day"	Rphabet's BEE	Rphabet's BEE	4:25
10.	"Fallin'"	MARCO	MARCO	3:29
11.	"Baby Doll" (인형)	Kissmaker	Yang Shi-on	3:26
Total length:				37:60

== Charts ==
Chart (2018)	Peak position
South Korean Albums (Gaon)	9
