= Once Upon a Time (EP) =

- Digital and Special Limited edition cover

EP by Lovelyz
- Released: May 20, 2019
- Recorded: 2019
- Genre: K-pop; synth-pop
- Length: 19:09
- Language: Korean
- Label: Woollim; Kakao M
- Producer: Lee Jung-yeop (exec.)

Lovelyz chronology
Sanctuary (2018)	Once Upon a Time (2019)	Unforgettable (2020)

Singles from Once Upon a Time
- 1. "그 시절 우리가 사랑했던 우리 (Beautiful Days)" Released: May 20, 2019

Music video
- "Beautiful Days" on YouTube

Once Upon a Time is the sixth extended play (EP) by South Korean girl group Lovelyz. The album was released on May 20, 2019 by Woollim Entertainment and distributed by Kakao M. The album contains six tracks, including the lead single "Beautiful Days".

== Background and release ==
On May 8, Woollim Entertainment released the concept picture for Once Upon a Time along with the release date on May 20. They start releasing the individual teaser picture for the album in the next day through the group's official accounts on Twitter and Facebook. The short version teaser of the title track was uploaded in YouTube and Twitter on May 14.

The title track "Beautiful Days" was revealed with the release of the album's tracklist on May 16. The next day, Lovelyz released a longer version of the music video teaser for "Beautiful Days". Their EP officially released online and physically on May 20 along with their comeback showcase.

== Composition ==
Billboard's Tamar Herman described the lead single "Beautiful Days (When We Were Us)" as a bright and airy synth-pop track with quirky retro synths. Lyrically it tells the story of the most beautiful time.

== Track listing ==
No.	Title	Lyrics	Music	Arrangement	Length
1.	"Once Upon a Time"		SPACECOWBOY	SPACECOWBOY	0:57
2.	"Beautiful Days" (그 시절 우리가 사랑했던 우리) (lit. When We Were Us)	danke	SPACECOWBOY	SPACECOWBOY	3:53
3.	"Close to You"	Kim Ea-na; SEION; Jung Ho-hyun (e.one)	SEION; Jung Ho-hyun (e. one)	Jung Ho-hyun (e.one)	3:37
4.	"Sweet Luv"	Jinri (Full8loom)	영광의 얼굴들 (Full8loom); Jinri (Full8loom); Jake K (Full8loom)	영광의 얼굴들 (Full8loom); Jake K (Full8loom)	3:05
5.	"Secret Story"	JADE; Kim A-reum; MIYAO	SPACECOWBOY; JADE	SPACECOWBOY; JADE; NV; Choi Young-jun	4:34
6.	"Love Game"	Ollounder; LEEZ	LEEZ; Ollounder	LEEZ; Ollounder	3:02
Total length:					19:09

== Charts ==
Chart (2019)	Peak position
South Korean Albums (Gaon)	6
