= Unforgettable (EP) =

- Digital cover artwork

EP by Lovelyz
- Released: September 1, 2020
- Recorded: 2020
- Genre: Future bass; Retro; Ballad; Pop rock
- Language: Korean
- Label: Woollim; Kakao M
- Producer: Lee Jung-yeop (exec.)

Lovelyz chronology
Once Upon a Time (2019)	Unforgettable (2020)

Singles from Unforgettable
- 1. "Obliviate" Released: September 1, 2020

Music video
- "Obliviate" on YouTube

Unforgettable is the seventh extended play (EP) and recent release by South Korean girl group Lovelyz. The album was released on September 1, 2020, by Woollim Entertainment and distributed by Kakao M. The album contains six tracks, including the lead single "Obliviate". This is their last album before the group went into indefinite hiatus after all members, except Baby Soul, decided not to renew their contracts and left Woollim Entertainment.

Professional ratings
Review scores
Source	Rating
IZM	3.5/5 stars

== Background and release ==
After the TV series Queendom in 2019, the group went on hiatus to focus on individual activities. Member Kei made her solo debut in October 2019, followed by Sujeong who made her solo debut in May 2020. During this time the group mentioned that they were working for the upcoming album and hinting about the possible comeback through social media.

On August 3, Woollim Entertainment announced that the group will make their comeback in September, their first in 1 year and 4 months. On August 17, a teaser video was released, and revealed the album title, along with the release date on September 1. The album was finally released on September 1 along with the music video for the title track 'Obliviate'.

== Track listing ==
No.	Title	Lyrics	Music	Arrangement	Length
1.	"Unforgettable"		Stardust	Stardust	0:46
2.	"Obliviate"	Stardust; Ryu Su-jeong; Jarry Potter (Yummy Tone)	Stardust; Jarry Potter (Yummy Tone)	Stardust	3:22
3.	"Dream in a Dream" (자각몽)	danke	J.Yoon	J.Yoon	3:07
4.	"Never, Secret" (절대, 비밀)	Seo Ji-eum	DAVINK	DAVINK	3:57
5.	"Memories" (이야기꽃)	Jung Ho-hyun (e.one)	Jung Ho-Hyun (e.one)	Jung Ho-hyun (e.one)	3:44
6.	"Worry Dolls" (걱정 인형)	Jang Yeo-jin (Lalalastudio)	Zaydro (CODE 9)	Zaydro (CODE 9)	3:33
Total length:					18:29

== Charts ==
Chart (2019)	Peak position
South Korean Albums (Gaon)	5
