= R U Ready? =

- Digital cover

Studio album by Lovelyz
- Released: February 26, 2017; May 2, 2017 (repackaged edition)
- Recorded: 2016–2017
- Genre: Bubblegum pop; R&B
- Length: 36:08; 42:58 (repackaged edition)
- Language: Korean
- Label: Woollim Entertainment; CJ E&M Music
- Producer: Lee Jung Yup; 1Piece; Sweetune; Rphabet

Lovelyz chronology
A New Trilogy (2016)	R U Ready? (2017)	Fall in Lovelyz (2017)

Singles from R U Ready?
- 1. "WoW!" Released: February 26, 2017

Repackaged album cover
- Now, We digital cover artwork

Singles from Now, We
- 1. "지금, 우리 (Now, We)" Released: May 2, 2017

Music video
- "WoW!" on YouTube "Now, We" on YouTube

R U Ready? is the second studio album recorded by South Korean girl group Lovelyz. It was released digitally and physically on February 26, 2017 by Woollim Entertainment and distributed by CJ E&M Music. The album was re-released under the title Now, We on May 2, 2017.

This album and its repackage are the second and third part of their 'Love' trilogy, the sequel to their previous EP A New Trilogy.

Professional ratings
Review scores
Source	Rating
IZM	3.5/5 stars

== Background and release ==
=== R U Ready? ===
On January 17, 2017, it was confirmed that Lovelyz would be making their comeback in February. On February 7, Woollim Entertainment announced Lovelyz would be releasing their second studio album on February 27. On February 8, Lovelyz officially announced that their second studio album would be called R U Ready?. Lovelyz released teaser group on February 14 and individual teasers on February 20. On February 21, the album's tracklist was revealed and a reschedule for the album's release was brought forward to February 26 at 10:00 p.m. KST.

=== Now, We ===
On April 19, Woollim Entertainment announced that Lovelyz would be making a comeback in early-May. The next day, Lovelyz released "Peek Version" of prologue film for repackaged album titled Now, We, which would be released on May 2. A re-packaged edition of the album, Now, We, was officially released on May 2, 2017. This edition includes two new songs: "Now, We" and "Aya".

== Music video ==
=== WoW! ===
This music video was inspired by The Art of Pop Art & Cutout Animation, including dance and solo singing scene. The music video includes easter eggs like their picture from debut to familiar scenes of their previous music video like marbles from Destiny and a picture of Bulldaegal from South Korean punk band "No Brain" who is a fan of Lovelyz.

== Promotion ==
On February 9, 2017, Lovelyz shoot their first comeback variety show appearance on the Weekly Idol.

A promotional showcase for R U Ready? was held at Samsung Blue Square Hall, Seoul on February 27, 2017 with Super Junior's Heechul and Yoonsang as the MC. They began the album promotion on South Korean music television programs on March 2, 2017. Member Yein was absent from promotional activities due to an injury she sustained during the comeback practice. It was announced that member Yein had recovering from her injury and will be able to joining promotional activities started on March 23.

== Track listing ==
R U Ready?
No.	Title	Lyrics	Music	Arrangement	Length
1.	"R U Ready?"		OnePiece	OnePiece	0:32
2.	"WoW!"	Jeon Gan-di; Kim Yi-na	OnePiece	OnePiece	3:06
3.	"Cameo"	Sim Eunjee; The Kick Sound	Sim Eunjee; The Kick Sound	Sim Eunjee	3:20
4.	"Emotion"	Sweetune	Sweetune	Sweetune	3:11
5.	"Morning Star" (새벽별) (Sung by Baby Soul, Kei and JIN)	Jang Yeon-jeong	OnePiece	OnePiece	3:31
6.	"First Snow" (첫눈)	Rphabet's Razer	Rphabet's Razer; Choi Moon-suk	Rphabet's Razer; Choi Moon-suk	3:17
7.	"Knock Knock" (똑똑)	Seo Ji-eum	OnePiece	OnePiece	3:27
8.	"The" (Sung by Lee Mi-joo, Ryu Su-jeong and Jeong Ye-in)	Sweetune; Min Yeon-jae	Sweetune	Sweetune	3:43
9.	"Night and Day"	Rphabet's BEE	Rphabet's BEE	Rphabet's BEE	4:25
10.	"Hide and Seek" (숨바꼭질)	Rphabet's Razer; Ryu Su-jeong	Rphabet's Razer; Tom and Jerry	Rphabet's Razer; Tom and Jerry	3:59
11.	"My Little Lover" (나의 연인) (Sung by Yoo Ji-ae and Seo Ji-soo)	Jeon Gan-di	Mayumi Kojima	Yang Si-on	3:37
Total length:					36:08

Now, We (지금, 우리) – Repackaged album
No.	Title	Lyrics	Music	Arrangement	Length
1.	"R U Ready?"		OnePiece	OnePiece	0:32
2.	"WoW!"	Jeon Gan-di; Kim Yi-na	OnePiece	OnePiece	3:06
3.	"Now, We" (지금, 우리)	Seo Ji-eum	OnePiece	OnePiece	3:16
4.	"Aya"	J.Yoon	J.Yoon	J.Yoon	3:34
5.	"Cameo"	Sim Eunjee; The Kick Sound	Sim Eunjee; The Kick Sound	Sim Eunjee	3:20
6.	"Emotion"	Sweetune	Sweetune	Sweetune	3:11
7.	"Morning Star" (새벽별) (Sung by Baby Soul, Kei and JIN)	Jang Yeon-jeong	OnePiece	OnePiece	3:31
8.	"First Snow" (첫눈)	Rphabet's Razer	Rphabet's Razer; Choi Moon-suk	Rphabet's Razer; Choi Moon-suk	3:17
9.	"Knock Knock" (똑똑)	Seo Ji-eum	OnePiece	OnePiece	3:27
10.	"The" (Sung by Lee Mi-joo, Ryu Su-jeong and Jeong Ye-in)	Sweetune; Min Yeon-jae	Sweetune	Sweetune	3:43
11.	"Night and Day"	Rphabet's BEE	Rphabet's BEE	Rphabet's BEE	4:25
12.	"Hide and Seek" (숨바꼭질)	Rphabet's Razer; Ryu Su-jeong	Rphabet's Razer; Tom and Jerry	Rphabet's Razer; Tom and Jerry	3:59
13.	"My Little Lover" (나의 연인) (Sung by Yoo Ji-ae and Seo Ji-soo)	Jeon Gan-di	Mayumi Kojima	Yang Si-on	3:37
Total length:					42:58

== Charts ==
=== Weekly charts ===
Edition	Chart (2017)	Peak position
R U Ready?	South Korean albums (Gaon)	2
R U Ready?	Japanese albums (Oricon)	44
Now, We	South Korean albums (Gaon)	1

=== Year-end chart ===
Edition	Chart (2017)	Position
R U Ready?	South Korean albums (Gaon)	77

== Release history ==
Edition	Region	Date	Format	Label	Ref.
R U Ready?	South Korea	February 26, 2017	CD; digital download	Woollim Entertainment; CJ E&M	
R U Ready?	Worldwide	February 26, 2017	Digital download	Woollim Entertainment	
Now, We	South Korea	May 2, 2017	CD; digital download	Woollim Entertainment; CJ E&M	
Now, We	Worldwide	May 2, 2017	Digital Download	Woollim Entertainment	
