= Heal (Lovelyz EP) =

- Digital cover

EP by Lovelyz
- Released: April 23, 2018
- Recorded: 2017–2018
- Genres: K-pop; Synth-pop
- Length: 17:50
- Language: Korean
- Labels: Woollim Entertainment; Kakao M
- Producers: Lee Jung-yeop (exec.); SWEETUNE; 1Take and TAK; DAVINK; Razer; Shim Eun-ji; The Kick Sound

Lovelyz chronology
Fall in Lovelyz (2017)	Heal (2018)	Muse on Music (2018)

Singles from Heal
- 1. "That Day (그날의 너)" Released: April 23, 2018

Music video
- "That Day" on YouTube

Heal (Korean: 치유; Hanja: 治癒; RR: Chiyu) is the fourth extended play (EP) by South Korean girl group Lovelyz. The album was released on April 23, 2018 by Woollim Entertainment and distributed by Kakao M. The album contains six tracks, including the lead single "That Day".

== Background and release ==
On April 6, Woollim Entertainment announced that Lovelyz would make a comeback on April 23. Promotion for the album began with the release of individual teasers of members through the group's official accounts on Twitter and Facebook from April 10 to April 13, with the group teasers being released on April 17. Through these teasers, the name of the album was unveiled, titled Heal. The lead single "That Day" was revealed with the release of the album's tracklist on April 19. The next day, Lovelyz released a longer version of the music video teaser for "That Day", and teased some parts of the chorus. Their EP officially released online and physically on April 23.

== Promotions ==
Lovelyz held their comeback showcase at Blue Square iMarket Hall on April 23, 2018, the same day as the album's release, and was hosted by comedian Park Sung-kwang. It was broadcast live through the Naver app V-Live. During the showcase, they discussed their new songs, including the lead single "That Day", which they performed live for the first time. Lovelyz began their music show promotions, with their first comeback stage on Mnet's M Countdown where they performed "That Day" and "Watercolor" on April 26. They earned their first music show win for "That Day" on SBS MTV's The Show on May 1.

== Composition ==
"That Day (그날의 너)" was written and composed by Sweetune, who previously produced "Emotion" and "The" in the second studio album R U Ready?. The song is described as "having a melodious and energetic melody reminiscent of "Ah-Choo", with the members' voices blended together to fit the season perfectly". The composers of the lead single "Twinkle" of the previous EP Fall in Lovelyz, 1Take and TAK, returned with a new b-side track titled "Shining★Star".

== Commercial performance ==
Heal topped the iTunes K-pop Music Albums in the United States and Hong Kong in the first week of its release.

== Track listing ==
No.	Title	Lyrics	Music	Arrangement	Length
1.	"Heal" (治癒) (치유)		Sweetune	Sweetune	0:55
2.	"That Day" (그날의 너)	Sweetune	Sweetune	Sweetune	3:14
3.	"Mi-myo Mi-myo" (미묘미묘해; also known as Bizarre)	Shim Eun-ji; The Kick Sound; Kim Eun-soo	Shim Eun-ji; The Kick Sound	Shim Eun-ji; The Kick Sound	3:02
4.	"Temptation"	Davink	Davink	Davink	3:27
5.	"Watercolor" (수채화)	Razer (Strike)	Razer (Strike); Hongdi	Razer (Strike); Hongdi	3:48
6.	"SHINING★STAR"	1Take; TAK; Arran	1Take; TAK	1Take; TAK	3:20
Total length:					17:50

== Charts ==
Chart (2018)	Peak position
South Korean Albums (Gaon)	2
Japanese Albums (Oricon)	43
Taiwanese Albums (Five Music)	10

== Release history ==
Region	Date	Format	Label
South Korea	April 23, 2018	CD; digital download	Woollim Entertainment; Kakao M
Worldwide	April 23, 2018	Digital download	Woollim Entertainment
