= Girls' Invasion =

- Girls' Invasion digital cover artwork

Studio album by Lovelyz
- Released: November 17, 2014
- Recorded: 2011–2014
- Venue: Seoul, South Korea
- Studio: Woollim Studios
- Genre: K-pop; dance; R&B
- Length: 29:15; 36:08 (Repackage edition)
- Language: Korean
- Label: Woollim Label; SM C&C; LOEN Entertainment

Lovelyz chronology
Girls' Invasion (2014)	Lovelyz8 (2015)

Singles from Girls' Invasion
- 1. "Good Night Like Yesterday" Released: November 12, 2014; 2. "Candy Jelly Love" Released: November 17, 2014

Repackaged album cover
- Hi~ digital cover artwork

Singles from Hi~
- 1. "Hi~" Released: March 3, 2015

Music video
- "Good Night Like Yesterday" on YouTube
- "Candy Jelly Love" on YouTube
- "Hi~" on YouTube

Girls' Invasion is the debut studio album by South Korean girl group Lovelyz. The album was released digitally and physically on November 17, 2014, by Woollim Label and distributed by LOEN Entertainment. The album contains nine tracks including the lead single "Candy Jelly Love". On March 3, 2015, the album was re-released as Hi~ with two new songs, including the lead single of the same name.

The album starts Lovelyz's school-themed Girls trilogy. The theme continued with the release of the album repackage Hi~ and finally concluded with the release of their EP Lovelyz8 (2015).

== Background and release ==
=== Girls' Invasion ===
On November 3, 2014, Woollim Entertainment announced their first girl group Lovelyz. Woollim Entertainment also released the first teaser image, revealing the group's 8-member lineup as well as details for their debut. The group would have a pre-release on November 10 and a showcase on November 12 while their debut album would drop on November 17.

On November 4, Lovelyz released individual and group teaser images and a pre-debut video, showing behind the scenes footage of the girls preparing for their debut. It was also announced that the name of their debut album would be "Girls' Invasion". On November 10, a pre-release track "Good Night Like Yesterday" was released with the accompanying music video, starring Infinite's Sungkyu alongside the Lovelyz members. The album preview video was released on the same day. On November 17, Lovelyz officially released their debut album with title track "Candy Jelly Love". On December 3, the group released a choreography version for "Candy Jelly Love".

=== Hi~ ===
On February 22, 2015, Woollim Entertainment announced that Lovelyz would be releasing a repackaged version of the album on March 3, including two new songs. It was also confirmed that Jisoo would remain absent for the upcoming promotions. On February 23, Lovelyz released a teaser video for their new track "Hi~". On March 3, Lovelyz released the repackaged album "Hi~"and its music video.

== Promotion ==
Before its debut, Woollim Entertainment confirmed that Seo Jisoo wouldn't participate in debut promotions due to personal issues. Lovelyz held their debut showcase on November 12 at the K-ART Hall in Olympic Park. The group had their official debuted stage, performing "Good Night Like Yesterday" & "Candy Jelly Love" on November 13. After the album release, the group would perform "Candy Jelly Love" on weekly music show with another track from the album, "Getaway."

== Track listing ==
=== Girls' Invasion ===
No.	Title	Lyrics	Music	Arrangement	Length
1.	"Introducing The Candy" (Intro)		OnePiece	OnePiece	0:55
2.	"Candy Jelly Love"	Kim Eana	OnePiece	OnePiece	3:45
3.	"Good Night Like Yesterday" (어제처럼 굿나잇)	Kim Eana	OnePiece	OnePiece	3:39
4.	"Goodbye Chapter 1" (이별 Chapter 1)	Kim Eana	OnePiece	OnePiece	2:44
5.	"Getaway" (비밀여행)	Enne	OnePiece, East4A	OnePiece	3:42
6.	"Stranger" (남보다 못한 사이) (Baby Soul Feat. Wheesung)	Song Soo-yoon	G-High, Lee Ju-hyung	G-High, Lee Ju-hyung	4:08
7.	"She's a Flirt" (Baby Soul & Kei feat. Dongwoo of INFINITE) (그녀는 바람둥이야)	Ahn Young Min, Dongwoo	Ahn Young Min	Ahn Young Min	3:14
8.	"Delight" (Yoo Ji-ae)	Song Soo-yoon	Han Jae-ho, Kim Seung-soo	Han Jae-ho, Kim Seung-soo, Hwang Hyun, Hong Seung Hyun	3:28
9.	"Gone" (너만 없다) (JIN)	Song Soo-yoon	Han Jae Ho, Kim Seung-soo, Hwang Hyun	Han Jae Ho, Kim Seung-soo, Hwang Hyun, Hong Seung Hyun	3:58

=== Hi~ (Repackaged album) ===
No.	Title	Lyrics	Music	Arrangement	Length
1.	"Introducing the Candy" (Intro)		OnePiece	OnePiece	0:55
2.	"Candy Jelly Love"	Kim Eana	OnePiece	OnePiece	3:45
3.	"Hi~" (안녕)	Seo Ji-eum	OnePiece	OnePiece	3:39
4.	"Joyland" (놀이공원)	Seo Ji-eum	OnePiece	OnePiece	2:44
5.	"Good Night Like Yesterday"	Kim Eana	OnePiece	OnePiece	3:42
6.	"Goodbye Chapter 1" (이별 Chapter 1)	Kim Eana	OnePiece	OnePiece	4:08
7.	"Getaway" (비밀여행)	Enne	OnePiece, East4A	OnePiece	3:14
8.	"Stranger" (남보다 못한 사이) (Baby Soul Feat. Wheesung)	Song Soo-yoon	G-High, Lee Ju-hyung	G-High, Lee Ju-hyung	3:28
9.	"She's a Flirt" (Baby Soul & Kei feat. Dongwoo of Infinite) (그녀는 바람둥이야)	Ahn Young Min Dongwoo	Ahn Young Min	Ahn Young Min	3:58
10.	"Delight" (Yoo JiAe)	Song Soo-yoon	Han Jae-ho, Kim Seung-soo	Han Jae-ho, Kim Seung-soo, Hwang Hyun, Hong Seung Hyun	3:28
11.	"Gone" (너만 없다) (JIN)	Song Soo-yoon	Han Jae Ho, Kim Seung-soo, Hwang Hyun	Han Jae Ho, Kim Seung-soo, Hwang Hyun, Hong Seung Hyun	3:15

== Charts ==
=== Albums ===
Girls' Invasion

Chart	Peak position
South Korea Gaon Weekly Albums Chart	7
South Korea Gaon Monthly Albums Chart	16

Hi~

Chart	Peak position
South Korea Gaon Weekly Albums Chart	4
South Korea Gaon Monthly Albums Chart	12

=== Singles ===
Candy Jelly Love

Chart	Peak position
Gaon Singles chart	48

Hi~

Chart	Peak position
Gaon Singles chart	23

== Sales and certifications ==
Chart	Amount
Gaon Charts	*KOR: 11,377

== Release history ==
Edition	Region	Date	Format	Label
Girls' Invasion	South Korea	November 17, 2014	CD, digital download	Woollim Label, LOEN Entertainment
Girls' Invasion	Worldwide	November 17, 2014	Digital download	SM C&C, Woollim Label
Hi~	South Korea	March 3, 2015	CD, digital download	Woollim Label, LOEN Entertainment
Hi~	Worldwide	March 3, 2015	Digital download	SM C&C, Woollim Label
