= Sanctuary (Lovelyz EP) =

- Digital and Special Limited edition cover

EP by Lovelyz
- Released: November 26, 2018
- Recorded: 2018
- Genre: K-pop; Synth-pop
- Length: 22:47
- Language: Korean
- Label: Woollim Entertainment; Kakao M
- Producer: Lee Jung-yeop (exec.); SWEETUNE; 1Take and TAK; Arran; SPACECOWBOY; JPG

Lovelyz chronology
Muse on Music (2018)	Sanctuary (2018)	Once Upon a Time (2019)

Singles from Sanctuary
- 1. "Lost N Found (찾아가세요)" Released: November 26, 2018

Music video
- "Lost N Found" on YouTube

Sanctuary is the fifth extended play (EP) by South Korean girl group Lovelyz. The album was released on November 26, 2018, by Woollim Entertainment and distributed by Kakao M. The album contains seven tracks, including the lead single "Lost N Found".

== Background and release ==
On October 30, Woollim Entertainment announced that Lovelyz would make a comeback on November 26. Promotion for the album began with the release of individual teasers of members and the short version of music video teaser through the group's official accounts on Twitter, Facebook, and YouTube from November 15 to November 20. Through these teasers, the name of the album was unveiled, titled Sanctuary. The title track "Lost N Found" was revealed with the release of the album's tracklist on November 21. The next day, Lovelyz released a longer version of the music video teaser for "Lost N Found". Their EP officially released online and physically on November 26.

== Promotions ==
Lovelyz held their comeback showcase at Yes24 Live Hall on November 26, 2018, the same day as the album release.

== Track listing ==
No.	Title	Lyrics	Music	Arrangement	Length
1.	"Never Ending"		Spacecowboy	Spacecowboy	1:05
2.	"Lost N Found" (찾아가세요)	Sweetune	Spacecowboy; 1988	Spacecowboy; NV	3:01
3.	"Like U"	1Take; TAK; ARRAN	1Take; TAK; ARRAN	1Take; TAK	3:27
4.	"Rewind"	Heuktae	Heuktae; Jang Jeong-seok	Jang Jeong-seok	3:44
5.	"Rain"	JPG (Hwang Seong-je; Seo Mi-rae; Baek Gyeong-jin)	JPG (Jeong Su-min; Kim Min-young)	JPG (Jeong Su-min)	4:47
6.	"Daydream" (백일몽)	Jeong Ho-hyeon (e.one); Babysoul	Jeong Ho-hyeon (e.one)	Jeong Ho-hyeon (e.one)	3:11
7.	"Floral" (꽃점)	danke	J.Yoon	J.Yoon	3:32
Total length:					22:47

== Charts ==
Chart (2018)	Peak position
South Korean Albums (Gaon)	8
