= A New Trilogy =

- Digital cover

EP by Lovelyz
- Released: April 25, 2016
- Recorded: 2015–2016
- Genre: K-pop; dance
- Length: 21:42
- Label: Woollim Label; SM C&C; LOEN Entertainment
- Producer: Yoon Sang

Lovelyz chronology
Lovelinus (2015)	A New Trilogy (2016)	R U Ready? (2017)

Singles from A New Trilogy
- 1. "Destiny (나의 지구)" Released: April 25, 2016

Music video
- "Destiny" on YouTube

A New Trilogy is the second extended play by South Korean girl group Lovelyz. It was released on April 25, 2016, by Woollim Label and distributed by LOEN Entertainment. The EP consists of seven tracks, including the lead single "Destiny". The EP is the first part of their second trilogy 'Love'.

== Background and release ==
On April 4, 2016 Woollim Entertainment released the teaser for A New Trilogy. On April 19, the prologue video was released. On April 21, the track listing was revealed to include seven tracks, including the lead single "Destiny". On April 22, the teaser music video was released. On April 23, the mini-album preview video was released. A New Trilogy was officially released alongside the music video for "Destiny" on April 25.

== Reception ==
The lead single "Destiny" was praised by American producer Brent Fischer for its "world-class grooves and current arrangements". He also expressed his interest in helping the group's entry into the American music industry.

== Track listing ==
No.	Title	Lyrics	Music	Arrangement	Length
1.	"Moonrise"		OnePiece	OnePiece	0:40
2.	"Destiny" (나의 지구; lit. My World)	Jun Kan-di	OnePiece	OnePiece	3:33
3.	"Fondant" (퐁당)	J.Yoon	J.Yoon	J.Yoon	3:29
4.	"Bookmark" (책갈피)	ReRikRu	OnePiece	OnePiece	3:28
5.	"1cm"	Razer, Strike	Razer, Strike	Rphabet, Strike	3:41
6.	"Dear You" (마음 (*취급주의); lit. Heart (*Handle With Care))	Seo Ji-eum	OnePiece	OnePiece	3:54
7.	"Baby Doll" (인형)	Jun Kan-di	Kissmaker	Yang Shi-on	3:27

== Charts ==
=== Weekly chart ===
Chart (2016)	Peak position
South Korean Albums (Gaon)	5

=== Year-end chart ===
Chart (2016)	Position
South Korean Albums (Gaon)	83

== Release history ==
Region	Date	Format	Label
South Korea	April 25, 2016	CD, digital download	Woollim Label, LOEN Entertainment
Worldwide	April 25, 2016	Digital download	SM C&C, Woollim Label
