= OnePiece (music production team) =

South Korean music production team

- Also known as: 1Piece
- Origin: South Korea
- Genres: synthpop, electronica
- Years active: 2014–present
- Labels: ode INC; Digitalian Studio
- Members: Yoon Sang, Davink(lm Hyung-bin) (다빈크), Spacecowboy(Park Sung-jin)(스페이스 카우보이), wan9u (Wan Gu)

OnePiece (Korean: 원피스) is a Korean production team composed of musicians Yoon Sang, Davink, wan9u, and Spacecowboy. OnePiece made their debut without wan9u in November 2015 with a hip-hop and EDM genre mix of the song "Let's Get It" featuring Dok2. OnePiece has contributed extensively to the Korean girl group Lovelyz's music. Wan9u joined the group in 2016.

== Formation and production history ==
OnePiece was formed around producer and singer Yoon Sang in 2014. Yoon Sang and Spacecowboy first collaborated when Spacecowboy provided the rhythm track for Yoon Sang's 2014 single "If you wanna console me…(날 위로하려거든)". Davink worked on Yoon Sang's The Duets album and, after their work on that album, the group officially formed.

Their sound is mostly electronica-based, using synthesizers to create a retro feel. OnePiece has provided a lot of the musical direction for Lovelyz's sound, and are credited with helping them maintain a distinctive "color" of music with consistent sales, and popularity. This popularity was especially reflected with the OnePiece-produced track "Ah-Choo" which ended up being sleeper hit that had a long life on Korean music charts in 2015.
