= Lovelyz =

South Korean girl group

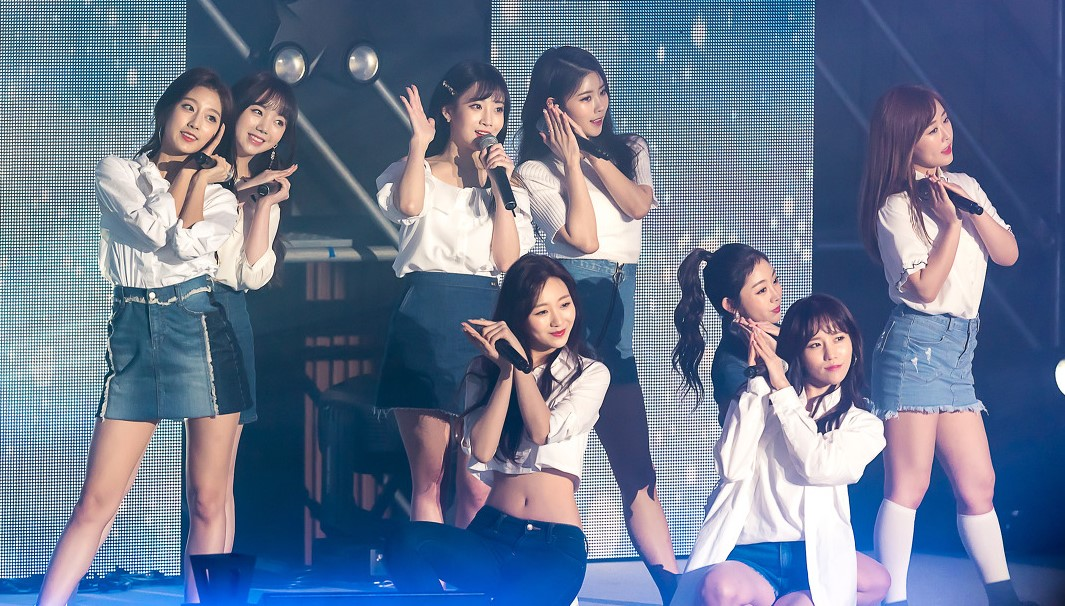
- Lovelyz in April 2018

Background information
- Origin: Seoul, South Korea
- Genres: K-pop; bubblegum pop; synth-pop
- Years active: 2014–2021; 2024–2025
- Label: Woollim
- Members: Baby Soul; Jiae; Jisoo; Mijoo; Kei; Jin; Sujeong; Yein
- Website: lvlz8.com

Lovelyz (Korean: 러블리즈) is a South Korean girl group formed in 2014 by Woollim Entertainment and is the company's first girl group. The group consists of eight members: Baby Soul, Jiae, Jisoo, Mijoo, Kei, Jin, Sujeong, and Yein. Their debut album, Girls' Invasion, was released on November 17, 2014.

== History ==
=== 2014: Debut and finding success ===
Lovelyz's debut was first announced on November 5, 2014, by Woollim Entertainment. Lovelyz released a pre-release digital single, "Good Night Like Yesterday", on the same day. Their debut showcase was held on November 12 at the K-ART Hall in Olympic Park, and their debut stage was on the next day on Mnet M Countdown. The group's debut studio album Girls' Invasion was officially released on November 17, along with its lead single titled "Candy Jelly Love". The album ranked ninth on Taiwan's Five Music Korea-Japan weekly chart and first on Japan's Tower Records albums chart. Prior to debut, member Jisoo withdrew from the group's debut promotions for personal reasons.

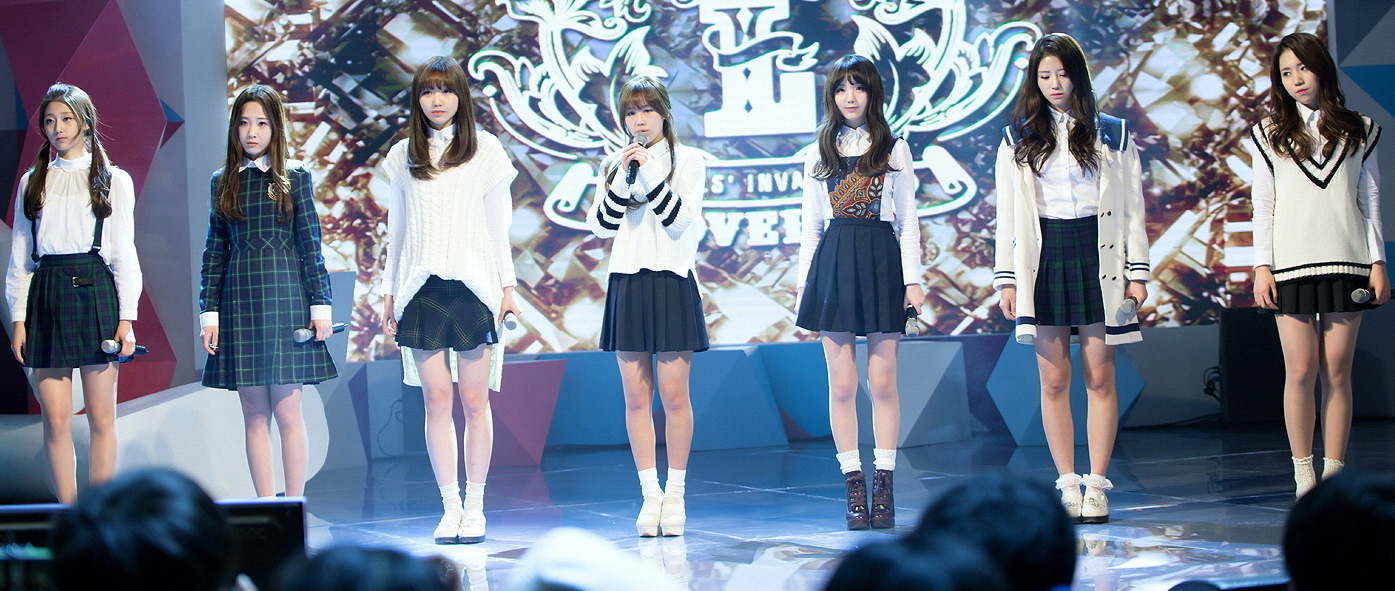
Lovelyz at SBS Gayo Daejun in 2014

On December 21, the group took part in the annual music festival SBS Gayo Daejeon for the festival's segment Strong Babies, featuring newly debuted K-pop groups Red Velvet, Winner, and Got7, where they performed Maroon 5's "Moves like Jagger". Lovelyz also performed their debut lead single "Candy Jelly Love".

=== 2015: Commercial success and first fanmeeting ===
Lovelyz released a repackage edition of Girls' Invasion titled Hi~ on March 3. It contains all nine tracks from the debut album, along with two new singles including the title track "Hi~". They made a comeback stage on March 5, performing "Hi~" and "Amusement Park" on music program M Countdown. On April 17, Lovelyz extended their promotion with another song from their repackaged album, "Amusement Park", on music programs. They continued the promotions until April 30. On April 22, Lovelyz participated in the KCON 2015 Japan M Countdown show for 15,000 attendees, their first overseas activity. On May 23, the group performed at the Dream Concert, which was held at the Seoul World Cup Stadium.

On August 27, Lovelyz performed at the Korea Brand and Entertainment Expo in Shanghai, along with labelmate Infinite. On the same day, Woollim Entertainment announced that Jisoo would be rejoining the group following the end of her scandal and revealed the title of their first extended play (EP), Lovelyz8, through the group's official Twitter page. A pre-release single titled "Shooting Star" was released on September 14. The EP was officially released on October 1, 2015. It contains seven tracks including the pre-release single "Shooting Star" and the lead single "Ah-Choo". The latter's music video was released on the same day, with a cameo appearance by Infinite's Hoya.

On October 31, Lovelyz was a guest on You Hee-yeol's Sketchbook where they performed an a cappella cover of Michael Jackson's song "Beat It". The performance gained attention online, and was broadcast on the American Fox News Channel. It was also written about by other foreign media. "Ah-Choo" had maintained its position on most major Korean music charts throughout 2015 and early-2016, making it Lovelyz's biggest hit. On November 26, Lovelyz received their first-ever award at the 23rd Korea Culture & Entertainment Awards for the "K-pop Top 10 Artists" category.

Lovelyz held their first fan-meeting and mini-concert, Lovely Day, on December 5 at Ax Korea. The tickets were sold out in the first five minutes after they went on sale. On December 7, Lovelyz released a three-track single album titled Lovelinus, named after their official fan club. They also released a music video for the album's lead single, "For You", on the same day.

=== 2016–2017: International breakthrough ===
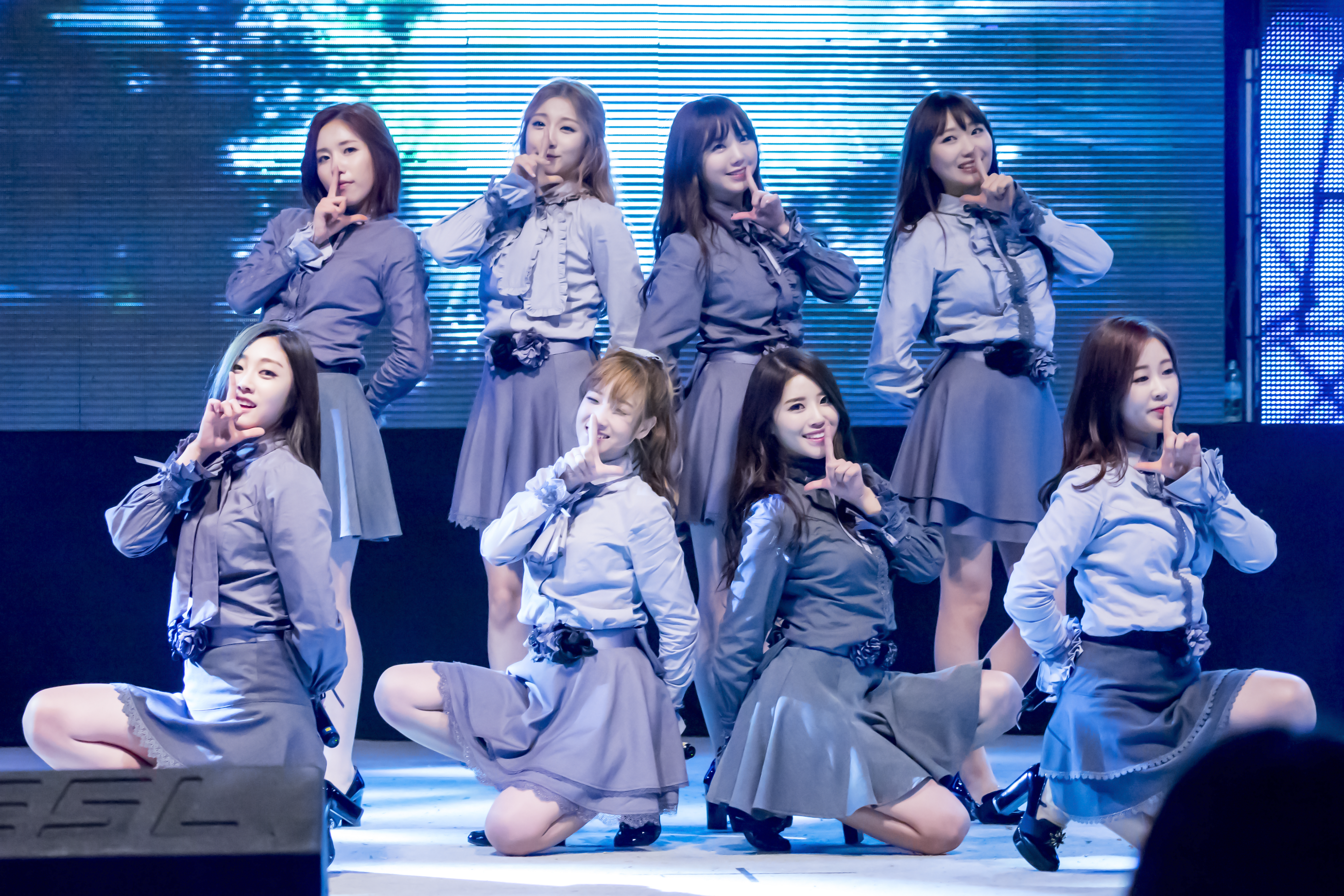
Lovelyz at Joongbu University Festival in May 2016

In January 2016, It was announced that the group's first reality show Lovelyz in Wonderland would begin airing February 2 on SBS MTV for eight episodes. Their song "Ah-Choo" continued to remain in digital Korean music charts, long after its release on September 14, 2015.

Lovelyz released their second EP, A New Trilogy on April 25, 2016, which contains seven tracks including the lead single titled "Destiny". The song debuted at number seven on the Gaon Digital Chart, making it their highest-charting song thus far. "Destiny" also received attention from American producer Brent Fischer who praised the lead single for its "world-class grooves and current arrangements".

In November 2016, Lovelyz announced their first solo concert titled Lovelyz in Winterland at the Blue Square Samsung Card Hall from January 13–15, 2017.

Woollim Entertainment announced that Lovelyz was set to release their second studio album R U Ready? on February 26, with "WoW!" as the lead single. However, in the early morning hours of February 27, the song was removed from Melon's real-time chart due to a technical glitch. Melon later admitted to the glitch and apologized. Woollim Entertainment revealed that Yein had injured her ankle during practice for comeback, and later confirmed that Yein would not be participating in the comeback due to her injury on March 2. Few weeks later, on March 23, Yein re-joined the promotions by performing at music program M Countdown for first time since recovering from the injury.

Their repackaged album titled Now, We was released on May 2, with the lead single of the same name. The album topped the Gaon Album Chart upon its release. They also won their first-ever music program win since debut on May 16, through SBS M's The Show.

Lovelyz held their second solo concert, Lovelyz 2017 Summer Concert [Alwayz], at Olympic Park, Olympic Hall on July 29 and 30. The tickets for the concert were sold-out within five minutes of its release.

On November 14, 2017, Lovelyz released their third EP, Fall in Lovelyz, with the lead single "Twinkle". The group promoted the song on various South Korean music programs, and received their first win for "Twinkle" on November 28 on The Show.

=== 2018–2019: Heal, Sanctuary and Once Upon A Time ===
Lovelyz held their third solo concert, Lovelyz in Winterland 2, at the Blue Square Samsung Card Hall from February 2–4, 2018. The concert was also held in Tokyo and Osaka on February 10 and February 12 respectively.

On April 10, Woollim Entertainment announced that Lovelyz would release their fourth EP titled Heal on April 23. The EP consists of six tracks, including the lead single "That Day", composed by Sweetune. Lovelyz held their comeback showcase at Blue Square iMarket Hall on the same day as the album's release, and was broadcast live through the Naver app V-Live. Lovelyz earned their first music show win for "That Day" on SBS MTV's The Show on May 1.

In June 2018, Lovelyz released their special digital single titled "Wag-Zak". Jin did not take part in the promotions due to health issues. Lovelyz performed "Wag-Zak" for the first time at Mnet's M Countdown on June 28, followed by promoting in the various music programs for a week. Their digital single "Wag-Zak", complemented by a music video, was officially released on July 1, which marked the group's first summer release.

Lovelyz released their first compilation album, Muse on Music, on September 11. The album contains the instrumental version of 33 tracks selected from their eight released records. It is also the first time a K-pop girl group released such album.

Lovelyz released their fifth EP, Sanctuary, with the lead single "Lost N Found", on November 26, 2018. In January 2019, they promoted the single "Rewind" as the follow-up single of the EP Sanctuary.

On May 20, 2019, they released their sixth EP Once Upon a Time with the lead single "When We Were Us (Beautiful Days)". In August 2019, the group joined the cast of the television program Queendom.

=== 2020–2021: Unforgettable and departure from Woollim Entertainment ===
Lovelyz released their seventh EP Unforgettable on September 1, 2020, along with the lead single "Obliviate". The group clinched their first win for "Obliviate" on the September 8 episode of SBS MTV's The Show.

On November 1, 2021, Woollim Entertainment announced 7 of the members, except Baby Soul, had decided not to renew their contracts, which expired on November 16. However, Woollim Entertainment didn't mention in its press release sent to news agencies on whether the group would be disbanded. Later, Baby Soul confirmed that although the members are signed under different agencies, they still have desire to promote and release albums together as Lovelyz in the near future.

=== 2022–2025: Hiatus and group reunion ===
After leaving Woollim Entertainment in November 2021, the group went on hiatus to focus on individual activities with each of the members under different management. On November 17, 2022, Lovelyz was scheduled to appear on Naver Now's Music To You and meet fans, but the schedule was changed to November 23.

The group, except Jin, appeared together on March 30, 2024's episode of Hangout with Yoo. The group performed on Hangout with Yoo - Our Festival on June 13 the same year. On September 2, the group announced their solo concert Lovelyz in Winterland 4 to be held in November 2024, in commemoration of the group's 10th anniversary, and their first concert in four years. The group released a new digital single titled "November" on November 12, their first release in 4 years and 2 months. The group released another digital single titled "Dear" on November 23.

On December 19, 2025, the group performed together at 2025 KBS Song Festival for the first time in 11 years.

== Philanthropy ==
In August 2016, members of Lovelyz were appointed by the Ministry of National Defense to become anti-smoking ambassadors for the South Korean military. The arrangement was part of the "Anti-Smoking Soldiers Program" which was announced on May 31.

== Members ==
Adapted from the official website:

- Baby Soul (베이비소울) – leader, vocalist
- Yoo Ji-ae (유지애) – vocalist
- Seo Ji-soo (서지수) – vocalist, dancer
- Lee Mi-joo (이미주) – vocalist, dancer
- Kei (케이) – vocalist
- Jin (진) – vocalist
- Ryu Su-jeong (류수정) – vocalist
- Jeong Ye-in (정예인) – vocalist

== Discography ==
- Girls' Invasion (2014)
- R U Ready? (2017)

== Concerts ==
=== Headlining ===
- Lovelyz in Winterland (2017)
- Lovelyz 2017 Summer Concert [Alwayz] (2017)
- Lovelyz in Winterland 2 (2018)
- Lovelyz in Winterland 3 (2019)
- Lovelyz 2019 Summer Concert [Alwayz 2] (2019)
- Lovelyz in Winterland 4 (2024–2025)

== Filmography ==
=== Reality series ===
Year	Title	Notes
2016	Lovelyz in Wonderland (이상한나라의 러블리즈)	Lovelyz's first variety show
2017	Lovelyz Loves Canada	Web reality show
2017	Lovelyz in Parallel Universe	Lovelyz Diary series
2017	Lovelyz's 'Tell Me Your Wish'	
2018	The Man Who Feeds The Dog 2	
2019	Queendom	
