= Woollim Entertainment =

South Korean entertainment company

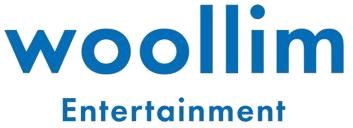
- Native name: 울림 엔터테인먼트; Woollim 엔터테인먼트
- Industry: Entertainment
- Genre: K-pop; Dance; R&B; Electropop; Rock
- Founded: October 1, 2003; 23 years ago
- Founder: Lee Jung-yeop
- Headquarters: Seongsan-dong, Mapo-gu, Seoul, South Korea
- Key people: Lee Jung-yeop (CEO)
- Services: Music Production; Licensing; Artists Management
- Revenue: ₩11,739,000,000 (2012)
- Net income: ₩1,974,000,000 (2012)
- Total assets: ₩5,128,000,000 (2012)
- Owners: Shareholder structure; Woollim Holdings (67.10%); Lee Jung-yeop (25%); Others (5.65%)
- Parent: SM Entertainment (2013–2025)
- Website: www.woolliment.com

Woollim Entertainment (Korean: 울림 엔터테인먼트; RR: Ullim Enteoteinmeonteu) is a South Korean entertainment company founded in 2003 by Lee Jung-yeop.

The label is home to artists such as Golden Child and Drippin. It has previously handled artists Epik High, Infinite, Lovelyz, Nell, Rocket Punch, and Kwon Eun-bi and actor Kim Min-seok.

== History ==
In June 2010, Woollim debuted their first ever boy group, Infinite.

In August 2013, Woollim Entertainment merged with SM Entertainment's subsidiary SM Culture & Contents (SM C&C) to form "Woollim Label", an independent record label whose music would be different from SM Entertainment's sounds with their own color of music and an eclectic lineup of artists.

In November 2014, Woollim debuted their first girl group, Lovelyz.

On March 21, 2016, SM C&C announced that it decided to separate its video content business from its music content business. SM C&C established Woollim Entertainment (Woollim Entertainment Co., Ltd) to handle its music content business, with SM C&C owning all stocks of the company. The partition came into effect on June 8, 2016.

In August 2017, Woollim debuted their second boy group after seven years, Golden Child.

In August 2019, Woollim debuted their second girl group, Rocket Punch. In October 2020, Woollim debuted their third boy group, Drippin.

In late-April 2021, Following the disbandment of Produce 48 group Iz*One, Woollim then-trainees Kwon Eun-bi and Kim Chae-won returned to the company. In September 2021, Kim Chae-won left the company.

On November 1, 2021, Woollim Entertainment announced 7 members of Lovelyz contract expired on November 16 and only Baby Soul, now using her real name Lee Su-jeong, has re-signed with the company, while the remaining members did not re-sign.

On August 24, 2024, Golden Child would be re-organized as a 7-member group, as members Tag, Kim Ji-beom and Choi Bo-min departed from the group did not renew their contract and also confirmed that 5-member of the group had renewed their contract, expect Lee Dae-yeol and Y due both of them renewal contract period has not yet arrived. In December 2024, it was later announced that remaining member of Golden Child terminated their contract, except Lee Jang-jun and Hong Joo-chan. In the same months, Woollim also announced that Rocket Punch had ended their activities after 4 member of the group terminated their contract, with leaving only Suyun remains with the company.

== Artists ==
=== Groups ===
- Golden Child
- Drippin

=== Soloists ===
- Lee Jang-jun

== Former artists ==
- Epik High (2003–2008, 2009–2011)
- Kim Dong-ryul
- Lee Jin-young
- Kang Kyun-sung
- Kwak Jung-wook
- Tasty (2012–2015)
- Nell (2006–2016)
- Infinite (2010–2022)
  - Hoya (2010–2017)
  - L (2010–2019)
  - Sungkyu (2010–2021)
  - Dongwoo (2010–2021)
  - Sungyeol (2010–2021)
  - Sungjong (2010–2022)
  - Woohyun (2010–2022)
- Kim Min-seok
- Golden Child
  - Park Jae-seok (2017–2018)
  - Choi Bomin (2017–2024)
  - Kim Jibeom (2017–2024)
  - Son Young-Taek (TAG) (2017–2024)
  - Lee Dae-yeol (2017–2024)
  - Y (2017–2024)
  - Bae Seung-min (2017–2024)
  - Bong Jae-hyun (2017–2024)
  - Kim Dong-hyun (2017–2024)
  - Hong Joo-chan (2017-2026)
- Oh Hyun-min
- Joo (2015–2020)
- Lovelyz (2014–2021, 2024–2025)
  - Jiae (2014–2021)
  - Jisoo (2014–2021)
  - Mijoo (2014–2021)
  - Kei (2014–2021)
  - Jin (2014–2021)
  - Sujeong (2014–2021)
  - Yein (2014–2021)
  - Baby Soul (2011–2025)
- Kim Chaewon (2018–2021)
- Drippin
  - Alex (2020–2023)
- Rocket Punch (2019–2024)
  - Juri (2019–2024)
  - Yeonhee (2019–2024)
  - Yunkyoung (2019–2024)
  - Sohee (2019–2024)
  - Dahyun (2019–2024)
  - Suyun (2019–2026)
- Kwon Eun-bi (2018–2026)
