= Red Velvet discography =

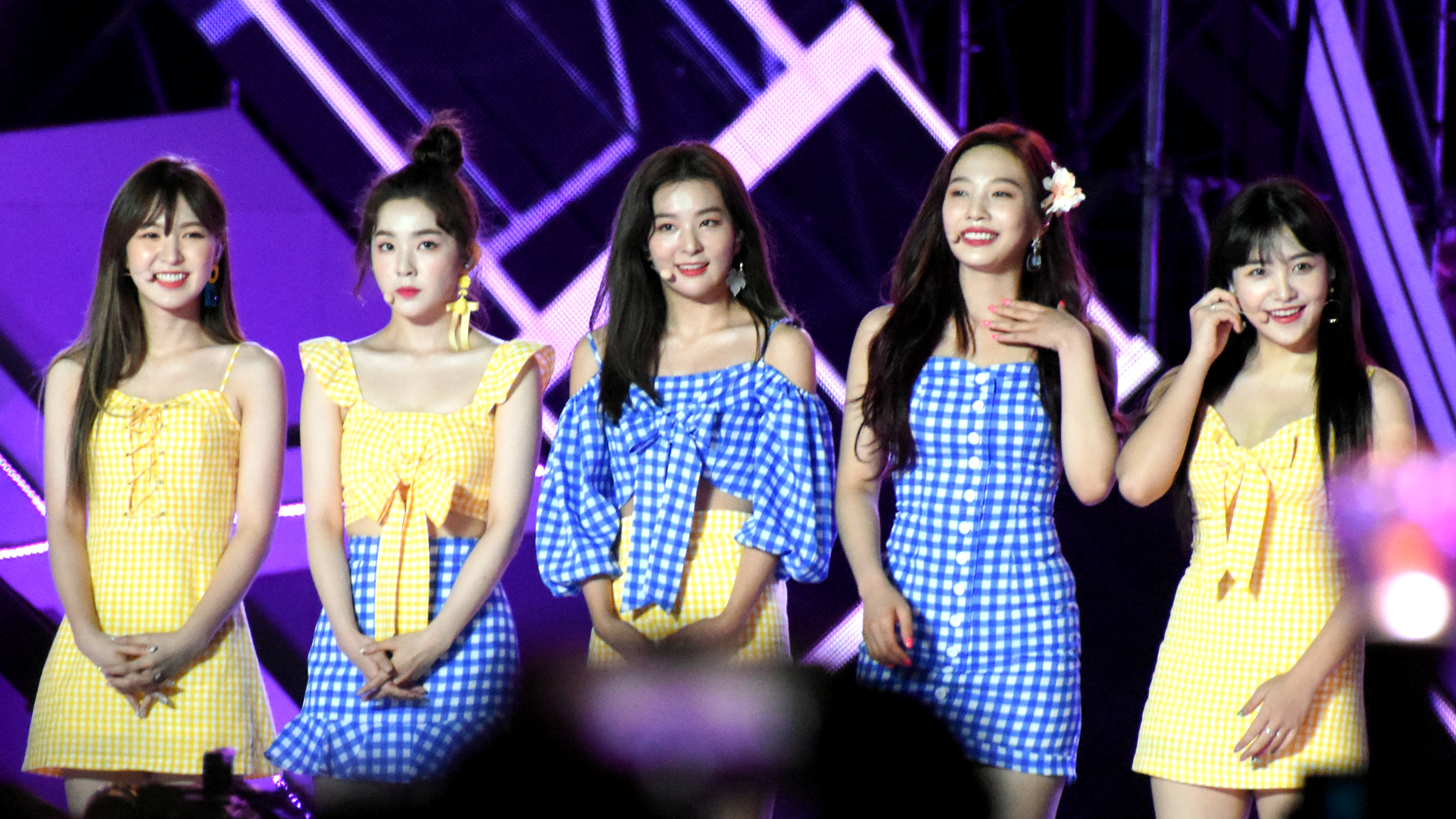
- Red Velvet at the 2018 Incheon Airport Festival
- Studio albums: 4
- Reissue studio albums: 1
- Compilation albums: 1
- EPs: 16
- Singles: 32
- Promotional singles: 1
- Soundtrack appearances: 7

The discography of the South Korean girl group Red Velvet consists of four studio albums, one reissue studio album, one compilation album, sixteen extended plays, thirty-two singles, one promotional single and seven soundtrack appearances.

Red Velvet was formed by the South Korean entertainment company SM Entertainment in 2014, and initially consisted of four members; Irene, Seulgi, Wendy and Joy. The group debuted in August 2014 with the release of their single "Happiness". In March 2015, Yeri joined the group, and their first EP and first studio album, Ice Cream Cake and The Red were released. In 2016 saw the release of their EPs, The Velvet and Russian Roulette.

In February 2017, their fourth EP, Rookie was released. The group released a "special summer" EP The Red Summer in July 2017. Their second studio album, Perfect Velvet was released in November 2017, with the lead single, "Peek-a-Boo". The album debuted at number-one at the Billboard World Albums chart, which marked their fourth number-one album on the chart, making them the K-pop girl group with the most number-one albums on the chart. A repackage of the album titled The Perfect Red Velvet was released in January 2018.

In 2018, their debut Japanese EP, #Cookie Jar was released along with EPs, Summer Magic and RBB. In 2019, their second Japanese EP Sappy was released. It was followed by The ReVe Festival trilogy with the releases of "Zimzalabim" from The ReVe Festival: Day 1, "Umpah Umpah" from The ReVe Festival: Day 2 and "Psycho" from the compilation album The ReVe Festival: Finale. In 2021, the EP Queendom and the lead single of the same name was released. In 2022 saw the release of The ReVe Festival 2022 – Feel My Rhythm, the Japanese studio album Bloom and The ReVe Festival 2022 – Birthday. In 2023, the group released their third Korean studio album Chill Kill. In 2024, the EP Cosmic was released. In 2026, the group released the EP, Velvet Summer.

To date, Red Velvet have earned thirteen number-one albums and two number-one singles in South Korea.

== Studio albums ==
=== Korean studio albums ===
List of Red Velvet Korean studio albums
Title	Details	Peak chart positions								Sales	Certifications
Title	Details	KOR	AUS Hit.	FRA Dig.	JPN	JPN Hot	UK Down	US Heat.	US World	Sales	Certifications
The Red	Released: September 9, 2015; Label: SM Entertainment; Formats: CD, digital download, streaming	1	—	—	47	—	—	24	1	KOR: 109,573; JPN: 4,478; US: 3,000	
Perfect Velvet	Released: November 17, 2017; Label: SM Entertainment; Formats: CD, digital download, streaming	2	—	95	20	52	86	3	1	KOR: 157,198; JPN: 12,799 (Note: The sales of Perfect Velvet and The Perfect Red Velvet are combined in Oricon.); US: 3,000	
Chill Kill	Released: November 13, 2023; Label: SM Entertainment; Formats: CD, digital download, streaming	1	10	—	12	10	33	14	11	KOR: 611,531; JPN: 9,934	KMCA: 2× Platinum
"—" denotes releases that did not chart or were not released in that region.

=== Japanese studio albums ===
List of Red Velvet Japanese studio albums
Title	Details	Peak chart positions		Sales
Title	Details	JPN	JPN Hot	Sales
Bloom	Released: April 6, 2022; Label: Avex Trax; Formats: CD, DVD, digital download, streaming	5	2	JPN: 17,811 (physical)

=== Reissue studio albums ===
List of reissue studio albums
Title	Details	Peak chart positions						Sales
Title	Details	KOR	FRA Dig.	JPN	JPN Hot	US Heat.	US World	Sales
The Perfect Red Velvet	Released: January 29, 2018; Label: SM Entertainment; Formats: CD, digital download, streaming, SMC	1	87	29	49	7	3	KOR: 194,402; JPN: 12,799

== Compilation albums ==
List of compilation albums
Title	Details	Peak chart positions					Sales	Certifications
Title	Details	KOR	JPN	JPN Hot	US Heat.	US World	Sales	Certifications
The ReVe Festival: Finale	Released: December 23, 2019; Label: SM Entertainment; Formats: CD, digital download, streaming	1	24	45	2	3	KOR: 406,282; JPN: 8,032	KMCA: Platinum

== Extended plays ==
=== Korean extended plays ===
List of Korean extended plays
Title	Details	Peak chart positions									Sales	Certifications (Note: In April 2018, Gaon Music Chart introduced music recording certifications for albums, downloads, and streamings that were released and licensed in Korea starting from January 2018 onward.)
Title	Details	KOR	AUS Dig.	BEL (FL)	JPN	JPN Hot	UK Down.	US	US Heat.	US World	Sales	Certifications
Ice Cream Cake	Released: March 18, 2015; Label: SM Entertainment; Formats: CD, digital download, streaming	1	—	—	76	—	—	—	24	2	KOR: 122,102; JPN: 2,796; US: 3,000	
The Velvet	Released: March 17, 2016; Label: SM Entertainment; Formats: CD, digital download, streaming	1	—	—	75	—	—	—	—	8	KOR: 80,334; JPN: 2,104	
Russian Roulette	Released: September 7, 2016; Label: SM Entertainment; Formats: CD, digital download, streaming	1	—	—	40	—	—	—	18	2	KOR: 123,698; JPN: 3,446; US: 2,000	
Rookie	Released: February 1, 2017; Label: SM Entertainment; Formats: CD, digital download, streaming, SMC	1	—	—	43	—	—	—	21	1	KOR: 159,516; JPN: 4,351	
The Red Summer	Released: July 10, 2017; Label: SM Entertainment; Formats: CD, digital download, streaming, SMC	1	—	—	27	—	—	—	8	1	KOR: 155,289; JPN: 4,659; US: 2,000	
Summer Magic	Released: August 6, 2018; Label: SM Entertainment; Formats: CD, digital download, streaming	1	31	—	12	24	38	—	3	3	KOR: 233,899; JPN: 8,950; US: 2,000	
RBB	Released: November 30, 2018; Label: SM Entertainment; Formats: CD, digital download, streaming	3	—	—	33	51	60	—	1	2	KOR: 152,403; JPN: 5,411; US: 10,000	
The ReVe Festival: Day 1	Released: June 19, 2019; Label: SM Entertainment; Formats: CD, digital download, streaming, SMC	1	—	—	20	46	68	—	5	7	KOR: 279,282; JPN: 4,855	KMCA: Platinum
The ReVe Festival: Day 2	Released: August 20, 2019; Label: SM Entertainment; Formats: CD, digital download, streaming, SMC	1	—	—	17	54	51	—	11	6	KOR: 239,342; JPN: 4,387; US: 1,000	
Queendom	Released: August 16, 2021; Label: SM Entertainment; Formats: CD, digital download, streaming	2	17	143	11	23	17	—	16	11	KOR: 396,587; JPN: 12,577	KMCA: Platinum
The ReVe Festival 2022 – Feel My Rhythm	Released: March 21, 2022; Label: SM Entertainment; Formats: CD, digital download, streaming	1	10	138	6	4	26	—	9	8	KOR: 702,482; JPN: 10,488	KMCA: 2× Platinum
The ReVe Festival 2022 – Birthday	Released: November 28, 2022; Label: SM Entertainment; Formats: CD, digital download, streaming, SMC	2	—	—	16	11	—	—	—	—	KOR: 1,048,239; JPN: 10,095	KMCA: 3× Platinum
Cosmic	Released: June 24, 2024; Label: SM Entertainment; Formats: CD, digital download, streaming	3	—	—	15	13	40	145	1	4	KOR: 314,348; JPN: 6,530	
Velvet Summer	Released: August 3, 2026; Label: SM Entertainment; Formats: CD, digital download, streaming	4	—	—	27	62	—	—	—	—	KOR: 151,838; JPN: 1,442	
"—" denotes releases that did not chart or were not released in that region.

=== Japanese extended plays ===
List of Japanese extended plays
Title	Details	Peak chart positions			Sales
Title	Details	JPN	JPN Hot	US World	Sales
#Cookie Jar	Released: July 4, 2018; Label: Avex Trax, SM Entertainment Japan; Formats: CD, digital download, streaming	3	4	13	JPN: 31,638
Sappy	Released: May 29, 2019; Label: Avex Trax, SM Entertainment Japan; Formats: CD, DVD, digital download, streaming	4	4	—	JPN: 17,236
"—" denotes releases that did not chart or were not released in that region.

== Singles ==
=== Korean singles ===
List of Red Velvet Korean singles
Title	Year	Peak chart positions								Sales	Certifications	Album
Title	Year	KOR	KOR Billb. (Note: Includes the Billboard K-pop Hot 100 (defunct as of 2022), and South Korea Songs (part of Billboard's Hits of the World (2022 onwards)).)	CAN	JPN Hot	NZ Hot	SGP	US World	WW	Sales	Certifications	Album
"Happiness" (행복)	2014	5	—	—	—	—	—	4	—	KOR: 433,336; US: 15,000		Non-album singles
"Be Natural" (featuring Taeyong)	2014	33	—	—	—	—	—	6	—	KOR: 70,920		Non-album singles
"Automatic"	2015	32	—	—	—	—	—	9	—	KOR: 80,662		Ice Cream Cake
"Ice Cream Cake"	2015	4	—	—	—	—	—	3	—	KOR: 1,378,831; US: 23,000		Ice Cream Cake
"Dumb Dumb"	2015	2	—	—	—	—	—	3	—	KOR: 1,611,205; US: 26,000		The Red
"Wish Tree" (세가지 소원)	2015	33	—	—	—	—	—	—	—	KOR: 128,382		Winter Garden
"One of These Nights" (7월 7일)	2016	10	—	—	—	—	—	6	—	KOR: 365,450		The Velvet
"Russian Roulette" (러시안 룰렛)	2016	2	70	—	—	—	—	2	—	KOR: 2,500,000; US: 24,000	RMNZ: Gold	Russian Roulette
"Rookie"	2017	3	39	—	—	—	—	4	—	KOR: 1,358,020		Rookie
"Would U"	2017	13	—	—	—	—	—	—	—	KOR: 188,236		Non-album single
"Red Flavor" (빨간 맛)	2017	1	2	—	25	—	—	4	—	KOR: 2,500,000		The Red Summer
"Rebirth" (환생)	2017	78	—	—	—	—	—	25	—	KOR: 51,816		Non-album single
"Peek-a-Boo" (피카부)	2017	2	2	—	36	—	—	2	—	KOR: 2,500,000; US: 21,000		Perfect Velvet
"Bad Boy"	2018	2	2	87	49	—	8	2	—	KOR: 2,500,000; US: 27,000	KMCA: Platinum (Note: Certification for downloads); RMNZ: Gold	The Perfect Red Velvet
"Power Up"	2018	1	1	—	— (Note: "Power Up" did not enter the Billboard Japan Hot 100 but peaked at number 88 on both the component Top Download Songs chart and Top Streaming Songs chart.)	—	— (Note: "Power Up" did not enter the RIAS Top Streaming Chart but peaked at number 16 on the component Top Regional Chart.)	6	—	KOR: 2,500,000; US: 1,000	KMCA: Platinum	Summer Magic
"RBB (Really Bad Boy)"	2018	10	7	—	93	—	14	1	—	US: 2,000		RBB
"Close to Me" (Red Velvet remix) (with Ellie Goulding and Diplo)	2019	—	—	—	—	—	—	—	—			Brightest Blue
"Zimzalabim" (짐살라빔)	2019	11	4	—	—	39	—	10	—			The ReVe Festival: Day 1
"Umpah Umpah" (음파음파)	2019	18	1	—	—	—	—	9	—			The ReVe Festival: Day 2
"Psycho"	2019	2	2	—	— (Note: "Psycho" did not enter the Billboard Japan Hot 100 but peaked at number 41 on the component Top Streaming Songs chart.)	10	1	1	—	US: 2,000	KMCA: Platinum (Note: Certification for streaming); RMNZ: Gold	The ReVe Festival: Finale
"Queendom"	2021	5	7	—	77	—	12	10	96			Queendom
"Feel My Rhythm"	2022	3	3	—	47	24	9	8	36		KMCA: Platinum	The ReVe Festival 2022 – Feel My Rhythm
"Birthday"	2022	23	14	—	—	—	—	—	—			The ReVe Festival 2022 – Birthday
"Beautiful Christmas" (with Aespa)	2022	113	—	—	—	—	—	—	—			2022 Winter SM Town: SMCU Palace
"Chill Kill"	2023	11	—	—	—	—	— (Note: "Chill Kill" did not enter the RIAS Top Streaming Chart; it peaked at number 23 on the Top Regional Chart.)	—	— (Note: "Chill Kill" did not enter the Billboard Global 200; it peaked at number 193 on the Billboard Global Excl. U.S. chart.)			Chill Kill
"Cosmic"	2024	29	—	—	—	36	— (Note: "Cosmic" did not enter the RIAS Top Streaming Chart; it peaked at number 28 on the Top Regional Chart.)	—	— (Note: "Cosmic" did not enter the Billboard Global 200; it peaked at number 136 on the Billboard Global Excl. U.S. chart.)			Cosmic
"Sweet Dreams"	2024	— (Note: "Sweet Dreams" did not enter the Circle Digital Chart; it peaked at number 15 on the Circle Download Chart.)	—	—	—	—	—	—	—			Cosmic
"Surfin' Boy"	2026	17	—	—	—	—	—	—	—			Velvet Summer
"—" denotes releases that did not chart or were not released in that region.

=== Japanese singles ===
List of Red Velvet Japanese singles
Title	Year	Peak chart positions		Album
Title	Year	KOR Intl.	US World	Album
"#Cookie Jar"	2018	93	20	#Cookie Jar
"Sappy"	2019	—	13	Sappy
"Sayonara"	2019	—	—	Sappy
"Wildside"	2022	—	9	Bloom
"—" denotes releases that did not chart or were not released in that region.

=== Promotional singles ===
List of promotional singles
Title	Year	Peak chart positions		Album
Title	Year	KOR	KOR Hot	Album
"Milky Way"	2020	119	64	Non-album single

== Soundtrack appearances ==
List of soundtrack appearances, showing year released, selected chart positions, and originating album
Title	Year	Peak chart positions			Album
Title	Year	KOR	KOR Hot	US World	Album
"Goodbye" (안녕) (Note: Credited as Red Velvet but only features Seulgi, Wendy, and Joy.)	2015	—	—	—	Immortal Songs: Singing the Legend
"To Get What Your Heart Wants" (너에게 원한건)	2016	—	—	—	Two Yoo Project Sugar Man
"Yossism" (여시주의)	2016	—	—	—	Telemonster
"I Will Leave" (떠날 거야)	2018	— (Note: "I Will Leave" did not enter the Gaon Digital Chart but debuted at number 47 on the component BGM Chart.)	—	—	Two Yoo Project Sugar Man
"See the Stars" (어떤 별보다)	2019	50	50	—	Hotel del Luna
"Just Sing (Trolls World Tour)" (with various artists)	2020	—	—	—	Trolls World Tour
"Future" (미래)	2020	180	95	21	Start-Up
"—" denotes a recording that did not chart or was not released in that territory

== Other charted songs ==
List of other charted songs, showing year released, selected chart positions, download sales figures, and originating album
Title	Year	Peak chart positions			Sales	Album
Title	Year	KOR	KOR Hot	US World	Sales	Album
"Somethin Kinda Crazy"	2015	52	—	—	KOR: 51,549	Ice Cream Cake
"Stupid Cupid"	2015	74	—	—	KOR: 39,575	Ice Cream Cake
"Take It Slow"	2015	64	—	—	KOR: 44,026	Ice Cream Cake
"Candy" (사탕)	2015	66	—	—	KOR: 43,693	Ice Cream Cake
"Huff n Puff"	2015	36	—	—	KOR: 100,944	The Red
"Campfire"	2015	68	—	—	KOR: 51,577	The Red
"Red Dress"	2015	78	—	—	KOR: 44,339	The Red
"Oh Boy"	2015	35	—	—	KOR: 108,422	The Red
"Lady's Room"	2015	83	—	—	KOR: 46,356	The Red
"Time Slip"	2015	88	—	—	KOR: 45,627	The Red
"Don't U Wait No More"	2015	69	—	—	KOR: 52,691	The Red
"Day 1"	2015	74	—	—	KOR: 52,264	The Red
"Cool World"	2015	95	—	—	KOR: 40,474	The Red
"Cool Hot Sweet Love"	2016	48	—	23	KOR: 72,559	The Velvet
"Light Me Up"	2016	79	—	—	KOR: 48,893	The Velvet
"First Time" (처음인가요)	2016	70	—	—	KOR: 54,292	The Velvet
"Rose Scent Breeze" (장미꽃 향기는 바람에 날리고)	2016	61	—	—	KOR: 57,394	The Velvet
"Lucky Girl"	2016	42	—	—	KOR: 90,351	Russian Roulette
"Bad Dracula"	2016	81	—	—	KOR: 44,648	Russian Roulette
"Sunny Afternoon"	2016	78	—	—	KOR: 46,813	Russian Roulette
"Fool"	2016	84	—	—	KOR: 42,507	Russian Roulette
"Some Love"	2016	100	—	—	KOR: 41,246	Russian Roulette
"My Dear"	2016	89	—	—	KOR: 48,708	Russian Roulette
"Little Little"	2017	41	—	—	KOR: 75,539	Rookie
"Happily Ever After"	2017	71	—	—	KOR: 32,198	Rookie
"Talk to Me"	2017	67	—	—	KOR: 35,861	Rookie
"Body Talk"	2017	79	—	—	KOR: 28,698	Rookie
"Last Love" (마지막 사랑)	2017	72	—	—	KOR: 32,656	Rookie
"You Better Know"	2017	14	21	—	KOR: 118,309	The Red Summer
"Zoo"	2017	24	30	—	KOR: 82,388	The Red Summer
"Mojito" (여름빛)	2017	32	69	—	KOR: 55,235	The Red Summer
"Hear the Sea" (바다가 들려)	2017	35	70	—	KOR: 52,988	The Red Summer
"Look" (봐)	2017	74	61	—	KOR: 49,319	Perfect Velvet
"I Just"	2017	— (Note: "I Just" did not enter the Gaon Digital Chart; it debuted at number 60 on the component Download Chart.)	—	—	KOR: 23,094	Perfect Velvet
"Kingdom Come"	2017	— (Note: "Kingdom Come" did not enter the Gaon Digital Chart; it debuted at number 52 on the component Download Chart.)	65	—	KOR: 38,855	Perfect Velvet
"My Second Date" (두 번째 데이트)	2017	— (Note: "My Second Date" did not enter the Gaon Digital Chart; it debuted at number 54 on the component Download Chart.)	67	—	KOR: 37,984	Perfect Velvet
"Attaboy"	2017	— (Note: "Attaboy" did not enter the Gaon Digital Chart; it debuted at number 74 on the component Download Chart.)	—	—	KOR: 20,307	Perfect Velvet
"Perfect 10"	2017	— (Note: "Perfect 10" did not enter the Gaon Digital Chart; it debuted at number 71 on the component Download Chart.)	—	—	KOR: 20,491	Perfect Velvet
"About Love"	2017	— (Note: "About Love" did not enter the Gaon Digital Chart; it debuted at number 58 on the component Download Chart.)	—	—	KOR: 23,172	Perfect Velvet
"Moonlight Melody" (달빛 소리)	2017	98	64	—	KOR: 35,962	Perfect Velvet
"All Right"	2018	79	41	—	—N/a	The Perfect Red Velvet
"Time to Love"	2018	— (Note: "Time to Love" did not enter the Gaon Digital Chart; it debuted at number 57 on the component Download Chart.)	—	—	—N/a	The Perfect Red Velvet
"With You" (한 여름의 크리스마스)	2018	34	18	—	—N/a	Summer Magic
"Mr. E"	2018	80	26	—	—N/a	Summer Magic
"Mosquito"	2018	88	29	—	—N/a	Summer Magic
"Hit That Drum"	2018	83	27	—	—N/a	Summer Magic
"Blue Lemonade"	2018	68	23	—	—N/a	Summer Magic
"Bad Boy" (English version)	2018	— (Note: "Bad Boy" (English version) did not enter the Gaon Digital Chart; it debuted at number 35 on the component Download Chart.)	—	—	—N/a	Summer Magic
"Butterflies"	2018	— (Note: "Butterflies" did not enter the Gaon Digital Chart; it debuted at number 67 on the component Download Chart.)	—	—	—N/a	RBB
"So Good"	2018	— (Note: "So Good" did not enter the Gaon Digital Chart; it debuted at number 91 on the component Download Chart.)	—	—	—N/a	RBB
"Sunny Side Up! "	2019	123	—	—	—N/a	The ReVe Festival: Day 1
"Milkshake"	2019	181	—	—	—N/a	The ReVe Festival: Day 1
"Bing Bing" (친구가 아냐)	2019	— (Note: "Bing Bing" did not enter the Gaon Digital Chart; it debuted at number 75 on the component Download Chart.)	—	—	—N/a	The ReVe Festival: Day 1
"Parade" (안녕, 여름)	2019	184	—	—	—N/a	The ReVe Festival: Day 1
"LP"	2019	— (Note: "LP" did not enter the Gaon Digital Chart; it debuted at number 71 on the component Download Chart.)	—	—	—N/a	The ReVe Festival: Day 1
"Carpool" (카풀)	2019	169	—	—	—N/a	The ReVe Festival: Day 2
"Love Is the Way"	2019	199	—	—	—N/a	The ReVe Festival: Day 2
"Jumpin'"	2019	— (Note: "Jumpin'" did not enter the Gaon Digital Chart; it debuted at number 110 on the component Download Chart.)	—	—	—N/a	The ReVe Festival: Day 2
"Ladies Night"	2019	— (Note: "Ladies Night" did not enter the Gaon Digital Chart; it debuted at number 82 on the component Download Chart.)	—	–	—N/a	The ReVe Festival: Day 2
"Eyes Locked, Hands Locked" (눈 맞추고, 손 맞대고)	2019	— (Note: "Eyes Locked, Hands Locked" did not enter the Gaon Digital Chart; it debuted at number 113 on the component Download Chart.)	—	—	—N/a	The ReVe Festival: Day 2
"In & Out"	2019	88	50	—	—N/a	The ReVe Festival: Finale
"Remember Forever"	2019	128	65	—	—N/a	The ReVe Festival: Finale
"La Rouge" (Special Track)	2019	— (Note: "La Rouge" (Special Track) did not enter the Gaon Digital Chart; it debuted at number 79 on the component Download Chart.)	—	—	—N/a	The ReVe Festival: Finale
"Pose"	2021	105	81	—	—N/a	Queendom
"Knock on Wood"	2021	112	—	—	—N/a	Queendom
"Hello, Sunset" (다시 여름)	2021	137	—	—	—N/a	Queendom
"Better Be"	2021	138	—	—	—N/a	Queendom
"Pushin' N Pullin'"	2021	139	—	—	—N/a	Queendom
"Queendom" (Demicat Remix)	2021	— (Note: "Queendom" (Demicat Remix) did not enter the Gaon Digital Chart; it peaked at number 100 on the component Download Chart.)	—	—	—N/a	Non-album song
"Bad Boy" (PREP Remix)	2021	— (Note: "Bad Boy" (PREP Remix) did not enter the Gaon Digital Chart; it peaked at number 98 on the component Download Chart.)	—	—	—N/a	iScreaM Vol. 12 : Bad Boy Remixes
"Rainbow Halo"	2022	119	100	—	—N/a	The ReVe Festival 2022 – Feel My Rhythm
"Beg for Me"	2022	138	—	—	—N/a	The ReVe Festival 2022 – Feel My Rhythm
"Bamboleo"	2022	124	—	—	—N/a	The ReVe Festival 2022 – Feel My Rhythm
"Good, Bad, Ugly"	2022	177	—	—	—N/a	The ReVe Festival 2022 – Feel My Rhythm
"In My Dreams"	2022	129	—	—	—N/a	The ReVe Festival 2022 – Feel My Rhythm
"Bye Bye"	2022	155	—	—	—N/a	The ReVe Festival 2022 – Birthday
"On a Ride" (롤러코스터)	2022	120	—	—	—N/a	The ReVe Festival 2022 – Birthday
"Zoom"	2022	161	—	—	—N/a	The ReVe Festival 2022 – Birthday
"Celebrate"	2022	189	—	—	—N/a	The ReVe Festival 2022 – Birthday
"Knock Knock (Who's There?)"	2023	127	—	—	—N/a	Chill Kill
"Underwater"	2023	— (Note: "Underwater" did not enter the Circle Digital Chart; it peaked at number 36 on the component Download Chart.)	—	—	—N/a	Chill Kill
"Will I Ever See You Again?"	2023	— (Note: "Will I Ever See You Again?" did not enter the Circle Digital Chart; it peaked at number 28 on the component Download Chart.)	—	—	—N/a	Chill Kill
"Nightmare"	2023	— (Note: "Nightmare" did not enter the Circle Digital Chart; it peaked at number 30 on the component Download Chart.)	—	—	—N/a	Chill Kill
"Iced Coffee"	2023	— (Note: "Nightmare" did not enter the Circle Digital Chart; it peaked at number 39 on the component Download Chart.)	—	—	—N/a	Chill Kill
"One Kiss"	2023	— (Note: "One Kiss" did not enter the Circle Digital Chart; it peaked at number 29 on the component Download Chart.)	—	—	—N/a	Chill Kill
"Bulldozer"	2023	— (Note: "Bulldozer" did not enter the Circle Digital Chart; it peaked at number 37 on the component Download Chart.)	—	—	—N/a	Chill Kill
"Wings"	2023	— (Note: "Wings" did not enter the Circle Digital Chart; it peaked at number 43 on the component Download Chart.)	—	—	—N/a	Chill Kill
"Scenery" (풍경화)	2023	— (Note: "Scenery" did not enter the Circle Digital Chart; it peaked at number 40 on the component Download Chart.)	—	—	—N/a	Chill Kill
"Sunflower"	2024	157	—	—	—N/a	Cosmic
"Last Drop"	2024	— (Note: "Last Drop" did not enter the Circle Digital Chart; it peaked at number 33 on the component Download Chart.)	—	—	—N/a	Cosmic
"Love Arcade"	2024	— (Note: "Love Arcade" did not enter the Circle Digital Chart; it peaked at number 35 on the component Download Chart.)	—	—	—N/a	Cosmic
"Bubble"	2024	— (Note: "Bubble" did not enter the Circle Digital Chart; it peaked at number 37 on the component Download Chart.)	—	—	—N/a	Cosmic
"Night Drive"	2024	— (Note: "Night Drive" did not enter the Circle Digital Chart; it peaked at number 39 on the component Download Chart.)	—	—	—N/a	Cosmic
"Run Devil Run"	2025	— (Note: "Run Devil Run" did not enter the Circle Digital Chart; it peaked at number 112 on the component Download Chart.)	—	—	—N/a	2025 SM Town: The Culture, the Future
"—" denotes releases that did not chart or were not released in that region.
