= List of awards and nominations received by Red Velvet =

Red Velvet awards and nominations
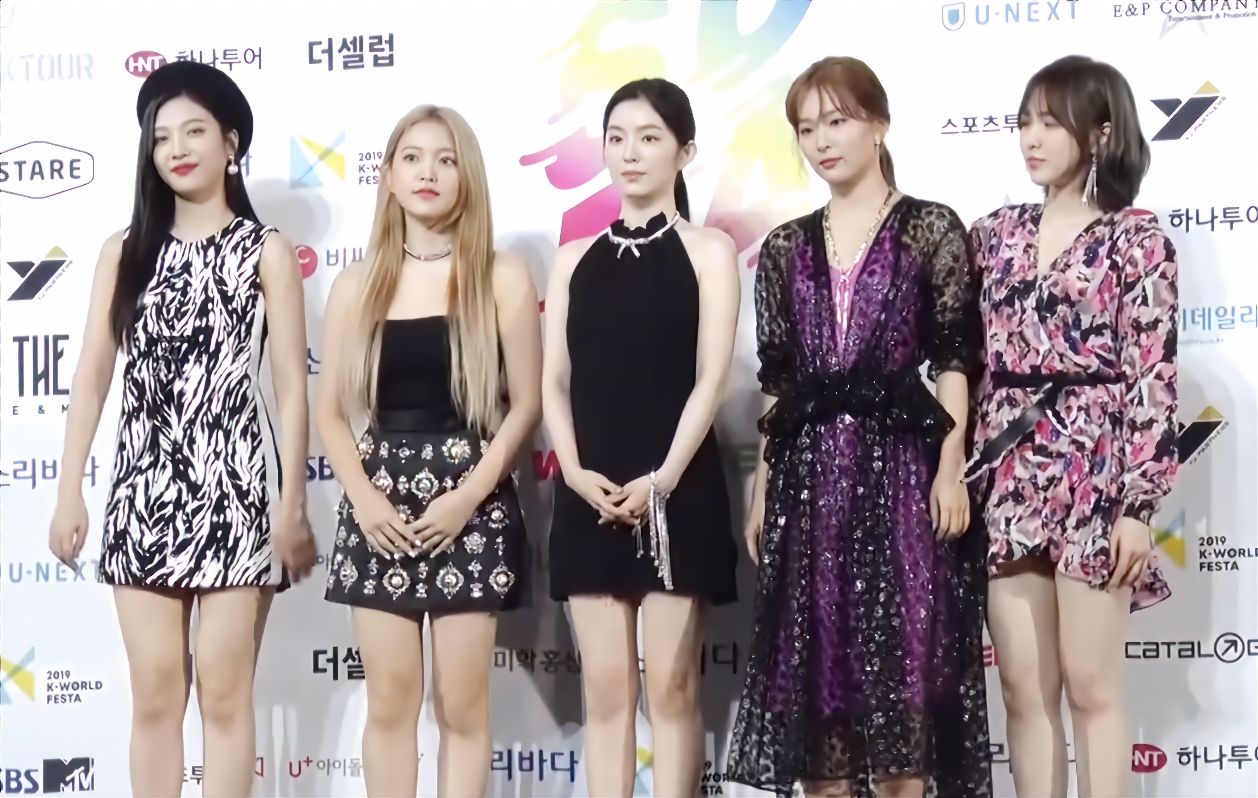
- Red Velvet in Soribada Best K-Music Awards in August 2019
Awards and nominations
Award	Wins	Nominations
Asia Artist Awards	2	13
Asian Pop Music Awards	4	9
Brand Customer Loyalty Awards	1	1
Bugs Music Awards	2	2
Dong-A.com's Pick	1	1
Gaon Chart Music Awards	4	15
Genie Music Awards	2	13
Golden Disc Awards	5	31
Hanteo Music Awards	1	5
Korea First Brand Awards	1	2
Korea PD Awards	1	1
Korea Popular Music Awards	2	6
Korean Entertainment Arts Awards	4	4
Korea Entertainment Producer Association Awards	1	1
Korean Music Awards	1	5
Melon Music Awards	4	15
Mnet Asian Music Awards	2	25
MTV MIAW Awards	0	2
MTV Video Music Awards	0	1
SBS Gayo Daejeon	0	1
Seoul Music Awards	6	27
Seoul Conference on Social Welfare	1	1
Soribada Best K-Music Awards	8	24
Spotify Awards	0	1
Teen Choice Awards	1	1
The Fact Music Awards	3	5
V Live Awards	2	4

Totals (Note: Certain award groups do not simply award one winner. They acknowledge several different recipients, have runners-up, and have third place. Since this is a specific recognition and is different from losing an award, runner-up mentions are considered wins in this award tally. For simplification and to avoid errors, each award in this list has been presumed to have had a prior nomination.)
- Wins: 59
- Nominations: 222

This is a list of awards and nominations received by Red Velvet, a South Korean girl group formed in 2014, by SM Entertainment. Since their debut, the group has received various awards and nominations for music, performances, popularity and impact, including four Circle Chart Music Awards, five Golden Disc Awards, four Melon Music Awards and two Mnet Asian Music Awards, among others.

After debuting with "Happiness" as a four-member group in August 2014, the group won several Rookie awards from award shows in their native country South Korea such as the Golden Disc Awards and Seoul Music Awards. In 2015, they released their debut EP Ice Cream Cake, now as a five-member group following the inclusion of Yeri. The EP won Digital Bonsang at the Golden Disc Awards while its title track won Best Female Dance at the 2015 Melon Music Awards and Best Dance Performance (Female Group) at the 2015 Mnet Asian Music Awards. The same year they released their first studio album The Red.

In 2016, they released "Russian Roulette" from the EP of the same name, its music video was praised and won Best Music Video at the 2016 Melon Music Awards. The following year they released five singles, among them was "Red Flavor", the song was their first number one at the Circle Digital Chart and was nominated for Song of the Year at various awards. Additionally, it won Best K-Pop Song at the Korean Music Awards. At the 2017 Mnet Asian Music Awards, they won Best Female Group for "Red Flavor". The same year they released their second studio album Perfect Velvet, which was nominated for Album Bonsang at the 32nd Golden Disc Awards.

In 2018, they released their first reissue The Perfect Red Velvet, its lead single "Bad Boy" was critically acclaimed and was nominated for Best Dance Performance (Female Group) at the 2018 Mnet Asian Music Awards and Best Pop Song at the Korean Music Awards. Later in the year the single "Powe Up" was released, it won Song of the Year – August at the Gaon Chart Music Awards and was nominated for Song of the Year at the Genie Music Awards. Also in 2018, the group received a commendation awarded at the Korean Popular Culture and Arts Awards, hosted by the South Korean Ministry of Culture, Sports and Tourism, given to recognize individuals or groups for their contribution to popular culture in South Korea and abroad.

In late 2019 they released "Psycho" as the lead single for their first compilation album The ReVe Festival: Finale, the song won Song of the Year – December at the Gaon Chart Music Awards, Digital Bonsang at the 35th Golden Disc Awards and was nominated for the Melon Music Award for Song of the Year, their first nomination for the award. It was also nominated for Best K-Pop at the 2020 MTV Video Music Awards, being their first MTV VMA nomination. In 2022, "Feel My Rhythm" was released, its music video won Best Music Video at the 2022 Genie Music Awards.

== Awards and nominations ==
The name of the award ceremony, year presented, award category, nominee(s) and the result of the award
Award ceremony	Year	Category	Nominee / Work	Result	Ref.
Asia Artist Awards	2016	Singer Popularity Award	Red Velvet	Nominated	
Asia Artist Awards	2017	Singer Popularity Award	Red Velvet	Nominated	
Asia Artist Awards	2018	Singer Popularity Award	Red Velvet	Nominated	
Asia Artist Awards	2019	Singer Popularity Award	Red Velvet	Nominated	
Asia Artist Awards	2019	Grand Prize (Daesang) – Song of the Year	"Umpah Umpah"	Won	
Asia Artist Awards	2019	Asia Celebrity Singer	Red Velvet	Won	
Asia Artist Awards	2019	Female Group Popularity Award	Red Velvet	Nominated	
Asia Artist Awards	2020	Female Group Popularity Award	Red Velvet	Nominated	
Asia Artist Awards	2021	RET Popularity Award – Female Group	Red Velvet	Nominated	
Asia Artist Awards	2021	U+Idol Live Popularity Award – Female Group	Red Velvet	Nominated	
Asia Artist Awards	2022	DCM Popularity Award – Female Singer	Red Velvet	Nominated	
Asia Artist Awards	2022	Idolplus Popularity Award – Singer	Red Velvet	Nominated	
Asia Artist Awards	2023	Popularity Award – Singer (Female)	Red Velvet	Nominated	
Asian Pop Music Awards (Note: Hosted by the Hong Kong Asia Pacific International Group and Sunway Records, the Asian Pop Music Awards bases its winners on "Asian Pop Music Chart" which opened in September 2019.)	2020	Best Music Video (Overseas)	"Psycho"	Won	
Asian Pop Music Awards	2020	Outstanding Group of the Year (Overseas)	Red Velvet	Won	
Asian Pop Music Awards	2020	Best Album (Overseas)	The ReVe Festival: Finale	Nominated	
Asian Pop Music Awards	2020	Best Group (Overseas)	Red Velvet	Nominated	
Asian Pop Music Awards	2020	Song of the Year (Overseas)	"Psycho"	Nominated	
Asian Pop Music Awards	2021	Best Group (Overseas)	Red Velvet	Won	
Asian Pop Music Awards	2021	Top 20 Albums of the Year (Overseas)	Queendom	Won	
Asian Pop Music Awards	2021	Best Album of the Year (Overseas)	Queendom	Nominated	
Asian Pop Music Awards	2021	Best Dance Performance (Overseas)	"Queendom"	Nominated	
Brand Customer Loyalty Awards	2020	Most Influential Female Idol	Red Velvet	Won	
Bugs Music Awards	2020	20th Anniversary Awards – Most Loved Music	"Red Flavor"	Won	
Bugs Music Awards	2020	20th Anniversary Awards – Most Loved Artists	Red Velvet	Won	
Circle Chart Music Awards	2014	Rookie Award	Red Velvet	Nominated	
Circle Chart Music Awards	2015	Hot Performance of the Year	Red Velvet	Won	
Circle Chart Music Awards	2015	Popularity Award	Red Velvet	Nominated	
Circle Chart Music Awards	2015	Song of the Year – September	"Dumb Dumb"	Nominated	
Circle Chart Music Awards	2016	Song of the Year – September	"Russian Roulette"	Nominated	
Circle Chart Music Awards	2017	Song of the Year – February	"Rookie"	Nominated	
Circle Chart Music Awards	2017	Song of the Year – July	"Red Flavor"	Nominated	
Circle Chart Music Awards	2017	Song of the Year – November	"Peek-a-Boo"	Nominated	
Circle Chart Music Awards	2018	Song of the Year – January	"Bad Boy"	Nominated	
Circle Chart Music Awards	2018	Song of the Year – August	"Power Up"	Won	
Circle Chart Music Awards	2019	Song of the Year – June	"Zimzalabim"	Nominated	
Circle Chart Music Awards	2019	Song of the Year – August	"Umpah Umpah"	Nominated	
Circle Chart Music Awards	2020	Song of the Year – December	"Psycho"	Won	
Circle Chart Music Awards	2020	Album of the Year – 1st Quarter	The ReVe Festival: Finale	Nominated	
Circle Chart Music Awards	2021	Artist of the Year (Digital Music) – August	"Queendom"	Won	
Circle Chart Music Awards	2023	Song of the Year – March	"Feel My Rhythm"	Nominated	
Circle Chart Music Awards	2023	Song of the Year – November	"Birthday"	Nominated	
Circle Chart Music Awards	2023	Song of the Year – November	"Bye Bye"	Nominated	
Dong-A.com's Pick	2017	Summer Queens of the Year	Red Velvet	Won	
Genie Music Awards	2018	Artist of the Year	Red Velvet	Nominated	
Genie Music Awards	2018	Best Selling Artist of the Year	Red Velvet	Nominated	
Genie Music Awards	2018	Female Group Award	Red Velvet	Nominated	
Genie Music Awards	2018	Genie Music Popularity Award	Red Velvet	Nominated	
Genie Music Awards	2018	Song of the Year	"Power Up"	Nominated	
Genie Music Awards	2018	Female Dance Award	"Power Up"	Nominated	
Genie Music Awards	2019	The Top Music	"Power Up"	Nominated	
Genie Music Awards	2019	The Performing Artist (Female)	"Power Up"	Nominated	
Genie Music Awards	2019	The Female Group	Red Velvet	Nominated	
Genie Music Awards	2019	The Top Artist	Red Velvet	Nominated	
Genie Music Awards	2019	The Best Selling Artist	Red Velvet	Nominated	
Genie Music Awards	2019	Genie Music Popularity Award	Red Velvet	Nominated	
Genie Music Awards	2019	Global Popularity Award	Red Velvet	Nominated	
Genie Music Awards	2022	Best Music Video	"Feel My Rhythm"	Won	
Genie Music Awards	2022	Best Female Performance Award	Red Velvet	Won	
Genie Music Awards	2022	Best Female Group	Red Velvet	Nominated	
Genie Music Awards	2022	Song of the Year	"Feel My Rhythm"	Nominated	
Genie Music Awards	2022	Album of the Year	The ReVe Festival 2022 – Feel My Rhythm	Nominated	
Golden Disc Awards	2015	Digital Bonsang	"Happiness"	Nominated	
Golden Disc Awards	2015	Rookie Award	Red Velvet	Won	
Golden Disc Awards	2015	Popularity Award	Red Velvet	Nominated	
Golden Disc Awards	2016	Song of the Year (Digital Daesang)	"Ice Cream Cake"	Nominated	
Golden Disc Awards	2016	Digital Bonsang	"Ice Cream Cake"	Won	
Golden Disc Awards	2016	Album Bonsang	The Red	Nominated	
Golden Disc Awards	2016	Popularity Award	Red Velvet	Nominated	
Golden Disc Awards	2016	Global Popularity Award	Red Velvet	Nominated	
Golden Disc Awards	2017	Digital Bonsang	"Russian Roulette"	Nominated	
Golden Disc Awards	2017	Album Bonsang	Russian Roulette	Nominated	
Golden Disc Awards	2017	Ceci Asia Female Icon Award	Red Velvet	Won	
Golden Disc Awards	2017	Popularity Award	Red Velvet	Nominated	
Golden Disc Awards	2017	Asian Choice Popularity Award	Red Velvet	Nominated	
Golden Disc Awards	2018	Digital Bonsang	"Red Flavor"	Won	
Golden Disc Awards	2018	Song of the Year (Digital Daesang)	"Red Flavor"	Nominated	
Golden Disc Awards	2018	Album Bonsang	Perfect Velvet	Nominated	
Golden Disc Awards	2018	Genie Popularity Award	Red Velvet	Nominated	
Golden Disc Awards	2018	Global Popularity Award	Red Velvet	Nominated	
Golden Disc Awards	2019	Digital Bonsang	"Bad Boy"	Nominated	
Golden Disc Awards	2019	Album Bonsang	Summer Magic	Nominated	
Golden Disc Awards	2019	Popularity Award	Red Velvet	Nominated	
Golden Disc Awards	2019	NetEase Music Global Star Popularity Award	Red Velvet	Nominated	
Golden Disc Awards	2020	Album Bonsang	The ReVe Festival: Day 1	Nominated	
Golden Disc Awards	2020	Popularity Award	Red Velvet	Nominated	
Golden Disc Awards	2020	NetEase Music Fans' Choice K-pop Star Award	Red Velvet	Nominated	
Golden Disc Awards	2021	Song of the Year (Digital Daesang)	"Psycho"	Nominated	
Golden Disc Awards	2021	Digital Bonsang	"Psycho"	Won	
Golden Disc Awards	2021	QQ Music Popularity Award	Red Velvet	Nominated	
Golden Disc Awards	2021	Curaprox Popularity Award	Red Velvet	Nominated	
Golden Disc Awards	2022	Digital Bonsang	"Queendom"	Nominated	
Golden Disc Awards	2022	Seezn Popularity Award	Red Velvet	Nominated	
Golden Disc Awards	2023	Digital Bonsang	"Feel My Rhythm"	Nominated	
Golden Disc Awards	2023	Album Bonsang	The ReVe Festival 2022 – Feel My Rhythm	Nominated	
Golden Disc Awards	2023	Popularity Award	Red Velvet	Nominated	
Hanteo Music Awards	2022	Generation Icon Award	Red Velvet	Won	
Hanteo Music Awards	2022	Main Award (Bonsang)	Red Velvet	Nominated	
Hanteo Music Awards	2022	WhosFandom Award	Red Velvet	Nominated	
Hanteo Music Awards	2023	Main Award (Bonsang)	Red Velvet	Nominated	
Hanteo Music Awards	2023	WhosFandom Award	Red Velvet	Nominated	
Korea First Brand Awards	2018	Female Idol	Red Velvet	Won	
Korea First Brand Awards	2022	Female Idol	Red Velvet	Nominated	
Korea PD Awards	2018	Performer of the Year – Singer	Red Velvet	Won	
Korea Popular Music Awards	2018	Group Dance Award	"Power Up"	Won	
Korea Popular Music Awards	2018	Main Award	Red Velvet	Won	
Korea Popular Music Awards	2018	Album Award	Summer Magic	Nominated	
Korea Popular Music Awards	2018	Digital Award	"Power Up"	Nominated	
Korea Popular Music Awards	2018	Singer Award	Red Velvet	Nominated	
Korea Popular Music Awards	2018	Popularity Award	Red Velvet	Nominated	
Korean Entertainment Arts Awards	2015	Best Rookie Award	Red Velvet	Won	
Korean Entertainment Arts Awards	2016	Netizen's Choice Award	Red Velvet	Won	
Korean Entertainment Arts Awards	2017	Best Female Group (Note: The award was named "Girl Group Grand Award" in the 2019 ceremony, even though it wasn't a grand award, but just a regular award category, and this award ceremony isn't a major award ceremony as well, hence not recognised as an actual grand award won.)	Red Velvet	Won	
Korean Entertainment Arts Awards	2019	Best Female Group	Red Velvet	Won	
Korea Entertainment Producer Association Awards	2018	Artist of the Year (Note: This is not a major award show, and the award show was mainly for company officials rather than musical artists, hence this was a special award even though the name "Artist of the Year" was regarded as a grand award in several major award shows.)	Red Velvet	Won	
Korean Music Awards	2017	Best Pop Song	"Russian Roulette"	Nominated	
Korean Music Awards	2018	Song of the Year	"Red Flavor"	Nominated	
Korean Music Awards	2018	Best Pop Song	"Red Flavor"	Won	
Korean Music Awards	2018	Best Pop Album	Perfect Velvet	Nominated	
Korean Music Awards	2019	Best Pop Song	"Bad Boy"	Nominated	
Korean Music Awards	2023	Best K-Pop Song	"Feel My Rhythm"	Nominated	
MAMA Awards	2023	Worldwide Fans' Choice Top 10	Red Velvet	Nominated	
Melon Music Awards	2014	New Artist Award	Red Velvet	Nominated	
Melon Music Awards	2015	Best Female Dance	"Ice Cream Cake"	Won	
Melon Music Awards	2016	Best Music Video	"Russian Roulette"	Won	
Melon Music Awards	2016	Top 10	Red Velvet	Won	
Melon Music Awards	2016	Best Female Dance	Red Velvet	Nominated	
Melon Music Awards	2017	Top 10	Red Velvet	Won	
Melon Music Awards	2017	Kakao Hot Star Award	Red Velvet	Nominated	
Melon Music Awards	2017	Best Female Dance	"Red Flavor"	Nominated	
Melon Music Awards	2018	Top 10	Red Velvet	Nominated	
Melon Music Awards	2018	Netizen Popularity Award	Red Velvet	Nominated	
Melon Music Awards	2018	Kakao Hot Star Award	Red Velvet	Nominated	
Melon Music Awards	2019	Netizen Popularity Award	Red Velvet	Nominated	
Melon Music Awards	2020	Song of the Year	"Psycho"	Nominated	
Melon Music Awards	2020	Best Female Dance	"Psycho"	Nominated	
Melon Music Awards	2020	Top 10	Red Velvet	Nominated	
Mnet Asian Music Awards	2015	Best Dance Performance (Female Group)	"Ice Cream Cake"	Won	
Mnet Asian Music Awards	2016	Best Female Group	Red Velvet	Nominated	
Mnet Asian Music Awards	2016	iQiYi Worldwide Favorite Artist	Red Velvet	Nominated	
Mnet Asian Music Awards	2016	Best Dance Performance (Female Group)	"Russian Roulette"	Nominated	
Mnet Asian Music Awards	2017	Best Female Group	Red Velvet	Won	
Mnet Asian Music Awards	2017	Qoo10 2017 Favorite KPOP Star	Red Velvet	Nominated	
Mnet Asian Music Awards	2017	Song of the Year	"Red Flavor"	Nominated	
Mnet Asian Music Awards	2017	Best Dance Performance (Female Group)	"Red Flavor"	Nominated	
Mnet Asian Music Awards	2018	Album of the Year	The Perfect Red Velvet	Nominated	
Mnet Asian Music Awards	2018	Best Dance Performance (Female Group)	"Bad Boy"	Nominated	
Mnet Asian Music Awards	2018	Best Female Group	Red Velvet	Nominated	
Mnet Asian Music Awards	2018	Favorite Dance Artist (Female)	Red Velvet	Nominated	
Mnet Asian Music Awards	2019	Best Female Group	Red Velvet	Nominated	
Mnet Asian Music Awards	2019	Worldwide Fans' Choice Top 10	Red Velvet	Nominated	
Mnet Asian Music Awards	2019	2019 Qoo10 Favorite Female Artist	Red Velvet	Nominated	
Mnet Asian Music Awards	2019	Best Dance Performance (Female Group)	"Zimzalabim"	Nominated	
Mnet Asian Music Awards	2020	Best Female Group	Red Velvet	Nominated	
Mnet Asian Music Awards	2020	Worldwide Fans' Choice Top 10	Red Velvet	Nominated	
Mnet Asian Music Awards	2020	Best Dance Performance – Female Group	"Psycho"	Nominated	
Mnet Asian Music Awards	2020	Song of the Year	"Psycho"	Nominated	
Mnet Asian Music Awards	2021	TikTok Artist of the Year	Red Velvet	Nominated	
Mnet Asian Music Awards	2021	Best Female Group	Red Velvet	Nominated	
Mnet Asian Music Awards	2021	Worldwide Fans' Choice Top 10	Red Velvet	Nominated	
Mnet Asian Music Awards	2021	TikTok Song of the Year	"Queendom"	Nominated	
Mnet Asian Music Awards	2021	Best Dance Performance – Female Group	"Queendom"	Nominated	
MTV MIAW Awards	2018	K-Pop Revolution	Red Velvet	Nominated	
MTV MIAW Awards	2019	K-Pop Explosion	Red Velvet	Nominated	
MTV Video Music Awards	2020	Best K-Pop	"Psycho"	Nominated	
SBS Gayo Daejeon	2014	Best New Artist	Red Velvet	Nominated	
Seoul Music Awards	2015	Rookie Award	Red Velvet	Won	
Seoul Music Awards	2015	Main Award	Red Velvet	Nominated	
Seoul Music Awards	2015	Popularity Award	Red Velvet	Nominated	
Seoul Music Awards	2015	K-wave Popularity Award	Red Velvet	Nominated	
Seoul Music Awards	2016	Main Award	Red Velvet	Won	
Seoul Music Awards	2016	Grand Award	Red Velvet	Nominated	
Seoul Music Awards	2016	Popularity Award	Red Velvet	Nominated	
Seoul Music Awards	2016	K-wave Popularity Award	Red Velvet	Nominated	
Seoul Music Awards	2017	Main Award	Red Velvet	Won	
Seoul Music Awards	2017	Grand Award	Red Velvet	Nominated	
Seoul Music Awards	2017	Popularity Award	Red Velvet	Nominated	
Seoul Music Awards	2017	K-wave Popularity Award	Red Velvet	Nominated	
Seoul Music Awards	2018	Main Award	Red Velvet	Won	
Seoul Music Awards	2018	Grand Award	Red Velvet	Nominated	
Seoul Music Awards	2018	Popularity Award	Red Velvet	Nominated	
Seoul Music Awards	2018	K-wave Popularity Award	Red Velvet	Nominated	
Seoul Music Awards	2019	Main Award	Red Velvet	Won	
Seoul Music Awards	2019	Grand Award	Red Velvet	Nominated	
Seoul Music Awards	2019	Popularity Award	Red Velvet	Nominated	
Seoul Music Awards	2019	K-wave Popularity Award	Red Velvet	Nominated	
Seoul Music Awards	2020	Main Award	Red Velvet	Won	
Seoul Music Awards	2020	Album Grand Award	Red Velvet	Nominated	
Seoul Music Awards	2020	Digital Grand Award	Red Velvet	Nominated	
Seoul Music Awards	2020	Popularity Award	Red Velvet	Nominated	
Seoul Music Awards	2020	K-wave Popularity Award	Red Velvet	Nominated	
Seoul Music Awards	2020	QQ Music Popularity Award	Red Velvet	Nominated	
Seoul Music Awards	2021	WhosFandom Award	Red Velvet	Nominated	
Seoul Conference on Social Welfare	2017	Seoul Mayor's Award	Red Velvet	Won	
Soribada Best K-Music Awards	2017	Main Award	Red Velvet	Won	
Soribada Best K-Music Awards	2017	Icon Award	Red Velvet	Won	
Soribada Best K-Music Awards	2017	Grand Award	Red Velvet	Nominated	
Soribada Best K-Music Awards	2017	Digital Grand Award	Red Velvet	Nominated	
Soribada Best K-Music Awards	2017	Popularity Award	Red Velvet	Nominated	
Soribada Best K-Music Awards	2018	Main Award	Red Velvet	Won	
Soribada Best K-Music Awards	2018	Artist Award	Red Velvet	Won	
Soribada Best K-Music Awards	2018	Grand Award	Red Velvet	Nominated	
Soribada Best K-Music Awards	2018	Digital Grand Award	Red Velvet	Nominated	
Soribada Best K-Music Awards	2018	Female Popularity Award	Red Velvet	Nominated	
Soribada Best K-Music Awards	2018	Global Fandom Award	Red Velvet	Nominated	
Soribada Best K-Music Awards	2019	Stage of the Year	Red Velvet	Won	
Soribada Best K-Music Awards	2019	Main Award	Red Velvet	Won	
Soribada Best K-Music Awards	2019	Artist of the Year	Red Velvet	Nominated	
Soribada Best K-Music Awards	2019	Music of the Year	Red Velvet	Nominated	
Soribada Best K-Music Awards	2019	Live Performance of the Year	Red Velvet	Nominated	
Soribada Best K-Music Awards	2019	Female Popularity Award	Red Velvet	Nominated	
Soribada Best K-Music Awards	2020	Music of the Year (Note: Formerly a grand award category, it has been demoted off its grand award category status to a regular award category since 2020.)	Red Velvet	Won	
Soribada Best K-Music Awards	2020	Main Award	Red Velvet	Won	
Soribada Best K-Music Awards	2020	Grand Award	Red Velvet	Nominated	
Soribada Best K-Music Awards	2020	Artist of the Year	Red Velvet	Nominated	
Soribada Best K-Music Awards	2020	Stage of the Year	Red Velvet	Nominated	
Soribada Best K-Music Awards	2020	Female Popularity Award	Red Velvet	Nominated	
Soribada Best K-Music Awards	2020	Global Artist Award	Red Velvet	Nominated	
Spotify Awards	2020	Most-Streamed Kpop Female Artist	Red Velvet	Nominated	
Teen Choice Awards	2019	Choice Electronic/Dance Song	"Close to Me (Red Velvet Remix)"	Won	
The Fact Music Awards	2019	The Fact Music Grand Award	Red Velvet	Nominated	
The Fact Music Awards	2019	Artist of This Year	Red Velvet	Won	
The Fact Music Awards	2019	World Wide Icon	Red Velvet	Won	
The Fact Music Awards	2020	This Year's Artist	Red Velvet	Won	
The Fact Music Awards	2020	Grand Award	Red Velvet	Nominated	
V Live Awards	2019	Artist Top 10	Red Velvet	Nominated	
V Live Awards	2019	Best Artist	Red Velvet	Won	
V Live Awards	2019	Best Channel – 1 million followers	Red Velvet	Won	
V Live Awards	2019	Global Artist Top 12	Red Velvet	Nominated	

== Other accolades ==
=== State and cultural honors ===
Name of country or organization, year given, and name of honor
Country	Year	Honor	Ref.
South Korea (Note: Awarded at the Korean Popular Culture and Arts Awards, organized by the Korea Creative Content Agency and hosted by the South Korean Ministry of Culture, Sports and Tourism. Commendations are given to individuals or groups for their contribution to popular culture in South Korea and abroad.)	2018	Minister of Culture, Sports and Tourism Commendation	

=== Listicles ===
Name of publisher, year listed, name of listicle, and placement
Publisher	Year	Listicle	Placement	Ref.
Forbes	2018	Korea Power Celebrity	11th	
Forbes	2019	Korea Power Celebrity	5th	
Forbes	2020	100 Digital Stars (Asia)	Placed	
Teen Vogue	2024	21 Best Girl Groups of All Time	Placed	

== See also ==
- Awards and nominations received by Irene
- Awards and nominations received by Seulgi
- Awards and nominations received by Wendy
- Awards and nominations received by Joy
- Awards and nominations received by Yeri
