= The ReVe Festival 2022 – Birthday =

- Digital cover

EP by Red Velvet
- Released: November 28, 2022
- Studios: SM Studios (Seoul, South Korea)
- Genres: Dance-pop; electropop; hyperpop; R&B; trap; EDM
- Length: 15:59
- Languages: Korean; English
- Labels: SM; Dreamus

Red Velvet chronology
Bloom (2022)	The ReVe Festival 2022 – Birthday (2022)	Chill Kill (2023)

Singles from The ReVe Festival 2022 – Birthday
- 1. "Birthday" Released: November 28, 2022

Professional ratings
Review scores
Source	Rating
NME	3/5 stars

The ReVe Festival 2022 – Birthday (occasionally referred just as Birthday) is the sixth special extended play and fourteenth overall by South Korean girl group Red Velvet. It was released by SM Entertainment on November 28, 2022, and contains five tracks, including the lead single "Birthday". The EP is the second installment of The ReVe Festival 2022, and the fifth overall of The ReVe Festival series.

== Background and release ==
On October 28, 2022, SM Entertainment announced Red Velvet would be releasing a new album in November 2022. On November 7, it was announced the group will be releasing their sixth special extended play titled The ReVe Festival 2022 – Birthday, alongside the lead single "Birthday", on November 28. The EP was described as part of The ReVe Festival 2022 series which starts off with The ReVe Festival 2022 – Feel My Rhythm, released in March 2022, and is continuation of The ReVe Festival trilogy released in 2019. On November 14, the promotional schedule was released. In addition, it was also announced that the EP would contains a total of five tracks. A day later, the mood sampler teaser video was released. On November 27, the music video teaser for "Birthday" was released. The EP was released alongside the music video for "Birthday" on November 28.

== Composition ==
The ReVe Festival 2022 – Birthday consists of five tracks. The lead single "Birthday" was described a pop dance song that samples George Gershwin's composition Rhapsody in Blue, featuring trap, drum, and synth rhythm with lyrics about "returning to the birthday of the person you like and making all of your dreams come true, giving yourself a day to remember". "Bye Bye" was described as a R&B pop dance song with "groovy and dynamic bass and cool string sound". "On a Ride" was described as hyperpop dance song featuring "light beat rhythm characterized by plucked string instrument giving the listener a vibe that makes them feel as if they were in an amusement park". "Zoom" was described as R&B pop dance song featuring "aggressive bass and a dramatic synth rhythm" with lyrics that "describe about a lover thrillingly digging up evidence about their other lying half". "Celebrate" was described as medium tempo R&B ballad song featuring "relax and cozy melody" with "warm aftertaste" lyrics about "the desire to be with the person you love forever, even if you turn back time".

== Promotion ==
Prior to the release of The ReVe Festival 2022 – Birthday, on November 28, 2022, the group held a live event on YouTube and TikTok to introduce the EP and to communicate with their fans.

== Track listing ==
Track listing for The ReVe Festival 2022 – Birthday
No.	Title	Lyrics	Music	Arrangement	Length
1.	"Birthday"	Kim Min-ji (Jam Factory)	Ejae; Nicole "Kole" Cohen; Isaac Han; Aaron Kim; Ghostchild Ltd; Loosen Door	Isaac Han; Aaron Kim; Ghostchild Ltd; Loosen Door	3:36
2.	"Bye Bye"	Kenzie	Kenzie; Ludvig Evers; Jonatan Gusmark; Moa "Cazzi Opeia" Carlebecker; Ellen Berg	Kenzie; Moonshine	3:16
3.	"On a Ride" (롤러 코스터; Rolleo Koseuteo; lit. 'Roller Coaster')	Danke (Lalala Studio)	Ryvng (153/Joombas); Maynine (153/Joombas); Tim Tan; Ciara Muscat; Perrie (153/Joombas); Oh Hyung-seok	Tim Tan; Ryvng (153/Joombas); Maynine (153/Joombas)	3:19
4.	"Zoom"	Hwang Yu-bin	Jinbyjin; Karen Poole; Farida Bolseth Benounis; Sondre Mulongo Nystrøm; Anne Judith Wik	Jinbyjin	3:04
5.	"Celebrate"	Bay (153/Joombas)	Kenneth Chris Mackey; Anna Graceman	Chris "Dirty Rice" Mackey	2:44
Total length:					15:59

Notes

- "Birthday" samples composition Rhapsody in Blue by George Gershwin.

== Charts ==
=== Weekly charts ===
Weekly chart performance
Chart (2022–2023)	Peak position
Japanese Albums (Oricon)	16
Japanese Combined Albums (Oricon)	18
Japanese Hot Albums (Billboard Japan)	11
South Korean Albums (Circle)	2

=== Monthly charts ===
Monthly chart performance
Chart (2022)	Peak position
Japanese Albums (Oricon)	24
South Korean Albums (Circle)	2

=== Year-end chart ===
Year-end chart performance
Chart (2022)	Position
South Korea Albums (Circle)	23

== Certifications and sales ==
Certifications and sales
Region	Certification	Certified units/sales
South Korea (KMCA)	3× Platinum	1,014,851

== Release history ==
Release history
Region	Date	Format	Label
South Korea	November 28, 2022	CD	SM; Dreamus
Various	November 28, 2022	Digital download; streaming	SM; Dreamus
South Korea	December 5, 2022	SMC	SM; Dreamus

== See also ==
- The ReVe Festival: Day 1
- The ReVe Festival: Day 2
- The ReVe Festival: Finale
- The ReVe Festival 2022 – Feel My Rhythm
