= Air on the G String =

1871 Bach arrangement by August Wilhelmj

"Air on the G String", also known as "Air for G String" and "Celebrated Air", is August Wilhelmj's 1871 arrangement of the second movement of Johann Sebastian Bach's Orchestral Suite No. 3 in D major, BWV 1068. The arrangement differs from the original in that it is transposed down into C major so the part of the first violins can be played entirely on the violin's lowest string (the G string, hence the name), which gave the piece its popular title.

Bach originally composed the "Air" in the early 1730s during his tenure in Köthen as part of a five-movement suite for orchestra, in which only strings and basso continuo participate in the second movement. Wilhelmj's adaptation emphasizes a Romantic-era sensibility, with muted accompaniment and subdued dynamics, contrasting with Bach's original Baroque texture.

The arrangement's popularity grew steadily in the late 19th and early 20th centuries, especially after performances at the Promenade Concerts (the Proms) in London. Critics and musicians offered mixed responses—some praised its lyrical reinterpretation, while others, such as Joseph Joachim and Donald Francis Tovey, dismissed it as a distortion of Bach's intent.

Since then, "Air on the G String" has become a cultural staple: featured in films like Se7en (1995) and The Spy Who Loved Me (1977), used in advertising campaigns, and frequently recorded in diverse arrangements, ranging from saxophone ensemble to metal reinterpretations, all preserving the name regardless of the original G‑string solo concept.

== Bach's original ==
"Air" from Bach's Orchestral Suite No. 3
Air
performed by The Adolf Busch Chamber Players (1937)

Bach's third Orchestral Suite in D major, composed in the first half of the 18th century, has an "Air" as second movement, following its French overture opening movement. The suite is composed for three trumpets, timpani, two oboes, strings (two violin parts and a viola part), and basso continuo. In the second movement of the suite however only the strings and the continuo play. This is the only movement of the suite where all other instruments are silent.

The music of the "Air" is written on four staves, for first and second violins, viola(s), and continuo. The interweaving melody lines of the high strings contrast with the pronounced rhythmic drive in the bass.

== Wilhelmj's arrangement ==
"Air on the G String"
Violin and piano (1920)
performed by Joel Belov (violin) and Robert Gayler (piano)

In 1871, violinist August Wilhelmj arranged the second movement of Bach's third Orchestral Suite for violin and an accompaniment of strings, piano or organ (harmonium). On the score he wrote auf der G-Saite (on the G string) above the staff for the solo violin, which gave the arrangement its nickname.

In Wilhelmj's version the piece is transposed down from its original key (D major) to C major. Then the part of the first violins is transposed further down an octave and given to a solo violin that can play the entire melody on its lowest string, the G string. The dynamic markings added by Wilhelmj are more in line with a Romantic interpretation than with the Baroque original.

As the violin is unable to play with much volume in its lowest register, all the other parts of Bach's music were firmly reduced in Wilhelmj's version: the keyboard part is to be played staccato and pianissimo, causing the effects of interweaving melodies and of drive in the bass part to get lost. The accompanying violins and violas play muted (con sordino), and the bass part for cellos and double basses is to be played pizzicato and sempre pianissimo, with the same change in effect compared to Bach's original.

Later, a spurious story circulated that the melody was always intended to be played on the G string alone. The solo violin part of Wilhelmj's arrangement is sometimes played on the counter-tenor violoncello.

Wilhelmj's arrangement greatly popularized the piece and although his version is rarely played anymore, his original title on the G string or Air on the G string has been retained as the commonly used name of various arrangements whether or not a string instrument playing on its G string is involved. Most of these versions have in common that the original melody of the first violins is played in the low register of a solo instrument, accompanied by a reduction of the material of the other parts of Bach's piece, although occasionally versions that stay more in line with Bach's original can go by the same name.

== Further arrangements of Wilhelmj's arrangement ==
This arranged piece was itself arranged countless times, in key or instrumentation, for orchestra, saxophone, accordion, synthesizer, recorder ensemble ... paralleling and overlapping other arrangements of the same original.

== Reception ==
In a period that stretched over three decades, and started in 1905, Henry Wood regularly programmed Wilhelmj's arrangement at the London Proms. Wood recorded his orchestral rendering (i.e., the G string part performed by a group of violins) of the Bach/Wilhelmj "Air" in the early 1930s.

=== Early recordings ===
Recordings of Wilhelmj's "Air on the G String" arrangement, from the era preceding the Second World War, include:

Early recordings of Air on the G String
Rec.	Soloist	Accompaniment or Ensemble (Conductor)	Company Matrix (Take)	Title
1902	Hartmann, Leopold		Gramophone 2155B	Air auf der G-Saite
1903	Dessau, Bernhard		Gramophone 1528x	Air auf der G-Saite
1904-02-01	Kreisler, Fritz		Gramophone 2087x	
1905-03-01	Geyer, Stefi	Dienzl, Oszkár [piano]		
1909–05	Rosé, Arnold		Gramophone 14680u	Air auf der G-Saite
1911-01-01	Vecsey, Ferenc			
1911-05-17	Elman, Mischa	Kahn, Percy B. [piano]	Victor C-9871 (3)	Air for G string
1913-10-01	Kubelík, Jan	Falkenstein, George [piano]	Victor B-13892 (1)	Air for G String
1913-11-09		Bournemouth Municipal Orchestra (Godfrey, Dan)	Gramophone	
1918–07	Belov, Joel	Gayler, Robert [piano]	Edison 6289 (A–C)	Air for G string
1919-01-03	Belov, Joel	Gayler, Robert [piano]	Edison 6289 (F–H)	Air for G string
1919-11-11	Elman, Mischa	Bonime, Joseph [piano]	Victor C-9871 (5)	Air for G string
1921-04-01	Weißgerber, Andreas	Raucheisen, Michael [piano]	Odéon xxB6659	
1923-01-24		Royal Albert Hall Orchestra (Goossens, Eugene)	His Master's Voice Cc2215(-4)	
c. 1920–26	Soldat-Roeger, Marie		Union A3012 (3)	
1923-08-10	Strockoff, Leo		Columbia AX126	
1924-01-01	Příhoda, Váša			
1927	Rosé, Arnold	Rosé Quartet	His Master's Voice Ck2847 (1)	
1927-02-14	Thibaud, Jacques	Craxton, Harold [piano]	HMV Cc9913	
1928	Rosé, Arnold	Rosé Quartet	HMV Ck2847 (2)	
1929-11-04	Hubay, Jenő	Budapest Conservatory Orchestra (Zsolt, Nándor)	HMV CV713	
1930-02-25	Cassadó, Gaspar [cello]		Columbia WAX5416	
1930-09-16	Huberman, Bronisław	Schultze, Siegfried [piano]	Columbia WAX5007	
1931-03-05	Zimbalist, Efrem	Sanderberg, Theo [piano]	Columbia 98737 (1)	Air on the G string
1932-06-16		British Symphony Orchestra (Wood, Henry)	Columbia CAX6441(-1)	Air on G String
1936-05-20	Benedetti, René	Orch. de la Société des Concerts du Conservatoire	Columbia CLX1919	

Soldat-Roeger's recorded performance of the "Air on the G String" was the subject of scholarly analysis.

=== Appreciation of Wilhelmj's arrangement ===
In the early 20th century, Joseph Joachim called Wilhelmj's arrangement "a shameless falsification of a work by Bach". In Casper Höweler's XYZ der Muziek (1936, here quoted from the 1939 edition):

Het Air, alleen voor strijkers en continuo, met zijn volmaakte cantilenen in alle stemmen, van sfeer een onovertroffen 'Der Welt abhanden gekommen', heeft de ontstellendste majesteitschennis ondergaan, die de muziek meemaakte: de violist Wilhelmj maakte er een zwoel effect-stukje van, door het als 'Aria op de g snaar' te zetten, waarbij zoowel de evenwichtige polyphonie als de teere stemming vandalistisch vernield werden.

— X-Y-Z der muziek (1939)
Translation:

The "Air", exclusively for strings and continuo, with its perfect singing in all voices, breathing an unsurpassed "lost to the world", has suffered the most appalling regicide in music: the violinist Wilhelmj converted it to sultry claptrap by setting it as "Aria on the G String", thus vandalising and annihilating both its equilibrated polyphony and delicate atmosphere.

— translation

British musicologist Donald Francis Tovey likewise criticized Wihelmj's arrangement, stating that "At my concerts [the Air] will be heard as Bach wrote it, in its original D major as an angelic soprano strain, not in C major as a display of contralto depths."

== In popular music ==
- The 1967 song "A Whiter Shade of Pale" by Procol Harum used a bar or two of "Air on the G String" as its starting point according to its writer Gary Brooker.
- The Dutch group Ekseption recorded a jazz-fusion version titled "Air" which reached No. 1 on the Dutch chart in 1969.
- The German group Sweetbox recorded a rap song "Everything's Gonna Be Alright" backed with music from "Air on the G String" in 1997, which became a world-wide hit.
- The South Korean girl group Red Velvet uses its sample for their song "Feel My Rhythm" taken from their 2022 EP The ReVe Festival 2022 – Feel My Rhythm.
- The Japanese girl group Hinatazaka46 sampled the opening of "Air on the G String" for their 15th single, titled "Onegai Bach!"
- The London electronic duo Bassvictim named the opening track on their 2024 EP Basspunk "Air on a G String".

== In popular culture ==
In the 1995 film Se7en, the piece is used as Detective Mills and Somerset look through crime photographs.

The piece is used in the 1997 Japanese anime apocalyptic science fiction film The End of Evangelion, towards the end of the movie's first half.

The 2000 Japanese action film Battle Royale features the piece in its soundtrack.

== Sources ==
- Cho, Jung Yoon (2017). Re-interpreting Brahms Violin Sonatas: Understanding the Composer's Expectations (PDF) (PhD). University of Leeds.
- French, Hannah Chloe (2014). The Role of Sir Henry J. Wood in the English Bach Awakening: Orchestral Bach at the Proms 1895-1944 (PDF) (PhD). University of Leeds.
- Höweler, Casper [in French]; et al. (1939). "Bach, Johann Sebastian". X-Y-Z der muziek [X-Y-Z of Music] (in Dutch) (3rd ed.). Utrecht: W. de Haan. pp. 5–48.
- Kelly, Allen (2009) [1994]. Capon, Brian (ed.). "The Gramophone Company – Standard German Catalogue (A–B–C)". operadis-opera-discography.org.uk.
- Milsom, David (2015a) [2007]. "Marie Soldat-Roeger (1863-1955): Her Significance to the Study of Nineteenth-Century Performing Practices" ( (PDF)). String Chamber Music of the Classical German School, 1840-1900: A Scholarly Investigation through Reconstructive Performance (Report). Arts & Humanities Research Council (ahrc.ukri.org). Archived from the original on 2021-10-07.
- Milsom, David (2015b) [2009]. "Discography" ( (PDF)). String Chamber Music of the Classical German School, 1840-1900: A Scholarly Investigation through Reconstructive Performance (Report). Arts & Humanities Research Council (ahrc.ukri.org). Archived from the original on 2021-10-07.
