= Psycho (Red Velvet song) =

2019 single by Red Velvet

Single by Red Velvet

from the album The ReVe Festival: Finale
- Language: Korean
- Released: December 23, 2019
- Studio: SM SSAM Studio (Seoul)
- Genre: R&B; trap; future bass; pop
- Length: 3:31
- Label: SM; Dreamus
- Composers: Andrew "Druski" Scott; Cazzi Opeia; Ejae
- Lyricist: Kenzie

Red Velvet singles chronology
"Umpah Umpah" (2019)	"Psycho" (2019)	"Queendom" (2021)

Music video
- "Psycho" on YouTube

"Psycho" is a song that was recorded by South Korean girl group Red Velvet and was released as the lead single from their first compilation album The ReVe Festival: Finale (2019), which is the third and final installment in the group's album trilogy The ReVe Festival. The song was composed by Andrew "Druski" Scott, Cazzi Opeia, and Ejae; was arranged by the former Druski and long-time SM Entertainment record producer Yoo Young-jin; and the Korean lyrics were written by Kenzie. "Psycho" is an R&B track that incorporates elements of pop, trap and future bass, and is about a couple who are in a complicated romantic relationship. A gothic-themed music video accompanied the single's digital release on December 23, 2019.

"Psycho" received positive reviews from music critics for its "smooth and sultry" delivery and its "haunting", "catchy yet structured" production. Though released at the end of 2019, critics cited the single as one of the best K-pop songs of that year. The song charted at number one in Singapore and in North America, where it was the group's second number-one song on the Billboard World Digital Songs chart and tied them with 2NE1 as the girl groups with the most top-10 entries on the ranking. It peaked at number two in Malaysia and for three consecutive weeks on South Korea's Gaon Digital Chart, giving Red Velvet their 12th domestic top-10 entry. The song also charted at number 10 on the New Zealand Hot Singles chart, and spent one week at number 99 on the component UK Singles Downloads Chart, marking the group's UK chart debut.

== Background and release ==
Following Red Velvet's third concert La Rouge in November 2019, SM Entertainment revealed two teaser posters on social media at 00:00 on December 12 that year, along with an official press release that confirmed Finale would conclude Red Velvet's "Music Festival" trilogy throughout 2019. Two days later, the first batch of teaser photographs were posted on the group's official social media accounts, including "Psycho" as the lead single for this release. The song's instrumental intro was also revealed on their official Instagram account before a 17-second video teaser for the song was uploaded to the official SM Town YouTube channel. The music video was released the following day.

== Composition ==
"Psycho"
"Psycho" is an R&B and future bass track that includes Red Velvet singing about a relationship "full of ups and downs".

"Psycho" was written by American record producer Andrew "Druski" Scott, Korean-American singer-songwriter Ejae, and their frequent Swedish collaborator Cazzi Opeia during a 2017 songwriting camp in Seoul, South Korea. Following a conversation between the three composers about a relationship issue/breakup in which "being heartbroken is almost like feeling psycho", they started working the idea into a song. Having acknowledged Red Velvet's dual sonic concepts, in which "Red" refers to the group's mild and vibrant image, and "Velvet" refers to their smooth R&B side, Scott wanted to "blend the two" concepts together. Ejae recorded a demo version in English that was leaked on the Internet weeks before the song's release; songwriter Kenzie rewrote the lyrics in Korean with additional arrangement from producer Druski and Yoo Young-jin, the latter of whom co-produced the group's previous single "Bad Boy" in 2018.

Musically, "Psycho" has been described as an up-tempo urban song; Tamar Herman of Billboard described it as an R&B-pop track with future bass, a "grandiose operatic" instrumental intro with "dramatic" pizzicato strings, "classical" chords and trap beats, squelching synthesizers, which made it the group's seventh single to fall under the "Velvet" concept. According to Scott, the chorus contains the syncopation of hi-hats that is combined with the drum line to maintain the song's pace. It was composed in the key of Eb major with a tempo of 140 beats per minute. The group's vocals span two octaves, from the low note of G3 to the high-note of G5. A slightly different version of the song was used for the music video; the chorus has an additional synth line and the pre-chorus included a string melody, elements that were omitted from the digital and streaming version. The song's lyrics tell the story of a relationship that is "full of ups and downs" in which a couple "fights so much that they appear crazy in the eyes of others but are nonetheless meant for each other" and eventually assure the listener "we're gonna be alright".

== Commercial performance ==
"Psycho" debuted at number two on South Korea's Gaon Digital Chart for the period December 22–28, 2019, the year's final chart; rapper Changmo's "Meteor" blocked it from reaching number one for three consecutive weeks. The song entered the Monthly Digital Chart for December at number 31 and peaked at number three on the January 2020 issue. The song entered the Billboard K-Pop Hot 100 at number nine on the chart issue dated December 28, 2019. On the chart issue dated January 1, 2020, "Psycho" peaked at number two, where it remained for two consecutive weeks. In November 2020, the song received platinum certification from the Korea Music Content Association for surpassing 100 million streams. "Psycho" was the ninth-best performing single of 2020 on Gaon's Year-end Digital Chart, and the only one by an idol group to appear in the top ten.

On the week of January 4, 2020, "Psycho" debuted at number one on the US Billboard World Digital Songs Chart, giving Red Velvet their second US number-one song following their 2018 single "RBB (Really Bad Boy)". This made them one of the nine K-pop artists to top the chart more than once, and the fourth girl group to do this. Moreover, "Psycho" became Red Velvet's 16th top-ten entry, thus tying with 2NE1 as the South Korean girl groups with the most top-ten entries on the chart. The song also became Red Velvet's second entry on the New Zealand Hot Singles chart after "Zimzalabim", entering at number 10 for the week of December 30, 2019. It also debuted at number 99 on the UK Singles Downloads Chart, where it spent one week, becoming their first song to appear on a UK component chart.

== Live performances ==
Red Velvet delivered their first live performance of "Psycho" at the ReVe Festival FINALE Party on December 22, 2019, which premiered exclusively on V Live. The group's attendance at the annual SBS Gayo Daejeon for the debut television performance of the single was confirmed on 25 December but vocalist Wendy was injured during rehearsals and a pre-recorded performance was aired instead. The group subsequently performed as a quartet, and covered all of Wendy's parts, at the 29th Seoul Music Awards on January 30, 2020. "Psycho" was also included in Red Velvet's three-song set for the SMTOWN Live Culture Humanity online live concert on January 1, 2021.

== Critical reception ==
Professional ratings
Review scores
Source	Rating
IZM	3.5/5 stars

Following its initial release, music critics gave "Psycho" positive reviews. Tamar Herman of Billboard magazine said the track is "smooth and sultry in its delivery". In an individual song review, writer Kim Do-hyun of IZM said the track is "an upgraded version" of "Bad Boy" and praised the balancing of "a great melody, interesting themes and performance" that crafted "a good song" and rated it three-and-a-half stars out of five. Refinery29's Natalie Morin wrote the song has "all the charm and swagger of ...'Bad Boy' but with an updated, sophisticated glow". In an interview with the song's producer in February 2020, writer Yim Hyun-su of The Korea Herald described "Psycho" as a "catchy earworm" and said Red Velvet "shows no signs of stopping anytime soon".

Despite being released in December, "Psycho" appeared on several year-end music lists as one of the best K-pop releases of 2019. Billboard ranked it at number 18 on their critics-pick list. L'Officiel Malaysia cited "Psycho" as one of 14 definitive K-pop songs of 2019 and called it a "go-to track to sing in the shower". Online magazine Tonplein described "Psycho" as "the track that has created the most impressive spot among K-pop works released over the past year" and put it at number one on their list. "Psycho" was also placed at number one on Paper's list "The 40 Best K-Pop Songs of 2020".

"Psycho" on select critic lists
Critic/Publication	List	Rank	Ref.
Billboard	The 25 Best K-pop Songs of 2019: Critics' Picks	18	
CNN Philippines	Our best K-pop songs of 2020	No order	
Melon	Top 100 K-pop Songs of All Time	85	
The Forty-Five	The 45 best K-pop songs of all-time	5	
Paper	The 40 Best K-pop Songs of 2020	1	
Tonplein	Top 30 K-pop Songs of 2020	1	

== Accolades ==
Despite Red Velvet not attending nor performing on any television music show, "Psycho" won nine music-show trophies by January 2020, became the group's second most-awarded title track in a tie with their 2017 single "Rookie", and was their first song to achieve triple-crown status on all three national television channels, namely Music Bank, Show! Music Core and Inkigayo. The song also achieved two consecutive Melon Weekly Popularity Awards.

=== Awards ===
Awards and nominations for "Psycho"
Year	Organization	Award	Result	Ref.
2020	MTV Video Music Awards	Best K-Pop Video	Nominated	
2020	Melon Music Awards	Best Dance Track (Female)	Nominated	
2020	Mnet Asian Music Awards	Best Dance Performance – Female Group	Nominated	
2020	Mnet Asian Music Awards	Song of the Year	Nominated	
2020	Asian Pop Music Awards	Overseas Song of the Year	Nominated	
2020	Asian Pop Music Awards	Best Overseas Music Video	Won	
2021	Gaon Chart Music Awards	Song of the Month – December 2019	Won	
2021	Golden Disc Awards	Best Digital Song	Won	

Music program awards
Program	Date	Ref.
Music Bank	January 3, 2020	
Music Bank	January 10, 2020	
Music Bank	January 24, 2020	
Show! Music Core	January 4, 2020	
Show! Music Core	January 11, 2020	
Show! Music Core	January 18, 2020	
Inkigayo	January 5, 2020	
Inkigayo	January 12, 2020	
Inkigayo	January 19, 2020	

Melon Popularity Award
Award	Date	Ref.
Weekly Popularity Award	January 6, 2020	
Weekly Popularity Award	January 13, 2020	

== Music video ==
=== Background ===
The accompanying music video for "Psycho" was directed by video director O, whom previously worked on the music video for "Umpah Umpah". The music video for "Psycho" was premiered on December 23, 2019, to coincide with the release of the song and that of Finale. Prior to its premiere date, the music video was teased with a series of short videos showing each group member in a "glam" and "gothic-themed" scenario. The music video was choreographed by Mina Myoung of 1MILLION and Bailey Sok.

=== Synopsis and reception ===
Red Velvet sits on a Victorian gothic-scene set.

The music video for "Psycho" is set in a Victorian Gothic scene. In the video, the members of Red Velvet sing about the alternating moods of a relationship. Following the music video's release, Tamar Herman of Billboard described it as "a modern take: on the elegant, yet festive, flair of flappers with lace and feather looks", praising the video for being "glam". Writer Morin noted the video's "gorgeous A24-esque indie classic" aesthetic. Red Velvet released a performance video for "Psycho" on January 8, 2020, and also released a live performance of the song during a fan-meeting party on January 13 of that year. On March 26, 2020, the music video for the track reached 100 million views on YouTube in 91 days and 7 hours, which is the shortest time in which a Red Velvet video had accrued that many views. By November 17, 2020, the track's music video had gained 200 million views on YouTube, which is the second of the group's videos to reach the 200 million view milestone, achieving it in 10 months and 24 days.

== Credits and personnel ==
Credits adapted from the liner notes of The ReVe Festival: Finale.

Studio

- Recorded at SM SSAM Studio
- Engineered for mix at SM LYVIN Studio
- Mixed at SM Concert Hall Studio
- Mastered at 821 Sound

Personnel

- Red Velvet (Irene, Seulgi, Wendy, Joy, Yeri) – vocals, background vocals
- Kenzie – lyrics, vocal directing
- Andrew "Druski" Scott – composition, arrangement
- Cazzi Opeia – composition, background vocals
- Ejae – composition, background vocals
- Yoo Young-jin – arrangement, music and sound supervisor
- No Min-ji – recording
- Jung Yu-ra – digital editing
- Lee Ji-hong – mixing engineer
- Nam Koong-jin – mixing
- Kwon Nam-woo – mastering

== Charts ==
=== Weekly charts ===
Weekly chart performance
Chart (2019–2020)	Peak position
Hong Kong (HKRIA)	4
Malaysia (RIM)	2
New Zealand Hot Singles (RMNZ)	10
Singapore (RIAS)	1
South Korea (Gaon)	2
South Korea (K-pop Hot 100)	2
UK Indie Breakers (OCC)	9
UK Singles Downloads (Official Charts)	99
UK Singles Sales (OCC)	99
US World Digital Songs (Billboard)	1

=== Monthly charts ===
Monthly chart performance
Chart (2020)	Position
South Korea (Gaon)	3

=== Year-end charts ===
2020 year-end chart performance for "Psycho"
Chart (2020)	Position
South Korea (Gaon)	9

== Certifications ==
Certifications
Region	Certification	Certified units/sales
New Zealand (RMNZ)	Gold	15,000^{‡}
Streaming
South Korea (KMCA)	Platinum	100,000,000^{†}
^{‡} Sales+streaming figures based on certification alone.^{†} Streaming-only figures based on certification alone.

== Release history ==
Release dates and formats
Region	Date	Format	Label	Ref.
Various	December 23, 2019	Digital download; streaming	SM Entertainment; Dreamus	

== Orchestra version ==
On March 29, 2024, SM Classics collaborated with the Seoul Philharmonic Orchestra to release the orchestral version of "Psycho".

== See also ==
- List of number-one songs of 2020 (Singapore)
- List of Music Bank Chart winners (2020)
- List of Show! Music Core Chart winners (2020)
- List of Inkigayo Chart winners (2020)
- List of certified songs in South Korea
