= The ReVe Festival: Day 2 =

- Digital and "Day 2" version cover

EP by Red Velvet
- Released: August 20, 2019
- Studios: SM Studios (Seoul, South Korea)
- Genre: K-pop
- Length: 22:22
- Languages: Korean; English
- Labels: SM; Dreamus

Red Velvet chronology
The ReVe Festival: Day 1 (2019)	The ReVe Festival: Day 2 (2019)	The ReVe Festival: Finale (2019)

Singles from The ReVe Festival: Day 2
- 1. "Umpah Umpah" Released: August 20, 2019

Professional ratings
Review scores
Source	Rating
IZM	3.5/5 stars

The ReVe Festival: Day 2 (occasionally referred as Day 2) is the fourth special extended play and the eleventh overall by South Korean girl group Red Velvet, released on August 20, 2019, through SM Entertainment. The EP was announced on August 12, and it became available to pre-order the same day. This EP is the second release of The ReVe Festival trilogy, with six tracks feature in the EP including the EP's single "Umpah Umpah", which also serves as the second single from The ReVe Festival trilogy.

== Promotion ==
The EP was announced through social media on August 11, 2019, with a teaser image of pink and sandy desert with the logo The ReVe Festival: Day 2.

== Commercial performance ==
The ReVe Festival: Day 2 was a commercial success, debuted atop of Gaon Weekly Album Chart, become the group's tenth number one album on the chart, extended Red Velvet's record as the girl group with most number one albums on the chart. The CD version of the EP debuted on the monthly chart of Gaon Album Chart with 107,554 copies being sold, became the fourth best-selling album of the month August 2019, and also placing at the fifty-first for the year, with 111,654 copies sold. The EP also peaked at number six on the Billboard World Albums Chart.

== Track listing ==
The ReVe Festival: Day 2 track listing
No.	Title	Lyrics	Music	Arrangement	Length
1.	"Umpah Umpah" (Korean: 음파음파; RR: Eumpa eumpa; lit. 'Sonic Wave')	Jeon Gan-di	Christoffer Lauridsen; Andreas Öberg; Allison Kaplan	Christoffer Lauridsen; Andreas Öberg	3:40
2.	"Carpool" (카풀; Kapul)	Kenzie	Sophia Ayana; Léon Paul Palmen; Nathan Cunningham; Marc Sibley	Sophia Ayana; Léon Paul Palmen; Space Primates	3:27
3.	"Love Is the Way" (사랑은 길이다; Sarangeun girida)	Ku Tae-woo; Shin Hye-sun	Ryan S. Jhun; Denzil "DR" Remedios; Nermin Harambašić; Rodnae "Chikk" Bell; Courtney Jenaé Stahl; Charite Viken	Denzil "DR" Remedios	3:32
4.	"Jumpin'"	Kenzie	Kenzie; Daniel Caesar; Ludwig Lindell; Ylva Dimberg	Caesar & Loui	3:36
5.	"Ladies Night"	Park Ji-yeon (MonoTree)	Chu Dae-kwan (MonoTree); Andreas Öberg; Maja Keuc	Chu Dae-kwan (MonoTree)	3:57
6.	"Eyes Locked, Hands Locked" (눈 맞추고, 손 맞대고; Nun matchugo, son matdaego)	Sumin	Sumin	Sumin; Jeong Dong-hwan	4:11
Total length:					22:22

== Charts ==
=== Weekly charts ===
Chart (2019)	Peak position
French Digital Albums (SNEP)	52
Japan Hot Albums (Billboard Japan)	54
Japanese Albums (Oricon)	17
South Korean Albums (Gaon)	1
UK Album Downloads (Official Charts)	51
US Heatseekers Albums (Billboard)	11
US World Albums (Billboard)	6

=== Year-end charts ===
Chart (2019)	Position
South Korean Albums (Gaon)	51

== Release history ==
Region	Date	Format	Label
Various	August 20, 2019	CD; digital download; streaming	SM Entertainment

== See also ==
- The ReVe Festival: Day 1
- The ReVe Festival: Finale
- The ReVe Festival 2022 – Feel My Rhythm
- The ReVe Festival 2022 – Birthday
