= The ReVe Festival 2022 – Feel My Rhythm =

- Digital and "Capriccioso" version cover

EP by Red Velvet
- Released: March 21, 2022
- Length: 20:23
- Languages: Korean; English
- Label: SM

Red Velvet chronology
Queendom (2021)	The ReVe Festival 2022 – Feel My Rhythm (2022)	Bloom (2022)

Singles from The ReVe Festival 2022 – Feel My Rhythm
- 1. "Feel My Rhythm" Released: March 21, 2022

The ReVe Festival 2022 – Feel My Rhythm (occasionally referred just as Feel My Rhythm) is the fifth special extended play and thirteenth overall by South Korean girl group Red Velvet. It was released by SM Entertainment on March 21, 2022, to commemorate the birthday of German Baroque music composer J.S. Bach. It consists of six tracks, including the lead single "Feel My Rhythm", in three physical versions, two "ReVe" versions with different covers and the "Orgel" version.

The ReVe Festival 2022 – Feel My Rhythm received positive reviews from music critics. Commercially, it peaked at number one on the Gaon Weekly Album Chart, becoming the group's twelfth number-one album and extending the group's record as the girl group with the most number-one albums on the chart. As of April 2022, the EP sold 653,610 copies on the Gaon Chart, making the EP the group's best-selling physical release of their career. It was also certified double platinum by the Korea Music Content Association (KMCA).

== Background and release ==
Red Velvet first hinted they would be making a comeback at SM Entertainment's New Year's concert, SM Town Live 2022. On February 18, 2022, an official from their label revealed that the group was preparing an album and aiming for a March release. Before the group's comeback, they were initially scheduled to hold a special live concert called 2022 The ReVe Festival: Prologue at the SK Handball Stadium in Seoul Olympic Park from March 19–20; however, the event was postponed when members Irene, Joy, and Yeri tested positive for COVID-19 on March 14. The EP's title is a continuation of and sequel to the group's music festival concept, The ReVe Festival, after which they named three releases in 2019. "ReVe" takes its name from Red Velvet and the word for "dream" and "fantasy" in French.

On March 2, the title of the group's EP, The ReVe Festival 2022 – Feel My Rhythm, was announced. Its physical release comes in two "ReVe" versions of different designs and the "Orgel" version. The EP features six songs in a variety of genres, including lead single "Feel My Rhythm". By March 7, a schedule poster was released through the group's various social media accounts, containing a variety of content release schedules related to the EP. Starting on March 8, teaser images of the group were sequentially released. The EP itself was released on March 21.

== Composition ==
"Feel My Rhythm" is a dance-pop song incorporating "intense trap beats" and "string-like melodies", including a sample of the Bach arrangement "Air on the G String". The lyrics vividly unravel the journey to enjoy freely through time and space along with the song. "Rainbow Halo" is an R&B and dance-pop song featuring "restrained" clap sounds and a "subtle" bell sound over a "groovy" bass along with Red Velvet's "languid" and "dreamy" vocals. "Beg for Me" is another R&B and dance-pop song with "chic" vocals.

"Bamboleo" is a retro city pop song with a "rhythmic" bass and electronic guitar combined with "dreamy" synth sounds. Like the title, which means "shaking" in Spanish, the lyrics talk about dancing all night. "Good, Bad, Ugly" is a mid-tempo R&B song including a rhythmic brass sound over a "groovy" shuffle rhythm and a "sensuous" chord progression. The lyrics liken life's unpredictable moments to "choosing one of the numerous chocolates in a box". "In My Dreams" is a slow R&B ballad with "minimal trap rhythms" and the sound of a music box at the beginning and end. The lyrics express a desire to be together with the person you love forever, even in dreams.

== Reception ==
Professional ratings
Review scores
Source	Rating
Beats per Minute	78%
IZM	2.5/5 stars
NME	3/5 stars
Pitchfork	7.4/10
The Harvard Crimson	4.5/5 stars

The ReVe Festival 2022 – Feel My Rhythm received positive reviews from music critics. Chase McMullen of Beats per Minute said it "finds Red Velvet showing off just about every side of their artistry, confidently swinging big right in the directions they know serve them best". Zhenzhen Yu writing for Pitchfork called the EP "refined, verdant dance-pop better suited for springtime", and that it "stirs awake from complacency and reinstates the group's regality without compromising their principles". On the mixed side, Tanu I. Raj of NME said it "feels considerably substandard, if only because of its repetitive flavors and unimaginative spins on genres".

By March 20, 2022, it was reported that The ReVe Festival 2022 – Feel My Rhythm accumulated 516,866 total pre-orders, a career high for Red Velvet, making them a half-million seller. The EP debuted at number two on the Gaon Weekly Album Chart in the chart issue dated March 20–26, 2022, before peaking at number one in the chart issue dated April 10–16, 2022, becoming the group's twelfth number-one album and extending the group's record as the girl group with the most number-one albums on the chart. As of April 2022, the EP sold 653,610 copies on the Gaon Chart, making the EP the group's best-selling physical release of their career. It was also certified double platinum by the Korea Music Content Association (KMCA) for selling over 500,000 copies.

== Accolades ==
Awards and nominations
Organization	Year	Category	Result	Ref.
Genie Music Awards	2022	Album of the Year	Nominated	

== Track listing ==
The ReVe Festival 2022 – Feel My Rhythm track listing
No.	Title	Lyrics	Music	Arrangement	Length
1.	"Feel My Rhythm"	Seo Ji-eum	Jake K (Artiffect); Maria Marcus; Andreas Öberg; MCK (Artiffect)	Artiffect	3:30
2.	"Rainbow Halo"	Seo Ji-eum	Harvey Mason Jr.; Michael "R!ot" Wyckoff; Patrick "J. Que" Smith; Britt Burton; Deez	Harvey Mason Jr.; Michael "R!ot" Wyckoff	3:28
3.	"Beg for Me"	Jo Yoon-kyung	Josefin Glenmark; Gavin Jones; Ludwig Lindell	Ludwig Lindell	3:32
4.	"Bamboleo"	Cha Yu-bin (Verygoods)	Jake K (Artiffect); Maria Marcus; Andreas Öberg; MCK (Artiffect)	Artiffect	3:28
5.	"Good, Bad, Ugly"	Danke (Lalala Studio)	Park Geun-tae; MinGtion; Sophia Pae	MinGtion	3:01
6.	"In My Dreams"	Kim Su-ji (Lalala Studio)	Alma Goodman; Alida Garpestad Peck; Kristoffer Tømmerbakke; Erik Smaaland	Kristoffer Tømmerbakke; Erik Smaaland	3:24
Total length:					20:23

Notes

- "Feel My Rhythm" samples the Johann Sebastian Bach arrangement "Air on the G String".

== Charts ==
=== Weekly charts ===
Weekly chart performance
Chart (2022)	Peak position
Australian Digital Albums (ARIA)	10
Australian Hitseekers Albums (ARIA)	6
Belgian Albums (Ultratop Flanders)	138
Japanese Albums (Oricon)	6
Japanese Combined Albums (Oricon)	8
Japanese Hot Albums (Billboard Japan)	4
South Korean Albums (Gaon)	1
UK Album Downloads (Official Charts)	26
US Heatseekers Albums (Billboard)	9
US World Albums (Billboard)	8

=== Monthly charts ===
Monthly chart performance
Chart (2022)	Peak position
Japanese Albums (Oricon)	21
South Korean Albums (Gaon)	3

=== Year-end charts ===
Year-end chart performance
Chart (2022)	Position
South Korean Albums (Circle)	27

== Certifications and sales ==
Certifications and sales
Region	Certification	Certified units/sales
South Korea (KMCA)	2× Platinum	694,304

== Release history ==
Release history
Region	Date	Format(s)	Label(s)	Ref.
Various	March 21, 2022	CD; digital download; streaming	SM	

== See also ==
- The ReVe Festival: Day 1
- The ReVe Festival: Day 2
- The ReVe Festival: Finale
- The ReVe Festival 2022 – Birthday
