= Feel My Rhythm =

2022 song by Red Velvet

Single by Red Velvet

from the EP The ReVe Festival 2022 – Feel My Rhythm
- Language: Korean
- Released: March 21, 2022
- Genre: Dance-pop
- Length: 3:30
- Label: SM
- Composers: Jake K; Maria Marcus; Andreas Öberg; MCK
- Lyricist: Seo Ji-eum

Red Velvet singles chronology
"Queendom" (2021)	"Feel My Rhythm" (2022)	"Wildside" (2022)

Music video
- "Feel My Rhythm" on YouTube

"Feel My Rhythm" is a song recorded by South Korean girl group Red Velvet for their extended play The ReVe Festival 2022 – Feel My Rhythm (2022). Written by Seo Ji-eum and composed by various contributors, including Andreas Öberg, the song was released as the lead single of the extended play (EP) on March 21, 2022, through SM Entertainment, along with an accompanying music video.

== Background and release ==
Seven months after Red Velvet released their sixth EP Queendom, it was reported that the group was preparing new music. On February 18, 2022, SM Entertainment announced that the group would be releasing a new album the following month. The title of the EP, The ReVe Festival 2022 – Feel My Rhythm, was confirmed on March 2. "Feel My Rhythm" was set for official digital release on March 21, 2022, along with the EP. On March 18, the music video teaser was released; the 30-second clip opens with the melody of Bach's "Air on the G String" as dancers dressed in "creepy" bird-inspired outfits waltz around the group. The dark scene features psychedelic references and classical music in the background. The music video for the song was also inspired by the said piece and produced in the form of an opera that pays homage to famous artwork, including The Swing, Ophelia, and The Garden of Earthly Delights.

== Composition ==
"Feel My Rhythm"
An 18-second sample of "Feel My Rhythm", showing a sample of Bach's "Air on the G String" and a characteristic combination of modern pop and classical music.

"Feel My Rhythm" was written by Seo Ji-eum and composed by Jake K, Maria Marcus, MCK and Swedish composer Andreas Öberg. Musically, it is a dance-pop song that samples Bach's "Air on the G String", featuring "delicate" and "elegant" string melodies, "intense" trap beats, and "fantastic" vocal charm. The song draws inspiration from Bach and ballet, blending modern pop sensibilities with classical music. It was composed in the key of C-sharp major, with a tempo of 158 beats per minute, while the lyrics vividly unravel one's journey to enjoy themselves freely through time and space along with the song.

== Commercial performance ==
"Feel My Rhythm" debuted and peaked at number three on South Korea's Gaon Digital Chart in the chart issue dated March 20–26, 2022. Additionally, it debuted at number 21 on the Billboard K-pop Hot 100 in the chart issue dated April 2, 2022, peaking at number three in the chart issued a week later. In Japan, the song debuted and peaked at number 47 on the Billboard Japan Japan Hot 100 in the chart issue dated March 30, 2022. The song also debuted and peaked at number 41 on the Oricon Combined Singles Chart in the chart issue dated April 4, 2022. In Hong Kong, the song debuted at number 18 on the Hong Kong Songs chart in the chart issue dated April 2, 2022, peaking at number 12 in the chart issued a week later. In Taiwan, the song debuted at number 23 on the Taiwan Songs chart in the chart issue dated April 2, 2022, peaking at number 16 in the chart issued a week later.

In Indonesia, the song debuted at number eight on the Indonesia Songs chart in the chart issue dated April 2, 2022, peaking at number three in the chart issued a week later. In Malaysia, the song debuted at number 15 on RIM's Top 20 Most Streamed International Singles in the chart issue dated March 18–24, 2022, peaking at number five in the chart issued a week later. Additionally, the song debuted at number 10 on the Malaysia Songs chart in the chart issue dated April 2, 2022, peaking at number five in the chart issued a week later. In the Philippines, the song debuted at number 16 on the Philippine Songs chart in the chart issue dated April 2, 2022, peaking at number 15 in the chart issued a week later. In Singapore, the song debuted at number 21 on the RIAS's Top Streaming Chart in the chart issue dated March 18–24, 2022, peaking at number six in the chart issued a week later. It also debuted at number seven on the RIAS Top Regional Chart in the chart issue dated March 18–24, 2022, peaking at number one in the chart issued a week later. Additionally, it debuted at number 21 on the Singapore Songs chart in the chart issue dated April 2, 2022, peaking at number nine in the chart issued a week later. In Vietnam, the song debuted at number eight on the Billboard Vietnam Vietnam Hot 100 in the chart issue dated March 31, 2022, peaking at number six in the chart issued a week later. In New Zealand, the song debuted at number 24 on RMNZ Hot Singles in the chart issue dated March 28, 2022.

In the United States, the song debuted at number five on the Billboard World Digital Song Sales in the chart issue dated April 2, 2022. Globally, the song debuted at number 61 on the Billboard Global 200 in the chart issue dated April 2, 2022, peaking at number 36 in the chart issued a week later. It also debuted at number 37 on the Billboard Global Excl. US in the chart issue dated April 2, 2022, peaking at number 20 in the chart issued a week later. Additionally, the song debuted at number 16 on the Billboard Hot Trending Songs in the chart issue dated April 9, 2022.

== Promotion ==
Prior to the extended play's release, on March 21, 2022, Red Velvet held a live event called "The ReVe Festival 2022 – Feel My Rhythm Countdown Live" on YouTube to introduce the extended play and its songs, including "Feel My Rhythm".

== Accolades ==
"Feel My Rhythm" received a music program award on Music Bank on April 1, 2022.

Awards and nominations for "Feel My Rhythm"
Organization	Year	Category	Result	Ref.
Asian Pop Music Awards	2022	Record of the Year	Won	
Asian Pop Music Awards	2022	Best Music Video	Won	
Genie Music Awards	2022	Best Music Video	Won	
Genie Music Awards	2022	Song of the Year	Nominated	
Golden Disc Awards	2023	Digital Song Bonsang	Nominated	
Korean Music Awards	2023	Best Kpop Song	Nominated	
MAMA Awards	2022	Best Dance Performance Female Group	Nominated	
MAMA Awards	2022	Song of the Year	Longlisted	

== Credits and personnel ==
Credits adapted from the liner notes of The ReVe Festival 2022 – Feel My Rhythm.

Studio

- SM SSAM Studio – recording, digital editing
- SM Yellow Tail Studio – recording
- Sound Pool Studios – digital editing
- SM Blue Cup Studio – mixing

Personnel

- Red Velvet (Irene, Seulgi, Wendy, Joy, Yeri) – vocals, background vocals
- Seo Ji-eum – Korean lyrics
- Jake K (ARTiffect) – composition, arrangement, directing, drum, bass, guitar, piano, synthesizer, MIDI string
- Maria Marcus – composition, background vocals
- Andreas Öberg – composition
- MCK (ARTiffect) – composition, arrangement, drum, bass, guitar, piano, synthesizer, MIDI string
- Johann Sebastian Bach – original writer
- Kang Eun-ji – recording, digital editing
- Noh Min-ji – recording
- Jeong Ho-jin – digital editing
- Jeong Eui-seok – mixing

== Charts ==
=== Weekly charts ===
Weekly chart performance
Chart (2022)	Peak position
Global 200 (Billboard)	36
Hong Kong (Billboard)	12
Indonesia (Billboard)	3
Japan Hot 100 (Billboard)	47
Japan (Oricon Combined Singles)	41
Malaysia (Billboard)	5
Malaysia International (RIM)	5
New Zealand Hot Singles (RMNZ)	24
Philippines (Billboard)	15
Singapore (Billboard)	9
Singapore (RIAS)	6
South Korea (Circle)	3
South Korea (K-pop Hot 100)	3
Taiwan (Billboard)	16
US World Digital Song Sales (Billboard)	8
Vietnam (Vietnam Hot 100)	6

=== Monthly charts ===
Monthly chart performance
Chart (2022)	Position
South Korea (Gaon)	3

=== Year-end charts ===
Year-end chart performance
Chart (2022)	Position
South Korea (Circle)	11
Chart (2023)	Position
South Korea (Circle)	139

== Certifications ==
Streaming certifications for "Feel My Rhythm"
Region	Certification	Certified units/sales
South Korea (KMCA)	Platinum	100,000,000^{†}
^{†} Streaming-only figures based on certification alone.

== Release history ==
Release dates and formats
Region	Date	Format(s)	Label(s)	Ref.
Various	March 21, 2022	Digital download; streaming	SM	

== Orchestra version ==
"Feel My Rhythm"

Single by Seoul Philharmonic Orchestra
- Released: July 1, 2022
- Genre: Orchestra
- Length: 4:18
- Label: SM Classics
- Songwriters: Jake K; Maria Marcus; Andreas Öberg; MCK
- Producer: Lee Soo-man

Music video
- "Feel My Rhythm" on YouTube

SM Classics collaborated with Seoul Philharmonic Orchestra to release the orchestral version of "Feel My Rhythm" on July 1, 2022, alongside the accompanying music video directed by Min Ko-un. This version is the second orchestra re-arrangement of Red Velvet's song after "Red Flavor".

Initially a standalone single, the orchestral version of "Feel My Rhythm" was later included on SM Classics' debut album, Across the New World, released on January 25, 2025.

=== Track listing ===
Digital download and streaming

1. "Feel My Rhythm (Orchestra version)" – 4:18

=== Personnel ===
Credits adapted from Melon.

Studio

- Seoul Studio – recording
- SM Concert Hall Studio – mixing
- 821 Sound Mastering – mastering

Personnel

- Lee Soo-man – production
- Yoo Young-jin – supervision
- Moon Jung-jae – piano, recording director
- Chae Jung-hee – artists and repertoire
- Lee Jong-han – background instrument
- Jo In-woo – arrangement
- Lee Gwang-il – arrangement
- Min Ko-un – arrangement
- David Lee – conductor
- Nam Gung-jin – mixing
- Kwon Nam-woo – mastering

== See also ==
- List of Music Bank Chart winners (2022)
