= Birthday (Red Velvet song) =

Single by Red Velvet

from the EP The ReVe Festival 2022 – Birthday
- Language: Korean
- Released: November 28, 2022
- Genre: Dance-pop
- Length: 3:36
- Label: SM; Dreamus
- Composers: Ejae; Kole; Issac Han; Aaron Kim; Ghostchild Ltd; Loosen Door
- Lyricist: Kim Min-ji

Red Velvet singles chronology
"Wildside" (2022)	"Birthday" (2022)	"Beautiful Christmas" (2022)

Music video
- "Birthday" on YouTube

"Birthday" is a song recorded by South Korean girl group Red Velvet for their sixth special extended play The ReVe Festival 2022 – Birthday. Written by Ejae, Kole, Issac Han, Aaron Kim, Ghostchild Ltd and Loosen Door, it was released as the EP's lead single by SM Entertainment on November 28, 2022.

== Background and release ==
On October 28, 2022, SM Entertainment announced Red Velvet would be releasing a new album in November 2022. On November 7, it was announced the group will be releasing their sixth special extended play titled The ReVe Festival 2022 – Birthday, alongside the lead single "Birthday", on November 28. On November 27, the music video teaser was released. The song was released alongside its music video and the EP on November 28.

== Composition ==
"Birthday" was written by Kim Min-ji of Jam Factory, composed by Ejae, Kole, Issac Han, Aaron Kim, Ghostchild Ltd, and Loosen Door, and arranged by the latter four. It was described a dance-pop song that samples George Gershwin's composition Rhapsody in Blue, featuring R&B, trap, drum, and synth rhythm with lyrics about "returning to the birthday of the person you like and making all of your dreams come true, giving yourself a day to remember". "Birthday" was composed in the key of B-flat minor, with a tempo of 150 beats per minute.

== Music video ==
The "whimsical" music video directed by Kim Hyun-soo of Segaji was released alongside the song by SM Entertainment on November 28, 2022. It portrays Red Velvet's members "being transported into a kaleidoscopic imaginary world constructed from giant pieces of chocolate and candy" where each members "has their own surreal world" with scenes that switches "[imaginary world] where Seulgi performs with traditional Korean lion dancer" to "another [world] where Wendy sings in a garden modelled after a chessboard".

== Commercial performance ==
"Birthday" debuted at number 23 on South Korea's Circle Digital Chart in the chart issue dated November 27 – December 3, 2022. The song also debuted at number 14 on the Billboard South Korea Songs in the chart issue dated December 10, 2022.

== Promotion ==
Prior to the release of The ReVe Festival 2022 – Birthday, on November 28, 2022, the group held a live event on YouTube and TikTok to introduce the EP and its song, including "Birthday", and to communicate with their fans. They subsequently performed on three music programs in the first week: KBS's Music Bank on December 2, MBC's Show! Music Core on December 3, and SBS's Inkigayo on December 4. On the second week, they performed on Music Bank on December 9, Show! Music Core on December 10, and Inkigayo on December 11.

== Accolades ==
"Birthday" won two music program awards on Show Champion on December 7 and 14, 2022. It received a nomination for Song of the Year – November at the 2023 Circle Chart Music Awards.

== Credits and personnel ==
Credits adapted from the liner notes of The ReVe Festival 2022 – Birthday.

Studio

- SM Big Shot Studio – recording
- SM Yellow Tail Studio – recording
- SM Ssam Studio – recording
- SM Blue Ocean Studio – mixing
- SM Lvyin Studio – digital editing
- 821 Sound Mastering – mastering

Personnel

- SM Entertainment – executive producer
- Lee Soo-man – producer
- Lee Sung-soo – production director, executive supervisor
- Tak Young-joon – executive supervisor
- Yoo Young-jin – music and sound supervisor
- Red Velvet (Irene, Seulgi, Wendy, Joy, Yeri) – vocals, background vocals
- Ejae – background vocals, composition
- Kim Min-ji – lyrics
- Nicole Cohen a.k.a. Kole – composition
- Isaac Han – composition, arrangement
- Aaron Kim – composition, arrangement
- Ghostchild Ltd – composition, arrangement
- Loosen Door – composition, arrangement
- MinGtion – vocal directing
- Lee Min-kyu – recording
- Noh Min-ji – recording
- Kang Eun-ji – recording
- Kim Chul-soon – mixing
- Lee Ji-hong – digital editing
- Kwon Nam-woo – mastering

== Charts ==
=== Weekly charts ===
Weekly chart performance for "Birthday"
Chart (2022)	Peak position
South Korea (Circle)	23

=== Monthly charts ===
Monthly chart performance for "Birthday"
Chart (2022)	Peak position
South Korea (Circle)	74

== Release history ==
Release history for "Birthday"
Region	Date	Format	Label
Various	November 28, 2022	Digital download; streaming	SM; Dreamus
