= Umpah Umpah =

2019 single by Red Velvet

Single by Red Velvet

from the EP The ReVe Festival: Day 2
- Language: Korean
- Released: August 20, 2019
- Recorded: 2019
- Studio: SM Studio Center, Seoul, South Korea
- Genre: Nu-disco; electropop
- Length: 3:40
- Label: SM; Dreamus
- Composers: Christoffer Lauridsen; Andreas Öberg; Allison Kaplan
- Lyricist: Jeon Gan-di

Red Velvet singles chronology
| "Zimzalabim" (2019) | "Umpah Umpah" (2019) | "Psycho" (2019) |

Music video
- "Umpah Umpah" on YouTube

"Umpah Umpah" (Korean: 음파음파; RR: Eumpa eumpa; lit. 'Sonic Wave') is a song recorded by South Korean girl group Red Velvet for their seventh (ninth overall) Korean extended play (EP) The ReVe Festival: Day 2, which serves as the second installment of the group's The ReVe Festival album trilogy. The song, alongside its vacation-themed music video, was released on August 20, 2019, as the lead single from Day 2. Written by Jeon Gan-di and composed by Christoffer Lauridsen, Andreas Öberg and Allison Kaplan, "Umpah Umpah" is described as "an uptempo dance song with disco house rhythms", with the group's "lovely and cool vocals doubling the freshness". The songwriting, which includes swimming motifs, portrays somebody falling in love with the eyes and charms of the girls, using the phrase "umpah umpah" as if their love interest was learning how to control their breathing while swimming.

Upon its release, "Umpah Umpah" received positive reviews from music critics for its bright, upbeat sound while some felt it was a "safe" return to the public-friendly sound of the group. Commercially, the song achieved moderate success in South Korea, peaking at number 18 on the Gaon Digital Chart while extending the group's consecutive top-ten string on Billboard World Digital Songs chart to 15, peaking at number nine. It also topped the Billboard K-pop Hot 100, becoming the group's second number-one single on the chart.

== Background and release ==
Following the release of The ReVe Festival: Day 1 on June 19, 2019, several fans spotted hints for the group's next installment via clue tickets provided in the album's package, one of which mentioned the phrase "Umpah Umpah". Shortly after the group's five-year anniversary in early August 2019, it was reported that the girls would "make a speedy comeback", which was quickly confirmed by their label on the same day. On August 12, the group released an introduction video for The ReVe Festival: Day 2, which included a snippet from an then-unknown title track, which was later confirmed to be "Umpah Umpah". After a string of promotional photo teasers for each member, the music video for the song was released on August 20, 2019, at midnight KST (UTC+09:00), 18 hours ahead of the EP's digital release.

== Composition ==
"Umpah Umpah"
"Umpah Umpah" is described as an "uptempo dance song with disco house rhythms", combined with the group's "lovely and cool" vocals which "doubled the freshness".

"Umpah Umpah" was composed by Jeon Gan-di, while the production was handled by Andreas Öberg, Christoffer Lauridsen and Allison Kaplan, the former of whom produced the group's single "One of These Nights" (2016) and Japanese single "Sappy". It was composed in the key of G major with a tempo of 120 beats per minute, and is the group's seventh single under the "Red" sonic concept and their third single with a summer-inspired concept. Musically, the song was described as an "uptempo dance song with disco house rhythms", with the group's "lovely and cool" vocals "doubling the freshness".

Lyrically, "Umpah Umpah" sees Red Velvet telling their love interest, who fell in love with the eyes and charms of the girls, how to "breathe normally", using the phrase "umpah umpah" as if their love interest was learning how to control their breathing while swimming. The rap section in the song's second verse references several of the group's past singles, such as "Happiness" (2014), "Ice Cream Cake" (2015), "Dumb Dumb" (2015), and "Red Flavor" (2017).

== Critical reception ==
"Umpah Umpah" was met with positive reviews from music critics. Kirsten Spruch of Billboard magazine viewed the track as "outlandish", and praised its "explosive chorus combined with glistening instrumentation and infectious melodies and ad libs". The Korea Times described the song as "a bright, energizing disco number laced electric sound rhythms, whose lyrics draw on summer images like deep waters and ice cream". Moreover, writer Justine Shaffer of SnackFever magazine described the song as "a sound that's a twist back to the summertime pop perfection vibes". Gallup Korea ranked the song at number eight on their list of the Best Songs of 2019, and was additionally at ranked number 47 on SBS PopAsia's list of Top 100 Asian Pop Songs of the year, describing "Umpah Umpah" as an "onomatopoeic earworm".

== Accolades ==
"Umpah Umpah" won the Song of the Year award at the 4th Asia Artist Awards on November 26, 2019. The song also received six music program wins.

Awards and nominations for "Umpah Umpah"
| Year | Organization | Award | Result | Ref. |
|---|---|---|---|---|
| 2019 | Asia Artist Awards | Song of the Year | Won | |
| 2020 | Gaon Chart Music Awards | Song of the Month – August 2019 | Nominated | |

Music program awards
| Program | Date | Ref. |
|---|---|---|
| The Show | August 27, 2019 | |
| Show Champion | August 28, 2019 | |
| M Countdown | August 29, 2019 | |
| Music Bank | August 30, 2019 | |
| Show! Music Core | August 31, 2019 | |
| Inkigayo | September 1, 2019 | |

== Commercial performance ==
"Umpah Umpah" debuted at number 18 on the Gaon Digital Chart, where it peaked for two weeks. It was later ranked at number 185 on the year-end Gaon Digital Chart for 2019. The song performed better on the Billboard K-pop Hot 100, debuting at number 19, and subsequently attained the top spot on the chart for two consecutive weeks. It became the group's second number-one single on the chart, following "Power Up" (2018), and their seventh consecutive top 10 single since the chart's re-establishment in December 2017. Additionally, the song debuted at number nine on the US World Digital Song Sales chart, thus extending their consecutive top 10 string to 15 entries on the chart.

== Music video ==
=== Background ===
The music video is set in a cartoonish beach house, where an incoming thunderstorm sends them running indoors.

On August 12, 2019, the first video teaser for the music video, titled "Road Trip: RVF Day 2 D-7", was uploaded to Red Velvet's official YouTube channel. A series of promotional photo teasers featuring the group members, along with a highlight video showcasing the song's pre-chorus was subsequently unveiled. A final video teaser was uploaded on August 19, and the music video for "Umpah Umpah" was released on the following day.

=== Synopsis and reception ===
The music video is set in a cartoonish beach house, where they shelter from an incoming thunderstorm. There, they played magical board games and dance on a rainy rooftop. The song featured several references to Red Velvet's previous singles, including "Dumb Dumb", "Red Flavor", "Ice Cream Cake" and "Happiness". Following the music video's release, writer Pakkee Tan of E! described it as "a fun, frenetic, pop-electro number that evokes sunny days by the beach with a bunch of your best friends", further praising the video for being "wonderfully off-beat and delightful, as always". Puah Ziwei of NME noted its "fun-filled" nature and "the vibrant, feel-good" elements" of the music video. The group later released a dance practice video for "Umpah Umpah" on August 29, 2019.

== Live performances ==
Following the release of the single, Red Velvet appeared and performed on several South Korean music programs, including The Show, Show! Music Core, Music Bank, and Inkigayo. On November 26, 2019, Red Velvet performed the song at the annual Asia Artist Awards at Mỹ Đình National Stadium in Hanoi, Vietnam, and marked the group's first performance of the single at an award show.

== Credits and personnel ==
Credits adapted from the liner notes of The ReVe Festival: Day 2.

Studio

- Recorded and engineered for mix at SM LYVIN Studio
- Recorded at SM SSAM Studio
- Mixed at SM Blue Cup Studio

Personnel

- Red Velvet (Irene, Seulgi, Wendy, Joy, Yeri) – vocals, background vocals
- Jeon Gan-di – Korean songwriting
- Christoffer Lauridsen – composition, arrangement
- Andreas Öberg – composition, arrangement, guitar
- Allison Kaplan – composition, background vocals
- ButterFly – vocal directing, Pro Tools operation, digital editing
- Seo Mi-rae – background vocals
- Hwang Seong-je – background vocals
- Lee Ji-hong – recording, mixing engineer
- Noh Min-ji – recording
- Jeong Eui-seok – mixing

== Charts ==
=== Weekly charts ===
Weekly chart performance
| Chart (2019) | Peak position |
|---|---|
| South Korea (Gaon) | 18 |
| South Korea (K-pop Hot 100) | 1 |
| US World Digital Songs (Billboard) | 9 |

=== Monthly charts ===
Monthly chart performance
| Chart (2019) | Position |
|---|---|
| South Korea (Gaon) | 34 |

=== Year-end charts ===
2019 year-end charts for "Umpah Umpah"
| Chart (2019) | Position |
|---|---|
| South Korea (Gaon) | 185 |

== Release history ==
Release dates and formats
| Region | Date | Format | Label | Ref. |
|---|---|---|---|---|
| Various | August 20, 2019 | Digital download; streaming | SM Entertainment; Dreamus | |

== See also ==
- List of M Countdown Chart winners (2019)
- List of Inkigayo Chart winners (2019)
