= The ReVe Festival: Finale =

- Digital and "Finale" version cover

Compilation album by Red Velvet
- Released: December 23, 2019
- Studios: SM Studios (Seoul, South Korea)
- Genres: Pop; R&B
- Length: 55:35
- Languages: Korean; English
- Labels: SM; Dreamus
- Producers: Druski; Yoo Young-jin; Moonshine; Royal Dive; Sumin; Jeong Dong-hwan; Chu Dae-kwan (MonoTree); Caesar & Loui; Denzil "DR" Remedios; Sophia Ayana; Léon Paul Palmen; Space Primates; Christoffer Lauridsen; Andreas Öberg; Ryan S. Jhun; Hitmanic; DeKo; PJ; Trinity Music; Will Simms; Ylva Dimberg; Neil Athale; Ollipop; Simon Petrén

Red Velvet chronology
The ReVe Festival: Day 2 (2019)	The ReVe Festival: Finale (2019)	Queendom (2021)

Singles from The ReVe Festival: Finale
- 1. "Psycho" Released: December 23, 2019

The ReVe Festival: Finale (sometimes simply referred as Finale) is the first Korean-language compilation album by South Korean girl group Red Velvet. The album was announced and became available to pre-order on December 12, 2019, before being released by SM Entertainment on December 23, 2019, with Dreamus serving as the South Korea distributor. As the third and final release of the group's trilogy The ReVe Festival, the set contains all twelve tracks taken from two previous extended plays The ReVe Festival: Day 1 and The ReVe Festival: Day 2. With SM founder Lee Soo-man serving as the executive producer, Finale includes four new songs—"Psycho", "In & Out", "Remember Forever", and a previously unreleased "La Rouge", with the first being the lead single for the album (and subsequently the third and final single from the trilogy). The album was released in two versions with different packaging artwork, while a digital EP including only the four new tracks was also released on the same date.

Upon its release, the compilation album became a commercial success both domestically and internationally. It was Red Velvet's eleventh chart-topper on the Gaon Album Chart—for two weeks, and tenth top-three entry on the Billboard World Albums Chart. It was also the group's first release to enter several European albums charts, namely in Spain, Poland, and Belgium. The lead single "Psycho" was also a commercial and critical success, becoming the group's highest-charting single since "Power Up" and their second chart-topper on the Billboard World Digital Songs chart, following "RBB (Really Bad Boy)" in late 2018.

== Background and release ==
During the group's appearance on Idol League in July 2019, Irene confirmed that their future plans for 2019 would include two more installments of The ReVe Festival trilogy, namely Day 2 (which was later released on August 20) and Finale. The group then performed their first two nights for the third concert, titled "La Rouge" at the Korea University Hwa-jeong Tiger Dome, Seoul in November 2019, where they debuted an exclusive new track for the concert, initially known as "Shining." The album was then announced through social media on midnight of December 12, 2019, with movie-poster style teaser photos with tagline; "Don't be afraid of the dark. The fireworks will light up the sky" and "Stay in the magic even after dark. The fireworks start". The tracklist was also revealed on midnight of December 15, 2019, revealing the title of four new tracks, namely "Psycho", "In & Out", "Remember Forever" and "La Rouge", with the latter being previously known as "Shining." It was then released on December 23, 2019, to coincide with the music video premiere for "Psycho." While the physical version contains two different package editions with sixteen songs in its tracklist, the digital version is an extended play only with the four new tracks.

== Composition ==
The album contains a total of sixteen tracks, with twelve of which were taken from the group's first two installations from the trilogy in the same year. The lead single "Psycho" is an R&B track with trap and future bass influence, starting with a "grandiose operatic" instrumental intro, followed by "dramatic" pizzicato strings, "classical" chords and "trap beats, squelching synths" elements, which marked the song as their seventh single to fall under the "Velvet" concept. The lyrics were written by songwriter Kenzie, while its composition was handled by songwriters Andrew Scott, Cazzi Opeia, and Ejae, with arrangement by Scott and Yoo Young-jin. It was proceeded by "In & Out", a "creeping, standout" synth-pop track which was also co-written by Kenzie and Opeia, the latter whom co-produced the song with production team Moonshine. The third track "Remember Forever" is a "sweet" R&B and doo-wop ballad, while the last track "La Rouge" is a "jazzy" showtune, which contains elements from jazz and funk music. The track was written and produced by Andreas Öberg, Simon Petrén, Maja Keuc, Hwang Chan-hee, and Hong So-jin, with the former whom co-produced the group's previous single "Umpah Umpah" (2019).

== Tour and live performances ==
Following the group's early performance for "La Rouge" during their eponymous third concert in November 2019, Red Velvet gave their first live performance for "Psycho" and "Remember Forever" at the ReVe Festival FINALE Party on December 22, 2019, which premiered exclusively on V Live with a limited participation for the group's fandom. The group originally planned to perform the lead single live during their attendance at SBS Gayo Daejeon on December 25, however, as fellow member Wendy suffered injuries during rehearsal, a pre-recorded performance was aired instead, which eventually led to the group having to perform as a quartet for their later attendance. The remaining four members eventually covered all Wendy's singing parts for their live performance at the 29th Seoul Music Awards on January 30, 2020, where they also won their fifth consecutive Main Award (Bonsang).

== Commercial performance ==
Upon its release, The ReVe Festival: Finale was a domestic commercial success for Red Velvet, debuting atop the Gaon Album Chart and topping the chart for two consecutive weeks. Not only is Finale the group's first to stay atop the chart more than one week, the album extended their record as the K-pop girl group with more number-one titles on the chart, having achieved a total of eleven chart-toppers. With only one tracking week in December 2019, the album was the third best-selling entry for the December issue of the monthly Gaon Album Chart, and subsequently the fifty-seventh best-selling album of 2019. As of February 2021, it has sold 174,523 copies. The album later being certified Platinum by Circle Chart, then Gaon Chart, in June 2022, for selling more than 250,000 copies. And has since exceed 400,000 copies sold as of September 2022, making the album Red Velvet's second best-selling album.

Additionally, the album peaked at number three on the Billboard World Albums Chart, becoming the group's milestone tenth top five album on the chart and to date, their second release to stay on the chart for at least ten weeks, following Day 2 which spent a total of thirteen charting weeks. It also entered the Billboard Tastemakers Albums chart at number three, making Red Velvet the first K-pop girl group and fourth group overall to enter the chart. The album continued to achieve success in several component Europe albums charts, being the group's first entry on Spanish Albums Chart, Polish Albums Chart and Belgium Ultratop Albums Chart, respectively.

== Track listing ==
The ReVe Festival: Finale – standard edition
No.	Title	Lyrics	Music	Arrangement	Length
1.	"Psycho"	Kenzie	Andrew "Druski" Scott; Cazzi Opeia; Ejae	Druski; Yoo Young-jin	3:31
2.	"In & Out"	Kenzie	Kenzie; Jonatan Gusmark; Ludvig Evers; Cazzi Opeia	Moonshine	3:13
3.	"Remember Forever"	Lee Seu-ran; Jang Yeo-jin (Lalala Studio)	Louise Frick Sveen; Jeon Byung-sun (Royal Dive); Hong Young-in (Royal Dive)	Royal Dive	3:08
4.	"Eyes Locked, Hands Locked" (눈 맞추고, 손 맞대고; Nun Matchugo, Son Matdaego)	Sumin	Sumin	Sumin; Jeong Dong-hwan	4:11
5.	"Ladies Night"	Park Ji-yeon (MonoTree)	Chu Dae-kwan (MonoTree); Andreas Öberg; Maja Keuc	Chu Dae-kwan (MonoTree)	3:57
6.	"Jumpin'"	Kenzie	Kenzie; Daniel Caesar; Ludwig Lindell; Ylva Dimberg	Caesar & Loui	3:36
7.	"Love Is the Way" (사랑은 길이다; Sarang-eun Gil-ida)	Ku Tae-woo; Shin Hye-sun	Ryan S. Jhun; Denzil "DR" Remedios; Nermin Harambašić; Rodnae "Chikk" Bell; Courtney Jenaé Stahl; Charite Viken	Denzil "DR" Remedios	3:32
8.	"Carpool" (카풀; Kapul)	Kenzie	Sophia Ayana; Léon Paul Palmen; Nathan Cunningham; Marc Sibley	Sophia Ayana; Léon Paul Palmen; Space Primates	3:27
9.	"Umpah Umpah" (음파음파; Eumpa-eumpa; lit. 'Sonic Wave')	Jeon Gan-di	Christoffer Lauridsen; Andreas Öberg; Allison Kaplan	Christoffer Lauridsen; Andreas Öberg	3:40
10.	"LP"	Seo Ji-eum	Ryan S. Jhun; Hanif "Hitmanic" Sabzevari; Dennis "DeKo" Kordnejad; Pontus "PJ" Ljung; Anna Isbäck	Ryan S. Jhun; Hitmanic; DeKo; PJ	3:27
11.	"Parade" (안녕, 여름; Annyeong, Yeoreum; lit. 'Hello, Summer')	Seo Ji-eum	Fredrik Häggstam (Trinity Music); Johan Gustafsson (Trinity Music); Sebastian Lundberg (Trinity Music); Ylva Dimberg	Trinity Music	3:13
12.	"Bing Bing" (친구가 아냐; Chin-guga Anya; lit. 'Not A Friend')	Kim Soo-jin (Jam Factory)	Will Simms; Ylva Dimberg; Neil Athale	Will Simms; Ylva Dimberg; Neil Athale	3:27
13.	"Milkshake"	Kim Bo-eun	Jonatan Gusmark; Ludvig Evers; Cazzi Opeia; Per Kristian Ottestad	Moonshine	3:30
14.	"Sunny Side Up!"	Jeon Gan-di	Jonatan Gusmark; Ludvig Evers; Cazzi Opeia; Ellen Berg	Moonshine	3:23
15.	"Zimzalabim" (짐살라빔; Jimsallabim)	Lee Seu-ran	Olof Lindskog; Daniel Caesar; Ludwig Lindell; Hayley Aitken	Ollipop; Caesar & Loui	3:10
16.	"La Rouge" (Special Track)	JQ (MUMW); Moon Seoul (MUMW); Ahn Young-joo (MUMW); Mola (MUMW)	Andreas Öberg; Simon Petrén; Maja Keuc; Hwang Chan-hee; Hong So-jin	Simon Petrén	3:10
Total length:					55:35

The ReVe Festival: Finale – iTunes and Apple Music EP edition
No.	Title	Lyrics	Music	Arrangement	Length
1.	"Psycho"	Kenzie	Andrew "Druski" Scott; Cazzi Opeia; Ejae	Druski; Yoo Young-jin	3:31
2.	"In & Out"	Kenzie	Kenzie; Jonatan Gusmark; Ludvig Evers; Cazzi Opeia	Moonshine	3:13
3.	"Remember Forever"	Lee Seu-ran; Jang Yeo-jin (Lalala Studio)	Louise Frick Sveen; Jeon Byung-sun (Royal Dive); Hong Young-in (Royal Dive)	Royal Dive	3:08
4.	"La Rouge" (Special Track)	JQ (MUMW); Moon Seoul (MUMW); Ahn Young-joo (MUMW); Mola (MUMW)	Andreas Öberg; Simon Petrén; Maja Keuc; Hwang Chan-hee; Hong So-jin	Simon Petrén	3:10
Total length:					13:02

=== Notes ===
- Tracks 4 to 9 are from The ReVe Festival: Day 2, listed in a way that is inverted from the track listing in the EP, while tracks 10 to 15 are from The ReVe Festival: Day 1, following the same concept of track listing akin to tracks 4 to 9.

== Charts ==
=== Weekly charts ===
Weekly chart performance for The ReVe Festival: Finale
Chart (2019–2020)	Peak position
Belgian Albums (Ultratop Flanders)	181
Japanese Albums (Oricon)	24
Japanese Hot Albums (Billboard Japan)	45
Polish Albums (ZPAV)	45
South Korean Albums (Gaon)	1
Spanish Albums (Promusicae)	80
US Digital Albums (Billboard)	22
US Heatseekers Albums (Billboard)	2
US Independent Albums (Billboard)	8
US Top Album Sales (Billboard)	40
US Indie Store Album Sales (Billboard)	3
US World Albums (Billboard)	3

=== Year-end charts ===
Year-end chart performance for The ReVe Festival: Finale
Chart (2019)	Position
South Korean Albums (Gaon)	57
Chart (2022)	Position
South Korean Albums (Circle)	70

== Certifications and sales ==
Certifications for The ReVe Festival: Finale
Region	Certification	Certified units/sales
South Korea (KMCA)	Platinum	250,000^{^}
^{^} Shipments figures based on certification alone.

== Accolade ==
Year-end lists
Critic/Publication	List	Rank	Ref.
Idology Korea	2019: Album of the Year	1	

== Release history ==
Release history and formats for The ReVe Festival: Finale
Region	Date	Format	Label
Various	December 23, 2019	CD; digital download; streaming	SM Entertainment; Dreamus

== See also ==
- The ReVe Festival 2022 – Feel My Rhythm
- List of Gaon Album Chart number ones of 2019
- List of Gaon Album Chart number ones of 2020
