= The ReVe Festival: Day 1 =

- Digital and "Day 1" version cover

EP by Red Velvet
- Released: June 19, 2019
- Studios: SM Studios (Seoul, South Korea)
- Genres: K-pop; electropop
- Length: 20:10
- Languages: Korean; English
- Labels: SM; Dreamus

Red Velvet chronology
Sappy (2019)	The ReVe Festival: Day 1 (2019)	The ReVe Festival: Day 2 (2019)

Singles from The ReVe Festival: Day 1
- 1. "Zimzalabim" Released: June 19, 2019

Professional ratings
Review scores
Source	Rating
Exclaim!	7/10

The ReVe Festival: Day 1 (occasionally referred as Day 1) is the third special extended play and the tenth overall by South Korean girl group Red Velvet. Released on June 19, 2019, through SM Entertainment, the extended play served as the first installation of the group's The ReVe Festival trilogy, which was later followed by Day 2 and Finale. An electro-pop and dance-pop record, the EP contains six tracks that sees the group exploring new genres. Its production was handled by various songwriters and production teams, including Caesar & Loui, Ollipop, Moonshine, Trinity Music, Ylva Dimberg, Cazzi Opeia, Ryan S. Jhun, amongst others.

Upon its release, Day 1 received mixed to positive reviews from critics, who were polarized over its experimental and genre-hopping nature. It was commercially successful domestically, becoming their ninth chart-topper on the Gaon Album Chart. Its lead single, "Zimzalabim", additionally peaked at number 11 and 10 on the Gaon Digital Chart and World Digital Songs charts, respectively. To promote the release, Red Velvet embarked on their third concert tour, titled La Rouge, and included songs from the EP on its setlist.

== Background and release ==
Following the release of their second Japanese extended play Sappy on May 29, 2019, SM Entertainment shared the first preview of The ReVe Festival through social media platforms on June 4, 2019, along with the release announcement for the trilogy within 2019. The name ReVe was stemmed from the abbreviation of Red Velvet, also meaning "dream" or "fantasy" in French. It was also named after the fictional robotic character that served as a mascot during the group's second concert tour, titled Redmare. In addition, the label also revealed that The character also appeared in promotional material for the trilogy as well. The lead single, "Zimzalabim", has additionally been described as an "addictive electro pop with rhythmic drums and cool melodies".

== Promotion ==
The EP was announced through social media on June 4, 2019, with a teaser image of a gold coin featuring the band members' names, the title and date on it. On June 10, the band confirmed the lead single would be "Zimzalabim" through their social media.

A special music video for "Milkshake" was uploaded on August 1, 2019, to coincide with the group's fifth anniversary. The video was first shown at the group's anniversary fan-meeting event, 'inteRView vol.5'.

== Reception ==
Commercially, the CD version of the EP debuted atop the Gaon Weekly Album Chart, and sold 156,993 copies by the end of 2019 in South Korea, placing thirty-seventh for the year. While the kihno version of the EP placing forty-ninth in the monthly chart with 3,611 copies. It was the group's eleventh top-ten entry on the Billboard World Albums chart, their third appearance on the component UK Digital Albums chart, and their fourth top-twenty entry on the Oricon Albums Chart.

The Reve Festival: Day 1 received an Album Bonsang nomination at the 34th Golden Disc Awards. The track "Sunny Side Up" was additionally ranked number 10 in MTV's list of 20 "Best K-pop B-sides of 2019".

== Track listing ==
The ReVe Festival: Day 1 track listing
No.	Title	Lyrics	Music	Arrangement	Length
1.	"Zimzalabim" (짐살라빔; Jimsallabim)	Lee Seu-ran	Olof Lindskog; Daniel Caesar; Ludwig Lindell; Hayley Aitken	Ollipop; Caesar & Loui	3:10
2.	"Sunny Side Up!"	Jeon Gan-di	Jonatan Gusmark; Ludvig Evers; Cazzi Opeia; Ellen Berg	Moonshine	3:23
3.	"Milkshake"	Kim Bo-eun	Jonatan Gusmark; Ludvig Evers; Cazzi Opeia; Per Kristian Ottestad	Moonshine	3:30
4.	"Bing Bing" (친구가 아냐; Chin-guga Anya; lit. 'Not A Friend')	Kim Soo-jin (Jam Factory)	Will Simms; Ylva Dimberg; Neil Athale	Will Simms; Ylva Dimberg; Neil Athale	3:27
5.	"Parade" (안녕, 여름; Annyeong, Yeoreum; lit. 'Hello, Summer')	Seo Ji-eum	Fredrik Häggstam (Trinity Music); Johan Gustafsson (Trinity Music); Sebastian Lundberg (Trinity Music); Ylva Dimberg	Trinity Music	3:13
6.	"LP"	Seo Ji-eum	Ryan S. Jhun; Hanif "Hitmanic" Sabzevari; Dennis "DeKo" Kordnejad; Pontus "PJ" Ljung; Anna Isbäck	Ryan S. Jhun; Hitmanic; DeKo; PJ	3:27
Total length:					20:10

== Charts ==
=== Weekly charts ===
Chart (2019)	Peak position
French Digital Albums (SNEP)	53
Japanese Albums (Oricon)	20
Japan Hot Albums (Billboard Japan)	46
South Korean Albums (Gaon)	1
UK Album Downloads (Official Charts)	68
UK Independent Album Breakers (OCC)	16
US Heatseekers Albums (Billboard)	5
US Independent Albums (Billboard)	22
US World Albums (Billboard)	7

=== Year-end charts ===
Chart (2019)	Position
South Korea (Gaon)	37

== Certifications ==
Certifications for The ReVe Festival: Day 1
Region	Certification	Certified units/sales
South Korea (KMCA)	Platinum	250,000^{^}
^{^} Shipments figures based on certification alone.

== Release history ==
Region	Date	Format	Label
Various	June 19, 2019	CD; digital download; streaming	SM Entertainment
South Korea	June 28, 2019	SMC	SM Entertainment

== See also ==
- The ReVe Festival: Day 2
- The ReVe Festival: Finale
- The ReVe Festival 2022 – Feel My Rhythm
- The ReVe Festival 2022 – Birthday
