= Zimzalabim =

2019 song by Red Velvet

Single by Red Velvet

from the EP The ReVe Festival: Day 1
- Language: Korean
- Released: June 19, 2019
- Recorded: 2019
- Studio: SM Studio Center, Seoul, South Korea
- Genre: EDM; electropop; avant-pop
- Length: 3:10
- Label: SM; Dreamus
- Composers: Olof Lindskog; Daniel Caesar; Ludwig Lindell; Hayley Aitken
- Lyricist: Lee Seu-ran

Red Velvet singles chronology
"Close to Me" (Red Velvet remix) (2019)	"Zimzalabim" (2019)	"Umpah Umpah" (2019)

Music video
- "Zimzalabim" on YouTube

"Zimzalabim" (Korean: 짐살라빔; RR: Jimsallabim) is a song recorded by South Korean girl group Red Velvet for their sixth Korean extended play The ReVe Festival: Day 1, which acts as the first installment of the group's The ReVe Festival trilogy. Primarily an EDM-influenced electropop track that resembles a "colorful parade" and showcases an extravagant soundscape, the song was composed by production duo Caesar & Loui, Ollipop and Hayley Aitken with Korean lyrics written by lyricist Lee Seu-ran, which tells the listeners to "unfold a dream" that is "held deeply" in their heart. Accompanied by an amusement park-themed music video, it was released on June 19, 2019 by SM Entertainment as the lead single for Day 1, and subsequently the first single from The ReVe Festival trilogy.

Upon its release, "Zimzalabim" polarized music critics over its "genre-hopping" composition. While some felt the song was a "downhill" from the group's previous experimenting tunes, others saw the song as a sonic roller coaster ride and praised its "energetic, anthemic" sound. It also attained moderate success, becoming their first lead single to miss the top ten on Gaon Digital Chart, peaking at number eleven, while earning Red Velvet their fourteenth consecutive top-ten entry on Billboard's World Digital Songs chart. The song also marked the group's first chart appearance in Oceania, peaking at number thirty-nine on New Zealand Hot Singles Chart.

== Background and release ==
Following the release of their second Japanese extended play Sappy on May, SM Entertainment shared the first preview of The ReVe Festival through social media accounts on June 4, 2019 The word "Zimzalabim" was revealed on June 8 to 9 through the videos posted on Red Velvet's official social media accounts. The group released a trailer video on June 10 which announced the full-scale start of The ReVe Festival through their YouTube and V Live channels. It was revealed that SM Entertainment chief producer Lee Soo-man has been holding the song for a while, but strongly suggested that the group was ready to pull the track off as a title song. The song had its official digital release on June 19, 2019, along with The ReVe Festival: Day 1.

== Composition ==
"Zimzalabim"
"Zimzalabim" is an electropop song that flits from genre to genre.

"Zimzalabim" was composed by Olof Lindskog, Daniel Caesar, Ludwig Lindell and Hayley Aitken. In an email interview with The Korea Herald, Daniel Caesar and Ludwig Lindell under the name of Caesar & Loui revealed that the song was inspired by Girls' Generation's "I Got a Boy".

Musically, Tamar Herman of Billboard characterized "Zimzalabim" as an electropop song with "funky percussive melodies, tinny hip-hop chants, EDM dance breaks, and chill, groovy moments". It is composed in the key of F major, with a tempo of 128 beat-per-minute. Choi Young-joo of No Cut News noted the "rhythmic drumming and cool melodies". In addition, Lee Jung-ho of Star News noted the song's unconventional style and frequent changes in genre. Lyrically, "Zimzalabim" talks about "breaking convention, reaching for your dreams, and letting a little bit of magic back into your life".

== Music video ==
Red Velvet members in a scene captured from the music video of "Zimzalabim".

On June 10, 2019, the trailer video titled "Special Competition: RVF D-10", was uploaded through the Red Velvet's official YouTube channel. On June 17, 2019, a 17-second video teaser for "Zimzalabim" was uploaded on the official SM Town channel. A final 19-second video teaser was uploaded the next day, and the music video for "Zimzalabim" was released on June 19, 2019.

The music video is set in a fantastical amusement park, where they ride roller coasters through the skies, throw a tea party in a spinning teacup and perform the song alongside sentient instruments. Following the music video's release, writer Tamar Herman of Billboard described it as "a bright music video", further praising the video for "the song's mesmerizing choreography". Writer Puah Ziwei of NME noted the "energetic" music video. Emlyn Travis of Buzzfeed noted the video as "magical" referring to its "carnival rides, floating instruments, tea cups, and a hefty dose of fantasy".

== Live performances ==
Red Velvet promoted the song on several music programs in South Korea including Show! Music Core, Music Bank and Inkigayo. The group received five music show trophies for the song. On June 22, 2019, Red Velvet has released methods of applying for the global dance cover campaign, "Zimzalabim In Public" through various official SNS accounts, as well as a focus cam by members with the highlight choreography of the new song, and the group dance shooting site. On June 25, 2019, a flash mob performance video, titled "ZIP.CODE : SEOUL" was uploaded to the SM Town official YouTube channel. About 500 people, including famous YouTube creators Na Ha-eun and Go Toe-kyung were part of the performance.

== Critical reception ==
Professional ratings
Review scores
Source	Rating
Y-Magazine	3.5/5 stars

Following its initial release, "Zimzalabim" was met with mixed reviews from music critics. Tamar Herman of Billboard magazine viewed the track as an "extravagant soundscape", adding it as a "genre-hopping song, which incorporates an addicting chorus". Writer Kim Do-hyun of IZM described the track as "neither a meaningful experiment nor a significant point in Red Velvet's career". The music video was placed atop BuzzFeed's list of "Best K-pop Music Videos of 2019", where it claimed that the video showcased everything "from dancing crystalline animals to boots that march on their own", labelling it as "a perfect example of how Red Velvet boldly pushes creative boundaries with grace, style, and a sprinkle of magic."

== Commercial performance ==
"Zimzalabim" debuted at number 14 on the Gaon Digital Chart and peaked at number 11 the following week. The song debuted at number 8 on the Billboard K-pop Hot 100 before reaching number 4 in its second week. It was later ranked at number 169 on the year-end Gaon Digital Chart for 2019. It became the group's fourteenth consecutive top-ten single on the World Digital Song Sales chart, reaching number 10 three weeks after its release. Moreover, "Zimzalabim" reached the weekly chart in New Zealand, becoming their first entry on the latter chart.

== Accolades ==
"Zimzalabim" received nominations for the 2019 Mnet Asian Music Awards and the 9th Gaon Chart Music Awards. The song managed to receive five music program wins. The song also achieved two consecutive Melon Weekly Popularity Awards.

Awards and nominations for "Zimzalabim"
Year	Organization	Award	Result	Ref.
2019	Mnet Asian Music Awards	Best Dance Performance (Female Group)	Nominated	
2019	Mnet Asian Music Awards	Song of the Year	Longlisted	
2020	Gaon Chart Music Awards	Song of the Year – June	Nominated	

Music program awards
Program	Date	Ref.
Show Champion	June 26, 2019	
M Countdown	June 27, 2019	
Music Bank	June 28, 2019	
Show! Music Core	June 29, 2019	
Inkigayo	June 30, 2019	

Melon popularity award
Award	Date	Ref.
Weekly Popularity Award	July 1, 2019	
Weekly Popularity Award	July 8, 2019	

== Usage in media ==
On January 15, 2020, Trolls World Tour used "Zimzalabim" in a trailer that was released by Thailand film distributor Major Group marking the appearance of Red Velvet in the film. On April 8, 2020 the film also used the song in the trailer released by South Korean Universal Pictures.

== Credits and personnel ==
Credits adapted from the liner notes of The ReVe Festival: Day 1.

Studio

- Recorded at SM Blue Cup Studio
- Digital edited and engineered for mix at SM LYVIN Studio
- Mixed at SM Blue Ocean Studio

Personnel

- Red Velvet (Irene, Seulgi, Wendy, Joy, Yeri) – vocals, background vocals
- Lee Seu-ran – Korean lyrics
- Olof Lindskog – original writer, composition, arrangement
- Daniel Caesar – original writer, composition, arrangement
- Ludwig Lindell – original writer, composition, arrangement
- Hayley Aitken – original writer, composition, background vocals
- Kenzie – vocal director
- Jeong Eui-seok – recording
- Lee Ji-hong – digital editing, mixing engineer
- Kim Chul-soon – mixing

== Charts ==
=== Weekly charts ===
Weekly chart performance
Chart (2019)	Peak position
New Zealand Hot Singles (RMNZ)	39
Singapore Regional (RIAS)	18
South Korea (Gaon)	11
South Korea (K-pop Hot 100)	4
US World Digital Songs (Billboard)	10

=== Monthly charts ===
Monthly chart performance
Chart (2019)	Position
South Korea (Gaon)	32

=== Year-end charts ===
2019 year-end charts
Chart (2019)	Position
South Korea (Gaon)	169

== Release history ==
Release dates and formats
Region	Date	Format	Label	Ref.
Various	June 19, 2019	Digital download; streaming	SM Entertainment; Dreamus	

== See also ==
- List of M Countdown Chart winners (2019)
- List of Inkigayo Chart winners (2019)
