= List of songs recorded by Red Velvet =

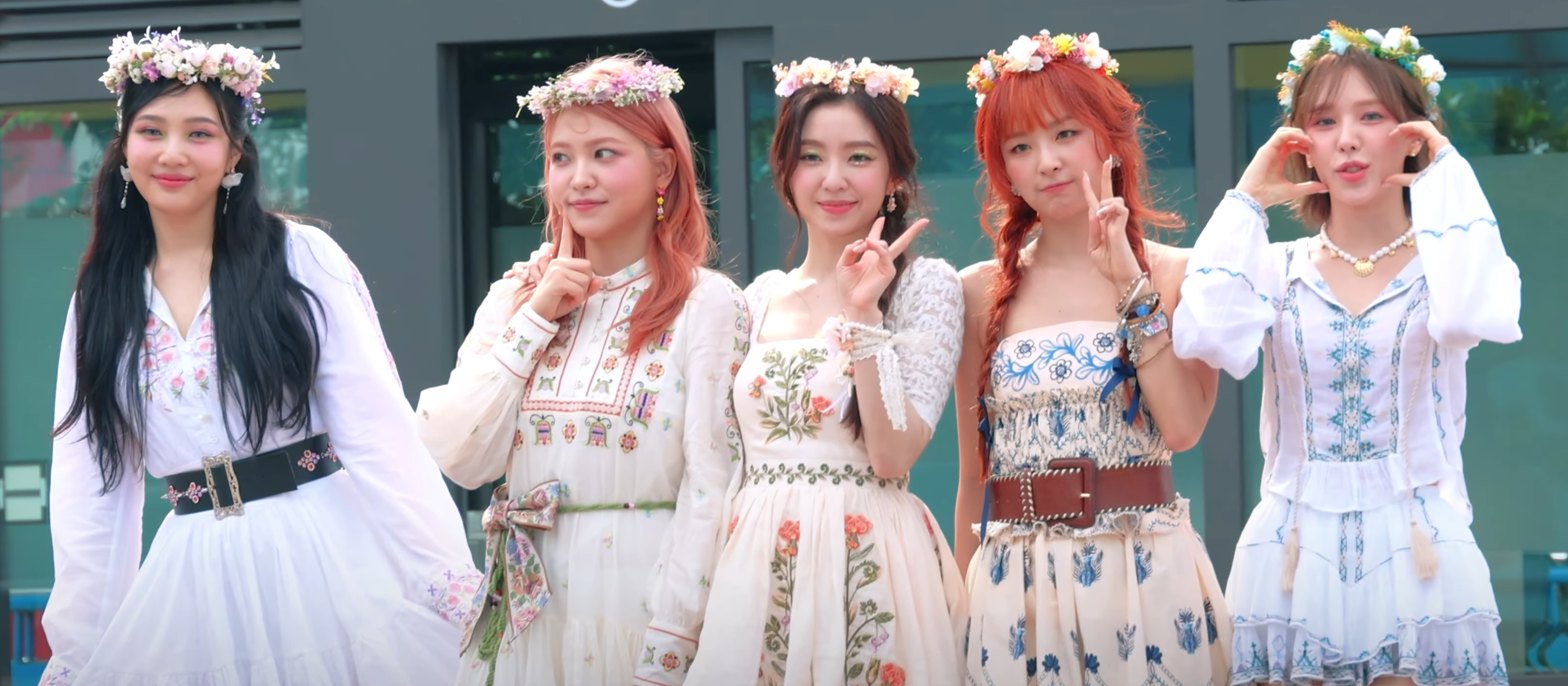
Red Velvet in 2024.

The following is a list of songs recorded by South Korean girl group Red Velvet. As of date, the girl group has officially released 150 songs. (Note: 150 total songs consisting of: 131 songs originally recorded in Korean.; 11 songs originally recorded in Japanese.; 6 Japanese versions of songs originally recorded in Korean.; 2 English versions of songs originally recorded in Korean.) 131 songs are originally recorded in Korean and 11 are originally in Japanese. Additionally, 8 songs are versions of songs originally recorded in a different language.

Formed by entertainment company SM Entertainment, the group debuted in August 2014 and initially consisted of four members; Irene, Seulgi, Wendy and Joy. In March 2015, Yeri joined the group.

Indicates a single release

== Songs originally recorded in Korean ==
List of Korean songs, showing year released, writers name, and originating album
Song	Year	Writer(s)	Album	Ref.
"About Love"	2017	January 8 (lalala Studio); RE:ONE; Davey Nate	Perfect Velvet	
"All Right"	2018	Jam Factory; Kevin Charge; Phoebus Tassopoulos; Jessica Jean Pfeiffer	The Perfect Red Velvet	
"Attaboy"	2017	Kenzie; The Stereotypes; Ylva Dimberg	Perfect Velvet	
"Automatic"	2015	Choi So-young; Daniel Obi Klien; Charli Taft	Ice Cream Cake	
"Bad Boy" (Note: The English version was released as part of Summer Magic in 2018.)	2018	JQ; Moon Hee-yeon; The Stereotypes; Maxx Song; Whitney Phillips; Yoo Young-jin	The Perfect Red Velvet	
"Bad Dracula"	2016	Jo Yun-gyeong; Choi Suk-jin; Tomas Smågesjø; Nermin Harambasic; Courtney Woolsey	Russian Roulette	
"Bamboleo"	2022	Cha Yu-bin; Jake K Maria Marcus; Andreas Öberg; MCK	The ReVe Festival 2022 – Feel My Rhythm	
"Beautiful Christmas"	2022	Kim Jae-won; Justin Reinstein @Number K	2022 Winter SM Town: SMCU Palace	
"Beg for Me"	2022	Jo Yoon-kyung; Josefin Glenmark; Gavin Jones; Ludwig Lindell	The ReVe Festival 2022 – Feel My Rhythm	
"Better Be"	2021	Kim In-hyung (Jam Factory); Andreas Öberg; Skylar Mones; Michele Wylen	Queendom	
"Be Natural"	2014	Yoo Young-jin	Non-album single	
"Bing Bing" (친구가 아냐)	2019	Kim Soo-jin; Will Simms; Ylva Dimberg; Neil Athale	The ReVe Festival: Day 1	
"Birthday"	2022	Kim Min-ji; EJAE; Kole; Isaac Han; Aaron Kim; Ghostchild Ltd; Loosen Door	The ReVe Festival 2022 – Birthday	
"Blue Lemonade"	2018	Seo Ji-eum; Lee Joo-hyung; NOPARI; Cazzi Opeia	Summer Magic	
"Body Talk"	2017	Misfit; Jo Yoon-kyung; Sebastian Lundberg; Fredrik Haggstam; Johan Gustafsson; Ylva Dimberg	Rookie	
"Bubble"	2024	Sumin; Soyo	Cosmic	
"Bulldozer"	2023	Bay (153/Joombas); Jacob Attwooll; Jon Eyden; Moa "Cazzi Opeia" Carlebecker	Chill Kill	
"Butterflies"	2018	Jo Yoon-kyung; Harvey Mason Jr. Michael Wyckoff; Joshua Golden; Patrick 'J. Que' Smith; Dewain Whitmore; Britt Burton; Yoo Young-jin	RBB	
"Bye Bye"	2022	Kenzie; Ludwig Evers; Jonatan Gusmark; Moa "Cazzi Opeia" Carlebecker; Ellen Berg	The ReVe Festival 2022 – Birthday	
"Campfire"	2015	Jo Yun-kyeong; LDN Noise; Taylor Parks; Denzil "DR" Remedios; Ryan S. Jhun	The Red	
"Candy" (사탕)	2015	Hong Ji-yoo; Claire Rodrigues Lee; Kevin Charge	Ice Cream Cake	
"Carpool"	2019	Sophia Avana; Léon Paul Palmen; Nathan Cunningham; Marc Sibley	The ReVe Festival: Day 2	
"Celebrate"	2022	Bay (153/Joombas); Kenneth Chris Mackey; Anna Graceman	The ReVe Festival 2022 – Birthday	
"Chill Kill"	2023	Kenzie; Ludwig Evers; Jonatan Gusmark; Moa "Cazzi Opeia" Carlebecker; Ellen Berg	Chill Kill	
"Close to Me"	2019	Ellie Goulding; Ilya Salmanzadeh; Peter Svensson; Wooyoung Jang; Wendy; Yeri; Sungsu Min; Eugene Kwon; Min-Kyu Lee; Lee Seu Ran; Savan Kotecha; Thomas Wesley Pentz	Non-album single	
"Cool Hot Sweet Love"	2016	Kenzie; Daniel Obi Klein; Charli Taft; Michael Nordmark; Thomas Sardorf	The Velvet	
"Cool World"	2015	Im Seo-hyun; Daniel "Obi" Klein; Marcus Winther-John; Andy Love	The Red	
"Cosmic"	2024	Kenzie; Ludwig Evers; Jonathan Gusmark; Adrian McKinnon; Ellen Berg	Cosmic	
"Day 1"	2015	Hwang-hyun	The Red	
"Don't U Wait no More"	2015	100%Seo-jeong; Dwayne Abernathy Jr.,(Dem Jointz); Taylor Parks; Ryan S. Jhun	The Red	
"Dumb Dumb" (Note: The Japanese version was released as part of #Cookie Jar in 2018.)	2015	Seo Ji-eum; Kim Dong-hyun; LDN Noise; Deanna Dellacioppa; Taylor Parks; Ryan S. Jhun	The Red	
"Eyes Locked, Hands Locked" (눈 맞추고, 손 맞대고)	2019	SUMIN	The ReVe Festival: Day 2	
"Feel My Rhythm"	2022	Seo Ji-eum; Jake K Maria Marcus; Andreas Öberg; MCK	The ReVe Festival 2022 – Feel My Rhythm	
"First Time" (처음인가요)	2016	Kenzie	The Velvet	
"Fool"	2016	January 8 (lalala Studio); Malin Johansson; Josef Melin	Russian Roulette	
"Future" (미래)	2020	Taibian; Park Se-joon; Bark; YESY	Start-Up OST	
"Good, Bad, Ugly"	2022	Danke; Park Geun-tae; MinGtion; Sophia Pae	The ReVe Festival 2022 – Feel My Rhythm	
"Happily Ever After"	2017	Song Carat; Sebastian Lundberg; Fredrik Haggstam; Johan Gustafsson; Courtney Woolsey; Deez	Rookie	
"Happiness" (행복)	2014	Yoo Young-jin; Will Simms; Chad Hugo; The Neptunes; Chris Holsten; Anne Judith Wik	Non-album single	
"Hawaii"	2026	Lewis Gardiner; Ryan Laurie; Emily Middlemas	Velvet Summer	
"Hear the Sea" (바다가 들려)	2017	Hwang Hyun	The Red Summer	
"Hello, Sunset" (다시 여름)	2021	Choi Bo-ra (153Joombas); Sam Klempner; Noémie Legrand; Dewain Whitmore Jr.	Queendom	
"Hit That Drum"	2018	Misfit; Ronny Svendson; Nermin Harambasic; Anne Judith Wik; Blair MacKichan	Summer Magic	
"Hot Girls Cold Vibe"	2026	Kenzie; Ronny Svendsen; Adrian Thessen; Anne Juddith Wik; Bobii Lewis	Velvet Summer	
"Huff n Puff"	2015	Kenzie; Alex G Anne Preven; Will Gray; Jaden Michaels	The Red	
"Hula Hoop"	2026	Matilda Thompson; Max Wolfgang; Littens Anton Rilsson; Ahhrberg	Velvet Summer	
"I Just"	2017	Kim Boo-min; Aventurina King; Hitchhiker; John Fulford	Perfect Velvet	
"Ice Cream Cake"	2015	Jo Yoon-kyung; Kim Dong-hyun; Hayley Aitken; Sebastian Lundberg; Fredrik Haggstam; Johan Gustafson	Ice Cream Cake	
"Iced Coffee"	2023	Jo Yoon-kyung; Alina Smith; Annalise Morelli (153/Joombas); Gabriella DeMartino	Chill Kill	
"In & Out"	2019	Kenzie; Moonshine; Cazzi Opeia	The ReVe Festival: Finale	
"In My Dreams"	2022	Kim Su-ji; Alma Goodman; Alida Garpestad Peck; Kristoffer Tømmerbakke; Erik Smaaland	The ReVe Festival 2022 – Feel My Rhythm	
"Jumpin'"	2019	Kenzie; Caesar & Loui; Yiva Dimberg	The ReVe Festival: Day 2	
"Just Sing"	2020	Justin Timberlake; Ludwig Göransson; Max Martin; Sarah Aarons	Trolls World Tour: Original Motion Picture Soundtrack	
"Kingdom Come"	2017	Lee Seu-ran; The Stereotypes; Deez; Ylva Dimberg	Perfect Velvet	
"Knock Knock (Who's There?)"	2023	Jo Yoon-kyung; Jinbyjin; Moa "Cazzi Opeia" Carlebecker; Ellen Berg	Chill Kill	
"Knock on Wood"	2021	Seo Ji-eum; Jonatan Gusmark (Moonshine); Ludvig Evers (Moonshine); Moa "Cazzi Opeia" Carlebecker; Ellen Berg	Queendom	
"La Rouge"	2019	JQ; Moon Seo-ul; Ahn Young-joo (makeumine works) mola (makeumine works); Andreas Öberg; Simon Petrén; Maja Keuc; Hwang Chan-hee; Hong So-jin	The ReVe Festival: Finale	
"Ladies Night"	2019	MonoTree; Andreas Öberg; Maja Keuc	The ReVe Festival: Day 2	
"Lady's Room"	2015	Kenzie; Daniel Obi Klein; Oliver McEwan; Ylva Dimberg	The Red	
"Last Drop"	2024	Bay (153/Joombas); Zaya (153/Joombas)	Cosmic	
"Last Love"	2017	John Hyunkyu Lee; Park Geun-tae	Rookie	
"Light Me Up"	2016	Kenzie; Deez; Rodnae "Chikk" Bell	The Velvet	
"Little Little"	2017	JQ; Jo Min-yang; Park Sung-hee; Gifty Dankwah; Bruce Fielder	Rookie	
"Look" (봐)	2017	Jinbo; Sumin; Charli Taft; Daniel Obi Klien	Perfect Velvet	
"Love Arcade"	2024	Liljune (153/Joombas); Ryan Kim; Devine Channel; Jayna Brown denzelworldpeace Sakehands; Yumi K. Geist Way	Cosmic	
"Love is the Way"	2019	Denzil "DR" Remedios; Nermin Harambasic; Rodnae "Chikk" Bell; Courtney Woolsey; Charite Viken	The ReVe Festival: Day 2	
"LP"	2019	Seo Ji-eum; Ryan S. Jhun; Hanif Hitmanic Sabzevari; Dennis DeKo Kordnejad; Pontus PJ Ljung; Anna Isbäck	The ReVe Festival: Day 1	
"Lucky Girl"	2016	Kenzie; Hayley Aitken; Ollipop	Russian Roulette	
"Milkshake"	2019	Kim Bo-eun; Moonshine; Cazzi Opeia; Boots a.k.a. Per Kristian Ottestad	The ReVe Festival: Day 1	
"Milky Way"	2020	Kenzie	Non-album single	
"Mojito" (여름빛)	2017	JQ; Hyun Ji-won; Johannes Josh Jorgensen; Lars Halvor Jensen	The Red Summer	
"Moonlight Melody" (달빛 소리)	2017	Lee Joo-hyung; Kwon Deok-geun	Perfect Velvet	
"Mosquito"	2018	Seo Ji-eum; Teddy Riley; Lee Hyun-seung; DOM; Daniel Obi Klein; Ylva Dimberg	Summer Magic	
"Mr. E"	2018	Kenzie; Trinity; Courtney Woolsey	Summer Magic	
"My Dear"	2016	Hwang Hyun	Russian Roulette	
"My Second Date" (두 번째 데이트)	2017	Jeon Gan-di; James Wong; Sidnie Tipton; Sophie Stern	Perfect Velvet	
"Night Drive"	2024	Danke; Moon Seol-ri; Na Jeong-ah (153/Joombas); Yoo Jae-eun (JamFactory)	Cosmic	
"Nightmare"	2023	Mok Ji-min (lalala studio); David Anthony Eames; Moa "Cazzi Opeia" Carlebecker; Ellen Berg	Chill Kill	
"Oh Boy"	2015	Goo Tae-woo; Herbie Crichlow; Lauren Dyson; Jin Suk Choi; LDN Noise	The Red	
"On a Ride" (롤러 코스터	2022	Danke (Lalala Studio); Ryvng (153/Joombas); Maynine (153/Joombas); Tim Tan; Ciara Muscat; Perrie (153/Joombas); Oh Hyung-seok	The ReVe Festival 2022 – Birthday	
"One Kiss"	2023	Lee Seu-ran; Jonathan Gusmark; Ludvig Evers; Moa "Cazzi Opeia" Carlebecker; Ellen Berg	Chill Kill	
"One of These Nights" (7월 7일)	2016	Seo Ji-eum; Hwang Chan-hee; Andreas Öberg; Maria Marcus	The Velvet	
"Orchestra"	2026	Aftrshok; Bluar; Iris; Chanti; Henry Mancini	Velvet Summer	
"Parade" (안녕, 여름)	2019	Seo Ji-eum; Fredrik Häggstam; Johan Gustafsson; Sebastian Lundberg; Ylva Dimberg	The ReVe Festival: Day 1	
"Peek-a-Boo" (Note: The Japanese version was released as part of Sappy in 2019.) (피카부)	2017	Kenzie; Moonshine; Cazzi Opeia; Ellen Berg Tollbom	Perfect Velvet	
"Perfect 10"	2017	Jo Yoon-kyung; Charli Taft; Daniel "Obi" Klein; Deez	Perfect Velvet	
"Pose"	2021	Lee Seu-ran; Fabian Torsson; Harry Sommerdahl; Ylva Dimberg; Moa "Cazzi Opeia" Carlebecker	Queendom	
"Power Up" (Note: The Japanese version was released as part of Sappy in 2019.)	2018	Kenzie; Ellen Berg Tollbom; Cazzi Opeia; Jonatan Gusmark; Ludvig Evers	Summer Magic	
"Psycho"	2019	Kenzie; Andrew Scott; Cazzi Opeia; EJAE	The ReVe Festival: Finale	
"Pushin' N Pullin"	2021	Kenzie; Mike Daly; Mitchell Owens; Nicole Cohen	Queendom	
"Queendom"	2021	Jo Yoon-kyung; MinGtion (밍지션); Anne Judith Stokke Wik; Moa "Cazzi Opeia" Carlebecker; Ellen Berg	Queendom	
"Rainbow Halo"	2022	Seo Ji-eum; Harvey Mason Jr. Michael R!ot Wyckoff; Patrick "J. Que" Smith; Britt Burton; Deez	The ReVe Festival 2022 – Feel My Rhythm	
"RBB (Really Bad Boy)" (Note: The English version was released as part of RBB in 2018.)	2018	Kenzie; Timothy 'Bos' Bullock; Sara Forsberg; MZMC	RBB	
"Rebirth" (환생)	2017	Yoon Jong-shin	SM Station Season 2	
"Red Dress"	2015	Jo Yun-kyeong; Nermin Harambasic; Jin Suk Choi; Charite Viken; LDN Noise; Rodnae "Chikk" Bell; Ryan S. Jhun	The Red	
"Red Flavor" (Note: The Japanese version was released as part of #Cookie Jar in 2018.) (빨간 맛)	2017	Kenzie; Yeri; Daniel Caesar; Ludwig Lindell	The Red Summer	
"Remember Forever"	2019	Lee Seuran; Jang Yeo-jin (Lalala Studio); Louise Frick Sveen; Royal Dive	The ReVe Festival: Finale	
"Rookie" (Note: The Japanese version was released as part of Sappy in 2019.)	2017	Jo Yoon-kyung; Jamil 'Digi' Chammas; Leven Kali; Sara Forsberg; Karl Powell; Harrison Johnson; Russell Steedle; MZMC; Otha 'Vakseen' Davis III; Tay Jasper	Rookie	
"Rose Scent Breeze" (장미꽃 향기는 바람에 날리고)	2016	Jung Hye-kyung; Hong Jong-ha	The Velvet	
"Run Devil Run"	2025		2025 SM Town: The Culture, the Future	
"Russian Roulette" (Note: The Japanese version was released as part of #Cookie Jar in 2018.) (러시안 룰렛)	2016	Jo Yun Gyeong; Albi Albertsson; Belle Humble; Markus Lindell	Russian Roulette	
"Sassy Me" (멋있게)	2018	Kenzie; Moonshine; Anne Judith Wik	RBB	
"Scenery"	2023	Lee Joo-hyung (MonoTree); Jukjae; Willemijn May; Ciara Muscat	Chill Kill	
"See the Stars"	2019	Song Dong-woon; Ji Hoon; Park Se-joon; Yoo Song-yeon; Jay Lee (SM LVYIN Studio)	Hotel del Luna OST	
"So Good"	2018	Kim In Hyung; LDN Noise; Deez; Ellen Berg Tollbom	RBB	
"Some Love"	2016	Kenzie	Russian Roulette	
"Somethin' Kinda Crazy"	2015	Kenzie; Teddy Riley; DOM; Lee Hyun-seung for TRX; Charli Taft	Ice Cream Cake	
"Stupid Cupid"	2015	Sung Hyun-bin; Andrew Choi; 220; Hayley Aitken; Cha Cha Malone	Ice Cream Cake	
"Sunflower"	2024	Moa "Cazzi Opeia" Carlebecker; Wilhelmina; Jonatan Gusmark; Ludvig Evers	Cosmic	
"Sunny Afternoon"	2016	Jeong Ju Hee; Simon Petrén; Andreas Öberg; Maja Keuc; Kim One	Russian Roulette	
"Sunny Side Up!"	2019	Jeon Gandi; Moonshine; Ellen Berg; Cazzi Opeia	The ReVe Festival: Day 1	
"Surfin' Boy"	2026	Joy; Soulkidd; Honey Noise; Kwon Ae-jin; Ikki	Velvet Summer	
"Sweet Dreams"	2024	Moon Seol-ri; Danke; Zaya (153/Joombas); Choi Bo-ra (153/Joombas); Kim Soo-ji (lalala studio); Alexei Viktorovitch; Kella Armitage; Gavin Jones	Cosmic	
"Talk to Me	2017	Lee Seu-ran; Kervens Mazile; Annalise Morelli; Alina Smith; Mats Ymell; Vicente Castro; Justin Matias	Rookie	
"Take It Slow"	2015	G-High; Lee Ju-hyung	Ice Cream Cake	
"Taste"	2018	Park Sung Hee; Penomeco; Dem Jointz	RBB	
"Time Slip"	2015	Moon Du-ri; Daniel "Obi" Klein; Johannes "Josh" Jorgensen; Charli Taft; Jinbo	The Red	
"Time to Love"	2018	Kang Eun-jeong; Ellen Berg Tollbom; Kim Min-Ji; Lee Dong-Hoon	The Perfect Red Velvet	
"To Get What Your Heart Wants" (너에게 원한건)	2016	Hong Jong-goo; Cheon Seong-il	Two Yoo Project Sugar Man OST Part 13	
"Umpah Umpah"	2019	Christoffer Lauridsen; Andreas Öberg; Allison Kaplan	The ReVe Festival: Day 2	
"Underwater"	2023	Kim Bo-eun (Jam Factory); B Ham; Deez; Lourdiz	Chill Kill	
"Will I Ever See You Again?"	2023	Lee Eun-hwa (153/Joombas); Kang Eun-jung; Lee Hye-yum (Jam Factory); Lee Seu-ran; Moon Seol-ri; Mats Koray Genc; Nermin Harambasic; Moa "Cazzi Opeia" Carlebecker; Siv Marit Egseth; Hugo Solis; Kristian Dahl Bergsland	Chill Kill	
"Wings"	2023	Jang Jung-won (Jam Factory); Na Jeong-ah (153/Joombas); Greg Bonnick; Hayden Chapman; Adrian McKinnon; Taet Chesterton; Sevn Dayz	Chill Kill	
"Wish Tree" (세가지 소원)	2015	January 8 (lalala Studio); Matthew Tishler; Felicia Barton; Aaron Benward	Winter Garden	
"With You" (한 여름의 크리스마스)	2018	January 8 (lalala Studio); Song Carat; Nermin Harambasic; Anne Judith Wik; JINBYJIN; Hugo Solis; Gionata Caracciolo	Summer Magic	
"Would U"	2017	Albi Albertsson; Belle Humble; Markus Lindell	SM Station Season 2	
"Yossism"	2016	Park Min-seo	Telemonster OST	
"You Better Know"	2017	Lee Seu-ran; JQ; Choi Ji-hye; Becky Jerams; Pontus Persson; Kanata Okajima	The Red Summer	
"Zimzalabim" (짐살라빔)	2019	Lee Seu-ran; Olof Lindskog; Daniel Caesar; Ludwig Lindell; Hayley Aitken	The ReVe Festival: Day 1	
"Zoo"	2017	Lee Seu-ran; LDN Noise; Courtney Woolsey; Alice Penrose	The Red Summer	
"Zoom"	2022	Hwang Yu-bin; Jinbyjin; Karen Poole; Farida Bolseth Benounis; Sondre Mulongo Nystrøm; Anne Judith Wik (Dsign Music)	The ReVe Festival 2022 – Birthday	

== Songs originally recorded in Japanese ==
List of Japanese songs, showing year released, writers name, and originating album
Song	Year	Writer(s)	Album	Ref.
"#Cookie Jar"	2018	MEG.ME; Efraim Faramir Sixten Fransesco Vindalf Cederqvist Leo; JFMee; Gavin Jones; Saima Iren Mian; Ronny Vidar Svendsen; Anne Judith Wik; Nermin Harambasic	#Cookie Jar	
"Aitai-tai"	2018	H.Toyosaki; MonoTree	#Cookie Jar	
"'Cause It's You"	2018	Agehasprings; Anne Judith Wik; Ronny Vidar Svendsen; Nermin Harambasic; Jin Suk Choi; Justin Stein; Park Geun-tae	#Cookie Jar	
"Color of Love"	2022	Natsumi Kobayashi; Ashley Alisha; Hyuk Shin; JJ Evans; Hong Young-in; Jun Byoung-sun	Bloom	
"Jackpot"	2022	UME; Alysa; Carlyle Cosmas Savio Fernandes; Nermin Harambašić; JinByJin; Ronny Svendsen; Anne Judith Stokke Wik	Bloom	
"Marionette"	2022	Kenji Toyosaki; Ashley Alisha; Hyuk Shin; JJ Evans; Hong Young-in; Jun Byoung-sun	Bloom	
"Sappy"	2019	MEG.ME; Maria Marcus; Andreas Oberg; Emyli	Sappy	
"Sayonara"	2019	Daisuke Nojima; Shin Hyuk; Kyum Lyk; Ashley Alisha	Sappy	
"Snap Snap"	2022	H.Toyosaki; Ellen Berg; Cazzi Opeia; Alexander Karlsson; Alexej Viktorovich	Bloom	
"Swimming Pool"	2019	Hidenori Tanaka; Didrik Thott; Sean Alexander; Daren "Baby Dee Beats" Smith	Sappy	
"Wildside"	2022	Boyhood; Deez; Yunsu Kim; Anne Judith Stokke Wik	Bloom	
