= Red Room (tour) =

2017–18 concert tour by Red Velvet

Red Room Tour
- Tour by Red Velvet
- Associated album: The Red Summer
- Start date: August 18, 2017
- End date: June 8, 2018
- No. of shows: 3 in South Korea; 10 in Japan; 13 total
- Attendance: 52,000

Red Velvet concert chronology
- Red Room (2017–18); Redmare (2018–19)

Red Room was the first concert tour headlined by South Korean girl group Red Velvet, in support of their first special extended play The Red Summer (2017). The tour is the group's first concert in three years since their debut.

== Background ==
On July 4, 2017, through a press release, SM Entertainment revealed that Red Velvet would be holding their first ever solo concert titled "Red Room" for two nights on August 19 and 20. Tickets for the two shows sold-out in seconds which caused the website to crash. Due to high demand, one additional show was added and to be held on August 18.

In Japan, the first show of Red Velvet's Japanese hall tour was held on May 25, 2018, at Marine Messe Fukuoka, in Fukuoka, Japan. SM Entertainment has decided to hold a hall tour on six cities in Japan in response to the flood of applications referring to the group performing in the country. This is the first nationwide hall tour with eight performances at six locations in Japan, starting in the Wakuwaku Holiday Hall in Sapporo, Hokkaido on May 25, ahead of the release of Red Velvet's first Japanese mini album #Cookie Jar on July 4.

== Critical reception ==
The Red Room received generally favorable reviews from critics. Kim Soo-jung from No Cut News praised the clear concepts, good songs, and vibrancy of the concert for its "peculiar bizarreness and exciting and lively interaction with fans". Yoo Byung-chul from The Korea Economic Daily described the concert as "splendidly staged" further praising the concepts for being able to "maximize the atmosphere of the performance". Park Dong-sun from The Electronic Times described Red Velvet's concert as "somewhat disappointing" but called it as a "great concert with a high level of communication to fans".

== Set lists ==
This set list was performed at the August 20 concert held at the Olympic Hall in Seoul. It does not represent all shows throughout the tour.

Set list in Seoul
1. "Red Dress"
2. "Happily Ever After"
3. "Rookie"
4. "Huff n Puff"
5. "Lady's Room"
6. "Talk To Me"
7. "Don't U Wait No More"
8. "Oh Boy"
9. "Dumb Dumb"
10. "Baby Shark" (Pinkfong cover)
11. "Hear The Sea"
12. "Campfire"
13. "Zoo"
14. "Little Little"
15. "Last Love" (Wendy's solo)
16. "Be Natural" (S.E.S. cover)
17. "Cool Hot Sweet Love"
18. "Automatic"
19. "One of These Nights"
20. "Ice Cream Cake"
21. "Russian Roulette" (Remix)
22. "You Better Know" (Remix)
23. "Red Flavor" (Extended ver.)
  Encore
24. "Cool World"
25. "Happiness"
26. "Candy"

This setlist does not represent all shows throughout the tour.

Set list in Japan
1. "Red Dress"
2. "Happily Ever After"
3. "Rookie"
4. "Huff n Puff"
5. "Lady's Room"
6. "Talk To Me"
7. "Don't U Wait No More"
8. "Oh Boy"
9. "Dumb Dumb" (Japanese version)
10. "Baby Shark" (Pinkfong cover)
11. "Hear The Sea"
12. "Campfire"
13. "Zoo"
14. "Little Little"
15. "Last Love" (Wendy's solo)
16. "Be Natural" (S.E.S. cover)
17. "Cool Hot Sweet Love"
18. "Automatic"
19. "#Cookie Jar"
20. "Russian Roulette" (Japanese version)
21. "You Better Know" (Remix)
22. "Red Flavor" (Japanese version)
  Encore
23. "Peek-a-Boo"
24. "'Cause It's You"

== Tour dates ==
List of concert dates
Date	City	Country	Venue	Attendance
August 18, 2017	Seoul	South Korea	Olympic Hall	12,000
August 19, 2017	Seoul	South Korea	Olympic Hall	12,000
August 20, 2017	Seoul	South Korea	Olympic Hall	12,000
March 28, 2018	Tokyo	Japan	Musashino Forest Sport Plaza	20,000
March 29, 2018	Tokyo	Japan	Musashino Forest Sport Plaza	20,000
May 25, 2018	Sapporo	Japan	Wakuwaku Holiday Hall	20,000
May 27, 2018	Ichinomiya	Japan	Ichinomiya City Hall	20,000
May 30, 2018	Hiroshima	Japan	JMS Aster Plaza Great Hall	20,000
June 1, 2018	Fukuoka	Japan	Fukuoka International Conference Hall	20,000
June 4, 2018	Osaka	Japan	Orix Theater	20,000
June 5, 2018	Osaka	Japan	Orix Theater	20,000
June 7, 2018	Yokohama	Japan	Pacifico Yokohama	20,000
June 8, 2018	Yokohama	Japan	Pacifico Yokohama	20,000
Estimated total				52,000

== Television broadcast ==
Television premiere date, country of broadcast, title of program, date filmed, and location filmed
Premiere date	Country	Channel	Program title	Recording date	Recording location	Ref.
July 22, 2018	Japan	Wowow	Red Velvet 1st Concert "Red Room" in JAPAN	March 29, 2018	Musashino Forest Sports Plaza	

== Personnel ==
Adapted from Red Room Kihno Video

Performer

- Red Velvet – Irene, Seulgi, Wendy, Joy, Yeri

Tour staff

- Kim Sung-hak – executive supervisor
- Lee Yeo-kyung – planning, management
- Lee Seung-chun – planning, management
- Kwon Hye-ji – contents advisor
- Ahn Eun-ok – management
- Kim Kyung-sun – management
- Lee Bo-seul – management
- Do Hyun-chang – management
- Kim Ji-yeon – management
- Park Diana – management
- Ma Kyung-bin – ticket and accounting
- Ahn Hyun-joo – ticket and accounting
- Noh Yoon-ji – ticket and accounting
- Lee Young-ah – ticket and accounting
- Wi Jung-soo – ticket and accounting

Stage creative staff

- Kim Sung-hak – executive supervisor
- Lee Yeo-kyung – planning, management
- Lee Seung-chun – planning, management
- Kwon Hye-ji – contents advisor
- Ahn Eun-ok – management
- Kim Kyung-sun – management
- Lee Bo-seul – management
- Do Hyun-chang – management
- Kim Ji-yeon – management
- Park Diana – management
- Ma Kyung-bin – ticket and accounting
- Ahn Hyun-joo – ticket and accounting
- Noh Yoon-ji – ticket and accounting
- Lee Young-ah – ticket and accounting
- Wi Jung-soo – ticket and accounting
- Lee Yeon-geun – production manager
- Tak Young-joon – choreography direction
- Hong Sung-yong – choreography direction
- Jae Shim – choreography direction, choreographer
- Hwang Mi-ri – dancer
- Yoo Seul-gi – dancer
- Kim Hyun-i – dancer
- Jeong Sun-min – dancer
- Ryu So-hee – choreographer
- Choi Young-joon – choreographer
- Bae Hyo-jung – choreographer
- Jin Hyun-ho – choreographer
- Ahn Sang-jin – choreographer
- Lee Da-bin – choreographer
- Lee Joon-woo – choreographer
- Choi Won-jun – choreographer
- Park Sung-ryeong – choreographer
- Eum Bi-ryang – stage director and designer
- Cho Hyun-hak – stage director and designer
- Seo Jung-min – stage director and designer
- Jung Kyung-ho – stage
- Kim Bong-ryong – stage
- Yoon Tae-hyun – stage
- Ahn Ki-hyun – stage set
- Park Byung-yoon – stage set
- Yoon Joo-il – stage construction
- Yeo In-wan – stage construction
- Lee Ji-hong – manipulator
- Seo Eun-kyung – live sound engineering
- Cho Seung-je – live sound engineering
- Bae Sang-heon – live sound engineering
- Lee Jang-kyun – live sound engineering
- Kim Min-ji – live sound engineering
- Kim Myung-soo – lighting
- Jung Yu-seok – lighting
- Lim Young-eun – lighting
- Kim Ki-jung – neon
- Kim Ying-jae – neon
- Oh Seung-min – neon
- Ji Eun-seok – layher
- Kim In-joong – layher
- Shin Won-kyun – layher
