= Bloom (Red Velvet album) =

- Digital and Regular edition cover

Studio album by Red Velvet
- Released: April 6, 2022
- Genre: J-pop
- Length: 36:59
- Languages: Japanese; English
- Label: Avex Trax

Red Velvet chronology
The ReVe Festival 2022 – Feel My Rhythm (2022)	Bloom (2022)	The ReVe Festival 2022 – Birthday (2022)

Singles from Bloom
- 1. "Wildside" Released: March 28, 2022

Bloom is the first Japanese studio album (third overall) by South Korean girl group Red Velvet. It was released on April 6, 2022, through Avex Trax. Bloom is Red Velvet's first studio album released in four years and five months after the group's second Korean studio album Perfect Velvet (2017).

== Background and release ==
On December 10, 2021, it was announced that Red Velvet would be releasing their first Japanese studio album, Bloom. The album will mark the girl group's first Japanese release in almost two years, following the May 2019 extended play (EP) Sappy, which featured the singles "Sappy" and "Sayonara". Five of Bloom's eleven tracks are new, including the lead single "Wildside". In addition to the digest video of the premium event Red Velvet ReVeluv-Baby Party held in 2019, the first production limited edition DVD and Blu-ray will include footage of previous activities in Japan, live videos from A-Nation, and behind-the-scenes videos of the album shoot. Each member also created individualized shots with "special" designs for the release.

The album was initially set to be released on February 2, 2022, but postponed due to production issues, with no new release date stated. By March 12, the group opened their official Japanese Twitter account and announced that Bloom would be released on April 6. A content schedule was also posted, indicating that the gradual release of various promotional content for the album. The lead single was released on March 28, ahead of the album itself.

== Composition ==
The lead single, "Wildside", is a "cool" and "seductive" song "unique" to Red Velvet, and the lyrics contain a message that they will support themselves who do not give up to reach where they want to go. "Marionette" samples a xylophone signature line from the classic song, "The Nutcracker". "Jackpot" is a song described for its "exciting" atmosphere. "Snap Snap" expresses an era that relies on social media. "Color of Love" is a song described for its "charming" and "soft" melody. In addition, there are a total of 11 existing songs including "Sappy", "#Cookie Jar", "Sayonara", "Aitai-tai", "Swimming Pool", and "Cause It's You".

== Commercial performance ==
Bloom debuted at number five on Japan's weekly Oricon Albums Chart in the chart issue dated April 4–10, 2022. It also peaked at number two on the component daily Albums Chart. The album debuted at number two on Billboard Japan Hot Albums in the chart issue dated April 7–13, 2022. Additionally, it also debuted at numbers 41 and two on the component Download Albums and Top Albums Sales in the chart issue dated April 7–13, 2022.

== Track listing ==
Bloom track listing
No.	Title	Lyrics	Music	Arrangement	Length
1.	"Marionette"	Kenji Toyosaki	Alysa; Andy Love		3:48
2.	"Wildside"	Boyhood	Deez; Yunsu Kim; Anne Judith Stokke Wik		3:49
3.	"Sappy"	MEG.ME	Maria Marcus; Andreas Öberg; Emyli	Andreas Öberg; Emyli	3:19
4.	"Jackpot"	UME	Alysa; Carlyle Cosmas Savio Fernandes; Nermin Harambašić; JinByJin; Ronny Vidar Svendsen; Anne Judith Stokke Wik		3:02
5.	"#Cookie Jar"	MEG.ME	Efraim Faramir Sixten Fransesco Vindalf Cederqvist Leo; Mats Koray Genc; Gavin Jones; Saima Irén Mian; Ronny Vidar Svendsen; Anne Judith Wik; Nermin Harambašić	Dsign Music; Efraim Faramir Sixten Fransesco Vindalf Cederqvist Leo	3:33
6.	"Snap Snap"	H.Toyosaki	Ellen Berg; Cazzi Opeia; Alexander Karlsson; Alexej Viktorovitch		3:23
7.	"Sayonara"	Daisuke Nojima ( Agehasprings)	Hyuk Shin (Joombas); Kyum Lyk (Joombas); Ashley Alisha (Joombas); JJ Evans (Joombas)	Joombas	3:15
8.	"Aitai-tai"	H.Toyosaki; Hyun Hwang (MonoTree)	Hyun Hwang (MonoTree)	MonoTree	3:14
9.	"Swimming Pool"	Hidenori Tanaka; (Agehasprings)	Didrik Thott; Sean Alexander (Avenue 52); Daren "Baby Dee Beats" Smith	Avenue 52	3:20
10.	"'Cause It's You"	Izumi Soratani (Agehasprings)	Anne Judith Wik; Ronny Vidar Svendsen; Nermin Harambašić; Jin Suk Choi; Justin Stein; Park Geun-tae	Dsign Music	2:59
11.	"Color of Love"	Natsumi Kobayashi	Ashley Alisha; Hyuk Shin; JJ Evans; Hong Young-in (Royal Dive); Jun Byoung-sun (Royal Dive)		3:07
Total length:					36:59

Bloom – DVD and Blu-ray
No.	Title	Length
1.	"Red Velvet "ReVeluv-Baby Party 2019" Digest"
2.	"Red Velvet Making of Japan"
3.	"A-Nation Best Selection"
4.	"Bloom Jacket Making Clip"

=== Notes ===
- "Wildside" and "Sappy" are stylized in all caps.
- "Cause It's You" is stylized in sentence case.
- "Marionette" samples a xylophone signature line from Tchaikovsky's "The Nutcracker".

== Charts ==
=== Weekly charts ===
Weekly chart performance for Bloom
Chart (2022)	Peak position
Japanese Albums (Oricon)	5
Japanese Hot Albums (Billboard Japan)	2

=== Monthly charts ===
Monthly chart performance for Bloom
Chart (2022)	Peak position
Japanese Albums (Oricon)	11

=== Year-end charts ===
Year-end chart performance for Bloom
Chart (2022)	Position
Japan Top Album Sales (Billboard Japan)	94

== Release history ==
Release history for Bloom
Region	Date	Format(s)	Label(s)	Ref.
Various	April 6, 2022	CD; DVD; digital download; streaming	Avex Trax	
