= The Red Summer (EP) =

- Artwork for digital copies and back cover of album

EP by Red Velvet
- Released: July 9, 2017
- Studios: SM Studio (Seoul, South Korea)
- Genres: Pop; dance-pop; EDM; tropical house
- Length: 17:11
- Languages: Korean; English
- Labels: SM; KT; Dreamus
- Producers: Kenzie; Caesar & Loui; Becky Jerams; Pontus Persson; Kanata Okajima; LDN Noise; Courtney Jenaé Stahl; Alice Penrose; Johannes Josh Jorgensen; Lars Halvor Jensen; Hwang-hyun

Red Velvet chronology
Rookie (2017)	The Red Summer (2017)	Perfect Velvet (2017)

Singles from The Red Summer
- 1. "Red Flavor" Released: July 9, 2017

Other cover
- Physical version cover

The Red Summer is the first special extended play (fifth overall) by South Korean girl group Red Velvet. Marketed as the group's first "special summer" release, the five-track EP was released digitally on July 9, 2017, and physically the following day by SM Entertainment. Primarily a dance-pop and EDM record, it is the second major release from Red Velvet to focus solely on their "red" concept, following their debut studio album The Red (2015). It was later proceeded by Summer Magic (2018) and Velvet Summer (2026) as the second and third "special summer" extended plays.

The Red Summer received positive reviews from music critics, who complimented its showcasing of the group's "bright and vivid" side. It was a commercial success, becoming the group's sixth consecutive Gaon Album Chart topper and their third to debut atop the Billboard World Albums chart, thus setting the record for the most number-one albums among K-pop girl groups at the time. The EP spawned the single "Red Flavor", and has since become one of the group's signature songs.

== Background and release ==
After concluding music show promotion for their fourth extended play Rookie in February, Red Velvet released the digital single "Would U" as the first release for the second season of the label project SM Station. On June 23, 2017, S.M. Entertainment announced that Red Velvet would be releasing an album in July for a summer comeback (a first for the group) and had recently finished filming the music video. At around midnight on June 30, the first set of teaser images were released through the company's official website, the group's official Instagram, and the group's promotional Twitter account, which was created the same month. Later that day, they posted another set of teasers which revealed the album title and the full track list which includes the title track, "Red Flavor". The album was officially released digitally on July 9 and physically on July 10, and was distributed by Genie Music. The physical album was released in two formats: a CD version and Kihno kit.

== Composition ==
The Red Summer consists of five songs that incorporate genres like dance-pop and EDM. The lead single "Red Flavor" was described by writer Tamar Herman of Billboard magazine as an electropop song with "dramatic synths and a percussive melody." Originally produced by production team Caesar & Loui, the track features background vocals from songwriter Ylva Dimberg and a distorted lyrics "red flavor" done by Lindell himself. It was later rewritten in Korean by SM songwriter and producer Kenzie, whom had previously worked with the group on their first studio album and their third extended play. Jeff Benjamin of Fuse magazine described the song as a "super-simple-to-swallow piece of pop" and wrote that the album consists of five 'feel-good' tracks. "You Better Know" is a warm EDM song. The tropical dance track "Zoo" is a throwback to the group's animal sound-infused debut single "Happiness". "Mojito" was defined as a saccharine, glossy, electropop song and lastly, "Hear the Sea" is a mid-tempo R&B track.

== Reception ==
Professional ratings
Review scores
Source	Rating
IZM	3/5 stars
The Star	8/10
The 405	8/10

While Tamar Herman of Billboard, Jeff Benjamin of Fuse magazine and Chase McMullen of The 405 praised the title track and EP for its summery vibe, with McMullen giving the EP an 8/10 and Hermann commenting on its "dynamic in its jam-packed but not overpowering production" while concluding that it is "sure to be one of the summer's K-pop earworms", Lee Gi-seon of IZM magazine was more neutral and gave the EP 3 out of 5 stars, but had a more positive response to the single "Red Flavor". Chester Chin of The Star described the album as a "sizzling affair that highlights the girl group's more vivid and upbeat side".

The Red Summer claimed the no.1 spot on the South Korean Gaon Album Chart on the third week of July, with the title track "Red Flavor" topping both the Gaon Digital Chart and the Gaon Download Chart. All five tracks from the EP also debuted in the Top 50 of the Digital Chart: "Red Flavor" (no. 1), "You Better Know" (no. 14), "Zoo" (no. 24), "Mojito" (no. 32) and "Hear The Sea" (no. 35).

The Red Summer marks the third time the group has topped Billboard's World Albums chart, making them, at the time, the K-pop girl group with the most no. 1 albums on the chart. The record was tied by their label mate Girls' Generation in August of the same year but was once again beaten by Red Velvet with the release of their second studio album Perfect Velvet in November. According to the site, the EP sold over 1,000 copies within the week, making it at the time the group's best US sales week. It also entered Billboard's Top Heatseekers Albums Chart at no. 8, the first time the group has charted in the Top 10. The album also peaked at no. 25 on Billboard's Independent Albums which is the first time the group entered the chart. In Japan, it debuted at no. 27 on the Oricon Albums Chart, which was also their highest-peaking position at the time.

== Promotion ==
The single "Red Flavor" had an unconventional release and was performed live by the group at an SMTOWN concert in Seoul on July 8 before the song's digital release along with its music video a day later. 10 minutes after its release on July 9, the group had their first music show performance on Inkigayo where they also performed "You Better Know". They continued appearing on several music shows such as The Show, M Countdown, Music Bank and Show Champion where they earned their first music show trophy for "Red Flavor" on July 20, 2017.

== Track listing ==
The Red Summer track listing
No.	Title	Lyrics	Music	Arrangement	Length
1.	"Red Flavor" (Korean: 빨간 맛; RR: Ppalgan mat)	Kenzie	Daniel Caesar; Ludwig Lindell	Caesar & Loui	3:11
2.	"You Better Know"	Lee Seu-ran; JQ (MUMW); Choi Ji-hye (MUMW)	Becky Jerams; Pontus Persson; Kanata Okajima	Pontus Persson	4:10
3.	"Zoo"	Lee Seu-ran	Greg Bonnick; Hayden Chapman; Courtney Jenaé Stahl; Alice Penrose	LDN Noise	3:24
4.	"Mojito" (Korean: 여름빛; RR: Yeoreumbit; lit. 'Summer Light')	JQ (MUMW); Hyun Ji-won (MUMW)	Johannes "Josh" Jørgensen; Lars Halvor Jensen; Marissa Jack	Johannes "Josh" Jørgensen; Lars Halvor Jensen	3:04
5.	"Hear the Sea" (Korean: 바다가 들려; RR: Badaga deullyeo)	Hwang Hyun (MonoTree)	Hwang Hyun (MonoTree)	Hwang Hyun (MonoTree)	3:22
Total length:					17:18

== Personnel ==
Credits adapted from the liner notes of The Red Summer.

- S.M. Entertainment Co., Ltd. – executive producer
- Lee Soo-man – producer
- Lee Seong-soo – producing director
- Jeong Eui-seok (S.M. Blue Cup Studio) – recording engineer
- Lee Ji-hong (S.M. LYVIN Studio) – recording engineer
- Lee Min-gyu (S.M. Big Shot Studio) – recording engineer
- Yoo Ji-sang (MonoTree Studio) – recording engineer
- Hwang Hyun (MonoTree Studio) – recording engineer
- Jeong Eun-kyeong (In Grid Studio) – recording engineer
- Ahn Chang-kyu (doobdoob Studio) – recording engineer
- On Seong-yoon (sound POOL Studios) – recording engineer
- Jeong Ki-hong (Seoul Studio) – recording engineer
- Ji Yong-joo (Seoul Studio) – recording engineer assistant
- Nam Koong-jin (S.M. Concert Hall Studio) – mixing engineer
- Koo Jong-pil (Beat Burger) (S.M. Yellow Tail Studio) – mixing engineer
- Kim Cheol-soon (S.M. Blue Ocean Studio) – mixing engineer
- Jeong Ui-seok (S.M. Blue Cup Studio) – mixing engineer
- Chris Gehringer (Sterling Sound) – master engineer
- Min Hee-jin – creative director
- Min Hee-jin – music video direction and arrangement
- Kim Ju-young – music video direction and arrangement
- Park Yoon-seon – music video direction and arrangement
- Seong Chang-won – music video director
- Jo Woo-cheol – art direction and design
- Cho Woo-shik – art direction and design
- Kim Ye-jin – stylist
- Yoon Seo-ha – hair stylist
- Soon-ee – hair stylist
- Shin Kyung-mi – make-up artist
- Song Si-young – photography
- Kim Young-min – executive supervisor
- Red Velvet – vocals, Polaroid photography
  - Irene – vocals, Polaroid photography
  - Seulgi – vocals, Polaroid photography
  - Wendy – vocals, Polaroid photography
  - Joy – vocals, Polaroid photography
  - Yeri – vocals, Polaroid photography

== Charts ==
=== Weekly charts ===
Chart (2017)	Peak position
French Digital Albums (SNEP)	108
Japanese Albums (Oricon)	27
South Korean Albums (Gaon)	1
US Top Heatseekers Albums (Billboard)	8
US Independent Albums (Billboard)	25
US World Albums (Billboard)	1

=== Monthly charts ===
Chart (2017)	Peak position
South Korean Albums (Gaon)	4

== Release history ==
Region	Date	Format	Label
South Korea	July 9, 2017	digital download; streaming	SM Entertainment; Genie Music
Various	July 9, 2017	digital download; streaming	SM Entertainment
South Korea	July 10, 2017	CD; SMC	SM Entertainment; Genie Music
