= Courtney Jenaé =

American singer-songwriter

Courtney Jenaé Stahl
- Born: Courtney Jeanné Woolsey; June 20; Fountain Valley, California, United States
- Genres: Pop; Dance; EDM
- Occupations: Singer; songwriter
- Instrument: Vocals
- Years active: 2011–present
- Labels: Sony Music Publishing

Courtney Jenaé Stahl is an American, Los Angeles-based, singer and songwriter. Her songs are published by Sony Music Publishing .

Courtney Jenaé co-wrote "Paradise" for Girls' Generation's album, Lion Heart, which reached No. 1 on Billboard's World Albums Chart.

She also co-wrote Exo’s 2015 single "Love Me Right" which went platinum in the first week. She has written songs for numerous artists including "Bad Case Of U" for Bella Thorne, which was featured in Alvin and the Chipmunks: The Road Chip, "Shake That Brass" by Amber, "Magnetic" by Elliott Yamin, "Crush" by I.O.I, and "Tuk Tok" by Twice.

Woolsey co-wrote and was featured on two Blasterjaxx singles, "You Found Me" released by Spinnin’ Records and "Forever" released by Dim Mak.

== Discography ==
=== As featured artist ===
- 2014: Blasterjaxx – "You Found Me" feat. Courtney Jenaé (single) [Spinnin’ Records]
- 2015: Blasterjaxx – "Forever" feat. Courtney Jenaé (single) [Dim Mak Records]
- 2020: Eurovision Song Contest: The Story of Fire Saga – "Running With The Wolves" feat. Courtney Jenaé (album) [Arista Records]

=== Writing credits ===
Year	Artist	Song	Album	Label
2012	Courtney Jenaé	"Dirty Angel"	Non-album single	Wondr Music
2014	Blasterjaxx	"You Found Me"	Non-album single	Spinnin' Records
2015	Blasterjaxx	"Forever"	Non-album single	Dim Mak Records
2015	Amber	"Shake That Brass"	Beautiful	SM Entertainment
2015	Miss A	"Melting"	Colors	JYP Entertainment
2015	Exo	"Love Me Right"	Love Me Right	SM Entertainment
2015	Girls' Generation	"Paradise"	Lion Heart	SM Entertainment
2015	Elliott Yamin	"Magnetic"	As Time Goes By	Avex Inc.
2015	Bella Thorne	"Bad Case of U"	Mostly Ghostly: Have You Met My Ghoulfriend?	Back Lot Music
2015	Girls' Generation-TTS	"I Like The Way"	Dear Santa	SM Entertainment
2016	I.O.I	"Crush"	Chrysalis	Stone Music Entertainment
2016	Twice	"Tuk Tok"	Page Two	JYP Entertainment
2016	E-girls	"Pink Champagne"	E.G. Crazy	Avex Inc.
2016	Red Velvet	"Bad Dracula"	Russian Roulette	SM Entertainment
2017	Red Velvet	"Happily Ever After"	Rookie	SM Entertainment
2017	Taeyeon	"Feel So Fine"	My Voice	SM Entertainment
2017	Girl's Day	"Don't Be Shy"	Girl's Day Everyday No. 5	DreamTea Entertainment
2017	Kat Dahlia	"Sirens"	TBA	Epic Records
2017	Red Velvet	"Zoo"	The Red Summer	SM Entertainment
2018	Rainz	"Turn it Up"	Shake You Up	Kiss Entertainment
2018	Annie LeBlanc	"Picture This"	Non-album single	—
2018	Red Velvet	"Mr. E"	Summer Magic	SM Entertainment
2018	Oh My Girl	"Echo"	Remember Me	WM Entertainment
2018	Indiana Massara	"In Your Dreams"	Non-album single	—
2019	Taeyeon	"I Found You"	Voice	SM Entertainment
2019	Red Velvet	"Love Is The Way"	The ReVe Festival: Day 2	SM Entertainment
2020	Koda Kumi	"Lucky Star"	Angel + Monster	Rhythm Zone
2021	Fromis 9	"Talk & Talk"	Non-album single	Pledis Entertainment
2023	Nana (Woo!ah!), Suyun (Rocket Punch), Yeonhee (Rocket Punch), Wooyeon (Woo!ah!), Yuki (Purple Kiss), Jihan (Weeekly), Kei (Lovelyz)	"Billionaire"	Queendom Puzzle Final	Stone Music Entertainment
2023	El7z Up	"Cheeky"	7+Up	Apple Monster, DG Entertainment
2025	NiziU	"Made of Love"	AWAKE	JYP Entertainment
