= Velvet Summer =

- Digital cover

EP by Red Velvet
- Released: August 3, 2026
- Length: 15:16
- Languages: Korean; English
- Labels: SM; Kakao

Red Velvet chronology
Cosmic (2024)	Velvet Summer (2026)

Singles from Velvet Summer
- 1. "Surfin' Boy" Released: August 3, 2026

Professional ratings
Review scores
Source	Rating
IZM	3.5/5 stars

Velvet Summer is the seventh special extended play and sixteenth overall (Note: When combined with Korean-language and Japanese-language EPs) by South Korean girl group Red Velvet. It was released by SM Entertainment on August 3, 2026, and contains five tracks, including the lead single "Surfin' Boy". Marketed as a "summer" release, Velvet Summer is Red Velvet's third seasonal extended play following The Red Summer (2017) and Summer Magic (2018).

== Background and release ==
On June 15, 2026, SM Entertainment announced that Red Velvet would be releasing a new album in August 2026. On July 6, it was announced that the group would be releasing an extended play titled Velvet Summer on August 3. On July 27, the highlight medley video was released. Four days later, the music video teaser for "Surfin' Boy" was released. The extended play was released alongside the music video for "Surfin' Boy" on August 3.

== Composition ==
Velvet Summer contains five tracks. The lead single, "Surfin' Boy", is a dance song characterized by "bossanova guitar, reggae rhythms, and house groove" with lyrics that "reminisce about the hottest summer spent with a loved one and the creation of a brilliant memory". The second track, "Hot Girls Cold Vibe", is a pop dance track characterized by "bass rhythm, guitar sounds, and beat progression" with lyrics about the "cool and confident energy of hot girls enjoying a summer night drive". The third track, "Orchestra", samples "Lujon", a composition by American film music composer Henry Mancini, with lyrics about the "unfolding emotional changes of two characters falling in love on a deepening summer night, akin to an orchestral performance".

The fourth track, "Hula Hoop", is a medium-tempo pop song with "fairy tale" lyrics about the "precious bond that eventually comes full circle and a reunion brought about by fate". The last track, "Hawaii", is an acoustic pop song with lyrics "calmly depict setting aside the weight of a weary reality and heavy worries for a moment and rediscovering the pure freedom dreamed of as a child, as if one were actually in Hawaii".

== Track listing ==
Velvet Summer track listing
No.	Title	Lyrics	Music	Arrangement	Length
1.	"Surfin' Boy"	Joy	Soulkidd (The Hub); Honey Noise (The Hub); Kwon Ae-jin (MonoTree); Ikki	Soulkidd (The Hub); Honey Noise (The Hub)	2:48
2.	"Hot Girls Cold Vibe"	Kenzie	Kenzie; Ronny Svendsen; Adrian Thesen; Anne Judith Wik; Bobii Lewis	Kenzie; Ronny Svendsen; Pizzapunk	3:39
3.	"Orchestra"	Hwang Hyun (MonoTree)	Aftrshok (The Hub); Bluar (The Hub); Iris (MonoTree); Chanti (The Hub); Henry Mancini	Aftrshok (The Hub); Bluar (The Hub)	2:57
4.	"Hula Hoop"	Jo Yoon-kyung	Matilda Thompson; Max Wolfgang; Litens Anton Rilsson; Ahrnberg	Ahrnberg	2:33
5.	"Hawaii"	Joy	Lewis Gardiner; Ryan Lawrie; Emily Middlemas	Lewis Gardinder	3:18
Total length:					15:16

== Credits and personnel ==
Credits adapted from EP's liner notes.

=== Studios ===
- SM Aube – recording (track 1, 3–5), digital editing (track 1–2, 4)
- SM Droplet – recording (track 1–2, 5)
- SM Azure – recording, digital editing (track 3)
- SM Dorii – digital editing (track 5)
- SM Blue Ocean – mixing (track 1)
- SM Blue Cup – mixing (track 2)
- SM Concert Hall – mixing (track 3)
- SM Big Shot – mixing (track 4)
- SM Starlight – mixing (track 5)
- Sterling Sound – mastering (all tracks)

=== Personnel ===
- SM Entertainment – executive producer
- Red Velvet – vocals, background vocals (all tracks)
  - Joy – lyrics (track 1, 5)
- Soulkidd (The Hub) – producer, composition, arrangement, background vocals (track 1)
- Honey Noise (The Hub) – producer, composition, arrangement (track 1)
- Kwon Ae-jin (MonoTree) – composition, background vocals (track 1)
- Ikki – composition, background vocals (track 1)
- Kenzie – producer, lyrics, composition, arrangement, vocal directing (track 2)
- Ronny Svendsen – producer, composition, arrangement (track 2)
- Adrian Thesen a.k.a. Pizzapunk – producer, composition, arrangement (track 2)
- Anne Judith Wik – composition, background vocals (track 2)
- Bobii Lewis – composition, background vocals (track 2)
- Hwang Hyun (MonoTree) – lyrics (track 3)
- Aftrshok (The Hub) – producer, composition, arrangement, drums, bass, synthesizer (track 3)
- Bluar (The Hub) – producer, composition, arrangement, drums, bass, synthesizer (track 3)
- Iris (MonoTree) – composition, vocal directing (track 3)
- Chanti (The Hub) – composition, background vocals (track 3)
- Henry Mancini – composition (track 3)
- Jo Yoon-kyung – lyrics (track 4)
- Matilda Thompson – composition, background vocals (track 4)
- Max Wolfgang – composition (track 4)
- Litens Anton Rilsson – composition (track 4)
- Ahrnberg – producer, composition, arrangement (track 4)
- Lewis Gardiner – producer, composition, arrangement (track 5)
- Ryan Lawrie – composition (track 5)
- Emily Middlemas a.k.a. Ili – composition, background vocals (track 5)
- Jsong – vocal directing (track 1, 5)
- Ondine – vocal directing (track 4)
- Wonjun – guitar (track 3)
- Kim Eun-min – additional violin (track 3)
- Kim Hyo-joon – recording (track 1, 3–5), digital editing (track 1–2, 4)
- Kim Joo-hyun – recording (track 1–2, 5)
- Kim Jae-yeon – recording, digital editing (track 3)
- Jeong Jae-won – digital editing (track 5)
- Kim Cheol-sun – mixing (track 1)
- Jung Eui-seok – mixing (track 2)
- Nam Koong-jin – mixing (track 3)
- Lee Min-kyu – mixing (track 4)
- Jeong Yoo-ra – mixing (track 5)
- Joe LaPorta – mastering (all tracks)

== Charts ==
=== Weekly charts ===
Weekly chart performance for Velvet Summer
Chart (2026)	Peak position
Japanese Albums (Oricon)	27
Japanese Digital Albums (Oricon)	16
Japanese Hot Albums (Billboard Japan)	62
Japanese Western Albums (Oricon)	16
South Korean Albums (Circle)	4

=== Monthly charts ===
Monthly chart performance for Velvet Summer
Chart (2026)	Peak position
South Korean Albums (Circle)	12

== Release history ==
Release history for Velvet Summer
Region	Date	Format	Label
South Korea	August 3, 2026	CD	SM; Kakao
Various	August 3, 2026	Music download; streaming	SM; Kakao
