= Russian Roulette (Red Velvet EP) =

- Digital cover

EP by Red Velvet
- Released: September 7, 2016
- Studios: SM Studios (Seoul, South Korea)
- Genre: Pop
- Length: 24:45
- Languages: Korean; English
- Labels: SM; Dreamus

Red Velvet chronology
The Velvet (2016)	Russian Roulette (2016)	Rookie (2017)

Singles from Russian Roulette
- 1. "Russian Roulette" Released: September 7, 2016

Russian Roulette is the third Korean extended play by South Korean girl group Red Velvet. It was released on September 7, 2016, by SM Entertainment.

The album is the group's second 'Red' and 'Velvet' album, after releasing Ice Cream Cake in 2015. The EP consists of seven tracks, including the lead single "Russian Roulette".

== Background and release ==
Despite earlier reports of Red Velvet having a summer comeback, SM Entertainment announced that the group would release a new album in September. Member and leader Irene talked about the difficulties the group faced while preparing for the album on the September 9 broadcast of the radio show Super Junior's Kiss the Radio and stated that it was "physically and mentally tiring as the comeback date kept getting postponed".

After revealing the first teaser on September 1, SM Entertainment announced that Red Velvet will release their third extended play on September 7, with seven tracks in the album. The album and title track were both titled Russian Roulette.

== Composition ==
The title track "Russian Roulette" is a synth-pop song with arcade sound feel with a retro 8-bit sound source. The song was produced by Albi Albertsson, Belle Humble and Markus Lindell who also had a part in producing their previous album's title track "One of These Nights". Its lyrics compare the process of winning someone's heart with a game of Russian roulette. On the September 13 broadcast of SBS Power FM's radio show Choi Hwa-jung's Power Time, the members revealed that the song was written before they debuted. They heard the song then, when they were still trainees, not realizing they would release it.

"Lucky Girl" is a retro-style dance-pop song produced by Hayley Aitken and Ollipop with lyrics written by Kenzie. "Bad Dracula" was produced by Tomas Smågesjø, Choi Jin-Suk, and Nermin Harambasic from Dsign Music and American singer-songwriter Courtney Jenaé Stahl with lyrics by Jo Yun-gyeong, who also wrote the lyrics of the title track. "Sunny Afternoon" is a 90s throwback, slick song and is produced by Swedish producers Simon Petrén & Andreas Öberg, Maja Keuc and Kim One with Korean lyrics written by Jeong Ju Hee. "Fool" is an acoustic pop song written by January 8 of Jam Factory and composed by Malin Johansson and Josef Melin. "Some Love" is a tropical house song written and produced by Kenzie, while "My Dear" was written and produced by Hwang Hyun of MonoTree.

== Promotion ==
Red Velvet held a special countdown to the release of their album through Naver's V app on September 6, just an hour before the release of "Russian Roulette"'s music video and the album. The group started their music show promotions on September 8, on M! Countdown, performing "Russian Roulette" and "Lucky Girl". This was followed by performances on Music Bank and Inkigayo where they also performed both songs.

== Critical reception ==
Tamar Herman of Billboard wrote that the song was "more saccharine than their typical sound" and described the music video as a "bubbly, athletic-themed music video that offered fun times for all as a murderous ode to The Simpsons' impish duo Itchy and Scratchy." It ranked sixth on 20 Best Kpop Tracks of the Year by Dazed Digital. Taylor Glasby commented that the video "has a sinister combination of sweetness and threat" and called the song "devilishly satisfying".

Bradley Stern of PopCrush called the title track a "perky, retro-sounding electro-pop tune" that was expected from most k-pop idols, and praised the black comedy in the song's music video. He compared it to the film Jawbreaker and said it's "pretty genius".

== Commercial performance ==
The album peaked at No. 2 on Billboard's World Albums Chart and peaked at No. 18 on Heatseekers Albums chart, their highest to date. The title track "Russian Roulette" also charted at No. 2 on World Digital Songs, making it their highest ranking on the chart. The album debuted at no. 1 on South Korea's Gaon Album Chart, with "Russian Roulette" charting at no. 3 on its Weekly Digital Chart, before rising to no. 2 one week later. All of the album's other tracks also charted. "Russian Roulette" became the most-viewed K-pop music video for the month of September in America and worldwide. The album peaked at number 63 on the Billboard Japan Hot Albums for the week of September 19, 2016.

The group won their first music show trophy for "Russian Roulette" on the September 13 broadcast of The Show.

== Track listing ==
Russian Roulette track listing
No.	Title	Lyrics	Music	Arrangement	Length
1.	"Russian Roulette" (러시안 룰렛; Reosian rullet)	Jo Yoon-kyung	Albi Albertsson (Mussashi); Belle Humble; Markus Lindell (TG Publishing)	Albi Albertsson (Mussashi); Belle Humble; Markus Lindell (TG Publishing)	3:31
2.	"Lucky Girl"	Kenzie	Hayley Aitken; Ollipop (The Kennel)	Hayley Aitken; Ollipop (The Kennel)	3:23
3.	"Bad Dracula"	Jo Yoon-kyung	Choi Jin Suk; Nermin Harambašić; Tomas Nerbø Smågesjø; Courtney Jenaé Stahl	Choi Jin Suk	3:08
4.	"Sunny Afternoon"	Jung Joo-hee	Andreas Öberg; Simon Petrén; Maja Keuc; Kim One	Andreas Öberg; Simon Petrén; Maja Keuc; Kim One	4:00
5.	"Fool"	Jeon Ji-eun (January 8th (lalala Studio)); Hwang Seon-jeong (January 8th (lalala Studio)); Kim Jeong-mi (January 8th (lalala Studio))	Malin Johansson (Sons of Sweden); Josef Melin (Songs of Sweden)	Songs of Sweden	3:53
6.	"Some Love"	Kenzie	Kenzie	Kenzie	3:16
7.	"My Dear"	Hyun Hwang (MonoTree)	Hyun Hwang (MonoTree)	Hyun Hwang (MonoTree)	3:34
Total length:					24:51

== Personnel ==
Credits adapted from the liner notes of Russian Roulette.

- Lee Soo-man – producer
- Jeong Eun-kyeong – recording engineer
- Kim Hyun-gon – recording engineer
- Jang Woo-young – recording engineer
- Lee Ji-hong – recording engineer
- Hwang Hyun – recording engineer
- Lee Ju-young – recording engineer
- Choo Dae-kwan – recording engineer assistant
- Nam Koong-jin (SM Concert Hall Studio) – mixing engineer
- Koo Jong-pil (Beat Burger) (SM Yellow Tail Studio) – mixing engineer
- Kim Cheol-soon (SM Blue Ocean Studio) – mixing engineer
- Jeong Ui-seok (SM Blue Cup Studio) – mixing engineer
- Tom Coyne (Sterling Sound) – master engineer
- Min Hee-jin – creative director
- Shin Hee-won – music video director
- Min Hee-jin – design
- Jo Woo-cheol – Graphic design
- Kim Ye-min – Graphic design
- Kim Ju-young – Graphic design
- Kim Han-kyeol – Graphic design
- No Hae-na – stylist
- Jeong Seon-ee – hair stylist
- Kim Ji-young – make-up artist
- Kim Yong-min – executive supervisor
- Red Velvet – vocals
  - Irene – vocals
  - Seulgi – vocals
  - Wendy – vocals
  - Joy – vocals
  - Yeri – vocals

== Charts ==
=== Weekly charts ===
Chart (2016)	Peak position
French Digital Albums (SNEP)	174
Japanese Albums (Oricon)	40
South Korean Albums (Gaon)	1
US Heatseekers Albums (Billboard)	18
US World Albums (Billboard)	2

=== Monthly charts ===
Chart (2016)	Peak position
South Korean Albums (Gaon)	4

== Accolade ==
=== Year-end awards ===
Year	Organization	Award	Result
2017	Golden Disc Awards	Album Bonsang	Nominated

== Release history ==
Region	Date	Format	Label
Various	September 7, 2016	Digital download	SM Entertainment
South Korea	September 7, 2016	CD, digital download	SM Entertainment, KT Music
