= Beautiful (EP) =

EP by Amber
- Released: February 13, 2015
- Recorded: 2014–15
- Genres: K-pop; hip-hop
- Length: 17:14
- Languages: Korean; English
- Label: S.M.
- Producers: Lee Soo-man; Amber J. Liu; Ryan Yoo; Courtney Jenaé Stahl; Nermin Harambasic; Jin Choi; Sean Alexander; Shaun; Genneo

Amber chronology
Beautiful (2015)	Rogue Rouge (2018)

Singles from Beautiful
- 1. "Beautiful" Released: February 9, 2015; 2. "Shake That Brass" Released: February 13, 2015

Beautiful is the debut extended play by American singer and rapper Amber, who is a member of South Korean girl group f(x). The EP was released on February 13, 2015 by S.M. Entertainment.

== Background and release ==
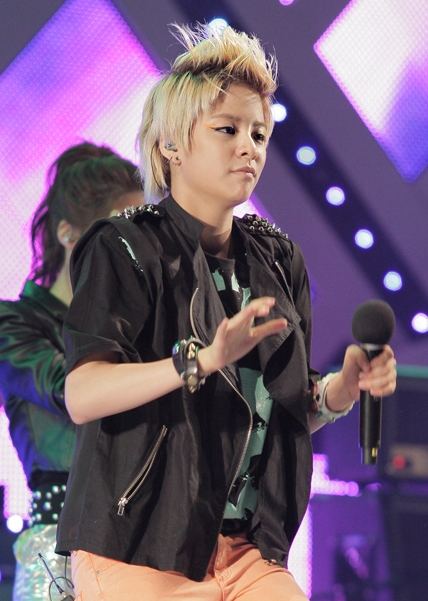
Amber performing in 2011

S.M Entertainment announced the solo debut of Amber on November 30, 2014, revealing that the album is set to be released in February 2015. She is the second after Shinee's Jonghyun to debut as a solo artist among S.M. Entertainment's artists in the year, and the first f(x) member to make their solo debut.

It was revealed that the EP was written and composed by Amber, including the lead single, "Shake That Brass", which features Girls' Generation member Taeyeon. In the February 12 broadcast of SBS Power FM's 'Cultwo Show', Amber revealed that she personally asked the singer if she wanted to be featured in the song.

The music video of 'Shake That Brass' also gained attention for the number of celebrities that were featured in it. Besides Taeyeon, her fellow Girls' Generation member Hyoyeon was also featured, along with Jackson of Got7, Park Joon-hyung of g.o.d, Jia & Min of Miss A, Ellin of Crayon Pop, Brad of Busker Busker, Woori of Rainbow, Aron of NU'EST, Rome of C-Clown, model Irene Kim and comedian Ahn Young-mi.

Days after its release, Beautiful topped Hanteo's overall daily albums chart and also ranked second on the real-time chart. Its music video, which was released the same day as the album's release, also managed to get 1 million hits on YouTube within a day. The album also debuted at #2 on Billboard's World Albums chart, and #19 on Heatseekers Albums. Jeff Benjamin of Billboard K-Town notes that it is a testament to the singer's large international fan base. "Shake That Brass" also debuted at #4 on Billboard's World Digital Songs chart, making it the highest debut of the week.

== Composition ==
The lead single "Shake That Brass", which featured labelmate Taeyeon, has a strong hip-hop beat mixed with playful brass instrumentation. The song was co-composed and co-written by Amber. The EP also includes the tracks, "Love Run" and "Heights".

"Beautiful" was pre-released on February 9, and also had a lyric video which contained childhood photos of Amber uploaded on S.M Entertainment's official YouTube channel on the same day. The song is an acoustic ballad, and its lyrics, written 3 years before its release, tells the story of the hardships the rapper faced as she achieved her dreams of becoming an entertainer.

The last track, "I Just Wanna", is the English version of "Goodbye Summer", a song by f(x), which was included in the group's second studio album, Pink Tape. The song was composed by Amber and Gen Neo of music producer team NoizeBank. Amber used her original English lyrics on the track, with Eric Nam featuring on guest vocals.

== Promotion ==
On February 13, 2015, Beautiful was released digitally in South Korea and globally. Amber made her debut stage on Music Bank on the same day and performed two songs, "Beautiful" and "Shake That Brass" with Red Velvet's Wendy filling in for Taeyeon's parts. The singer also performed the song with fellow f(x) member Luna on Show Champion, M! Countdown, Music Bank, Show! Music Core and Inkigayo.

== Track listing ==
Credits are adapted from Naver.

No.	Title	Lyrics	Music	Arrangement	Length
1.	"Beautiful"	Amber J. Liu; Jam Factory	Amber J. Liu	Amber J. Liu; Ryan Yoo	2:57
2.	"Shake That Brass" (featuring Taeyeon of Girls' Generation)	Amber J. Liu; Rhymer; V-Hawk; Lee Yoo-jin; Kang Ji-eun	Amber J. Liu; Courtney Jenaé Stahl; Nermin Harambasic * Jin Choi	Amber J. Liu; Courtney Jenaé Stahl; Nermin Harambasic * Jin Choi	3:13
3.	"Love Run"	Amber J. Liu; Jakops; Kim Min-ji	Amber J. Liu; Sean Alexander	Amber J. Liu; Shaun	4:08
4.	"Heights"	Amber J. Liu; David Choi	Amber J. Liu; Command Freaks	Amber J. Liu; Command Freaks	3:43
5.	"I Just Wanna" (featuring Eric Nam)	Amber J. Liu	Amber J. Liu; Gen Neo	Gen Neo	3:13
Total length:					17:14

== Charts ==
Chart (2015)	Peak position
South Korea (Gaon)	2
US Billboard World Albums	2
US Heatseekers (Billboard)	19
