= Winter Garden (album) =

Compilation album by BoA, f(x) and Red Velvet
- Released: December 2015
- Recorded: 2015
- Studio: SM Studio, Seoul, South Korea
- Genre: Christmas music; pop; electronic pop; R&B
- Language: Korean
- Label: SM Entertainment
- Producer: Lee Soo-man (exec.); LDN Noise

Singles from Winter Garden
- 1. "Wish List" Released: December 15, 2015; 2. "Wish Tree" Released: December 18, 2015; 3. "Christmas Paradise" Released: December 22, 2015

Music video
- "Wish List" on YouTube "Wish Tree" on YouTube "Christmas Paradise" on YouTube

Winter Garden is a three-track compilation extended play (marketed as a "special winter project") by SM Entertainment, including three different Christmas songs from three female acts of the label, namely BoA, f(x) and Red Velvet. The three singles were released on every four days, starting with "Wish List" by f(x) on December 15, followed by "Wish Tree" by Red Velvet on December 18, and lastly "Christmas Paradise" by BoA on December 22. Three subsequent music videos were released on December 22, under the SMile for U charity project by the label.

== Background ==
SM Entertainment first announced the winter single project via their Twitter account on December 4, with the teaser image showing three numbers, '15', '18' and '22', which eventually became the release date for three subsequent singles from the compilation. The label later confirmed that f(x) would be their first artist to participate in the project. On December 7, another teaser was released, revealing three different letters, 'F', 'R' and 'B' and subsequently represented the last two artists to participate in the project, namely Red Velvet and BoA.

== Singles ==
"Wish List" (Korean: 12시 25분; RR: Yeoldu-si Sibo-bun; lit. "12:25") is an electronic pop song released on December 15 by South Korean girl group f(x). Produced by production duo LDN Noise, the song was their second single to be produced by the duo after "4 Walls" in October 2015. The song peaked at number twenty-one on the Gaon Digital Chart, and stayed on the chart for two weeks.

"Wish Tree" (Korean: 세가지 소원; RR: Segaji Sowon; lit. "Three Wishes") was released as the second single on December 18. Recorded by South Korean girl group Red Velvet. the song is "a pop ballad with a warm feel and an acoustic sound". It debuted and peaked at number thirty-three on the Gaon Digital Chart.

"Christmas Paradise" was recorded by South Korean singer BoA and released as the third and final single from the project on December 22. The song is an R&B-tinged track that "relays a romantic and warm" feeling, while expressing a "happy and cozy" Christmas with a beloved one. The song debuted and peaked at number sixty-seven on the Gaon Digital Chart for one week, earning BoA her fourth top 100 entry on the chart in 2015.

== Promotion ==
SM Entertainment released teasers of the songs through their video sharing application, Everyshot. The company also invited fans to join their Everyshot Winter Garden League event, wherein fans can make videos with the teasers of the three songs they released and upload it through the app. The contest will be held from December 12 to December 31.

To further promote the three singles, f(x)'s Amber & Luna and Red Velvet's Seulgi & Wendy took part in a one-hour show which was broadcast on Naver's V app an hour before Red Velvet's single was released. The four girls discussed their groups' activities in the past year and promoted the singles, including BoA's. Red Velvet also performed "Wish Tree" live on Music Bank on December 25.
