= You Better Know =

Song by Red Velvet

Song by Red Velvet

from the EP The Red Summer
- Language: Korean
- Released: July 9, 2017
- Studio: SM Studios, Seoul, South Korea
- Genre: EDM; dance-pop
- Length: 4:10
- Label: S.M.; Genie
- Songwriters: Lee Seu-ran; JQ; Choi Ji-hye; Becky Jerams; Pontus Persson; Kanata Okajima

Music video
- "You Better Know (Special Video)" on YouTube

"You Better Know" is a song recorded by South Korean girl group Red Velvet for their first special extended play (marketed as a summer mini-album) The Red Summer (2017). The uptempo dance-pop song was written by songwriter Lee Seu-ran of Jam Factory, JQ, Choi Ji-hye, Becky Jerams, Pontus Persson and Japanese musician Kanata Okajima. Upon its release, "You Better Know" received positive reviews from music critics due to its "anthemic" chorus and the group's EDM venture. It also attained commercial success as an album track, peaking at number fourteen on the Gaon Digital Chart and has since become Red Velvet's most successful album track.

== Background and composition ==
Following the release of Red Velvet's fourth extended play Rookie in February, SM Entertainment confirmed through news outlet on June 23, 2017 that the girls would be releasing their first summer release and had recently finished filming a music video. After revealing both the group's image and video teasers, the song was released digitally with its parent album on July 9, 2017 and physically on July 10, 2017.

The song was composed by Becky Jerams, Pontus Persson and Japanese musician Kanata Okajima. Described as a "warm EDM" song, "You Better Know" was produced composed in the key of A major, with a tempo of 120 BPM. Featuring energetic synths and "soaring electrified hook", the song's uplifting lyrics, which were written by Lee Seu-ran of Jam Factory, JQ and Choi Ji-hye, encourage listeners to "get ready" and "not letting go of the moment being".

== Critical reception ==
Upon its release, the song has become a fan-favorite track and received positive reviews from critics. While Lee Gi-seon of IZM magazine chose the track as one of the EP's highlights, Chase McMullen of The 405 website said that the song "slows things down only to build to anthemic chorus". Furthermore, Chester Chin from Star2 praised the song's public-friendliness and presentation of Red Velvet's "dual concept of sweet and sassy", which made the song "an energetic synergy" for K-Pop. In a separated top 25 songs by Red Velvet from Billboard magazine, the song appeared at number fourteen on the list and was noticed for "its foray" into the EDM genre, including "uplifting" lyrics like, “There’s a world that’s been waiting for you as you are.”

== Music video and promotion ==
Due to the massive success of the lead single "Red Flavor" and the song's commercial success, a special clip of the song was uploaded onto the official SMTOWN channel on July 27, 2017 as a gift to fans. The music video, titled "The Red Summer Vacation", uses a shortened version of "You Better Know" and features clips of the members having fun together during their vacation. It has since received more than 1.5 million views, as of November 2017. As part of the EP promotion, "You Better Know" was performed along with the title track during their first promotion week. The shortened version was first performed on SBS Inkigayo on July 9, then Mnet M Countdown and KBS Music Bank. An EDM remix of the song was performed during the group's first concert "Red Room", and later the group performed the song live during their attendance at 2019's The Fact Music Awards. The EDM remix was performed again during the first two nights of their third concert, titled "La Rouge" in November 2019.

== Chart performance ==
The song debuted at number fourteen on the Gaon Digital Chart for the week of July 15, 2017, becoming their ninth top-twenty song and their highest charting entry for an album track to date. With almost 120,000 downloads, "You Better Know" is currently their best selling album track, surpassing the achievement of "Oh Boy" (2015), an album track for their first studio album The Red. In addition, it debuted at number twenty-one on the re-established Billboard K-Pop Hot 100 for the week of July 17, 2017, the highest peak position for an album track of the group. It also charted at number seventy-three on the July issue of the monthly Gaon Digital Chart.

== Credits and personnel ==
Credits adapted from the liner notes of The Red Summer.

- Red Velvet (Irene, Seulgi, Wendy, Joy, Yeri) – vocals, background vocals
- Lee Seu-ran – Korean lyrics
- JQ – Korean lyrics
- Choi Ji-hye – Korean lyrics
- Becky Jerams – original writer, background vocals
- Pontus Persson – original writer, arrangement
- Kanata Okajima – original writer
- Yoo Ji-sang (MonoTree Studio) – vocal director, recording, digital editing
- Jeong Eun-kyung (In Grid Studio) – recording
- Namkoong Jin (SM Concert Hall Studio) – digital editing, mixing

== Charts ==
=== Weekly charts ===
Weekly chart performance for "You Better Know"
Chart (2017)	Peak position
South Korea (Gaon)	14
South Korea (K-pop Hot 100)	21

=== Monthly charts ===
Monthly chart performance for "You Better Know"
Chart (July 2017)	Position
South Korea (Gaon)	73

== Release history ==
Release dates and formats for "You Better Know"
Region	Date	Format	Label	Ref.
Various	July 9, 2017	Digital download; streaming	SM Entertainment; Genie Music	
