= Rookie (EP) =

2017 EP by Red Velvet

- Digital International and Seulgi version cover

EP by Red Velvet
- Released: February 1, 2017
- Studios: SM Studios (Seoul, South Korea)
- Genres: Pop; R&B; funk
- Length: 22:42
- Languages: Korean; English
- Labels: SM; KT; Dreamus

Red Velvet chronology
Russian Roulette (2016)	Rookie (2017)	The Red Summer (2017)

Singles from Rookie
- 1. "Rookie" Released: February 1, 2017

Alternative artwork
- Digital Korean artwork

Rookie is the fourth Korean extended play by South Korean girl group Red Velvet. It was released on February 1, 2017, by SM Entertainment. The album contains six tracks, including its lead single of the same name.

The EP was a commercial success, topping the Gaon Album Chart and Billboard's World Albums.

== Background and release ==
On January 20, 2017, an SM Entertainment representative revealed that Red Velvet is planning on making a comeback in February. Four days later, the first batch of teasers were released through SM Entertainment's official website and their official Instagram account, with the release date shown on one of the photos. The members briefly discussed their upcoming album, revealed to be an extended play, on the Naver app V Live.

The album was released in two formats physically — one being CD and another being Kihno kit. Each format has five different versions of album cover, each featuring a different member.

== Composition ==
Billboard described the title track "Rookie" as a "pop-funk single that draws on Red Velvet's unconventional musicality to combine low-key sing-speaking and synth beats before blasting into the saccharine hook of a chorus". The song was composed by Jamil "Digi" Chammas, Leven Kali, Sara Forsberg, Karl Powell, Harrison Johnson, Russell Steedle, MZMC, Otha "Vakseen" Davis III and Jeremy "Tay" Jasper with lyrics by Jo Yoon-kyung and was produced by The Colleagues.

"Little Little" is an R&B pop song written by Gifty Dankwah & Bruce Fielder and was penned by JQ of Makeumine Works, Jo Mi-yang of Lalala Studio and Park Sung-hee of Jam Factory. "Happily Ever After" is a pop dance track composed by Sebastian Lundberg, Fredrik Häggstam, Johan Gustafsson, Courtney Jenaé Stahl and Deez with lyrics by Song Carat of Jam Factory. "Talk to Me" is a mid-tempo song composed by Kervens Mazile, Annalise Morelli, Alina Smith & Mats Ymell and was penned by Lee Seu-ran of Jam Factory. "Body Talk" is an R&B pop song written by Sebastian Lundberg, Fredrik Häggstam, Johan Gustafsson & Ylva Dimberg with lyrics by Misfit & Jo Yoon-kyung. The last track "Last Love" is a solo by member Wendy with arrangement by Don Spike. It is a remake of a romantic ballad by Eco from their third album which was released in 1999.

== Promotion ==
Hours before the music video and album's release, the group appeared on a live broadcast through V Live where they promoted and discussed the album. The group performed the song for the first time on Music Bank on February 3, 2017 and also appeared on Show! Music Core and Inkigayo. They performed on The Show, Show Champion and M Countdown the following week. The group also appeared on the Arirang show After School Club on February 7.

== Reception ==
Professional ratings
Review scores
Source	Rating
IZM	2.5/5 stars
The Star	8/10

Billboard called the title track "Rookie" a "quirky, funk-driven dance track with an unforgettable earworm of a hook". While The Star's Chester Chin thought that "Rookie" was the album's weakest track, he praised the rest of the album and noted that the group has finally found the perfect balance between their 'Red' and 'Velvet' sound, something he believed the group had been struggling with. He commented that it was the right mix of "saccharine and sophisticated" with its fun pop numbers and heartfelt ballads. According to The Korea Herald, Red Velvet's songs are known for being "weird at first, but addictive later" and "Rookie" is not an exception. Idolator chose it as the best k-pop song of the first quarter of the year. In 2017, Billboard put "Body Talk" at #10 on their '40 Best K-Pop Deep Cuts of the Decade So Far' list.

Rookie entered atop the Gaon Album Chart on the chart issue dated January 20 – February 4, 2017. The title track also charted at No. 4 on the Gaon Digital Chart and rose to No. 3 a week later. The other five tracks in the album also charted. The album topped Billboard's World Albums Chart and charted at No. 21 on its Heatseekers Album Chart. The group won their first music show trophy on The Show on February 7 and later won on Show Champion, M Countdown, Music Bank and Inkigayo for two consecutive weeks.

== Track listing ==
Rookie track listing
No.	Title	Lyrics	Music	Arrangement	Length
1.	"Rookie"	Jo Yoon-kyung	Jamil "Digi" Chammas; Leven Kali; Sara Forsberg; Karl "KP" Powell (The Colleagues); Harrison Johnson (The Colleagues); MZMC; Otha "Vakseen" Davis III; Jeremy "Tay" Jasper	The Colleagues; Jamil "Digi" Chammas	3:17
2.	"Little Little"	JQ (MUMW); Jo Mi-yang (Lalala Studio); Park Seong-hee	Gifty Dankwah; Bruce Fielder	Gifty Dankwah; Bruce Fielder	3:59
3.	"Happily Ever After"	Song Carat	Sebastian Lundberg (Trinity Music); Fredrik Häggstam (Trinity Music); Johan Gustafsson (Trinity Music); Courtney Jenaé Stahl; Deez	Trinity Music; Courtney Jenaé Stahl; Deez	3:21
4.	"Talk to Me"	Lee Seu-ran	Kervens Mazile; Annalise Morelli (Lyre); Alina Smith (Lyre); Mats Ymell	Kervens Mazile; Lyre; Mats Ymell	3:32
5.	"Body Talk"	Misfit; Jo Yoon-kyung	Sebastian Lundberg (Trinity Music); Fredrik Häggstam (Trinity Music); Johan Gustafsson (Trinity Music); Ylva Dimberg	Trinity Music; Ylva Dimberg	3:39
6.	"Last Love" (마지막 사랑; Majimak sarang) (Wendy solo)	Lee Hyun-kyu	Park Geun-tae	Don Spike	4:54
Total length:					22:46

== Charts ==
=== Weekly charts ===
Chart (2017)	Peak position
Japanese Albums (Oricon)	43
South Korean Albums (Gaon)	1
US World Albums (Billboard)	1
US Heatseekers Albums (Billboard)	21

=== Monthly charts ===
Chart (2017)	Peak position
South Korean Albums (Gaon)	4

== Release history ==
Region	Date	Format	Label	Ref.
South Korea	February 1, 2017	CD; digital download; SMC	SM Entertainment; KT Music	
Various	February 1, 2017	Digital download	SM Entertainment	
