= Wish Tree (song) =

Single by Red Velvet

from the album Winter Garden
- Language: Korean
- Released: December 18, 2015
- Recorded: 2015
- Genre: Christmas; Pop
- Length: 3:18
- Label: SM; KT
- Composers: Matthew Tishler; Felicia Barton; Aaron Benward
- Lyricist: January 8th
- Producers: Matthew Tishler; Felicia Barton; Aaron Benward

Red Velvet singles chronology
"Dumb Dumb" (2015)	"Wish Tree" (2015)	"One of These Nights" (2016)

Music video
- "Wish Tree" on YouTube

"Wish Tree" (Korean: 세가지 소원; RR: Segaji Sowon lit. Three Wishes) is a song recorded by South Korean girl group Red Velvet. It was released as the second single from their collaborative compilation album Winter Garden with f(x) and BoA on December 18, 2015. The song is "a pop ballad with a warm feel and an acoustic sound". It debuted and peaked at number thirty-three on the Gaon Digital Chart.

== Background and composition ==
On December 4, 2015 SM Entertainment announced a winter single project titled Winter Garden. Three teaser images with the number '15', '18' and '22' were released all of which were the release dates of the singles. On December 7, Red Velvet was confirmed to be part of the project and their song was released on December 18.

The song is composed in F major and has a tempo of 114 bpm and has a running time of 3 minutes and 58 seconds."Wish Tree" is "a pop ballad with a warm feel and an acoustic sound".

== Promotion and reception ==
To promote the song, Seulgi & Wendy took part in a one-hour show which was broadcast on Naver's V app an hour before the song's release. They were joined by f(x)'s Amber & Luna and they all discussed their groups' activities in the past year and promoted the singles The group as a whole performed the song live for the first time on Music Bank on December 25.

The song debuted at number 33 on the 52nd weekly issue of South Korea's Gaon Digital Chart for 2015 during the period dated December 13–19.

== Track listing ==
Digital download / streaming

1. "Wish Tree" – 3:18

== Credits and personnel ==
Credits adapted from Melon.

- Red Velvet (Irene, Seulgi, Wendy, Joy, Yeri) – vocals
- January 8 – Korean songwriting
- Matthew Tishler – composition
- Felicia Barton – composition
- Aaron Benward – composition
- Hwang Chan-hee – arrangement
- Cheerful Player – arrangement
- Park In-young – strings arrangement, conductor

== Charts ==
Weekly chart performance for "Wish Tree"
Chart (2015)	Peak position
South Korea (Gaon)	33

== Sales ==
Chart	Sales
South Korea	128,382

== Release history ==
Release dates and formats for "Wish Tree"
Region	Date	Format(s)	Label(s)	Ref.
Various	December 18, 2015	Digital download; streaming	SM Entertainment; KT Music	
