= Zoo (Red Velvet song) =

2017 song by Red Velvet

Song by Red Velvet

from the album The Red Summer
- Released: July 9, 2017
- Genre: Tropical; EDM
- Length: 3:24
- Label: SM; Genie
- Songwriters: Lee Seu-ran; LDN Noise; Courtney Jenaé Stahl; Alice Penrose
- Producers: Courtney Jenaé Stahl, Alice Penrose and LDN Noise

Audio video
- "Zoo" on YouTube

"Zoo" is a song recorded by South Korean girl group Red Velvet for their first special extended play (EP) The Red Summer (2017). It was written by Lee Seu-ran of Jam Factory, and composed by Courtney Jenaé Stahl, Alice Penrose and production team LDN Noise. The tropical house-influenced song has since become a stand-out track and received favorably reviews from music critics, citing it as a "gleeful and audacious pop moment". Following the digital success of the parental extended play, "Zoo" achieved a peak at number 24 on the Gaon Digital Chart.

== Background and composition ==
Following the release of Red Velvet's fourth extended play Rookie in February, SM Entertainment confirmed through news outlet on June 23, 2017, that the girls would be releasing their first summer release and had recently finished filming a music video. After revealing both the group's image and video teasers, the song was released digitally with its parent album on July 9, 2017, and physically on July 10, 2017.

"Zoo" is a tropical-influenced song which was composed in the key of C# major, with a tempo of 109 BPM. The song has been described as "playful and rhythmic", while incorporating animal sounds and member Seulgi's imitation of Tarzan's battle cry throughout the track. It also marked the first LDN Noise production work for an S.M. artist in 2017 and the second time they work with Red Velvet, after the release of the group's first studio album The Red (2015).

== Reception ==
The song received positive reviews from critics following its digital release, with Lee Gi-seon of IZM magazine chose the track as one of the EP's highlights. Chase McMullen of The 405 website praised the song, calling it "one of the most gleeful and audacious pop moments". Chester Chin from Star2 reacted positively to the song. citing it and follow album track "Mojito" as examples for "extend the feel-good dance floor vibe".

Due to the digital success of The Red Summer, all five tracks from the EP charted within the top forty of the Gaon Digital Chart for the week from July 9 to July 15, 2017, with "Zoo" debuting and peaking at number 24. It also debuted at number 30 on the re-established Billboard K-Pop Hot 100 for the week of July 17, and peaked at number 96 on the July issue of the monthly Gaon Download Chart.

== Live performance ==
The song was first performed at Red Velvet's first concert "Red Room" in August, 2017.

== Credits and personnel ==
Credits adapted from the liner notes of The Red Summer.

Studio

- Recorded at doobdoob Studio
- Edited at Big Shot Studio
- Mixed at SM Yellow Tail Studio

Personnel

- Red Velvet (Irene, Seulgi, Wendy, Joy, Yeri) – vocals, background vocals
- Lee Seu-ran – Korean lyrics
- LDN Noise – original writer, arrangement
- Courtney Jenaé Stahl – original writer, background vocals
- Alice Penrose – original writer
- Kenzie – vocal director
- Ahn Chang-kyu – recording
- Lee Min-kyu – digital editing
- Koo Jong-pil (Beat Burger) – mixing

== Charts ==
=== Weekly chart ===
Weekly chart performance for "Zoo"
Chart (2017)	Peak position
South Korea (Gaon)	24
South Korea (Billboard K-pop Hot 100)	30

=== Monthly chart ===
Monthly chart performance for "Zoo"
Chart (2017)	Peak position
South Korea (Gaon Download Chart)	96

== Release history ==
Region	Date	Format	Label
South Korea	July 9, 2017	Digital download	SM Entertainment, Genie Music
Worldwide	July 9, 2017	Digital download	SM Entertainment
