= Sappy (EP) =

- Digital and CD+DVD version cover

EP by Red Velvet
- Released: May 29, 2019
- Studio: SM Studios (Seoul, South Korea)
- Genre: J-pop; electropop; trop house; funk
- Length: 19:44
- Language: Japanese; English
- Label: Avex

Red Velvet chronology
RBB (2018)	Sappy (2019)	The ReVe Festival: Day 1 (2019)

Singles from Sappy
- 1. "Sappy" Released: January 6, 2019; 2. "Sayonara" Released: February 20, 2019; 3. "Power Up (Japanese version)" Released: April 24, 2019

Sappy is the second Japanese extended play and the ninth overall by South Korean girl group Red Velvet. It was released by Avex Trax on May 29, 2019. The EP features six tracks, including their previously released singles "Sappy", "Sayonara", and the Japanese version of "Power Up".

== Release ==
Sappy was released in two physical editions: a CD-only first-press limited edition and a CD+DVD regular edition. It was also released as a digital download.

== Commercial performance ==
The EP debuted at number four on the Oricon Albums Chart in its first week with 14,769 physical copies sold. It also debuted at number 4 on Billboard Japan's Hot Albums. The EP also charted at number 61 on Billboard Japan's Top Download Albums and at number 4 on Top Albums Sales with 16,140 estimated copies sold.

== Track listing ==
Sappy track listing
No.	Title	Lyrics	Music	Arrangement	Length
1.	"Sappy"	MEG.ME	Maria Marcus; Andreas Öberg; Emyli	Andreas Öberg; Emyli	3:19
2.	"Swimming Pool"	Hidenori Tanaka (Agehasprings)	Didrik Thott; Sean Alexander (Avenue 52); Daren "Baby Dee Beats" Smith	Avenue 52	3:20
3.	"Sayonara"	Daisuke Nojima (Agehasprings)	Hyuk Shin (Joombas); Kyum Lyk (Joombas); Ashley Alisha (Joombas); JJ Evans (Joombas)	Joombas	3:15
4.	"Peek-a-Boo" (Japanese version)	Kenzie; H. Toyosaki	Jonatan Gusmark (Moonshine); Ludvig Evers (Moonshine); Cazzi Opeia (Sunshine); Ellen Berg Tollbom (Sunshine)	Moonshine	3:09
5.	"Rookie" (Japanese version)	Jo Yoon-kyung; Amon Hayashi (Digz Inc.)	Jamil "Digi" Chammas; Leven Kali; Sara Forsberg; Karl "KP" Powell (The Colleagues); Harrison Johnson (The Colleagues); MZMC; Otha "Vakseen" Davis III; Jeremy "Tay" Jasper	The Colleagues; Jamil "Digi" Chammas	3:16
6.	"Power Up" (Japanese version)	Kenzie; H. Toyosaki	Jonatan Gusmark (Moonshine); Ludvig Evers (Moonshine); Cazzi Opeia (Sunshine); Ellen Berg Tollbom (Sunshine)	Moonshine	3:25
Total length:					19:49

CD+DVD
No.	Title	Length
1.	"Sappy" (Music video)
2.	"#Cookie Jar" (Music video)
3.	"Sappy" (Music video making clip)
4.	"Sappy" (Jacket making clip)
5.	"#Cookie Jar" (Music video making clip)
6.	"#Cookie Jar" (Jacket making clip)
7.	"Red Velvet 1st Concert "Red Room" in Japan" (Backstage making)
8.	"ReVeluv-Baby Premium Party" (Digest)

== Charts ==
Chart (2019)	Peak position
Japan Hot Albums (Billboard)	4
Japanese Albums (Oricon)	4
