= Russian Roulette (Red Velvet song) =

2016 single by Red Velvet

Single by Red Velvet

from the EP Russian Roulette
- Released: September 7, 2016
- Studio: S.M. Studio, Seoul
- Genre: Electropop
- Length: 3:31
- Label: SM; KT Music
- Songwriters: Jo Yoon-kyung; Albi Albertsson; Belle Humble; Markus Lindell
- Producers: Albi Albertsson; Belle Humble; Markus Lindell

Red Velvet singles chronology
| "One of These Nights" (2016) | "Russian Roulette" (2016) | "Rookie" (2017) |

Music video
- "Russian Roulette" on YouTube

"Russian Roulette" (Korean: 러시안 룰렛; RR: Reosian rullet) is a song by South Korean girl group Red Velvet for their third extended play of the same name. Written by Jo Yoon-kyung and produced by Albi Albertsson, Belle Humble and Markus Lindell, it is primarily an 8-bit influenced synth-pop and dance-pop song which lyrically compares the process of winning someone's heart to a game of Russian roulette. The song was released as the EP's lead single on September 7, 2016, by SM Entertainment along with an accompanying cartoon-themed music video which saw the group mimicking cartoon tricks to prank and harm each other.

"Russian Roulette" received generally favorable reviews from critics upon its release, both domestically and internationally for its brightness and being "devilishly satisfying". The music video also received attention for its semi-inspiration by The Simpsons's fictional animated television series, Itchy & Scratchy that masks violent and almost lethal pranks the members pulled on each other in a bright, bubbly and seemingly fun-filled video. Dazed Digital placed it at number six on their 20 Best K-pop Tracks of the Year and it won Best Music Video at the 2016 Melon Music Awards.

The song also attained commercial success, peaking at number two on both Billboard's World Digital Songs chart and South Korea's Gaon Digital Chart, which, at the time, were the group's highest rankings on both charts. It was among the group's best selling singles in their native country, being their second single to achieve more than 2,500,000 downloads as of May 2019.

== Background and release ==
After the release of the group's second extended play The Velvet in March 2016, various news sites in South Korea reported in May that Red Velvet will have a summer comeback. Despite this, the album was postponed multiple times, causing the group members great stress before their label S.M. Entertainment finally announced its release in later September. The group released the first teaser on September 1, and then released several individual teasers of the group presented as collages on their official Instagram account throughout the week. The extended play, along with the music video for "Russian Roulette" were released on September 7.

Following the song's release, the group revealed that they had heard the song when they were still trainees (which indicated the song was written long before their debut), unaware that they would one day record and release it. It was later revealed that "Russian Roulette", the 2017 single "Rookie" and the 2019 single "Zimzalabim" were potential lead single choices at the time for the girl group, but eventually it was chosen to be released first by the label.

== Composition ==
"Russian Roulette"
A 30-second sample of "Russian Roulette", a synthpop song by Red Velvet

"Russian Roulette" was composed and produced by Albi Albertsson, Belle Humble and Markus Lindell, with Korean lyrics adaptation by songwriter Jo Yoon-kyung. Bradley Stern of PopCrush characterized it as a perky, retro-sounding electro-pop tune. It is considered as the group's first single that is a mixture between their "Red" and "Velvet" style, composed in the key of E-flat major with a tempo of 130 beats per minute. The song's lyrics compares the challenge of winning someone's affection to a game of Russian roulette.

Originally recorded in Korean for the group's third extended play in September 2016, Red Velvet also recorded the song in Japanese for the group's debut Japanese release on July 4, 2018, with Japanese lyrics adaptation from songwriter Kami Kaoru.

== Promotion and music video ==
=== Promotion ===
An hour before the single's release, Red Velvet held a special countdown through the Naver app V Live, where they discussed the album and its tracks. The group began promoting the song on music shows on September 8, performing both "Russian Roulette" and the album track "Lucky Girl" live for the first time on M! Countdown. Throughout the week, they performed both songs on other music programs such as Music Bank, Inkigayo and The Show, where they won their first music show trophy for the song on September 13, eventually achieved a total of six music trophies.

=== Music video ===
A music video of the song directed by Shin Hee-won was premiered on the official YouTube channel of S.M. Entertainment on September 7, 2016, to coincide with the album's release. It was choreographed by Ryu Sohee and Los Angeles-based choreographer Kyle Hanagami who did the choreography of the group's second single "Be Natural" (2014) and their fourth single "Ice Cream Cake" (2015).

A screen capture of an Itchy & Scratchy scene featured in the music video and the scene where the members reenact it

With its bright, sports-themed and colorful setting, the music video gained attention for its violent content hidden beneath a fun and playful song. While dressed in cute outfits, the members sing about a romantic relationship that they compare to a game of Russian roulette as they try to inflict harm on each other. Each member appear in various scenes dropping tennis balls, pianos, refrigerators, and lockers on the other girls, or even feeding the rest colored nuts and bolts instead of cereal. The video featured clips of Itchy & Scratchy, which is a fictional cartoon show and running gag on the American animated sitcom The Simpsons. These scenes were shown right before the members reenact the characters' actions, such as when they push a member in front of an oncoming car or into an empty swimming pool. Sherly Tucci of The Daily Dot stated that the song's cheerful sound "juxtaposes the catastrophic and lethal pranks the girls play on each other" in the video where the members "show their dark side with stone-faced stares and subtle smirks". Bradley Stern of PopCrush likened the black comedy in the video to the film Jawbreaker and said it's "pretty genius". The Inquisitr said it utilized colorful visuals, entertaining video shots and plot settings, claiming that it is just as artistic as the music videos for their previous singles "Dumb Dumb" and "One of These Nights", although it "takes a slower pace than the former but quicker than the latter". "Russian Roulette" became the most viewed k-pop music video for the month of September in America and worldwide.

During their Naver V Live broadcast on September 6, the group revealed that some members broke large parts of the set which the staff had to rebuild as they were filming it, partly due to the nature of the scenes they shot. Member Joy also expressed her concerns about its rating due to the violent theme of some of the scenes.

The song won Best Music Video at the 2016 Melon Music Awards. On January 27, 2018, the music video for "Russian Roulette" hit 100 million views on YouTube, which makes Red Velvet the seventh K-pop girl group to reach 100 million views, as well as the third girl group from SM Entertainment to reach this milestone.

== Critical reception ==
Upon its release, "Russian Roulette" received generally positive reviews from music critics. Writing for The Daily Dot, Sherly Tucci called it a "cute and bubbly song complemented by the bright colors of the music video". She also said that the members' sugar-coated voices in conjunction with an upbeat melody "make it impossible not to bob your head to the music". In her interview with the group, Taylor Glasby of Dazed Digital said the music video "has a sinister combination of sweetness and threat" and remarked that "it's hard to think of anyone else that could pull off those kinds of concepts". The song was eventually included in their 20 Best K-Pop Tracks of the Year, ranking at number six and the site called it a "devilishly satisfying" track with a "memorable chorus and crazily joyous synth breakdown" that "sneaks in with robotic stuttering, doing a lot to break up the sweet but tonally deliberately narrow vocals". Tone Glow also put it at number nine on their 30 Best K-pop Songs of 2016 list, stating that its chipper "heart b-b-beats" and arcade noises grant the song a bright sheen.

However, Chester Chin of the Malaysian news site The Star felt that the single and the album was somewhat a disappointment after the "brilliant experimental vibes" of their last EP The Velvet, which was released in the same year. He commented that the song was "a fun and glossy dance-pop number" with "infectious hooks and bubbly rhythms" but claimed that the album's tracks "lacked the edge and quirks" of their other singles such as "Ice Cream Cake" and "Dumb Dumb".

== Commercial performance ==
The song achieved both domestic and international success. On the week of September 10, 2016, the song made its appearance at number three on the Gaon Digital Chart before rising to number two where it peaked the following week, tying with "Dumb Dumb" as the group's highest-charting single in South Korea at the time. It ended up as the 39th best-selling single on the 2016 Gaon Year-End Digital Chart. The song also appeared on the newly refunctioned Billboard K-Pop Hot 100 in 2017, peaking at number seventy on the chart's first week ranking. In 2018, Gaon reported that the song has had over 100 million streams. In May 2019, Gaon reported that the song has had over 2,500,000 downloads, thus became their second song to achieve such milestone following "Red Flavor".

"Russian Roulette" also achieved success in the United States as it reached a peak of number two on Billboard's World Digital Songs chart. As of December 2019, it is the group's third best selling single in the States, having achieved a cumulative sales of 24,000 downloads.

== Usage in media ==
As part of their "Red Velvet" night during the 2017 Baker's Dozen concert series, American band Phish played the song as walk-out music after the show at Madison Square Garden in New York City, NY.

Along with the 2019 single "Zimzalabim", the song made its appearance during the dance-off scene in the 2020 Trolls World Tour, in which the members were also part of the cast, portraying the "K-Pop gang".

== Credits and personnel ==
Credits adapted from Russian Roulette liner notes

- S.M. Entertainment Co., Ltd. – executive producer
- Lee Soo-man – producer
- Lee Joo-hyung – vocal director, recording engineer
- Jang Woo-young – digital editing
- Nam Koong-jin – mixing engineer
- Red Velvet – vocals
  - Irene – vocals, background vocals
  - Seulgi – vocals, background vocals
  - Wendy – vocals, background vocals
  - Joy – vocals, background vocals
  - Yeri – vocals, background vocals
- Yoo Shin-hye – background vocals
- Jo Yoon-kyung – lyricist
- Albi Albertsson – composer, arrangement
- Belle Humble – composer, arrangement, background vocals
- Markus Lindell – composer, arrangement
- Tom Coyne – mastering engineer

== Charts ==
=== Weekly charts ===
| Chart (2016–2017) | Peak position |
|---|---|
| South Korea (Gaon Digital Chart) | 2 |
| South Korea (Billboard K-Pop Hot 100) | 70 |
| US World Digital Songs (Billboard) | 2 |

=== Year-end charts ===
| Chart (2016) | Position |
|---|---|
| South Korea (Gaon Digital Chart) | 39 |

=== Monthly chart ===
| Chart (2016) | Peak position |
|---|---|
| South Korea (Gaon Digital Chart) | 3 |

== Certifications ==
| Region | Certification | Certified units/sales |
|---|---|---|
| New Zealand (RMNZ) | Gold | 15,000^{‡} |
^{‡} Sales+streaming figures based on certification alone.

== Accolades ==
=== Year-end awards ===
| Year | Organization | Award | Result |
|---|---|---|---|
| 2016 | Melon Music Awards | Best Music Video | Won |
| 2016 | Melon Music Awards | Dance Award (Female) | Nominated |
| 2016 | Mnet Asian Music Awards | Best Dance Performance Female Group | Nominated |
| 2016 | Mnet Asian Music Awards | Song of the Year | Nominated |
| 2017 | Gaon Chart Music Awards | Song of the Month (September) | Nominated |
| 2017 | Korean Music Awards | Best Pop Song | Nominated |
| 2017 | Golden Disc Awards | Digital Single Division Main Award | Nominated |

=== Music program awards ===
| Program | Date |
|---|---|
| The Show (SBS MTV) | September 13, 2016 |
| The Show (SBS MTV) | September 20, 2016 |
| M Countdown (Mnet) | September 15, 2016 |
| M Countdown (Mnet) | September 22, 2016 |
| Show Champion (MBC Music) | September 21, 2016 |
| Inkigayo (SBS) | September 25, 2016 |

== Sales ==
| Chart | Sales |
|---|---|
| South Korea | 2,500,000+ |
| United States | 24,000+ |

== Release history ==
| Region | Date | Format | Label |
|---|---|---|---|
| South Korea | September 7, 2016 | Digital download, streaming | S.M. Entertainment, KT Music |
| Worldwide | September 7, 2016 | Digital download, streaming | S.M. Entertainment |

== See also ==
- List of M Countdown Chart winners (2016)
- List of Inkigayo Chart winners (2016)
