= Surfin' Boy =

- iScreaM Vol.40: Surfin' Boy Remixes cover

Single by Red Velvet

from the EP Velvet Summer
- Language: Korean; English
- Released: August 3, 2026
- Studio: SM Aube; SM Droplet
- Genre: Dance
- Length: 2:48
- Label: SM; Kakao
- Composers: Soulkidd (The Hub); Honey Noise (The Hub); Kwon Ae-jin (MonoTree); Ikki
- Lyricist: Joy

Red Velvet singles chronology
"Sweet Dreams" (2024)	"Surfin' Boy" (2026)

Music video
- "Surfin' Boy" on YouTube

"Surfin' Boy" is a song recorded by South Korean girl group Red Velvet for their seventh special extended play Velvet Summer. It was released as the EP's lead single by SM Entertainment on August 3, 2026. The dance song was written by member Joy as its lyricist, with Soulkidd, Honey Noise, Kwon Ae-jin, and Ikki credited as composers. A remix single was released on August 28, 2026, by SM Entertainment and ScreaM Records, titled iScreaM Vol.40: Surfin' Boy Remixes.

== Background and release ==
On June 15, 2026, SM Entertainment announced that Red Velvet would be releasing a new album in August 2026. On July 6, it was announced that the group would be releasing an extended play titled Velvet Summer on August 3. On July 31, the music video teaser was released. The song was released alongside its music video and the extended play on August 3. On August 28, a remix single titled iScreaM Vol.40 : Surfin' Boy Remixes, featuring remixes by producers Flamingosis and R&B duo Rakunelama, was released.

== Composition ==
"Surfin' Boy" was written by member Joy, composed and arranged by The Hub's Soulkidd and Honey Noise, with Kwon Ae-jin from MonoTree and Ikki contributing to the composition. It is a dance song characterized by "bossanova guitar, reggae rhythms, and house groove" with lyrics that "reminisce about the hottest summer spent with a loved one and the creation of a brilliant memory".

== Critical reception ==
Professional ratings
Review scores
Source	Rating
IZM	3.5/5 stars

Park Si-hoon of IZM gave "Surfin' Boy" three and a half out of five stars, describing its chorus-centered structure as "unexpectedly stable". He praised its "restrained melodies" in the verses and strong vocals in the bridge, concluding that its upbeat rhythm gives the song a bittersweet feeling that extends beyond simple nostalgia.

== Accolades ==
On South Korean music programs, "Surfin' Boy" achieved one first-place win, on the August 12 broadcast of Show Champion.

== Commercial performance ==
Commercially, "Surfin' Boy" debuted at number 20 on South Korea's Circle Digital Chart in the chart issue dated August 2–8, 2026; on its component charts, the song debuted at number two on the Circle Download Chart, number 42 on the Circle Streaming Chart, and number 65 on the Circle BGM Chart. In the following week, the song ascended to number 17 on the Circle Digital Chart, and number 20 on the Circle Streaming Chart.

== Promotion ==
Prior to the release of Velvet Summer, Red Velvet performed "Surfin' Boy" at the A Day in Red & Velvet fan concert tour, held from July 31 to August 2, 2026. They subsequently performed the song at three music programs: Mnet's M Countdown on August 6, KBS2's Music Bank on August 7., and MBC's Show! Music Core on August 8.

== Track listing ==
Digital download / streaming

1. "Surfin' Boy" – 2:48

Digital download / streaming – iScreaM remixes

1. "Surfin' Boy" (Flamingosis remix) – 3:08
2. "Surfin' Boy" (Rakunelama remix) – 2:48
3. "Surfin' Boy" – 2:48

== Credits and personnel ==
Credits adapted from Velvet Summer's liner notes.

Studio

- SM Aube – recording, digital editing
- SM Droplet – recording
- SM Blue Ocean – mixing
- Sterling Sound – mastering

Personnel

- SM Entertainment – executive producer
- Red Velvet – vocals, background vocals
  - Joy – lyrics
- Soulkidd (The Hub) – producer, composition, arrangement, background vocals
- Honey Noise (The Hub) – producer, composition, arrangement
- Kwon Ae-jin (MonoTree) – composition, background vocals
- Ikki – composition, background vocals
- Jsong – vocal directing
- Kim Hyo-joon – recording, digital editing
- Kim Joo-hyun – recording
- Kim Cheol-sun – mixing
- Joe LaPorta – mastering

== Charts ==
=== Weekly charts ===
Weekly chart performance for "Surfin' Boy"
Chart (2026)	Peak position
South Korea (Circle)	17

=== Monthly charts ===
Monthly chart performance for "Surfin' Boy"
Chart (2026)	Peak position
South Korea (Circle)	21

== Release history ==
Release history for "Surfin' Boy"
Region	Date	Format	Label	Version
Various	August 3, 2026	Music download; streaming	SM; Kakao	Original
Various	August 28, 2026	Music download; streaming	SM; ScreaM	iScreaM remixes
