= Would U =

Single by Red Velvet
- Language: Korean
- Released: March 31, 2017
- Studio: SM Studios, Seoul, South Korea
- Genre: Pop
- Length: 3:24
- Label: SM
- Songwriters: Jo Yun-gyeong; Albi Albertsson; Belle Humble; Markus Lindell

Red Velvet singles chronology
"Rookie" (2017)	"Would U" (2017)	"Red Flavor" (2017)

Music video
- "Would U" on YouTube

"Would U" is a song by South Korean girl group Red Velvet. Written by Albi Albertsson, Belle Humble and Markus Lindell, the song was released as the first track of the second season of SM Entertainment's music project SM Station. The music video features Irene and actor Kim Min-jae. Joy did not participate in the recording because of conflicting schedules with the filming of her drama, The Liar and His Lover.

== Background and composition ==
On June 23, 2017, SM Entertainment released a video teaser for the music video marking the second season of SM Station. On June 29, 2017, SM Entertainment release the second music video teaser. The song was released on July 31, 2017.

The song has been described to be a medium tempo pop song that fits the spring season and expresses the shy heart of a girl who is waiting for her love to come true.

== Reception ==
Following its initial release, "Would U" was met with positive reviews from music critics. Park Hee-ah of Y-Magazine viewed the track as "a song based on a very lovely plot." Hamchwa of the same magazine described the track as "welcoming" adding it as a "perfect song in spring".

== Music video ==
Although sung by all members of Red Velvet except Joy, the music video for "Would U" only featured Irene as a model. She was accompanied by actor Kim Min Jae in the music video of the song. In the video, Irene hides in a flower garden and steals actor Kim Min-jae, who shows off her spring-day performance. As Kim Min-jae walked through the garden, Irene was shy as she hidden herself in a flower garden. Irene then opened a gift box in the middle of the garden with the phrase 'Come to the secret flower garden'. This is the scene that follows the first teaser video when Irene discovered the phrase 'go to the jungle'.

== Credits and personnel ==
Credits adapted from Melon.

- Red Velvet (Irene, Seulgi, Wendy, Yeri) – vocals, background vocals
- Kim Woong – piano, moog bass
- Simon Petrén – outro piano
- Lee Ki – moog bass, drum programming
- Hong Beom-gyu – drum programming
- Lee Ji-hong (SM Lvyin Studio) – recording engineer, digital editing
- Oreo – Pro Tools operation
- Nam Goong-jin (S.M. Concert Hall Studio) – mixing engineer
- Kwon Nam-woo (JFS Mastering) – mastering

== Charts ==
=== Weekly charts ===
Weekly chart performance for "Would U"
Chart (2017)	Peak position
South Korea (Gaon)	13

== Release history ==
Release dates and formats for "Would U"
Region	Date	Format	Label
South Korea	March 31, 2017	Digital download; streaming	SM Entertainment
Various	March 31, 2017	Digital download; streaming	SM Entertainment
