= Sappy (Red Velvet song) =

Single by Red Velvet

from the album Sappy
- Language: Japanese
- Released: January 6, 2019
- Studio: MonoTree Studio
- Genre: J-pop; electropop; dance-pop
- Length: 3:19
- Label: SM; Avex
- Composers: Maria Marcus; Andreas Öberg; Emyli
- Lyricist: MEG.ME

Red Velvet singles chronology
"RBB (Really Bad Boy)" (2018)	"Sappy" (2019)	"Sayonara" (2019)

Music video
- "Sappy" on YouTube

"Sappy" is a song recorded by South Korean girl group Red Velvet for their second Japanese extended play (EP) of the same name. The song was released as the group's first digital single from the EP on January 6, 2019, by SM Entertainment and Avex Trax. Composed by Maria Marcus, Andreas Öberg, and Emyli with lyrics written by MEG.ME, it is an electro-pop and dance-pop song. The song tells about a boy picking between two love interests. It charted at number 13 on the Billboard World Digital Songs chart.

== Background and composition ==
On January 5, 2019, it was announced that Red Velvet will be releasing a digital single on January 6 at midnight JST (UTC+09:00). On the same day, SM Entertainment released a video teaser for the song on its official YouTube channel.

"Sappy" was composed by Maria Marcus, Andreas Öberg, and Emyli, while the lyrics were written by MEG.ME. Musically, the song was described as a brassy electro-pop and dance-pop track. Tamar Herman of Billboard noted the switching up of the single's momentum while "vacillating between the boisterous chants of the chorus and the melodic verses that explode with Red Velvet's powerful vocals". Takuo Matsumoto of Real Sound described the rare way for the Red Velvet to make a Japanese single with a pattern A-melody, B-melody, and chorus, emphasizing the "freshness" with elaborated chord progressions and melody lines. It is composed in the key of F minor, with a tempo of 106 beats per minute. Lyrically, the song tells a "Sappy" boy to pick between two love interests.

== Promotion and reception ==
The music video for "Sappy" was released on January 5, 2019. It shows variety of sets where Red Velvet interacts and spends their time playing around with foam while washing cars. Tamar Herman of Billboard described the "colorful, industrial setting and the peppy, hand-oriented" moves of the choreography, noting that it is a "bit of a throwback" to "Dumb Dumb" (2015). The song debuted at number 13 on the US Billboard World Digital Song Sales chart.

== Credits and personnel ==
Credits adapted from the liner notes of Sappy.

Studio

- Recorded at MonoTree Studio
- Edited at Victor Studio
- Mastered for One Up Mastering

Personnel

- Red Velvet (Irene, Seulgi, Wendy, Joy, Yeri) – vocals, background vocals
- MEG.ME – lyrics
- Maria Marcus – composition, track production
- Andreas Öberg – composition
- Emyli – composition
- G-high – vocal directing, Pro Tools operation, recording
- Shigeru Tanida – editing
- Jon Rezin – mixing
- John Horesco – mastering

== Charts ==
Weekly chart performance for "Sappy"
Chart (2019)	Peak position
US World Digital Song Sales (Billboard)	13

== Release history ==
Release dates and formats for "Sappy"
Region	Date	Format(s)	Label(s)	Ref.
Various	January 6, 2019	Digital download; streaming	SM Entertainment; Avex Trax	
