= Rookie (Red Velvet song) =

2017 single by Red Velvet

Single by Red Velvet

from the album Rookie
- Released: February 1, 2017
- Genre: Pop-funk; bubblegum pop
- Length: 3:17
- Label: SM; KT
- Composers: Jamil 'Digi' Chammas; Leven Kali; Sara Forsberg; Karl Powell; Harrison Johnson; Russell Steedle; MZMC; Otha 'Vakseen' Davis III; Tay Jasper
- Lyricist: Jo Yoon-kyung
- Producer: Lee Soo-man

Red Velvet singles chronology
"Russian Roulette" (2016)	"Rookie" (2017)	"Would U" (2017)

Music video
- "Rookie" on YouTube

"Rookie" is a song recorded by South Korean girl group Red Velvet for their fourth extended play of the same name. The song was released on February 1, 2017, as the lead single from the EP by SM Entertainment, and contains contributions from multiple songwriters, including Jo Yoon-kyung and Sara Forsberg. A pop-funk dance track, its lyrical content compares a girl's lover to a rookie.

While initial reactions to the song were unfavorable, it was better received as time went by. The Korea Herald stated that like Red Velvet's past eccentric pop releases, the song is "weird at first, but addictive later". Commercially, the song peaked at number three on the Gaon Digital Chart and number four on Billboard's World Digital Songs chart, and garnered over 1.3 million digital downloads in South Korea by the end of the year.

To promote the single, Red Velvet performed the song live on various domestic music programs. Internationally, the group headlined the K-Pop Night Out concert during the 2017 SXSW Conference and Festivals in Austin, Texas, and made an appearance at KCON Mexico the following day. The group additionally held a two-day fan meet in Malaysia in May, where they promoted the song's parent album through a mini showcase.

== Background and composition ==
"Rookie"
"Rookie" is a pop-funk song by Red Velvet

"Rookie" was produced by American production team The Colleagues, who previously worked with western rap artists such as 2 Chainz and Gucci Mane, and Jamil 'Digi' Chammas who composed the song along with Leven Kali, Sara Forsberg, Karl Powell, Harrison Johnson, Russell Steedle, MZMC, Otha 'Vakseen' Davis III, Tay Jasper while its Korean lyrics were penned by Jo Yoon-kyung. The single was released on February 1, 2017, in conjunction with its parent EP's release and music video.

Musically, the song is characterized as a pop-funk dance track, making it Red Velvet's fourth single to follow their "Red" sonic concept. Tamar Herman of Billboard stated that the song "draws on Red Velvet's unconventional musicality to combine low-key sing-speaking and synth beats before blasting into the saccharine hook of a chorus" while its melody is "dominated by brassy horns and plinking synths". On the other hand, Jacques Peterson of Idolator described it as "a pure bubblegum ditty based on old-school funk and R&B". Its lyrics compare a girl's lover to a 'rookie', with the word being repeated all throughout the chorus and hook.

== Music video and promotion ==
A music video directed by Shin Hee-won was released on the same day as the single's release, featuring choreography by Ryu So-hee and Japanese dancer and choreographer Rino Nakasone who has choreographed for other S.M. Entertainment artists such as TVXQ, Girls' Generation and Shinee. The members claimed that it was their most difficult choreography at the time. The music video begins with all five Red Velvet members at a play as 'rookie' performers. After being offered some mysterious pink smoke by member Joy, a series of random and entertaining scenarios ensue where the members follow a floral-clad mascot in a 'Wonderland' while wearing various colorful outfits, such as blue and white Alice-like dresses and continue the chase as they fly around in spaceships. It ends with the members exiting the stage they first appeared in. Billboard likened the girls in the video to Alice in Wonderland's titular character, as they travel in a world that's part Candyland and part Yellow Submarine. Meanwhile, Bradley Stern of PopCrush called it "a colorful visual buffet including a flower dude, UFO adventures and fourth wall-breaking meta marionette moments" and added that it's the K-pop version of The Lion, the Witch and the Wardrobe.

The group performed the single on all of South Korea's music programs (Music Bank, Inkigayo, The Show, Show Champion, M! Countdown, Show! Music Core) in February 2017, performing the song live for the first time on Music Bank on February 3, 2017. To help promote the song overseas, Red Velvet headlined the K-Pop Night Out concert during the 2017 SXSW Conference and Festivals at The Belmont on March 17, 2017, in Austin, Texas which had over 2,500 spectators. A day later, they participated in KCON Mexico. On April 16, the group had a fan event for the album in Taipei. They flew to Malaysia the next month to hold a two-day fanmeet at the LG Concourse of Berjaya Times Square in Kuala Lumpur, where they performed and promoted the song through a mini showcase for the EP.

== Critical reception ==
"Rookie" was initially criticized for being unconventional and confusing but eventually gained popularity in the group's native country where the song topped various South Korean music charts and its hook was lauded as the biggest earworm of the year.

Jeff Benjamin of Billboard labelled it as "a quirky, funk-driven dance track with an unforgettable earworm of a hook" while Jacques Peterson of Idolator called it "a testament to the barrier-breaking, musical diversity of the K-pop genre". The song also received generally favorable reviews in South Korea, where it was praised for its success despite earlier reactions from the public. The Korea Herald stated that similar to the group's previous eccentric pop releases, "Rookie" is "Weird at first, but addictive later". However, The Star's Chester Chin commented that while the EP's lead single had an "insanely catchy arrangement and energetic delivery", he felt that it is its weakest track.

Idolator chose "Rookie" as the best k-pop song of the first quarter of the year. It was also nominated for Song of the Year at the 2017 Melon Music Awards.

== Commercial performance ==
The song debuted at number 4 on the Gaon Digital Chart and rose to number 3 a week later. It also peaked at number 4 on Billboard's World Digital Songs chart. "Rookie" accumulated over 9 wins on South Korea's music programs, winning two consecutive weeks on Music Bank, Inkigayo, Show Champion and M! Countdown.

"Rookie" has sold over 1.3 million digital downloads in South Korea and was certified Platinum. It is The Colleagues' first single to receive Gold and Platinum certifications.

== Charts ==
=== Weekly charts ===
Chart (2017)	Peak position
South Korea (Gaon Digital Chart)	3
US World Digital Songs (Billboard)	4

=== Monthly charts ===
Chart (2017)	Position
South Korean Gaon Digital Chart	3

== Accolades ==
Awards and nominations
Year	Award show	Category	Result
2017	Melon Music Awards	Best Song Award	Nominated
2018	Gaon Chart Music Awards	Song of the Year – February	Nominated

Music program awards
Program	Date	Ref.
Music Bank (KBS)	February 10, 2017	
Music Bank (KBS)	February 17, 2017	
Inkigayo (SBS)	February 12, 2017	
Inkigayo (SBS)	February 19, 2017	
The Show (SBS MTV)	February 7, 2017	
Show Champion (MBC Music)	February 8, 2017	
Show Champion (MBC Music)	February 15, 2017	
M Countdown (Mnet)	February 9, 2017	
M Countdown (Mnet)	February 16, 2017	

== Release history ==
Region	Date	Format	Label
South Korea	February 1, 2017	Digital download, streaming	S.M. Entertainment, KT Music
Worldwide	February 1, 2017	Digital download, streaming	S.M. Entertainment

== See also ==
- List of Inkigayo Chart winners (2017)
- List of M Countdown Chart winners (2017)
