= Jam Factory (music publisher) =

South Korean music publisher

- Industry: Entertainment
- Headquarters: South Korea
- Services: Music Production
- Website: Official website

Jam Factory (Korean: 잼 팩토리) is a South Korean music publisher which sources song tunes and lyrics for K-pop, J-pop and Mandopop artists from songwriters predominantly based in the US. Writers of the tunes are often songwriters for American companies, such as Brandon Fraley, a well known provider of tunes to South Korean girl and boy bands, who is a songwriter for Sony Music Publishing in Los Angeles. Korean, Japanese and Chinese language lyrics are usually provided by Jam Factory's own lyricists based in Seoul.

As with the songwriters of America's Motown era Jam Factory's songwriters and lyricists may support a band's development over many years. For example, Girls' Generation songwriter team has included Korean lyricist Kim Hee-jeong for over 8 years, his lyrics growing with the band.

== Personnel ==
American songwriters

- David Amber
- Joleen Belle
- Ron Boustead
- Kang Park
- Corey Cross
- Alyssa Degati
- Deanna Dellacioppa
- Brandon Fraley
- Jamelle Fraley
- Gary Haase
- John Paul Lam
- Michael Lee
- Greg Lynch
- Ashley Jana
- Stefan Moeselle
- Sal Oliveri
- Reco
- Jay Saint
- Javier Solis
- Greg Stober
- Machan Tylor
- Joshua Welton
- Matt Zarley

British songwriters

- Ricky Hanley

Canadian songwriters

- Jessica Ridley
- Dan Somerville

German songwriters

- Simon Allert
- Andreas Bartels
- Florian Luettich
- Achim Radloff
- Rüdiger Schramm

Korean songwriters

- 4 Miles
- Bang Yoon-jin
- Choi Young-shin
- Jose
- Joy Factory
- Jung Hye-young
- Jung Jin-hwan
- Jung Young-ah
- Just
- Kim Hee-won
- Kim Hyun-joo
- Kim Lee-jin
- Kim Min-ji
- Kim Tae-yoon
- Ku Bon-young
- Kwak Jae-young
- Lee Eun-suk
- Lee Ho-min
- Lim Seung-hu
- Louie
- Min Yun-jae
- Park Jae-sik
- Park Joo-seung
- Park Kang-hyuk
- Park Ki-hyun
- Park Sang-il
- Redhead Anne
- Seo Ji-eum
- Seo Sung-hee
- Shin Hyung
- Shin Yo-han

== L Diary ==
In January 2013, Jam Factory established L Diary Lyrics & Toplining Academy, where aspiring Korean songwriters could learn to write song lyrics and vocal melodies. Since then, L Diary has produced around 100 professional songwriters through over 40 songwriting camps where students are given the opportunity to write lyrics and toplines for prominent K-Pop artists.

L Diary instructors

- Seong Kyu-ho (Onetop)
- Shin Yo-han
- Hong Joon-seok (Jay)
- Park Seung-hee
- Kim Bo-eun
- Lee Do-yeon
- Cho Eun-hee
- Yoon Kyung (Joy Factory)
- Seo Seung-hee (Soulsweet)
- Kim Jin-ah
- Kim Min-ji
- Jung Young-ah
- Kim In-hyung
- Seo-ro
- Ku Tae-woo
- Shin Jin-hye
- Lee Seu-ran
- Seo Ji-eum
- Jung Jin-hwan

L Diary songwriters

- Bae Jin-young
- Bae Mi-hyun
- Bae Min-young
- Baek In-kyung (100% lyricism)
- Baek Min-kyung
- Bang Hye-hyun
- Bang Hye-hyung
- Bang Sung-hee
- Bong Eun-young
- Cho Soo-min
- Cho Yu-ri
- Choi Ah-reum
- Choi Hee-jae
- Choi Hye-ji
- Choi Ji-yeon
- Choi Jin-sun
- Choi So-young
- Choi Young-mi
- Gil Da-som
- Han Shin-hye
- Hwang Ji-won
- Hwang Seon-jeong (January 8 (lalala Studio))
- Hwang Yoo-ra
- Jang Han-bit
- Jang In-hyung
- Jang Jung-won
- Jang Yoon-ji
- Jeon Ji-eun (January 8 (lalala Studio))
- Ji Yu-ri
- Jivantika
- Jung Geu-roo (Jung Tree)
- Jung Hye-young
- Jung Hyung-ah
- Jung Il-lee
- Jung Jan-di (Kim Min-jung)
- Jung Jin-hwan
- Jung Joo-hee
- Jung Keu-roo
- Jung Min-ji
- Jung Mul-hwa
- Jung Yoon-hyuk
- Jung Yoon-seo
- Jung Young-ah (100% Lyricism)
- Kang Boo-young
- Kang Ji-eun
- Kang Ji-young
- Kim Bo-eun
- Kim Chae-lin
- Kim Eun-joo
- Kim Hee-jung
- Kim Hee-yeon
- Kim In-ha
- Kim In-hyung
- Kim Jae-won
- Kim Jeong-mi (January 8 (lalala Studio))
- Kim Ji-won
- Kim Jin-ah
- Kim Jung-eun (Jung Il-li)
- Kim Mi-ryang
- Kim Mi-young
- Kim Min-ji
- Kim Moon-sook
- Kim Ran
- Kim Soo-jin
- Kim Soo-yeon
- Kim Soo-young
- Kim Sung-woo
- Kim Woo-jung
- Kim Woo-sung
- Kim Yang-ha
- Ko Hyun-jung
- Ko Tae-woo
- Ku Tae-woo
- Kwon Da-jung
- Kwon Ho-geun
- Kyung Jin-hee
- Lee Chae-yoon
- Lee Chang-hyuk
- Lee Chang-hyun
- Lee Da-yoon
- Lee Eun-ok
- Lee Hye-ri
- Lee Hyo-min
- Lee Jae-sung
- Lee Jung-hyun
- Lee Makeunseul
- Lee Na-yeon
- Lee Se-wol
- Lee Seu-ran
- Lee Seul (Clear Dew)
- Lee Seul-gi
- Lee Seul-jae
- Lee Tae-geon
- Lee Yoo-jin
- Lee Yoon-seol
- Lim Ga-in
- Lim Jung-hyo
- Lim Soo-kyung
- Lim Yoo-jung
- Moon Hae-eun
- Moon Hye-min
- Moon Seol-ri
- Moon Yeo-reum
- Noh Yoon-seo
- Oh Min-joo
- Oh Seung-eun
- Oh Yoo-won
- Park Da-in
- Park Hye-hyun
- Park Hyong-joon
- Park Seong-hee
- Park So-hyun
- Park Yi-soo
- Park Yong-joon
- Ration
- Readhead Anne
- Ryu Da-som
- Seo Ji-eum
- Seo Min-ji (Seo-ro)
- Seo Seung-hee (Soulsweet & 100% lyricism)
- Seo-ro
- Seol Sung-min
- Seong Dan-young
- Shim Ha-yeon
- Shim Ha-young
- Shim Yoo-bin
- Shim Yoo-jin
- Shin Hye-sun
- Shin Jin-hye
- Song Carat (Baek Geum-min)
- Song Carat (Lee Soo-jung)
- Song Min-so
- U.F.O.
- Yoo Da-eun
- Yoo Eun-mi
- Yoon Sung-ji
- Yoon Kyung (Joy Factory)

== Notable works ==
- "You can stay here", "What is Love (With Young Yoon)", " Meet Anyone Lately ", "Flower Of The Universe", "Say Yes" - Ailes
- "요즘 누구 만나 " - Aisle
- " Does it make sense ", " Black and White " - ALi
- "Heat", "Bing Bing", "I feel (Feeling)" - AOA
- "Treasure", 니가 불어와 (Crazy Sexy Cool) " - Astro
- "THE IDOLM @ STER" - B-Side
- "운명" - Baek Z Young
- "Think Hole" - B.A.P
- "Always, All Ways" (Feat. Chancellor)" - BoA
- "Easy" - Bastarz
- "Obsession", " 핑 (Never End) " - Boyfriend
- "I feel different the same night" - Vromance
- "Stars", "Please love me", "I'll cry", "사랑은 이제 그만", "Cherry fly.", "I do love doing it and laughed.", "What is love" - Bubble Sisters
- "Remember Today" - Bubble Sisters, Soulman
- "Mi Amor" - CocoSori
- "Love is You", "Fall in love", "When this song ends" - Dae-Kwang Hong
- "Rainbow (With Kids)" - DJ IT
- "Deja Vu", "Mayday", "Wake Up", "Good Night", "Chase Me" - Dreamcatcher
- "Your name" - El Tuwai (L2Y)
- "Black Pearl", "Don't Go", "Overdose", "Moonlight", "Run", "Love, Love, Love", "Call Me Baby", "What If...", "El Dorado", "Hurt", "Beautiful", "Love Me Right", "On the Snow", "Lightsaber" (Bonus Track), "White Noise", "One and Only", "Stronger", "Lotto", "Falling for You", "Twenty Four", "Winter Heat", "Chill", "Walk On Memories", "Love Me Right (Romantic Universe)", "With You", "Bad Dream", "Damage", "Wait", "Butterfly Effect", "Runaway" - Exo
- "Juliet", "Lazy"- Exo-CBX
- "4 Walls" - f(x)
- "Lazy Girl (Dolce Far Niente)", "Lion Heart", "Paradise", "Girls Are Back", "Only One" ,"You Better Run", "Closer" - Girls' Generation
- "Lil' Touch", "Fermata" - Girls' Generation-Oh!GG
- "Twinkle", "Baby Steps" - Girls' Generation-TTS
- "I focused on the mouth and then", "Two Faces", "bracket (Bracket)", "go out" - Gray Day
- "Not That Type", "Shotgun", "Lovesick" - Gugudan
- "Snack Song" - Haesol
- "Badster" - Hyo
- " 자화상 " - HyunA
- " Propose " - In Been
- "Alive" - J-Min
- "You are brilliant" - Jinho
- "Shine" - Jin-Woon Jeong
- "Because of You" - Joo-hyun park
- "walking on the moon" - Jun. K
- "I Wanna Be" (Feat. Soyeon of (G)I-dle) - Key
- "The Wanted" - Klang
- "살랑살랑" - Limd
- "All night (Feat. Kim Do-yeon of Weki Meki)"
- "8dayz" - Megan Lee
- " 야간비행", "Lovely Day" - Miles
- "Fighter", " X " - Monsta X
- "짜장면" - Myteen
- "I'm So Pretty", "SHUT UP!", "Thumb (You'll Be Mine)", "constellation (La Historia)", "Allegro Cantabile (By Your Side)" - Nature
- "Shooting Star (I'm You)"- Newkidd
- "Fire Truck", "Another World", "Heartbreaker", "Back 2 U (AM 01:27)", "Cherry Bomb", "0 Mile", "Sun&Moon", "Summer 127", "Replay (PM 01:27)", "Knock On", "Come Back", "Touch", "Superhuman", "Paper Plane", "Love Song", "White Night", "Dreams Come True", "Make Your Day", "Focus", "The Rainy Night", "Dreamer", "Love on the Floor", "Earthquake" - NCT 127
- "The 7th Sense", "Yestoday", "Yestoday (Extended Version)(Bonus Track)", "Dancing In The Rain", "Déjà Vu", "Faded In My Last Song", "All About You", "Round&Round" - NCT U
- "Trigger the fever (Bonus Track)", "Beautiful Time", "Drippin'", "Dear DREAM", "Boom", "119", "Bye My First...", "Dream Run", "Ridin'", "Quiet Down", "Love Again", "Hot Sauce", "My Youth", "Countdown (3, 2, 1)", "Life Is Still Going On", "Dreaming" - NCT Dream
- "Crime Scene", "Checkmate" - Oh My Girl
- "Shooting Star" - P-38
- " 누가 날 불러 ", "Who" - Pair Soul
- "I want to ..." - Pre-Melo
- " Hands on me " - Produce 101 (season 2)
- "To My World" - Produce X 101
- " I Must Go! " - Real Girls Project
- "Attention" - Red Queen
- "Would U", "Automatic", "Dumb Dumb", "Oh Boy", "Don't U Wait No More", "One of These Nights", "Sunny Afternoon", "Fool", "Little Little", "Happily Ever After", "Talk To Me", "You Better Know", "Zoo", "Kingdom Come", "About Love", "All Right", "With You", "Mosquito", "Blue Lemonade" "So Good", "Taste", "Milkshake", "Bing Bing", "Parade", "LP", "Zimzalabim", "Love Is the Way", "Remember Forever", "Pose", "Knock on Wood", "Better Be", "Feel My Rhythm", "Rainbow Halo", "Birthday", "Underwater", "Will I Ever See You Again?", "One Kiss", "Wings", "Sunflower", "Night Drive", "Sweet Dreams" - Red Velvet
- "I can think of anything (Sung by Aisle x Ahn Seung-hoon)", "31-28 (Sung by Aisle x CUDDY)" - Replay no.36 owl
- "Advisory is" - Roy Kim
- "Without You" - Ryeowook
- "Thinking Alcohol", "Night Coffee", "The farewells we encountered", "Hello, see you tomorrow", "Pink Dolphin", " 좋아 (Better Than Some) (Feat. Puddy) " - Seunghun Ahn
- "Take It On", "Nothing Better", "Searchlight", "Heal Me" - Seven O'Clock (band)
- "Hush" - SES
- "Zero gravity", "SHADOW", "Never Registered Say Goodbye", "Be My Baby", "Midnight Road", "4 Step", "Jungle Game" - SF9
- "I Want You", "Drive" - Shinee
- " 아야 " - S.I.S
- "Drama", "Happy", "Slow longer", "You & the I", "Sad lies", "Possessed", "Sketch" - Soul Sweet
- "My style" - Soul Sweet, Hannah (Rememberers)
- "Some" - Soyou, Junggigo
- " 보고싶어 " - Sung-Ri Kim
- "Game", "Me & U", " Black Suit ", " Good Day for a Good Day ", " 예뻐 보여 (Girlfriend) ", " I do (두 번째 고백) " - Super Junior
- "RUM DEE DEE", "summer night (I love it)", "Livin` In" - Super Junior-D&E
- "Jopping", "the Super the Car", "No Manners" - SuperM
- "Shadow", " Love ", " Labyrinth (Stone Heart) ", " Rise (Icarus) " - Taemin
- "Gemini", "Starlight", "Fashion", "Up & Down", "Good Thing", "Something New", "Curtain Call", "Feel So Fine", "Love in Colo)", "Eraser", "Find Me", "Dear Me", "Playlist", "Can't Control Myself" - Taeyeon
- "Road" - TRAX
- "Island", "WOLF BABY", " Don`t Stop The Dancing ", " 0 (Young) " - TRCNG
- " YESMAN ", "Without You" - TST
- "Truth", "Love Line", "Puzzle" (Sung By U-Know)", "Closer" (Sung By Max), "Bounce" - TVXQ
- "Dance The Night Away", "Shadow", "Brave", "New New", "Seesaw" - Twice
- "Hit Me Up (Feat.Giriboy )", " Blue Jeans - U-Know
- "Steal Your Heart" - UNIT BLACK
- " 경리단길 ", " 이별부자 (Feat. 조준호) " - Ukulele Picnic
- "Blue Rose", "CANDYLAND" - Up10tion
- "PARALLEL", "Shangri La(桃源 境)" - VIXX
- "Turn Back Time (Korean Version)", "Kick Back (Korean Version)" - WayV
- "퐁당퐁당 (Plop Plop)" - WJSN
- "Gift" - Woo-Hyuk Min
- "One For Ya" (Feat. Hash Swan) - XION
- "Fly (Bunji Jump)" - Yesung
- "Sad lies", "Please love me" - Yi-Joon Park
- " 너와 같은 하루 ", " 우산 쓴 사람 " - Young-Bae Cho
- " 추억시계 " - Young Ji-Heo, Kara
- "Fortune Cookie" - Young-Eun Seo
- "dB (Decibels)" - Young Yoon
- "Into You", "Dream" - Yuri
- "My World" - Zea
- "ZONK", "Dust (DUST)" - ZYEUN
