= Jo Yoon-kyung =

South Korean lyricist

- Born: 1984 or 1985 (age 40–41)
- Education: Hanyang University (2003)
- Occupations: Lyricist; writer
- Years active: 2002–present
- Employer: SM Entertainment

Korean name
- Hangul: 조윤경
- RR: Jo Yungyeong
- MR: Cho Yun'gyŏng

Jo Yoon-kyung (Korean: 조윤경) is a South Korean lyricist and writer. She has written primarily for SM Entertainment artists such as BoA, Girls' Generation, Shinee, Exo, NCT, Red Velvet, and Aespa. In 2017, she won Lyricist of the Year at the Gaon Chart Music Awards. Jo is known for her "fairy tale" lyrics.

== Life and career ==
Jo was a fan of Shinhwa in middle school, and applied to become a lyricist at SM Entertainment after finding an audition application guide in one of their albums. In her first year of high school, she signed an exclusive contract to be a lyricist for SM. She debuted as a lyricist in 2002 with BoA's "Listen to My Heart". As a college student, she thought she would not become a lyricist because of the low income. Jo graduated from Hanyang University in 2003, having studied Korean Language and Literature. In 2017 at the 6th Gaon Chart Music Awards, Jo won Lyricist of the Year. In April 2021, she published Into Your World (너의 세상으로; Neoui sesangeuro), a romantic fantasy which connects 12 songs she has written into a narrative. As of April 2024, she is a freelance lyricist not affiliated with any company.

== Discography ==
Jo made her debut as a lyricist in 2002 with "Listen to My Heart" by BoA. Since then, she worked primarily with SM Entertainment artists such as BoA, Girls' Generation, F(x), Shinee, Exo, NCT, Red Velvet, and Aespa. She has also worked with non-SM artists like The Boyz and Kiss of Life. Her "representative songs" include Shinee's "Sherlock", Taeyeon's "U R", and Red Velvet's "Rookie". As of September 7, 2025, Jo has 409 credits listed with the Korea Music Copyright Association.

== Filmography ==
=== Television series ===
Year	Title	Role	Ref.
2013	Pure Love	Writer	

=== Web series ===
Year	Title	Role	Notes	Ref.
2020	Café Kilimanjaro	Writer	Starring Kwon Hyun-bin	

== Bibliography ==
- Into Your World (너의 세상으로; Neoui sesangeuro, 2021)

== Awards ==
Name of the award ceremony, year presented, award category, nominee(s) of the award and the result of the nomination
Award ceremony	Year	Award category	Work(s)/nominee(s)	Result	Ref.
Gaon Chart Music Awards	2017	Lyricist of the Year	Jo Yoon-kyung	Won	
