= Red Velvet videography =

Red Velvet video discography
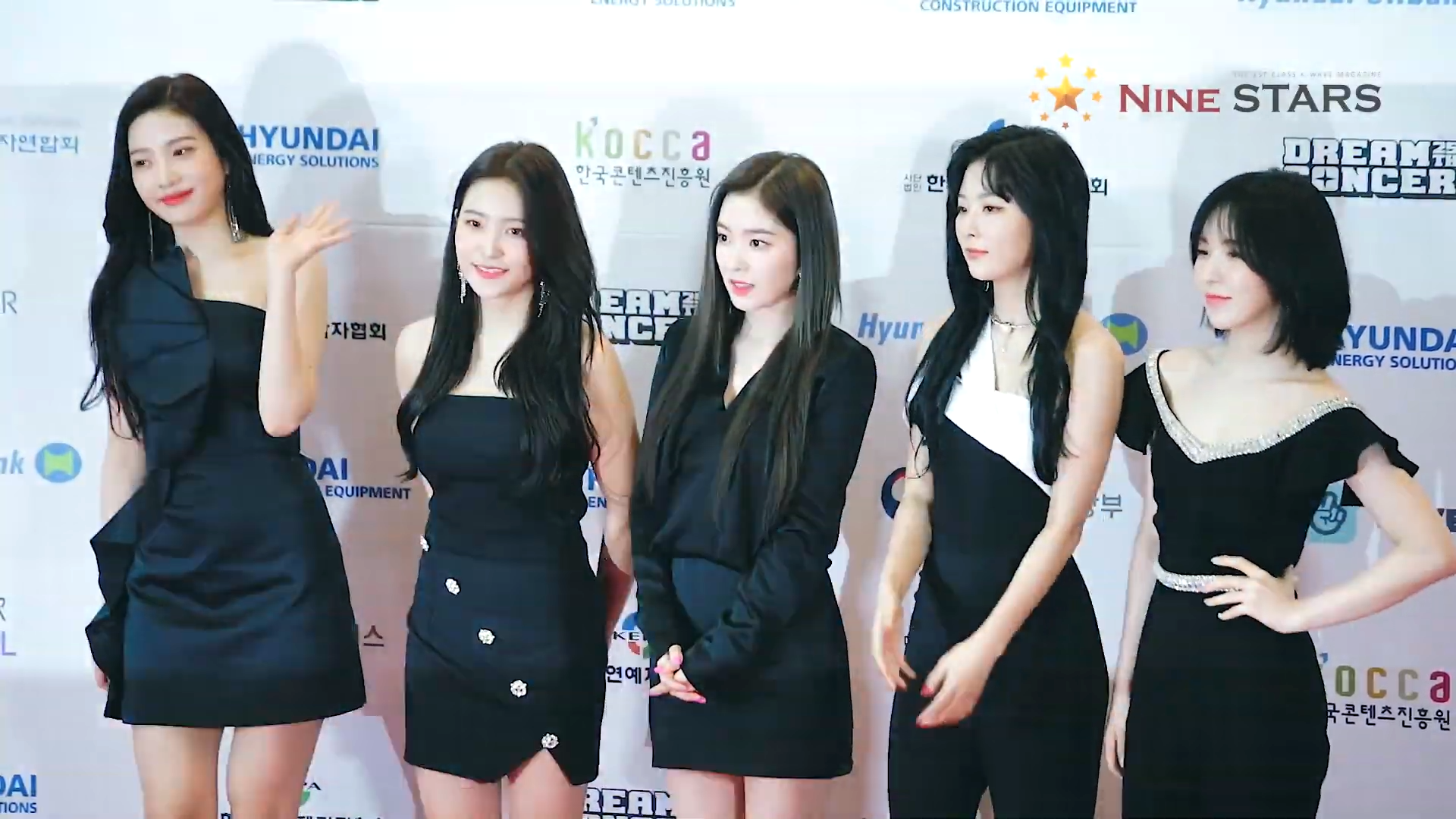
- Red Velvet in 2019
- Music videos: 35
- Video albums: 2
- Films: 1
- Television: 1

The videography of the South Korean group Red Velvet consists of thirty-five music videos and two video albums. Formed by entertainment company SM Entertainment and debuted in August 2014, the group initially consisted of four members; Irene, Seulgi, Wendy and Joy. In March 2015, Yeri joined the group.

== Music videos ==
=== Korean music videos ===
List of Korean music videos, showing year released, and name of director
| Title | Year | Director(s) | Ref. |
|---|---|---|---|
| "Happiness" | 2014 | Woogie Kim | |
| "Be Natural" | 2014 | Kwon Soon-wook | |
| "Automatic" | 2015 | Shin Hee-won | |
| "Ice Cream Cake" | 2015 | Woogie Kim | |
| "Dumb Dumb" | 2015 | Beomjin (VM Project) | |
| "One of These Nights" | 2016 | Shin Hee-won | |
| "Russian Roulette" | 2016 | Shin Hee-won | |
| "Rookie" | 2017 | Shin Hee-won | |
| "Would U" | 2017 | Koh In-gon | |
| "Red Flavor" | 2017 | Seong Chang-won | |
| "Rebirth" | 2017 | Shindong | |
| "Peek-a-Boo" | 2017 | Kim Zi-yong | |
| "Bad Boy" | 2018 | Kim Ja-kyeong | |
| "I Just" | 2018 | Themselves | |
| "Power Up" | 2018 | Kim Ja-kyeong | |
| "RBB (Really Bad Boy)" | 2018 | Oui Kim | |
| "Zimzalabim" | 2019 | Beomjin (VM Project) | |
| "Milkshake" | 2019 | Luxmedia | |
| "Umpah Umpah" | 2019 | O (Shin Hee-won) | |
| "Psycho" | 2019 | O (Shin Hee-won) | |
| "Queendom" | 2021 | 725 (Sl8ight) | |
| "Queendom" (Demicat Remix) | 2021 | 725 (Sl8ight) | |
| "Bad Boy" (Prep Remix) | 2021 | Unknown | |
| "Feel My Rhythm" | 2022 | O (Shin Hee-won) | |
| "Birthday" | 2022 | Kim Hyunsoo (Segaji) | |
| "Beautiful Christmas" (with Aespa) | 2022 | Unknown | |
| "Red Flavor" (Mar Vista Remix) | 2023 | Unknown | |
| "Chill Kill" | 2023 | Lee Youngeum (Ogg Visual) | |
| "Cosmic" | 2024 | Lee Hye-in (2eehyeinfilm) | |
| "Surfin' Boy" | 2026 | Shin Dongle | |
| "Surfin' Boy" (Flamingosis Remix) | 2026 | Unknown | |
| "Surfin' Boy" (Rakunelama Remix) | 2026 | Unknown | |

=== Japanese music videos ===
List of Japanese music videos, showing year released, and name of director
| Title | Year | Director(s) | Ref. |
|---|---|---|---|
| "#Cookie Jar" | 2018 | Oh Ji-won | |
| "Sappy" | 2019 | Kim Woo-je | |
| "Wildside" | 2022 | VISHOP (Vikings League) | |

== Video albums ==
List of video albums, with selected peak chart positions and sales
| Title | Details | Peak chart positions | | Sales |
| Title | Details | JPN | | Sales |
| Title | Details | DVD | Blu-ray | Sales |
|---|---|---|---|---|
| Red Velvet 1st Concert "Red Room" in Japan | Released: September 12, 2018; Label: Avex Trax; Formats: DVD, Blu-ray | 8 | 15 | JPN: 3,431 |
| Red Velvet 2nd Concert "Redmare" in Japan | Released: July 31, 2019; Label: Avex Trax; Formats: DVD, Blu-ray | 12 | 21 | JPN: 2,880 |

== Films ==
| Title | Year | Role | Notes | Ref. |
|---|---|---|---|---|
| Trolls World Tour | 2020 | K-Pop Gang | Voice role | |

== Television ==
| Title | Year | Role | Notes | Ref. |
|---|---|---|---|---|
| Descendants of the Sun | 2016 | Themselves | Guest appearance (Episode 16) | |
