= Power Up (song) =

2018 single by Red Velvet

- Japanese version cover

Single by Red Velvet

from the EP Summer Magic and Sappy
- Released: August 6, 2018 (Korean); April 24, 2019 (Japanese)
- Recorded: 2018
- Studio: SM Studios, Seoul, South Korea
- Genre: Electropop; big beat; chiptune
- Length: 3:22
- Label: SM; iRIVER; Avex Trax
- Songwriters: Kenzie; Cazzi Opeia; Ellen Berg Tollbom; Jonatan Gusmark; Ludvig Evers
- Producer: Moonshine

Red Velvet singles chronology
"#CookieJar" (2018)	"Power Up" (2018)	"RBB (Really Bad Boy)" (2018)

Music video
- "Power Up" on YouTube

"Power Up" is a Korean song recorded by South Korean girl group Red Velvet for their second special (sixth overall) Korean extended play, titled Summer Magic (2018). Characterized as an electro-pop song with elements of chip-music, the song was penned by Kenzie and was produced by production duo Moonshine, Ellen Berg Tollbom and Swedish singer-songwriter Cazzi Opeia, who worked on the group's previous single "Peek-a-Boo". It was released on August 6, 2018, as the lead single of Summer Magic by SM Entertainment and iriver as the South Korea distributor, whilst the Japanese version was later released as the third and final single from the group's second Japanese extended play Sappy on April 24, 2019, by Avex Trax.

Upon its release, "Power Up" received positive reviews from critics for its catchy and addictive nature, further commenting the song as a "perfect" delivery for the summer. It was a commercial success in the group's native country, earning the group their first "Perfect All-Kill" title. The song eventually became the group's second and fifth chart-topper on the Gaon Digital Chart and Gaon Download Chart, further staying atop both charts for two weeks. It also peaked at number six on Billboard's World Digital Songs chart, giving the group their third No. 6 entry and their twelfth top-ten entry on the chart. The song's music video was included in Billboard's 50 Best Music Videos of 2018: Critics' Picks list, with Red Velvet being the only South Korean artist to make the list.

== Background and release ==
After making their official debut in Japan with the release of their first Japanese EP #Cookie Jar, the group's company SM Entertainment announced in July 2018 that Red Velvet will release their sixth Korean extended play in the next month which they revealed would be a special summer mini album titled Summer Magic. Amidst a tight schedule, the song and its parent album was recorded while the group was on tour.

The song was marketed as their second special summer single after "Red Flavor" which was released in 2017. The group shared during a press conference for their second solo concert "REDMARE" in Seoul that they felt burdened by the success of their first summer single but were confident that the new track would be "another summery earworm". Member Wendy compared "Power Up" to "Red Flavor" and said that if the latter "reminded people of fresh fruits" then the former would "give energy, like its title". Similarly, the group's leader Irene thought that in comparison to "Red Flavor", the song "takes a little more time to stick", initially not liking it immediately herself.

== Composition ==
"Power Up"
"Power Up" is an electropop song with elements of chip-music.

"Power Up" was composed by Moonshine (Ludvig Evers & Jonatan Gusmark), Ellen Berg Tollbom and Swedish artist Cazzi Opeia with lyrics by Kenzie that had a "work hard and play hard" theme. Seulgi mentioned that the "encouraging message" came from SM Entertainment's executive producer and founder Lee Soo-man, who often told the group at a company workshop "You have to enjoy yourself whether you are playing or working" which they included in the song's lyrics. All of its producers and its writer also penned and composed their 2017 single "Peek-a-Boo" which was the title track of their second studio album Perfect Velvet. Cazzi Opeia had previously revealed in June 2017 that she had written two songs for the group. The group disclosed during an interview with Paper that they had a company-wide voting to select their next title track which "Power Up" won. Member Joy stated that the song was recorded in various versions as they "studied the song's nuances".

Musically, "Power Up" was described as an electropop song with elements of chip-music. Tamar Herman of Billboard called the repetition of "banana-na-na" throughout the chorus "Minion-esque" and said they created a tune "built to reflect the lazy days of the season". She also noted the English-language line "level up" which she recognizes as a reference to the group's fanclub 'ReVeluv' which is pronounced similarly in Korean.

== Promotion ==
To promote the album, a series of image teasers were released on July 29, 2018, through the group's official social media accounts while their company SM Entertainment also launched an interactive game on their official website. Red Velvet performed the single along with other tracks from Summer Magic before its official release during their second concert 'REDMARE' on August 5, 2018, revealing them to the public for the first time.

An accompanying music video directed by Kim Ja-kyoung of Flexible Pictures and choreographed by Kyle Hanagami was released in conjunction with the single. Tamar Herman of Billboard said it had an "easy-to-follow" dance where they "soar like an airplane along to one line, punch the air as they proclaim the song's title and look like they're about to go swimming with one move from the 'banana' part of the song". The video also featured the members in various colorful outfits such as Girl Scout uniforms, sailor-inspired clothing, and cheerleader uniforms. Hong Dam-young of The Korea Herald felt that it had a coming-of-age story and pointed out the call-backs to their past title tracks such as "Dumb Dumb", "Ice Cream Cake", "Russian Roulette" and their last summer single "Red Flavor". The music video was filmed on July 19, 2018, in Gyeonggi Province.

Red Velvet made their comeback stage on August 10, 2018, through the music program Music Bank and continued promoting the single on Show! Music Core on August 11 and Inkigayo on August 12. The group accumulated over 10 music show wins for "Power Up", winning the last one on M! Countdown. It beat "Rookie"'s previous record of 9 wins.

== Critical reception ==
In the group's native country South Korea, critics opined that the song must be listened to more than once before it becomes addictive. Hong Dam-young of The Korea Herald compared it to "Red Flavor", saying it wasn't as catchy and commented that "One might need to push the replay button twice or three times in order to fully vibe with 'Power Up'. But soon you'll find yourself humming the song's quirky chorus anytime, anywhere, especially the part where the vocals hum "Banana-na-na" on top of the quirky chiptune. Claire Chung of Haps Magazine also originally found the song "a bit childish" but thought "the youthful, refreshing summer atmosphere of the music is infectious" and admitted she later found herself "subconsciously singing the song's addictive hook line".

On the other hand, Seung Park of Kotaku stated that the song "might just be their best song yet" and asserted that the group "stepped up to fill a sorely-needed niche in k-pop", calling Red Velvet "Orange Caramel's spiritual successors as the resident purveyors of the quirky and weird". Billboard's included the song's music video in their 50 Best Music Videos of 2018: Critics' Picks list at number 21 in December 2018, describing the song as "the logical K-pop extreme of Diane Martel's vision of a world where typical household objects are rarely what they seem". Red Velvet was the only South Korean artist to be included in the list.

== Commercial performance ==
"Power Up" topped all of South Korea's music charts upon its release, allowing the group to achieve a "Perfect All-Kill" for the first time in their career. The single then debuted atop both the Gaon Digital Chart and the Gaon Download Chart on its first week, becoming the group's second Gaon chart-topper following "Red Flavor" in 2017. It was also the group's longest number one run on Gaon, having spent two weeks at No. 1 on both charts. The song eventually became the most downloaded song for the month of August on Gaon. In addition, it also debuted atop the Kpop Hot 100 for two weeks, surpassing their highest peak and consequently giving Red Velvet their first chart-topper there.

Elsewhere, "Power Up" charted at number 6 on Billboard's World Digital Songs chart, selling 1,000 downloads in the United States in its first week. It also appeared on Singapore's "Top 30 Regional Streaming Chart" component, peaking at number 16 on the chart.

== Credits ==
Credits adapted from Summer Magic liner notes

- S.M. Entertainment Co., Ltd. – executive producer
- Lee Soo-man – producer
- Kenzie – vocal director
- Yoo Young-jin (S.M. Booming System) – recording engineer
- Lee Ji-hong (S.M. Lvyin Studio) – digital editing
- Jung Eui-seok (S.M. Blue Cup Studio) – mixing engineer, recording
- Kenzie – lyricist
- Moonshine (Ludvig Evers & Jonatan Gusmark) – composer, arrangement
- Ellen Berg Tollbom – composer
- Amanda Salsabila – composer, arrangement
- Cazzi Opeia – composer
- Red Velvet – vocals
  - Irene – vocals, background vocals
  - Seulgi – vocals, background vocals
  - Wendy – vocals, background vocals
  - Joy – vocals, background vocals
  - Yeri – vocals, background vocals
- Cazzi Opeia – background vocals
- Ellen Berg Tollbom – background vocals

== Charts ==
Chart (2018)	Peak position
Singapore Regional (RIAS)	16
South Korea (Gaon)	1
South Korea (Billboard Kpop Hot 100)	1
US World Digital Songs (Billboard)	6

== Certifications ==
Region	Certification	Certified units/sales
South Korea (KMCA)	Platinum	2,500,000^{*}
^{*} Sales figures based on certification alone.

== Accolades ==
Awards and nominations
Year	Organization	Award	Result	Ref.
2018	Korea Popular Music Awards	Group Dance Award	Won	
2018	Korea Popular Music Awards	Digital Award	Nominated	
2018	Genie Music Awards	Song of the Year	Nominated	
2018	Genie Music Awards	Female Dance Award	Nominated	
2019	Gaon Chart Music Awards	Song of the Month - August 2018	Won	
2019	Genie Music Awards	The Top Music	Nominated	
2019	Genie Music Awards	The Performing Artist (Female)	Nominated	

Melon Popularity Award
Award	Date	Ref.
Weekly Popularity Award	August 20, 2018	

=== Music program awards ===
Program	Date
Show Champion	August 15, 2018
Show Champion	August 22, 2018
M Countdown	August 16, 2018
M Countdown	August 23, 2018
Music Bank	August 17, 2018
Music Bank	August 24, 2018
Show! Music Core	August 18, 2018
Inkigayo	August 19, 2018
Inkigayo	August 26, 2018
The Show	August 21, 2018

== Release history ==
Region	Date	Format	Label
South Korea	August 6, 2018	Digital download, streaming	SM Entertainment, Iriver
Various	August 6, 2018	Digital download, streaming	SM
Japan	April 24, 2019	Digital download, streaming	Avex Trax

== See also ==
- List of Gaon Digital Chart number ones of 2018
- List of M Countdown Chart winners (2018)
- List of Inkigayo Chart winners (2018)
