= Summer Magic (EP) =

Extended play by Red Velvet

- Digital and Normal cover

EP by Red Velvet
- Released: August 6, 2018
- Studios: SM Studios (Seoul, South Korea)
- Genres: Pop; R&B
- Length: 23:46
- Languages: Korean; English
- Labels: SM; Dreamus

Red Velvet chronology
#Cookie Jar (2018)	Summer Magic (2018)	RBB (2018)

Singles from Summer Magic
- 1. "Power Up" Released: August 6, 2018

Summer Magic is the second special extended play and the seventh overall by South Korean girl group Red Velvet, marketed as their special "summer" EP following The Red Summer, which was released in July 2017. The EP is also the group's third major release to focus on their "Red" concept, following The Red Summer and the group's debut studio album The Red (2015). Released on August 6, 2018, the EP contains seven tracks, including the lead single "Power Up" and the English version of "Bad Boy" as a bonus track, making it their first song to be released in English.

The EP was a commercial success domestically and internationally, topping South Korea's Gaon chart's Album Chart, Single Chart and Download Chart. Elsewhere, it debuted at number three on the US Billboard World Albums chart. It also charted on the website's Heatseekers Albums chart at number 3, the Digital Albums at number 21, and became the group's first release to enter the Top Album Sales chart at number 91. The lead single "Power Up" also debuted at number 6 on its World Digital Songs chart. In France, the album charted at number 42 on the French Album Downloads Chart. The EP is also the group's first release to chart in the UK and Australia, debuting at number 38 on the UK Album Downloads Chart and at 31 on the Australian Top 50 Digital Albums Chart.

== Background ==
After the release of their first Japanese extended play #Cookie Jar, the group's company SM Entertainment announced in July that Red Velvet would release their new "summer mini album" in August. Osen reported that the members finished filming the music video for the single "Power Up" in Gyeonggi Province on July 19 and days later, SM Entertainment revealed that the EP would be released on August 6 and was titled Summer Magic. Member Yeri stated they were also doing concerts amidst preparations for the album, which put them on a really tight schedule.

== Composition ==
The lead single "Power Up" is described by PopCrush as an upbeat song with a "melody reminiscent of 8-bit-style video games" with lyrics that express a "work hard, play harder" theme; it is the group's second summer single after "Red Flavor". During the press conference for their second solo concert 'REDMARE' at the Olympic Park's handball arena in southeastern Seoul on August 5, member Yeri likened the melody to the tune of a Tetris game, stating that she "thought it's exactly the song you should listen to in summer" since it is "energizing and can play in the background for driving". Meanwhile, member Wendy compared it to their first summer single "Red Flavor" which was released in 2017 and admitted she "wasn't very impressed at first" but added "the more I listened to the song, the more energy of a different sort it gave me". The EP contains six other tracks, including an English version of "Bad Boy" which the group previously performed for the first time at KCON 2018 in New York in June of the same year. The song marks the group's first English-language release.

Claire Chung of Haps Magazine characterized the second track "With You" as an R&B song underlaid by trendy reggae synth pluck sounds with a moombahton rhythm. The third song "Mr.E", which is a play on the word 'mystery', "creates the illusion of being on a jungle safari" with its colorful animal and conga sounds. "Mosquito" is a new-style swing genre embedded with strong hip hop grooves. Chung also stated that the fifth track "Hit that Drum" is an "energetic song reminiscent of a South American samba festival" with its samba percussion instruments, cool brass sounds and heartbeat-like bass lines. "Blue Lemonade" is an urban pop dance song featuring a rhythmic synth base and bubbly background sounds.

== Release and promotion ==
To promote the EP, a series of image teasers were released on July 29, 2018, through the group's official social media accounts. SM Entertainment also launched an interactive game on their official site. Before its official release, the group performed the new songs from the album during their second concert 'REDMARE' on August 5, 2018, revealing them to the public for the first time.

The EP was released on August 6 worldwide, with the iTunes release featuring an additional podcast track, "Red Radio", which is described as a "special audio track". An accompanying music video for "Power Up" was released on the same day. The choreography was done by Kyle Hanagami who has choreographed several songs by the group, most recently the single "Peek-a-Boo". Red Velvet also held a special live broadcast on the day of its release to promote the EP through the Naver streaming app V Live. The physical copy was released in 6 versions with one being the standard version (released on August 6) and five limited edition versions, one for each member (released on August 10). Red Velvet started their music show promotions on August 10 through the music program Music Bank.

== Commercial performance ==
The single "Power Up" topped all of South Korea's music charts upon its release, achieving a "perfect all-kill". It topped the Gaon Album Chart while the lead single also topped both the Gaon Digital Chart and the Gaon Download Chart on its first week. With the exception of the English version of "Bad Boy" all of the album's tracks charted on the Gaon Digital Chart, however all 7 tracks charted on the Gaon Download Chart.

The EP sold more than 2,000 copies in the US in its first week, topping their previous record with Perfect Velvet and making it their best US sales week to date. It debuted at number 3 on Billboard's World Albums chart and also tied with their previous record on the Top Heatseekers Albums chart at number 3. It also charted at number 21 on the Digital Albums chart and debuted at number 91 on the Top Album Sales chart, the first time they have appeared on the latter chart. In France, Summer Magic peaked at number 42 on the French Album Downloads Chart. The EP also debuted at number 38 on the UK Album Downloads Chart and at number 31 on the Australian Top 50 Digital Albums Chart, making it their first album to chart in both countries. In Japan, the album charted at number 35 on Oricon's Weekly Albums chart. The EP sold 155,247 physical copies for the month of August on Gaon Chart.

== Reception ==
Professional ratings
Review scores
Source	Rating
IZM	3/5 stars

The EP received good reviews from critics in the group's home country, South Korea. Hong Dam-young of The Korea Herald opined that the EP proved that Red Velvet "does not linger in the past, but instead takes itself to the next level". He then added that the group lived up to their title "summer queens" and that the EP "is rife with all the elements that will elevate your mood". However, he also stated that one might need to repeat the title track "Power Up" a few times to fully vibe with it, but eventually it will have the listener "humming the song's quirky chorus anytime, anywhere, especially the part where the vocals hum "Banana-na-na" on top of the quirky chiptune". Similarly, Claire Chung of Haps Magazine initially found the song "a bit childish" but thought "the youthful, refreshing summer atmosphere of the music is infectious" and said she later found herself "subconsciously singing the song's addictive hook line". She also singled out the urban pop dance track "Blue Lemonade" as her favorite from the EP.

Seung Park of Kotaku remarked that the group "stepped up to fill a sorely-needed niche in k-pop" and called Red Velvet "Orange Caramel's spiritual successors as the resident purveyors of the quirky and weird".

== Track listing ==
Summer Magic track listing
No.	Title	Lyrics	Music	Arrangement	Length
1.	"Power Up"	Kenzie	Jonatan Gusmark; Ludvig Evers; Cazzi Opeia; Ellen Berg	Moonshine	3:22
2.	"With You" (한 여름의 크리스마스; Han yeoreumui keuriseumaseu; 'A Summer's Christmas')	January 8th; Song Carat	Nermin Harambašić; Anne Judith Wik; Jinbyjin; Hugo Solis; Gionata Caracciolo	Nermin Harambašić; Hugo Solis; Jinbyjin; Anne Judith Wik	3:27
3.	"Mr. E"	Kenzie	Kenzie; Sebastian Lundberg (Trinity Music); Fredrik Häggstam (Trinity Music); Johan Gustafsson (Trinity Music); Courtney Jenaé Stahl	Trinity Music	3:38
4.	"Mosquito"	Seo Ji-eum	Teddy Riley; Lee Hyun-seung; Dominique "Dom" Rodriguez; Daniel "Obi" Klein; Ylva Dimberg	Teddy Riley	3:11
5.	"Hit That Drum"	Misfit	Ronny Svendsen; Nermin Harambašić; Anne Judith Wik; Blair MacKichan	Ronny Svendsen; Nermin Harambašić; Anne Judith Wik; Blair MacKichan	3:12
6.	"Blue Lemonade"	Seo Ji-eum	Lee Joo-hyung (MonoTree); Nopari (MonoTree); Cazzi Opeia	Nopari (MonoTree)	3:16
7.	"Bad Boy" (English version) (bonus track)	Whitney Phillips	The Stereotypes; Maxx Song; Whitney Phillips; Yoo Young-jin	The Stereotypes	3:28
Total length:					23:46

Summer Magic – iTunes release
No.	Title	Length
8.	"Red Radio" (special audio track)	11:18
Total length:		35:02

== Charts ==
=== Weekly charts ===
Weekly chart performance for Summer Magic
Chart (2018)	Peak position
Australian Digital Albums (ARIA)	31
Japanese Albums (Oricon)	12
South Korean Albums (Gaon)	1
UK Album Downloads (Official Charts)	38
US Digital Albums (Billboard)	21
US Heatseekers Albums (Billboard)	3
US Independent Albums (Billboard)	10
US Top Album Sales (Billboard)	91
US World Albums (Billboard)	3

=== Monthly charts ===
Chart (2018)	Peak position
South Korean Albums (Gaon)	2

=== Year-end charts ===
Chart (2018)	Position
South Korean Albums (Gaon)	30

== Accolades ==
=== Year-end awards ===
Year	Award show	Category	Result
2018	Korea Popular Music Awards	Album Award	Nominated
2019	Golden Disc Awards	Album Bonsang	Nominated
