= RBB (Really Bad Boy) =

2018 single by Red Velvet

Single by Red Velvet

from the EP RBB
- Language: Korean; English
- Released: November 30, 2018
- Recorded: 2018
- Studio: SM Studios, Seoul, South Korea
- Genre: R&B; hip hop; dance-pop
- Length: 3:08
- Label: SM; iRiver
- Songwriters: Kenzie; Timothy 'Bos' Bullock; Sara Forsberg; MZMC
- Producers: Timothy 'Bos' Bullock; MZMC

Red Velvet singles chronology
"Power Up" (2018)	"RBB (Really Bad Boy)" (2018)	"Sappy" (2019)

Music video
- "RBB (Really Bad Boy)" on YouTube

"RBB (Really Bad Boy)" is a song recorded by South Korean girl group Red Velvet for their fifth Korean (eighth overall) extended play RBB (2018). Written by SM Entertainment songwriter Kenzie and Sara Forsberg with production by Timothy 'Bos' Bullock and MZMC, "RBB (Really Bad Boy)" is primarily an "addictive" R&B and dance-pop song with influence from jazz and hip hop, with the lyrics expressing the charm of a "bad boy".^{[6][7]} It was released as the lead single from its eponymous extended play on November 30, 2018, by SM Entertainment and Iriver Inc as the distributor, along with an accompanying horror-themed music video.

Upon its release, "RBB" received mixed to positive reviews from music critics who deemed it "controversial" and "unfamiliar" to the public. The song however, gained compliments for its "unapologetic" boldness thanks to the group's experimental path. Domestically, it achieved moderate success in its native country, becoming their eleventh top-ten entry on Gaon Digital Chart, while being a bigger success outside of their native country, peaking at number one on Billboard's World Digital Song Sales.

== Background and release ==
Three months after the release of their second summer special release Summer Magic, SM Entertainment confirmed that Red Velvet would return in November with a new extended play, titled "RBB" on November 30, 2018, and its eponymous lead single title. During a V Live broadcast, member Yeri stated that the preparation for the album was longer than their other releases, while member Seulgi noted that the song would be "very different". Following a music video teaser uploaded one day prior, the song's music video was released on November 30, 2018, to coincide with the parental extended play's digital release.

== Composition ==
"RBB (Really Bad Boy)"
"RBB (Really Bad Boy) is an "addictive" R&B and dance-pop track with "funky beat and brassy horns", which draws influence from hip-hop and jazz music.

"RBB (Really Bad Boy)" was composed and produced by SM Entertainment songwriter Kenzie, producer Timothy 'Bos' Bullock, singer-songwriter Sara Forsberg (known professionally as SAARA) and MZMC. In an interview with Balloon Days, Bullock revealed that "RBB" was the last song to be composed during his 2-week writing camp at Seoul, South Korea, without knowing "who the songs were going to end up going to". The demo version was originally guided by Bullock himself and co-composer Forsberg, with additional Korean lyrics written by Kenzie after. Originally recorded in Korean, an additional English version was also recorded and included as the sixth track of the extended play, marking the group's second song to be recorded in English following their earlier release "Bad Boy".

Described "RBB" as the sequel to their previous single "Bad Boy", "RBB (Really Bad Boy) is an "addictive" R&B and dance-pop track with "funky beat and brassy horns", which draws influence from hip-hop and jazz music. It was their sixth single to follow the "Velvet" sonic concept. With a tempo of 150 beats-per-minute, "RBB" is a fast verse-chorus form song in the key of D major. According to producer Bullock, he "wanted to create something with lots of fun energy" which made the listeners "want to move", thus using 808's for the bass of the song. The main melody was played by a trumpet and a trombone, being one of the first songs produced by Bullock to use such elements. In addition, the bridge was said to have a heavy influence on R&B and jazz music, which "would be a good contrast and add dynamics to the song", said the producer.

Lyrically, the song expresses the charm of a "bad boy" that attracts the girls' attention, no matter how all the other friends say. The group's vocals span from the low note B_{3} to the head voice note of D_{6} (D_{7} in exclamation, being the whistle/scream note by member Irene). Furthermore, the song is heavily ornamented with melisma and vocal harmonization, all of which appeared throughout the song from the intro to the last head run by member Wendy.

== Promotion and music video ==
To promote "RBB", a video teaser containing excerpts of the song was released on November 28, 2018, 2 days before the actual release date. A day after, Red Velvet held a special V Live broadcast in which they introduced the preview of all the songs before performing a small part of the choreography for "RBB". The group then performed the song live for the first time on the music program Music Bank, an hour before the official release time. It was then followed by performances on other music programs and year-end music awards, such as Show! Music Core, Inkigayo, and The Fact Music Awards.

The music video for "RBB" was choreographed by Janelle Ginestra, Kaycee Rice and Choi Sun-hee, while being directed by director Oui Kim of GDW production team, who had previously worked with labelmate NCT on several of their releases. The "whimsical, move-infused" video features a Halloween theme that consists of a werewolf as the main protagonist — the "bad boy" of the video chasing and haunting the girls while they are looking to find the werewolf as well. Choreography scenes are incorporated throughout the video between different retro-inspired and horror-theme sets, with one of them referring to the 1980 film The Shining as members Irene and Yeri reprised the Grady twins image. In several scenes, a Howliwood (a wordplay on the verb "howl" and the famous Hollywood billboard) sign can be seen up close in the background as well.

Upon its release, the video received positive reacts from magazines and blogs such as Billboard, Idolator and Forbes. The "fun, creepy ascetic" video was regarded as a "B-movie schlock retrofitted to K-pop perfectionism", according to Forbes contributor Caitlin Kelley.

== Critical reception ==
Following its release, "RBB (Really Bad Boy)" received generally mixed to positive reviews from international critics. Writer Mike Nied of Idolator described the song as "the banger" that boasts "a fiercely danceable production" with a "sing-along chorus", while Chase McMullen of The 405 chose the song as the "Track of the Day", praising it for upping "the ante on boisterous, feminist fun" from "Bad Boy", while still staying "in true Red Velvet fashion". In the same article for the video, Caitlin Kelley of Forbes remarked that "As a whole, "RBB" is like if cocktail music became anthemic pop and then soundtracked a horror movie. The harmonies are complex, and vocal ad libs fill every nook and cranny of empty space". Crystal Bell of MTV commented that while "RBB (Really Bad Boy)" is a song that really shouldn't work. It's a cacophony of sounds, rhythms, shrill ad-libs, complex harmonies, and a whole lot of brass" on the first listen, it was "unapologetically bold and loud" for a lead single that makes it "so unabashedly Red Velvet". She then concluded that with the group's "distinct vocal charms and tight harmonies, no two Red Velvet songs sound the same — and while "RBB" may be a divisive entry in the group's discography, you can't say it isn't 100 percent them". Writer Lo of Seoulbeats described the song as a track "bursting with hook", while applauding its "lighter harmonies".

The song also received mixed reviews, however. In an EP review of writer Kelley Burridge on United K-Pop, "RBB" was said to recall the group's previous hit "Dumb Dumb" with a "small let down of the chorus", though she later clarified that it wasn't "to say that the song is bad". In South Korea, writer Kim Sang-hwa of OhmyStar said the song received mixed reactions from the public but claimed that for those who follow the group and their music, this is normal for a Red Velvet release, that unpredictability is common for their title tracks and "RBB (Really Bad Boy)" is no exception. They added further that they're "controversial" because they're "unfamiliar", stating that they're welcome to those who are seeking something new.

== Commercial performance ==
The song performed moderately in its home country. With only one day counted for charting, "RBB" debuted at number 26 on the Gaon Digital Chart for the 48th week chart issue before moving up to number 10 where it peaked the following week, thus giving the group their eleventh top-ten entry on the chart. In addition, the song debuted at number 22 and eventually reached its peak position at number seven on Billboard Kpop Hot 100, marking their fifth top-ten entry on the chart. "RBB" fared better on the US Billboard World Digital Song Sales nonetheless, as the song became their first to atop the chart thanks to a total sell of 2,000 downloads in the US in the week ending December 6. Elsewhere, "RBB" peaked at number ninety-three on the Japan Hot 100 chart.

== Credits and personnel ==
Credits adapted from the liner notes of RBB.

Studio

- Recorded at SM Blue Cup Studio
- Recorded and engineered for mix at SM LYVIN Studio
- Edited at doobdoob Studio
- Mixed at SM Yellow Tail Studio

Personnel

- Red Velvet (Irene, Seulgi, Wendy, Joy, Yeri) – vocals, background vocals
- Kenzie – original writer, Korean songwriter, composition
- Sara Forsberg – original writer, English songwriter, composition, background vocals
- Timothy 'Bos' Bullock – original writer, composition, arrangement
- MZMC – original writer, composition
- Jeong Eui-seok – recording
- Lee Ji-hong – recording, mixing engineer
- Jang Woo-young – digital editing
- Koo Jong-pil – mixing

== Charts ==
=== Weekly charts ===
Weekly chart performance for "(RBB) Really Bad Boy"
Chart (2018)	Peak position
Japan (Japan Hot 100)	93
Singapore (RIAS Regional)	14
South Korea (Gaon)	10
South Korea (Kpop Hot 100)	7
US World Digital Songs (Billboard)	1

== Release history ==
Release dates and formats for "RBB (Really Bad Boy)"
Region	Date	Version	Format(s)	Label(s)	Ref.
Various	November 30, 2018	Korean	Digital download; streaming	SM Entertainment; IRIVER	
Various	November 30, 2018	English	Digital download; streaming	SM Entertainment; IRIVER	
