= RBB (EP) =

EP by Red Velvet
- Released: November 30, 2018
- Studios: SM Studios (Seoul, South Korea)
- Genres: R&B; dance-pop
- Length: 19:21
- Languages: Korean; English
- Labels: SM; Dreamus
- Producers: Timothy 'Bos' Bullock; Sara Forsberg; MZMC; Kenzie; Harvey Mason Jr.; Michael Wyckoff; Joshua Golden; J. Que; Dewain Whitmore Jr.; Britt Burton; Yoo Young-jin; Moonshine; Anne Judith Wik; Penomeco; Dem Jointz; LDN Noise; Deez; Ellen Berg Tollbom

Red Velvet chronology
Summer Magic (2018)	RBB (2018)	Sappy (2019)

Singles from RBB
- 1. "RBB (Really Bad Boy)" Released: November 30, 2018

RBB is the fifth Korean extended play and the eighth overall by South Korean girl group Red Velvet. The six-track EP was released on November 30, 2018, by SM Entertainment with iriver and Dreamus as the domestic distributor. Musically, the EP consists of five new original tracks which varied in different genres, mostly R&B and dance-pop, which became the group's third major release to focus on their "Velvet" sonic concept, following their second EP The Velvet (2016), their second studio album Perfect Velvet (2017) and its repackage The Perfect Red Velvet (2018).

Upon its release, RBB received positive reviews from music critics for its sonic cohesiveness, how all of the songs in the album are equally "strong" and hailed as the group's most "sassiest offering". The extended play was a commercial success in South Korea, becoming the group's tenth top-three title on the Gaon Album Chart with just one day of tracking. It debuting atop the Top Heatseekers Album chart and became the group's third number-two entry on the Billboard World Albums chart.

== Background and release ==
Following the group's promotion with their second "special summer" release Summer Magic in August 2018, news about Red Velvet's upcoming comeback circulated in October 2018, which was later confirmed by SM Entertainment. On November 9, 2018, SM Entertainment revealed the details of the extended play, its eponymous lead single, titled "RBB (Really Bad Boy)", and the release date to be November 30. During a V Live broadcast, member Yeri stated that the preparation for the album was longer than their other title tracks. In contrast to their previous release schedule, the album was released on Friday, November 30 rather than the usual Monday release for most K-pop acts. The release was a singular version only, containing a CD, a photo booklet, a lyric book and collectibles.

== Composition ==
The lead single "RBB (Really Bad Boy)" was characterized as an R&B pop dance track with a catchy melody. The song was written and composed by SM Entertainment songwriter Kenzie and co-composed by Timothy 'Bos' Bullock, Sara Forsberg, MZMC with arrangement by Bullock. Lyrically, it expresses the charms of a "bad boy".

The second song "Butterflies" was described as a punk-pop track, its lyrics comparing the sensation of falling in love to a butterfly dancing. "So Good" was characterized as a future bass track with an R&B base that features a piano melody and rhythmical drums in the instrumental. "Sassy Me" is an urban pop dance track that ranges from low to high notes that allow the group to show off their vocal ability. "Taste" is an old-school dance-pop song with lyrics that talk about the choices a person makes and not listening to others' opinions, following their heart instead. It features a narration written by member Wendy.

== Promotion ==
To promote the album, Red Velvet held a V Live broadcast on November 29, the night before its release. The group had their "comeback stage" for RBB on the music program Music Bank, performing both the title track "RBB (Really Bad Boy)" and "Butterflies" live for the first time and an hour before the album's official release. This was followed by performances on Show! Music Core and Inkigayo.

== Reception ==
Internationally, RBB received generally positive reviews from critics. Natalie Morin of Refinery29 opined that while their last album Summer Magic was "an expression of their bright, fun "red" side, RBB highlights their soft, sultry "velvet" side". She added that the EP acted as "a sequel to their January mega-hit 'Bad Boy'". She also said the group "has a penchant for high drama, and the video for "RBB (Really Bad Boy)" plays right into it. Set in a retro "Hollywood" movie set — imagine being so powerful that you bring back Halloween on the cusp of winter". Caitlin Kelley of Forbes remarked that "As a whole, "RBB" is like if cocktail music became anthemic pop and then soundtracked a horror movie. The harmonies are complex, and vocal ad libs fill every nook and cranny of empty space". She also talked about the rest of the album and stated that "Red Velvet has a reputation for never skimping on their B-sides", asserting that "All of the songs on the six-track RBB EP are strong enough to stand on their own" and called "Sassy Me" the standout track from the album, saying it's a "self-empowerment anthem" that imbues the group's "flair for experimentalism". The album ranked fifth on Idolator's '10 Best K-Pop Albums Of 2018' list.

== Commercial performance ==
Comparing to the group's previous release Summer Magic, the extended play was less commercially success in their native country. With only a tracking day due to the album being released on Friday instead, the extended play debuted and peaked at number three on the Gaon Album Chart and finished as the eighth best-selling release on the November 2018 issue of the Gaon Monthly Album Chart, having sold over 84,092 copies. By this, the EP was the group's tenth consecutive top-three entry, but their lowest peak to date on the chart. It eventually placed 49th on the 2018 year-end Gaon Album Chart, having sold a total of 94,367 copies.

The extended play, however, achieved bigger success for Red Velvet in the United States, topping the Billboard Top Heatseekers Album chart for the first time. According to Nielsen Music's report, RBB sold a total of 5,000 equivalent album units in the week ending December 6, with 3,000 in album sales, earning the group their best sales week in the States. It also charted at number two on the Billboard World Albums Chart, becoming their third top-two entry on the chart. Elsewhere, the album debuted at number fifty-one on the Billboard Japan Hot Albums chart, number ninety-two on the French Download Albums chart, and number sixty on the UK Album Downloads Chart, becoming the group's second entry in the United Kingdom following the release of Summer Magic.

== Track listing ==
RBB track listing
No.	Title	Lyrics	Music	Arrangement	Length
1.	"RBB (Really Bad Boy)"	Kenzie	Kenzie; Timothy "BOS" Bullock; Sara Forsberg; MZMC	Timothy "BOS" Bullock	3:08
2.	"Butterflies"	Jo Yoon-kyung	Harvey Mason Jr.; Michael "R!ot" Wyckoff; Joshua Golden; Patrick "J. Que" Smith; Dewain Whitmore Jr.; Britt Burton; Yoo Young-jin	Harvey Mason Jr.; Michael "R!ot" Wyckoff	3:29
3.	"So Good"	Kim In-hyung	Greg Bonnick; Hayden Chapman; Deez; Ellen Berg	LDN Noise; Deez; Ellen Berg	3:26
4.	"Sassy Me" (멋있게; Meositge; lit. 'Beautifully')	Kenzie	Kenzie; Jonatan Gusmark; Ludvig Evers; Anne Judith Wik	Moonshine	3:06
5.	"Taste"	Park Seong-hee; Penomeco	Dwayne Abernathy Jr.	Dem Jointz	3:04
6.	"RBB (Really Bad Boy)" (English version)	Sara Forsberg	Kenzie; Timothy "BOS" Bullock; Sara Forsberg; MZMC	Timothy "BOS" Bullock	3:08
Total length:					19:21

== Charts ==
=== Weekly charts ===
Chart (2018)	Peak position
French Download Albums (SNEP)	92
Japanese Albums (Oricon)	33
Japanese Hot Albums (Billboard Japan)	51
South Korean Albums (Gaon)	3
UK Album Downloads (Official Charts)	60
US Heatseekers Albums (Billboard)	1
US Independent Albums (Billboard)	8
US World Albums (Billboard)	2

=== Year-end charts ===
Chart (2018)	Position
South Korean Albums (Gaon)	49
