= Perfect Velvet =

Album by Red Velvet

Studio album by Red Velvet
- Released: November 17, 2017
- Studios: SM Studios (Seoul, South Korea)
- Genres: K-pop; R&B; hip-hop; soul
- Length: 30:56
- Languages: Korean; English
- Labels: SM; Dreamus; Iriver
- Producers: Kenzie; Cazzi Opeia; Moonshine; Jinbo; Sumin; Charli Taft; Daniel "Obi" Klein; Hitchhiker; The Stereotypes; Deez; Ylva Dimberg; Ellen Berg Tollbom; Aventurina King; Kim Boo-min; John Fulford; RE:ONE; Davey Nate; Kwon Deok-geun

Red Velvet chronology
The Red Summer (2017)	Perfect Velvet (2017)	#Cookie Jar (2018)

Singles from Perfect Velvet
- 1. "Peek-a-Boo" Released: November 17, 2017

Repackaged edition cover
- Digital cover

Singles from The Perfect Red Velvet
- 1. "Bad Boy" Released: January 29, 2018

Perfect Velvet is the second studio album by South Korean girl group Red Velvet. Released by SM Entertainment on November 17, 2017, the record incorporates R&B, soul and hip-hop with influences from future bass, trap and synth-pop, and saw contributions from various songwriters and production teams. The album is a portrayal of the group's "velvet" concept, making it their second major release to follow this sonic direction since their second extended play, The Velvet (2016). The album reissued as The Perfect Red Velvet on January 29, 2018.

Perfect Velvet was met with critical acclaim from music critics; music webzines Idology and Weiv named it the best album of 2017 while Billboard ranked it the fifth best K-pop album of the 2010s. Commercially, the album debuted at number two on the Gaon Album Chart and peaked at number one the Billboard World Album Chart. Two singles were released from Perfect Velvet: "Peek-a-Boo", and "Bad Boy" from its reissue. To promote the album, the group performed on several South Korean music programs.

Perfect Velvet was included in several music critics' year-end lists of the best K-pop albums of the year and earned the group several nominations, including Best Pop Album at Korean Music Awards and Album of the Year at the 2018 Mnet Asian Music Awards. A landmark performance by the group was held in North Korea where they performed "Bad Boy" at the "Spring is Coming" concert, to an audience that included Kim Jong-un.

== Background ==
=== Perfect Velvet ===
On October 30, 2017, news about the group's upcoming comeback appeared on various South Korean news sites, which was then confirmed by their company, SM Entertainment. On November 8, SM revealed that Red Velvet's upcoming album would be titled Perfect Velvet and would contain nine tracks, with the lead single titled "Peek-a-Boo". The name of the album references the "velvet" half of the group's concept which stems from the meaning behind their name, where "red" is their vivid and bold image while "velvet" stands for their softer and more mature side. In an interview with Xports News on November 8, SM stated that they intend to show "an upgraded version" of the group's "velvet" concept.

The group admitted to being unnerved by the success of their last single, "Red Flavor", as they were preparing for the album which the members participated in making through song selection. Group leader Irene told Billboard that unlike their past two releases earlier that year, they wanted to show an upgraded version of what they can show of their "velvet" image. Joy likewise expressed that she desired to showcase diverse concepts. Despite their concerns about the drastic change from their previous comeback, member Wendy stated that she thought it was "good timing" for the album to be released before the year ended as it "can show the perfect Red Velvet performances and songs".

=== The Perfect Red Velvet ===
In an interview with Idolator on January 16, 2018, American production team The Stereotypes revealed they had "a new one coming that's gonna be really cool" when asked about working with Red Velvet. Previously, they also produced two tracks from Perfect Velvet ("Kingdom Come" and "Attaboy"). SM announced on January 23, 2018, that Red Velvet will be releasing a repackage of the album titled The Perfect Red Velvet with "Bad Boy" as its lead single. "Bad Boy" was described as a song with a "sexy" or "girl crush" concept by South Korean news sites, which has never been done before by the group. On January 24, it was reported that the repackage of Perfect Velvet will be released on January 29 with three new songs, including "Bad Boy".

On January 26, individual teasers of members Wendy and Joy were released through the group's official SNS accounts which were noted by Kang Seo-jung of Osen as having the vibe of a powerful "eonni". In the same article, Kang also spoke of how their latest concept differs from the group's past releases. The teasers were followed by clips of Irene and Yeri the following day, with Seulgi's unveiled on January 28. The reissue was released on January 29, 2018, at 6PM KST both digitally and physically. The physical album was released in two formats-CD and Kihno kit.

== Composition ==
Perfect Velvet has nine songs which features mostly pop, hip-hop, soul and R&B genres. The album's first track, "Peek-a-Boo", was described as an up-tempo pop song with addictive hooks. Tamar Herman of Billboard stated that it is "laden with trop house elements underneath the overarching quirky pop vibe, and is driven by a deep bass drumline, scratchy synths, and metallic beats" which also features "a variety of diverse, playful instrumental elements nestled beneath the main melody". Lyrically, it compares a new romantic relationship to a game that children play.

"Look" is a disco-styled dance song written by Jinbo and Sumin who also composed the song along with Charli Taft and Daniel "Obi" Klein who have written several songs for the group since their first EP, Ice Cream Cake, including the single "Automatic". "I Just" is a pop song with a futuristic bass and distinctive synth sound composed by Aventurina King, Kim Boo-min, John Fulford with arrangement by South Korean EDM artist and DJ, Hitchhiker and its Korean lyrics written by Kim Boo-min. "I Just"'s lyrics express the empty emotions felt after a break-up. The fourth track, "Kingdom Come", has been noted as an R&B song with a gentle beat and a soft melody. The song samples "I Deserve More" by Tenin, released as part of her eponymous debut studio album in 2011. The lyrics for Red Velvet's Korean version was written by Lee Seu-ran of Jam Factory paired with entirely new melodies by Deez, Ylva Dimberg and was produced by The Stereotypes. "My Second Date" was characterized as a mid-tempo pop track, composed by James Wong, Sidnie Tipton and Sophie Stern with lyrics by Jeon Gan-di.

"Attaboy" is a hip-hop song with a hook melody. It was penned by S.M. Entertainment lyricist Kenzie who also composed the song with Ylva Dimberg and The Stereotypes. "Perfect 10" is an R&B song composed by Charli Taft, Daniel "Obi" Klein and Deez with lyrics by Cho Yoon-kyung. "About Love" is a mid-tempo pop song produced by re:one who also composed the song with Davey Nate. Its lyrics were written by January 8 of Jam Factory. The final track, "Moonlight Melody", is a low-key ballad with a delicate piano melody, written and composed by Lee Joo-hyung of Monotree and Kwon Deok-geun.

"Bad Boy" is characterized as an R&B song with elements of hip-hop and a synth melody along with a heavy bass sound. The song was composed by The Stereotypes, Maxx Song and Whitney Philips with Korean lyrics by Yoo Young-jin, and the lyrics describe the attraction between bad men and arrogant women. Mexican news site Milenio called the song's melody a mix of R&B and hip-hop, and described its lyrics as the story of the beginning of a couple's relationship. "All Right" is an up-tempo dance-pop song that lyrically encourages a person to look forward to the future with the people around them. Composed by Kevin Charge, Phoebus Tassopoulus and Jessica Jean Pfeiffer, its lyrics were written by Lee Seu-ran of Jam Factory. "Time to Love" is a mid-tempo R&B ballad composed by Ellen Berg Tollbom, Ming Ji-syeon and Lee Dong-hoon with lyrics written by Kim Eun-jung detailing excitement over a new relationship.

== Promotions ==
=== Perfect Velvet ===
The group began releasing teasers for their upcoming comeback on November 8 through their official social media accounts, which was followed by individual photo teasers of the members and a preview of a track from the album on each day until November 16. To further promote their comeback, the group held a showcase on November 16 which was hosted by label mate Taeyeon, where they discussed their album and performed the lead song, "Peek-a-Boo", live for the first time. On the same day, they appeared on a live broadcast through the Naver app, V Live.

The group had their first music show appearance on November 17, 2017, on Music Bank, where they performed "Peek-a-Boo" and "Look". As part of their promotions, Red Velvet appeared on the variety show Weekly Idol and were guests on several radio shows, where they performed "Peek-a-Boo" along with "Look" and "Kingdom Come". A remixed instrumental version of "I Just" was performed by the musician Hitchhiker, member Seulgi, and NCT 127's Taeyong at the 2017 Mnet Asian Music Awards, where the group also performed "Peek-a-Boo".

=== The Perfect Red Velvet ===
The album's title track "Bad Boy" had what Annie Martin of UPI called a "sultry" music video that featured the members in various coordinating outfits, which include all-black ensembles and pink pajamas, while performing against a snowy backdrop. The song was choreographed by Japanese hip-hop dancer and choreographer Rie Hata, who had previously worked with CL for the choreography of "The Baddest Female" and with the group's label mate BoA for her single "Nega Dola".

Red Velvet held a comeback showcase on January 29, 2018, the same day as the album's release, and was hosted by label mate Girls' Generation member Hyoyeon. It was broadcast live through the Naver app V-Live. During the show, the members discussed their new songs, including "Bad Boy" which they performed live for the first time. The group started their music show promotions through M! Countdown on February 1. The group also performed the song on Music Bank, Show! Music Core, Inkigayo and Show Champion where they won their first trophy for "Bad Boy" on February 7. To further promote the album and single, the members also appeared on several radio shows in South Korea such as SBS FM's Choi Hwa Jung Power Time, SBS' NCT's Night Night and SBS FM's Kim Chang Ryul's Old School Radio.

In 2018, Red Velvet embarked on their Redmare world tour to promote the album and its reissue alongside their first Japanese mini-album, #Cookie Jar, and their special summer mini-album, Summer Magic. A vertical music video for the song "I Just" was released on February 28, 2018.

== Reception ==
Professional ratings
Review scores
Source	Rating
The 405	8/10
IZM	3.5/5 stars
The Star	7.5/10

Perfect Velvet received critical acclaim from music critics. The release of the album was also seen as the group's softer, more mature and sophisticated "velvet" side finally being accepted by the public. Seon Mi-kyung of Osen considered the transition from their last song, "Red Flavor", to their "velvet" concept a bold move but felt that it showcased the group's growth as artists. Kukmin Ilbo complimented the songs on the album as "colorful and solid", and noted its visual references to classic B-grade movies. Weiv chose Perfect Velvet as their pick for the best domestic album of the year and was the only album by an idol group to be included on the list.

Kim Sang-hwa of Oh My Star praised Red Velvet's vocal performance and "future-oriented sound", and stated that the album is one of the most outstanding domestic music records released in the year. Writing for OhmyNews, Oh Joon-young discussed the prejudice that idols are not considered artists and how Red Velvet pushed the boundaries of what idol music should be with their diverse musical inspirations and styles, thus gaining the public's respect.

In December, Herman chose it as one of Billboard's 20 Best K-pop Albums of 2017: Critics' Picks. Chase McMullen of The 405 believed that too often than not, most of South Korea's popular girl groups were limited to two concepts, which are "cute" and "sexy" but "Red Velvet's only true interest appears to be dodging what's expected". He stated that "The album plays like something of a challenge, constantly seeking to top itself". Lastly, he maintained that the members continue to challenge themselves, all the while crafting "irresistible pop that doesn't lose an ounce of sheen once the buzz wears off". In January 2018, Perfect Velvet was chosen by Idology out of 729 Korean albums as the best album of 2017, where 11 of their writers voted.

Forbes stated that The Stereotypes' work on The Perfect Red Velvet "helped hone the girl group's lush contemporary R&B-meets-pop sound". In December 2018, Billboard included the title track "Bad Boy" in their '100 Best Songs of 2018: Critics' Picks' list while MTV picked "All Right" as one of the 'Best K-Pop B-Sides of 2018'. The Perfect Red Velvet was also included in Refinery29's '12 Best K-Pop Albums of 2018'. In 2020, Perfect Velvet topped a Billboard readers poll for favorite girl group album of all time.

== Accolades ==
Awards and nominations
Year	Award show	Category	Work	Result	Ref.
2018	Golden Disc Awards	Album Bonsang	Perfect Velvet	Nominated	
2018	Korean Music Awards	Best Pop Album	Perfect Velvet	Nominated	
2018	Mnet Asian Music Awards	Album of the Year	The Perfect Red Velvet	Nominated	

Critic rankings
Publication	List	Work	Rank	Ref.
Billboard	The 20 Best K-pop Albums of 2017	Perfect Velvet	10	
Billboard	25 Greatest K-pop Albums of the 2010s	Perfect Velvet	5	
Idology	Best K-pop Albums of 2017	Perfect Velvet	1	
Paste	The 30 Greatest K-pop Albums of All Time	Perfect Velvet	5	
Weiv	Best Albums of 2017	Perfect Velvet	1	
Tonplein	Best Albums of the 2010s (ColoringCyan)	Perfect Velvet	16	
Tonplein	Best Albums of the 2010s (Choi Ji-hwan)	The Perfect Red Velvet	19	
Refinery29	The 12 Best K-Pop Albums of 2018	The Perfect Red Velvet	3	

== Commercial performance ==
Domestically, Perfect Velvet was a commercial success, peaking at number two on the Gaon Album Chart upon its release. It eventually became the fifth best-selling album on the November issue of the Gaon Monthly Album Chart, and ultimately the thirty-sixth best-selling album of 2017 in South Korea, having sold a total of 90,456 copies by the end of the year. As of April 2018, Perfect Velvet has sold a total of 101,032 copies, making it Red Velvet's first album to surpass 100,000 copies sold in South Korea. Under its re-release title The Perfect Red Velvet, the album became Red Velvet's seventh chart-topping title and spent a week atop the Gaon Album Chart. The re-release was the sixth best-selling album of January 2018, having sold a total of 55,128 copies, and eventually finished as the fifty-third best-selling release of 2018, achieving a total sales of 91,325 copies.

In addition to the album's domestic success, Perfect Velvet topped the Billboard World Albums Chart for the week of December 9, 2017, becoming the group's third consecutive chart-topper in 2017 and fourth overall, following The Red (2015), Rookie and The Red Summer (2017). Red Velvet extended their record as the K-pop girl group with the most number one entries on the chart, breaking tie with their fellow labelmate Girls' Generation. The album also made its debut on the Billboard's Top Heatseekers Albums chart at number three, becoming their first release to enter the top five. With over 2,000 copies sold in its first week, Perfect Velvet earned their best US sales week at the time, later surpassed by the group's fifth extended play RBB in the same year. Following the release of the album, Red Velvet appeared on the Billboard Social 50 chart at number thirty-three, a new peak for the group. In Japan, the album debuted on Oricon Albums Chart at number 20 with 2,867 copies. The album also debuted at number 95 on the French Download Albums chart, making it their first release to enter the component chart.

Upon its re-release as The Perfect Red Velvet, the album debuted and peaked at number three on Billboard's World Albums chart, becoming their seventh top-three entry. It also entered the French Download Albums chart, achieving a peak position of number 87. The re-release also helped Perfect Velvet re-enter the top 50 on the Oricon Albums Chart, reaching number 29 on the fifth week of January 2018.

== Track listing ==
Perfect Velvet track listing
No.	Title	Lyrics	Music	Arrangement	Length
1.	"Peek-a-Boo" (피카부; Pikabu)	Kenzie	Jonatan Gusmark; Ludvig Evers; Cazzi Opeia; Ellen Berg	Moonshine	3:09
2.	"Look" (봐; Bwa)	Sumin; Jinbo	Charli Taft; Daniel "Obi" Klein; Jinbo; Sumin	Daniel "Obi" Klein	4:05
3.	"I Just"	Kim Bu-min	Hitchhiker; Aventurina King; Kim Bu-min; John Fulford	Hitchhiker	3:08
4.	"Kingdom Come"	Lee Seu-ran	The Stereotypes; Deez; Ylva Dimberg	The Stereotypes	3:30
5.	"My Second Date" (두 번째 데이트; Du beonjjae deiteu)	Jeon Gan-di	James Wong; Sidnie Tipton; Sophie Stern	James Wong	3:14
6.	"Attaboy"	Kenzie	Kenzie; The Stereotypes; Ylva Dimberg	The Stereotypes	3:16
7.	"Perfect 10"	Jo Yoon-kyung	Daniel "Obi" Klein; Charli Taft; Deez	Daniel "Obi" Klein; Deez^{[a]}	3:29
8.	"About Love"	January 8th (Jam Factory)	Re:one; Davey Nate	Re:one	3:25
9.	"Moonlight Melody" (달빛 소리; Dalbit sori)	Lee Joo-hyung (MonoTree)	Lee Joo-hyung (MonoTree); Kwon Deok-geun	Kwon Deok-geun	3:40
Total length:					31:03

The Perfect Red Velvet – standard edition
No.	Title	Lyrics	Music	Arrangement	Length
1.	"Bad Boy"	JQ (MUMW); Moon Hee-yeon (MUMW)	The Stereotypes; Maxx Song; Whitney Phillips; Yoo Young-jin	The Stereotypes	3:30
2.	"All Right"	Lee Seu-ran	Kevin Charge; Phoebus Tassopoulos; Jessica Jean Pfeiffer	Kevin Charge	3:49
3.	"Peek-a-Boo" (피카부; Pikabu)	Kenzie	Jonatan Gusmark; Ludvig Evers; Cazzi Opeia; Ellen Berg	Moonshine	3:09
4.	"Look" (봐; Bwa)	Sumin; Jinbo	Charli Taft; Daniel "Obi" Klein; Jinbo; Sumin	Daniel "Obi" Klein	4:05
5.	"I Just"	Kim Bu-min	Hitchhiker; Aventurina King; Kim Bu-min; John Fulford	Hitchhiker	3:08
6.	"Kingdom Come"	Lee Seu-ran	The Stereotypes; Deez; Ylva Dimberg	The Stereotypes	3:30
7.	"Time to Love"	Kang Eun-jeong	Ellen Berg; MinGtion; Lee Dong-hoon	MinGtion	3:15
8.	"My Second Date" (두 번째 데이트; Du beonjjae deiteu)	Jeon Gan-di	James Wong; Sidnie Tipton; Sophie Stern	James Wong	3:14
9.	"Attaboy"	Kenzie	Kenzie; The Stereotypes; Ylva Dimberg	The Stereotypes	3:16
10.	"Perfect 10"	Jo Yoon-kyung	Daniel "Obi" Klein; Charli Taft; Deez	Daniel "Obi" Klein; Deez^{[a]}	3:29
11.	"About Love"	January 8th (Jam Factory)	Re:one; Davey Nate	Re:one	3:25
12.	"Moonlight Melody" (달빛 소리; Dalbit sori)	Lee Joo-hyung (MonoTree)	Lee Joo-hyung (MonoTree); Kwon Deok-geun	Kwon Deok-geun	3:40
Total length:					41:37

The Perfect Red Velvet – iTunes and Apple Music EP edition
No.	Title	Lyrics	Music	Arrangement	Length
1.	"Bad Boy"	JQ (MUMW); Moon Hee-yeon (MUMW)	The Stereotypes; Maxx Song; Whitney Phillips; Yoo Young-jin	The Stereotypes	3:30
2.	"All Right"	Lee Seu-ran	Kevin Charge; Phoebus Tassopoulos; Jessica Jean Pfeiffer	Kevin Charge	3:49
3.	"Time to Love"	Kang Eun-jeong	Ellen Berg; MinGtion; Lee Dong-hoon	MinGtion	3:15
4.	"Bad Boy" (Instrumental)		The Stereotypes; Maxx Song; Whitney Phillips; Yoo Young-jin	The Stereotypes	3:30
5.	"Peek-a-Boo" (피카부; Pikabu) (Instrumental)		Jonatan Gusmark; Ludvig Evers; Cazzi Opeia; Ellen Berg	Moonshine	3:09
Total length:					17:00

=== Notes ===
- "Kingdom Come" samples "I Deserve More" by Tenin, released as part of her eponymous debut studio album in 2011.
- ^{^[a]} signifies an additional arrangement credit.

== Personnel ==
Credits adapted from the liner notes of Perfect Velvet.

- S.M. Entertainment Co., Ltd. – executive producer
- Lee Soo-man – producer
- Yoo Young-jin – music and sound supervisor
- Lee Seong-soo – producing director
- Jeong Eui-seok (S.M. Blue Cup Studio) – recording engineer
- Lee Min-gyu (S.M. Big Shot Studio) – recording engineer
- Lee Ji-hong (S.M. LYVIN Studio) – recording engineer
- Park Eun-kyeong (Lead Sound) – recording engineer
- Eazy $ign - EQ mixing engineer
- Oh Seong-geun (T Studio) – recording engineer
- Baek Kyeong-hoon (T Studio) – recording engineer
- Lee Joo-young (MonoTree Studio) – recording engineer assistant
- Nam Koong-jin (S.M. Concert Hall Studio) – mixing engineer
- Koo Jong-pil (Beat Burger) (S.M. Yellow Tail Studio) – mixing engineer
- Kim Cheol-soon (S.M. Blue Ocean Studio) – mixing engineer
- Jeong Ui-seok (S.M. Blue Cup Studio) – mixing engineer
- Chris Gehringer (Sterling Sound) – master engineer
- Min Hee-jin – creative director
- Min Hee-jin – music video direction and arrangement
- Kim Hye-min – music video direction and arrangement
- Kim Ju-young – music video direction and arrangement
- Kim Ji-yong – music video director
- Min Hee-jin – art direction and design
- Jo Woo-cheol – art direction and design
- Kim Ye-min – art direction and design
- Cho Woo-shik – art direction and design
- Son Sae-rom – art direction and design
- Kim In-woo – art direction and design
- Kim Ye-jin – stylist
- Soon-ee – hair stylist
- Seo-ha – hair stylist
- Shin Kyung-mi – make-up artist
- Sung Si-young – photography
- Han Jong-cheol – photography
- Kim Hye-soo – music video sketch photography
- Teaser promotions
  - Min Hee-jin – planning and directing
  - Kim Ye-min – planning and directing
  - Kim Ju-young – video clip
  - Park Yoon-seok – video clip
  - Kim Na-yeon – video clip
- Nam So-young – management and marketing executive
- Han Se-min – management and marketing executive
- Kim Young-min – executive supervisor
- Red Velvet – vocals
  - Irene – vocals
  - Seulgi – vocals
  - Wendy – vocals
  - Joy – vocals
  - Yeri – vocals

== Charts ==
Chart (2017–2018)	Peak chart positions	
Chart (2017–2018)	Perfect Velvet	The Perfect Red Velvet
French Download Albums (SNEP)	95	87
Japanese Albums (Oricon)	20	29
South Korean Albums (Gaon)	2	1
US World Albums (Billboard)	1	3
US Top Heatseekers Albums (Billboard)	3	7
US Independent Albums (Billboard)	39	32

== Release history ==
Region	Date	Edition	Format	Label
Various	November 17, 2017	Perfect Velvet	Digital download, streaming	SM Entertainment
South Korea	November 17, 2017	Perfect Velvet	CD, digital download, streaming audio	SM Entertainment, Genie Music
Various	January 29, 2018	The Perfect Red Velvet	Digital download, streaming	SM Entertainment
South Korea	January 29, 2018	The Perfect Red Velvet	CD, digital download, streaming audio, SMC	SM Entertainment, Genie Music
