= List of Inkigayo Chart winners (2017) =

Inkigayo Chart winners (2017)

Highlights
- Artist(s) with most wins: Twice (11)
- Song with highest score: "Fxxk It" by BigBang (10,500)

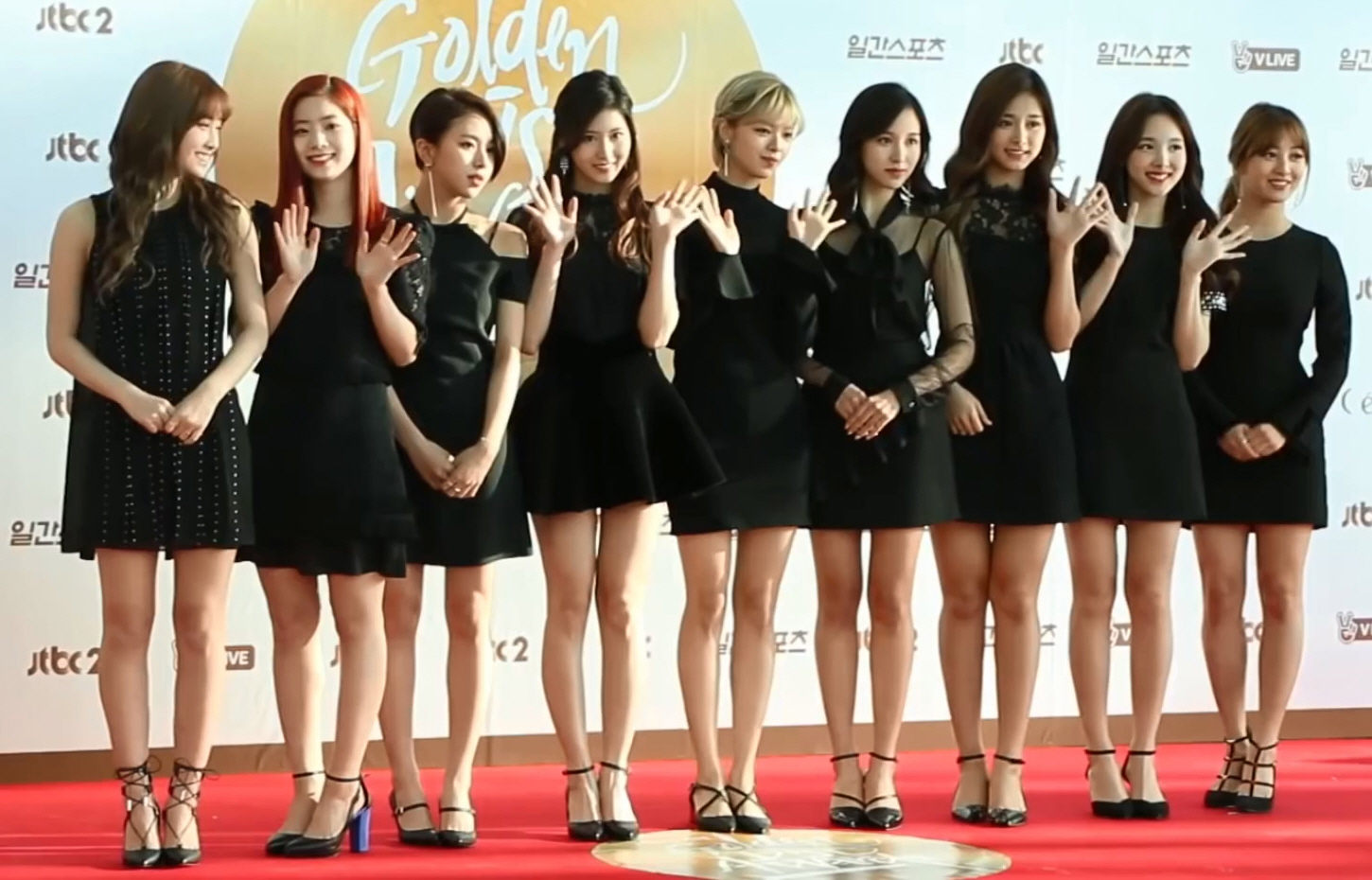
Girl group Twice ranked four singles at number one, the most of any act in 2017. Three of the songs achieved a Triple Crown in 2017 with the fourth song going on to achieve a triple crown the following year.

The Inkigayo Chart is a music program record chart that gives an award to the best-performing single of the week in South Korea. The 2017 chart measured digital performance in domestic online music services (5,500 points), social media via YouTube views (3,500 points), advanced viewer votes (500 points), and album sales (500 points) in its ranking methodology. The candidates for the number-one song of the week received additional points from live votes (1,000 points). Utilization of live votes was discontinued in February. Songs that spend three weeks at number one are awarded a Triple Crown and are removed from the chart and ineligible to win again. Twice member Jeongyeon, actress Gong Seung-yeon, and actor Kim Min-seok had hosted the show since July 2016 and continued to do so until January 22, 2017. Got7 member Park Jin-young, Blackpink member Jisoo, and NCT member Doyoung were announced as new hosts the following week.

In 2017, there were 30 singles that ranked number one on the chart and 22 music acts received award trophies for this feat. Eight songs collected trophies for three weeks and earned a Triple Crown: BigBang's "Fxxk It", IU's "Palette", Blackpink's "As If It's Your Last", Sunmi's "Gashina", BTS's "DNA", and Twice's "Knock Knock", "Signal", and "Likey". Five acts ranked more than one single at number one on the chart in 2017. Boy groups Exo and BTS achieved two singles at number one with "Ko Ko Bop" and "Power", and "Spring Day" and "DNA", respectively. BTS's "DNA" went on to achieve a triple crown in October. Soloist IU achieved two number one singles on the chart in 2017 with "Through The Night" and "Palette"; the latter went on to rank number one for three consecutive weeks and achieved a triple crown on the May 14 broadcast. Girl group Red Velvet ranked three number one singles on the chart in 2017: "Rookie", "Red Flavor", and "Peek-a-Boo". The only other girl group to rank more than one single at number one was Twice. They ranked four singles at number one on the chart throughout the year. Their singles "Knock Knock", "Signal", and "Likey" ranked number one for three weeks each and achieved triple crowns in 2017, while "Heart Shaker" went on to achieve a triple crown the following year. The four songs spent a total of 11 weeks atop the chart, making Twice the act with the most wins of the year. Of all releases for the year, BigBang's "Fxxk It" acquired the highest point total on the January 8 broadcast with a score of 10,500. The single also achieved a triple crown.

Boy group Wanna One received its first Inkigayo trophy with its debut song "Energetic". BtoB's number one with "Missing You" on the October 29 broadcast helped them achieve their first number one on the chart more than six years after their debut. "Some" gained music duo Bolbbalgan4 its first award on the program. Singer Jung Key won his first award with "Anymore" despite a lack of promotional activities on music programs. "Gashina" earned Sunmi her first music show award since leaving JYP Entertainment and signing with MakeUs Entertainment. She also achieved her first Triple Crown. Soloist Minseo took her first award win for "Yes".

== Chart history ==
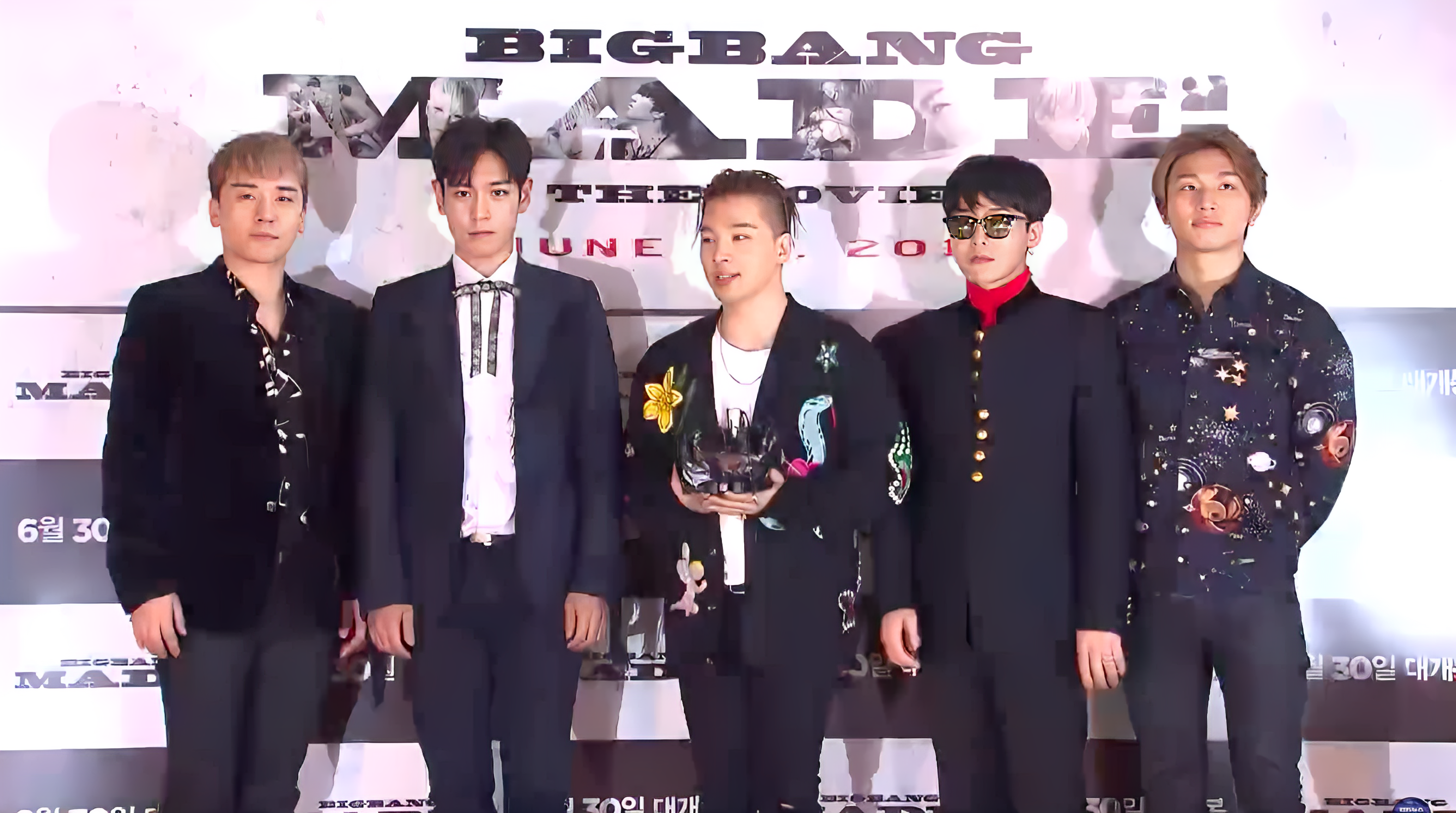
"Fxxk It" accumulated 10,500 points on the January 8 broadcast, earning boy group BigBang the highest score of 2017.

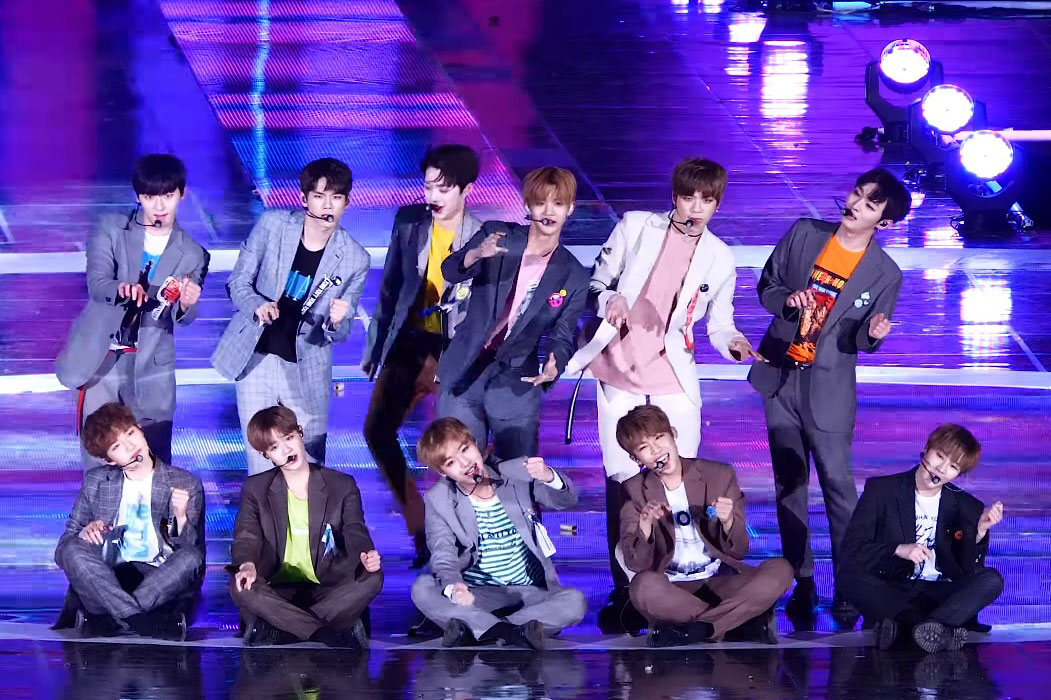
Boy group Wanna One received its first Inkigayoo awards for its debut song "Energetic".

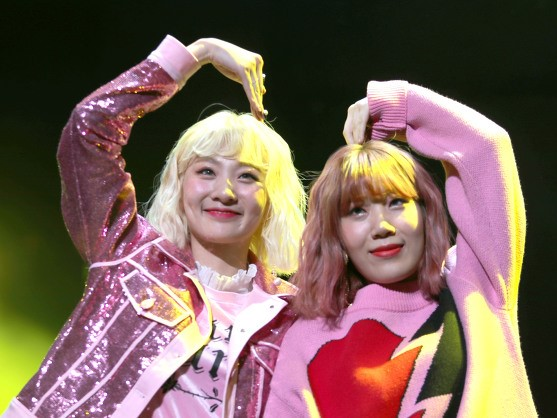
Music duo Bolbbalgan4 earned its first award on the program with "Some".

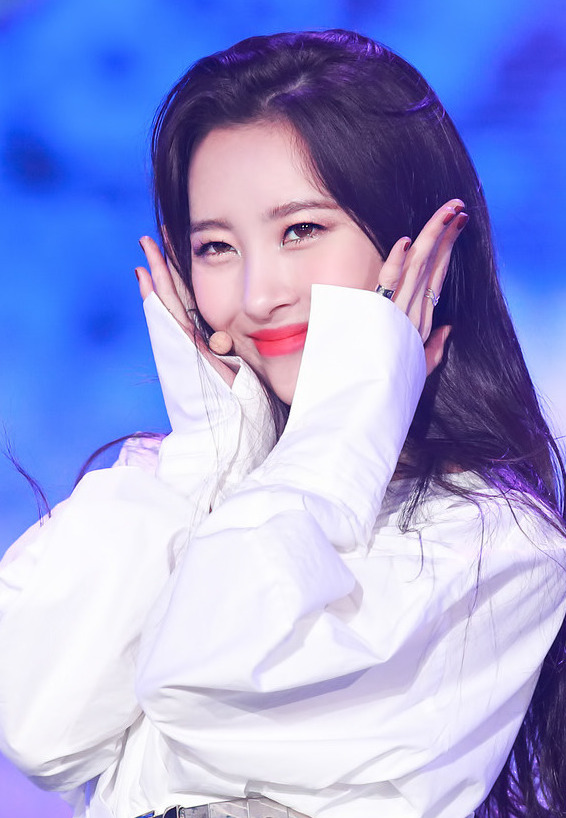
Sunmi's win with "Gashina" was her first since signing with MakeUs Entertainment. She also collected her first Triple Crown.

Key
†	Indicates the song achieved a Triple Crown
‡	Indicates the highest score of the year
—	No show was held

Chart history
Episode	Date	Artist	Song	Points	Ref.
894	January 1	BigBang	"Fxxk It" † (Note: "Fxxk It" ranked number one for a week in 2016.)	10,186	
895	January 8	BigBang	"Fxxk It" †	10,500 ‡	
896	January 15	Shinhwa	"Touch"	7,378	
897	January 22	Shinhwa	"Touch"	8,873	
—	January 29	I.O.I	"Downpour"	5,558	
898	February 5	Dynamic Duo & Chen	"Nosedive"	6,703	
899	February 12	Red Velvet	"Rookie"	8,075	
900	February 19	Red Velvet	"Rookie"	8,901	
901	February 26	BTS	"Spring Day"	8,643	
902	March 5	Twice	"Knock Knock" †	9,688	
903	March 12	Twice	"Knock Knock" †	8,976	
—	March 19	Twice	"Knock Knock" †	9,421	
904	March 26	Jung Key	"Anymore"	5,407	
905	April 2	Highlight	"Plz Don't Be Sad"	9,274	
906	April 9	IU	"Through The Night"	7,576	
—	April 16	Winner	"Really Really"	8,811	
907	April 23	Winner	"Really Really"	7,836	
908	April 30	IU	"Palette" †	6,250	
909	May 7	IU	"Palette" †	9,790	
910	May 14	IU	"Palette" †	8,691	
911	May 21	Psy	"I Luv It"	8,546	
912	May 28	Twice	"Signal" †	9,190	
913	June 4	Twice	"Signal" †	10,421	
914	June 11	Twice	"Signal" †	9,499	
915	June 18	G-Dragon	"Untitled, 2014"	9,000	
916	June 25	G-Dragon	"Untitled, 2014"	8,768	
917	July 2	Blackpink	"As If It's Your Last" †	7,685	
918	July 9	Blackpink	"As If It's Your Last" †	8,652	
919	July 16	Blackpink	"As If It's Your Last" †	7,944	
920	July 23	Red Velvet	"Red Flavor"	9,467	
921	July 30	Exo	"Ko Ko Bop"	8,372	
922	August 6	Exo	"Ko Ko Bop"	8,346	
923	August 13	GFriend	"Love Whisper"	8,915	
924	August 20	Wanna One	"Energetic"	9,965	
925	August 27	Wanna One	"Energetic"	6,494	
926	September 3	Sunmi	"Gashina" †	6,943	
927	September 10	Sunmi	"Gashina" †	7,385	
—	September 17	Exo	"Power"	6,483	
928	September 24	Sunmi	"Gashina" †	7,335	
929	October 1	BTS	"DNA" †	7,422	
930	October 8	BTS	"DNA" †	7,421	
931	October 15	BTS	"DNA" †	6,475	
—	October 22	Bolbbalgan4	"Some"	6,514	
932	October 29	BtoB	"Missing You"	9,238	
933	November 5	BtoB	"Missing You"	6,594	
934	November 12	Twice	"Likey" †	9,808	
935	November 19	Twice	"Likey" †	8,744	
936	November 26	Twice	"Likey" †	7,707	
937	December 3	Minseo	"Yes"	5,936	
938	December 10	Red Velvet	"Peek-a-Boo"	8,295	
939	December 17	Zion.T	"Snow"	6,637	
—	December 24	Twice	"Heart Shaker" † (Note: "Heart Shaker" ranked number one for a week in 2018.)	10,236	
—	December 31	Twice	"Heart Shaker" †	8,878	
