= Cookie Jar (EP) =

#Cookie Jar
- Digital and Regular edition cover

EP by Red Velvet
- Released: July 4, 2018
- Genre: J-pop; electropop; synth-pop
- Length: 19:49
- Language: Japanese; English
- Label: Avex Trax; SM Entertainment Japan

Red Velvet chronology
Perfect Velvet (2017)	#Cookie Jar (2018)	Summer Magic (2018)

Singles from #Cookie Jar
- 1. "#Cookie Jar" Released: July 4, 2018

#Cookie Jar (Hashtag Cookie Jar) is the debut Japanese extended play and the sixth overall by South Korean girl group Red Velvet. Following the group's initial Japan showcase in October 2017, SM Entertainment announced that the group would "formally" debut in Japan in July 2018 with a Japanese release. The extended play was then released on July 4, 2018, by Avex Trax and features a total of six Japanese tracks; containing three re-recorded versions of their previous hits – namely "Dumb Dumb", "Russian Roulette", and "Red Flavor", while also featuring three original Japanese tracks.

== Background and release ==
On May 23, 2018, the group announced the release of their debut Japanese album titled #Cookie Jar for July 4, through their official Japanese website, declaring it to be their first mini-album in the region.

The first three tracks on the mini-album are new, while tracks four to six are Japanese versions of the previous singles "Dumb Dumb", "Russian Roulette" and "Red Flavor", off The Red, Russian Roulette and The Red Summer releases, respectively.

The mini-album was released on July 4, 2018. There are two editions of the album released. The first one is the First Press Limited Edition, which contains a CD, a 24-page booklet and a random photo card out of 6 types packed in a deluxe mini box packaging. The second one is the Regular Edition, a jewel case that contains a CD, a 16-page booklet and a random photo card out of 6 types.

== Commercial performance ==
#Cookie Jar debuted and peaked at number 3 on Oricon's Weekly Album Chart, selling 26,124 physical copies. It also entered and peaked at number 4 on Billboard Japan's Hot Albums and at number 13 on US World Albums. The mini-album has sold over 28,130 copies in its first two weeks. The title track charted at number 20 on Billboard's World Digital Songs chart and number 88 on the international Gaon Digital Chart.

== Track listing ==
#Cookie Jar track listing
No.	Title	Lyrics	Music	Arrangement	Length
1.	"#Cookie Jar"	MEG.ME	Efraim Faramir Sixten Fransesco Vindalf Cederqvist Leo; JFMee; Gavin Jones; Saima Irén Mian; Ronny Vidar Svendsen; Anne Judith Wik; Nermin Harambašić	Dsign Music; Efraim Faramir Sixten Fransesco Vindalf Cederqvist Leo	3:33
2.	"Aitai-tai" (trans.: I Really Miss You)	H.Toyosaki; Hyun Hwang (MonoTree)	Hyun Hwang (MonoTree)	MonoTree	3:14
3.	"'Cause It's You"	Izumi Soratani (Agehasprings))	Anne Judith Wik; Ronny Vidar Svendsen; Nermin Harambašić; Jin Suk Choi; Justin Stein; Park Geun-tae	Dsign Music	2:59
4.	"Dumb Dumb" (Japanese version)	Seo Ji-eum; Kim Dong-hyun; Hidenori Tanaka (Agehasprings)	LDN Noise; Deanna Dellacioppa; Taylor Parks; Ryan S. Jhun	LDN Noise; Deanna Dellacioppa; Taylor Parks; Ryan S. Jhun	3:22
5.	"Russian Roulette" (Japanese version)	Jo Yoon-kyung; Hajime Watanabe (ZAZA)	Albi Albertsson (Mussashi); Belle Humble; Markus Lindell (TG Publishing)	Albi Albertsson (Mussashi); Belle Humble; Markus Lindell (TG Publishing)	3:31
6.	"Red Flavor" (Japanese version)	Kenzie; Kami Kaoru	Daniel Caesar (Caesar & Loui); Ludwig Lindell (Caesar & Loui)	Caesar & Loui (The Kennel)	3:11
Total length:					19:49

== Charts ==
Chart (2018)	Peak position
Japanese Albums (Oricon)	3
Japan Hot Albums (Billboard)	4
US World Albums (Billboard)	13
