= Rebirth (song) =

Song by Red Velvet

Single by Red Velvet
- Language: Korean
- Released: August 18, 2017
- Recorded: 2017
- Studio: SM Studios, Seoul, South Korea
- Genre: Tropical-pop
- Length: 7:06
- Label: SM; Genie Music
- Songwriters: Yoon Jong-shin; JQ
- Producers: Yoon Jong-shin; Yoo Hee-Yeol; Choi Jin-seok

Red Velvet singles chronology
"Red Flavor" (2017)	"Rebirth" (2017)	"Peek-A-Boo" (2017)

Music video
- "Rebirth" on YouTube

"Rebirth" (Korean: 환생; RR: Hwansaeng) is a song originally written and recorded by South Korean singer and record producer Yoon Jong-shin for his fifth studio album Woo (Stupid) in April 1996. Originally a retro-influenced doo-wop record composed by both Yoon and songwriter You Hee-yeol, the song was later rearranged by singer-songwriter Henry Lau as part of his collaboration with Yoon Jong-shin for the V Live-exclusive show Snowball Project in 2017. It was eventually given to girl group Red Velvet, who covered and released the song on August 18, 2017, through their label's STATION Season 2 project, becoming the twenty-first digital single for the season and seventy-second overall. It was also the group's second release through the digital project, after "Would U" in April 2017. The song achieved minor success, peaking at number seventy-eight and twenty-five on the Gaon Digital Chart and the Billboard World Digital Songs chart respectively, becoming their lowest charting single on both charts to date.

== Background and release ==
Together with Yoon Jong-shin and his artist Parc Jae-jung, Henry introduced Snowball Project – a show which "depicts the musical journey" of Parc Jae-jung and NCT's Mark through a special Naver V app video on June 28, 2017. This resulted in a collaboration between the two artists, titled "Lemonade Love", which was eventually released on July 21 as a digital single through SM Entertainment's STATION season 2. Both Henry and Yoon Jong-shin eventually continued the project with the plan to rearrange their other label's composition into new digital singles, with Henry recruiting Red Velvet and Yoon Jong-shin recruiting PERC%NT, Jang Jane and Giant Pink for the project. Henry eventually rearranged "Rebirth" for the girl group, while Yoon Jong-shin chose the group's 2015 hit single "Dumb Dumb" to rework. The group's rendition was eventually released as a single through SM Station on August 18, 2017, coinciding with the release of Mystic's rendition to "Dumb Dumb".

== Music video ==
The music video depicts the members of Red Velvet play the roles of female students whose hearts start to race when their teachers enter the room.

A slow-motion video for the song was premiered on the same release day. Fellow labelmate Shindong from Super Junior took part in directing the music video, which depicts the members of Red Velvet play the roles of female students whose hearts start to race when their teachers enter the room.

== Track listing ==
Digital download / streaming
No.	Title	Lyrics	Music	Arrangement	Length
1.	"Rebirth"	Yoon Jong-shin, JQ	Yoon Jong-shin, Yoo Hee-yeol, Choi Jin-seok	Jin by Jin	3:33
2.	"Rebirth (Instrumental)"		Yoon Jong-shin, Yoo Hee-yeol, Choi Jin-seok	Jin by Jin	3:33
Total length:					7:06

== Credits and personnel ==
Credits adapted from Melon.

- Red Velvet (Irene, Seulgi, Wendy, Joy, Yeri) – vocals, background vocals
- Yoon Jong-shin – original writer, producer
- Yoo Hee-yeol – producer
- JQ – songwriter
- Jin by Jin – arrangement
- Choi Jin-seok – vocal director, producer
- Henry Lau - vocal director
- Jung Ho-jin (sound POOL studios) – record director
- Jang Woo-young (doobdoob Studio) – digital editor
- Jung Eui-suk (SM Blue Cup Studio) – mixing engineer
- Sung Ji-hoon (JFS Mastering) – mastering engineer

== Charts ==
=== Weekly chart ===
Weekly chart performance for "Rebirth"
Chart (2017)	Peak position
South Korea (Gaon)	78
US World Digital Songs (Billboard)	25

== Release history ==
Release dates and formats for "Rebirth"
Country	Date	Format(s)	Label
South Korea	August 18, 2017	Digital download; streaming	SM Entertainment
Various	August 18, 2017	Digital download; streaming	SM Entertainment
