= Red Flavor =

Song by Red Velvet

- Mar Vista remix cover

Single by Red Velvet

from the EP The Red Summer
- Language: Korean
- Released: July 9, 2017
- Studio: SM LVYIN Studio; SM Blue Cup Studio; Doobdoob Studio
- Genre: Tropical house; dance-pop; electropop
- Length: 3:11
- Label: SM; Genie
- Composers: Daniel Caesar; Ludwig Lindell
- Lyricists: Kenzie (Korean); Kami Kaoru (Japanese)

Red Velvet singles chronology
"Would U" (2017)	"Red Flavor" (2017)	"Rebirth" (2017)

Music video
- "Red Flavor" on YouTube

"Red Flavor" (Korean: 빨간 맛; RR: Ppalgan mat) is a song recorded by South Korean girl group Red Velvet for their first Korean special extended play, The Red Summer (2017). It was released as the lead single from the EP on July 9, 2017, through SM Entertainment and was distributed by Genie Music, along with the accompanying fruit-infused music video. Written by SM collaborator Kenzie and composed by Daniel Caesar and Ludwig Lindell (known collectively as Caesar & Loui), it is primarily a dance-pop song with synths and percussion. The song reflects the summer funky vibe, while the lyrics hint towards a young relationship with summer references. A Japanese version, adapted by songwriter Kami Kaoru, was later included on the group's first Japanese EP, #Cookie Jar, on July 4, 2018.

"Red Flavor" was well received by music critics; it appeared on several year-end lists and won Best Pop Song at the 15th Korean Music Awards. In 2019, Billboard ranked it as the 2nd greatest K-pop song of the 2010s, and in 2023, Rolling Stone placed it 19th on its list of the 100 greatest songs in the history of Korean pop music. Commercially, the song was a major success in South Korea, becoming Red Velvet's first number one on the Gaon Digital Chart, their longest-charting single to date, and their fifth song to surpass one million downloads. It also peaked at number four on the Billboard World Digital Songs chart in the United States and became the group's first single to enter the Billboard charts in Japan and the Philippines.

Since its release, Red Velvet has performed "Red Flavor" for all of their headlining concert tours. The song was performed at the Spring is Coming concert in Pyongyang at the East Pyongyang Grand Theatre (alongside "Bad Boy") to an audience that included Korean Workers' Party chairman Kim Jong-un. Seen as an act of a wider diplomatic initiative between South Korea and North Korea, the group's appearance at the concert made them only the fifth idol group to have performed in North Korea and the first artist from SM in 15 years, since boy group Shinhwa. The song has also been adapted into an orchestral version by Seoul Philharmonic Orchestra, featuring the arrangement of Park In-young.

== Background and release ==
After the release of their fourth extended play Rookie in February, Red Velvet released the digital single "Would U" as the first release for the second season of the label project SM Station in March 2017. It was the group's first single as a quartet in years due to member Joy's filming schedule for her first drama The Liar and His Lover (2017), in which she was starring as the female lead. Through Star-News and SM Entertainment's official press announcement on June 23, 2017, they were reported to have recently finished filming a music video. It eventually became Red Velvet's second comeback within a calendar year, which was later extended to a total of three times with the release of their second studio album Perfect Velvet in late November 2017. On June 30, the first batch of teaser photos were posted on the group's official social media accounts. The EP's title and its full tracklist, which included "Red Flavor", were revealed on the same day. The song had its official digital release on July 9, 2017, along with The Red Summer. The remix of "Red Flavor" by Mar Vista was released on August 31, 2023.

== Recording and composition ==
"Red Flavor"
"Red Flavor" is an electropop song with dramatic synths and a percussive melody. It also contains a low voice featured in the intro and chorus of the song.

"Red Flavor" was produced by Daniel Caesar and Ludwig Lindell (under the name of Caesar & Loui), who had previously worked with several South Korean artists in this name. In an interview with Tone Glow, the duo revealed that it had originally been written for the British girl group Little Mix with the title "Dance With Nobody". After deciding that the song could also work for the K-pop market, they recorded the demo with vocals by Ylva Dimberg whose voice is still heard in the background vocals in the pre-chorus. A low voice was featured in the intro and chorus of the song.

Musically, Tamar Herman of Billboard characterized "Red Flavor" as an electropop song with "dramatic synths and a percussive melody". It is composed in the key of A major, with a tempo of 125 beats per minute. Hwang Sun-eob of IZM noted the "sensuous composition of the bassline or synthesizer". In addition, Chase McMullen of The 405 noted that the song includes a "clap-along groove". Its Korean lyrics, which were written by long-time SM songwriter Kenzie, Caesar, and Lindell focuses on the theme of "fruit-flavored summer love". Initially released in Korean, a Japanese version of the song was performed at their first Japan showcase on November 6, 2017. The Japanese version of "Red Flavor" was then included on Red Velvet's first Japanese EP #Cookie Jar (2018), with the single of the same name. The Japanese version of the song was adapted by songwriter Kami Kaoru.

== Critical reception and recognition ==
Professional ratings
Review scores
Source	Rating
IZM	3.5/5 stars

Following its initial release, "Red Flavor" was met with positive reviews from music critics. Tamar Herman of Billboard magazine called the track "dynamic in its jam-packed, but not overpowering production" and concluded that it is "sure to be one of the summer's K-pop earworms". Jeff Benjamin of Fuse described the song as a "super-simple-to-swallow piece of pop", giving credit to the "cheery-chanty melody", which he pointed to as one of Red Velvet's more accessible tunes. McMullen complimented the song as an "effortless pop glide", while Lee Gi-seon of IZM magazine praised the song's unique production and the group's vocals. Chester Chin of The Star labelled the song an "in-your-face summer jam" and added that it was "relentlessly catchy". Taylor Glasby of Dazed commented that the song "shouldn't be seen as merely a quirky fix", stating: "It's complex and intimidating and that it feels so immediate and identifiable on the surface is just emblematic of its greatness." With the mighty punch of its chorus, she claimed the song "completely won the summer".

GQ Korea named "Red Flavor" its Song of the Year in the magazine's November 2017 issue. In December, IZM listed the song as one of its top 10 singles of the year. Dazed ranked the song at number two on its list of the 20 Best K-pop Songs of 2017. The song landed on Billboard's 20 Best K-Pop Songs 2017 list at number four, with Jeff Benjamin praising its uplifting, addictive, deliciously bubblegum melody. The magazine later featured "Red Flavor" in their decennial staff list of The 100 Greatest K-pop Songs of the 2010s at number two, calling it an "undeniable hit since day one and remains ever-beloved by fans worldwide". The song also landed on Melon's domestic Top 100 Songs of the 2010s list at number 29 (number 9 among K-pop idols). Billboard and NME ranked "Red Flavor" number 1 and 4 in their lists of best Red Velvet songs, respectively. Melon ranked it number 20 while Rolling Stone ranked it number 13 in their lists of the greatest K-pop songs of all time, with the latter publication praising its production and hailing it as the epitome of "summertime fun, adventure, and romance."

"Red Flavor" on select listicles
Publication	List	Rank	Ref.
Billboard	The Best K-pop Songs of 2017: Critics' Picks	4	
Billboard	The 100 Greatest K-pop Songs of the 2010s: Staff List	2	
The Daily Dot	The absolute best K-pop of 2017	Placed	
Dazed	The 20 best K-pop songs of 2017	2	
GQ Korea	2017 GQ Awards	Placed	
IZM	Top 10 Songs of 2017	Placed	
Melon	Top 100 K-pop Songs of All Time	20	
Music Y	Top 10 Songs of 2017	1	
Rolling Stone	100 Greatest Songs in the History of Korean Pop Music	13	
SBS PopAsia	Top 7 K-pop songs of 2017	Placed	
Weiv	The Best Tracks of 2017	Placed	

== Accolades ==
Following the group's initial South Korea music shows promotion, Red Velvet earned their first Show Champion trophy for "Red Flavor" on July 20, 2017, and continued to achieve a total of five trophies by the end of July 2017. It was nominated for the Song of the Year - July category at the 7th Gaon Chart Music Awards in 2018, but lost to labelmate Exo's "Ko Ko Bop". The song, however, won in the Best Digital Song category at the 32nd Golden Disc Awards, becoming the group's second time to win this category following "Ice Cream Cake" in 2016. "Red Flavor" also earned Red Velvet their first Korean Music Awards in their career in the Best Pop Song category. The song also received a nomination in the Song of the Year category at the 2017 Mnet Asian Music Awards, but lost to Twice's "Signal".

Awards and nominations for "Red Flavor"
Year	Organization	Award	Result	Ref.
2017	Melon Music Awards	Best Dance Award – Female	Nominated	
2017	Mnet Asian Music Awards	Best Dance Performance – Female Group	Nominated	
2017	Mnet Asian Music Awards	Song of the Year	Nominated	
2018	Golden Disc Awards	Digital Bonsang	Won	
2018	Golden Disc Awards	Digital Daesang	Nominated	
2018	Korean Music Awards	Best Pop Song	Won	
2018	Korean Music Awards	Song of the Year	Nominated	
2018	Gaon Chart Music Awards	Song of the Month – July 2017	Nominated	

Music program awards
Program	Date	Ref.
Show Champion	July 19, 2017	
M Countdown	July 20, 2017	
Music Bank	July 21, 2017	
Show! Music Core	July 22, 2017	
Inkigayo	July 23, 2017	

== Commercial performance ==
On the third week of July 2017, "Red Flavor" debuted atop the Gaon Digital Chart for one week, giving Red Velvet their first number one on the chart since their debut in August 2014. It was also the group's best selling record in the first week, with 291,643 downloads. Following its appearance at number 20 on 2017's Gaon Year-End Digital Chart, "Red Flavor" became Red Velvet's longest-charting entry to date, having spent a total of 64 consecutive weeks within the top 100 of the Digital Chart, while re-appearing for 16 weeks on the lower half of the new top 200 as of September 2019. The song also debuted at number two on the Billboard K-pop Hot 100, making it their first top-five entry. As of September 2018, the song has sold over 2,500,000 downloads in South Korea, making it the group's fifth million-seller and currently their best selling single. Gaon also reported that the song has accumulated over 100 million streams, making it Red Velvet's second song to reach the milestone, following "Russian Roulette" (2016). The former appeared again as the 58th biggest hit single on 2018's Gaon Year-End Digital Chart, which saw the most year-end entries from the group with a total of four releases, including "Bad Boy" at number 26.

Elsewhere, the song debuted at number four on the US Billboard World Digital Song Sales chart, making it Red Velvet's third song to debut and peak at the same position following "Happiness" (2014) and "Rookie" (2017). The Korean version also debuted at number 24 and 25 on the Billboard Philippine Hot 100 and Billboard Japan Hot 100 respectively, marking the group's first entry and their highest peak to date on the Japanese chart.

== Music video ==
=== Background ===
The music video is set in a fruit-infused theme, depicting of people falling in love, highlighted by a reminiscent cheerleading choreography.

On July 7, 2017, a 19-second video teaser for "Red Flavor" was uploaded on the official SM Town channel, with the official video being released two days later. The visual was released on SM Entertainment's official YouTube channel on July 9, 2017, to coincide with the digital release of The Red Summer. Choreographed by Kyle Hanagami who had previously worked with the group for their singles "Be Natural" (2014), "Ice Cream Cake" (2015) and "Russian Roulette" (2016), the song's music video was directed by director Seong Chang-won. Joy recalled running into SM Entertainment founder Lee Soo-man at an SM Town dinner, who disclosed to her that he had been heavily involved in overseeing a lot for the song, including its lyrics, melody, rhythm, and even the choreography.

=== Synopsis and reception ===
The fruit-infused music video has a colorful summer theme that features all five members singing about love in the summer. It shows various scenes in where Red Velvet can be seen interviewing fruits, and appears on a small screen, expressing something with their hands, which turned out to be a sign language. It depicts people falling in love with colorful and intense colors, fruits and drinks over the lively pop beats. The song was highlighted by its colorful movements reminiscent of cheerleading. Following the music video's release, writer Tamar Herman of Billboard described it as "evoking the tastes of fresh fruit, candy, ice cream and cocktails" further praising the video for its "vibrant seasonal romance" picture. The music video was included in Idology's 2017 Best Music Videos. The music video was also one of YouTube Korea's Top 10 Most Popular Music Videos of 2017. On September 10, 2018, the music video for the track reached 100 million views on YouTube.

== Live performances ==
A day before its digital release, "Red Flavor" was performed live by Red Velvet for the first time at an SMTOWN concert in Seoul. Hours after the release on July 9, 2017, the group had their first music show performance on Inkigayo, where they also performed "You Better Know". They continued appearing on several music shows such as The Show, M Countdown, Music Bank, and Show Champion where they earned their first music show trophy for "Red Flavor" on July 20, 2017. The song was also part of Red Velvet's first solo concert tour Red Room in August 2017. It is the first Red Velvet song to be recorded and performed in Japanese, serving as their debut performance during a showcase in Japan on November 6, 2017, and later being performed during the Japanese leg of the annual SMTOWN Live World Tour. During the group's attendance at 2017 Mnet Asian Music Awards, they performed the Hitchhiker remix version of the song along with their November single "Peek-a-Boo". The second remix contained an anthemic EDM-breakdown after the final chorus.

As part of the group's attendance and performance at the Spring is Coming concert, which was intended as part of a wider diplomatic initiative between South Korea and North Korea, Red Velvet performed the song along with "Bad Boy" in Pyongyang at the East Pyongyang Grand Theatre to an audience that saw the appearance of Korean Workers' Party chairman Kim Jong-un. This made them only the fifth idol group to ever perform in North Korea and the first artist from SM Entertainment in 15 years since the performance of former labelmate Shinhwa.

== Credits and personnel ==
Credits adapted from the liner notes of The Red Summer and #Cookie Jar.

Studio

- Recorded and edited at SM LVYIN Studio
- Recorded at doobdoob Studio
- Recorded, edited, and mixed at SM Blue Cup Studio
- Mastered at Sterling Sound

Personnel

- Red Velvet (Irene, Seulgi, Wendy, Joy, Yeri) – vocals, background vocals
- Kenzie – Korean lyrics, vocal directing
- Kami Kaoru – Japanese lyrics
- Daniel Caesar – composition, arrangement
- Ludwig Lindell – composition, arrangement
- Ylva Dimberg – background vocals
- Lee Ji-hong – recording, digital editing
- Ahn Chang-kyu – recording
- Jung Eui-seok – recording, digital editing, mixing
- Chris Gehringer – mastering

== Charts ==
=== Weekly charts ===
Weekly chart performance
Chart (2017)	Peak position
Japan (Japan Hot 100)	25
Philippines (Philippine Hot 100)	24
South Korea (Gaon)	1
South Korea (K-pop Hot 100)	2
US World Digital Songs (Billboard)	4

=== Monthly charts ===
Monthly chart performance
Chart (2017)	Position
South Korea (Gaon)	2

=== Year-end charts ===
2017 year-end charts
Chart (2017)	Position
South Korea (Gaon)	20

2018 year-end charts
Chart (2018)	Position
South Korea (Gaon)	58

== Release history ==
Release dates and formats
Region	Date	Format(s)	Version	Label(s)	Ref.
Various	July 9, 2017	Digital download; streaming	Korean	SM; Genie	
Various	July 4, 2018	Digital download; streaming	Japanese	SM; Avex	
Various	August 31, 2023	Digital download; streaming	Mar Vista remix	SM; ScreaM	

== Orchestra version ==
"Red Flavor (Orchestra Version)"

Single by Seoul Philharmonic Orchestra and Park In-young
- Released: July 17, 2020
- Genre: Orchestra
- Length: 3:21
- Label: SM; Dreamus
- Songwriters: Daniel Caesar; Ludwig Lindell
- Producer: Lee Soo-man

Music video
- "Red Flavor (Orchestra Version)" on YouTube

"Red Flavor (Orchestra Version)" is an orchestral song recorded by South Korean orchestra Seoul Philharmonic Orchestra, re-established with the arrangement of Park In-young. SM Entertainment made its first collaboration with the orchestra forming a new classical label, SM Classics, creating an orchestral version of "Red Flavor". The music video for the "Red Flavor" orchestra features a 44-piece orchestra performing "Red Flavor" under the direction of David Lee.

=== Track listing ===
- Digital download / streaming
1. "Red Flavor (Orchestra Version)" – 3:21

=== Credits and personnel ===
Credits adapted from Melon and Tidal.

Studio

- Recorded at Seoul Philharmonic Orchestra Rehearsal Room
- Recorded at Brickwall Sound
- Mixed at SM Concert Hall Studio
- Mastered at 821 Sound

Personnel

- Yoo Young-jin – music and sound supervisor
- Park In-young – recording director, background instrument
- David Lee – conductor
- Seoul Philharmonic Orchestra – performer
- Moon Jung-jae – piano
- Hwang Hyun – background instrument
- Lee Jong-han – background instrument
- Monkey Media Group – recording
- Kang Hyo-min – recording
- Moon Il-oh – recording assistant
- Nam Koong-jin – mixing
- Kwon Nam-woo – mastering

=== Release history ===
Release dates and formats
Region	Date	Format(s)	Label(s)	Ref.
Various	July 17, 2020	Digital download; streaming	SM; Dreamus	

== See also ==
- List of Gaon Digital Chart number ones of 2017
- List of M Countdown Chart winners (2017)
- List of Inkigayo Chart winners (2017)
