= Bad Boy (Red Velvet song) =

- Remixes cover

Single by Red Velvet

from the album The Perfect Red Velvet
- Released: January 29, 2018
- Recorded: 2017–2018
- Studio: SM LYVIN (Seoul)
- Genre: R&B
- Length: 3:31
- Label: SM; Dreamus
- Composers: The Stereotypes; Maxx Song; Whitney Phillips; Yoo Young-jin
- Lyricists: JQ (Note: Korean version only); Moon Hee-yeon; Whitney Phillips (Note: English version only)
- Producer: The Stereotypes

Red Velvet singles chronology
"Peek-A-Boo" (2017)	"Bad Boy" (2018)	"#CookieJar" (2018)

Music video
- "Bad Boy" on YouTube

"Bad Boy" is a song by South Korean girl group Red Velvet from the reissue of their second studio album, The Perfect Red Velvet (2018). It was released by SM Entertainment on January 29, 2018. A hip hop-influenced R&B song, its lyrics were written by JQ and Moon Hee-yeon whilst music was handled by the Stereotypes, Maxx Song, Whitney Phillips and Yoo Young-jin. An English version, adapted by Phillips, was later included as a bonus track on the group's second special EP, Summer Magic on August 6, 2018.

"Bad Boy" was well received by music critics, who praised its production and the group's "lush contemporary R&B-meets-pop" sound. It was included in Billboard's list of 100 Best Songs of 2018 in addition to topping their ranking of 20 Best K-pop Songs of the year. A commercial success, it became the group's fourth top-two entry on the Gaon Digital Chart and was certified platinum by the Korea Music Content Association (KMCA) for digital sales of over 2,500,000 units. Elsewhere, it peaked at number two on the World Digital Songs chart and number 87 on the Canadian Hot 100.

The song was one of two performed by Red Velvet at the Spring Is Coming concert held at the East Pyongyang Grand Theatre in Pyongyang, to an audience that included Kim Jong Un. The concert was widely viewed as an act of cultural diplomacy and formed part of a broader diplomatic initiative between South Korea and North Korea. Red Velvet's appearance made them the fifth idol group to ever perform in North Korea and the first artist from SM in fifteen years since Shinhwa.

== Background and release ==
During an interview with Idolator on January 16, 2018, production team The Stereotypes revealed that they have worked with the girl group for a "really cool" upcoming work. A week after, SM Entertainment announced through an image teaser posted on their official social media accounts on January 23, 2018, that Red Velvet would release The Perfect Red Velvet, the reissue title to their previous full-length release. The label further revealed that the re-release would include three additional new songs, including the lead single "Bad Boy", which was described as a song with a "sexy" or "girl crush" concept by South Korean news sites, which the group has never done before. Since January 26, teaser images of all members were eventually revealed through the group's social media platforms, with journalist Kang Seo-jung of Osen commented had the vibe of a powerful "eonni". Kang also noted how the song's concept differs from the group's past releases. Following the video teaser released on January 24, the song was released on January 29, 2018, along with its parental reissue and the accompanying music video.

== Composition ==
"Bad Boy"
"Bad Boy" is a '90s-inspired R&B song with elements of hip hop and trap.

Produced by the Stereotypes, Maxx Song, Whitney Phillips, and Yoo Young-jin, "Bad Boy" is described as a hip hop-based R&B song with a synth melody and a heavy bass sound. Following the verse-chorus song structure, the song was composed in the key of D major with a tempo of 150 beats-per-minute, which labeled the song as Red Velvet's fifth single to follow the "Velvet" concept. During a Deconstructed episode with Genius, the team revealed that they "went back" to '90s R&B music for the musical inspiration, further citing the group's native label "allowing" the team to incorporate their musical influence. Running a total length of three minutes and thirty-one seconds, the song starts with a melody line built by Sylenth1, followed by an "unexpected" percussion line by producer Ray Romulus, a beat loop by producer Jonathan Yip in the first half of the verse. Producer Jeremy Reeves then added the main bassline, built in Trilian, in the latter half of the verse section, before producer Ray Charles added in a pad line in the pre-chorus section, citing the addition to "outline" the chords and to "keep the energy up". Following the chorus section, the second verse kicks in with an additional snap line in the first half, while Romulus added an octave to the piano chords on the second chorus. The bridge section was then composed in half-time, with the snare loop being "chopped" and the producers changing the synth choice and its progression. According to producer Yip, the bridge section was "meant to take [listeners] away from the rest of the feelings of the song", wanting to create an unexpected shift for listeners. The song then returns to its chorus section for the last time, including additional sounds such as walking in heels, riding motors and cars' siren before ending. With Korean lyrics adapted by lyricists JQ and Moon Hee-yeon, "Bad Boy" details the attraction and emotions between a 'bad boy' and a cold woman. Mexican news site Milenio called the song's melody a mix of R&B and hip hop and stated that its lyrics tell the story of the beginning of the couple's relationship. An English version of the song was later released as a bonus track for their next release on August 6, 2018, titled Summer Magic. The English version of the song was adapted by Whitney Phillips.

== Critical reception ==
Tamar Herman of Billboard labelled the song their "darkest yet", noting the difference between the rainbow hues of their last single "Peek-a-Boo" and stated that the members "played up their smoother retro leanings" with the addition of the new songs in its parent album The Perfect Red Velvet. Herman also commented on the song's choreography, which was seen as the sexiest the group has ever done. She then called the song and the album "overall representatives" of the group's "velvet" side (a reference to the group's dual concept), which contrasted the quirkier "red" songs that the group has released in the previous year. Avery Thompson of Hollywood Life stated that the song was "music perfection" and called the members "the epitome of girl power" in the music video. She also praised its choreography and the group's vocals. Fuse's Jeff Benjamin felt that the group put their own spin on modern R&B and hip hop and compared it to other artists such as Rihanna, Tinashe, and Cardi B who have incorporated "sassy, catch phrases into their verses and choruses". Forbes opined that The Stereotypes' work on the album "have helped hone the girl group's lush contemporary R&B-meets-pop sound".

In the group's native country South Korea, X Sports News described "Bad Boy" as the perfect blend of the group's intense "red" side and soft "velvet" in their review of Red Velvet's dual concept "red" and velvet" since Red Velvet's debut with "Happiness" and "Be Natural" in 2014.

In December 2018, Billboard included "Bad Boy" in their '100 Best Songs of 2018: Critics' Picks' list while the song topped their annual '20 Best K-pop Songs of 2018: Critics' Picks' list, making Red Velvet the first female artist to top the list since it started in 2012. In the article, Billboard called it "the group's and one of the year's most pristine production to date". Dazed also included the song in their '20 best K-pop songs of 2018' and called the song "understated but bold, a buttery, mid-tempo R&B track that puts the focus on the quintet's voices" they then concluded that "Red Velvet are already K-pop's most musically interesting girl group" and the song "solidifies them as one of the best in the game overall". The song was also featured in Paper's 'Top 20 K-Pop Songs of 2018' at number two, stating that "In a year marked by terrible men (still) hogging way too many of the headlines, a girl group flipping the script and delivering an ode to stringing along a 'Bad Boy' makes it all the more perfect as one of the year's best releases".

In 2019, Billboard once again featured "Bad Boy" in their decennial 'The 100 Greatest K-Pop Songs of the 2010s: Staff List', placing 27th. Writing in the article, L. Singh called "Bad Boy" the "perfect representation of their mature 'velvet' persona", and further praised its composition, commenting on "how tactile the sonic and visual layering of the song is".

Listings
Publication	List	Rank	Ref.
Billboard	Billboard's 100 Best Songs of 2018: Critics' Picks	43	
Billboard	The 20 Best K-pop Songs of 2018: Critics' Picks	1	
Billboard	The 100 Greatest K-Pop Songs of the 2010s	27	
Dazed	The 20 best K-pop songs of 2018	4	
Idology Korea	Best Songs of 2018	4	
Paper	Paper's Top 20 K-Pop Songs of 2018	2	
SBS PopAsia	PopAsia's Top 100 Asian pop songs of 2018: 50-1	4	

== Commercial performance ==
In South Korea, "Bad Boy" debuted and peaked at number two on the Gaon Digital Chart for two consecutive weeks. The song was Red Velvet's ninth top-ten, and subsequently their fourth number two entry on the chart. "Bad Boy" became the group's third number two entry on the Billboard K-Pop Hot 100. The song finished as the second best-performing song on the February issue of the monthly Gaon Digital Chart, and eventually as the twenty-sixth best-performing song on the 2018's Year-end Gaon Digital Chart. In April 2020, "Bad Boy" was certified Platinum by the Korea Music Content Association (KMCA) for selling over 2,500,000 downloads, marking Red Velvet's third song to reach the milestone, following "Red Flavor" and "Russian Roulette", but the group's first to receive a KMCA certificate following the introduction of certificate system in 2018.

The song also attained success for Red Velvet in North America, where it peaked at number two on Billboard's World Digital Songs chart, earning them their best sales week in the States to date, selling 4,000 downloads from January 26 to February 1. The song eventually became the group's best selling song in the US as of January 2020, having sold a total of 27,000 copies. Furthermore, "Bad Boy" was the group's first entry on the Canadian Hot 100, entering at number eighty-seven for one week, thus becoming the third female act, and subsequently the seventh overall K-pop artist to appear on the chart. The song was Red Velvet's third single to chart on the Japan Hot 100, peaking at number forty-nine for one week.

== Music video ==
An accompanying music video directed by Kim Ja-kyoung of Flexible Pictures and choreographed by Japanese hip hop dancer and choreographer Rie Hata, who had previously worked with CL for the choreography of "The Baddest Female" and with the group's label mate BoA for her single "Nega Dola", was released on the same day as the album and song. The video was called 'sultry' by Annie Martin of UPI and it featured the members in various coordinating outfits, which included all-black ensembles and pink pajamas. They were also seen in sexy uniforms, with athleisure fishnet-and-leather outfits. Tamar Herman of Billboard stated that it depicted the group as "femme fatales aiming to destroy the titular 'Bad Boy'". She also noted how it wasn't "particularly plot-oriented" but "the dangerous vibes of Irene, Seulgi, Wendy and Joy contrast with the more youthful, unicorn-riding image of youngest-member Yeri, who the others seemingly protect, with Seulgi even covering her ears during one scene". Talking about the choreography, she said that it was "filled with suggestive hip rolls and aggressive come-hither hand motions, beckoning sultrily toward the audience and shooting at the camera".

== Live performances ==
On April 1, 2018, Red Velvet performed the song along with "Red Flavor" in Pyongyang at the East Pyongyang Grand Theatre to an audience that included Kim Jong-un during a concert billed as "Spring is Coming", intended as part of a wider diplomatic initiative between South Korea and North Korea. This made them only the fifth idol group to ever perform in North Korea and the first artist from SM Entertainment in fifteen years since Shinhwa. The group also performed a half-Korean, half-English version of the song at a fan meeting in Chicago in April 2018, months before the release of its official English version in August.

== Accolades ==
Awards and nominations for "Bad Boy"
Year	Organization	Award	Result	Ref.
2018	Melon Music Awards	Song of the Year	Longlisted	
2018	Mnet Asian Music Awards	Song of the Year	Longlisted	
2018	Mnet Asian Music Awards	Best Dance Performance – Female Group	Nominated	
2019	Gaon Chart Music Awards	Song of the Year – January	Nominated	
2019	Golden Disc Awards	Digital Song Bonsang	Nominated	
2019	Korean Music Awards	Best Pop Song	Nominated	

Music program awards
Program	Date	Ref.
Show Champion	February 7, 2018	
M Countdown	February 8, 2018	
M Countdown	February 15, 2018	
Music Bank	February 9, 2018	
Inkigayo	February 11, 2018	

Melon popularity award
Award	Date	Ref.
Weekly Popularity Award	March 12, 2018	

== Track listing ==
- Digital download / streaming – Korean version
1. "Bad Boy" – 3:30
- Digital download / streaming – Remixes
1. "Bad Boy (PREP remix)" – 3:41
2. "Bad Boy (Nomad remix)" – 3:31
3. "Bad Boy (Slom remix)" – 3:34

== Credits ==
Credits adapted from The Perfect Red Velvet and Summer Magic liner notes

- SM Entertainment – executive producer
- Lee Soo-man – producer
- Maxx Song – composition, background vocals, vocal directing, digital editing, Pro Tools operating
- Jang Woo-young (Doobdoob Studio) – digital editing
- Gu Jong-pil (S.M. Yellow Tail Studio) – mixing engineer
- Randy Merrill (Sterling Sound) – mastering engineer
- Lee Ji-hong (S.M. Lvyin Studio) – recording engineer
- JQ – Korean lyrics
- Moon Hee-yeon – Korean lyrics
- Yoo Young-jin – composition
- The Stereotypes – producer, composition, arrangement
- TK – arrangement
- Whitney Phillips – composition, background vocals, English lyrics
- Red Velvet – vocals, background vocals

== Charts ==
=== Weekly charts ===
Weekly chart performance
Chart (2018)	Peak position
Canada (Canadian Hot 100)	87
Japan (Japan Hot 100)	49
Malaysia (RIM)	18
Singapore (RIAS)	8
South Korea (Gaon)	2
South Korea (K-pop Hot 100)	2
US World Digital Songs (Billboard)	2

=== Year-end charts ===
2018 year-end charts
Chart (2018)	Position
South Korea (Gaon)	26
US World Digital Songs (Billboard)	22

== Certifications ==
Region	Certification	Certified units/sales
New Zealand (RMNZ)	Gold	15,000^{‡}
South Korea (KMCA)	Platinum	2,500,000^{*}
^{*} Sales figures based on certification alone.^{‡} Sales+streaming figures based on certification alone.

== Release history ==
Release dates and formats
Region	Date	Format(s)	Version	Label(s)	Ref.
Various	January 29, 2018	Digital download; streaming	Korean	SM Entertainment; IRIVER	
Various	November 1, 2021	Digital download; streaming	Remixes	SM Entertainment; Dreamus	

== See also ==
- List of M Countdown Chart winners (2018)
- List of Music Bank Chart winners (2018)
- List of Inkigayo Chart winners (2018)
- List of certified songs in South Korea
