= Haps Magazine =

South Korean English-language magazine

- Founded: June 2009
- Country: South Korea
- Based in: Busan
- Language: English and Korean
- Website: www.hapskorea.com

Haps Magazine, also known as "HAPS", is an English online magazine located in Busan, South Korea that focuses on lifestyle, entertainment and expat life on the Korean Peninsula. It was founded in 2009 and has become one of Korea's most popular English resources for news and information.

While the focus of the magazine is mostly on events and happenings around the Busan and southeastern areas of Korea, the magazine has claimed some international fame for some of its articles. Editor-in-Chief Bobby McGill's report on K-pop singer Psy 's past anti-American actions saw numerous international media outlets including TIME, The Washington Post and the New York Post help break the story which made the "Gangnam Style" legend apologize for his actions.

HAPS also received more international attention when a report about South Korean baseball player Kim Tae-kyun made insensitive remarks towards African-American pitcher Shane Youman. The report helped contribute to the National Human Rights Commission of Korea demanding sensitivity training education to prevent similar racial discrimination remarks among sports professionals in Korea.

== History ==
HAPS was established in June 2009 in the Haeundae District in Busan. The print publication ceased to exist in November, 2016 and now focuses only on online content, including adding a Korean language section.

The site changed from busanhaps.com to its new domain at hapskorea.com in May, 2017.

== Awards ==
HAPS was voted the "Best City Magazine" in Korea at the 2014 K-blog awards held by the Korean Observer.
