= Peek-a-Boo (Red Velvet song) =

2017 single by Red Velvet

Single by Red Velvet

from the album Perfect Velvet
- Released: November 17, 2017
- Recorded: 2017
- Studio: SM Studios, Seoul
- Genre: Dance-pop; tropical house
- Length: 3:09
- Label: SM; Genie Music
- Composers: Moonshine; Cazzi Opeia; Ellen Berg Tollbom
- Lyricist: Kenzie
- Producer: Moonshine

Red Velvet singles chronology
"Rebirth" (2017)	"Peek-a-Boo" (2017)	"Bad Boy" (2018)

Music video
- "Peek-a-Boo" on YouTube

"Peek-a-Boo" (Korean: 피카부; RR: Pikabu) is a song recorded by South Korean girl group Red Velvet for their second studio album, Perfect Velvet (2017). An up-tempo dance-pop track with tropical house elements, it was written by Kenzie, Ellen Berg Tollbom, Cazzi Opeia, and duo Moonshine, while production was handled by the latter contributor. The song was released in conjunction with its parental album on November 17, 2017, through SM Entertainment. It was later re-recorded in Japanese for the group's second Japanese extended play Sappy, which was released on May 29, 2019.

"Peek-a-Boo" received generally positive reviews from critics, who noted the group's transition from a brighter and bubblier image from their last two singles "Rookie" and "Red Flavor" to a more mature sound. To promote the single, Red Velvet held a comeback showcase on the day of its release and promoted the song on several music programs in South Korea. The group additionally performed it on several year-end music award ceremonies, along with "Red Flavor".

== Background ==
After finishing initial promotion for The Red Summer and wrapping up their first concert Red Room in August 2017, various South Korean news sites reported that Red Velvet is planning for their third comeback within the year on October 30. The announcement was then confirmed later that day by their home label S.M. Entertainment.

S.M. Entertainment revealed the title of the group's new single through a teaser along with the title of their second full album, Perfect Velvet at midnight on November 8. Referencing the "velvet" half of the group's dual concept that affects the group's music and their image where their "red" side is brighter and livelier, producing upbeat songs such as their last single "Red Flavor" while their softer and more sophisticated "velvet" image spawned tracks predominantly of the R&B and ballad genre, S.M. Entertainment stated in an interview with X Sports News on November 8 that they intended to show "an upgraded version" of the group's "velvet" concept. The single is described as one of the group's "velvet" tracks but with hints of their "red" side which their company felt is the perfect formula for the concept.

== Composition ==
"Peek-a-Boo"
"Peek-a-Boo" is a dance pop song with trop house elements.

"Peek-a-Boo" was composed by Moonshine (Ludvig Evers & Jonatan Gusmark), Ellen Berg Tollbom and Swedish artist Cazzi Opeia, who revealed earlier in June 2017 that she had written a song for the group.

Musically, "Peek-a-Boo" was described as an up-tempo pop dance song with addictive hooks. Meanwhile, Tamar Herman of Billboard stated that it is "laden with trop house elements underneath the overarching quirky pop vibe, and is driven by a deep bass drumline, scratchy synths, and metallic beats" which also features "a variety of diverse, playful instrumental elements nestled beneath the main melody". The song is considered as their fourth single under their "Velvet" persona, and was composed in the key of C♯ minor, with a tempo of 115 beat-per-minute. To match the mysterious vibe of the music video, member Joy recorded her own laughter multiple times for a segment in the track but ultimately, the voice taken from the original demo was featured instead. Its lyrics, which were written by SM Entertainment songwriter Kenzie, compares a newfound romantic relationship to a mischievous game children play.

== Promotion ==
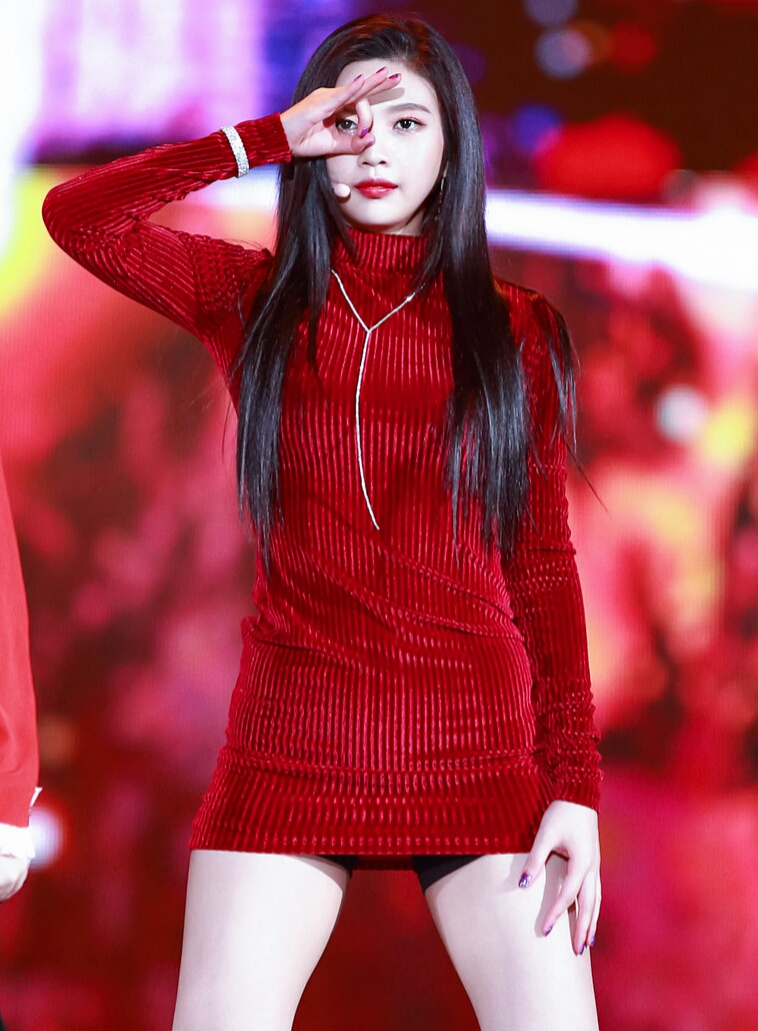
Joy and the other Red Velvet members performed the song at the Melon Music Awards on December 2, 2017.

A music video for the song was released the same day as the single and album. It was directed by Kim Ji-yong and was filmed in the 100-year-old Boyle-Barmore house in Los Angeles. Kyle Hanagami once again choreographed for the group, his fifth time working with them after "Be Natural" (2014), "Ice Cream Cake" (2015), "Russian Roulette" (2016) and their last single, "Red Flavor", which was released only months prior. Its dance features a peeping hand movement similar to the "OK" hand sign emoji.

In what Billboard describes as "seductively murderous", the music video had a darker theme than any of their previous songs. With a plot similar to b-grade horror films, it starts off with all five girls in rainbow dresses staring ominously at a full moon on the porch of an old house. In various scenes, the members are shown with various kinds of weaponry, including an axe and crossbow, while also enacting mysterious rituals. A pizza delivery boy is lured inside and tricked into playing with them, eating (for example) green jello off a plate while blindfolded, but after making a show of helping him escape the danger he realizes he is in, the five women hunt him down and the video ends with his uniform on display in a glass case that was last seen empty in the girls' house. Before he dies he tries to use the telephone, which has a poster saying 'MISSING DELIVERY BOYS' on it. The music video reflects the image change the group underwent from "Red Flavor". Lai Frances of PopCrush stated that "the K-pop quintet ditched the saturated sets for darker schemes while channeling their inner Wednesday Addams". Similarly, The Michigan Journal felt that it gave off sinister cult vibes and compared it to "a creepy 1930's Hollywood horror film". The group's main vocalist Wendy admitted that she struggled to get into character as a "femme fatale" but fellow member Seulgi claimed that she liked the darker pop sound and eerie music video. She also added that "people will be more curious about it because it's mysterious and charming all at the same time".

To promote the song and album, Red Velvet held a showcase on November 16, where they performed "Peek-A-Boo" for the first time. The group also appeared on a number of music shows in South Korea and had their comeback stage on Music Bank on November 17, an hour before the album's release along with the music video. The song was also performed on several South Korean year-end music awards, along with the group's previous singles in 2017.

== Critical reception ==
"Peek-a-Boo" received generally positive reviews from music critics. Coming from a brighter image which reflects the "red" half of the group's concept, where their previous single "Red Flavor" falls under, the group revisiting their softer and more mature "velvet" side was considered a bold and dangerous move, considering the success of "Red Flavor". Seon Mi-kyung of Osen believed that it is noteworthy the group chose to change their identity and color to show their growth as artists. Kookmin Ilbo praised all the songs in the album, calling them "colorful and solid" and characterized the single as "a combination of grooves by heavy drum beats and dark yet lively melodies". While talking about how the quality of music has increased dramatically over the past decade, they commented that Red Velvet's music is like a signal that now, people "can do this kind of music". Kim Sang-hwa of Oh My Star compared the transition from their "red"-dominant songs to "Peek-A-Boo" to "a rugby ball that you are unsure of where it would go", but called their musical experimentation and "future-oriented sound" their strongest ever and hailed the album as one of the most outstanding domestic music records released in the year.

Tamar Herman of Billboard described the lead single as "a stylistic follow-up" to their 2015 song "Ice Cream Cake" which according to her had the same "haunting, chromatic melody and taunting choral hook". Referencing the song's music video, Aubree Stamper of The Michigan Journal stated that "the song itself and its addicting beat will lure you in just like the poor pizza boy" and gave emphasis to its playful lyrics in the chorus. Chase McMullen of The 405 compared the group to other popular girl groups who are limited to either "cute" or "sexy" concepts and lauded them for "simply refusing to be pegged down" and "making a point of valuing their versatility", giving their last two singles as an example of their diverse music.

== Commercial performance ==
"Peek-a-Boo" debuted at number 12 on the South Korean Gaon Digital Chart in the 46th week of 2017. The song quickly rose to number 2 on the chart a week later. It became their third single to enter the top five on the Gaon Digital Chart within the year, and their eighth overall top-ten hit. It then charted at number 9 on the monthly Gaon Digital Chart in November. In addition, the song debuted at number 3 on the re-established Billboard K-Pop Hot 100 for the week of November 27, 2017. It then rose to number 2 the following week, becoming the highest peak for the song on the chart, tying with their previous release "Red Flavor".

Elsewhere, the song charted at number two on the US Billboard World Digital Songs chart, which ties with their previous record on the chart with their 2016 single "Russian Roulette". In Japan and Philippines, the song debuted at number 36 and 62 on the Billboard Japan Hot 100 and Philippine Hot 100 respectively, making it their second single to enter the chart in 2017.

== Accolades ==
Awards and nominations
Year	Organization	Award	Result	Ref.
2018	Gaon Chart Music Awards	Song of the Year – November	Nominated	

Music program awards
Program	Date	Ref.
Inkigayo (SBS)	December 10, 2017	
Inkigayo (SBS)	January 14, 2018	

== Personnel ==
Credits adapted from Perfect Velvet liner notes

- SM Entertainment – executive producer
- Lee Soo-man – producer
- Yoo Young-jin – music and sound supervisor
- Kenzie – lyrics, vocal directing
- Lee Joo-hyung – vocal directing, Pro Tools operating
- Lee Ji-hong (S.M. LYVIN Studio) – recording engineer
- Lee Min-gyu (S.M. Big Shot Studio) – recording engineer, digital editing
- Jung Eui-seok (S.M. Blue Cup Studio) – mixing engineer
- Moonshine (Ludvig Evers & Jonatan Gusmark) – producer, composition, arrangement
- Ellen Berg Tollbom – composition, arrangement
- Cazzi Opeia – composition, arrangement, background vocals
- Red Velvet – vocals, background vocals
- Shin Agnes – background vocals
- Chris Gehringer (Sterling Sound) – mastering engineer

== Charts ==
=== Weekly charts ===
Weekly chart performance for "Peek-a-Boo"
Chart (2017)	Peak position
Japan (Japan Hot 100)	36
Philippines (Philippine Hot 100)	62
South Korea (Gaon Digital Chart)	2
South Korea (K-pop Hot 100)	2
US World Digital Song (Billboard)	2

=== Monthly charts ===
Monthly chart performance for "Peek-a-Boo"
Chart (2017)	Peak position
South Korea (Gaon Digital Chart)	7

== Release history ==
Region	Date	Format	Label
South Korea	November 17, 2017	Digital download; streaming	SM Entertainment; Genie Music
Various	November 17, 2017	Digital download; streaming	SM Entertainment

== See also ==
- List of Inkigayo Chart winners (2017)
- List of Inkigayo Chart winners (2018)
