= Spring Is Coming =

2018 concert in Pyongyang

- Cultural diplomacy concert by Choi Jung-in, Cho Yong-pil, Lee Sun-hee, Yoon Do-hyun, Baek Ji-young, Choi Jin-hee, Kang San-ae, Seohyun, Kim Kwang-min, YB, Red Velvet, Samjiyon Orchestra
- Location: Pyongyang, North Korea
- Venue: East Pyongyang Grand Theatre, Ryugyong Chung Ju-yung Gymnasium
- Dates: April 1 and 3, 2018
- No. of shows: Two
- Guests: Kim Jong-un, Ri Sol-ju
- Supporting act: South Korean taekwondo artists

Spring Is Coming (Korean: 봄이 온다; RR: Bomi Onda; MR: Pomi Onta) was a concert that occurred in Pyongyang, North Korea, on April 1 and 3, 2018. It included numerous South Korean performers, and was described as an important event in the 2018 thaw in the North Korea–South Korea relations.

== Background ==
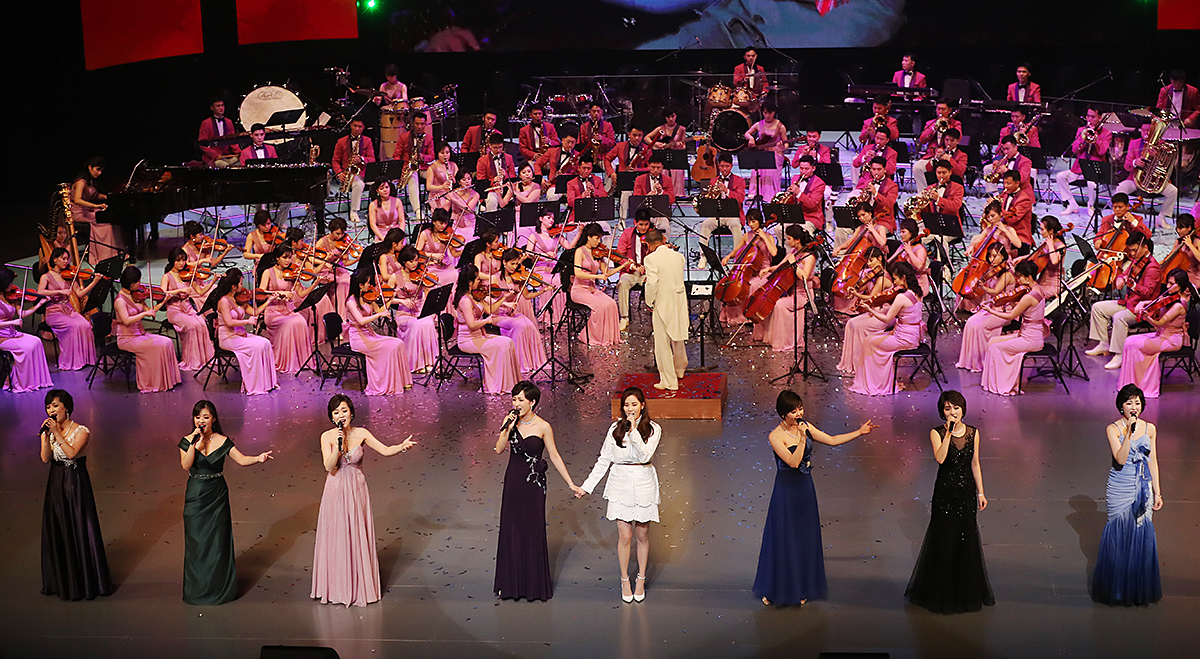
North Korea's musical ensemble Samjiyon Orchestra had its second performance in Seoul, South Korea on February 11, 2018. On this night, K-pop girl group Girls' Generation member Seohyun surprised the audience by making an appearance on the stage.

The event has been described as the first South Korean musical performance in the North in "over a decade". The previous South Korean performance in the North took place in 2005, with a solo concert by Cho Yong-pil. The Spring Is Coming concert was described as a "reciprocal cultural visit" after North Korea sent performers to the South. In particular, North Korea's Samjiyon Orchestra gave several concerts coinciding with the 2018 Winter Olympics, including a concert in Seoul on February 11, attended by North Korean leader's sister and, at the time, Deputy Director of the Propaganda and Agitation Department Kim Yo-jong and South Korean President Moon Jae-in.

== The concert ==
The Spring Is Coming concert took part over two days: April 1 (Sunday) and April 3 (Tuesday). The first day featured a 2 hour long concert at the East Pyongyang Grand Theatre which seats 1,500. Performers included at least 11 South Korean singers and vocalists, including Jung-In, Ali, Cho Yong-pil, Lee Sun-hee, Yoon Do-hyun, Baek Ji-young, Kang San-ae, Seohyun, pianist Kim Kwang-min, five-member rock band YB, as well as five-member K-pop girl band Red Velvet (though one of Red Velvet band members, Joy, did not attend due to scheduling conflicts). The second day featured a joint performance between South and North Korean musicians at the Ryugyong Chung Ju-yung Gymnasium (12,000 seats), with the North side represented by the Samjiyon Orchestra. Approximately 190 South Koreans (musicians, support staff and journalists) traveled to the North for the event. In addition, South Korean taekwondo artists were to perform demonstrations on April 1 and 2, with the Sunday performance at the Pyongyang Taekwondo Hall drawing an audience of about 2,300.

The concert on April 1 was attended by the North Korean leader, Kim Jong-un and his wife, Ri Sol-ju. Kim Jong-un was reported by media, including North Korean KCNA state news agency, and independent observers as enjoying himself, and praised the event himself. He also stated that North Korean musicians may hold another reciprocal event in the South in a few months, tentatively titled "Autumn has Come". Ordinary North Koreans may be persecuted for listening to foreign media without state permission; North Koreans caught watching South Korean movies, for example, face prison time. Although South Korean journalists were specifically invited to cover the concert, they were prevented from doing so, though apologized to by North intelligence director Kim Yong-chol, who blamed "a breakdown in cooperation between Kim Jong Un's security detail and concert organisers". The concerts have been seen as acts of cultural diplomacy.

== See also ==
- 2008 New York Philharmonic visit to North Korea
- April 2018 inter-Korean summit
- Korean reunification
- North Korea at the 2018 Winter Olympics
