= Joy Splash =

2026 concert tour by Joy

- Asia tour by Joy
- Promotional poster of the tour in Bangkok and Kuala Lumpur
- Location: Asia
- Associated album: From Joy, with Love
- Start date: March 15, 2026
- End date: April 25, 2026
- Legs: 1
- No. of shows: 4

Joy Splash is the first solo concert tour by South Korean singer Joy. The tour follows the release of her second extended play, From Joy, with Love, in August 2025.

== Background ==
In January 2026, the first two shows in Taipei and Hong Kong were announced, followed by additional dates in Bangkok and Kuala Lumpur in February. Joy Splash marked Joy's first solo concert tour since debuting as a member of Red Velvet. The tour commenced on March 15, 2026, at Legacy TERA in Taipei, Taiwan, and concluded at Zepp Kuala Lumpur in Malaysia, comprising four performances across Asia.

== Set list ==
The following set list is from the concert on March 15, 2026, in Taipei, Taiwan, and is not intended to represent all shows throughout the tour.

1. "Hello"
2. "Je T'aime"
3. "La Vie en Bleu"
4. "Introduce Me a Good Person" / "My Lips Like Warm Coffee" / "Yeowooya" / "Shiny Boy"
5. "Nothing's Gonna Change My Love for You"
6. "Unwritten Page"
7. "Get Up and Dance"
8. "Love Splash!"
9. "Day by Day"
10. "Happy Birthday to You"
11. "Scent of Green"

Encore:

12. "Get Up and Dance"

== Tour dates ==
List of concert dates
| Date | City | Country | Venue |
|---|---|---|---|
| March 15 | Taipei | Taiwan | Legacy TERA |
| March 21 | Hong Kong | China | AXA Dreamland |
| March 28 | Bangkok | Thailand | Phenix Grand Ballroom |
| April 25 | Kuala Lumpur | Malaysia | Zepp Kuala Lumpur |
