= If Only (Joy song) =

2021 song by Joy

Song by Joy featuring Paul Kim

from the album Hello
- Language: Korean
- Released: May 31, 2021
- Length: 3:48
- Label: SM; Dreamus
- Composer: Yoon Young-joon
- Lyricist: Yoon Young-joon

Live video
- "If Only" on YouTube

"If Only" (Korean: 좋을텐데; RR: Joheultende; lit. 'It Would Be Good') is a remake song recorded by South Korean singer and Red Velvet member Joy featuring Paul Kim. Originally recorded and released by singer Sung Si-kyung in 2002, the song was re-recorded and was released on May 31, 2021, by SM Entertainment as a track from her special remake album Hello. Composed and written by Yoon Young-joon, the song features a sound band arrangement and a flute performance. The song debuted at position 69 on South Korea's Gaon Digital Chart and charted at position 38 on the Billboard K-Pop 100.

== Background and composition ==
"If Only"
"If Only" is a song that features a sound band arrangement and a flute performance that creates the track's "affectionate and romantic atmosphere".

According to SM Entertainment, Joy will be releasing "If Only" for her special album Hello at 6:00 PM of May 31, 2020. It was reported that Paul Kim will be featuring on the song. Through Red Velvet's official social media accounts, a mood sampler, track poster, and teaser image of the track were released on the midnight of May 24. Joy revealed on Yoo Hee-yeol's Sketchbook that she thought of Paul Kim as the featuring artist on the song as soon as she heard the news that the track will be done on a duet. The song is a remake of the same name released by singer Sung Si-kyung in 2002.

"If Only" was composed and written by Yoon Young-joon. It was reported that Joy and Paul Kim will be presenting a "sweet duet harmony". The song will include their "sweet voice" and "clear vocals" that will create the track's "affectionate and romantic atmosphere. It will feature a sound band arrangement. The song will also present a "soft" flute performance. Moreover, it was outlined that the track will have a "sweet harmony". The song is composed in the key of G minor with a tempo of 97 beats per minute.

== Promotion and reception ==
A live video for "If Only" was released on June 6, 2021. The song debuted at position 69 on the 23rd weekly issue of South Korea's Gaon Digital Chart for 2021 during the period dated May 30 – June 5. The track also debuted at position 15 on the component Download Chart. It also debuted at position 90 on the component Streaming Chart and peaked at 79. The song entered the Billboard K-Pop 100 at position 48 on the chart issue dated June 19, 2021. The following week, it charted at position 38 on the chart issue dated June 26, 2021.

== Credits and personnel ==
Credits adapted from the liner notes of Hello.

Studio

- Recorded at MonoTree Studio
- Recorded at 821 Sound
- Engineered for mix at SM SSAM Studio
- Mixed at SM Blue Ocean Studio
- Mastered at 821 Sound Mastering

Personnel

- Joy – vocals
- Yoon Young-joon – songwriting, composition
- Hwang Hyun – arrangement, vocal directing, keyboard, digital editing
- Kim Byung-suk – bass
- Jeong Su-wan – guitar
- Park Ki-hoon – flute
- Kwon Ae-jin – background vocals
- Kim Hae-ron – background vocals
- Kang Sun-young – recording, digital editing
- Kim Min-hee – recording
- Lee Kyung-joon – digital editing
- Kang Eun-ji – mixing engineer
- Kim Chul-soon – mixing
- Kwon Nam-woo – mastering

== Charts ==
Weekly chart performance for "If Only"
Chart (2021)	Peak position
South Korea (Gaon)	69
South Korea (K-pop Hot 100)	38

Monthly chart performance for "If Only"
Chart (2021)	Peak position
South Korea (Gaon)	100
South Korea (K-pop Hot 100)	97

== Release history ==
Release dates and formats for "If Only"
Region	Date	Format(s)	Label(s)	Ref.
Various	May 31, 2021	Digital download; streaming	SM Entertainment; Dreamus	
