= The One and Only (South Korean TV series) =

2021 South Korean television series

- Promotional poster
- Also known as: Just One Person
- Hangul: 한 사람만
- Lit.: Only One Person
- RR: Han saramman
- MR: Han saramman
- Genre: Melodrama
- Written by: Moon Jung-min
- Directed by: Oh Hyun-jong
- Starring: Ahn Eun-jin; Kim Kyung-nam; Kang Ye-won; Park Soo-young
- Music by: Kim Jun-seok; Jeong Se-rin
- Country of origin: South Korea
- Original language: Korean
- No. of episodes: 16

Production
- Executive producers: Seung Min-sun; Min Woo-seok
- Producers: Park Seong-hye; Jeong Go-eun; Kim Ji-won; Jeon Ji-ho; Kim Mo-reum
- Running time: 70 minutes
- Production companies: KeyEast; JTBC Studios

Original release
- Network: JTBC
- Release: December 20, 2021 – February 8, 2022

The One and Only (Korean: 한 사람만) is a South Korean television series starring Ahn Eun-jin, Kim Kyung-nam, Kang Ye-won, and Park Soo-young. It premiered on JTBC on December 20, 2021, and aired every Monday and Tuesday at 23:00 (KST) till February 8, 2022. It is also available for streaming on Netflix in Korea and selected territories.

== Synopsis ==
The series tells the story of three women from very different backgrounds who have met in a hospice and decided to take down one bad person with the limited time they have left. Through unexpected events they become entangled in a murder case after meeting a mysterious hitman, and are faced with discovering the 'one person' who is truly precious.

== Cast ==
=== Main ===
- Ahn Eun-jin as Pyo In-sook

A terminally ill woman who is so insensitive to life that she does not know what emotions to choose after being sentenced to death.

- Kim Kyung-nam as Min Woo-cheon
  - Moon Seong-hyun as young Min Woo-cheon

A mysterious hitman at the bottom of his life who gets entangled in a murder case with In-sook.

- Kang Ye-won as Kang Se-yeon

A housewife who has led a responsible and ordinary life without being noticed by anyone. After being diagnosed with a terminal illness, she begins to live her life for herself.

- Park Soo-young as Seong Mi-do

A social media influencer who has been diagnosed with a terminal illness and is faced with an impending end to her glamorous life. Behind her bright exterior she hides an underlying loneliness.

=== Supporting ===
==== People around In-sook ====
- Go Doo-shim as Yuk Seong-ja

In-sook's grandmother.

- Jang Hyun-sung as Pyo Kang-seon

In-sook's father who left his daughter after a divorce.

- Seo Yeon-woo as Ha San-ah

==== Regional Investigation Unit ====
- Do Sang-woo as Jo Shi-young

A detective from the Metropolitan Police Department of the Seoul Metropolitan Police Agency.

- Lee Bong-ryun as Hwang Ma-Jin
- Jang In-seop as Oh Jin-kyu, a detective.

==== People around Woo-cheon ====
- Ahn Chang-hwan as Shin Tae-il

An ally to Min Woo-cheon who has a cautious personality and is a strong and cold-blooded killer.

- Choi Young-woo as Park Seung-sun

==== People around Se-yeon and Mi-do ====
- Han Gyu-won as Oh Young-chan

Se-yeon's husband who runs his own business after marrying Se-yeon. He lives a stable life, however his life slowly begins to fall apart when his wife is diagnosed with a terminal illness and enters the hospice ward.

- Han Kyu-won as Gu Ji-pyo

Mi-do's boyfriend who is a third-generation chaebol and the planning director of the Eunkang Group. He is a hot-headed person who communicates with the public through YouTube with a personality that is so easy-going that even his friends do not know that he is a chaebol.

- Yoon Bok-in as Hong Jang-mi

==== Morning Light ====
- Lee Soo-mi as Magdalena
- Yoon Bo-ra as Veronica

A nun for patients in the hospice.

- So Hee-jung as Moon Young-ji

A patient who has amyotrophic lateral sclerosis (ALS) disease

- Kim Soo-hyung as Lim Ji-hoo, Young-ji's child.
- Lee Hang-na as Choi Seong-hae
- Joo In-young as Cha Yeo-ul
- Sung Byung-suk as Oh Cheon-deok
- Oh Min-ae as Young-chan's mother
- Kim Byung-chun as Doctor Jo
- Kim Jeong-hwan as Kang Seo-gun
- Jang Seo-won as Jo Woong-do

A drug offender who received a community service order from the hospice and has an optimistic personality.

=== Extended ===
- Jeon Yi-soo as Ho-seon

The "best friend" of Seong Mi-do but beyond appearances they do not have a good relationship and are not close to each other. She attracts attention due to being an influential person.

- Baek Hyun-jin
- Lee Young-jin as Ji Yoon-seo, Kang Se-yeon's lawyer and classmate.

== Production ==
=== Development ===
On October 18, 2021, KeyEast announced that it had signed a production supply contract with JTBC Studios for The One and Only at an undisclosed amount.

=== Casting ===
Park Sung-hoon was initially cast as Min Woo-cheon however he stepped down from the series on July 14, 2021, due to scheduling conflicts and personal reasons.

On October 25, 2021, it was reported that Kang Ye-won was in self-quarantine after contracting COVID-19 after performing a self-test while she was not scheduled for filming as part of the production recommendation. All personnel who had come in contact with her tested negative, with filming proceeding as scheduled.

On December 6, 2021, it was reported that a staff member had contracted COVID-19 on December 4, 2021, and filming was canceled the same day. Later the staff and actors all tested negative and filming continued as scheduled.

On January 11, 2022, it was reported that one of the staff members had tested positive for the coronavirus causing filming to be halted. During the PCR testing with all the cast and crew, a confirmed case has been found among the filming crew.

== Reception ==
The series received favorable reviews from critics and viewers as a well-made drama despite its late night time slot. IZE magazine called The One and Only "the birth of a masterpiece that many people need to see." Another critic praised the acting stating: "The outstanding performances of the actors are not to be missed. Ahn Eun-jin, Kim Kyung-nam, Kang Ye-won, and Park Soo-young are conveying life characters with perfectly embodied acting … each actor's performance maximizes immersion and permeates the hearts of viewers."

Following the series subsequent release on Netflix, The One and Only went on to reach the Top 10 of Netflix Korea peaking at #3, and also enter the Top 10 of Netflix Indonesia, Netflix Philippines, and Netflix Malaysia.

== Original soundtrack ==
=== Part 1 ===
Released on December 22, 2021
| No. | Title | Lyrics | Music | Artist | Length |
|---|---|---|---|---|---|
| 1. | "Happy End" | Yangpa; Lee Chi-hoon; Song Yang-ha; Kim Jae-hyun; Oh Ji-won | Song Yang-ha; Kim Jae-hyun; Cha Jun-hee | Yangpa | 3:06 |
| 2. | "Happy End" (Inst.) | | Song Yang-ha; Kim Jae-hyun; Cha Jun-hee | | 3:06 |
| Total length: | | | | | 6:12 |

=== Part 2 ===
Released on January 3, 2022
| No. | Title | Lyrics | Music | Artist | Length |
|---|---|---|---|---|---|
| 1. | "The One and Only" (한 사람만) | Jung Sung-min (Psycho Tension); Shin Ji-hoo | Jung Sung-min (Psycho Tension); Shin Ji-hoo | msftz | 3:48 |
| 2. | "The One and Only" (한 사람만; Inst.) | | Jung Sung-min (Psycho Tension); Shin Ji-hoo | | 3:48 |
| Total length: | | | | | 7:36 |

=== Part 3 ===
Released on January 17, 2022
| No. | Title | Lyrics | Music | Artist | Length |
|---|---|---|---|---|---|
| 1. | "Stay" | Song Yang-ha; Kim Jae-hyun; Lee Ju-ah | Song Yang-ha; Kim Jae-hyun; Lee Ju-ah | Avin & Slay | 3:11 |
| 2. | "Stay" (Inst.) | | Song Yang-ha; Kim Jae-hyun; Lee Ju-ah | | 3:11 |
| Total length: | | | | | 6:22 |

=== Part 4 ===
Released on January 25, 2022
| No. | Title | Lyrics | Music | Artist | Length |
|---|---|---|---|---|---|
| 1. | "Your Name" (감정의 이름) | Hoff; KZ | Hoff; Kim Tae-young; KZ | Joy | 3:45 |
| 2. | "Your Name" (감정의 이름; Inst.) | | Hoff; Kim Tae-young; KZ | | 3:45 |
| Total length: | | | | | 7:30 |

== Viewership ==
Average TV viewership ratings
| Ep. | Original broadcast date | Average audience share (Nielsen Korea) |
| Ep. | Original broadcast date | Nationwide |
|---|---|---|
| 1 | December 20, 2021 | 2.442% (17th) |
| 2 | December 21, 2021 | 1.365% (32nd) |
| 3 | December 27, 2021 | 1.343% (31st) |
| 4 | December 28, 2021 | 0.58% (53rd) |
| 5 | January 3, 2022 | 0.896% (38th) |
| 6 | January 4, 2022 | 0.68% (48th) |
| 7 | January 10, 2022 | 0.784% (41st) |
| 8 | January 11, 2022 | 0.728% (50th) |
| 9 | January 17, 2022 | 0.875% (41st) |
| 10 | January 18, 2022 | 0.598% (53rd) |
| 11 | January 24, 2022 | 0.898% (38th) |
| 12 | January 25, 2022 | 0.676% (46th) |
| 13 | January 31, 2022 | 0.498% (50th) |
| 14 | February 1, 2022 | 0.535% (52nd) |
| 15† | February 8, 2022 | 0.664% (46th) |
| 16† | February 8, 2022 | 0.60% (50th) |
| Average | | 0.885% |
In the table above, the blue numbers represent the lowest ratings and the red numbers represent the highest ratings.; This drama airs on a cable channel/pay TV which normally has a relatively smaller audience compared to free-to-air TV/public broadcasters (KBS, SBS, MBC and EBS).; † Episode 15 and 16 were broadcast consecutively on February 8.
