= Hello (Joy EP) =

- Digital and physical (case/cassette) version cover

EP by Joy
- Released: May 31, 2021
- Recorded: 2021
- Studio: SM Studio Center (Seoul)
- Length: 22:45
- Language: Korean
- Label: SM; Dreamus
- Producer: Kenzie; Hwang Seong-je (ButterFly); Hwang-hyun (MonoTree); MinGtion; Baek Mun-chi; Lundi Blues

Joy chronology
Hello (2021)	From Joy, with Love (2025)

Singles from Hello
- 1. "Je T'aime" Released: May 26, 2021; 2. "Hello" Released: May 31, 2021

Professional ratings
Review scores
Source	Rating
IZM	3.5/5 stars

Hello (Korean: 안녕; RR: Annyeong) is the debut extended play by South Korean singer Joy. It was released on May 31, 2021, through SM Entertainment, marketed as a special release. The EP consists of six new covers of songs from the 1990s and 2000s, including the title song "Hello" and pre-released single "Je T'aime". The album features tracks produced by Kenzie, Hwang Seong-jae, Hwang Hyeon, MinGtion, Park Moon-chi, and Lundi Blues.

== Background and release ==
South Korean news outlet Star News reported on May 12, that Joy would be releasing her first solo album later in May. SM Entertainment later confirmed to Newsen that the singer was preparing the project, but did not specify a release date at the time. On May 17, it was announced that Hello will be released on May 31, consisting of six remake songs released from the 1990 to 2000s. On May 26, "Je T'aime" was pre-released, the song is a remake of the same name song by Hey released in 2001. The extended play was released digitally on May 31, alongside the music video for the title track, "Hello".

== Composition and lyrics ==
"I really like the retro sentiment to the extent that I think I want to be born in that era, a lot of films and works from those times have this modest but clean feel, and I wanted to put that into my album. My No. 1 goal was to not damage the sentiment of the original songs. I didn't want the (remade version) to sound like completely different songs. At the same time, I thought hard about how I could use my voice for a unique edge.

— Joy on the album's sound.

The album contains six covers of classic songs from the 1990s and 2000s. The title track is a modern rock remake of singer Park Hye-kyung's "Hello" released in 2003. The song features Joy's "cool" vocals in harmony, "cheerful" brass, and a "speedy" arrangement. Its lyrics share a "hopeful" message to forget the past and welcome a new day. "Je T'aime" is a cover of the song released by Hey in 2001. The song was reinterpreted from the track's original "fresh and jazzy vibes" into a "colorful and classical arrangement". The track includes a dance-like piano performance and has an "elegant string melody" that maximizes the "fantastic atmosphere" of it. The lyrics are noted for "Joy's lovely confession with a sweet tone". "Day By Day" is a remake of the song of the same name released in 1999 by the female duo As One. The song is a medium-tempo R&B ballad song with a "groovy" bass rhythm and lyrical sound that "stimulates emotions".

"If Only" featuring Paul Kim, is a remake of a song by singer Sung Si-kyung released in 2002. It creates a "poignant and romantic atmosphere" with a band arrangement and soft flute performance. "Happy Birthday to You" is a medium tempo ballad remake of a song released by Kwon Jin Won in 1999. with an acoustic sound-based arrangement, Joy's vocals "vividly express the happiness and excitement you feel on the way to celebrate your loved one's birthday". "Be There for You" is a solo version of Toy's song released in 1996. The track was reinterpreted into a retro synth-pop using a variety of keyboard instruments such as piano, synths, and melodies.

== Track listing ==
Track listing for Hello
No.	Title	Lyrics	Music	Arrangement	Length
1.	"Hello" (안녕; Annyeong)	Park Hye-kyung; Kang Hyun-min; Park Ji-won	Kang Hyun-min	Kenzie	3:38
2.	"Je T'aime"	Lee Do-yeon	Yoo Jeong-yeon	Hwang Seong-je	4:21
3.	"Day by Day"	Yoon Sa-ra	Shim Sang-won	minGtion	4:10
4.	"If Only" (좋을텐데; Joh-eultende) (featuring Paul Kim)	Yoon Young-jun	Yoon Young-jun	Hwang Hyun (MonoTree)	3:48
5.	"Happy Birthday to You"	Yoo Ki-hwan	Kwon Jin-won	Lundi Blues	2:54
6.	"Be There for You" (그럴때마다; Geureolttaemada; lit. 'Every Time')	Yoo Hee-yeol	Yoo Hee-yeol	Park Moonchi	3:57
Total length:					22:45

== Charts ==
Joy's special album "Hello" reached number one on the iTunes Album charts of 26 countries and entered the Top 5 of the US iTunes Album Chart. Joy's title track "Hello" reached the Top 10 of the Gaon Digital Chart, with all 6 tracks from her special album debuting on the chart. Joy's title track "Hello" also reached the Top 10 of Billboard's K-Pop Hot 100, with 5 tracks in total from her album also entering the chart.

Chart performance for Hello
Chart (2021)	Peak position	Sales
South Korean Albums (Gaon)	4	KOR: 151,153
Japanese Albums (Oricon)	31	JPN: 2363 (Phy.)

== Release history ==
Release history for Hello
Region	Date	Format	Label
Various	May 31, 2021	Digital download; streaming	SM; Dreamus
South Korea	June 3, 2021	CD; cassette	SM; Dreamus
South Korea	August 30, 2021	Vinyl LP	SM; Dreamus
