= From Joy, with Love =

- Digital and Jewel Case version cover

EP by Joy
- Released: August 18, 2025
- Length: 19:30
- Language: Korean
- Labels: SM; Kakao
- Producers: Johan Gustafsson; Ronny Svendsen; Oneye; Alfred George Hole; haventseenyou; Lee Joo-hyoung; Malthe Johansen; Hong Gom; Ragoon

Joy chronology
Hello (2021)	From Joy, with Love (2025)

Singles from From Joy, with Love
- 1. "Love Splash!" Released: August 18, 2025

From Joy, with Love is the second extended play by South Korean singer Joy. It was released by SM Entertainment, marketed as her first extended play, on August 18, 2025, and contains six tracks, including the lead single "Love Splash!".

== Background and release ==
On July 28, 2025, it was announced that Joy would be releasing her first extended play consisting of original material titled From Joy, with Love alongside the lead single "Love Splash!" on August 18. This marked her first solo project in four years since her special remake EP Hello in 2021. An announcement film video teaser was also released on the same day. The promotional schedules were released on July 29. An album trailer video was released on August 4. Each teaser images and mood clips video were released on August 7, August 8, August 12, and August 13. A highlight clip video was released on August 14. The music video teaser for "Love Splash!" and teaser images were released on August 15. The extended play was released alongside the music video for "Love Splash!" on August 18.

== Composition ==
From Joy, with Love contains six tracks. The title track, "Love Splash!", is a dance-pop track with a refreshing mood, blending a pounding bass, soft piano, and delicate bell sounds to create a bright and energetic atmosphere. Capturing the essence of summer, the lyrics vividly depict the exhilarating moment when love begins, set against the backdrop of a cool seaside landscape.

The second track, "Get Up and Dance", written solely by Joy, is a dance-pop track with an exciting and intense sound. The lyrics convey a passionate desire to embrace the moment by dancing with someone encountered as if by fate. The song's immersive energy is further elevated by bright and refreshing vocal performance, enhancing its vibrant and exhilarating atmosphere. The third track, "La Vie En Blue", is a pop track infused with bossa nova influences and French sensibilities, delivering a bittersweet yet romantic narrative. Through unique and charming vocals, it conveys the longing for a past lover to return to a place filled with cherished memories.

The fourth track, "Unwritten Page", is a pop ballad built on waltz rhythms, co-written by Joy. The song carries a warm message of comfort directed toward oneself, embracing self-care and self-love, while emotional vocals deliver the sentiment with calm depth and resonance. The fifth track, "Scent of Green", is described as a pop track that highlights refreshing vocals, layered over a soundscape reminiscent of a breezy summer day. The song unfolds like a heartfelt letter to a past lover, cherishing even the most awkward moments as radiant and treasured memories. The sixth and final track, "Cuddle", is a medium-tempo ballad centered on heartfelt vocals, accompanied by a gentle and lyrical piano arrangement. The song conveys warmth and gratitude through its lyrics, expressing pure affection and the comforting embrace of love shared between two people.

== Promotion ==
Prior to the release of From Joy, with Love, on August 18, 2025, Joy held a live event called "Joy 'From Joy, with Love' Countdown Live" on YouTube, TikTok and Weverse, aimed at introducing the extended play and connecting with her fanbase. An accompanying Asia tour, titled Joy Splash, was announced in January 2026. The tour comprised four dates across four countries.

== Track listing ==
From Joy, with Love track listing
No.	Title	Lyrics	Music	Arrangement	Length
1.	"Love Splash!"	Moon Seol-ri; Danke (Lalala Studio); Lee Seu-ran	Johan Gustafsson; Josefin Glenmark; GC-JR	Gustafsson	3:09
2.	"Get Up and Dance"	Joy	Ronny Svendsen; Cazzi Opeia; Nermin Harambašić; Ellen Berg	Svendsen	3:09
3.	"La Vie En Blue"	An Hye-su (XXYX)	Christian Fast; Maria Marcus; Pontus Petersson; Alfred George Hole; haventseenyou	Oneye; Hole; haventseenyou	3:16
4.	"Unwritten Page"	Lee Joo-hyoung (MonoTree); Joy	Lee; Wilhelmina; Kyle Wong; Amanda Kongshaug	Lee	3:03
5.	"Scent of Green"	Kim Bo-eun (Jam Factory); Kim Win-di (Jam Factory); Jung Na-gyeong (153/Joombas)	Malthe Johansen; Ida Skriver Olesen	Johansen	3:13
6.	"Cuddle"	Hong Gom; Ragoon	Hong; Ragoon	Hong; Ragoon	3:50
Total length:					19:30

== Credits and personnel ==
Credits adapted from the EP's liner notes.

Studio

- SM Aube Studio – recording (track 1–3, 5), digital editing (track 3, 5), engineered for mix (track 4)
- SM Droplet Studio – recording (track 1)
- Sound Pool Studio – recording (track 4), digital editing (track 1)
- SM Azure Studio – recording (track 6), digital editing, engineered for mix (track 2)
- SM Yellow Tail Studio – digital editing (track 1)
- Doobdoob Studio – digital editing (track 5–6)
- SM Big Shot Studio – digital editing, mixing (track 6)
- SM Blue Ocean Studio – mixing (track 1, 4)
- SM Concert Hall Studio – mixing (track 2)
- SM Starlight Studio – mixing (track 3)
- SM Blue Cup Studio – mixing (track 5)
- 821 Sound – mastering (all tracks)

Personnel

- SM Entertainment – executive producer
- Joy – vocals (all tracks), lyrics (track 2, 4), background vocals (track 1–3, 5)
- Moon Seol-ri – lyrics (track 1)
- Danke (Lalala Studio) – lyrics (track 1)
- Lee Seu-ran – lyrics (track 1)
- Johan Gustafsson – producer, composition, arrangement (track 1)
- Josefin Glenmark – composition (track 1)
- GC-JR – composition (track 1)
- Ronny Svendsen – producer, composition, arrangement (track 2)
- Cazzi Opeia – composition (track 2)
- Nermin Harambašić – composition (track 2)
- Ellen Berg – composition (track 2)
- An Hye-su (XYXX) – lyrics (track 3)
- Christian Fast – composition (track 3)
- Maria Marcus – composition (track 3)
- Pontus Petersson a.k.a. Oneye (Pontus "Oneye" Kalm) – producer, composition, arrangement, drums, synthesizer (track 3)
- Alfred George Hole – producer, composition, arrangement, drums, bass, synthesizer (track 3)
- haventseenyou – producer, composition, arrangement, drums, guitar, piano (track 3)
- Lee Joo-hyoung (MonoTree) – producer, lyrics, composition, arrangement, vocal directing, drums, bass, piano, Pro Tools operating, digital editing (track 4)
- Wilhelmina – composition (track 4)
- Kyle Wong – composition (track 4)
- Amanda Kongshaug – composition (track 4)
- Kim Bo-eun (Jam Factory) – lyrics (track 5)
- Kim Win-di (Jam Factory) – lyrics (track 5)
- Jung Na-gyeong (153/Joombas) – lyrics (track 5)
- Malthe Johansen a.k.a. The Child – producer, composition, arrangement, drums, keyboard, synthesizer (track 5)
- Ida Skriver Olesen – composition, background vocals (track 5)
- Hong Gom – producer, lyrics, composition, arrangement (track 6)
- Ragoon – producer, lyrics, composition, arrangement, piano (track 6)
- G-High – vocal directing (track 1, 3)
- Ikki – background vocals (track 1)
- Jake K (ARTiffect) – vocal directing (track 2)
- Jsong – vocal directing (track 5), background vocals (track 2)
- Iris – background vocals (track 4)
- Kim Soo-bin (Aiming) – vocal directing (track 6)
- Kwon Ji-yoon – piano (track 3)
- Kim Hyo-joon – recording (track 1–3, 5), digital editing (track 3, 5), engineered for mix (track 4)
- Kim Joo-hyun – recording (track 1)
- Jeong Ho-jin – recording (track 4), digital editing (track 1)
- Kim Jae-yeon – recording (track 6), digital editing, engineered for mix (track 2)
- Noh Min-ji – digital editing (track 1)
- Kang Sun-young – digital editing (track 2)
- Eugene Kwon – digital editing (track 5–6)
- Lee Min-kyu – digital editing, mixing (track 6)
- Kim Cheol-sun – mixing (track 1, 4)
- Nam Koong-jin – mixing (track 2)
- Jeong Yoo-ra – mixing (track 3)
- Jung Eui-seok – mixing (track 5)
- Kwon Nam-woo – mastering (all tracks)

== Charts ==
=== Weekly charts ===
Weekly chart performance for From Joy, with Love
Chart (2025)	Peak position
Japanese Western Albums (Oricon)	20
Japanese Download Albums (Billboard Japan)	37
Japanese Top Albums Sales (Billboard Japan)	51
South Korean Albums (Circle)	4

=== Monthly charts ===
Monthly chart performance for From Joy, with Love
Chart (2025)	Position
South Korean Albums (Circle)	15

== Release history ==
Release history for From Joy, With Love
Region	Date	Format	Label
South Korea	August 18, 2025	CD	SM; Kakao
Various	August 18, 2025	Digital download; streaming	SM; Kakao
South Korea	November 24, 2025	Vinyl LP	SM; Kakao
