= Lee Soo-mi (actress) =

South Korean actress (born 1973)

- Born: April 20, 1973 (age 52); Seoul, South Korea
- Other names: Lee Su-mi
- Occupation: Actress
- Years active: 2000 – present
- Agent(s): CL & Company
- Known for: Find Me in Your Memory; The Only and Only; Mask Girl

Korean name
- Hangul: 이수미
- RR: I Sumi
- MR: I Sumi

Lee Soo-mi (Korean: 이수미; born April 20, 1973) is a South Korean actress. She is known for her roles in dramas such as Hospital Playlist, Find Me in Your Memory, Beautiful Love, Wonderful Life, The Only and Only and Mask Girl. She also appeared in movies including The President's Last Bang, The Old Garden, Love+Sling and Emergency Declaration.

== Filmography ==
=== Film ===
Year	Title	Role	Ref.
2005	The President's Last Bang	Section chief Joo's wife	
2006	The Old Garden	Soo-mi	
2018	Love+Sling	Butcher	
2019	Family Affair	Hye-seon	
2022	Emergency Declaration	Hye-yoon's friend	
2023	Concerning My Daughter	Ms. Yoon	
2024	Pilot	Chance Yeong-hee	
2025	Go-To Restaurant	Su-mi	

=== Television series ===
Year	Title	Role	Ref.
2019	Beautiful Love, Wonderful Life	Yoo Ra-ne	
2020	Hospital Playlist	Auntie Wang	
2020	Find Me in Your Memory	Park Kyung-ae	
2021	Hospital Playlist Season 2	Auntie Wang	
2021	The Only and Only	Magdalena	
2022	I Have Not Done My Best Yet	Woowon apartment resident	
2022	Green Mothers' Club	Bakery employee	
2022	O'PENing: "Stock of High School"	Yu-mi	
2022	Fly High Butterfly	Gi-Bbeum's step mother	
2022	Unicorn	Fortune Teller	
2023	Crash Course in Romance	Restaurant owner	
2023	Mask Girl	Ahn Eun-suk	
2024	The Bequeathed	Restaurant owner's younger sister	
2024	Frankly Speaking	Ye Neung-kook-ang	
2025	When Life Gives You Tangerines	Yang-im	
2026	Undercover Miss Hong	Kim Soon-jung	

== Awards and nominations ==
Name of the award ceremony, year presented, category, nominee of the award, and the result of the nomination
Award ceremony	Year	Category	Nominee / Work	Result	Ref.
Seoul Theater Festival Acting Awards	2015	Best Actress	Their House	Won	
40th Dong-A Theater Awards (Note: The Dong-A Theater Awards (동아연극상) established in 1964 to expand and develop the base of Korean theater, have contributed to the revitalization of Korean theater by selecting and awarding performers, theater troupes and organizations that have performed outstandingly every year.)	2019	Best Actress	Aunt Texas	Won	
