= Paul Kim (musician, born 1988) =

South Korean singer

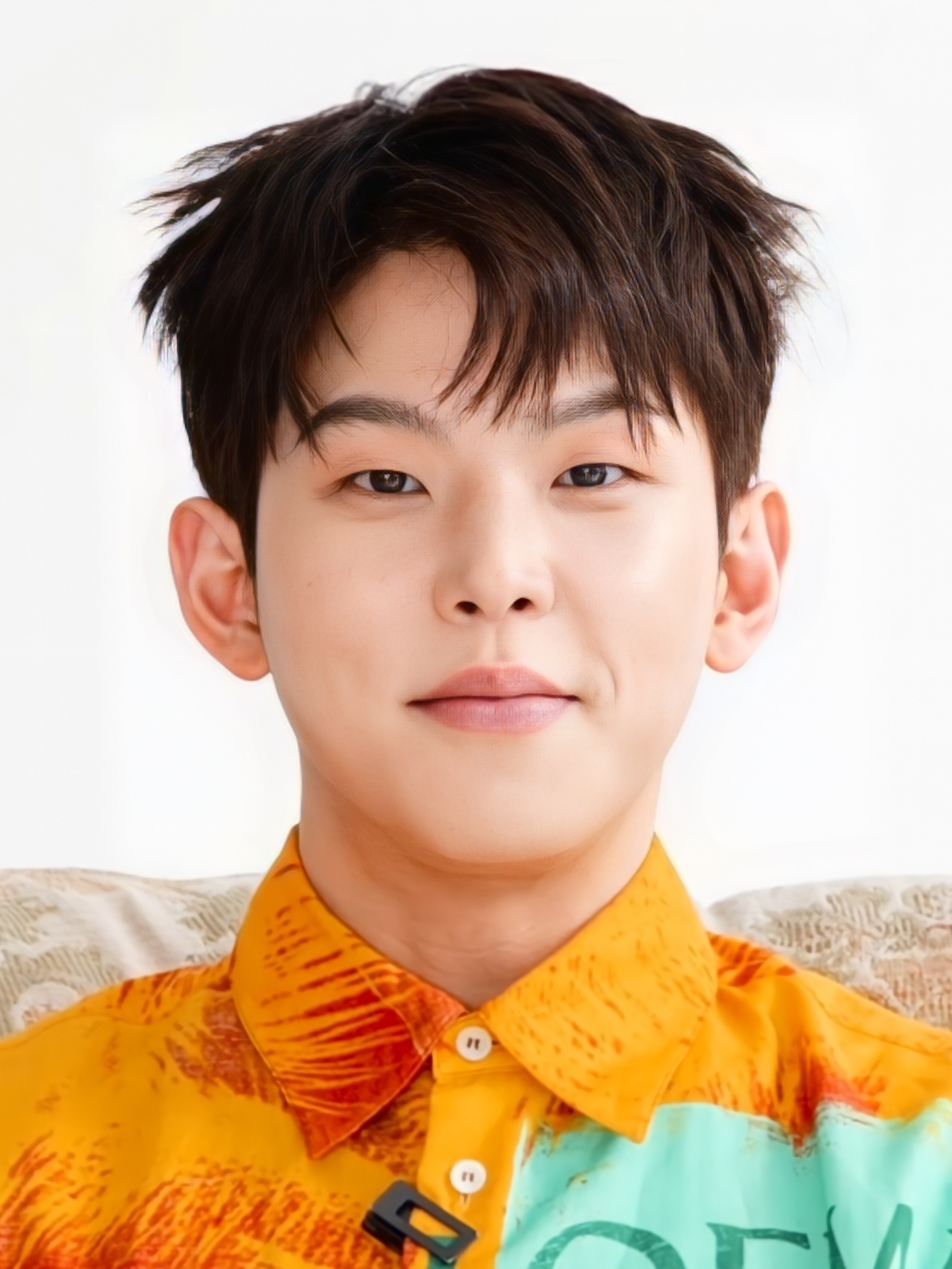
- Kim in 2022
- Born: Kim Tae-hyeong; February 11, 1988 (age 38); South Korea
- Occupation: Singer-songwriter
- Spouse: Unknown (m. 2024)
- Musical career
- Genres: K-pop; ballad
- Instrument: Vocals
- Years active: 2014–present
- Label: Neuron Music

Korean name
- Hangul: 김태형
- RR: Gim Taehyeong
- MR: Kim T'aehyŏng

Kim Tae-hyeong (Korean: 김태형; born February 11, 1988), better known as Paul Kim (폴킴) is a South Korean singer-songwriter. He debuted in 2014 and has released two extended plays and two full-length albums, one in two parts: The Road (2017) and Tunnel (2018), and one also in two parts: Heart, One (2019) and Heart, Two (2020).

== Early life ==
Born in South Korea, Kim lived in New Zealand for five years where he attended high school. He then went to an international school for his university education in Japan. Afterwards, he returned to South Korea to start his music career.

== Personal life ==
On April 25, 2024, Kim announced his marriage to his girlfriend after dating for nine years.

== Discography ==
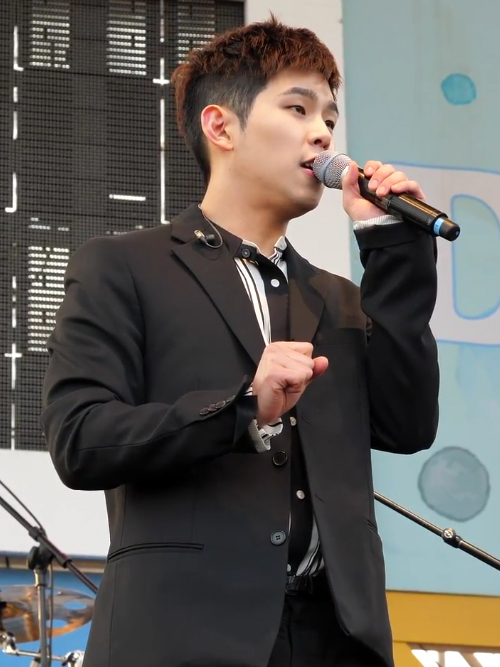
Kim performing in 2018

=== Studio albums ===
Title	Details	Peak chart positions	Sales
Title	Details	KOR	Sales
The First Album Part 1: The Road	Released: September 27, 2017; Label: Neuron Music; Format: CD, digital download	—	—N/a
The First Album Part 2: Tunnel	Released: January 31, 2018; Label: Neuron Music; Format: CD, digital download	46	—N/a
The Second Album Part 1: Heart, One	Released: October 7, 2019; Label: Neuron Music; Format: CD, digital download	36	—N/a
The Second Album Part 2: Heart, Two	Released: April 22, 2020; Label: Neuron Music; Format: CD, digital download	—	—N/a
Sincerely Yours (10th Anniversary Edition)	Released: January 21, 2025; Label: Whyes Entertainment; Format: LP, digital download	51	KOR: 1,354
"—" denotes release did not chart.

=== Extended plays ===
Title	Details	Peak chart positions	Sales
Title	Details	KOR	Sales
Song Diary	Released: March 25, 2016; Label: Neuron Music; Format: CD, digital download	22	KOR: 1,669
Her	Released: December 28, 2016; Label: Neuron Music; Format: CD, digital download	—	—N/a
Star	Released: June 14, 2022; Label: Neuron Music; Format: CD, digital download	49	—N/a
"—" denotes release did not chart.

=== Singles ===
Title	Year	Peak chart positions	Sales	Certifications	Album
Title	Year	KOR	Sales	Certifications	Album
"Would You Like Some Coffee?" (커피 한 잔 할래요)	2014	—	—N/a	—N/a	Song Diary
"Ex"	2014	—	—N/a	—N/a	Song Diary
"Doowap" (너란 주의보)	2016	—	—N/a	—N/a	Song Diary
"Rain" (비)	2016	27	KOR: 2,500,000	—N/a	Song Diary
"Dear My Love" (내 사랑)	2016	—	—N/a	—N/a	Song Diary
"Her"	2016	—	—N/a	—N/a	Her
"Meaning of Love" (사랑의 의미)	2016	—	—N/a	—N/a	Her
"Wanna Love You"	2017	— (Note: "Wanna Love You" did not enter the Gaon Digital Chart, but peaked at number 91 on the Gaon Download Chart.)	—N/a	—N/a	The Road
"The Road" (길)	2017	47	—N/a	—N/a	The Road
"Premonition" (느낌)	2018	85	—N/a	—N/a	Tunnel
"Additional"	2018	62	—N/a	—N/a	Tunnel
"Huega" (휴가)	2018	60	—N/a	—N/a	Tunnel
"Me After You" (너를 만나)	2018	1	KOR: 2,500,000	KCMA: Platinum (DL) (Note: "Me After You" was certified platinum for 2.5 million downloads October 10, 2019.); 2× Platinum (st.) (Note: "Me After You" was certified platinum for 200 million streaming in June 6, 2020)	Heart, One
"Traffic Light" (초록빛)	2019	4	—N/a	—N/a	Heart, One
"Try" (헤어질 걸 알아)	2019	19	—N/a	—N/a	Heart, One
"Empty" (허전해)	2019	3	—N/a	—N/a	Heart, One
"Big Heart" (마음)	2019	59	—N/a	—N/a	Heart, Two
"But I'll Miss You" (우리 만남이)	2020	7	—N/a	—N/a	Heart, Two
"Quarantine" (집돌이)	2020	163	—N/a	—N/a	Heart, Two
"Hangover" (너도 아는)	2020	31	—N/a	—N/a	Heart, Two
"Love Letter" (사랑하는 당신께)	2021	18	—N/a	—N/a	Heart, Two
"Wave" (파도)	2021	150	—N/a	—N/a	Summer: re
"After Summer" (찬란한 계절)	2021	48	—N/a	—N/a	Non-album singles
"Like Yesterday" (어제처럼)	2022	14	—N/a	—N/a	Non-album singles
"One More Time"	2022	97	—N/a	—N/a	Star
"Sweet Lullaby" (너의 잠을 채워줄게 (자장가))	2022	118	—N/a	—N/a	Non-album singles
"One at a Time" (하루에 하나)	2023	163	—N/a	—N/a	Non-album singles
"Hangang" (한강에서) (featuring Big Naughty)	2023	48	—N/a	—N/a	Non-album singles
"Don't Be Mad" (화 좀 풀어봐)	2023	118	—N/a	—N/a	Non-album singles
"White" (화이트)	2023	23	—N/a	—N/a	Non-album singles
"Blooming Just for You" (꽃이 피는데 필요한 몇 가지) (with NuNew)	2024	—	—N/a	—N/a	Non-album singles
"I Remember (Yours)" (난 기억해 (yours))	2025	184	—N/a	—N/a	Sincerely Yours
"—" denotes release did not chart.

=== Collaborations ===
Title	Year	Peak chart positions	Album
Title	Year	KOR	Album
"Clumsy Expectations" (서툰 기대) (with D.Story)	2015	—	Non-album single
"Just Listening to You" (널 듣고만 있어) (with 1sagain)	2015	—	Non-album single
"Not So Hot" (뜨겁지가 않아) (with Bill Stax)	2015	—	Non-album single
"Can't Let Go" (미뤄) (with Sleeq)	2015	—	Non-album single
"Thinking of You" (널 떠올리는게) (with Sool J and Ultimadrap)	2016	— (Note: "Thinking of You" did not enter the Gaon Digital Chart, but peaked at number 87 on the Gaon Download Chart.)	Non-album single
"Now I Know" (사람이) (with Jung Dong-ha)	2017	—	Life
"For Less Than a Month" (한 달을 못 가서) (with ALi)	2017	— (Note: "For Less Than a Month" did not enter the Gaon Digital Chart, but peaked at number 87 on the Gaon Download Chart.)	Expand
"Tic Tac Toe" (눈치) (with Heize and Peakboy)	2019	77	Hangout with Yoo "Yoo-plash"
"Loveship" (with Chungha)	2020	12	Non-album single
"If Only" (with Joy)	2021	69	Hello
"Question Marks" (with Choi Ye-na)	2026	TBA	Love Catcher
"—" denotes release did not chart.

=== Soundtrack appearances ===
Title	Year	Peak chart positions	Sales	Certifications	Album
Title	Year	KOR	Sales	Certifications	Album
"Hey" (있잖아)	2017	41	—N/a	—N/a	Love Playlist 2 OST
"Goodbye Kiss" (꽃비)	2017	—	—N/a	—N/a	Black Knight OST
"Every Day, Every Moment" (모든 날, 모든 순간)	2018	4	KOR: 5,000,000	KCMA: 2× Platinum (DL) (Note: "Every Day, Every Moment" was certified 2× platinum for 5 million downloads October 8, 2020.); 3× Platinum (st.) (Note: "Every Day, Every Moment" was certified platinum for 300 million streaming in June 11, 2020.)	Should We Kiss First? OST
"Inexplicable" (사랑 알 수 없나봐)	2018	21	—N/a	—N/a	Why OST
"So Long" (안녕)	2019	1	—N/a	KCMA: Platinum (st.) (Note: "So Long" was certified platinum for 100 million streaming in February 6, 2020)	Hotel Del Luna OST
"Dream"	2020	—	—N/a	—N/a	The King: Eternal Monarch OST
"Always with You" (늘 곁에서 지금처럼)	2021	—	—N/a	—N/a	Jirisan OST
"The Miracle" (기적 같은 너)	2022	188	—N/a	—N/a	Reborn Rich OST
"You Remember" (너는 기억한다)	2022	126	—N/a	—N/a	The Glory OST
"Little Star"	2024	191	—N/a	—N/a	Little Star (The Last 10 Years) OST
"Can't Get Over You" (좋아해요)	2024	51	—N/a	—N/a	Queen of Tears OST
"Always Be with You" (내가 널 지켜줄게)	2025	157	—N/a	—N/a	Love Scout OST
"—" denotes release did not chart.

== Filmography ==
=== Television shows ===
Year	Title	Role	Notes	Ref.
2016	Duet Song Festival	Contestant (Episode 5)	Younha's Partner; Sang "Around Thirty (서른 즈음에)"	
2019	Begin Again	Cast	season 3	
2022	Secret Man and Woman	Host		
2022	Second World	Host	Judge	
2026	Veiled Cup	Judge		

=== Web series ===
Year	Title		Role	Notes	Ref.
Year	English	Korean	Role	Notes	Ref.
2018	Not Alright, But It's Alright	하찮아도 괜찮아 시즌	Himself	Cameo	

=== Web shows ===
Year	Title	Role	Ref.
2022	Gomak Boys	Cast Member	

=== Radio shows ===
Year	Title	Role	Notes	Ref.
2022	Dream Radio	Special DJ	from 7 February to 20 February	

== Theater ==
Year	Title	Role	Ref.
2021–2022	Jack the Ripper	Jack	
2022–2023	Jesus Christ Superstar	Caiaphas	

== Awards and nominations ==
Name of the award ceremony, year presented, edition, category, nominee of the award, and the result of the nomination
Award ceremony	Year	Category	Nominee(s) / Work(s)	Result	Ref.
Brand of the Year Awards	2022	Best Male Solo Artist	Paul Kim	Won	
Gaon Chart Music Awards	2019	Music Steady Seller of the Year	"Me After You"	Won	
Gaon Chart Music Awards	2020	Artist of the Year – Digital Music (January)	"Loveship" (with Chungha)	Nominated	
Genie Music Awards	2018	Best Original Soundtrack	"Every Day, Every Moment"	Won	
Genie Music Awards	2019	Best Male Solo Artist	Paul Kim	Won	
Genie Music Awards	2019	The Top Music (Daesang)	"Me After You"	Won	
Golden Disc Awards	2018	Best OST Award	"Every Day, Every Moment"	Won	
Golden Disc Awards	2019	Digital Bonsang	"Me After You"	Won	
Korean Popular Music Awards	2018	Best Original Soundtrack	"Every Day, Every Moment"	Nominated	
KOMCA Awards	2020	Best Streaming Song	"Every Day, Every Moment"	Won	
Korea First Brand Awards (Note: Hosted by the Korea Consumer Brand Committee and the Korea Consumer Forum, the Korea First Brand Awards bases its winners on a nationwide South Korean survey)	2021	Best Male Vocalist	Paul Kim	Won	
Melon Music Awards	2018	Best OST Award	"Every Day, Every Moment"	Won	
Melon Music Awards	2019	Top 10 Artist	Paul Kim	Nominated	
Melon Music Awards	2019	Song of the Year	"Traffic Light"	Nominated	
Melon Music Awards	2019	Best Ballad Award	"Traffic Light"	Nominated	
Mnet Asian Music Awards	2018	Best Original Soundtrack	"Every Day, Every Moment"	Nominated	
Mnet Asian Music Awards	2019	Best Male Artist	Paul Kim	Nominated	
Mnet Asian Music Awards	2019	Artist of the Year	Paul Kim	Nominated	
Mnet Asian Music Awards	2019	Worldwide Fans’ Choice Top 10	Paul Kim	Nominated	
Mnet Asian Music Awards	2019	Song of the Year	"So Long"	Nominated	
Mnet Asian Music Awards	2019	Best Original Soundtrack	"So Long"	Nominated	
Seoul Music Awards	2019	Bonsang Award	Paul Kim	Won	
Seoul Music Awards	2020	Bonsang Award	"Maum, Pt. 2"	Nominated	
Seoul Music Awards	2020	Best Ballad Award	“Hangover”	Nominated	
Seoul Music Awards	2020	Best R&B/Hip Hop Award	“Maum, Pt. 2”	Nominated	

=== State honors ===
Name of country, year given, and name of honor
Country	Year	Honor Or Award	Ref.
South Korea (Note: Honors are given at the Korean Popular Culture and Arts Awards, arranged by the Korea Creative Content Agency and hosted by the Ministry of Culture, Sports and Tourism. They are awarded to those who have contributed to the arts and South Korea's pop culture.)	2022	Minister of Culture, Sports and Tourism Commendation	
