= Hospital Playlist =

South Korean medical drama television series

- Official promotional poster for season 2
- Hangul: 슬기로운 의사생활
- Hanja: 슬기로운 醫師生活
- Lit.: Wise Doctor Life
- RR: Seulgiroun uisasaenghwal
- MR: Sŭlgiroun ŭisasaenghwal
- Genre: Medical drama; Romance; Comedy; Slice-of-life
- Created by: Lee Myung-han (tvN)
- Written by: Lee Woo-jung
- Directed by: Shin Won-ho
- Starring: Jo Jung-suk; Yoo Yeon-seok; Jung Kyung-ho; Kim Dae-myung; Jeon Mi-do
- Country of origin: South Korea
- Original language: Korean
- No. of seasons: 2
- No. of episodes: 24

Production
- Executive producer: Park Seung-jae
- Producer: Choi Sung-yoon
- Camera setup: Single-camera
- Running time: 72–121 minutes
- Production companies: Egg Is Coming (Note: Acquired by CJ ENM in 2022.); CJ ENM

Original release
- Network: tvN
- Release: March 12, 2020 – September 16, 2021

Related
- Resident Playbook (2025)

Hospital Playlist (Korean: 슬기로운 의사생활) is a South Korean television series written by Lee Woo-jung and directed by Shin Won-ho. It is the second installment of the Wise Life series, following Prison Playbook (2017–18). It stars Jo Jung-suk, Yoo Yeon-seok, Jung Kyung-ho, Kim Dae-myung, and Jeon Mi-do.

The first season aired on tvN every Thursday from March 12 to May 28, 2020. Each episode was released on Netflix in South Korea, Asia-Pacific, Latin America and English-speaking countries after their television broadcast. (Note: For Japan and rest of the world, all episodes (season 1) were launched at once on April 6, 2020.) By the conclusion of the first season, the series became the ninth highest-rated Korean drama in cable television history at the time.

The second season aired between June 17 and September 16, 2021. According to Nielsen Korea, the first episode recorded 10.007% viewership, setting the record for the highest premiere ratings in the network's history.

== Premise ==
Hospital Playlist follows the lives of five doctors in their forties, Lee Ik-jun (Jo Jung-suk), Ahn Jeong-won (Yoo Yeon-seok), Kim Jun-wan (Jung Kyung-ho), Yang Seok-hyeong (Kim Dae-myung) and Chae Song-hwa (Jeon Mi-do), working at the Yulje Medical Centre, who first became friends during medical school.

Lee Ik-jun is an assistant professor of general surgery specializing in liver transplants and a single father to his only son Woo-joo (Kim Joon) after getting divorced from his absent wife. His cheerful charisma allows him to connect with both patients and doctors, making him a popular figure in the hospital.

A devout Catholic, Ahn Jeong-won is the son of the founder of the hospital and an assistant professor of pediatric surgery, cherished by his patients for his caring and sensible personality. However, seeing his patients suffer causes him distress, so he is secretly planning to become a priest against the wishes of his mother, Jung Ro-sa (Kim Hae-sook).

Kim Jun-wan is an associate professor and later head of the cardiothoracic surgery department at Yulje, admired and feared by his subordinates due to his exceptional surgical skills and his cold demeanor. He has known Ik-jun and his family, including his lively sister Ik-sun (Kwak Sun-young), since childhood.

Yang Seok-hyeong is an assistant professor of obstetrics and gynaecology perceived as aloof and sometimes detached due to his introverted personality, but he is in reality attentive and understanding toward his patients. He is divorced and has a complicated family history, but deeply cares about his mother.

The only woman in the group of friends, Chae Song-hwa, is an associate professor of neurosurgery, respected as a doctor by her colleagues and patients alike thanks to her career achievements, accommodating disposition and personality.

== Cast ==
=== Main ===
- Jo Jung-suk as Lee Ik-jun, an assistant professor of general surgery. He is recently divorced after his wife decided that a long distance marriage like theirs was not an ideal situation and she already has a partner. He is currently raising his son on his own.
- Yoo Yeon-seok as Ahn Jeong-won/Andrea, an assistant professor of pediatric surgery. He is the son of the founder of the hospital. His older brothers are priests and his older sisters are nuns. He has been applying to enter a seminary to become a priest.
- Jung Kyung-ho as Kim Jun-wan, an associate professor of cardiothoracic surgery, became chief of the CS department later on.
- Kim Dae-myung as Yang Seok-hyeong, an assistant professor of obstetrics and gynecology.
- Jeon Mi-do as Chae Song-hwa, an associate professor of neurosurgery.

=== Supporting ===
==== Doctors ====
- Shin Hyun-been as Jang Gyeo-ul, third-year resident, later fellow doctor in general surgery. As the only resident for general surgery, specialist doctors typically rely on her assistance for cases outside their scope.
- Jung Moon-sung as Do Jae-hak, chief resident, later fellow in cardiothoracic surgery.
- Ahn Eun-jin as Chu Min-ha, second-year, later chief resident in obstetrics and gynecology.
- Kim Jun-han as Ahn Chi-hong, third-year resident in neurosurgery.
- Moon Tae-yoo as Yong Seok-min, chief resident, later fellow in neurosurgery.
- Ha Yoon-kyung as Heo Sun-bin, third-year, later fellow in neurosurgery.
- Choi Young-joon as Bong Gwang-hyun, assistant professor of emergency medicine.
- Seo Jin-won as Min Gi-joon, professor of neurosurgery.
- Kim Hye-in as Myung Eun-won, second-year, later chief resident in obstetrics and gynecology resident.
- Choi Young-woo as Cheon Myung-tae, professor of cardiothoracic surgery.
- Shin Do-hyun as Bae Joon-hee, fellow in emergency medicine.
- Jeon Kwang-jin as Jong Se-hyuk, fellow in orthopedic surgery.
- Lee Se-hee as Kang So-ye, fellow in emergency medicine.
- Woo Jung-won as Yeom Se-hee, professor of obstetrics and gynecology.
- Lee Do-hye as Ki Eun-mi, first-year resident in obstetrics and gynecology.

==== Nurses and medical students ====
- Kim Soo-jin as Song Soo-bin, surgical ward nurse.
- Bae Hyun-sung as Jang Hong-do, third-year medical student, later intern and Yun-bok's twin brother.
- Cho Yi-hyun as Jang Yun-bok, third-year medical student, later intern and Hong-do's twin sister.
- Yoon Hye-ri as So Yi-hyun, cardiothoracic surgery medical assistant.
- Yang Jo-ah as Hwang Jae-shin, neurosurgery medical assistant.
- Lee Noh-ah as Lee Young-ha, surgical ward nurse.
- Lee Dal as Kim Jae-hwan, surgical ward nurse.
- Lee Hye-eun as Kook Hye-sung, general surgery medical assistant.
- Lee Ji-won as Han Hyun-hee, pediatric surgery medical assistant.
- Lee Soo-hyun as Nam Ji-min, pediatric intensive care unit nurse.
- Lee Jong-won as Kim Geon-eun, second-year medical student.
- Lee Jung-won as Hwang Ji-woo, second-year medical student.
- Kim Ji-sung as Han Seung-joo, obstetrics and gynecology delivery room nurse.
- Seol Yu-jin as Eun Sun-jin, obstetrics and gynecology medical assistant.
- Kim Bi-bi as Ham Deok-joo, transplant coordinator.
- Park Han-sol as Sunwoo Hee-soo, emergency room nurse.
- Kim Kang-min as Im Chang-min, intern.
- Lee Chan-hyeong as Choi Seon-young, intern.
- Chae Min-hee as So-yeon.

==== Family members of the main characters ====
- Kwak Sun-young as Lee Ik-sun, Ik-jun's younger sister, who is a soldier.
- Kim Joon as Lee Woo-joo, Ik-jun's son.
- Lee Soo-mi as Aunty Wang, Woo-joo's nanny.
- Ki Eun-se as Yuk Hye-jeong, Ik-jun's ex-wife.
- Kim Hae-sook as Jung Ro-sa, Jeong-won's mother.
- Sung Dong-il as Ahn Dong-il/Peter, Jeong-won's eldest brother.
- Kim Kap-soo as Joo Jong-soo, Chairman of the Yulje Foundation and Ro-sa's childhood friend.
- Cho Seung-yeon as Joo Jun, Director of Yulje Medical Center.
- Moon Hee-kyung as Jo Young-hye, Seok-hyeong's mother.
- Park Ji-yeon as Yoon Shin-hye, Seok-hyeong's ex-wife.
- Shin Hye-kyung as Seok-hyeong's former mother-in-law.
- Nam Myung-ryeol as Yang Tae-yang, Seok-hyeong's father.
- Lee So-yoon as Kim Tae-yeon, Yang Tae-yang's mistress.

=== Special appearances ===
Season 1

- Hwang Young-hee as liver transplant patient's mother (Ep. 1)
- Yeom Hye-ran as Min-young's mother (Ep. 1)
- Kim Sung-kyun as Jung-won's second eldest brother (Ep. 1)
- Ye Ji-won as Jung-won's eldest sister (Ep. 1)
- Jang Hee-jung as Bit-na's mother (Ep. 1)
- Song Duk-ho as KWMC resident (Ep. 1)
- Oh Yoon-ah as Jung-won's second eldest sister (Ep. 1)
- Park Hyung-soo as Lawyer Pyeon (Ep. 1 & 10–12)
- Jung Jae-sung as Chief of Neurosurgery (Ep. 1)
- Lee Ju-myoung as Song PD (Ep. 1)
- Kim Gook-hee as Gal Ba-ram (Ep. 2)
- Kim Dae-gon as Gal Ba-ram's husband (Ep. 2)
- Kim Sung-cheol as No Jin-hyung (Ep. 2)
- Kim Han-jong as Gong Hyung-woo (Ep. 2)
- Lee Soo-geun as radio host (Ep. 3; voice)
- Eun Ji-won as radio host (Ep. 3; voice)
- Shim Dal-gi as Chan-hyung's mother (Ep. 3)
- Gi Eun-se as Yuk Hye-jung (Ep. 3)
- Anupam Tripathi as Foreign patient's co-worker (Ep. 4)
- Go Ara as Go Ara (Ep. 5–6)
- Kim Dong-kyu (Ep. 5; voice)
- Choi Moo-sung as Ik-jun's patient's husband (Ep. 7)
- Lee Ji-hyun as Shin Min-ji (Ep. 7)
- Kim Sun-young as Ik-jun's patient (Ep. 7)
- Cha Soo-rin as Oh Yu-min (Ep. 9)
- Jung Min-sung as Lee Chang-hak (Ep. 11–12)
- Park Bo-kyung as Chang-hak's wife (Ep. 11–12)
- Lee Jae-in as So-mi (Ep. 11)

Season 2

- Cha Chung-hwa as Yeon-woo's mother (Ep. 1)
- Ahn Si-ha as Kim Soo-jung (Ep. 1)
- Ryu Hye-rin as Seung-won's mother (Ep. 2)
- Ko Na-young as Yoo Kyung-jin (Ep. 2–3)
- Lee Ji-ha as Yoo Han-yang and Yoo Kyung-jin's mother (Ep. 2–3)
- Lee Ji-hyun as Min-chan's Mother (Ep. 2, 4)
- Lee Kyu-hyung as Yoo Han-yang (Ep. 3)
- Im Soo-jung as Chae Eun (Ep. 3)
- Ahn Chang-hwan as Baek Hyung-do (Ep. 3; voice)
- Jung Seung-gil as son of the brain tumor patient (Ep. 8)
- Yoo Jae-myung as Shin Sung-eui, professor of radiology (Ep. 9)
- Hyun Jung-hwa as professor of nuclear medicine (Ep. 9)
- Lee Bom-so-ri as OB-GYN fellow (Ep. 9)
- Joo Sae-hyuk as fellow in nuclear medicine (Ep. 9)
- Lee Il-hwa as Gyeo-ul's mother (voice)
- Park Jung-woo as Jang Ga-eul, Gyeo-ul's younger brother (Ep. 10)
- Na Yeong-seok as Jang Young-seok, the father of Mo-ne and Ma-ne (Ep. 10)
- Choi Deok-moon as Chu Cheol-woo, Min-ha's father (Ep. 10)
- Jang Hye-jin as Min-ha's mother (Ep. 10)
- Kim Jun-han as Ahn Chi-hong (Ep. 11)

== Episodes ==
Season	Episodes	Originally released		Time slot	Avg. viewership (millions)
Season	Episodes	First released	Last released	Time slot	Avg. viewership (millions)
1	12	March 12, 2020	May 28, 2020	Thursday at 21:00 (KST)	2.898
2	12	June 17, 2021	September 16, 2021	Thursday at 21:00 (KST)	3.203

== Production ==
=== Development ===
In January 2019, it was reported that Shin Won-ho would direct a medical television series and the production team was in the early stages of casting actors. Screenwriter Lee Woo-jung and director Shin Won-ho previously worked together on the critically acclaimed Reply (2012–16) anthology series as well as the hit black comedy series Prison Playbook (2017–18). Actors Jung Kyung-ho and Yoo Yeon-seok also previously worked with the duo. It took four years for the script to be completed. In order to comply to the 52-hour week system and to avoid overnight filming with regard to the cast and crew's health, the production team decided to air one episode a week for a total of twelve weeks instead of broadcasting two episodes a week for eight weeks as it is usually the case for South Korean television series.

=== Filming ===
Principal photography for the first season started in early October 2019. Some scenes taking place in Gangwoon University Hospital and Yulje Medical Center were respectively filmed in Hallym University Dongtan Sacred Heart Hospital (in Hwaseong, Gyeonggi) and Ewha Womans University Medical Center (in Gangseo District, Seoul), though the latter scenes of the season were filmed on set due to the COVID-19 pandemic. Filming for the first season was completed in late April 2020.

Originally scheduled to begin in early December 2020, filming for the second season was postponed to late January 2021 due to the COVID-19 pandemic. Filming ended on September 6, 2021.

=== Future ===
Shin initially developed Hospital Playlist with three seasons in mind, which should've been released across three years, but at the end of season two he expressed uncertainty toward the future of the series, citing exhaustion and other problems as reasons. Both the cast members and the production team stated they would be willing to work on a future season. Jeon Mi-do said that she often talks about an eventual third season with her four other co-stars and they take "turns to nag the director" about it.

== Music ==
=== Albums ===
==== Season 1 ====
Hospital Playlist

Soundtrack album by various artists
- Released: June 4, 2020
- Length: 86:59
- Languages: Korean; English
- Labels: Studio MaumC; Egg Is Coming; Stone Music Entertainment
- Producer: Ma Joo-hee

The Hospital Playlist original soundtrack produced by Ma Joo-hee was released on June 4, 2020, by Studio MaumC, Egg Is Coming and Stone Music Entertainment. It consists of covers of popular Korean songs released in the 1990s and 2000s. All songs charted on the Gaon Digital Chart and twelve on the K-pop Hot 100, with some receiving several nominations and awards. Doyeon Lee of Billboard noted that the soundtrack "was well received by listeners of all ages for its remakes of popular 90s hits."

Track listing
No.	Title	Lyrics	Music	Artist	Length
1.	"Lonely Night"	Kim Tae-won	Kim Tae-won	Kwon Jin-ah (Note: Original song by Boohwal, released in 1997.)	4:02
2.	"Introduce Me a Good Person" (좋은 사람 있으면 소개시켜줘)	Kim Hee-tam	Jung Jae-hyung	Joy (Red Velvet) (Note: Original song by Basis, released in 1996.)	3:03
3.	"Aloha" (아로하)	Kim Tae-hoon	Wi Jong-soo	Jo Jung-suk (Note: Original song by Cool, released in 2001.)	4:04
4.	"Confession Is Not Flashy" (화려하지 않은 고백)	Oh Tae-ho	Oh Tae-ho	Kyuhyun (Super Junior) (Note: Original song by Lee Seung-hwan, released in 1993.)	3:48
5.	"Beautiful My Love" (그대 고운 내 사랑)	Yoon Min-seok	Yoon Min-seok	Urban Zakapa (Note: Original song by Lee Jeong-yeol, released in 1999.)	3:50
6.	"In Front of City Hall at the Subway Station" (시청 앞 지하철 역에서)	Kim Chang-gi	Kim Chang-gi	Kwak Jin-eon (Note: Original song by Zoo, released in 1990.)	4:59
7.	"You Always" (넌 언제나)	Jang Kyung-ah	Park Jung-won	J Rabbit (Note: Original song by Mono, released in 1993.)	4:16
8.	"With My Tears" (내 눈물 모아)	Kim Hee-tam	Jung Jae-hyung	Wheein (Mamamoo) (Note: Original song by Seo Ji-won, released in 1996.)	4:13
9.	"The Wind Is Blowing" (바람이 부네요)	Im In-geon	Im In-geon	Lee So-ra (Note: Original song by Im In-gun, released in 2016.)	4:31
10.	"Oh! What a Shiny Night (Drama Version)" (밤이 깊었네)	Han Kyung-rok	Han Kyung-rok	Mido and Falasol (Note: Original song by Crying Nut, released in 2001.)	2:38
11.	"Canon (Drama Version)" (캐논)		Johann Pachelbel	Mido and Falasol	2:49
12.	"Beyond the Rainbow Forest" (넌 따뜻해)	Kim Jin-hak	Kim Jin-hak	Park Hyuk-jin	4:30
13.	"While Living Life" (사노라면)	Kim Moon-eung	Gil Ok-yoon	Oohyo (Note: Original song by Jeon In-kwon, released in 1987.)	4:05
14.	"I Knew I Love" (사랑하게 될 줄 알았어)	Lee Sang-gyu	Lee Sang-gyu	Jeon Mi-do (Note: Original song by Shin Hyo-beom, released in 2006.)	4:21
15.	"Me to You, You to Me" (너에게 난, 나에게 넌)	Song Bong-joo	Song Bong-joo	Mido and Falasol (Note: Original song by Jatanpung, released in 2001.)	3:52
16.	"Sorrowful (Piano Ver. 1)"			Kim Jin-hak	4:38
17.	"Affect"			Song Ha-min	2:01
18.	"Moving Forward (Full Version)"			Kim Jin-hak	2:27
19.	"Frozen Dream"			Song Ha-min	1:46
20.	"Monday"			Song Ha-min	1:32
21.	"Oh! What a Shiny Night (Drama Version)" (Inst.)				2:38
22.	"Beyond the Rainbow Forest" (Inst.)				4:30
23.	"While Living Life" (Inst.)				4:05
24.	"I Knew I Love" (Inst.)				4:21
Total length:					86:59

OST Special (Note: Released on June 10, 2021)
No.	Title	Lyrics	Music	Artist	Length
1.	"Introduce Me a Good Person (Drama Ver.)" (좋은 사람 있으면 소개시켜줘)	Kim Hee-tam	Jung Jae-hyung	Mido and Falasol	2:05
2.	"With My Tears (Drama Ver.)" (내 눈물 모아)	Kim Hee-tam	Jung Jae-hyung	Mido and Falasol	3:52
3.	"Confession Is Not Flashy (Drama Ver.)" (화려하지 않은 고백)	Oh Tae-ho	Oh Tae-ho	Mido and Falasol	3:55

==== Season 2 ====
Hospital Playlist Season 2

Soundtrack album by Various Artists
- Released: 2021
- Length: 156:39
- Languages: Korean; English
- Labels: Studio MaumC; Egg Is Coming; Stone Music Entertainment

Singles from Hospital Playlist Season2
- 1. "Rain and You" Released: June 18, 2021; 2. "In Front of the Post Office in Autumn" Released: June 25, 2021; 3. "I Like You" Released: July 2, 2021; 4. "I Love You More Than Anyone" Released: July 9, 2021; 5. "I Like You" Released: July 16, 2021; 6. "Superstar" Released: July 23, 2021; 7. "Let's Forget It (Drama Version)" Released: July 30, 2021; 8. "Already One Year (Drama Version)" Released: July 30, 2021; 9. "To You" Released: August 6, 2021; 10. "Is It Still Beautiful" Released: August 13, 2021; 11. "Reminiscence" Released: August 20, 2021; 12. "It's My Life" Released: August 27, 2021; 13. "You Have a Crush on Me (Drama Version)" Released: September 3, 2021; 14. "Rain and You (Drama Version)" Released: September 3, 2021; 15. "I Like You (Drama Version)" Released: September 3, 2021; 16. "Running in the Sky" Released: September 10, 2021; 17. "Butterfly" Released: September 17, 2021; 18. "Someday" Released: September 17, 2021

The soundtrack album peaked on number 8 on weekly Gaon Album Chart and as of October 2021, 31,468 copies have been sold.

==== Track listing ====
CD 1
No.	Title	Lyrics	Music	Artist	Length
1.	"Rain and You" (비와 당신)	Bang Joon-seok	Bang Joon-seok	Lee Mu-jin (Note: Original song released in 2006 by Park Joong-hoon.)	4:21
2.	"In Front of the Post Office in Autumn" (가을 우체국 앞에서)	Kim Hyun-sung	Kim Hyun-sung	Kim Dae-myung (Note: Original song released in 1994 by Yoon Do-hyun.)	4:28
3.	"I Like You" (나는 너 좋아)	Kim Soon-gon	Cho Yong-pil	Jang Beom-june (Note: Original song released in 1983 by Cho Yong-pil.)	3:07
4.	"I Love You More Than Anyone" (누구보다 널 사랑해)	Joomin	Dabi	Twice (Note: Original song released in 1999 by Bijou.)	3:37
5.	"I Like You" (좋아좋아)	Nadeul	Nadeul	Jo Jung-suk (Note: Original song released in 1996 by Weather Cast.)	3:35
6.	"Superstar" (슈퍼스타)	Lee Han-chul	Lee Han-chul	Mido and Falasol (Note: Original song released in 2005 by Lee Han-chul.)	3:36
7.	"To You" (너에게)	Kim Hyung-seok	Kim Hyung-seok	Yoo Yeon-seok (Note: Original song released in 1989 by Kim Kwang-seok.)	3:46
8.	"Is It Still Beautiful" (여전히 아름다운지)	You Hee-yeol	You Hee-yeol	Seventeen (Note: Original song released in 1999 by Kim Yeon-woo.) (Note: Credited as a song by Seventeen, but sung by Woozi, DK and Seungkwan.)	4:35
9.	"Reminiscence" (회상)	Kim Chang-hoon	Kim Chang-hoon	Jung Kyung-ho (Note: Original song released in 1982 by Sanulrim.)	3:56
10.	"It's My Life"	Richie Sambora; Jon Bon Jovi; Max Martin	Richie Sambora; Jon Bon Jovi; Max Martin	Yoon Mi-rae (Note: Original song released in 2000 by Bon Jovi.)	4:16
11.	"Running in the Sky" (하늘을 달리다)	Lee Juck	Lee Juck	Hynn (Note: Original song released in 2003 by Lee Juck.)	4:22
12.	"Butterfly"	Kang Hyun-min; Lee Jae-hak	Lee Jae-hak	Jeon Mi-do (Note: Original song released in 2009 by Loveholics.)	3:28
13.	"Someday" (언젠가는)	Lee Sang-eun	Lee Sang-eun; Ahn Jin-woo	Mido and Falasol (Note: Original song released in 1993 by Lee Sang-eun.)	3:52
14.	"Hospital Playlist Season2 Title"		Lee Sang-hoon; Lee Sang-hyuk		0:16
15.	"An Ordinary Story"		Ahn Eun-jung		2:11
16.	"Anxious Thing"		Lee Sang-hoon		1:07
17.	"Emergency"		Jbie; Key		1:56
18.	"Praying"		Ahn Eun-jung		2:57
19.	"The Sun Is Up Again"		Lee Sang-hyuk		1:52
20.	"Everyone Has Pain"		Lee Sang-hoon		2:36
21.	"Cutie"		Jbie; key		1:19
22.	"What"		Lee Jeong-min		1:33
23.	"Funny Joke"		Lee Sang-hyuk		1:24
24.	"Bad Thing"		Lee Sang-hoon		1:19
25.	"Urgent Patient"		Lee Sang-hoon		1:32

CD 2
No.	Title	Lyrics	Music	Artist	Length
1.	"Is It Still Beautiful" (Drama Version)	You Hee-yeol	You Hee-yeol	Mido and Falasol	4:19
2.	"It's My Life" (Drama Version)	Richie Sambora; Jon Bon Jovi; Max Martin	Richie Sambora; Jon Bon Jovi; Max Martin	Mido and Falasol	3:48
3.	"Running in the Sky" (Drama Version)	Lee Juck	Lee Juck	Mido and Falasol	4:29
4.	"Butterfly" (Drama Version)	Kang Hyun-min; Lee Jae-hak	Lee Jae-hak	Mido and Falasol	4:10
5.	"Let's Forget It" (이젠 잊기로 해요; Drama Version)	Lee Jang-hee	Lee Jang-hee	Mido and Falasol (Note: Original song released in 1974 by Lee Jang-hee.)	4:35
6.	"Already One Year" (벌써 일 년; Drama Version)	Han Kyung-hye	Yoon Gun	Mido and Falasol (Note: Original song released in 2001 by Brown Eyes.)	3:51
7.	"You Have a Crush on Me" (넌 내게 반했어; Drama Version)	Lee Sang-woo	Lee Sang-woo; Jung Woo-yong; Jung Min-joon; Hwang Hyun-sung	Mido and Falasol (Note: Original song released in 2004 by No Brain.)	3:46
8.	"Rain and You" (비와 당신; Drama Version)	Bang Joon-seok	Bang Joon-seok	Mido and Falasol (Note: Original song released in 2006 by Park Joong-hoon.)	4:05
9.	"I Like You" (나는 너 좋아; Drama Version)	Kim Soon-gon	Cho Yong-pil	Mido and Falasol (Note: Original song released in 1983by Cho Yong-pil.)	3:32
10.	"White-robed Angel"		Jbie; Key		2:16
11.	"Choding"		Ahn Eun-jung		1:21
12.	"No Word"		Ahn Eun-jung; Lee Sang-hyuk		1:27
13.	"Chu Chu Love"		Moon Jung-wook		1:20
14.	"99's Swing"		Ahn Eun-jung		1:46
15.	"Anxious Thoughts"		Lee Sang-hoon		1:56
16.	"Long Surgery"		Lee Sang-hoon		1:31
17.	"Promise"		Jang Hanna		1:09
18.	"Sick Story"		Lee Sang-hoon		1:08
19.	"Saving People"		Jbie; Key		2:30
20.	"OMG"		Lee Jeong-min		1:43
21.	"Solution"		Ahn Eun-jung		2:43
22.	"Hold Hands"		Lee Sang-hoon		1:14
23.	"Winter Flower"		Ahn Eun-jung		1:46
24.	"Yawn"		Jbie; Key		1:11
25.	"Small Hope"		Jang Hanna		1:45
26.	"Sunset"		Lee Sang-hyuk		2:33
27.	"White Jacket"		Lee Sang-hoon		1:18
28.	"Green Cross"		Lee Sang-hyuk		1:03

Physical CD only
No.	Title	Lyrics	Music	Artist	Length
1.	"I Like You" (나는 너 좋아;Acoustic Version)	Kim Soon-gon	Cho Yong-pil	Jang Beom-june	3:07
2.	"It's My Life" (Acoustic Version)	Richie Sambora; Jon Bon Jovi; Max Martin	Richie Sambora; Jon Bon Jovi; Max Martin	Yoon Mi-rae	4:16

=== Singles ===
List of singles, with selected chart positions, showing year released and certifications
Title	Year	Peak chart positions		Remarks	Certifications
Title	Year	KOR Gaon	KOR Hot	Remarks	Certifications
Season 1
"Lonely Night" (Kwon Jin-ah)	2020	35	30	Part 1	
"Introduce Me a Good Person" (Joy)	2020	6	5	Part 2	
"Aloha" (Jo Jung-suk)	2020	1	1	Part 3	KMCA: Platinum (Note: Platinum for streaming)
"Confession Is Not Flashy" (Kyuhyun)	2020	8	8	Part 4	
"Beautiful My Love" (Urban Zakapa)	2020	12	12	Part 5	
"In Front of City Hall at the Subway Station" (Kwak Jin-eon)	2020	55	27	Part 6	
"You Always" (J Rabbit)	2020	64	54	Part 7	
"With My Tears" (Wheein)	2020	18	13	Part 8	
"The Wind Is Blowing" (Lee So-ra)	2020	108	96	Part 9	
"Beyond the Rainbow Forest" (Park Hyuk-jin)	2020	116	82	Part 10	
"Oh! What a Shiny Night (Drama. Ver)" (Mido and Falasol)	2020	37	24	Part 10	
"Canon (Drama. Ver)" (Mido and Falasol)	2020	194	–	Part 10	
"While Living Life" (Oohyo)	2020	185	–	Part 11	
"I Knew I Love" (Jeon Mi-do)	2020	1	2	Part 11	
"Me to You, You to Me" (Mido and Falasol)	2020	6	5	Part 12	
Season 2
"Rain and You" (Lee Mu-jin)	2021	11	18	Part 1	
"In Front of the Post Office in Autumn" (Kim Dae-myung)	2021	27	35	Part 2	
"I Like You" (Jang Beom-june)	2021	36	36	Part 3	
"I Love You More Than Anyone" (Twice)	2021	105	75	Part 4	
"I Like You" (Jo Jung-suk)	2021	8	10	Part 5	
"Superstar" (Mido and Falasol)	2021	33	23	Part 6	
"Let's Forget It" (Mido and Falasol)	2021	47	36	OST Special	
"Already One Year" (Mido and Falasol)	2021	74	37	OST Special	
"To You" (Yoo Yeon-seok)	2021	73	54	Part 7	
"Is It Still Beautiful" (Seventeen)	2021	25	22	Part 8	
"Reminiscence" (Jung Kyung-ho)	2021	36	31	Part 9	
"It's My Life" (Yoon Mi-rae)	2021	94	—	Part 10	
"You Have A Crush On Me (Drama Ver.)" (Mido and Falasol)	2021	136	—	OST Special 2	
"Rain and You (Drama Ver.)" (Mido and Falasol)	2021	—	—	OST Special 2	
"I Like You (Drama Ver.)" (Mido and Falasol)	2021	—	—	OST Special 2	
"Running In The Sky" (Hynn)	2021	94	—	Part 11	
"Butterfly" (Jeon Mi-do)	2021	32	—	Part 12	
"Someday" (Mido and Falasol)	2021	85	—	Part 12	

== Reception ==
=== Critical response ===
Hospital Playlist received positive critical feedback. Comparing the series to Grey's Anatomy and Friends, Ariana Yaptangco of Elle featured it on the list of "The 10 Best K-Dramas To Binge-Watch On Netflix".

During an interview with The Korea Herald, film critic Yun Suk-jin praised Hospital Playlist for emphasizing the human aspect of the profession rather than the life-and-death situations, noting that the series "did away with the cliched power conflict, and focused on the doctors' sincerity in their work and their relationship with the patients." Pierce Conran of South China Morning Post named Hospital Playlist one of the best South Korean series of 2020, mentioning that "emotional tales of illness and grief play out against the gentle camaraderie of a group that finds solace from the hardships of their job in each other, and their delightfully lousy five-piece garage band." Jessicha Valentina of The Jakarta Post named Jeon Mi-do's character Chae Song-hwa "one of the series' highlights," praising Hospital Playlist for its portrayal of strong female characters.

Joel Keller of Decider gave a mixed review, saying that the series "is a bit of a strange amalgamation of different genres, but the cast makes it work. Just be ready for a slightly confusing first episode."

=== Cultural impact ===
Hospital Playlist has positive impact in bringing awareness of the importance of organ donation. The number of hopeful registrants for organ donation, which decreased significantly due to the COVID-19 pandemic in 2020, increased significantly in 2022 due to the effect of the 2021 drama, which warmly depicts various donation cases with various stories. According to the National Long-Term Tissue Haematological Management Centre on September 14, 2022, the number of registered applicants who wanted to donate organs, human tissues, and haematopoietic stem cells, which was 147,761 in 2019, decreased by 17,417 (11.8%) to a large number of confirmed cases of COVID-19 in Korea in 2020, but increase 35.7% to 178,871 in 2022.

=== Viewership ===
Season 1

Hospital Playlist aired on tvN, which normally has a relatively smaller audience compared to free-to-air TV/public broadcasters (KBS, SBS, MBC and EBS). Its first season ended within the top 10 of the highest-rated Korean dramas in cable television history.

Season 2

A 10.0% viewership rating was recorded nationwide for the first episode of the second season, making it the highest premiere rating of the network. The last episode, aired on September 16, recorded an average national viewership of 14.080%, which is the highest ratings of the season.

Hospital Playlist : South Korea viewers per episode (millions)

Season	Episode number												Average
Season	1	2	3	4	5	6	7	8	9	10	11	12	Average
1	1.698	2.050	2.382	2.476	3.064	3.082	3.247	3.332	3.126	3.277	3.463	3.579	2.898
2	2.629	2.494	2.876	2.857	3.338	3.573	2.920	3.433	3.470	3.342	3.649	3.853	3.203

Source: Audience measurement performed nationwide by Nielsen Korea.

==== Season 1 ====
Average TV viewership ratings (season 1)
Ep.	Original broadcast date	Average audience share (Nielsen Korea)	
Ep.	Original broadcast date	Nationwide	Seoul
1	March 12, 2020	6.325% (1st)	7.113% (1st)
2	March 19, 2020	7.750% (1st)	8.507% (1st)
3	March 26, 2020	8.556% (1st)	9.313% (1st)
4	April 2, 2020	9.754% (1st)	10.932% (1st)
5	April 9, 2020	11.321% (1st)	12.655% (1st)
6	April 16, 2020	11.682% (1st)	13.783% (1st)
7	April 23, 2020	12.077% (1st)	13.864% (1st)
8	April 30, 2020	12.008% (1st)	13.489% (1st)
9	May 7, 2020	12.134% (1st)	14.479% (1st)
10	May 14, 2020	12.701% (1st)	15.729% (1st)
11	May 21, 2020	13.125% (1st)	15.662% (1st)
12	May 28, 2020	14.142% (1st)	16.711% (1st)
Average		10.965%	12.686%
Special	June 4, 2020	5.909% (1st)	7.403% (1st)
In the table above, the blue numbers represent the lowest ratings and the red numbers represent the highest ratings.; This drama aired on a cable channel/pay TV which normally has a relatively smaller audience compared to free-to-air TV/public broadcasters (KBS, SBS, MBC and EBS).

==== Season 2 ====
Average TV viewership ratings (season 2)
Ep.	Original broadcast date	Average audience share (Nielsen Korea)	
Ep.	Original broadcast date	Nationwide	Seoul
1	June 17, 2021	10.007% (1st)	11.737% (1st)
2	June 24, 2021	10.071% (1st)	11.848% (1st)
3	July 1, 2021	10.604% (1st)	12.602% (1st)
4	July 8, 2021	10.972% (1st)	12.775% (1st)
5	July 15, 2021	12.399% (1st)	15.058% (1st)
6	July 22, 2021	13.151% (1st)	15.785% (1st)
7	August 5, 2021	10.643% (1st)	12.334% (1st)
8	August 12, 2021	13.120% (1st)	15.521% (1st)
9	August 19, 2021	12.892% (1st)	14.763% (1st)
10	August 26, 2021	12.704% (1st)	14.618% (1st)
11	September 9, 2021 (Note: Due to tvN broadcast of the Asian qualifier for the 2022 Qatar World Cup between Korea and Iraq on September 2, the episode 11 will be aired on September 9.)	13.387% (1st)	15.382% (1st)
12	September 16, 2021	14.080% (1st)	15.726% (1st)
Average		12.002%	14.012%
Special	July 29, 2021	6.128% (1st)	8.090% (1st)
Special	September 23, 2021	4.226% (1st)	4.594% (1st)
In the table above, the blue numbers represent the lowest ratings and the red numbers represent the highest ratings.; This drama aired on a cable channel/pay TV which normally has a relatively smaller audience compared to free-to-air TV/public broadcasters (KBS, SBS, MBC and EBS).

== Accolades ==
Hospital Playlist on year-end lists
Critic/Publication	List	Ref.
Joy News 24 (Note: Joy News 24, an entertainment economic magazine, conducted a survey from October 12 to 19 2021, about dramas, movies, actors, singers, and entertainment programs that shone in 2021 in celebration of its 17th anniversary. About 200 people in the industry participated in the survey, including executives at entertainment companies and broadcasting companies, producers of film and broadcast content, and reporters from the entertainment department. The results of the survey are presented by category.)	2021 Best Drama (1st rank)	
South China Morning Post	The top 10 K-dramas of 2020	
NME	Korean dramas of 2020: the good, the bad and the great	
Teen Vogue	11 Best K-Dramas of 2020	

Name of the award ceremony, year presented, category, nominee of the award, and the result of the nomination
Award ceremony	Year	Category	Nominee	Result	Ref.
APAN Star Awards	2021	Drama of the Year	Hospital Playlist	Nominated	
APAN Star Awards	2021	Top Excellence Award, Actor in a Miniseries	Jo Jung-suk	Nominated	
APAN Star Awards	2021	Best New Actress	Jeon Mi-do	Won	
APAN Star Awards	2021	Best New Actress	Ahn Eun-jin	Nominated	
APAN Star Awards	2022	Excellence Award, Actress in a Miniseries	Shin Hyun-been	Nominated	
Asia Artist Awards	2020	Best Acting Award	Jeon Mi-do	Won	
Asia Artist Awards	2020	AAA Focus Award	Ahn Eun-jin	Won	
Asia Contents Awards	2020	Best Writer	Lee Woo-jung	Nominated	
Asia Contents Awards	2020	Newcomer Actress	Jeon Mi-do	Won	
Baeksang Arts Awards	2020	Best New Actress	Jeon Mi-do	Nominated	
Baeksang Arts Awards	2020	Best Screenplay	Lee Woo-jung	Nominated	
Brand of the Year Awards	2020	Best Drama	Hospital Playlist	Won	
Brand of the Year Awards	2020	Best Actor	Jo Jung-suk	Won	
Brand of the Year Awards	2020	Best New Actress	Jeon Mi-do	Won	
Brand of the Year Awards	2020	Best OST	Jo Jung-suk — "Aroha"	Won	
Genie Music Awards	2021	Best OST	Jo Jung-suk — "Aroha"	Won	
Golden Disc Awards	2021	Best OST	Jo Jung-suk — "Aroha"	Won	
Melon Music Awards	2020	Best OST	Jo Jung-suk — "Aroha"	Won	
Melon Music Awards	2020	Best OST	Jeon Mi-do — "I Knew I Love"	Nominated	
Melon Music Awards	2021	Best OST	Lee Mu-jin — "Rain and You"	Won	
Mnet Asian Music Awards	2020	Best OST	Jo Jung-suk — "Aroha"	Nominated	
Mnet Asian Music Awards	2020	Best OST	Joy — "Introduce Me a Good Person"	Nominated	
Mnet Asian Music Awards	2020	Song of the Year	Jo Jung-suk — "Aroha"	Nominated	
Mnet Asian Music Awards	2020	Song of the Year	Joy — "Introduce Me a Good Person"	Nominated	
Mnet Asian Music Awards	2021	Best OST	Jo Jung-suk — "I Like You"	Won	
Mnet Asian Music Awards	2021	Best OST	Lee Mu-jin — "Rain and you"	Nominated	
Seoul Music Awards	2021	Best OST	Jo Jung-suk — "Aroha"	Won	
Seoul Music Awards	2021	Best OST	Joy – "Introduce Me a Good Person"	Nominated	
Seoul Music Awards	2021	Best OST	Jeon Mi-do — "I Knew I Love"	Nominated	
Seoul Music Awards	2021	Best OST	Kyuhyun – "Confession Is Not Flashy"	Nominated	
Seoul Music Awards	2021	Best OST	Urban Zakapa – "Beautiful My Love"	Nominated	
Seoul Music Awards	2021	Best OST	Wheein – "With My Tears"	Nominated	
