= Joy (singer) =

South Korean singer and actress (born 1996)

- Joy in 2026
- Born: Park Soo-young; September 3, 1996 (age 30); Jeju Province, South Korea
- Education: School of Performing Arts Seoul
- Occupations: Singer; actress
- Years active: 2014–present
- Musical career
- Genres: K-pop; retro
- Instrument: Vocals
- Label: SM
- Member of: Red Velvet; SM Town
- Website: Official website

Korean name
- Hangul: 박수영
- Hanja: 朴秀英
- RR: Bak Suyeong
- MR: Pak Suyŏng

Signature
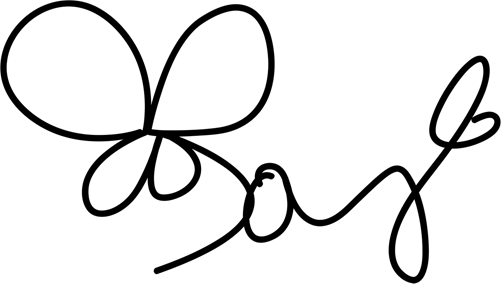

Park Soo-young (Korean: 박수영; born September 3, 1996), better known by her stage name Joy (조이), is a South Korean singer, actress, and host. She debuted as a member of South Korean girl group Red Velvet in August 2014. In 2017, Joy debuted as an actress and has had starring roles in the television dramas The Liar and His Lover (2017), Tempted (2018), The One and Only (2021), Once Upon a Small Town (2022), and One of a Kind Romance (2026). In 2021, Joy officially debuted as a soloist with the release of her special album Hello.

== Early life ==
Park Soo-young was born in Jeju Island and raised in Dobong, Seoul in South Korea. She is the eldest of three sisters. As a child, Joy was interested in modern trot music and was influenced to become a singer after receiving praise for her rendition of Korean rock band Cherry Filter's song "Flying Duck" during a grade school festival. Joy auditioned and was cast by SM Entertainment at the SM Global Audition in Seoul in 2012.

== Career ==
=== 2014–present: Debut and group activities ===
Following two years of training, a vocal coach gave her the stage name "Joy". Joy was officially introduced as the fourth member of Red Velvet on July 29, 2014. Joy was the only member of the group who was not introduced as a part of SM Rookies, a pre-debut training team created by SM Entertainment. Red Velvet made their debut in August 2014 with the digital single "Happiness". Over the course of their promotion, the group established themselves as one of the most powerful celebrities in South Korea by Forbes Korea Power Celebrity in 2018 and 2019, and gained global popularity with Billboard regarding them as one of the most popular K-pop groups worldwide.

=== 2015–2020: Solo activities ===
In June 2015, Joy began her first solo television activity with the fourth season of MBC variety show We Got Married, where she was paired with BtoB member Yook Sung-jae. Joy gained recognition for her participation and won the New Star Award and Best Couple Award at the 2015 MBC Entertainment Awards. Joy also released a duet with Yook entitled "Young Love" in April 2016, with Joy receiving a songwriting credit for the song. Departing in May 2016, they became known as one of the longest-running and most popular couples in the show's history.

In November 2016, Joy collaborated with Lim Seul-ong in a duet titled "Always In My Heart". The song reached number one on several charts and number ten on the Gaon Digital Chart.

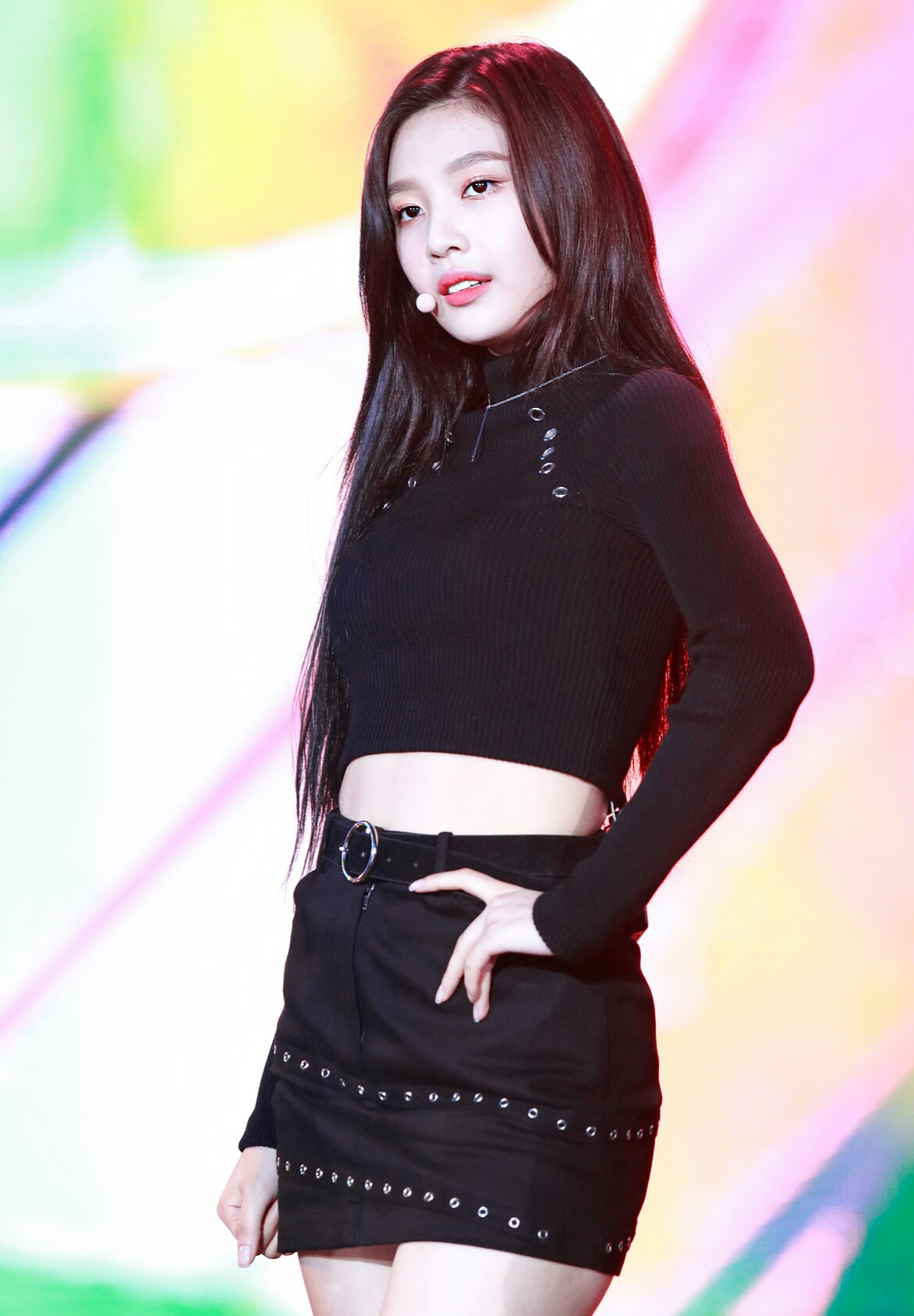
Joy at the Korea Music Festival in 2017

In 2017, Joy made her acting debut as the female lead in tvN's music-based drama The Liar and His Lover, a South Korean adaptation of Kotomi Aoki's popular manga Kanojo wa Uso o Aishisugiteru. With the drama's musical nature, Joy released several OSTs including: "Yeowooya", "I'm Okay", "Your Days", "Shiny Boy", "Waiting For You", and "The Way to Me". For her performance as lead actress, Joy received the Newcomer Award at the OSEN Cable TV Awards. In July 2017, Joy participated on the singing variety contest show King of Mask Singer under the alias of Bandabi, where she made it through to the next round of the competition.

In 2018, Joy began her first fixed hosting position as the co-host of the second season of JTBC's Sugar Man alongside top TV personalities Yoo Jae-suk, You Hee-yeol, and Park Na-rae. In 2018, Joy starred in MBC's drama Tempted, loosely based on the French novel Les Liaisons dangereuses, and recorded its OST "OMG!". Joy received numerous award nominations for her performance including: Best Actress at the 2018 MBC Drama Awards, the Popularity Award (Drama Actress) at The Seoul Awards, and the Actress of the Year Daesang at the Brand of the Year Awards. In July 2018, Joy was chosen as one of the hosts of Lifetime's new variety show Pajama Friends, alongside Song Ji-hyo and Jang Yoon-ju. Later that year in October 2018, Joy released the soundtrack song "Dream Me" (with Mark Lee) for the KBS drama The Ghost Detective.

In January 2019, it was announced that Joy was chosen to be a main host of the popular beauty program OnStyle's Get It Beauty, with former Pajama Friends co-host, Jang Yoon-ju. In December 2019, Joy became part of the athletic variety show, Handsome Tigers, as the manager of Seo Jang-hoon's basketball team composed of celebrities such as Lee Sang-yoon and Cha Eun-woo. After positive response in variety shows, Joy won the Best Female Variety Idol Daesang at the 2020 Brand Customer Loyalty Awards.

In March 2020, Joy released her solo OST "Introduce Me a Good Person" for the soundtrack of tvN's drama Hospital Playlist. The song reached number one on multiple charts, number five on the Billboard K-Pop Hot 100 Chart, number six on the Gaon Digital Chart, surpassed 500 Million Digital Index Points on Gaon, and has been certified platinum for streaming by the KMCA. "Introduce Me a Good Person" went on to be nominated for the Song of the Year Daesang and Best OST Award at the Mnet Asian Music Awards, and Best OST at the 30th Seoul Music Awards. Joy was also nominated as a soloist for the Top 10 Artist of the Year Bonsang (Main Prize) at the 2020 Melon Music Awards, and Artist of the Year Daesang at the 2020 Genie Music Awards. In May 2020, Joy featured on the lead single of R&B artist Crush, with "Mayday" topping the charts on several Korean music platforms.

=== 2021–present: Solo debut, return to acting, and rising popularity ===
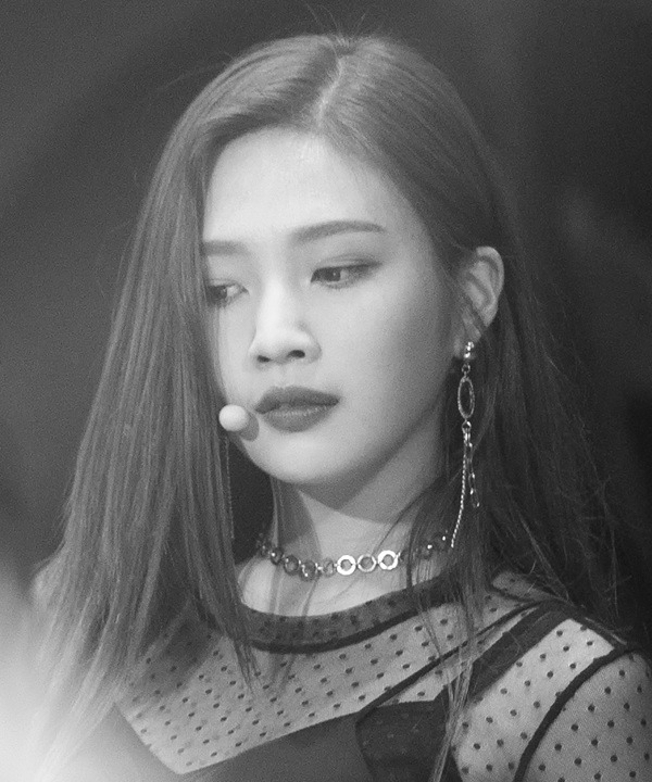
Joy in 2018

On May 12, 2021, it was announced that Joy would make her official solo debut with a special album consisting of 6 remake songs from the 1990s to 2000s. Joy's extended play Hello was released on May 31, with the title track reaching number one on multiple charts and the album recording number one on the iTunes Top Album charts of 26 countries. All 6 tracks from the album debuted on the Gaon Digital Chart, with Joy also reaching number one as a soloist on the Melon Female Solo Artist Chart. Joy's title track "Hello" also reached the Top 10 of Billboard's K-Pop Hot 100, with 5 tracks in total from her solo debut album also entering the chart. On November 8, 2021, Joy's solo debut album Hello was nominated for the Album of the Year Daesang (Grand Prize) at the 2021 Melon Music Awards. Joy was also nominated as a soloist for the second consecutive year for the MMA Top 10 Artist Bonsang (Main Prize). On November 27, 2021, Joy was nominated for Artist of the Year (Digital Music - May) at the Gaon Music Awards. In December, Joy was also nominated for the Best Digital Song Bonsang at the 36th Golden Disc Awards, and the Main Award (Bonsang) at the 31st Seoul Music Awards. In addition, NME listed Joy's "Hello" as one of the Top 25 Best K-pop songs of 2021.

On December 20, 2021, Joy made her return to acting in the JTBC drama The One and Only. In 2022, Joy was nominated for the Best Actress Idol Daesang and Best Variety Idol Daesang at the 2022 Brand Customer Loyalty Awards. On May 26, 2022, it was announced that Joy would star in KakaoTV's original drama Once Upon a Small Town, which premiered worldwide on Netflix on September 5, 2022, and went on to reach the Netflix Top 10 in 33 countries. In June 2023, Joy was nominated for Best Actress, Best New Actress, and the Popular Star Award at the Blue Dragon Series Awards.

Despite initial reports that she would be departing SM Entertainment, Joy renewed her contract with the company in January 2025, making her the third member of Red Velvet to renew with SM after Seulgi and Irene. On July 28, it was announced that Joy would be releasing her first extended play From Joy, with Love on August 18, with the lead single "Love Splash!". On October 3, 2025, Joy held her first fanmeeting "Unmelting Our Green" in Seoul. In February 2026, Joy announced her first live concert tour in Asia, Joy Splash, with dates in Taipei, Hong Kong, Bangkok, and Kuala Lumpur.

In 2025, Joy became a cast member of the entertainment program I Live Alone. On September 30, 2025, Joy was cast as the female lead in the television series One of a Kind Romance, set to air in November 2026. In August 2026, it was confirmed that Joy would take part as the main voice actress for the Korean release of the animated film Stitch Head. Joy stated about her role: "I was charmed by Arabella's courage to open her heart without prejudice and help her friends. I worked joyfully to convey warmth and a positive message".

== Public image ==
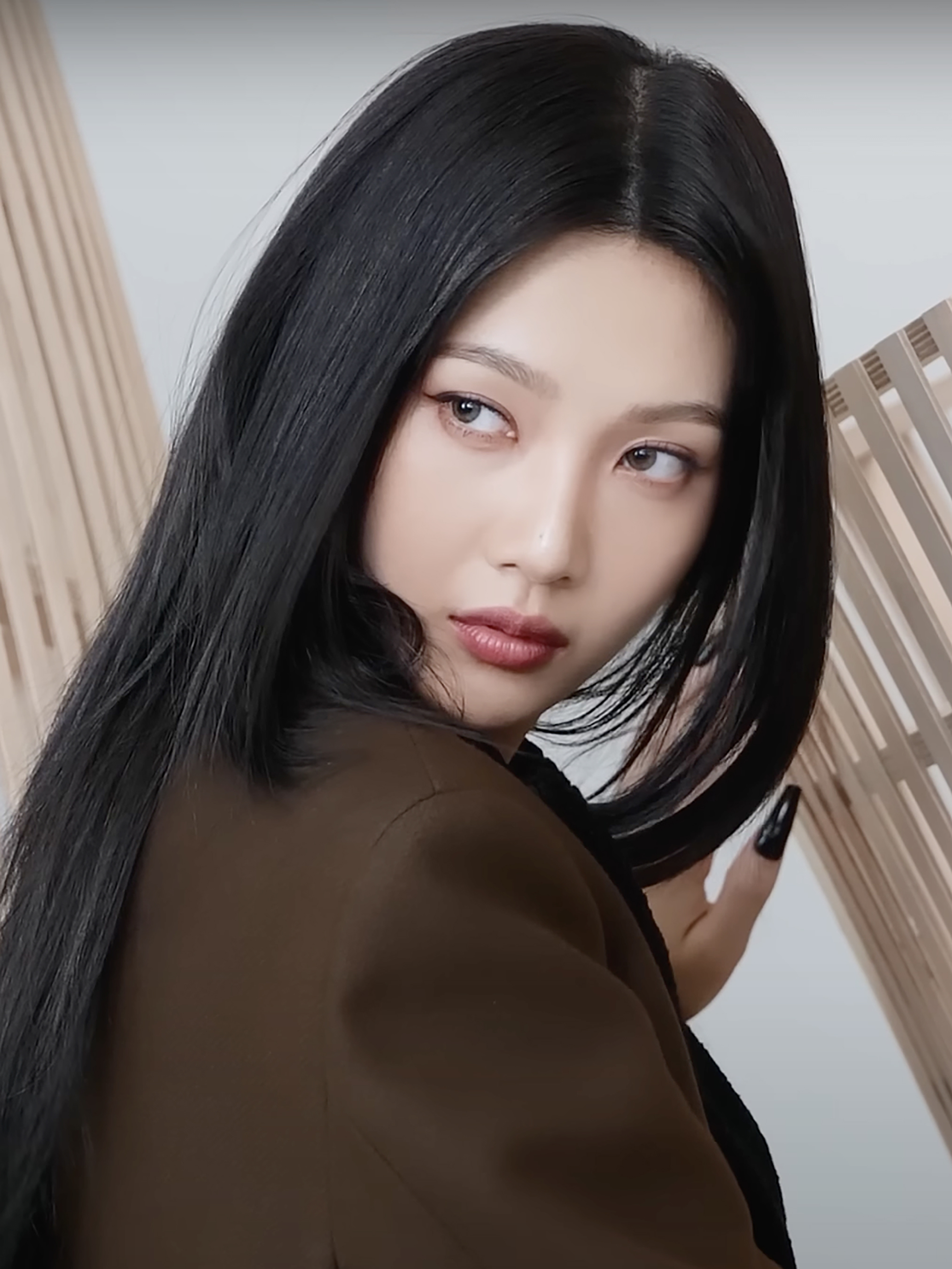
Joy for Marie Claire Korea in 2022

In 2019, Joy ranked in Gallup Korea's annual data list of the "Top 20 Most Popular Idols". In another survey conducted among soldiers doing mandatory military service in South Korea, Joy was ranked in the Top 5 most popular female K-pop idols. In their annual list, K-pop Radar also confirmed that Joy's Instagram account _imyour_joy had the most Instagram followers out of K-pop female artists who opened their account in 2019. Joy has also ranked first several times in the "Individual Girl Group Members Brand Power Ranking" published by the Korean Corporate Reputation Research Institute.

In February 2020, Joy was invited to attend New York Fashion Week as a VIP guest of Michael Kors, with Vogue calling Joy "one of K-pop's brightest stars".

As a singer, Joy's voice has received praise from various producers and musicians including composer Hwang Hyun, singer-songwriter You Hee-yeol, and producer Ma Joo-hee. In 2020, Joy became the first SM female artist without a solo debut to receive a Bonsang (Main Prize) nomination. In 2021, Joy became the first SM female soloist to be nominated for the Album of the Year Daesang (Grand Prize) at the Melon Music Awards.

== Other ventures ==
=== Endorsements ===
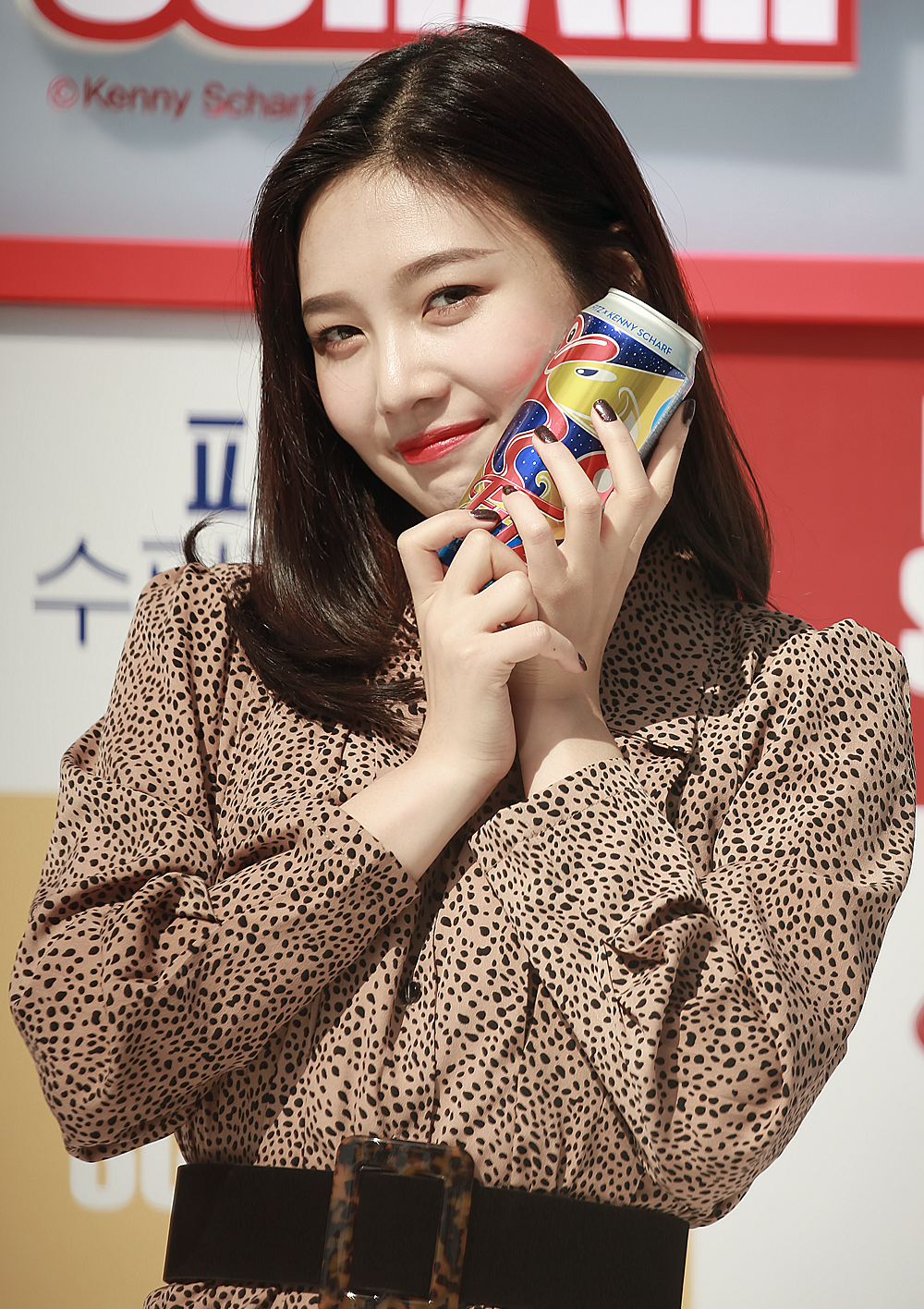
Joy at the Lotte Fitz x Kennyscharf collaboration event in 2018

Joy is an in-demand endorser in South Korea, with numerous brand deals.

In July 2018, Joy was named as the new model and endorser for Lotte's Fitz beer. In May 2019, eSpoir of South Korea's leading cosmetics conglomerate Amore Pacific, chose Joy as their official muse for their makeup and skincare products.

In 2020, Joy became the face of Aveda South Korea, owned by Estée Lauder, with the brand citing Joy's positive image across various fields.

In February 2021, Joy became a muse of Tod's Italian luxury brand, Hogan, and was later officially announced as the new ambassador for Tod's in Korea on August 13, 2021. In September 2021, Joy became the face and model for Calvin Klein's latest campaign in Korea.

In January 2022, Joy was named as a muse of Calvin Klein. In February 2022, Joy became the exclusive model of premium vegan beauty brand, Athé. In March 2022, Joy was announced as the new endorser of Lacto-Joy health products. In July 2022, Joy was chosen as the first exclusive model for Alachi Chicken, with the brand stating that Joy was selected for her lively charm and luxurious image.

In March 2023, Joy became the new exclusive model for sportswear brand Barrel, with Joy praised as "a fashion icon who is bright and cheerful yet has a stylish image". In July 2023, Joy was officially selected as the new global brand ambassador for Fresh Beauty, under LVMH. The CEO Anne Collinet stated that Joy was chosen because "her sincere attitude towards life and her beautiful authenticity fascinates people".

In May 2025, Joy was announced as the new brand ambassador of Taiwanese supplement company Better Bioscience.

In March 2026, Joy partnered with Korean cosmetic brand Too Cool For School and appeared on the cover of Allure Korea.

=== Philanthropy ===
In February 2020, Joy donated 10 million won to the Community Chest of Korea to help support those affected by the COVID-19 pandemic in South Korea.

In April 2020, Joy next participated alongside prominent Korean artists in the multi-collaboration project "Evergreen Tree" to support medical professionals during the COVID-19 pandemic.

On October 21, 2022, Joy and Wonstein released the single "Love Song" as part of the "World Peace Project", with proceeds donated to UNICEF Korea.

== Personal life ==
In February 2015, Joy graduated from School of Performing Arts Seoul.

As of 2021, Joy has been in a relationship with R&B singer-songwriter Crush. The pair began dating after working together on Crush's 2020 single "Mayday".

== Discography ==
=== Extended plays ===
List of EPs, showing selected details, selected chart positions, and sales figures
Title	Details	Peak chart positions		Sales
Title	Details	KOR	JPN	Sales
Hello	Released: May 31, 2021; Label: SM Entertainment, Dreamus; Formats: CD, LP, cassette, digital download, streaming	4	31	KOR: 151,153; JPN: 2,363 (Phy.)
From Joy, with Love	Released: August 18, 2025; Label: SM Entertainment, Kakao; Formats: CD, LP, digital download, streaming	4	—	KOR: 84,719

=== Singles ===
List of singles, showing year released, selected peak positions, sales figures, and name of the album
Title	Year	Peak chart positions		Sales	Album
Title	Year	KOR	KOR Hot	Sales	Album
As lead artist
"Je T'aime"	2021	55	21	—N/a	Hello
"Hello" (안녕)	2021	10	10	—N/a	Hello
"Love Splash!"	2025	157	—	—N/a	From Joy, with Love
As featured artist
"Mayday" (자나깨나) (Crush featuring Joy)	2020	32	18	—N/a	homemade 1
Promotional
"First Christmas" (with Doyoung)	2016	— (Note: "First Christmas" did not enter the Gaon Digital Chart, but peaked at number 80 on the Gaon Download Chart.)	—	KOR: 19,622	Non-album single
Collaborations
"Always in My Heart" (이별을 배웠어) (with Lim Seul-ong)	2016	10	—	KOR: 415,334	SM Station Season 1
"Young Love" (어린애(愛)) (with Yook Sung-jae)	2016	52	—	KOR: 80,305	Non-album single
"Love Song" (with Wonstein)	2022	— (Note: "Love Song" did not enter the Gaon Digital Chart, but peaked at number 54 on the Gaon Download Chart.)	—	—N/a	World Peace Project
"Blue Night Song" (푸른 밤 이 노래) (with Ha Dong-kyun)	2023	154	—	—N/a	Non-album single
"—" denotes releases that did not chart or were not released in that region.

=== Soundtrack appearances ===
List of soundtrack appearances, showing year released, selected peak positions, sales figures, and name of the album
Title	Year	Peak chart positions		Sales	Album
Title	Year	KOR	KOR Hot	Sales	Album
"Yeowooya" (여우야)	2017	43	—	KOR: 81,837	The Liar and His Lover OST
"I'm Okay" (괜찮아, 난) (featuring Lee Hyun-woo)	2017	85	—	KOR: 22,513	The Liar and His Lover OST
"Your Days" (요즘 너 말야)	2017	— (Note: "Your Days" did not enter the Gaon Digital Chart, but peaked at number 38 and 75 on the Gaon BGM Chart and the Gaon Download Chart, respectively.)	—	KOR: 20,903	The Liar and His Lover OST
"Shiny Boy"	2017	— (Note: "Shiny Boy" did not enter the Gaon Digital Chart, but peaked at number 68 on the Gaon BGM Chart.)	—	—N/a	The Liar and His Lover OST
"Waiting for You" (너를 기다리는 법)	2017	— (Note: "Your Days" did not enter the Gaon Digital Chart, but peaked at number 33 on the Gaon BGM Chart.)	—	—N/a	The Liar and His Lover OST
"The Way to Me" (내게 오는 길)	2017	— (Note: "The Way to Me" did not enter the Gaon Digital Chart, but peaked at number 6 and 95 on the Gaon BGM Chart and the Gaon Download Chart, respectively.)	—	KOR: 15,726	The Liar and His Lover OST
"OMG! " (말도 안돼)	2018	—	—	—N/a	Tempted OST
"Dream Me" (나라는 꿈) (with Mark)	2018	— (Note: "Dream Me" did not enter the Gaon Digital Chart, but peaked at number 6 on the Gaon BGM Chart.)	—	—N/a	The Ghost Detective OST
"Introduce Me a Good Person" (좋은 사람 있으면 소개시켜줘)	2020	6	5	—N/a	Hospital Playlist OST
"Why Isn't Love Always Easy?" (왜 사랑은 언제나 쉽지 않을까?)	2021	110	—	—N/a	Romance 101 OST
"Your Name" (감정의 이름)	2022	— (Note: "Your Name" did not enter the Gaon Digital Chart, but peaked at number 51 and 65 on the Gaon BGM Chart and the Gaon Download Chart, respectively.)	—	—N/a	The One and Only OST
"My Lips Like Warm Coffee" (내 입술 따뜻한 커피처럼) (with Big Naughty)	2024	121	—	—N/a	The Last 10 Years OST
"—" denotes releases that did not chart or were not released in that region.

=== Other charted songs ===
List of other charted songs, showing year released, selected peak positions, and name of the album
Title	Year	Peak chart positions		Album
Title	Year	KOR	KOR Hot	Album
"If Only" (좋을텐데) (featuring Paul Kim)	2021	69	38	Hello
"Day by Day"	2021	108	99	Hello
"Happy Birthday to You"	2021	110	—	Hello
"Be There for You"	2021	113	99	Hello
"Get Up And Dance"	2025	— (Note: "Get Up And Dance" did not enter the Circle Digital Chart, but peaked at number 80 on the Download Chart.)	—	From Joy, With Love
"La Vie En Bleu"	2025	— (Note: "La Vie En Bleu" did not enter the Circle Digital Chart, but peaked at number 84 on the Download Chart.)	—	From Joy, With Love
"Unwritten Page"	2025	— (Note: "Unwritten Page" did not enter the Circle Digital Chart, but peaked at number 81 on the Download Chart.)	—	From Joy, With Love
"Scent Of Green"	2025	— (Note: "Scent Of Green" did not enter the Circle Digital Chart, but peaked at number 79 on the Download Chart.)	—	From Joy, With Love
"Cuddle"	2025	— (Note: "Cuddle" did not enter the Circle Digital Chart, but peaked at number 85 on the Download Chart.)	—	From Joy, With Love

=== Composition credits ===
All song credits are adapted from the Korea Music Copyright Association's database unless stated otherwise.

List of songs, showing year released, artist name, and name of the album
Title	Year	Artist(s)	Album	Notes	Ref.
"Young Love"	2016	Joy and Yook Sung-jae	Non-album single	As lyricist	
"Get Up and Dance"	2025	Joy	From Joy, with Love	As lyricist	—
"Unwritten Page"	2025	Joy	From Joy, with Love	As lyricist	—
"Surfin' Boy"	2026	Red Velvet	Velvet Summer	As lyricist	
"Hawaii"	2026	Red Velvet	Velvet Summer	As lyricist	

== Videography ==
=== Music videos ===
Title	Year	Ref.
"Yeowooya" (OST of The Liar and His Lover)	2017	
"Your Days" (OST of The Liar and His Lover)	2017	
"Waiting For You" (OST of The Liar and His Lover)	2017	
"Introduce Me A Good Person" (OST of Hospital Playlist)	2020	
"Hello"	2021	
"Love Splash!"	2025	
Collaborations
"Young Love" (with Yook Sung-jae)	2016	
"Always In My Heart" (with Lim Seul-ong)	2016	
"I'm Okay" (with Lee Hyun-woo, OST of The Liar and His Lover)	2017	
"Sangnoksu 2020" (with various artists)	2020	
As featured artist
"Mayday" (Crush feat. Joy)	2020	

== Filmography ==
=== Film ===
Year	Title	Role	Notes	Ref.
2015	SMTown: The Stage	Herself	Documentary film	
2020	Trolls World Tour	Ari (voice)	Animated film	
2026	Stitch Head	Arabella (voice)	Animated film	

=== Television series ===
Key
†	Denotes television productions that have not yet been released

Year	Title	Role	Notes	Ref.
2016	Descendants of the Sun	Herself	Cameo (Episode 16)	
2017	The Liar and His Lover	Yoon So-rim	Lead role	
2018	Tempted	Eun Tae-hee	Lead role	
2021–2022	The One and Only	Seong Mi-do	Lead role	
2026	One-of-a-Kind Romance †	Gong Yu-il	Lead role	

=== Web series ===
Year	Title	Role	Notes	Ref.
2017	The Boy Next Door	Herself	Cameo (Episode 7–8)	
2022	Once Upon a Small Town	Ahn Ja-yeong	Lead role	

=== Television show ===
Year	Title	Role	Notes	Ref.
2015	Immortal Songs	Contestant	With Seulgi and Wendy (Episode 223–224)	
2015–2016	We Got Married	Cast member	Paired up with Yook Sung-jae	
2016	Girl Group Battle	Contestant	With Seulgi and Wendy (Korean New Year Special)	
2016–2017	Trick & True	Panelist	With Jun Hyung-moo (Episode 5–16)	
2017	Oppa Thinking	Cast member	Pilot episode (2 episodes)	
2017	King of Mask Singer	Contestant	As "Bandabi" (Episode 121–122)	
2018	Sugar Man 2	Host	With Yoo Jae-suk, Yoo Hee-yeol, Park Na-rae	
2018	Pajama Friends	Host	With Jang Yoon-ju, Song Ji-hyo	
2019	Get It Beauty 2019	Host	With Jang Yoon-ju (Episode 7–40)	
2020	Handsome Tigers	Cast member	With Lee Sang-yoon, Cha Eun-woo, Seo Jang-hoon	
2021–present	Animal Farm	Host	With Shin Dong-yup	
2025–present	I Live Alone	Cast member	Episode 591–present	

== Concerts and tours ==
=== Headlining ===
- Joy Splash (2026)

== Awards and nominations ==
Name of the award ceremony, year presented, category, nominee of the award, and the result of the nomination
Award ceremony	Year	Category	Nominee(s) / Work(s)	Result	Ref.
APAN Music Awards	2020	Best OST	"Introduce Me A Good Person"	Nominated	
Blue Dragon Series Awards	2023	Best Actress	Once Upon A Small Town	Nominated	
Blue Dragon Series Awards	2023	Best New Actress	Once Upon A Small Town	Nominated	
Blue Dragon Series Awards	2023	Popular Star Award	Once Upon A Small Town	Nominated	
Brand Customer Loyalty Awards	2020	Best Female Variety Idol	Get It Beauty and Handsome Tigers	Won	
Brand Customer Loyalty Awards	2022	Best Actress Idol	The One and Only	Nominated	
Brand Customer Loyalty Awards	2022	Best Variety Idol	TV Animal Farm	Nominated	
Brand of the Year Awards	2018	Actress of the Year	Tempted	Nominated	
Brand of the Year Awards	2019	Beauty Icon of the Year	Joy	Nominated	
Brand of the Year Awards	2020	OST of the Year	"Introduce Me A Good Person"	Nominated	
Gaon Chart Music Awards	2022	Artist of the Year (Digital Music – May)	"Hello"	Nominated	
Genie Music Awards	2020	Artist of the Year (Daesang)	Joy	Nominated	
Golden Disc Awards	2022	Best Digital Song (Bonsang)	"Hello"	Nominated	
Golden Disc Awards	2022	Seezn Most Popular Artist Award	Joy	Nominated	
Hanteo Music Awards	2021	Artist Award – Female Solo	Joy	Nominated	
Korea First Brand Awards	2019	Beauty Icon	Joy	Nominated	
MBC Drama Awards	2018	Best Actress, Excellence Award	Tempted	Nominated	
MBC Drama Awards	2018	Best New Actress	Tempted	Nominated	
MBC Entertainment Awards	2015	Best Couple Award	Joy (with Yook Sung-jae) in We Got Married	Won	
MBC Entertainment Awards	2015	New Star Award	We Got Married	Won	
MBC Entertainment Awards	2015	Best Newcomer Award	We Got Married	Nominated	
Melon Music Awards	2020	Top 10 Artist (Bonsang)	Joy	Nominated	
Melon Music Awards	2021	Album of the Year (Daesang)	Hello	Nominated	
Melon Music Awards	2021	Top 10 Artist (Bonsang)	Joy	Nominated	
Mnet Asian Music Awards	2020	Song of the Year (Daesang)	"Introduce Me A Good Person"	Nominated	
Mnet Asian Music Awards	2020	Best OST	"Introduce Me A Good Person"	Nominated	
OSEN Cable TV Awards	2017	Newcomer Award	The Liar and His Lover	Won	
Seoul Music Awards	2021	Best OST	"Introduce Me A Good Person"	Nominated	
Seoul Music Awards	2022	Main Award (Bonsang)	Joy	Nominated	
Seoul Music Awards	2022	K-wave Popularity Award	Joy	Nominated	
Seoul Music Awards	2022	Popularity Award	Joy	Nominated	
Soompi Awards	2019	Best Idol Actor	Tempted	Nominated	
The Seoul Awards	2018	Popularity Award (Drama Actress Category)	Tempted	Nominated	
