= Hello (Joy song) =

2021 single by Joy

Single by Joy

from the album Hello
- Released: May 31, 2021
- Genre: Rock
- Length: 3:38
- Label: SM; Dreamus
- Composer: Kang Hyun-min
- Lyricists: Park Hye-kyung; Kang Hyun-min; Park Ji-won

Joy singles chronology
"Je T'aime" (2021)	"Hello" (2021)	"Love Splash!" (2025)

Music video
- "Hello" on YouTube

"Hello" (Korean: 안녕; RR: Annyeong) is a song recorded by South Korean singer and Red Velvet member Joy. It is a cover of a song co-written and recorded by singer Park Hye-kyung in 2003. The song was released on May 31, 2021, by SM Entertainment as a title track from her special remake album of the same name. Composed by Kang Hyun-min and co-written by him with Park Hye-kyung and Park Ji-won, the track was described as a modern rock genre song, with lyrics about forgetting the hard days and celebrating a new day. The song peaked at position 10 on the Gaon Digital Chart and Billboard K-Pop Hot 100.

== Background and composition ==
"Hello"
"Hello" is a modern rock genre song that conveys a message of forgetting about the hard days and celebrating a new day.

SM Entertainment revealed that Joy will be releasing "Hello" as the title track for her special album of the same name at 6:00 PM of May 31, 2021. It was reported that starting from the title song, mood samplers and track posters for each song in the album will be released sequentially. The track is a remake of the same name released by singer Park Hye-kyung in 2003.

"Hello" was composed by Kang Hyun-min, while the lyrics were also written by him along with Park Hye-kyung and Park Ji-won. Musically, it was described as a modern rock genre song. The track is noted for its "speedy arrangement of cheerful brass music", in which was described as "enough to feel a different charm" from the original song. Moreover, Joy is praised on the track for her "cool vocals". The song is composed in the key of D major with a tempo of 93 beats per minute. Lyrically, it is described as "hopeful" as it conveys a message of forgetting about the hard days and celebrating a new day.

== Commercial performance ==
The track debuted at position 16 on the 23nd weekly issue of South Korea's Gaon Digital Chart for 2021 during the period dated May 30 – June 5. It charted at position 11 on the following week with chart issue dated May 30 – June 5. The following week, it peaked at position 10. The song also debuted and peaked at position six on the component Download Chart. It also debuted at position 24 on the component Streaming Chart and peaked at position 13. In addition, it debuted at position 26 on the component BGM chart. The song entered the Billboard K-Pop Hot 100 at position 43 on the chart issue dated June 12, 2021, and peaked at position 10 two weeks later.

== Credits and personnel ==
Credits adapted from the liner notes of Hello.

Studio

- Recorded, edited, and engineered for mix at SM Big Shot Studio
- Recorded at Prelude Studio
- Recorded at Seoul Studio
- Mixed at SM Blue Cup Studio
- Mastered at 821 Sound Mastering

Personnel

- Joy – vocals
- Park Hye-kyung – songwriting
- Kang Hyun-min – songwriting, composition
- Park Ji-won – songwriting
- Kenzie – arrangement, vocal directing, piano
- Choi Hoon – bass
- Hong Joon-ho – guitar
- Nile Lee – brass, conducting
- Kim Sang-il – saxophone
- Kim Soo-hwan – saxophone
- Kim Dong-ha – trumpet
- Lee Dong-ki – trumpet
- Lee Han-jin – trombone
- Yoo Dong-wan – trombone
- Lee Min-kyu – recording, digital editing, mixing engineer
- Lee Chang-sun – recording
- Jung Ki-hong – recording
- Choi Da-in – recording assistant
- Jeong Eui-seok – mixing
- Kwon Nam-woo – mastering

== Charts ==
=== Weekly charts ===
Weekly chart performance for "Hello"
Chart (2021)	Peak position
South Korea (Gaon)	10
South Korea (K-pop Hot 100)	10

=== Monthly charts ===
Monthly chart performance for "Hello"
Chart (2021)	Peak position
South Korea (Gaon)	11
South Korea (K-pop Hot 100)	14

=== Year-end charts ===
Year-end chart performance for "Hello"
Chart (2021)	Position
South Korea (Gaon)	72

== Accolades ==
=== Awards and nominations ===
Name of the award ceremony, year presented, category, and the result of the nomination
Ceremony	Year	Award	Result	Ref.
Gaon Chart Music Awards	2022	Artist of the Year (Digital Music) – May	Nominated	
Golden Disc Awards	2022	Digital Song Bonsang	Nominated	

=== Lists ===
Name of publisher, year listed, name of listicle, and placement
Publisher	List	Placement	Ref.
NME	The 25 best K-Pop songs of 2021	20th	

== Release history ==
Release dates and formats for "Hello"
Region	Date	Format(s)	Label(s)	Ref.
Various	May 31, 2021	Digital download; streaming	SM; Dreamus	
