= Day by Day (Joy song) =

2021 song by Joy

Song by Joy

from the album Hello
- Language: Korean
- Released: May 31, 2021
- Studio: SM Yellow Tail Studio
- Genre: R&B
- Length: 4:10
- Label: SM; Dreamus
- Composer(s): Shim Sang-won
- Lyricist(s): Yoon Sa-rah

Audio video
- "Day by Day" on YouTube

"Day by Day" is a remake song recorded by South Korean singer and Red Velvet member Joy. Originally recorded and released by female duo As One in 1999, the song was re-recorded and was released on May 31, 2021, by SM Entertainment as a track from her special remake album, Hello. Composed by Shim Sang-won and written by Yoon Sa-rah, it is an emotional medium tempo R&B ballad song. The track is about expressing courage little by little to people who have been by her side for a long time. The song debuted at position 108 on South Korea's Gaon Digital Chart and charted at position 99 on the Billboard K-Pop 100.

== Background and composition ==
SM Entertainment revealed that Joy will be releasing "Day by Day" for her special album Hello at 6:00 PM of May 31, 2021. It was reported that a mood sampler, a track posters, and a teaser image for the song was released on the midnight of May 23. The track is a remake of the same name released by female duo As One in 1999.

"Day by Day" was composed by Shim Sang-won and was written by Yoon Sa-rah. Musically, it was described as an emotional medium tempo R&B ballad song. The track was noted for its "groovy" bass rhythm. The song is composed in the key of E major with a tempo of 126 beats per minute. Lyrically, it expresses one's desire to be brave and approach the people who have been around for a long time. The lyrics is described as a track with a "lyrical episode sound" as it "stimulates emotion".

== Promotion and reception ==
On June 4, 2021, Joy performed "Day by Day" on Yoo Hee-yeol's Sketchbook. The song debuted at number 108 on the 23nd weekly issue of South Korea's Gaon Digital Chart for 2021 during the period dated May 30 – June 5. The track also debuted at position 22 and position and number 117 on the Gaon Download Chart and Gaon Streaming Chart, respectively. The song entered the Billboard K-Pop 100 at position 99 on the chart issue dated June 19, 2021.

== Credits and personnel ==
Credits adapted from the liner notes of Hello.

Studio

- Recorded at SM Yellow Tail Studio
- Engineered for mix at SM Lvyin Studio
- Mixed at SM Blue Cup Studio
- Mastered at 821 Sound Mastering

Personnel

- Joy – vocals, background vocals
- Yoon Sa-rah – lyrics
- Shim Sang-won – composition
- minGtion – arrangement, vocal directing, bass, piano, digital editing
- Park Shin-won – guitar
- Lee So-jeong – background vocals
- No Min-ji – recording
- Lee Ji-hong – mixing engineer
- Jeong Eui-seok – mixing
- Kwon Nam-woo – mastering

== Charts ==
Weekly chart performance for "Day by Day"
Chart (2021)	Peak position
South Korea (Gaon)	108
South Korea (K-pop Hot 100)	99

== Release history ==
Release dates and formats for "Day by Day"
Region	Date	Format(s)	Label(s)	Ref.
Various	May 31, 2021	Digital download; streaming	SM Entertainment; Dreamus	
