= Introduce Me a Good Person =

2020 single by Joy

Single by Joy

from the album Hospital Playlist (Original Television Soundtrack)
- Language: Korean
- Released: March 20, 2020
- Studio: SM Lvyin Studio
- Length: 3:03
- Label: Studio MaumC; EggIsComing; Stone Music Entertainment
- Composer: Jung Jae-hyung
- Lyricist: Kim Hee-tam

Joy singles chronology
| "Dream Me" (2018) | "Introduce Me a Good Person" (2020) | "Why Isn't Love Always Easy?" (2021) |

Music video
- "Introduce Me a Good Person" on YouTube

"Introduce Me a Good Person" (Korean: 좋은 사람 있으면 소개시켜줘; RR: Joeun saram isseumyeon sogaesikyeojwo) is a remake song recorded by South Korean singer and Red Velvet member Joy for the soundtrack of the 2020 drama series Hospital Playlist. Originally recorded and released by Basis in 1996, the song was re-recorded and was released on March 20, 2020, by Studio MaumC, EggIsComing, and Stone Music Entertainment. Composed by Jung Jae-hyung and written by Kim Hee-tam, the song was noted for its rhythmical and acoustic elements. The song peaked at position six on South Korea's Gaon Digital Chart and peaked at position five on the Billboard K-Pop 100.

== Background and composition ==
According to Studio MaumC, Joy will be participating at the soundtrack for the drama series Hospital Playlist, revealing "Introduce Me a Good Person" would be released at noon of March 20, 2020. The song is a remake of the same name released by Basis in 1996. It was noted that the track would be "reborn as a more cheerful song in about 24 years" with Joy's "refreshing voice".

"Introduce Me a Good Person"
"Introduce Me a Good Person" is a song that is noted for its "rhythmical and acoustic elements".

"Introduce Me a Good Person" was composed by Jung Jae-hyung, while the lyrics were written by Kim Hee-tam. The arrangement was performed by two-member production team Lundi Blues. It was reported that the remake version "maximized" the rhythm and melody of the original song as it was "loved by the public in the past". The track is noted for its rhythmical and acoustic elements that add to Joy's "clear vocal tone". The song is composed in the key of E-flat major with a tempo of 94 beats per minute. The lyrics is noted for being "lovely" that has been enhanced by Joy's "clear and refreshing voice".

== Promotion and reception ==
The music video for "Introduce Me a Good Person" was released on March 20, 2020. On September 4, 2020, Joy performed the song on Yoo Hee-yeol's Sketchbook.

"Introduce Me a Good Person" debuted at position 143 on the 12th weekly issue of South Korea's Gaon Digital Chart for 2020 during the period dated March 15–21. It peaked at position six on the 21st weekly issue of the chart. The song also debuted at position 32 on the component Download Chart and peaked at position 11. It also debuted at position 196 on the component Streaming Chart and peaked at position nine. In addition, the track debuted at position 45 on the component BGM Chart and peaked at position 31. The song appeared as the 34th biggest hit single on 2020's Gaon Year-End Digital Chart. The song entered the Billboard K-Pop 100 at position 73 and peaked at five.

== Accolades ==
Awards and nominations for "Introduce Me a Good Person"
| Year | Organization | Award | Result | Ref. |
|---|---|---|---|---|
| 2020 | APAN Music Awards | Idol Champ OST Award | Nominated | |
| 2020 | Brand of the Year Awards | OST of the Year | Nominated | |
| 2020 | Mnet Asian Music Awards | Best OST | Nominated | |
| 2020 | Mnet Asian Music Awards | Song of the Year | Nominated | |
| 2021 | Seoul Music Awards | OST Award | Nominated | |

== Track listing ==
- Digital download / streaming
1. "Introduce Me a Good Person" – 3:03
2. "Introduce Me a Good Person (Instrumental)" – 3:04

== Credits and personnel ==
Credits adapted from Melon.

Studio

- Recorded at SM Lvyin Studio
- Mixed at GoldenbellTree Sound
- Mastered at Sound Max

Personnel

- Joy – vocals
- Kim Hee-tam – songwriting
- Jung Jae-hyung – composition
- Lundi Blues – arrangement
- Lee Tae-wook – guitar
- Dailog – bass
- Snowman of Lundi Blues – drum
- Jung Ye-won – chorus
- Lee Ji-hong – recording
- Hong Sung-joon – mixing
- Do Jeonghoe – mastering
- Park Jun – mastering

== Charts ==
=== Weekly charts ===
Weekly chart performance for "Introduce Me a Good Person"
| Chart (2020) | Peak position |
|---|---|
| South Korea (Gaon) | 6 |
| South Korea (K-pop Hot 100) | 5 |

=== Monthly charts ===
Monthly chart performance for "Introduce Me a Good Person"
| Chart (May 2020) | Position |
|---|---|
| South Korea (Gaon) | 7 |

=== Year-end charts ===
2020 year-end chart performance for "Introduce Me a Good Person"
| Chart (2020) | Position |
|---|---|
| South Korea (Gaon) | 34 |

== Release history ==
Release dates and formats for "Introduce Me a Good Person"
| Region | Date | Format(s) | Label(s) | Ref. |
|---|---|---|---|---|
| Various | March 20, 2020 | Digital download; streaming | Studio MaumC; EggIsComing; Stone Music Entertainment | |
