= Je T'aime (Joy song) =

2021 single by Joy

Single by Joy

from the EP Hello
- Released: May 26, 2021
- Length: 4:21
- Label: SM; Dreamus
- Composer: Yoo Jeong-yeon
- Lyricist: Lee Do-yeon

Joy singles chronology
"Why Isn't Love Always Easy?" (2021)	"Je T'aime" (2021)	"Hello" (2021)

Live video
- "Je T'aime" on YouTube

"Je T'aime" (Korean: 쥬뗌므) is a song recorded by South Korean singer and Red Velvet member Joy. It is a cover of a song originally recorded and released by singer Hey in 2001. The song was released on May 26, 2021, by SM Entertainment as a pre-release single from her special cover EP, Hello. Composed by Yoo Jeong-yeon and written by Lee Do-yeon, the track was reinterpreted from its jazzy vibes to a classical arrangement. It peaked at position 55 on South Korea's Gaon Digital Chart and peaked at position 21 on the Billboard K-Pop Hot 100 Chart.

== Background and composition ==
According to SM Entertainment, Joy will be releasing a pre-release single, "Je T'aime", for her special remake album Hello on May 26, 2021. A mood sampler, track posters, and teaser images of the song were released through Red Velvet's official social media accounts. The track is a remake of the same name released by singer Hey in 2001.

"Je T'aime"
"Je T'aime" is a song that includes a dance-like piano performance and an "elegant string melody".

"Je T'aime" was composed by Yoo Jeong-yeon, while the lyrics were written by Lee Do-yeon. It was reported that the song was reinterpreted from the track's original "fresh and jazzy vibes" into a "colorful and classical arrangement". The track includes a dance-like piano performance. Moreover, it has an "elegant string melody" that maximizes the "fantastic atmosphere" of the song. The song is composed in the key of D major with a tempo of 111 beats per minute. The lyrics is noted for "Joy's lovely confession with a sweet tone".

== Promotion and reception ==
A live video for "Je T'aime" was released on May 26, 2021. On June 5, 2021, Joy performed the song on Show! Music Core. The track debuted at position 124 on the 22nd weekly issue of South Korea's Gaon Digital Chart for 2021 during the period dated May 23–29. It peaked at position 55 in the following week. The song also debuted at position 23 on the component Gaon Download Chart and peaked at position 17. It also debuted at position 105 on the Gaon Streaming Chart and peaked at 69. In addition, the track debuted at position 64 on the component BGM chart. The song entered the Billboard K-Pop Hot 100 at position 43 and peaked at position 21 in the following week.

== Credits and personnel ==
Credits adapted from the liner notes of Hello.

Studio

- Recorded at SM Yellow Tail Studio
- Recorded at MonoTree Studio
- Recorded at Dreamfactory Studio
- Engineered for mix at SM SSAM Studio
- Mixed at SM Concert Hall Studio
- Mastered at 821 Sound Mastering

Personnel

- Joy – vocals
- Lee Do-yeon – songwriting
- Yoo Jeong-yeon – composition
- Hwang Seong-je – arrangement, piano, keyboard, programming, strings arrangement, conducting
- ButterFly – vocal directing
- Jeong Dong-yoon – drums, percussion
- Bang In-jae – acoustic guitar
- Baek Kyung-jin – contra bass
- Park Ki-hoon – flute
- Kim Mi-jung – strings
- Kang Hyun-woong – strings
- Kim Shin-hye – strings
- Kim Jae-hyun – strings
- Park Bo-kyung – strings
- Seo Young-wan – strings
- Seo Ji-sook – strings
- Shim Sang-won – strings
- Yeo Soo-eun – strings
- Lee Su-ah – strings
- Lee Seung-jin – strings
- Jang So-hee – strings
- Jang Ji-hye – strings
- Jung Hyun-joo – strings
- No Min-ji – recording
- Kang Sun-young – recording
- Lee Pyung-wook – recording
- Seo Mi-rae – digital editing
- Kang Eun-ji – mixing engineer
- Namkoong Jin – mixing
- Kwon Nam-woo – mastering

== Charts ==
Weekly chart performance for "Je T'aime"
Chart (2021)	Peak position
South Korea (Gaon)	55
South Korea (K-pop Hot 100)	21

Monthly chart performance for "Je T'aime"
Chart (2021)	Peak position
South Korea (K-pop Hot 100)	58

== Release history ==
Release dates and formats for "Je T'aime"
Region	Date	Format(s)	Label(s)	Ref.
Various	May 26, 2021	Digital download; streaming	SM Entertainment; Dreamus	
