= Happiness: My Dear, ReVe1uv =

2024 concert tour by Red Velvet

- Tour by Red Velvet
- Seoul promotional poster
- Location: East Asia; Southeast Asia
- Associated albums: Cosmic
- Start date: August 2, 2024
- Legs: 1
- No. of shows: 9

Red Velvet concert chronology
- R to V (2023); Happiness : My Dear, ReVeluv (2024); A Day in Red & Velvet (2026)

Happiness: My Dear, ReVeluv (stylized as Happiness: My Dear, ReVe1uv) was the first fan-concert tour headlined by South Korean girl group Red Velvet to commemorate the group's tenth anniversary and supporting their seventh extended play Cosmic (2024). The tour began on August 2, 2024, in Seoul, South Korea, and they stopped at four cities across East Asia and Southeast Asia.

== Background ==
Red Velvet released a poster schedule for their EP Cosmic to their social media on June 11, 2024, revealing plans to hold their tenth anniversary Fancon titled "Happiness: My Dear, ReVe1uv" in Seoul on August 3 and 4.

On June 19, the Fancon tour later announced schedule to hold in Asia from August to September 2024.

== Set lists ==
The following set list is from the concert on August 2, 2024, in Seoul, South Korea, and is not intended to represent all shows throughout the tour.

1. "Happiness"
2. "Ice Cream Cake"
3. "Parade"
4. "Sunny Afternoon"
5. "Sunflower"
6. "Underwater"
7. "So Good"
8. "Bubble"
9. "Knock Knock (Who's There?)"
10. "Bad Boy"
11. "Psycho"
12. "Feel My Rhythm"
13. "Queendom"
14. "Cosmic"

Encore

15. "My Dear"
16. "Sweet Dreams"
17. "Red Flavor"
18. "Zimzalabim"
19. "You Better Know"

=== Surprise encore songs ===
The following songs were performed by Red Velvet as surprise song during the encore act:

- August 2 – Seoul: "Dumb Dumb"
- August 3 and 4 – Seoul and September 14 in Manila: "Hit That Drum"

== Shows ==
List of concert dates
Date	City	Country	Venue	Attendance
August 2, 2024	Seoul	South Korea	SK Olympic Handball Gymnasium	—
August 3, 2024	Seoul	South Korea	SK Olympic Handball Gymnasium	—
August 4, 2024	Seoul	South Korea	SK Olympic Handball Gymnasium	—
August 17, 2024	Bangkok	Thailand	Impact Arena	—
August 18, 2024	Bangkok	Thailand	Impact Arena	—
September 7, 2024	Jakarta	Indonesia	Beach City International Stadium	—
September 14, 2024	Manila	Philippines	SM Mall of Asia Arena	—
September 28, 2024	Macau	China	Studio City Event Center	—
September 29, 2024	Macau	China	Studio City Event Center	—
Total				N/A
