= List of Red Velvet live performances =

Red Velvet live performances
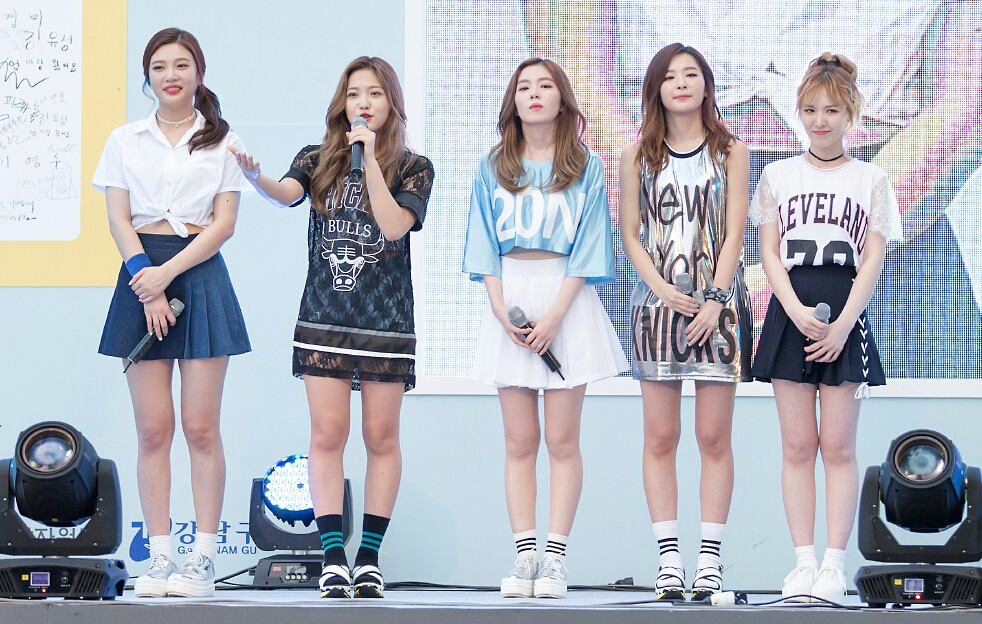
- Red Velvet in 2016
- ↙Concert tours: 4
- ↙One-off concerts: 2
- ↙Fan meetings: 8
- ↙Showcases: 5
- Online concerts: 2

South Korean girl group Red Velvet has embarked on three concert tours since their debut under SM Entertainment in 2014. They kicked off their debut concert tour, titled Red Room, with a 3-day show at the Olympic Hall in Seoul in August 2017 before continuing with 10 shows in Japan, attracting about 52,000 people in total. Red Velvet's first world tour, Redmare, began at the SK Olympic Handball Gymnasium in Seoul in August 2018, and continued with shows in Thailand, Taiwan, Singapore, Japan, United States and Canada. Their 5-date tour in Japan was attended by a total of around 40,000 people.

Red Velvet's third concert tour, La Rouge, began in November 2019 and saw 5 shows in South Korea and Japan before being halted in early 2020 due to the COVID-19 pandemic. The group's next concert tour will be called R to V and will begin at the KSPO Dome in Seoul in April 2023.

== Headlining tours ==
=== Red Velvet 3rd Concert "La Rouge" ===
Red Velvet 3rd Concert "La Rouge"
- Asia tour by Red Velvet
- Associated album: The ReVe Festival
- Start date: November 23, 2019
- End date: February 24, 2020
- No. of shows: 2 in South Korea; 3 in Japan; 5 in total

Red Velvet concert chronology
- Redmare Tour (2018–19); La Rouge Tour (2019–20); R to V (2023)

Set list
1. "Ice Cream Cake" (Tango remix)
2. "Milkshake"
3. "La Rouge"
4. "Sassy Me"
5. "Bing Bing"
6. "RBB (Really Bad Boy)"
7. "Uncover" (Seulgi's solo)
8. "Be Natural" (S.E.S. cover)
9. "Automatic"
10. "Dear Diary" (Yeri's solo)
11. "Perfect 10"
12. "Kingdom Come"
13. "Bad Boy"
14. "Light Me Up" (Wendy's solo)
15. "Red Flavor"
16. "Russian Roulette"
17. "Power Up"
18. "Umpah Umpah"
19. "Mojito"
20. "Carpool"
21. "Butterflies"
22. "You Better Know"
23. "Hit That Drum"
24. "Zimzalabim"
  Encore
25. "Time to Love"
26. "Somethin Kinda Crazy"

Concert dates
Date	City	Country	Venue
November 23, 2019	Seoul	South Korea	Tiger Dome
November 24, 2019	Seoul	South Korea	Tiger Dome
January 11, 2020	Hiroshima	Japan	Hiroshima Sun Plaza
January 23, 2020	Osaka	Japan	Osaka-jō Hall
February 24, 2020	Fukuoka	Japan	Fukuoka International Center

List of canceled dates

Date	City	Country	Venue	Reason
March 7, 2020	Yokohama	Japan	Yokohama Arena	Canceled due to COVID-19
March 8, 2020	Yokohama	Japan	Yokohama Arena	Canceled due to COVID-19

== One-off concerts ==
List of Red Velvet one-off concerts
Title	Dates	City	Country	Venue	Ref.
2022 The ReVe Festival: Prologue	Canceled (Note: Originally planned to be held on March 19–20, 2022, 2022 The ReVe Festival: Prologue was canceled as Irene, Joy, and Yeri tested positive for COVID-19.)	Seoul	South Korea	SK Olympic Handball Gymnasium / Beyond Live	
A Day in Red & Velvet	July 31–August 2, 2026	Seoul	South Korea	Tiger Dome	

== Fan meetings ==
List of Red Velvet fan meetings
Event title	Date	City	Country	Venue	Attendance	Ref.
Russian Roulette Mini Fanmeeting	September 10, 2016	Seoul	South Korea	SMT @ Coex Artium	—N/a	
Red Velvet Special Fan Signing Event	March 27, 2017	Bangkok	Thailand	Quartier Gallery	2,000	
Red Velvet "Rookie" Mini Album Event	April 14–16, 2017	Taipei	Taiwan	ATT Showbox	—N/a	
Red Velvet "Rookie" Mini Album Event	April 21–23, 2017	Kuala Lumpur	Malaysia	Bentley Music Auditorium	1,500	
Red Velvet Fanmeet in Chicago	April 29, 2018	Rosemont	United States	Rosemont Theatre	4,000	
ReVeluv-BabyParty 2019	June 14, 2019	Osaka	Japan	Zepp Namba	—N/a	
ReVeluv-BabyParty 2019	June 16, 2019	Tokyo	Japan	Toyosu Pit	—N/a	
Red Velvet Fanmeeting 'inteRView vol.5' with ReVeluv	July 27, 2019	Seoul	South Korea	Olympic Hall	—N/a	
"The ReVe Festival Day 2" Fan Event	September 3–4, 2019	Jakarta	Indonesia	Raffles Jakarta	2,000	
'InteRView' Vol. 7 Queendom	August 16, 2021	Online		Beyond Live	—N/a	
Red Velvet 'Birthday' Party in Kwangya	December 16, 2022	Seoul	South Korea	Kwangya@Seoul	—N/a	

== Showcases ==
List of Red Velvet showcases
Event title	Date	City	Country	Venue	Ref.
Red Velvet Showcase 'The Red'	September 8, 2015	Seoul	South Korea	Muse Live Hall	
Red Velvet Premium Showcase "ReVeluv-Baby Party"	November 6, 2017 (Two shows)	Tokyo	Japan	Yebisu The Garden Hall	
Red Velvet's 2nd Album 'Perfect Velvet' Comeback Showcase	November 16, 2017	Seoul	South Korea	SMTown Theater	
The Perfect Red Velvet Night	January 29, 2018	Seoul	South Korea	SMTown Theater	
Red Velvet Showcase 'The ReVe Festival Day 1'	June 19, 2019	Seoul	South Korea	Blue Square Eye Market Hall	

== Music festivals ==
Event	Date	Venue	Location	Performed song(s)	Ref.
The 5th INK Concert	September 18, 2014	Incheon Munhak Stadium	Incheon	"Happiness"	
2014 Hallyu Dream Concert	October 11, 2014	Gyeongju World Culture Expo Park	Gyeongju	"Happiness"	
Best of Best 2014	October 11, 2014	Guangzhou Beilei Theatre	Guangzhou	"Happiness"; "Be Natural"	
SBS Gayo Daejeon	December 21, 2014	COEX Hall	Seoul	"Happiness"; "Moves like Jagger" (with Winner, Got7, and Lovelyz)	
MBC Gayo Daejejeon	December 31, 2014	MBC Dream Center, Ilsan	Seoul	"Happiness"	
Best of Best 2015	May 23, 2015	Philippine Arena	Bulacan	"Ice Cream Cake"; "Somethin Kinda Crazy"; "Candy"; "Happiness"	
Gyeongbuk Children's Festival 2015	May 5, 2015	Seoul Plaza	Seoul	"Ice Cream Cake"; "Happiness"	
Dream Concert 2015	May 23, 2015	Seoul World Cup Stadium	Seoul	"Ice Cream Cake"	
KCON 2015 in LA	August 8, 2015	Staples Center	Los Angeles	"Ice Cream Cake"; "Somethin Kinda Crazy"; "Stickwitu" (The Pussycat Dolls cover); "Happiness"	
2015 Hallyu Dream Concert	September 20, 2015	Singapore Indoor Stadium	Singapore	"Dumb Dumb"	
Jump Guro Festival 2015	October 3, 2015	Seoul Plaza	Seoul	"Dumb Dumb"; "Ice Cream Cake"	
The 6th INK Concert	October 4, 2015	Incheon Munhak Stadium	Incheon	"Ice Cream Cake"; "Somethin Kinda Crazy"; "Huff n Puff"; "Candy"; "Dumb Dumb"	
Hangul Culture Big Party Gwanghwamun Plaza Festival 2015	October 8, 2015	Gwanghwamun Square	Seoul	"Dumb Dumb"; "Ice Cream Cake"	
One K Concert 2015	May 23, 2015	Seoul World Cup Stadium	Seoul	"Dumb Dumb"; "Ice Cream Cake"	
Busan One Asia Festival 2015	October 4, 2015	Busan Asiad Main Stadium	Busan	"Dumb Dumb"	
Russian Culture Festival 2015	October 24, 2015	Seoul Plaza	Seoul	"Dumb Dumb"; "Huff n Puff"; "Somethin Kinda Crazy"; "Ice Cream Cake"	
Lotte Duty Free Family Festival 2015	October 25, 2015	Olympic Gymnastics Arena	Seoul	"Dumb Dumb"; "Huff n Puff"; "Somethin Kinda Crazy"; "Lady's Room"; "Ice Cream Cake"	
Changwon K-pop World Festival 2015	October 30, 2015	Seongsan Art Hall	Changwon	"Dumb Dumb"; "Ice Cream Cake"	
Asia Dream Concert 2015	October 31, 2015	Gocheok Sky Dome	Seoul	"Ice Cream Cake"; "Dumb Dumb"	
China-Korea Song Festival 2015	November 4, 2015	Busan Asiad Main Stadium	Busan	"Dumb Dumb"	
K-Pop Concert in Prague	December 4, 2015	Sinobo Stadium	Prague	"Dumb Dumb"*; "Huff n Puff"	
SBS Gayo Daejeon	December 27, 2015	COEX Hall	Seoul	"Dumb Dumb"; "Ice Cream Cake"	
KBS Song Festival	December 30, 2015	Gocheok Sky Dome	Seoul	"Dumb Dumb"	
MBC Gayo Daejejeon	December 31, 2015	MBC Dream Center, Ilsan	Seoul	"I Love You" (S.E.S. cover); "Ice Cream Cake"	
Korea Times Music Festival 2016	May 7, 2016	Hollywood Bowl	Los Angeles	"Dumb Dumb"; "Happiness"; "Ice Cream Cake"	
The 6th Ediya Music Festa	May 21, 2016	Olympic Gymnastics Arena	Seoul	"Dumb Dumb"; "Ice Cream Cake"; "Somethin Kinda Crazy"; "Happiness"	
Dream Concert 2016	June 6, 2016	Seoul World Cup Stadium	Seoul	"Dumb Dumb"; "Ice Cream Cake"	
Thank U Festival 2016	June 18, 2016	Olympic Gymnastics Arena	Seoul	"Dumb Dumb"; "Ice Cream Cake"	
School Smoking Prevention Festival 2016	July 13, 2016	Soongsil University	Seoul	"Dumb Dumb"; "Somethin Kinda Crazy"; "Ice Cream Cake"	
Sky Festival 2016	September 3, 2016	SK Olympic Handball Gymnasium	Seoul	"Dumb Dumb"; "Ice Cream Cake"	
SBS Gayo Daejeon	December 26, 2016	COEX Hall	Seoul	"One of These Nights"; "Russian Roulette"	
KBS Song Festival	December 29, 2016	KBS Hall	Seoul	"Russian Roulette"	
MBC Gayo Daejejeon	December 31, 2016	MBC Dream Center, Ilsan	Seoul	"Russian Roulette"	
SXSW 2017	March 17, 2017	The Belmont	Austin	"Russian Roulette"; "Somethin Kinda Crazy"; "Fool"; "Dumb Dumb"; "Rookie"	
KCON 2017 in Mexico	March 18, 2017	Arena Ciudad de México	Mexico City	"Spring Love"; "Russian Roulette"; "Dumb Dumb"; "Rookie"	
Dream Concert 2017	June 3, 2017	Seoul World Cup Stadium	Seoul	"Russian Roulette"; "Rookie"	
A-Nation 2017	August 26, 2017	Ajinomoto Stadium	Tokyo	"Dumb Dumb"; "Russian Roulette"; "Rookie"; "Red Flavor"	
The 9th INK Concert	September 9, 2017	Incheon Munhak Stadium	Incheon	"Red Flavor"; "Rookie"	
SBS Gayo Daejeon	December 25, 2017	Gocheok Sky Dome	Seoul	"Peek-A-Boo"; "Red Flavor"	
KBS Song Festival	December 29, 2017	KBS Hall	Seoul	"Happily Ever After"; "Rookie"; "Red Flavor"; "Peek-A-Boo"	
MBC Gayo Daejejeon	December 31, 2017	MBC Dream Center, Ilsan	Seoul	"Peek-A-Boo"	
Spring is Coming	April 1, 2018	East Pyongyang Grand Theatre	Pyongyang	"Bad Boy"; "Red Flavor"	
Korea Times Music Festival 2018	April 28, 2018	Hollywood Bowl	Los Angeles	"Red Flavor"; "Peek-A-Boo"; "Bad Boy"	
Dream Concert 2018	May 12, 2018	Seoul World Cup Stadium	Seoul	"Bad Boy"; "Red Flavor"	
KCON 2018 in New York	June 23, 2018	Prudential Center	Newark	"Bad Boy"; "Red Flavor"; "Rookie"; "Peek-A-Boo"	
A-Nation 2018	August 26, 2018	Ajinomoto Stadium	Tokyo	"Red Flavor"; "Dumb Dumb"; "Russian Roulette"; "#Cookie Jar"; "Power Up"	
SBS Gayo Daejeon	December 25, 2018	Gocheok Sky Dome	Seoul	"Bad Boy"; RBB (Really Bad Boy)"	
KBS Song Festival	December 28, 2018	KBS Hall	Seoul	"Be Natural"; "RBB (Really Bad Boy)"; "Hit That Drum"; "Power Up"	
MBC Gayo Daejejeon	December 31, 2018	MBC Dream Center, Ilsan	Seoul	"RBB (Really Bad Boy)"	
Dream Concert 2019	May 18, 2019	Seoul World Cup Stadium	Seoul	"Power Up"; "Red Flavor"	
K-pop World Music Festival 2019	June 9, 2019	SM Mall of Asia Arena	Manila	"Red Flavor"; "Power Up"; "Moonlight Melody"; "Bad Boy"; "RBB (Really Bad Boy)"	
MBC Music K-World Festa Festival 2019	August 16, 2019	Olympic Gymnastics Arena	Seoul	"Zimzalabim"; "Power Up"	
SBS Gayo Daejeon	December 25, 2019	Gocheok Sky Dome	Seoul	"Psycho"	
MBC Gayo Daejejeon	December 31, 2019	MBC Dream Center, Ilsan	Seoul	"It's You" (with Sung Si-kyung)	
KBS Song Festival	December 17, 2021	KBS Hall	Seoul	"Psycho"; "Queendom"	
SBS Gayo Daejeon	December 25, 2021	Incheon Namdong Gymnasium	Seoul	"When This Rain Stops" (Wendy solo); "Hello" (Joy solo); "Queendom"	
MBC Gayo Daejejeon	December 31, 2021	MBC Dream Center, Ilsan	Seoul	"Queendom"	
Dream Concert 2022	June 18, 2022	Seoul World Cup Stadium	Seoul	"Feel My Rhythm"; "Queendom"	
MIK Festival 2022	July 30, 2022	Southwark Park	London	"Feel My Rhythm"; "Psycho"; "Bad Boy"; "Peek-A-Boo"; "Bamboleo"; "Carpool"; "You Better Know"; "Queendom"; "Red Flavor"	
Primavera Sound 2023	June 1, 2023	Parc del Fòrum	Barcelona	"Feel My Rhythm"; "Queendom"; "Birthday"; "Oh Boy"; "Bamboleo"; "Peek-A-Boo"; "Beg For Me"; "Zoom"; "Bad Boy"; "Psycho"; "You Better Know"; "Zimzalabim"; "Red Flavor"	
Supersound Festival 2023	November 19, 2023	Impact Challenger Hall 3	Bangkok	"Chill Kill"; "Psycho"; "Feel My Rhythm"; "You Better Know"; "Red Flavor"	
Lazada Fest 2023	December 13, 2023	Indonesia Arena	Jakarta	"Chill Kill"; "Psycho"; "Feel My Rhythm"; "You Better Know"; "Red Flavor"	
KCON 2024 in Japan	May 11, 2024	Zozo Marine Stadium	Chiba	"Chill Kill"; "Queendom"; "Feel My Rhythm"	
K-Mega Concert 2024	July 13, 2024	Kaohsiung Arena	Kaohsiung	"Feel My Rhythm"; "Chill Kill"; "Queendom"; "Bubble"; "You Better Know"; "Red Flavor"; "Cosmic"	
A-Nation 2024	September 1, 2024	Ajinomoto Stadium	Tokyo	"Wildside"; "Feel My Rhythm"; "Aitai-tai"; "Swimming Pool"; "Red Flavor"; "Cosmic"	
SBS Gayo Daejeon 2026 Summer	August 9, 2026	Korea International Exhibition Center	Goyang	"Surfin' Boy"	

== Award shows ==
Event	Date	Performed songs
29th Golden Disc Awards	January 15, 2015	"Happiness"
The 24th Seoul Music Awards	January 15, 2015	"Be Natural"; "Happiness"
2015 Melon Music Awards	November 7, 2015	"Dumb Dumb"
The 25th Seoul Music Awards	January 14, 2016	"Dumb Dumb"
30th Golden Disc Awards	January 20, 2016	"Ice Cream Cake"; "Dumb Dumb"
The 5th Gaon Chart Music Awards	February 17, 2016	"Automatic"; "Ice Cream Cake"
2016 Melon Music Awards	November 19, 2016	"Russian Roulette"
31st Golden Disc Awards	January 14, 2017	"One of These Nights"; "Russian Roulette"
The 26th Seoul Music Awards	January 19, 2017	"Lucky Girl"; "Russian Roulette"
Soribada Best K-Music Awards 2017	September 20, 2017	"Rookie"; "Red Flavor"
2017 Mnet Asian Music Awards	December 1, 2017	"Peek-A-Boo"; "Red Flavor"
2017 Melon Music Awards	December 2, 2017	"Peek-A-Boo"; "Red Flavor"
32nd Golden Disc Awards	January 10, 2018	"Rookie"; "Red Flavor"
The 27th Seoul Music Awards	January 25, 2018	"Peek-A-Boo"; "Red Flavor"
The 28th Seoul Music Awards	January 15, 2019	"RBB (Really Bad Boy)"
The 8th Gaon Chart Music Awards	January 23, 2019	"With You"; "Power Up"
The Fact Music Awards 2019	April 24, 2019	"RBB (Really Bad Boy)"; "You Better Know"
Soribada Best K-Music Awards 2019	August 23, 2019	"Zimzalabim"; "Umpah Umpah"
The 4th Asia Artist Awards	November 26, 2019	"Umpah Umpah"; "Zimzalabim"
The 29th Seoul Music Awards	January 30, 2020	"Happiness"; "Ice Cream Cake"; "Red Flavor"; "Peek-A-Boo"; "Psycho"
The 11th Gaon Chart Music Awards	January 27, 2022	"Queendom"
2022 Genie Music Awards	November 8, 2022	"Feel My Rhythm"

== Concert participation ==
- SM Town Live World Tour IV (2014–2015)
- SM Town Live World Tour V (2016)
- SM Town Live World Tour VI (2017–2018)
- SM Town Live Culture Humanity (2021)
- SM Town Live 2022: SMCU Express at Kwangya (2022)
- SM Town Live 2022: SMCU Express (2022)
- SM Town Live 2023: SMCU Palace at Kwangya (2023)
- SM Town Live 2025: The Culture, the Future (2025)
