= Redmare =

2018–19 concert tour by Red Velvet

Redmare Tour
- Tour by Red Velvet
- Associated album: Summer Magic
- Start date: August 4, 2018
- End date: February 21, 2019
- Legs: 2
- No. of shows: 11 in Asia; 8 in North America; 19 total

Red Velvet concert chronology
- Red Room (2017–18); Redmare (2018–19); La Rouge (2019–20)

Redmare (stylized in all caps) was the second concert tour headlined by South Korean girl group Red Velvet, in support of their second special extended play Summer Magic (2018). The tour began on August 4, 2018, in Seoul, two days prior the release of Summer Magic, consisting of 19 shows. It was the group's first North American concert tour, with eight shows in the United States and Canada.

== Background and development ==
The tour was officially announced in July 2018 with tickets going on sale on July 5, 2018. The tour began in Seoul's SK Olympic Handball Gymnasium on August 4, 2018. Tamar Herman from Billboard described the Newark, New Jersey concert as focusing on their "...vibrant brand of poppish "red" songs."

== Concert synopsis ==
Under the concept of "theme park", the concert will consist of five sections, ranging from fantasy adventure to Amazon, parades, horror adventure, and the real world. The shows on the Redmare featured a nearly identical set list. The concert began with Red Velvet breaking through a red curtain on the center stage, which subsequently served as the backdrop to the performance of "Russian Roulette". The group then performed "Power Up", which was yet to be released that same day as the concert. For the follow-up performance of "#Cookie Jar", the group sang the song for the first time in South Korea where they showed off its fast tempo and choreography. The group proceeded with a remix version of "My Second Date", during which Red Velvet performed a dance performance. After the performance of "Mosquito", the group performed "Look" as an end to the fantasy adventure theme.

The show continued with "Mr. E", during which the group wore different colors of costumes as Red Velvet are dressed like a rabbit, a bear, a puppy, a chick, and a unicorn. The song was used as the opening for the Amazon concept. After the song ended, the group performed "Zoo", which was followed by "Happiness" and "Hit the Drum". The group performed "Lucky Girl", as an opening for the parade concept. After "Lucky Girl", the group performed "Bad Dracula" and "All Right" while each member was standing on a moving platform moving toward the fans. The group proceeded with "Blue Lemonade", "About Love", and "Moonlight Melody", to wrap-up the parade concept.

For the performance of "Bad Boy" and "Peek-A-Boo", the group dressed in black-colored clothes. The songs performed were the opening tracks of the horror adventure concept. The group then performed a remix version of "Dumb Dumb", with a robot dance performance. Afterward, the group performed their hit single "Red Flavor". The group followed with "Rookie" as an end to horror adventure theme. The show concluded with "Ice Cream Cake" and "Day 1", during which the songs were performed for the encore stage.

== Critical reception ==
The Redmare received positive reviews from critics. Go Seung-ah from Herald Pop described the concert as "enough to give you cool, pleasant energy like a vacation and give you another charging time". Shin Yeon-kyung from MK Sports noted the theme park concept of the concert adding that the "various music, performances, and videos will give an interest" as if the audience were in a "real amusement park." Kim Soo-jung from No Cut News praised the enthusiasm that filled the concert hall noting that even the reporters who did not follow the fan chant, sing or stand to watch did not need any further explanations to describe the excitement felt. Yoon Ki-baek from Sports World described the concert as "particularly impressive" noting its well-organized, solid concept, and constant communication with fans. Kim Jenny from Star Daily News praised the group for the "unique music, performance, and video that will be remembered by the audience for its cool performance like a gift in the hot summer". Park Dong-sun from The Electronic Times described Red Velvet's concert as "a luxury performance that overshadowed the summer heat" from the enthusiasm that the group had from the performances and the responses from the audience.

== Set lists ==
This set list is not intended to represent all shows from the tour.

Set list in Seoul, Bangkok, Taiwan & Singapore
1. "Russian Roulette"
2. "Power Up"
3. "#Cookie Jar"
4. "My Second Date" (Solo dance remix)
5. "Mosquito"
6. "Look"
7. "Mr.E"
8. "Zoo"
9. "Happiness"
10. "Hit That Drum"
11. "Lucky Girl"
12. "Bad Dracula"
13. "All Right"
14. "Blue Lemonade"
15. "About Love"
16. "Moonlight Melody"
17. "Bad Boy"
18. "Peek-a-Boo"
19. "Dumb Dumb" (Remix)
20. "Red Flavor"
21. "Rookie" (Extended ver.)
  Encore
22. "Ice Cream Cake"
23. "Day 1"
Set list for North America
1. "Russian Roulette"
2. "Power Up"
3. "My Second Date" (Solo dance remix)
4. "Mosquito"
5. "Look"
6. "Mr.E"
7. "Zoo"
8. "Happiness"
9. "Hit That Drum" (Short version)
10. "Lucky Girl"
11. "Bad Dracula"
12. "All Right"
13. "Blue Lemonade"
14. "About Love"
15. "Moonlight Melody"
16. "Bad Boy" (English version)
17. "Peek-a-Boo"
18. "RBB (Really Bad Boy)" (English version)
19. "Rookie" (Extended ver.)
  Encore
20. "Day 1"
21. "Red Flavor"
Set list in Japan
1. "Russian Roulette" (Japanese version)
2. "Power Up"
3. "#Cookie Jar"
4. "My Second Date" (Solo dance remix)
5. "Mosquito"
6. "Look"
7. "Mr.E"
8. "Zoo"
9. "Happiness"
10. "Hit That Drum"
11. "Lucky Girl"
12. "Sappy"
13. "Bad Dracula"
14. "All Right"
15. "Aitai-Tai"
16. "About Love"
17. "Moonlight Melody"
18. "Bad Boy"
19. "Peek-a-Boo"
20. "RBB (Really Bad Boy)"
21. "Rookie" (Extended ver.)
  Encore
22. "With You"
23. "Day 1"
24. "Red Flavor" (Japanese version)

== Shows ==
List of concert dates
| Date | City | Country | Venue | Attendance |
Asia
| August 4, 2018 | Seoul | South Korea | SK Olympic Handball Gymnasium | 10,000 |
| August 5, 2018 | Seoul | South Korea | SK Olympic Handball Gymnasium | 10,000 |
| September 8, 2018 | Bangkok | Thailand | Thunder Dome | 5,000 |
| September 22, 2018 | Taipei | Taiwan | National Taiwan University Sports Center | 4,800 |
| September 23, 2018 | Taipei | Taiwan | National Taiwan University Sports Center | 4,800 |
| October 20, 2018 | Singapore | | The Star Theatre | 4,000 |
| January 6, 2019 | Fukuoka | Japan | Marine Messe Fukuoka | 40,000 |
| January 12, 2019 | Kobe | Japan | World Memorial Hall | 40,000 |
| January 13, 2019 | Kobe | Japan | World Memorial Hall | 40,000 |
| January 29, 2019 | Yokohama | Japan | Yokohama Arena | 40,000 |
| January 30, 2019 | Yokohama | Japan | Yokohama Arena | 40,000 |
North America
| February 7, 2019 | Los Angeles | United States | Pasadena Civic Auditorium | 6,000 |
| February 8, 2019 | Los Angeles | United States | Pasadena Civic Auditorium | 6,000 |
| February 10, 2019 | Dallas | United States | The Theatre at Grand Prairie | — |
| February 13, 2019 | Miami | United States | Fillmore Miami Beach | — |
| February 15, 2019 | Chicago | United States | Chicago Theatre | — |
| February 17, 2019 | Newark | United States | New Jersey Performing Arts Center | 3,000 |
| February 19, 2019 | Toronto | Canada | Coca-Cola Coliseum | — |
| February 21, 2019 | Vancouver | Canada | PNE Forum | — |
| Total | | | | N/A |

== Television broadcast ==
Television premiere date, country of broadcast, title of program, date filmed, and location filmed
| Premiere date | Country | Channel | Program title | Recording date | Recording location | Ref. |
|---|---|---|---|---|---|---|
| March 31, 2019 | Japan | Wowow | Red Velvet ARENA TOUR in JAPAN "REDMARE" | January 30, 2019 | Yokohama Arena | |
