= Chill Kill =

- Digital cover

Studio album by Red Velvet
- Released: November 13, 2023
- Studios: SM Studios (Seoul, South Korea)
- Length: 33:30
- Languages: Korean; English
- Labels: SM; Kakao

Red Velvet chronology
The ReVe Festival 2022 – Birthday (2022)	Chill Kill (2023)	Cosmic (2024)

Singles from Chill Kill
- 1. "Chill Kill" Released: November 13, 2023

Chill Kill is the third Korean studio album and fourth overall by South Korean girl group Red Velvet. It was released by SM Entertainment on November 13, 2023, and contains ten tracks, including the lead single of the same name.

== Background and release ==
On September 18, 2023, SM Entertainment announced that Red Velvet would be releasing their third studio album in November 2023. On October 18, it was announced that their third studio album titled What a Chill Kill would be released on November 13. Five days later, the album name was renamed to Chill Kill, and would contain ten tracks, including the lead single of the same name. On October 24, the promotional schedule was released. On October 25, the mood sampler teaser videos for Seulgi, Irene, Joy, and Yeri were released, followed by the teaser video for Wendy a day later. On November 6, the teaser trailer was released. On November 9, the highlight medley teaser video was released, followed by the music video teaser for "Chill Kill" a day later. The album was released alongside the music video for "Chill Kill" on November 13.

== Composition ==
Chill Kill contains ten tracks. The lead single "Chill Kill" is a pop dance song characterized by "heavy bass, string melodies, dreamy synths, and bell rhythm" with lyrics "expressing the narrative of a love affair and longing for the other person even in the midst of tragedy when the quiet world was turned upside down". The second track "Knock Knock (Who's There?)" is a dance song characterized by "the combination of sharp string rhythm and mysterious bell sounds with heavy bass" with lyrics "depicting the moment of falling into a sweet and dizzying game of tag in a dream that begins with a knock on the door". The third track "Underwater" adopts a "slow-tempo" R&B vibe, characterized by "heavy and groovy bass, and dreamy synth rhythm" with lyrics about "comparing the infinite love to distant deep water". The fourth track "Will I Ever See You Again?" features "energetic beats and synth drop" with lyrics having the theme of "moving forward with a calm and positive attitude in any situation". The fifth track "Nightmare" is a "medium-tempo" R&B song with "heavy string orchestration and a retro swing rhythm".

The sixth track "Iced Coffee" is a "minimal" R&B ballad song with "emotional strings and calm guitar rhythm". The seventh track "One Kiss" is a "fast-paced groove" dance song that "combines powerful bass and synth sounds with an addictive hook" with lyrics about "capturing the heart a stranger with just a kiss while making it the perfect secret". The eighth track "Bulldozer" is a dance song featuring "heavy and powerful bass, and catchy sound effects" with lyrics "expressing the attitude of not stopping, and breaking it if someone sets a limit or blocks it". The ninth track "Wings" adopts a "up-tempo" R&B vibe, bringing together "piano, bell, and synth rhythm combined with jazz" with lyrics about "delivering a message of hope and support" carrying the message of "comparing the attitude toward life to the birth and flight of a butterfly". For the tenth and final track "Scenery" was described as a ballad song highlighted by "gentle guitar melody" with lyrics narrating "a simple story about drawing the precious memories accumulated over a long time like a landscape painting of the four seasons by filling each day together".

== Commercial performance ==
Chill Kill debuted at number two on South Korea's Circle Album Chart in the chart issue dated November 19–25, 2023. The album later rose to number one on Circle Album Chart in the chart issue dated December 17–23, 2023, becoming Red Velvet's thirteenth number-one album on the said chart, extend their record as a girl group with the most number-one album. In Japan, the album debuted at number 45 on the Billboard Japan Hot Albums in the chart issue dated November 15, 2023; on its component chart, the album debuted at number 12 on the Top Download Albums. On the Oricon chart, the album debuted at number 25 on the Albums Chart, and number 14 on the Digital Albums Chart in the chart issue dated November 27, 2023.

In the United States, Chill Kill debuted at number 14 on the Billboard World Albums, and number 14 on the Billboard Heatseekers Albums in the chart issue dated November 25, 2023. In United Kingdom, the album debuted at number 33 on the OCC's UK Album Downloads Chart. In Australia, the album debuted at number ten on the ARIA Top 20 Hitseekers Albums Chart in the chart issue dated November 20, 2023.

== Critical reception ==
Professional ratings
Review scores
Source	Rating
Financial Times	3/5 stars
NME	4/5 stars
Sputnikmusic	3.4/5 stars

Billboard ranked the album at number 22 on their list of The 25 Best K-Pop Albums of 2023, noting "Chill Kill" and "Knock Knock (Who's There?)" for "harking back" to the group's previous works like "Bad Boy" and "Psycho". The publication called the track "Will I Ever See You Again" "a Technicolor dream woven with dancing synths" and referred to "Underwater" as "one of Red Velvet's most satisfyingly sultry moments." Paste praised the record's composition and musical styles and ranked it number 12 on their list of The 20 Best K-pop Albums of 2023, and NME ranked "Knock Knock (Who's There?)" at number 9 on their list of The best 25 K-pop songs of 2023.

== Promotion ==
Prior to the release of Chill Kill, on November 13, 2023, Red Velvet held a live event called "Red Velvet 'Chill Kill' Countdown Live" on YouTube, TikTok, Weverse, and Idol Plus, aimed at introducing the album and connecting with their fanbase.

== Track listing ==
Chill Kill track listing
No.	Title	Lyrics	Music	Arrangement	Length
1.	"Chill Kill"	Kenzie	Kenzie; Jonathan Gusmark; Ludvig Evers; Moa "Cazzi Opeia" Carlebecker; Ellen Berg	Moonshine; Kenzie	3:35
2.	"Knock Knock (Who's There?)"	Jo Yoon-kyung	Jinbyjin; Moa "Cazzi Opeia" Carlebecker; Ellen Berg	Jinbyjin	3:21
3.	"Underwater"	Kim Bo-eun (Jam Factory)	B Ham; Deez; Lourdiz	B Ham; Deez	3:25
4.	"Will I Ever See You Again?"	Lee Eun-hwa (153/Joombas); Kang Eun-jung; Lee Hye-yum (Jam Factory); Lee Seu-ran; Moon Seol-ri	Mats Koray Genc; Nermin Harambašić; Moa "Cazzi Opeia" Carlebecker; Siv Marit Egseth; Hugo Solis; Kristian Dahl Bergsland	Mats Koray Genc	3:11
5.	"Nightmare"	Mok Ji-min (Lalala Studio)	David Anthony Eames; Moa "Cazzi Opeia" Carlebecker; Ellen Berg	Bangkok	3:25
6.	"Iced Coffee"	Jo Yoon-kyung	Alina Smith; Annalise Morelli (153/Joombas); Gabriella DeMartino	Lyre	3:18
7.	"One Kiss"	Lee Seu-ran	Jonathan Gusmark; Ludvig Evers; Moa "Cazzi Opeia" Carlebecker; Ellen Berg	Moonshine	3:20
8.	"Bulldozer"	Bay (153/Joombas)	Jacob Attwooll; Jon Eyden; Moa "Cazzi Opeia" Carlebecker	Jacob Attwooll	2:41
9.	"Wings"	Jang Jung-won (Jam Factory); Na Jeong-ah (153/Joombas)	Greg Bonnick; Hayden Chapman; Adrian McKinnon; Taet Chesterton; Sevn Dayz	LDN Noise	3:44
10.	"Scenery" (풍경화; Punggyeonghwa)	Lee Joo-hyung (MonoTree)	Lee Joo-hyung (MonoTree); Jukjae; Willemijn May; Ciara Muscat	Lee Joo-hyung (MonoTree); Jukjae	3:30
Total length:					33:30

== Credits and personnel ==
Credits adapted from album's liner notes.

Studio

- SM LVYIN Studio – recording (track 1), digital editing (track 1, 3, 8), engineered for mix, mixing (track 9)
- SM Droplet Studio – recording (track 2)
- SM Yellow Tail Studio – recording (track 2, 5, 7–8), digital editing, engineered for mix (track 5)
- Doobdoob Studio – recording (track 5–6, 9–10), digital editing (track 2–3, 9)
- SM SSAM Studio – recording (track 3–5, 7, 9–10), digital editing (track 2, 7), engineered for mix (track 10)
- 77F Studio – digital editing (track 4)
- SM Aube Studio – digital editing (track 4)
- SM Starlight Studio – digital editing (track 4), mixing (track 6, 10)
- SM Big Shot Studio – digital editing (track 6–7), engineered for mix (track 6)
- Sound Pool Studio – digital editing (track 8), mixing (track 3)
- MonoTree Studio – digital editing (track 10)
- SM Blue Ocean Studio – mixing (track 1, 8)
- SM Blue Cup Studio – mixing (track 2, 5)
- Klang Studio – mixing (track 4)
- SM Concert Hall Studio – mixing (track 7)
- 821 Sound – mastering (all tracks)

Personnel

- Red Velvet – vocals, background vocals (all tracks)
- Kenzie – lyrics, composition, arrangement, vocal directing (track 1)
- Jonatan Gusmark (Moonshine) – composition, arrangement (track 1, 7)
- Ludvig Evers (Moonshine) – composition, arrangement (track 1, 7)
- Moa "Cazzi Opeia" Carlebecker – composition, background vocals (track 1–2, 4–5, 7–8)
- Ellen Berg – composition (track 1–2, 5, 7), background vocals (track 1–2, 5, 7–8)
- Jo Yoon-kyung – lyrics (track 2, 6)
- Jinbyjin – composition, arrangement, vocal directing (track 2)
- Kim Bo-eun (Jam Factory) – lyrics (track 3)
- B Ham – composition, arrangement (track 3)
- Deez – composition, arrangement, vocal directing (track 3)
- Lourdiz – composition, background vocals (track 3)
- Lee Eun-hwa (153/Joombas) – lyrics (track 4)
- Kang Eun-jung – lyrics (track 4)
- Lee Hye-yum (Jam Factory) – lyrics (track 4)
- Lee Seu-ran – lyrics (track 4, 7)
- Moon Seol-ri – lyrics (track 4)
- Mats Koray Genc a.k.a. JFMee – composition, arrangement (track 4)
- Nermin Harambašić – composition (track 4)
- Siv Marit Egseth a.k.a. YNGA – composition (track 4)
- Hugo Solis – composition (track 4)
- Kristian Dahl Bergsland – composition (track 4)
- Mok Ji-min (Lalala Studio) – lyrics (track 5)
- David Anthony Eames a.k.a. Bangkok – composition, arrangement (track 5)
- Alina Smith (Lyre) – composition, arrangement, background vocals, guitar, MIDI programming (track 6)
- Annalise Morelli (153/Joombas) a.k.a. Elli Moore (Lyre) – composition, arrangement (track 6)
- Gabriella DeMartino – composition (track 6)
- Bay (153/Joombas) – lyrics (track 8)
- Jacob Attwooll – composition, arrangement (track 8)
- Jon Eyden – composition (track 8)
- Jang Jung-won (Jam Factory) – lyrics (track 9)
- Na Jeong-ah (153/Joombas) – lyrics (track 9)
- Greg Bonnick (LDN Noise) – composition, arrangement (track 9)
- Hayden Chapman (LDN Noise) – composition, arrangement (track 9)
- Adrian McKinnon – composition, background vocals (track 9)
- Taet Chesterton – composition, background vocals (track 9)
- Sevn Dayz – composition, background vocals (track 9)
- Lee Joo-hyung (MonoTree) – lyrics, composition, arrangement, vocal directing, drums, bass, keyboards, Pro Tools operating, digital editing (track 10)
- Jukjae – composition, arrangement, guitar (track 10)
- Willemijn May – composition (track 10)
- Ciara Muscat – composition (track 10)
- Kim Jin-hwan – vocal directing (track 4, 7)
- Seo Mi-rae – vocal directing, Pro Tools operating (track 5–6), digital editing (track 5)
- Maxx Song – vocal directing, Pro Tools operating (track 5–6, 9)
- MinGtion – vocal directing (track 8)
- Kwon Ae-jin – background vocals (track 10)
- Lee Ji-hong – recording (track 1), digital editing (track 1, 3, 8), engineered for mix, mixing (track 9)
- Noh Min-ji – recording (track 2, 5, 8), digital editing, engineered for mix (track 5)
- Kim Joo-hyun – recording (track 2, 4–5, 7, 9)
- Kim Hyo-joon – recording (track 3–4, 7), digital editing (track 4)
- Kang Eun-ji – recording (track 4, 10), digital editing (track 2, 7), engineered for mix (track 10)
- Eugene Kwon – recording (track 6), digital editing (track 2–3)
- Jang Woo-young – recording (track 5–6, 9), digital editing (track 9)
- Kim Ji-hyun – recording (track 10)
- Woo Min-jeong – digital editing (track 4)
- Jeong Yoo-ra – digital editing (track 4), mixing (track 6, 10)
- Lee Min-kyu – digital editing (track 6–7), engineered for mix (track 6)
- Jeong Ho-jin – digital editing (track 8)
- Kim Cheol-sun – mixing (track 1, 8)
- Jung Eui-seok – mixing (track 2, 5)
- Kim Han-koo – mixing (track 3)
- Koo Jong-pil – mixing (track 4)
- Nam Koong-jin – mixing (track 7)
- Kwon Nam-woo – mastering (all tracks)

== Charts ==
=== Weekly charts ===
Weekly chart performance for Chill Kill
Chart (2023)	Peak position
Australian Hitseekers Albums (ARIA)	10
Japanese Albums (Oricon)	12
Japanese Combined Albums (Oricon)	14
Japanese Hot Albums (Billboard Japan)	10
South Korean Albums (Circle)	1
UK Album Downloads (OCC)	33
US Heatseekers Albums (Billboard)	14
US World Albums (Billboard)	11

=== Monthly charts ===
Monthly chart performance for Chill Kill
Chart (2023)	Position
Japanese Albums (Oricon)	49
South Korean Albums (Circle)	5

=== Year-end charts ===
Year-end chart performance for Chill Kill
Chart (2023)	Position
South Korean Albums (Circle)	47

== Certifications ==
Certifications for Chill Kill
Region	Certification	Certified units/sales
South Korea (KMCA)	2× Platinum	500,000^{^}
^{^} Shipments figures based on certification alone.

== Release history ==
Release history for Chill Kill
Region	Date	Format	Label
South Korea	November 13, 2023	CD	SM; Kakao
Various	November 13, 2023	Digital download; streaming	SM; Kakao
