= Cosmic (EP) =

- Digital cover

EP by Red Velvet
- Released: June 24, 2024
- Studio: SM Studios (Seoul, South Korea)
- Genre: Dance-pop; synth-pop; R&B
- Length: 20:11
- Language: Korean; English
- Label: SM; Kakao

Red Velvet chronology
Chill Kill (2023)	Cosmic (2024)	Velvet Summer (2026)

Alternative cover
- Cosmie version cover

Singles from Cosmic
- 1. "Cosmic" Released: June 24, 2024; 2. "Sweet Dreams" Released: August 1, 2024

Professional ratings
Review scores
Source	Rating
AllMusic	4/5 stars

Cosmic is the seventh Korean extended play (EP) and fifteenth overall by South Korean girl group Red Velvet. It was released by SM Entertainment on June 24, 2024, and contains six tracks including the lead single of the same name. On August 1, 2024, an alternate version with the addition of the EP's second single "Sweet Dreams" was released to commemorate the group's 10th anniversary.

== Background and release ==
On June 10, 2024, SM Entertainment announced that Red Velvet would be releasing their seventh Korean extended play titled Cosmic. A day later, the promotional schedule was released. On June 13, it was announced that the lead single would be titled "Cosmic". A day later, mood teasers of individual members was released. On June 20, a trailer video titled "Love is Cosmic" was released. Three days later, the music video teaser for "Cosmic" was released. The extended play was released alongside the music video for "Cosmic" on June 24.

On July 14, it was announced that a new version titled "Cosmie version" containing the single "Sweet Dreams" would be released on August 1.

== Composition ==
Cosmic contains six tracks. The lead single, "Cosmic", was described as a dance-pop song characterized by "synth strings and disco rhythm" with "fairytale-like" lyrics about "meeting [the listener], a lonely traveler who crash-landed on [Red Velvet] and learning about infinite love like the universe". The second track, "Sunflower", was described as a dance-pop song featuring "lively yet emotional melody" with lyrics about "a sunflower having a crush on the sun and wanting to stay with you even if I had to fly into space and change day and night". The third track, "Last Drop", was described as a "bass heavy" R&B pop song with lyrics about "I was able to shine because you were always protecting me like the universe". The fourth track, "Love Arcade", was described as a "medium-tempo" dance-pop song featuring "fun sound effects reminiscent of an arcade and keyboard sounds" with lyrics about "a witty story about letting go and creating our own world as our hearts guide us, including breaking all the rules that stand in the way between you and me". The fifth track, "Bubble", was described as a synth-pop and dance song featuring "drum beat, bass, and keyboard performance" with lyrics about "the world is so dazzling around you that the entire universe will envy you wherever you are". The last track, "Night Drive", was described as a "medium-tempo" R&B pop song featuring a "dream-like atmosphere with languid melody over a dreamy synth rhythm" with lyrics about "a drive on a wonderful night with our memories engraved like stars, expressing the desire to trust each other and move forward together wherever we go in the future".

== Promotion ==
Prior to the release of Cosmic, on June 24, 2024, Red Velvet held a live event called "Red Velvet 'Cosmic' Countdown Live" on YouTube, TikTok, and Weverse, aimed at introducing the extended play and connecting with their fanbase.

== Track listing ==
Cosmic standard version track listing
No.	Title	Lyrics	Music	Arrangement	Length
1.	"Cosmic"	Kenzie	Kenzie; Jonatan Gusmark; Ludvig Evers; Adrian McKinnon; Ellen Berg	Moonshine; Kenzie	3:46
2.	"Sunflower"	Kim In-hyung (JamFactory); Jeong Mul-hwa (JamFactory)	Moa "Cazzi Opeia" Carlebecker; Wilhelmina; Jonatan Gusmark; Ludvig Evers	Moonshine	3:17
3.	"Last Drop"	Bay (153/Joombas); Zaya (153/Joombas)	Alida Garpestad Peck; James Wong; David Brook	James Wong	3:23
4.	"Love Arcade"	Liljune (153/Joombas)	Ryan Kim; Devine Channel; Jayna Brown; Denzelworldpeace; Sakehands; Yumi K.; Geist Way	Ryan Kim; Devine Channel; Denzelworldpeace; Sakehands	2:57
5.	"Bubble"	Sumin; Soyo	Charli Taft; Sumin; Daniel "Obi" Klein	Daniel "Obi" Klein	3:28
6.	"Night Drive"	Danke; Moon Seol-ri; Na Jeong-ah (153/Joombas); Yoo Jae-eun (JamFactory)	Flip_00; Isak Alvedahl; 37; Rachael Chevlin	Flip_00; 37	3:20
Total length:					20:11

Cosmie version bonus track
No.	Title	Lyrics	Music	Arrangement	Length
7.	"Sweet Dreams"	Moon Seol-ri; Danke; Zaya (153/Joombas); Choi Bo-ra (153/Joombas); Kim Soo-ji (lalala studio)	Alexei Viktorovitch; Kella Armitage; Gavin Jones	Alexei Viktorovitch	3:09
Total length:					23:20

== Credits and personnel ==
Credits adapted from the EP's liner notes.

Studio

- SM Aube Studio – recording (track 1, 5), engineered for mix (track 5)
- SM Yellow Tail Studio – recording (track 2–3, 6), digital editing (track 1)
- SM Dorii Studio – recording (track 2), digital editing (track 4)
- SM Droplet Studio – recording (track 3–4), digital editing (track 2)
- Sound Pool Studio – recording (track 3, 6), digital editing (track 6), mixing (track 3)
- SM Big Shot Studio – recording (track 4), digital editing (track 5)
- Golden Bell Tree Sound – recording (track 5)
- Doobdoob Studio – digital editing (track 1–2, 4)
- SM Lvyin Studio – digital editing, engineered for mix (track 3, 6)
- SM Blue Ocean Studio – mixing (track 1)
- SM Starlight Studio – mixing (track 2)
- SM Blue Cup Studio – mixing (track 4)
- Klang Studio – mixing (track 5)
- SM Concert Hall Studio – mixing (track 6)
- Sterling Sound – mastering (all tracks)

Personnel

- SM Entertainment – executive producer
- Park Jun-young – creative executive
- Lee Sung-soo – A&R executive
- Tak Young-jun – IP executive, executive supervisor
- Jang Cheol-hyuk – executive supervisor
- Red Velvet – vocals, background vocals (all tracks)
- Kenzie – lyrics, composition, arrangement, vocal directing (track 1)
- Jonatan Gusmark (Moonshine) – composition, arrangement (track 1–2)
- Ludvig Evers (Moonshine) – composition, arrangement (track 1–2)
- Adrian McKinnon – composition, background vocals (track 1)
- Ellen Berg – composition, background vocals (track 1)
- Kim In-hyung (Jam Factory) – lyrics (track 2)
- Jeong Mul-hwa (Jam Factory) – lyrics (track 2)
- Moa "Cazzi Opeia" Carlebecker – composition, background vocals (track 2)
- Wilhelmina – composition, background vocals (track 2)
- Bay (153/Joombas) – lyrics (track 3)
- Zaya (153/Joombas) – lyrics (track 3)
- Alida Garpestad Peck – composition, background vocals (track 3)
- James Wong – composition, arrangement (track 3)
- David Brook – composition (track 3)
- Liljune (153/Joombas) – lyrics (track 4)
- Ryan Kim – composition, arrangement, bass, synthesizer (track 4)
- Devine Channel – composition, arrangement (track 4)
- Jayna Brown – composition, background vocals (track 4)
- denzelworldpeace – composition, arrangement (track 4)
- Sakehands – composition, arrangement (track 4)
- Yumi K. – composition, keyboards (track 4)
- Geist Way – composition (track 4)
- Sumin – lyrics, composition, vocal directing, background vocals (track 5)
- Soyo – lyrics (track 5)
- Charli Taft – composition (track 5)
- Daniel "Obi" Klein – composition, arrangement (track 5)
- Danke – lyrics (track 6)
- Moon Seol-ri – lyrics (track 6)
- Na Jeong-ah (153/Joombas) – lyrics (track 6)
- Yoo Jae-eun (Jam Factory) – lyrics (track 6)
- Flip_00 – composition, arrangement (track 6)
- Isak Alvedahl – composition (track 6)
- 37 – composition, arrangement (track 6)
- Rachael Chevlin – composition, background vocals (track 6)
- MinGtion – vocal directing, background vocals (track 2)
- Choo Dae-kwan a.k.a. DK Choo – vocal directing, Pro Tools operating (track 3, 6)
- 1Take (Newtype) – vocal directing (track 4)
- Kim Hyo-joon – recording (track 1, 5), engineered for mix (track 5)
- Noh Min-ji – recording (track 2–3, 6), digital editing (track 1)
- Jeong Jae-won – recording (track 2), digital editing (track 4)
- Kim Joo-hyun – recording (track 3–4), digital editing (track 2)
- Jeong Ho-jin – recording (track 3, 6), digital editing (track 6)
- Lee Min-kyu – recording (track 4), digital editing (track 5)
- Kim Kwang-min – recording (track 5)
- Son Ah-hyun – recording (track 5)
- Jang Woo-young – digital editing (track 1)
- Eugene Kwon – digital editing (track 2, 4)
- Lee Ji-hong – digital editing, engineered for mix (track 3, 6)
- Kim Cheol-sun – mixing (track 1)
- Jeong Yoo-ra – mixing (track 2)
- Kim Han-koo – mixing (track 3)
- Jung Eui-seok – mixing (track 4)
- Koo Jong-pil – mixing (track 5)
- Hong Jang-mi – mixing assistant (track 5)
- Nam Koong-jin – mixing (track 6)
- Chris Gehringer – mastering (all tracks)

== Charts ==
=== Weekly charts ===
Weekly chart performance for Cosmic
Chart (2024)	Peak position
French Albums (SNEP)	126
Greek Albums (IFPI)	7
Japanese Albums (Oricon)	15
Japanese Combined Albums (Oricon)	20
Japanese Hot Albums (Billboard Japan)	13
South Korean Albums (Circle)	3
UK Album Downloads (Official Charts)	40
US Billboard 200	145
US Independent Albums (Billboard)	20
US World Albums (Billboard)	4

=== Monthly charts ===
Monthly chart performance for Cosmic
Chart (2024)	Peak position
Japanese Albums (Oricon)	43
South Korean Albums (Circle)	11

=== Year-end charts ===
Year-end chart performance for Cosmic
Chart (2024)	Position
South Korean Albums (Circle)	99

== Release history ==
Release history for Cosmic
Region	Date	Format	Version	Label
South Korea	June 24, 2024	CD	Standard	SM; Kakao
Various	June 24, 2024	Digital download; streaming	Standard	SM; Kakao
South Korea	August 1, 2024	CD	Cosmie	SM; Kakao
Various	August 1, 2024	Digital download; streaming	Cosmie	SM; Kakao
