= Red Velvet (group) =

South Korean girl group

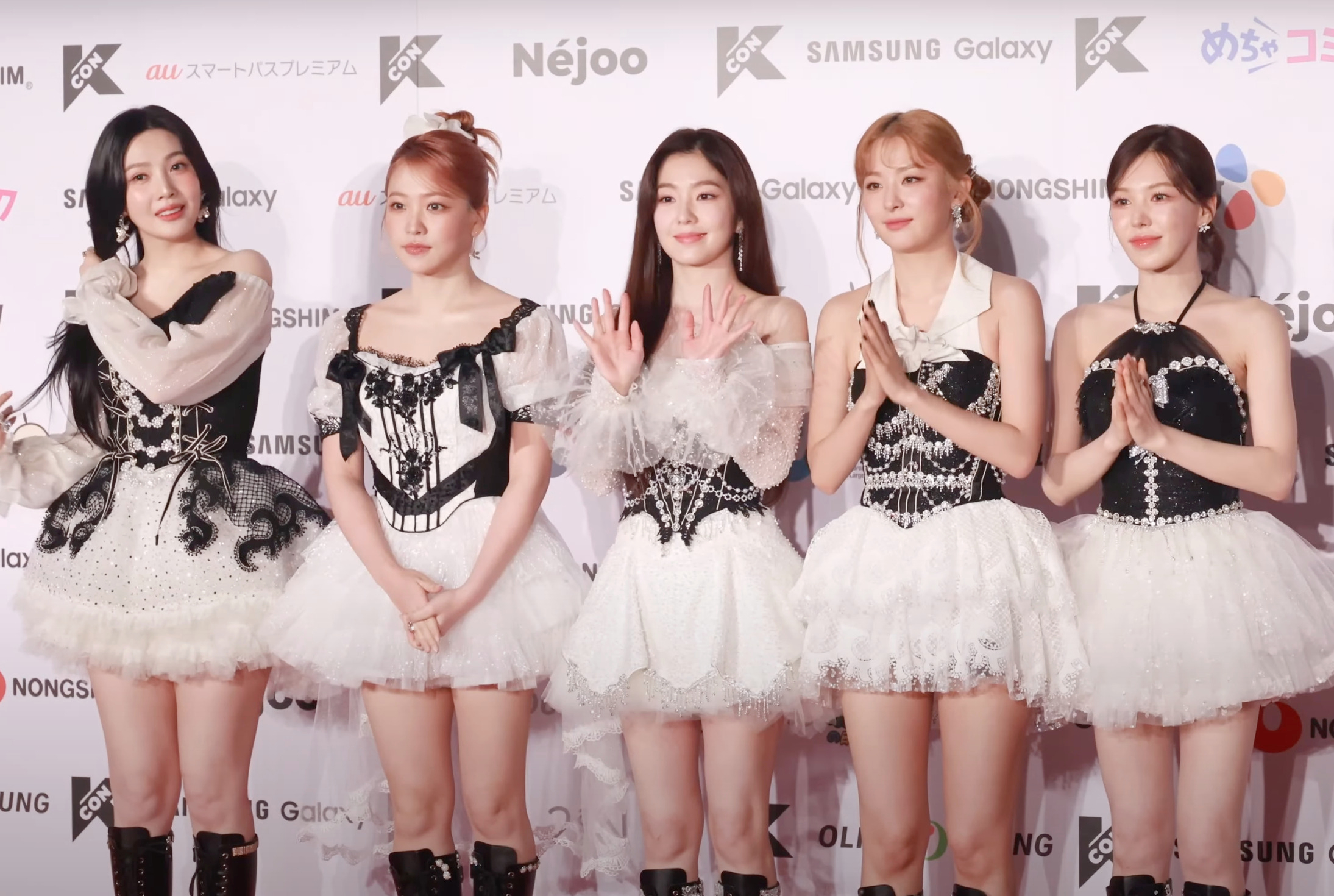
- Red Velvet in May 2024; From left to right: Joy, Yeri, Irene, Seulgi, and Wendy

Background information
- Origin: Seoul, South Korea
- Genres: K-pop; R&B; electropop; dance-pop
- Works: Discography; live performances
- Years active: 2014–present
- Labels: SM; Avex Trax
- Spinoffs: Red Velvet – Irene & Seulgi
- Spinoff of: SM Rookies
- Members: Irene; Seulgi; Wendy; Joy; Yeri
- Website: www.smentertainment.com/artist/red-velvet

Red Velvet (Korean: 레드벨벳) is a South Korean girl group formed and managed by SM Entertainment. They originally debuted on August 1, 2014, with the single "Happiness" with the four-member line-up of Irene, Seulgi, Wendy, and Joy. A fifth member, Yeri, joined in March 2015, with the release of their first extended play, the chart-topping Ice Cream Cake. Sonically, the music of Red Velvet reflects their group name: their predominantly-pop "red" side experiments occasionally with electronic and funk, while their "velvet" side focuses on '90s-influenced R&B with elements of ballad and hip hop.

Red Velvet's Korean-language discography includes three studio albums, one reissue album, one compilation album, and thirteen extended plays—several of which have topped the South Korean Circle Album Chart. Their singles "Red Flavor" and "Power Up" were number one hits on the Gaon Digital Chart, whilst "Dumb Dumb", "Russian Roulette", "Rookie", "Peek-a-Boo", "Bad Boy", "Psycho", and "Feel My Rhythm" all reached the top three. The group also ventured into the Japanese music scene with the extended plays #Cookie Jar (2018) and Sappy (2019) as well as the studio album Bloom (2022).

Red Velvet have received numerous accolades, most notably the Golden Disc New Artist Award in 2015, the Mnet Asian Music Award for Best Female Group in 2017, the Korean Music Award for Best Pop Song in 2018, and the Asia Artist Award for Song of the Year in 2019. Their wide domestic influence has been recognized by Forbes Korea Power Celebrity (placing 11th in 2018 and fifth in 2019); internationally, they were named one of the most popular K-pop groups by Time and Billboard, and the fifth most streamed K-pop artist worldwide on Spotify in February 2020.

== Career ==
=== 2007–2015: Formation, early years and hit breakthrough ===
In 2007, Seulgi was cast as a trainee by SM Entertainment via audition. Irene was cast in 2009, and Yeri in 2011. In 2012, Wendy and Joy were cast through the SM Global Auditions in Canada and Seoul, respectively. Preparations for Red Velvet's debut began in late 2013, with the introduction of Irene and Seulgi in December 2013 and Wendy in March 2014 through SM Entertainment's trainee group SM Rookies. Irene and Seulgi made cameo appearances in the music videos for "1-4-3 (I Love You)" and "Fantastic", respectively, by then-labelmate Henry; Seulgi also featured in Henry's "Butterfly". In March 2014, Wendy, then credited as a member of SR14G, was introduced through the release of "Because I Love You", her first solo soundtrack for the Mnet drama Mimi. Rumors of a group debut gained traction in July, which were subsequently confirmed by SM Entertainment. With the addition of member Joy, the quartet went on to debut in 2014 as SM Entertainment's first girl group in five years and first idol group since 2012.

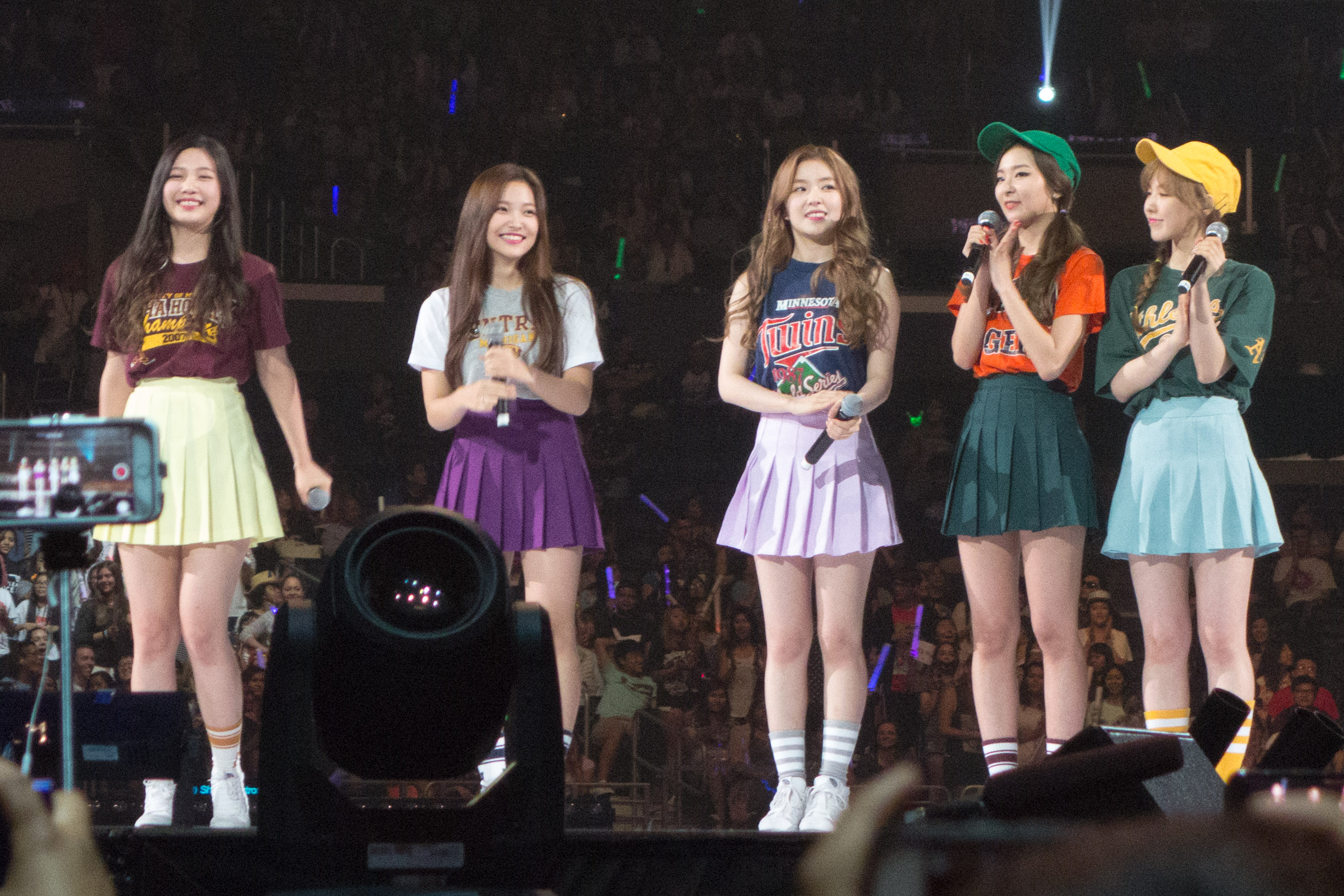
Red Velvet at KCON 2015 in Los Angeles

Red Velvet made their official performance debut on August 1, 2014, on the program Music Bank. Their first single, "Happiness", was released digitally on August 4. It is an urban Europop song with "strong synth sound" and "African tribal beat", penned by Yoo Young-jin and composed by Will Simms, Chad Hugo (The Neptunes), Chris Holsten, and Anne Judith Wik (Dsign Music). The original music video for "Happiness" gained more than two million views on YouTube in its first 24 hours of release before being removed due to controversy over problematic background images and replaced with an edited version. "Happiness" was the second-most viewed K-pop music video worldwide in August 2014. Red Velvet became the first K-pop girl group to chart a debut single on the Billboard World Digital Songs chart, where it peaked at number four. The group released their second digital single "Be Natural" on October 13, 2014. The song, which includes a rap verse from then-SR14B member Taeyong, was a remake of the 2000 single of the same name by S.E.S., SM Entertainment's first girl group. The music video for the song was directed by Kwon Soon-wook and Shim Jae-won, choreographed by Kyle Hanagami, and featured original choreography seen in a pre-debut SM Rookies teaser of Irene and Seulgi. The group began promoting the release on October 9, making their first appearance on M Countdown. The song peaked at number 33 on the Gaon Digital Chart and at number six on the Billboard World Digital Songs chart. Red Velvet won Rookie of The Year at the Golden Disk Awards and Seoul Music Awards.

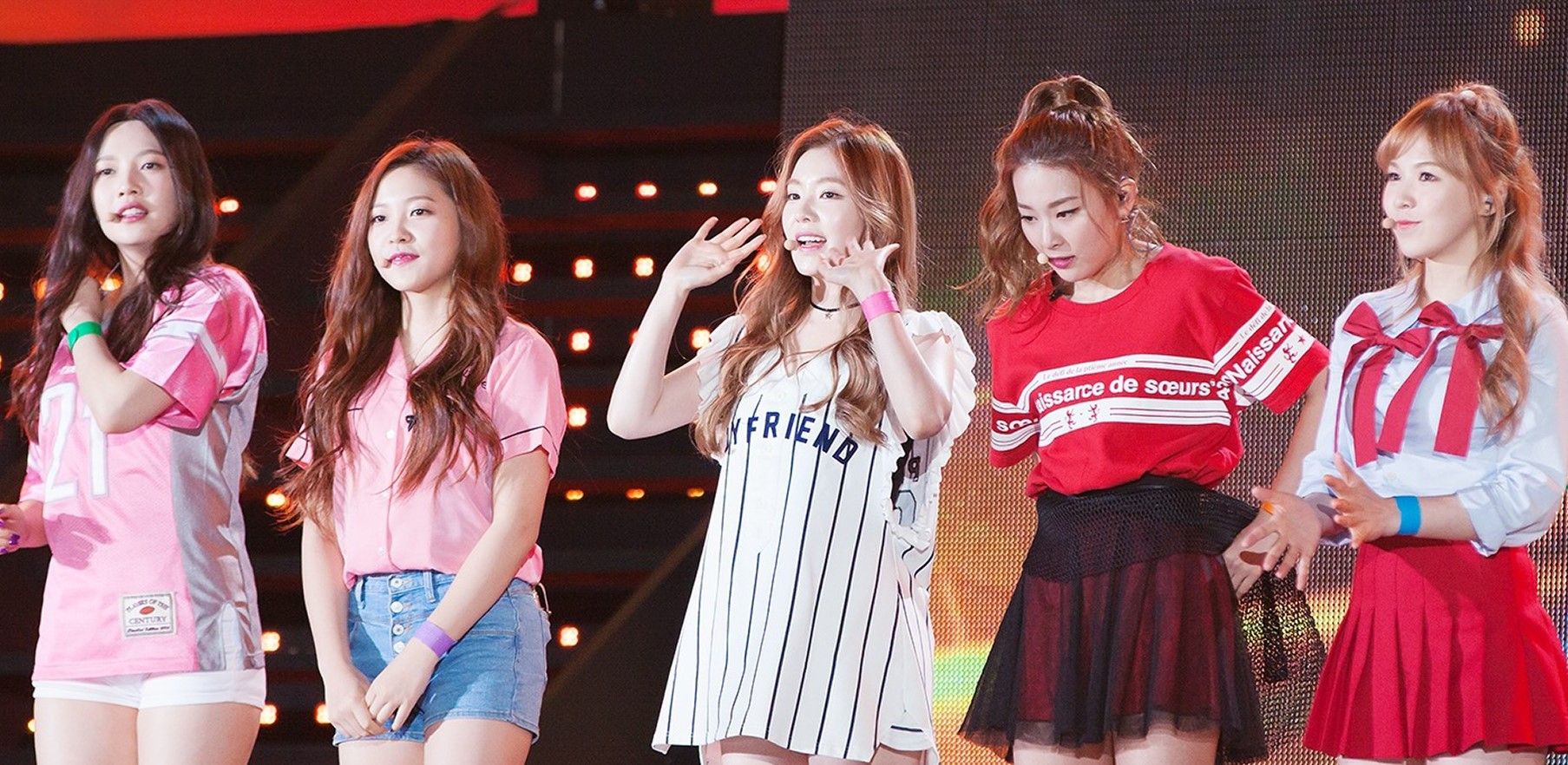
Red Velvet at the Incheon Hallyu K-pop Concert in October 2015

Following news reported that the group was filming in a desert just outside of Palmdale, California, in February 2015, SM Entertainment announced that former SM Rookies member Yeri would officially join the group on March 11, 2015. Yeri had been one of the remaining SM Rookies female trainees to appear in the group's music video for "Happiness" and was first introduced to the public through a Rookie Station video and a group performance on SM Town Live World Tour IV. Preceded by the release of "Automatic", the group's first extended play (EP), Ice Cream Cake, was released on March 17, 2015, to critical and commercial success. The EP's second single, "Ice Cream Cake", marked their commercial breakthrough. On March 19, the group held an album showcase on Ice Cream TV, a program streamed through Naver Music and hosted by Shinee's Minho. On March 27, they won their first music show trophy on KBS' Music Bank, and the EP became the best-selling album by a girl group in South Korea in the first half of 2015 on the Hanteo Chart. In August 2015, Red Velvet held their first US performance during the annual KCON convention and music festival in Los Angeles, California.

The group released their first studio album, The Red, on September 9, 2015, also to critical and commercial success. Billboard's Jeff Benjamin praised The Red "an impressive, solid debut album", stating that it "indicates big things for the act that needs to follow in the footsteps of their beloved female label mates Girls' Generation and f(x)". The album debuted at number one on the Billboard World Albums Chart and South Korea's Gaon Album Chart, and appeared on Billboard's list of the "10 Best K-Pop Albums of 2015". Lead single "Dumb Dumb" peaked at number two on the Gaon Digital Chart and number three on the Billboard World Digital Songs chart, topping the list of the "Top 20 K-pop Tracks of 2015" by Dazed. The music video for "Dumb Dumb" was the only non-English language entry in Rolling Stone's "10 Best Music Videos of 2015". Red Velvet went on to take part in the SM Entertainment's special Christmas project, Winter Garden, releasing a digital single titled "Wish Tree" on December 18, 2015.

=== 2016–2017: The Velvet, Russian Roulette and commercial success ===
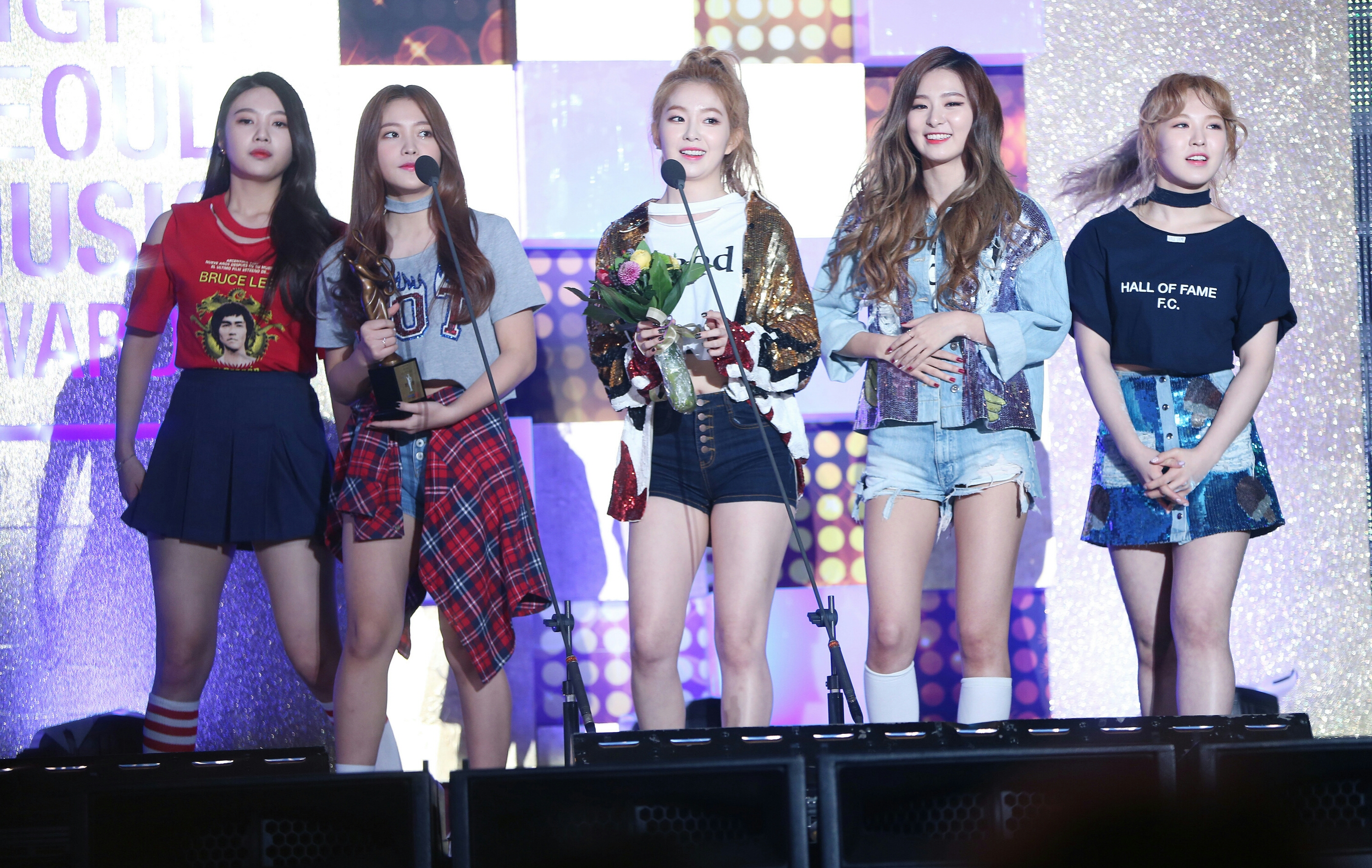
Red Velvet at the 25th Seoul Music Awards in January 2016

Red Velvet's second EP The Velvet was intended to be released on March 16, 2016; however, SM Entertainment announced that the music video and album's release would be delayed "to guarantee a high quality of work". The EP and its lead single "One of These Nights" (7월 7일) was released on March 17. The Velvet showcased the smooth R&B-influenced "velvet" side of the group's concept as a direct follow-up to The Red, which highlighted the group's bright and bold "red" persona. On May 2, Red Velvet released the soundtrack Yossism for the children's animation series Telemonster. The group released their third EP, Russian Roulette, on September 7, 2016. It consists of seven tracks, including the lead single of the same name. On September 13, 2016, Red Velvet won their first music show trophy for "Russian Roulette" on The Show. The song peaked at number two on the Gaon Digital Chart and Billboard's World Digital Songs chart, making it their highest rankings on both charts at the time.

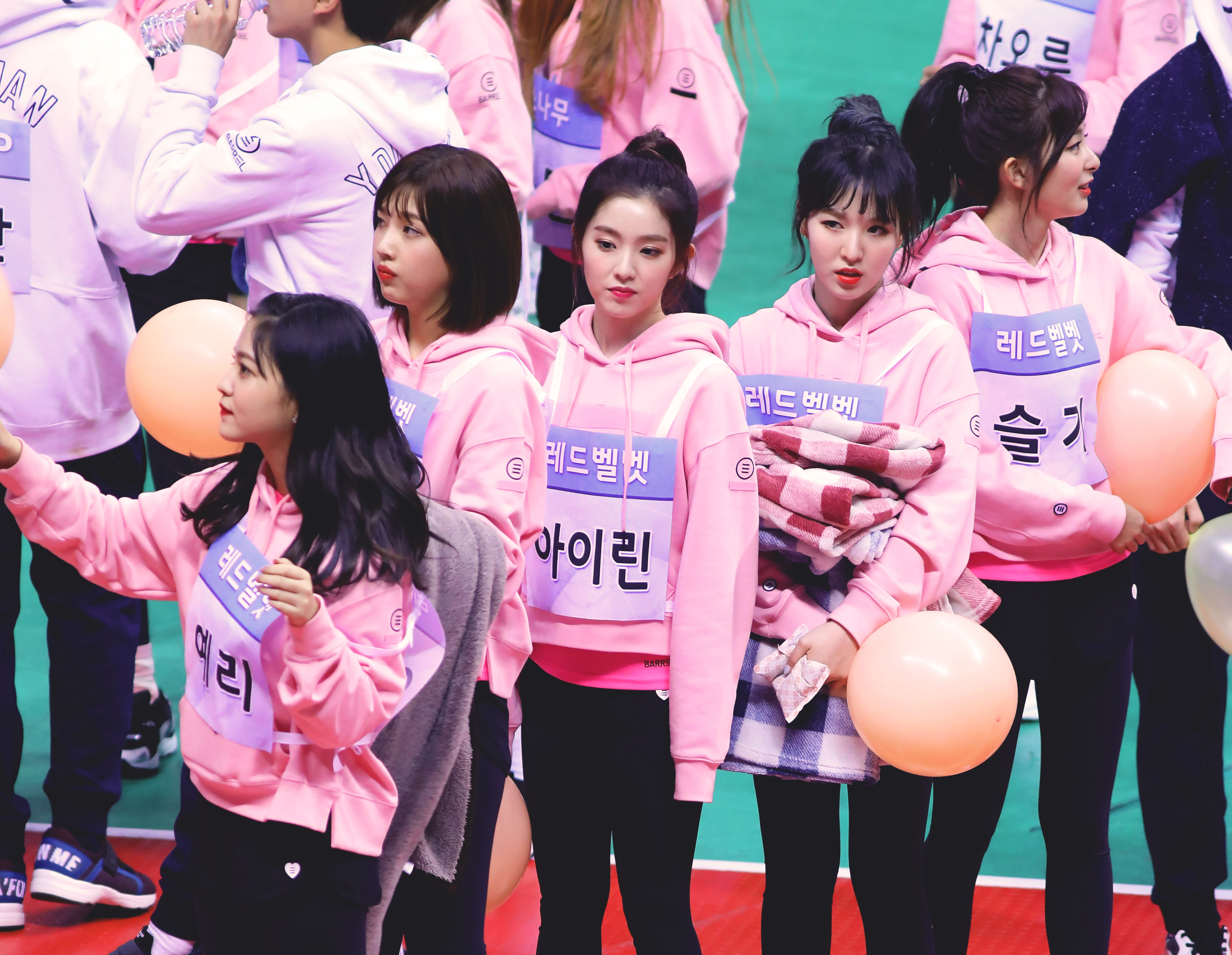
Red Velvet attending the Idol Star Athletics Championships in 2017

On February 1, 2017, Red Velvet released Rookie, a six-track EP, including the lead single "Rookie" and a solo track by Wendy titled "Last Love" (마지막 사랑). The EP topped the weekly Gaon Album Chart as well as the Billboard World Albums Chart. The group won their first music show trophy for "Rookie" on The Show on February 7, followed by wins on Show Champion, M Countdown, Music Bank, and Inkigayo. On March 31, the group released the first single for SM Station 2, titled "Would U". From July 27 to September 10, Red Velvet starred in their first reality television program, Level Up Project, which showcased footage of their trip to Thailand. The show aired for 23 episodes and was shot without member Joy, who was filming the drama The Liar and His Lover, in which she was the female lead. On July 9, 2017, Red Velvet released their first summer EP, The Red Summer, with lead single "Red Flavor" (빨간 맛). The EP was a commercial success, topping the Gaon Album Chart and the Billboard World Albums Chart. It was Red Velvet's third number-one album and set the record for most number one albums on the chart by a K-pop girl group. Additionally, "Red Flavor" debuted atop the Gaon Digital Chart, with the other four songs on the EP also charting in the top 50.

In August 2017, Red Velvet's rendition of Yoon Jong Shin's "Rebirth", made possible by the show Snowball Project, was officially released as part of SM Station. On August 18, the group held their first solo concert, titled Red Room, to an audience of 11,000. Although it was initially planned to be a two-day concert, a third show was added due to demand. On October 4, SM Entertainment announced through their Japanese website that the group would have their first showcase in Japan. The Red Velvet Premium Showcase F'U'N Room Reveluv-Baby Party took place at the Yebisu Garden Hall in Tokyo on November 6. They performed the Japanese versions of their Korean songs "Dumb Dumb" and "Red Flavor" for the first time. After wrapping up the showcase, it was officially announced that Red Velvet's Red Room concerts would be extended to Japan in 2018.

Red Velvet revisited their "velvet" image by releasing their second studio album, Perfect Velvet, on November 17, 2017, with lead single "Peek-a-Boo". Unlike their first "velvet" release, the album and single were both commercially successful. The album peaked atop Billboard's World Albums chart; "Peek-a-Boo" peaked at number two on Billboard's World Digital Songs chart, tying their 2016 single "Russian Roulette". In South Korea, the album and "Peek-a-Boo" both charted at number two on the Gaon Album Chart and Gaon Digital Chart. Through the release of Rookie, The Red Summer and Perfect Velvet in the same year, along with the popularity of the single "Red Flavor" and the success of their albums overseas, Red Velvet achieved "top girl group" status in South Korea. This was further cemented when Perfect Velvet sold over 100,000 copies and "Peek-A-Boo" won first place on the music program Inkigayo on their last day of promotions for the song, proving its longevity on the charts.

=== 2018: Worldwide recognition and Summer Magic ===
The group released a reissue of Perfect Velvet, The Perfect Red Velvet, on January 29, 2018. It included three new tracks, in addition to all the songs from Perfect Velvet, with the single "Bad Boy" promoted as the lead single. The album topped the Gaon Album Chart upon release, while "Bad Boy" debuted at number two on the Gaon Digital Chart. The Perfect Red Velvet also charted at number three on Billboard's World Albums chart, while "Bad Boy" debuted at number two on the World Digital Songs chart. Red Velvet also entered the top 10 of Billboard's Social 50 chart for the first time at number nine. The album also marked the first time the group appeared on the Canadian Hot 100, entering at number 87 and becoming only the seventh K-pop artist and the third female K-pop act to appear on the chart. Red Velvet promoted the song on various South Korean music shows, earning their first music show win for "Bad Boy" on February 8 on Show Champion. In December, Billboard named "Bad Boy" the best K-pop song of the year.

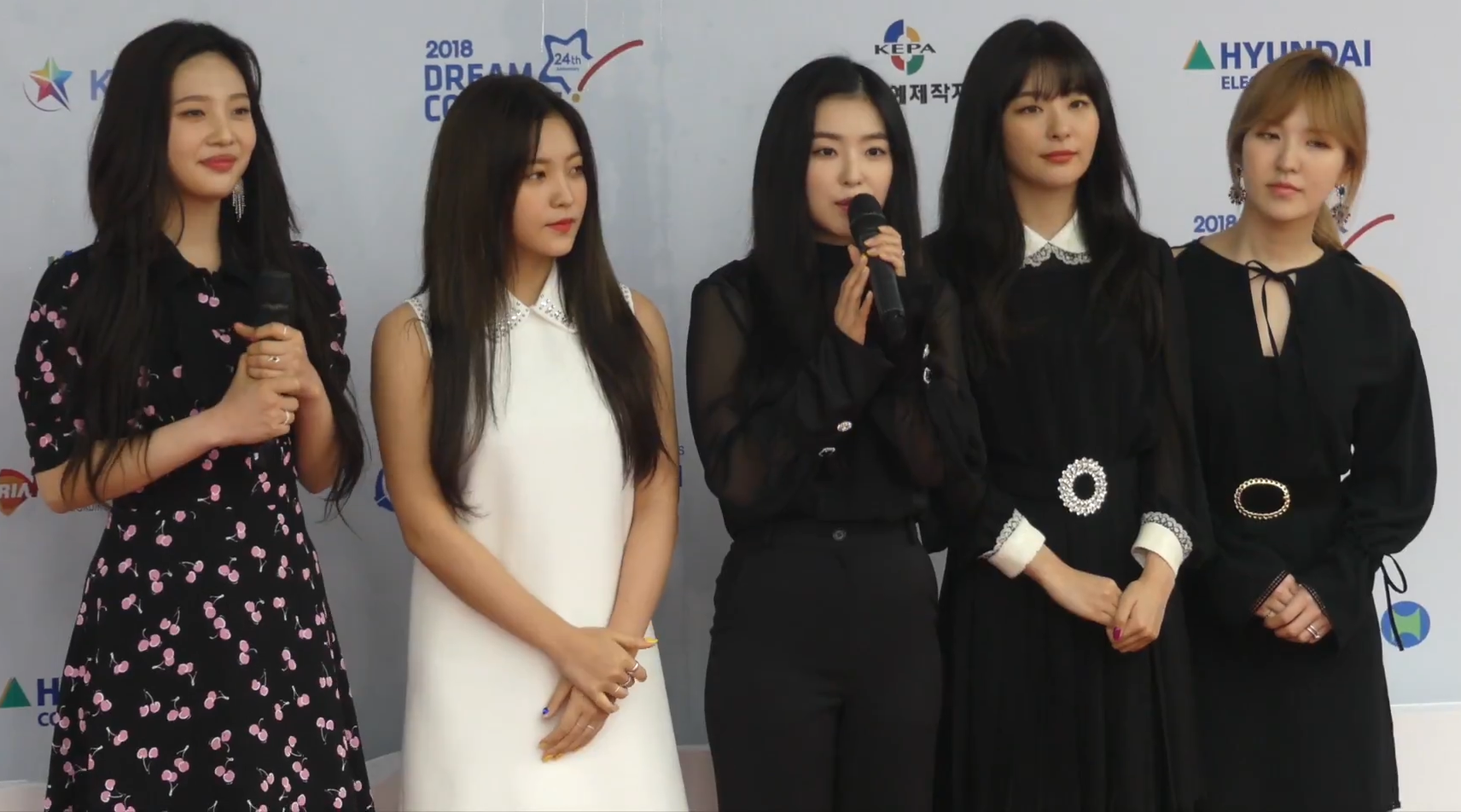
Red Velvet at Dream Concert on May 12, 2018

Red Velvet's solo concert Red Room was held in Tokyo, Japan on March 28 and 29 at the Musashino Forest Sports Plaza, a 10,000-seat capacity venue built for the 2020 Tokyo Olympics. On the second day, the group announced that they would be officially debuting in Japan in July. On April 1, 2018, Red Velvet performed alongside other selected South Korean artists for an inter-Korean concert in Pyongyang, North Korea, making them the first artist from SM Entertainment in fifteen years since Shinhwa to perform in North Korea. Joy was unable to perform with the group due to scheduling conflicts with the filming of Tempted. On April 29, 2018, Red Velvet held their first fan meeting at the Rosemont Theater in Chicago, to an audience of 4,000. The event was first solo performance by a female K-pop group in the United States since 2016. The group later toured six Japanese cities in May and June to a total of 20,000 people. Their debut Japanese EP, #Cookie Jar, was released on July 4, 2018, by label Avex Trax and included six new songs, including the Japanese versions of "Dumb Dumb", "Russian Roulette" and "Red Flavor". Other songs on the album were "#Cookie Jar","Aitai-tai", and "Cause It's You". The EP debuted at number three on the Oricon Weekly Albums chart and sold 26,124 copies in its first week of release in Japan.

On July 19, 2018, Red Velvet announced that they would be making a comeback and that they had filmed their music video outdoors in Gyeonggi-do. The songs from the new album were performed at Red Velvet's second concert, Redmare, held in Seoul from August 4 to 5. On August 6, Red Velvet released their second summer EP, Summer Magic, containing eight tracks, including one bonus track and one iTunes exclusive track. Its lead single "Power Up" earned the group a "perfect all-kill" for the first time in their career when it topped all of South Korea's real-time, daily and weekly music charts upon release. The music video for "Power Up" was the only K-pop music video on Billboard's list of 50 best music videos of 2018. In September and October, the group brought their Redmare concerts to Bangkok, Taipei and Singapore. Red Velvet released their third album in the year and fifth EP overall on November 30. The six-track EP, RBB, was supported by lead single "RBB (Really Bad Boy)" and its English version.

=== 2019–2021: The ReVe Festival trilogy and Queendom ===
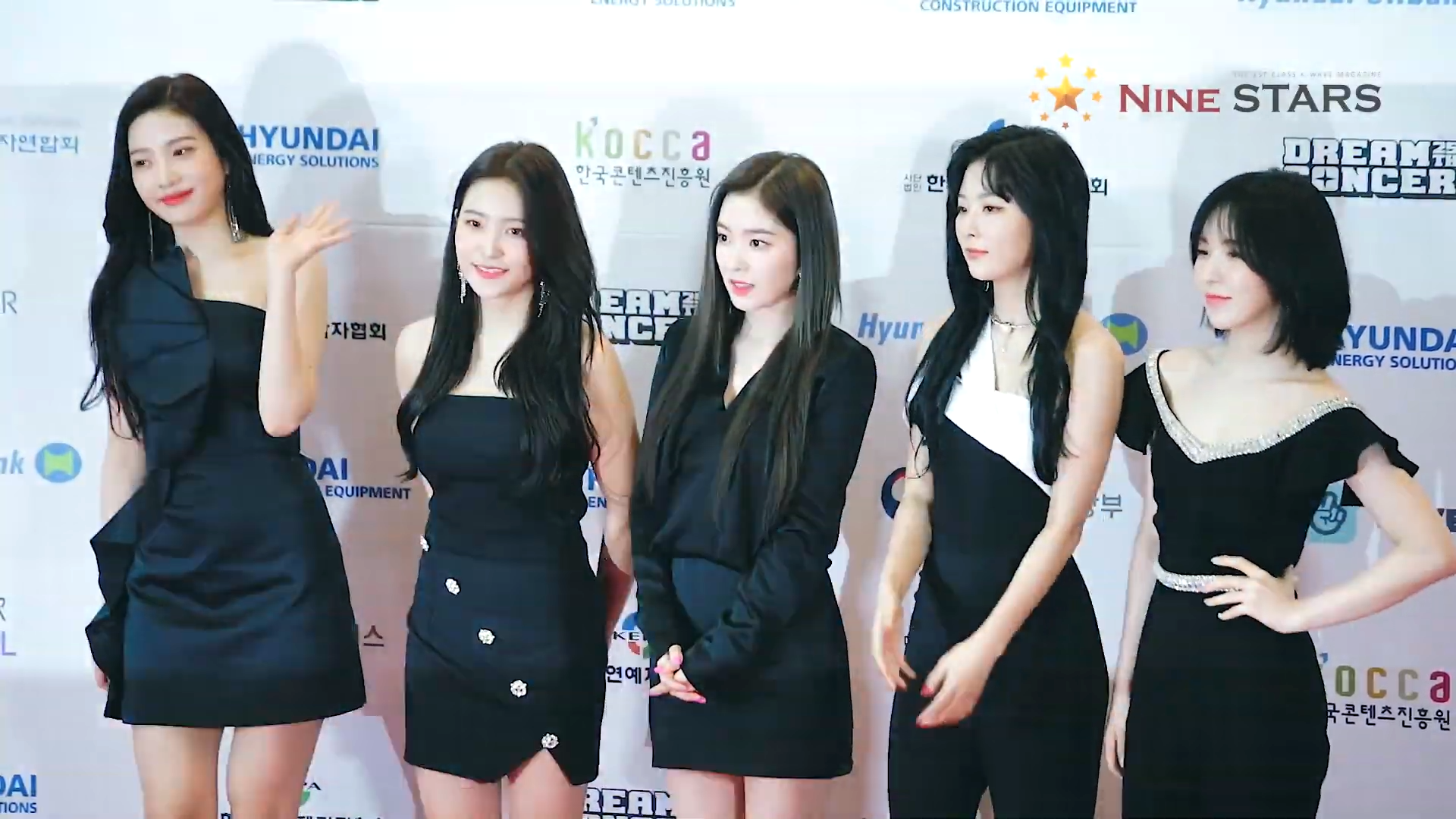
Red Velvet at Dream Concert on May 18, 2019

On January 6, 2019, Red Velvet released their first Japanese digital single, "Sappy". They released another Japanese single, "Sayonara", on February 20. Both were included in their second Japanese EP, Sappy, released on May 29; the EP also included Japanese versions of "Peek-a-Boo", "Rookie" and "Power Up", as well as the original song "Swimming Pool". In February, Red Velvet embarked on the North American leg of their Redmare Tour. They held shows in Los Angeles, Dallas, Miami, Chicago and Newark in the United States and Toronto and Vancouver in Canada, becoming the first K-pop girl group to hold a North American tour in three years. On April 5, Red Velvet were featured on a remixed version of "Close to Me" by Ellie Goulding and Diplo, with members Yeri and Wendy contributing Korean lyrics to the song. The song won Choice Electronic/Dance Song at the 2019 Teen Choice Awards.

On June 19, Red Velvet released the EP The ReVe Festival: Day 1, which featured the lead single "Zimzalabim" and served as the first entry of The ReVe Festival trilogy. Commercially, the CD version of the EP debuted atop the Gaon Weekly Album Chart, and sold 156,993 copies by the end of 2019 in South Korea, placing thirty-seventh for the year. It was followed by the second EP of the series, The ReVe Festival: Day 2, and its lead single "Umpah Umpah" on August 20. The album was a commercial success and debuted atop of Gaon Weekly Album Chart, becoming the group's tenth number one album on the chart and extending their record as the girl group with most number one albums on the chart. The CD version of the EP debuted on the monthly chart of Gaon Album Chart with 107,554 copies sold; became the fourth best-selling album of the month August 2019; and placed fifty-first for the year, with 111,654 copies sold. In the same month, Red Velvet also released a soundtrack, titled "See the Stars", for the tvN drama Hotel Del Luna. On November 26, "Umpah Umpah" won Song of the Year at the 2019 Asia Artist Awards. The final release of the trilogy, The ReVe Festival: Finale, was released on December 23 as a repackage of two previous EPs, led by the single "Psycho". In November 2020, "Psycho" received platinum certification from the Korea Music Content Association for surpassing 100 million streams. To promote The ReVe Festival trilogy, the group embarked on their third tour, La Rouge, which began in Seoul on November 23 and 24. In early 2020, La Rouge continued as an arena tour in Japan without Wendy, who was injured in a stage accident during rehearsals at the 2019 SBS Gayo Daejeon on December 25. After three dates in Japan, the final two La Rouge concerts at Yokohama were postponed due to the COVID-19 pandemic.

In 2020, Red Velvet were featured in the animated musical film Trolls World Tour, in which they represented the K-pop trolls, and their song "Russian Roulette" was featured in the film. The film had the biggest digital debut of all time and broke streaming records. On August 21, Red Velvet released their SM Station single, a cover of BoA's "Milky Way", as part of a project celebrating BoA's 20th debut anniversary. The release also marked Wendy's partial return to the group, eight months after her stage accident. On October 17, Red Velvet released another soundtrack for the tvN drama Start-Up, titled "Future". Red Velvet was the fifth most-streamed K-pop artist on Spotify in 2020.

On January 1, 2021, the group returned as five members after a one year of hiatus due to Wendy's injuries, for SM Town Live Culture Humanity, an online concert broadcast live. On August 16, they released their sixth Korean EP, Queendom, alongside the lead single of the same name. In South Korea, the EP debuted at number two on the Gaon Album Chart. The EP debuted at number 17 on the UK Digital Albums, and at number 41 on Billboard Japan Hot Albums chart. In the United States, Queendom debuted at numbers 16 and 11 on Billboard's Heatseekers Albums and World Albums chart, respectively.

=== 2022–2023: The ReVe Festival 2022, the R to V Tour, and Chill Kill ===
On February 21, 2022, it was announced that the group would hold a special live concert titled The ReVe Festival: Prologue on March 19–20. The event was postponed until further notice as Irene, Joy, and Yeri tested positive for COVID-19 on March 14. On March 21, they released the EP The ReVe Festival 2022 – Feel My Rhythm, a sequel of their 2019 trilogy The ReVe Festival, alongside lead single "Feel My Rhythm". By March 20, 2022, it was reported that The ReVe Festival 2022 – Feel My Rhythm accumulated 516,866 total pre-orders, a career high for Red Velvet, making them half-million sellers. The EP debuted at number two on the Gaon Weekly Album Chart in the chart issue dated March 20–26, 2022, before peaking at number one in the chart issue dated April 10–16, 2022, becoming the group's twelfth number-one album and extending their record as the girl group with the most number-one albums on the chart. As of April 2022, The ReVe Festival 2022 – Feel My Rhythm sold 653,610 copies on the Gaon Chart, making it the group's best-selling physical release of their career. It was certified Double Platinum domestically for selling over 500,000 copies.

Red Velvet's first Japanese studio album, Bloom, featuring the lead single "Wildside", was released on April 6, 2022. Bloom debuted at number five on Japan's weekly Oricon Albums Chart in the chart issue dated April 4–10, 2022. It also peaked at number two on the component daily albums chart, and at number two on the Billboard Japan Hot Albums chart.

The group released the EP The ReVe Festival 2022 – Birthday, alongside the lead single "Birthday", on November 28, 2022. On December 14, 2022, the group released the collaborative single "Beautiful Christmas" with labelmates Aespa for SM Town's album 2022 Winter SM Town: SMCU Palace.

In March 2023, SM announced that the group's fourth concert tour, R to V, would start in early April at KSPO Dome in Seoul. In August 2023, SM confirmed that Seulgi had renewed her contract with SM, although the duration of the renewal was not specified. In September 2023, SM confirmed that the group would be releasing their third studio album in November, marking it as the group's first Korean studio album release in six years after Perfect Velvet in 2017. On October 18, Red Velvet announced their third studio album Chill Kill would be released on November 13. The album contains ten tracks including the lead single of the same name.

On December 31, 2023, Red Velvet members Irene, Seulgi, and Wendy performed in the Philippines for the New Year's Countdown held in Bonifacio Global City (BGC), Taguig. Irene and Seulgi performed as a subunit whereas Wendy performed as a soloist.

=== 2024–present: Cosmic and Velvet Summer ===
On June 10, 2024, it was announced that Red Velvet would be making a comeback on June 24 with the EP Cosmic. The lead single of the same name and its music video were released along with the album. It was also announced that Red Velvet would be embarking on their tenth anniversary fancon tour, Happiness: My Dear, ReVe1uv, from August 3 in Seoul. On July 5, SM announced that there would be an additional performance on August 2 in Seoul for the fancon tour due to selling out of all tickets for the original dates. On July 15, it was announced that Red Velvet would be releasing a new version of Cosmic on August 1, the day of their tenth anniversary, with the addition of a new fan song "Sweet Dreams".

On April 4, 2025, SM Entertainment announced that its exclusive contracts with members Wendy and Yeri had ended, but the two will remain in the group and be involved in all future group activities.

On July 6, 2026, it was announced that Red Velvet would be making a comeback on August 3 with the third summer special EP Velvet Summer, with the lead single "Surfin' Boy", making it their first full-group release in two years.

== Members ==
- Irene (아이린)
- Seulgi (슬기)
- Wendy (웬디)
- Joy (조이)
- Yeri (예리)

=== Timeline ===
Note: Yeri officially joined Red Velvet on March 11, 2015.

== Sub-unit and solo endeavors ==
On April 21, 2020, SM Entertainment confirmed the formation of Red Velvet's first sub-unit, Red Velvet – Irene & Seulgi, composed of members Irene and Seulgi. The duo released their debut extended play, Monster, on July 6.

Wendy was the first member of Red Velvet to debut as a soloist; her debut EP Like Water was released on April 5, 2021. The five-track album includes a duet titled "Best Friend" with Seulgi, as well as the lead single "Like Water", which compares one's existence and meaning to water and how it flows like fate. It conveyed a message of gratitude for the people who stood by her and hope for a new journey. Joy was the second member to make a solo debut, releasing her debut EP Hello on May 31, 2021. It featured six remakes of songs from 1990s and 2000s, including the lead single "Hello", originally released by Park Hye-kyung in 2003. Seulgi was the third member to debut as a soloist, releasing her first EP 28 Reasons on October 4, 2022. Irene, the fourth member to debut as a soloist, released her first EP Like a Flower on November 26, 2024.

== Artistry ==
=== Musical styles and themes ===
"Red Flavor"
"Red Flavor" is an electropop song with dramatic synths and a percussive melody.

"Bad Boy"
"Bad Boy" is an R&B song with elements of hip hop.

Red Velvet's music and public image play on contrasting "red" and "velvet" sides. The "red" side showcases a bubbly and vibrant image, while their "velvet" side is more mature and elegant. Their recent work mixes both sides to convey sensuality, color, and sophistication. Musically, the "red" side is predominantly of the pop genre, and their "velvet" is primarily R&B and ballads; however, the group also experiments with other genres. Red Velvet's dual concept also affects the members' styling. In their "red" concept, they are usually dressed in colorful clothing, such as pastel sweaters and skirts in "Ice Cream Cake" and red doll costumes in "Dumb Dumb". They are dressed more maturely for their "velvet" side, such as their suits in "Be Natural".

=== Image and reception ===
Red Velvet have been lauded for breaking stereotypes among popular girl groups in South Korea, who tend to fall under either "cute and pure" or "sexy". In a country where girl groups' fanbases are mostly male, Taylor Glasby of Dazed Digital noted that the majority of Red Velvet's fans are young women. IZE named the group as one of the successful female figures who helped transform the "passive image" of South Korean women in 2017. Red Velvet's musical versatility has led to recognition by Time magazine as one of the genre's standout K-pop groups. Janelle Okwodu from Vogue wrote that throughout their career, "the critically acclaimed South Korean girl group has dominated the charts with their innovative pop sound". Billboard reported that Red Velvet were the overall favorite K-pop group of 2018 among fans of every gender and sexual identity on the genre-specific community on popular internet forum Reddit.

Red Velvet have topped the Girl Group Brand Power Ranking, published by the Korean Corporate Reputation Research Institute, several times. In November 2019, Billboard crowned Red Velvet as "the best idol group alive" and named "Red Flavor" as the second-best K-pop song of the 2010s. Red Velvet's performance in Pyongyang in 2018—which made them the seventh idol group to perform in North Korea and the first since 2003—was part of a wider diplomatic initiative between South Korea and North Korea and earned the group a commendation from South Korea's Ministry of Culture, Sports and Tourism for their contributions in spreading South Korean popular culture. Discussing the Korean Wave in 2018, the director of the Korea Foundation for International Cultural Exchange cited Red Velvet as a major contributor and one of the country's most talented idol groups who have "largely promoted K-pop" around the world. In 2024, Red Velvet was ranked at number 8 in a Gallup Korea survey of the most popular girl groups of the 21st century, tied with Aespa and Kara.

In an interview with Julienne Loreto of JoySauce published on November 19, 2025, Filipino girl group Bini revealed that Red Velvet was their management's original inspiration for the group, specifically because of Red Velvet's "duality". Other artists influenced by Red Velvet include @onefive.

== Discography ==
Korean albums

- The Red (2015)
- Perfect Velvet (2017)
- Chill Kill (2023)

Japanese albums

- Bloom (2022)

== Filmography ==
=== Film ===
Year	Title	Role	Note	Ref.
2015	SMTown: The Stage	Themselves	Biographical film	
2020	Trolls World Tour	K-Pop Sisters: Wani, Baby Bun, Gomdori, Ari and Kim-Petit	Animated, musical comedy film	

=== Reality show ===
Year	Title	Role	Notes	Ref.
2017–2020, 2022, 2026	Level Up Project!	Main cast	6 seasons	

=== Video albums ===
- Red Velvet DVD & Blu-ray Red Velvet 1st Concert "Red Room" in Japan
- Red Velvet DVD & Blu-ray " Red Velvet 2nd Concert "Redmare" in Japan

== Tours and concerts ==
=== Headlining ===
- Red Room (2017–2018)
- Redmare (2018–2019)
- La Rouge (2019–2020)
- R to V (2023)

=== Fan-concert ===
- Happiness: My Dear, ReVe1uv (2024)
- A Day in Red & Velvet (2026)

=== Concert participation ===
- SM Town Live World Tour IV (2014–2015)
- SM Town Live World Tour V (2016)
- SM Town Live World Tour VI (2017–2018)
- A-nation Online 2020 (2020)
- SM Town Live Culture Humanity (2021)
- SM Town Live 2022: SMCU Express at Kwangya (2022)
- SM Town Live 2022: SMCU Express at Human City Suwon (2022)
- SM Town Live 2022: SMCU Express at Tokyo (2022)
- SM Town Live 2023: SMCU Palace at Kwangya (2023)
- SM Town Live 2025: The Culture, the Future (2025)

== See also ==
- List of best-selling girl groups
