= R to V =

2023 concert tour by Red Velvet

Red Velvet 4th Concert "R to V"
- Tour by Red Velvet
- Associated album: The ReVe Festival 2022
- Start date: April 1, 2023
- End date: June 6, 2023
- Legs: 2
- No. of shows: 7 in Asia; 4 in Europe; 11 in total

Red Velvet concert chronology
- La Rouge (2019–20); R to V (2023); Happiness: My Dear, ReVe1uv (2024)

R to V (stylized as Red Velvet 4th Concert 'R to V') was the fourth concert tour headlined by South Korean girl group Red Velvet, in support of their The ReVe Festival 2022 EPs Feel My Rhythm and Birthday. The tour began on April 1, 2023, in Seoul, South Korea and concluded on June 6, 2023 in London, England. The tour consisted of 11 concerts in 9 cities in 9 countries around Asia and Europe. It also marked the group's first in-person concert tour in three years since the "La Rouge Tour".

== Background ==
Prior to the release of The ReVe Festival 2022 – Feel My Rhythm, Red Velvet planned to hold special live concert "2022 The ReVe Festival: Prologue" at the SK Olympic Handball Stadium on March 19 to 20, but was canceled after members Irene, Joy, and Yeri were tested positive for COVID-19.

On March 3, 2023, SM Entertainment announced the tour titled "R to V" would begin from April 1, 2023, starting with two shows in Seoul, before heading to Singapore on April 21, followed by two shows in Japan on May 3 and 4, Philippines on May 7, two shows in Bangkok on May 13 and 14, Jakarta on May 20, Paris on May 24, Berlin on May 27, Amsterdam on May 30, and ending in London on June 6.

On April 26, it was announced that Joy would take a break due her poor health condition with the remaining shows continuing as a four-member group. On May 12, it was announced that Bangkok shows would be postponed indefinitely after Wendy was tested positive for COVID-19. On May 31, it was announced that Bangkok shows would be canceled due to rescheduling issues. A concert photobook of the R to V tour will be released on January 18, 2024.

== Introduction ==
The concert was themed "R to V", presenting a bright and breezy "Red" style and a capable "Velvet" style stage.

== Reception ==
The Guardian gave the Wembley Arena concert in London five stars out of five, writing that "Despite Joy's absence, the show doesn't suffer. The perfection is mesmerizing: even though their music is the kind that gets you moving, this is a theatrical spectacle you sit down to watch." WhyNow gave the same concert four stars out of five.

== Setlist ==
Set list in Seoul (April 1, 2023)
1. "Feel My Rhythm"
2. "Bamboleo"
3. "LP"
4. "Ice Cream Cake"
5. "Oh Boy"
6. "On a Ride"
7. "Eyes Locked, Hands Locked"
8. "Queendom"
9. "Bing Bing"
10. "Birthday"
11. "Red Flavor"
12. "Pose"
13. "Beg For Me"
14. "Zoom"
15. "Bye Bye"
16. "In & Out"
17. "I Just"
18. "Peek-A-Boo"
19. "Bad Boy"
20. "Psycho"
  Encore
21. "Celebrate"
22. "My Dear"
23. "Russian Roulette"
24. "You Better Know"
Set list in Seoul (April 2, 2023)
1. "Pose"
2. "Beg For Me"
3. "Zoom"
4. "Bye Bye"
5. "In & Out"
6. "I Just"
7. "Peek-A-Boo"
8. "Bad Boy"
9. "Psycho"
10. "Feel My Rhythm"
11. "Bamboleo"
12. "LP"
13. "Ice Cream Cake"
14. "Oh Boy"
15. "On a Ride"
16. "Eyes Locked, Hands Locked"
17. "Queendom"
18. "Bing Bing"
19. "Birthday"
20. "Red Flavor"
  Encore
21. "Celebrate"
22. "My Dear"
23. "Russian Roulette"
24. "Zimzalabim"
25. "You Better Know"
Set list in Japan (May 3 & 4, 2023)
1. "Feel My Rhythm"
2. "Bamboleo"
3. "LP"
4. "Ice Cream Cake"
5. "Oh Boy"
6. "On a Ride"
7. "Eyes Locked, Hands Locked"
8. "Queendom"
9. "Bing Bing"
10. "Birthday"
11. "Red Flavor"
12. "Pose"
13. "Beg For Me"
14. "Zoom"
15. "Bye Bye"
16. "WILDSIDE"
17. "I Just"
18. "Peek-A-Boo"
19. "Bad Boy"
20. "Psycho"
  Encore
21. "Color of Love"
22. "Swimming Pool"
23. "Aitai-tai"
24. "Zimzalabim"
25. "You Better Know"

== Shows ==
List of concert dates
Date	City	Country	Venue	Attendance
April 1, 2023	Seoul	South Korea	KSPO Dome	14,000
April 2, 2023	Seoul	South Korea	KSPO Dome	14,000
April 21, 2023	Singapore		The Star Performing Arts Centre	4,000
May 3, 2023	Yokohama	Japan	Pia Arena MM	—
May 4, 2023	Yokohama	Japan	Pia Arena MM	—
May 7, 2023	Manila	Philippines	SM Mall of Asia Arena	10,000
May 20, 2023	Jakarta	Indonesia	Indonesia Convention Exhibition	—
May 24, 2023	Paris	France	La Seine Musicale	—
May 27, 2023	Berlin	Germany	Verti Music Hall	—
May 30, 2023	Amsterdam	Netherlands	AFAS Live	—
June 6, 2023	London	England	OVO Arena Wembley	—
Total				N/A

=== Canceled shows ===
List of canceled dates
Date	City	Country	Venue	Reason
May 13, 2023	Bangkok	Thailand	Thunder Dome	Joy's hiatus & Wendy testing positive for COVID-19
May 14, 2023	Bangkok	Thailand	Thunder Dome	Joy's hiatus & Wendy testing positive for COVID-19

== Gallery ==
Amsterdam concert gallery
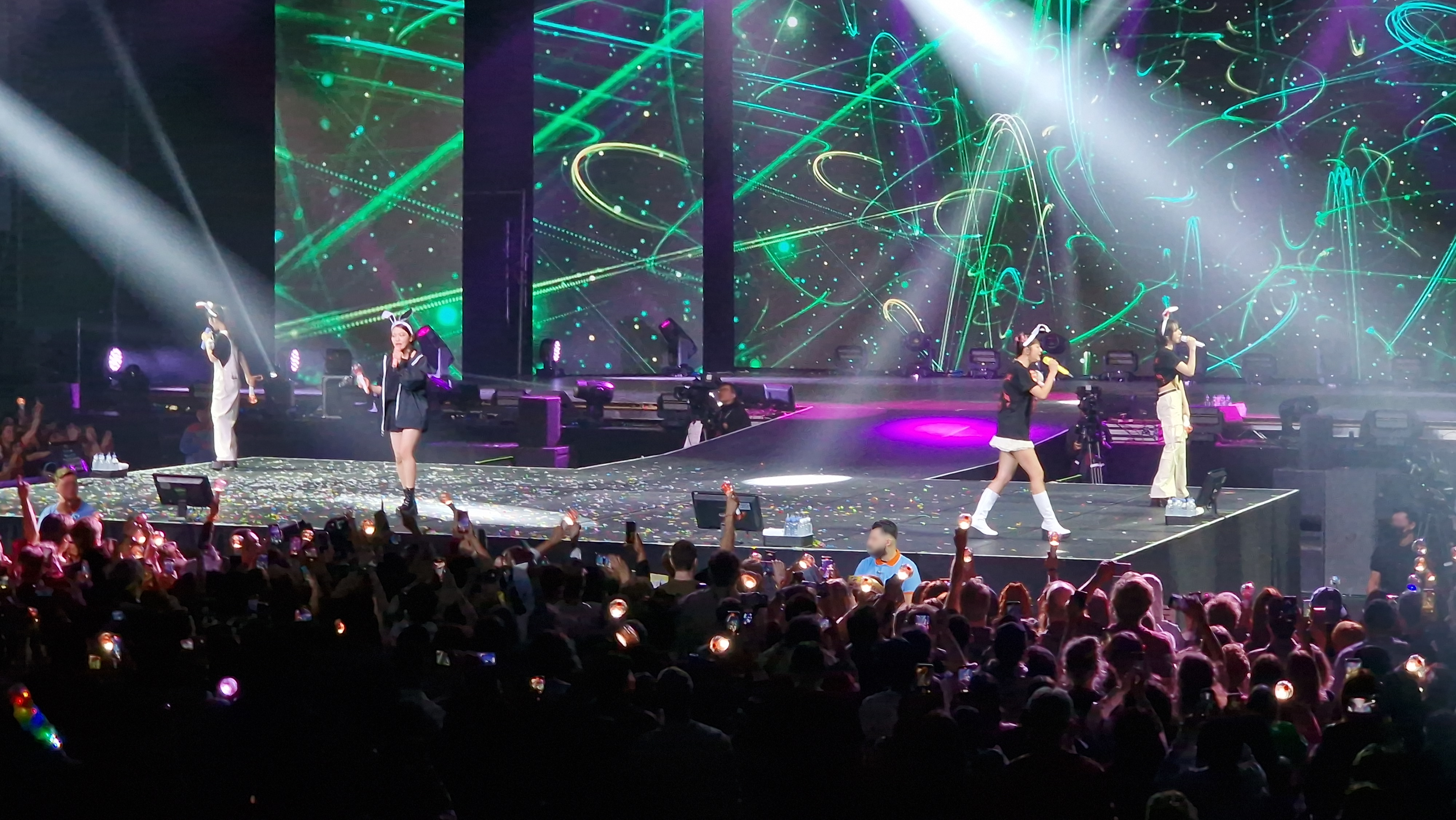

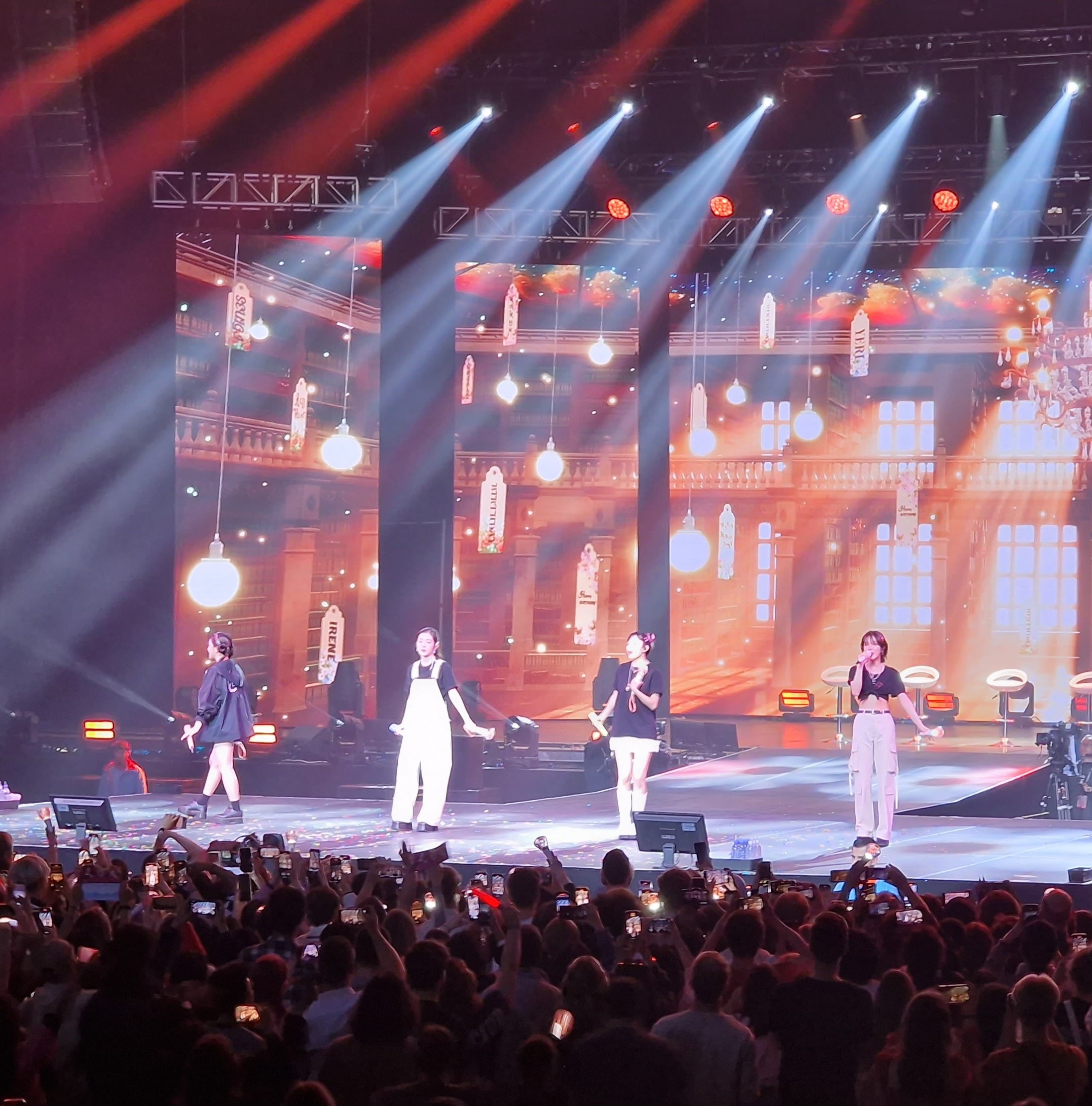

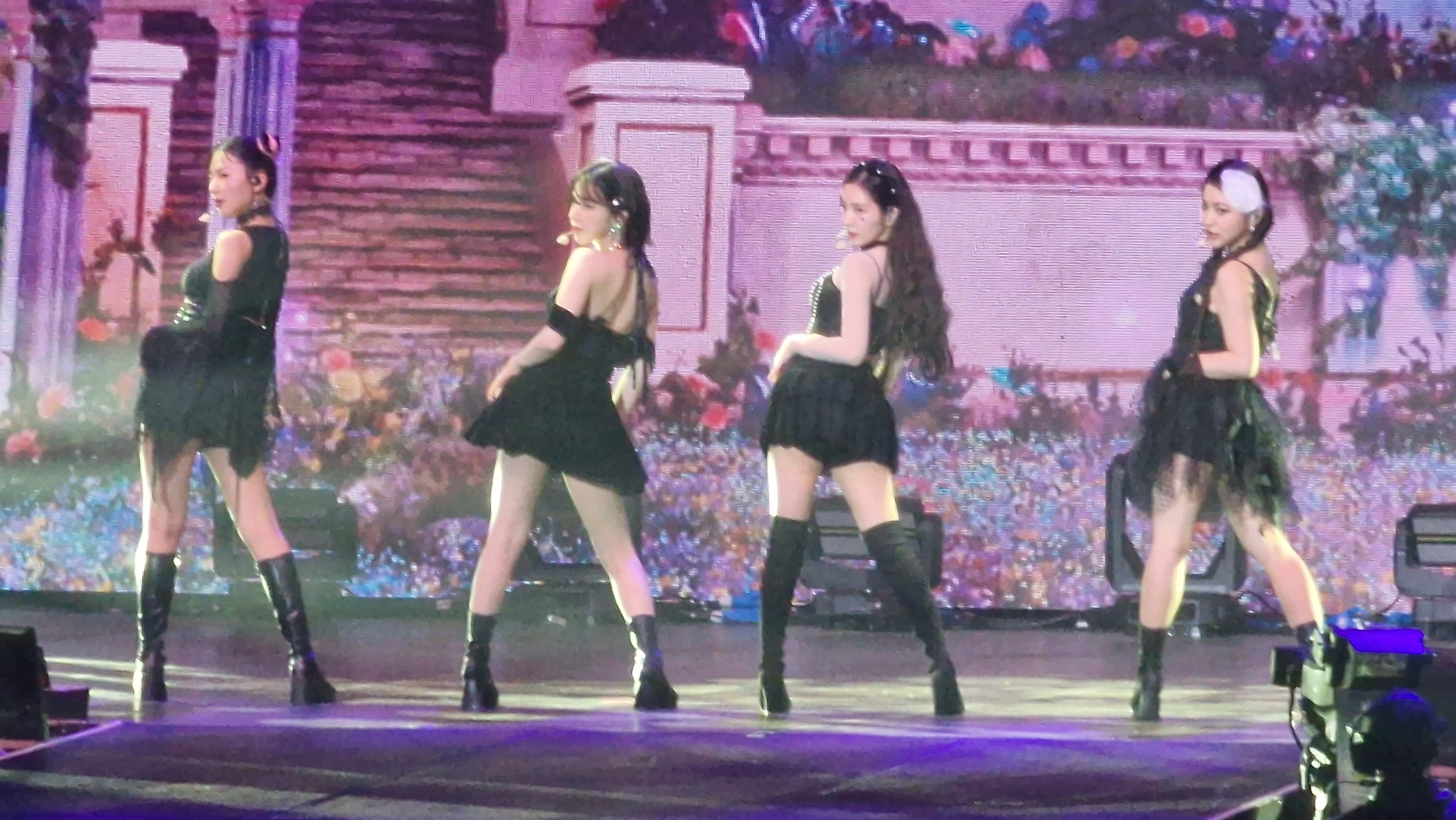

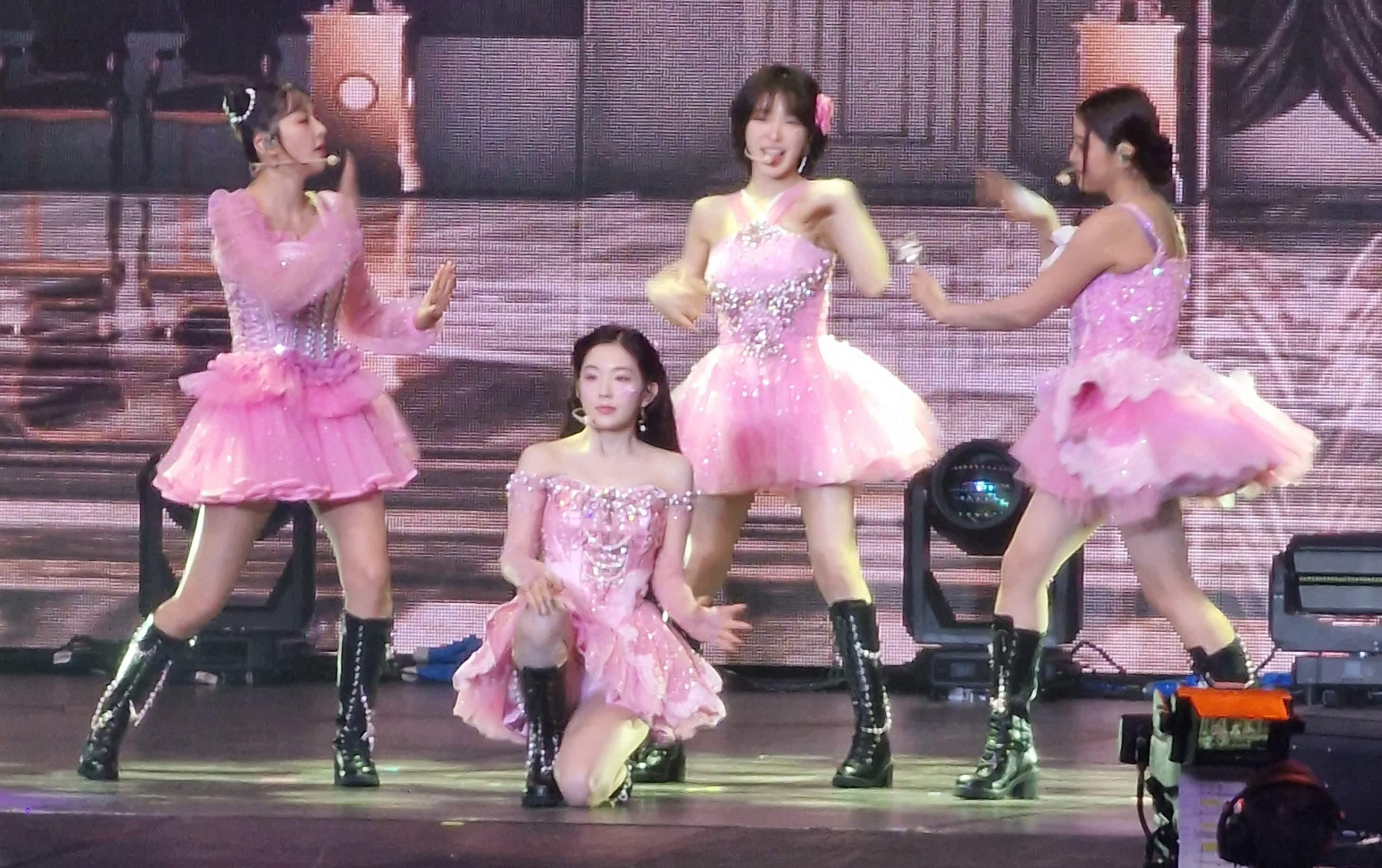

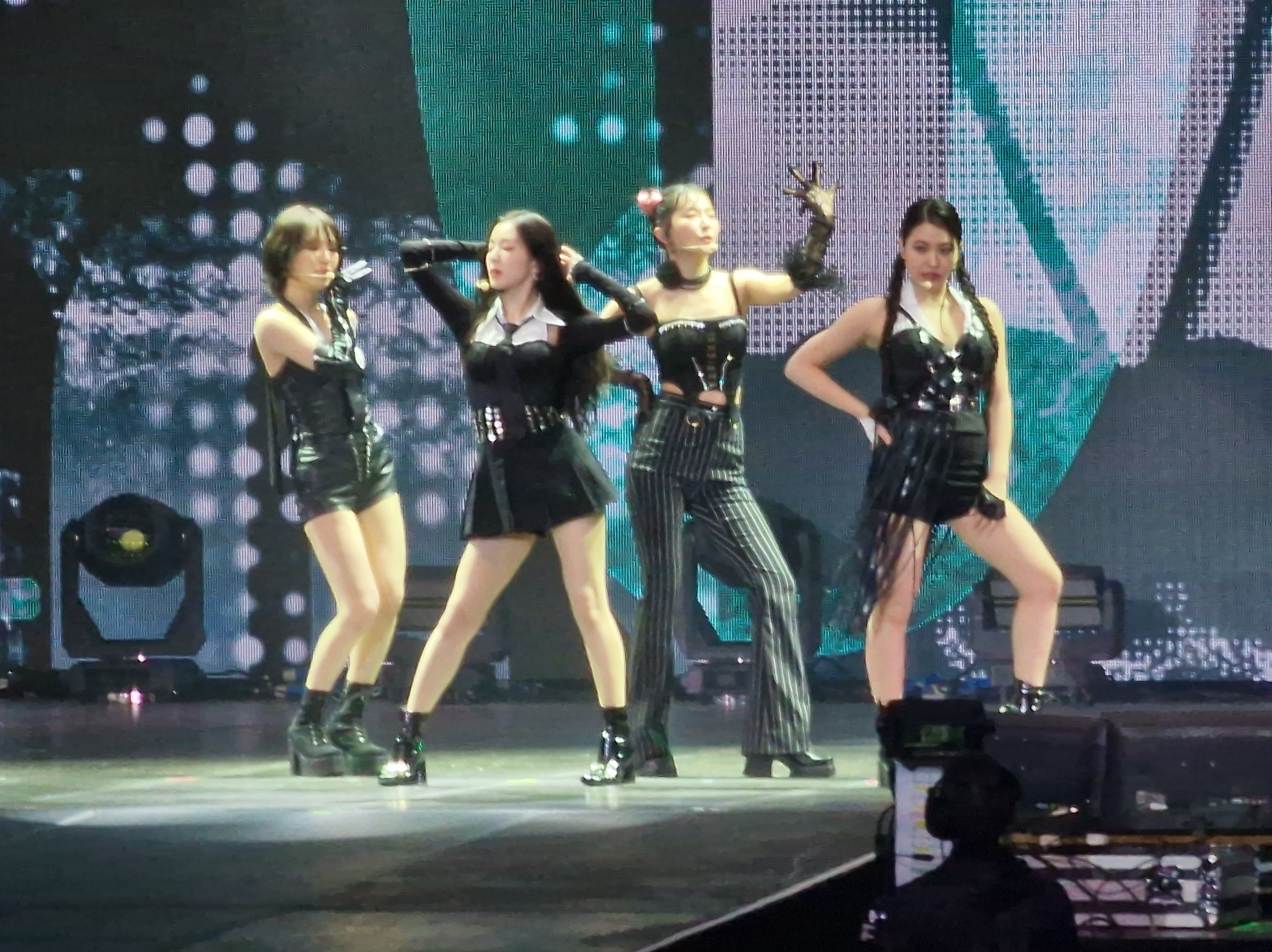

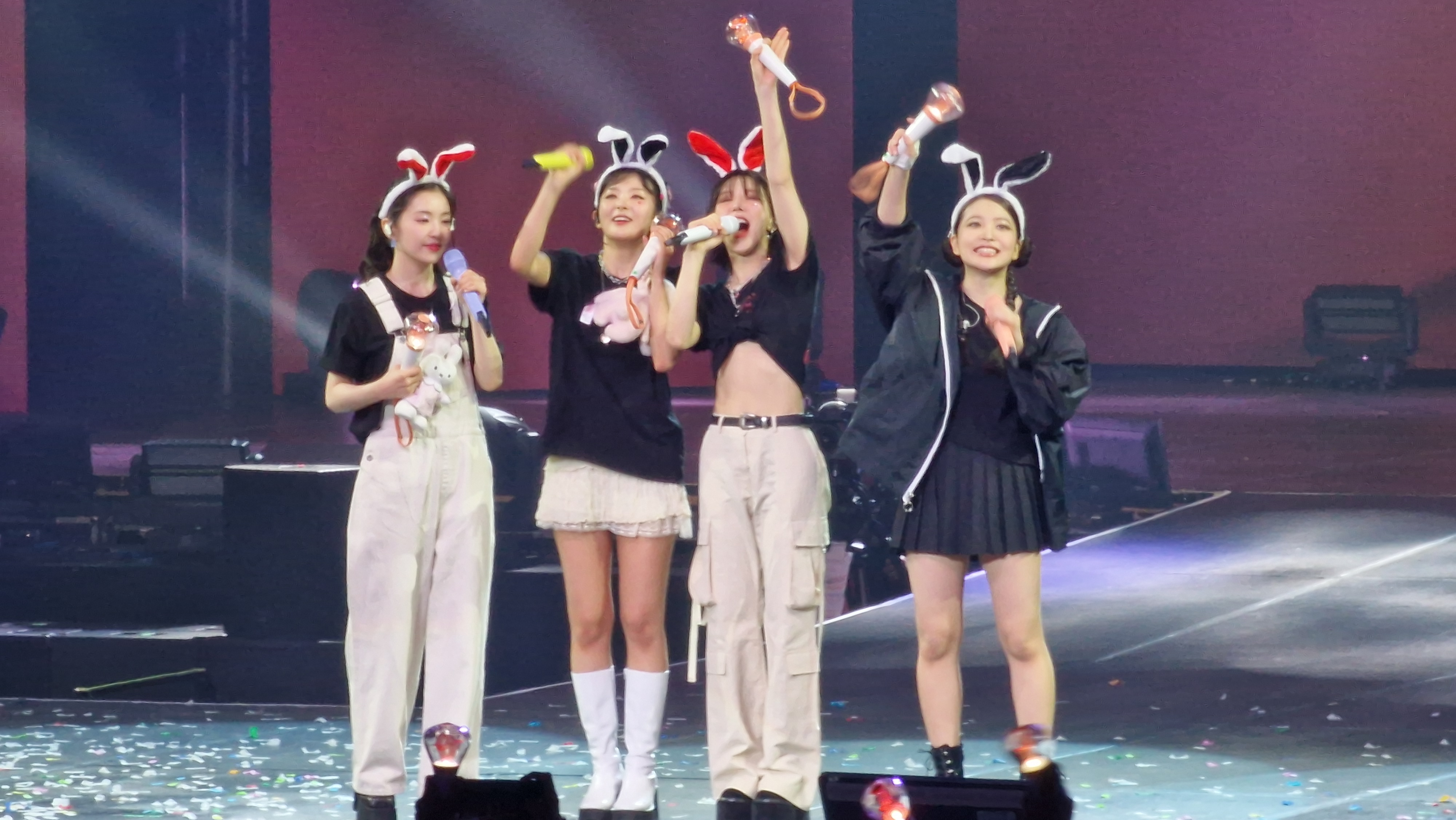
