= Chill Kill (song) =

Single by Red Velvet

from the album Chill Kill
- Language: Korean
- Released: November 13, 2023
- Genre: Dance-pop
- Length: 3:35
- Label: SM; Kakao
- Composers: Kenzie; Jonathan Gusmark; Ludvig Evers; Moa "Cazzi Opeia" Carlebecker; Ellen Berg
- Lyricist: Kenzie

Red Velvet singles chronology
"Beautiful Christmas" (2022)	"Chill Kill" (2023)	"Cosmic" (2024)

Music video
- "Chill Kill" on YouTube

"Chill Kill" is a song recorded by South Korean girl group Red Velvet for their third studio album of the same name. Written by Kenzie, who composed the song with Jonathan Gusmark, Ludvig Evers, Moa "Cazzi Opeia" Carlebecker, and Ellen Berg, it was released as the album's lead single by SM Entertainment on November 13, 2023.

== Background and release ==
On September 18, 2023, SM Entertainment announced Red Velvet would be releasing their third studio album in November 2023. On October 18, it was announced that their third studio album titled What a Chill Kill would be released on November 13. Five days later, the album was retitled as Chill Kill, and would contain ten tracks, including the lead single of the same name. On November 9, the highlight medley teaser video was released, followed by the music video teaser a day later. The song was released alongside its music video and the album on November 13.

== Composition ==
"Chill Kill" was primarily written, composed, and arranged by Kenzie with Jonathan Gusmark, Ludvig Evers, Moa "Cazzi Opeia" Carlebecker, and Ellen Berg participating in the composition, and Moonshine in the arrangement. Described as a pop dance track, the song is characterized by "heavy bass, string melodies, dreamy synths, and bell rhythm" with its lyrics "expressing the narrative of a love affair and longing for the other person even in the midst of tragedy when the quiet world was turned upside down".

== Critical reception ==
Year-end lists for "Chill Kill"
Critic/Publication	List	Rank	Ref.
Dazed	Top 50 best K-pop tracks of 2023	50	

== Accolades ==
Music program awards for "Chill Kill"
Program	Date	Ref.
Show! Music Core	November 25, 2023	

== Commercial performance ==
"Chill Kill" debuted at number 11 on South Korea's Circle Digital Chart in the chart issue dated November 12–18, 2023. In Singapore, the song debuted at number 23 on the RIAS Top Regional Chart in the chart issue dated November 10–16, 2023, and peaked at number 17 the next week.

== Promotion ==
Prior to the release of Chill Kill, on November 13, 2023, Red Velvet held a live event called "Red Velvet 'Chill Kill' Countdown Live" on YouTube, TikTok, Weverse, and Idol Plus, aimed at introducing the album and its tracks, including "Chill Kill", and connecting with their fanbase. The group subsequently performed on three music programs in the first week of promotion: KBS's Music Bank on November 17, MBC's Show! Music Core on November 18, and SBS's Inkigayo on November 19. In the second week of promotion, the group performed on two music programs: Music Bank on November 24, and Show! Music Core on November 25 where they won first place.

== Credits and personnel ==
Credits adapted from album's liner notes.

Studio

- SM LVYIN Studio – recording, digital editing
- SM Blue Ocean Studio – mixing
- 821 Sound – mastering

Personnel

- SM Entertainment – executive producer
- Red Velvet – vocals, background vocals
- Kenzie – lyrics, composition, arrangement, vocal directing
- Jonatan Gusmark (Moonshine) – composition, arrangement
- Ludvig Evers (Moonshine) – composition, arrangement
- Moa "Cazzi Opeia" Carlebecker – composition, background vocals
- Ellen Berg – composition, background vocals
- Lee Ji-hong – recording, digital editing
- Kim Cheol-sun – mixing
- Kwon Nam-woo – mastering

== Charts ==
=== Weekly charts ===
Weekly chart performance for "Chill Kill"
Chart (2023)	Peak position
Global Excl. U.S (Billboard)	193
Singapore Regional (RIAS)	17
South Korea (Circle)	11
Vietnam (Vietnam Hot 100)	54

=== Monthly charts ===
Monthly chart performance for "Chill Kill"
Chart (2023)	Position
South Korea (Circle)	28

=== Year-end charts ===
2023 year-end chart performance for "Chill Kill"
Chart (2023)	Position
South Korea Download (Circle)	138

== Release history ==
Release history for "Chill Kill"
Region	Date	Format	Label
Various	November 13, 2023	Digital download; streaming	SM; Kakao

== See also ==
- List of Show! Music Core Chart winners (2023)
