= Cosmic (song) =

Single by Red Velvet

from the EP Cosmic
- Language: Korean
- Released: June 24, 2024
- Genre: Dance-pop
- Length: 3:46
- Label: SM; Kakao
- Composers: Kenzie; Jonatan Gusmark; Ludvig Evers; Adrian McKinnon; Ellen Berg
- Lyricist: Kenzie

Red Velvet singles chronology
"Chill Kill" (2023)	"Cosmic" (2024)	"Sweet Dreams" (2024)

Music video
- "Cosmic" on YouTube

"Cosmic" is a song recorded by South Korean girl group Red Velvet for their seventh Korean extended play of the same name. Written by Kenzie, who composed the song alongside Jonatan Gusmark, Ludvig Evers, Adrian McKinnon, and Ellen Berg, it was released as the EP's lead single by SM Entertainment on June 24, 2024.

== Background and release ==
On June 10, 2024, SM Entertainment announced that Red Velvet would be releasing their seventh Korean extended play titled Cosmic. On June 13, it was announced that the lead single would be titled "Cosmic". On June 23, the music video teaser was released. The song was released alongside its music video and the extended play on June 24. The music video was inspired by the 2019 horror film Midsommar.

== Composition ==
"Cosmic" was written, composed, and arranged by Kenzie, with Jonatan Gusmark, Ludvig Evers, Adrian McKinnon, and Ellen Berg participating in the composition, and Moonshine participating in the arrangement. It was described as a dance-pop song characterized by "synth strings and disco rhythm" with "fairytale-like" lyrics "about meeting [the listener], a lonely traveler who crash-landed on [Red Velvet] and learning about infinite love like the universe". "Cosmic" was composed in the key of C-sharp major, with a tempo of 106 beats per minute.

== Commercial performance ==
"Cosmic" debuted at number 29 on South Korea's Circle Digital Chart in the chart issue dated June 23–29, 2024. In New Zealand, the song debuted at number 36 on the RMNZ Hot Singles in the chart issue dated July 1, 2024. In United Kingdom, the song debuted at number 90 on the OCC's UK Singles Download Chart, and number 93 on the OCC's UK Singles Sales Chart in the chart issue dated July 5–11, 2024.

== Promotion ==
Prior to the release of Cosmic, on June 24, 2024, Red Velvet held a live event called "Red Velvet 'Cosmic' Countdown Live" on YouTube, TikTok, and Weverse, aimed at introducing the extended play and its songs, including "Cosmic", and connecting with their fanbase. They subsequently performed on three music programs in the first week of promotion: Mnet's M Countdown on June 27, KBS's Music Bank on June 28, and SBS's Inkigayo on June 30. In the second week of promotion, they performed on three music programs: M Countdown on July 4, Music Bank on July 5, and Show! Music Core on July 6.

== Accolades ==
Awards and nominations
Award ceremony	Year	Category	Result	Ref.
MAMA Awards	2024	Best Vocal Performance – Group	Nominated	

=== Listicles ===
Name of publisher, year listed, name of listicle, and placement
Publisher	Year	Listicle	Placement	Ref.
Billboard	2024	The 25 Best K-Pop Songs of 2024 : Critic's Picks	7th	
Dazed	2024	The 50 best K-pop tracks of 2024	Included	
Idology	2024	16 Best Songs of 2024	Included	
NME	2024	The 25 best K-pop songs of 2024	5th	
Rolling Stone India	2024	10 Best K-pop Songs of 2024	Included	

== Credits and personnel ==
Credits adapted from the EP's liner notes.

Studio

- SM Aube Studio – recording
- SM Yellow Tail Studio – digital editing
- Doobdoob Studio – digital editing
- SM Blue Ocean Studio – mixing
- Sterling Sound – mastering

Personnel

- SM Entertainment – executive producer
- Park Jun-young – creative executive
- Red Velvet – vocals, background vocals
- Adrian McKinnon – background vocals, composition
- Ellen Berg – background vocals, composition
- Kenzie – lyrics, composition, arrangement, vocal directing
- Jonatan Gusmark (Moonshine) – composition, arrangement
- Ludvig Evers (Moonshine) – composition, arrangement
- Kim Hyo-joon – recording
- Noh Min-ji – digital editing
- Jang Woo-young – digital editing
- Kim Cheol-sun – mixing
- Chris Gehringer – mastering

== Charts ==
=== Weekly charts ===
Weekly chart performance
Chart (2024)	Peak position
China Korean (TME)	1
Global Excl. U.S (Billboard)	136
New Zealand Hot Singles (RMNZ)	36
Singapore Regional (RIAS)	28
South Korea (Circle)	29
UK Singles Downloads (Official Charts)	90
UK Singles Sales (OCC)	93

=== Monthly charts ===
Monthly chart performance
Chart (2024)	Position
South Korea (Circle)	41

=== Year-end charts ===
Year-end chart performance
Chart (2024)	Position
South Korea (Circle)	187

== Release history ==
Release history
Region	Date	Format	Label
Various	June 24, 2024	Digital download; streaming	SM; Kakao
