= Creative executive =

In film production, a creative executive (often called CE for short) is a studio executive tasked with reading scripts and finding source material which can be turned into motion picture content (feature films, television series, television films).

In advertising agencies, the term can also refer to the creative concept writer or copywriter.
