= Happiness (Red Velvet song) =

2014 single by Red Velvet

Single by Red Velvet
- Language: Korean
- Released: August 4, 2014
- Studio: SM Booming System (Seoul); SM Yellow Tail Studio (Seoul)
- Genre: Euro-pop
- Length: 3:41
- Label: SM; KT
- Composers: Will Simms; Chad Hugo; Anne Judith Wik; Chris Holsten
- Lyricist: Yoo Young-jin
- Producers: Will Simms; Chad Hugo

Red Velvet singles chronology
"Happiness" (2014)	"Be Natural" (2014)

Music video
- "Happiness" on YouTube

"Happiness" (Korean: 행복; RR: Haengbok) is the debut single recorded by South Korean girl group Red Velvet. The song was written by Yoo Young-jin, Will Simms, Chad Hugo, Anne Judith Wik, and Chris Holsten, with the production handled by Hugo and Simms. It was released digitally by SM Entertainment on August 4, 2014, in South Korea. The song also marked their first release under the Red Velvet moniker and their first as a quartet, introducing the four members Irene, Seulgi, Wendy, and Joy to the public.

An urban Euro-pop track, it is about how you can feel empowered and love yourself more by appreciating the small joys in life. Upon its release, "Happiness" received mixed reviews from music critics for its mish-mash of different sounds and styles and not much satisfaction with just this one song. The song charted moderately in South Korea, becoming the group's first top five entry on both the Gaon Digital Chart and Billboard's World Digital Songs chart. An accompanying music video was released on August 3, 2014, but a new version was reuploaded due to references to the Atomic bombings of Hiroshima and Nagasaki and the September 11 attacks. Red Velvet's debut stage for the song was a performance on Music Bank and further promotion was held on several South Korean music programs.

== Background and composition ==
Through SM Entertainment's trainee group SM Rookies, members Irene, Seulgi, and Wendy were introduced initially to the public. Rumors soon sparked out that the three members were to debut as a group in July 2014, which was then confirmed by SM Entertainment. A music video teaser for "Happiness" was then uploaded on July 28, 2014, being the group's first song, including the three aforementioned members and new member Joy, who would debut together as Red Velvet. The then-quarter girl group was SM Entertainment's new group since the introduction of Exo in 2012.

"Happiness"
"Happiness" is a vibrant urban Euro-pop song with fusion of "an intense synth sound" and elements from African music beat.

Musically, "Happiness" was described as a vibrant urban Euro-pop song that fuses "an intense synth sound" and elements from African tribal beat. Lee Ga-young of People Today described its "electronic sounds", which can be interpreted as SM Entertainment's intention to stick to experimental music styles. The song was produced by Will Simms and Chad Hugo, with the latter being known as one half of American production duo the Neptunes, and is composed in the key of B♭ minor with a tempo of 121 beats per minute. Lyrically, Simms and Hugo written the song's music with songwriter Anne Judith Wik (Dsign Music) and Chris Holsten, while Yoo Young-jin penned the Korean lyrics. The lyrics convey a message of how you can feel empowered and love yourself more by appreciating the small joys in life.

== Reception ==
Following its initial release, "Happiness" was met with mixed reviews from music critics. Jacques Petersen of Popdust called the track a "mish-mash of different sounds and styles that you wouldn't expect to work, but somehow does". On another song review, writers Kim Sung-Dae, Kim Sung-Hwan, Park Byung-Woon, and Park Sang-Joon of Y-Magazine described the track as featuring "four-dimensional messages mixed with Korean and English", further adding that "the individuality and charm of the vocals of the members have not yet been clearly revealed", while rating the track with three stars out of five. Writing for Hankook Ilbo, Lee Ho-yeon reported that "Happiness" was included on the songs that were on the music charts for the new year of 2020 due to positive energy from the title. In an individual song review, Yoo Je-sang of Idology magazine opined that "the frivolous melody and the lyrics that pour out without context are that of f(x)" since it was "relatively more organized and experienced than them", while writer Cho Sung-min of the same magazine viewed the track as a "little early to judge", further noticing how "there's not much satisfaction with just this one song".

The song was featured on Weiv magazine's "Weiv Writer's 2014 Singles of the Year". It received a nomination for Digital Bonsang at the 29th Golden Disk Awards, held in the year of 2015.

On the week of August 3, 2014, "Happiness" debuted and peaked at number five on South Korea's Gaon Digital Chart, marking Red Velvet's first top-five entry on the chart. In addition, the song debuted at number four on Billboard's World Digital Song Sales chart and has since sold 15,000 copies in the United States.

== Music video ==
=== Background ===
Directed by Kim Sung-wook, the music video for "Happiness" was released on August 3, 2014, one day before the digital release of the song on all South Korean digital streaming platforms. The video was initially released on August 1, 2014, but then experienced a re-release due to the controversial imagery concerning the Japan bombing. The beginning of the music video also featured a few then-SM trainees, including Yeri, who would join the group shortly after. The original music video for "Happiness" was replaced with an edited version, which became the second-most viewed K-pop music video worldwide for the month of August 2014.

The music video is set in a jungle-inspired background that uses motion graphic techniques to exude separation of the fantasy world from the reality.

=== Synopsis and reception ===
The music video is set in a jungle-inspired background with geometric patterns, combination of live action and animation, and various split screens. In addition, similarly to being led on a roller coaster at an amusement park, it has dynamic camera movements separating the fantasy world from reality, overcoming adult greed to gain happiness like in a fantasy world. Following the music video's release, Song Hyung-geun of E Today noted Red Velvet's "eye-catching charm", further praising the video for its "differentiated visual beauty using various imaging techniques such as motion graphics and collage". Kim Sun-min of News Way noted Red Velvet's "glamorous outfits and striking hairstyles" in the music video. On December 3, 2020, the music video for the track reached 100 million views on YouTube, with them becoming the first SM Entertainment group to have over a hundred million views debut music video, while it was the ninth music video of Red Velvet to reach this mark.

=== Controversy ===
In August 2014, after the release of the music video for "Happiness", Japanese media reported that images referencing the Atomic bombings of Hiroshima and Nagasaki, as well as the September 11 attacks, were seen in the background of the video. SM Entertainment responded to the reports, stating: "When I inquired with the music video director, it was said that there was no intention because it was simply using the image source of the collage technique." The representative added that the label removed the content and will take care to prevent the situation from happening in the future. SM later uploaded a new version of the music video without the controversial images.

== Live performances ==
Red Velvet started the promotion for "Happiness" first with a performance on Music Bank, making it their debut stage. For the performance, choreography by Japanese-born choreographer Ayako Takeuchi was commissioned, with participation from SM performance director Shim Jae-won. Following the release of the song, Red Velvet performed "Happiness" on several South Korean music programs. On September 15, 2014, Red Velvet performed the song for SM Town Live World Tour IV at the Seoul World Cup Stadium in Seoul, South Korea.

== Credits and personnel ==
Credits adapted from the liner notes of "Happiness".

Studio

- SM Booming System – recording, additional vocal editing
- SM Yellow Tail Studio – recording, mixing
- SM Big Shot Studio – recording assistant
- Doobdoob Studio – additional vocal editing
- JFS Mastering – mastering

Personnel

- SM Entertainment – executive producer
- Lee Soo-man – producer
- Kim Young-min – executive supervisor
- Red Velvet (Irene, Seulgi, Wendy, Joy) – vocals, background vocals
- Yoo Young-jin – lyrics, vocal directing, recording, additional vocal editing
- Will Simms – producer, composition, arrangement
- Chad Hugo – producer, composition, arrangement
- Anne Judith Wik – composition, arrangement, background vocals
- Chris Holsten – composition, arrangement
- Maxx Song – vocal directing, Pro Tools operating, additional vocal editing
- Koo Jong-pil – recording, mixing
- Lee Min-kyu – recording assistant
- Lee Ji-hong – additional vocal editing
- Seong Ji-hoon – mastering

== Charts ==
=== Weekly charts ===
Weekly chart performance for "Happiness"
Chart (2014)	Peak position
South Korea (Gaon)	5
US World Digital Song Sales (Billboard)	4

=== Monthly charts ===
August 2014 monthly chart performance for "Happiness"
Chart (August 2014)	Position
South Korea (Gaon)	14

== Release history ==
Release dates and formats for "Happiness"
Region	Date	Format(s)	Label(s)	Ref.
Various	August 1, 2014	Promotional CD	SM Entertainment; KT Music	
Various	August 4, 2014	Digital download; streaming	SM Entertainment; KT Music	
