= List of Music Bank Chart winners (2015) =

Music Bank Chart winners (2015)

Highlights
- Songs with most wins: "Call Me Baby" by Exo & "Lion Heart" by Girls' Generation (4)
- Artist(s) with most wins: Exo (9)
- Song with highest score: "Call Me Baby" by Exo (12,681)

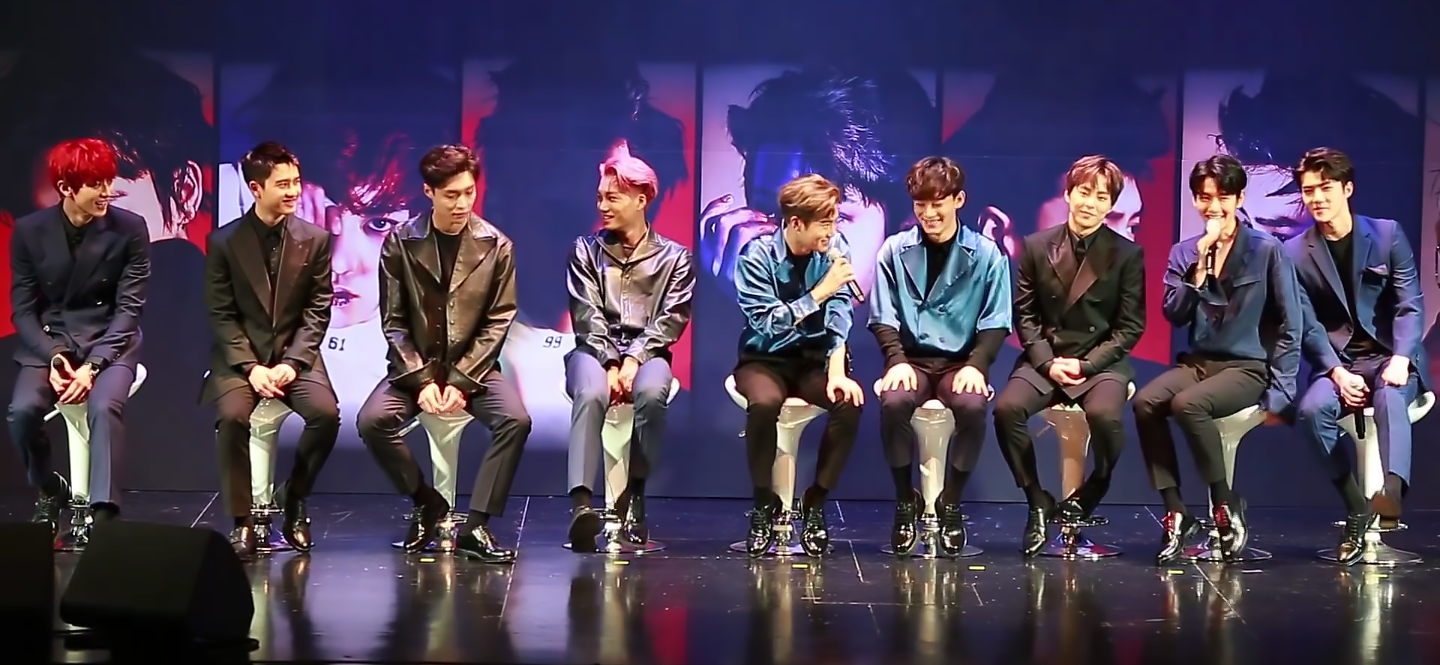
"Call Me Baby" by Exo (pictured) had the highest score of 2015, with 12,681 points on the April 10th broadcast.

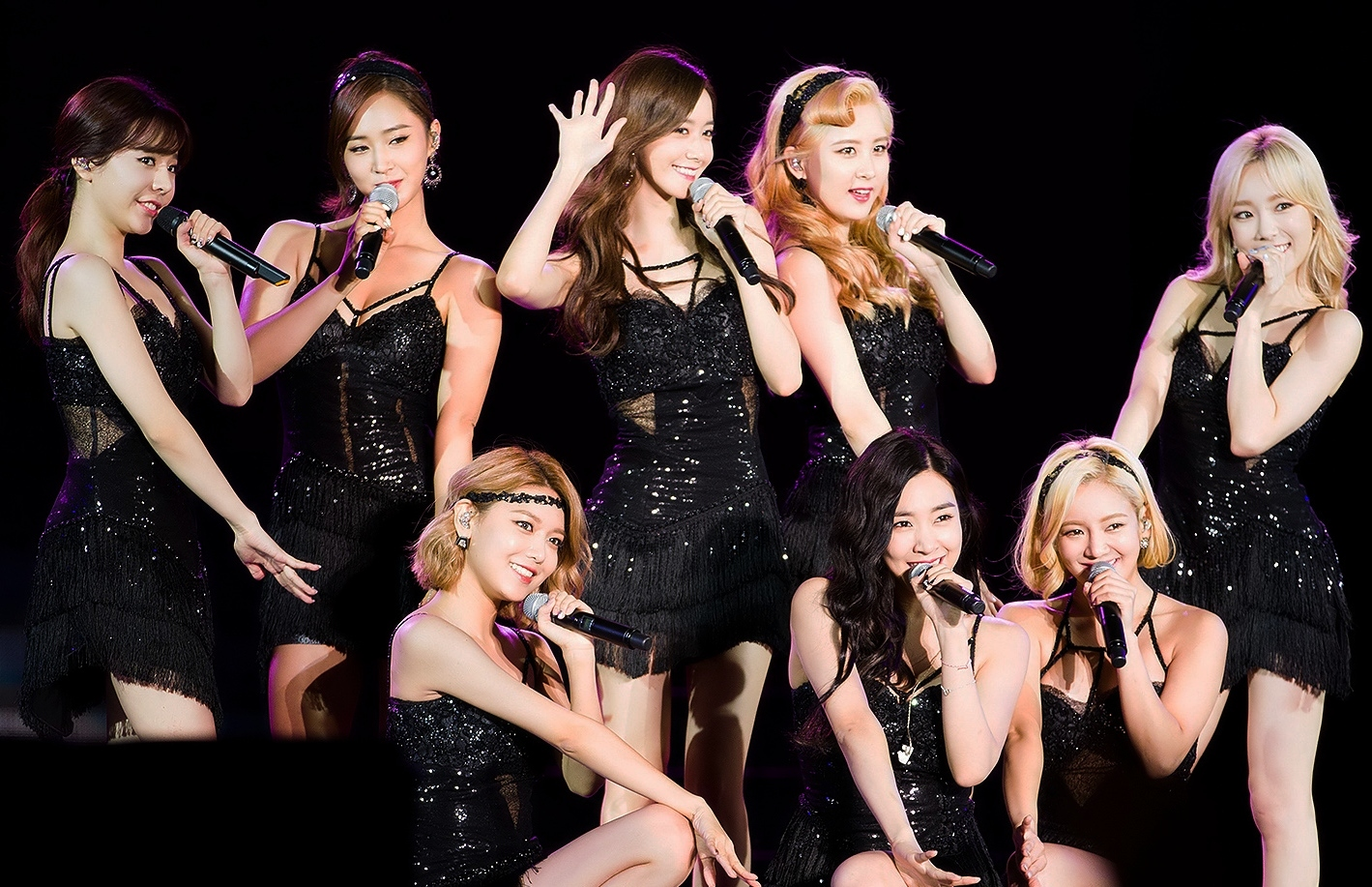
Girls' Generation's win on the July 17 broadcast with "Party" marked their 100th music show win, becoming the first artist to do so in South Korean music show history.

The Music Bank Chart is a record chart established in 1998 on the South Korean KBS television music program Music Bank. Every week during its live broadcast, the show gives an award for the best-performing single on the South Korean chart. The chart includes digital performance on domestic online music services (65%), album sales (5%), number of times the single was broadcast on KBS TV (20%), and viewers' choice (10%) in its ranking methodology. The score for domestic online music services is calculated using data from Melon, Bugs, Genie Music, and Soribada. Actor Park Seo-joon and Sistar member Yoon Bo-ra had hosted the show since October 2013 and continued to do so until April 24, 2015. Starting May 1, actor and singer Park Bo-gum and Red Velvet member Irene became the hosts of the show. BTS member V and B.A.P member Kim Him-chan appeared as special hosts along with Park Bo-gum on the December 4 broadcast in lieu of Irene.

In 2015, 35 singles reached number one on the chart, and 27 acts were awarded first-place trophies. Of all releases for the year, Exo's "Call Me Baby" acquired the highest point total on the April 10 broadcast with a score of 12,681, and along with "Lion Heart" by Girls' Generation, are ranked number one on the chart for four consecutive weeks, making both singles the most awarded songs of the year. The first winner of the year was "December, 2014 (The Winter's Tale)" by Exo which debuted at number one on the January 2 broadcast. The group had four number one singles on the chart in 2015: "December, 2014 (The Winter's Tale)", "Call Me Baby", "Love Me Right" and "Sing for You", the most of any act in 2015. The four songs spent a total of nine weeks atop the chart, making Exo the act with the most wins of the year. Girl group Girls' Generation won their 100th music show win on the July 17 broadcast with their win for "Party" becoming the first artist to do so in South Korean music show history. Member Taeyeon won her first Music Bank trophy for her debut single "I" featuring rapper Verbal Jint. The single spent three weeks at number one on the chart, the most of any solo artist in 2015.

Super Junior's sub-unit Super Junior-D&E consisting of members Donghae and Eunhyuk won their first ever music show trophy on Music Bank with their single "Growing Pains". Girl group Red Velvet achieved their first music show win on Music Bank with "Ice Cream Cake" from their debut extended play of the same name. Boy group BTS won their first Music Bank trophy three years after their debut with "I Need U" on the May 8 broadcast. EXID won their first Music Bank award for "Up & Down" over four months after its release after a fan-recorded video of member Hani performing the song went viral on South Korean social networking websites. CNBLUE's Jung Yong-hwa and Teen Top's Niel received their first ever solo music show trophies on Music Bank with "One Fine Day" and "Bad Girl" respectively.

== Chart history ==
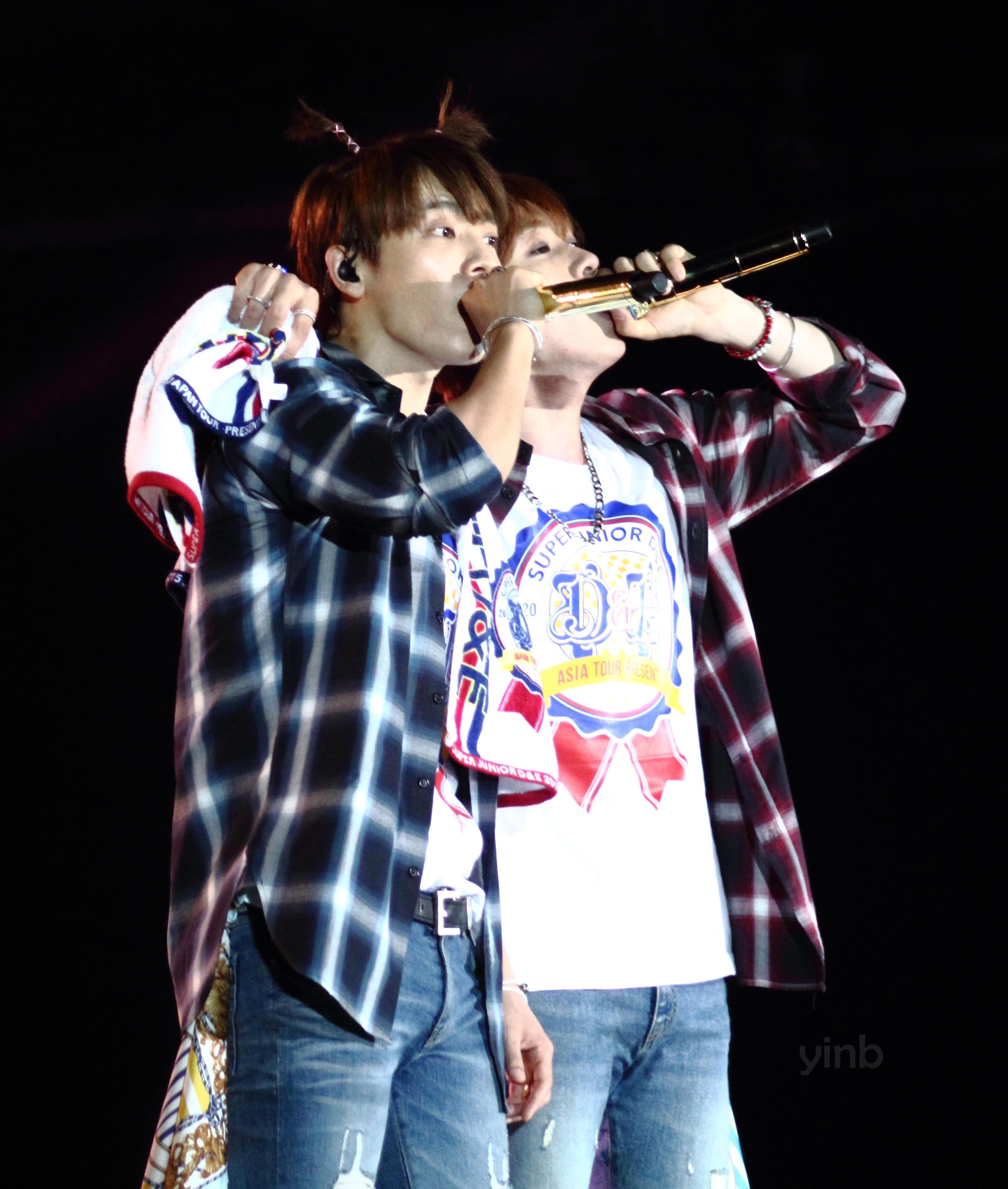
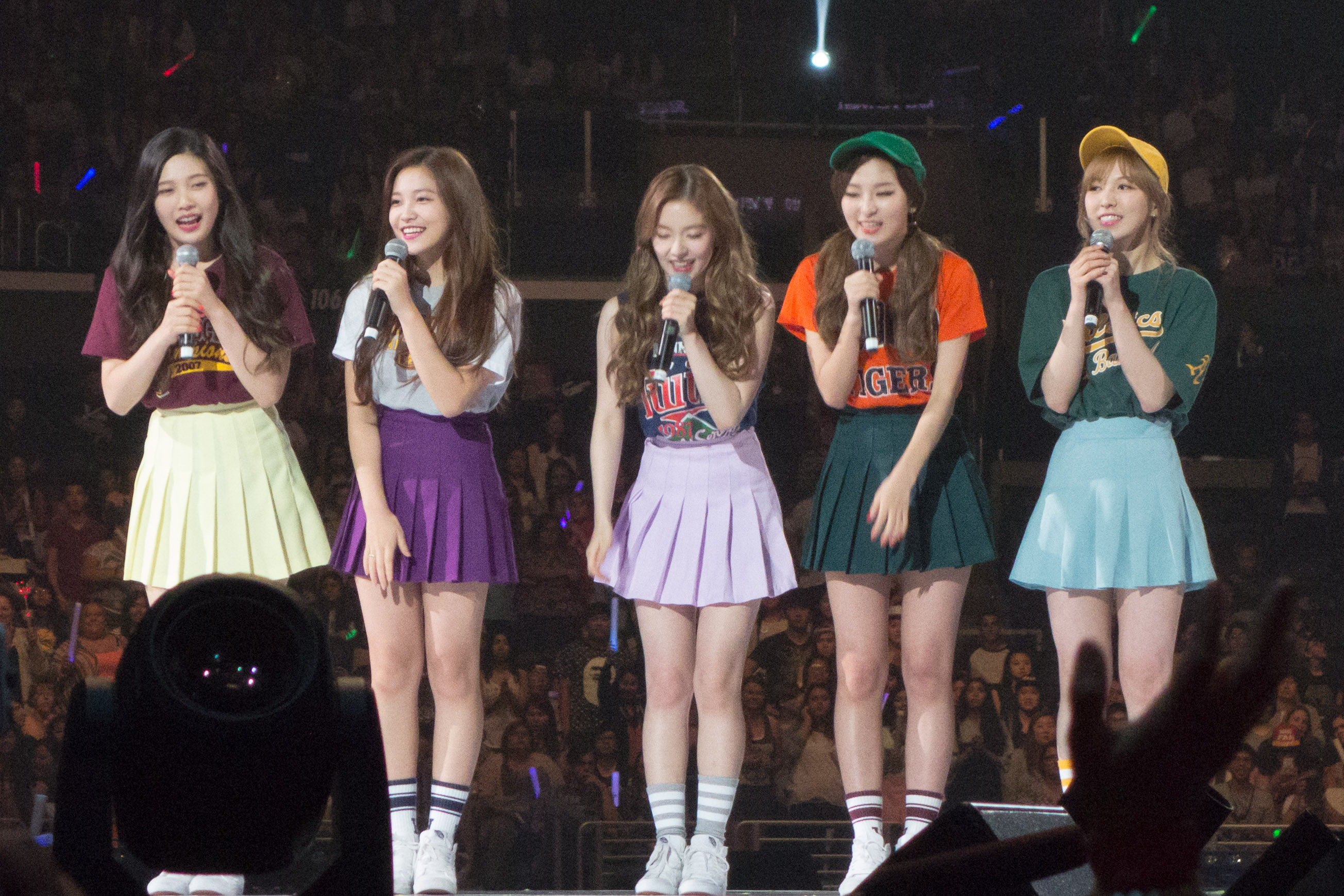
Super Junior-D&E (left) and Red Velvet (right) won their first ever music show trophies with "Growing Pains" and "Ice Cream Cake", respectively.
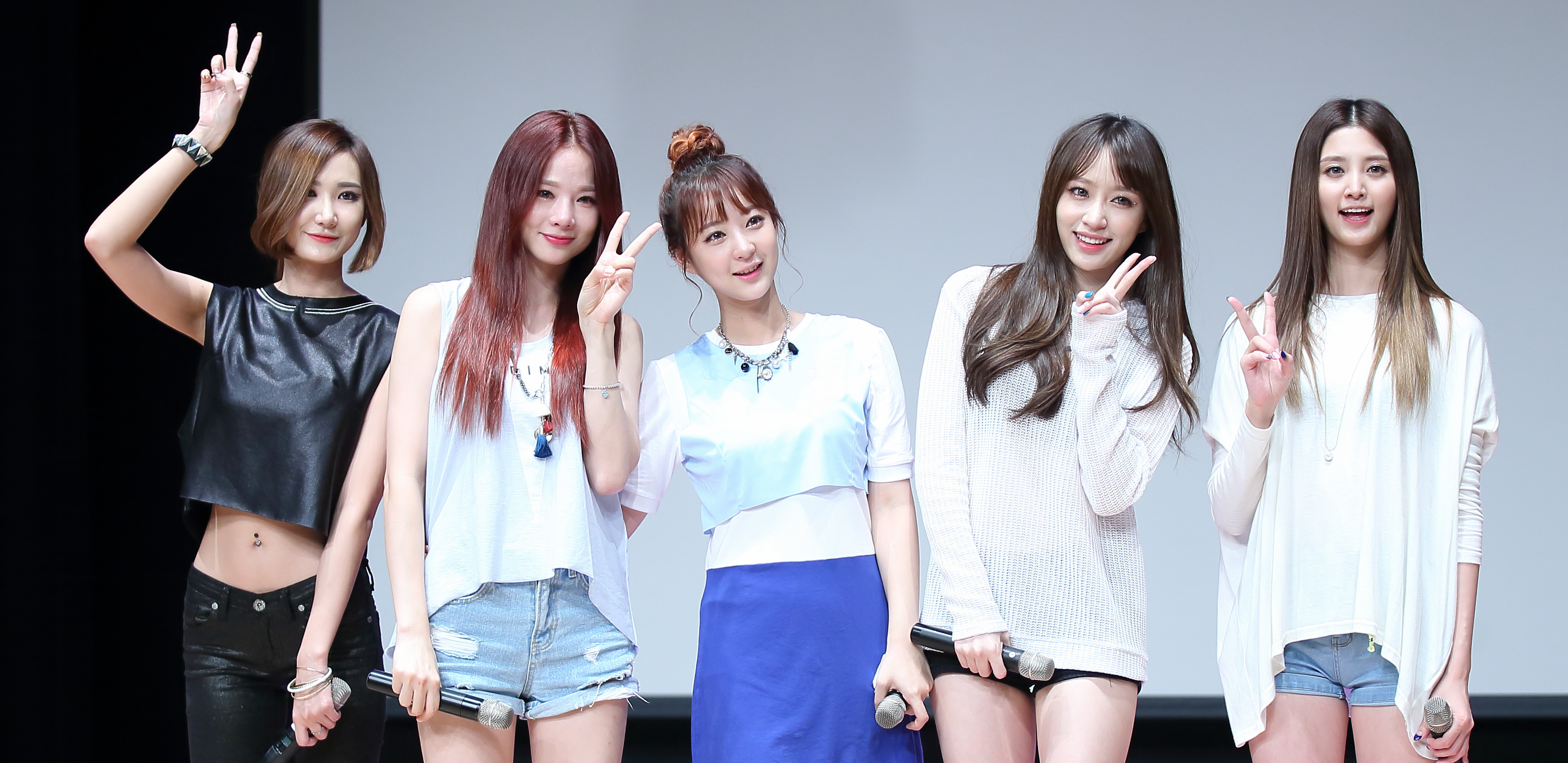
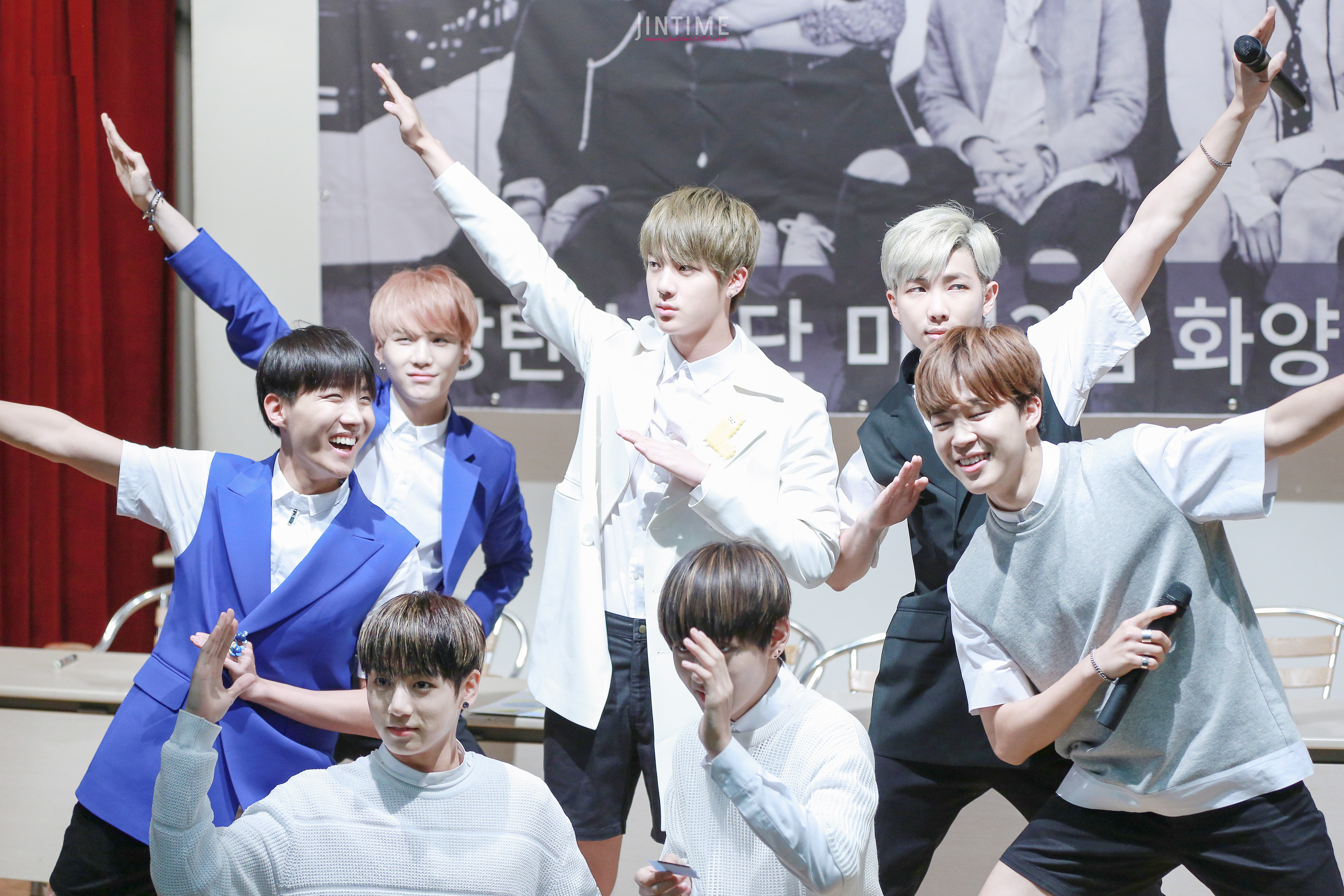
EXID (top) and BTS (bottom) received their first ever major broadcast music show wins with their Music Bank trophies for "Up & Down" and "I Need U", respectively.

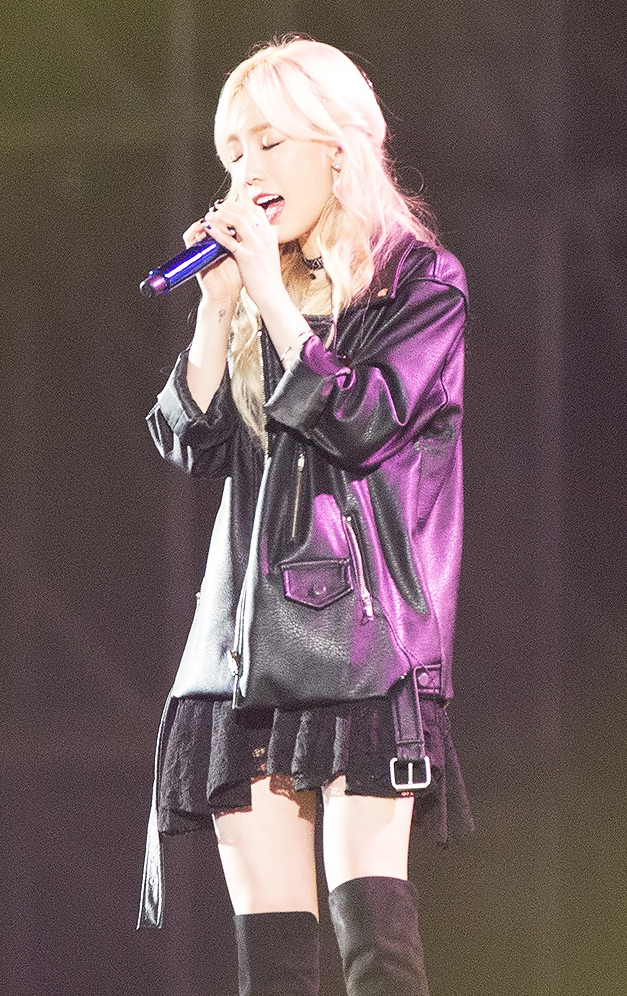
Taeyeon of Girls' Generation won her first Music Bank trophy as a soloist with "I".

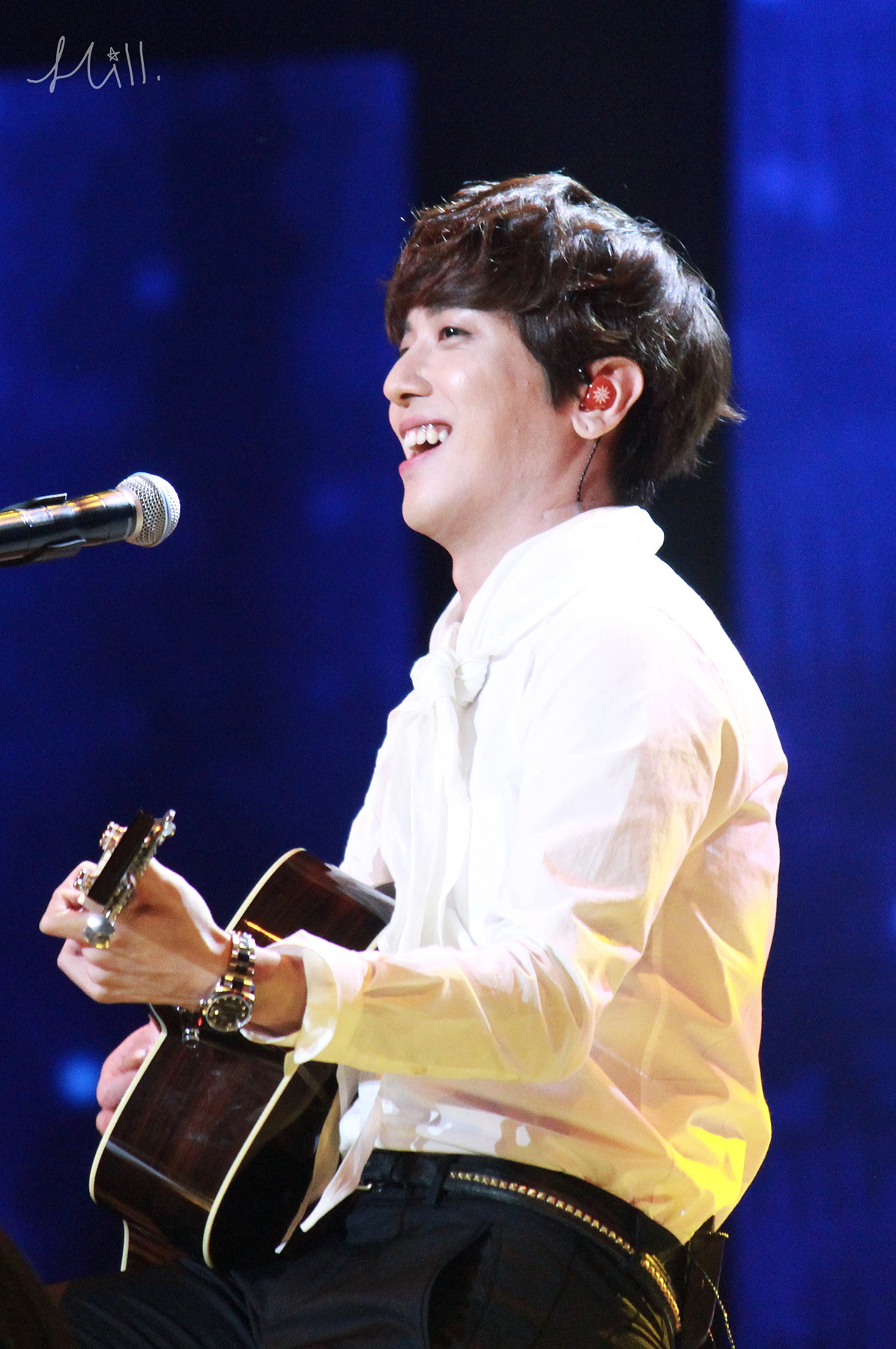
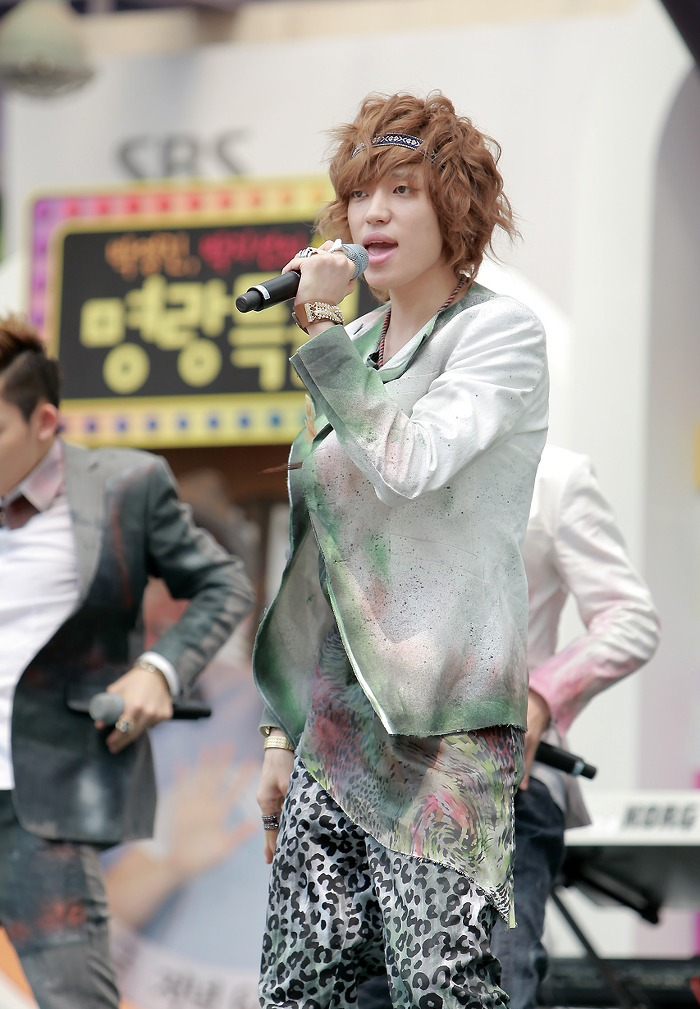
CNBLUE's Jung Yong-hwa (left) and Teen Top's Niel (right) received their first ever solo music show trophies with "One Fine Day" and "Bad Girl" respectively.

Key
‡	Highest score in 2015
—	No show was broadcast

Chart history
Episode	Date	Artist	Song	Points	Ref.
768	January 2	Exo	"December, 2014 (The Winter's Tale)"	4,924	
769	January 9	EXID	"Up & Down"	5,054	
770	January 16	EXID	"Up & Down"	4,224	
771	January 23	Jonghyun	"Déjà-Boo"	8,835	
772	January 30	Jung Yong-hwa	"One Fine Day"	7,810	
773	February 6	Davichi	"Cry Again"	5,748	
774	February 13	Jung Yong-hwa	"One Fine Day"	5,799	
— (Note: This week's winners were announced on the station's official website.)	February 20	Naul	"You From The Same Time"	6,541	
775	February 27	Niel	"Lovekiller (Bad Girl)"	6,226	
776	March 6	VIXX	"Love Equation"	8,963	
777	March 13	Shinhwa	"Sniper (Target)"	7,614	
778	March 20	Super Junior-D&E	"Growing Pains"	6,442	
779	March 27	Red Velvet	"Ice Cream Cake"	5,156	
780	April 3	F.T. Island	"Pray"	4,454	
781	April 10	Exo	"Call Me Baby"	12,681 ‡	
782	April 17	Exo	"Call Me Baby"	10,525	
783	April 24	Exo	"Call Me Baby"	8,182	
784	May 1	Exo	"Call Me Baby"	7,746	
785	May 8	BTS	"I Need U"	5,973	
786	May 15	Big Bang	"Loser"	8,999	
787	May 22	Big Bang	"Loser"	6,277	
788	May 29	Shinee	"View"	7,297	
789	June 5	Shinee	"View"	8,272	
790	June 12	Exo	"Love Me Right"	10,595	
791	June 19	Exo	"Love Me Right"	8,084	
792	June 26	Baek A-yeon	"Shouldn't Have"	5,907	
793	July 3	Sistar	"Shake It"	8,180	
794	July 10	Sistar	"Shake It"	7,762	
795	July 17	Girls' Generation	"Party"	7,380	
796	July 24	Infinite	"Bad"	6,770	
797	July 31	Apink	"Remember"	6,645	
798	August 7	Beast	"YeY"	9,299	
799	August 14	Shinee	"Married to the Music"	6,636	
800	August 21	Big Bang	"Let's Not Fall in Love"	6,755	
801	August 28	Girls' Generation	"Lion Heart"	5,612	
802	September 4	Girls' Generation	"Lion Heart"	9,280	
803	September 11	Girls' Generation	"Lion Heart"	8,235	
804	September 18	Girls' Generation	"Lion Heart"	6,382	
—	September 25	CNBLUE	"Cinderella"	6,267	
805	October 2	CNBLUE	"Cinderella"	5,793	
806	October 9	Im Chang-jung	"Love Again"	8,113	
807	October 16	Taeyeon	"I"	8,708	
808	October 23	Taeyeon	"I"	8,382	
809	October 30	Taeyeon	"I"	6,007	
810	November 6	f(x)	"4 Walls"	7,105	
811	November 13	f(x)	"4 Walls"	5,836	
812	November 20	VIXX	"Chained Up"	6,659	
813	November 27	B.A.P	"Young, Wild & Free"	5,574	
814	December 4	Lee Hong-gi	"Insensible"	3,919	
815	December 11	BTS	"Run"	7,799	
816	December 18	Exo	"Sing for You"	8,372	
817	December 25	Exo	"Sing for You"	7,607	

== See also ==
- List of Inkigayo Chart winners (2015)
- List of M Countdown Chart winners (2015)
- List of Show! Music Core Chart winners (2015)
