= List of Inkigayo Chart winners (2015) =

Inkigayo Chart winners (2015)

Highlights
- Artist(s) with most wins: BigBang (8)
- Song with highest score: "Let's Not Fall in Love" by BigBang (11,000)

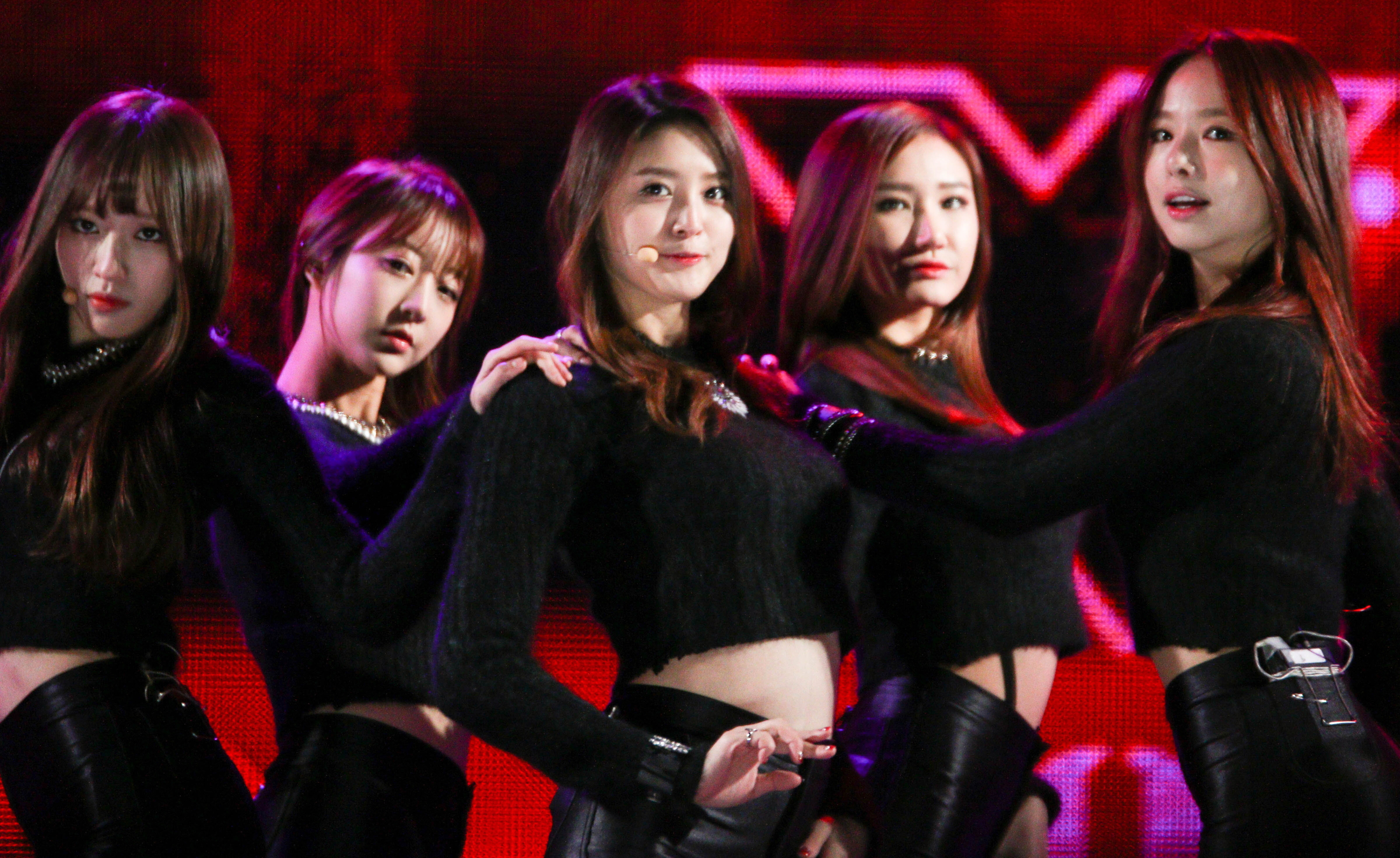
The sudden rise in popularity of EXID's "Up & Down" contributed to the group's first Inkigayo award.

The Inkigayo Chart is a music program record chart that gives an award to the best-performing single of the week in South Korea. Up until February 1, 2015, the chart measured digital performance in domestic online music services (6,000 points), social media via YouTube views (3,500 points), and advanced viewer votes (500 points) in its ranking methodology. The candidates for the number-one song of the week received additional points from live votes (1,000 points). Beginning on February 8, Inkigayo implemented modifications for its measurements of digital performance (down to 5,500 points) and added album sales (500 points). Songs that spend three weeks at number one are awarded a Triple Crown and are removed from the chart and ineligible to win again. The show was hosted by five different people across the whole year. Hwang Kwang-hee, Kim Yoo-jung and Hong Jong-hyun had hosted the show together since December 28, 2014. Kwang-hee was replaced by Jackson Wang starting with the April 12 broadcast while Jong-hyun left the show on August 30. On September 13, Yook Sung-jae joined the show as a host alongside Yoo-jung and Wang.

In 2015, there were 34 singles that ranked number one on the chart and 23 music acts received award trophies for this feat. Boy group BigBang had four number one singles on the chart, the most of any act in 2015: "Loser", "Bang Bang Bang", "Sober" and "Let's Not Fall in Love". The latter achieved a perfect score of 11,000 points on the August 23 broadcast, making it the single with the highest points of the year. The four songs spent a total of eight weeks atop the chart, helping BigBang become the act with the most wins of the year. Their single "Loser" spent three weeks on the chart and achieved a triple crown. Their sub-unit GD X Taeyang's "Good Boy" was the first winner of the year. Exo achieved the first triple crown of the year in April with their single "Call Me Baby". They would go on to rank number one again with "Love Me Right" in June. Girl group Girls' Generation also achieved a triple crown with "Lion Heart". Prior to that their single "Party" ranked number one for two consecutive weeks in July. The single helped the group achieve their 100th music show award on another TV show, Music Bank, becoming the first artists to do so in South Korean music show history. Member Taeyeon ranked number one for the first time on the chart with her debut single "I" which went on to achieve a triple crown. The last triple crown of the year was achieved by Psy with his single "Daddy".

Besides Taeyeon, five other solo artists achieved their first number one on Inkigayo in 2015. Rapper Mad Clown received his first win on the program with "Fire". Other first-time Inkigayo winners as soloists include Jonghyun's "Déjà-Boo", Jung Yong-hwa's "One Fine Day", Naul's "You from the Same Time", and Zico's "Boys and Girls". Girl group EXID won its first Inkigayo award with "Up & Down" over four months after its release after a fan-recorded video of member Hani performing the song went viral on South Korean social networking websites. EXID topped the chart with two other singles in 2015: "Ah Yeah" and "Hot Pink". Girl group Red Velvet achieved their first award on Inkigayo with "Ice Cream Cake" from their debut extended play of the same name. Their single "Dumb Dumb" went go on to debut at number one on the chart on September 20 broadcast. Boy group iKon achieved their first number one on the chart with "My Type" in September and went on to achieve another number one in November with "Apology".

== Chart history ==
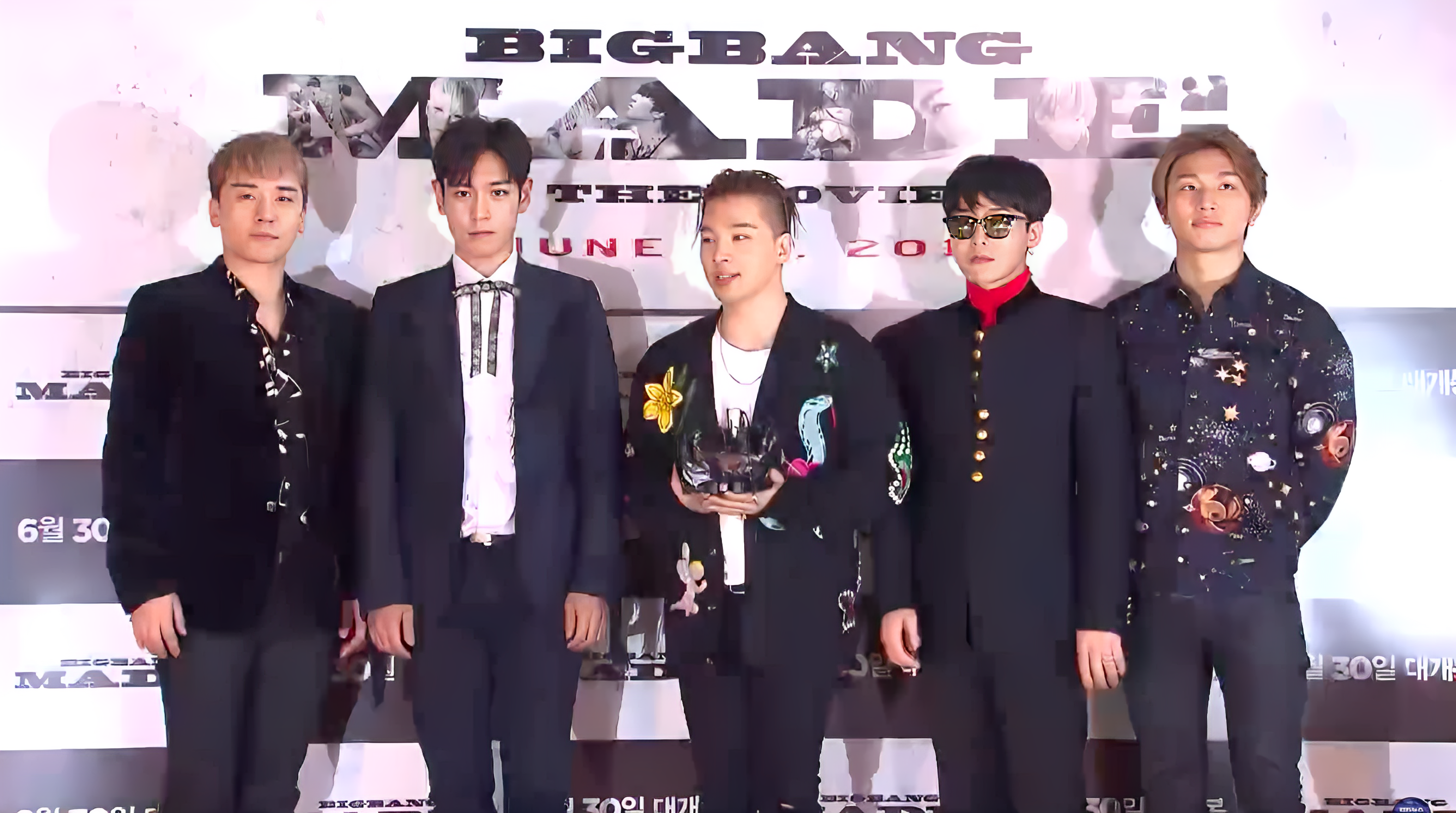
"Let's Not Fall in Love" accumulated 11,000 points on the August 23 broadcast, earning boy group BigBang the highest score of 2015.

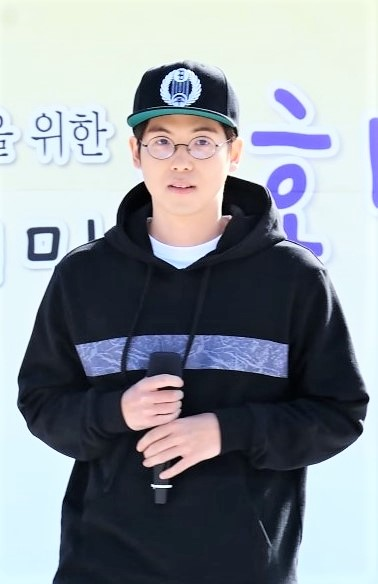
Rapper Mad Clown won his first Inkigayo award with "Fire".

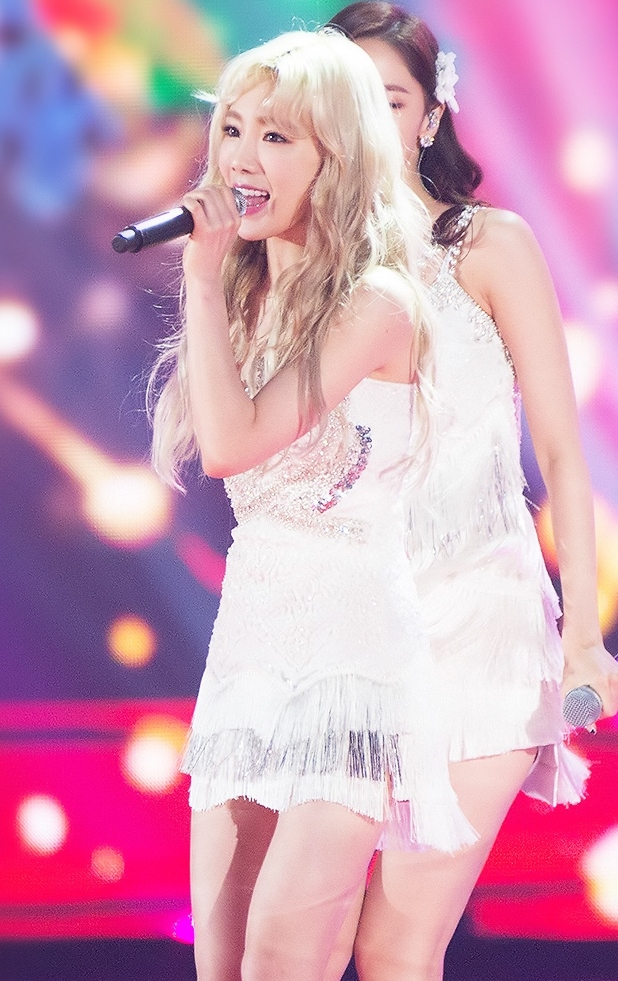
Taeyeon of Girls' Generation collected her first Inkigayo award and Triple Crown as a soloist with "I".

Key
| † | Indicates the song achieved a Triple Crown |
| ‡ | Indicates the highest score of the year |
| — | No show was held |

Chart history
| Episode | Date | Artist | Song | Points | Ref. |
|---|---|---|---|---|---|
| 797 | January 4 | GD X Taeyang | "Good Boy" | 8,136 | |
| 798 | January 11 | EXID | "Up & Down" | 8,346 | |
| 799 | January 18 | Jonghyun | "Déjà-Boo" | 8,218 | |
| 800 | January 25 | Mad Clown | "Fire" | 9,286 | |
| 801 | February 1 | Jung Yong-hwa | "One Fine Day" | 8,106 | |
| 802 | February 8 | Infinite H | "Pretty" | 9,408 | |
| 803 | February 15 | Naul | "You from the Same Time" | 8,525 | |
| — | February 22 | 4Minute | "Crazy" | 7,526 | |
| 804 | March 1 | 4Minute | "Crazy" | 7,975 | |
| 805 | March 8 | VIXX | "Love Equation" | 9,632 | |
| 806 | March 15 | Shinhwa | "Sniper" | 7,708 | |
| 807 | March 22 | Shinhwa | "Sniper" | 7,902 | |
| 808 | March 29 | Red Velvet | "Ice Cream Cake" | 8,504 | |
| 809 | April 5 | Exo | "Call Me Baby" † | 10,000 | |
| 810 | April 12 | Exo | "Call Me Baby" † | 9,717 | |
| 811 | April 19 | Exo | "Call Me Baby" † | 10,051 | |
| 812 | April 26 | EXID | "Ah Yeah" | 9,387 | |
| 813 | May 3 | EXID | "Ah Yeah" | 9,333 | |
| 814 | May 10 | BigBang | "Loser" † | 10,909 | |
| 815 | May 17 | BigBang | "Loser" † | 10,594 | |
| 816 | May 24 | BigBang | "Loser" † | 10,127 | |
| 817 | May 31 | Shinee | "View" | 9,741 | |
| 818 | June 7 | Shinee | "View" | 10,850 | |
| 819 | June 14 | BigBang | "Bang Bang Bang" | 9,029 | |
| 820 | June 21 | Exo | "Love Me Right" | 9,308 | |
| 821 | June 28 | BigBang | "Bang Bang Bang" | 9,981 | |
| 822 | July 5 | Sistar | "Shake It" | 9,583 | |
| 823 | July 12 | BigBang | "Sober" | 9,189 | |
| 824 | July 19 | Girls' Generation | "Party" | 10,229 | |
| 825 | July 26 | Girls' Generation | "Party" | 8,481 | |
| 826 | August 2 | Beast | "Gotta Go to Work" | 7,470 | |
| 827 | August 9 | Beast | "YeY" | 7,154 | |
| 828 | August 16 | BigBang | "Let's Not Fall in Love" | 9,000 | |
| 829 | August 23 | BigBang | "Let's Not Fall in Love" | 11,000 ‡ | |
| 830 | August 30 | Girls' Generation | "Lion Heart" † | 9,561 | |
| 831 | September 6 | Girls' Generation | "Lion Heart" † | 10,520 | |
| 832 | September 13 | Girls' Generation | "Lion Heart" † | 10,372 | |
| 833 | September 20 | Red Velvet | "Dumb Dumb" | 10,651 | |
| 834 | September 27 | iKon | "My Type" | 9,273 | |
| 835 | October 4 | iKon | "My Type" | 9,160 | |
| — | October 11 | Im Chang-jung | "Love Again" | 6,437 | |
| 836 | October 18 | Taeyeon | "I" † | 10,140 | |
| 837 | October 25 | Taeyeon | "I" † | 8,454 | |
| 838 | November 1 | IU | "Twenty-Three" | 8,208 | |
| 839 | November 8 | IU | "Twenty-Three" | 9,514 | |
| 840 | November 15 | Zico | "Boys and Girls" | 7,777 | |
| — | November 22 | Taeyeon | "I" † | 6,627 | |
| 841 | November 29 | iKon | "Apology" | 8,301 | |
| 842 | December 6 | EXID | "Hot Pink" | 8,331 | |
| 843 | December 13 | Psy | "Daddy" † | 9,077 | |
| 844 | December 20 | Psy | "Daddy" † | 8,460 | |
| — | December 27 | Psy | "Daddy" † | 6,382 | |

== See also ==
- List of M Countdown Chart winners (2015)
- List of Music Bank Chart winners (2015)
- List of Show! Music Core Chart winners (2015)
