= One of These Nights (Red Velvet song) =

Single by Red Velvet

from the EP The Velvet
- Language: Korean
- Released: March 17, 2016
- Studio: S.M. Studios
- Genre: R&B; ballad
- Length: 4:21
- Label: SM; KT
- Songwriters: Seo Ji-eum; Hwang Chan-hee; Andreas Öberg; Maria Marcus
- Producers: Hwang Chan-hee; Andreas Öberg; Maria Marcus

Red Velvet singles chronology
"Wish Tree" (2015)	"One of These Nights" (2016)	"Russian Roulette" (2016)

Music video
- "One of These Nights" on YouTube

"One of These Nights" (Korean: 7월 7일; RR: 7 wol 7 il; lit. '"July 7"') is a song recorded by South Korean girl group Red Velvet. Composed by Hwang Chan-hee, Andreas Öberg, Maria Marcus and penned by Seo Ji-eum of Jam Factory, it was released as the lead single from their second extended play, The Velvet, which is also the group's first major release to focus on the 'Velvet' half of their unique dual concept, as a follow-up to their last album, The Red. "One of These Nights" is an R&B mid-tempo song with lyrics inspired by the story of Jingnyeo and Gyeonu, a folk tale conceived from the Korean festival Chilseok which originates from the Chinese Qixi Festival which falls on the seventh day of the seventh month on the lunisolar calendar. Originally intended to be released a day earlier, SM Entertainment delayed the song and album's release to March 17, 2016, to ensure its quality.

The single received generally favorable reviews from music critics who compared the song to the group's more upbeat releases, but praised the transition which was hailed as a bold move at a time when K-pop artists commonly aimed to release the catchiest dance hit. It was fairly successful in the group's native country South Korea, becoming their fourth top-ten hit on the Gaon Digital Chart and number six on Billboard's World Digital Songs chart.

== Background and release ==
Red Velvet is known in their country and internationally for their unique dual concept, characterized as their 'Red' and 'Velvet' sides. These two sides reflect the music they produce and the members' styling for each release. Their 'Red' image is described as their vivid and bold image, which generates their more upbeat songs while their softer, more mature 'Velvet' concept spawned tracks predominantly ballads and of the R&B genre. In September 2015, the group released their first studio album The Red which focused on the 'Red' side of their duality. During its promotions, the company hinted at a press conference for the album on September 8, 2015, that there will be a follow-up album to The Red which would focus on their 'Velvet' image. Although a representative of the group's company, S.M. Entertainment clarified that nothing had been scheduled yet, only a month later member Wendy confirmed during an interview that an album was "coming after The Red".

A statement from an S.M. Entertainment representative on March 2, 2016, revealed that the group had finished filming a music video for the lead single. Teasers of the members for the EP's release were unveiled on the group's official Instagram account on March 10, and S.M. Entertainment later revealed the single's title to be "7월7일 (One of These Nights)" which would be released on March 16. Ten minutes before its release, the company announced that the single, along with its music video and parent album would be released on March 17 instead "to guarantee a high quality of work". To appease their disappointed fans, the band apologized for the delay on the March 16 broadcast of the radio show 'Good Morning FM', where they also discussed their latest album and single.

== Composition ==
"One of These Nights"
"One of These Nights" is an R&B ballad with an orchestral arrangement and trap beat.

"One of These Nights" is branded as an R&B ballad with a polished rhythm. Jeff Benjamin of Fuse described it as a standard ballad which opens "with strings and piano before evolving into a sweeping, orchestral arrangement" until a trap beat kicks in at the 1:40 mark "to give the strings a modern flavor". On the other hand, Chester Chin of star2 called it a "haunting, downtrodden ballad". Tamar Herman of Billboard emphasized the track's "soaring piano, strings, and tinkling chimes" which sits beneath the group's voices "to build the song up to a dramatic finale". It was composed by Hwang Chan-hee, Andreas Öberg, Maria Marcus and penned by Seo Ji-eum of Jam Factory, in the key of F♯ minor and a tempo of 134 beats-per-minute. Öberg would later continue to contribute his work for the group's releases. Three other versions of the songs were also available upon its digital release, including the De-Capo version, the Joe Millionaire version and the piano version.

Lyrically, it is a song about heartbreak and longing, drawing inspiration from the Korean festival Chilseok from which, stems the tragic folktale about the lovers, Jingnyeo and Gyeonu who were separated and only allowed to meet once a year, on the seventh day of seventh month of the lunisolar calendar, hence the Korean title of the song that literally translates to "July 7". Member Seulgi described it as a sad song about two people in love who have to separate, like the couple from the original tale.

== Music video and promotion ==
Released in conjunction with the song, a music video directed by Shin Hee-won was released on March 17. Jeff Benjamin of Fuse opined that it felt like a continuation to the music video of their 2015 single "Automatic" with its transitions and dream-like scenes. The members' styling were compared to Disney princesses, where Irene is Snow White, Yeri passed out in a boat in a long pink gown is Sleeping Beauty, and Wendy with her bright red hair and fishtail dress is Ariel. This resemblance was once again noted by Yeri during a special broadcast through the Naver app V Live. Bradley Stern of PopCrush felt that it was "like a colorful M.C. Escher sketch brought to life". "One of These Nights" was the third most viewed K-pop music video in America and fifth worldwide for the month of March in 2016.

For the song's promotion, the group held a special broadcast on the Naver app V Live on March 15, 2016, revealing their new hairstyles for the first time. The girls also appeared on the March 16 broadcast of the radio show 'Good Morning FM' to discuss their album and new single. Red Velvet then began their music show promotions through a live performance of "One of These Nights" and another track from their album, "Cool Hot Sweet Love" on M! Countdown. They performed the song on other music programs such as Music Bank, Inkigayo, Show Champion, and eventually earned their first music show trophy for "One of These Nights" on the March 22, 2016 broadcast of The Show. For further promotions, they became guests on the March 16 episode of the MBC Every 1 variety show, Weekly Idol.

== Reception ==
Despite the contrast between "One of These Nights" and the group's more recent releases, it received generally positive reviews from music critics. Tamar Herman of Billboard commented that "it's nice to see Red Velvet turn back to their velvety side", and also added that while the song is "not as bouncy as 'Dumb Dumb'", it is no less captivating. She also praised the vocals, stating that it's "one of the group's most expressive vocal performances to date". Jeff Benjamin of Fuse called the transition "a remarkably bold move for the group, at a time when every K-pop act is looking to score its boldest, catchiest dance hit". Writing for The Star, Chester Chin noted that it's "uncomfortably uncharacteristic upon first listen" because of the group's past songs which were more upbeat, but praised its indie sensibilities as "an assured step in the right direction" in a time where majority of the releases from K-pop "focus on the brash and bombastic".

== Commercial performance ==
"One of These Nights" was fairly successful domestically. The song debuted and peaked at number ten on the Gaon Digital Chart. The song sold over 229,350 digital units within its first month of release. Elsewhere, it became the group's fifth consecutive top-ten entry on Billboard's World Digital Songs chart, peaking at number six on the week of April 9, 2016.

== Charts ==
=== Weekly charts ===
Chart (2016)	Peak position
South Korean Gaon Digital Chart	10
US World Digital Songs (Billboard)	6

=== Monthly chart ===
Chart (2016)	Peak position
South Korean Gaon Digital Chart	29

== Accolades ==
Music program awards
Program	Date
The Show (SBS MTV)	March 22, 2016
Show Champion (MBC Music)	March 23, 2016
M Countdown (Mnet)	March 24, 2016
Music Bank (KBS)	March 25, 2016
Inkigayo (SBS)	March 27, 2016

== Release history ==
Region	Date	Format	Label
South Korea	March 17, 2016	Digital download, streaming	S.M. Entertainment, KT Music
Various	March 17, 2016	Digital download, streaming	S.M. Entertainment

== See also ==
- List of M Countdown Chart winners (2016)
- List of Inkigayo Chart winners (2016)
