= The Velvet =

EP by Red Velvet
- Released: March 17, 2016
- Studios: SM Studios (Seoul, South Korea)
- Genre: R&B
- Length: 33:03
- Languages: Korean; English
- Labels: SM; Dreamus
- Producers: Andreas Öberg; Daniel Klein; Charli Taft; Deez; Maria Marcus; Kenzie

Red Velvet chronology
The Red (2015)	The Velvet (2016)	Russian Roulette (2016)

Singles from The Velvet
- 1. "One of These Nights" Released: March 17, 2016

The Velvet is the second Korean extended play by South Korean girl group Red Velvet. Released on March 17, 2016, by SM Entertainment and distributed by Dreamus, the extended play is the spiritual successor of their first full-length album The Red, which was released in September 2015. In contrast to their vivid and bright "red" image on The Red, The Velvet finds the group embracing their smooth and softer "velvet" image, incorporating mainly the R&B genre. S.M. founder Lee Soo-man continued to act as the executive producer of the extended play, with Andreas Öberg, Daniel "Obi" Klein, Charli Taft, Deez, Maria Marcus, Kenzie, as well as others contributed both lyrics and production.

Upon its release, The Velvet received positive reviews from critics for clarifying the girl group's dual musical concept and their sophisticated R&B sound. The extended play also achieved commercial success, becoming their third consecutive number one on Gaon Album Chart. It also peaked at number eight on the Billboard World Albums Chart, earning the group's third top-ten entry on the chart.

Promotion for the album was preceded by the release of the lead single "One of These Nights" on the same release day, along with live performances on weekly music shows for both the single and the album track "Cool Hot Sweet Love". The lead single was a moderate commercial success, peaking at number ten on the Gaon Digital Chart and number six on Billboard's World Digital Songs chart.

== Background and release ==
While promoting The Red at a press conference on September 8, 2015, the members and the company hinted at a similar follow-up concept release to their previous release, although an SM Entertainment representative clarified that nothing had been scheduled yet. In October 2015, Wendy confirmed on an interview that an album was "coming after The Red", seemingly clarified that a similar concept album was in the process.

On March 2, 2016, an SM Entertainment representative revealed that the group had completed filming a music video for the album's lead single. SM Entertainment began dropping teasers of the members on the group's official Instagram account on March 10 and later confirmed a March 16 release date and the lead single "One of These Nights". The single is described as an R&B ballad with a polished rhythm.

=== Delay ===
Ten minutes before its intended release on March 16, SM Entertainment announced that the music video and album's release would be delayed to March 17 "to guarantee a high quality of work". The band apologized to their disappointed fans on the March 16 broadcast of Good Morning FM, where they talked about their new album and its lead single.

== Composition ==
=== Concept ===
As their first extended play introduced both the "Red" and "Velvet" musical concept, follow-up full-length release The Red in September 2015 saw the group embrace their quirky, "fun, peppy" pop side. With The Velvet, the group focuses solely on their "velvet" sound and image, incorporating mainly the R&B genre with a more sultry, smooth and elegant approach. It was later proceeded by the group's second studio album Perfect Velvet in 2017, and their fifth extended play RBB in 2018, which focus on the group's more mature "velvet" sound.

=== Songs ===
"One of These Nights"
"One of These Nights" is an R&B ballad with an orchestral arrangement and trap beat.

The extended play consists of five new songs and three remixes for "One of These Nights". Described as an R&B ballad with a polished rhythm, the lead single was composed by Hwang Chan-hee, Andreas Öberg & Maria Marcus and penned by Seo Ji-eum of Jam Factory, who also wrote the lyrics for their hit "Dumb Dumb". Jeff Benjamin of Fuse described it as a standard ballad which opens "with strings and piano before evolving into a sweeping, orchestral arrangement" until a trap beat kicks in at the 1:40 mark "to give the strings a modern flavor". Three other versions of the song: the normal version, the De-Capo version, the Joe Millionaire version and the Piano version were all included. The song also drew inspiration from the Korean festival Chilseok, which is celebrated on the seventh the day of the seventh month (hence the Korean title "7월7일"). The original tale tells the story of lovers Jingnyeo and Gyeonu, who were separated by the heavenly king and only allowed to meet on the seventh day of the seventh month of the lunar calendar.

Other compositions of the extended play include the Daniel "Obi" Klein and Charli Taft-assisted "Cool Hot Sweet Love", the 90's R&B flavored "Light Me Up" and "First Time". "Light Me Up" marked the first production from songwriter and producer Deez to the group, who would later participate more frequently in many of the quintet's releases, while "First Time" was written and produced solely by S.M.'s longtime songwriter and producer Kenzie. Initially a 1989 song by SM Entertainment founder Lee Soo-man, "Rose Scent Breeze" was covered by member Wendy, Seulgi and Joy and included as the last song for the extended play.

== Promotion ==
Red Velvet held a special broadcast through Naver's V app on March 15, showing their new hairstyles for the first time as they talked about their preparations for their 'comeback'. After the announcement of their album's delay, the group appeared on the March 16 broadcast of Good Morning FM to talk about the album "One of These Nights". The group also held another special broadcast on the V app hours before the album's release. Red Velvet started their promotions on music shows through M! Countdown where they performed both the lead single and a shortened version of "Cool Hot Sweet Love". Red Velvet won their first music show trophy for the song on March 22 on The Show.

== Reception ==
Professional ratings
Review scores
Source	Rating
IZM	2.5/5 stars
The Star	7/10

Billboard writer Tamar Herman praised the lead single as "the group's most expressive vocal performances to date" and "no less captivating" than their previous single "Dumb Dumb". The Star's Chester Chin praised the album's "languorous build-up", adding that One of These Nights' "indie sensibilities" is an "assured step in the right direction" for the girl group. A mixed review from writer Jeong Min-jae found the extended play to be "lukewarm" and "particularly shabby" compared to their previous release, citing "Cool Hot Sweet Love" and "Rose Scent Breeze" as the stand-out tracks nonetheless. In a separated top 25 Red Velvet songs by Billboard, "Light Me Up" was included at number 17 as the song "displays how effortlessly the group can slip into, and conquer, velvety R&B".

== Commercial performance ==
On the week of March 19, 2016, The Velvet debuted at number one on the weekly Gaon Album Chart, becoming the group's third consecutive chart-topper. Except for the three remixes of "One of These Nights", all five original tracks also charted on the Gaon Digital Chart in the same week. With 48,866 copies sold, The Velvet was the 60th best-selling album in 2016 on the year-end Gaon Album Chart, and has since sold more than 80,000 copies as of September 2022. The extended play also performed moderately on Billboard's World Albums Chart, peaking at number eight on the week of April 2, 2016. Elsewhere, the album also debuted and peaked at No. 75 on the Japanese Oricon Albums Chart, earning a total sales of over 2,100 copies.

== Track listing ==
The Velvet track listing
No.	Title	Lyrics	Music	Arrangement	Length
1.	"One of These Nights" (Korean: 7월 7일; RR: 7 wol 7 il; lit. 'July 7th')	Seo Ji-eum	Hwang Chan-hee; Andreas Öberg; Maria Marcus	Hwang Chan-hee; Lee Seung-joo; Hong So-jin	4:21
2.	"Cool Hot Sweet Love"	Kenzie	Daniel "Obi" Klein; Charli Taft; Michael Nordmark; Thomas Sardorf	Daniel "Obi" Klein; Charli Taft; Michael Nordmark; Thomas Sardorf	3:53
3.	"Light Me Up"	Kenzie	Kenzie; Deez; Rodnae "Chikk" Bell	Deez	3:32
4.	"First Time" (Korean: 처음인가요; RR: Cheoeumingayo; lit. 'Is this Your First Time?')	Kenzie	Kenzie	Kenzie	4:02
5.	"Rose Scent Breeze" (Korean: 장미꽃 향기는 바람에 날리고; RR: Jangmikkot hyanggineun barame nalligo) (sung by Seulgi, Wendy, Joy)	Jung Hye-kyung	Hong Jong-hwa	Park Geun-cheol; Jung Soo-min	4:52
6.	"One of These Nights" (De-Capo version)	Seo Ji-eum	Hwang Chan-hee; Andreas Öberg; Maria Marcus	Noah "I-Create" Nwachukwu (De-Capo Music Group); Droyd (De-Capo Music Group); Rod Bonner	4:11
7.	"One of These Nights" (Joe Millionaire version)	Seo Ji-eum	Hwang Chan-hee; Andreas Öberg; Maria Marcus	Joe "Joe Millionaire" Foster	4:07
8.	"One of These Nights" (Piano version)	Seo Ji-eum	Hwang Chan-hee; Andreas Öberg; Maria Marcus	Hwang Chan-hee; Andreas Öberg; Maria Marcus	4:05
Total length:					33:28

== Charts ==
=== Weekly charts ===
Chart (2016)	Peak position
Japanese Albums (Oricon)	75
South Korea (Gaon Album Chart)	1
US Billboard World Albums	8

=== Monthly charts ===
Chart (2016)	Peak position
South Korean (Gaon Album Chart)	2

=== Year-end charts ===
Chart (2016)	Peak position
South Korea (Gaon Album Chart)	60

== Sales ==
Chart	Amount
Gaon physical sales	56,944+
Oricon physical sales	2,104+

== Release history ==
Region	Date	Format	Label
Various	March 17, 2016	Digital download	SM Entertainment
South Korea	March 17, 2016	CD, digital download	SM Entertainment, KT Music
