= Dumb Dumb (Red Velvet song) =

Single by Red Velvet

from the album The Red
- Released: September 9, 2015
- Genre: Dance-pop
- Length: 3:22
- Label: S.M.; KT
- Composers: LDN Noise; Deanna Dellacioppa; Taylor Parks; Ryan S. Jhun
- Lyricists: Seo Ji-eum; Kim Dong-hyun

Red Velvet singles chronology
"Ice Cream Cake" (2015)	"Dumb Dumb" (2015)	"Wish Tree" (2015)

Music video
- "Dumb Dumb" on YouTube

"Dumb Dumb" is a song by South Korean girl group Red Velvet for their first studio album The Red (2015). It was written by Seo Ji-eum of Jam Factory, Kim Dong-hyun, LDN Noise, Deanna Dellacioppa, Tayla Parx, and Ryan S. Jhun. An uptempo dance-pop track, its lyrics conveys a girl expressing her awkwardness regarding her feelings towards the object of her affections. It was released as the lead single of The Red on September 8, 2015 by SM Entertainment, along with an accompanying music video.

"Dumb Dumb" received positive reviews from critics, who praised its production and the group's vocal delivery—regarding it as one of the group's signature "red" concept songs. It attained commercial success, peaking at number two on Gaon Digital Chart and number three on Billboard's World Digital Songs chart. The song has since been named by Dazed Digital as their top K-pop track of 2015 and was ranked at #70 on Billboard's 100 Greatest Girl Group Songs of All Time. Its music video was also included in Rolling Stone's 10 Best Music Videos of 2015.

== Background and release ==
Following the release of their first EP Ice Cream Cake in March 2015, it was reported that Red Velvet would return with their first full-length studio album in early September 2015. On September 3, a series of image teasers were revealed on the group's official Instagram account, along with the album's ten-song track list. A day later, S.M. Entertainment announced that the full album would be released at midnight on September 9, with "Dumb Dumb" serving as the album's lead single.

Prior to the release of the music video, a total of 5 video teasers were released on the official SMTOWN channel from September 3 to 7. The official video for "Dumb Dumb" was then released on September 9, before being released digitally with its parent album a day later.

== Composition ==
"Dumb Dumb"
A 20-second sample of "Dumb Dumb", a pop dance song by Red Velvet

"Dumb Dumb" was composed by British production team LDN Noise, Deanna Dellacioppa, Taylor Parks and South Korean songwriter Ryan S. Jhun. LDN Noise had previously worked with Western artists such as Nick Jonas and Nathan Sykes and although the duo had produced for other South Korean groups such as Red Velvet's label mates TVXQ and SHINee, The Red, in which they produced four tracks including "Dumb Dumb", marks Bonnick and Chapman's first time collaborating with the group. Described as a "brassy" and "genre-mashing" dance-pop track with R&B, funk and hip-hop elements, the song contains heavy hi-hats and snare line, percussive claps and horn instruments. It was composed in the key of C Dorian mode, with a tempo of 146 beat-per-minute.

Its lyrics, which were written by Kim Dong-hyun and Seo Ji-eum of Jam Factory, are the thoughts of a girl who compares her awkwardness in front of a romantic interest to becoming a mannequin. The song's title is repeated several times throughout the song and features a rap verse that contain several song references from Michael Jackson's discography, including "Beat It", "Bad", "Billie Jean", "Leave Me Alone", "Black or White", "Man in the Mirror", "Why You Wanna Trip On Me", "Scream", "Love Never Felt So Good" and "Thriller". A Japanese version of the song was recorded for the group's first Japan showcase, making "Dumb Dumb" their second song to be recorded in another language, following their 2017 release "Red Flavor".

== Music video and promotion ==
=== Music video ===
Directed by Beomjin J, a music video of the song was released on September 8, 2015, through the official YouTube channel of S.M. Entertainment. Set in a doll factory where all five members are seemingly being manufactured, the girls dance in colorful sets and sing about their frustrations with their awkwardness as they deal with feelings towards the object of their affections. Alluding to the song's lyrics, the video itself, which was choreographed by Willdabeast Adams, features a robotic dance with movements like that of a mannequin's. Rolling Stone claimed the video "stood out with a distinct aesthetic and muted palate" and that "any of the dozens of the setups packed into it could appear in the pages of your favorite oversized, overpriced lookbook". The girls' outfits and styling, particularly their braided hairstyles and striking red dresses with different colored aprons, were compared to Pippi Longstockings, Alice from Alice in Wonderland and Little Red Riding Hood.

=== Promotion ===
Red Velvet started their promotions for the album and single by holding a comeback showcase for the first time since their debut. There, they talked about the song and the album. The group performed "Dumb Dumb" live for the first time on M! Countdown on September 10 and also appeared on Music Bank, Show! Music Core and Inkigayo where they also performed "Huff N' Puff". A week later, they received their first music show trophy for "Dumb Dumb" on The Show, and gained a total of five wins for the song on all of the music programs in South Korea. The group then continued to perform the song for the rest of 2015, before ending with year-end performances at Seoul Music Awards, KBS 2015 Song Festival and Golden Disk Awards in January 2016, where they performed a remix version of "Dumb Dumb", which was extended with a dance-break section. As part of their year-end award promotions, three remixes were produced for the group's performance at the Seoul Music Awards, the KBS 2015 Song Festival and the Golden Disk Awards in January 2016. While these mixes maintain most of the song's original production, the rap verse by member Irene and Joy was omitted in favor of an additional dance-break mix for the performances on Song Festival and Golden Disk Awards.

Initially recorded and performed in Korean, a Japanese version of the song was performed for the first time during the group's first Japan showcase in November 2017, along with "Red Flavor".

== Critical reception ==
Upon its initial release, "Dumb Dumb" received positive reviews from music critics who complimented the song's production and quirky vibe, while noting the group's "well-blended" vocal performance. Jeff Benjamin of Billboard called it an "undefined-yet-addictive slab of brassy pop" and drew comparisons to Jessie J, Ariana Grande and Nicki Minaj's 2014 hit "Bang Bang", but clarified that it "is pulled every which way that it hardly resembles such a catered-to-Top-40 hit". Dazed Digital named it their number one K-pop track of 2015 and stated that the song "marked a monumental, career-crowning musical tornado". Noisey put it at number two on their Top 20 K-pop Songs of 2015 and praised it for its "endless momentum—sustained across a Michael Jackson tribute rap break, a blindside bridge borrowed from some other sonic world, and a chorus that interrupts itself to laugh at all the awesomeness everywhere". They also highlighted the song's video and choreography. Writing for Yibada, Romellaine Xyene Arsenio commended the members' impressive vocal improvement and thought the "challenging notes and raps were delivered smoothly". She deemed it "their most bizarre comeback yet" but spoke highly of the visuals and styling in the music video. However, Kim Do-young of the South Korean online magazine IZM found the song "confusing" and the vocals of the group "distracting" in his review of the album. In a survey conducted in November 2017 among men in their 20s and 50s, "Dumb Dumb" ranked 4th in the list of songs that should be banned for the College Scholastic Ability Test in South Korea due to their addictive nature.

"Dumb Dumb" was included in Billboard's list of 100 Greatest Girl Group Songs of All Time, ranking at number 70. Rolling Stone placed it a number nine on their 10 Best Music Videos of 2015 and was named "Choreography of the Year" by GQ Korea in their November 2015 issue. The song also placed fourth on the top 25 Red Velvet songs by critics on Billboard.

"Dumb Dumb" on listicles
Critic/Publication	List	Rank	Ref.
Billboard	100 Greatest Girl Group Songs of All Time	70	
British GQ	Best K-Pop songs of the decade	—	
Dazed	The top 20 K-Pop tracks of 2015	1	
Medium	25 Best K-Pop Songs of the 2010s	1	
Rolling Stone	10 Best Music Videos of 2015	9	
Vice	The Top 20 K-pop Songs of 2015	2	

== Commercial performance ==
"Dumb Dumb" debuted and peaked at number two on the Gaon Digital Chart on the week of September 6, 2015, marking their third top-five entry and the group's highest peak on the chart at the time. The song eventually became the group's first single to achieve over a million downloads in South Korea and is currently one of the group's most downloaded hits in their native country, having achieved a total of 1,611,205 downloads as of July 2016. "Dumb Dumb" ended up being the 77th biggest hit on the 2015 Year-end Gaon Digital Chart, marking their second appearance along with their previous single "Ice Cream Cake" placing at number 46. It also peaked at number three on Billboard's World Digital Songs chart, making it the best-selling K-pop song in America of the week and the group's fifth consecutive top-ten entry on the chart. The song has since achieved 26,000 downloads in the United States, becoming their second most-downloaded song after "Bad Boy".

The music video for "Dumb Dumb" debuted at #1 on YinYueTai's V-Chart Korea and was also the most viewed K-pop video in America and worldwide for the month of September.

== Accolades ==
"Dumb Dumb" received a nomination for Song of the Month for September 2015 at the 6th Gaon Chart Music Awards. It achieved the top spots and several South Korean music program charts, including two times on M Countdown.

Music program awards
Program	Date	Ref.
The Show (SBS MTV)	September 15, 2015	
Show Champion (MBC M)	September 16, 2015	
M Countdown (Mnet)	September 17, 2015	
M Countdown (Mnet)	September 24, 2015	
Inkigayo (SBS)	September 20, 2015	

== Usage in media ==
Members of the boy group BtoB performed the song on a 2016 episode of The Boss Is Watching.

== Credits and personnel ==
Credits adapted from the liner notes of The Red.

=== Studio ===
- Ingrid Studio – recording, digital editing
- SM Blue Cup Studio – mixing
- Sterling Sound – mastering

=== Personnel ===
- SM Entertainment – executive producer
- Lee Soo-man – producer
- Kim Young-min – executive supervisor
- Red Velvet – vocals, background vocals
- Seo Ji-eum – lyrics
- Kim Dong-hyun – lyrics
- Kenzie – vocal directing
- Deanna Dellacioppa – composition, arrangement
- LDN Noise – composition, arrangement
- Taylor Parks – composition, arrangement, background vocals
- Ryan S. Jhun – composition, arrangement
- Jung Eun-kyung – recording, digital editing
- Jung Eui-seok – mixing
- Tom Coyne – mastering

== Charts ==
=== Weekly charts ===
Chart (2015)	Peak position
China Weekly Music Charts (Baidu)	14
South Korean Gaon Digital Chart	2
South Korean Gaon Download Chart	1
US World Digital Songs (Billboard)	3

=== Year-end charts ===
Chart (2015)	Position
South Korean Gaon Digital Chart	77

=== Monthly chart ===
Chart (2015)	Peak position
South Korea (Gaon Digital Chart)	5

== Release history ==
Release dates and formats for "Dumb Dumb"
Region	Date	Format(s)	Label(s)	Ref.
Various	September 9, 2015	Digital download; streaming	SM Entertainment; KT Music	

== Jang Jane, Giant Pink, and Perc%nt version ==
In 2017, S.M.'s partnership with Mystic Entertainment resulted in a digital music project involving Red Velvet, Henry Lau and Mystic Entertainment's artists, wherein both companies' singers did a remake of each other's songs. PERC%NT, Jang Jane, Giant Pink and K JUN's R&B cover of the single was released on August 18, 2017, along with a music video.

== See also ==
- List of M Countdown Chart winners (2015)
- List of Inkigayo Chart winners (2015)
