= Charli Taft =

British singer and songwriter

- Born: Charlotte Taft; 3 September 1991 (age 34); Liverpool, England
- Occupations: Singer, songwriter
- Spouse: Daniel Obi Klein (m. 2018)
- Musical career
- Genres: R&B
- Instrument: Vocals

Charlotte Taft (born 3 September 1991), professionally known as Charli Taft, is a British singer and songwriter.

She released her debut single "Pieces" in 2015 and has since been writing music for various Western artists and South Korean artists, most notably for groups under SM Entertainment, who also produced a single for her in 2017. She regularly collaborates with her husband Daniel "Obi" Klein in producing and composing music.

== Early life ==
Charlotte Taft was born in Liverpool, England, to parents who both taught music at Liverpool Community College. Taft, the oldest of two children, was raised in what she calls "a very vibrant, musical household" which influenced her to pursue a career in music. From her childhood, she had aspirations to enter the music industry and sang at local talent shows and concerts. She appeared on a Disney Channel show when she was 12, singing on national television for the first time. At age 15, she was writing songs for herself which she stated she started performing for "anyone who would listen".

Taft attended Merchant Taylor's school and St. Edward's College and then completed her degree at the Liverpool Institute for Performing Arts. There she won the Beatles Songwriting Prize and gained a first class honours degree in performance. She was chosen to meet Paul McCartney for a private one-to-one songwriting tutorial. Taft then moved to London to look for work and later joined teams in Scandinavia as a hired writer.

== Career ==
When she was starting out as a songwriter, Taft made around a dozen trips to Stockholm and Copenhagen, where she wrote for some of the most prominent names in the music industry. In 2014, she was one of 14 acts awarded funding of over £250,000 by the British government as part of a plan to promote their artists overseas. She then used this money to travel to Seoul to start writing for South Korean artists.

While still in Europe, Taft met fellow songwriter Daniel "Obi" Klein, with whom she would later collaborate on a number of songs, at a songwriting camp in Copenhagen. They wrote the song "Lips" which was released by South Korean girl group Girls' Generation in 2013 as a track from their third Japanese studio album Love & Peace. The group's company S.M. Entertainment invited Taft to come to Seoul and take part in songwriting camps at SM Studios. In 2014, she co-produced a song for Japanese artist Namie Amuro and in August, S.M. Entertainment artist and Shinee member Taemin released "Ace", which Taft composed with Klein, Deez and Ylva Dimberg, as a track from his first extended play of the same name.

On Taft's first trip to South Korea, she wrote the song "Automatic" with Klein; it was released in 2015 by another S.M. Entertainment girl group, Red Velvet, as one of two singles they promoted for their first extended play Ice Cream Cake. Months later, she and Klein co-produced another song for the group titled "Time Slip" which was a track in their first studio album The Red. In the same year, she released her debut single "Pieces" on 30 November.

She collaborated with Klein again in 2016 for another Red Velvet track, "Cool Hot Sweet Love", which featured on their second extended play, The Velvet. In January 2017, S.M. Entertainment's first girl group S.E.S. released their reunion album, 14 years after their disbandment, which included a track co-written by Taft, Klein, Lee Hyun-seung, DOM and Teddy Riley. In May, another song she wrote with Klein was released as a single by South Korean girl group Loona, titled "Eclipse". She would later write two more songs for the group in the same year, one for the group's sub-unit Odd Eye Circle called "Sweet Crazy Love" which was chosen by Billboard as one of their 20 Best K-pop Songs of 2017. On 28 July, Taft released the single "Love Like You" along with an accompanying music video as part of the second season of S.M. Entertainment's digital music project, SM Station. The song had been written for herself while still in the UK and she had planned on releasing it independently before a representative of the company approached her at a lunch meeting in Copenhagen about being involved in the project. Taft once again worked with Red Velvet for their second studio album Perfect Velvet which has two songs co-written by Taft, "Look" and "Perfect 10". In December, she collaborated with Klein and Andreas Öberg for the song "Christmas Without You" which Girls' Generation member Taeyeon released as a track for her Christmas album This Christmas: Winter Is Coming.

== Personal life ==
On 1 September 2018, Taft married Klein.

== Discography ==
=== Singles ===
Year	Single	Album
2015	"Pieces"	Non-album singles
2017	"Iz It Good 2 U x 2On"	Non-album singles
2017	"Love Like You"	SM Station
2019	"Like Me"	DLUXLIFE
2020	"Up Next"	Non-album singles
2021	"Oh!"	DLUXLIFE
2021	"Money Can't Buy"	DLUXLIFE
2021	"Sentimental"	DLUXLIFE
2022	"Wish I Could"	DLUXLIFE
2022	"Ride" (featuring Justin Starling)	DLUXLIFE

=== As a featured artist ===
Year	Single
2013	"I See" (with Yousef)
2014	"Higher Ground" (with Blonde)
2019	"In Touch" (with DAUL)

=== Songwriting credits ===
Year	Artist	Song	Album
2013	Girls' Generation	"Lips"	Love & Peace
2014	Namie Amuro	"Neonlight Lipstick"	Tsuki
2014	Taemin	"Ace"	Ace
2014	Samantha Jade	"Sweet Talk"	Nine
2015	Red Velvet	"Automatic"	Ice Cream Cake
2015	Red Velvet	"Somethin' Kinda Crazy"	Ice Cream Cake
2015	Red Velvet	"Time Slip"	The Red
2016	Red Velvet	"Cool Hot Sweet Love"	The Velvet
2017	S.E.S.	"Hush"	Remember
2017	Loona	"Eclipse"	Kim Lip
2017	Loona	"Puzzle"	Choerry
2017	Henry & Sunny	"U&I"	SM Station
2017	Odd Eye Circle	"Sweet Crazy Love"	Max & Match
2017	Red Velvet	"Look"	Perfect Velvet
2017	Red Velvet	"Perfect 10"	Perfect Velvet
2017	Taeyeon	"Christmas Without You"	This Christmas: Winter Is Coming
2018	Super Junior	"Lo Siento" (feat. Leslie Grace & Play-N-Skillz)	Replay
2018	Yuri	"Butterfly"	The First Scene
2019	DAUL	"In Touch" (feat. Charli Taft)	In Touch
2019	Exo	"Non Stop"	Obsession
2020	SuperM	"Step Up"	Super One
2020	SuperM	"Line 'Em Up"	Super One
2020	GWSN	"Tweaks ~ Heavy cloud but no rain"	The Keys
2020	The Boyz	"Shine Shine"	Chase
2022	Viviz	"#Flashback"	Summer Vibe
2022	Girls' Generation	"Seventeen"	Forever 1
2022	Le Sserafim	"Impurities"	Antifragile
2023	Viviz	"Love or Die"	Various
2023	Le Sserafim	"No-Return (Into the Unknown)"	Unforgiven
2023	NCT 127	"Misty"	Fact Check
2024	Nayeon	"Magic"	Na
2024	Red Velvet	"Bubble"	Cosmic
2024	Seventeen	"Love, Money, Fame"	Spill the Feels
2025	TWICE	"Me+You"	Ten: The Story Goes On
