= The Red (album) =

- Digital cover

Studio album by Red Velvet
- Released: September 9, 2015
- Studios: SM Studios (Seoul, South Korea)
- Genres: Dance-pop; electropop; R&B; funk; hip hop
- Length: 33:05
- Languages: Korean; English
- Labels: SM; Dreamus
- Producers: LDN Noise; Ryan S. Jhun; DR; Dsign Music; Kenzie; Daniel Klein; Charli Taft; Jinbo; Dem Jointz

Red Velvet chronology
Ice Cream Cake (2015)	The Red (2015)	The Velvet (2016)

Singles from The Red
- 1. "Dumb Dumb" Released: September 9, 2015

The Red is the debut studio album by South Korean girl group Red Velvet. It was released on September 9, 2015, by SM Entertainment and distributed by Dreamus. LDN Noise, Ryan S. Jhun, Denzil "DR" Remedios, Dsign Music, Kenzie, Deekay, Charli Taft, Jinbo, Dem Jointz, as well as others, handled production of the album, with SM founder Lee Soo-man serving as the executive producer. The record primarily showcases the group's "red" image with "fun, peppy" pop-oriented musical styles.

Upon its release, The Red received positive reviews from music critics who complimented its musical diversity. Commercially, the album became Red Velvet's second chart-topper on the Gaon Album Chart in South Korea. Internationally, it became the group's first number one album on the Billboard World Album Chart, while peaking at number twenty-four on Billboard's Heatseekers Albums chart. It was later included as Billboard's 10 Best K-pop Albums of 2015.

The lead single "Dumb Dumb" was released alongside The Red, with live performances on weekly music shows for both "Dumb Dumb" and album track "Huff 'n' Puff" commencing shortly afterwards. The lead single peaked at number two on the Gaon Digital Chart and number three on Billboard's World Digital Songs chart while becoming one of the group's signature "red" singles.

== Background and release ==
Following the group's first major release Ice Cream Cake in March 2015, SM Entertainment announced that Red Velvet would be returning with their first full album in early September. On September 3, a series of image teasers were revealed on the group's official Instagram account, along with the album's tracklist. On September 4, the company announced that the full album would be released at midnight on September 9, with "Dumb Dumb" serving as the lead single. A series of video teasers was released starting September 4, including song previews for "Huff 'n' Puff", "Don't U Wait No More", "Time Slip", "Dumb Dumb" and "Red Dress". The music video for the song was released on September 8 while the full album was released on September 9. There are two physical versions for the album, a ’’Red’’ version and a ’’Blue’’ version.

== Composition ==
=== Concept ===
Following the group's concept of promoting with both "Red" and "Velvet" images (preceded by their first EP in March 2015), The Red focuses solely on their vivid and strong "Red" image, while seeing the girl group embraces their "fun, peppy" pop-oriented side. While talking about the album at a press conference on September 8, the members and the company also hinted at a similar conceptual promotion that will follow suit after The Red, although an SM Entertainment representative explained that nothing has been scheduled in particular yet. The album was later succeeded by The Red Summer (2017) and Summer Magic (2018), Red Velvet's summer special extended plays which portray a brighter, more vibrant "Red" sound of the group.

=== Songs ===
"Dumb Dumb"
A 20-second sample of "Dumb Dumb", a pop dance song by Red Velvet

The album consists of ten songs, with the main genres being dance-pop and R&B. The opening track and lead single "Dumb Dumb" is described as "an uptempo dance track" with "infectious hook" and "groovy beat". Heavily influenced by funk and hip-hop elements, the song is composed by producer Ryan S. Jhun and British production team LDN Noise, the latter whom have previously written and produced songs for fellow SM Entertainment labelmates Shinee and TVXQ. The lyrics describes a girl's awkwardness in front of the person of her affection, comparing herself to that of a mannequin. The rap section of "Dumb Dumb" includes several references to Michael Jackson's song discography, such as "Beat It", "Bad", "Billie Jean" and "Thriller". It is followed by "Huff 'n' Puff", an electro-pop song that features a dubstep-like breakdown that sings about waking up from a dream and coming back to reality, like Alice falling down the rabbit hole. The third track "Campfire" is described as an R&B pop song that has an ear-catching rhythmical guitar intro. The fourth track "Red Dress" is a dominant dance-pop track with much synth running through the song, clapping-like snare and marching-influenced drumline which tells a story in which a girl wears a red dress and clumsily but slyly tempts a man who treats her only as a child. The soulful, R&B-flavored "Oh Boy" showcases the group's singing ability and harmonization. LDN Noise also produced tracks 3–5 and Ryan S. Jhun also co-produced tracks 3–4, with additional production by Denzil "DR" Remedios on "Campfire" and Dsign Music on "Red Dress".

The latter half of The Red starts with the sixth track "Lady's Room", an uptempo R&B, synth-pop song that sings about the sisterhood between girls and the happy moments they share. It was one of three tracks produced by Daniel "Obi" Klein along with the next track "Time Slip", which is a 90s-influenced hip hop-based R&B song with lyrics that describes the laziness and listlessness that one feels while going back and forth between dream and reality in the morning. "Time Slip" also sees the participation of British songwriter Charli Taft, who had previously co-written and produced "Automatic" along with Daniel Klein, while marking the first collaboration from South Korean music producer Jinbo for the girl group. The eighth track "Don't U Wait No More" highlights the group's harmonization over a heavy synth production with a harmonized "Don't you wait no more" hook, with the lyrics revolving around a girl trying to get closer to her hesitant boyfriend, followed by the bossa nova-influenced midtempo pop-rock track "Day 1", which describes the feeling of new love by combining the electric, funky guitar sound and the melodic piano with the vocals of the members. The album ends with "Cool World", a synth-pop uptempo song with hopeful lyrics about embracing and living as themselves.

== Promotion ==
Promoting activities for the album started with a "comeback showcase" by Red Velvet where they performed "Dumb Dumb." They also appeared on a 5-episode live broadcast through the V Live app called Satisfying Five Senses! Red vs Velvet (Korean: 오방만족! Red VS Velvet) where they discussed the various concepts of their new album. The first episode was broadcast on September 7. The second episode was broadcast on September 8, with Shinee's Key as the MC. The group made their first comeback stage on M! Countdown on September 10, followed by performances on Music Bank, Show! Music Core and Inkigayo. The group also performed a shortened version "Huff 'n' Puff" on the shows during their first week of promotion. The Red was further promoted by Red Velvet on their Red Room Tour of Asia in 2017, alongside their other releases from 2014 to their latest release The Red Summer at the time.

== Reception ==
Professional ratings
Review scores
Source	Rating
IZM	2.5/5 stars

Upon its release, The Red received positive reviews from critics for the group embracing their "quirky" side. Billboard's Jeff Benjamin called The Red "an impressive, solid debut album" and stated that it "indicates big things for the act that needs to follow in the footsteps of their beloved female label mates Girls' Generation and f(x)." while Noisey stated that it's "perhaps the strongest top-to-bottom K-pop album to date," praising its "daredevil song forms, harmonies richer and smarter than anything on western dials in a quarter-century, and nonstop virtuoso songsmith hooks—without so much as a single English inflection out of place."

In a mixed review from IZM, writer Kim Do-hyun commented that the album "should have been accompanied with more careful judgments", giving the album two and a half stars, though highlighting tracks like "Campfire", "Oh Boy", "Day 1" and "Cool World". Billboard also included it in their '10 Best K-Pop Albums of 2015' and called it "one of the year's most enjoyable and experimental pop LPs." The single "Dumb Dumb" was later included at #70 on Billboard's list of 100 Greatest Girl Group Songs of All Time, praising its hooks and being one of "the most addictive singles in pop". Four songs from The Red were named among the top 25 Red Velvet songs by Billboard: "Dumb Dumb" at number 4, "Cool World" at number 13, "Time Slip" at number 15, and lastly "Red Dress" at number 21.

== Commercial performance ==
On the week of September 6, 2015, The Red debuted atop the weekly Gaon Album Chart, becoming the group's second chart-topper after Ice Cream Cake in March 2015. All ten tracks charted on the Gaon Digital Chart in the same week. With 46,571 copies sold, The Red was the 53rd best-selling album in 2015 on the year-end Gaon Album Chart, and has since achieved a cumulative sales of almost 80,000 copies as of August 2018. It also attained success in the United States, becoming their first release to top the Billboard World Albums Chart, and peaked at number 24 on its Heatseekers Albums chart, having a total of 3,000 copies sold as of March 30, 2018. In Japan, the album also debuted at number 47 on the Oricon Albums Chart with almost 4,500 copies sold.

== Accolades ==
Year	Award show	Category	Result	Ref.
2016	Golden Disc Awards	Album Bonsang	Nominated	

== Track listing ==
The Red track listing
No.	Title	Lyrics	Music	Arrangement	Length
1.	"Dumb Dumb"	Seo Ji-eum; Kim Dong-hyun	Greg Bonnick; Hayden Chapman; Deanna Dellacioppa; Taylor Parks; Ryan S. Jhun	LDN Noise; Deanna Dellacioppa; Taylor Parks; Ryan S. Jhun	3:22
2.	"Huff n Puff"	Kenzie	Alex G; Anne Preven; Will Gray; Jaden Michaels	Alex G; Anne Preven; Will Gray; Jaden Michaels	3:01
3.	"Campfire"	Jo Yoon-kyung	Greg Bonnick; Hayden Chapman; Taylor Parks; Denzil "DR" Remedios; Ryan S. Jhun	LDN Noise; Taylor Parks; Denzil "DR" Remedios; Ryan S. Jhun	3:16
4.	"Red Dress"	Jo Yoon-kyung	Greg Bonnick; Hayden Chapman; Nermin Harambašić; Rodnae "Chikk" Bell; Jinbyjin; Charite Viken; Ryan S. Jhun	LDN Noise; Nermin Harambašić; Rodnae "Chikk" Bell; Jinbyjin; Charite Viken; Ryan S. Jhun	3:02
5.	"Oh Boy"	Ku Tae-woo	Herbie Crichlow; Lauren Dyson; Jinbyjin; Greg Bonnick; Hayden Chapman	Herbie Crichlow; Lauren Dyson; Jinbyjin; LDN Noise	3:08
6.	"Lady's Room"	Kenzie	Kenzie; Daniel "Obi" Klein; Oliver McEwan; Ylva Dimberg	Kenzie; Daniel "Obi" Klein; Oliver McEwan; Ylva Dimberg	3:15
7.	"Time Slip"	Misfit	Daniel "Obi" Klein; Johannes "Josh" Jørgensen; Charli Taft; Jinbo	Daniel "Obi" Klein; Johannes "Josh" Jørgensen; Charli Taft; Jinbo	3:39
8.	"Don't U Wait No More"	100% Lyricism	Dwayne Abernathy Jr.; Taylor Parks; Ryan S. Jhun	Dem Jointz	2:51
9.	"Day 1"	Hwang Hyun (MonoTree)	Hwang Hyun (MonoTree)	Hwang Hyun (MonoTree)	3:26
10.	"Cool World"	Im Seo-hyun	Daniel "Obi" Klein; Marcus Winther-John; Andy Love	Daniel "Obi" Klein; Marcus Winther-John; Andy Love	4:05
Total length:					33:13

== Charts ==
=== Weekly charts ===
Chart (2015)	Peak position
Japanese Albums (Oricon)	47
South Korean Albums (Gaon)	1
US Billboard Heatseekers Albums	24
US Billboard World Albums	1

=== Monthly charts ===
Chart (2015)	Peak position
South Korean Albums (Gaon)	3

=== Year-end chart ===
Chart (2015)	Position
South Korean Albums (Gaon)	53

== Sales ==
Chart	Sales
South Korea (Gaon)	109,573
Japan (Oricon)	4,478
United States (Billboard)	3,000

== Release history ==
Region	Date	Format	Label
Various	September 9, 2015	Digital download	SM Entertainment
South Korea	September 9, 2015	CD, digital download	SM Entertainment, KT Music
