= Automatic (Red Velvet song) =

Single by Red Velvet

from the EP Ice Cream Cake
- Language: Korean
- Released: March 14, 2015
- Studio: SM Blue Ocean
- Genre: Urban; R&B
- Length: 3:30
- Label: SM; KT
- Composers: Daniel Klein; Charlotte Taft
- Lyricist: Choi So-young

Red Velvet singles chronology
"Be Natural" (2014)	"Automatic" (2015)	"Ice Cream Cake" (2015)

Music video
- "Automatic" on YouTube

"Automatic" is a song recorded by South Korean girl group Red Velvet for their debut extended play (EP), Ice Cream Cake (2015). Composed and produced by Daniel "Obi" Klein and Charlotte Taft with Korean lyrics adapted by Choi So-young, the R&B and urban song was released as the group's first single from the EP on March 14, 2015, by SM Entertainment. It marked their first release as a quintet since the addition of member Yeri. The song's lyrics tells about unraveling the feeling of attraction to the other person.

Upon its release, the song received mixed reviews from music critics due to its sultry and minimal production. Some were unsure of what to expect from Red Velvet, as it was still unknown what concept the group has. Commercially, the song charted moderately on both the Gaon Digital Chart and US Billboard World Digital Song Sales, peaking at number thirty-two and number nine, respectively. An accompanying music video was released on March 14, 2015, with a set in composition of different spaces arranged like a human memory. The song has been performed on M Countdown, Music Bank, and Inkigayo.

== Background and release ==
Prior to their official comeback announcement, Red Velvet was spotted filming in a desert outdoors in the city of Palmdale, California, for a music video with a believed SM Rookies member (which was eventually revealed as their filming location for their single "Ice Cream Cake"). On March 11, 2015, SM Entertainment officially introduced Yeri as a new member of Red Velvet through a video, along with image teasers of her, and members Irene and Joy as they will make a comeback as a five-member group. On the same day, the label revealed the title of the group's first album to be Ice Cream Cake, which was set to be released on March 18, 2015. The song was released digitally along with the EP on March 17.

== Writing and composition ==
"Automatic"
"Automatic" is an urban genre song that is noted for synthesizer tone and simple chords, to which it lyrically unravels the feelings of attraction to the other person.

"Automatic" was composed by Daniel "Obi" Klein and Charlotte Taft, who would later produce several songs for Red Velvet, while the Korean lyrics were written by Choi So-young. In an interview with MACG Magazine, Taft revealed that she met Klein at a songwriting camp in Copenhagen, Denmark. The two songwriters then wrote a track called "Lips" and made it to the first cut with Girls' Generation, and Taft was later invited to take part in songwriting camps at SM Studios in Seoul, South Korea. Taft said that she had a really memorable time writing "Automatic"; she revealed that the song was written in her first trip to Korea. Additionally, she told that the song came together "quickly and quite effortlessly", and that she spent coming up with the lyrics and melodies for the track on a rooftop in Seoul. During a podcast, Klein revealed that what seemed like an iPhone recording of girls dancing to Janet Jackson's "Got 'til It's Gone" (1997) was shown to him. He told that he was asked to make a song from the shown video and agreed to do so. However, Klein said that he needed the same BPM for the song in order to fit with the dance tempo.

Musically, "Automatic" was characterized as an urban genre song. Jeff Benjamin of Billboard described the song as a "slow-burning, Janet Jackson-esque R&B jam", which represents the group's "Velvet" side. Kim Do-hyun of IZM highlighted the song as created through the experiment of "Be Natural". It is composed in the key of F minor, with a tempo of 180 beat-per-minute. The song was noted for its synthesizer tone and simple chords, without a "fancy" session. Lyrically, the song conveys a message of automatically unraveling the feeling of attraction to the other person.

== Reception ==
Following its release, "Automatic" has received mixed reviews from music critics. While Benjamin called the song "a slow-burning, Janet Jackson-esque R&B jam that positions them as sultry sirens", Kim cited the track as a song that stand at both extremes of "innocence and sexy". In addition to the review of follow-up single "Ice Cream Cake", Jakob Dorof of Spin magazine praised the track as "a recent winner" for both Red Velvet and SM Entertainment. Park Soo-jung from Ten Asia praised Red Velvet's tone and restrained "sensual" vocals for standing out on the song. Cho Ji-hwan of Weiv noted the song for succeeding in producing its own "stickiness". On another album review, while Yoo Je-sang of Idology called the song as "a move to take a stable position", further explaining that it certainly reminds of past idols such as S.E.S., MRJ described the song as "a little disappointing", clarifying that he didn't know what to expect from Red Velvet this time. Jung Byung-wook of Y-Magazine described the song as "one of the risk factors that obscures one's own color", adding that it is still unknown whether the group can have a "steady concept" or has potential as a "more advanced narrative".

Jacques Peterson of Idolator ranked "Automatic" 22nd on "The 25 Best K-Pop Songs of 2015" list, calling the song a stand-out due to its "minimalist R&B beat" and "melancholy sensuality". The song also landed on Billboard's "The 25 Best Red Velvet Songs: Critic's Picks" list at number nine, and the staff highlighted it for being one of their "smoothest cuts to date".

On the 13th week of March 2015, "Automatic" debuted and peaked at number 32 on South Korea's Gaon Digital Chart. The song has since reached total sales of 71,844 digital units in South Korea, as of March 2015. Elsewhere, the song debuted and peaked at number nine on the US Billboard World Digital Song Sales chart, making it Red Velvet's fourth entry and at the time, their lowest peak position on the chart. The ranking of the group's lowest peak was later surpassed by their 2017 SM Station single "Rebirth", which debuted and peaked at number 25 on the World Digital Song Sales chart.

== Music video ==
=== Background ===
The music video is directed with a symmetrical narrative that emphasizes a "drowsy yet feminist" concept.

On March 14, 2015, the music video for "Automatic" was uploaded on both SM Town's YouTube channel and Red Velvet's website. The visual for the song was directed by Shin Hee-won, standing as the first visual he worked on for SM, and he later directed the music videos for Red Velvet's singles "One of These Nights" (2016), "Russian Roulette" (2016), and "Rookie" (2017). In an interview with K-Popped, group member Seulgi revealed that while filming for the music video, the most fun part for her was the hardness of syncing lips with "Automatic", as the song was really fast.

=== Synopsis and reception ===
The music video is set in a composition of different spaces arranged like a human memory. In order to project the lyrics "I want to continue to stay in your space together" and express that it stays in the memory without departing it, the video is directed with a symmetrical narrative. In addition, it has also redesigned spaces and scenes with unique angles and camera walking. Through the narrative, a differentiated visual beauty is provided that emphasizes a "drowsy yet feminist" concept, "amplifying" curiosity about the opposite double title track. All five members are "showcasing sensual choreography at a dimly lit dinner table". The visual became the sixth-most viewed K-pop music video worldwide and the fourth-most viewed in the United States by March 2015.

== Live performances ==
Red Velvet started the promotion for "Automatic" dressed in black and white costumes on M Countdown, where they also performed "Ice Cream Cake". For the performance, choreography by SM performance director Shim Jae-won was commissioned with moves that emphasized fascination and femininity. The choreography included "detailed expressions", such as the movement of turning the wrists crossed with fingers made of the letter "A", taken from the song title. It also featured the movement of the members gathering in a circle and matching the steps with their feet to the lyrics of "I'm putting my feet together". As part of Ice Cream Cake's promotions, the song was performed live during the first promotion week on both Music Bank and Inkigayo. On April 6, 2015, Red Velvet performed the track on Kim Shin-young's Hope Song at Noon. The song was also performed during Red Velvet's first concert Red Room in August 2017.

== Credits and personnel ==
Credits adapted from the liner notes of Ice Cream Cake.

Studio

- Recorded at SM Blue Ocean Studio
- Additional vocal editing at SM Big Shot Studio
- Mixed at SM Yellow Tail Studio
- Mastered at Sonic Korea

Personnel

- SM Entertainment – executive producer
- Red Velvet (Irene, Seulgi, Wendy, Joy, Yeri) – vocals, background vocals
- Choi So-young – Korean songwriting
- Daniel Klein – composition, arrangement
- Charlotte Taft – composition, arrangement
- Jeon Seung-woo – vocal directing, background vocals
- Kim Chul-soon – recording
- Lee Min-kyu – recording, additional vocal editing
- Jiyoung Shin – additional vocal editing
- Koo Jong-pil – mixing
- Jeon Hoon – mastering
- Shin Soo-min – mastering assistant

== Charts ==
=== Weekly charts ===
Weekly chart performance for "Automatic"
Chart (2015)	Peak position
South Korea (Gaon)	32
US World Digital Song Sales (Billboard)	9

=== Monthly charts ===
Monthly chart performance for "Automatic"
Chart (March 2015)	Position
South Korea (Gaon)	94

== Release history ==
Release dates and formats for "Automatic"
Region	Date	Format(s)	Label(s)	Ref.
Various	March 17, 2015	Digital download; streaming	SM Entertainment; KT Music	
