= List of Show! Music Core Chart winners (2015) =

Show! Music Core Chart winners (2015)

Highlights
- Song with most wins: "Call Me Baby" by Exo (4)
- Artist(s) with most wins: Exo (7)
- Song with highest score: "Lion Heart" by Girls' Generation (9,699)

The Show! Music Core Chart is a record chart on the South Korean MBC television music program Show! Music Core. Every week, the show awards the best-performing single on the chart in the country during its live broadcast. This is a list of 2015 winners.

== Chart history ==
Key
	Highest score in 2015
—	No show was held

Date	Artist	Song	Points	Ref.
January 3	Apink	"Luv"	8,207	
January 10	Apink	"Luv"	7,745	
January 17	Jonghyun	"Déjà-Boo"	8,202	
January 24	Jonghyun	"Déjà-Boo"	7,082	
January 31	Davichi	"Cry Again"	5,716	
February 7	Infinite H	"Pretty"	9,049	
February 14	Zion.T & Crush	"Just"	6,112	
February 21	4Minute	"Crazy"	7,278	
February 28	Niel	"Love Killer"	6,462	
March 7	VIXX	"Love Equation"	9,094	
March 14	Shinhwa	"Sniper"	7,630	
March 21	Shinhwa	"Sniper"	8,186	
March 28	No Show			
April 4	Red Velvet	"Ice Cream Cake"	7,199	
April 11	Exo	"Call Me Baby"	8,833	
April 18	Exo	"Call Me Baby"	9,063	
April 25	Exo	"Call Me Baby"	7,538	
May 2	Exo	"Call Me Baby"	8,738	
May 9	Big Bang	"Loser"	8,954	
May 16	Big Bang	"Loser"	7,961	
May 23	Kim Sung Kyu	"The Answer"	8,135	
May 30	No Show			
June 6	Shinee	"View"	9,251	
June 13	Exo	"Love Me Right"	9,666	
June 20	Exo	"Love Me Right"	9,562	
June 27	Exo	"Love Me Right"	7,096	
July 4	AOA	"Heart Attack"	7,376	
July 11	Big Bang	"Sober"	6,563	
July 18	Girls' Generation	"Party"	9,660	
July 25	Infinite	"Bad"	8,363	
August 1	No Chart: Ulsan Summer Festival			
August 8	Beast	"YeY"	8,473	
August 15	Big Bang	"Let's Not Fall in Love"	7,524	
August 22	Big Bang	"Let's Not Fall in Love"	9,472	
August 29	Girls' Generation	"Lion Heart"	8,068	
September 5	No Chart			
September 12	No Chart			
September 19	Girls' Generation	"Lion Heart"	9,699	
September 26	iKon	"My Type"	8,277	
October 3	Park Kyung	"Ordinary Love"	6,693	
October 10	No Show			
October 17	No Chart			
October 24	Taeyeon	"I"	9,174	
October 31	No Show: 2015 KBO Pro Baseball Korean Series			
November 7	No Chart			
November 14	IU	"Twenty-Three"	7,503	

(Starting from November 21, 2015, the ranking system was abolished but was revived later on April 22, 2017)
