= Ice Cream Cake (EP) =

- Digital and Ice Cream Cake version cover

EP by Red Velvet
- Released: March 17, 2015
- Recorded: 2014–2015
- Studios: SM Studio (Seoul, South Korea)
- Genres: Electropop; R&B
- Length: 21:28
- Languages: Korean; English
- Labels: SM; Dreamus
- Producers: Hayley Aitken; Trinity Music; Daniel "Obi" Klein; Charli Taft; Kenzie; Teddy Riley; Cha Cha Malone; MonoTree

Red Velvet chronology
Ice Cream Cake (2015)	The Red (2015)

Singles from Ice Cream Cake
- 1. "Automatic" Released: March 14, 2015; 2. "Ice Cream Cake" Released: March 16, 2015

Ice Cream Cake is the debut Korean extended play by the South Korean girl group Red Velvet. It was released digitally on March 17, 2015, and physically on March 18 by SM Entertainment and distributed by Dreamus, marking the group's first proper release since their initial debut in August 2014 and their first release as a quintet since the addition of the group's fifth member Yeri. The extended play was released in two physical versions, named after the two singles and contained six tracks which introduced both the group's "Red" and "Velvet" sonic concept. The duality was further demonstrated by its two singles (marketed as double title tracks), "Automatic" and "Ice Cream Cake", with the latter becoming the group's breakthrough commercial success. S.M. founder Lee Soo-man served as the EP's executive producer, with Hayley Aitken, Trinity Music, Daniel "Obi" Klein, Charli Taft, Jam Factory, Kenzie, Teddy Riley, Cha Cha Malone, MonoTree and others contributed lyrics and production.

Upon its release, Ice Cream Cake received positive reviews from music critics for its "impressive effort" of establishing the two sides of their musical identity. The EP also attained commercial success, becoming Red Velvet's first chart-topper on the Gaon Album Chart in South Korea and number two on the Billboard World Albums Chart for the first time, while peaking at number twenty-four on Billboard's Heatseekers Albums chart. It has since sold a cumulative sales of over 94,000 copies.

== Background and release ==
Following the end of "Be Natural" promotion in late October 2014, it was announced that Red Velvet would return with an extended play, marking their first proper release since the group's debut in last August. In February 2015, Red Velvet was spotted filming in a desert just outside of Palmdale, California with then SM Rookies-member Yeri, with the then-rumored song title to be "Blonde Girl", when they were actually filming the music video for "Ice Cream Cake". Yeri was then introduced by S.M. Entertainment as the fifth member of Red Velvet through two videos uploaded on the label's YouTube channel on March 11 and March 12, which contained audio previews of then-unknown album track "Somethin Kinda Crazy". On the same day, they revealed the title of the group's first EP, Ice Cream Cake. On March 14, the music video for "Automatic" was released days prior to the EP's release, with title track "Ice Cream Cake" followed suit on March 16. SM Entertainment confirmed that the group would be promoting both "Ice Cream Cake" and "Automatic". The EP was released in two versions, Ice Cream Cake and Automatic. While there are no changes in the track list, the Automatic version has an alternative cover which features the original artwork in black and white, along with the design of the physical disc and the photo book inside is different from the other version.

== Composition ==
=== Concept ===
Not only does the group's name "Red Velvet" represent their two different images, it also represents the duality sonic concept that the group was focusing on since their debut in 2014. While the "Red" concept shows the group's "sweet, bubblegum side", the "Velvet" concept highlights the group as "sultry sirens" with "slow-burning, Janet Jackson-esque R&B jam". Ice Cream Cake marks the first release from Red Velvet to contain both "Red" and "Velvet" compositions, which was eventually followed by two different releases that focused solely on a single sonic concept: The Red in September 2015 and The Velvet in March 2016.

=== Songs ===
"Ice Cream Cake"
"Ice Cream Cake" is a dance-rock song with influences of bubblegum pop and drum and bass. The song represents the "Red" sonic concept of the group.

The extended play starts with the same-name track "Ice Cream Cake", a "punchy, sugary pop confection" that consists elements from dance-rock, bubblegum-pop and drum and bass. Produced by Hayley Aitken and producing team Trinity Music, the song original title was "Ice Cream Truck" before the lyrics was rewritten in Korean by songwriter Jo Yoon-kyung and Kim Dong-hyun. In addition, it also features "haunted" harmony which can be heard during the intro of the song, while being accompanied by the sound of a music box. The lyrics tell the excitement of a girl being attracted to her boyfriend, using "ice cream cake" as a metaphor to the girl's feelings. Along with the electro-pop "Stupid Cupid" and the bright, poppy "Take It Slow", the three tracks represent the "Red" concept, with "Stupid Cupid" offers a different "aura" through the electric riffs, and "Take It Slow" highlights the group's harmonization and soft vocals that recalls "the perfection" from fellow labelmate Girls' Generation-TTS.

"Automatic"
"Automatic" is a contemporary R&B song with influence from neo soul. The song represents the "Velvet" sonic concept of the group.

In contrast, the second track "Automatic" is "a surely implemented R&B track" with influence from neo soul, thus represents the "Velvet" sonic concept. Produced by Daniel "Obi" Klein and British singer-songwriter Charli Taft, the song was the first work from the duo with Red Velvet (who would later participate in the group's upcoming releases). Lyrically, the song tells how "natural" and "automatic" the senses and feelings of a girl come just by the touch of her lover, with the opening monologue "How do you like this beat?/Natural and automatic for you." Charli Taft also co-produced the third track "Something Kinda Crazy", a modern-R&B track with synth-pop influence that sings about the starstruck feelings of a girl when she falls in a relationship. The lyrics was written by songwriter Kenzie, with American producer Teddy Riley joined in the production. The closing track "Candy" is a "smoothing, popping" R&B track that sings about the wishes of a long-lasting relationship. These three tracks eventually represent the group's "Velvet" concept, portraying the group's "sultry" images and music.

== Promotion ==
SM Entertainment announced a program where the group would promote their new EP, called Ice Cream TV. The group performed the songs live on the show, which was streamed through Naver Music and was hosted by Shinee's Minho. Besides their live performances, the group also talked about the new album and their 'comeback'.

The group started promoting their singles "Automatic" and "Ice Cream Cake" on music shows on March 19. They first performed the songs on Mnet's M Countdown, followed by performances on KBS' Music Bank on March 20 and SBS' Inkigayo on March 22. They returned to Music Bank a week later and won their first music show trophy since their official debut. They had their first overseas performance of "Ice Cream Cake" and their first as a 5-member group in an SM Town concert held in Taiwan. The group has also promoted and performed songs from the album in the Philippines for the Best of the Best K-pop Concert on April 12, a concert which also featured labelmates Super Junior and Girls' Generation as well as Cube boy band BTOB. The group also had its first promotions in the United States at KCON on August 2 at the Staples Center in downtown Los Angeles. The group participated in a fan engagement session at the Los Angeles Convention Center and performed songs "Ice Cream Cake", "Somethin' Kinda Crazy", and "Happiness" during the concert.

== Reception ==
Professional ratings
Review scores
Source	Rating
IZM	3.5/5 stars
Seoulbeats	3.75/5 stars

Upon its initial release, Ice Cream Cake received positive reviews from most music critics for showcasing the duality sonic concept of the group. Jakob Dorof of pop music magazine Spin described the track "Ice Cream Cake" as "a treat as unexpected as it is unpredictable [...] packs a punch, but goes down smooth over time" and deemed it "the SM label's specialty: bubblegum pop that deeply rewards repeat rotations." Billboard's Jeff Benjamin called the album "an impressive effort for such a young group" and praised its ability to personify the group's dual-sided musical identity through the singles "Ice Cream Cake" and "Automatic." He explained: "The former track is a punchy, sugary pop confection that [...] seems to represent the outfit's sweet bubblegum side; their "Red" side if you will. While the latter is a slow-burning, Janet Jackson-esque R&B jam that [...] positions them as sultry sirens; their "Velvet" side." In a positive review for the EP, writer Kim Do-hyun of IZM complemented the strong R&B influence in the release, while noting that the release is "an independent statement" for the group, choosing the two songs "Something Kinda Crazy" and "Take It Slow" to be the highlights of the EP. Another review from Seoulbeats described the EP as "an earnestly sweet album that shows the wide range of talent the ladies of Red Velvet possess." The two singles would later appear in the top 25 Red Velvet songs by Billboard, with "Automatic" at number nine and "Ice Cream Cake" at number eighteen.

== Commercial performance ==
On the week of March 15, 2015, Ice Cream Cake debuted and spent one week at number one on the weekly Gaon Album Chart, giving the group their first chart-topping title. All six songs from the album eventually charted in the same week on Gaon Singles Chart. The album went on to become the best selling album by a girl group in South Korea on the Hanteo Chart for the first half of 2015. With a total of 48,815 copies sold in 2015, the extended play was the 50th best-selling release on the 2015's Gaon Year-End Album Chart, and later achieved a cumulative sales of over 88,000 copies as of September 2018. It also debuted at number two on Billboard's World Albums Chart, becoming their first charting entry. The album also peaked at 25 on Billboard's Top Heatseekers on April 4, 2015. The album is also the group's first appearance on the Japan's Oricon Albums Chart, peaking at number 76 for one week.

== Track listing ==
Ice Cream Cake track listing
No.	Title	Lyrics	Music	Arrangement	Length
1.	"Ice Cream Cake"	Jo Yoon-kyung; Kim Dong-hyun	Hayley Aitken; Sebastian Lundberg (Trinity Music); Fredrik Häggstam (Trinity Music); Johan Gustafsson (Trinity Music)	Hayley Aitken; Trinity Music	3:11
2.	"Automatic"	Choi So-young	Daniel "Obi" Klein; Charli Taft	Daniel "Obi" Klein; Charli Taft	3:30
3.	"Somethin Kinda Crazy"	Kenzie	Kenzie; Teddy Riley (Red Rocket); Dominique "DOM" Rodriguez (Red Rocket); Lee Hyun-seung (Red Rocket); Charli Taft	Kenzie; Red Rocket; Charli Taft	3:19
4.	"Stupid Cupid"	Seong Hyun-bin (Doppio (Devine Channel))	Andrew Choi; Hayley Aitken; Joseph "220" Park (Iconic Sounds); Cha Cha Malone (Iconic Sounds)	Andrew Choi; Hayley Aitken; Iconic Sounds	3:29
5.	"Take It Slow"	G-High (MonoTree); Lee Joo-hyoung (MonoTree)	G-High (MonoTree); Lee Joo-hyoung (MonoTree)	MonoTree	3:31
6.	"Candy" (사탕; Satang)	Hong Ji-yoo	Claire Rodrigues Lee (Hookline & Singer Music); Kevin Charge (TG Publishing)	Score	4:22
Total length:					21:28

== Personnel ==
Credits are from the album liner notes.

- S.M. Entertainment Co., Ltd. – executive producer
- Lee Soo-man – producer
- Kim Cheol-soon – recording engineer
- Jeong Ui-seok – recording engineer
- Lee Min-kyu – recording engineer
- Kim Hyeon-gon – recording engineer
- Oh Seong-goon – recording engineer
- Jeong Gi-hong – recording engineer
- Jeong Eun-kyeong – recording engineer
- G-high – recording engineer
- Nam Goong-jin – mixing engineer
- Goo Jong-pil – mixing engineer
- Kim Cheol-soon – mixing engineer
- Jeong Ui-seok – mixing engineer
- Jeon-hoon – mastering engineer
- Shin Soo-min – assistant mastering engineer
- Steven Myungkyu Lee – English supervision
- Min Hui-jin – creative director
- Shin Hui-won – music video director ("Automatic")
- Kim Seong-ook – music video director ("Ice Cream Cake")
- Min Hui-jin – design
- Jo Woo-cheol – design
- Kim Ye-min – design
- Madame Lolina – illustration
- Choi Min-hye – stylist
- Kim Joo-hee – make-up artist ("Automatic")
- Shin Gyeong-mi – make-up artist ("Automatic")
- Kim Joo-hee – make-up artist ("Ice Cream Cake")
- Lee Ji-hyeon – hair stylist ("Automatic")
- Jeong Seon-i – hair stylist ("Ice Cream Cake")
- Min Hui-jin – photography
- Kim Ye-min – photography assistant
- Young-min Kim – executive supervisor

== Charts ==
=== Weekly charts ===
Chart (2015)	Peak position
Japan Oricon Albums Chart	76
South Korean Albums (Gaon)	1
US Billboard World Albums	2
US Billboard Top Heatseekers	24

=== Monthly charts ===
Chart (2015)	Peak position
South Korean Albums (Gaon)	8

=== Year-End charts ===
Chart (2015)	Peak position
South Korean Albums (Gaon)	50

== Sales ==
Chart	Amount
Gaon physical sales	88,271+
Oricon physical sales	2,796+
Billboard physical sales	3,000+

== Release history ==
Region	Date	Format	Label
Various	March 17, 2015	Digital download	SM Entertainment
South Korea	March 17, 2015	Digital download	SM Entertainment
South Korea	March 18, 2015	CD	SM Entertainment, KT Music
