= Ice Cream Cake (song) =

2015 single by Red Velvet

Single by Red Velvet

from the album Ice Cream Cake
- Language: Korean
- Released: March 16, 2015
- Studio: In Grid (Seoul); SM Blue Ocean (Seoul)
- Genre: Drum and bass; dance-rock
- Length: 3:11
- Label: SM; KT
- Composers: Hayley Aitken; Sebastian Lundberg; Fredrik Häggstam; Johan Gustafsson
- Lyricists: Jo Yoon-kyung; Kim Dong-hyun

Red Velvet singles chronology
| "Automatic" (2015) | "Ice Cream Cake" (2015) | "Dumb Dumb" (2015) |

Music video
- "Ice Cream Cake" on YouTube

"Ice Cream Cake" is a song recorded by South Korean girl group Red Velvet for their debut extended play Ice Cream Cake (2015). Primarily a dance-rock track with influences from drum and bass, the song was written by lyricist Jo Yoon-kyung, Kim Dong-hyun, Fredrik Häggstam, Hayley Aitken, Johan Gustafsson and Sebastian Lundberg, while production and arrangement were handled by Hayley Aitken and Trinity Music. Following the release of "Automatic", it was released as the group's second single (marketed as the "main" title track) from the extended play on March 16, 2015, by SM Entertainment, along with an accompanying music video. With its parental release, the group showcased their dual sonic concept in one album for the first time as "Ice Cream Cake" was promoted as the "Red" single, in contrast to "Automatic" which was promoted as its "Velvet" single.

The song has since received critical acclaim from music critics, calling it an "addictive" and "unpredictable" pop infection, and showcased the group's potential. It also attained commercial success, becoming the group's breakthrough and second top-five hit, peaking at number four on Gaon Digital Chart and number three on Billboard's World Digital Songs chart.

== Background and release ==
After wrapping up promotions for "Be Natural" in late October 2014, it was announced that Red Velvet would return with an extended play, marking their first proper release since the group's debut in August 2014. Prior to the official comeback announcement, Red Velvet was spotted filming in a desert just outside of Palmdale, California for a music video in February 2015 with then SM Rookies member Yeri, with the then-rumored song title to be "Blonde Girl". On March 11, 2015, S.M. Entertainment officially introduced Yeri as a new member of Red Velvet through a video uploaded on their YouTube channel, along with image teasers from member Irene and Joy. On the same day, they revealed the title of the group's first album to be Ice Cream Cake, which would be released on March 18, 2015. The official video for "Ice Cream Cake" was then uploaded on the official SMTOWN channel on March 16, 2015 along with the single.

== Composition ==
"Ice Cream Cake" was produced by Hayley Aitken and producing team Trinity Music, which consists of Sebastian Lundberg, Fredrik Haggstam and Johan Gustafson. In December 2012, a 21-second demo version of the song was first spotted during an episode of Swedish TV show Kobra, where Lundberg, Haggstam and Gustafson can be seen processing the demo version which was sung in English. After being purchased by S.M. Entertainment, the song's lyrics was rewritten in Korean by songwriter Jo Yoon-kyung and Kim Dong-hyun, with the former who had been writing for Red Velvet's labelmates previously, and the song title changed from its original name of "Ice Cream Truck."

"Ice Cream Cake"
"Ice Cream Cake" is a dance-rock song with influences of bubblegum pop.

Musically, the song is primarily a dance-rock track with influence from bubblegum pop and drum and bass, which represents the group's "Red" sonic characters. It was composed in the key of A major with a tempo of 172 beat-per-minute. In addition, it also features "haunted" harmony which can be heard during the intro of the song, while being accompanied by the sound of a music box. The lyrics tell the excitement of a girl being attracted to her boyfriend, using "ice cream cake" as a metaphor to the girl's feelings. Two different remix versions of the song were also used for the group's promotion, with the first one having an additional dance break section (performed on KBS Music Bank Half-Year Special) and the second one having a longer intro and another dance break section towards the end of the song, while omitting the second verse and chorus of the original version (performed on 2015 MBC Music Festival).

== Music video ==
The music video for "Ice Cream Cake" was filmed around February 2015 at the Four Aces Movie Ranch located in Palmdale, California. It was directed by director Woogie Kim, who had previously directed Red Velvet's debut single "Happiness". Setting in an abandoned motel, the music video features all five members dancing and singing to the song while showing the girls eating ice cream and drinking iced coffee in colorful outfits in the desert. At some scenes, the group can be seen driving along the road while being chased after by a big pink ball. The song's choreography was created by choreographer Kyle Hanagami, who had previously choreographed for "Be Natural" in 2014. The video was uploaded on the official SMTOWN channel on March 16, 2015, and became the most viewed K-pop video in both America and the world for the month of March. It has since received more 100 million views, making it their sixth most watched music video.

== Live performances ==
Promotion of the song was started with Ice Cream TV on March 17, 2015, where the group promoted their debut extended play by performing the songs live in the show, which was streamed through Naver Music and was hosted by SHINee's Minho. Two days after the digital release, they had their first live performance of "Ice Cream Cake" on M! Countdown, followed by performances on Music Bank on March 20 and Inkigayo on March 22, where they also performed a shortened version of "Automatic". A week later, the group returned to Music Bank and won their first music show trophy since their official debut. They then continued to promote the song within the first half of 2015 on music shows and radio talk shows, before ending with a year-end performance at the fifth Gaon Chart Music Awards on February 17, 2016, where they received the Hot Performance of the Year award. The song was part of the set list for Red Velvet's first concert Red Room in August 2017, where a remix version was performed instead of the original version.

In addition to the domestic promotion, Red Velvet had their first overseas performance of "Ice Cream Cake" and their first as a 5-member group in an SMTOWN concert held in Taiwan. The group then promoted and performed songs from the album in the Philippines for the Best of the Best K-pop Concert on April 12, a concert which also featured label mates Super Junior and Girls' Generation as well as Cube boy band BTOB, before having their first United States promotion at KCON on August 2 at the Staples Center in downtown Los Angeles.

== Critical reception ==
Upon its initial release, "Ice Cream Cake" was compared to the sound of label mate f(x) by many, and has since received critical acclaim from music critics. While Jeff Benjamin of Billboard magazine complimented the song as "a punchy, sugary pop confection", Kim Do-hyun of IZM chose it as a highlight of the EP, said the song "seemed to inherit" the sound of f(x), but "it built an identity" as "first Red Velvet". Jakob Dorof of pop music magazine Spin described the track "Ice Cream Cake" as "a treat as unexpected as it is unpredictable [...] packs a punch, but goes down smooth over time" and deemed it "the SM label's specialty: bubblegum pop that deeply rewards repeat rotations." On an individual music video review, Jesse Lent of KpopStarz said the song was "deeply arresting" and "delivers every intriguing move you could want from a shiny new pop song". Writer Chelsea from Seoulbeats applauded the song "alarmingly catchy" and "definitely an ear worm", while writer Jung Bae of Hellokpop chose the song as the Best Dance and Electronic Song of 2015 and ranked it fifth on the Song of the Year chart. The song would later appear in the top 25 Red Velvet songs by Billboard, landing at number eighteen on the list.

== Commercial performance ==
Upon its digital release, "Ice Cream Cake" achieved great success and became the group's breakthrough hit. The song debuted and peaked at number four on the Gaon Digital Chart for the week of March 15, 2015. It became the group's second top-five hit following "Happiness", which debuted and peaked at number five in 2014. Furthermore, "Ice Cream Cake" also charted at number 11 on the monthly chart of Gaon Digital Chart, for the month of March 2015. Having spent a total of 17 weeks charting within the top 100, "Ice Cream Cake" appeared at number 46 on the year-end Gaon Digital Chart. As of July 2016, the song received more than 1.3 million downloads, making it Red Velvet's second million-seller and currently their eighth best-selling hit.

Elsewhere, the song debuted at number three on the US Billboard World Digital Song, becoming their third entry and second top-five hit on the chart. As of December 2019, "Ice Cream Cake" is the group's fourth most downloaded song in the United States, having achieved a total of 23,000 downloads.

== Accolades ==
"Ice Cream Cake" won the Female Dance Award at the 2015 Melon Music Awards. It won the Best Female Dance Performance at the 2015 Mnet Asian Music Awards, and got longlisted on the UnionPay Song of the Year. It also won the Digital Bonsang on the 2016 Golden Disc Awards. The song also received six music program wins.

Awards and nominations for "Ice Cream Cake"
| Year | Award show | Category | Result | Ref. |
|---|---|---|---|---|
| 2015 | Melon Music Awards | Dance Award (Female) | Won | |
| 2015 | Mnet Asian Music Awards | Best Dance Performance – Female Group | Won | |
| 2015 | Mnet Asian Music Awards | UnionPay Song of the Year | Nominated | |
| 2016 | Golden Disc Awards | Digital Bonsang | Won | |
| 2016 | Golden Disc Awards | Digital Song of the Year | Nominated | |

Music program awards
| Program | Date | Ref. |
|---|---|---|
| Music Bank | March 27, 2015 | |
| Inkigayo | March 29, 2015 | |
| The Show | March 31, 2015 | |
| Show Champion | April 1, 2015 | |
| M Countdown | April 2, 2015 | |
| Show! Music Core | April 4, 2015 | |

== Credits and personnel ==
Credits adapted from the liner notes of Ice Cream Cake.

Studio

- Recorded at SM Blue Ocean Studio
- Recorded at In Grid Studio
- Additional vocal editing at SM Big Shot Studio
- Mixed at SM Concert Hall Studio
- Mastered at Sonic Korea

Personnel

- Red Velvet (Irene, Seulgi, Wendy, Joy, Yeri) – vocals, background vocals
- Jo Yoon-kyung – lyrics
- Kim Dong-hyun – lyrics
- Hayley Aitken – composition, arrangement, background vocals
- Sebastian Lundberg – composition, arrangement
- Fredrik Häggstam – composition, arrangement
- Johan Gustafson – composition, arrangement
- Kenzie – vocal directing
- Kim Chul-soon – recording
- Lee Min-kyu – recording, additional vocal editing
- Jeong Eun-kyung – recording
- Jiyoung Shin – additional vocal editing
- Nam Koong-jin – mixing
- Jeon Hoon – mastering
- Shin Soo-min – mastering assistant

== Charts ==
=== Weekly charts ===
Weekly chart performance
| Chart (2015) | Peak position |
|---|---|
| South Korea (Gaon) | 4 |
| US World Digital Songs (Billboard) | 3 |

=== Monthly charts ===
Monthly chart performance
| Chart (March 2015) | Position |
|---|---|
| South Korea (Gaon) | 11 |

=== Year-end charts ===
2015 year-end charts
| Chart (2015) | Position |
|---|---|
| South Korea (Gaon) | 46 |

== Release history ==
Release dates and formats for "Ice Cream Cake"
| Region | Date | Format(s) | Label(s) | Ref. |
|---|---|---|---|---|
| Various | March 17, 2015 | Digital download; streaming | SM Entertainment; KT Music | |

== See also ==
- List of Inkigayo Chart winners (2015)
- List of M Countdown Chart winners (2015)
