= List of M Countdown Chart winners (2015) =

Winners of South Korean music program M Countdown

M Countdown Chart winners (2015)

The M Countdown Chart is a record chart on the South Korean Mnet television music program M Countdown. Every week, the show awards the best-performing single on the chart in the country during its live broadcast.

In 2015, 30 singles ranked number one on the chart and 25 music acts were awarded first-place trophies. Four songs collected trophies for three weeks and achieved a triple crown: "Sniper" by Shinhwa, "Call Me Baby" by Exo, "Lion Heart" by Girls' Generation and "I" by Taeyeon. No release for the year earned a perfect score, but "Lion Heart" acquired the highest point total on the September 3 broadcast with a score of 10,988.

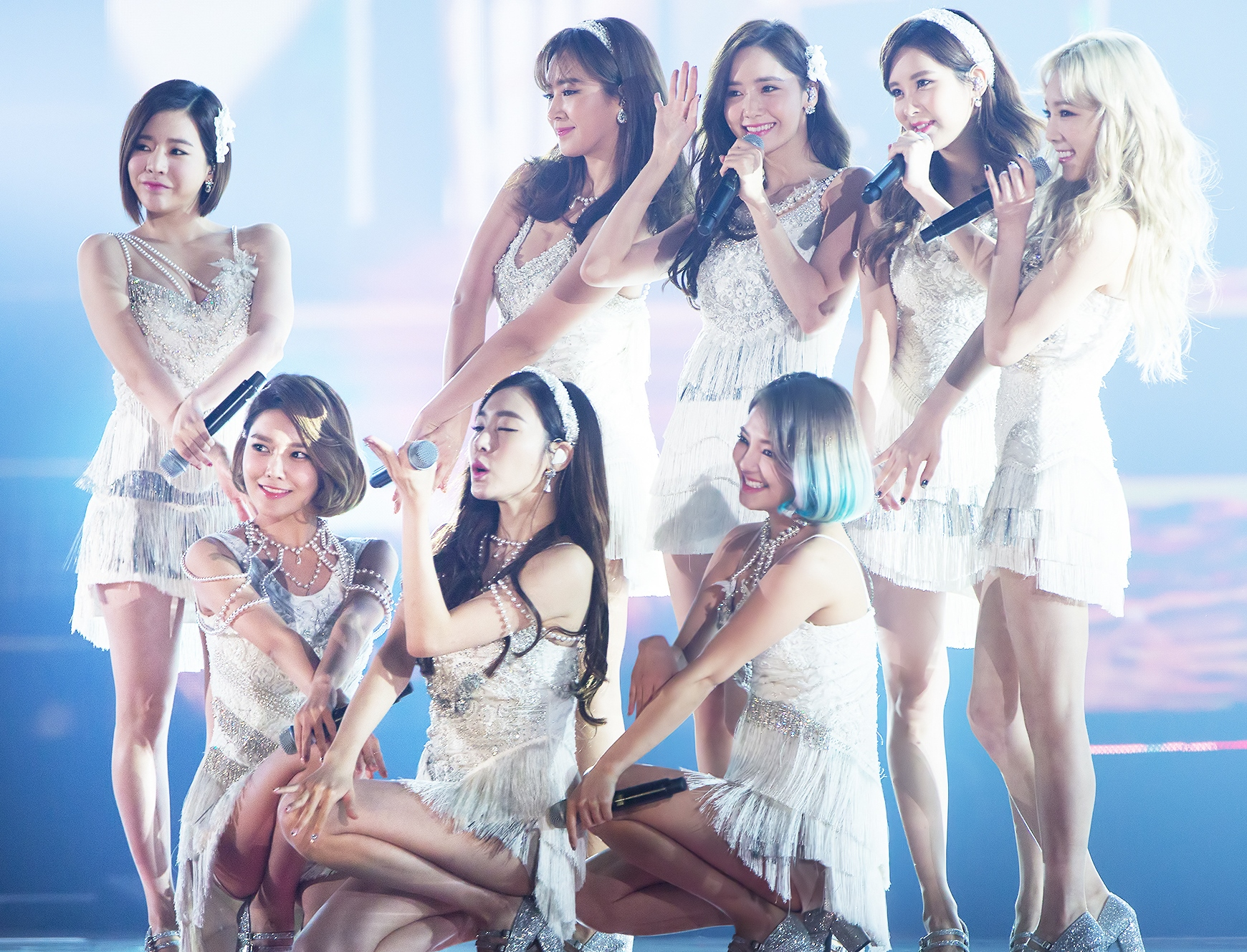
"Lion Heart" by Girls' Generation (above) was the highest-scoring song on M Countdown for 2015. It won first place on episode 441 with a total of 10,988 points and also earned a triple crown.

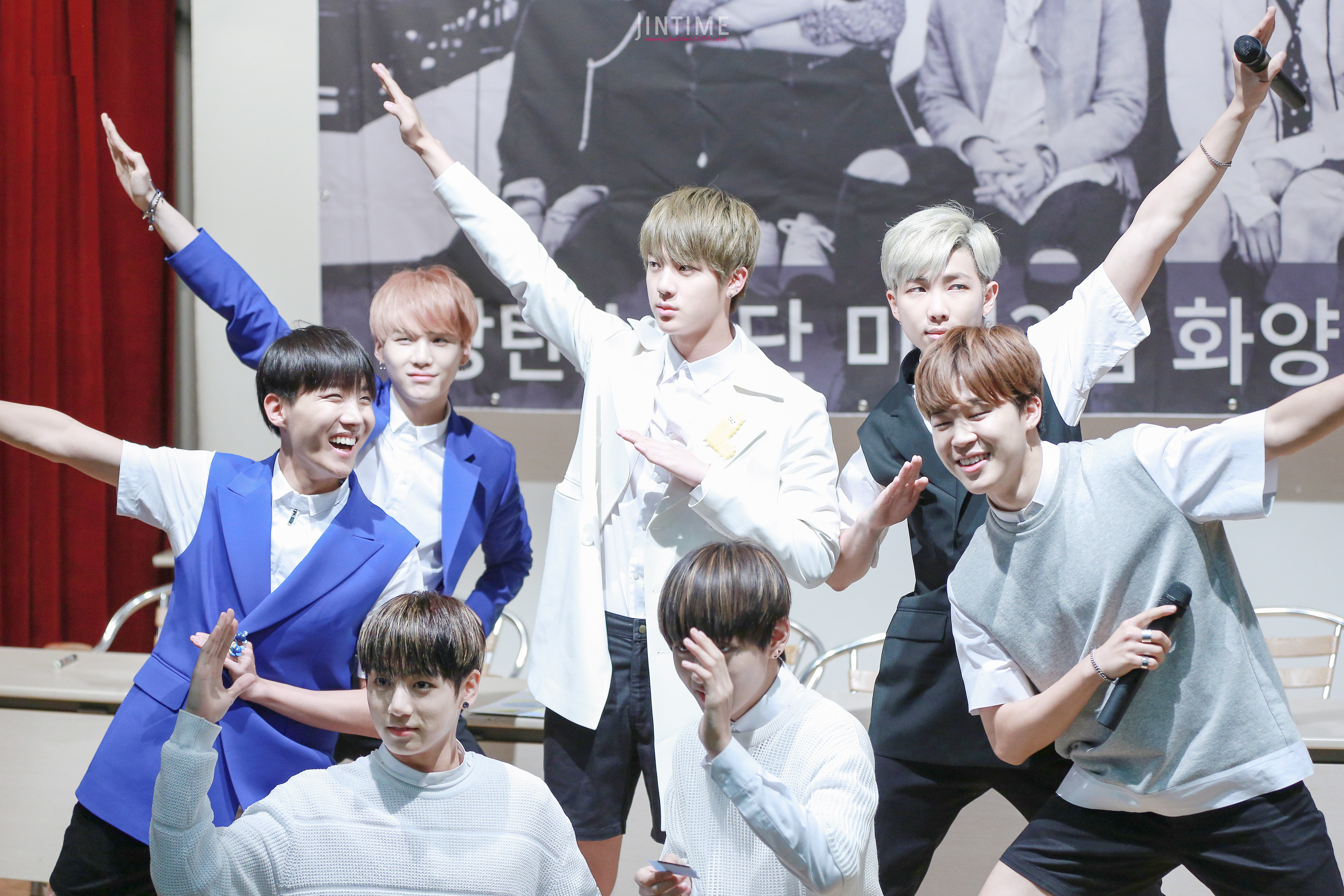
BTS received their first M Countdown trophy for their single "I Need U" on episode 423.

== Scoring system ==
=== February 27, 2014–June 4, 2015 ===
Songs that appeared on the show from January 1–June 4 were scored based on a combination of digital single sales (50%), album sales (10%), social media performance (official YouTube music video views and SNS buzz: 10%), preference points (global fan votes and age range preference: 10%), Mnet's broadcast score (10%), and SMS votes (10%), for a total of 11,000 points.

=== June 11, 2015–April 12, 2018 ===
Mnet changed its scoring system effective the June 11 broadcast. Digital sales still accounted for 50% of a song's score, but points for album sales and social media performance were increased to 15% each. The popularity, broadcast, and voting percentages remained unchanged. No song achieved a perfect score under either system for the year.

== Chart history ==
Key
	Triple Crown
	Highest score in 2015
—	No show was held

Episode	Date	Artist	Song	Points	Ref.
—	January 1	No.1 Special			
407	January 8	EXID	"Up & Down"	—N/a	
408	January 15	EXID	"Up & Down"	—N/a	
409	January 22	Jonghyun	"Déjà-Boo"	6,995	
410	January 29	Mad Clown	"Fire"	7,409	
411	February 5	Davichi	"Cry Again"	7,238	
412	February 12	Infinite H	"Pretty"	7,209	
—	February 19	4Minute	"Crazy"	—N/a	
413	February 26	4Minute	"Crazy"	8,636	
414	March 5	VIXX	"Love Equation"	8,403	
415	March 12	Shinhwa	"Sniper"	—N/a	
416	March 19	Shinhwa	"Sniper"	7,965	
417	March 26	Shinhwa	"Sniper"	8,554	
418	April 2	Red Velvet	"Ice Cream Cake"	8,069	
419	April 9	Exo	"Call Me Baby"	7,745	
420	April 17	Exo	"Call Me Baby"	7,756	
421	April 23	KCON Japan Special Episode, winners were not announced			
422	April 30	Exo	"Call Me Baby"	7,652	
423	May 7	BTS	"I Need U"	6,876	
424	May 14	Big Bang	"Loser"	9,669	
425	May 21	Big Bang	"Loser"	8,188	
426	May 28	Shinee	"View"	9,037	
427	June 4	Shinee	"View"	9,762	
428	June 11	BigBang	"Bang Bang Bang"	9,669	
429	June 18	Exo	"Love Me Right"	9,238	
430	June 25	BigBang	"Bang Bang Bang"	9,124	
431	July 2	Sistar	"Shake It"	—N/a	
432	July 9	BigBang	"Sober"	8,487	
433	July 16	Girls' Generation	"Party"	10,654	
434	July 23	Infinite	"Bad"	8,851	
435	July 30	Apink	"Remember"	9,244	
436	August 6	Beast	"YeY"	—N/a	
437	August 13	KCON LA Special Episode, winners were not announced			
438	August 15	KCON NY Special Episode, winners were not announced			
439	August 20	GD & TOP	"Zutter"	10,741	
440	August 27	Girls' Generation	"Lion Heart"	9,868	
441	September 3	Girls' Generation	"Lion Heart"	10,988	
442	September 10	Girls' Generation	"Lion Heart"	10,961	
443	September 17	Red Velvet	"Dumb Dumb"	10,085	
444	September 24	Red Velvet	"Dumb Dumb"	—N/a	
445	October 1	Soyou & Kwon Jeong Yeol	"Lean On Me"	7,137	
446	October 8	iKon	"Rhythm Ta"	7,068	
447	October 15	Taeyeon	"I"	10,929	
448	October 22	Taeyeon	"I"	9,541	
449	October 29	Taeyeon	"I"	10,093	
450	November 5	f(x)	"4 Walls"	10,688	
—	November 12	No Broadcast or Winner			
451	November 19	f(x)	"4 Walls"	—N/a	
452	November 26	Dynamic Duo	"Jam"	—N/a	
—	December 3	No Broadcast or Winner			
—	December 10	No Broadcast or Winner			
453	December 17	Psy	"Daddy"	—N/a	
454	December 24	Psy	"Daddy"	—N/a	
—	December 31	No Broadcast or Winner			
