= Lysn =

South Korean mobile app

- Screenshot Screenshot of the Community tab showing NCT 127, NCT Dream, and Red Velvet] as communities already joined by the user
- Developers: Dear U, (Note: formerly Everysing) SM Entertainment
- Release: 2018
- Operating system: iOS, Android
- Successor: Kwangya Club
- Available in: 8 languages
- List of languages: English, Japanese, Korean, Simplified Chinese, Thai, Traditional Chinese, Vietnamese
- License: Proprietary software with terms of service
- Website: lysn.com

Lysn (Korean: 리슨) was a Korean mobile application created by South Korean company Dear U exclusively for SM Entertainment. The application specializes in artist-to-fan communications and fan club memberships through subscription. Initially launched in 2018, it gained popularity when it introduced the Bubble in February 2020 while expanding its service through the participation of other entertainment companies. Kwangya Club then replaced the application after its termination on July 20, 2022.

== Development ==
SM Entertainment launched its fan community service, Lysn, in 2018. While the proprietary platform is free to use, it is also available for paid fan club membership, where one can have more interactive features and, at the same time, receive a membership box. Announcements, news, events, fan-signing events, music program schedules, and cheering posts of SM's artists are available at the platform. In February 2020, SM launched a service called Dear U Bubble, where it gained immense popularity when it added reply functions and "strengthened" the nature of mobile messengers. On the platform, fans can chat with artists and pay a charge to access Bubble content with a separate charge for each content they subscribe to. Moreover, artists can directly upload unreleased photos and utilize a coded messaging system while also reading and responding to message from numerous fans at once. According to an SM spokesperson, "The contactless platform makes it possible for artists to directly communicate with the fans without any time and space constraints". SM terminated the application's community service on July 20, 2022, and transferred its functions to Kwangya Club.

== Features and tools ==
=== Bubble service ===
Bubble official logotype

Bubble is a paid service by Lysn provided by SM Entertainment's Dear U where by paying 4,500 won per month, users can reply by receiving messages, photos, and videos sent by artists. For artists, they can see these messages in large group chats and reply to the whole group, but not directly to fans. For fans, the UI is like a personal chat between you and the artist. Additionally, it offers a Dear U Bubble service that allows artists and fans to communicate. The service offers in-app translation services to translate from Korean to English which similar platforms like Universe and Weverse have. Since the content posted cannot be leaked from the service, artists tell "more profound stories", and fans feel that they communicate "more closely". Moreover, SM stated that the company is currently continuing to upgrade its functions by providing differential functions for individualization and loyal customers while also planning to expand its service through the participation of other entertainment companies.

SM Entertainment

SM Entertainment artists such as TVXQ, Super Junior, Girls' Generation, Shinee, Exo, Red Velvet, NCT, and Aespa already uses the Bubble service which has been in operation since February 2020.

FNC Entertainment

Previously, Bubble for FNC was launched for FNC Entertainment artists, F.T. Island, CNBLUE, SF9, and N.Flying. It was announced then that Seolhyun, Hyejeong, and Chanmi were also the artists joining the service.

The service was terminated on December 31, 2022.

Jellyfish Entertainment

Previously, Bubble for Jellyfish was launched for existing Jellyfish Entertainment artists, Kim Se-jeong, Verivery, and actor Kim Min-kyu. On September 10, 2021, Dear U announced that VIXX members Leo and Hyuk will be joining the Bubble service on September 13.

JYP Entertainment

On May 6, 2021, Dear U announced that it would launch a Bubble for JYPnation dedicated to JYP Entertainment artists. Artists such as 2PM, Day6, Twice, Stray Kids, and Itzy will participate in the Bubble service. On June 7, NiziU joined the service as the group actively communicated with fans at home and abroad.

WM Entertainment

Previously, Bubble for WM was launched for existing WM Entertainment artists, B1A4 and ONF. On September 6, 2021, it was announced that Lee Chae-yeon, a former Iz*One member, would be opening a Bubble service for the artist.

TOP Media

On May 3, 2021, Dear U announced that it would launch Bubble for Top. Artists of Top Media, such as Niel and Changjo of Teen Top, Kim Woo-seok, Lee Jin-hyuk, and all members of Up10tion will be participating in the Bubble service and exchange messages with fans.

Play M Entertainment

On May 3, 2021, Dear U announced that the company would provide Bubble for Play M to artists belonging to Play M Entertainment. It was reported that Victon would be participating in the service, and it is expected that artists from Play M, other than them, will be able to participate in the future. On July 19, it was stated that Apink would be joining the Bubble service with the participation of members Eunji, Namjoo, and Hayoung.

RBW

On October 5, 2021, Dear U announced that the company would provide Bubble for RBW, a private message application exclusively for artists belonging to RBW. With a total of 18 artists, Oneus, Onewe, and Purple Kiss are reported to be "building a stronger connection" with the public through private communication on Bubble.

Bubble with Stars

On March 29, 2021, it was announced that Chungha would be participating in Bubble with Stars' service. On May 13, Mystic Story announced that their artists, Yoon Jong-shin, Brown Eyed Girls' JeA, Minseo, and Lucy, will be opening a channel for the service and added that they would make more "precious time" with their fans through Bubble. On July 13, it was reported that Hyolyn would be joining the service to present a "special time" for her fans and share her stories with private messaging. On July 1, Dear U announced that OnlyOneOf, a seven-member boy band affiliated with 8D Entertainment, will join the service with all the members' participation. On July 16, the company announced that they would be opening a Bubble service for Kang Hye-won, a former member of Iz*One. On July 28, it was announced that A.C.E would join the Bubble, and all the members will participate in the service. Moreover, Kim Jae-hwan, BDC, Yukika, Yoon Ji-sung, and AleXa have also participated in opening the service. On August 26, it was declared that the 10-member boy group, TO1, would be joining the service. It was announced that Hot Issue would be joining the service on August 31. On September 13, it was stated that Kim Min-ju, a former member of Iz*One, will be joining the service. It was announced that DreamNote, an artist belonging to iMe Korea, will be joining the service on September 27. On October 13, it was announced that STAYC would be joining the service. On May 6, 2022, it was announced that Woo!ah! would be joining the service.

=== Dear U letter ===
The analog version of Bubble, Dear U letter, was made available for registration with a monthly subscription of 7,900 won. The service offers handwritten letters and photo cards written in the artist's handwriting every month. U-Know Yunho of TVXQ and Wendy of Red Velvet are the current artists participating on the service.

=== Fanship ===
Lysn plans to form a strategic alliance with Naver and unify the fan community through Fanship to strengthen video content production. At the same time, the full-scale transfer work has not yet begun. The service is described as "a big data-based fan membership" intended for celebrities to "design fan membership and communicate with subscribed users". Lee Sung-soo, the chief executive officer (CEO) of SM Entertainment, noted the collaboration of SM and Naver in providing "differentiated content for fans and opened a new era of entertainment" in the on-tact era. Naver decided to invest 100 billion won in SM to "create synergy" in creating original digital content for fans of the artists. The new funding will be added to two SM subsidiaries, SMEJ Plus and Mystic Story, with Han Seong-sook, the CEO of Naver, who stated that "Through this investment, we will collaborate with SM more closely and boost Fanship's competitiveness".

== Reception ==
Kim Soo-young of Korea Economic Daily highlighted the service for overcoming physical limitations that are limited to SM Entertainment artists with the power of contents that "strengthen bond formation", concluding that it also gained "strong support" from fans as it can share photos as well as their daily lives with their favorite stars. Lee Eun-ho of Kuki News emphasized its similarity to KakaoTalk for its chat service and open chat room. Ban Jin-wook of Maeil Business Newspaper noted what sets the service apart from other platforms, which was providing separate applications for each entertainment companies. Park Eun-hae of Newsen compared Lysn with existing fan cafes as a platform that has the effect of "increasing" accessibility for foreign fans. Park Seo-bin of Snap Time described the service as an alternative for "deeper communication", further adding that DeepSearch, a financial big data analysis company, stated that the platform is receiving "explosive" responses as it makes fans feel like they are talking directly to stars. Jung Yu-jin of SPOTV News emphasized the "great acclaim" received by the service in the COVID-19 era for its differentiation of being able to communicate with artists in a "private way". Stitch of The Verge called Lysn, along with the Bubble application "truly innovative", highlighting that it "has found a way to give K-pop groups all of the benefits of Twitter DMs, without many of the problems".

Lysn was a relative failure before the introduction of the Bubble messaging service, which made high profits in 2020. According to Hong Jin-seok of Global Economic, Dear U Bubble and Letter, which were in charge of the balance deficits of SM Entertainment, have grown rapidly while improving the break-even point (BEP) level. In the second quarter alone of 2020, Dear U posted 4.2 billion won sales when it launched the Bubble service in February of the same year. One year of the launch of the service, it had already surpassed 1.2 million subscriptions, with the monthly subscription fees adding to an amount of 5.4 billion won.
