= SMCP =

SMCP may refer to:

- SMCP Group, a French fashion company
- SM Culture Partners, a South Korean venture capital company
- Social Mobility and Child Poverty Commission
- Sonic Mega Collection Plus, video game
- Sperm mitochondrial-associated cysteine-rich protein, encoded by the SMCP gene
- Standard Marine Communication Phrases, a communication standard
- St. Maarten Christian Party
