= SM Town Meta-Passport =

South Korean mobile app

- Screenshot Screenshot of the passport page
- Developer: SM Brand Marketing
- Operating system: iOS, Android
- Available in: 2 languages
- List of languages: English, Korean
- License: Proprietary software with terms of service
- Website: smtownandstore.com/product/META-PASSPORT.html

SM Town Meta-Passport (Note: also called as Meta-Passport) (Korean: 에스엠타운 메타-패스포트; stylized as SMTOWN META-PASSPORT) (Note: Although fully named MUSIC NATION SMTOWN META-PASSPORT, software distribution platforms such as App Store and Google Play indicate it as SMTOWN META-PASSPORT.) is a Korean mobile application created by South Korean company SM Brand Marketing, a subsidiary of SM Entertainment. The application is the second service offered by the metaverse brand, Kwangya, and provides a digital passport that grants citizenship for Music Nation SM Town. It also presents membership services, digital stamps that could be obtained during various events, and Ace membership information that would be provided on a visa.

== Development ==
On January 1, 2022, SM Town Live 2022: SMCU Express at Kwangya was broadcast online through various platforms, including YouTube and Beyond Live. On the same day as the performances, SM Entertainment announced the release of Music Nation SM Town Meta-Passport. It is a digital passport that grants citizenship of the virtual country Music Nation SM Town. SM then launched its new concept membership service and had its application opening available at SM Town &Store. It serves as the 2022 version of the Music Nation SM Town Passport issued in 2012.

On August 20, SM Brand Marketing, a subsidiary of SM, launched Music Nation SM Town Meta-Passport and served as the second service of the metaverse brand, Kwangya, after launching its first service of fan community application, Kwangya Club. In August 2012, the inception of Music Nation SM Town was announced, which became one with SM's music and performance. The Music Nation SM Town Passport was distributed to fans and first citizens in 30 countries around the world, had been converted and was newly introduced as the Meta-Passport. The mobile application was then officially launched and was available for download at App Store and Google Play. The service was established starting with SM Town Live 2022: SMCU Express at Human City Suwon held at Suwon World Cup Stadium.

== Features ==
The Meta-Passport incorporates the metaverse origin story of SM Culture Universe (SMCU), the core value and vision of future entertainment, and provides digital passport and membership services. It would also connect the "real world" and the "digital world" and introduce a new layout in which all information is recorded transparently. In addition, it can be received by anyone who is an SM Town member and has downloaded the Meta-Passport mobile application. Digital stamps can be obtained when visiting SM Entertainment's online and offline events, such as performances and fan meetings, along with Ace membership information that would be provided on a visa. The winners of the Meta-Passport advance event held in January at SM Town &Store, SM's official online store, acquired additional benefits of a "special" version of the passport.
