= SM Studios =

South Korean holding company

SM Studios Co., Ltd.
- Native name: 에스엠스튜디오스
- Type: Holding
- Founded: April 5, 2021; 5 years ago
- Defunct: October 3, 2025
- Fate: Merged with SM Entertainment
- Headquarters: 83-21, Wangsimni-ro, Seongdong District, Seoul, South Korea
- Key people: Lee Sung-soo (CEO)
- Services: Drama; Entertainment; New media
- Parent: SM Entertainment
- Subsidiaries: KeyEast (33.7%); SM Culture & Contents (31.7%); Dear U (31.4%); SM Life Design Group (29.3%); Mystic Story

SM Studios (Korean: 에스엠스튜디오스; stylized in all caps) was a South Korean holding company wholly owned by SM Entertainment. It was established after SM restructured its affiliates to focus on its music business. The company managed drama, entertainment, and fields of new media. It was dissolved in 2025 following a merger with SM Entertainment.

== History ==
On April 5, 2021, SM Entertainment revealed through a public announcement that the company had established a new subsidiary, SM Studios, with SM acquiring 195,648 shares for 244,561.93 million won. SM stated that it planned to focus on the music business, the company's original entertainment business, through restructuring. The wholly owned subsidiary was established to promote the restructuring of group affiliates to facilitate the business structure. Additionally, the company was set to promote the efficiency of group management through a "reliable" management system. It was also expected to secure market competitiveness as affiliates related to media studios have coordinated agreements through integrated management of drama, entertainment, and new media fields.

SM invested all of its shares in SM Culture & Contents (SM C&C), KeyEast, SM Life Design Group, Dear U, and Mystic Story to SM Studios. During SM Congress 2021, Kim Young-min, chief executive officer (CEO) of SM Studios, stated that the broadcasting system was SM's "big dream" since the establishment of SM Planning in 1989. In May, SM recruited producers and content experts from SM C&C, KeyEast, and Mystic Story to establish SM Studios and produce "SM Original" content. On November 16, 2022, SM Studios premiered its first "global" content, Welcome to NCT Universe.

On October 3, 2025, SM Studios merged with SM Entertainment. According to SM, the reason for the merger was to "create synergy effects through the integration of management resources, achieve management efficiency, and strengthen business competitiveness".

== Subsidiaries ==
- Dear U (2021)
- KeyEast (2021)
- Mystic Story (2021)
- SM Culture & Contents (2021)
- SM Life Design Group (2021)

== Production works ==
List of production works showing the year, title, and network
Year	Title	Network	Ref.
2022	Welcome to NCT Universe	TVING, Nippon TV, Hulu Japan, Kocowa	
2023	NCT Universe: Lastart	ENA, TVING, Nippon TV, Hulu Japan, Kocowa	
