= Namsan-dong =

Namsan-dong may refer to:

- Namsan-dong, Busan, a dong in Geumjeong District, Busan
- Namsan-dong, Seoul, a dong in Jung District, Seoul
