= SM Institute =

Arts school in Seoul, South Korea

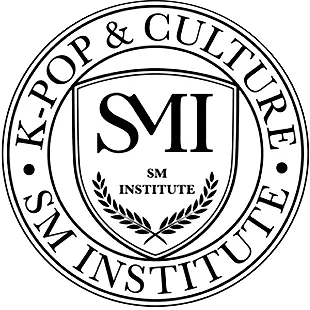
- Other name: SMI
- Founders: SM Entertainment; Jongro Haneul Education
- Established: 2021
- President: Choi Jin-young
- Location: Namsan, Jung District, Seoul, South Korea
- Website: sm.institute/ko (Archived)

SM Institute (Korean: 에스엠 인스티튜트; SMI) is an international art educational institution located in Jung District, Seoul. Through the memorandum of understanding signed by SM Entertainment and Jongro Haneul Education, it was founded in 2021. The institution provides academic programs focused on fostering talents based on K-pop and K-culture.

== History ==
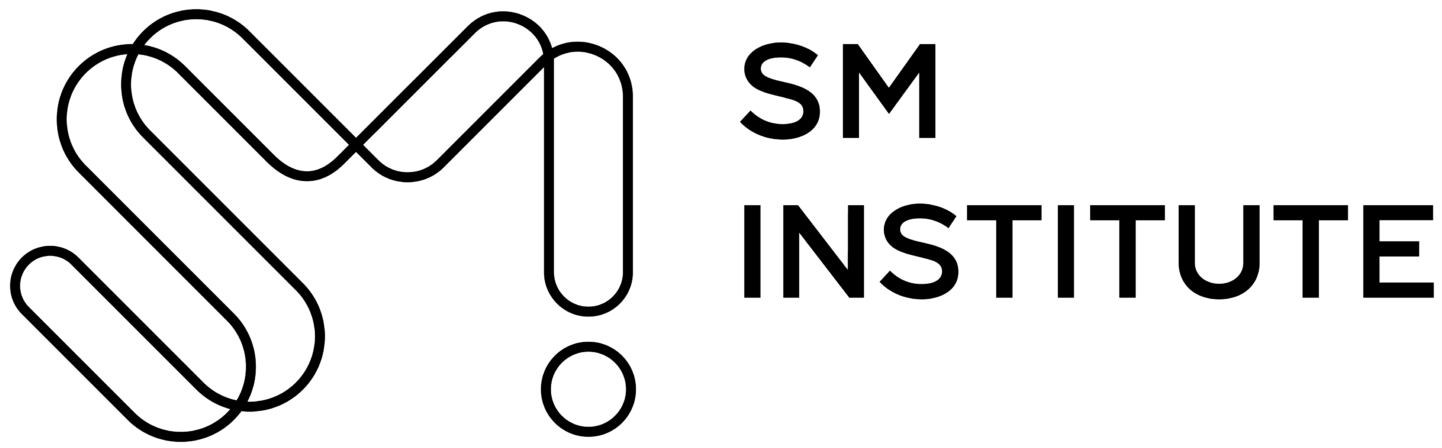
SM Institute logotype

SM Entertainment and Jongro Haneul Education have developed a culture technology (CT) education program focused on SM's celebrity discovery and cultural content production expertise over the past three years since the signing of a memorandum of understanding (MOU) between the two companies in 2016. On September 9, 2020, SM and Jongro announced that they had established SM Institute, an international art education institution. SMI began accepting applications in late 2020 for the initial class, which started in March 2021, and prepared for its global expansion at the beginning of 2021, with its second establishment in Los Angeles and succeeded across major cities in Asia. SME then announced its partnership with Advantages Digital Learning Solutions (ADLS) with Choi Jin-young, SMI president, grasping the prospect of online learning through the affiliation so that students won't have to give up their education to become global stars and have a broad scope of probable pathways for their talents. On December 30, SK Telecom CS T1, an e-sports company, announced that it had signed a business agreement with SMI to foster global e-sports talent.

== Campus and academics ==
SMI will be built on the site of the Dongrang Arts Center, formerly Seoul Institute of the Arts, located in Namsan, Jung District, Seoul. SM and Jongro have been able to formulate Korean and foreign language education programs required for international celebrities. The companies have also laid a foundation for developing educational programs from "outstanding" domestic and foreign educational institutions and companies on securing a place to educate specialized curriculums. SMI provided academic programs to foster talent based on prevalent global cultures such as K-pop and K-culture and language instruction such as Korean, English, Chinese, and Japanese for domestic and international students. ESteem also participates in the establishment and operation of SMI, specializing in models, entertainers, influencer management and fashion, beauty, lifestyle content, and actor academies. In addition to the offline education curriculum, SMI provides services even in the untact era by incorporating adaptive learning technologies and content using advanced educational technology such as artificial intelligence (AI) and plans to export Korea's ed-tech solutions and content overseas. Through the projects integrated with the curriculum, students are expected to acquire real-world and valuable experiences. As a famous cultural artist demands to give up studies, Cho Jin-young noted that SMI provides customized learning scope and program that actively utilizes online learning to help students fulfill their goals.
