= P2C =

P2C may refer to:

- Plasma pressure compaction, a sintering technique
- Play-to-Create, an ecosystem by SM Brand Marketing
- Cervélo P2C, a Cervélo bike

== See also ==
- P2C ATPases, a group of P-type ATPase transport proteins
