= Galaxia SM =

South Korean sports marketing and management company

Galaxia SM, Inc.
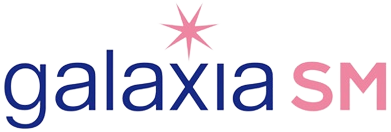
- Native name: 갤럭시아에스엠
- Formerly: IB Worldwide
- Type: Public company
- Traded as: KRX: 011420
- Industry: Advertising; Broadcast programming; Content creation; Digital marketing; Event management; Production; Sport management; Sports marketing
- Founded: November 22, 2004; 21 years ago
- Headquarters: 311 Hakdong-ro, Gangnam-gu, Seoul, South Korea
- Key people: Lee Ban-seok (CEO)
- Revenue: ▲ ₩40.34 billion (US$35.27 million) (2025)
- Net income: ▲ ₩3.72 billion (US$3.25 million) (2025)
- Total assets: ▲ ₩82.85 billion (US$72.43 million) (2025)
- Total equity: ▲ ₩82.85 billion (US$72.43 million) (2025)
- Owner: Trinity Asset Management (22.41%); Cho Hyun-joon (11.35%); Shin Dong Kin (6.30%); Others (59.94%)
- Number of employees: 54 (2025)
- Website: galaxiasme.com

Galaxia SM (Korean: 갤럭시아에스엠; stylized as galaxiaSM) is a South Korean sports marketing and management company under Trinity Asset Management and SM Entertainment with advertising, broadcast programming, content creation, digital marketing, event management, and production business.

== History ==
Established in November 2004, the company specialized in sports marketing, channels, content, and publishing rights and was listed on the KOSPI market in October 2006. The largest shareholder is Trinity Asset Management, an affiliate of the Hyosung Group, with a 22.4% stake in the company and a 37.1% stake, including affiliated parties.

On August 25, 2015, IB Worldwide, and entertainment company SM Entertainment signed a partnership through mutual investment. IB Worldwide announced through the board of directors on the same day that it had decided to raise 11.5 billion won from SM and 8.9 billion won from affiliates of Hyosung Group and changed the company name to Galaxia SM. SM also announced a third-party capital increase of 6.5 billion won for IB Worldwide, marking the first business partnership in South Korea between a sports and entertainment company. Shim Woo-taek revealed that the two companies combined will be able to develop a variety of content and contribute to the national interest by expanding their scope to the global market. Kim Young-min stated that the partnership would be trying to pioneer a global market with a new marketing and business model through the combination of sports and entertainment. The two companies are also expecting various synergies from this strategic alliance by developing sportainment broadcasting content, merchandising businesses, body management system development, and digital marketing business through a multi-channel network (MCN).

== People ==
Galaxia SM supports the sponsorship contracts of the athletes and is in charge of advertising and other management. All information listed is adapted from the company's players page and content page of its official website.

=== Athletes ===
List of athletes and their corresponding sport
| Sport | Player |
|---|---|
| Golf | Ahn Shin-ae |
| Golf | Han Chang-won |
| Golf | Hong Jin-young |
| Golf | Jang Tae-hyeong |
| Golf | Jung Se-been |
| Golf | Kim Min-sun |
| Golf | Kim Na-young |
| Golf | Ko Gyeung-min |
| Golf | Lee Ju-yun |
| Golf | Lim Hee-jeong |
| Golf | Oh Ji-hyun |
| Golf | Park Bo-kyeom |
| Golf | Park Hye-jun |
| Golf | Park Hyun-kyung |
| Golf | Seo Uh-jin |
| Golf | Sohn Ye-been |
| Modern pentathlon | Kim Sun-woo |
| Rhythmic gymnastics | Kim Chae-woon |
| Speed skating | Kim Min-ji |
| Speed skating | Kim Min-seok |
| Speed skating | Kim Min-sun |
| Swimming | Lee Ho-joon |

=== Creators ===
- DocSwing Kim Jun-nyeon
- EvaYoga
- Jopro's Just Turn
- Kim Myung-seop's Fitness Class
- Long-legged Lina
- ManUTube
- Muscular Rich Arnold Hong
- The Point of Swimming
- Water Tank
- WinterPapa
- Working Out Dave
- Yang Löw

== Association partners ==
All sports governing bodies listed are adapted from Galaxia SM's sports marketing page of its official website.

- Korea Basketball Association
- Badminton Korea Association
- Korea Volleyball Association
- Korea Skating Union
- Korea Gymnastics Association
- Korea Curling Federation
- Korean Canoe Federation
- Daejeon Hana Citizen
