= Weverse =

South Korean mobile app and web platform

- Weverse logo since October 2024
- Developers: Weverse Company, (Note: formerly beNX) Hybe Corporation
- Release: June 10, 2019; 7 years ago
- Platform: Android, iOS
- Available in: English; Mandarin; Korean; Japanese; Hindi; Indonesian; Russian
- Type: Social media, entertainment, e-commerce
- Licence: Proprietary software
- Website: www.weverse.co (business); weverse.io (platform); weverseshop.io (shop)

Weverse (Korean: 위버스; RR: wibeoseu) is a South Korean mobile app and web platform created by South Korean entertainment company Hybe Corporation. The app specializes in hosting multimedia content, the sale of artist-related merchandise, content subscription, and artist-to-fan communications for artists.

Weverse hosts a variety of free and paid content including educational and entertainment videos, Instagram Story-style updates, and artist-to-fan interactions and communities for users to connect with each other. The app is also used to publish official statements by Hybe (formerly Big Hit Entertainment) on behalf of artists signed with its labels.

The software was developed by Hybe's technology subsidiary Weverse Company (formerly beNX). As of 2023, Weverse has over 10 million monthly users.

== Development ==
Former app logo from 2019 to July 2022

The app was developed by Weverse Company (formerly beNX), a subsidiary technology company of Hybe Corporation (formerly Big Hit Entertainment) specializing in digital platforms and customer service. According to Weverse Company then president, Seo Wooseok, the app was developed to offer a platform for K-pop artists to interact with fans "on a deeper level" than that offered by YouTube or Twitter, which emphasize content delivery over communication. Hybe then co-CEO Lenzo Yoon characterized the app as a "one-stop service within the music industry."

According to Jenny Zha, CEO of the digital media consultancy firm Infinitize, K-pop "market leaders like BTS", who have amassed significant fan followings, no longer need to focus on being discovered but rather on monetization and ownership of their content. Zha, in an interview with Billboard, explained that "labels want to [...] create an asset they can own and mobilize for other artists and ventures because they know that fans will follow to where the content is. It creates more security for the label for the long term."

Hybe launched the e-commerce platform Weply in June 2019. It later became the app Weverse Shop.

News of the app's development was first announced in October 2019 through an advertisement shown at the beginning of BTS's three-day Love Yourself: Speak Yourself stadium tour in Seoul, South Korea. The advertisement played simultaneously to 130,000 in-person concertgoers, as well as viewers watching via live-stream and in movie theaters.

On January 27, 2021, Naver Corporation announced the transfer of their V-Live service to Weverse Company and its integration with the Weverse platform. On January 1, 2023, V-Live service was officially terminated.

== Platforms and content ==
Weverse is currently available as a website and as an e-commerce, entertainment, and communication-focused app of the same name. The app is available for free for Android on the Google Play Store, iOS on the Apple App Store and Fire TV, Samsung Smart TV, LG Smart TV, Android TV and Apple TV on its respective app stores. The web and app platforms host a variety of free and subscription content including videos, Instagram Story-style updates, and artist-to-fan interactions and communities for users to connect with each other. Communities of acts or artists who are no longer active or have disbanded (e.g. GFriend, NU'EST), whether due to contract expiration or other factors, remain open on Weverse and existing content can still be viewed, but features such as creating new posts and editing profiles are disabled.

Subscriptions for individual series hosted on Weverse, as well as fan memberships and merchandise for the various artists that utilize the platform were originally available for purchase via the Weverse Shop app and website. Following the integration of all shop features and services with the Weverse app—a dedicated Shop icon was added to the home screen—on May 7, 2024, the Weverse Shop app was discontinued.

== Artists ==
Tomorrow X Together was the first artist to join the earliest version of Weverse, on June 11, 2019. Labelmate BTS followed afterwards on July 1, as well as GFriend on August 1. Since then various artists signed to companies under Hybe's multi-label system (such as Seventeen, BoyNextDoor, Le Sserafim), including acts formed as part of joint venture projects (e.g. Enhypen), have also joined.

Artists from YG Entertainment, including Blackpink, Winner, and Treasure, began joining the platform in 2021 following Big Hit's investment in YG Plus. Artists from SM Entertainment joined the platform on September 12, 2023, transferring from the label's own platform Kwangya Club, as a part of an agreement between SM, Hybe, and Kakao Entertainment in early 2023 after the dispute on the right on management over SM Entertainment.

International artists under Universal Music Group (e.g. Gracie Abrams, New Hope Club, Alexander 23, Jeremy Zucker) also utilize the platform, per a formal partnership with Hybe established in 2021. Japanese artists on the platform include XG, Yurina Hirate, AKB48, and Yoasobi. Filipino artists Bini and SB19 joined the platform on March 16 and March 19, 2026 respectively.

== Concerts ==
=== Weverse concerts ===
List of concerts and live performances organized/produced solely by or in conjunction with Weverse
Date	Title	Venue	Organizer(s)	Attendance	Lineup	Ref.
December 31, 2020	2021 New Year's Eve Live Presented by Weverse	Weverse (online)	Hybe Labels, Weverse	—N/a	Artists: Bumzu; BTS; Enhypen; GFriend; Lee Hyun; NU'EST; Tomorrow X Together	
December 31, 2021	2022 Weverse Con: New Era	KINTEX Hall 4 (offline); Weverse, Venewlive (online)	Hybe Labels, Weverse	—N/a	Artists: Justin Bieber (online only); Bumzu; Dvwn; Enhypen; Fromis 9; Lee Hyun; Seventeen; Tomorrow X Together	
October 15, 2022	BTS Yet to Come in Busan	Busan Asiad Main Stadium (offline); Weverse (online)	Hybe, Big Hit Music, Weverse	50,000 (offline); 49.07 million (online)	BTS	
June 10–11, 2023	Weverse Con Festival	KSPO Dome (offline); Weverse (online)	Hybe, Weverse	—N/a	Artists: &Team; Baekho; BoyNextDoor; BTOB; Bumzu; Dvwn; Enhypen; Fromis 9; Hyolyn; Le Sserafim; Lee Hyun; Lightsum; Minhyun; Moonchild; NewJeans; Uhm Jung-hwa; Tomorrow X Together; XIA; Zico; Jeremy Zucker	
June 15–16, 2024	Weverse Con Festival	Inspire Entertainment Resort (offline); Weverse (online)	Hybe, Weverse	22,000 (offline); 18,000 (online)	Artists: &Team; 10CM; Billlie; BoyNextDoor; Eunkwang and Hyunsik; Chuu; Enhypen; Fromis 9; Illit; Imase; JD1; Just B; Kim Jae-joong; Le Sserafim; Lee Sung-kyung; J.Y. Park; Plave; Seventeen; The New Six; Tomorrow X Together; TWS; Xia; Yoasobi	
May 31–June 1, 2025	Weverse Con Festival	Inspire Entertainment Resort (offline); Weverse (online)	Hybe, Weverse	TBA	Artists: &Team; 10CM; BoyNextDoor; Chuu; Dreamcatcher (JiU, SuA, Yoohyeon); Illit; Fifty Fifty; Jeong Sun-ah; Kyuhyun; Lee Mu-jin; Lee Chang-sub; Lightsum; Lun8; Min Kyoung-ah; Nell; Nowadays; P1Harmony; QWER; Tomorrow X Together; Treasure; TWS	

== See also ==
- Hybe Corporation
