= Ever SM Town =

Theme park space and content production at Everland

Everland
- Name: 에버 에스엠타운
- Status: Operating
- Opening date: October 1, 2022

Ride statistics
- Attraction type: Theme park space; content production
- Theme: SM Culture Universe
- Developer: SM Entertainment; Everland
- Website: Official website

Ever SM Town (Korean: 에버 에스엠타운; stylized as EVER SMTOWN) is a theme park space and content production project by SM Entertainment and Everland. The project was formed through a memorandum of understanding (MOU) signed between SM and Everland. It opened on October 1, 2022, with the concept integrated into the theme park's major areas that incorporated SM Culture Universe (SMCU). Various SM artists' intellectual property (IP) was utilized for the artist-experience space throughout the amusement park.

== Development ==
Everland, operated by Samsung C&T Resort Division, disclosed on September 21, 2022, that it would collaborate with SM Entertainment to introduce an artist experience space that combines SM's story. SM and Everland previously signed a memorandum of understanding (MOU) for the directing business using SM's artist intellectual property (IP) in August 2022. The MOU comprises the "world's first experience content" that incorporates the "metaversal" origin story of SM Culture Universe (SMCU), presenting SM's core value and vision of future entertainment. Additionally, the MOU contains the creation of theme park space and content production between the two parties. Named as Ever SM Town Project, SM also announced through Twitter the launch at Everland, located in the city of Yongin in the Gyeonggi province, on October 14, the rolling out of "new experimental content" using IP of SM artists such as Exo, Red Velvet, NCT, and Aespa.

The Ever SM Town was then launched on October 1, wherein diverse digital technologies such as augmented reality (AR) and video and photo zones will be combined into "major" areas of the theme park. These major areas include rides in the theme park, such as the Hurricane, Bumper Car, Amazon Express, and Music Garden, introducing the universe of SM. The bumper cars utilize the concept of NCT 127's fourth studio album, 2 Baddies, released on September 16, where members' names are wrapped around the amusement ride. SM and Everland also released experience content using the IP rights of NCT Dream and Aespa, which started in October of the same year. People would be able to come in contact with artists-experience space and the SM world in various forms while walking around the amusement park.

== Features ==
- Hurricane
- Bumper Car
- Amazon Express
- Music Garden (Note: The concept of Aespa is applied in the Music Garden.)
- Kwangya@Everland (Note: Kwangya@Everland opened on October 14, showcasing SM Entertainment's artists' existing products and Ever SM Town collaboration goods that can only be purchased at Everland.)

== Reception ==
Since Ever SM Town's announcement, it was revealed that the "instantaneous, simultaneous" access to the Everland official website broke its highest record. The theme park also stated that the hashtag "Everland" appeared numerous times on Twitter's real-time trend. About 1,000 people gathered at Kwangya@Everland on opening day, along with a long queue, and sold out the same-day sales within half a day.
