= SM True =

Thai management company

SM True Co., Ltd.
- Company type: Private
- Founded: July 2011; 14 years ago
- Headquarters: Phaya Thai, Bangkok, Thailand
- Key people: Kim Young-min (CEO); Han Kyung-jin (Representative director)
- Services: Management
- Owner: TrueVisions (51%); SM Entertainment (49%)
- Website: www.smtruethailand.com

SM True (Thai: เอสเอ็มทรู) is a Thai management company formed through a joint venture of SM Entertainment and True. The company operates all concerts, promotions, and music and product distribution of SM artists in Thailand and serves as SM's first overseas joint venture.

== History ==
On August 16, 2011, SM Entertainment and True held an event in Bangkok, Thailand, and announced the establishment of SM's first overseas joint venture, SM True. The then-chief executive officer (CEO) of SM, Kim Young-min, became the CEO of SM True, along with Kangta attending the signing ceremony and press conference as the company's registered director. The signing ceremony was held in two parts at Siam Kempinski Hotel and Parc Paragon inside Siam Paragon. The first part was held for daily newspaper outlets such as Daily News, Thairath, and Bangkok Post, as well as Thai business VIPs, while the second part was for Thai entertainment media and music fans, such as Channel V, The Music Channel 3579, and Seventeen Magazine. SM True was established with a capital of 20 million baht (about 718 million won), with TrueVisions holding 51% of the shares and SM holding 49%.

With the establishment of the company, all activities in Thailand, including concerts and promotions, will be conducted through SM True in the future, as well as albums, digital music, and product distribution of SM artists in Thailand. SM True also planned to operate as a management agency that produces local Thai artists. With the establishment of SM True, SM also planned to expand its business model to a wide range of regions that can "effectively" distribute the company's contents in Asia and worldwide. It was reported that True had a partnership model regarding the metaverse with Zepeto. SM True was mentioned as a partner, including content from TrueVisions, combined to deliver services in Zepeto, forming an ecosystem that connects both in terms of selling products in the form of e-commerce and social community about entertainment.

== Controversies ==
People had posted a hashtag, "#SMtruePlsAnswer," on Twitter, tagging SM True's official account after a group of people opened a discussion on Space and "hatefully" mentioned Ten, criticized money donations and called birthday project for their favorite artists as "wasteful." During the Space discussion, "sarcastic" remarks and "negative" comments about the artist involved were also used. Additionally, having the right to choose whether or not to give an artist's work was mentioned, along with telling Ten's fans to "behave well," as it may affect the choice of work for the artist. These made the people question the professionalism and transparency of the company's work, with them using another hashtag, "#SMtrueAnswerNow." The people are demanding SM True to explain why someone is impersonating an insider and investigate the situation.
