= Kwangya Club =

South Korean mobile app

- Screenshot Screenshot of the Clubs tab showing Aespa and Red Velvet as clubs already joined by the user, with NCT Dream and NCT 127 shown on the Discover section of the tab
- Developer: SM Brand Marketing
- Release: September 1, 2022; 4 years ago
- Operating system: iOS, Android
- Available in: 4 languages
- List of languages: English, Korean, Japanese, Chinese
- License: Proprietary software with terms of service
- Website: help.kwangyaclub.com

Kwangya Club (Korean: 광야클럽; stylized in all caps) was a Korean mobile application created by South Korean company SM Brand Marketing, a subsidiary of SM Entertainment. It provided a membership-based official fan club service that offered different community services for SM artists. The application was the first service provided by the metaverse brand, Kwangya. The platform was fully operational on September 1, 2022, after its pilot operations in July. It shut down on September 11, 2023, with all its users moving to Weverse.

== Development ==
It was announced that SM Entertainment would open Kwangya Club, a fan community application and among the first services offered by the metaverse brand, Kwangya. The application would be operated by SM Brand Marketing, a subsidiary of SM. Artists from the company will be firstly employing the service. Additional K-pop artists and celebrities are also planned for future inclusion in the service. It is scheduled to be operational by September after its beta service for two months, starting from July 2022. Before the official launch of the service, SM artists will be consecutively recruited from June 23, 2022, beginning with NCT Dream and Aespa, where related details can be located through the artists' official social media accounts. SM's intention for the service production is to introduce the future metaverse entertainment world with the brand, Kwangya. This will symbolize the company's metaversal origin story of SM Culture Universe (SMCU), considered the core value and vision of future entertainment.

On April 14, 2023, according to entertainment industry insiders, it had been agreed that SM Entertainment artists will join Weverse and Kwangya Club's service will be transferred to the platform. On April 17, 2023 SM Entertainment confirmed these rumours. Kwangya Club shut down on September 11, 2023, with all its artists moving to Weverse the following day.

== Features and tools ==
Kwangya Club was a membership-based official fan club service that delivered different community services for various K-pop artists and celebrity fans locally and internationally. The service recruited free membership (Basic) and annual paid membership (Ace), which received particular benefits related to various services offered under the Kwangya brand. All names and groups listed would be part of the offered service.

- Kangta
- BoA
- TVXQ
- Super Junior
- Girls' Generation
- Shinee
- Exo
- Red Velvet
- NCT 127
- NCT Dream
- WayV
- Aespa
