= Sperm mitochondrial-associated cysteine-rich protein =

Protein found in humans

SMCP

Identifiers
- Aliases: SMCP, HSMCSGEN1, MCS, MCSP, sperm mitochondria associated cysteine rich protein
- External IDs: OMIM: 601148; MGI: 96945; GeneCards: SMCP

Gene location (Human)
Chr.	Chromosome 1 (human)
Band	1q21.3	Start	152,878,322 bp
Band	1q21.3	End	152,885,047 bp

Gene location (Mouse)
Chr.	Chromosome 3 (mouse)
Band	3|3 F1	Start	92,491,174 bp
Band	3|3 F1	End	92,496,304 bp
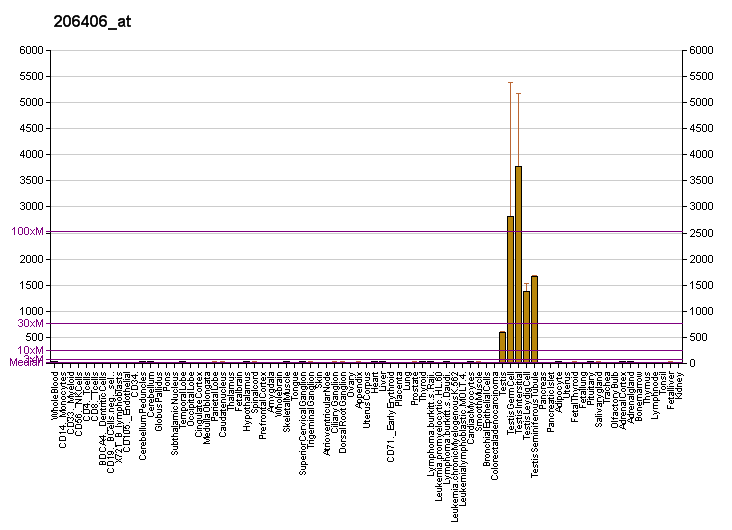
RNA expression pattern
Bgee	Human / Mouse (ortholog); Top expressed in: sperm; right testis; left testis; testicle; buccal mucosa cell; tail of epididymis; gonad; caput epididymis; corpus epididymis; rhombencephalon / Top expressed in: seminiferous tubule; spermatid; spermatocyte; right kidney; proximal tubule; epithelium of small intestine; human kidney; migratory enteric neural crest cell; ileum; zygote; More reference expression data
BioGPS	More reference expression data
Gene ontology
Molecular function	protein binding; molecular function
Cellular component	cytoplasm; mitochondrial membranes; mitochondrion; membrane
Biological process	flagellated sperm motility; penetration of zona pellucida; single fertilization
Sources:Amigo / QuickGO
Orthologs
Databases	NCBI: entry; OMA: entry
Species	Human	Mouse
Entrez	4184	17235
Ensembl	ENSG00000163206	ENSMUSG00000074435
UniProt	P49901	P15265
RefSeq (mRNA)	NM_030663	NM_008574
RefSeq (protein)	NP_109588	NP_032600
Location (UCSC)	Chr 1: 152.88 – 152.89 Mb	Chr 3: 92.49 – 92.5 Mb
PubMed search
- Wikidata
View/Edit Human	View/Edit Mouse

Sperm mitochondrial-associated cysteine-rich protein is a protein that in humans is encoded by the SMCP gene. Originally, this protein was incorrectly thought to be a selenoprotein, and was called sperm mitochondrial capsule selenoprotein (MCSP).

== Function ==
Sperm mitochondria differ in morphology and subcellular localization from those of somatic cells. They are elongated, flattened, and arranged circumferentially to form a helical coiled sheath in the midpiece of the sperm flagellum. The protein encoded by this gene localizes to the capsule associated with the mitochondrial outer membranes and is thought to function in the organization and stabilization of the helical structure of the sperm's mitochondrial sheath.
