= SM Culture Partners =

South Korean venture capital company

- Native name: 에스엠컬쳐파트너스
- Company type: Subsidiary
- Industry: Venture capital
- Founded: March 15, 2022; 4 years ago
- Headquarters: South Korea
- Key people: Jang Jae-ho (CSO)
- Owner: SM Entertainment (100%)
- Website: smculturepartners.com

SM Culture Partners (Korean: 에스엠컬쳐파트너스; SMCP) is a South Korean venture capital company wholly owned by SM Entertainment. The company serves as the technology business financier that would be involved in venture investment of culture- and tech-related companies through indirect investments.

== History ==
SM Entertainment had its first venture investment move when it invested 18 billion won in the new technology business finance association, TechNext Investment Association No. 1, formed by Accelerator (AC) Future Play in 2018. The move was characterized by creating only "pure" private funds without policy funds for free overseas investment, which made Future Play serve as a tech advisor to SM. SM's past investments have been criticized for persistent losses and low business relevance and has planned to set up a "specialized" investment company and start to "discover new growth engines." SM once established a venture company that jumped back into private equity investment after withdrawal. In 2012, SM participated as a "strategic" investor and established SM Contents Investment with a capital of five billion won, but later sold its stake to Party Games in 2017.

According to industry insiders, by March 31, 2022, SM had established SM Culture Partners, a corporate venture capital firm, on March 15. The company is a 100% subsidiary of SM and was able to increase its capital to 30 billion won upon being registered as a new company. It would be considered a new technology business financier and would be involved in venture investment through indirect investment. Jang Jae-ho was appointed as the chief strategy officer (CSO) of the company. It was stated that the company was expected to focus on finding and investing in culture- and tech-related companies.

Lee Sung-soo and Tak Young-jun were named as inside directors of SM Culture Partners. On May 26, 2022, Park Seong-ho, a founding member of Korea Growth Finance Investment Management (K-Growth), joined the company as vice president and was expected to accelerate the process of acquiring a license for the "new technology" business finance company. By August 5, Park Joon-hyung, head of the Korea Venture Investment, was recruited and joined as a director of SM Culture Partners. He also served as the team leader at the fund management headquarters, which is responsible for the investment business and sub-fund management at Korea Venture Investment. With the two Parks joining the company, SM Culture Partners have secured both Korean Venture Investment and K-Growth personnel, which are two major local investment institutions in South Korea.

== Investments ==
On March 29, 2022, Munhwa Broadcasting Corporation (MBC) announced that it would invest in Koy Labs, a Korean language education start-up, along with SM Culture Partners. The company selected Koy Labs as its first investment destination after recognizing the need for "easy and fun" Korean language education. An official from the company stated that they participated in investment in "anticipation of the effect of spreading the Korean language to the global market" expanding the fandom of SM's artists and communication with fans. Both MBC and SM Entertainment Group plan to collaborate and grow Koy Labs into a global service. Koy Labs intended to launch official services using the intellectual property (IP) of MBC and SM in the United States and Southeast Asian markets.

On June 28, 2022, SM Culture Partners and Aventures, participated in an investment for Photo Widget, an iOS-only service that provides themes and widget functions. The service has attracted a series A investment of 3.5 billion won from SM Entertainment Group and 1 billion won from Aventures with a cumulative investment amount of 4.5 billion won. With the investment, Photo Widget has planned to expand various collaborations by using SM's IP. On February 23, 2023, MineIs, a start-up that operates the used fashion shopping service, Charan, garnered 4.15 billion won in seed investment. SM Culture Partners, along with Goodwater Capital, CJ Logistics, T-Investment, Schmidt, and SparkLabs are among those who participated in the investment.

On November 13, 2023, Variety Magazine reported that SM Culture Partners, along with KDDI's subsidiary Global Brain, Sfermion, Laguna Investment and Foresight Ventures, invested $8,000,000 through Series A fundraising into the South Korean record label, entertainment agency and platform company Modhaus, which was founded by former SM Entertainment employee and ex-Blockberry Creative executive Jaden Byung-gi Jeong. Modhaus is home to the girl groups tripleS and ARTMS.

== Programs ==
On May 15, 2023, SM Culture Partners and CNT Tech announced their recruitment for Culturetech Challenge. The program is set to "discover and support" culture-tech startups that have the prospect to produce "new" value by combining culture and technology. It will include metahuman solutions that support the production and activities of virtual artists, new content technology that allows more efficient content creation, and metaverse interaction that creates a virtual space where fans and artists can communicate without time and space constraints. Startups selected through the screening are provided with close accelerating programs such as market verification, mentoring, proof of concept (PoC) with SMCP and SM Entertainment, and demo days for five months, along with opportunities to draw investments of over 100 million won. An SMCP official said that the program would reflect the company's direction to "increase and grow the value" of the local cultural industry with startups.
