= Dear U =

South Korean company

Dear U Co., Ltd.
- Native name: 디어유
- Formerly: everysing (2017–2020) (Note: was changed to Dear U in March 2020)
- Type: Public
- Traded as: KRX: 376300
- Industry: Software development
- Founded: July 4, 2017; 9 years ago
- Headquarters: 4F, 633, Samseong-ro, Gangnam District, Seoul, South Korea
- Key people: Ahn Jong-oh (CEO); Lee Hak-hee (COO)
- Revenue: 74,863,520,691 won (2024)
- Operating income: 31,391,662,643 won (2025)
- Total assets: 243,035,308,819 won (2025)
- Owner: SM Entertainment (46.12%); JYP Entertainment (10%); Ahn Jong-oh (4.38%)
- Website: www.dear-u.co

Dear U (Note: also stylized as DearU) (Korean: 디어유) is a South Korean software development company. The company was formerly called Everysing and was established in July 2017. It merged with Brinicle as it emphasized the union of information technology and entertainment business. It specializes in hosting multimedia content and artist-to-fan communications for artists and offers products and services including Everysing, Lysn, and Bubble.

== History ==
=== 2017–2020: Establishment and merger ===
In July 2017, Dear U was established under the name of Everysing, which was founded by SM Entertainment with an investment of 6 billion won. In September 2018, Avex invested 5 billion won on the company with a capital increase of 500 million won. On January 1, 2019, the company merged with Brinicle, whose main business is software development and supply. After the merger, it provided a fan community platform, Bubble, as its main service. The flagship service of Dear U, Bubble, came from noting SM's experience in managing fan clubs and Brinicle's ability to develop messenger services. Lee Soo-man entrusted the chief executive officer position of the company to Ahn Jong-oh, who was also the CEO of Brinicle. Additionally, Lee has increased the related manpower pool while emphasizing the combination of information technology and entertainment business.

=== 2021–present: Restructuring and stock acquisition ===
First Dear U logotype

On March 16, 2021, Dear U announced that they have raised the annual salary of all its employees by 15 million won. The company raised its annual salary to secure high-quality manpower to develop Bubble and Lysn applications. Lee Hak-hee, the chief operating officer of the company stated that Dear U is "paying attention" in "securing competitiveness" through "excellent" human resources. Through a public announcement on April 5, SM Entertainment established a wholly owned subsidiary to promote the restructuring of group affiliates and to improve business structure. It was reported that SM would invest in SM Studios as it established a new corporation with all shares of SM Culture & Contents, KeyEast, SM Life Design Group, Dear U, and Mystic Story, on which it seeks to streamline group management through a responsible management system as it plans to focus more on the music business.

On June 4, 2021, SM reported that JYP Entertainment had acquired a 23.3% stake in Dear U as it began to expand its influence in the platform business. JYP announced the acquisition of an additional 14.1% of the old common stock of the company owned by SM Studios. Previously, on May 26, JYP had an acquisition of 1,682,000 shares of the company's old common stock. It had a stake of 9.1%, at about 8.4 billion won, and the final number of shares acquired was 4,285,192 shares with a 23.3% stake, and the investment amount was about 21.4 billion won. Its goal is to grow Dear U Bubble into a competitive mobile platform in the global market, noting the "synergy" between the two companies with global networks.

Previously, the entertainment industry and investment banking industry reported that Dear U is currently undergoing due diligence to apply for a preliminary examination for listing on the Korea Exchange. On June 11, 2021, the company submitted a preliminary review request for KOSDAQ listing to the Korea Exchange and started the initial public offering (IPO) process. It aims to be listed in the second half of this year in order to establish itself as a leading company in the global market, and the listing organizer is Korea Investment & Securities. Through the IPO, the company is planning to increase its "corporate awareness" and invest in developing a global message platform that will provide various services such as entering overseas markets and expanding platforms such as metaverse. It listed about 16,812,769 shares, of which near 20% will be put up for public offering.

== Products and services ==
=== Lysn and Bubble service ===
Dear U's core business, Dear U Bubble, is a service platform that receives personal messages written by artists. It can be downloaded from application markets and purchase it as a regular subscription for 4,500 won per month. Starting with SM Entertainment, Dear U Bubble, which was launched in February 2020, has signed contracts with a total of 25 local entertainment companies, including JYP Entertainment, FNC Entertainment, Jellyfish Entertainment, WM Entertainment, Brand New Music, Play M Entertainment, Top Media, RBW and Mystic Story, and is currently with a total of 39 groups and 21 solo artists, with a total of 247 artists. It was reported that the service has a "steady increase" in the number of subscribers, with the current share of global users reaching 70%. In the future, it plans to recruit not only Korean artists, but also American and Japanese artists as it plans on continuing to expand various additional services in order to strengthen its position as a "global platform".

List of Bubble services offered by Dear U
Application	Participating Artist	Company	Ref.
Lysn	Artists: 1. Kangta; 2. TVXQ! – U-Know Yunho, Max Changmin; 3. Super Junior – Leeteuk, Heechul, Yesung, Sungmin, Eunhyuk, Donghae, Siwon, Kyuhyun; 4. Girls' Generation – Taeyeon, Sunny, Tiffany (as Sublime Artist Agency artist), Hyoyeon, Yuri, Yoona; 5. Shinee – Onew, Key, Minho, Taemin; 6. Exo – Suho, Chanyeol, D.O., Kai, Sehun; 7. Red Velvet – Irene, Seulgi, Wendy, Joy, Yeri; 8. NCT – Taeil, Johnny, Taeyong, Yuta, Doyoung, Jaehyun, Jungwoo, Mark, Renjun, Jeno, Haechan, Jaemin, Chenle, Jisung; 9. WayV – Kun, Ten, Winwin, Xiaojun, Hendery, Yangyang; 10. aespa – Karina, Giselle, Winter, Ningning; 11. Lucas	SM Entertainment	
Bubble for Jellyfish	Artists: 1. Kim Se-jeong; 2. Kim Min-kyu; 3. Verivery – Dongheon, Hoyoung, Minchan, Gyehyeon, Yeonho, Yongseung, Kangmin; 4. VIXX – Leo, Hyuk, Ken	Jellyfish Entertainment	
Bubble for JYPnation	Artists: 1. 2PM – Jun. K, Nichkhun, Wooyoung, Junho; 2. Day6 – Sungjin, Young K, Wonpil, Dowoon; 3. Twice – Nayeon, Jeongyeon, Momo, Sana, Jihyo, Mina, Dahyun, Chaeyoung, Tzuyu; 4. Stray Kids – Bang Chan, Lee Know, Changbin, Hyunjin, Han, Felix, Seungmin, I.N; 5. ITZY – Yeji, Lia, Ryujin, Chaeryeong, Yuna; 6. NiziU – Mako, Rio, Maya, Riku, Ayaka, Mayuka, Rima, Miihi, Nina; 7. Nmixx - Lily, Haewon, Sullyoon, Bae, Jiwoo, Kyujin; 8. Xdinary Heroes - Gunil, Jungsu, Gaon, O.de, Jun Han, Jooyeon; 9. J. Y. Park	JYP Entertainment	
Bubble for WM	Artists: 1. B1A4 – CNU, Sandeul, Gongchan; 2. ONF – Hyojin, E-Tion, J-Us, Wyatt, MK, U 3. Chaeyeon; 4. Oh My Girl - Hyojung, Mimi, Seunghee, Yubin, Arin	WM Entertainment	
Bubble for Top	Artists: 1. Teen Top – Ricky, Changjo; 2. Up10tion – Jinhoo, Kuhn, Kogyeol, Bitto, Sunyoul, Gyujin, Hwanhee, Xiao; 3. Kim Woo-seok; 4. Lee Jin-hyuk	Top Media	
Bubble for IST	Artists: 1. Victon – Han Seung-woo, Kang Seung-sik, Lim Se-jun, Do Han-se, Choi Byung-chan, Jung Su-bin; 2. Apink – Jung Eun-ji, Kim Nam-joo, Oh Ha-young; 3. Bandage - Lee Chan-sol, Kang Kyoung-yoon, Shin Hyun-bin; 4. Weeekly - Lee Soo-jin, Monday, Park So-eun, Lee Jae-hee, Jihan, Zoa; 5. The Boyz - Sangyeon, Jacob, Younghoon, Juyeon, Kevin, New, Q, Ju Haknyeon, Sunwoo, Eric	IST Entertainment	
Bubble for RBW	Artists: 1. Oneus – Seoho, Leedo, Keonhee, Hwanwoong, Xion; 2. Onewe – Yonghoon, Harin, Kanghyun, Dongmyeong, CyA; 3. Purple Kiss – Na Go-eun, Dosie, Ireh, Yuki, Chaein, Swan; 4. Park Ji-eun; 5. Mamamoo+ - Solar, Moonbyul	RBW	
Bubble with Stars	Artists: 1. Chungha; 2. Kim Jae-hwan; 3. BDC – Kim Si-hun, Hong Seong-jun, Yun Jung-hwan; 4. Yoon Jong-shin; 5. JeA; 6. Minseo; 7. Lucy – Shin Ye-chan, Choi Sang-yeop, Jo Won-sang, Shin Gwang-il; 8. Yukika; 9. Hyolyn; 10. Yoon Ji-sung; 11. AleXa; 12. OnlyOneOf – KB, Rie, Yoojung, Junji, Mill, Nine; 13. Kang Hye-won; 14. A.C.E – Jun, Donghun, Wow, Kim Byeong-kwan, Chan; 15. TO1 – Donggeon, Chan, Jisu, Jaeyun, J.You, Kyungho, Daigo, Renta, Yeojeong; 16. Kim Min-ju; 17. DreamNote – Boni, Youi, Lara, Miso, Sumin, Eunjo; 18. STAYC – Sumin, Sieun, Isa, Seeun, Yoon, J 19. Tri.be – Songsun, Kelly, Jinha, Hyunbin, Jia, Soeun, Mire; 20. Yuju; 21. Hong Eui-jin; 22. Laboum; 23. Nature - Sohee, Aurora, Saebom, Lu, Chaebin, Haru, Roha, Uchae; 24. BZ-Boys - Choi Tae-woong, Bon, Double.D, Jeong Seung-hyun, Lee Ha-min; 25. Seori; 26. 10cm - Kwon Jung-yeol; 27. Se So Neon - So Yoon; 28. Kim So-won; 29. Jamie; 30. Minzy; 31. Raon; 32. DKB - E-Chan, Teo, D1, GK, Heechan, Lune, Junseo, Yuku, Harry June; 33. Yoo Chae-hoon; 34. Gaho; 35. Luminous - Youngbin, Suil, Steven, Woobin; 36. Ciipher - Tan, Hwi, Hyunbin, Keita, Tag, Dohwan, Won; 37. BAE173 - J-Min, Hangyul, Yoojun, Muzin, Junseo, Youngseo, Doha, Bit, Dohyon; 38. Yoo Ji-ae; 39. Noze; 40. Cnema - Kim Seul-ong, Byun Jeong-ho, Im Yoon-seong, Kitak; 41. Bolbbalgan4; 42. Woo!ah! – Nana, Wooyeon, Sora, Lucy, Minseo; 43. Seo Ji-soo; 44. Mirae - Lien, Lee Jun-hyuk, Yoo Do-hyun, Kael, Son Dong-pyo, Park Si-young, Jang Yu-bin; 45. Yoon Seo-bin; 46. Aiki (Hook); 47. Billlie - Moon Sua, Suhyeon, Haram, Tsuki, Sheon, Siyoon, Haruna; 48. H1-Key - Seoi, Riina, Hwiseo, Yel; 49. Lee Woo; 50. Kim Han-gyul; 51. Kim Do-hee; 52. Seo Wool; 53. Son Ho-young; 54. Jeon Somi; 55. Craxy - Woo-ah, Karin, Hyejin, Swan, ChaeY; 56. Blitzers - Jinhwa, Go_U, Juhan, Sya, Chris, Lutan, Wooju; 57. Monika (Prowdmom); 58. Lip J 59. Heo Young-saeng; 60. Xeed - Doha, Bao, Jaemin, Roni; 61. Boramiyu; 62. Choi Yu-ree; 63. CSR - Sua, Seoyeon, Yeham, Geumhee, Duna, Sihyeon, Yuna; 64. Kard - J.Seph, BM, Somin, Jiwoo; 65. Ryu Su-jeong; 66. Teen Top - Niel; 67. Hwanhee; 68. Young-jae; 69. Yerin; 70. Yein; 71. Ichillin' - Jiyoon, E.Ji, Jackie, Joonie, Chaerin, Yeju, Chowon; 72. AIMERS - Seunghyun, Eunjun, Doryun, Yoel, Seunghwan, Wooyoung; 73. Tiffany Young; 74. Mimiirose - Hyori, Yeonjae, Yewon, Jia, Yunju; 75. WEi - Daehyeon, Donghan, Yongha, Yohan, Seokhwa, Junseo; 76. AB6IX - Woong, Donghyun, Woojin, Daehwi; 77. B.I; 78. Monsta X - I.M; 79. Choi Ye-na; 80. Tempest - Hanbin, Hyeongseop, Hyuk, Eunchan, Lew, Hwarang, Taerae; 81. Kep1er - Yujin, Xiaoting, Mashiro, Chaehyun, Dayeon, Hikaru, Huening Bahiyyih, Youngeun, Yeseo; 82. Jo Yu-ri; 83. Adora; 84. Kwon Eun-bi; 85. Drippin - Yunseong, Hyeop, Changuk, Dongyun, Minseo, Junho, Alex; 86. Song Yuvin	Companies: 1. MNH Entertainment; 2. Swing Entertainment; 3. Brand New Music; 4. Mystic Story; 5. Ubuntu Entertainment; 6. Bridʒ; 7. DG Entertainment; 8. ZB Label; 9. 8D Entertainment; 10. Beat Interactive; 11. Wake One Entertainment; 12. S2 Entertainment; 13. Urban Works Media; 14. Management SOOP; 15. iMe Korea; 16. High Up Entertainment; 17. TR Entertainment; 18. Universal Music Korea; 19. Mellow Entertainment; 20. Konnect Entertainment; 21. Interpark Music Plus; 22. n.Ch Entertainment; 23. Chrome Entertainment; 24. ATISPAUS; 25. Magic Strawberry Sound; 26. OUI Entertainment; 27. Warner Music Korea; 28. MZ Entertainment; 29. Accelers; 30. Brave Entertainment; 31. MAJOR9; 32. Moss Music; 33. Studio Jamm; 34. Planetarium Records; 35. SE Group Entertainment; 36. Rain Company; 37. PocketDol Studio; 38. KPlus; 39. MOLIP KOREA WAACKERS; 40. FLO; 41. Shofar Entertainment; 42. NV Entertainment; 43. DSP Media; 44. Peace Angels Company; 45. GLG; 46. Sony Music Korea; 47. KH Company; 48. The Black Label; 49. Sai Entertainment; 50. Wuzo Entertainment; 51. YS Company; 52. MYDOLL Entertainment; 53. NATURE SPACE; 54. A2Z Entertainment; 55. House of Dreams; 56. NEW ENTRY; 57. BT Entertainment; 58. Sublime; 59. KM Entertainment; 60. HYPER RHYTHM; 61. Yes Im Entertainment; 62. Totalset Entertainment; 63. 131 Label; 64. IOK Music; 65. Yuehua Entertainment; 66. Aura Entertainment; 67. Woollim Entertainment; 68. Flex M	
Bubble for Starship	Artists: 1. Monsta X - Shownu, Minhyuk, Kihyun, Hyungwon, Joohoney; 2. WJSN - Seola, Bona, Exy, Soobin, Eunseo, Yeoreum, Dayoung, Yeonjung; 3. Cravity - Serim, Allen, Jungmo, Woobin, Wonjin, Minhee, Hyeongjun, Taeyoung, Seongmin; 4. Ive - Yujin, Gaeul, Rei, Wonyoung, Liz, Leeseo	Starship Entertainment	
Bubble for Cube	Artists: 1. BtoB - Eunkwang, Minhyuk, Changsub, Hyunsik, Peniel, Sungjae; 2. (G)I-dle - Miyeon, Minnie, Soyeon, Yuqi, Shuhua; 3. Lightsum - Sangah, Chowon, Nayoung, Hina, Juhyeon, Yujeong; 4. Oh Seung-hee; 5. Kwon Eun-bin	Cube Entertainment	
Bubble for BPM	Artists: 1. Ren; 2. Viviz - Eunha, SinB, Umji; 3. Soyou	BPM Entertainment	
Bubble for Sports	Athletes: 1. Kim Yeon-koung; 2. Yang Hyo-jin; 3. Yoo Hee-kwan; 4. Choi Ji-man; 5. Jeong Seung-won; 6. Kim A-lang; 7. Hwang Dae-heon; 8. Kwon Soon-woo; 9. Kim Da-gyeom; 10. Han Yoo-mi	—N/a	
Bubble for Actors	Actors/Actresses: 1. Im Soo-hyang; 2. Park Jin-young; 3. Ahn Bo-hyun; 4. Shin Eun-soo; 5. Shin Ye-eun; 6. Kim Kang-min; 7. Danny Ahn; 8. Kim Joo-ryoung; 9. Park Ji-bin; 10. Oh Seung-hoon; 11. Jang Gyu-ri; 12. Han Gyu-min; 13. Lee Seo-young; 14. Joo Hyun-young; 15. Cha Woo-min; 16. Ham Sung-min; 17. Park Ji-hwan; 18. Jung Da-eun; 19. Shin Yeon-suh; 20. Lee Hyun-wook; 21. Jeong Taek-hyeon	Companies: 1. FN Entertainment; 2. BH Entertainment; 3. Npio Entertainment; 4. Mystic Story; 5. Cuz-9 Entertainment; 6. Just Entertainment; 7. Urban Works; 8. Origin Entertainment; 9. AIMC; 10. Big Smile Entertainment; 11. Muea Entertainment; 12. Management Air	
Bubble for Treasure Hunter	Content Creators: 1. Kim Egg (김달걀); 2. Kkulkkul Suna (꿀꿀선아); 3. Friendshiping (우정잉); 4. Edmmer (에드머); 5. Wanana (와나나); 6. Chodan (쵸단)	Treasure Hunter	
Bubble for INB100	Artists: 1. Xiumin; 2. Baekhyun; 3. Chen	INB100	
Bubble for GOLDMEDALIST	Artists: 1. Kim Soo-Hyun; 2. Choi Hyun-wook; 3. Kim Su-gyeom; 4. Lee Chae-min	Gold Medalist	

List of defunct Bubble services offered by Dear U
Application	Participating Artist	Company	Date of defunct	Ref.
Bubble for FNC	Artists: 1. F.T. Island – Lee Hong-gi, Lee Jae-jin, Choi Min-hwan; 2. CNBLUE – Jung Yong-hwa, Kang Min-hyuk, Lee Jung-shin; 3. AOA - Hyejeong, Seolhyun, Chanmi; 4. N.Flying – SeungHyub, Cha Hun, Kim Jae-hyun, Yoo Hwe-seung, Seo Dong-sung; 5. SF9 – Youngbin, Inseong, Jaeyoon, Dawon, Zuho, Yoo Tae-yang, Hwiyoung, Chani	FNC Entertainment	December 31, 2022	
