= SM Brand Marketing =

South Korean company

SM Brand Marketing Co., Ltd.
- Native name: 에스엠브랜드마케팅
- Company type: Private
- Industry: Intellectual property; Licensing; Management; Marketing consultation; Planning; Management consulting
- Founded: August 19, 2008; 17 years ago
- Headquarters: 왕십리로 83-21 아크로 포레스트 D타워, Seoul, South Korea
- Parent: SM Entertainment
- Website: www.smbrandmarketing.com

SM Brand Marketing (Korean: 에스엠브랜드마케팅; SMBM) is a South Korean intellectual property, licensing, management, marketing consultation, planning, and management consulting company under SM Entertainment. The company was established on August 19, 2008, and has operated SM Town Coex Artium, Sum, Sum Market, and Sum Café. It currently employs its e-commerce platform SM Town &Store and retail store SM Town &Store@DDP.

== History ==
On August 19, 2008, SM Entertainment announced that it would establish SM Brand Marketing, adding it to its affiliates. The company is in charge of brand planning and marketing consulting, such as planning, branding, and marketing on lifestyle businesses encompassing the restaurant industry, fashion, and food and beverage industries. Sum, a celebrity shop run by the company, is where items related to the artists are sold and is located on the second floor of closed SM Town Coex Artium. (Note: SM Town Coex Artium closed after six years to reduce fixed costs for asset efficiency and the expiration of the rental agreement.) The shop offers merchandise products commercializing the company's artists. SMBM also operates its global e-commerce platform SM Town &Store and retail shop SM Town &Store@DDP.

The company also partnered with The Sandbox for its metaverse platform, P2C ecosystem, and SM Town Land, a themed space created in K-verse, an area for K-content in The Sandbox. SMBM and The Sandbox will plan and create NFT products using their IP, production know-how, and technology and jointly operate a fan-participating service.

== Brands ==
- SM Town &Store (Note: It is an online store by SM where consumers can purchase SM artists' merchandise and lifestyle products while also offering various shopping services. As Hana Card formed a strategic alliance with SM Brand Marketing, Hana and SM released the SM Town &Store cards for young people in their 20s and 30s familiar with fandom culture and preferred online purchases by analyzing data from various customers.)
- SM Town &Store@DDP
- SM Town Meta-Passport

Defunct

- SM Town Coex Artium
- Sum (Note: It is a general retail store that started operating in 2015 that sells stationery, household goods, and cosmetics-advertised or recommended by celebrities.)
- Sum Market (Note: It is a convenience store chain that deals with content related to SM artists and markets SM artist-themed food.)
- Sum Café
- Kwangya Club
