= Namsan-dong, Seoul =

Neighbourhood in Seoul, South Korea

Namsan-dong
- Country: South Korea

Korean name
- Hangul: 남산동
- Hanja: 南山洞
- RR: Namsan-dong
- MR: Namsan-dong

Namsan-dong (Korean: 남산동) is a legal dong, or neighbourhood of the Jung District, Seoul, South Korea and governed by its administrative dong, Myeong-dong.

== See also ==
- Administrative divisions of South Korea
