= SM Entertainment =

South Korean entertainment company

SM Entertainment Co., Ltd.
- Logo used since 2017
- Native name: SM 엔터테인먼트
- Formerly: SM Studio (1989–1995)
- Type: Public
- Traded as: KRX: 041510
- Industry: Music; entertainment; technology
- Founded: February 14, 1989; 37 years ago (as SM Studio); February 14, 1995; 31 years ago (as SM Entertainment)
- Founder: Lee Soo-man
- Headquarters: SM Entertainment 83-21, Wangsimni-ro, Seongsu-dong, Seongdong-gu, Seoul, South Korea
- Area served: Worldwide
- Key people: Jang Cheol-hyuk (Co-CEO); Tak Young-jun (Co-CEO); Jang Jung-min (CFO); Kim Tae-hyun (CLO); Hong Gil-hwa (CHRO); Kim Ji-won (CRO); Choi Jung-min (CGO); Lee Sung-soo (CAO)
- Services: Artist management; Album and digital music planning; Record production; Music distribution; Music publishing
- Revenue: ▲ ₩812.5 billion (US$606.22 million) (2025)
- Net income: ▲ ₩124.6 billion (US$92.97 million) (2025)
- Total assets: ▲ ₩2.01 trillion (US$1.5 billion) (2025)
- Total equity: ▲ ₩1.36 trillion (US$1.01 billion) (2025)
- Owner: Kakao (21.61%); Kakao Entertainment (19.89%); Tencent Music (9.66%); T. Rowe Price Associates, Inc. (8.01%); Others (41.47%)
- Number of employees: 765 (2025)
- Subsidiaries: See subsidiaries
- Website: smentertainment.com smtown.com

SM Entertainment Co., Ltd. (Korean: SM엔터테인먼트) is a South Korean multinational entertainment agency established in 1995 by Lee Soo-man. It is one of South Korea's largest entertainment companies and has been responsible for fostering and popularizing the careers of many K-pop stars garnering huge global fanbases. The company operates as a record label, talent agency, music production company, event management and concert production company, and music publishing house. SM Entertainment is known for having led the worldwide K-pop phenomenon and the musical side of "Hallyu", also known as the "Korean Wave", with early overseas successes such as H.O.T., S.E.S., and BoA.

The label currently represents K-pop artists such as Kangta, TVXQ, Super Junior, Girls' Generation, Shinee, Exo, Red Velvet, NCT, Aespa, Riize, Naevis, Hearts2Hearts and XngHan&Xoul.

== History ==
=== 1989–2000: Creation and first-generation artists ===
Company logo until October 2017

After graduating from California State University, Northridge in the United States, Lee Soo-man returned to Korea and in 1989 established what was then known as "SM Studio" in the Apgujeong neighborhood of Gangnam, Seoul and signed hip hop singer Hyun Jin-young. While Hyun's music was well received, he was later arrested on charges of marijuana and methamphetamine use, from which his career never fully recovered.

During SM struggles, Lee Soo-man witnessed the success of New Kids on the Block and Seo Taiji and Boys in Korea. The company surveyed teenagers to understand their preferences and subsequently formed a boy band that could sing, dance, and rap, targeting a teenage audience. SM's first boy band, H.O.T., drove the company growth and helped establish a more structured system. ensuring that his artists, nurtured by a training system, had a clean image, in addition to singing and dancing skills.

In February 1995, the company changed its name to SM Entertainment and set up its capital fund. SM developed an in-house system that looked after all aspects of its artists' careers. Lee's approach was targeted at teenage audiences, and took a holistic view of the qualities needed to become a successful entertainer. SM launched a string of successful artists, including boy band H.O.T. in 1996, girl group S.E.S. in 1997, boy band Shinhwa in 1998, R&B duo Fly to the Sky in 1999, and soloist BoA in 2000. Jung Hae-ik was CEO during this period, and was succeeded by Kim Kyung-wook in 1998.

=== 2000–2005: Affiliations and second-generation artists ===
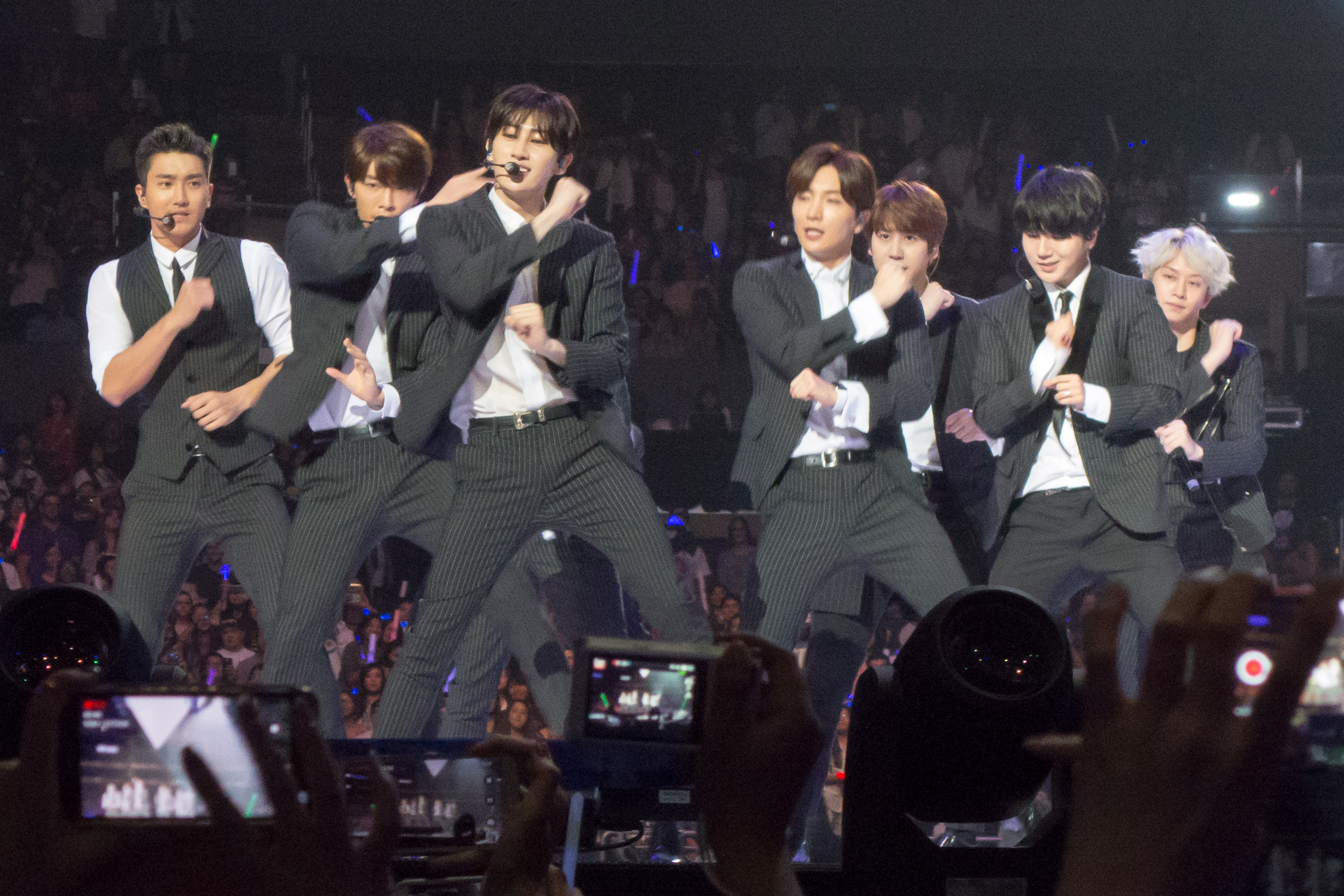
Super Junior at KCON in 2015.

In 2000, SM became the first entertainment company to be listed on KOSDAQ, and established an affiliate company called Fandango Korea to operate its online business. The early 2000s saw the disbandment of both H.O.T (in 2001) and S.E.S (in 2002). Shinhwa departed to a new agency, and new acts like the girl group M.I.L.K. and the boy band Black Beat failed to attain the popularity of previous SM artists. As the domestic music market experienced a slump, SM shifted its focus to international expansion. In January 2001, the company founded an overseas division, SM Entertainment Japan, in collaboration with Japanese record label Avex Trax and television production company Yoshimoto Kogyo, to promote BoA in the Japanese market.

In 2003, SM became affiliated with Starlight Academy System, a private academy that trained aspiring singers and actors. That same year, the company debuted five-member boy group TVXQ. The following years saw the debuts of artists such as TRAX (2004), The Grace (2005), and Super Junior (2005).

=== 2005–2010: Expansion and international artists ===
In 2005, Kim Young-min became the company's third CEO, under whom several artists debuted with a view to promoting outside of South Korea. Artists produced by SM during this period included Chinese-born soloist Zhang Liyin (2006), Japanese-language soloist J-Min (2007), Girls' Generation (2007), Shinee (2008), and f(x) (2009). In April 2008, SM debuted a Mandarin-language sub-unit of Super Junior, named Super Junior-M. In September 2008, SM announced plans for BoA's debut in the American market, under a newly formed subsidiary label named SM Entertainment USA.

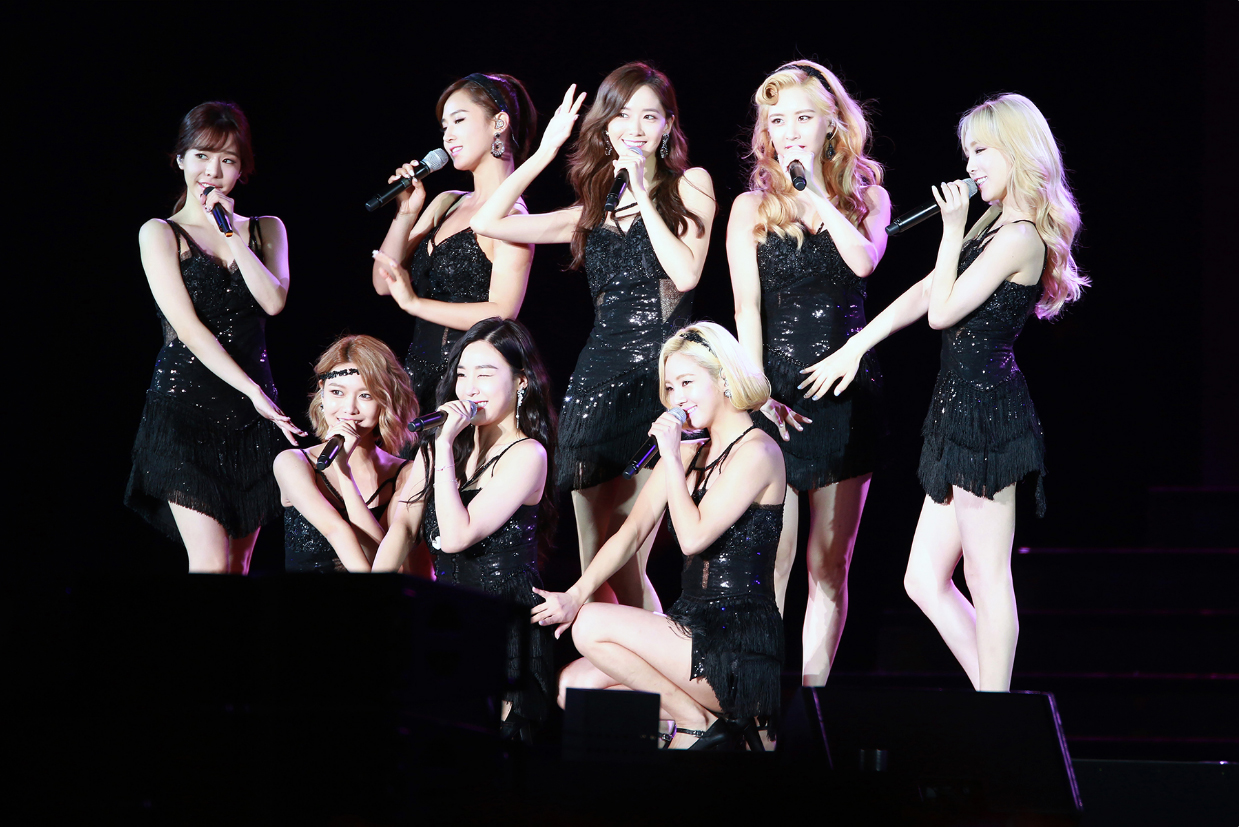
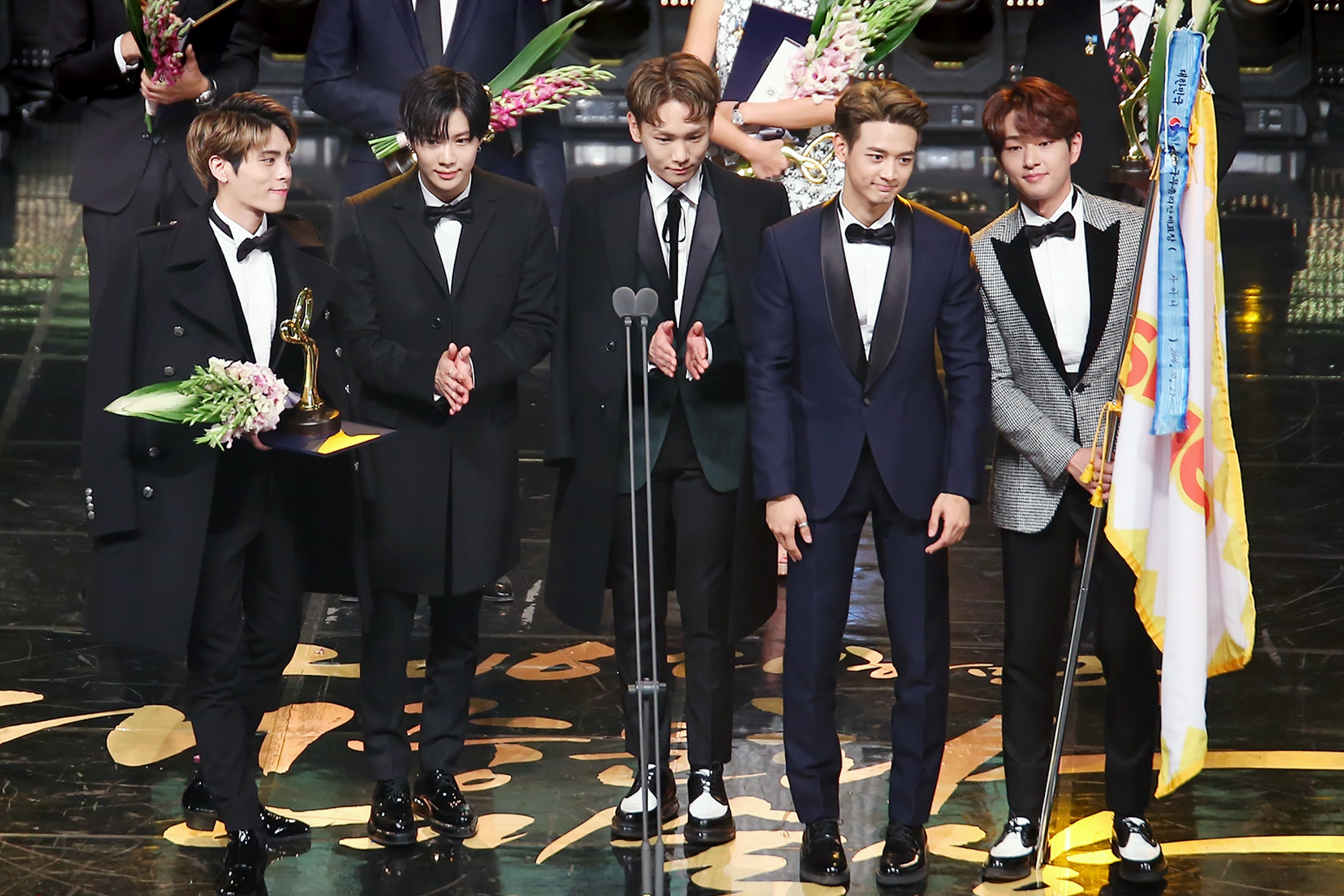
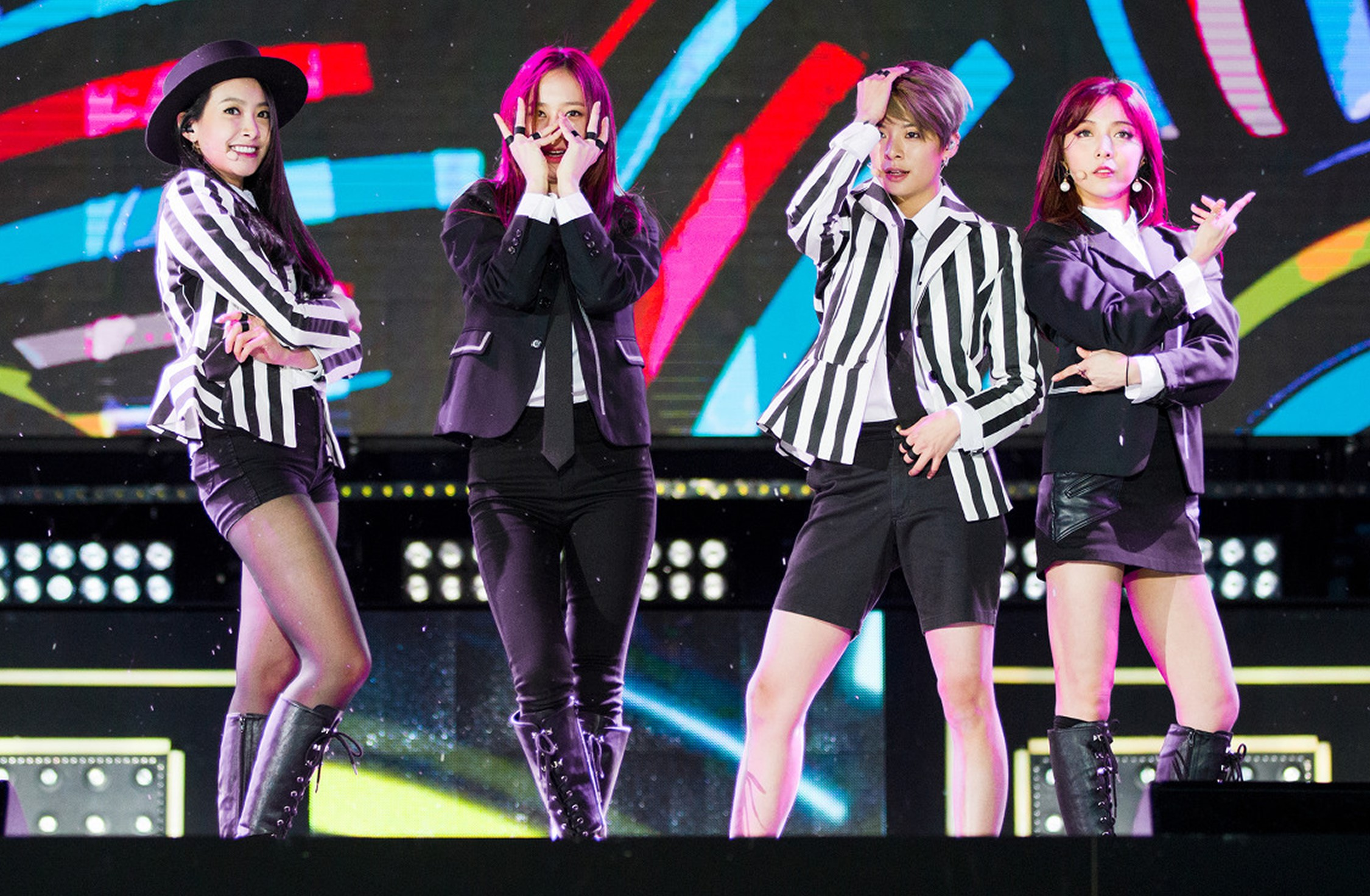
From 2007–2009, SM consecutively debuted Girls' Generation, Shinee, and f(x) (pictured left to right).

In May 2008, the SM Art Company opened under co-CEO Pyo In-bong, with a focus on producing theatrical works. The company's first venture was a production of the American musical comedy Xanadu, starring Super Junior members Heechul and Kangin.

=== 2010–2012: Joint and further ventures ===
In February 2010, after two decades on SM's board of directors, founder Lee Soo-man resigned from his position in order to "focus more energy on SM's overseas business, new business management, and artist development." In March of the same year, KMP Holdings was established as a joint venture between SM, YG Entertainment, JYP Entertainment, Star Empire, Medialine, CAN Entertainment, and Music Factory. The firm's first release from SM was Super Junior's fifth studio album, Mr. Simple, which marked the end of SM's self-distribution.

In April 2011, SM, YG, JYP, KeyEast, AMENT, and Star J Entertainment came together to form United Asia Management, a joint investment agency geared towards advancing Asian music worldwide. That August, SM joined with Thai media company TrueVisions to create an international joint venture, SM True.

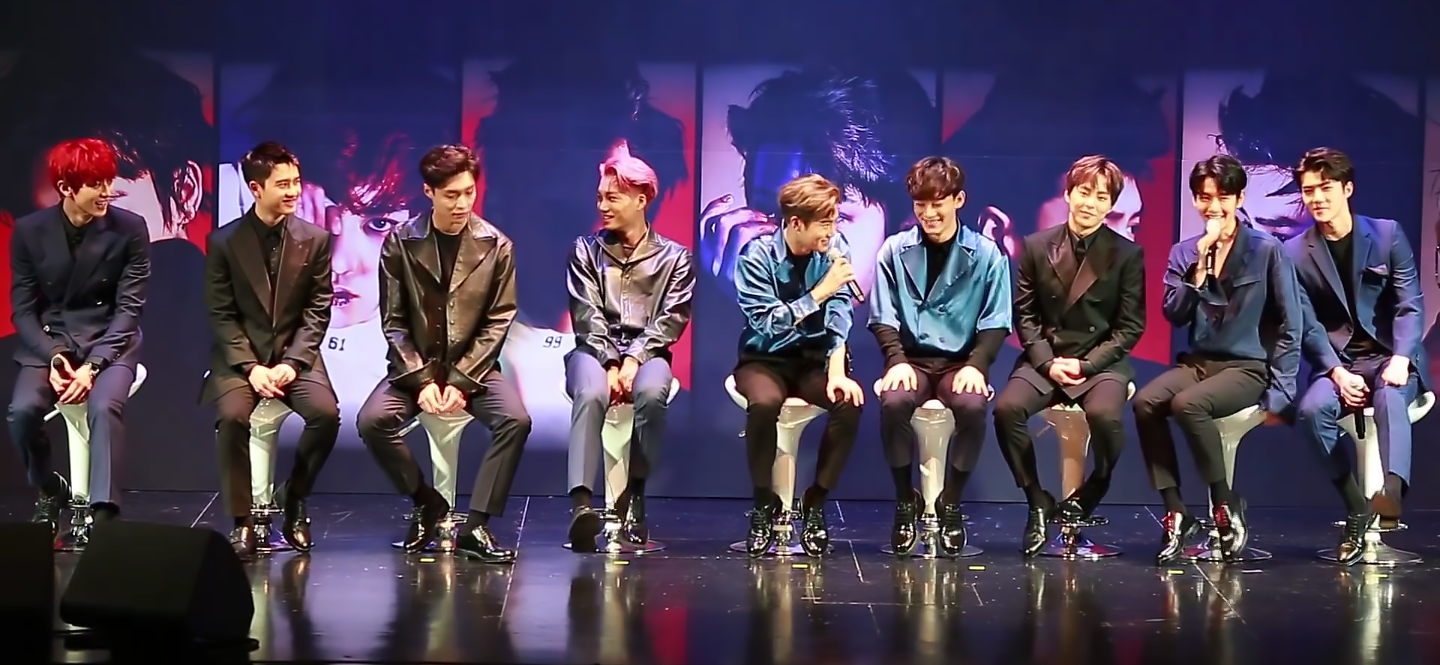
Exo in June 2016

In 2012, SM debuted the large-scale boy group Exo, split into two units in order to promote in Korea and China simultaneously. In February, SM acquired Hawaiian travel firm Happy Hawaii and launched SMTown Travel, a new business initiative specializing in travel and tourism under Kang Jung-hyun. Later that year, SMTown Travel offered package deals for overseas fans attending Super Junior's Super Show 4 Tour encore concerts in Seoul. In March, 47 of SM's recording artists became stockholders of the company. Kangta, BoA, and most members of Super Junior and Girls' Generation received 680 shares each (with a value of approximately US$27,200 per person), while members of more recent groups like Shinee and f(x) received 340 shares each (with a value of around US$13,600 per person). In August, SM held an art exhibition at the COEX Convention & Exhibition Center, and collaborated with Visa and KB Kookmin Card to begin printing SM artist cards. That same month, Korean TV personalities Kang Ho-dong and Shin Dong-yup announced that they had signed exclusive contracts with SM's new broadcasting subsidiary, SM Culture & Contents (SM C&C), marking SM's expansion into television. The next month, in September, SM C&C merged with AM Entertainment (which then represented top actors such as Jang Dong-gun, Kim Ha-neul, and Han Ji-min), and two other TV personalities, Lee Su-geun and Kim Byung-man, announced that they had also signed with SM. In November, KMP Holdings was acquired by KT Music, and in June 2013, KT Music absorbed KMP's distribution network.

=== 2013–2016: Third-generation artists and new music ventures ===
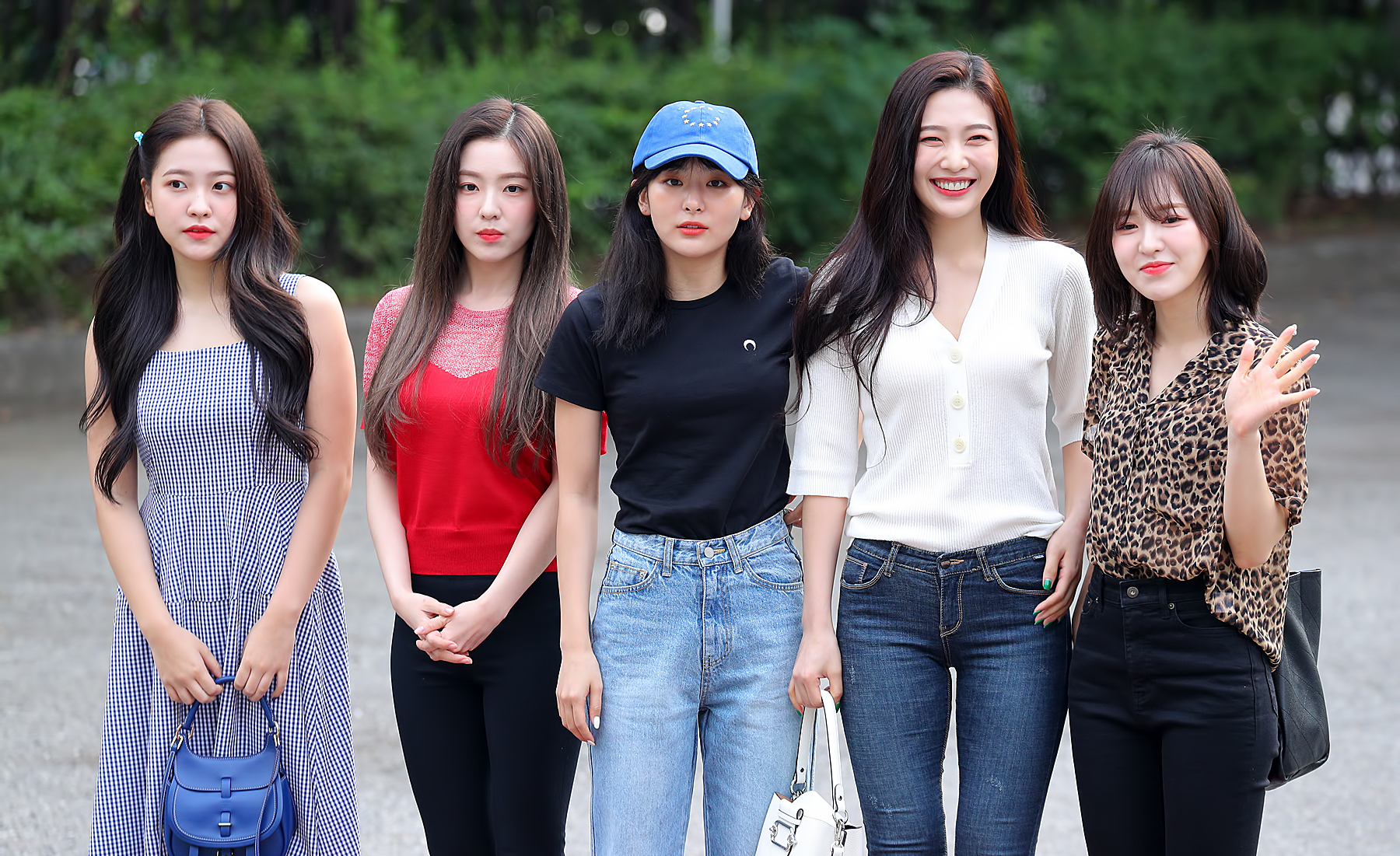
Red Velvet going to a recording of Music Bank in June 2019

In 2013, SM C&C acquired Hoon Media (a production company led by Lee Hoon-hee, responsible for KBS serials 1 vs 100, Heroines 6, Qualifications of Men, and Music Bank) and Woollim Entertainment, a record label responsible for artists such as Infinite.

In January 2014, SM and the other six talent agencies behind KMP Holdings formed a collective bond partnership and bought 13.48% of KT Music's stocks, leaving parent KT Corporation with 49.99%. In February, SM acquired a share in Baljunso, an indie record label founded in 1991 by Kang Byung-yong. On August 1, SM debuted Red Velvet, its first girl group since f(x) five years prior.

In August 2015, SM partnered with sports marketing company IB Worldwide to create Galaxia SM, responsible for golfer Park In-bee, gymnast Son Yeon-jae, and Choo Shin-soo, right fielder for the Texas Rangers. On November 6, the 10th anniversary of Super Junior's debut, SM announced the creation of the group's own sub-label, Label SJ. In late 2015, SM partnered with modeling company ESteem to promote self-owned content and network. The venture later expanded its acting division through the acting debuts of models Ki Do-hoon and Lee Cheol-woo. In 2015, SM had reported revenues of KR₩325 billion (approximately US$287 million) and a net income of KR₩21.7 billion (US$19 million).

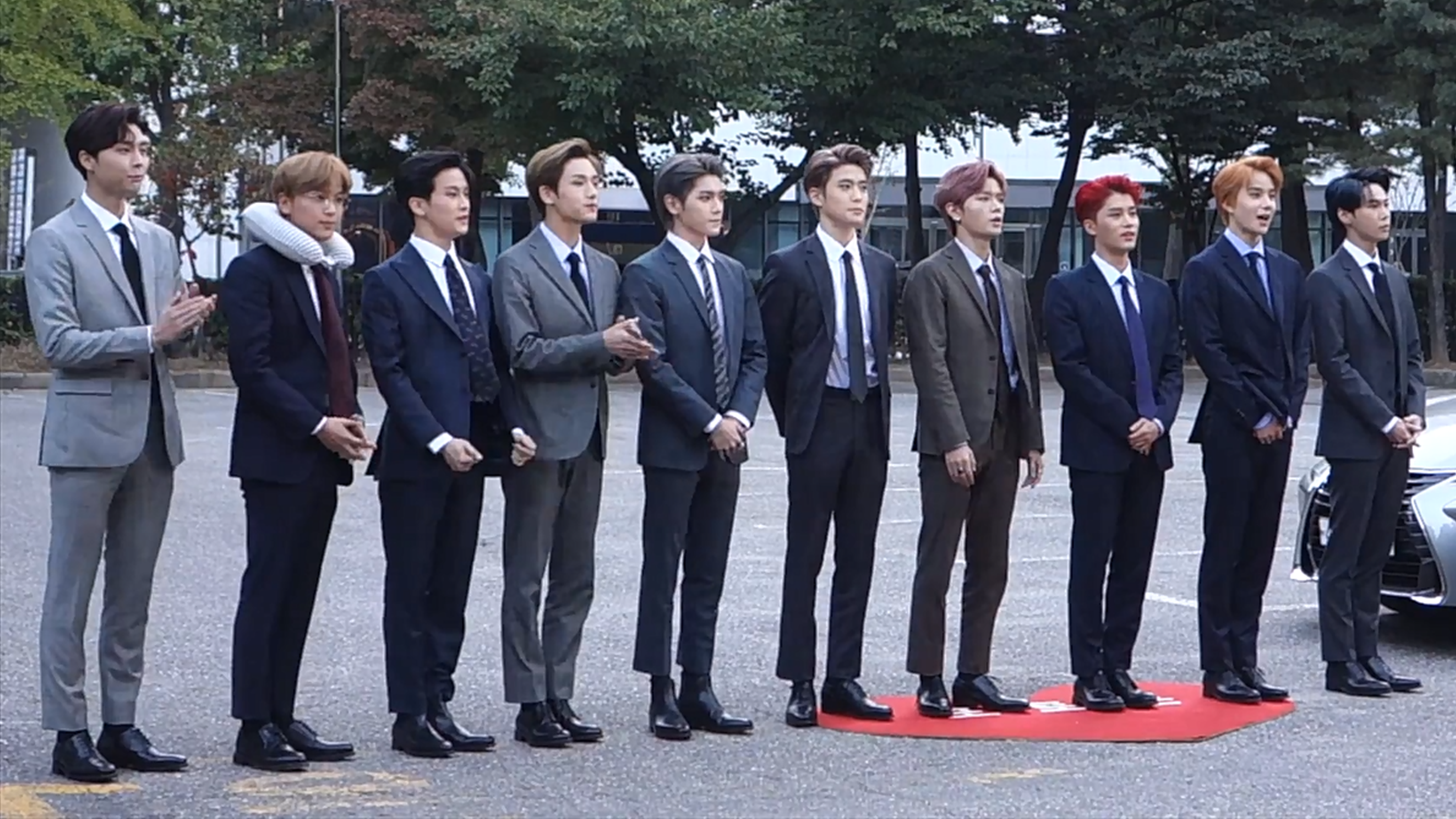
NCT 127 during a recording of Music Bank in October 2018

In January 2016, founder Lee Soo-man held a conference at the SM Coex Artium, announcing plans for a new boy group, NCT, an acronym for Neo Culture Technology, with "unlimited members". Its first sub-unit, NCT U, released two debut singles in April 2016. NCT added two more units that year – NCT 127 in July 2016 and NCT Dream in August 2016.

At the beginning of 2016, the company opened a restaurant, SMT Seoul, and also established a series of stores selling branded foods under the name SUM Market. On February 11, 2016, the Chinese e-commerce giant Alibaba Group acquired a 4% minority stake in SM Entertainment for US$30 million. On May 5, 2016, SM released the first single under its newly established EDM label ScreaM Records, "Wave", featuring f(x) members Amber and Luna and produced by Xavi & Gi and E-mart's Electro Mart. ScreaM Records opened as part of SM's New Culture Technology 2016 project, under which SM also initiated the digital music channel SM Station and a number of mobile apps. In late 2016, SM began organizing a League of Legends tournament, called SM Super Celeb League, in which SM artists Heechul and Baekhyun played against both professional gamers and fans from South Korea and China.

=== 2017–2022: NCT expansion, business expansion and the end of "SM 2.0" era ===
In March 2017, SM acquired the independent record label Mystic Entertainment, becoming the label's largest shareholder. In March 2018, SM acquired entertainment agency KeyEast and drama production company FNC Add Culture, a subsidiary of FNC Entertainment. Two months later, FNC Add Culture changed their name to SM Life Design Group. On October 2, 2018, it was revealed SM had acquired Million Market, home to singer-songwriters, rappers and R&B singers. In October 2018, SM partnered up with Trans Media of Indonesia, which was owned by CT Corp. In February 2019, Trans Media and SM signed their Heads of Joint Venture Agreement together. Later, on the same month, SM opened its Indonesian office in Jakarta.

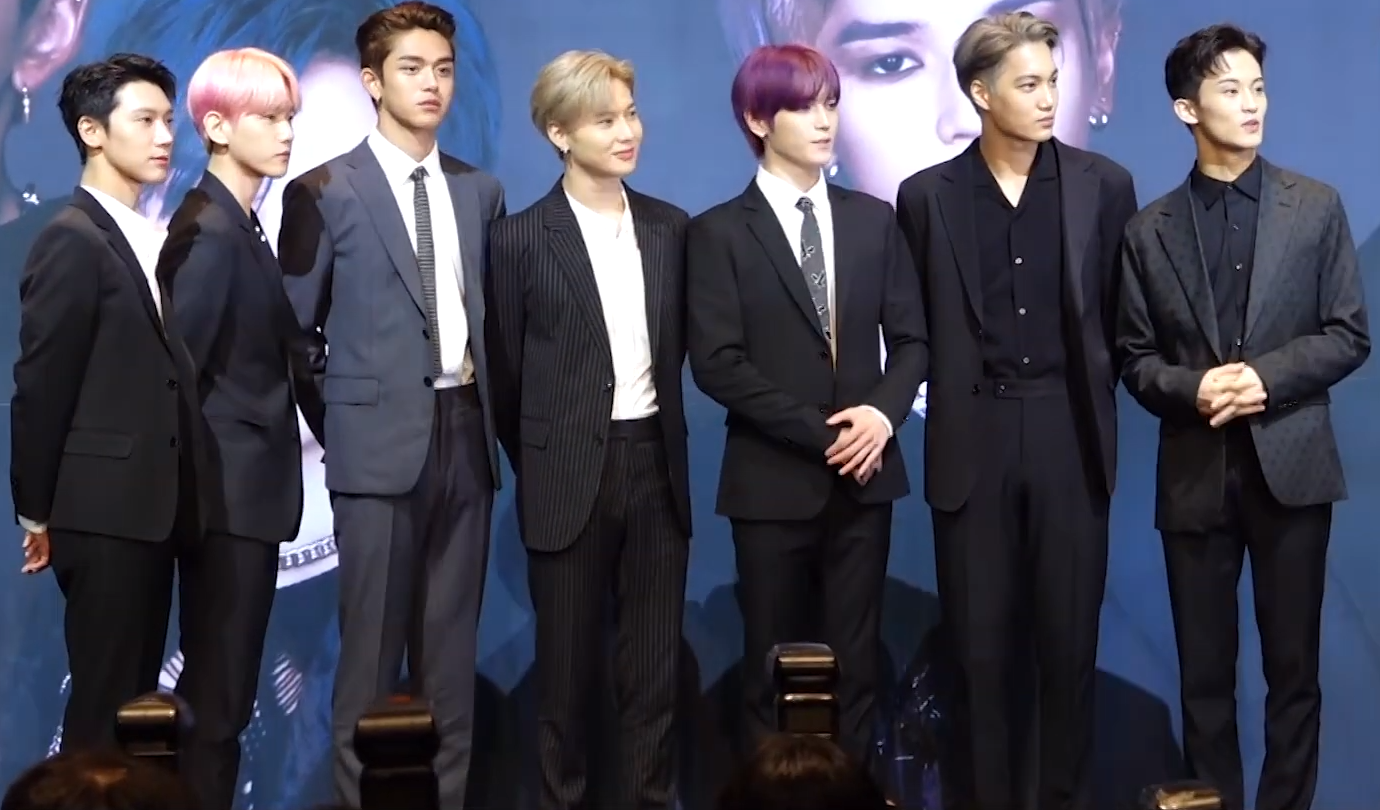
SuperM at a press conference in October 2019

In January 2019, SM debuted NCT's China unit, boy group band WayV, managed by the sub-label Label V. On August 8, 2019, SM and Capitol Music Group – which earlier signed NCT 127 in April 2019 – announced SuperM, a supergroup consisting of Taemin from Shinee, Baekhyun and Kai from Exo, and Taeyong, Ten, Lucas and Mark from NCT units NCT 127, NCT Dream and WayV, in the 2019 Capitol Congress event in Los Angeles. The group debuted in October 2019. The group's self-titled EP entered the Billboard 200 albums chart at number one, making SuperM the first Asian artist in history to top the US album chart with a debut release. In November 2019, SM signed with Creative Artists Agency for representation in all areas. In March 2020, SM appointed production head Lee Sung-soo as the company's CEO, as well as Tak Young-jun as SM's chief marketing officer (CMO).

In April 2020, SM and Naver signed a memorandum of understanding (MOU) with the purpose of expanding the global reach of concerts. The joint effort led to the creation of Beyond Live, a series of online live concerts, which were created in light of the ongoing COVID-19 pandemic. The concerts were hosted on Naver's V Live app and made available to audiences from more than 200 countries. On August 3, Naver invested ₩100 billion in SM, intended for their subsidiaries SMEJ Plus and Mystic Story, as well as Beyond Live. SM also integrated its fan club service into V Live's Fanship platform. A day later, SM announced its partnership with JYP Entertainment to establish Beyond Live Corporation, a joint company for producing Beyond Live concerts. SM Coex Artium closed in June 2020. On June 12, it was announced that SM partnered with the Seoul Philharmonic Orchestra to release orchestral versions of their artists' most popular songs under the label SM Classics. Aespa, SM's first new girl group in six years, debuted with their digital single "Black Mamba" on November 17.

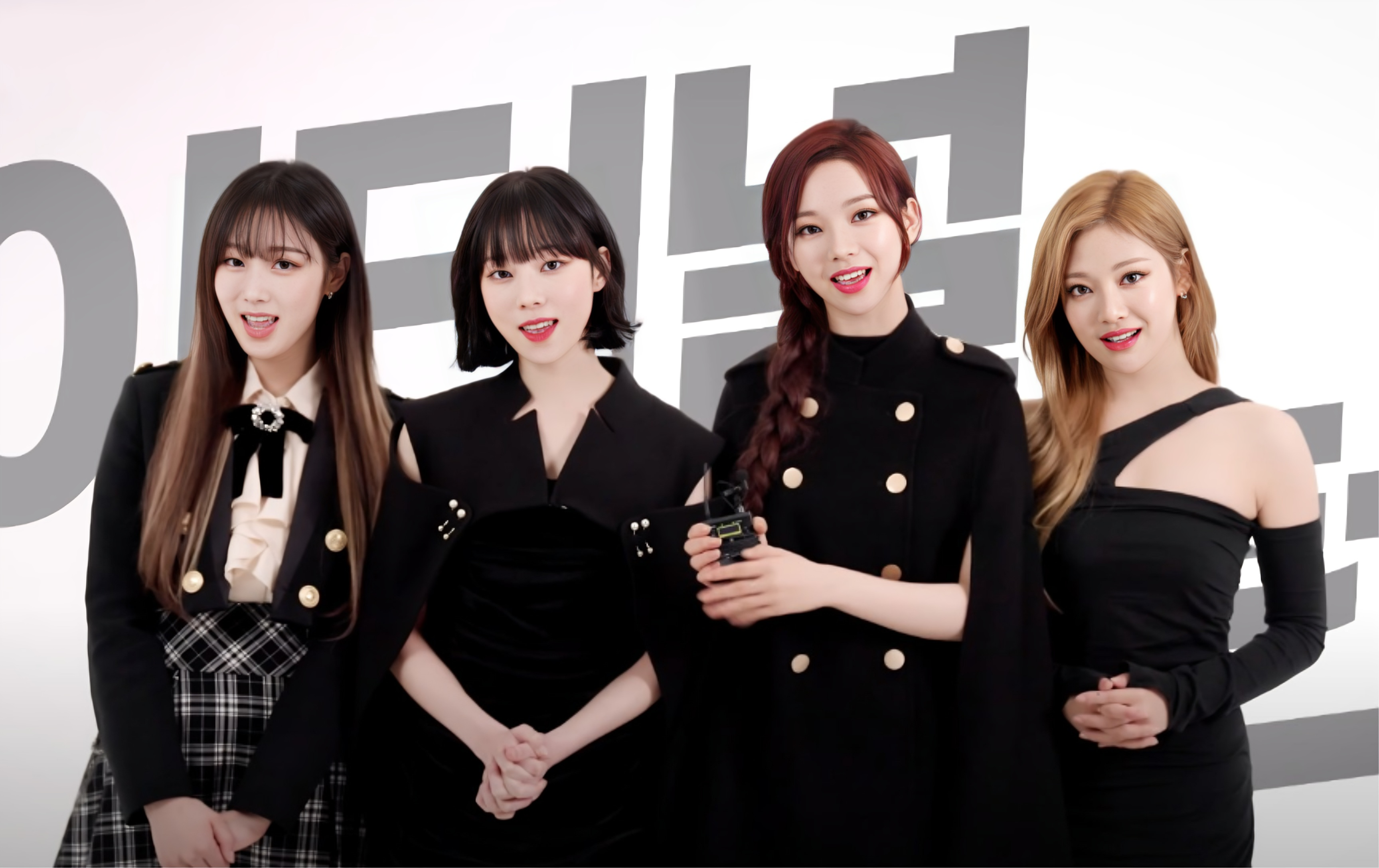
Aespa in November 2021

SM partnered with Jongro Haneul Education to launch SM Institute, an educational facility to train local and international aspiring artists; the institute opened in March 2021. On December 27, 2021, SM announced the creation of their rotational all-female supergroup Girls On Top. The group's first lineup, Got the Beat, consists of BoA, Taeyeon and Hyoyeon from Girls' Generation, Seulgi and Wendy from Red Velvet, and Karina and Winter from Aespa. The group released their debut single "Step Back" on January 3, 2022.

On October 1, 2022, an amusement park collaboration between SM and Everland was launched, based on artists and concepts within the SM Culture Universe (SMCU), called Ever SM Town. On December 1, SM announced that the company would set up its Southeast Asian headquarters in Singapore, which would manage joint ventures in Indonesia, Thailand and Vietnam. The company planned to launch retail businesses such as cafes, merchandise stores and pop-up exhibitions in the region. At the end of the year, SM terminated its production contract with founder Lee Soo-man's company Like Planning.

=== 2023–present: Announcing "SM 3.0" era and major adjustments ===
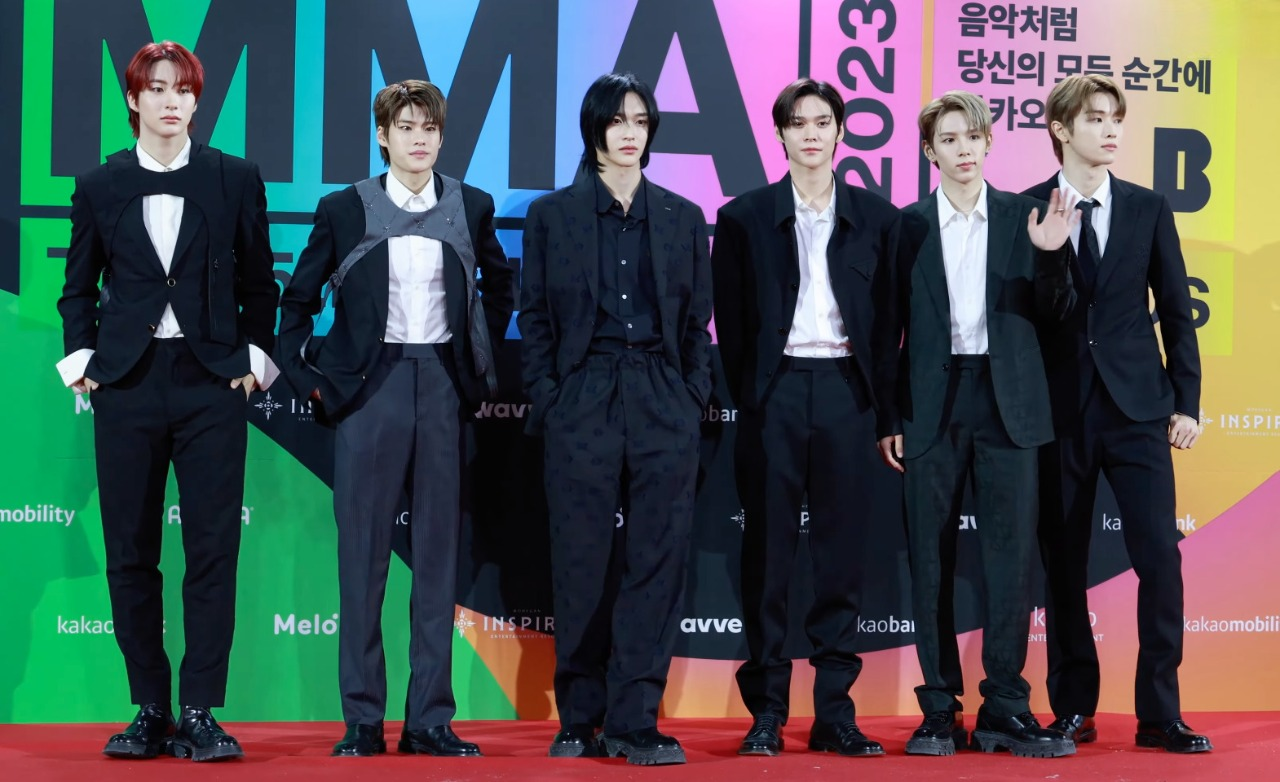
Riize at the 2023 Melon Music Awards

On February 3, 2023, SM released a video titled "SM 3.0: Producing Strategy Multi 'Production Center/Label' System" on its official YouTube channel, in which co-CEOs Lee Sung-soo and Tak Young-jun revealed that the label was passing from its "2.0" era to the "3.0 era", with major adjustments to come concerning the label's operations. These included shifting from a one-man production system led by founder and executive producer Lee Soo-man to a system under which multiple production teams, both internal and external, would supervise music production and artist promotions. A goal of the new system was to avoid production delays. On February 6, it was announced that Kakao had purchased a 9.05% stake of SM Entertainment, becoming the company's second-largest shareholder at the time. The next day, Lee Soo-man filed an injunction against SM Entertainment for its issuance of new shares and convertible bonds to Kakao, stating the deal between the companies was "illegal" without his permission as the largest shareholder. Two days later, it was announced that Hybe Corporation had become SM Entertainment's largest shareholder after acquiring a 14.8% stake from Lee Soo-man for approximately 422.8 billion won, with the company subsequently acquiring Galaxia SM's 1% stake on March 3, increasing their share to 15.8%.

On March 3, 2023, a South Korean court issued an injunction against SM Entertainment's deal with Kakao. On March 6, 2023, Kakao launched a tender offer bid, in which it sought to acquire 35% of SM Entertainment's shares, in addition to the 4.9% stake already owned by the company. On March 12, 2023, Hybe announced that it no longer planned to acquire a majority stake in SM Entertainment, saying that the bidding war with Kakao could "damage shareholder value". On March 24, 2023, Hybe announced that it would sell its entire stake in SM Entertainment to Kakao by participating in its tender offer. On March 28, 2023, Kakao announced that it had successfully acquired a 35% stake in SM Entertainment through its tender offer bid, resulting in a combined 39.87% stake between Kakao and its subsidiary, Kakao Entertainment, making it the largest shareholder. Hybe sold half of its stake in SM to Kakao, leaving it with 8.81%. On March 31, 2023, during the shareholders' meeting, SM Entertainment appointed chief financial officer (CFO) Jang Cheol-hyuk as its new CEO. Former co-CEO Lee Sung-soo returned to his role in A&R as chief A&R officer (CAO). Lee Soo-man declared the meeting "the end of an era" for the company he founded, stating he was "moving toward the future".

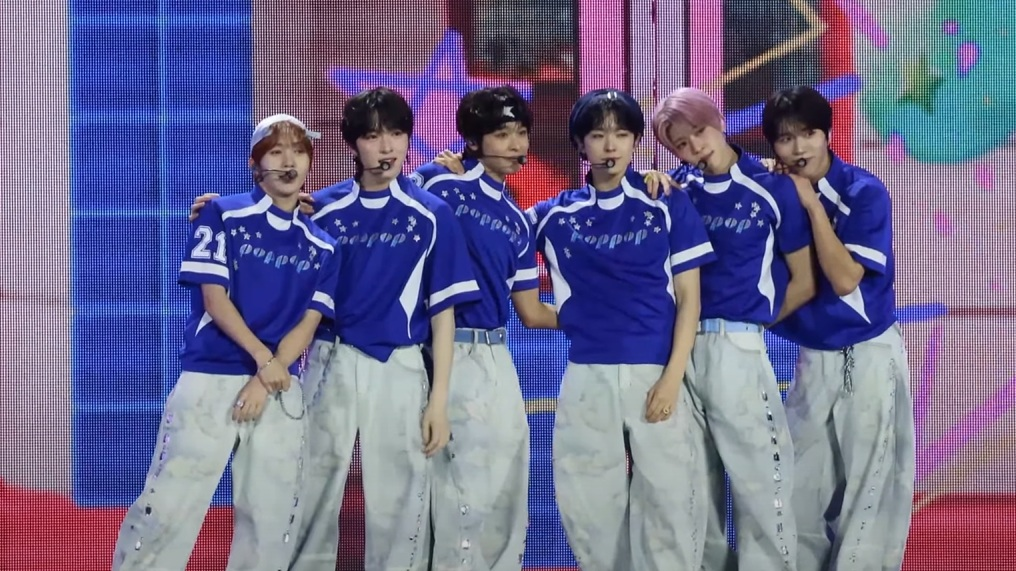
NCT Wish performing "Poppop" in April 2025

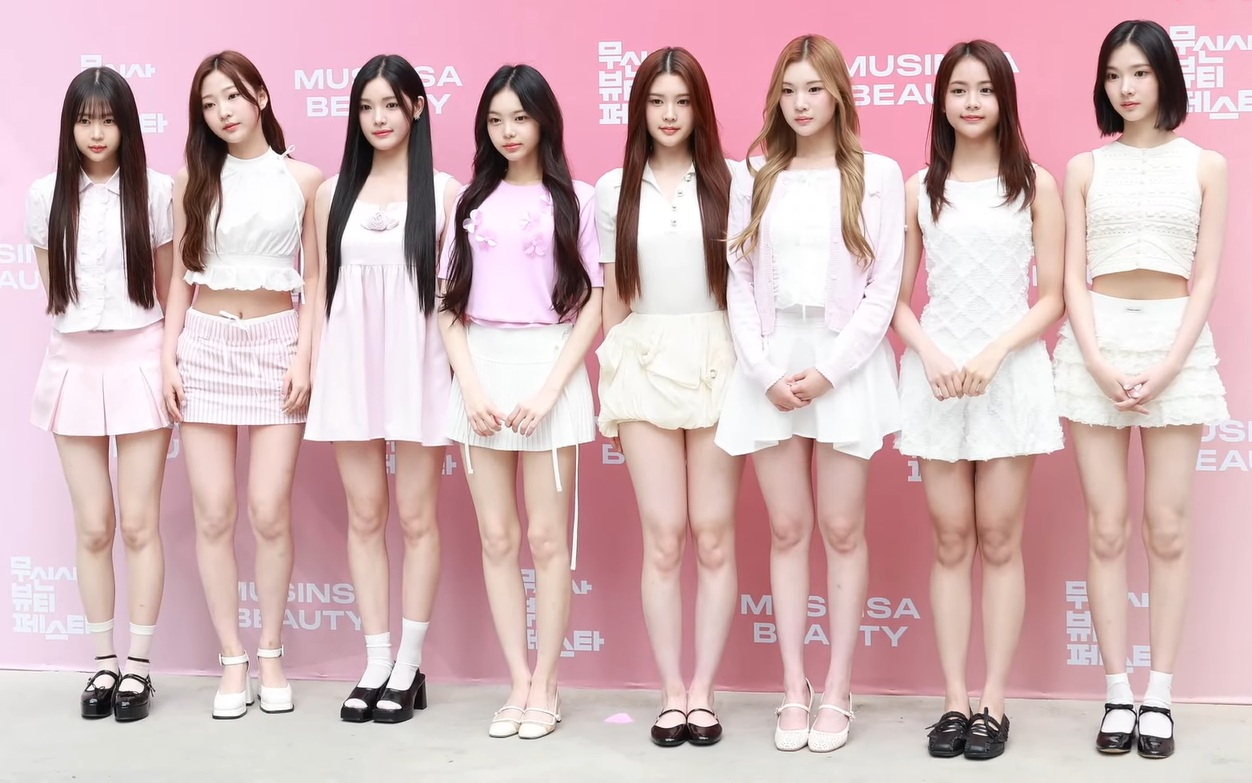
Hearts2Hearts in May 2025

On August 1, 2023, SM Entertainment announced that they would form a joint venture division with Kakao Entertainment in North America. The following day, SM announced the establishment of its music publishing subsidiary, Kreation Music Rights. SM debuted its new boy group Riize in early September, featuring former NCT members Sungchan and Shotaro. The final NCT sub-unit, NCT Wish, made their debut in February 2024. On March 18, SM's music publishing subsidiary Kreation Music Rights launched new production label Kustomade as part of SM's multi-label strategy, managing soloist Kim Woo-jin and Yelo, a member of the production team MonoTree. Hearts2Hearts, an eight-member girl group and SM's first since Aespa in 2020, debuted in February 2025.

In May 2025, SM invested in independent label Great M Entertainment, becoming the label's second largest shareholder. Hybe sold all of its remaining shares in the company to Tencent Music, with the transaction taking place on May 30. In November, SM launched a new music label called SMArt, helmed by Kangta. Yim Si-wan was the first artist signed to the label.

SM signed a memorandum of understanding with Tencent in May 2026, subsequently establishing the Beijing-based joint venture STE to manage SM's Chinese artists and eventually debut a new Chinese idol group, with Super Junior's Zhou Mi serving as its CEO.

On October 27, it was reported that Kakao Corporation was considering transferring its 21.61% stake in SM Entertainment to its subsidiary Kakao Entertainment as part of a broader restructuring of its entertainment business. Kakao Entertainment already holds a 19.89% stake in SM, which would bring its combined ownership to approximately 41.5% if the transaction proceeds.

== Board and Executive Composition ==
As of December 31, 2025, SM Entertainment was led by co-CEOs Jang Cheol-hyuk and Tak Young-jun. Its registered directors were the two co-CEOs and Choi Jung-min, while Park Ji-ho served as auditor. The board also included six outside directors. Among the unregistered executives, Lee Sung-soo served as chief administrative officer and Park Jun-young as creative fellow.

Tak Young-jun and Choi Jung-min each held approximately 10,000 shares in the company. Other executives, including Park Jun-young and Kim Ji-won, also held shares.

In March 2026, SM Entertainment appointed or reappointed three outside directors after the terms of five directors appointed in 2023 expired. Moon Jung-bin was reappointed, while Lim Jung-ha and Lee Jong-seop joined the board. All three received three-year terms. The reconstituted board had seven registered directors, including four outside directors.

=== Executive remuneration ===
At the 2025 annual general meeting, shareholders approved maximum remuneration limits of ₩6 billion (US$4.48 million) for registered directors and ₩200 million (US$149,223) for the auditor. During the reporting period, directors and the auditor received approximately ₩2.73 billion (US$2.04 million) in combined remuneration. Co-CEOs Jang Cheol-hyuk and Tak Young-jun, along with Chief Administrative Officer Lee Sung-soo, each received more than ₩500 million (US$373,057.49).

Executive remuneration was determined under the company's internal regulations and reviewed by its compensation committee. The criteria included executive positions, tenure, professional experience and performance.

The company's twelve unregistered executives received a combined ₩3.77 billion (US$2.81 million) in remuneration during the reporting period.

== Subsidiaries ==
- Dream Maker Entertainment (2006)
  - Beyond Live (2020)
- SM Brand Marketing (2008)
- SM C&C (since 2012)
- SM Town Planner (2017)
- Dear U (2017)
- KeyEast (since 2018)
- SM Life Design Group (2018)
- SM Culture Partners (2022)
- Studio Realive (2022)
- Kreation Music Rights (2023)
  - Kustomade (2024)
- Studio White (2023)

Investment

- ESteem (since 2015)
- Galaxia SM (since 2015)
- Dreamus (since 2017)

Branches

- SM Japan (2001)
- SM USA (2008)
- SM True (2011), joint venture with True Corporation of Thailand
- SM Entertainment Beijing (2012)
- SM Entertainment Indonesia (2019), joint venture with Trans Media of Indonesia
- SM Entertainment Vietnam (2020)
- SM & Kakao Entertainment America (2023)

Labels LIC stands for Labels In Company and refers to SM Entertainment's in-house label system.

- ScreaM Records: An exclusive label established in 2016 to focus on the electronic dance music genre.
- SM Classics: A classical music label established in 2020 in partnership with Seoul Philharmonic Orchestra.
- Krucialize: A contemporary R&B label established in 2024.
- SMArt: A music label established in 2025 that "reinterprets K-pop as cultural content".

Institute

- SM Institute (2021, partnership with Jongro Haneul Education)

Former labels

- Baljunso: A South Korean indie record label founded in 1991 and acquired by SM in February 2014. The label is now defunct.
- Label SJ: An exclusive label established in 2015 to manage Super Junior. It was officially shut down in March 2023 due to the group being moved to SM's new production center.
- Woollim Entertainment: A South Korean record label and entertainment company founded in 2003. In August 2013, SM acquired the label and merged it into their subsidiary SM C&C as Woollim Label. In March 2016, SM C&C decided to spin off their music content business with Woollim.
- All I Know Music (AIKM): A hip hop label founded by Mystic Story. It became part of SM in 2019 following their acquisition of Mystic Story. The label is now defunct.
- Million Market: A South Korean record label founded in 2012. It was acquired by SM in October 2018. In November 2023, SM sold its shares to Cha Ga-won, a major shareholder of BPM Entertainment.
- Mystic Story: A South Korean entertainment company founded in 2011. In March 2017, SM Entertainment acquired Mystic, becoming the label's largest shareholder. In August 2025 SM disclosed it had sold all its shares in the company.

== Disputes and legal actions ==
=== Contractual disputes ===
==== JYJ (TVXQ) ====
In late July 2009, three of the five original members of SM boy group TVXQ – Kim Jaejoong, Park Yoochun, and Kim Junsu – applied to the Seoul Central District Court to investigate the validity of their contract with SM, as they felt the thirteen-year contract was excessively long and that earnings were not fairly distributed to the members, but contract destruction, they shall be compensated to the Employer by three times the total investment amount and two times the ordinary profit during the remaining contract period. The news of this dispute caused SM's KOSPI stock price to drop by 10.06%. In addition, 120,000 fans of TVXQ filed a petition against SM's long-term contracts to the Seoul Central District Court, and also filed for compensation for an SMTown Live Concert that was canceled a week before its scheduled date.

Their statement read, "(They) have had health problems and finally reached their physical limits, but SM continued to send them abroad and plan excessive activities. Thus, the three members have started to hope they will be able to continue their careers as they wish, instead of being used as tools for the agency's profits."

The court ruled in the favour of the three ex-members. In response, SM held a press conference claiming that the lawsuit was fraudulent, and filed an injunction. In early May 2010, it was announced that Jaejoong, Yoochun, and Junsu would return to the stage as JYJ under a new management agency, C-JeS Entertainment. The injunction was dismissed by the Seoul Central District Court on February 17, 2011, and the final decision on the case was postponed indefinitely for mediation under the justice department.

On November 28, 2012, during a voluntary arbitration at the Seoul Central District Court, SM and JYJ reached a mutual agreement to terminate all contracts between the two parties and not to interfere with each other's activities in the future, concluding the lawsuit. SM reportedly stated that they had decided to end the litigation "to avoid bringing additional harm to U-Know Yunho and Max Changmin, who are active as TVXQ, and to avoid making any more unneeded issues."

==== Han Geng ====
On December 21, 2009, five months after the three former TVXQ members filed their lawsuit and while the dispute was still active, Han Geng, the only Chinese member of Super Junior, also filed a lawsuit against SM. Han Geng filed for similar reasons: unfair profit distribution, and an unfair thirteen-year contract that contained provisions in SM's favor that he was not allowed to revise or end. The artist's friend and later manager Sun Le also submitted a statement to the Korean courts citing SM's violation of Han Geng's rights, which was later leaked via the internet. The statement argued that SM had discriminated against Han Geng financially as well as in terms of management.

On September 27, 2011, Han Geng's departure from Super Junior was made official when legal representatives of both Han Geng and SM released a joint statement saying that "Han Geng and SM Entertainment have amicably settled on a mutual agreement, and the lawsuit was able to come to a close after Han Geng submitted his 'Notice of Withdrawal of Appeal.'"

==== Kris Wu ====
On May 15, 2014, Kris Wu, a Canadian member of Exo, filed a lawsuit to terminate his contract with SM, as first reported by Chinese news portal Sina. He was represented by Cho Bum-suk, the same lawyer that handled Han Geng's case. Kris, whose real name is Wu Yifan, was quoted as saying, "The company has treated me like a machine part or as an object of control rather than presenting a vision as an entertainer." He left the group in the same month that the lawsuit was made public, while the rest of the group continued to promote their single "Overdose." On July 21, 2016, Kris officially parted ways with EXO, although his contract with SM remained valid until 2022.

==== Jessica Jung ====
On September 29, 2014, Girls' Generation member Jessica Jung claimed in a Weibo post that she had been forced out of the group, writing:

I was excited about our upcoming fan events only to shockingly be informed by my company and 8 others that as of today, I'm no longer a member. I'm devastated – my priority and love is to serve as a member of GG, but for no justifiable reason, I am being forced out.

The following day, Jung released a statement claiming that in August 2014, her fellow group members and SM had been positive about the launch of her fashion business, Blanc and Eclare. As of early September, she claimed, they had all changed their stance, and she was directed to either close the business or cease promotions as a member of Girls' Generation. She claimed to have received the day before a "one-sided notice" asking her to leave the group.

However, according to SM, Jung had unilaterally informed them in early spring that she would leave the group after one more album. But before agreements could be made, she had set up her independent business, which caused problems for the group's professional schedules. This prompted management to begin promoting Girls' Generation as eight members rather than nine, with the intention of announcing the news; however, Jung had already "posted her own perspective". The company then stated that the group would henceforth continue as eight, while they would still manage Jung's individual schedule. In the days immediately after this news came to light, company stocks dropped by KR₩3,350 per share, from KR₩40,750 to KR₩37,400, losing SM a total of KR₩69 billion (approximately US$65 million).

On August 6, 2015, Jung and SM reached an agreement to terminate her contract, with Jung stating, "This release is to confirm that SM Entertainment ('SM') and I have officially parted ways. I will cherish the many years we spent and I wish SM the best of luck in all of its endeavors."

==== Lu Han ====
On October 10, 2014, Lu Han became the second Chinese member of Exo to file to nullify his contract with SM and leave the group, just over four months after Kris had done the same. His lawsuit included the claim that SM had favored the Korean sub-unit Exo-K over the Chinese sub-unit Exo-M. Within 15 minutes of the announcement, company stocks had dropped by 9.41%, from KR₩37,000 to KR₩33,250 per share. The stock's worth contracted by 15%, hitting the maximum decrease in price KOSDAQ allows for a day, and falling to a more-than-one-year low. On July 21, 2016, Lu Han officially parted ways with Exo, although his contract with SM remained valid until 2022.

==== No Min-woo ====
In April 2015, No Min-woo, a former member of TRAX, filed a lawsuit against SM for subjecting him to an unlawful seventeen-year contract. No alleged that SM had also interfered with his career after he had left the company, and sought KR₩100 million in damages. No lost his lawsuit against SM on July 21, 2016.

==== Huang Zitao ====
On August 24, 2015, Tao became the third Chinese member of Exo to file against SM and leave the group, being represented by the same legal team that represented former members Kris and Lu Han. On January 5, 2016, SM won one of its counter-lawsuits against Tao per the ruling of the Intermediate People's Court in Qingdao, China. The agency sued Tao over his failure to repay the company after his departure. They released an official statement saying, "SM has ongoing lawsuits against Exo members Wu Yifan (Kris), Luhan, and Tao for violating their exclusive contracts and partaking in illegal promotions in China. Among these lawsuits, SM filed a lawsuit against Tao for failing to repay SM on October 13, 2015. An intermediate court in Qingdao, China made the verdict that Tao is to repay SM as well as interest for the delayed payment."

==== Chen, Baekhyun, and Xiumin ====
On June 1, 2023, Chen, Baekhyun, and Xiumin from Exo simultaneously ended their exclusive contacts with SM and took legal action against the company on the grounds of overdue payment and unreasonable deals. All three stated that they had requested clear and calculated records of their earnings; however, SM allegedly failed to disclose this information to them. Additionally, their legal representative, law firm LIN, stated that the company forced their artists to sign exclusive contracts lasting between 12 and 13 years, then demanded that artists renew their contracts to last for a total of 17–18 years. The three believed that SM was exerting their power to force their artists into unfair "slave contracts" which violated existing laws regarding the entertainment industry. They therefore chose to pursue legal action against SM to act as a voice for other artists in the industry. On June 19, SM Entertainment and Exo members Chen, Baekhyun, and Xiumin jointly announced that both parties had resolved their differences over the contract dispute with the members deciding to stay with the agency, which was described as a "misunderstanding."

Baekhyun would go on to establish INB100 Entertainment, with Chen and Xiumin joining shortly after. Despite the move, INB100 clarified that the three members would continue their activities as part of Exo, alongside the other members of the group. Later, One Hundred, a global production company, officially announced the acquisition of INB100 as its newest subsidiary, following the previous acquisitions of Million Market and Big Planet Made Entertainment, on the 16th. Following the release of Xiumin's second solo EP, Interview X, under the new label on March 10, 2025, the artist was reportedly informed by national broadcaster KBS that he would not be allowed to appear on programs featuring SM's artists, including the highly popular music show Music Bank. On March 4, 2025, One Hundred, the parent company of INB100, released a statement condemning the decision. The label criticized KBS for blocking Xiumin's participation in music programs, stating that the decision was not based on musical reasons but rather on the broadcaster's relationship with SM Entertainment.

Though it was difficult for us to understand the reasoning, we continued, until today, to reach out to KBS, urging the broadcaster to think about the artist and the fans. However, [such requests] have been disregarded. We believe that KBS, a state-run broadcasting station, is obstructing the opportunity of our musician to connect with his fans, solely due to the broadcasting station's relationship with a "particular entertainment company," rather than for other reasonable issues related to his music. We believe that it is highly unfair for the public broadcaster KBS to have made such a decision, while only reflecting the position of a "specific company." We deeply regret having to share this disappointing news with the fans.

KBS dismissed One Hundred's claims as "completely untrue", stating that there was no official decision to prevent Xiumin from appearing on Music Bank or other programs. In response, One Hundred retaliated by withdrawing its artists from KBS programs on Thursday. This included singer Lee Mu-jin, who was set to appear on the KBS YouTube music show LeeMujin Service, and comedian Lee Soo-geun, who was scheduled for KBS Joy's talk show Unpredictable Fortunetellers.

=== 2009 MAMA Awards boycott ===
On November 21, 2009, SM boycotted the Mnet Asian Music Awards event, claiming reservations regarding the standard of fairness and the criteria used in Mnet's selections for award recipients. The company specifically mentioned Girls' Generation, who had topped Korean music charts for nine consecutive weeks and had won numerous awards for their single "Gee", but had never won on Mnet's weekly M Countdown show, and had only appeared on their charts a month after the album release. SM also cited the fact that voters had to pay a fee, saying that they "did not want to see fans suffer any damage from the poll, which has commercial intentions."

=== Fair Trade Commission scrutiny ===
==== Artist contracts ====
In 2010, the Korea Fair Trade Commission (KFTC) undertook an investigation into SM's policies, especially regarding artists' contract terms, and concluded that they were unfair. Artist contracts were subsequently reduced by a length of three years, and there was a reduction in the penalties for breach-of-contract violations. All the artists signed under SM at the time re-contracted with the agency under the new terms.

==== Price rig ====
SM was also one of fifteen companies sued and fined by the KFTC for price rigging in 2011.

In 2012, SM was accused of colluding with music distributors, but was cleared of the charge. On August 16, the Seoul High Court revealed their verdict on the issue: "The KFTC has canceled all corrective orders against SM, and the lawsuit costs will be paid by the defendant."

==== Unfair sales practices ====
In July 2023, the Korea Fair Trade Commission launched an investigation into several entertainment agencies, including SM Entertainment, over suspicions of engaging in unfair photocard sale practices. The case involved entertainment agencies creating multiple different merchandise items and inserting photocards of their idols to influence buyers' purchasing decisions. Additionally, these agencies manipulated production supplies, encouraging fans to purchase large quantities of merchandise.

== Philanthropy ==
On February 13, 2023, SM donated 200 million won to help in 2023 Turkey–Syria earthquake through Hope Bridge National Disaster Relief Association.

In November 2025, SM pledged HK$1 million (US$128,000) to the Hong Kong Red Cross to aid firefighting, rescue and relief efforts following the 2025 Tai Po apartment fire.
