= I-Will =

2026 concert tour by Irene

- Asia tour by Irene
- Promotional poster of the tour in Seoul, South Korea
- Location: Asia
- Associated album: Biggest Fan
- Start date: May 23, 2026
- End date: July 18, 2026
- Legs: 1
- No. of shows: 7

I-Will is the first solo concert tour by South Korean singer Irene. The tour follows the release of her first studio album, Biggest Fan, on March 30, 2026.

== Background ==
The tour was announced in March 2026 through the official Red Velvet social media platforms. This marks Irene's first solo concert tour after being a member of Red Velvet and her previous work as a part of the sub-unit Red Velvet – Irene & Seulgi. The Seoul concerts, which open the tour, took place for two days, from May 23 to 24, at the Jangchung Arena.

== Set list ==
The following set list is from the concert on May 23, 2026, in Seoul, South Korea, and is not intended to represent all shows throughout the tour.

1. "Like a Flower"
2. "Best Believe"
3. "MTV (My Timeless Video)"
4. "Summer Rain"
5. "Face to Face"
6. "Strawberry Silhouette"
7. "Calling Me Back"
8. "Black Halo"
9. "Spit It Out"
10. "Don't Wanna Get Up"
11. "Million Miles Away"
12. "A White Night"
13. "I Feel Pretty"
14. "The Only"
15. "Ka-Ching"
16. "Biggest Fan"
17. "Wasteland"
18. "Love Can Make a Way"

Encore:

19. "Attaboy"
20. "Red Dress"
21. "Rookie"
22. "Russian Roulette"
23. "Winter Wish"
24. "Start Line"

== Tour dates ==
List of concert dates
Date	City	Country	Venue	Attendance
May 23	Seoul	South Korea	Jangchung Arena	TBA
May 24	Seoul	South Korea	Jangchung Arena	TBA
June 6	Taipei	Taiwan	National Taiwan University Sports Center	TBA
June 7	Taipei	Taiwan	National Taiwan University Sports Center	TBA
June 20	Macau	China	Studio City Event Center	TBA
July 4	Singapore		The Theatre at Mediacorp	TBA
July 18	Bangkok	Thailand	MCC Hall Bangkae	TBA
