= Biggest Fan =

Biggest Fan may refer to:

- The Biggest Fan, a 2002 British film by Michael Criscione and Michael Meyer starring Chris Trousdale from the boy band Dream Street
- The Biggest Fan (2022 film), a 2022 French comedy film
- "Biggest Fan" (Call Me No One song), 2012
- Biggest Fan (album), by Irene, 2026
  - "Biggest Fan" (Irene song)
- "Biggest Fan", a 2012 song by American singer Chris Brown from his fifth studio album Fortune
- "Biggest Fan", a 2023 song by Asteria and d3r
- Your Biggest Fan (EP), a 2006 EP by indie pop band Voxtrot
- "Your Biggest Fan" (song), a 2026 song by The Vampire Lestat
- "Your Biggest Fan", a 2010 song by American singer Nick Jonas from the 2010 soundtrack Jonas L.A.

== See also ==
- Stan (fan), a term for an overly-obsessed fan
- Fan (person), a fanatic or an admirer who is enthusiastically fixated over a thing or a famous person
- Fandom
