= Biggest Fan (album) =

- Digital cover

Studio album by Irene
- Released: March 30, 2026
- Length: 30:11
- Language: Korean
- Labels: SM; Kakao

Irene chronology
Like a Flower (2024)	Biggest Fan (2026)

Singles from Biggest Fan
- 1. "Biggest Fan" Released: March 30, 2026

Biggest Fan is the first studio album by South Korean singer Irene. It was released by SM Entertainment on March 30, 2026, and contains ten tracks, including the lead single of the same name.

== Background and release ==
On February 27, 2026, SM Entertainment announced that Irene would be releasing her first studio album in March 2026. On March 9, it was announced that Biggest Fan would be released on March 30. It will contain ten tracks, including the lead single of the same name. A day later, the promotional schedule was released. On March 24, the highlight medley was released. Three days later, the music video teaser for "Biggest Fan" was released. The album was released alongside the music video for "Biggest Fan" on March 30.

An accompanying Asia tour, titled I-Will, was announced on March 25, 2026. The tour comprised seven dates across five countries from May to July 2026.

== Composition ==
Biggest Fan contains ten tracks. The lead single, "Biggest Fan", is a pop dance song characterized by an "upbeat groove bass" with lyrics "delivering the message of becoming each other's fans and cheering for one another with a cheerful and confident attitude". The track, "Face to Face", is a R&B pop song with lyrics "depicting the process of acknowledging and accepting oneself as one is rather than trying to change one's appearance". The track, "Million Miles Away", is a pop dance song featuring "retro mood, synth sounds, and upbeat rhythm" with lyrics "capturing a sense of freedom, depict the moments of escaping from daily life and venturing into unfamiliar places". The track, "Black Halo", is a medium-tempo R&B pop song characterized by "keyboard sounds and gospel harmonies" with monologue lyrics about "the moment of letting go of vain expectations and hopes". The track, "Best Believe", is a R&B pop song featuring "hip-hop style rhythms" with lyrics "conveying a message of moving forward with anticipation for the days ahead".

The track, "Love Can Make a Way", is band pop song with lyrics about "an autobiographical story of how the present self realizes the ultimate power of love through the comfort conveyed by the past self and seeks to repay herself". The track, "My Timeless Video", is a retro-inspired R&B pop song with lyrics about "[Irene] recalling the joyful memories of the past shared with fans and convey a meaningful and sincere sentiment to continue the precious relationship with them unchangingly". The track, "Don't Wanna Get Up", is a house-based electropop song characterized by "subtle synth sounds" with lyrics about "the story of a speaker who has experienced a state of transcendence, one that goes beyond limits and is not bound by any emotions". The track, "Spit It Out", is a pop dance song featuring "bass and strings" with lyrics "suggesting that it is okay to honestly express negative emotions". The track, "Wasteland", is a pop song with lyrics "depicting a journey to an ideal space where one can exist just as they are" conveying the message of "determination to move forward while cherishing the comfort found there".

== Track listing ==
Biggest Fan track listing
No.	Title	Lyrics	Music	Arrangement	Length
1.	"Biggest Fan"	Liljune	Evan Gartner; Grace Baer; Samuel Preston	Evan Gartner	2:48
2.	"Best Believe"	Kim In-hyung (Jam Factory)	Emile Ghantous; Jackson Hirsh; Kevin Randolph; Eva Honey; Meg Donnelly	Emile Ghantous; Jackson Hirsh	2:45
3.	"Don't Wanna Get Up"	Jang Jeong-won (Jam Factory)	Chloe Angelides; Alex Chapman; Oliver "German" Peterhof	Oliver "German" Peterhof	3:00
4.	"Face to Face"	Lee Seu-ran	Anders Nilsen; Kristin Marie; Magnus Clausen; Mathilde Nyegaard	Anders Nilsen	3:24
5.	"Million Miles Away"	Geumto (153/Joombas)	Jacob Manson; Vincent J. van den Ende; Conor Blake; Melodie	Jacob Manson; Vincent J. van den Ende	2:55
6.	"Love Can Make a Way"	Yorkie	Humbler; Davey Nate; Higherbaby; Jayna Brown	Humbler	3:28
7.	"Spit It Out"	Na Jeong-ah (153/Joombas)	Ella Boh; Cxloe; Liv Miraldi; Niko Mohr; Joshua Linne	FriendsFromCollege	2:56
8.	"Black Halo"	Oh Hyun-sun (Lalala Studio)	Kristin Carpenter; Rasmus Budny; Gustav Nyström	Rasmus Budny; Gustav Nyström	2:45
9.	"MTV (My Timeless Video)"	Danke; Moon Ji-young (Lalala Studio)	Sean Fischer; 3nrique; Young Chance; Wilhelmina	Sean Fischer	3:02
10.	"Wasteland"	Ku Tae-woo (Jam Factory); Yoo So-hyun (Lalala Studio); Sabi	Elias Edman; Jacob Werner; Hanna Jäger; Phoebe Ryan	Elias Edman; Jacob Werner	3:08
Total length:					30:11

== Credits and personnel ==
Credits adapted from the album's liner notes.

Studio

- SM Aube Studio – recording (track 1, 3–4, 6–9), digital editing (track 1, 4)
- SM Wavelet Studio – recording (track 1)
- SM Droplet Studio – recording (track 2), digital editing (track 3)
- SM Dorii Studio – recording (track 4, 10), digital editing (track 2, 5–6, 9–10), engineered for mix (track 6, 9)
- SM Yellow Tail Studio – recording (track 5), digital editing (track 8–9)
- SM Azure Studio – recording (track 10)
- Doobdoob Studio – digital editing (track 2–3)
- SM Big Shot Studio – digital editing, engineered for mix (track 7), mixing (track 7, 9)
- SM Blue Ocean Studio – mixing (track 1–2)
- SM Starlight Studio – mixing (track 3, 5)
- SM Blue Cup Studio – mixing (track 4, 8)
- SM Concert Hall Studio – mixing (track 6, 10)
- 821 Sound – mastering (all tracks)

Personnel

- SM Entertainment – executive producer
- Irene – vocals (all tracks), background vocals (track 1–3, 5, 7–10)
- Liljune – lyrics (track 1)
- Evan Gartner – composition, arrangement (track 1)
- Grace Baer – composition, background vocals (track 1)
- Samuel Preston – composition (track 1)
- Kim In-hyung (Jam Factory) – lyrics (track 2)
- Emile Ghantous – composition, arrangement (track 2)
- Jackson Hirsh a.k.a. Rence – composition, arrangement (track 2)
- Kevin Randolph – composition (track 2)
- Eva Honey – composition (track 2)
- Meg Donnelly – composition (track 2)
- Jang Jung-won (Jam Factory) – lyrics (track 3)
- Chloe Angelides – composition (track 3)
- Alex Chapman – composition (track 3)
- Oliver "German" Peterhof – composition, arrangement (track 3)
- Lee Seu-ran – lyrics (track 4)
- Anders Nilsen – composition, arrangement (track 4)
- Kristin Marie – composition, background vocals (track 4)
- Magnus Clausen – composition (track 4)
- Mathilde Nyegaard – composition, background vocals (track 4)
- Geumto (153/Joombas) – lyrics (track 5)
- Jacob Manson – composition, arrangement, drums, bass, keyboard, programming (track 5)
- Vincent J. van den Ende a.k.a. Avedon – composition, arrangement, drums, bass, keyboard, programming (track 5)
- Conor Blake – composition (track 5)
- Melodie – composition (track 5)
- Yorkie – lyrics (track 6)
- Humbler – composition, arrangement (track 6)
  - Park Joo-hoon – drums (track 6)
  - Seo Sang-hwan – bass (track 6)
  - Jung Yeon-soo – synthesizer (track 6)
- Davey Nate – composition (track 6)
- Higherbaby – composition (track 6)
- Jayna Brown – composition (track 6)
- Na Jung-ah (153/Joombas) – lyrics (track 7)
- Ella Boh – composition (track 7)
- Cxloe – composition, background vocals (track 7)
- Liv Miraldi – composition (track 7)
- Niko Mohr (FriendsFromCollege) – composition, arrangement (track 7)
- Joshua Linne (FriendsFromCollege) – composition, arrangement, background vocals (track 7)
- Oh Hyun-sun (Lalala Studio) – lyrics (track 8)
- Kristin Carpenter – composition, background vocals (track 8)
- Rasmus Budny – composition, arrangement (track 8)
- Gustav Nyström – composition, arrangement (track 8)
- Danke – lyrics (track 9)
- Moon Ji-young (Lalala Studio) – lyrics (track 9)
- Sean Fischer – composition, arrangement (track 9)
- 3nrique – composition (track 9)
- Young Chance – composition (track 9)
- Wilhelmina – composition (track 9)
- Koo Tae-woo (Jam Factory) – lyrics (track 10)
- Yoo So-hyun (Lalala Studio) – lyrics (track 10)
- Sabi – lyrics (track 10)
- Elias Edman – composition, arrangement (track 10)
- Jacob Werner – composition, arrangement (track 10)
- Hanna Jäger – composition, background vocals (track 10)
- Phoebe Ryan – composition (track 10)
- Kenzie – vocal directing (track 1)
- Ondine – vocal directing (track 2, 10)
- MinGtion – vocal directing (track 3–4, 9)
- Une – background vocals (track 4)
- Sam Carter – vocal directing, Pro Tools operating (track 5)
- Joowon – vocal directing (track 6–8)
- Jsong – background vocals (track 6)
- Kriz – background vocals (track 7)
- G-high – vocal directing (track 8)
- Ikki – background vocals (track 9)
- Kim Nam-woong – guitar (track 6)
- Jo Hyun-jin – piano (track 6)
- Kim Hyo-joon – recording (track 1, 3–4, 6–9), digital editing (track 1, 4)
- Kang Eun-ji – recording (track 1)
- Kim Joo-hyun – recording (track 2), digital editing (track 3)
- Jeong Jae-won – recording (track 4, 10), digital editing (track 2, 5–6, 9–10), engineered for mix (track 6, 9)
- Kim Jae-yeon – recording (track 10)
- Eugene Kwon – digital editing (track 2–3)
- Noh Min-ji – digital editing (track 8–9)
- Lee Min-kyu – recording (track 5), digital editing, engineered for mix (track 7), mixing (track 7, 9)
- Kim Cheol-sun – mixing (track 1–2)
- Jeong Yoo-ra – mixing (track 3, 5)
- Jung Eui-seok – mixing (track 4, 8)
- Nam Koong-jin – mixing (track 6, 10)
- Kwon Nam-woo – mastering (all tracks)

== Charts ==
Chart performance for Biggest Fan
Chart (2026)	Peak position
Japanese Albums (Oricon)	34
Japanese Top Albums Sales (Billboard Japan)	31
South Korean Albums (Circle)	1

== Publication lists ==
Publication lists for "Biggest Fan"
Critic/Publication	List	Rank	Ref.
Billboard	The 25 Best K-Pop Albums of 2026 (So Far): Critic's Picks	23	

== Release history ==
Release history for Biggest Fan
Region	Date	Format	Label
South Korea	March 30, 2026	CD	SM; Kakao
Various	March 30, 2026	Digital download; streaming	SM; Kakao
