= Irene's Work & Holiday =

2022 South Korean reality web series

- Irene's Work & Holiday main poster
- Hangul: 아이린의 워크 & 홀리데이
- RR: Airinui wokeu & hollidei
- MR: Airinŭi wŏk'ŭ & hollidei
- Genre: Reality show
- Directed by: Jin Sun-mi
- Starring: Irene
- Original language: Korean
- No. of episodes: 8

Production
- Production company: SM C&C Studio

Original release
- Network: Seezn; Sig
- Release: August 4, 2022

Irene's Work & Holiday (Korean: 아이린의 워크&홀리데이) is a South Korean reality web series starring Irene. Produced by SM C&C Studio and directed by Jin Sun-mi, the reality show was broadcast on Seezn and Sig started on August 4, 2022, and was shown every Thursday and Friday. It served as Irene's first solo reality show that featured her life as a Red Velvet member, her daily life, and going on a vacation with her staffs.

== Production and synopsis ==
On July 25, 2022, the production of Irene's Work and Holiday with SM C&C Studio, directed by Jin Sun-mi, was announced along with the release of a concept poster. The reality show started on August 4 through Seezn Original and Sig broadcasts and featured Red Velvet member Irene. It will be her first solo reality show through over-the-top (OTT) media service, Seezn, and will showcase Irene as a group member and Bae Joo-hyun, a human being who went on vacation with friends from the beginning of her debut. By July 28, the main poster for the show was released featuring her two daily lives. The show was released every Thursday and Friday at 6:00 PM KST (UTC+09:00) starting from August 4 through the OTT.

On July 29, the main teaser for the show was released which demonstrated her thorough checking of the stage set before the group's performance, practicing the choreography in her spare time, and spending her holiday trip. The production team stated to anticipate Irene's "comfortable and unpretentious" appearance on vacation with her staffs, who had been with her schedules and daily life for almost seven to eight years since her debut. Additionally, they added that they captured singer Irene's backstage and human Bae Joo-hyun's "unexpected" turn-off time up-close while meeting her two sides at the same time. The show was also set to deliver Irene's "honest" passion and sincerity for her daily life and work. Moreover, it was set to unfold Irene's professional daily life in her way, the new aspects of her travels, and her appearance that she has never shown before.

== Episodes ==
No.	Title	Original release date
1	"IRENE's Work&Holiday EP.01"	August 4, 2022
2	"IRENE's Work&Holiday EP.02"	August 5, 2022
3	"IRENE's Work&Holiday EP.03"	August 11, 2022
4	"IRENE's Work&Holiday EP.04"	August 12, 2022
5	"IRENE's Work&Holiday EP.05"	August 18, 2022
6	"IRENE's Work&Holiday EP.06"	August 19, 2022
7	"IRENE's Work&Holiday EP.07"	August 25, 2022
8	"IRENE's Work&Holiday EP.08"	August 26, 2022

== Reception ==
Stock prices of SM Culture & Contents (SM C&C) increased as its trading volume soared. At 12:24 PM KST (UTC+09:00) on August 3, 2022, SM C&C's trading volume was 4.41,220 shares by 1175.22% from 374,503 shares the previous day. The rise in stock prices was believed to reflect anticipations for Irene's Work & Holiday reality show, produced by SM C&C Studio.
