= Haknam High School =

High school in South Korea

Coordinates: 35°56′47″N 128°34′08″E

- Korean: 학남고등학교

Information
- School type: High school
- Established: 2003; 23 years ago
- Teaching staff: c.70
- Enrollment: c.1200

Haknam High School (Korean: 학남고등학교; Hanja: 鶴南高等學校) is a public high school in Daegu, South Korea.

== History ==
The plan to establish the school was approved on 8 November 2001, and the establishment process was completed on 4 March 2003 when the first entrance ceremony was held.

== Symbol ==
The symbol tree of the school is a pine. This shows four meanings: the tree that has lived with people, stability and flexibility together, tough willingness and a brave heart, fidelity and integrity. Alongside this, the symbol flower is the plum blossom and also has four meanings: stability, willingness, resolute and lofty elegance, purity and nobility, attractive scent is that.

== Notable alumni ==
- Bae Joo-hyun (stage name: Irene), member of girl group Red Velvet
