= Irene (singer) =

South Korean singer (born 1991)

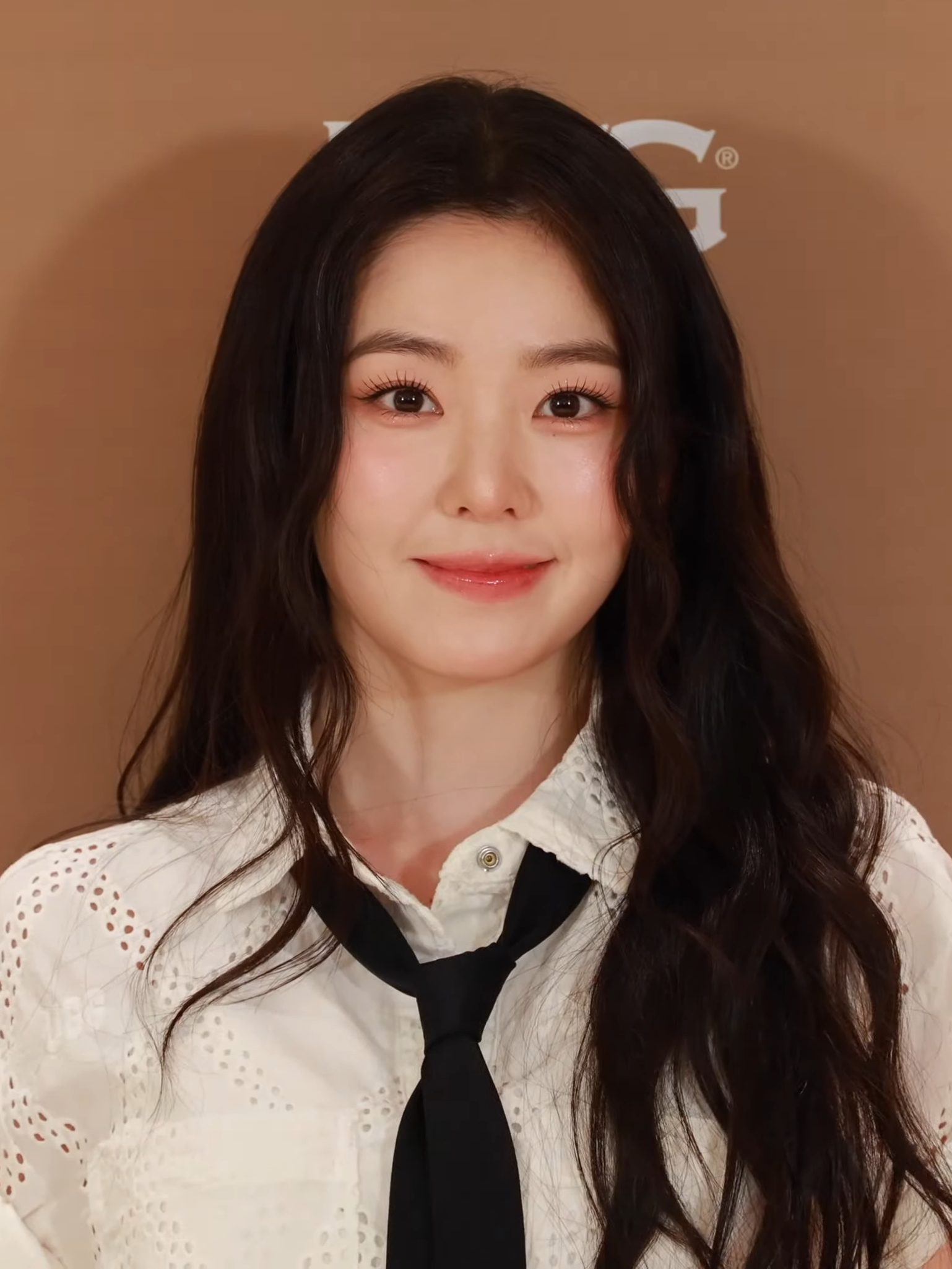
- Irene in 2025
- Born: Bae Joo-hyun; March 29, 1991 (age 35); Daegu, South Korea
- Education: Haknam High School
- Occupations: Singer; actress
- Years active: 2014–present
- Musical career
- Genre: K-pop
- Instrument: Vocals
- Label: SM
- Member of: Red Velvet; Red Velvet – Irene & Seulgi
- Formerly of: SM Rookies
- Website: Official website

Korean name
- Hangul: 배주현
- Hanja: 裴柱現
- RR: Bae Juhyeon
- MR: Pae Chuhyŏn

Signature
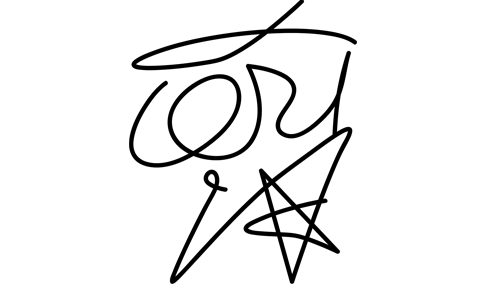

Bae Joo-hyun (Korean: 배주현; born March 29, 1991), better known by her stage name Irene (아이린), is a South Korean singer, actress and rapper. She is best known as a member and the leader of the South Korean girl group Red Velvet, and its sub-unit Red Velvet – Irene & Seulgi.

Irene hosted the television programs Music Bank (2015–2016), Laundry Day (2016–2017), and Irene's Work & Holiday (2022), as well as various music festivals and award events. As an actress, Irene has starred in Women at a Game Company (2016) and Double Patty (2021).

== Early life and education ==
Irene was born Bae Joo-hyun on March 29, 1991, in Daegu, South Korea. She grew up in Buk-gu. Her family consists of her parents and a younger sibling. She attended Haknam High School in Daegu.

== Career ==
=== 2009–2014: Career beginnings ===
She joined SM Entertainment in 2009 and trained for five years.

During her time as a trainee, in August 2013, she appeared in the music video of her then-labelmate Henry Lau's song "1-4-3".

On December 9, 2013, Irene was one of the second batch of trainees introduced as a member of SM Rookies, a pre-debut team of trainees under SM Entertainment, alongside former trainee Lami and now-NCT member Jaehyun.

During SM Rookies, in January 2014, she alongside Seulgi as well as now-NCT members Johnny and Taeyong appeared in The Celebrity magazine. In February 2014, Irene, Seulgi and Taeyong appeared in the OhBoy! magazine.

Various clips of Irene were released in SM Entertainment's official YouTube channel, "SMTOWN", one of which included her and Seulgi dancing to "Be Natural", a song originally performed by SM Entertainment's group S.E.S., showcasing their dancing on July 17, 2014.

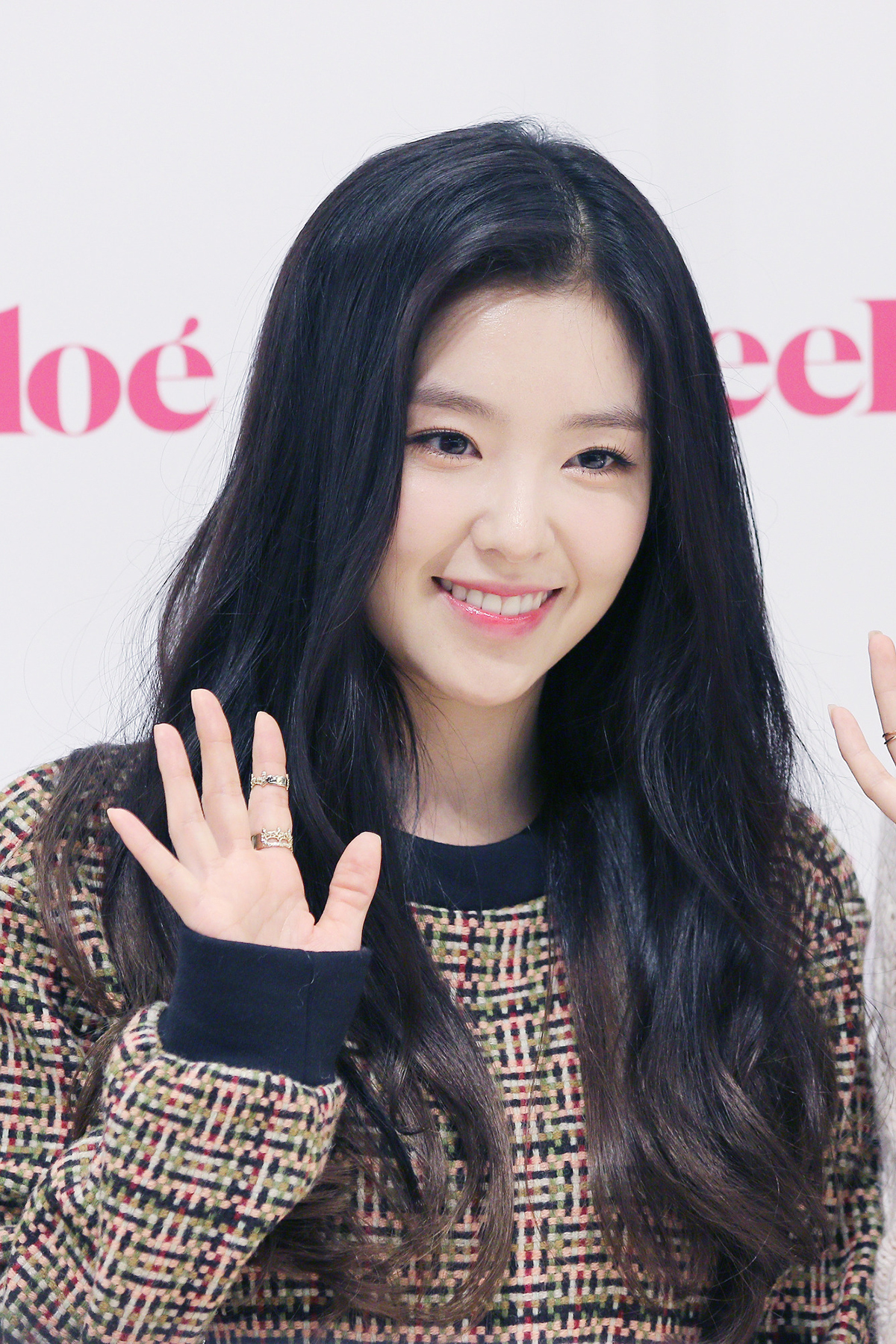
Irene in October 2014

On July 27, 2014, she was introduced as a member and the leader of the girl group Red Velvet. They made their official debut with the single "Happiness". Since then, Red Velvet has released eleven EPs and two studio albums as well as two reissue albums. They have become regarded as one of the most popular K-pop groups in South Korea and worldwide. In November 2014, Irene appeared in the music video of Kyuhyun's ballad single "광화문에서 (At Gwanghwamun)".

=== 2015–present: Solo activities and sub-unit ===
From May 2015 to June 2016, Irene hosted the music show Music Bank with actor Park Bo-gum. They both gained attention for their chemistry as well as singing and hosting skills. The press called them one of the best partnerships in the show's history.

In July 2016, Irene made her acting debut in the web drama Women at a Game Company where she played the female lead. In the same month, Irene was cast in Hello! Our Language, a sitcom that was set on teaching viewers proper Korean, and she played as detective. On October 14, Irene became a host of OnStyle's fashion show Laundry Day. The show premiered on October 22, 2016. In the same month, she became a panelist on the KBS show Trick & True with bandmate Wendy. In March 2017, Irene partnered with actor Kim Min-jae for the portrayal of two lovers in the MV of Red Velvet's SM Station ID "Would U".

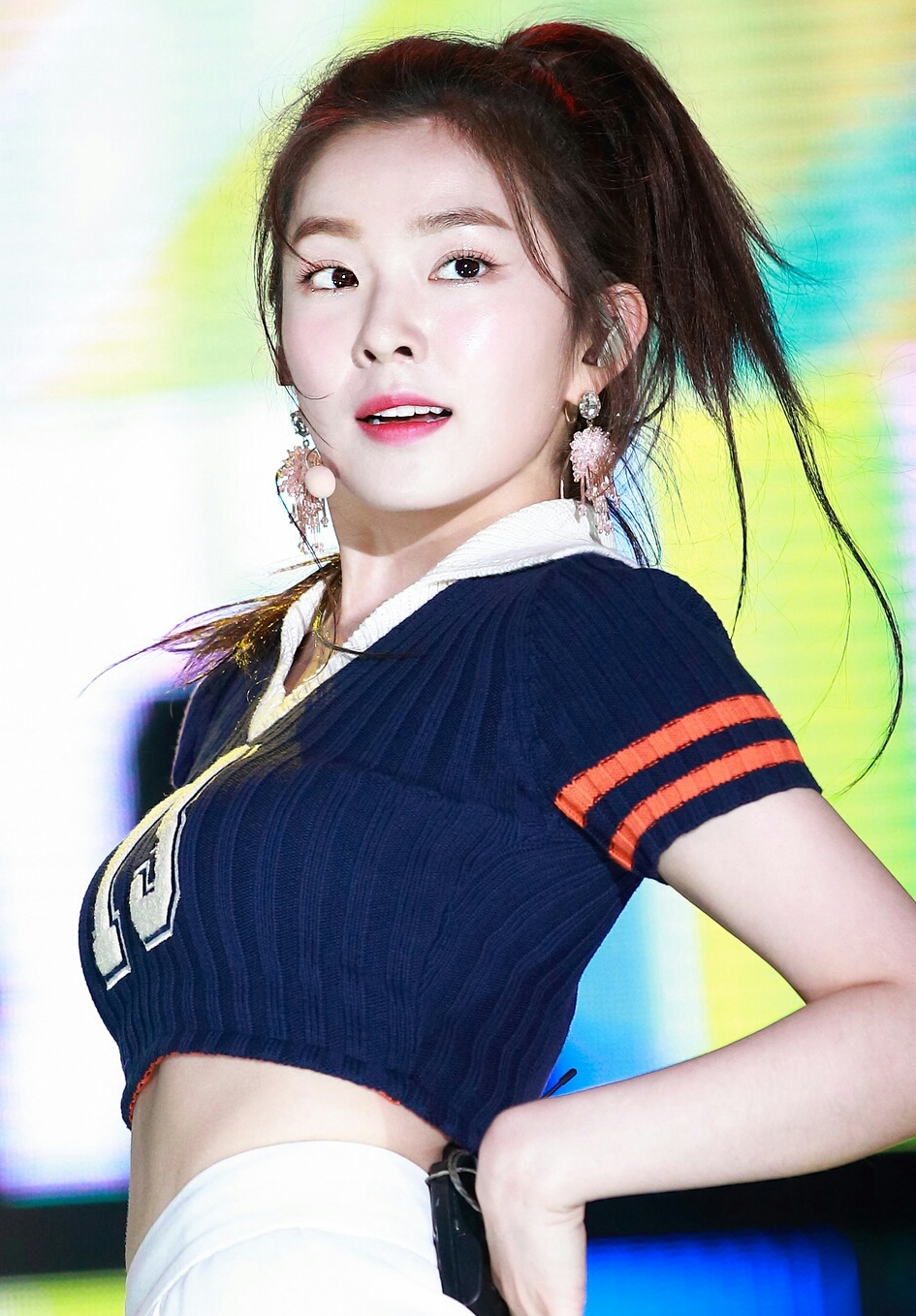
Irene performing in 2018

In July 2019, SM Entertainment announced that Irene would be collaborating with South Korean DJ and producer Raiden on the track "The Only", which was released on August 2.

On April 20, 2020, SM confirmed that Irene, alongside member Seulgi, would form Red Velvet's first sub-unit. Red Velvet - Irene & Seulgi debuted on July 6 with the extended play Monster. A short solo performance MV of her, titled Episode 2: Irene, was also released. She and Seulgi also starred in a spin-off version of their reality show Level Up Project! On July 16, SM confirmed that Irene would be acting in the upcoming film Double Patty, which was to be released later on that year, but it was later postponed to February 2021. She is to play the role of Lee Hyun-Ji, an aspiring anchor. Irene also released her own OST, titled "A White Night", for the movie.

On April 3, 2024, it was announced that Irene will hold her first photo exhibition. It will be held from April 26 to May 5 in Gangnam, Seoul, with free entrance. She will simultaneously release three versions (namely Tabloid, Photobook, and Exclusive) of her photobook titled "1 Page of Irene" on the first day of the exhibition along with a new single titled "I Feel Pretty". The song was previously teased at her birthday event Irene In Wonderland 2024 held on March 29.

On November 4, 2024, it was announced that Irene would be releasing her debut EP Like a Flower, with the lead single of the same name, on November 26.

On March 8, 2026, it was announced that Irene would be releasing her first studio album Biggest Fan, with the lead single of the same name, on March 30.

== Other activities ==
=== Endorsements ===
Irene has been hailed a "CF Queen" due to her huge marketing power and numerous endorsement deals ranging from cosmetics, luxury apparel items, and up to basic commodities. Besides her endorsements with Red Velvet as a group, she also became a model for Ivy Club together with labelmates Exo in 2015. In 2016, she became an endorser of coffee brand Maxwell House. In January 2017, Irene became the new brand model for Nuovo Shoes. In August 2017, Irene was also chosen to be the promotional model for the MMORPG Age of Ring (반지). In the same year, she became the official endorser of Hyundai Motors Auto Advantage program.

On February 26, 2018, Irene was selected as the model for the contact lens brand Cooper Vision. In the same month, she became an advertising model of the casual accessory brand Hazzys Accessories. On May 3, she became the brand model for famous vitamin brand LEMONA Vitamin C and was given the title "human vitamin". On August 9, she was announced as the new promotional model for French sports brand Eider for fall/winter of 2018 and spring/summer of 2019. In November 2018, Irene, together with Wendy, also became an endorser of Dongwon Yangban Rice Porridge. In December, she was chosen to be the face for HiteJinro Chamisul soju brand.

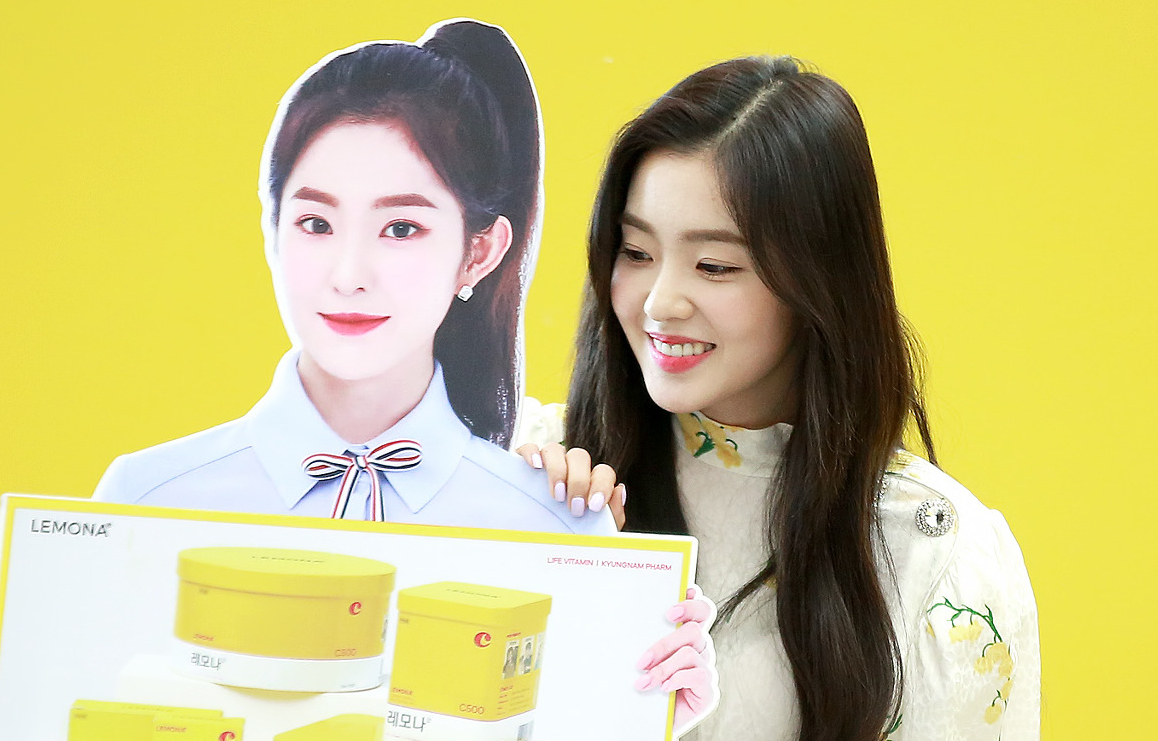
Irene during Lemona promotional fansigning event in 2019

In February 2019, Irene was announced as the new muse of the Italian luxury jewelry brand Damiani, becoming the first Asian to represent the brand as a muse. In March 2019, she attended the Miu Miu AW19 show at Paris Fashion Week.

As her global influence continues to rise, Irene became the new ambassador for mid-range beauty brand Clinique in the Asia Pacific in March 2020. On September 17, 2020, Irene was announced as the new ambassador for Prada.

In 2023, Irene was appointed as an advertising model for the cosmetics brand 2aN. On May 19, 2025, Dong-A Pharmaceutical announced Irene as the new model for its premium inner beauty brand ILO.

=== Philanthropy ===
In February 2020, Irene donated ₩100 million for the Community Chest of Korea to help support those affected by the COVID-19 pandemic in South Korea. In March 2025, Irene donated ₩100 million to aid relief efforts for those affected by the Youngnam forest fires.

== Impact and influence ==
On March 18, 2018, Irene mentioned reading Kim Ji-young, Born 1982, which led to her becoming the target of cyberbullying. On March 21, the mention caused a 104% surge in sales compared to the same period the previous week according to Yes24, with 70,000 copies sold in just one week, and regained #1 spot on Aladdin. Seoul Economic Daily noted on April 12, 2018, that "the book, which has been a bestseller since it was published in 2016, saw the 'Irene effect' with sales soaring by a whopping 462.4%". By May 2018, the book became the most borrowed title at Seoul National University, which houses South Korea's largest university library collection.

In Gallup Korea's Idol Preference poll, Irene was named as one of the top-most loved idol celebrities in South Korea. In 2019, in a separate survey among soldiers doing mandatory military service in South Korea, Irene was ranked as the third most popular female K-pop idol.

Irene's popularity has led to several brand endorsements. She also topped the "Individual Girl Group Members Brand Power Ranking" chart published by the Korean Corporate Reputation Research Institute, placing within the top 3 several times in 2018. In 2023, she took the number one spot in the "Female Idol Star Ranking" for four consecutive weeks.

== Controversy ==
On October 21, 2020, Kang Kook Hwa, a fashion editor, alleged that an unnamed female celebrity mistreated and lashed out at her when she worked as their stylist. The next day, Irene posted an official statement on social media, apologizing for her poor words and actions. SM Entertainment also subsequently released a statement apologizing for causing concern to the public. The controversy sparked conversations about the "gapjil" culture in Korean society, referring to abusive conduct by people in power. Some believed that public outrage towards Irene was related to this issue. The incident also shed light on the higher standard women in idol groups are held to compared to male artists.

Following further speculations, some staffers who had worked with Irene defended her by posting on Instagram that they had never experienced the alleged mistreatment from her. Ellena Yim, a former SM stylist and visual director, opined that the public should consider both sides of the story. The fashion editor involved in the incident also asked the public to refrain from speculating that there was a monetary settlement, emphasizing that there was only a sincere apology.

On January 15, 2021, Irene posted her second public apology through the Lysn fan communication platform, reflecting on her career journey and acknowledging the need to improve her communication methods. She stated that "I realized the weight of words and actions, and I will become a more mature person".

== Discography ==
=== Studio albums ===
List of studio albums, showing selected details, peak chart positions and sales figures
Title	Details	Peak chart positions		Sales
Title	Details	KOR	JPN	Sales
Biggest Fan	Released: March 30, 2026; Label: SM; Formats: CD, digital download, streaming	1	34	KOR: 279,874; JPN: 1,111

=== Extended plays ===
List of extended plays, showing selected details, selected chart positions, sales figures and certifications
Title	Details	Peak chart positions		Sales	Certifications
Title	Details	KOR	JPN	Sales	Certifications
Like a Flower	Released: November 26, 2024; Label: SM; Formats: CD, digital download, streaming	1	29	KOR: 389,992; JPN: 1,985	KMCA: Platinum

=== Singles ===
==== As lead artist ====
Title	Year	Peak chart positions	Album
Title	Year	KOR	Album
"Like a Flower"	2024	109	Like a Flower
"Biggest Fan"	2026	129	Biggest Fan

==== As featured artist ====
Title	Year	Album
"The Only" (Raiden featuring Irene)	2019	Non-album single

==== Soundtrack appearances ====
Title	Year	Album
"A White Night" (흰 밤)	2021	Double Patty (Original Motion Picture Soundtrack)

==== Other charted songs ====
List of other charted songs, showing year released, selected chart positions, and name of the album
Title	Year	Peak chart positions	Album
Title	Year	KOR DL	Album
"Summer Rain"	2024	72	Like a Flower
"Calling Me Back"	2024	90	Like a Flower
"Strawberry Silhouette"	2024	89	Like a Flower
"Start Line"	2024	73	Like a Flower
"Winter Wish"	2024	67	Like a Flower
"Ka-Ching" (Special Track)	2024	76	Like a Flower
"I Feel Pretty" (Special Track)	2024	93	Like a Flower
"Best Believe"	2026	79	Biggest Fan
"Don't Wanna Get Up"	2026	82	Biggest Fan
"Face To Face"	2026	91	Biggest Fan
"Million Miles Away"	2026	89	Biggest Fan
"Love Can Make Away"	2026	75	Biggest Fan
"Spilt It Out"	2026	93	Biggest Fan
"Black Halo"	2026	94	Biggest Fan
"MTV (My Timeless Video)"	2026	90	Biggest Fan
"Wasteland"	2026	92	Biggest Fan

== Videography ==
=== Music videos ===
Title	Year	Director(s)	Ref.
"A White Night" (Soundtrack of Double Patty)	2021	Unknown	
"Like A Flower"	2024	Minjae Kim (Sigakryu)	
"Biggest Fan"	2026	Han Daehee	

=== Music video appearances ===
Year	Title	Artist	Ref.
2013	"1-4-3 (I Love You)"	Henry	
2013	"Why So Serious?"	Shinee	
2014	"At Gwanghwamun"	Kyuhyun	

== Filmography ==
=== Film ===
Year	Title	Role	Notes	Ref.
2015	SMTown: The Stage	Herself	Documentary film for SMTOWN	
2020	Trolls World Tour	Baby Bun (voice)	Animated film	
2021	Double Patty	Lee Hyun-ji		

=== Television series ===
Year	Title	Role	Notes	Ref.
2016	Descendants of the Sun	Herself	Cameo, Episode 16	

=== Web series ===
Year	Title	Role	Ref.
2016	Women at a Game Company	Ah-reum	

=== Television shows ===
Year	Title	Role	Notes	Ref.
2016	Trick & True	Panelist	Episodes 1–4	
2016–2017	Laundry Day	Host	Episodes 1–12	
2024	Immortal Songs	Contestant	With Seulgi (Episode 647 - TVXQ Special)	

=== Web shows ===
Year	Title	Role	Ref.
2022	Irene's Work & Holiday	Host	

=== Hosting ===
Year	Title	Note	Ref.
2015–2016	Music Bank	With Park Bo-gum	
2017	Music Bank World Tour: Singapore	With Park Bo-gum	
2017	Music Bank World Tour: Jakarta	With Park Bo-gum	
2017	Korean Popular Culture and Arts Awards	With Jang Sung-kyu	
2017	KBS Song Festival	Part I; with Jin, Sana, and Chanyeol	
2018	SBS Super Concert in Taipei	With Mingyu	
2019	KBS Song Festival	With Jinyoung	
2024	Inkigayo	Special MC; with Moon Seong-hyun and Han Yu-jin	
2025	Korea Grand Music Awards	Day 1; with Nam Ji-hyun	

== Bibliography ==
=== Solo photobooks ===
Title	Year	Publisher	Ref.
1 Page of Irene	2024	SM Entertainment	

== Concerts and tours ==
=== Headlining ===
- I-Will (2026)

== Awards and nominations ==
Name of the award ceremony, year presented, category, nominee of the award, and the result of the nomination
Award ceremony	Year	Category	Nominee / Work	Result	Ref.
KBS Entertainment Awards	2015	Rookie of the Year (Variety)	Music Bank	Nominated	
MAMA Awards	2025	Fans' Choice Top 10 – Female	Irene	Won	
MAMA Awards	2025	Fans' Choice of the Year	Irene	Nominated	
Supersound Festival	2025	Female Solo Artist	Irene	Won	
Weibo International Entertainment Awards	2026	Popular International Solo Artist of the Year	Irene	Won	
