= Like a Flower =

- Digital cover

EP by Irene
- Released: November 26, 2024
- Studios: Doobdoob (Seoul); Golden Bell Tree Sound (Seoul); SM Aube (Seoul); SM Big Shot (Seoul); SM Dorii (Seoul); SM LVYIN (Seoul); Sound Pool (Seoul)
- Length: 24:10
- Language: Korean
- Labels: SM; Kakao

Irene chronology
Like a Flower (2024)	Biggest Fan (2026)

Singles from Like a Flower
- 1. "Like a Flower" Released: November 26, 2024

Like a Flower is the debut extended play by South Korean singer Irene. It was released by SM Entertainment on November 26, 2024, and contains eight tracks, including the lead single of the same name.

== Background and release ==
On August 8, 2024, SM Entertainment announced in its roadmap that Irene would make her solo debut with an extended play in the fourth quarter of 2024. On November 4, it was announced that Irene would release the extended play titled Like a Flower on November 26. A day later, the promotional schedule was released. The mood teaser videos were released on November 12, November 14, and November 20. On November 21, the hint teaser video was released, followed by the music video spoiler for "Like a Flower" a day later. On November 25, the music video teaser for "Like a Flower" was released. The extended play was released alongside the music video for "Like a Flower" on November 26.

== Composition ==
Like a Flower contains eight tracks. The lead single, "Like a Flower", was described as a pop dance song featuring "bright and cheerful Afro rhythm combined with a soft and dreamy piano rhythm" with lyrics containing the message of "facing life with a little courage like a flower with vitality and making yourself bloom beautifully". The second track, "Summer Rain", was described as a pop ballad song featuring "heavy bass and dreamy synth rhythm" with lyrics "containing the message that if we're together, we'll get through this summer once again, keeping each other warm, even if we're shaken like daisies caught in the summer rain". The third track, "Calling Me Back", was described as a "futuristic" pop, R&B, and dance song characterized by "dreamy synths and piano lines layered over 808 bass and trap beats" with lyrics narrating "the changes and unfamiliar emotions encountered after just waking up to love". The fourth track, "Strawberry Silhouette", was described as a "mid-tempo" R&B and pop dance song with lyrics "telling [the listener] to hide from [Irene] because I will become your sweet silhouette".

The fifth track, "Start Line", was described as a band pop song defined by "dynamic synth bass and rich band sound" lyrics "emphasizing the importance of courage to take a step forward" and having a message that "I can always start anew on the same line with you when you need me". The sixth track, "Winter Wish", was described as a pop dance song with lyrics "that brings out the excitement of winter by depicting the story of enjoying simple yet full happiness in the magic where everything in the world becomes simpler thanks to the sparkle of Christmas and the warmth of white winter". The seventh track, "Ka-Ching", was described as a pop dance song featuring "cheerful bass and synth rhythm" with lyrics "depict[ing] the joy of coloring each day with your own taste and filling your life with the things you want, and the freedom of the bright and playful character provides even more pleasant energy". The last track, "I Feel Pretty", was described as a pop acoustic song with lyrics "contain[ing] a simple wish to find a comfortable and natural self in a complex world and to have that image become my never-ending romance".

== Promotion ==
Prior to the release of Like a Flower, on November 26, 2024, Irene held a live event called "Irene 'Like A Flower' Countdown Live" on YouTube, TikTok and Weverse, aimed at introducing the extended play and connecting with her fanbase.

== Track listing ==
Track listing for Like a Flower
No.	Title	Lyrics	Music	Arrangement	Length
1.	"Like a Flower"	Spoon; Lee Eun-hwa (153/Joombas); Danke	Barney Cox; Joey Eighty; JC. Don; Elena Hoey; Ejae	Barns Noble	3:12
2.	"Summer Rain"	Swedish Laundry; Bong Eun-young (Jamfactory); Kyul	Aaron Theodore Berton; Matthew Crawford; Brooke Tomlinson	Theo & The Climb	3:31
3.	"Calling Me Back"	Kenzie	Kenzie; Mike Daley; Mitchell Owens; Adrian McKinnon	Mike Daley; Mitchell Owens	2:59
4.	"Strawberry Silhouette"	Bong Eun-young (Jamfactory); Yoo Seung-yeon (153/Joombas)	Henrik Moreborg; Rosemarie Tan; Sofia Quinn	Henrik Moreborg	2:57
5.	"Start Line"	Jo Won-sang (Lucy)	Johan Gustafsson; Shintaro Yasuda; Sandra Wikström; Yejune Synn	Johan Gustafsson	2:58
6.	"Winter Wish"	Danke; Bong Eun-young (Jamfactory)	Gingerbread; Alida Garpestad Peck; Jack Newsome; Jake K (Artiffect)	Gingerbread; Jake K (Artiffect)	2:56
7.	"Ka-Ching" (Special track)	Kim In-hyung (Jamfactory)	Anders Kjær; Sivert Hjeltnes Hagtvet; Lise Reppe	Anders Kjær; Sivert Hjeltnes Hagtvet	2:53
8.	"I Feel Pretty" (Special track)	Jo Yoon-kyung; Kim Si-won	Jonah Christian; Eli Brown; Sherie; Lisa Scinta	Jonah Christian; Eli Brown; Sherie	2:44
Total length:					24:10

== Credits and personnel ==
Credits adapted from the EP's liner notes.

Studio

- SM Dorii Studio – recording (track 1), digital editing, engineered for mix (track 3–5)
- SM Aube Studio – recording (track 1, 3–6), digital editing (track 6)
- Doobdoob Studio – recording (track 1–3, 6), digital editing (track 1)
- Sound Pool Studio – recording (track 2, 8), digital editing (track 7–8)
- SM LVYIN Studio – recording (track 3, 7), digital editing, engineered for mix, mixing (track 7)
- SM Big Shot Studio – recording (track 5), mixing (track 4)
- Golden Bell Tree Sound – recording (track 7)
- SM Yellow Tail Studio – engineered for mix (track 1–2, 8)
- KLANG Studio – engineered for mix, mixing (track 6)
- SM Blue Ocean Studio – mixing (track 1)
- SM Starlight Studio – mixing (track 2, 8)
- SM Blue Cup Studio – mixing (track 3)
- SM Concert Hall Studio – mixing (track 5)
- 821 Sound – mastering (all tracks)

Personnel

- SM Entertainment – executive producer
- Irene – vocals (all tracks), background vocals (track 7)
- Spoon – lyrics (track 1)
- Lee Eun-hwa (153/Joombas) – lyrics (track 1)
- Danke – lyrics (track 1, 6)
- Barney Cox a.k.a. Barns Noble – composition, arrangement (track 1)
- Joey Eighty – composition (track 1)
- JC. Don – composition (track 1)
- Elena Hoey – composition, background vocals (track 1)
- Ejae – composition (track 1)
- Swedish Laundry – lyrics (track 2)
- Bong Eun-young (Jamfactory) – lyrics (track 2, 4, 6)
- Kyul – lyrics (track 2)
- Aaron Theodore Berton (Theo & The Climb) – composition, arrangement (track 2)
- Matthew Crawford (Theo & The Climb) – composition, arrangement (track 2)
- Brooke Tomlinson – composition, background vocals (track 2)
- Kenzie – lyrics, composition (track 3), vocal directing (track 1, 3)
- Mike Daley – composition, arrangement (track 3)
- Mitchell Owens – composition, arrangement (track 3)
- Adrian McKinnon – composition (track 3)
- Yoo Seung-yeon (153/Joombas) – lyrics (track 4)
- Henrik Moreborg – composition, arrangement (track 4)
- Rosemarie Tan – composition (track 4)
- Sofia Quinn – composition (track 4)
- Jo Won-sang (Lucy) – lyrics (track 5)
- Johan Gustafsson – composition, arrangement (track 5)
- Shintaro Yasuda – composition (track 5)
- Sandra Wikstrom – composition (track 5)
- Yejune Synn – composition (track 5)
- Gingerbread – composition, arrangement (track 6)
- Alida Garpestad Peck – composition, background vocals (track 6)
- Jack Newsome – composition (track 6)
- Jake K (Artiffect) – composition, arrangement (track 6)
- Kim In-hyung (Jamfactory) – lyrics (track 7)
- Anders Kjær – composition, arrangement (track 7)
- Sivert Hjeltnes Hagtvet – composition, arrangement (track 7)
- Lise Reppe – composition (track 7)
- Jo Yoon-kyung – lyrics (track 8)
- Kim Si-won – lyrics (track 8)
- Jonah Christian – composition, arrangement (track 8)
- Eli Brown – composition, arrangement (track 8)
- Sherie – composition, arrangement (track 8)
- Lisa Scinta – composition (track 8)
- Choo Dae-kwan a.k.a. DK Choo – vocal directing (track 2)
- Joo Kang-hyun – vocal directing (track 2)
- Kyung Da-som – vocal directing (track 4)
- MinGtion – vocal directing (track 5, 7–8)
- Kim Soo-bin – vocal directing (track 6)
- Kim Jin-hwan – vocal directing (track 7–8)
- Ikki – background vocals (track 1–2, 6)
- Emily Yeonseo Kim – background vocals (track 3)
- Yoo Sung-eun – background vocals (track 4–5)
- Une – background vocals (track 8)
- Jeong Jae-won – recording (track 1), digital editing, engineered for mix (track 3–5)
- Kim Hyo-joon – recording (track 1, 3–6), digital editing (track 6)
- Kim Ji-hyun – recording (track 1–2, 6)
- Eugene Kwon – recording (track 2), digital editing (track 1)
- Jang Woo-young – recording (track 3)
- Jeong Ho-jin – recording (track 2), digital editing (track 7–8)
- On Seong-yoon – recording (track 8)
- Lee Ji-hong – recording (track 3, 7), digital editing, engineered for mix, mixing (track 7)
- Lee Min-kyu – recording (track 5), mixing (track 4)
- Kim Ye-ji – recording (track 7)
- Yang Ha-jeong – digital editing (track 2, 6)
- Noh Min-ji – engineered for mix (track 1–2, 8)
- Hong Jang-mi – engineered for mix (track 6)
- Kim Cheol-sun – mixing (track 1)
- Jeong Yoo-ra – mixing (track 2, 8)
- Jung Eui-seok – mixing (track 3)
- Nam Koong-jin – mixing (track 5)
- Koo Jong-pil – mixing (track 6)
- Kwon Nam-woo – mastering (all tracks)

== Charts ==
=== Weekly charts ===
Weekly chart performance for Like a Flower
Chart (2024)	Peak position
Japanese Albums (Oricon)	29
Japanese Hot Albums (Billboard Japan)	23
South Korean Albums (Circle)	1

=== Monthly charts ===
Monthly chart performance for Like a Flower
Chart (2024)	Position
South Korean Albums (Circle)	7

=== Year-end charts ===
Year-end chart performance for Like a Flower
Chart (2024)	Position
South Korean Albums (Circle)	82

== Certifications ==
Certifications for Like a Flower
Region	Certification	Certified units/sales
South Korea (KMCA)	Platinum	250,000^{^}
^{^} Shipments figures based on certification alone.

== Release history ==
Release history for Like a Flower
Region	Date	Format	Label
South Korea	November 26, 2024	CD	SM; Kakao
Various	November 26, 2024	Digital download; streaming	SM; Kakao
