= Like a Flower (song) =

Single by Irene

from the EP Like a Flower
- Language: Korean
- Released: November 26, 2024
- Genre: Dance-pop
- Length: 3:12
- Label: SM; Kakao
- Composers: Barney Cox; Joey Eighty; JC. Don; Elena Hoey; Ejae
- Lyricists: Spoon; Lee Eun-hwa (153/Joombas); Danke

Irene singles chronology
"Like a Flower" (2024)	"Biggest Fan" (2026)

Music video
- "Like a Flower" on YouTube

"Like a Flower" is a song recorded by South Korean singer Irene for her debut extended play of the same name. It was released as the EP's lead single by SM Entertainment on November 26, 2024.

== Background and release ==
On August 8, 2024, SM Entertainment announced in its roadmap that Irene would make her solo debut with an extended play in the fourth quarter of 2024. On November 4, it was announced that Irene would release the extended play titled Like a Flower on November 26. On November 22, the music video spoiler was released, followed by the music video teaser on November 25. The song was released alongside the extended play and its music video on November 26.

== Composition ==
"Like a Flower", was described as a pop dance song featuring "bright and cheerful Afrobeats rhythm combined with a soft and dreamy piano rhythm" with lyrics containing the message of "facing life with a little courage like a flower with vitality and making yourself bloom beautifully".

== Promotion ==
Prior to the release of Like a Flower, on November 26, 2024, Irene held a live event called "Irene 'Like A Flower' Countdown Live" on YouTube, TikTok and Weverse, aimed at introducing the extended play and its songs, including "Like a Flower", and connecting with her fanbase. She subsequent performed the song on three music programs: KBS's Music Bank on November 29, MBC's Show! Music Core on November 30, and SBS's Inkigayo on December 1.

== Credits and personnel ==
Credits adapted from the EP's liner notes.

Studio

- SM Dorii Studio – recording
- SM Aube Studio – recording
- Doobdoob Studio – recording, digital editing
- SM Yellow Tail Studio – engineered for mix
- SM Blue Ocean Studio – mixing
- 821 Sound – mastering

Personnel

- SM Entertainment – executive producer
- Irene – vocals
- Spoon – lyrics
- Lee Eun-hwa (153/Joombas) – lyrics
- Danke – lyrics
- Barney Cox a.k.a. Barns Noble – composition, arrangement
- Joey Eighty – composition
- JC. Don – composition
- Elena Hoey – composition, background vocals
- Ejae – composition
- Kenzie – vocal directing
- Ikki – background vocals
- Jeong Jae-won – recording
- Kim Hyo-joon – recording
- Kim Ji-hyun – recording
- Eugene Kwon – digital editing
- Noh Min-ji – engineered for mix
- Kim Cheol-sun – mixing
- Kwon Nam-woo – mastering

== Charts ==
Chart performance for "Like a Flower"
Chart (2024)	Peak position
South Korea (Circle)	109

== Release history ==
Release history for "Like a Flower"
Region	Date	Format	Label
Various	November 26, 2024	Digital download; streaming	SM; Kakao
