= Yaeger (singer) =

Swedish singer-songwriter Yaeger

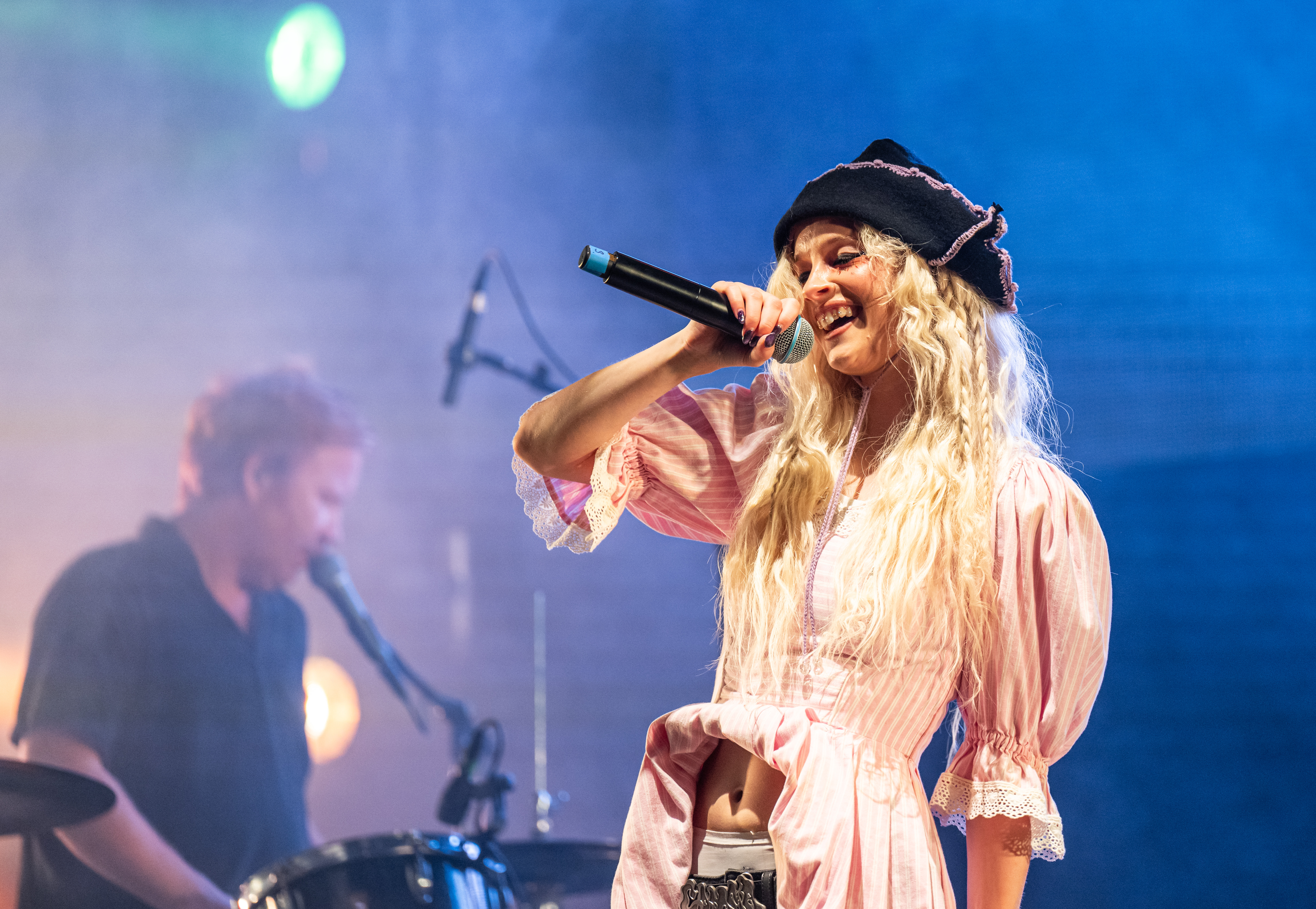
- Yaeger performing at the Feelings Festival on August 2024 in Bergen, Norway
- Born: Hanna Gillian Kristina Jäger; 22 February 1998; Stockholm, Sweden
- Education: Rytmus musikgymnasium
- Occupation: Singer - Songwriter
- Years active: 2017 - Present
- Website: yaeger.se

Hanna Gillian Kristina Jäger (born February 22, 1998), known professionally as Yaeger, is a Swedish singer and songwriter. Based in Stockholm, Sweden, her style of popular music is described as emotional rave pop (ERP) while according to ELLE Sweden - who judged her Best Dressed Woman 2024 - her "sense of style, courage and creativity form an expression that leaves an impression - both visually and musically."

== Early life ==
Yaeger was raised on Skarpö in the Stockholm archipelago and attended Rytmus Musikergymnasium, a Stockholm music school.

== Career ==
=== 2017–2020 ===
In August 2017, as an independent artist she released her first single "Ocean", described as "a slick, subtle pop song that stood out for its minimal, effortless swagger and breezy confidence." This was followed by "Dopamine High" (2018) and "You Like Me" (2019) that were included on her debut EP "Gul" (2019).

A second EP "Fixed-Gear" was released in late-2019, which began a collaboration with producer Oscar Scheller who also performed on her 2020 single "Nosebleed". Belgian DJ/producer Yves V performing with AFROJACK and Icona Pop released "We Got That Cool" written by Hanna Jäger that reached #4 on the US Billboard's Dance/Mix Show Airplay chart and featured in the FIFA 21 video game soundtrack.

=== 2021–2022 ===
In 2021, Yaeger briefly lived in London, signing with publishing house Kobalt Music UK, and teamed up with Australian DJ/producer Hayden James on "Waiting For Nothing (feat. Yaeger)" where she was credited as a co-writer and performer. The song featured on James' album "Lifted" and finished #90 in the Triple J Hottest 100 2021.

The single "Can't Get The Best Of Me" featured on Billboard's "Cool New Pop Songs 9/26" compilation, then after moving back to Stockholm in 2022, Yaeger signed with Sony Music Sweden.

=== 2023–2024 ===
A series of sessions with Swedish music producer Sebastian Furrer resulted in a number of singles and culminated in the EP "Jaguar" (2023) including songs such as "Water Pistol", "Lupins In Blue", "Ciao", "Stolen" and "Jaguar".

Yaeger performed at one of Sweden's most prestigious awards, the Swedish Music Publishers' Awards (Musikförläggarnas Pris) and received the Music Publishers' scholarship. She was also nominated by Sweden radio broadcaster P3 for the Guld "Artist of the Future" award, performed a cover of Robyn's "Show Me Love" at the Denniz Pop Awards, performed live with an interview on Swedish TV4's "Nyetsmorgon", performed a cover of Swedish DJ/producer Aviici's "Silhouettes" at "Together For A Better Day" charity event at Aviici Arena, collaborated with Icona Pop on their album "Club Romantech" with the song "Shit We Do For Love", and played at a series of venues and festivals across the Nordic region.

=== 2024–present ===
2024 saw Yaeger continue performing including Stockholm's Rosendhal Garden Party along with Raye and Massive Attack, support Swedish artist Zara Larsson on her European/UK "Venus" tour, receive two nominations at the Grammis (Swedish Grammy Awards) for Alternative Pop of the Year and Composer of the Year, perform at the Brilliant Minds event in Stockholm, be named Sweden's Best Dressed Woman of the Year at the ELLE Gala, be awarded the Swedish Music Publishers' Awards (Musikförläggarnas Pris) Breakthrough Artist of the Year, and release a series of remixes of songs from her "Jaguar" EP.

To celebrate the 10th anniversary of the 2014 international hit by Swedish artist Tove Lo, Yaeger recorded a cover version of "Habits (Stay High)" produced by Sebastian Furrer that was promoted by Spotify as a feature single.
