= Rence (singer-songwriter) =

American singer-songwriter and producer

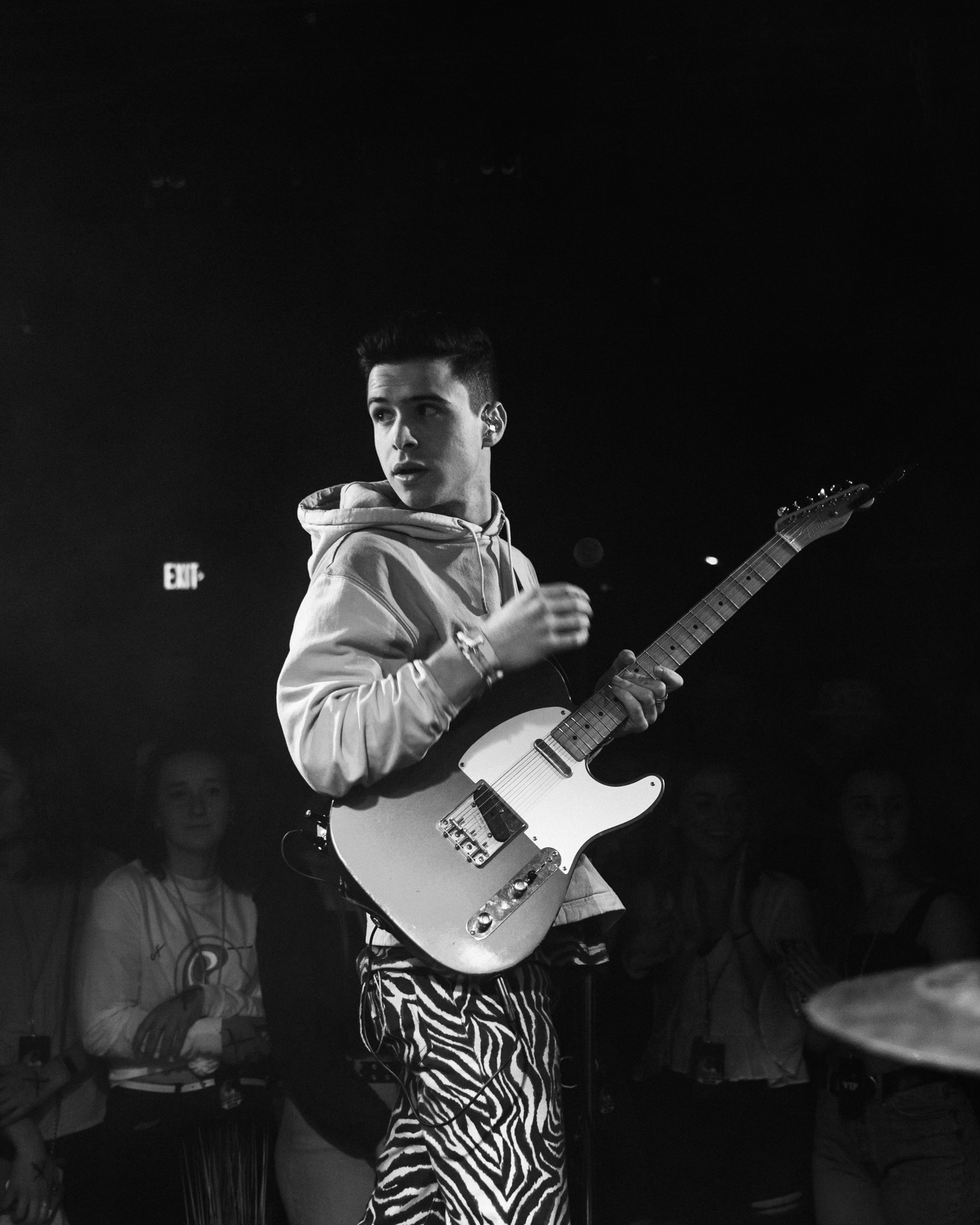
- Singer-songwriter Rence performs in concert

Background information
- Born: Jackson Lawrence Hirsh; February 1, 1998 (age 28); Washington, D.C., U.S.
- Origin: Seattle, Washington
- Genres: Pop
- Occupations: Singer, songwriter, producer
- Label: Epic Records
- Website: yourstrulyrence.com

Rence (born Jackson Lawrence Hirsh, February 1, 1998) is an American singer, songwriter and producer based in Los Angeles. Known for his dynamic take on pop music, Rence spent many years cultivating an independent music career before signing to Epic Records in 2019. His breakout single “Baby Blue” garnered 4 million streams in 2018 and has and has since amassed more than 38 million streams as of August 2024.

== Career ==
As an independent artist, Rence garnered nearly 7 million streams and scored acclaim from Zane Lowe on Apple Music 1 with his single "Ways to Go". Rence studied at New York University's Tisch School of Arts, graduating in 2019 with a Performance Studies major and Business of Entertainment, Media, and Technology minor.

In 2019, he collaborated with Noah Cyrus on “Expensive”, the song that marked his official debut with Epic. Within months, the single reached over 3 million streams and catapulted the artist into new territory with notice by Nylon, Billboard, and Paper. Notably, Rence was featured by Complex magazine's music discovery site, Pigeons and Planes, in their Best New Artists series. Rence performed at Lollapalooza in August 2021 and released his single “Awooo”. In October 2021, Rence released the single "Track Shoes", which has just under 2.9 million streams as of August 2024. In 2023, he released his latest single, "Trebuchet", and in 2024, he released SINK OR SWIM, a collection of two songs: "Best Intentions" and "GO!".

Various music writers have described Rence as a genre disruptor because of the breakout star’s ability to transcend genre in his songs. Beyond his solo music, Rence has also collaborated with, produced, and written for a wide range of musicians in genres from pop and K-pop to country, including Johnny Orlando, Benjamin Kheng, BLACKSWAN, JAEHYUN of NCT, Lay (formerly in Exo-M), Lillian Hepler, Alex Porat, and Rye LaChance.

== Discography ==
=== Singles ===
- "Rock with Me" (2017)
- "Too Many Times" (2017)
- "4321" (2017)
- "Close Friends" (2019)
- "Baby Blue" (2019)
- "Space For You" (2019)
- "Ways To Go" (2019)
- "Expensive" (with Noah Cyrus) (2019)
- "Darkside" (2019)
- "I know" (2019)
- "Darkside" (with marcos g) (2019)
- "I know" (with Riz La Vie) (2019)
- "hate u btw" (2020)
- "i need a vacation" (with Johan Lenox) (2020)
- "Type 2" (2020)
- "Tears In December" (2020)
- "Type 2" (with Chloe Lilac) (2020)
- "happy for you" (with Alex Porat) (2020)
- "Sometimes Things Just Fall Apart" (2020)
- "Strawberry Blonde" (2020)
- "Help" (with Sarah Barrios) (2020)
- "Endless" (2021)
- "AWOOO!" (2021)
- "Track Shoes" (2021)
- "TREBUCHET" (2023)

=== EPs ===
- Nineteen (2017)
- Pink (2018)
- Fall 2019 (2019)
- SINK OR SWIM (2024)

=== Production/Writing Credits ===
Rence is usually credited for songwriting as his birth name, Jackson Hirsh.

- Johnny Orlando - "blur" (2022)
- Max Drazen - "Love and War" (2023)
- Lillian Hepler - "Call Me Yours" (2023)
- Alex Porat - "Kiss Face" (2023)
- Max Drazen - Someday (2023)
- Benjamin Kheng - Gloomy Boogie (2023)
- hollo - "Hometown" (2024)
- Michael Gerow - "get what u want" (2024)
- Rye LaChance - "Widows of Normandy" (2024)
- TEHYA - "crowd pleaser" (2024)
- BLACKSWAN - "Roll Up" (2024)
- JAEHYUN - "Dandelion"
- Lay - "Breathe" (2024)

== Management ==
Rence is managed by Andrew Keller
