= Biggest Fan (Irene song) =

Single by Irene

from the album Biggest Fan
- Language: Korean
- Released: March 30, 2026
- Genre: Pop dance
- Length: 2:48
- Label: SM; Kakao
- Composers: Evan Gartner; Grace Baer; Samuel Preston
- Lyricist: Liljune

Irene singles chronology
"Like a Flower" (2024)	"Biggest Fan" (2026)

Music video
- "Biggest Fan" on YouTube

"Biggest Fan" is a song recorded by South Korean singer Irene for her first studio album of the same name. It was released as the album's lead single by SM Entertainment on March 30, 2026.

== Background and release ==
On February 27, 2026, SM Entertainment announced that Irene would be releasing her first studio album in March 2026. On March 8, it was announced that Biggest Fan would be released on March 30. It will contain ten tracks, including the lead single of the same name. On March 27, the music video teaser was released. The song was released alongside its music video and the album on March 30.

== Composition ==
"Biggest Fan" was written by Liljune, composed and arranged by Evan Gartner with Grace Baer and Samuel Preston contributing to the composition. It is a pop dance song characterized by an "upbeat groove bass" with lyrics "delivering the message of becoming each other's fans and cheering for one another with a cheerful and confident attitude".

== Commercial performance ==
"Biggest Fan" debuted at number 129 on South Korean's Circle Digital Chart in the date issue dated March 29–April 4, 2026; on its component charts, the song debuted at number three on the Circle Download Chart, and number 179 on the Circle BGM Chart.

== Promotion ==
Irene performed the song on four music programs in the first week: Mnet's M Countdown on April 2, KBS's Music Bank on April 3, MBC's Show! Music Core on April 4, and SBS's Inkigayo on April 5. In the second week, she performed the song on four music programs: Mnet's M Countdown on April 9, KBS's Music Bank on April 10 where she won first place, MBC's Show! Music Core on April 11, and SBS's Inkigayo on April 12.

== Accolades ==
Music program awards for "Biggest Fan"
Program	Date	Ref.
Music Bank	April 10, 2026	

== Credits and personnel ==
Credits adapted from the album's liner notes.

Studio

- SM Aube Studio – recording, digital editing
- SM Wavelet Studio – recording
- SM Blue Ocean Studio – mixing
- 821 Sound – mastering

Personnel

- SM Entertainment – executive producer
- Irene – vocals, background vocals
- Liljune – lyrics
- Evan Gartner – composition, arrangement
- Grace Baer – composition, background vocals
- Samuel Preston – composition
- Kenzie – vocal directing
- Kim Hyo-joon – recording, digital editing
- Kang Eun-ji – recording
- Kim Cheol-sun – mixing
- Kwon Nam-woo – mastering

== Charts ==
Chart performance for "Biggest Fan"
Chart (2026)	Peak position
South Korea (Circle)	129

== Release history ==
Release history for "Biggest Fan"
Region	Date	Format	Label
Various	March 30, 2026	Digital download; streaming	SM; Kakao
